= 1999 Dutch TT =

(Netherlands) 1999 Dutch Grand Prix
Race details
- Race 7 of 16 races in the 1999 Grand Prix motorcycle racing season
- Date: 26 June 1999
- Official name: Rizla Dutch TT
- Location: TT Circuit Assen
- Course: Permanent racing facility; 6.049 km (3.759 mi)

500cc
Pole position
- Rider: (Japan) Tadayuki Okada
- Time: 2:01.564
Fastest lap
- Rider: (Japan) Tadayuki Okada
- Time: 2:02.471 on lap 9
Podium
- First: (Japan) Tadayuki Okada
- Second: (United States) Kenny Roberts Jr.
- Third: (Spain) Sete Gibernau

250cc
Pole position
- Rider: (Italy) Valentino Rossi
- Time: 2:05.018
Fastest lap
- Rider: (Italy) Valentino Rossi
- Time: 2:05.696 on lap 11
Podium
- First: (Italy) Loris Capirossi
- Second: (Italy) Valentino Rossi
- Third: (United Kingdom) Jeremy McWilliams

125cc
Pole position
- Rider: (Italy) Lucio Cecchinello
- Time: 2:12.853
Fastest lap
- Rider: (Japan) Noboru Ueda
- Time: 2:13.225 on lap 7
Podium
- First: (Japan) Masao Azuma
- Second: (Japan) Noboru Ueda
- Third: (Italy) Roberto Locatelli

The 1999 Dutch TT was the seventh round of the 1999 Grand Prix motorcycle racing season. It took place on 26 June 1999 at the TT Circuit Assen located in Assen, Netherlands.

== 500 cc classification ==
Pos.	No.	Rider	Team	Manufacturer	Laps	Time/Retired	Grid	Points
1	8	(Japan) Tadayuki Okada	Repsol Honda Team	Honda	20	41:12.732	1	25
2	10	(United States) Kenny Roberts Jr.	Suzuki Grand Prix Team	Suzuki	20	+7.316	3	20
3	15	(Spain) Sete Gibernau	Repsol Honda Team	Honda	20	+7.404	6	16
4	9	(Japan) Nobuatsu Aoki	Suzuki Grand Prix Team	Suzuki	20	+10.941	10	13
5	2	(Italy) Max Biaggi	Marlboro Yamaha Team	Yamaha	20	+10.980	5	11
6	6	(Japan) Norick Abe	Antena 3 Yamaha d'Antin	Yamaha	20	+16.271	8	10
7	19	(United States) John Kocinski	Kanemoto Honda	Honda	20	+17.348	2	9
8	14	(Spain) Juan Borja	Movistar Honda Pons	Honda	20	+25.950	11	8
9	26	(Japan) Haruchika Aoki	FCC TSR	TSR-Honda	20	+26.114	18	7
10	5	(Brazil) Alex Barros	Movistar Honda Pons	Honda	20	+31.131	7	6
11	31	(Japan) Tetsuya Harada	Aprilia Grand Prix Racing	Aprilia	20	+36.038	12	5
12	55	(France) Régis Laconi	Red Bull Yamaha WCM	Yamaha	20	+41.016	14	4
13	17	(Netherlands) Jurgen van den Goorbergh	Team Biland GP1	MuZ Weber	20	+41.097	13	3
14	22	(France) Sébastien Gimbert	Tecmas Honda Elf	Honda	20	+1:04.683	19	2
15	24	(Australia) Garry McCoy	Red Bull Yamaha WCM	Yamaha	20	+1:10.481	20	1
16	25	(Spain) José Luis Cardoso	Team Maxon TSR	TSR-Honda	20	+1:20.996	17	
17	68	(Australia) Mark Willis	Proton KR Modenas	Modenas KR3	20	+2:00.973	21	
Ret	18	(Germany) Markus Ober	Dee Cee Jeans Racing Team	Honda	10	Accident	22	
Ret	23	(United Kingdom) Michael Rutter	Millar Honda	Honda	8	Retirement	23	
Ret	3	(Spain) Àlex Crivillé	Repsol Honda Team	Honda	4	Accident	4	
Ret	4	(Spain) Carlos Checa	Marlboro Yamaha Team	Yamaha	4	Retirement	9	
Ret	69	(United Kingdom) James Whitham	Proton KR Modenas	Modenas KR3	3	Retirement	15	
Ret	7	(Italy) Luca Cadalora	Team Biland GP1	MuZ Weber	0	Retirement	16	

== 250 cc classification ==
Pos.	No.	Rider	Manufacturer	Laps	Time/Retired	Grid	Points
1	1	(Italy) Loris Capirossi	Honda	18	38:04.730	4	25
2	46	(Italy) Valentino Rossi	Aprilia	18	+0.180	1	20
3	9	(United Kingdom) Jeremy McWilliams	Aprilia	18	+0.534	2	16
4	4	(Japan) Tohru Ukawa	Honda	18	+0.537	9	13
5	56	(Japan) Shinya Nakano	Yamaha	18	+0.742	6	11
6	6	(Germany) Ralf Waldmann	Aprilia	18	+7.019	3	10
7	21	(Italy) Franco Battaini	Aprilia	18	+20.889	8	9
8	7	(Italy) Stefano Perugini	Honda	18	+20.891	7	8
9	24	(United Kingdom) Jason Vincent	Honda	18	+21.310	10	7
10	14	(Australia) Anthony West	TSR-Honda	18	+26.816	16	6
11	66	(Germany) Alex Hofmann	TSR-Honda	18	+26.933	11	5
12	12	(Argentina) Sebastián Porto	Yamaha	18	+27.054	12	4
13	11	(Japan) Tomomi Manako	Yamaha	18	+27.903	13	3
14	36	(Japan) Masaki Tokudome	TSR-Honda	18	+33.161	14	2
15	41	(Netherlands) Jarno Janssen	TSR-Honda	18	+56.248	15	1
16	37	(Italy) Luca Boscoscuro	TSR-Honda	18	+56.432	19	
17	16	(Sweden) Johan Stigefelt	Yamaha	18	+1:07.433	20	
18	23	(France) Julien Allemand	TSR-Honda	18	+1:16.347	18	
19	10	(Spain) Fonsi Nieto	Yamaha	18	+1:25.622	24	
20	22	(Spain) Lucas Oliver	Yamaha	18	+1:25.758	25	
21	15	(Spain) David García	Yamaha	18	+1:33.867	23	
22	72	(Netherlands) Rudie Markink	Aprilia	18	+1:40.280	26	
23	73	(Netherlands) Arno Visscher	Aprilia	18	+1:40.635	22	
24	75	(Netherlands) Henk van de Lagemaat	Honda	17	+1 lap	28	
Ret	74	(Netherlands) Andre Romein	Honda	8	Retirement	27	
Ret	34	(Italy) Marcellino Lucchi	Aprilia	3	Retirement	5	
Ret	17	(Netherlands) Maurice Bolwerk	TSR-Honda	0	Retirement	21	
Ret	44	(Italy) Roberto Rolfo	Aprilia	0	Retirement	17	
DNS	49	(Japan) Naoki Matsudo	Yamaha		Did not start		
DNS	58	(Argentina) Matías Ríos	Aprilia		Did not start		
DNQ	76	(Netherlands) Johan ten Napel	Honda		Did not qualify		

== 125 cc classification ==
Pos.	No.	Rider	Manufacturer	Laps	Time/Retired	Grid	Points
1	4	(Japan) Masao Azuma	Honda	17	38:09.395	2	25
2	6	(Japan) Noboru Ueda	Honda	17	+0.317	5	20
3	15	(Italy) Roberto Locatelli	Aprilia	17	+0.343	7	16
4	7	(Spain) Emilio Alzamora	Honda	17	+8.842	11	13
5	8	(Italy) Gianluigi Scalvini	Aprilia	17	+9.204	4	11
6	41	(Japan) Youichi Ui	Derbi	17	+9.540	13	10
7	21	(France) Arnaud Vincent	Aprilia	17	+9.741	6	9
8	13	(Italy) Marco Melandri	Honda	17	+9.748	3	8
9	23	(Italy) Gino Borsoi	Aprilia	17	+10.095	8	7
10	1	(Japan) Kazuto Sakata	Honda	17	+11.838	9	6
11	26	(Italy) Ivan Goi	Honda	17	+25.683	19	5
12	32	(Italy) Mirko Giansanti	Aprilia	17	+25.881	15	4
13	54	(San Marino) Manuel Poggiali	Aprilia	17	+37.303	21	3
14	16	(Italy) Simone Sanna	Honda	17	+37.526	12	2
15	9	(France) Frédéric Petit	Aprilia	17	+37.868	14	1
16	22	(Spain) Pablo Nieto	Derbi	17	+39.035	18	
17	10	(Spain) Jerónimo Vidal	Aprilia	17	+40.285	16	
18	71	(Netherlands) Patrick Lakerveld	Honda	17	+2:13.886	25	
19	68	(Netherlands) Hans Koopman	Honda	16	+1 lap	23	
20	69	(Netherlands) Ronnie Timmer	Honda	16	+1 lap	26	
Ret	20	(Germany) Bernhard Absmeier	Aprilia	14	Accident	20	
Ret	70	(Netherlands) Harold de Haan	Honda	14	Retirement	24	
Ret	5	(Italy) Lucio Cecchinello	Honda	13	Accident	1	
Ret	18	(Germany) Reinhard Stolz	Honda	9	Retirement	22	
Ret	12	(France) Randy de Puniet	Aprilia	8	Accident	10	
Ret	44	(Italy) Alessandro Brannetti	Aprilia	6	Retirement	17	
DNS	29	(Spain) Ángel Nieto, Jr.	Honda		Did not start		
DNQ	67	(Netherlands) Wilhelm van Leeuwen	Honda		Did not qualify		

== Championship standings after the race (500cc) ==
Below are the standings for the top five riders and constructors after round seven has concluded.

Riders' Championship standings

Pos.	Rider	Points
1	(Spain) Àlex Crivillé	129
2	(United States) Kenny Roberts Jr.	94
3	(Japan) Tadayuki Okada	93
4	(Spain) Sete Gibernau	88
5	(Spain) Carlos Checa	65

Constructors' Championship standings

Pos.	Constructor	Points
1	(Japan) Honda	161
2	(Japan) Yamaha	107
3	(Japan) Suzuki	94
4	(Italy) Aprilia	50
5	(Germany) MuZ Weber	28

- Note: Only the top five positions are included for both sets of standings.

Previous race: 1999 Catalan Grand Prix	FIM Grand Prix World Championship; 1999 season	Next race: 1999 British Grand Prix
Previous race: 1998 Dutch TT	Dutch TT	Next race: 2000 Dutch TT
