= 1999 German motorcycle Grand Prix =

(Germany) 1999 German Grand Prix
Race details
- Race 9 of 16 races in the 1999 Grand Prix motorcycle racing season
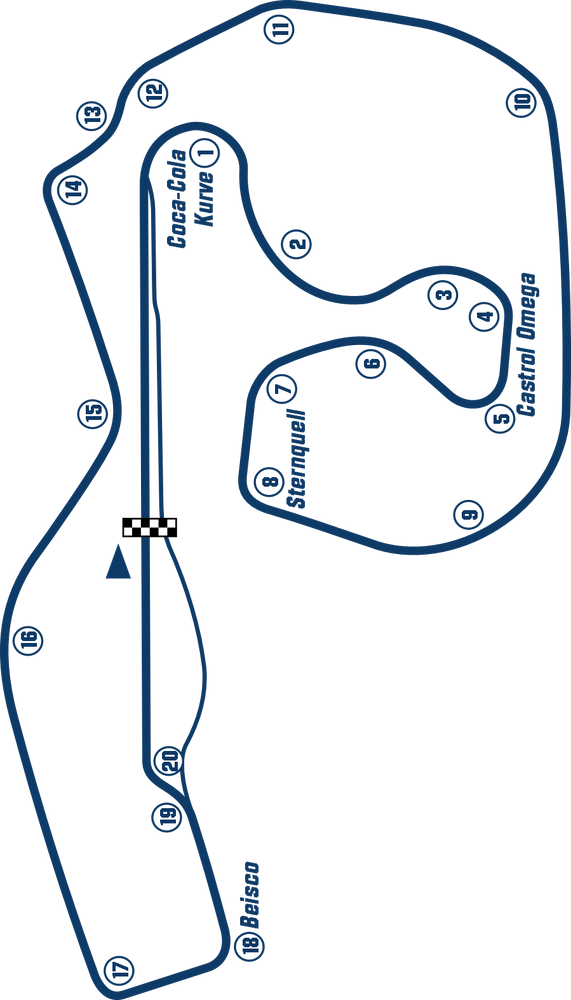
- Date: 18 July 1999
- Official name: Polini Motorrad Grand Prix Deutschland
- Location: Sachsenring
- Course: Permanent racing facility; 3.508 km (2.180 mi)

500cc
Pole position
- Rider: (United States) Kenny Roberts Jr.
- Time: 1:27.318
Fastest lap
- Rider: (Brazil) Alex Barros
- Time: 1:28.072 on lap 6
Podium
- First: (United States) Kenny Roberts Jr.
- Second: (Spain) Àlex Crivillé
- Third: (Japan) Norick Abe

250cc
Pole position
- Rider: (Italy) Valentino Rossi
- Time: 1:27.913
Fastest lap
- Rider: (Italy) Loris Capirossi
- Time: 1:28.662 on lap 2
Podium
- First: (Italy) Valentino Rossi
- Second: (Italy) Loris Capirossi
- Third: (Germany) Ralf Waldmann

125cc
Pole position
- Rider: (Italy) Marco Melandri
- Time: 1:30.280
Fastest lap
- Rider: (Spain) Emilio Alzamora
- Time: 1:30.159 on lap 4
Podium
- First: (Italy) Marco Melandri
- Second: (Spain) Emilio Alzamora
- Third: (Italy) Lucio Cecchinello

The 1999 German motorcycle Grand Prix was the ninth round of the 1999 Grand Prix motorcycle racing season. It took place on 18 July 1999 at the Sachsenring.

== 500 cc classification ==
Pos.	No.	Rider	Team	Manufacturer	Laps	Time/Retired	Grid	Points
1	10	(United States) Kenny Roberts Jr.	Suzuki Grand Prix Team	Suzuki	31	45:59.732	1	25
2	3	(Spain) Àlex Crivillé	Repsol Honda Team	Honda	31	+0.338	10	20
3	6	(Japan) Norick Abe	Antena 3 Yamaha d'Antin	Yamaha	31	+5.669	8	16
4	4	(Spain) Carlos Checa	Marlboro Yamaha Team	Yamaha	31	+5.737	4	13
5	19	(United States) John Kocinski	Kanemoto Honda	Honda	31	+20.316	5	11
6	26	(Japan) Haruchika Aoki	FCC TSR	TSR-Honda	31	+27.848	9	10
7	31	(Japan) Tetsuya Harada	Aprilia Grand Prix Racing	Aprilia	31	+31.016	7	9
8	5	(Brazil) Alex Barros	Movistar Honda Pons	Honda	31	+35.425	2	8
9	15	(Spain) Sete Gibernau	Repsol Honda Team	Honda	31	+35.909	14	7
10	14	(Spain) Juan Borja	Movistar Honda Pons	Honda	31	+37.124	18	6
11	24	(Australia) Garry McCoy	Red Bull Yamaha WCM	Yamaha	31	+42.252	16	5
12	17	(Netherlands) Jurgen van den Goorbergh	Team Biland GP1	MuZ Weber	31	+44.278	13	4
13	55	(France) Régis Laconi	Red Bull Yamaha WCM	Yamaha	31	+45.020	12	3
14	22	(France) Sébastien Gimbert	Tecmas Honda Elf	Honda	31	+46.454	19	2
15	52	(Spain) José David de Gea	Team Maxon TSR	TSR-Honda	31	+1:05.990	20	1
16	68	(Australia) Mark Willis	Buckley Systems BSL Racing	Modenas KR3	31	+1:06.346	21	
17	18	(Germany) Markus Ober	Dee Cee Jeans Racing Team	Honda	31	+1:28.717	22	
Ret	8	(Japan) Tadayuki Okada	Repsol Honda Team	Honda	14	Accident	11	
Ret	69	(United Kingdom) James Whitham	Proton KR Modenas	Modenas KR3	9	Accident	17	
Ret	21	(United Kingdom) Michael Rutter	Millar Honda	Honda	4	Retirement	23	
Ret	9	(Japan) Nobuatsu Aoki	Suzuki Grand Prix Team	Suzuki	3	Accident	15	
Ret	7	(Italy) Luca Cadalora	Team Biland GP1	MuZ Weber	1	Accident	3	
Ret	2	(Italy) Max Biaggi	Marlboro Yamaha Team	Yamaha	1	Accident	6	

== 250 cc classification ==
Pos.	No.	Rider	Manufacturer	Laps	Time/Retired	Grid	Points
1	46	(Italy) Valentino Rossi	Aprilia	30	44:49.622	1	25
2	1	(Italy) Loris Capirossi	Honda	30	+0.148	3	20
3	6	(Germany) Ralf Waldmann	Aprilia	30	+9.030	6	16
4	56	(Japan) Shinya Nakano	Yamaha	30	+12.295	4	13
5	7	(Italy) Stefano Perugini	Honda	30	+18.391	10	11
6	14	(Australia) Anthony West	TSR-Honda	30	+18.553	16	10
7	12	(Argentina) Sebastián Porto	Yamaha	30	+19.201	11	9
8	19	(France) Olivier Jacque	Yamaha	30	+19.637	9	8
9	66	(Germany) Alex Hofmann	TSR-Honda	30	+22.149	12	7
10	37	(Italy) Luca Boscoscuro	TSR-Honda	30	+35.995	14	6
11	23	(France) Julien Allemand	TSR-Honda	30	+44.097	15	5
12	44	(Italy) Roberto Rolfo	Aprilia	30	+45.011	19	4
13	34	(Italy) Marcellino Lucchi	Aprilia	30	+45.254	8	3
14	11	(Japan) Tomomi Manako	Yamaha	30	+47.452	13	2
15	36	(Japan) Masaki Tokudome	TSR-Honda	30	+47.559	22	1
16	17	(Netherlands) Maurice Bolwerk	TSR-Honda	30	+1:25.355	21	
17	81	(Germany) Mike Baldinger	TSR-Honda	30	+1:25.473	20	
18	10	(Spain) Fonsi Nieto	Yamaha	29	+1 lap	26	
19	85	(Germany) Matthias Neukirchen	Aprilia	29	+1 lap	29	
20	41	(Netherlands) Jarno Janssen	TSR-Honda	29	+1 lap	24	
21	84	(Germany) Dirk Heidolf	Honda	29	+1 lap	28	
22	22	(Spain) Lucas Oliver Bultó	Yamaha	29	+1 lap	23	
23	83	(Germany) Christian Gemmel	Honda	29	+1 lap	30	
24	58	(Argentina) Matías Ríos	Aprilia	29	+1 lap	27	
Ret	9	(United Kingdom) Jeremy McWilliams	Aprilia	12	Retirement	5	
Ret	21	(Italy) Franco Battaini	Aprilia	5	Accident	2	
DSQ	16	(Sweden) Johan Stigefelt	Yamaha	3	Black flag	18	
Ret	82	(Germany) Dirk Brockman	Honda	3	Retirement	31	
Ret	15	(Spain) David García	Yamaha	3	Retirement	25	
Ret	4	(Japan) Tohru Ukawa	Honda	2	Accident	7	
Ret	24	(United Kingdom) Jason Vincent	Honda	1	Accident	17	

== 125 cc classification ==
Pos.	No.	Rider	Manufacturer	Laps	Time/Retired	Grid	Points
1	13	(Italy) Marco Melandri	Honda	29	44:13.126	1	25
2	7	(Spain) Emilio Alzamora	Honda	29	+0.182	2	20
3	5	(Italy) Lucio Cecchinello	Honda	29	+0.720	7	16
4	15	(Italy) Roberto Locatelli	Aprilia	29	+1.449	3	13
5	6	(Japan) Noboru Ueda	Honda	29	+19.138	11	11
6	4	(Japan) Masao Azuma	Honda	29	+19.267	9	10
7	8	(Italy) Gianluigi Scalvini	Aprilia	29	+21.524	4	9
8	23	(Italy) Gino Borsoi	Aprilia	29	+23.276	12	8
9	16	(Italy) Simone Sanna	Honda	29	+23.652	14	7
10	21	(France) Arnaud Vincent	Aprilia	29	+23.897	16	6
11	54	(San Marino) Manuel Poggiali	Aprilia	29	+24.086	15	5
12	26	(Italy) Ivan Goi	Honda	29	+29.091	8	4
13	32	(Italy) Mirko Giansanti	Aprilia	29	+30.875	17	3
14	78	(Germany) Klaus Nöhles	Honda	29	+31.576	6	2
15	12	(France) Randy de Puniet	Aprilia	29	+32.348	13	1
16	10	(Spain) Jerónimo Vidal	Aprilia	29	+33.643	10	
17	17	(Germany) Steve Jenkner	Aprilia	29	+43.119	19	
18	18	(Germany) Reinhard Stolz	Honda	29	+47.707	22	
19	1	(Japan) Kazuto Sakata	Honda	29	+1:01.204	18	
20	29	(Spain) Ángel Nieto, Jr.	Honda	29	+1:01.456	25	
21	80	(Germany) Maik Stief	Honda	29	+1:02.028	26	
22	76	(Germany) Philipp Hafeneger	Honda	29	+1:02.220	29	
23	79	(Germany) Dirk Reissmann	Aprilia	29	+1:09.100	28	
Ret	77	(Germany) Jarno Müller	Honda	24	Accident	23	
Ret	20	(Germany) Bernhard Absmeier	Aprilia	21	Accident	20	
Ret	41	(Japan) Youichi Ui	Derbi	20	Retirement	5	
Ret	44	(Italy) Alessandro Brannetti	Aprilia	6	Accident	27	
Ret	11	(Italy) Max Sabbatani	Honda	6	Accident	21	
Ret	22	(Spain) Pablo Nieto	Derbi	0	Accident	24	
DNS	9	(France) Frédéric Petit	Aprilia		Did not start		

== Championship standings after the race (500cc) ==
Below are the standings for the top five riders and constructors after round nine has concluded.

Riders' Championship standings

Pos.	Rider	Points
1	(Spain) Àlex Crivillé	174
2	(United States) Kenny Roberts Jr.	127
3	(Japan) Tadayuki Okada	113
4	(Spain) Sete Gibernau	95
5	(Spain) Carlos Checa	78

Constructors' Championship standings

Pos.	Constructor	Points
1	(Japan) Honda	206
2	(Japan) Yamaha	136
3	(Japan) Suzuki	127
4	(Italy) Aprilia	75
5	(Japan) TSR-Honda	38

- Note: Only the top five positions are included for both sets of standings.

Previous race: 1999 British Grand Prix	FIM Grand Prix World Championship; 1999 season	Next race: 1999 Czech Republic Grand Prix
Previous race: 1998 German Grand Prix	German Grand Prix	Next race: 2000 German Grand Prix
