= 1999 Czech Republic motorcycle Grand Prix =

1999 Czech Republic Grand Prix
Race details
- Race 10 of 16 races in the 1999 Grand Prix motorcycle racing season
- Date: 22 August 1999
- Official name: Grand Prix České republiky
- Location: Brno
- Course: Permanent racing facility; 5.403 km (3.357 mi)

500cc
Pole position
- Rider: (Netherlands) Jurgen van den Goorbergh
- Time: 2:01.572
Fastest lap
- Rider: (Japan) Tadayuki Okada
- Time: 2:02.661 on lap 22
Podium
- First: (Japan) Tadayuki Okada
- Second: (Spain) Àlex Crivillé
- Third: (United States) Kenny Roberts Jr.

250cc
Pole position
- Rider: (Germany) Ralf Waldmann
- Time: 2:04.158
Fastest lap
- Rider: (Italy) Valentino Rossi
- Time: 2:04.469 on lap 16
Podium
- First: (Italy) Valentino Rossi
- Second: (Germany) Ralf Waldmann
- Third: (Japan) Tohru Ukawa

125cc
Pole position
- Rider: (Italy) Roberto Locatelli
- Time: 2:09.384
Fastest lap
- Rider: (Italy) Marco Melandri
- Time: 2:09.617 on lap 7
Podium
- First: (Italy) Marco Melandri
- Second: (Japan) Noboru Ueda
- Third: (Italy) Lucio Cecchinello

The 1999 Czech Republic motorcycle Grand Prix was the tenth round of the 1999 Grand Prix motorcycle racing season. It took place on 22 August 1999 at the Masaryk Circuit located in Brno, Czech Republic. The race was marred by James Whitham's fiery crash that caused a lengthy delay to the race.

== 500 cc classification ==
Pos.	No.	Rider	Team	Manufacturer	Laps	Time/Retired	Grid	Points
1	8	(Japan) Tadayuki Okada	Repsol Honda Team	Honda	22	45:18.066	6	25
2	3	(Spain) Àlex Crivillé	Repsol Honda Team	Honda	22	+0.240	2	20
3	10	(United States) Kenny Roberts Jr.	Suzuki Grand Prix Team	Suzuki	22	+1.858	5	16
4	2	(Italy) Max Biaggi	Marlboro Yamaha Team	Yamaha	22	+2.205	3	13
5	31	(Japan) Tetsuya Harada	Aprilia Grand Prix Racing	Aprilia	22	+3.827	4	11
6	9	(Japan) Nobuatsu Aoki	Suzuki Grand Prix Team	Suzuki	22	+4.032	11	10
7	5	(Brazil) Alex Barros	Movistar Honda Pons	Honda	22	+9.815	8	9
8	24	(Australia) Garry McCoy	Red Bull Yamaha WCM	Yamaha	22	+17.181	12	8
9	55	(France) Régis Laconi	Red Bull Yamaha WCM	Yamaha	22	+17.408	13	7
10	15	(Spain) Sete Gibernau	Repsol Honda Team	Honda	22	+17.593	15	6
11	17	(Netherlands) Jurgen van den Goorbergh	Team Biland GP1	MuZ Weber	22	+32.221	1	5
12	14	(Spain) Juan Borja	Movistar Honda Pons	Honda	22	+34.519	14	4
13	26	(Japan) Haruchika Aoki	FCC TSR	TSR-Honda	22	+37.566	16	3
14	19	(United States) John Kocinski	Kanemoto Honda	Honda	22	+48.323	10	2
15	20	(United States) Mike Hale	Proton KR Modenas	Modenas KR3	22	+1:10.496	21	1
16	68	(Australia) Mark Willis	Buckley Systems BSL Racing	Modenas KR3	22	+1:28.349	22	
Ret	6	(Japan) Norifumi Abe	Antena 3 Yamaha d'Antin	Yamaha	16	Retirement	9	
Ret	22	(France) Sébastien Gimbert	Tecmas Honda Elf	Honda	12	Retirement	20	
Ret	21	(United Kingdom) Michael Rutter	Millar Honda	Honda	12	Retirement	23	
Ret	4	(Spain) Carlos Checa	Marlboro Yamaha Team	Yamaha	9	Retirement	7	
Ret	52	(Spain) José David de Gea	Dee Cee Jeans Racing Team	Honda	1	Retirement	24	
DNS	25	(Spain) José Luis Cardoso	Team Maxon TSR	TSR-Honda	0	Did not start	19	
DNS	69	(United Kingdom) James Whitham	Proton KR Modenas	Modenas KR3	0	Did not start	18	
DNS	7	(Italy) Luca Cadalora	Team Biland GP1	MuZ Weber	0	Did not start	17	

== 250 cc classification ==
Pos.	No.	Rider	Manufacturer	Laps	Time/Retired	Grid	Points
1	46	(Italy) Valentino Rossi	Aprilia	20	41:48.114	3	25
2	6	(Germany) Ralf Waldmann	Aprilia	20	+0.700	1	20
3	4	(Japan) Tohru Ukawa	Honda	20	+2.833	5	16
4	56	(Japan) Shinya Nakano	Yamaha	20	+6.206	6	13
5	19	(France) Olivier Jacque	Yamaha	20	+11.776	11	11
6	7	(Italy) Stefano Perugini	Honda	20	+11.989	4	10
7	1	(Italy) Loris Capirossi	Honda	20	+20.421	2	9
8	9	(United Kingdom) Jeremy McWilliams	Aprilia	20	+21.842	7	8
9	24	(United Kingdom) Jason Vincent	Honda	20	+30.956	9	7
10	21	(Italy) Franco Battaini	Aprilia	20	+34.465	8	6
11	44	(Italy) Roberto Rolfo	Aprilia	20	+40.974	12	5
12	36	(Japan) Masaki Tokudome	TSR-Honda	20	+54.621	16	4
13	37	(Italy) Luca Boscoscuro	TSR-Honda	20	+54.787	18	3
14	11	(Japan) Tomomi Manako	Yamaha	20	+59.356	14	2
15	14	(Australia) Anthony West	TSR-Honda	20	+1:02.158	19	1
16	15	(Spain) David García	Yamaha	20	+1:02.230	21	
17	10	(Spain) Fonsi Nieto	Yamaha	20	+1:21.428	25	
18	41	(Netherlands) Jarno Janssen	TSR-Honda	20	+1:24.496	20	
19	22	(Spain) Lucas Oliver	Yamaha	20	+1:37.607	23	
20	58	(Argentina) Matías Ríos	Aprilia	20	+1:50.008	27	
21	86	(Slovakia) Vladimír Častka	Honda	20	+1:50.168	26	
Ret	12	(Argentina) Sebastián Porto	Yamaha	17	Accident	10	
Ret	18	(United Kingdom) Scott Smart	Aprilia	15	Retirement	22	
Ret	23	(France) Julien Allemand	TSR-Honda	10	Accident	13	
Ret	87	(Czech Republic) Radomil Rous	Honda	10	Retirement	29	
Ret	17	(Netherlands) Maurice Bolwerk	TSR-Honda	9	Accident	17	
Ret	66	(Germany) Alex Hofmann	TSR-Honda	5	Accident	15	
Ret	89	(Germany) Lars Langer	Yamaha	4	Retirement	30	
Ret	73	(Netherlands) Arno Visscher	Aprilia	2	Retirement	28	
Ret	16	(Sweden) Johan Stigefelt	Yamaha	0	Accident	24	
DNQ	88	(Czech Republic) Lukáš Vavrečka	Honda		Did not qualify		

== 125 cc classification ==
Pos.	No.	Rider	Manufacturer	Laps	Time/Retired	Grid	Points
1	13	(Italy) Marco Melandri	Honda	19	41:23.897	3	25
2	6	(Japan) Noboru Ueda	Honda	19	+11.672	2	20
3	5	(Italy) Lucio Cecchinello	Honda	19	+11.717	4	16
4	8	(Italy) Gianluigi Scalvini	Aprilia	19	+11.785	6	13
5	41	(Japan) Youichi Ui	Derbi	19	+21.012	8	11
6	7	(Spain) Emilio Alzamora	Honda	19	+24.598	5	10
7	17	(Germany) Steve Jenkner	Aprilia	19	+24.739	17	9
8	16	(Italy) Simone Sanna	Honda	19	+24.801	7	8
9	23	(Italy) Gino Borsoi	Aprilia	19	+24.979	14	7
10	21	(France) Arnaud Vincent	Aprilia	19	+40.513	9	6
11	26	(Italy) Ivan Goi	Honda	19	+41.599	24	5
12	4	(Japan) Masao Azuma	Honda	19	+41.706	11	4
13	78	(Germany) Klaus Nöhles	Honda	19	+41.740	12	3
14	18	(Germany) Reinhard Stolz	Honda	19	+41.771	21	2
15	32	(Italy) Mirko Giansanti	Aprilia	19	+42.289	10	1
16	29	(Spain) Ángel Nieto, Jr.	Honda	19	+42.356	22	
17	10	(Spain) Jerónimo Vidal	Aprilia	19	+42.469	23	
18	44	(Italy) Alessandro Brannetti	Aprilia	19	+1:01.337	20	
19	20	(Germany) Bernhard Absmeier	Aprilia	19	+1:01.420	18	
20	11	(Italy) Max Sabbatani	Honda	19	+1:23.838	15	
21	82	(Czech Republic) Jakub Smrž	Honda	19	+1:24.629	25	
22	22	(Spain) Pablo Nieto	Derbi	19	+1:26.068	27	
23	84	(Czech Republic) Igor Kaláb	Honda	19	+1:26.406	26	
Ret	15	(Italy) Roberto Locatelli	Aprilia	18	Accident	1	
Ret	81	(Czech Republic) Jaroslav Huleš	Italjet	15	Retirement	19	
Ret	1	(Japan) Kazuto Sakata	Honda	12	Retirement	13	
Ret	12	(France) Randy de Puniet	Aprilia	4	Retirement	16	
DNQ	83	(Czech Republic) Michal Březina	Honda		Did not qualify		
WD	54	(San Marino) Manuel Poggiali	Aprilia		Withdrew		

== Championship standings after the race (500cc) ==
Below are the standings for the top five riders and constructors after round ten has concluded.

Riders' Championship standings

Pos.	Rider	Points
1	(Spain) Àlex Crivillé	194
2	(United States) Kenny Roberts Jr.	143
3	(Japan) Tadayuki Okada	138
4	(Spain) Sete Gibernau	101
5	(Japan) Tetsuya Harada	86

Constructors' Championship standings

Pos.	Constructor	Points
1	(Japan) Honda	231
2	(Japan) Yamaha	149
3	(Japan) Suzuki	143
4	(Italy) Aprilia	86
5	(Germany) MuZ Weber	43

- Note: Only the top five positions are included for both sets of standings.

Previous race: 1999 German Grand Prix	FIM Grand Prix World Championship; 1999 season	Next race: 1999 City of Imola Grand Prix
Previous race: 1998 Czech Republic Grand Prix	Czech Republic Grand Prix	Next race: 2000 Czech Republic Grand Prix
