= 1999 South African motorcycle Grand Prix =

(South Africa) 1999 South African Grand Prix
Race details
- Race 14 of 16 races in the 1999 Grand Prix motorcycle racing season
- Date: 10 October 1999
- Official name: South African Grand Prix
- Location: Phakisa Freeway
- Course: Permanent racing facility; 4.242 km (2.636 mi)

500cc
Pole position
- Rider: (Japan) Tadayuki Okada
- Time: 1:35.930
Fastest lap
- Rider: (Spain) Sete Gibernau
- Time: 1:36.554 on lap 24
Podium
- First: (Italy) Max Biaggi
- Second: (Spain) Sete Gibernau
- Third: (Spain) Àlex Crivillé

250cc
Pole position
- Rider: (Italy) Loris Capirossi
- Time: 1:38.287
Fastest lap
- Rider: (Italy) Valentino Rossi
- Time: 1:37.624 on lap 9
Podium
- First: (Italy) Valentino Rossi
- Second: (Japan) Shinya Nakano
- Third: (France) Olivier Jacque

125cc
Pole position
- Rider: (Italy) Gianluigi Scalvini
- Time: 1:43.404
Fastest lap
- Rider: (Italy) Gianluigi Scalvini
- Time: 1:43.324 on lap 24
Podium
- First: (Italy) Gianluigi Scalvini
- Second: (France) Arnaud Vincent
- Third: (Italy) Marco Melandri

The 1999 South African motorcycle Grand Prix was the fourteenth round of the 1999 Grand Prix motorcycle racing season. It took place on 10 October 1999 at Phakisa Freeway.

== 500 cc classification ==
Pos.	No.	Rider	Team	Manufacturer	Laps	Time/Retired	Grid	Points
1	2	(Italy) Max Biaggi	Marlboro Yamaha Team	Yamaha	28	45:24.602	2	25
2	15	(Spain) Sete Gibernau	Repsol Honda Team	Honda	28	+4.822	3	20
3	3	(Spain) Àlex Crivillé	Repsol Honda Team	Honda	28	+5.138	6	16
4	8	(Japan) Tadayuki Okada	Repsol Honda Team	Honda	28	+10.432	1	13
5	14	(Spain) Juan Borja	Movistar Honda Pons	Honda	28	+14.187	5	11
6	4	(Spain) Carlos Checa	Marlboro Yamaha Team	Yamaha	28	+14.282	7	10
7	9	(Japan) Nobuatsu Aoki	Suzuki Grand Prix Team	Suzuki	28	+22.636	14	9
8	24	(Australia) Garry McCoy	Red Bull Yamaha WCM	Yamaha	28	+33.224	13	8
9	6	(Japan) Norick Abe	Antena 3 Yamaha d'Antin	Yamaha	28	+41.357	11	7
10	19	(United States) John Kocinski	Kanemoto Nettaxi Honda	Honda	28	+44.052	9	6
11	5	(Brazil) Alex Barros	Movistar Honda Pons	Honda	28	+56.083	8	5
12	26	(Japan) Haruchika Aoki	FCC TSR	TSR-Honda	28	+56.443	15	4
13	17	(Netherlands) Jurgen van den Goorbergh	Team Biland GP1	MuZ Weber	28	+57.117	10	3
14	55	(France) Régis Laconi	Red Bull Yamaha WCM	Yamaha	28	+59.166	12	2
15	31	(Japan) Tetsuya Harada	Aprilia Grand Prix Racing	Aprilia	28	+59.290	17	1
16	68	(Australia) Mark Willis	Buckley Systems BSL Racing	Modenas KR3	28	+1:06.003	16	
17	25	(Spain) José Luis Cardoso	Team Maxon TSR	TSR-Honda	28	+1:11.108	24	
18	35	(Australia) Anthony Gobert	Team Biland GP1	MuZ Weber	28	+1:17.861	19	
19	22	(France) Sébastien Gimbert	Tecmas Honda Elf	Honda	28	+1:18.332	20	
20	52	(Spain) José David de Gea	Proton KR Modenas	Modenas KR3	28	+1:25.564	18	
21	37	(Australia) Steve Martin	Dee Cee Jeans Racing Team	Honda	28	+1:25.971	22	
22	10	(United States) Kenny Roberts Jr.	Suzuki Grand Prix Team	Suzuki	27	+1 lap	4	
Ret	21	(United Kingdom) Michael Rutter	Millar Honda	Honda	9	Retirement	23	
Ret	20	(United States) Mike Hale	Proton KR Modenas	Modenas KR3	5	Retirement	21	

== 250 cc classification ==
Pos.	No.	Rider	Manufacturer	Laps	Time/Retired	Grid	Points
1	46	(Italy) Valentino Rossi	Aprilia	26	42:57.870	6	25
2	56	(Japan) Shinya Nakano	Yamaha	26	+1.913	2	20
3	19	(France) Olivier Jacque	Yamaha	26	+3.862	4	16
4	4	(Japan) Tohru Ukawa	Honda	26	+4.131	3	13
5	1	(Italy) Loris Capirossi	Honda	26	+19.739	1	11
6	12	(Argentina) Sebastián Porto	Yamaha	26	+23.224	9	10
7	7	(Italy) Stefano Perugini	Honda	26	+26.461	7	9
8	37	(Italy) Luca Boscoscuro	TSR-Honda	26	+28.366	11	8
9	14	(Australia) Anthony West	TSR-Honda	26	+37.644	13	7
10	21	(Italy) Franco Battaini	Aprilia	26	+42.837	10	6
11	24	(United Kingdom) Jason Vincent	Honda	26	+45.558	12	5
12	11	(Japan) Tomomi Manako	Yamaha	26	+51.489	5	4
13	66	(Germany) Alex Hofmann	TSR-Honda	26	+57.309	16	3
14	36	(Japan) Masaki Tokudome	TSR-Honda	26	+57.544	14	2
15	10	(Spain) Fonsi Nieto	Yamaha	26	+1:35.573	21	1
16	79	(South Africa) Shane Norval	Honda	26	+1:42.183	20	
17	16	(Sweden) Johan Stigefelt	Yamaha	25	+1 lap	24	
18	17	(Netherlands) Maurice Bolwerk	TSR-Honda	25	+1 lap	15	
19	80	(United Kingdom) Adrian Coates	Aprilia	25	+1 lap	18	
20	32	(Germany) Markus Barth	Yamaha	25	+1 lap	23	
Ret	41	(Netherlands) Jarno Janssen	TSR-Honda	24	Retirement	17	
Ret	58	(Argentina) Matías Ríos	Aprilia	15	Retirement	22	
Ret	23	(France) Julien Allemand	TSR-Honda	4	Accident	19	
Ret	18	(United Kingdom) Scott Smart	Aprilia	3	Retirement	25	
Ret	6	(Germany) Ralf Waldmann	Aprilia	0	Accident	8	
DNS	15	(Spain) David García	Yamaha		Did not start		

== 125 cc classification ==
Pos.	No.	Rider	Manufacturer	Laps	Time/Retired	Grid	Points
1	8	(Italy) Gianluigi Scalvini	Aprilia	24	41:41.665	1	25
2	21	(France) Arnaud Vincent	Aprilia	24	+0.660	4	20
3	13	(Italy) Marco Melandri	Honda	24	+0.844	2	16
4	15	(Italy) Roberto Locatelli	Aprilia	24	+8.084	6	13
5	23	(Italy) Gino Borsoi	Aprilia	24	+17.277	15	11
6	16	(Italy) Simone Sanna	Honda	24	+17.667	3	10
7	41	(Japan) Youichi Ui	Derbi	24	+22.769	11	9
8	5	(Italy) Lucio Cecchinello	Honda	24	+23.794	14	8
9	44	(Italy) Alessandro Brannetti	Aprilia	24	+24.187	16	7
10	10	(Spain) Jerónimo Vidal	Aprilia	24	+35.785	9	6
11	17	(Germany) Steve Jenkner	Aprilia	24	+38.565	20	5
12	22	(Spain) Pablo Nieto	Derbi	24	+39.264	13	4
13	29	(Spain) Ángel Nieto, Jr.	Honda	24	+50.228	18	3
14	4	(Japan) Masao Azuma	Honda	24	+53.917	8	2
15	1	(Japan) Kazuto Sakata	Honda	24	+54.458	19	1
16	11	(Italy) Max Sabbatani	Honda	24	+54.733	21	
17	18	(Germany) Reinhard Stolz	Honda	24	+56.884	23	
18	9	(France) Frédéric Petit	Aprilia	24	+1:00.750	22	
19	94	(South Africa) Beaumont Levy	Honda	24	+1:39.377	25	
Ret	7	(Spain) Emilio Alzamora	Honda	11	Accident	12	
Ret	26	(Italy) Ivan Goi	Honda	11	Accident	7	
Ret	6	(Japan) Noboru Ueda	Honda	11	Accident	5	
Ret	32	(Italy) Mirko Giansanti	Aprilia	10	Retirement	10	
Ret	24	(Denmark) Robbin Harms	Aprilia	9	Retirement	26	
Ret	12	(France) Randy de Puniet	Aprilia	7	Retirement	24	
Ret	54	(San Marino) Manuel Poggiali	Aprilia	6	Retirement	17	
DNQ	93	(South Africa) Robert Portman	Honda		Did not qualify		

== Championship standings after the race (500cc) ==
Below are the standings for the top five riders and constructors after round fourteen has concluded.

Riders' Championship standings

Pos.	Rider	Points
1	(Spain) Àlex Crivillé	246
2	(Japan) Tadayuki Okada	202
3	(United States) Kenny Roberts Jr.	179
4	(Italy) Max Biaggi	154
5	(Spain) Sete Gibernau	144

Constructors' Championship standings

Pos.	Constructor	Points
1	(Japan) Honda	314
2	(Japan) Yamaha	235
3	(Japan) Suzuki	190
4	(Italy) Aprilia	95
5	(Japan) TSR-Honda	54

- Note: Only the top five positions are included for both sets of standings.

Previous race: 1999 Australian Grand Prix	FIM Grand Prix World Championship; 1999 season	Next race: 1999 Rio de Janeiro Grand Prix
Previous race: 1992 South African Grand Prix	South African Grand Prix	Next race: 2000 South African Grand Prix
