= 1999 City of Imola motorcycle Grand Prix =

(Bologna) 1999 City of Imola Grand Prix
Race details
- Race 11 of 16 races in the 1999 Grand Prix motorcycle racing season
- Date: 5 September 1999
- Official name: Gran Premio Breil Città di Imola
- Location: Autodromo Enzo e Dino Ferrari
- Course: Permanent racing facility; 4.930 km (3.063 mi)

500cc
Pole position
- Rider: (Spain) Àlex Crivillé
- Time: 1:48.750
Fastest lap
- Rider: (Brazil) Alex Barros
- Time: 1:49.339
Podium
- First: (Spain) Àlex Crivillé
- Second: (Brazil) Alex Barros
- Third: (Italy) Max Biaggi

250cc
Pole position
- Rider: (France) Olivier Jacque
- Time: 1:51.929
Fastest lap
- Rider: (Italy) Stefano Perugini
- Time: 1:52.138
Podium
- First: (Italy) Loris Capirossi
- Second: (Italy) Valentino Rossi
- Third: (France) Olivier Jacque

125cc
Pole position
- Rider: (Italy) Marco Melandri
- Time: 1:58.141
Fastest lap
- Rider: (Italy) Roberto Locatelli
- Time: 1:59.606
Podium
- First: (Italy) Marco Melandri
- Second: (Italy) Simone Sanna
- Third: (France) Arnaud Vincent

The 1999 City of Imola motorcycle Grand Prix was the eleventh round of the 1999 Grand Prix motorcycle racing season. It took place on 5 September 1999 at Imola.

== 500 cc classification ==
Pos.	No.	Rider	Team	Manufacturer	Laps	Time/Retired	Grid	Points
1	3	(Spain) Àlex Crivillé	Repsol Honda Team	Honda	25	46:05.244	1	25
2	5	(Brazil) Alex Barros	Movistar Honda Pons	Honda	25	+0.265	3	20
3	2	(Italy) Max Biaggi	Marlboro Yamaha Team	Yamaha	25	+6.383	7	16
4	8	(Japan) Tadayuki Okada	Repsol Honda Team	Honda	25	+8.987	5	13
5	55	(France) Régis Laconi	Red Bull Yamaha WCM	Yamaha	25	+10.449	8	11
6	10	(United States) Kenny Roberts Jr.	Suzuki Grand Prix Team	Suzuki	25	+12.366	2	10
7	9	(Japan) Nobuatsu Aoki	Suzuki Grand Prix Team	Suzuki	25	+14.948	10	9
8	19	(United States) John Kocinski	Kanemoto Nettaxi Honda	Honda	25	+17.719	9	8
9	24	(Australia) Garry McCoy	Red Bull Yamaha WCM	Yamaha	25	+28.910	12	7
10	15	(Spain) Sete Gibernau	Repsol Honda Team	Honda	25	+29.015	11	6
11	6	(Japan) Norick Abe	Antena 3 Yamaha d'Antin	Yamaha	25	+34.810	6	5
12	26	(Japan) Haruchika Aoki	FCC TSR	TSR-Honda	25	+53.188	14	4
13	31	(Japan) Tetsuya Harada	Aprilia Grand Prix Racing	Aprilia	25	+1:01.810	13	3
14	17	(Netherlands) Jurgen van den Goorbergh	Team Biland GP1	MuZ Weber	25	+1:07.100	16	2
15	20	(United States) Mike Hale	Proton KR Modenas	Modenas KR3	25	+1:11.127	17	1
16	22	(France) Sébastien Gimbert	Tecmas Honda Elf	Honda	25	+1:20.873	18	
17	68	(Australia) Mark Willis	Buckley Systems BSL Racing	Modenas KR3	25	+1:21.602	20	
Ret	25	(Spain) José Luis Cardoso	Team Maxon TSR	TSR-Honda	12	Retirement	19	
Ret	52	(Spain) José David de Gea	Dee Cee Jeans Racing Team	Honda	9	Retirement	22	
Ret	14	(Spain) Juan Borja	Movistar Honda Pons	Honda	5	Accident	15	
Ret	21	(United Kingdom) Michael Rutter	Millar Honda	Honda	4	Retirement	21	
Ret	4	(Spain) Carlos Checa	Marlboro Yamaha Team	Yamaha	3	Retirement	4	
Ret	27	(France) Bernard Garcia	Team Biland GP1	MuZ Weber	1	Accident	23	

== 250 cc classification ==
Pos.	No.	Rider	Manufacturer	Laps	Time/Retired	Grid	Points
1	1	(Italy) Loris Capirossi	Honda	23	43:23.269	2	25
2	46	(Italy) Valentino Rossi	Aprilia	23	+8.248	3	20
3	19	(France) Olivier Jacque	Yamaha	23	+9.971	1	16
4	7	(Italy) Stefano Perugini	Honda	23	+11.758	4	13
5	56	(Japan) Shinya Nakano	Yamaha	23	+17.488	8	11
6	21	(Italy) Franco Battaini	Aprilia	23	+21.322	6	10
7	6	(Germany) Ralf Waldmann	Aprilia	23	+23.134	5	9
8	34	(Italy) Marcellino Lucchi	Aprilia	23	+24.194	7	8
9	12	(Argentina) Sebastián Porto	Yamaha	23	+36.966	12	7
10	44	(Italy) Roberto Rolfo	Aprilia	23	+37.617	11	6
11	37	(Italy) Luca Boscoscuro	TSR-Honda	23	+39.093	13	5
12	4	(Japan) Tohru Ukawa	Honda	23	+56.984	9	4
13	9	(United Kingdom) Jeremy McWilliams	Aprilia	23	+1:05.262	10	3
14	11	(Japan) Tomomi Manako	Yamaha	23	+1:06.453	16	2
15	14	(Australia) Anthony West	TSR-Honda	23	+1:11.239	19	1
16	36	(Japan) Masaki Tokudome	TSR-Honda	23	+1:11.844	17	
17	66	(Germany) Alex Hofmann	TSR-Honda	23	+1:21.088	20	
18	10	(Spain) Fonsi Nieto	Yamaha	23	+1:49.572	26	
19	16	(Sweden) Johan Stigefelt	Yamaha	23	+1:50.453	25	
20	22	(Spain) Lucas Oliver Bultó	Yamaha	22	+1 lap	22	
21	90	(Italy) Stefano Pennese	Aprilia	22	+1 lap	27	
Ret	35	(Italy) Mario De Matteo	Aprilia	21	Retirement	30	
Ret	58	(Argentina) Matías Ríos	Aprilia	19	Retirement	29	
Ret	18	(United Kingdom) Scott Smart	Aprilia	13	Retirement	21	
Ret	17	(Netherlands) Maurice Bolwerk	TSR-Honda	10	Accident	18	
Ret	24	(United Kingdom) Jason Vincent	Honda	8	Accident	14	
Ret	23	(France) Julien Allemand	TSR-Honda	7	Accident	15	
Ret	48	(Italy) Ivan Clementi	Aprilia	7	Retirement	28	
Ret	15	(Spain) David García	Yamaha	6	Accident	24	
Ret	41	(Netherlands) Jarno Janssen	TSR-Honda	1	Retirement	23	

== 125 cc classification ==
Pos.	No.	Rider	Manufacturer	Laps	Time/Retired	Grid	Points
1	13	(Italy) Marco Melandri	Honda	21	42:26.648	1	25
2	16	(Italy) Simone Sanna	Honda	21	+1.244	3	20
3	21	(France) Arnaud Vincent	Aprilia	21	+1.535	4	16
4	7	(Spain) Emilio Alzamora	Honda	21	+2.211	6	13
5	6	(Japan) Noboru Ueda	Honda	21	+2.276	15	11
6	26	(Italy) Ivan Goi	Honda	21	+12.586	12	10
7	17	(Germany) Steve Jenkner	Aprilia	21	+12.701	10	9
8	54	(San Marino) Manuel Poggiali	Aprilia	21	+13.112	11	8
9	41	(Japan) Youichi Ui	Derbi	21	+14.186	5	7
10	4	(Japan) Masao Azuma	Honda	21	+15.188	13	6
11	15	(Italy) Roberto Locatelli	Aprilia	21	+26.791	7	5
12	37	(San Marino) William de Angelis	Honda	21	+33.998	14	4
13	32	(Italy) Mirko Giansanti	Aprilia	21	+48.189	18	3
14	18	(Germany) Reinhard Stolz	Honda	21	+48.758	22	2
15	44	(Italy) Alessandro Brannetti	Aprilia	21	+48.819	17	1
16	9	(France) Frédéric Petit	Aprilia	21	+49.190	16	
17	22	(Spain) Pablo Nieto	Derbi	21	+52.817	26	
18	10	(Spain) Jerónimo Vidal	Aprilia	21	+52.832	20	
19	8	(Italy) Gianluigi Scalvini	Aprilia	21	+1:15.177	9	
20	39	(Italy) Cristian Magnani	Aprilia	20	+1 lap	28	
Ret	23	(Italy) Gino Borsoi	Aprilia	18	Retirement	2	
Ret	12	(France) Randy de Puniet	Aprilia	13	Retirement	23	
Ret	36	(San Marino) Alex de Angelis	Honda	12	Accident	25	
Ret	5	(Italy) Lucio Cecchinello	Honda	10	Accident	8	
Ret	29	(Spain) Ángel Nieto, Jr.	Honda	8	Retirement	27	
Ret	81	(Czech Republic) Jaroslav Huleš	Italjet	7	Retirement	24	
Ret	20	(Germany) Bernhard Absmeier	Aprilia	6	Accident	29	
Ret	1	(Japan) Kazuto Sakata	Honda	2	Accident	19	
Ret	11	(Italy) Max Sabbatani	Honda	0	Accident	21	
DNS	38	(Italy) Diego Giugovaz	Aprilia		Did not start		

== Championship standings after the race (500cc) ==
Below are the standings for the top five riders and constructors after round eleven has concluded.

Riders' Championship standings

Pos.	Rider	Points
1	(Spain) Àlex Crivillé	219
2	(United States) Kenny Roberts Jr.	153
3	(Japan) Tadayuki Okada	151
4	(Spain) Sete Gibernau	107
5	(Italy) Max Biaggi	100

Constructors' Championship standings

Pos.	Constructor	Points
1	(Japan) Honda	256
2	(Japan) Yamaha	165
3	(Japan) Suzuki	153
4	(Italy) Aprilia	89
5	(Germany) MuZ Weber	52

- Note: Only the top five positions are included for both sets of standings.

Previous race: 1999 Czech Republic Grand Prix	FIM Grand Prix World Championship; 1999 season	Next race: 1999 Valencian Grand Prix
Previous race: 1998 Imola Grand Prix	Imola Grand Prix	Next race: None
