= 1999 British motorcycle Grand Prix =

(United Kingdom) 1999 British Grand Prix
Race details
- Race 8 of 16 races in the 1999 Grand Prix motorcycle racing season
- Date: 4 July 1999
- Official name: British Grand Prix
- Location: Donington Park
- Course: Permanent racing facility; 4.023 km (2.500 mi)

500cc
Pole position
- Rider: (Japan) Tadayuki Okada
- Time: 1:32.597
Fastest lap
- Rider: (Spain) Àlex Crivillé
- Time: 1:33.348 on lap 6
Podium
- First: (Spain) Àlex Crivillé
- Second: (Japan) Tadayuki Okada
- Third: (Japan) Tetsuya Harada

250cc
Pole position
- Rider: (Italy) Loris Capirossi
- Time: 1:34.277
Fastest lap
- Rider: (Italy) Loris Capirossi
- Time: 1:34.448 on lap 11
Podium
- First: (Italy) Valentino Rossi
- Second: (Italy) Loris Capirossi
- Third: (Japan) Shinya Nakano

125cc
Pole position
- Rider: (Italy) Gianluigi Scalvini
- Time: 1:39.614
Fastest lap
- Rider: (Italy) Roberto Locatelli
- Time: 1:39.103 on lap 8
Podium
- First: (Japan) Masao Azuma
- Second: (Japan) Noboru Ueda
- Third: (Spain) Emilio Alzamora

The 1999 British motorcycle Grand Prix was the eighth round of the 1999 Grand Prix motorcycle racing season. It took place on 4 July 1999 at Donington Park.

== 500 cc classification ==
| Pos. | No. | Rider | Team | Manufacturer | Laps | Time/Retired | Grid | Points |
|---|---|---|---|---|---|---|---|---|
| 1 | 3 | (Spain) Àlex Crivillé | Repsol Honda Team | Honda | 30 | 47:06.290 | 2 | 25 |
| 2 | 8 | (Japan) Tadayuki Okada | Repsol Honda Team | Honda | 30 | +0.536 | 1 | 20 |
| 3 | 31 | (Japan) Tetsuya Harada | Aprilia Grand Prix Racing | Aprilia | 30 | +0.981 | 7 | 16 |
| 4 | 2 | (Italy) Max Biaggi | Marlboro Yamaha Team | Yamaha | 30 | +10.020 | 3 | 13 |
| 5 | 5 | (Brazil) Alex Barros | Movistar Honda Pons | Honda | 30 | +21.316 | 10 | 11 |
| 6 | 6 | (Japan) Norifumi Abe | Antena 3 Yamaha d'Antin | Yamaha | 30 | +21.491 | 4 | 10 |
| 7 | 14 | (Spain) Juan Borja | Movistar Honda Pons | Honda | 30 | +21.959 | 6 | 9 |
| 8 | 10 | (United States) Kenny Roberts Jr. | Suzuki Grand Prix Team | Suzuki | 30 | +22.230 | 5 | 8 |
| 9 | 19 | (United States) John Kocinski | Kanemoto Honda | Honda | 30 | +1:01.073 | 9 | 7 |
| 10 | 11 | (New Zealand) Simon Crafar | Team Biland GP1 | MuZ Weber | 30 | +1:06.969 | 18 | 6 |
| 11 | 21 | (United Kingdom) Michael Rutter | Millar Honda | Honda | 29 | +1 lap | 20 | 5 |
| Ret | 55 | (France) Régis Laconi | Red Bull Yamaha WCM | Yamaha | 25 | Accident | 8 | |
| Ret | 46 | (United Kingdom) John McGuinness | Team Vimto Honda | Honda | 23 | Retirement | 21 | |
| Ret | 26 | (Japan) Haruchika Aoki | FCC TSR | TSR-Honda | 17 | Retirement | 13 | |
| Ret | 24 | (Australia) Garry McCoy | Red Bull Yamaha WCM | Yamaha | 15 | Accident | 15 | |
| Ret | 22 | (France) Sébastien Gimbert | Tecmas Honda Elf | Honda | 13 | Retirement | 19 | |
| Ret | 17 | (Netherlands) Jurgen vd Goorbergh | Team Biland GP1 | MuZ Weber | 10 | Retirement | 16 | |
| Ret | 25 | (Spain) José Luis Cardoso | Team Maxon TSR | TSR-Honda | 7 | Retirement | 17 | |
| Ret | 9 | (Japan) Nobuatsu Aoki | Suzuki Grand Prix Team | Suzuki | 2 | Retirement | 11 | |
| Ret | 69 | (United Kingdom) Jamie Whitham | Proton KR Modenas | Modenas KR3 | 1 | Accident | 14 | |
| Ret | 19 | (Germany) Markus Ober | Dee Cee Jeans Racing Team | Honda | 1 | Accident | 22 | |
| Ret | 4 | (Spain) Carlos Checa | Marlboro Yamaha Team | Yamaha | 1 | Retirement | 12 | |
| DNS | 15 | (Spain) Sete Gibernau | Repsol Honda Team | Honda | | Did not start | | |

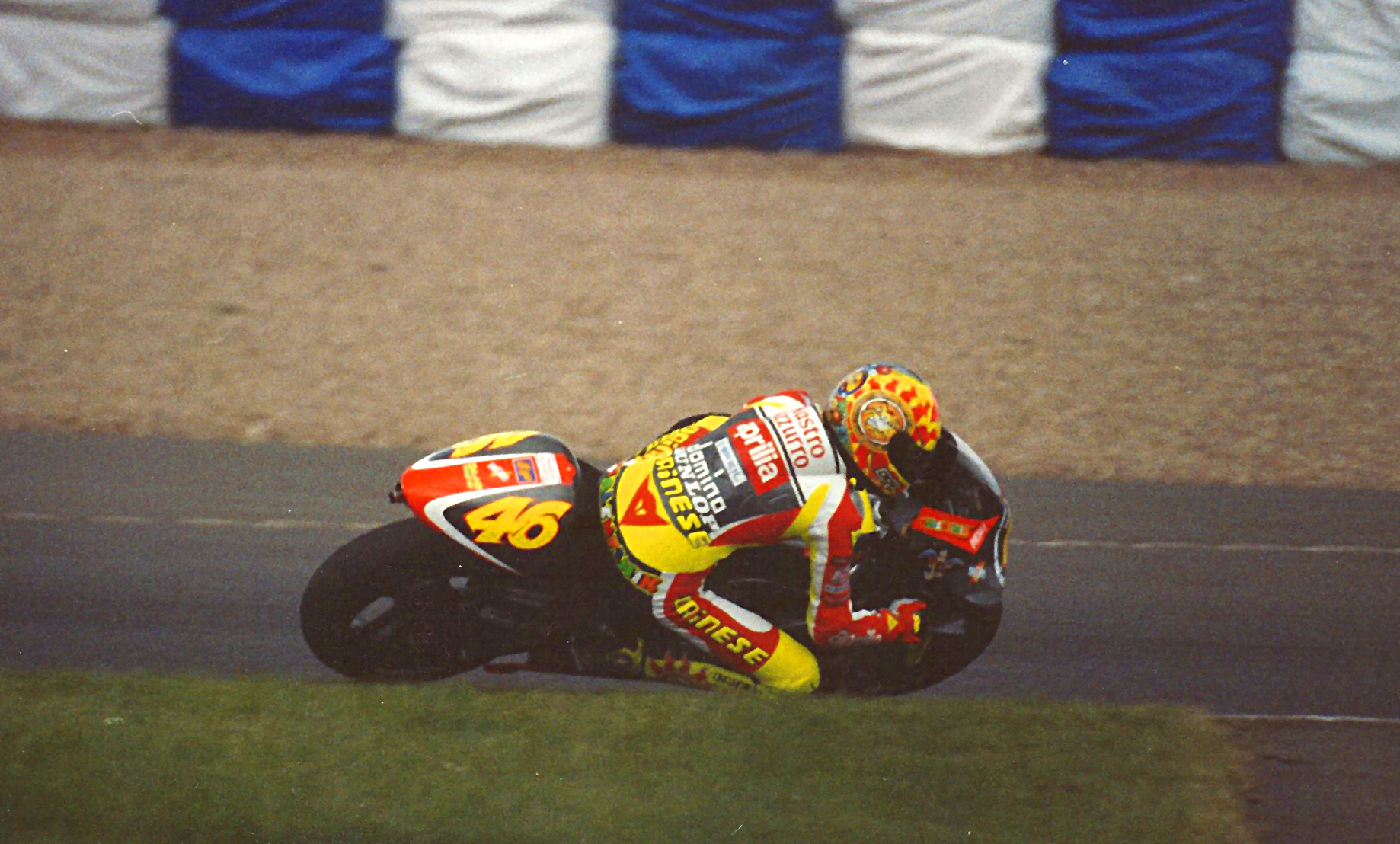
Valentino Rossi, riding his Aprilia during the 250cc race, which went on to win.

== 250 cc classification ==
| Pos. | No. | Rider | Manufacturer | Laps | Time/Retired | Grid | Points |
|---|---|---|---|---|---|---|---|
| 1 | 46 | (Italy) Valentino Rossi | Aprilia | 27 | 42:54.311 | 3 | 25 |
| 2 | 1 | (Italy) Loris Capirossi | Honda | 27 | +1.261 | 1 | 20 |
| 3 | 56 | (Japan) Shinya Nakano | Yamaha | 27 | +8.162 | 6 | 16 |
| 4 | 4 | (Japan) Tohru Ukawa | Honda | 27 | +9.000 | 4 | 13 |
| 5 | 7 | (Italy) Stefano Perugini | Honda | 27 | +14.131 | 9 | 11 |
| 6 | 9 | (United Kingdom) Jeremy McWilliams | Aprilia | 27 | +17.368 | 8 | 10 |
| 7 | 34 | (Italy) Marcellino Lucchi | Aprilia | 27 | +23.720 | 5 | 9 |
| 8 | 6 | (Germany) Ralf Waldmann | Aprilia | 27 | +25.636 | 2 | 8 |
| 9 | 36 | (Japan) Masaki Tokudome | TSR-Honda | 27 | +46.825 | 11 | 7 |
| 10 | 37 | (Italy) Luca Boscoscuro | TSR-Honda | 27 | +48.712 | 14 | 6 |
| 11 | 14 | (Australia) Anthony West | TSR-Honda | 27 | +52.790 | 13 | 5 |
| 12 | 77 | (United Kingdom) Jamie Robinson | Yamaha | 27 | +53.854 | 17 | 4 |
| 13 | 66 | (Germany) Alex Hofmann | TSR-Honda | 27 | +1:01.522 | 18 | 3 |
| 14 | 11 | (Japan) Tomomi Manako | Yamaha | 27 | +1:03.660 | 12 | 2 |
| 15 | 23 | (France) Julien Allemand | TSR-Honda | 27 | +1:14.867 | 16 | 1 |
| 16 | 15 | (Spain) David García | Yamaha | 27 | +1:30.127 | 22 | |
| 17 | 10 | (Spain) Fonsi Nieto | Yamaha | 27 | +1:31.582 | 21 | |
| 18 | 16 | (Sweden) Johan Stigefelt | Yamaha | 27 | +1:57.072 | 20 | |
| 19 | 41 | (Netherlands) Jarno Janssen | TSR-Honda | 27 | +2:07.055 | 26 | |
| Ret | 21 | (Italy) Franco Battaini | Aprilia | 24 | Retirement | 7 | |
| Ret | 17 | (Netherlands) Maurice Bolwerk | TSR-Honda | 20 | Accident | 23 | |
| Ret | 58 | (Argentina) Matías Ríos | Aprilia | 18 | Retirement | 28 | |
| Ret | 12 | (Argentina) Sebastián Porto | Yamaha | 11 | Accident | 15 | |
| Ret | 24 | (United Kingdom) Jason Vincent | Honda | 11 | Accident | 10 | |
| Ret | 79 | (South Africa) Shane Norval | Honda | 9 | Retirement | 19 | |
| Ret | 78 | (United Kingdom) Paul Jones | Honda | 9 | Retirement | 25 | |
| Ret | 80 | (United Kingdom) Adrian Coates | Honda | 9 | Retirement | 24 | |
| Ret | 22 | (Spain) Lucas Oliver Bultó | Yamaha | 1 | Retirement | 27 | |

== 125 cc classification ==
| Pos. | No. | Rider | Manufacturer | Laps | Time/Retired | Grid | Points |
|---|---|---|---|---|---|---|---|
| 1 | 4 | (Japan) Masao Azuma | Honda | 26 | 43:21.690 | 7 | 25 |
| 2 | 6 | (Japan) Noboru Ueda | Honda | 26 | +1.783 | 8 | 20 |
| 3 | 7 | (Spain) Emilio Alzamora | Honda | 26 | +2.010 | 2 | 16 |
| 4 | 15 | (Italy) Roberto Locatelli | Aprilia | 26 | +2.380 | 5 | 13 |
| 5 | 13 | (Italy) Marco Melandri | Honda | 26 | +10.516 | 6 | 11 |
| 6 | 8 | (Italy) Gianluigi Scalvini | Aprilia | 26 | +10.615 | 1 | 10 |
| 7 | 41 | (Japan) Youichi Ui | Derbi | 26 | +11.195 | 3 | 9 |
| 8 | 23 | (Italy) Gino Borsoi | Aprilia | 26 | +20.969 | 10 | 8 |
| 9 | 21 | (France) Arnaud Vincent | Aprilia | 26 | +27.809 | 4 | 7 |
| 10 | 32 | (Italy) Mirko Giansanti | Aprilia | 26 | +32.981 | 13 | 6 |
| 11 | 26 | (Italy) Ivan Goi | Honda | 26 | +33.839 | 14 | 5 |
| 12 | 22 | (Spain) Pablo Nieto | Derbi | 26 | +34.250 | 24 | 4 |
| 13 | 1 | (Japan) Kazuto Sakata | Honda | 26 | +43.194 | 12 | 3 |
| 14 | 18 | (Germany) Reinhard Stolz | Honda | 26 | +44.396 | 17 | 2 |
| 15 | 10 | (Spain) Jerónimo Vidal | Aprilia | 26 | +46.529 | 15 | 1 |
| 16 | 44 | (Italy) Alessandro Brannetti | Aprilia | 26 | +1:11.284 | 22 | |
| 17 | 29 | (Spain) Ángel Nieto, Jr. | Honda | 26 | +1:11.774 | 23 | |
| 18 | 11 | (Italy) Max Sabbatani | Honda | 26 | +1:16.580 | 19 | |
| 19 | 72 | (United Kingdom) Leon Haslam | Honda | 25 | +1 lap | 25 | |
| 20 | 75 | (United Kingdom) Kenny Tibble | Honda | 25 | +1 lap | 28 | |
| Ret | 5 | (Italy) Lucio Cecchinello | Honda | 17 | Accident | 11 | |
| Ret | 74 | (United Kingdom) Chris Burns | Honda | 17 | Retirement | 26 | |
| Ret | 9 | (France) Frédéric Petit | Aprilia | 11 | Accident | 18 | |
| Ret | 73 | (United Kingdom) Andi Notman | Honda | 11 | Retirement | 27 | |
| Ret | 12 | (France) Randy de Puniet | Aprilia | 9 | Accident | 16 | |
| Ret | 16 | (Italy) Simone Sanna | Honda | 2 | Accident | 9 | |
| Ret | 54 | (San Marino) Manuel Poggiali | Aprilia | 1 | Accident | 21 | |
| Ret | 20 | (Germany) Bernhard Absmeier | Aprilia | 1 | Accident | 20 | |
| DNS | 17 | (Germany) Steve Jenkner | Aprilia | | Did not start | | |

== Championship standings after the race (500cc) ==
Below are the standings for the top five riders and constructors after round eight has concluded.

Riders' Championship standings

| Pos. | Rider | Points |
|---|---|---|
| 1 | (Spain) Àlex Crivillé | 154 |
| 2 | (Japan) Tadayuki Okada | 113 |
| 3 | (United States) Kenny Roberts Jr. | 102 |
| 4 | (Spain) Sete Gibernau | 88 |
| 5 | (Italy) Max Biaggi | 71 |

Constructors' Championship standings

| Pos. | Constructor | Points |
|---|---|---|
| 1 | (Japan) Honda | 186 |
| 2 | (Japan) Yamaha | 120 |
| 3 | (Japan) Suzuki | 102 |
| 4 | (Italy) Aprilia | 66 |
| 5 | (Germany) MuZ Weber | 34 |

- Note: Only the top five positions are included for both sets of standings.

| Previous race: 1999 Dutch TT | FIM Grand Prix World Championship; 1999 season | Next race: 1999 German Grand Prix |
| Previous race: 1998 British Grand Prix | British Grand Prix | Next race: 2000 British Grand Prix |
