= Dieter Stappert =

Austrian sports journalist and manager (1942–2008)

Dieter Stappert (October 13, 1942 – October 17, 2008) was an Austrian journalist and team manager in motorsport.

== Motorsport career ==
Stappert was born in Villach, Austria. By 1977 he was the editor-in-chief of the Swiss magazine Powerslide, now known as Motorsport Aktuell.

From 1977 to 1985 he worked at the BMW Motorsport and one of his first programme was the touring car BMW Junior Team which promoted Eddie Cheever, Manfred Winkelhock and Marc Surer through the ranks.

In 1980 Stappert took the role of Sporting Director and became responsible for BMW F1 programme, resulting in Nelson Piquet winning the 1983 F1 World Championship with the BMW-powered Brabham.

In 1986 Stappert became the motorsport manager for HB tobacco brand, acting also as team manager of the 250cc world championship motorcycle racing team. He created a highly competitive team signing former Anton Mang's mechanic Franz-Josef "Sepp" Schlögl as technical director and starting a long-term relationship with Honda Racing Corporation to receive factory-spec NSR250s. Over the years the HB team won many races with riders like Reinhold Roth, Helmut Bradl and Ralf Waldmann but never achieved the world title, finishing as runner-up four times (1987, 1989, 1991 and 1996).

After the withdrawal of HB from motorcycle road racing, Stappert established his own racing team in 1997 with Marlboro sponsorship and a factory Honda NSR250 for Ralf Waldmann who finished again second in championship. In 1998 the team received Castrol sponsorship and entered a NSR250 for Stefano Perugini with poor results.

Since 1999 to 2005 the team raced with Aprilia motorcycles and was known as Aprilia Germany. During this period the most notable riders were Ralf Waldmann, Jeremy McWilliams and Chaz Davies.

In 2006 Stappert managed the KTM Junior Team in the 125cc class with Stefan Bradl as rider.

Stappert died in a hospital in Munich on October 17, 2008 having never recovered full consciousness since a heart attack in June.
