= 1999 Grand Prix motorcycle racing season =

Sports season

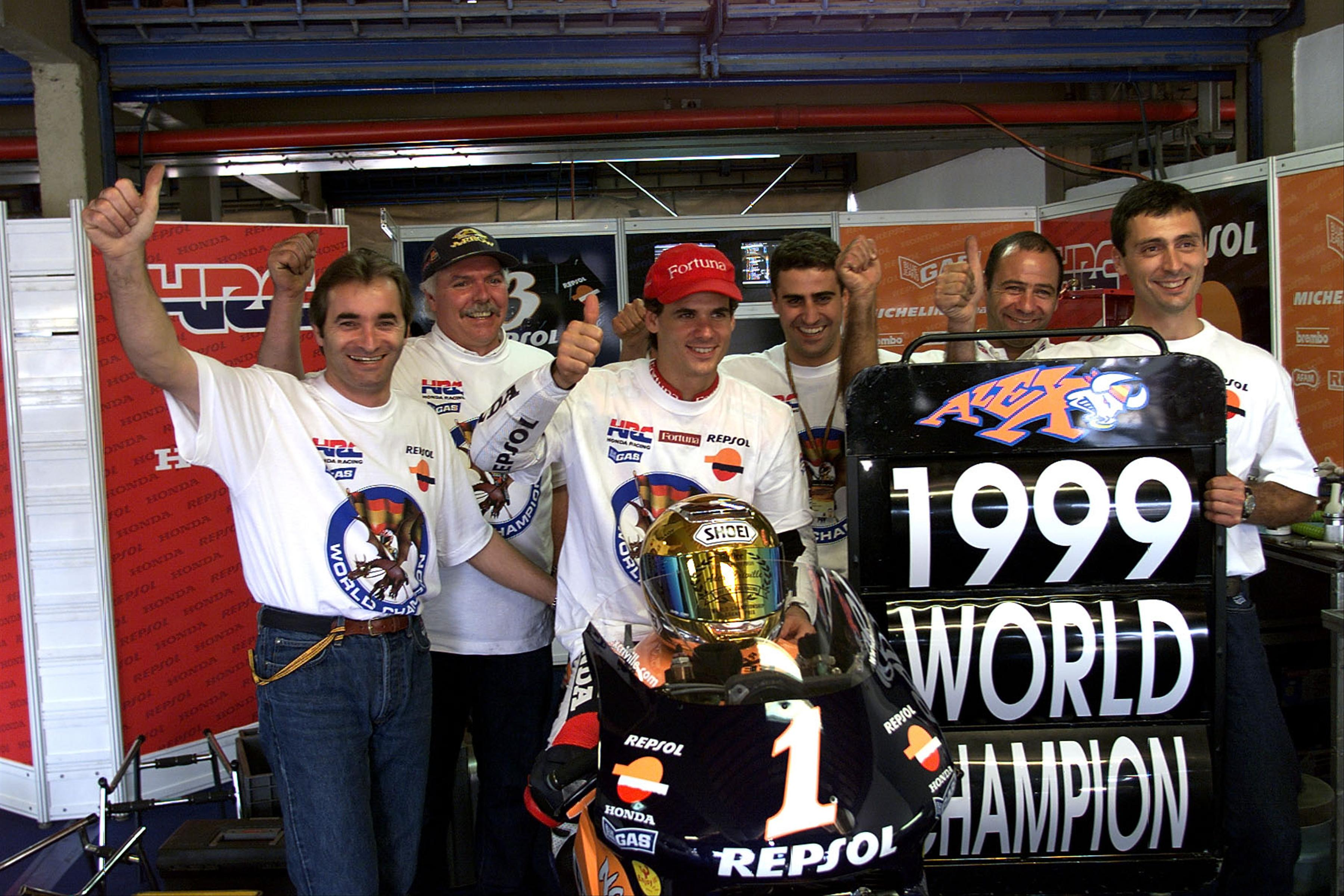
Àlex Crivillé (pictured at Rio de Janeiro) became the 500cc champion

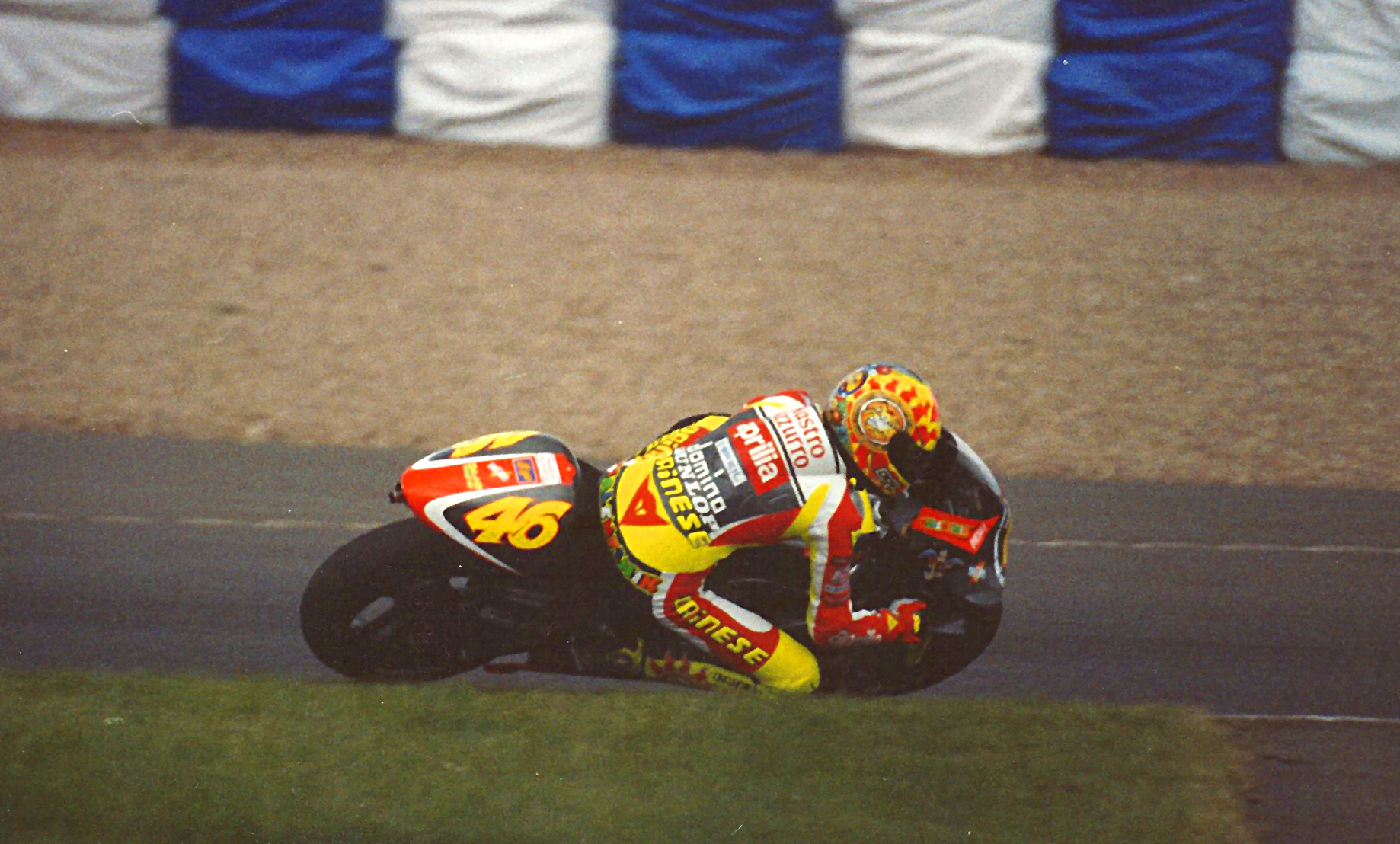
Valentino Rossi (pictured at Donington Park) became the 250cc champion

The 1999 Grand Prix motorcycle racing season was the 51st F.I.M. Road Racing World Championship season.

== Season summary ==
The dominant reign of Honda's Mick Doohan came to an end with serious injuries suffered in practice for the Spanish Grand Prix. In his absence, his Honda teammate Àlex Crivillé stepped forward and claimed Spain's first-ever 500cc world championship. Kenny Roberts Jr. gave a strong performance to finish in second with four victories including an outright victory over Doohan in Japan.

A young Valentino Rossi continued to impress for Aprilia, winning nine races and claiming his second world championship, this time in the 250 class. Honda's Emilio Alzamora became only the second rider to win a world championship without winning a race when he captured the 125 crown from Marco Melandri and Masao Azuma who split five victories between them.

== 1999 Grand Prix season calendar ==
The following Grands Prix were scheduled to take place in 1999:

Round	Date	Grand Prix	Circuit
1	18 April	(Malaysia) Marlboro Malaysian Grand Prix	Sepang International Circuit
2	25 April	(Japan) Marlboro Japanese Grand Prix	Twin Ring Motegi
3	9 May	(Spain) Gran Premio Marlboro de España	Circuito de Jerez
4	23 May	Grand Prix de France	Circuit Paul Ricard
5	6 June	(Italy) Gran Premio d'Italia IP	Mugello Circuit
6	20 June	(Catalonia) Gran Premi Marlboro de Catalunya	Circuit de Catalunya
7	26 June ††	(Netherlands) Rizla Dutch TT	TT Circuit Assen
8	4 July	(United Kingdom) British Grand Prix	Donington Park
9	18 July	(Germany) Polini Motorrad Grand Prix Deutschland	Sachsenring
10	22 August	(Czech Republic) Grand Prix České Republiky	Brno Circuit
11	5 September	(Bologna) Gran Premio Breil Città di Imola	Autodromo Enzo e Dino Ferrari
12	19 September	(Valencian Community) Gran Premio Movistar de la Comunitat Valenciana	Circuit Ricardo Tormo
13	3 October	(Australia) Qantas Australian Grand Prix	Phillip Island Grand Prix Circuit
14	10 October	(South Africa) South African Grand Prix	Phakisa Freeway
15	24 October	(Rio de Janeiro (state)) Telefônica Celular Rio Grand Prix	Autódromo Internacional Nelson Piquet
16	31 October	Gran Premio Marlboro de Argentina	Autódromo Oscar Alfredo Gálvez

†† = Saturday race

=== Calendar changes ===
- The Japanese Grand Prix and Malaysian Grand Prix swapped places, with Malaysia hosting the opening round Grand Prix, instead of Japan.
- The Malaysian Grand Prix was moved from Johor to the newly built Sepang International Circuit.
- The Madrid Grand Prix was taken off the calendar, in favour of the newly built Circuit Ricardo Tormo, which would host the first Valencian Grand Prix this year.
- Both the South African Grand Prix and Rio de Janeiro Grand Prix were added to the calendar. The Rio Grand Prix was removed last year due to organisational problems, whilst South Africa had not been in the calendar since 1992. The race back then, was held at Kyalami.
- The Japanese motorcycle Grand Prix moved from Suzuka Circuit to the new Twin Ring Motegi circuit.

== 1999 Grand Prix season results ==
Round	Date	Race	Location	125cc winner	250cc winner	500cc winner	Report
1	18 April	(Malaysia) Malaysian motorcycle Grand Prix	Sepang	(Japan) Masao Azuma	(Italy) Loris Capirossi	(United States) Kenny Roberts Jr.	Report
2	25 April	(Japan) Japanese motorcycle Grand Prix	Motegi	(Japan) Masao Azuma	(Japan) Shinya Nakano	(United States) Kenny Roberts Jr.	Report
3	9 May	(Spain) Spanish motorcycle Grand Prix	Jerez	(Japan) Masao Azuma	(Italy) Valentino Rossi	(Spain) Àlex Crivillé	Report
4	23 May	(France) French motorcycle Grand Prix	Paul Ricard	(Italy) Roberto Locatelli	(Japan) Tohru Ukawa	(Spain) Àlex Crivillé	Report
5	6 June	(Italy) Italian motorcycle Grand Prix	Mugello	(Italy) Roberto Locatelli	(Italy) Valentino Rossi	(Spain) Àlex Crivillé	Report
6	20 June	(Catalonia) Catalan motorcycle Grand Prix	Catalunya	(France) Arnaud Vincent	(Italy) Valentino Rossi	(Spain) Àlex Crivillé	Report
7	26 June ††	(Netherlands) Dutch TT	Assen	(Japan) Masao Azuma	(Italy) Loris Capirossi	(Japan) Tadayuki Okada	Report
8	4 July	(United Kingdom) British motorcycle Grand Prix	Donington	(Japan) Masao Azuma	(Italy) Valentino Rossi	(Spain) Àlex Crivillé	Report
9	18 July	(Germany) German motorcycle Grand Prix	Sachsenring	(Italy) Marco Melandri	(Italy) Valentino Rossi	(United States) Kenny Roberts Jr.	Report
10	22 August	Czech Republic motorcycle Grand Prix	Brno	(Italy) Marco Melandri	(Italy) Valentino Rossi	(Japan) Tadayuki Okada	Report
11	5 September	(Bologna) City of Imola motorcycle Grand Prix	Imola	(Italy) Marco Melandri	(Italy) Loris Capirossi	(Spain) Àlex Crivillé	Report
12	19 September	Valencian Community motorcycle Grand Prix	Valencia	(Italy) Gianluigi Scalvini	(Japan) Tohru Ukawa	(France) Régis Laconi	Report
13	3 October	(Australia) Australian motorcycle Grand Prix	Phillip Island	(Italy) Marco Melandri	(Italy) Valentino Rossi	(Japan) Tadayuki Okada	Report
14	10 October	(South Africa) South African motorcycle Grand Prix	Welkom	(Italy) Gianluigi Scalvini	(Italy) Valentino Rossi	(Italy) Max Biaggi	Report
15	24 October	(Rio de Janeiro (state)) Rio de Janeiro motorcycle Grand Prix	Rio de Janeiro	(Japan) Noboru Ueda	(Italy) Valentino Rossi	(Japan) Norifumi Abe	Report
16	31 October	(Argentina) Argentine motorcycle Grand Prix	Buenos Aires	(Italy) Marco Melandri	(France) Olivier Jacque	(United States) Kenny Roberts Jr.	Report

†† = Saturday race

== Participants ==
=== 500cc participants ===
Team	Constructor	Motorcycle	No	Rider	Rounds
(Spain) MoviStar Honda Pons	Honda	Honda NSR500	5	(Brazil) Alex Barros	All
(Spain) MoviStar Honda Pons	Honda	Honda NSR500	14	(Spain) Juan Borja	All
(Japan) Kanemoto Honda	Honda	Honda NSR500	19	(United States) John Kocinski	All
(Japan) Lucky Strike Honda Racing	Honda	Honda NSR500	36	(Japan) Shinichi Ito	2
(Japan) Repsol Honda Team	Honda	Honda NSR500	1	(Australia) Mick Doohan	1–3
(Japan) Repsol Honda Team	Honda	Honda NSR500	3	(Spain) Àlex Crivillé	All
(Japan) Repsol Honda Team	Honda	Honda NSR500	8	(Japan) Tadayuki Okada	All
(Japan) Repsol Honda Team	Honda	Honda NSR500	15	(Spain) Sete Gibernau	6–16
(Japan) Repsol Honda Team	Honda	Honda NSR500V	15	(Spain) Sete Gibernau	1–5
(Netherlands) Dee Cee Jeans Racing Team	Honda	Honda NSR500V	18	(Germany) Markus Ober	1–9
(Netherlands) Dee Cee Jeans Racing Team	Honda	Honda NSR500V	32	(France) Marc Garcia	12
(Netherlands) Dee Cee Jeans Racing Team	Honda	Honda NSR500V	37	(Australia) Steve Martin	13–16
(Netherlands) Dee Cee Jeans Racing Team	Honda	Honda NSR500V	52	(Spain) José David de Gea	10–11
(United Kingdom) Millar Honda	Honda	Honda NSR500V	21	(United Kingdom) Michael Rutter	All
(France) Tecmas Honda Elf	Honda	Honda NSR500V	22	(France) Sébastien Gimbert	All
Raceline Malaysia	Honda	Honda NSR500V	45	(Australia) John Allen	1
(United Kingdom) Team Vimto Honda	Honda	Honda NSR500V	46	(United Kingdom) John McGuinness	8
(Japan) Marlboro Yamaha Team	Yamaha	Yamaha YZR500 (OWK1)	2	(Italy) Max Biaggi	All
(Japan) Marlboro Yamaha Team	Yamaha	Yamaha YZR500 (OWK1)	4	(Spain) Carlos Checa	All
(Spain) Antena 3 Yamaha d'Antin	Yamaha	Yamaha YZR500 (OWK1)	6	(Japan) Norick Abe	All
(United Kingdom) Red Bull Yamaha WCM	Yamaha	Yamaha YZR500 (OWK1)	11	(New Zealand) Simon Crafar	1–6
(United Kingdom) Red Bull Yamaha WCM	Yamaha	Yamaha YZR500 (OWK1)	24	(Australia) Garry McCoy	7–16
(United Kingdom) Red Bull Yamaha WCM	Yamaha	Yamaha YZR500 (OWK1)	55	(France) Régis Laconi	All
(Germany) / (Switzerland) Team Biland GP1	MuZ Weber	MuZ Weber 500	7	(Italy) Luca Cadalora	1, 3–7, 9–10
(Germany) / (Switzerland) Team Biland GP1	MuZ Weber	MuZ Weber 500	11	(New Zealand) Simon Crafar	8
(Germany) / (Switzerland) Team Biland GP1	MuZ Weber	MuZ Weber 500	17	(Netherlands) Jurgen van den Goorbergh	All
(Germany) / (Switzerland) Team Biland GP1	MuZ Weber	MuZ Weber 500	27	(France) Bernard Garcia	11–12
(Germany) / (Switzerland) Team Biland GP1	MuZ Weber	MuZ Weber 500	35	(Australia) Anthony Gobert	13–16
(Germany) / (Switzerland) Team Biland GP1	MuZ Weber	MuZ Weber 500	71	(Japan) Noriyasu Numata	2
(Japan) Suzuki Grand Prix Team	Suzuki	Suzuki RGV500 (XR89)	9	(Japan) Nobuatsu Aoki	1–3, 6–16
(Japan) Suzuki Grand Prix Team	Suzuki	Suzuki RGV500 (XR89)	10	(United States) Kenny Roberts Jr.	All
(Japan) Suzuki Grand Prix Team	Suzuki	Suzuki RGV500 (XR89)	16	(Japan) Yukio Kagayama	1–2
(Japan) Suzuki Grand Prix Team	Suzuki	Suzuki RGV500 (XR89)	16	(Japan) Yukio Kagayama	4
(New Zealand) Buckley Systems BSL Racing	BSL	BSL 500 V3	68	(Australia) Mark Willis	1, 3–5
(New Zealand) Buckley Systems BSL Racing	Modenas KR3	Modenas KR3	68	(Australia) Mark Willis	10–16
(Malaysia) / (United States) Proton KR Modenas	Modenas KR3	Modenas KR3	12	(France) Jean-Michel Bayle	1–2, 4–6
(Malaysia) / (United States) Proton KR Modenas	Modenas KR3	Modenas KR3	20	(United States) Mike Hale	1–4, 10–16
(Malaysia) / (United States) Proton KR Modenas	Modenas KR3	Modenas KR3	52	(Spain) José David de Gea	12–16
(Malaysia) / (United States) Proton KR Modenas	Modenas KR3	Modenas KR3	68	(Australia) Mark Willis	7, 9
(Malaysia) / (United States) Proton KR Modenas	Modenas KR3	Modenas KR3	69	(United Kingdom) Jamie Whitham	3, 5–10
(Spain) Technical Maxon TSR	TSR-Honda	TSR-Honda AC50M	25	(Spain) José Luis Cardoso	1–8, 10–16
(Spain) Technical Maxon TSR	TSR-Honda	TSR-Honda AC50M	52	(Spain) José David de Gea	9
(Japan) F.C.C. TSR	TSR-Honda	TSR-Honda AC50M	26	(Japan) Haruchika Aoki	All
(Italy) Aprilia Grand Prix Racing	Aprilia	Aprilia RSW-2 500	31	(Japan) Tetsuya Harada	All
(Italy) Team Paton	Paton	Paton V70 C10/5	43	(Italy) Paolo Tessari	5–6

Key
Regular Rider
Wildcard Rider
Replacement Rider

=== 250cc participants ===
Team	Constructor	Motorcycle	No	Rider	Rounds
(Italy) Elf Axo Honda Gresini	Honda	Honda NSR250	1	(Italy) Loris Capirossi	1–5, 7–16
(Australia) Shell Advance Honda Team	Honda	Honda NSR250	4	(Japan) Tohru Ukawa	All
(Australia) Shell Advance Honda Team	Honda	Honda NSR250	40	(Australia) Jay Taylor	13
(Australia) Shell Advance Honda Team	TSR-Honda	Honda NSR250	14	(Australia) Anthony West	All
Aprilia Germany	Aprilia	Aprilia RSV 250	6	(Germany) Ralf Waldmann	1, 3–16
(Italy) Fila Watches Honda	Honda	Honda NSR250	7	(Italy) Stefano Perugini	All
(United Kingdom) QUB Team Optimum	Aprilia	Aprilia RSV 250	9	(United Kingdom) Jeremy McWilliams	1–13, 15–16
(United Kingdom) QUB Team Optimum	Aprilia	Aprilia RSV 250	80	(United Kingdom) Adrian Coates	14
(Spain) Antena 3 Yamaha–D'Antin	Yamaha	Yamaha YZR 250	10	(Spain) Fonsi Nieto	All
(Spain) Antena 3 Yamaha–D'Antin	Yamaha	Yamaha YZR 250	15	(Spain) David García	All
(Germany) Yamaha Kurz Aral	Yamaha	Yamaha YZR 250	11	(Japan) Tomomi Manako	All
(Germany) Yamaha Kurz Aral	Yamaha	Yamaha YZR 250	22	(Spain) Lucas Oliver	1–4, 6–13
(Germany) Yamaha Kurz Aral	Yamaha	Yamaha YZR 250	32	(Germany) Markus Barth	14–16
(Germany) Yamaha Kurz Aral	Yamaha	Yamaha YZR 250	55	(Italy) Filippo Cotti	5
(Italy) Semprucci Biesse–Group	Yamaha	Yamaha YZR 250	12	(Argentina) Sebastián Porto	All
(Germany) Edo Racing	Yamaha	Yamaha YZR 250	16	(Sweden) Johan Stigefelt	All
(Germany) Edo Racing	Yamaha	Yamaha YZR 250	47	(Italy) Ivan Mengozzi	5
(Netherlands) Team Rizla Honda	Honda	Honda NSR250	27	(Netherlands) Rob Filart	4–5
(Netherlands) Team Rizla Honda	TSR-Honda	Honda NSR250	17	(Netherlands) Maurice Bolwerk	1, 7–16
(Netherlands) Team Rizla Honda	TSR-Honda	Honda NSR250	28	(Japan) Naohiro Negishi	3
(Netherlands) Team Rizla Honda	TSR-Honda	Honda NSR250	41	(Netherlands) Jarno Janssen	All
(Netherlands) Team Rizla Honda	TSR-Honda	Honda NSR250	71	(Japan) Takehiko Kurokawa	2
(France) Chesterfield Yamaha Tech 3	Yamaha	Yamaha YZR 250	19	(France) Olivier Jacque	1–3, 9–16
(France) Chesterfield Yamaha Tech 3	Yamaha	Yamaha YZR 250	31	(Japan) Toshihiko Honma	4–5
(France) Chesterfield Yamaha Tech 3	Yamaha	Yamaha YZR 250	49	(Japan) Naoki Matsudo	6–7
(France) Chesterfield Yamaha Tech 3	Yamaha	Yamaha YZR 250	56	(Japan) Shinya Nakano	All
(France) Chesterfield Yamaha Tech 3	Yamaha	Yamaha YZR 250	77	(United Kingdom) Jamie Robinson	8
(Italy) FGF Battaini Racing	Aprilia	Aprilia RSV 250	21	(Italy) Franco Battaini	All
(France) Tecmas Honda Elf	TSR-Honda	Honda NSR250	23	(France) Julien Allemand	All
(United Kingdom) Padgetts HRC Shop	Honda	Honda NSR250	24	(United Kingdom) Jason Vincent	All
(Germany) Docshop Racing	Aprilia	Aprilia RSV 250	18	(United Kingdom) Scott Smart	10–16
(Germany) Docshop Racing	Aprilia	Aprilia RSV 250	34	(Italy) Marcellino Lucchi	1–9
(Germany) Docshop Racing	Aprilia	Aprilia RSV 250	85	(Germany) Matthias Neukirchen	9
(Italy) Future Strategies	Aprilia	Aprilia RSV 250	35	(Italy) Mario De Matteo	11
(Netherlands) Dee Cee Jeans Racing Team	TSR-Honda	Honda NSR250	36	(Japan) Masaki Tokudome	All
(Italy) Polini	TSR-Honda	Honda NSR250	37	(Italy) Luca Boscoscuro	All
(Australia) RGV Spares	Yamaha	Yamaha YZR 250	38	(Australia) Shaun Geronimi	13
(Australia) Casino Canberra	Yamaha	Yamaha YZR 250	39	(Australia) Roger Harrison	13
(Australia) Hjc/Aral Lubricants	Honda	Honda NSR250	42	(Australia) Aaron Clark	13
(Australia) Aluma-Lite Racing	Honda	Honda NSR250	43	(Australia) Kevin Curtain	13
(Italy) Vasco Rossi Racing	Aprilia	Aprilia RSV 250	44	(Italy) Roberto Rolfo	1–7, 9–13, 15–16
(Italy) Aprilia Grand Prix Racing	Aprilia	Aprilia RSV 250	34	(Italy) Marcellino Lucchi	11
(Italy) Aprilia Grand Prix Racing	Aprilia	Aprilia RSV 250	46	(Italy) Valentino Rossi	All
(Italy) Team Campetella	Aprilia	Aprilia RSV 250	48	(Italy) Ivan Clementi	5, 11
(Japan) BP Yamaha Racing Team	Yamaha	Yamaha YZR 250	49	(Japan) Naoki Matsudo	1–2
(Japan) Hitman RC Koshien Yamaha	Yamaha	Yamaha YZR 250	50	(Japan) Taro Sekiguchi	2
(Japan) Castrol Honda	Honda	Honda NSR250	51	(Japan) Daijiro Kato	2
(Japan) Castrol Team Harc Pro	Honda	Honda NSR250	52	(Japan) Tatsuya Yamaguchi	2
(Japan) SP Tadao Racing Team	Yamaha	Yamaha YZR 250	53	(Japan) Ken Eguchi	2
(Japan) F.C.C. TSR	TSR-Honda	Honda NSR250	54	(Japan) Tekkyu Kayo	2
(Spain) Chupa Chups Team	Honda	Honda NSR250	57	(Spain) Ismael Bonilla	12
(Spain) Chupa Chups Team	Honda	Honda NSR250	60	(Spain) Alex Debón	3, 6, 12
(Spain) PR2 Mitsubishi	Aprilia	Aprilia RSV 250	58	(Argentina) Matías Ríos	All
(Spain) KR Sport Team	Honda	Honda NSR250	59	(Spain) Jesús Pérez	3, 6
(Malaysia) Petronas Sprinta Team	Honda	Honda NSR250	61	(Malaysia) Kuang Meng Heng	1
(Malaysia) Petronas Sprinta Team	Honda	Honda NSR250	63	(Malaysia) Shahrol Yuzy	1, 3
(Spain) Fast Racing; Echo Team C.C. Neptuno; Echo Team Neuauto – BMW	Honda	Honda NSR250	62	(Spain) Álvaro Molina	3, 6, 12
(Spain) M3 Competicion	Yamaha	Yamaha YZR 250	64	(Spain) Manuel Luque	3
Equipe de France	Honda	Honda NSR250	65	(France) Julien Da Costa	4
Equipe de France	Honda	Honda NSR250	68	(France) Vincent Philippe	4
(Germany) Racing Factory	TSR-Honda	Honda NSR250	66	(Germany) Alex Hofmann	All
(France) Styl Moto Racing Team	Honda	Honda NSR250	67	(France) Thomas Metro	4
(Spain) Promoto Sport	Honda	Honda NSR250	69	(Spain) Daniel Ribalta	6, 12
(Spain) Motorola	Honda	Honda NSR250	70	(Spain) Iván Silva	6
(Netherlands) Johan Jong Brandbom Racing Team	Aprilia	Aprilia RSV 250	72	(Netherlands) Rudie Markink	7
(Netherlands) AV Racing Team	Aprilia	Aprilia RSV 250	73	(Netherlands) Arno Visscher	7, 10
(Netherlands) Frederikshof VHM Racing	Honda	Honda NSR250	74	(Netherlands) Andre Romein	7
(Netherlands) Schoenkaper oz Racing	Honda	Honda NSR250	75	(Netherlands) Henk van de Lagemaat	7
(Netherlands) Team Bouwman Consultancy	Honda	Honda NSR250	76	(Netherlands) Rein Ten Napel	7
(United Kingdom) Team Vimto Honda	Honda	Honda NSR250	78	(United Kingdom) Paul Jones	8
(United Kingdom) Help Hire Bike Assist/Phakisa	Honda	Honda NSR250	79	(South Africa) Shane Norval	8, 14
(United Kingdom) Toby Hurst Racing	Honda	Honda NSR250	80	(United Kingdom) Adrian Coates	8
(Germany) Team Kungels Baumaschinen	TSR-Honda	Honda NSR250	81	(Germany) Mike Baldinger	9
(Germany) Speed Unit	Honda	Honda NSR250	82	(Germany) Dirk Brockman	9
(Germany) Kiefer GmBH Racing	Honda	Honda NSR250	83	(Germany) Christian Gemmel	9
(Germany) Freudenberg Racing Team	Honda	Honda NSR250	84	(Germany) Dirk Heidolf	9
(Slovakia) Slovnaft-Sport Moto Team	Honda	Honda NSR250	86	(Slovakia) Vladimír Částka	10
(Czech Republic) Klub Racing Team Znojmo	Honda	Honda NSR250	87	(Czech Republic) Radomil Rous	10
(Czech Republic) Moto Racing Klub Ostrava	Honda	Honda NSR250	88	(Czech Republic) Lukáš Vavrečka	10
(Germany) Muller Maler Racing Team	Yamaha	Yamaha YZR 250	89	(Germany) Lars Langer	10
(Italy) RCGM	Aprilia	Aprilia RSV 250	90	(Italy) Stefano Pennese	11
(Spain) Costa de Azahar	TSR-Honda	Honda NSR250	91	(Spain) David Ortega	12
(France) Ferro Moto Sport	Aprilia	Aprilia RSV 250	93	(France) Hervé Mora	4
(Argentina) RC Competicion	Yamaha	Yamaha YZR 250	94	(Argentina) Gabriel Borgmann	16
(Argentina) Lozano Racing	Honda	Honda NSR250	95	(Argentina) Leandro Mulet	16
(Argentina) Honda Gregorio Racing	Honda	Honda NSR250	96	(Argentina) Diego Pierluigi	16
(Argentina) Roger Buffa Team Racing	Yamaha	Yamaha YZR 250	97	(Argentina) Roger Buffa	16
(Argentina) Daniel Rios Racing	Yamaha	Yamaha YZR 250	98	(Argentina) Leandro Giuggia	16

Key
Regular Rider
Wildcard Rider
Replacement Rider

=== 125cc participants ===
Team	Constructor	Motorcycle	No	Rider	Rounds
(Italy) M.T.P. – Team Pileri	Honda	Honda RS125R	1	(Japan) Kazuto Sakata	All
(Italy) Benetton Playlife Racing Team – Liegeois	Honda	Honda RS125R	4	(Japan) Masao Azuma	All
(Italy) Benetton Playlife Racing Team – Liegeois	Honda	Honda RS125R	13	(Italy) Marco Melandri	1, 3–16
(Monaco) Givi Honda LCR	Honda	Honda RS125R	5	(Italy) Lucio Cecchinello	All
(Monaco) Givi Honda LCR	Honda	Honda RS125R	6	(Japan) Noboru Ueda	All
(Spain) Via Digital Team	Honda	Honda RS125R	7	(Spain) Emilio Alzamora	All
(Spain) Via Digital Team	Honda	Honda RS125R	29	(Spain) Ángel Nieto Jr.	All
(Italy) Inoxmacel Fontana Racing	Aprilia	Aprilia RS125R	8	(Italy) Gianluigi Scalvini	All
(France) Racing Moto Sport	Aprilia	Aprilia RS125R	9	(France) Frédéric Petit	1–9, 11–16
(France) Racing Moto Sport	Honda	Honda RS125R	61	(France) Jimmy Petit	4
(Spain) C.C. Valencia; Valencia III Milenio	Aprilia	Aprilia RS125R	10	(Spain) Jerónimo Vidal	All
(Spain) C.C. Valencia; Valencia III Milenio	Aprilia	Aprilia RS125R	21	(France) Arnaud Vincent	All
(Spain) C.C. Valencia; Valencia III Milenio	Aprilia	Aprilia RS125R	85	(Spain) David Micó	12
(Italy) Matteoni Racing	Honda	Honda RS125R	11	(Italy) Max Sabbatani	1–6, 8–16
(Italy) Matteoni Racing	Honda	Honda RS125R	26	(Italy) Ivan Goi	All
(Italy) Matteoni Racing	Honda	Honda RS125R	36	(San Marino) Alex de Angelis	11
(Italy) Matteoni Racing	Honda	Honda RS125R	37	(San Marino) William de Angelis	11
(France) SCRAB Compétition	Aprilia	Aprilia RS125R	12	(France) Randy de Puniet	All
(Italy) Vasco Rossi Racing	Aprilia	Aprilia RS125R	15	(Italy) Roberto Locatelli	All
(Italy) Polini	Honda	Honda RS125R	16	(Italy) Simone Sanna	All
(Italy) Polini	Honda	Honda RS125R	18	(Germany) Reinhard Stolz	All
(Italy) Polini	Honda	Honda RS125R	55	(Spain) Toni Elías	12
(Italy) Polini	Honda	Honda RS125R	94	(South Africa) Levy Beaumont	14
(Germany) Marlboro Team ADAC	Aprilia	Aprilia RS125R	17	(Germany) Steve Jenkner	1–6, 8–16
(Germany) Mayer–Rubatto Racing	Aprilia	Aprilia RS125R	20	(Germany) Bernhard Absmeier	1–12
(Germany) Mayer–Rubatto Racing	Aprilia	Aprilia RS125R	24	(Denmark) Robbin Harms	13–16
(Spain) Festina Derbi	Derbi	Derbi 125 GP	22	(Spain) Pablo Nieto	All
(Spain) Festina Derbi	Derbi	Derbi 125 GP	41	(Japan) Youichi Ui	1–4, 6–16
(Italy) Semprucci Biesse–Group	Aprilia	Aprilia RS125R	23	(Italy) Gino Borsoi	All
(Italy) Kappa Racing Team	Aprilia	Aprilia RS125R	32	(Italy) Mirko Giansanti	All
(Italy) Kappa Racing Team	Aprilia	Aprilia RS125R	54	(San Marino) Manuel Poggiali	All
(Italy) Team Ciarom–Ducci	Aprilia	Aprilia RS125R	38	(Italy) Diego Giugovaz	11
(Italy) Team Ciarom–Ducci	Aprilia	Aprilia RS125R	64	(Italy) Gaspare Caffiero	5
(Italy) Team Sandroni	Aprilia	Aprilia RS125R	39	(Italy) Christian Magnani	11
(Spain) EDR Portotrans; T.M.R. Competición	Honda	Honda RS125R	43	(Spain) Víctor Carrasco	6
(Spain) EDR Portotrans; T.M.R. Competición	Honda	Honda RS125R	53	(Spain) Emilio Delgado	3, 6, 12
(Italy) Future Strategies	Aprilia	Aprilia RS125R	44	(Italy) Alessandro Brannetti	1–15
(Malaysia) Workline Motorsport	Honda	Honda RS125R	45	(Malaysia) Magilai Meganathan	1
(Thailand) Honda–Castrol	Honda	Honda RS125R	46	(Thailand) Direk Archewong	1
(Japan) Hitman RC Koshien Yamaha	Yamaha	Yamaha TZ125	47	(Japan) Kazuhiro Kubo	2
(Japan) JHA Racing	Honda	Honda RS125R	48	(Japan) Hideyuki Nakajo	2
(Japan) RT Tube Riders & Maziora	Honda	Honda RS125R	49	(Japan) Jun Inageda	2
(Japan) JT Racing Motul	Yamaha	Yamaha TZ125	50	(Japan) Katsuji Uezu	2
(Japan) C. Networks & Towns	Honda	Honda RS125R	51	(Japan) Minoru Nakamura	2
(France) Team GMS	Honda	Honda RS125R	52	(France) Mike Lougassi	4
(Spain) R.A.C.C.	Honda	Honda RS125R	55	(Spain) Toni Elías	3, 6
(Spain) Fast Racing by Queroseno	Honda	Honda RS125R	56	(Spain) Adrián Araujo	3, 6, 12
(Spain) Metrakit RACC	Honda	Honda RS125R	57	(Spain) Luis Costa	3, 6
(France) S.M.D.	Honda	Honda RS125R	58	(France) Eric Dubray	4
(France) Provence Moto Sport	Aprilia	Aprilia RS125R	59	(France) Grégory Lefort	4
(France) Dom Racing Team	Honda	Honda RS125R	60	(France) Hervé Louiset	4
(Italy) Team Italia	Aprilia	Aprilia RS125R	62	(Italy) Riccardo Chiarello	5
(Italy) Team Italia	Aprilia	Aprilia RS125R	63	(Italy) Marco Petrini	5
(Italy) Team Campetella	Aprilia	Aprilia RS125R	65	(Italy) Lorenzo Lanzi	5
(Italy) Bieffe Racing	Honda	Honda RS125R	66	(Switzerland) Marco Tresoldi	5
(Netherlands) Luvro Van Leeuwen Motortech	Honda	Honda RS125R	67	(Netherlands) Wilhelm van Leeuwen	7
(Netherlands) Ep Bos Electro Elburg	Honda	Honda RS125R	68	(Netherlands) Hans Koopman	7
(Netherlands) RTD Doodermans Dakdekkers	Honda	Honda RS125R	69	(Netherlands) Ronnie Timmer	7
(Netherlands) Gebben Toyota Ramaker	Honda	Honda RS125R	70	(Netherlands) Harold de Haan	7
(Netherlands) Roteg Racing	Honda	Honda RS125R	71	(Netherlands) Patrick Lakerveld	7
(United Kingdom) Honda Britain	Honda	Honda RS125R	72	(United Kingdom) Leon Haslam	8
(United Kingdom) Speedline–Nrg	Honda	Honda RS125R	73	(United Kingdom) Andi Notman	8
(United Kingdom) RCD Motorsport	Honda	Honda RS125R	74	(United Kingdom) Chris Burns	8
(United Kingdom) Rheos Helmets / Honda Britain	Honda	Honda RS125R	75	(United Kingdom) Kenny Tibble	8
(Germany) Grand IMT Racing	Honda	Honda RS125R	76	(Germany) Philipp Hafeneger	9
(Germany) ADAC Junior Team	Honda	Honda RS125R	77	(Germany) Jarno Müller	9
(Germany) Speed Unit	Honda	Honda RS125R	78	(Germany) Klaus Nöhles	9–10
(Germany) Docshop Racing	Aprilia	Aprilia RS125R	79	(Germany) Dirk Reißmann	9
(Germany) Motorrad BUS	Honda	Honda RS125R	80	(Germany) Maik Stief	9
(Italy) PRD Italjet	Italjet	Italjet F125	81	(Czech Republic) Jaroslav Huleš	10–11
(Czech Republic) Budweiser Budvar elit hanush	Honda	Honda RS125R	82	(Czech Republic) Jakub Smrž	10
(Czech Republic) Delta Uamk Racing	Honda	Honda RS125R	83	(Czech Republic) Michal Březina	10
(Czech Republic) AMK Ravena–Zs Brno	Honda	Honda RS125R	84	(Czech Republic) Igor Kaláb	10
(Spain) Hot Beatriz	Aprilia	Aprilia RS125R	86	(Spain) Iván Martínez	12
(Argentina) Pic Racing	Yamaha	Yamaha TZ125	87	(Argentina) Franco Lessio	16
(Australia) Scott Walker Racing	Honda	Honda RS125R	88	(Australia) Broc Parkes	13
(Australia) Teknic Motorcycle Clothing	Honda	Honda RS125R	89	(Australia) Peter Galvin	13
(Australia) Fairbairn Cranes Racing	Honda	Honda RS125R	90	(Australia) Andrew Willy	13
(Australia) Teniswood Racing	Honda	Honda RS125R	91	(Australia) Michael Teniswood	13
(Australia) Chris Gordon Racing	Honda	Honda RS125R	92	(Australia) Dennis Charlett	13
(South Africa) Robert Portman Racing	Honda	Honda RS125R	93	(South Africa) Robert Portman	14
(Brazil) Gota Daurada Racing	Honda	Honda RS125R	95	(Brazil) Renato Velludo	15
Team Honda Brazil	Honda	Honda RS125R	96	(Brazil) Cristiano Vieira	15
(Brazil) Honda Revista Moto	Honda	Honda RS125R	97	(Brazil) César Barros	15
(Brazil) Alemao Rodas Montanna	Honda	Honda RS125R	98	(Brazil) Alexander di Grandi	15
(Italy) / (United States) Polini / Alien Racing	Honda	Honda RS125R	99	(United States) Jason DiSalvo	15–16

Key
Regular Rider
Wildcard Rider
Replacement Rider

== Standings ==
=== Riders' standings ===
==== 500cc ====
Scoring system

Points were awarded to the top fifteen finishers. A rider had to finish the race to earn points.

Position	**1st**	**2nd**	**3rd**	**4th**	**5th**	**6th**	**7th**	**8th**	**9th**	**10th**	**11th**	**12th**	**13th**	**14th**	**15th**
Points	25	20	16	13	11	10	9	8	7	6	5	4	3	2	1

Pos	Rider	Bike	MAL (Malaysia)	JPN (Japan)	ESP (Spain)	FRA (France)	ITA (Italy)	CAT (Catalonia)	NED (Netherlands)	GBR (United Kingdom)	GER (Germany)	CZE (Czech Republic)	IMO (Bologna)	VAL (Valencian Community)	AUS (Australia)	RSA (South Africa)	RIO (Rio de Janeiro (state))	ARG (Argentina)	Pts
1	(Spain) Àlex Crivillé	Honda	3	4	**1**	1	1	1	Ret	1	2	2	**1**	Ret	5	3	6	5	267
2	(United States) Kenny Roberts Jr.	Suzuki	1	**1**	13	Ret	5	6	2	8	**1**	3	6	2	**10**	22	**3**	**1**	220
3	(Japan) Tadayuki Okada	Honda	5	15	4	9	3	2	**1**	**2**	Ret	1	4	4	1	**4**	7	Ret	211
4	(Italy) Max Biaggi	Yamaha	Ret	9	2	**Ret**	2	Ret	5	4	Ret	4	3	7	2	1	2	2	194
5	(Spain) Sete Gibernau	Honda	10	5	3	4	6	3	3	DNS	9	10	10	9	6	2	5	6	165
6	(Japan) Norifumi Abe	Yamaha	Ret	3	5	6	Ret	Ret	6	6	3	Ret	11	6	16	9	1	3	136
7	(Spain) Carlos Checa	Yamaha	2	6	10	5	7	7	Ret	Ret	4	Ret	Ret	5	4	6	Ret	4	125
8	(United States) John Kocinski	Honda	**Ret**	Ret	6	2	8	9	7	9	5	14	8	8	9	10	13	7	115
9	(Brazil) Alex Barros	Honda	6	8	Ret	10	Ret	Ret	10	5	8	7	2	10	Ret	11	4	8	110
10	(Japan) Tetsuya Harada	Aprilia	13	Ret	Ret	3	**4**	4	11	3	7	5	13	11	Ret	15	12	11	104
11	(France) Régis Laconi	Yamaha	7	Ret	7	8	Ret	Ret	12	Ret	13	9	5	**1**	3	14	11	12	103
12	(Spain) Juan Borja	Honda	8	11	9	7	9	5	8	7	10	12	Ret	Ret	17	5	Ret	9	92
13	(Japan) Nobuatsu Aoki	Suzuki	9	10	Ret			11	4	Ret	Ret	6	7	12	8	7	9	Ret	78
14	(Australia) Garry McCoy	Yamaha							15	Ret	11	8	9	3	7	8	8	13	65
15	(Japan) Haruchika Aoki	TSR-Honda	15	Ret	12	13	11	10	9	Ret	6	13	12	WD	11	12	15	15	54
16	(Netherlands) Jurgen van den Goorbergh	MuZ Weber	Ret	Ret	11	Ret	Ret	**8**	13	Ret	12	**11**	14	Ret	12	13	Ret	10	40
17	(Australia) Mick Doohan	Honda	4	2	DNS														33
18	(New Zealand) Simon Crafar	Yamaha	14	Ret	14	11	12	WD											19
18	(New Zealand) Simon Crafar	MuZ Weber								10									19
19	(France) Sébastien Gimbert	Honda	16	16	Ret	12	13	14	14	Ret	14	Ret	16	13	Ret	19	18	17	16
20	(Italy) Luca Cadalora	MuZ Weber	Ret		8	Ret	10	Ret	Ret		Ret	DNS							14
21	(Japan) Shinichi Ito	Honda		7															9
22	(Japan) Yukio Kagayama	Suzuki	11	12		DNS													9
23	(Spain) José David de Gea	TSR-Honda									15								8
23	(Spain) José David de Gea	Honda										Ret	Ret						8
23	(Spain) José David de Gea	Modenas KR3												14	13	20	14	Ret	8
24	(Germany) Markus Ober	Honda	17	17	15	14	15	13	Ret	Ret	17								7
25	(Australia) Anthony Gobert	MuZ Weber													Ret	18	10	DNS	6
26	(Spain) José Luis Cardoso	TSR-Honda	Ret	14	Ret	Ret	Ret	12	16	Ret		DNS	Ret	Ret	Ret	17	17	16	6
27	(United Kingdom) Michael Rutter	Honda	Ret	18	17	Ret	Ret	Ret	Ret	11	Ret	Ret	Ret	16	Ret	Ret	Ret	19	5
28	(France) Jean-Michel Bayle	Modenas KR3	12	Ret		Ret	Ret	Ret											4
29	(Japan) Noriyasu Numata	MuZ Weber		13															3
30	(Australia) Mark Willis	BSL	DNQ		18	DNQ	DNQ												3
30	(Australia) Mark Willis	Modenas KR3							17		16	16	17	Ret	15	16	16	14	3
31	(United States) Mike Hale	Modenas KR3	18	19	16	DNS						15	15	15	Ret	Ret	Ret	18	3
32	(United Kingdom) Jamie Whitham	Modenas KR3			Ret		14	Ret	Ret	Ret	Ret	DNS							2
33	(Australia) Steve Martin	Honda													14	21	Ret	20	2
	(France) Marc Garcia	Honda												17					0
	(Italy) Paolo Tessari	Paton					Ret	Ret											0
	(France) Bernard Garcia	MuZ Weber											Ret	DNQ					0
	(United Kingdom) John McGuinness	Honda								Ret									0
	(Australia) John Allen	Honda	DNQ																0
Pos.	Rider	Bike	MAL (Malaysia)	JPN (Japan)	ESP (Spain)	FRA (France)	ITA (Italy)	CAT (Catalonia)	NED (Netherlands)	GBR (United Kingdom)	GER (Germany)	CZE (Czech Republic)	IMO (Bologna)	VAL (Valencian Community)	AUS (Australia)	RSA (South Africa)	RIO (Rio de Janeiro (state))	ARG (Argentina)	Pts

Colour	Result
Gold	Winner
Silver	Second place
Bronze	Third place
Green	Points classification
Blue	Non-points classification
Blue	Non-classified finish (NC)
Purple	Retired, not classified (Ret)
Red	Did not qualify (DNQ)
Red	Did not pre-qualify (DNPQ)
Black	Disqualified (DSQ)
White	Did not start (DNS)
White	Withdrew (WD)
White	Race cancelled (C)
Blank	Did not practice (DNP)
Blank	Did not arrive (DNA)
Blank	Excluded (EX)

**Bold** – Pole position
Italics – Fastest lap

==== 250cc ====
Scoring system

Points were awarded to the top fifteen finishers. A rider had to finish the race to earn points.

Position	**1st**	**2nd**	**3rd**	**4th**	**5th**	**6th**	**7th**	**8th**	**9th**	**10th**	**11th**	**12th**	**13th**	**14th**	**15th**
Points	25	20	16	13	11	10	9	8	7	6	5	4	3	2	1

Pos	Rider	Bike	MAL (Malaysia)	JPN (Japan)	ESP (Spain)	FRA (France)	ITA (Italy)	CAT (Catalonia)	NED (Netherlands)	GBR (United Kingdom)	GER (Germany)	CZE (Czech Republic)	IMO (Bologna)	VAL (Valencian Community)	AUS (Australia)	RSA (South Africa)	RIO (Rio de Janeiro (state))	ARG (Argentina)	Pts
1	(Italy) Valentino Rossi	Aprilia	**5**	7	1	**Ret**	1	1	**2**	1	**1**	1	2	8	1	1	1	**3**	309
2	(Japan) Tohru Ukawa	Honda	2	2	2	1	3	**2**	4	4	Ret	3	12	1	3	4	2	2	261
3	(Italy) Loris Capirossi	Honda	1	3	3	Ret	DSQ		1	**2**	2	7	1	3	6	**5**	3	Ret	209
4	(Japan) Shinya Nakano	Yamaha	3	1	**Ret**	2	5	4	5	3	4	4	5	**4**	4	2	15	5	207
5	(Italy) Stefano Perugini	Honda	9	Ret	8	3	8	7	8	5	5	6	4	5	7	7	5	6	151
6	(Germany) Ralf Waldmann	Aprilia	WD		6	4	2	Ret	6	8	3	**2**	7	Ret	6	Ret	7	11	131
7	(France) Olivier Jacque	Yamaha	4	Ret	DNS						8	5	**3**	Ret	2	3	**4**	1	122
8	(Italy) Franco Battaini	Aprilia	Ret	**4**	4	6	6	3	7	Ret	Ret	10	6	2	8	10	Ret	Ret	121
9	(Argentina) Sebastián Porto	Yamaha	15	17	12	7	9	9	12	Ret	7	Ret	9	6	9	6	6	4	98
10	(United Kingdom) Jeremy McWilliams	Aprilia	7	Ret	7	11	4	6	3	6	Ret	8	13	Ret	**Ret**		Ret	DNS	83
11	(United Kingdom) Jason Vincent	Honda	12	Ret	11	5	7	Ret	9	Ret	Ret	9	Ret	7	12	11	11	12	70
12	(Australia) Anthony West	TSR-Honda	14	10	17	9	Ret	Ret	10	11	6	15	15	9	10	9	Ret	8	66
13	(Italy) Luca Boscoscuro	TSR-Honda	11	Ret	10	14	10	10	16	10	10	13	11	11	14	8	10	Ret	66
14	(Italy) Roberto Rolfo	Aprilia	10	12	9	Ret	Ret	5	Ret		12	11	10	13	DNS		9	7	62
15	(Japan) Tomomi Manako	Yamaha	Ret	8	14	17	13	12	13	14	14	14	14	Ret	11	12	8	9	52
16	(Germany) Alex Hofmann	TSR-Honda	17	18	15	8	16	11	11	13	9	Ret	17	10	13	13	12	10	51
17	(Italy) Marcellino Lucchi	Aprilia	6	9	5	15	**Ret**	Ret	Ret	7	13		8						49
18	(Japan) Masaki Tokudome	TSR-Honda	13	16	13	13	11	13	14	9	15	12	16	14	15	14	WD	15	37
19	(Japan) Naoki Matsudo	Yamaha	8	11				8	DNS										21
20	(Japan) Daijiro Kato	Honda		5															11
21	(France) Julien Allemand	TSR-Honda	18	Ret	Ret	Ret	14	Ret	18	15	11	Ret	Ret	Ret	Ret	Ret	13	Ret	11
22	(Japan) Tatsuya Yamaguchi	Honda		6															10
23	(Spain) Fonsi Nieto	Yamaha	22	14	18	12	17	Ret	19	17	18	17	18	15	16	15	17	14	10
24	(Japan) Toshihiko Honma	Yamaha				10	Ret												6
25	(Spain) Lucas Oliver	Yamaha	23	Ret	23	19		14	20	Ret	22	19	20	12	DNQ				6
26	(United Kingdom) Scott Smart	Aprilia										Ret	Ret	17	Ret	Ret	14	13	5
27	(Sweden) Johan Stigefelt	Yamaha	16	Ret	Ret	Ret	12	Ret	17	18	DSQ	Ret	19	Ret	19	17	19	18	4
28	(United Kingdom) Jamie Robinson	Yamaha								12									4
29	(Spain) David García	Yamaha	19	13	16	Ret	15	Ret	21	16	Ret	16	Ret	16	17	DNS	Ret	Ret	4
30	(Netherlands) Jarno Janssen	TSR-Honda	20	19	19	Ret	Ret	15	15	19	20	18	Ret	19	18	Ret	16	16	2
31	(Japan) Tekkyu Kayo	TSR-Honda		15															1
	(Argentina) Matías Ríos	Aprilia	21	21	22	18	19	16	DNS	Ret	24	20	Ret	Ret	20	Ret	18	Ret	0
	(Netherlands) Maurice Bolwerk	TSR-Honda	DNS						Ret	Ret	16	Ret	Ret	Ret	Ret	18	DNS	17	0
	(South Africa) Shane Norval	Honda								Ret						16			0
	(France) Vincent Philippe	Honda				16													0
	(Spain) Jesús Pérez	Honda			24			17											0
	(Germany) Mike Baldinger	TSR-Honda									17								0
	(Spain) Alex Debón	Honda			26			Ret						18					0
	(Italy) Filippo Cotti	Yamaha					18												0
	(Spain) Daniel Ribalta	Honda						18						Ret					0
	(United Kingdom) Adrian Coates	Honda								Ret									0
	(United Kingdom) Adrian Coates	Aprilia														19			0
	(Germany) Matthias Neukirchen	Aprilia									19								0
	(Argentina) Leandro Mulet	Honda																19	0
	(Germany) Markus Barth	Yamaha														20	Ret	Ret	0
	(Malaysia) Shahrol Yuzy	Honda	Ret		20														0
	(Netherlands) Rob Filart	Honda				20	Ret												0
	(Japan) Ken Eguchi	Yamaha		20															0
	(Argentina) Leandro Giuggia	Yamaha																20	0
	(Spain) Álvaro Molina	Honda			21			Ret						Ret					0
	(Germany) Dirk Heidolf	Honda									21								0
	(Slovakia) Vladimír Částka	Honda										21							0
	(Italy) Stefano Pennese	Aprilia											21						0
	(Australia) Roger Harrison	Yamaha													21				0
	(Netherlands) Rudie Markink	Aprilia							22										0
	(Netherlands) Arno Visscher	Aprilia							23			Ret							0
	(Germany) Christian Gemmel	Honda									23								0
	(Netherlands) Henk van de Lagemaat	Honda							24										0
	(Japan) Naohiro Negishi	Honda			25														0
	(Italy) Ivan Clementi	Aprilia					Ret						Ret						0
	(Malaysia) Meng Heng Kuang	Honda	Ret																0
	(Japan) Takehiko Kurokawa	TSR-Honda		Ret															0
	(Japan) Taro Sekiguchi	Yamaha		Ret															0
	(Spain) Manuel Luque	Yamaha			Ret														0
	(France) Hervé Mora	Aprilia				Ret													0
	(France) Julien da Costa	Honda				Ret													0
	(Italy) Ivan Mengozzi	Yamaha					Ret												0
	(Spain) Iván Silva	Honda						Ret											0
	(Netherlands) Andre Romein	Honda							Ret										0
	(United Kingdom) Paul Jones	Honda								Ret									0
	(Germany) Dirk Brockman	Honda									Ret								0
	(Germany) Lars Langer	Yamaha										Ret							0
	(Czech Republic) Radomil Rous	Honda										Ret							0
	(Italy) Mario De Matteo	Aprilia											Ret						0
	(Spain) David Ortega	TSR-Honda												Ret					0
	(Spain) Ismael Bonilla	Honda												Ret					0
	(Australia) Jay Taylor	Honda													Ret				0
	(Australia) Kevin Curtain	Honda													Ret				0
	(Australia) Shaun Geronimi	Yamaha													Ret				0
	(Argentina) Diego Pierluigi	Honda																Ret	0
	(Argentina) Gabriel Borgmann	Yamaha																Ret	0
	(France) Thomas Metro	Honda				DNQ													0
	(Netherlands) Johan ten Napel	Honda							DNQ										0
	(Czech Republic) Lukáš Vavrečka	Honda										DNQ							0
	(Australia) Aaron Clark	Honda													DNQ				0
	(Argentina) Roger Buffa	Yamaha																DNQ	0
Pos.	Rider	Bike	MAL (Malaysia)	JPN (Japan)	ESP (Spain)	FRA (France)	ITA (Italy)	CAT (Catalonia)	NED (Netherlands)	GBR (United Kingdom)	GER (Germany)	CZE (Czech Republic)	IMO (Bologna)	VAL (Valencian Community)	AUS (Australia)	RSA (South Africa)	RIO (Rio de Janeiro (state))	ARG (Argentina)	Pts

Colour	Result
Gold	Winner
Silver	Second place
Bronze	Third place
Green	Points classification
Blue	Non-points classification
Blue	Non-classified finish (NC)
Purple	Retired, not classified (Ret)
Red	Did not qualify (DNQ)
Red	Did not pre-qualify (DNPQ)
Black	Disqualified (DSQ)
White	Did not start (DNS)
White	Withdrew (WD)
White	Race cancelled (C)
Blank	Did not practice (DNP)
Blank	Did not arrive (DNA)
Blank	Excluded (EX)

**Bold** – Pole position
Italics – Fastest lap

==== 125cc ====
Scoring system

Points were awarded to the top fifteen finishers. A rider had to finish the race to earn points.

Position	**1st**	**2nd**	**3rd**	**4th**	**5th**	**6th**	**7th**	**8th**	**9th**	**10th**	**11th**	**12th**	**13th**	**14th**	**15th**
Points	25	20	16	13	11	10	9	8	7	6	5	4	3	2	1

Pos	Rider	Bike	MAL (Malaysia)	JPN (Japan)	ESP (Spain)	FRA (France)	ITA (Italy)	CAT (Catalonia)	NED (Netherlands)	GBR (United Kingdom)	GER (Germany)	CZE (Czech Republic)	IMO (Bologna)	VAL (Valencian Community)	AUS (Australia)	RSA (South Africa)	RIO (Rio de Janeiro (state))	ARG (Argentina)	Pts
1	(Spain) Emilio Alzamora	Honda	2	3	3	3	6	2	4	3	2	6	4	2	15	Ret	3	2	227
2	(Italy) Marco Melandri	Honda	DNS		Ret	6	2	3	8	5	**1**	1	**1**	Ret	1	3	**2**	1	226
3	(Japan) Masao Azuma	Honda	1	1	**1**	4	7	Ret	1	1	6	12	10	Ret	5	14	6	**Ret**	190
4	(Italy) Roberto Locatelli	Aprilia	18	Ret	5	1	**1**	**6**	3	4	4	**Ret**	11	8	6	4	8	3	173
5	(Japan) Noboru Ueda	Honda	Ret	Ret	8	5	3	4	2	2	5	2	5	3	**Ret**	Ret	1	Ret	171
6	(Italy) Gianluigi Scalvini	Aprilia	3	12	4	7	Ret	10	5	**6**	7	4	19	1	4	**1**	Ret	7	163
7	(France) Arnaud Vincent	Aprilia	**4**	Ret	10	2	5	1	7	9	10	10	3	**4**	Ret	2	13	Ret	155
8	(Italy) Simone Sanna	Honda	6	Ret	7	10	4	8	14	Ret	9	8	2	7	12	6	9	6	123
9	(Italy) Lucio Cecchinello	Honda	17	**6**	2	**Ret**	9	5	**Ret**	Ret	3	3	Ret	Ret	2	8	21	Ret	108
10	(Italy) Gino Borsoi	Aprilia	7	Ret	12	16	10	12	9	8	8	9	Ret	6	8	5	5	4	106
11	(Japan) Youichi Ui	Derbi	13	4	Ret	Ret		Ret	6	7	Ret	5	9	Ret	3	7	10	DNS	84
12	(Italy) Mirko Giansanti	Aprilia	9	16	13	13	11	14	12	10	13	15	13	Ret	11	Ret	4	5	66
13	(Italy) Ivan Goi	Honda	8	14	11	Ret	15	15	11	11	12	11	6	Ret	14	Ret	11	8	61
14	(Japan) Kazuto Sakata	Honda	10	8	15	9	8	7	10	13	19	Ret	Ret	12	13	15	17	Ret	56
15	(Germany) Steve Jenkner	Aprilia	15	13	17	8	14	Ret		DNS	17	7	7	5	10	11	16	Ret	52
16	(Spain) Jerónimo Vidal	Aprilia	5	Ret	6	14	12	Ret	17	15	16	17	18	Ret	7	10	12	Ret	47
17	(San Marino) Manuel Poggiali	Aprilia	12	18	9	Ret	13	Ret	13	Ret	11	WD	8	Ret	9	Ret	7	Ret	46
18	(France) Randy de Puniet	Aprilia	20	15	Ret	11	19	9	Ret	Ret	15	Ret	Ret	10	21	Ret	18	10	26
19	(Italy) Max Sabbatani	Honda	11	7	Ret	Ret	16	Ret		18	Ret	20	Ret	Ret	Ret	16	14	11	21
20	(Japan) Hideyuki Nakajo	Honda		2															20
21	(Italy) Alessandro Brannetti	Aprilia	16	21	14	Ret	20	11	Ret	16	Ret	18	15	11	16	9	DNS		20
22	(Spain) Ángel Nieto Jr.	Honda	14	11	16	12	17	Ret	DNS	17	20	16	Ret	15	18	13	15	Ret	16
23	(Spain) Pablo Nieto	Derbi	22	19	Ret	18	22	Ret	16	12	Ret	22	17	Ret	17	12	Ret	9	15
24	(Japan) Katsuji Uezu	Yamaha		5															11
25	(France) Frédéric Petit	Aprilia	Ret	20	Ret	15	18	13	15	Ret	DNS		16	Ret	19	18	20	12	9
26	(Germany) Reinhard Stolz	Honda	19	17	18	Ret	Ret	16	Ret	14	18	14	14	13	20	17	19	Ret	9
27	(Japan) Kazuhiro Kubo	Yamaha		9															7
28	(Spain) David Micó	Aprilia												9					7
29	(Japan) Minoru Nakamura	Honda		10															6
30	(Germany) Klaus Nöhles	Honda									14	13							5
31	(San Marino) William de Angelis	Honda											12						4
32	(Denmark) Robbin Harms	Aprilia													22	Ret	22	13	3
33	(Spain) Antonio Elías	Honda			21			Ret						14					2
	(Germany) Bernhard Absmeier	Aprilia	Ret	Ret	19	17	21	Ret	Ret	Ret	Ret	19	Ret	16					0
	(Spain) Emilio Delgado	Honda			20			Ret						17					0
	(Spain) Adrián Araujo	Honda			Ret			17						Ret					0
	(Spain) Luis Costa	Honda			Ret			18											0
	(Netherlands) Patrick Lakerveld	Honda							18										0
	(France) Grégory Lefort	Aprilia				19													0
	(Netherlands) Hans Koopman	Honda							19										0
	(United Kingdom) Leon Haslam	Honda								19									0
	(South Africa) Beaumont Levy	Honda														19			0
	(France) Eric Dubray	Honda				20													0
	(Netherlands) Ronnie Timmer	Honda							20										0
	(United Kingdom) Kenny Tibble	Honda								20									0
	(Italy) Cristian Magnani	Aprilia											20						0
	(Thailand) Direk Archewong	Honda	21																0
	(France) Hervé Louiset	Honda				21													0
	(Germany) Maik Stief	Honda									21								0
	(Czech Republic) Jakub Smrž	Honda										21							0
	(France) Mike Lougassi	Honda				22													0
	(Germany) Philipp Hafeneger	Honda									22								0
	(Italy) Marco Petrini	Aprilia					23												0
	(Germany) Dirk Reißmann	Aprilia									23								0
	(Czech Republic) Igor Kaláb	Honda										23							0
	(Australia) Broc Parkes	Honda													23				0
	(Brazil) César Barros	Honda															23		0
	(Italy) Gaspare Caffiero	Aprilia					24												0
	(Australia) Dennis Charlett	Honda													24				0
	(Brazil) Cristiano Vieira	Honda															24		0
	(United States) Jason DiSalvo	Honda															25	Ret	0
	(Italy) Marco Tresoldi	Honda					25												0
	(Brazil) Renato Velludo	Honda															26		0
	(Czech Republic) Jaroslav Huleš	Italjet										Ret	Ret						0
	(Malaysia) Magilai Meganathan	Honda	Ret																0
	(Japan) Jun Inageda	Honda		Ret															0
	(Italy) Riccardo Chiarello	Aprilia					Ret												0
	(Italy) Lorenzo Lanzi	Aprilia					Ret												0
	(Spain) Víctor Carrasco	Honda						Ret											0
	(Netherlands) Harold de Haan	Honda							Ret										0
	(United Kingdom) Chris Burns	Honda								Ret									0
	(United Kingdom) Andi Notman	Honda								Ret									0
	(Germany) Jarno Müller	Honda									Ret								0
	(San Marino) Alex de Angelis	Honda											Ret						0
	(Spain) Iván Martínez	Aprilia												Ret					0
	(Australia) Andrew Willy	Honda													Ret				0
	(Australia) Peter Galvin	Honda													Ret				0
	(Australia) Michael Teniswood	Honda													Ret				0
	(France) Jimmy Petit	Honda				DNS													0
	(Italy) Diego Giugovaz	Aprilia											DNS						0
	(Netherlands) Wilhelm van Leeuwen	Honda							DNQ										0
	(Czech Republic) Michal Březina	Honda										DNQ							0
	(South Africa) Robert Portman	Honda														DNQ			0
	(Brazil) Alexander di Grandi	Honda															DNQ		0
	(Argentina) Franco Lessio	Yamaha																DNQ	0
Pos.	Rider	Bike	MAL (Malaysia)	JPN (Japan)	ESP (Spain)	FRA (France)	ITA (Italy)	CAT (Catalonia)	NED (Netherlands)	GBR (United Kingdom)	GER (Germany)	CZE (Czech Republic)	IMO (Bologna)	VAL (Valencian Community)	AUS (Australia)	RSA (South Africa)	RIO (Rio de Janeiro (state))	ARG (Argentina)	Pts

Colour	Result
Gold	Winner
Silver	Second place
Bronze	Third place
Green	Points classification
Blue	Non-points classification
Blue	Non-classified finish (NC)
Purple	Retired, not classified (Ret)
Red	Did not qualify (DNQ)
Red	Did not pre-qualify (DNPQ)
Black	Disqualified (DSQ)
White	Did not start (DNS)
White	Withdrew (WD)
White	Race cancelled (C)
Blank	Did not practice (DNP)
Blank	Did not arrive (DNA)
Blank	Excluded (EX)

**Bold** – Pole position
Italics – Fastest lap

=== Manufacturers' standings ===
==== 500cc ====
Pos.	Manufacturer	MAL (Malaysia)	JPN (Japan)	ESP (Spain)	FRA (France)	ITA (Italy)	CAT (Catalonia)	NED (Netherlands)	GBR (United Kingdom)	GER (Germany)	CZE (Czech Republic)	IMO (Bologna)	VAL (Valencian Community)	AUS (Australia)	RSA (South Africa)	RIO (Rio de Janeiro (state))	ARG (Argentina)	Pts
1	(Japan) Honda	3	2	1	1	1	1	1	1	2	1	1	4	1	2	4	5	338
2	(Japan) Yamaha	2	3	2	5	2	7	5	4	3	4	3	1	2	1	1	2	280
3	(Japan) Suzuki	1	1	13	Ret	5	6	2	8	1	3	6	2	8	7	3	1	231
4	(Italy) Aprilia	13	Ret	Ret	3	4	4	11	3	7	5	13	11	Ret	15	12	11	104
5	(Germany) MuZ Weber	Ret	13	8	Ret	10	8	13	10	12	11	14	Ret	12	13	10	10	64
6	(Japan) TSR-Honda	15	14	12	13	11	10	9	Ret	6	13	12	Ret	11	12	15	15	56
7	(Malaysia) Modenas KR3	12	19	16	Ret	14	Ret	17	Ret	16	15	15	14	13	16	14	14	17
	(New Zealand) BSL	DNQ		18	DNQ	DNQ												0
	(Italy) Paton					Ret	Ret											0
Pos.	Manufacturer	MAL (Malaysia)	JPN (Japan)	ESP (Spain)	FRA (France)	ITA (Italy)	CAT (Catalonia)	NED (Netherlands)	GBR (United Kingdom)	GER (Germany)	CZE (Czech Republic)	IMO (Bologna)	VAL (Valencian Community)	AUS (Australia)	RSA (South Africa)	RIO (Rio de Janeiro (state))	ARG (Argentina)	Pts

==== 250cc ====
Pos.	Manufacturer	MAL (Malaysia)	JPN (Japan)	ESP (Spain)	FRA (France)	ITA (Italy)	CAT (Catalonia)	NED (Netherlands)	GBR (United Kingdom)	GER (Germany)	CZE (Czech Republic)	IMO (Bologna)	VAL (Valencian Community)	AUS (Australia)	RSA (South Africa)	RIO (Rio de Janeiro (state))	ARG (Argentina)	Pts
1	(Italy) Aprilia	5	4	1	4	1	1	2	1	1	1	2	2	1	1	1	3	338
2	(Japan) Honda	1	2	2	1	3	2	1	2	2	3	1	1	3	4	2	2	326
3	(Japan) Yamaha	3	1	12	2	5	4	5	3	4	4	3	4	2	2	4	1	249
4	(Japan) TSR-Honda	11	10	10	8	10	10	10	9	6	12	11	9	10	8	10	8	104
Pos.	Manufacturer	MAL (Malaysia)	JPN (Japan)	ESP (Spain)	FRA (France)	ITA (Italy)	CAT (Catalonia)	NED (Netherlands)	GBR (United Kingdom)	GER (Germany)	CZE (Czech Republic)	IMO (Bologna)	VAL (Valencian Community)	AUS (Australia)	RSA (South Africa)	RIO (Rio de Janeiro (state))	ARG (Argentina)	Pts

==== 125cc ====
Pos.	Manufacturer	MAL (Malaysia)	JPN (Japan)	ESP (Spain)	FRA (France)	ITA (Italy)	CAT (Catalonia)	NED (Netherlands)	GBR (United Kingdom)	GER (Germany)	CZE (Czech Republic)	IMO (Bologna)	VAL (Valencian Community)	AUS (Australia)	RSA (South Africa)	RIO (Rio de Janeiro (state))	ARG (Argentina)	Pts
1	(Japan) Honda	1	1	1	3	2	2	1	1	1	1	1	2	1	3	1	1	367
2	(Italy) Aprilia	3	12	4	1	1	1	3	4	4	4	3	1	4	1	4	3	271
3	(Spain) Derbi	13	4	Ret	18	22	Ret	6	7	Ret	5	9	Ret	3	7	10	9	91
4	(Japan) Yamaha		5														DNQ	11
	(Italy) Italjet										Ret	Ret						0
Pos.	Manufacturer	MAL (Malaysia)	JPN (Japan)	ESP (Spain)	FRA (France)	ITA (Italy)	CAT (Catalonia)	NED (Netherlands)	GBR (United Kingdom)	GER (Germany)	CZE (Czech Republic)	IMO (Bologna)	VAL (Valencian Community)	AUS (Australia)	RSA (South Africa)	RIO (Rio de Janeiro (state))	ARG (Argentina)	Pts
