= Alessandro Brannetti =

Italian motorcycle racer

- Nationality: Italian
- Born: 9 June 1980 (age 46); Fermo, Italy
Motorcycle racing career statistics
250cc World Championship
Active years	2006
Manufacturers	Honda
Starts / Wins / Podiums / Poles / F. laps / Points; 3 / 0 / 0 / 0 / 0 / 0
125cc World Championship
Active years	1999–2002
Manufacturers	Aprilia, Honda
Starts / Wins / Podiums / Poles / F. laps / Points; 33 / 0 / 0 / 0 / 0 / 44
Supersport World Championship
Active years	2007–2009
Manufacturers	Yamaha
Starts / Wins / Podiums / Poles / F. laps / Points; 3 / 0 / 0 / 0 / 0 / 0

Alessandro Brannetti (born 9 June 1980) is an Italian motorcycle racer.

== Career statistics ==
2004 - 15th, Superstock European Championship, Aprilia RSV 1000 R

=== Grand Prix motorcycle racing ===
==== By season ====
Season	Class	Motorcycle	Team	Race	Win	Podium	Pole	FLap	Pts	Plcd
1999	125cc	Aprilia	Future Strategies	14	0	0	0	0	20	21st
2000	125cc	Honda	Antinucci Racing Team	3	0	0	0	0	2	30th
2001	125cc	Aprilia	Team Crae	15	0	0	0	0	22	23rd
2002	125cc	Honda	Semprucci Angaia Racing	1	0	0	0	0	0	NC
2006	250cc	Honda	Grillini Racing	1	0	0	0	0	0	NC
2006	250cc	Honda	Arie Molenaar Racing	2	0	0	0	0	0	NC
Total				**36**	**0**	**0**	**0**	**0**	**44**	

==== Races by year ====
(key) (Races in bold indicate pole position, races in italics indicate fastest lap)

Year	Class	Bike	1	2	3	4	5	6	7	8	9	10	11	12	13	14	15	16	Pos.	Pts
1999	125cc	Aprilia	MAL; 16	JPN; 21	SPA; 14	FRA; Ret	ITA; 20	CAT; 11	NED; Ret	GBR; 16	GER; Ret	CZE; 18	IMO; 15	VAL; 11	AUS; 16	RSA; 9	BRA; DNS	ARG	21st	20
2000	125cc	Honda	RSA	MAL	JPN	SPA; Ret	FRA; 14	ITA; 17	CAT	NED	GBR	GER	CZE	POR	VAL	BRA	PAC	AUS	30th	2
2001	125cc	Aprilia	JPN; Ret	RSA; 17	SPA; Ret	FRA	ITA; 13	CAT; 20	NED; 9	GBR; Ret	GER; 17	CZE; 20	POR; 11	VAL; 20	PAC; 10	AUS; 22	MAL; Ret	BRA; 15	23rd	22
2002	125cc	Honda	JPN	RSA	SPA	FRA	ITA	CAT; Ret	NED	GBR	GER	CZE	POR	BRA	PAC	MAL	AUS	VAL	NC	0
2006	250cc	Honda	SPA	QAT	TUR	CHN	FRA	ITA; Ret	CAT	NED	GBR	GER	CZE	MAL	AUS	JPN	POR; Ret	VAL; 20	NC	0

=== Superstock European Championship ===
==== Races by year ====
(key) (Races in bold indicate pole position) (Races in italics indicate fastest lap)

Year	Bike	1	2	3	4	5	6	7	8	9	Pos	Pts
2002	Honda	VAL	MNZ; DNS	SIL; 23	LAU; 15	SMR; 5	BRA; 12	OSC; 10	NED; 18	IMO; 12	18th	26
2003	Aprilia	VAL	MNZ; 15	OSC; 15	SIL; 14	SMR; 13	BRA; 18	NED; 12	IMO; Ret	MAG; 18	19th	11
2004	Aprilia	VAL; Ret	SMR; 7	MNZ; DSQ	OSC; Ret	SIL; Ret	BRA	NED; 19	IMO; 10	MAG; 10	15th	21

=== Supersport World Championship ===
==== Races by year ====
(key)

Year	Bike	1	2	3	4	5	6	7	8	9	10	11	12	13	14	Pos.	Pts
2007	Yamaha	QAT	AUS	EUR	SPA	NED	ITA	GBR	SMR; 19	CZE	GBR	GER	ITA	FRA		NC	0
2008	Yamaha	QAT	AUS	SPA	NED	ITA	GER	SMR; 23	CZE	GBR	EUR	ITA	FRA	POR		NC	0
2009	Yamaha	AUS	QAT	SPA	NED	ITA	RSA	USA	SMR; Ret	GBR	CZE	GER	ITA	FRA	POR	NC	0
