= Juan Borja (motorcyclist) =

Spanish motorcycle racer

Juan Bautista Borja
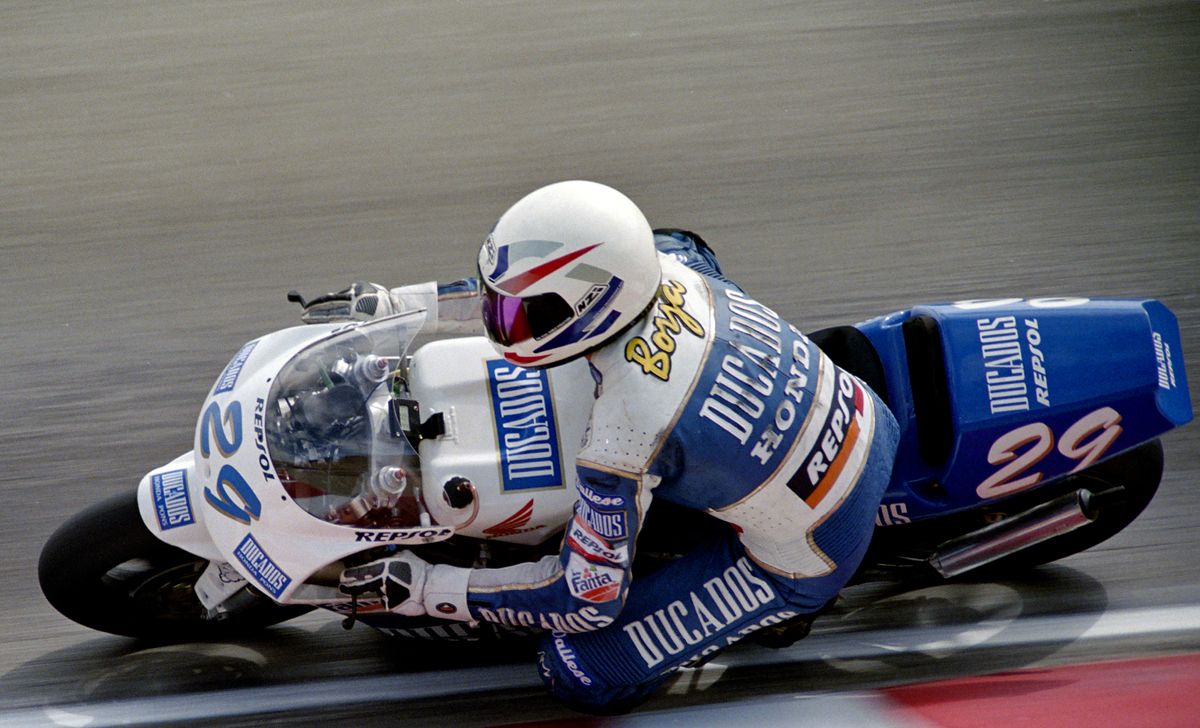
- Borja at the 1994 U.S. Grand Prix
- Nationality: Spain
- Born: 3 February 1970 (age 56); Altea, Spain
Motorcycle racing career statistics
Grand Prix motorcycle racing
Active years	1992–1999
First race	1993 125cc FIM Grand Prix
Last race	1999 500cc Argentine Grand Prix
Team(s)	Aprilia, Honda, ELF/ROC, Yamaha
Championships	0
Starts / Wins / Podiums / Poles / F. laps / Points; 90 / 0 / 0 / 0 / 0 / 228
Superbike World Championship
Active years	2000–2003
Manufacturers	Ducati, Yamaha
Championships	0
2003 championship position	13th (87 pts)
Starts / Wins / Podiums / Poles / F. laps / Points; 91 / 0 / 2 / 0 / 1 / 296

Juan Bautista Borja (born 3 February 1970) is a Spanish former Grand Prix motorcycle road racer. Borja was the 1992 FCIM European 125cc Champion.

== Career ==
Having won the FCIM 125cc European Championship in 1992, Borja first raced on the world stage at the 1993 FIM motorcycle Grand Prix at the Circuito del Jarama, Madrid, but retired on lap 19 in the 250cc class riding a privateer Honda. For 1994, he gained a series of one-off privateer rides in the 250cc class, starting with an Aprilia at the 1994 Australian motorcycle Grand Prix, and finishing the season on a Honda, placing him 30th in the championship.

Moving to the 500cc class for 1995, Borja rode out the season placing twelfth on the ROC-Yamaha. He then spent two seasons on the ELF 500 ROC sponsored by Pepsi and then Shell, placing 14th in 1996 and 17th in 1997 on an under-developed and hence unreliable bike. For 1998, he moved to the well backed Movistar Honda Pons riding the Honda NSR500, but unreliability meant he finished the season in 32nd. Improved factory support in 1999 meant that he finished 12th.

Without a ride for the 2000 Grand Prix motorcycle racing season, after the crash of Carl Fogarty which ended his racing career, from race six onwards in 2000, Borja moved to World Superbikes, replacing Ben Bostrom in the works Ducati-Infostrada, finishing the season in 12th. Replaced by younger compatriate Rubén Xaus for the 2001 season, Borja moved to Spanish privateer team Panavto Yamaha riding the Yamaha YZF-R7, but a lack of funds and unreliability meant that he finished the season 32nd. For the 2002 season, he returned to riding a Ducati 998RS for Spanish privateer team Spaziotel Racing, finishing 12th. With the same team but now under the DFX Racing banner, he finished 13th in the 2003 season.

In light of their sponsorship from Sterilgarda for the 2004 season, the DFX team choose Italian rider Marco Borciani. Unable to find a team or sponsorship, Borja was forced to retire at the age of 34.

Sporting positions
Preceded by (Germany) Oliver Koch	125 cc motorcycle European Champion; 1992	Succeeded by (Italy) Stefano Perugini
