= Moriwaki MD211VF =

Racing motorcycle

- Manufacturer: Moriwaki
- Production: 2003–2005
- Predecessor: None
- Successor: None
- Class: MotoGP
- Engine: 990 cc four-stroke
- Transmission: Chain

The Moriwaki MD211VF was a racing motorcycle made by Moriwaki Engineering, which was used in the MotoGP class of Grand Prix motorcycle racing from 2003 until 2005 in various wildcard entries. The name is an amalgamation of words and letters, namely the "MD", "F" and "211V". The "MD" stands for "Moriwaki Dream", the "F" for "Fighter" and the "211V" represents the Honda RC211V engine which powers it. Another reason why it is called the "Moriwaki Dream" was because the dream of the owner of the company, Mamoru Moriwaki, was to "beat a factory team".

== History ==
After minor participations in the 500 and 250cc classes in the past, with riders like Shunji Yatsushiro and Osamu Hiwatashi entering back in the 1980s on Moriwaki coloured Honda NSR250, the company's owner Mamoru Moriwaki wanted to return to grand prix motorcycle racing in the early 2000s, aiming to officially return in 2004. Plans to enter the class with a newly designed bike using Honda RC211V V5 engine were as early as 2001 as a result of the 500cc class coming to an end in 2002, being rebranded as the MotoGP class, but did not come to fruition until 2003 when it entered the class as a wildcard rider.

Before the start of the 2003 season, Moriwaki tested their motorbike during the tests for wildcard riders at the Motegi circuit in November 2002 with Masao Okuno. The bike was also fitted with Dunlop tyres.

== Season progress ==
=== 2003 ===
Moriwaki entered their MD211VF in 2003 as a wildcard entry in two rounds, the Japanese and Pacific rounds, the driver line-up consisting of Tamaki Serizawa on both occasions. Initially, Moriwaki had not planned to enter the sport so quickly, but an entry slot came free when the WCM team offered one of their seats because they weren't able to prepare one of their bikes in time for the race.

At the opening round in Japan, Serizawa finished in nineteenth place and at the Pacific race, he finished eighteenth.

=== 2004 ===
Development in 2004 was unsure at first, the team not knowing whether to compete a full season or continue to enter in wildcard appearances only. During the off-season however, Dunlop chose to favour Moriwaki over the factory Kawasaki team and signed the team to become a development team for their tyres. As an outcome of the contract, the team flew to Sepang, Malaysia to test tyres there.

The driver line-up had changed this year, Serizawa was let go and the team brought on board Australian Andrew Pitt and later on experienced Frenchman Olivier Jacque to ride a total of five races - all as wildcard appearances still.

Moriwaki participated for the first time in Europe, at the Italian grand prix, where Pitt finished seventeenth and last after insufficient fuel supply caused him to lose fourteenth place. At the next round in Catalunya however, he took the team's first ever points by finishing fourteenth, granting him two points. For the first time in 30 years, the company had decided to not enter the Suzuka 8 Hours race this year, instead opting to focus its efforts on MotoGP racing instead. At round 10 of the season in the Czech Republic, Pitt finished in sixteenth place, narrowly missing out on one point.

After the good results by Pitt, Jacque replaced him for the remaining two races Moriwaki participated in. In Japan, he immediately scored a good result for the team by finishing eleventh, moving up from 21st to twelfth before he inherited the position after Troy Bayliss slid out of contention with five laps to go, scoring five points for the team - the highest position and most points the team had scored. At the last race in Valencia, Jacque retired the bike, one lap down from race winner Valentino Rossi.

=== 2005 ===
For their final season in MotoGP, both Pitt and Jacque would not return to the team. The new driver line-up consisted of veteran Tohru Ukawa and rookie Naoki Matsudo, the team only competing in two rounds of the season - the Chinese and Japanese rounds.

In Shanghai, Ukawa scored Moriwaki's final MotoGP point by finishing fifteenth and in Motegi, Matsudo retired the bike.

== Specifications ==
Moriwaki MD211VF Specifications
Engine
Engine type:	990 cc four-stroke
Displacement:	
Ignition:	
Fuel System:	
Fuel:	
Lubricants:	
Lubrication system:	
Data recording:	
Maximum power:	
Maximum speed:	
Exhaust:	
Transmission
Type:	6-speed removable sequential (always in gear)
Primary drive:	Gear
Clutch:	
Final drive:	Chain
Chassis and running gear
Frame type:	
Front suspension:	
Rear suspension:	
Front/rear wheels:	
Front/rear tyres:	Dunlop tyres
Front brake:	
Rear brake:	
Weight:	
Fuel capacity:	
