= 2004 British motorcycle Grand Prix =

(United Kingdom) 2004 British Grand Prix
Race details
- Race 9 of 16 races in the 2004 Grand Prix motorcycle racing season
- Date: 25 July 2004
- Official name: Cinzano British Grand Prix
- Location: Donington Park
- Course: Permanent racing facility; 4.023 km (2.500 mi)

MotoGP
Pole position
- Rider: (Italy) Valentino Rossi
- Time: 1:28.720
Fastest lap
- Rider: (United States) Colin Edwards
- Time: 1:29.973 on lap 8
Podium
- First: (Italy) Valentino Rossi
- Second: (United States) Colin Edwards
- Third: (Spain) Sete Gibernau

250cc
Pole position
- Rider: (San Marino) Alex de Angelis
- Time: 1:32.430
Fastest lap
- Rider: (Spain) Daniel Pedrosa
- Time: 1:33.217 on lap 11
Podium
- First: (Spain) Daniel Pedrosa
- Second: (Argentina) Sebastián Porto
- Third: (France) Randy de Puniet

125cc
Pole position
- Rider: (Italy) Andrea Dovizioso
- Time: 1:37.211
Fastest lap
- Rider: (Spain) Álvaro Bautista
- Time: 1:38.263 on lap 8
Podium
- First: (Italy) Andrea Dovizioso
- Second: (Spain) Álvaro Bautista
- Third: (Spain) Jorge Lorenzo

The 2004 British motorcycle Grand Prix was the ninth round of the 2004 MotoGP Championship. It took place on the weekend of 23–25 July 2004 at the Donington Park circuit.

For the first time in MotoGP class era history the MotoGP class race started at unusual 15:30 local time slot rather than usual 13:00 local time slot to avoid direct clash with Formula One 2004 German Grand Prix that held on the same date.

== MotoGP classification ==
| Pos. | No. | Rider | Team | Manufacturer | Laps | Time/Retired | Grid | Points |
|---|---|---|---|---|---|---|---|---|
| 1 | 46 | (Italy) Valentino Rossi | Gauloises Fortuna Yamaha | Yamaha | 30 | 45:30.473 | 1 | 25 |
| 2 | 45 | (United States) Colin Edwards | Telefónica Movistar Honda MotoGP | Honda | 30 | +2.945 | 5 | 20 |
| 3 | 15 | (Spain) Sete Gibernau | Telefónica Movistar Honda MotoGP | Honda | 30 | +4.426 | 2 | 16 |
| 4 | 69 | (United States) Nicky Hayden | Repsol Honda Team | Honda | 30 | +6.096 | 6 | 13 |
| 5 | 12 | (Australia) Troy Bayliss | Ducati Marlboro Team | Ducati | 30 | +14.711 | 4 | 11 |
| 6 | 7 | (Spain) Carlos Checa | Gauloises Fortuna Yamaha | Yamaha | 30 | +17.110 | 7 | 10 |
| 7 | 65 | (Italy) Loris Capirossi | Ducati Marlboro Team | Ducati | 30 | +23.313 | 3 | 9 |
| 8 | 21 | (United States) John Hopkins | Team Suzuki MotoGP | Suzuki | 30 | +28.121 | 15 | 8 |
| 9 | 4 | (Brazil) Alex Barros | Repsol Honda Team | Honda | 30 | +35.380 | 9 | 7 |
| 10 | 50 | (United Kingdom) Neil Hodgson | D'Antin MotoGP | Ducati | 30 | +44.468 | 13 | 6 |
| 11 | 11 | (Spain) Rubén Xaus | D'Antin MotoGP | Ducati | 30 | +47.490 | 10 | 5 |
| 12 | 3 | (Italy) Max Biaggi | Camel Honda | Honda | 30 | +54.004 | 8 | 4 |
| 13 | 67 | (United Kingdom) Shane Byrne | MS Aprilia Racing | Aprilia | 30 | +57.378 | 17 | 3 |
| 14 | 6 | (Japan) Makoto Tamada | Camel Honda | Honda | 30 | +1:07.158 | 14 | 2 |
| 15 | 56 | (Japan) Shinya Nakano | Kawasaki Racing Team | Kawasaki | 30 | +1:15.795 | 11 | 1 |
| 16 | 99 | (United Kingdom) Jeremy McWilliams | MS Aprilia Racing | Aprilia | 30 | +1:26.485 | 18 | |
| 17 | 10 | (United States) Kenny Roberts Jr. | Team Suzuki MotoGP | Suzuki | 29 | +1 lap | 12 | |
| 18 | 9 | (Japan) Nobuatsu Aoki | Proton Team KR | Proton KR | 29 | +1 lap | 21 | |
| 19 | 66 | (Germany) Alex Hofmann | Kawasaki Racing Team | Kawasaki | 29 | +1 lap | 20 | |
| 20 | 84 | (Italy) Michel Fabrizio | WCM | Harris WCM | 29 | +1 lap | 19 | |
| Ret | 17 | (Japan) Norifumi Abe | Fortuna Gauloises Tech 3 | Yamaha | 28 | Accident | 16 | |
| Ret | 80 | (United States) Kurtis Roberts | Proton Team KR | Proton KR | 11 | Retirement | 22 | |
| Ret | 35 | (United Kingdom) Chris Burns | WCM | Harris WCM | 2 | Retirement | 23 | |
| DNS | 33 | (Italy) Marco Melandri | Fortuna Gauloises Tech 3 | Yamaha | | Did not start | | |

== 250 cc classification ==
| Pos. | No. | Rider | Manufacturer | Laps | Time/Retired | Grid | Points |
|---|---|---|---|---|---|---|---|
| 1 | 26 | (Spain) Daniel Pedrosa | Honda | 27 | 42:17.705 | 4 | 25 |
| 2 | 19 | (Argentina) Sebastián Porto | Aprilia | 27 | +6.003 | 2 | 20 |
| 3 | 7 | (France) Randy de Puniet | Aprilia | 27 | +11.463 | 5 | 16 |
| 4 | 51 | (San Marino) Alex de Angelis | Aprilia | 27 | +12.722 | 1 | 13 |
| 5 | 10 | (Spain) Fonsi Nieto | Aprilia | 27 | +30.430 | 9 | 11 |
| 6 | 14 | (Australia) Anthony West | Aprilia | 27 | +33.007 | 8 | 10 |
| 7 | 21 | (Italy) Franco Battaini | Aprilia | 27 | +51.931 | 13 | 9 |
| 8 | 8 | (Japan) Naoki Matsudo | Yamaha | 27 | +55.055 | 11 | 8 |
| 9 | 73 | (Japan) Hiroshi Aoyama | Honda | 27 | +57.422 | 3 | 7 |
| 10 | 50 | (France) Sylvain Guintoli | Aprilia | 27 | +59.456 | 15 | 6 |
| 11 | 11 | (Spain) Joan Olivé | Aprilia | 27 | +1:06.270 | 14 | 5 |
| 12 | 25 | (Italy) Alex Baldolini | Aprilia | 27 | +1:06.566 | 20 | 4 |
| 13 | 9 | (France) Hugo Marchand | Aprilia | 27 | +1:21.025 | 21 | 3 |
| 14 | 16 | (Sweden) Johan Stigefelt | Aprilia | 27 | +1:21.800 | 16 | 2 |
| 15 | 96 | (Czech Republic) Jakub Smrž | Honda | 27 | +1:29.120 | 17 | 1 |
| 16 | 52 | (Spain) José David de Gea | Honda | 27 | +1:32.733 | 18 | |
| 17 | 28 | (Germany) Dirk Heidolf | Aprilia | 27 | +1:33.155 | 22 | |
| 18 | 17 | (Germany) Klaus Nöhles | Honda | 26 | +1 lap | 23 | |
| 19 | 44 | (Japan) Taro Sekiguchi | Yamaha | 26 | +1 lap | 25 | |
| 20 | 65 | (United Kingdom) Lee Dickinson | Honda | 26 | +1 lap | 27 | |
| 21 | 43 | (Czech Republic) Radomil Rous | Yamaha | 26 | +1 lap | 28 | |
| Ret | 12 | (France) Arnaud Vincent | Aprilia | 24 | Retirement | 19 | |
| Ret | 24 | (Spain) Toni Elías | Honda | 13 | Retirement | 6 | |
| Ret | 6 | (Spain) Alex Debón | Honda | 3 | Accident | 10 | |
| Ret | 54 | (San Marino) Manuel Poggiali | Aprilia | 2 | Accident | 7 | |
| Ret | 57 | (United Kingdom) Chaz Davies | Aprilia | 2 | Accident | 12 | |
| Ret | 36 | (France) Erwan Nigon | Aprilia | 0 | Accident | 24 | |
| DNS | 33 | (Spain) Héctor Faubel | Aprilia | 0 | Did not start | 29 | |
| DNS | 64 | (Sweden) Frederik Watz | Yamaha | 0 | Did not start | 26 | |
| DNS | 2 | (Italy) Roberto Rolfo | Honda | | Did not start | | |
| DNS | 40 | (Italy) Max Sabbatani | Yamaha | | Did not start | | |
| DNQ | 66 | (United Kingdom) Tony Campbell | Yamaha | | Did not qualify | | |
| DNQ | 67 | (United Kingdom) Bruce Dunn | Honda | | Did not qualify | | |

== 125 cc classification ==
| Pos. | No. | Rider | Manufacturer | Laps | Time/Retired | Grid | Points |
|---|---|---|---|---|---|---|---|
| 1 | 34 | (Italy) Andrea Dovizioso | Honda | 25 | 41:14.592 | 1 | 25 |
| 2 | 19 | (Spain) Álvaro Bautista | Aprilia | 25 | +3.807 | 9 | 20 |
| 3 | 48 | (Spain) Jorge Lorenzo | Derbi | 25 | +8.250 | 6 | 16 |
| 4 | 36 | (Finland) Mika Kallio | KTM | 25 | +8.641 | 3 | 13 |
| 5 | 24 | (Italy) Simone Corsi | Honda | 25 | +16.706 | 4 | 11 |
| 6 | 21 | (Germany) Steve Jenkner | Aprilia | 25 | +16.993 | 11 | 10 |
| 7 | 41 | (Japan) Youichi Ui | Aprilia | 25 | +22.120 | 5 | 9 |
| 8 | 10 | (Spain) Julián Simón | Honda | 25 | +23.070 | 8 | 8 |
| 9 | 23 | (Italy) Gino Borsoi | Aprilia | 25 | +23.860 | 15 | 7 |
| 10 | 42 | (Italy) Gioele Pellino | Aprilia | 25 | +29.993 | 23 | 6 |
| 11 | 7 | (Italy) Stefano Perugini | Gilera | 25 | +30.475 | 18 | 5 |
| 12 | 52 | (Czech Republic) Lukáš Pešek | Honda | 25 | +30.593 | 20 | 4 |
| 13 | 14 | (Hungary) Gábor Talmácsi | Malaguti | 25 | +40.502 | 22 | 3 |
| 14 | 32 | (Italy) Fabrizio Lai | Gilera | 25 | +41.140 | 13 | 2 |
| 15 | 63 | (France) Mike Di Meglio | Aprilia | 25 | +45.295 | 16 | 1 |
| 16 | 33 | (Spain) Sergio Gadea | Aprilia | 25 | +46.170 | 24 | |
| 17 | 69 | (Denmark) Robbin Harms | Honda | 25 | +49.325 | 21 | |
| 18 | 12 | (Switzerland) Thomas Lüthi | Honda | 25 | +54.672 | 17 | |
| 19 | 25 | (Hungary) Imre Tóth | Aprilia | 25 | +1:17.223 | 29 | |
| 20 | 20 | (Germany) Georg Fröhlich | Honda | 25 | +1:20.434 | 35 | |
| 21 | 49 | (United Kingdom) Christian Elkin | Honda | 25 | +1:23.026 | 30 | |
| 22 | 18 | (Italy) Simone Sanna | Aprilia | 25 | +1:24.436 | 26 | |
| 23 | 35 | (Czech Republic) Václav Bittman | Honda | 25 | +1:28.933 | 28 | |
| 24 | 30 | (Italy) Raffaele De Rosa | Honda | 25 | +1:33.750 | 32 | |
| 25 | 85 | (United Kingdom) Eugene Laverty | Honda | 24 | +1 lap | 31 | |
| 26 | 51 | (United Kingdom) Kris Weston | Honda | 23 | +2 laps | 36 | |
| 27 | 84 | (United Kingdom) Tommy Bridewell | Honda | 23 | +2 laps | 37 | |
| Ret | 47 | (Spain) Ángel Rodríguez | Derbi | 24 | Accident | 25 | |
| Ret | 15 | (Italy) Roberto Locatelli | Aprilia | 24 | Retirement | 7 | |
| Ret | 66 | (Finland) Vesa Kallio | Aprilia | 22 | Retirement | 27 | |
| Ret | 6 | (Italy) Mirko Giansanti | Aprilia | 17 | Retirement | 12 | |
| Ret | 8 | (Italy) Manuel Manna | Malaguti | 16 | Retirement | 34 | |
| Ret | 16 | (Netherlands) Raymond Schouten | Honda | 9 | Retirement | 33 | |
| Ret | 58 | (Italy) Marco Simoncelli | Aprilia | 4 | Retirement | 10 | |
| Ret | 22 | (Spain) Pablo Nieto | Aprilia | 0 | Accident | 14 | |
| Ret | 3 | (Spain) Héctor Barberá | Aprilia | 0 | Accident | 2 | |
| Ret | 54 | (Italy) Mattia Pasini | Aprilia | 0 | Accident | 19 | |
| DNS | 28 | (Spain) Jordi Carchano | Aprilia | | Did not start | | |

== Championship standings after the race (MotoGP) ==
Below are the standings for the top five riders and constructors after round nine has concluded.

Riders' Championship standings

| Pos. | Rider | Points |
|---|---|---|
| 1 | (Italy) Valentino Rossi | 164 |
| 2 | (Spain) Sete Gibernau | 142 |
| 3 | (Italy) Max Biaggi | 142 |
| 4 | (United States) Colin Edwards | 95 |
| 5 | (Brazil) Alex Barros | 86 |

Constructors' Championship standings

| Pos. | Constructor | Points |
|---|---|---|
| 1 | (Japan) Honda | 200 |
| 2 | (Japan) Yamaha | 179 |
| 3 | (Italy) Ducati | 83 |
| 4 | (Japan) Kawasaki | 42 |
| 5 | (Japan) Suzuki | 42 |

- Note: Only the top five positions are included for both sets of standings.

| Previous race: 2004 German Grand Prix | FIM Grand Prix World Championship; 2004 season | Next race: 2004 Czech Republic Grand Prix |
| Previous race: 2003 British Grand Prix | British motorcycle Grand Prix | Next race: 2005 British Grand Prix |
