= 2004 Rio de Janeiro motorcycle Grand Prix =

(Rio de Janeiro (state)) 2004 Rio de Janeiro Grand Prix
Race details
- Race 7 of 16 races in the 2004 Grand Prix motorcycle racing season
- Date: 4 July 2004
- Official name: Cinzano Rio Grand Prix
- Location: Autódromo Internacional Nelson Piquet
- Course: Permanent racing facility; 4.933 km (3.065 mi)

MotoGP
Pole position
- Rider: (United States) Kenny Roberts Jr.
- Time: 1:48.418
Fastest lap
- Rider: (Japan) Makoto Tamada
- Time: 1:49.789 on lap 7
Podium
- First: (Japan) Makoto Tamada
- Second: (Italy) Max Biaggi
- Third: (United States) Nicky Hayden

250cc
Pole position
- Rider: (Argentina) Sebastián Porto
- Time: 1:52.503
Fastest lap
- Rider: (Argentina) Sebastián Porto
- Time: 1:53.573 on lap 2
Podium
- First: (San Marino) Manuel Poggiali
- Second: (Spain) Daniel Pedrosa
- Third: (Spain) Toni Elías

125cc
Pole position
- Rider: (Spain) Héctor Barberá
- Time: 1:57.323
Fastest lap
- Rider: (Spain) Héctor Barberá
- Time: 1:57.789 on lap 4
Podium
- First: (Spain) Héctor Barberá
- Second: (Australia) Casey Stoner
- Third: (Italy) Andrea Dovizioso

The 2004 Rio de Janeiro motorcycle Grand Prix was the seventh round of the 2004 MotoGP Championship. It took place on the weekend of 2–4 July 2004 at Autódromo Internacional Nelson Piquet.

== MotoGP classification ==
Pos.	No.	Rider	Team	Manufacturer	Laps	Time/Retired	Grid	Points
1	6	(Japan) Makoto Tamada	Camel Honda	Honda	24	44:21.976	7	25
2	3	(Italy) Max Biaggi	Camel Honda	Honda	24	+2.019	2	20
3	69	(United States) Nicky Hayden	Repsol Honda Team	Honda	24	+5.764	3	16
4	65	(Italy) Loris Capirossi	Ducati Marlboro Team	Ducati	24	+11.145	6	13
5	4	(Brazil) Alex Barros	Repsol Honda Team	Honda	24	+12.951	5	11
6	45	(United States) Colin Edwards	Telefónica Movistar Honda MotoGP	Honda	24	+13.904	11	10
7	10	(United States) Kenny Roberts Jr.	Team Suzuki MotoGP	Suzuki	24	+23.493	1	9
8	17	(Japan) Norifumi Abe	Fortuna Gauloises Tech 3	Yamaha	24	+27.498	15	8
9	56	(Japan) Shinya Nakano	Kawasaki Racing Team	Kawasaki	24	+27.802	9	7
10	7	(Spain) Carlos Checa	Gauloises Fortuna Yamaha	Yamaha	24	+36.808	12	6
11	66	(Germany) Alex Hofmann	Kawasaki Racing Team	Kawasaki	24	+37.713	14	5
12	11	(Spain) Rubén Xaus	D'Antin MotoGP	Ducati	24	+48.924	16	4
13	33	(Italy) Marco Melandri	Fortuna Gauloises Tech 3	Yamaha	24	+57.102	13	3
14	99	(United Kingdom) Jeremy McWilliams	MS Aprilia Racing	Aprilia	24	+1:03.046	18	2
15	21	(United States) John Hopkins	Team Suzuki MotoGP	Suzuki	24	+1:10.296	17	1
16	50	(United Kingdom) Neil Hodgson	D'Antin MotoGP	Ducati	24	+1:12.548	19	
17	67	(United Kingdom) Shane Byrne	MS Aprilia Racing	Aprilia	24	+1:19.734	20	
18	9	(Japan) Nobuatsu Aoki	Proton Team KR	Proton KR	24	+1:31.512	21	
19	80	(United States) Kurtis Roberts	Proton Team KR	Proton KR	24	+1:43.627	22	
20	35	(United Kingdom) Chris Burns	WCM	Harris WCM	23	+1 lap	23	
Ret	46	(Italy) Valentino Rossi	Gauloises Fortuna Yamaha	Yamaha	12	Accident	8	
Ret	52	(Spain) José David de Gea	WCM	Harris WCM	7	Accident	24	
Ret	12	(Australia) Troy Bayliss	Ducati Marlboro Team	Ducati	3	Accident	10	
Ret	15	(Spain) Sete Gibernau	Telefónica Movistar Honda MotoGP	Honda	1	Accident	4	

== 250 cc classification ==
Pos.	No.	Rider	Manufacturer	Laps	Time/Retired	Grid	Points
1	54	(San Marino) Manuel Poggiali	Aprilia	22	41:56.561	4	25
2	26	(Spain) Daniel Pedrosa	Honda	22	+0.076	6	20
3	24	(Spain) Toni Elías	Honda	22	+3.792	2	16
4	51	(San Marino) Alex de Angelis	Aprilia	22	+4.678	5	13
5	10	(Spain) Fonsi Nieto	Aprilia	22	+20.393	10	11
6	73	(Japan) Hiroshi Aoyama	Honda	22	+20.576	15	10
7	2	(Italy) Roberto Rolfo	Honda	22	+30.399	9	9
8	7	(France) Randy de Puniet	Aprilia	22	+34.742	3	8
9	6	(Spain) Alex Debón	Honda	22	+36.021	12	7
10	21	(Italy) Franco Battaini	Aprilia	22	+36.476	8	6
11	9	(France) Hugo Marchand	Aprilia	22	+50.991	23	5
12	50	(France) Sylvain Guintoli	Aprilia	22	+52.196	7	4
13	57	(United Kingdom) Chaz Davies	Aprilia	22	+53.576	19	3
14	8	(Japan) Naoki Matsudo	Yamaha	22	+1:01.641	14	2
15	28	(Germany) Dirk Heidolf	Aprilia	22	+1:02.014	24	1
16	17	(Germany) Klaus Nöhles	Honda	22	+1:11.756	20	
17	36	(France) Erwan Nigon	Yamaha	22	+1:11.999	25	
18	77	(France) Grégory Lefort	Aprilia	22	+1:20.226	21	
19	12	(France) Arnaud Vincent	Aprilia	22	+1:22.037	18	
20	44	(Japan) Taro Sekiguchi	Yamaha	21	+1 lap	27	
Ret	96	(Czech Republic) Jakub Smrž	Honda	21	Accident	17	
Ret	19	(Argentina) Sebastián Porto	Aprilia	20	Retirement	1	
Ret	11	(Spain) Joan Olivé	Aprilia	11	Retirement	13	
Ret	40	(Italy) Max Sabbatani	Yamaha	6	Retirement	28	
Ret	14	(Australia) Anthony West	Aprilia	2	Accident	11	
Ret	16	(Sweden) Johan Stigefelt	Aprilia	1	Accident	26	
Ret	25	(Italy) Alex Baldolini	Aprilia	1	Retirement	16	
Ret	34	(France) Eric Bataille	Honda	0	Accident	22	
DNS	33	(Spain) Héctor Faubel	Aprilia		Did not start		

== 125 cc classification ==
Pos.	No.	Rider	Manufacturer	Laps	Time/Retired	Grid	Points
1	3	(Spain) Héctor Barberá	Aprilia	21	41:41.459	1	25
2	27	(Australia) Casey Stoner	KTM	21	+0.096	5	20
3	34	(Italy) Andrea Dovizioso	Honda	21	+0.202	2	16
4	15	(Italy) Roberto Locatelli	Aprilia	21	+0.359	6	13
5	6	(Italy) Mirko Giansanti	Aprilia	21	+0.737	7	11
6	58	(Italy) Marco Simoncelli	Aprilia	21	+7.614	20	10
7	22	(Spain) Pablo Nieto	Aprilia	21	+7.769	8	9
8	36	(Finland) Mika Kallio	KTM	21	+12.725	18	8
9	19	(Spain) Álvaro Bautista	Aprilia	21	+13.950	14	7
10	54	(Italy) Mattia Pasini	Aprilia	21	+19.938	4	6
11	50	(Italy) Andrea Ballerini	Aprilia	21	+25.983	9	5
12	63	(France) Mike Di Meglio	Aprilia	21	+26.633	16	4
13	24	(Italy) Simone Corsi	Honda	21	+26.996	15	3
14	10	(Spain) Julián Simón	Honda	21	+27.131	13	2
15	52	(Czech Republic) Lukáš Pešek	Honda	21	+30.697	17	1
16	42	(Italy) Gioele Pellino	Aprilia	21	+30.806	22	
17	23	(Italy) Gino Borsoi	Aprilia	21	+38.591	12	
18	25	(Hungary) Imre Tóth	Aprilia	21	+52.505	19	
19	14	(Hungary) Gábor Talmácsi	Malaguti	21	+59.593	21	
20	21	(Germany) Steve Jenkner	Aprilia	21	+1:07.333	11	
21	66	(Finland) Vesa Kallio	Aprilia	21	+1:20.065	27	
22	7	(Italy) Stefano Perugini	Gilera	21	+1:48.237	24	
23	8	(Italy) Manuel Manna	Malaguti	21	+1:48.311	28	
24	16	(Netherlands) Raymond Schouten	Honda	21	+1:49.405	29	
Ret	28	(Spain) Jordi Carchano	Aprilia	11	Retirement	30	
Ret	48	(Spain) Jorge Lorenzo	Derbi	10	Accident	3	
Ret	41	(Japan) Youichi Ui	Aprilia	7	Accident	10	
Ret	38	(Finland) Mikko Kyyhkynen	Honda	6	Accident	32	
Ret	9	(Czech Republic) Markéta Janáková	Honda	6	Accident	31	
Ret	47	(Spain) Ángel Rodríguez	Derbi	1	Retirement	25	
Ret	32	(Italy) Fabrizio Lai	Gilera	0	Accident	26	
Ret	33	(Spain) Sergio Gadea	Aprilia	0	Accident	23	

== Championship standings after the race (MotoGP) ==
Below are the standings for the top five riders and constructors after round seven has concluded.

Riders' Championship standings

Pos.	Rider	Points
1	(Italy) Valentino Rossi	126
2	(Spain) Sete Gibernau	126
3	(Italy) Max Biaggi	113
4	(United States) Colin Edwards	64
5	(Spain) Carlos Checa	62

Constructors' Championship standings

Pos.	Constructor	Points
1	(Japan) Honda	155
2	(Japan) Yamaha	141
3	(Italy) Ducati	67
4	(Japan) Kawasaki	32
5	(Japan) Suzuki	26

- Note: Only the top five positions are included for both sets of standings.

Previous race: 2004 Dutch TT	FIM Grand Prix World Championship; 2004 season	Next race: 2004 German Grand Prix
Previous race: 2003 Rio de Janeiro Grand Prix	Rio de Janeiro motorcycle Grand Prix	Next race: None
