= 2004 German motorcycle Grand Prix =

(Germany) 2004 German Grand Prix
Race details
- Race 8 of 16 races in the 2004 Grand Prix motorcycle racing season
- Date: 18 July 2004
- Official name: Veltins Motorrad Grand Prix Deutschland
- Location: Sachsenring
- Course: Permanent racing facility; 3.671 km (2.281 mi)

MotoGP
Pole position
- Rider: (Italy) Max Biaggi
- Time: 1:22.756
Fastest lap
- Rider: (Brazil) Alex Barros
- Time: 1:24.056 on lap 15
Podium
- First: (Italy) Max Biaggi
- Second: (Brazil) Alex Barros
- Third: (United States) Nicky Hayden

250cc
Pole position
- Rider: (Argentina) Sebastián Porto
- Time: 1:25.078
Fastest lap
- Rider: (Argentina) Sebastián Porto
- Time: 1:25.118 on lap 4
Podium
- First: (Spain) Daniel Pedrosa
- Second: (Argentina) Sebastián Porto
- Third: (San Marino) Alex de Angelis

125cc
Pole position
- Rider: (Italy) Andrea Dovizioso
- Time: 1:27.836
Fastest lap
- Rider: (Spain) Héctor Barberá
- Time: 1:27.680 on lap 3
Podium
- First: (Italy) Roberto Locatelli
- Second: (Spain) Héctor Barberá
- Third: (Spain) Pablo Nieto

The 2004 German motorcycle Grand Prix was the eighth round of the 2004 MotoGP Championship. It took place on the weekend of 16–18 July 2004 at the Sachsenring. This would prove to be Max Biaggi's final victory in the premier class.

== MotoGP classification ==
Pos.	No.	Rider	Team	Manufacturer	Laps	Time/Retired	Grid	Points
1	3	(Italy) Max Biaggi	Camel Honda	Honda	30	42:23.287	1	25
2	4	(Brazil) Alex Barros	Repsol Honda Team	Honda	30	+0.349	6	20
3	69	(United States) Nicky Hayden	Repsol Honda Team	Honda	30	+4.293	9	16
4	46	(Italy) Valentino Rossi	Gauloises Fortuna Yamaha	Yamaha	30	+4.500	2	13
5	45	(United States) Colin Edwards	Telefónica Movistar Honda MotoGP	Honda	30	+16.137	11	11
6	6	(Japan) Makoto Tamada	Camel Honda	Honda	30	+16.482	13	10
7	56	(Japan) Shinya Nakano	Kawasaki Racing Team	Kawasaki	30	+18.477	5	9
8	10	(United States) Kenny Roberts Jr.	Team Suzuki MotoGP	Suzuki	30	+23.335	3	8
9	21	(United States) John Hopkins	Team Suzuki MotoGP	Suzuki	30	+30.705	12	7
10	66	(Germany) Alex Hofmann	Kawasaki Racing Team	Kawasaki	30	+40.540	16	6
11	11	(Spain) Rubén Xaus	D'Antin MotoGP	Ducati	30	+43.712	18	5
12	99	(United Kingdom) Jeremy McWilliams	MS Aprilia Racing	Aprilia	30	+52.791	17	4
13	50	(United Kingdom) Neil Hodgson	D'Antin MotoGP	Ducati	30	+53.690	19	3
14	67	(United Kingdom) Shane Byrne	MS Aprilia Racing	Aprilia	30	+1:13.215	23	2
15	84	(Italy) Michel Fabrizio	WCM	Harris WCM	30	+1:20.050	21	1
16	35	(United Kingdom) Chris Burns	WCM	Harris WCM	29	+1 lap	24	
Ret	80	(United States) Kurtis Roberts	Proton Team KR	Proton KR	26	Retirement	22	
Ret	33	(Italy) Marco Melandri	Fortuna Gauloises Tech 3	Yamaha	20	Accident	14	
Ret	17	(Japan) Norifumi Abe	Fortuna Gauloises Tech 3	Yamaha	20	Accident	15	
Ret	12	(Australia) Troy Bayliss	Ducati Marlboro Team	Ducati	10	Accident	8	
Ret	65	(Italy) Loris Capirossi	Ducati Marlboro Team	Ducati	9	Accident	10	
Ret	15	(Spain) Sete Gibernau	Telefónica Movistar Honda MotoGP	Honda	8	Accident	4	
Ret	7	(Spain) Carlos Checa	Gauloises Fortuna Yamaha	Yamaha	4	Accident	7	
Ret	9	(Japan) Nobuatsu Aoki	Proton Team KR	Proton KR	3	Accident	20	

== 250 cc classification ==
Pos.	No.	Rider	Manufacturer	Laps	Time/Retired	Grid	Points
1	26	(Spain) Daniel Pedrosa	Honda	29	41:37.239	5	25
2	19	(Argentina) Sebastián Porto	Aprilia	29	+4.279	1	20
3	51	(San Marino) Alex de Angelis	Aprilia	29	+16.403	2	16
4	73	(Japan) Hiroshi Aoyama	Honda	29	+16.769	12	13
5	7	(France) Randy de Puniet	Aprilia	29	+16.966	4	11
6	2	(Italy) Roberto Rolfo	Honda	29	+18.135	3	10
7	14	(Australia) Anthony West	Aprilia	29	+32.141	14	9
8	10	(Spain) Fonsi Nieto	Aprilia	29	+32.766	8	8
9	21	(Italy) Franco Battaini	Aprilia	29	+37.726	10	7
10	50	(France) Sylvain Guintoli	Aprilia	29	+38.088	11	6
11	6	(Spain) Alex Debón	Honda	29	+50.782	13	5
12	57	(United Kingdom) Chaz Davies	Aprilia	29	+50.934	17	4
13	11	(Spain) Joan Olivé	Aprilia	29	+1:00.946	16	3
14	34	(France) Eric Bataille	Honda	29	+1:02.410	24	2
15	96	(Czech Republic) Jakub Smrž	Honda	29	+1:02.527	21	1
16	8	(Japan) Naoki Matsudo	Yamaha	29	+1:02.554	9	
17	44	(Japan) Taro Sekiguchi	Yamaha	29	+1:18.235	22	
18	28	(Germany) Dirk Heidolf	Aprilia	29	+1:18.386	15	
19	36	(France) Erwan Nigon	Yamaha	29	+1:21.155	23	
20	16	(Sweden) Johan Stigefelt	Aprilia	29	+1:21.574	26	
21	17	(Germany) Klaus Nöhles	Honda	29	+1:22.048	19	
22	24	(Spain) Toni Elías	Honda	28	+1 lap	7	
Ret	9	(France) Hugo Marchand	Aprilia	19	Retirement	20	
Ret	77	(France) Grégory Lefort	Aprilia	16	Retirement	27	
Ret	12	(France) Arnaud Vincent	Aprilia	12	Retirement	25	
Ret	25	(Italy) Alex Baldolini	Aprilia	11	Retirement	18	
Ret	40	(Italy) Max Sabbatani	Yamaha	8	Retirement	28	
Ret	54	(San Marino) Manuel Poggiali	Aprilia	6	Accident	6	

== 125 cc classification ==
Pos.	No.	Rider	Manufacturer	Laps	Time/Retired	Grid	Points
1	15	(Italy) Roberto Locatelli	Aprilia	27	40:03.511	10	25
2	3	(Spain) Héctor Barberá	Aprilia	27	+0.165	2	20
3	22	(Spain) Pablo Nieto	Aprilia	27	+0.706	5	16
4	34	(Italy) Andrea Dovizioso	Honda	27	+0.715	1	13
5	36	(Finland) Mika Kallio	KTM	27	+1.073	11	11
6	48	(Spain) Jorge Lorenzo	Derbi	27	+1.176	12	10
7	19	(Spain) Álvaro Bautista	Aprilia	27	+1.283	16	9
8	6	(Italy) Mirko Giansanti	Aprilia	27	+1.459	4	8
9	10	(Spain) Julián Simón	Honda	27	+9.636	7	7
10	58	(Italy) Marco Simoncelli	Aprilia	27	+11.821	6	6
11	21	(Germany) Steve Jenkner	Aprilia	27	+17.967	3	5
12	24	(Italy) Simone Corsi	Honda	27	+20.307	14	4
13	42	(Italy) Gioele Pellino	Aprilia	27	+31.798	18	3
14	33	(Spain) Sergio Gadea	Aprilia	27	+31.927	17	2
15	7	(Italy) Stefano Perugini	Gilera	27	+37.556	25	1
16	14	(Hungary) Gábor Talmácsi	Malaguti	27	+37.720	19	
17	52	(Czech Republic) Lukáš Pešek	Honda	27	+37.911	12	
18	12	(Switzerland) Thomas Lüthi	Honda	27	+37.920	26	
19	69	(Denmark) Robbin Harms	Honda	27	+55.350	24	
20	54	(Italy) Mattia Pasini	Aprilia	27	+55.384	23	
21	39	(Germany) Patrick Unger	Aprilia	27	+58.942	29	
22	66	(Finland) Vesa Kallio	Aprilia	27	+59.902	27	
23	20	(Germany) Georg Fröhlich	Honda	27	+1:17.723	33	
24	28	(Spain) Jordi Carchano	Aprilia	27	+1:17.997	30	
25	35	(Czech Republic) Václav Bittman	Honda	27	+1:18.297	35	
26	8	(Italy) Manuel Manna	Malaguti	27	+1:18.550	36	
27	40	(Germany) Manuel Mickan	Honda	26	+1 lap	32	
Ret	41	(Japan) Youichi Ui	Aprilia	23	Accident	8	
Ret	23	(Italy) Gino Borsoi	Aprilia	23	Retirement	9	
Ret	70	(Spain) Julián Miralles	Aprilia	17	Retirement	34	
Ret	25	(Hungary) Imre Tóth	Aprilia	16	Retirement	22	
Ret	32	(Italy) Fabrizio Lai	Gilera	13	Accident	15	
Ret	63	(France) Mike Di Meglio	Aprilia	13	Retirement	20	
Ret	18	(Italy) Simone Sanna	Aprilia	9	Accident	21	
Ret	47	(Spain) Ángel Rodríguez	Derbi	9	Retirement	28	
Ret	16	(Netherlands) Raymond Schouten	Honda	0	Accident	31	
DNS	27	(Australia) Casey Stoner	KTM		Did not start		
DNQ	9	(Czech Republic) Markéta Janáková	Honda		Did not qualify		

== Championship standings after the race (MotoGP) ==
Below are the standings for the top five riders and constructors after round eight has concluded.

Riders' Championship standings

Pos.	Rider	Points
1	(Italy) Valentino Rossi	139
2	(Italy) Max Biaggi	138
3	(Spain) Sete Gibernau	126
4	(Brazil) Alex Barros	79
5	(United States) Colin Edwards	75

Constructors' Championship standings

Pos.	Constructor	Points
1	(Japan) Honda	180
2	(Japan) Yamaha	154
3	(Italy) Ducati	72
4	(Japan) Kawasaki	41
5	(Japan) Suzuki	34

- Note: Only the top five positions are included for both sets of standings.

Previous race: 2004 Rio de Janeiro Grand Prix	FIM Grand Prix World Championship; 2004 season	Next race: 2004 British Grand Prix
Previous race: 2003 German Grand Prix	German motorcycle Grand Prix	Next race: 2005 German Grand Prix
