= 2003 Rio de Janeiro motorcycle Grand Prix =

(Rio de Janeiro (state)) 2003 Rio de Janeiro Grand Prix
Race details
- Race 12 of 16 races in the 2003 Grand Prix motorcycle racing season
- Date: 20 September 2003
- Official name: Cinzano Rio Grand Prix
- Location: Autódromo Internacional Nelson Piquet
- Course: Permanent racing facility; 4.933 km (3.065 mi)

MotoGP
Pole position
| Rider | (Italy) Valentino Rossi | Honda |
| Time | 1:49.038 | |
Fastest lap
| Rider | (Italy) Valentino Rossi | Honda |
| Time | 1:50.453 on lap 10 | |
Podium
| First | (Italy) Valentino Rossi | Honda |
| Second | (Spain) Sete Gibernau | Honda |
| Third | (Japan) Makoto Tamada | Honda |

250cc
Pole position
| Rider | (Spain) Toni Elías | Aprilia |
| Time | 1:53.457 | |
Fastest lap
| Rider | (San Marino) Manuel Poggiali | Aprilia |
| Time | 1:54.215 on lap 7 | |
Podium
| First | (San Marino) Manuel Poggiali | Aprilia |
| Second | (Italy) Roberto Rolfo | Honda |
| Third | (France) Randy de Puniet | Aprilia |

125cc
Pole position
| Rider | (Spain) Daniel Pedrosa | Honda |
| Time | 1:58.052 | |
Fastest lap
| Rider | (Spain) Daniel Pedrosa | Honda |
| Time | 1:58.121 on lap 3 | |
Podium
| First | (Spain) Jorge Lorenzo | Derbi |
| Second | (Australia) Casey Stoner | Aprilia |
| Third | (San Marino) Alex de Angelis | Aprilia |

The 2003 Rio de Janeiro motorcycle Grand Prix was the twelfth round of the 2003 MotoGP Championship. It took place on the weekend of 18–20 September 2003 at Autódromo Internacional Nelson Piquet.

The 125cc race marked the first Grand Prix motorcycle racing victory for a young Jorge Lorenzo.

== MotoGP classification ==
| Pos. | No. | Rider | Team | Manufacturer | Laps | Time/Retired | Grid | Points |
|---|---|---|---|---|---|---|---|---|
| 1 | 46 | (Italy) Valentino Rossi | Repsol Honda | Honda | 24 | 44:36.633 | 1 | 25 |
| 2 | 15 | (Spain) Sete Gibernau | Telefónica Movistar Honda | Honda | 24 | +3.109 | 3 | 20 |
| 3 | 6 | (Japan) Makoto Tamada | Pramac Honda | Honda | 24 | +7.298 | 9 | 16 |
| 4 | 3 | (Italy) Max Biaggi | Camel Pramac Pons | Honda | 24 | +9.235 | 4 | 13 |
| 5 | 69 | (United States) Nicky Hayden | Repsol Honda | Honda | 24 | +11.165 | 7 | 11 |
| 6 | 65 | (Italy) Loris Capirossi | Ducati Marlboro Team | Ducati | 24 | +14.826 | 2 | 10 |
| 7 | 11 | (Japan) Tohru Ukawa | Camel Pramac Pons | Honda | 24 | +17.361 | 8 | 9 |
| 8 | 56 | (Japan) Shinya Nakano | d'Antín Yamaha Team | Yamaha | 24 | +21.239 | 6 | 8 |
| 9 | 7 | (Spain) Carlos Checa | Fortuna Yamaha Team | Yamaha | 24 | +21.522 | 10 | 7 |
| 10 | 12 | (Australia) Troy Bayliss | Ducati Marlboro Team | Ducati | 24 | +22.971 | 5 | 6 |
| 11 | 33 | (Italy) Marco Melandri | Fortuna Yamaha Team | Yamaha | 24 | +32.910 | 16 | 5 |
| 12 | 4 | (Brazil) Alex Barros | Gauloises Yamaha Team | Yamaha | 24 | +40.136 | 11 | 4 |
| 13 | 45 | (United States) Colin Edwards | Alice Aprilia Racing | Aprilia | 24 | +54.099 | 12 | 3 |
| 14 | 41 | (Japan) Noriyuki Haga | Alice Aprilia Racing | Aprilia | 24 | +57.234 | 19 | 2 |
| 15 | 23 | (Japan) Ryuichi Kiyonari | Telefónica Movistar Honda | Honda | 24 | +57.678 | 15 | 1 |
| 16 | 99 | (United Kingdom) Jeremy McWilliams | Proton Team KR | Proton KR | 24 | +1:06.069 | 20 | |
| 17 | 10 | (United States) Kenny Roberts Jr. | Suzuki Grand Prix Team | Suzuki | 24 | +1:09.444 | 18 | |
| 18 | 88 | (Australia) Andrew Pitt | Kawasaki Racing Team | Kawasaki | 24 | +1:22.463 | 21 | |
| 19 | 52 | (Spain) David de Gea | WCM | Harris WCM | 23 | +1 lap | 22 | |
| Ret | 8 | (Australia) Garry McCoy | Kawasaki Racing Team | Kawasaki | 14 | Retirement | 13 | |
| Ret | 9 | (Japan) Nobuatsu Aoki | Proton Team KR | Proton KR | 11 | Retirement | 17 | |
| Ret | 35 | (United Kingdom) Chris Burns | WCM | Harris WCM | 8 | Retirement | 23 | |
| Ret | 19 | (France) Olivier Jacque | Gauloises Yamaha Team | Yamaha | 7 | Retirement | 14 | |
| DNS | 21 | (United States) John Hopkins | Suzuki Grand Prix Team | Suzuki | | Did not start | | |

== 250 cc classification ==
| Pos. | No. | Rider | Manufacturer | Laps | Time/Retired | Grid | Points |
|---|---|---|---|---|---|---|---|
| 1 | 54 | (San Marino) Manuel Poggiali | Aprilia | 22 | 42:09.055 | 2 | 25 |
| 2 | 3 | (Italy) Roberto Rolfo | Honda | 22 | +12.901 | 3 | 20 |
| 3 | 7 | (France) Randy de Puniet | Aprilia | 22 | +12.965 | 4 | 16 |
| 4 | 50 | (France) Sylvain Guintoli | Aprilia | 22 | +25.317 | 7 | 13 |
| 5 | 8 | (Japan) Naoki Matsudo | Yamaha | 22 | +47.468 | 9 | 11 |
| 6 | 33 | (Spain) Héctor Faubel | Aprilia | 22 | +55.694 | 10 | 10 |
| 7 | 11 | (Spain) Joan Olivé | Aprilia | 22 | +58.264 | 14 | 9 |
| 8 | 14 | (Australia) Anthony West | Aprilia | 22 | +58.339 | 16 | 8 |
| 9 | 57 | (United Kingdom) Chaz Davies | Aprilia | 22 | +1:00.193 | 15 | 7 |
| 10 | 34 | (France) Eric Bataille | Honda | 22 | +1:02.606 | 19 | 6 |
| 11 | 6 | (Spain) Alex Debón | Honda | 22 | +1:03.500 | 13 | 5 |
| 12 | 36 | (France) Erwan Nigon | Aprilia | 22 | +1:09.904 | 11 | 4 |
| 13 | 16 | (Sweden) Johan Stigefelt | Aprilia | 22 | +1:14.199 | 17 | 3 |
| 14 | 28 | (Germany) Dirk Heidolf | Aprilia | 22 | +1:14.370 | 20 | 2 |
| 15 | 13 | (Czech Republic) Jaroslav Huleš | Honda | 22 | +1:16.913 | 22 | 1 |
| 16 | 15 | (Germany) Christian Gemmel | Honda | 22 | +1:17.037 | 23 | |
| 17 | 52 | (Czech Republic) Lukáš Pešek | Yamaha | 22 | +1:19.838 | 21 | |
| 18 | 24 | (Spain) Toni Elías | Aprilia | 22 | +1:27.198 | 1 | |
| 19 | 18 | (Netherlands) Henk vd Lagemaat | Honda | 21 | +1 lap | 24 | |
| Ret | 26 | (Italy) Alex Baldolini | Aprilia | 11 | Retirement | 18 | |
| Ret | 9 | (France) Hugo Marchand | Aprilia | 4 | Retirement | 12 | |
| Ret | 10 | (Spain) Fonsi Nieto | Aprilia | 3 | Retirement | 5 | |
| Ret | 5 | (Argentina) Sebastián Porto | Honda | 2 | Accident | 6 | |
| Ret | 21 | (Italy) Franco Battaini | Aprilia | 2 | Accident | 8 | |
| DNS | 98 | (Germany) Katja Poensgen | Honda | | Did not start | | |

== 125 cc classification ==
| Pos. | No. | Rider | Manufacturer | Laps | Time/Retired | Grid | Points |
|---|---|---|---|---|---|---|---|
| 1 | 48 | (Spain) Jorge Lorenzo | Derbi | 21 | 41:51.624 | 5 | 25 |
| 2 | 27 | (Australia) Casey Stoner | Aprilia | 21 | +0.232 | 9 | 20 |
| 3 | 15 | (San Marino) Alex de Angelis | Aprilia | 21 | +0.372 | 2 | 16 |
| 4 | 3 | (Spain) Daniel Pedrosa | Honda | 21 | +0.589 | 1 | 13 |
| 5 | 22 | (Spain) Pablo Nieto | Aprilia | 21 | +0.771 | 14 | 11 |
| 6 | 34 | (Italy) Andrea Dovizioso | Honda | 21 | +0.899 | 3 | 10 |
| 7 | 7 | (Italy) Stefano Perugini | Aprilia | 21 | +1.240 | 6 | 9 |
| 8 | 79 | (Hungary) Gábor Talmácsi | Aprilia | 21 | +3.835 | 4 | 8 |
| 9 | 80 | (Spain) Héctor Barberá | Aprilia | 21 | +4.117 | 7 | 7 |
| 10 | 17 | (Germany) Steve Jenkner | Aprilia | 21 | +15.268 | 8 | 6 |
| 11 | 58 | (Italy) Marco Simoncelli | Aprilia | 21 | +19.087 | 16 | 5 |
| 12 | 23 | (Italy) Gino Borsoi | Aprilia | 21 | +19.445 | 10 | 4 |
| 13 | 1 | (France) Arnaud Vincent | Aprilia | 21 | +19.584 | 11 | 3 |
| 14 | 6 | (Italy) Mirko Giansanti | Aprilia | 21 | +19.673 | 15 | 2 |
| 15 | 12 | (Switzerland) Thomas Lüthi | Honda | 21 | +20.466 | 12 | 1 |
| 16 | 19 | (Spain) Álvaro Bautista | Aprilia | 21 | +27.902 | 20 | |
| 17 | 10 | (Italy) Roberto Locatelli | KTM | 21 | +27.992 | 21 | |
| 18 | 4 | (Italy) Lucio Cecchinello | Aprilia | 21 | +32.727 | 13 | |
| 19 | 36 | (Finland) Mika Kallio | KTM | 21 | +36.138 | 23 | |
| 20 | 33 | (Italy) Stefano Bianco | Gilera | 21 | +40.544 | 26 | |
| 21 | 41 | (Japan) Youichi Ui | Gilera | 21 | +41.610 | 22 | |
| 22 | 24 | (Italy) Simone Corsi | Honda | 21 | +49.980 | 19 | |
| 23 | 88 | (Denmark) Robbin Harms | Aprilia | 21 | +50.136 | 30 | |
| 24 | 32 | (Italy) Fabrizio Lai | Malaguti | 21 | +50.179 | 18 | |
| 25 | 31 | (Spain) Julián Simón | Malaguti | 21 | +55.624 | 24 | |
| 26 | 42 | (Italy) Gioele Pellino | Aprilia | 21 | +1:00.747 | 31 | |
| 27 | 28 | (Italy) Michele Danese | Honda | 21 | +1:52.184 | 32 | |
| Ret | 50 | (Italy) Andrea Ballerini | Honda | 16 | Accident | 28 | |
| Ret | 63 | (France) Mike Di Meglio | Honda | 15 | Retirement | 29 | |
| Ret | 8 | (Japan) Masao Azuma | Honda | 10 | Retirement | 17 | |
| Ret | 26 | (Spain) Emilio Alzamora | Derbi | 6 | Retirement | 25 | |
| Ret | 11 | (Italy) Max Sabbatani | Aprilia | 3 | Retirement | 33 | |
| Ret | 25 | (Hungary) Imre Tóth | Honda | 1 | Retirement | 27 | |

== Championship standings after the race (MotoGP) ==
Below are the standings for the top five riders and constructors after round twelve has concluded.

Riders' Championship standings

| Pos. | Rider | Points |
|---|---|---|
| 1 | (Italy) Valentino Rossi | 262 |
| 2 | (Spain) Sete Gibernau | 211 |
| 3 | (Italy) Max Biaggi | 174 |
| 4 | (Italy) Loris Capirossi | 123 |
| 5 | (Australia) Troy Bayliss | 112 |

Constructors' Championship standings

| Pos. | Constructor | Points |
|---|---|---|
| 1 | (Japan) Honda | 295 |
| 2 | (Italy) Ducati | 171 |
| 3 | (Japan) Yamaha | 132 |
| 4 | (Italy) Aprilia | 63 |
| 5 | (Malaysia) / (United States) Proton KR | 27 |

- Note: Only the top five positions are included for both sets of standings.

| Previous race: 2003 Portuguese Grand Prix | FIM Grand Prix World Championship; 2003 season | Next race: 2003 Pacific Grand Prix |
| Previous race: 2002 Rio de Janeiro Grand Prix | Rio de Janeiro motorcycle Grand Prix | Next race: 2004 Rio de Janeiro Grand Prix |
