= 2004 Dutch TT =

(Netherlands) 2004 Dutch Grand Prix
Race details
- Race 6 of 16 races in the 2004 Grand Prix motorcycle racing season
- Date: 26 June 2004
- Official name: Gauloises TT Assen
- Location: TT Circuit Assen
- Course: Permanent racing facility; 6.027 km (3.745 mi)

MotoGP
Pole position
- Rider: (Italy) Valentino Rossi
- Time: 1:58.758
Fastest lap
- Rider: (Italy) Valentino Rossi
- Time: 1:59.472 on lap 18
Podium
- First: (Italy) Valentino Rossi
- Second: (Spain) Sete Gibernau
- Third: (Italy) Marco Melandri

250cc
Pole position
- Rider: (Argentina) Sebastián Porto
- Time: 2:03.668
Fastest lap
- Rider: (Spain) Daniel Pedrosa
- Time: 2:03.469 on lap 17
Podium
- First: (Argentina) Sebastián Porto
- Second: (Spain) Daniel Pedrosa
- Third: (Spain) Toni Elías

125cc
Pole position
- Rider: (Australia) Casey Stoner
- Time: 2:18.592
Fastest lap
- Rider: (Spain) Jorge Lorenzo
- Time: 2:10.123 on lap 11
Podium
- First: (Spain) Jorge Lorenzo
- Second: (Italy) Roberto Locatelli
- Third: (Australia) Casey Stoner

The 2004 Dutch TT was the sixth round of the 2004 MotoGP Championship. It took place on the weekend of 24–26 June 2004 at the TT Circuit Assen located in Assen, Netherlands.

== MotoGP classification ==
Pos.	No.	Rider	Team	Manufacturer	Laps	Time/Retired	Grid	Points
1	46	(Italy) Valentino Rossi	Gauloises Fortuna Yamaha	Yamaha	19	38:11.831	1	25
2	15	(Spain) Sete Gibernau	Telefónica Movistar Honda MotoGP	Honda	19	+0.456	3	20
3	33	(Italy) Marco Melandri	Fortuna Gauloises Tech 3	Yamaha	19	+9.909	4	16
4	3	(Italy) Max Biaggi	Camel Honda	Honda	19	+10.183	12	13
5	69	(United States) Nicky Hayden	Repsol Honda Team	Honda	19	+10.300	16	11
6	45	(United States) Colin Edwards	Telefónica Movistar Honda MotoGP	Honda	19	+10.801	13	10
7	11	(Spain) Rubén Xaus	D'Antin MotoGP	Ducati	19	+13.705	9	9
8	65	(Italy) Loris Capirossi	Ducati Marlboro Team	Ducati	19	+14.091	15	8
9	7	(Spain) Carlos Checa	Gauloises Fortuna Yamaha	Yamaha	19	+15.159	2	7
10	50	(United Kingdom) Neil Hodgson	D'Antin MotoGP	Ducati	19	+34.066	20	6
11	17	(Japan) Norifumi Abe	Fortuna Gauloises Tech 3	Yamaha	19	+34.414	17	5
12	6	(Japan) Makoto Tamada	Camel Honda	Honda	19	+39.186	8	4
13	66	(Germany) Alex Hofmann	Kawasaki Racing Team	Kawasaki	19	+41.506	11	3
14	21	(United States) John Hopkins	Team Suzuki MotoGP	Suzuki	19	+54.569	10	2
15	99	(United Kingdom) Jeremy McWilliams	MS Aprilia Racing	Aprilia	19	+1:04.761	19	1
16	10	(United States) Kenny Roberts Jr.	Team Suzuki MotoGP	Suzuki	19	+1:22.266	7	
17	35	(United Kingdom) Chris Burns	WCM	Harris WCM	19	+2:00.469	24	
Ret	12	(Australia) Troy Bayliss	Ducati Marlboro Team	Ducati	17	Retirement	14	
Ret	4	(Brazil) Alex Barros	Repsol Honda Team	Honda	10	Accident	6	
Ret	67	(United Kingdom) Shane Byrne	MS Aprilia Racing	Aprilia	8	Retirement	18	
Ret	56	(Japan) Shinya Nakano	Kawasaki Racing Team	Kawasaki	7	Retirement	5	
Ret	9	(Japan) Nobuatsu Aoki	Proton Team KR	Proton KR	7	Retirement	22	
Ret	80	(United States) Kurtis Roberts	Proton Team KR	Proton KR	5	Retirement	23	
Ret	84	(Italy) Michel Fabrizio	WCM	Harris WCM	4	Accident	21	

== 250 cc classification ==
Pos.	No.	Rider	Manufacturer	Laps	Time/Retired	Grid	Points
1	19	(Argentina) Sebastián Porto	Aprilia	18	37:26.576	1	25
2	26	(Spain) Daniel Pedrosa	Honda	18	+2.566	2	20
3	24	(Spain) Toni Elías	Honda	18	+4.038	4	16
4	7	(France) Randy de Puniet	Aprilia	18	+8.024	3	13
5	51	(San Marino) Alex de Angelis	Aprilia	18	+13.596	6	11
6	14	(Australia) Anthony West	Aprilia	18	+20.405	11	10
7	54	(San Marino) Manuel Poggiali	Aprilia	18	+26.477	5	9
8	10	(Spain) Fonsi Nieto	Aprilia	18	+27.302	9	8
9	2	(Italy) Roberto Rolfo	Honda	18	+27.357	7	7
10	73	(Japan) Hiroshi Aoyama	Honda	18	+43.693	14	6
11	25	(Italy) Alex Baldolini	Aprilia	18	+43.945	13	5
12	6	(Spain) Alex Debón	Honda	18	+44.181	10	4
13	8	(Japan) Naoki Matsudo	Yamaha	18	+52.638	15	3
14	34	(France) Eric Bataille	Honda	18	+52.768	19	2
15	57	(United Kingdom) Chaz Davies	Aprilia	18	+52.900	17	1
16	21	(Italy) Franco Battaini	Aprilia	18	+59.865	12	
17	33	(Spain) Héctor Faubel	Aprilia	18	+1:03.776	20	
18	9	(France) Hugo Marchand	Aprilia	18	+1:03.994	23	
19	44	(Japan) Taro Sekiguchi	Yamaha	18	+1:18.056	25	
20	16	(Sweden) Johan Stigefelt	Aprilia	18	+1:18.128	22	
21	17	(Germany) Klaus Nöhles	Honda	18	+2:00.936	28	
22	22	(Spain) Iván Silva	Aprilia	17	+1 lap	27	
Ret	77	(France) Grégory Lefort	Aprilia	8	Retirement	26	
Ret	12	(France) Arnaud Vincent	Aprilia	7	Retirement	18	
Ret	11	(Spain) Joan Olivé	Aprilia	6	Retirement	8	
Ret	50	(France) Sylvain Guintoli	Aprilia	5	Retirement	16	
Ret	36	(France) Erwan Nigon	Yamaha	4	Retirement	24	
Ret	96	(Czech Republic) Jakub Smrž	Honda	1	Retirement	21	
DNQ	59	(Netherlands) Hans Smees	Honda		Did not qualify		
DNQ	61	(Netherlands) Randy Gevers	Aprilia		Did not qualify		
DNQ	58	(Netherlands) Patrick Lakerveld	Yamaha		Did not qualify		
DNQ	60	(Netherlands) Emile Litjens	Aprilia		Did not qualify		
DNQ	40	(Italy) Max Sabbatani	Yamaha		Did not qualify		
DNQ	62	(Netherlands) Jan Roelofs	Yamaha		Did not qualify		

== 125 cc classification ==
Pos.	No.	Rider	Manufacturer	Laps	Time/Retired	Grid	Points
1	48	(Spain) Jorge Lorenzo	Derbi	17	37:13.859	7	25
2	15	(Italy) Roberto Locatelli	Aprilia	17	+0.235	5	20
3	27	(Australia) Casey Stoner	KTM	17	+0.564	1	16
4	34	(Italy) Andrea Dovizioso	Honda	17	+0.606	3	13
5	21	(Germany) Steve Jenkner	Aprilia	17	+3.865	4	11
6	3	(Spain) Héctor Barberá	Aprilia	17	+11.450	13	10
7	58	(Italy) Marco Simoncelli	Aprilia	17	+11.756	14	9
8	22	(Spain) Pablo Nieto	Aprilia	17	+11.764	2	8
9	6	(Italy) Mirko Giansanti	Aprilia	17	+11.913	11	7
10	25	(Hungary) Imre Tóth	Aprilia	17	+29.339	10	6
11	54	(Italy) Mattia Pasini	Aprilia	17	+29.851	21	5
12	63	(France) Mike Di Meglio	Aprilia	17	+30.394	16	4
13	42	(Italy) Gioele Pellino	Aprilia	17	+30.428	27	3
14	7	(Italy) Stefano Perugini	Gilera	17	+39.233	31	2
15	47	(Spain) Ángel Rodríguez	Derbi	17	+39.346	28	1
16	19	(Spain) Álvaro Bautista	Aprilia	17	+39.583	24	
17	14	(Hungary) Gábor Talmácsi	Malaguti	17	+39.777	29	
18	24	(Italy) Simone Corsi	Honda	17	+40.058	8	
19	10	(Spain) Julián Simón	Honda	17	+40.711	12	
20	50	(Italy) Andrea Ballerini	Aprilia	17	+59.377	9	
21	33	(Spain) Sergio Gadea	Aprilia	17	+1:07.555	18	
22	16	(Netherlands) Raymond Schouten	Honda	17	+1:07.715	25	
23	66	(Finland) Vesa Kallio	Aprilia	17	+1:26.749	17	
24	82	(Netherlands) Jarno van der Marel	Honda	17	+1:51.060	19	
25	38	(Finland) Mikko Kyyhkynen	Honda	16	+1 lap	33	
26	79	(Netherlands) Adri den Bekker	Honda	16	+1 lap	32	
27	9	(Czech Republic) Markéta Janáková	Honda	16	+1 lap	30	
Ret	26	(Germany) Dario Giuseppetti	Honda	16	Accident	23	
Ret	8	(Italy) Manuel Manna	Malaguti	16	Accident	22	
Ret	52	(Czech Republic) Lukáš Pešek	Honda	16	Accident	15	
Ret	36	(Finland) Mika Kallio	KTM	15	Retirement	20	
Ret	41	(Japan) Youichi Ui	Aprilia	7	Retirement	6	
Ret	23	(Italy) Gino Borsoi	Aprilia	7	Retirement	26	
DNS	32	(Italy) Fabrizio Lai	Gilera		Did not start		
DNQ	83	(Netherlands) Gert-Jan Kok	Honda		Did not qualify		
DNQ	80	(Netherlands) Mark van Kreij	Honda		Did not qualify		
DNQ	44	(Netherlands) Frank van den Dragt	Honda		Did not qualify		
DNQ	28	(Spain) Jordi Carchano	Aprilia		Did not qualify		

== Championship standings after the race (MotoGP) ==
Below are the standings for the top five riders and constructors after round six has concluded.

Riders' Championship standings

Pos.	Rider	Points
1	(Italy) Valentino Rossi	126
2	(Spain) Sete Gibernau	126
3	(Italy) Max Biaggi	93
4	(Spain) Carlos Checa	56
5	(Italy) Marco Melandri	54

Constructors' Championship standings

Pos.	Constructor	Points
1	(Japan) Yamaha	133
2	(Japan) Honda	130
3	(Italy) Ducati	54
4	(Japan) Kawasaki	25
5	(Japan) Suzuki	17

- Note: Only the top five positions are included for both sets of standings.

Previous race: 2004 Catalan Grand Prix	FIM Grand Prix World Championship; 2004 season	Next race: 2004 Rio de Janeiro Grand Prix
Previous race: 2003 Dutch TT	Dutch TT	Next race: 2005 Dutch TT
