= 2004 Czech Republic motorcycle Grand Prix =

Czech Republic motorcycle Grand Prix

2004 Czech Republic Grand Prix
Race details
- Race 10 of 16 races in the 2004 Grand Prix motorcycle racing season
- Date: 22 August 2004
- Official name: Gauloises Grand Prix České republiky
- Location: Brno Circuit
- Course: Permanent racing facility; 5.403 km (3.357 mi)

MotoGP
Pole position
- Rider: (Spain) Sete Gibernau
- Time: 2:09.782
Fastest lap
- Rider: (Brazil) Alex Barros
- Time: 1:59.302 on lap 6
Podium
- First: (Spain) Sete Gibernau
- Second: (Italy) Valentino Rossi
- Third: (Italy) Max Biaggi

250cc
Pole position
- Rider: (Argentina) Sebastián Porto
- Time: 2:14.261
Fastest lap
- Rider: (Spain) Daniel Pedrosa
- Time: 2:03.332 on lap 17
Podium
- First: (Argentina) Sebastián Porto
- Second: (France) Randy de Puniet
- Third: (Spain) Daniel Pedrosa

125cc
Pole position
- Rider: (Italy) Marco Simoncelli
- Time: 2:24.458
Fastest lap
- Rider: (Germany) Steve Jenkner
- Time: 2:08.891 on lap 9
Podium
- First: (Spain) Jorge Lorenzo
- Second: (Italy) Andrea Dovizioso
- Third: (Italy) Roberto Locatelli

The 2004 Czech Republic motorcycle Grand Prix was the tenth round of the 2004 MotoGP Championship. It took place on the weekend of 20–22 August 2004 at the Brno Circuit located in Brno, Czech Republic.

== MotoGP classification ==
| Pos. | No. | Rider | Team | Manufacturer | Laps | Time/Retired | Grid | Points |
|---|---|---|---|---|---|---|---|---|
| 1 | 15 | (Spain) Sete Gibernau | Telefónica Movistar Honda MotoGP | Honda | 22 | 44:03.480 | 1 | 25 |
| 2 | 46 | (Italy) Valentino Rossi | Gauloises Fortuna Yamaha | Yamaha | 22 | +3.514 | 3 | 20 |
| 3 | 3 | (Italy) Max Biaggi | Camel Honda | Honda | 22 | +4.330 | 8 | 16 |
| 4 | 6 | (Japan) Makoto Tamada | Camel Honda | Honda | 22 | +16.257 | 16 | 13 |
| 5 | 65 | (Italy) Loris Capirossi | Ducati Marlboro Team | Ducati | 22 | +17.930 | 9 | 11 |
| 6 | 7 | (Spain) Carlos Checa | Gauloises Fortuna Yamaha | Yamaha | 22 | +21.181 | 6 | 10 |
| 7 | 45 | (United States) Colin Edwards | Telefónica Movistar Honda MotoGP | Honda | 22 | +22.471 | 5 | 9 |
| 8 | 17 | (Japan) Norifumi Abe | Fortuna Gauloises Tech 3 | Yamaha | 22 | +31.079 | 13 | 8 |
| 9 | 33 | (Italy) Marco Melandri | Fortuna Gauloises Tech 3 | Yamaha | 22 | +31.158 | 11 | 7 |
| 10 | 10 | (United States) Kenny Roberts Jr. | Team Suzuki MotoGP | Suzuki | 22 | +31.625 | 15 | 6 |
| 11 | 50 | (United Kingdom) Neil Hodgson | D'Antin MotoGP | Ducati | 22 | +34.094 | 12 | 5 |
| 12 | 56 | (Japan) Shinya Nakano | Kawasaki Racing Team | Kawasaki | 22 | +54.124 | 23 | 4 |
| 13 | 66 | (Germany) Alex Hofmann | Kawasaki Racing Team | Kawasaki | 22 | +54.288 | 24 | 3 |
| 14 | 99 | (United Kingdom) Jeremy McWilliams | MS Aprilia Racing | Aprilia | 22 | +57.471 | 14 | 2 |
| 15 | 9 | (Japan) Nobuatsu Aoki | Proton Team KR | Proton KR | 22 | +1:18.515 | 20 | 1 |
| 16 | 88 | (Australia) Andrew Pitt | Moriwaki Racing | Moriwaki | 22 | +1:18.691 | 18 | |
| 17 | 84 | (Italy) Michel Fabrizio | WCM | Harris WCM | 22 | +1:53.138 | 17 | |
| Ret | 12 | (Australia) Troy Bayliss | Ducati Marlboro Team | Ducati | 20 | Accident | 4 | |
| Ret | 77 | (United Kingdom) James Ellison | WCM | Harris WCM | 20 | Accident | 22 | |
| Ret | 11 | (Spain) Rubén Xaus | D'Antin MotoGP | Ducati | 19 | Accident | 10 | |
| Ret | 69 | (United States) Nicky Hayden | Repsol Honda Team | Honda | 18 | Accident | 7 | |
| Ret | 4 | (Brazil) Alex Barros | Repsol Honda Team | Honda | 14 | Accident | 2 | |
| Ret | 21 | (United States) John Hopkins | Team Suzuki MotoGP | Suzuki | 12 | Retirement | 19 | |
| Ret | 32 | (Spain) Gregorio Lavilla | Team Suzuki MotoGP | Suzuki | 4 | Retirement | 21 | |
| DNS | 80 | (United States) Kurtis Roberts | Proton Team KR | Proton KR | | Did not start | | |
| DNS | 67 | (United Kingdom) Shane Byrne | MS Aprilia Racing | Aprilia | | Did not start | | |

== 250 cc classification ==
| Pos. | No. | Rider | Manufacturer | Laps | Time/Retired | Grid | Points |
|---|---|---|---|---|---|---|---|
| 1 | 19 | (Argentina) Sebastián Porto | Aprilia | 20 | 42:03.061 | 1 | 25 |
| 2 | 7 | (France) Randy de Puniet | Aprilia | 20 | +4.309 | 11 | 20 |
| 3 | 26 | (Spain) Daniel Pedrosa | Honda | 20 | +10.919 | 13 | 16 |
| 4 | 14 | (Australia) Anthony West | Aprilia | 20 | +13.792 | 12 | 13 |
| 5 | 24 | (Spain) Toni Elías | Honda | 20 | +14.132 | 7 | 11 |
| 6 | 2 | (Italy) Roberto Rolfo | Honda | 20 | +21.170 | 5 | 10 |
| 7 | 73 | (Japan) Hiroshi Aoyama | Honda | 20 | +22.040 | 8 | 9 |
| 8 | 57 | (United Kingdom) Chaz Davies | Aprilia | 20 | +33.426 | 19 | 8 |
| 9 | 54 | (San Marino) Manuel Poggiali | Aprilia | 20 | +48.326 | 17 | 7 |
| 10 | 33 | (Spain) Héctor Faubel | Aprilia | 20 | +1:03.461 | 25 | 6 |
| 11 | 28 | (Germany) Dirk Heidolf | Aprilia | 20 | +1:03.800 | 23 | 5 |
| 12 | 9 | (France) Hugo Marchand | Aprilia | 20 | +1:04.132 | 22 | 4 |
| 13 | 42 | (France) Grégory Leblanc | Aprilia | 20 | +1:04.630 | 27 | 3 |
| 14 | 96 | (Czech Republic) Jakub Smrž | Honda | 20 | +1:10.960 | 16 | 2 |
| 15 | 11 | (Spain) Joan Olivé | Aprilia | 20 | +1:11.432 | 26 | 1 |
| 16 | 8 | (Japan) Naoki Matsudo | Yamaha | 20 | +1:23.168 | 10 | |
| 17 | 16 | (Sweden) Johan Stigefelt | Aprilia | 20 | +1:24.665 | 18 | |
| 18 | 43 | (Czech Republic) Radomil Rous | Yamaha | 20 | +1:33.030 | 24 | |
| 19 | 71 | (Netherlands) Henk van de Lagemaat | Aprilia | 19 | +1 lap | 28 | |
| Ret | 51 | (San Marino) Alex de Angelis | Aprilia | 17 | Accident | 3 | |
| Ret | 17 | (Germany) Klaus Nöhles | Honda | 17 | Accident | 29 | |
| Ret | 50 | (France) Sylvain Guintoli | Aprilia | 15 | Accident | 4 | |
| Ret | 44 | (Japan) Taro Sekiguchi | Yamaha | 15 | Retirement | 30 | |
| Ret | 88 | (Hungary) Gergő Talmácsi | Yamaha | 13 | Retirement | 31 | |
| Ret | 34 | (France) Eric Bataille | Honda | 10 | Accident | 20 | |
| Ret | 10 | (Spain) Fonsi Nieto | Aprilia | 10 | Accident | 2 | |
| Ret | 25 | (Italy) Alex Baldolini | Aprilia | 10 | Accident | 15 | |
| Ret | 36 | (France) Erwan Nigon | Aprilia | 6 | Accident | 21 | |
| Ret | 12 | (France) Arnaud Vincent | Aprilia | 4 | Retirement | 9 | |
| Ret | 21 | (Italy) Franco Battaini | Aprilia | 0 | Accident | 6 | |
| DNS | 27 | (Italy) Valerio Anghetti | Aprilia | 0 | Did not start | 32 | |
| DNS | 6 | (Spain) Alex Debón | Honda | 0 | Did not start | 14 | |

== 125 cc classification ==
| Pos. | No. | Rider | Manufacturer | Laps | Time/Retired | Grid | Points |
|---|---|---|---|---|---|---|---|
| 1 | 48 | (Spain) Jorge Lorenzo | Derbi | 19 | 41:19.475 | 4 | 25 |
| 2 | 34 | (Italy) Andrea Dovizioso | Honda | 19 | +0.036 | 2 | 20 |
| 3 | 15 | (Italy) Roberto Locatelli | Aprilia | 19 | +0.146 | 25 | 16 |
| 4 | 22 | (Spain) Pablo Nieto | Aprilia | 19 | +0.186 | 26 | 13 |
| 5 | 23 | (Italy) Gino Borsoi | Aprilia | 19 | +1.105 | 10 | 11 |
| 6 | 21 | (Germany) Steve Jenkner | Aprilia | 19 | +1.197 | 13 | 10 |
| 7 | 3 | (Spain) Héctor Barberá | Aprilia | 19 | +1.579 | 24 | 9 |
| 8 | 6 | (Italy) Mirko Giansanti | Aprilia | 19 | +1.587 | 14 | 8 |
| 9 | 24 | (Italy) Simone Corsi | Honda | 19 | +12.488 | 7 | 7 |
| 10 | 10 | (Spain) Julián Simón | Honda | 19 | +12.523 | 3 | 6 |
| 11 | 69 | (Denmark) Robbin Harms | Honda | 19 | +15.947 | 12 | 5 |
| 12 | 50 | (Italy) Andrea Ballerini | Aprilia | 19 | +16.087 | 11 | 4 |
| 13 | 19 | (Spain) Álvaro Bautista | Aprilia | 19 | +16.186 | 16 | 3 |
| 14 | 54 | (Italy) Mattia Pasini | Aprilia | 19 | +25.084 | 23 | 2 |
| 15 | 32 | (Italy) Fabrizio Lai | Gilera | 19 | +28.271 | 19 | 1 |
| 16 | 88 | (Austria) Michael Ranseder | KTM | 19 | +28.329 | 18 | |
| 17 | 7 | (Italy) Stefano Perugini | Gilera | 19 | +33.895 | 31 | |
| 18 | 12 | (Switzerland) Thomas Lüthi | Honda | 19 | +37.754 | 21 | |
| 19 | 58 | (Italy) Marco Simoncelli | Aprilia | 19 | +44.541 | 1 | |
| 20 | 26 | (Germany) Dario Giuseppetti | Honda | 19 | +46.827 | 33 | |
| 21 | 45 | (Italy) Lorenzo Zanetti | Aprilia | 19 | +55.405 | 8 | |
| 22 | 89 | (Japan) Tomoyoshi Koyama | Yamaha | 19 | +55.445 | 15 | |
| 23 | 66 | (Finland) Vesa Kallio | Aprilia | 19 | +55.658 | 38 | |
| 24 | 63 | (France) Mike Di Meglio | Aprilia | 19 | +59.020 | 27 | |
| 25 | 20 | (Germany) Georg Fröhlich | Honda | 19 | +1:24.084 | 36 | |
| 26 | 16 | (Netherlands) Raymond Schouten | Honda | 19 | +1:53.072 | 35 | |
| 27 | 87 | (Czech Republic) Patrik Vostárek | Honda | 19 | +2:14.214 | 34 | |
| 28 | 9 | (Czech Republic) Markéta Janáková | Honda | 18 | +1 lap | 32 | |
| Ret | 33 | (Spain) Sergio Gadea | Aprilia | 16 | Retirement | 20 | |
| Ret | 35 | (Czech Republic) Václav Bittman | Honda | 15 | Retirement | 30 | |
| Ret | 28 | (Spain) Jordi Carchano | Aprilia | 15 | Retirement | 29 | |
| Ret | 52 | (Czech Republic) Lukáš Pešek | Honda | 9 | Accident | 9 | |
| Ret | 25 | (Hungary) Imre Tóth | Aprilia | 7 | Retirement | 22 | |
| Ret | 14 | (Hungary) Gábor Talmácsi | Malaguti | 6 | Retirement | 5 | |
| Ret | 36 | (Finland) Mika Kallio | KTM | 4 | Retirement | 17 | |
| Ret | 8 | (Italy) Manuel Manna | Malaguti | 3 | Retirement | 37 | |
| Ret | 27 | (Australia) Casey Stoner | KTM | 1 | Accident | 6 | |
| Ret | 47 | (Spain) Ángel Rodríguez | Derbi | 1 | Accident | 39 | |
| Ret | 42 | (Italy) Gioele Pellino | Aprilia | 1 | Accident | 28 | |

== Championship standings after the race (MotoGP) ==
Below are the standings for the top five riders and constructors after round ten has concluded.

Riders' Championship standings

| Pos. | Rider | Points |
|---|---|---|
| 1 | (Italy) Valentino Rossi | 184 |
| 2 | (Spain) Sete Gibernau | 167 |
| 3 | (Italy) Max Biaggi | 158 |
| 4 | (United States) Colin Edwards | 104 |
| 5 | (Brazil) Alex Barros | 86 |

Constructors' Championship standings

| Pos. | Constructor | Points |
|---|---|---|
| 1 | (Japan) Honda | 225 |
| 2 | (Japan) Yamaha | 199 |
| 3 | (Italy) Ducati | 94 |
| 4 | (Japan) Suzuki | 48 |
| 5 | (Japan) Kawasaki | 46 |

- Note: Only the top five positions are included for both sets of standings.

| Previous race: 2004 British Grand Prix | FIM Grand Prix World Championship; 2004 season | Next race: 2004 Portuguese Grand Prix |
| Previous race: 2003 Czech Republic Grand Prix | Czech Republic motorcycle Grand Prix | Next race: 2005 Czech Republic Grand Prix |
