= 2004 Italian motorcycle Grand Prix =

(Italy) 2004 Italian Grand Prix
Race details
- Race 4 of 16 races in the 2004 Grand Prix motorcycle racing season
- Date: 6 June 2004
- Official name: Gran Premio Cinzano d'Italia
- Location: Mugello Circuit
- Course: Permanent racing facility; 5.245 km (3.259 mi)

MotoGP
Pole position
- Rider: (Spain) Sete Gibernau
- Time: 1:49.553
Fastest lap
- Rider: (Spain) Sete Gibernau
- Time: 1:51.133 on lap 3 (first part)
Podium
- First: (Italy) Valentino Rossi
- Second: (Spain) Sete Gibernau
- Third: (Italy) Max Biaggi

250cc
Pole position
- Rider: (Argentina) Sebastián Porto
- Time: 1:53.691
Fastest lap
- Rider: (Argentina) Sebastián Porto
- Time: 1:54.599 on lap 21
Podium
- First: (Argentina) Sebastián Porto
- Second: (Spain) Daniel Pedrosa
- Third: (San Marino) Manuel Poggiali

125cc
Pole position
- Rider: (Germany) Steve Jenkner
- Time: 1:58.575
Fastest lap
- Rider: (Spain) Pablo Nieto
- Time: 1:59.400 on lap 3
Podium
- First: (Italy) Roberto Locatelli
- Second: (Australia) Casey Stoner
- Third: (Spain) Héctor Barberá

The 2004 Italian motorcycle Grand Prix was the fourth round of the 2004 MotoGP Championship. It took place on the weekend of 4–6 June 2004 at the Mugello Circuit.

== MotoGP classification ==
The race, scheduled to be run for 23 laps, was stopped after 17 full laps due to rain. It was later restarted for the remaining 6 laps, with the grid determined by the running order before the suspension. The second part of the race determined the final result.

Pos.	No.	Rider	Team	Manufacturer	Laps	Time/Retired	Grid	Points
1	46	(Italy) Valentino Rossi	Gauloises Fortuna Yamaha	Yamaha	6	12:06.803	3	25
2	15	(Spain) Sete Gibernau	Telefónica Movistar Honda MotoGP	Honda	6	+0.361	1	20
3	3	(Italy) Max Biaggi	Camel Honda	Honda	6	+1.540	6	16
4	12	(Australia) Troy Bayliss	Ducati Marlboro Team	Ducati	6	+1.782	15	13
5	11	(Spain) Rubén Xaus	D'Antin MotoGP	Ducati	6	+2.389	14	11
6	4	(Brazil) Alex Barros	Repsol Honda Team	Honda	6	+2.446	4	10
7	17	(Japan) Norifumi Abe	Fortuna Gauloises Tech 3	Yamaha	6	+5.842	16	9
8	65	(Italy) Loris Capirossi	Ducati Marlboro Team	Ducati	6	+6.228	8	8
9	33	(Italy) Marco Melandri	Fortuna Gauloises Tech 3	Yamaha	6	+6.461	5	7
10	67	(United Kingdom) Shane Byrne	MS Aprilia Racing	Aprilia	6	+7.198	17	6
11	50	(United Kingdom) Neil Hodgson	D'Antin MotoGP	Ducati	6	+9.048	19	5
12	45	(United States) Colin Edwards	Telefónica Movistar Honda MotoGP	Honda	6	+9.626	12	4
13	9	(Japan) Nobuatsu Aoki	Proton Team KR	Proton KR	6	+14.201	20	3
14	66	(Germany) Alex Hofmann	Kawasaki Racing Team	Kawasaki	6	+48.091	13	2
15	84	(Italy) Michel Fabrizio	WCM	Harris WCM	6	+50.498	23	1
16	99	(United Kingdom) Jeremy McWilliams	MS Aprilia Racing	Aprilia	6	+56.572	18	
17	88	(Australia) Andrew Pitt	Moriwaki Racing	Moriwaki	6	+59.267	22	
Ret	10	(United States) Kenny Roberts Jr.	Team Suzuki MotoGP	Suzuki	0	Retirement in 1st part	9	
Ret	56	(Japan) Shinya Nakano	Kawasaki Racing Team	Kawasaki	0	Accident in 1st part	10	
Ret	6	(Japan) Makoto Tamada	Camel Honda	Honda	0	Retirement in 1st part	7	
Ret	69	(United States) Nicky Hayden	Repsol Honda Team	Honda	0	Retirement in 1st part	2	
Ret	7	(Spain) Carlos Checa	Gauloises Fortuna Yamaha	Yamaha	0	Accident in 1st part	11	
Ret	80	(United States) Kurtis Roberts	Proton Team KR	Proton KR	0	Retirement in 1st part	21	
DNQ	35	(United Kingdom) Chris Burns	WCM	Harris WCM		Did not qualify		

== 250 cc classification ==
Pos.	No.	Rider	Manufacturer	Laps	Time/Retired	Grid	Points
1	19	(Argentina) Sebastián Porto	Aprilia	21	40:32.672	1	25
2	26	(Spain) Daniel Pedrosa	Honda	21	+6.147	2	20
3	54	(San Marino) Manuel Poggiali	Aprilia	21	+8.415	6	16
4	7	(France) Randy de Puniet	Aprilia	21	+11.226	3	13
5	10	(Spain) Fonsi Nieto	Aprilia	21	+11.876	9	11
6	24	(Spain) Toni Elías	Honda	21	+11.888	4	10
7	2	(Italy) Roberto Rolfo	Honda	21	+24.398	8	9
8	51	(San Marino) Alex de Angelis	Aprilia	21	+27.550	5	8
9	73	(Japan) Hiroshi Aoyama	Honda	21	+28.126	11	7
10	14	(Australia) Anthony West	Aprilia	21	+38.025	16	6
11	11	(Spain) Joan Olivé	Aprilia	21	+38.207	10	5
12	21	(Italy) Franco Battaini	Aprilia	21	+45.788	7	4
13	50	(France) Sylvain Guintoli	Aprilia	21	+1:01.150	15	3
14	33	(Spain) Héctor Faubel	Aprilia	21	+1:06.887	13	2
15	6	(Spain) Alex Debón	Honda	21	+1:07.022	25	1
16	8	(Japan) Naoki Matsudo	Yamaha	21	+1:07.037	14	
17	57	(United Kingdom) Chaz Davies	Aprilia	21	+1:07.196	20	
18	77	(France) Grégory Lefort	Aprilia	21	+1:17.464	21	
19	16	(Sweden) Johan Stigefelt	Aprilia	21	+1:19.655	26	
20	15	(Germany) Christian Gemmel	Honda	21	+1:25.112	27	
21	44	(Japan) Taro Sekiguchi	Yamaha	21	+1:33.088	29	
Ret	63	(Italy) Jarno Ronzoni	Yamaha	15	Accident	28	
Ret	96	(Czech Republic) Jakub Smrž	Honda	11	Accident	12	
Ret	36	(France) Erwan Nigon	Yamaha	10	Retirement	23	
Ret	25	(Italy) Alex Baldolini	Aprilia	8	Accident	18	
Ret	34	(France) Eric Bataille	Honda	8	Accident	19	
Ret	9	(France) Hugo Marchand	Aprilia	8	Retirement	17	
Ret	12	(France) Arnaud Vincent	Aprilia	0	Accident	22	
Ret	28	(Germany) Dirk Heidolf	Aprilia	0	Accident	24	
Ret	40	(Italy) Max Sabbatani	Yamaha	0	Accident	30	

== 125 cc classification ==
Pos.	No.	Rider	Manufacturer	Laps	Time/Retired	Grid	Points
1	15	(Italy) Roberto Locatelli	Aprilia	20	40:13.158	5	25
2	27	(Australia) Casey Stoner	KTM	20	+0.152	2	20
3	3	(Spain) Héctor Barberá	Aprilia	20	+0.197	7	16
4	34	(Italy) Andrea Dovizioso	Honda	20	+0.573	4	13
5	6	(Italy) Mirko Giansanti	Aprilia	20	+0.595	11	11
6	22	(Spain) Pablo Nieto	Aprilia	20	+0.879	12	10
7	21	(Germany) Steve Jenkner	Aprilia	20	+5.980	1	9
8	54	(Italy) Mattia Pasini	Aprilia	20	+19.206	3	8
9	23	(Italy) Gino Borsoi	Aprilia	20	+28.656	19	7
10	48	(Spain) Jorge Lorenzo	Derbi	20	+28.671	8	6
11	24	(Italy) Simone Corsi	Honda	20	+28.717	21	5
12	50	(Italy) Andrea Ballerini	Aprilia	20	+28.831	17	4
13	14	(Hungary) Gábor Talmácsi	Malaguti	20	+28.955	22	3
14	26	(Germany) Dario Giuseppetti	Honda	20	+44.766	34	2
15	52	(Czech Republic) Lukáš Pešek	Honda	20	+44.875	13	1
16	25	(Hungary) Imre Tóth	Aprilia	20	+45.682	27	
17	75	(Italy) Alessio Aldrovandi	Honda	20	+56.328	25	
18	53	(Italy) Stefano Bianco	Aprilia	20	+56.658	32	
19	61	(Italy) Michele Pirro	Aprilia	20	+56.674	36	
20	10	(Spain) Julián Simón	Honda	20	+1:07.291	15	
21	28	(Spain) Jordi Carchano	Aprilia	20	+1:28.660	37	
22	41	(Japan) Youichi Ui	Aprilia	20	+2:29.626	14	
23	33	(Spain) Sergio Gadea	Aprilia	19	+1 lap	33	
Ret	36	(Finland) Mika Kallio	KTM	17	Retirement	6	
Ret	11	(Italy) Mattia Angeloni	Honda	12	Retirement	39	
Ret	19	(Spain) Álvaro Bautista	Aprilia	10	Retirement	18	
Ret	58	(Italy) Marco Simoncelli	Aprilia	8	Accident	16	
Ret	16	(Netherlands) Raymond Schouten	Honda	8	Accident	35	
Ret	66	(Finland) Vesa Kallio	Aprilia	8	Accident	31	
Ret	47	(Spain) Ángel Rodríguez	Derbi	8	Accident	23	
Ret	77	(Italy) Lorenzo Zanetti	Honda	8	Retirement	38	
Ret	42	(Italy) Gioele Pellino	Aprilia	6	Accident	24	
Ret	32	(Italy) Fabrizio Lai	Gilera	6	Accident	10	
Ret	7	(Italy) Stefano Perugini	Gilera	6	Retirement	26	
Ret	63	(France) Mike Di Meglio	Aprilia	2	Accident	9	
Ret	12	(Switzerland) Thomas Lüthi	Honda	2	Accident	20	
Ret	69	(Denmark) Robbin Harms	Honda	0	Accident	30	
Ret	76	(Italy) Michele Danese	Aprilia	0	Accident	28	
Ret	8	(Italy) Manuel Manna	Malaguti	0	Accident	29	

== Championship standings after the race (MotoGP) ==
Below are the standings for the top five riders and constructors after round four has concluded.

Riders' Championship standings

Pos.	Rider	Points
1	(Spain) Sete Gibernau	86
2	(Italy) Valentino Rossi	76
3	(Italy) Max Biaggi	72
4	(Brazil) Alex Barros	48
5	(Spain) Carlos Checa	36

Constructors' Championship standings

Pos.	Constructor	Points
1	(Japan) Honda	90
2	(Japan) Yamaha	83
3	(Italy) Ducati	35
4	(Japan) Suzuki	15
5	(Japan) Kawasaki	13

- Note: Only the top five positions are included for both sets of standings.

Previous race: 2004 French Grand Prix	FIM Grand Prix World Championship; 2004 season	Next race: 2004 Catalan Grand Prix
Previous race: 2003 Italian Grand Prix	Italian motorcycle Grand Prix	Next race: 2005 Italian Grand Prix
