= 2003 Portuguese motorcycle Grand Prix =

(Portugal) 2003 Portuguese Grand Prix
Race details
- Race 11 of 16 races in the 2003 Grand Prix motorcycle racing season
- Date: 7 September 2003
- Official name: Grande Prémio Marlboro de Portugal
- Location: Autódromo do Estoril
- Course: Permanent racing facility; 4.182 km (2.599 mi)

MotoGP
Pole position
Rider	(Italy) Loris Capirossi	Ducati
Time	1:38.412	
Fastest lap
Rider	(Italy) Valentino Rossi	Honda
Time	1:39.189 on lap 3	
Podium
First	(Italy) Valentino Rossi	Honda
Second	(Italy) Max Biaggi	Honda
Third	(Italy) Loris Capirossi	Ducati

250cc
Pole position
Rider	(Spain) Toni Elías	Aprilia
Time	1:42.255	
Fastest lap
Rider	(San Marino) Manuel Poggiali	Aprilia
Time	1:42.215 on lap 5	
Podium
First	(Spain) Toni Elías	Aprilia
Second	(San Marino) Manuel Poggiali	Aprilia
Third	(France) Randy de Puniet	Aprilia

125cc
Pole position
Rider	(San Marino) Alex de Angelis	Aprilia
Time	1:45.580	
Fastest lap
Rider	(Spain) Héctor Barberá	Aprilia
Time	1:46.225 on lap 22	
Podium
First	(Spain) Pablo Nieto	Aprilia
Second	(Spain) Héctor Barberá	Aprilia
Third	(San Marino) Alex de Angelis	Aprilia

The 2003 Portuguese motorcycle Grand Prix was the eleventh round of the 2003 MotoGP Championship. It took place on the weekend of 5–7 September 2003 at the Autódromo do Estoril.

== MotoGP classification ==
Pos.	No.	Rider	Team	Manufacturer	Laps	Time/Retired	Grid	Points
1	46	(Italy) Valentino Rossi	Repsol Honda	Honda	28	46:48.005	3	25
2	3	(Italy) Max Biaggi	Camel Pramac Pons	Honda	28	+2.094	2	20
3	65	(Italy) Loris Capirossi	Ducati Marlboro Team	Ducati	28	+5.254	1	16
4	15	(Spain) Sete Gibernau	Telefónica Movistar Honda	Honda	28	+5.269	4	13
5	11	(Japan) Tohru Ukawa	Camel Pramac Pons	Honda	28	+10.581	10	11
6	12	(Australia) Troy Bayliss	Ducati Marlboro Team	Ducati	28	+14.246	8	10
7	33	(Italy) Marco Melandri	Fortuna Yamaha Team	Yamaha	28	+16.143	11	9
8	7	(Spain) Carlos Checa	Fortuna Yamaha Team	Yamaha	28	+18.083	7	8
9	69	(United States) Nicky Hayden	Repsol Honda	Honda	28	+18.284	15	7
10	6	(Japan) Makoto Tamada	Pramac Honda	Honda	28	+21.815	9	6
11	4	(Brazil) Alex Barros	Gauloises Yamaha Team	Yamaha	28	+24.059	12	5
12	56	(Japan) Shinya Nakano	d'Antín Yamaha Team	Yamaha	28	+27.082	6	4
13	19	(France) Olivier Jacque	Gauloises Yamaha Team	Yamaha	28	+27.651	5	3
14	45	(United States) Colin Edwards	Alice Aprilia Racing	Aprilia	28	+31.505	13	2
15	41	(Japan) Noriyuki Haga	Alice Aprilia Racing	Aprilia	28	+57.118	18	1
16	23	(Japan) Ryuichi Kiyonari	Telefónica Movistar Honda	Honda	28	+1:01.412	19	
17	10	(United States) Kenny Roberts Jr.	Suzuki Grand Prix Team	Suzuki	28	+1:01.542	14	
18	21	(United States) John Hopkins	Suzuki Grand Prix Team	Suzuki	28	+1:06.601	17	
19	99	(United Kingdom) Jeremy McWilliams	Proton Team KR	Proton KR	28	+1:10.958	16	
20	9	(Japan) Nobuatsu Aoki	Proton Team KR	Proton KR	28	+1:11.523	23	
21	88	(Australia) Andrew Pitt	Kawasaki Racing Team	Kawasaki	28	+1:18.550	20	
22	52	(Spain) José David de Gea	WCM	Harris WCM	27	+1 lap	21	
Ret	8	(Australia) Garry McCoy	Kawasaki Racing Team	Kawasaki	26	Retirement	22	
DNS	35	(United Kingdom) Chris Burns	WCM	Harris WCM	0	Did not start	24	

== 250 cc classification ==
Pos.	No.	Rider	Manufacturer	Laps	Time/Retired	Grid	Points
1	24	(Spain) Toni Elías	Aprilia	26	44:37.770	1	25
2	54	(San Marino) Manuel Poggiali	Aprilia	26	+4.731	4	20
3	7	(France) Randy de Puniet	Aprilia	26	+5.987	2	16
4	3	(Italy) Roberto Rolfo	Honda	26	+6.470	7	13
5	5	(Argentina) Sebastián Porto	Honda	26	+25.023	5	11
6	21	(Italy) Franco Battaini	Aprilia	26	+25.273	6	10
7	50	(France) Sylvain Guintoli	Aprilia	26	+27.791	3	9
8	8	(Japan) Naoki Matsudo	Yamaha	26	+27.913	9	8
9	10	(Spain) Fonsi Nieto	Aprilia	26	+43.047	8	7
10	14	(Australia) Anthony West	Aprilia	26	+43.112	11	6
11	6	(Spain) Alex Debón	Honda	26	+44.796	10	5
12	34	(France) Eric Bataille	Honda	26	+1:10.765	12	4
13	33	(Spain) Héctor Faubel	Aprilia	26	+1:11.702	21	3
14	26	(Italy) Alex Baldolini	Aprilia	26	+1:11.714	16	2
15	15	(Germany) Christian Gemmel	Honda	26	+1:13.983	15	1
16	36	(France) Erwan Nigon	Aprilia	26	+1:19.238	20	
17	28	(Germany) Dirk Heidolf	Aprilia	26	+1:36.515	18	
18	66	(Finland) Vesa Kallio	Yamaha	25	+1 lap	25	
19	40	(Spain) Álvaro Molina	Aprilia	25	+1 lap	26	
20	57	(United Kingdom) Chaz Davies	Aprilia	25	+1 lap	14	
21	51	(Sweden) Frederik Watz	Yamaha	25	+1 lap	24	
22	41	(Portugal) Miguel Praia	Yamaha	25	+1 lap	27	
23	18	(Netherlands) Henk vd Lagemaat	Honda	25	+1 lap	28	
Ret	9	(France) Hugo Marchand	Aprilia	10	Retirement	13	
Ret	11	(Spain) Joan Olivé	Aprilia	5	Accident	17	
Ret	96	(Czech Republic) Jakub Smrž	Honda	5	Accident	22	
Ret	52	(Czech Republic) Lukáš Pešek	Yamaha	2	Accident	23	
Ret	98	(Germany) Katja Poensgen	Honda	0	Accident	29	
DNS	16	(Sweden) Johan Stigefelt	Aprilia	0	Did not start	19	

== 125 cc classification ==
Pos.	No.	Rider	Manufacturer	Laps	Time/Retired	Grid	Points
1	22	(Spain) Pablo Nieto	Aprilia	23	41:08.307	5	25
2	80	(Spain) Héctor Barberá	Aprilia	23	+0.022	22	20
3	15	(San Marino) Alex de Angelis	Aprilia	23	+0.308	1	16
4	3	(Spain) Daniel Pedrosa	Honda	23	+0.560	2	13
5	1	(France) Arnaud Vincent	Aprilia	23	+3.326	13	11
6	48	(Spain) Jorge Lorenzo	Derbi	23	+8.143	3	10
7	79	(Hungary) Gábor Talmácsi	Aprilia	23	+8.287	10	9
8	34	(Italy) Andrea Dovizioso	Honda	23	+13.353	8	8
9	24	(Italy) Simone Corsi	Honda	23	+13.574	18	7
10	6	(Italy) Mirko Giansanti	Aprilia	23	+13.869	16	6
11	10	(Italy) Roberto Locatelli	KTM	23	+24.879	23	5
12	32	(Italy) Fabrizio Lai	Malaguti	23	+39.570	25	4
13	8	(Japan) Masao Azuma	Honda	23	+46.623	15	3
14	33	(Italy) Stefano Bianco	Gilera	23	+46.983	17	2
15	19	(Spain) Álvaro Bautista	Aprilia	23	+47.176	21	1
16	60	(Italy) Mattia Angeloni	Honda	23	+47.278	24	
17	93	(Italy) Manuel Manna	Aprilia	23	+47.614	28	
18	70	(Spain) Sergio Gadea	Aprilia	23	+1:22.395	30	
19	26	(Spain) Emilio Alzamora	Derbi	23	+1:25.014	34	
20	81	(Spain) Ismael Ortega	Aprilia	23	+1:25.533	36	
21	11	(Italy) Max Sabbatani	Aprilia	23	+1:26.476	35	
Ret	7	(Italy) Stefano Perugini	Aprilia	13	Accident	4	
Ret	50	(Italy) Andrea Ballerini	Honda	13	Retirement	27	
Ret	17	(Germany) Steve Jenkner	Aprilia	10	Retirement	9	
Ret	78	(Hungary) Péter Lénárt	Honda	7	Retirement	32	
Ret	12	(Switzerland) Thomas Lüthi	Honda	6	Accident	14	
Ret	88	(Denmark) Robbin Harms	Aprilia	5	Retirement	29	
Ret	42	(Italy) Gioele Pellino	Aprilia	4	Accident	26	
Ret	31	(Spain) Julián Simón	Malaguti	4	Retirement	20	
Ret	25	(Hungary) Imre Tóth	Honda	1	Retirement	33	
Ret	23	(Italy) Gino Borsoi	Aprilia	0	Accident	7	
Ret	4	(Italy) Lucio Cecchinello	Aprilia	0	Accident	11	
Ret	69	(Spain) David Bonache	Honda	0	Accident	31	
DNS	41	(Japan) Youichi Ui	Gilera	0	Did not start	12	
DNS	58	(Italy) Marco Simoncelli	Aprilia	0	Did not start	6	
DSQ	36	(Finland) Mika Kallio	KTM	23	(+46.646) (Note: Disqualified due to a weight-related technical infringement.)	19	
DNS	27	(Australia) Casey Stoner	Aprilia		Did not start		

== Championship standings after the race (MotoGP) ==
Below are the standings for the top five riders and constructors after round eleven has concluded.

Riders' Championship standings

Pos.	Rider	Points
1	(Italy) Valentino Rossi	237
2	(Spain) Sete Gibernau	191
3	(Italy) Max Biaggi	161
4	(Italy) Loris Capirossi	113
5	(Australia) Troy Bayliss	106

Constructors' Championship standings

Pos.	Constructor	Points
1	(Japan) Honda	270
2	(Italy) Ducati	161
3	(Japan) Yamaha	124
4	(Italy) Aprilia	60
5	(Malaysia) / (United States) Proton KR	27

- Note: Only the top five positions are included for both sets of standings.

== Notes ==
Previous race: 2003 Czech Republic Grand Prix	FIM Grand Prix World Championship; 2003 season	Next race: 2003 Rio de Janeiro Grand Prix
Previous race: 2002 Portuguese Grand Prix	Portuguese motorcycle Grand Prix	Next race: 2004 Portuguese Grand Prix
