= 2004 Portuguese motorcycle Grand Prix =

(Portugal) 2004 Portuguese Grand Prix
Race details
- Race 11 of 16 races in the 2004 Grand Prix motorcycle racing season
- Date: 5 September 2004
- Official name: Grande Prémio Marlboro de Portugal
- Location: Autódromo do Estoril
- Course: Permanent racing facility; 4.182 km (2.599 mi)

MotoGP
Pole position
- Rider: (Japan) Makoto Tamada
- Time: 1:37.933
Fastest lap
- Rider: (Italy) Valentino Rossi
- Time: 1:38.423 on lap 4
Podium
- First: (Italy) Valentino Rossi
- Second: (Japan) Makoto Tamada
- Third: (Brazil) Alex Barros

250cc
Pole position
- Rider: (Spain) Daniel Pedrosa
- Time: 1:41.417
Fastest lap
- Rider: (Spain) Toni Elías
- Time: 1:41.595 on lap 26
Podium
- First: (Spain) Toni Elías
- Second: (Argentina) Sebastián Porto
- Third: (France) Randy de Puniet

125cc
Pole position
- Rider: (Italy) Andrea Dovizioso
- Time: 1:46.280
Fastest lap
- Rider: (Spain) Héctor Barberá
- Time: 1:45.573 on lap 4
Podium
- First: (Spain) Héctor Barberá
- Second: (Finland) Mika Kallio
- Third: (Spain) Jorge Lorenzo

The 2004 Portuguese motorcycle Grand Prix was the eleventh round of the 2004 MotoGP Championship. It took place on the weekend of 3–5 September 2004 at the Autódromo do Estoril.

== MotoGP classification ==
Pos.	No.	Rider	Team	Manufacturer	Laps	Time/Retired	Grid	Points
1	46	(Italy) Valentino Rossi	Gauloises Fortuna Yamaha	Yamaha	28	46:34.911	2	25
2	6	(Japan) Makoto Tamada	Camel Honda	Honda	28	+5.111	1	20
3	4	(Brazil) Alex Barros	Repsol Honda Team	Honda	28	+8.157	5	16
4	15	(Spain) Sete Gibernau	Telefónica Movistar Honda MotoGP	Honda	28	+8.312	3	13
5	7	(Spain) Carlos Checa	Gauloises Fortuna Yamaha	Yamaha	28	+17.966	10	11
6	21	(United States) John Hopkins	Team Suzuki MotoGP	Suzuki	28	+18.631	6	10
7	65	(Italy) Loris Capirossi	Ducati Marlboro Team	Ducati	28	+23.670	11	9
8	12	(Australia) Troy Bayliss	Ducati Marlboro Team	Ducati	28	+25.126	13	8
9	45	(United States) Colin Edwards	Telefónica Movistar Honda MotoGP	Honda	28	+25.611	8	7
10	17	(Japan) Norifumi Abe	Fortuna Gauloises Tech 3	Yamaha	28	+26.727	14	6
11	56	(Japan) Shinya Nakano	Kawasaki Racing Team	Kawasaki	28	+44.704	12	5
12	99	(United Kingdom) Jeremy McWilliams	MS Aprilia Racing	Aprilia	28	+50.511	16	4
13	66	(Germany) Alex Hofmann	Kawasaki Racing Team	Kawasaki	28	+54.372	17	3
14	10	(United States) Kenny Roberts Jr.	Team Suzuki MotoGP	Suzuki	28	+59.518	9	2
15	9	(Japan) Nobuatsu Aoki	Proton Team KR	Proton KR	28	+1:32.853	20	1
16	77	(United Kingdom) James Ellison	WCM	Harris WCM	27	+1 lap	21	
Ret	11	(Spain) Rubén Xaus	D'Antin MotoGP	Ducati	18	Retirement	18	
Ret	50	(United Kingdom) Neil Hodgson	D'Antin MotoGP	Ducati	16	Retirement	15	
Ret	84	(Italy) Michel Fabrizio	MS Aprilia Racing	Aprilia	11	Retirement	19	
Ret	33	(Italy) Marco Melandri	Fortuna Gauloises Tech 3	Yamaha	7	Accident	7	
Ret	3	(Italy) Max Biaggi	Camel Honda	Honda	0	Accident	4	
DNS	35	(United Kingdom) Chris Burns	WCM	Harris WCM		Did not start		

== 250 cc classification ==
Pos.	No.	Rider	Manufacturer	Laps	Time/Retired	Grid	Points
1	24	(Spain) Toni Elías	Honda	26	44:23.399	3	25
2	19	(Argentina) Sebastián Porto	Aprilia	26	+0.323	2	20
3	7	(France) Randy de Puniet	Aprilia	26	+9.918	4	16
4	26	(Spain) Daniel Pedrosa	Honda	26	+9.935	1	13
5	51	(San Marino) Alex de Angelis	Aprilia	26	+21.441	5	11
6	14	(Australia) Anthony West	Aprilia	26	+27.638	11	10
7	54	(San Marino) Manuel Poggiali	Aprilia	26	+27.866	8	9
8	6	(Spain) Alex Debón	Honda	26	+34.673	7	8
9	73	(Japan) Hiroshi Aoyama	Honda	26	+45.923	9	7
10	2	(Italy) Roberto Rolfo	Honda	26	+54.238	14	6
11	33	(Spain) Héctor Faubel	Aprilia	26	+58.751	19	5
12	21	(Italy) Franco Battaini	Aprilia	26	+59.123	10	4
13	34	(France) Eric Bataille	Honda	26	+1:11.620	27	3
14	96	(Czech Republic) Jakub Smrž	Honda	26	+1:11.785	21	2
15	28	(Germany) Dirk Heidolf	Aprilia	26	+1:12.305	17	1
16	57	(United Kingdom) Chaz Davies	Aprilia	26	+1:14.925	16	
17	44	(Japan) Taro Sekiguchi	Yamaha	26	+1:14.982	24	
18	11	(Spain) Joan Olivé	Aprilia	26	+1:22.255	18	
19	9	(France) Hugo Marchand	Aprilia	26	+1:25.071	20	
20	16	(Sweden) Johan Stigefelt	Aprilia	26	+1:26.573	23	
21	36	(France) Erwan Nigon	Aprilia	26	+1:28.740	22	
22	42	(France) Grégory Leblanc	Aprilia	25	+1 lap	26	
23	17	(Germany) Klaus Nöhles	Honda	25	+1 lap	28	
Ret	50	(France) Sylvain Guintoli	Aprilia	24	Retirement	15	
Ret	43	(Czech Republic) Radomil Rous	Yamaha	23	Retirement	29	
Ret	10	(Spain) Fonsi Nieto	Aprilia	21	Retirement	6	
Ret	25	(Italy) Alex Baldolini	Aprilia	3	Accident	12	
Ret	8	(Japan) Naoki Matsudo	Yamaha	2	Retirement	13	
Ret	12	(France) Arnaud Vincent	Aprilia	1	Accident	25	
DNQ	88	(Hungary) Gergő Talmácsi	Yamaha		Did not qualify		

== 125 cc classification ==
Pos.	No.	Rider	Manufacturer	Laps	Time/Retired	Grid	Points
1	3	(Spain) Héctor Barberá	Aprilia	23	41:01.272	10	25
2	36	(Finland) Mika Kallio	KTM	23	+0.151	9	20
3	48	(Spain) Jorge Lorenzo	Derbi	23	+8.824	7	16
4	22	(Spain) Pablo Nieto	Aprilia	23	+8.888	11	13
5	19	(Spain) Álvaro Bautista	Aprilia	23	+9.666	16	11
6	58	(Italy) Marco Simoncelli	Aprilia	23	+10.347	5	10
7	14	(Hungary) Gábor Talmácsi	Malaguti	23	+11.919	15	9
8	52	(Czech Republic) Lukáš Pešek	Honda	23	+11.962	13	8
9	15	(Italy) Roberto Locatelli	Aprilia	23	+19.186	4	7
10	7	(Italy) Stefano Perugini	Gilera	23	+19.548	14	6
11	63	(France) Mike Di Meglio	Aprilia	23	+26.981	23	5
12	32	(Italy) Fabrizio Lai	Gilera	23	+31.708	12	4
13	33	(Spain) Sergio Gadea	Aprilia	23	+32.492	20	3
14	26	(Germany) Dario Giuseppetti	Honda	23	+32.896	26	2
15	23	(Italy) Gino Borsoi	Aprilia	23	+34.820	19	1
16	12	(Switzerland) Thomas Lüthi	Honda	23	+34.845	21	
17	54	(Italy) Mattia Pasini	Aprilia	23	+58.409	18	
18	66	(Finland) Vesa Kallio	Aprilia	23	+1:00.159	27	
19	45	(Italy) Lorenzo Zanetti	Aprilia	23	+1:26.362	29	
20	28	(Spain) Jordi Carchano	Aprilia	23	+1:26.498	31	
21	16	(Netherlands) Raymond Schouten	Honda	23	+1:36.654	32	
22	8	(Italy) Manuel Manna	Malaguti	23	+1:36.716	30	
23	43	(Spain) Manuel Hernández	Aprilia	22	+1 lap	33	
24	9	(Czech Republic) Markéta Janáková	Honda	22	+1 lap	34	
Ret	25	(Hungary) Imre Tóth	Aprilia	14	Retirement	24	
Ret	42	(Italy) Gioele Pellino	Aprilia	12	Retirement	28	
Ret	47	(Spain) Ángel Rodríguez	Derbi	11	Retirement	17	
Ret	34	(Italy) Andrea Dovizioso	Honda	11	Retirement	1	
Ret	27	(Australia) Casey Stoner	KTM	5	Retirement	3	
Ret	24	(Italy) Simone Corsi	Honda	4	Accident	2	
Ret	69	(Denmark) Robbin Harms	Honda	4	Accident	25	
Ret	6	(Italy) Mirko Giansanti	Aprilia	2	Accident	6	
Ret	50	(Italy) Andrea Ballerini	Aprilia	2	Accident	22	
Ret	21	(Germany) Steve Jenkner	Aprilia	0	Accident	8	
DNQ	91	(Switzerland) Vincent Braillard	Honda		Did not qualify		
DNQ	90	(Portugal) Carlos Ferreira	Honda		Did not qualify		
WD	10	(Spain) Julián Simón	Honda		Withdrew		

== Championship standings after the race (MotoGP) ==
Below are the standings for the top five riders and constructors after round eleven has concluded.

Riders' Championship standings

Pos.	Rider	Points
1	(Italy) Valentino Rossi	209
2	(Spain) Sete Gibernau	180
3	(Italy) Max Biaggi	158
4	(United States) Colin Edwards	111
5	(Brazil) Alex Barros	102

Constructors' Championship standings

Pos.	Constructor	Points
1	(Japan) Honda	245
2	(Japan) Yamaha	224
3	(Italy) Ducati	103
4	(Japan) Suzuki	58
5	(Japan) Kawasaki	51

- Note: Only the top five positions are included for both sets of standings.

Previous race: 2004 Czech Republic Grand Prix	FIM Grand Prix World Championship; 2004 season	Next race: 2004 Japanese Grand Prix
Previous race: 2003 Portuguese Grand Prix	Portuguese motorcycle Grand Prix	Next race: 2005 Portuguese Grand Prix
