= 2004 Catalan motorcycle Grand Prix =

(Catalonia) 2004 Catalan Grand Prix
Race details
- Race 5 of 16 races in the 2004 Grand Prix motorcycle racing season
- Date: 13 June 2004
- Official name: Gran Premi Gauloises de Catalunya
- Location: Circuit de Catalunya
- Course: Permanent racing facility; 4.727 km (2.937 mi)

MotoGP
Pole position
- Rider: (Spain) Sete Gibernau
- Time: 1:42.596
Fastest lap
- Rider: (Spain) Sete Gibernau
- Time: 1:44.641 on lap 2
Podium
- First: (Italy) Valentino Rossi
- Second: (Spain) Sete Gibernau
- Third: (Italy) Marco Melandri

250cc
Pole position
- Rider: (France) Randy de Puniet
- Time: 1:46.292
Fastest lap
- Rider: (Spain) Daniel Pedrosa
- Time: 1:47.302 on lap 11
Podium
- First: (France) Randy de Puniet
- Second: (Spain) Daniel Pedrosa
- Third: (Spain) Toni Elías

125cc
Pole position
- Rider: (Spain) Jorge Lorenzo
- Time: 1:50.497
Fastest lap
- Rider: (Spain) Héctor Barberá
- Time: 1:50.903 on lap 4
Podium
- First: (Spain) Héctor Barberá
- Second: (Italy) Andrea Dovizioso
- Third: (Spain) Pablo Nieto

The 2004 Catalan motorcycle Grand Prix was the fifth round of the 2004 MotoGP Championship. It took place on the weekend of 11–13 June 2004 at the Circuit de Catalunya located in Montmeló, Catalonia, Spain.

This race saw the last non-factory rider to lead the championship before Cal Crutchlow in the 2018 Argentine Grand Prix.

== MotoGP classification ==
| Pos. | No. | Rider | Team | Manufacturer | Laps | Time/Retired | Grid | Points |
|---|---|---|---|---|---|---|---|---|
| 1 | 46 | (Italy) Valentino Rossi | Gauloises Fortuna Yamaha | Yamaha | 25 | 44:03.255 | 2 | 25 |
| 2 | 15 | (Spain) Sete Gibernau | Telefónica Movistar Honda MotoGP | Honda | 25 | +0.159 | 1 | 20 |
| 3 | 33 | (Italy) Marco Melandri | Fortuna Gauloises Tech 3 | Yamaha | 25 | +13.923 | 5 | 16 |
| 4 | 7 | (Spain) Carlos Checa | Gauloises Fortuna Yamaha | Yamaha | 25 | +19.213 | 12 | 13 |
| 5 | 45 | (United States) Colin Edwards | Telefónica Movistar Honda MotoGP | Honda | 25 | +21.205 | 11 | 11 |
| 6 | 11 | (Spain) Rubén Xaus | D'Antin MotoGP | Ducati | 25 | +22.847 | 7 | 10 |
| 7 | 56 | (Japan) Shinya Nakano | Kawasaki Racing Team | Kawasaki | 25 | +24.014 | 13 | 9 |
| 8 | 3 | (Italy) Max Biaggi | Camel Honda | Honda | 25 | +24.104 | 4 | 8 |
| 9 | 17 | (Japan) Norifumi Abe | Fortuna Gauloises Tech 3 | Yamaha | 25 | +35.676 | 18 | 7 |
| 10 | 65 | (Italy) Loris Capirossi | Ducati Marlboro Team | Ducati | 25 | +40.775 | 15 | 6 |
| 11 | 66 | (Germany) Alex Hofmann | Kawasaki Racing Team | Kawasaki | 25 | +40.862 | 14 | 5 |
| 12 | 50 | (United Kingdom) Neil Hodgson | D'Antin MotoGP | Ducati | 25 | +56.157 | 17 | 4 |
| 13 | 67 | (United Kingdom) Shane Byrne | MS Aprilia Racing | Aprilia | 25 | +1:03.679 | 20 | 3 |
| 14 | 88 | (Australia) Andrew Pitt | Moriwaki Racing | Moriwaki | 25 | +1:05.933 | 22 | 2 |
| 15 | 9 | (Japan) Nobuatsu Aoki | Proton Team KR | Proton KR | 25 | +1:18.199 | 24 | 1 |
| 16 | 84 | (Italy) Michel Fabrizio | WCM | Harris WCM | 25 | +1:18.515 | 25 | |
| 17 | 10 | (United States) Kenny Roberts Jr. | Team Suzuki MotoGP | Suzuki | 24 | +1 lap | 16 | |
| 18 | 35 | (United Kingdom) Chris Burns | WCM | Harris WCM | 20 | +5 laps | 26 | |
| Ret | 32 | (Spain) Gregorio Lavilla | Team Suzuki MotoGP | Suzuki | 24 | Retirement | 21 | |
| Ret | 12 | (Australia) Troy Bayliss | Ducati Marlboro Team | Ducati | 21 | Accident | 10 | |
| Ret | 21 | (United States) John Hopkins | Team Suzuki MotoGP | Suzuki | 18 | Retirement | 8 | |
| Ret | 69 | (United States) Nicky Hayden | Repsol Honda Team | Honda | 16 | Retirement | 3 | |
| Ret | 6 | (Japan) Makoto Tamada | Camel Honda | Honda | 12 | Retirement | 9 | |
| Ret | 80 | (United States) Kurtis Roberts | Proton Team KR | Proton KR | 5 | Retirement | 23 | |
| Ret | 4 | (Brazil) Alex Barros | Repsol Honda Team | Honda | 4 | Accident | 6 | |
| DNS | 99 | (United Kingdom) Jeremy McWilliams | MS Aprilia Racing | Aprilia | 0 | Did not start | 19 | |

== 250 cc classification ==
| Pos. | No. | Rider | Manufacturer | Laps | Time/Retired | Grid | Points |
|---|---|---|---|---|---|---|---|
| 1 | 7 | (France) Randy de Puniet | Aprilia | 23 | 41:29.955 | 1 | 25 |
| 2 | 26 | (Spain) Daniel Pedrosa | Honda | 23 | +0.109 | 2 | 20 |
| 3 | 24 | (Spain) Toni Elías | Honda | 23 | +9.521 | 5 | 16 |
| 4 | 19 | (Argentina) Sebastián Porto | Aprilia | 23 | +20.871 | 3 | 13 |
| 5 | 10 | (Spain) Fonsi Nieto | Aprilia | 23 | +34.337 | 6 | 11 |
| 6 | 73 | (Japan) Hiroshi Aoyama | Honda | 23 | +37.569 | 13 | 10 |
| 7 | 50 | (France) Sylvain Guintoli | Aprilia | 23 | +42.087 | 7 | 9 |
| 8 | 6 | (Spain) Alex Debón | Honda | 23 | +45.850 | 16 | 8 |
| 9 | 14 | (Australia) Anthony West | Aprilia | 23 | +45.938 | 19 | 7 |
| 10 | 21 | (Italy) Franco Battaini | Aprilia | 23 | +46.235 | 10 | 6 |
| 11 | 34 | (France) Eric Bataille | Honda | 23 | +50.694 | 14 | 5 |
| 12 | 25 | (Italy) Alex Baldolini | Aprilia | 23 | +50.980 | 24 | 4 |
| 13 | 57 | (United Kingdom) Chaz Davies | Aprilia | 23 | +56.785 | 21 | 3 |
| 14 | 8 | (Japan) Naoki Matsudo | Yamaha | 23 | +56.895 | 15 | 2 |
| 15 | 96 | (Czech Republic) Jakub Smrž | Honda | 23 | +57.366 | 18 | 1 |
| 16 | 33 | (Spain) Héctor Faubel | Aprilia | 23 | +58.164 | 20 | |
| 17 | 36 | (France) Erwan Nigon | Yamaha | 23 | +1:32.322 | 22 | |
| 18 | 44 | (Japan) Taro Sekiguchi | Yamaha | 22 | +1 lap | 26 | |
| 19 | 63 | (Italy) Jarno Ronzoni | Honda | 22 | +1 lap | 27 | |
| 20 | 72 | (France) David Fouloi | Aprilia | 22 | +1 lap | 29 | |
| Ret | 2 | (Italy) Roberto Rolfo | Honda | 14 | Accident | 8 | |
| Ret | 54 | (San Marino) Manuel Poggiali | Aprilia | 14 | Accident | 9 | |
| Ret | 51 | (San Marino) Alex de Angelis | Aprilia | 14 | Retirement | 4 | |
| Ret | 11 | (Spain) Joan Olivé | Aprilia | 12 | Accident | 11 | |
| Ret | 77 | (France) Grégory Lefort | Aprilia | 12 | Accident | 12 | |
| Ret | 9 | (France) Hugo Marchand | Aprilia | 7 | Accident | 17 | |
| Ret | 16 | (Sweden) Johan Stigefelt | Aprilia | 7 | Retirement | 23 | |
| Ret | 28 | (Germany) Dirk Heidolf | Aprilia | 6 | Retirement | 25 | |
| DNS | 40 | (Italy) Max Sabbatani | Yamaha | 0 | Did not start | 28 | |
| DNQ | 30 | (Spain) José Luis Cardoso | Yamaha | | Did not qualify | | |

== 125 cc classification ==
| Pos. | No. | Rider | Manufacturer | Laps | Time/Retired | Grid | Points |
|---|---|---|---|---|---|---|---|
| 1 | 3 | (Spain) Héctor Barberá | Aprilia | 22 | 41:17.986 | 2 | 25 |
| 2 | 34 | (Italy) Andrea Dovizioso | Honda | 22 | +0.016 | 8 | 20 |
| 3 | 22 | (Spain) Pablo Nieto | Aprilia | 22 | +0.342 | 4 | 16 |
| 4 | 27 | (Australia) Casey Stoner | KTM | 22 | +0.400 | 3 | 13 |
| 5 | 48 | (Spain) Jorge Lorenzo | Derbi | 22 | +0.548 | 1 | 11 |
| 6 | 19 | (Spain) Álvaro Bautista | Aprilia | 22 | +0.733 | 12 | 10 |
| 7 | 58 | (Italy) Marco Simoncelli | Aprilia | 22 | +7.907 | 13 | 9 |
| 8 | 63 | (France) Mike Di Meglio | Aprilia | 22 | +10.793 | 9 | 8 |
| 9 | 36 | (Finland) Mika Kallio | KTM | 22 | +13.431 | 15 | 7 |
| 10 | 6 | (Italy) Mirko Giansanti | Aprilia | 22 | +13.513 | 7 | 6 |
| 11 | 54 | (Italy) Mattia Pasini | Aprilia | 22 | +14.242 | 17 | 5 |
| 12 | 21 | (Germany) Steve Jenkner | Aprilia | 22 | +14.333 | 10 | 4 |
| 13 | 42 | (Italy) Gioele Pellino | Aprilia | 22 | +16.209 | 21 | 3 |
| 14 | 10 | (Spain) Julián Simón | Honda | 22 | +22.605 | 11 | 2 |
| 15 | 47 | (Spain) Ángel Rodríguez | Derbi | 22 | +22.655 | 27 | 1 |
| 16 | 26 | (Germany) Dario Giuseppetti | Honda | 22 | +22.773 | 22 | |
| 17 | 14 | (Hungary) Gábor Talmácsi | Malaguti | 22 | +22.961 | 14 | |
| 18 | 41 | (Japan) Youichi Ui | Aprilia | 22 | +23.575 | 18 | |
| 19 | 25 | (Hungary) Imre Tóth | Aprilia | 22 | +40.669 | 19 | |
| 20 | 50 | (Italy) Andrea Ballerini | Aprilia | 22 | +42.929 | 24 | |
| 21 | 33 | (Spain) Sergio Gadea | Aprilia | 22 | +51.446 | 26 | |
| 22 | 7 | (Italy) Stefano Perugini | Gilera | 22 | +58.908 | 20 | |
| 23 | 28 | (Spain) Jordi Carchano | Aprilia | 22 | +58.995 | 28 | |
| 24 | 43 | (Spain) Manuel Hernández | Aprilia | 22 | +59.548 | 25 | |
| 25 | 38 | (Finland) Mikko Kyyhkynen | Honda | 22 | +1:17.227 | 30 | |
| 26 | 71 | (Spain) Enrique Jerez | Honda | 22 | +1:36.638 | 34 | |
| 27 | 66 | (Finland) Vesa Kallio | Aprilia | 22 | +1:48.618 | 29 | |
| 28 | 78 | (Spain) Jordi Planas | Honda | 21 | +1 lap | 35 | |
| Ret | 52 | (Czech Republic) Lukáš Pešek | Honda | 21 | Retirement | 5 | |
| Ret | 11 | (Italy) Mattia Angeloni | Honda | 21 | Retirement | 33 | |
| Ret | 15 | (Italy) Roberto Locatelli | Aprilia | 17 | Accident | 6 | |
| Ret | 23 | (Italy) Gino Borsoi | Aprilia | 16 | Retirement | 23 | |
| Ret | 68 | (Argentina) Fabricio Perren | Honda | 12 | Accident | 31 | |
| Ret | 8 | (Italy) Manuel Manna | Malaguti | 4 | Retirement | 32 | |
| Ret | 24 | (Italy) Simone Corsi | Honda | 1 | Accident | 16 | |
| DNS | 32 | (Italy) Fabrizio Lai | Gilera | | Did not start | | |

== Championship standings after the race (MotoGP) ==
Below are the standings for the top five riders and constructors after round five has concluded.

Riders' Championship standings

| Pos. | Rider | Points |
|---|---|---|
| 1 | (Spain) Sete Gibernau | 106 |
| 2 | (Italy) Valentino Rossi | 101 |
| 3 | (Italy) Max Biaggi | 80 |
| 4 | (Spain) Carlos Checa | 49 |
| 5 | (Brazil) Alex Barros | 48 |

Constructors' Championship standings

| Pos. | Constructor | Points |
|---|---|---|
| 1 | (Japan) Honda | 110 |
| 2 | (Japan) Yamaha | 108 |
| 3 | (Italy) Ducati | 45 |
| 4 | (Japan) Kawasaki | 22 |
| 5 | (Japan) Suzuki | 15 |

- Note: Only the top five positions are included for both sets of standings.

| Previous race: 2004 Italian Grand Prix | FIM Grand Prix World Championship; 2004 season | Next race: 2004 Dutch TT |
| Previous race: 2003 Catalan Grand Prix | Catalan motorcycle Grand Prix | Next race: 2005 Catalan Grand Prix |
