= Johan Stigefelt =

Swedish motorcycle racer

- Nationality: Swedish
- Born: 17 March 1976 (age 50); Anderstorp, Sweden
Motorcycle racing career statistics
500cc World Championship
Active years	2001
Manufacturers	Sabre V4
Starts / Wins / Podiums / Poles / F. laps / Points; 15 / 0 / 0 / 0 / 0 / 6
250cc World Championship
Active years	1997–2000, 2003–2004
Manufacturers	Suzuki, Yamaha, TSR-Honda, Aprilia
Starts / Wins / Podiums / Poles / F. laps / Points; 75 / 0 / 0 / 0 / 0 / 92
Supersport World Championship
Active years	2005–2006
Manufacturers	Honda
Starts / Wins / Podiums / Poles / F. laps / Points; 23 / 0 / 0 / 0 / 0 / 128

Johan Stigefelt (born 17 March 1976) is a Swedish former Grand Prix motorcycle road racer and racing team manager.

== Career ==
Born in Anderstorp, Sweden, Stigefelt won the Swedish road racing national championship twice in the 125cc category, in 1994 and 1995. He debuted in Grands Prix in 1997, racing in the 250cc class until 2000. In 2001, he had his only season in the premier class, the 500cc category, finishing 22nd. After two more seasons spent in the 250cc class, Stigefelt moved to the Supersport World Championship in 2005, finishing eighth in 2006.

In 2005, Stigefelt founded the Stiggy Racing team, that competed in the Supersport and Superbike World Championships until 2009. From late 2011 to late 2012, he was the RW Racing GP team manager competing in the Moto3 Championship. His team finished runner-up in 2012 with rider Luis Salom.

Stigefelt was appointed team manager of the Caterham Moto Racing Team for the 2014 Moto2 season and the team finished sixth in the Championship with rider Johann Zarco. After the Caterham Moto Racing team was disbanded, Stigefelt was chosen to manage the Sepang International Circuit’s new Moto3 team known as the SIC Racing Team. In 2015, the team contested the Moto3 Championship with Malaysian rider Zulfahmi Khairuddin and Czech rider Jakub Kornfeil. The SIC Racing Team competed in the 2016 Moto3 season with riders Kornfeil and Adam Norrodin.

== Career statistics ==
=== Grand Prix motorcycle racing ===
==== Races by year ====
(key)

Year	Class	Bike	1	2	3	4	5	6	7	8	9	10	11	12	13	14	15	16	Pos.	Pts
1997	250cc	Suzuki	MAL	JPN	SPA	ITA	AUT	FRA	NED	IMO	GER	BRA; Ret	GBR	CZE	CAT	INA	AUS		NC	0
1998	250cc	Suzuki	JPN; Ret	MAL; Ret	SPA; Ret	ITA; DNS	FRA; Ret	MAD; 12	NED; 15	GBR; 13	GER; Ret	CZE; 16	IMO; 21	CAT; 15	AUS; 11	ARG; 8			21st	22
1999	250cc	Yamaha	MAL; 16	JPN; Ret	SPA; Ret	FRA; Ret	ITA; 12	CAT; Ret	NED; 17	GBR; 18	GER; DSQ	CZE; Ret	IMO; 19	VAL; Ret	AUS; 19	RSA; 17	BRA; 19	ARG; 18	27th	4
2000	250cc	TSR-Honda	RSA; Ret	MAL; 15	JPN; 18	SPA; 13	FRA; 12	ITA; Ret	CAT; 11	NED; 21	GBR; 8	GER; 11	CZE; DNS	POR; DNS	VAL; Ret	BRA; Ret	PAC; 19	AUS; 17	17th	26
2001	500cc	Sabre V4	JPN; Ret	RSA; 18	SPA; 17	FRA; Ret	ITA; Ret	CAT; 17	NED; 18	GBR; 18	GER; Ret	CZE; 15	POR; 13	VAL; 14	PAC; Ret	AUS; 17	MAL; Ret	BRA	22nd	6
2003	250cc	Aprilia	JPN; 14	RSA; 14	SPA; Ret	FRA; 12	ITA; Ret	CAT; 13	NED; 10	GBR; Ret	GER; Ret	CZE; Ret	POR; DNS	BRA; 13	PAC; Ret	MAL; Ret	AUS; 10	VAL; 17	20th	26
2004	250cc	Aprilia	RSA; 23	SPA; 14	FRA; Ret	ITA; 19	CAT; Ret	NED; 20	BRA; Ret	GER; 20	GBR; 14	CZE; 17	POR; 20	JPN; Ret	QAT; 14	MAL; 15	AUS; 9	VAL; 17	22nd	14

=== Supersport World Championship ===
==== Races by year ====
Year	Bike	1	2	3	4	5	6	7	8	9	10	11	12	Pos.	Pts
2005	Honda	QAT	AUS; 6	SPA; 10	ITA; 13	EUR; Ret	SMR; 13	CZE; 11	GBR; 15	NED; 12	GER; 8	ITA; 8	FRA; 6	11th	58
2006	Honda	QAT; 5	AUS; 7	SPA; Ret	ITA; 8	EUR; 9	SMR; 9	CZE; 6	GBR; 11	NED; Ret	GER; Ret	ITA; 11	FRA; 8	8th	70
