= Gino Borsoi =

Italian motorcycle racer

- Nationality: Italian
Motorcycle racing career statistics
Grand Prix motorcycle racing
Active years	1996 - 2004
First race	1996 125cc Italian Grand Prix
Last race	2004 125cc Valencian Community Grand Prix
Team(s)	Aprilia, Yamaha
Championships	0
Starts / Wins / Podiums / Poles / F. laps / Points; 125 / 0 / 3 / 1 / 2 / 626

Gino Borsoi (born March 11, 1974, in Motta di Livenza, Italy) is a retired Grand Prix motorcycle road racer.

Borsoi is team manager for Pramac Racing. He was formerly the Sporting Director of the Aspar Team.

== Races by year ==
(key) (Races in bold indicate pole position) (Races in italics indicate fastest lap)

Year	Class	Team	1	2	3	4	5	6	7	8	9	10	11	12	13	14	15	16	Final Pos	Pts
1996	125 cc	Aprilia	MAL	INA	JPN	SPA	ITA; 23	FRA	NED	GER	GBR	AUT	CZE	IMO	CAT	BRA	AUS		NC	0
1997	125 cc	Yamaha	MAL; 22	JPN; 15	SPA; 23	ITA; Ret	AUT; Ret	FRA; 12	NED; Ret	IMO; Ret	GER; 8	BRA; 14	GBR; Ret	CZE; Ret	CAT; 16	INA; 12	AUS; Ret		20th	19
1998	125 cc	Aprilia	JPN; Ret	MAL; Ret	SPA; 9	ITA; 6	FRA; Ret	MAD; 16	NED; 11	GBR; 7	GER; Ret	CZE; 14	IMO; Ret	CAT; 20	AUS; 10	ARG; 12			18th	43
1999	125 cc	Aprilia	MAL; 7	JPN; Ret	SPA; 12	FRA; 16	ITA; 10	CAT; 12	NED; 9	GBR; 8	GER; 8	CZE; 9	IMO; Ret	VAL; 6	AUS; 8	RSA; 5	BRA; 5	ARG; 4	10th	106
2000	125 cc	Aprilia	RSA; 10	MAL; 6	JPN; 4	SPA; 19	FRA; 9	ITA; 5	CAT; 3	NED; 11	GBR; Ret	GER; Ret	CZE; 8	POR; 8	VAL; 9	BRA; 7	PAC; 14	AUS; 9	9th	113
2001	125 cc	Aprilia	JPN; 4	RSA; 4	SPA; 3	FRA; 4	ITA; 2	CAT; 18	**NED**; 6	GBR; 8	GER; Ret	CZE; 23	POR; 15	VAL; 5	PAC; 8	AUS; 10	MAL; 5	BRA; 20	6th	130
2002	125 cc	Aprilia	JPN; 10	RSA; 7	SPA; 10	FRA; 10	ITA; 5	CAT; Ret	NED; 13	GBR; Ret	GER; 10	CZE; 9	POR; 7	BRA; 12	PAC; 7	MAL; 19	AUS; Ret	VAL; 10	10th	82
2003	125 cc	Aprilia	JPN; 10	RSA; 11	SPA; 13	FRA; 13	ITA; 8	CAT; 8	NED; 13	GBR; 19	GER; 17	CZE; 8	POR; Ret	BRA; 12	PAC; Ret	MAL; 20	AUS; Ret	VAL; 10	17th	54
2004	125 cc	Aprilia	RSA; 6	SPA; 19	FRA; 11	ITA; 9	CAT; Ret	NED; Ret	BRA; 17	GER; Ret	GBR; 9	CZE; 5	POR; 15	JPN; 11	QAT; 8	MAL; 9	AUS; 7	VAL; 7	12th	79
