= World Championship Motorsports =

Motorcycle racing team

WCM
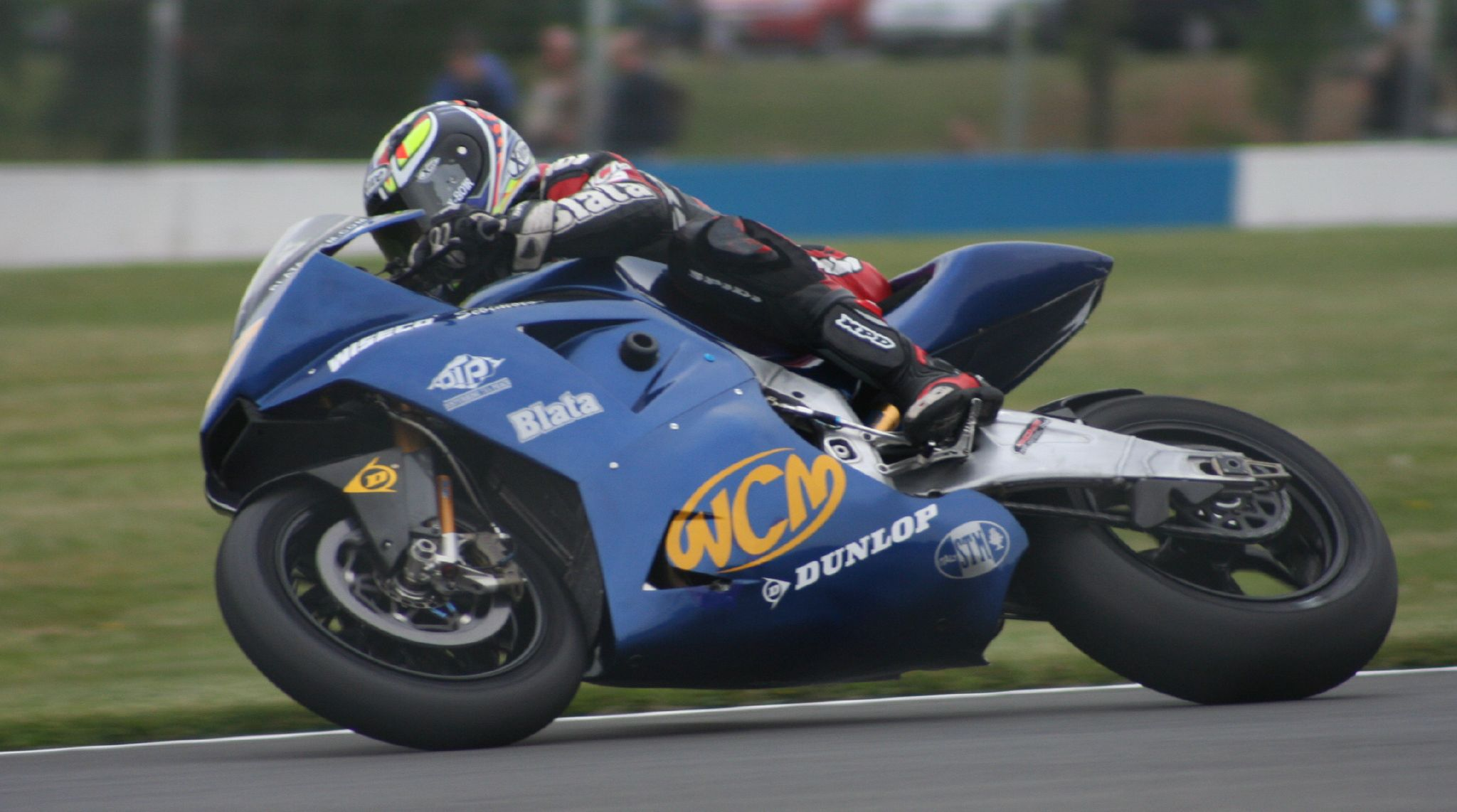
- 2015 name: Worldwide Championship Motorsports
- Base: (United Kingdom) Great Britain
- Principal: Peter Clifford; Bob MacLean
- Rider(s): 27. (Italy) Franco Battaini; 77. (United Kingdom) James Ellison
- Motorcycle: Blata WCM
- Tyres: Dunlop

Worldwide Championship Motorsports (WCM) was a Grand Prix motorcycle racing team formed in 1992 by American Bob MacLean and British Peter Clifford.

The team ran Yamaha motorcycles from 1997 to 2002 and was called Red Bull Yamaha WCM.

== Competition history ==
=== Early years (1992-1996) ===
The partnership began in 1992 when Yamaha made it possible for independent teams like WCM to purchase the YZR engine. The frames were built by ROC, Serge Rosset's company (the motorcycles the team entered were listed as ROC-Yamaha for this reason), and Peter Goddard was the first rider that WCM signed. In the next five seasons riders like Niall Mackenzie, Andrew Stroud, Neil Hodgson and James Haydon rode the ROC-Yamaha bikes for WCM.

=== Yamaha support team (1997-2002) ===
In 1997 the team had a single ROC-Yamaha bike with Kirk McCarthy as rider. However, after the first three races the Promotor-Yamaha team withdrew from the championship. Yamaha invited WCM to take control of the team with two factory-spec YZR500s and riders Luca Cadalora and Troy Corser. WCM gained a Red Bull sponsorship and the team was rebranded as Red Bull Yamaha WCM.

In the 1998 Grand Prix season, WCM rider Simon Crafar scored the only victory of the season for a manufacturer other than Honda, when he won the 1998 British Grand Prix at Donington Park. The following year, WCM rider Régis Laconi won the 1999 500cc Valencia Grand Prix riding a Yamaha YZR500. The team experienced its greatest success in 2000 when rider Garry McCoy won three Grand Prix races; however inconsistent results relegated him to fifth place in the final standings.

For 2002 when the rules changed to allow 4-stroke engines up to 990cc, WCM remained with the old 500cc 2-stroke motorcycles. Garry McCoy and John Hopkins raced for the team.

=== Independent team (2003-2005) ===
Following the team's poor performance during the 2002 season and a lack of customer engines available to lease out, Yamaha pulled their support for the 2003 season. Peter Clifford would seek a customer version of Honda's potent RC211V V5 engines, and proposed that the team pair them with a Moriwaki chassis. However, Red Bull rejected the plan and left the team to sponsor KTM in the 125cc World Championship, instead.

Left with no title sponsor and no machinery, WCM joined forces with Harris Performance Products and renamed the team as Harris WCM. The new team quickly built their own 4-stroke MotoGP racer with an engine based on the Yamaha YZF-R1 engine. After initially talking with Regis Laconi, Steve Hislop, Jose Luis Cardano and Jay Vincent, the team eventually announced Chris Burns and Ralf Waldmann as their riders for the upcoming 2003 season. Waldmann quickly left the fold, following a single test session, citing difficulties in adapting to 4-stroke motorcycles. José David de Gea was later named as Waldmann's replacement.

The team experienced a shaky start to the 2003 season. After being forced to sit out the Japanese GP due to engine-related issues, the FIM found that the motorcycle was not in conformity with the championship technical regulations the following race and the team was disqualified. The team appealed but the International Disciplinary Court turned the appeal down. The team took their case to the Court of Arbitration for Sport (the final stage in the appeal process) but the court again ruled in FIM's favour. Following the court's decision the team entered the British, German and the Czech Republic Grand Prix using 1993 2-stroke 500cc Yamaha-engined motorcycles while they continued to develop their 4-stroke machine; the races where WCM ran the 2-stroke 500cc Yamaha motorcycles marked the last starts of the 2-stroke 500cc bikes in MotoGP. The Harris WCM four-stroke motorcycle was completed in time for them to enter the Portuguese Grand Prix.

For 2004, Chris Burns was joined by Michel Fabrizio as the team riders. Following an injury mid-season Burns was replaced by James Ellison while Youichi Ui replaced Fabrizio following Fabrizio's one race ride for Aprilia at the Portuguese Grand Prix.

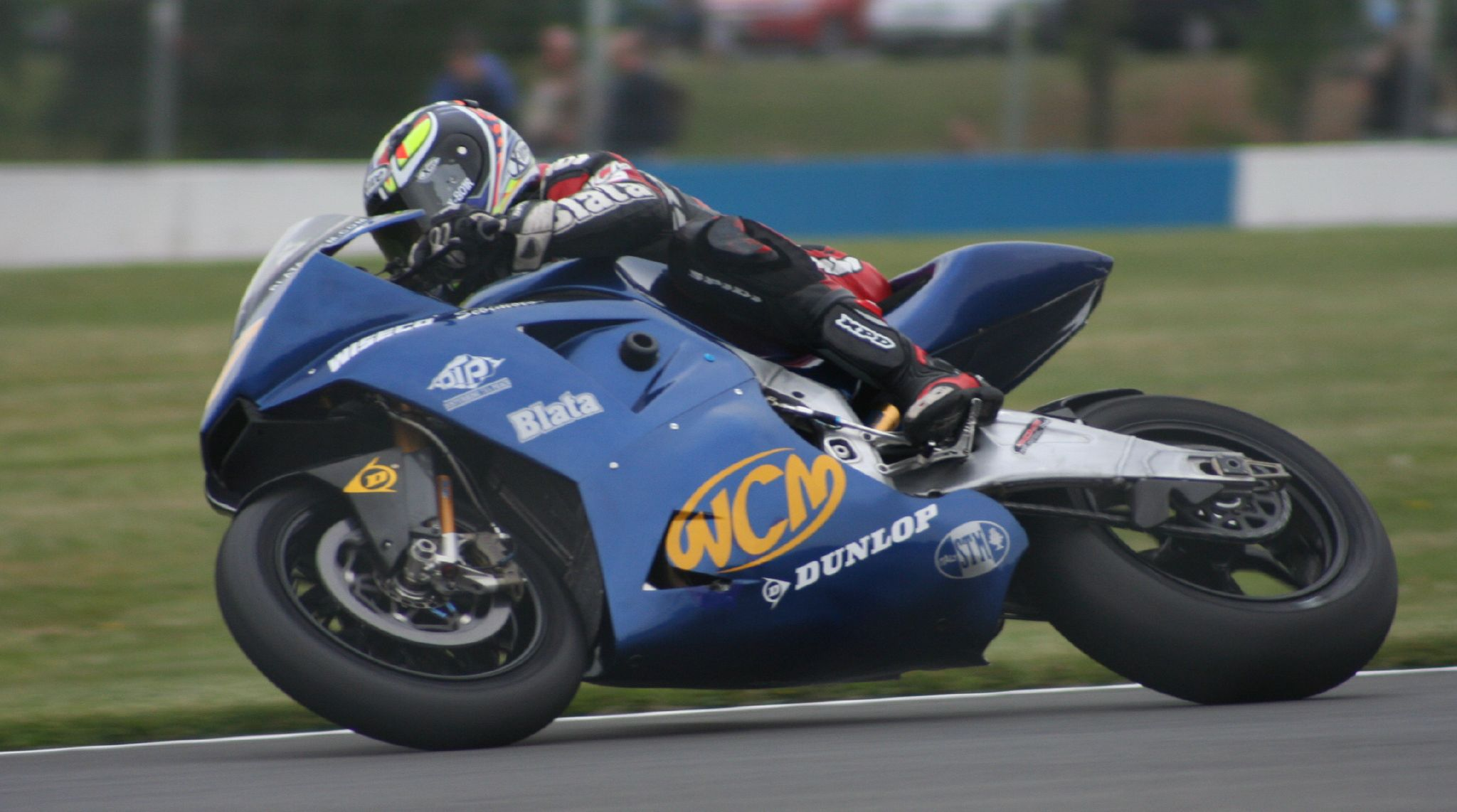
Ellison at the 2005 British Grand Prix

Halfway through the 2004 season WCM announced that it joined forces with Blata to run a V6 machine for 2005. The team was renamed Blata WCM in order to reflect their new sponsor. James Ellison and Franco Battaini were brought in as team riders. The new motorcycle was not ready at the start of the season and the team continued using their Harris WCM motorcycle from the previous two years. The new V6 motorcycle was due to make its debut at Czech Republic Grand Prix but it was not ready. Blata said that the bike would be completed, but announcements died down shortly after this and the motorcycle never raced.

In a 2009 interview, Peter Clifford revealed that Blata only managed to produce "a lump which represented 90% of one motorcycle, but the engine never ran even on a dyno." In the same interview, Clifford also claimed that he was in the process of taking Blata to court. In 2023, Clifford provided an update to confirm that WCM had lost their case against Blata:

"We lost because the judge said it wasn't clear which WCM company made the agreement with Blata. We had two separate racing companies, one based in the USA and one in Ireland." - Peter Clifford explaining his court case loss against Blata.

=== Attempts to return (2006-2007) ===
Faced with the upcoming rule change in 2007, where the engine displacement was to be reduced from 990cc to 800cc, and a lack of faith in Blata producing their promised V6 engine, WCM were left with a difficult decision to make for 2006. They could either continue to run their underdeveloped V4 engines for a fourth consecutive year, with the hope that their V6 project is finally completed in time to run a limited number of races before the rule change, or seek a new source of engines.

At the end of 2005, WCM director Peter Clifford announced his intention to run KTM engines in 2006, with Jeremy McWilliams and Alex Hofmann being named as potential riders. Clifford presented conflicting statements on whether the team would be receiving official support from KTM, or simply using leftover engines from the failed 2005 Proton KR-KTM collaboration project. In addition to receiving engines from KTM, WCM would also be pairing with Italian manufacturer Bimota, who would build the chassis. The provisional entry list for 2006 listed WCM with Bimota engines and Jeremy McWilliams and Jason Perez as riders.

Negotiations eventually broke down once it became clear WCM wouldn't be able to make enough of a financial contribution towards the supply of electronics and development of the engine. The team was missing from the final entry list as they dropped out of the championship.

In June 2006, WCM and Winona Racing announced a strategic partnership to run a 250cc World Championship team in 2007 while WCM also planned a 2007 MotoGP return. The team did not race in 2007 after the team's principal sponsor failed to deliver funding in time, and has not made further attempts to return since.

Other notable WCM riders were John Hopkins, Noriyuki Haga and Alex Hofmann.
