= Mirko Giansanti =

Italian motorcycle racer (1976–2023)

- Born: 14 September 1976; Terni, Italy
- Died: 7 August 2023 (aged 46); Terni, Italy
Motorcycle racing career statistics
Grand Prix motorcycle racing
Active years	1996 - 2005
First race	1996 125cc Nations Grand Prix
Last race	2005 250cc Valencia Grand Prix
Starts / Wins / Podiums / Poles / F. laps / Points; 140 / 0 / 12 / 0 / 3 / 744

Mirko Giansanti (14 September 1976 – 7 August 2023) was an Italian Grand Prix motorcycle road racer.

Born in Terni, the son of the motorcycle racer Fosco, Giansanti made his Grand Prix motorcycle racing debut in 1996, as a wild card with the Pileri team. His best year was in 1998 when he finished on the podium four times and finished in sixth place in the 125cc world championship. During his Grand Prix career, he achieved a total of 12 podiums.

Following his 2005 Grand Prix retirement, Giansanti resumed activity in 2008, competing in the Supersport World Championship for three seasons.

== GRT Yamaha ==
In 2016, Giansanti co-founded with Filippo Conti the Giansanti Racing Team, with which he competed in the Supersport World Championship, winning a title in 2015 with Lucas Mahias, and in the Superbike World Championship. He died on 7 August 2023, at the age of 46. The team have a long association with Yamaha motorcycles, including winning the FIM Women's Circuit Racing World Championship in 2026, where Yamaha provided race motorcycles to the entire grid from 2024-2026.

== Career statistics ==
=== FIM Moto2 European Championship ===
==== Races by year ====
(key) (Races in bold indicate pole position) (Races in italics indicate fastest lap)

Year	Bike	1	2	3	4	5	6	7	8	9	10	Pos	Pts
2014	Suter	JER; 12	ARA1; Ret	ARA2; Ret	CAT	ALB	NAV1	NAV2	ALG1	ALG2	VAL	30th	4
