= Naoki Matsudo =

Japanese motorcycle racer

Naoki Matsudo (松戸 直樹, Matsudo Naoki) (born 25 July 1973 in Chiba, Japan) is a Grand Prix motorcycle road racer. He made his debut in Japan in 1997 with the Yamaha team, and now works for Kawasaki.

In 2000, Matsudo completed his first season in the 250cc World Championship, finishing the season in tenth place. In 2001, he finished ninth in the world with 112 points. In 2002, he contracted with the TEAM YAMAHA KURZ, ending the season in tenth place with 92 points. He stayed with the same team for the next few years. In the 2005 MotoGP season, he took part in Japanese Grand Prix as a wild-card rider for Kawasaki Moriwaki. He also works as a test rider for Kawasaki.
