= 2002 Malaysian motorcycle Grand Prix =

(Malaysia) 2002 Malaysian Grand Prix
Race details
- Race 14 of 16 races in the 2002 Grand Prix motorcycle racing season
- Date: 13 October 2002
- Official name: Gauloises Malaysian Motorcycle Grand Prix
- Location: Sepang International Circuit
- Course: Permanent racing facility; 5.543 km (3.444 mi)

MotoGP
Pole position
Rider	(Brazil) Alex Barros	Honda
Time	2:04.487	
Fastest lap
Rider	(Italy) Max Biaggi	Yamaha
Time	2:04.925 on lap 5	
Podium
First	(Italy) Max Biaggi	Yamaha
Second	(Italy) Valentino Rossi	Honda
Third	(Brazil) Alex Barros	Honda

250cc
Pole position
Rider	(Spain) Fonsi Nieto	Aprilia
Time	2:08.067	
Fastest lap
Rider	(Spain) Fonsi Nieto	Aprilia
Time	2:08.858 on lap 2	
Podium
First	(Spain) Fonsi Nieto	Aprilia
Second	(Spain) Toni Elías	Aprilia
Third	(Italy) Roberto Rolfo	Honda

125cc
Pole position
Rider	(France) Arnaud Vincent	Aprilia
Time	2:13.563	
Fastest lap
Rider	(Italy) Lucio Cecchinello	Aprilia
Time	2:13.919 on lap 4	
Podium
First	(France) Arnaud Vincent	Aprilia
Second	(Italy) Lucio Cecchinello	Aprilia
Third	(Spain) Daniel Pedrosa	Honda

The 2002 Malaysian motorcycle Grand Prix was the fourteenth round of the 2002 MotoGP Championship. It took place on the weekend of 11–13 October 2002 at the Sepang International Circuit.

== MotoGP classification ==
Pos.	No.	Rider	Team	Manufacturer	Laps	Time/Retired	Grid	Points
1	3	(Italy) Max Biaggi	Marlboro Yamaha Team	Yamaha	21	44:01.592	2	25
2	46	(Italy) Valentino Rossi	Repsol Honda Team	Honda	21	+0.542	8	20
3	4	(Brazil) Alex Barros	West Honda Pons	Honda	21	+1.572	1	16
4	11	(Japan) Tohru Ukawa	Repsol Honda Team	Honda	21	+2.238	6	13
5	74	(Japan) Daijiro Kato	Fortuna Honda Gresini	Honda	21	+8.475	3	11
6	56	(Japan) Shinya Nakano	Gauloises Yamaha Tech 3	Yamaha	21	+23.000	16	10
7	7	(Spain) Carlos Checa	Marlboro Yamaha Team	Yamaha	21	+24.360	5	9
8	10	(United States) Kenny Roberts Jr.	Telefónica Movistar Suzuki	Suzuki	21	+24.709	12	8
9	65	(Italy) Loris Capirossi	West Honda Pons	Honda	21	+27.669	4	7
10	6	(Japan) Norifumi Abe	Antena 3 Yamaha d'Antín	Yamaha	21	+41.811	11	6
11	33	(Japan) Akira Ryō	Team Suzuki	Suzuki	21	+42.603	18	5
12	99	(United Kingdom) Jeremy McWilliams	Proton Team KR	Proton KR	21	+45.761	7	4
13	17	(Netherlands) Jurgen van den Goorbergh	Kanemoto Racing	Honda	21	+48.316	10	3
14	15	(Spain) Sete Gibernau	Telefónica Movistar Suzuki	Suzuki	21	+1:01.270	15	2
15	8	(Australia) Garry McCoy	Red Bull Yamaha WCM	Yamaha	21	+1:13.096	9	1
16	30	(Spain) José Luis Cardoso	Antena 3 Yamaha d'Antín	Yamaha	21	+1:15.503	21	
17	55	(France) Régis Laconi	MS Aprilia Racing	Aprilia	21	+1:21.513	20	
18	21	(United States) John Hopkins	Red Bull Yamaha WCM	Yamaha	21	+1:42.684	19	
19	84	(Australia) Andrew Pitt	Kawasaki Racing Team	Kawasaki	21	+1:48.156	22	
Ret (20)	9	(Japan) Nobuatsu Aoki	Proton Team KR	Proton KR	18	Retirement	13	
Ret (21)	31	(Japan) Tetsuya Harada	Pramac Honda Racing Team	Honda	11	Retirement	14	
Ret (22)	19	(France) Olivier Jacque	Gauloises Yamaha Tech 3	Yamaha	3	Accident	17	

== 250 cc classification ==
Pos.	No.	Rider	Manufacturer	Laps	Time/Retired	Grid	Points
1	10	(Spain) Fonsi Nieto	Aprilia	20	43:28.624	1	25
2	24	(Spain) Toni Elías	Aprilia	20	+0.412	3	20
3	4	(Italy) Roberto Rolfo	Honda	20	+2.947	6	16
4	9	(Argentina) Sebastián Porto	Yamaha	20	+7.910	8	13
5	21	(Italy) Franco Battaini	Aprilia	20	+8.581	5	11
6	17	(France) Randy de Puniet	Aprilia	20	+8.706	7	10
7	8	(Japan) Naoki Matsudo	Yamaha	20	+19.155	14	9
8	7	(Spain) Emilio Alzamora	Honda	20	+22.459	13	8
9	18	(Malaysia) Shahrol Yuzy	Yamaha	20	+22.694	12	7
10	42	(Spain) David Checa	Aprilia	20	+29.350	11	6
11	27	(Australia) Casey Stoner	Aprilia	20	+36.502	10	5
12	11	(Japan) Haruchika Aoki	Honda	20	+40.016	15	4
13	15	(Italy) Roberto Locatelli	Aprilia	20	+46.558	4	3
14	12	(United Kingdom) Jay Vincent	Honda	20	+49.793	18	2
15	13	(Czech Republic) Jaroslav Huleš	Yamaha	20	+57.200	21	1
16	96	(Czech Republic) Jakub Smrž	Honda	20	+1:02.918	23	
17	19	(United Kingdom) Leon Haslam	Honda	20	+1:02.950	20	
18	28	(Germany) Dirk Heidolf	Aprilia	20	+1:03.369	16	
19	51	(France) Hugo Marchand	Aprilia	20	+1:13.145	17	
Ret (20)	36	(France) Erwan Nigon	Aprilia	14	Retirement	22	
Ret (21)	32	(Spain) Héctor Faubel	Aprilia	9	Accident	19	
Ret (22)	6	(Spain) Alex Debón	Aprilia	8	Accident	9	
Ret (23)	22	(Spain) Raúl Jara	Aprilia	6	Retirement	24	
Ret (24)	3	(Italy) Marco Melandri	Aprilia	2	Retirement	2	

== 125 cc classification ==
Pos.	No.	Rider	Manufacturer	Laps	Time/Retired	Grid	Points
1	21	(France) Arnaud Vincent	Aprilia	18	40:32.656	1	25
2	4	(Italy) Lucio Cecchinello	Aprilia	18	+0.278	7	20
3	26	(Spain) Daniel Pedrosa	Honda	18	+0.345	3	16
4	1	(San Marino) Manuel Poggiali	Gilera	18	+0.813	2	13
5	22	(Spain) Pablo Nieto	Aprilia	18	+3.647	10	11
6	17	(Germany) Steve Jenkner	Aprilia	18	+6.288	4	10
7	36	(Finland) Mika Kallio	Honda	18	+13.020	14	9
8	80	(Spain) Héctor Barberá	Aprilia	18	+13.028	5	8
9	5	(Japan) Masao Azuma	Honda	18	+13.255	9	7
10	15	(San Marino) Alex de Angelis	Aprilia	18	+21.494	19	6
11	16	(Italy) Simone Sanna	Aprilia	18	+25.209	22	5
12	41	(Japan) Youichi Ui	Derbi	18	+30.511	6	4
13	25	(Spain) Joan Olivé	Honda	18	+36.548	16	3
14	12	(Germany) Klaus Nöhles	Honda	18	+45.983	11	2
15	34	(Italy) Andrea Dovizioso	Honda	18	+46.435	17	1
16	6	(Italy) Mirko Giansanti	Honda	18	+46.466	15	
17	31	(Italy) Mattia Angeloni	Gilera	18	+47.101	18	
18	9	(Japan) Noboru Ueda	Honda	18	+47.690	26	
19	23	(Italy) Gino Borsoi	Aprilia	18	+47.724	20	
20	48	(Spain) Jorge Lorenzo	Derbi	18	+48.079	24	
21	77	(Switzerland) Thomas Lüthi	Honda	18	+1:22.654	30	
22	20	(Hungary) Imre Tóth	Honda	18	+1:22.721	28	
23	19	(Italy) Alex Baldolini	Aprilia	18	+1:22.867	32	
24	72	(Germany) Dario Giuseppetti	Honda	18	+1:23.046	29	
25	57	(United Kingdom) Chaz Davies	Aprilia	18	+1:36.014	31	
26	84	(Italy) Michel Fabrizio	Gilera	18	+1:36.792	21	
Ret (27)	42	(Italy) Christian Pistoni	Italjet	16	Retirement	33	
Ret (28)	83	(Australia) Joshua Waters	Honda	15	Accident	34	
Ret (29)	8	(Hungary) Gábor Talmácsi	Honda	6	Retirement	23	
Ret (30)	37	(Italy) Marco Simoncelli	Aprilia	5	Accident	27	
Ret (31)	50	(Italy) Andrea Ballerini	Aprilia	3	Accident	13	
Ret (32)	11	(Italy) Max Sabbatani	Aprilia	2	Accident	8	
Ret (33)	33	(Italy) Stefano Bianco	Aprilia	1	Accident	12	
Ret (34)	7	(Italy) Stefano Perugini	Italjet	1	Retirement	25	

== Championship standings after the race (MotoGP) ==
Below are the standings for the top five riders and constructors after round fourteen has concluded.

Riders' Championship standings

Pos.	Rider	Points
1	(Italy) Valentino Rossi	310
2	(Italy) Max Biaggi	189
3	(Japan) Tohru Ukawa	182
4	(Brazil) Alex Barros	159
5	(Spain) Carlos Checa	136

Constructors' Championship standings

Pos.	Constructor	Points
1	(Japan) Honda	340
2	(Japan) Yamaha	246
3	(Japan) Suzuki	133
4	(Malaysia) / (United States) Proton KR	79
5	(Italy) Aprilia	33

- Note: Only the top five positions are included for both sets of standings.

Previous race: 2002 Pacific Grand Prix	FIM Grand Prix World Championship; 2002 season	Next race: 2002 Australian Grand Prix
Previous race: 2001 Malaysian Grand Prix	Malaysian motorcycle Grand Prix	Next race: 2003 Malaysian Grand Prix
