= 2003 Malaysian motorcycle Grand Prix =

(Malaysia) 2003 Malaysian Grand Prix
Race details
- Race 14 of 16 races in the 2003 Grand Prix motorcycle racing season
- Date: 12 October 2003
- Official name: Marlboro Malaysian Motorcycle Grand Prix
- Location: Sepang International Circuit
- Course: Permanent racing facility; 5.543 km (3.444 mi)

MotoGP
Pole position
Rider	(Italy) Valentino Rossi	Honda
Time	2:02.480	
Fastest lap
Rider	(Italy) Valentino Rossi	Honda
Time	2:03.822 on lap 3	
Podium
First	(Italy) Valentino Rossi	Honda
Second	(Spain) Sete Gibernau	Honda
Third	(Italy) Max Biaggi	Honda

250cc
Pole position
Rider	(Spain) Toni Elías	Aprilia
Time	2:07.535	
Fastest lap
Rider	(Spain) Toni Elías	Aprilia
Time	2:08.566 on lap 6	
Podium
First	(Spain) Toni Elías	Aprilia
Second	(San Marino) Manuel Poggiali	Aprilia
Third	(Spain) Fonsi Nieto	Aprilia

125cc
Pole position
Rider	(Spain) Jorge Lorenzo	Derbi
Time	2:14.403	
Fastest lap
Rider	(Australia) Casey Stoner	Aprilia
Time	2:14.932 on lap 12	
Podium
First	(Spain) Daniel Pedrosa	Honda
Second	(Finland) Mika Kallio	KTM
Third	(Spain) Jorge Lorenzo	Derbi

The 2003 Malaysian motorcycle Grand Prix was the fourteenth round of the 2003 MotoGP Championship. It took place on the weekend of 10–12 October 2003 at the Sepang International Circuit.

== MotoGP classification ==
Pos.	No.	Rider	Team	Manufacturer	Laps	Time/Retired	Grid	Points
1	46	(Italy) Valentino Rossi	Repsol Honda	Honda	21	43:41.457	1	25
2	15	(Spain) Sete Gibernau	Telefónica Movistar Honda	Honda	21	+2.042	7	20
3	3	(Italy) Max Biaggi	Camel Pramac Pons	Honda	21	+7.644	4	16
4	69	(United States) Nicky Hayden	Repsol Honda	Honda	21	+13.733	9	13
5	7	(Spain) Carlos Checa	Fortuna Yamaha Team	Yamaha	21	+13.789	2	11
6	65	(Italy) Loris Capirossi	Ducati Marlboro Team	Ducati	21	+20.567	6	10
7	11	(Japan) Tohru Ukawa	Camel Pramac Pons	Honda	21	+23.449	8	9
8	56	(Japan) Shinya Nakano	d'Antín Yamaha Team	Yamaha	21	+26.740	5	8
9	12	(Australia) Troy Bayliss	Ducati Marlboro Team	Ducati	21	+32.149	11	7
10	6	(Japan) Makoto Tamada	Pramac Honda	Honda	21	+40.556	3	6
11	33	(Italy) Marco Melandri	Fortuna Yamaha Team	Yamaha	21	+43.863	14	5
12	41	(Japan) Noriyuki Haga	Alice Aprilia Racing	Aprilia	21	+44.613	17	4
13	45	(United States) Colin Edwards	Alice Aprilia Racing	Aprilia	21	+54.667	13	3
14	10	(United States) Kenny Roberts Jr.	Suzuki Grand Prix Team	Suzuki	21	+1:02.687	10	2
15	4	(Brazil) Alex Barros	Gauloises Yamaha Team	Yamaha	21	+1:03.006	12	1
16	88	(Australia) Andrew Pitt	Kawasaki Racing Team	Kawasaki	21	+1:06.128	20	
17	99	(United Kingdom) Jeremy McWilliams	Proton Team KR	Proton KR	21	+1:10.916	18	
18	9	(Japan) Nobuatsu Aoki	Proton Team KR	Proton KR	21	+1:11.344	19	
19	8	(Australia) Garry McCoy	Kawasaki Racing Team	Kawasaki	21	+1:17.205	16	
20	43	(Japan) Akira Ryō	Suzuki Grand Prix Team	Suzuki	21	+1:41.315	15	
21	23	(Japan) Ryuichi Kiyonari	Telefónica Movistar Honda	Honda	21	+1:49.094	21	
Ret	52	(Spain) José David de Gea	WCM	Harris WCM	18	Retirement	22	
Ret	35	(United Kingdom) Chris Burns	WCM	Harris WCM	12	Retirement	24	
DNS	19	(France) Olivier Jacque	Gauloises Yamaha Team	Yamaha	0	Did not start	23	

== 250 cc classification ==
Pos.	No.	Rider	Manufacturer	Laps	Time/Retired	Grid	Points
1	24	(Spain) Toni Elías	Aprilia	20	43:15.925	1	25
2	54	(San Marino) Manuel Poggiali	Aprilia	20	+9.931	2	20
3	10	(Spain) Fonsi Nieto	Aprilia	20	+9.942	3	16
4	3	(Italy) Roberto Rolfo	Honda	20	+25.839	10	13
5	7	(France) Randy de Puniet	Aprilia	20	+34.060	5	11
6	21	(Italy) Franco Battaini	Aprilia	20	+36.004	6	10
7	8	(Japan) Naoki Matsudo	Yamaha	20	+49.445	4	9
8	5	(Argentina) Sebastián Porto	Honda	20	+53.955	7	8
9	14	(Australia) Anthony West	Aprilia	20	+57.165	9	7
10	26	(Italy) Alex Baldolini	Aprilia	20	+1:03.700	12	6
11	28	(Germany) Dirk Heidolf	Aprilia	20	+1:04.419	17	5
12	57	(United Kingdom) Chaz Davies	Aprilia	20	+1:06.349	20	4
13	9	(France) Hugo Marchand	Aprilia	20	+1:07.487	14	3
14	11	(Spain) Joan Olivé	Aprilia	20	+1:08.008	18	2
15	13	(Czech Republic) Jaroslav Huleš	Honda	20	+1:18.180	21	1
16	15	(Germany) Christian Gemmel	Honda	20	+1:21.642	19	
17	98	(Germany) Katja Poensgen	Honda	20	+2:08.210	24	
18	18	(Netherlands) Henk vd Lagemaat	Honda	20	+2:13.493	26	
19	81	(China) Shi Zhao Huang	Yamaha	19	+1 lap	25	
Ret	33	(Spain) Héctor Faubel	Aprilia	8	Retirement	15	
Ret	16	(Sweden) Johan Stigefelt	Aprilia	8	Retirement	23	
Ret	6	(Spain) Alex Debón	Honda	8	Retirement	11	
Ret	52	(Czech Republic) Lukáš Pešek	Yamaha	3	Retirement	22	
Ret	34	(France) Eric Bataille	Honda	1	Accident	16	
Ret	36	(France) Erwan Nigon	Aprilia	0	Accident	13	
DNS	50	(France) Sylvain Guintoli	Aprilia	0	Did not start	8	
DNQ	82	(China) Zi Xian He	Yamaha		Did not qualify		

== 125 cc classification ==
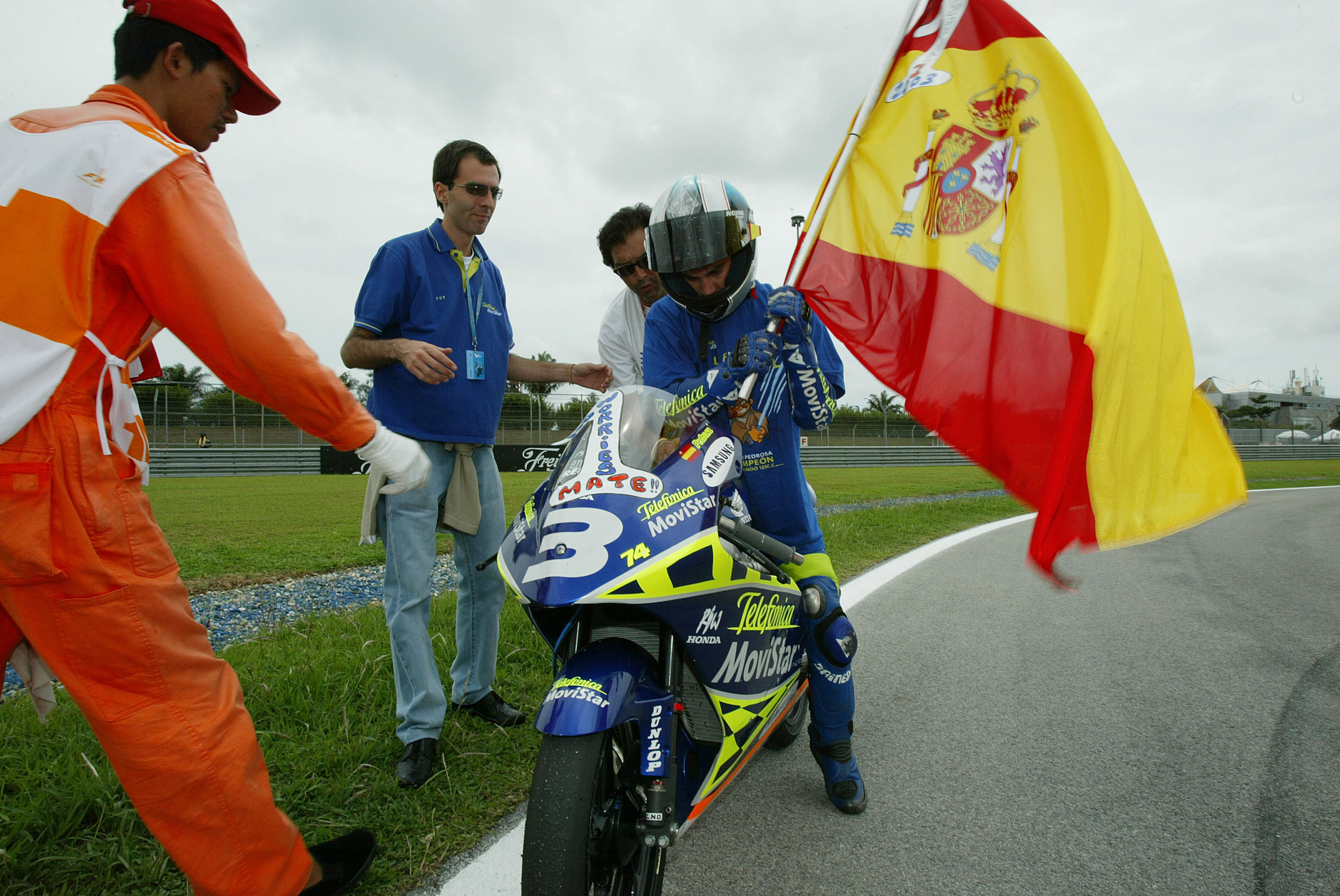
Daniel Pedrosa, celebrating with the Spanish flag after winning the 125cc race.

Pos.	No.	Rider	Manufacturer	Laps	Time/Retired	Grid	Points
1	3	(Spain) Daniel Pedrosa	Honda	19	43:07.647	2	25
2	36	(Finland) Mika Kallio	KTM	19	+2.658	3	20
3	48	(Spain) Jorge Lorenzo	Derbi	19	+2.750	1	16
4	12	(Switzerland) Thomas Lüthi	Honda	19	+3.006	6	13
5	8	(Japan) Masao Azuma	Honda	19	+5.032	12	11
6	15	(San Marino) Alex de Angelis	Aprilia	19	+7.242	16	10
7	6	(Italy) Mirko Giansanti	Aprilia	19	+9.549	11	9
8	80	(Spain) Héctor Barberá	Aprilia	19	+10.908	14	8
9	22	(Spain) Pablo Nieto	Aprilia	19	+11.197	7	7
10	10	(Italy) Roberto Locatelli	KTM	19	+12.874	19	6
11	58	(Italy) Marco Simoncelli	Aprilia	19	+14.926	15	5
12	33	(Italy) Stefano Bianco	Gilera	19	+15.443	10	4
13	34	(Italy) Andrea Dovizioso	Honda	19	+15.576	8	3
14	79	(Hungary) Gábor Talmácsi	Aprilia	19	+22.889	17	2
15	19	(Spain) Álvaro Bautista	Aprilia	19	+24.161	21	1
16	1	(France) Arnaud Vincent	Aprilia	19	+24.266	18	
17	32	(Italy) Fabrizio Lai	Malaguti	19	+24.860	13	
18	41	(Japan) Youichi Ui	Gilera	19	+27.972	23	
19	50	(Italy) Andrea Ballerini	Honda	19	+47.813	24	
20	23	(Italy) Gino Borsoi	Aprilia	19	+48.612	20	
21	88	(Denmark) Robbin Harms	Aprilia	19	+58.448	27	
22	63	(France) Mike Di Meglio	Honda	19	+58.474	26	
23	26	(Spain) Emilio Alzamora	Derbi	19	+1:25.522	29	
24	25	(Hungary) Imre Tóth	Honda	19	+1:25.560	28	
25	31	(Spain) Julián Simón	Malaguti	19	+1:25.881	30	
26	28	(Italy) Michele Danese	Honda	19	+2:10.497	32	
Ret	4	(Italy) Lucio Cecchinello	Aprilia	15	Accident	22	
Ret	27	(Australia) Casey Stoner	Aprilia	12	Accident	4	
Ret	17	(Germany) Steve Jenkner	Aprilia	12	Retirement	5	
Ret	11	(Italy) Max Sabbatani	Aprilia	4	Retirement	31	
Ret	7	(Italy) Stefano Perugini	Aprilia	3	Retirement	9	
Ret	42	(Italy) Gioele Pellino	Aprilia	3	Retirement	25	
DNS	24	(Italy) Simone Corsi	Honda		Did not start		

== Championship standings after the race (MotoGP) ==
Below are the standings for the top five riders and constructors after round fourteen has concluded.

Riders' Championship standings

Pos.	Rider	Points
1	(Italy) Valentino Rossi	307
2	(Spain) Sete Gibernau	244
3	(Italy) Max Biaggi	215
4	(Italy) Loris Capirossi	141
5	(Australia) Troy Bayliss	119

Constructors' Championship standings

Pos.	Constructor	Points
1	(Japan) Honda	345
2	(Italy) Ducati	189
3	(Japan) Yamaha	154
4	(Italy) Aprilia	71
5	(Japan) Suzuki	31

- Note: Only the top five positions are included for both sets of standings.

Previous race: 2003 Pacific Grand Prix	FIM Grand Prix World Championship; 2003 season	Next race: 2003 Australian Grand Prix
Previous race: 2002 Malaysian Grand Prix	Malaysian motorcycle Grand Prix	Next race: 2004 Malaysian Grand Prix
