= 2004 Malaysian motorcycle Grand Prix =

(Malaysia) 2004 Malaysian Grand Prix
Race details
- Race 14 of 16 races in the 2004 Grand Prix motorcycle racing season
- Date: 10 October 2004
- Official name: Marlboro Malaysian Motorcycle Grand Prix
- Location: Sepang International Circuit
- Course: Permanent racing facility; 5.543 km (3.444 mi)

MotoGP
Pole position
- Rider: (Italy) Valentino Rossi
- Time: 2:01.833
Fastest lap
- Rider: (Italy) Valentino Rossi
- Time: 2:03.253 on lap 8
Podium
- First: (Italy) Valentino Rossi
- Second: (Italy) Max Biaggi
- Third: (Brazil) Alex Barros

250cc
Pole position
- Rider: (Argentina) Sebastián Porto
- Time: 2:06.940
Fastest lap
- Rider: (Spain) Daniel Pedrosa
- Time: 2:08.015 on lap 3
Podium
- First: (Spain) Daniel Pedrosa
- Second: (Argentina) Sebastián Porto
- Third: (Spain) Toni Elías

125cc
Pole position
- Rider: (Italy) Andrea Dovizioso
- Time: 2:12.684
Fastest lap
- Rider: (Australia) Casey Stoner
- Time: 2:14.928 on lap 2
Podium
- First: (Australia) Casey Stoner
- Second: (Italy) Andrea Dovizioso
- Third: (Spain) Álvaro Bautista

The 2004 Malaysian motorcycle Grand Prix was the fourteenth round of the 2004 MotoGP Championship. It took place on the weekend of 8–10 October 2004 at the Sepang International Circuit.

== MotoGP classification ==
Pos.	No.	Rider	Team	Manufacturer	Laps	Time/Retired	Grid	Points
1	46	(Italy) Valentino Rossi	Gauloises Fortuna Yamaha	Yamaha	21	43:29.146	1	25
2	3	(Italy) Max Biaggi	Camel Honda	Honda	21	+3.666	7	20
3	4	(Brazil) Alex Barros	Repsol Honda Team	Honda	21	+9.299	2	16
4	69	(United States) Nicky Hayden	Repsol Honda Team	Honda	21	+19.069	6	13
5	6	(Japan) Makoto Tamada	Camel Honda	Honda	21	+21.155	5	11
6	65	(Italy) Loris Capirossi	Ducati Marlboro Team	Ducati	21	+21.268	11	10
7	15	(Spain) Sete Gibernau	Telefónica Movistar Honda MotoGP	Honda	21	+21.881	4	9
8	56	(Japan) Shinya Nakano	Kawasaki Racing Team	Kawasaki	21	+22.167	3	8
9	7	(Spain) Carlos Checa	Gauloises Fortuna Yamaha	Yamaha	21	+23.150	9	7
10	12	(Australia) Troy Bayliss	Ducati Marlboro Team	Ducati	21	+32.615	14	6
11	45	(United States) Colin Edwards	Telefónica Movistar Honda MotoGP	Honda	21	+33.958	12	5
12	17	(Japan) Norifumi Abe	Fortuna Gauloises Tech 3	Yamaha	21	+44.302	16	4
13	11	(Spain) Rubén Xaus	D'Antin MotoGP	Ducati	21	+55.235	15	3
14	71	(Japan) Yukio Kagayama	Team Suzuki MotoGP	Suzuki	21	+1:09.580	20	2
15	99	(United Kingdom) Jeremy McWilliams	MS Aprilia Racing	Aprilia	21	+1:10.376	18	1
16	24	(Australia) Garry McCoy	MS Aprilia Racing	Aprilia	21	+1:16.134	19	
17	9	(Japan) Nobuatsu Aoki	Proton Team KR	Proton KR	21	+1:55.097	21	
18	77	(United Kingdom) James Ellison	WCM	Harris WCM	20	+1 lap	23	
19	41	(Japan) Youichi Ui	WCM	Harris WCM	20	+1 lap	24	
Ret	33	(Italy) Marco Melandri	Fortuna Gauloises Tech 3	Yamaha	9	Retirement	10	
Ret	36	(United Kingdom) James Haydon	Proton Team KR	Proton KR	8	Retirement	22	
Ret	66	(Germany) Alex Hofmann	Kawasaki Racing Team	Kawasaki	7	Retirement	13	
Ret	50	(United Kingdom) Neil Hodgson	D'Antin MotoGP	Ducati	6	Retirement	17	
Ret	21	(United States) John Hopkins	Team Suzuki MotoGP	Suzuki	2	Retirement	8	

== 250 cc classification ==
Pos.	No.	Rider	Manufacturer	Laps	Time/Retired	Grid	Points
1	26	(Spain) Daniel Pedrosa	Honda	20	43:03.507	2	25
2	19	(Argentina) Sebastián Porto	Aprilia	20	+13.513	1	20
3	24	(Spain) Toni Elías	Honda	20	+13.585	5	16
4	51	(San Marino) Alex de Angelis	Aprilia	20	+25.027	4	13
5	7	(France) Randy de Puniet	Aprilia	20	+49.978	3	11
6	21	(Italy) Franco Battaini	Aprilia	20	+1:02.582	9	10
7	10	(Spain) Fonsi Nieto	Aprilia	20	+1:02.670	7	9
8	9	(France) Hugo Marchand	Aprilia	20	+1:09.360	12	8
9	57	(United Kingdom) Chaz Davies	Aprilia	20	+1:09.492	18	7
10	8	(Japan) Naoki Matsudo	Yamaha	20	+1:20.994	17	6
11	25	(Italy) Alex Baldolini	Aprilia	20	+1:25.105	16	5
12	28	(Germany) Dirk Heidolf	Aprilia	20	+1:28.030	21	4
13	33	(Spain) Héctor Faubel	Aprilia	20	+1:30.746	20	3
14	96	(Czech Republic) Jakub Smrž	Honda	20	+1:31.221	15	2
15	16	(Sweden) Johan Stigefelt	Aprilia	20	+1:31.561	19	1
16	37	(Italy) Marcellino Lucchi	Aprilia	20	+1:32.219	13	
17	52	(Spain) José David de Gea	Honda	20	+1:43.502	22	
18	11	(Spain) Joan Olivé	Aprilia	20	+1:48.609	24	
19	42	(France) Grégory Leblanc	Aprilia	20	+1:48.812	25	
20	43	(Czech Republic) Radomil Rous	Yamaha	20	+2:07.022	27	
Ret	73	(Japan) Hiroshi Aoyama	Honda	15	Accident	6	
Ret	6	(Spain) Alex Debón	Honda	9	Retirement	11	
Ret	44	(Japan) Taro Sekiguchi	Yamaha	5	Retirement	26	
Ret	14	(Australia) Anthony West	Aprilia	0	Accident	8	
Ret	2	(Italy) Roberto Rolfo	Honda	0	Accident	10	
Ret	36	(France) Erwan Nigon	Aprilia	0	Accident	14	
Ret	50	(France) Sylvain Guintoli	Aprilia	0	Accident	23	
DNQ	88	(Hungary) Gergő Talmácsi	Yamaha		Did not qualify		
WD	17	(Germany) Klaus Nöhles	Honda		Withdrew		

== 125 cc classification ==
Pos.	No.	Rider	Manufacturer	Laps	Time/Retired	Grid	Points
1	27	(Australia) Casey Stoner	KTM	19	43:10.360	3	25
2	34	(Italy) Andrea Dovizioso	Honda	19	+0.029	1	20
3	19	(Spain) Álvaro Bautista	Aprilia	19	+6.547	13	16
4	15	(Italy) Roberto Locatelli	Aprilia	19	+11.579	7	13
5	32	(Italy) Fabrizio Lai	Gilera	19	+17.136	10	11
6	10	(Spain) Julián Simón	Honda	19	+17.146	15	10
7	54	(Italy) Mattia Pasini	Aprilia	19	+24.985	17	9
8	14	(Hungary) Gábor Talmácsi	Malaguti	19	+25.057	11	8
9	23	(Italy) Gino Borsoi	Aprilia	19	+25.262	18	7
10	21	(Germany) Steve Jenkner	Aprilia	19	+26.905	16	6
11	12	(Switzerland) Thomas Lüthi	Honda	19	+36.819	19	5
12	33	(Spain) Sergio Gadea	Aprilia	19	+45.558	23	4
13	26	(Germany) Dario Giuseppetti	Honda	19	+47.997	26	3
14	50	(Italy) Andrea Ballerini	Aprilia	19	+48.441	22	2
15	62	(Japan) Toshihisa Kuzuhara	Honda	19	+1:06.926	28	1
16	28	(Spain) Jordi Carchano	Aprilia	19	+1:18.854	32	
17	63	(France) Mike Di Meglio	Aprilia	19	+1:18.898	24	
18	25	(Hungary) Imre Tóth	Aprilia	19	+1:24.061	29	
19	16	(Netherlands) Raymond Schouten	Honda	19	+1:27.129	33	
20	45	(Italy) Lorenzo Zanetti	Aprilia	16	+3 laps	27	
Ret	66	(Finland) Vesa Kallio	Aprilia	17	Accident	30	
Ret	42	(Italy) Gioele Pellino	Aprilia	15	Accident	25	
Ret	47	(Spain) Ángel Rodríguez	Derbi	10	Retirement	21	
Ret	48	(Spain) Jorge Lorenzo	Derbi	8	Retirement	5	
Ret	31	(Italy) Max Sabbatani	Honda	8	Retirement	34	
Ret	9	(Czech Republic) Markéta Janáková	Honda	7	Retirement	35	
Ret	6	(Italy) Mirko Giansanti	Aprilia	5	Accident	9	
Ret	8	(Italy) Manuel Manna	Malaguti	3	Retirement	31	
Ret	7	(Italy) Stefano Perugini	Gilera	2	Accident	12	
Ret	58	(Italy) Marco Simoncelli	Aprilia	2	Accident	4	
Ret	22	(Spain) Pablo Nieto	Aprilia	2	Accident	8	
Ret	3	(Spain) Héctor Barberá	Aprilia	1	Accident	2	
Ret	36	(Finland) Mika Kallio	KTM	1	Accident	6	
Ret	52	(Czech Republic) Lukáš Pešek	Honda	1	Accident	20	
Ret	24	(Italy) Simone Corsi	Honda	0	Accident	14	

== Championship standings after the race (MotoGP) ==
Below are the standings for the top five riders and constructors after round fourteen has concluded.

Riders' Championship standings

Pos.	Rider	Points
1	(Italy) Valentino Rossi	254
2	(Spain) Sete Gibernau	224
3	(Italy) Max Biaggi	188
4	(Brazil) Alex Barros	144
5	(United States) Colin Edwards	136

Constructors' Championship standings

Pos.	Constructor	Points
1	(Japan) Honda	315
2	(Japan) Yamaha	278
3	(Italy) Ducati	137
4	(Japan) Kawasaki	82
5	(Japan) Suzuki	68

- Note: Only the top five positions are included for both sets of standings.

Previous race: 2004 Qatar Grand Prix	FIM Grand Prix World Championship; 2004 season	Next race: 2004 Australian Grand Prix
Previous race: 2003 Malaysian Grand Prix	Malaysian motorcycle Grand Prix	Next race: 2005 Malaysian Grand Prix
