= 2002 Australian motorcycle Grand Prix =

(Australia) 2002 Australian Grand Prix
Race details
- Race 15 of 16 races in the 2002 Grand Prix motorcycle racing season
- Date: 20 October 2002
- Official name: SKYY vodka Australian Grand Prix
- Location: Phillip Island Grand Prix Circuit
- Course: Permanent racing facility; 4.448 km (2.764 mi)

MotoGP
Pole position
Rider	(United Kingdom) Jeremy McWilliams	Proton KR
Time	1:31.919	
Fastest lap
Rider	(Italy) Valentino Rossi	Honda
Time	1:32.233 on lap 11	
Podium
First	(Italy) Valentino Rossi	Honda
Second	(Brazil) Alex Barros	Honda
Third	(Japan) Tohru Ukawa	Honda

250cc
Pole position
Rider	(Spain) Fonsi Nieto	Aprilia
Time	1:33.904	
Fastest lap
Rider	(Italy) Marco Melandri	Aprilia
Time	1:34.072 on lap 22	
Podium
First	(Italy) Marco Melandri	Aprilia
Second	(Spain) Fonsi Nieto	Aprilia
Third	(Argentina) Sebastián Porto	Yamaha

125cc
Pole position
Rider	(San Marino) Manuel Poggiali	Gilera
Time	1:38.632	
Fastest lap
Rider	(Spain) Daniel Pedrosa	Honda
Time	1:37.983 on lap 23	
Podium
First	(San Marino) Manuel Poggiali	Gilera
Second	(Italy) Lucio Cecchinello	Aprilia
Third	(Spain) Pablo Nieto	Aprilia

The 2002 Australian motorcycle Grand Prix was the penultimate round of the 2002 MotoGP Championship. It took place on the weekend of 18–20 October 2002 at the Phillip Island Grand Prix Circuit.

== MotoGP classification ==
Pos.	No.	Rider	Team	Manufacturer	Laps	Time/Retired	Grid	Points
1	46	(Italy) Valentino Rossi	Repsol Honda Team	Honda	27	42:02.041	7	25
2	4	(Brazil) Alex Barros	West Honda Pons	Honda	27	+9.782	5	20
3	11	(Japan) Tohru Ukawa	Repsol Honda Team	Honda	27	+11.134	6	16
4	74	(Japan) Daijiro Kato	Fortuna Honda Gresini	Honda	27	+11.327	10	13
5	17	(Netherlands) Jurgen van den Goorbergh	Kanemoto Racing	Honda	27	+11.414	4	11
6	3	(Italy) Max Biaggi	Marlboro Yamaha Team	Yamaha	27	+20.937	8	10
7	9	(Japan) Nobuatsu Aoki	Proton Team KR	Proton KR	27	+22.505	3	9
8	19	(France) Olivier Jacque	Gauloises Yamaha Tech 3	Yamaha	27	+26.642	17	8
9	10	(United States) Kenny Roberts Jr.	Telefónica Movistar Suzuki	Suzuki	27	+26.692	12	7
10	99	(United Kingdom) Jeremy McWilliams	Proton Team KR	Proton KR	27	+31.994	1	6
11	7	(Spain) Carlos Checa	Marlboro Yamaha Team	Yamaha	27	+34.563	20	5
12	15	(Spain) Sete Gibernau	Telefónica Movistar Suzuki	Suzuki	27	+38.827	15	4
13	56	(Japan) Shinya Nakano	Gauloises Yamaha Tech 3	Yamaha	27	+45.418	16	3
14	31	(Japan) Tetsuya Harada	Pramac Honda Racing Team	Honda	27	+52.542	18	2
15	30	(Spain) José Luis Cardoso	Antena 3 Yamaha d'Antín	Yamaha	27	+52.765	21	1
16	21	(United States) John Hopkins	Red Bull Yamaha WCM	Yamaha	27	+1:12.169	14	
17	84	(Australia) Andrew Pitt	Kawasaki Racing Team	Kawasaki	27	+1:12.196	19	
18	8	(Australia) Garry McCoy	Red Bull Yamaha WCM	Yamaha	26	+1 lap	2	
Ret (19)	72	(Japan) Shinichi Ito	Kanemoto Racing	Honda	11	Retirement	13	
Ret (20)	55	(France) Régis Laconi	MS Aprilia Racing	Aprilia	10	Retirement	11	
Ret (21)	65	(Italy) Loris Capirossi	West Honda Pons	Honda	2	Retirement	9	
DNS	6	(Japan) Norifumi Abe	Antena 3 Yamaha d'Antín	Yamaha		Did not start		

== 250 cc classification ==
Pos.	No.	Rider	Manufacturer	Laps	Time/Retired	Grid	Points
1	3	(Italy) Marco Melandri	Aprilia	25	39:44.293	2	25
2	10	(Spain) Fonsi Nieto	Aprilia	25	+0.007	1	20
3	9	(Argentina) Sebastián Porto	Yamaha	25	+5.766	3	16
4	4	(Italy) Roberto Rolfo	Honda	25	+16.042	9	13
5	24	(Spain) Toni Elías	Aprilia	25	+18.917	4	11
6	17	(France) Randy de Puniet	Aprilia	25	+18.985	5	10
7	21	(Italy) Franco Battaini	Aprilia	25	+21.349	6	9
8	42	(Spain) David Checa	Aprilia	25	+39.582	12	8
9	6	(Spain) Alex Debón	Aprilia	25	+46.230	8	7
10	27	(Australia) Casey Stoner	Aprilia	25	+50.645	13	6
11	11	(Japan) Haruchika Aoki	Honda	25	+55.268	15	5
12	13	(Czech Republic) Jaroslav Huleš	Yamaha	25	+55.288	7	4
13	7	(Spain) Emilio Alzamora	Honda	25	+1:07.391	11	3
14	8	(Japan) Naoki Matsudo	Yamaha	25	+1:09.565	16	2
15	18	(Malaysia) Shahrol Yuzy	Yamaha	25	+1:09.973	18	1
16	28	(Germany) Dirk Heidolf	Aprilia	25	+1:10.270	21	
17	96	(Czech Republic) Jakub Smrž	Honda	25	+1:10.368	22	
18	19	(United Kingdom) Leon Haslam	Honda	25	+1:10.966	10	
19	32	(Spain) Héctor Faubel	Aprilia	25	+1:25.241	19	
20	79	(Australia) Russell Holland	Yamaha	24	+1 lap	25	
Ret (21)	22	(Spain) Raúl Jara	Aprilia	19	Retirement	24	
Ret (22)	12	(United Kingdom) Jay Vincent	Honda	16	Accident	17	
Ret (23)	15	(Italy) Roberto Locatelli	Aprilia	5	Accident	14	
Ret (24)	36	(France) Erwan Nigon	Aprilia	3	Retirement	20	
DNS	51	(France) Hugo Marchand	Aprilia	0	Did not start	23	
DNQ	81	(Australia) Mark Stanley	Honda		Did not qualify		
DNQ	80	(Australia) Earl Lynch	Yamaha		Did not qualify		
DNQ	78	(Australia) Peter Taplin	Honda		Did not qualify		

== 125 cc classification ==
Pos.	No.	Rider	Manufacturer	Laps	Time/Retired	Grid	Points
1	1	(San Marino) Manuel Poggiali	Gilera	23	38:08.028	1	25
2	4	(Italy) Lucio Cecchinello	Aprilia	23	+1.252	5	20
3	22	(Spain) Pablo Nieto	Aprilia	23	+1.310	6	16
4	21	(France) Arnaud Vincent	Aprilia	23	+1.414	2	13
5	26	(Spain) Daniel Pedrosa	Honda	23	+1.575	10	11
6	16	(Italy) Simone Sanna	Aprilia	23	+5.615	7	10
7	17	(Germany) Steve Jenkner	Aprilia	23	+16.861	4	9
8	5	(Japan) Masao Azuma	Honda	23	+21.544	17	8
9	25	(Spain) Joan Olivé	Honda	23	+21.833	16	7
10	34	(Italy) Andrea Dovizioso	Honda	23	+22.168	9	6
11	50	(Italy) Andrea Ballerini	Aprilia	23	+28.012	12	5
12	7	(Italy) Stefano Perugini	Italjet	23	+32.645	13	4
13	41	(Japan) Youichi Ui	Derbi	23	+33.386	14	3
14	80	(Spain) Héctor Barberá	Aprilia	23	+39.047	19	2
15	6	(Italy) Mirko Giansanti	Honda	23	+39.117	24	1
16	8	(Hungary) Gábor Talmácsi	Honda	23	+39.282	20	
17	11	(Italy) Max Sabbatani	Aprilia	23	+55.604	21	
18	12	(Germany) Klaus Nöhles	Honda	23	+57.689	25	
19	31	(Italy) Mattia Angeloni	Gilera	23	+57.861	27	
20	19	(Italy) Alex Baldolini	Aprilia	23	+58.141	28	
21	9	(Japan) Noboru Ueda	Honda	23	+58.148	26	
22	57	(United Kingdom) Chaz Davies	Aprilia	23	+1:28.678	29	
23	20	(Hungary) Imre Tóth	Honda	23	+1:32.597	30	
24	72	(Germany) Dario Giuseppetti	Honda	23	+1:32.853	33	
25	83	(Australia) Joshua Waters	Honda	22	+1 lap	32	
26	64	(Australia) Peter Holmes	Honda	22	+1 lap	35	
27	82	(Australia) Jeremy Crowe	Honda	22	+1 lap	36	
Ret (28)	48	(Spain) Jorge Lorenzo	Derbi	18	Accident	22	
Ret (29)	84	(Italy) Michel Fabrizio	Gilera	18	Retirement	23	
Ret (30)	15	(San Marino) Alex de Angelis	Aprilia	15	Retirement	3	
Ret (31)	36	(Finland) Mika Kallio	Honda	14	Accident	11	
Ret (32)	77	(Switzerland) Thomas Lüthi	Honda	7	Accident	31	
Ret (33)	23	(Italy) Gino Borsoi	Aprilia	6	Retirement	15	
Ret (34)	42	(Italy) Christian Pistoni	Italjet	6	Retirement	34	
Ret (35)	33	(Italy) Stefano Bianco	Aprilia	0	Retirement	8	
Ret (36)	37	(Italy) Marco Simoncelli	Aprilia	0	Accident	18	
DNQ	81	(Australia) Tim Inkster	Honda		Did not qualify		

== Championship standings after the race (MotoGP) ==
Below are the standings for the top five riders and constructors after round fifteen has concluded.

Riders' Championship standings

Pos.	Rider	Points
1	(Italy) Valentino Rossi	335
2	(Italy) Max Biaggi	199
3	(Japan) Tohru Ukawa	198
4	(Brazil) Alex Barros	179
5	(Spain) Carlos Checa	141

Constructors' Championship standings

Pos.	Constructor	Points
1	(Japan) Honda	365
2	(Japan) Yamaha	256
3	(Japan) Suzuki	140
4	(Malaysia) / (United States) Proton KR	88
5	(Italy) Aprilia	33

- Note: Only the top five positions are included for both sets of standings.

Previous race: 2002 Malaysian Grand Prix	FIM Grand Prix World Championship; 2002 season	Next race: 2002 Valencian Grand Prix
Previous race: 2001 Australian Grand Prix	Australian motorcycle Grand Prix	Next race: 2003 Australian Grand Prix
