= Pablo Nieto =

Spanish motorcycle racer

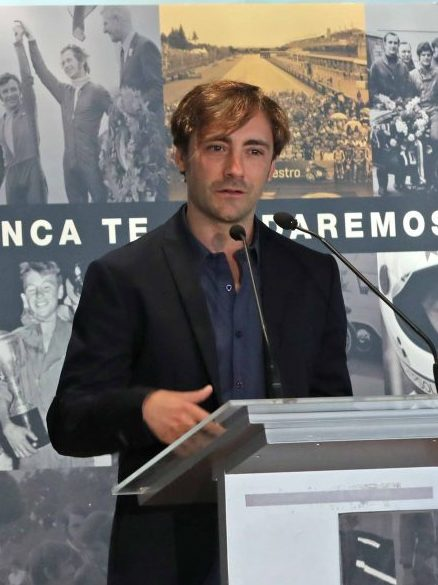
- Pablo Nieto in 2017
- Nationality: Spanish
- Born: 4 June 1980 (age 46); Madrid, Spain

Pablo Nieto Aguilar (born 4 June 1980 in Madrid, Community of Madrid) is a Spanish former road racer of Grand Prix solo motorcycles, latterly involved in team management. He is the son of the Spanish motorcycle racer Ángel Nieto, and cousin of Fonsi Nieto.

He started to race professionally in 1998, and spent his career in the 125cc class. Following the race at Valencia in 2008, he announced his retirement from racing, to move to a managerial position of the Onde 2000 MotoGP team with Sete Gibernau in 2009 as the team's only rider. He was the team manager for the Laglisse Moto3 team from 2012-2014, in the 2013 Moto3 Grand Prix season, his rider Maverick Viñales won the championship. He is now the team manager for the VR46 Racing Team established by Valentino Rossi.

== Grand Prix motorcycle racing career ==
Season	Class	Moto	Team	Number	Races	Win	Podiums	Pole	FLap	Pts	Position
1998	125cc	Aprilia	Via Digital Team	79	1	0	0	0	0	0	NC
1999	125cc	Derbi	Festina-Derbi	22	16	0	0	0	0	15	23rd
2000	125cc	Derbi	Derbi Racing	22	16	0	0	0	1	68	13th
2001	125cc	Derbi	L & M Derbi Team	22	15	0	0	0	0	21	24th
2002	125cc	Aprilia	Master-Aspar Team	22	16	0	3	1	0	145	6th
2003	125cc	Aprilia	Master-MXOnda-Aspar Team	22	16	1	3	2	1	148	7th
2004	125cc	Aprilia	Master - Repsol Team 125cc	22	16	0	2	0	2	138	6th
2005	125cc	Derbi	Caja Madria - Derbi Racing	22	16	0	0	0	1	64	13th
2006	125cc	Aprilia	Multimedia Racing	22	13	0	0	0	0	66	13th
2007	125cc	Aprilia	Blusens Aprilia	22	17	0	0	0	0	57	15th
2008	125cc	KTM	Onde 2000 - KTM	22	16	0	0	0	0	25	21st
Total					**158**	**1**	**8**	**3**	**5**	**747**	

=== Races by year ===
(key) (Races in bold indicate pole position, races in italics indicate fastest lap)

Year	Class	Bike	1	2	3	4	5	6	7	8	9	10	11	12	13	14	15	16	17	Pos.	Pts
1998	125cc	Aprilia	JPN	MAL	SPA	ITA	FRA	MAD	NED	GBR	GER	CZE	IMO	CAT; 22	AUS	ARG				NC	0
1999	125cc	Derbi	MAL; 22	JPN; 19	SPA; Ret	FRA; 18	ITA; 22	CAT; Ret	NED; 16	GBR; 12	GER; Ret	CZE; 22	IMO; 17	VAL; Ret	AUS; 17	RSA; 12	BRA; Ret	ARG; 9		23rd	15
2000	125cc	Derbi	RSA; 15	MAL; 11	JPN; 11	SPA; Ret	FRA; Ret	ITA; 11	CAT; 6	NED; 19	GBR; 15	GER; 7	CZE; 16	POR; 12	VAL; 4	BRA; 10	PAC; 9	AUS; 14		13th	68
2001	125cc	Derbi	JPN; 10	RSA; 15	SPA; Ret	FRA; DNS	ITA; Ret	CAT; 6	NED; Ret	GBR; Ret	GER; Ret	CZE; 18	POR; Ret	VAL; 14	PAC; 16	AUS; 20	MAL; Ret	BRA; 14		24th	21
2002	125cc	Aprilia	JPN; Ret	**RSA**; 5	SPA; Ret	FRA; 6	ITA; 3	CAT; 8	NED; 7	GBR; Ret	GER; 5	CZE; Ret	POR; 4	BRA; 5	PAC; 4	MAL; 5	AUS; 3	VAL; 3		6th	145
2003	125cc	Aprilia	JPN; 7	RSA; 5	**SPA**; Ret	FRA; 5	ITA; 3	**CAT**; 17	NED; 2	GBR; 6	GER; 5	CZE; Ret	POR; 1	BRA; 5	PAC; 8	MAL; 9	AUS; Ret	VAL; 7		7th	148
2004	125cc	Aprilia	RSA; 4	SPA; 9	FRA; 7	ITA; 6	CAT; 3	NED; 8	BRA; 7	GER; 3	GBR; Ret	CZE; 4	POR; 4	JPN; Ret	QAT; 6	MAL; Ret	AUS; 15	VAL; 4		6th	138
2005	125cc	Derbi	SPA; 12	POR; 12	CHN; 8	FRA; 7	ITA; 22	CAT; Ret	NED; 11	GBR; 5	GER; 10	CZE; 16	JPN; 8	MAL; 13	QAT; Ret	AUS; 18	TUR; 20	VAL; 10		13th	64
2006	125cc	Aprilia	SPA; 10	QAT; 5	TUR; 14	CHN; Ret	FRA; 5	ITA; 12	CAT; 7	NED; 9	GBR; Ret	GER; Ret	CZE; 9	MAL; Ret	AUS	JPN	POR	VAL; 7		13th	66
2007	125cc	Aprilia	QAT; 9	SPA; 6	TUR; 13	CHN; 16	FRA; 15	ITA; Ret	CAT; 20	GBR; 9	NED; Ret	GER; 9	CZE; Ret	RSM; Ret	POR; Ret	JPN; 7	AUS; Ret	MAL; 12	VAL; 7	15th	57
2008	125cc	KTM	QAT; 18	SPA; 5	POR; Ret	CHN	FRA; Ret	ITA; Ret	CAT; Ret	GBR; 20	NED; 20	GER; 14	CZE; 16	RSM; Ret	INP; Ret	JPN; 18	AUS; 13	MAL; 14	VAL; 9	21st	25
