= 2003 Valencian Community motorcycle Grand Prix =

2003 Valencian Community Grand Prix
Race details
- Race 16 of 16 races in the 2003 Grand Prix motorcycle racing season
- Date: 2 November 2003
- Official name: Gran Premio Marlboro de la Comunitat Valenciana
- Location: Circuit Ricardo Tormo
- Course: Permanent racing facility; 4.005 km (2.489 mi)

MotoGP
Pole position
| Rider | (Italy) Valentino Rossi | Honda |
| Time | 1:32.478 | |
Fastest lap
| Rider | (Italy) Valentino Rossi | Honda |
| Time | 1:33.317 on lap 24 | |
Podium
| First | (Italy) Valentino Rossi | Honda |
| Second | (Spain) Sete Gibernau | Honda |
| Third | (Italy) Loris Capirossi | Ducati |

250cc
Pole position
| Rider | (France) Randy de Puniet | Aprilia |
| Time | 1:36.499 | |
Fastest lap
| Rider | (Spain) Toni Elías | Aprilia |
| Time | 1:36.840 on lap 14 | |
Podium
| First | (France) Randy de Puniet | Aprilia |
| Second | (Spain) Toni Elías | Aprilia |
| Third | (San Marino) Manuel Poggiali | Aprilia |

125cc
Pole position
| Rider | (San Marino) Alex de Angelis | Aprilia |
| Time | 1:40.440 | |
Fastest lap
| Rider | (Germany) Steve Jenkner | Aprilia |
| Time | 1:40.253 on lap 17 | |
Podium
| First | (Australia) Casey Stoner | Aprilia |
| Second | (Germany) Steve Jenkner | Aprilia |
| Third | (Spain) Héctor Barberá | Aprilia |

The 2003 Valencian Community motorcycle Grand Prix was the last round of the 2003 MotoGP Championship. It took place on the weekend of 31 October – 2 November 2003 at the Circuit Ricardo Tormo.

== MotoGP classification ==
| Pos. | No. | Rider | Team | Manufacturer | Laps | Time/Retired | Grid | Points |
|---|---|---|---|---|---|---|---|---|
| 1 | 46 | (Italy) Valentino Rossi | Repsol Honda | Honda | 30 | 47:13.078 | 1 | 25 |
| 2 | 15 | (Spain) Sete Gibernau | Telefónica Movistar Honda | Honda | 30 | +0.681 | 2 | 20 |
| 3 | 65 | (Italy) Loris Capirossi | Ducati Marlboro Team | Ducati | 30 | +11.227 | 3 | 16 |
| 4 | 3 | (Italy) Max Biaggi | Camel Pramac Pons | Honda | 30 | +16.293 | 6 | 13 |
| 5 | 7 | (Spain) Carlos Checa | Fortuna Yamaha Team | Yamaha | 30 | +20.868 | 5 | 11 |
| 6 | 4 | (Brazil) Alex Barros | Gauloises Yamaha Team | Yamaha | 30 | +30.851 | 8 | 10 |
| 7 | 12 | (Australia) Troy Bayliss | Ducati Marlboro Team | Ducati | 30 | +37.770 | 10 | 9 |
| 8 | 45 | (United States) Colin Edwards | Alice Aprilia Racing | Aprilia | 30 | +38.922 | 7 | 8 |
| 9 | 17 | (Japan) Norifumi Abe | Fortuna Yamaha Team | Yamaha | 30 | +40.229 | 11 | 7 |
| 10 | 6 | (Japan) Makoto Tamada | Pramac Honda | Honda | 30 | +46.500 | 13 | 6 |
| 11 | 10 | (United States) Kenny Roberts Jr. | Suzuki Grand Prix Team | Suzuki | 30 | +1:01.496 | 18 | 5 |
| 12 | 99 | (United Kingdom) Jeremy McWilliams | Proton Team KR | Proton KR | 30 | +1:04.510 | 15 | 4 |
| 13 | 21 | (United States) John Hopkins | Suzuki Grand Prix Team | Suzuki | 30 | +1:05.191 | 17 | 3 |
| 14 | 23 | (Japan) Ryuichi Kiyonari | Telefónica Movistar Honda | Honda | 30 | +1:06.012 | 20 | 2 |
| 15 | 41 | (Japan) Noriyuki Haga | Alice Aprilia Racing | Aprilia | 30 | +1:06.154 | 22 | 1 |
| 16 | 69 | (United States) Nicky Hayden | Repsol Honda | Honda | 30 | +1:11.432 | 4 | |
| 17 | 9 | (Japan) Nobuatsu Aoki | Proton Team KR | Proton KR | 30 | +1:26.736 | 19 | |
| 18 | 88 | (Australia) Andrew Pitt | Kawasaki Racing Team | Kawasaki | 30 | +1:27.016 | 16 | |
| 19 | 8 | (Australia) Garry McCoy | Kawasaki Racing Team | Kawasaki | 30 | +1:27.450 | 14 | |
| 20 | 52 | (Spain) José David de Gea | WCM | Harris WCM | 29 | +1 lap | 23 | |
| Ret | 19 | (France) Olivier Jacque | Gauloises Yamaha Team | Yamaha | 28 | Retirement | 21 | |
| Ret | 11 | (Japan) Tohru Ukawa | Camel Pramac Pons | Honda | 4 | Accident | 9 | |
| Ret | 56 | (Japan) Shinya Nakano | d'Antín Yamaha Team | Yamaha | 4 | Accident | 12 | |
| WD | 35 | (United Kingdom) Chris Burns | WCM | Harris WCM | | Withdrew | | |

== 250 cc classification ==
| Pos. | No. | Rider | Manufacturer | Laps | Time/Retired | Grid | Points |
|---|---|---|---|---|---|---|---|
| 1 | 7 | (France) Randy de Puniet | Aprilia | 27 | 44:01.924 | 1 | 25 |
| 2 | 24 | (Spain) Toni Elías | Aprilia | 27 | +0.072 | 2 | 20 |
| 3 | 54 | (San Marino) Manuel Poggiali | Aprilia | 27 | +12.810 | 4 | 16 |
| 4 | 50 | (France) Sylvain Guintoli | Aprilia | 27 | +22.496 | 3 | 13 |
| 5 | 10 | (Spain) Fonsi Nieto | Aprilia | 27 | +30.731 | 7 | 11 |
| 6 | 5 | (Argentina) Sebastián Porto | Honda | 27 | +32.381 | 9 | 10 |
| 7 | 3 | (Italy) Roberto Rolfo | Honda | 27 | +35.547 | 10 | 9 |
| 8 | 21 | (Italy) Franco Battaini | Aprilia | 27 | +36.987 | 6 | 8 |
| 9 | 34 | (France) Eric Bataille | Honda | 27 | +38.672 | 12 | 7 |
| 10 | 6 | (Spain) Alex Debón | Honda | 27 | +41.748 | 5 | 6 |
| 11 | 8 | (Japan) Naoki Matsudo | Yamaha | 27 | +55.156 | 8 | 5 |
| 12 | 28 | (Germany) Dirk Heidolf | Aprilia | 27 | +1:03.117 | 18 | 4 |
| 13 | 57 | (United Kingdom) Chaz Davies | Aprilia | 27 | +1:08.018 | 15 | 3 |
| 14 | 96 | (Czech Republic) Jakub Smrž | Honda | 27 | +1:18.041 | 16 | 2 |
| 15 | 73 | (Czech Republic) Radomil Rous | Aprilia | 27 | +1:24.071 | 19 | 1 |
| 16 | 40 | (Spain) Álvaro Molina | Aprilia | 27 | +1:29.994 | 26 | |
| 17 | 16 | (Sweden) Johan Stigefelt | Aprilia | 27 | +1:32.471 | 21 | |
| 18 | 18 | (Netherlands) Henk vd Lagemaat | Honda | 26 | +1 lap | 27 | |
| 19 | 52 | (Czech Republic) Lukáš Pešek | Yamaha | 26 | +1 lap | 25 | |
| 20 | 83 | (Netherlands) Patrick Lakerveld | Aprilia | 25 | +2 laps | 28 | |
| Ret | 36 | (France) Erwan Nigon | Aprilia | 15 | Retirement | 17 | |
| Ret | 14 | (Australia) Anthony West | Aprilia | 14 | Retirement | 13 | |
| Ret | 26 | (Italy) Alex Baldolini | Aprilia | 13 | Retirement | 24 | |
| Ret | 9 | (France) Hugo Marchand | Aprilia | 11 | Retirement | 23 | |
| Ret | 15 | (Germany) Christian Gemmel | Honda | 8 | Retirement | 20 | |
| Ret | 13 | (Czech Republic) Jaroslav Huleš | Honda | 2 | Accident | 14 | |
| Ret | 33 | (Spain) Héctor Faubel | Aprilia | 1 | Retirement | 11 | |
| Ret | 11 | (Spain) Joan Olivé | Aprilia | 1 | Retirement | 22 | |
| DNQ | 84 | (Austria) Yves Polzer | Honda | | Did not qualify | | |
| DNQ | 42 | (France) Grégory Leblanc | Honda | | Did not qualify | | |

== 125 cc classification ==
| Pos. | No. | Rider | Manufacturer | Laps | Time/Retired | Grid | Points |
|---|---|---|---|---|---|---|---|
| 1 | 27 | (Australia) Casey Stoner | Aprilia | 24 | 40:27.662 | 8 | 25 |
| 2 | 17 | (Germany) Steve Jenkner | Aprilia | 24 | +0.268 | 13 | 20 |
| 3 | 80 | (Spain) Héctor Barberá | Aprilia | 24 | +1.101 | 4 | 16 |
| 4 | 58 | (Italy) Marco Simoncelli | Aprilia | 24 | +3.205 | 3 | 13 |
| 5 | 6 | (Italy) Mirko Giansanti | Aprilia | 24 | +8.760 | 11 | 11 |
| 6 | 19 | (Spain) Álvaro Bautista | Aprilia | 24 | +8.888 | 7 | 10 |
| 7 | 22 | (Spain) Pablo Nieto | Aprilia | 24 | +12.265 | 2 | 9 |
| 8 | 34 | (Italy) Andrea Dovizioso | Honda | 24 | +16.738 | 5 | 8 |
| 9 | 4 | (Italy) Lucio Cecchinello | Aprilia | 24 | +21.089 | 15 | 7 |
| 10 | 23 | (Italy) Gino Borsoi | Aprilia | 24 | +30.673 | 9 | 6 |
| 11 | 48 | (Spain) Jorge Lorenzo | Derbi | 24 | +32.847 | 17 | 5 |
| 12 | 79 | (Hungary) Gábor Talmácsi | Aprilia | 24 | +32.954 | 21 | 4 |
| 13 | 7 | (Italy) Stefano Perugini | Aprilia | 24 | +33.349 | 6 | 3 |
| 14 | 88 | (Denmark) Robbin Harms | Aprilia | 24 | +34.889 | 14 | 2 |
| 15 | 8 | (Japan) Masao Azuma | Honda | 24 | +34.958 | 31 | 1 |
| 16 | 11 | (Italy) Max Sabbatani | Aprilia | 24 | +40.633 | 24 | |
| 17 | 10 | (Italy) Roberto Locatelli | KTM | 24 | +45.678 | 18 | |
| 18 | 32 | (Italy) Fabrizio Lai | Malaguti | 24 | +50.241 | 19 | |
| 19 | 31 | (Spain) Julián Simón | Malaguti | 24 | +50.313 | 22 | |
| 20 | 70 | (Spain) Sergio Gadea | Aprilia | 24 | +58.305 | 29 | |
| 21 | 33 | (Italy) Stefano Bianco | Gilera | 24 | +58.315 | 23 | |
| 22 | 25 | (Hungary) Imre Tóth | Aprilia | 24 | +1:23.309 | 26 | |
| 23 | 81 | (Spain) Ismael Ortega | Aprilia | 24 | +1:33.631 | 35 | |
| 24 | 26 | (Spain) Emilio Alzamora | Derbi | 24 | +1:39.042 | 28 | |
| Ret | 90 | (Germany) Dario Giuseppetti | Honda | 20 | Accident | 30 | |
| Ret | 28 | (Italy) Michele Danese | Honda | 17 | Retirement | 37 | |
| Ret | 1 | (France) Arnaud Vincent | Aprilia | 14 | Retirement | 12 | |
| Ret | 42 | (Italy) Gioele Pellino | Aprilia | 9 | Retirement | 36 | |
| Ret | 63 | (France) Mike Di Meglio | Honda | 7 | Retirement | 25 | |
| Ret | 24 | (Italy) Simone Corsi | Honda | 3 | Accident | 33 | |
| Ret | 50 | (Italy) Andrea Ballerini | Honda | 3 | Accident | 32 | |
| Ret | 15 | (San Marino) Alex de Angelis | Aprilia | 1 | Accident | 1 | |
| Ret | 36 | (Finland) Mika Kallio | KTM | 1 | Accident | 10 | |
| Ret | 41 | (Japan) Youichi Ui | Gilera | 1 | Retirement | 16 | |
| DNS | 12 | (Switzerland) Thomas Lüthi | Honda | 0 | Did not start | 20 | |
| DNS | 43 | (Spain) Manuel Hernández | Aprilia | 0 | Did not start | 27 | |
| DNS | 69 | (Spain) David Bonache | Honda | 0 | Did not start | 34 | |

== Championship standings after the race (motoGP) ==
Below are the standings for the top five riders and constructors after round sixteen has concluded.

Riders' Championship standings

| Pos. | Rider | Points |
|---|---|---|
| 1 | (Italy) Valentino Rossi | 357 |
| 2 | (Spain) Sete Gibernau | 277 |
| 3 | (Italy) Max Biaggi | 228 |
| 4 | (Italy) Loris Capirossi | 177 |
| 5 | (United States) Nicky Hayden | 130 |

Constructors' Championship standings

| Pos. | Constructor | Points |
|---|---|---|
| 1 | (Japan) Honda | 395 |
| 2 | (Italy) Ducati | 225 |
| 3 | (Japan) Yamaha | 175 |
| 4 | (Italy) Aprilia | 81 |
| 5 | (Japan) Suzuki | 43 |

- Note: Only the top five positions are included for both sets of standings.

| Previous race: 2003 Australian Grand Prix | FIM Grand Prix World Championship; 2003 season | Next race: 2004 South African Grand Prix |
| Previous race: 2002 Valencian Grand Prix | Valencian Community motorcycle Grand Prix | Next race: 2004 Valencian Grand Prix |
