= 2003 Australian motorcycle Grand Prix =

(Australia) 2003 Australian Grand Prix
Race details
- Race 15 of 16 races in the 2003 Grand Prix motorcycle racing season
- Date: 19 October 2003
- Official name: SKYY vodka Australian Grand Prix
- Location: Phillip Island Grand Prix Circuit
- Course: Permanent racing facility; 4.448 km (2.764 mi)

MotoGP
Pole position
Rider	(Italy) Valentino Rossi	Honda
Time	1:30.068	
Fastest lap
Rider	(Italy) Valentino Rossi	Honda
Time	1:31.421 on lap 18	
Podium
First	(Italy) Valentino Rossi	Honda
Second	(Italy) Loris Capirossi	Ducati
Third	(United States) Nicky Hayden	Honda

250cc
Pole position
Rider	(Spain) Toni Elías	Aprilia
Time	1:33.771	
Fastest lap
Rider	(Czech Republic) Jaroslav Huleš	Honda
Time	1:45.680 on lap 24	
Podium
First	(Italy) Roberto Rolfo	Honda
Second	(Australia) Anthony West	Aprilia
Third	(Spain) Fonsi Nieto	Aprilia

125cc
Pole position
Rider	(Italy) Stefano Perugini	Aprilia
Time	1:37.342	
Fastest lap
Rider	(Italy) Andrea Ballerini	Honda
Time	1:50.518 on lap 17	
Podium
First	(Italy) Andrea Ballerini	Honda
Second	(Japan) Masao Azuma	Honda
Third	(Germany) Steve Jenkner	Aprilia

The 2003 Australian motorcycle Grand Prix was the penultimate round of the 2003 MotoGP Championship. It took place on the weekend of 17–19 October 2003 at the Phillip Island Grand Prix Circuit. The MotoGP race is known for newly-crowned champion Valentino Rossi's dominant win despite a 10-second penalty for overtaking under the yellow flags from Troy Bayliss' crash.

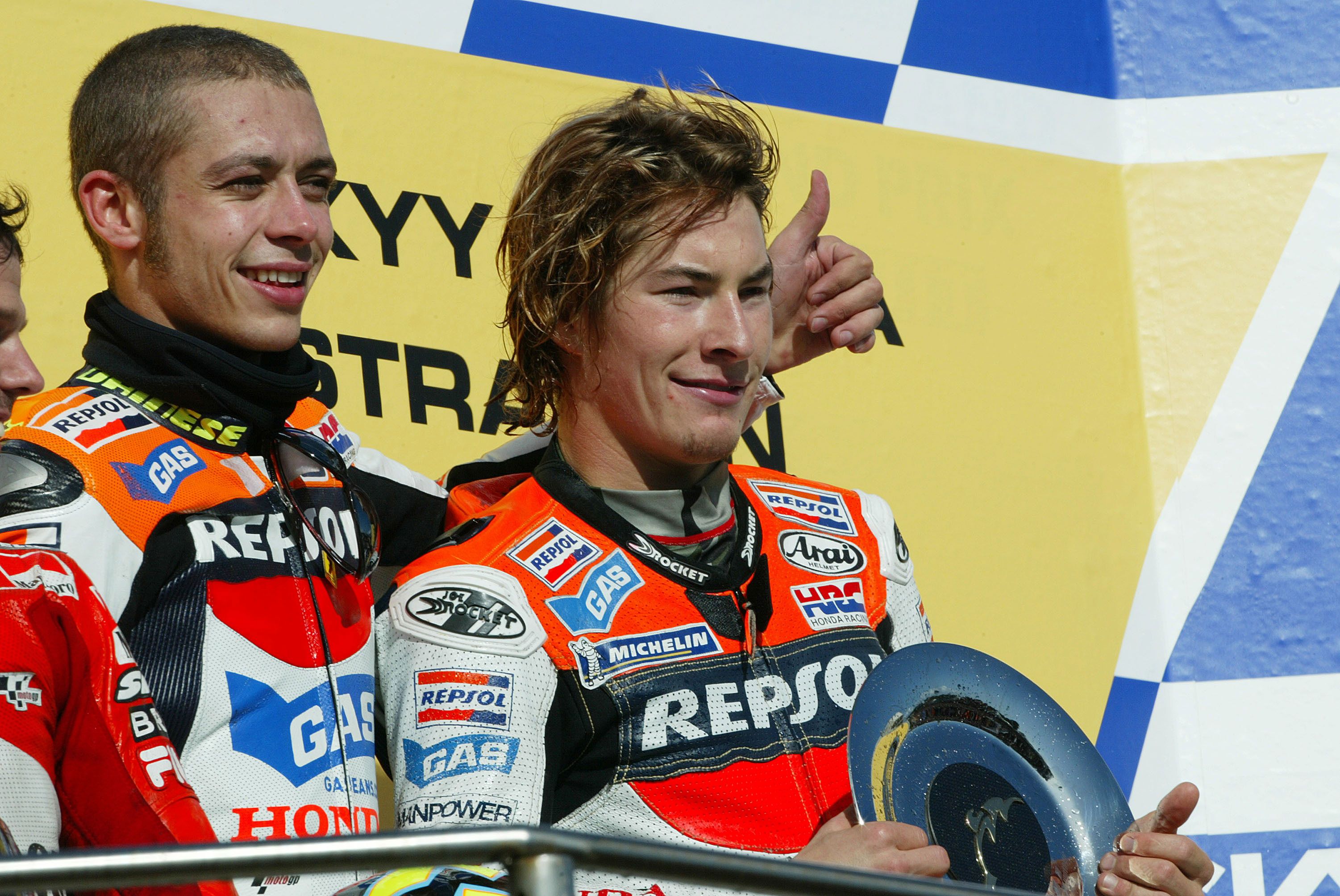
Valentino Rossi and Nicky Hayden on the podium after finishing first and third. This was Hayden's second podium in his rookie season.

== MotoGP classification ==
Pos.	No.	Rider	Team	Manufacturer	Laps	Time/Retired	Grid	Points
1	46	(Italy) Valentino Rossi	Repsol Honda	Honda	27	41:53.543 (Note: 10-second penalty for overtaking under yellow flags.)	1	25
2	65	(Italy) Loris Capirossi	Ducati Marlboro Team	Ducati	27	+5.212	2	20
3	69	(United States) Nicky Hayden	Repsol Honda	Honda	27	+12.039	5	16
4	15	(Spain) Sete Gibernau	Telefónica Movistar Honda	Honda	27	+12.070	3	13
5	11	(Japan) Tohru Ukawa	Camel Pramac Pons	Honda	27	+12.294	8	11
6	19	(France) Olivier Jacque	Gauloises Yamaha Team	Yamaha	27	+28.017	15	10
7	56	(Japan) Shinya Nakano	d'Antín Yamaha Team	Yamaha	27	+28.044	11	9
8	7	(Spain) Carlos Checa	Fortuna Yamaha Team	Yamaha	27	+40.112	9	8
9	10	(United States) Kenny Roberts Jr.	Suzuki Grand Prix Team	Suzuki	27	+41.410	14	7
10	6	(Japan) Makoto Tamada	Pramac Honda	Honda	27	+49.902	17	6
11	99	(United Kingdom) Jeremy McWilliams	Proton Team KR	Proton KR	27	+51.260	10	5
12	21	(United States) John Hopkins	Suzuki Grand Prix Team	Suzuki	27	+54.101	13	4
13	8	(Australia) Garry McCoy	Kawasaki Racing Team	Kawasaki	27	+54.779	12	3
14	41	(Japan) Noriyuki Haga	Alice Aprilia Racing	Aprilia	27	+1:01.520	19	2
15	88	(Australia) Andrew Pitt	Kawasaki Racing Team	Kawasaki	27	+1:06.080	21	1
16	45	(United States) Colin Edwards	Alice Aprilia Racing	Aprilia	27	+1:06.630	18	
17	3	(Italy) Max Biaggi	Camel Pramac Pons	Honda	27	+1:14.003	6	
18	9	(Japan) Nobuatsu Aoki	Proton Team KR	Proton KR	26	+1 lap	20	
19	23	(Japan) Ryuichi Kiyonari	Telefónica Movistar Honda	Honda	26	+1 lap	22	
20	35	(United Kingdom) Chris Burns	WCM	Harris WCM	26	+1 lap	24	
Ret	33	(Italy) Marco Melandri	Fortuna Yamaha Team	Yamaha	14	Accident	7	
Ret	4	(Brazil) Alex Barros	Gauloises Yamaha Team	Yamaha	9	Retirement	16	
Ret	12	(Australia) Troy Bayliss	Ducati Marlboro Team	Ducati	3	Accident	4	
Ret	52	(Spain) José David de Gea	WCM	Harris WCM	0	Accident	23	

== 250 cc classification ==
Pos.	No.	Rider	Manufacturer	Laps	Time/Retired	Grid	Points
1	3	(Italy) Roberto Rolfo	Honda	25	45:14.993	8	25
2	14	(Australia) Anthony West	Aprilia	25	+14.040	11	20
3	10	(Spain) Fonsi Nieto	Aprilia	25	+33.511	5	16
4	21	(Italy) Franco Battaini	Aprilia	25	+54.252	3	13
5	6	(Spain) Alex Debón	Honda	25	+1:06.895	13	11
6	8	(Japan) Naoki Matsudo	Yamaha	25	+1:06.943	9	10
7	36	(France) Erwan Nigon	Aprilia	25	+1:13.421	12	9
8	13	(Czech Republic) Jaroslav Huleš	Honda	25	+1:22.119	10	8
9	54	(San Marino) Manuel Poggiali	Aprilia	25	+1:22.163	7	7
10	16	(Sweden) Johan Stigefelt	Aprilia	25	+1:25.303	22	6
11	24	(Spain) Toni Elías	Aprilia	25	+1:41.591	1	5
12	52	(Czech Republic) Lukáš Pešek	Yamaha	25	+2:49.682	18	4
13	28	(Germany) Dirk Heidolf	Aprilia	24	+1 lap	17	3
14	9	(France) Hugo Marchand	Aprilia	24	+1 lap	19	2
15	57	(United Kingdom) Chaz Davies	Aprilia	24	+1 lap	15	1
16	33	(Spain) Héctor Faubel	Aprilia	24	+1 lap	16	
17	18	(Netherlands) Henk vd Lagemaat	Honda	23	+2 laps	25	
18	11	(Spain) Joan Olivé	Aprilia	22	+3 laps	20	
Ret	7	(France) Randy de Puniet	Aprilia	23	Accident	4	
Ret	15	(Germany) Christian Gemmel	Honda	19	Accident	23	
Ret	34	(France) Eric Bataille	Honda	16	Accident	14	
Ret	5	(Argentina) Sebastián Porto	Honda	5	Accident	2	
Ret	98	(Germany) Katja Poensgen	Honda	4	Accident	24	
Ret	79	(Australia) Geoff Hardcastle	Yamaha	4	Retirement	26	
Ret	26	(Italy) Alex Baldolini	Aprilia	2	Accident	21	
Ret	50	(France) Sylvain Guintoli	Aprilia	0	Accident	6	
DNQ	77	(Australia) Mark Rowling	Yamaha		Did not qualify		
DNQ	78	(Australia) Peter Taplin	Honda		Did not qualify		
DNQ	80	(Australia) Rodney Camm	Honda		Did not qualify		
DNQ	76	(Australia) Brett Underwood	Yamaha		Did not qualify		

== 125 cc classification ==
Pos.	No.	Rider	Manufacturer	Laps	Time/Retired	Grid	Points
1	50	(Italy) Andrea Ballerini	Honda	23	43:41.886	23	25
2	8	(Japan) Masao Azuma	Honda	23	+8.849	17	20
3	17	(Germany) Steve Jenkner	Aprilia	23	+14.187	9	16
4	19	(Spain) Álvaro Bautista	Aprilia	23	+14.752	16	13
5	1	(France) Arnaud Vincent	Aprilia	23	+16.387	22	11
6	80	(Spain) Héctor Barberá	Aprilia	23	+22.852	6	10
7	15	(San Marino) Alex de Angelis	Aprilia	23	+23.167	2	9
8	48	(Spain) Jorge Lorenzo	Derbi	23	+39.210	5	8
9	79	(Hungary) Gábor Talmácsi	Aprilia	23	+45.888	14	7
10	88	(Denmark) Robbin Harms	Aprilia	23	+48.500	15	6
11	41	(Japan) Youichi Ui	Gilera	23	+1:07.473	20	5
12	31	(Spain) Julián Simón	Malaguti	23	+1:08.499	28	4
13	32	(Italy) Fabrizio Lai	Malaguti	23	+1:25.817	18	3
14	26	(Spain) Emilio Alzamora	Derbi	23	+1:46.395	27	2
15	33	(Italy) Stefano Bianco	Gilera	23	+1:50.845	25	1
16	12	(Switzerland) Thomas Lüthi	Honda	22	+1 lap	12	
17	28	(Italy) Michele Danese	Honda	22	+1 lap	31	
Ret	25	(Hungary) Imre Tóth	Honda	20	Retirement	29	
Ret	6	(Italy) Mirko Giansanti	Aprilia	19	Accident	7	
Ret	46	(Australia) Matthew Kuhne	Honda	19	Retirement	33	
Ret	7	(Italy) Stefano Perugini	Aprilia	17	Accident	1	
Ret	23	(Italy) Gino Borsoi	Aprilia	17	Retirement	24	
Ret	4	(Italy) Lucio Cecchinello	Aprilia	14	Accident	10	
Ret	22	(Spain) Pablo Nieto	Aprilia	14	Accident	13	
Ret	10	(Italy) Roberto Locatelli	KTM	12	Accident	19	
Ret	36	(Finland) Mika Kallio	KTM	9	Accident	3	
Ret	11	(Italy) Max Sabbatani	Aprilia	8	Retirement	26	
Ret	58	(Italy) Marco Simoncelli	Aprilia	7	Accident	11	
Ret	34	(Italy) Andrea Dovizioso	Honda	6	Retirement	8	
Ret	27	(Australia) Casey Stoner	Aprilia	5	Accident	4	
Ret	44	(Australia) Joshua Waters	Honda	5	Retirement	30	
Ret	63	(France) Mike Di Meglio	Honda	1	Accident	21	
Ret	42	(Italy) Gioele Pellino	Aprilia	1	Retirement	32	
DNS	24	(Italy) Simone Corsi	Honda		Did not start		
DNQ	45	(Australia) Brett Simmonds	Honda		Did not qualify		
WD	3	(Spain) Daniel Pedrosa	Honda		Withdrew		

== Championship standings after the race (MotoGP) ==
Below are the standings for the top five riders and constructors after round fifteen has concluded.

Riders' Championship standings

Pos.	Rider	Points
1	(Italy) Valentino Rossi	332
2	(Spain) Sete Gibernau	257
3	(Italy) Max Biaggi	215
4	(Italy) Loris Capirossi	161
5	(United States) Nicky Hayden	130

Constructors' Championship standings

Pos.	Constructor	Points
1	(Japan) Honda	370
2	(Italy) Ducati	209
3	(Japan) Yamaha	164
4	(Italy) Aprilia	73
5	(Japan) Suzuki	38

- Note: Only the top five positions are included for both sets of standings.

== Notes ==
Previous race: 2003 Malaysian Grand Prix	FIM Grand Prix World Championship; 2003 season	Next race: 2003 Valencian Grand Prix
Previous race: 2002 Australian Grand Prix	Australian motorcycle Grand Prix	Next race: 2004 Australian Grand Prix
