= 2002 Pacific motorcycle Grand Prix =

(Tochigi Prefecture) 2002 Pacific Grand Prix
Race details
- Race 13 of 16 races in the 2002 Grand Prix motorcycle racing season
- Date: 6 October 2002
- Official name: Gauloises Pacific Grand Prix of Motegi
- Location: Twin Ring Motegi
- Course: Permanent racing facility; 4.801 km (2.983 mi)

MotoGP
Pole position
Rider	(Japan) Daijiro Kato	Honda
Time	1:49.052	
Fastest lap
Rider	(Brazil) Alex Barros	Honda
Time	1:49.947 on lap 24	
Podium
First	(Brazil) Alex Barros	Honda
Second	(Italy) Valentino Rossi	Honda
Third	(Italy) Loris Capirossi	Honda

250cc
Pole position
Rider	(Spain) Fonsi Nieto	Aprilia
Time	1:52.389	
Fastest lap
Rider	(Spain) Toni Elías	Aprilia
Time	1:53.392 on lap 22	
Podium
First	(Spain) Toni Elías	Aprilia
Second	(Italy) Marco Melandri	Aprilia
Third	(Japan) Yuki Takahashi	Honda

125cc
Pole position
Rider	(Spain) Daniel Pedrosa	Honda
Time	1:58.026	
Fastest lap
Rider	(Spain) Daniel Pedrosa	Honda
Time	1:58.354 on lap 12	
Podium
First	(Spain) Daniel Pedrosa	Honda
Second	(San Marino) Manuel Poggiali	Gilera
Third	(Germany) Steve Jenkner	Aprilia

The 2002 Pacific motorcycle Grand Prix was the thirteenth round of the 2002 MotoGP Championship. It took place on the weekend of 4–6 October 2002 at the Twin Ring Motegi circuit.

== MotoGP classification ==
Pos.	No.	Rider	Team	Manufacturer	Laps	Time/Retired	Grid	Points
1	4	(Brazil) Alex Barros	West Honda Pons	Honda	24	44:18.913	5	25
2	46	(Italy) Valentino Rossi	Repsol Honda Team	Honda	24	+1.641	6	20
3	65	(Italy) Loris Capirossi	West Honda Pons	Honda	24	+7.672	3	16
4	11	(Japan) Tohru Ukawa	Repsol Honda Team	Honda	24	+18.120	7	13
5	7	(Spain) Carlos Checa	Marlboro Yamaha Team	Yamaha	24	+25.036	4	11
6	10	(United States) Kenny Roberts Jr.	Telefónica Movistar Suzuki	Suzuki	24	+29.201	8	10
7	19	(France) Olivier Jacque	Gauloises Yamaha Tech 3	Yamaha	24	+32.902	9	9
8	6	(Japan) Norifumi Abe	Antena 3 Yamaha d'Antín	Yamaha	24	+33.287	14	8
9	9	(Japan) Nobuatsu Aoki	Proton Team KR	Proton KR	24	+35.949	13	7
10	99	(United Kingdom) Jeremy McWilliams	Proton Team KR	Proton KR	24	+37.355	10	6
11	55	(France) Régis Laconi	MS Aprilia Racing	Aprilia	24	+49.039	12	5
12	45	(Japan) Wataru Yoshikawa	Yamaha Racing Team	Yamaha	24	+49.181	19	4
13	17	(Netherlands) Jurgen van den Goorbergh	Kanemoto Racing	Honda	24	+49.589	20	3
14	21	(United States) John Hopkins	Red Bull Yamaha WCM	Yamaha	24	+52.071	16	2
15	31	(Japan) Tetsuya Harada	Pramac Honda Racing Team	Honda	24	+52.180	21	1
16	56	(Japan) Shinya Nakano	Gauloises Yamaha Tech 3	Yamaha	24	+1:00.485	17	
17	8	(Australia) Garry McCoy	Red Bull Yamaha WCM	Yamaha	24	+1:02.232	15	
Ret (18)	3	(Italy) Max Biaggi	Marlboro Yamaha Team	Yamaha	15	Retirement	2	
Ret (19)	74	(Japan) Daijiro Kato	Fortuna Honda Gresini	Honda	8	Retirement	1	
Ret (20)	48	(Japan) Akira Yanagawa	Kawasaki Racing Team	Kawasaki	6	Accident	18	
Ret (21)	15	(Spain) Sete Gibernau	Telefónica Movistar Suzuki	Suzuki	5	Retirement	11	
DNS	20	(Spain) Pere Riba	Antena 3 Yamaha d'Antín	Yamaha	0	Did not start	22	

== 250 cc classification ==
Pos.	No.	Rider	Manufacturer	Laps	Time/Retired	Grid	Points
1	24	(Spain) Toni Elías	Aprilia	23	43:52.991	5	25
2	3	(Italy) Marco Melandri	Aprilia	23	+0.175	2	20
3	72	(Japan) Yuki Takahashi	Honda	23	+4.431	4	16
4	10	(Spain) Fonsi Nieto	Aprilia	23	+8.200	1	13
5	7	(Spain) Emilio Alzamora	Honda	23	+8.812	7	11
6	4	(Italy) Roberto Rolfo	Honda	23	+9.826	8	10
7	21	(Italy) Franco Battaini	Aprilia	23	+11.828	9	9
8	9	(Argentina) Sebastián Porto	Yamaha	23	+12.726	6	8
9	15	(Italy) Roberto Locatelli	Aprilia	23	+26.167	17	7
10	6	(Spain) Alex Debón	Aprilia	23	+32.236	10	6
11	92	(Japan) Hiroshi Aoyama	Honda	23	+32.378	13	5
12	71	(Japan) Katsuyuki Nakasuga	Yamaha	23	+39.383	19	4
13	11	(Japan) Haruchika Aoki	Honda	23	+39.647	20	3
14	70	(Japan) Ryuji Yokoe	Yamaha	23	+41.386	16	2
15	13	(Czech Republic) Jaroslav Huleš	Yamaha	23	+46.952	18	1
16	8	(Japan) Naoki Matsudo	Yamaha	23	+52.179	12	
17	27	(Australia) Casey Stoner	Aprilia	23	+52.663	21	
18	18	(Malaysia) Shahrol Yuzy	Yamaha	23	+54.119	11	
19	12	(United Kingdom) Jay Vincent	Honda	23	+54.765	22	
20	28	(Germany) Dirk Heidolf	Aprilia	23	+59.082	25	
21	42	(Spain) David Checa	Aprilia	23	+59.500	24	
22	32	(Spain) Héctor Faubel	Aprilia	23	+1:21.658	27	
23	36	(France) Erwan Nigon	Aprilia	23	+1:34.406	29	
24	96	(Czech Republic) Jakub Smrž	Honda	23	+1:49.925	28	
Ret (25)	68	(Japan) Tekkyu Kayo	Yamaha	19	Retirement	15	
Ret (26)	51	(France) Hugo Marchand	Aprilia	12	Retirement	23	
Ret (27)	19	(United Kingdom) Leon Haslam	Honda	12	Retirement	26	
Ret (28)	22	(Spain) Raúl Jara	Aprilia	9	Retirement	30	
Ret (29)	17	(France) Randy de Puniet	Aprilia	3	Retirement	3	
Ret (30)	69	(Japan) Nobuyuki Ohsaki	Yamaha	0	Retirement	14	

== 125 cc classification ==
Pos.	No.	Rider	Manufacturer	Laps	Time/Retired	Grid	Points
1	26	(Spain) Daniel Pedrosa	Honda	21	41:43.377	1	25
2	1	(San Marino) Manuel Poggiali	Gilera	21	+8.071	2	20
3	17	(Germany) Steve Jenkner	Aprilia	21	+8.701	3	16
4	22	(Spain) Pablo Nieto	Aprilia	21	+15.425	7	13
5	80	(Spain) Héctor Barberá	Aprilia	21	+24.565	8	11
6	36	(Finland) Mika Kallio	Honda	21	+29.584	17	10
7	23	(Italy) Gino Borsoi	Aprilia	21	+33.107	9	9
8	25	(Spain) Joan Olivé	Honda	21	+34.920	22	8
9	48	(Spain) Jorge Lorenzo	Derbi	21	+36.050	12	7
10	97	(Japan) Hideyuki Nakajoh	Honda	21	+36.447	26	6
11	66	(Japan) Shuhei Aoyama	Honda	21	+40.056	21	5
12	41	(Japan) Youichi Ui	Derbi	21	+44.663	13	4
13	84	(Italy) Michel Fabrizio	Gilera	21	+49.699	14	3
14	6	(Italy) Mirko Giansanti	Honda	21	+50.072	18	2
15	21	(France) Arnaud Vincent	Aprilia	21	+52.708	4	1
16	95	(Japan) Takashi Yasuda	Honda	21	+1:00.232	24	
17	33	(Italy) Stefano Bianco	Aprilia	21	+1:00.548	15	
18	5	(Japan) Masao Azuma	Honda	21	+1:01.741	11	
19	11	(Italy) Max Sabbatani	Aprilia	21	+1:04.115	20	
20	7	(Italy) Stefano Perugini	Italjet	21	+1:07.131	30	
21	8	(Hungary) Gábor Talmácsi	Honda	21	+1:07.170	25	
22	50	(Italy) Andrea Ballerini	Aprilia	21	+1:07.781	32	
23	20	(Hungary) Imre Tóth	Honda	21	+1:11.559	34	
24	57	(United Kingdom) Chaz Davies	Aprilia	21	+1:21.111	35	
25	12	(Germany) Klaus Nöhles	Honda	21	+1:27.070	29	
26	19	(Italy) Alex Baldolini	Aprilia	21	+1:33.030	37	
27	9	(Japan) Noboru Ueda	Honda	21	+1:48.799	23	
28	31	(Italy) Mattia Angeloni	Gilera	19	+2 laps	31	
Ret (29)	65	(Japan) Toshihisa Kuzuhara	Honda	20	Accident	27	
Ret (30)	4	(Italy) Lucio Cecchinello	Aprilia	18	Retirement	6	
Ret (31)	16	(Italy) Simone Sanna	Aprilia	13	Retirement	16	
Ret (32)	15	(San Marino) Alex de Angelis	Aprilia	10	Accident	19	
Ret (33)	68	(Japan) Akira Komuro	Honda	6	Accident	33	
Ret (34)	72	(Germany) Dario Giuseppetti	Honda	6	Accident	28	
Ret (35)	42	(Italy) Christian Pistoni	Italjet	4	Retirement	36	
Ret (36)	34	(Italy) Andrea Dovizioso	Honda	1	Accident	5	
Ret (37)	67	(Japan) Hideyuki Ogata	Honda	0	Accident	10	

== Championship standings after the race (MotoGP) ==
Below are the standings for the top five riders and constructors after round thirteen has concluded.

Riders' Championship standings

Pos.	Rider	Points
1	(Italy) Valentino Rossi	290
2	(Japan) Tohru Ukawa	169
3	(Italy) Max Biaggi	164
4	(Brazil) Alex Barros	143
5	(Spain) Carlos Checa	127

Constructors' Championship standings

Pos.	Constructor	Points
1	(Japan) Honda	320
2	(Japan) Yamaha	221
3	(Japan) Suzuki	125
4	(Malaysia) / (United States) Proton KR	75
5	(Italy) Aprilia	33

- Note: Only the top five positions are included for both sets of standings.

Previous race: 2002 Rio de Janeiro Grand Prix	FIM Grand Prix World Championship; 2002 season	Next race: 2002 Malaysian Grand Prix
Previous race: 2001 Pacific Grand Prix	Pacific motorcycle Grand Prix	Next race: 2003 Pacific Grand Prix
