= 2004 Australian motorcycle Grand Prix =

(Australia) 2004 Australian Grand Prix
Race details
- Race 15 of 16 races in the 2004 Grand Prix motorcycle racing season
- Date: 17 October 2004
- Official name: Cinzano Australian Grand Prix
- Location: Phillip Island Grand Prix Circuit
- Course: Permanent racing facility; 4.448 km (2.764 mi)

MotoGP
Pole position
- Rider: (Spain) Sete Gibernau
- Time: 1:30.122
Fastest lap
- Rider: (Italy) Loris Capirossi
- Time: 1:31.102 on lap 6
Podium
- First: (Italy) Valentino Rossi
- Second: (Spain) Sete Gibernau
- Third: (Italy) Loris Capirossi

250cc
Pole position
- Rider: (Argentina) Sebastián Porto
- Time: 1:32.099
Fastest lap
- Rider: (Argentina) Sebastián Porto
- Time: 1:33.381 on lap 4
Podium
- First: (Argentina) Sebastián Porto
- Second: (San Marino) Alex de Angelis
- Third: (San Marino) Manuel Poggiali

125cc
Pole position
- Rider: (Italy) Roberto Locatelli
- Time: 1:37.417
Fastest lap
- Rider: (Italy) Andrea Dovizioso
- Time: 1:38.024 on lap 7
Podium
- First: (Italy) Andrea Dovizioso
- Second: (Spain) Jorge Lorenzo
- Third: (Australia) Casey Stoner

The 2004 Australian motorcycle Grand Prix was the penultimate round of the 2004 MotoGP Championship. It took place on the weekend of 15–17 October 2004 at the Phillip Island Grand Prix Circuit.

== MotoGP race report ==
This race was most notable for the last-lap battle between Sete Gibernau and Valentino Rossi for victory, as well as Rossi's subsequent crowning as world champion - clinching his sixth overall world title, fourth premier-class title and third back-to-back MotoGP title as a result.

After fourteen rounds, Valentino Rossi is narrowly leading the hunt with 254 points. Close second is Sete Gibernau with 224 points and further behind is Max Biaggi in third with 188 points. Rossi has the first opportunity to win the 2004 MotoGP world championship if he finishes second or higher to secure the title, regardless of Gibernau's finish. Gibernau in turn need to score six points more than Rossi to keep his title fight alive.

For 2004 the MotoGP Safety Commission advised to make some changes to improve the safety on the circuit. As such, the Government of Victoria and the Australian logistics and supply chain business Linfox, who purchased the circuit in the same year, invested a two million Australian dollars to execute these changes in two months. The changes involved the extension of the pit lane entry and exit, as well as enlarging existing gravel traps so no changes were made to the fast, flowing lay-out of the circuit itself.

Before the start of the race, the now annual Barry Sheene Tribute Ride took place to commemorate the British rider, who had died due to cancer the previous year. Several hundred motorcyclists and some local press were present, as well as Sheene's former teammate Steve Parrish and his then fifteen-year-old son Freddie Sheene as civilian passenger. It was also revealed that Colin Edwards would move from the Telefónica Movistar Honda to the Gauloises Yamaha Team to partner Valentino Rossi for the 2005 season. He will be replacing Carlos Checa who will be going to the Ducati Marlboro Team for next season.

It is Sete Gibernau who fired the first shot on Saturday, taking pole position with a time of 1:30.122. +0.100 seconds behind is Valentino Rossi, who will be starting just behind the Spaniard and in third is Loris Capirossi who is +0.491 seconds behind. The second row of the grid consists out of Colin Edwards in fourth, Makoto Tamada in fifth and Alex Barros in sixth place. Suzuki test rider Gregorio Lavilla replaces the injured Kenny Roberts Jr. who is still recovering from his elbow injuries he sustained after a first-lap collision on the opening lap of the Japanese round. Garry McCoy also replaces Shane Byrne who is still recovering from wrist damage he sustained during a practice highside at the Czech round where he suffered ligament and tendon damage.

All riders take off and do their usual warm-up lap before lining up in their respective grid slots. As the lights go out, Capirossi gets a great start and immediately slingshots past to take the lead going into Doohan Corner (Turn 1). Rossi manages to remain in second whilst Troy Bayliss has a really good start and manages to get up into fourth spot, almost overtaking Gibernau in the process. Gibernau initially gets off the line relatively well but loses out on the front two, opening up a small gap to Rossi and almost losing the position to Bayliss. Barros makes up one position as he gets away, fighting with sixth place Max Biaggi who managed to briefly overtake teammate Tamada before getting swallowed up again in the pack as Tamada exiting the turn on the opening lap. At the entrance of the Southern Loop, Gibernau has practically nullified the gap and even manages to pass Rossi on the outside exiting the turn, snatching second from him. Further back, Colin Edwards is slowly clawing back his way up the field after losing out to both Camel Honda riders initially, going up Tamada's inside and taking sixth position. Entering Stoner Corner (Turn 3), Gibernau has a look up the inside of Capirossi but stays behind for now. As Rossi is blocked by Capirossi, Bayliss then manages to sneak past around the outside and take third. At the Honda Corner (Turn 4), Gibernau makes a lunge up the inside of Capirossi and takes the lead as Rossi tries to go around the outside of Bayliss but gets blocked off and has to stay behind. Further back, Biaggi - who had overtaken Tamada before - also makes a move down Edward's inside to take sixth position. Exiting the hairpin, Gibernau immediately starts to open up a gap to Capirossi as Rossi hounds Bayliss through Siberia (Turn 6) but almost loses fourth himself to Barros behind him at the entry of the fast unnamed Turn 7. At the exit of that turn, Rossi then tries to line up a pass going into Hayshed (Turn 8) but goes too wide and runs off-track, not crashing out by miracle and even manages to get a great run on Bayliss at Lukey Heights (Turn 9) to make a lunge pass at MG (Turn 10) on the home hero as well as Capirossi for third position. Exiting the hairpin, Bayliss looks to be making a move around the outside of teammate Capirossi at the unnamed Turn 11 but thinks better of it and stays behind for now. Gibernau is still way ahead in front as Rossi is also starting to open up a small gap to the fighting pair of the Marlboro Ducati's. Exiting Turn 12, Barros is close behind Bayliss.

On lap two, Barros almost goes side by side with Bayliss at the Gardner Straight but his superior power preventing him from fully doing that, instead the Repsol Honda rider lines himself up on the outside of Bayliss at Doohan Corner to then try and get the inside line at the Southern Loop but gets blocked and has to stay behind. Biaggi meanwhile is now coming under pressure from Edwards at both Doohan Corner and the Southern Loop, the American trying to pass him around the outside. Rossi meanwhile is still opening up his advantage to the Ducati duo. Gibernau's gap back to Rossi was +1.195 seconds in sector one but has increased to +1.222 seconds in sector two. Barros is close at Lukey Heights, then dives down the inside of Bayliss at MG, moving him up to fourth place. Gibernau's gap back to Rossi has decreased slightly to +1.107 in sector three. Also at MG, Marco Melandri tries to take seventh position from Edwards around the outside but fails and has to stay behind at the exit.

Lap three and Rossi sets the fastest lap of the race. At Doohan Corner, Biaggi manages to pass Bayliss for fifth place. At Honda Corner, Melandri goes up the inside of Edwards and takes seventh place, with Nicky Hayden behind him trying a move around the outside but going wide upon entry, losing ninth to Tamada in turn. At Turn 8, Edwards manages to retake seventh position. In sector two, Gibernau's gap back to Rossi was +1.062 seconds. In sector three, this gap has decreased slightly to +0.901 seconds.

On lap four, Rossi sets the fastest lap, only for Barros to snatch it away. Fourth place Barros is still right behind Capirossi at the Gardner Straight but is unable to make a move entering Doohan Corner. Rossi is slowly closing the gap and Barros tries to go down the inside of Capirossi at MG but is once again unable to get past.

Lap five and Barros is right behind Capirossi at the Gardner Straight but cannot get by Capirossi due to the Ducati's superior top speed. Barros sets the fastest lap as well. Gibernau's gap back to Rossi was +0.703 seconds at the start/finish straight but that has already been reduced to +0.487 seconds in sector one. Barros has now also broken the circuit record with a time of 1:31.309, beating Rossi's 2003 record of 1:31.421 with +0.112 seconds.

On lap six, the top six is as follows: Gibernau, Rossi, Capirossi, Barros, Biaggi and Bayliss. Exiting Stoner Corner, sparks can be seen at the bottom of Rossi's bike as he pushes at the max to close the gap to Gibernau. Barros is once again very close coming into Honda Corner but still cannot get past Capirossi. Replacement rider Garry McCoy has come into the pits to retire with technical issues. At MG, Barros is still right behind but cannot get side by side with the Italian.

Lap seven and Capirossi sets the fastest lap of the race. Rossi has almost caught up to Gibernau with Capirossi closing the gap to him also. Barros tries to pass Capirossi around the outside but gets blocked and has to stay behind still.

On lap eight, Rossi has fully caught Gibernau by now. Barros is still right behind Capirossi but caouldn't get past.

Lap nine and Bayliss manages to get side by side with Biaggi on the Gardner Straight, going past entering Doohan Corner for fifth spot. Biaggi tries to hang on and retake the position at the Southern Loop but isn't quite able to. James Ellison is entering the pits

On lap ten, Gibernau has a slight moment exiting the Southern Loop but doesn't lose any time or position from it. At Stoner Corner, Barros is very close and at Honda Corner, Barros finally manages to get by Capirossi thanks to a late lunge on his inside, outbraking him and taking third as a result. He then starts to open a small gap in pursuit of the top two riders.

Lap eleven and Rossi makes a lunge entering Doohan Corner to close up to Gibernau in front of him. Gibernau's gap back to Rossi is only +0.232 seconds. Rossi's gap to Barros was +0.952 seconds in sector two, increasing to +1.001 seconds in sector three.

On lap twelve, Edwards goes up the inside of Biaggi at the entrance of Doohan Corner, taking fifth place.

Lap thirteen and Rossi attempts a move on Gibernau's inside at the entry of the Southern Loop but is too far and thus has to stay behind. No overtakes happened at the front.

On lap fourteen - the halfway point of the race -, Biaggi has managed to take back sixth position from Edwards entering Doohan Corner. At the entrance of the Southern Loop, Biaggi then attempts a move on the inside of Bayliss for fifth but thinks better of it. At MG, Biaggi then lunges up his inside, promoting him up to fifth place.

Lap fifteen and Edwards has also managed to get ahead of a now struggling Bayliss, taking sixth place.

On lap sixteen, the top six is as follows: Gibernau, Rossi, Barros, Capirossi, Biaggi and Edwards. Exiting Stoner Corner, sparks fly off of Rossi's Yamaha YZR-M1 again. Rossi's gap back to Barros is +2.190 seconds. At MG, Tamada goes up in seventh after diving down the inside of Bayliss at MG.

Lap seventeen and Rossi is still right behind Gibernau, harassing him all throughout the lap. Before MG, Hayden managed to pass Bayliss for eighth position. Melandri has retired from the race, the Italian sitting in pit box disappointed.

On lap eighteen, Gibernau is still in the lead with Rossi right behind him. No overtakes happened at the front.

Lap nineteen and Rossi makes his move, going side by side with Gibernau at the Gardner Straight and taking over the lead for the first time in the race. Rossi's gap to Gibernau was -0.060 seconds at the start/finish straight and is now +0.144 seconds in sector one. In sector two, that gap increases to +0.231 seconds and in sector three, the gap increases again to +0.307 seconds.

On lap twenty, Hayden goes up the inside of Tamada at the inside of the Southern Loop to take seventh spot. Just ahead, Edwards is also tries a move around the outside at the same corner but gets blocked by Biaggi and has to settle for sixth for now.

Lap twenty-one and Rossi is still ahead, Gibernau in second and Barros back in third. At the Honda Corner, Rossi has a slight moment and goes a tad wide, allowing Gibernau to almost go up the inside of Rossi and snatch the lead back. However, Rossi blocks him off and retains the lead.

On lap twenty-two, Edwards has passed Biaggi entering Doohan Corner for fifth place, with Hayden trying a move as well. He tries to go side by side with the Italian at the entry of the Southern Loop but Biaggi blocks his path and forces him to stay behind.

Lap twenty-three and Gibernau overtakes Rossi by going side by side with him at the Gardner Straight, taking first position entering Doohan Corner. Hayden almost manages to get up the inside of Biaggi for fifth at MG but has to stay behind for now.

On lap twenty-four, Capirossi has managed to close the gap to a now struggling Barros. At the end of the Gardner Straight, Capirossi manages to pass Barros and get back into fourth position. The pair comes up to a backmarker - James Haydon - which goes out of the way at MG without causing any troubles.

Lap twenty-five and Rossi has closed up at the Honda Corner but is not able to overtake Gibernau. He has another look at the exit of Lukey Heights but Gibernau blocks him off before he can make a lunge.

On lap twenty-six, the penultimate lap of the race, Gibernau still leads but Rossi is all over the back of him. At Lukey Heights the duo encounters another backmarker, this time being Nobuatsu Aoki. He gets out of the way at Lukey Heights, causing no troubles for the frontrunners.

Gibernau crosses the line to start the last lap - lap thirty - and Rossi goes up the inside of Gibernau at the Southern Loop to take the lead. At Honda Corner however, Rossi runs wide and gifts the position back to Gibernau, trying to fight back upon exit but not being able to take the place. At Lukey Heights, Rossi tries a move on his inside but isn't quite able to get by. However, Gibernau runs a bit wide at the exit of the uphill corner and Rossi takes the place anyway as he takes a tight line through the corner. He blocks the possibility for overtaking at MG for Gibernau, staying in front going up to Turn 11. Gibernau tries to get him on speed but comes short, allowing Rossi to cross the line and win the race - his eighth of the season - with Gibernau a close second. Capirossi comes home in third place as Barros gets pipped to the line by Edwards who takes fourth, the Brazilian having to settle for fifth. Hayden comes home in sixth position.

On the parade lap back to parc-fermé, Rossi puts his arms on his head, barely believing the feat he had just accomplished, shaking his head also. He then kisses his bike and gives it some pats as well as a brushing with the hand as a symbolic gesture to the Yamaha he just won the title with. He puts his arm up in the air as a sign of total victory, with backmarker Nobuatsu Aoki riding next to him to congratulate him on his victory. He then puts his arms on his head again before they both go up in the air while both Capirossi and Taamada ride next to him to congratulate him as well. As Checa stops next to Rossi to congratulate him also, 'The Doctor' gets swarmed by fans who invaded the track as well as photographers who circle around him. One of his crewmembers also arrives to hug and celebrate with him. Rossi steps off his bike to continue his celebrations. As he steps on his bike again and gets going, the fans and photographers continue to run with and after him, revealing they had dressed him up in a shirt that reads "Che spettacolo" meaning "What a spectacle" in Italian. They also put this on his helmet. He puts his arms up at the fans one more time as he rides into the pits now to get to parc-fermé.

Gibernau is the first to actually arrive back to parc-fermé, stepping off his bike and looking at his rear tyre to see how badly it had grained. He takes off his gloves, as well as his helmet, to reveal an angry Gibernau walking towards his Telefónica Movistar Honda crew. Capirossi has also arrived at parc-fermé, stepping off his bike and happily walking over to celebrate with his crew. After lengthy celebrations, Rossi then arrives, gets off the bike and goes to his crew to celebrate with them. One of the Ducati crewmembers shakes Rossi's hands and Capirossi hugs Rossi as well. Gibernau looks at him as he gets interviewed by the media, Rossi then taking off his helmet to show his locks to everyone. As Rossi takes off various other things and puts on his cap, he puts his helmet in the air with his arm as Gibernau looks on, still being interviewed. The Italian now goes to one of the reporters and also gets interviewed by the media. After the interviews, Rossi and Gibernau give each other a cold handshake, the Spaniard doing likewise to some of the Yamaha crew.

All riders make their way to the podium, the fans start to sing "Vale! Vale!" in droves. First one to appear is Capirossi, followed by Gibernau and then Rossi, who kisses his helmet as he arrives. The fans cheer for him as he steps onto the podium. All the riders receive their trophies, Rossi kissing his and holding it next to it before holding it above his head in glee. The champagne then gets handed out by the podium girls, Rossi cheekily spraying one of the girls as well as Capirossi. Gibernau immediately sprays it into the crowd as Capirossi also sprays Rossi.

Rossi's win, Gibernau's second and Biaggi's seventh position gives Rossi an unassailable lead with one round remaining. As such, he is crowned 2004 MotoGP World Champion with 279 points. Second is Gibernau with 244 and third is Biaggi with 197 points.

== MotoGP classification ==
Pos.	No.	Rider	Team	Manufacturer	Laps	Time/Retired	Grid	Points
1	46	(Italy) Valentino Rossi	Gauloises Fortuna Yamaha	Yamaha	27	41:25.819	2	25
2	15	(Spain) Sete Gibernau	Telefónica Movistar Honda MotoGP	Honda	27	+0.097	1	20
3	65	(Italy) Loris Capirossi	Ducati Marlboro Team	Ducati	27	+10.486	3	16
4	45	(United States) Colin Edwards	Telefónica Movistar Honda MotoGP	Honda	27	+10.817	4	13
5	4	(Brazil) Alex Barros	Repsol Honda Team	Honda	27	+10.851	6	11
6	69	(United States) Nicky Hayden	Repsol Honda Team	Honda	27	+12.210	14	10
7	3	(Italy) Max Biaggi	Camel Honda	Honda	27	+12.847	7	9
8	6	(Japan) Makoto Tamada	Camel Honda	Honda	27	+12.965	5	8
9	12	(Australia) Troy Bayliss	Ducati Marlboro Team	Ducati	27	+18.607	9	7
10	7	(Spain) Carlos Checa	Gauloises Fortuna Yamaha	Yamaha	27	+21.245	13	6
11	11	(Spain) Rubén Xaus	D'Antin MotoGP	Ducati	27	+23.173	12	5
12	56	(Japan) Shinya Nakano	Kawasaki Racing Team	Kawasaki	27	+25.718	11	4
13	66	(Germany) Alex Hofmann	Kawasaki Racing Team	Kawasaki	27	+35.137	8	3
14	99	(United Kingdom) Jeremy McWilliams	MS Aprilia Racing	Aprilia	27	+45.155	15	2
15	21	(United States) John Hopkins	Team Suzuki MotoGP	Suzuki	27	+45.197	17	1
16	32	(Spain) Gregorio Lavilla	Team Suzuki MotoGP	Suzuki	27	+52.205	16	
17	17	(Japan) Norifumi Abe	Fortuna Gauloises Tech 3	Yamaha	27	+52.665	18	
18	50	(United Kingdom) Neil Hodgson	D'Antin MotoGP	Ducati	27	+1:11.394	19	
19	9	(Japan) Nobuatsu Aoki	Proton Team KR	Proton KR	26	+1 lap	21	
20	36	(United Kingdom) James Haydon	Proton Team KR	Proton KR	26	+1 lap	22	
21	41	(Japan) Youichi Ui	WCM	Harris WCM	26	+1 lap	24	
22	77	(United Kingdom) James Ellison	WCM	Harris WCM	24	+3 laps	23	
Ret	33	(Italy) Marco Melandri	Fortuna Gauloises Tech 3	Yamaha	15	Retirement	10	
Ret	24	(Australia) Garry McCoy	MS Aprilia Racing	Aprilia	4	Retirement	20	

== 250 cc classification ==
Pos.	No.	Rider	Manufacturer	Laps	Time/Retired	Grid	Points
1	19	(Argentina) Sebastián Porto	Aprilia	25	39:24.604	1	25
2	51	(San Marino) Alex de Angelis	Aprilia	25	+5.941	2	20
3	54	(San Marino) Manuel Poggiali	Aprilia	25	+13.289	3	16
4	26	(Spain) Daniel Pedrosa	Honda	25	+14.966	4	13
5	24	(Spain) Toni Elías	Honda	25	+46.083	9	11
6	57	(United Kingdom) Chaz Davies	Aprilia	25	+55.140	10	10
7	73	(Japan) Hiroshi Aoyama	Honda	25	+1:01.014	7	9
8	50	(France) Sylvain Guintoli	Aprilia	25	+1:04.684	13	8
9	16	(Sweden) Johan Stigefelt	Aprilia	25	+1:07.656	12	7
10	2	(Italy) Roberto Rolfo	Honda	25	+1:09.889	17	6
11	6	(Spain) Alex Debón	Honda	25	+1:13.572	11	5
12	9	(France) Hugo Marchand	Aprilia	25	+1:13.608	19	4
13	96	(Czech Republic) Jakub Smrž	Honda	25	+1:14.681	14	3
14	52	(Spain) José David de Gea	Honda	25	+1:21.473	18	2
15	8	(Japan) Naoki Matsudo	Yamaha	25	+1:21.515	15	1
16	33	(Spain) Héctor Faubel	Aprilia	25	+1:26.860	26	
17	42	(France) Grégory Leblanc	Aprilia	25	+1:30.317	22	
18	82	(Australia) Joshua Waters	Honda	24	+1 lap	27	
19	43	(Czech Republic) Radomil Rous	Yamaha	24	+1 lap	23	
Ret	28	(Germany) Dirk Heidolf	Aprilia	21	Retirement	24	
Ret	25	(Italy) Alex Baldolini	Aprilia	17	Accident	20	
Ret	11	(Spain) Joan Olivé	Aprilia	15	Retirement	21	
Ret	44	(Japan) Taro Sekiguchi	Yamaha	12	Retirement	25	
Ret	21	(Italy) Franco Battaini	Aprilia	7	Retirement	8	
Ret	7	(France) Randy de Puniet	Aprilia	4	Accident	5	
Ret	10	(Spain) Fonsi Nieto	Aprilia	0	Accident	6	
DSQ	36	(France) Erwan Nigon	Aprilia	10	Black flag	16	
DNS	14	(Australia) Anthony West	Aprilia		Did not start		
DNQ	88	(Hungary) Gergő Talmácsi	Yamaha		Did not qualify		
DNQ	81	(Australia) Mark Rowling	Yamaha		Did not qualify		
DNQ	80	(Australia) Peter Taplin	Honda		Did not qualify		
DNQ	84	(Australia) Ben Ried	Yamaha		Did not qualify		

== 125 cc classification ==
Pos.	No.	Rider	Manufacturer	Laps	Time/Retired	Grid	Points
1	34	(Italy) Andrea Dovizioso	Honda	23	38:01.877	5	25
2	48	(Spain) Jorge Lorenzo	Derbi	23	+0.123	2	20
3	27	(Australia) Casey Stoner	KTM	23	+0.123	3	16
4	15	(Italy) Roberto Locatelli	Aprilia	23	+2.480	1	13
5	21	(Germany) Steve Jenkner	Aprilia	23	+5.336	4	11
6	3	(Spain) Héctor Barberá	Aprilia	23	+5.415	8	10
7	23	(Italy) Gino Borsoi	Aprilia	23	+5.448	6	9
8	63	(France) Mike Di Meglio	Aprilia	23	+17.976	16	8
9	19	(Spain) Álvaro Bautista	Aprilia	23	+18.404	24	7
10	33	(Spain) Sergio Gadea	Aprilia	23	+18.427	14	6
11	14	(Hungary) Gábor Talmácsi	Malaguti	23	+18.501	12	5
12	52	(Czech Republic) Lukáš Pešek	Honda	23	+18.530	11	4
13	6	(Italy) Mirko Giansanti	Aprilia	23	+18.739	9	3
14	50	(Italy) Andrea Ballerini	Aprilia	23	+19.331	19	2
15	22	(Spain) Pablo Nieto	Aprilia	23	+19.826	13	1
16	24	(Italy) Simone Corsi	Honda	23	+27.971	21	
17	42	(Italy) Gioele Pellino	Aprilia	23	+27.983	29	
18	54	(Italy) Mattia Pasini	Aprilia	23	+27.996	23	
19	12	(Switzerland) Thomas Lüthi	Honda	23	+28.006	22	
20	10	(Spain) Julián Simón	Honda	23	+28.892	10	
21	25	(Hungary) Imre Tóth	Aprilia	23	+40.943	20	
22	26	(Germany) Dario Giuseppetti	Honda	23	+41.080	26	
23	66	(Finland) Vesa Kallio	Aprilia	23	+48.127	27	
24	45	(Italy) Lorenzo Zanetti	Aprilia	23	+55.439	25	
25	31	(Italy) Max Sabbatani	Honda	23	+1:28.474	33	
26	16	(Netherlands) Raymond Schouten	Honda	23	+1:28.656	32	
27	46	(Australia) Matthew Kuhne	Honda	23	+1:28.730	30	
28	28	(Spain) Jordi Carchano	Aprilia	23	+1:36.917	34	
29	92	(Australia) Bryan Staring	Honda	20	+3 laps	31	
Ret	36	(Finland) Mika Kallio	KTM	17	Retirement	7	
Ret	7	(Italy) Stefano Perugini	Gilera	11	Accident	15	
Ret	32	(Italy) Fabrizio Lai	Gilera	11	Accident	18	
Ret	8	(Italy) Manuel Manna	Malaguti	7	Retirement	28	
Ret	47	(Spain) Ángel Rodríguez	Derbi	6	Retirement	17	
DNQ	94	(Australia) Brent Rigoli	Honda		Did not qualify		
DNQ	93	(Australia) Malcolm Esler	Honda		Did not qualify		
DNQ	56	(Australia) Brett Simmonds	Honda		Did not qualify		

== Championship standings after the race (MotoGP) ==
Below are the standings for the top five riders and constructors after round fifteen has concluded.

Riders' Championship standings

Pos.	Rider	Points
1	(Italy) Valentino Rossi	279
2	(Spain) Sete Gibernau	244
3	(Italy) Max Biaggi	197
4	(Brazil) Alex Barros	155
5	(United States) Colin Edwards	149

Constructors' Championship standings

Pos.	Constructor	Points
1	(Japan) Honda	335
2	(Japan) Yamaha	303
3	(Italy) Ducati	153
4	(Japan) Kawasaki	86
5	(Japan) Suzuki	69

- Note: Only the top five positions are included for both sets of standings.

Previous race: 2004 Malaysian Grand Prix	FIM Grand Prix World Championship; 2004 season	Next race: 2004 Valencian Grand Prix
Previous race: 2003 Australian Grand Prix	Australian motorcycle Grand Prix	Next race: 2005 Australian Grand Prix
