= Andrea Ballerini =

Italian motorcycle racer

- Nationality: Italian
Motorcycle racing career statistics
Grand Prix motorcycle racing
Active years	1995 - 1996, 1998, 2001 - 2006
First race	1995 125cc Austrian Grand Prix
Last race	2006 250cc Valencia Grand Prix
First win	2003 125cc Australian Grand Prix
Last win	2003 125cc Australian Grand Prix
Starts / Wins / Podiums / Poles / F. laps / Points; 99 / 1 / 1 / 0 / 1 / 152.5

Andrea Ballerini (born 2 July 1973) is an Italian former Grand Prix motorcycle road racer.

Ballerini was born in Florence. In 2001, he won the European 125cc road racing championship. His best year in the world championships was in 2006, when he finished in 17th place in the 125cc world championship. In 2003, Ballerini won the 125cc Australian Grand Prix.

== Career statistics ==
=== CIV 125cc Championship ===
==== Races by year ====
(key) (Races in bold indicate pole position; races in italics indicate fastest lap)

Year	Bike	1	2	3	4	5	Pos	Pts
2001	Aprilia	**MIS1**; 1	**MON**; 1	VAL; 3	**MIS2**; Ret	**MIS3**; Ret	3rd	66

=== Grand Prix motorcycle racing ===
==== Races by year ====
(key) (Races in bold indicate pole position)

Year	Class	Bike	1	2	3	4	5	6	7	8	9	10	11	12	13	14	15	16	Pos.	Pts
1995	125cc	Aprilia	AUS; Ret	MAL; 5	JPN; Ret	SPA; 20	GER; DNS	ITA; 13	NED; DNS	FRA	GBR; Ret	CZE; 19	BRA; Ret	ARG; Ret	EUR; 14				24th	10
1996	125cc	Aprilia	MAL; 13	INA; 10	JPN; 17	SPA; 19	ITA; 11	FRA; Ret	NED; Ret	GER; Ret	GBR; 19	AUT; Ret	CZE; Ret	IMO; 20	CAT	BRA	AUS		21st	14
1998	125cc	Honda	JPN; 18	MAL; DSQ	SPA; Ret	ITA	FRA	MAD	NED	GBR	GER	CZE	IMO						NC	0
1998	125cc	Yamaha												CAT; 21	AUS; 19	ARG			NC	0
2001	125cc	Aprilia	JPN	RSA	SPA	FRA	ITA; 11	CAT	NED	GBR	GER	CZE	POR	VAL	PAC	AUS	MAL	BRA; Ret	28th	5
2002	125cc	Honda	JPN; Ret	RSA; 14	SPA; 15	FRA; 16	ITA; 10	CAT; 12	NED; 18	GBR; 12	GER; Ret	CZE; Ret	POR; Ret						18th	26
2002	125cc	Aprilia												BRA; 16	PAC; 22	MAL; Ret	AUS; 11	VAL; 12	18th	26
2003	125cc	Gilera	JPN	RSA	SPA	FRA	ITA; 19	CAT; 18	NED	GBR	GER								22nd	25
2003	125cc	Honda										CZE; Ret	POR; Ret	BRA; Ret	PAC; 20	MAL; 19	AUS; 1	VAL; Ret	22nd	25
2004	125cc	Aprilia	RSA; Ret	SPA; 6	FRA; Ret	ITA; 12	CAT; 20	NED; 20	BRA; 11	GER	GBR	CZE; 12	POR; Ret	JPN; Ret	QAT; 14	MAL; 14	AUS; 14	VAL; Ret	20th	29
2005	250cc	Aprilia	SPA; 14	POR; 18	CHN; Ret	FRA; 15	ITA; 11	CAT; Ret	NED; 17	GBR; 10	GER; Ret	CZE; 16	JPN; Ret	MAL; Ret	QAT; 15	AUS; 15	TUR; 13	VAL; Ret	19th	19
2006	250cc	Aprilia	SPA	QAT; 12	TUR; Ret	CHN; 16	FRA; 12	ITA; 10	CAT; 12	NED; Ret	GBR; 15	GER; Ret	CZE; 13	MAL; Ret	AUS; 16	JPN; Ret	POR; 15	VAL; 15	17th	24
