= Jaroslav Huleš =

Czech motorcycle racer

- Nationality: Czech
Motorcycle racing career statistics
Grand Prix motorcycle racing
Active years	1993 – 2003
First race	1993 125cc Czech Republic Grand Prix
Last race	2003 250cc Valencian Community Grand Prix
Team(s)	Yamaha, Aprilia, Honda, Italjet
Championships	0
Starts / Wins / Podiums / Poles / F. laps / Points; 102 / 0 / 0 / 0 / 2 / 163

Jaroslav Huleš (2 July 1974 – 7 July 2004) was a Grand Prix motorcycle road racer from the Czech Republic. He died a few days after his 30th birthday, following a suicide attempt on that day, leaving a four-year-old son. After racing at European Championship level, he raced in the 125cc World Championship in 2000, peaking with eighth place at Donington Park. Results improved in 2001, with 11 points finishes with the best result of sixth at the Circuit de Barcelona-Catalunya. He also raced in 2002, but scored no points before a few late-season 250cc outings on a Yamaha.

== Career statistics ==
=== Races by year ===
(key) (Races in italics indicate fastest lap)

Year	Class	Bike	1	2	3	4	5	6	7	8	9	10	11	12	13	14	15	16	Pos	Pts
1993	125 cc	Honda	AUS	MAL	JPN	SPA	AUT	GER	NED	EUR	SMR	GBR	CZE; 23	ITA	USA	FIM			-	-
1994	125 cc	Honda	AUS	MAL	JPN	SPA	AUT	GER	NED	ITA	FRA	GBR	CZE; Ret	USA	ARG	EUR			-	-
1995	125 cc	Honda	AUS	MAL	JPN	SPA	GER	ITA	NED	FRA	GBR	CZE; 20	BRA	ARG	EUR				-	-
1996	125 cc	Honda	MAL; 14	INA; 17	JPN; 14	SPA; 22	ITA; 15	FRA; Ret	NED; Ret	GER; 17	GBR; 18	AUT; 17	CZE; 17	IMO; 13	CAT; 13	BRA; 15	AUS; Ret		23rd	12
1997	125 cc	Honda	MAL; 11	JPN; Ret	SPA; 14	ITA	AUT; Ret	FRA; Ret	NED; 11	IMO; 13	GER; Ret	BRA; Ret	GBR; Ret	CZE; 14	CAT; Ret	INA; 20	AUS; Ret		21st	17
1998	125 cc	Honda	JPN; Ret	MAL; 14	SPA; 6	ITA; Ret	FRA; Ret	MAD; 12	NED; 15	GBR; Ret	GER; Ret	CZE; Ret	IMO; Ret	CAT; 19	AUS; 8	ARG; 18			20th	25
1999	125 cc	Italjet	MAL	JPN	SPA	FRA	ITA	CAT	NED	GBR	GER	CZE; Ret	IMO; Ret	VAL	AUS	RSA	BRA	ARG	-	-
2000	125 cc	Italjet	RSA; Ret	MAL; Ret	JPN; Ret	SPA; 14	FRA; Ret	ITA; 14	CAT; Ret	NED; Ret	GBR; 8	GER; Ret	CZE; 9	POR; 10	VAL; 21	BRA; Ret	PAC	AUS; 15	19th	26
2001	125 cc	Honda	JPN; 17	RSA; 22	SPA; 9	FRA; 9	ITA; 15	CAT; Ret	NED; 8	GBR; Ret	GER; 6	CZE; 7	POR; 7	VAL; Ret	PAC; 14	AUS; 14	MAL; 15	BRA; 10	15th	62
2002	125 cc	Aprilia	JPN; Ret	RSA; Ret	SPA; Ret	FRA; Ret	ITA; Ret	CAT; 21	NED; 17	GBR	GER								-	-
2002	250 cc	Yamaha										CZE; Ret	POR; Ret	BRA; 11	PAC; 15	MAL; 15	AUS; 12	VAL; 16	24th	11
2003	250 cc	Yamaha	JPN; 17	RSA; 16	SPA; 16	FRA; 16	ITA	CAT	NED	GBR	GER	CZE	POR						25th	10
2003	250 cc	Honda												BRA; 15	PAC; Ret	MAL; 15	AUS; 8	VAL; Ret	25th	10
