= Dirk Heidolf =

German former motorcycle racer

- Nationality: German
Motorcycle racing career statistics
Grand Prix motorcycle racing
Active years	1997 - 2007
First race	1997 125cc German Grand Prix
Last race	2007 250cc Valencia Grand Prix
Starts / Wins / Podiums / Poles / F. laps / Points; 92 / 0 / 0 / 0 / 0 / 108

Dirk Heidolf (born 14 September 1976, Hohenstein) is a German former road racer of solo motorcycles at Grand Prix level.

Heidolf's best seasons were in 2002 and 2007 when he finished the year in 20th place in the 250 cc world championship. He ran his own team in the Moto3 World Championship called Racing Team Germany.

== Races by year ==
(key) (Races in bold indicate pole position, races in italics indicate fastest lap)

Year	Class	Bike	1	2	3	4	5	6	7	8	9	10	11	12	13	14	15	16	17	Pos.	Pts
1997	125cc	Honda	MAL	JPN	SPA	ITA	AUT	FRA	NED	IMO	GER; Ret	BRA	GBR	CZE	CAT	INA	AUS			NC	0
1998	125cc	Honda	JPN	MAL	SPA	ITA	FRA	MAD	NED	GBR	GER; 20	CZE	IMO	CAT	AUS	ARG				NC	0
1999	250cc	Honda	MAL	JPN	SPA	FRA	ITA	CAT	NED	GBR	GER; 21	CZE	IMO	VAL	AUS	RSA	BRA	ARG		NC	0
2000	250cc	Yamaha	RSA	MAL	JPN	SPA	FRA	ITA	CAT	NED	GBR	GER; 20	CZE	POR	VAL	BRA	PAC	AUS		NC	0
2001	250cc	Yamaha	JPN	RSA	SPA	FRA	ITA	CAT	NED	GBR	GER; 16	CZE	POR	VAL	PAC	AUS	MAL	BRA		NC	0
2002	250cc	Aprilia	JPN	RSA; 14	SPA; Ret	FRA; 18	ITA; Ret	CAT; 21	NED; 20	GBR; 18	GER; 12	CZE; 14	POR; 9	BRA; 14	PAC; 20	MAL; 18	AUS; 16	VAL; 19		20th	17
2003	250cc	Aprilia	JPN; Ret	RSA; Ret	SPA; 15	FRA; Ret	ITA	CAT	NED	GBR; 15	GER; 11	CZE; 13	POR; 17	BRA; 14	PAC; 14	MAL; 11	AUS; 13	VAL; 12		21st	26
2004	250cc	Aprilia	RSA; 14	SPA; 16	FRA; 16	ITA; Ret	CAT; Ret	NED	BRA; 15	GER; 18	GBR; 17	CZE; 11	POR; 15	JPN; 21	QAT; Ret	MAL; 12	AUS; Ret	VAL; 18		23rd	13
2005	250cc	Honda	SPA; Ret	POR; 16	CHN; 15	FRA; Ret	ITA; Ret	CAT	NED; 19	GBR; Ret	GER; 13	CZE; Ret	JPN; 18	MAL; 11	QAT; 18	AUS; 12	TUR; 16	VAL; Ret		22nd	13
2006	250cc	Aprilia	SPA; 15	QAT; 15	TUR; 14	CHN; 15	FRA; 18	ITA	CAT	NED	GBR	GER; 16	CZE; 11	MAL; Ret	AUS; 11	JPN; 16	POR; 16	VAL; Ret		21st	15
2007	250cc	Aprilia	QAT; 15	SPA; 10	TUR; 13	CHN; Ret	FRA; 16	ITA; 17	CAT; Ret	GBR; 12	NED; 16	GER; 13	CZE; 17	RSM; Ret	POR; 11	JPN; Ret	AUS; 15	MAL; 15	VAL; 16	20th	24
