= Stefano Perugini =

Italian motorcycle racer (born 1974)

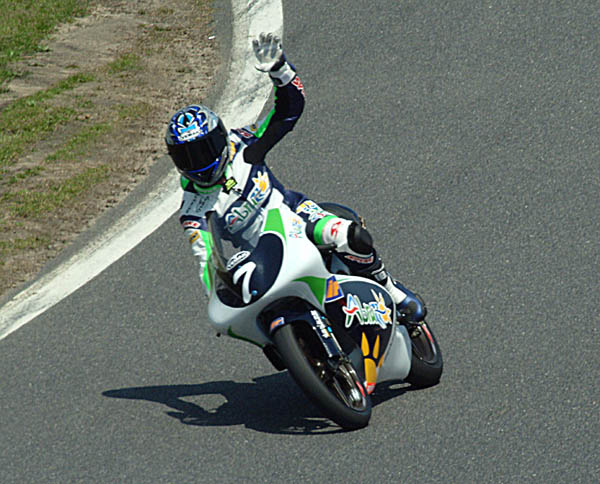
- Perugini at the 2003 Japanese Grand Prix.
- Nationality: Italian
- Born: 10 September 1974 (age 52); Viterbo
Motorcycle racing career statistics
Grand Prix motorcycle racing
| Active years | 1993 - 2004 |
| First race | 1993 125cc Italian Grand Prix |
| Last race | 2004 125cc Valencia Grand Prix |
| First win | 1996 125cc Malaysian Grand Prix |
| Last win | 2003 125cc German Grand Prix |
| Team(s) | Aprilia, Italjet, Gilera |
Starts / Wins / Podiums / Poles / F. laps / Points; 151 / 5 / 19 / 5 / 8 / 919

Stefano Perugini (born 10 September 1974, in Viterbo) is a former Grand Prix motorcycle road racer from Italy. His best season was in 2003 when he won two Grand Prix races and finished the season in fourth place in the 125cc world championship. He won five Grand Prix races during his career.

== Career statistics ==
=== Grand Prix motorcycle racing ===
==== Races by year ====
(key) (Races in bold indicate pole position; races in italics indicate fastest lap)

| Year | Class | Bike | 1 | 2 | 3 | 4 | 5 | 6 | 7 | 8 | 9 | 10 | 11 | 12 | 13 | 14 | 15 | 16 | Pos | Pts |
|---|---|---|---|---|---|---|---|---|---|---|---|---|---|---|---|---|---|---|---|---|
| 1993 | 125cc | Aprilia | AUS | MAL | JPN | ESP | AUT | GER | NED | EUR | RSM | GBR | CZE | ITA; 25 | USA | FIM | | | NC | 0 |
| 1994 | 125cc | Aprilia | AUS; Ret | MAL; Ret | JPN; 19 | ESP; 12 | AUT; 6 | GER; 5 | NED; Ret | ITA; Ret | FRA; 7 | GBR; 2 | CZE; 3 | USA; 2 | ARG; 3 | EUR; Ret | | | 7th | 106 |
| 1995 | 125cc | Aprilia | AUS; 6 | MAL; 2 | JPN; Ret | ESP; 2 | GER; 4 | ITA; 2 | NED; 7 | FRA; 6 | **GBR**; 2 | CZE; Ret | **BRA**; Ret | ARG; Ret | EUR; 10 | | | | 6th | 118 |
| 1996 | 125cc | Aprilia | MAL; 1 | INA; 8 | JPN; 12 | ESP; 7 | ITA; Ret | FRA; 1 | NED; 13 | GER; 2 | GBR; 1 | AUT; Ret | CZE; 14 | IMO; DNS | CAT; Ret | BRA; 9 | AUS; Ret | | 6th | 128 |
| 1997 | 250cc | Aprilia | MAL; Ret | JPN; Ret | ESP; 6 | ITA; 7 | AUT; 6 | FRA; Ret | NED; 5 | IMO; Ret | GER; Ret | BRA; 6 | GBR; 7 | CZE; 7 | CAT; Ret | INA; 8 | AUS; 7 | | 9th | 85 |
| 1998 | 250cc | Honda | JPN; 12 | MAL; 6 | ESP; 7 | ITA; 5 | FRA; 5 | MAD; Ret | NED; Ret | GBR; 3 | GER; Ret | CZE; 11 | IMO; 3 | CAT; 6 | AUS; 6 | ARG; Ret | | | 7th | 102 |
| 1999 | 250cc | Honda | MAL; 9 | JPN; Ret | ESP; 8 | FRA; 3 | ITA; 8 | CAT; 7 | NED; 8 | GBR; 5 | GER; 5 | CZE; 6 | IMO; 4 | VAL; 5 | AUS; 7 | RSA; 7 | BRA; 5 | ARG; 6 | 5th | 151 |
| 2001 | 125cc | Italjet | JPN; Ret | RSA; 11 | SPA; 12 | FRA; Ret | ITA; Ret | CAT; 11 | NED; 12 | GBR; Ret | GER; 16 | CZE; Ret | POR; Ret | VAL; 12 | PAC; Ret | AUS; 16 | MAL; 13 | BRA; Ret | 21st | 25 |
| 2002 | 125cc | Italjet | JPN; 11 | RSA; 24 | SPA; 16 | FRA; Ret | ITA; 15 | CAT; 13 | NED; Ret | GBR; 11 | GER; Ret | CZE; 18 | POR; Ret | BRA; 6 | PAC; 20 | MAL; Ret | AUS; 12 | VAL; Ret | 17th | 28 |
| 2003 | 125cc | Aprilia | JPN; 1 | RSA; Ret | SPA; 5 | FRA; 7 | ITA; 7 | CAT; 5 | NED; 5 | **GBR**; 3 | **GER**; 1 | CZE; 2 | POR; Ret | BRA; 7 | PAC; 4 | MAL; Ret | **AUS**; Ret | VAL; 13 | 4th | 162 |
| 2004 | 125cc | Gilera | RSA; 17 | SPA; 23 | FRA; Ret | ITA; Ret | CAT; 22 | NED; 14 | BRA; 22 | GER; 15 | GBR; 11 | CZE; 17 | POR; 10 | JPN; Ret | QAT; 16 | MAL; Ret | AUS; Ret | VAL; Ret | 24th | 14 |

Sporting positions
| Preceded by (Spain) Juan Borja | 125 cc motorcycle European Champion; 1993 | Succeeded by (Italy) Ivan Cremonini |
