= Fonsi Nieto =

Spanish motorcycle racer

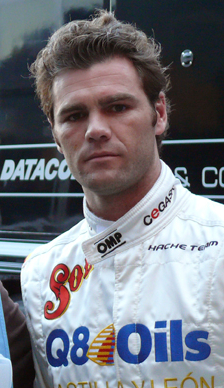
- Nieto in 2009
- Nationality: Spanish
- Born: Alfonso González Nieto; 2 December 1978 (age 47); Madrid, Spain
- Website: fonsinieto.com
Motorcycle racing career statistics
MotoGP World Championship
Active years	2007
Manufacturers	Kawasaki
Championships	0
2007 championship position	22nd (5 pts)
Starts / Wins / Podiums / Poles / F. laps / Points; 1 / 0 / 0 / 0 / 0 / 5
Moto2 World Championship
Active years	2010
Manufacturers	Moriwaki-Honda
Championships	0
2010 championship position	18th (45 pts)
Starts / Wins / Podiums / Poles / F. laps / Points; 15 / 0 / 0 / 0 / 0 / 45
250cc World Championship
Active years	1999–2004
Manufacturers	Aprilia, Yamaha
Championships	0
2004 championship position	7th (124 pts)
Starts / Wins / Podiums / Poles / F. laps / Points; 95 / 5 / 18 / 12 / 7 / 771
125cc World Championship
Active years	1997–1998
Manufacturers	Aprilia
Championships	0
1998 championship position	29th (3 pts)
Starts / Wins / Podiums / Poles / F. laps / Points; 4 / 0 / 0 / 0 / 0 / 3

Alfonso González Nieto (born 2 December 1978 in Madrid, Spain), better known as Fonsi Nieto, is a Spanish former Grand Prix motorcycle road racer and the nephew of successful Grand Prix motorcycle road racer Ángel Nieto. After success in the 250cc class, he moved to World Superbike and made one MotoGP start. For 2010, he returned to the Grand Prix scene in the newly formed Moto2 category.

Nieto announced his retirement from competition in early 2011 after failing to recover from injuries suffered when racing at Indianapolis in 2010.

After the dramatic injury, Nieto began his career as a DJ and music producer, playing regularly at venues in Spain.

Nieto is currently the Rider Performance Director for Pramac Racing.

== Early years ==
Nieto won the Spanish 125cc championship in 1998, and the Spanish 250cc champion in 1999 and 2000, also winning the less prestigious European 125cc title in 1997. In 1999 and 2000, he raced in the 250cc World Championship alongside his domestic commitments, finishing 14th overall on a Yamaha TZ250 with a best result of sixth at Estoril in 2000.

== 250cc World Championship ==
Nieto was fourth in the world championship in 2001, with four successive fifth places early in the season and a pair of late-season podium finishes. He won four races in 2002, finishing second to Marco Melandri. He was then fifth in 2003 with a win at Donington Park, and seventh in 2004.

== Superbike World Championship ==
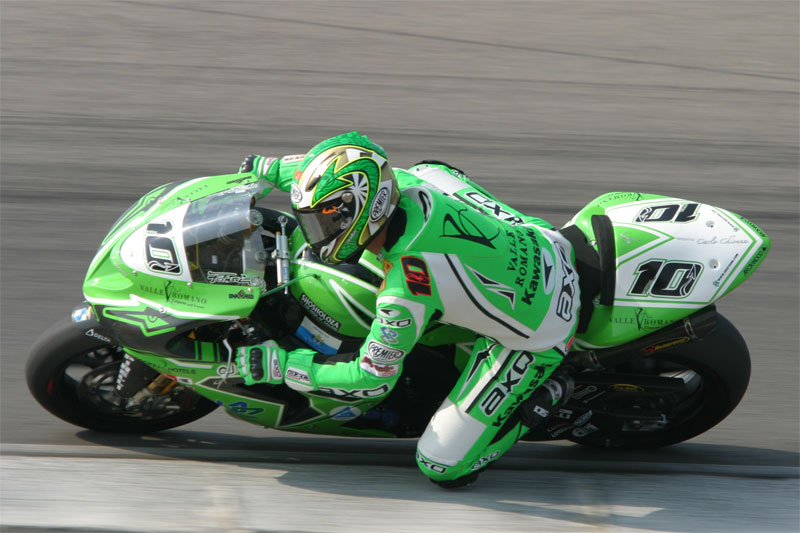
Nieto at the Assen round of the 2007 season.

In 2005, Nieto entered the Superbike World Championship with the Caracchi Ducati team, finishing 17th overall in the championship. A fourth in Round 4 of the season was the highlight; he only reached the top-ten once more. For 2006 and 2007 he rode for PSG-Kawasaki. His first podium finish came in Race 2 at Assen in 2006, following teammate Chris Walker's victory in the first race. He was also third at Magny-Cours in 2007. He took pole position at Lausitzring in 2007 after finding a dry spell in a wet qualifying session.

In 2007, Nieto also replaced the injured Olivier Jacque in the French Grand Prix making his debut in the MotoGP class, finishing the race in 11th place.

For 2008, Nieto joined Alstare Suzuki, making an immediate impact by winning his first world superbike race in the second race of the opening round in Qatar. He finished the season seventh overall, but lost his 2009 ride as the team scaled back to two riders and retained the less successful Japanese Yukio Kagayama. However, Nieto returned to the team mid-season after Max Neukirchner was injured.

== Career statistics ==
=== Races by year ===
(key) (Races in bold indicate pole position, races in italics indicate fastest lap)

Year	Class	Bike	1	2	3	4	5	6	7	8	9	10	11	12	13	14	15	16	17	18	Pos	Pts
1997	125cc	Aprilia	MAL	JPN	SPA; 16	ITA	AUT	FRA	NED	IMO	GER	BRA	GBR	CZE	CAT	INA	AUS				NC	0
1998	125cc	Aprilia	JPN	MAL	SPA; 15	ITA	FRA	MAD; 14	NED	GBR	GER	CZE	IMO	CAT; 17	AUS	ARG					29th	3
1999	250cc	Yamaha	MAL; 22	JPN; 14	SPA; 18	FRA; 12	ITA; 17	CAT; Ret	NED; 19	GBR; 17	GER; 18	CZE; 17	IMO; 18	VAL; 15	AUS; 16	RSA; 15	BRA; 17	ARG; 14			23rd	10
2000	250cc	Yamaha	RSA; Ret	MAL; Ret	JPN; 22	SPA; 16	FRA; 16	ITA; 9	CAT; 18	NED; 16	GBR; 18	GER; 12	CZE; Ret	POR; 6	VAL; 17	BRA; 11	PAC; 14	AUS; 9			14th	35
2001	250cc	Aprilia	JPN; 11	RSA; 5	SPA; 5	FRA; 5	ITA; 5	CAT; 5	NED; DNS	GBR; 6	GER; 10	CZE; 7	POR; 4	**VAL**; 3	PAC; 4	AUS; 5	MAL; 3	**BRA**; 4			5th	167
2002	250cc	Aprilia	**JPN**; 13	RSA; 3	SPA; 1	**FRA**; 1	ITA; 3	**CAT**; 3	NED; 5	**GBR**; 2	**GER**; 4	**CZE**; 4	POR; 1	BRA; Ret	**PAC**; 4	**MAL**; 1	**AUS**; 2	VAL; Ret			**2nd**	**241**
2003	250cc	Aprilia	JPN; 6	RSA; 7	SPA; 7	FRA; 4	ITA; 2	CAT; 2	NED; Ret	**GBR**; 1	GER; 2	CZE; 6	POR; 9	BRA; Ret	PAC; 8	MAL; 3	AUS; 3	VAL; 5			5th	194
2004	250cc	Aprilia	RSA; 7	SPA; 3	FRA; 7	ITA; 5	CAT; 5	NED; 8	BRA; 5	GER; 8	GBR; 5	CZE; Ret	POR; Ret	JPN; Ret	QAT; 5	MAL; 7	AUS; Ret	VAL; 6			7th	124
2007	MotoGP	Kawasaki	QAT	SPA	TUR	CHN	FRA; 11	ITA	CAT	GBR	NED	GER	USA	CZE	RSM	POR	JPN	AUS	MAL	VAL	22nd	5
2010	Moto2	Moriwaki	QAT; 13	SPA; 21	FRA; 8	ITA; 15	GBR; 11	NED; Ret	CAT; 8	GER; 4	CZE; 13	INP; DNS	SMR	ARA; Ret	JPN; Ret	MAL; 19	AUS; 12	POR; 24	VAL; Ret		18th	45

Sporting positions
Preceded by Alvaro Molina	Spanish 125cc Champion; 1998	Succeeded by Jerónimo Vidal
Preceded by José Luis Cardoso	Spanish 250cc Champion; 1999-2000	Succeeded by Alex Debón
Preceded by Colin Edwards; Jeff Gordon; Jimmie Johnson	Race of Champions; Nations' Cup; 2003 with: Cristiano da Matta; Gilles Panizzi	Succeeded by Jean Alesi; Sébastien Loeb
