= Steve Jenkner =

German motorcycle racer

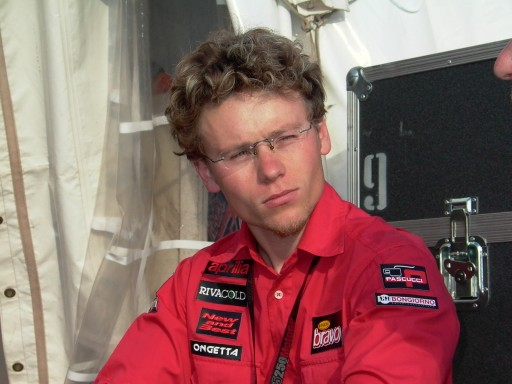
- Nationality: German
- Born: 31 May 1976 (age 50); Lichtenstein, Bezirk Karl-Marx-Stadt, East Germany
Motorcycle racing career statistics
Grand Prix motorcycle racing
Active years	1996 - 2005
First race	1996 125cc German Grand Prix
Last race	2005 250cc Valencia Grand Prix
First win	2003 125cc Dutch TT
Last win	2003 125cc Dutch TT
Team	Aprilia
Starts / Wins / Podiums / Poles / F. laps / Points; 137 / 1 / 14 / 1 / 6 / 741

Steve Jenkner (born 31 May 1976 in Lichtenstein) is a German former professional Grand Prix motorcycle road racer. He had his best year in 2002 when he finished the year in fifth place in the 125cc world championship.

== Career ==
=== 125cc World Championship (1996-2003) ===
==== Aprilia (1996-1999) ====
Jenkner made his Grand Prix motorcycle racing debut as a wild card in his home Grand Prix in Germany, failing to finish the race and be classified.

Jenkner's first full season came in 1997, riding an Aprilia. Jenkner scored points in six races, most notably a seventh place in Brno, finishing with a total of 20 points in the season, and 19th in the standings.

In 1998, Jenkner would again be riding an Aprilia, and improved a bit from prior season. He finished in the points nine times, four times inside the top-ten, with a seventh place at Le Castellet, an eighth place at Sachsenring, a ninth place at Assen, and a tenth place in Madrid. He finished 17th in the rider's championship, with 45 points.

In his final season with Aprilia, Jenkner finished the 1999 season with nine point-scoring finishes, a tenth place in Australia, an eighth place in France, two seventh places in Brno and Imola, and a career best finish of fifth in Valencia, ending his season 15th in the rider's championship, with 52 points.

==== ADAC Sachsen Honda (2000) ====
Making small steps forward, Jenkner would improve again in the 2000 season, having eleven point-scoring finishes, seven top-tens, including a sixth place in South Africa, and a fourth place in Mugello. He finished the year 12th in the overall standings, with 74 points.

==== Team UGT 3000 Aprilia (2001-2002) ====
Returning to Aprilia for the 2001 season, Jenkner would finally taste the champagne on the podium, finishing third in Assen, and Brno as well, ending a successful campaign in 11th overall, with 94 points.

Staying with the UGT 3000 Abruzzo Aprilia team for the 2002 season, Jenkner would have the best year of his career yet, finishing on the podium five times, all five being third places, at Jerez, Barcelona, the Sachsenring, Estoril, and Motegi. He finished the season fifth in the rider's championship, with 168 points.

==== Exalt Cycle Red Devil (2003) ====
Jenkner started the 2003 season like a dream, a third place in Suzuka, a third place in Phakisa, and a second place in Jerez, meant three consecutive podiums, and a chance at the title. He retired in Mugello, and finished in fourth in Barcelona, before finally achieving his maiden 125cc victory in the 2003 Dutch TT, in Assen. However, following his victory, Jenkner retired from four consecutive races, ending his title hopes. He finished off the season well, with a third place in Australia, and a second place in Valencia, but the six retirements were too many, and he finished the year sixth in the rider's championship, with 151 points.

==== Rauch Bravo Aprilia (2004) ====
Partnering Marco Simoncelli in 2004, this would be Jenkner's final season in the 125cc category. In the second race of the season in Jerez, he would finish second, and in the fourth race of the season in Mugello, he would achieve his first pole position, but finished the race in seventh only. He was a solid points finisher, but did not have another podium, finishing the year eighth in the standings, with 122 points.

=== 250cc World Championship ===
Graduating to the intermediate category for the final season of Jenkner's career, he would race with Nocable.it Race Aprilia team, and struggle with the bigger bikes. He failed to score a single point in the first eight races of the season, eventually finding a rhythm late on in the season, with six straight points finishes in Germany, Czechia, Japan, Malaysia, Qatar, and Australia. His 12th place in Japan was his best of the year, ultimately finishing his professional racing career 23rd in the standings, with 13 points.
