= Huang Shizhao =

Chinese motorcycle racer

Huang Shi Zhao
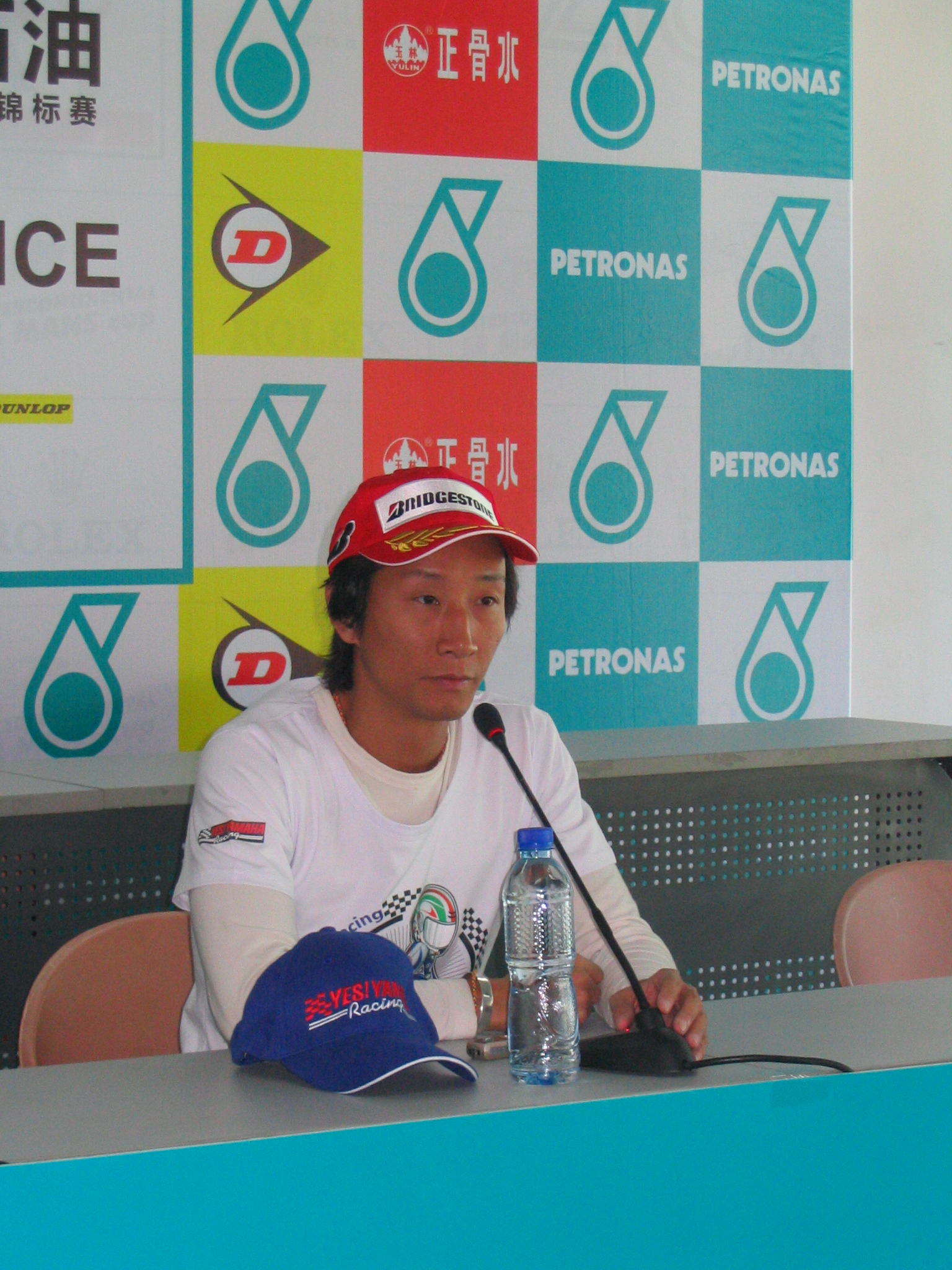
- Huang Shi Zhao at the China Superbike Championship post race press conference in October 2010.
- Nationality: Chinese
- Born: 30 November 1973 (age 52); Guangzhou, China
Motorcycle racing career statistics
250cc World Championship
Active years	2003, 2005-2007
Manufacturers	Yamaha
2007 championship position	NC (0 pts)
Starts / Wins / Podiums / Poles / F. laps / Points; 3 / 0 / 0 / 0 / 0 / 0

Huang Shi Zhao (simplified Chinese: 黄世钊; traditional Chinese: 黃世釗; pinyin: Huáng Shìzhāo; born 30 November 1973 in Guangzhou, China), is a Chinese motorcycle racer. He is the 2010 China Superbike Championship 600cc overall champion for Yes! Tianjian Yamaha Racing.

== Career ==
Before his Grand Prix debut, Huang competed in the FIM Endurance World Championship with the Zongshen team in 1996 and 1997, and won the China Superbike Championship 600 Pro SuperSports class from 2002 to 2004. His 19th-place finish at the 2003 Malaysian motorcycle Grand Prix made him the first Chinese rider to qualify for and finish a Grand Prix race.

In 2003, Huang raced for Arlen Ness in the 250cc World Championship race in Sepang, Malaysia. He finished 19th.

Huang raced in the 250cc World Championship in Shanghai, China in 2006 and finished 20th in the race for Yamaha Tianjina Racing.

Huang also raced in the 2007 250cc World Championship, but retired in Japan and failed to start in China due to an injury in practice.

In 2010, Huang raced for Yes! Yamaha Tianjian Racing in the 600cc class of the China Superbike Championship. He won seven races out of eight and became the class champion.

== By season ==
Season	Class	Motorcycle	Team	Number	Race	Win	Podium	Pole	FLap	Pts	Plcd
2003	250cc	Yamaha	Madifchina d'Antin Yamaha	81	1	0	0	0	0	0	NC
2005	250cc	Yamaha	Team Yamaha China Tianjian	58	1	0	0	0	0	0	NC
2006	250cc	Yamaha	Yamaha Tianjian Racing Team	62	1	0	0	0	0	0	NC
2007	250cc	Yamaha	Yes! Yamaha Tianjin	62	0	0	0	0	0	0	NC
Total					3	0	0	0	0	0	

=== Races by year ===
(key)

Year	Class	Bike	1	2	3	4	5	6	7	8	9	10	11	12	13	14	15	16	17	Pos.	Pts
2003	250cc	Yamaha	JPN	RSA	SPA	FRA	ITA	CAT	NED	GBR	GER	CZE	POR	BRA	PAC	MAL; 19	AUS	VAL		NC	0
2005	250cc	Yamaha	SPA	POR	CHN; 21	FRA	ITA	CAT	NED	GBR	GER	CZE	JPN	MAL	QAT	AUS	TUR	VAL		NC	0
2006	250cc	Yamaha	SPA	QAT	TUR	CHN; 20	FRA	ITA	CAT	NED	GBR	GER	CZE	MAL	AUS	JPN	POR	VAL		NC	0
2007	250cc	Yamaha	QAT	SPA	TUR	CHN; DNS	FRA	ITA	CAT	GBR	NED	GER	CZE	RSM	POR	JPN	AUS	MAL	VAL	NC	0
