= 2003 Grand Prix motorcycle racing season =

Sports season

2003 F.I.M. Grand Prix motorcycle racing season

Seasons
- ← 2002 2004 →

2003 World Champions

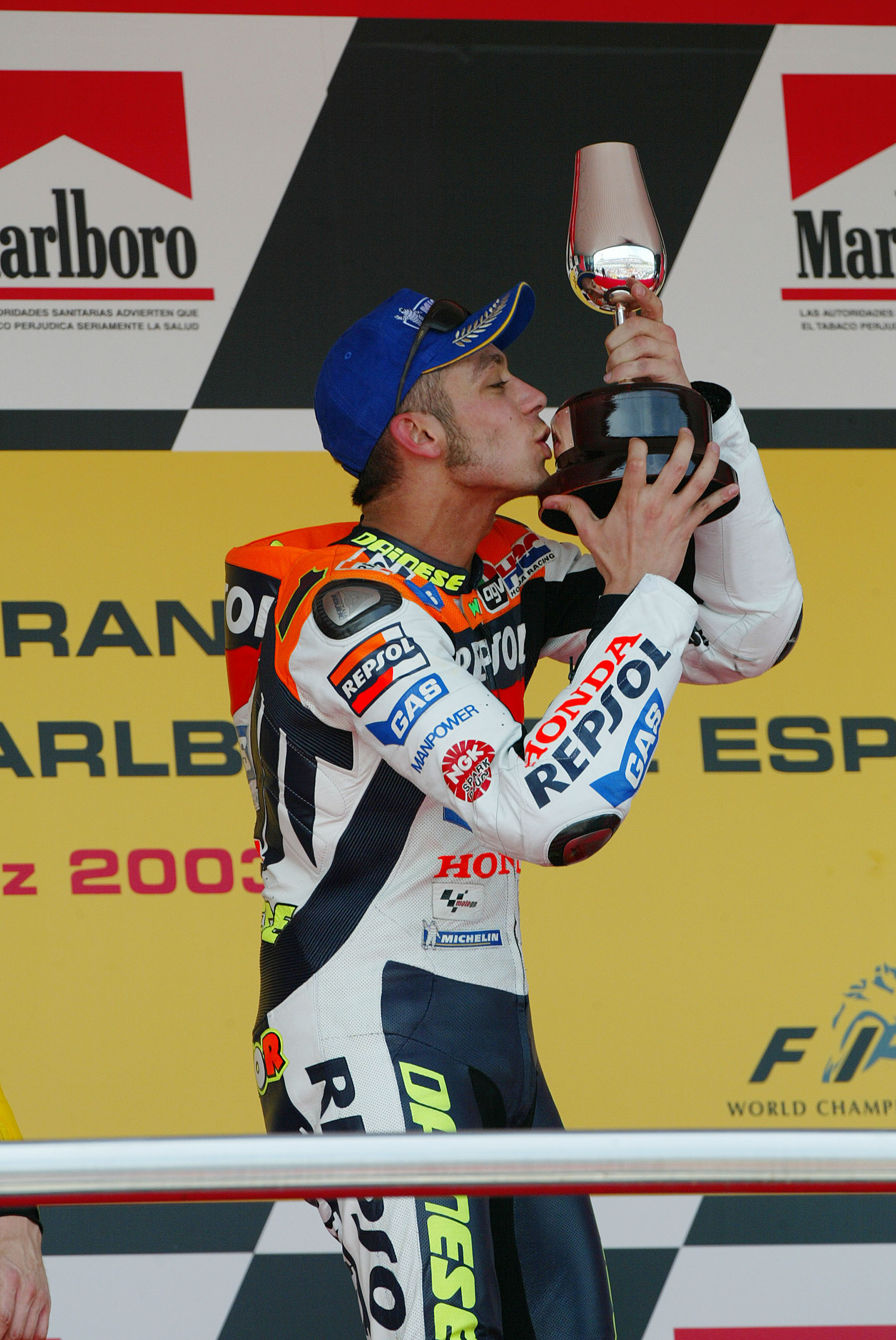
Valentino Rossi became the MotoGP World Champion

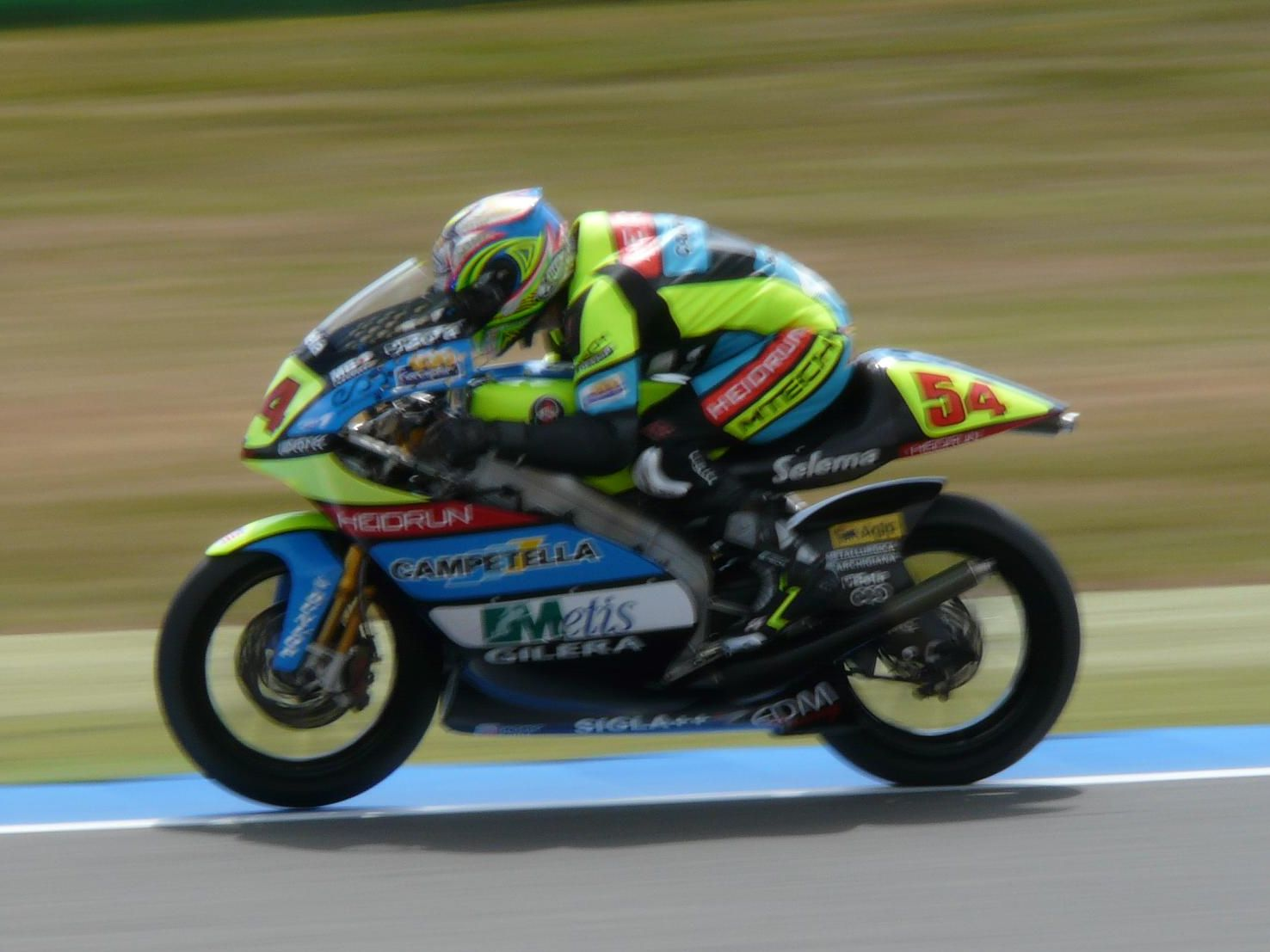
Manuel Poggiali (pictured in 2008) became the 250cc World Champion

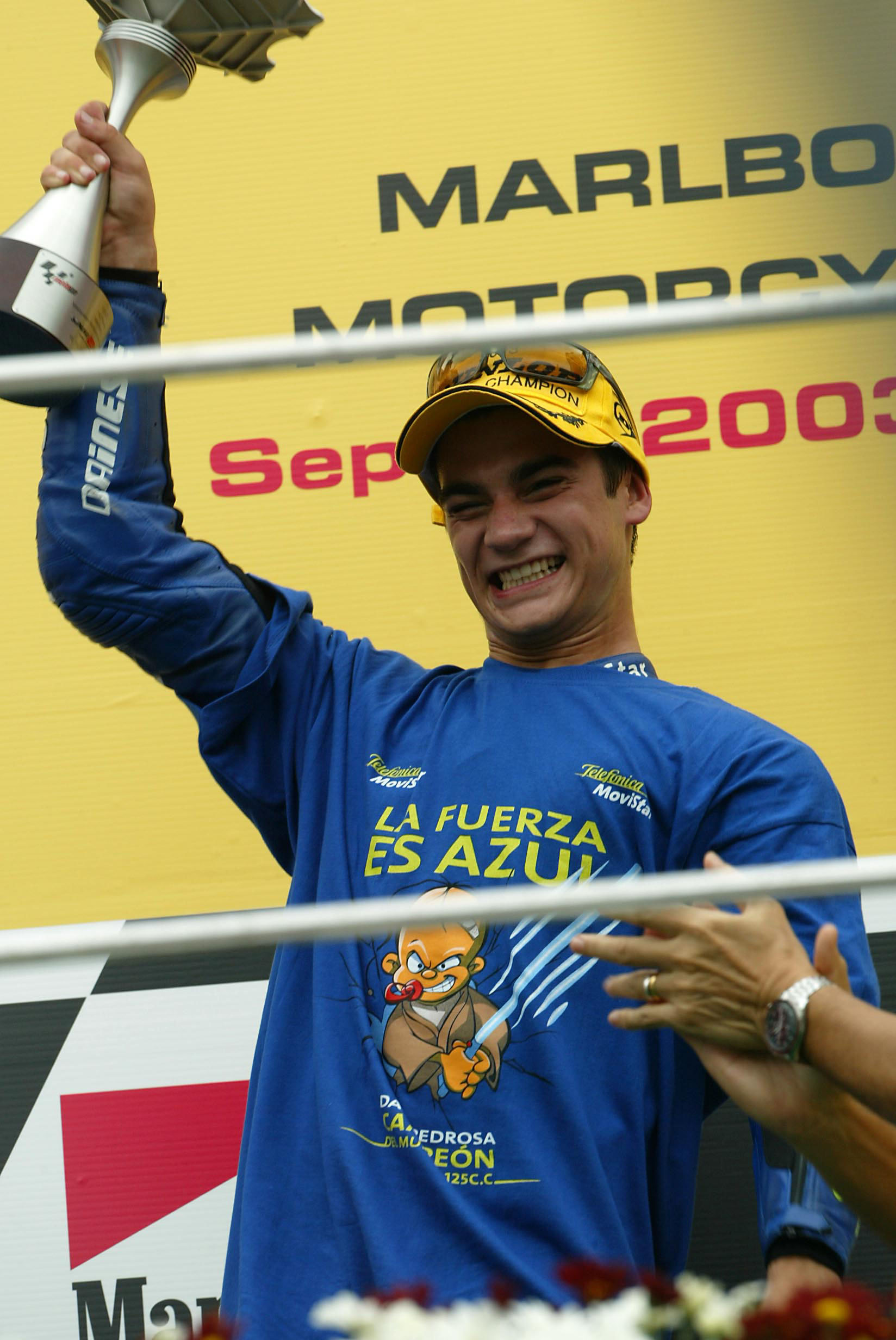
Daniel Pedrosa became the 125cc World Champion

The 2003 Grand Prix motorcycle racing season was the 55th F.I.M. Road racing World Championship season. The season consisted of 16 races, beginning with the Japanese motorcycle Grand Prix on 6 April 2003 and ending with the Valencian Community motorcycle Grand Prix on 2 November.

== Season summary ==
Defending champion Valentino Rossi won his 3rd MotoGP championship in 2003, winning 9 races, highlighted by his win at Phillip Island where he was given a 10-second penalty for passing under a yellow flag and he overcame the penalty by winning the race with more than 10 seconds in hand. Rossi had become dissatisfied with his relationship with the Honda Racing Corporation and as the season progressed and HRC tried to get Rossi to sign a new contract, Rossi demurred until finally announcing at the end of the year that he would be leaving Honda. He soon signed with Yamaha and took Jeremy Burgess with him to be his crew chief.

The season was marred by Daijiro Kato being killed at the first round at Suzuka. He lost control of his motorcycle on the approach to the Casio Triangle and hit a barrier at high speed. His heart was restarted by track paramedics, but he did not wake from a coma and died 2 weeks later. Controversy arose because the race was not red-flagged to allow Kato to be removed from the track with maximum care. Kato's death was the first rider to die in top-tier MotoGP class since Kevin Wrettom in 1984 500cc season. Kato's death would be the last motorsport fatality at the Suzuka Circuit until Jules Bianchi died as a result of his injuries following an accident at the 2014 Japanese Grand Prix in Formula One. Suzuka has since been removed from the MotoGP calendar. Teammate Sete Gibernau would inherit Kato's factory-spec RC211V.

MotoGP rookies for 2003 included Nicky Hayden (Rookie of the Year), Troy Bayliss, Marco Melandri and Colin Edwards. A new constructor also arrived: Ducati. After much success in Superbike racing, Ducati returned to the premier-class of GP with their GP3. It made an immediate impression with its raw speed, and they finished the constructor's championship in second place, ahead of Yamaha and behind Honda.

Just like in 1998, Honda motorcycles won 15 (9 for Repsol Honda, 4 for Gresini and 2 for Pons each) of 16 races in the premier MotoGP class season.

== 2003 Grand Prix season calendar ==
On 12 July 2002, the FIM confirmed the 2003 pre-calendar. The South African GP was originally scheduled to run as the new season opener before the Japanese GP on this pre-calendar. On 16 October 2002, the FIM confirmed the 2003 calendar. In it, the South African and Japanese Grands Prix were switched around again.

The following Grands Prix were scheduled to take place in 2003:

| Round | Date | Grand Prix | Circuit |
|---|---|---|---|
| 1 | 6 April | SKYY vodka Grand Prix of Japan | Suzuka Circuit |
| 2 | 27 April | (South Africa) Arnette Africa's Grand Prix | Phakisa Freeway |
| 3 | 11 May | (Spain) Gran Prémio Marlboro de España | Circuito de Jerez |
| 4 | 25 May | Grand Prix Polini de France | Bugatti Circuit |
| 5 | 8 June | (Italy) Gran Premio Cinzano d'Italia | Mugello Circuit |
| 6 | 15 June | (Catalonia) Gran Premi Marlboro de Catalunya | Circuit de Catalunya |
| 7 | 28 June †† | (Netherlands) Gauloises Dutch TT | TT Circuit Assen |
| 8 | 13 July | (United Kingdom) Cinzano British Grand Prix | Donington Park |
| 9 | 27 July | (Germany) Cinzano Motorrad Grand Prix von Deutschland | Sachsenring |
| 10 | 17 August | (Czech Republic) Gauloises Grand Prix České republiky | Brno Circuit |
| 11 | 7 September | Grande Prémio Marlboro de Portugal | Autódromo do Estoril |
| 12 | 20 September †† | (Rio de Janeiro (state)) Cinzano Rio Grand Prix | Autódromo Internacional Nelson Piquet |
| 13 | 5 October | (Tochigi Prefecture) Gauloises Pacific Grand Prix of Motegi | Twin Ring Motegi |
| 14 | 12 October | (Malaysia) Marlboro Malaysian Motorcycle Grand Prix | Sepang International Circuit |
| 15 | 19 October | (Australia) SKYY vodka Australian Grand Prix | Phillip Island Grand Prix Circuit |
| 16 | 2 November | (Valencian Community) Gran Premio Marlboro Comunitat Valenciana | Circuit Ricardo Tormo |

†† = Saturday race

=== Calendar changes ===
There were no calendar changes for the 2003 season.

== Regulation changes ==
The following changes are made to the regulation for the 2003 season:

=== Sporting regulations ===
For this year, the rules changed regarding the neutralisation of a race. This only applies to the MotoGP class. If the circumstances change in such a significant way due to weather changes, a heavy accident or any other reason, a race may be neutralised either once or multiple times and the following rules will apply:

- A white flag with diagonal red cross (indicating damp conditions) will be shown in a still manner at each marshal post.
- A safety car will enter and make one sighting lap. The subsequent pit lane exit will be closed with red lights and a red flag indicating this.
- Riders can opt to enter the pit lane at the end of their current lap or make one more sighting lap to check the track conditions, then will have to enter the pits.
- All riders who opt to ride one more lap have to catch up to the safety car on track. Any overtaking of the safety car is forbidden.
- At the end of the safety car's run, it will enter the pit lane and the circuit will be closed with indication of the red flags. All riders following the safety car must also enter the pits.
- The safety car will stop ± 50 meters behind the exit of the pit lane.
- While in the pits, all riders are allowed to make changes to their tyres, adjustments to their motorcycles, refuel or change bikes.
- If the race is neutralised before the final lap, a provisional race classification will be published. The provisional classification will consist out of the results taken at the last point where the leader, as well as all other riders on the same lap as the leader, had completed a full lap without the display of any neutralisation flags being waved. Riders who were already in the pit lane before will also be included in the provisional classification. Any rider who did not complete at least 75% of the laps completed by the race leader will not be classified. The race will be resumed if possible following the procedures of article 1.28.
- If a race is neutralised during the final lap, the following procedure will apply: if at least one rider has completed all scheduled number of laps of the original race, the final classification will be calculated according to article 1.25.1 and the race will not be resumed. If no rider has completed the final number of laps of the original race, the provision of article 1.27.8 will apply and the race will continue based on the standards of article 1.28.
- If a race is neutralised more than once, the provisional race classification for positions and allowance of participation in the resumed start will always be based on the provisional race classification from the last time a race was neutralised.
- In all cases, the provisional race classification must be displayed on the official timekeeping monitors.

In the case of a race restart after neutralisation, the following rules will apply for the MotoGP class only:

- The Race Direction will officially announce when the safety car will leave the pits to resume the race.
- The number of laps which still have to be done will be measured by the scheduled number of laps the original race had and the number of laps of the provisional race classification. If the difference is less than three, the number of laps to go will be three laps.
- If a race is neutralised more than once, the number of laps which still have to be done will be measured by the scheduled number of laps the original race had and the number of completed laps in all the previous parts. If the difference is less than three, the number of laps to go will be three laps.
- Only the riders which are included in the latest provisional race classificial are permitted to resume the race.
- Two minutes before the safety car exits the pits, the pit lane exit will be opened with indication of green lights and flags to allow all riders to bunch up behind the safety car in the order of the provisional race classification.
- Thirty seconds before the safety car exits the pits, all riders should be ready behind the safety car in the order of the provisional race classification.
- The pit lane exit will be closed with an indication of red flags and lights and the safety car will make one lap followed by all the riders upon announcement by the Race Direction. Overtaking the safety car is forbidden and any riders who remain in the pits will have to resume the race from there.
- In all cases, the time to go before the safety car leaves and the pit lane closes, must be shown on a countdown board or clock which is present in the pit lane exit or on the official timekeeping monitors.
- At the end of the safety car's lap, it will enter the pits whilst all riders continue on the circuit.
- The race will be resumed via a rolling start when the riders cross the start/finish line where two green flags will be waved on each side of the track and the green start lights will be turned on. At this time, a time penalty may be given by the Race Direction to any rider:

-who is not behind the rear wheel of the motorcycle in front of him.
-who is in a higher position than in the provisional race classification.
-who is more than three seconds behind the rider in front of him.

- After the last rider in the file has passed the pit lane exit, the green lights will be turned on and the green flag will be waved to allow the riders in the pits to resume the race.
- The final race classification will be created according to the position and the total number of laps of each rider at the time he crossed the start/finish line at the end of the race. The procedures of article 1.23.5. will apply in this case.

=== Technical regulations ===
- Following Yamaha decided to ditch carburetor fuel feed after 2002 season, all MotoGP motorcycle entrants would begin mandatorily utilizing fuel injection for the first time.
- The exposed edge of the exhaust pipe must be rounded to avoid any sharp edges. The last 30mm of the pipe must be horizontal and parallel to the center line of the bike with a tolerance of ±10 degrees.

== 2003 Grand Prix season results ==
| Round | Date | Grand Prix | Circuit | 125cc winner | 250cc winner | MotoGP winner | Report |
|---|---|---|---|---|---|---|---|
| 1 | 6 April | (Japan) Japanese motorcycle Grand Prix | Suzuka | (Italy) Stefano Perugini | (San Marino) Manuel Poggiali | (Italy) Valentino Rossi | Report |
| 2 | 27 April | (South Africa) South African motorcycle Grand Prix | Phakisa | (Spain) Daniel Pedrosa | (San Marino) Manuel Poggiali | (Spain) Sete Gibernau | Report |
| 3 | 11 May | (Spain) Spanish motorcycle Grand Prix | Jerez | (Italy) Lucio Cecchinello | (Spain) Toni Elías | (Italy) Valentino Rossi | Report |
| 4 | 25 May | (France) French motorcycle Grand Prix | Le Mans | (Spain) Daniel Pedrosa | (Spain) Toni Elías | (Spain) Sete Gibernau | Report |
| 5 | 8 June | (Italy) Italian motorcycle Grand Prix | Mugello | (Italy) Lucio Cecchinello | (San Marino) Manuel Poggiali | (Italy) Valentino Rossi | Report |
| 6 | 15 June | (Catalonia) Catalan motorcycle Grand Prix | Catalunya | (Spain) Daniel Pedrosa | (France) Randy de Puniet | (Italy) Loris Capirossi | Report |
| 7 | 28 June †† | (Netherlands) Dutch TT | Assen | (Germany) Steve Jenkner | (Australia) Anthony West | (Spain) Sete Gibernau | Report |
| 8 | 13 July | (United Kingdom) British motorcycle Grand Prix | Donington | (Spain) Héctor Barberá | (Spain) Fonsi Nieto | (Italy) Max Biaggi | Report |
| 9 | 27 July | (Germany) German motorcycle Grand Prix | Sachsenring | (Italy) Stefano Perugini | (Italy) Roberto Rolfo | (Spain) Sete Gibernau | Report |
| 10 | 17 August | Czech Republic motorcycle Grand Prix | Brno | (Spain) Daniel Pedrosa | (France) Randy de Puniet | (Italy) Valentino Rossi | Report |
| 11 | 7 September | (Portugal) Portuguese motorcycle Grand Prix | Estoril | (Spain) Pablo Nieto | (Spain) Toni Elías | (Italy) Valentino Rossi | Report |
| 12 | 20 September †† | (Rio de Janeiro (state)) Rio de Janeiro motorcycle Grand Prix | Rio de Janeiro | (Spain) Jorge Lorenzo | (San Marino) Manuel Poggiali | (Italy) Valentino Rossi | Report |
| 13 | 5 October | (Tochigi Prefecture) Pacific motorcycle Grand Prix | Motegi | (Spain) Héctor Barberá | (Spain) Toni Elías | (Italy) Max Biaggi | Report |
| 14 | 12 October | (Malaysia) Malaysian motorcycle Grand Prix | Sepang | (Spain) Daniel Pedrosa | (Spain) Toni Elías | (Italy) Valentino Rossi | Report |
| 15 | 19 October | (Australia) Australian motorcycle Grand Prix | Phillip Island | (Italy) Andrea Ballerini | (Italy) Roberto Rolfo | (Italy) Valentino Rossi | Report |
| 16 | 2 November | Valencian Community motorcycle Grand Prix | Valencia | (Australia) Casey Stoner | (France) Randy de Puniet | (Italy) Valentino Rossi | Report |

†† = Saturday Race

== Participants ==
=== MotoGP participants ===
| Team | Constructor | Motorcycle | Tyre | No. | Rider | Rounds |
|---|---|---|---|---|---|---|
| (Italy) Alice Aprilia Racing | Aprilia | RS Cube | M | 41 | (Japan) Noriyuki Haga | All |
| (Italy) Alice Aprilia Racing | Aprilia | RS Cube | M | 45 | (United States) Colin Edwards | All |
| (Italy) Ducati Marlboro Team | Ducati | Desmosedici GP3 | M | 12 | (Australia) Troy Bayliss | All |
| (Italy) Ducati Marlboro Team | Ducati | Desmosedici GP3 | M | 65 | (Italy) Loris Capirossi | All |
| (United Kingdom) WCM | Harris WCM | Harris WCM | D | 35 | (United Kingdom) Chris Burns | 1, 11–16 |
| (United Kingdom) WCM | Harris WCM | Harris WCM | D | 52 | (Spain) José David de Gea | 11–16 |
| (United Kingdom) WCM | ROC Yamaha | ROC Yamaha | D | 35 | (United Kingdom) Chris Burns | 8–10 |
| (United Kingdom) WCM | Sabre V4 | Sabre V4 | D | 52 | (Spain) José David de Gea | 8–10 |
| (Japan) Repsol Honda | Honda | RC211V | M | 46 | (Italy) Valentino Rossi | All |
| (Japan) Repsol Honda | Honda | RC211V | M | 69 | (United States) Nicky Hayden | All |
| (Spain) Camel Pramac Pons | Honda | RC211V | M | 3 | (Italy) Max Biaggi | All |
| (Spain) Camel Pramac Pons | Honda | RC211V | M | 11 | (Japan) Tohru Ukawa | All |
| (Italy) Telefónica Movistar Honda | Honda | RC211V | M | 15 | (Spain) Sete Gibernau | All |
| (Italy) Telefónica Movistar Honda | Honda | RC211V | M | 74 | (Japan) Daijiro Kato | 1 |
| (Italy) Telefónica Movistar Honda | Honda | RC211V | M | 23 | (Japan) Ryuichi Kiyonari | 4–16 |
| (Italy) Pramac Honda | Honda | RC211V | B | 6 | (Japan) Makoto Tamada | All |
| (Japan) Kawasaki Racing Team | Kawasaki | Ninja ZX-RR | D | 8 | (Australia) Garry McCoy | All |
| (Japan) Kawasaki Racing Team | Kawasaki | Ninja ZX-RR | D | 88 | (Australia) Andrew Pitt | All |
| (Japan) Kawasaki Racing Team | Kawasaki | Ninja ZX-RR | D | 48 | (Japan) Akira Yanagawa | 1, 6 |
| (Japan) Kawasaki Racing Team | Kawasaki | Ninja ZX-RR | D | 66 | (Germany) Alex Hofmann | 3, 5, 7, 9–10 |
| (Japan) Moriwaki Racing WCM | MD211VF Proto | MD211VF Proto | D | 25 | (Japan) Tamaki Serizawa | 1 |
| (Japan) Moriwaki Racing | Moriwaki | MD211VF Proto | D | 25 | (Japan) Tamaki Serizawa | 13 |
| (Malaysia) / (United States) Proton Team KR | Proton KR | KR3; KR5 | B | 9 | (Japan) Nobuatsu Aoki | All |
| (Malaysia) / (United States) Proton Team KR | Proton KR | KR3; KR5 | B | 99 | (United Kingdom) Jeremy McWilliams | All |
| (Japan) Suzuki Grand Prix Team | Suzuki | GSV-R | M | 10 | (United States) Kenny Roberts Jr. | 1–5, 9–16 |
| (Japan) Suzuki Grand Prix Team | Suzuki | GSV-R | M | 21 | (United States) John Hopkins | 1–13, 15–16 |
| (Japan) Suzuki Grand Prix Team | Suzuki | GSV-R | M | 71 | (Japan) Yukio Kagayama | 7–8 |
| (Japan) Suzuki Grand Prix Team | Suzuki | GSV-R | M | 43 | (Japan) Akira Ryō | 14 |
| (Japan) Team Suzuki | Suzuki | GSV-R | M | 43 | (Japan) Akira Ryō | 13 |
| (Japan) Fortuna Yamaha Team | Yamaha | YZR-M1 | M | 7 | (Spain) Carlos Checa | All |
| (Japan) Fortuna Yamaha Team | Yamaha | YZR-M1 | M | 33 | (Italy) Marco Melandri | 1, 3–15 |
| (Japan) Fortuna Yamaha Team | Yamaha | YZR-M1 | M | 17 | (Japan) Norifumi Abe | 1–2, 16 |
| (Japan) Yamaha Racing Team | Yamaha | YZR-M1 | M | 17 | (Japan) Norifumi Abe | 4, 9 |
| (France) Gauloises Yamaha Team | Yamaha | YZR-M1 | M | 4 | (Brazil) Alex Barros | All |
| (France) Gauloises Yamaha Team | Yamaha | YZR-M1 | M | 19 | (France) Olivier Jacque | All |
| (Spain) d'Antín Yamaha Team | Yamaha | YZR-M1 | M | 56 | (Japan) Shinya Nakano | All |

Key
Regular rider
Wildcard rider
Replacement rider

==== Team changes ====
- After fourteen consecutive seasons since 1989 in exception of 2000 and 2001, Kanemoto Racing officially shut down its MotoGP programme due to lack of funds and sponsorship.

=== 250cc participants ===
| Team | Constructor | Motorcycle | No. | Rider | Rounds |
|---|---|---|---|---|---|
| Fortuna Honda | Honda | Honda RS250RW | 3 | (Italy) Roberto Rolfo | All |
| Telefónica Movistar Junior Team | Honda | Honda RS250RW | 5 | (Argentina) Sebastián Porto | All |
| Troll Honda BQR | Honda | Honda RS250R | 6 | (Spain) Alex Debón | All |
| Troll Honda BQR | Honda | Honda RS250R | 34 | (Andorra) Eric Bataille | All |
| Safilo Oxydo - LCR | Aprilia | Aprilia RSV 250 | 7 | (France) Randy de Puniet | All |
| Yamaha Kurz | Yamaha | Yamaha YZR 250 | 8 | (Japan) Naoki Matsudo | All |
| Yamaha Kurz | Yamaha | Yamaha YZR 250 | 13 | (Czech Republic) Jaroslav Huleš | 1–5 |
| Yamaha Kurz | Yamaha | Yamaha YZR 250 | 52 | (Czech Republic) Lukáš Pešek | 6, 9–16 |
| Yamaha Kurz | Yamaha | Yamaha YZR 250 | 29 | (Italy) Christian Pistoni | 7 |
| Équipe de France - Scrab GP | Aprilia | Aprilia RSV 250 | 9 | (France) Hugo Marchand | All |
| Équipe de France - Scrab GP | Aprilia | Aprilia RSV 250 | 36 | (France) Erwan Nigon | All |
| Team Repsol Telefónica Movistar | Aprilia | Aprilia RSV 250 | 10 | (Spain) Fonsi Nieto | All |
| Team Repsol Telefónica Movistar | Aprilia | Aprilia RSV 250 | 24 | (Spain) Toni Elías | All |
| Aspar Junior Team | Aprilia | Aprilia RSV 250 | 11 | (Spain) Joan Olivé | All |
| Aspar Junior Team | Aprilia | Aprilia RSV 250 | 33 | (Spain) Héctor Faubel | All |
| Elit Grand Prix | Honda | Honda RS250R | | | |
| Elit Grand Prix | Honda | Honda RS250R | 96 | (Czech Republic) Jakub Smrž | 1–11 |
| Elit Grand Prix | Honda | Honda RS250R | 13 | (Czech Republic) Jaroslav Huleš | 12–16 |
| Team Zoppini Abruzzo | Aprilia | Aprilia RSV 250 | 14 | (Australia) Anthony West | All |
| Team Zoppini Abruzzo | Aprilia | Aprilia RSV 250 | 16 | (Sweden) Johan Stigefelt | All |
| Kiefer Castrol-Honda Racing | Honda | Honda RS250R | 15 | (Germany) Christian Gemmel | All |
| Dark Dog Molenaar | Honda | Honda RS250R | 18 | (Netherlands) Henk van de Lagemaat | All |
| Dark Dog Molenaar | Honda | Honda RS250R | 98 | (Germany) Katja Poensgen | 1–12, 14–15 |
| Dark Dog Molenaar | Honda | Honda RS250R | 96 | (Czech Republic) Jakub Smrž | 13, 16 |
| Campetella Racing | Aprilia | Aprilia RSV 250 | 21 | (Italy) Franco Battaini | All |
| Campetella Racing | Aprilia | Aprilia RSV 250 | 50 | (France) Sylvain Guintoli | All |
| Campetella Racing | Aprilia | Aprilia RSV 250 | 73 | (Czech Republic) Radomil Rous | 16 |
| Matteoni Racing | Aprilia | Aprilia RSV 250 | 26 | (Italy) Alex Baldolini | All |
| Aprilia Germany | Aprilia | Aprilia RSV 250 | 28 | (Germany) Dirk Heidolf | 1–4, 8–16 |
| Aprilia Germany | Aprilia | Aprilia RSV 250 | 29 | (Italy) Christian Pistoni | 5 |
| Aprilia Germany | Aprilia | Aprilia RSV 250 | 30 | (Germany) Klaus Nöhles | 6–7 |
| Aprilia Germany | Aprilia | Aprilia RSV 250 | 57 | (United Kingdom) Chaz Davies | All |
| Oscar Competition | Honda | Honda RS250R | | | |
| Oscar Competition | Honda | Honda RS250R | 31 | (France) Christophe Rastel | 6 |
| Córdoba Patrimonio de la Humanidad | Yamaha | Yamaha YZR 250 | | | |
| Córdoba Patrimonio de la Humanidad | Yamaha | Yamaha YZR 250 | 39 | (Spain) Luis Castro | 3 |
| Equipo Andalucía AMF | Aprilia | Aprilia RSV 250 | | | |
| Equipo Andalucía AMF | Aprilia | Aprilia RSV 250 | 40 | (Spain) Álvaro Molina | 3 |
| MAS Racing Team | Aprilia | Aprilia RSV 250 | 40 | (Spain) Álvaro Molina | 6, 11, 16 |
| Marina Park Mavi Sport Kurz | Yamaha | Yamaha YZR 250 | | | |
| Marina Park Mavi Sport Kurz | Yamaha | Yamaha YZR 250 | 41 | (Portugal) Miguel Praia | 11 |
| Equipe de France | Honda | Honda RS250R | | | |
| Equipe de France | Honda | Honda RS250R | 42 | (France) Grégory Leblanc | 3, 16 |
| Eisen Moto Team | Honda | Honda RS250R | | | |
| Eisen Moto Team | Honda | Honda RS250R | 44 | (France) Vincent Eisen | 4 |
| Team Racer Bike | Honda | Honda RS250R | | | |
| Team Racer Bike | Honda | Honda RS250R | 45 | (France) Samuel Aubry | 4 |
| MRTT | Honda | Honda RS250R | | | |
| MRTT | Honda | Honda RS250R | 46 | (Netherlands) Jan Blok | 7 |
| J&E Sport Kunstgras | Yamaha | Yamaha YZR 250 | | | |
| J&E Sport Kunstgras | Yamaha | Yamaha YZR 250 | 47 | (Netherlands) Arie Vos | 7, 10 |
| Performance Racing | Honda | Honda RS250R | | | |
| Performance Racing | Honda | Honda RS250R | 48 | (Netherlands) Hans Smees | 7 |
| De Arend Horeca Meubilair | Honda | Honda RS250R | | | |
| De Arend Horeca Meubilair | Honda | Honda RS250R | 49 | (Netherlands) Randy Gevers | 7 |
| Watz Racing | Yamaha | Yamaha YZR 250 | | | |
| Watz Racing | Yamaha | Yamaha YZR 250 | 51 | (Sweden) Frederik Watz | 11 |
| MS Aprilia Team | Aprilia | Aprilia RSV 250 | 54 | (San Marino) Manuel Poggiali | All |
| Galemain Racing | Yamaha | Yamaha YZR 250 | | | |
| Galemain Racing | Yamaha | Yamaha YZR 250 | 58 | (United Kingdom) Lee Dickinson | 8 |
| St. Neots Motorcycle | Honda | Honda RS250R | | | |
| St. Neots Motorcycle | Honda | Honda RS250R | 59 | (United Kingdom) Andrew Sawford | 8 |
| AVS/Race to Win | Yamaha | Yamaha YZR 250 | | | |
| AVS/Race to Win | Yamaha | Yamaha YZR 250 | 60 | (United Kingdom) Phillip Desborough | 8 |
| Neukirchner R.T. ADAC Sachse | Honda | Honda RS250R | | | |
| Neukirchner R.T. ADAC Sachse | Honda | Honda RS250R | 62 | (Germany) Max Neukirchner | 9 |
| Bernd Hermann Racing Team | Honda | Honda RS250R | | | |
| Bernd Hermann Racing Team | Honda | Honda RS250R | 63 | (Sweden) Tomas Palander | 9 |
| KR-EATIV de Kehrer Racing | Honda | Honda RS250R | | | |
| KR-EATIV de Kehrer Racing | Honda | Honda RS250R | 64 | (Germany) Nico Kehrer | 9 |
| MSC Schleizer Drejeck | Honda | Honda RS250R | | | |
| MSC Schleizer Drejeck | Honda | Honda RS250R | 65 | (Germany) Norman Rank | 9 |
| Raistila Racing | Yamaha | Yamaha YZR 250 | | | |
| Raistila Racing | Yamaha | Yamaha YZR 250 | 66 | (Finland) Vesa Kallio | 9–11 |
| SP Tadao Racing Team | Yamaha | Yamaha YZR 250 | | | |
| SP Tadao Racing Team | Yamaha | Yamaha YZR 250 | 67 | (Japan) Tomoyoshi Koyama | 1, 13 |
| SP Tadao Racing Team | Yamaha | Yamaha YZR 250 | 71 | (Japan) Katsuyuki Nakasuga | 1 |
| Hitman RC Koshien Yamaha | Yamaha | Yamaha YZR 250 | | | |
| Hitman RC Koshien Yamaha | Yamaha | Yamaha YZR 250 | 68 | (Japan) Tekkyu Kayo | 1 |
| J Racing | Yamaha | Yamaha YZR 250 | | | |
| J Racing | Yamaha | Yamaha YZR 250 | 69 | (Japan) Masaki Tokudome | 13 |
| Burning Blood RT | Honda | Honda RS250R | | | |
| Burning Blood RT | Honda | Honda RS250R | 70 | (Japan) Choujun Kameya | 13 |
| Dy Do Miu Racing Team | Honda | Honda RS250R | | | |
| Dy Do Miu Racing Team | Honda | Honda RS250R | 72 | (Japan) Yuki Takahashi | 1, 13 |
| KLUB Team Racing Znojmo | Aprilia | Aprilia RSV 250 | | | |
| KLUB Team Racing Znojmo | Aprilia | Aprilia RSV 250 | 73 | (Czech Republic) Radomil Rous | 10 |
| TKB AMK Brno Racing Team | Yamaha | Yamaha YZR 250 | | | |
| TKB AMK Brno Racing Team | Yamaha | Yamaha YZR 250 | 74 | (Czech Republic) Michal Filla | 10 |
| Biro Racing Team | Honda | Honda RS250R | | | |
| Biro Racing Team | Honda | Honda RS250R | 75 | (Hungary) Gábor Rizmayer | 10 |
| Team Underwood Diesel Express | Yamaha | Yamaha YZR 250 | | | |
| Team Underwood Diesel Express | Yamaha | Yamaha YZR 250 | 76 | (Australia) Brett Underwood | 15 |
| Turramurra Cyclery | Yamaha | Yamaha YZR 250 | | | |
| Turramurra Cyclery | Yamaha | Yamaha YZR 250 | 77 | (Australia) Mark Rowling | 15 |
| EMS Racing | Honda | Honda RS250R | | | |
| EMS Racing | Honda | Honda RS250R | 78 | (Australia) Peter Taplin | 15 |
| Hardcastle Communication Racing | Yamaha | Yamaha YZR 250 | | | |
| Hardcastle Communication Racing | Yamaha | Yamaha YZR 250 | 79 | (Australia) Geoff Hardcastle | 15 |
| Awesome Discs Racing | Honda | Honda RS250R | | | |
| Awesome Discs Racing | Honda | Honda RS250R | 80 | (Australia) Rodney Camm | 15 |
| Madifchina d'Antin Yamaha | Yamaha | Yamaha YZR 250 | | | |
| Madifchina d'Antin Yamaha | Yamaha | Yamaha YZR 250 | 81 | (China) Shi Zhao Huang | 14 |
| Madifchina d'Antin Yamaha | Yamaha | Yamaha YZR 250 | 82 | (China) Zi Xian He | 14 |
| Team Holland | Aprilia | Aprilia RSV 250 | | | |
| Team Holland | Aprilia | Aprilia RSV 250 | 83 | (Netherlands) Patrick Lakerveld | 16 |
| Kiefer Castrol Honda | Honda | Honda RS250R | | | |
| Kiefer Castrol Honda | Honda | Honda RS250R | 84 | (Austria) Yves Polzer | 16 |
| Team Harc-Pro | Honda | Honda RS250R | | | |
| Team Harc-Pro | Honda | Honda RS250R | 92 | (Japan) Hiroshi Aoyama | 1, 13 |

Key
Regular rider
Wildcard rider
Replacement rider

=== 125cc participants ===
| Team | Constructor | Motorcycle | No. | Rider | Rounds |
|---|---|---|---|---|---|
| Red Bull KTM | KTM | KTM 125 FRR | 1 | (France) Arnaud Vincent | 1–9 |
| Red Bull KTM | KTM | KTM 125 FRR | 10 | (Italy) Roberto Locatelli | All |
| Red Bull KTM | KTM | KTM 125 FRR | 36 | (Finland) Mika Kallio | 10–16 |
| Sterilgarda Racing | Aprilia | Aprilia RS125R | | | |
| Sterilgarda Racing | Aprilia | Aprilia RS125R | 41 | (Japan) Youichi Ui | 1–10 |
| Sterilgarda Racing | Aprilia | Aprilia RS125R | 1 | (France) Arnaud Vincent | 11–16 |
| Sterilgarda Racing | Aprilia | Aprilia RS125R | 42 | (Italy) Gioele Pellino | All |
| Telefónica Movistar Junior Team | Honda | Honda RS125R | 3 | (Spain) Dani Pedrosa | 1–15 |
| Safilo Oxydo - LCR | Aprilia | Aprilia RS125R | 4 | (Italy) Lucio Cecchinello | All |
| Safilo Oxydo - LCR | Aprilia | Aprilia RS125R | 27 | (Australia) Casey Stoner | All |
| Matteoni Racing | Aprilia | Aprilia RS125R | 6 | (Italy) Mirko Giansanti | All |
| Matteoni Racing | Aprilia | Aprilia RS125R | 58 | (Italy) Marco Simoncelli | All |
| Abruzzo Racing | Aprilia | Aprilia RS125R | 7 | (Italy) Stefano Perugini | All |
| Abruzzo Racing | Aprilia | Aprilia RS125R | 11 | (Italy) Max Sabbatani | All |
| Ajo Motorsport | Honda | Honda RS125R | 8 | (Japan) Masao Azuma | All |
| Ajo Motorsport | Honda | Honda RS125R | 36 | (Finland) Mika Kallio | 1–9 |
| Ajo Motorsport | Honda | Honda RS125R | 39 | (Japan) Hiroyuki Kikuchi | 10 |
| Ajo Motorsport | Honda | Honda RS125R | 50 | (Italy) Andrea Ballerini | 11–16 |
| Elit Grand Prix | Honda | Honda RS125R | 12 | (Switzerland) Thomas Lüthi | All |
| Seedorf Racing | Aprilia | Aprilia RS125R | 14 | (United Kingdom) Chris Martin | 1–6 |
| Seedorf Racing | Aprilia | Aprilia RS125R | 88 | (Denmark) Robbin Harms | 7, 9–16 |
| Seedorf Racing | Aprilia | Aprilia RS125R | 81 | (Spain) Ismael Ortega | 8 |
| Seedorf Racing | Aprilia | Aprilia RS125R | 19 | (Spain) Álvaro Bautista | All |
| Seedorf Racing | Aprilia | Aprilia RS125R | 81 | (Spain) Ismael Ortega | 3, 6, 11, 16 |
| Seedorf Racing | Aprilia | Aprilia RS125R | 88 | (Denmark) Robbin Harms | 5 |
| Globet.com Racing | Aprilia | Aprilia RS125R | 15 | (San Marino) Alex de Angelis | All |
| Globet.com Racing | Aprilia | Aprilia RS125R | 23 | (Italy) Gino Borsoi | All |
| Exalt Cycle Red Devil | Aprilia | Aprilia RS125R | 17 | (Germany) Steve Jenkner | All |
| Exalt Cycle Red Devil | Aprilia | Aprilia RS125R | 79 | (Hungary) Gábor Talmácsi | All |
| MetaSystem Racing Service | Honda | Honda RS125R | 21 | (United Kingdom) Leon Camier | 1–9 |
| MetaSystem Racing Service | Honda | Honda RS125R | 50 | (Italy) Andrea Ballerini | 10 |
| MetaSystem Racing Service | Honda | Honda RS125R | 60 | (Italy) Mattia Angeloni | 11 |
| MetaSystem Racing Service | Honda | Honda RS125R | 63 | (France) Mike Di Meglio | 12–16 |
| MetaSystem Racing Service | Honda | Honda RS125R | 78 | (Hungary) Péter Lénárt | 1–11 |
| MetaSystem Racing Service | Honda | Honda RS125R | 28 | (Italy) Michele Danese | 12–16 |
| Master - Mx Onda - Aspar | Aprilia | Aprilia RS125R | 22 | (Spain) Pablo Nieto | All |
| Master - Mx Onda - Aspar | Aprilia | Aprilia RS125R | 80 | (Spain) Héctor Barberá | All |
| Team Scot | Honda | Honda RS125R | 24 | (Italy) Simone Corsi | All |
| Team Scot | Honda | Honda RS125R | 34 | (Italy) Andrea Dovizioso | All |
| Road Racing Team Hungary | Honda | Honda RS125R | 25 | (Hungary) Imre Tóth | All |
| Caja Madrid Derbi Racing | Derbi | Derbi 125 GP | 26 | (Spain) Emilio Alzamora | All |
| Caja Madrid Derbi Racing | Derbi | Derbi 125 GP | 48 | (Spain) Jorge Lorenzo | All |
| Semprucci - Angaia Malaguti | Malaguti | Malaguti 125GP | 31 | (Spain) Julián Simón | All |
| Semprucci - Angaia Malaguti | Malaguti | Malaguti 125GP | 32 | (Italy) Fabrizio Lai | All |
| Metis Gilera Racing | Gilera | Gilera 125 GP | 33 | (Italy) Stefano Bianco | 1–4, 7–16 |
| Metis Gilera Racing | Gilera | Gilera 125 GP | 50 | (Italy) Andrea Ballerini | 5–6 |
| Freesoul Racing | Aprilia | Aprilia RS125R | | | |
| Freesoul Racing | Aprilia | Aprilia RS125R | 63 | (France) Mike Di Meglio | 1–10 |
| Freesoul Racing | Gilera | Gilera 125 GP | 41 | (Japan) Youichi Ui | 11–16 |
| Team Costa Cálida | Aprilia | Aprilia RS125R | | | |
| Team Costa Cálida | Aprilia | Aprilia RS125R | 43 | (Spain) Manuel Hernández | 16 |
| Grand Prix Training Centre | Honda | Honda RS125R | | | |
| Grand Prix Training Centre | Honda | Honda RS125R | 44 | (Australia) Joshua Waters | 15 |
| Tassie Windscreens Simmonds | Honda | Honda RS125R | | | |
| Tassie Windscreens Simmonds | Honda | Honda RS125R | 45 | (Australia) Brett Simmonds | 15 |
| Matt Attack Racing | Honda | Honda RS125R | | | |
| Matt Attack Racing | Honda | Honda RS125R | 46 | (Australia) Matthew Kuhne | 15 |
| Macadam Racing | Honda | Honda RS125R | | | |
| Macadam Racing | Honda | Honda RS125R | 49 | (United Kingdom) Lee Longden | 8 |
| Red Bull Rookies | Honda | Honda RS125R | | | |
| Red Bull Rookies | Honda | Honda RS125R | 50 | (United Kingdom) Midge Smart | 8 |
| Brooklands Autobody Racing | Honda | Honda RS125R | | | |
| Brooklands Autobody Racing | Honda | Honda RS125R | 51 | (United Kingdom) Kris Weston | 8 |
| RZT Repsol Racing Team | Honda | Honda RS125R | | | |
| RZT Repsol Racing Team | Honda | Honda RS125R | 52 | (Germany) Jarno Müller | 9 |
| ADAC Sachsen e.V. | Honda | Honda RS125R | | | |
| ADAC Sachsen e.V. | Honda | Honda RS125R | 53 | (Germany) Manuel Mickan | 9 |
| ADAC Sachsenring Jr. Racing Services | Honda | Honda RS125R | | | |
| ADAC Sachsenring Jr. Racing Services | Honda | Honda RS125R | 54 | (Germany) Patrick Unger | 9 |
| OMV Team Hanusch | Honda | Honda RS125R | | | |
| OMV Team Hanusch | Honda | Honda RS125R | 55 | (Czech Republic) Igor Kaláb | 10 |
| OMV Team Hanusch | Honda | Honda RS125R | 91 | (Germany) Jascha Büch | 9 |
| Elcom-IPC Heron Racing Team | Honda | Honda RS125R | | | |
| Elcom-IPC Heron Racing Team | Honda | Honda RS125R | 56 | (Czech Republic) Markéta Janáková | 10 |
| Lines Racing | Honda | Honda RS125R | | | |
| Lines Racing | Honda | Honda RS125R | 57 | (Slovakia) Luka Nedog | 10 |
| Honda Hamamatsu Escargot | Honda | Honda RS125R | | | |
| Honda Hamamatsu Escargot | Honda | Honda RS125R | 59 | (Japan) Hiroaki Kuzuhara | 13 |
| Team Leardni | Honda | Honda RS125R | | | |
| Team Leardni | Honda | Honda RS125R | 60 | (Italy) Mattia Angeloni | 5 |
| RCGM | Aprilia | Aprilia RS125R | | | |
| RCGM | Aprilia | Aprilia RS125R | 61 | (Italy) Michele Pirro | 5 |
| Engines Engineering | Malaguti | Malaguti 125GP | | | |
| Engines Engineering | Malaguti | Malaguti 125GP | 62 | (Italy) Alessio Aldrovandi | 5 |
| Cheung Wing Team | Honda | Honda RS125R | | | |
| Cheung Wing Team | Honda | Honda RS125R | 64 | (China) Cheung Wai On | 1 |
| S-Way & Revive | Honda | Honda RS125R | | | |
| S-Way & Revive | Honda | Honda RS125R | 65 | (Japan) Toshika Kuzuhara | 1 |
| Honda Kumamoto Racing | Honda | Honda RS125R | 65 | (Japan) Toshika Kuzuhara | 13 |
| Team Harc Pro | Honda | Honda RS125R | 65 | | |
| Team Harc Pro | Honda | Honda RS125R | 66 | (Japan) Shuhei Aoyama | 1, 13 |
| Team Life Hatada; Team Life | Honda | Honda RS125R | | | |
| Team Life Hatada; Team Life | Honda | Honda RS125R | 67 | (Japan) Akio Tanaka | 1 |
| Team Life Hatada; Team Life | Honda | Honda RS125R | 68 | (Japan) Sadahito Suma | 1 |
| Team Life Hatada; Team Life | Honda | Honda RS125R | 94 | (Japan) Sadahito Suma | 13 |
| 4 Racing | TSR | Honda RS125R | | | |
| 4 Racing | TSR | Honda RS125R | 69 | (Spain) David Bonache | 3 |
| 4 Racing | Honda | Honda RS125R | 69 | (Spain) David Bonache | 6, 11, 16 |
| Racing Team Gadea | Aprilia | Aprilia RS125R | 69 | | |
| Racing Team Gadea | Aprilia | Aprilia RS125R | 70 | (Spain) Sergio Gadea | 3, 6, 11, 16 |
| Mir Racing | Aprilia | Aprilia RS125R | | | |
| Mir Racing | Aprilia | Aprilia RS125R | 71 | (Spain) Rubén Catalán | 3 |
| Equipe de France Espoir | Honda | Honda RS125R | | | |
| Equipe de France Espoir | Honda | Honda RS125R | 72 | (France) Alexis Masbou | 4 |
| Equipe de France Espoir | Honda | Honda RS125R | 73 | (France) William Gautier | 4 |
| Racing Moto Sport | Honda | Honda RS125R | | | |
| Racing Moto Sport | Honda | Honda RS125R | 74 | (France) Jimmy Petit | 4 |
| DB Racing Team | Honda | Honda RS125R | | | |
| DB Racing Team | Honda | Honda RS125R | 75 | (Netherlands) Adri den Bekker | 7 |
| Tennen Racing Team | Honda | Honda RS125R | | | |
| Tennen Racing Team | Honda | Honda RS125R | 76 | (Netherlands) Jarno van der Marel | 7 |
| Schouten Racing | Honda | Honda RS125R | | | |
| Schouten Racing | Honda | Honda RS125R | 77 | (Netherlands) Raymond Schouten | 7 |
| TMR Competició | Honda | Honda RS125R | | | |
| TMR Competició | Honda | Honda RS125R | 82 | (Spain) Jordi Carchano | 6 |
| SP125Racing.com | Honda | Honda RS125R | | | |
| SP125Racing.com | Honda | Honda RS125R | 83 | (United Kingdom) Chester Lusk | 8 |
| Banks Racing/GR Motorsport | Honda | Honda RS125R | | | |
| Banks Racing/GR Motorsport | Honda | Honda RS125R | 84 | (United Kingdom) Paul Veazey | 8 |
| Mob 77 | Honda | Honda RS125R | | | |
| Mob 77 | Honda | Honda RS125R | 85 | (France) Xavier Herouin | 4 |
| Provence Moto Sport | Honda | Honda RS125R | | | |
| Provence Moto Sport | Honda | Honda RS125R | 86 | (France) Gregory Lefort | 4 |
| BNT Racing | Honda | Honda RS125R | | | |
| BNT Racing | Honda | Honda RS125R | 87 | (Italy) Michele Conti | 5 |
| Racing Team MVK | Honda | Honda RS125R | | | |
| Racing Team MVK | Honda | Honda RS125R | 89 | (Netherlands) Mark van Kreij | 7 |
| ADAC Berlin | Honda | Honda RS125R | | | |
| ADAC Berlin | Honda | Honda RS125R | 90 | (Germany) Dario Giuseppetti | 9, 16 |
| BRC Racing Team | Honda | Honda RS125R | | | |
| BRC Racing Team | Honda | Honda RS125R | 92 | (Czech Republic) Václav Bittman | 10 |
| Matteoni Racing | Aprilia | Aprilia RS125R | | | |
| Matteoni Racing | Aprilia | Aprilia RS125R | 93 | (Italy) Manuel Manna | 11 |
| JHA Racing | Honda | Honda RS125R | | | |
| JHA Racing | Honda | Honda RS125R | 95 | (Japan) Yuki Hatano | 13 |

Key
Regular rider
Wildcard rider
Replacement rider

== Standings ==
=== MotoGP standings ===
Scoring system

Points were awarded to the top fifteen finishers. A rider had to finish the race to earn points.

| Position | **1st** | **2nd** | **3rd** | **4th** | **5th** | **6th** | **7th** | **8th** | **9th** | **10th** | **11th** | **12th** | **13th** | **14th** | **15th** |
| Points | 25 | 20 | 16 | 13 | 11 | 10 | 9 | 8 | 7 | 6 | 5 | 4 | 3 | 2 | 1 |

- Rounds marked with a light blue background were under wet race conditions or stopped by rain.
- Riders marked with light blue background were eligible for Rookie of the Year awards.

==== Riders' standings ====
| Pos | Rider | Bike | Team | JPN (Japan) | RSA (South Africa) | SPA (Spain) | FRA (France) | ITA (Italy) | CAT (Catalonia) | NED (Netherlands) | GBR (United Kingdom) | GER (Germany) | CZE (Czech Republic) | POR (Portugal) | RIO (Rio de Janeiro (state)) | PAC (Tochigi Prefecture) | MAL (Malaysia) | AUS (Australia) | VAL (Valencian Community) | Pts |
|---|---|---|---|---|---|---|---|---|---|---|---|---|---|---|---|---|---|---|---|---|
| 1 | (Italy) Valentino Rossi | Honda | Repsol Honda | **1** | 2 | 1 | **2** | **1** | **2** | 3 | 3 | 2 | **1** | 1 | **1** | 2 | **1** | **1** | **1** | 357 |
| 2 | (Spain) Sete Gibernau | Honda | Telefónica Movistar Honda | 4 | **1** | Ret | 1 | 7 | 3 | 1 | 2 | 1 | 2 | 4 | 2 | 4 | 2 | 4 | 2 | 277 |
| 3 | (Italy) Max Biaggi | Honda | Camel Pramac Pons | 2 | 3 | 2 | 5 | 3 | 14 | 2 | **1** | **Ret** | 5 | 2 | 4 | **1** | 3 | 17 | 4 | 228 |
| 4 | (Italy) Loris Capirossi | Ducati | Ducati Marlboro Team | 3 | Ret | **Ret** | Ret | 2 | 1 | **6** | 4 | 4 | Ret | **3** | 6 | 8 | 6 | 2 | 3 | 177 |
| 5 | (United States) Nicky Hayden | Honda | Repsol Honda | 7 | 7 | Ret | 12 | 12 | 9 | 11 | 8 | 5 | 6 | 9 | 5 | 3 | 4 | 3 | 16 | 130 |
| 6 | (Australia) Troy Bayliss | Ducati | Ducati Marlboro Team | 5 | 4 | 3 | Ret | Ret | 10 | 9 | 5 | 3 | 3 | 6 | 10 | Ret | 9 | Ret | 7 | 128 |
| 7 | (Spain) Carlos Checa | Yamaha | Fortuna Yamaha Team | 10 | 9 | Ret | Ret | 8 | 4 | 4 | 6 | 8 | 4 | 8 | 9 | Ret | 5 | 8 | 5 | 123 |
| 8 | (Japan) Tohru Ukawa | Honda | Camel Pramac Pons | 20 | 6 | 4 | 7 | 6 | 6 | 12 | Ret | 6 | 8 | 5 | 7 | 7 | 7 | 5 | Ret | 123 |
| 9 | (Brazil) Alex Barros | Yamaha | Gauloises Yamaha Team | 8 | 5 | 5 | 3 | Ret | 8 | 8 | DNS | Ret | 7 | 11 | 12 | 6 | 15 | Ret | 6 | 101 |
| 10 | (Japan) Shinya Nakano | Yamaha | d'Antín Yamaha Team | 9 | 11 | 8 | 14 | 5 | 5 | 13 | 9 | 7 | 14 | 12 | 8 | 9 | 8 | 7 | Ret | 101 |
| 11 | (Japan) Makoto Tamada | Honda | Pramac Honda | Ret | 14 | 6 | Ret | 4 | 7 | 16 | 13 | 13 | 9 | 10 | 3 | DSQ | 10 | 10 | 10 | 87 |
| 12 | (France) Olivier Jacque | Yamaha | Gauloises Yamaha Team | 15 | 10 | 10 | 4 | 10 | Ret | 5 | Ret | 9 | 11 | 13 | Ret | 13 | Ret | 6 | Ret | 71 |
| 13 | (United States) Colin Edwards | Aprilia | Alice Aprilia Racing | 6 | Ret | 14 | 10 | 9 | Ret | 7 | 10 | 14 | 12 | 14 | 13 | 17 | 13 | 16 | 8 | 62 |
| 14 | (Japan) Noriyuki Haga | Aprilia | Alice Aprilia Racing | 12 | Ret | 11 | 8 | Ret | 12 | Ret | 7 | Ret | 13 | 15 | 14 | 12 | 12 | 14 | 15 | 47 |
| 15 | (Italy) Marco Melandri | Yamaha | Fortuna Yamaha Team | WD | | 17 | 15 | 11 | 13 | Ret | Ret | Ret | 10 | 7 | 11 | 5 | 11 | Ret | | 45 |
| 16 | (Japan) Norifumi Abe | Yamaha | Fortuna Yamaha Team | 11 | 8 | | | | | | | | | | | | | | 9 | 31 |
| 16 | (Japan) Norifumi Abe | Yamaha | Yamaha Racing Team | | | | 11 | | | | | 10 | | | | | | | | 31 |
| 17 | (United States) John Hopkins | Suzuki | Suzuki Grand Prix Team | 13 | 13 | 7 | Ret | Ret | 15 | 15 | 11 | Ret | 17 | 18 | DNS | Ret | | 12 | 13 | 29 |
| 18 | (United Kingdom) Jeremy McWilliams | Proton KR | Proton Team KR | Ret | Ret | 12 | 6 | Ret | Ret | Ret | Ret | 12 | Ret | 19 | 16 | Ret | 17 | 11 | 12 | 27 |
| 19 | (United States) Kenny Roberts Jr. | Suzuki | Suzuki Grand Prix Team | 14 | 15 | 13 | 16 | Ret | | | | 15 | 20 | 17 | 17 | 15 | 14 | 9 | 11 | 22 |
| 20 | (Japan) Ryuichi Kiyonari | Honda | Telefónica Movistar Honda | | | | 13 | 13 | 11 | 17 | 14 | 18 | 15 | 16 | 15 | 11 | 21 | 19 | 14 | 22 |
| 21 | (Japan) Nobuatsu Aoki | Proton KR | Proton Team KR | Ret | 12 | 9 | Ret | Ret | 16 | Ret | 15 | 11 | Ret | 20 | Ret | 14 | 18 | 18 | 17 | 19 |
| 22 | (Australia) Garry McCoy | Kawasaki | Kawasaki Racing Team | 16 | 17 | 18 | 9 | 15 | 17 | 18 | 16 | 16 | 18 | Ret | Ret | Ret | 19 | 13 | 19 | 11 |
| 23 | (Germany) Alex Hofmann | Kawasaki | Kawasaki Racing Team | | | 16 | | 14 | | 10 | | 17 | 19 | | | | | | | 8 |
| 24 | (Japan) Akira Ryō | Suzuki | Team Suzuki | | | | | | | | | | | | | 10 | | | | 6 |
| 24 | (Japan) Akira Ryō | Suzuki | Suzuki Grand Prix Team | | | | | | | | | | | | | | 20 | | | 6 |
| 25 | (Japan) Yukio Kagayama | Suzuki | Suzuki Grand Prix Team | | | | | | | Ret | 12 | | | | | | | | | 4 |
| 26 | (Australia) Andrew Pitt | Kawasaki | Kawasaki Racing Team | 17 | 16 | 15 | Ret | 16 | Ret | 14 | 17 | 19 | 16 | 21 | 18 | 16 | 16 | 15 | 18 | 4 |
| | (Japan) Tamaki Serizawa | MD211VF Proto | Moriwaki Racing WCM | 19 | | | | | | | | | | | | | | | | 0 |
| | (Japan) Tamaki Serizawa | Moriwaki | Moriwaki Racing | | | | | | | | | | | | | 18 | | | | 0 |
| | (Japan) Akira Yanagawa | Kawasaki | Kawasaki Racing Team | 18 | | | | | Ret | | | | | | | | | | | 0 |
| | (Spain) José David de Gea | Sabre V4 | WCM | | | | | | | | Ret | 20 | DNS | | | | | | | 0 |
| | (Spain) José David de Gea | Harris WCM | WCM | | | | | | | | | | | 22 | 19 | 19 | Ret | Ret | 20 | 0 |
| | (United Kingdom) Chris Burns | Harris WCM | WCM | DNS | | | | | | | | | | DNS | Ret | Ret | Ret | 20 | WD | 0 |
| | (United Kingdom) Chris Burns | ROC Yamaha | WCM | | | | | | | | Ret | WD | Ret | | | | | | | 0 |
| | (Japan) Daijiro Kato^{†} | Honda | Telefónica Movistar Honda | Ret^{†} | | | | | | | | | | | | | | | | 0 |
| Pos | Rider | Bike | Team | JPN (Japan) | RSA (South Africa) | SPA (Spain) | FRA (France) | ITA (Italy) | CAT (Catalonia) | NED (Netherlands) | GBR (United Kingdom) | GER (Germany) | CZE (Czech Republic) | POR (Portugal) | RIO (Rio de Janeiro (state)) | PAC (Tochigi Prefecture) | MAL (Malaysia) | AUS (Australia) | VAL (Valencian Community) | Pts |

| Colour | Result |
|---|---|
| Gold | Winner |
| Silver | Second place |
| Bronze | Third place |
| Green | Points classification |
| Blue | Non-points classification |
| Blue | Non-classified finish (NC) |
| Purple | Retired, not classified (Ret) |
| Red | Did not qualify (DNQ) |
| Red | Did not pre-qualify (DNPQ) |
| Black | Disqualified (DSQ) |
| White | Did not start (DNS) |
| White | Withdrew (WD) |
| White | Race cancelled (C) |
| Blank | Did not practice (DNP) |
| Blank | Did not arrive (DNA) |
| Blank | Excluded (EX) |

**Bold** – Pole position
Italics – Fastest lap

- † – Daijiro Kato was fatally injured in an accident during the Japanese Grand Prix.

==== Constructors' standings ====
- Each constructor got the same number of points as their best placed rider in each race.
- Rounds marked with a light blue background were under wet race conditions or stopped by rain.

| Pos | Constructor | JPN (Japan) | RSA (South Africa) | SPA (Spain) | FRA (France) | ITA (Italy) | CAT (Catalonia) | NED (Netherlands) | GBR (United Kingdom) | GER (Germany) | CZE (Czech Republic) | POR (Portugal) | RIO (Rio de Janeiro (state)) | PAC (Tochigi Prefecture) | MAL (Malaysia) | AUS (Australia) | VAL (Valencian Community) | Pts |
|---|---|---|---|---|---|---|---|---|---|---|---|---|---|---|---|---|---|---|
| 1 | (Japan) Honda | 1 | 1 | 1 | 1 | 1 | 2 | 1 | 1 | 1 | 1 | 1 | 1 | 1 | 1 | 1 | 1 | 395 |
| 2 | (Italy) Ducati | 3 | 4 | 3 | Ret | 2 | 1 | 6 | 4 | 3 | 3 | 3 | 6 | 8 | 6 | 2 | 3 | 248 |
| 3 | (Japan) Yamaha | 8 | 5 | 5 | 3 | 5 | 4 | 4 | 6 | 7 | 4 | 7 | 8 | 5 | 5 | 6 | 5 | 175 |
| 4 | (Italy) Aprilia | 6 | Ret | 11 | 8 | 9 | 12 | 7 | 7 | 14 | 12 | 14 | 13 | 12 | 12 | 14 | 8 | 81 |
| 5 | (Japan) Suzuki | 13 | 13 | 7 | 16 | Ret | 15 | 15 | 11 | 15 | 17 | 17 | 17 | 10 | 14 | 9 | 11 | 43 |
| 6 | (Malaysia) / (United States) Proton KR | Ret | 12 | 9 | 6 | Ret | 16 | Ret | 15 | 11 | Ret | 19 | 16 | 14 | 17 | 11 | 12 | 38 |
| 7 | (Japan) Kawasaki | 16 | 16 | 15 | 9 | 14 | 17 | 10 | 16 | 16 | 16 | 21 | 18 | 16 | 16 | 13 | 18 | 19 |
| Pos | Constructor | JPN (Japan) | RSA (South Africa) | SPA (Spain) | FRA (France) | ITA (Italy) | CAT (Catalonia) | NED (Netherlands) | GBR (United Kingdom) | GER (Germany) | CZE (Czech Republic) | POR (Portugal) | RIO (Rio de Janeiro (state)) | PAC (Tochigi Prefecture) | MAL (Malaysia) | AUS (Australia) | VAL (Valencian Community) | Pts |

==== Teams' standings ====
- Each team got the total points scored by their two riders, including replacement riders. In one rider team, only the points scored by that rider was counted. Wildcard riders did not score points.
- Rounds marked with a light blue background were under wet race conditions or stopped by rain.

| Pos | Team | Bike No. | JPN (Japan) | RSA (South Africa) | SPA (Spain) | FRA (France) | ITA (Italy) | CAT (Catalonia) | NED (Netherlands) | GBR (United Kingdom) | GER (Germany) | CZE (Czech Republic) | POR (Portugal) | RIO (Rio de Janeiro (state)) | PAC (Tochigi Prefecture) | MAL (Malaysia) | AUS (Australia) | VAL (Valencian Community) | Pts |
|---|---|---|---|---|---|---|---|---|---|---|---|---|---|---|---|---|---|---|---|
| 1 | (Japan) Repsol Honda | 46 | **1** | 2 | 1 | **2** | **1** | **2** | 3 | 3 | 2 | **1** | 1 | **1** | 2 | **1** | **1** | **1** | 487 |
| 1 | (Japan) Repsol Honda | 69 | 7 | 7 | Ret | 12 | 12 | 9 | 11 | 8 | 5 | 6 | 9 | 5 | 3 | 4 | 3 | 16 | 487 |
| 2 | (Spain) Camel Pramac Pons | 3 | 2 | 3 | 2 | 5 | 3 | 14 | 2 | **1** | **Ret** | 5 | 2 | 4 | **1** | 3 | 17 | 4 | 351 |
| 2 | (Spain) Camel Pramac Pons | 11 | 20 | 6 | 4 | 7 | 6 | 6 | 12 | Ret | 6 | 8 | 5 | 7 | 7 | 7 | 5 | Ret | 351 |
| 3 | (Italy) Ducati Marlboro Team | 12 | 5 | 4 | 3 | Ret | Ret | 10 | 9 | 5 | 3 | 3 | 6 | 10 | Ret | 9 | Ret | 7 | 305 |
| 3 | (Italy) Ducati Marlboro Team | 65 | 3 | Ret | **Ret** | Ret | 2 | 1 | **6** | 4 | 4 | Ret | **3** | 6 | 8 | 6 | 2 | 3 | 305 |
| 4 | (Italy) Telefónica Movistar Honda | 15 | 4 | **1** | Ret | 1 | 7 | 3 | 1 | 2 | 1 | 2 | 4 | 2 | 4 | 2 | 4 | 2 | 299 |
| 4 | (Italy) Telefónica Movistar Honda | 23 | | | | 13 | 13 | 11 | 17 | 14 | 18 | 15 | 16 | 15 | 11 | 21 | 19 | 14 | 299 |
| 4 | (Italy) Telefónica Movistar Honda | 74 | Ret^{†} | | | | | | | | | | | | | | | | 299 |
| 5 | (Japan) Fortuna Yamaha Team | 7 | 10 | 9 | Ret | Ret | 8 | 4 | 4 | 6 | 8 | 4 | 8 | 9 | Ret | 5 | 8 | 5 | 188 |
| 5 | (Japan) Fortuna Yamaha Team | 17 | 11 | 8 | | | | | | | | | | | | | | 9 | 188 |
| 5 | (Japan) Fortuna Yamaha Team | 33 | WD | | 17 | 15 | 11 | 13 | Ret | Ret | Ret | 10 | 7 | 11 | 5 | 11 | Ret | | 188 |
| 6 | (France) Gauloises Yamaha Team | 4 | 8 | 5 | 5 | 3 | Ret | 8 | 8 | DNS | Ret | 7 | 11 | 12 | 6 | 15 | Ret | 6 | 172 |
| 6 | (France) Gauloises Yamaha Team | 19 | 15 | 10 | 10 | 4 | 10 | Ret | 5 | Ret | 9 | 11 | 13 | Ret | 13 | Ret | 6 | Ret | 172 |
| 7 | (Italy) Alice Aprilia Racing | 41 | 12 | Ret | 11 | 8 | Ret | 12 | Ret | 7 | Ret | 13 | 15 | 14 | 12 | 12 | 14 | 15 | 109 |
| 7 | (Italy) Alice Aprilia Racing | 45 | 6 | Ret | 14 | 10 | 9 | Ret | 7 | 10 | 14 | 12 | 14 | 13 | 17 | 13 | 16 | 8 | 109 |
| 8 | (Spain) d'Antín Yamaha Team | 56 | 9 | 11 | 8 | 14 | 5 | 5 | 13 | 9 | 7 | 14 | 12 | 8 | 9 | 8 | 7 | Ret | 101 |
| 9 | (Italy) Pramac Honda | 6 | Ret | 14 | 6 | Ret | 4 | 7 | 16 | 13 | 13 | 9 | 10 | 3 | DSQ | 10 | 10 | 10 | 87 |
| 10 | (Japan) Suzuki Grand Prix Team | 10 | 14 | 15 | 13 | 16 | Ret | | | | 15 | 20 | 17 | 17 | 15 | 14 | 9 | 11 | 55 |
| 10 | (Japan) Suzuki Grand Prix Team | 21 | 13 | 13 | 7 | Ret | Ret | 15 | 15 | 11 | Ret | 17 | 18 | DNS | Ret | | 12 | 13 | 55 |
| 10 | (Japan) Suzuki Grand Prix Team | 43 | | | | | | | | | | | | | | 20 | | | 55 |
| 10 | (Japan) Suzuki Grand Prix Team | 71 | | | | | | | Ret | 12 | | | | | | | | | 55 |
| 11 | (Malaysia) / (United States) Proton Team KR | 9 | Ret | 12 | 9 | Ret | Ret | 16 | Ret | 15 | 11 | Ret | 20 | Ret | 14 | 18 | 18 | 17 | 46 |
| 11 | (Malaysia) / (United States) Proton Team KR | 99 | Ret | Ret | 12 | 6 | Ret | Ret | Ret | Ret | 12 | Ret | 19 | 16 | Ret | 17 | 11 | 12 | 46 |
| 12 | (Japan) Kawasaki Racing Team | 8 | 16 | 17 | 18 | 9 | 15 | 17 | 18 | 16 | 16 | 18 | Ret | Ret | Ret | 19 | 13 | 19 | 15 |
| 12 | (Japan) Kawasaki Racing Team | 88 | 17 | 16 | 15 | Ret | 16 | Ret | 14 | 17 | 19 | 16 | 21 | 18 | 16 | 16 | 15 | 18 | 15 |
| | (United Kingdom) WCM | 35 | DNS | | | | | | | | | | DNS | Ret | Ret | Ret | 20 | WD | 0 |
| | (United Kingdom) WCM | 35 | | | | | | | | Ret | WD | Ret | | | | | | | 0 |
| | (United Kingdom) WCM | 52 | | | | | | | | Ret | 20 | DNS | | | | | | | 0 |
| | (United Kingdom) WCM | 52 | | | | | | | | | | | 22 | 19 | 19 | Ret | Ret | 20 | 0 |
| Pos | Team | Bike No. | JPN (Japan) | RSA (South Africa) | SPA (Spain) | FRA (France) | ITA (Italy) | CAT (Catalonia) | NED (Netherlands) | GBR (United Kingdom) | GER (Germany) | CZE (Czech Republic) | POR (Portugal) | RIO (Rio de Janeiro (state)) | PAC (Tochigi Prefecture) | MAL (Malaysia) | AUS (Australia) | VAL (Valencian Community) | Pts |

- † – #74 Daijiro Kato was fatally injured in an accident during the Japanese Grand Prix.

=== 250cc standings ===
Scoring system

Points were awarded to the top fifteen finishers. A rider had to finish the race to earn points.

| Position | **1st** | **2nd** | **3rd** | **4th** | **5th** | **6th** | **7th** | **8th** | **9th** | **10th** | **11th** | **12th** | **13th** | **14th** | **15th** |
| Points | 25 | 20 | 16 | 13 | 11 | 10 | 9 | 8 | 7 | 6 | 5 | 4 | 3 | 2 | 1 |

==== Riders' standings ====
- Rounds marked with a light blue background were under wet race conditions or stopped by rain.
- Riders marked with light blue background were eligible for Rookie of the Year awards.

| Pos | Rider | Bike | JPN (Japan) | RSA (South Africa) | SPA (Spain) | FRA (France) | ITA (Italy) | CAT (Catalonia) | NED (Netherlands) | GBR (United Kingdom) | GER (Germany) | CZE (Czech Republic) | POR (Portugal) | RIO (Rio de Janeiro (state)) | PAC (Tochigi Prefecture) | MAL (Malaysia) | AUS (Australia) | VAL (Valencian Community) | Pts |
|---|---|---|---|---|---|---|---|---|---|---|---|---|---|---|---|---|---|---|---|
| 1 | (San Marino) Manuel Poggiali | Aprilia | 1 | 1 | 4 | **Ret** | 1 | Ret | **4** | 2 | 8 | **3** | 2 | 1 | 3 | 2 | 9 | 3 | 249 |
| 2 | (Italy) Roberto Rolfo | Honda | 7 | 5 | 2 | 3 | 4 | 9 | 6 | 5 | 1 | 4 | 4 | 2 | 2 | 4 | 1 | 7 | 235 |
| 3 | (Spain) Toni Elías | Aprilia | Ret | 8 | 1 | 1 | 6 | 4 | 13 | 4 | 7 | 2 | **1** | **18** | **1** | **1** | **11** | 2 | 226 |
| 4 | (France) Randy de Puniet | Aprilia | Ret | **2** | **3** | 2 | **Ret** | **1** | Ret | 8 | 3 | 1 | 3 | 3 | 6 | 5 | Ret | **1** | 208 |
| 5 | (Spain) Fonsi Nieto | Aprilia | 6 | 7 | 7 | 4 | 2 | 2 | Ret | **1** | 2 | 6 | 9 | Ret | 8 | 3 | 3 | 5 | 194 |
| 6 | (Italy) Franco Battaini | Aprilia | 5 | 3 | 11 | 18 | 3 | 6 | 2 | 7 | 5 | 7 | 6 | Ret | Ret | 6 | 4 | 8 | 148 |
| 7 | (Australia) Anthony West | Aprilia | Ret | 6 | 5 | 7 | 9 | 3 | 1 | 3 | 6 | Ret | 10 | 8 | Ret | 9 | 2 | Ret | 145 |
| 8 | (Argentina) Sebastián Porto | Honda | 4 | 4 | 6 | Ret | 8 | 7 | 5 | 6 | **4** | 5 | 5 | Ret | Ret | 8 | Ret | 6 | 127 |
| 9 | (Japan) Naoki Matsudo | Yamaha | 8 | 10 | 8 | 5 | 7 | 5 | Ret | 9 | Ret | 9 | 8 | 5 | 7 | 7 | 6 | 11 | 119 |
| 10 | (France) Sylvain Guintoli | Aprilia | 10 | 9 | Ret | 6 | 5 | 8 | 3 | Ret | Ret | 8 | 7 | 4 | Ret | DNS | Ret | 4 | 101 |
| 11 | (Spain) Alex Debón | Honda | 11 | DSQ | 9 | 8 | 12 | 11 | 11 | 10 | 9 | DNS | 11 | 11 | 9 | Ret | 5 | 10 | 81 |
| 12 | (Spain) Joan Olivé | Aprilia | 13 | Ret | 10 | 10 | 10 | 10 | 23 | Ret | 17 | 16 | Ret | 7 | 19 | 14 | 18 | Ret | 38 |
| 13 | (Spain) Héctor Faubel | Aprilia | Ret | 11 | Ret | 11 | 15 | Ret | 17 | 12 | Ret | 10 | 13 | 6 | Ret | Ret | 16 | Ret | 34 |
| 14 | (United Kingdom) Chaz Davies | Aprilia | 18 | 15 | 18 | Ret | 13 | Ret | 24 | 13 | 12 | 14 | 20 | 9 | 11 | 20 | 15 | 13 | 33 |
| 15 | (Japan) Hiroshi Aoyama | Honda | **2** | | | | | | | | | | | | 5 | | | | 31 |
| 16 | (France) Erwan Nigon | Aprilia | 12 | 17 | Ret | 17 | 17 | 14 | 7 | Ret | 14 | Ret | 16 | 12 | 17 | Ret | 7 | Ret | 30 |
| 17 | (Italy) Alex Baldolini | Aprilia | Ret | 12 | 12 | 13 | Ret | Ret | 14 | 17 | 10 | Ret | 14 | Ret | 13 | 10 | Ret | Ret | 30 |
| 18 | (Japan) Yuki Takahashi | Honda | 3 | | | | | | | | | | | | 4 | | | | 29 |
| 19 | (France) Eric Bataille | Honda | 16 | 13 | 13 | 15 | DNS | Ret | Ret | Ret | Ret | 12 | 12 | 10 | Ret | Ret | Ret | 9 | 28 |
| 20 | (Sweden) Johan Stigefelt | Aprilia | 14 | 14 | Ret | 12 | Ret | 13 | 10 | Ret | Ret | Ret | DNS | 13 | Ret | Ret | 10 | 17 | 26 |
| 21 | (Germany) Dirk Heidolf | Aprilia | Ret | Ret | 15 | Ret | | | | 15 | 11 | 13 | 17 | 14 | 14 | 11 | 13 | 12 | 26 |
| 22 | (Germany) Christian Gemmel | Honda | Ret | 18 | 14 | 9 | 16 | 15 | 8 | Ret | Ret | 15 | 15 | 16 | 12 | 16 | Ret | Ret | 24 |
| 23 | (France) Hugo Marchand | Aprilia | Ret | Ret | Ret | 14 | 11 | Ret | 9 | 16 | Ret | 11 | Ret | Ret | 16 | 13 | 14 | Ret | 24 |
| 24 | (Czech Republic) Jakub Smrž | Honda | 15 | Ret | 17 | 19 | 14 | Ret | 12 | 14 | 13 | Ret | Ret | | 18 | | | 14 | 14 |
| 25 | (Czech Republic) Jaroslav Huleš | Yamaha | 17 | 16 | 16 | 16 | DNS | | | | | | | | | | | | 10 |
| 25 | (Czech Republic) Jaroslav Huleš | Honda | | | | | | | | | | | | 15 | Ret | 15 | 8 | Ret | 10 |
| 26 | (Japan) Tekkyu Kayo | Yamaha | 9 | | | | | | | | | | | | | | | | 7 |
| 27 | (Japan) Choujun Kameya | Honda | | | | | | | | | | | | | 10 | | | | 6 |
| 28 | (United Kingdom) Jay Vincent | Aprilia | | | | | | | | 11 | | | | | | | | | 5 |
| 29 | (Germany) Klaus Nöhles | Aprilia | | | | | | 12 | 15 | | | | | | | | | | 5 |
| 30 | (Czech Republic) Lukáš Pešek | Yamaha | | | | | | 16 | | | 16 | 17 | Ret | 17 | Ret | Ret | 12 | 19 | 4 |
| 31 | (Germany) Max Neukirchner | Honda | | | | | | | | | 15 | | | | | | | | 1 |
| 32 | (Japan) Masaki Tokudome | Yamaha | | | | | | | | | | | | | 15 | | | | 1 |
| 33 | (Czech Republic) Radomil Rous | Aprilia | | | | | | | | | | Ret | | | | | | 15 | 1 |
| | (Netherlands) Henk van de Lagemaat | Honda | 19 | 19 | 20 | 20 | 18 | 18 | 16 | 18 | Ret | Ret | 23 | 19 | 20 | 18 | 17 | 18 | 0 |
| | (Spain) Álvaro Molina | Aprilia | | | 19 | | | DNS | | | | | 19 | | | | | 16 | 0 |
| | (Germany) Katja Poensgen | Honda | 20 | Ret | DNQ | DNQ | DNQ | 17 | 18 | 19 | 18 | 20 | Ret | DNS | | 17 | Ret | | 0 |
| | (Finland) Vesa Kallio | Yamaha | | | | | | | | | 19 | 18 | 18 | | | | | | 0 |
| | (Italy) Christian Pistoni | Aprilia | | | | | 19 | | | | | | | | | | | | 0 |
| | (Italy) Christian Pistoni | Yamaha | | | | | | | 20 | | | | | | | | | | 0 |
| | (Netherlands) Jan Blok | Honda | | | | | | | 19 | | | | | | | | | | 0 |
| | (Czech Republic) Michal Filla | Yamaha | | | | | | | | | | 19 | | | | | | | 0 |
| | (China) Shi Zhao Huang | Yamaha | | | | | | | | | | | | | | 19 | | | 0 |
| | (Netherlands) Patrick Lakerveld | Aprilia | | | | | | | | | | | | | | | | 20 | 0 |
| | (Netherlands) Arie Vos | Yamaha | | | | | | | 21 | | | 21 | | | | | | | 0 |
| | (Spain) Luis Castro | Yamaha | | | 21 | | | | | | | | | | | | | | 0 |
| | (Sweden) Frederik Watz | Yamaha | | | | | | | | | | | 21 | | | | | | 0 |
| | (Netherlands) Hans Smees | Honda | | | | | | | 22 | | | | | | | | | | 0 |
| | (Hungary) Gábor Rizmayer | Honda | | | | | | | | | | 22 | | | | | | | 0 |
| | (Portugal) Miguel Praia | Yamaha | | | | | | | | | | | 22 | | | | | | 0 |
| | (Japan) Tomoyoshi Koyama | Yamaha | Ret | | | | | | | | | | | | Ret | | | | 0 |
| | (Japan) Katsuyuki Nakasuga | Yamaha | Ret | | | | | | | | | | | | | | | | 0 |
| | (France) Samuel Aubry | Honda | | | | Ret | | | | | | | | | | | | | 0 |
| | (France) Christophe Rastel | Honda | | | | | | Ret | | | | | | | | | | | 0 |
| | (United Kingdom) Lee Dickinson | Yamaha | | | | | | | | Ret | | | | | | | | | 0 |
| | (United Kingdom) Phillip Desborough | Yamaha | | | | | | | | Ret | | | | | | | | | 0 |
| | (Sweden) Tomas Palander | Honda | | | | | | | | | Ret | | | | | | | | 0 |
| | (Germany) Norman Rank | Honda | | | | | | | | | Ret | | | | | | | | 0 |
| | (Australia) Geoff Hardcastle | Yamaha | | | | | | | | | | | | | | | Ret | | 0 |
| | (France) Grégory Leblanc | Honda | | | DNS | | | | | | | | | | | | | DNQ | 0 |
| | (France) Vincent Eisen | Honda | | | | DNQ | | | | | | | | | | | | | 0 |
| | (Netherlands) Randy Gevers | Honda | | | | | | | DNQ | | | | | | | | | | 0 |
| | (United Kingdom) Andrew Sawford | Honda | | | | | | | | DNQ | | | | | | | | | 0 |
| | (Germany) Nico Kehrer | Honda | | | | | | | | | DNQ | | | | | | | | 0 |
| | (China) Zi Xian He | Yamaha | | | | | | | | | | | | | | DNQ | | | 0 |
| | (Australia) Mark Rowling | Yamaha | | | | | | | | | | | | | | | DNQ | | 0 |
| | (Australia) Peter Taplin | Honda | | | | | | | | | | | | | | | DNQ | | 0 |
| | (Australia) Rodney Camm | Honda | | | | | | | | | | | | | | | DNQ | | 0 |
| | (Australia) Brett Underwood | Yamaha | | | | | | | | | | | | | | | DNQ | | 0 |
| | (Austria) Yves Polzer | Honda | | | | | | | | | | | | | | | | DNQ | 0 |
| Pos | Rider | Bike | JPN (Japan) | RSA (South Africa) | SPA (Spain) | FRA (France) | ITA (Italy) | CAT (Catalonia) | NED (Netherlands) | GBR (United Kingdom) | GER (Germany) | CZE (Czech Republic) | POR (Portugal) | RIO (Rio de Janeiro (state)) | PAC (Tochigi Prefecture) | MAL (Malaysia) | AUS (Australia) | VAL (Valencian Community) | Pts |

| Colour | Result |
|---|---|
| Gold | Winner |
| Silver | Second place |
| Bronze | Third place |
| Green | Points classification |
| Blue | Non-points classification |
| Blue | Non-classified finish (NC) |
| Purple | Retired, not classified (Ret) |
| Red | Did not qualify (DNQ) |
| Red | Did not pre-qualify (DNPQ) |
| Black | Disqualified (DSQ) |
| White | Did not start (DNS) |
| White | Withdrew (WD) |
| White | Race cancelled (C) |
| Blank | Did not practice (DNP) |
| Blank | Did not arrive (DNA) |
| Blank | Excluded (EX) |

**Bold** – Pole position
Italics – Fastest lap

==== Constructors' standings ====
- Each constructor got the same number of points as their best placed rider in each race.
- Rounds marked with a light blue background were under wet race conditions or stopped by rain.

| Pos | Constructor | JPN (Japan) | RSA (South Africa) | SPA (Spain) | FRA (France) | ITA (Italy) | CAT (Catalonia) | NED (Netherlands) | GBR (United Kingdom) | GER (Germany) | CZE (Czech Republic) | POR (Portugal) | RIO (Rio de Janeiro (state)) | PAC (Tochigi Prefecture) | MAL (Malaysia) | AUS (Australia) | VAL (Valencian Community) | Pts |
|---|---|---|---|---|---|---|---|---|---|---|---|---|---|---|---|---|---|---|
| 1 | (Italy) Aprilia | 1 | 1 | 1 | 1 | 1 | 1 | 1 | 1 | 2 | 1 | 1 | 1 | 1 | 1 | 2 | 1 | 390 |
| 2 | (Japan) Honda | 2 | 4 | 2 | 3 | 4 | 7 | 5 | 5 | 1 | 4 | 4 | 2 | 2 | 4 | 1 | 6 | 252 |
| 3 | (Japan) Yamaha | 8 | 10 | 8 | 5 | 7 | 5 | 20 | 9 | 16 | 9 | 8 | 5 | 7 | 7 | 6 | 11 | 119 |
| Pos | Constructor | JPN (Japan) | RSA (South Africa) | SPA (Spain) | FRA (France) | ITA (Italy) | CAT (Catalonia) | NED (Netherlands) | GBR (United Kingdom) | GER (Germany) | CZE (Czech Republic) | POR (Portugal) | RIO (Rio de Janeiro (state)) | PAC (Tochigi Prefecture) | MAL (Malaysia) | AUS (Australia) | VAL (Valencian Community) | Pts |

=== 125cc standings ===
Scoring system

Points were awarded to the top fifteen finishers. A rider had to finish the race to earn points.

| Position | **1st** | **2nd** | **3rd** | **4th** | **5th** | **6th** | **7th** | **8th** | **9th** | **10th** | **11th** | **12th** | **13th** | **14th** | **15th** |
| Points | 25 | 20 | 16 | 13 | 11 | 10 | 9 | 8 | 7 | 6 | 5 | 4 | 3 | 2 | 1 |

==== Riders' standings ====
- Rounds marked with a light blue background were under wet race conditions or stopped by rain.
- Riders marked with light blue background were eligible for Rookie of the Year awards.

| Pos | Rider | Bike | JPN (Japan) | RSA (South Africa) | SPA (Spain) | FRA (France) | ITA (Italy) | CAT (Catalonia) | NED (Netherlands) | GBR (United Kingdom) | GER (Germany) | CZE (Czech Republic) | POR (Portugal) | RIO (Rio de Janeiro (state)) | PAC (Tochigi Prefecture) | MAL (Malaysia) | AUS (Australia) | VAL (Valencian Community) | Pts |
|---|---|---|---|---|---|---|---|---|---|---|---|---|---|---|---|---|---|---|---|
| 1 | (Spain) Daniel Pedrosa | Honda | 8 | 1 | 4 | 1 | 2 | 1 | **8** | Ret | 4 | 1 | 4 | **4** | **6** | 1 | WD | | 223 |
| 2 | (San Marino) Alex de Angelis | Aprilia | **Ret** | 6 | 3 | Ret | 5 | 3 | 6 | 4 | 3 | **3** | **3** | 3 | 9 | 6 | 7 | **Ret** | 166 |
| 3 | (Spain) Héctor Barberá | Aprilia | Ret | 13 | 7 | 11 | 9 | Ret | 3 | 1 | 14 | 5 | 2 | 9 | 1 | 8 | 6 | 3 | 164 |
| 4 | (Italy) Stefano Perugini | Aprilia | 1 | Ret | 5 | 7 | 7 | 5 | 5 | **3** | **1** | 2 | Ret | 7 | 4 | Ret | **Ret** | 13 | 162 |
| 5 | (Italy) Andrea Dovizioso | Honda | 5 | 2 | 9 | **3** | 4 | Ret | 10 | 2 | 7 | 6 | 8 | 6 | 3 | 13 | Ret | 8 | 157 |
| 6 | (Germany) Steve Jenkner | Aprilia | 3 | 3 | 2 | 8 | Ret | 4 | 1 | Ret | Ret | Ret | Ret | 10 | 5 | Ret | 3 | 2 | 151 |
| 7 | (Spain) Pablo Nieto | Aprilia | 7 | 5 | **Ret** | 5 | 3 | **17** | 2 | 6 | 5 | Ret | 1 | 5 | 8 | 9 | Ret | 7 | 148 |
| 8 | (Australia) Casey Stoner | Aprilia | Ret | 10 | 6 | 4 | **18** | Ret | Ret | 5 | 2 | DNS | DNS | 2 | 2 | Ret | Ret | 1 | 125 |
| 9 | (Italy) Lucio Cecchinello | Aprilia | 4 | 8 | 1 | 2 | 1 | Ret | 16 | 10 | 8 | Ret | Ret | 18 | Ret | Ret | Ret | 9 | 112 |
| 10 | (Italy) Mirko Giansanti | Aprilia | 2 | 15 | 10 | 12 | 11 | 12 | 15 | 11 | 11 | 7 | 10 | 14 | 11 | 7 | Ret | 5 | 93 |
| 11 | (Finland) Mika Kallio | Honda | 11 | 7 | 16 | Ret | 13 | 7 | 11 | 7 | 10 | | | | | | | | 88 |
| 11 | (Finland) Mika Kallio | KTM | | | | | | | | | | 4 | DSQ | 19 | 7 | 2 | Ret | Ret | 88 |
| 12 | (Spain) Jorge Lorenzo | Derbi | Ret | 24 | 15 | Ret | Ret | 6 | Ret | Ret | 21 | 12 | 6 | 1 | Ret | **3** | 8 | 11 | 79 |
| 13 | (Japan) Youichi Ui | Aprilia | 6 | **4** | 8 | 6 | 6 | Ret | 4 | Ret | Ret | 9 | | | | | | | 76 |
| 13 | (Japan) Youichi Ui | Gilera | | | | | | | | | | | DNS | 21 | 17 | 18 | 11 | Ret | 76 |
| 14 | (Hungary) Gábor Talmácsi | Aprilia | 14 | Ret | 19 | 16 | 16 | 9 | 9 | 9 | 6 | 11 | 7 | 8 | 14 | 14 | 9 | 12 | 70 |
| 15 | (Switzerland) Thomas Lüthi | Honda | 9 | 17 | 12 | 9 | 15 | 2 | 7 | 22 | Ret | Ret | Ret | 15 | 10 | 4 | 16 | DNS | 68 |
| 16 | (Japan) Masao Azuma | Honda | 17 | 9 | 11 | 10 | 14 | 22 | Ret | 13 | Ret | 13 | 13 | Ret | 13 | 5 | 2 | 15 | 64 |
| 17 | (Italy) Gino Borsoi | Aprilia | 10 | 11 | 13 | 13 | 8 | 8 | 13 | 19 | 17 | 8 | Ret | 12 | Ret | 20 | Ret | 10 | 54 |
| 18 | (France) Arnaud Vincent | KTM | Ret | 12 | 22 | Ret | 21 | 14 | Ret | 8 | Ret | | | | | | | | 39 |
| 18 | (France) Arnaud Vincent | Aprilia | | | | | | | | | | | 5 | 13 | 19 | 16 | 5 | Ret | 39 |
| 19 | (Italy) Simone Corsi | Honda | 12 | 14 | 21 | 14 | 12 | 15 | 12 | Ret | 9 | Ret | 9 | 22 | 15 | DNS | DNS | Ret | 32 |
| 20 | (Spain) Álvaro Bautista | Aprilia | 18 | 25 | 17 | Ret | 28 | 28 | Ret | 14 | Ret | 16 | 15 | 16 | 12 | 15 | 4 | 6 | 31 |
| 21 | (Italy) Marco Simoncelli | Aprilia | 21 | 20 | 14 | Ret | 17 | 16 | 20 | 16 | 12 | 14 | DNS | 11 | Ret | 11 | Ret | 4 | 31 |
| 22 | (Italy) Andrea Ballerini | Gilera | | | | | 19 | 18 | | | | | | | | | | | 25 |
| 22 | (Italy) Andrea Ballerini | Honda | | | | | | | | | | Ret | Ret | Ret | 20 | 19 | 1 | Ret | 25 |
| 23 | (Italy) Gioele Pellino | Aprilia | 15 | 16 | 20 | Ret | 10 | 11 | Ret | 12 | 13 | 10 | Ret | 26 | Ret | Ret | Ret | Ret | 25 |
| 24 | (Italy) Roberto Locatelli | KTM | 23 | 28 | Ret | 15 | 20 | 10 | Ret | Ret | 18 | 17 | 11 | 17 | Ret | 10 | Ret | 17 | 18 |
| 25 | (Italy) Fabrizio Lai | Malaguti | 16 | 18 | 23 | Ret | Ret | 19 | 14 | Ret | 15 | 18 | 12 | 24 | 18 | 17 | 13 | 18 | 10 |
| 26 | (Denmark) Robbin Harms | Aprilia | | | | | 25 | | DSQ | | 16 | 19 | Ret | 23 | 22 | 21 | 10 | 14 | 8 |
| 27 | (Italy) Stefano Bianco | Gilera | Ret | 21 | Ret | DNS | | | Ret | Ret | Ret | 20 | 14 | 20 | 16 | 12 | 15 | 21 | 7 |
| 28 | (France) Mike Di Meglio | Aprilia | 22 | 22 | 28 | 17 | Ret | 13 | 19 | 15 | Ret | 15 | | | | | | | 5 |
| 28 | (France) Mike Di Meglio | Honda | | | | | | | | | | | | Ret | Ret | 22 | Ret | Ret | 5 |
| 29 | (Spain) Julián Simón | Malaguti | 19 | 27 | Ret | 20 | Ret | 24 | 17 | 18 | 20 | 22 | Ret | 25 | 24 | 25 | 12 | 19 | 4 |
| 30 | (Italy) Max Sabbatani | Aprilia | 13 | Ret | 24 | 18 | 23 | 21 | 22 | Ret | DNS | Ret | 21 | Ret | Ret | Ret | Ret | 16 | 3 |
| 31 | (Spain) Emilio Alzamora | Derbi | Ret | 23 | 18 | 19 | Ret | Ret | 21 | Ret | Ret | 21 | 19 | Ret | Ret | 23 | 14 | 24 | 2 |
| | (Italy) Mattia Angeloni | Honda | | | | | 24 | | | | | | 16 | | | | | | 0 |
| | (Hungary) Imre Tóth | Honda | 24 | Ret | 26 | 23 | 27 | 20 | 23 | 17 | Ret | 23 | Ret | Ret | 26 | 24 | Ret | | 0 |
| | (Hungary) Imre Tóth | Aprilia | | | | | | | | | | | | | | | | 22 | 0 |
| | (Italy) Michele Danese | Honda | | | | | | | | | | | | 27 | Ret | 26 | 17 | Ret | 0 |
| | (Italy) Manuel Manna | Aprilia | | | | | | | | | | | 17 | | | | | | 0 |
| | (Spain) Sergio Gadea | Aprilia | | | 25 | | | 23 | | | | | 18 | | | | | 20 | 0 |
| | (Netherlands) Adri den Bekker | Honda | | | | | | | 18 | | | | | | | | | | 0 |
| | (Germany) Dario Giuseppetti | Honda | | | | | | | | | 19 | | | | | | | Ret | 0 |
| | (Spain) Ismael Ortega | Aprilia | | | 27 | | | WD | | 21 | | | 20 | | | | | 23 | 0 |
| | (Hungary) Péter Lénárt | Honda | Ret | 29 | Ret | 22 | 31 | 26 | Ret | 20 | 22 | Ret | Ret | | | | | | 0 |
| | (Japan) Toshika Kuzuhara | Honda | 20 | | | | | | | | | | | | Ret | | | | 0 |
| | (United Kingdom) Christopher Martin | Honda | 25 | 26 | Ret | 21 | Ret | Ret | | | | | | | | | | | 0 |
| | (Japan) Shuhei Aoyama | Honda | Ret | | | | | | | | | | | | 21 | | | | 0 |
| | (Italy) Michele Conti | Honda | | | | | 22 | | | | | | | | | | | | 0 |
| | (United Kingdom) Leon Camier | Honda | 26 | Ret | 30 | 24 | 30 | 27 | Ret | Ret | 23 | | | | | | | | 0 |
| | (United Kingdom) Paul Veazey | Honda | | | | | | | | 23 | | | | | | | | | 0 |
| | (Japan) Hiroaki Kuzuhara | Honda | | | | | | | | | | | | | 23 | | | | 0 |
| | (Netherlands) Jarno van der Marel | Honda | | | | | | | 24 | | | | | | | | | | 0 |
| | (United Kingdom) Midge Smart | Honda | | | | | | | | 24 | | | | | | | | | 0 |
| | (Czech Republic) Igor Kaláb | Honda | | | | | | | | | | 24 | | | | | | | 0 |
| | (Japan) Sadahito Suma | Honda | Ret | | | | | | | | | | | | 25 | | | | 0 |
| | (France) Jimmy Petit | Honda | | | | 25 | | | | | | | | | | | | | 0 |
| | (Spain) Jordi Carchano | Honda | | | | | | 25 | | | | | | | | | | | 0 |
| | (United Kingdom) Lee Longden | Honda | | | | | | | | 25 | | | | | | | | | 0 |
| | (Czech Republic) Markéta Janáková | Honda | | | | | | | | | | 25 | | | | | | | 0 |
| | (Italy) Alessio Aldrovandi | Malaguti | | | | | 26 | | | | | | | | | | | | 0 |
| | (United Kingdom) Chester Lusk | Honda | | | | | | | | 26 | | | | | | | | | 0 |
| | (Slovakia) Luka Nedog | Honda | | | | | | | | | | 26 | | | | | | | 0 |
| | (Japan) Akio Tanaka | Honda | 27 | | | | | | | | | | | | | | | | 0 |
| | (Spain) Rubén Catalán | Aprilia | | | 29 | | | | | | | | | | | | | | 0 |
| | (Italy) Michele Pirro | Aprilia | | | | | 29 | | | | | | | | | | | | 0 |
| | (Spain) David Bonache | Honda | | | Ret | | | Ret | | | | | Ret | | | | | DNS | 0 |
| | (France) William Gautier | Honda | | | | Ret | | | | | | | | | | | | | 0 |
| | (France) Gregory Lefort | Aprilia | | | | Ret | | | | | | | | | | | | | 0 |
| | (France) Xavier Herouin | Honda | | | | Ret | | | | | | | | | | | | | 0 |
| | (France) Alexis Masbou | Honda | | | | Ret | | | | | | | | | | | | | 0 |
| | (Netherlands) Raymond Schouten | Honda | | | | | | | Ret | | | | | | | | | | 0 |
| | (Netherlands) Mark van Kreij | Honda | | | | | | | Ret | | | | | | | | | | 0 |
| | (Germany) Patrick Unger | Honda | | | | | | | | | Ret | | | | | | | | 0 |
| | (Germany) Jarno Müller | Honda | | | | | | | | | Ret | | | | | | | | 0 |
| | (Germany) Jascha Büch | Honda | | | | | | | | | Ret | | | | | | | | 0 |
| | (Germany) Manuel Mickan | Honda | | | | | | | | | Ret | | | | | | | | 0 |
| | (Czech Republic) Václav Bittman | Honda | | | | | | | | | | Ret | | | | | | | 0 |
| | (Japan) Yuki Hatano | Honda | | | | | | | | | | | | | Ret | | | | 0 |
| | (Australia) Matthew Kuhne | Honda | | | | | | | | | | | | | | | Ret | | 0 |
| | (Australia) Joshua Waters | Honda | | | | | | | | | | | | | | | Ret | | 0 |
| | (China) Cheung Wai On | Honda | DNQ | | | | | | | | | | | | | | | | 0 |
| | (United Kingdom) Kris Weston | Honda | | | | | | | | DNS | | | | | | | | | 0 |
| | (Japan) Hiroyuki Kikuchi | Honda | | | | | | | | | | DNS | | | | | | | 0 |
| | (Australia) Brett Simmonds | Honda | | | | | | | | | | | | | | | DNQ | | 0 |
| | (Spain) Manuel Hernández | Aprilia | | | | | | | | | | | | | | | | DNS | 0 |
| Pos | Rider | Bike | JPN (Japan) | RSA (South Africa) | SPA (Spain) | FRA (France) | ITA (Italy) | CAT (Catalonia) | NED (Netherlands) | GBR (United Kingdom) | GER (Germany) | CZE (Czech Republic) | POR (Portugal) | RIO (Rio de Janeiro (state)) | PAC (Tochigi Prefecture) | MAL (Malaysia) | AUS (Australia) | VAL (Valencian Community) | Pts |

| Colour | Result |
|---|---|
| Gold | Winner |
| Silver | Second place |
| Bronze | Third place |
| Green | Points classification |
| Blue | Non-points classification |
| Blue | Non-classified finish (NC) |
| Purple | Retired, not classified (Ret) |
| Red | Did not qualify (DNQ) |
| Red | Did not pre-qualify (DNPQ) |
| Black | Disqualified (DSQ) |
| White | Did not start (DNS) |
| White | Withdrew (WD) |
| White | Race cancelled (C) |
| Blank | Did not practice (DNP) |
| Blank | Did not arrive (DNA) |
| Blank | Excluded (EX) |

**Bold** – Pole position
Italics – Fastest lap

==== Manufacturers' standings ====
- Each constructor got the same number of points as their best placed rider in each race.
- Rounds marked with a light blue background were under wet race conditions or stopped by rain.

| Pos | Constructor | JPN (Japan) | RSA (South Africa) | SPA (Spain) | FRA (France) | ITA (Italy) | CAT (Catalonia) | NED (Netherlands) | GBR (United Kingdom) | GER (Germany) | CZE (Czech Republic) | POR (Portugal) | RIO (Rio de Janeiro (state)) | PAC (Tochigi Prefecture) | MAL (Malaysia) | AUS (Australia) | VAL (Valencian Community) | Pts |
|---|---|---|---|---|---|---|---|---|---|---|---|---|---|---|---|---|---|---|
| 1 | (Italy) Aprilia | 1 | 3 | 1 | 2 | 1 | 3 | 1 | 1 | 1 | 2 | 1 | 2 | 1 | 6 | 3 | 1 | 343 |
| 2 | (Japan) Honda | 5 | 1 | 4 | 1 | 2 | 1 | 7 | 2 | 4 | 1 | 4 | 4 | 3 | 1 | 1 | 8 | 286 |
| 3 | (Spain) Derbi | Ret | 23 | 15 | 19 | Ret | 6 | 21 | Ret | 21 | 12 | 6 | 1 | Ret | 3 | 8 | 11 | 79 |
| 4 | (Austria) KTM | 23 | 12 | 22 | 15 | 20 | 10 | Ret | 8 | 18 | 4 | 11 | 17 | 7 | 2 | Ret | 17 | 66 |
| 5 | (Italy) Gilera | Ret | 21 | Ret | DNS | 19 | 18 | Ret | Ret | Ret | 20 | 14 | 20 | 16 | 12 | 11 | 21 | 11 |
| 6 | (Italy) Malaguti | 16 | 18 | 23 | 20 | 26 | 19 | 14 | 18 | 15 | 18 | 12 | 24 | 18 | 17 | 12 | 18 | 11 |
| Pos | Constructor | JPN (Japan) | RSA (South Africa) | SPA (Spain) | FRA (France) | ITA (Italy) | CAT (Catalonia) | NED (Netherlands) | GBR (United Kingdom) | GER (Germany) | CZE (Czech Republic) | POR (Portugal) | RIO (Rio de Janeiro (state)) | PAC (Tochigi Prefecture) | MAL (Malaysia) | AUS (Australia) | VAL (Valencian Community) | Pts |

== Sources ==
- "The Official MotoGP website". Archived from the original on 2022-01-23.
