= Stefano Bianco =

Italian motorcycle racer (1985–2020)

- Nationality: Italian
- Born: 27 October 1985; Chivasso, Italy
- Died: 11 March 2020 (aged 34); Leini, Italy
Motorcycle racing career statistics
250cc World Championship
Active years	2008
Manufacturers	Gilera, Aprilia
Championships	0
2008 championship position	NC (0 pts)
Starts / Wins / Podiums / Poles / F. laps / Points; 0 / 0 / 0 / 0 / 0 / 0
125cc World Championship
Active years	2000, 2002–2004, 2007–2008
Manufacturers	Honda, Aprilia, Gilera
Championships	0
2008 championship position	27th (8 pts)
Starts / Wins / Podiums / Poles / F. laps / Points; 53 / 0 / 0 / 0 / 1 / 46

Stefano Bianco (27 October 1985 – 11 March 2020) was an Italian motorcycle racer. At international level, he competed in the 125cc World Championship, the 250cc World Championship and the European Superstock 1000 Championship.

Bianco died on 11 March 2020, in a road traffic accident.

== Career statistics ==
2004 - 24th, Superstock European Championship, Suzuki GSX-R1000

=== Grand Prix motorcycle racing ===
==== By season ====
Season	Class	Motorcycle	Team	Race	Win	Podium	Pole	FLap	Pts	Plcd
2000	125cc	Honda	Benetton Playlife	1	0	0	0	0	0	NC
2002	125cc	Aprilia	Bossini Sterilgarda Racing	15	0	0	0	1	24	19th
2003	125cc	Gilera	Metis Gilera Racing	13	0	0	0	0	7	27th
2004	125cc	Aprilia	Gold Racing	1	0	0	0	0	0	NC
2007	125cc	Aprilia	WTR No Alcol Team	15	0	0	0	0	7	24th
2008	125cc	Aprilia	S3+ WTR San Marino Team	8	0	0	0	0	8	27th
2008	250cc	Gilera	Campetella Racing	0	0	0	0	0	0	NC
2008	250cc	Aprilia	Team Tóth Aprilia	0	0	0	0	0	0	NC
Total				**53**	**0**	**0**	**0**	**1**	**46**	

==== Races by year ====
(key) (Races in bold indicate pole position, races in italics indicate fastest lap)

Year	Class	Bike	1	2	3	4	5	6	7	8	9	10	11	12	13	14	15	16	17	Pos	Pts
2000	125cc	Honda	RSA	MAL	JPN	SPA	FRA	ITA	CAT	NED	GBR	GER	CZE	POR	VAL	BRA	PAC	AUS; 20		NC	0
2002	125cc	Aprilia	JPN; Ret	RSA; 22	SPA; 19	FRA; 7	ITA; Ret	CAT; 7	NED; 29	GBR; Ret	GER	CZE; 13	POR; Ret	BRA; 17	PAC; 17	MAL; Ret	AUS; Ret	VAL; 13		19th	24
2003	125cc	Gilera	JPN; Ret	RSA; 21	SPA; Ret	FRA; DNS	ITA	CAT	NED; Ret	GBR; Ret	GER; Ret	CZE; 20	POR; 14	BRA; 20	PAC; 16	MAL; 12	AUS; 15	VAL; 21		27th	7
2004	125cc	Aprilia	RSA	SPA	FRA	ITA; 18	CAT	NED	BRA	GER	GBR	CZE	POR	JPN	QAT	MAL	AUS	VAL		NC	0
2007	125cc	Aprilia	QAT; Ret	SPA; 11	TUR; 17	CHN; Ret	FRA; 17	ITA; Ret	CAT	GBR; Ret	NED; 19	GER; 16	CZE; 15	RSM; Ret	POR; 15	JPN; Ret	AUS	MAL; 16	VAL; 17	24th	7
2008	125cc	Aprilia	QAT; 13	SPA; Ret	POR; 17	CHN; DNS	FRA; Ret	ITA; Ret	CAT; 18	GBR; 20	NED; 11	GER	CZE	RSM						27th	8
2008	250cc	Gilera													INP; C	JPN				NC	0
2008	250cc	Aprilia															AUS; DNQ	MAL	VAL	NC	0

=== Superstock European Championship ===
==== Races by year ====
(key) (Races in bold indicate pole position) (Races in italics indicate fastest lap)

Year	Bike	1	2	3	4	5	6	7	8	9	Pos	Pts
2004	Suzuki	VAL; 8	SMR; WD	MNZ; 17	OSC; Ret	SIL	BRA; WD	NED	IMO	MAG	24th	8
