= 2003 Spanish motorcycle Grand Prix =

(Spain) 2003 Spanish Grand Prix
Race details
- Race 3 of 16 races in the 2003 Grand Prix motorcycle racing season
- Date: 11 May 2003
- Official name: Gran Premio Marlboro de España
- Location: Circuito de Jerez
- Course: Permanent racing facility; 4.423 km (2.748 mi)

MotoGP
Pole position
Rider	(Italy) Loris Capirossi	Ducati
Time	1:41.983	
Fastest lap
Rider	(Italy) Valentino Rossi	Honda
Time	1:42.788 on lap 5	
Podium
First	(Italy) Valentino Rossi	Honda
Second	(Italy) Max Biaggi	Honda
Third	(Australia) Troy Bayliss	Ducati

250cc
Pole position
Rider	(France) Randy de Puniet	Aprilia
Time	1:44.723	
Fastest lap
Rider	(San Marino) Manuel Poggiali	Aprilia
Time	1:45.350 on lap 2	
Podium
First	(Spain) Toni Elías	Aprilia
Second	(Italy) Roberto Rolfo	Honda
Third	(France) Randy de Puniet	Aprilia

125cc
Pole position
Rider	(Spain) Pablo Nieto	Aprilia
Time	1:47.711	
Fastest lap
Rider	(Italy) Stefano Perugini	Aprilia
Time	1:47.766 on lap 6	
Podium
First	(Italy) Lucio Cecchinello	Aprilia
Second	(Germany) Steve Jenkner	Aprilia
Third	(San Marino) Alex de Angelis	Aprilia

The 2003 Spanish motorcycle Grand Prix was the third round of the 2003 MotoGP Championship. It took place on the weekend of 9–11 May 2003 at the Circuito de Jerez.

== MotoGP classification ==
Pos.	No.	Rider	Team	Manufacturer	Laps	Time/Retired	Grid	Points
1	46	(Italy) Valentino Rossi	Repsol Honda	Honda	27	46:50.345	5	25
2	3	(Italy) Max Biaggi	Camel Pramac Pons	Honda	27	+6.333	3	20
3	12	(Australia) Troy Bayliss	Ducati Marlboro Team	Ducati	27	+12.077	2	16
4	11	(Japan) Tohru Ukawa	Camel Pramac Pons	Honda	27	+16.186	4	13
5	4	(Brazil) Alex Barros	Gauloises Yamaha Team	Yamaha	27	+18.630	15	11
6	6	(Japan) Makoto Tamada	Pramac Honda	Honda	27	+24.153	12	10
7	21	(United States) John Hopkins	Suzuki Grand Prix Team	Suzuki	27	+30.959	7	9
8	56	(Japan) Shinya Nakano	d'Antín Yamaha Team	Yamaha	27	+31.218	13	8
9	9	(Japan) Nobuatsu Aoki	Proton Team KR	Proton KR	27	+36.002	8	7
10	19	(France) Olivier Jacque	Gauloises Yamaha Team	Yamaha	27	+37.566	9	6
11	41	(Japan) Noriyuki Haga	Alice Aprilia Racing	Aprilia	27	+43.753	18	5
12	99	(United Kingdom) Jeremy McWilliams	Proton Team KR	Proton KR	27	+43.894	14	4
13	10	(United States) Kenny Roberts Jr.	Suzuki Grand Prix Team	Suzuki	27	+48.891	17	3
14	45	(United States) Colin Edwards	Alice Aprilia Racing	Aprilia	27	+52.128	11	2
15	88	(Australia) Andrew Pitt	Kawasaki Racing Team	Kawasaki	27	+1:08.179	20	1
16	66	(Germany) Alex Hofmann	Kawasaki Racing Team	Kawasaki	27	+1:08.372	21	
17	33	(Italy) Marco Melandri	Fortuna Yamaha Team	Yamaha	27	+1:31.010	16	
18	8	(Australia) Garry McCoy	Kawasaki Racing Team	Kawasaki	26	+1 lap	22	
Ret	65	(Italy) Loris Capirossi	Ducati Marlboro Team	Ducati	12	Accident	1	
Ret	69	(United States) Nicky Hayden	Repsol Honda	Honda	8	Accident	19	
Ret	15	(Spain) Sete Gibernau	Telefónica Movistar Honda	Honda	6	Accident	6	
Ret	7	(Spain) Carlos Checa	Fortuna Yamaha Team	Yamaha	3	Retirement	10	

== 250 cc classification ==
Pos.	No.	Rider	Manufacturer	Laps	Time/Retired	Grid	Points
1	24	(Spain) Toni Elías	Aprilia	26	46:10.793	6	25
2	3	(Italy) Roberto Rolfo	Honda	26	+0.521	4	20
3	7	(France) Randy de Puniet	Aprilia	26	+0.539	1	16
4	54	(San Marino) Manuel Poggiali	Aprilia	26	+0.607	2	13
5	14	(Australia) Anthony West	Aprilia	26	+12.048	7	11
6	5	(Argentina) Sebastián Porto	Honda	26	+14.204	8	10
7	10	(Spain) Fonsi Nieto	Aprilia	26	+22.463	5	9
8	8	(Japan) Naoki Matsudo	Yamaha	26	+37.840	10	8
9	6	(Spain) Alex Debón	Honda	26	+42.820	16	7
10	11	(Spain) Joan Olivé	Aprilia	26	+48.821	19	6
11	21	(Italy) Franco Battaini	Aprilia	26	+52.185	3	5
12	26	(Italy) Alex Baldolini	Aprilia	26	+54.704	23	4
13	34	(France) Eric Bataille	Honda	26	+56.089	11	3
14	15	(Germany) Christian Gemmel	Honda	26	+57.708	15	2
15	28	(Germany) Dirk Heidolf	Aprilia	26	+1:03.433	20	1
16	13	(Czech Republic) Jaroslav Huleš	Yamaha	26	+1:08.944	21	
17	96	(Czech Republic) Jakub Smrž	Honda	26	+1:18.200	22	
18	57	(United Kingdom) Chaz Davies	Aprilia	26	+1:18.401	18	
19	40	(Spain) Álvaro Molina	Aprilia	26	+1:25.198	24	
20	18	(Netherlands) Henk vd Lagemaat	Honda	25	+1 lap	25	
21	39	(Spain) Luis Castro	Yamaha	25	+1 lap	26	
Ret	16	(Sweden) Johan Stigefelt	Aprilia	22	Accident	12	
Ret	50	(France) Sylvain Guintoli	Aprilia	14	Accident	9	
Ret	9	(France) Hugo Marchand	Aprilia	14	Retirement	13	
Ret	33	(Spain) Héctor Faubel	Aprilia	5	Accident	17	
Ret	36	(France) Erwan Nigon	Aprilia	2	Retirement	14	
DNS	42	(France) Grégory Leblanc	Honda		Did not start		
DNQ	98	(Germany) Katja Poensgen	Honda		Did not qualify		

== 125 cc classification ==
Pos.	No.	Rider	Manufacturer	Laps	Time/Retired	Grid	Points
1	4	(Italy) Lucio Cecchinello	Aprilia	23	41:52.177	2	25
2	17	(Germany) Steve Jenkner	Aprilia	23	+0.088	5	20
3	15	(San Marino) Alex de Angelis	Aprilia	23	+0.378	3	16
4	3	(Spain) Daniel Pedrosa	Honda	23	+1.385	4	13
5	7	(Italy) Stefano Perugini	Aprilia	23	+1.507	12	11
6	27	(Australia) Casey Stoner	Aprilia	23	+11.402	11	10
7	80	(Spain) Héctor Barberá	Aprilia	23	+11.496	7	9
8	41	(Japan) Youichi Ui	Aprilia	23	+15.577	6	8
9	34	(Italy) Andrea Dovizioso	Honda	23	+18.604	8	7
10	6	(Italy) Mirko Giansanti	Aprilia	23	+18.897	9	6
11	8	(Japan) Masao Azuma	Honda	23	+23.532	17	5
12	12	(Switzerland) Thomas Lüthi	Honda	23	+23.600	20	4
13	23	(Italy) Gino Borsoi	Aprilia	23	+23.810	15	3
14	58	(Italy) Marco Simoncelli	Aprilia	23	+24.208	10	2
15	48	(Spain) Jorge Lorenzo	Derbi	23	+25.139	22	1
16	36	(Finland) Mika Kallio	Honda	23	+25.230	14	
17	19	(Spain) Álvaro Bautista	Aprilia	23	+27.742	16	
18	26	(Spain) Emilio Alzamora	Derbi	23	+28.511	23	
19	79	(Hungary) Gábor Talmácsi	Aprilia	23	+29.036	13	
20	42	(Italy) Gioele Pellino	Aprilia	23	+59.993	25	
21	24	(Italy) Simone Corsi	Honda	23	+1:02.499	21	
22	1	(France) Arnaud Vincent	KTM	23	+1:02.545	19	
23	32	(Italy) Fabrizio Lai	Malaguti	23	+1:02.841	26	
24	11	(Italy) Max Sabbatani	Aprilia	23	+1:03.046	18	
25	70	(Spain) Sergio Gadea	Aprilia	23	+1:11.364	33	
26	25	(Hungary) Imre Tóth	Honda	23	+1:11.453	28	
27	81	(Spain) Ismael Ortega	Aprilia	23	+1:11.693	31	
28	63	(France) Mike Di Meglio	Aprilia	23	+1:20.298	32	
29	71	(Spain) Rubén Catalán	Aprilia	23	+1:34.875	34	
30	21	(United Kingdom) Leon Camier	Honda	23	+1:34.935	36	
Ret	10	(Italy) Roberto Locatelli	KTM	12	Retirement	30	
Ret	22	(Spain) Pablo Nieto	Aprilia	9	Retirement	1	
Ret	33	(Italy) Stefano Bianco	Gilera	3	Accident	24	
Ret	14	(United Kingdom) Chris Martin	Aprilia	1	Accident	27	
Ret	69	(Spain) David Bonache	TSR	1	Retirement	35	
Ret	31	(Spain) Julián Simón	Malaguti	1	Accident	29	
Ret	78	(Hungary) Péter Lénárt	Honda	0	Retirement	37	

== Championship standings after the race (MotoGP) ==
Below are the standings for the top five riders and constructors after round three has concluded.

Riders' Championship standings

Pos.	Rider	Points
1	(Italy) Valentino Rossi	70
2	(Italy) Max Biaggi	56
3	(Australia) Troy Bayliss	40
4	(Spain) Sete Gibernau	38
5	(Brazil) Alex Barros	30

Constructors' Championship standings

Pos.	Constructor	Points
1	(Japan) Honda	75
2	(Italy) Ducati	45
3	(Japan) Yamaha	30
4	(Italy) Aprilia	15
5	(Japan) Suzuki	15

- Note: Only the top five positions are included for both sets of standings.

Previous race: 2003 South African Grand Prix	FIM Grand Prix World Championship; 2003 season	Next race: 2003 French Grand Prix
Previous race: 2002 Spanish Grand Prix	Spanish motorcycle Grand Prix	Next race: 2004 Spanish Grand Prix
