= 2003 French motorcycle Grand Prix =

(France) 2003 French Grand Prix
Race details
- Race 4 of 16 races in the 2003 Grand Prix motorcycle racing season
- Date: 25 May 2003
- Official name: Grand Prix Polini de France
- Location: Bugatti Circuit
- Course: Permanent racing facility; 4.180 km (2.597 mi)

MotoGP
Pole position
Rider	(Italy) Valentino Rossi	Honda
Time	1:35.208	
Fastest lap
Rider	(Japan) Noriyuki Haga	Aprilia
Time	1:36.688 on lap 9 (first part)	
Podium
First	(Spain) Sete Gibernau	Honda
Second	(Italy) Valentino Rossi	Honda
Third	(Brazil) Alex Barros	Yamaha

250cc
Pole position
Rider	(San Marino) Manuel Poggiali	Aprilia
Time	1:39.229	
Fastest lap
Rider	(France) Randy de Puniet	Aprilia
Time	1:40.356 on lap 9	
Podium
First	(Spain) Toni Elías	Aprilia
Second	(France) Randy de Puniet	Aprilia
Third	(Italy) Roberto Rolfo	Honda

125cc
Pole position
Rider	(Italy) Andrea Dovizioso	Honda
Time	1:43.565	
Fastest lap
Rider	(Spain) Daniel Pedrosa	Honda
Time	1:43.837 on lap 8	
Podium
First	(Spain) Daniel Pedrosa	Honda
Second	(Italy) Lucio Cecchinello	Aprilia
Third	(Italy) Andrea Dovizioso	Honda

The 2003 French motorcycle Grand Prix was the fourth round of the 2003 MotoGP Championship. It took place on the weekend of 23–25 May 2003 at the Bugatti Circuit located in Le Mans, France.

== MotoGP classification ==
The race was stopped after 15 laps due to rain. It was later restarted for 13 laps with the grid order determined by the running order after the suspension. The second part of the race determined the final result.

Pos.	No.	Rider	Team	Manufacturer	Laps	Time/Retired	Grid	Points
1	15	(Spain) Sete Gibernau	Telefónica Movistar Honda	Honda	13	24:29.665	7	25
2	46	(Italy) Valentino Rossi	Repsol Honda	Honda	13	+0.165	1	20
3	4	(Brazil) Alex Barros	Gauloises Yamaha Team	Yamaha	13	+1.793	2	16
4	19	(France) Olivier Jacque	Gauloises Yamaha Team	Yamaha	13	+29.912	16	13
5	3	(Italy) Max Biaggi	Camel Pramac Pons	Honda	13	+31.493	5	11
6	99	(United Kingdom) Jeremy McWilliams	Proton Team KR	Proton KR	13	+33.946	12	10
7	11	(Japan) Tohru Ukawa	Camel Pramac Pons	Honda	13	+35.447	8	9
8	41	(Japan) Noriyuki Haga	Alice Aprilia Racing	Aprilia	13	+36.231	18	8
9	8	(Australia) Garry McCoy	Kawasaki Racing Team	Kawasaki	13	+51.254	22	7
10	45	(United States) Colin Edwards	Alice Aprilia Racing	Aprilia	13	+1:01.802	19	6
11	17	(Japan) Norifumi Abe	Yamaha Racing Team	Yamaha	12	+1 lap	10	5
12	69	(United States) Nicky Hayden	Repsol Honda	Honda	12	+1 lap	13	4
13	23	(Japan) Ryuichi Kiyonari	Telefónica Movistar Honda	Honda	12	+1 lap	23	3
14	56	(Japan) Shinya Nakano	d'Antín Yamaha Team	Yamaha	11	+2 laps	9	2
15	33	(Italy) Marco Melandri	Fortuna Yamaha Team	Yamaha	11	+2 laps	4	1
16	10	(United States) Kenny Roberts Jr.	Suzuki Grand Prix Team	Suzuki	11	+2 laps	17	
Ret	88	(Australia) Andrew Pitt	Kawasaki Racing Team	Kawasaki	3	Accident	21	
Ret	21	(United States) John Hopkins	Suzuki Grand Prix Team	Suzuki	2	Accident	11	
Ret	6	(Japan) Makoto Tamada	Pramac Honda	Honda	1	Accident	15	
Ret	12	(Australia) Troy Bayliss	Ducati Marlboro Team	Ducati	0	Accident in 1st part	14	
Ret	65	(Italy) Loris Capirossi	Ducati Marlboro Team	Ducati	0	Retirement in 1st part	3	
Ret	7	(Spain) Carlos Checa	Fortuna Yamaha Team	Yamaha	0	Accident in 1st part	6	
Ret	9	(Japan) Nobuatsu Aoki	Proton Team KR	Proton KR	0	Retirement in 1st part	20	

== 250 cc classification ==
Pos.	No.	Rider	Manufacturer	Laps	Time/Retired	Grid	Points
1	24	(Spain) Toni Elías	Aprilia	26	43:55.538	5	25
2	7	(France) Randy de Puniet	Aprilia	26	+3.740	3	20
3	3	(Italy) Roberto Rolfo	Honda	26	+4.562	9	16
4	10	(Spain) Fonsi Nieto	Aprilia	26	+4.972	4	13
5	8	(Japan) Naoki Matsudo	Yamaha	26	+5.122	8	11
6	50	(France) Sylvain Guintoli	Aprilia	26	+6.100	7	10
7	14	(Australia) Anthony West	Aprilia	26	+29.672	10	9
8	6	(Spain) Alex Debón	Honda	26	+34.885	17	8
9	15	(Germany) Christian Gemmel	Honda	26	+35.013	22	7
10	11	(Spain) Joan Olivé	Aprilia	26	+35.559	13	6
11	33	(Spain) Héctor Faubel	Aprilia	26	+45.562	15	5
12	16	(Sweden) Johan Stigefelt	Aprilia	26	+54.955	14	4
13	26	(Italy) Alex Baldolini	Aprilia	26	+55.049	23	3
14	9	(France) Hugo Marchand	Aprilia	26	+55.794	12	2
15	34	(France) Eric Bataille	Honda	26	+56.183	18	1
16	13	(Czech Republic) Jaroslav Huleš	Yamaha	26	+57.386	21	
17	36	(France) Erwan Nigon	Aprilia	26	+1:27.351	11	
18	21	(Italy) Franco Battaini	Aprilia	26	+1:36.597	2	
19	96	(Czech Republic) Jakub Smrž	Honda	25	+1 lap	20	
20	18	(Netherlands) Henk vd Lagemaat	Honda	25	+1 lap	24	
Ret	57	(United Kingdom) Chaz Davies	Aprilia	22	Retirement	16	
Ret	28	(Germany) Dirk Heidolf	Aprilia	9	Retirement	19	
Ret	5	(Argentina) Sebastián Porto	Honda	5	Accident	6	
Ret	54	(San Marino) Manuel Poggiali	Aprilia	5	Accident	1	
Ret	45	(France) Samuel Aubry	Honda	2	Retirement	25	
DNQ	44	(France) Vincent Eisen	Honda		Did not qualify		
DNQ	98	(Germany) Katja Poensgen	Honda		Did not qualify		

== 125 cc classification ==
Pos.	No.	Rider	Manufacturer	Laps	Time/Retired	Grid	Points
1	3	(Spain) Daniel Pedrosa	Honda	24	41:58.500	6	25
2	4	(Italy) Lucio Cecchinello	Aprilia	24	+2.337	7	20
3	34	(Italy) Andrea Dovizioso	Honda	24	+2.427	1	16
4	27	(Australia) Casey Stoner	Aprilia	24	+11.278	4	13
5	22	(Spain) Pablo Nieto	Aprilia	24	+11.814	17	11
6	41	(Japan) Youichi Ui	Aprilia	24	+12.592	2	10
7	7	(Italy) Stefano Perugini	Aprilia	24	+18.930	15	9
8	17	(Germany) Steve Jenkner	Aprilia	24	+25.206	18	8
9	12	(Switzerland) Thomas Lüthi	Honda	24	+29.471	10	7
10	8	(Japan) Masao Azuma	Honda	24	+33.910	14	6
11	80	(Spain) Héctor Barberá	Aprilia	24	+44.379	9	5
12	6	(Italy) Mirko Giansanti	Aprilia	24	+44.537	11	4
13	23	(Italy) Gino Borsoi	Aprilia	24	+55.218	12	3
14	24	(Italy) Simone Corsi	Honda	24	+58.773	19	2
15	10	(Italy) Roberto Locatelli	KTM	24	+58.962	28	1
16	79	(Hungary) Gábor Talmácsi	Aprilia	24	+1:07.803	16	
17	63	(France) Mike Di Meglio	Aprilia	24	+1:17.604	27	
18	11	(Italy) Max Sabbatani	Aprilia	24	+1:20.140	20	
19	26	(Spain) Emilio Alzamora	Derbi	24	+1:40.757	21	
20	31	(Spain) Julián Simón	Malaguti	24	+1:43.908	26	
21	14	(United Kingdom) Chris Martin	Aprilia	24	+1:49.778	33	
22	78	(Hungary) Péter Lénárt	Honda	23	+1 lap	35	
23	25	(Hungary) Imre Tóth	Honda	23	+1 lap	31	
24	21	(United Kingdom) Leon Camier	Honda	23	+1 lap	37	
25	74	(France) Jimmy Petit	Honda	23	+1 lap	30	
Ret	15	(San Marino) Alex de Angelis	Aprilia	23	Accident	5	
Ret	32	(Italy) Fabrizio Lai	Malaguti	18	Retirement	22	
Ret	19	(Spain) Álvaro Bautista	Aprilia	16	Accident	23	
Ret	73	(France) William Gautier	Honda	13	Retirement	32	
Ret	86	(France) Grégory Lefort	Aprilia	11	Retirement	34	
Ret	85	(France) Xavier Herouin	Honda	10	Retirement	36	
Ret	72	(France) Alexis Masbou	Honda	9	Accident	29	
Ret	58	(Italy) Marco Simoncelli	Aprilia	4	Retirement	25	
Ret	42	(Italy) Gioele Pellino	Aprilia	3	Retirement	24	
Ret	1	(France) Arnaud Vincent	KTM	0	Accident	8	
Ret	36	(Finland) Mika Kallio	Honda	0	Retirement	13	
Ret	48	(Spain) Jorge Lorenzo	Derbi	0	Accident	3	
DNS	33	(Italy) Stefano Bianco	Gilera		Did not start		

== Championship standings after the race (MotoGP) ==
Below are the standings for the top five riders and constructors after round four has concluded.

Riders' Championship standings

Pos.	Rider	Points
1	(Italy) Valentino Rossi	90
2	(Italy) Max Biaggi	67
3	(Spain) Sete Gibernau	63
4	(Brazil) Alex Barros	46
5	(Australia) Troy Bayliss	40

Constructors' Championship standings

Pos.	Constructor	Points
1	(Japan) Honda	100
2	(Japan) Yamaha	46
3	(Italy) Ducati	45
4	(Italy) Aprilia	23
5	(Malaysia) / (United States) Proton KR	21

- Note: Only the top five positions are included for both sets of standings.

Previous race: 2003 Spanish Grand Prix	FIM Grand Prix World Championship; 2003 season	Next race: 2003 Italian Grand Prix
Previous race: 2002 French Grand Prix	French motorcycle Grand Prix	Next race: 2004 French Grand Prix
