= 2003 South African motorcycle Grand Prix =

MotoGP race

(South Africa) 2003 South African Grand Prix
Race details
- Race 2 of 16 races in the 2003 Grand Prix motorcycle racing season
- Date: 27 April 2003
- Official name: Arnette Africa's Grand Prix
- Location: Phakisa Freeway
- Course: Permanent racing facility; 4.242 km (2.636 mi)

MotoGP
Pole position
Rider	(Spain) Sete Gibernau	Honda
Time	1:33.174	
Fastest lap
Rider	(Italy) Valentino Rossi	Honda
Time	1:33.851 on lap 21	
Podium
First	(Spain) Sete Gibernau	Honda
Second	(Italy) Valentino Rossi	Honda
Third	(Italy) Max Biaggi	Honda

250cc
Pole position
Rider	(France) Randy de Puniet	Aprilia
Time	1:36.247	
Fastest lap
Rider	(San Marino) Manuel Poggiali	Aprilia
Time	1:36.649 on lap 20	
Podium
First	(San Marino) Manuel Poggiali	Aprilia
Second	(France) Randy de Puniet	Aprilia
Third	(Italy) Franco Battaini	Aprilia

125cc
Pole position
Rider	(Japan) Youichi Ui	Aprilia
Time	1:40.834	
Fastest lap
Rider	(Spain) Daniel Pedrosa	Honda
Time	1:41.006 on lap 3	
Podium
First	(Spain) Daniel Pedrosa	Honda
Second	(Italy) Andrea Dovizioso	Honda
Third	(Germany) Steve Jenkner	Aprilia

The 2003 South African motorcycle Grand Prix was the second round of the 2003 MotoGP Championship. It took place on the weekend of 25–27 April 2003 at the Phakisa Freeway.

== MotoGP classification ==
Pos.	No.	Rider	Team	Manufacturer	Laps	Time/Retired	Grid	Points
1	15	(Spain) Sete Gibernau	Telefónica Movistar Honda	Honda	28	44:10.398	1	25
2	46	(Italy) Valentino Rossi	Repsol Honda	Honda	28	+0.363	2	20
3	3	(Italy) Max Biaggi	Camel Pramac Pons	Honda	28	+5.073	3	16
4	12	(Australia) Troy Bayliss	Ducati Marlboro Team	Ducati	28	+12.606	9	13
5	4	(Brazil) Alex Barros	Gauloises Yamaha Team	Yamaha	28	+18.930	10	11
6	11	(Japan) Tohru Ukawa	Camel Pramac Pons	Honda	28	+19.113	6	10
7	69	(United States) Nicky Hayden	Repsol Honda	Honda	28	+20.156	11	9
8	17	(Japan) Norifumi Abe	Fortuna Yamaha Team	Yamaha	28	+20.870	14	8
9	7	(Spain) Carlos Checa	Fortuna Yamaha Team	Yamaha	28	+22.125	7	7
10	19	(France) Olivier Jacque	Gauloises Yamaha Team	Yamaha	28	+25.218	12	6
11	56	(Japan) Shinya Nakano	d'Antín Yamaha Team	Yamaha	28	+35.903	5	5
12	9	(Japan) Nobuatsu Aoki	Proton Team KR	Proton KR	28	+39.258	15	4
13	21	(United States) John Hopkins	Suzuki Grand Prix Team	Suzuki	28	+50.230	16	3
14	6	(Japan) Makoto Tamada	Pramac Honda	Honda	28	+1:01.441	18	2
15	10	(United States) Kenny Roberts Jr.	Suzuki Grand Prix Team	Suzuki	28	+1:04.142	17	1
16	88	(Australia) Andrew Pitt	Kawasaki Racing Team	Kawasaki	28	+1:23.083	20	
17	8	(Australia) Garry McCoy	Kawasaki Racing Team	Kawasaki	27	+1 lap	21	
Ret	41	(Japan) Noriyuki Haga	Alice Aprilia Racing	Aprilia	12	Retirement	19	
Ret	65	(Italy) Loris Capirossi	Ducati Marlboro Team	Ducati	8	Retirement	4	
Ret	45	(United States) Colin Edwards	Alice Aprilia Racing	Aprilia	0	Accident	8	
Ret	99	(United Kingdom) Jeremy McWilliams	Proton Team KR	Proton KR	0	Accident	13	

== 250 cc classification ==
Pos.	No.	Rider	Manufacturer	Laps	Time/Retired	Grid	Points
1	54	(San Marino) Manuel Poggiali	Aprilia	26	42:14.305	2	25
2	7	(France) Randy de Puniet	Aprilia	26	+0.615	1	20
3	21	(Italy) Franco Battaini	Aprilia	26	+5.641	3	16
4	5	(Argentina) Sebastián Porto	Honda	26	+12.147	5	13
5	3	(Italy) Roberto Rolfo	Honda	26	+12.967	8	11
6	14	(Australia) Anthony West	Aprilia	26	+19.569	7	10
7	10	(Spain) Fonsi Nieto	Aprilia	26	+23.080	4	9
8	24	(Spain) Toni Elías	Aprilia	26	+27.296	6	8
9	50	(France) Sylvain Guintoli	Aprilia	26	+30.187	11	7
10	8	(Japan) Naoki Matsudo	Yamaha	26	+31.447	9	6
11	33	(Spain) Héctor Faubel	Aprilia	26	+31.511	10	5
12	26	(Italy) Alex Baldolini	Aprilia	26	+39.311	15	4
13	34	(France) Eric Bataille	Honda	26	+40.209	13	3
14	16	(Sweden) Johan Stigefelt	Aprilia	26	+46.756	14	2
15	57	(United Kingdom) Chaz Davies	Aprilia	26	+54.833	20	1
16	13	(Czech Republic) Jaroslav Huleš	Yamaha	26	+1:02.623	23	
17	36	(France) Erwan Nigon	Aprilia	26	+1:09.165	18	
18	15	(Germany) Christian Gemmel	Honda	26	+1:16.891	22	
19	18	(Netherlands) Henk vd Lagemaat	Honda	25	+1 lap	24	
Ret	9	(France) Hugo Marchand	Aprilia	11	Retirement	17	
Ret	98	(Germany) Katja Poensgen	Honda	10	Retirement	25	
Ret	96	(Czech Republic) Jakub Smrž	Honda	9	Accident	16	
Ret	28	(Germany) Dirk Heidolf	Aprilia	8	Retirement	19	
Ret	11	(Spain) Joan Olivé	Aprilia	3	Retirement	21	
DSQ	6	(Spain) Alex Debón	Honda	10	Black flag	12	
OFFICIAL 250cc REPORT

== 125 cc classification ==
Pos.	No.	Rider	Manufacturer	Laps	Time/Retired	Grid	Points
1	3	(Spain) Daniel Pedrosa	Honda	24	40:46.694	7	25
2	34	(Italy) Andrea Dovizioso	Honda	24	+0.356	3	20
3	17	(Germany) Steve Jenkner	Aprilia	24	+0.548	6	16
4	41	(Japan) Youichi Ui	Aprilia	24	+0.754	1	13
5	22	(Spain) Pablo Nieto	Aprilia	24	+0.839	2	11
6	15	(San Marino) Alex de Angelis	Aprilia	24	+1.965	4	10
7	36	(Finland) Mika Kallio	Honda	24	+13.997	8	9
8	4	(Italy) Lucio Cecchinello	Aprilia	24	+14.790	11	8
9	8	(Japan) Masao Azuma	Honda	24	+16.790	12	7
10	27	(Australia) Casey Stoner	Aprilia	24	+20.649	19	6
11	23	(Italy) Gino Borsoi	Aprilia	24	+21.809	15	5
12	1	(France) Arnaud Vincent	KTM	24	+22.015	14	4
13	80	(Spain) Héctor Barberá	Aprilia	24	+23.814	13	3
14	24	(Italy) Simone Corsi	Honda	24	+23.871	16	2
15	6	(Italy) Mirko Giansanti	Aprilia	24	+24.786	9	1
16	42	(Italy) Gioele Pellino	Aprilia	24	+39.565	24	
17	12	(Switzerland) Thomas Lüthi	Honda	24	+42.280	22	
18	32	(Italy) Fabrizio Lai	Malaguti	24	+42.379	25	
19	79	(Hungary) Gábor Talmácsi	Aprilia	24	+51.145	10	
20	58	(Italy) Marco Simoncelli	Aprilia	24	+51.186	18	
21	33	(Italy) Stefano Bianco	Gilera	24	+53.316	17	
22	63	(France) Mike Di Meglio	Aprilia	24	+55.253	30	
23	26	(Spain) Emilio Alzamora	Derbi	24	+56.952	21	
24	48	(Spain) Jorge Lorenzo	Derbi	24	+57.035	20	
25	19	(Spain) Álvaro Bautista	Aprilia	24	+58.109	26	
26	14	(United Kingdom) Chris Martin	Aprilia	24	+58.622	28	
27	31	(Spain) Julián Simón	Malaguti	24	+1:05.036	27	
28	10	(Italy) Roberto Locatelli	KTM	24	+1:11.674	29	
29	78	(Hungary) Péter Lénárt	Honda	24	+1:35.808	33	
Ret	11	(Italy) Max Sabbatani	Aprilia	10	Retirement	23	
Ret	21	(United Kingdom) Leon Camier	Honda	7	Retirement	32	
Ret	25	(Hungary) Imre Tóth	Honda	2	Retirement	31	
Ret	7	(Italy) Stefano Perugini	Aprilia	1	Retirement	5	
OFFICIAL 125cc REPORT

== Championship standings after the race (MotoGP) ==
Below are the standings for the top five riders and constructors after round two has concluded.

Riders' Championship standings

Pos.	Rider	Points
1	(Italy) Valentino Rossi	45
2	(Spain) Sete Gibernau	38
3	(Italy) Max Biaggi	36
4	(Australia) Troy Bayliss	24
5	(Brazil) Alex Barros	19

Constructors' Championship standings

Pos.	Constructor	Points
1	(Japan) Honda	50
2	(Italy) Ducati	29
3	(Japan) Yamaha	19
4	(Italy) Aprilia	10
5	(Japan) Suzuki	6

- Note: Only the top five positions are included for both sets of standings.

Previous race: 2003 Japanese Grand Prix	FIM Grand Prix World Championship; 2003 season	Next race: 2003 Spanish Grand Prix
Previous race: 2002 South African Grand Prix	South African motorcycle Grand Prix	Next race: 2004 South African Grand Prix
