= Marcellino Lucchi =

Italian motorcycle racer

- Nationality: Italian
Motorcycle racing career statistics
Grand Prix motorcycle racing
Active years	1982 - 1991, 1993 - 2001, 2004
First race	1982 250cc Nations Grand Prix
Last race	2004 250cc Malaysian Grand Prix
First win	1998 250cc Italian Grand Prix
Last win	1998 250cc Italian Grand Prix
Starts / Wins / Podiums / Poles / F. laps / Points; 78 / 1 / 5 / 3 / 1 / 278

Marcellino Lucchi (born 13 March 1957 in Cesena) is an Italian former Grand Prix motorcycle road racer. His best year was in 1998 when he won the Italian Grand Prix and finished 15th in the 250cc world championship.

== Career statistics ==
=== Grand Prix motorcycle racing ===
==== Races by year ====
(key) (Races in bold indicate pole position) (Races in italics indicate fastest lap)

Year	Class	Bike	1	2	3	4	5	6	7	8	9	10	11	12	13	14	15	16	Pos.	Pts
1982	250cc	Yamaha	FRA	SPA	NAT; 7	NED	BEL	YUG; 12	GBR	SWE	FIN	CZE	RSM; 6	GER					24th	9
1983	250cc	SWM	RSA	FRA	NAT; Ret	GER	SPA	AUT	YUG	NED	BEL	GBR	SWE						NC	0
1984	250cc	Rotax	RSA	NAT; 18	SPA	AUT	GER	FRA	YUG; Ret	NED	BEL	GBR	SWE	RSM; Ret					NC	0
1985	250cc	Malanca	RSA	SPA	GER	NAT; 23	AUT	YUG	NED	BEL	FRA	GBR	SWE	RSM; 15					NC	0
1986	250cc	Aprilia	SPA	NAT; 24	GER	AUT	YUG; 19	NED	BEL	FRA; Ret	GBR	SWE	RSM; 15						NC	0
1987	250cc	Honda	JPN	SPA	GER	NAT; 23	AUT	YUG; 21	NED	FRA; DNQ	GBR; Ret	SWE	CZE	RSM; 17	POR	BRA	ARG		NC	0
1988	250cc	Honda	JPN	USA	SPA	EXP	NAT; Ret	GER	AUT	NED	BEL	YUG	FRA	GBR	SWE	CZE	BRA		NC	0
1989	250cc	Aprilia	JPN	AUS	USA	SPA	NAT; 6	GER	AUT	YUG	NED; 9	BEL	FRA	GBR	SWE	CZE	BRA		25th	17
1990	250cc	Aprilia	JPN	USA	SPA; Ret	NAT; 9	GER; Ret	AUT; 11	YUG; 14	NED; 11	BEL; 20	FRA; 21	GBR; 16	SWE	CZE; 17	HUN; Ret	AUS; 12		19th	23
1991	250cc	Aprilia	JPN	AUS	USA	SPA; Ret	ITA; Ret	GER; 22	AUT; Ret	EUR; Ret	NED; 14	FRA; Ret	GBR; Ret	RSM; 20	CZE; 16	VDM; 13	MAL		29th	23
1993	250cc	Aprilia	AUS	MAL	JPN	SPA	AUT	GER	NED	EUR	RSM; 11	GBR	CZE	ITA	USA	FIM			29th	5
1994	250cc	Aprilia	AUS	MAL	JPN	SPA	AUT	GER	NED	ITA; 5	FRA	GBR	CZE	USA	ARG	EUR			28th	5
1995	250cc	Aprilia	AUS	MAL	JPN	SPA	GER; 10	ITA; 3	NED	FRA	GBR	CZE	BRA	ARG	EUR				20th	11
1996	250cc	Aprilia	MAL	INA	JPN	SPA	ITA; 2	FRA	NED	GER; Ret	GBR; Ret	AUT	CZE	IMO; 5	CAT; 6	BRA	AUS		19th	22
1996	500cc	Aprilia	MAL	INA	JPN	SPA	ITA	FRA	NED	GER	GBR	AUT; 18	CZE; 15	IMO	CAT	BRA	AUS		32nd	1
1997	250cc	Aprilia	MAL	JPN	SPA	**ITA**; 2	AUT; Ret	FRA	NED	IMO; 6	GER	BRA	GBR	CZE	CAT	INA	AUS		18th	30
1998	250cc	Aprilia	JPN	MAL	SPA; 5	ITA; 1	FRA	MAD	NED	GBR	GER	CZE; 3	IMO; Ret	CAT; Ret	AUS	ARG			15th	52
1999	250cc	Aprilia	MAL; 6	JPN; 9	SPA; 5	FRA; 15	**ITA**; Ret	CAT; Ret	NED; Ret	GBR; 7	GER; 13	CZE	IMO; 8	VAL	AUS	RSA	BRA	ARG	17th	49
2000	250cc	Aprilia	RSA	MAL	JPN	SPA; 7	FRA	**ITA**; Ret	CAT; Ret	NED	GBR	GER	CZE	POR	VAL	BRA	PAC	AUS	26th	9
2001	250cc	Aprilia	JPN	RSA	SPA; 4	FRA	ITA; Ret	CAT	NED	GBR	GER	CZE	POR	VAL	PAC	AUS	MAL	BRA	24th	13
2004	250cc	Aprilia	RSA	SPA	FRA	ITA	CAT	NED	BRA	GER	GBR	CZE	POR	JPN	QAT	MAL; 16	AUS	VAL	NC	0
