= 1997 Austrian motorcycle Grand Prix =

(Austria) 1997 Austrian Grand Prix
Race details
- Race 5 of 15 races in the 1997 Grand Prix motorcycle racing season
- Date: 1 June 1997
- Official name: Motorrad Grand Prix von Österreich
- Location: A1-Ring
- Course: Permanent racing facility; 4.319 km (2.684 mi)

500cc
Pole position
- Rider: (Australia) Mick Doohan
- Time: 1:28.803
Fastest lap
- Rider: (Australia) Mick Doohan
- Time: 1:28.666
Podium
- First: (Australia) Mick Doohan
- Second: (Japan) Tadayuki Okada
- Third: (Italy) Luca Cadalora

250cc
Pole position
- Rider: (Germany) Ralf Waldmann
- Time: 1:32.607
Fastest lap
- Rider: (Italy) Loris Capirossi
- Time: 1:32.392
Podium
- First: (France) Olivier Jacque
- Second: (Germany) Ralf Waldmann
- Third: (Italy) Max Biaggi

125cc
Pole position
- Rider: (Japan) Noboru Ueda
- Time: 1:40.080
Fastest lap
- Rider: (Italy) Valentino Rossi
- Time: 1:39.596
Podium
- First: (Japan) Noboru Ueda
- Second: (Italy) Valentino Rossi
- Third: (Japan) Tomomi Manako

The 1997 Austrian motorcycle Grand Prix was the fifth round of the 1997 Grand Prix motorcycle racing season. It took place on 1 June 1997 at the A1-Ring.

== 500 cc classification ==
Pos.	Rider	Team	Manufacturer	Time/Retired	Points
1	(Australia) Mick Doohan	Repsol Honda Team	Honda	41:48.665	25
2	(Japan) Tadayuki Okada	Repsol Honda Team	Honda	+22.077	20
3	(Italy) Luca Cadalora	Red Bull Yamaha WCM	Yamaha	+22.471	16
4	(Japan) Nobuatsu Aoki	Rheos Elf FCC TS	Honda	+22.663	13
5	(Spain) Àlex Crivillé	Repsol Honda Team	Honda	+25.462	11
6	(Spain) Carlos Checa	Movistar Honda Pons	Honda	+28.649	10
7	(Australia) Anthony Gobert	Lucky Strike Suzuki	Suzuki	+59.010	9
8	(Spain) Alberto Puig	Movistar Honda Pons	Honda	+1:00.017	8
9	(Japan) Norifumi Abe	Yamaha Team Rainey	Yamaha	+1:02.385	7
10	(Italy) Doriano Romboni	IP Aprilia Racing Team	Aprilia	+1:02.473	6
11	(Australia) Daryl Beattie	Lucky Strike Suzuki	Suzuki	+1:03.445	5
12	(Spain) Juan Borja	Elf 500 ROC	Elf 500	+1:22.650	4
13	(Brazil) Alex Barros	Honda Gresini	Honda	+1 Lap	3
14	(France) Jean-Michel Bayle	Marlboro Team Roberts	Modenas KR3	+1 Lap	2
15	(Belgium) Laurent Naveau	Millet Racing	ROC Yamaha	+1 Lap	1
16	(Italy) Lucio Pedercini	Team Pedercini	ROC Yamaha	+1 Lap	
17	(Australia) Kirk McCarthy	World Championship Motorsports	ROC Yamaha	+1 Lap	
Ret	(Germany) Jürgen Fuchs	Elf 500 ROC	Elf 500	Retirement	
Ret	(Netherlands) Jurgen van den Goorbergh	Team Millar MQP	Honda	Retirement	
Ret	(Spain) Sete Gibernau	Yamaha Team Rainey	Yamaha	Retirement	
Ret	(Australia) Troy Corser	Red Bull Yamaha WCM	Yamaha	Retirement	
Ret	(United States) Kenny Roberts Jr.	Marlboro Team Roberts	Modenas KR3	Retirement	

== 250cc classification ==
Pos	Rider	Manufacturer	Time/Retired	Points
1	(France) Olivier Jacque	Honda	40:29.266	25
2	(Germany) Ralf Waldmann	Honda	+0.622	20
3	(Italy) Max Biaggi	Honda	+6.412	16
4	(Italy) Loris Capirossi	Aprilia	+6.415	13
5	(Japan) Tohru Ukawa	Honda	+23.358	11
6	(Italy) Stefano Perugini	Aprilia	+26.292	10
7	(Japan) Takeshi Tsujimura	TSR-Honda	+29.991	9
8	(Japan) Haruchika Aoki	Honda	+40.079	8
9	(Argentina) Sebastian Porto	Aprilia	+49.651	7
10	(Japan) Noriyasu Numata	Suzuki	+51.446	6
11	(Spain) Luis d'Antin	Yamaha	+51.553	5
12	(United Kingdom) Jamie Robinson	Suzuki	+1:02.779	4
13	(France) William Costes	Honda	+1:04.488	3
14	(Italy) Franco Battaini	Yamaha	+1:04.781	2
15	(Switzerland) Oliver Petrucciani	Aprilia	+1:09.385	1
16	(Italy) Cristiano Migliorati	Honda	+1:09.610	
17	(Japan) Tetsuya Harada	Aprilia	+1:27.184	
18	(United Kingdom) Eddie Roberts	Aprilia	+1 Lap	
19	(Spain) Eustaquio Gavira	Aprilia	+1 Lap	
20	(Austria) Uwe Bolterhauer	Honda	+1 Lap	
21	(Austria) Thomas Stadler	Honda	+1 Lap	
Ret	(Austria) Jurgen Haim	Yamaha	Retirement	
Ret	(Austria) Robert Zwidl	Aprilia	Retirement	
Ret	(Spain) Idalio Gavira	Aprilia	Retirement	
Ret	(Spain) José Luis Cardoso	Yamaha	Retirement	
Ret	(Spain) Emilio Alzamora	Honda	Retirement	
Ret	(United Kingdom) Jeremy McWilliams	Honda	Retirement	
Ret	(Italy) Luca Boscoscuro	Aprilia	Retirement	
Ret	(Japan) Osamu Miyazaki	Yamaha	Retirement	
Ret	(Italy) Marcellino Lucchi	Aprilia	Retirement	

== 125cc classification ==
Pos	Rider	Manufacturer	Time/Retired	Points
1	(Japan) Noboru Ueda	Honda	40:19.719	25
2	(Italy) Valentino Rossi	Aprilia	+0.004	20
3	(Japan) Tomomi Manako	Honda	+6.286	16
4	(Australia) Garry McCoy	Aprilia	+6.421	13
5	(Japan) Masaki Tokudome	Aprilia	+6.455	11
6	(Japan) Kazuto Sakata	Aprilia	+18.979	10
7	(Japan) Youichi Ui	Yamaha	+22.268	9
8	(Italy) Roberto Locatelli	Honda	+22.984	8
9	(Italy) Gianluigi Scalvini	Honda	+31.327	7
10	(France) Frederic Petit	Honda	+31.387	6
11	(Japan) Masao Azuma	Honda	+54.248	5
12	(Italy) Ivan Goi	Aprilia	+57.528	4
13	(Germany) Manfred Geissler	Aprilia	+1:03.939	3
14	(Spain) Enrique Maturana	Yamaha	+1:05.384	2
15	(Germany) Steve Jenkner	Aprilia	+1:24.545	1
16	(Spain) Angel Nieto Jr	Aprilia	+1:39.998	
17	(Austria) Bernd Holzleitner	Yamaha	+1 Lap	
18	(Austria) Harald Danninger	Honda	+1 Lap	
19	(Austria) Gerwin Hofer	Honda	+1 Lap	
Ret	(Austria) Benny Jerzenbeck	Honda	Retirement	
Ret	(Austria) Georg Scharl	Honda	Retirement	
Ret	(Japan) Yoshiaki Katoh	Yamaha	Retirement	
Ret	(Spain) Josep Sarda	Honda	Retirement	
Ret	(Germany) Dirk Raudies	Honda	Retirement	
Ret	(Italy) Lucio Cecchinello	Honda	Retirement	
Ret	(Czech Republic) Jaroslav Hules	Honda	Retirement	
Ret	(Italy) Gino Borsoi	Yamaha	Retirement	
Ret	(Italy) Mirko Giansanti	Honda	Retirement	
Ret	(Spain) Jorge Martinez	Aprilia	Retirement	

Previous race: 1997 Italian Grand Prix	FIM Grand Prix World Championship; 1997 season	Next race: 1997 French Grand Prix
Previous race: 1996 Austrian Grand Prix	Austrian Grand Prix	Next race: 2016 Austrian Grand Prix
