= 1999 Spanish motorcycle Grand Prix =

1999 Spain Grand Prix
Race details
- Race 3 of 16 races in the 1999 Grand Prix motorcycle racing season
- Date: 9 May 1999
- Official name: Gran Premio Marlboro de España
- Location: Circuito de Jerez, Jerez de la Frontera
- Course: Permanent racing facility; 4.423 km (2.748 mi)

500cc
Pole position
- Rider: (Spain) Àlex Crivillé
- Time: 1:43.674
Fastest lap
- Rider: (Spain) Àlex Crivillé
- Time: 1:44.657 on lap 5
Podium
- First: (Spain) Àlex Crivillé
- Second: (Italy) Max Biaggi
- Third: (Spain) Sete Gibernau

250cc
Pole position
- Rider: (Japan) Shinya Nakano
- Time: 1:44.738
Fastest lap
- Rider: (Japan) Shinya Nakano
- Time: 1:44.875 on lap 4
Podium
- First: (Italy) Valentino Rossi
- Second: (Japan) Tohru Ukawa
- Third: (Italy) Loris Capirossi

125cc
Pole position
- Rider: (Japan) Masao Azuma
- Time: 1:48.983
Fastest lap
- Rider: (Japan) Masao Azuma
- Time: 1:49.395 on lap 7
Podium
- First: (Japan) Masao Azuma
- Second: (Italy) Lucio Cecchinello
- Third: (Spain) Emilio Alzamora

The 1999 Spanish motorcycle Grand Prix was the third round of the 1999 Grand Prix motorcycle racing season. It took place on 9 May 1999 at the Circuito Permanente de Jerez. The event is notable for being the last round that 5-time 500cc and reigning World Champion Mick Doohan participated in. Doohan did not start the race due to crashing in the wet qualifying session, resulting in career-ending leg injuries.

== 500 cc classification ==
Pos.	No.	Rider	Team	Manufacturer	Laps	Time/Retired	Grid	Points
1	3	(Spain) Àlex Crivillé	Repsol Honda Team	Honda	27	47:38.667	1	25
2	2	(Italy) Max Biaggi	Marlboro Yamaha Team	Yamaha	27	+0.157	4	20
3	15	(Spain) Sete Gibernau	Repsol Honda Team	Honda	27	+6.102	7	16
4	8	(Japan) Tadayuki Okada	Repsol Honda Team	Honda	27	+6.609	14	13
5	6	(Japan) Norifumi Abe	Antena 3 Yamaha d'Antin	Yamaha	27	+6.764	9	11
6	19	(United States) John Kocinski	Kanemoto Honda	Honda	27	+17.724	8	10
7	55	(France) Régis Laconi	Red Bull Yamaha WCM	Yamaha	27	+24.037	5	9
8	7	(Italy) Luca Cadalora	Team Biland GP1	MuZ Weber	27	+28.827	15	8
9	14	(Spain) Juan Borja	Movistar Honda Pons	Honda	27	+31.290	10	7
10	4	(Spain) Carlos Checa	Marlboro Yamaha Team	Yamaha	27	+31.308	12	6
11	17	(Netherlands) Jurgen van den Goorbergh	Team Biland GP1	MuZ Weber	27	+54.233	16	5
12	26	(Japan) Haruchika Aoki	FCC TSR	TSR-Honda	27	+59.081	17	4
13	10	(United States) Kenny Roberts Jr.	Suzuki Grand Prix Team	Suzuki	27	+1:10.457	3	3
14	11	(New Zealand) Simon Crafar	Red Bull Yamaha WCM	Yamaha	27	+1:13.792	19	2
15	18	(Germany) Markus Ober	Dee Cee Jeans Racing Team	Honda	27	+1:22.765	20	1
16	20	(United States) Mike Hale	Proton KR Modenas	Modenas KR3	27	+1:26.782	23	
17	21	(United Kingdom) Michael Rutter	Millar Honda	Honda	27	+1:30.635	22	
18	68	(Australia) Mark Willis	Buckley Systems BSL Racing	BSL	26	+1 lap	24	
Ret	5	(Brazil) Alex Barros	Movistar Honda Pons	Honda	15	Retirement	6	
Ret	69	(United Kingdom) Jamie Whitham	Proton KR Modenas	Modenas KR3	11	Accident	21	
Ret	22	(France) Sébastien Gimbert	Tecmas Honda Elf	Honda	9	Accident	18	
Ret	25	(Spain) José Luis Cardoso	Team Maxon TSR	TSR-Honda	3	Retirement	13	
Ret	9	(Japan) Nobuatsu Aoki	Suzuki Grand Prix Team	Suzuki	1	Accident	2	
Ret	31	(Japan) Tetsuya Harada	Aprilia Grand Prix Racing	Aprilia	1	Retirement	11	
DNS	1	(Australia) Mick Doohan	Repsol Honda Team	Honda		Did not start/Career-ending accident in qualifying		

== 250 cc classification ==
Pos.	No.	Rider	Manufacturer	Laps	Time/Retired	Grid	Points
1	46	(Italy) Valentino Rossi	Aprilia	26	46:04.289	3	25
2	4	(Japan) Tohru Ukawa	Honda	26	+4.439	5	20
3	1	(Italy) Loris Capirossi	Honda	26	+14.096	2	16
4	21	(Italy) Franco Battaini	Aprilia	26	+24.221	4	13
5	34	(Italy) Marcellino Lucchi	Aprilia	26	+28.614	6	11
6	6	(Germany) Ralf Waldmann	Aprilia	26	+35.373	8	10
7	9	(United Kingdom) Jeremy McWilliams	Aprilia	26	+40.182	7	9
8	7	(Italy) Stefano Perugini	Honda	26	+45.096	9	8
9	44	(Italy) Roberto Rolfo	Aprilia	26	+45.483	12	7
10	37	(Italy) Luca Boscoscuro	TSR-Honda	26	+45.762	11	6
11	24	(United Kingdom) Jason Vincent	Honda	26	+46.147	10	5
12	12	(Argentina) Sebastián Porto	Yamaha	26	+52.082	16	4
13	36	(Japan) Masaki Tokudome	TSR-Honda	26	+1:00.476	14	3
14	11	(Japan) Tomomi Manako	Yamaha	26	+1:04.989	20	2
15	66	(Germany) Alex Hofmann	TSR-Honda	26	+1:09.322	15	1
16	15	(Spain) David García	Yamaha	26	+1:11.896	18	
17	14	(Australia) Anthony West	TSR-Honda	26	+1:11.911	21	
18	10	(Spain) Fonsi Nieto	Yamaha	26	+1:35.977	25	
19	41	(Netherlands) Jarno Janssen	TSR-Honda	26	+1:36.796	19	
20	63	(Malaysia) Shahrol Yuzy	Honda	26	+1:43.181	26	
21	62	(Spain) Álvaro Molina	Honda	25	+1 lap	23	
22	58	(Argentina) Matías Ríos	Aprilia	25	+1 lap	22	
23	22	(Spain) Lucas Oliver Bultó	Yamaha	25	+1 lap	30	
24	59	(Spain) Jesús Pérez	Honda	25	+1 lap	27	
25	28	(Japan) Naohiro Negishi	Honda	25	+1 lap	24	
26	60	(Spain) Alex Debón	Honda	25	+1 lap	29	
Ret	16	(Sweden) Johan Stigefelt	Yamaha	23	Accident	13	
Ret	23	(France) Julien Allemand	TSR-Honda	11	Accident	17	
Ret	56	(Japan) Shinya Nakano	Yamaha	9	Retirement	1	
Ret	64	(Spain) Manuel Luque	Yamaha	1	Retirement	28	
DNS	19	(France) Olivier Jacque	Yamaha		Did not start		

== 125 cc classification ==
Pos.	No.	Rider	Manufacturer	Laps	Time/Retired	Grid	Points
1	4	(Japan) Masao Azuma	Honda	23	42:25.263	1	25
2	5	(Italy) Lucio Cecchinello	Honda	23	+0.099	4	20
3	7	(Spain) Emilio Alzamora	Honda	23	+0.129	3	16
4	8	(Italy) Gianluigi Scalvini	Aprilia	23	+0.357	6	13
5	15	(Italy) Roberto Locatelli	Aprilia	23	+1.470	2	11
6	10	(Spain) Jerónimo Vidal	Aprilia	23	+1.950	7	10
7	16	(Italy) Simone Sanna	Honda	23	+16.948	8	9
8	6	(Japan) Noboru Ueda	Honda	23	+21.074	9	8
9	54	(San Marino) Manuel Poggiali	Aprilia	23	+27.613	10	7
10	21	(France) Arnaud Vincent	Aprilia	23	+28.855	5	6
11	26	(Italy) Ivan Goi	Honda	23	+28.959	19	5
12	23	(Italy) Gino Borsoi	Aprilia	23	+29.264	21	4
13	32	(Italy) Mirko Giansanti	Aprilia	23	+30.006	17	3
14	44	(Italy) Alessandro Brannetti	Aprilia	23	+33.254	16	2
15	1	(Japan) Kazuto Sakata	Honda	23	+34.282	13	1
16	29	(Spain) Ángel Nieto, Jr.	Honda	23	+1:03.413 (Note: Ángel Nieto, Jr. received a 30-second penalty for overtaking under yellow flags.)	20	
17	17	(Germany) Steve Jenkner	Aprilia	23	+1:13.010	15	
18	18	(Germany) Reinhard Stolz	Honda	23	+1:23.096	22	
19	20	(Germany) Bernhard Absmeier	Aprilia	23	+1:34.536	25	
20	53	(Spain) Emilio Delgado	Honda	23	+1:35.111	26	
21	55	(Spain) Antonio Elías	Honda	22	+1 lap	29	
Ret	9	(France) Frédéric Petit	Aprilia	21	Retirement	12	
Ret	11	(Italy) Max Sabbatani	Honda	21	Accident	14	
Ret	13	(Italy) Marco Melandri	Honda	21	Retirement	11	
Ret	41	(Japan) Youichi Ui	Derbi	12	Retirement	18	
Ret	56	(Spain) Adrián Araujo	Honda	6	Retirement	24	
Ret	22	(Spain) Pablo Nieto	Derbi	6	Retirement	27	
Ret	12	(France) Randy de Puniet	Aprilia	5	Retirement	23	
Ret	57	(Spain) Luis Costa	Honda	2	Accident	28	

== Championship standings after the race (500cc) ==
Below are the standings for the top five riders and constructors after round three has concluded.

Riders' Championship standings

Pos.	Rider	Points
1	(Spain) Àlex Crivillé	54
2	(United States) Kenny Roberts Jr.	53
3	(Spain) Carlos Checa	36
4	(Australia) Mick Doohan	33
5	(Spain) Sete Gibernau	33

Constructors' Championship standings

Pos.	Constructor	Points
1	(Japan) Honda	61
2	(Japan) Yamaha	56
3	(Japan) Suzuki	53
4	(Germany) MuZ Weber	11
5	(Japan) TSR-Honda	7

- Note: Only the top five positions are included for both sets of standings.

== Notes ==
Previous race: 1999 Japanese Grand Prix	FIM Grand Prix World Championship; 1999 season	Next race: 1999 French Grand Prix
Previous race: 1998 Spanish Grand Prix	Spanish Grand Prix	Next race: 2000 Spanish Grand Prix
