= 1996 Italian motorcycle Grand Prix =

(Italy) 1996 Italian Grand Prix
Race details
- Race 5 of 15 races in the 1996 Grand Prix motorcycle racing season
- Date: 26 May 1996
- Official name: Gran Premio d'Italia Polini
- Location: Mugello Circuit
- Course: Permanent racing facility; 5.245 km (3.259 mi)

500cc
Pole position
- Rider: (Australia) Mick Doohan
- Time: 1:53.260
Fastest lap
- Rider: (Spain) Àlex Crivillé
- Time: 1:54.041
Podium
- First: (Australia) Mick Doohan
- Second: (Spain) Àlex Crivillé
- Third: (Italy) Luca Cadalora

250cc
Pole position
- Rider: (Italy) Max Biaggi
- Time: 1:54.456
Fastest lap
- Rider: (Italy) Max Biaggi
- Time: 1:54.925
Podium
- First: (Italy) Max Biaggi
- Second: (Italy) Marcellino Lucchi
- Third: (Germany) Ralf Waldmann

125cc
Pole position
- Rider: (Japan) Masaki Tokudome
- Time: 2:01.292
Fastest lap
- Rider: (Japan) Akira Saito
- Time: 2:01.139
Podium
- First: (Germany) Peter Öttl
- Second: (Japan) Haruchika Aoki
- Third: (Japan) Kazuto Sakata

The 1996 Italian motorcycle Grand Prix was the fifth race of the 1996 Grand Prix motorcycle racing season. It took place on 26 May 1996 at the Mugello Circuit.

== 500 cc classification ==
| Pos. | Rider | Team | Manufacturer | Time/Retired | Points |
|---|---|---|---|---|---|
| 1 | (Australia) Mick Doohan | Team Repsol Honda | Honda | 44:04.252 | 25 |
| 2 | (Spain) Àlex Crivillé | Team Repsol Honda | Honda | +0.726 | 20 |
| 3 | (Italy) Luca Cadalora | Kanemoto Honda | Honda | +7.764 | 16 |
| 4 | (Australia) Daryl Beattie | Lucky Strike Suzuki | Suzuki | +8.202 | 13 |
| 5 | (France) Jean-Michel Bayle | Marlboro Yamaha Roberts | Yamaha | +19.421 | 11 |
| 6 | (Brazil) Alex Barros | Honda Pileri | Honda | +21.276 | 10 |
| 7 | (Japan) Tadayuki Okada | Team Repsol Honda | Honda | +21.546 | 9 |
| 8 | (Japan) Shinichi Itoh | Team Repsol Honda | Honda | +21.754 | 8 |
| 9 | (Italy) Doriano Romboni | IP Aprilia Racing Team | Aprilia | +28.733 | 7 |
| 10 | (United States) Kenny Roberts Jr. | Marlboro Yamaha Roberts | Yamaha | +28.890 | 6 |
| 11 | (Japan) Norifumi Abe | Marlboro Yamaha Roberts | Yamaha | +34.340 | 5 |
| 12 | (Spain) Alberto Puig | Fortuna Honda Pons | Honda | +34.523 | 4 |
| 13 | (Italy) Lucio Pedercini | Team Pedercini | ROC Yamaha | +1:06.905 | 3 |
| 14 | (United Kingdom) Sean Emmett | Harris Grand Prix | Harris Yamaha | +1:10.338 | 2 |
| 15 | (France) Frederic Protat | Soverex FP Racing | ROC Yamaha | +1:10.412 | 1 |
| 16 | (United Kingdom) Jeremy McWilliams | QUB Team Optimum | ROC Yamaha | +1 Lap | |
| 17 | (United Kingdom) James Haydon | World Championship Motorsports | ROC Yamaha | +1 Lap | |
| 18 | (United Kingdom) Eugene McManus | Millar Racing | Yamaha | +1 Lap | |
| 19 | (Italy) Marco Papa | Team Leone Racing | ROC Yamaha | +1 Lap | |
| Ret | (United Kingdom) Terry Rymer | Lucky Strike Suzuki | Suzuki | Retirement | |
| Ret | (Japan) Toshiyuki Arakaki | Padgett's Racing Team | Yamaha | Retirement | |
| Ret | (France) Jean-Marc Deletang | ELC Lease ROC | ROC Yamaha | Retirement | |
| Ret | (France) Jean Pierre Jeandat | Team Paton | Paton | Retirement | |
| Ret | (Spain) Juan Borja | Elf 500 ROC | Elf 500 | Retirement | |
| Ret | (Italy) Loris Capirossi | Marlboro Yamaha Roberts | Yamaha | Retirement | |
| Ret | (Switzerland) Adrien Bosshard | Elf 500 ROC | Elf 500 | Retirement | |

== 250 cc classification ==
| Pos | Rider | Manufacturer | Time/Retired | Points |
|---|---|---|---|---|
| 1 | (Italy) Max Biaggi | Aprilia | 40:36.299 | 25 |
| 2 | (Italy) Marcellino Lucchi | Aprilia | +6.914 | 20 |
| 3 | (Germany) Ralf Waldmann | Honda | +18.294 | 16 |
| 4 | (France) Olivier Jacque | Honda | +18.607 | 13 |
| 5 | (Germany) Jürgen Fuchs | Honda | +31.617 | 11 |
| 6 | (Japan) Tetsuya Harada | Yamaha | +31.649 | 10 |
| 7 | (France) Jean-Philippe Ruggia | Honda | +31.683 | 9 |
| 8 | (Japan) Nobuatsu Aoki | Honda | +47.701 | 8 |
| 9 | (Spain) Luis d'Antin | Honda | +51.186 | 7 |
| 10 | (Italy) Cristiano Migliorati | Honda | +51.556 | 6 |
| 11 | (Italy) Massimo Ottobre | Aprilia | +51.563 | 5 |
| 12 | (Switzerland) Eskil Suter | Aprilia | +51.613 | 4 |
| 13 | (Italy) Luca Boscoscuro | Aprilia | +51.617 | 3 |
| 14 | (France) Regis Laconi | Honda | +52.394 | 2 |
| 15 | (Netherlands) Jurgen vd Goorbergh | Honda | +52.569 | 1 |
| 16 | (Argentina) Sebastian Porto | Aprilia | +1:03.619 | |
| 17 | (United Kingdom) Jamie Robinson | Aprilia | +1:06.917 | |
| 18 | (Switzerland) Olivier Petrucciani | Aprilia | +1:06.945 | |
| 19 | (Italy) Alessandro Antonello | Aprilia | +1:07.099 | |
| 20 | (Japan) Osamu Miyazaki | Aprilia | +1:32.873 | |
| 21 | (Italy) Davide Bulega | Aprilia | +1:32.902 | |
| 22 | (Japan) Yasumasa Hatakeyama | Honda | +1:34.039 | |
| 23 | (Italy) Franco Battaini | Aprilia | +1:34.363 | |
| 24 | (Spain) Sete Gibernau | Honda | +1:34.931 | |
| 25 | (France) Christian Boudinot | Aprilia | +1:41.263 | |
| 26 | (Venezuela) José Barresi | Yamaha | +1 Lap | |
| 27 | (Italy) Roberto Rolfo | Aprilia | +1 Lap | |
| 28 | (France) Cristophe Cogan | Honda | +1 Lap | |
| Ret | (Italy) Gianluigi Scalvini | Honda | Retirement | |
| Ret | (Italy) Roberto Locatelli | Aprilia | Retirement | |
| Ret | (Japan) Takeshi Tsujimura | Honda | Retirement | |

== 125 cc classification ==
| Pos | Rider | Manufacturer | Time/Retired | Points |
|---|---|---|---|---|
| 1 | (Germany) Peter Öttl | Aprilia | 40:56.454 | 25 |
| 2 | (Japan) Haruchika Aoki | Honda | +1.520 | 20 |
| 3 | (Japan) Kazuto Sakata | Aprilia | +1.557 | 16 |
| 4 | (Italy) Valentino Rossi | Aprilia | +1.635 | 13 |
| 5 | (Japan) Akira Saito | Honda | +1.672 | 11 |
| 6 | (Italy) Lucio Cecchinello | Honda | +3.458 | 10 |
| 7 | (Spain) Emilio Alzamora | Honda | +3.540 | 9 |
| 8 | (Italy) Ivan Goi | Honda | +3.545 | 8 |
| 9 | (Japan) Tomomi Manako | Honda | +3.600 | 7 |
| 10 | (Germany) Manfred Geissler | Aprilia | +3.742 | 6 |
| 11 | (Italy) Andrea Ballerini | Aprilia | +4.472 | 5 |
| 12 | (Japan) Noboru Ueda | Honda | +4.746 | 4 |
| 13 | (Spain) Jorge Martinez | Aprilia | +5.404 | 3 |
| 14 | (Japan) Masaki Tokudome | Aprilia | +14.516 | 2 |
| 15 | (Czech Republic) Jaroslav Hules | Honda | +15.502 | 1 |
| 16 | (Japan) Yoshiaki Katoh | Yamaha | +23.334 | |
| 17 | (Spain) Josep Sarda | Honda | +40.866 | |
| 18 | (Japan) Youichi Ui | Yamaha | +41.340 | |
| 19 | (Italy) Roberto Bellei | Honda | +55.620 | |
| 20 | (Australia) Garry McCoy | Aprilia | +56.958 | |
| 21 | (Italy) Gabriele Debbia | Yamaha | +1:12.996 | |
| 22 | (United Kingdom) Darren Barton | Aprilia | +1:19.446 | |
| 23 | (Italy) Gino Borsoi | Aprilia | +1:41.442 | |
| Ret | (Spain) Angel Nieto Jr | Aprilia | Retirement | |
| Ret | (Italy) Stefano Perugini | Aprilia | Retirement | |
| Ret | (Italy) Mirko Giansanti | Honda | Retirement | |
| Ret | (France) Frederic Petit | Honda | Retirement | |
| Ret | (Spain) Herri Torrontegui | Honda | Retirement | |
| Ret | (Italy) Paolo Tessari | Honda | Retirement | |
| Ret | (Germany) Dirk Raudies | Honda | Retirement | |
| Ret | (Italy) Stefano Cruciani | Aprilia | Retirement | |
| Ret | (Netherlands) Loek Bodelier | Honda | Retirement | |
| Ret | (Italy) Igor Antonelli | Honda | Retirement | |

| Previous race: 1996 Spanish Grand Prix | FIM Grand Prix World Championship; 1996 season | Next race: 1996 French Grand Prix |
| Previous race: 1995 Italian Grand Prix | Italian Grand Prix | Next race: 1997 Italian Grand Prix |
