= 1997 Italian motorcycle Grand Prix =

(Italy) 1997 Italian Grand Prix
Race details
- Race 4 of 15 races in the 1997 Grand Prix motorcycle racing season
- Date: 18 May 1997
- Official name: Gran Premio d'Italia Polini
- Location: Autodromo Internazionale del Mugello
- Course: Permanent racing facility; 5.245 km (3.259 mi)

500cc
Pole position
- Rider: (Australia) Mick Doohan
- Time: 1:53.387
Fastest lap
- Rider: (Australia) Mick Doohan
- Time: 1:54.144
Podium
- First: (Australia) Mick Doohan
- Second: (Italy) Luca Cadalora
- Third: (Japan) Nobuatsu Aoki

250cc
Pole position
- Rider: (Italy) Marcellino Lucchi
- Time: 1:54.474
Fastest lap
- Rider: (Germany) Ralf Waldmann
- Time: 1:55.416
Podium
- First: (Italy) Max Biaggi
- Second: (Italy) Marcellino Lucchi
- Third: (Italy) Loris Capirossi

125cc
Pole position
- Rider: (Spain) Jorge Martínez
- Time: 2:00.863
Fastest lap
- Rider: (Japan) Noboru Ueda
- Time: 2:00.555
Podium
- First: (Italy) Valentino Rossi
- Second: (Spain) Jorge Martínez
- Third: (Australia) Garry McCoy

The 1997 Italian motorcycle Grand Prix was the fourth race of the 1997 Grand Prix motorcycle racing season. It took place on 18 May 1997 at the Mugello Circuit.

== 500 cc classification ==
Pos.	Rider	Team	Manufacturer	Time/Retired	Points
1	(Australia) Mick Doohan	Repsol Honda Team	Honda	44:06.442	25
2	(Italy) Luca Cadalora	Red Bull Yamaha WCM	Yamaha	+10.056	20
3	(Japan) Nobuatsu Aoki	Rheos Elf FCC TS	Honda	+17.349	16
4	(Spain) Àlex Crivillé	Repsol Honda Team	Honda	+19.145	13
5	(Australia) Daryl Beattie	Lucky Strike Suzuki	Suzuki	+21.089	11
6	(Brazil) Alex Barros	Honda Gresini	Honda	+21.393	10
7	(Japan) Norifumi Abe	Yamaha Team Rainey	Yamaha	+29.190	9
8	(France) Jean-Michel Bayle	Marlboro Team Roberts	Modenas KR3	+29.414	8
9	(Spain) Sete Gibernau	Yamaha Team Rainey	Yamaha	+30.704	7
10	(France) Régis Laconi	Team Tecmas	Honda	+37.012	6
11	(Italy) Doriano Romboni	IP Aprilia Racing Team	Aprilia	+51.222	5
12	(Australia) Troy Corser	Red Bull Yamaha WCM	Yamaha	+1:25.556	4
13	(Australia) Anthony Gobert	Lucky Strike Suzuki	Suzuki	+1:33.610	3
14	(Australia) Kirk McCarthy	World Championship Motorsports	ROC Yamaha	+1:43.717	2
15	(Italy) Lucio Pedercini	Team Pedercini	Yamaha	+1:56.633	1
16	(Belgium) Laurent Naveau	Millet Racing	ROC Yamaha	+1 Lap	
17	(France) Frédéric Protat	Soverex FP Racing	Honda	+1 Lap	
Ret	(Spain) Alberto Puig	Movistar Honda Pons	Honda	Retirement	
Ret	(Germany) Jürgen Fuchs	Elf 500 ROC	Elf 500	Retirement	
Ret	(Netherlands) Jurgen van den Goorbergh	Team Millar MQP	Honda	Retirement	
Ret	(Japan) Tadayuki Okada	Repsol Honda Team	Honda	Retirement	
Ret	(Spain) Carlos Checa	Movistar Honda Pons	Honda	Retirement	
Ret	(Spain) Juan Borja	Elf 500 ROC	Elf 500	Retirement	
Ret	(Japan) Takuma Aoki	Repsol Honda	Honda	Retirement	
Ret	(Italy) Francesco Monaco	Team Paton	Paton	Retirement	
Ret	(United States) Kenny Roberts Jr.	Marlboro Team Roberts	Modenas KR3	Retirement	

== 250 cc classification ==
Pos	Rider	Manufacturer	Time/Retired	Points
1	(Italy) Max Biaggi	Honda	40:47.548	25
2	(Italy) Marcellino Lucchi	Aprilia	+0.050	20
3	(Italy) Loris Capirossi	Aprilia	+0.068	16
4	(Germany) Ralf Waldmann	Honda	+4.174	13
5	(France) Olivier Jacque	Honda	+19.185	11
6	(Japan) Noriyasu Numata	Suzuki	+43.619	10
7	(Italy) Stefano Perugini	Aprilia	+51.447	9
8	(United Kingdom) Jamie Robinson	Suzuki	+51.552	8
9	(United Kingdom) Jeremy McWilliams	Honda	+54.271	7
10	(Argentina) Sebastian Porto	Aprilia	+55.006	6
11	(Spain) Luis d'Antin	Yamaha	+55.106	5
12	(Italy) Luca Boscoscuro	Honda	+55.983	4
13	(Italy) Franco Battaini	Yamaha	+56.734	3
14	(Japan) Haruchika Aoki	Honda	+57.503	2
15	(Japan) Osamu Miyazaki	Yamaha	+1:12.080	1
16	(Switzerland) Oliver Petrucciani	Aprilia	+1:28.701	
17	(France) William Costes	Honda	+1:29.037	
18	(Spain) Idalio Gavira	Aprilia	+1:53.840	
19	(Italy) Walter Tortoroglio	Aprilia	+2 Laps	
Ret	(Japan) Tohru Ukawa	Honda	Retirement	
Ret	(Japan) Takeshi Tsujimura	TSR-Honda	Retirement	
Ret	(Italy) Cristiano Migliorati	Honda	Retirement	
Ret	(Spain) Oscar Sainz	Aprilia	Retirement	
Ret	(United Kingdom) Eddie Roberts	Aprilia	Retirement	
Ret	(Spain) José Luis Cardoso	Yamaha	Retirement	
Ret	(Italy) Fabio Carpani	Aprilia	Retirement	
Ret	(Spain) Eustaquio Gavira	Aprilia	Retirement	
Ret	(Spain) Emilio Alzamora	Honda	Retirement	
Ret	(Japan) Tetsuya Harada	Aprilia	Retirement	

== 125 cc classification ==
Pos	Rider	Manufacturer	Time/Retired	Points
1	(Italy) Valentino Rossi	Aprilia	40:40.093	25
2	(Spain) Jorge Martinez	Aprilia	+3.311	20
3	(Australia) Garry McCoy	Aprilia	+3.313	16
4	(Japan) Noboru Ueda	Honda	+3.380	13
5	(Japan) Tomomi Manako	Honda	+3.394	11
6	(Japan) Kazuto Sakata	Aprilia	+3.397	10
7	(Japan) Masaki Tokudome	Aprilia	+3.887	9
8	(Italy) Lucio Cecchinello	Honda	+7.595	8
9	(France) Frederic Petit	Honda	+17.577	7
10	(Japan) Youichi Ui	Yamaha	+17.619	6
11	(Japan) Masao Azuma	Honda	+37.303	5
12	(Italy) Gianluigi Scalvini	Honda	+37.403	4
13	(Italy) Ivan Goi	Aprilia	+37.431	3
14	(Italy) Roberto Locatelli	Honda	+37.479	2
15	(Japan) Yoshiaki Katoh	Honda	+37.508	1
16	(Italy) Mirko Giansanti	Honda	+37.803	
17	(Germany) Manfred Geissler	Honda	+38.126	
18	(Spain) Enrique Maturana	Yamaha	+38.135	
19	(Spain) Josep Sarda	Honda	+1:18.683	
20	(Germany) Dirk Raudies	Honda	+1:18.725	
21	(Italy) Roberto Bellei	Honda	+1:18.853	
22	(Germany) Steve Jenkner	Aprilia	+1:21.155	
23	(Spain) Angel Nieto Jr	Aprilia	+1:48.618	
24	(Italy) Simone Sanna	Aprilia	+1 Lap	
Ret	(Italy) Marco Borciani	Honda	Retirement	
Ret	(Italy) Igor Antonelli	Honda	Retirement	
Ret	(Italy) Federico Cerroni	Aprilia	Retirement	
Ret	(Germany) Peter Öttl	Aprilia	Retirement	
Ret	(Italy) Gino Borsoi	Yamaha	Retirement	

Previous race: 1997 Spanish Grand Prix	FIM Grand Prix World Championship; 1997 season	Next race: 1997 Austrian Grand Prix
Previous race: 1996 Italian Grand Prix	Italian Grand Prix	Next race: 1998 Italian Grand Prix
