= 1997 City of Imola motorcycle Grand Prix =

(Bologna) 1997 City of Imola Grand Prix
Race details
- Race 8 of 15 races in the 1997 Grand Prix motorcycle racing season
- Date: 6 July 1997
- Official name: Gran Premio Città di Imola
- Location: Autodromo Enzo e Dino Ferrari
- Course: Permanent racing facility; 4.930 km (3.063 mi)

500cc
Pole position
- Rider: (Australia) Mick Doohan
- Time: 1:48.997
Fastest lap
- Rider: (Australia) Mick Doohan
- Time: 1:49.436
Podium
- First: (Australia) Mick Doohan
- Second: (Japan) Nobuatsu Aoki
- Third: (Japan) Takuma Aoki

250cc
Pole position
- Rider: (France) Olivier Jacque
- Time: 1:51.582
Fastest lap
- Rider: (Japan) Tetsuya Harada
- Time: 1:51.872
Podium
- First: (Italy) Max Biaggi
- Second: (France) Olivier Jacque
- Third: (Japan) Tohru Ukawa

125cc
Pole position
- Rider: (Italy) Valentino Rossi
- Time: 1:58.886
Fastest lap
- Rider: (Italy) Valentino Rossi
- Time: 1:58.490
Podium
- First: (Italy) Valentino Rossi
- Second: (Japan) Tomomi Manako
- Third: (Japan) Kazuto Sakata

The 1997 City of Imola motorcycle Grand Prix was the eighth round of the 1997 Grand Prix motorcycle racing season. It took place on 6 July 1997 at the Autodromo Enzo e Dino Ferrari.

== 500 cc classification ==
| Pos. | Rider | Team | Manufacturer | Time/Retired | Points |
|---|---|---|---|---|---|
| 1 | (Australia) Mick Doohan | Repsol YPF Honda Team | Honda | 45:58.995 | 25 |
| 2 | (Japan) Nobuatsu Aoki | Rheos Elf FCC TS | Honda | +8.646 | 20 |
| 3 | (Japan) Takuma Aoki | Repsol Honda | Honda | +20.016 | 16 |
| 4 | (Spain) Carlos Checa | Movistar Honda Pons | Honda | +24.570 | 13 |
| 5 | (Japan) Tadayuki Okada | Repsol YPF Honda Team | Honda | +25.884 | 11 |
| 6 | (Italy) Luca Cadalora | Red Bull Yamaha WCM | Yamaha | +26.080 | 10 |
| 7 | (Japan) Norifumi Abe | Yamaha Team Rainey | Yamaha | +29.374 | 9 |
| 8 | (France) Jean-Michel Bayle | Marlboro Team Roberts | Modenas KR3 | +40.881 | 8 |
| 9 | (Brazil) Alex Barros | Honda Gresini | Honda | +43.539 | 7 |
| 10 | (Australia) Anthony Gobert | Lucky Strike Suzuki | Suzuki | +1:01.383 | 6 |
| 11 | (Spain) Sete Gibernau | Yamaha Team Rainey | Yamaha | +1:05.922 | 5 |
| 12 | (Spain) Alberto Puig | Movistar Honda Pons | Honda | +1:06.775 | 4 |
| 13 | (Australia) Daryl Beattie | Lucky Strike Suzuki | Suzuki | +1:13.074 | 3 |
| 14 | (Germany) Jürgen Fuchs | Elf 500 ROC | Elf 500 | +1:14.719 | 2 |
| 15 | (Australia) Kirk McCarthy | World Championship Motorsports | ROC Yamaha | +1:46.200 | 1 |
| 16 | (Italy) Lucio Pedercini | Team Pedercini | ROC Yamaha | +1:55.880 | |
| 17 | (United States) Kenny Roberts Jr. | Marlboro Team Roberts | Modenas KR3 | +1 Lap | |
| 18 | (France) Frédéric Protat | Soverex FP Racing | Honda | +1 Lap | |
| 19 | (Italy) Francesco Monaco | Team Paton | Paton | +1 Lap | |
| Ret | (Netherlands) Jurgen van den Goorbergh | Team Millar MQP | Honda | Retirement | |
| Ret | (France) Bernard Garcia | Team Tecmas | Honda | Retirement | |
| Ret | (Belgium) Laurent Naveau | Millet Racing | ROC Yamaha | Retirement | |
| Ret | (Italy) Doriano Romboni | IP Aprilia Racing Team | Aprilia | Retirement | |
| Ret | (Spain) Juan Borja | Elf 500 ROC | Elf 500 | Retirement | |

== 250 cc classification ==
| Pos | Rider | Manufacturer | Time/Retired | Points |
|---|---|---|---|---|
| 1 | (Italy) Max Biaggi | Honda | +43:17.419 | 25 |
| 2 | (France) Olivier Jacque | Honda | +0.656 | 20 |
| 3 | (Japan) Tohru Ukawa | Honda | +0.816 | 16 |
| 4 | (Germany) Ralf Waldmann | Honda | +6.500 | 13 |
| 5 | (Japan) Tetsuya Harada | Aprilia | +27.143 | 11 |
| 6 | (Italy) Marcellino Lucchi | Aprilia | +54.157 | 10 |
| 7 | (United Kingdom) Jeremy McWilliams | Honda | +57.951 | 9 |
| 8 | (Japan) Haruchika Aoki | Honda | +1:01.580 | 8 |
| 9 | (Japan) Osamu Miyazaki | Yamaha | +1:12.813 | 7 |
| 10 | (Spain) Emilio Alzamora | Honda | +1:13.752 | 6 |
| 11 | (Italy) Franco Battaini | Yamaha | +1:13.924 | 5 |
| 12 | (France) William Costes | Honda | +1:16.926 | 4 |
| 13 | (Italy) Cristiano Migliorati | Honda | +1:17.031 | 3 |
| 14 | (Spain) José Luis Cardoso | Yamaha | +1:18.149 | 2 |
| 15 | (United Kingdom) Jamie Robinson | Suzuki | +1:27.289 | 1 |
| 16 | (Switzerland) Oliver Petrucciani | Aprilia | +1:29.273 | |
| 17 | (Italy) Davide Bulega | Aprilia | +1 Lap | |
| Ret | (Italy) Giuseppe Fiorillo | Aprilia | Retirement | |
| Ret | (Japan) Takeshi Tsujimura | TSR-Honda | Retirement | |
| Ret | (Spain) Idalio Gavira | Aprilia | Retirement | |
| Ret | (Spain) Eustaquio Gavira | Aprilia | Retirement | |
| Ret | (Spain) Luis d'Antin | Yamaha | Retirement | |
| Ret | (Argentina) Sebastian Porto | Aprilia | Retirement | |
| Ret | (Italy) Stefano Perugini | Aprilia | Retirement | |
| Ret | (Japan) Noriyasu Numata | Aprilia | Retirement | |
| Ret | (Italy) Luca Boscoscuro | Honda | Retirement | |
| Ret | (Italy) Loris Capirossi | Aprilia | Retirement | |

== 125 cc classification ==
| Pos | Rider | Manufacturer | Time/Retired | Points |
|---|---|---|---|---|
| 1 | (Italy) Valentino Rossi | Aprilia | 41:50.114 | 25 |
| 2 | (Japan) Tomomi Manako | Honda | +1.625 | 20 |
| 3 | (Japan) Kazuto Sakata | Aprilia | +23.551 | 16 |
| 4 | (Australia) Garry McCoy | Aprilia | +27.062 | 13 |
| 5 | (Japan) Noboru Ueda | Honda | +28.196 | 11 |
| 6 | (Spain) Jorge Martinez | Aprilia | +28.864 | 10 |
| 7 | (Italy) Roberto Locatelli | Honda | +29.740 | 9 |
| 8 | (Japan) Youichi Ui | Yamaha | +35.136 | 8 |
| 9 | (Japan) Masao Azuma | Honda | +54.446 | 7 |
| 10 | (Italy) Mirko Giansanti | Honda | +54.818 | 6 |
| 11 | (Italy) Gianluigi Scalvini | Honda | +56.181 | 5 |
| 12 | (Japan) Yoshiaki Katoh | Yamaha | +59.278 | 4 |
| 13 | (Czech Republic) Jaroslav Hules | Honda | +1:00.363 | 3 |
| 14 | (Spain) Angel Nieto Jr | Aprilia | +1:17.331 | 2 |
| 15 | (Germany) Peter Öttl | Aprilia | +1:17.958 | 1 |
| 16 | (Germany) Manfred Geissler | Honda | +1:25.233 | |
| 17 | (Germany) Dirk Raudies | Honda | +1:30.576 | |
| 18 | (Germany) Steve Jenkner | Aprilia | +1:51.087 | |
| 19 | (Italy) Christian Pistoni | Honda | +1:52.460 | |
| 20 | (Italy) Maurizio Cucchiarini | Honda | +2:22.679 | |
| Ret | (Spain) Josep Sarda | Honda | Retirement | |
| Ret | (Japan) Masaki Tokudome | Aprilia | Retirement | |
| Ret | (Italy) Lucio Cecchinello | Honda | Retirement | |
| Ret | (Spain) Enrique Maturana | Yamaha | Retirement | |
| Ret | (Italy) Gino Borsoi | Yamaha | Retirement | |
| Ret | (France) Frederic Petit | Honda | Retirement | |
| Ret | (Italy) Ivan Goi | Aprilia | Retirement | |
| Ret | (Italy) Igor Antonelli | Honda | Retirement | |
| Ret | (Italy) Paolo Tessari | Honda | Retirement | |
| Ret | (Italy) Gabriele Debbia | Yamaha | Retirement | |

| Previous race: 1997 Dutch TT | FIM Grand Prix World Championship; 1997 season | Next race: 1997 German Grand Prix |
| Previous race: 1996 Imola Grand Prix | Imola Grand Prix | Next race: 1998 Imola Grand Prix |
