= 1998 Italian motorcycle Grand Prix =

(Italy) 1998 Italian Grand Prix
Race details
- Race 4 of 14 races in the 1998 Grand Prix motorcycle racing season
- Date: 17 May 1998
- Official name: Gran Premio Q8 d'Italia
- Location: Mugello Circuit
- Course: Permanent racing facility; 5.245 km (3.259 mi)

500cc
Pole position
Rider	(Australia) Mick Doohan	Honda
Time	1:53.282	
Fastest lap
Rider	(Australia) Mick Doohan	Honda
Time	1:53.342 on lap 7	
Podium
First	(Australia) Mick Doohan	Honda
Second	(Italy) Max Biaggi	Honda
Third	(Spain) Àlex Crivillé	Honda

250cc
Pole position
Rider	(Japan) Tetsuya Harada	Aprilia
Time	1:54.683	
Fastest lap
Rider	(Italy) Marcellino Lucchi	Aprilia
Time	1:55.467 on lap 8	
Podium
First	(Italy) Marcellino Lucchi	Aprilia
Second	(Italy) Valentino Rossi	Aprilia
Third	(Japan) Tetsuya Harada	Aprilia

125cc
Pole position
Rider	(Japan) Noboru Ueda	Honda
Time	2:00.419	
Fastest lap
Rider	(Italy) Lucio Cecchinello	Honda
Time	2:00.966 on lap 3	
Podium
First	(Japan) Tomomi Manako	Honda
Second	(Italy) Marco Melandri	Honda
Third	(Italy) Gianluigi Scalvini	Honda

The 1998 Italian motorcycle Grand Prix was the fourth race of the 1998 Grand Prix motorcycle racing season. It took place on 17 May 1998 at the Mugello Circuit.

== 500 cc classification ==
Pos.	No.	Rider	Team	Manufacturer	Laps	Time/Retired	Grid	Points
1	1	(Australia) Mick Doohan	Repsol Honda	Honda	23	43:55.307	1	25
2	6	(Italy) Max Biaggi	Marlboro Team Kanemoto	Honda	23	+5.395	3	20
3	4	(Spain) Àlex Crivillé	Repsol Honda	Honda	23	+13.141	5	16
4	8	(Spain) Carlos Checa	Movistar Honda Pons	Honda	23	+19.647	4	13
5	19	(United States) John Kocinski	Movistar Honda Pons	Honda	23	+19.826	6	11
6	5	(Japan) Norick Abe	Yamaha Team Rainey	Yamaha	23	+21.881	7	10
7	11	(New Zealand) Simon Crafar	Red Bull Yamaha WCM	Yamaha	23	+22.626	11	9
8	3	(Japan) Nobuatsu Aoki	Suzuki Grand Prix Team	Suzuki	23	+24.235	8	8
9	9	(Brazil) Alex Barros	Honda Gresini	Honda	23	+27.943	2	7
10	55	(France) Régis Laconi	Red Bull Yamaha WCM	Yamaha	23	+40.767	10	6
11	28	(Germany) Ralf Waldmann	Marlboro Team Roberts	Modenas KR3	23	+47.331	19	5
12	21	(Japan) Kyoji Nanba	Yamaha Team Rainey	Yamaha	23	+59.623	16	4
13	18	(Australia) Garry McCoy	Shell Advance Racing	Honda	23	+1:04.004	9	3
14	15	(Spain) Sete Gibernau	Repsol Honda	Honda	23	+1:09.319	14	2
15	22	(France) Sébastien Gimbert	Repsol Honda	Honda	23	+1:14.294	17	1
16	17	(Netherlands) Jurgen van den Goorbergh	Dee Cee Jeans Racing Team	Honda	23	+1:15.781	18	
17	25	(Japan) Yukio Kagayama	Suzuki Grand Prix Team	Suzuki	23	+1:16.909	12	
18	77	(Switzerland) Eskil Suter	MuZ Roc RennSport	MuZ	23	+2:02.092	20	
19	88	(United Kingdom) Scott Smart	Team Millar Honda Britain	Honda	22	+1 lap	22	
20	57	(Italy) Fabio Carpani	Team Polini Inoxmacel	Honda	22	+1 lap	24	
Ret	63	(Italy) Gianmaria Liverani	Team Paton	Paton	21	Retirement	23	
Ret	14	(Spain) Juan Borja	Shell Advance Racing	Honda	15	Retirement	15	
Ret	10	(United States) Kenny Roberts Jr.	Team Roberts	Modenas KR3	11	Retirement	13	
Ret	23	(United States) Matt Wait	FCC TSR	Honda	0	Accident	21	
DNQ	2	(Japan) Tadayuki Okada	Repsol Honda	Honda		Did not qualify		

== 250 cc classification ==
The race was held in two parts as rain caused its interruption; aggregate times from the two heats determined the final result.

Pos.	No.	Rider	Manufacturer	Laps	Time/Retired	Grid	Points
1	34	(Italy) Marcellino Lucchi	Aprilia	21	40:59.049	3	25
2	46	(Italy) Valentino Rossi	Aprilia	21	+5.701	4	20
3	31	(Japan) Tetsuya Harada	Aprilia	21	+7.625	1	16
4	65	(Italy) Loris Capirossi	Aprilia	21	+10.029	2	13
5	4	(Italy) Stefano Perugini	Honda	21	+47.830	13	11
6	6	(Japan) Haruchika Aoki	Honda	21	+48.205	12	10
7	5	(Japan) Tohru Ukawa	Honda	21	+49.376	11	9
8	17	(Spain) José Luis Cardoso	Yamaha	21	+50.080	8	8
9	8	(Spain) Luis d'Antin	Yamaha	21	+50.161	16	7
10	37	(Italy) Luca Boscoscuro	TSR-Honda	21	+52.738	15	6
11	21	(Italy) Franco Battaini	Yamaha	21	+54.241	17	5
12	7	(Japan) Takeshi Tsujimura	Yamaha	21	+54.306	18	4
13	25	(Japan) Yasumasa Hatakeyama	ERP Honda	21	+1:50.752	23	3
14	14	(Italy) Davide Bulega	Honda	21	+1:53.990	22	2
15	41	(Argentina) Federico Gartner	Aprilia	21	+2:22.611	24	1
16	20	(France) William Costes	Honda	20	+1 lap	21	
Ret	18	(Japan) Osamu Miyazaki	Yamaha	19	Accident	19	
Ret	9	(United Kingdom) Jeremy McWilliams	TSR-Honda	19	Retirement	7	
Ret	27	(Argentina) Sebastián Porto	Aprilia	14	Accident	10	
Ret	12	(Japan) Noriyasu Numata	Suzuki	11	Retirement	14	
Ret	19	(France) Olivier Jacque	Honda	10	Retirement	6	
Ret	24	(United Kingdom) Jason Vincent	TSR-Honda	6	Retirement	20	
Ret	11	(Germany) Jürgen Fuchs	Aprilia	2	Retirement	5	
Ret	44	(Italy) Roberto Rolfo	TSR-Honda	1	Accident	9	
DNS	16	(Sweden) Johan Stigefelt	Suzuki		Did not start		

== 125 cc classification ==
Pos.	No.	Rider	Manufacturer	Laps	Time/Retired	Grid	Points
1	3	(Japan) Tomomi Manako	Honda	20	40:53.607	3	25
2	13	(Italy) Marco Melandri	Honda	20	+0.044	8	20
3	8	(Italy) Gianluigi Scalvini	Honda	20	+0.201	5	16
4	4	(Japan) Kazuto Sakata	Aprilia	20	+3.152	2	13
5	41	(Japan) Youichi Ui	Yamaha	20	+8.162	7	11
6	23	(Italy) Gino Borsoi	Aprilia	20	+8.195	14	10
7	2	(Japan) Noboru Ueda	Honda	20	+10.097	1	9
8	9	(France) Frédéric Petit	Honda	20	+12.745	11	8
9	20	(Japan) Masao Azuma	Honda	20	+12.757	13	7
10	5	(Japan) Masaki Tokudome	Aprilia	20	+24.284	10	6
11	21	(France) Arnaud Vincent	Aprilia	20	+24.388	18	5
12	18	(Italy) Paolo Tessari	Aprilia	20	+24.415	6	4
13	26	(Italy) Ivan Goi	Aprilia	20	+25.393	15	3
14	22	(Germany) Steve Jenkner	Aprilia	20	+31.066	16	2
15	64	(Italy) Claudio Cipriani	Aprilia	20	+49.419	19	1
16	59	(Spain) Jerónimo Vidal	Aprilia	20	+52.007	21	
17	7	(Spain) Emilio Alzamora	Aprilia	20	+1:01.180	20	
18	17	(Spain) Enrique Maturana	Yamaha	20	+1:01.801	24	
19	62	(Japan) Yoshiaki Katoh	Yamaha	20	+1:04.438	25	
20	63	(Switzerland) Marco Tresoldi	Honda	20	+1:12.177	23	
Ret	32	(Italy) Mirko Giansanti	Honda	19	Accident	9	
Ret	10	(Italy) Lucio Cecchinello	Honda	19	Accident	12	
Ret	65	(Italy) Andrea Iommi	Honda	14	Retirement	27	
Ret	39	(Czech Republic) Jaroslav Huleš	Honda	11	Retirement	22	
Ret	16	(Italy) Christian Manna	Yamaha	5	Accident	26	
Ret	15	(Italy) Roberto Locatelli	Honda	4	Retirement	4	
Ret	29	(Spain) Ángel Nieto, Jr.	Aprilia	4	Retirement	17	

== Championship standings after the race (500cc) ==
Below are the standings for the top five riders and constructors after round four has concluded.

Riders' Championship standings

Pos.	Rider	Points
1	(Italy) Max Biaggi	77
2	(Australia) Mick Doohan	70
3	(Spain) Àlex Crivillé	67
4	(Spain) Carlos Checa	54
5	(United States) John Kocinski	30

Constructors' Championship standings

Pos.	Constructor	Points
1	(Japan) Honda	100
2	(Japan) Yamaha	45
3	(Japan) Suzuki	36
4	(Malaysia) Modenas KR3	24
5	(Germany) MuZ	4

- Note: Only the top five positions are included for both sets of standings.

Previous race: 1998 Spanish Grand Prix	FIM Grand Prix World Championship; 1998 season	Next race: 1998 French Grand Prix
Previous race: 1997 Italian Grand Prix	Italian Grand Prix	Next race: 1999 Italian Grand Prix
