= 1996 Rio de Janeiro motorcycle Grand Prix =

(Rio de Janeiro (state)) 1996 Rio de Janeiro Grand Prix
Race details
- Race 14 of 15 races in the 1996 Grand Prix motorcycle racing season
- Date: 6 October 1996
- Official name: GP Rio
- Location: Autódromo Internacional Nelson Piquet
- Course: Permanent racing facility; 4.933 km (3.065 mi)

MotoGP
Pole position
- Rider: (Australia) Mick Doohan
- Time: 1:53.293
Fastest lap
- Rider: (Australia) Mick Doohan
- Time: 1:53.602
Podium
- First: (Australia) Mick Doohan
- Second: (Spain) Àlex Crivillé
- Third: (Japan) Norick Abe

250cc
Pole position
- Rider: (France) Olivier Jacque
- Time: 1:55.955
Fastest lap
- Rider: (France) Olivier Jacque
- Time: 1:56.004
Podium
- First: (France) Olivier Jacque
- Second: (Germany) Ralf Waldmann
- Third: (Germany) Jürgen Fuchs

125cc
Pole position
- Rider: (Japan) Haruchika Aoki
- Time: 2:01.583
Fastest lap
- Rider: (Japan) Haruchika Aoki
- Time: 2:01.306
Podium
- First: (Japan) Haruchika Aoki
- Second: (Spain) Emilio Alzamora
- Third: (Japan) Masaki Tokudome

The 1996 Rio de Janeiro motorcycle Grand Prix was the penultimate round of the 1996 Grand Prix motorcycle racing season. It took place on 6 October 1996 at the Autódromo Internacional Nelson Piquet.

== 500 cc classification ==
Pos.	Rider	Team	Manufacturer	Time/Retired	Points
1	(Australia) Mick Doohan	Team Repsol Honda	Honda	45:56.850	25
2	(Spain) Àlex Crivillé	Team Repsol Honda	Honda	+0.465	20
3	(Japan) Norifumi Abe	Marlboro Yamaha Roberts	Yamaha	+5.202	16
4	(Spain) Carlos Checa	Fortuna Honda Pons	Honda	+13.020	13
5	(Brazil) Alex Barros	Honda Pileri	Honda	+13.662	11
6	(Italy) Luca Cadalora	Kanemoto Honda	Honda	+14.478	10
7	(France) Jean-Michel Bayle	Marlboro Yamaha Roberts	Yamaha	+16.175	9
8	(Japan) Tadayuki Okada	Team Repsol Honda	Honda	+17.118	8
9	(United States) Scott Russell	Lucky Strike Suzuki	Suzuki	+20.024	7
10	(Spain) Alberto Puig	Fortuna Honda Pons	Yamaha	+38.926	6
11	(Japan) Shinichi Itoh	Team Repsol Honda	Honda	+41.332	5
12	(Italy) Loris Capirossi	Marlboro Yamaha Roberts	Yamaha	+49.364	4
13	(United States) Kenny Roberts Jr.	Marlboro Yamaha Roberts	Yamaha	+1:04.048	3
14	(Spain) Juan Borja	Elf 500 ROC	Elf 500	+1:10.254	2
15	(Italy) Lucio Pedercini	Team Pedercini	ROC Yamaha	+1:16.552	1
16	(France) Frederic Protat	Soverex FP Racing	ROC Yamaha	+1 Lap	
17	(United Kingdom) Chris Walker	Elf 500 ROC	Elf 500	+1 Lap	
18	(Belgium) Laurent Naveau	ELC Lease ROC	ROC Yamaha	+1 Lap	
19	(Belgium) Stephane Mertens	Harris Grand Prix	Harris Yamaha	+1 Lap	
Ret	(Australia) Paul Young	Padgett's Racing Team	Harris Yamaha	Retirement	
Ret	(United Kingdom) Eugene McManus	Millar Racing	Yamaha	Retirement	
Ret	(Japan) Toshiyuki Arakaki	Team Paton	Paton	Retirement	
Ret	(United Kingdom) Jeremy McWilliams	QUB Team Optimum	ROC Yamaha	Retirement	
DNS	(Australia) Daryl Beattie	Lucky Strike Suzuki	Suzuki	Did not start	
DNS	(United States) Chris Taylor	World Championship Motorsports	ROC Yamaha	Did not start	

== 250 cc classification ==
Pos	Rider	Manufacturer	Time/Retired	Points
1	(France) Olivier Jacque	Honda	43:04.546	25
2	(Germany) Ralf Waldmann	Honda	+4.578	20
3	(Germany) Jürgen Fuchs	Honda	+5.497	16
4	(Japan) Tohru Ukawa	Honda	+24.476	13
5	(France) Jean-Philippe Ruggia	Honda	+24.865	11
6	(Italy) Roberto Locatelli	Aprilia	+33.748	10
7	(Spain) Luis d'Antin	Honda	+35.589	9
8	(Spain) Sete Gibernau	Yamaha	+37.501	8
9	(Italy) Luca Boscoscuro	Aprilia	+41.514	7
10	(Japan) Takeshi Tsujimura	Honda	+46.790	6
11	(Italy) Gianluigi Scalvini	Honda	+50.619	5
12	(Argentina) Sebastian Porto	Aprilia	+55.979	4
13	(Netherlands) Jurgen vd Goorbergh	Honda	+1:03.284	3
14	(Switzerland) Olivier Petrucciani	Aprilia	+1:06.316	2
15	(Switzerland) Eskil Suter	Aprilia	+1:07.372	1
16	(Japan) Yasumasa Hatakeyama	Honda	+1:07.416	
17	(Italy) Alessandro Antonello	Aprilia	+1:15.215	
18	(France) Cristophe Cogan	Honda	+1:16.079	
19	(United Kingdom) Marcus Payten	Honda	+1:43.484	
20	(Argentina) Federico Gartner	Honda	+1 Lap	
Ret	(United Kingdom) Jamie Robinson	Aprilia	Retirement	
Ret	(Venezuela) José Barresi	Yamaha	Retirement	
Ret	(France) Christian Boudinot	Aprilia	Retirement	
Ret	(Italy) Cristiano Migliorati	Honda	Retirement	
Ret	(Spain) Fernando Flores	Honda	Retirement	
Ret	(Spain) José Luis Cardoso	Aprilia	Retirement	
Ret	(France) Regis Laconi	Honda	Retirement	
Ret	(Japan) Nobuatsu Aoki	Honda	Retirement	
Ret	(Japan) Osamu Miyazaki	Aprilia	Retirement	
Ret	(Italy) Davide Bulega	Aprilia	Retirement	
Ret	(Italy) Max Biaggi	Aprilia	Retirement	

== 125 cc classification ==
Pos	Rider	Manufacturer	Time/Retired	Points
1	(Japan) Haruchika Aoki	Honda	42:48.875	25
2	(Spain) Emilio Alzamora	Honda	+8.440	20
3	(Japan) Masaki Tokudome	Aprilia	+19.076	16
4	(Spain) Jorge Martinez	Aprilia	+22.674	13
5	(Australia) Garry McCoy	Aprilia	+23.336	11
6	(Japan) Noboru Ueda	Honda	+30.056	10
7	(Italy) Lucio Cecchinello	Honda	+30.206	9
8	(Japan) Youichi Ui	Yamaha	+30.866	8
9	(Italy) Stefano Perugini	Aprilia	+32.286	7
10	(Germany) Dirk Raudies	Honda	+32.614	6
11	(Japan) Kazuto Sakata	Aprilia	+40.166	5
12	(Japan) Yoshiaki Katoh	Yamaha	+41.343	4
13	(Spain) Josep Sarda	Honda	+47.501	3
14	(France) Frederic Petit	Honda	+53.879	2
15	(Czech Republic) Jaroslav Hules	Honda	+57.353	1
16	(Germany) Manfred Geissler	Aprilia	+1:01.912	
17	(Japan) Akira Saito	Honda	+1:02.172	
18	(Italy) Luigi Ancona	Aprilia	+1:17.209	
19	(Italy) Gabriele Debbia	Yamaha	+1:19.526	
Ret	(Italy) Mirko Giansanti	Honda	Retirement	
Ret	(Spain) Herri Torrontegui	Honda	Retirement	
Ret	(Italy) Ivan Goi	Honda	Retirement	
Ret	(Italy) Valentino Rossi	Aprilia	Retirement	
Ret	(Netherlands) Loek Bodelier	Honda	Retirement	
Ret	(Japan) Tomomi Manako	Honda	Retirement	

Previous race: 1996 Catalan Grand Prix	FIM Grand Prix World Championship; 1996 season	Next race: 1996 Australian Grand Prix
Previous race: 1995 Rio de Janeiro Grand Prix	Rio de Janeiro Grand Prix	Next race: 1997 Rio de Janeiro Grand Prix
