= Sebastián Porto =

Argentine motorcycle racer

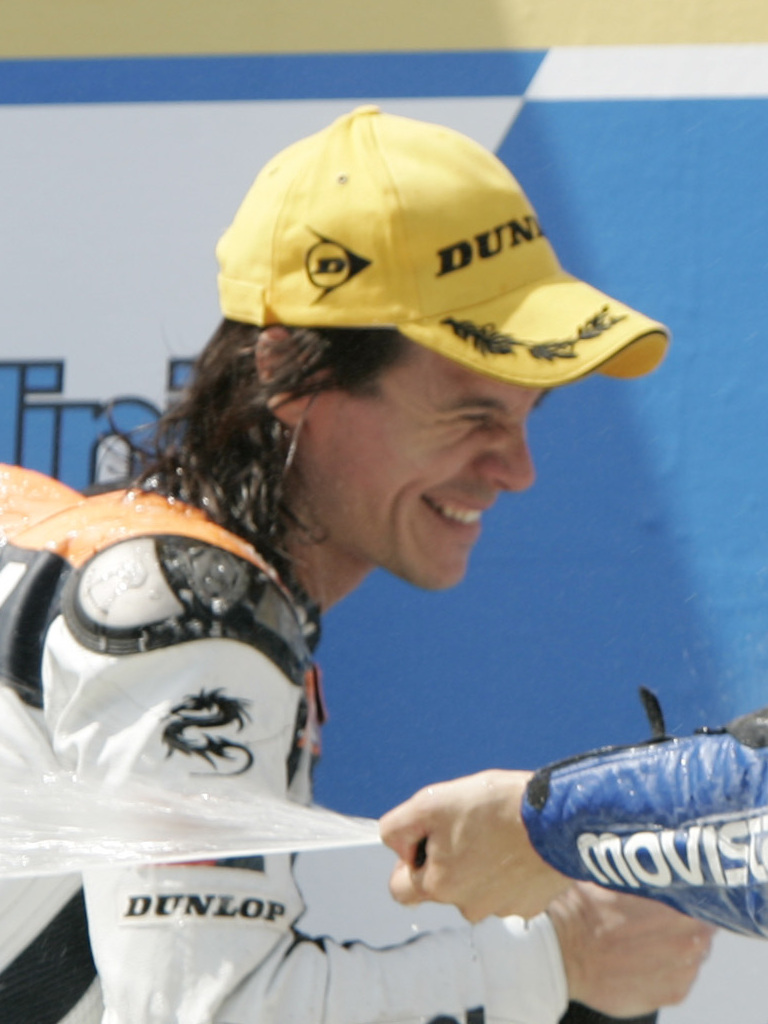
- Porto at Phillip Island in 2005
- Nationality: (Argentina) Argentine
- Born: 12 September 1978 (age 48); Rafaela, Santa Fe Province, Argentine
- Current team: BMW Motorrad Petronas Racing
- Bike number: 12
Motorcycle racing career statistics
Moto2 World Championship
| Active years | 2014 |
| Manufacturers | Kalex |
| 2014 championship position | NC (0 pts) |
Starts / Wins / Podiums / Poles / F. laps / Points; 1 / 0 / 0 / 0 / 0 / 0
250cc World Championship
| Active years | 1995–2006 |
| Manufacturers | Aprilia, Yamaha, Honda |
| Championships | 0 |
| 2006 championship position | 18th (20 pts) |
Starts / Wins / Podiums / Poles / F. laps / Points; 160 / 7 / 19 / 11 / 8 / 1052
125cc World Championship
| Active years | 1994 |
| Manufacturers | Aprilia |
| Championships | 0 |
| 1994 championship position | NC (0 pts) |
Starts / Wins / Podiums / Poles / F. laps / Points; 1 / 0 / 0 / 0 / 0 / 0

Sebastián Porto (born September 12, 1978 as Sebastián Porco) is an Argentine professional Grand Prix motorcycle road racer. He currently races in the Brazilian Moto 1000 GP Championship aboard a BMW S1000RR.

== Career ==
=== Early career ===
Born in Rafaela, Santa Fe Province, Porto started his racing career at the age of 11, competing in the mini-motorcycle local circuit. His first international competition was the 125cc 1994 Argentine Grand Prix, and only two years later he won the 250cc European Championship.

=== 250cc, (1995-2006) ===
The bulk of Porto's racing career was in the 250cc World Championship, starting in 1996 with Aprilia. In 1999, he moved to Yamaha and finished in ninth place in his first two years at the team and in fifth place in the 2002 championship, winning the Brazilian Grand Prix in Rio de Janeiro

Porto moved to the Repsol Aprilia team in 2004 and was championship runner-up, winning five Grands Prix and taking ten podium positions in total. In the 2005 season he claimed the Dutch TT at Assen and also finished second in the Australian Grand Prix, before the Repsol team moved to Honda bikes for 2006.

Rather than the expected switch to MotoGP after the 2006 season, Porto surprised everyone with the news of his retirement from motorcycle competition, claiming he had a hard time adjusting to the 250cc Honda bike, and that he was no longer enjoying his work. He returned to racing in late 2013.

=== 2014, Wildcard Comeback on Moto2 ===
Porto made a one-off wildcard appearance at the Termas Río Hondo Grand Prix entered by Argentina TSR Motorsport riding a Kalex bikes, He finished the race in 23rd place after starting from 32nd on the grid.

== Titles and achievements ==
Being the most visible exponent of motorcycling in Argentina, he has received all 12 Argentine Olimpia Awards for that sport between 1994 and 2005.

- 1992 - Argentine Promotional 100cc Champion
- 1994 - Argentine 250cc Champion
- 1995 - Spanish 250cc Champion (Open Ducados)
- 1996 - European 250cc Champion
- 1999 - 9th place in the 250cc World Championship
- 2000 - Michel Metraux Trophy for best rider on a non-works bike
- 2000 - 9th place in the 250cc World Championship
- 2002 - Brazilian Grand Prix 250cc winner
- 2002 - 5th place in the 250cc World Championship
- 2004 - Five Grand Prix wins (Czech Republic, Australia, Qatar, Netherlands, Italy) and ten total podium finishes
- 2004 - 2nd place in the 250cc World Championship
- 2005 - Dutch TT 250cc winner

== Career statistics ==
=== FIM CEV Moto2 Championship ===
==== Races by year ====
(key) (Races in bold indicate pole position, races in italics indicate fastest lap)

| Year | Bike | 1 | 2 | 3 | 4 | 5 | 6 | 7 | 8 | 9 | 10 | Pos | Pts |
|---|---|---|---|---|---|---|---|---|---|---|---|---|---|
| 2014 | Kalex | **JER**; 4 | ARA1; 5 | ARA2; 4 | CAT; 4 | ALB; 2 | NAV1 | NAV2 | ALG1 | ALG2 | VAL | 7th | 69 |

=== Grand Prix motorcycle racing ===
==== Races by year ====
(key) (Races in bold indicate pole position; races in italics indicate fastest lap)

| Year | Class | Bike | 1 | 2 | 3 | 4 | 5 | 6 | 7 | 8 | 9 | 10 | 11 | 12 | 13 | 14 | 15 | 16 | 17 | 18 | Pos | Pts |
|---|---|---|---|---|---|---|---|---|---|---|---|---|---|---|---|---|---|---|---|---|---|---|
| 1994 | 125cc | Aprilia | AUS | MAL | JPN | ESP | AUT | GER | NED | ITA | FRA | GBR | CZE | USA | ARG; Ret | EUR | | | | | NC | 0 |
| 1995 | 250cc | Aprilia | AUS | MAL | JPN | ESP | GER | ITA | NED | FRA | GBR | CZE | BRA | ARG; 13 | EUR | | | | | | 28th | 3 |
| 1996 | 250cc | Aprilia | MAL; Ret | INA; 9 | JPN; 16 | SPA; 12 | ITA; 16 | FRA; 16 | NED; Ret | GER; 20 | GBR | AUT; 13 | CZE; Ret | IMO; Ret | CAT; 12 | BRA; 12 | AUS; 13 | | | | 19th | 25 |
| 1997 | 250cc | Aprilia | MAL; Ret | JPN; 12 | SPA; Ret | ITA; 10 | AUT; 9 | FRA; 7 | NED; Ret | IMO; Ret | GER; 16 | BRA; 9 | GBR; 9 | CZE; 10 | CAT; 18 | INA; 9 | AUS; 9 | | | | 11th | 60 |
| 1998 | 250cc | Aprilia | JPN; Ret | MAL; 9 | SPA; Ret | ITA; Ret | FRA; Ret | MAD; Ret | NED; 6 | GBR; DNS | GER; Ret | CZE; Ret | IMO; Ret | CAT; Ret | AUS; Ret | ARG; Ret | | | | | 22nd | 17 |
| 1999 | 250cc | Yamaha | MAL; 15 | JPN; 17 | SPA; 12 | FRA; 7 | ITA; 9 | CAT; 9 | NED; 12 | GBR; Ret | GER; 7 | CZE; Ret | IMO; 9 | VAL; 6 | AUS; 9 | RSA; 6 | BRA; 6 | ARG; 4 | | | 9th | 98 |
| 2000 | 250cc | Yamaha | RSA; 8 | MAL; 8 | JPN; 12 | SPA; 9 | FRA; 10 | ITA; Ret | CAT; Ret | NED; 7 | GBR; 11 | GER; 9 | CZE; 8 | POR; Ret | VAL; 8 | BRA; 8 | PAC; Ret | AUS; 11 | | | 9th | 83 |
| 2001 | 250cc | Yamaha | JPN; 9 | RSA; 7 | SPA; Ret | FRA; 8 | ITA; Ret | CAT; 14 | NED; 14 | GBR; Ret | GER; Ret | CZE; 8 | POR; Ret | VAL; 13 | PAC; Ret | AUS; Ret | MAL; Ret | BRA; Ret | | | 16th | 39 |
| 2002 | 250cc | Yamaha | JPN; 5 | RSA; 8 | SPA; 7 | FRA; 8 | ITA; 7 | CAT; Ret | NED; 4 | GBR; Ret | GER; 3 | CZE; 2 | **POR**; 3 | BRA; 1 | PAC; 8 | MAL; 4 | AUS; 3 | VAL; Ret | | | 5th | 172 |
| 2003 | 250cc | Honda | JPN; 4 | RSA; 4 | SPA; 6 | FRA; Ret | ITA; 8 | CAT; 7 | NED; 5 | GBR; 6 | **GER**; 4 | CZE; 5 | POR; 5 | BRA; Ret | PAC; Ret | MAL; 8 | AUS; Ret | VAL; 6 | | | 8th | 127 |
| 2004 | 250cc | Aprilia | RSA; 3 | **SPA**; 7 | FRA; Ret | **ITA**; 1 | CAT; 4 | **NED**; 1 | **BRA**; Ret | **GER**; 2 | GBR; 2 | **CZE**; 1 | POR; 2 | JPN; 4 | **QAT**; 1 | **MAL**; 2 | **AUS**; 1 | VAL; Ret | | | **2nd** | **256** |
| 2005 | 250cc | Aprilia | SPA; 2 | POR; 9 | CHN; 5 | FRA; Ret | ITA; 5 | CAT; Ret | NED; 1 | GBR; 5 | GER; 5 | CZE; 7 | JPN; Ret | MAL; 3 | QAT; 5 | AUS; 2 | TUR; Ret | VAL | | | 6th | 152 |
| 2006 | 250cc | Honda | SPA; Ret | QAT; 7 | TUR; 10 | CHN; Ret | FRA; 14 | ITA; 13 | CAT | NED | GBR | GER | USA | CZE | MAL | AUS | JPN | POR | VAL | | 18th | 20 |
| 2014 | Moto2 | Kalex | QAT | AME | ARG; 23 | SPA | FRA | ITA | CAT | NED | GER | INP | CZE | GBR | RSM | ARA | JPN | AUS | MAL | VAL | NC | 0 |
