= 1997 Dutch TT =

(Netherlands) 1997 Dutch Grand Prix
Race details
- Race 7 of 15 races in the 1997 Grand Prix motorcycle racing season
- Date: 28 June 1997
- Official name: Lucky Strike Dutch Grand Prix
- Location: TT Circuit Assen
- Course: Permanent racing facility; 6.049 km (3.759 mi)

500cc
Pole position
- Rider: (Australia) Mick Doohan
- Time: 2:02.512
Fastest lap
- Rider: (Spain) Carlos Checa
- Time: 2:03.363
Podium
- First: (Australia) Mick Doohan
- Second: (Spain) Carlos Checa
- Third: (Italy) Doriano Romboni

250cc
Pole position
- Rider: (France) Olivier Jacque
- Time: 2:05.190
Fastest lap
- Rider: (France) Olivier Jacque
- Time: 2:06.047
Podium
- First: (Japan) Tetsuya Harada
- Second: (Germany) Ralf Waldmann
- Third: (Italy) Loris Capirossi

125cc
Pole position
- Rider: (Italy) Valentino Rossi
- Time: 2:15.085
Fastest lap
- Rider: (Japan) Tomomi Manako
- Time: 2:15.049
Podium
- First: (Italy) Valentino Rossi
- Second: (Japan) Tomomi Manako
- Third: (Japan) Kazuto Sakata

The 1997 Dutch TT was the seventh round of the 1997 Grand Prix motorcycle racing season. It took place on 28 June 1997 at the TT Circuit Assen located in Assen, Netherlands.

== 500 cc classification ==
Pos.	Rider	Team	Manufacturer	Time/Retired	Points
1	(Australia) Mick Doohan	Repsol YPF Honda Team	Honda	43:37.954	25
2	(Spain) Carlos Checa	Movistar Honda Pons	Honda	+10.560	20
3	(Italy) Doriano Romboni	IP Aprilia Racing Team	Aprilia	+18.282	16
4	(Japan) Nobuatsu Aoki	Rheos Elf FCC TS	Honda	+24.048	13
5	(Spain) Alberto Puig	Movistar Honda Pons	Honda	+28.105	11
6	(Brazil) Alex Barros	Honda Gresini	Honda	+38.219	10
7	(Australia) Daryl Beattie	Lucky Strike Suzuki	Suzuki	+43.217	9
8	(United States) Kenny Roberts Jr.	Marlboro Team Roberts	Modenas KR3	+47.525	8
9	(Germany) Jürgen Fuchs	Elf 500 ROC	Elf 500	+48.724	7
10	(Japan) Norifumi Abe	Yamaha Team Rainey	Yamaha	+49.574	6
11	(France) Bernard Garcia	Team Tecmas	Honda	+1:04.431	5
12	(Japan) Tadayuki Okada	Repsol YPF Honda Team	Honda	+1:05.807	4
13	(Australia) Anthony Gobert	Lucky Strike Suzuki	Suzuki	+1:08.853	3
14	(Australia) Troy Corser	Red Bull Yamaha WCM	Yamaha	+1:09.565	2
15	(Spain) Juan Borja	Elf 500 ROC	Elf 500	+1:53.073	1
16	(Belgium) Laurent Naveau	Millet Racing	ROC Yamaha	+1 Lap	
17	(France) Frederic Protat	Soverex FP Racing	Honda	+1 Lap	
18	(Italy) Lucio Pedercini	Team Pedercini	ROC Yamaha	+1 Lap	
19	(Spain) Sete Gibernau	Yamaha Team Rainey	Yamaha	+1 Lap	
Ret	(Italy) Luca Cadalora	Red Bull Yamaha WCM	Yamaha	Retirement	
Ret	(Netherlands) Jurgen van den Goorbergh	Team Millar MQP	Honda	Retirement	
Ret	(France) Jean-Michel Bayle	Marlboro Team Roberts	Modenas KR3	Retirement	
Ret	(Japan) Takuma Aoki	Repsol Honda	Honda	Retirement	

== 250 cc classification ==
Pos	Rider	Manufacturer	Time/Retired	Points
1	(Japan) Tetsuya Harada	Aprilia	38:09.016	25
2	(Germany) Ralf Waldmann	Honda	+0.238	20
3	(Italy) Loris Capirossi	Aprilia	+12.506	16
4	(Japan) Tohru Ukawa	Honda	+30.663	13
5	(Italy) Stefano Perugini	Aprilia	+31.576	11
6	(Japan) Takeshi Tsujimura	TSR-Honda	+35.742	10
7	(France) William Costes	Honda	+56.803	9
8	(Japan) Osamu Miyazaki	Yamaha	+56.962	8
9	(United Kingdom) Jeremy McWilliams	Honda	+57.360	7
10	(Spain) Luis d'Antin	Yamaha	+1:07.463	6
11	(Italy) Franco Battaini	Yamaha	+1:18.287	5
12	(Switzerland) Oliver Petrucciani	Aprilia	+1:20.436	4
13	(Italy) Cristiano Migliorati	Honda	+1:20.744	3
14	(Netherlands) Maurice Bolwerk	Honda	+2:13.335	2
15	(Spain) Eustaquio Gavira	Aprilia	+2:23.965	1
16	(Netherlands) Gerard Rike	Honda	+1 Lap	
17	(Netherlands) Jaap Hoogeveen	Yamaha	+1 Lap	
18	(Netherlands) Henk Van De Lagemaat	Honda	+1 Lap	
19	(Netherlands) Gert Pieper	Honda	+1 Lap	
Ret	(France) Olivier Jacque	Honda	Retirement	
Ret	(Japan) Haruchika Aoki	Honda	Retirement	
Ret	(Netherlands) Andre Romein	Honda	Retirement	
Ret	(Italy) Giuseppe Fiorillo	Aprilia	Retirement	
Ret	(United Kingdom) Jamie Robinson	Suzuki	Retirement	
Ret	(Spain) José Luis Cardoso	Yamaha	Retirement	
Ret	(Argentina) Sebastian Porto	Aprilia	Retirement	
Ret	(Japan) Noriyasu Numata	Suzuki	Retirement	
Ret	(Spain) Emilio Alzamora	Honda	Retirement	
Ret	(Italy) Luca Boscoscuro	Honda	Retirement	
Ret	(Spain) Idalio Gavira	Aprilia	Retirement	
DSQ	(Italy) Max Biaggi	Honda	Disqualified	

== 125 cc classification ==
Pos	Rider	Manufacturer	Time/Retired	Points
1	(Italy) Valentino Rossi	Aprilia	38:50.246	25
2	(Japan) Tomomi Manako	Honda	+0.100	20
3	(Japan) Kazuto Sakata	Aprilia	+0.284	16
4	(Japan) Noboru Ueda	Honda	+0.512	13
5	(Japan) Youichi Ui	Yamaha	+0.871	11
6	(Spain) Jorge Martinez	Aprilia	+1.568	10
7	(Japan) Masaki Tokudome	Aprilia	+1.596	9
8	(Italy) Roberto Locatelli	Honda	+1.636	8
9	(France) Frederic Petit	Honda	+26.348	7
10	(Japan) Masao Azuma	Honda	+30.715	6
11	(Czech Republic) Jaroslav Hules	Honda	+30.819	5
12	(Germany) Manfred Geissler	Honda	+39.769	4
13	(Italy) Gianluigi Scalvini	Honda	+39.042	3
14	(Spain) Enrique Maturana	Yamaha	+39.347	2
15	(Italy) Ivan Goi	Aprilia	+46.464	1
16	(Spain) Angel Nieto Jr	Aprilia	+1:11.667	
17	(Germany) Steve Jenkner	Aprilia	+1:37.799	
18	(Netherlands) Rob Filart	Honda	+1:38.070	
19	(Netherlands) Hans Koopman	Honda	+2:10.164	
Ret	(Netherlands) Arno Visscher	Aprilia	Retirement	
Ret	(Japan) Yoshiaki Katoh	Yamaha	Retirement	
Ret	(Netherlands) Jarno Janssen	Honda	Retirement	
Ret	(Spain) Josep Sarda	Honda	Retirement	
Ret	(Germany) Peter Öttl	Aprilia	Retirement	
Ret	(Italy) Gino Borsoi	Yamaha	Retirement	
Ret	(Italy) Mirko Giansanti	Honda	Retirement	
Ret	(Germany) Dirk Raudies	Honda	Retirement	
Ret	(Australia) Garry McCoy	Aprilia	Retirement	

Previous race: 1997 French Grand Prix	FIM Grand Prix World Championship; 1997 season	Next race: 1997 City of Imola Grand Prix
Previous race: 1996 Dutch TT	Dutch TT	Next race: 1998 Dutch TT
