= 1996 Spanish motorcycle Grand Prix =

(Spain) 1996 Spanish Grand Prix
Race details
- Race 4 of 15 races in the 1996 Grand Prix motorcycle racing season
- Date: 12 May 1996
- Official name: Gran Premio Lucky Strike de España
- Location: Circuito de Jerez
- Course: Permanent racing facility; 4.423 km (2.748 mi)

500cc
Pole position
- Rider: (Australia) Mick Doohan
- Time: 1:43.866
Fastest lap
- Rider: (Italy) Luca Cadalora
- Time: 1:44.812
Podium
- First: (Australia) Mick Doohan
- Second: (Italy) Luca Cadalora
- Third: (Japan) Tadayuki Okada

250cc
Pole position
- Rider: (Italy) Max Biaggi
- Time: 1:45.015
Fastest lap
- Rider: (Italy) Max Biaggi
- Time: 1:45.270
Podium
- First: (Italy) Max Biaggi
- Second: (Japan) Tetsuya Harada
- Third: (Germany) Ralf Waldmann

125cc
Pole position
- Rider: (Spain) Jorge Martínez
- Time: 1:49.945
Fastest lap
- Rider: (Japan) Kazuto Sakata
- Time: 1:49.400
Podium
- First: (Japan) Haruchika Aoki
- Second: (Spain) Emilio Alzamora
- Third: (Japan) Noboru Ueda

The 1996 Spanish motorcycle Grand Prix was the fourth round of the 1996 Grand Prix motorcycle racing season. It took place on 12 May 1996 at the Circuito Permanente de Jerez.

== 500cc race report ==
This race was most notable for the battle between Mick Doohan and Àlex Crivillé, the Spanish fans who invaded the track due to a misunderstanding and Crivillé's highside at the final corner, allowing Doohan to win the race.

Mick Doohan took the pole position on Saturday, before his Repsol Honda teammates Àlex Crivillé and Tadayuki Okada. Italian Doriano Romboni put the Aprilia in fourth place. American Scott Russell would not start the race due to an injury he had sustained at one of the practice sessions.

As the lights went out, Okada had an abysmal start, dropping back into the field. Crivillé overtakes Doohan before the Curva Expo '92 (Turn 1) and it looks to be the Spaniard who will lead, but Luca Cadalora - who had a very good start - shot past from sixth to take the lead instead on the opening lap. Alex Barros also moved up a few places and was fourth at the Curva Expo '92. However, Crivillé retakes the lead at the short straight before the Curva Michelin (Turn 2), Barros doing likewise on Doohan for third place. Romboni has lost a place and is now fifth. At the Curva Sito Pons (Turn 5), Romboni overtakes Doohan on the outside, making full use of a poor exit he had out of the unnamed, fast left handed Turn 4. At the back straight, multiple people try to overtake at the back, with some running wide at the entrance to the Curva Dry Sac (Turn 6). Cadalora at the front does so as well, grabbing back the lead from Crivillé at the entrance of said corner. Romboni, trying to overtake Barros, ran wide and lost fourth place to Doohan instead at the exit. Daryl Beattie meanwhile, fancied an attempt on Doohan around the outside in sixth, but chose to stay behind the fellow Australian for the time being. Doohan tried to line up a pass at the Curva Ducados (Turn 13, now called Curva Lorenzo) but Barros defended his line, not allowing the Australian to pass.

On lap two, the top six consists out of Cadalora, Crivillé, Barros, Doohan, Beattie and Romboni. Crivillé tried to pass Cadalora at the Curva Sito Pons, but wasn't close enough and slotted back behind the Italian. Beattie meanwhile ran wide at the Curva Dry Sac, almost clipping the rear tyre of Doohan and losing fifth as a result. Romboni runs wide as well, but only goes slightly off track and doesn't lose as many positions as Beattie. Norick Abe has also crashed out, highsighting in the middle of the Dry Sac corner, lying in pain in the gravel. He slowly gets up with help from the marshalls - still in pain as he holds his chest - with other marshalls trying to recover his Marlboro Yamaha bike. In the meantime, Doohan overtook Barros for third place as well.

Lap three and the top six has now become the top four: Cadalora, Crivillé, Doohan and Barros. Okada is a relatively distant fifth, as is Jean-Michel Bayle in sixth. Crivillé takes over at the front by passing Cadalora at the Curva Sito Pons, with Cadalora retaking the lead at the Curva Dry Sac, going up the inside of the Spaniard. Crivillé then passes Cadalora again at the Curva Ducados, with Doohan closing in and Barros losing some ground to the top three. Beattie meanwhile has crashed out of contention at the Curva Peluqui (Turn 10), limping away from his stricken bike as a result

Lap four has begun and Okada is now all over the back of Barros. Crivillé is now opening up a gap to a fading Cadalora, who is being harassed by Doohan at the first sector, as is Barros by Okada. Beattie's bike, still in the gravel, is now starting to catch fire and Okada has managed to take fourth from Barros on the outside whilst exiting the Curva Sito Pons. The crowd starts to cheer on Crivillé at the Curva Ángel Nieto (Turn 9) and the Curva Peluqui as he now leads the race. A marshall waves the yellow flag as the top four passes the corner, the marshalls extinguishing Beattie's Lucky Strike Suzuki in the back.

Lap five and Barros has now lost touch with the top four, consisting out of Crivillé, Cadalora, Doohan and Okada. The crowd is still cheering on the Spaniard at the front, with some even lighting some fireworks in the background. The yellow flag is still being waved at the Peluqui corner and Okada has now closed the gap to Doohan. No overtakes happened at the front.

On lap six, Crivillé starts to increase the gap to Cadalora, with Cadalora doing likewise to Doohan. No overtakes took place, but Doohan has not yet lost touch of Cadalora.

Lap seven and Kenny Roberts Jr. is putting on the pressure on teammate Bayle. Criville is still extending his gap to Cadalora, with Doohan inching ever closer. He tries to overtake Cadalora at the straight between the Curva Sito Pons and the Curva Dry Sac with a higher top speed, but fails and stays behind instead. At this stage, Roberts Jr. has passed Bayle for sixth, with Loris Capirossi joining the three-way Marlboro Yamaha battle with Roberts Jr. and Bayle. Further back is another trio, consisting out of Alberto Puig, Carlos Checa and Shinichi Ito in ninth, tenth and eleventh position. Roberts Jr. meanwhile has overtaken Barros for fifth between the Curva Ángel Nieto and the Curva Peluqui.

Before lap eight, Doohan passed Cadalora for second before the start/finish straight, with the Italian retaking the position at the entrance of the Curva Expo '92. However, this move caused Cadalora to run slightly wide at the exit and gave the Australian the chance to dive down the inside at the Curva Michelin. As he does so, he runs out of room and taps the rear tyre of Cadalora, causing him to lose his composure slightly, but neither of the riders fall or run wide from it as a result. Doohan's move fails, making him stay behind Cadalora as they approach Turn 3. Doohan then finally passed Cadalora in between the unnamed Turn 4 and the Curva Dry Sac, moving him up to second.

Lap nine and Cadalora is trying to follow Mick Doohan, with Okada still waiting for the time to strike in fourth place. Roberts Jr. is pulling away from Barros, with Capirossi - who passed Bayle - behind him in seventh spot. Crivillé had a slight moment coming out of the Curva Ducados, but doesn't lose any positions or time from it.

On lap ten, Doohan has now pulled a significant gap to Cadalora, who's still under pressure from Okada. Capirossi - who has passed Barros on the previous lap - is now pulling a gap to him and chasing after Roberts Jr.. Crivillé brakes hard and has slight difficulties breaking for the Curva Dry Sac, causing him to have a slight moment upon entry. Going into the Curva Ducados, Okada then overtakes Cadalora's Kanemoto Honda for third.

Lap eleven and Doohan is slowly reeling in the leading Spaniard, who is still being cheered on by the crowd. Cadalora meanwhile retakes third from Okada at the start/finish straight, finalising the pass going into the Curva Expo '92. Okada tries again by going up the inside of Cadalora at the Curva Sito Pons, but the Japanese gets overtaken again by Cadalora at the straight before the Curva Dry Sac.

On lap twelve, Cadalora is now slowly opening up a small gap to Okada, with Puig now in seventh position after he overtook Bayle. Fireworks are once again heard as Crivillé passes the Curva Peluqui and the Curva Àlex Crivillé (Turn 11). No overtakes happened at the front.

Lap thirteen and Cadalora now has a significant gap to Doohan, making it a two-way battle for the lead and the win. Further back, Puig is slowly closing the gap on sixth place Capirossi. Still no overtakes at the front.

On lap fourteen, Doohan has now wholly closed the gap to Crivillé and is all over the back of the Spaniard, but still hasn't made a move on the leader.

As lap fifteen begins, Cadalora is now slowly closing the gap on the two frontrunners again, with Okada dropping off on the pace. Further back, Capirossi is also closing in on Roberts Jr for fifth place.

Lap sixteen and the Australian is still shadowing Crivillé, with Cadalora closing in on the two still.

On lap seventeen, Cadalora has caught the two frontrunners, making it a three-way battle for victory again. Doohan has a look at the straight before the Curva Dry Sac, but thinks better of it and stays behind for now.

Lap eighteen and still no overtakes at the front. The top six is still the same as well (Crivillé, Doohan, Cadalora, Okada, Roberts Jr. and Capirossi). Crivillé exits the Curva Sito Pons slightly wider than usual, allowing Doohan to close up more than usual at the straight before the Curva Dry Sac. He has another look, but does not overtake once more. Capirossi meanwhile has overtaken Roberts Jr. before the straight of the Sito Pons corner, moving him up to fifth, with Puig also closing the gap to the two in front of him as well.

On lap nineteen, Doohan once again closes up on his Repsol Honda teammate and tries to get side-by-side with Criville at the Curva Dry Sac, with Crivillé denying him once again. Doohan has another look at the Curva Ducados, but is forced to slot back behind the Spaniard as he outbreaks him.

Lap twenty and Cadalora is starting to lose some ground to the top two once more. Doohan does not try any moves on Crivillé this time.

Before lap twenty-one begins, Crivillé looks back to see the gap to his Australian teammate, then opens up a slight gap to him. A handful of Spanish fans now started to get past the fences to separate them from the track and were waving flags at the trackside where the tyre barriers are.

On lap twenty-two, Cadalora is once again slowly closing in on the two, with Doohan still shadowing Crivillé.

Lap twenty-three and the Spanish fans started to cheer ever louder as Crivillé passes the Curva Ángel Nieto, Curva Peluqui and Curva Àlex Crivillé corners.

On lap twenty-four, more and more fans have broken through the fences and are now dangerously sitting on the trackside wall, looking on as Crivillé still leads the trio. As they come down to the Curva Ángel Nieto, Curva Peluqui and Curva Àlex Crivillé corners, the fans cheer Crivillé on loudly, jumping the fence and standing in the gravel as they do so.

On the penultimate lap, Crivillé continued to lead Doohan, who had closed to within a short distance of his rear tyre. More spectators crossed the barriers near the Curva Ángel Nieto, Curva Peluqui and Curva Àlex Crivillé, with some gathering beside the track and in the gravel traps.

Going into lap twenty-six - the final lap - Crivillé is still leading Doohan, who has found no way past his teammate. However, in a complete lack of security by track officials and a mistake of the Spanish announcer already concluding the race had finished a lap too early, many fans had jumped the fence and were lining the Curva Ángel Nieto, Curva Peluqui and Curva Àlex Crivillé corners - jumping over the low wall and onto the grass and gravel at the side of the circuit and causing a track invasion - to cheer Crivillé home. The Spaniard was forced to slow slightly through the crowd which allowed Doohan to close up (the gap was less than a second between them at the start of the final lap). As the duo reached the final corner - the Curva Ducados - Doohan dived down the inside of Crivillé to take the lead. Seeking to regain the advantage, Crivillé throttled too early in the hairpin leading onto the pit straight, causing him to high-side over his bike, ending in the gravel trap and failing to finish the race. He looks on, angrily puts up his hands in the air, then shakes his head in disbelief as Doohan crosses the line to win the race - his second of the season. This sudden crash also gifted Cadalora second and Okada third. Further back, Capirossi finishes in fourth, Puig in fifth and Roberts Jr. in sixth place.

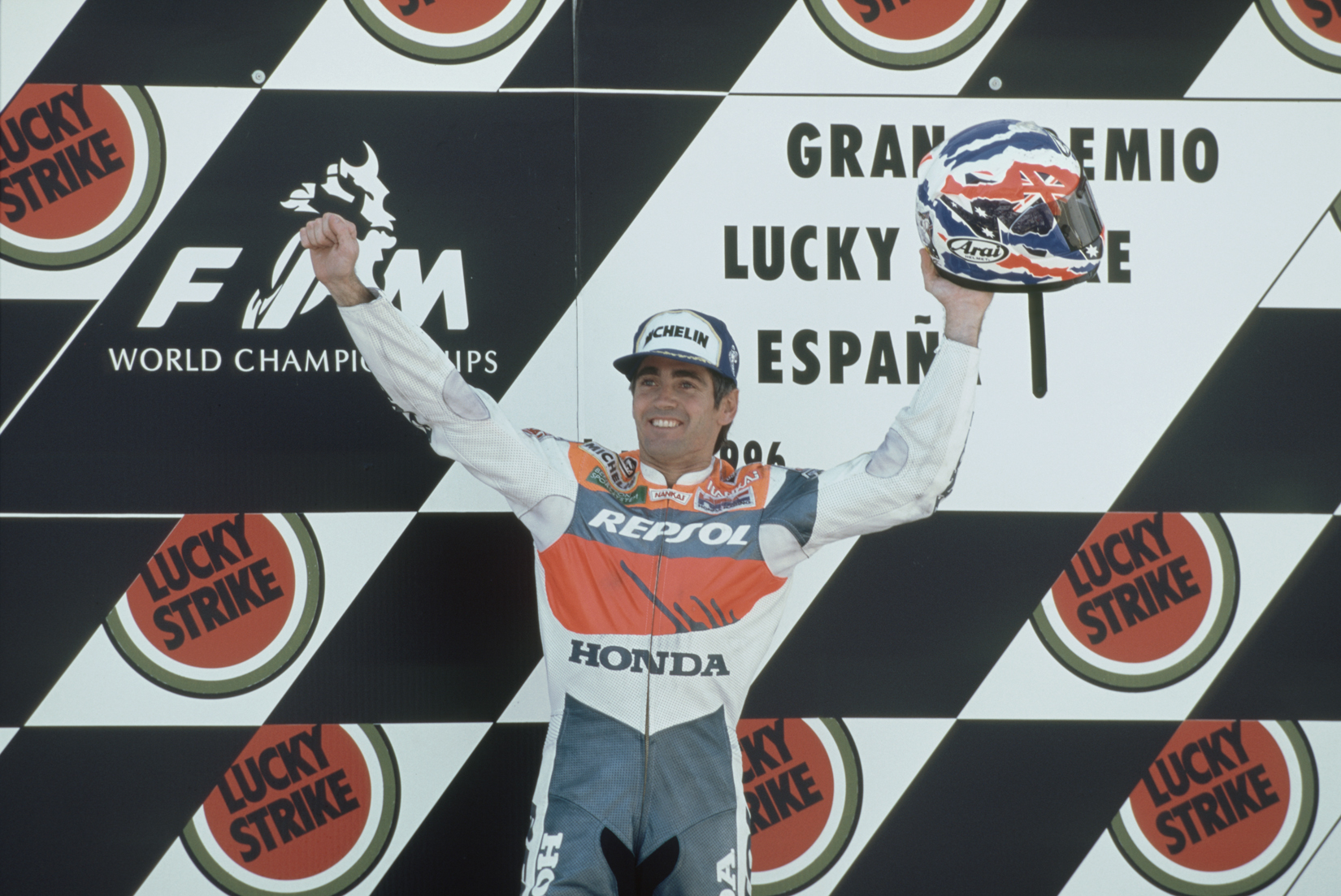
Mick Doohan, celebrating on the podium after winning the race. He overtook Crivillé at the final turn, causing him to crash out after a track invasion of Spanish fans caused him to slow down enough for Doohan to pass him.

Crivillé managed to get up on his own and walk away in anger with the Spanish fans being confused at what just happened. He talks to some security about the situation and as the drivers do the parade lap back to parc fermé, many more fans now swarm the track, with Doohan forced to go via the grass at the Curva Ángel Nieto, Curva Peluqui and Curva Àlex Criville section as a portion of the fans angrily went after him. Another portion ran up to Puig - the highest-finishing Spaniard after Crivillé went out - to rejoice with him. After the fans slowly started to understand what happened, they start to boo Doohan, who had arrived back to parc fermé and is talking to his team about the incident. The marshalls meanwhile load the stricken bike of Crivillé onto the loader to bring it back to the pits.

As the riders got on the podium, applause and some booing was heard. The crowd then shouts "Crivillé! Crivillé!" as they wanted him to win the race. As the trophies get handed, the crowd boo Doohan when he receives his, then proceed to cheer when Cadalora receives his. The Italian then shakes hands with Doohan and Okada whilst on the podium.

As the Australian national anthem plays, fans whistle at Doohan and continue to shout Crivillé's name. The trio then sprays the champagne as he then gets a mild applause.

Doohan's win increased his lead in the world championship. He leads with 71 points, with Cadalora in second place with 55 points and Barros in third with 48 points.

Commenting about Crivillé's form during the race, Doohan said this:

"Alex was riding on a high. I knew that if I took him, he'd be back again and he would close the gap."

== 500 cc classification ==
Pos.	Rider	Team	Manufacturer	Time/Retired	Grid	Points
1	(Australia) Mick Doohan	Team Repsol Honda	Honda	47:28.064	1	25
2	(Italy) Luca Cadalora	Kanemoto Honda	Honda	+2.677	6	20
3	(Japan) Tadayuki Okada	Team Repsol Honda	Honda	+14.644	3	16
4	(Italy) Loris Capirossi	Marlboro Yamaha Roberts	Yamaha	+17.030	8	13
5	(Spain) Alberto Puig	Fortuna Honda Pons	Honda	+21.534	9	11
6	(United States) Kenny Roberts Jr.	Marlboro Yamaha Roberts	Yamaha	+21.814	10	10
7	(France) Jean-Michel Bayle	Marlboro Yamaha Roberts	Yamaha	+26.312	7	9
8	(Brazil) Alex Barros	Honda Pileri	Honda	+38.120	12	8
9	(Japan) Shinichi Itoh	Team Repsol Honda	Honda	+38.444	11	7
10	(Spain) Carlos Checa	Fortuna Honda Pons	Honda	+49.478	16	6
11	(Spain) Juan Borja	Elf 500 ROC	Elf 500	+59.336	13	5
12	(United Kingdom) James Haydon	World Championship Motorsports	ROC Yamaha	+1:08.537	21	4
13	(France) Frederic Protat	Soverex FP Racing	ROC Yamaha	+1:09.082	19	3
14	(United Kingdom) Jeremy McWilliams	QUB Team Optimum	ROC Yamaha	+1:09.509	18	2
15	(United Kingdom) Sean Emmett	Harris Grand Prix	Harris Yamaha	+1:21.050	20	1
16	(United Kingdom) Eugene McManus	Millar Racing	Yamaha	+1:43.550	23	
17	(Japan) Toshiyuki Arakaki	Padgett's Racing Team	Yamaha	+1 Lap	25	
18	(France) Jean Pierre Jeandat	Team Paton	Paton	+1 Lap	24	
19	(Switzerland) Adrien Bosshard	Elf 500 ROC	Elf 500	+1 Lap	22	
20	(Italy) Lucio Pedercini	Team Pedercini	ROC Yamaha	+1 Lap	17	
Ret	(Japan) Norifumi Abe	Marlboro Yamaha Roberts	Yamaha	Retirement	14	
Ret	(Italy) Doriano Romboni	IP Aprilia Racing Team	Aprilia	Retirement	4	
Ret	(Spain) Àlex Crivillé	Team Repsol Honda	Honda	Retirement	2	
Ret	(Australia) Daryl Beattie	Lucky Strike Suzuki	Suzuki	Retirement	5	
DNS	(United States) Scott Russell	Lucky Strike Suzuki	Suzuki	Did not start	15	

== 250 cc classification ==
Pos	Rider	Manufacturer	Time/Retired	Points
1	(Italy) Max Biaggi	Aprilia	46:06.154	25
2	(Japan) Tetsuya Harada	Yamaha	+12.238	20
3	(Germany) Ralf Waldmann	Honda	+15.476	16
4	(Germany) Jürgen Fuchs	Honda	+16.222	13
5	(Japan) Tohru Ukawa	Honda	+29.329	11
6	(Spain) Luis d'Antin	Honda	+29.508	10
7	(France) Olivier Jacque	Honda	+37.638	9
8	(France) Jean-Philippe Ruggia	Honda	+44.866	8
9	(United Kingdom) Jamie Robinson	Aprilia	+50.899	7
10	(Italy) Luca Boscoscuro	Aprilia	+52.203	6
11	(Spain) Sete Gibernau	Honda	+1:06.864	5
12	(Argentina) Sebastian Porto	Aprilia	+1:16.662	4
13	(Italy) Cristiano Migliorati	Honda	+1:19.461	3
14	(Japan) Takeshi Tsujimura	Honda	+1:21.196	2
15	(Japan) Osamu Miyazaki	Aprilia	+1:21.585	1
16	(Italy) Davide Bulega	Aprilia	+1:31.868	
17	(Italy) Massimo Ottobre	Aprilia	+1:33.071	
18	(Japan) Yasumasa Hatakeyama	Honda	+1:33.122	
19	(Italy) Gianluigi Scalvini	Honda	+2 Laps	
Ret	(Japan) Haruchika Aoki	Honda	Retirement	
Ret	(Spain) Vicente Esparragoso	Honda	Retirement	
Ret	(France) Cristophe Cogan	Honda	Retirement	
Ret	(Spain) Javier Marsella	Honda	Retirement	
Ret	(Netherlands) Jurgen vd Goorbergh	Honda	Retirement	
Ret	(Italy) Roberto Locatelli	Aprilia	Retirement	
Ret	(Venezuela) José Barresi	Yamaha	Retirement	
Ret	(France) Christian Boudinot	Aprilia	Retirement	
Ret	(Switzerland) Eskil Suter	Aprilia	Retirement	
Ret	(France) Regis Laconi	Honda	Retirement	
Ret	(Spain) Miguel Tey	Honda	Retirement	
Ret	(Switzerland) Olivier Petrucciani	Aprilia	Retirement	

== 125 cc classification ==
Pos	Rider	Manufacturer	Time/Retired	Points
1	(Japan) Haruchika Aoki	Honda	42:34.978	25
2	(Spain) Emilio Alzamora	Honda	+0.025	20
3	(Japan) Noboru Ueda	Honda	+0.116	16
4	(Italy) Valentino Rossi	Aprilia	+0.162	13
5	(Japan) Kazuto Sakata	Aprilia	+0.224	11
6	(Japan) Masaki Tokudome	Aprilia	+3.096	10
7	(Italy) Stefano Perugini	Aprilia	+3.326	9
8	(Japan) Tomomi Manako	Honda	+13.464	8
9	(Japan) Yoshiaki Katoh	Yamaha	+13.546	7
10	(Italy) Ivan Goi	Honda	+15.430	6
11	(Germany) Peter Öttl	Aprilia	+15.943	5
12	(Germany) Manfred Geissler	Aprilia	+23.611	4
13	(Germany) Dirk Raudies	Honda	+26.878	3
14	(United Kingdom) Darren Barton	Aprilia	+32.756	2
15	(Spain) José Antonio Ramirez	Yamaha	+32.893	1
16	(Spain) Josep Sarda	Honda	+43.570	
17	(Japan) Youichi Ui	Yamaha	+53.858	
18	(France) Frederic Petit	Honda	+59.656	
19	(Italy) Andrea Ballerini	Aprilia	+59.929	
20	(Spain) Herri Torrontegui	Honda	+1:03.994	
21	(Netherlands) Loek Bodelier	Honda	+1:04.857	
22	(Czech Republic) Jaroslav Hules	Honda	+1:07.144	
23	(Italy) Gabriele Debbia	Yamaha	+1:10.669	
24	(Japan) Akira Saito	Honda	+1:27.562	
Ret	(Spain) David García	Honda	Retirement	
Ret	(Spain) Alvaro Molina	Honda	Retirement	
Ret	(Spain) Angel Nieto Jr	Aprilia	Retirement	
Ret	(Spain) Enrique Maturana	Yamaha	Retirement	
Ret	(Australia) Garry McCoy	Aprilia	Retirement	
Ret	(Italy) Stefano Cruciani	Aprilia	Retirement	
Ret	(Italy) Lucio Cecchinello	Honda	Retirement	
Ret	(Spain) Jorge Martinez	Aprilia	Retirement	

Previous race: 1996 Japanese Grand Prix	FIM Grand Prix World Championship; 1996 season	Next race: 1996 Italian Grand Prix
Previous race: 1995 Spanish Grand Prix	Spanish Grand Prix	Next race: 1997 Spanish Grand Prix
