= Yoshiaki Katoh =

Japanese motorcycle racer born 1965

- Born: August 26, 1965 (age 61); Kyoto, Japan
Motorcycle racing career statistics
Grand Prix motorcycle racing
Active years	1991 - 1992, 1994 - 1998
First race	1994 125 cc Australian Grand Prix
Last race	1998 125 cc Argentine Grand Prix
Team	Team Yamaha Kurz Team Aspar Cepsa Team Semprucci
1998 championship position	16
Starts / Wins / Podiums / Poles / F. laps / Points; 64 / 0 / 1 / 0 / 0 / 243

Yoshiaki Katoh (加藤義昌, Katō Yoshiaki; born 26 August, 1965 in Kyoto) is a Japanese former motorcycle racer, who competed in the Grand Prix motorcycle championships between 1991 and 1998.

== Biography ==
Katoh's first appearance at the World Championship was during the 1991 Grand Prix motorcycle racing season, where he competed riding a Yamaha in the 250 cc class. In 1993, he won the All Japan Road Race Championship title in the 125cc class. A year later, he competed in the 1994 Grand Prix motorcycle racing season in the same class, this time for the Aspar Cepsa team with better results, finishing in twenty-sixth position overall.

In the 1995 and 1996 seasons, Katoh ranked 14th overall. In 1997, he had a podium finish at the German GP in thirteenth place overall. He retired the following season, finishing in sixteenth place.

== Results ==
Scoring system from 1993 onwards:

Position	1.º	2.º	3.º	4.º	5.º	6.º	7.º	8.º	9.º	10.º	11.º	12.º	13.º	14.º	15.º
Points	25	20	16	13	11	10	9	8	7	6	5	4	3	2	1

(key) (Races in bold indicate pole position, races in italics indicate fastest lap)

Year	Class	Machine	1	2	3	4	5	6	7	8	9	10	11	12	13	14	15	Pts	Pos
1991	250cc	Yamaha	JAP; 24	AUS -	USA -	SPA -	ITA -	ALE -	AUT -	EUR -	NED -	FRA -	GBR -	RSM -	CHE -	LMA -	MAL -	0	-
1992	250cc	Yamaha	JAP; Ret	AUS -	MAL -	SPA -	ITA -	EUR -	ALE -	NED -	HUN -	FRA -	GBR -	BRA -	RSA -			0	-
1994	125cc	Yamaha	AUS; Ret	MAL; Ret	JPN -	SPA; Ret	AUT; 12	GER; Ret	NED; Ret	ITA -	FRA -	GBR -	CZE -	USA -	ARG -	EUR; 12		8	26th
1995	125cc	Yamaha	AUS; 10	MAL; Ret	JPN; 6	SPA; 16	GER; 11	ITA; 8	NED; 12	FRA; 9	GBR; Ret	CZE -	BRA; 15	ARG; 12	EUR; 6			55	14th
1996	125cc	Yamaha	MAL; Ret	INA; Ret	JPN; Ret	SPA; 9	ITA; 16	FRA; 5	NED; Ret	GER; 18	GBR; 7	AUS; 16	CZE; 12	IMO; 8	CAT; 7	RIO; 12	EUR; 7	61	14th
1997	125cc	Yamaha	MAL; 8	JAP; 6	SPA; 10	ITA; 15	AUT; Ret	FRA; 6	NED; Ret	IMO; 12	ALE; 2	RIO; 16	GBR; 6	CZE; Ret	CAT; 13	IDN; 21	AUS; 14	74	13th
1998	125cc	Yamaha	JAP; 12	MAL; 17	SPA; Ret	ITA; 19	FRA; 10	MAD; 11	NED; Ret	GBR; Ret	ALE; 6	CZE; 15	IMO; 8	CAT; 7	AUS; Ret	ARG; 14		45	16th
