= Olivier Jacque =

French motorcycle racer

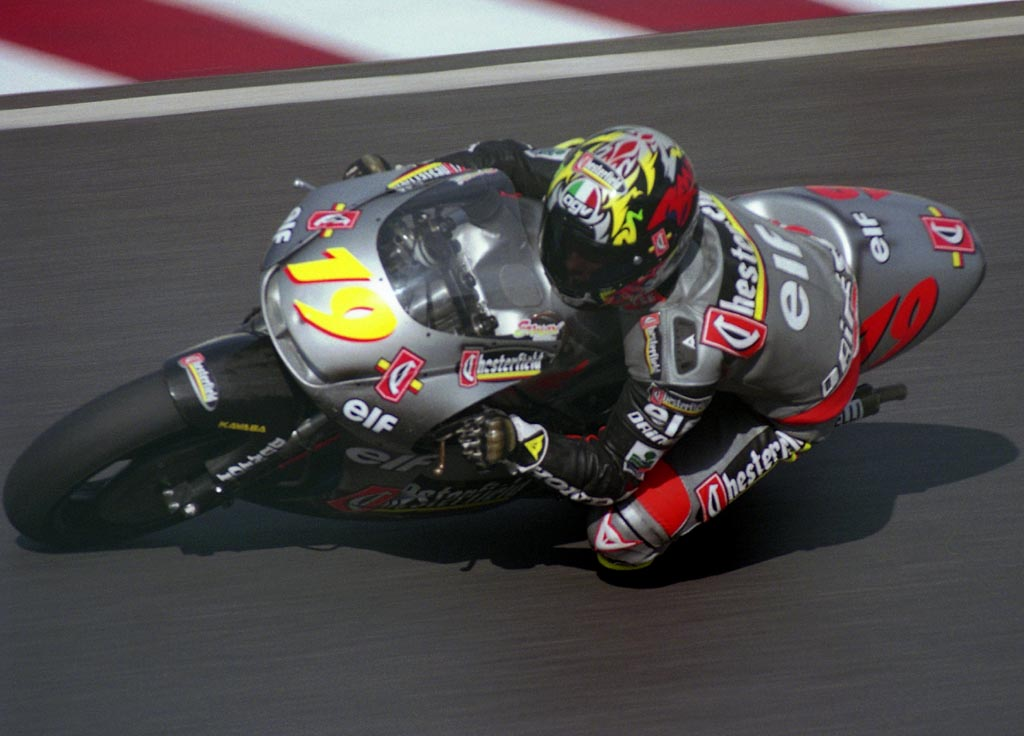
- Jacque at the 1996 Japanese Grand Prix
- Nationality: French
Motorcycle racing career statistics
Grand Prix motorcycle racing
| Active years | 1995–2005, 2007 |
| First race | 1995 250cc Australian Grand Prix |
| Last race | 2007 MotoGP Italian Grand Prix |
| First win | 1996 250cc Brazilian Grand Prix |
| Last win | 2000 250cc Australian Grand Prix |
| Team(s) | Honda, Yamaha, Moriwaki, Kawasaki |
| Championships | 1; 250cc: 2000 |
Starts / Wins / Podiums / Poles / F. laps / Points; 136 / 7 / 35 / 17 / 9 / 1221

Olivier Jacque (born 29 August 1973 in Villerupt, France) is a French former professional Grand Prix motorcycle road racer.

== Career ==
Jacque was second in the 250cc European Championship in 1994, before moving on to the 250cc World Championship. He achieved a top-ten finish in the points standings every year he competed. In 2000, he had a season-long battle for the championship with Tech3 teammate Shinya Nakano and Daijiro Kato, ultimately winning the 250cc Motorcycle World Champion on a Yamaha YZR250.

For 2001, Jacque moved up to the 500cc class with the Tech3 team. He spent three years with Tech3, before starting 2004 without a ride. He made one appearance on a Moriwaki bike, but again was without a ride as 2005 started. He stepped in for the injured Alex Hofmann in China and stunned the series regulars by finishing second to Valentino Rossi on the factory Kawasaki. He was then permanently hired by Kawasaki as an occasional extra race rider. He did not race for them in 2006, but was chosen for 2007 alongside countryman Randy de Puniet, replacing Nakano. Sete Gibernau was later revealed to have rejected the ride before Jacque was offered it.

However, the season was a disaster. At Istanbul, Jacque triggered a four-bike collision, missing his braking point into a corner on lap 1 and hitting Colin Edwards, with Dani Pedrosa and Chris Vermeulen also getting caught up. In the next round in Shanghai, he crashed in practice, gashing his arm severely enough to be unable to race there or at Le Mans. He again crashed in practice at Barcelona, missing this race too.

Following the series of injuries, Jacque announced his retirement from MotoGP in June 2007. He remains as development rider and technical advisor for Kawasaki Racing Team.

== Commitment ==
Jacque is today a member of the ‘Champions for Peace’ club, a group of 54 famous elite athletes committed to serving peace in the world through sport, created by Peace and Sport, a Monaco-based international organization.

== Career statistics ==
=== Grand Prix motorcycle racing ===
==== Races by year ====
(key) (Races in bold indicate pole position, races in italics indicate fastest lap)

| Year | Class | Bike | 1 | 2 | 3 | 4 | 5 | 6 | 7 | 8 | 9 | 10 | 11 | 12 | 13 | 14 | 15 | 16 | 17 | 18 | Pos | Pts |
|---|---|---|---|---|---|---|---|---|---|---|---|---|---|---|---|---|---|---|---|---|---|---|
| 1995 | 250cc | Honda | AUS; Ret | MAL; 10 | JPN; Ret | SPA; 12 | GER; 11 | ITA; 16 | NED; Ret | FRA; 9 | GBR; 4 | CZE; 14 | BRA; 7 | ARG; 4 | EUR; 9 | | | | | | 10th | 66 |
| 1996 | 250cc | Honda | MAL; 4 | INA; 8 | JPN; 4 | SPA; 7 | ITA; 4 | FRA; Ret | **NED**; Ret | GER; 2 | **GBR**; 3 | **AUT**; Ret | CZE; 2 | IMO; 2 | CAT; 2 | **BRA**; 1 | AUS; 3 | | | | 3rd | 193 |
| 1997 | 250cc | Honda | MAL; 3 | JPN; DNS | SPA; 7 | ITA; 5 | AUT; 1 | **FRA**; Ret | **NED**; Ret | **IMO**; 2 | **GER**; 2 | **BRA**; 1 | GBR; 4 | CZE; 2 | CAT; 6 | INA; 3 | AUS; 3 | | | | 4th | 201 |
| 1998 | 250cc | Honda | JPN; 5 | MAL; 3 | SPA; 3 | ITA; Ret | FRA; 4 | MAD; Ret | NED; Ret | GBR | GER | CZE; Ret | IMO; 5 | CAT; 4 | AUS; 3 | ARG; 3 | | | | | 5th | 112 |
| 1999 | 250cc | Yamaha | MAL; 4 | JPN; Ret | SPA; DNS | FRA | ITA | CAT | NED | GBR | GER; 8 | CZE; 5 | **IMO**; 3 | VAL; Ret | AUS; 2 | RSA; 3 | **BRA**; 4 | ARG; 1 | | | 7th | 122 |
| 2000 | 250cc | Yamaha | RSA; 4 | MAL; 2 | JPN; 4 | SPA; 4 | FRA; 3 | ITA; 2 | CAT; 1 | NED; 2 | **GBR**; 2 | **GER**; 1 | **CZE**; 3 | **POR**; 2 | **VAL**; 2 | BRA; Ret | PAC; 4 | AUS; 1 | | | 1st | 279 |
| 2001 | 500cc | Yamaha | JPN; Ret | RSA; 16 | SPA; DNS | FRA; DNQ | ITA | CAT; 12 | NED; 11 | GBR; 9 | GER; 6 | CZE; 12 | POR; 8 | VAL; 5 | PAC; Ret | AUS; 6 | MAL; Ret | BRA; Ret | | | 15th | 59 |
| 2002 | MotoGP | Yamaha | JPN; Ret | RSA; 6 | SPA; 11 | FRA; Ret | ITA; 9 | CAT; 9 | NED; 14 | GBR; 5 | **GER**; Ret | CZE; 10 | POR; Ret | BRA; 7 | PAC; 7 | MAL; Ret | AUS; 8 | VAL; 9 | | | 10th | 81 |
| 2003 | MotoGP | Yamaha | JPN; 15 | RSA; 10 | SPA; 10 | FRA; 4 | ITA; 10 | CAT; Ret | NED; 5 | GBR; Ret | GER; 9 | CZE; 11 | POR; 13 | BRA; Ret | PAC; 13 | MAL; DNS | AUS; 6 | VAL; Ret | | | 12th | 71 |
| 2004 | MotoGP | Moriwaki | RSA | SPA | FRA | ITA | CAT | NED | BRA | GER | GBR | CZE | POR | JPN; 11 | QAT | MAL | AUS | VAL; Ret | | | 24th | 5 |
| 2005 | MotoGP | Kawasaki | ESP | POR | CHN; 2 | FRA; 11 | ITA | CAT | NED | USA | GBR | GER; Ret | CZE | JPN | MAL; Ret | QAT; DNS | AUS; 16 | TUR; 13 | VAL | | 17th | 28 |
| 2007 | MotoGP | Kawasaki | QAT; 12 | SPA; 18 | TUR; Ret | CHN; DNS | FRA | ITA; 16 | CAT; DNS | GBR | NED | GER | USA | CZE | RSM | POR | JPN | AUS | MAL | VAL | 23rd | 4 |
