= 2000 German motorcycle Grand Prix =

(Germany) 2000 German Grand Prix
Race details
- Race 10 of 16 races in the 2000 Grand Prix motorcycle racing season
- Date: 23 July 2000
- Official name: Cinzano Motorrad Grand Prix Deutschland
- Location: Sachsenring
- Course: Permanent racing facility; 3.386 km (2.104 mi)

500cc
Pole position
- Rider: (United States) Kenny Roberts Jr.
- Time: 1:23.168
Fastest lap
- Rider: (Japan) Tadayuki Okada
- Time: 1:23.918 on lap 16
Podium
- First: (Brazil) Alex Barros
- Second: (Italy) Valentino Rossi
- Third: (United States) Kenny Roberts Jr.

250cc
Pole position
- Rider: (France) Olivier Jacque
- Time: 1:23.396
Fastest lap
- Rider: (France) Olivier Jacque
- Time: 1:23.575 on lap 13
Podium
- First: (France) Olivier Jacque
- Second: (Japan) Tohru Ukawa
- Third: (Japan) Shinya Nakano

125cc
Pole position
- Rider: (Japan) Youichi Ui
- Time: 1:25.460
Fastest lap
- Rider: (Japan) Youichi Ui
- Time: 1:26.150 on lap 7
Podium
- First: (Japan) Youichi Ui
- Second: (Italy) Roberto Locatelli
- Third: (Italy) Simone Sanna

The 2000 German motorcycle Grand Prix was the tenth round of the 2000 Grand Prix motorcycle racing season. It took place on 23 July 2000 at the Sachsenring.

== 500 cc classification ==
Pos.	No.	Rider	Team	Manufacturer	Laps	Time/Retired	Grid	Points
1	10	(Brazil) Alex Barros	Emerson Honda Pons	Honda	31	43:54.632	2	25
2	46	(Italy) Valentino Rossi	Nastro Azzurro Honda	Honda	31	+0.078	6	20
3	2	(United States) Kenny Roberts Jr.	Telefónica Movistar Suzuki	Suzuki	31	+0.864	1	16
4	4	(Italy) Max Biaggi	Marlboro Yamaha Team	Yamaha	31	+1.263	3	13
5	8	(Japan) Tadayuki Okada	Repsol YPF Honda Team	Honda	31	+1.674	10	11
6	65	(Italy) Loris Capirossi	Emerson Honda Pons	Honda	31	+3.014	4	10
7	55	(France) Régis Laconi	Red Bull Yamaha WCM	Yamaha	31	+13.606	14	9
8	5	(Spain) Sete Gibernau	Repsol YPF Honda Team	Honda	31	+13.917	12	8
9	7	(Spain) Carlos Checa	Marlboro Yamaha Team	Yamaha	31	+14.019	17	7
10	24	(Australia) Garry McCoy	Red Bull Yamaha WCM	Yamaha	31	+20.085	11	6
11	6	(Japan) Norick Abe	Antena 3 Yamaha d'Antin	Yamaha	31	+26.590	15	5
12	25	(Spain) José Luis Cardoso	Maxon Dee Cee Jeans	Honda	31	+29.564	18	4
13	9	(Japan) Nobuatsu Aoki	Telefónica Movistar Suzuki	Suzuki	31	+49.188	7	3
14	27	(Italy) Luca Cadalora	Proton Team KR	Modenas KR3	31	+53.542	16	2
15	43	(Italy) Paolo Tessari	Team Paton	Paton	30	+1 lap	19	1
Ret	31	(Japan) Tetsuya Harada	Blu Aprilia Team	Aprilia	27	Accident	9	
Ret	1	(Spain) Àlex Crivillé	Repsol YPF Honda Team	Honda	12	Accident	13	
Ret	17	(Netherlands) Jurgen van den Goorbergh	Rizla Honda	TSR-Honda	12	Accident	5	
Ret	99	(United Kingdom) Jeremy McWilliams	Blu Aprilia Team	Aprilia	8	Accident	8	
DNS	56	(Japan) Tekkyu Kayo	FCC TSR	TSR-Honda		Did not start		
DNQ	20	(United Kingdom) Phil Giles	Sabre Sport	Honda		Did not qualify		
WD	18	(Belgium) Sébastien Le Grelle	Tecmas Honda Elf	Honda		Withdrew		

== 250 cc classification ==
Pos.	No.	Rider	Manufacturer	Laps	Time/Retired	Grid	Points
1	19	(France) Olivier Jacque	Yamaha	30	42:15.207	1	25
2	4	(Japan) Tohru Ukawa	Honda	30	+11.689	2	20
3	56	(Japan) Shinya Nakano	Yamaha	30	+21.810	5	16
4	74	(Japan) Daijiro Kato	Honda	30	+30.105	7	13
5	26	(Germany) Klaus Nöhles	Aprilia	30	+31.781	4	11
6	44	(Italy) Roberto Rolfo	Aprilia	30	+32.291	11	10
7	21	(Italy) Franco Battaini	Aprilia	30	+33.336	10	9
8	6	(Germany) Ralf Waldmann	Aprilia	30	+49.750	6	8
9	9	(Argentina) Sebastián Porto	Yamaha	30	+50.214	12	7
10	14	(Australia) Anthony West	Honda	30	+54.596	9	6
11	16	(Sweden) Johan Stigefelt	TSR-Honda	30	+55.353	14	5
12	10	(Spain) Fonsi Nieto	Yamaha	30	+59.592	16	4
13	22	(France) Sébastien Gimbert	TSR-Honda	30	+1:07.700	17	3
14	8	(Japan) Naoki Matsudo	Yamaha	30	+1:15.446	21	2
15	37	(Italy) Luca Boscoscuro	Aprilia	30	+1:16.320	25	1
16	11	(Italy) Ivan Clementi	Aprilia	30	+1:27.342	26	
17	23	(France) Julien Allemand	Yamaha	29	+1 lap	22	
18	18	(Malaysia) Shahrol Yuzy	Yamaha	29	+1 lap	30	
19	42	(Spain) David Checa	TSR-Honda	29	+1 lap	29	
20	76	(Germany) Dirk Heidolf	Yamaha	29	+1 lap	32	
21	24	(United Kingdom) Jason Vincent	Aprilia	29	+1 lap	18	
22	31	(Spain) Lucas Oliver	Yamaha	29	+1 lap	24	
23	78	(Germany) Dirk Reissmann	Yamaha	29	+1 lap	27	
24	15	(United Kingdom) Adrian Coates	Aprilia	29	+1 lap	23	
25	75	(Germany) Matthias Neukirchen	Yamaha	29	+1 lap	31	
26	20	(Spain) Jerónimo Vidal	Aprilia	29	+1 lap	19	
27	79	(Germany) Andreas Göbel	Honda	28	+2 laps	33	
Ret	77	(United Kingdom) Jamie Robinson	Aprilia	21	Retirement	8	
Ret	35	(Italy) Marco Melandri	Aprilia	12	Retirement	3	
Ret	41	(Netherlands) Jarno Janssen	TSR-Honda	6	Accident	20	
Ret	30	(Spain) Alex Debón	Aprilia	6	Retirement	13	
Ret	80	(Germany) Christian Gemmel	Honda	2	Accident	28	
Ret	25	(France) Vincent Philippe	TSR-Honda	0	Accident	15	

== 125 cc classification ==
Pos.	No.	Rider	Manufacturer	Laps	Time/Retired	Grid	Points
1	41	(Japan) Youichi Ui	Derbi	29	42:02.197	1	25
2	4	(Italy) Roberto Locatelli	Aprilia	29	+7.530	2	20
3	16	(Italy) Simone Sanna	Aprilia	29	+17.306	3	16
4	21	(France) Arnaud Vincent	Aprilia	29	+18.655	20	13
5	32	(Italy) Mirko Giansanti	Honda	29	+18.794	13	11
6	26	(Italy) Ivan Goi	Honda	29	+27.896	11	10
7	22	(Spain) Pablo Nieto	Derbi	29	+33.535	19	9
8	8	(Italy) Gianluigi Scalvini	Aprilia	29	+33.767	18	8
9	29	(Spain) Ángel Nieto Jr.	Honda	29	+34.131	10	7
10	17	(Germany) Steve Jenkner	Honda	29	+40.321	25	6
11	34	(Andorra) Eric Bataille	Honda	29	+40.664	27	5
12	51	(Italy) Marco Petrini	Aprilia	29	+44.699	22	4
13	5	(Japan) Noboru Ueda	Honda	29	+57.278	4	3
14	74	(Germany) Jarno Müller	Honda	29	+1:09.172	24	2
15	35	(Germany) Reinhard Stolz	Honda	29	+1:14.460	26	1
16	75	(Germany) Achim Kariger	Honda	29	+1:19.552	29	
17	77	(Germany) Andreas Hahn	Honda	28	+1 lap	30	
18	78	(Czech Republic) Jakub Smrž	Honda	28	+1 lap	23	
Ret	76	(Germany) Jascha Büch	Yamaha	21	Retirement	31	
Ret	24	(United Kingdom) Leon Haslam	Italjet	19	Retirement	28	
Ret	9	(Italy) Lucio Cecchinello	Honda	10	Retirement	9	
Ret	11	(Italy) Max Sabbatani	Honda	7	Retirement	12	
Ret	53	(San Marino) William de Angelis	Aprilia	6	Accident	21	
Ret	1	(Spain) Emilio Alzamora	Honda	3	Retirement	6	
Ret	39	(Czech Republic) Jaroslav Huleš	Italjet	2	Retirement	16	
Ret	12	(France) Randy de Puniet	Aprilia	1	Retirement	14	
Ret	15	(San Marino) Alex de Angelis	Honda	0	Accident	17	
Ret	18	(Spain) Antonio Elías	Honda	0	Accident	15	
Ret	23	(Italy) Gino Borsoi	Aprilia	0	Accident	8	
Ret	3	(Japan) Masao Azuma	Honda	0	Accident	5	
Ret	54	(San Marino) Manuel Poggiali	Derbi	0	Accident	7	

== Championship standings after the race (500cc) ==
Below are the standings for the top five riders and constructors after round ten has concluded.

Riders' Championship standings

Pos.	Rider	Points
1	(United States) Kenny Roberts Jr.	161
2	(Spain) Carlos Checa	123
3	(Italy) Valentino Rossi	112
4	(Italy) Loris Capirossi	112
5	(Japan) Norifumi Abe	106

Constructors' Championship standings

Pos.	Constructor	Points
1	(Japan) Honda	199
2	(Japan) Yamaha	186
3	(Japan) Suzuki	167
4	(Italy) Aprilia	68
5	(Japan) TSR-Honda	56

- Note: Only the top five positions are included for both sets of standings.

Previous race: 2000 British Grand Prix	FIM Grand Prix World Championship; 2000 season	Next race: 2000 Czech Republic Grand Prix
Previous race: 1999 German Grand Prix	German Grand Prix	Next race: 2001 German Grand Prix
