= 1995 Rio de Janeiro motorcycle Grand Prix =

(Rio de Janeiro (state)) 1995 Rio de Janeiro Grand Prix
Race details
- Race 11 of 13 races in the 1995 Grand Prix motorcycle racing season
- Date: 17 September 1995
- Official name: Lucky Strike Rio Grand Prix
- Location: Autódromo Internacional Nelson Piquet
- Course: Permanent racing facility; 5.088 km (3.162 mi)

MotoGP
Pole position
- Rider: (Australia) Mick Doohan
- Time: 1:55.972
Fastest lap
- Rider: (Italy) Luca Cadalora
- Time: 1:54.912
Podium
- First: (Italy) Luca Cadalora
- Second: (Australia) Mick Doohan
- Third: (Japan) Norick Abe

250cc
Pole position
- Rider: (Italy) Max Biaggi
- Time: 1:58.702
Fastest lap
- Rider: (Japan) Tetsuya Harada
- Time: 1:57.946
Podium
- First: (Italy) Doriano Romboni
- Second: (Italy) Max Biaggi
- Third: (Japan) Tadayuki Okada

125cc
Pole position
- Rider: (Italy) Stefano Perugini
- Time: 2:02.704
Fastest lap
- Rider: (Spain) Herri Torrontegui
- Time: 2:02.946
Podium
- First: (Japan) Masaki Tokudome
- Second: (Italy) Gianluigi Scalvini
- Third: (Japan) Haruchika Aoki

The 1995 Rio de Janeiro motorcycle Grand Prix was the eleventh round of the 1995 Grand Prix motorcycle racing season. It took place on 17 September 1995 at the Autódromo Internacional Nelson Piquet.

== 500 cc classification ==
Pos.	Rider	Team	Manufacturer	Time/Retired	Points
1	(Italy) Luca Cadalora	Marlboro Team Roberts	Yamaha	46:18.206	25
2	(Australia) Mick Doohan	Repsol YPF Honda Team	Honda	+5.569	20
3	(Japan) Norifumi Abe	Marlboro Team Roberts	Yamaha	+12.282	16
4	(Australia) Daryl Beattie	Lucky Strike Suzuki	Suzuki	+15.208	13
5	(United States) Scott Russell	Lucky Strike Suzuki	Suzuki	+15.610	11
6	(Spain) Àlex Crivillé	Repsol YPF Honda Team	Honda	+24.036	10
7	(Spain) Carlos Checa	Fortuna Honda Pons	Honda	+24.490	9
8	(Brazil) Alex Barros	Kanemoto Honda	Honda	+24.701	8
9	(Italy) Loris Capirossi	Marlboro Team Pileri	Honda	+37.252	7
10	(Japan) Shinichi Itoh	Repsol YPF Honda Team	Honda	+53.657	6
11	(United Kingdom) Neil Hodgson	World Championship Motorsports	Yamaha	+59.260	5
12	(United Kingdom) Jeremy McWilliams	Millar Racing	Yamaha	+1:09.888	4
13	(Belgium) Laurent Naveau	Team ROC	ROC Yamaha	+1:10.390	3
14	(United Kingdom) Sean Emmett	Harris Grand Prix	Harris Yamaha	+1:10.717	2
15	(Switzerland) Adrien Bosshard	Thommen Elf Racing	ROC Yamaha	+1:10.928	1
16	(United Kingdom) James Haydon	Harris Grand Prix	Harris Yamaha	+1:42.962	
17	(France) Frederic Protat	FP Racing	ROC Yamaha	+1:57.758	
18	(United Kingdom) Eugene McManus	Padgett's Racing Team	Harris Yamaha	+1 Lap	
19	(Italy) Lucio Pedercini	Team Pedercini	ROC Yamaha	+1 Lap	
20	(United Kingdom) Lee Pullan	Padgett's Racing Team	Harris Yamaha	+1 Lap	
21	(France) José Kuhn	MTD	ROC Yamaha	+1 Lap	
Ret	(Italy) Cristiano Migliorati	Harris Grand Prix	Harris Yamaha	Retirement	
Ret	(Switzerland) Bernard Haenggeli	Haenggeli Racing	ROC Yamaha	Retirement	
Ret	(France) Marc Garcia	DR Team Shark	ROC Yamaha	Retirement	
Ret	(France) Jean Pierre Jeandat	JPJ Paton	Paton	Retirement	
Ret	(Italy) Loris Reggiani	Aprilia Racing Team	Aprilia	Retirement	
Ret	(Spain) Juan Borja	Team ROC NRJ	ROC Yamaha	Retirement	
Ret	(Italy) Marco Papa	Team Marco Papa	ROC Yamaha	Retirement	
Ret	(France) Bernard Garcia	Team ROC NRJ	ROC Yamaha	Retirement	

== 250 cc classification ==
Pos	Rider	Manufacturer	Time/Retired	Points
1	(Italy) Doriano Romboni	Honda	43:45.464	25
2	(Italy) Max Biaggi	Aprilia	+1.345	20
3	(Japan) Tadayuki Okada	Honda	+1.390	16
4	(Germany) Ralf Waldmann	Honda	+1.702	13
5	(Japan) Tetsuya Harada	Yamaha	+1.834	11
6	(France) Jean Philippe Ruggia	Honda	+2.148	10
7	(France) Olivier Jacque	Honda	+22.078	9
8	(Japan) Nobuatsu Aoki	Honda	+33.846	8
9	(Italy) Roberto Locatelli	Aprilia	+35.448	7
10	(Spain) Luis d'Antin	Honda	+37.422	6
11	(Germany) Jürgen Fuchs	Honda	+46.659	5
12	(Switzerland) Eskil Suter	Aprilia	+56.708	4
13	(United States) Kenny Roberts Jr	Yamaha	+56.906	3
14	(Spain) José Luis Cardoso	Aprilia	+57.023	2
15	(Spain) Luis Maurel	Honda	+1:02.608	1
16	(Spain) Ruben Xaus	Honda	+1:09.694	
17	(Japan) Takeshi Tsujimura	Honda	+1:09.776	
18	(Netherlands) Patrick vd Goorbergh	Aprilia	+1:22.220	
19	(United Kingdom) Niall Mackenzie	Aprilia	+1:23.690	
20	(Germany) Adolf Stadler	Aprilia	+1:49.322	
21	(Germany) Bernd Kassner	Aprilia	+1:49.455	
Ret	(Spain) Miguel Angel Castilla	Aprilia	Retirement	
Ret	(Spain) Pere Riba	Aprilia	Retirement	
Ret	(Netherlands) Jurgen vd Goorbergh	Honda	Retirement	
Ret	(Venezuela) José Barresi	Honda	Retirement	
Ret	(France) Jean-Michel Bayle	Aprilia	Retirement	
Ret	(Spain) Gregorio Lavilla	Honda	Retirement	
Ret	(France) Regis Laconi	Honda	Retirement	
Ret	(Italy) Davide Bulega	Honda	Retirement	

== 125 cc classification ==
Pos	Rider	Manufacturer	Time/Retired	Points
1	(Japan) Masaki Tokudome	Aprilia	41:29.854	25
2	(Italy) Gianluigi Scalvini	Aprilia	+0.204	20
3	(Japan) Haruchika Aoki	Honda	+0.422	16
4	(Spain) Herri Torrontegui	Honda	+0.548	13
5	(Japan) Noboru Ueda	Honda	+8.834	11
6	(Japan) Akira Saito	Honda	+8.950	10
7	(United Kingdom) Darren Barton	Yamaha	+9.012	9
8	(Germany) Dirk Raudies	Honda	+9.612	8
9	(Japan) Tomomi Manako	Honda	+14.174	7
10	(Spain) Emilio Alzamora	Honda	+19.244	6
11	(Spain) Jorge Martinez	Aprilia	+26.088	5
12	(Japan) Hideyuki Nakajo	Honda	+33.976	4
13	(Japan) Takehiro Yamamoto	Honda	+34.208	3
14	(Germany) Stefan Prein	Honda	+34.436	2
15	(Japan) Yoshiaki Katoh	Yamaha	+34.932	1
16	(Spain) Josep Sarda	Honda	+35.048	
17	(Japan) Tomoko Igata	Honda	+37.817	
18	(Germany) Peter Öttl	Aprilia	+38.138	
19	(Germany) Manfred Geissler	Aprilia	+52.498	
20	(Japan) Ken Miyasaka	Honda	+52.640	
21	(Japan) Yoshiyuki Sugai	Honda	+1:10.903	
Ret	(Italy) Stefano Perugini	Aprilia	Retirement	
Ret	(Japan) Hiroyuki Kikuchi	Honda	Retirement	
Ret	(Germany) Oliver Koch	Aprilia	Retirement	
Ret	(Italy) Massimo d'Agnano	Aprilia	Retirement	
Ret	(Japan) Kazuto Sakata	Aprilia	Retirement	
Ret	(Italy) Luigi Ancona	Yamaha	Retirement	
Ret	(Italy) Andrea Ballerini	Aprilia	Retirement	
Ret	(Italy) Gabriele Debbia	Yamaha	Retirement	

Previous race: 1995 Czech Republic Grand Prix	FIM Grand Prix World Championship; 1995 season	Next race: 1995 Argentine Grand Prix
Previous race: None	Rio de Janeiro Grand Prix	Next race: 1996 Rio de Janeiro Grand Prix
