= Frédéric Petit (motorcyclist) =

French motorcycle racer

- Nationality: French
Motorcycle racing career statistics
Grand Prix motorcycle racing
Active years	1994 - 1999
First race	1994 125cc Australian Grand Prix
Last race	1999 125cc Argentine Grand Prix
Starts / Wins / Podiums / Poles / F. laps / Points; 72 / 0 / 0 / 0 / 0 / 200

Frédéric Petit (born 6 May 1975) is a former Grand Prix motorcycle road racer from France. His best years were in 1997 and 1998 when he finished in tenth place in the 125cc world championship.
