= Masaki Tokudome =

Japanese motorcycle racer (born 1971)

- Nationality: Japanese
- Born: 14 February 1971 (age 55); Miyanojō, Kagoshima, Japan
- Current team: Marumae MTR
Motorcycle racing career statistics
Grand Prix motorcycle racing
Active years	1994 - 1999, 2003, 2005
First race	1994 125cc Australian Grand Prix
Last race	2005 250cc Japanese Grand Prix
First win	1995 125cc Brazilian Grand Prix
Last win	1996 125cc Imola Grand Prix
Team	Aprilia
Starts / Wins / Podiums / Poles / F. laps / Points; 85 / 5 / 11 / 5 / 3 / 640.5

Masaki Tokudome (徳留 真紀, Tokudome Masaki; born 14 February 1971) is a Japanese occasional motorcycle racer. Tokudome competed in international Grand Prix motorcycle racing between 1994 and 2005, finishing second in the 125cc World Championship behind countryman Haruchika Aoki while riding for the Aprilia factory team in 1996. Tokudome won five Grand Prix races during his career.

Tokudome was a longtime competitor in the All-Japan Road Race Championship after departing the international scene. He was the J-GP3 Champion in the class for the first time in 2012, after being runner up on three separate occasions, and again in 2016. Tokudome retired from full-time competition in 2024.

== Career statistics ==
1992- 1st, Japan GP125 Super Cup #36 Honda RS125R
1993- 3rd, All Japan GP125 Championship #36 Honda RS125R
1994- 8th, 125cc World Championship #36 Honda RS125R
1995- 7th, 125cc World Championship #8 Honda RS125R
1996- 2nd, 125cc World Championship #7 Aprilia RS 125 R
1997- 5th, 125cc World Championship #2 Aprilia RS 125 R
1998- 7th, 125cc World Championship #5 Aprilia RS 125 R
1999- 18th, 250cc World Championship #36 TSR Honda RS125R
2001- 14th, All Japan GP125 Championship #39 Yamaha TZR125
2002- 12th, All Japan GP250 Championship #36 Yamaha TZR250
2003- 4th, All Japan GP250 Championship #12 Yamaha TZR250
2004- 6th, All Japan GP250 Championship #4 Yamaha TZR250
2005- 8th, All Japan GP250 Championship #6 Yamaha TZR250
2006- 11th, All Japan GP125 Championship #36 Honda RS125R
2007- 2nd, All Japan GP125 Championship #11 Honda RS125R
2008- 2nd, All Japan GP125 Championship #2 Honda RS125R
2009- 4th, All Japan GP125 Championship #2 Honda RS125R
2010- 7th, All Japan J-GP3 Championship #4 Honda RS125R
2011- 2nd, All Japan J-GP3 Championship #7 Honda RS125R
2012- 1st, All Japan J-GP3 Championship #634 Honda RS125R
2013- 7th, All Japan J-GP3 Championship #1 Honda NSF250R
2014- 4th, All Japan J-GP3 Championship #7 Honda NSF250R
2015- 6th, All Japan J-GP3 Championship #4 Honda NSF250R
2016- 1st, All Japan J-GP3 Championship #36 Honda NSF250R
2017- 8th, All Japan J-GP2 Championship #36 Speed Up SF
2018- All Japan J-GP2 Championship #36 Speed Up SF

=== All Japan Road Race Championship ===
==== Races by year ====
(key) (Races in bold indicate pole position; races in italics indicate fastest lap)

Year	Class	Bike	1	2	3	4	5	6	7	Pos	Pts
2024	J-GP3	Honda	MOT; 14	SUG; 5	TSU; 12	AUT; 4	OKA; 7	SUZ; 5		6th	53
2025	J-GP3	Honda	SUG	TSU1	TSU2	MOT	AUT; 11	OKA	SUZ; 16	21st	2.5
2026	J-GP3	Honda	SUG	AUT; 6	TSU	MOT	OKA	SUZ; 23†		20th	10

- † – Rider did not finish the race, but was classified as he completed more than 75% of the race distance.
