= 1995 Czech Republic motorcycle Grand Prix =

1995 Czech Republic Grand Prix
Race details
- Race 10 of 13 races in the 1995 Grand Prix motorcycle racing season
- Date: 20 August 1995
- Official name: Grand Prix České Republiky
- Location: Brno Circuit
- Course: Permanent racing facility; 5.394 km (3.352 mi)

MotoGP
Pole position
- Rider: (Italy) Luca Cadalora
- Time: 2:02.180
Fastest lap
- Rider: (Italy) Luca Cadalora
- Time: 2:02.812
Podium
- First: (Italy) Luca Cadalora
- Second: (Australia) Mick Doohan
- Third: (Australia) Daryl Beattie

250cc
Pole position
- Rider: (Italy) Max Biaggi
- Time: 2:04.682
Fastest lap
- Rider: (Japan) Tetsuya Harada
- Time: 2:04.684
Podium
- First: (Italy) Max Biaggi
- Second: (Japan) Tetsuya Harada
- Third: (Germany) Ralf Waldmann

125cc
Pole position
- Rider: (Japan) Kazuto Sakata
- Time: 2:10.577
Fastest lap
- Rider: (Japan) Kazuto Sakata
- Time: 2:11.305
Podium
- First: (Japan) Kazuto Sakata
- Second: (Japan) Haruchika Aoki
- Third: (Japan) Akira Saito

The 1995 Czech Republic motorcycle Grand Prix was the tenth round of the 1995 Grand Prix motorcycle racing season. It took place on 20 August 1995 at the Masaryk Circuit located in Brno, Czech Republic.

== 500 cc classification ==
Pos.	Rider	Team	Manufacturer	Time/Retired	Points
1	(Italy) Luca Cadalora	Marlboro Team Roberts	Yamaha	45:28.726	25
2	(Australia) Mick Doohan	Repsol YPF Honda Team	Honda	+4.148	20
3	(Australia) Daryl Beattie	Lucky Strike Suzuki	Suzuki	+9.399	16
4	(Italy) Loris Capirossi	Marlboro Team Pileri	Honda	+15.646	13
5	(Japan) Shinichi Itoh	Repsol YPF Honda Team	Honda	+18.831	11
6	(Spain) Àlex Crivillé	Repsol YPF Honda Team	Honda	+21.952	10
7	(Italy) Loris Reggiani	Aprilia Racing Team	Aprilia	+22.542	9
8	(Spain) Carlos Checa	Fortuna Honda Pons	Honda	+27.320	8
9	(Brazil) Alex Barros	Kanemoto Honda	Honda	+27.418	7
10	(United Kingdom) Neil Hodgson	World Championship Motorsports	Yamaha	+31.840	6
11	(United States) Scott Russell	Lucky Strike Suzuki	Suzuki	+32.394	5
12	(Spain) Juan Borja	Team ROC NRJ	ROC Yamaha	+1:03.206	4
13	(France) Bernard Garcia	Team ROC NRJ	ROC Yamaha	+1:07.640	3
14	(Belgium) Laurent Naveau	Team ROC	ROC Yamaha	+1:10.294	2
15	(Switzerland) Adrien Bosshard	Thommen Elf Racing	ROC Yamaha	+1:24.826	1
16	(United Kingdom) Jeremy McWilliams	Millar Racing	Yamaha	+1:30.129	
17	(France) Frederic Protat	FP Racing	ROC Yamaha	+1:37.943	
18	(United Kingdom) Chris Walker	Padgett's Racing Team	Harris Yamaha	+1:48.238	
19	(United Kingdom) Eugene McManus	Padgett's Racing Team	Harris Yamaha	+1:48.366	
20	(France) Marc Garcia	DR Team Shark	ROC Yamaha	+2:09.350	
21	(France) Bruno Bonhuil	MTD	ROC Yamaha	+1 Lap	
22	(Switzerland) Bernard Haenggeli	Haenggeli Racing	ROC Yamaha	+1 Lap	
23	(Italy) Marco Papa	Team Marco Papa	ROC Yamaha	+1 Lap	
Ret	(Italy) Lucio Pedercini	Team Pedercini	ROC Yamaha	Retirement	
Ret	(United Kingdom) Sean Emmett	Harris Grand Prix	Harris Yamaha	Retirement	
Ret	(Italy) Cristiano Migliorati	Harris Grand Prix	Harris Yamaha	Retirement	
Ret	(Japan) Norifumi Abe	Marlboro Team Roberts	Yamaha	Retirement	
Ret	(United Kingdom) James Haydon	Harris Grand Prix	Harris Yamaha	Retirement	
Ret	(France) José Kuhn	JPJ Paton	Paton	Retirement	
DNS	(United States) Scott Gray	Starsport	Harris Yamaha	Did not start	

== 250 cc classification ==
Pos	Rider	Manufacturer	Time/Retired	Points
1	(Italy) Max Biaggi	Aprilia	41:56.604	25
2	(Japan) Tetsuya Harada	Yamaha	+0.156	20
3	(Germany) Ralf Waldmann	Honda	+13.422	16
4	(Spain) Luis d'Antin	Honda	+40.632	13
5	(Italy) Doriano Romboni	Honda	+40.652	11
6	(France) Jean Philippe Ruggia	Honda	+40.774	10
7	(Japan) Tadayuki Okada	Honda	+40.982	9
8	(United States) Kenny Roberts Jr	Yamaha	+41.168	8
9	(Japan) Nobuatsu Aoki	Honda	+41.847	7
10	(Germany) Jürgen Fuchs	Honda	+41.913	6
11	(France) Jean-Michel Bayle	Aprilia	+47.579	5
12	(Netherlands) Patrick vd Goorbergh	Aprilia	+50.026	4
13	(Spain) José Luis Cardoso	Aprilia	+50.672	3
14	(France) Olivier Jacque	Honda	+54.286	2
15	(Italy) Roberto Locatelli	Aprilia	+54.914	1
16	(Germany) Adolf Stadler	Aprilia	+1:02.622	
17	(Spain) Luis Maurel	Honda	+1:10.362	
18	(Spain) Gregorio Lavilla	Honda	+1:14.438	
19	(Germany) Bernd Kassner	Aprilia	+1:20.277	
20	(Venezuela) José Barresi	Honda	+1:24.715	
21	(France) Regis Laconi	Honda	+1:27.010	
22	(Switzerland) Olivier Petrucciani	Aprilia	+1:34.142	
23	(Spain) Ruben Xaus	Honda	+1:58.486	
24	(Spain) Miguel Angel Castilla	Honda	+1:58.564	
25	(Czech Republic) Bohumil Stasa Jr	Aprilia	+1:59.679	
26	(Spain) Pere Riba	Aprilia	+2:03.976	
27	(Austria) Uwe Bolterhauer	Yamaha	+1 Lap	
Ret	(Czech Republic) Otto Krmicek	Yamaha	Retirement	
Ret	(Netherlands) Jurgen vd Goorbergh	Honda	Retirement	
Ret	(United Kingdom) Niall Mackenzie	Aprilia	Retirement	
Ret	(Switzerland) Eskil Suter	Aprilia	Retirement	

== 125 cc classification ==
Pos	Rider	Manufacturer	Time/Retired	Points
1	(Japan) Kazuto Sakata	Aprilia	42:08.715	25
2	(Japan) Haruchika Aoki	Honda	+7.495	20
3	(Japan) Akira Saito	Honda	+7.967	16
4	(Japan) Masaki Tokudome	Aprilia	+7.970	13
5	(Japan) Hideyuki Nakajo	Honda	+11.068	11
6	(Italy) Gianluigi Scalvini	Aprilia	+20.659	10
7	(Japan) Tomoko Igata	Honda	+22.317	9
8	(Japan) Tomomi Manako	Honda	+22.499	8
9	(Japan) Noboru Ueda	Honda	+23.162	7
10	(Spain) Emilio Alzamora	Honda	+23.363	6
11	(Germany) Manfred Geissler	Aprilia	+23.383	5
12	(Spain) Herri Torrontegui	Honda	+24.254	4
13	(Japan) Ken Miyasaka	Honda	+30.202	3
14	(Germany) Oliver Koch	Aprilia	+39.897	2
15	(Japan) Yoshiyuki Sugai	Honda	+41.829	1
16	(Spain) Josep Sarda	Honda	+41.916	
17	(Italy) Luigi Ancona	Honda	+42.192	
18	(Spain) Jorge Martinez	Yamaha	+43.163	
19	(Italy) Andrea Ballerini	Aprilia	+43.343	
20	(Czech Republic) Jaroslav Hules	Honda	+52.217	
21	(Japan) Hiroyuki Kikuchi	Honda	+1:37.303	
22	(Italy) Massimo d'Agnano	Aprilia	+1:37.344	
Ret	(Slovakia) Vladimir Castka	Honda	Retirement	
Ret	(Japan) Takehiro Yamamoto	Honda	Retirement	
Ret	(Italy) Stefano Perugini	Honda	Retirement	
Ret	(Spain) Angel Nieto Jr	Yamaha	Retirement	
Ret	(Germany) Dirk Raudies	Honda	Retirement	
Ret	(United Kingdom) Darren Barton	Yamaha	Retirement	
Ret	(Germany) Stefan Prein	Honda	Retirement	
Ret	(Germany) Benjamin Weiss	Honda	Retirement	
Ret	(Germany) Alexander Folger	Aprilia	Retirement	
Ret	(Germany) Peter Öttl	Aprilia	Retirement	
Ret	(Italy) Gabriele Debbia	Yamaha	Retirement	

Previous race: 1995 British Grand Prix	FIM Grand Prix World Championship; 1995 season	Next race: 1995 Rio de Janeiro Grand Prix
Previous race: 1994 Czech Republic Grand Prix	Czech Republic Grand Prix	Next race: 1996 Czech Republic Grand Prix
