= 1995 European motorcycle Grand Prix =

(Europe) 1995 European Grand Prix
Race details
- Race 13 of 13 races in the 1995 Grand Prix motorcycle racing season
- Date: 8 October 1995
- Official name: Gran Premio Marlboro de Catalunya
- Location: Circuit de Catalunya
- Course: Permanent racing facility; 4.727 km (2.937 mi)

MotoGP
Pole position
- Rider: (Italy) Luca Cadalora
- Time: 1:46.335
Fastest lap
- Rider: (Spain) Carlos Checa
- Time: 1:47.525
Podium
- First: (Spain) Àlex Crivillé
- Second: (Japan) Shinichi Itoh
- Third: (Italy) Loris Capirossi

250cc
Pole position
- Rider: (Japan) Tetsuya Harada
- Time: 1:48.286
Fastest lap
- Rider: (Italy) Max Biaggi
- Time: 1:48.882
Podium
- First: (Italy) Max Biaggi
- Second: (Japan) Tetsuya Harada
- Third: (Germany) Ralf Waldmann

125cc
Pole position
- Rider: (Japan) Haruchika Aoki
- Time: 1:54.272
Fastest lap
- Rider: (Japan) Haruchika Aoki
- Time: 1:54.703
Podium
- First: (Japan) Haruchika Aoki
- Second: (Spain) Emilio Alzamora
- Third: (Japan) Tomomi Manako

The 1995 European motorcycle Grand Prix was the last round of the 1995 Grand Prix motorcycle racing season. It took place on 8 October 1995 at the Circuit de Catalunya.

== 500 cc classification ==
Pos.	Rider	Team	Manufacturer	Time/Retired	Points
1	(Spain) Àlex Crivillé	Repsol YPF Honda Team	Honda	45:16.932	25
2	(Japan) Shinichi Itoh	Repsol YPF Honda Team	Honda	+0.160	20
3	(Italy) Loris Capirossi	Marlboro Team Pileri	Honda	+0.623	16
4	(Australia) Mick Doohan	Repsol YPF Honda Team	Honda	+4.865	13
5	(Australia) Daryl Beattie	Lucky Strike Suzuki	Suzuki	+5.200	11
6	(Brazil) Alex Barros	Kanemoto Honda	Honda	+15.080	10
7	(Italy) Loris Reggiani	Aprilia Racing Team	Aprilia	+18.872	9
8	(United States) Scott Russell	Lucky Strike Suzuki	Suzuki	+19.610	8
9	(United Kingdom) Neil Hodgson	World Championship Motorsports	Yamaha	+44.756	7
10	(United Kingdom) James Haydon	Harris Grand Prix	Harris Yamaha	+54.007	6
11	(France) Bernard Garcia	Team ROC NRJ	ROC Yamaha	+58.271	5
12	(Belgium) Laurent Naveau	Team ROC	ROC Yamaha	+58.325	4
13	(United Kingdom) Sean Emmett	Harris Grand Prix	Harris Yamaha	+1:05.122	3
14	(France) Marc Garcia	DR Team Shark	ROC Yamaha	+1:07.658	2
15	(Italy) Lucio Pedercini	Team Pedercini	ROC Yamaha	+1:07.929	1
16	(Italy) Cristiano Migliorati	Harris Grand Prix	Harris Yamaha	+1:09.773	
17	(United Kingdom) Jeremy McWilliams	Millar Racing	Yamaha	+1:21.808	
18	(United Kingdom) Eugene McManus	Padgett's Racing Team	Harris Yamaha	+1:26.983	
19	(France) José Kuhn	MTD	ROC Yamaha	+1:50.257	
20	(Switzerland) Bernard Haenggeli	Haenggeli Racing	ROC Yamaha	+1:51.582	
21	(United Kingdom) Lee Pullan	Padgett's Racing Team	Harris Yamaha	+4 Laps	
Ret	(United States) Scott Gray	Starsport	Harris Yamaha	Retirement	
Ret	(Spain) Enrique De Juan	JLM	ROC Yamaha	Retirement	
Ret	(France) Frederic Protat	FP Racing	ROC Yamaha	Retirement	
Ret	(Japan) Norifumi Abe	Marlboro Team Roberts	Yamaha	Retirement	
Ret	(Spain) Carlos Checa	Fortuna Honda Pons	Honda	Retirement	
Ret	(Italy) Luca Cadalora	Marlboro Team Roberts	Yamaha	Retirement	
Ret	(France) Jean Pierre Jeandat	JPJ Paton	Paton	Retirement	
Ret	(Spain) Juan Borja	Team ROC NRJ	ROC Yamaha	Retirement	
Ret	(Switzerland) Adrien Bosshard	Thommen Elf Racing	ROC Yamaha	Retirement	
Ret	(Italy) Marco Papa	Team Marco Papa	ROC Yamaha	Retirement	

== 250 cc classification ==
Pos	Rider	Manufacturer	Time/Retired	Points
1	(Italy) Max Biaggi	Aprilia	42:08.167	25
2	(Japan) Tetsuya Harada	Yamaha	+11.019	20
3	(Germany) Ralf Waldmann	Honda	+11.070	16
4	(Spain) Luis d'Antin	Honda	+21.719	13
5	(United States) Kenny Roberts Jr	Yamaha	+21.807	11
6	(Japan) Nobuatsu Aoki	Honda	+22.609	10
7	(Japan) Tadayuki Okada	Honda	+26.130	9
8	(Germany) Jürgen Fuchs	Honda	+26.235	8
9	(France) Olivier Jacque	Honda	+28.941	7
10	(Italy) Roberto Locatelli	Aprilia	+34.869	6
11	(Switzerland) Eskil Suter	Aprilia	+41.871	5
12	(Spain) José Luis Cardoso	Aprilia	+42.065	4
13	(France) Jean Philippe Ruggia	Honda	+42.937	3
14	(Netherlands) Jurgen vd Goorbergh	Honda	+46.565	2
15	(Japan) Takeshi Tsujimura	Honda	+54.481	1
16	(Netherlands) Patrick vd Goorbergh	Aprilia	+1:06.434	
17	(Spain) Luis Maurel	Honda	+1:18.861	
18	(Spain) Miguel Angel Castilla	Honda	+1:36.507	
19	(Italy) Davide Bulega	Honda	+1:37.873	
20	(Switzerland) Olivier Petrucciani	Aprilia	+1:38.385	
21	(Spain) Javier Marsella	Honda	+1 Lap	
22	(Spain) Javier Diaz	Honda	+1 Lap	
23	(Spain) Raul Loscos	Honda	+1 Lap	
Ret	(Spain) Francisco Padro	Aprilia	Retirement	
Ret	(Venezuela) José Barresi	Honda	Retirement	
Ret	(United Kingdom) Niall Mackenzie	Aprilia	Retirement	
Ret	(Germany) Bernd Kassner	Aprilia	Retirement	
Ret	(France) Jean-Michel Bayle	Aprilia	Retirement	
Ret	(Italy) Alessandro Gramigni	Honda	Retirement	
Ret	(Germany) Adolf Stadler	Aprilia	Retirement	
Ret	(Spain) Gregorio Lavilla	Honda	Retirement	
Ret	(Spain) Sete Gibernau	Honda	Retirement	
Ret	(France) Regis Laconi	Honda	Retirement	
Ret	(Spain) Ruben Xaus	Honda	Retirement	

== 125 cc classification ==
Pos	Rider	Manufacturer	Time/Retired	Points
1	(Japan) Haruchika Aoki	Honda	42:29.704	25
2	(Spain) Emilio Alzamora	Honda	+0.158	20
3	(Japan) Tomomi Manako	Honda	+0.718	16
4	(Japan) Kazuto Sakata	Aprilia	+0.974	13
5	(Germany) Dirk Raudies	Honda	+9.361	11
6	(Japan) Yoshiaki Katoh	Yamaha	+18.666	10
7	(Japan) Akira Saito	Honda	+18.966	9
8	(Japan) Masaki Tokudome	Aprilia	+19.028	8
9	(United Kingdom) Darren Barton	Yamaha	+23.302	7
10	(Italy) Stefano Perugini	Aprilia	+40.598	6
11	(Germany) Oliver Koch	Aprilia	+41.324	5
12	(Japan) Hideyuki Nakajo	Honda	+48.079	4
13	(Italy) Luigi Ancona	Honda	+48.200	3
14	(Italy) Andrea Ballerini	Aprilia	+48.312	2
15	(Germany) Stefan Prein	Honda	+1:13.560	1
16	(Spain) José David de Gea	Honda	+1:13.568	
17	(Italy) Gabriele Debbia	Yamaha	+1:24.509	
18	(Germany) Alexander Folger	Aprilia	+1:34.108	
19	(Spain) Enrique Maturana	Yamaha	+1:34.148	
20	(Japan) Hiroyuki Kikuchi	Honda	+1:35.190	
21	(France) Bernard Garcia	Honda	+1:55.085	
22	(Japan) Ken Miyasaka	Honda	+2:03.134	
Ret	(Japan) Takehiro Yamamoto	Honda	Retirement	
Ret	(Japan) Yoshiyuki Sugai	Honda	Retirement	
Ret	(Spain) Luis Alvaro	Honda	Retirement	
Ret	(Spain) Jorge Martinez	Yamaha	Retirement	
Ret	(Italy) Massimo d'Agnano	Aprilia	Retirement	
Ret	(Germany) Peter Öttl	Aprilia	Retirement	
Ret	(Japan) Tomoko Igata	Honda	Retirement	
Ret	(Japan) Noboru Ueda	Honda	Retirement	
Ret	(Germany) Manfred Geissler	Aprilia	Retirement	
Ret	(Italy) Gianluigi Scalvini	Aprilia	Retirement	
Ret	(Spain) Herri Torrontegui	Honda	Retirement	

Previous race: 1995 Argentine Grand Prix	FIM Grand Prix World Championship; 1995 season	Next race: 1996 Malaysian Grand Prix
Previous race: 1994 European Grand Prix	European Grand Prix	Next race: 2020 European Grand Prix
