= 1995 British motorcycle Grand Prix =

(United Kingdom) 1995 British Grand Prix
Race details
- Race 9 of 13 races in the 1995 Grand Prix motorcycle racing season
- Date: 23 July 1995
- Official name: British Grand Prix
- Location: Donington Park
- Course: Permanent racing facility; 4.023 km (2.500 mi)

MotoGP
Pole position
- Rider: (Australia) Mick Doohan
- Time: 1:33.701
Fastest lap
- Rider: (Australia) Mick Doohan
- Time: 1:33.693
Podium
- First: (Australia) Mick Doohan
- Second: (Australia) Daryl Beattie
- Third: (Spain) Àlex Crivillé

250cc
Pole position
- Rider: (Italy) Max Biaggi
- Time: 1:35.122
Fastest lap
- Rider: (Italy) Max Biaggi
- Time: 1:35.437
Podium
- First: (Italy) Max Biaggi
- Second: (Japan) Tetsuya Harada
- Third: (Germany) Ralf Waldmann

125cc
Pole position
- Rider: (Italy) Stefano Perugini
- Time: 1:40.640
Fastest lap
- Rider: (Italy) Stefano Perugini
- Time: 1:40.647
Podium
- First: (Japan) Kazuto Sakata
- Second: (Italy) Stefano Perugini
- Third: (Spain) Emilio Alzamora

The 1995 British motorcycle Grand Prix was the ninth round of the 1995 Grand Prix motorcycle racing season. It took place on 23 July 1995 at the Donington Park circuit.

== 500 cc classification ==
Pos.	Rider	Team	Manufacturer	Time/Retired	Points
1	(Australia) Mick Doohan	Repsol YPF Honda Team	Honda	47:28.502	25
2	(Australia) Daryl Beattie	Lucky Strike Suzuki	Suzuki	+4.285	20
3	(Spain) Àlex Crivillé	Repsol YPF Honda Team	Honda	+22.192	16
4	(Italy) Loris Capirossi	Marlboro Team Pileri	Honda	+37.296	13
5	(Italy) Luca Cadalora	Marlboro Team Roberts	Yamaha	+40.413	11
6	(Japan) Shinichi Itoh	Repsol YPF Honda Team	Honda	+46.131	10
7	(United Kingdom) Neil Hodgson	World Championship Motorsports	ROC Yamaha	+58.509	9
8	(Spain) Juan Borja	Team ROC NRJ	ROC Yamaha	+59.330	8
9	(France) Bernard Garcia	Team ROC NRJ	ROC Yamaha	+1:01.432	7
10	(Switzerland) Adrien Bosshard	Thommen Elf Racing	ROC Yamaha	+1:30.753	6
11	(Japan) Toshiyuki Arakaki	Padgett's-Tube Riders	Harris Yamaha	+1:30.868	5
12	(France) Bruno Bonhuil	MTD	ROC Yamaha	+1:36.608	4
13	(United Kingdom) Sean Emmett	Harris Grand Prix	Harris Yamaha	+1:37.132	3
14	(United Kingdom) Eugene McManus	Padgett's Racing Team	Harris Yamaha	+1:37.636	2
15	(United Kingdom) Chris Walker	Padgett's Racing Team	Harris Yamaha	+1 Lap	1
16	(France) Frederic Protat	FP Racing	ROC Yamaha	+1 Lap	
17	(Switzerland) Bernard Haenggeli	Haenggeli Racing	ROC Yamaha	+1 Lap	
18	(Japan) Norifumi Abe	Marlboro Team Roberts	Yamaha	+3 Laps	
Ret	(Italy) Lucio Pedercini	Team Pedercini	ROC Yamaha	Retirement	
Ret	(United States) Scott Gray	Starsport	Harris Yamaha	Retirement	
Ret	(Italy) Cristiano Migliorati	Harris Grand Prix	Harris Yamaha	Retirement	
Ret	(Spain) Carlos Checa	Fortuna Honda Pons	Honda	Retirement	
Ret	(United Kingdom) James Haydon	Harris Grand Prix	Harris Yamaha	Retirement	
Ret	(France) Marc Garcia	DR Team Shark	ROC Yamaha	Retirement	
Ret	(United Kingdom) Jeremy McWilliams	Millar Racing	Yamaha	Retirement	
Ret	(Italy) Loris Reggiani	Aprilia Racing Team	Aprilia	Retirement	
Ret	(Italy) Marco Papa	Team Marco Papa	ROC Yamaha	Retirement	
Ret	(Brazil) Alex Barros	Kanemoto Honda	Honda	Retirement	
DNS	(United States) Scott Russell	Lucky Strike Suzuki	Suzuki	Did not start	
DNS	(France) Jean Pierre Jeandat	JPJ Paton	Paton	Did not start	
DNS	(United Kingdom) James Whitham	Team ROC Yamaha	ROC Yamaha	Did not start	

== 250 cc classification ==
Pos	Rider	Manufacturer	Time/Retired	Points
1	(Italy) Max Biaggi	Aprilia	43:14.102	25
2	(Japan) Tetsuya Harada	Yamaha	+2.848	20
3	(Germany) Ralf Waldmann	Honda	+2.920	16
4	(France) Olivier Jacque	Honda	+19.798	13
5	(France) Jean Philippe Ruggia	Honda	+20.722	11
6	(United Kingdom) Niall Mackenzie	Aprilia	+27.054	10
7	(Netherlands) Jurgen vd Goorbergh	Honda	+27.870	9
8	(Japan) Tadayuki Okada	Honda	+30.096	8
9	(Switzerland) Eskil Suter	Aprilia	+44.450	7
10	(Japan) Nobuatsu Aoki	Honda	+44.646	6
11	(Spain) Luis d'Antin	Honda	+45.172	5
12	(Germany) Jürgen Fuchs	Honda	+45.580	4
13	(Japan) Takeshi Tsujimura	Honda	+47.494	3
14	(Italy) Roberto Locatelli	Aprilia	+47.588	2
15	(France) Regis Laconi	Honda	+59.654	1
16	(Spain) José Luis Cardoso	Aprilia	+59.812	
17	(United Kingdom) Jamie Robinson	Harris Yamaha	+1:05.850	
18	(Germany) Adolf Stadler	Aprilia	+1:11.398	
19	(Japan) Sadanori Hikita	Honda	+1:18.324	
20	(Switzerland) Olivier Petrucciani	Aprilia	+1:20.790	
21	(United Kingdom) Chris Walker	Honda	+1:23.716	
22	(Spain) Gregorio Lavilla	Honda	+1:23.861	
23	(Spain) Luis Maurel	Honda	+1:37.587	
24	(United Kingdom) Scott Smart	Honda	+1 Lap	
Ret	(Spain) Miguel Angel Castilla	Honda	Retirement	
Ret	(Spain) Pere Riba	Aprilia	Retirement	
Ret	(South Africa) Gavin Ramsay	Aprilia	Retirement	
Ret	(Germany) Bernd Kassner	Aprilia	Retirement	
Ret	(Netherlands) Patrick vd Goorbergh	Aprilia	Retirement	
Ret	(France) Jean-Michel Bayle	Aprilia	Retirement	
Ret	(Spain) Ruben Xaus	Honda	Retirement	
Ret	(United States) Kenny Roberts Jr	Yamaha	Retirement	

== 125 cc classification ==
Pos	Rider	Manufacturer	Time/Retired	Points
1	(Japan) Kazuto Sakata	Aprilia	44:06.180	25
2	(Italy) Stefano Perugini	Aprilia	+3.151	20
3	(Spain) Emilio Alzamora	Honda	+5.563	16
4	(Germany) Dirk Raudies	Honda	+7.766	13
5	(Japan) Hideyuki Nakajo	Honda	+20.560	11
6	(Japan) Masaki Tokudome	Aprilia	+26.934	10
7	(Germany) Manfred Geissler	Aprilia	+27.232	9
8	(Spain) Jorge Martinez	Yamaha	+27.604	8
9	(United Kingdom) Darren Barton	Yamaha	+28.318	7
10	(Japan) Takehiro Yamamoto	Honda	+28.547	6
11	(Germany) Oliver Koch	Aprilia	+29.088	5
12	(Spain) Herri Torrontegui	Honda	+30.370	4
13	(Italy) Gabriele Debbia	Yamaha	+33.437	3
14	(Japan) Ken Miyasaka	Honda	+39.257	2
15	(Italy) Luigi Ancona	Honda	+39.276	1
16	(Japan) Tomoko Igata	Honda	+1:09.491	
17	(Japan) Hiroyuki Kikuchi	Honda	+1:10.576	
18	(Japan) Yoshiyuki Sugai	Honda	+1:10.856	
19	(United Kingdom) Steve Patrickson	Honda	+1:30.176	
20	(Italy) Massimo d'Agnano	Aprilia	+1:31.186	
21	(United Kingdom) Pete Jennings	Honda	+1 Lap	
22	(Germany) Stefan Kurfiss	Yamaha	+1 Lap	
23	(Germany) Christian Kellner	Yamaha	+1 Lap	
Ret	(Italy) Vittorio Lopez	Aprilia	Retirement	
Ret	(Japan) Yoshiaki Katoh	Yamaha	Retirement	
Ret	(Italy) Gianluigi Scalvini	Aprilia	Retirement	
Ret	(Japan) Noboru Ueda	Honda	Retirement	
Ret	(Spain) Josep Sarda	Honda	Retirement	
Ret	(Japan) Tomomi Manako	Honda	Retirement	
Ret	(United Kingdom) Jim Falls	Honda	Retirement	
Ret	(Italy) Andrea Ballerini	Aprilia	Retirement	
Ret	(Japan) Haruchika Aoki	Honda	Retirement	
Ret	(Japan) Akira Saito	Honda	Retirement	
Ret	(Germany) Peter Öttl	Aprilia	Retirement	

Previous race: 1995 French Grand Prix	FIM Grand Prix World Championship; 1995 season	Next race: 1995 Czech Republic Grand Prix
Previous race: 1994 British Grand Prix	British Grand Prix	Next race: 1996 British Grand Prix
