= 1995 German motorcycle Grand Prix =

(Germany) 1995 German Grand Prix
Race details
- Race 5 of 13 races in the 1995 Grand Prix motorcycle racing season
- Date: 21 May 1995
- Official name: Grand Prix Deutschland
- Location: Nürburgring
- Course: Permanent racing facility; 4.556 km (2.831 mi)

MotoGP
Pole position
- Rider: (Australia) Mick Doohan
- Time: 1:40.437
Fastest lap
- Rider: (Australia) Mick Doohan
- Time: 1:41.084
Podium
- First: (Australia) Daryl Beattie
- Second: (Italy) Luca Cadalora
- Third: (Japan) Shinichi Itoh

250cc
Pole position
- Rider: (Italy) Max Biaggi
- Time: 1:43.222
Fastest lap
- Rider: (Italy) Max Biaggi
- Time: 1:43.322
Podium
- First: (Italy) Max Biaggi
- Second: (Japan) Tetsuya Harada
- Third: (Japan) Tadayuki Okada

125cc
Pole position
- Rider: (Japan) Kazuto Sakata
- Time: 1:50.188
Fastest lap
- Rider: (Japan) Akira Saito
- Time: 1:49.737
Podium
- First: (Japan) Haruchika Aoki
- Second: (Japan) Noboru Ueda
- Third: (Spain) Emilio Alzamora

The 1995 German motorcycle Grand Prix was the fifth round of the 1995 Grand Prix motorcycle racing season. It took place on 21 May 1995 at the Nürburgring.

== 500 cc classification ==
Pos.	Rider	Team	Manufacturer	Time/Retired	Points
1	(Australia) Daryl Beattie	Lucky Strike Suzuki	Suzuki	46:01.392	25
2	(Italy) Luca Cadalora	Marlboro Team Roberts	Yamaha	+9.874	20
3	(Japan) Shinichi Itoh	Repsol YPF Honda Team	Honda	+9.967	16
4	(Spain) Àlex Crivillé	Repsol YPF Honda Team	Honda	+11.706	13
5	(Spain) Alberto Puig	Fortuna Honda Pons	Honda	+12.399	11
6	(Italy) Loris Capirossi	Marlboro Team Pileri	Honda	+25.780	10
7	(Brazil) Alex Barros	Kanemoto Honda	Honda	+33.342	9
8	(Japan) Norifumi Abe	Marlboro Team Roberts	Yamaha	+33.787	8
9	(Italy) Loris Reggiani	Aprilia Racing Team	Aprilia	+52.853	7
10	(Spain) Juan Borja	Team ROC NRJ	ROC Yamaha	+1:02.666	6
11	(Italy) Cristiano Migliorati	Harris Grand Prix	Harris Yamaha	+1:23.016	5
12	(Switzerland) Adrien Bosshard	Thommen Elf Racing	ROC Yamaha	+1:32.101	4
13	(Belgium) Laurent Naveau	Team ROC	ROC Yamaha	+1:33.379	3
14	(United Kingdom) Neil Hodgson	World Championship Motorsports	ROC Yamaha	+1:35.056	2
15	(France) Jean Pierre Jeandat	JPJ Paton	Paton	+1:36.902	1
16	(France) Marc Garcia	DR Team Shark	ROC Yamaha	+1:44.563	
17	(France) Bernard Garcia	Team ROC NRJ	ROC Yamaha	+1:47.906	
18	(France) Frederic Protat	FP Racing	ROC Yamaha	+1 Lap	
19	(France) Bruno Bonhuil	MTD	ROC Yamaha	+1 Lap	
20	(Switzerland) Nicholas Schmassman	Team Schmassman	ROC Yamaha	+1 Lap	
21	(United Kingdom) Eugene McManus	Padgett's Racing Team	Harris Yamaha	+1 Lap	
Ret	(United States) Scott Gray	Starsport	ROC Yamaha	Retirement	
Ret	(Italy) Lucio Pedercini	Team Pedercini	ROC Yamaha	Retirement	
Ret	(Switzerland) Bernard Haenggeli	Haenggeli Racing	ROC Yamaha	Retirement	
Ret	(Australia) Mick Doohan	Repsol YPF Honda Team	Honda	Retirement	
Ret	(New Zealand) Andrew Stroud	Team Max	ROC Yamaha	Retirement	
Ret	(United Kingdom) James Haydon	Harris Grand Prix	Harris Yamaha	Retirement	
Ret	(Venezuela) Antonio Irizar	Harris Grand Prix	Harris Yamaha	Retirement	
Ret	(United Kingdom) Jeremy McWilliams	Millar Racing	Harris Yamaha	Retirement	
DNS	(Japan) Toshiyuki Arakaki	Padgett's-Tube Riders	Harris Yamaha	Did not start	
DNS	(Germany) Hans Wieser	Hans Wieser	Yamaha	Did not start	
DNS	(United Kingdom) Sean Emmett	Harris Grand Prix	Harris Yamaha	Did not start	

== 250 cc classification ==
Pos	Rider	Manufacturer	Time/Retired	Points
1	(Italy) Max Biaggi	Aprilia	43:39.378	25
2	(Japan) Tetsuya Harada	Yamaha	+1.608	20
3	(Japan) Tadayuki Okada	Honda	+9.620	16
4	(United States) Kenny Roberts Jr	Yamaha	+9.870	13
5	(France) Jean Philippe Ruggia	Honda	+10.408	11
6	(France) Jean-Michel Bayle	Aprilia	+10.700	10
7	(Spain) Carlos Checa	Honda	+22.982	9
8	(Japan) Nobuatsu Aoki	Honda	+23.115	8
9	(Spain) Luis d'Antin	Honda	+23.254	7
10	(Italy) Marcellino Lucchi	Aprilia	+25.152	6
11	(France) Olivier Jacque	Honda	+32.624	5
12	(Netherlands) Jurgen vd Goorbergh	Honda	+32.741	4
13	(Netherlands) Patrick vd Goorbergh	Aprilia	+47.716	3
14	(United Kingdom) Niall Mackenzie	Aprilia	+47.872	2
15	(Japan) Sadanori Hikita	Honda	+51.956	1
16	(Germany) Adolf Stadler	Aprilia	+1:03.825	
17	(Spain) José Luis Cardoso	Aprilia	+1:07.028	
18	(Spain) Gregorio Lavilla	Honda	+1:16.504	
19	(Spain) Francisco Padro	Aprilia	+1 Lap	
20	(Spain) Miguel Angel Castilla	Yamaha	+1 Lap	
21	(Switzerland) Markus Gemperle	Aprilia	+1 Lap	
22	(Germany) Matthias Neukirchen	Yamaha	+1 Lap	
Ret	(Germany) Jurgen Oelschlager	Honda	Retirement	
Ret	(Switzerland) Eskil Suter	Aprilia	Retirement	
Ret	(Spain) Luis Maurel	Honda	Retirement	
Ret	(Switzerland) Olivier Petrucciani	Aprilia	Retirement	
Ret	(Germany) Bernd Kassner	Aprilia	Retirement	
Ret	(France) Regis Laconi	Honda	Retirement	
Ret	(Germany) Ralf Waldmann	Honda	Retirement	
Ret	(Germany) Jürgen Fuchs	Honda	Retirement	

== 125 cc classification ==
Pos	Rider	Manufacturer	Time/Retired	Points
1	(Japan) Haruchika Aoki	Honda	42:40.574	25
2	(Japan) Noboru Ueda	Honda	+0.671	20
3	(Spain) Emilio Alzamora	Honda	+2.057	16
4	(Italy) Stefano Perugini	Aprilia	+11.688	13
5	(Germany) Dirk Raudies	Honda	+15.473	11
6	(Japan) Hideyuki Nakajo	Honda	+25.742	10
7	(Germany) Manfred Geissler	Aprilia	+31.952	9
8	(Japan) Ken Miyasaka	Honda	+32.005	8
9	(Japan) Tomomi Manako	Honda	+44.698	7
10	(Italy) Gianluigi Scalvini	Aprilia	+46.730	6
11	(Japan) Yoshiaki Katoh	Yamaha	+56.232	5
12	(Italy) Luigi Ancona	Honda	+1:05.027	4
13	(Japan) Takehiro Yamamoto	Honda	+1:09.131	3
14	(Japan) Yoshiyuki Sugai	Honda	+1:15.182	2
15	(Germany) Stefan Kurfiss	Yamaha	+1 Lap	1
Ret	(Switzerland) Ivan Tschudin	Honda	Retirement	
Ret	(Germany) Alexander Folger	Aprilia	Retirement	
Ret	(Japan) Akira Saito	Honda	Retirement	
Ret	(Germany) Frank Baldinger	Honda	Retirement	
Ret	(Germany) Stefan Prein	Yamaha	Retirement	
Ret	(Germany) Maik Stief	Yamaha	Retirement	
Ret	(Spain) Armando Lopez	Aprilia	Retirement	
Ret	(Japan) Hiroyuki Kikuchi	Honda	Retirement	
Ret	(Japan) Kazuto Sakata	Aprilia	Retirement	
Ret	(Spain) Herri Torrontegui	Honda	Retirement	
Ret	(Japan) Masaki Tokudome	Aprilia	Retirement	
Ret	(Japan) Tomoko Igata	Honda	Retirement	
Ret	(Netherlands) Loek Bodelier	Aprilia	Retirement	
Ret	(Spain) Jorge Martinez	Yamaha	Retirement	
Ret	(Italy) Gabriele Debbia	Yamaha	Retirement	

Previous race: 1995 Spanish Grand Prix	FIM Grand Prix World Championship; 1995 season	Next race: 1995 Italian Grand Prix
Previous race: 1994 German Grand Prix	German Grand Prix	Next race: 1996 German Grand Prix
