= 1995 Malaysian motorcycle Grand Prix =

(Malaysia) 1995 Malaysian Grand Prix
Race details
- Race 2 of 13 races in the 1995 Grand Prix motorcycle racing season
- Date: 2 April 1995
- Official name: Marlboro Grand Prix of Malaysia
- Location: Shah Alam Circuit
- Course: Permanent racing facility; 3.505 km (2.178 mi)

MotoGP
Pole position
- Rider: (Australia) Mick Doohan
- Time: 1:25.059
Fastest lap
- Rider: (Australia) Mick Doohan
- Time: 1:26.090
Podium
- First: (Australia) Mick Doohan
- Second: (Australia) Daryl Beattie
- Third: (Spain) Àlex Crivillé

250cc
Pole position
- Rider: (Italy) Max Biaggi
- Time: 1:25.939
Fastest lap
- Rider: (Italy) Max Biaggi
- Time: 1:26.679
Podium
- First: (Italy) Max Biaggi
- Second: (Japan) Tetsuya Harada
- Third: (Japan) Tadayuki Okada

125cc
Pole position
- Rider: (Japan) Haruchika Aoki
- Time: 1:31.144
Fastest lap
- Rider: (Italy) Stefano Perugini
- Time: 1:42.972
Podium
- First: (Australia) Garry McCoy
- Second: (Italy) Stefano Perugini
- Third: (Japan) Akira Saito

The 1995 Malaysian motorcycle Grand Prix was the second round of the 1995 Grand Prix motorcycle racing season. It took place on 2 April 1995 at the Shah Alam Circuit.

== 500 cc classification ==
Pos.	Rider	Team	Manufacturer	Time/Retired	Points
1	(Australia) Mick Doohan	Repsol YPF Honda Team	Honda	47:54.380	25
2	(Australia) Daryl Beattie	Lucky Strike Suzuki	Suzuki	+6.799	20
3	(Spain) Àlex Crivillé	Repsol YPF Honda Team	Honda	+10.107	16
4	(United States) Kevin Schwantz	Lucky Strike Suzuki	Suzuki	+14.144	13
5	(Spain) Alberto Puig	Fortuna Honda Pons	Honda	+15.238	11
6	(Brazil) Alex Barros	Kanemoto Honda	Honda	+15.304	10
7	(Japan) Shinichi Itoh	Repsol YPF Honda Team	Honda	+15.536	9
8	(Italy) Loris Reggiani	Aprilia Racing Team	Aprilia	+17.976	8
9	(Spain) Juan Borja	Team ROC NRJ	ROC Yamaha	+55.786	7
10	(France) Bernard Garcia	Team ROC NRJ	ROC Yamaha	+56.144	6
11	(France) Frederic Protat	FP Racing	ROC Yamaha	+1:22.200	5
12	(Italy) Cristiano Migliorati	Harris Grand Prix	Harris Yamaha	+1:26.909	4
13	(France) Marc Garcia	DR Team Shark	ROC Yamaha	+1:51.774	3
14	(United Kingdom) Jeremy McWilliams	Millar Racing	Yamaha	+1 Lap	2
15	(New Zealand) Andrew Stroud	Team Max	ROC Yamaha	+1 Lap	1
16	(Switzerland) Bernard Haenggeli	Haenggeli Racing	ROC Yamaha	+1 Lap	
17	(France) Bruno Bonhuil	MTD	ROC Yamaha	+1 Lap	
18	(United Kingdom) Jamie Robinson	Padgett's Racing Team	Harris Yamaha	+1 Lap	
19	(France) Jean Pierre Jeandat	JPJ Paton	Paton	+1 Lap	
Ret	(United Kingdom) Eugene McManus	Padgett's Racing Team	Harris Yamaha	Retirement	
Ret	(Japan) Norifumi Abe	Marlboro Team Roberts	Yamaha	Retirement	
Ret	(United Kingdom) Neil Hodgson	World Championship Motorsports	ROC Yamaha	Retirement	
Ret	(Italy) Luca Cadalora	Marlboro Team Roberts	Yamaha	Retirement	
Ret	(Belgium) Laurent Naveau	Team ROC	ROC Yamaha	Retirement	
Ret	(Switzerland) Adrien Bosshard	Thommen Elf Racing	ROC Yamaha	Retirement	
Ret	(United States) Scott Gray	Starsport	ROC Yamaha	Retirement	
Ret	(United Kingdom) Sean Emmett	Harris Grand Prix	Harris Yamaha	Retirement	
Ret	(United Kingdom) James Haydon	Harris Grand Prix	Yamaha	Retirement	
Ret	(Italy) Loris Capirossi	Marlboro Team Pileri	Honda	Retirement	
DNS	(Italy) Lucio Pedercini	Team Pedercini	ROC Yamaha	Did not start	

== 250 cc classification ==
Pos	Rider	Manufacturer	Time/Retired	Points
1	(Italy) Max Biaggi	Aprilia	45:27.292	25
2	(Japan) Tetsuya Harada	Yamaha	+5.084	20
3	(Japan) Tadayuki Okada	Honda	+5.821	16
4	(Germany) Ralf Waldmann	Honda	+9.188	13
5	(France) Jean Philippe Ruggia	Honda	+9.374	11
6	(France) Jean-Michel Bayle	Aprilia	+34.638	10
7	(Japan) Nobuatsu Aoki	Honda	+37.606	9
8	(Spain) Luis d'Antin	Honda	+40.350	8
9	(United States) Kenny Roberts Jr	Yamaha	+40.612	7
10	(France) Olivier Jacque	Honda	+43.993	6
11	(Netherlands) Jurgen vd Goorbergh	Honda	+55.397	5
12	(Switzerland) Eskil Suter	Aprilia	+1:02.421	4
13	(Spain) José Luis Cardoso	Aprilia	+1:05.033	3
14	(Canada) Colin Zhang	Aprilia	+1:08.478	2
15	(Switzerland) Olivier Petrucciani	Aprilia	+1:12.802	1
16	(Germany) Adolf Stadler	Aprilia	+1:13.848	
17	(Germany) Jürgen Fuchs	Honda	+1:14.003	
18	(Japan) Takeshi Tsujimura	Honda	+1:19.112	
19	(Italy) Davide Bulega	Honda	+1:24.717	
20	(Japan) Sadanori Hikita	Honda	+1:24.720	
21	(France) Regis Laconi	Honda	+1 Lap	
22	(Spain) Gregorio Lavilla	Honda	+1 Lap	
23	(Germany) Bernd Kassner	Aprilia	+1 Lap	
24	(Spain) Pere Riba	Aprilia	+1 Lap	
Ret	(Spain) Luis Maurel	Honda	Retirement	
Ret	(Spain) Miguel Angel Castilla	Yamaha	Retirement	
Ret	(Malaysia) Shahrun Nizam	Yamaha	Retirement	
Ret	(United Kingdom) Niall Mackenzie	Aprilia	Retirement	
Ret	(Italy) Doriano Romboni	Honda	Retirement	

== 125 cc classification ==
Pos	Rider	Manufacturer	Time/Retired	Points
1	(Australia) Garry McCoy	Honda	21:18.350	12.5
2	(Italy) Stefano Perugini	Aprilia	+0.427	10
3	(Japan) Akira Saito	Honda	+6.334	8
4	(Spain) Herri Torrontegui	Honda	+9.810	6.5
5	(Italy) Andrea Ballerini	Aprilia	+10.295	5.5
6	(Japan) Takehiro Yamamoto	Honda	+10.584	5
7	(Germany) Dirk Raudies	Honda	+14.784	4.5
8	(Japan) Tomoko Igata	Honda	+15.184	4
9	(Italy) Gabriele Debbia	Yamaha	+22.437	3.5
10	(Japan) Kazuto Sakata	Aprilia	+29.399	3
11	(Italy) Gianluigi Scalvini	Aprilia	+30.996	2.5
12	(Japan) Hideyuki Nakajo	Honda	+37.644	2
13	(Japan) Ken Miyasaka	Honda	+37.984	1.5
14	(Germany) Stefan Prein	Yamaha	+55.686	1
15	(Japan) Masaki Tokudome	Aprilia	+1:04.524	0.5
16	(Malaysia) Chee Kieong Soong	Yamaha	+1:05.831	
17	(Germany) Peter Öttl	Aprilia	+1:11.598	
18	(Japan) Haruchika Aoki	Honda	+1:11.758	
19	(Germany) Oliver Koch	Aprilia	+1:29.364	
20	(Spain) Jorge Martinez	Yamaha	+1:30.169	
21	(Japan) Noboru Ueda	Honda	+1:30.463	
22	(Japan) Tetsu Ito	Honda	+1:30.780	
23	(Spain) Emilio Alzamora	Honda	+1:53.023	
24	(Japan) Tomomi Manako	Honda	+1 Lap	
25	(Japan) Hiroyuki Kikuchi	Honda	+1 Lap	
26	(Italy) Ivan Cremonini	Honda	+1 Lap	
Ret	(Japan) Yoshiaki Katoh	Yamaha	Retirement	
Ret	(Spain) Armando Lopez	Aprilia	Retirement	
Ret	(Germany) Stefan Kurfiss	Yamaha	Retirement	
Ret	(Netherlands) Loek Bodelier	Aprilia	Retirement	
Ret	(Germany) Manfred Geissler	Aprilia	Retirement	

== Notes ==
- The 125cc race was stopped after 12 laps and therefore only half points were given.

Previous race: 1995 Australian Grand Prix	FIM Grand Prix World Championship; 1995 season	Next race: 1995 Japanese Grand Prix
Previous race: 1994 Malaysian Grand Prix	Malaysian Grand Prix	Next race: 1996 Malaysian Grand Prix
