= 1995 French motorcycle Grand Prix =

(France) 1995 French Grand Prix
Race details
- Race 8 of 13 races in the 1995 Grand Prix motorcycle racing season
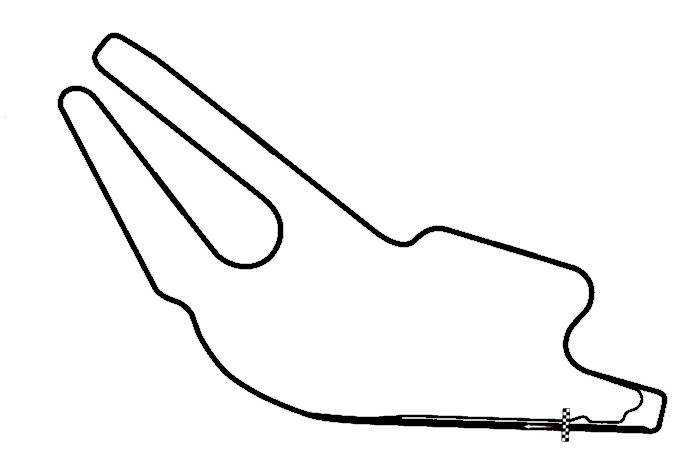
- Date: 9 July 1995
- Official name: Grand Prix de France
- Location: Bugatti Circuit
- Course: Permanent racing facility; 4.430 km (2.753 mi)

MotoGP
Pole position
- Rider: (Australia) Mick Doohan
- Time: 1:40.759
Fastest lap
- Rider: (Australia) Mick Doohan
- Time: 1:41.850
Podium
- First: (Australia) Mick Doohan
- Second: (Italy) Luca Cadalora
- Third: (Australia) Daryl Beattie

250cc
Pole position
- Rider: (Italy) Max Biaggi
- Time: 1:43.517
Fastest lap
- Rider: (Germany) Ralf Waldmann
- Time: 1:43.880
Podium
- First: (Germany) Ralf Waldmann
- Second: (Italy) Max Biaggi
- Third: (Japan) Tadayuki Okada

125cc
Pole position
- Rider: (Japan) Haruchika Aoki
- Time: 1:49.605
Fastest lap
- Rider: (Germany) Peter Öttl
- Time: 1:50.477
Podium
- First: (Japan) Haruchika Aoki
- Second: (Germany) Dirk Raudies
- Third: (Germany) Peter Öttl

The 1995 French motorcycle Grand Prix was the eighth round of the 1995 Grand Prix motorcycle racing season. It took place on 9 July 1995 at the Bugatti Circuit located in Le Mans, France.

== 500 cc classification ==
Pos.	Rider	Team	Manufacturer	Time/Retired	Points
1	(Australia) Mick Doohan	Repsol YPF Honda Team	Honda	46:10.991	25
2	(Italy) Luca Cadalora	Marlboro Team Roberts	Yamaha	+21.923	20
3	(Australia) Daryl Beattie	Lucky Strike Suzuki	Suzuki	+23.607	16
4	(Japan) Shinichi Itoh	Repsol YPF Honda Team	Honda	+39.623	13
5	(Brazil) Alex Barros	Kanemoto Honda	Honda	+51.700	11
6	(United States) Scott Russell	Lucky Strike Suzuki	Suzuki	+1:19.276	10
7	(United Kingdom) Jeremy McWilliams	Millar Racing	Yamaha	+1:20.553	9
8	(United Kingdom) Neil Hodgson	World Championship Motorsports	ROC Yamaha	+1:32.235	8
9	(Japan) Toshiyuki Arakaki	Padgett's-Tube Riders	Harris Yamaha	+1:39.228	7
10	(Belgium) Laurent Naveau	Team ROC	Yamaha	+1:39.421	6
11	(Switzerland) Adrien Bosshard	Thommen Elf Racing	ROC Yamaha	+1:40.461	5
12	(France) Frederic Protat	FP Racing	ROC Yamaha	+1 Lap	4
13	(France) Marc Garcia	DR Team Shark	ROC Yamaha	+1 Lap	3
14	(Switzerland) Bernard Haenggeli	Haenggeli Racing	ROC Yamaha	+1 Lap	2
15	(France) Pierre Monneret	Team ROC Yamaha	ROC Yamaha	+1 Lap	1
16	(France) Bruno Bonhuil	MTD	ROC Yamaha	+1 Lap	
17	(United States) Scott Gray	Starsport	Harris Yamaha	+1 Lap	
Ret	(United Kingdom) Sean Emmett	Harris Grand Prix	Harris Yamaha	Retirement	
Ret	(Italy) Marco Papa	Team Marco Papa	ROC Yamaha	Retirement	
Ret	(Italy) Lucio Pedercini	Team Pedercini	ROC Yamaha	Retirement	
Ret	(Italy) Cristiano Migliorati	Harris Grand Prix	Harris Yamaha	Retirement	
Ret	(France) Bernard Garcia	Team ROC NRJ	ROC Yamaha	Retirement	
Ret	(United Kingdom) James Haydon	Harris Grand Prix	Harris Yamaha	Retirement	
Ret	(Japan) Norifumi Abe	Marlboro Team Roberts	Yamaha	Retirement	
Ret	(France) Jean Pierre Jeandat	JPJ Paton	Paton	Retirement	
Ret	(Spain) Juan Borja	Team ROC NRJ	ROC Yamaha	Retirement	
Ret	(United Kingdom) Eugene McManus	Padgett's Racing Team	Harris Yamaha	Retirement	
Ret	(Italy) Loris Reggiani	Aprilia Racing Team	Aprilia	Retirement	
Ret	(Spain) Àlex Crivillé	Repsol YPF Honda Team	Honda	Retirement	
DNS	(Spain) Alberto Puig	Fortuna Honda Pons	Honda	Did not start	
DNS	(Italy) Loris Capirossi	Marlboro Team Pileri	Honda	Did not start	

== 250 cc classification ==
Pos	Rider	Manufacturer	Time/Retired	Points
1	(Germany) Ralf Waldmann	Honda	43:39.063	25
2	(Italy) Max Biaggi	Aprilia	+0.551	20
3	(Japan) Tadayuki Okada	Honda	+7.175	16
4	(Spain) Carlos Checa	Honda	+12.907	13
5	(Japan) Tetsuya Harada	Yamaha	+25.999	11
6	(United States) Kenny Roberts Jr	Yamaha	+28.457	10
7	(Spain) Luis d'Antin	Honda	+29.217	9
8	(France) Jean Philippe Ruggia	Honda	+30.108	8
9	(France) Olivier Jacque	Honda	+40.453	7
10	(Switzerland) Eskil Suter	Aprilia	+46.661	6
11	(France) Jean-Michel Bayle	Aprilia	+48.237	5
12	(Germany) Jürgen Fuchs	Honda	+48.500	4
13	(Netherlands) Patrick vd Goorbergh	Aprilia	+50.793	3
14	(Netherlands) Jurgen vd Goorbergh	Honda	+1:00.231	2
15	(Italy) Alessandro Gramigni	Honda	+1:14.121	1
16	(Germany) Adolf Stadler	Aprilia	+1:28.644	
17	(Spain) Luis Maurel	Honda	+1:31.803	
18	(Spain) Gregorio Lavilla	Honda	+1:34.599	
19	(United Kingdom) Niall Mackenzie	Aprilia	+1:36.137	
20	(Switzerland) Olivier Petrucciani	Aprilia	+1:37.617	
21	(France) Florian Ferracci	Aprilia	+1:48.209	
Ret	(Spain) Miguel Angel Castilla	Yamaha	Retirement	
Ret	(Spain) Pere Riba	Aprilia	Retirement	
Ret	(Japan) Sadanori Hikita	Honda	Retirement	
Ret	(Germany) Bernd Kassner	Aprilia	Retirement	
Ret	(France) Regis Laconi	Honda	Retirement	
Ret	(Italy) Doriano Romboni	Honda	Retirement	
Ret	(Spain) José Luis Cardoso	Aprilia	Retirement	
Ret	(Japan) Nobuatsu Aoki	Honda	Retirement	
Ret	(Japan) Takeshi Tsujimura	Honda	Retirement	

== 125 cc classification ==
Pos	Rider	Manufacturer	Time/Retired	Points
1	(Japan) Haruchika Aoki	Honda	42:52.844	25
2	(Germany) Dirk Raudies	Honda	+1.045	20
3	(Germany) Peter Öttl	Aprilia	+1.652	16
4	(Japan) Akira Saito	Honda	+7.504	13
5	(Japan) Tomomi Manako	Honda	+8.002	11
6	(Italy) Stefano Perugini	Aprilia	+9.559	10
7	(Spain) Emilio Alzamora	Honda	+9.802	9
8	(Japan) Masaki Tokudome	Aprilia	+10.007	8
9	(Japan) Yoshiaki Katoh	Yamaha	+10.524	7
10	(Spain) Herri Torrontegui	Honda	+13.757	6
11	(Japan) Hideyuki Nakajo	Honda	+20.168	5
12	(Japan) Kazuto Sakata	Aprilia	+26.688	4
13	(Japan) Tomoko Igata	Honda	+29.193	3
14	(Germany) Oliver Koch	Aprilia	+32.018	2
15	(Italy) Gabriele Debbia	Yamaha	+32.396	1
16	(Italy) Luigi Ancona	Honda	+32.696	
17	(Germany) Manfred Geissler	Aprilia	+41.900	
18	(Italy) Vittorio Lopez	Aprilia	+48.524	
19	(Japan) Takehiro Yamamoto	Honda	+1:00.308	
20	(Germany) Stefan Kurfiss	Yamaha	+1:16.779	
21	(Japan) Hiroyuki Kikuchi	Honda	+1:21.616	
22	(Italy) Stefano Cruciani	Aprilia	+1:47.262	
23	(France) Bertrand Stey	Honda	+2:14.284	
Ret	(Italy) Gianluigi Scalvini	Aprilia	Retirement	
Ret	(Japan) Yoshiyuki Sugai	Honda	Retirement	
Ret	(France) Frederic Petit	Honda	Retirement	
Ret	(Italy) Massimo d'Agnano	Aprilia	Retirement	
Ret	(Spain) Josep Sarda	Honda	Retirement	
Ret	(Japan) Ken Miyasaka	Honda	Retirement	
Ret	(Germany) Stefan Prein	Yamaha	Retirement	
Ret	(France) Cristophe Rochel	Honda	Retirement	
Ret	(France) Eric Mizera	Aprilia	Retirement	
Ret	(Japan) Noboru Ueda	Honda	Retirement	
Ret	(Spain) Jorge Martinez	Yamaha	Retirement	

Previous race: 1995 Dutch TT	FIM Grand Prix World Championship; 1995 season	Next race: 1995 British Grand Prix
Previous race: 1994 French Grand Prix	French Grand Prix	Next race: 1996 French Grand Prix
