= 1995 Spanish motorcycle Grand Prix =

(Spain) 1995 Spanish Grand Prix
Race details
- Race 4 of 13 races in the 1995 Grand Prix motorcycle racing season
- Date: 7 May 1995
- Official name: Gran Premio de España MX Onda
- Location: Circuito de Jerez
- Course: Permanent racing facility; 4.423 km (2.748 mi)

MotoGP
Pole position
- Rider: (Australia) Mick Doohan
- Time: 1:44.086
Fastest lap
- Rider: (Spain) Alberto Puig
- Time: 1:44.995
Podium
- First: (Spain) Alberto Puig
- Second: (Italy) Luca Cadalora
- Third: (Spain) Àlex Crivillé

250cc
Pole position
- Rider: (Japan) Tetsuya Harada
- Time: 1:45.458
Fastest lap
- Rider: (Japan) Tetsuya Harada
- Time: 1:45.820
Podium
- First: (Japan) Tetsuya Harada
- Second: (Italy) Max Biaggi
- Third: (Spain) Luis d'Antin

125cc
Pole position
- Rider: (Japan) Kazuto Sakata
- Time: 1:50.779
Fastest lap
- Rider: (Germany) Dirk Raudies
- Time: 1:51.044
Podium
- First: (Japan) Haruchika Aoki
- Second: (Italy) Stefano Perugini
- Third: (Germany) Dirk Raudies

The 1995 Spanish motorcycle Grand Prix was the fourth round of the 1995 Grand Prix motorcycle racing season. It took place on 7 May 1995 at the Circuito Permanente de Jerez.

== 500 cc classification ==
Pos.	Rider	Team	Manufacturer	Time/Retired	Points
1	(Spain) Alberto Puig	Fortuna Honda Pons	Honda	47:45.728	25
2	(Italy) Luca Cadalora	Marlboro Team Roberts	Yamaha	+5.093	20
3	(Spain) Àlex Crivillé	Repsol YPF Honda Team	Honda	+14.031	16
4	(Japan) Norifumi Abe	Marlboro Team Roberts	Yamaha	+14.264	13
5	(Brazil) Alex Barros	Kanemoto Honda	Honda	+22.141	11
6	(Italy) Loris Capirossi	Marlboro Team Pileri	Honda	+22.798	10
7	(Australia) Daryl Beattie	Lucky Strike Suzuki	Suzuki	+36.499	9
8	(Japan) Shinichi Itoh	Repsol YPF Honda Team	Honda	+42.741	8
9	(Spain) Juan Borja	Team ROC NRJ	ROC Yamaha	+46.492	7
10	(Italy) Cristiano Migliorati	Harris Grand Prix	Harris Yamaha	+1:18.644	6
11	(United Kingdom) Jeremy McWilliams	Millar Racing	Yamaha	+1:18.682	5
12	(United Kingdom) Neil Hodgson	World Championship Motorsports	ROC Yamaha	+1:24.628	4
13	(Belgium) Laurent Naveau	Team ROC	ROC Yamaha	+1:31.259	3
14	(United Kingdom) Eugene McManus	Padgett's Racing Team	Harris Yamaha	+1:31.947	2
15	(France) Bruno Bonhuil	MTD	ROC Yamaha	+1 Lap	1
16	(United Kingdom) Brian Morrison	Harris Grand Prix	Harris Yamaha	+1 Lap	
17	(Switzerland) Bernard Haenggeli	Haenggeli Racing	Harris Yamaha	+1 Lap	
NC	(New Zealand) Andrew Stroud	Team Max	ROC Yamaha	Not classified	
Ret	(United Kingdom) Sean Emmett	Harris Grand Prix	Harris Yamaha	Retirement	
Ret	(Italy) Lucio Pedercini	Team Pedercini	ROC Yamaha	Retirement	
Ret	(France) Bernard Garcia	Team ROC NRJ	ROC Yamaha	Retirement	
Ret	(United States) Jim Filice	Padgett's Racing Team	Harris Yamaha	Retirement	
Ret	(Australia) Mick Doohan	Repsol YPF Honda Team	Honda	Retirement	
Ret	(United Kingdom) James Haydon	Harris Grand Prix	Harris Yamaha	Retirement	
Ret	(France) Marc Garcia	DR Team Shark	ROC Yamaha	Retirement	
Ret	(France) Jean Pierre Jeandat	JPJ Paton	Paton	Retirement	
Ret	(Italy) Loris Reggiani	Aprilia Racing Team	Aprilia	Retirement	
Ret	(United States) Scott Gray	Starsport	Harris Yamaha	Retirement	
Ret	(Switzerland) Adrien Bosshard	Thommen Elf Racing	ROC Yamaha	Retirement	

== 250 cc classification ==
Pos	Rider	Manufacturer	Time/Retired	Points
1	(Japan) Tetsuya Harada	Yamaha	46:25.162	25
2	(Italy) Max Biaggi	Aprilia	+9.746	20
3	(Spain) Luis d'Antin	Honda	+9.904	16
4	(Italy) Doriano Romboni	Honda	+9.924	13
5	(Germany) Ralf Waldmann	Honda	+10.196	11
6	(Japan) Tadayuki Okada	Honda	+10.424	10
7	(France) Jean Philippe Ruggia	Honda	+15.114	9
8	(Japan) Nobuatsu Aoki	Honda	+38.755	8
9	(France) Jean-Michel Bayle	Aprilia	+41.447	7
10	(Italy) Roberto Locatelli	Aprilia	+41.863	6
11	(United Kingdom) Niall Mackenzie	Aprilia	+50.820	5
12	(France) Olivier Jacque	Honda	+51.303	4
13	(Germany) Jürgen Fuchs	Honda	+51.396	3
14	(Italy) Alessandro Gramigni	Honda	+53.216	2
15	(Switzerland) Olivier Petrucciani	Aprilia	+57.348	1
16	(Netherlands) Patrick vd Goorbergh	Aprilia	+1:04.671	
17	(Spain) José Luis Cardoso	Aprilia	+1:04.782	
18	(Germany) Adolf Stadler	Aprilia	+1:07.700	
19	(Netherlands) Jurgen vd Goorbergh	Honda	+1:10.065	
20	(France) Regis Laconi	Honda	+1:11.338	
21	(Spain) Luis Maurel	Honda	+1:12.155	
22	(Germany) Bernd Kassner	Aprilia	+1:29.293	
23	(Spain) Gregorio Lavilla	Honda	+1:30.176	
24	(Spain) Ramon Mesa	Yamaha	+1:30.275	
25	(Spain) Javier Diaz	Honda	+1 Lap	
Ret	(Spain) Carlos Checa	Honda	Retirement	
Ret	(Spain) Javier Rodríguez	Honda	Retirement	
Ret	(Switzerland) Eskil Suter	Aprilia	Retirement	
Ret	(Spain) Pere Riba	Aprilia	Retirement	
Ret	(Spain) Miguel Angel Castilla	Yamaha	Retirement	
Ret	(Japan) Sadanori Hikita	Honda	Retirement	
Ret	(United States) Kenny Roberts Jr	Yamaha	Retirement	
Ret	(Spain) Javier Marsella	Honda	Retirement	
Ret	(Japan) Takeshi Tsujimura	Honda	Retirement	

== 125 cc classification ==
Pos	Rider	Manufacturer	Time/Retired	Points
1	(Japan) Haruchika Aoki	Honda	43:01.696	25
2	(Italy) Stefano Perugini	Aprilia	+0.012	20
3	(Germany) Dirk Raudies	Honda	+0.742	16
4	(Germany) Peter Öttl	Aprilia	+3.262	13
5	(Japan) Noboru Ueda	Honda	+3.416	11
6	(Japan) Kazuto Sakata	Aprilia	+3.952	10
7	(Spain) Emilio Alzamora	Honda	+5.298	9
8	(Japan) Akira Saito	Honda	+11.140	8
9	(Japan) Tomomi Manako	Honda	+11.273	7
10	(Spain) Herri Torrontegui	Honda	+13.311	6
11	(Italy) Gianluigi Scalvini	Aprilia	+23.146	5
12	(Australia) Garry McCoy	Honda	+24.424	4
13	(Spain) Jorge Martinez	Yamaha	+29.863	3
14	(Germany) Oliver Koch	Aprilia	+30.036	2
15	(Japan) Masaki Tokudome	Aprilia	+38.050	1
16	(Japan) Yoshiaki Katoh	Yamaha	+38.878	
17	(Japan) Hideyuki Nakajo	Honda	+39.356	
18	(Japan) Takehiro Yamamoto	Honda	+45.726	
19	(Italy) Vittorio Lopez	Aprilia	+46.242	
20	(Italy) Andrea Ballerini	Aprilia	+46.311	
21	(Japan) Hiroyuki Kikuchi	Honda	+1:00.274	
22	(Spain) Josep Sarda	Honda	+1:05.084	
23	(Japan) Yoshiyuki Sugai	Honda	+1:15.103	
24	(Spain) Andrés Sanchez	Aprilia	+1:15.404	
25	(Japan) Tomoko Igata	Honda	+1:15.446	
26	(Italy) Gabriele Debbia	Yamaha	+1:15.656	
27	(Spain) Javier Dubon	Honda	+1 Lap	
Ret	(Spain) Luis Alvaro	Honda	Retirement	
Ret	(Japan) Ken Miyasaka	Honda	Retirement	
Ret	(Italy) Ivan Cremonini	Honda	Retirement	
Ret	(Netherlands) Loek Bodelier	Aprilia	Retirement	
Ret	(Germany) Manfred Geissler	Aprilia	Retirement	

Previous race: 1995 Japanese Grand Prix	FIM Grand Prix World Championship; 1995 season	Next race: 1995 German Grand Prix
Previous race: 1994 Spanish Grand Prix	Spanish Grand Prix	Next race: 1996 Spanish Grand Prix
