= 1995 Argentine motorcycle Grand Prix =

(Argentina) 1995 Argentine Grand Prix
Race details
- Race 12 of 13 races in the 1995 Grand Prix motorcycle racing season
- Date: 24 September 1995
- Official name: Grand Prix Marlboro
- Location: Autódromo Juan y Oscar Gálvez
- Course: Permanent racing facility; 4.350 km (2.703 mi)

MotoGP
Pole position
- Rider: (Italy) Luca Cadalora
- Time: 1:44.384
Fastest lap
- Rider: (Australia) Daryl Beattie
- Time: 1:44.654
Podium
- First: (Australia) Mick Doohan
- Second: (Australia) Daryl Beattie
- Third: (Italy) Luca Cadalora

250cc
Pole position
- Rider: (France) Jean-Michel Bayle
- Time: 1:46.667
Fastest lap
- Rider: (Italy) Max Biaggi
- Time: 1:46.214
Podium
- First: (Italy) Max Biaggi
- Second: (Japan) Tetsuya Harada
- Third: (Italy) Doriano Romboni

125cc
Pole position
- Rider: (Spain) Emilio Alzamora
- Time: 1:51.157
Fastest lap
- Rider: (Japan) Takehiro Yamamoto
- Time: 1:51.217
Podium
- First: (Spain) Emilio Alzamora
- Second: (Japan) Masaki Tokudome
- Third: (Germany) Dirk Raudies

The 1995 Argentine motorcycle Grand Prix was the penultimate round of the 1995 Grand Prix motorcycle racing season. It took place on 24 September 1995 at the Autódromo Oscar Alfredo Gálvez in Buenos Aires.

== 500 cc classification ==
Pos.	Rider	Team	Manufacturer	Time/Retired	Points
1	(Australia) Mick Doohan	Repsol YPF Honda Team	Honda	47:30.236	25
2	(Australia) Daryl Beattie	Lucky Strike Suzuki	Suzuki	+2.293	20
3	(Italy) Luca Cadalora	Marlboro Team Roberts	Yamaha	+9.034	16
4	(Spain) Àlex Crivillé	Repsol YPF Honda Team	Honda	+10.675	13
5	(Italy) Loris Capirossi	Marlboro Team Pileri	Honda	+21.588	11
6	(Japan) Norifumi Abe	Marlboro Team Roberts	Yamaha	+22.006	10
7	(Spain) Carlos Checa	Fortuna Honda Pons	Honda	+30.488	9
8	(Brazil) Alex Barros	Kanemoto Honda	Honda	+38.080	8
9	(Japan) Shinichi Itoh	Repsol YPF Honda Team	Honda	+38.196	7
10	(United Kingdom) Neil Hodgson	World Championship Motorsports	Yamaha	+50.555	6
11	(Spain) Juan Borja	Team ROC NRJ	ROC Yamaha	+51.177	5
12	(France) Bernard Garcia	Team ROC NRJ	ROC Yamaha	+1:15.890	4
13	(United Kingdom) James Haydon	Harris Grand Prix	Harris Yamaha	+1:18.132	3
14	(United Kingdom) Sean Emmett	Harris Grand Prix	Harris Yamaha	+1:18.340	2
15	(Switzerland) Adrien Bosshard	Thommen Elf Racing	ROC Yamaha	+1:21.413	1
16	(Belgium) Laurent Naveau	Team ROC	ROC Yamaha	+1:26.404	
17	(France) Marc Garcia	DR Team Shark	ROC Yamaha	+1:31.564	
18	(United Kingdom) Eugene McManus	Padgett's Racing Team	Harris Yamaha	+1 Lap	
19	(Italy) Lucio Pedercini	Team Pedercini	ROC Yamaha	+1 Lap	
20	(Italy) Cristiano Migliorati	Harris Grand Prix	Harris Yamaha	+1 Lap	
21	(United Kingdom) Lee Pullan	Padgett's Racing Team	Harris Yamaha	+1 Lap	
Ret	(United States) Scott Gray	Starsport	Harris Yamaha	Retirement	
Ret	(France) José Kuhn	MTD	ROC Yamaha	Retirement	
Ret	(Switzerland) Bernard Haenggeli	Haenggeli Racing	ROC Yamaha	Retirement	
Ret	(France) Frederic Protat	FP Racing	ROC Yamaha	Retirement	
Ret	(United Kingdom) Jeremy McWilliams	Millar Racing	Yamaha	Retirement	
Ret	(United States) Scott Russell	Lucky Strike Suzuki	Suzuki	Retirement	
Ret	(France) Jean Pierre Jeandat	JPJ Paton	Paton	Retirement	
Ret	(Italy) Loris Reggiani	Aprilia Racing Team	Aprilia	Retirement	
Ret	(Italy) Marco Papa	Team Marco Papa	ROC Yamaha	Retirement	

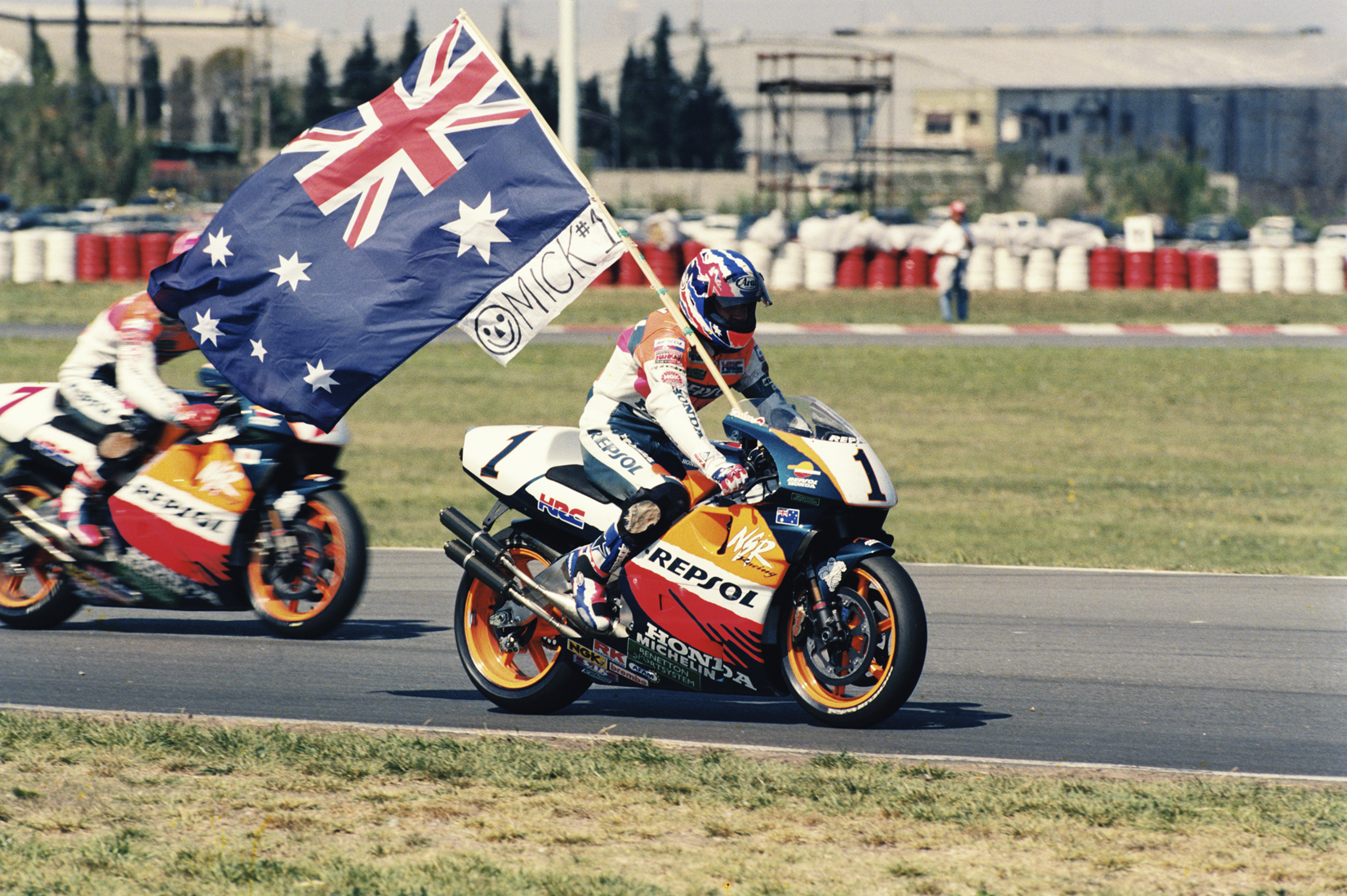
Mick Doohan, celebrating his second 500cc title after winning the race. Behind him is Shinichi Ito, who finished ninth.

== 250 cc classification ==
Pos	Rider	Manufacturer	Time/Retired	Points
1	(Italy) Max Biaggi	Aprilia	44:48.738	25
2	(Japan) Tetsuya Harada	Yamaha	+0.204	20
3	(Italy) Doriano Romboni	Honda	+7.083	16
4	(France) Olivier Jacque	Honda	+7.680	13
5	(France) Jean Philippe Ruggia	Honda	+7.866	11
6	(Germany) Ralf Waldmann	Honda	+10.154	10
7	(Japan) Tadayuki Okada	Honda	+29.242	9
8	(Germany) Jürgen Fuchs	Honda	+31.209	8
9	(Netherlands) Jurgen vd Goorbergh	Honda	+34.993	7
10	(Italy) Roberto Locatelli	Aprilia	+38.503	6
11	(United Kingdom) Niall Mackenzie	Aprilia	+43.936	5
12	(Spain) Luis d'Antin	Honda	+56.044	4
13	(Argentina) Sebastian Porto	Aprilia	+56.428	3
14	(France) Regis Laconi	Honda	+1:04.488	2
15	(Japan) Takeshi Tsujimura	Honda	+1:17.972	1
16	(Italy) Davide Bulega	Honda	+1:26.384	
17	(Venezuela) José Barresi	Honda	+1:27.192	
18	(Spain) Luis Maurel	Honda	+1:28.434	
19	(Spain) Gregorio Lavilla	Honda	+1:44.665	
20	(Spain) Pere Riba	Aprilia	+1:47.132	
Ret	(Spain) Ruben Xaus	Honda	Retirement	
Ret	(Spain) Miguel Angel Castilla	Honda	Retirement	
Ret	(Spain) José Luis Cardoso	Aprilia	Retirement	
Ret	(Germany) Bernd Kassner	Aprilia	Retirement	
Ret	(Japan) Nobuatsu Aoki	Honda	Retirement	
Ret	(United States) Kenny Roberts Jr	Yamaha	Retirement	
Ret	(Netherlands) Patrick vd Goorbergh	Aprilia	Retirement	
Ret	(Germany) Adolf Stadler	Aprilia	Retirement	
Ret	(France) Jean-Michel Bayle	Aprilia	Retirement	
Ret	(Argentina) Federico Gartner	Honda	Retirement	
Ret	(Italy) Massimiliano d'Agnano	Aprilia	Retirement	
Ret	(Argentina) Roberto van Keulen	Yamaha	Retirement	
Ret	(Argentina) Marcos Cativa Tolos	Yamaha	Retirement	

== 125 cc classification ==
Pos	Rider	Manufacturer	Time/Retired	Points
1	(Spain) Emilio Alzamora	Honda	43:03.230	25
2	(Japan) Masaki Tokudome	Aprilia	+12.520	20
3	(Germany) Dirk Raudies	Honda	+12.714	16
4	(Japan) Akira Saito	Honda	+12.967	13
5	(Germany) Oliver Koch	Aprilia	+13.516	11
6	(Spain) Herri Torrontegui	Honda	+13.612	10
7	(Germany) Peter Öttl	Aprilia	+16.526	9
8	(Spain) Jorge Martinez	Yamaha	+18.280	8
9	(Japan) Tomomi Manako	Honda	+18.594	7
10	(Japan) Hideyuki Nakajo	Honda	+19.241	6
11	(Japan) Takehiro Yamamoto	Honda	+19.514	5
12	(Japan) Yoshiaki Katoh	Yamaha	+20.298	4
13	(Japan) Noboru Ueda	Honda	+31.804	3
14	(Japan) Haruchika Aoki	Honda	+36.006	2
15	(Japan) Yoshiyuki Sugai	Honda	+39.017	1
16	(Germany) Manfred Geissler	Aprilia	+42.130	
17	(Germany) Stefan Prein	Honda	+50.016	
18	(Italy) Gabriele Debbia	Yamaha	+1 Lap	
19	(Germany) Markus Ober	Honda	+1 Lap	
20	(Argentina) Damian Pereyra	Yamaha	+1 Lap	
21	(Argentina) Pablo Zeballos	Yamaha	+1 Lap	
22	(Argentina) Gaston Ruaben	Yamaha	+1 Lap	
23	(Japan) Hiroyuki Kikuchi	Honda	+1 Lap	
Ret	(Argentina) Nestor Amoroso	Aprilia	Retirement	
Ret	(Italy) Gianluigi Scalvini	Aprilia	Retirement	
Ret	(Italy) Stefano Perugini	Aprilia	Retirement	
Ret	(Italy) Massimo d'Agnano	Aprilia	Retirement	
Ret	(Spain) Josep Sarda	Honda	Retirement	
Ret	(Japan) Kazuto Sakata	Aprilia	Retirement	
Ret	(Italy) Luigi Ancona	Honda	Retirement	
Ret	(Japan) Ken Miyasaka	Horex	Retirement	
Ret	(Japan) Tomoko Igata	Honda	Retirement	
Ret	(Italy) Andrea Ballerini	Aprilia	Retirement	

Previous race: 1995 Rio de Janeiro Grand Prix	FIM Grand Prix World Championship; 1995 season	Next race: 1995 European Grand Prix
Previous race: 1994 Argentine Grand Prix	Argentine Grand Prix	Next race: 1998 Argentine Grand Prix
