= 1995 Japanese motorcycle Grand Prix =

(Japan) 1995 Japanese Grand Prix
Race details
- Race 3 of 13 races in the 1995 Grand Prix motorcycle racing season
- Date: 23 April 1995
- Official name: Marlboro Grand Prix of Japan
- Location: Suzuka Circuit
- Course: Permanent racing facility; 5.864 km (3.644 mi)

MotoGP
Pole position
- Rider: (Australia) Mick Doohan
- Time: 2:08.572
Fastest lap
- Rider: (Australia) Mick Doohan
- Time: 2:24.021
Podium
- First: (Australia) Daryl Beattie
- Second: (Australia) Mick Doohan
- Third: (Japan) Takuma Aoki

250cc
Pole position
- Rider: (Japan) Tetsuya Harada
- Time: 2:10.075
Fastest lap
- Rider: (Japan) Tadayuki Okada
- Time: 2:30.456
Podium
- First: (Germany) Ralf Waldmann
- Second: (Japan) Nobuatsu Aoki
- Third: (Japan) Sadanori Hikita

125cc
Pole position
- Rider: (Japan) Kazuto Sakata
- Time: 2:17.442
Fastest lap
- Rider: (Japan) Hideyuki Nakajo
- Time: 2:30.343
Podium
- First: (Japan) Haruchika Aoki
- Second: (Japan) Akira Saito
- Third: (Japan) Kazuto Sakata

The 1995 Japanese motorcycle Grand Prix was the third round of the 1995 Grand Prix motorcycle racing season. It took place on 23 April 1995 at the Suzuka Circuit.

== 500 cc classification ==
Pos.	Rider	Team	Manufacturer	Time/Retired	Points
1	(Australia) Daryl Beattie	Lucky Strike Suzuki	Suzuki	44:02.298	25
2	(Australia) Mick Doohan	Repsol YPF Honda Team	Honda	+9.582	20
3	(Japan) Takuma Aoki	Team HRC	Honda	+9.708	16
4	(Italy) Luca Cadalora	Marlboro Team Roberts	Yamaha	+19.624	13
5	(Spain) Alberto Puig	Fortuna Honda Pons	Honda	+21.682	11
6	(United States) Kevin Schwantz	Lucky Strike Suzuki	Suzuki	+24.552	10
7	(Spain) Juan Borja	Team ROC NRJ	ROC Yamaha	+1:12.746	9
8	(Japan) Toshiyuki Arakaki	Padgett's-Tube Riders	Harris Yamaha	+1:22.461	8
9	(Japan) Norifumi Abe	Marlboro Team Roberts	Yamaha	+1:25.306	7
10	(Italy) Loris Reggiani	Aprilia Racing Team	Aprilia	+1:28.900	6
11	(France) Bernard Garcia	Team ROC NRJ	ROC Yamaha	+1:39.298	5
12	(New Zealand) Andrew Stroud	Team Max	ROC Yamaha	+1:49.628	4
13	(United Kingdom) Sean Emmett	Harris Grand Prix	Harris Yamaha	+1:53.434	3
14	(United Kingdom) Neil Hodgson	World Championship Motorsports	ROC Yamaha	+1:58.610	2
15	(Switzerland) Adrien Bosshard	Thommen Elf Racing	ROC Yamaha	+2:04.426	1
16	(France) Marc Garcia	DR Team Shark	ROC Yamaha	+2:05.655	
17	(Belgium) Laurent Naveau	Team ROC	ROC Yamaha	+2:12.310	
18	(Italy) Cristiano Migliorati	Harris Grand Prix	Harris Yamaha	+1 Lap	
19	(France) Bruno Bonhuil	MTD	ROC Yamaha	+1 Lap	
20	(France) Jean Pierre Jeandat	JPJ Paton	Paton	+1 Lap	
21	(United Kingdom) Eugene McManus	Padgett's Racing Team	Harris Yamaha	+1 Lap	
22	(Italy) Lucio Pedercini	Team Pedercini	ROC Yamaha	+1 Lap	
23	(France) Frederic Protat	FP Racing	ROC Yamaha	+1 Lap	
Ret	(Switzerland) Bernard Haenggeli	Haenggeli Racing	ROC Yamaha	Retirement	
Ret	(Japan) Shinichi Itoh	Repsol YPF Honda Team	Honda	Retirement	
Ret	(United Kingdom) James Haydon	Harris Grand Prix	Yamaha	Retirement	
Ret	(United Kingdom) Jeremy McWilliams	Millar Racing	Yamaha	Retirement	
Ret	(Spain) Àlex Crivillé	Repsol YPF Honda Team	Honda	Retirement	
Ret	(United States) Scott Gray	Starsport	Yamaha	Retirement	
Ret	(Japan) Toshihiko Honma	YRTR	Yamaha	Retirement	
Ret	(Italy) Loris Capirossi	Marlboro Team Pileri	Honda	Retirement	
Ret	(Brazil) Alex Barros	Kanemoto Honda	Honda	Retirement	

== 250 cc classification ==
Pos	Rider	Manufacturer	Time/Retired	Points
1	(Germany) Ralf Waldmann	Honda	30:46.248	25
2	(Japan) Nobuatsu Aoki	Honda	+31.590	20
3	(Japan) Sadanori Hikita	Honda	+53.232	16
4	(Japan) Tetsuya Harada	Yamaha	+54.746	13
5	(France) Jean Philippe Ruggia	Honda	+59.196	11
6	(Japan) Osamu Miyazaki	Aprilia	+1:01.465	10
7	(Spain) José Luis Cardoso	Aprilia	+1:02.558	9
8	(Switzerland) Eskil Suter	Aprilia	+1:10.152	8
9	(Italy) Max Biaggi	Aprilia	+1:10.381	7
10	(Netherlands) Jurgen vd Goorbergh	Honda	+1:30.872	6
11	(Spain) Luis Maurel	Honda	+1:37.854	5
12	(Germany) Jürgen Fuchs	Honda	+1:39.460	4
13	(Germany) Bernd Kassner	Aprilia	+1:39.746	3
14	(Japan) Masaaki Morikane	Honda	+1:56.088	2
15	(France) Regis Laconi	Honda	+2:07.204	1
16	(Spain) Miguel Angel Castilla	Yamaha	+2:22.032	
17	(Spain) Pere Riba	Aprilia	+2:22.342	
18	(Italy) Roberto Locatelli	Aprilia	+2:23.166	
19	(Switzerland) Olivier Petrucciani	Aprilia	+2:33.288	
Ret	(Japan) Tadayuki Okada	Honda	Retirement	
Ret	(Germany) Adolf Stadler	Aprilia	Retirement	
Ret	(Japan) Takeshi Tsujimura	Honda	Retirement	
Ret	(Italy) Davide Bulega	Honda	Retirement	
Ret	(United States) Kenny Roberts Jr	Yamaha	Retirement	
Ret	(Japan) Tohru Ukawa	Honda	Retirement	
Ret	(Netherlands) Patrick vd Goorbergh	Aprilia	Retirement	
Ret	(Spain) Gregorio Lavilla	Honda	Retirement	
Ret	(France) Jean-Michel Bayle	Aprilia	Retirement	
Ret	(Japan) Noriyasu Numata	Suzuki	Retirement	
Ret	(France) Olivier Jacque	Honda	Retirement	
Ret	(Italy) Doriano Romboni	Honda	Retirement	
Ret	(Spain) Luis d'Antin	Honda	Retirement	
Ret	(Spain) Carlos Checa	Honda	Retirement	

== 125 cc classification ==
Pos	Rider	Manufacturer	Time/Retired	Points
1	(Japan) Haruchika Aoki	Honda	46:28.996	25
2	(Japan) Akira Saito	Honda	+1.796	20
3	(Japan) Kazuto Sakata	Aprilia	+1.903	16
4	(Japan) Hideyuki Nakajo	Honda	+2.140	13
5	(Japan) Shigeru Ibaraki	Yamaha	+7.273	11
6	(Japan) Yoshiaki Katoh	Yamaha	+7.694	10
7	(Spain) Emilio Alzamora	Honda	+16.609	9
8	(Japan) Ken Miyasaka	Honda	+18.309	8
9	(Spain) Herri Torrontegui	Honda	+27.918	7
10	(Japan) Tomomi Manako	Honda	+44.516	6
11	(Germany) Peter Öttl	Aprilia	+47.584	5
12	(Japan) Yoshiyuki Sugai	Honda	+1:12.878	4
13	(Germany) Manfred Geissler	Aprilia	+1:13.604	3
14	(Japan) Noboru Ueda	Honda	+1:13.902	2
15	(Japan) Youichi Ui	Yamaha	+1:40.284	1
16	(Japan) Takehiro Yamamoto	Honda	+1:40.613	
17	(Japan) Masayuki Azami	Honda	+1:40.808	
18	(Japan) Tomoko Igata	Honda	+1:48.202	
19	(Netherlands) Loek Bodelier	Aprilia	+1:55.370	
20	(Italy) Vittorio Lopez	Aprilia	+1:56.248	
21	(Italy) Gabriele Debbia	Yamaha	+1:59.691	
22	(Germany) Stefan Kurfiss	Yamaha	+2:11.296	
23	(Italy) Ivan Cremonini	Honda	+1 Lap	
Ret	(Germany) Dirk Raudies	Honda	Retirement	
Ret	(Japan) Hiroyuki Kikuchi	Honda	Retirement	
Ret	(Japan) Masaki Tokudome	Aprilia	Retirement	
Ret	(Germany) Stefan Prein	Yamaha	Retirement	
Ret	(Australia) Garry McCoy	Honda	Retirement	
Ret	(Italy) Andrea Ballerini	Aprilia	Retirement	
Ret	(Japan) Yuzo Fujioka	Honda	Retirement	
Ret	(Italy) Gianluigi Scalvini	Aprilia	Retirement	
Ret	(Italy) Stefano Perugini	Aprilia	Retirement	
Ret	(Germany) Oliver Koch	Aprilia	Retirement	
Ret	(Spain) Jorge Martinez	Yamaha	Retirement	

Previous race: 1995 Malaysian Grand Prix	FIM Grand Prix World Championship; 1995 season	Next race: 1995 Spanish Grand Prix
Previous race: 1994 Japanese Grand Prix	Japanese Grand Prix	Next race: 1996 Japanese Grand Prix
