= 1995 Grand Prix motorcycle racing season =

Sports season

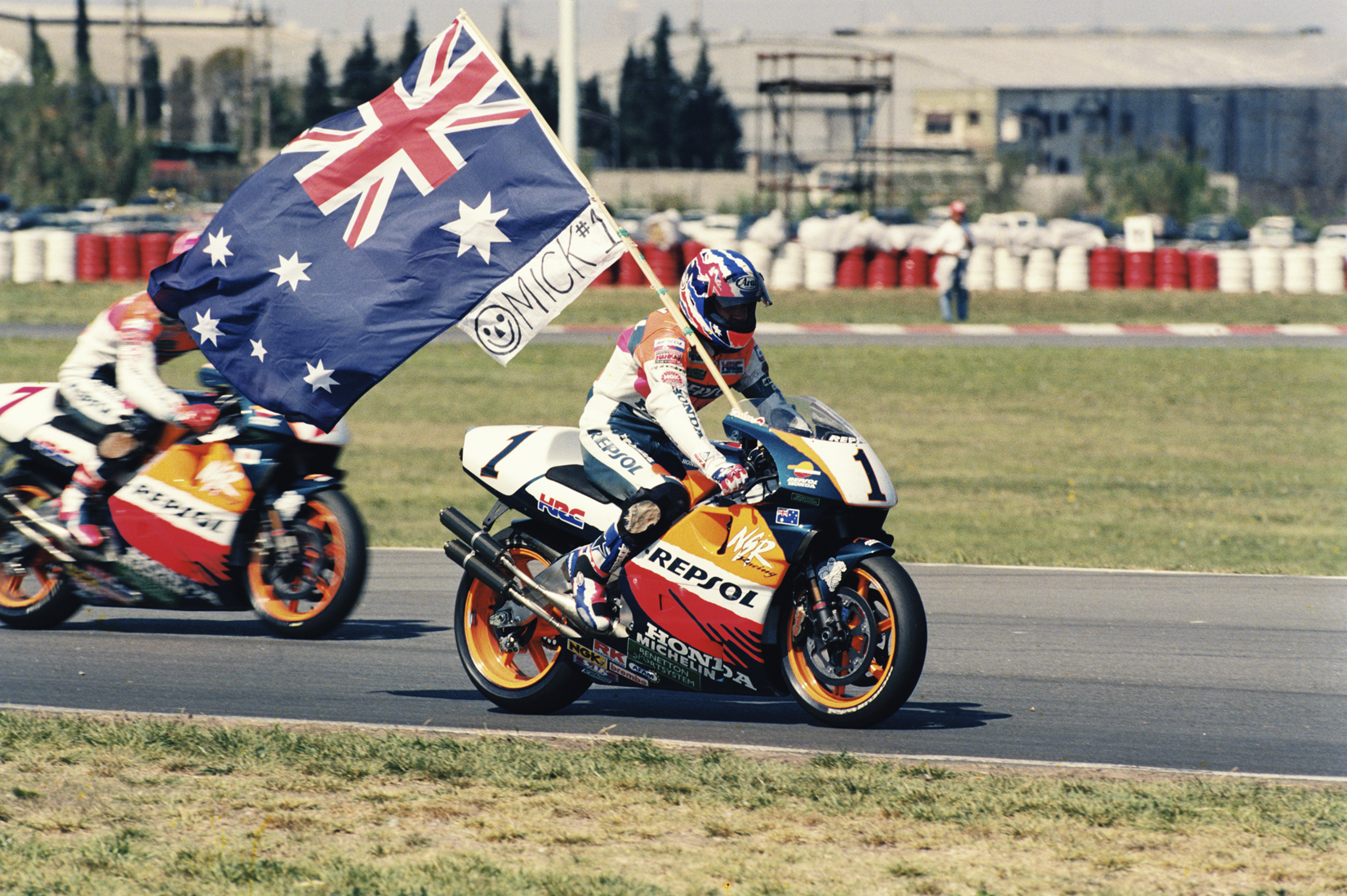
Mick Doohan (pictured at Buenos Aires) became the 1995 500cc world champion

The 1995 Grand Prix motorcycle racing season was the 47th F.I.M. Road Racing World Championship season.

== Season summary ==
Honda's Mick Doohan captured his second consecutive 500cc crown in 1995. Suzuki's Daryl Beattie had an early season points lead but crashed and injured himself in practice at Assen. Luca Cadalora again won two races for Yamaha but failed to show any consistency. Kevin Schwantz retired after the third race of the season with his numerous injuries finally taking their toll.

Max Biaggi also won his second consecutive 250 championship for Aprilia with his eight victories second only to Mike Hailwood's 10 victories in 1966. Haruchika Aoki dominated the 125cc championship, winning the title for Honda with seven wins.

== 1995 Grand Prix season calendar ==
The following Grands Prix were scheduled to take place in 1995:

Round	Date	Grand Prix	Circuit
1	26 March	(Australia) Australian Motorcycle Grand Prix	Eastern Creek Raceway
2	2 April	(Malaysia) Marlboro Malaysian Grand Prix	Shah Alam Circuit
3	23 April	Marlboro Grand Prix of Japan	Suzuka Circuit
4	7 May	(Spain) Gran Premio de España MX Onda	Circuito Permanente de Jerez
5	21 May	(Germany) Grand Prix Deutschland	Nürburgring
6	11 June	(Italy) Gran Premio d'Italia	Mugello Circuit
7	24 June ††	(Netherlands) Lucky Strike Dutch Grand Prix	TT Circuit Assen
8	9 July	Grand Prix de France	Bugatti Circuit
9	23 July	(United Kingdom) British Grand Prix	Donington Park
10	20 August	(Czech Republic) Grand Prix České republiky	Brno Circuit
11	17 September	(Rio de Janeiro (state)) Lucky Strike Rio Grand Prix	Autódromo Internacional Nelson Piquet
12	24 September	Grand Prix Marlboro Argentina	Autódromo Oscar Alfredo Gálvez
13	8 October	(Europe) Gran Premio Marlboro de Catalunya	Circuit de Catalunya

†† = Saturday race

=== Calendar changes ===
- The German Grand Prix moved from the Hockenheimring to the Nürburgring.
- The Austrian Grand Prix was taken off the calendar because the Salzburgring (the venue which was used) was deemed too dangerous for racing.
- The Rio Grand Prix was added to the calendar as a replacement for the Austrian Grand Prix.
- The United States Grand Prix was scheduled to be held on 6 August, but was removed from the calendar due to financial difficulties.

== Participants ==
=== 500cc participants ===
Team	Constructor	Motorcycle	No.	Rider	Rounds
(Japan) Repsol YPF Honda Team	Honda	Honda NSR500	1	(Australia) Mick Doohan	All
(Japan) Repsol YPF Honda Team	Honda	Honda NSR500	6	(Spain) Àlex Crivillé	All
(Japan) Repsol YPF Honda Team	Honda	Honda NSR500	7	(Japan) Shinichi Ito	All
(Japan) Team HRC	Honda	Honda NSR500	55	(Japan) Takuma Aoki	3
(United States) Marlboro Team Roberts	Yamaha	Yamaha YZR500	2	(Italy) Luca Cadalora	All
(United States) Marlboro Team Roberts	Yamaha	Yamaha YZR500	17	(Japan) Norifumi Abe	All
(Japan) Team Lucky Strike Suzuki	Suzuki	Suzuki RGV500	4	(Australia) Daryl Beattie	All
(Japan) Team Lucky Strike Suzuki	Suzuki	Suzuki RGV500	8	(United Kingdom) Sean Emmett	4-5
(Japan) Team Lucky Strike Suzuki	Suzuki	Suzuki RGV500	34	(United States) Kevin Schwantz	1–3
(Japan) Team Lucky Strike Suzuki	Suzuki	Suzuki RGV500	45	(United States) Scott Russell	6–8, 10–13
(Spain) Fortuna Honda Pons	Honda	Honda NSR500	5	(Spain) Alberto Puig	1–7
(Spain) Fortuna Honda Pons	Honda	Honda NSR500	12	(Spain) Carlos Checa	9–13
(United Kingdom) Harris Grand Prix	Harris-Yamaha	Harris SLS500	8	(United Kingdom) Sean Emmett	6–13
(United Kingdom) Harris Grand Prix	Harris-Yamaha	Harris SLS500	20	(Italy) Cristiano Migliorati	All
(United Kingdom) Harris Grand Prix	Harris-Yamaha	Harris SLS500	35	(United Kingdom) Brian Morrison	4
(United Kingdom) Harris Grand Prix	Harris-Yamaha	Harris SLS500	38	(Venezuela) Antonio Irizar	5
(United Kingdom) Harris Grand Prix	Harris-Yamaha	Harris SLS500	69	(United Kingdom) James Haydon	All
(Japan) Kanemoto Honda	Honda	Honda NSR500	9	(Brazil) Alex Barros	All
(United Kingdom) Team Millar	Yamaha	Yamaha YZR500	10	(United Kingdom) Jeremy McWilliams	All
(France) D.R. Team Erima	ROC-Yamaha	Yamaha YZR500	11	(France) Bernard Garcia	All
(Italy) Aprilia Racing Team	Aprilia	Aprilia RSW-2 500	13	(Italy) Loris Reggiani	All
(France) Thommen Elf Racing Team	ROC-Yamaha	ROC Yamaha GP1	14	(Switzerland) Adrian Bosshard	All
(Belgium) ROC Euro Team	ROC-Yamaha	ROC Yamaha GP1	18	(Belgium) Laurent Naveau	1–6, 8, 10–13
(Spain) Team ROC N.R.J.	ROC-Yamaha	ROC Yamaha GP1	19	(Spain) Juan Borja	All
(France) Team ROC	ROC-Yamaha	ROC Yamaha GP1	40	(France) José Kuhn	10–13
(France) Team ROC	ROC-Yamaha	ROC Yamaha GP1	79	(France) Philippe Monneret	8
(United Kingdom) Team ROC Yamaha	ROC-Yamaha	ROC Yamaha GP1	96	(United Kingdom) James Whitham	9
(Switzerland) Hänggeli Racing	ROC-Yamaha	ROC Yamaha GP1	21	(Switzerland) Bernard Hänggeli	All
(Italy) Team Pedercini	ROC-Yamaha	ROC Yamaha GP1	22	(Italy) Lucio Pedercini	All
(United Kingdom) Padgett's Racing Team	Harris-Yamaha	Harris SLS500	23	(United Kingdom) Eugene McManus	All
(United Kingdom) Padgett's Racing Team	Harris-Yamaha	Harris SLS500	26	(United States) Jim Filice	4, 6–7
(United Kingdom) Padgett's Racing Team	Harris-Yamaha	Harris SLS500	36	(United Kingdom) Jamie Robinson	1–2
(United Kingdom) Padgett's Racing Team	Harris-Yamaha	Harris SLS500	39	(United Kingdom) Lee Pullan	11–13
(United Kingdom) Padgett's Racing Team	Harris-Yamaha	Harris SLS500	85	(United Kingdom) Chris Walker	9–10
(United States) Starsport	ROC-Yamaha	ROC Yamaha GP1	24	(United States) Scott Gray	1–9, 12–13
(United Kingdom) World Championship Motorsports	ROC-Yamaha	ROC Yamaha GP1	25	(United Kingdom) Neil Hodgson	All
(New Zealand) Team Max	ROC-Yamaha	ROC Yamaha GP1	27	(New Zealand) Andrew Stroud	1–7
(New Zealand) Team Max	ROC-Yamaha	ROC Yamaha GP1	70	(Italy) Marco Papa	8–13
(France) MTD	ROC-Yamaha	ROC Yamaha GP1	28	(France) Bruno Bonhuil	1–10
(United Kingdom) / (Japan) Padgetts-Tube Riders	Harris-Yamaha	Harris SLS500	32	(Japan) Toshiyuki Arakaki	3, 5, 8–9
(France) FP Racing	ROC-Yamaha	ROC Yamaha GP1	37	(France) Frédéric Protat	All
(Italy) JPJ Paton	Paton	Paton V70 500	40	(France) José Kuhn	10–13
(Italy) JPJ Paton	Paton	Paton V70 500	51	(France) Jean-Pierre Jeandat	1–9, 11–13
(Spain) J.L.M.	ROC-Yamaha	ROC Yamaha GP1	41	(Spain) Enrique de Juan	13
(France) DR Team Shark	ROC-Yamaha	ROC Yamaha GP1	44	(France) Marc Garcia	All
(United States) Team Rainey	Harris-Yamaha	Harris SLS500	52	(Australia) Martin Craggill	1
(Japan) YRTR	Yamaha	Yamaha YZR500	56	(Japan) Toshihiko Honma	3
(Italy) Marlboro Team Pileri	Honda	Honda NSR500	65	(Italy) Loris Capirossi	All
(Switzerland) Team Schmassman	Yamaha	Yamaha YZR500	66	(Switzerland) Niggi Schmassmann	5
(Germany) Hoff Meister - Wieser	Yamaha	Yamaha YZR500	67	(Germany) Hans Wieser	5
(Italy) Team Marco Papa	ROC-Yamaha Librenti-Suzuki	ROC Yamaha GP1; Librenti 500	70	(Italy) Marco Papa	All
(Italy) Cagiva Corse	Cagiva	Cagiva C594	71	(Italy) Pierfrancesco Chili	6
(Netherlands) PHI Racing Team	Harris-Yamaha	Harris SLS500	74	(Netherlands) Cees Doorakkers	7

Key
Regular Rider
Wildcard Rider
Replacement Rider

=== 250cc participants ===
Team	Constructor	Motorcycle	No.	Rider	Rounds
Chesterfield Aprilia	Aprilia	Aprilia RSV 250	1	(Italy) Max Biaggi	All
Chesterfield Aprilia	Aprilia	Aprilia RSV 250	8	(France) Jean-Michel Bayle	All
Team HRC	Honda	Honda NSR250	2	(Japan) Tadayuki Okada	All
Team HRC	Honda	Honda NSR250	56	(Japan) Tohru Ukawa	3
FCC Technical Sports	Honda	Honda NSR250	3	(Japan) Takeshi Tsujimura	1–4, 7–9, 11–13
Honda Team Agostini	Honda	Honda NSR250	4	(Italy) Doriano Romboni	1–4, 8–12
Honda Team Agostini	Honda	Honda NSR250	11	(Netherlands) Wilco Zeelenberg	7
Honda Team Agostini	Honda	Honda NSR250	39	(Italy) Alessandro Gramigni	4, 6–8
Docshop Racing	Aprilia	Aprilia RSV 250	5	(United Kingdom) Niall Mackenzie	All
Docshop Racing	Aprilia	Aprilia RSV 250	16	(Netherlands) Patrick van den Goorbergh	All
Docshop Racing	Aprilia	Aprilia RSV 250	41	(United Kingdom) Jamie Robinson	1–2
Elf-Honda-Tech 3	Honda	Honda NSR250	6	(France) Jean-Philippe Ruggia	All
Elf-Honda-Tech 3	Honda	Honda NSR250	19	(France) Olivier Jacque	All
Marlboro Team Rainey	Yamaha	Yamaha YZR 250	7	(Japan) Tetsuya Harada	All
Marlboro Team Rainey	Yamaha	Yamaha YZR 250	25	(United States) Kenny Roberts Jr.	All
MX Onda-S.S.P. Comp.	Honda	Honda NSR250	9	(Spain) Luis d'Antin	??
MX Onda-S.S.P. Comp.	Honda	Honda NSR250	21	(Italy) Gregorio Lavilla	All
Blumex Rheos Racing	Honda	Honda NSR250	10	(Japan) Nobuatsu Aoki	All
Fortuna Honda Pons	Honda	Honda NSR250	12	(Spain) Carlos Checa	1–8
Fortuna Honda Pons	Honda	Honda NSR250	14	(Spain) Rubén Xaus	9–13
Fortuna Honda Pons	Honda	Honda NSR250	94	(Spain) Sete Gibernau	13
Mohag Aprilia	Aprilia	Aprilia RSV 250	13	(Switzerland) Eskil Suter	1–11, 13
Edo Racing	Aprilia	Aprilia RSV 250	15	(Switzerland) Oliver Petrucciani	1–10, 13
Edo Racing	Aprilia	Aprilia RSV 250	51	(Italy) Massimiliano d’Agnano	??
Maxell Team Global	Honda	Honda NSR250	17	(Netherlands) Jurgen van den Goorbergh	All
Maxell Team Global	Honda	Honda NSR250	27	(Japan) Sadanoti Hikita	1–9
Maxell Team Global	Honda	Honda NSR250	37	(Venezuela) José Barresi	10–13
Aprilia Racing Team	Aprilia	Aprilia RSV 250	18	(Italy) Roberto Locatelli	1, 3–4, 6–7, 9–13
Aprilia Racing Team	Aprilia	Aprilia RSV 250	34	(Italy) Marcellino Lucchi	5–6
Veitinger	Aprilia	Aprilia RSV 250	22	(Germany) Adi Stadler	All
Maurel Competicion	Honda	Honda NSR250	23	(Spain) Luis Carlos Maurel	All
Team Munich	Aprilia	Aprilia RSV 250	24	(Germany) Bernd Kassner	All
Givi Racing	Honda	Honda NSR250	26	(Italy) Davide Bulega	1–3, 10–13
Givi Racing	Honda	Honda NSR250	39	(Italy) Alessandro Gramigni	13
HB Honda Germany	Honda	Honda NSR250	28	(Germany) Ralf Waldmann	All
HB Honda Germany	Honda	Honda NSR250	29	(Germany) Jürgen Fuchs	All
PR2 Aprilia	Aprilia	Aprilia RSV 250	30	(Spain) José Luis Cardoso	All
10x10 Yamaha Repsol	Yamaha	Yamaha YZR 250	31	(Spain) Miguel Castilla	All
Troll 10x10 Repsol	Honda	Honda NSR250	31	(Spain) Miguel Castilla	All
BJC Racing Team	Aprilia	Aprilia RSV 250	32	(Spain) Pere Riba	1–4, 6–12
BJC Racing Team	Aprilia	Aprilia RSV 250	33	(Spain) Francisco Padro	5, 13
Equipe de France GP	Honda	Honda NSR250	55	(France) Régis Laconi	1–4, 6–12
Team Daytona Zero	Aprilia	Aprilia RSV 250	58	(Japan) Osamu Miyazaki	3
Team Yuki/YPF/Esco	Aprilia	Aprilia RSV 250	93	(Argentina) Sebastián Porto	12
Hong Leong Yamaha	Yamaha	Yamaha YZR 250	54	(Malaysia) Shahrun Nizam Tamin	2

Key
Regular Rider
Wildcard Rider
Replacement Rider

=== 125cc participants ===
Team	Constructor	Motorcycle	No.	Rider	Rounds
Team Krona Aprilia	Aprilia	Aprilia RS125R	1	(Japan) Kazuto Sakata	All
Team Krona Aprilia	Aprilia	Aprilia RS125R	22	(Italy) Andrea Ballerini	1–7, 9–13
Team Krona Aprilia	Aprilia	Aprilia RS125R	72	(Italy) Stefano Cruciani	6, 8
Givi Racing	Honda	Honda RS125R	2	(Japan) Noboru Ueda	All
HB Team Raudies	Honda	Honda RS125R	4	(Germany) Dirk Raudies	All
Marlboro Aprilia Eckl	Aprilia	Aprilia RS125R	5	(Germany) Peter Öttl	1–4, 6–13
Marlboro Aprilia Eckl	Aprilia	Aprilia RS125R	23	(Germany) Manfred Geissler	All
Team Aspar Cepsa	Yamaha	Yamaha TZ125	6	(Spain) Jorge Martínez	All
Team Aspar Cepsa	Yamaha	Yamaha TZ125	19	(Japan) Yoshiaki Katoh	1–9, 11–13
Team Aspar Cepsa	Yamaha	Yamaha TZ125	51	(Spain) Ángel Nieto Jr.	10
Team IPA Aprilia	Aprilia	Aprilia RS125R	7	(Italy) Stefano Perugini	All
Team IPA Aprilia	Aprilia	Aprilia RS125R	17	(Italy) Gianluigi Scalvini	10
GP Team Ditter Plastic	Aprilia	Aprilia RS125R	8	(Japan) Masaki Tokudome	All
GP Team Ditter Plastic	Aprilia	Aprilia RS125R	18	(Italy) Oliver Koch	1–4, 6–13
Team Ditter Plastic	Honda	Honda RS125R	64	(Germany) Frank Baldinger	5
Jha Racing	Honda	Honda RS125R	9	(Japan) Hideyuki Nakajyo	All
Jha Racing	Honda	Honda RS125R	37	(Japan) Ken Miyasaka	All
Pit Lane Racing	Honda	Honda RS125R	10	(Spain) Herri Torrontegui	All
Energizer Elf/Prein	Yamaha	Yamaha TZ125	11	(Germany) Stefan Prein	1–8
Energizer Elf/Prein	Honda	Honda RS125R	11	(Germany) Stefan Prein	10–13
Energizer Elf/Prein	Yamaha	Yamaha TZ125	41	(Germany) Christian Kellner	9
Blumex Rheos Racing	Honda	Honda RS125R	12	(Japan) Haruchika Aoki	All
Team Europa Zwafink	Honda	Honda RS125R	13	(Australia) Garry McCoy	1–4
Team Europa Zwafink	Honda	Honda RS125R	63	(Spain) Josep Sarda	4, 6–12
Docshop Racing	Honda	Honda RS125R	14	(Japan) Akira Saito	All
L.B. Racing Team	Aprilia	Aprilia RS125R	15	(Netherlands) Loek Bodelier	1–6
L.B. Racing Team	Aprilia	Aprilia RS125R	25	(Italy) Vittorio Lopez	8–9
L.B. Racing Team	Aprilia	Aprilia RS125R	41	(Germany) Markus Ober	12
L.B. Racing Team	Aprilia	Aprilia RS125R	65	(Germany) Alexander Folger	5, 10, 13
F.C.C. Technical Sports	Honda	Honda RS125R	20	(Japan) Tomomi Manako	All
F.C.C. Technical Sports	Honda	Honda RS125R	21	(Japan) Tomoko Igata	All
Debbia Team Semprucci	Yamaha	Yamaha TZ125	24	(Italy) Gabriele Debbia	All
Scuderia Alfa Ducados	Aprilia	Aprilia RS125R	25	(Italy) Vittorio Lopez	1–6
Scuderia Alfa Ducados	Aprilia	Aprilia RS125R	40	(Italy) Massimiliano d’Agnano	??
Scot-San Patrignano	Honda	Honda RS125R	26	(Spain) Emilio Alzamora	All
Scot-San Patrignano	Honda	Honda RS125R	27	(Italy) Ivan Cremonini	1–4, 6
Scot-San Patrignano	Honda	Honda RS125R	38	(Italy) Luigi Ancona	5, 7–13
Moto Bum Team Harc Pro	Honda	Honda RS125R	28	(Japan) Takehiro Yamamoto	All
Racing Supply	Honda	Honda RS125R	29	(Japan) Yoshiyuki Sugai	3–13
Racing Supply	Honda	Honda RS125R	33	(Japan) Tetsu Ito	2
Scott-Attac! Team	Honda	Honda RS125R	31	(Germany) Stefan Kurfiss	1–3, 5–9
Scott-Attac! Team	Honda	Honda RS125R	39	(Spain) Luis Alvaro	4, 13
Scott-Attac! Team	Honda	Honda RS125R	44	(United Kingdom) Darren Barton	9–11, 13
Elf Team Kepla	Honda	Honda RS125R	32	(Japan) Hiroyuki Kikuchi	All
Techno Motor Engineering	Yamaha	Yamaha TZ125	56	(Japan) Shigeru Ibaraki	3
Techno Motor Engineering	Yamaha	Yamaha TZ125	57	(Japan) Youichi Ui	3
Hong Leong Yamaha	Yamaha	Yamaha TZ125	53	(Malaysia) Soong Chee Keong	2

Key
Regular Rider
Wildcard Rider
Replacement Rider

== Results and standings ==
=== Grands Prix ===
Round	Date	Race	Location	125cc winner	250cc winner	500cc winner	Report
1	26 March	(Australia) Australian motorcycle Grand Prix	Eastern Creek	(Japan) Haruchika Aoki	(Germany) Ralf Waldmann	(Australia) Mick Doohan	Report
2	2 April	(Malaysia) Malaysian motorcycle Grand Prix	Shah Alam	(Australia) Garry McCoy	(Italy) Max Biaggi	(Australia) Mick Doohan	Report
3	23 April	(Japan) Japanese motorcycle Grand Prix	Suzuka	(Japan) Haruchika Aoki	(Germany) Ralf Waldmann	(Australia) Daryl Beattie	Report
4	7 May	(Spain) Spanish motorcycle Grand Prix	Jerez	(Japan) Haruchika Aoki	(Japan) Tetsuya Harada	(Spain) Alberto Puig	Report
5	21 May	(Germany) German motorcycle Grand Prix	Nürburgring	(Japan) Haruchika Aoki	(Italy) Max Biaggi	(Australia) Daryl Beattie	Report
6	11 June	(Italy) Italian motorcycle Grand Prix	Mugello	(Japan) Haruchika Aoki	(Italy) Max Biaggi	(Australia) Mick Doohan	Report
7	24 June ††	(Netherlands) Dutch TT	Assen	(Germany) Dirk Raudies	(Italy) Max Biaggi	(Australia) Mick Doohan	Report
8	9 July	(France) French motorcycle Grand Prix	Le Mans	(Japan) Haruchika Aoki	(Germany) Ralf Waldmann	(Australia) Mick Doohan	Report
9	23 July	(United Kingdom) British motorcycle Grand Prix	Donington	(Japan) Kazuto Sakata	(Italy) Max Biaggi	(Australia) Mick Doohan	Report
10	20 August	Czech Republic motorcycle Grand Prix	Brno	(Japan) Kazuto Sakata	(Italy) Max Biaggi	(Italy) Luca Cadalora	Report
11	17 September	(Rio de Janeiro (state)) Rio de Janeiro motorcycle Grand Prix	Rio de Janeiro	(Japan) Masaki Tokudome	(Italy) Doriano Romboni	(Italy) Luca Cadalora	Report
12	24 September	(Argentina) Argentine motorcycle Grand Prix	Buenos Aires	(Spain) Emilio Alzamora	(Italy) Max Biaggi	(Australia) Mick Doohan	Report
13	8 October	(Europe) European motorcycle Grand Prix	Catalunya	(Japan) Haruchika Aoki	(Italy) Max Biaggi	(Spain) Àlex Crivillé	Report

†† = Saturday race

=== 500cc riders' standings ===
Scoring system

Points are awarded to the top fifteen finishers. A rider has to finish the race to earn points.

Position	**1st**	**2nd**	**3rd**	**4th**	**5th**	**6th**	**7th**	**8th**	**9th**	**10th**	**11th**	**12th**	**13th**	**14th**	**15th**
Points	25	20	16	13	11	10	9	8	7	6	5	4	3	2	1

Pos	Rider	Bike	AUS (Australia)	MAL (Malaysia)	JPN (Japan)	ESP (Spain)	GER (Germany)	ITA (Italy)	NED (Netherlands)	FRA (France)	GBR (United Kingdom)	CZE (Czech Republic)	RIO (Rio de Janeiro (state))	ARG (Argentina)	EUR (Europe)	Pts
1	(Australia) Mick Doohan	Honda NSR500	**1**	**1**	**2**	**Ret**	**Ret**	**1**	1	**1**	**1**	2	**2**	1	4	248
2	(Australia) Daryl Beattie	Suzuki RGV500	2	2	1	7	1	2		3	2	3	4	2	5	215
3	(Italy) Luca Cadalora	Yamaha YZR500	4	Ret	4	2	2	12	7	2	5	**1**	1	**3**	**Ret**	176
4	(Spain) Àlex Crivillé	Honda NSR500	3	3	Ret	3	4	5	**2**	Ret	3	6	6	4	1	166
5	(Japan) Shinichi Ito	Honda NSR500	10	7	Ret	8	3	4	8	4	6	5	10	9	2	127
6	(Italy) Loris Capirossi	Honda NSR500	8	Ret	Ret	6	6	9	4		4	4	9	5	3	108
7	(Brazil) Alex Barros	Honda NSR500	6	6	Ret	5	7	7	5	5	Ret	9	8	8	6	104
8	(Spain) Alberto Puig	Honda NSR500	7	5	5	1	5	3	3							99
9	(Japan) Norifumi Abe	Yamaha YZR500	9	Ret	9	4	8	6	6	Ret	18	Ret	3	6	Ret	81
10	(Italy) Loris Reggiani	Aprilia RSW-2 500	11	8	10	Ret	9	8	9	Ret	Ret	7	Ret	Ret	7	59
11	(United Kingdom) Neil Hodgson	ROC-Yamaha	20	Ret	14	12	14	14	13	8	7	10	11	10	9	54
12	(Spain) Juan Borja	ROC-Yamaha	Ret	9	7	9	10	16	10	Ret	8	12	Ret	11	Ret	52
13	(United States) Scott Russell	Suzuki RGV500						11	12	6		11	5		8	43
14	(France) Bernard Garcia	ROC-Yamaha	13	10	11	Ret	17	13	11	Ret	9	13	Ret	12	11	41
15	(United States) Kevin Schwantz	Suzuki RGV500	5	4	6											34
16	(Spain) Carlos Checa	Honda NSR500									Ret	8	7	7	Ret	26
17	(Switzerland) Adrian Bosshard	ROC-Yamaha	15	Ret	15	Ret	12	17	15	11	10	15	15	15	Ret	21
18	(Belgium) Laurent Naveau	ROC-Yamaha	16	Ret	17	13	13	19		10		14	13	16	12	21
19	(United Kingdom) Jeremy McWilliams	Yamaha YZR500	Ret	14	Ret	11	Ret	Ret	18	7	Ret	16	12	Ret	17	20
20	(Japan) Toshiyuki Arakaki	Harris-Yamaha			8		Ret			9	11					20
21	(Italy) Cristiano Migliorati	Harris-Yamaha	14	12	18	10	11	Ret	17	Ret	Ret	Ret	Ret	20	16	17
22	(United Kingdom) Sean Emmett	Harris-Yamaha	12	Ret	13	Ret		Ret	Ret	Ret	13	Ret	14	14	13	17
23	(Japan) Takuma Aoki	Honda NSR500			3											16
24	(United Kingdom) James Haydon	Harris-Yamaha	23	Ret	Ret	Ret	Ret	18	14	Ret	Ret	Ret	16	13	10	11
25	(France) Frédéric Protat	ROC-Yamaha	18	11	23	Ret	18	Ret	Ret	12	16	17	17	Ret	Ret	9
26	(France) Marc Garcia	ROC-Yamaha	24	13	16	Ret	16	15	Ret	13	Ret	20	Ret	17	14	9
27	(Italy) Pierfrancesco Chili	Cagiva GP500						10								6
28	(France) Bruno Bonhuil	ROC-Yamaha	27	17	19	15	19	21	Ret	16	12	21				5
29	(New Zealand) Andrew Stroud	ROC-Yamaha	17	15	12	Ret	Ret	Ret	19							5
30	(United Kingdom) Eugene McManus	Harris-Yamaha	21	Ret	21	14	21	Ret	16	Ret	14	19	18	18	18	4
31	(Switzerland) Bernard Haenggeli	ROC-Yamaha	26	16	Ret	17	Ret	Ret	20	14	17	22	Ret	Ret	20	2
32	(France) Philippe Monneret	ROC-Yamaha								15						1
33	(United Kingdom) Chris Walker	Harris-Yamaha									15	18				1
34	(France) Jean-Pierre Jeandat	Paton	Ret	19	20	Ret	15	Ret	Ret	Ret	Ret		Ret	Ret	Ret	1
35	(Italy) Lucio Pedercini	ROC-Yamaha	22	Ret	22	Ret	Ret	20	21	Ret	Ret	Ret	19	19	15	1
	(United Kingdom) Brian Morrison	Harris-Yamaha				16										0
	(United States) Scott Gray	ROC-Yamaha	Ret	Ret	Ret	Ret	Ret	22	Ret	17	Ret			Ret	Ret	0
	(United Kingdom) Jamie Robinson	Harris-Yamaha	25	18												0
	(France) Jose Kuhn	ROC-Yamaha										Ret	21	Ret	19	0
	(Australia) Martin Craggill	Harris-Yamaha	19													0
	(United Kingdom) Lee Pullan	Harris-Yamaha											20	21	21	0
	(Switzerland) Nicholas Schmassman	ROC-Yamaha					20									0
	(Italy) Marco Papa	ROC-Yamaha								Ret	Ret	23	Ret	Ret	Ret	0
	(United States) Jim Filice	Harris-Yamaha				Ret		23	Ret							0
	(Japan) Toshihiko Honma	Yamaha YZR500			Ret											0
	(Venezuela) Antonio Irizar	Harris-Yamaha					Ret									0
	(Netherlands) Cees Doorakkers	Harris-Yamaha							Ret							0
	(Spain) Enrique De Juan	ROC-Yamaha													Ret	0
Pos	Rider	Bike	AUS (Australia)	MAL (Malaysia)	JPN (Japan)	ESP (Spain)	GER (Germany)	ITA (Italy)	NED (Netherlands)	FRA (France)	GBR (United Kingdom)	CZE (Czech Republic)	RIO (Rio de Janeiro (state))	ARG (Argentina)	EUR (Europe)	Pts

Colour	Result
Gold	Winner
Silver	Second place
Bronze	Third place
Green	Points classification
Blue	Non-points classification
Blue	Non-classified finish (NC)
Purple	Retired, not classified (Ret)
Red	Did not qualify (DNQ)
Red	Did not pre-qualify (DNPQ)
Black	Disqualified (DSQ)
White	Did not start (DNS)
White	Withdrew (WD)
White	Race cancelled (C)
Blank	Did not practice (DNP)
Blank	Did not arrive (DNA)
Blank	Excluded (EX)

**Bold** – Pole
Italics – Fastest Lap

=== 250cc riders' standings ===
Scoring system

Points are awarded to the top fifteen finishers. A rider has to finish the race to earn points.

Position	**1st**	**2nd**	**3rd**	**4th**	**5th**	**6th**	**7th**	**8th**	**9th**	**10th**	**11th**	**12th**	**13th**	**14th**	**15th**
Points	25	20	16	13	11	10	9	8	7	6	5	4	3	2	1

Pos	Rider	Bike	AUS (Australia)	MAL (Malaysia)	JPN (Japan)	ESP (Spain)	GER (Germany)	ITA (Italy)	NED (Netherlands)	FRA (France)	GBR (United Kingdom)	CZE (Czech Republic)	RIO (Rio de Janeiro (state))	ARG (Argentina)	EUR (Europe)	Pts
1	(Italy) Max Biaggi	Aprilia	**3**	**1**	9	2	**1**	**1**	**1**	**2**	**1**	**1**	**2**	1	1	283
2	(Japan) Tetsuya Harada	Yamaha	2	2	**4**	**1**	2	2	DNS	5	2	2	5	2	**2**	220
3	(Germany) Ralf Waldmann	Honda	1	4	1	5	NC	4	2	1	3	3	4	6	3	203
4	(Japan) Tadayuki Okada	Honda	Ret	3	Ret	6	3	5	3	3	8	7	3	7	7	136
5	(France) Jean-Philippe Ruggia	Honda	NC	5	5	7	5	9	4	8	5	6	6	5	13	115
6	(Japan) Nobuatsu Aoki	Honda	5	7	2	8	8	7	7	Ret	10	9	8	Ret	6	105
7	(Spain) Luis D'Antin	Honda	Ret	8	Ret	3	9	NC	9	7	11	4	10	12	4	88
8	(United States) Kenny Roberts Jr.	Yamaha	7	9	Ret	Ret	4	6	5	6	Ret	8	13	Ret	5	82
9	(Italy) Doriano Romboni	Honda	6	NC	NC	4				NC		5	1	3		75
10	(France) Olivier Jacque	Honda	Ret	10	Ret	12	11	16	Ret	9	4	14	7	4	9	66
11	(Germany) Jürgen Fuchs	Honda	10	17	12	13	NC	15	10	12	12	10	11	8	8	55
12	(Netherlands) Jurgen van den Goorbergh	Honda	11	11	10	19	12	Ret	6	14	7	Ret	Ret	9	14	50
13	(Spain) Carlos Checa	Honda	4	Inj	Ret	Ret	7	11	11	4						45
14	(Switzerland) Eskil Suter	Aprilia	13	12	8	Ret	Ret	10	Ret	10	9	Ret	12		11	43
15	(France) Jean-Michel Bayle	Aprilia	NC	6	NC	9	6	NC	NC	11	NC	11	NC	**NC**	NC	37
16	(Spain) José Luis Cardoso	Aprilia	8	13	7	17	17	12	NC	NC	16	13	14	NC	12	33
17	(Italy) Roberto Locatelli	Aprilia	Ret		18	10		13	Ret		14	15	9	10	10	31
18	(United Kingdom) Niall Mackenzie	Aprilia	NC	NC	NC	11	14	NC	12	19	6	NC	19	11	NC	26
19	(Italy) Marcellino Lucchi	Aprilia					10	3								22
20	(Netherlands) Patrick van den Goorbergh	Aprilia	NC	14	NC	16	13	8	14	13	NC	12	18	NC	16	22
21	(Japan) Sadanori Hikita	Honda	Ret	20	3	NC	15	14	NC	NC	19					19
22	(Japan) Takeshi Tsujimura	Honda	9	18	NC	NC			NC	NC	13		17	15	15	12
23	(Italy) Alessandro Gramigni	Honda				14		NC	8	15					NC	11
24	(Japan) Osamu Miyazaki	Aprilia			6											10
25	(Germany) Adi Stadler	Aprilia	12	16	NC	18	16	NC	13	16	18	16	20	NC	NC	7
26	(Spain) Luis Carlos Maurel	Honda	NC	NC	11	21	NC	NC	NC	17	23	17	15	18	17	6
27	(France) Régis Laconi	Honda	NC	21	15	20	NC	19	NC	NC	15	21	NC	14	NC	4
28	(Germany) Bernd Kassner	Aprilia	Ret	23	13	22	NC	21	16	NC	NC	19	21	NC	Ret	3
29	(Argentina) Sebastián Porto	Aprilia												13		3
30	(Australia) Marcus Payten	Yamaha	14													2
30	(Japan) Masaki Morikane	Honda			14											2
32	(Spain) Gregorio Lavilla	Honda	15	22	NC	23	18	22	15	18	22	18	NC	19	24	2
32	(Switzerland) Oliver Petrucciani	Aprilia	NC	15	19	15	NC	17	NC	20	20	22			20	2
Pos	Rider	Bike	AUS (Australia)	MAL (Malaysia)	JPN (Japan)	ESP (Spain)	GER (Germany)	ITA (Italy)	NED (Netherlands)	FRA (France)	GBR (United Kingdom)	CZE (Czech Republic)	RIO (Rio de Janeiro (state))	ARG (Argentina)	EUR (Europe)	Pts

Colour	Result
Gold	Winner
Silver	Second place
Bronze	Third place
Green	Points classification
Blue	Non-points classification
Blue	Non-classified finish (NC)
Purple	Retired, not classified (Ret)
Red	Did not qualify (DNQ)
Red	Did not pre-qualify (DNPQ)
Black	Disqualified (DSQ)
White	Did not start (DNS)
White	Withdrew (WD)
White	Race cancelled (C)
Blank	Did not practice (DNP)
Blank	Did not arrive (DNA)
Blank	Excluded (EX)

**Bold** – Pole
Italics – Fastest Lap

=== 125cc riders' standings ===
Scoring system

Points are awarded to the top fifteen finishers. A rider has to finish the race to earn points.

Position	**1st**	**2nd**	**3rd**	**4th**	**5th**	**6th**	**7th**	**8th**	**9th**	**10th**	**11th**	**12th**	**13th**	**14th**	**15th**
Points	25	20	16	13	11	10	9	8	7	6	5	4	3	2	1

Pos	Rider	Bike	AUS (Australia)	MAL (Malaysia)	JPN (Japan)	ESP (Spain)	GER (Germany)	ITA (Italy)	NED (Netherlands)	FRA (France)	GBR (United Kingdom)	CZE (Czech Republic)	RIO (Rio de Janeiro (state))	ARG (Argentina)	EUR (Europe)	Pts
1	(Japan) Haruchika Aoki	Honda	1	**18**	1	1	1	1	5	**1**	Ret	2	3	14	**1**	224
2	(Japan) Kazuto Sakata	Aprilia	2	10	**3**	**6**	**Ret**	**5**	4	12	1	**1**	Ret	Ret	4	140
3	(Spain) Emilio Alzamora	Honda	4	23	7	7	3	NC	NC	7	3	10	10	**1**	2	129
4	(Japan) Akira Saito	Honda	11	3	2	8	NC	7	3	4	Ret	3	6	4	7	127
5	(Germany) Dirk Raudies	Honda	**NC**	7	NC	3	5	NC	1	2	4	NC	8	3	5	124.5
6	(Italy) Stefano Perugini	Aprilia	6	2	NC	2	4	2	7	6	**2**	NC	**NC**	NC	10	118
7	(Japan) Masaki Tokudome	Aprilia	12	15	NC	15	NC	3	NC	8	6	4	1	2	8	105.5
8	(Japan) Tomomi Manako	Honda	3	24	10	9	9	6	9	5	NC	8	9	9	3	102
9	(Japan) Hideyuki Nakajoh	Honda	7	12	4	17	6	11	**8**	11	5	5	12	10	12	88
10	(Germany) Peter Öttl	Aprilia	NC	17	11	4		4	2	3	NC	NC	18	7	NC	76
11	(Spain) Herri Torrontegui	Honda	NC	4	9	10	NC	NC	6	10	12	12	4	6	NC	66.5
12	(Japan) Noboru Ueda	Honda	5	21	14	5	2	NC	NC	13	NC	9	5	13	NC	65
13	(Italy) Gianluigi Scalvini	Aprilia	8	11	NC	11	10	12	10	Ret	NC	6	2	NC	Ret	61.5
14	(Japan) Yoshiaki Katoh	Yamaha	10	NC	6	16	11	8	12	9	NC		15	12	6	55
15	(Germany) Manfred Geissler	Aprilia	NC	NC	13	NC	7	10	13	17	7	11	19	16	NC	35
16	(Japan) Ken Miyasaka	Honda	16	13	8	NC	8	9	NC	NC	14	13	20	NC	22	29.5
17	(Germany) Oliver Koch	Aprilia	15	19	NC	14		NC	NC	14	11	14	NC	5	11	28
18	(Spain) Jorge Martinez	Yamaha	13	20	NC	13	NC	NC	NC	NC	8	18	11	8	NC	27
19	(Japan) Takehiro Yamamoto	Honda	NC	6	16	18	13	14	NC	19	10	NC	13	11	NC	24
20	(United Kingdom) Darren Barton	Yamaha									9	NC	7		9	23
21	(Japan) Tomoko Igata	Honda	14	8	18	25	Ret	16	11	13	16	7	17	NC	Ret	23
22	(Australia) Garry McCoy	Honda	Ret	1	Ret	14										16.5
23	(Japan) Shigeru Ibaraki	Yamaha			5											11
24	(Italy) Andrea Ballerini	Aprilia	NC	5	NC	20		13	NC		NC	19	NC	NC	14	10.5
25	(Italy) Luigi Ancona	Honda					12		14	16	15	17	NC	NC	13	10
26	(Japan) Yoshiyuki Sugai	Honda			12	23	14	18	NC	Ret	18	15	21	15	NC	8
27	(Italy) Gabriele Debbia	Yamaha	NC	9	21	26	NC	19	18	15	13	NC	NC	18	17	7.5
28	(Netherlands) Loek Bodelier	Aprilia	9	NC	19	NC	NC	NC								7
29	(Germany) Stefan Prein	Yamaha	18	14	NC	NC	NC	17	19	NC						4
29	(Germany) Stefan Prein	Honda										NC	14	17	15	4
30	(Spain) Josep Sarda	Honda				22		15	15	Ret	NC	16	16	NC		2
31	(Japan) Youichi Ui	Yamaha			15											1
31	(Germany) Stefan Kurfiss	Yamaha	19	NC	22		15	NC	NC	20	22					1
Pos	Rider	Bike	AUS (Australia)	MAL (Malaysia)	JPN (Japan)	ESP (Spain)	GER (Germany)	ITA (Italy)	NED (Netherlands)	FRA (France)	GBR (United Kingdom)	CZE (Czech Republic)	RIO (Rio de Janeiro (state))	ARG (Argentina)	EUR (Europe)	Pts

Colour	Result
Gold	Winner
Silver	Second place
Bronze	Third place
Green	Points classification
Blue	Non-points classification
Blue	Non-classified finish (NC)
Purple	Retired, not classified (Ret)
Red	Did not qualify (DNQ)
Red	Did not pre-qualify (DNPQ)
Black	Disqualified (DSQ)
White	Did not start (DNS)
White	Withdrew (WD)
White	Race cancelled (C)
Blank	Did not practice (DNP)
Blank	Did not arrive (DNA)
Blank	Excluded (EX)

**Bold** – Pole
Italics – Fastest Lap

† Half-points awarded in Malaysia, as the riders did not complete the sufficient distance for full points.
