= 1995 Italian motorcycle Grand Prix =

(Italy) 1995 Italian Grand Prix
Race details
- Race 6 of 13 races in the 1995 Grand Prix motorcycle racing season
- Date: 11 June 1995
- Official name: Gran Premio d'Italia
- Location: Autodromo Internazionale del Mugello
- Course: Permanent racing facility; 5.245 km (3.259 mi)

MotoGP
Pole position
- Rider: (Australia) Mick Doohan
- Time: 1:53.524
Fastest lap
- Rider: (Australia) Mick Doohan
- Time: 1:54.381
Podium
- First: (Australia) Mick Doohan
- Second: (Australia) Daryl Beattie
- Third: (Spain) Alberto Puig

250cc
Pole position
- Rider: (Italy) Max Biaggi
- Time: 1:55.047
Fastest lap
- Rider: (Italy) Max Biaggi
- Time: 1:56.188
Podium
- First: (Italy) Max Biaggi
- Second: (Japan) Tetsuya Harada
- Third: (Italy) Marcellino Lucchi

125cc
Pole position
- Rider: (Japan) Kazuto Sakata
- Time: 2:02.213
Fastest lap
- Rider: (Japan) Masaki Tokudome
- Time: 2:02.810
Podium
- First: (Japan) Haruchika Aoki
- Second: (Italy) Stefano Perugini
- Third: (Japan) Masaki Tokudome

The 1995 Italian motorcycle Grand Prix was the sixth race of the 1995 Grand Prix motorcycle racing season. It took place on 11 June 1995 at the Mugello Circuit.

== 500 cc classification ==
Pos.	Rider	Team	Manufacturer	Time/Retired	Points
1	(Australia) Mick Doohan	Repsol YPF Honda Team	Honda	44:20.790	25
2	(Australia) Daryl Beattie	Lucky Strike Suzuki	Suzuki	+3.728	20
3	(Spain) Alberto Puig	Fortuna Honda Pons	Honda	+8.922	16
4	(Japan) Shinichi Itoh	Repsol YPF Honda Team	Honda	+14.436	13
5	(Spain) Àlex Crivillé	Repsol YPF Honda Team	Honda	+16.310	11
6	(Japan) Norifumi Abe	Marlboro Team Roberts	Yamaha	+16.370	10
7	(Brazil) Alex Barros	Kanemoto Honda	Honda	+16.418	9
8	(Italy) Loris Reggiani	Aprilia Racing Team	Aprilia	+34.747	8
9	(Italy) Loris Capirossi	Marlboro Team Pileri	Honda	+40.914	7
10	(Italy) Pierfrancesco Chili	Cagiva Corse	Cagiva	+54.732	6
11	(United States) Scott Russell	Lucky Strike Suzuki	Suzuki	+1:00.252	5
12	(Italy) Luca Cadalora	Marlboro Team Roberts	Yamaha	+1:02.752	4
13	(France) Bernard Garcia	Team ROC NRJ	ROC Yamaha	+1:03.344	3
14	(United Kingdom) Neil Hodgson	World Championship Motorsports	ROC Yamaha	+1:26.947	2
15	(France) Marc Garcia	DR Team Shark	ROC Yamaha	+1:34.550	1
16	(Spain) Juan Borja	Team ROC NRJ	ROC Yamaha	+1:35.222	
17	(Switzerland) Adrien Bosshard	Thommen Elf Racing	ROC Yamaha	+1:39.848	
18	(United Kingdom) James Haydon	Harris Grand Prix	Harris Yamaha	+1:48.218	
19	(Belgium) Laurent Naveau	Team ROC	ROC Yamaha	+1:56.204	
20	(Italy) Lucio Pedercini	Team Pedercini	ROC Yamaha	+1 Lap	
21	(France) Bruno Bonhuil	MTD	ROC Yamaha	+1 Lap	
22	(United States) Scott Gray	Starsport	Harris Yamaha	+1 Lap	
23	(United States) Jim Filice	Padgett's Racing Team	Harris Yamaha	+1 Lap	
Ret	(United Kingdom) Eugene McManus	Padgett's Racing Team	Harris Yamaha	Retirement	
Ret	(Italy) Cristiano Migliorati	Harris Grand Prix	Harris Yamaha	Retirement	
Ret	(Switzerland) Bernard Haenggeli	Haenggeli Racing	ROC Yamaha	Retirement	
Ret	(New Zealand) Andrew Stroud	Team Max	ROC Yamaha	Retirement	
Ret	(United Kingdom) Jeremy McWilliams	Millar Racing	Harris Yamaha	Retirement	
Ret	(France) Jean Pierre Jeandat	JPJ Paton	Paton	Retirement	
Ret	(United Kingdom) Sean Emmett	Harris Grand Prix	Harris Yamaha	Retirement	

== 250 cc classification ==
Pos	Rider	Manufacturer	Time/Retired	Points
1	(Italy) Max Biaggi	Aprilia	41:06.276	25
2	(Japan) Tetsuya Harada	Yamaha	+1.075	20
3	(Italy) Marcellino Lucchi	Aprilia	+4.491	16
4	(Germany) Ralf Waldmann	Honda	+9.814	13
5	(Japan) Tadayuki Okada	Honda	+9.863	11
6	(United States) Kenny Roberts Jr	Yamaha	+32.357	10
7	(Japan) Nobuatsu Aoki	Honda	+32.656	9
8	(Netherlands) Patrick vd Goorbergh	Aprilia	+32.735	8
9	(France) Jean Philippe Ruggia	Honda	+32.885	7
10	(Switzerland) Eskil Suter	Aprilia	+38.291	6
11	(Spain) Carlos Checa	Honda	+46.463	5
12	(Spain) José Luis Cardoso	Aprilia	+51.991	4
13	(Italy) Roberto Locatelli	Aprilia	+52.076	3
14	(Japan) Sadanori Hikita	Honda	+55.139	2
15	(Germany) Jürgen Fuchs	Honda	+55.161	1
16	(France) Olivier Jacque	Honda	+1:01.455	
17	(Switzerland) Olivier Petrucciani	Aprilia	+1:15.373	
18	(Italy) Massimo Ottobre	Aprilia	+1:26.087	
19	(France) Regis Laconi	Honda	+1:33.193	
20	(Italy) Luca Boscoscuro	Aprilia	+1:52.349	
21	(Germany) Bernd Kassner	Aprilia	+1:52.455	
22	(Spain) Gregorio Lavilla	Honda	+1:52.512	
Ret	(Spain) Miguel Angel Castilla	Yamaha	Retirement	
Ret	(Spain) Pere Riba	Aprilia	Retirement	
Ret	(Spain) Luis Maurel	Aprilia	Retirement	
Ret	(Netherlands) Jurgen vd Goorbergh	Honda	Retirement	
Ret	(United Kingdom) Niall Mackenzie	Aprilia	Retirement	
Ret	(Italy) Alessandro Gramigni	Honda	Retirement	
Ret	(Germany) Adolf Stadler	Aprilia	Retirement	
Ret	(France) Jean-Michel Bayle	Aprilia	Retirement	

== 125 cc classification ==
Pos	Rider	Manufacturer	Time/Retired	Points
1	(Japan) Haruchika Aoki	Honda	41:24.470	25
2	(Italy) Stefano Perugini	Aprilia	+0.004	20
3	(Japan) Masaki Tokudome	Aprilia	+0.171	16
4	(Germany) Peter Öttl	Aprilia	+0.240	13
5	(Japan) Kazuto Sakata	Aprilia	+0.359	11
6	(Japan) Tomomi Manako	Honda	+7.345	10
7	(Japan) Akira Saito	Honda	+23.809	9
8	(Japan) Yoshiaki Katoh	Yamaha	+24.060	8
9	(Japan) Ken Miyasaka	Honda	+24.070	7
10	(Germany) Manfred Geissler	Aprilia	+25.185	6
11	(Japan) Hideyuki Nakajo	Honda	+25.866	5
12	(Italy) Gianluigi Scalvini	Aprilia	+26.794	4
13	(Italy) Andrea Ballerini	Aprilia	+27.404	3
14	(Japan) Takehiro Yamamoto	Honda	+40.080	2
15	(Spain) Josep Sarda	Honda	+51.158	1
16	(Japan) Tomoko Igata	Honda	+1:06.718	
17	(Germany) Stefan Prein	Yamaha	+1:09.853	
18	(Japan) Yoshiyuki Sugai	Honda	+1:10.178	
19	(Italy) Gabriele Debbia	Yamaha	+1:10.183	
20	(Italy) Cristian Caliumi	Yamaha	+1:10.250	
21	(Italy) Stefano Cruciani	Honda	+1:10.270	
22	(Italy) Stefano Giannecchini	Aprilia	+1:36.364	
23	(Italy) Ivan Cremonini	Honda	+1 Lap	
24	(Japan) Hiroyuki Kikuchi	Honda	+1 Lap	
Ret	(Germany) Stefan Kurfiss	Yamaha	Retirement	
Ret	(Japan) Noboru Ueda	Honda	Retirement	
Ret	(Spain) Emilio Alzamora	Honda	Retirement	
Ret	(Spain) Herri Torrontegui	Honda	Retirement	
Ret	(Germany) Dirk Raudies	Honda	Retirement	
Ret	(Netherlands) Loek Bodelier	Aprilia	Retirement	
Ret	(Italy) Igor Antonelli	Aprilia	Retirement	
Ret	(Italy) Vittorio Lopez	Aprilia	Retirement	
Ret	(Germany) Oliver Koch	Aprilia	Retirement	

Previous race: 1995 German Grand Prix	FIM Grand Prix World Championship; 1995 season	Next race: 1995 Dutch TT
Previous race: 1994 Italian Grand Prix	Italian Grand Prix	Next race: 1996 Italian Grand Prix
