= Scott Gray (motorcyclist) =

American motorcycle racer

Scott Gray (born in the United States) is an American motorcycle racer.

== Grand Prix motorcycle racing ==
=== By season ===
Season	Class	Motorcycle	Race	Win	Podium	Pole	FLap	Pts	Plcd
1995	500cc	Yamaha	11	0	0	0	0	0	NC
Total			**11**	**0**	**0**	**0**	**0**	**0**	

=== Grand Prix motorcycle racing ===
(key) (Races in bold indicate pole position)

Year	Class	Bike	1	2	3	4	5	6	7	8	9	10	11	12	13	Pos	Pts
1995	500cc	Yamaha	AUS; Ret	MAL; Ret	JPN; Ret	SPA; Ret	GER; Ret	ITA; 22	NED; Ret	FRA; 17	GBR; Ret	CZE	BRA	ARG; Ret	EUR; Ret	NC	0
