= Darren Barton =

British motorcycle racer

- Nationality: British
- Born: 12 November 1974 (age 52); Darwen, England, United Kingdom
Motorcycle racing career statistics
125cc World Championship
Active years	1994–1997
Manufacturers	Honda, Yamaha, Aprilia
Starts / Wins / Podiums / Poles / F. laps / Points; 21 / 0 / 0 / 0 / 0 / 37

Darren Barton (born 12 November 1974) is a British professional motorcycling rider who competed in 125cc Grand Prix 1994–7 and was the 1995, 1997 and 1999 Supercup champion.
