= Akira Saito =

Japanese motorcycle racer

Akira Saito 斉藤明
- Nationality: Japanese
Motorcycle racing career statistics
Grand Prix motorcycle racing
Active years	1991 - 1996
First race	1991 125cc Japanese Grand Prix
Last race	1996 125cc Australian Grand Prix
Team	Honda
Starts / Wins / Podiums / Poles / F. laps / Points; 56 / 0 / 6 / 0 / 2 / 356

Akira Saito (斉藤 明, Saitō Akira; born December 2, 1963) is a former Grand Prix motorcycle road racer from Japan. He enjoyed his best season in 1995 when he finished the season in fourth place in the 125cc world championship.
