= Luis d'Antin =

Spanish motorcycle racer

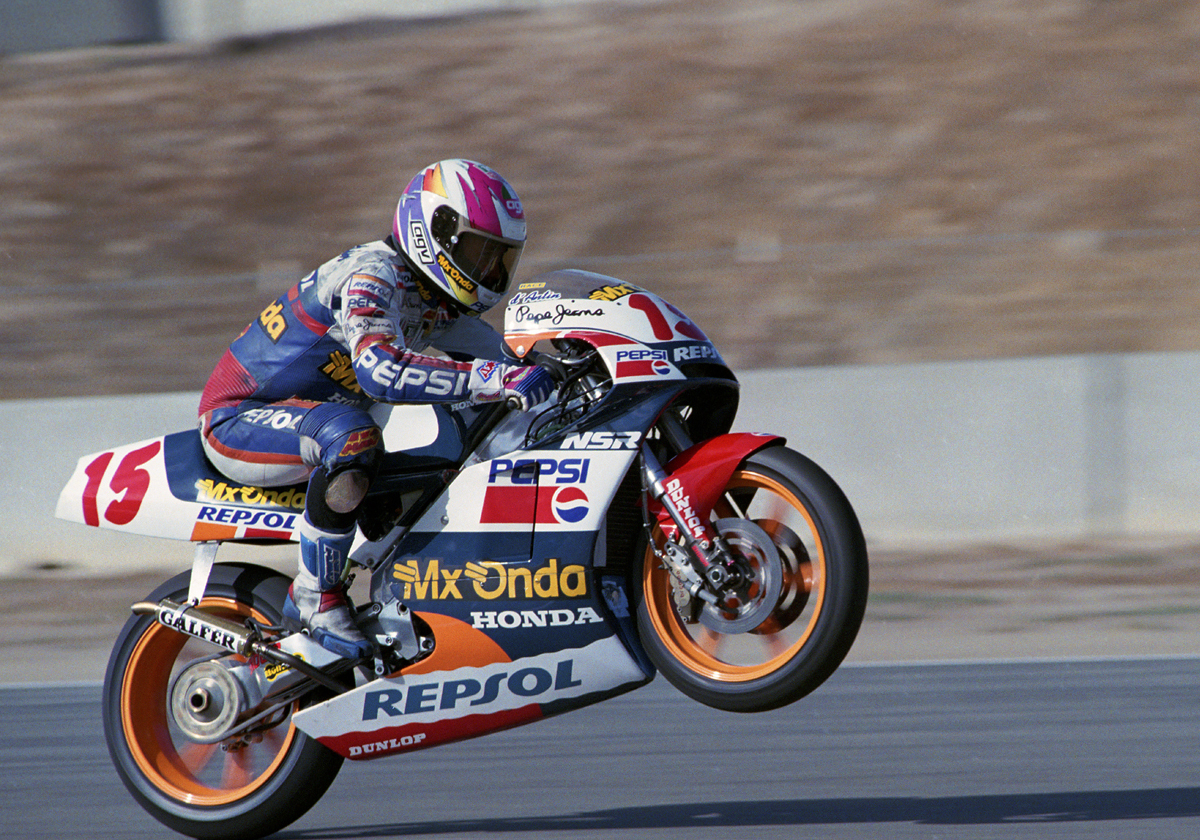
- Luis D'Antin at the U.S. Grand Prix
- Nationality: Spanish
Motorcycle racing career statistics
Grand Prix motorcycle racing
Active years	1989, 1992 - 1998
First race	1989 125cc Spanish Grand Prix
Last race	1998 250cc Argentine Grand Prix
Team(s)	Honda, Yamaha
Championships	0
Starts / Wins / Podiums / Poles / F. laps / Points; 93 / 0 / 3 / 0 / 0 / 475

Luis d'Antin (born 2 January 1964) is a Spanish former professional motorcycle road racer and motorcycle racing team owner. He competed in the Grand Prix motorcycle racing world championships between 1989 and 1998.

== Motorcycle racing career ==
Born in Madrid, Spain, d'Antin had his best year in 1996 when he finished sixth in the 250cc world championship. He also won the European 600cc Championship in 1991.

After his riding career ended, D'Antin formed the D'Antin MotoGP team in 1999. The team used Yamaha motorcycles before becoming Ducati's satellite MotoGP team in 2004. Norick Abe won a 500cc race for the d'Antin team in both 1999 and 2000. In 2008 D'Antin resigned from his position with the team.
