= Gianluigi Scalvini =

Italian motorcycle racer (born 1971)

- Nationality: Italian
Motorcycle racing career statistics
Grand Prix motorcycle racing
Active years	1993 - 2002
First race	1993 125cc Italian Grand Prix
Last race	2002 125cc Dutch TT
First win	1999 125cc Valencia Grand Prix
Last win	1999 125cc South African Grand Prix
Starts / Wins / Podiums / Poles / F. laps / Points; 116 / 2 / 5 / 2 / 2 / 522.5

Gianluigi Scalvini (born 14 April 1971 in Brescia) is an Italian former Grand Prix motorcycle road racer. His best year was in 1999 when he won two Grand Prix races and finished sixth in the 125cc world championship. Scalvini won two Grand Prix races during his career.

== Career statistics ==
=== CIV Championship (Campionato Italiano Velocita) ===
==== Races by year ====
(key) (Races in bold indicate pole position; races in italics indicate fastest lap)

Year	Class	Bike	1	2	3	4	5	Pos	Pts
2002	Supersport	Yamaha	IMO	VAL	**MUG**; 3	MIS1	MIS2	13th	16
