= 1996 Catalan motorcycle Grand Prix =

(Catalonia) 1996 Catalan Grand Prix
Race details
- Race 13 of 15 races in the 1996 Grand Prix motorcycle racing season
- Date: 15 September 1996
- Official name: Gran Premi Marlboro de Catalunya
- Location: Circuit de Catalunya
- Course: Permanent racing facility; 4.727 km (2.937 mi)

500cc
Pole position
- Rider: (Australia) Mick Doohan
- Time: 1:46.201
Fastest lap
- Rider: (Spain) Carlos Checa
- Time: 1:47.183
Podium
- First: (Spain) Carlos Checa
- Second: (Australia) Mick Doohan
- Third: (Spain) Àlex Crivillé

250cc
Pole position
- Rider: (Italy) Max Biaggi
- Time: 1:47.757
Fastest lap
- Rider: (Italy) Max Biaggi
- Time: 1:48.490
Podium
- First: (Italy) Max Biaggi
- Second: (France) Olivier Jacque
- Third: (Germany) Ralf Waldmann

125cc
Pole position
- Rider: (Japan) Youichi Ui
- Time: 1:54.536
Fastest lap
- Rider: (Japan) Tomomi Manako
- Time: 1:54.307
Podium
- First: (Japan) Tomomi Manako
- Second: (Australia) Garry McCoy
- Third: (Japan) Kazuto Sakata

The 1996 Catalan motorcycle Grand Prix was the thirteenth round of the 1996 Grand Prix motorcycle racing season. It took place on 15 September 1996 at the Circuit de Catalunya.

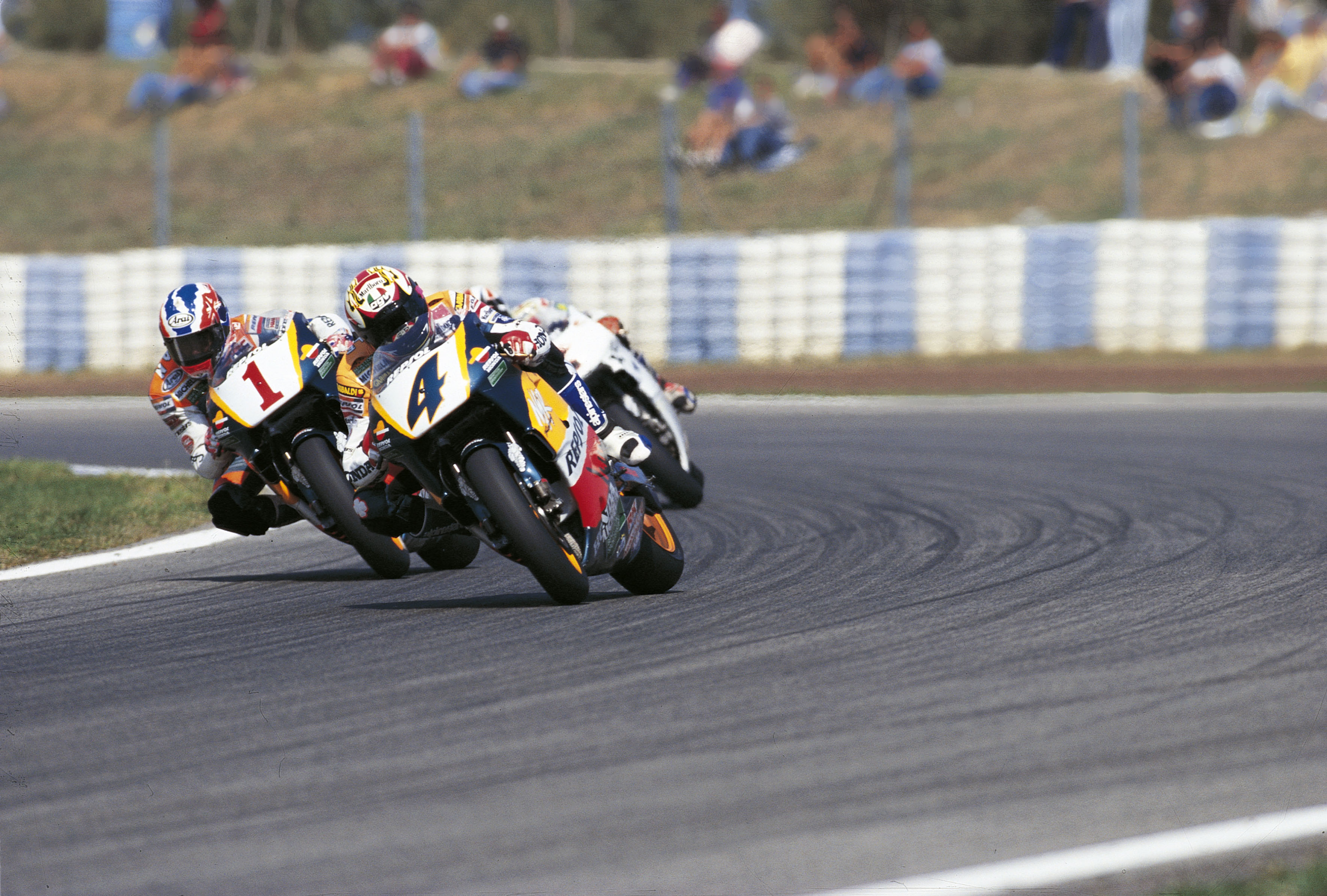
Àlex Crivillé, Mick Doohan and Luca Cadalora, pushing hard to catch race leader and eventual winner Carlos Checa in the 500cc race.

== 500 cc classification ==
Pos.	Rider	Team	Manufacturer	Time/Retired	Points
1	(Spain) Carlos Checa	Fortuna Honda Pons	Honda	44:56.885	25
2	(Australia) Mick Doohan	Team Repsol Honda	Honda	+6.591	20
3	(Spain) Àlex Crivillé	Team Repsol Honda	Honda	+6.640	16
4	(Italy) Luca Cadalora	Kanemoto Honda	Honda	+7.048	13
5	(Japan) Tadayuki Okada	Team Repsol Honda	Honda	+7.129	11
6	(Japan) Shinichi Itoh	Team Repsol Honda	Honda	+21.867	10
7	(Spain) Alberto Puig	Fortuna Honda Pons	Honda	+25.939	9
8	(Brazil) Alex Barros	Honda Pileri	Honda	+26.875	8
9	(Italy) Loris Capirossi	Marlboro Yamaha Roberts	Yamaha	+27.105	7
10	(Japan) Norifumi Abe	Marlboro Yamaha Roberts	Yamaha	+58.628	6
11	(United States) Scott Russell	Lucky Strike Suzuki	Suzuki	+1:02.111	5
12	(United Kingdom) Jeremy McWilliams	QUB Team Optimum	ROC Yamaha	+1:25.019	4
13	(France) Frederic Protat	Soverex FP Racing	ROC Yamaha	+1:39.079	3
14	(Australia) Paul Young	Padgett's Racing Team	Harris Yamaha	+1 Lap	2
15	(United Kingdom) Chris Walker	Elf 500 ROC	Elf 500	+1 Lap	1
Ret	(Italy) Lucio Pedercini	Team Pedercini	ROC Yamaha	Retirement	
Ret	(United Kingdom) Eugene McManus	Millar Racing	Yamaha	Retirement	
Ret	(New Zealand) Andrew Stroud	World Championship Motorsports	ROC Yamaha	Retirement	
Ret	(France) Jean-Michel Bayle	Marlboro Yamaha Roberts	Yamaha	Retirement	
Ret	(Spain) Juan Borja	Elf 500 ROC	Elf 500	Retirement	
Ret	(United States) Kenny Roberts Jr.	Marlboro Yamaha Roberts	Yamaha	Retirement	
Ret	(Switzerland) Adrien Bosshard	Elf 500 ROC	ROC Yamaha	Retirement	
Ret	(United Kingdom) Sean Emmett	Harris Grand Prix	Harris Yamaha	Retirement	
Ret	(Australia) Daryl Beattie	Lucky Strike Suzuki	Suzuki	Retirement	
DNS	(Italy) Doriano Romboni	IP Aprilia Racing Team	Aprilia	Did not start	
DNS	(France) Jean Pierre Jeandat	Team Paton	Paton	Did not start	

== 250 cc classification ==
Pos	Rider	Manufacturer	Time/Retired	Points
1	(Italy) Max Biaggi	Aprilia	42:03.123	25
2	(France) Olivier Jacque	Honda	+10.188	20
3	(Germany) Ralf Waldmann	Honda	+13.476	16
4	(Japan) Tohru Ukawa	Honda	+14.291	13
5	(Germany) Jürgen Fuchs	Honda	+14.433	11
6	(Italy) Marcellino Lucchi	Aprilia	+18.269	10
7	(Japan) Nobuatsu Aoki	Honda	+25.600	9
8	(Italy) Cristiano Migliorati	Honda	+34.269	8
9	(Switzerland) Eskil Suter	Aprilia	+38.493	7
10	(France) Regis Laconi	Honda	+40.120	6
11	(Japan) Takeshi Tsujimura	Honda	+40.150	5
12	(Argentina) Sebastian Porto	Aprilia	+46.555	4
13	(Spain) Luis d'Antin	Honda	+48.011	3
14	(Netherlands) Jurgen vd Goorbergh	Honda	+49.391	2
15	(Japan) Osamu Miyazaki	Aprilia	+53.953	1
16	(Italy) Gianluigi Scalvini	Honda	+54.143	
17	(Italy) Davide Bulega	Aprilia	+54.369	
18	(Italy) Luca Boscoscuro	Aprilia	+54.621	
19	(Italy) Alessandro Antonello	Aprilia	+1:08.015	
20	(Spain) Francisco Riquelme	Honda	+1 Lap	
21	(Spain) Ismael Bonilla	Honda	+1 Lap	
22	(Spain) Vicente Esparragoso	Honda	+1 Lap	
Ret	(Spain) José Luis Cardoso	Aprilia	Retirement	
Ret	(United Kingdom) Jamie Robinson	Aprilia	Retirement	
Ret	(Switzerland) Olivier Petrucciani	Aprilia	Retirement	
Ret	(France) Cristophe Cogan	Honda	Retirement	
Ret	(Spain) Miguel Tey	Honda	Retirement	
Ret	(Venezuela) José Barresi	Yamaha	Retirement	
Ret	(Italy) Franco Battaini	Honda	Retirement	
Ret	(France) Jean-Philippe Ruggia	Honda	Retirement	
Ret	(France) Christian Boudinot	Aprilia	Retirement	
Ret	(Spain) Sete Gibernau	Yamaha	Retirement	

== 125 cc classification ==
Pos	Rider	Manufacturer	Time/Retired	Points
1	(Japan) Tomomi Manako	Honda	42:26.228	25
2	(Australia) Garry McCoy	Aprilia	+1.190	20
3	(Japan) Kazuto Sakata	Aprilia	+6.606	16
4	(Spain) Emilio Alzamora	Honda	+6.754	13
5	(Japan) Haruchika Aoki	Honda	+6.920	11
6	(Japan) Youichi Ui	Yamaha	+6.962	10
7	(Japan) Yoshiaki Katoh	Honda	+6.998	9
8	(Spain) Jorge Martinez	Honda	+7.244	8
9	(Italy) Ivan Goi	Honda	+8.828	7
10	(Germany) Dirk Raudies	Honda	+13.303	6
11	(Japan) Noboru Ueda	Honda	+17.744	5
12	(Spain) Herri Torrontegui	Honda	+19.034	4
13	(Czech Republic) Jaroslav Hules	Honda	+39.015	3
14	(Italy) Mirko Giansanti	Honda	+40.142	2
15	(Italy) Gabriele Debbia	Yamaha	+40.194	1
16	(Spain) Angel Nieto Jr	Aprilia	+49.499	
17	(Spain) Daniel Ribalta	Honda	+58.692	
18	(Spain) David García	Honda	+1:15.975	
Ret	(Germany) Manfred Geissler	Aprilia	Retirement	
Ret	(United Kingdom) Darren Barton	Aprilia	Retirement	
Ret	(Italy) Stefano Perugini	Aprilia	Retirement	
Ret	(Spain) José Antonio Ramirez	Honda	Retirement	
Ret	(Spain) Enrique Maturana	Yamaha	Retirement	
Ret	(France) Frederic Petit	Honda	Retirement	
Ret	(Japan) Masaki Tokudome	Aprilia	Retirement	
Ret	(Italy) Valentino Rossi	Aprilia	Retirement	
Ret	(Netherlands) Loek Bodelier	Honda	Retirement	
Ret	(Spain) Josep Sarda	Honda	Retirement	
Ret	(Italy) Lucio Cecchinello	Honda	Retirement	
Ret	(Japan) Akira Saito	Honda	Retirement	
Ret	(Germany) Peter Öttl	Aprilia	Retirement	

Previous race: 1996 Imola Grand Prix	FIM Grand Prix World Championship; 1996 season	Next race: 1996 Rio de Janeiro Grand Prix
Previous race: None	Catalan Grand Prix	Next race: 1997 Catalan Grand Prix
