= 1996 Austrian motorcycle Grand Prix =

(Austria) 1996 Austrian Grand Prix
Race details
- Race 10 of 15 races in the 1996 Grand Prix motorcycle racing season
- Date: 4 August 1996
- Official name: HB Motorrad Grand Prix Austria
- Location: A1-Ring
- Course: Permanent racing facility; 4.319 km (2.684 mi)

500cc
Pole position
- Rider: (Australia) Mick Doohan
- Time: 1:29.430
Fastest lap
- Rider: (Spain) Àlex Crivillé
- Time: 1:30.112
Podium
- First: (Spain) Àlex Crivillé
- Second: (Australia) Mick Doohan
- Third: (Japan) Norick Abe

250cc
Pole position
- Rider: (France) Olivier Jacque
- Time: 1:33.700
Fastest lap
- Rider: (Germany) Ralf Waldmann
- Time: 1:34.686
Podium
- First: (Germany) Ralf Waldmann
- Second: (Spain) Luis d'Antin
- Third: (Germany) Jürgen Fuchs

125cc
Pole position
- Rider: (Japan) Masaki Tokudome
- Time: 1:41.254
Fastest lap
- Rider: (Germany) Dirk Raudies
- Time: 1:42.002
Podium
- First: (Italy) Ivan Goi
- Second: (Germany) Dirk Raudies
- Third: (Italy) Valentino Rossi

The 1996 Austrian motorcycle Grand Prix was the tenth round of the 1996 Grand Prix motorcycle racing season. It took place on 4 August 1996 at the A1-Ring.

In the 125cc class, a young Valentino Rossi achieved his first grand prix podium.

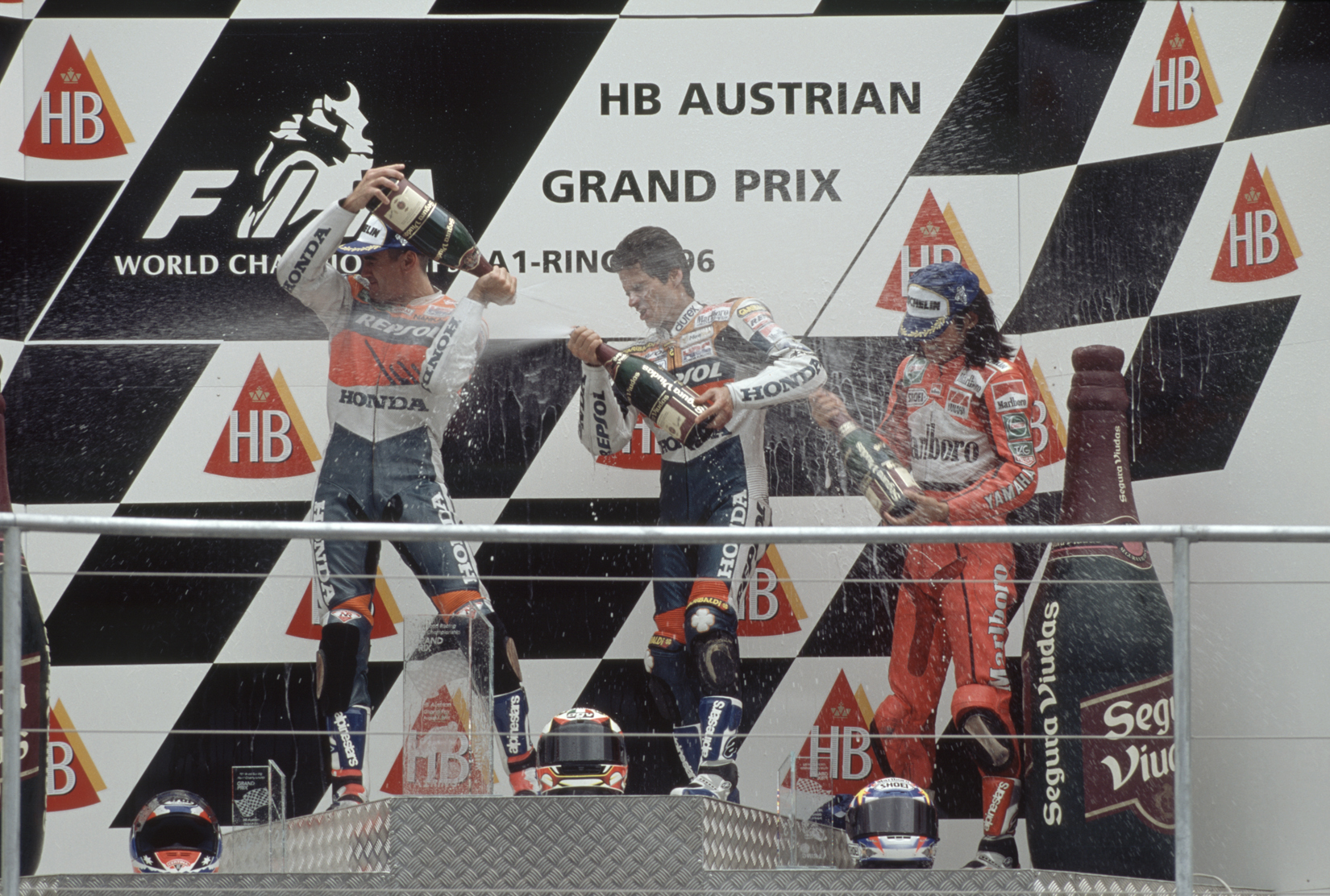
Mick Doohan, Àlex Crivillé and Norifumi Abe, spraying the champagne on the podium after finishing second, first and third in the 500cc race.

== 500 cc classification ==
Pos.	Rider	Team	Manufacturer	Time/Retired	Points
1	(Spain) Àlex Crivillé	Team Repsol Honda	Honda	42:37.024	25
2	(Australia) Mick Doohan	Team Repsol Honda	Honda	+0.500	20
3	(Japan) Norifumi Abe	Marlboro Yamaha Roberts	Yamaha	+4.534	16
4	(Italy) Luca Cadalora	Kanemoto Honda	Honda	+19.470	13
5	(Brazil) Alex Barros	Honda Pileri	Honda	+20.936	11
6	(United States) Scott Russell	Lucky Strike Suzuki	Suzuki	+21.058	10
7	(Spain) Carlos Checa	Fortuna Honda Pons	Honda	+25.632	9
8	(Italy) Loris Capirossi	Marlboro Yamaha Roberts	Yamaha	+25.701	8
9	(France) Jean-Michel Bayle	Marlboro Yamaha Roberts	Yamaha	+25.986	7
10	(Spain) Juan Borja	Elf 500 ROC	Elf 500	+28.046	6
11	(Japan) Tadayuki Okada	Team Repsol Honda	Honda	+32.446	5
12	(United Kingdom) Terry Rymer	Lucky Strike Suzuki	Suzuki	+38.616	4
13	(Spain) Alberto Puig	Fortuna Honda Pons	Honda	+39.031	3
14	(United Kingdom) Jeremy McWilliams	QUB Team Optimum	ROC Yamaha	+1:18.224	2
15	(United Kingdom) Chris Walker	Elf 500 ROC	Elf 500	+1:20.212	1
16	(Italy) Lucio Pedercini	Team Pedercini	ROC Yamaha	+1 Lap	
17	(United Kingdom) James Haydon	World Championship Motorsports	ROC Yamaha	+1 Lap	
18	(Italy) Marcellino Lucchi	IP Aprilia Racing Team	Aprilia	+1 Lap	
19	(United Kingdom) Eugene McManus	Millar Racing	Yamaha	+1 Lap	
20	(Australia) Paul Young	Padgett's Racing Team	Harris Yamaha	+1 Lap	
21	(France) Jean Pierre Jeandat	Team Paton	Paton	+1 Lap	
Ret	(United States) Kenny Roberts Jr.	Marlboro Yamaha Roberts	Yamaha	Retirement	
Ret	(France) Frederic Protat	Soverex FP Racing	ROC Yamaha	Retirement	
Ret	(United Kingdom) Sean Emmett	Harris Grand Prix	Harris Yamaha	Retirement	
Ret	(Switzerland) Adrien Bosshard	Elf 500 ROC	ROC Yamaha	Retirement	
Ret	(Japan) Shinichi Itoh	Team Repsol Honda	Honda	Retirement	

== 250cc classification ==
Pos	Rider	Manufacturer	Time/Retired	Points
1	(Germany) Ralf Waldmann	Honda	41:29.190	25
2	(Spain) Luis d'Antin	Honda	+16.374	20
3	(Germany) Jürgen Fuchs	Honda	+21.140	16
4	(Japan) Tohru Ukawa	Honda	+22.979	13
5	(France) Jean-Philippe Ruggia	Honda	+27.805	11
6	(Japan) Nobuatsu Aoki	Honda	+37.712	10
7	(Italy) Luca Boscoscuro	Aprilia	+37.756	9
8	(Netherlands) Jurgen vd Goorbergh	Honda	+52.913	8
9	(France) Regis Laconi	Honda	+54.232	7
10	(Japan) Takeshi Tsujimura	Honda	+1:01.608	6
11	(Switzerland) Olivier Petrucciani	Aprilia	+1:03.950	5
12	(Italy) Alessandro Antonello	Aprilia	+1:04.462	4
13	(Argentina) Sebastian Porto	Aprilia	+1:17.335	3
14	(France) Christian Boudinot	Aprilia	+1:22.534	2
15	(Japan) Yasumasa Hatakeyama	Honda	+1:26.589	1
16	(Italy) Gianluigi Scalvini	Honda	+1:28.269	
17	(United Kingdom) Jamie Robinson	Aprilia	+1 Lap	
18	(Spain) Sete Gibernau	Honda	+1 Lap	
19	(France) Cristophe Cogan	Honda	+1 Lap	
20	(Austria) Richard Haidegger	Aprilia	+1 Lap	
21	(Austria) Uwe Bolterhauer	Honda	+1 Lap	
22	(Austria) Thomas Stadler	Yamaha	+1 Lap	
Ret	(Austria) Johann Wolfsteiner	Aprilia	Retirement	
Ret	(Japan) Tetsuya Harada	Yamaha	Retirement	
Ret	(Italy) Cristiano Migliorati	Honda	Retirement	
Ret	(Japan) Osamu Miyazaki	Aprilia	Retirement	
Ret	(Italy) Davide Bulega	Aprilia	Retirement	
Ret	(Italy) Roberto Locatelli	Aprilia	Retirement	
Ret	(Spain) José Luis Cardoso	Aprilia	Retirement	
Ret	(Switzerland) Eskil Suter	Aprilia	Retirement	
Ret	(France) Olivier Jacque	Honda	Retirement	
Ret	(Italy) Max Biaggi	Aprilia	Retirement	

== 125cc classification ==
Pos	Rider	Manufacturer	Time/Retired	Points
1	(Italy) Ivan Goi	Honda	41:50.829	25
2	(Germany) Dirk Raudies	Honda	+0.767	20
3	(Italy) Valentino Rossi	Aprilia	+2.322	16
4	(Japan) Masaki Tokudome	Aprilia	+2.739	13
5	(Germany) Peter Öttl	Aprilia	+4.341	11
6	(Spain) Jorge Martinez	Aprilia	+4.910	10
7	(Japan) Youichi Ui	Yamaha	+17.385	9
8	(Japan) Tomomi Manako	Honda	+19.464	8
9	(Japan) Kazuto Sakata	Aprilia	+20.971	7
10	(Germany) Manfred Geissler	Aprilia	+26.469	6
11	(Japan) Noboru Ueda	Honda	+27.666	5
12	(Japan) Akira Saito	Honda	+27.687	4
13	(Spain) Herri Torrontegui	Honda	+38.933	3
14	(Spain) Josep Sarda	Honda	+42.917	2
15	(France) Frederic Petit	Honda	+46.979	1
16	(Japan) Yoshiaki Katoh	Yamaha	+51.963	
17	(Czech Republic) Jaroslav Hules	Honda	+55.754	
18	(Italy) Lucio Cecchinello	Honda	+58.003	
19	(Austria) Harald Danninger	Honda	+1:17.416	
20	(Netherlands) Loek Bodelier	Honda	+1:18.116	
21	(Spain) Angel Nieto Jr	Aprilia	+1:32.504	
22	(Austria) Gerwin Hofer	Honda	+1 Lap	
23	(Austria) Georg Scharl	Honda	+1 Lap	
Ret	(Japan) Haruchika Aoki	Honda	Retirement	
Ret	(Italy) Stefano Perugini	Aprilia	Retirement	
Ret	(United Kingdom) Darren Barton	Aprilia	Retirement	
Ret	(Spain) Emilio Alzamora	Honda	Retirement	
Ret	(Australia) Garry McCoy	Aprilia	Retirement	
Ret	(Italy) Paolo Tessari	Honda	Retirement	
Ret	(Italy) Andrea Ballerini	Aprilia	Retirement	
Ret	(Austria) Bernd Holzleitner	Yamaha	Retirement	
Ret	(Italy) Gabriele Debbia	Yamaha	Retirement	

Previous race: 1996 British Grand Prix	FIM Grand Prix World Championship; 1996 season	Next race: 1996 Czech Republic Grand Prix
Previous race: 1994 Austrian Grand Prix	Austrian Grand Prix	Next race: 1997 Austrian Grand Prix
