= 1996 City of Imola motorcycle Grand Prix =

(Bologna) 1996 City of Imola Grand Prix
Race details
- Race 12 of 15 races in the 1996 Grand Prix motorcycle racing season
- Date: 1 September 1996
- Official name: Gran Premio IP Città di Imola
- Location: Autodromo Enzo e Dino Ferrari
- Course: Permanent racing facility; 4.892 km (3.040 mi)

500cc
Pole position
- Rider: (Australia) Mick Doohan
- Time: 1:50.250
Fastest lap
- Rider: (Spain) Àlex Crivillé
- Time: 1:50.191
Podium
- First: (Australia) Mick Doohan
- Second: (Spain) Àlex Crivillé
- Third: (Japan) Tadayuki Okada

250cc
Pole position
- Rider: (Italy) Max Biaggi
- Time: 1:54.078
Fastest lap
- Rider: (Germany) Ralf Waldmann
- Time: 1:53.594
Podium
- First: (Germany) Ralf Waldmann
- Second: (France) Olivier Jacque
- Third: (Japan) Tohru Ukawa

125cc
Pole position
- Rider: (Spain) Jorge Martínez
- Time: 2:00.818
Fastest lap
- Rider: (Italy) Valentino Rossi
- Time: 2:00.362
Podium
- First: (Japan) Masaki Tokudome
- Second: (Spain) Emilio Alzamora
- Third: (Spain) Jorge Martínez

The 1996 City of Imola motorcycle Grand Prix was the twelfth round of the 1996 Grand Prix motorcycle racing season. It took place on 1 September 1996 at the Autodromo Enzo e Dino Ferrari.

== 500 cc classification ==
Pos.	Rider	Team	Manufacturer	Time/Retired	Points
1	(Australia) Mick Doohan	Team Repsol Honda	Honda	29:40.732	25
2	(Spain) Àlex Crivillé	Team Repsol Honda	Honda	+0.104	20
3	(Japan) Tadayuki Okada	Team Repsol Honda	Honda	+2.286	16
4	(France) Jean-Michel Bayle	Marlboro Yamaha Roberts	Yamaha	+10.041	13
5	(Japan) Norifumi Abe	Marlboro Yamaha Roberts	Yamaha	+12.232	11
6	(Italy) Luca Cadalora	Kanemoto Honda	Honda	+12.366	10
7	(United States) Scott Russell	Lucky Strike Suzuki	Suzuki	+15.473	9
8	(Brazil) Alex Barros	Honda Pileri	Honda	+16.328	8
9	(Japan) Shinichi Itoh	Team Repsol Honda	Honda	+18.499	7
10	(United States) Kenny Roberts Jr.	Marlboro Yamaha Roberts	Yamaha	+18.810	6
11	(Spain) Carlos Checa	Fortuna Honda Pons	Honda	+20.592	5
12	(Spain) Alberto Puig	Fortuna Honda Pons	Honda	+37.194	4
13	(Italy) Lucio Pedercini	Team Pedercini	ROC Yamaha	+51.547	3
14	(Italy) Doriano Romboni	IP Aprilia Racing Team	Aprilia	+1:00.108	2
15	(United Kingdom) Eugene McManus	Millar Racing	Yamaha	+1:01.792	1
16	(United Kingdom) Sean Emmett	Harris Grand Prix	Harris Yamaha	+1:21.254	
17	(France) Jean Pierre Jeandat	Team Paton	Paton	+1:36.087	
18	(Italy) Marco Papa	Team Leone Racing	Paton	+2 Laps	
Ret	(United Kingdom) Terry Rymer	Lucky Strike Suzuki	Suzuki	Retirement	
Ret	(United Kingdom) Chris Walker	Elf 500 ROC	Elf 500	Retirement	
Ret	(United Kingdom) Jeremy McWilliams	QUB Team Optimum	ROC Yamaha	Retirement	
Ret	(Italy) Loris Capirossi	Marlboro Yamaha Roberts	Yamaha	Retirement	
Ret	(France) Frederic Protat	Soverex FP Racing	ROC Yamaha	Retirement	
Ret	(United Kingdom) James Haydon	World Championship Motorsports	ROC Yamaha	Retirement	
Ret	(Spain) Juan Borja	Elf 500 ROC	Elf 500	Retirement	
Ret	(Australia) Paul Young	Padgett's Racing Team	Harris Yamaha	Retirement	
Ret	(Switzerland) Adrien Bosshard	Elf 500 ROC	ROC Yamaha	Retirement	

== 250 cc classification ==
Pos	Rider	Manufacturer	Time/Retired	Points
1	(Germany) Ralf Waldmann	Honda	44:02.620	25
2	(France) Olivier Jacque	Honda	+4.770	20
3	(Japan) Tohru Ukawa	Honda	+5.298	16
4	(Germany) Jürgen Fuchs	Honda	+24.132	13
5	(Italy) Marcellino Lucchi	Aprilia	+24.404	11
6	(Spain) Luis d'Antin	Honda	+37.644	10
7	(Japan) Takeshi Tsujimura	Honda	+42.854	9
8	(Netherlands) Jurgen vd Goorbergh	Honda	+47.826	8
9	(United Kingdom) Jamie Robinson	Aprilia	+52.416	7
10	(Italy) Davide Bulega	Aprilia	+59.142	6
11	(Italy) Gianluigi Scalvini	Honda	+1:01.610	5
12	(Italy) Roberto Locatelli	Aprilia	+1:01.786	4
13	(Spain) José Luis Cardoso	Aprilia	+1:02.000	3
14	(Italy) Luca Boscoscuro	Aprilia	+1:04.224	2
15	(Japan) Yasumasa Hatakeyama	Honda	+1:07.722	1
16	(Japan) Osamu Miyazaki	Aprilia	+1:08.290	
17	(Switzerland) Olivier Petrucciani	Aprilia	+1:08.710	
18	(Spain) Sete Gibernau	Honda	+1:08.836	
19	(Italy) Franco Battaini	Aprilia	+1:13.476	
20	(France) Cristophe Cogan	Honda	+1:13.526	
21	(Italy) Giuseppe Fiorillo	Aprilia	+1:22.800	
22	(Italy) Roberto Rolfo	Aprilia	+1:32.978	
23	(Venezuela) José Barresi	Yamaha	+1 Lap	
Ret	(France) Christian Boudinot	Aprilia	Retirement	
Ret	(Italy) Filippo Cotti	Aprilia	Retirement	
Ret	(Italy) Cristiano Migliorati	Honda	Retirement	
Ret	(Argentina) Sebastian Porto	Aprilia	Retirement	
Ret	(Switzerland) Eskil Suter	Aprilia	Retirement	
Ret	(France) Regis Laconi	Honda	Retirement	
Ret	(France) Jean-Philippe Ruggia	Honda	Retirement	
Ret	(Japan) Haruchika Aoki	Honda	Retirement	
Ret	(Japan) Tetsuya Harada	Yamaha	Retirement	
Ret	(Italy) Max Biaggi	Aprilia	Retirement	

== 125 cc classification ==
Pos	Rider	Manufacturer	Time/Retired	Points
1	(Japan) Masaki Tokudome	Aprilia	42:47.711	25
2	(Spain) Emilio Alzamora	Honda	+0.374	20
3	(Spain) Jorge Martinez	Aprilia	+1.220	16
4	(Australia) Garry McCoy	Aprilia	+3.581	13
5	(Italy) Valentino Rossi	Aprilia	+8.925	11
6	(Japan) Tomomi Manako	Honda	+15.196	10
7	(Italy) Ivan Goi	Honda	+17.475	9
8	(Japan) Yoshiaki Katoh	Yamaha	+24.575	8
9	(Germany) Manfred Geissler	Aprilia	+27.519	7
10	(France) Frederic Petit	Honda	+29.605	6
11	(Japan) Noboru Ueda	Honda	+31.021	5
12	(Japan) Kazuto Sakata	Aprilia	+39.332	4
13	(Czech Republic) Jaroslav Hules	Honda	+40.450	3
14	(Germany) Dirk Raudies	Honda	+47.489	2
15	(Spain) Herri Torrontegui	Honda	+47.967	1
16	(Japan) Akira Saito	Honda	+55.443	
17	(Italy) Paolo Tessari	Honda	+55.669	
18	(United Kingdom) Darren Barton	Aprilia	+55.862	
19	(Spain) Angel Nieto Jr	Aprilia	+1:03.588	
20	(Italy) Andrea Ballerini	Aprilia	+1:13.158	
21	(Italy) Gabriele Debbia	Yamaha	+1:14.440	
22	(Italy) Andrea Zappa	Aprilia	+1:14.453	
23	(Italy) Luigi Ancona	Honda	+1:14.782	
24	(Italy) Ivan Cremonini	Honda	+1:27.373	
25	(Italy) Maurizio Cucchiarini	Honda	+1 Lap	
Ret	(Italy) Stefano Perugini	Aprilia	Retirement	
Ret	(Japan) Youichi Ui	Yamaha	Retirement	
Ret	(Spain) Josep Sarda	Honda	Retirement	
Ret	(Netherlands) Loek Bodelier	Honda	Retirement	
Ret	(Japan) Haruchika Aoki	Honda	Retirement	
Ret	(Italy) Lucio Cecchinello	Honda	Retirement	
Ret	(Germany) Peter Öttl	Aprilia	Retirement	

Previous race: 1996 Czech Republic Grand Prix	FIM Grand Prix World Championship; 1996 season	Next race: 1996 Catalan Grand Prix
Previous race: None	Imola Grand Prix	Next race: 1997 Imola Grand Prix
