= 1996 British motorcycle Grand Prix =

(United Kingdom) 1996 British Grand Prix
Race details
- Race 9 of 15 races in the 1996 Grand Prix motorcycle racing season
- Date: 21 July 1996
- Official name: British Grand Prix
- Location: Donington Park
- Course: Permanent racing facility; 4.023 km (2.500 mi)

500cc
Pole position
- Rider: (Australia) Mick Doohan
- Time: 1:32.426
Fastest lap
- Rider: (United States) Scott Russell
- Time: 1:33.574
Podium
- First: (Australia) Mick Doohan
- Second: (Spain) Àlex Crivillé
- Third: (Japan) Norick Abe

250cc
Pole position
- Rider: (France) Olivier Jacque
- Time: 1:34.397
Fastest lap
- Rider: (Italy) Max Biaggi
- Time: 1:34.968
Podium
- First: (Italy) Max Biaggi
- Second: (Germany) Ralf Waldmann
- Third: (France) Olivier Jacque

125cc
Pole position
- Rider: (Japan) Masaki Tokudome
- Time: 1:39.935
Fastest lap
- Rider: (Japan) Masaki Tokudome
- Time: 1:39.704
Podium
- First: (Italy) Stefano Perugini
- Second: (Japan) Masaki Tokudome
- Third: (Japan) Tomomi Manako

The 1996 British motorcycle Grand Prix was the ninth round of the 1996 Grand Prix motorcycle racing season. It took place on 21 July 1996 at Donington Park.

== 500 cc classification ==
| Pos. | Rider | Team | Manufacturer | Time/Retired | Points |
|---|---|---|---|---|---|
| 1 | (Australia) Mick Doohan | Team Repsol Honda | Honda | 47:11.135 | 25 |
| 2 | (Spain) Àlex Crivillé | Team Repsol Honda | Honda | +3.319 | 20 |
| 3 | (Japan) Norifumi Abe | Marlboro Yamaha Roberts | Yamaha | +9.635 | 16 |
| 4 | (Japan) Tadayuki Okada | Team Repsol Honda | Honda | +9.781 | 13 |
| 5 | (United States) Scott Russell | Lucky Strike Suzuki | Suzuki | +10.411 | 11 |
| 6 | (Italy) Loris Capirossi | Marlboro Yamaha Roberts | Yamaha | +24.825 | 10 |
| 7 | (Brazil) Alex Barros | Honda Pileri | Honda | +32.182 | 9 |
| 8 | (Spain) Juan Borja | Elf 500 ROC | Elf 500 | +32.699 | 8 |
| 9 | (Italy) Luca Cadalora | Kanemoto Honda | Honda | +33.620 | 7 |
| 10 | (Japan) Shinichi Itoh | Team Repsol Honda | Honda | +40.040 | 6 |
| 11 | (Spain) Alberto Puig | Fortuna Honda Pons | Honda | +45.832 | 5 |
| 12 | (Spain) Carlos Checa | Fortuna Honda Pons | Honda | +46.349 | 4 |
| 13 | (United Kingdom) James Haydon | World Championship Motorsports | ROC Yamaha | +1:22.245 | 3 |
| 14 | (France) Frederic Protat | Soverex FP Racing | ROC Yamaha | +1:24.783 | 2 |
| 15 | (Italy) Lucio Pedercini | Team Pedercini | ROC Yamaha | +1:38.843 | 1 |
| 16 | (United Kingdom) Chris Walker | Elf 500 ROC | Elf 500 | +1 Lap | |
| 17 | (United Kingdom) Eugene McManus | Millar Racing | Yamaha | +1 Lap | |
| Ret | (United Kingdom) Terry Rymer | Lucky Strike Suzuki | Suzuki | Retirement | |
| Ret | (United Kingdom) Jeremy McWilliams | QUB Team Optimum | ROC Yamaha | Retirement | |
| Ret | (France) Jean-Michel Bayle | Marlboro Yamaha Roberts | Yamaha | Retirement | |
| Ret | (France) Jean Pierre Jeandat | Team Paton | Paton | Retirement | |
| Ret | (Australia) Paul Young | Padgett's Racing Team | Harris Yamaha | Retirement | |
| Ret | (United States) Kenny Roberts Jr. | Marlboro Yamaha Roberts | Yamaha | Retirement | |

== 250 cc classification ==
| Pos | Rider | Manufacturer | Time/Retired | Points |
|---|---|---|---|---|
| 1 | (Italy) Max Biaggi | Aprilia | 43:04.272 | 25 |
| 2 | (Germany) Ralf Waldmann | Honda | +4.637 | 20 |
| 3 | (France) Olivier Jacque | Honda | +15.054 | 16 |
| 4 | (Germany) Jürgen Fuchs | Honda | +29.396 | 13 |
| 5 | (Japan) Tohru Ukawa | Honda | +38.724 | 11 |
| 6 | (Japan) Takeshi Tsujimura | Honda | +41.050 | 10 |
| 7 | (France) Regis Laconi | Honda | +46.474 | 9 |
| 8 | (Japan) Nobuatsu Aoki | Honda | +49.074 | 8 |
| 9 | (Italy) Cristiano Migliorati | Honda | +1:02.178 | 7 |
| 10 | (Switzerland) Eskil Suter | Aprilia | +1:11.386 | 6 |
| 11 | (Spain) Sete Gibernau | Honda | +1:17.734 | 5 |
| 12 | (Japan) Osamu Miyazaki | Aprilia | +1:18.410 | 4 |
| 13 | (Italy) Alessandro Antonello | Aprilia | +1:18.498 | 3 |
| 14 | (France) Cristophe Cogan | Honda | +1:19.478 | 2 |
| 15 | (Italy) Davide Bulega | Aprilia | +1:19.660 | 1 |
| 16 | (United Kingdom) Scott Smart | Honda | +1:30.237 | |
| 17 | (United Kingdom) Steve Sawford | Aprilia | +1 Lap | |
| 18 | (France) Christian Boudinot | Aprilia | +1 Lap | |
| 19 | (Venezuela) José Barresi | Yamaha | +2 Laps | |
| Ret | (United Kingdom) Jamie Robinson | Aprilia | Retirement | |
| Ret | (Netherlands) Jurgen vd Goorbergh | Honda | Retirement | |
| Ret | (Italy) Marcellino Lucchi | Aprilia | Retirement | |
| Ret | (Japan) Yasumasa Hatakeyama | Honda | Retirement | |
| Ret | (United Kingdom) Jason Vincent | Honda | Retirement | |
| Ret | (Italy) Gianluigi Scalvini | Honda | Retirement | |
| Ret | (Italy) Luca Boscoscuro | Aprilia | Retirement | |
| Ret | (France) Jean-Philippe Ruggia | Honda | Retirement | |
| Ret | (Switzerland) Olivier Petrucciani | Aprilia | Retirement | |
| Ret | (Spain) Luis d'Antin | Honda | Retirement | |

== 125 cc classification ==
| Pos | Rider | Manufacturer | Time/Retired | Points |
|---|---|---|---|---|
| 1 | (Italy) Stefano Perugini | Aprilia | 43:41.678 | 25 |
| 2 | (Japan) Masaki Tokudome | Aprilia | +2.653 | 20 |
| 3 | (Japan) Tomomi Manako | Honda | +6.624 | 16 |
| 4 | (Spain) Jorge Martinez | Aprilia | +15.610 | 13 |
| 5 | (Japan) Kazuto Sakata | Aprilia | +17.576 | 11 |
| 6 | (Japan) Noboru Ueda | Honda | +18.792 | 10 |
| 7 | (Japan) Yoshiaki Katoh | Yamaha | +19.115 | 9 |
| 8 | (Japan) Haruchika Aoki | Honda | +20.757 | 8 |
| 9 | (Italy) Lucio Cecchinello | Honda | +23.746 | 7 |
| 10 | (Japan) Youichi Ui | Yamaha | +31.568 | 6 |
| 11 | (Germany) Peter Öttl | Aprilia | +32.210 | 5 |
| 12 | (Italy) Ivan Goi | Honda | +33.424 | 4 |
| 13 | (United Kingdom) Darren Barton | Aprilia | +41.452 | 3 |
| 14 | (Australia) Garry McCoy | Aprilia | +43.091 | 2 |
| 15 | (Spain) Herri Torrontegui | Honda | +48.544 | 1 |
| 16 | (Italy) Gabriele Debbia | Yamaha | +49.859 | |
| 17 | (Italy) Paolo Tessari | Honda | +51.142 | |
| 18 | (Czech Republic) Jaroslav Hules | Honda | +53.440 | |
| 19 | (Italy) Andrea Ballerini | Aprilia | +1:07.294 | |
| 20 | (Germany) Manfred Geissler | Aprilia | +1:16.420 | |
| 21 | (Spain) Angel Nieto Jr | Aprilia | +1:16.921 | |
| 22 | (United Kingdom) Chris Palmer | Honda | +1 Lap | |
| 23 | (United Kingdom) Robin Appleyard | Honda | +1 Lap | |
| 24 | (United Kingdom) Pete Jennings | Honda | +1 Lap | |
| Ret | (Spain) Emilio Alzamora | Honda | Retirement | |
| Ret | (France) Frederic Petit | Honda | Retirement | |
| Ret | (Germany) Dirk Raudies | Honda | Retirement | |
| Ret | (Italy) Valentino Rossi | Aprilia | Retirement | |
| Ret | (Spain) Josep Sarda | Honda | Retirement | |
| Ret | (Netherlands) Loek Bodelier | Honda | Retirement | |
| Ret | (United Kingdom) Fernando Mendes | Honda | Retirement | |
| Ret | (Japan) Akira Saito | Honda | Retirement | |

| Previous race: 1996 German Grand Prix | FIM Grand Prix World Championship; 1996 season | Next race: 1996 Austrian Grand Prix |
| Previous race: 1995 British Grand Prix | British Grand Prix | Next race: 1997 British Grand Prix |
