= 1996 Dutch TT =

(Netherlands) 1996 Dutch Grand Prix
Race details
- Race 7 of 15 races in the 1996 Grand Prix motorcycle racing season
- Date: 29 June 1996
- Official name: Lucky Strike Dutch Grand Prix
- Location: Assen
- Course: Permanent racing facility; 6.049 km (3.759 mi)

500cc
Pole position
- Rider: (Spain) Àlex Crivillé
- Time: 2:02.262
Fastest lap
- Rider: (Australia) Mick Doohan
- Time: 2:02.779
Podium
- First: (Australia) Mick Doohan
- Second: (Spain) Àlex Crivillé
- Third: (Brazil) Alex Barros

250cc
Pole position
- Rider: (France) Olivier Jacque
- Time: 2:06.498
Fastest lap
- Rider: (France) Olivier Jacque
- Time: 2:07.390
Podium
- First: (Germany) Ralf Waldmann
- Second: (Germany) Jürgen Fuchs
- Third: (Italy) Max Biaggi

125cc
Pole position
- Rider: (Japan) Masaki Tokudome
- Time: 2:14.557
Fastest lap
- Rider: (Spain) Emilio Alzamora
- Time: 2:15.857
Podium
- First: (Spain) Emilio Alzamora
- Second: (Italy) Ivan Goi
- Third: (Japan) Haruchika Aoki

The 1996 Dutch TT was the seventh round of the 1996 Grand Prix motorcycle racing season. It took place on 29 June 1996 at the TT Circuit Assen located in Assen, Netherlands.

== 500 cc classification ==
Pos.	Rider	Team	Manufacturer	Time/Retired	Points
1	(Australia) Mick Doohan	Team Repsol Honda	Honda	41:29.912	25
2	(Spain) Àlex Crivillé	Team Repsol Honda	Honda	+1.496	20
3	(Brazil) Alex Barros	Honda Pileri	Honda	+17.441	16
4	(United States) Scott Russell	Lucky Strike Suzuki	Suzuki	+20.798	13
5	(United States) Kenny Roberts Jr.	Marlboro Yamaha Roberts	Yamaha	+24.376	11
6	(Japan) Norifumi Abe	Marlboro Yamaha Roberts	Yamaha	+29.090	10
7	(United Kingdom) Terry Rymer	Lucky Strike Suzuki	Suzuki	+29.919	9
8	(France) Jean-Michel Bayle	Marlboro Yamaha Roberts	Yamaha	+32.604	8
9	(Spain) Juan Borja	Elf 500 ROC	Elf 500	+38.092	7
10	(Japan) Shinichi Itoh	Team Repsol Honda	Honda	+40.536	6
11	(Spain) Carlos Checa	Fortuna Honda Pons	Honda	+40.772	5
12	(Spain) Alberto Puig	Fortuna Honda Pons	Honda	+46.100	4
13	(Japan) Tadayuki Okada	Team Repsol Honda	Honda	+48.709	3
14	(United Kingdom) Jeremy McWilliams	QUB Team Optimum	ROC Yamaha	+1:20.898	2
15	(France) Frederic Protat	Soverex FP Racing	ROC Yamaha	+1 Lap	1
Ret	(Italy) Lucio Pedercini	Team Pedercini	ROC Yamaha	Retirement	
Ret	(Italy) Loris Capirossi	Marlboro Yamaha Roberts	Yamaha	Retirement	
Ret	(Japan) Toshiyuki Arakaki	Padgett's Racing Team	Yamaha	Retirement	
Ret	(United Kingdom) James Haydon	World Championship Motorsports	ROC Yamaha	Retirement	
Ret	(Italy) Doriano Romboni	IP Aprilia Racing Team	Aprilia	Retirement	
Ret	(Switzerland) Adrien Bosshard	Elf 500 ROC	Elf 500	Retirement	
Ret	(United Kingdom) Eugene McManus	Millar Racing	Yamaha	Retirement	
Ret	(United Kingdom) Sean Emmett	Harris Grand Prix	Harris Yamaha	Retirement	
Ret	(Italy) Luca Cadalora	Kanemoto Honda	Honda	Retirement	

== 250 cc classification ==
Pos	Rider	Manufacturer	Time/Retired	Points
1	(Germany) Ralf Waldmann	Honda	38:30.306	25
2	(Germany) Jürgen Fuchs	Honda	+16.598	20
3	(Italy) Max Biaggi	Aprilia	+20.113	16
4	(Netherlands) Jurgen vd Goorbergh	Honda	+28.386	13
5	(Switzerland) Eskil Suter	Aprilia	+32.166	11
6	(Spain) Luis d'Antin	Honda	+32.417	10
7	(Japan) Nobuatsu Aoki	Honda	+34.246	9
8	(Japan) Osamu Miyazaki	Aprilia	+51.169	8
9	(United Kingdom) Jamie Robinson	Aprilia	+51.258	7
10	(Japan) Tetsuya Harada	Yamaha	+52.824	6
11	(Italy) Cristiano Migliorati	Honda	+52.884	5
12	(Italy) Luca Boscoscuro	Aprilia	+1:00.492	4
13	(Italy) Davide Bulega	Aprilia	+1:08.339	3
14	(Japan) Yasumasa Hatakeyama	Honda	+1:11.356	2
15	(Italy) Massimo Ottobre	Aprilia	+1:17.594	1
16	(France) Cristophe Cogan	Honda	+1:51.595	
17	(Netherlands) Andre Romein	Honda	+1 Lap	
18	(Netherlands) Jaap Hoogeveen	Yamaha	+1 Lap	
Ret	(Japan) Tohru Ukawa	Honda	Retirement	
Ret	(Italy) Roberto Locatelli	Aprilia	Retirement	
Ret	(Venezuela) José Barresi	Yamaha	Retirement	
Ret	(France) Christian Boudinot	Aprilia	Retirement	
Ret	(Japan) Takeshi Tsujimura	Honda	Retirement	
Ret	(Netherlands) Maurice Bolwerk	Honda	Retirement	
Ret	(Argentina) Sebastian Porto	Aprilia	Retirement	
Ret	(Spain) José Luis Cardoso	Aprilia	Retirement	
Ret	(Spain) Sete Gibernau	Honda	Retirement	
Ret	(France) Regis Laconi	Honda	Retirement	
Ret	(Italy) Gianluigi Scalvini	Honda	Retirement	
Ret	(Netherlands) Gert Pieper	Yamaha	Retirement	
Ret	(France) Olivier Jacque	Honda	Retirement	
Ret	(France) Jean-Philippe Ruggia	Honda	Retirement	
Ret	(Switzerland) Olivier Petrucciani	Aprilia	Retirement	

== 125 cc classification ==
Pos	Rider	Manufacturer	Time/Retired	Points
1	(Spain) Emilio Alzamora	Honda	39:08.050	25
2	(Italy) Ivan Goi	Honda	+0.728	20
3	(Japan) Haruchika Aoki	Honda	+0.733	16
4	(Japan) Noboru Ueda	Honda	+0.790	13
5	(Japan) Tomomi Manako	Honda	+0.846	11
6	(Germany) Dirk Raudies	Honda	+17.614	10
7	(Japan) Kazuto Sakata	Aprilia	+28.082	9
8	(Germany) Manfred Geissler	Aprilia	+31.580	8
9	(Spain) Jorge Martinez	Aprilia	+32.566	7
10	(Spain) Herri Torrontegui	Honda	+32.744	6
11	(France) Frederic Petit	Honda	+33.194	5
12	(Netherlands) Loek Bodelier	Honda	+34.812	4
13	(Italy) Stefano Perugini	Aprilia	+38.216	3
14	(Japan) Youichi Ui	Yamaha	+46.038	2
15	(Italy) Gabriele Debbia	Yamaha	+46.158	1
16	(Japan) Akira Saito	Honda	+54.148	
17	(Italy) Paolo Tessari	Honda	+1:04.150	
18	(Australia) Garry McCoy	Aprilia	+1:15.860	
19	(Netherlands) Jarno Janssen	Honda	+1:53.446	
20	(Netherlands) Gerard Rike	Honda	+2:03.347	
21	(Netherlands) Gilbert de Rover	Honda	+1 Lap	
Ret	(Netherlands) Robert Filart	Honda	Retirement	
Ret	(Italy) Lucio Cecchinello	Honda	Retirement	
Ret	(United Kingdom) Darren Barton	Aprilia	Retirement	
Ret	(Japan) Yoshiaki Katoh	Yamaha	Retirement	
Ret	(Spain) Angel Nieto Jr	Aprilia	Retirement	
Ret	(Czech Republic) Jaroslav Hules	Honda	Retirement	
Ret	(Italy) Valentino Rossi	Aprilia	Retirement	
Ret	(Japan) Masaki Tokudome	Aprilia	Retirement	
Ret	(Spain) Josep Sarda	Honda	Retirement	
Ret	(Italy) Andrea Ballerini	Aprilia	Retirement	

Previous race: 1996 French Grand Prix	FIM Grand Prix World Championship; 1996 season	Next race: 1996 German Grand Prix
Previous race: 1995 Dutch TT	Dutch TT	Next race: 1997 Dutch TT
