= 1996 Malaysian motorcycle Grand Prix =

(Malaysia) 1996 Malaysian Grand Prix
Race details
- Race 1 of 15 races in the 1996 Grand Prix motorcycle racing season
- Date: 31 March 1996
- Official name: Marlboro Grand Prix of Malaysia
- Location: Shah Alam Circuit
- Course: Permanent racing facility; 3.505 km (2.178 mi)

500cc
Pole position
- Rider: (Japan) Tadayuki Okada
- Time: 1:23.987
Fastest lap
- Rider: (Japan) Tadayuki Okada
- Time: 1:25.102
Podium
- First: (Italy) Luca Cadalora
- Second: (Brazil) Alex Barros
- Third: (Spain) Carlos Checa

250cc
Pole position
- Rider: (Italy) Max Biaggi
- Time: 1:25.795
Fastest lap
- Rider: (Italy) Max Biaggi
- Time: 1:25.994
Podium
- First: (Italy) Max Biaggi
- Second: (Japan) Tetsuya Harada
- Third: (Spain) Luis d'Antin

125cc
Pole position
- Rider: (Japan) Kazuto Sakata
- Time: 1:31.285
Fastest lap
- Rider: (Spain) Emilio Alzamora
- Time: 1:31.594
Podium
- First: (Italy) Stefano Perugini
- Second: (Japan) Haruchika Aoki
- Third: (Germany) Peter Öttl

The 1996 Malaysian motorcycle Grand Prix was the first round of the 1996 Grand Prix motorcycle racing season. It took place on 31 March 1996 at the Shah Alam Circuit. This race marked the debut of a young Italian rider and future Grand Prix motorcycle racing legend Valentino Rossi in the 125cc class.

== 500 cc classification ==
Pos.	No.	Rider	Team	Manufacturer	Laps	Time/Retired	Grid	Points
1	3	(Italy) Luca Cadalora	Kanemoto Honda	Honda	33	47:24.151	2	25
2	7	(Brazil) Alex Barros	Honda Pileri	Honda	33	+5.721	6	20
3	24	(Spain) Carlos Checa	Fortuna Honda Pons	Honda	33	+15.234	10	16
4	11	(United States) Scott Russell	Lucky Strike Suzuki	Suzuki	33	+15.393	13	13
5	1	(Australia) Mick Doohan	Team Repsol Honda	Honda	33	+26.529	3	11
6	12	(France) Jean-Michel Bayle	Marlboro Yamaha Roberts	Yamaha	33	+27.233	9	10
7	17	(Spain) Alberto Puig	Fortuna Honda Pons	Honda	33	+47.603	12	9
8	9	(Japan) Norifumi Abe	Marlboro Yamaha Roberts	Yamaha	33	+48.555	7	8
9	27	(France) Frédéric Protat	Soverex FP Racing	ROC Yamaha	33	+1:26.583	14	7
10	8	(Spain) Juan Borja	Elf 500 ROC	ELF 500	33	+1:27.515	15	6
11	19	(United Kingdom) Sean Emmett	Harris Grand Prix	Harris Yamaha	33	+1:45.301	21	5
12	22	(Italy) Lucio Pedercini	Team Pedercini	ROC Yamaha	33	+1:58.577	18	4
13	16	(Belgium) Laurent Naveau	ELC Lease ROC	ROC Yamaha	33	+2:03.135	23	3
14	13	(United Kingdom) Jeremy McWilliams	QUB Team Optimum	ROC Yamaha	33	+2:13.518	20	2
15	18	(United Kingdom) James Haydon	World Championship Motorsports	ROC Yamaha	32	+1 Lap	16	1
16	51	(France) Jean-Pierre Jeandat	Team Paton	Paton	32	+1 Lap	22	
17	20	(Japan) Toshiyuki Arakaki	Padgett's Racing Team	Yamaha	31	+2 Laps	19	
Ret	23	(United Kingdom) Eugene McManus	Millar Racing	Yamaha	19	Retirement	25	
Ret	41	(Japan) Shinichi Ito	Team Repsol Honda	Honda	18	Retirement	11	
Ret	6	(Japan) Tadayuki Okada	Team Repsol Honda	Honda	11	Retirement	1	
Ret	65	(Italy) Loris Capirossi	Marlboro Yamaha Roberts	Yamaha	9	Retirement	5	
Ret	14	(Switzerland) Adrian Bosshard	Elf 500 ROC	ELF 500	7	Retirement	24	
Ret	4	(Spain) Àlex Crivillé	Team Repsol Honda	Honda	2	Retirement	4	
DNS	15	(Italy) Doriano Romboni	IP Aprilia Racing Team	Aprilia			8	
DNS	21	(Japan) Katsuaki Fujiwara	Lucky Strike Suzuki	Suzuki			17	

== 250 cc classification ==
Pos	No.	Rider	Manufacturer	Laps	Time/Retired	Grid	Points
1	1	(Italy) Max Biaggi	Aprilia	31	45:06.934	1	25
2	31	(Japan) Tetsuya Harada	Yamaha	31	+14.745	2	20
3	7	(Spain) Luis d'Antin	Honda	31	+33.058	6	16
4	19	(France) Olivier Jacque	Honda	31	+37.121	3	13
5	5	(France) Jean-Philippe Ruggia	Honda	31	+39.478	4	11
6	6	(Japan) Nobuatsu Aoki	Honda	31	+49.988	5	10
7	11	(Germany) Jürgen Fuchs	Honda	31	+56.860	7	9
8	12	(Netherlands) Jurgen vd Goorbergh	Honda	31	+1:06.596	9	8
9	20	(Italy) Luca Boscoscuro	Aprilia	31	+1:15.716	15	7
10	18	(Italy) Roberto Locatelli	Aprilia	31	+1:20.972	14	6
11	41	(United Kingdom) Jamie Robinson	Aprilia	31	+1:23.754	10	5
12	26	(Japan) Takeshi Tsujimura	Honda	31	+1:29.408	17	4
13	8	(Italy) Cristiano Migliorati	Honda	30	+1 Lap	16	3
14	25	(Italy) Davide Bulega	Aprilia	30	+1 Lap	24	2
15	29	(Japan) Osamu Miyazaki	Aprilia	30	+1 Lap	23	1
16	57	(Malaysia) Shahrol Yuzy	Yamaha	30	+1 Lap	26	
17	58	(Malaysia) Shahrun Nizam	Yamaha	30	+1 Lap	31	
Ret	28	(France) Christophe Cogan	Honda	27	Retirement	21	
Ret	14	(Switzerland) Eskil Suter	Aprilia	17	Retirement	11	
Ret	55	(France) Régis Laconi	Honda	16	Retirement	18	
Ret	27	(Argentina) Sebastián Porto	Aprilia	13	Retirement	12	
Ret	23	(France) Christian Boudinot	Aprilia	13	Retirement	27	
Ret	9	(Japan) Yasumasa Hatakeyama	Honda	13	Retirement	13	
Ret	21	(Italy) Massimo Ottobre	Aprilia	9	Retirement	29	
Ret	96	(Venezuela) José Barresi	Yamaha	8	Retirement	28	
Ret	15	(Italy) Gianluigi Scalvini	Honda	6	Retirement	22	
Ret	16	(Spain) Sete Gibernau	Honda	4	Retirement	30	
Ret	30	(Spain) José Luis Cardoso	Aprilia	4	Retirement	19	
Ret	56	(Malaysia) Meng Heng Kuang	Yamaha	2	Retirement	25	
Ret	10	(Japan) Tohru Ukawa	Honda	2	Retirement	8	
Ret	22	(Switzerland) Oliver Petrucciani	Aprilia	2	Retirement	20	
DNS	3	(Germany) Ralf Waldmann	Honda			32	

== 125 cc classification ==
Pos	No.	Rider	Manufacturer	Laps	Time/Retired	Grid	Points
1	6	(Italy) Stefano Perugini	Aprilia	29	44:46.542	4	25
2	1	(Japan) Haruchika Aoki	Honda	29	+0.405	7	20
3	10	(Germany) Peter Öttl	Aprilia	29	+0.758	10	16
4	7	(Japan) Masaki Tokudome	Aprilia	29	+0.785	9	13
5	3	(Spain) Emilio Alzamora	Honda	29	+1.267	3	11
6	46	(Italy) Valentino Rossi	Aprilia	29	+7.379	13	10
7	8	(Japan) Tomomi Manako	Honda	29	+7.406	5	9
8	4	(Japan) Akira Saito	Honda	29	+7.814	11	8
9	12	(Japan) Noboru Ueda	Honda	29	+18.034	14	7
10	2	(Japan) Kazuto Sakata	Aprilia	29	+35.742	1	6
11	23	(France) Frédéric Petit	Honda	29	+39.738	28	5
12	72	(Australia) Garry McCoy	Aprilia	29	+39.812	18	4
13	21	(Italy) Andrea Ballerini	Aprilia	29	+57.770	19	3
14	24	(Czech Republic) Jaroslav Huleš	Honda	29	+1:10.237	17	2
15	37	(Italy) Paolo Tessari	Honda	29	+1:10.772	22	1
16	26	(Italy) Ivan Goi	Honda	29	+1:12.419	26	
17	30	(Italy) Stefano Cruciani	Aprilia	29	+1:34.951	25	
18	35	(Netherlands) Loek Bodelier	Honda	28	+1 Lap	21	
19	36	(Spain) Josep Sardá	Honda	28	+1 Lap	27	
20	59	(Malaysia) Yau Chuen Tang	Yamaha	27	+2 Laps	33	
Ret	5	(Germany) Dirk Raudies	Honda	17	Retirement	2	
Ret	88	(Spain) Ángel Nieto, Jr.	Aprilia	16	Retirement	29	
Ret	57	(Malaysia) Yasir Said	Yamaha	14	Retirement	31	
Ret	15	(Germany) Manfred Geissler	Aprilia	12	Retirement	12	
Ret	14	(Japan) Yoshiaki Katoh	Yamaha	9	Retirement	8	
Ret	19	(Japan) Youichi Ui	Yamaha	8	Retirement	23	
Ret	58	(Malaysia) Chow Yan Kit	Yamaha	8	Retirement	32	
Ret	13	(Italy) Lucio Cecchinello	Honda	7	Retirement	16	
Ret	99	(Malaysia) Chao Chee Hou	Yamaha	6	Retirement	30	
Ret	27	(Italy) Gabriele Debbia	Yamaha	6	Retirement	15	
Ret	55	(Spain) Jorge Martínez	Aprilia	3	Retirement	6	
Ret	17	(United Kingdom) Darren Barton	Aprilia	3	Retirement	24	
Ret	25	(Spain) José David de Gea	Honda	0	Retirement	20	

Previous race: 1995 European Grand Prix	FIM Grand Prix World Championship; 1996 season	Next race: 1996 Indonesian Grand Prix
Previous race: 1995 Malaysian Grand Prix	Malaysian Grand Prix	Next race: 1997 Malaysian Grand Prix
