= 1996 German motorcycle Grand Prix =

(Germany) 1996 German Grand Prix
Race details
- Race 8 of 15 races in the 1996 Grand Prix motorcycle racing season
- Date: 7 July 1996
- Official name: Warsteiner Grand Prix Deutschland
- Location: Nürburgring
- Course: Permanent racing facility; 4.556 km (2.831 mi)

500cc
Pole position
- Rider: (Spain) Àlex Crivillé
- Time: 1:40.347
Fastest lap
- Rider: (Australia) Mick Doohan
- Time: 1:40.219
Podium
- First: (Italy) Luca Cadalora
- Second: (Australia) Mick Doohan
- Third: (Spain) Àlex Crivillé

250cc
Pole position
- Rider: (Germany) Ralf Waldmann
- Time: 1:43.902
Fastest lap
- Rider: (Germany) Ralf Waldmann
- Time: 1:42.991
Podium
- First: (Germany) Ralf Waldmann
- Second: (France) Olivier Jacque
- Third: (Germany) Jürgen Fuchs

125cc
Pole position
- Rider: (Spain) Jorge Martínez
- Time: 1:49.894
Fastest lap
- Rider: (Germany) Peter Öttl
- Time: 1:48.383
Podium
- First: (Japan) Masaki Tokudome
- Second: (Italy) Stefano Perugini
- Third: (Japan) Haruchika Aoki

The 1996 German motorcycle Grand Prix was the eighth round of the 1996 Grand Prix motorcycle racing season. It took place on 7 July 1996 at the Nürburgring.

== 500 cc classification ==
Pos.	Rider	Team	Manufacturer	Time/Retired	Points
1	(Italy) Luca Cadalora	Kanemoto Honda	Honda	45:35.889	25
2	(Australia) Mick Doohan	Team Repsol Honda	Honda	+0.210	20
3	(Spain) Àlex Crivillé	Team Repsol Honda	Honda	+0.657	16
4	(United States) Scott Russell	Lucky Strike Suzuki	Suzuki	+4.916	13
5	(United States) Kenny Roberts Jr.	Marlboro Yamaha Roberts	Yamaha	+7.703	11
6	(Japan) Norifumi Abe	Marlboro Yamaha Roberts	Yamaha	+13.448	10
7	(Japan) Tadayuki Okada	Team Repsol Honda	Honda	+14.060	9
8	(Brazil) Alex Barros	Honda Pileri	Honda	+17.680	8
9	(Japan) Shinichi Itoh	Team Repsol Honda	Honda	+34.806	7
10	(France) Jean-Michel Bayle	Marlboro Yamaha Roberts	Yamaha	+43.311	6
11	(Spain) Alberto Puig	Fortuna Honda Pons	Honda	+55.589	5
12	(Italy) Loris Capirossi	Marlboro Yamaha Roberts	Yamaha	+59.707	4
13	(Italy) Lucio Pedercini	Team Pedercini	ROC Yamaha	+1:31.799	3
14	(France) Frederic Protat	Soverex FP Racing	ROC Yamaha	+2 Laps	2
15	(United Kingdom) Eugene McManus	Millar Racing	Yamaha	+2 Laps	1
16	(France) Florian Ferracci	Soverex FP Racing	Paton	+2 Laps	
17	(Switzerland) Nicholas Schmassman	Team Schmassman	Yamaha	+2 Laps	
Ret	(United Kingdom) Terry Rymer	Lucky Strike Suzuki	Suzuki	Retirement	
Ret	(Spain) Carlos Checa	Fortuna Honda Pons	Honda	Retirement	
Ret	(United Kingdom) Jeremy McWilliams	QUB Team Optimum	ROC Yamaha	Retirement	
Ret	(Spain) Juan Borja	Elf 500 ROC	Elf 500	Retirement	
Ret	(Switzerland) Adrien Bosshard	Elf 500 ROC	Elf 500	Retirement	
Ret	(Italy) Doriano Romboni	IP Aprilia Racing Team	Aprilia	Retirement	
Ret	(United Kingdom) Sean Emmett	Harris Grand Prix	Harris Yamaha	Retirement	
Ret	(Belgium) Laurent Naveau	ELC Lease ROC	ROC Yamaha	Retirement	
Ret	(Germany) Michael Rudroff	Suzuki Deutschland	Suzuki	Retirement	

== 250 cc classification ==
Pos	Rider	Manufacturer	Time/Retired	Points
1	(Germany) Ralf Waldmann	Honda	43:16.908	25
2	(France) Olivier Jacque	Honda	+2.022	20
3	(Germany) Jürgen Fuchs	Honda	+3.434	16
4	(Italy) Max Biaggi	Aprilia	+3.860	13
5	(Spain) Luis d'Antin	Honda	+27.378	11
6	(Italy) Luca Boscoscuro	Aprilia	+27.816	10
7	(France) Jean-Philippe Ruggia	Honda	+28.112	9
8	(France) Regis Laconi	Honda	+33.926	8
9	(Italy) Cristiano Migliorati	Honda	+34.321	7
10	(Japan) Tohru Ukawa	Honda	+35.421	6
11	(Japan) Nobuatsu Aoki	Honda	+41.997	5
12	(Japan) Osamu Miyazaki	Aprilia	+52.820	4
13	(Switzerland) Eskil Suter	Aprilia	+59.816	3
14	(Switzerland) Olivier Petrucciani	Aprilia	+1:08.714	2
15	(Japan) Yasumasa Hatakeyama	Honda	+1:11.238	1
16	(France) Christian Boudinot	Aprilia	+1:12.677	
17	(France) Cristophe Cogan	Honda	+1:15.676	
18	(Italy) Davide Bulega	Aprilia	+1:21.112	
19	(Spain) Sete Gibernau	Honda	+1:34.137	
20	(Argentina) Sebastian Porto	Aprilia	+1:44.834	
Ret	(Germany) Jurgen Lingg	Honda	Retirement	
Ret	(Italy) Alessandro Antonello	Aprilia	Retirement	
Ret	(Japan) Takeshi Tsujimura	Honda	Retirement	
Ret	(United Kingdom) Jamie Robinson	Aprilia	Retirement	
Ret	(Netherlands) Jurgen vd Goorbergh	Honda	Retirement	
Ret	(Venezuela) José Barresi	Yamaha	Retirement	
Ret	(Italy) Marcellino Lucchi	Aprilia	Retirement	
Ret	(Germany) Alexander Folger	Aprilia	Retirement	
Ret	(Italy) Gianluigi Scalvini	Honda	Retirement	
Ret	(Germany) Michael Schulten	Aprilia	Retirement	
Ret	(Germany) Matthias Neukirchen	Yamaha	Retirement	
Ret	(Japan) Tetsuya Harada	Yamaha	Retirement	

== 125 cc classification ==
Pos	Rider	Manufacturer	Time/Retired	Points
1	(Japan) Masaki Tokudome	Aprilia	42:14.721	25
2	(Italy) Stefano Perugini	Aprilia	+0.317	20
3	(Japan) Haruchika Aoki	Honda	+0.933	16
4	(Spain) Emilio Alzamora	Honda	+1.691	13
5	(Italy) Valentino Rossi	Aprilia	+1.919	11
6	(Germany) Peter Öttl	Aprilia	+2.067	10
7	(Spain) Jorge Martinez	Aprilia	+3.971	9
8	(Japan) Tomomi Manako	Honda	+4.509	8
9	(Germany) Manfred Geissler	Aprilia	+13.739	7
10	(Italy) Ivan Goi	Honda	+14.319	6
11	(Japan) Kazuto Sakata	Aprilia	+14.792	5
12	(Japan) Noboru Ueda	Honda	+14.914	4
13	(Spain) Josep Sarda	Honda	+15.917	3
14	(Italy) Lucio Cecchinello	Honda	+16.773	2
15	(France) Frederic Petit	Honda	+18.049	1
16	(Germany) Dirk Raudies	Honda	+23.732	
17	(Czech Republic) Jaroslav Hules	Honda	+25.574	
18	(Japan) Yoshiaki Katoh	Yamaha	+26.147	
19	(Japan) Akira Saito	Honda	+1:04.869	
20	(Italy) Paolo Tessari	Honda	+1:05.242	
21	(Spain) Herri Torrontegui	Honda	+1:05.311	
22	(Spain) Angel Nieto Jr	Aprilia	+1:14.357	
23	(Germany) Markus Ober	Honda	+1 Lap	
Ret	(Germany) Emanuel Buchner	Aprilia	Retirement	
Ret	(United Kingdom) Darren Barton	Aprilia	Retirement	
Ret	(Germany) Christian Kellner	Honda	Retirement	
Ret	(Australia) Garry McCoy	Aprilia	Retirement	
Ret	(Japan) Youichi Ui	Yamaha	Retirement	
Ret	(Netherlands) Loek Bodelier	Honda	Retirement	
Ret	(Italy) Andrea Ballerini	Aprilia	Retirement	
Ret	(Italy) Gabriele Debbia	Yamaha	Retirement	
Ret	(Germany) Steve Jenkner	Aprilia	Retirement	

Previous race: 1996 Dutch TT	FIM Grand Prix World Championship; 1996 season	Next race: 1996 British Grand Prix
Previous race: 1995 German Grand Prix	German Grand Prix	Next race: 1997 German Grand Prix
