= 1996 Indonesian motorcycle Grand Prix =

(Indonesia) 1996 Indonesian Grand Prix
Race details
- Race 2 of 15 races in the 1996 Grand Prix motorcycle racing season
- Date: 7 April 1996
- Official name: Marlboro Indonesian Grand Prix
- Location: Sentul International Circuit
- Course: Permanent racing facility; 3.965 km (2.464 mi)

500cc
Pole position
Rider	(Australia) Mick Doohan	Honda
Time	1:26.883	
Fastest lap
Rider	(Australia) Mick Doohan	Honda
Time	1:27.139 on lap 27	
Podium
First	(Australia) Mick Doohan	Honda
Second	(Brazil) Alex Barros	Honda
Third	(Italy) Loris Capirossi	Yamaha

250cc
Pole position
Rider	(Japan) Tetsuya Harada	Yamaha
Time	1:29.257	
Fastest lap
Rider	(Japan) Tetsuya Harada	Yamaha
Time	1:29.696 on lap 28	
Podium
First	(Japan) Tetsuya Harada	Yamaha
Second	(Italy) Max Biaggi	Aprilia
Third	(Germany) Ralf Waldmann	Honda

125cc
Pole position
Rider	(Japan) Haruchika Aoki	Honda
Time	1:35.138	
Fastest lap
Rider	(Japan) Haruchika Aoki	Honda
Time	1:35.068 on lap 7	
Podium
First	(Japan) Masaki Tokudome	Aprilia
Second	(Japan) Haruchika Aoki	Honda
Third	(Germany) Peter Öttl	Aprilia

The 1996 Indonesian motorcycle Grand Prix was the second round of the 1996 Grand Prix motorcycle racing season. It took place on 7 April 1996 at the Sentul International Circuit.

== 500 cc classification ==
Pos.	No.	Rider	Team	Manufacturer	Laps	Time/Retired	Grid	Points
1	1	(Australia) Mick Doohan	Team Repsol Honda	Honda	30	43:50.798	1	25
2	7	(Brazil) Alex Barros	Honda Pileri	Honda	30	+3.227	6	20
3	65	(Italy) Loris Capirossi	Marlboro Yamaha Roberts	Yamaha	30	+6.792	2	16
4	4	(Spain) Àlex Crivillé	Team Repsol Honda	Honda	30	+7.428	9	13
5	24	(Spain) Carlos Checa	Fortuna Honda Pons	Honda	30	+10.638	4	11
6	3	(Italy) Luca Cadalora	Kanemoto Honda	Honda	30	+23.768	5	10
7	11	(United States) Scott Russell	Lucky Strike Suzuki	Suzuki	30	+30.754	11	9
8	12	(France) Jean-Michel Bayle	Marlboro Yamaha Roberts	Yamaha	30	+33.081	7	8
9	9	(Japan) Norifumi Abe	Marlboro Yamaha Roberts	Yamaha	30	+37.094	13	7
10	17	(Spain) Alberto Puig	Fortuna Honda Pons	Honda	30	+37.135	8	6
11	15	(Italy) Doriano Romboni	IP Aprilia Racing Team	Aprilia	30	+1:03.934	10	5
12	13	(United Kingdom) Jeremy McWilliams	QUB Team Optimum	ROC Yamaha	30	+1:07.139	15	4
13	41	(Japan) Shinichi Itoh	Team Repsol Honda	Honda	30	+1:08.088	12	3
14	27	(France) Frédéric Protat	Soverex FP Racing	ROC Yamaha	29	+1 lap	18	2
15	19	(United Kingdom) Sean Emmett	Harris Grand Prix	Harris Yamaha	29	+1 lap	21	1
16	16	(Belgium) Laurent Naveau	ELC Lease ROC	ROC Yamaha	29	+1 lap	17	
17	20	(Japan) Toshiyuki Arakaki	Padgett's Racing Team	Yamaha	29	+1 lap	16	
18	18	(United Kingdom) James Haydon	World Championship Motorsports	ROC Yamaha	29	+1 lap	19	
Ret	14	(Switzerland) Adrian Bosshard	Elf 500 ROC	ELF 500	21	Retirement	23	
Ret	8	(Spain) Juan Borja	Elf 500 ROC	ELF 500	18	Retirement	14	
Ret	22	(Italy) Lucio Pedercini	Team Pedercini	ROC Yamaha	18	Retirement	22	
Ret	6	(Japan) Tadayuki Okada	Team Repsol Honda	Honda	3	Retirement	3	
Ret	23	(United Kingdom) Eugene McManus	Millar Racing	Yamaha	3	Retirement	20	
DNS	51	(France) Jean-Pierre Jeandat	Team Paton	Paton		Did not start	24	

== 250 cc classification ==
Pos.	No.	Rider	Manufacturer	Laps	Time/Retired	Grid	Points
1	31	(Japan) Tetsuya Harada	Yamaha	28	42:13.486	1	25
2	1	(Italy) Max Biaggi	Aprilia	28	+1.809	2	20
3	3	(Germany) Ralf Waldmann	Honda	28	+12.658	3	16
4	7	(Spain) Luis d'Antin	Honda	28	+22.728	7	13
5	6	(Japan) Nobuatsu Aoki	Honda	28	+22.772	4	11
6	11	(Germany) Jürgen Fuchs	Honda	28	+24.407	5	10
7	10	(Japan) Tohru Ukawa	Honda	28	+24.410	8	9
8	19	(France) Olivier Jacque	Honda	28	+31.935	6	8
9	27	(Argentina) Sebastián Porto	Aprilia	28	+36.964	11	7
10	5	(France) Jean-Philippe Ruggia	Honda	28	+39.456	9	6
11	14	(Switzerland) Eskil Suter	Aprilia	28	+53.758	10	5
12	12	(Netherlands) Jurgen vd Goorbergh	Honda	28	+1:02.343	13	4
13	20	(Italy) Luca Boscoscuro	Aprilia	28	+1:05.358	20	3
14	25	(Italy) Davide Bulega	Aprilia	28	+1:05.654	19	2
15	9	(Japan) Yasumasa Hatakeyama	Honda	28	+1:16.014	16	1
16	55	(France) Régis Laconi	Honda	28	+1:26.536	28	
17	16	(Spain) Sete Gibernau	Honda	28	+1:30.048	21	
18	15	(Italy) Gianluigi Scalvini	Honda	27	+1 lap	25	
19	22	(Switzerland) Oliver Petrucciani	Aprilia	27	+1 lap	18	
20	28	(France) Christophe Cogan	Honda	27	+1 lap	27	
Ret	29	(Japan) Osamu Miyazaki	Aprilia	20	Retirement	17	
Ret	21	(Italy) Massimo Ottobre	Aprilia	15	Retirement	12	
Ret	41	(United Kingdom) Jamie Robinson	Aprilia	11	Retirement	15	
Ret	8	(Italy) Cristiano Migliorati	Honda	6	Retirement	23	
Ret	23	(France) Christian Boudinot	Aprilia	5	Retirement	24	
Ret	18	(Italy) Roberto Locatelli	Aprilia	3	Retirement	14	
Ret	26	(Japan) Takeshi Tsujimura	Honda	1	Retirement	22	
Ret	96	(Venezuela) José Barresi	Yamaha	1	Retirement	29	
Ret	30	(Spain) José Luis Cardoso	Aprilia	1	Retirement	26	

== 125 cc classification ==
Pos.	No.	Rider	Manufacturer	Laps	Time/Retired	Grid	Points
1	7	(Japan) Masaki Tokudome	Aprilia	26	41:38.797	3	25
2	1	(Japan) Haruchika Aoki	Honda	26	+0.099	1	20
3	10	(Germany) Peter Öttl	Aprilia	26	+7.359	2	16
4	5	(Germany) Dirk Raudies	Honda	26	+19.491	4	13
5	55	(Spain) Jorge Martínez	Aprilia	26	+22.321	8	11
6	12	(Japan) Noboru Ueda	Honda	26	+24.197	7	10
7	8	(Japan) Tomomi Manako	Honda	26	+24.325	5	9
8	6	(Italy) Stefano Perugini	Aprilia	26	+31.260	6	8
9	4	(Japan) Akira Saito	Honda	26	+33.357	11	7
10	21	(Italy) Andrea Ballerini	Aprilia	26	+33.799	12	6
11	46	(Italy) Valentino Rossi	Aprilia	26	+34.140	18	5
12	13	(Italy) Lucio Cecchinello	Honda	26	+41.543	14	4
13	26	(Italy) Ivan Goi	Honda	26	+41.706	23	3
14	2	(Japan) Kazuto Sakata	Aprilia	26	+51.169	21	2
15	23	(France) Frédéric Petit	Honda	26	+51.445	16	1
16	17	(United Kingdom) Darren Barton	Aprilia	26	+55.425	24	
17	24	(Czech Republic) Jaroslav Huleš	Honda	26	+59.542	15	
18	37	(Italy) Paolo Tessari	Honda	26	+1:00.279	22	
19	36	(Spain) Josep Sardá	Honda	26	+1:07.873	25	
20	61	(Indonesia) Petrus Canisius	Yamaha	25	+1 lap	31	
21	60	(Indonesia) Ahmad Jayadi	Yamaha	25	+1 lap	30	
Ret	15	(Germany) Manfred Geissler	Aprilia	24	Retirement	10	
Ret	27	(Italy) Gabriele Debbia	Yamaha	17	Retirement	19	
Ret	72	(Australia) Garry McCoy	Aprilia	16	Retirement	9	
Ret	3	(Spain) Emilio Alzamora	Honda	13	Retirement	13	
Ret	35	(Netherlands) Loek Bodelier	Honda	11	Retirement	28	
Ret	88	(Spain) Ángel Nieto, Jr.	Aprilia	6	Retirement	29	
Ret	25	(Spain) José David de Gea	Honda	6	Retirement	20	
Ret	14	(Japan) Yoshiaki Katoh	Yamaha	3	Retirement	17	
Ret	30	(Italy) Stefano Cruciani	Aprilia	3	Retirement	26	
Ret	41	(Spain) José Ramón Ramírez	Yamaha	3	Retirement	27	

Previous race: 1996 Malaysian Grand Prix	FIM Grand Prix World Championship; 1996 season	Next race: 1996 Japanese Grand Prix
Previous race: None	Indonesian Grand Prix	Next race: 1997 Indonesian Grand Prix
