= 1996 French motorcycle Grand Prix =

(France) 1996 French Grand Prix
Race details
- Race 6 of 15 races in the 1996 Grand Prix motorcycle racing season
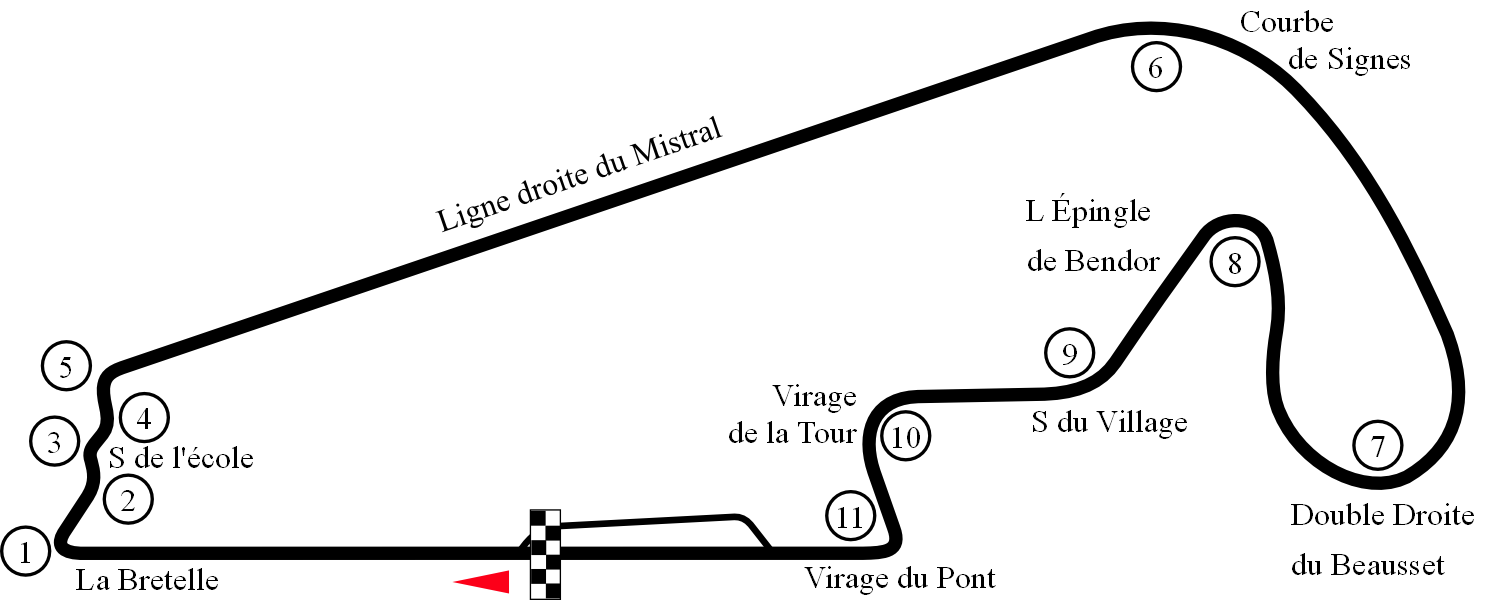
- Date: 9 June 1996
- Official name: Grand Prix de France
- Location: Le Castellet
- Course: Permanent racing facility; 3.800 km (2.361 mi)

500cc
Pole position
- Rider: (Spain) Àlex Crivillé
- Time: 1:21.448
Fastest lap
- Rider: (Spain) Àlex Crivillé
- Time: 1:22.022
Podium
- First: (Australia) Mick Doohan
- Second: (Spain) Àlex Crivillé
- Third: (Spain) Alberto Puig

250cc
Pole position
- Rider: (Italy) Max Biaggi
- Time: 1:23.378
Fastest lap
- Rider: (Italy) Max Biaggi
- Time: 1:24.189
Podium
- First: (Italy) Max Biaggi
- Second: (Germany) Ralf Waldmann
- Third: (Japan) Tetsuya Harada

125cc
Pole position
- Rider: (Japan) Masaki Tokudome
- Time: 1:29.351
Fastest lap
- Rider: (Italy) Valentino Rossi
- Time: 1:29.263
Podium
- First: (Italy) Stefano Perugini
- Second: (Japan) Tomomi Manako
- Third: (Spain) Emilio Alzamora

The 1996 French motorcycle Grand Prix was the sixth round of the 1996 Grand Prix motorcycle racing season. It took place on 9 June 1996 at Circuit Paul Ricard.

== 500 cc classification ==
Pos.	Rider	Team	Manufacturer	Time/Retired	Points
1	(Australia) Mick Doohan	Team Repsol Honda	Honda	42:43.959	25
2	(Spain) Àlex Crivillé	Team Repsol Honda	Honda	+11.539	20
3	(Spain) Alberto Puig	Fortuna Honda Pons	Honda	+26.255	16
4	(Japan) Norifumi Abe	Marlboro Yamaha Roberts	Yamaha	+26.467	13
5	(United States) Scott Russell	Lucky Strike Suzuki	Suzuki	+29.739	11
6	(Italy) Luca Cadalora	Kanemoto Honda	Honda	+40.379	10
7	(Brazil) Alex Barros	Honda Pileri	Honda	+58.435	9
8	(France) Frederic Protat	Soverex FP Racing	ROC Yamaha	+1:14.962	8
9	(United Kingdom) James Haydon	World Championship Motorsports	ROC Yamaha	+1:19.042	7
10	(Italy) Lucio Pedercini	Team Pedercini	ROC Yamaha	+1 Lap	6
11	(United Kingdom) Jeremy McWilliams	QUB Team Optimum	ROC Yamaha	+1 Lap	5
12	(United Kingdom) Eugene McManus	Millar Racing	Yamaha	+1 Lap	4
13	(France) Florian Ferracci	Soverex FP Racing	ROC Yamaha	+1 Lap	3
14	(France) Jean-Marc Deletang	ELC Lease ROC	ROC Yamaha	+1 Lap	2
15	(Japan) Toshiyuki Arakaki	Padgett's Racing Team	Yamaha	+1 Lap	1
Ret	(Italy) Doriano Romboni	IP Aprilia Racing Team	Aprilia	Retirement	
Ret	(Japan) Tadayuki Okada	Team Repsol Honda	Honda	Retirement	
Ret	(United States) Kenny Roberts Jr.	Marlboro Yamaha Roberts	Yamaha	Retirement	
Ret	(United Kingdom) Sean Emmett	Harris Grand Prix	Harris Yamaha	Retirement	
Ret	(Spain) Juan Borja	Elf 500 ROC	Elf 500	Retirement	
Ret	(Japan) Shinichi Itoh	Team Repsol Honda	Honda	Retirement	
Ret	(Spain) Carlos Checa	Fortuna Honda Pons	Honda	Retirement	
Ret	(France) Jean-Michel Bayle	Marlboro Yamaha Roberts	Yamaha	Retirement	
Ret	(France) Jean Pierre Jeandat	Team Paton	Paton	Retirement	
Ret	(Italy) Loris Capirossi	Marlboro Yamaha Roberts	Yamaha	Retirement	

== 250 cc classification ==
Pos	Rider	Manufacturer	Time/Retired	Points
1	(Italy) Max Biaggi	Aprilia	41:06.274	25
2	(Germany) Ralf Waldmann	Honda	+6.894	20
3	(Japan) Tetsuya Harada	Yamaha	+27.160	16
4	(Japan) Tohru Ukawa	Honda	+36.462	13
5	(Japan) Nobuatsu Aoki	Honda	+36.564	11
6	(Italy) Luca Boscoscuro	Aprilia	+36.650	10
7	(Switzerland) Eskil Suter	Aprilia	+38.284	9
8	(Italy) Roberto Locatelli	Aprilia	+38.440	8
9	(Italy) Cristiano Migliorati	Honda	+39.173	7
10	(Spain) Luis d'Antin	Honda	+39.434	6
11	(France) Regis Laconi	Honda	+51.144	5
12	(Netherlands) Jurgen vd Goorbergh	Honda	+52.228	4
13	(Japan) Takeshi Tsujimura	Honda	+52.726	3
14	(Japan) Yasumasa Hatakeyama	Honda	+54.385	2
15	(Switzerland) Olivier Petrucciani	Aprilia	+54.506	1
16	(Argentina) Sebastian Porto	Aprilia	+54.708	
17	(Italy) Davide Bulega	Aprilia	+54.932	
18	(Italy) Massimo Ottobre	Aprilia	+1:04.710	
19	(Italy) Gianluigi Scalvini	Honda	+1 Lap	
20	(France) Sebastien Gimbert	Honda	+1 Lap	
21	(France) Cristophe Cogan	Honda	+1 Lap	
22	(France) Gilles Ferstler	Honda	+1 Lap	
Ret	(Germany) Jürgen Fuchs	Honda	Retirement	
Ret	(France) Olivier Jacque	Honda	Retirement	
Ret	(Spain) José Luis Cardoso	Aprilia	Retirement	
Ret	(Japan) Osamu Miyazaki	Aprilia	Retirement	
Ret	(France) Jean-Philippe Ruggia	Honda	Retirement	
Ret	(Venezuela) José Barresi	Yamaha	Retirement	
Ret	(United Kingdom) Jamie Robinson	Aprilia	Retirement	
Ret	(France) Christian Boudinot	Aprilia	Retirement	
Ret	(Spain) Sete Gibernau	Honda	Retirement	

== 125 cc classification ==
Pos	Rider	Manufacturer	Time/Retired	Points
1	(Italy) Stefano Perugini	Aprilia	40:44.539	25
2	(Japan) Tomomi Manako	Honda	+0.373	20
3	(Spain) Emilio Alzamora	Honda	+0.672	16
4	(Japan) Noboru Ueda	Honda	+0.708	13
5	(Japan) Yoshiaki Katoh	Yamaha	+0.929	11
6	(Germany) Dirk Raudies	Honda	+2.926	10
7	(Japan) Haruchika Aoki	Honda	+3.261	9
8	(Japan) Kazuto Sakata	Aprilia	+4.598	8
9	(Australia) Garry McCoy	Aprilia	+14.243	7
10	(Japan) Akira Saito	Honda	+14.489	6
11	(Germany) Manfred Geissler	Aprilia	+14.579	5
12	(Italy) Ivan Goi	Honda	+18.898	4
13	(France) Frederic Petit	Honda	+23.947	3
14	(Spain) Herri Torrontegui	Honda	+28.271	2
15	(Japan) Youichi Ui	Yamaha	+48.262	1
16	(Italy) Paolo Tessari	Honda	+48.529	
17	(Netherlands) Loek Bodelier	Honda	+48.889	
18	(Italy) Gabriele Debbia	Yamaha	+49.239	
19	(France) Bertrand Stey	Honda	+1:00.037	
20	(Spain) Angel Nieto Jr	Aprilia	+1:12.258	
21	(France) Gregory Fouet	Honda	+1 Lap	
Ret	(United Kingdom) Darren Barton	Aprilia	Retirement	
Ret	(France) Arnaud Vincent	Aprilia	Retirement	
Ret	(Czech Republic) Jaroslav Hules	Honda	Retirement	
Ret	(Japan) Masaki Tokudome	Aprilia	Retirement	
Ret	(Italy) Valentino Rossi	Aprilia	Retirement	
Ret	(Spain) Josep Sarda	Honda	Retirement	
Ret	(Italy) Andrea Ballerini	Aprilia	Retirement	
Ret	(France) Eric Mizera	Aprilia	Retirement	
Ret	(Italy) Lucio Cecchinello	Honda	Retirement	
Ret	(Germany) Peter Öttl	Aprilia	Retirement	
Ret	(Spain) Jorge Martinez	Aprilia	Retirement	

Previous race: 1996 Italian Grand Prix	FIM Grand Prix World Championship; 1996 season	Next race: 1996 Dutch TT
Previous race: 1995 French Grand Prix	French Grand Prix	Next race: 1997 French Grand Prix
