= 1996 Czech Republic motorcycle Grand Prix =

1996 Czech Republic Grand Prix
Race details
- Race 11 of 15 races in the 1996 Grand Prix motorcycle racing season
- Date: 18 August 1996
- Official name: Grand Prix České Republiky
- Location: Brno Circuit
- Course: Permanent racing facility; 5.403 km (3.357 mi)

500cc
Pole position
- Rider: (France) Jean-Michel Bayle
- Time: 2:02.834
Fastest lap
- Rider: (Spain) Àlex Crivillé
- Time: 2:02.791
Podium
- First: (Spain) Àlex Crivillé
- Second: (Australia) Mick Doohan
- Third: (United States) Scott Russell

250cc
Pole position
- Rider: (Italy) Max Biaggi
- Time: 2:04.626
Fastest lap
- Rider: (Italy) Max Biaggi
- Time: 2:06.067
Podium
- First: (Italy) Max Biaggi
- Second: (France) Olivier Jacque
- Third: (Germany) Ralf Waldmann

125cc
Pole position
- Rider: (Italy) Valentino Rossi
- Time: 2:11.140
Fastest lap
- Rider: (Spain) Jorge Martínez
- Time: 2:11.816
Podium
- First: (Italy) Valentino Rossi
- Second: (Spain) Jorge Martínez
- Third: (Japan) Tomomi Manako

The 1996 Czech Republic motorcycle Grand Prix was the eleventh round of the 1996 Grand Prix motorcycle racing season. It took place on 18 August 1996 at the Masaryk Circuit located in Brno, Czech Republic. It was also the first victory for a young Valentino Rossi in the 125cc class.

== 500 cc classification ==
Pos.	Rider	Team	Manufacturer	Time/Retired	Points
1	(Spain) Àlex Crivillé	Team Repsol Honda	Honda	45:38.884	25
2	(Australia) Mick Doohan	Team Repsol Honda	Honda	+0.002	20
3	(United States) Scott Russell	Lucky Strike Suzuki	Suzuki	+2.870	16
4	(United States) Kenny Roberts Jr.	Marlboro Yamaha Roberts	Yamaha	+4.419	13
5	(Italy) Loris Capirossi	Marlboro Yamaha Roberts	Yamaha	+6.753	11
6	(France) Jean-Michel Bayle	Marlboro Yamaha Roberts	Yamaha	+6.858	10
7	(Japan) Tadayuki Okada	Team Repsol Honda	Honda	+8.892	9
8	(Spain) Carlos Checa	Fortuna Honda Pons	Honda	+9.148	8
9	(Brazil) Alex Barros	Honda Pileri	Honda	+13.334	7
10	(Japan) Shinichi Itoh	Team Repsol Honda	Honda	+13.776	6
11	(Japan) Norifumi Abe	Marlboro Yamaha Roberts	Yamaha	+15.009	5
12	(Spain) Alberto Puig	Fortuna Honda Pons	Honda	+17.482	4
13	(United Kingdom) Terry Rymer	Lucky Strike Suzuki	Suzuki	+26.828	3
14	(United Kingdom) Jeremy McWilliams	QUB Team Optimum	ROC Yamaha	+49.242	2
15	(Italy) Marcellino Lucchi	IP Aprilia Racing Team	Aprilia	+49.608	1
16	(Italy) Lucio Pedercini	Team Pedercini	ROC Yamaha	+53.456	
17	(United Kingdom) Sean Emmett	Harris Grand Prix	Harris Yamaha	+1:08.488	
18	(United Kingdom) Eugene McManus	Millar Racing	Yamaha	+1:13.285	
19	(France) Frederic Protat	Soverex FP Racing	Yamaha	+1:13.472	
20	(United Kingdom) Chris Walker	Elf 500 ROC	Elf 500	+1:28.250	
21	(Switzerland) Adrien Bosshard	Elf 500 ROC	ROC Yamaha	+1:29.684	
22	(France) Jean Pierre Jeandat	Team Paton	Paton	+2:01.578	
23	(Australia) Paul Young	Padgett's Racing Team	Harris Yamaha	+1 Lap	
Ret	(United Kingdom) James Haydon	World Championship Motorsports	ROC Yamaha	Retirement	
Ret	(Italy) Luca Cadalora	Kanemoto Honda	Honda	Retirement	
DNS	(Spain) Juan Borja	Elf 500 ROC	Elf 500	Did not start	

== 250 cc classification ==
Pos	Rider	Manufacturer	Time/Retired	Points
1	(Italy) Max Biaggi	Aprilia	42:19.509	25
2	(France) Olivier Jacque	Honda	+5.901	20
3	(Germany) Ralf Waldmann	Honda	+8.317	16
4	(Japan) Tohru Ukawa	Honda	+8.517	13
5	(Germany) Jürgen Fuchs	Honda	+8.662	11
6	(France) Jean-Philippe Ruggia	Honda	+22.095	10
7	(Switzerland) Eskil Suter	Aprilia	+37.969	9
8	(Spain) Luis d'Antin	Honda	+38.309	8
9	(Japan) Tetsuya Harada	Yamaha	+38.418	7
10	(Italy) Roberto Locatelli	Aprilia	+38.502	6
11	(Japan) Nobuatsu Aoki	Honda	+39.177	5
12	(Italy) Cristiano Migliorati	Honda	+43.563	4
13	(Switzerland) Olivier Petrucciani	Aprilia	+43.895	3
14	(Spain) Sete Gibernau	Honda	+44.034	2
15	(Italy) Luca Boscoscuro	Aprilia	+51.376	1
16	(France) Regis Laconi	Honda	+52.275	
17	(Netherlands) Jurgen vd Goorbergh	Honda	+52.336	
18	(Japan) Yasumasa Hatakeyama	Honda	+1:10.761	
19	(Italy) Davide Bulega	Aprilia	+1:11.303	
20	(France) Cristophe Cogan	Honda	+1:47.010	
21	(Czech Republic) Vladimir Castka	Honda	+1:57.111	
22	(Venezuela) José Barresi	Yamaha	+1 Lap	
Ret	(France) Christian Boudinot	Aprilia	Retirement	
Ret	(Japan) Takeshi Tsujimura	Honda	Retirement	
Ret	(Argentina) Sebastian Porto	Aprilia	Retirement	
Ret	(Spain) José Luis Cardoso	Aprilia	Retirement	
Ret	(Japan) Osamu Miyazaki	Aprilia	Retirement	
Ret	(Italy) Gianluigi Scalvini	Honda	Retirement	

Previous race: 1996 Austrian Grand Prix	FIM Grand Prix World Championship; 1996 season	Next race: 1996 Imola Grand Prix
Previous race: 1995 Czech Republic Grand Prix	Czech Republic Grand Prix	Next race: 1997 Czech Republic Grand Prix
