= 1996 Grand Prix motorcycle racing season =

Sports season

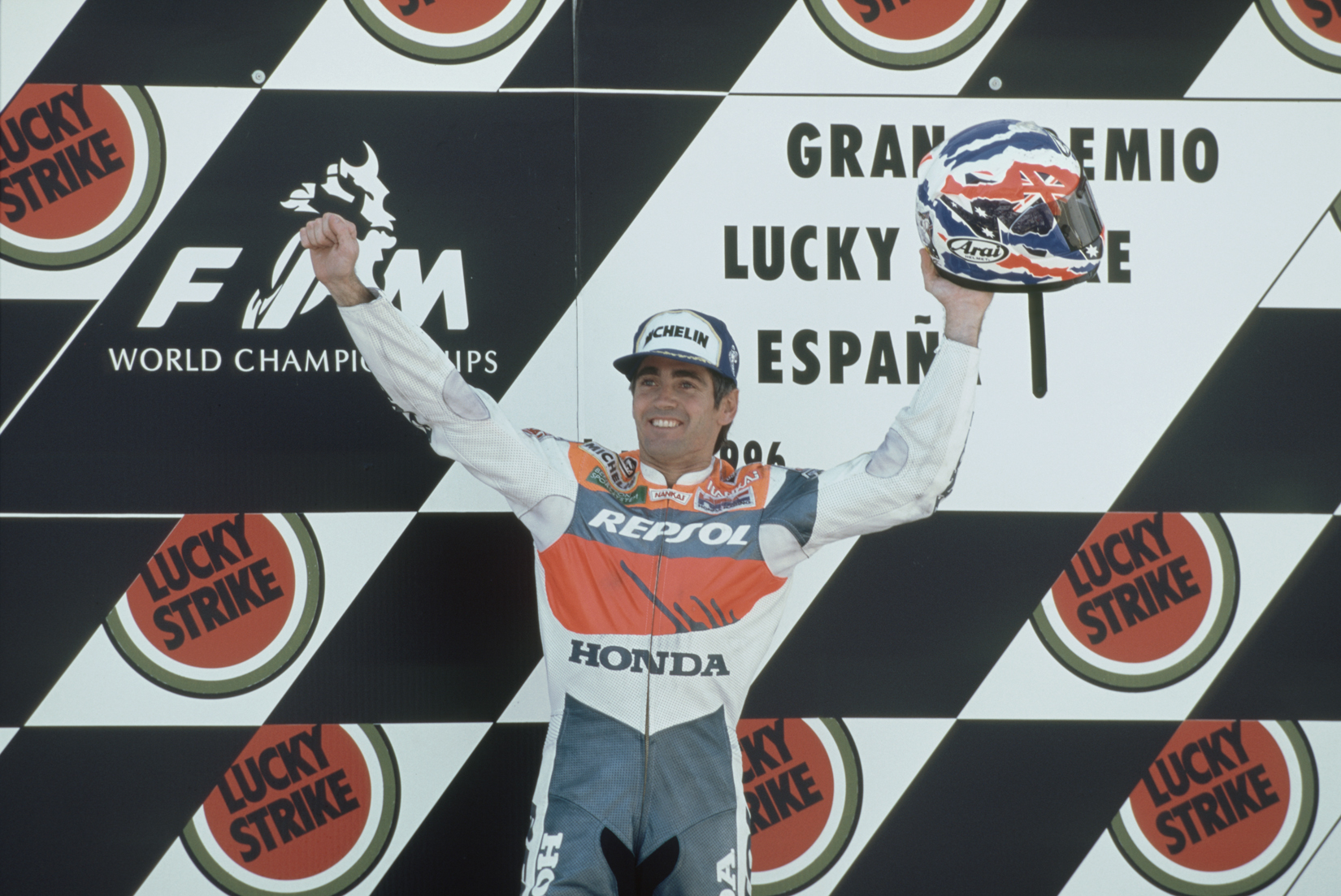
Mick Doohan (pictured at Jerez) became the 1996 500cc world champion

The 1996 Grand Prix motorcycle racing season was the 48th F.I.M. Road Racing World Championship season.

== Season summary ==
Honda's Mick Doohan continued his domination of the 500 class with eight victories. His Repsol Honda teammate, Àlex Crivillé beat him to the line twice in Austria and the Czech Republic. Luca Cadalora, now with the Kanemoto Honda team took two wins for the fourth consecutive year. Suzuki's hopes were dashed when Daryl Beattie suffered head injuries in a pre-season crash. He returned only to crash in Spain then two races later in France which effectively ended his career. Loris Capirossi won his first 500 Grand Prix when Crivillé collided with his teammate, Doohan on the last lap of the Australian round. A new European team made its debut with the Elf team using a Swissauto V4 sidecar engine in an ROC chassis. It proved to be fast but unreliable. Honda introduced the NSR500V, a V twin as a cost-effective alternative for privateer teams.

Max Biaggi claimed his third consecutive 250 championship for Aprilia. Haruchika Aoki repeated as the 125 champion for Honda. Newcomers winning their first Grands Prix were Norifumi Abe in the 500 class, Olivier Jacque in the 250 class and Valentino Rossi in the 125 class.

== 1996 Grand Prix season calendar ==
The following Grands Prix were scheduled to take place in 1996:

Round	Date	Grand Prix	Circuit
1	31 March	Marlboro Grand Prix of Malaysia	Shah Alam Circuit
2	7 April	(Indonesia) Marlboro Indonesian Grand Prix	Sentul International Circuit
3	21 April	Marlboro Grand Prix of Japan	Suzuka Circuit
4	12 May	(Spain) Gran Premio Lucky Strike de España	Circuito Permanente de Jerez
5	26 May	(Italy) Gran Premio d'Italia Polini	Mugello Circuit
6	9 June	Grand Prix de France	Circuit Paul Ricard
7	29 June ††	(Netherlands) Lucky Strike Dutch Grand Prix	TT Circuit Assen
8	7 July	(Germany) Warsteiner Grand Prix Deutschland	Nürburgring
9	21 July	(United Kingdom) British Grand Prix	Donington Park
10	4 August	HB Motorrad Grand Prix Austria	A1-Ring
11	18 August	(Czech Republic) Grand Prix České republiky	Brno Circuit
12	1 September	(Bologna) Gran Premio IP Città di Imola	Autodromo Enzo e Dino Ferrari
13	15 September	(Catalonia) Gran Premi Marlboro de Catalunya	Circuit de Catalunya
14	6 October	(Rio de Janeiro (state)) GP Rio	Autódromo Internacional Nelson Piquet
15	20 October	(Australia) Australian Motorcycle Grand Prix	Eastern Creek

†† = Saturday race

=== Calendar changes ===
- The French Grand Prix moved from the Bugatti Circuit in Le Mans to the Circuit Paul Ricard due to overbid in Le Mans, the Bugatti Circuit returned in 2000.
- The Austrian Grand Prix returned from the calendar after a one-year absence and moved from the Salzburgring to the Österreichring, one year before the track was renamed as the A1-Ring.
- The Indonesian Grand Prix was added to the calendar.
- The Argentine Grand Prix was initially scheduled, but was eventually taken off the calendar.
- The European Grand Prix was renamed the Catalan Grand Prix.

== Participants ==
=== 500cc participants ===
Team	Constructor	Motorcycle	No	Rider	Rounds
(Japan) Team Repsol Honda	Honda	Honda NSR500 (NV0W)	1	(Australia) Mick Doohan	All
(Japan) Team Repsol Honda	Honda	Honda NSR500 (NV0W)	4	(Spain) Àlex Crivillé	All
(Japan) Team Repsol Honda	Honda	Honda NSR500V (NVAA)	6	(Japan) Tadayuki Okada	All
(Japan) Team Repsol Honda	Honda	Honda NSR500V (NVAA)	41	(Japan) Shinichi Itoh	All
(Japan) Lucky Strike Suzuki	Suzuki	Suzuki RGV500 (XR86)	2	(Australia) Daryl Beattie	3–6, 13–14
(Japan) Lucky Strike Suzuki	Suzuki	Suzuki RGV500 (XR86)	11	(United States) Scott Russell	1–4, 6–15
(Japan) Lucky Strike Suzuki	Suzuki	Suzuki RGV500 (XR86)	21	(Japan) Katsuaki Fujiwara	1
(Japan) Lucky Strike Suzuki	Suzuki	Suzuki RGV500 (XR86)	53	(Japan) Katsuaki Fujiwara	3
(Japan) Lucky Strike Suzuki	Suzuki	Suzuki RGV500 (XR86)	26	(United Kingdom) Terry Rymer	5, 7–12
(Japan) Lucky Strike Suzuki	Suzuki	Suzuki RGV500 (XR86)	42	(Australia) Peter Goddard	15
(Japan) Kanemoto Honda	Honda	Honda NSR500	3	(Italy) Luca Cadalora	All
(Italy) Honda Pileri	Honda	Honda NSR500	7	(Brazil) Alex Barros	All
(France) ELF 500 ROC	Elf	Elf 500	8	(Spain) Juan Borja	All
(France) ELF 500 ROC	Elf	Elf 500	14	(Switzerland) Adrian Bosshard	1–5, 7–8
(France) ELF 500 ROC	Elf	Elf 500	28	(France) William Costes	6
(France) ELF 500 ROC	Elf	Elf 500	44	(United Kingdom) Chris Walker	9–14
(France) ELF 500 ROC	Elf	Elf 500	48	(Australia) Marty Craggill	15
(United States) Marlboro Yamaha Roberts	Yamaha	Yamaha YZR500 (OWJ1)	9	(Japan) Norick Abe	All
(United States) Marlboro Yamaha Roberts	Yamaha	Yamaha YZR500 (OWJ1)	10	(United States) Kenny Roberts Jr.	3–15
(United States) Marlboro Yamaha Roberts	Yamaha	Yamaha YZR500 (OWJ1)	12	(France) Jean-Michel Bayle	All
(United Kingdom) QUB Team Optimum	ROC Yamaha	ROC Yamaha GP1	13	(United Kingdom) Jeremy McWilliams	All
(Belgium) ELC Lease ROC	ROC Yamaha	ROC Yamaha GP1	14	(Switzerland) Adrian Bosshard	10–13
(Belgium) ELC Lease ROC	ROC Yamaha	ROC Yamaha GP1	16	(Belgium) Laurent Naveau	1–3, 8, 14–15
(Belgium) ELC Lease ROC	ROC Yamaha	ROC Yamaha GP1	25	(France) Jean-Marc Deletang	5–6
(Italy) IP Aprilia Racing Team	Aprilia	Aprilia RSW-2 500	15	(Italy) Doriano Romboni	1–8, 12
(Italy) IP Aprilia Racing Team	Aprilia	Aprilia RSW-2 500	29	(Italy) Marcellino Lucchi	10–11
(Spain) Fortuna Honda Pons	Honda	Honda NSR500	17	(Spain) Alberto Puig	1–14
(Spain) Fortuna Honda Pons	Honda	Honda NSR500	24	(Spain) Carlos Checa	All
(United Kingdom) WCM	ROC Yamaha	ROC Yamaha GP1	18	(United Kingdom) James Haydon	1–12
(United Kingdom) WCM	ROC Yamaha	ROC Yamaha GP1	30	(New Zealand) Andrew Stroud	13–15
(United Kingdom) WCM	ROC Yamaha	ROC Yamaha GP1	33	(United States) Chris Taylor	14
(United Kingdom) Harris Grand Prix	Harris Yamaha	Harris Yamaha SLS500	19	(United Kingdom) Sean Emmett	1–13
(United Kingdom) Harris Grand Prix	Harris Yamaha	Harris Yamaha SLS500	32	(Belgium) Stéphane Mertens	14–15
(United Kingdom) Padgett's Racing Team	Yamaha	Yamaha YZR500	20	(Japan) Toshiyuki Arakaki	1–8
(United Kingdom) Padgett's Racing Team	Harris Yamaha	Harris Yamaha SLS500	96	(Australia) Paul Young	9–15
(Italy) Team Paton	Paton	Paton V70 C10/2	20	(Japan) Toshiyuki Arakaki	14–15
(Italy) Team Paton	Paton	Paton V70 C10/2	51	(France) Jean-Pierre Jeandat	1–7, 9–13
(Italy) Team Paton	Paton	Paton V70 C10/2	66	(Italy) Marco Papa	12
(Italy) Team Paton	Paton	Paton V70 C10/2	70	(France) Florian Ferracci	8
(Italy) Team Pedercini	ROC Yamaha	ROC Yamaha GP1	22	(Italy) Lucio Pedercini	All
(United Kingdom) Millar Racing	Yamaha	Yamaha YZR500	23	(United Kingdom) Eugene McManus	All
(France) Soverex FP Racing	ROC Yamaha	ROC Yamaha GP1	27	(France) Frédéric Protat	All
(France) Soverex FP Racing	ROC Yamaha	ROC Yamaha GP1	70	(France) Florian Ferracci	6
(Japan) Team HRC	Honda	Honda NSR500	52	(Japan) Takuma Aoki	3
(Germany) Suzuki Deutschland	Suzuki	Suzuki RGV500	54	(Germany) Michael Rudroff	8
(Switzerland) Team Schmassmann	Harris Yamaha	Harris Yamaha SLS500	55	(Switzerland) Niggi Schmassmann	8
(Italy) RTM Corse	RTM Suzuki	RTM 500	64	(Italy) Andrea Zambotti	12
(United States) Marlboro Yamaha Rainey	Yamaha	Yamaha YZR500 (OWJ1)	65	(Italy) Loris Capirossi	All
(Italy) Team Leone Racing	ROC Yamaha	ROC Yamaha GP1	66	(Italy) Marco Papa	5
(Austria) Team Truchsess	ROC Yamaha	ROC Yamaha GP1	69	(Austria) Karl Truchsess	10

Key
Regular rider
Wildcard rider
Replacement rider

== Results and standings ==
=== Grands Prix ===
Round	Date	Grand Prix	Circuit	125cc winner	250cc winner	500cc winner	Report
1	31 March	(Malaysia) Malaysian motorcycle Grand Prix	Shah Alam	(Italy) Stefano Perugini	(Italy) Max Biaggi	(Italy) Luca Cadalora	Report
2	7 April	(Indonesia) Indonesian motorcycle Grand Prix	Sentul	(Japan) Masaki Tokudome	(Japan) Tetsuya Harada	(Australia) Mick Doohan	Report
3	21 April	(Japan) Japanese motorcycle Grand Prix	Suzuka	(Japan) Masaki Tokudome	(Italy) Max Biaggi	(Japan) Norifumi Abe	Report
4	12 May	(Spain) Spanish motorcycle Grand Prix	Jerez	(Japan) Haruchika Aoki	(Italy) Max Biaggi	(Australia) Mick Doohan	Report
5	26 May	(Italy) Italian motorcycle Grand Prix	Mugello	(Germany) Peter Öttl	(Italy) Max Biaggi	(Australia) Mick Doohan	Report
6	9 June	(France) French motorcycle Grand Prix	Paul Ricard	(Italy) Stefano Perugini	(Italy) Max Biaggi	(Australia) Mick Doohan	Report
7	29 June ††	(Netherlands) Dutch TT	Assen	(Spain) Emilio Alzamora	(Germany) Ralf Waldmann	(Australia) Mick Doohan	Report
8	7 July	(Germany) German motorcycle Grand Prix	Nürburgring	(Japan) Masaki Tokudome	(Germany) Ralf Waldmann	(Italy) Luca Cadalora	Report
9	21 July	(United Kingdom) British motorcycle Grand Prix	Donington	(Italy) Stefano Perugini	(Italy) Max Biaggi	(Australia) Mick Doohan	Report
10	4 August	(Austria) Austrian motorcycle Grand Prix	A1-Ring	(Italy) Ivan Goi	(Germany) Ralf Waldmann	(Spain) Àlex Crivillé	Report
11	18 August	Czech Republic motorcycle Grand Prix	Brno	(Italy) Valentino Rossi	(Italy) Max Biaggi	(Spain) Àlex Crivillé	Report
12	1 September	(Bologna) City of Imola motorcycle Grand Prix	Imola	(Japan) Masaki Tokudome	(Germany) Ralf Waldmann	(Australia) Mick Doohan	Report
13	15 September	(Catalonia) Catalan motorcycle Grand Prix	Catalunya	(Japan) Tomomi Manako	(Italy) Max Biaggi	(Spain) Carlos Checa	Report
14	6 October	(Rio de Janeiro (state)) Rio de Janeiro motorcycle Grand Prix	Rio de Janeiro	(Japan) Haruchika Aoki	(France) Olivier Jacque	(Australia) Mick Doohan	Report
15	20 October	(Australia) Australian motorcycle Grand Prix	Eastern Creek	(Australia) Garry McCoy	(Italy) Max Biaggi	(Italy) Loris Capirossi	Report

†† = Saturday race

=== 500cc riders' standings ===
Scoring system

Points are awarded to the top fifteen finishers. A rider has to finish the race to earn points.

Position	**1st**	**2nd**	**3rd**	**4th**	**5th**	**6th**	**7th**	**8th**	**9th**	**10th**	**11th**	**12th**	**13th**	**14th**	**15th**
Points	25	20	16	13	11	10	9	8	7	6	5	4	3	2	1

Pos	Rider	Bike	MAL (Malaysia)	INA (Indonesia)	JPN (Japan)	ESP (Spain)	ITA (Italy)	FRA (France)	NED (Netherlands)	GER (Germany)	GBR (United Kingdom)	AUT (Austria)	CZE (Czech Republic)	IMO (Bologna)	CAT (Catalonia)	RIO (Rio de Janeiro (state))	AUS (Australia)	Pts
1	(Australia) Mick Doohan	Honda NSR500	5	**1**	6	**1**	**1**	1	1	2	**1**	**2**	2	**1**	**2**	**1**	8	309
2	(Spain) Àlex Crivillé	Honda NSR500	Ret	4	**2**	Ret	2	**2**	**2**	**3**	2	1	1	2	3	2	**6**	245
3	(Italy) Luca Cadalora	Honda NSR500	1	6	Ret	2	3	6	Ret	1	9	4	Ret	6	4	6	7	168
4	(Brazil) Alex Barros	Honda NSR500	2	2	Ret	8	6	7	3	8	7	5	9	8	8	5	4	158
5	(Japan) Norifumi Abe	Yamaha YZR500	8	9	1	Ret	11	4	6	6	3	3	11	5	10	3	Ret	148
6	(United States) Scott Russell	Suzuki RGV500	4	7	3	DNS		5	4	4	5	6	3	7	11	9	Ret	133
7	(Japan) Tadayuki Okada	Honda NSR500V	**Ret**	Ret	4	3	7	Ret	13	7	4	11	7	3	5	8	2	132
8	(Spain) Carlos Checa	Honda NSR500	3	5	10	10	DNS	Ret	11	Ret	12	7	8	11	1	4	3	124
9	(France) Jean-Michel Bayle	Yamaha YZR500	6	8	8	7	5	Ret	8	10	Ret	9	**6**	4	Ret	7	5	110
10	(Italy) Loris Capirossi	Yamaha YZR500	Ret	3	Ret	4	Ret	Ret	Ret	12	6	8	5	Ret	9	12	1	98
11	(Spain) Alberto Puig	Honda NSR500	7	10	9	5	12	3	12	11	11	13	12	12	7	10		93
12	(Japan) Shinichi Ito	Honda NSR500V	Ret	13	11	9	8	Ret	10	9	10	Ret	10	9	6	11	9	77
13	(United States) Kenny Roberts Jr.	Yamaha YZR500			12	6	10	Ret	5	5	Ret	Ret	4	10	Ret	13	11	69
14	(Spain) Juan Borja	ELF 500	10	Ret	18	11	Ret	Ret	9	Ret	8	10	DNS	Ret	Ret	14	Ret	34
15	(France) Frédéric Protat	ROC-Yamaha	9	14	Ret	13	15	8	15	14	14	Ret	19	Ret	13	16	13	32
16	(United Kingdom) Jeremy McWilliams	ROC-Yamaha	14	12	13	14	16	11	14	Ret	Ret	14	14	Ret	12	Ret	Ret	26
17	(Italy) Lucio Pedercini	ROC-Yamaha	12	Ret	Ret	20	13	10	Ret	13	15	16	16	13	Ret	15	12	25
18	(Australia) Daryl Beattie	Suzuki RGV500			5	Ret	4	DNS							Ret	DNS		24
19	(Italy) Doriano Romboni	Aprilia RSW-2 500	Ret	11	7	Ret	9	Ret	Ret	Ret				14	WD			23
20	(United Kingdom) Terry Rymer	Suzuki RGV500					Ret		7	Ret	Ret	12	13	Ret				16
21	(United Kingdom) James Haydon	ROC-Yamaha	15	18	15	12	17	9	Ret	DNS	13	17	Ret	Ret				16
22	(United Kingdom) Sean Emmett	Harris-Yamaha	11	15	17	15	14	Ret	Ret	Ret	Ret	Ret	17	16	Ret			9
23	(Australia) Peter Goddard	Suzuki RGV500															10	6
24	(United Kingdom) Eugene McManus	Yamaha	Ret	Ret	16	16	18	12	Ret	15	17	19	18	15	Ret	Ret	Ret	6
25	(Japan) Toshiyuki Arakaki	Harris-Yamaha	17	17	14	17	Ret	15	Ret									4
25	(Japan) Toshiyuki Arakaki	Paton V70 C10/2														Ret	15	4
26	(Belgium) Laurent Naveau	ROC-Yamaha	13	16	Ret					Ret						18	Ret	3
27	(France) Florian Ferracci	ROC-Yamaha						13										3
27	(France) Florian Ferracci	Paton V70 C10/2								16								3
28	(France) Jean-Marc Delétang	ROC-Yamaha					Ret	14										2
29	(Australia) Paul Young	Harris-Yamaha									Ret	20	23	Ret	14	Ret	Ret	2
30	(New Zealand) Andrew Stroud	ROC-Yamaha													Ret		14	2
31	(United Kingdom) Chris Walker	ELF 500									16	15	20	Ret	15	17		2
32	(Italy) Marcellino Lucchi	Aprilia RSA500										18	15					1
	(France) Jean-Pierre Jeandat	Paton V70 C10	16		Ret	18	Ret	Ret			Ret	21	22	17				0
	(Belgium) Stéphane Mertens	Harris-Yamaha														19	16	0
	(Switzerland) Nicholas Schmassma	Yamaha								17								0
	(Italy) Marco Papa	ROC-Yamaha					19							18				0
	(Switzerland) Adrian Bosshard	ELF 500	Ret	Ret	Ret	19	Ret		Ret	Ret		Ret	21	Ret	Ret			0
	(Japan) Katsuaki Fujiwara	Suzuki RGV500	DNS		Ret													0
	(Japan) Takuma Aoki	Honda NSR500			Ret													0
	(Germany) Michael Rudroff	Suzuki RGV500								Ret								0
	(Australia) Martin Craggill	ELF 500															Ret	0
Pos	Rider	Bike	MAL (Malaysia)	INA (Indonesia)	JPN (Japan)	ESP (Spain)	ITA (Italy)	FRA (France)	NED (Netherlands)	GER (Germany)	GBR (United Kingdom)	AUT (Austria)	CZE (Czech Republic)	IMO (Bologna)	CAT (Catalonia)	RIO (Rio de Janeiro (state))	AUS (Australia)	Pts

Colour	Result
Gold	Winner
Silver	Second place
Bronze	Third place
Green	Points classification
Blue	Non-points classification
Blue	Non-classified finish (NC)
Purple	Retired, not classified (Ret)
Red	Did not qualify (DNQ)
Red	Did not pre-qualify (DNPQ)
Black	Disqualified (DSQ)
White	Did not start (DNS)
White	Withdrew (WD)
White	Race cancelled (C)
Blank	Did not practice (DNP)
Blank	Did not arrive (DNA)
Blank	Excluded (EX)

**Bold** – Pole
Italics – Fastest Lap

=== 250cc riders' standings ===
Scoring system

Points are awarded to the top fifteen finishers. A rider has to finish the race to earn points.

Position	**1st**	**2nd**	**3rd**	**4th**	**5th**	**6th**	**7th**	**8th**	**9th**	**10th**	**11th**	**12th**	**13th**	**14th**	**15th**
Points	25	20	16	13	11	10	9	8	7	6	5	4	3	2	1

Pos	Rider	Bike	MAL (Malaysia)	INA (Indonesia)	JPN (Japan)	ESP (Spain)	ITA (Italy)	FRA (France)	NED (Netherlands)	GER (Germany)	GBR (United Kingdom)	AUT (Austria)	CZE (Czech Republic)	IMO (Bologna)	CAT (Catalonia)	RIO (Rio de Janeiro (state))	AUS (Australia)	Pts
1	(Italy) Max Biaggi	Aprilia	**1**	2	1	**1**	**1**	**1**	3	4	1	Ret	**1**	**Ret**	**1**	Ret	**1**	274
2	(Germany) Ralf Waldmann	Honda	DNS	3	8	3	3	2	1	**1**	2	1	3	1	3	2	2	268
3	(France) Olivier Jacque	Honda	4	8	4	7	4	Ret	**Ret**	2	**3**	**Ret**	2	2	2	**1**	3	193
4	(Germany) Jürgen Fuchs	Honda	7	6	12	4	5	Ret	2	3	4	3	5	4	5	3	5	174
5	(Japan) Tohru Ukawa	Honda	Ret	7	5	5	DNS	4	Ret	10	5	4	4	3	4	4	4	142
6	(Spain) Luis d'Antin	Honda	3	4	9	6	9	10	6	5	Ret	2	8	6	13	7	8	138
7	(Japan) Nobuatsu Aoki	Honda	6	5	6	Ret	8	5	7	11	8	6	11	Ret	7	Ret	7	105
8	(Japan) Tetsuya Harada	Yamaha	2	**1**	**Ret**	2	6	3	10	Ret	DNS	Ret	9	Ret				104
9	(France) Jean-Philippe Ruggia	Honda	5	10	10	8	7	Ret	Ret	7	Ret	5	6	Ret	Ret	5	6	91
10	(Italy) Luca Boscoscuro	Aprilia	9	13	21	10	13	6	12	6	Ret	7	15	14	18	9	Ret	62
11	(Netherlands) Jurgen van den Goorbergh	Honda	8	12	Ret	Ret	15	12	4	Ret	Ret	8	17	8	14	13	11	56
12	(Japan) Takeshi Tsujimura	Honda	12	Ret	11	14	Ret	13	Ret	Ret	6	10	Ret	7	11	10	10	56
13	(Switzerland) Eskil Suter	Aprilia	Ret	11	19	Ret	12	7	5	13	10	Ret	7	Ret	9	15	Ret	55
14	(Italy) Cristiano Migliorati	Honda	13	Ret	Ret	13	10	9	11	9	9	Ret	12	Ret	8	Ret	Ret	50
15	(France) Régis Laconi	Honda	Ret	16	14	Ret	14	11	Ret	8	7	9	16	Ret	10	Ret	12	43
16	(Italy) Marcellino Lucchi	Aprilia					2			Ret	Ret			5	6			41
17	(Italy) Roberto Locatelli	Aprilia	10	Ret	18	Ret	Ret	8	Ret			Ret	10	12		6	9	41
18	(United Kingdom) Jamie Robinson	Aprilia	11	Ret	22	9	17	Ret	9	Ret	Ret	17	Ret	9	Ret	Ret	Ret	26
19	(Argentina) Sebastián Porto	Aprilia	Ret	9	16	12	16	16	Ret	20		13	Ret	Ret	12	12	13	25
20	(Japan) Osamu Miyazaki	Aprilia	15	Ret	13	15	20	Ret	8	12	12	Ret	Ret	16	15	Ret	DNS	22
21	(Japan) Noriyasu Numata	Suzuki			2													20
22	(Spain) Sete Gibernau	Yamaha													Ret	8	Ret	20
23	(Japan) Daijiro Kato	Honda			3													16
24	(Italy) Davide Bulega	Aprilia	14	14	Ret	16	21	17	13	18	15	Ret	19	10	17	Ret	Ret	14
25	(Switzerland) Oliver Petrucciani	Aprilia	Ret	19	24	Ret	18	15	Ret	14	Ret	11	13	17	Ret	14	Ret	13
26	(Italy) Gianluigi Scalvini	Honda	Ret	18	Ret	19	Ret	19	Ret	Ret	Ret	16	Ret	11	16	11	Ret	10
27	(Japan) Kensuke Haga	Yamaha			7													9
28	(Japan) Yasumasa Hatakeyama	Honda	Ret	15	15	18	22	14	14	15	Ret	15	18	15	DNS	16	Ret	9
29	(Italy) Alessandro Antonello	Aprilia					19			Ret	13	12	DNS		19	17	15	8
30	(Italy) Massimo Ottobre	Aprilia	Ret	Ret	Ret	17	11	18	15									6
31	(Spain) José Luis Cardoso	Aprilia	Ret	Ret	23		DNS	Ret	Ret			Ret	Ret	13	Ret	Ret	Ret	3
32	(France) Christophe Cogan	Honda	Ret	20	25	Ret	28	21	16	17	14	19	20	20	Ret	18	Ret	2
33	(France) Christian Boudinot	Aprilia	Ret	Ret	Ret	Ret	25	Ret	Ret	16	18	14	Ret	Ret	Ret	Ret	Ret	2
34	(Australia) Marcus Payten	Honda														19	14	2
Pos	Rider	Bike	MAL (Malaysia)	INA (Indonesia)	JPN (Japan)	ESP (Spain)	ITA (Italy)	FRA (France)	NED (Netherlands)	GER (Germany)	GBR (United Kingdom)	AUT (Austria)	CZE (Czech Republic)	IMO (Bologna)	CAT (Catalonia)	RIO (Rio de Janeiro (state))	AUS (Australia)	Pts

Colour	Result
Gold	Winner
Silver	Second place
Bronze	Third place
Green	Points classification
Blue	Non-points classification
Blue	Non-classified finish (NC)
Purple	Retired, not classified (Ret)
Red	Did not qualify (DNQ)
Red	Did not pre-qualify (DNPQ)
Black	Disqualified (DSQ)
White	Did not start (DNS)
White	Withdrew (WD)
White	Race cancelled (C)
Blank	Did not practice (DNP)
Blank	Did not arrive (DNA)
Blank	Excluded (EX)

**Bold** – Pole
Italics – Fastest Lap

=== 125cc riders' standings ===
Scoring system

Points are awarded to the top fifteen finishers. A rider has to finish the race to earn points.

Position	**1st**	**2nd**	**3rd**	**4th**	**5th**	**6th**	**7th**	**8th**	**9th**	**10th**	**11th**	**12th**	**13th**	**14th**	**15th**
Points	25	20	16	13	11	10	9	8	7	6	5	4	3	2	1

Pos	Rider	Bike	MAL (Malaysia)	INA (Indonesia)	JPN (Japan)	ESP (Spain)	ITA (Italy)	FRA (France)	NED (Netherlands)	GER (Germany)	GBR (United Kingdom)	AUT (Austria)	CZE (Czech Republic)	IMO (Bologna)	CAT (Catalonia)	RIO (Rio de Janeiro (state))	AUS (Australia)	Pts
1	(Japan) Haruchika Aoki	Honda	2	**2**	2	1	2	7	3	3	8	NC	6	NC	5	**1**	**2**	220
2	(Japan) Masaki Tokudome	Aprilia	4	1	1	6	**14**	**NC**	**NC**	1	**2**	**4**	13	1	Ret	3	3	193
3	(Japan) Tomomi Manako	Honda	7	7	4	8	9	2	5	8	3	8	3	6	1	NC	9	167
4	(Spain) Emilio Alzamora	Honda	5	NC	NC	2	7	3	1	4	NC	NC	5	2	4	2	NC	158
5	(Spain) Jorge Martínez	Aprilia	NC	5	8	**NC**	13	NC	9	**7**	4	6	2	**3**	8	4	4	131
6	(Italy) Stefano Perugini	Aprilia	1	8	12	7	NC	1	13	2	1	NC	14		NC	9	NC	128
7	(Japan) Noboru Ueda	Honda	9	6	**3**	3	12	4	4	12	6	11	NC	11	11	6	8	126
8	(Japan) Kazuto Sakata	Aprilia	**10**	14	Ret	5	3	8	7	11	5	9	4	12	3	11	Ret	113
9	(Italy) Valentino Rossi	Aprilia	6	11	11	4	4	Ret	Ret	5	Ret	3	**1**	5	Ret	Ret	14	111
10	(Italy) Ivan Goi	Honda	16	13	19	10	8	12	2	10	12	1	9	7	9	15	5	110
11	(Germany) Peter Öttl	Aprilia	3	3	NC	11	1	NC		6	11	5	7	NC	NC			97
12	(Australia) Garry McCoy	Aprilia	12	Ret	Ret	Ret	20	9	18	Ret	14	Ret	11	4	2	5	1	87
13	(Germany) Dirk Raudies	Honda	NC	4	NC	13	NC	6	6	16	NC	2	10	14	10	10	11	81
14	(Japan) Yoshiaki Katoh	Yamaha	NC	NC	NC	9	16	5	NC	18	7	16	12	8	7	12	7	61
15	(Italy) Lucio Cecchinello	Honda	NC	12	7	NC	6	Ret	NC	14	9	18	8	NC	Ret	7	6	59
16	(Germany) Manfred Geissler	Aprilia	NC	NC	5	12	10	11	8	9	20	10	16	9	NC	16	NC	54
17	(Japan) Akira Saito	Honda	8	9	NC	24	5	10	16	19	NC	12	15	16	Ret	17	10	43
18	(Japan) Youichi Ui	Yamaha	Ret		Ret	17	18	15	14	Ret	10	7	Ret	Ret	**6**	8		36
19	(France) Frédéric Petit	Honda	11	15	20	18	NC	13	11	15	NC	15	18	10	NC	14	12	28
20	(Spain) Herri Torrontegui	Honda				20	NC	14	10	21	15	13	19	15	12	NC	15	18
21	(Italy) Andrea Ballerini	Aprilia	13	10	17	19	11	NC	NC	NC	19	NC	NC	20				14
22	(United Kingdom) Darren Barton	Aprilia	NC	16	9	14	22	NC	NC	NC	13	NC	NC	18	NC			12
23	(Czech Republic) Jaroslav Huleš	Honda	14	17	14	22	15	NC	NC	17	18	17	17	13	13	15	NC	12
24	(Japan) Masao Azuma	Honda			6													10
25	(Spain) Josep Sarda	Honda	19	19	16	16	17	NC	NC	13	NC	14		NC	NC	13		8
26	(Japan) Shigeru Ibaraki	Yamaha			10													6
27	(Netherlands) Loek Bodelier	Honda	18	NC		21	NC	17	12	NC	NC	20	24	NC	NC	Ret	NC	4
28	(Italy) Paolo Tessari	Honda	15	18	13		NC	16	17	20	17	NC	20	17				4
29	(Italy) Luigi Ancona	Aprilia												23		18	13	3
30	(Italy) Mirko Giansanti	Honda					NC								14	NC	16	2
31	(Italy) Gabriele Debbia	Yamaha	NC	NC	NC	23	21	18	15	NC	16	NC	23	21	15	19	17	2
32	(Japan) Shinichi Sugaya	Honda			15													1
33	(Spain) Jose Ramon Ramirez	Yamaha		NC		15									NC			1
34	(Indonesia) Petrus Canisius	Yamaha		20														0
	(Indonesia) Ahmad Jayadi	Yamaha		21														0
Pos	Rider	Bike	MAL (Malaysia)	INA (Indonesia)	JPN (Japan)	ESP (Spain)	ITA (Italy)	FRA (France)	NED (Netherlands)	GER (Germany)	GBR (United Kingdom)	AUT (Austria)	CZE (Czech Republic)	IMO (Bologna)	CAT (Catalonia)	RIO (Rio de Janeiro (state))	AUS (Australia)	Pts

Colour	Result
Gold	Winner
Silver	Second place
Bronze	Third place
Green	Points classification
Blue	Non-points classification
Blue	Non-classified finish (NC)
Purple	Retired, not classified (Ret)
Red	Did not qualify (DNQ)
Red	Did not pre-qualify (DNPQ)
Black	Disqualified (DSQ)
White	Did not start (DNS)
White	Withdrew (WD)
White	Race cancelled (C)
Blank	Did not practice (DNP)
Blank	Did not arrive (DNA)
Blank	Excluded (EX)

**Bold** – Pole
Italics – Fastest Lap
