= Sean Emmett =

British motorcycle racer

- Nationality: English
- Born: 4 February 1970 (age 56); Walton-on-Thames, Surrey, England
Motorcycle racing career statistics
Grand Prix motorcycle racing
Active years	1993 - 1996
First race	1993 500cc Australian Grand Prix
Last race	1996 500cc Catalan Grand Prix
Team	Suzuki
Championships	0
Starts / Wins / Podiums / Poles / F. laps / Points; 52 / 0 / 0 / 0 / 0 / 79

Sean Emmett (born 4 February 1970) is an English former professional Grand Prix motorcycle road racer.

== Racing career ==
Born in Walton on Thames, Emmett began his career in 1989 at Brands Hatch. In 1989, he won the 350cc Production Championship. He also won the Avon Tyres Trophy for "the most talented young rider with the most promising future". Previous winners included John Surtees, Mike Hailwood and Barry Sheene. He competed in his first Grand Prix in 1993 riding for the Shell-Harris Yamaha team, finishing the season in 19th place in the F.I.M. 500cc class. In 1994, Emmett finished in 15th place as a member of the Suzuki factory racing team, followed by two 22nd-place finishes in 1995 and 1996.

In 1999, Emmett competed in the Superbike World Championship, finishing in 28th place aboard a Ducati. Also in 1999, he won the closest ever British Superbike Championship race, defeating Troy Bayliss by just 0.001sec. In the 2001 Superbike World Championship, he finished in 32nd place after competing as a wildcard in a single event.

Emmett competed in the British Superbike Championship between 1997 and 2008. During which he was on the podium 65 times with 19 race wins. His most successful years were in 2001 and 2002, when he finished the year in third place.

In 2008, Emmett participated in the Yamaha R1 Cup, a support series to the British Superbike Championship. Sean started the campaign well however, the series was dominated by Jon Kirkham the eventual series winner.

In 2011, Emmett won on a RGV 500 (formerly ridden by Kenny Roberts, Jr. in 1999) at the Bikers Classic Meeting at Spa Francorchamps Circuit in Belgium. In February 2013, Emmett won in the South African Classic TT racing series "Day of the Champion" at Zwartkops Circuit.

== Personal life ==
On 19 February 2013, Emmett's 27-year-old new wife Abigail Elson died in a fall from the open window of their hotel room in Dubai.

They were spending a two-day stopover on the return trip back to UK from their honeymoon in Cape Town, South Africa. Emmett's passport was confiscated and he was detained for ten months in Dubai during the subsequent investigation. Emmett told the BBC that he suspected local media in Dubai intended to implicate him as a murder suspect.

Emmett was allowed to return from Dubai after ten months, but on landing at Heathrow Airport on 5 December 2013 was arrested on suspicion of murder by Surrey police, who conducted their own investigation of the circumstances. Emmett was bailed several times during the investigation. In February 2016, a statement by Surrey police confirmed Emmett's bail had been cancelled and no further action would be taken. The inquest into Abigail's death is still ongoing as of October 2020. Emmett testified during the inquest, but declined to answer questions about allegations of domestic violence in his relationship with Ms Elson, repeatedly stating "I decline to answer that".

In October 2014, a Domestic Violence Protection Order was imposed on Emmett after an altercation with his girlfriend at a pub. He was subsequently jailed for 28 days for violating this order. In March 2015 Emmett was jailed for three months for assaulting his girlfriend.

== Career statistics ==
=== Grand Prix motorcycle racing ===
Points system from 1993

**Position**	1	2	3	4	5	6	7	8	9	10	11	12	13	14	15
**Points**	25	20	16	13	11	10	9	8	7	6	5	4	3	2	1

(key) (Races in bold indicate pole position; races in italics indicate fastest lap)

Year	Class	Team	Machine	1	2	3	4	5	6	7	8	9	10	11	12	13	14	15	Points	Rank	Wins
1993	500cc	Shell Harris-Yamaha	YZR500	AUS; 16	MAL; 14	JPN; 15	ESP; 9	AUT; 16	GER; NC	NED; 16	EUR; 12	RSM; NC	GBR; NC	CZE; NC	ITA; NC	USA; 13	FIM; 14		19	19th	0
1994	500cc	Shell Harris-Yamaha	YZR500	AUS; 14	MAL; 13	JPN; 17	ESP; NC	AUT; 12	GER; 11	NED; NC	ITA; 14	FRA; NC	GBR; 12	CZE; 13	USA; 11				34	15th	0
1994	500cc	Lucky Strike Suzuki	RGV500													ARG; 10	EUR; NC		34	15th	0
1995	500cc	Lucky Strike Suzuki	RGV500	AUS; 12	MAL; NC	JPN; 13	ESP; NC	GER -	ITA; NC	NED; NC	FRA; NC	GBR; 13	CZE; 13	BRA; 10	ARG; 11	EUR; NC			17	22nd	0
1996	500cc	Shell Harris-Yamaha	YZR500	MAL; 11	INA; 15	JPN; 17	ESP; 15	ITA; 14	FRA; NC	NED; NC	GER; NC	GBR; DNS	AUT; NC	CZE; 17	IMO; 16	CAT; NC	BRA -	AUS -	9	22nd	0

=== British Superbike Championship ===
(key) (Races in bold indicate pole position; races in italics indicate fastest lap)

Year	Class	Bike	1		2		3		4		5		6		7		8		9		10		11		12		13		Pos	Pts
Year	Class	Bike	R1	R2	R1	R2	R1	R2	R1	R2	R1	R2	R1	R2	R1	R2	R1	R2	R1	R2	R1	R2	R1	R2	R1	R2	R1	R2	Pos	Pts
2001	BSB	Ducati	DON; Ret	DON; 6	SIL; 5	SIL; 4	SNE; 4	SNE; 4	OUL; 3	OUL; 6	BRH; Ret	BRA; Ret	THR; 3	THR; 4	OUL; 4	OUL; 4	KNO; 2	KNO; 3	CAD; 4	CAD; 3	BRH; 3	BRH; 3	MAL; 2	MAL; 8	ROC; 1	ROC; 3	DON; 4	DON; 10	3rd	326
2004	BSB	Ducati	SIL; 5	SIL; 4	**BHI**; Ret	**BHI**; 1	SNE; 4	SNE; 3	OUL; 8	OUL; Ret	MON; 6	MON; 7	THR; 3	THR; 1	BHGP; 2	BHGP; 2	KNO; Ret	KNO; 2	MAL; 7	MAL; 5	CRO; 7	CRO; 11	CAD; 10	CAD; 3	OUL; 4	OUL; 4	DON; 5	DON; 3	5th	315
2006	BSB	Kawasaki/Honda	BHI; 13	BHI; Ret	DON; Ret	DON; Ret	THR; Ret	THR; Ret	OUL	OUL	MON; C	MON; C	MAL	MAL	SNE; Ret	SNE; Ret	KNO	KNO	OUL	OUL	CRO	CRO	CAD	CAD	SIL	SIL	BHGP	BHGP	30th	3

Year	Bike	1			2			3			4			5			6			7			8			9			10			11			12			Pos	Pts
Year	Bike	R1	R2	R3	R1	R2	R3	R1	R2	R3	R1	R2	R3	R1	R2	R3	R1	R2	R3	R1	R2	R3	R1	R2	R3	R1	R2	R3	R1	R2	R3	R1	R2	R3	R1	R2	R3	Pos	Pts
2008	Yamaha/Honda	THR; 11	THR; Ret		OUL	OUL		BHGP	BHGP		DON	DON		SNE	SNE		MAL; Ret	MAL; DNS		OUL	OUL		KNO	KNO		CAD	CAD		CRO	CRO		SIL	SIL		BHI	BHI		27th	5
