= City of Imola motorcycle Grand Prix =

Imola Grand Prix

Grand Prix motorcycle racing
- Venue: Imola Circuit (1996–1999)
- First race: 1996
- Last race: 1999
- Most wins (rider): Mick Doohan (3)
- Most wins (manufacturer): Honda (9)

The City of Imola motorcycle Grand Prix was a round of the FIM Grand Prix motorcycle racing championship between 1996 and 1999.

== History ==
The first City of Imola Grand Prix was held in 1996 (2 years after 1994 Formula One San Marino Grand Prix tragedy that killed Roland Ratzenberger and Ayrton Senna), its official name being in Italian (Città di Imola).

It was the first time since the 1983 San Marino Grand Prix that a motorcycle grand prix race was held at Imola.

The amount of spectators who visited the inaugural Grand Prix that year was lower than expected, averaging at only 30.000 people. This was low compared to the events held in the past on the same circuit.

The race was nonetheless exciting when heavy rain suddenly hit the circuit at lap 18 of 25, causing the red flag to be brought out and the race to be suspended.

The results from lap 16 were counted and full points were rewarded because more than 75% of the race was ridden. The win went to the Australian Mick Doohan.

The event in 1997 was visited even worse: only around 28.000 came to see all sessions combined.

In 2000, the City of Imola Grand Prix was taken off the calendar, presumably because of declining spectator attendance.

== Official names and sponsors ==
- 1996: Gran Premio IP Città di Imola
- 1997: Gran Premio Città di Imola (no official sponsor)
- 1998: Gran Premio Cirio Città di Imola
- 1999: Gran Premio Breil Città di Imola

== Winners ==
=== Multiple winners (riders) ===
# Wins	Rider	Wins	
# Wins	Rider	Category	Years won
3	(Australia) Mick Doohan	500cc	1996, 1997, 1998
2	(Italy) Valentino Rossi	250cc	1998
2	(Italy) Valentino Rossi	125cc	1997

=== Multiple winners (manufacturers) ===
# Wins	Manufacturer	Wins	
# Wins	Manufacturer	Category	Years won
9	(Japan) Honda	500cc	1996, 1997, 1998, 1999
9	(Japan) Honda	250cc	1996, 1997, 1999
9	(Japan) Honda	125cc	1998, 1999
3	(Italy) Aprilia	250cc	1998
3	(Italy) Aprilia	125cc	1996, 1997

=== By year ===
Year	Track	125cc		250cc		500cc		Report
Year	Track	Rider	Manufacturer	Rider	Manufacturer	Rider	Manufacturer	Report
1999	Imola	(Italy) Marco Melandri	Honda	(Italy) Loris Capirossi	Honda	(Spain) Àlex Crivillé	Honda	Report
1998	Imola	(Japan) Tomomi Manako	Honda	(Italy) Valentino Rossi	Aprilia	(Australia) Mick Doohan	Honda	Report
1997	Imola	(Italy) Valentino Rossi	Aprilia	(Italy) Max Biaggi	Honda	(Australia) Mick Doohan	Honda	Report
1996	Imola	(Japan) Masaki Tokudome	Aprilia	(Germany) Ralf Waldmann	Honda	(Australia) Mick Doohan	Honda	Report

== Sources ==
- 50 Years Of Moto Grand Prix (1st edition). Hazelton Publishing Ltd, 1999. ISBN 1-874557-83-7
