= Paul Young (motorcyclist) =

Australian motorcycle racer

- Nationality: Australian
- Born: 24 February 1969 (age 57); Adelaide, Australia

Paul Young (born 24 February 1969) is a former Grand Prix motorcycle racer from Australia. He worked for and raced Triumph Motorcycles.

== Career statistics ==
=== By season ===
Season	Class	Motorcycle	Race	Win	Podium	Pole	FLap	Pts	Plcd
1996	500cc	Harris Yamaha	7	0	0	0	0	2	NC
Total			**7**	**0**	**0**	**0**	**0**	**2**	

=== British Supersport Championship ===
(key) (Races in bold indicate pole position, races in italics indicate fastest lap)

Year	Bike	1	2	3	4	5	6	7	8	9	10	11	12	Pos	Pts
2009	Triumph	BHI; 9	OUL; Ret	DON; DSQ	THR; 7	SNE; 9	KNO	MAL	BHGP; 12	CAD; 14	CRO; 17	SIL; Ret	OUL; 14	19th	31
2010	Triumph	BHI; 7	THR; Ret	OUL; Ret	CAD; DNS	MAL	KNO	SNE	BHGP	CAD	CRO	SIL	OUL	19th	23
