= Gabriele Debbia =

Italian motorcycle racer (born 1968)

- Nationality: Italian
Motorcycle racing career statistics
Grand Prix motorcycle racing
Active years	1989 - 1997
First race	1989 125cc Dutch TT
Last race	1997 125cc City of Imola Grand Prix
Starts / Wins / Podiums / Poles / F. laps / Points; 87 / 0 / 0 / 0 / 0

Gabriele Debbia (born 20 January 1968 in Sassuolo) is an Italian former Grand Prix motorcycle road racer. His best year was in 1991 when he finished in fourth place in the 125cc world championship.

== Career statistics ==
=== CIV Championship (Campionato Italiano Velocita) ===
==== Races by year ====
(key) (Races in bold indicate pole position; races in italics indicate fastest lap)

Year	Class	Bike	1	2	3	4	5	Pos	Pts
2003	125cc	Honda	MIS1	MUG1	MIS1	MUG2; 9	VAL	21st	7

Sporting positions
Preceded by (Italy) Emilio Cuppini	125 cc motorcycle European Champion; 1989	Succeeded by (Spain) Xavier Debón
