= Frédéric Protat =

French motorcycle racer (born 1966)

- Nationality: French
Motorcycle racing career statistics
Grand Prix motorcycle racing
Active years	1989–1997
Team(s)	Honda, Aprilia, Yamaha
Starts / Wins / Podiums / Poles / F. laps / Points; 98

Frédéric Protat (born 17 July 1966) is a French former professional motorcycle racer. He was the 1991 250cc French superbike champion.

Born in Bron, Protat began his career in Grand Prix motorcycle racing in the 1989 season riding an Aprilia in the 250cc class at the 1989 French motorcycle Grand Prix. He later participated with Aprilia again in 1991 in the 250 cc class. Between 1992 and 1994, he took part in championships sometimes with Honda, and sometimes with Aprilia.

1995 saw Protat move up to the 500cc class riding an ROC Yamaha. In 1996, he was the highest ranking privateer in the 500cc class, finishing the season in 15th place. Protat's final season in the 500cc class was in 1997 riding a Honda.

Protat scored 12 points in the 250cc Grand Prix class and 41 points in 500cc category.

In 1998 and 1999, Protat participated in the World Superbike Championship for Ducati.

In 1999, Protat was vice champion of France on a Ducati superbike.

In 2000 and 2001, Protat won the French Superbike Championship on a Ducati Superbike.

In 2002, Protat was vice champion of France on Ducati.

In 2006, Protat won the 24 Hours of Le Mans motorcycle endurance race along with Olivier Four and Daniel Ribalta-Bosch riding a Honda CBR.

== Grand Prix results ==
Year	Cat.	Team	Bike	GP	Vict.	Podiums	Poles	Mtour	Pts	Position
1989	250 cc		Aprilia	2	0	0	0	0		
1991	250 cc		Honda	13	0	0	0	0	4	33
1992	250 cc		Aprilia	13	0	0	0	0		
1993	250 cc		Aprilia	14	0	0	0	0	8	25
1994	250 cc		Honda	14	0	0	0	0		
1995	500 cc		ROC Yamaha	12	0	0	0	0	9	25
1996	500 cc		ROC Yamaha	15	0	0	0	0	32	15
1997	500 cc		Honda	15	0	0	0	0		
