= Sete Gibernau =

Spanish motorcycle racer (born 1972)

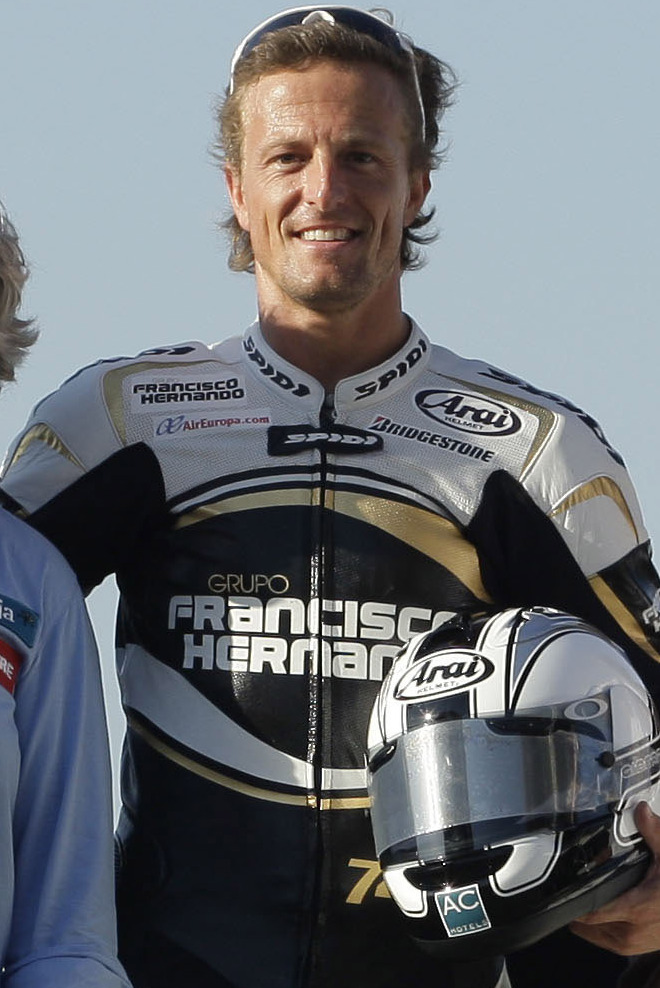
- Gibernau in 2009
- Born: Manuel Gibernau Bultó; 15 December 1972 (age 53); Barcelona, Spain
Motorcycle racing career statistics
MotoGP World Championship
Active years	2002–2006, 2009
Manufacturers	Suzuki (2002); Honda (2003–2005); Ducati (2006, 2009)
Championships	0
2009 championship position	19th (12 pts)
Starts / Wins / Podiums / Poles / F. laps / Points; 83 / 8 / 24 / 12 / 5 / 842
500cc World Championship
Active years	1997–2001
Manufacturers	Yamaha (1997); Honda (1998–2000); Suzuki (2001)
Championships	0
2001 championship position	9th (119 pts)
Starts / Wins / Podiums / Poles / F. laps / Points; 76 / 1 / 6 / 1 / 3 / 484
250cc World Championship
Active years	1992–1996
Manufacturers	Yamaha (1992–1994, 1996); Honda (1995–1996)
Championships	0
1996 championship position	22nd (20 pts)
Starts / Wins / Podiums / Poles / F. laps / Points; 19 / 0 / 0 / 0 / 0 / 20
MotoE World Championship
Active years	2019
Manufacturers	Energica
Championships	0
2019 championship position	11th (38 pts)
Starts / Wins / Podiums / Poles / F. laps / Points; 6 / 0 / 0 / 0 / 0 / 38

Manuel "Sete" Gibernau Bultó (born 15 December 1972) is a Spanish former professional Grand Prix motorcycle road racer who is a 9-time 500cc/MotoGP race winner and a twice overall runner-up in 2003 and 2004. His racing career spans three different eras of motorcycle racing, beginning with the two-stroke-dominated period prior to the 2002 season, and the four-stroke MotoGP era. He returned to racing in 2019 to compete in the electric-powered MotoE World Cup. Gibernau was one of the top riders in Grand Prix racing at the beginning of the MotoGP era.

== Career ==
=== Early career ===
Gibernau is the grandson of Francisco Xavier "Paco" Bultó, the founder of the Spanish Bultaco motorcycle company. He began his competitive careers in observed trials competitions. After trying many different bike categories, in particular those built by his uncle, Gibernau finally turned to road racing in 1990. In 1991, he won the Spanish Juniores 125cc Championship, while in 1992, he competed in the Spanish 125cc Gilera Cup Championship and entered into his first Grand Prix race at the 1992 250cc Spanish Grand Prix.

=== 250cc World Championship ===
==== Yamaha (1992–1994) ====
1992

In 1992, Gibernau participated in his first-ever Grand Prix motorcycle race. In the 250cc class, he participated in the fourth round of the season, the Spanish Grand Prix. He participated as a wildcard rider for the Wayne Rainey Yamaha team and finished in 27th position.

1993

In 1993, Gibernau participated in another race, this time at the last race of the season at the FIM round in Jarama, this time riding for the Kenny Roberts Yamaha team. He failed to finish the race.

1994

In 1994, Gibernau would once again participate in a one-off race, and it would once more be the last round of the season, this time at the European Grand Prix in Catalunya, riding once more for the Kenny Roberts Yamaha team. He finished in 21st place, over a minute behind race winner Max Biaggi.

==== Honda (1995–1996) ====
1995

In 1995, Gibernau once again participated in a one-off race at the same venue as last year, the European Grand Prix in Catalunya. This time, he rode for the Honda Pons team, run by Spanish former world champion Sito Pons. He would not finish the race.

==== Return to Yamaha (1996) ====
1996

Gibernau started his full-time Grand Prix career in 1996, riding a Honda NSR250 for the Axo Honda team. He retired at the opening round in Malaysia, and failed to score any points in the following two races in Indonesia and Japan, finishing 17th and 20th.

At round four in Spain, Gibernau scored his first world championship points with an 11th-place finish. At the Italian GP, he finished 24th and once again failed to score any points.

Gibernau retired in two consecutive races—France and the Netherlands—before finishing in 19th place in Germany, once more outside of the points. At the British round however, Gibernau finished 11th for the second time this season to score points yet again. In Austria, his 18th-place finish meant he finished outside the points yet again, but he recovered well by scoring points for the third time in his rookie season by finishing 14th at the Czech Republic race. In Imola, he finished outside of the points with an 18th-place finish.

With three races left to go, Gibernau was hired by former world champion Wayne Rainey's Yamaha team to replace Tetsuya Harada. He retired from the Catalan round, but finished in eighth place at the penultimate round of the season in Brazil—his highest classification of the season. At the final race in Australia, Gibernau retired for the fifth time this season.

Gibernau finished 22nd in the championship with 20 points, 254 points behind the champion Max Biaggi and 248 points behind runner-up Ralf Waldmann.

=== 500cc World Championship ===
==== Yamaha (1997) ====
1997

After a rollercoaster rookie season in 1996, Gibernau moved up to the 500cc class with the official Team Rainey team for the 1997 season.

In his first ever 500cc race, Gibernau finished in ninth place at the Malaysian round. In Japan, he recorded his first retirement, but bounced back well to score two consecutive ninth-place finishes in Spain and Italy.

At the Austrian race, Gibernau retired for the second time this season. In France, he finished 13th but a 19th-place finish at the next round in the Netherlands meant that he failed to score any points. After Assen, Gibernau went back to scoring points by finishing in 11th at Imola and seventh in Germany—his then highest finish of the year, as well as his career.

The good fortunes would end after the German round for Gibernau, with four consecutive retirements at the Rio de Janeiro, British, Czech Republic and Catalan grands prix. However, he finished the season on a high note by finishing the last two races of the season in the points, by taking eighth in Indonesia and sixth in Australia, beating his best-ever performance in Germany earlier in the season.

Gibernau finished 13th in the championship with 56 points, 284 points behind the champion Mick Doohan and 141 points behind runner-up Tadayuki Okada.

==== Honda (1998–2000) ====
1998

With a good performance in 1997, Gibernau was brought to Honda to replace the unfortunate Takuma Aoki, who became paralysed below the waist after a crash in winter testing, on the privateer Honda NSR500V v-twin motorcycle.

Gibernau started the season off well by finishing in tenth at the opening round in Japan. In Malaysia however, he would retire from the race after an accident, before finishing in the points for the next three races: 12th in Spain, 14th in Italy and 10th in France.

At round six of the season in Madrid, ridden on the Jarama circuit, Gibernau took his first ever podium spot. Despite his bike lacking the power of the four cylinder bikes used by the factory Honda team, he still managed to score a podium place in the form of third place, after fighting hard with Norifumi Abe and fellow Spaniard Carlos Checa, who went on to win the race.

After finishing third in Jarama, Gibernau retired in the next three races held in the Netherlands, Great Britain and Germany, but recovered well and finished inside the top ten at the next three consecutive races—sixth in the Czech Republic, eighth in Imola and fourth in Catalunya. At the penultimate round of the season in Australia, Gibernau would crash out of the race after just two laps and finished the last race of the season in Argentina in ninth.

Gibernau finished 11th in the championship with 72 points, 188 points behind the champion Mick Doohan and 136 points behind runner-up Max Biaggi. Gibernau also teamed up with fellow Honda rider Alex Barros to finish second in the prestigious Suzuka 8 Hours endurance race held in Japan.

1999

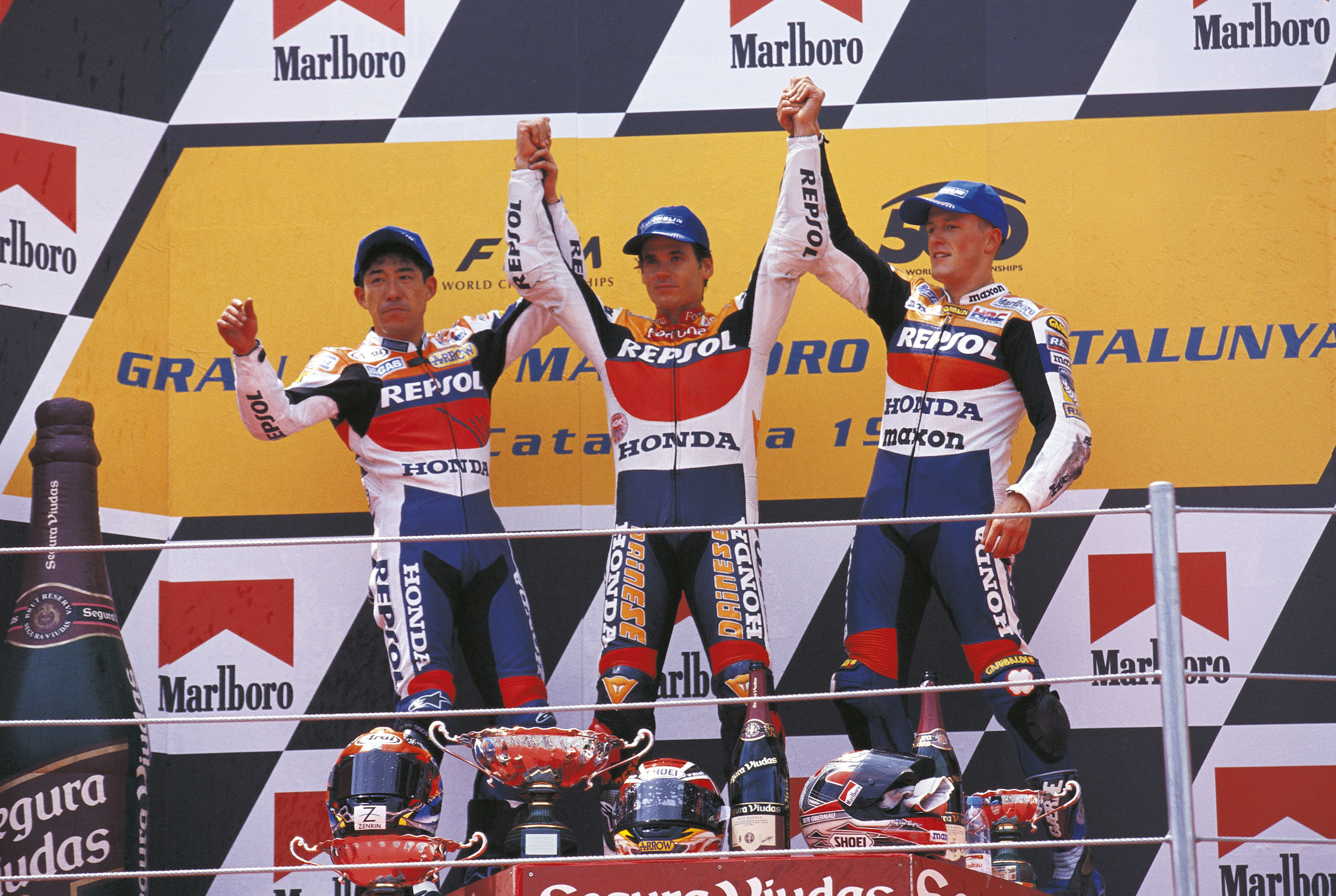
Gibernau (pictured on the right) celebrating on the podium after finishing third at the 1999 Catalan Grand Prix.

In 1999, Gibernau remained with the Repsol Honda team and started off on the Honda NSR500V.

At the opening round in Malaysia, Gibernau would start his season off in good form by finishing tenth at the new Sepang circuit. At the next race in Japan, he improved his result, finishing in fifth place.

When five-time 500cc world champion Mick Doohan broke his leg in several places, but also his collarbone and wrist when he crashed during a very wet qualifying session at the Spanish Grand Prix. Gibernau replaced him from this round onwards when Doohan subsequently announced his retirement.

Now competing with the top-tier Honda NSR500 four cylinder race bike, he took full advantage and immediately scored his first third-place podium at only his third round of the season in Spain. He continued this good run by finishing just off the podium in fourth at the next round in France and sixth in Italy.

Gibernau continued to impress when he took his first ever fastest lap and scored his second podium of the season in Catalunya and then repeated the feat at the next round in the Netherlands, finishing both races in third position and making this his first ever back-to-back podium finish streak. After his great run of results, Gibernau did not participate in the British round.

After his DNS in Donington Park, Gibernau scored another consistent set of points in the following five races—ninth in Germany, tenth in the Czech Republic and Imola, ninth again in Valencia and sixth in Australia. Sixth was also the time Gibernau qualified at the Phillip Island circuit on Saturday.

Gibernau's best result of the season came at the inaugural South African race. On Saturday, Gibernau qualified within the top five by finishing fourth and third in the first and second qualifying sessions. On Sunday, he rode a strong race to finish ahead of championship contenders Àlex Crivillé and Tadayuki Okada and finish in second place behind race winner Max Biaggi. He also picked up his-second fastest lap of his career.

After finishing second at Welkom, Gibernau qualified in second on Saturday at the penultimate round in Rio de Janeiro. On Sunday, he struggled and lost to Biaggi, title contender Kenny Roberts Jr. and Alex Barros to finish fifth. At the final round of the season in Argentina, Gibernau qualified outside of the top ten on Saturday but recovered well to finish sixth on Sunday.

Gibernau finished fifth in the championship with 165 points, 102 points behind the champion and Repsol Honda teammate Àlex Crivillé and 55 points behind runner-up Kenny Roberts Jr.

2000

After a strong 1999 season, expectations for Gibernau to perform better were high in 2000.

Initially, he started off well when he took his first ever pole position at the season opener in South Africa on Saturday, beating 1999 runner-up Kenny Roberts Jr. and champion and fellow Repsol Honda teammate Àlex Crivillé in the process. However, Gibernau would retire from the race on Sunday which was won by the Australian Garry McCoy. In Malaysia, Gibernau would perform better. He qualified outside of the top 10 on Saturday but bounced back on Sunday to finish in a respectable seventh position, scoring his first points of the year.

However, bad luck would continue to plague Gibernau at the next two rounds. He crashed out of the Japanese GP and did the same in Spain. This was his first back-to-back double DNF since 1998. After the bad results in Suzuka and Jerez, Gibernau went on to score points again at the French and Italian rounds when he finished 15th and 10th.

At round seven in Catalunya, Gibernau retired for the fourth consecutive time this season. On Saturday, in tenth position, he barely qualified. but would crash out of the race once again on Sunday on a wet and slippery track. At the next four races, things would improve for Gibernau. He finished seventh in the Netherlands, eighth in Great Britain and Germany and sixth in the Czech Republic.

At the inaugural GP in Portugal, Gibernau retired for the fifth time this season when he crashed out of the race. In the next three races, Gibernau would again bounce back from bad fortunes. At the Valencian Community round, he qualified ninth on Saturday and finished eighth on Sunday. In Rio de Janeiro, Gibernau finished seventh and at the inaugural Pacific Grand Prix, he finished 12th. At the final round of the season—the Australian race—Gibernau retired for the sixth time this season when he stopped in the pits.

Gibernau finished 15th in the championship with 72 points, 186 points behind the champion Kenny Roberts Jr. and 137 points behind runner-up Valentino Rossi.

After the disappointing and struggling season Gibernau had in 2000, the Repsol Honda team decided to drop both Tadayuki Okada and him, to which he signed with the factory Suzuki MotoGP team for the 2001 season, replacing Nobuatsu Aoki.

==== Suzuki (2001) ====
2001

After his switch from Honda to Suzuki, Gibernau continued to struggle with the underperforming RGV500 machine compared to the stronger Honda and Yamaha bikes.

At the opening round in Japan, Gibernau retired after crashing out of the race. After his misfortunes in Suzuka, Gibernau consistently finished in the points on the next nine GPs—tenth in South Africa and Spain, ninth in France, sixth in Italy, fifth in Catalunya, ninth on Saturday qualifying and seventh on Sunday in the Netherlands, 11th in Great Britain, tenth in Germany and eighth in the Czech Republic.

At the Portuguese round, Gibernau retired for the second time this season. When Norifumi Abe crashed, he collected Àlex Crivillé, Alex Barros and Gibernau in the process. However, Gibernau would surprise everyone when he won the Valencian Community race. Before the start of the Grand Prix, rain made the track very wet, but once the rain stopped and temperatures started to increase again, the circuit started to dry up. However, the race direction declared the race to be a "wet race", meaning that the race would not be stopped in the event of more rain. With the track drying up, there would be a big chance that the circuit would eventually be too dry for wet tyres. Initially, all the riders opted to use the wet tyres, but Gibernau chose to use the slick tyres instead, as did his teammate Kenny Roberts Jr. and several others. As the race went on, Rossi—who had built up a commanding four-second lead at one point—was quickly swallowed up as his gamble to use the wet tyres did not pay off and was overtaken by Gibernau, Roberts and Alex Barros, who was riding with an intermediate front and a slick rear tyre. Both Gibernau and Barros battled hard for the lead of the race, Gibernau taking the lead from Rossi on lap eight and holding it until Barros pushed past on lap 13. The Spaniard and the Brazilian swapped places on multiple occasions on lap 20, until Sete made the best use of his slick tyres on a drying track and ducked underneath Barros on lap 29 to retake the lead for the final time. Barros, whose intermediate front tyre was completely ruined, was all over the back of Gibernau on the final lap of the race but could not overtake him, allowing Gibernau to win his first ever 500cc race in front of more than 120.000 Spanish fans. He also scored his third fastest lap of his career.

After scoring his first ever win, Gibernau continued to score consistent points in the final four rounds of the season—ninth in the Pacific and Australia, eighth in Malaysia and 12th at the final race in Rio de Janeiro.

Gibernau finished ninth in the championship with 119 points, 206 points behind the champion Valentino Rossi and 100 points behind runner-up Max Biaggi.

=== MotoGP World Championship ===
==== Suzuki (2002) ====
2002

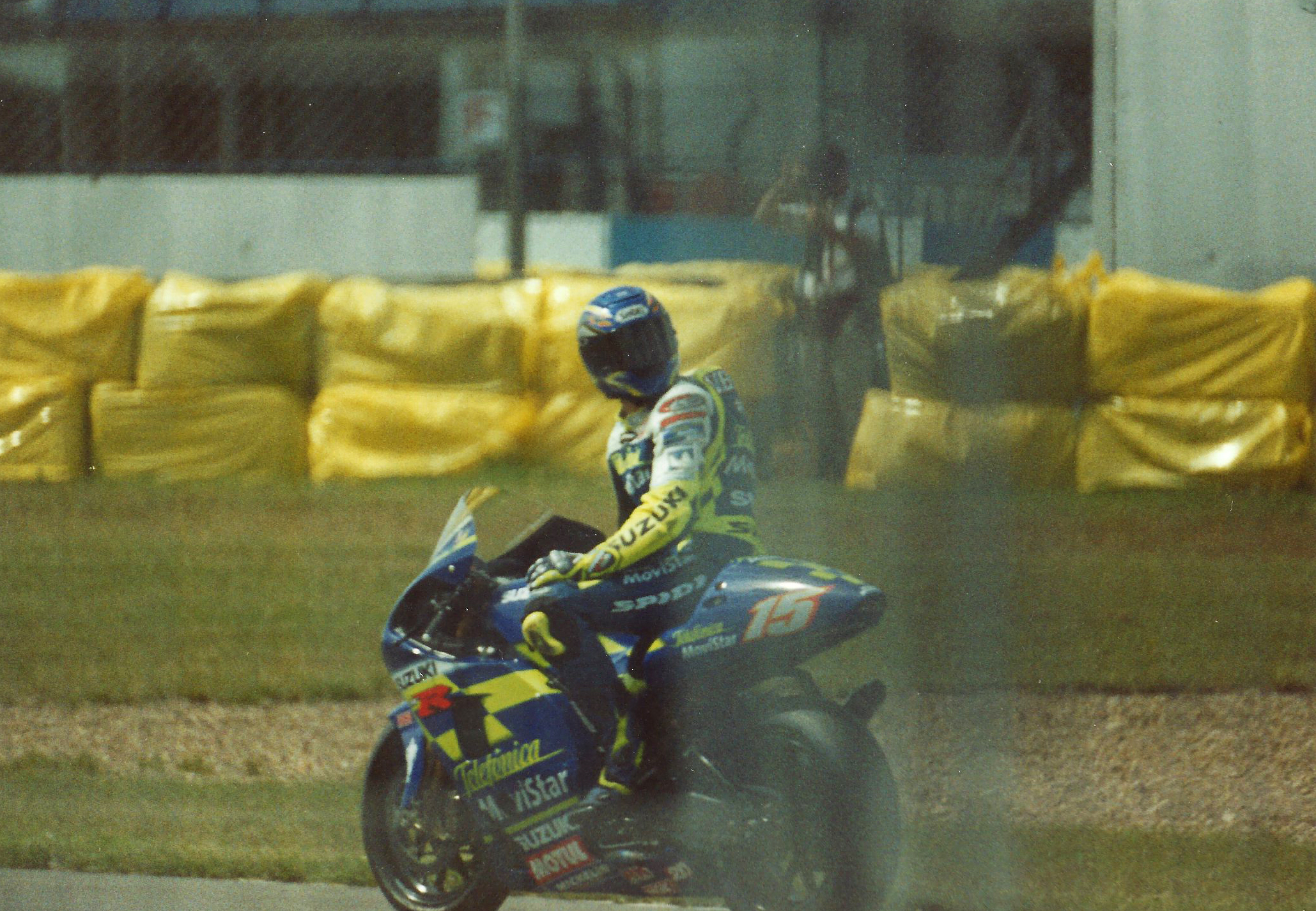
Gibernau at the 2002 British Grand Prix.

The 2002 season would mark the beginning of the MotoGP era as, rule-changes instituted by the F.I.M. saw the introduction of four-stroke machines of up to 990 cubic centimeters in engine capacity. Suzuki's new GSV-R would lag behind those of its competitors with only Akira Ryo taking a podium at the season opening race in Japan.

Despite starting strong, setting multiple fastest laps and climbing up to third position, he lost the front end of his bike and crashed out of contention on lap 12. At the following round in South Africa, he finished in 16th place and failed to score any points since the 1997 Dutch TT in his 250cc days. Gibernau initially started well, moving up from tenth to fifth on the opening lap after a great start, but a trip into the gravel made him lose a lot of time, as well as various positions which he never managed to recover. At the next two races in Spain and France, Gibernau finished in the points for the first time by finishing in ninth and 12th position.

In Italy, Catalunya and the Netherlands, Gibernau suffered three consecutive retirements. In Catalunya, he crashed out of the race at turn one when he had just started his sixth lap. He was in fifth position at the time, ahead of his teammate Roberts. In Assen, Gibernau crashed out of the race at the final right-left chicanes in the final sector. At the British round, Gibernau went back to scoring points when he finished in sixth place, but retired once again at the German round when he crashed out. He achieved his best result of the season when he took fourth place at the Czech Republic GP.

Gibernau came very close to his first victory of the season in Portugal. In the morning, heavy rain soaked the Estoril track for all of the three classes. Gibernau had only qualified ninth on Saturday, but knew his underpowered Suzuki GSV-R had a fighting chance in the rain. When the red lights went out on Sunday, he shot up from ninth to first on the opening lap after a great start, with Rossi, Roberts and Ukawa following him on lap four.

With Gibernau becoming more and more comfortable with the conditions, he set fastest lap after fastest lap and increased his gap to 3.5 seconds on lap 10. With Checa—who had fought his way back up to second—and Rossi trying to close the gap (which was nearly six seconds at one point) in the closing stages of the race, Gibernau had begun to pin back his throttle a little bit more at every corner and succeeded to halt the assault of the Honda riders by setting a new fastest lap of his own to keep the gap stable at around five seconds.

With Rossi and Gibernau evenly matched for much of the race, Rossi closed in slowly to get within three seconds of Gibernau but realised that he could not win the race by closing in alone. He decided that the only way for him to win would be to force Gibernau into a mistake, which arrived on lap 25 when the rear of the number #15's factory Suzuki swung round on the entry to the chicane, throwing Gibernau hard onto the tarmac before slowly sliding into the gravel with four laps to go. It looked like he could remount to finish the race, but the fall—combined with his disappointment—meant that he lay motionless in the gravel. Rossi went on to win the race, with Checa second and Ukawa in third.

At the following round in Rio de Janeiro, Gibernau went on to score points again by finishing in eighth place, before he retired for the seventh time this season at the Pacific GP, this time due to engine issues when the exhaust of his factory Suzuki stopped in a cloud of smoke. Gibernau would finish the last three races of the season on a more positive note, finishing the Malaysian, Australian and Valencian Community rounds in the points—namely 14th, 12th and 13th.

Gibernau finished 16th in the championship with 51 points, 304 points behind the champion Valentino Rossi and 164 points behind runner-up Max Biaggi.

==== Honda (2003–2005) ====
2003

For the 2003 season, Gibernau moved to the Honda Gresini Racing team along with his sponsor Telefónica, riding the five-cylinder Honda RC211V.

At the season-opening round in Japan, Gibernau finished fourth. Tragically, his Japanese teammate Daijiro Kato died on the same race after he collided with the barriers at the Casio Triangle chicane at high speed.

The tragedy seemed to inspire Gibernau. After being given Kato's full works spec bike and riding with Kato's #74 on the bike alongside his traditional #15, Gibernau took his MotoGP pole position on Saturday and won on Sunday in South Africa, holding offValentino Rossi on the last five laps to claim a win in dedication of Kato.

After his win at Welkom, Gibernau's first retirement arrived at the Spanish round. Comfortable in second position, he lost the rear of his bike at turn two on lap eight and slid into the gravel trap. He was so upset that he almost had to be carried from the gravel trap in the process.

After the disappointment in Jerez, Gibernau won his second race of the season in France. The race started off dry initially but was stopped due to sudden heavy which had started to fall on the start/finish straight on lap fifteen, with Valentino Rossi holding a three-second lead over Alex Barros, Tohru Ukawa, Max Biaggi and Gibernau. The race was restarted twenty minutes later for 13 laps with the grid order determined by the running order after the suspension (Rossi, Barros, Ukawa, Biaggi, Gibernau, Haga and Melandri). With the rain stopping short after and confusion reigning supreme, all the frontrunners bar Biaggi chose a full-wet setup for this period of the race.

With Biaggi and Ukawa going into the pits before the race restarted due to a bad tyre choice and suspension problems, Gibernau moved up from fifth to third before the restart even took place. As the lights went out, Barros overtook Rossi on the first lap of the restarted race, with Gibernau doing likewise on lap two, demoting Rossi to third whilst the trio pulled away from fourth place Noriyuki Haga at around four seconds per lap. Rossi and Gibernau traded second place on a few occasions with five laps to go, with Gibernau surprising leader Barros on lap nine by overtaking him before the braking area to move up into the lead, with Rossi doing likewise on the final turn to move up into second place. On the penultimate lap, Rossi then overtook Gibernau on the same section - the final two corners of the circuit - where he overtook Barros a lap earlier, but Gibernau replied by tucking in right behind Rossi and overtaking him midway on the final lap. Rossi immediately responded with an outbraking maneuver but ran wide, allowing Gibernau to retake the position. Rossi slotted behind Gibernau to try a final overtake attempt at the last two corners of the circuit, but when Rossi ran wide whilst trying to make the corners whilst also trying to overtake Gibernau and failed to stick to the racing line, Gibernau managed to get a slightly better exit to trail Rossi's Factory Honda by just +0.165 seconds to the line and win the race. After the race, Gibernau thanked Rossi and Barros for the great, clean racing during the interviews.

At the following round in Italy, Gibernau finished a lowly seventh place but bounced back in Catalunya to take third place, despite losing out on second after a late-charging Rossi overtook him on the penultimate lap.

At the Dutch round, Sete took his first dominant win and third overall win of the season when he launched from his second row start to overtake both Rossi and Biaggi to take the lead through the old, fast turn one kink. Confusion reigned supreme before the race had even started, due to the post warm-up downpour and the track drying up not long after, forcing the riders to gamble on their tyres and set-ups. Not long before the start of the race however, the race was declared 'dry', meaning that, in the event of more rain, the race would be stopped and restarted. As the riders made their way around the start/finish line on the formation lap, it started to rain once more, delaying the start for twenty minutes and now declaring the race as 'wet', meaning that all the riders had to start on a wet weather set-up.

When the lights went out and Gibernau overtook the battling duo of Rossi and Biaggi at the start, both Gibernau and Biaggi left the rest of the pack behind as they had a better pace, overtaking each other for the lead on a few occasions and setting new lap records with each passing lap. Biaggi led the race at the start of lap four, but Gibernau made his move on the run-up to turn one, briefly making contact before Biaggi let Gibernau through into the lead. Exactly at the halfway point of the race, both riders (who were just 0.500 seconds apart) had to deal with backmarkers. Gibernau managed to overtake the Kawasaki of Garry McCoy but Biaggi had troubles with McCoy nearly high-siding off his bike whilst trying to make way for the "Roman Emperor". Biaggi would make up some of the lost time, but by lap eleven Gibernau started to pull a real gap, being two seconds faster than anyone else on the track. Eventually, Gibernau crossed the line +10.111 ahead of second place Biaggi to score yet another win for his team. He also took his first-ever fastest lap in the MotoGP class.

Gibernau's good form continued when he finished second in Great Britain and won his fourth race of the season in Germany. On Saturday, Gibernau only managed to qualify in fifth place, but come race day he moved up one spot on the opening lap. Not long after, Gibernau also passed the Ducati's of Troy Bayliss and Loris Capirossi and went on the hunt to catch race leader Rossi, closing the 2.5-second gap with each passing lap. After staying behind and studying his moves, Gibernau made a pass on lap twenty for the lead. With Rossi seemingly wanting him to lead, he let him through, only to then shadow him in the following laps and make almost continuous dummy overtaking maneuvers to unsettle Gibernau. This game of cat-and-mouse continued until the penultimate lap, when Gibernau tried to escape, but Rossi responded by staying close to him, beginning the last lap with just 0.23 seconds separating the two. Gibernau was leading for most of the lap, until Rossi tried to outbrake Gibernau on the downhill left-hander and took a defensive line into the final turn, but the bike unsettled a bit whilst doing so. In contrast, Gibernau took a wider line on the outside of the corner, using all of the apex and cutting back to the inside of Rossi, with the pair racing uphill to the finish line, the two crossing the finish line neck and neck but with Gibernau winning the race by just +0.060 seconds due to a slightly better exit from the final corner. Gibernau called this "one of the best races of my life".

After his win at the Sachsenring, Gibernau achieved a string of second and fourth-place results. He finished second in the Czech Republic, losing out on victory by just +0.042 seconds after another fierce last-lap battle - similar to the one in Germany - with Valentino Rossi, fourth in Portugal, narrowly losing out on third place, second again in Rio de Janeiro, fourth again in the Pacific, second once again in Malaysia, fourth once again in Australia and finally second once more at the final race of the season in Valencia, battling with Rossi throughout the race once more.

Gibernau finished second in the championship with 277 points, 80 points behind the champion Valentino Rossi. Gibernau won four races, took five second-place finishes and one third-place finish. Rossi has described 2003 in his career as "the year of Gibernau, it was hard until the end."

2004

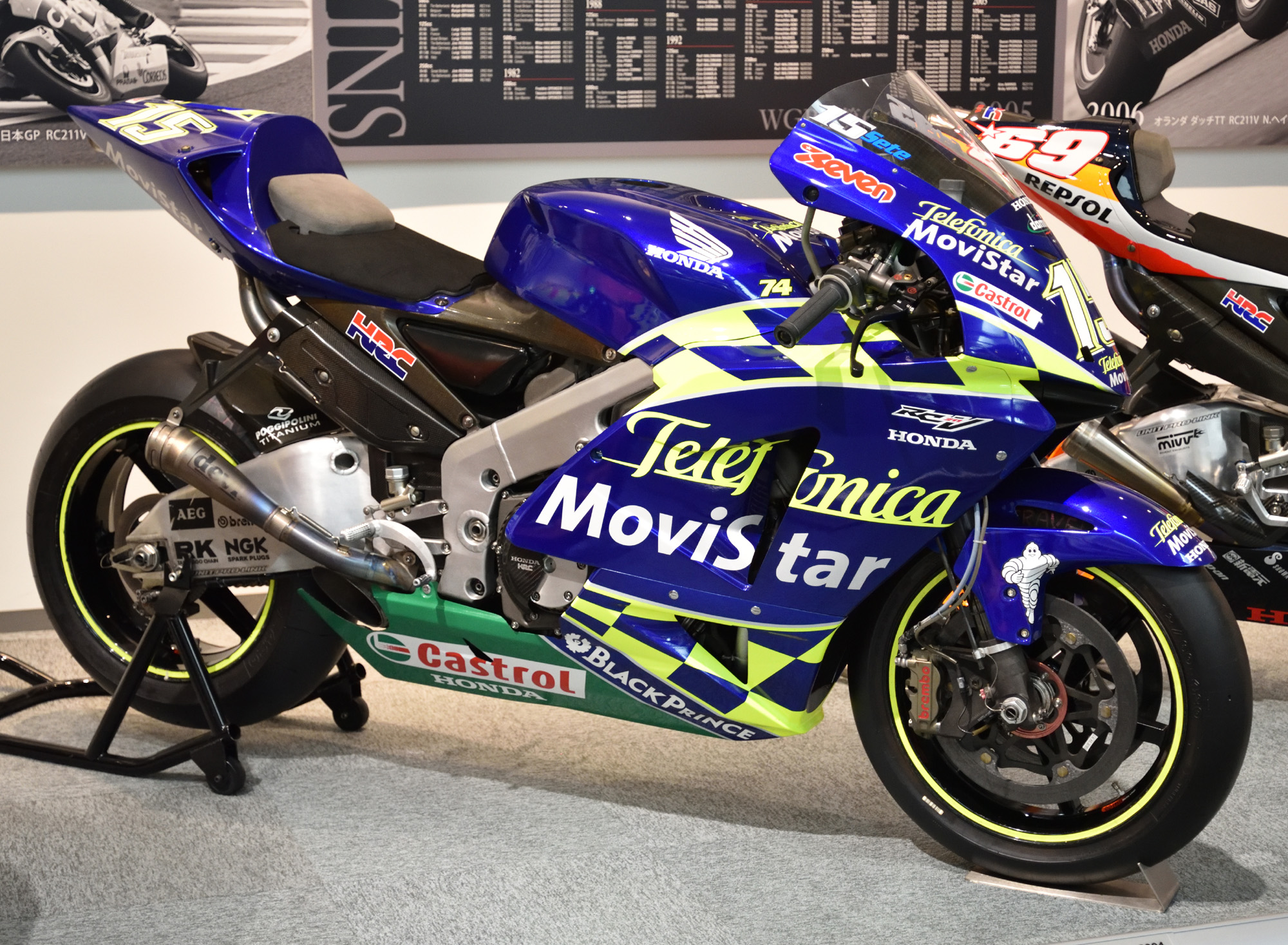
The Honda RC211V used by Gibernau in the 2004 season.

There was much anticipation surrounding the 2004 championship as Valentino Rossi had made a shock move to the Factory Yamaha team and, Gibernau's preseason and early season speed would indicate he was in a good position to win the title.

With the traditional first race of the season at Suzuka off the list due to safety considerations following the fatal accident of Daijiro Kato, the 2004 season started at Welkom in South Africa. On Saturday, Gibernau qualified in second place - just 0.035 seconds behind Rossi - and ended the race in a distant third place after Valentino Rossi and Max Biaggi had a fierce battle for the win.

At round two of the season in Spain, Gibernau took his first win of the year in a wet-weather race. Having qualified his Gresini Honda in second place behind Rossi on Saturday, Gibernau - along with Biaggi - would pass a quickly fading Rossi, who had a lack of pace on the wet Jerez track. Around the halfway point, Biaggi - who was shadowing Gibernau since the first lap - passed him for the lead, only to run wide and hand the position back to the Spaniard one lap later. After his mistake, Biaggi continued to follow Gibernau as the pair rode away from third place Alex Barros, building up a 27-second lead with eight laps to go. With five laps to go, Gibernau upped the pace and created one-second gap. Biaggi tried to respond but when the last lap started, the gap had increased to two seconds. Gibernau crossed the line +5.452 seconds ahead of Biaggi to score an emotional home victory. He also scored his first fastest lap of the season.

One round later, at the French round, Gibernau scored his first ever back-to-back victory after conquering his first pole position of the year on Saturday by just 0.150 seconds over Carlos Checa, despite not being at his best due to a fever. On Sunday, Checa overtook Gibernau at the start and led from the opening lap until lap twelve, when Gibernau passed Checa after he ran slightly wide on a long right-hander. He then pulled a 0.800 second gap to Checa, who was coming under pressure from Max Biaggi as he closed in with ten laps to go. Gibernau never came under threat from Checa and crossed the line +1.671 clear to score his second win of the season.

In the next three races, Gibernau would narrowly miss out on the victory three consecutive times when Rossi beat him on the final lap. In Italy, Gibernau took his second consecutive pole position on Saturday, beating Nicky Hayden with 0.369 seconds. On Sunday, the race was red-flagged after seventeen laps due to rain. Before the race was red-flagged, the battle for first place was going on between Rossi, Makoto Tamada, Gibernau and Biaggi. The race was later restarted for the remaining six laps, with the grid determined by the running order before the suspension. With the track drying, but with substantial rain at turn one, Rossi had built up a one-second lead over Gibernau heading into the last lap, and though Gibernau tried to close the gap, he could not prevent Rossi from winning the race 0.361 seconds ahead.

In Catalunya, Gibernau took his third consecutive pole on Saturday, 0.363 seconds ahead of Rossi. On Sunday, Gibernau started off well and led for much of the race, but couldn't prevent a hard-charging Rossi - whose Yamaha had less tyre and grip problems than Gibernau's Honda - from taking first place with two laps to go to win the race with a narrow 0.159 second margin. Rossi's win meant that he had reduced his gap with Gibernau to only five points in the standings.

In the Netherlands, Gibernau missed another potential pole position when his clutch broke on his final qualifying run and he couldn't fully open the throttle on Saturday, gifting pole to Rossi instead by 0.682 seconds. On Sunday, Gibernau and Rossi dominated the top positions after briefly disposing of a well-starting Carlos Checa until lap ten, when Alex Barros Repsol Honda caught the pair and surprised Rossi by overtaking him on the start/finish straight, only to fall a lap later when an apparent mechanical failure locked up his rear wheel on the entry to a high-speed right-hander, handing the battle for the race win back to the Spaniard and the Italian. Gibernau then led right to the last lap, but Rossi was shadowing him ever since and - after being prevented by a clever change of racing line from Gibernau along the back straight - Rossi made his move by going up the inside at the Strubben hairpin. Gibernau tried to stick it around the outside and the two would ride alongside each other to the next turn, where they made contact. Givernau's front wheel hit the rear of Rossi's bike and broke Gibernau's front fender, unsettling Gibernau in the process. All this allowed Rossi to gain some vital space and he was able to cross the line +0.456 seconds ahead of Gibernau. After the race, Rossi commented that he saw that "Sete is a little angry".

At the following two rounds, Gibernau registered two consecutive retirements. Gibernau and Rossi were level on points, and Gibernau had the edge on Rossi for most of the weekend at the Rio de Janeiro race. Despite Kenny Roberts, Jr. taking the pole position on Saturday, Gibernau showed formidable race speed. On Sunday, despite making a poor start, Gibernau was in the leading group of riders and had just passed Rossi when his Honda's front end slid out from underneath him on lap two and crashed out from sixth place. Rossi, seeking to capitalise, pushed harder but he too then crashed out at the very same corner as Gibernau only a few laps later.

Gibernau again crashed out in Germany when he lost the front of his Honda RC211V on lap nine, this time Rossi stayed aboard but, could only manage fourth, moving 13 points ahead of Gibernau in the championship.

At the British round, Gibernau finished in third position. With Rossi starting on pole but being swamped by the Factory Ducati of Loris Capirossi and the Gresini Honda of Gibernau, he was demoted to third on the opening lap. He bounced back however by re-overtaking Gibernau at the Melbourne hairpin turn 10 and then Capirossi for the lead at the Foggy chicane on lap two. Edwards meanwhile, was moving up the field, overtaking the Ducati's of Troy Bayliss and Capirossi on lap three, then closing in on teammate Gibernau and passing him for second place on lap five. Gibernau was +0.400 seconds behind Edwards but couldn't do anything about the ever-increasing gap he pulled as the race went on. Gibernau crossed the line +4.426 seconds behind race winner Rossi. This third place however meant that Gibernau was now 22 points behind Rossi in the standings, with seven races to go.

In the Czech Republic, Gibernau won his third race of the season. On Saturday, he took pole position in a rain-affected final qualifying session, beating Barros and Rossi for the top spot. When the lights went out on Sunday, Gibernau briefly battled with Bayliss' Ducati before building a one-second lead that he maintained until lap seven, when a four-man group of Rossi, Biaggi, Barros and Nicky Hayden caught up to him. Gibernau stayed ahead when Barros, Biaggi and Rossi fought with each other over positions, until Barros slid out of contention on lap fifteen, promoting Biaggi and Hayden to third and fourth place respectively. With five laps to go, Rossi tried to overtake Gibernau when he pulled alongside him on the entry to the left hander, but the attack failed when Gibernau held on and let the inside line come to him at the following turn. Rossi then outbraked Gibernau down the inside at the end of the next straight, in which Gibernau responded by cutting across behind Rossi's rear wheel as they entered the first part of the corner, then held a very tight line and accelerated to beat Rossi to the second apex - leaving a long, black line of burning rubber on the tarmac. After this battle, Gibernau pulled away to cross the line +3.514 clear of Rossi, reducing his championship lead to 17 points.

In Portugal, Gibernau narrowly lost out on a third-place podium, finishing fourth whilst Rossi won, and finished in sixth place at the Japanese GP with Rossi finishing second.

At the Qatar race, their previously good-natured rivalry spilled over, as Rossi accused Gibernau of pressuring officials to disqualify his qualifying result for allegedly later tampering with the track patch from which he started, to get better grip off an unusually dusty surface. However, it was Gibernau's team, not Gibernau himself, who had noticed the track alteration and asked race organisers to investigate. The security camera tapes showed Rossi's team tampering with the track, doing extended burnouts on his starting zone which embedded rubber across it and provided better grip. Because of this, race organisers penalised Rossi, as well as Biaggi, and moved them both to the back of the grid. At the start, Gibernau overtook polesitter Carlos Checa into turn one on the opening lap, who then increased the gap to +3.290 seconds by lap eight. On lap six however, Rossi crashed out of contention when he ran wide onto the grass and lost the rear in the process. After Rossi's retirement, Gresini Honda teammate Edwards overtook midway through lap nine and went on to chase Gibernau. By lap thirteen, he was less than two seconds away from Gibernau, who responded by going even quicker and thus stabilising his lead. With four laps to go, Edwards once again tried to close in on Gibernau - closing the gap from 2 to 1.6 seconds in one lap - but Gibernau once again responded by upping the pace to extend the gap to 2 seconds once again. Gibernau crossed the line +1.315 seconds ahead of Colin Edwards to win the inaugural race. Gibernau was now only 14 points behind Rossi in the championship standings with just three races to go. The media reported that Rossi put a curse on his rival after the race, stating that "Gibernau will not win another race". Some in the Spanish and Italian motorcycle racing media called it the "Qatar Curse."

After his controversial win in Losail, Gibernau finished in a lowly seventh at the next round in Malaysia while Rossi went on to win the race. At the penultimate round in Australia, Gibernau finished in second place once more. On Saturday, Gibernau took his fifth pole of the season, beating Rossi by just +0.100 seconds. On Sunday, Sete started well and enjoyed the lead of the race up to lap eighteen, when Rossi overtook him at turn one for the lead. Gibernau then shadowed Rossi for four laps, before overtaking him with five laps to go. Gibernau held on to the lead until the last lap, when Rossi made a move by closing up on the brakes into the fast turn one, before squeezing inside Gibernau at turn two. Gibernau stuck to Rossi's rear wheel and drove alongside when they both approached the Honda hairpin, hitting the brakes hard but it was Rossi who ultimately lost out when his rear wheel skipped across the asphalt, forcing him to run a little wide in the process. That allowed Gibernau to dive underneath and get back into the lead, but Rossi responded by moving on the inside as they accelerated up and over turn nine - the medium-speed Lukey Heights corner - moving into the lead with just a few corners to go. Eventually, Rossi crossed the line +0.097 seconds ahead of Gibernau to win the 2004 world championship in his first year on the Factory Yamaha, with Gibernau finishing in second place. While Rossi celebrated, Gibernau was visibly disgruntled in parc fermé for losing out on the title for the second consecutive year. At the final round of the season in Valencia, Gibernau finished fourth.

Gibernau finished second in the championship with 257 points, 47 points behind the champion Valentino Rossi.

2005

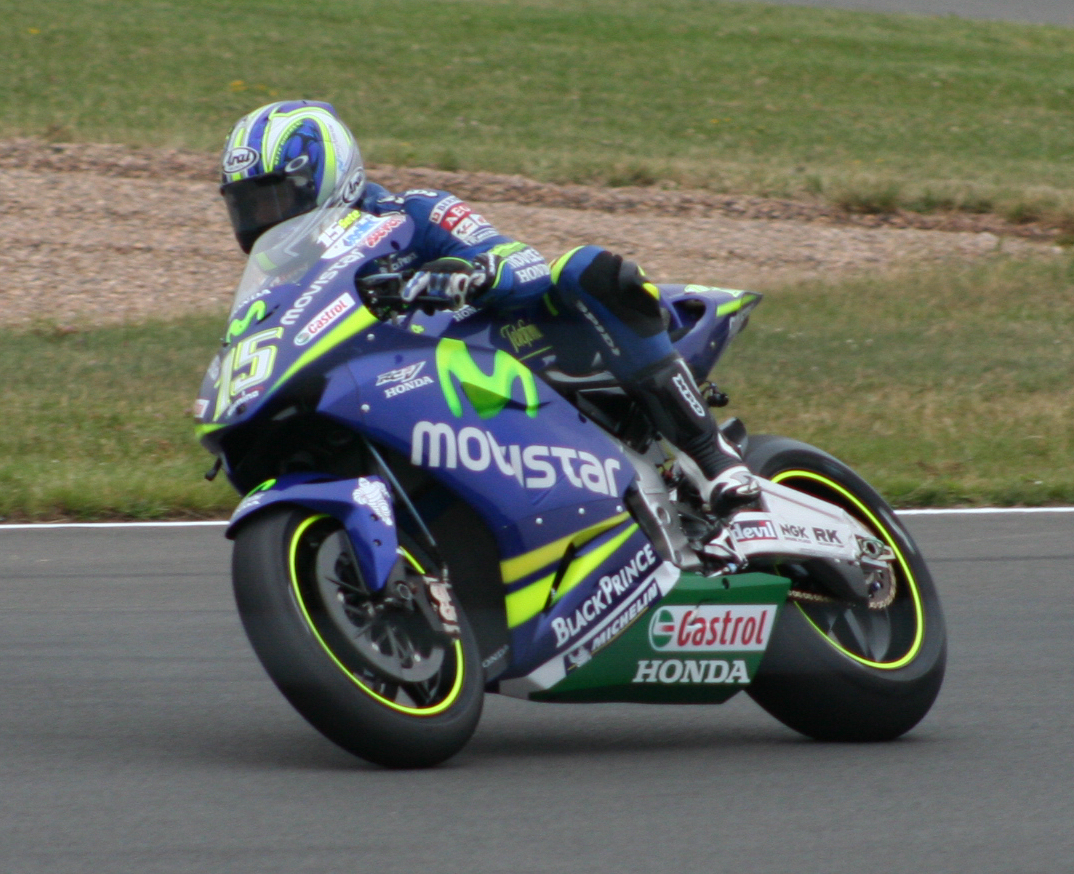
Gibernau at the 2005 British Grand Prix.

In 2005, tensions between Gibernau and Rossi came to a head immediately at the first race in Spain. With Rossi and Gibernau swapping the lead a few times on the opening lap, Gibernau then took the lead and led most of the race with Rossi a close second. On the penultimate lap, Rossi attacked and passed Gibernau to take the lead and then opened a gap on Gibernau. However, Rossi made a mistake and was re-passed by Gibernau with one lap remaining. On the final corner, Rossi made an aggressive pass on Gibernau which broke Gibernau's front fender to take the lead and win the race. During the pass, Gibernau and Rossi came into contact and Gibernau was unable to complete the turn and ran wide into the gravel; he did not fall and was able to continue and finish second. After the incident, Gibernau was furious and refused to comment on the last lap. Rossi commented on the incident, stating that his move had been "hard" but also that "motorbike races sometimes are like this". The pass was controversial amongst observers; some considered it overly aggressive or even dirty racing while others felt it was a brilliant racing move. The Spanish crowd booed and whistled at Rossi as the Italian national anthem was playing. Gibernau was unimpressed with Rossi's move but neither he nor his Gresini team lodged a formal protest.

At round two in Portugal, Gibernau marked his first retirement of the season. After qualifying second on Saturday, Gibernau then took the lead when the lights went out and everyone headed into turn one. Gibernau immediately upped the pace and pulled a +1.700 second gap to second place Max Biaggi. With Alex Barros moving up the field and eventually overtaking Biaggi on lap two for second place, closed down the gap to around one second, before failing to trim it down even more. Around lap eight, white flags were shown to signal the first ever 'flag-to-flag' rain race, meaning that the race would not be stopped and that the riders themselves could decide whether or not to swap bikes. Because the rain was not intense enough to swap bikes, no rider went into the pits to do so. However, on lap sixteen, the rain went from just a few spots to a serious shower at turn one, catching out Gibernau who lost the front of his bike before he even reached the apex. Gibernau tried to continue but failed because his bike went out during the fall, leaving the already injured Gibernau to walk away with his head shaking in disbelief. Barros won the race, with Gibernau now dropping to fifth in the championship standings as a result.

At the inaugural Chinese grand prix, Gibernau took his first pole of the year on Saturday, beating teammate Marco Melandri by +0.163 seconds. On Sunday however, Gibernau knew he was in trouble before the rain-affected race had even begun when he felt his rear tyre vibrating on the warm-up lap. At the start, Gibernau got overtaken by the Factory Suzuki of John Hopkins and teammate Melandri when the vibration kicked in and he was pushed wide. By the end of lap five, he had struggled back to second after Kenny Roberts Jr. had retired and Hopkins had faded. Around the halfway stage, Rossi had increased the gap to Gibernau with about +6.3 seconds, but replacement rider Olivier Jacque was only +0.600 seconds behind him and was closing in fast, setting the fastest laps of the race. Gibernau fought hard to keep him behind, but the tyre problems prevented him from doing so properly and that allowed Jacque to pass Gibernau on lap fourteen. Halfway around the last lap, Melandri took third place from Gibernau, demoting him to fourth at the very end of the race. This meant that Gibernau now slipped to 37 points behind championship leader Valentino Rossi.

In France, Gibernau finished second once more. With the race declared 'wet' minutes before the start, Gibernau went from fourth to seventh on the opening lap, with Rossi losing the lead and ending up sixth as well. While Rossi worked himself up the order, Gibernau stayed seventh for four more laps, then dropped eighth, before making an impressive comeback. He overtook Alex Barros on lap five, Shinya Nakano on lap six, Melandri on lap eight, then overtaking Loris Capirossi and Nicky Hayden for third on lap sixteen. Rossi now realised that Gibernau was moving in fast, he needed to overtake teammate Colin Edwards and use him as a blocker, but with Gibernau being very fast in the wet, he quickly moved in and was right behind Rossi's rear wheel eventually. With Rossi trying to overtake Edwards for the first time - diving cleanly inside - he ran wide which allowed Gibernau to take second place from Rossi in the following corner, blocking an attempt by Rossi to hold the outside line. However, with Edwards still delivering a nearly faultless ride, Gibernau now also was faced with the problem of passing Edwards. His attempts to pass him leaving the door open for Rossi to recover the lost ground and the position, which he did with a sudden pass. With eight laps to go, Edwards made his only real error of the race, allowing Rossi to dive inside the race leader on the first apex of a double right-hander and take first place, causing Gibernau to overtake him as well when the trio went into the second apex. The top two then broke away but Gibernau wasn't able to pass Rossi in the closing laps, his tyres sliding too much on the final lap to do so. Eventually, Gibernau finished +0.382 seconds behind Rossi in second place.

At round five in Italy, Gibernau registered his second DNF of the season. After narrowly losing out on the pole against Rossi by just +0.138 seconds on Saturday, Capirossi took the race lead behind Gibernau when Rossi was demoted to fifth when the lights went out on Sunday. However, when Rossi fought his way back into the lead in just one lap, Gibernau lacked the pace and was overtaken by Rossi on lap one. The top two began to break away from Gibernau, before being overtaken by Biaggi and Capirossi on lap two. Gibernau then lowsided out of contention at a downhill right-hander, retiring from the race in the process.

After his retirement at Mugello, things would improve for Sete at his 'home race' in Catalunya. After taking his second pole of the season on Saturday, beating teammate Melandri by +0.053 seconds, Gibernau retained the lead on the opening lap but with a fast-charing Rossi already up to second - overtaking Capirossi, Hayden, Biaggi and Melandri in one lap - when he dropped from third to sixth on the opening lap. With the front trio trading positions frequently, Gibernau made a mistake when he clipped Melandri's rear wheel under breaking for a tight left hander on lap three, causing him to run wide and lose second to Rossi. On lap five, Rossi and Gibernau forced themselves ahead of Melandri when braking for turn one, then pulling a slight gap to him. On lap six, Gibernau overtook Rossi for the lead on the same spot, holding a +0.400 second gap over Rossi by the halfway point. On lap twentyone, Rossi ran slightly wide at the end of the back straight but soon closed up to Gibernau's rear wheel once again. On the twentythird lap, Rossi finally made a pass after getting a superb exit out of the final turn, tucking into Gibernau's slipstream and then passing the Catalan into turn one. After the overtake, Rossi made the best use of his better tyres and set a fastest lap of the race to pull a gap to Gibernau, who couldn't respond in the last three laps of the race. Rossi won the race +1.094 seconds ahead of Gibernau.

Two lacklustre results would follow at the Dutch and United States rounds, when Gibernau finished fifth twice. At the British round, Gibernau would retire once more. Qualifying second on a dry Saturday, the Sunday race was rain-affected and - after an aborted first start - Giberanau would lead the field when Rossi was demoted to seventh after a poor start with too much wheelspin. Gibernau then set a relentless pace to pull seconds out of the pursuing pack. As the field crossed the start/finish to complete the first lap, Gibernau had already amassed a 2.4 second gap over the five-man pack in pursuit. Rossi moved into the lead when Gibernau - whom Rossi had begun to catch up to after moving up to second on lap three - highsided from his Gresini Honda on lap four. Gibernau was furious and almost saved the rear-end slide before it pitched him off his bike and into the gravel, thus marking his third DNF of the year.

Gibernau would register his final podium position in the MotoGP class at the German GP. Starting second behind Nicky Hayden on Saturday, Gibernau lost two positions as the lights went out. However, after a heavy highside threw John Hopkins off his Factory Suzuki on lap six, the marshalls waved the red flags and restarted the race. At the second start, Gibernau would lose one place and ride behind Rossi in third place, following him when he overtook Hayden at the end of lap two. Sete then overtook Rossi on lap three to hold the lead right up until the last lap, when he missed his breaking point going into turn one, gifting first place to Rossi who would go on to win the race +0.685 ahead of Gibernau, who failed to repass the Italian but managed to stay ahead of Hayden.

In the next three rounds, Gibernau registered three consecutive retirements. In the Czech Republic, Gibernau took pole position ahead of Hayden, Capirossi and Rossi on Saturday. On Sunday, Gibernau converted his pole into a turn one lead when the riders behind him fought for positions. With Rossi emerging as the winner of the fight, he then surprised Gibernau by forcing his way inside him with a tough move to take the lead on the second lap. Gibernau settled into second for the next two laps before repassing Rossi briefly into the final turn - Rossi slipstreaming back into the lead into turn one. Gibernau again fought back and outbraked Rossi into the fast chicane that followed, ultimately taking the lead. On lap twelve, Rossi retook first place when he burst past Gibernau on the brakes into the final chicane, just missing Sete's knee in the process. With a few laps to go, Gibernau eased past Rossi through the last of the downhill turns and quickly built a six-bike-length lead. But it would count for nothing when he ran slightly wide at the penultimate uphill chicane, making him lose his advantage. At the start of the last lap, Rossi made a late dive on Gibernau through the fast left-right switch to retake the lead once more, then pulling a 0.5 second gap to escape Gibernau. Gibernau then tried closing in, until his RCV bobbled and a fuel-supply problem forced Gibernau to retire with just two 'S' bends to go. This retirement saw him slip from third to fifth in the championship standings. In Japan, Gibernau would crash out of the race on lap twelve. In Malaysia, Gibernau was eliminated at the end of lap one when he collided with Shinya Nakano whilst trying to overtake him for third into the final hairpin.

At Qatar Sete led for most of the race, but he finished only fifth after he went off track with five laps to go. At the following two rounds - Australian and Turkish grands prix, Gibernau only scored fifth and fourth place, despite claiming pole at the Turkish race and leading early in the race before going off the track.

At the final round in Valencia, Gibernau took his fifth and final pole of the season when Rossi only managed to qualify in fifteenth place after a high-speed incident on Saturday. On Sunday, Gibernau had a poor getaway and was relegated to fourth as the lights went out, before retaking third from Carlos Checa at the following left-hand hairpin. Afterwards, Melandri, Hayden and Gibernau started to move away from fourth-place Biaggi, until Gibernau's engine broke down in a cloud of white smoke and he was forced to retire on lap four.

Gibernau finished seventh in the championship with 150 points, 217 points behind the champion Valentino Rossi. Despite not winning single race, he won BMW Best Qualifier Award.

==== Ducati (2006) ====
2006

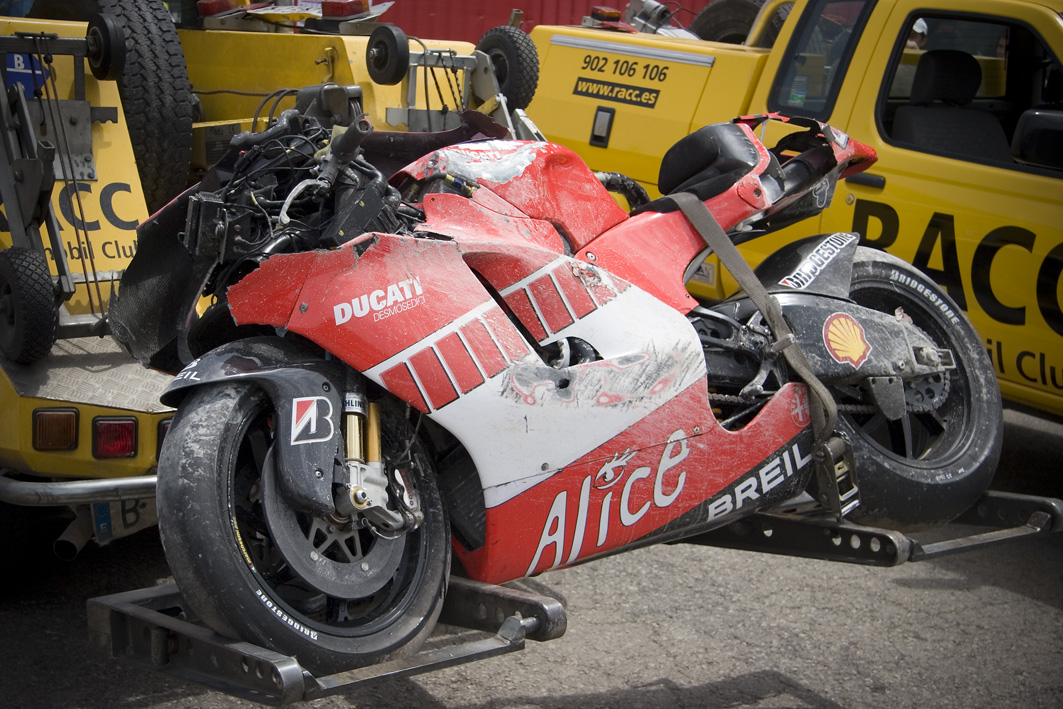
The remains of Gibernau's motorcycle after his crash at the 2006 Catalan Grand Prix.

In 2006, Gibernau joined the Factory Ducati team to replace Carlos Checa, showing impressive speed with the Ducati Desmosedici race bike in pre-season testing.

At the opening round in Spain, Gibernau qualified in a strong second place on Saturday, showing promise that Gibernau would be in contention for the title once more. However, Gibernau retired on lap two when he raised his hand at the exit of a turn to signal mechanical problems - later identified as electronics issues - on Sunday, marking it his first DNF of the season.

At Qatar, Gibernau finished fourth after overtaking rookie Casey Stoner with three laps to go. In Turkey however, he only managed to finish in eleventh place after suffering tyre problems with his Bridgestone compound. In China and France, he only managed to finish ninth and eighth while his more experienced teammate Loris Capirossi finished ahead of him on both occasions - eighth and second.

At the Italian GP, Gibernau took his final MotoGP pole by beating his teammate Capirossi by just +0.089 seconds on Saturday. On Sunday, Gibernau fought hard with Valentino Rossi for the lead on multiple occasions, until he fell back during the race to sixth before eventually crossing the line in fifth place after his left-boot protector fell off during the race and rode with a bleeding left foot.

The seventh round at the Catalunya shaped the rest of Gibernau's season and the rest of his career, in an extraordinary crash described later by race commentators as "Terrifying" and "I have never been so scared in my life, commentating a race". In the crowded first corner, a fast right-hander, Gibernau's teammate Capirossi moved left around traffic across Gibernau's faster line (over 124 mph (198 km/h) at the point of the accident, according to the datalogger) and collected his front brake lever, locking Gibernau's front wheel and flipping his bike end over end. It only narrowly missed landing on the unconscious Gibernau. In the resulting group crash, six riders went into the gravel, five motorcycles were wrecked, three riders were taken to hospital, and race organisers stopped the race. Gibernau's ambulance itself then had an accident on the way to hospital, hitting a bus just 50 metres from the hospital entrance, although he did not suffer any further injury. It was later confirmed that he had concussion and had broken a bone in his hand and re-broken the collar bone broken at Assen, necessitating the removal and replacement of the metal plate.

The accident caused him to miss the next two rounds in the Netherlands and Great Britain, but returned at the Germany where he finished eighth, despite feeling weak beforehand. At the United States round, Gibernau finished tenth. Gibernau missed the Czech Republic round after it was discovered that the titanium plate inserted into Sete Gibernau's broken collarbone had 'weakened' and thus needed surgery to be fixed.

His fitness improved and he returned for the Malaysian round, managing a commendable fifth-place finish. At the following round in Australia, Gibernau led the race for some time after rain forced riders to swap bikes, but a wrong tyre change saw him drop to fourth after Rossi snatched third place from him on the final corner of the last lap.

In Japan, Gibernau finished fourth once more, despite being involved in a late-race collision with the Kawasaki of Shinya Nakano when he tried to overtake him at the downhill right-hand turn, at the end of the back straight.

In the penultimate round of the season in Portugal, he was riding in fifth place when Casey Stoner crashed in front of him, too close to avoid and brought Gibernau down with him. Gibernau suffered a broken fifth metacarpal in his hand and re-bent one of the titanium plates in his collar bone, causing him to miss the Valencian Community race - the final round of the season - due to being unfit to ride as a result of the injuries he sustained.

The Ducati team replaced Gibernau with Casey Stoner for the 2007 season. He turned down offers from Kawasaki, Sito Pons and the Ilmor team and decided to retire from motorcycle racing, saying at a press conference on 8 November 2006, "If I had accepted the offers to continue just for the sake of carrying on then it wouldn't have made me happy, especially if it was just for money."

Gibernau finished thirteenth in the championship with 95 points, 157 points behind the champion Nicky Hayden and 152 points behind runner-up Valentino Rossi.

=== Comeback ===
==== Return to Ducati (2009) ====
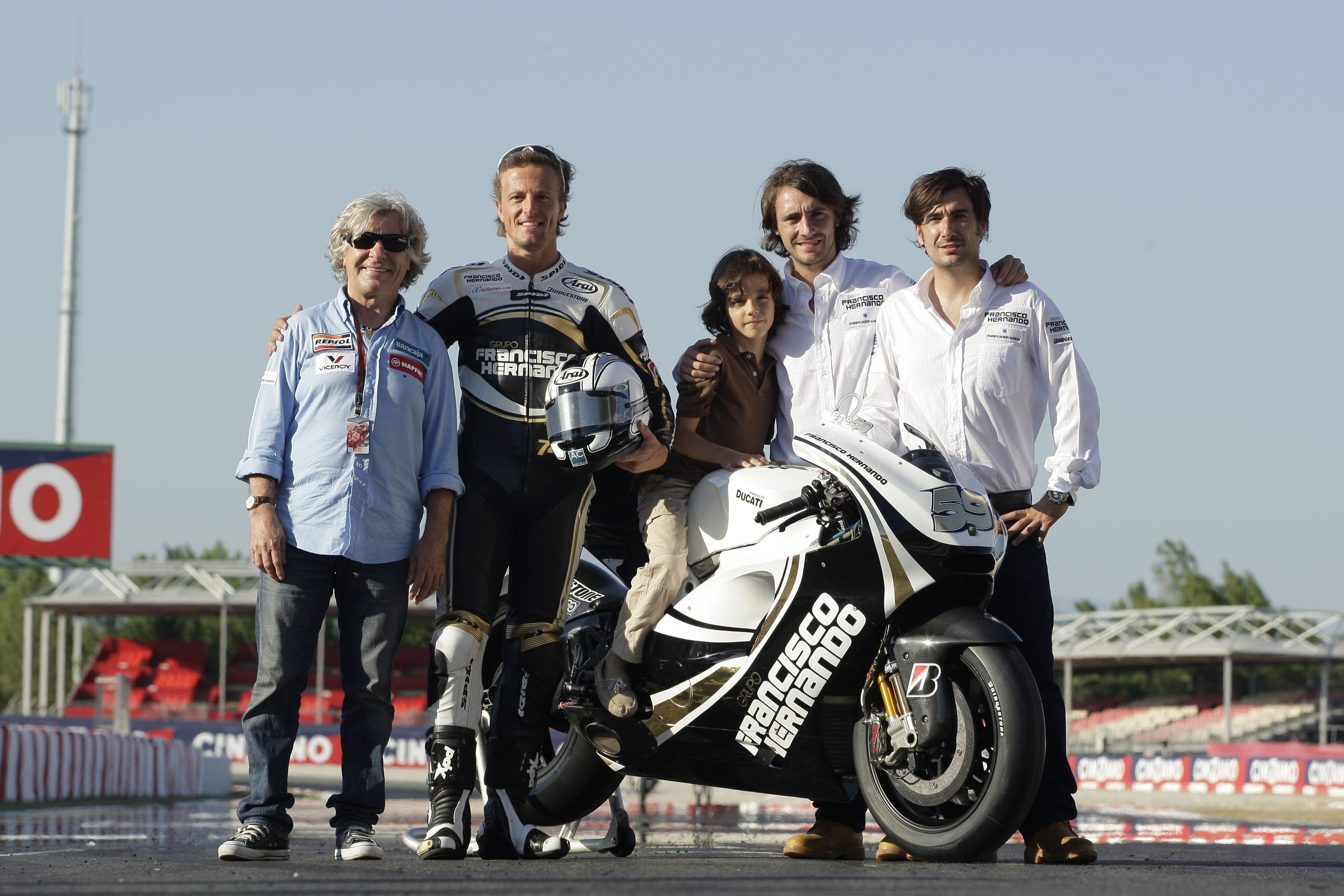
Gibernau with Ángel Nieto before the start of the 2009 Spanish Grand Prix.

Gibernau returned to action on 17 June 2008, testing the Desmosedici GP9 at the Mugello Circuit, in a three-day test session alongside official test rider Vittoriano Guareschi. There was speculation that he could replace the uncompetitive Marco Melandri aboard the second Factory Ducati for the later races in the 2008 season. Despite positive results, Ducati MotoGP Project Director Livio Suppo was unwilling to confirm any definite future for Gibernau with the team. Sete again tested the Desmosedici GP8 and GP9 on a three-day test beginning on 1 July 2008 at the Mugello circuit. He recorded a best time of 1´50.5 on board the GP8 on race tyres, just a few tenths off this year's race record at Mugello set by Casey Stoner. He clocked a 1´48.9 on 30 July at Mugello on qualifying tyres which would have placed him seventh on the starting grid for the 2008 Italian Grand Prix.

After a few months of speculation, on 23 October at Valencia, it was officially confirmed that Gibernau would return to race in the 2009 season with the Onde 2000 team, a Ducati satellite team run by Ángel Nieto. The squad is backed by Onde 2000, a Spanish building concern. With number 15 taken by Alex de Angelis, a new figure has been used for Gibernau's comeback campaign. Gibernau chose 59, in reference to the year in which his grandfather's Bultaco company produced their first bike.

Gibernau began testing for the new team at Valencia. His quickest lap was a 1´34.451 riding the Onde 2000 Ducati GP9, that placed him a modest 14th on the 18-rider timesheets, almost two seconds from fastest man Casey Stoner. At Jerez, in his first official test since return to MotoGP, he ranked ninth among 14 riders, notably faster than Niccolò Canepa on the Alice Ducati and Vittoriano Guareschi on the factory Ducati. Gibernau admitted that, at 35, among the current crop of young MotoGP stars—"I'm going to have to work very hard and I'm ready for that." He admitted he was not back in MotoGP to win races, but rather to enjoy himself on the bike. Gibernau acknowledged the bikes had changed much in the two years he had been absent from the sport. He noted that the Ducati was now very competitive with much potential. "Cornering speed is extremely quick and compared to 2006 there's a lot more electronics. You must trust it almost with your eyes closed, and I still can't do it. I think the rider should do certain things, while instead you must let the bike do it."

Valentino Rossi said he is looking forward to renewing his rivalry with the former foe. “I am sorry I didn't see Sete on the track when we tested in Valencia because I think it's quite a big emotion for us to be together on the track again after all our great battles. I am happy to see him back. We spoke a little bit in the summer when he was thinking about coming back and I'm looking forward to racing him again.”

At the opening round of the season in Qatar, Gibernau finished in thirteenth place, scoring three points. Gibernau then crashed out at the following race in Japan and finished in eleventh in Spain, his best result of the season.

Gibernau missed the French and Italian grands prix due to a broken collarbone he sustained during a practice session at the Bugatti Circuit.

On 4 June, Gibernau confirmed that he would be fit to race at his home track - the Circuit de Catalunya. Upon his return, he finished fifteenth at the Catalan and thirteenth at the Dutch races. At his final race of the season, the United States round, he recorded his second DNF of the season after he crashed out.

On 12 July 2009, the Grupo Francisco Hernando team announced that they would withdraw from the MotoGP championship due to financial constraints, leaving Gibernau without a ride for the remainder of the 2009 season.

Gibernau finished nineteenth in the championship with 12 points, 294 points behind the champion Valentino Rossi and 249 points behind runner-up Jorge Lorenzo.

Valentino Rossi has mentioned Casey Stoner, followed by Gibernau as his hardest rivals ever. Gibernau was known for his wet-weather abilities and was occasionally referred to as "Rainmaster". However, despite his flair, he was all too often let down by an apparently temperamental nature. In-race setbacks could disproportionately affect his competitiveness, both negatively and positively. His career started slowly until he found his motivation and his intermittent flair became consistent. Then he was the principal challenger for Rossi's crown until 2005. The 2006 brought a series of emotional, technical, and injury setbacks, apparently sapping his motivation. It culminated in a major mid-season no-fault racing incident which effectively eliminated him from the championship.

=== Second comeback ===
==== MotoE World Cup (2019) ====
After a decade of retirement, Gibernau made a second comeback when he confirmed he would race in the new electric MotoE World Cup class with the Pons Racing team.

At the inaugural MotoE race in Germany, Gibernau finished in ninth place. At the second round in Austria, Gibernau finished sixth after starting down in twelfth. After the season, Gibernau was not retained for the 2020 season and retired from professional racing for the third time.

== Personal life ==
Presently residing in Switzerland, Gibernau is well-educated, fluently speaking Spanish, Catalan, Italian and English, and some French and German. His hobbies include cycling and water-skiing.

Gibernau's ex-wife is the Spanish supermodel Esther Cañadas. She was always supportive of Gibernau and could often be seen in the pit-garage during races, cheering him on. He formerly rode with a number 15 good-luck charm, but rode with a charm given to him by Cañadas when they became a couple. However, after one year of marriage, they announced their separation in mid-2008.

== Career statistics ==
=== Career highlights ===
- 1990: Debut in the Gilera Cup Championship
- 1991: Junior Champion in the Spanish and Catalan Regional Championship
- 1992: European 250cc Championship
- 1993: 3rd, Spanish 250cc Championship
- 1994: 5th, Spanish 250cc Championship
- 1995: 3rd, Spanish 250cc Championship
- 2005: BMW Best Qualifier Award Winner

=== Grand Prix motorcycle racing ===
==== By season ====
Season	Class	Motorcycle	Team	Race	Win	Podium	Pole	FLap	Pts	Plcd
1992	250cc	Yamaha YZR250		1	0	0	0	0	0	NC
1993	250cc	Yamaha TZ250	Marlboro Team Roberts	1	0	0	0	0	0	NC
1994	250cc	Yamaha		1	0	0	0	0	0	NC
1995	250cc	Honda NSR250	Fortuna Honda Pons	1	0	0	0	0	0	NC
1996	250cc	Honda		12	0	0	0	0	12	22nd
1996	250cc	Yamaha		3	0	0	0	0	8	22nd
1997	500cc	Yamaha YZR500	Yamaha Team Rainey	15	0	0	0	0	56	13th
1998	500cc	Honda NSR500V	Repsol Honda	14	0	1	0	0	72	11th
1999	500cc	Honda NSR500V	Repsol Honda	15	0	4	0	2	165	5th
2000	500cc	Honda NSR500	Repsol YPF Honda Team	16	0	0	1	0	72	15th
2001	500cc	Suzuki RGV500	Telefónica Movistar Suzuki	16	1	1	0	1	119	9th
2002	MotoGP	Suzuki GSV-R	Telefónica Movistar Suzuki	16	0	0	0	0	51	16th
2003	MotoGP	Honda RC211V	Telefónica Movistar Honda	16	4	10	1	1	277	**2nd**
2004	MotoGP	Honda RC211V	Telefónica Movistar Honda MotoGP	16	4	10	5	3	257	**2nd**
2005	MotoGP	Honda RC211V	Movistar Honda MotoGP	17	0	4	5	1	150	7th
2006	MotoGP	Ducati Desmosedici GP6	Ducati Marlboro Team	12	0	0	1	0	95	13th
2009	MotoGP	Ducati Desmosedici GP9	Grupo Francisco Hernando	6	0	0	0	0	12	19th
2019	MotoE	Energica Ego Corsa	Join Contract Pons 40	6	0	0	0	0	38	11th
Total				**184**	**9**	**30**	**13**	**8**	**1384**	

==== By class ====
Class	Seasons	1st GP	1st Pod	1st Win	Race	Win	Podiums	Pole	FLap	Pts
250cc	1992–1996	1992 Spain			19	0	0	0	0	20
500cc	1997–2001	1997 Malaysia	1998 Madrid	2001 Valencia	76	1	6	1	3	484
MotoGP	2002–2006, 2009	2002 Japan	2003 South Africa	2003 South Africa	83	8	24	12	5	842
MotoE	2019	2019 German			6	0	0	0	0	38
Total	1992–2006, 2009, 2019				**184**	**9**	**30**	**13**	**8**	**1384**

==== Races by year ====
Source: (key) (Races in bold indicate pole position, races in italics indicate fastest lap)

Year	Class	Bike	1	2	3	4	5	6	7	8	9	10	11	12	13	14	15	16	17	Pos	Pts
1992	250cc	Yamaha	JPN	AUS	MAL	SPA; 27	ITA	EUR	GER	NED	HUN	FRA	GBR	BRA	RSA					NC	0
1993	250cc	Yamaha	AUS	MAL	JPN	SPA	AUT	GER	NED	EUR	RSM	GBR	CZE	ITA	USA	FIM; Ret				NC	0
1994	250cc	Yamaha	AUS	MAL	JPN	SPA	AUT	GER	NED	ITA	FRA	GBR	CZE	USA	ARG	EUR; 21				NC	0
1995	250cc	Honda	AUS	MAL	JPN	SPA	GER	ITA	NED	FRA	GBR	CZE	BRA	ARG	EUR; Ret					NC	0
1996	250cc	Honda	MAL; Ret	INA; 17	JPN; 20	SPA; 11	ITA; 24	FRA; Ret	NED; Ret	GER; 19	GBR; 11	AUT; 18	CZE; 14	IMO; 18						22nd	20
1996	250cc	Yamaha													CAT; Ret	BRA; 8	AUS; Ret			22nd	20
1997	500cc	Yamaha	MAL; 9	JPN; Ret	SPA; 9	ITA; 9	AUT; Ret	FRA; 13	NED; 19	IMO; 11	GER; 7	BRA; Ret	GBR; Ret	CZE; Ret	CAT; Ret	INA; 8	AUS; 6			13th	56
1998	500cc	Honda	JPN; 10	MAL; Ret	SPA; 12	ITA; 14	FRA; 10	MAD; 3	NED; Ret	GBR; Ret	GER; Ret	CZE; 6	IMO; 8	CAT; 4	AUS; Ret	ARG; 9				11th	72
1999	500cc	Honda	MAL; 10	JPN; 5	SPA; 3	FRA; 4	ITA; 6	CAT; 3	NED; 3	GBR; DNS	GER; 9	CZE; 10	IMO; 10	VAL; 9	AUS; 6	RSA; 2	BRA; 5	ARG; 6		5th	165
2000	500cc	Honda	**RSA**; Ret	MAL; 7	JPN; Ret	SPA; Ret	FRA; 15	ITA; 10	CAT; Ret	NED; 7	GBR; 8	GER; 8	CZE; 6	POR; Ret	VAL; 8	BRA; 7	PAC; 12	AUS; Ret		15th	72
2001	500cc	Suzuki	JPN; Ret	RSA; 10	SPA; 10	FRA; 9	ITA; 6	CAT; 5	NED; 7	GBR; 11	GER; 10	CZE; 8	POR; Ret	VAL; 1	PAC; 9	AUS; 9	MAL; 8	BRA; 12		9th	119
2002	MotoGP	Suzuki	JPN; Ret	RSA; 16	SPA; 9	FRA; 12	ITA; Ret	CAT; Ret	NED; Ret	GBR; 6	GER; Ret	CZE; 4	POR; Ret	BRA; 8	PAC; Ret	MAL; 14	AUS; 12	VAL; 13		16th	51
2003	MotoGP	Honda	JPN; 4	**RSA**; 1	SPA; Ret	FRA; 1	ITA; 7	CAT; 3	NED; 1	GBR; 2	GER; 1	CZE; 2	POR; 4	BRA; 2	PAC; 4	MAL; 2	AUS; 4	VAL; 2		2nd	277
2004	MotoGP	Honda	RSA; 3	SPA; 1	**FRA**; 1	**ITA**; 2	**CAT**; 2	NED; 2	BRA; Ret	GER; Ret	GBR; 3	**CZE**; 1	POR; 4	JPN; 6	QAT; 1	MAL; 7	**AUS**; 2	VAL; 4		2nd	257
2005	MotoGP	Honda	SPA; 2	POR; Ret	**CHN**; 4	FRA; 2	ITA; Ret	**CAT**; 2	NED; 5	USA; 5	GBR; Ret	GER; 2	**CZE**; Ret	JPN; Ret	MAL; Ret	QAT; 5	AUS; 5	**TUR**; 4	**VAL**; Ret	7th	150
2006	MotoGP	Ducati	SPA; Ret	QAT; 4	TUR; 11	CHN; 9	FRA; 8	**ITA**; 5	CAT; DNS	NED	GBR	GER; 8	USA; 10	CZE	MAL; 5	AUS; 4	JPN; 4	POR; Ret	VAL	13th	95
2009	MotoGP	Ducati	QAT; 13	JPN; Ret	SPA; 11	FRA	ITA	CAT; 15	NED; 13	USA; Ret	GER	GBR	CZE	INP	SMR	POR	AUS	MAL	VAL	19th	12
2019	MotoE	Energica	GER; 9	AUT; 6	RSM1; 9	RSM2; Ret	VAL1; 11	VAL2; 7												11th	38
