= 2003 British motorcycle Grand Prix =

(United Kingdom) 2003 British Grand Prix
Race details
- Race 8 of 16 races in the 2003 Grand Prix motorcycle racing season
- Date: July 13 2003
- Official name: Cinzano British Grand Prix
- Location: Donington Park
- Course: Permanent racing facility; 4.023 km (2.500 mi)

MotoGP
Pole position
Rider	(Italy) Max Biaggi	Honda
Time	1:30.740	
Fastest lap
Rider	(Italy) Valentino Rossi	Honda
Time	1:31.023 on lap 2	
Podium
First	(Italy) Max Biaggi	Honda
Second	(Spain) Sete Gibernau	Honda
Third	(Italy) Valentino Rossi	Honda

250cc
Pole position
Rider	(Spain) Fonsi Nieto	Aprilia
Time	1:33.859	
Fastest lap
Rider	(San Marino) Manuel Poggiali	Aprilia
Time	1:34.558 on lap 3	
Podium
First	(Spain) Fonsi Nieto	Aprilia
Second	(San Marino) Manuel Poggiali	Aprilia
Third	(Australia) Anthony West	Aprilia

125cc
Pole position
Rider	(Italy) Stefano Perugini	Aprilia
Time	1:37.984	
Fastest lap
Rider	(Italy) Lucio Cecchinello	Aprilia
Time	1:38.463 on lap 7	
Podium
First	(Spain) Héctor Barberá	Aprilia
Second	(Italy) Andrea Dovizioso	Honda
Third	(Italy) Stefano Perugini	Aprilia

The 2003 British motorcycle Grand Prix was the eighth round of the 2003 MotoGP Championship. It took place on the weekend of 11–13 July 2003 at the Donington Park circuit.

== MotoGP classification ==
Pos.	No.	Rider	Team	Manufacturer	Laps	Time/Retired	Grid	Points
1	3	(Italy) Max Biaggi	Camel Pramac Pons	Honda	30	46:06.688	1	25
2	15	(Spain) Sete Gibernau	Telefónica Movistar Honda	Honda	30	+7.138	2	20
3	46	(Italy) Valentino Rossi	Repsol Honda	Honda	30	+8.794 (Note: 10-second penalty for overtaking under yellow flags.)	4	16
4	65	(Italy) Loris Capirossi	Ducati Marlboro Team	Ducati	30	+13.041	7	13
5	12	(Australia) Troy Bayliss	Ducati Marlboro Team	Ducati	30	+16.269	6	11
6	7	(Spain) Carlos Checa	Fortuna Yamaha Team	Yamaha	30	+27.085	5	10
7	41	(Japan) Noriyuki Haga	Alice Aprilia Racing	Aprilia	30	+27.662	13	9
8	69	(United States) Nicky Hayden	Repsol Honda	Honda	30	+32.012	12	8
9	56	(Japan) Shinya Nakano	d'Antín Yamaha Team	Yamaha	30	+34.799	11	7
10	45	(United States) Colin Edwards	Alice Aprilia Racing	Aprilia	30	+35.001	9	6
11	21	(United States) John Hopkins	Suzuki Grand Prix Team	Suzuki	30	+48.165	14	5
12	71	(Japan) Yukio Kagayama	Suzuki Grand Prix Team	Suzuki	30	+1:00.423	16	4
13	6	(Japan) Makoto Tamada	Pramac Honda	Honda	30	+1:06.160	15	3
14	23	(Japan) Ryuichi Kiyonari	Telefónica Movistar Honda	Honda	30	+1:14.866	19	2
15	9	(Japan) Nobuatsu Aoki	Proton Team KR	Proton KR	30	+1:30.291	21	1
16	8	(Australia) Garry McCoy	Kawasaki Racing Team	Kawasaki	29	+1 lap	17	
17	88	(Australia) Andrew Pitt	Kawasaki Racing Team	Kawasaki	29	+1 lap	20	
Ret	19	(France) Olivier Jacque	Gauloises Yamaha Team	Yamaha	18	Accident	8	
Ret	99	(United Kingdom) Jeremy McWilliams	Proton Team KR	Proton KR	13	Retirement	18	
Ret	52	(Spain) David de Gea	WCM	Sabre V4	9	Retirement	23	
Ret	33	(Italy) Marco Melandri	Fortuna Yamaha Team	Yamaha	4	Accident	3	
Ret	35	(United Kingdom) Chris Burns	WCM	ROC Yamaha	1	Accident	22	
Ret	11	(Japan) Tohru Ukawa	Camel Pramac Pons	Honda	0	Accident	10	
DNS	4	(Brazil) Alex Barros	Gauloises Yamaha Team	Yamaha		Did not start		

== 250 cc classification ==
Pos.	No.	Rider	Manufacturer	Laps	Time/Retired	Grid	Points
1	10	(Spain) Fonsi Nieto	Aprilia	27	42:58.011	1	25
2	54	(San Marino) Manuel Poggiali	Aprilia	27	+0.269	2	20
3	14	(Australia) Anthony West	Aprilia	27	+2.558	10	16
4	24	(Spain) Toni Elías	Aprilia	27	+2.933	3	13
5	3	(Italy) Roberto Rolfo	Honda	27	+2.934	7	11
6	5	(Argentina) Sebastián Porto	Honda	27	+25.030	8	10
7	21	(Italy) Franco Battaini	Aprilia	27	+27.663	6	9
8	7	(France) Randy de Puniet	Aprilia	27	+31.591	5	8
9	8	(Japan) Naoki Matsudo	Yamaha	27	+50.348	4	7
10	6	(Spain) Alex Debón	Honda	27	+53.337	12	6
11	23	(United Kingdom) Jay Vincent	Aprilia	27	+58.098	11	5
12	33	(Spain) Héctor Faubel	Aprilia	27	+1:00.050	16	4
13	57	(United Kingdom) Chaz Davies	Aprilia	27	+1:00.250	17	3
14	96	(Czech Republic) Jakub Smrž	Honda	27	+1:10.355	21	2
15	28	(Germany) Dirk Heidolf	Aprilia	27	+1:11.666	23	1
16	9	(France) Hugo Marchand	Aprilia	27	+1:15.036	19	
17	26	(Italy) Alex Baldolini	Aprilia	27	+1:23.682	20	
18	18	(Netherlands) Henk vd Lagemaat	Honda	26	+1 lap	24	
19	98	(Germany) Katja Poensgen	Honda	26	+1 lap	27	
Ret	11	(Spain) Joan Olivé	Aprilia	19	Accident	18	
Ret	36	(France) Erwan Nigon	Aprilia	19	Retirement	15	
Ret	58	(United Kingdom) Lee Dickinson	Yamaha	12	Retirement	26	
Ret	16	(Sweden) Johan Stigefelt	Aprilia	8	Retirement	14	
Ret	60	(United Kingdom) Phillip Desborough	Yamaha	5	Accident	25	
Ret	34	(France) Eric Bataille	Honda	4	Accident	13	
Ret	15	(Germany) Christian Gemmel	Honda	4	Accident	22	
Ret	50	(France) Sylvain Guintoli	Aprilia	1	Accident	9	
DNQ	59	(United Kingdom) Andrew Sawford	Honda		Did not qualify		
EX	53	(Italy) Teresio Isola	Yamaha		Excluded (Note: Black-flagged and excluded from the remainder of the event after the first qualifying session.)		

== 125 cc classification ==
Pos.	No.	Rider	Manufacturer	Laps	Time/Retired	Grid	Points
1	80	(Spain) Héctor Barberá	Aprilia	25	41:25.907	6	25
2	34	(Italy) Andrea Dovizioso	Honda	25	+0.605	3	20
3	7	(Italy) Stefano Perugini	Aprilia	25	+2.597	1	16
4	15	(San Marino) Alex de Angelis	Aprilia	25	+9.170	10	13
5	27	(Australia) Casey Stoner	Aprilia	25	+11.692	9	11
6	22	(Spain) Pablo Nieto	Aprilia	25	+15.898	11	10
7	36	(Finland) Mika Kallio	Honda	25	+21.004	5	9
8	1	(France) Arnaud Vincent	KTM	25	+21.756	17	8
9	79	(Hungary) Gábor Talmácsi	Aprilia	25	+22.212	15	7
10	4	(Italy) Lucio Cecchinello	Aprilia	25	+23.642	8	6
11	6	(Italy) Mirko Giansanti	Aprilia	25	+23.812	20	5
12	42	(Italy) Gioele Pellino	Aprilia	25	+34.153	16	4
13	8	(Japan) Masao Azuma	Honda	25	+35.552	22	3
14	19	(Spain) Álvaro Bautista	Aprilia	25	+35.873	18	2
15	63	(France) Mike Di Meglio	Aprilia	25	+36.203	26	1
16	58	(Italy) Marco Simoncelli	Aprilia	25	+44.343	24	
17	25	(Hungary) Imre Tóth	Honda	25	+51.520	25	
18	31	(Spain) Julián Simón	Malaguti	25	+1:06.379	30	
19	23	(Italy) Gino Borsoi	Aprilia	25	+1:06.972	12	
20	78	(Hungary) Péter Lénárt	Honda	25	+1:11.783	33	
21	81	(Spain) Ismael Ortega	Aprilia	25	+1:12.473	32	
22	12	(Switzerland) Thomas Lüthi	Honda	25	+1:26.143	13	
23	84	(United Kingdom) Paul Veazey	Honda	24	+1 lap	34	
24	50	(United Kingdom) Midge Smart	Honda	24	+1 lap	36	
25	49	(United Kingdom) Lee Longden	Honda	24	+1 lap	37	
26	83	(United Kingdom) Chester Lusk	Honda	23	+2 laps	38	
Ret	3	(Spain) Daniel Pedrosa	Honda	24	Accident	2	
Ret	26	(Spain) Emilio Alzamora	Derbi	24	Retirement	28	
Ret	10	(Italy) Roberto Locatelli	KTM	22	Retirement	27	
Ret	21	(United Kingdom) Leon Camier	Honda	7	Retirement	31	
Ret	41	(Japan) Youichi Ui	Aprilia	5	Accident	14	
Ret	33	(Italy) Stefano Bianco	Gilera	5	Retirement	29	
Ret	11	(Italy) Max Sabbatani	Aprilia	1	Accident	21	
Ret	48	(Spain) Jorge Lorenzo	Derbi	1	Accident	19	
Ret	32	(Italy) Fabrizio Lai	Malaguti	1	Accident	23	
Ret	17	(Germany) Steve Jenkner	Aprilia	0	Accident	7	
Ret	24	(Italy) Simone Corsi	Honda	0	Accident	4	
DNS	51	(United Kingdom) Kris Weston	Honda	0	Did not start	35	

== Championship standings after the race (MotoGP) ==
Below are the standings for the top five riders and constructors after round eight has concluded.

Riders' Championship standings

Pos.	Rider	Points
1	(Italy) Valentino Rossi	167
2	(Spain) Sete Gibernau	133
3	(Italy) Max Biaggi	130
4	(Italy) Loris Capirossi	84
5	(Australia) Troy Bayliss	64

Constructors' Championship standings

Pos.	Constructor	Points
1	(Japan) Honda	195
2	(Italy) Ducati	113
3	(Japan) Yamaha	93
4	(Italy) Aprilia	52
5	(Japan) Suzuki	22

- Note: Only the top five positions are included for both sets of standings.

== Notes ==
Previous race: 2003 Dutch TT	FIM Grand Prix World Championship; 2003 season	Next race: 2003 German Grand Prix
Previous race: 2002 British Grand Prix	British motorcycle Grand Prix	Next race: 2004 British Grand Prix
