= 2002 German motorcycle Grand Prix =

(Germany) 2002 German Grand Prix
Race details
- Race 9 of 16 races in the 2002 Grand Prix motorcycle racing season
- Date: 21 July 2002
- Official name: Cinzano Motorrad Grand Prix Deutschland
- Location: Sachsenring
- Course: Permanent racing facility; 3.704 km (2.302 mi)

MotoGP
Pole position
Rider	(France) Olivier Jacque	Yamaha
Time	1:25.758	
Fastest lap
Rider	(Italy) Valentino Rossi	Honda
Time	1:26.226 on lap 29	
Podium
First	(Italy) Valentino Rossi	Honda
Second	(Italy) Max Biaggi	Yamaha
Third	(Japan) Tohru Ukawa	Honda

250cc
Pole position
Rider	(Spain) Fonsi Nieto	Aprilia
Time	1:26.874	
Fastest lap
Rider	(Italy) Roberto Rolfo	Honda
Time	1:27.234 on lap 4	
Podium
First	(Italy) Marco Melandri	Aprilia
Second	(Italy) Roberto Rolfo	Honda
Third	(Argentina) Sebastián Porto	Yamaha

125cc
Pole position
Rider	(France) Arnaud Vincent	Aprilia
Time	1:29.097	
Fastest lap
Rider	(Germany) Steve Jenkner	Aprilia
Time	1:29.486 on lap 3	
Podium
First	(France) Arnaud Vincent	Aprilia
Second	(San Marino) Alex de Angelis	Aprilia
Third	(Germany) Steve Jenkner	Aprilia

The 2002 German motorcycle Grand Prix was the ninth round of the 2002 MotoGP Championship. It took place on the weekend of 19–21 July 2002 at the Sachsenring.

== MotoGP race report ==
This race was most notable for the hard-fought battle between the two-and four-strokes all around the circuit, the fight between Barros, Jacque and Ukawa for the win in the early stage and Rossi and Jacque in the second stage of the race.

Valentino Rossi has already built up a solid lead over the rest after eight rounds, leading the title hunt with 195 points. In second is his teammate Tohru Ukawa with 108 points and third is Max Biaggi with 89 points.

On Saturday, Olivier Jacque took pole position on the two-stroke Yamaha with a time of 1:25.758 - his first pole position of 2002 and immediately his last of the season and his career. Second is Shinya Nakano, only being +0.080 seconds behind, then Max Biaggi in third +.0.117 seconds behind and in fourth Alex Barros who is +0.198 seconds behind. On the second row of the grid is Tohru Ukawa in fifth, teammate Valentino Rossi in sixth, Jeremy McWilliams in seventh and Garry McCoy in eighth. Akira Ryō enters as a wildcard for this race, José Luis Cardoso replaces Pere Riba who is still rehabilitating from a fracture on his left tibia after a fall during Saturday practice at the British round, Yukio Kagayama replaces Kenny Roberts Jr. who is still recovering from a surgery on his right arm and John Hopkins does not participate in the race after a crash at the final practice session caused him to injure his left hand and required surgery to be fixed.

All riders take off and do their usual warm-up lap before lining up in their respective grid slots. As the lights go out, Biaggi has a good start and moves into the lead heading into the Coca-Cola Kurve (Turn 1), followed by Ukawa who goes from fifth to second and slots right behind Biaggi. Barros, who initially looked to be bogged down a bit and lost some positions, regained them and goes up into third after a lunge into the first corner. Jacque loses three positions and has to stick with fourth, his teammate Nakano right behind him in fifth. Sixth is Norifumi Abe, who overtook multiple riders from fourteenth on the grid. Rossi meanwhile did not have a good start, losing three places and finding himself stuck down in ninth behind Daijiro Kato at sector one on the opening lap. In the sext few corners, both Ukawa and Barros manage to get by Biaggi - the Japanese for the lead and the Brazilian for second. Biaggi is now coming under attack from Jacque as well. At the Sachsen Kurve (Turn 13), Rossi easily goes up the inside of Kato and takes eighth place, the airhorns blasting as he does so. Carlos Checa is now also right behind Kato, not yet making a move.

On lap two, both Jacque and Nakano have overtaken Biaggi, promoting them to third and fourth position. At the start/finish straight, he loses another position to Abe, who overtakes both McWilliams and Biaggi to move up into fifth spot entering the Coca-Cola Kurve. Biaggi is now sixth and McWilliams seventh. Behind them, Kato makes a late lunge and overtakes Rossi around the outside heading into the Coca-Cola Kurve and entering Turn 2 for eighth. Ukawa and Barros have now opened up a gap to the Gauloises Tech 3 Yamaha duo of Jacque and Nakano in third and fourth. Exiting turn 9, Rossi passes Kato and takes eighth place. Heading into the Sachsen Kurve, Barros tries to dive down Ukawa's inside but isn't quite able to, the airhorns blowing in the background. Further back, Checa also tries to pass Kato on the straight heading up to the corner but isn't able to get past.

Lap three and Barros sets the fastest lap of the race. McWilliams then surprises Biaggi by passing him on the inside heading into the Coca-Cola Kurve for sixth place, Rossi also trying to get by but having to slot behind Biaggi for the time being. At Turns 10 and 11, Barros is now very close to Ukawa but isn't able to make a move at any of the remaining corners or straights. McWilliams is also right behind Abe but is not able to get past at the Queckenberg Kurve (Turn 14).

On lap four, Biaggi blasts past McWilliams on the start/finish straight, the Englishman then retaking the position by outbraking him going into the Coca-Cola Kurve. Turning the bike, he has a slight moment, forcing Biaggi wide and opening the door for Rossi to take seventh as he also tries and succeeds in making a move. At Turn 11 and 12, Barros is once again very close and tries to send it down the inside, not being able to pass and having to settle in second for now. Also at Turn 12, Rossi is right behind McWilliams but isn't able to get by, then both Rossi and Biaggi have a look up on the inside at the Queckenberg Kurve but still aren't able to pass.

Lap five and both Rossi and Biaggi easily pass McWilliams on the start/finish straight, Rossi immediately catching up on Abe in fifth spot. Jacque has by now slowly caught up to the fighting duo of Ukawa and Barros to make it a three-way battle for the lead. Barros then has a look at Ukawa's inside but opts to stay behind for now, getting close once again at Turns 11 and 12 but still not making a move. Rossi then tries to get by Abe at the Sachsen Kurve but fails, having to stay behind the Japanese for now.

On lap six, Jacque goes side by side with Barros and outbrakes him at the Coca-Cola Kurve, taking second position from him. Rossi now sets the fastest lap of the race. Also at the start/finish straight, Rossi overtakes Abe and moves up into fifth spot. By now, Nakano and Rossi have all closed up as well, making the fight for the lead a five-man battle. Barros goes up the inside of Jacque to take second entering Turn 12, with both Rossi and Biaggi making a pass on Nakano and Abe for fourth and sixth place at the Sachsen Kurve.

Lap seven and Biaggi has a look at Nakano's outside, choosing not to pass for now. At Turn 12, Barros throws it up the inside of Ukawa and takes the lead. At the subsequent straight, Barros, Ukawa, Jacque and Rossi go side-by-side but it is Jacque who makes good use of the situation to pass Ukawa and put himself up into second. Ukawa loses two places in just two corners, Rossi having to stay behind for the time being. Behind them, Biaggi also makes a late lunge to pass Nakano and take fifth.

On lap eight, the top six is as follows: Barros, Jacque, Ukawa, Rossi, Biaggi and Nakano. Cardoso has to enter the pits for a jump start, having to serve a stop-and-go penalty. At the straight before the Sachsen Kurve, Barros dangerously swerves from right to left, almost hitting Jacque in the process. Behind them, Rossi passes Repsol Honda teammate Ukawa and moves up into third at the Sachsen Kurve.

Lap nine and Biaggi tries to pass Ukawa as he brakes earlier at the start/finish straight, pushing him wide at the Coca-Cola Kurve. At the Sachsen Kurve, Jacque looks to be making a move but opts to stick behind Barros for the time being. Rossi has now also closed up on the pair in front of him.

On lap ten, Jacque again has a look up the inside of Barros at the start/finish straight but does not make a move for now. Exiting Turn 12, Rossi has to brake a little as the power difference of his four-stroke almost causes him to crash into the back of Jacque's two-stroke, thus not being able to overtake the Frenchman for now.

Lap eleven and Jacque is still all over the back of Barros. Rossi closes up on the Frenchman at the Sachsen Kurve but does not overtake. Checa also briefly has a look at Abe's rear but decides to stay behind for now.

On lap twelve, Checa has a peek up on the inside of Abe, not making the pass for the time being. On the previous lap, three riders have crashed out - Kato, Kagayama and teammate Sete Gibernau. Kato lies injured on the grass, the marshalls and Kagayama helping him out as another one removes his bike from the gravel and yet another one assists Gibernau. The reason for the collision is Gibernau going up the inside of Kato, collecting his rear and bringing down Kagayama alongside him. At the straight before the Sachsen Kurve, Rossi looks to be making a pass on Jacque but stays behind for the time being.

Lap thirteen and Checa now gets past Abe, outbraking him heading into the Coca-Cola Kurve. This promotes him up to sixth. Exiting the Coca-Cola Kurve and heading into Turn 2, Rossi runs wide and Ukawa goes through to third place. At the straight before the Sachsen Kurve, Rossi goes side by side and easily passes Ukawa to regain third. At the Queckenberg Kurve, Biaggi also goes up the inside of the Japanese to snatch fourth away from him.

On lap fourteen, Rossi looks to be making a pass on Jacque at the Sachsen Kurve but once again stays behind for the time being.

Lap fifteen - the halfway point of the race - and Biaggi easily passes Rossi on the start/finish straight for third position, 'The Doctor' waving at him as a signal to get by. At the Sachsen Kurve, Rossi then retakes the lead by diving down his inside and goes back up into third.

On lap sixteen, Rossi opens up a small gap to Biaggi and is now right up the rear of Jacque. At the straight before the Sachsen Kurve, Rossi tries to pass Jacque on the outside but isn't able to get by and has to stay behind in third.

Lap seventeen and Rossi has another peek up Jacque's inside coming up to the Coca-Cola Kurve, but stays behind. At the Sachsen Kurve, Rossi again tries to pass Jacque on the inside but just isn't able to.

On lap eighteen and the positions are still stable. At the straight before the entrance of the Sachsen Kurve, Ukawa tries to pass Biaggi - who has a bad exit - for fourth but fails and stays behind.

Lap nineteen and Rossi finally makes his move on Jacque at the start/finish straight, going up his inside and taking second from him at the Coca-Cola Kurve. At the exit of Turn 12, Rossi then blasts past Barros on the outside, taking over the lead of the race entering the Sachsen Kurve.

On lap twenty, the top six is as follows: Rossi, Barros, Jacque, Biaggi, Ukawa and Checa. At Turns 11 and 12, Barros closes up on Rossi but the Italian manages to ride away on the straight, the difference between the two and four-strokes being very obvious there.

Lap twenty-one and Jacque now overtakes Barros at the start/finish straight for second spot, going up his inside and outbraking him at the Coca-Cola Kurve. Exiting Turn 9, Jacque has a slight moment which unsettles his bike a bit. At Turns 11 and 12, the Frenchman closes up but the power difference of the four-stroke Repsol Honda makes all the difference in the next straight.

On lap twenty-two, Jacque has another moment entering the Coca-Cola Kurve. However, he manages to stay right behind Rossi and harasses him all throughout the lap. At the Sachsen Kurve, Jacque carries more corner speed and manages to exit it better than Rossi but is still not able to go by.

Lap twenty-three Jacque is now all over the rear of Rossi yet loses out on the straights, causing him to stay behind once more.

On lap twenty-four, Jacque tries to take a tighter line at Karthallen (Turn 8) but still isn't able to get past Rossi.

Lap twenty-five and Barros has now come back into the fight, making it a three-way battle for the lead. Just behind him is Biaggi in fourth. At Turn 9, Rossi makes a mistake and goes wide, immediately being overtaken by Jacque and Barros, demoting him to third. Jacque has now retaken the lead of the race. At the Sachsen Kurve, Rossi tries to take second as quick as he can but cannot get past and has to stay behind in third for now.

On lap twenty-six, Biaggi now tries to pass Rossi around the outside of the Coca-Cola Kurve, Rossi forcing him wide and keeping the position. Heading into the Karthallen, Jacque has a moment and that unsettles his bike a bit. Abe in seventh is now also putting pressure on Checa, exiting Turn 9 with a shorter line and trying to go side by side with the Spaniard. The two-strokes of Jacque and Barros are now opening up a gap to third place Rossi on the four-stroke.

Lap twenty-seven and Barros tries to line up a pass at the entrance of the Sachsen Kurve, not being able to and choosing to stay behind for the time being.

On lap twenty-eight, Rossi sets the fastest lap of the race. At the entrance of the Coca-Cola Kurve, Barros makes a dive down Jacque's inside to take over the lead of the race. However, exiting the corner, he loses the front end and collects Jacque as well, the duo sliding into the gravel trap and ending their races effectively. This now gives Rossi the lead of the race and promotes Biaggi and Ukawa into second and third place. Jacque is being carried away by the marshalls, still being able to slowly walk while Barros walks away unhurt on his own.

Lap twenty-nine, the penultimate lap, and Rossi has opened up a slight gap to Biaggi, the Italian being hounded by Ukawa himself. Checa is now fourth, Abe fifth and Nakano sixth.

Rossi crosses the line to start the final lap - lap thirty - and he sets the fastest lap of the race. He has a minor moment exiting Turn 12 as Nakano dives down the inside of Abe at the Sachsen Kurve to take fifth spot. Rossi has no problems, exits the Queckenberg Kurve and does a little wheelie whilst crossing the line to win the race - his eighth win of the season and ninth consecutive podium finish so far. In second place is Biaggi, third is Ukawa and Checa pips a charging Nakano for fourth place. The Japanese rider is fifth and sixth is Abe.

On the parade lap back to parc-fermé, fans have invaded the track. Rossi and others try to dodge them as he raises his arm to celebrate the win.

Ukawa, Biaggi, and Rossi arrived on the podium. Trophies were presented to Ukawa, then Biaggi, and finally Rossi. Rossi raised the trophy while the crowd cheered. The Italian national anthem was played. Following the anthem, the riders were given champagne, which they sprayed at one another and toward the crowd.

Rossi's victory, Biaggi's second place and Ukawa's third place now means Rossi increases his lead at the top of the standings. He has 220 points, followed by Ukawa in a distant second with 124 points and Biaggi in third with 109 points.

== MotoGP classification ==
Pos.	No.	Rider	Team	Manufacturer	Laps	Time/Retired	Grid	Points
1	46	(Italy) Valentino Rossi	Repsol Honda Team	Honda	30	43:32.783	6	25
2	3	(Italy) Max Biaggi	Marlboro Yamaha Team	Yamaha	30	+0.730	3	20
3	11	(Japan) Tohru Ukawa	Repsol Honda Team	Honda	30	+1.100	5	16
4	7	(Spain) Carlos Checa	Marlboro Yamaha Team	Yamaha	30	+2.330	10	13
5	56	(Japan) Shinya Nakano	Gauloises Yamaha Tech 3	Yamaha	30	+2.743	2	11
6	6	(Japan) Norifumi Abe	Antena 3 Yamaha d'Antín	Yamaha	30	+2.780	14	10
7	99	(United Kingdom) Jeremy McWilliams	Proton Team KR	Proton KR	30	+15.438	7	9
8	9	(Japan) Nobuatsu Aoki	Proton Team KR	Proton KR	30	+18.980	13	8
9	8	(Australia) Garry McCoy	Red Bull Yamaha WCM	Yamaha	30	+19.269	8	7
10	66	(Germany) Alex Hofmann	West Honda Pons	Honda	30	+34.533	18	6
11	33	(Japan) Akira Ryō	Team Suzuki	Suzuki	30	+34.592	20	5
12	17	(Netherlands) Jurgen van den Goorbergh	Kanemoto Racing	Honda	30	+45.404	17	4
13	30	(Spain) José Luis Cardoso	Antena 3 Yamaha d'Antín	Yamaha	30	+1:16.460	19	3
Ret (14)	19	(France) Olivier Jacque	Gauloises Yamaha Tech 3	Yamaha	27	Collision	1	
Ret (15)	4	(Brazil) Alex Barros	West Honda Pons	Honda	27	Collision	4	
Ret (16)	55	(France) Régis Laconi	MS Aprilia Racing	Aprilia	25	Accident	15	
Ret (17)	31	(Japan) Tetsuya Harada	Pramac Honda Racing Team	Honda	16	Retirement	16	
Ret (18)	51	(Japan) Yukio Kagayama	Telefónica Movistar Suzuki	Suzuki	10	Accident	11	
Ret (19)	74	(Japan) Daijiro Kato	Fortuna Honda Gresini	Honda	10	Accident	9	
Ret (20)	15	(Spain) Sete Gibernau	Telefónica Movistar Suzuki	Suzuki	10	Accident	12	
DNS	21	(United States) John Hopkins	Red Bull Yamaha WCM	Yamaha		Did not start		

== 250 cc classification ==
Pos.	No.	Rider	Manufacturer	Laps	Time/Retired	Grid	Points
1	3	(Italy) Marco Melandri	Aprilia	22	32:12.725	2	25
2	4	(Italy) Roberto Rolfo	Honda	22	+0.181	4	20
3	9	(Argentina) Sebastián Porto	Yamaha	22	+2.150	6	16
4	10	(Spain) Fonsi Nieto	Aprilia	22	+8.471	1	13
5	15	(Italy) Roberto Locatelli	Aprilia	22	+15.565	3	11
6	24	(Spain) Toni Elías	Aprilia	22	+29.543	9	10
7	8	(Japan) Naoki Matsudo	Yamaha	22	+29.857	10	9
8	21	(Italy) Franco Battaini	Aprilia	22	+29.890	5	8
9	26	(Germany) Ralf Waldmann	Aprilia	22	+38.653	14	7
10	6	(Spain) Alex Debón	Aprilia	22	+40.533	8	6
11	18	(Malaysia) Shahrol Yuzy	Yamaha	22	+42.231	17	5
12	28	(Germany) Dirk Heidolf	Aprilia	22	+59.989	16	4
13	19	(United Kingdom) Leon Haslam	Honda	22	+1:00.304	18	3
14	12	(United Kingdom) Jay Vincent	Honda	22	+1:00.434	19	2
15	42	(Spain) David Checa	Aprilia	22	+1:00.569	20	1
16	76	(Japan) Taro Sekiguchi	Yamaha	22	+1:01.011	25	
17	22	(Spain) Raúl Jara	Aprilia	22	+1:02.851	21	
18	32	(Spain) Héctor Faubel	Aprilia	22	+1:24.583	26	
19	53	(Germany) Max Neukirchner	Honda	21	+1 lap	28	
Ret (20)	25	(France) Vincent Philippe	Aprilia	19	Retirement	15	
Ret (21)	11	(Japan) Haruchika Aoki	Honda	15	Accident	11	
Ret (22)	17	(France) Randy de Puniet	Aprilia	14	Accident	7	
Ret (23)	51	(France) Hugo Marchand	Aprilia	11	Retirement	23	
Ret (24)	77	(France) Thierry vd Bosch	Aprilia	10	Retirement	24	
Ret (25)	54	(Germany) Nico Kehrer	Honda	8	Retirement	29	
Ret (26)	7	(Spain) Emilio Alzamora	Honda	6	Accident	13	
Ret (27)	41	(Netherlands) Jarno Janssen	Honda	4	Accident	22	
Ret (28)	27	(Australia) Casey Stoner	Aprilia	1	Retirement	12	
Ret (29)	52	(Germany) Christian Gemmel	Honda	1	Retirement	27	

== 125 cc classification ==
Pos.	No.	Rider	Manufacturer	Laps	Time/Retired	Grid	Points
1	21	(France) Arnaud Vincent	Aprilia	27	40:40.023	1	25
2	15	(San Marino) Alex de Angelis	Aprilia	27	+0.108	4	20
3	17	(Germany) Steve Jenkner	Aprilia	27	+9.995	7	16
4	1	(San Marino) Manuel Poggiali	Gilera	27	+9.996	2	13
5	22	(Spain) Pablo Nieto	Aprilia	27	+10.160	6	11
6	16	(Italy) Simone Sanna	Aprilia	27	+16.018	3	10
7	26	(Spain) Daniel Pedrosa	Honda	27	+16.826	8	9
8	41	(Japan) Youichi Ui	Derbi	27	+23.921	11	8
9	36	(Finland) Mika Kallio	Honda	27	+24.004	10	7
10	23	(Italy) Gino Borsoi	Aprilia	27	+24.263	12	6
11	25	(Spain) Joan Olivé	Honda	27	+24.807	15	5
12	6	(Italy) Mirko Giansanti	Honda	27	+24.858	16	4
13	34	(Italy) Andrea Dovizioso	Honda	27	+40.540	13	3
14	47	(Spain) Ángel Rodríguez	Aprilia	27	+40.695	9	2
15	5	(Japan) Masao Azuma	Honda	27	+40.943	21	1
16	12	(Germany) Klaus Nöhles	Honda	27	+48.829	22	
17	48	(Spain) Jorge Lorenzo	Derbi	27	+48.856	19	
18	8	(Hungary) Gábor Talmácsi	Honda	27	+49.181	14	
19	19	(Italy) Alex Baldolini	Aprilia	27	+1:01.949	17	
20	57	(United Kingdom) Chaz Davies	Aprilia	27	+1:03.125	23	
21	80	(Spain) Héctor Barberá	Aprilia	27	+1:09.270	29	
22	11	(Italy) Max Sabbatani	Aprilia	27	+1:09.710	18	
23	84	(Italy) Michel Fabrizio	Gilera	27	+1:10.104	25	
24	28	(Italy) Ivan Goi	Aprilia	27	+1:24.892	28	
25	20	(Hungary) Imre Tóth	Honda	27	+1:24.940	26	
26	77	(Switzerland) Thomas Lüthi	Honda	27	+1:28.884	33	
27	31	(Italy) Mattia Angeloni	Gilera	27	+1:31.361	34	
28	72	(Germany) Dario Giuseppetti	Honda	27	+1:31.627	24	
29	73	(Germany) Claudius Klein	Honda	27	+1:32.292	30	
30	92	(Germany) Patrick Unger	Honda	27	+1:32.384	31	
31	74	(Germany) Jascha Büch	Honda	26	+1 lap	35	
32	76	(Czech Republic) Matěj Smrž	Honda	26	+1 lap	37	
33	93	(Germany) Manuel Mickan	Honda	26	+1 lap	32	
Ret (34)	7	(Italy) Stefano Perugini	Italjet	15	Retirement	20	
Ret (35)	50	(Italy) Andrea Ballerini	Honda	14	Retirement	27	
Ret (36)	4	(Italy) Lucio Cecchinello	Aprilia	13	Accident	5	
Ret (37)	42	(Italy) Christian Pistoni	Italjet	7	Retirement	36	

== Championship standings after the race (MotoGP) ==
Below are the standings for the top five riders and constructors after round nine has concluded.

Riders' Championship standings

Pos.	Rider	Points
1	(Italy) Valentino Rossi	220
2	(Japan) Tohru Ukawa	124
3	(Italy) Max Biaggi	109
4	(Brazil) Alex Barros	87
5	(Spain) Carlos Checa	85

Constructors' Championship standings

Pos.	Constructor	Points
1	(Japan) Honda	225
2	(Japan) Yamaha	145
3	(Japan) Suzuki	73
4	(Malaysia) / (United States) Proton KR	48
5	(Italy) Aprilia	28

- Note: Only the top five positions are included for both sets of standings.

Previous race: 2002 British Grand Prix	FIM Grand Prix World Championship; 2002 season	Next race: 2002 Czech Republic Grand Prix
Previous race: 2001 German Grand Prix	German motorcycle Grand Prix	Next race: 2003 German Grand Prix
