= 2002 Dutch TT =

(Netherlands) 2002 Dutch Grand Prix
Race details
- Race 7 of 16 races in the 2002 Grand Prix motorcycle racing season
- Date: 29 June 2002
- Official name: Gauloises Dutch TT
- Location: TT Circuit Assen
- Course: Permanent racing facility; 6.027 km (3.745 mi)

MotoGP
Pole position
Rider	(Italy) Valentino Rossi	Honda
Time	2:01.691	
Fastest lap
Rider	(Italy) Valentino Rossi	Honda
Time	2:00.973 on lap 18	
Podium
First	(Italy) Valentino Rossi	Honda
Second	(Brazil) Alex Barros	Honda
Third	(Spain) Carlos Checa	Yamaha

250cc
Pole position
Rider	(Italy) Marco Melandri	Aprilia
Time	2:04.520	
Fastest lap
Rider	(Italy) Roberto Rolfo	Honda
Time	2:04.824 on lap 12	
Podium
First	(Italy) Marco Melandri	Aprilia
Second	(Spain) Toni Elías	Aprilia
Third	(Italy) Roberto Rolfo	Honda

125cc
Pole position
Rider	(Spain) Daniel Pedrosa	Honda
Time	2:11.882	
Fastest lap
Rider	(Spain) Joan Olivé	Honda
Time	2:11.209 on lap 8	
Podium
First	(Spain) Daniel Pedrosa	Honda
Second	(San Marino) Manuel Poggiali	Gilera
Third	(Spain) Joan Olivé	Honda

The 2002 Dutch TT was the seventh round of the 2002 MotoGP Championship. It took place on the weekend of 27–29 June 2002 at the TT Circuit Assen located in Assen, Netherlands.

== MotoGP classification ==
Pos.	No.	Rider	Team	Manufacturer	Laps	Time/Retired	Grid	Points
1	46	(Italy) Valentino Rossi	Repsol Honda Team	Honda	19	38:49.425	1	25
2	4	(Brazil) Alex Barros	West Honda Pons	Honda	19	+2.233	5	20
3	7	(Spain) Carlos Checa	Marlboro Yamaha Team	Yamaha	19	+9.682	6	16
4	3	(Italy) Max Biaggi	Marlboro Yamaha Team	Yamaha	19	+13.308	2	13
5	11	(Japan) Tohru Ukawa	Repsol Honda Team	Honda	19	+32.386	8	11
6	10	(United States) Kenny Roberts Jr.	Telefónica Movistar Suzuki	Suzuki	19	+33.278	3	10
7	21	(United States) John Hopkins	Red Bull Yamaha WCM	Yamaha	19	+35.463	10	9
8	56	(Japan) Shinya Nakano	Gauloises Yamaha Tech 3	Yamaha	19	+35.619	14	8
9	6	(Japan) Norifumi Abe	Antena 3 Yamaha d'Antín	Yamaha	19	+37.443	19	7
10	17	(Netherlands) Jurgen van den Goorbergh	Kanemoto Racing	Honda	19	+48.100	15	6
11	66	(Germany) Alex Hofmann	Red Bull Yamaha WCM	Yamaha	19	+48.325	12	5
12	74	(Japan) Daijiro Kato	Fortuna Honda Gresini	Honda	19	+49.371	17	4
13	31	(Japan) Tetsuya Harada	Pramac Honda Racing Team	Honda	19	+51.758	7	3
14	19	(France) Olivier Jacque	Gauloises Yamaha Tech 3	Yamaha	19	+1:11.790	20	2
15	33	(Japan) Akira Ryō	Team Suzuki	Suzuki	19	+3:14.399	21	1
Ret (16)	9	(Japan) Nobuatsu Aoki	Proton Team KR	Proton KR	11	Retirement	13	
Ret (17)	99	(United Kingdom) Jeremy McWilliams	Proton Team KR	Proton KR	8	Retirement	9	
Ret (18)	15	(Spain) Sete Gibernau	Telefónica Movistar Suzuki	Suzuki	6	Accident	16	
Ret (19)	55	(France) Régis Laconi	MS Aprilia Racing	Aprilia	6	Retirement	11	
Ret (20)	65	(Italy) Loris Capirossi	West Honda Pons	Honda	4	Accident	4	
Ret (21)	20	(Spain) Pere Riba	Antena 3 Yamaha d'Antín	Yamaha	3	Retirement	18	

== 250 cc classification ==
Pos.	No.	Rider	Manufacturer	Laps	Time/Retired	Grid	Points
1	3	(Italy) Marco Melandri	Aprilia	18	37:48.960	1	25
2	24	(Spain) Toni Elías	Aprilia	18	+4.957	4	20
3	4	(Italy) Roberto Rolfo	Honda	18	+6.672	17	16
4	9	(Argentina) Sebastián Porto	Yamaha	18	+11.273	5	13
5	10	(Spain) Fonsi Nieto	Aprilia	18	+14.165	3	11
6	11	(Japan) Haruchika Aoki	Honda	18	+16.408	15	10
7	15	(Italy) Roberto Locatelli	Aprilia	18	+23.952	9	9
8	27	(Australia) Casey Stoner	Aprilia	18	+26.918	7	8
9	21	(Italy) Franco Battaini	Aprilia	18	+27.455	6	7
10	18	(Malaysia) Shahrol Yuzy	Yamaha	18	+27.478	11	6
11	26	(Germany) Ralf Waldmann	Aprilia	18	+28.272	8	5
12	6	(Spain) Alex Debón	Aprilia	18	+50.764	12	4
13	22	(Spain) Raúl Jara	Aprilia	18	+54.831	19	3
14	8	(Japan) Naoki Matsudo	Yamaha	18	+57.956	13	2
15	25	(France) Vincent Philippe	Aprilia	18	+59.220	10	1
16	42	(Spain) David Checa	Aprilia	18	+59.257	14	
17	76	(Japan) Taro Sekiguchi	Yamaha	18	+1:28.998	26	
18	41	(Netherlands) Jarno Janssen	Honda	18	+1:29.067	16	
19	12	(United Kingdom) Jay Vincent	Honda	18	+1:29.259	24	
20	28	(Germany) Dirk Heidolf	Aprilia	18	+1:40.747	20	
21	59	(Netherlands) Peter Politiek	Honda	17	+1 lap	28	
22	61	(Netherlands) Jarno Boesveld	Aprilia	17	+1 lap	27	
23	60	(Netherlands) Gert Pieper	Aprilia	17	+1 lap	25	
Ret (24)	17	(France) Randy de Puniet	Aprilia	7	Accident	2	
Ret (25)	19	(United Kingdom) Leon Haslam	Honda	7	Retirement	22	
Ret (26)	32	(Spain) Héctor Faubel	Aprilia	4	Accident	23	
Ret (27)	51	(France) Hugo Marchand	Aprilia	2	Accident	21	
Ret (28)	7	(Spain) Emilio Alzamora	Honda	2	Retirement	18	
DNQ	77	(France) Thierry Van Den Bosch	Aprilia		Did not qualify		
DNQ	58	(Netherlands) Jan Blok	Honda		Did not qualify		

== 125 cc classification ==
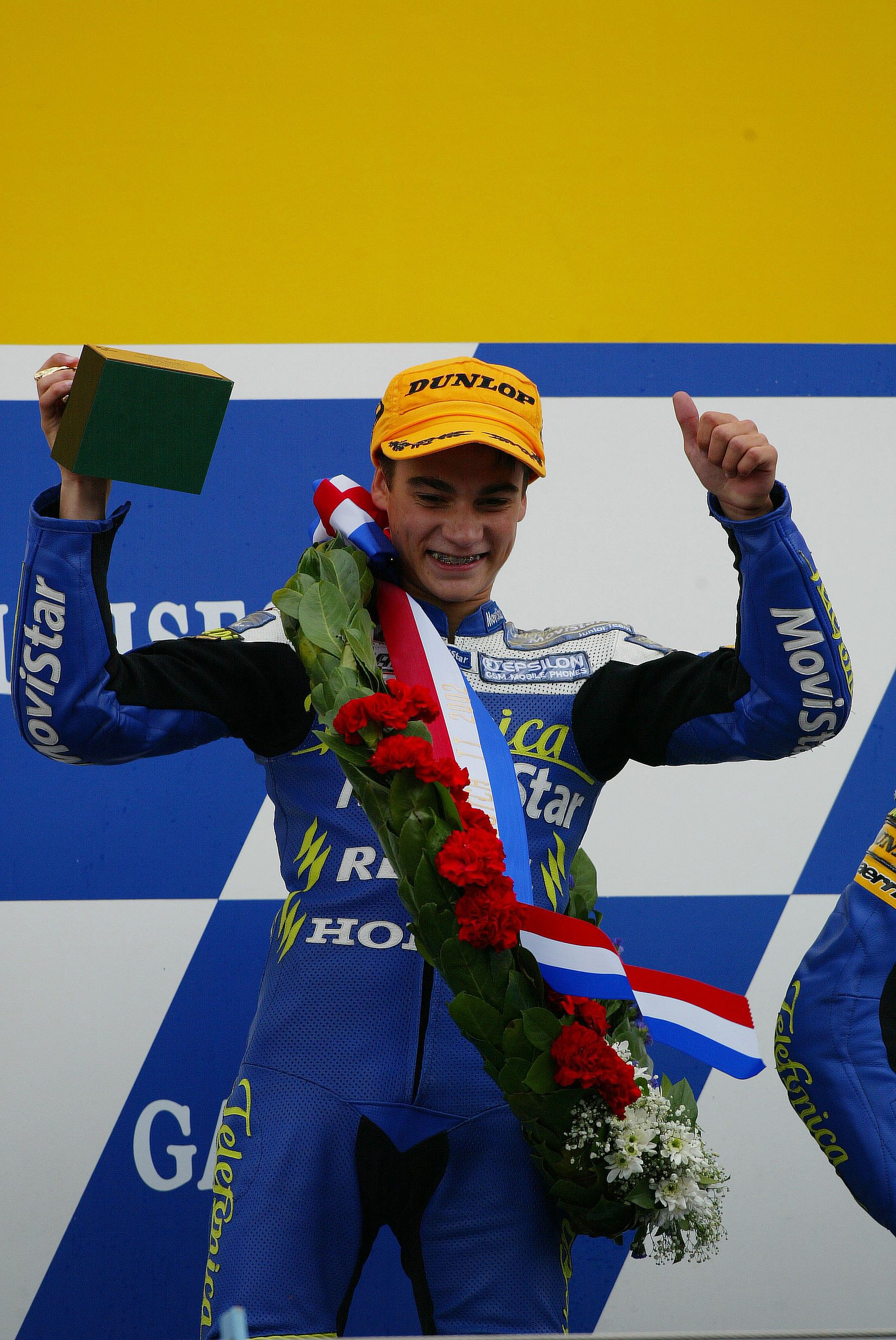
Daniel Pedrosa, celebrating on the podium after winning the 125cc race.

Pos.	No.	Rider	Manufacturer	Laps	Time/Retired	Grid	Points
1	26	(Spain) Daniel Pedrosa	Honda	17	37:31.974	1	25
2	1	(San Marino) Manuel Poggiali	Gilera	17	+2.523	6	20
3	25	(Spain) Joan Olivé	Honda	17	+2.716	12	16
4	21	(France) Arnaud Vincent	Aprilia	17	+2.813	5	13
5	4	(Italy) Lucio Cecchinello	Aprilia	17	+2.964	2	11
6	17	(Germany) Steve Jenkner	Aprilia	17	+3.031	8	10
7	22	(Spain) Pablo Nieto	Aprilia	17	+15.184	11	9
8	41	(Japan) Youichi Ui	Derbi	17	+15.358	15	8
9	15	(San Marino) Alex de Angelis	Aprilia	17	+15.812	3	7
10	47	(Spain) Ángel Rodríguez	Aprilia	17	+16.130	7	6
11	34	(Italy) Andrea Dovizioso	Honda	17	+17.128	19	5
12	16	(Italy) Simone Sanna	Aprilia	17	+17.223	18	4
13	23	(Italy) Gino Borsoi	Aprilia	17	+17.489	14	3
14	5	(Japan) Masao Azuma	Honda	17	+19.072	13	2
15	8	(Hungary) Gábor Talmácsi	Honda	17	+28.597	20	1
16	48	(Spain) Jorge Lorenzo	Derbi	17	+35.145	16	
17	39	(Czech Republic) Jaroslav Huleš	Aprilia	17	+39.266	23	
18	50	(Italy) Andrea Ballerini	Honda	17	+39.533	17	
19	6	(Italy) Mirko Giansanti	Honda	17	+39.772	29	
20	80	(Spain) Héctor Barberá	Aprilia	17	+40.010	24	
21	19	(Italy) Alex Baldolini	Aprilia	17	+42.778	22	
22	18	(Czech Republic) Jakub Smrž	Honda	17	+43.061	21	
23	75	(Italy) Fabrizio Lai	Honda	17	+51.811	26	
24	57	(United Kingdom) Chaz Davies	Aprilia	17	+59.504	27	
25	66	(Japan) Shuhei Aoyama	Honda	17	+1:06.857	31	
26	31	(Italy) Mattia Angeloni	Gilera	17	+1:14.521	30	
27	20	(Hungary) Imre Tóth	Honda	17	+1:20.557	28	
28	24	(United Kingdom) Leon Camier	Italjet	17	+1:46.306	32	
29	33	(Italy) Stefano Bianco	Aprilia	17	+1:46.648	10	
30	89	(Netherlands) Adri den Bekker	Honda	17	+1:46.679	35	
31	60	(Netherlands) Randy Gevers	Honda	17	+2:01.813	34	
32	62	(Netherlands) Gerald Perdon	Honda	16	+1 lap	36	
Ret (33)	36	(Finland) Mika Kallio	Honda	16	Accident	4	
Ret (34)	84	(Italy) Michel Fabrizio	Gilera	16	Accident	25	
Ret (35)	32	(Italy) Gianluigi Scalvini	Aprilia	15	Retirement	9	
Ret (36)	61	(Netherlands) Raymond Schouten	Honda	11	Retirement	33	
Ret (37)	7	(Italy) Stefano Perugini	Italjet	2	Retirement	37	

== Championship standings after the race (MotoGP) ==
Below are the standings for the top five riders and constructors after round seven has concluded.

Riders' Championship standings

Pos.	Rider	Points
1	(Italy) Valentino Rossi	170
2	(Japan) Tohru Ukawa	108
3	(Spain) Carlos Checa	72
4	(Brazil) Alex Barros	71
5	(Italy) Max Biaggi	69

Constructors' Championship standings

Pos.	Constructor	Points
1	(Japan) Honda	175
2	(Japan) Yamaha	105
3	(Japan) Suzuki	58
4	(Malaysia) / (United States) Proton KR	32
5	(Italy) Aprilia	28

- Note: Only the top five positions are included for both sets of standings.

Previous race: 2002 Catalan Grand Prix	FIM Grand Prix World Championship; 2002 season	Next race: 2002 British Grand Prix
Previous race: 2001 Dutch TT	Dutch TT	Next race: 2003 Dutch TT
