= 2002 British motorcycle Grand Prix =

(United Kingdom) 2002 British Grand Prix
Race details
- Race 8 of 16 races in the 2002 Grand Prix motorcycle racing season
- Date: 14 July 2002
- Official name: Cinzano British Grand Prix
- Location: Donington Park
- Course: Permanent racing facility; 4.023 km (2.500 mi)

MotoGP
Pole position
Rider	(Italy) Valentino Rossi	Honda
Time	1:31.563	
Fastest lap
Rider	(Italy) Valentino Rossi	Honda
Time	1:32.247 on lap 4	
Podium
First	(Italy) Valentino Rossi	Honda
Second	(Italy) Max Biaggi	Yamaha
Third	(Brazil) Alex Barros	Honda

250cc
Pole position
Rider	(Spain) Fonsi Nieto	Aprilia
Time	1:33.558	
Fastest lap
Rider	(Spain) Fonsi Nieto	Aprilia
Time	1:34.411 on lap 26	
Podium
First	(Italy) Marco Melandri	Aprilia
Second	(Spain) Fonsi Nieto	Aprilia
Third	(Spain) Toni Elías	Aprilia

125cc
Pole position
Rider	(San Marino) Manuel Poggiali	Gilera
Time	1:38.078	
Fastest lap
Rider	(Italy) Lucio Cecchinello	Aprilia
Time	1:38.312 on lap 6	
Podium
First	(France) Arnaud Vincent	Aprilia
Second	(Spain) Daniel Pedrosa	Honda
Third	(San Marino) Manuel Poggiali	Gilera

The 2002 British motorcycle Grand Prix was the eighth round of the 2002 MotoGP Championship. It took place on the weekend of 12–14 July 2002 at the Donington Park circuit.

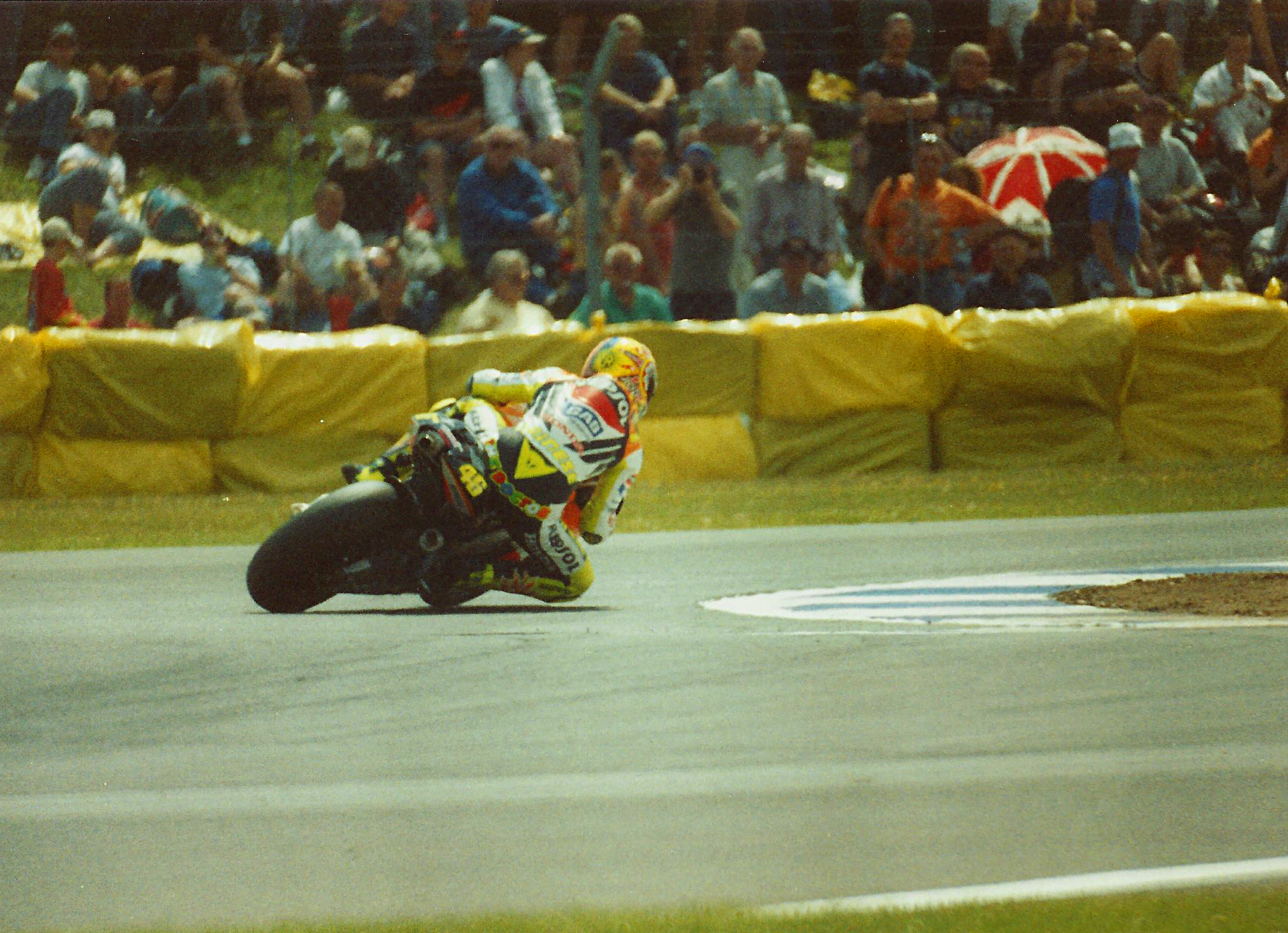
Valentino Rossi, riding his Honda. Eventually he went on to win the MotoGP race.

== MotoGP classification ==
Pos.	No.	Rider	Team	Manufacturer	Laps	Time/Retired	Grid	Points
1	46	(Italy) Valentino Rossi	Repsol Honda Team	Honda	30	46:32.888	1	25
2	3	(Italy) Max Biaggi	Marlboro Yamaha Team	Yamaha	30	+2.371	5	20
3	4	(Brazil) Alex Barros	West Honda Pons	Honda	30	+5.533	4	16
4	6	(Japan) Norifumi Abe	Antena 3 Yamaha d'Antín	Yamaha	30	+22.036	13	13
5	19	(France) Olivier Jacque	Gauloises Yamaha Tech 3	Yamaha	30	+28.087	12	11
6	15	(Spain) Sete Gibernau	Telefónica Movistar Suzuki	Suzuki	30	+28.400	17	10
7	74	(Japan) Daijiro Kato	Fortuna Honda Gresini	Honda	30	+28.947	11	9
8	21	(United States) John Hopkins	Red Bull Yamaha WCM	Yamaha	30	+31.497	6	8
9	9	(Japan) Nobuatsu Aoki	Proton Team KR	Proton KR	30	+31.947	10	7
10	56	(Japan) Shinya Nakano	Gauloises Yamaha Tech 3	Yamaha	30	+41.454	15	6
11	31	(Japan) Tetsuya Harada	Pramac Honda Racing Team	Honda	30	+49.458	3	5
12	8	(Australia) Garry McCoy	Red Bull Yamaha WCM	Yamaha	30	+53.709	18	4
13	33	(Japan) Akira Ryō	Team Suzuki	Suzuki	30	+54.480	14	3
14	10	(United States) Kenny Roberts Jr.	Telefónica Movistar Suzuki	Suzuki	30	+54.594	8	2
15	17	(Netherlands) Jurgen van den Goorbergh	Kanemoto Racing	Honda	30	+54.866	9	1
16	55	(France) Régis Laconi	MS Aprilia Racing	Aprilia	30	+55.525	16	
17	66	(Germany) Alex Hofmann	West Honda Pons	Honda	30	+1:05.901	19	
Ret (18)	7	(Spain) Carlos Checa	Marlboro Yamaha Team	Yamaha	19	Retirement	2	
Ret (19)	99	(United Kingdom) Jeremy McWilliams	Proton Team KR	Proton KR	6	Retirement	7	
DNS	20	(Spain) Pere Riba	Antena 3 Yamaha d'Antín	Yamaha		Did not start		
WD	11	(Japan) Tohru Ukawa	Repsol Honda Team	Honda		Withdrew		

== 250 cc classification ==
Pos.	No.	Rider	Manufacturer	Laps	Time/Retired	Grid	Points
1	3	(Italy) Marco Melandri	Aprilia	27	42:55.728	2	25
2	10	(Spain) Fonsi Nieto	Aprilia	27	+0.717	1	20
3	24	(Spain) Toni Elías	Aprilia	27	+3.493	5	16
4	21	(Italy) Franco Battaini	Aprilia	27	+3.934	8	13
5	4	(Italy) Roberto Rolfo	Honda	27	+4.407	7	11
6	17	(France) Randy de Puniet	Aprilia	27	+19.852	12	10
7	11	(Japan) Haruchika Aoki	Honda	27	+21.770	10	9
8	8	(Japan) Naoki Matsudo	Yamaha	27	+24.580	6	8
9	6	(Spain) Alex Debón	Aprilia	27	+25.987	11	7
10	18	(Malaysia) Shahrol Yuzy	Yamaha	27	+26.202	15	6
11	27	(Australia) Casey Stoner	Aprilia	27	+31.621	13	5
12	7	(Spain) Emilio Alzamora	Honda	27	+36.116	4	4
13	15	(Italy) Roberto Locatelli	Aprilia	27	+45.339	14	3
14	76	(Japan) Taro Sekiguchi	Yamaha	27	+45.538	9	2
15	42	(Spain) David Checa	Aprilia	27	+57.476	16	1
16	12	(United Kingdom) Jay Vincent	Honda	27	+1:00.795	21	
17	19	(United Kingdom) Leon Haslam	Honda	27	+1:03.974	20	
18	28	(Germany) Dirk Heidolf	Aprilia	27	+1:05.156	18	
19	41	(Netherlands) Jarno Janssen	Honda	27	+1:19.402	17	
20	32	(Spain) Héctor Faubel	Aprilia	27	+1:22.218	19	
21	44	(United Kingdom) Andrew Whittley	Aprilia	26	+1 lap	25	
Ret (22)	25	(France) Vincent Philippe	Aprilia	26	Accident	22	
Ret (23)	22	(Spain) Raúl Jara	Aprilia	17	Retirement	23	
Ret (24)	9	(Argentina) Sebastián Porto	Yamaha	12	Retirement	3	
Ret (25)	51	(France) Hugo Marchand	Aprilia	4	Accident	24	
DNQ	43	(United Kingdom) Christopher Sansome	Honda		Did not qualify		
WD	47	(United Kingdom) Jason Boyce	Honda		Withdrew		

== 125 cc classification ==
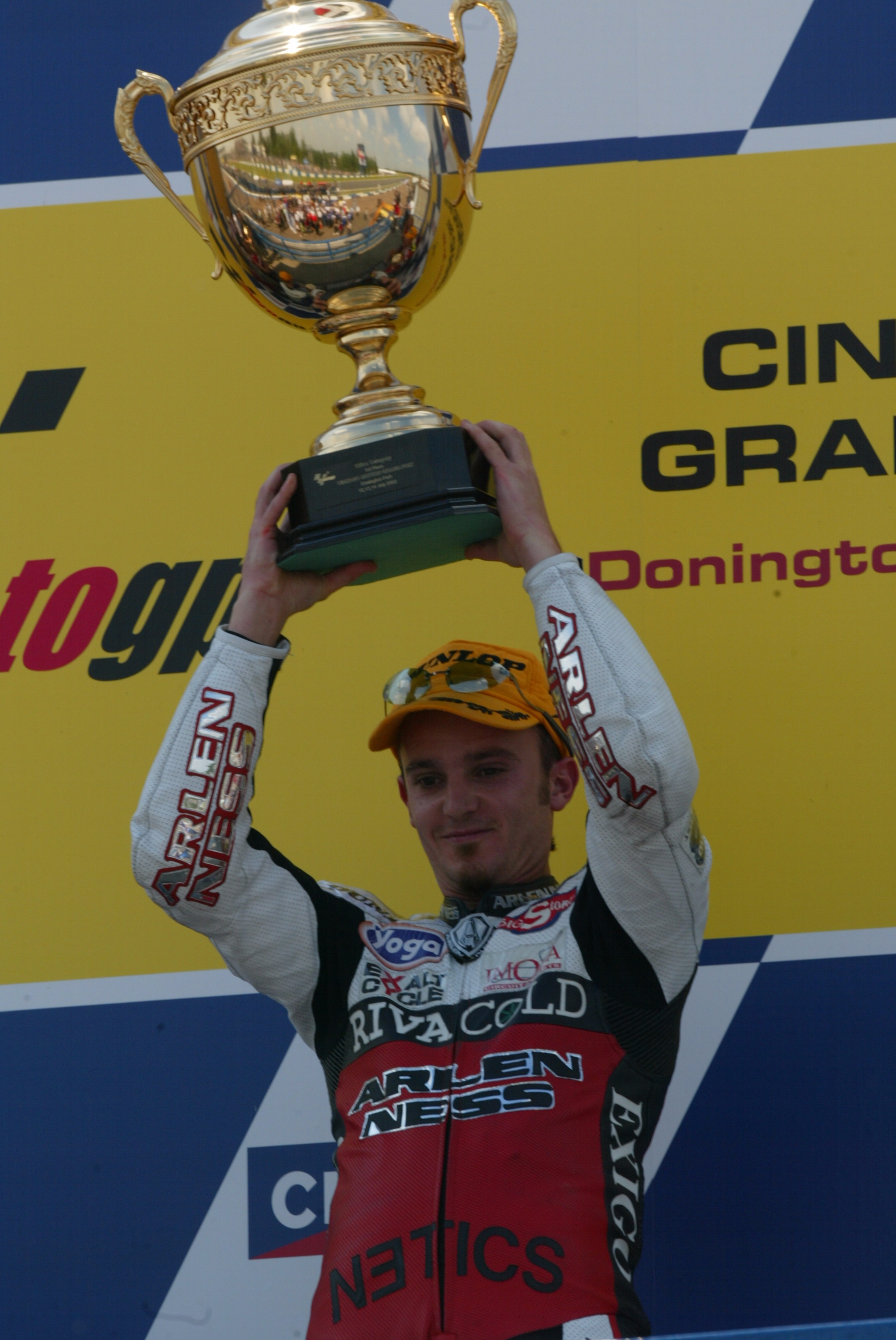
Arnaud Vincent, celebrating on the podium after winning the 125cc race.

Pos.	No.	Rider	Manufacturer	Laps	Time/Retired	Grid	Points
1	21	(France) Arnaud Vincent	Aprilia	26	42:57.387	16	25
2	26	(Spain) Daniel Pedrosa	Honda	26	+0.193	3	20
3	1	(San Marino) Manuel Poggiali	Gilera	26	+0.699	1	16
4	5	(Japan) Masao Azuma	Honda	26	+13.482	10	13
5	17	(Germany) Steve Jenkner	Aprilia	26	+13.643	14	11
6	25	(Spain) Joan Olivé	Honda	26	+14.073	6	10
7	15	(San Marino) Alex de Angelis	Aprilia	26	+15.650	7	9
8	41	(Japan) Youichi Ui	Derbi	26	+18.608	4	8
9	34	(Italy) Andrea Dovizioso	Honda	26	+20.761	13	7
10	66	(Japan) Shuhei Aoyama	Honda	26	+21.553	20	6
11	7	(Italy) Stefano Perugini	Italjet	26	+41.238	18	5
12	50	(Italy) Andrea Ballerini	Honda	26	+41.942	8	4
13	48	(Spain) Jorge Lorenzo	Derbi	26	+46.464	21	3
14	75	(Italy) Fabrizio Lai	Honda	26	+46.699	12	2
15	6	(Italy) Mirko Giansanti	Honda	26	+52.816	22	1
16	57	(United Kingdom) Chaz Davies	Aprilia	26	+56.261	24	
17	16	(Italy) Simone Sanna	Aprilia	26	+1:03.435	11	
18	19	(Italy) Alex Baldolini	Aprilia	26	+1:10.892	29	
19	28	(Italy) Ivan Goi	Aprilia	26	+1:17.003	33	
20	20	(Hungary) Imre Tóth	Honda	26	+1:32.295	28	
21	69	(United Kingdom) Christian Elkin	Honda	25	+1 lap	32	
22	70	(United Kingdom) Christopher Martin	Honda	25	+1 lap	34	
23	31	(Italy) Mattia Angeloni	Gilera	25	+1 lap	30	
24	24	(United Kingdom) Leon Camier	Italjet	25	+1 lap	31	
Ret (25)	4	(Italy) Lucio Cecchinello	Aprilia	23	Accident	2	
Ret (26)	36	(Finland) Mika Kallio	Honda	18	Retirement	9	
Ret (27)	33	(Italy) Stefano Bianco	Aprilia	16	Retirement	25	
Ret (28)	90	(United Kingdom) Guy Farbrother	Honda	15	Accident	35	
Ret (29)	23	(Italy) Gino Borsoi	Aprilia	7	Accident	5	
Ret (30)	80	(Spain) Héctor Barberá	Aprilia	3	Accident	26	
Ret (31)	8	(Hungary) Gábor Talmácsi	Honda	3	Accident	19	
Ret (32)	47	(Spain) Ángel Rodríguez	Aprilia	3	Accident	17	
Ret (33)	84	(Italy) Michel Fabrizio	Gilera	2	Accident	23	
Ret (34)	11	(Italy) Max Sabbatani	Aprilia	0	Accident	27	
Ret (35)	22	(Spain) Pablo Nieto	Aprilia	0	Accident	15	
Ret (36)	91	(United Kingdom) Midge Smart	Honda	0	Accident	36	

== Championship standings after the race (MotoGP) ==
Below are the standings for the top five riders and constructors after round eight has concluded.

Riders' Championship standings

Pos.	Rider	Points
1	(Italy) Valentino Rossi	195
2	(Japan) Tohru Ukawa	108
3	(Italy) Max Biaggi	89
4	(Brazil) Alex Barros	87
5	(Spain) Carlos Checa	72

Constructors' Championship standings

Pos.	Constructor	Points
1	(Japan) Honda	200
2	(Japan) Yamaha	125
3	(Japan) Suzuki	68
4	(Malaysia) / (United States) Proton KR	39
5	(Italy) Aprilia	28

- Note: Only the top five positions are included for both sets of standings.

Previous race: 2002 Dutch TT	FIM Grand Prix World Championship; 2002 season	Next race: 2002 German Grand Prix
Previous race: 2001 British Grand Prix	British motorcycle Grand Prix	Next race: 2003 British Grand Prix
