= 2001 Portuguese motorcycle Grand Prix =

(Portugal) 2001 Portuguese Grand Prix
Race details
- Race 11 of 16 races in the 2001 Grand Prix motorcycle racing season
- Date: 9 September 2001
- Official name: Grande Premio Marlboro de Portugal
- Location: Autódromo do Estoril
- Course: Permanent racing facility; 4.182 km (2.599 mi)

500cc
Pole position
- Rider: (Italy) Max Biaggi
- Time: 1:40.076
Fastest lap
- Rider: (Italy) Loris Capirossi
- Time: 1:40.683 on lap 4
Podium
- First: (Italy) Valentino Rossi
- Second: (Italy) Loris Capirossi
- Third: (Australia) Garry McCoy

250cc
Pole position
- Rider: (Japan) Tetsuya Harada
- Time: 1:41.993
Fastest lap
- Rider: (Japan) Daijiro Kato
- Time: 1:42.285 on lap 17
Podium
- First: (Japan) Daijiro Kato
- Second: (Italy) Marco Melandri
- Third: (Japan) Tetsuya Harada

125cc
Pole position
- Rider: (San Marino) Manuel Poggiali
- Time: 1:45.923
Fastest lap
- Rider: (Japan) Youichi Ui
- Time: 1:46.329 on lap 19
Podium
- First: (San Marino) Manuel Poggiali
- Second: (Japan) Youichi Ui
- Third: (Spain) Toni Elías

The 2001 Portuguese motorcycle Grand Prix was the eleventh round of the 2001 Grand Prix motorcycle racing season. It took place on the weekend of 7–9 September 2001 at the Autódromo do Estoril.

== 500 cc classification ==
Pos.	No.	Rider	Team	Manufacturer	Laps	Time/Retired	Grid	Points
1	46	(Italy) Valentino Rossi	Nastro Azzurro Honda	Honda	28	47:25.357	3	25
2	65	(Italy) Loris Capirossi	West Honda Pons	Honda	28	+1.756	2	20
3	5	(Australia) Garry McCoy	Red Bull Yamaha WCM	Yamaha	28	+14.030	9	16
4	7	(Spain) Carlos Checa	Marlboro Yamaha Team	Yamaha	28	+24.337	8	13
5	3	(Italy) Max Biaggi	Marlboro Yamaha Team	Yamaha	28	+31.348	1	11
6	1	(United States) Kenny Roberts Jr.	Telefónica Movistar Suzuki	Suzuki	28	+31.925	11	10
7	17	(Netherlands) Jurgen van den Goorbergh	Proton Team KR	Proton KR	28	+37.140	5	9
8	19	(France) Olivier Jacque	Gauloises Yamaha Tech 3	Yamaha	28	+41.043	15	8
9	56	(Japan) Shinya Nakano	Gauloises Yamaha Tech 3	Yamaha	28	+50.273	14	7
10	10	(Spain) José Luis Cardoso	Antena 3 Yamaha d'Antin	Yamaha	28	+58.227	16	6
11	12	(Japan) Haruchika Aoki	Arie Molenaar Racing	Honda	28	+1:27.139	17	5
12	14	(Australia) Anthony West	Dee Cee Jeans Racing Team	Honda	28	+1:27.459	18	4
13	16	(Sweden) Johan Stigefelt	Sabre Sport	Sabre V4	27	+1 lap	20	3
14	18	(Australia) Brendan Clarke	Shell Advance Honda	Honda	27	+1 lap	22	2
15	21	(Netherlands) Barry Veneman	Dee Cee Jeans Racing Team	Honda	27	+1 lap	21	1
Ret	41	(Japan) Noriyuki Haga	Red Bull Yamaha WCM	Yamaha	25	Accident	13	
Ret	9	(United Kingdom) Leon Haslam	Shell Advance Honda	Honda	18	Accident	19	
Ret	28	(Spain) Àlex Crivillé	Repsol YPF Honda Team	Honda	12	Retirement	12	
Ret	15	(Spain) Sete Gibernau	Telefónica Movistar Suzuki	Suzuki	2	Retirement	7	
Ret	11	(Japan) Tohru Ukawa	Repsol YPF Honda Team	Honda	0	Accident	4	
Ret	4	(Brazil) Alex Barros	West Honda Pons	Honda	0	Accident	6	
Ret	6	(Japan) Norifumi Abe	Antena 3 Yamaha d'Antin	Yamaha	0	Accident	10	

== 250 cc classification ==
Pos.	No.	Rider	Manufacturer	Laps	Time/Retired	Grid	Points
1	74	(Japan) Daijiro Kato	Honda	26	44:38.464	2	25
2	5	(Italy) Marco Melandri	Aprilia	26	+16.993	5	20
3	31	(Japan) Tetsuya Harada	Aprilia	26	+27.360	1	16
4	44	(Italy) Roberto Rolfo	Aprilia	26	+34.207	11	13
5	99	(United Kingdom) Jeremy McWilliams	Aprilia	26	+36.916	3	11
6	8	(Japan) Naoki Matsudo	Yamaha	26	+37.101	7	10
7	10	(Spain) Fonsi Nieto	Aprilia	26	+44.441	4	9
8	42	(Spain) David Checa	Honda	26	+45.404	8	8
9	21	(Italy) Franco Battaini	Aprilia	26	+49.202	17	7
10	18	(Malaysia) Shahrol Yuzy	Yamaha	26	+51.072	19	6
11	12	(Germany) Klaus Nöhles	Aprilia	26	+55.776	18	5
12	6	(Spain) Alex Debón	Aprilia	26	+59.663	10	4
13	22	(Spain) José David de Gea	Yamaha	26	+1:19.420	16	3
14	24	(United Kingdom) Jason Vincent	Yamaha	26	+1:19.835	25	2
15	20	(Spain) Jerónimo Vidal	Aprilia	26	+1:20.435	22	1
16	16	(Spain) David Tomás	Honda	26	+1:20.795	23	
17	81	(France) Randy de Puniet	Aprilia	26	+1:23.776	12	
18	37	(Italy) Luca Boscoscuro	Aprilia	26	+1:27.354	24	
19	36	(Spain) Luis Costa	Yamaha	25	+1 lap	27	
20	14	(Germany) Katja Poensgen	Honda	25	+1 lap	29	
21	71	(Spain) Javier Díaz	Honda	25	+1 lap	31	
22	72	(Spain) Michael García	Aprilia	25	+1 lap	32	
Ret	23	(Brazil) César Barros	Yamaha	20	Retirement	30	
Ret	66	(Germany) Alex Hofmann	Aprilia	12	Accident	15	
Ret	46	(Japan) Taro Sekiguchi	Yamaha	12	Accident	14	
Ret	11	(Italy) Riccardo Chiarello	Aprilia	10	Retirement	26	
Ret	57	(Italy) Lorenzo Lanzi	Aprilia	9	Accident	13	
Ret	7	(Spain) Emilio Alzamora	Honda	5	Accident	6	
Ret	15	(Italy) Roberto Locatelli	Aprilia	4	Retirement	9	
Ret	9	(Argentina) Sebastián Porto	Yamaha	4	Retirement	21	
Ret	50	(France) Sylvain Guintoli	Aprilia	2	Accident	20	
DNS	45	(United Kingdom) Stuart Edwards	Yamaha	0	Did not start	28	
DNQ	41	(Spain) Dámaso Nácher	Honda		Did not qualify		
DNQ	70	(Portugal) José Estrela	Honda		Did not qualify		

== 125 cc classification ==
Pos.	No.	Rider	Manufacturer	Laps	Time/Retired	Grid	Points
1	54	(San Marino) Manuel Poggiali	Gilera	24	42:55.454	1	25
2	41	(Japan) Youichi Ui	Derbi	24	+0.011	2	20
3	24	(Spain) Toni Elías	Honda	24	+8.306	5	16
4	16	(Italy) Simone Sanna	Aprilia	24	+8.473	3	13
5	26	(Spain) Daniel Pedrosa	Honda	24	+26.230	8	11
6	18	(Czech Republic) Jakub Smrž	Honda	24	+30.439	7	10
7	39	(Czech Republic) Jaroslav Huleš	Honda	24	+30.513	10	9
8	6	(Italy) Mirko Giansanti	Honda	24	+31.500	17	8
9	11	(Italy) Max Sabbatani	Aprilia	24	+33.982	11	7
10	21	(France) Arnaud Vincent	Honda	24	+35.553	14	6
11	19	(Italy) Alessandro Brannetti	Aprilia	24	+36.820	18	5
12	28	(Hungary) Gábor Talmácsi	Honda	24	+37.344	16	4
13	20	(Italy) Gaspare Caffiero	Aprilia	24	+50.138	15	3
14	12	(Spain) Raúl Jara	Aprilia	24	+57.302	26	2
15	23	(Italy) Gino Borsoi	Aprilia	24	+57.409	22	1
16	9	(Italy) Lucio Cecchinello	Aprilia	24	+1:10.035	4	
17	77	(Spain) Adrián Araujo	Honda	24	+1:12.889	29	
18	8	(Italy) Gianluigi Scalvini	Italjet	24	+1:24.889	27	
19	30	(Germany) Jascha Büch	Honda	24	+1:40.128	30	
20	86	(Portugal) José Leite	Honda	23	+1 lap	32	
Ret	90	(Spain) José Luis Nión	Honda	17	Retirement	31	
Ret	29	(Spain) Ángel Nieto Jr.	Honda	12	Retirement	25	
Ret	7	(Italy) Stefano Perugini	Italjet	12	Retirement	21	
Ret	27	(Italy) Marco Petrini	Honda	11	Retirement	28	
Ret	22	(Spain) Pablo Nieto	Derbi	9	Retirement	20	
Ret	5	(Japan) Noboru Ueda	TSR-Honda	8	Accident	23	
Ret	17	(Germany) Steve Jenkner	Aprilia	5	Retirement	12	
Ret	31	(Spain) Ángel Rodríguez	Aprilia	5	Retirement	6	
Ret	4	(Japan) Masao Azuma	Honda	4	Retirement	24	
Ret	15	(San Marino) Alex de Angelis	Honda	2	Accident	9	
Ret	25	(Spain) Joan Olivé	Honda	1	Accident	13	
DNS	34	(Andorra) Eric Bataille	Honda	0	Did not start	19	
DNQ	88	(Portugal) João Pinto	Honda		Did not qualify		
DNQ	89	(Portugal) Ricardo Tomé	Aprilia		Did not qualify		
DNQ	87	(Portugal) José Monteiro	Honda		Did not qualify		

== Championship standings after the race (500cc) ==
Below are the standings for the top five riders and constructors after round eleven has concluded.

Riders' Championship standings

Pos.	Rider	Points
1	(Italy) Valentino Rossi	220
2	(Italy) Max Biaggi	177
3	(Italy) Loris Capirossi	147
4	(Brazil) Alex Barros	107
5	(Japan) Shinya Nakano	107

Constructors' Championship standings

Pos.	Constructor	Points
1	(Japan) Honda	247
2	(Japan) Yamaha	213
3	(Japan) Suzuki	101
4	(Malaysia) Proton KR	52
5	(United Kingdom) Sabre V4	4

- Note: Only the top five positions are included for both sets of standings.

Previous race: 2001 Czech Republic Grand Prix	FIM Grand Prix World Championship; 2001 season	Next race: 2001 Valencian Grand Prix
Previous race: 2000 Portuguese Grand Prix	Portuguese Grand Prix	Next race: 2002 Portuguese Grand Prix
