= 2001 Valencian Community motorcycle Grand Prix =

2001 Valencian Community Grand Prix
Race details
- Race 12 of 16 races in the 2001 Grand Prix motorcycle racing season
- Date: 23 September 2001
- Official name: Gran Premio Marlboro de la Comunitat Valenciana
- Location: Circuit de Valencia
- Course: Permanent racing facility; 4.005 km (2.489 mi)

500cc
Pole position
- Rider: (Italy) Max Biaggi
- Time: 1:34.496
Fastest lap
- Rider: (Spain) Sete Gibernau
- Time: 1:36.792 on lap 30
Podium
- First: (Spain) Sete Gibernau
- Second: (Brazil) Alex Barros
- Third: (United States) Kenny Roberts Jr.

250cc
Pole position
- Rider: (Spain) Fonsi Nieto
- Time: 1:36.379
Fastest lap
- Rider: (Japan) Daijiro Kato
- Time: 1:36.701 on lap 16
Podium
- First: (Japan) Daijiro Kato
- Second: (Japan) Tetsuya Harada
- Third: (Spain) Fonsi Nieto

125cc
Pole position
- Rider: (Spain) Toni Elías
- Time: 1:40.481
Fastest lap
- Rider: (Italy) Gino Borsoi
- Time: 1:41.464 on lap 7
Podium
- First: (San Marino) Manuel Poggiali
- Second: (Spain) Toni Elías
- Third: (Spain) Daniel Pedrosa

The 2001 Valencian Community motorcycle Grand Prix was the twelfth round of the 2001 Grand Prix motorcycle racing season. It took place on the weekend of 21–23 September 2001 at the Circuit de Valencia. Ten days after the September 11 attacks on New York and Washington D.C., Grand Prix Motorcycle Racing's governing body, the Fédération Internationale de Motocyclisme (FIM) announced that the Valencian Community Motorcycle Grand Prix would go ahead as scheduled. Additionally, the Royal Automobile Club of Spain urged fans and spectators to behave "in keeping with the gravity of the situation and in collective participation in the pain of American citizens".

== 500 cc classification ==
Pos.	No.	Rider	Team	Manufacturer	Laps	Time/Retired	Grid	Points
1	15	(Spain) Sete Gibernau	Telefónica Movistar Suzuki	Suzuki	30	54:39.391	12	25
2	4	(Brazil) Alex Barros	West Honda Pons	Honda	30	+0.293	11	20
3	1	(United States) Kenny Roberts Jr.	Telefónica Movistar Suzuki	Suzuki	30	+1.241	7	16
4	7	(Spain) Carlos Checa	Marlboro Yamaha Team	Yamaha	30	+7.052	8	13
5	19	(France) Olivier Jacque	Gauloises Yamaha Tech 3	Yamaha	30	+29.809	14	11
6	11	(Japan) Tohru Ukawa	Repsol YPF Honda Team	Honda	30	+29.863	10	10
7	56	(Japan) Shinya Nakano	Gauloises Yamaha Tech 3	Yamaha	30	+31.093	3	9
8	6	(Japan) Norifumi Abe	Antena 3 Yamaha d'Antin	Yamaha	30	+31.609	13	8
9	17	(Netherlands) Jurgen van den Goorbergh	Proton Team KR	Proton KR	30	+32.783	9	7
10	3	(Italy) Max Biaggi	Marlboro Yamaha Team	Yamaha	30	+37.774	1	6
11	46	(Italy) Valentino Rossi	Nastro Azzurro Honda	Honda	30	+40.512	2	5
12	5	(Australia) Garry McCoy	Red Bull Yamaha WCM	Yamaha	30	+1:36.743	5	4
13	14	(Australia) Anthony West	Dee Cee Jeans Racing Team	Honda	29	+1 lap	18	3
14	16	(Sweden) Johan Stigefelt	Sabre Sport	Sabre V4	29	+1 lap	21	2
15	21	(Netherlands) Barry Veneman	Dee Cee Jeans Racing Team	Honda	28	+2 laps	20	1
16	9	(United Kingdom) Leon Haslam	Shell Advance Honda	Honda	28	+2 laps	19	
17	10	(Spain) José Luis Cardoso	Antena 3 Yamaha d'Antin	Yamaha	26	+4 laps	16	
Ret	18	(Australia) Brendan Clarke	Shell Advance Honda	Honda	14	Retirement	22	
Ret	28	(Spain) Àlex Crivillé	Repsol YPF Honda Team	Honda	7	Accident	6	
Ret	41	(Japan) Noriyuki Haga	Red Bull Yamaha WCM	Yamaha	1	Accident	15	
Ret	12	(Japan) Haruchika Aoki	Arie Molenaar Racing	Honda	0	Accident	17	
Ret	65	(Italy) Loris Capirossi	West Honda Pons	Honda	0	Accident	4	
DNQ	37	(Spain) Miguel Tey	By Queroseno Racing	Honda		Did not qualify		

== 250 cc classification ==
The race was held in two parts as rain caused its interruption; race times from the two heats were added together to determine the final results.

Pos.	No.	Rider	Manufacturer	Laps	Time/Retired	Grid	Points
1	74	(Japan) Daijiro Kato	Honda	27	44:01.853	5	25
2	31	(Japan) Tetsuya Harada	Aprilia	27	+4.943	4	20
3	10	(Spain) Fonsi Nieto	Aprilia	27	+12.371	1	16
4	7	(Spain) Emilio Alzamora	Honda	27	+14.972	9	13
5	99	(United Kingdom) Jeremy McWilliams	Aprilia	27	+21.045	7	11
6	8	(Japan) Naoki Matsudo	Yamaha	27	+25.817	8	10
7	15	(Italy) Roberto Locatelli	Aprilia	27	+26.623	3	9
8	44	(Italy) Roberto Rolfo	Aprilia	27	+26.776	10	8
9	6	(Spain) Alex Debón	Aprilia	27	+35.372	2	7
10	81	(France) Randy de Puniet	Aprilia	27	+46.273	14	6
11	42	(Spain) David Checa	Honda	27	+47.766	13	5
12	18	(Malaysia) Shahrol Yuzy	Yamaha	27	+47.887	19	4
13	9	(Argentina) Sebastián Porto	Yamaha	27	+49.132	18	3
14	21	(Italy) Franco Battaini	Aprilia	27	+51.582	11	2
15	22	(Spain) José David de Gea	Yamaha	27	+52.052	16	1
16	50	(France) Sylvain Guintoli	Aprilia	27	+53.057	15	
17	46	(Japan) Taro Sekiguchi	Yamaha	27	+53.108	21	
18	20	(Spain) Jerónimo Vidal	Aprilia	27	+1:17.203	24	
19	11	(Italy) Riccardo Chiarello	Aprilia	27	+1:42.393	22	
20	38	(Spain) Álvaro Molina	Yamaha	27	+1:53.681	27	
21	23	(Brazil) César Barros	Yamaha	27	+2:07.720	28	
22	16	(Spain) David Tomás	Honda	27	+2:12.659	23	
23	45	(United Kingdom) Stuart Edwards	Yamaha	27	+2:14.370	30	
24	14	(Germany) Katja Poensgen	Honda	27	+2:23.258	29	
Ret	36	(Spain) Luis Costa	Yamaha	19	Retirement	26	
Ret	66	(Germany) Alex Hofmann	Aprilia	16	Retirement	12	
Ret	37	(Italy) Luca Boscoscuro	Aprilia	13	Retirement	20	
Ret	83	(Hungary) Gábor Rizmayer	Honda	9	Retirement	31	
Ret	57	(Italy) Lorenzo Lanzi	Aprilia	6	Retirement	17	
Ret	24	(United Kingdom) Jason Vincent	Yamaha	5	Retirement	25	
Ret	5	(Italy) Marco Melandri	Aprilia	3	Retirement	6	
DNQ	41	(Spain) Dámaso Nácher	Honda		Did not qualify		
DNQ	43	(Spain) Isaac Martín	Honda		Did not qualify		
DNQ	72	(Spain) Michael García	Aprilia		Did not qualify		
DNQ	12	(Germany) Klaus Nöhles	Aprilia		Did not qualify		

== 125 cc classification ==
Pos.	No.	Rider	Manufacturer	Laps	Time/Retired	Grid	Points
1	54	(San Marino) Manuel Poggiali	Gilera	25	42:45.422	12	25
2	24	(Spain) Toni Elías	Honda	25	+0.022	1	20
3	26	(Spain) Daniel Pedrosa	Honda	25	+0.263	8	16
4	41	(Japan) Youichi Ui	Derbi	25	+0.305	10	13
5	23	(Italy) Gino Borsoi	Aprilia	25	+0.561	6	11
6	16	(Italy) Simone Sanna	Aprilia	25	+0.586	2	10
7	17	(Germany) Steve Jenkner	Aprilia	25	+0.654	5	9
8	9	(Italy) Lucio Cecchinello	Aprilia	25	+1.596	3	8
9	11	(Italy) Max Sabbatani	Aprilia	25	+2.005	4	7
10	25	(Spain) Joan Olivé	Honda	25	+2.078	9	6
11	28	(Hungary) Gábor Talmácsi	Honda	25	+15.746	11	5
12	7	(Italy) Stefano Perugini	Italjet	25	+17.225	29	4
13	6	(Italy) Mirko Giansanti	Honda	25	+17.369	18	3
14	22	(Spain) Pablo Nieto	Derbi	25	+17.456	14	2
15	31	(Spain) Ángel Rodríguez	Aprilia	25	+17.709	19	1
16	29	(Spain) Ángel Nieto Jr.	Honda	25	+18.686	15	
17	34	(Andorra) Eric Bataille	Honda	25	+20.387	13	
18	21	(France) Arnaud Vincent	Honda	25	+20.537	16	
19	20	(Italy) Gaspare Caffiero	Aprilia	25	+21.800	28	
20	19	(Italy) Alessandro Brannetti	Aprilia	25	+24.857	24	
21	18	(Czech Republic) Jakub Smrž	Honda	25	+24.946	23	
22	8	(Italy) Gianluigi Scalvini	Italjet	25	+38.255	22	
23	4	(Japan) Masao Azuma	Honda	25	+38.692	20	
24	77	(Spain) Adrián Araujo	Honda	25	+42.858	34	
25	12	(Spain) Raúl Jara	Aprilia	25	+43.450	26	
26	30	(Germany) Jascha Büch	Honda	25	+1:01.078	30	
Ret	15	(San Marino) Alex de Angelis	Honda	24	Accident	21	
Ret	44	(Spain) Héctor Faubel	Aprilia	18	Retirement	17	
Ret	39	(Czech Republic) Jaroslav Huleš	Honda	14	Retirement	25	
Ret	45	(Spain) Javier Forés	Aprilia	14	Retirement	27	
Ret	75	(Italy) Fabrizio Lai	Rieju	11	Accident	31	
Ret	5	(Japan) Noboru Ueda	TSR-Honda	7	Accident	7	
Ret	37	(San Marino) William de Angelis	Honda	6	Retirement	33	
Ret	82	(Finland) Mika Kallio	Honda	4	Accident	32	

== Championship standings after the race (500cc) ==
Below are the standings for the top five riders and constructors after round twelve has concluded.

Riders' Championship standings

Pos.	Rider	Points
1	(Italy) Valentino Rossi	225
2	(Italy) Max Biaggi	183
3	(Italy) Loris Capirossi	147
4	(Brazil) Alex Barros	127
5	(Japan) Shinya Nakano	116

Constructors' Championship standings

Pos.	Constructor	Points
1	(Japan) Honda	267
2	(Japan) Yamaha	226
3	(Japan) Suzuki	126
4	(Malaysia) Proton KR	59
5	(United Kingdom) Sabre V4	6

- Note: Only the top five positions are included for both sets of standings.

Previous race: 2001 Portuguese Grand Prix	FIM Grand Prix World Championship; 2001 season	Next race: 2001 Pacific Grand Prix
Previous race: 2000 Valencian Grand Prix	Valencian Grand Prix	Next race: 2002 Valencian Grand Prix
