= 2001 Czech Republic motorcycle Grand Prix =

2001 Czech Republic Grand Prix
Race details
- Race 10 of 16 races in the 2001 Grand Prix motorcycle racing season
- Date: 26 August 2001
- Official name: Gauloises Grand Prix České republiky
- Location: Brno Circuit
- Course: Permanent racing facility; 5.403 km (3.357 mi)

500cc
Pole position
- Rider: (Italy) Max Biaggi
- Time: 2:00.347
Fastest lap
- Rider: (Italy) Valentino Rossi
- Time: 2:01.461 on lap 7
Podium
- First: (Italy) Valentino Rossi
- Second: (Spain) Àlex Crivillé
- Third: (Italy) Loris Capirossi

250cc
Pole position
- Rider: (Japan) Tetsuya Harada
- Time: 2:02.953
Fastest lap
- Rider: (Italy) Marco Melandri
- Time: 2:03.836 on lap 5
Podium
- First: (Japan) Tetsuya Harada
- Second: (Italy) Marco Melandri
- Third: (Japan) Daijiro Kato

125cc
Pole position
- Rider: (Spain) Toni Elías
- Time: 2:09.062
Fastest lap
- Rider: (Czech Republic) Jaroslav Huleš
- Time: 2:09.648 on lap 8
Podium
- First: (Spain) Toni Elías
- Second: (Italy) Lucio Cecchinello
- Third: (Germany) Steve Jenkner

The 2001 Czech Republic motorcycle Grand Prix was the tenth round of the 2001 Grand Prix motorcycle racing season. It took place on the weekend of 24–26 August 2001 at the Masaryk Circuit.

This race was the final podium for 1999 500cc world champion Àlex Crivillé.

== 500 cc classification ==
Pos.	No.	Rider	Team	Manufacturer	Laps	Time/Retired	Grid	Points
1	46	(Italy) Valentino Rossi	Nastro Azzurro Honda	Honda	22	45:01.044	2	25
2	28	(Spain) Àlex Crivillé	Repsol YPF Honda Team	Honda	22	+3.374	8	20
3	65	(Italy) Loris Capirossi	West Honda Pons	Honda	22	+3.767	3	16
4	6	(Japan) Norifumi Abe	Antena 3 Yamaha d'Antin	Yamaha	22	+4.057	11	13
5	11	(Japan) Tohru Ukawa	Repsol YPF Honda Team	Honda	22	+6.574	13	11
6	5	(Australia) Garry McCoy	Red Bull Yamaha WCM	Yamaha	22	+7.344	5	10
7	7	(Spain) Carlos Checa	Marlboro Yamaha Team	Yamaha	22	+10.689	7	9
8	15	(Spain) Sete Gibernau	Telefónica Movistar Suzuki	Suzuki	22	+15.201	10	8
9	4	(Brazil) Alex Barros	West Honda Pons	Honda	22	+24.732	9	7
10	3	(Italy) Max Biaggi	Marlboro Yamaha Team	Yamaha	22	+29.758	1	6
11	41	(Japan) Noriyuki Haga	Red Bull Yamaha WCM	Yamaha	22	+42.667	15	5
12	19	(France) Olivier Jacque	Gauloises Yamaha Tech 3	Yamaha	22	+43.063	12	4
13	10	(Spain) José Luis Cardoso	Antena 3 Yamaha d'Antin	Yamaha	22	+56.432	14	3
14	12	(Japan) Haruchika Aoki	Arie Molenaar Racing	Honda	22	+1:13.315	17	2
15	16	(Sweden) Johan Stigefelt	Sabre Sport	Sabre V4	22	+2:03.200	19	1
16	21	(Netherlands) Barry Veneman	Dee Cee Jeans Racing Team	Honda	22	+2:07.065	21	
Ret	1	(United States) Kenny Roberts Jr.	Telefónica Movistar Suzuki	Suzuki	15	Retirement	6	
Ret	14	(Australia) Anthony West	Dee Cee Jeans Racing Team	Honda	14	Retirement	18	
Ret	9	(United Kingdom) Leon Haslam	Shell Advance Honda	Honda	9	Accident	16	
Ret	17	(Netherlands) Jurgen van den Goorbergh	Proton Team KR	Proton KR	8	Retirement	4	
Ret	18	(Australia) Brendan Clarke	Shell Advance Honda	Honda	5	Retirement	20	
Ret	25	(Australia) Shaun Geronimi	Paton Grand Prix	Paton	5	Retirement	22	
DNS	56	(Japan) Shinya Nakano	Gauloises Yamaha Tech 3	Yamaha		Did not start		

== 250 cc classification ==
Pos.	No.	Rider	Manufacturer	Laps	Time/Retired	Grid	Points
1	31	(Japan) Tetsuya Harada	Aprilia	20	41:32.599	1	25
2	5	(Italy) Marco Melandri	Aprilia	20	+2.743	4	20
3	74	(Japan) Daijiro Kato	Honda	20	+2.797	2	16
4	10	(Spain) Fonsi Nieto	Aprilia	20	+31.315	5	13
5	44	(Italy) Roberto Rolfo	Aprilia	20	+32.569	11	11
6	81	(France) Randy de Puniet	Aprilia	20	+33.823	10	10
7	7	(Spain) Emilio Alzamora	Honda	20	+35.171	6	9
8	9	(Argentina) Sebastián Porto	Yamaha	20	+35.386	8	8
9	8	(Japan) Naoki Matsudo	Yamaha	20	+35.663	13	7
10	6	(Spain) Alex Debón	Aprilia	20	+41.559	7	6
11	12	(Germany) Klaus Nöhles	Aprilia	20	+46.303	18	5
12	15	(Italy) Roberto Locatelli	Aprilia	20	+46.613	9	4
13	50	(France) Sylvain Guintoli	Aprilia	20	+49.736	19	3
14	21	(Italy) Franco Battaini	Aprilia	20	+50.375	12	2
15	57	(Italy) Lorenzo Lanzi	Aprilia	20	+51.492	22	1
16	46	(Japan) Taro Sekiguchi	Yamaha	20	+56.553	15	
17	37	(Italy) Luca Boscoscuro	Aprilia	20	+56.605	14	
18	42	(Spain) David Checa	Honda	20	+1:02.337	16	
19	22	(Spain) José David de Gea	Yamaha	20	+1:17.395	24	
20	11	(Italy) Riccardo Chiarello	Aprilia	20	+1:17.512	26	
21	16	(Spain) David Tomás	Honda	20	+1:17.734	25	
22	20	(Spain) Jerónimo Vidal	Aprilia	20	+1:17.840	23	
23	24	(United Kingdom) Jason Vincent	Yamaha	20	+1:18.157	20	
24	36	(Spain) Luis Costa	Yamaha	20	+1:34.555	27	
25	83	(Hungary) Gábor Rizmayer	Honda	20	+1:59.296	28	
26	62	(United States) Jason DiSalvo	Honda	19	+1 lap	31	
27	79	(Germany) Norman Rank	Honda	19	+1 lap	33	
28	23	(Brazil) César Barros	Yamaha	19	+1 lap	29	
Ret	18	(Malaysia) Shahrol Yuzy	Yamaha	14	Accident	21	
Ret	99	(United Kingdom) Jeremy McWilliams	Aprilia	13	Retirement	3	
Ret	80	(Slovakia) Vladimír Častka	Yamaha	7	Accident	30	
Ret	45	(United Kingdom) Stuart Edwards	Honda	5	Retirement	32	
DNS	66	(Germany) Alex Hofmann	Aprilia	0	Did not start	17	
DNQ	82	(Germany) Henrik Voit	Honda		Did not qualify		

== 125 cc classification ==
Pos.	No.	Rider	Manufacturer	Laps	Time/Retired	Grid	Points
1	24	(Spain) Toni Elías	Honda	19	41:27.703	1	25
2	9	(Italy) Lucio Cecchinello	Aprilia	19	+0.689	3	20
3	17	(Germany) Steve Jenkner	Aprilia	19	+1.086	6	16
4	41	(Japan) Youichi Ui	Derbi	19	+1.156	2	13
5	11	(Italy) Max Sabbatani	Aprilia	19	+3.668	9	11
6	18	(Czech Republic) Jakub Smrž	Honda	19	+7.804	5	10
7	39	(Czech Republic) Jaroslav Huleš	Honda	19	+7.817	10	9
8	26	(Spain) Daniel Pedrosa	Honda	19	+7.985	13	8
9	28	(Hungary) Gábor Talmácsi	Honda	19	+8.528	8	7
10	16	(Italy) Simone Sanna	Aprilia	19	+13.875	4	6
11	5	(Japan) Noboru Ueda	TSR-Honda	19	+20.490	7	5
12	15	(San Marino) Alex de Angelis	Honda	19	+25.982	21	4
13	4	(Japan) Masao Azuma	Honda	19	+26.127	12	3
14	25	(Spain) Joan Olivé	Honda	19	+30.135	22	2
15	34	(Andorra) Eric Bataille	Honda	19	+30.593	23	1
16	6	(Italy) Mirko Giansanti	Honda	19	+30.738	15	
17	31	(Spain) Ángel Rodríguez	Aprilia	19	+30.954	17	
18	22	(Spain) Pablo Nieto	Derbi	19	+31.290	19	
19	29	(Spain) Ángel Nieto Jr.	Honda	19	+32.111	14	
20	19	(Italy) Alessandro Brannetti	Aprilia	19	+45.231	20	
21	20	(Italy) Gaspare Caffiero	Aprilia	19	+58.341	27	
22	77	(Spain) Adrián Araujo	Honda	19	+1:10.907	33	
23	23	(Italy) Gino Borsoi	Aprilia	19	+1:10.918	28	
24	30	(Germany) Jascha Büch	Honda	19	+1:11.480	30	
25	80	(Germany) Tobias Kirmeier	Honda	19	+1:11.692	31	
26	84	(Czech Republic) Igor Kaláb	Honda	19	+1:11.984	32	
27	96	(Czech Republic) Matěj Smrž	Aprilia	19	+1:12.105	29	
28	83	(Czech Republic) Václav Bittman	Honda	19	+1:12.660	34	
29	85	(Czech Republic) Tomáš Mikšovský	Honda	19	+1:12.749	35	
Ret	7	(Italy) Stefano Perugini	Italjet	17	Accident	18	
Ret	27	(Italy) Marco Petrini	Honda	13	Retirement	24	
Ret	54	(San Marino) Manuel Poggiali	Gilera	11	Accident	11	
Ret	21	(France) Arnaud Vincent	Honda	11	Accident	16	
Ret	12	(Spain) Raúl Jara	Aprilia	8	Retirement	25	
Ret	8	(Italy) Gianluigi Scalvini	Italjet	4	Retirement	26	

== Championship standings after the race (500cc) ==
Below are the standings for the top five riders and constructors after round ten has concluded.

Riders' Championship standings

Pos.	Rider	Points
1	(Italy) Valentino Rossi	195
2	(Italy) Max Biaggi	166
3	(Italy) Loris Capirossi	127
4	(Brazil) Alex Barros	107
5	(Japan) Norifumi Abe	100

Constructors' Championship standings

Pos.	Constructor	Points
1	(Japan) Honda	222
2	(Japan) Yamaha	197
3	(Japan) Suzuki	91
4	(Malaysia) Proton KR	43
5	(New Zealand) Pulse	3

- Note: Only the top five positions are included for both sets of standings.

Previous race: 2001 German Grand Prix	FIM Grand Prix World Championship; 2001 season	Next race: 2001 Portuguese Grand Prix
Previous race: 2000 Czech Republic Grand Prix	Czech Republic Grand Prix	Next race: 2002 Czech Republic Grand Prix
