= 2001 Pacific motorcycle Grand Prix =

(Tochigi Prefecture) 2001 Pacific Grand Prix
Race details
- Race 13 of 16 races in the 2001 Grand Prix motorcycle racing season
- Date: 7 October 2001
- Official name: Pacific Grand Prix of Motegi
- Location: Twin Ring Motegi
- Course: Permanent racing facility; 4.801 km (2.983 mi)

500cc
Pole position
- Rider: (Italy) Loris Capirossi
- Time: 1:49.800
Fastest lap
- Rider: (Italy) Valentino Rossi
- Time: 1:51.030 on lap 13
Podium
- First: (Italy) Valentino Rossi
- Second: (Brazil) Alex Barros
- Third: (Italy) Loris Capirossi

250cc
Pole position
- Rider: (Japan) Tetsuya Harada
- Time: 1:52.789
Fastest lap
- Rider: (Japan) Tetsuya Harada
- Time: 1:53.767 on lap 12
Podium
- First: (Japan) Tetsuya Harada
- Second: (Spain) Emilio Alzamora
- Third: (United Kingdom) Jeremy McWilliams

125cc
Pole position
- Rider: (Japan) Youichi Ui
- Time: 1:58.603
Fastest lap
- Rider: (Japan) Youichi Ui
- Time: 1:59.010 on lap 9
Podium
- First: (Japan) Youichi Ui
- Second: (San Marino) Manuel Poggiali
- Third: (Spain) Daniel Pedrosa

The 2001 Pacific motorcycle Grand Prix was the thirteenth round of the 2001 Grand Prix motorcycle racing season. It took place on the weekend of 5–7 October 2001 at the Twin Ring Motegi.

== 500 cc classification ==
Pos.	No.	Rider	Team	Manufacturer	Laps	Time/Retired	Grid	Points
1	46	(Italy) Valentino Rossi	Nastro Azzurro Honda	Honda	25	46:32.600	4	25
2	4	(Brazil) Alex Barros	West Honda Pons	Honda	25	+2.607	3	20
3	65	(Italy) Loris Capirossi	West Honda Pons	Honda	25	+9.765	1	16
4	6	(Japan) Norifumi Abe	Antena 3 Yamaha d'Antin	Yamaha	25	+13.951	16	13
5	11	(Japan) Tohru Ukawa	Repsol YPF Honda Team	Honda	25	+21.994	9	11
6	56	(Japan) Shinya Nakano	Gauloises Yamaha Tech 3	Yamaha	25	+22.279	5	10
7	7	(Spain) Carlos Checa	Marlboro Yamaha Team	Yamaha	25	+27.332	11	9
8	1	(United States) Kenny Roberts Jr.	Telefónica Movistar Suzuki	Suzuki	25	+27.607	6	8
9	15	(Spain) Sete Gibernau	Telefónica Movistar Suzuki	Suzuki	25	+33.822	7	7
10	64	(Japan) Yukio Kagayama	Telefónica Movistar Suzuki	Suzuki	25	+38.139	14	6
11	28	(Spain) Àlex Crivillé	Repsol YPF Honda Team	Honda	25	+41.866	12	5
12	5	(Australia) Garry McCoy	Red Bull Yamaha WCM	Yamaha	25	+50.419	13	4
13	10	(Spain) José Luis Cardoso	Antena 3 Yamaha d'Antin	Yamaha	25	+56.204	17	3
14	14	(Australia) Anthony West	Dee Cee Jeans Racing Team	Honda	25	+1:05.286	18	2
15	9	(United Kingdom) Leon Haslam	Shell Advance Honda	Honda	24	+1 lap	20	1
16	21	(Netherlands) Barry Veneman	Dee Cee Jeans Racing Team	Honda	24	+1 lap	22	
17	18	(Australia) Brendan Clarke	Shell Advance Honda	Honda	24	+1 lap	23	
Ret	19	(France) Olivier Jacque	Gauloises Yamaha Tech 3	Yamaha	18	Retirement	8	
Ret	17	(Netherlands) Jurgen van den Goorbergh	Proton Team KR	Proton KR	8	Retirement	10	
Ret	12	(Japan) Haruchika Aoki	Arie Molenaar Racing	Honda	7	Accident	19	
Ret	41	(Japan) Noriyuki Haga	Red Bull Yamaha WCM	Yamaha	6	Accident	15	
Ret	3	(Italy) Max Biaggi	Marlboro Yamaha Team	Yamaha	5	Accident	2	
Ret	16	(Sweden) Johan Stigefelt	Sabre Sport	Sabre V4	4	Retirement	21	

== 250 cc classification ==
Pos.	No.	Rider	Manufacturer	Laps	Time/Retired	Grid	Points
1	31	(Japan) Tetsuya Harada	Aprilia	23	43:59.587	1	25
2	7	(Spain) Emilio Alzamora	Honda	23	+7.559	5	20
3	99	(United Kingdom) Jeremy McWilliams	Aprilia	23	+8.024	4	16
4	10	(Spain) Fonsi Nieto	Aprilia	23	+11.462	6	13
5	44	(Italy) Roberto Rolfo	Aprilia	23	+11.733	8	11
6	15	(Italy) Roberto Locatelli	Aprilia	23	+13.498	9	10
7	8	(Japan) Naoki Matsudo	Yamaha	23	+19.937	10	9
8	21	(Italy) Franco Battaini	Aprilia	23	+24.789	13	8
9	46	(Japan) Taro Sekiguchi	Yamaha	23	+26.671	16	7
10	88	(Japan) Nobuyuki Ohsaki	Yamaha	23	+33.671	17	6
11	81	(France) Randy de Puniet	Aprilia	23	+37.114	7	5
12	42	(Spain) David Checa	Honda	23	+40.478	15	4
13	89	(Japan) Osamu Miyazaki	Yamaha	23	+41.670	20	3
14	16	(Spain) David Tomás	Honda	23	+42.139	23	2
15	57	(Italy) Lorenzo Lanzi	Aprilia	23	+42.568	22	1
16	50	(France) Sylvain Guintoli	Aprilia	23	+42.806	24	
17	66	(Germany) Alex Hofmann	Aprilia	23	+43.379	21	
18	6	(Spain) Alex Debón	Aprilia	23	+45.790	11	
19	18	(Malaysia) Shahrol Yuzy	Yamaha	23	+46.181	12	
20	90	(Japan) Daisaku Sakai	Honda	23	+48.361	26	
21	92	(Japan) Hiroshi Aoyama	Honda	23	+48.507	19	
22	24	(United Kingdom) Jason Vincent	Yamaha	23	+1:16.106	29	
23	11	(Italy) Riccardo Chiarello	Aprilia	23	+1:33.167	30	
24	36	(Spain) Luis Costa	Yamaha	23	+1:53.607	31	
25	55	(Italy) Diego Giugovaz	Aprilia	22	+1 lap	33	
26	14	(Germany) Katja Poensgen	Honda	22	+1 lap	35	
Ret	37	(Italy) Luca Boscoscuro	Aprilia	13	Retirement	18	
Ret	23	(Brazil) César Barros	Yamaha	11	Retirement	32	
Ret	5	(Italy) Marco Melandri	Aprilia	5	Accident	3	
Ret	74	(Japan) Daijiro Kato	Honda	5	Accident	2	
Ret	45	(United Kingdom) Stuart Edwards	Yamaha	4	Accident	34	
Ret	22	(Spain) José David de Gea	Yamaha	3	Retirement	25	
Ret	9	(Argentina) Sebastián Porto	Yamaha	3	Retirement	14	
Ret	20	(Spain) Jerónimo Vidal	Aprilia	2	Retirement	28	
Ret	91	(Japan) Takayuki Onodera	Yamaha	0	Retirement	27	

== 125 cc classification ==
Pos.	No.	Rider	Manufacturer	Laps	Time/Retired	Grid	Points
1	41	(Japan) Youichi Ui	Derbi	21	42:01.711	1	25
2	54	(San Marino) Manuel Poggiali	Gilera	21	+1.004	2	20
3	26	(Spain) Daniel Pedrosa	Honda	21	+1.129	7	16
4	9	(Italy) Lucio Cecchinello	Aprilia	21	+12.109	5	13
5	4	(Japan) Masao Azuma	Honda	21	+23.147	3	11
6	28	(Hungary) Gábor Talmácsi	Honda	21	+28.345	9	10
7	6	(Italy) Mirko Giansanti	Honda	21	+28.387	6	9
8	23	(Italy) Gino Borsoi	Aprilia	21	+29.678	17	8
9	8	(Italy) Gianluigi Scalvini	Italjet	21	+29.898	13	7
10	19	(Italy) Alessandro Brannetti	Aprilia	21	+30.026	20	6
11	12	(Spain) Raúl Jara	Aprilia	21	+30.268	15	5
12	25	(Spain) Joan Olivé	Honda	21	+35.692	31	4
13	29	(Spain) Ángel Nieto Jr.	Honda	21	+35.894	21	3
14	39	(Czech Republic) Jaroslav Huleš	Honda	21	+36.170	29	2
15	31	(Spain) Ángel Rodríguez	Aprilia	21	+45.438	28	1
16	22	(Spain) Pablo Nieto	Derbi	21	+45.543	27	
17	20	(Italy) Gaspare Caffiero	Aprilia	21	+45.997	16	
18	65	(Japan) Toshihisa Kuzuhara	Honda	21	+1:10.144	33	
19	10	(Germany) Jarno Müller	Honda	21	+1:14.335	34	
20	37	(San Marino) William de Angelis	Honda	21	+1:14.887	30	
21	77	(Spain) Adrián Araujo	Honda	21	+1:29.415	35	
Ret	16	(Italy) Simone Sanna	Aprilia	13	Retirement	24	
Ret	34	(Andorra) Eric Bataille	Honda	11	Retirement	32	
Ret	56	(Japan) Yuzo Fujioka	Honda	6	Accident	18	
Ret	64	(Japan) Yuki Takahashi	E-NER	5	Accident	11	
Ret	15	(San Marino) Alex de Angelis	Honda	5	Accident	12	
Ret	24	(Spain) Toni Elías	Honda	4	Accident	4	
Ret	5	(Japan) Noboru Ueda	TSR-Honda	4	Accident	8	
Ret	11	(Italy) Max Sabbatani	Aprilia	4	Accident	10	
Ret	55	(Japan) Hideyuki Nakajoh	Honda	2	Retirement	19	
Ret	21	(France) Arnaud Vincent	Honda	1	Accident	22	
Ret	17	(Germany) Steve Jenkner	Aprilia	0	Accident	14	
Ret	18	(Czech Republic) Jakub Smrž	Honda	0	Accident	23	
Ret	66	(Japan) Shuhei Aoyama	Honda	0	Accident	26	
Ret	7	(Italy) Stefano Perugini	Italjet	0	Accident	25	

== Championship standings after the race (500cc) ==
Below are the standings for the top five riders and constructors after round thirteen has concluded.

Riders' Championship standings

Pos.	Rider	Points
1	(Italy) Valentino Rossi	250
2	(Italy) Max Biaggi	183
3	(Italy) Loris Capirossi	163
4	(Brazil) Alex Barros	147
5	(Japan) Shinya Nakano	126

Constructors' Championship standings

Pos.	Constructor	Points
1	(Japan) Honda	292
2	(Japan) Yamaha	239
3	(Japan) Suzuki	134
4	(Malaysia) Proton KR	59
5	(United Kingdom) Sabre V4	6

- Note: Only the top five positions are included for both sets of standings.

Previous race: 2001 Valencian Grand Prix	FIM Grand Prix World Championship; 2001 season	Next race: 2001 Australian Grand Prix
Previous race: 2000 Pacific Grand Prix	Pacific Grand Prix	Next race: 2002 Pacific Grand Prix
