= 2001 Australian motorcycle Grand Prix =

(Australia) 2001 Australian Grand Prix
Race details
- Race 14 of 16 races in the 2001 Grand Prix motorcycle racing season
- Date: 14 October 2001
- Official name: Qantas Australian Grand Prix
- Location: Phillip Island Grand Prix Circuit
- Course: Permanent racing facility; 4.448 km (2.764 mi)

500cc
Pole position
- Rider: (Italy) Max Biaggi
- Time: 1:31.984
Fastest lap
- Rider: (Italy) Max Biaggi
- Time: 1:32.993 on lap 16
Podium
- First: (Italy) Valentino Rossi
- Second: (Italy) Max Biaggi
- Third: (Italy) Loris Capirossi

250cc
Pole position
- Rider: (Japan) Tetsuya Harada
- Time: 1:33.625
Fastest lap
- Rider: (Japan) Daijiro Kato
- Time: 1:34.560 on lap 7
Podium
- First: (Japan) Daijiro Kato
- Second: (Japan) Tetsuya Harada
- Third: (Italy) Roberto Rolfo

125cc
Pole position
- Rider: (San Marino) Manuel Poggiali
- Time: 1:37.737
Fastest lap
- Rider: (Italy) Max Sabbatani
- Time: 1:38.499 on lap 5
Podium
- First: (Japan) Youichi Ui
- Second: (San Marino) Manuel Poggiali
- Third: (Spain) Toni Elías

The 2001 Australian motorcycle Grand Prix was the fourteenth round of the 2001 Grand Prix motorcycle racing season. It took place on the weekend of 12–14 October 2001 at the Phillip Island Grand Prix Circuit.

== 500 cc classification ==
Pos.	No.	Rider	Team	Manufacturer	Laps	Time/Retired	Grid	Points
1	46	(Italy) Valentino Rossi	Nastro Azzurro Honda	Honda	27	42:22.383	2	25
2	3	(Italy) Max Biaggi	Marlboro Yamaha Team	Yamaha	27	+0.013	1	20
3	65	(Italy) Loris Capirossi	West Honda Pons	Honda	27	+0.581	6	16
4	4	(Brazil) Alex Barros	West Honda Pons	Honda	27	+0.714	3	13
5	11	(Japan) Tohru Ukawa	Repsol YPF Honda Team	Honda	27	+1.288	8	11
6	19	(France) Olivier Jacque	Gauloises Yamaha Tech 3	Yamaha	27	+2.534	5	10
7	56	(Japan) Shinya Nakano	Gauloises Yamaha Tech 3	Yamaha	27	+2.579	9	9
8	41	(Japan) Noriyuki Haga	Red Bull Yamaha WCM	Yamaha	27	+2.582	11	8
9	15	(Spain) Sete Gibernau	Telefónica Movistar Suzuki	Suzuki	27	+2.832	4	7
10	17	(Netherlands) Jurgen van den Goorbergh	Proton Team KR	Proton KR	27	+19.443	15	6
11	28	(Spain) Àlex Crivillé	Repsol YPF Honda Team	Honda	27	+20.000	13	5
12	14	(Australia) Anthony West	Dee Cee Jeans Racing Team	Honda	27	+20.303	16	4
13	6	(Japan) Norifumi Abe	Antena 3 Yamaha d'Antin	Yamaha	27	+21.043	10	3
14	12	(Japan) Haruchika Aoki	Arie Molenaar Racing	Honda	27	+21.360	17	2
15	1	(United States) Kenny Roberts Jr.	Telefónica Movistar Suzuki	Suzuki	27	+29.738	12	1
16	7	(Spain) Carlos Checa	Marlboro Yamaha Team	Yamaha	27	+30.023	7	
17	16	(Sweden) Johan Stigefelt	Sabre Sport	Sabre V4	27	+1:18.349	19	
18	21	(Netherlands) Barry Veneman	Dee Cee Jeans Racing Team	Honda	27	+1:24.773	21	
19	9	(United Kingdom) Leon Haslam	Shell Advance Honda	Honda	27	+1:24.848	20	
20	18	(Australia) Brendan Clarke	Shell Advance Honda	Honda	26	+1 lap	22	
Ret	5	(Australia) Garry McCoy	Red Bull Yamaha WCM	Yamaha	18	Retirement	14	
Ret	10	(Spain) José Luis Cardoso	Antena 3 Yamaha d'Antin	Yamaha	6	Retirement	18	

== 250 cc classification ==
Pos.	No.	Rider	Manufacturer	Laps	Time/Retired	Grid	Points
1	74	(Japan) Daijiro Kato	Honda	25	39:48.180	3	25
2	31	(Japan) Tetsuya Harada	Aprilia	25	+5.644	1	20
3	44	(Italy) Roberto Rolfo	Aprilia	25	+8.518	11	16
4	99	(United Kingdom) Jeremy McWilliams	Aprilia	25	+14.303	2	13
5	10	(Spain) Fonsi Nieto	Aprilia	25	+14.389	5	11
6	7	(Spain) Emilio Alzamora	Honda	25	+14.749	10	10
7	15	(Italy) Roberto Locatelli	Aprilia	25	+17.546	4	9
8	37	(Italy) Luca Boscoscuro	Aprilia	25	+37.456	17	8
9	8	(Japan) Naoki Matsudo	Yamaha	25	+50.872	15	7
10	18	(Malaysia) Shahrol Yuzy	Yamaha	25	+53.951	19	6
11	57	(Italy) Lorenzo Lanzi	Aprilia	25	+1:00.113	13	5
12	46	(Japan) Taro Sekiguchi	Yamaha	25	+1:10.314	18	4
13	11	(Italy) Riccardo Chiarello	Aprilia	25	+1:34.981	26	3
14	16	(Spain) David Tomás	Honda	25	+1:39.355	22	2
15	20	(Spain) Jerónimo Vidal	Aprilia	24	+1 lap	21	1
16	23	(Brazil) César Barros	Yamaha	24	+1 lap	25	
17	55	(Italy) Diego Giugovaz	Aprilia	24	+1 lap	23	
18	36	(Spain) Luis Costa	Yamaha	24	+1 lap	28	
19	14	(Germany) Katja Poensgen	Honda	24	+1 lap	30	
20	45	(United Kingdom) Stuart Edwards	Yamaha	24	+1 lap	29	
Ret	6	(Spain) Alex Debón	Aprilia	22	Retirement	20	
Ret	22	(Spain) José David de Gea	Yamaha	18	Accident	16	
Ret	96	(Australia) Mark Rowling	Yamaha	17	Retirement	31	
Ret	66	(Germany) Alex Hofmann	Aprilia	14	Accident	7	
Ret	50	(France) Sylvain Guintoli	Aprilia	14	Retirement	14	
Ret	95	(Australia) Shane Smith	Honda	12	Retirement	32	
Ret	24	(United Kingdom) Jason Vincent	Yamaha	1	Retirement	24	
Ret	21	(Italy) Franco Battaini	Aprilia	0	Retirement	6	
Ret	42	(Spain) David Checa	Honda	0	Accident	9	
Ret	81	(France) Randy de Puniet	Aprilia	0	Accident	12	
Ret	9	(Argentina) Sebastián Porto	Yamaha	0	Accident	8	
DNS	97	(Australia) Josh Brookes	Yamaha	0	Did not start	27	
DNS	5	(Italy) Marco Melandri	Aprilia		Did not start		
DNQ	93	(Australia) Earl Lynch	Yamaha		Did not qualify		
DNQ	94	(Australia) Terry Carter	Yamaha		Did not qualify		

== 125 cc classification ==
Pos.	No.	Rider	Manufacturer	Laps	Time/Retired	Grid	Points
1	41	(Japan) Youichi Ui	Derbi	23	38:14.688	3	25
2	54	(San Marino) Manuel Poggiali	Gilera	23	+4.709	1	20
3	24	(Spain) Toni Elías	Honda	23	+4.743	17	16
4	4	(Japan) Masao Azuma	Honda	23	+4.938	14	13
5	9	(Italy) Lucio Cecchinello	Aprilia	23	+4.974	2	11
6	15	(San Marino) Alex de Angelis	Honda	23	+5.053	6	10
7	26	(Spain) Daniel Pedrosa	Honda	23	+5.562	11	9
8	11	(Italy) Max Sabbatani	Aprilia	23	+5.881	21	8
9	34	(Andorra) Eric Bataille	Honda	23	+9.506	23	7
10	23	(Italy) Gino Borsoi	Aprilia	23	+17.165	4	6
11	5	(Japan) Noboru Ueda	TSR-Honda	23	+17.289	5	5
12	73	(Australia) Casey Stoner	Honda	23	+17.372	19	4
13	29	(Spain) Ángel Nieto Jr.	Honda	23	+18.361	10	3
14	39	(Czech Republic) Jaroslav Huleš	Honda	23	+18.375	12	2
15	20	(Italy) Gaspare Caffiero	Aprilia	23	+18.447	16	1
16	7	(Italy) Stefano Perugini	Italjet	23	+19.742	8	
17	17	(Germany) Steve Jenkner	Aprilia	23	+26.857	18	
18	8	(Italy) Gianluigi Scalvini	Italjet	23	+26.892	15	
19	18	(Czech Republic) Jakub Smrž	Honda	23	+26.916	20	
20	22	(Spain) Pablo Nieto	Derbi	23	+31.486	26	
21	21	(France) Arnaud Vincent	Honda	23	+31.819	9	
22	19	(Italy) Alessandro Brannetti	Aprilia	23	+35.783	30	
23	31	(Spain) Ángel Rodríguez	Aprilia	23	+35.998	13	
24	12	(Spain) Raúl Jara	Aprilia	23	+42.581	24	
25	10	(Germany) Jarno Müller	Honda	23	+49.404	28	
26	91	(Australia) Jay Taylor	Honda	23	+49.494	29	
27	25	(Spain) Joan Olivé	Honda	23	+54.747	22	
28	28	(Hungary) Gábor Talmácsi	Honda	23	+1:13.148	27	
29	37	(San Marino) William de Angelis	Honda	23	+1:13.174	31	
Ret	16	(Italy) Simone Sanna	Aprilia	22	Accident	7	
Ret	92	(Australia) Peter Galvin	Honda	14	Accident	33	
Ret	94	(Australia) Cath Thompson	Honda	12	Accident	34	
Ret	6	(Italy) Mirko Giansanti	Honda	11	Retirement	25	
Ret	77	(Spain) Adrián Araujo	Honda	1	Retirement	32	
DNQ	93	(Australia) Andrew Brooks	Honda		Did not qualify		

== Championship standings after the race (500cc) ==
Below are the standings for the top five riders and constructors after round fourteen has concluded.

Riders' Championship standings

Pos.	Rider	Points
1	(Italy) Valentino Rossi	275
2	(Italy) Max Biaggi	203
3	(Italy) Loris Capirossi	179
4	(Brazil) Alex Barros	160
5	(Japan) Shinya Nakano	135

Constructors' Championship standings

Pos.	Constructor	Points
1	(Japan) Honda	317
2	(Japan) Yamaha	259
3	(Japan) Suzuki	141
4	(Malaysia) Proton KR	65
5	(United Kingdom) Sabre V4	6

- Note: Only the top five positions are included for both sets of standings.

Previous race: 2001 Pacific Grand Prix	FIM Grand Prix World Championship; 2001 season	Next race: 2001 Malaysian Grand Prix
Previous race: 2000 Australian Grand Prix	Australian Grand Prix	Next race: 2002 Australian Grand Prix
