= 2001 Malaysian motorcycle Grand Prix =

(Malaysia) 2001 Malaysian Grand Prix
Race details
- Race 15 of 16 races in the 2001 Grand Prix motorcycle racing season
- Date: 21 October 2001
- Official name: Malaysian Grand Prix
- Location: Sepang International Circuit
- Course: Permanent racing facility; 5.543 km (3.444 mi)

500cc
Pole position
- Rider: (Italy) Loris Capirossi
- Time: 2:05.637
Fastest lap
- Rider: (Italy) Valentino Rossi
- Time: 2:06.618 on lap 13
Podium
- First: (Italy) Valentino Rossi
- Second: (Italy) Loris Capirossi
- Third: (Australia) Garry McCoy

250cc
Pole position
- Rider: (Japan) Daijiro Kato
- Time: 2:08.151
Fastest lap
- Rider: (Japan) Daijiro Kato
- Time: 2:08.920 on lap 2
Podium
- First: (Japan) Daijiro Kato
- Second: (Japan) Tetsuya Harada
- Third: (Spain) Fonsi Nieto

125cc
Pole position
- Rider: (Spain) Toni Elías
- Time: 2:15.358
Fastest lap
- Rider: (Japan) Youichi Ui
- Time: 2:14.961 on lap 7
Podium
- First: (Japan) Youichi Ui
- Second: (San Marino) Manuel Poggiali
- Third: (Italy) Lucio Cecchinello

The 2001 Malaysian motorcycle Grand Prix was the fifteenth round of the 2001 Grand Prix motorcycle racing season. It took place on the weekend of 19–21 October 2001 at the Sepang International Circuit.

== 500 cc classification ==
Pos.	No.	Rider	Team	Manufacturer	Laps	Time/Retired	Grid	Points
1	46	(Italy) Valentino Rossi	Nastro Azzurro Honda	Honda	21	44:46.652	2	25
2	65	(Italy) Loris Capirossi	West Honda Pons	Honda	21	+3.551	1	20
3	5	(Australia) Garry McCoy	Red Bull Yamaha WCM	Yamaha	21	+4.722	4	16
4	56	(Japan) Shinya Nakano	Gauloises Yamaha Tech 3	Yamaha	21	+5.005	6	13
5	11	(Japan) Tohru Ukawa	Repsol YPF Honda Team	Honda	21	+8.807	12	11
6	28	(Spain) Àlex Crivillé	Repsol YPF Honda Team	Honda	21	+12.192	11	10
7	4	(Brazil) Alex Barros	West Honda Pons	Honda	21	+15.682	5	9
8	15	(Spain) Sete Gibernau	Telefónica Movistar Suzuki	Suzuki	21	+18.772	8	8
9	41	(Japan) Noriyuki Haga	Red Bull Yamaha WCM	Yamaha	21	+27.012	14	7
10	7	(Spain) Carlos Checa	Marlboro Yamaha Team	Yamaha	21	+28.829	13	6
11	10	(Spain) José Luis Cardoso	Antena 3 Yamaha d'Antin	Yamaha	21	+29.007	16	5
12	14	(Australia) Anthony West	Dee Cee Jeans Racing Team	Honda	21	+1:02.166	18	4
13	6	(Japan) Norifumi Abe	Antena 3 Yamaha d'Antin	Yamaha	21	+1:20.535	10	3
14	18	(Australia) Brendan Clarke	Shell Advance Honda	Honda	21	+2:04.455	22	2
15	9	(United Kingdom) Leon Haslam	Shell Advance Honda	Honda	21	+2:04.500	20	1
Ret	19	(France) Olivier Jacque	Gauloises Yamaha Tech 3	Yamaha	12	Accident	7	
Ret	21	(Netherlands) Barry Veneman	Dee Cee Jeans Racing Team	Honda	7	Accident	19	
Ret	12	(Japan) Haruchika Aoki	Arie Molenaar Racing	Honda	6	Retirement	15	
Ret	16	(Sweden) Johan Stigefelt	Sabre Sport	Sabre V4	5	Retirement	21	
Ret	1	(United States) Kenny Roberts Jr.	Telefónica Movistar Suzuki	Suzuki	3	Accident	9	
Ret	3	(Italy) Max Biaggi	Marlboro Yamaha Team	Yamaha	3	Accident	3	
Ret	80	(United States) Kurtis Roberts	Proton Team KR	Proton KR	2	Accident	17	
DNS	17	(Netherlands) Jurgen van den Goorbergh	Proton Team KR	Proton KR		Did not start		

== 250 cc classification ==
Pos.	No.	Rider	Manufacturer	Laps	Time/Retired	Grid	Points
1	74	(Japan) Daijiro Kato	Honda	20	43:22.487	1	25
2	31	(Japan) Tetsuya Harada	Aprilia	20	+14.893	6	20
3	10	(Spain) Fonsi Nieto	Aprilia	20	+15.892	2	16
4	15	(Italy) Roberto Locatelli	Aprilia	20	+19.748	7	13
5	99	(United Kingdom) Jeremy McWilliams	Aprilia	20	+35.867	9	11
6	21	(Italy) Franco Battaini	Aprilia	20	+46.364	13	10
7	8	(Japan) Naoki Matsudo	Yamaha	20	+46.408	12	9
8	66	(Germany) Alex Hofmann	Aprilia	20	+46.731	11	8
9	50	(France) Sylvain Guintoli	Aprilia	20	+56.513	14	7
10	44	(Italy) Roberto Rolfo	Aprilia	20	+58.914	4	6
11	5	(Italy) Marco Melandri	Aprilia	20	+1:00.301	8	5
12	81	(France) Randy de Puniet	Aprilia	20	+1:00.689	5	4
13	37	(Italy) Luca Boscoscuro	Aprilia	20	+1:09.730	15	3
14	6	(Spain) Alex Debón	Aprilia	20	+1:09.953	17	2
15	42	(Spain) David Checa	Honda	20	+1:10.810	18	1
16	16	(Spain) David Tomás	Honda	20	+1:10.847	23	
17	11	(Italy) Riccardo Chiarello	Aprilia	20	+1:12.008	16	
18	24	(United Kingdom) Jason Vincent	Yamaha	20	+1:26.290	22	
19	20	(Spain) Jerónimo Vidal	Aprilia	20	+1:30.098	24	
20	22	(Spain) José David de Gea	Yamaha	20	+1:37.261	21	
21	55	(Italy) Diego Giugovaz	Aprilia	20	+1:37.635	25	
22	36	(Spain) Luis Costa	Yamaha	20	+1:49.118	26	
23	27	(Australia) Shaun Geronimi	Yamaha	19	+1 lap	28	
Ret	57	(Italy) Lorenzo Lanzi	Aprilia	11	Retirement	19	
Ret	14	(Germany) Katja Poensgen	Honda	9	Accident	27	
Ret	7	(Spain) Emilio Alzamora	Honda	8	Accident	3	
Ret	9	(Argentina) Sebastián Porto	Yamaha	6	Retirement	20	
Ret	18	(Malaysia) Shahrol Yuzy	Yamaha	2	Accident	10	
DNS	23	(Brazil) César Barros	Yamaha		Did not start		
DNQ	45	(United Kingdom) Stuart Edwards	Yamaha		Did not qualify		

== 125 cc classification ==
Pos.	No.	Rider	Manufacturer	Laps	Time/Retired	Grid	Points
1	41	(Japan) Youichi Ui	Derbi	19	43:21.269	2	25
2	54	(San Marino) Manuel Poggiali	Gilera	19	+2.078	8	20
3	9	(Italy) Lucio Cecchinello	Aprilia	19	+2.196	3	16
4	26	(Spain) Daniel Pedrosa	Honda	19	+3.161	4	13
5	23	(Italy) Gino Borsoi	Aprilia	19	+3.987	5	11
6	24	(Spain) Toni Elías	Honda	19	+4.265	1	10
7	21	(France) Arnaud Vincent	Honda	19	+4.468	11	9
8	4	(Japan) Masao Azuma	Honda	19	+5.123	10	8
9	6	(Italy) Mirko Giansanti	Honda	19	+30.026	16	7
10	11	(Italy) Max Sabbatani	Aprilia	19	+30.292	7	6
11	5	(Japan) Noboru Ueda	TSR-Honda	19	+30.417	13	5
12	25	(Spain) Joan Olivé	Honda	19	+30.684	14	4
13	7	(Italy) Stefano Perugini	Italjet	19	+30.860	27	3
14	15	(San Marino) Alex de Angelis	Honda	19	+31.433	15	2
15	39	(Czech Republic) Jaroslav Huleš	Honda	19	+31.802	12	1
16	16	(Italy) Simone Sanna	Aprilia	19	+33.406	9	
17	31	(Spain) Ángel Rodríguez	Aprilia	19	+36.162	23	
18	12	(Spain) Raúl Jara	Aprilia	19	+36.542	26	
19	20	(Italy) Gaspare Caffiero	Aprilia	19	+37.248	22	
20	28	(Hungary) Gábor Talmácsi	Honda	19	+41.564	19	
21	10	(Germany) Jarno Müller	Honda	19	+41.660	20	
22	37	(San Marino) William de Angelis	Honda	19	+1:11.823	29	
23	77	(Spain) Adrián Araujo	Honda	19	+1:34.039	30	
Ret	29	(Spain) Ángel Nieto Jr.	Honda	17	Retirement	6	
Ret	34	(Andorra) Eric Bataille	Honda	7	Retirement	24	
Ret	8	(Italy) Gianluigi Scalvini	Italjet	7	Retirement	21	
Ret	17	(Germany) Steve Jenkner	Aprilia	0	Accident	28	
Ret	18	(Czech Republic) Jakub Smrž	Honda	0	Accident	17	
Ret	19	(Italy) Alessandro Brannetti	Aprilia	0	Accident	25	
Ret	22	(Spain) Pablo Nieto	Derbi	0	Accident	18	

== Championship standings after the race (500cc) ==
Below are the standings for the top five riders and constructors after round fifteen has concluded.

Riders' Championship standings

Pos.	Rider	Points
1	(Italy) Valentino Rossi	300
2	(Italy) Max Biaggi	203
3	(Italy) Loris Capirossi	199
4	(Brazil) Alex Barros	169
5	(Japan) Shinya Nakano	148

Constructors' Championship standings

Pos.	Constructor	Points
1	(Japan) Honda	342
2	(Japan) Yamaha	275
3	(Japan) Suzuki	149
4	(Malaysia) Proton KR	65
5	(United Kingdom) Sabre V4	6

- Note: Only the top five positions are included for both sets of standings.

Previous race: 2001 Australian Grand Prix	FIM Grand Prix World Championship; 2001 season	Next race: 2001 Rio de Janeiro Grand Prix
Previous race: 2000 Malaysian Grand Prix	Malaysian Grand Prix	Next race: 2002 Malaysian Grand Prix
