= 2001 German motorcycle Grand Prix =

Ninth round of the 2001 Grand Prix motorcycle racing season

(Germany) 2001 German Grand Prix
Race details
- Race 9 of 16 races in the 2001 Grand Prix motorcycle racing season
- Date: 22 July 2001
- Official name: Cinzano Motorrad Grand Prix Deutschland
- Location: Sachsenring
- Course: Permanent racing facility; 3.704 km (2.302 mi)

500cc
Pole position
- Rider: (Italy) Max Biaggi
- Time: 1:26.097
Fastest lap
- Rider: (Japan) Shinya Nakano
- Time: 1:26.808 on lap 30
Podium
- First: (Italy) Max Biaggi
- Second: (Spain) Carlos Checa
- Third: (Japan) Shinya Nakano

250cc
Pole position
- Rider: (Japan) Tetsuya Harada
- Time: 1:26.906
Fastest lap
- Rider: (Italy) Marco Melandri
- Time: 1:27.233 on lap 28
Podium
- First: (Italy) Marco Melandri
- Second: (Japan) Daijiro Kato
- Third: (Japan) Tetsuya Harada

125cc
Pole position
- Rider: (Italy) Max Sabbatani
- Time: 1:30.186
Fastest lap
- Rider: (Italy) Lucio Cecchinello
- Time: 1:30.371 on lap 4
Podium
- First: (Italy) Simone Sanna
- Second: (Spain) Toni Elías
- Third: (San Marino) Manuel Poggiali

The 2001 German motorcycle Grand Prix was the ninth round of the 2001 Grand Prix motorcycle racing season. It took place on the weekend of 20–22 July 2001 at the Sachsenring.

== 500 cc classification ==
Pos.	No.	Rider	Team	Manufacturer	Laps	Time/Retired	Grid	Points
1	3	(Italy) Max Biaggi	Marlboro Yamaha Team	Yamaha	30	43:36.983	1	25
2	7	(Spain) Carlos Checa	Marlboro Yamaha Team	Yamaha	30	+3.249	4	20
3	56	(Japan) Shinya Nakano	Gauloises Yamaha Tech 3	Yamaha	30	+3.642	2	16
4	6	(Japan) Norifumi Abe	Antena 3 Yamaha d'Antin	Yamaha	30	+4.784	8	13
5	4	(Brazil) Alex Barros	West Honda Pons	Honda	30	+21.164	3	11
6	19	(France) Olivier Jacque	Gauloises Yamaha Tech 3	Yamaha	30	+21.385	5	10
7	46	(Italy) Valentino Rossi	Nastro Azzurro Honda	Honda	30	+21.945	11	9
8	65	(Italy) Loris Capirossi	West Honda Pons	Honda	30	+22.485	7	8
9	1	(United States) Kenny Roberts Jr.	Telefónica Movistar Suzuki	Suzuki	30	+23.331	9	7
10	15	(Spain) Sete Gibernau	Telefónica Movistar Suzuki	Suzuki	30	+24.404	10	6
11	5	(Australia) Garry McCoy	Red Bull Yamaha WCM	Yamaha	30	+24.410	6	5
12	41	(Japan) Noriyuki Haga	Red Bull Yamaha WCM	Yamaha	30	+43.996	16	4
13	10	(Spain) José Luis Cardoso	Antena 3 Yamaha d'Antin	Yamaha	30	+44.216	12	3
14	17	(Netherlands) Jurgen van den Goorbergh	Proton Team KR	Proton KR	30	+44.329	13	2
15	14	(Australia) Anthony West	Dee Cee Jeans Racing Team	Honda	30	+1:22.533	15	1
16	24	(United Kingdom) Jason Vincent	Pulse GP	Pulse	29	+1 lap	21	
Ret	11	(Japan) Tohru Ukawa	Repsol YPF Honda Team	Honda	27	Accident	14	
Ret	18	(Australia) Brendan Clarke	Shell Advance Honda	Honda	18	Accident	20	
Ret	21	(Netherlands) Barry Veneman	Dee Cee Jeans Racing Team	Honda	13	Retirement	22	
Ret	16	(Sweden) Johan Stigefelt	Sabre Sport	Sabre V4	9	Retirement	19	
Ret	12	(Japan) Haruchika Aoki	Arie Molenaar Racing	Honda	0	Accident	17	
Ret	9	(United Kingdom) Leon Haslam	Shell Advance Honda	Honda	0	Accident	18	
DNS	28	(Spain) Àlex Crivillé	Repsol YPF Honda Team	Honda		Did not start		

== 250 cc classification ==
Pos.	No.	Rider	Manufacturer	Laps	Time/Retired	Grid	Points
1	5	(Italy) Marco Melandri	Aprilia	29	42:37.696	2	25
2	74	(Japan) Daijiro Kato	Honda	29	+0.052	3	20
3	31	(Japan) Tetsuya Harada	Aprilia	29	+0.203	1	16
4	44	(Italy) Roberto Rolfo	Aprilia	29	+18.310	7	13
5	81	(France) Randy de Puniet	Aprilia	29	+28.108	8	11
6	6	(Spain) Alex Debón	Aprilia	29	+36.566	10	10
7	66	(Germany) Alex Hofmann	Aprilia	29	+36.764	12	9
8	8	(Japan) Naoki Matsudo	Yamaha	29	+36.918	13	8
9	21	(Italy) Franco Battaini	Aprilia	29	+40.466	14	7
10	10	(Spain) Fonsi Nieto	Aprilia	29	+43.174	5	6
11	18	(Malaysia) Shahrol Yuzy	Yamaha	29	+43.256	17	5
12	57	(Italy) Lorenzo Lanzi	Aprilia	29	+57.398	20	4
13	20	(Spain) Jerónimo Vidal	Aprilia	29	+1:11.662	23	3
14	11	(Italy) Riccardo Chiarello	Aprilia	29	+1:25.507	24	2
15	16	(Spain) David Tomás	Honda	29	+1:25.614	22	1
16	75	(Germany) Dirk Heidolf	Yamaha	28	+1 lap	25	
17	76	(Germany) Christian Gemmel	Honda	28	+1 lap	28	
18	78	(Germany) Max Neukirchner	Honda	28	+1 lap	32	
19	36	(Spain) Luis Costa	Yamaha	28	+1 lap	30	
20	98	(Germany) Katja Poensgen	Aprilia	28	+1 lap	33	
Ret	12	(Germany) Klaus Nöhles	Aprilia	27	Accident	19	
Ret	50	(France) Sylvain Guintoli	Aprilia	27	Accident	21	
Ret	23	(Brazil) César Barros	Yamaha	13	Retirement	29	
Ret	45	(United Kingdom) Stuart Edwards	Honda	11	Accident	31	
Ret	55	(Italy) Diego Giugovaz	Yamaha	8	Accident	27	
Ret	99	(United Kingdom) Jeremy McWilliams	Aprilia	7	Accident	4	
Ret	7	(Spain) Emilio Alzamora	Honda	7	Accident	9	
Ret	77	(Germany) Marcel Schneider	Honda	6	Accident	34	
Ret	42	(Spain) David Checa	Honda	5	Accident	15	
Ret	9	(Argentina) Sebastián Porto	Yamaha	2	Accident	6	
Ret	22	(Spain) José David de Gea	Yamaha	2	Accident	16	
Ret	15	(Italy) Roberto Locatelli	Aprilia	1	Accident	11	
Ret	37	(Italy) Luca Boscoscuro	Aprilia	1	Accident	18	
DNS	25	(France) Vincent Philippe	Honda	0	Did not start	26	

== 125 cc classification ==
Pos.	No.	Rider	Manufacturer	Laps	Time/Retired	Grid	Points
1	16	(Italy) Simone Sanna	Aprilia	27	41:09.327	2	25
2	24	(Spain) Toni Elías	Honda	27	+0.247	5	20
3	54	(San Marino) Manuel Poggiali	Gilera	27	+0.701	4	16
4	4	(Japan) Masao Azuma	Honda	27	+0.734	11	13
5	9	(Italy) Lucio Cecchinello	Aprilia	27	+1.370	3	11
6	39	(Czech Republic) Jaroslav Huleš	Honda	27	+2.202	16	10
7	11	(Italy) Max Sabbatani	Aprilia	27	+2.326	1	9
8	31	(Spain) Ángel Rodríguez	Aprilia	27	+5.877	14	8
9	18	(Czech Republic) Jakub Smrž	Honda	27	+6.132	9	7
10	17	(Germany) Steve Jenkner	Aprilia	27	+10.071	6	6
11	26	(Spain) Daniel Pedrosa	Honda	27	+23.066	10	5
12	15	(San Marino) Alex de Angelis	Honda	27	+23.089	15	4
13	29	(Spain) Ángel Nieto Jr.	Honda	27	+23.309	13	3
14	6	(Italy) Mirko Giansanti	Honda	27	+27.801	18	2
15	25	(Spain) Joan Olivé	Honda	27	+28.065	23	1
16	7	(Italy) Stefano Perugini	Italjet	27	+28.139	21	
17	19	(Italy) Alessandro Brannetti	Aprilia	27	+28.948	22	
18	28	(Hungary) Gábor Talmácsi	Honda	27	+32.317	26	
19	41	(Japan) Youichi Ui	Derbi	27	+35.643	8	
20	34	(Andorra) Eric Bataille	Honda	27	+40.978	20	
21	27	(Italy) Marco Petrini	Honda	27	+44.624	17	
22	8	(Italy) Gianluigi Scalvini	Italjet	27	+1:06.673	19	
23	12	(Spain) Raúl Jara	Aprilia	27	+1:07.108	29	
24	79	(Germany) Andreas Hahn	Honda	27	+1:08.085	30	
25	78	(Germany) Claudius Klein	Honda	27	+1:08.383	28	
26	80	(Germany) Tobias Kirmeier	Honda	27	+1:08.632	27	
27	81	(Germany) René Knöfler	Yamaha	26	+1 lap	31	
Ret	77	(Spain) Adrián Araujo	Honda	15	Retirement	32	
Ret	22	(Spain) Pablo Nieto	Derbi	8	Retirement	12	
Ret	21	(France) Arnaud Vincent	Honda	8	Retirement	24	
Ret	23	(Italy) Gino Borsoi	Aprilia	6	Retirement	7	
Ret	82	(Finland) Mika Kallio	Honda	0	Retirement	25	
DNS	5	(Japan) Noboru Ueda	TSR-Honda		Did not start		
DNS	20	(Italy) Gaspare Caffiero	Aprilia		Did not start		
WD	10	(Germany) Jarno Müller	Honda		Withdrew		

== Championship standings after the race (500cc) ==
Below are the standings for the top five riders and constructors after round nine has concluded.

Riders' Championship standings

Pos.	Rider	Points
1	(Italy) Valentino Rossi	170
2	(Italy) Max Biaggi	160
3	(Italy) Loris Capirossi	111
4	(Brazil) Alex Barros	100
5	(Japan) Shinya Nakano	100

Constructors' Championship standings

Pos.	Constructor	Points
1	(Japan) Honda	197
2	(Japan) Yamaha	184
3	(Japan) Suzuki	83
4	(Malaysia) Proton KR	43
5	(New Zealand) Pulse	3

- Note: Only the top five positions are included for both sets of standings.

Previous race: 2001 British Grand Prix	FIM Grand Prix World Championship; 2001 season	Next race: 2001 Czech Republic Grand Prix
Previous race: 2000 German Grand Prix	German Grand Prix	Next race: 2002 German Grand Prix
