= 2001 Grand Prix motorcycle racing season =

Sports season

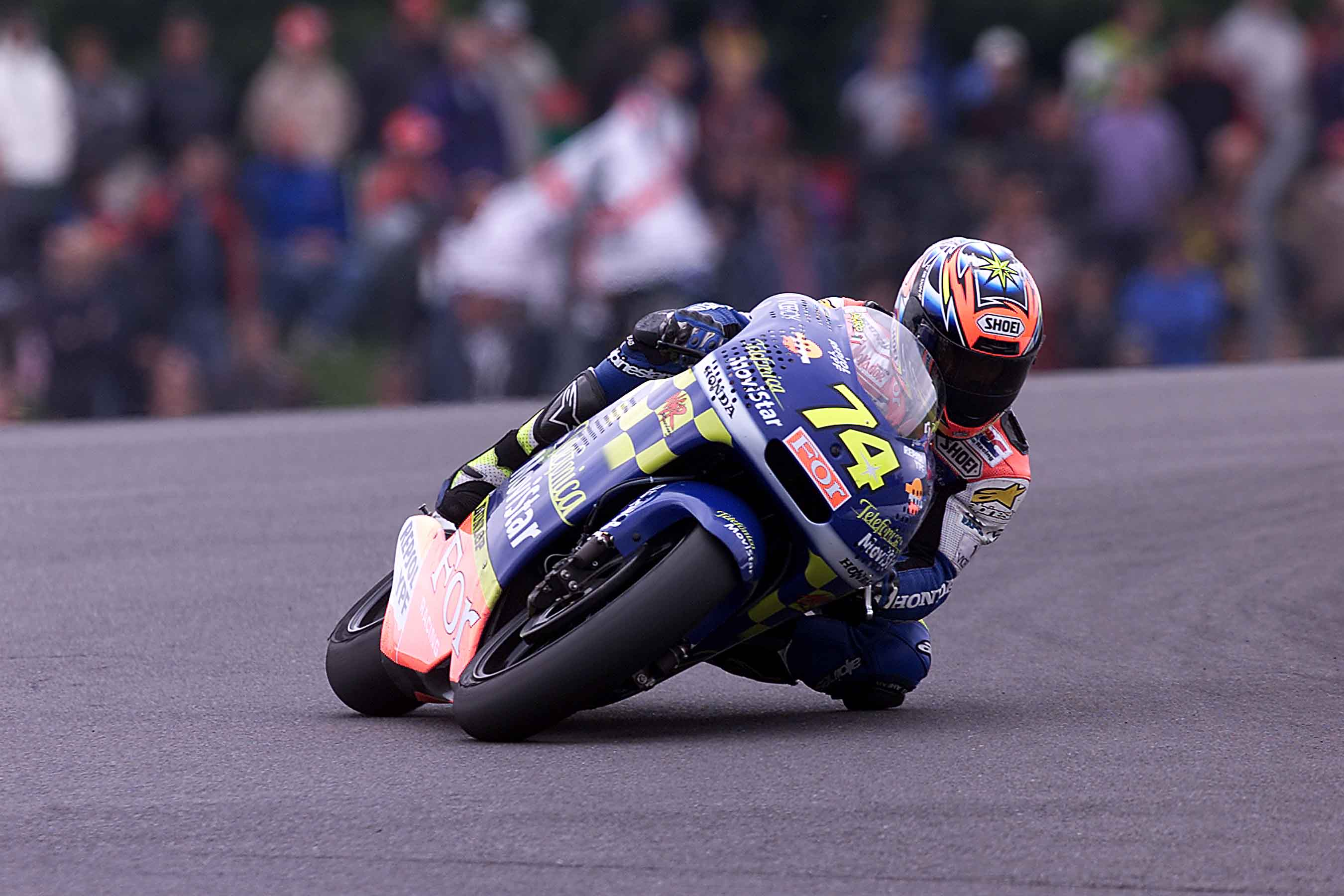
Daijiro Kato (pictured at Donington Park) became the 2001 250cc world champion

The 2001 Grand Prix motorcycle racing season was the 53rd F.I.M. Road Racing World Championship season.

== Season summary ==
2001 was the end of the 500 cc era in Grand Prix motorcycle racing; in 2002 the premier class would be renamed MotoGP and dominated by 4-stroke 990 cc machines. However, 2001 was the beginning of another era, that of Valentino Rossi's run of championships in the top class. His learning year past him, he won 11 races in 2001, far outdistancing his nearest competitor, Max Biaggi. Rossi and Biaggi began the season with a controversial incident at Suzuka, where Biaggi seemed to have tried to push Rossi into the dirt at 150 mph and Rossi responded two laps later with an aggressive pass and an extended middle finger. Rossi would win that race and sew-up the championship with two rounds to go. It was the last season where an independent team rider won the rider championship title in the premier class, until 2024, which was won by Jorge Martín, riding for Pramac Racing.

The 500 cc Rookie of the Year award went to Shinya Nakano. At the 2001 Japanese motorcycle Grand Prix, Katja Poensgen became the first female competitor to qualify for a 250cc Grand Prix race.

As of 2024, it was the last year where a single constructor (Honda) won the championship in all three categories.

== 2001 Grand Prix season calendar ==
In the weekend of 20 to 22 October 2000, the FIM confirmed the 2001 calendar. The following sixteen Grands Prix were scheduled to take place:

Round	Date	Grand Prix	Circuit
1	8 April	Grand Prix of Japan	Suzuka Circuit
2	22 April	(South Africa) Gauloises Africa's Grand Prix	Phakisa Freeway
3	6 May	(Spain) Gran Premio Marlboro de España	Circuito de Jerez
4	20 May	Grand Prix Polini de France	Bugatti Circuit
5	3 June	(Italy) Gran Premio Cinzano d'Italia	Mugello Circuit
6	17 June	(Catalonia) Gran Premi Marlboro de Catalunya	Circuit de Catalunya
7	30 June ††	(Netherlands) Gauloises Dutch TT	Assen
8	8 July	(United Kingdom) Cinzano British Grand Prix	Donington Park
9	22 July	(Germany) Cinzano Motorrad Grand Prix Deutschland	Sachsenring
10	26 August	(Czech Republic) Gauloises Grand Prix České republiky	Brno Circuit
11	9 September	Grande Premio Marlboro de Portugal	Autódromo do Estoril
12	23 September	(Valencian Community) Gran Premio Marlboro Comunitat Valenciana	Circuit Ricardo Tormo
13	7 October	(Tochigi Prefecture) Pacific Grand Prix of Motegi	Twin Ring Motegi
14	14 October	(Australia) Qantas Australian Grand Prix	Phillip Island Circuit
15	21 October	(Malaysia) Malaysian Motorcycle Grand Prix	Sepang International Circuit
16	3 November ††	(Rio de Janeiro (state)) Cinzano Rio Grand Prix	Autódromo Internacional Nelson Piquet

†† = Saturday race

=== Calendar changes ===
- The South African Grand Prix was moved back, from 19 March to 22 April.
- The Rio de Janeiro Grand Prix was moved back, from 7 October to 3 November.
- The Malaysian Grand Prix was moved back, from 2 April to 21 October.

== 2001 Grand Prix seasons results ==
Round	Date	Grand Prix	Circuit	125cc winner	250cc winner	500cc winner	Report
1	8 April	(Japan) Japanese motorcycle Grand Prix	Suzuka	(Japan) Masao Azuma	(Japan) Daijiro Kato	(Italy) Valentino Rossi	Report
2	22 April	(South Africa) South African motorcycle Grand Prix	Phakisa	(Japan) Youichi Ui	(Japan) Daijiro Kato	(Italy) Valentino Rossi	Report
3	6 May	(Spain) Spanish motorcycle Grand Prix	Jerez	(Japan) Masao Azuma	(Japan) Daijiro Kato	(Italy) Valentino Rossi	Report
4	20 May	(France) French motorcycle Grand Prix	Le Mans	(San Marino) Manuel Poggiali	(Japan) Daijiro Kato	(Italy) Max Biaggi	Report
5	3 June	(Italy) Italian motorcycle Grand Prix	Mugello	(Japan) Noboru Ueda	(Japan) Tetsuya Harada	(Brazil) Alex Barros	Report
6	17 June	(Catalonia) Catalan motorcycle Grand Prix	Catalunya	(Italy) Lucio Cecchinello	(Japan) Daijiro Kato	(Italy) Valentino Rossi	Report
7	30 June ††	(Netherlands) Dutch TT	Assen	(Spain) Toni Elías	(United Kingdom) Jeremy McWilliams	(Italy) Max Biaggi	Report
8	8 July	(United Kingdom) British motorcycle Grand Prix	Donington	(Japan) Youichi Ui	(Japan) Daijiro Kato	(Italy) Valentino Rossi	Report
9	22 July	(Germany) German motorcycle Grand Prix	Sachsenring	(Italy) Simone Sanna	(Italy) Marco Melandri	(Italy) Max Biaggi	Report
10	26 August	Czech Republic motorcycle Grand Prix	Brno	(Spain) Toni Elías	(Japan) Tetsuya Harada	(Italy) Valentino Rossi	Report
11	9 September	(Portugal) Portuguese motorcycle Grand Prix	Estoril	(San Marino) Manuel Poggiali	(Japan) Daijiro Kato	(Italy) Valentino Rossi	Report
12	23 September	Valencian Community motorcycle Grand Prix	Valencia	(San Marino) Manuel Poggiali	(Japan) Daijiro Kato	(Spain) Sete Gibernau	Report
13	7 October	(Tochigi Prefecture) Pacific motorcycle Grand Prix	Motegi	(Japan) Youichi Ui	(Japan) Tetsuya Harada	(Italy) Valentino Rossi	Report
14	14 October	(Australia) Australian motorcycle Grand Prix	Phillip Island	(Japan) Youichi Ui	(Japan) Daijiro Kato	(Italy) Valentino Rossi	Report
15	21 October	(Malaysia) Malaysian motorcycle Grand Prix	Sepang	(Japan) Youichi Ui	(Japan) Daijiro Kato	(Italy) Valentino Rossi	Report
16	3 November ††	(Rio de Janeiro (state)) Rio de Janeiro motorcycle Grand Prix	Rio de Janeiro	(Japan) Youichi Ui	(Japan) Daijiro Kato	(Italy) Valentino Rossi	Report

†† = Saturday race

== Participants ==
=== 500cc participants ===
Team	Constructor	Motorcycle	No.	Rider	Rounds
(Japan) Repsol YPF Honda Team	Honda	NSR500	11	(Japan) Tohru Ukawa	All
(Japan) Repsol YPF Honda Team	Honda	NSR500	28	(Spain) Àlex Crivillé	All
(Spain) West Honda Pons	Honda	NSR500	4	(Brazil) Alex Barros	All
(Spain) West Honda Pons	Honda	NSR500	65	(Italy) Loris Capirossi	All
(Japan) Nastro Azzurro Honda	Honda	NSR500	46	(Italy) Valentino Rossi	All
(Australia) Shell Advance Honda	Honda	NSR500	8	(United Kingdom) Chris Walker	1–8
(Australia) Shell Advance Honda	Honda	NSR500	9	(United Kingdom) Leon Haslam	9–16
(Australia) Shell Advance Honda	Honda	NSR500V	9	(United Kingdom) Leon Haslam	1–4, 6–8
(Australia) Shell Advance Honda	Honda	NSR500V	18	(Australia) Brendan Clarke	9–16
(Netherlands) Arie Molenaar Racing	Honda	NSR500V	12	(Japan) Haruchika Aoki	1–3, 5–16
(Netherlands) Arie Molenaar Racing	Honda	NSR500V	32	(Netherlands) Jarno Janssen	4
(Netherlands) Dee Cee Jeans Racing	Honda	NSR500V	14	(Australia) Marcus Payten	1
(Netherlands) Dee Cee Jeans Racing	Honda	NSR500V	14	(Australia) Anthony West	2–16
(Netherlands) Dee Cee Jeans Racing	Honda	NSR500V	21	(Netherlands) Barry Veneman	1–5, 7–16
(Spain) By Queroseno Racing	Honda	NSR500V	37	(Spain) Miguel Tey	12
(Italy) Paton Grand Prix; Slovnaft-Paton Grand Prix	Paton	PG500RC	25	(Australia) Shaun Geronimi	10
(Italy) Paton Grand Prix; Slovnaft-Paton Grand Prix	Paton	PG500RC	26	(Slovakia) Vladimír Častka	3, 5
(Italy) Paton Grand Prix; Slovnaft-Paton Grand Prix	Paton	PG500RC	27	(France) Sébastien Gimbert	8
(Malaysia) / (United States) Proton Team KR	Proton KR	KR3	17	(Netherlands) Jurgen van den Goorbergh	All
(Malaysia) / (United States) Proton Team KR	Proton KR	KR3	80	(United States) Kurtis Roberts	15
(Australia) Pulse GP	Pulse	500	24	(United Kingdom) Jason Vincent	1–7, 9
(Australia) Pulse GP	Pulse	500	68	(Australia) Mark Willis	1–8
(United Kingdom) Sabre Sport	Sabre	Sabre V4	16	(Sweden) Johan Stigefelt	1–15
(Japan) Telefónica Movistar Suzuki	Suzuki	RGV500 (XRB1)	1	(United States) Kenny Roberts Jr.	All
(Japan) Telefónica Movistar Suzuki	Suzuki	RGV500 (XRB1)	15	(Spain) Sete Gibernau	All
(Japan) Telefónica Movistar Suzuki	Suzuki	RGV500 (XRB1)	33	(Japan) Akira Ryō	1
(Japan) Telefónica Movistar Suzuki	Suzuki	RGV500 (XRB1)	64	(Japan) Yukio Kagayama	13
(Japan) Marlboro Yamaha Team	Yamaha	YZR500 (OWL6)	3	(Italy) Max Biaggi	All
(Japan) Marlboro Yamaha Team	Yamaha	YZR500 (OWL6)	7	(Spain) Carlos Checa	1, 3–16
(France) Gauloises Yamaha Tech 3	Yamaha	YZR500 (OWL6)	19	(France) Olivier Jacque	1–4, 6–16
(France) Gauloises Yamaha Tech 3	Yamaha	YZR500 (OWL6)	56	(Japan) Shinya Nakano	All
(United Kingdom) Red Bull Yamaha WCM	Yamaha	YZR500 (OWL6)	5	(Australia) Garry McCoy	1–4, 6–7, 9–16
(United Kingdom) Red Bull Yamaha WCM	Yamaha	YZR500 (OWL6)	24	(United Kingdom) Jason Vincent	8
(United Kingdom) Red Bull Yamaha WCM	Yamaha	YZR500 (OWL6)	41	(Japan) Noriyuki Haga	All
(Spain) Antena 3 Yamaha d'Antin	Yamaha	YZR500 (OWL6)	6	(Japan) Norifumi Abe	All
(Spain) Antena 3 Yamaha d'Antin	Yamaha	YZR500 (OWL6)	10	(Spain) José Luis Cardoso	All

Key
Regular Rider
Wildcard Rider
Replacement Rider

- All entries used Michelin tyres.

=== 250cc participants ===
Team	Constructor	Motorcycle	No.	Rider	Rounds
(Italy) MS Aprilia Racing	Aprilia	Aprilia RSV 250	5	(Italy) Marco Melandri	All
(Italy) MS Aprilia Racing	Aprilia	Aprilia RSV 250	31	(Japan) Tetsuya Harada	All
(Italy) MS Aprilia Racing	Aprilia	Aprilia RSV 250	34	(Italy) Marcellino Lucchi	3, 5
(Spain) Valência Circuit - Aspar Team	Aprilia	Aprilia RSV 250	6	(Spain) Álex Debón	All
(Spain) Valência Circuit - Aspar Team	Aprilia	Aprilia RSV 250	10	(Spain) Fonsi Nieto	All
(Italy) Telefónica MoviStar Honda	Honda	Honda NSR250	7	(Spain) Emilio Alzamora	All
(Italy) Telefónica MoviStar Honda	Honda	Honda NSR250	74	(Japan) Daijiro Kato	All
(Malaysia) Petronas Sprinta Yamaha TVK	Yamaha	Yamaha YZR 250	8	(Japan) Naoki Matsudo	All
(Malaysia) Petronas Sprinta Yamaha TVK	Yamaha	Yamaha YZR 250	18	(Malaysia) Shahrol Yuzy	All
(Germany) Yamaha Kurz (rd 1-9); Dark Dog Yamaha Kurz (rd 10-16)	Yamaha	Yamaha YZR 250	9	(Argentina) Sebastián Porto	All
(Germany) Yamaha Kurz (rd 1-9); Dark Dog Yamaha Kurz (rd 10-16)	Yamaha	Yamaha YZR 250	23	(Brazil) Cesar Barros	All
(Italy) Aprilia Grand Prix	Aprilia	Aprilia RSV 250	11	(Italy) Riccardo Chiarello	1–2, 4–16
(Italy) Aprilia Grand Prix	Aprilia	Aprilia RSV 250	99	(United Kingdom) Jeremy McWilliams	1–5
/ (Austria) MS Aprilia Racing (Germany)	Aprilia	Aprilia RSV 250	12	(Germany) Klaus Nöhles	1–12
/ (Austria) MS Aprilia Racing (Germany)	Aprilia	Aprilia RSV 250	55	(Italy) Diego Giugovaz	13–16
/ (Austria) MS Aprilia Racing (Germany)	Aprilia	Aprilia RSV 250	99	(United Kingdom) Jeremy McWilliams	6–16
(Spain) By Queroseno Racing Team	Honda	Honda NSR250	16	(Spain) David Tomás	1, 3–16
(Spain) By Queroseno Racing Team	Honda	Honda NSR250	26	(Spain) Iván Silva	2
(Spain) By Queroseno Racing Team	Honda	Honda NSR250	85	(Brazil) Rafael Da Cunha	16
(Australia) Shell Advance Honda	Honda	Honda NSR250	14	(Germany) Katja Poensgen	11–16
(Italy) MS Eros Ramazzotti Racing	Aprilia	Aprilia RSV 250	15	(Italy) Roberto Locatelli	All
(Italy) MS Eros Ramazzotti Racing	Aprilia	Aprilia RSV 250	21	(Italy) Franco Battaini	All
(Spain) Antena 3 Yamaha d'Antin	Yamaha	Yamaha YZR 250	19	(France) Julien Allemand	1–4
(Spain) Antena 3 Yamaha d'Antin	Yamaha	Yamaha YZR 250	22	(Spain) José David de Gea	All
(Spain) Antena 3 Yamaha d'Antin	Yamaha	Yamaha YZR 250	36	(Spain) Luis Costa	5–16
(Spain) PR2 Metrored / PR2 - Damas	Aprilia	Aprilia RSV 250	20	(Spain) Jerónimo Vidal	1–15
(Spain) PR2 Metrored / PR2 - Damas	Honda	Honda NSR250	41	(Spain) Damaso Nacher	3, 11–12, 16
(United Kingdom) QUB Team Optimum	Yamaha	Yamaha YZR 250	24	(United Kingdom) Jason Vincent	10–16
(France) Tecmas Racing	Honda	Honda NSR250	25	(France) Vincent Philippe	9
(Germany) Edo Racing	Yamaha	Yamaha YZR 250	55	(Italy) Diego Giugovaz	1–5, 7–9
(Germany) Edo Racing	Yamaha	Yamaha YZR 250	27	(Australia) Shaun Geronimi	15–16
(Germany) Edo Racing	Yamaha	Yamaha YZR 250	46	(Japan) Taro Sekiguchi	6, 10–14
(Germany) Edo Racing	Yamaha	Yamaha YZR 250	80	(Slovakia) Vladimir Častka	10
(Italy) Campetella Racing	Aprilia	Aprilia RSV 250	37	(Italy) Luca Boscoscuro	All
(Italy) Campetella Racing	Aprilia	Aprilia RSV 250	57	(Italy) Lorenzo Lanzi	All
(Germany) Kolmer Racing Team	Yamaha	Yamaha YZR 250	38	(Spain) Álvaro Molina	3, 6, 12
(Spain) BRT Ismael Bonilla	Honda	Honda NSR250	39	(Spain) Ismael Bonilla	3
(Italy) Team Fomma	Honda	Honda NSR250	42	(Spain) David Checa	All
(Spain) Construcciones CM	Honda	Honda NSR250	43	(Spain) Isaac Martín	12
(Italy) Safilo Oxydo Race	Aprilia	Aprilia RSV 250	44	(Italy) Roberto Rolfo	All
(Japan) FCC-TSR	Honda	Honda NSR250	45	(United Kingdom) Stuart Edwards	2–11
(Japan) FCC-TSR	TSR-Honda	Honda NSR250	45	(United Kingdom) Stuart Edwards	1
(Japan) FCC-TSR	TSR-Honda	Honda NSR250	47	(Japan) Tekkyu Kayo	1
(United Kingdom) Fujitsu Siemens	Yamaha	Yamaha YZR 250	45	(United Kingdom) Stuart Edwards	12–16
(Japan) Club Ventis	Yamaha	Yamaha YZR 250	46	(Japan) Taro Sekiguchi	1
(Japan) Team Kotake RSC	Honda	Honda NSR250	48	(Japan) Shinichi Nakatomi	1
(Japan) Hitman RC Koshien Yamaha	Yamaha	Yamaha YZR 250	49	(Japan) Choujun Kameya	1
Équipe de France - Scrab GP	Aprilia	Aprilia RSV 250	50	(France) Sylvain Guintoli	All
Équipe de France - Scrab GP	Aprilia	Aprilia RSV 250	81	(France) Randy de Puniet	All
(Spain) Privest Yamaha d'Antin	Yamaha	Yamaha YZR 250	51	(South Africa) Jonathan Van Vuuren	2
Équipe de France	Honda	Honda NSR250	52	(France) Guillaume Dietrich	4
Équipe de France	Honda	Honda NSR250	64	(France) Hugo Marchand	4
(France) Ouvrard Racing Team	Yamaha	Yamaha YZR 250	53	(France) Tom Ouvrard	4
(France) Bentin Motorsport	Honda	Honda NSR250	54	(France) Hervé Mora	4
(France) Fouloi Racing Team	Yamaha	Yamaha YZR 250	56	(France) David Fouloi	4
(United Kingdom) Right Track Racing	Honda	Honda NSR250	58	(South Africa) Shane Norval	8
(United Kingdom) Team Jackson	Honda	Honda NSR250	59	(United Kingdom) Gary Jackson	8
(Netherlands) Car Centre Nijmegen	Honda	Honda NSR250	60	(Netherlands) Gert Pieper	7
(Netherlands) Performance Racing	Yamaha	Yamaha YZR 250	61	(Netherlands) Jarno Boesveld	7
(United States) Cruise America Grand Prix Racing	Honda	Honda NSR250	62	(United States) Jason Di Salvo	7–8, 10
(Netherlands) M.R.T.T. Hugen Racing	Honda	Honda NSR250	63	(Netherlands) Arnold Litjens	7
(Germany) Dark Dog Racing Factory (rd 1-9); Racing Factory (rd 10-16)	Aprilia	Aprilia RSV 250	66	(Germany) Alex Hofmann	All
(Germany) Dark Dog Racing Factory (rd 1-9); Racing Factory (rd 10-16)	Aprilia	Aprilia RSV 250	98	(Germany) Katja Poensgen	1–9
(United Kingdom) EPS Racing	Yamaha	Yamaha YZR 250	67	(United Kingdom) Michael Herzberg	8
(United Kingdom) Monster Mob	Honda	Honda NSR250	68	(United Kingdom) Stuart Easton	8
(Portugal) TZM Sport	Honda	Honda NSR250	70	(Portugal) José Estrela	11
(Spain) Team Motorsport Racing	Honda	Honda NSR250	71	(Spain) Javier Díaz	11
(Spain) PS Racing	Aprilia	Aprilia RSV 250	72	(Spain) Michael García	11–12
(Germany) Freundenberg Racing Team	Yamaha	Yamaha YZR 250	75	(Germany) Dirk Heidolf	9
(Germany) Kiefer Castrol Honda Racing	Honda	Honda NSR250	76	(Germany) Christian Gemmel	9
(Germany) Kiefer Castrol Honda Racing	Honda	Honda NSR250	77	(Germany) Marcel Schneider	9
(Germany) ADAC Sachsen	Honda	Honda NSR250	78	(Germany) Max Neukirchner	9
(Germany) MSC Schleizer Dreieck	Honda	Honda NSR250	79	(Germany) Norman Rank	10
(Germany) Road Racing Team Voit	Honda	Honda NSR250	82	(Germany) Henrik Voit	10
(Hungary) Biro Racing Team	Honda	Honda NSR250	83	(Hungary) Gábor Rizmayer	10, 12
(Spain) Vaz Yamaha d'Antin	Yamaha	Yamaha YZR 250	84	(Brazil) Cristiano Vieira	16
(Japan) Team Harc-Pro	Honda	Honda NSR250	87	(Japan) Hiroshi Aoyama	1
(Japan) Team Harc-Pro	Honda	Honda NSR250	92	(Japan) Hiroshi Aoyama	13
(Japan) SP Tadao Racing Team	Yamaha	Yamaha YZR 250	88	(Japan) Nobuyuki Ohsaki	13
(Japan) Motorex Daytona	Yamaha	Yamaha YZR 250	89	(Japan) Osamu Miyazaki	13
(Japan) RT Endurance	Honda	Honda NSR250	90	(Japan) Daisaku Sakai	13
(Japan) Morino Kumasan Miztec. RT	Yamaha	Yamaha YZR 250	91	(Japan) Takayuki Onodera	13
(Australia) Impact Racing	Yamaha	Yamaha YZR 250	93	(Australia) Earl Lynch	14
(Australia) RGV Spares	Yamaha	Yamaha YZR 250	94	(Australia) Terry Carter	14
(Australia) RGV Spares	Yamaha	Yamaha YZR 250	97	(Australia) Josh Brookes	14
(Australia) Allect Racing	Honda	Honda NSR250	95	(Australia) Shane Smith	14
(Australia) Turramurra Cyclery Racing	Yamaha	Yamaha YZR 250	96	(Australia) Mark Rowling	14

Key
Regular Rider
Wildcard Rider
Replacement Rider

=== 125cc participants ===
Team	Constructor	Motorcycle	No.	Rider	Rounds
Liégeois Compétition	Honda	Honda RS125R	4	(Japan) Masao Azuma	All
Liégeois Compétition	Honda	Honda RS125R	14	(Germany) Philipp Hafeneger	1–5
Liégeois Compétition	Honda	Honda RS125R	77	(Spain) Adrián Araujo	6–16
F.C.C. - TSR	Honda	Honda RS125R	5	(Japan) Noboru Ueda	All
Axo Racing Team	Honda	Honda RS125R	6	(Italy) Mirko Giansanti	All
Axo Racing Team	Honda	Honda RS125R	34	(Andorra) Eric Bataille	All
Italjet Racing Team	Italjet	Italjet F125	7	(Italy) Stefano Perugini	All
Italjet Racing Team	Italjet	Italjet F125	8	(Italy) Gianluigi Scalvini	All
MS Aprilia LCR	Aprilia	Aprilia RS125R	9	(Italy) Lucio Cecchinello	All
MS Aprilia LCR	Aprilia	Aprilia RS125R	12	(Spain) Raúl Jara	All
PEV-Spalt-Moto ADAC Sachsen	Honda	Honda RS125R	10	(Germany) Jarno Müller	1–9, 13–16
PEV-Spalt-Moto ADAC Sachsen	Honda	Honda RS125R	30	(Germany) Jascha Büch	10–12
Bossini Fontana Racing	Aprilia	Aprilia RS125R	11	(Italy) Max Sabbatani	All
Bossini Fontana Racing	Aprilia	Aprilia RS125R	20	(Italy) Gaspare Caffiero	1–15
Bossini Fontana Racing	Aprilia	Aprilia RS125R	50	(Italy) Andrea Ballerini	5, 16
Matteoni Racing	Honda	Honda RS125R	15	(San Marino) Alex de Angelis	All
Matteoni Racing	Honda	Honda RS125R	39	(Czech Republic) Jaroslav Huleš	All
Safilo Oxydo Race	Aprilia	Aprilia RS125R	16	(Italy) Simone Sanna	All
Team LAE - UGT 3000	Aprilia	Aprilia RS125R	17	(Germany) Steve Jenkner	All
Team LAE - UGT 3000	Aprilia	Aprilia RS125R	23	(Italy) Gino Borsoi	All
Budweiser Budvar Hanusch	Honda	Honda RS125R	18	(Czech Republic) Jakub Smrž	All
Team Crae	Aprilia	Aprilia RS125R	19	(Italy) Alessandro Brannetti	1–3, 5–16
Team Fomma	Honda	Honda RS125R	21	(France) Arnaud Vincent	All
Viceroy Team	Honda	Honda RS125R	29	(Spain) Ángel Nieto, Jr.	All
L&M Derbi Team	Derbi	Derbi 125 GP	22	(Spain) Pablo Nieto	All
L&M Derbi Team	Derbi	Derbi 125 GP	41	(Japan) Youichi Ui	All
Telefónica MoviStar Jnr. Team	Honda	Honda RS125R	24	(Spain) Toni Elías	All
Telefónica MoviStar Jnr. Team	Honda	Honda RS125R	25	(Spain) Joan Olivé	All
Telefónica MoviStar Jnr. Team	Honda	Honda RS125R	26	(Spain) Daniel Pedrosa	All
Telefónica MoviStar Jnr. Team	Honda	Honda RS125R	73	(Australia) Casey Stoner	8, 14
Racing Service	Honda	Honda RS125R	27	(Italy) Marco Petrini	1–11
Racing Service	Honda	Honda RS125R	28	(Hungary) Gábor Talmácsi	All
Racing Service	Honda	Honda RS125R	37	(San Marino) William de Angelis	12–16
Valência Circuit - Aspar Team	Aprilia	Aprilia RS125R	31	(Spain) Ángel Rodríguez	All
Valência Circuit - Aspar Team	Aprilia	Aprilia RS125R	44	(Spain) Héctor Faubel	3, 12
By Queroseno Racing Team	Honda	Honda RS125R	43	(Spain) Daniel Piñera	3, 6
By Queroseno Racing Team	Honda	Honda RS125R	90	(Spain) José Luis Nión	11
CC Valencia Aspar	Aprilia	Aprilia RS125R	45	(Spain) Javier Forés	12
Racing Team Panades	Honda	Honda RS125R	48	(Brazil) Leandro Panadés	16
RCGM Rubicone Corse	Aprilia	Aprilia RS125R	51	(Italy) Andrea Dovizioso	5
BNT Racing	Honda	Honda RS125R	52	(Italy) Michele Conti	5
Gilera Racing Team	Gilera	Gilera 125 GP	54	(San Marino) Manuel Poggiali	All
JHA Racing	Honda	Honda RS125R	55	(Japan) Hideyuki Nakajoh	1, 13
JHA Racing	Honda	Honda RS125R	97	(Japan) Naoki Katoh	1
Team Plus One	ERP Honda	Honda RS125R	56	(Japan) Yuzo Fujioka	1, 13
Wanpaku - Team Wheelie	Honda	Honda RS125R	57	(Japan) Hiroyuki Kikuchi	1
Emtec Racing	Aprilia	Aprilia RS125R	58	(South Africa) Jason Wessels	2
Tati Team Beaujolais Racing	Honda	Honda RS125R	59	(France) Julien Enjolras	4
MOB 77	Honda	Honda RS125R	60	(France) Xavier Hérouin	4
Provence Moto Sport	Aprilia	Aprilia RS125R	61	(France) Grégory Lefort	4
AJP Team	Yamaha	Yamaha TZ125	62	(France) Erwan Nigon	4
Racing Moto Sport	Honda	Honda RS125R	63	(France) Jimmy Petit	4
OSL SC & Okegawa School	E-NER	E-NER 125	64	(Japan) Yuki Takahashi	13
Kumamoto Racing	Honda	Honda RS125R	65	(Japan) Toshihisa Kuzuhara	13
Showa Denki Team Harc-Pro	Honda	Honda RS125R	66	(Japan) Shuhei Aoyama	13
Adm.Kant.Harkens/Vts Sneltr.	Honda	Honda RS125R	67	(Netherlands) Adri den Bekker	7
Luvro/Tennen V. Leeuwen Tech	Honda	Honda RS125R	68	(Netherlands) Wilhelm van Leeuwen	7
Spijkse Metaalhandel Racing	Yamaha	Yamaha TZ125	69	(Netherlands) Ronnie Timmer	7
D.S.A.	Honda	Honda RS125R	70	(Netherlands) Patrick Lakerveld	7
Paul Robinson Racing	Honda	Honda RS125R	71	(United Kingdom) Paul Robinson	8
Wilson Racing TSR	Honda	Honda RS125R	72	(United Kingdom) Chris Martin	8
Breadline Racing / TSR	Honda	Honda RS125R	74	(United Kingdom) Sam Owens	
Engines Engineering	Rieju	Rieju 125GP	75	(Italy) Fabrizio Lai	12
ADAC Junior Team Germany	Honda	Honda RS125R	78	(Germany) Claudius Klein	9
Team Hahn	Honda	Honda RS125R	79	(Germany) Andreas Hahn	9
Ivetra-Seel Racing	Honda	Honda RS125R	80	(Germany) Tobias Kirmeier	9–10
HKS Racing Team Moto Meinig	Yamaha	Yamaha TZ125	81	(Germany) René Knöfler	9
Team Red Devil Honda	Honda	Honda RS125R	82	(Finland) Mika Kallio	9, 12
BRC Racing Team	Honda	Honda RS125R	83	(Czech Republic) Václav Bittman	10
ELF Revena Team	Honda	Honda RS125R	84	(Czech Republic) Igor Kaláb	10
Klub R.J.T.	Honda	Honda RS125R	85	(Czech Republic) Tomáš Mikšovský	10
AFL Racing Team	Honda	Honda RS125R	86	(Portugal) José Leite	11
TZM Sport	Honda	Honda RS125R	87	(Portugal) José Monteiro	11
I.R.T.	Honda	Honda RS125R	88	(Portugal) João Pinto	11
Team VP Moto	Aprilia	Aprilia RS125R	89	(Portugal) Ricardo Tomé	11
Taylor Racing	Honda	Honda RS125R	91	(Australia) Jay Taylor	14
Tech.M/C Clothing - JBD Racing	Honda	Honda RS125R	92	(Australia) Peter Galvin	14
Tech.M/C Clothing - JBD Racing	Honda	Honda RS125R	93	(Australia) Andrew Brooks	14
Team eServ	Honda	Honda RS125R	94	(Australia) Cath Thompson	14
Sonax Racing Aprilia	Aprilia	Aprilia RS125R	96	(Czech Republic) Matěj Smrž	10
Team Harc-Pro	Honda	Honda RS125R	98	(Japan) Masafumi Ono	1

Key
Regular Rider
Wildcard Rider
Replacement Rider

== Standings ==
=== 500cc riders' standings ===
Scoring system

Points were awarded to the top fifteen finishers. A rider had to finish the race to earn points.

Position	**1st**	**2nd**	**3rd**	**4th**	**5th**	**6th**	**7th**	**8th**	**9th**	**10th**	**11th**	**12th**	**13th**	**14th**	**15th**
Points	25	20	16	13	11	10	9	8	7	6	5	4	3	2	1

Pos	Rider	Bike	JPN (Japan)	RSA (South Africa)	ESP (Spain)	FRA (France)	ITA (Italy)	CAT (Catalonia)	NED (Netherlands)	GBR (United Kingdom)	GER (Germany)	CZE (Czech Republic)	POR (Portugal)	VAL (Valencian Community)	PAC (Tochigi Prefecture)	AUS (Australia)	MAL (Malaysia)	RIO (Rio de Janeiro (state))	Pts
1	(Italy) Valentino Rossi	Honda	1	**1**	**1**	3	**Ret**	**1**	2	1	7	1	1	11	1	1	1	1	325
2	(Italy) Max Biaggi	Yamaha	3	8	11	**1**	3	2	1	**2**	**1**	**10**	**5**	**10**	Ret	**2**	Ret	3	219
3	(Italy) Loris Capirossi	Honda	**8**	2	8	7	2	3	**3**	10	8	3	2	Ret	**3**	3	**2**	5	210
4	(Brazil) Alex Barros	Honda	6	9	6	8	1	Ret	4	3	5	9	Ret	2	2	4	7	4	182
5	(Japan) Shinya Nakano	Yamaha	5	4	4	11	8	4	5	6	3	DNS	9	7	6	7	4	9	155
6	(Spain) Carlos Checa	Yamaha	10		14	2	Ret	8	Ret	5	2	7	4	4	7	16	10	2	137
7	(Japan) Norifumi Abe	Yamaha	4	5	2	4	9	6	Ret	Ret	4	4	Ret	8	4	13	13	6	137
8	(Spain) Àlex Crivillé	Honda	9	6	3	5	4	11	Ret	7	DNS	2	Ret	Ret	11	11	6	7	120
9	(Spain) Sete Gibernau	Suzuki	Ret	10	10	9	6	5	7	11	10	8	Ret	1	9	9	8	12	119
10	(Japan) Tohru Ukawa	Honda	Ret	3	5	Ret	7	7	8	16	Ret	5	Ret	6	5	5	5	**Ret**	107
11	(United States) Kenny Roberts Jr.	Suzuki	7	7	7	6	Ret	Ret	6	8	9	Ret	6	3	8	15	Ret	16	97
12	(Australia) Garry McCoy	Yamaha	2	Ret	9	DNS		DNS	DNS		11	6	3	12	12	Ret	3	10	88
13	(Netherlands) Jurgen van den Goorbergh	Proton KR	11	11	13	10	12	9	9	12	14	Ret	7	9	Ret	10	DNS	Ret	65
14	(Japan) Noriyuki Haga	Yamaha	Ret	Ret	12	Ret	10	10	10	4	12	11	Ret	Ret	Ret	8	9	DNS	59
15	(France) Olivier Jacque	Yamaha	Ret	16	DNS	WD		12	11	9	6	12	8	5	Ret	6	Ret	Ret	59
16	(Spain) José Luis Cardoso	Yamaha	Ret	13	Ret	13	11	14	12	Ret	13	13	10	17	13	Ret	11	8	45
17	(Japan) Haruchika Aoki	Honda	12	12	DNS		5	15	14	Ret	Ret	14	11	Ret	Ret	14	Ret	14	33
18	(Australia) Anthony West	Honda		14	15	DNS	Ret	Ret	15	14	15	Ret	12	13	14	12	12	13	27
19	(United Kingdom) Leon Haslam	Honda	13	17	16	DNS		WD	13	17	Ret	Ret	Ret	16	15	19	15	11	13
20	(United Kingdom) Chris Walker	Honda	Ret	15	Ret	12	Ret	13	DNS	15									9
21	(Japan) Yukio Kagayama	Suzuki													10				6
22	(Sweden) Johan Stigefelt	Sabre V4	Ret	18	17	Ret	Ret	17	18	18	Ret	15	13	14	Ret	17	Ret		6
23	(Australia) Brendan Clarke	Honda									Ret	Ret	14	Ret	17	20	14	15	5
24	(Netherlands) Barry Veneman	Honda	Ret	19	Ret	14	DSQ		17	Ret	Ret	16	15	15	16	18	Ret	17	4
25	(Australia) Mark Willis	Pulse	Ret	20	19	Ret	13	18	16	19									3
26	(United Kingdom) Jason Vincent	Pulse	Ret	DNS	18	Ret	Ret	16	Ret		16								3
26	(United Kingdom) Jason Vincent	Yamaha								13									3
27	(Netherlands) Jarno Janssen	Honda				15													1
	(Japan) Akira Ryō	Suzuki	Ret																0
	(Australia) Shaun Geronimi	Paton										Ret							0
	(United States) Kurtis Roberts	Proton KR															Ret		0
	(Slovakia) Vladimír Častka	Paton			DNQ		DNQ												0
	(Australia) Marcus Payten	Honda	DNQ																0
	(Spain) Miguel Tey	Honda												DNQ					0
	(France) Sébastien Gimbert	Paton								WD									0
Pos	Rider	Bike	JPN (Japan)	RSA (South Africa)	ESP (Spain)	FRA (France)	ITA (Italy)	CAT (Catalonia)	NED (Netherlands)	GBR (United Kingdom)	GER (Germany)	CZE (Czech Republic)	POR (Portugal)	VAL (Valencian Community)	PAC (Tochigi Prefecture)	AUS (Australia)	MAL (Malaysia)	RIO (Rio de Janeiro (state))	Pts

Colour	Result
Gold	Winner
Silver	Second place
Bronze	Third place
Green	Points classification
Blue	Non-points classification
Blue	Non-classified finish (NC)
Purple	Retired, not classified (Ret)
Red	Did not qualify (DNQ)
Red	Did not pre-qualify (DNPQ)
Black	Disqualified (DSQ)
White	Did not start (DNS)
White	Withdrew (WD)
White	Race cancelled (C)
Blank	Did not practice (DNP)
Blank	Did not arrive (DNA)
Blank	Excluded (EX)

**Bold** – Pole position
Italics – Fastest lap

=== 250cc riders' standings ===
Scoring system

Points were awarded to the top fifteen finishers. A rider had to finish the race to earn points.

Position	**1st**	**2nd**	**3rd**	**4th**	**5th**	**6th**	**7th**	**8th**	**9th**	**10th**	**11th**	**12th**	**13th**	**14th**	**15th**
Points	25	20	16	13	11	10	9	8	7	6	5	4	3	2	1

Pos	Rider	Bike	JPN (Japan)	RSA (South Africa)	ESP (Spain)	FRA (France)	ITA (Italy)	CAT (Catalonia)	NED (Netherlands)	GBR (United Kingdom)	GER (Germany)	CZE (Czech Republic)	POR (Portugal)	VAL (Valencian Community)	PAC (Tochigi Prefecture)	AUS (Australia)	MAL (Malaysia)	RIO (Rio de Janeiro (state))	Pts
1	(Japan) Daijiro Kato	Honda	**1**	**1**	**1**	**1**	10	**1**	11	1	2	3	1	1	Ret	1	**1**	1	322
2	(Japan) Tetsuya Harada	Aprilia	2	3	2	2	**1**	2	**24**	**18**	**3**	**1**	**3**	2	**1**	**2**	2	6	273
3	(Italy) Marco Melandri	Aprilia	6	2	3	3	3	Ret	6	3	1	2	2	Ret	Ret	DNS	11	2	194
4	(Italy) Roberto Rolfo	Aprilia	5	8	7	9	2	3	Ret	2	4	5	4	8	5	3	10	8	177
5	(Spain) Fonsi Nieto	Aprilia	11	5	5	5	5	5	DNS	6	10	4	7	**3**	4	5	3	**4**	167
6	(United Kingdom) Jeremy McWilliams	Aprilia	8	6	10	7	Ret	6	1	Ret	Ret	Ret	5	5	3	4	5	5	141
7	(Spain) Emilio Alzamora	Honda	Ret	19	6	4	6	7	2	4	Ret	7	Ret	4	2	6	Ret	7	136
8	(Italy) Roberto Locatelli	Aprilia	3	4	8	6	4	4	17	DNS	Ret	12	Ret	7	6	7	4	3	134
9	(Japan) Naoki Matsudo	Yamaha	4	9	12	Ret	12	10	19	5	8	9	6	6	7	9	7	9	112
10	(Italy) Franco Battaini	Aprilia	7	20	9	13	Ret	20	5	13	9	14	9	14	8	Ret	6	10	75
11	(Spain) Álex Debón	Aprilia	Ret	15	13	10	8	11	20	8	6	10	12	9	18	Ret	14	16	60
12	(Germany) Alex Hofmann	Aprilia	12	10	11	11	18	9	12	9	7	DNS	Ret	Ret	17	Ret	8	17	55
13	(France) Randy de Puniet	Aprilia	Ret	Ret	18	Ret	Ret	8	13	Ret	5	6	17	10	11	Ret	12	13	50
14	(France) Sylvain Guintoli	Aprilia	15	12	Ret	14	Ret	18	4	7	Ret	13	Ret	16	16	Ret	9	11	44
15	(Malaysia) Shahrol Yuzy	Yamaha	Ret	11	Ret	15	9	12	26	10	11	Ret	10	12	19	10	Ret	23	44
16	(Argentina) Sebastián Porto	Yamaha	9	7	Ret	8	Ret	14	14	Ret	Ret	8	Ret	13	Ret	Ret	Ret	Ret	39
17	(Spain) David Checa	Honda	16	13	16	16	7	16	Ret	11	Ret	18	8	11	12	Ret	15	22	35
18	(Germany) Klaus Nöhles	Aprilia	14	14	14	12	16	15	18	12	Ret	11	11	DNQ					25
19	(Spain) José David de Gea	Yamaha	Ret	Ret	Ret	18	13	21	3	17	Ret	19	13	15	Ret	Ret	20	15	24
20	(Italy) Lorenzo Lanzi	Aprilia	17	17	15	Ret	11	19	16	14	12	15	Ret	Ret	15	11	Ret	12	23
21	(Italy) Luca Boscoscuro	Aprilia	Ret	Ret	Ret	17	Ret	17	7	15	Ret	17	18	Ret	Ret	8	13	18	21
22	(Japan) Taro Sekiguchi	Yamaha	10					13				16	Ret	17	9	12			20
23	(Italy) Riccardo Chiarello	Aprilia	Ret	Ret		20	Ret	23	8	Ret	14	20	Ret	19	23	13	17	14	15
24	(Italy) Marcellino Lucchi	Aprilia			4		Ret												13
25	(Spain) Jerónimo Vidal	Aprilia	18	16	17	Ret	15	Ret	9	Ret	13	22	15	18	Ret	15	19		13
26	(Spain) David Tomás	Honda	DNQ		25	19	17	22	10	16	15	21	16	22	14	14	16	Ret	11
27	(Japan) Nobuyuki Ohsaki	Yamaha													10				6
28	(Japan) Hiroshi Aoyama	Honda	13												21				3
29	(Japan) Osamu Miyazaki	Yamaha													13				3
30	(Germany) Katja Poensgen	Aprilia	22	24	23	DNS	14	26	Ret	23	20								2
30	(Germany) Katja Poensgen	Honda											20	24	26	19	Ret	26	2
31	(United Kingdom) Jason Vincent	Yamaha										23	14	Ret	22	Ret	18	20	2
32	(Netherlands) Jarno Boesveld	Yamaha							15										1
	(Germany) Dirk Heidolf	Yamaha									16								0
	(Brazil) César Barros	Yamaha	DNQ	21	24	25	Ret	DNS	25	25	Ret	28	Ret	21	Ret	16	DNS	24	0
	(Germany) Christian Gemmel	Honda									17								0
	(Italy) Diego Giugovaz	Yamaha	21	22	20	Ret	DSQ		Ret	20	Ret								0
	(Italy) Diego Giugovaz	Aprilia													25	17	21	Ret	0
	(Germany) Max Neukirchner	Honda									18								0
	(Spain) Luis Costa	Yamaha					19	25	22	21	19	24	19	Ret	24	18	22	21	0
	(France) Julien Allemand	Yamaha	Ret	18	19	DNS													0
	(Japan) Shinichi Nakatomi	Honda	19																0
	(United Kingdom) Stuart Edwards	TSR-Honda	Ret																0
	(United Kingdom) Stuart Edwards	Honda		Ret	26	22	DNQ	Ret	Ret	19	Ret	Ret							0
	(United Kingdom) Stuart Edwards	Yamaha											DNS	23	Ret	20	DNQ	19	0
	(Japan) Daisuke Sakai	Honda													20				0
	(Japan) Tekkyu Kayo	TSR-Honda	20																0
	(Spain) Álvaro Molina	Yamaha			22			24						20					0
	(Spain) Javier Díaz	Honda											21						0
	(Netherlands) Gert Pieper	Honda							21										0
	(France) Hervé Mora	Honda				21													0
	(Spain) Ismael Bonilla	Honda			21														0
	(United States) Jason DiSalvo	Honda							Ret	22		26							0
	(Spain) Michael Garcia	Aprilia											22	DNQ					0
	(Netherlands) Arnold Litjens	Honda							23										0
	(France) Guillaume Dietrich	Honda				23													0
	(South Africa) Jonathan Van Vuuren	Yamaha		23															0
	(Australia) Shaun Geronimi	Yamaha															23	25	0
	(United Kingdom) Michael Herzberg	Yamaha								24									0
	(France) David Fouloi	Yamaha				24													0
	(Hungary) Gábor Rizmayer	Honda										25		Ret					0
	(France) Tom Ouvrard	Yamaha				26													0
	(Germany) Norman Rank	Honda										27							0
	(Spain) Dámaso Nácher	Honda			27								DNQ	DNQ				Ret	0
	(Brazil) Cristiano Vieira	Yamaha																Ret	0
	(Australia) Mark Rowling	Yamaha														Ret			0
	(Australia) Shane Smith	Honda														Ret			0
	(Japan) Takayuki Onodera	Yamaha													Ret				0
	(Slovakia) Vladimír Častka	Yamaha										Ret							0
	(Germany) Marcel Schneider	Honda									Ret								0
	(United Kingdom) Gary Jackson	Honda								Ret									0
	(United Kingdom) Stuart Easton	Honda								Ret									0
	(France) Hugo Marchand	Honda				Ret													0
	(Spain) Iván Silva	Honda		DSQ															0
	(Australia) Josh Brookes	Yamaha														DNS			0
	(France) Vincent Philippe	Honda									DNS								0
	(South Africa) Shane Norval	Honda								DNS									0
	(Japan) Choujun Kameya	Yamaha	DNS																0
	(Brazil) Rafael Da Cunha	Honda																DNQ	
	(Australia) Earl Lynch	Yamaha														DNQ			
	(Australia) Terry Carter	Yamaha														DNQ			
	(Spain) Isaac Martín	Honda												DNQ					
	(Portugal) José Estrela	Honda											DNQ						
	(Germany) Henrik Voit	Honda										DNQ							
Pos	Rider	Bike	JPN (Japan)	RSA (South Africa)	ESP (Spain)	FRA (France)	ITA (Italy)	CAT (Catalonia)	NED (Netherlands)	GBR (United Kingdom)	GER (Germany)	CZE (Czech Republic)	POR (Portugal)	VAL (Valencian Community)	PAC (Tochigi Prefecture)	AUS (Australia)	MAL (Malaysia)	RIO (Rio de Janeiro (state))	Pts

Colour	Result
Gold	Winner
Silver	Second place
Bronze	Third place
Green	Points classification
Blue	Non-points classification
Blue	Non-classified finish (NC)
Purple	Retired, not classified (Ret)
Red	Did not qualify (DNQ)
Red	Did not pre-qualify (DNPQ)
Black	Disqualified (DSQ)
White	Did not start (DNS)
White	Withdrew (WD)
White	Race cancelled (C)
Blank	Did not practice (DNP)
Blank	Did not arrive (DNA)
Blank	Excluded (EX)

**Bold** – Pole position
Italics – Fastest lap

=== 125cc riders' standings ===
Scoring system

Points were awarded to the top fifteen finishers. A rider had to finish the race to earn points.

Position	**1st**	**2nd**	**3rd**	**4th**	**5th**	**6th**	**7th**	**8th**	**9th**	**10th**	**11th**	**12th**	**13th**	**14th**	**15th**
Points	25	20	16	13	11	10	9	8	7	6	5	4	3	2	1

Pos	Rider	Bike	JPN (Japan)	RSA (South Africa)	ESP (Spain)	FRA (France)	ITA (Italy)	CAT (Catalonia)	NED (Netherlands)	GBR (United Kingdom)	GER (Germany)	CZE (Czech Republic)	POR (Portugal)	VAL (Valencian Community)	PAC (Tochigi Prefecture)	AUS (Australia)	MAL (Malaysia)	RIO (Rio de Janeiro (state))	Pts
1	(San Marino) Manuel Poggiali	Gilera	5	2	Ret	1	3	3	Ret	3	3	Ret	**1**	1	2	**2**	2	5	241
2	(Japan) Youichi Ui	Derbi	**2**	**1**	**Ret**	**11**	**18**	5	Ret	1	19	4	2	4	**1**	1	1	**1**	232
3	(Spain) Toni Elías	Honda	16	18	13	3	4	2	1	**2**	2	**1**	3	**2**	Ret	3	**6**	4	217
4	(Italy) Lucio Cecchinello	Aprilia	6	19	2	5	Ret	**1**	Ret	5	5	2	16	8	4	5	3	Ret	156
5	(Japan) Masao Azuma	Honda	1	10	1	8	8	Ret	Ret	4	4	13	Ret	23	5	4	8	7	142
6	(Italy) Gino Borsoi	Aprilia	4	4	3	4	2	18	**6**	8	Ret	23	15	5	8	10	5	20	130
7	(Italy) Simone Sanna	Aprilia	3	DNS	Ret	13	5	10	11	6	1	10	4	6	Ret	Ret	16	2	125
8	(Spain) Daniel Pedrosa	Honda	18	13	10	17	23	7	Ret	12	11	8	5	3	3	7	4	Ret	100
9	(Japan) Noboru Ueda	TSR-Honda	Ret	3	4	7	1	Ret	4	23	DNS	11	Ret	Ret	Ret	11	11	13	94
10	(France) Arnaud Vincent	Honda	9	6	11	6	7	14	2	18	Ret	Ret	10	18	Ret	21	7	3	94
11	(Germany) Steve Jenkner	Aprilia	7	8	Ret	12	12	4	3	7	10	3	Ret	7	Ret	17	Ret	17	94
12	(Italy) Mirko Giansanti	Honda	8	12	Ret	2	DNS	16	7	11	14	16	8	13	7	Ret	9	Ret	75
13	(Italy) Max Sabbatani	Honda	12	7	8	15	Ret	21	15	15	**7**	5	9	9	Ret	8	10	Ret	72
14	(San Marino) Alex de Angelis	Honda	14	9	7	14	10	9	Ret	Ret	12	12	Ret	Ret	Ret	6	14	6	63
15	(Czech Republic) Jaroslav Huleš	Honda	17	22	9	9	15	Ret	8	Ret	6	7	7	Ret	14	14	15	10	62
16	(Spain) Ángel Nieto Jr.	Honda	11	5	5	10	6	12	Ret	Ret	13	19	Ret	16	13	13	Ret	Ret	56
17	(Czech Republic) Jakub Smrž	Honda	21	Ret	15	18	Ret	19	5	13	9	6	6	21	Ret	19	Ret	8	50
18	(Hungary) Gábor Talmácsi	Honda	23	21	17	16	14	17	Ret	10	18	9	12	11	6	28	20	Ret	34
19	(Spain) Joan Olivé	Honda	19	16	14	Ret	16	8	Ret	14	15	14	Ret	10	12	27	12	11	34
20	(Spain) Ángel Rodríguez	Aprilia	Ret	Ret	6	DNS	20	Ret	Ret	9	8	17	Ret	15	15	23	17	Ret	27
21	(Italy) Stefano Perugini	Italjet	Ret	11	12	Ret	Ret	11	12	Ret	16	Ret	Ret	12	Ret	16	13	Ret	25
22	(Italy) Gianluigi Scalvini	Italjet	13	14	Ret	DNS	Ret	13	Ret	Ret	22	Ret	18	22	9	18	Ret	9	22
23	(Italy) Alessandro Brannetti	Aprilia	Ret	17	Ret		13	20	9	Ret	17	20	11	20	10	22	Ret	15	22
24	(Spain) Pablo Nieto	Derbi	10	15	Ret	DNS	Ret	6	Ret	Ret	Ret	18	Ret	14	16	20	Ret	14	21
25	(Germany) Jarno Müller	Honda	24	23	18	19	9	15	10	DNS	WD				19	25	21	12	18
26	(Spain) Raúl Jara	Aprilia	Ret	24	19	Ret	17	23	14	22	23	Ret	14	25	11	24	18	18	9
27	(Andorra) Eric Bataille	Honda	Ret	20	20	20	Ret	DNS	17	19	20	15	DNS	17	Ret	9	Ret	Ret	8
28	(Italy) Andrea Ballerini	Aprilia					11											Ret	5
29	(Australia) Casey Stoner	Honda								17						12			4
30	(Italy) Gaspare Caffiero	Aprilia	Ret	Ret	Ret	23	19	22	Ret	16	DNS	21	13	19	17	15	19		4
31	(Spain) Adrián Araujo	Honda						24	13	21	Ret	22	17	24	21	Ret	23	16	3
32	(Japan) Hiroyuki Kikuchi	Honda	15																1
	(Italy) Marco Petrini	Honda	Ret	Ret	Ret	21	21	Ret	16	20	21	Ret	Ret						0
	(Japan) Toshihisa Kuzuhara	Honda													18				0
	(Netherlands) Wilhelm van Leeuwen	Honda							18										0
	(Brazil) Leandro Panadés	Honda																19	0
	(Netherlands) Ronnie Timmer	Yamaha							19										0
	(Germany) Jascha Büch	Honda										24	19	26					0
	(Portugal) José Leite	Honda											20						0
	(Japan) Masafumi Ono	Honda	20																0
	(San Marino) William de Angelis	Honda												Ret	20	29	22	Ret	0
	(Italy) Michele Conti	Honda					22												0
	(France) Jimmy Petit	Honda				22													0
	(Japan) Yuzo Fujioka	ERP Honda	22												Ret				0
	(Germany) Andreas Hahn	Honda									24								0
	(France) Erwan Nigon	Yamaha				24													0
	(Germany) Claudius Klein	Honda									25								0
	(France) Xavier Hérouin	Honda				25													0
	(Germany) Tobias Kirmeier	Honda									26	25							0
	(Germany) Philipp Hafeneger	Honda	25	Ret	Ret	26	DNS												0
	(Australia) Jay Taylor	Honda														26			0
	(Czech Republic) Igor Kaláb	Honda										26							0
	(Spain) Héctor Faubel	Aprilia			26									Ret					0
	(Czech Republic) Matěj Smrž	Aprilia										27							0
	(Germany) René Knöfler	Yamaha									27								0
	(France) Julien Enjolras	Honda				27													0
	(Czech Republic) Václav Bittman	Honda										28							0
	(Czech Republic) Tomáš Mikšovský	Honda										29							0
	(Australia) Cath Thompson	Honda														Ret			0
	(Australia) Peter Galvin	Honda														Ret			0
	(Japan) Hideyuki Nakajoh	Honda	Ret												Ret				0
	(Japan) Shuhei Aoyama	Honda													Ret				0
	(Japan) Yuki Takahashi	E-NER													Ret				0
	(Italy) Fabrizio Lai	Rieju												Ret					0
	(Spain) Javier Forés	Aprilia												Ret					0
	(Finland) Mika Kallio	Honda									Ret			Ret					0
	(Spain) José Luis Nión	Honda											Ret						0
	(United Kingdom) Chris Martin	Honda								Ret									0
	(United Kingdom) Paul Robinson	Honda								Ret									0
	(Netherlands) Adri den Bekker	Honda							Ret										0
	(Netherlands) Patrick Lakerveld	Honda							Ret										0
	(Spain) Daniel Piñera	Honda			Ret			Ret											0
	(Italy) Andrea Dovizioso	Aprilia					Ret												0
	(France) Grégory Lefort	Aprilia				Ret													0
	(Japan) Naoki Katoh	Honda	Ret																0
	(Australia) Andrew Brooks	Honda														DNQ			
	(Portugal) João Pinto	Honda											DNQ						
	(Portugal) José Monteiro	Honda											DNQ						
	(Portugal) Ricardo Tomé	Aprilia											DNQ						
	(South Africa) Jason Wessels	Aprilia		DNQ															
	(United Kingdom) Sam Owens	Honda								WD									
Pos	Rider	Bike	JPN (Japan)	RSA (South Africa)	ESP (Spain)	FRA (France)	ITA (Italy)	CAT (Catalonia)	NED (Netherlands)	GBR (United Kingdom)	GER (Germany)	CZE (Czech Republic)	POR (Portugal)	VAL (Valencian Community)	PAC (Tochigi Prefecture)	AUS (Australia)	MAL (Malaysia)	RIO (Rio de Janeiro (state))	Pts

Colour	Result
Gold	Winner
Silver	Second place
Bronze	Third place
Green	Points classification
Blue	Non-points classification
Blue	Non-classified finish (NC)
Purple	Retired, not classified (Ret)
Red	Did not qualify (DNQ)
Red	Did not pre-qualify (DNPQ)
Black	Disqualified (DSQ)
White	Did not start (DNS)
White	Withdrew (WD)
White	Race cancelled (C)
Blank	Did not practice (DNP)
Blank	Did not arrive (DNA)
Blank	Excluded (EX)

**Bold** – Pole position
Italics – Fastest lap

=== 500cc manufacturers' standings ===
Pos	Manufacturer	JPN (Japan)	RSA (South Africa)	ESP (Spain)	FRA (France)	ITA (Italy)	CAT (Catalonia)	NED (Netherlands)	GBR (United Kingdom)	GER (Germany)	CZE (Czech Republic)	POR (Portugal)	VAL (Valencian Community)	PAC (Tochigi Prefecture)	AUS (Australia)	MAL (Malaysia)	RIO (Rio de Janeiro (state))	Pts
1	(Japan) Honda	1	1	1	3	1	1	2	1	5	1	1	2	1	1	1	1	367
2	(Japan) Yamaha	2	4	2	1	3	2	1	2	1	4	3	4	4	2	3	2	295
3	(Japan) Suzuki	7	7	7	6	6	5	6	8	9	8	6	1	8	9	8	12	153
4	(Malaysia) Proton KR	11	11	13	10	12	9	9	12	14	Ret	7	9	Ret	10	Ret	Ret	65
5	(United Kingdom) Sabre V4	Ret	18	17	Ret	Ret	17	18	18	Ret	15	13	14	Ret	17	Ret		6
6	(New Zealand) Pulse	Ret	20	18	Ret	13	16	16	19	16								3
	(Italy) Paton			DNQ		DNQ			WD		Ret							0
Pos	Manufacturer	JPN (Japan)	RSA (South Africa)	ESP (Spain)	FRA (France)	ITA (Italy)	CAT (Catalonia)	NED (Netherlands)	GBR (United Kingdom)	GER (Germany)	CZE (Czech Republic)	POR (Portugal)	VAL (Valencian Community)	PAC (Tochigi Prefecture)	AUS (Australia)	MAL (Malaysia)	RIO (Rio de Janeiro (state))	Pts

=== 250cc manufacturers' standings ===
Pos	Manufacturer	JPN (Japan)	RSA (South Africa)	ESP (Spain)	FRA (France)	ITA (Italy)	CAT (Catalonia)	NED (Netherlands)	GBR (United Kingdom)	GER (Germany)	CZE (Czech Republic)	POR (Portugal)	VAL (Valencian Community)	PAC (Tochigi Prefecture)	AUS (Australia)	MAL (Malaysia)	RIO (Rio de Janeiro (state))	Pts
1	(Japan) Honda	1	1	1	1	6	1	2	1	2	3	1	1	2	1	1	1	361
2	(Italy) Aprilia	2	2	2	2	1	2	1	2	1	1	2	2	1	2	2	2	345
3	(Japan) Yamaha	4	7	12	8	9	10	3	5	8	8	6	6	7	9	7	9	142
	(Japan) TSR-Honda	20																0
Pos	Manufacturer	JPN (Japan)	RSA (South Africa)	ESP (Spain)	FRA (France)	ITA (Italy)	CAT (Catalonia)	NED (Netherlands)	GBR (United Kingdom)	GER (Germany)	CZE (Czech Republic)	POR (Portugal)	VAL (Valencian Community)	PAC (Tochigi Prefecture)	AUS (Australia)	MAL (Malaysia)	RIO (Rio de Janeiro (state))	Pts

=== 125cc manufacturers' standings ===
Pos	Manufacturer	JPN (Japan)	RSA (South Africa)	ESP (Spain)	FRA (France)	ITA (Italy)	CAT (Catalonia)	NED (Netherlands)	GBR (United Kingdom)	GER (Germany)	CZE (Czech Republic)	POR (Portugal)	VAL (Valencian Community)	PAC (Tochigi Prefecture)	AUS (Australia)	MAL (Malaysia)	RIO (Rio de Janeiro (state))	Pts
1	(Japan) Honda	1	5	1	2	4	2	1	2	2	1	3	2	3	3	4	3	301
2	(Italy) Aprilia	3	4	2	4	2	1	3	5	1	2	4	5	4	5	3	2	263
3	(Italy) Gilera	5	2	Ret	1	3	3	Ret	3	3	Ret	1	1	2	2	2	5	241
4	(Spain) Derbi	2	1	Ret	11	18	5	Ret	1	19	4	2	4	1	1	1	1	232
5	(Japan) TSR-Honda	Ret	3	4	7	1	Ret	4	23	DNS	12	Ret	Ret	Ret	11	11	13	94
6	(Italy) Italjet	13	11	12	Ret	Ret	11	12	Ret	16	Ret	18	12	9	16	13	9	42
	(Japan) Yamaha				24			19		27								0
	(Japan) ERP Honda	22																0
	(Spain) Rieju												Ret					0
	(Japan) E-NER													Ret				0
Pos	Manufacturer	JPN (Japan)	RSA (South Africa)	ESP (Spain)	FRA (France)	ITA (Italy)	CAT (Catalonia)	NED (Netherlands)	GBR (United Kingdom)	GER (Germany)	CZE (Czech Republic)	POR (Portugal)	VAL (Valencian Community)	PAC (Tochigi Prefecture)	AUS (Australia)	MAL (Malaysia)	RIO (Rio de Janeiro (state))	Pts
