= Yamaha YZR250 =

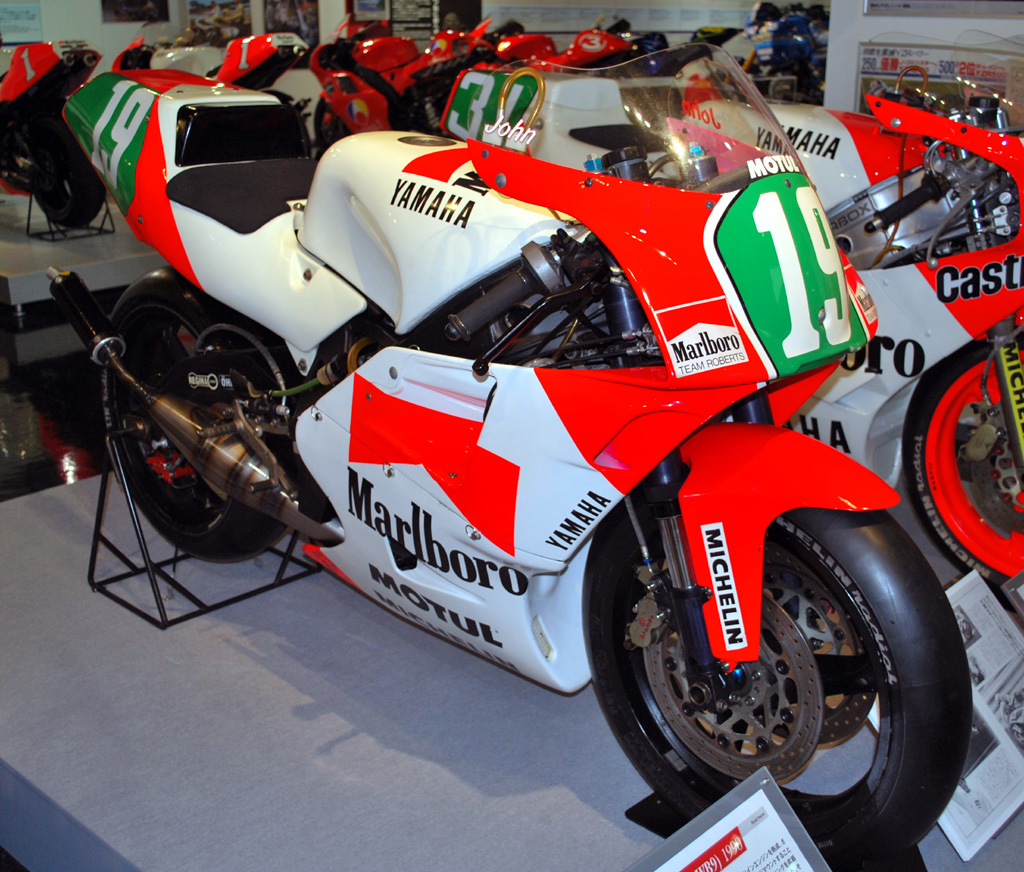
- Manufacturer: Yamaha Motor Company
- Production: 1973–2003
- Class: 250cc Grand Prix motorcycle
- Engine: two-stroke liquid-cooled 249 cc (15.2 cu in) 60°-90° V-twin
- Power: 75–80 hp (56–60 kW)
- Transmission: 6-speed
- Weight: < 100 kg (220 lb) (dry)
- Related: Yamaha YZR500

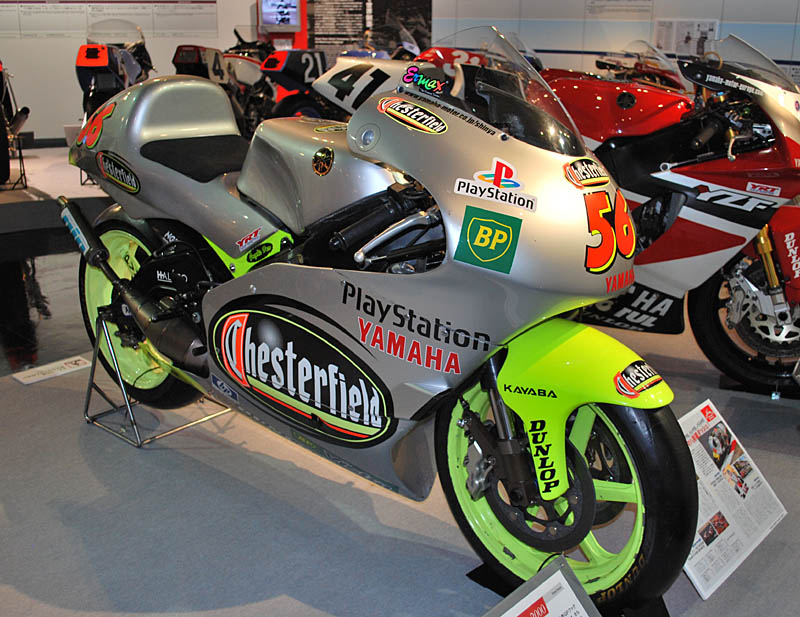
2000 version of the YZR250

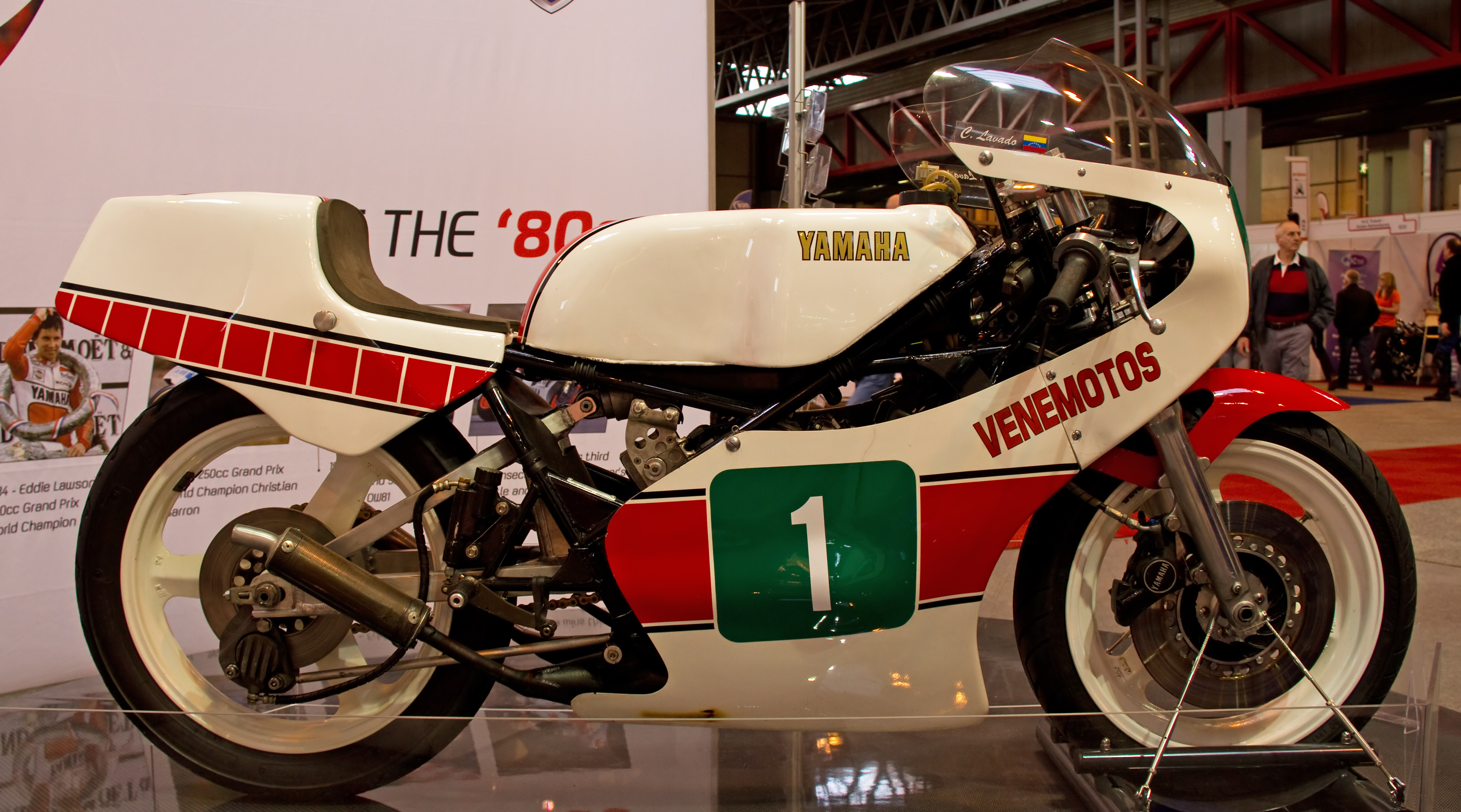
1983 version of the YZR250

The Yamaha YZR 250 was a 250 cc Grand Prix racing motorcycle made by Yamaha from 1973 until 2003.
