= Simone Sanna =

Italian motorcycle racer (born 1978)

- Nationality: Italian
- Born: 16 March 1978 (age 48); Florence
Motorcycle racing career statistics
Grand Prix motorcycle racing
Active years	1997, 1999 - 2002, 2004
First race	1997 125cc Italian Grand Prix
Last race	2004 125cc British Grand Prix
First win	2000 125cc Catalan Grand Prix
Last win	2001 125cc German Grand Prix
Starts / Wins / Podiums / Poles / F. laps / Points; 66 / 3 / 9 / 0 / 1 / 486

Simone Sanna (born 16 March 1978 in Florence) is an Italian Grand Prix motorcycle road racer. His best year was in 2000 when he won two Grand Prix races and finished the season ranked sixth in the 125cc world championship. In 2006 and 2007, Sanna raced in the Supersport World Championship.
