= Brendan Clarke (motorcyclist) =

Australian motorcycle racer

- Nationality: Australian
- Born: 23 February 1984 (age 42); Brisbane, Australia

Brendan Clarke (born 23 February 1984) is a Grand Prix motorcycle racer from Australia.

== Career statistics ==
=== By season ===
Season	Class	Motorcycle	Race	Win	Podium	Pole	FLap	Pts	Plcd
2001	500cc	Honda	8	0	0	0	0	5	23rd
Total			8	0	0	0	0	5	
