= Chuck Sorensen =

American motorcycle racer

Chuck Sorensen (born August 14, 1972, in the United States) is an American motorcycle racer. He began in 1989 and became a professional in 1993.

== By season ==
Season	Class	Motorcycle	Race	Win	Podium	Pole	FLap	Pts	Plcd
2002	250cc	Aprilia	1	0	0	0	0	0	NC
Total			1	0	0	0	0	0	

=== Races by year ===
(key)

Year	Class	Bike	1	2	3	4	5	6	7	8	9	10	11	12	13	14	15	16	Pos	Pts
2002	250cc	Aprilia	JPN	RSA	SPA	FRA	ITA	CAT	NED	GBR	GER	CZE	POR	BRA	PAC	MAL	AUS	VAL; 21	NC	0
