= 2002 Grand Prix motorcycle racing season =

Sports season

2002 F.I.M. Grand Prix motorcycle racing season

Seasons
- ← 2001 2003 →

2002 World Champions

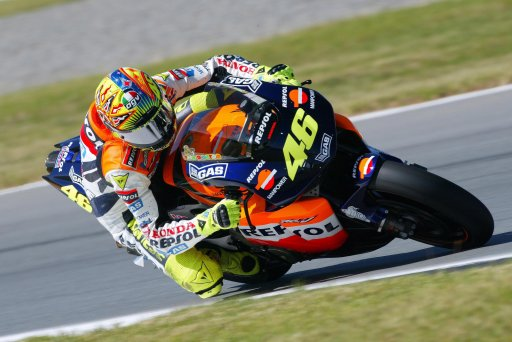
Valentino Rossi became the MotoGP World Champion

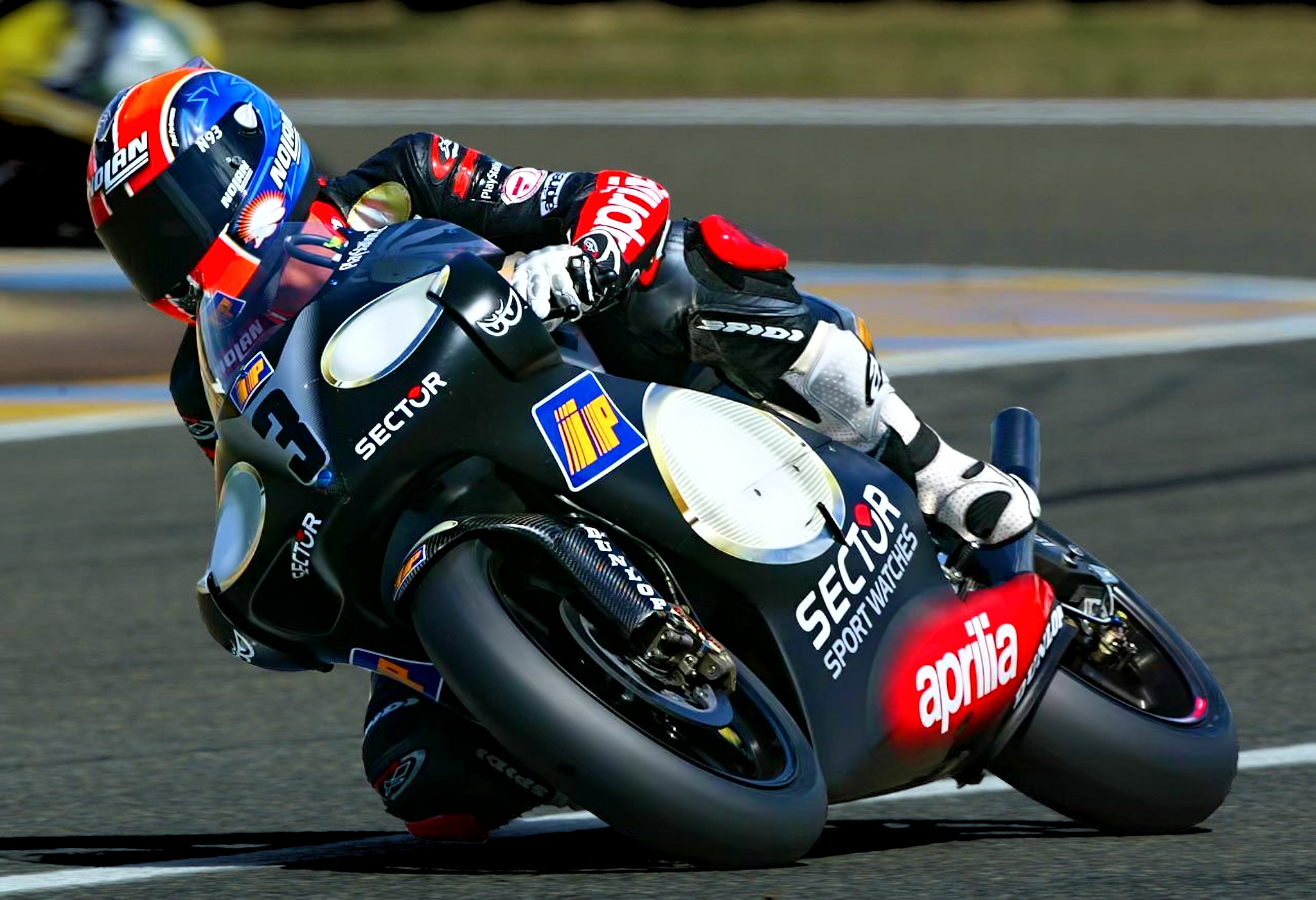
Marco Melandri became the 250cc World Champion

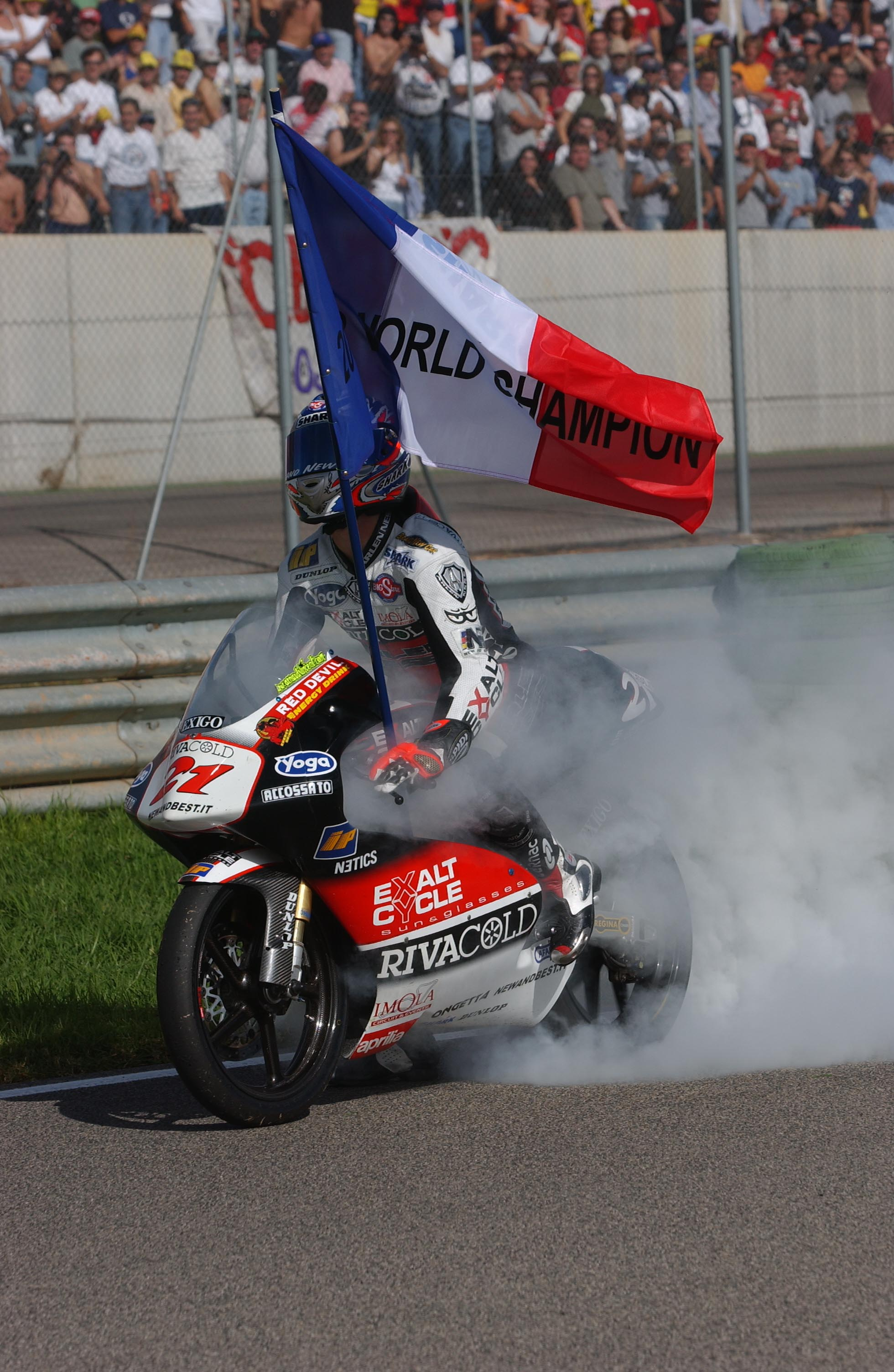
Arnaud Vincent became the 125cc World Champion

The 2002 Grand Prix motorcycle racing season was the 54th F.I.M. Road racing World Championship season. The season consisted of 16 races, beginning with the Japanese motorcycle Grand Prix on 7 April 2002 and ending with the Valencian Community motorcycle Grand Prix on 3 November.

The premier class, now renamed MotoGP, introduced new rules and regulations which allowed 990cc four-stroke bikes to race alongside the previous year's 500cc two-stroke bikes. Defending champion Valentino Rossi won his second premier class title by winning 11 races and scoring 355 points. He clinched the title at the Rio de Janeiro Grand Prix, with four races left in the season.

The 250cc title was won by Marco Melandri who won nine races and scored 298 points. He clinched the title at the Australian Grand Prix and became the youngest ever champion in the 250cc class. Arnaud Vincent won the 125cc title by 19 points difference over defending champion Manuel Poggiali. The title was decided in the last race of the season at Valencia with Vincent finishing in second place to secure the title.

== Season summary ==
=== MotoGP class ===
The season marked the start of a new era in the premier class with the arrival of 990cc four-stroke bikes. Four factory teams, Repsol Honda, Marlboro Yamaha, Suzuki and Aprilia, raced with the new four-stroke bikes while all the satellite teams raced with the 500cc two-stroke bike. The season also marked the return of Dunlop and the entry of Bridgestone to the premier class. Dunlop supplied the tyres for Suzuki, Aprilia, Yamaha WCM and Pramac Honda. Bridgestone supplied the tyres for Team Roberts and Kanemoto Racing. Michelin supplied the tyres for the remaining six teams. However, after only two races, Suzuki switched back to Michelin tyres for the remainder of the season.

Valentino Rossi, riding the four-stroke Honda RC211V bike, won the first race of the season at Suzuka under wet conditions. Suzuki's test rider Akira Ryō, who raced as a wildcard entry, and Yamaha's Carlos Checa completed the all four-stroke podium. Rossi's teammate, Tohru Ukawa, won the second race before Rossi went on to dominate the championship by winning seven consecutive races. Max Biaggi handed the four-stroke Yamaha YZR-M1 its first win in the Czech Republic Grand Prix at Brno, while Rossi had to retire due to tyre problems. In that race, Honda also expanded their four-stroke presence by providing the RC211V bike for Honda Gresini rider Daijiro Kato. Rossi then won two consecutive races in Portugal and Brazil, clinching the world championship in the latter.

In the Pacific Grand Prix, Honda Pons rider Alex Barros won his first race riding the RC211V bike. In that race, Kawasaki returned to the world championship after 20 years absence. Kawasaki, with their four-stroke Ninja ZX-RR, raced as wildcards in the last four races of the season as a preparation before entering the championship full-time in the following season. In the following race at Sepang, Yamaha expanded their four-stroke presence by providing the YZR-M1 bikes to Tech 3 pair Olivier Jacque and Shinya Nakano. Another Yamaha rider, Norifumi Abe, raced the fifth YZR-M1 on the grid for the last two races of the season.

Rossi ended the season with 355 points from 11 wins and four second places. Biaggi finished second to Rossi with 215 points and two race wins. Ukawa and Barros completed the top four with 209 and 204 points respectively. Previous year's 250cc champion Daijiro Kato finished in seventh position with two podium finishes and was named as the Rookie of the Year. All races were won by the four-stroke bikes, while the two-strokes only managed to record five podiums finishes; accounting for riders that received four-stroke upgrades, Loris Capirossi finished just below Kato in eighth as the top two-stroke only rider. Honda won the constructors championship with 390 points and 14 wins, followed by Yamaha who won the other two races. Repsol Honda team won the teams championship by winning 12 races and scoring 564 points from Rossi and Ukawa. Marlboro Yamaha and Honda Pons who won two races each was second and third respectively.

=== 250cc class ===
The 250cc class was certain to have a new champion as previous year's champion Daijiro Kato and 1993 champion Tetsuya Harada, who finished second to Kato last year, both moved up to the MotoGP class. Only three riders remained from previous year's top six: Marco Melandri, Roberto Rolfo and Fonsi Nieto. Melandri was the only rider in the 250cc class who has previously won a 250cc race; he won his first and only race in the 2001 German Grand Prix. The 250cc entry list also included three former 125cc World Champion: Haruchika Aoki, Roberto Locatelli and Emilio Alzamora.

The season started with a wet race at Suzuka which was won by Japanese wildcard rider Osamu Miyazaki, who was riding for Daytona Yamaha team. Honda's wildcard rider Daisaku Sakai and Aprilia's Randy de Puniet completed the podium. In the following race at Welkom, Aprilia's Marco Melandri took his second career 250cc win. Fonsi Nieto then took his first ever race win in the Spanish Grand Prix. Nieto also took the lead in the championship standings from de Puniet and Franco Battaini. Nieto then won the following race at Le Mans before Melandri won the next three races and overtook the championship lead from Nieto after the Dutch TT. Melandri continued his streak to six consecutive wins and extended his lead in the standings to 37 points after the Czech Republic Grand Prix.

Nieto won the Portuguese Grand Prix for Aprilia's tenth consecutive victory. Nieto, who crashed in lap 13, recovered from seventh position to win the rain-soaked race over Melandri. Aprilia's winning streak was broken when Yamaha's Sebastián Porto won the Rio de Janeiro Grand Prix under wet race condition. Rookie Toni Elías won the following race at Motegi after a last-lap battle with Melandri. Melandri finished second and increase his lead over Nieto in the championship standings to 52 points. With 52 points lead and three races to go, Melandri only need to finish in front of Nieto in the Malaysian Grand Prix to clinch the championship. However, he suffered a mechanical failure on the first lap, while Nieto won the race to reduce the gap to 27 points. Melandri finally clinched the 250cc title in the Australian Grand Prix with a close win over Nieto. They fought until the last lap and Melandri won the race with just 0.007 second gap at the finish line. Melandri became the youngest 250cc world champion at the age of 20 years and 74 days.

Melandri ended the season with 298 points from nine race wins, three second-place finishes and one fourth-place finish. Nieto finished second in the standings with 241 points and four wins, followed Honda's Roberto Rolfo and rookie Toni Elías with 219 and 178 points respectively. Elías, who recorded one race win and four further podium finishes, was named as the Rookie of the Year. Aprilia won the constructors championship with 382 points and 14 race wins from Melandri, Nieto and Elías. Honda finished second in the standings with 244 points but failed to record any race win. Yamaha, who won two races courtesy of Miyazaki and Porto's wins in the wet, finished third with 211 points.

=== 125cc class ===
The 125cc entry list was headlined by defending champion Manuel Poggiali and two-time championship runners-up Youichi Ui and Noboru Ueda. There were five other riders who have previously won a 125cc race: Masao Azuma, Lucio Cecchinello, Stefano Perugini, Simone Sanna and Arnaud Vincent.

Arnaud Vincent, who returned to Aprilia after a year with Honda, won the opening race at Suzuka under wet condition. He then extended his lead in the championship with two second places in the second and third race behind Manuel Poggiali and Lucio Cecchinello respectively. In the following race at Le Mans, Cecchinello won his second successive race ahead of Poggiali, while Vincent finished fourth. Poggiali then took over the championship lead from Vincent after winning the Italian Grand Prix. Poggiali won the following race at Catalunya with a late overtake at the finish line over Spanish teenager Daniel Pedrosa. Two weeks later, Pedrosa bounced back to win his first ever race in the 2002 Dutch TT, with Poggiali finishing in second place.

Vincent, who led the championship in the first four races, returned to the top of the podium with two consecutive wins at Donington Park and Sachsenring. After finishing third behind Cecchinello and Pedrosa at Brno, Vincent won the wet Portuguese Grand Prix and retook the championship lead from Poggiali. Honda riders, Masao Azuma and Pedrosa, won the following two races at Rio de Janeiro and Motegi while Poggiali reduced Vincent's lead to just eight points courtesy of two podium finishes and Vincent's mechanical problem at Motegi. Vincent extended his lead by winning the Malaysian Grand Prix while Poggiali finished in fourth. However, Poggiali won the following race at Phillip Island while Vincent finished in fourth to reduce the lead back to eight points. In the last race of the season at Valencia, Vincent finished second behind Pedrosa to clinch the 125cc title while Poggiali finished in seventh place.

Vincent ended the season with 273 points and five race wins, 19 points ahead of defending champion Poggiali who scored 254 points and four race wins. Pedrosa and Cecchinello finished third and fourth in the standings with three wins each. The Rookie of the Year title was won by Finnish rider Mika Kallio who scored 78 points with the Red Devil Honda team. Aprilia won the constructors championship with 341 points and eight race wins from Vincent and Cecchinello. Honda finished second in the standings with 285 points and four wins from Pedrosa and Azuma while Gilera finished third with 254 points and three wins from Poggiali.

== 2002 Grand Prix season calendar ==
On 18 October 2001, the FIM confirmed the 2002 calendar. On 4 December 2001, the FIM confirmed that the dates of the Rio and Valencian Community Grands Prix had swapped places.

The following sixteen Grands Prix were scheduled to take place:

Round	Date	Grand Prix	Circuit
1	7 April	SKYY vodka Grand Prix of Japan	Suzuka Circuit
2	21 April	(South Africa) Africa's Grand Prix †	Phakisa Freeway
3	5 May	(Spain) Gran Premio Marlboro de España	Circuito de Jerez
4	19 May	Polini Grand Prix de France	Bugatti Circuit
5	2 June	(Italy) Gran Premio Cinzano d'Italia	Mugello Circuit
6	16 June	(Catalonia) Gran Premi Marlboro de Catalunya	Circuit de Catalunya
7	29 June ††	(Netherlands) Gauloises Dutch TT	TT Circuit Assen
8	14 July	(United Kingdom) Cinzano British Grand Prix	Donington Park
9	21 July	(Germany) Cinzano Motorrad Grand Prix Deutschland	Sachsenring
10	25 August	(Czech Republic) Gauloises Grand Prix České republiky	Brno Circuit
11	8 September	Grande Prémio Marlboro de Portugal	Autódromo do Estoril
12	21 September ††	(Rio de Janeiro (state)) Cinzano Rio Grand Prix	Autódromo Internacional Nelson Piquet
13	6 October	(Tochigi Prefecture) Gauloises Pacific Grand Prix of Motegi	Twin Ring Motegi
14	13 October	(Malaysia) Gauloises Malaysian Motorcycle Grand Prix	Sepang International Circuit
15	20 October	(Australia) SKYY vodka Australian Grand Prix	Phillip Island Grand Prix Circuit
16	3 November	(Valencian Community) Gran Premio Marlboro de la Comunitat Valenciana	Circuit Ricardo Tormo

† = Gauloises was the original sponsor for the South African Grand Prix, but withdrew due to South African government passing a ban on tobacco advertising in motorsport events a week before the race.
†† = Saturday race

=== Calendar changes ===
- The Malaysian and Australian Grand Prix swapped places. The Malaysian round became the 14th round, while the Australian round became the 15th round on the calendar.
- The Valencian Community Grand Prix swapped position with the Rio Grand Prix. The Valencian round became the last race of the season as the world championship returned to Europe after four flyaway races that started with Rio Grand Prix.

== Regulation changes ==
The following changes are made to the regulation for the 2002 season:

=== Sporting regulations ===
- The name '500cc', which was already used formally since 2000 on promotional material, is now officially changed to 'MotoGP'.
- All riders in the new MotoGP class must possess an FIM Grand Prix Super License.
- The maximum age of new riders to participate in the 125cc class has been set at the new standard of 25 years. This also counts for wildcard riders.
- It is now mandatory for manufacturers in all classes to own a FIM Manufacturers License.
- If a rider has been entered for participation of a 125cc or 250cc race, the team is not allowed to replace said rider after 17:30 on the first day of the event, which is Friday. An exception is made in the case of the MotoGP class where substitutions can be made up until 12:00 on the second day of the event, which is Saturday.
- In case of a home grand prix, each grand prix host federation (FMNR) may enter three wildcard riders for the 125cc and 250cc classes.
- The MSMA can also nominate one wildcard entry for the 250cc and MotoGP classes at all given races.
- The FIM may nominate two wildcard entries for the 125cc and 250cc classes as well.
- Dorna, together with the FIM, can nominate one wildcard entry for the MotoGP class at all races.
- The timetable for qualifying has been changed: The start time for the 125cc has gone from 13:15 to 13:45, the start time for the MotoGP has gone from 14:00 to 15:00 and the 250cc start time has gone from 15:15 to 16:00.
- Restrictions are imposed on the practice sessions. If there is a break in the championship that lasts two or more consecutive weekends, the testing exceptions will not apply from 09:00 that Wednesday until the start of the following race. The winter testing for the 125cc and 250cc teams will either be restricted to their own continental zones or official IRTA tests.
- Starter engines may now also be used on the grid. The number of people for each rider on the grid has been set to seven in the MotoGP class and to a maximum of two, three minutes before the start of a race.
- Riders will only be permitted to start the race from their assigned grid position if they complete at least one sighting lap. It is forbidden for anyone, even the rider, to push the motorcycle onto the grid from the pit lane.
- Riders are allowed to complete more than one sighting lap via the pit lane if they make any changes on their main bike, swap bikes or have to refuel.
- Riders who fail to complete at least one sighting lap will have to start the warm-up lap at the back of the grid from the pits under instructions of a marshal who is positioned at the pitlane exit. These riders are not allowed to have any tyre warmers on and cannot change wheels after the display of the "3 minutes" board.
- In case of two or more riders starting from the back of the grid, they will line up in the order of which they qualified during the Saturday qualification.
- It's forbidden to communicate anything between a moving motorcycle and anyone who is connected to the motorcycle's rider. Exceptions are made for the signal from the timekeeping transponder, the on-board camera's or the voice communication between the rider and team.
- All teams will from this season onwards compete for a MotoGP Team Championship and all teams will be consisting out of two riders. The names of the teams will consist out of multiple elements. The first one is the name of the manufacturers of the motorcycle or engines, which is mandatory. The second one is the name of the team, which is mandatory except when the team name is the same as the manufacturer name. The third is the name of the main sponsor, which is optional. All the points which are scored by both riders in the team, including the substitute or replacement riders, will count towards the team's constructors championship. If the team consists out of only one rider, the points by said rider will also count. An exception is made for wild card entries, which do not score any points.
- In case of an entry, a rider is considered to have taken part the race weekend if he has, at least, participated in one practice session. A rider is considered to have started a race if he, at least, participates in the first lap.
- For a rider to be classified as a finisher of the race and be included in the final results, he must cross the finish line on the circuit and not in the pitlane within five minutes of the race winner. The rider must, at all times, be in contact with his motorcycle also.
- The white line which indicates the pole position must be painted one meter before the start/finish line.
- From 1 January 2003 onwards, races which have changes in the climate because of rain or mixed conditions and have thus changes in adhesion of the circuit, will no longer be stopped.

=== Technical regulations ===
- The 500cc two-stroke machines - in use since the late 1970s - are going to be phased out this season for the new 990cc four-stroke machines.
- Helmets must now conform to one of the recognized international standards and be of the full face type. The European standards are ECE 22-04 & ECE 22-05 'p', the British standards are BS 6658 Grade A and the American standards are USA: DOT Federal Standard n? 218/SNELL M95 & M2000.
- The use of materials has been restricted. The basic structure of the crankshaft and camshafts must be created from either steel or cast iron. It is not allowed to use composite structures which use either carbon or aramid fiber reinforcing material on components such as pistons, cylinder heads and cylinder blocks. It is mandatory to have brake calipers which are made from aluminium material with a modulus of elasticity that does not exceed the 80 GPA. None of the parts on the bike can be made from metallic materials which have a specific elasticity modus that is greater than 50 GPA.

== 2002 Grand Prix season results ==
Round	Date	Grand Prix	Circuit	125cc winner	250cc winner	MotoGP winner	Report
1	7 April	(Japan) Japanese motorcycle Grand Prix	Suzuka	(France) Arnaud Vincent	(Japan) Osamu Miyazaki	(Italy) Valentino Rossi	Report
2	21 April	(South Africa) South African motorcycle Grand Prix	Phakisa	(San Marino) Manuel Poggiali	(Italy) Marco Melandri	(Japan) Tohru Ukawa	Report
3	5 May	(Spain) Spanish motorcycle Grand Prix	Jerez	(Italy) Lucio Cecchinello	(Spain) Fonsi Nieto	(Italy) Valentino Rossi	Report
4	19 May	(France) French motorcycle Grand Prix	Le Mans	(Italy) Lucio Cecchinello	(Spain) Fonsi Nieto	(Italy) Valentino Rossi	Report
5	2 June	(Italy) Italian motorcycle Grand Prix	Mugello	(San Marino) Manuel Poggiali	(Italy) Marco Melandri	(Italy) Valentino Rossi	Report
6	16 June	(Catalonia) Catalan motorcycle Grand Prix	Catalunya	(San Marino) Manuel Poggiali	(Italy) Marco Melandri	(Italy) Valentino Rossi	Report
7	29 June ††	(Netherlands) Dutch TT	Assen	(Spain) Daniel Pedrosa	(Italy) Marco Melandri	(Italy) Valentino Rossi	Report
8	14 July	(United Kingdom) British motorcycle Grand Prix	Donington	(France) Arnaud Vincent	(Italy) Marco Melandri	(Italy) Valentino Rossi	Report
9	21 July	(Germany) German motorcycle Grand Prix	Sachsenring	(France) Arnaud Vincent	(Italy) Marco Melandri	(Italy) Valentino Rossi	Report
10	25 August	Czech Republic motorcycle Grand Prix	Brno	(Italy) Lucio Cecchinello	(Italy) Marco Melandri	(Italy) Max Biaggi	Report
11	8 September	(Portugal) Portuguese motorcycle Grand Prix	Estoril	(France) Arnaud Vincent	(Spain) Fonsi Nieto	(Italy) Valentino Rossi	Report
12	21 September ††	(Rio de Janeiro (state)) Rio de Janeiro motorcycle Grand Prix	Rio de Janeiro	(Japan) Masao Azuma	(Argentina) Sebastián Porto	(Italy) Valentino Rossi	Report
13	6 October	(Tochigi Prefecture) Pacific motorcycle Grand Prix	Motegi	(Spain) Daniel Pedrosa	(Spain) Toni Elías	(Brazil) Alex Barros	Report
14	13 October	(Malaysia) Malaysian motorcycle Grand Prix	Sepang	(France) Arnaud Vincent	(Spain) Fonsi Nieto	(Italy) Max Biaggi	Report
15	20 October	(Australia) Australian motorcycle Grand Prix	Phillip Island	(San Marino) Manuel Poggiali	(Italy) Marco Melandri	(Italy) Valentino Rossi	Report
16	3 November	Valencian Community motorcycle Grand Prix	Valencia	(Spain) Daniel Pedrosa	(Italy) Marco Melandri	(Brazil) Alex Barros	Report

†† = Saturday Race

== Participants ==
=== MotoGP participants ===
FIM released a 20-rider entry list on 13 March 2002. Àlex Crivillé, who was listed on the entry list, was replaced by Pere Riba at the Antena 3 Yamaha d'Antín team before the start of the season. For 2002 Michelin was joined by Bridgestone and Dunlop as tire manufacturers, beginning a six-year tyre war.

Team	Constructor	Motorcycle	Tyres	No.	Rider	Rounds
(Italy) MS Aprilia Racing	Aprilia	RS Cube	D	55	(France) Régis Laconi	All
(Japan) Repsol Honda Team	Honda	RC211V	M	11	(Japan) Tohru Ukawa	All
(Japan) Repsol Honda Team	Honda	RC211V	M	46	(Italy) Valentino Rossi	All
(Japan) Team HRC	Honda	RC211V	M	72	(Japan) Shinichi Ito	1
(Spain) West Honda Pons	Honda	RC211V	M	4	(Brazil) Alex Barros	13–16
(Spain) West Honda Pons	Honda	NSR500	M	4	(Brazil) Alex Barros	1–12
(Spain) West Honda Pons	Honda	NSR500	M	65	(Italy) Loris Capirossi	1–7, 10–16
(Spain) West Honda Pons	Honda	NSR500	M	66	(Germany) Alex Hofmann	8–9
(Italy) Fortuna Honda Gresini	Honda	NSR500	M	74	(Japan) Daijiro Kato	1–9
(Italy) Fortuna Honda Gresini	Honda	RC211V	M	74	(Japan) Daijiro Kato	10–16
(Italy) Pramac Honda Racing Team	Honda	NSR500	D	31	(Japan) Tetsuya Harada	All
(Japan) Kanemoto Racing	Honda	NSR500	B	17	(Netherlands) Jurgen van den Goorbergh	All
(Japan) Kanemoto Racing	Honda	NSR500	B	72	(Japan) Shinichi Ito	15
(Japan) Kawasaki Racing Team	Kawasaki	Ninja ZX-RR	D	48	(Japan) Akira Yanagawa	13
(Japan) Kawasaki Racing Team	Kawasaki	Ninja ZX-RR	D	84	(Australia) Andrew Pitt	14–16
(Malaysia) / (United States) Proton Team KR	Proton KR	KR3	B	9	(Japan) Nobuatsu Aoki	All
(Malaysia) / (United States) Proton Team KR	Proton KR	KR3	B	99	(United Kingdom) Jeremy McWilliams	All
(Malaysia) / (United States) Proton Team KR	Proton KR	KR3	B	29	(Spain) David García	16
(Japan) Telefónica Movistar Suzuki	Suzuki	GSV-R	D	10	(United States) Kenny Roberts Jr.	1–2
(Japan) Telefónica Movistar Suzuki	Suzuki	GSV-R	M	10	(United States) Kenny Roberts Jr.	3–8, 10–16
(Japan) Telefónica Movistar Suzuki	Suzuki	GSV-R	M	51	(Japan) Yukio Kagayama	9
(Japan) Telefónica Movistar Suzuki	Suzuki	GSV-R	M	15	(Spain) Sete Gibernau	3–16
(Japan) Telefónica Movistar Suzuki	Suzuki	GSV-R	D	15	(Spain) Sete Gibernau	1–2
(Japan) Telefónica Movistar Suzuki (Japan) Team Suzuki	Suzuki	GSV-R	D	33	(Japan) Akira Ryō	1
(Japan) Telefónica Movistar Suzuki (Japan) Team Suzuki	Suzuki	GSV-R	M	33	(Japan) Akira Ryō	6–10, 14
(Japan) Marlboro Yamaha Team	Yamaha	YZR-M1	M	3	(Italy) Max Biaggi	All
(Japan) Marlboro Yamaha Team	Yamaha	YZR-M1	M	7	(Spain) Carlos Checa	All
(Japan) Yamaha Racing Team	Yamaha	YZR-M1	M	45	(Japan) Wataru Yoshikawa	13
(France) Gauloises Yamaha Tech 3	Yamaha	YZR-M1	M	19	(France) Olivier Jacque	14–16
(France) Gauloises Yamaha Tech 3	Yamaha	YZR-M1	M	56	(Japan) Shinya Nakano	14–16
(France) Gauloises Yamaha Tech 3	Yamaha	YZR500	M	19	(France) Olivier Jacque	1–13
(France) Gauloises Yamaha Tech 3	Yamaha	YZR500	M	56	(Japan) Shinya Nakano	1–13
(France) Yamaha Tech 3	Yamaha	YZR500	M	50	(France) Sylvain Guintoli	10
(Spain) Antena 3 Yamaha d'Antín	Yamaha	YZR-M1	M	6	(Japan) Norifumi Abe	15–16
(Spain) Antena 3 Yamaha d'Antín	Yamaha	YZR500	M	6	(Japan) Norifumi Abe	1–14
(Spain) Antena 3 Yamaha d'Antín	Yamaha	YZR500	M	20	(Spain) Pere Riba	1–3, 5–8, 10–11, 13
(Spain) Antena 3 Yamaha d'Antín	Yamaha	YZR500	M	30	(Spain) José Luis Cardoso	4, 9, 12, 14–16
(United Kingdom) Red Bull Yamaha WCM	Yamaha	YZR500	D	8	(Australia) Garry McCoy	1–3, 8–16
(United Kingdom) Red Bull Yamaha WCM	Yamaha	YZR500	D	18	(France) Jean-Michel Bayle	4–5
(United Kingdom) Red Bull Yamaha WCM	Yamaha	YZR500	D	66	(Germany) Alex Hofmann	6–7
(United Kingdom) Red Bull Yamaha WCM	Yamaha	YZR500	D	21	(United States) John Hopkins	All

Key
Regular rider
Wildcard rider
Replacement rider

=== 250cc participants ===
The FIM released a 25-rider entry list on 13 March 2002. Alex Hofmann, who was listed on the entry list, withdrew before the start of the season.

Team	Constructor	Motorcycle	Tyres	No.	Rider	Rounds
MS Aprilia Racing	Aprilia	Aprilia RSV 250	D	3	(Italy) Marco Melandri	All
Fortuna Honda Gresini	Honda	Honda NSR250	D	4	(Italy) Roberto Rolfo	All
Fortuna Honda Gresini	Honda	Honda NSR250	D	7	(Spain) Emilio Alzamora	1–9, 11–16
Fortuna Honda Gresini	Honda	Honda NSR250	D	84	(Spain) David García	10
Campetella Racing	Aprilia	Aprilia RSV 250	D	6	(Spain) Alex Debón	All
Campetella Racing	Aprilia	Aprilia RSV 250	D	17	(France) Randy de Puniet	All
Dark Dog Yamaha Kurz	Yamaha	Yamaha YZR 250	D	8	(Japan) Naoki Matsudo	All
Dark Dog Yamaha Kurz	Yamaha	Yamaha YZR 250	D	76	(Japan) Taro Sekiguchi	1–9
Dark Dog Yamaha Kurz	Yamaha	Yamaha YZR 250	D	13	(Czech Republic) Jaroslav Huleš	10–16
Petronas Sprinta Yamaha TVK	Yamaha	Yamaha YZR 250	D	9	(Argentina) Sebastián Porto	All
Petronas Sprinta Yamaha TVK	Yamaha	Yamaha YZR 250	D	18	(Malaysia) Shahrol Yuzy	All
Telefónica Movistar – Repsol YPF	Aprilia	Aprilia RSV 250	D	10	(Spain) Fonsi Nieto	All
Telefónica Movistar – Repsol YPF	Aprilia	Aprilia RSV 250	D	24	(Spain) Toni Elías	All
DeGraaf Grand Prix Team	Honda	Honda NSR250	D	11	(Japan) Haruchika Aoki	All
DeGraaf Grand Prix Team	Honda	Honda NSR250	D	41	(Netherlands) Jarno Janssen	1–9
DeGraaf Grand Prix Team	Honda	Honda NSR250	D	29	(Netherlands) Henk van de Lagemaat	10
DeGraaf Grand Prix Team	Honda	Honda NSR250	D	30	(Netherlands) Rob Filart	11
DeGraaf Grand Prix Team	Honda	Honda NSR250	D	96	(Czech Republic) Jakub Smrž	12–16
Cibertel Honda BQR	Honda	Honda RS250R	D	12	(United Kingdom) Jay Vincent	All
Cibertel Honda BQR	Honda	Honda RS250R	D	19	(United Kingdom) Leon Haslam	All
Cibertel Honda BQR	Honda	Honda RS250R	D	34	(Andorra) Eric Bataille	3, 6, 11–12, 16
Motoracing / TU Racing Team	Aprilia	Aprilia RSV 250	D	15	(Italy) Roberto Locatelli	All
Imola Circuit Exalt Cycle Race	Aprilia	Aprilia RSV 250	D	21	(Italy) Franco Battaini	All
RFME Equipo Nacional	Aprilia	Aprilia RSV 250	D	22	(Spain) Raúl Jara	All
RFME Equipo Nacional	Aprilia	Aprilia RSV 250	D	32	(Spain) Héctor Faubel	All
Equipe de France – Scrab GP	Aprilia	Aprilia RSV 250	D	25	(France) Vincent Philippe	1–9
Equipe de France – Scrab GP	Aprilia	Aprilia RSV 250	D	36	(France) Erwan Nigon	10–16
Equipe de France – Scrab GP	Aprilia	Aprilia RSV 250	D	51	(France) Hugo Marchand	1–10, 12–16
Equipe de France – Scrab GP	Aprilia	Aprilia RSV 250	D	57	(France) Grégory Lefort	11
Safilo Oxydo Race LCR	Aprilia	Aprilia RSV 250	D	27	(Australia) Casey Stoner	All
Safilo Oxydo Race LCR	Aprilia	Aprilia RSV 250	D	42	(Spain) David Checa	All
Aprilia Germany	Aprilia	Aprilia RSV 250	D	28	(Germany) Dirk Heidolf	All
UGT 3000 – Abruzzo	Aprilia	Aprilia RSV 250	D	26	(Germany) Ralf Waldmann	7, 9–10
Ipone Tecmas Racing	Aprilia	Aprilia RSV 250	D	35	(France) Thierry van den Bosch	4
Ipone Tecmas Racing	Aprilia	Aprilia RSV 250	D	77	(France) Thierry van den Bosch	7, 9
Edf Espoir	Honda	Honda RS250R	D	36	(France) Erwan Nigon	4
Aspi	Honda	Honda RS250R	D	37	(France) Yann Lussiana	4
Cordoba Patrimonio Hum.	Yamaha	Yamaha YZR 250	D	39	(Spain) Luis Castro	3, 16
Faster by Fuller Racing	Honda	Honda RS250R	D	43	(United Kingdom) Christopher Sansome	8
Faster by Fuller Racing	Aprilia	Aprilia RSV 250	D	44	(United Kingdom) Andrew Whittley	8
Team Racer Bike	Honda	Honda RS250R	D	45	(France) Samuel Aubry	4
RM Racing	Honda	Honda RS250R	D	47	(United Kingdom) Jason Boyce	8
Team Kotake RSC	Honda	Honda RS250R	D	48	(Japan) Shinichi Nakatomi	1
Burning Blood R.T.	Honda	Honda RS250R	D	49	(Japan) Chojun Kameya	1
Endurance	Honda	Honda NSR250	D	50	(Japan) Daisaku Sakai	1
Kiefer Castrol Honda	Honda	Honda RS250R	D	52	(Germany) Christian Gemmel	9
Neukirchner Racing Team	Honda	Honda RS250R	D	53	(Germany) Max Neukirchner	9
Kehrer Racing Team	Honda	Honda RS250R	D	54	(Germany) Nico Kehrer	9
MRTT – Hugen Racing	Honda	Honda RS250R	D	58	(Netherlands) Jan Blok	7
MRTT – Hugen Racing	Honda	Honda RS250R	D	59	(Netherlands) Peter Politiek	7
Sierhekwerk W v/d Pol	Aprilia	Aprilia RSV 250	D	60	(Netherlands) Gert Pieper	7
Jovink Raps	Aprilia	Aprilia RSV 250	D	61	(Netherlands) Jarno Boesveld	7
Klub Racing Team Znojmo	Honda	Honda RS250R	D	62	(Czech Republic) Radomil Rous	10
Bird Racing Team	Honda	Honda RS250R	D	63	(Hungary) Gábor Rizmayer	10
Slovnaft Yamaha Racing Team	Yamaha	Yamaha YZR 250	D	64	(Slovakia) Vladimir Častka	10
Heierli Racing Pvm Team	Honda	Honda RS250R	D	65	(Switzerland) Roger Heierli	10
Hitman RC Koshien	Yamaha	Yamaha YZR 250	D	68	(Japan) Tekkyu Kayo	13
SP Tadao Racing Team	Yamaha	Yamaha YZR 250	D	69	(Japan) Nobuyuki Osaki	13
Morinokumasan Miztec RT	Yamaha	Yamaha YZR 250	D	70	(Japan) Ryuji Yokoe	13
Technospeed Nakasuga	Yamaha	Yamaha YZR 250	D	71	(Japan) Katsuyuki Nakasuga	13
Team HRC	Honda	Honda NSR250	D	72	(Japan) Yuki Takahashi	13
Racing Damas	Aprilia	Aprilia RSV 250	D	74	(Spain) Ángel Rodríguez	16
EMS Racing	Honda	Honda RS250R	D	78	(Australia) Peter Taplin	15
RGV Spares	Yamaha	Yamaha YZR 250	D	79	(Australia) Russell Holland	15
Impact Racing	Yamaha	Yamaha YZR 250	D	80	(Australia) Earl Lynch	15
STU Avant – Msr – Elf	Honda	Honda RS250R	D	81	(Australia) Mark Stanley	15
Motorex Daytona	Yamaha	Yamaha YZR 250	D	89	(Japan) Osamu Miyazaki	1
Team Stargel Aprilia	Aprilia	Aprilia RSV 250	D	90	(United States) Chuck Sorensen	16
Team Harc-Pro	Honda	Honda RS250R	D	92	(Japan) Hiroshi Aoyama	1, 13
Ferro Moto Sport	Aprilia	Aprilia RSV 250	D	93	(France) Hervé Mora	4

Key
Regular rider
Wildcard rider
Replacement rider

=== 125cc participants ===
FIM released a 33-rider entry list on 13 March 2002.

Team	Constructor	Motorcycle	Tyres	No.	Rider	Rounds
Gilera Racing	Gilera	Gilera 125 GP	D	1	(San Marino) Manuel Poggiali	All
Safilo Oxydo Race LCR	Aprilia	Aprilia RS125R	D	4	(Italy) Lucio Cecchinello	All
Safilo Oxydo Race LCR	Aprilia	Aprilia RS125R	D	15	(San Marino) Alex de Angelis	All
Tribe by Breil	Honda	Honda RS125R	B	5	(Japan) Masao Azuma	All
Scot Racing Team	Honda	Honda RS125R	D	6	(Italy) Mirko Giansanti	All
Scot Racing Team	Honda	Honda RS125R	D	34	(Italy) Andrea Dovizioso	All
Italjet Racing Service	Italjet	Italjet F125	B	7	(Italy) Stefano Perugini	All
Italjet Racing Service	Italjet	Italjet F125	B	24	(United Kingdom) Leon Camier	6–8
Italjet Racing Service	Italjet	Italjet F125	B	42	(Italy) Christian Pistoni	9–16
Italjet Racing Service	Italjet	Italjet F125	D	8	(Hungary) Gábor Talmácsi	1–5
PEV Moto ADAC Sachsen	Honda	Honda RS125R	B	10	(Germany) Jarno Müller	1–3
PEV Moto ADAC Sachsen	Honda	Honda RS125R	B	30	(Italy) Gaspare Caffiero	5
PEV Moto ADAC Sachsen	Honda	Honda RS125R	B	8	(Hungary) Gábor Talmácsi	7–16
PEV Moto ADAC Sachsen	Honda	Honda RS125R	B	12	(Germany) Klaus Nöhles	1–5, 9–16
PEV Moto ADAC Sachsen	Honda	Honda RS125R	B	66	(Japan) Shuhei Aoyama	7–8
Semprucci Angaia Racing	Honda	Honda RS125R	D	9	(Japan) Noboru Ueda	1–5, 11–16
Semprucci Angaia Racing	Honda	Honda RS125R	D	44	(Italy) Alessandro Brannetti	6
Semprucci Angaia Racing	Honda	Honda RS125R	D	75	(Italy) Fabrizio Lai	7–8
Semprucci Angaia Racing	Honda	Honda RS125R	D	76	(Czech Republic) Matej Smrž	9
Semprucci Angaia Racing	Honda	Honda RS125R	D	72	(Germany) Dario Giuseppetti	10
Semprucci Angaia Racing	Honda	Honda RS125R	D	20	(Hungary) Imre Tóth	All
Semprucci Angaia Racing	Honda	Honda RS125R	D	76	(Czech Republic) Matej Smrž	10
Motoracing / TU Racing Team	Aprilia	Aprilia RS125R	D	11	(Italy) Max Sabbatani	13–16
Motoracing / TU Racing Team	Aprilia	Aprilia RS125R	D	16	(Italy) Simone Sanna	All
Bossini Sterilgarda Racing	Aprilia	Aprilia RS125R	D	11	(Italy) Max Sabbatani	1–5, 8–11
Bossini Sterilgarda Racing	Aprilia	Aprilia RS125R	D	32	(Italy) Gianluigi Scalvini	6–7
Bossini Sterilgarda Racing	Aprilia	Aprilia RS125R	D	33	(Italy) Stefano Bianco	1–8, 10–16
Bossini Sterilgarda Racing	Aprilia	Aprilia RS125R	B	50	(Italy) Andrea Ballerini	12–16
UGT 3000 – Abruzzo	Aprilia	Aprilia RS125R	D	17	(Germany) Steve Jenkner	All
UGT 3000 – Abruzzo	Aprilia	Aprilia RS125R	D	19	(Italy) Alex Baldolini	All
UGT 3000 – Abruzzo	Aprilia	Aprilia RS125R	D	23	(Italy) Gino Borsoi	All
Elit Grand Prix	Honda	Honda RS125R	D	18	(Czech Republic) Jakub Smrž	1–7
Elit Grand Prix	Honda	Honda RS125R	B	77	(Switzerland) Thomas Lüthi	9–12, 14–16
Elit Grand Prix	Honda	Honda RS125R	B	97	(Japan) Hideyuki Nakajo	13
Imola Circuit Exalt Cycle Race	Aprilia	Aprilia RS125R	D	21	(France) Arnaud Vincent	All
Master – Aspar Team	Aprilia	Aprilia RS125R	D	22	(Spain) Pablo Nieto	All
Master – Aspar Team	Aprilia	Aprilia RS125R	D	47	(Spain) Ángel Rodríguez	1–9
Master – Aspar Team	Aprilia	Aprilia RS125R	D	80	(Spain) Héctor Barberá	All
Telefónica Movistar jnr Team	Honda	Honda RS125R	D	25	(Spain) Joan Olivé	All
Telefónica Movistar jnr Team	Honda	Honda RS125R	D	26	(Spain) Dani Pedrosa	All
Telefónica Movistar jnr Team	Honda	Honda RS125R	D	52	(Spain) Julián Simón	3, 6, 11, 16
CWF – Matteoni Racing	Aprilia	Aprilia RS125R	D	39	(Czech Republic) Jaroslav Huleš	1–7
CWF – Matteoni Racing	Aprilia	Aprilia RS125R	D	28	(Italy) Ivan Goi	8–9
CWF – Matteoni Racing	Aprilia	Aprilia RS125R	D	37	(Italy) Marco Simoncelli	10–12, 14–16
CWF – Matteoni Racing	Aprilia	Aprilia RS125R	D	57	(United Kingdom) Chaz Davies	All
Team Italia	Gilera	Gilera 125 GP	D	31	(Italy) Mattia Angeloni	All
Team Italia	Gilera	Gilera 125 GP	D	84	(Italy) Michel Fabrizio	All
Red Devil Honda	Honda	Honda RS125R	D	36	(Finland) Mika Kallio	All
Red Devil Honda	Honda	Honda RS125R	D	88	(Denmark) Robbin Harms	10
Caja Madrid Derbi Racing	Derbi	Derbi 125 GP	D	41	(Japan) Youichi Ui	All
Caja Madrid Derbi Racing	Derbi	Derbi 125 GP	D	48	(Spain) Jorge Lorenzo	3–16
Sutthisam Vaewsamana	Honda	Honda RS125R	D	46	(Thailand) Suhathai Chaemsap	1
OMV Team Hanusch	Honda	Honda RS125R	D	49	(Czech Republic) Igor Kalab	10
FCC – TSR	Honda	Honda RS125R	B	50	(Italy) Andrea Ballerini	1–11
FCC – TSR	Honda	Honda RS125R	B	72	(Germany) Dario Giuseppetti	12–16
FCC – TSR	Honda	Honda RS125R	B	83	(Australia) Josh Waters	14–15
Atletico de Madrid	Aprilia	Aprilia RS125R	B	51	(Spain) Álvaro Bautista	3, 6, 16
Team Gabrielli	Aprilia	Aprilia RS125R	D	53	(Italy) Gioele Pellino	5, 10
RCGM – Rubincone Corse	Aprilia	Aprilia RS125R	D	54	(Italy) Marco Petrini	5
Team Machado	Honda	Honda RS125R	D	55	(Spain) Javier Machado	6
Kart Centrum	Honda	Honda RS125R	D	56	(Czech Republic) Lukáš Pešek	10
Team Technimoto Cavaillon	Honda	Honda RS125R	D	58	(France) Yohann Tiberio	4
Team Philippe Coulon	Honda	Honda RS125R	D	59	(Switzerland) Vincent Braillard	4, 16
MG Parts – RG Racing Team	Honda	Honda RS125R	D	60	(Netherlands) Randy Gevers	7
De Graaf Junior Team	Honda	Honda RS125R	D	61	(Netherlands) Raymond Schouten	7
Roteg Racing	Honda	Honda RS125R	B	62	(Netherlands) Gerald Perdon	7
Racing Moto Sport	Honda	Honda RS125R	D	63	(France) Jimmy Petit	4
Holmes Earth Moving	Honda	Honda RS125R	D	64	(Australia) Peter Holmes	15
Honda Kumamoto Racing	Honda	Honda RS125R	D	65	(Japan) Toshihisa Kuzuhara	1, 13
Showa Denki	Honda	Honda RS125R	D	66	(Japan) Shuhei Aoyama	1, 13
Team Plus One	Honda	Honda RS125R	D	67	(Japan) Hideyuki Ogata	1, 13
Dinky Racing	Honda	Honda RS125R	D	68	(Japan) Akira Komuro	1, 13
UK Racing	Honda	Honda RS125R	D	69	(United Kingdom) Christian Elkin	8
Wilson Racing	Honda	Honda RS125R	B	70	(United Kingdom) Chris Martin	8
MIR Racing	Aprilia	Aprilia RS125R	B	71	(Spain) Ruben Catalan	3, 16
Giuseppetti Viba Team	Honda	Honda RS125R	D	72	(Germany) Dario Giuseppetti	9
Kiefer Castrol Honda	Honda	Honda RS125R	D	73	(Germany) Claudius Klein	9
RPS Racing Saalfeld	Honda	Honda RS125R	D	74	(Germany) Jascha Büsch	9
TZM Racing Team	Honda	Honda RS125R	D	78	(Portugal) Pedro Monteiro	11
International Racing Team	Honda	Honda RS125R	D	79	(Portugal) João Pinto	11
CMSA Protectaprint	Honda	Honda RS125R	D	81	(Australia) Tim Inkster	15
Ruffnuts/Gulf Western	Honda	Honda RS125R	D	82	(Australia) Jeremy Crowe	15
RMS	Honda	Honda RS125R	D	85	(France) Gregory Leblanc	4
Provence Motor Sport	Aprilia	Aprilia RS125R	D	86	(France) Gregory Lefort	4
Polini	Honda	Honda RS125R	D	87	(Italy) Simone Corsi	5
DB Racing Team	Honda	Honda RS125R	D	89	(Netherlands) Adri den Bekker	7
Red Bull Rookies	Honda	Honda RS125R	D	90	(United Kingdom) Guy Farbrother	8
Red Bull Rookies	Honda	Honda RS125R	D	91	(New Zealand) Midge Smart	8
ADAC Sashsen Motorrad Unger	Honda	Honda RS125R	D	92	(Germany) Patrick Unger	9
ADAC Sachsen	Honda	Honda RS125R	D	93	(Germany) Manuel Mickan	9
Sergi Motos	Yamaha	Yamaha TZ125	D	94	(Portugal) Filipe Costa	11
Team Harc-Pro	Honda	Honda RS125R	D	95	(Japan) Takashi Yasuda	13
Bikecards.com	Honda	Honda RS125R	D	98	(Canada) Chris Peris	16

Key
Regular rider
Wildcard rider
Replacement rider

== Standings ==
=== MotoGP standings ===
Scoring system

Points were awarded to the top fifteen finishers. A rider had to finish the race to earn points.

Position	**1st**	**2nd**	**3rd**	**4th**	**5th**	**6th**	**7th**	**8th**	**9th**	**10th**	**11th**	**12th**	**13th**	**14th**	**15th**
Points	25	20	16	13	11	10	9	8	7	6	5	4	3	2	1

==== Riders' standings ====
- Rounds marked with a light blue background were under wet race conditions or stopped by rain.
- Riders marked with light blue background were eligible for Rookie of the Year awards.

Pos	Rider	Bike	Team	JPN (Japan)	RSA (South Africa)	SPA (Spain)	FRA (France)	ITA (Italy)	CAT (Catalonia)	NED (Netherlands)	GBR (United Kingdom)	GER (Germany)	CZE (Czech Republic)	POR (Portugal)	RIO (Rio de Janeiro (state))	PAC (Tochigi Prefecture)	MAL (Malaysia)	AUS (Australia)	VAL (Valencian Community)	Pts
1	(Italy) Valentino Rossi	Honda	Repsol Honda Team	**1**	**2**	**1**	**1**	**1**	1	**1**	**1**	1	Ret	1	1	2	2	1	2	355
2	(Italy) Max Biaggi	Yamaha	Marlboro Yamaha Team	Ret	9	DSQ	3	2	**4**	4	2	2	**1**	6	**2**	Ret	1	6	**3**	215
3	(Japan) Tohru Ukawa	Honda	Repsol Honda Team	Ret	1	3	2	3	2	5	WD	3	3	3	Ret	4	4	3	5	209
4	(Brazil) Alex Barros	Honda	West Honda Pons	6	Ret	5	8	5	5	2	3	Ret	9	5	4	1	**3**	2	1	204
5	(Spain) Carlos Checa	Yamaha	Marlboro Yamaha Team	3	5	Ret	Ret	4	3	3	Ret	4	5	**2**	Ret	5	7	11	Ret	141
6	(Japan) Norifumi Abe	Yamaha	Antena 3 Yamaha d'Antín	5	7	6	4	7	16	9	4	6	8	7	6	8	10	DNS	10	129
7	(Japan) Daijiro Kato	Honda	Fortuna Honda Gresini	10	4	2	Ret	Ret	8	12	7	Ret	2	Ret	Ret	**Ret**	5	4	4	117
8	(Italy) Loris Capirossi	Honda	West Honda Pons	9	3	4	7	6	6	Ret			6	Ret	5	3	9	Ret	Ret	109
9	(United States) Kenny Roberts Jr.	Suzuki	Telefónica Movistar Suzuki	Ret	Ret	8	5	Ret	7	6	14		11	4	3	6	8	9	Ret	99
10	(France) Olivier Jacque	Yamaha	Gauloises Yamaha Tech 3	Ret	6	11	Ret	9	9	14	5	**Ret**	10	Ret	7	7	Ret	8	9	81
11	(Japan) Shinya Nakano	Yamaha	Gauloises Yamaha Tech 3	Ret	8	17	13	11	Ret	8	10	5	Ret	12	Ret	16	6	13	6	68
12	(Japan) Nobuatsu Aoki	Proton KR	Proton Team KR	7	Ret	7	6	Ret	Ret	Ret	9	8	Ret	Ret	12	9	Ret	7	Ret	63
13	(Netherlands) Jurgen van den Goorbergh	Honda	Kanemoto Racing	Ret	11	12	15	14	Ret	10	15	12	12	Ret	9	13	13	5	7	60
14	(United Kingdom) Jeremy McWilliams	Proton KR	Proton Team KR	Ret	Ret	16	10	Ret	12	Ret	Ret	7	7	9	Ret	10	12	**10**	8	59
15	(United States) John Hopkins	Yamaha	Red Bull Yamaha WCM	12	14	13	11	12	10	7	8	DNS	Ret	8	14	14	18	16	11	58
16	(Spain) Sete Gibernau	Suzuki	Telefónica Movistar Suzuki	Ret	16	9	12	Ret	Ret	Ret	6	Ret	4	Ret	8	Ret	14	12	13	51
17	(Japan) Tetsuya Harada	Honda	Pramac Honda Racing Team	11	12	10	Ret	10	13	13	11	Ret	15	10	13	15	Ret	14	14	47
18	(Japan) Akira Ryō	Suzuki	Team Suzuki	2					11	15	13	11	14				11			41
19	(France) Régis Laconi	Aprilia	MS Aprilia Racing	8	15	14	9	8	14	Ret	16	Ret	16	Ret	Ret	11	17	Ret	Ret	33
20	(Australia) Garry McCoy	Yamaha	Red Bull Yamaha WCM	Ret	10	15					12	9	13	11	10	17	15	18	Ret	33
21	(Japan) Shinichi Ito	Honda	Team HRC	4																13
21	(Japan) Shinichi Ito	Honda	Kanemoto Racing															Ret		13
22	(Germany) Alex Hofmann	Yamaha	Red Bull Yamaha WCM						Ret	11										11
22	(Germany) Alex Hofmann	Honda	West Honda Pons								17	10								11
23	(Spain) José Luis Cardoso	Yamaha	Antena 3 Yamaha d'Antín				16					13			11		16	15	Ret	9
24	(France) Jean-Michel Bayle	Yamaha	Red Bull Yamaha WCM				14	13												5
25	(Japan) Wataru Yoshikawa	Yamaha	Yamaha Racing Team													12				4
26	(Australia) Andrew Pitt	Kawasaki	Kawasaki Racing Team														19	17	12	4
27	(Spain) Pere Riba	Yamaha	Antena 3 Yamaha d'Antín	DNQ	13	Ret		Ret	15	Ret	DNS		DNS	Ret		DNS				4
	(France) Sylvain Guintoli	Yamaha	Yamaha Tech 3										17							0
	(Japan) Yukio Kagayama	Suzuki	Telefónica Movistar Suzuki									Ret								0
	(Japan) Akira Yanagawa	Kawasaki	Kawasaki Racing Team													Ret				0
	(Spain) David García	Proton KR	Proton Team KR																Ret	0
Pos	Rider	Bike	Team	JPN (Japan)	RSA (South Africa)	SPA (Spain)	FRA (France)	ITA (Italy)	CAT (Catalonia)	NED (Netherlands)	GBR (United Kingdom)	GER (Germany)	CZE (Czech Republic)	POR (Portugal)	RIO (Rio de Janeiro (state))	PAC (Tochigi Prefecture)	MAL (Malaysia)	AUS (Australia)	VAL (Valencian Community)	Pts

Colour	Result
Gold	Winner
Silver	Second place
Bronze	Third place
Green	Points classification
Blue	Non-points classification
Blue	Non-classified finish (NC)
Purple	Retired, not classified (Ret)
Red	Did not qualify (DNQ)
Red	Did not pre-qualify (DNPQ)
Black	Disqualified (DSQ)
White	Did not start (DNS)
White	Withdrew (WD)
White	Race cancelled (C)
Blank	Did not practice (DNP)
Blank	Did not arrive (DNA)
Blank	Excluded (EX)

**Bold** – Pole position
Italics – Fastest lap

==== Constructors' standings ====
- Each constructor got the same number of points as their best placed rider in each race.
- Rounds marked with a light blue background were under wet race conditions or stopped by rain.

Pos	Constructor	JPN (Japan)	RSA (South Africa)	SPA (Spain)	FRA (France)	ITA (Italy)	CAT (Catalonia)	NED (Netherlands)	GBR (United Kingdom)	GER (Germany)	CZE (Czech Republic)	POR (Portugal)	RIO (Rio de Janeiro (state))	PAC (Tochigi Prefecture)	MAL (Malaysia)	AUS (Australia)	VAL (Valencian Community)	Pts
1	(Japan) Honda	1	1	1	1	1	1	1	1	1	2	1	1	1	2	1	1	390
2	(Japan) Yamaha	3	5	6	3	2	3	3	2	2	1	2	2	5	1	6	3	272
3	(Japan) Suzuki	2	16	8	5	Ret	7	6	6	11	4	4	3	6	8	9	13	143
4	(Malaysia) / (United States) Proton KR	7	Ret	7	6	Ret	12	Ret	9	7	7	9	12	9	12	7	8	96
5	(Italy) Aprilia	8	15	14	9	8	14	Ret	16	Ret	16	Ret	Ret	11	17	Ret	Ret	33
6	(Japan) Kawasaki													Ret	19	17	12	4
Pos	Constructor	JPN (Japan)	RSA (South Africa)	SPA (Spain)	FRA (France)	ITA (Italy)	CAT (Catalonia)	NED (Netherlands)	GBR (United Kingdom)	GER (Germany)	CZE (Czech Republic)	POR (Portugal)	RIO (Rio de Janeiro (state))	PAC (Tochigi Prefecture)	MAL (Malaysia)	AUS (Australia)	VAL (Valencian Community)	Pts

==== Teams' standings ====
- Each team got the total points scored by their two riders, including replacement riders. In one rider team, only the points scored by that rider was counted. Wildcard riders did not score points.
- Rounds marked with a light blue background were under wet race conditions or stopped by rain.

Pos	Team	Bike No.	JPN (Japan)	RSA (South Africa)	SPA (Spain)	FRA (France)	ITA (Italy)	CAT (Catalonia)	NED (Netherlands)	GBR (United Kingdom)	GER (Germany)	CZE (Czech Republic)	POR (Portugal)	RIO (Rio de Janeiro (state))	PAC (Tochigi Prefecture)	MAL (Malaysia)	AUS (Australia)	VAL (Valencian Community)	Pts
1	(Japan) Repsol Honda Team	11	Ret	1	3	2	3	2	5	DNS	3	3	3	Ret	4	4	3	5	564
1	(Japan) Repsol Honda Team	46	**1**	**2**	**1**	**1**	**1**	1	**1**	**1**	1	Ret	1	1	2	2	1	2	564
2	(Japan) Marlboro Yamaha Team	3	Ret	9	DSQ	3	2	**4**	4	2	2	**1**	6	**2**	Ret	1	6	**3**	356
2	(Japan) Marlboro Yamaha Team	7	3	5	Ret	Ret	4	3	3	Ret	4	5	**2**	Ret	5	7	11	Ret	356
3	(Spain) West Honda Pons	4	6	Ret	5	8	5	5	2	3	Ret	9	5	4	1	**3**	2	1	319
3	(Spain) West Honda Pons	65	9	3	4	7	6	6	Ret			6	Ret	5	3	9	Ret	Ret	319
3	(Spain) West Honda Pons	66								17	10								319
4	(Japan) Telefónica Movistar Suzuki	10	Ret	Ret	8	5	Ret	7	6	14		11	4	3	6	8	9	Ret	150
4	(Japan) Telefónica Movistar Suzuki	15	Ret	16	9	12	Ret	Ret	Ret	6	Ret	4	Ret	8	Ret	14	12	13	150
4	(Japan) Telefónica Movistar Suzuki	51									Ret								150
5	(France) Gauloises Yamaha Tech 3	19	Ret	6	11	Ret	9	9	14	5	**Ret**	10	Ret	7	7	Ret	8	9	149
5	(France) Gauloises Yamaha Tech 3	56	Ret	8	17	13	11	Ret	8	10	5	Ret	12	Ret	16	6	13	6	149
6	(Spain) Antena 3 Yamaha d'Antín	6	5	7	6	4	7	16	9	4	6	8	7	6	8	10	DNS	10	142
6	(Spain) Antena 3 Yamaha d'Antín	20	DNS	13	Ret		Ret	15	Ret	DNS		DNS	Ret		DNS				142
6	(Spain) Antena 3 Yamaha d'Antín	30				16					13			11		16	15	Ret	142
7	(Malaysia) / (United States) Proton Team KR	9	7	Ret	7	6	Ret	Ret	Ret	9	8	Ret	Ret	12	9	Ret	7	Ret	122
7	(Malaysia) / (United States) Proton Team KR	99	Ret	Ret	16	10	Ret	12	Ret	Ret	7	7	9	Ret	10	12	**10**	8	122
8	(Italy) Fortuna Honda Gresini	74	10	4	2	Ret	Ret	8	12	7	Ret	2	Ret	Ret	**Ret**	5	4	4	117
9	(United Kingdom) Red Bull Yamaha WCM	8	Ret	10	15					12	9	13	11	10	17	15	18	Ret	101
9	(United Kingdom) Red Bull Yamaha WCM	18				14	13												101
9	(United Kingdom) Red Bull Yamaha WCM	21	12	14	13	11	12	10	7	8	DNS	Ret	8	14	14	18	16	11	101
9	(United Kingdom) Red Bull Yamaha WCM	66						Ret	11										101
10	(Japan) Kanemoto Racing	17	Ret	11	12	15	14	Ret	10	15	12	12	Ret	9	13	13	5	7	60
11	(Italy) Pramac Honda Racing Team	31	11	12	10	Ret	10	13	13	11	Ret	15	10	13	15	Ret	14	14	47
12	(Italy) MS Aprilia Racing	55	8	15	14	9	8	14	Ret	16	Ret	16	Ret	Ret	11	17	Ret	Ret	33
Pos	Team	Bike No.	JPN (Japan)	RSA (South Africa)	SPA (Spain)	FRA (France)	ITA (Italy)	CAT (Catalonia)	NED (Netherlands)	GBR (United Kingdom)	GER (Germany)	CZE (Czech Republic)	POR (Portugal)	RIO (Rio de Janeiro (state))	PAC (Tochigi Prefecture)	MAL (Malaysia)	AUS (Australia)	VAL (Valencian Community)	Pts

=== 250cc standings ===
Scoring system

Points were awarded to the top fifteen finishers. A rider had to finish the race to earn points.

Position	**1st**	**2nd**	**3rd**	**4th**	**5th**	**6th**	**7th**	**8th**	**9th**	**10th**	**11th**	**12th**	**13th**	**14th**	**15th**
Points	25	20	16	13	11	10	9	8	7	6	5	4	3	2	1

==== Riders' standings ====
- Rounds marked with a light blue background were under wet race conditions or stopped by rain.
- Riders marked with light blue background were eligible for Rookie of the Year awards.

Pos	Rider	Bike	JPN (Japan)	RSA (South Africa)	SPA (Spain)	FRA (France)	ITA (Italy)	CAT (Catalonia)	NED (Netherlands)	GBR (United Kingdom)	GER (Germany)	CZE (Czech Republic)	POR (Portugal)	RIO (Rio de Janeiro (state))	PAC (Tochigi Prefecture)	MAL (Malaysia)	AUS (Australia)	VAL (Valencian Community)	Pts
1	(Italy) Marco Melandri	Aprilia	Ret	1	Ret	2	1	1	**1**	1	1	1	2	4	2	Ret	1	**1**	298
2	(Spain) Fonsi Nieto	Aprilia	**13**	3	1	**1**	3	**3**	5	**2**	**4**	**4**	1	Ret	**4**	**1**	**2**	Ret	241
3	(Italy) Roberto Rolfo	Honda	8	4	2	5	8	2	3	5	2	Ret	4	2	6	3	4	2	219
4	(Spain) Toni Elías	Aprilia	11	16	10	6	4	10	2	3	6	3	13	5	1	2	5	10	178
5	(Argentina) Sebastián Porto	Yamaha	5	8	7	8	7	Ret	4	Ret	3	2	**3**	1	8	4	3	Ret	172
6	(Italy) Franco Battaini	Aprilia	10	**2**	**4**	Ret	**6**	5	9	4	8	Ret	Ret	3	7	5	7	7	142
7	(Spain) Emilio Alzamora	Honda	4	7	3	7	11	9	Ret	12	Ret		6	7	5	8	13	3	120
8	(Italy) Roberto Locatelli	Aprilia	16	5	5	4	2	Ret	7	13	5	7	5	Ret	9	13	Ret	5	119
9	(France) Randy de Puniet	Aprilia	3	6	Ret	3	5	4	Ret	6	Ret	6	Ret	**Ret**	Ret	6	6	4	119
10	(Japan) Naoki Matsudo	Yamaha	6	11	9	11	14	7	14	8	7	8	Ret	8	16	7	14	8	92
11	(Spain) Alex Debón	Aprilia	9	9	8	9	Ret	13	12	9	10	13	Ret	Ret	10	Ret	9	9	72
12	(Australia) Casey Stoner	Aprilia	Ret	Ret	6	Ret	DNS	6	8	11	Ret	5	Ret	6	17	11	10	13	68
13	(Spain) David Checa	Aprilia	DNS	10	Ret	10	10	12	16	15	15	18	8	12	21	10	8	6	60
14	(Japan) Haruchika Aoki	Honda	Ret	13	12	Ret	12	11	6	7	Ret	9	Ret	Ret	13	12	11	12	58
15	(Malaysia) Shahrol Yuzy	Yamaha	Ret	Ret	13	13	9	8	10	10	11	Ret	Ret	9	18	9	15	11	58
16	(Japan) Osamu Miyazaki	Yamaha	1																25
17	(Japan) Daisaku Sakai	Honda	2																20
18	(United Kingdom) Leon Haslam	Honda	Ret	15	19	Ret	18	18	Ret	17	13	17	7	10	Ret	17	18	17	19
19	(Germany) Ralf Waldmann	Aprilia							11		9	11							17
20	(Germany) Dirk Heidolf	Aprilia	DNQ	14	Ret	18	Ret	21	20	18	12	14	9	14	20	18	16	19	17
21	(Japan) Yuki Takahashi	Honda													3				16
22	(United Kingdom) Jay Vincent	Honda	Ret	12	17	15	15	19	19	16	14	12	Ret	Ret	19	14	Ret	14	16
23	(Spain) Héctor Faubel	Aprilia	Ret	Ret	11	14	16	20	Ret	20	18	Ret	10	17	22	Ret	19	15	14
24	(Czech Republic) Jaroslav Huleš	Yamaha										Ret	Ret	11	15	15	12	16	11
25	(Spain) Raúl Jara	Aprilia	15	Ret	16	19	17	15	13	Ret	17	15	11	16	Ret	Ret	Ret	Ret	11
26	(Japan) Chojun Kameya	Honda	7																9
27	(Japan) Hiroshi Aoyama	Honda	12												11				9
28	(France) Erwan Nigon	Aprilia										16	12	13	23	Ret	Ret	20	7
28	(France) Erwan Nigon	Honda				20													7
29	(Japan) Taro Sekiguchi	Yamaha	Ret	Ret	15	12	Ret	16	17	14	16								7
30	(Spain) David García	Honda										10							6
31	(Japan) Katsuyuki Nakasuga	Yamaha													12				4
32	(France) Vincent Philippe	Aprilia	Ret	Ret	18	16	13	17	15	Ret	Ret								4
33	(France) Hugo Marchand	Aprilia	14	Ret	Ret	DNQ	Ret	14	Ret	Ret	Ret	Ret		Ret	Ret	19	DNS	Ret	4
34	(Andorra) Eric Bataille	Honda			14			Ret					Ret	Ret				Ret	2
35	(Japan) Ryuji Yokoe	Yamaha													14				2
36	(Czech Republic) Jakub Smrž	Honda												15	24	16	17	Ret	1
	(Netherlands) Jarno Janssen	Honda	Ret	17	20	17	Ret	22	18	19	Ret								0
	(Spain) Ángel Rodríguez	Aprilia																18	0
	(Germany) Max Neukirchner	Honda									19								0
	(Netherlands) Henk van de Lagemaat	Honda										19							0
	(Hungary) Gábor Rizmayer	Honda										20							0
	(Australia) Russell Holland	Yamaha															20		0
	(Netherlands) Peter Politiek	Honda							21										0
	(United Kingdom) Andrew Whittley	Aprilia								21									0
	(United States) Chuck Sorensen	Aprilia																21	0
	(Netherlands) Jarno Boesveld	Aprilia							22										0
	(Netherlands) Gert Pieper	Aprilia							23										0
	(France) Thierry van den Bosch	Honda				Ret			DNQ		Ret								0
	(Japan) Shinichi Nakatomi	Honda	Ret																0
	(Germany) Christian Gemmel	Honda									Ret								0
	(Germany) Nico Kehrer	Honda									Ret								0
	(Slovakia) Vladimir Častka	Yamaha										Ret							0
	(France) Grégory Lefort	Aprilia											Ret						0
	(Japan) Tekkyu Kayo	Yamaha													Ret				0
	(Japan) Noboyuki Osaki	Yamaha													Ret				0
	(Czech Republic) Radomil Rous	Honda										DNS							0
	(France) Yann Lussiana	Honda				DNQ													0
	(France) Samuel Aubry	Honda				DNQ													0
	(France) Hervé Mora	Aprilia				DNQ													0
	(Netherlands) Jan Blok	Honda							DNQ										0
	(United Kingdom) Christopher Sansome	Honda								DNQ									0
	(United Kingdom) Jason Boyce	Honda								WD									0
	(Switzerland) Roger Heierli	Honda										DNQ							0
	(Netherlands) Rob Filart	Honda											DNQ						0
	(Australia) Peter Taplin	Honda															DNQ		0
	(Australia) Earl Lynch	Yamaha															DNQ		0
	(Australia) Mark Stanley	Honda															DNQ		0
	(Spain) Luis Castro	Yamaha																DNQ	0
Pos	Rider	Bike	JPN (Japan)	RSA (South Africa)	SPA (Spain)	FRA (France)	ITA (Italy)	CAT (Catalonia)	NED (Netherlands)	GBR (United Kingdom)	GER (Germany)	CZE (Czech Republic)	POR (Portugal)	RIO (Rio de Janeiro (state))	PAC (Tochigi Prefecture)	MAL (Malaysia)	AUS (Australia)	VAL (Valencian Community)	Pts

Colour	Result
Gold	Winner
Silver	Second place
Bronze	Third place
Green	Points classification
Blue	Non-points classification
Blue	Non-classified finish (NC)
Purple	Retired, not classified (Ret)
Red	Did not qualify (DNQ)
Red	Did not pre-qualify (DNPQ)
Black	Disqualified (DSQ)
White	Did not start (DNS)
White	Withdrew (WD)
White	Race cancelled (C)
Blank	Did not practice (DNP)
Blank	Did not arrive (DNA)
Blank	Excluded (EX)

**Bold** – Pole position
Italics – Fastest lap

==== Constructors' standings ====
- Each constructor got the same number of points as their best placed rider in each race.
- Rounds marked with a light blue background were under wet race conditions or stopped by rain.

Pos	Constructor	JPN (Japan)	RSA (South Africa)	SPA (Spain)	FRA (France)	ITA (Italy)	CAT (Catalonia)	NED (Netherlands)	GBR (United Kingdom)	GER (Germany)	CZE (Czech Republic)	POR (Portugal)	RIO (Rio de Janeiro (state))	PAC (Tochigi Prefecture)	MAL (Malaysia)	AUS (Australia)	VAL (Valencian Community)	Pts
1	(Italy) Aprilia	3	1	1	1	1	1	1	1	1	1	1	3	1	1	1	1	382
2	(Japan) Honda	2	4	2	5	8	2	3	5	2	9	4	2	3	3	4	2	244
3	(Japan) Yamaha	1	8	7	8	7	7	4	8	3	2	3	1	8	4	3	8	211
Pos	Constructor	JPN (Japan)	RSA (South Africa)	SPA (Spain)	FRA (France)	ITA (Italy)	CAT (Catalonia)	NED (Netherlands)	GBR (United Kingdom)	GER (Germany)	CZE (Czech Republic)	POR (Portugal)	RIO (Rio de Janeiro (state))	PAC (Tochigi Prefecture)	MAL (Malaysia)	AUS (Australia)	VAL (Valencian Community)	Pts

=== 125cc standings ===
Scoring system

Points were awarded to the top fifteen finishers. A rider had to finish the race to earn points.

Position	**1st**	**2nd**	**3rd**	**4th**	**5th**	**6th**	**7th**	**8th**	**9th**	**10th**	**11th**	**12th**	**13th**	**14th**	**15th**
Points	25	20	16	13	11	10	9	8	7	6	5	4	3	2	1

==== Riders' standings ====
- Rounds marked with a light blue background were under wet race conditions or stopped by rain.
- Riders marked with light blue background were eligible for Rookie of the Year awards.

Pos	Rider	Bike	JPN (Japan)	RSA (South Africa)	SPA (Spain)	FRA (France)	ITA (Italy)	CAT (Catalonia)	NED (Netherlands)	GBR (United Kingdom)	GER (Germany)	CZE (Czech Republic)	POR (Portugal)	RIO (Rio de Janeiro (state))	PAC (Tochigi Prefecture)	MAL (Malaysia)	AUS (Australia)	VAL (Valencian Community)	Pts
1	(France) Arnaud Vincent	Aprilia	1	2	2	4	9	11	4	1	**1**	3	1	2	15	**1**	4	2	273
2	(San Marino) Manuel Poggiali	Gilera	3	1	DSQ	**2**	**1**	**1**	2	**3**	4	5	Ret	**3**	2	4	**1**	7	254
3	(Spain) Daniel Pedrosa	Honda	**8**	**3**	4	3	4	2	**1**	2	7	2	**10**	Ret	**1**	3	5	**1**	243
4	(Italy) Lucio Cecchinello	Aprilia	9	Ret	1	1	6	4	5	Ret	Ret	1	6	10	Ret	2	2	8	180
5	(Germany) Steve Jenkner	Aprilia	15	4	3	11	8	3	6	5	3	6	3	18	3	6	7	5	168
6	(Spain) Pablo Nieto	Aprilia	Ret	5	**Ret**	6	3	8	7	Ret	5	Ret	4	5	4	5	3	3	145
7	(Italy) Simone Sanna	Aprilia	5	8	7	Ret	11	5	12	17	6	7	2	14	Ret	11	6	14	106
8	(Japan) Masao Azuma	Honda	Ret	9	8	5	13	15	14	4	15	12	5	1	18	9	8	18	101
9	(San Marino) Alex de Angelis	Aprilia	Ret	6	Ret	Ret	7	Ret	9	7	2	**8**	Ret	11	Ret	10	Ret	4	87
10	(Italy) Gino Borsoi	Aprilia	10	7	10	10	5	Ret	13	Ret	10	9	7	12	7	19	Ret	10	82
11	(Finland) Mika Kallio	Honda	Ret	12	5	8	Ret	9	Ret	Ret	9	10	8	8	6	7	Ret	17	78
12	(Spain) Joan Olivé	Honda	13	Ret	9	Ret	Ret	6	3	6	11	Ret	Ret	22	8	13	9	9	76
13	(Japan) Youichi Ui	Derbi	Ret	Ret	6	Ret	2	Ret	8	8	8	17	Ret	Ret	12	12	13	Ret	65
14	(Spain) Héctor Barberá	Aprilia	16	DNS	12	15	Ret	18	20	Ret	21	4	Ret	15	5	8	14	6	50
15	(Italy) Mirko Giansanti	Honda	2	16	14	12	Ret	10	19	15	12	14	Ret	20	14	16	15	19	42
16	(Italy) Andrea Dovizioso	Honda	Ret	10	Ret	9	12	Ret	11	9	13	21	Ret	13	Ret	15	10	16	42
17	(Italy) Stefano Perugini	Italjet	11	24	16	Ret	15	13	Ret	11	Ret	18	Ret	6	20	Ret	12	Ret	28
18	(Italy) Andrea Ballerini	Honda	Ret	14	15	16	10	12	18	12	Ret	Ret	Ret						26
18	(Italy) Andrea Ballerini	Aprilia												16	22	Ret	11	12	26
19	(Italy) Stefano Bianco	Aprilia	Ret	22	19	7	Ret	7	29	Ret		13	Ret	17	17	Ret	Ret	13	24
20	(Japan) Shuhei Aoyama	Honda	6						25	10					11				21
21	(Spain) Jorge Lorenzo	Derbi			22	19	20	14	16	13	17	20	Ret	7	9	20	Ret	22	21
22	(Hungary) Gábor Talmácsi	Italjet	Ret	18	20	Ret	Ret												20
22	(Hungary) Gábor Talmácsi	Honda							15	Ret	18	11	Ret	4	21	Ret	16	15	20
23	(Japan) Noboru Ueda	Honda	4	11	17	Ret	DNS						Ret	25	27	18	21	Ret	18
24	(Spain) Ángel Rodríguez	Aprilia	7	Ret	Ret	Ret	Ret	Ret	10	Ret	14								17
25	(Italy) Max Sabbatani	Aprilia	Ret	13	11	13	DNS			Ret	22	15	Ret		19	Ret	17	11	17
26	(Germany) Klaus Nöhles	Honda	12	Ret	Ret	14	DNS				16	16	Ret	9	25	14	18	21	15
27	(Switzerland) Thomas Lüthi	Honda									26	19	9	24		21	Ret	24	7
28	(Japan) Hideyuki Nakajo	Honda													10				6
29	(United Kingdom) Chaz Davies	Aprilia	Ret	21	24	18	18	Ret	24	16	20	Ret	11	29	24	25	22	28	5
30	(Italy) Christian Pistoni	Italjet									Ret	Ret	12	19	Ret	Ret	Ret	Ret	4
31	(Italy) Michel Fabrizio	Gilera	Ret	15	18	17	16	Ret	Ret	Ret	23	25	Ret	23	13	26	Ret	20	4
32	(Czech Republic) Jakub Smrž	Honda	Ret	Ret	13	Ret	Ret	16	22										3
33	(Italy) Marco Simoncelli	Aprilia										27	13	21		Ret	Ret	Ret	3
34	(Italy) Alex Baldolini	Aprilia	14	20	21	Ret	19	20	21	18	19	Ret	Ret	Ret	26	23	20	Ret	2
35	(Italy) Gioele Pellino	Aprilia					14					22							2
36	(Spain) Julián Simón	Honda			Ret			22					14					Ret	2
37	(Italy) Fabrizio Lai	Honda							23	14									2
	(Japan) Takashi Yasuda	Honda													16				0
	(Italy) Mattia Angeloni	Gilera	17	17	23	21	Ret	19	26	23	27	24	Ret	27	28	17	19	Ret	0
	(Czech Republic) Jaroslav Huleš	Aprilia	Ret	Ret	Ret	Ret	Ret	21	17										0
	(Italy) Gaspare Caffiero	Honda					17												0
	(Italy) Gianluigi Scalvini	Aprilia						17	Ret										0
	(Hungary) Imre Tóth	Honda	18	23	27	22	21	23	27	20	25	26	Ret	28	23	22	23	25	0
	(Italy) Ivan Goi	Aprilia								19	24								0
	(Germany) Jarno Müller	Honda	Ret	19	26														0
	(Thailand) Suhathai Chaemsap	Honda	19																0
	(France) Gregory Lefort	Aprilia				20													0
	(United Kingdom) Christian Elkin	Honda								21									0
	(Italy) Simone Corsi	Honda					22												0
	(United Kingdom) Chris Martin	Honda								22									0
	(Spain) Álvaro Bautista	Aprilia			25			Ret										23	0
	(France) Jimmy Petit	Honda				23													0
	(Denmark) Robbin Harms	Honda										23							0
	(Germany) Dario Giuseppetti	Honda									28	29		26	Ret	24	24	27	0
	(United Kingdom) Leon Camier	Italjet						24	28	24									0
	(France) Gregory Leblanc	Honda				24													0
	(France) Yohann Tiberio	Honda				25													0
	(Australia) Josh Waters	Honda														Ret	25		0
	(Spain) Ruben Catalan	Aprilia			DNS													26	0
	(Australia) Peter Holmes	Honda															26		0
	(Australia) Jeremy Crowe	Honda															27		0
	(Czech Republic) Igor Kalab	Honda										28							0
	(Switzerland) Vincent Braillard	Honda				Ret												29	0
	(Germany) Claudius Klein	Honda									29								0
	(Czech Republic) Matej Smrž	Honda									32	30							0
	(Netherlands) Adri den Bekker	Honda							30										0
	(Germany) Patrick Unger	Honda									30								0
	(Netherlands) Randy Gevers	Honda							31										0
	(Germany) Jascha Büsch	Honda									31								0
	(Netherlands) Gerald Perdon	Honda							32										0
	(Germany) Manuel Mickan	Honda									33								0
	(Japan) Toshihisa Kuzuhara	Honda	Ret												Ret				0
	(Japan) Hideyuki Ogata	Honda	Ret												Ret				0
	(Japan) Akira Komuro	Honda	Ret												Ret				0
	(Italy) Marco Petrini	Aprilia					Ret												0
	(Italy) Alessandro Brannetti	Honda						Ret											0
	(Netherlands) Raymond Schouten	Honda							Ret										0
	(United Kingdom) Guy Farbrother	Honda								Ret									0
	(New Zealand) Midge Smart	Honda								Ret									0
	(Czech Republic) Lukáš Pešek	Honda										Ret							0
	(Canada) Chris Peris	Honda																Ret	0
	(Spain) Javier Machado	Honda						DNQ											0
	(Portugal) Pedro Monteiro	Honda											DNQ						0
	(Portugal) João Pinto	Honda											DNQ						0
	(Portugal) Filipe Costa	Yamaha											DNQ						0
	(Australia) Tim Inkster	Honda															DNQ		0
Pos	Rider	Bike	JPN (Japan)	RSA (South Africa)	SPA (Spain)	FRA (France)	ITA (Italy)	CAT (Catalonia)	NED (Netherlands)	GBR (United Kingdom)	GER (Germany)	CZE (Czech Republic)	POR (Portugal)	RIO (Rio de Janeiro (state))	PAC (Tochigi Prefecture)	MAL (Malaysia)	AUS (Australia)	VAL (Valencian Community)	Pts

Colour	Result
Gold	Winner
Silver	Second place
Bronze	Third place
Green	Points classification
Blue	Non-points classification
Blue	Non-classified finish (NC)
Purple	Retired, not classified (Ret)
Red	Did not qualify (DNQ)
Red	Did not pre-qualify (DNPQ)
Black	Disqualified (DSQ)
White	Did not start (DNS)
White	Withdrew (WD)
White	Race cancelled (C)
Blank	Did not practice (DNP)
Blank	Did not arrive (DNA)
Blank	Excluded (EX)

**Bold** – Pole position
Italics – Fastest lap

==== Constructors' standings ====
- Each constructor got the same number of points as their best placed rider in each race.
- Rounds marked with a light blue background were under wet race conditions or stopped by frain.

Pos	Constructor	JPN (Japan)	RSA (South Africa)	SPA (Spain)	FRA (France)	ITA (Italy)	CAT (Catalonia)	NED (Netherlands)	GBR (United Kingdom)	GER (Germany)	CZE (Czech Republic)	POR (Portugal)	RIO (Rio de Janeiro (state))	PAC (Tochigi Prefecture)	MAL (Malaysia)	AUS (Australia)	VAL (Valencian Community)	Pts
1	(Italy) Aprilia	1	2	1	1	3	3	4	1	1	1	1	2	3	1	2	2	341
2	(Japan) Honda	2	3	4	3	4	2	1	2	7	2	5	1	1	3	5	1	285
3	(Italy) Gilera	3	1	18	2	1	1	2	3	4	5	Ret	3	2	4	1	7	254
4	(Spain) Derbi	Ret	Ret	6	19	2	14	8	8	8	17	Ret	7	9	12	13	22	79
5	(Italy) Italjet	11	18	16	Ret	15	13	28	11	Ret	18	12	6	20	Ret	12	Ret	32
Pos	Constructor	JPN (Japan)	RSA (South Africa)	SPA (Spain)	FRA (France)	ITA (Italy)	CAT (Catalonia)	NED (Netherlands)	GBR (United Kingdom)	GER (Germany)	CZE (Czech Republic)	POR (Portugal)	RIO (Rio de Janeiro (state))	PAC (Tochigi Prefecture)	MAL (Malaysia)	AUS (Australia)	VAL (Valencian Community)	Pts

== Sources ==
- "Valencian Community Grand Prix – MotoGP – World Championship Classification" (PDF). MotoGP.com. Dorna Sports. 3 November 2002.
- "Valencian Community Grand Prix – 250cc – World Championship Classification" (PDF). MotoGP.com. Dorna Sports. 3 November 2002.
- "Valencian Community Grand Prix – 125cc – World Championship Classification" (PDF). MotoGP.com. Dorna Sports. 3 November 2002.
