= 2002 Valencian Community motorcycle Grand Prix =

2002 Valencian Community Grand Prix
Race details
- Race 16 of 16 races in the 2002 Grand Prix motorcycle racing season
- Date: 3 November 2002
- Official name: Gran Premio Marlboro de la Comunitat Valenciana
- Location: Circuit Ricardo Tormo
- Course: Permanent racing facility; 4.005 km (2.489 mi)

MotoGP
Pole position
Rider	(Italy) Max Biaggi	Yamaha
Time	1:33.211	
Fastest lap
Rider	(Brazil) Alex Barros	Honda
Time	1:33.873 on lap 5	
Podium
First	(Brazil) Alex Barros	Honda
Second	(Italy) Valentino Rossi	Honda
Third	(Italy) Max Biaggi	Yamaha

250cc
Pole position
Rider	(Italy) Marco Melandri	Aprilia
Time	1:35.885	
Fastest lap
Rider	(Italy) Marco Melandri	Aprilia
Time	1:36.784 on lap 4	
Podium
First	(Italy) Marco Melandri	Aprilia
Second	(Italy) Roberto Rolfo	Honda
Third	(Spain) Emilio Alzamora	Honda

125cc
Pole position
Rider	(Spain) Daniel Pedrosa	Honda
Time	1:39.426	
Fastest lap
Rider	(Germany) Steve Jenkner	Aprilia
Time	1:40.252 on lap 21	
Podium
First	(Spain) Daniel Pedrosa	Honda
Second	(France) Arnaud Vincent	Aprilia
Third	(Spain) Pablo Nieto	Aprilia

The 2002 Valencian Community motorcycle Grand Prix was the last round of the 2002 MotoGP Championship. It took place on the weekend of 1–3 November 2002 at the Circuit Ricardo Tormo.

== MotoGP classification ==
Pos.	No.	Rider	Team	Manufacturer	Laps	Time/Retired	Grid	Points
1	4	(Brazil) Alex Barros	West Honda Pons	Honda	30	47:22.404	2	25
2	46	(Italy) Valentino Rossi	Repsol Honda Team	Honda	30	+0.230	6	20
3	3	(Italy) Max Biaggi	Marlboro Yamaha Team	Yamaha	30	+15.213	1	16
4	74	(Japan) Daijiro Kato	Fortuna Honda Gresini	Honda	30	+22.504	3	13
5	11	(Japan) Tohru Ukawa	Repsol Honda Team	Honda	30	+35.165	7	11
6	56	(Japan) Shinya Nakano	Gauloises Yamaha Tech 3	Yamaha	30	+50.169	9	10
7	17	(Netherlands) Jurgen van den Goorbergh	Kanemoto Racing	Honda	30	+1:03.814	15	9
8	99	(United Kingdom) Jeremy McWilliams	Proton Team KR	Proton KR	30	+1:05.079	8	8
9	19	(France) Olivier Jacque	Gauloises Yamaha Tech 3	Yamaha	30	+1:08.312	11	7
10	6	(Japan) Norifumi Abe	Antena 3 Yamaha d'Antín	Yamaha	30	+1:08.312	20	6
11	21	(United States) John Hopkins	Red Bull Yamaha WCM	Yamaha	30	+1:26.241	17	5
12	84	(Australia) Andrew Pitt	Kawasaki Racing Team	Kawasaki	30	+1:27.427	18	4
13	15	(Spain) Sete Gibernau	Telefónica Movistar Suzuki	Suzuki	29	+1 lap	10	3
14	31	(Japan) Tetsuya Harada	Pramac Honda Racing Team	Honda	29	+1 lap	22	2
Ret (15)	10	(United States) Kenny Roberts Jr.	Telefónica Movistar Suzuki	Suzuki	24	Retirement	14	
Ret (16)	65	(Italy) Loris Capirossi	West Honda Pons	Honda	19	Accident	12	
Ret (17)	29	(Spain) David García	Proton Team KR	Proton KR	13	Retirement	19	
Ret (18)	8	(Australia) Garry McCoy	Red Bull Yamaha WCM	Yamaha	6	Accident	4	
Ret (19)	9	(Japan) Nobuatsu Aoki	Proton Team KR	Proton KR	1	Accident	16	
Ret (20)	55	(France) Régis Laconi	MS Aprilia Racing	Aprilia	1	Retirement	13	
Ret (21)	30	(Spain) José Luis Cardoso	Antena 3 Yamaha d'Antín	Yamaha	0	Collision	21	
Ret (22)	7	(Spain) Carlos Checa	Marlboro Yamaha Team	Yamaha	0	Collision	5	

== 250 cc classification ==
Pos.	No.	Rider	Manufacturer	Laps	Time/Retired	Grid	Points
1	3	(Italy) Marco Melandri	Aprilia	27	43:57.812	1	25
2	4	(Italy) Roberto Rolfo	Honda	27	+4.318	7	20
3	7	(Spain) Emilio Alzamora	Honda	27	+4.538	4	16
4	17	(France) Randy de Puniet	Aprilia	27	+18.214	2	13
5	15	(Italy) Roberto Locatelli	Aprilia	27	+21.990	12	11
6	42	(Spain) David Checa	Aprilia	27	+22.173	11	10
7	21	(Italy) Franco Battaini	Aprilia	27	+26.755	9	9
8	8	(Japan) Naoki Matsudo	Yamaha	27	+26.909	14	8
9	6	(Spain) Alex Debón	Aprilia	27	+26.915	5	7
10	24	(Spain) Toni Elías	Aprilia	27	+32.380	8	6
11	18	(Malaysia) Shahrol Yuzy	Yamaha	27	+36.294	13	5
12	11	(Japan) Haruchika Aoki	Honda	27	+42.879	16	4
13	27	(Australia) Casey Stoner	Aprilia	27	+42.889	10	3
14	12	(United Kingdom) Jay Vincent	Honda	27	+44.942	18	2
15	32	(Spain) Héctor Faubel	Aprilia	27	+47.348	15	1
16	13	(Czech Republic) Jaroslav Huleš	Yamaha	27	+47.849	19	
17	19	(United Kingdom) Leon Haslam	Honda	27	+1:06.850	21	
18	74	(Spain) Ángel Rodríguez	Aprilia	27	+1:20.276	26	
19	28	(Germany) Dirk Heidolf	Aprilia	27	+1:24.489	22	
20	36	(France) Erwan Nigon	Aprilia	27	+1:27.859	23	
21	90	(United States) Chuck Sorensen	Aprilia	26	+1 lap	27	
Ret (22)	96	(Czech Republic) Jakub Smrž	Honda	26	Accident	20	
Ret (23)	22	(Spain) Raúl Jara	Aprilia	15	Retirement	25	
Ret (24)	10	(Spain) Fonsi Nieto	Aprilia	7	Accident	6	
Ret (25)	34	(France) Eric Bataille	Honda	4	Accident	24	
Ret (26)	51	(France) Hugo Marchand	Aprilia	2	Retirement	17	
Ret (27)	9	(Argentina) Sebastián Porto	Yamaha	1	Retirement	3	
DNQ	39	(Spain) Luis Castro	Yamaha		Did not qualify		

== 125 cc classification ==
Pos.	No.	Rider	Manufacturer	Laps	Time/Retired	Grid	Points
1	26	(Spain) Daniel Pedrosa	Honda	25	42:13.044	1	25
2	21	(France) Arnaud Vincent	Aprilia	25	+0.100	4	20
3	22	(Spain) Pablo Nieto	Aprilia	25	+2.704	3	16
4	15	(San Marino) Alex de Angelis	Aprilia	25	+3.069	5	13
5	17	(Germany) Steve Jenkner	Aprilia	25	+3.136	7	11
6	80	(Spain) Héctor Barberá	Aprilia	25	+8.041	6	10
7	1	(San Marino) Manuel Poggiali	Gilera	25	+8.852	2	9
8	4	(Italy) Lucio Cecchinello	Aprilia	25	+11.879	18	8
9	25	(Spain) Joan Olivé	Honda	25	+12.037	12	7
10	23	(Italy) Gino Borsoi	Aprilia	25	+14.757	8	6
11	11	(Italy) Max Sabbatani	Aprilia	25	+15.167	13	5
12	50	(Italy) Andrea Ballerini	Aprilia	25	+18.472	9	4
13	33	(Italy) Stefano Bianco	Aprilia	25	+18.514	20	3
14	16	(Italy) Simone Sanna	Aprilia	25	+18.804	15	2
15	8	(Hungary) Gábor Talmácsi	Honda	25	+23.694	11	1
16	36	(Finland) Mika Kallio	Honda	25	+23.726	10	
17	34	(Italy) Andrea Dovizioso	Honda	25	+23.782	14	
18	5	(Japan) Masao Azuma	Honda	25	+23.958	19	
19	6	(Italy) Mirko Giansanti	Honda	25	+24.110	17	
20	84	(Italy) Michel Fabrizio	Gilera	25	+54.350	25	
21	12	(Germany) Klaus Nöhles	Honda	25	+58.575	30	
22	48	(Spain) Jorge Lorenzo	Derbi	25	+58.916	26	
23	51	(Spain) Álvaro Bautista	Aprilia	25	+59.286	28	
24	77	(Switzerland) Thomas Lüthi	Honda	25	+1:10.021	35	
25	20	(Hungary) Imre Tóth	Honda	25	+1:10.155	33	
26	71	(Spain) Rubén Catalán	Aprilia	25	+1:16.125	32	
27	72	(Germany) Dario Giuseppetti	Honda	25	+1:16.138	34	
28	57	(United Kingdom) Chaz Davies	Aprilia	25	+1:20.058	31	
29	59	(Switzerland) Vincent Braillard	Honda	24	+1 lap	37	
Ret (30)	7	(Italy) Stefano Perugini	Italjet	22	Retirement	27	
Ret (31)	31	(Italy) Mattia Angeloni	Gilera	20	Accident	23	
Ret (32)	52	(Spain) Julián Simón	Honda	18	Retirement	22	
Ret (33)	19	(Italy) Alex Baldolini	Aprilia	13	Retirement	29	
Ret (34)	41	(Japan) Youichi Ui	Derbi	10	Accident	16	
Ret (35)	42	(Italy) Christian Pistoni	Italjet	9	Accident	36	
Ret (36)	98	(Canada) Chris Peris	Aprilia	9	Retirement	38	
Ret (37)	9	(Japan) Noboru Ueda	Honda	3	Accident	21	
Ret (38)	37	(Italy) Marco Simoncelli	Aprilia	3	Accident	24	

== Championship standings after the race (MotoGP) ==
Below are the standings for the top five riders and constructors after round sixteen has concluded.

Riders' Championship standings

Pos.	Rider	Points
1	(Italy) Valentino Rossi	355
2	(Italy) Max Biaggi	215
3	(Japan) Tohru Ukawa	209
4	(Brazil) Alex Barros	204
5	(Spain) Carlos Checa	141

Constructors' Championship standings

Pos.	Constructor	Points
1	(Japan) Honda	390
2	(Japan) Yamaha	272
3	(Japan) Suzuki	143
4	(Malaysia) / (United States) Proton KR	96
5	(Italy) Aprilia	33

- Note: Only the top five positions are included for both sets of standings.

Previous race: 2002 Australian Grand Prix	FIM Grand Prix World Championship; 2002 season	Next race: 2003 Japanese Grand Prix
Previous race: 2001 Valencian Grand Prix	Valencian Community motorcycle Grand Prix	Next race: 2003 Valencian Grand Prix
