= 2002 French motorcycle Grand Prix =

(France) 2002 French Grand Prix
Race details
- Race 4 of 16 races in the 2002 Grand Prix motorcycle racing season
- Date: 19 May 2002
- Official name: Polini Grand Prix de France
- Location: Bugatti Circuit
- Course: Permanent racing facility; 4.180 km (2.597 mi)

MotoGP
Pole position
Rider	(Italy) Valentino Rossi	Honda
Time	1:36.046	
Fastest lap
Rider	(Italy) Valentino Rossi	Honda
Time	1:36.846 on lap 7	
Podium
First	(Italy) Valentino Rossi	Honda
Second	(Japan) Tohru Ukawa	Honda
Third	(Italy) Max Biaggi	Yamaha

250cc
Pole position
Rider	(Spain) Fonsi Nieto	Aprilia
Time	1:38.903	
Fastest lap
Rider	(Italy) Marco Melandri	Aprilia
Time	1:39.648 on lap 24	
Podium
First	(Spain) Fonsi Nieto	Aprilia
Second	(Italy) Marco Melandri	Aprilia
Third	(France) Randy de Puniet	Aprilia

125cc
Pole position
Rider	(San Marino) Manuel Poggiali	Gilera
Time	1:44.002	
Fastest lap
Rider	(Japan) Masao Azuma	Honda
Time	1:44.259 on lap 17	
Podium
First	(Italy) Lucio Cecchinello	Aprilia
Second	(San Marino) Manuel Poggiali	Gilera
Third	(Spain) Daniel Pedrosa	Honda

The 2002 French motorcycle Grand Prix was the fourth round of the 2002 MotoGP Championship. It took place on the weekend of 17–19 May 2002 at the Bugatti Circuit located in Le Mans, France.

== MotoGP classification ==
Jean-Michel Bayle replaced Garry McCoy from the second practice session.

The race was stopped for rain after 21 of the 28 scheduled laps; however sufficient distance was covered in order for full points to be awarded.

Pos.	No.	Rider	Team	Manufacturer	Laps	Time/Retired	Grid	Points
1	46	(Italy) Valentino Rossi	Repsol Honda Team	Honda	21	34:22.335	1	25
2	11	(Japan) Tohru Ukawa	Repsol Honda Team	Honda	21	+0.217	4	20
3	3	(Italy) Max Biaggi	Marlboro Yamaha Team	Yamaha	21	+0.604	3	16
4	6	(Japan) Norifumi Abe	Antena 3 Yamaha d'Antín	Yamaha	21	+1.701	12	13
5	10	(United States) Kenny Roberts Jr.	Telefónica Movistar Suzuki	Suzuki	21	+8.464	9	11
6	9	(Japan) Nobuatsu Aoki	Proton Team KR	Proton KR	21	+10.212	11	10
7	65	(Italy) Loris Capirossi	West Honda Pons	Honda	21	+12.437	7	9
8	4	(Brazil) Alex Barros	West Honda Pons	Honda	21	+15.231	15	8
9	55	(France) Régis Laconi	MS Aprilia Racing	Aprilia	21	+17.155	14	7
10	99	(United Kingdom) Jeremy McWilliams	Proton Team KR	Proton KR	21	+21.847	6	6
11	21	(United States) John Hopkins	Red Bull Yamaha WCM	Yamaha	21	+25.121	19	5
12	15	(Spain) Sete Gibernau	Telefónica Movistar Suzuki	Suzuki	21	+25.919	16	4
13	56	(Japan) Shinya Nakano	Gauloises Yamaha Tech 3	Yamaha	21	+26.227	10	3
14	18	(France) Jean-Michel Bayle	Red Bull Yamaha WCM	Yamaha	21	+27.011	18	2
15	17	(Netherlands) Jurgen van den Goorbergh	Kanemoto Racing	Honda	21	+30.342	17	1
16	30	(Spain) José Luis Cardoso	Antena 3 Yamaha d'Antín	Yamaha	21	+36.574	20	
Ret (17)	74	(Japan) Daijiro Kato	Fortuna Honda Gresini	Honda	11	Accident	5	
Ret (18)	19	(France) Olivier Jacque	Gauloises Yamaha Tech 3	Yamaha	10	Retirement	13	
Ret (19)	31	(Japan) Tetsuya Harada	Pramac Honda Racing Team	Honda	10	Retirement	8	
Ret (20)	7	(Spain) Carlos Checa	Marlboro Yamaha Team	Yamaha	8	Accident	2	

== 250 cc classification ==
Pos.	No.	Rider	Manufacturer	Laps	Time/Retired	Grid	Points
1	10	(Spain) Fonsi Nieto	Aprilia	26	43:41.140	1	25
2	3	(Italy) Marco Melandri	Aprilia	26	+0.252	4	20
3	17	(France) Randy de Puniet	Aprilia	26	+6.431	2	16
4	15	(Italy) Roberto Locatelli	Aprilia	26	+6.604	3	13
5	4	(Italy) Roberto Rolfo	Honda	26	+11.527	12	11
6	24	(Spain) Toni Elías	Aprilia	26	+13.157	5	10
7	7	(Spain) Emilio Alzamora	Honda	26	+13.870	15	9
8	9	(Argentina) Sebastián Porto	Yamaha	26	+20.077	9	8
9	6	(Spain) Alex Debón	Aprilia	26	+28.557	11	7
10	42	(Spain) David Checa	Aprilia	26	+28.684	17	6
11	8	(Japan) Naoki Matsudo	Yamaha	26	+28.892	10	5
12	76	(Japan) Taro Sekiguchi	Yamaha	26	+35.148	13	4
13	18	(Malaysia) Shahrol Yuzy	Yamaha	26	+35.344	14	3
14	32	(Spain) Héctor Faubel	Aprilia	26	+56.484	19	2
15	12	(United Kingdom) Jay Vincent	Honda	26	+56.894	16	1
16	25	(France) Vincent Philippe	Aprilia	26	+1:08.156	20	
17	41	(Netherlands) Jarno Janssen	Honda	26	+1:08.390	22	
18	28	(Germany) Dirk Heidolf	Aprilia	26	+1:16.135	23	
19	22	(Spain) Raúl Jara	Aprilia	26	+1:18.040	21	
20	36	(France) Erwan Nigon	Honda	25	+1 lap	24	
Ret (21)	35	(France) Thierry Van Den Bosch	Aprilia	13	Retirement	18	
Ret (22)	27	(Australia) Casey Stoner	Aprilia	9	Accident	7	
Ret (23)	21	(Italy) Franco Battaini	Aprilia	9	Accident	6	
Ret (24)	11	(Japan) Haruchika Aoki	Honda	4	Retirement	8	
Ret (25)	19	(United Kingdom) Leon Haslam	Honda	2	Retirement	25	
DNQ	37	(France) Yann Lussiana	Honda		Did not qualify		
DNQ	45	(France) Samuel Aubry	Honda		Did not qualify		
DNQ	93	(France) Hervé Mora	Aprilia		Did not qualify		
DNQ	51	(France) Hugo Marchand	Aprilia		Did not qualify		

== 125 cc classification ==
Pos.	No.	Rider	Manufacturer	Laps	Time/Retired	Grid	Points
1	4	(Italy) Lucio Cecchinello	Aprilia	24	42:09.029	4	25
2	1	(San Marino) Manuel Poggiali	Gilera	24	+0.076	1	20
3	26	(Spain) Daniel Pedrosa	Honda	24	+0.604	3	16
4	21	(France) Arnaud Vincent	Aprilia	24	+0.865	5	13
5	5	(Japan) Masao Azuma	Honda	24	+0.943	2	11
6	22	(Spain) Pablo Nieto	Aprilia	24	+1.618	7	10
7	33	(Italy) Stefano Bianco	Aprilia	24	+3.769	20	9
8	36	(Finland) Mika Kallio	Honda	24	+8.680	21	8
9	34	(Italy) Andrea Dovizioso	Honda	24	+8.915	11	7
10	23	(Italy) Gino Borsoi	Aprilia	24	+9.534	8	6
11	17	(Germany) Steve Jenkner	Aprilia	24	+11.749	16	5
12	6	(Italy) Mirko Giansanti	Honda	24	+20.252	13	4
13	11	(Italy) Max Sabbatani	Aprilia	24	+32.082	19	3
14	12	(Germany) Klaus Nöhles	Honda	24	+35.206	27	2
15	80	(Spain) Héctor Barberá	Aprilia	24	+49.526	22	1
16	50	(Italy) Andrea Ballerini	Honda	24	+1:02.359	24	
17	84	(Italy) Michel Fabrizio	Gilera	24	+1:07.571	26	
18	57	(United Kingdom) Chaz Davies	Aprilia	24	+1:10.303	23	
19	48	(Spain) Jorge Lorenzo	Derbi	24	+1:10.998	29	
20	86	(France) Grégory Lefort	Aprilia	24	+1:11.479	31	
21	31	(Italy) Mattia Angeloni	Gilera	24	+1:36.333	32	
22	20	(Hungary) Imre Tóth	Honda	24	+1:41.034	35	
23	63	(France) Jimmy Petit	Honda	24	+1:42.517	33	
24	85	(France) Grégory Leblanc	Honda	23	+1 lap	37	
25	58	(France) Yoann Tiberio	Honda	23	+1 lap	36	
Ret (26)	15	(San Marino) Alex de Angelis	Aprilia	11	Accident	6	
Ret (27)	39	(Czech Republic) Jaroslav Huleš	Aprilia	11	Accident	15	
Ret (28)	16	(Italy) Simone Sanna	Aprilia	10	Accident	12	
Ret (29)	25	(Spain) Joan Olivé	Honda	10	Accident	14	
Ret (30)	19	(Italy) Alex Baldolini	Aprilia	10	Accident	30	
Ret (31)	47	(Spain) Ángel Rodríguez	Aprilia	8	Accident	9	
Ret (32)	41	(Japan) Youichi Ui	Derbi	8	Accident	10	
Ret (33)	8	(Hungary) Gábor Talmácsi	Italjet	5	Accident	18	
Ret (34)	9	(Japan) Noboru Ueda	Honda	5	Accident	17	
Ret (35)	7	(Italy) Stefano Perugini	Italjet	4	Retirement	28	
Ret (36)	18	(Czech Republic) Jakub Smrž	Honda	0	Retirement	25	
Ret (37)	59	(Switzerland) Vincent Braillard	Honda	0	Accident	34	

== Championship standings after the race (MotoGP) ==
Below are the standings for the top five riders and constructors after round four has concluded.

Riders' Championship standings

Pos.	Rider	Points
1	(Italy) Valentino Rossi	95
2	(Japan) Tohru Ukawa	61
3	(Italy) Loris Capirossi	45
4	(Japan) Norifumi Abe	43
5	(Japan) Daijiro Kato	39

Constructors' Championship standings

Pos.	Constructor	Points
1	(Japan) Honda	100
2	(Japan) Yamaha	53
3	(Japan) Suzuki	39
4	(Malaysia) / (United States) Proton KR	28
5	(Italy) Aprilia	18

- Note: Only the top five positions are included for both sets of standings.

Previous race: 2002 Spanish Grand Prix	FIM Grand Prix World Championship; 2002 season	Next race: 2002 Italian Grand Prix
Previous race: 2001 French Grand Prix	French motorcycle Grand Prix	Next race: 2003 French Grand Prix
