= 2002 South African motorcycle Grand Prix =

(South Africa) 2002 South African Grand Prix
Race details
- Race 2 of 16 races in the 2002 Grand Prix motorcycle racing season
- Date: 21 April 2002
- Official name: Africa's Grand Prix
- Location: Phakisa Freeway
- Course: Permanent racing facility; 4.242 km (2.636 mi)

MotoGP
Pole position
Rider	(Italy) Valentino Rossi	Honda
Time	1:34.660	
Fastest lap
Rider	(Japan) Tohru Ukawa	Honda
Time	1:34.834 on lap 18	
Podium
First	(Japan) Tohru Ukawa	Honda
Second	(Italy) Valentino Rossi	Honda
Third	(Italy) Loris Capirossi	Honda

250cc
Pole position
Rider	(Italy) Franco Battaini	Aprilia
Time	1:37.604	
Fastest lap
Rider	(Spain) Fonsi Nieto	Aprilia
Time	1:37.860 on lap 24	
Podium
First	(Italy) Marco Melandri	Aprilia
Second	(Italy) Franco Battaini	Aprilia
Third	(Spain) Fonsi Nieto	Aprilia

125cc
Pole position
Rider	(Spain) Daniel Pedrosa	Honda
Time	1:42.522	
Fastest lap
Rider	(San Marino) Manuel Poggiali	Gilera
Time	1:42.605 on lap 23	
Podium
First	(San Marino) Manuel Poggiali	Gilera
Second	(France) Arnaud Vincent	Aprilia
Third	(Spain) Daniel Pedrosa	Honda

The 2002 South African motorcycle Grand Prix was the second round of the 2002 MotoGP Championship. It took place on the weekend of 19–21 April 2002 at the Phakisa Freeway.

== MotoGP classification ==
Pos.	No.	Rider	Team	Manufacturer	Laps	Time/Retired	Grid	Points
1	11	(Japan) Tohru Ukawa	Repsol Honda Team	Honda	28	44:39.467	3	25
2	46	(Italy) Valentino Rossi	Repsol Honda Team	Honda	28	+0.932	1	20
3	65	(Italy) Loris Capirossi	West Honda Pons	Honda	28	+8.259	2	16
4	74	(Japan) Daijiro Kato	Fortuna Honda Gresini	Honda	28	+26.962	14	13
5	7	(Spain) Carlos Checa	Marlboro Yamaha Team	Yamaha	28	+27.227	7	11
6	19	(France) Olivier Jacque	Gauloises Yamaha Tech 3	Yamaha	28	+27.889	9	10
7	6	(Japan) Norifumi Abe	Antena 3 Yamaha d'Antín	Yamaha	28	+30.215	15	9
8	56	(Japan) Shinya Nakano	Gauloises Yamaha Tech 3	Yamaha	28	+30.781	8	8
9	3	(Italy) Max Biaggi	Marlboro Yamaha Team	Yamaha	28	+43.796	4	7
10	8	(Australia) Garry McCoy	Red Bull Yamaha WCM	Yamaha	28	+45.501	5	6
11	17	(Netherlands) Jurgen van den Goorbergh	Kanemoto Racing	Honda	28	+1:06.938	12	5
12	31	(Japan) Tetsuya Harada	Pramac Honda Racing Team	Honda	28	+1:19.560	19	4
13	20	(Spain) Pere Riba	Antena 3 Yamaha d'Antín	Yamaha	28	+1:19.857	20	3
14	21	(United States) John Hopkins	Red Bull Yamaha WCM	Yamaha	28	+1:31.519	17	2
15	55	(France) Régis Laconi	MS Aprilia Racing	Aprilia	28	+1:32.725	18	1
16	15	(Spain) Sete Gibernau	Telefónica Movistar Suzuki	Suzuki	27	+1 lap	10	
Ret (17)	4	(Brazil) Alex Barros	West Honda Pons	Honda	26	Accident	13	
Ret (18)	10	(United States) Kenny Roberts Jr.	Telefónica Movistar Suzuki	Suzuki	9	Retirement	6	
Ret (19)	9	(Japan) Nobuatsu Aoki	Proton Team KR	Proton KR	7	Accident	11	
Ret (20)	99	(United Kingdom) Jeremy McWilliams	Proton Team KR	Proton KR	5	Retirement	16	

== 250 cc classification ==
Pos.	No.	Rider	Manufacturer	Laps	Time/Retired	Grid	Points
1	3	(Italy) Marco Melandri	Aprilia	26	42:52.922	2	25
2	21	(Italy) Franco Battaini	Aprilia	26	+2.962	1	20
3	10	(Spain) Fonsi Nieto	Aprilia	26	+5.213	5	16
4	4	(Italy) Roberto Rolfo	Honda	26	+6.290	3	13
5	15	(Italy) Roberto Locatelli	Aprilia	26	+6.675	7	11
6	17	(France) Randy de Puniet	Aprilia	26	+8.102	4	10
7	7	(Spain) Emilio Alzamora	Honda	26	+22.571	11	9
8	9	(Argentina) Sebastián Porto	Yamaha	26	+24.171	12	8
9	6	(Spain) Alex Debón	Aprilia	26	+28.161	9	7
10	42	(Spain) David Checa	Aprilia	26	+36.261	14	6
11	8	(Japan) Naoki Matsudo	Yamaha	26	+47.211	10	5
12	12	(United Kingdom) Jay Vincent	Honda	26	+47.886	22	4
13	11	(Japan) Haruchika Aoki	Honda	26	+53.106	13	3
14	28	(Germany) Dirk Heidolf	Aprilia	26	+1:02.767	20	2
15	19	(United Kingdom) Leon Haslam	Honda	26	+1:04.093	18	1
16	24	(Spain) Toni Elías	Aprilia	26	+1:13.435	15	
17	41	(Netherlands) Jarno Janssen	Honda	25	+1 lap	24	
Ret (18)	32	(Spain) Héctor Faubel	Aprilia	25	Accident	17	
Ret (19)	18	(Malaysia) Shahrol Yuzy	Yamaha	25	Accident	16	
Ret (20)	22	(Spain) Raúl Jara	Aprilia	9	Accident	6	
Ret (21)	27	(Australia) Casey Stoner	Aprilia	2	Accident	8	
Ret (22)	51	(France) Hugo Marchand	Aprilia	1	Retirement	23	
Ret (23)	25	(France) Vincent Philippe	Aprilia	1	Accident	21	
Ret (24)	76	(Japan) Taro Sekiguchi	Yamaha	0	Accident	19	

== 125 cc classification ==
Pos.	No.	Rider	Manufacturer	Laps	Time/Retired	Grid	Points
1	1	(San Marino) Manuel Poggiali	Gilera	24	41:26.120	2	25
2	21	(France) Arnaud Vincent	Aprilia	24	+0.270	4	20
3	26	(Spain) Daniel Pedrosa	Honda	24	+0.826	1	16
4	17	(Germany) Steve Jenkner	Aprilia	24	+1.098	6	13
5	22	(Spain) Pablo Nieto	Aprilia	24	+1.187	3	11
6	15	(San Marino) Alex de Angelis	Aprilia	24	+1.583	12	10
7	23	(Italy) Gino Borsoi	Aprilia	24	+1.830	8	9
8	16	(Italy) Simone Sanna	Aprilia	24	+12.839	16	8
9	5	(Japan) Masao Azuma	Honda	24	+13.942	11	7
10	34	(Italy) Andrea Dovizioso	Honda	24	+19.201	14	6
11	9	(Japan) Noboru Ueda	Honda	24	+19.210	15	5
12	36	(Finland) Mika Kallio	Honda	24	+39.207	19	4
13	11	(Italy) Max Sabbatani	Aprilia	24	+46.560	22	3
14	50	(Italy) Andrea Ballerini	Honda	24	+53.710	26	2
15	84	(Italy) Michel Fabrizio	Gilera	24	+53.868	25	1
16	6	(Italy) Mirko Giansanti	Honda	24	+54.001	21	
17	31	(Italy) Mattia Angeloni	Gilera	24	+54.739	30	
18	8	(Hungary) Gábor Talmácsi	Italjet	24	+54.886	23	
19	10	(Germany) Jarno Müller	Honda	24	+54.919	18	
20	19	(Italy) Alex Baldolini	Aprilia	24	+1:07.871	28	
21	57	(United Kingdom) Chaz Davies	Aprilia	24	+1:08.217	29	
22	33	(Italy) Stefano Bianco	Aprilia	24	+1:15.825	10	
23	20	(Hungary) Imre Tóth	Honda	24	+1:36.139	31	
24	7	(Italy) Stefano Perugini	Italjet	24	+1:43.455	24	
Ret (25)	47	(Spain) Ángel Rodríguez	Aprilia	11	Accident	7	
Ret (26)	39	(Czech Republic) Jaroslav Huleš	Aprilia	6	Retirement	9	
Ret (27)	12	(Germany) Klaus Nöhles	Honda	0	Accident	27	
Ret (28)	18	(Czech Republic) Jakub Smrž	Honda	0	Accident	20	
Ret (29)	25	(Spain) Joan Olivé	Honda	0	Accident	13	
Ret (30)	4	(Italy) Lucio Cecchinello	Aprilia	0	Accident	5	
Ret (31)	41	(Japan) Youichi Ui	Derbi	0	Accident	17	
DNS	80	(Spain) Héctor Barberá	Aprilia		Did not start		

== Championship standings after the race (MotoGP) ==
Below are the standings for the top five riders and constructors after round two has concluded.

Riders' Championship standings

Pos.	Rider	Points
1	(Italy) Valentino Rossi	45
2	(Spain) Carlos Checa	27
3	(Japan) Tohru Ukawa	25
4	(Italy) Loris Capirossi	23
5	(Japan) Akira Ryō	20

Constructors' Championship standings

Pos.	Constructor	Points
1	(Japan) Honda	50
2	(Japan) Yamaha	27
3	(Japan) Suzuki	20
4	(Malaysia) / (United States) Proton KR	9
5	(Italy) Aprilia	9

- Note: Only the top five positions are included for both sets of standings.

Previous race: 2002 Japanese Grand Prix	FIM Grand Prix World Championship; 2002 season	Next race: 2002 Spanish Grand Prix
Previous race: 2001 South African Grand Prix	South African motorcycle Grand Prix	Next race: 2003 South African Grand Prix
