= 2002 Spanish motorcycle Grand Prix =

(Spain) 2002 Spanish Grand Prix
Race details
- Race 3 of 16 races in the 2002 Grand Prix motorcycle racing season
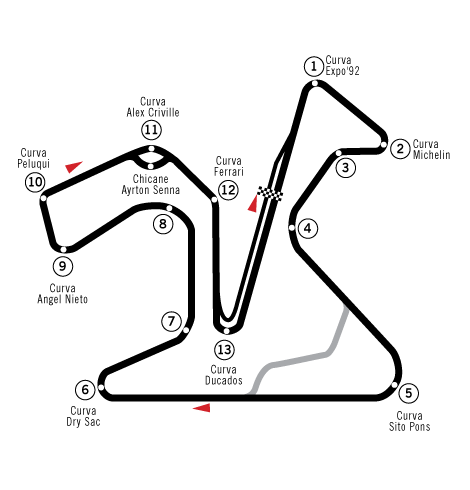
- Date: 5 May 2002
- Official name: Gran Premio Marlboro de España
- Location: Circuito de Jerez
- Course: Permanent racing facility; 4.423 km (2.748 mi)

MotoGP
Pole position
Rider	(Italy) Valentino Rossi	Honda
Time	1:42.193	
Fastest lap
Rider	(Italy) Valentino Rossi	Honda
Time	1:42.920 on lap 4	
Podium
First	(Italy) Valentino Rossi	Honda
Second	(Japan) Daijiro Kato	Honda
Third	(Japan) Tohru Ukawa	Honda

250cc
Pole position
Rider	(Italy) Franco Battaini	Aprilia
Time	1:44.803	
Fastest lap
Rider	(Spain) Fonsi Nieto	Aprilia
Time	1:45.243 on lap 22	
Podium
First	(Spain) Fonsi Nieto	Aprilia
Second	(Italy) Roberto Rolfo	Honda
Third	(Spain) Emilio Alzamora	Honda

125cc
Pole position
Rider	(Spain) Pablo Nieto	Aprilia
Time	1:49.018	
Fastest lap
Rider	(Italy) Lucio Cecchinello	Aprilia
Time	1:48.620 on lap 4	
Podium
First	(Italy) Lucio Cecchinello	Aprilia
Second	(France) Arnaud Vincent	Aprilia
Third	(Germany) Steve Jenkner	Aprilia

The 2002 Spanish motorcycle Grand Prix was the third round of the 2002 MotoGP Championship. It took place on the weekend of 3–5 May 2002 at the Circuito de Jerez.

The race became significantly notable in later years, as it marked the professional debut of future MotoGP champion Jorge Lorenzo, who reached the legal age limit of 15 years old on the second day of free practice.

== MotoGP classification ==
Pos.	No.	Rider	Team	Manufacturer	Laps	Time/Retired	Grid	Points
1	46	(Italy) Valentino Rossi	Repsol Honda Team	Honda	27	46:51.843	1	25
2	74	(Japan) Daijiro Kato	Fortuna Honda Gresini	Honda	27	+1.190	4	20
3	11	(Japan) Tohru Ukawa	Repsol Honda Team	Honda	27	+2.445	6	16
4	65	(Italy) Loris Capirossi	West Honda Pons	Honda	27	+2.830	3	13
5	4	(Brazil) Alex Barros	West Honda Pons	Honda	27	+4.117	2	11
6	6	(Japan) Norifumi Abe	Antena 3 Yamaha d'Antín	Yamaha	27	+18.517	10	10
7	9	(Japan) Nobuatsu Aoki	Proton Team KR	Proton KR	27	+31.785	15	9
8	10	(United States) Kenny Roberts Jr.	Telefónica Movistar Suzuki	Suzuki	27	+33.876	9	8
9	15	(Spain) Sete Gibernau	Telefónica Movistar Suzuki	Suzuki	27	+38.762	13	7
10	31	(Japan) Tetsuya Harada	Pramac Honda Racing Team	Honda	27	+39.975	11	6
11	19	(France) Olivier Jacque	Gauloises Yamaha Tech 3	Yamaha	27	+47.496	8	5
12	17	(Netherlands) Jurgen van den Goorbergh	Kanemoto Racing	Honda	27	+47.930	17	4
13	21	(United States) John Hopkins	Red Bull Yamaha WCM	Yamaha	27	+50.249	16	3
14	55	(France) Régis Laconi	MS Aprilia Racing	Aprilia	27	+50.684	19	2
15	8	(Australia) Garry McCoy	Red Bull Yamaha WCM	Yamaha	27	+53.293 (Note: McCoy and McWilliams both received a 5 second penalty added to their race time for overtaking under yellow flags.)	18	1
16	99	(United Kingdom) Jeremy McWilliams	Proton Team KR	Proton KR	27	+54.171	12	
17	56	(Japan) Shinya Nakano	Gauloises Yamaha Tech 3	Yamaha	27	+1:24.014	14	
Ret (18)	7	(Spain) Carlos Checa	Marlboro Yamaha Team	Yamaha	26	Retirement	5	
Ret (19)	20	(Spain) Pere Riba	Antena 3 Yamaha d'Antín	Yamaha	2	Retirement	20	
DSQ (20)	3	(Italy) Max Biaggi	Marlboro Yamaha Team	Yamaha		Black flag (Note: Biaggi was punished with the black flag for ignoring a stop and go penalty after a jump start.)	7	

== 250 cc classification ==
Pos.	No.	Rider	Manufacturer	Laps	Time/Retired	Grid	Points
1	10	(Spain) Fonsi Nieto	Aprilia	26	46:03.241	2	25
2	4	(Italy) Roberto Rolfo	Honda	26	+1.987	5	20
3	7	(Spain) Emilio Alzamora	Honda	26	+5.355	9	16
4	21	(Italy) Franco Battaini	Aprilia	26	+11.484	1	13
5	15	(Italy) Roberto Locatelli	Aprilia	26	+11.982	11	11
6	27	(Australia) Casey Stoner	Aprilia	26	+16.476	7	10
7	9	(Argentina) Sebastián Porto	Yamaha	26	+23.987	4	9
8	6	(Spain) Alex Debón	Aprilia	26	+33.173	8	8
9	8	(Japan) Naoki Matsudo	Yamaha	26	+33.473	12	7
10	24	(Spain) Toni Elías	Aprilia	26	+44.011	10	6
11	32	(Spain) Héctor Faubel	Aprilia	26	+47.047	17	5
12	11	(Japan) Haruchika Aoki	Honda	26	+48.583	15	4
13	18	(Malaysia) Shahrol Yuzy	Yamaha	26	+1:01.097	18	3
14	34	(Andorra) Eric Bataille	Honda	26	+1:01.120	21	2
15	76	(Japan) Taro Sekiguchi	Yamaha	26	+1:01.429	16	1
16	22	(Spain) Raúl Jara	Aprilia	26	+1:01.659	13	
17	12	(United Kingdom) Jay Vincent	Honda	26	+1:06.893	19	
18	25	(France) Vincent Philippe	Aprilia	26	+1:09.713	23	
19	19	(United Kingdom) Leon Haslam	Honda	26	+1:15.733	24	
20	41	(Netherlands) Jarno Janssen	Honda	25	+1 lap	20	
Ret (21)	3	(Italy) Marco Melandri	Aprilia	25	Retirement	3	
Ret (22)	17	(France) Randy de Puniet	Aprilia	15	Accident	6	
Ret (23)	42	(Spain) David Checa	Aprilia	4	Accident	14	
Ret (24)	51	(France) Hugo Marchand	Aprilia	3	Accident	22	
Ret (25)	28	(Germany) Dirk Heidolf	Aprilia	0	Retirement	25	
DNQ	39	(Spain) Luis Castro	Yamaha		Did not qualify		

== 125 cc classification ==
Pos.	No.	Rider	Manufacturer	Laps	Time/Retired	Grid	Points
1	4	(Italy) Lucio Cecchinello	Aprilia	23	42:08.107	6	25
2	21	(France) Arnaud Vincent	Aprilia	23	+2.274	2	20
3	17	(Germany) Steve Jenkner	Aprilia	23	+2.773	5	16
4	26	(Spain) Daniel Pedrosa	Honda	23	+8.618	8	13
5	36	(Finland) Mika Kallio	Honda	23	+13.089	17	11
6	41	(Japan) Youichi Ui	Derbi	23	+13.624	11	10
7	16	(Italy) Simone Sanna	Aprilia	23	+15.181	9	9
8	5	(Japan) Masao Azuma	Honda	23	+19.116	19	8
9	25	(Spain) Joan Olivé	Honda	23	+19.185	12	7
10	23	(Italy) Gino Borsoi	Aprilia	23	+24.193	7	6
11	11	(Italy) Max Sabbatani	Aprilia	23	+34.510	23	5
12	80	(Spain) Héctor Barberá	Aprilia	23	+34.563	16	4
13	18	(Czech Republic) Jakub Smrž	Honda	23	+37.315	20	3
14	6	(Italy) Mirko Giansanti	Honda	23	+37.950	15	2
15	50	(Italy) Andrea Ballerini	Honda	23	+39.897	30	1
16	7	(Italy) Stefano Perugini	Italjet	23	+57.693	13	
17	9	(Japan) Noboru Ueda	Honda	23	+1:03.935	21	
18	84	(Italy) Michel Fabrizio	Gilera	23	+1:03.959	32	
19	33	(Italy) Stefano Bianco	Aprilia	23	+1:03.971	18	
20	8	(Hungary) Gábor Talmácsi	Italjet	23	+1:05.248	22	
21	19	(Italy) Alex Baldolini	Aprilia	23	+1:05.515	31	
22	48	(Spain) Jorge Lorenzo	Derbi	23	+1:11.361	33	
23	31	(Italy) Mattia Angeloni	Gilera	23	+1:13.117	34	
24	57	(United Kingdom) Chaz Davies	Aprilia	23	+1:17.907	28	
25	51	(Spain) Álvaro Bautista	Aprilia	23	+1:20.614	26	
26	10	(Germany) Jarno Müller	Honda	23	+1:23.174	24	
27	20	(Hungary) Imre Tóth	Honda	23	+1:50.192	35	
Ret (28)	12	(Germany) Klaus Nöhles	Honda	22	Retirement	27	
Ret (29)	15	(San Marino) Alex de Angelis	Aprilia	21	Accident	4	
Ret (30)	34	(Italy) Andrea Dovizioso	Honda	21	Retirement	10	
Ret (31)	52	(Spain) Julián Simón	Honda	14	Accident	29	
Ret (32)	22	(Spain) Pablo Nieto	Aprilia	8	Accident	1	
Ret (33)	39	(Czech Republic) Jaroslav Huleš	Aprilia	7	Retirement	25	
Ret (34)	47	(Spain) Ángel Rodríguez	Aprilia	6	Accident	14	
DNS	71	(Spain) Rubén Catalán	Aprilia	0	Did not start	36	
DSQ (35)	1	(San Marino) Manuel Poggiali	Gilera	23	(+21.674) (Note: Poggiali was excluded from the race results for riding in an irresponsible manner.)	3	

== Championship standings after the race (MotoGP) ==
Below are the standings for the top five riders and constructors after round three has concluded.

Riders' Championship standings

Pos.	Rider	Points
1	(Italy) Valentino Rossi	70
2	(Japan) Tohru Ukawa	41
3	(Japan) Daijiro Kato	39
4	(Italy) Loris Capirossi	36
5	(Japan) Norifumi Abe	30

Constructors' Championship standings

Pos.	Constructor	Points
1	(Japan) Honda	75
2	(Japan) Yamaha	37
3	(Japan) Suzuki	28
4	(Malaysia) / (United States) Proton KR	18
5	(Italy) Aprilia	11

- Note: Only the top five positions are included for both sets of standings.

== Notes ==
Previous race: 2002 South African Grand Prix	FIM Grand Prix World Championship; 2002 season	Next race: 2002 French Grand Prix
Previous race: 2001 Spanish Grand Prix	Spanish motorcycle Grand Prix	Next race: 2003 Spanish Grand Prix
