= 2002 Catalan motorcycle Grand Prix =

(Catalonia) 2002 Catalan Grand Prix
Race details
- Race 6 of 16 races in the 2002 Grand Prix motorcycle racing season
- Date: 16 June 2002
- Official name: Gran Premi Marlboro de Catalunya
- Location: Circuit de Catalunya
- Course: Permanent racing facility; 4.727 km (2.937 mi)

MotoGP
Pole position
Rider	(Italy) Max Biaggi	Yamaha
Time	1:44.523	
Fastest lap
Rider	(Italy) Valentino Rossi	Honda
Time	1:45.594 on lap 5	
Podium
First	(Italy) Valentino Rossi	Honda
Second	(Japan) Tohru Ukawa	Honda
Third	(Spain) Carlos Checa	Yamaha

250cc
Pole position
Rider	(Spain) Fonsi Nieto	Aprilia
Time	1:47.315	
Fastest lap
Rider	(Italy) Franco Battaini	Aprilia
Time	1:48.063 on lap 3	
Podium
First	(Italy) Marco Melandri	Aprilia
Second	(Italy) Roberto Rolfo	Honda
Third	(Spain) Fonsi Nieto	Aprilia

125cc
Pole position
Rider	(San Marino) Manuel Poggiali	Gilera
Time	1:51.216	
Fastest lap
Rider	(Japan) Youichi Ui	Derbi
Time	1:51.443 on lap 10	
Podium
First	(San Marino) Manuel Poggiali	Gilera
Second	(Spain) Daniel Pedrosa	Honda
Third	(Germany) Steve Jenkner	Aprilia

The 2002 Catalan motorcycle Grand Prix was the sixth round of the 2002 MotoGP Championship. It took place on the weekend of 14–16 June 2002 at the Circuit de Catalunya located in Montmeló, Catalonia, Spain.

== MotoGP classification ==
Pos.	No.	Rider	Team	Manufacturer	Laps	Time/Retired	Grid	Points
1	46	(Italy) Valentino Rossi	Repsol Honda Team	Honda	25	44:20.679	4	25
2	11	(Japan) Tohru Ukawa	Repsol Honda Team	Honda	25	+0.880	2	20
3	7	(Spain) Carlos Checa	Marlboro Yamaha Team	Yamaha	25	+8.531	7	16
4	3	(Italy) Max Biaggi	Marlboro Yamaha Team	Yamaha	25	+11.918	1	13
5	4	(Brazil) Alex Barros	West Honda Pons	Honda	25	+22.382	9	11
6	65	(Italy) Loris Capirossi	West Honda Pons	Honda	25	+30.096	5	10
7	10	(United States) Kenny Roberts Jr.	Telefónica Movistar Suzuki	Suzuki	25	+31.525	8	9
8	74	(Japan) Daijiro Kato	Fortuna Honda Gresini	Honda	25	+33.912	15	8
9	19	(France) Olivier Jacque	Gauloises Yamaha Tech 3	Yamaha	25	+36.847	11	7
10	21	(United States) John Hopkins	Red Bull Yamaha WCM	Yamaha	25	+51.580	6	6
11	33	(Japan) Akira Ryō	Team Suzuki	Suzuki	25	+53.303	17	5
12	99	(United Kingdom) Jeremy McWilliams	Proton Team KR	Proton KR	25	+57.585	12	4
13	31	(Japan) Tetsuya Harada	Pramac Honda Racing Team	Honda	25	+1:01.823	20	3
14	55	(France) Régis Laconi	MS Aprilia Racing	Aprilia	25	+1:03.002	13	2
15	20	(Spain) Pere Riba	Antena 3 Yamaha d'Antín	Yamaha	25	+1:04.723	21	1
16	6	(Japan) Norifumi Abe	Antena 3 Yamaha d'Antín	Yamaha	23	+2 laps	16	
Ret (17)	66	(Germany) Alex Hofmann	Red Bull Yamaha WCM	Yamaha	24	Retirement	19	
Ret (18)	15	(Spain) Sete Gibernau	Telefónica Movistar Suzuki	Suzuki	6	Accident	3	
Ret (19)	9	(Japan) Nobuatsu Aoki	Proton Team KR	Proton KR	2	Retirement	18	
Ret (20)	17	(Netherlands) Jurgen van den Goorbergh	Kanemoto Racing	Honda	0	Accident	14	
Ret (21)	56	(Japan) Shinya Nakano	Gauloises Yamaha Tech 3	Yamaha	0	Accident	10	

== 250 cc classification ==
Pos.	No.	Rider	Manufacturer	Laps	Time/Retired	Grid	Points
1	3	(Italy) Marco Melandri	Aprilia	23	41:40.377	2	25
2	4	(Italy) Roberto Rolfo	Honda	23	+2.193	6	20
3	10	(Spain) Fonsi Nieto	Aprilia	23	+2.689	1	16
4	17	(France) Randy de Puniet	Aprilia	23	+2.950	4	13
5	21	(Italy) Franco Battaini	Aprilia	23	+4.538	5	11
6	27	(Australia) Casey Stoner	Aprilia	23	+23.101	13	10
7	8	(Japan) Naoki Matsudo	Yamaha	23	+23.215	11	9
8	18	(Malaysia) Shahrol Yuzy	Yamaha	23	+23.374	12	8
9	7	(Spain) Emilio Alzamora	Honda	23	+24.586	7	7
10	24	(Spain) Toni Elías	Aprilia	23	+30.721	9	6
11	11	(Japan) Haruchika Aoki	Honda	23	+37.908	14	5
12	42	(Spain) David Checa	Aprilia	23	+38.456	15	4
13	6	(Spain) Alex Debón	Aprilia	23	+40.607	10	3
14	51	(France) Hugo Marchand	Aprilia	23	+1:00.034	19	2
15	22	(Spain) Raúl Jara	Aprilia	23	+1:02.087	17	1
16	76	(Japan) Taro Sekiguchi	Yamaha	23	+1:02.410	16	
17	25	(France) Vincent Philippe	Aprilia	23	+1:02.643	18	
18	19	(United Kingdom) Leon Haslam	Honda	23	+1:09.785	20	
19	12	(United Kingdom) Jay Vincent	Honda	23	+1:17.851	21	
20	32	(Spain) Héctor Faubel	Aprilia	23	+1:30.113	22	
21	28	(Germany) Dirk Heidolf	Aprilia	23	+1:31.937	25	
22	41	(Netherlands) Jarno Janssen	Honda	23	+1:47.797	23	
Ret (23)	34	(France) Eric Bataille	Honda	7	Retirement	24	
Ret (24)	15	(Italy) Roberto Locatelli	Aprilia	5	Accident	3	
Ret (25)	9	(Argentina) Sebastián Porto	Yamaha	4	Retirement	8	

== 125 cc classification ==
Pos.	No.	Rider	Manufacturer	Laps	Time/Retired	Grid	Points
1	1	(San Marino) Manuel Poggiali	Gilera	22	41:18.211	1	25
2	26	(Spain) Daniel Pedrosa	Honda	22	+0.019	4	20
3	17	(Germany) Steve Jenkner	Aprilia	22	+9.888	3	16
4	4	(Italy) Lucio Cecchinello	Aprilia	22	+15.397	5	13
5	16	(Italy) Simone Sanna	Aprilia	22	+15.452	8	11
6	25	(Spain) Joan Olivé	Honda	22	+15.486	21	10
7	33	(Italy) Stefano Bianco	Aprilia	22	+15.549	11	9
8	22	(Spain) Pablo Nieto	Aprilia	22	+16.218	2	8
9	36	(Finland) Mika Kallio	Honda	22	+22.762	10	7
10	6	(Italy) Mirko Giansanti	Honda	22	+22.839	16	6
11	21	(France) Arnaud Vincent	Aprilia	22	+23.067	18	5
12	50	(Italy) Andrea Ballerini	Honda	22	+23.134	19	4
13	7	(Italy) Stefano Perugini	Italjet	22	+43.345	17	3
14	48	(Spain) Jorge Lorenzo	Derbi	22	+43.973	7	2
15	5	(Japan) Masao Azuma	Honda	22	+47.189	13	1
16	18	(Czech Republic) Jakub Smrž	Honda	22	+47.333	24	
17	32	(Italy) Gianluigi Scalvini	Aprilia	22	+52.000	23	
18	80	(Spain) Héctor Barberá	Aprilia	22	+1:11.358	27	
19	31	(Italy) Mattia Angeloni	Gilera	22	+1:11.488	29	
20	19	(Italy) Alex Baldolini	Aprilia	22	+1:21.603	32	
21	39	(Czech Republic) Jaroslav Huleš	Aprilia	22	+1:21.681	15	
22	52	(Spain) Julián Simón	Honda	22	+1:31.723	26	
23	20	(Hungary) Imre Tóth	Honda	22	+1:31.794	31	
24	24	(United Kingdom) Leon Camier	Italjet	21	+1 lap	33	
Ret (25)	57	(United Kingdom) Chaz Davies	Aprilia	18	Retirement	22	
Ret (26)	84	(Italy) Michel Fabrizio	Gilera	14	Accident	20	
Ret (27)	41	(Japan) Youichi Ui	Derbi	13	Accident	6	
Ret (28)	15	(San Marino) Alex de Angelis	Aprilia	13	Accident	12	
Ret (29)	47	(Spain) Ángel Rodríguez	Aprilia	4	Retirement	25	
Ret (30)	23	(Italy) Gino Borsoi	Aprilia	0	Accident	9	
Ret (31)	34	(Italy) Andrea Dovizioso	Honda	0	Accident	14	
Ret (32)	44	(Italy) Alessandro Brannetti	Honda	0	Accident	30	
Ret (33)	51	(Spain) Álvaro Bautista	Aprilia	0	Accident	28	
DNQ	55	(Spain) Javier Machado	Honda		Did not qualify		

== Championship standings after the race (MotoGP) ==
Below are the standings for the top five riders and constructors after round six has concluded.

Riders' Championship standings

Pos.	Rider	Points
1	(Italy) Valentino Rossi	145
2	(Japan) Tohru Ukawa	97
3	(Italy) Loris Capirossi	65
4	(Italy) Max Biaggi	56
5	(Spain) Carlos Checa	56

Constructors' Championship standings

Pos.	Constructor	Points
1	(Japan) Honda	150
2	(Japan) Yamaha	89
3	(Japan) Suzuki	48
4	(Malaysia) / (United States) Proton KR	32
5	(Italy) Aprilia	28

- Note: Only the top five positions are included for both sets of standings.

Previous race: 2002 Italian Grand Prix	FIM Grand Prix World Championship; 2002 season	Next race: 2002 Dutch TT
Previous race: 2001 Catalan Grand Prix	Catalan motorcycle Grand Prix	Next race: 2003 Catalan Grand Prix
