= Peter Politiek =

Dutch motorcycle racer (born 1984)

Peter Politiek Jr (born 1984, Singapore) is a former motorcycle racer from the Netherlands. He competed in the Dutch Superbikes and the German IDM Superbikes Championships.

== Background ==
In the 2009 season, Politiek took his first Dutch Superbikes pole position and win. Peter has been a testrider for Moto73 magazine since 2017. In 2010 Dutch Superbikes he finished 4th. In 2011 Dutch Superbikes he finished 11th.

After running into many problems when switching teams and brands for the 2012 season, Politiek decided to take a racing sabbatical and only competed in selected Dutch Superbikes races and AHRMA Vintage races in the 2012 season. Ending his professional racing career after the last Dutch Superbikes race in Assen in October of 2012. Currently, Politiek races in selected (international) events on modern and vintage motorcycles and still is a testrider for Moto73 magazine in the Netherlands.

Politiek is a four-time Dutch National show-jumping champion. He is still the youngest rider ever (age eight) to win a national championship in horseback riding in the Netherlands. He competed in the 2002 Dutch 250cc Grand Prix of the Netherlands as a wild-card at the age of 17. He is the youngest Dutch rider to start in the 250cc Grand Prix class of the MotoGP World Championships. He suffered a near fatal crash in a European Championship race nearly a month later. It put the Dutch rider into an (artificial) coma for six weeks. In 2006, Politiek won two American Vintage Racing Championships when competing in the AHRMA championship series during his time in the US.
