= Lucio Cecchinello =

Italian former motorcycle racer

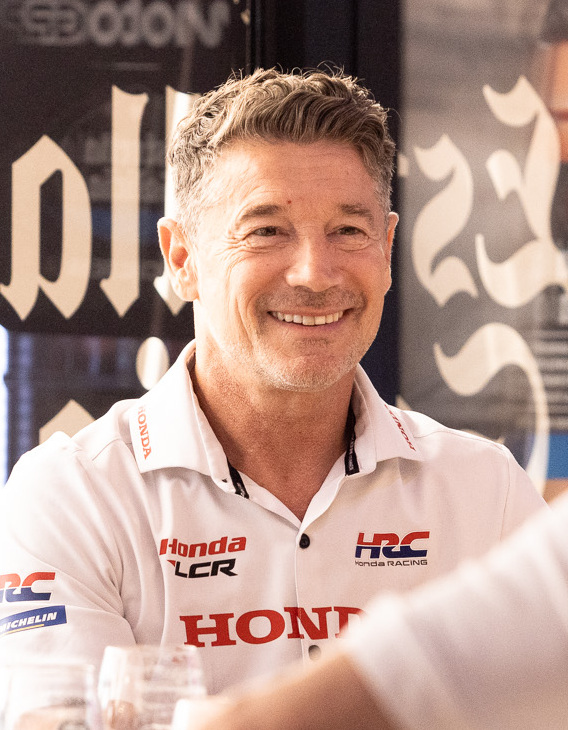
- Cecchinello at the 2026 German Grand Prix
- Nationality: Italian
- Born: 21 October 1969 (age 57); Venice, Italy
Motorcycle racing career statistics
Grand Prix motorcycle racing
Active years	1993 - 1994, 1996 - 2003
First race	1993 125cc Australian Grand Prix
Last race	2003 125cc Valencia Grand Prix
First win	1998 125cc Madrid Grand Prix
Last win	2003 125cc Italian Grand Prix
Team(s)	Aprilia, Honda
Championships	0
Starts / Wins / Podiums / Poles / F. laps / Points; 149 / 7 / 12 / 3 / 0 / 914

Lucio Cecchinello (born 21 October 1969) is an Italian former professional motorcycle racer who manages his own motorcycle racing team. He competed in Grand Prix motorcycle racing from 1993 to 2003. In 1996, he founded the LCR Team, initially competing in the 125cc class.

== Early life ==
Cecchinello was born in Venice, Italy.

== Racing career ==
For most of Cecchinello's life, he had an interest in racing. Not long after he got his license, he took his savings earned thanks to his summer jobs and, with the help of his father Luciano, he bought a Honda NS125 starting his dream to become a professional racer.

When Cecchinello was sixteen years old, he got a job as a mechanic. Eventually, he was working as a mechanic for Team Italia, which was involved in the European Championship.

When Cecchinello turned eighteen, he got the approval of his father to begin racing, and in 1989, made his debut as rider in the Italian Sports Production Championship riding a Honda 125 NSR. At his third race, on Monza race track, Cecchinello gained his first victory followed by further victories that gave him the Italian Runner-up champion title, behind Max Biaggi, in the Italian Sport Production Championship of 1989.

In 1991, Cecchinello made his debut in the 125 cc European Championship with Team Italia, finishing tenth overall. Two years later, he earned his European Runner-up award in the 125 cc class, and in 1993, he made his debut in the World Championship. The following year, the GIVI team offered Cecchinello the opportunity to race in the MotoGP, riding a Honda RS 125cc, during which he scored his first points in a World Championship. In 1995, Team Pileri gave Cecchinello the chance to race with a Honda 125 KIT in the European Championship. Cecchinello won eight races out of the 11 included in the calendar, becoming the official European Champion.

In 1996, Cecchinello created his own racing team for the World Championship in the 125 class (LCR Team – Lucio Cecchinello Racing). He acted as a racer and a team manager, and scored in the top ten several times.

Cecchinello had his first victory at the 125cc World Championship at Jarama race track in Spain in 1998: During the same season, his teammate was Japanese rider Noboru Ueda. in both 2001 and 2002, Cecchinello finished the 125cc Championship in the fourth position overall, aboard the Aprilia RS125. His team participated in the 250cc class several times, and later in the MotoGP class. Cecchinello lined up many riders such as Casey Stoner, Alex De Angelis, David Checa, Roberto Locatelli, Mattia Pasini, Randy De Puniet, Carlos Checa, Eugene Laverty and Toni Elias.

Before ending his racing career, Cecchinello realized one of his dreams taking the victory at the 2003 Italian Grand Prix at Mugello.

Since 2004, Cecchinello has been engaged full-time in managing the LCR Team. He is also member of the IRTA Committee (International Road Racing Teams Association), the association that represents the technical-sport advices of the Teams in the deal with the MotoGP organizers (Dorna) and the Institutions (FIM).

=== Career statistics ===
Season	Category	Starts	1st	2nd	3rd	Total	Poles	Bike	Points	Position
2003	125cc	16	2	1	-	3	-	Aprilia	112	9
2002	125cc	16	3	2	-	5	-	Aprilia	180	4
2001	125cc	16	1	2	1	4	1	Aprilia	156	4
2000	125cc	16	-	-	-	-	-	Honda	91	11
1999	125cc	16	-	2	2	4	3	Honda	108	9
1998	125cc	13	1	-	2	3	-	Honda	130	5
1997	125cc	15	-	-	-	-	-	Honda	73	14
1996	125cc	15	-	-	-	-	-	Honda	59	15
1994	125cc	14	-	-	-	-	-	Honda	5	30
1993	125cc	12	-	-	-	-	-	-	-	-

== LCR Team ==
Started in 1996, it began as a one-bike team, racing in 125cc class with a Honda bike. The team expanded into a two-bike team, and has been since 1998. In 2001, the team switched to using Aprilia machinery.

In 2002, the team ran extra bikes in 250cc, giving future MotoGP champion Casey Stoner his first full-time ride in the 250cc championship. Cecchinello retired after the 2003 season, but the team continues in the championship with Casey Stoner, and Randy de Puniet as the main rider.

In 2006, the team began competing in the MotoGP class with Honda machinery in the 250cc championship, also switching from Aprilia to Honda. The team employed Casey Stoner as their sole rider in MotoGP. They successfully reached their first podium and first pole with Stoner in their debut season. However, Stoner left at the end of the season to join the Ducati team. Veteran Spanish rider Carlos Checa was recruited to team LCR in 2007. From 2008 to 2010, the team's main rider was Randy de Puniet, who returned to the team after having been part of their 250cc campaign from 2003 to 2004. In 2011, the rider for Team LCR was Toni Elias. At the end of 2011, it was announced Moto2 World Champion Stefan Bradl had signed a two-year deal with the team.

Crutchlow started the 2015 season with CWM-LCR Honda by taking seventh-place finishes in Qatar and Austin. He achieved his first podium with the team, with a third-place result in Argentina after a last-lap pass on Andrea Iannone. In the process, Crutchlow achieved LCR's first podium since Stefan Bradl finished second at the 2013 United States Grand Prix. Crutchlow retired from each of the next three races on the calendar, in France, Italy and Catalunya, before a sixth-place finish in the Netherlands and adding a seventh-place finish in Germany. Crutchlow finished eighth in the championship.

Crutchlow won his first race at the wet 2016 Czech Republic GP. This win ended a 35-year dry spell, as the last win by a British rider in the top flight was Barry Sheene at the 1981 Swedish Grand Prix. He won the Australian GP, his first dry win. He became the first British person to win the Australian Grand Prix. He ended the year with 141 points, finishing seventh in the championship.

Crutchlow crashed at out at the season opener in Qatar, but rallied at the second race in Argentina to take a podium in third place. He followed this up with two top five finishes in his next three races to produce a solid start to the season. He extended his contract with LCR and Honda until 2019. For the 2020, Takaaki Nakagami joined the team and rode alongside Cal Crutchlow in the team. A year marked by the pandemic, it was a difficult one for the LCR. In 2021, Alex Marquez jumped into the team as Nakagami's teammate, after Cal Crutchlow's decision of retirement at the end of 2020. Spaniard Marquez and Japanese Nakagami were teammates again in 2022. In 2023, another Spanish rider, Alex Rins, has joined the team as Nakagami's teammate.
