= Alex Hofmann =

German motorcycle racer

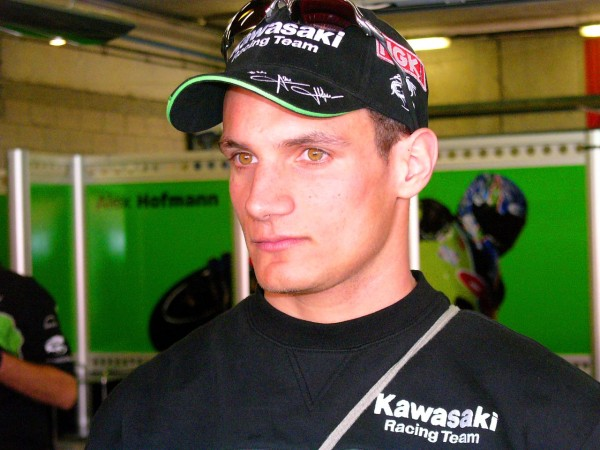
- Hofmann in 2005
- Nationality: German
- Born: 25 May 1980 (age 46); Mindelheim, West Germany
Motorcycle racing career statistics
Grand Prix motorcycle racing
Active years	1997 - 2007
First race	1997 125cc German Grand Prix
Last race	2007 MotoGP Portuguese Grand Prix
Team(s)	Yamaha, Honda, TSR-Honda, Aprilia, Kawasaki, Ducati
Championships	0
Starts / Wins / Podiums / Poles / F. laps / Points; 106 / 0 / 0 / 0 / 0 / 315

Alexander Hofmann (born 25 May 1980) is a retired Grand Prix motorcycle racer, who now works on German television coverage of the sport. He is nicknamed 'the Hoff' in English-speaking countries, a nod to David Hasselhoff.

== Early years ==
Hofmann successfully raced in Motocross in his early teens, before entering the German 125cc championship for the first time in 1995, and the European series alongside it a year later. In 1997, he was runner-up in the German series, and also started the German 125cc World Championship race as a wild card.

In 1998, Hofmann moved up to 250cc, winning every race in the German championship and also winning the European title, as well as coming tenth in a one-off in the 250cc World Championship. He was the first German to achieve both titles in his first season in the 250 cc class. Inspired by his childhood idol Loris Capirossi, he started with starting number 66. From 1999 to 2001, Hofmann was a regular in this series, although without taking a podium finish, and missing eight races in 2000 due to injury.

== MotoGP ==
Hofmann started 2002 without a ride, but made his MotoGP debut as a stand-in rider for Garry McCoy at the WCM Red Bull team, also filling in for Loris Capirossi for Sito Pons' team. He was hired to be Kawasaki's test rider role in 2003. In two starts, he scored points both times. He and Shinya Nakano replaced McCoy and Andrew Pitt as full-time racers in 2004. The next two years were difficult, mainly due to injuries, partly through his love of Motocross. Points were rare and Kawasaki chose Randy de Puniet for 2006 over Hofmann.

In 2006, Hofmann joined the D'Antin Pramac team, riding on a 2006 customer version of the works Ducati alongside José Luis Cardoso. When their factory rider Sete Gibernau was injured at the Circuit de Catalunya (a race in which Hofmann finished eighth, helped by three riders not starting the resumption of the race), Hofmann was appointed as his replacement for the next two races, before returning to D'Antin for his home race at Sachsenring, dropping out early.

In 2007, Hofmann remained with D'Antin, alongside the veteran Alex Barros. Fifth place at Le Mans took him to tenth in the championship after five rounds, ahead of reigning champion Nicky Hayden. He was a strong eighth at Assen. Preparation for his home round at the Sachsenring were hampered by a hand injury suffered when a friend closed a car door onto it, but he scored minor points in the race. He injured his hand in practice at Mazda Raceway Laguna Seca. He was replaced at Mazda Raceway Laguna Seca by Chaz Davies and by Iván Silva at Brno. He returned to racing at Misano but he was fired by the team following the Portuguese Grand Prix, after pulling out of the race while in with a chance of scoring points, due to a lack of motivation, in what would be his final World Championship start.

== Personal life ==
Hofmann's girlfriend is called Romina Rados. He loves action sports such as skiing and BMX bikes. At 1.80m, he is tall for a motorcycle racer. His favourite food is Italian. He has a two children, a son called Travis (b. 2010) and a daughter called Sienna (b. 2014).

Hofmann is fluent in German, English, French, Spanish and Italian.

After his racing career, Hofmann started working as MotoGP co-commentator alongside German commentator Edgar Mielke for the German TV station Sport1 in 2009, where his knowledge from his own racing career and multilingualism prove helpful as a pit and grid reporter. He remained there until the end of 2014 when Eurosport acquired the rights for the MotoGP for the 2015 season. Alex Hofmann also switched to Eurosport and also worked there as a pit lane reporter. In the spring of the following year, he left the channel, citing technical and personnel setbacks in his reporting.

When there was no place available for Hofmann on a MotoGP bike in the 2008 season, Aprilia hired Hofmann as a development and test rider for the new RSV4 superbike. If his performance was sufficient, it was planned that he would start as an Aprilia factory rider in the Superbike World Championship from 2009. However, this hope was dashed when Shinya Nakano, who had switched from the MotoGP class to the Superbike World Championship, received a contract with Aprilia and started for the Italians alongside Max Biaggi in 2009. The German remained a test rider for the manufacturer from Noale. After his contract expired, he moved to KTM in 2015 to help prepare the company's entry into MotoGP in 2017 as a test rider.

Since 2016, Hofmann has worked for the Austrian TV station ServusTV as a racing expert and co-commentates alongside Austrian commentator Christian Brugger at the Motorcycle World Championship races. The Broadcast were available to the German audience again so the Team at ServusTV became a mixture of Austrian and German personnel. Due to his foreign language skills, he is often deployed in the starting grid and interviews the riders immediately before the start. Stefan Bradl serves as Hofmann's additional co-commentator and stand-in. Occasionally fellow GP ex-riders Thomas Lüthi and Sandro Cortese also appear on segments, sometimes due to their involvement in the paddock or replacement expert when Bradl did race and test for HRC and KTM. After the COVID-19 pandemic, ServusTV announced withdrawal to broadcast their frequencies to Germany, focusing solely on the Austrian market. Ultimately, a subsidiary station was formed as DF1 that inherited the rights was formed just in time before the subsequent season with the whole cast and crew retained.

Hofmann has also occasionally been called in for Florian König during Formula 1 broadcasts on the German TV channel RTL. Furthermore, Hofmann joined RTL2, RTL Nitro and Sport1 for the 24h Nürburgring Endurance Events in recent years, after his active rider career ended in the late 2010s. In 2016, he was among those broadcasting members who gained a world record as the longest continuous sports broadcast at a length at over 25 hours and 50 minutes. The following him and the broadcasting team expanded the duration of that record to 26 hours and 20 minutes. His knowledge and linguistical versatility helped him to establish a strong recurring role in motorsport coverage.

== Career statistics ==
=== By season ===
Seas	Class	Moto	Team	Race	Win	Pod	Pole	FLap	Pts	Plcd
1997	125cc	Yamaha TZ125	Castor Kapital Racing	1	0	0	0	0	2	28th
1998	250cc	Honda NSR250	Racing Factory	1	0	0	0	0	6	29th
1999	250cc	Honda NSR250	Racing Factory	16	0	0	0	0	51	16th
2000	250cc	Aprilia RSV 250	Racing Factory	9	0	0	0	0	12	25th
2001	250cc	Aprilia RSV 250	Racing Factory	15	0	0	0	0	55	12th
2002	MotoGP	Yamaha YZR500	Red Bull Yamaha WCM	2	0	0	0	0	11	22nd
2002	MotoGP	Honda NSR500	West Honda Pons	2	0	0	0	0	11	22nd
2003	MotoGP	Kawasaki Ninja ZX-RR	Kawasaki Racing Team	5	0	0	0	0	8	23rd
2004	MotoGP	Kawasaki Ninja ZX-RR	Kawasaki Racing Team	16	0	0	0	0	51	15th
2005	MotoGP	Kawasaki Ninja ZX-RR	Kawasaki Racing Team	10	0	0	0	0	24	19th
2006	MotoGP	Ducati Desmosedici GP5	Pramac d'Antin	14	0	0	0	0	30	17th
2006	MotoGP	Ducati Desmosedici GP6	Ducati Marlboro Team	3	0	0	0	0	30	17th
2007	MotoGP	Ducati Desmosedici GP7	Pramac d'Antin	12	0	0	0	0	65	13th
Total				**106**	**0**	**0**	**0**	**0**	**315**	

=== By class ===
Class	Season(s)	1st Grand Prix	1st Podium	1st Win	Race	Win	Pod	Pole	FLap	Pts	WCh
125cc	1997	1997 Germany	N/A	N/A	1	0	0	0	0	2	0
250cc	1998–2001	1998 Germany	N/A	N/A	41	0	0	0	0	124	0
MotoGP	2002–2007	2002 Catalunya	N/A	N/A	64	0	0	0	0	189	0
Total	1997-2007				**106**	**0**	**0**	**0**	**0**	**315**	**0**

==== Races by year ====
(key) (Races in bold indicate pole position, races in italics indicate fastest lap)

Year	Class	Bike	1	2	3	4	5	6	7	8	9	10	11	12	13	14	15	16	17	18	Pos	Pts
1997	125cc	Yamaha	MAL	JPN	SPA	ITA	AUT	FRA	NED	IMO	GER; 14	BRA	GBR	CZE	CAT	IND	AUS				28th	2
1998	250cc	Honda	JPN	MAL	SPA	ITA	FRA	MAD	NED	GBR	GER; 10	CZE	IMO	CAT	AUS	ARG					29th	6
1999	250cc	TSR-Honda	MAL; 17	JPN; 18	SPA; 15	FRA; 8	ITA; 16	CAT; 11	NED; 11	GBR; 13	GER; 9	CZE; Ret	IMO; 17	VAL; 10	AUS; 13	RSA; 13	BRA; 12	ARG; 10			16th	51
2000	250cc	Aprilia	RSA; Ret	MAL; 10	JPN; 15	SPA; 17	FRA; 18	ITA; Ret	CAT	NED	GBR	GER	CZE; 19	POR; 11	VAL; 18	BRA; DNS	PAC	AUS			25th	12
2001	250cc	Aprilia	JPN; 12	RSA; 10	SPA; 11	FRA; 11	ITA; 18	CAT; 9	NED; 12	GBR; 9	GER; 7	CZE; Ret	POR; Ret	VAL; Ret	PAC; 17	AUS; Ret	MAL; 8	BRA; 17			12th	55
2002	MotoGP	Yamaha	JPN	RSA	SPA	FRA	ITA	CAT; Ret	NED; 11												22nd	11
2002	MotoGP	Honda								GBR; 17	GER; 10	CZE	POR	BRA	PAC	MAL	AUS	VAL			22nd	11
2003	MotoGP	Kawasaki	JPN	RSA	SPA; 16	FRA	ITA; 14	CAT	NED; 10	GBR	GER; 17	CZE; 19	POR	BRA	PAC	MAL	AUS	VAL			23rd	8
2004	MotoGP	Kawasaki	RSA; Ret	SPA; 13	FRA; Ret	ITA; 14	CAT; 11	NED; 13	BRA; 11	GER; 10	GBR; 19	CZE; 13	POR; 13	JPN; 10	QAT; 9	MAL; Ret	AUS; 13	VAL; 11			15th	51
2005	MotoGP	Kawasaki	SPA; 11	POR	CHN	FRA	ITA; 12	CAT; 17	NED; Ret	USA; 12	GBR; 8	GER; Ret	CZE; 15	JPN; Ret	MAL	QAT	AUS	TUR	VAL; 14		19th	24
2006	MotoGP	Ducati	SPA; 15	QAT; 15	TUR; 16	CHN; 15	FRA; 13	ITA; Ret	CAT; 10	NED; 12	GBR; 13	GER; Ret	USA; 14	CZE; 16	MAL; 15	AUS; 13	JPN; 16	POR; 11	VAL; Ret		17th	30
2007	MotoGP	Ducati	QAT; 11	SPA; DSQ	CHN; 9	TUR; 9	FRA; 5	ITA; 11	CAT; 13	GBR; 9	NED; 8	GER; 9	USA; DNS	CZE	RSM; 11	POR; Ret	JPN	AUS	MAL	VAL	13th	65

=== Superbike World Championship ===
==== Races by year ====
Year	Make	1		2		3		4		5		6		7		8		9		10		11		12		13		Pos.	Pts
Year	Make	R1	R2	R1	R2	R1	R2	R1	R2	R1	R2	R1	R2	R1	R2	R1	R2	R1	R2	R1	R2	R1	R2	R1	R2	R1	R2	Pos.	Pts
2002	Kawasaki	SPA	SPA	AUS	AUS	RSA	RSA	JPN	JPN	ITA	ITA	GBR	GBR	GER; 13	GER; 15	SMR	SMR	USA	USA	GBR	GBR	GER	GER	NED	NED	ITA	ITA	34th	4
