= Jeremy McWilliams =

Northern Irish motorcycle racer

- McWilliams riding an Aprilia RSW-2 500 in 2000
- Born: 4 April 1964 (age 62); Glengormley, Northern Ireland
Motorcycle racing career statistics
MotoGP World Championship
Active years	1993–1996, 2000, 2002–2005, 2007
Manufacturers	Yamaha, Aprilia, Team KR, Ilmor
Championships	0
Starts / Wins / Podiums / Poles / F. laps / Points; 118 / 0 / 2 / 2 / 0 / 300
Moto2 World Championship
Active years	2014
Manufacturers	Taylor Made
Championships	0
2014 championship position	NC (0 pts)
Starts / Wins / Podiums / Poles / F. laps / Points; 1 / 0 / 0 / 0 / 0 / 0
250cc World Championship
Active years	1997–1999, 2001
Manufacturers	Honda, TSR, Aprilia
Championships	0
Starts / Wins / Podiums / Poles / F. laps / Points; 58 / 1 / 4 / 1 / 0 / 384

Jeremy Michael McWilliams (born 4 April 1964 in Glengormley, County Antrim), is a Northern Irish motorcycle road racer. McWilliams became ineligible for mainstream racing after the 2014 season due to his age exceeding the 50-year-old cutoff point, but has continued to ride occasionally in events not controlled by the FIM.

McWilliams is involved in development work for motorcycle and tyre manufacturers, such as KTM, and also in coaching young riders through his Masterclass race schools.

== Career ==
=== Early career (1993–2001) ===
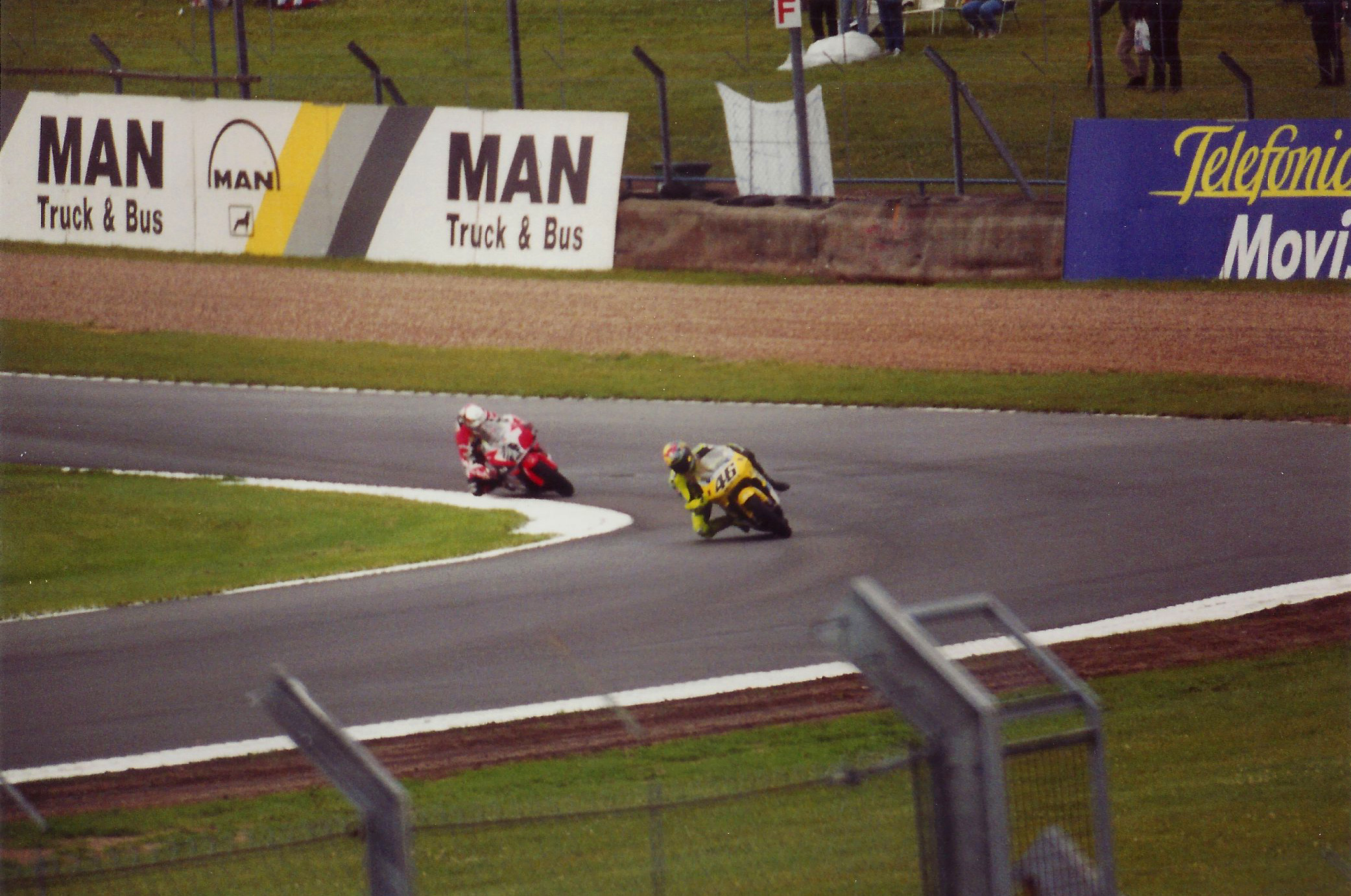
McWilliams following Valentino Rossi at the 2000 British Grand Prix

Between 1993 and 2001, McWilliams rode in the 250cc and 500cc classes. He took two podiums in the 500cc class in 2000, at the Italian GP and the British GP. The following year he won the 250cc race in the Netherlands aboard an Aprilia.

=== MotoGP and British Superbikes (2002–2007) ===
In 2002 and 2003, McWilliams rode for Kenny Roberts' Team KR in MotoGP aboard the Proton KR bike. In a surprising performance, he took pole position at the 2002 Australian GP, riding a three-cylinder two-stroke bike against the much more competitive four strokes. His best race result over these two years was sixth at the 2003 French GP.

In 2004, he rode the much-maligned Aprilia RS Cube in MotoGP, alongside Shane Byrne. His best finish was 12th place, which he achieved three times, amidst a season where he was frequently hurt due to the vicious nature of the bike. He later claimed to have experienced broken ribs and a dislocated collarbone, amongst other injuries, during that season.

For 2005, McWilliams was contracted to return to the Kenny Roberts KR team, who would be receiving engine support from KTM. However, Dorna stepped in later and revoked the contract on the insistence that Shane Byrne be given the ride. This came as a huge disappointment to McWilliams, leaving him scrambling to find a ride late into the off-season.

Instead, McWillilams spent 2005 racing in the British Superbike Championship on a Honda, but finished outside the top-ten in the end of year standings, partly due to a shoulder injury suffered during the season.

Later in the year, McWilliams did get a chance to fulfill his initial plans of riding the for Team Roberts in MotoGP. KTM withdrew their support for the team one day before the Czech Crand Prix at Brno, refusing to supply engines. This left the team in a difficult situation, as they were contractually obliged to fill their position on the grid, but had no engines to use. Furthermore, the team's sole rider, Shane Byrne, was technically contracted to KTM and unable to ride any other bike, leaving Byrne unable to compete and Team Roberts with no rider.

With less than 24 hours notice, McWilliams found himself competing at Brno in the Czech Republic, racing on the Team Roberts Proton V5 bike the team used in 2004. The weekend started promisingly, as McWilliams immediately started posting lap times as much as 1.5 seconds quicker than what the bike had posted the previous year. However, McWilliams ended up being forced to retire from the race due to an engine sensor failure, causing the throttle to stick open.

Following the race, McWilliams expressed interest in competing in the rest of the season. Team Roberts subsequently announced that they would not be able to make it to the flyaway races due to their sudden loss of funds from the now terminated KTM deal, but hoped to show at the season-ending race in Valencia with McWilliams. For reasons unknown, the team and McWilliams failed to show.

For 2007, McWilliams was contracted to race in the MotoGP series for the newly founded Ilmor team, despite a heavy crash in testing in late 2006. He had to miss the first race of the season in Qatar, due to another crash, near the end of the Losail International Circuit. After this round the team suspended its racing operations and did not return.

=== Later years (2012–present) ===
In 2012, McWilliams participated in the North West 200 races, where he scored a second place in the Super-Twin event. Riding for the KMR Racing Team, McWilliams finished second behind his fellow Irishman, Ryan Farquhar.

In 2013, McWilliams had a supporting role in the film Under the Skin, starring Scarlett Johansson.

In 2014, McWilliams returned to Grand Prix racing at the age of 50 for a one-off wildcard ride in the Moto2 series at the British Grand Prix held at Silverstone. He finished in 29th place aboard a machine with American origins entered as Brough Superior, using the controlled-standard 600 cc four-cylinder Honda engine.

In 2022, McWilliams returned to road racing full time in the MotoAmerica King of Bagger Series with the Indian Motorcycle factory team alongside 2021 class Champion Tyler O’Hara. During the 2022 season, McWilliams was able to take his first win the series during the Daytona 200 weekend. For 2023, McWilliams remains on the Indian factory team alongside O'Hara in both the King of the Bagger and the Super Hooligan class.

Aged 62, he won the Supertwin/Sportbike race on a Yamaha at the 2026 North West 200 event, his fourth victory at the event.

== Career statistics ==
=== Grand Prix motorcycle racing ===
==== By season ====
Season	Class	Motorcycle	Team	Race	Win	Pod	Pole	FLap	Pts	Plcd
1993	500cc	Yamaha	Team Millar	13	0	0	0	0	17	22nd
1994	500cc	Yamaha	Team Millar	14	0	0	0	0	49	12th
1995	500cc	Harris-Yamaha	Team Millar	12	0	0	0	0	20	19th
1996	500cc	ROC Yamaha	QUB Team Optimum	15	0	0	0	0	26	16th
1997	250cc	Honda	QUB Team Optimum	14	0	0	0	0	73	10th
1998	250cc	TSR-Honda	QUB Team Optimum	14	0	1	0	0	87	9th
1999	250cc	Aprilia	QUB Team Optimum	14	0	1	1	0	83	10th
2000	500cc	Aprilia	Blu Aprilia Team	16	0	2	1	0	76	14th
2001	250cc	Aprilia	MS Aprilia Racing	16	1	2	0	0	141	6th
2002	MotoGP	Proton	Proton Team KR	16	0	0	1	0	59	14th
2003	MotoGP	Proton	Proton Team KR	16	0	0	0	0	27	18th
2004	MotoGP	Aprilia	MS Aprilia Racing	15	0	0	0	0	26	19th
2005	MotoGP	Proton	Team Roberts	1	0	0	0	0	0	NC
2007	MotoGP	Ilmor GP	Ilmor GP	0	0	0	0	0	0	NC
2014	Moto2	Taylor Made	Brough Superior Racing	1	0	0	0	0	0	NC
Total				**177**	**1**	**6**	**3**	**0**	**684**	

==== By class ====
Class	Season	1st GP	1st Pod	1st Win	Race	Win	Podiums	Pole	FLap	Pts	WChmp
250cc	1997–1999, 2001	1997 Malaysia	1998 Germany	2001 Netherlands	58	1	4	1	0	384	0
500cc	1993–1996, 2000	1993 Australia	2000 Italy		70	0	2	1	0	188	0
MotoGP	2002–2005, 2007	2002 Japan			48	0	0	1	0	112	0
Moto2	2014	2014 Great Britain			1	0	0	0	0	0	0
Total	1993–2005, 2007, 2014				**177**	**1**	**6**	**3**	**0**	**684**	**0**

==== Races by year ====
(key) (Races in bold indicate pole position)

Year	Class	Bike	1	2	3	4	5	6	7	8	9	10	11	12	13	14	15	16	17	18	Pos.	Pts
1993	500cc	Yamaha	AUS; Ret	MAL; DNS	JPN; Ret	SPA; Ret	AUT; 20	GER; Ret	NED; Ret	EUR; 11	RSM; 13	GBR; Ret	CZE; 16	ITA; 19	USA; 12	FIM; 11					22nd	17
1994	500cc	Yamaha	AUS; 17	MAL; 14	JPN; 13	SPA; 11	AUT; 16	GER; Ret	NED; Ret	ITA; 15	FRA; 8	GBR; 10	CZE; 10	USA; 9	ARG; 9	EUR; 12					12th	49
1995	500cc	Harris-Yamaha	AUS; DNS	MAL; 14	JPN; Ret	SPA; 11	GER; Ret	ITA; Ret	NED; 18	FRA; 7	GBR; Ret	CZE; 16	BRA; 12	ARG; Ret	EUR; 17						19th	20
1996	500cc	ROC Yamaha	MAL; 14	INA; 12	JPN; 13	SPA; 14	ITA; 16	FRA; 11	NED; 14	GER; Ret	GBR; Ret	AUT; 14	CZE; 14	IMO; Ret	CAT; 12	BRA; Ret	AUS; Ret				16th	26
1997	250cc	Honda	MAL; 9	JPN; 16	SPA; 9	ITA; 9	AUT; Ret	FRA; 11	NED; 9	IMO; 7	GER; 8	BRA; 10	GBR	CZE; Ret	CAT; 11	INA; 10	AUS; 10				10th	73
1998	250cc	TSR-Honda	JPN; 10	MAL; 7	SPA; Ret	ITA; Ret	FRA; 7	MAD; 9	NED; 12	GBR; 7	GER; 2	CZE; 4	IMO; Ret	CAT; Ret	AUS; Ret	ARG; 6					9th	87
1999	250cc	Aprilia	MAL; 7	JPN; Ret	SPA; 7	FRA; 11	ITA; 4	CAT; 6	NED; 3	GBR; 6	GER; Ret	CZE; 8	IMO; 13	VAL; Ret	**AUS**; Ret	RSA	BRA; Ret	ARG; DNS			10th	83
2000	500cc	Aprilia	RSA; Ret	MAL; 10	JPN; 8	SPA; Ret	FRA; 12	ITA; 3	CAT; 12	NED; Ret	GBR; 3	GER; Ret	CZE; 9	POR; 11	VAL; Ret	BRA; Ret	PAC; 14	**AUS**; 8			14th	76
2001	250cc	Aprilia	JPN; 8	RSA; 6	SPA; 10	FRA; 7	ITA; Ret	CAT; 6	NED; 1	GBR; Ret	GER; Ret	CZE; Ret	POR; 5	VAL; 5	PAC; 3	AUS; 4	MAL; 5	BRA; 5			6th	141
2002	MotoGP	Proton KR	JPN; Ret	RSA; Ret	SPA; 16	FRA; 10	ITA; Ret	CAT; 12	NED; Ret	GBR; Ret	GER; 7	CZE; 7	POR; 9	BRA; Ret	PAC; 10	MAL; 12	**AUS**; 10	VAL; 8			14th	59
2003	MotoGP	Proton KR	JPN; Ret	RSA; Ret	SPA; 12	FRA; 6	ITA; Ret	CAT; Ret	NED; Ret	GBR; Ret	GER; 12	CZE; Ret	POR; 19	BRA; 16	PAC; Ret	MAL; 17	AUS; 11	VAL; 12			18th	27
2004	MotoGP	Aprilia	RSA; 16	SPA; Ret	FRA; 13	ITA; 16	CAT; DNS	NED; 15	BRA; 14	GER; 12	GBR; 16	CZE; 14	POR; 12	JPN; 12	QAT; Ret	MAL; 15	AUS; 14	VAL; 13			19th	26
2005	MotoGP	Proton KR	SPA	POR	CHN	FRA	ITA	CAT	NED	USA	GBR	GER	CZE; Ret	JPN	MAL	QAT	AUS	TUR	VAL		NC	0
2007	MotoGP	Ilmor GP	QAT; DNS	SPA	TUR	CHN	FRA	ITA	CAT	GBR	NED	GER	USA	CZE	RSM	POR	JPN	AUS	MAL	VAL	NC	0
2014	Moto2	Taylor Made	QAT	AME	ARG	SPA	FRA	ITA	CAT	NED	GER	INP	CZE	GBR; 29	RSM	ARA	JPN	AUS	MAL	VAL	NC	0

=== Superbike World Championship ===
==== Races by year ====
(key) (Races in bold indicate pole position) (Races in italics indicate fastest lap)

Year	Make	1		2		3		4		5		6		7		8		9		10		11		12		13		Pos.	Pts
Year	Make	R1	R2	R1	R2	R1	R2	R1	R2	R1	R2	R1	R2	R1	R2	R1	R2	R1	R2	R1	R2	R1	R2	R1	R2	R1	R2	Pos.	Pts
1993	Ducati	IRL	IRL	GER	GER	SPA	SPA	SMR	SMR	AUT	AUT	CZE	CZE	SWE	SWE	MAL	MAL	JPN	JPN	NED	NED	ITA	ITA	GBR; 10	GBR; Ret	POR	POR	48th	6
