= 2000 Italian motorcycle Grand Prix =

(Italy) 2000 Italian Grand Prix
Race details
- Race 6 of 16 races in the 2000 Grand Prix motorcycle racing season
- Date: 28 May 2000
- Official name: Gran Premio Cinzano d'Italia
- Location: Autodromo Internazionale del Mugello
- Course: Permanent racing facility; 5.245 km (3.259 mi)

500cc
Pole position
- Rider: (Brazil) Alex Barros
- Time: 1:52.811
Fastest lap
- Rider: (Italy) Loris Capirossi
- Time: 1:53.885 on lap 2
Podium
- First: (Italy) Loris Capirossi
- Second: (Spain) Carlos Checa
- Third: (United Kingdom) Jeremy McWilliams

250cc
Pole position
- Rider: (Italy) Marcellino Lucchi
- Time: 1:53.928
Fastest lap
- Rider: (Japan) Shinya Nakano
- Time: 1:54.462 on lap 16
Podium
- First: (Japan) Shinya Nakano
- Second: (France) Olivier Jacque
- Third: (Japan) Daijiro Kato

125cc
Pole position
- Rider: (Italy) Roberto Locatelli
- Time: 1:58.923
Fastest lap
- Rider: (Italy) Roberto Locatelli
- Time: 2:00.029 on lap 2
Podium
- First: (Italy) Roberto Locatelli
- Second: (Italy) Mirko Giansanti
- Third: (Japan) Masao Azuma

The 2000 Italian motorcycle Grand Prix was the sixth race of the 2000 Grand Prix motorcycle racing season. It took place on 28 May 2000 at the Autodromo Internazionale del Mugello.

== 500 cc classification ==
Pos.	No.	Rider	Team	Manufacturer	Laps	Time/Retired	Grid	Points
1	65	(Italy) Loris Capirossi	Emerson Honda Pons	Honda	23	44:04.220	4	25
2	7	(Spain) Carlos Checa	Marlboro Yamaha Team	Yamaha	23	+2.876	5	20
3	99	(United Kingdom) Jeremy McWilliams	Blu Aprilia Team	Aprilia	23	+8.041	11	16
4	9	(Japan) Nobuatsu Aoki	Telefónica Movistar Suzuki	Suzuki	23	+9.631	8	13
5	6	(Japan) Norick Abe	Antena 3 Yamaha d'Antin	Yamaha	23	+9.939	14	11
6	2	(United States) Kenny Roberts Jr.	Telefónica Movistar Suzuki	Suzuki	23	+10.127	6	10
7	55	(France) Régis Laconi	Red Bull Yamaha WCM	Yamaha	23	+18.288	9	9
8	8	(Japan) Tadayuki Okada	Repsol YPF Honda Team	Honda	23	+18.401	7	8
9	4	(Italy) Max Biaggi	Marlboro Yamaha Team	Yamaha	23	+26.661	2	7
10	5	(Spain) Sete Gibernau	Repsol YPF Honda Team	Honda	23	+27.668	15	6
11	17	(Netherlands) Jurgen van den Goorbergh	Rizla Honda	TSR-Honda	23	+28.147	17	5
12	46	(Italy) Valentino Rossi	Nastro Azzurro Honda	Honda	23	+49.625	3	4
13	25	(Spain) José Luis Cardoso	Maxon Dee Cee Jeans	Honda	23	+1:15.622	16	3
14	18	(Belgium) Sébastien Le Grelle	Tecmas Honda Elf	Honda	22	+1 lap	20	2
15	15	(Japan) Yoshiteru Konishi	FCC TSR	TSR-Honda	22	+1 lap	19	1
Ret	31	(Japan) Tetsuya Harada	Blu Aprilia Team	Aprilia	21	Retirement	10	
Ret	24	(Australia) Garry McCoy	Red Bull Yamaha WCM	Yamaha	18	Accident	13	
Ret	10	(Brazil) Alex Barros	Emerson Honda Pons	Honda	17	Accident	1	
Ret	1	(Spain) Àlex Crivillé	Repsol YPF Honda Team	Honda	8	Accident	12	
Ret	23	(United Kingdom) Callum Ramsay	Sabre Sport	Honda	5	Retirement	22	
Ret	11	(Spain) José David de Gea	Proton Team KR	Modenas KR3	2	Retirement	18	
Ret	43	(Italy) Paolo Tessari	Team Paton	Paton	1	Retirement	21	

== 250 cc classification ==
Pos.	No.	Rider	Manufacturer	Laps	Time/Retired	Grid	Points
1	56	(Japan) Shinya Nakano	Yamaha	21	40:30.142	2	25
2	19	(France) Olivier Jacque	Yamaha	21	+0.786	3	20
3	74	(Japan) Daijiro Kato	Honda	21	+15.233	8	16
4	13	(Italy) Marco Melandri	Aprilia	21	+15.334	5	13
5	21	(Italy) Franco Battaini	Aprilia	21	+34.753	9	11
6	4	(Japan) Tohru Ukawa	Honda	21	+38.003	6	10
7	14	(Australia) Anthony West	Honda	21	+1:01.597	23	9
8	8	(Japan) Naoki Matsudo	Yamaha	21	+1:01.839	13	8
9	10	(Spain) Fonsi Nieto	Yamaha	21	+1:02.068	22	7
10	11	(Italy) Ivan Clementi	Aprilia	21	+1:07.095	15	6
11	18	(Malaysia) Shahrol Yuzy	Yamaha	21	+1:17.005	18	5
12	23	(France) Julien Allemand	Yamaha	21	+1:21.649	21	4
13	42	(Spain) David Checa	TSR-Honda	21	+1:38.389	27	3
14	15	(United Kingdom) Adrian Coates	Aprilia	20	+1 lap	17	2
Ret	37	(Italy) Luca Boscoscuro	Aprilia	20	Accident	16	
Ret	30	(Spain) Alex Debón	Aprilia	18	Retirement	11	
Ret	34	(Italy) Marcellino Lucchi	Aprilia	11	Accident	1	
Ret	9	(Argentina) Sebastián Porto	Yamaha	11	Retirement	25	
Ret	54	(Spain) David García	Aprilia	7	Accident	24	
Ret	26	(Germany) Klaus Nöhles	Aprilia	4	Accident	7	
Ret	24	(United Kingdom) Jason Vincent	Aprilia	3	Accident	14	
Ret	77	(United Kingdom) Jamie Robinson	Aprilia	3	Accident	10	
Ret	31	(Spain) Lucas Oliver	Yamaha	3	Accident	26	
Ret	6	(Germany) Ralf Waldmann	Aprilia	2	Accident	4	
Ret	16	(Sweden) Johan Stigefelt	TSR-Honda	0	Retirement	19	
Ret	22	(France) Sébastien Gimbert	TSR-Honda	0	Retirement	28	
Ret	41	(Netherlands) Jarno Janssen	TSR-Honda	0	Retirement	20	
Ret	66	(Germany) Alex Hofmann	Aprilia	0	Accident	12	
WD	25	(France) Vincent Philippe	TSR-Honda		Withdrew		

== 125 cc classification ==
Pos.	No.	Rider	Manufacturer	Laps	Time/Retired	Grid	Points
1	4	(Italy) Roberto Locatelli	Aprilia	20	40:36.753	1	25
2	32	(Italy) Mirko Giansanti	Honda	20	+6.212	13	20
3	3	(Japan) Masao Azuma	Honda	20	+6.258	12	16
4	17	(Germany) Steve Jenkner	Honda	20	+6.493	10	13
5	23	(Italy) Gino Borsoi	Aprilia	20	+6.494	5	11
6	5	(Japan) Noboru Ueda	Honda	20	+6.821	6	10
7	1	(Spain) Emilio Alzamora	Honda	20	+6.932	11	9
8	21	(France) Arnaud Vincent	Aprilia	20	+7.038	7	8
9	12	(France) Randy de Puniet	Aprilia	20	+7.214	15	7
10	8	(Italy) Gianluigi Scalvini	Aprilia	20	+20.644	3	6
11	22	(Spain) Pablo Nieto	Derbi	20	+20.945	14	5
12	15	(San Marino) Alex de Angelis	Honda	20	+38.950	20	4
13	26	(Italy) Ivan Goi	Honda	20	+38.971	19	3
14	39	(Czech Republic) Jaroslav Huleš	Italjet	20	+39.002	25	2
15	18	(Spain) Antonio Elías	Honda	20	+40.284	23	1
16	29	(Spain) Ángel Nieto Jr.	Honda	20	+40.484	24	
17	19	(Italy) Alessandro Brannetti	Honda	20	+40.522	21	
18	53	(San Marino) William de Angelis	Aprilia	20	+40.757	17	
19	35	(Germany) Reinhard Stolz	Honda	20	+41.099	22	
20	11	(Italy) Max Sabbatani	Honda	20	+41.186	16	
21	51	(Italy) Marco Petrini	Aprilia	20	+42.010	18	
22	24	(United Kingdom) Leon Haslam	Italjet	20	+1:16.769	27	
23	10	(Spain) Adrián Araujo	Honda	20	+1:39.715	28	
24	66	(Italy) Alex Baldolini	Honda	19	+1 lap	29	
Ret	9	(Italy) Lucio Cecchinello	Honda	19	Accident	8	
Ret	54	(San Marino) Manuel Poggiali	Derbi	19	Accident	9	
Ret	16	(Italy) Simone Sanna	Aprilia	9	Retirement	2	
Ret	67	(Switzerland) Marco Tresoldi	Honda	8	Retirement	26	
Ret	41	(Japan) Youichi Ui	Derbi	4	Retirement	4	

== Championship standings after the race (500cc) ==
Below are the standings for the top five riders and constructors after round six has concluded.

Riders' Championship standings

Pos.	Rider	Points
1	(United States) Kenny Roberts Jr.	100
2	(Spain) Carlos Checa	100
3	(Japan) Norifumi Abe	65
4	(Italy) Loris Capirossi	63
5	(Australia) Garry McCoy	61

Constructors' Championship standings

Pos.	Constructor	Points
1	(Japan) Yamaha	130
2	(Japan) Honda	108
3	(Japan) Suzuki	103
4	(Italy) Aprilia	41
5	(Japan) TSR-Honda	29

- Note: Only the top five positions are included for both sets of standings.

Previous race: 2000 French Grand Prix	FIM Grand Prix World Championship; 2000 season	Next race: 2000 Catalan Grand Prix
Previous race: 1999 Italian Grand Prix	Italian Grand Prix	Next race: 2001 Italian Grand Prix
