= 1999 Catalan motorcycle Grand Prix =

(Catalonia) 1999 Catalan Grand Prix
Race details
- Race 6 of 16 races in the 1999 Grand Prix motorcycle racing season
- Date: 20 June 1999
- Official name: Gran Premi Marlboro de Catalunya
- Location: Circuit de Catalunya
- Course: Permanent racing facility; 4.727 km (2.937 mi)

500cc
Pole position
- Rider: (Netherlands) Jurgen vd Goorbergh
- Time: 1:46.076
Fastest lap
- Rider: (Spain) Sete Gibernau
- Time: 1:46.858 on lap 7
Podium
- First: (Spain) Àlex Crivillé
- Second: (Japan) Tadayuki Okada
- Third: (Spain) Sete Gibernau

250cc
Pole position
- Rider: (Japan) Tohru Ukawa
- Time: 1:48.199
Fastest lap
- Rider: (Italy) Valentino Rossi
- Time: 1:48.278 on lap 2
Podium
- First: (Italy) Valentino Rossi
- Second: (Japan) Tohru Ukawa
- Third: (Italy) Franco Battaini

125cc
Pole position
- Rider: (Italy) Roberto Locatelli
- Time: 1:52.491
Fastest lap
- Rider: (Japan) Noboru Ueda
- Time: 1:52.813 on lap 13
Podium
- First: (France) Arnaud Vincent
- Second: (Spain) Emilio Alzamora
- Third: (Italy) Marco Melandri

The 1999 Catalan motorcycle Grand Prix was the sixth round of the 1999 Grand Prix motorcycle racing season. It took place on 20 June 1999 at the Circuit de Catalunya.

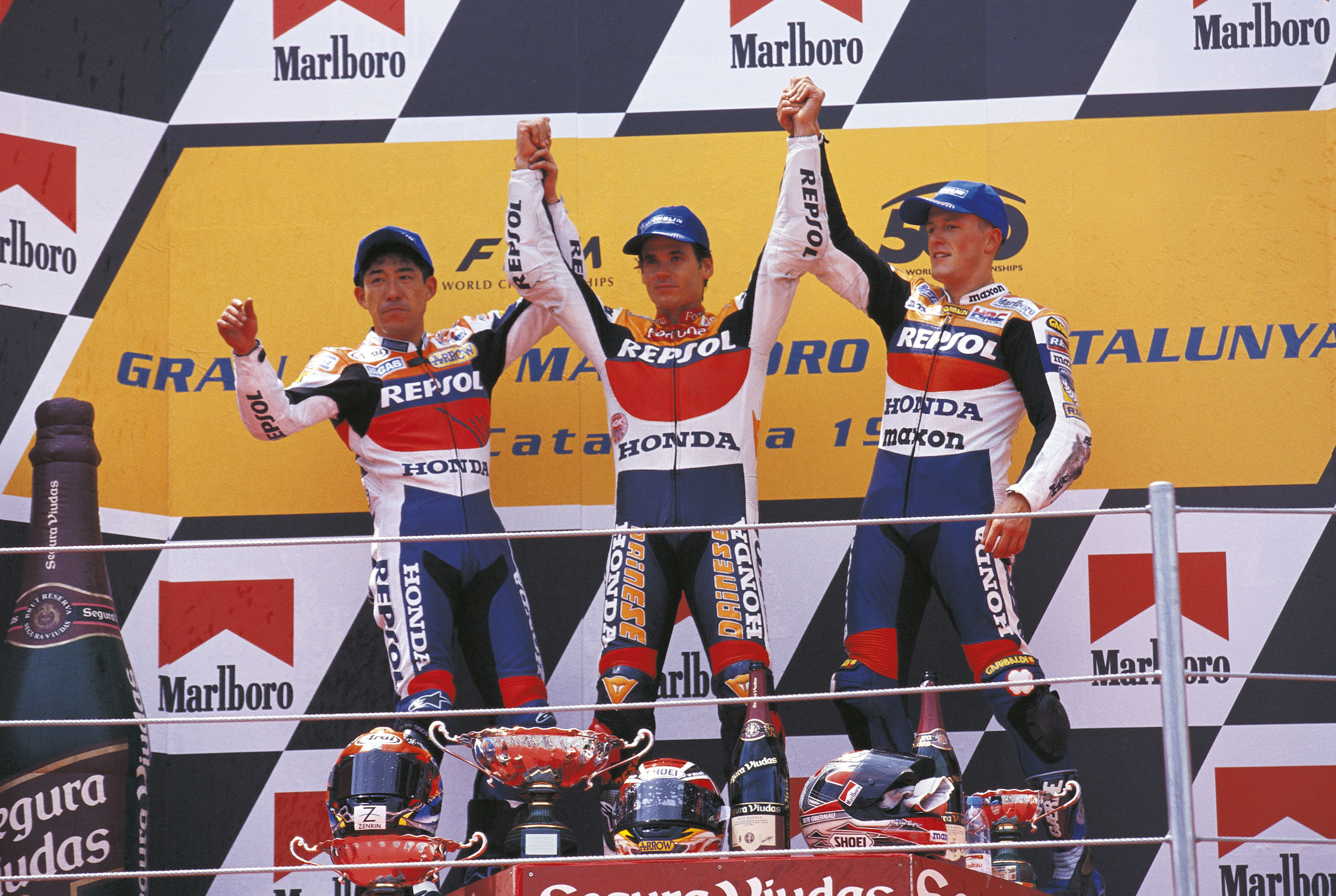
Tadayuki Okada, Àlex Crivillé and Sete Gibernau, celebrating an all-Honda podium after finishing second, first and third in the 500cc race.

== 500 cc classification ==
Pos.	No.	Rider	Team	Manufacturer	Laps	Time/Retired	Grid	Points
1	3	(Spain) Àlex Crivillé	Repsol Honda Team	Honda	25	44:55.701	4	25
2	8	(Japan) Tadayuki Okada	Repsol Honda Team	Honda	25	+0.061	8	20
3	15	(Spain) Sete Gibernau	Repsol Honda Team	Honda	25	+4.467	3	16
4	31	(Japan) Tetsuya Harada	Aprilia Grand Prix Racing	Aprilia	25	+20.216	12	13
5	14	(Spain) Juan Borja	Movistar Honda Pons	Honda	25	+21.087	17	11
6	10	(United States) Kenny Roberts Jr.	Suzuki Grand Prix Team	Suzuki	25	+22.006	7	10
7	4	(Spain) Carlos Checa	Marlboro Yamaha Team	Yamaha	25	+23.637	11	9
8	17	(Netherlands) Jurgen van den Goorbergh	Team Biland GP1	MuZ Weber	25	+23.711	1	8
9	19	(United States) John Kocinski	Kanemoto Honda	Honda	25	+23.899	10	7
10	26	(Japan) Haruchika Aoki	FCC TSR	TSR-Honda	25	+29.845	15	6
11	9	(Japan) Nobuatsu Aoki	Suzuki Grand Prix Team	Suzuki	25	+37.387	16	5
12	25	(Spain) José Luis Cardoso	Team Maxon TSR	TSR-Honda	25	+1:08.539	18	4
13	18	(Germany) Markus Ober	Dee Cee Jeans Racing Team	Honda	25	+1:08.712	21	3
14	22	(France) Sébastien Gimbert	Tecmas Honda Elf	Honda	25	+1:08.840	19	2
Ret	12	(France) Jean-Michel Bayle	Proton KR Modenas	Modenas KR3	24	Accident	5	
Ret	55	(France) Régis Laconi	Red Bull Yamaha WCM	Yamaha	21	Accident	12	
Ret	6	(Japan) Norifumi Abe	Antena 3 Yamaha d'Antin	Yamaha	17	Accident	6	
Ret	2	(Italy) Max Biaggi	Marlboro Yamaha Team	Yamaha	11	Accident	2	
Ret	5	(Brazil) Alex Barros	Movistar Honda Pons	Honda	8	Accident	9	
Ret	21	(United Kingdom) Michael Rutter	Millar Honda	Honda	8	Retirement	22	
Ret	69	(United Kingdom) James Whitham	Proton KR Modenas	Modenas KR3	8	Retirement	20	
Ret	43	(Italy) Paolo Tessari	Team Paton	Paton	7	Retirement	23	
Ret	7	(Italy) Luca Cadalora	Team Biland GP1	MuZ Weber	6	Retirement	14	
WD	11	(New Zealand) Simon Crafar	Red Bull Yamaha WCM	Yamaha		Withdrew		

== 250 cc classification ==
Pos.	No.	Rider	Manufacturer	Laps	Time/Retired	Grid	Points
1	46	(Italy) Valentino Rossi	Aprilia	23	41:47.806	2	25
2	4	(Japan) Tohru Ukawa	Honda	23	+0.258	1	20
3	21	(Italy) Franco Battaini	Aprilia	23	+12.755	4	16
4	56	(Japan) Shinya Nakano	Yamaha	23	+13.085	3	13
5	44	(Italy) Roberto Rolfo	Aprilia	23	+25.429	7	11
6	9	(United Kingdom) Jeremy McWilliams	Aprilia	23	+29.320	11	10
7	7	(Italy) Stefano Perugini	Honda	23	+45.343	9	9
8	49	(Japan) Naoki Matsudo	Yamaha	23	+45.563	10	8
9	12	(Argentina) Sebastián Porto	Yamaha	23	+50.947	12	7
10	37	(Italy) Luca Boscoscuro	TSR-Honda	23	+51.482	16	6
11	66	(Germany) Alex Hofmann	TSR-Honda	23	+51.673	13	5
12	11	(Japan) Tomomi Manako	Yamaha	23	+51.742	14	4
13	36	(Japan) Masaki Tokudome	TSR-Honda	23	+1:11.473	15	3
14	22	(Spain) Lucas Oliver	Yamaha	23	+1:26.093	18	2
15	41	(Netherlands) Jarno Janssen	TSR-Honda	23	+1:37.071	19	1
16	58	(Argentina) Matías Ríos	Aprilia	22	+1 lap	27	
17	59	(Spain) Jesús Pérez	Honda	22	+1 lap	29	
18	69	(Spain) Daniel Ribalta	Yamaha	22	+1 lap	28	
Ret	34	(Italy) Marcellino Lucchi	Aprilia	17	Retirement	5	
Ret	60	(Spain) Alex Debón	Honda	15	Retirement	21	
Ret	62	(Spain) Álvaro Molina	Honda	11	Retirement	25	
Ret	15	(Spain) David García	Yamaha	6	Retirement	24	
Ret	24	(United Kingdom) Jason Vincent	Honda	4	Retirement	8	
Ret	23	(France) Julien Allemand	TSR-Honda	3	Retirement	22	
Ret	16	(Sweden) Johan Stigefelt	Yamaha	1	Retirement	17	
Ret	10	(Spain) Fonsi Nieto	Yamaha	0	Retirement	23	
Ret	14	(Australia) Anthony West	TSR-Honda	0	Retirement	20	
Ret	6	(Germany) Ralf Waldmann	Aprilia	0	Retirement	6	
Ret	70	(Spain) Iván Silva	Honda	0	Retirement	26	

== 125 cc classification ==
Pos.	No.	Rider	Manufacturer	Laps	Time/Retired	Grid	Points
1	21	(France) Arnaud Vincent	Aprilia	22	41:47.749	6	25
2	7	(Spain) Emilio Alzamora	Honda	22	+0.011	12	20
3	13	(Italy) Marco Melandri	Honda	22	+0.340	4	16
4	6	(Japan) Noboru Ueda	Honda	22	+0.547	11	13
5	5	(Italy) Lucio Cecchinello	Honda	22	+1.262	2	11
6	15	(Italy) Roberto Locatelli	Aprilia	22	+1.625	1	10
7	1	(Japan) Kazuto Sakata	Honda	22	+2.097	13	9
8	16	(Italy) Simone Sanna	Honda	22	+20.426	3	8
9	12	(France) Randy de Puniet	Aprilia	22	+20.595	16	7
10	8	(Italy) Gianluigi Scalvini	Aprilia	22	+20.859	15	6
11	44	(Italy) Alessandro Brannetti	Aprilia	22	+20.959	14	5
12	23	(Italy) Gino Borsoi	Aprilia	22	+22.768	9	4
13	9	(France) Frédéric Petit	Aprilia	22	+22.812	21	3
14	32	(Italy) Mirko Giansanti	Aprilia	22	+29.025	19	2
15	26	(Italy) Ivan Goi	Honda	22	+42.860	22	1
16	18	(Germany) Reinhard Stolz	Honda	22	+49.937	25	
17	56	(Spain) Adrián Araujo	Honda	22	+1:00.610	26	
18	57	(Spain) Luis Costa	Honda	22	+1:32.793	29	
Ret	20	(Germany) Bernhard Absmeier	Aprilia	21	Retirement	23	
Ret	55	(Spain) Antonio Elías	Honda	21	Retirement	27	
Ret	54	(San Marino) Manuel Poggiali	Aprilia	10	Retirement	24	
Ret	22	(Spain) Pablo Nieto	Derbi	8	Accident	17	
Ret	53	(Spain) Emilio Delgado	Honda	8	Retirement	30	
Ret	4	(Japan) Masao Azuma	Honda	7	Retirement	8	
Ret	10	(Spain) Jerónimo Vidal	Aprilia	6	Retirement	7	
Ret	41	(Japan) Youichi Ui	Derbi	5	Retirement	5	
Ret	17	(Germany) Steve Jenkner	Aprilia	5	Accident	10	
Ret	29	(Spain) Ángel Nieto, Jr.	Honda	5	Accident	20	
Ret	11	(Italy) Max Sabbatani	Honda	2	Accident	18	
Ret	43	(Spain) Víctor Carrasco	Honda	2	Accident	28	

== Championship standings after the race (500cc) ==
Below are the standings for the top five riders and constructors after round six has concluded.

Riders' Championship standings

Pos.	Rider	Points
1	(Spain) Àlex Crivillé	129
2	(United States) Kenny Roberts Jr.	74
3	(Spain) Sete Gibernau	72
4	(Japan) Tadayuki Okada	68
5	(Spain) Carlos Checa	65

Constructors' Championship standings

Pos.	Constructor	Points
1	(Japan) Honda	136
2	(Japan) Yamaha	96
3	(Japan) Suzuki	74
4	(Italy) Aprilia	45
5	(Germany) MuZ Weber	25

- Note: Only the top five positions are included for both sets of standings.

Previous race: 1999 Italian Grand Prix	FIM Grand Prix World Championship; 1999 season	Next race: 1999 Dutch TT
Previous race: 1998 Catalan Grand Prix	Catalan Grand Prix	Next race: 2000 Catalan Grand Prix
