= Kawasaki Ninja ZX-RR =

Racing motorcycle model by Kawasaki (2002-2009)

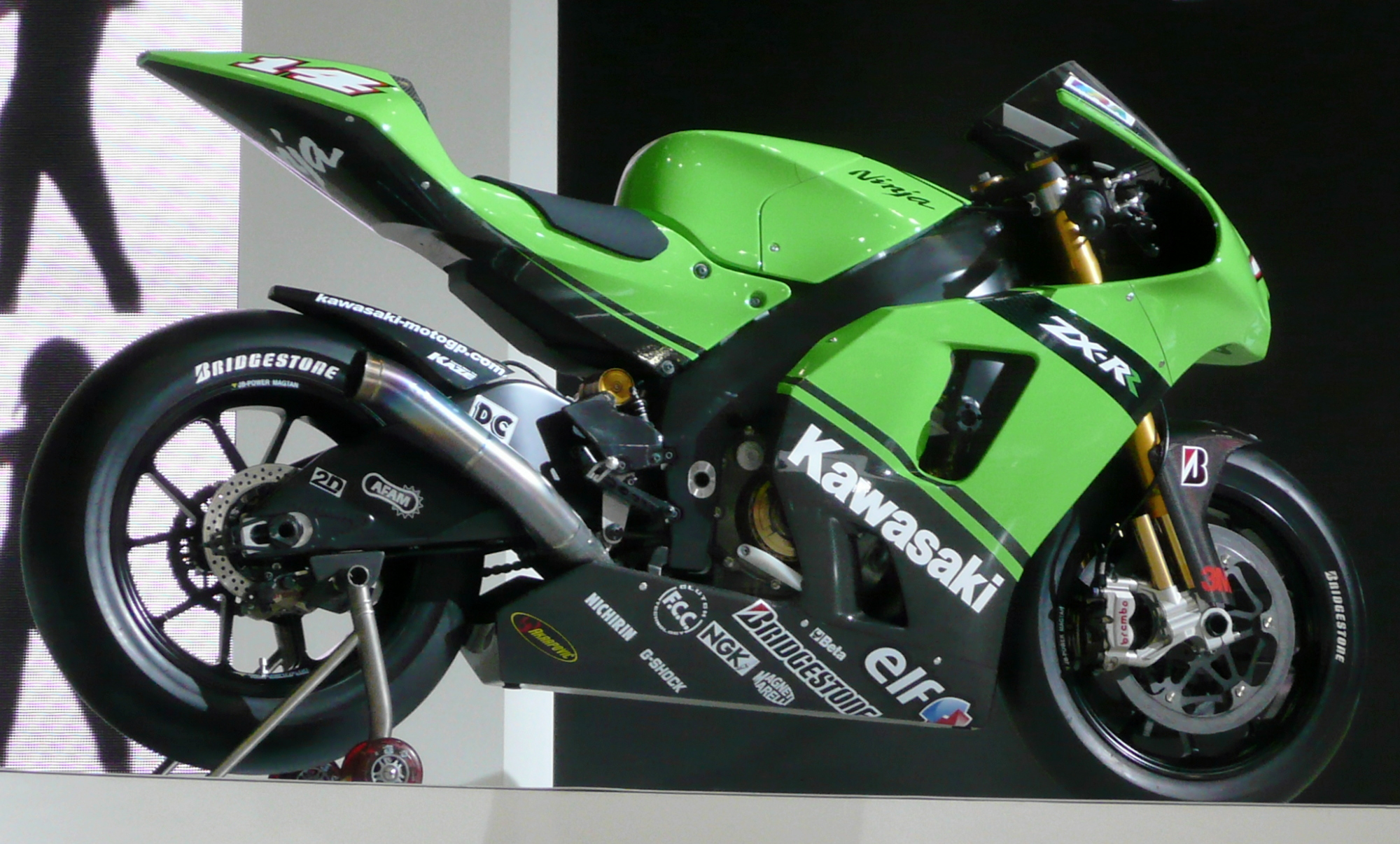
- Manufacturer: Kawasaki
- Production: 2002–2009
- Predecessor: Kawasaki KR500
- Class: MotoGP
- Engine: 798cc four-stroke inline-four DOHC (2007–2008)

The Ninja ZX-RR is a race bike from Kawasaki, which raced in the MotoGP world championship until 2009. The bike made its debut towards the end of the 2002 MotoGP season with riders Andrew Pitt (Australia) and Akira Yanagawa (Japan).

== Racing history ==
In 2004, Shinya Nakano joined the Kawasaki team and got the ZX-RR's first podium with a third place at the Japanese Grand Prix. The bike earned second place over the next three years: in 2005 with Olivier Jacque at the Chinese Grand Prix; in 2006 with Nakano at the Dutch TT; and in 2007 with Randy de Puniet at the Japanese Grand Prix.

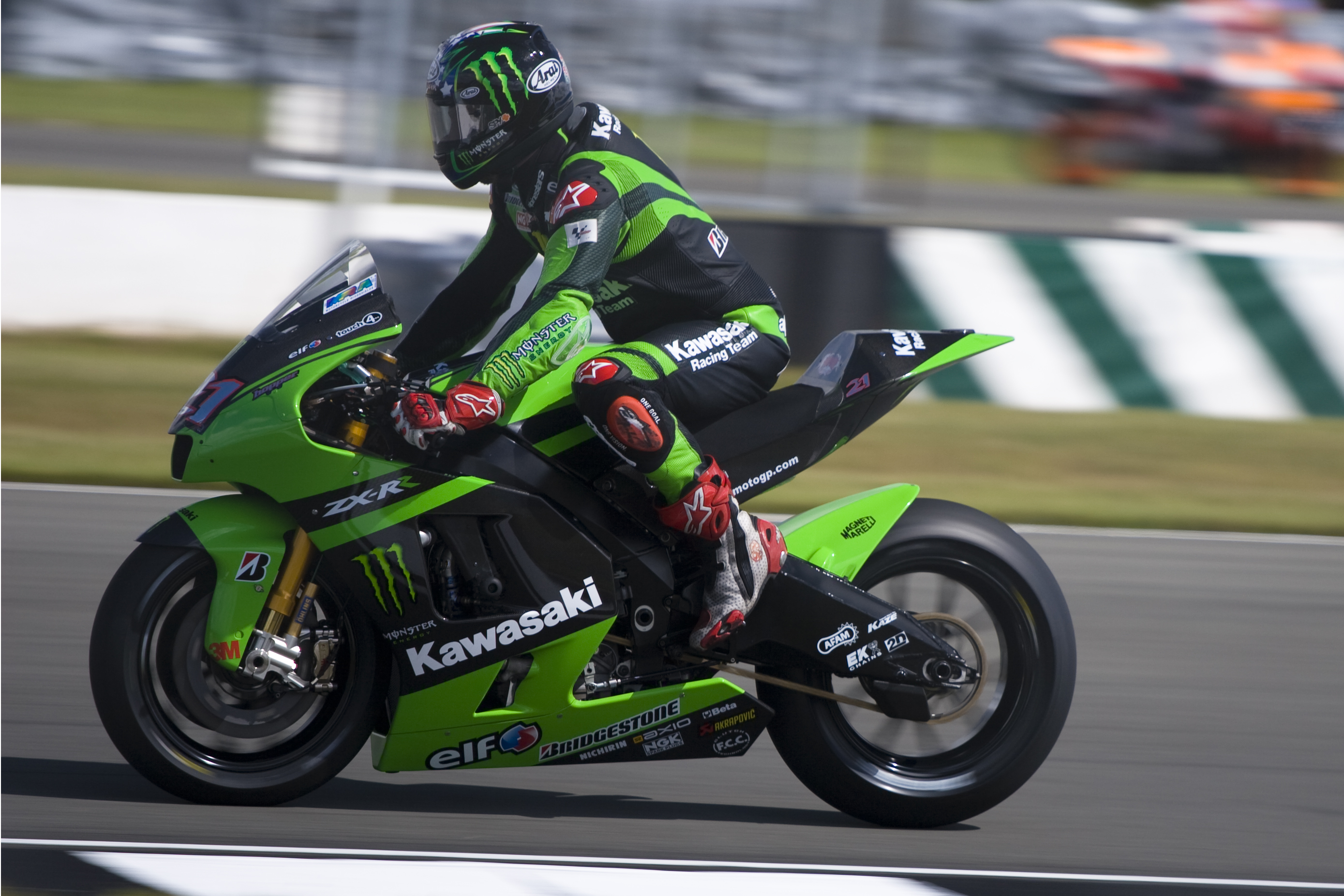
2008 Kawasaki Ninja ZX-RR

The ZX-RR struggled in 2008, with the best results being two fifth-place finishes from John Hopkins in Portugal and Anthony West in Brno. Hopkins and West blamed both a lack of feeling in the front end and rear traction on corner exit, a complaint Marco Melandri also had in 2009. During the 2008 season, Kawasaki announced its retirement from the MotoGP world championship.

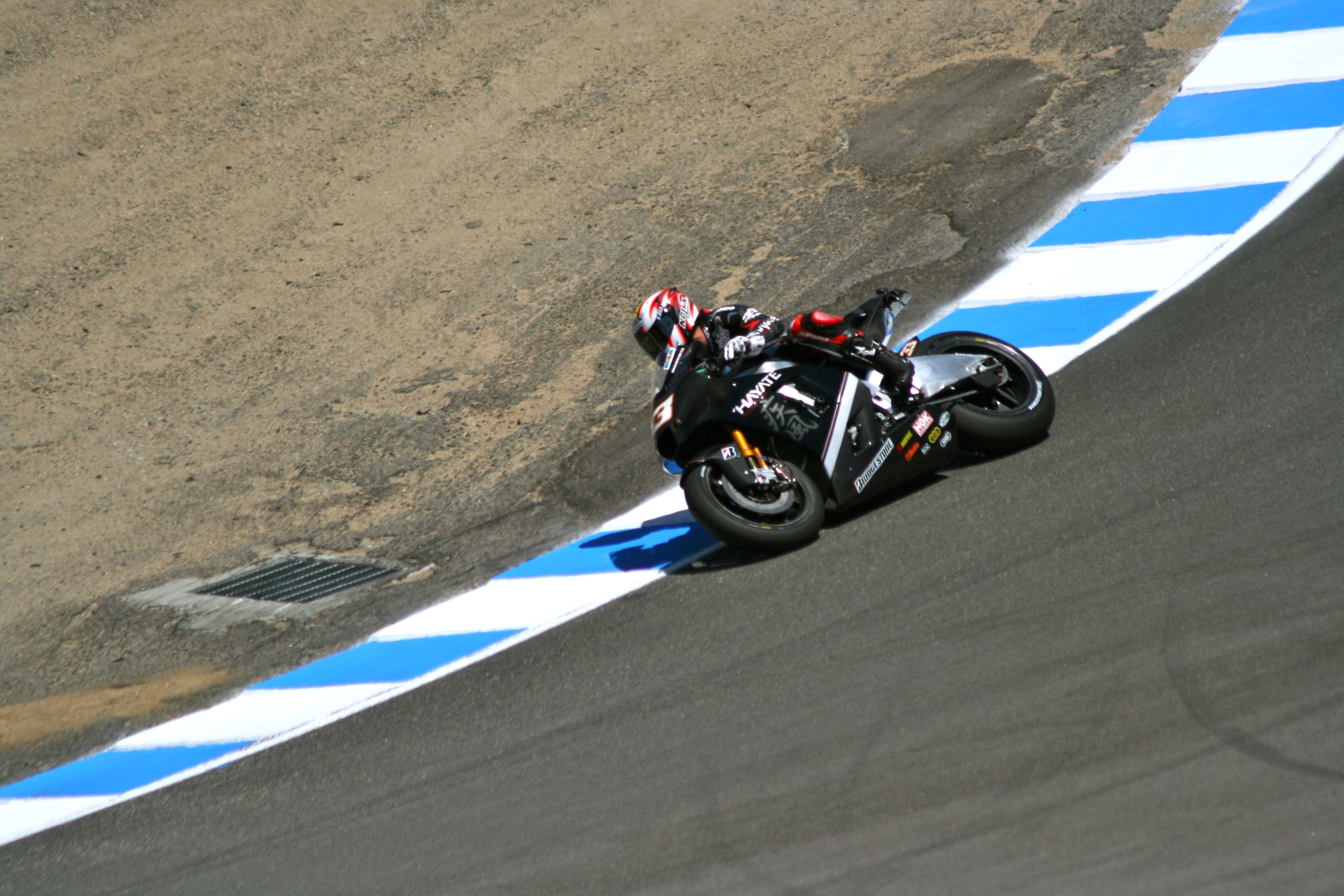
2009-present Kawasaki Ninja ZX-RR

Forward Racing took over the ZX-RR as the Hayate racing team and recruited Marco Melandri to ride during the 2009 season; Melandri won fourth place. At the end of the season, Hayate withdrew from MotoGP. The bike, with some changes, has been ridden a few times since its last official appearance in 2014 under the name Avintia GP14.

== Riders ==
Year	Rider	Rider	Rider	Rider	Rider	Refs
2002	(Australia) Andrew Pitt	(Japan) Akira Yanagawa				
2003	(Germany) Alex Hofmann	(Australia) Garry McCoy	(Australia) Andrew Pitt	(Japan) Akira Yanagawa		
2004	(Germany) Alex Hofmann	(Japan) Shinya Nakano				
2005	(Germany) Alex Hofmann	(France) Olivier Jacque	(Japan) Shinya Nakano			
2006	(France) Randy de Puniet	(Japan) Shinya Nakano				
2007	(France) Randy de Puniet	(France) Olivier Jacque	(Spain) Fonsi Nieto	(Australia) Anthony West	(Japan) Akira Yanagawa	
2008	(United Kingdom) / (United States) Jamie Hacking	(United States) John Hopkins	(Australia) Anthony West			
2009	(Italy) Marco Melandri					

=== As the Avintia GP14 ===
Year	Rider	Rider	Refs
2013	(Spain) Héctor Barberá		
2014	(Spain) Héctor Barberá	(France) Mike Di Meglio	

== Specifications ==
	2002-2006	2007–2008
Engine
Type	Kawasaki four-stroke	
Configuration	Inline four-cylinder	
Induction System	DOHC, four valves per cylinder	DOHC Pneumatic system, four valves per cylinder
Displacement	988 cc	798 cc
Bore x stroke	79mm x 50.4mm	74mm x 46.4mm
Fuel	Elf Moto 4S GP 102 RON unleaded	
Lubricants	Elf Vent Vert Saeryoku 冴強 10W-50 Kawasaki genuine racing oil	
Lubrication	Wet sump	
Fuel System	Electronic Fuel Injection	
Exhaust System	Four-into-two-into-one	Titanium, four-into-two-into-one
Maximum Power	In excess of 240 bhp (180 kW)	In excess of 200 bhp (150 kW)
Maximum Speed	In excess of 336.2 km/h (208.9 mph)	In excess of 342.2 km/h (212.6 mph)
Transmission
Gearbox	Six speed, cassette type	
Primary Drive	Gear	
Clutch	Dry multi-plate slipper clutch	
Final Drive	Chain	
Chassis
Frame	Aluminium twin-spar	
Front Suspension	Inverted telescopic forks	
Rear Suspension	Monoshock	Unit-trak Monoshock
Steering Damper	Hydraulic Adjustable	
Bodywork	Carbon Fibre	
Wheels	Front: 16.5 inch Rear: 16.5 inch	
Tires	Bridgestone	
Brakes
Front	2 x 314 mm carbon discs, 2 x radial mount, monoblock, four piston calipers	
Rear	1 x 203 mm ventilated steel disc, 1 x four piston caliper	1 x 200 mm ventilated steel disc, 1 x two piston caliper
Dimensions
Wheelbase	Variable	1,460 mm (57 in)
Overall Length	2,090 mm (82 in)	2,080 mm (82 in)
Castor (Rake/Trail)	Variable	
Seat Height	850 mm (33 in)	
Dry Weight	Over 145 kg (320 lb)	Over 148 kg (326 lb)
Fuel Capacity	22 L (4.8 imp gal; 5.8 US gal)	21 L (4.6 imp gal; 5.5 US gal)
Key Suppliers
	Fuel: Elf; Lubricants: Elf; Tires: Bridgestone; Brakes: Brembo; Exhaust System: Akrapovic; Data Acquisition System: 2D Datarecording; Suspension: Öhlins; Clutch: FCC; Spark Plugs: NGK; Sprockets: AFAM; Chain: EK	

== See also ==
- Honda RC212V
- Suzuki GSV-R
- Yamaha YZR-M1
- Aprilia RS Cube
- Ducati Desmosedici
