= Carlos Checa =

Spanish motorcycle racer

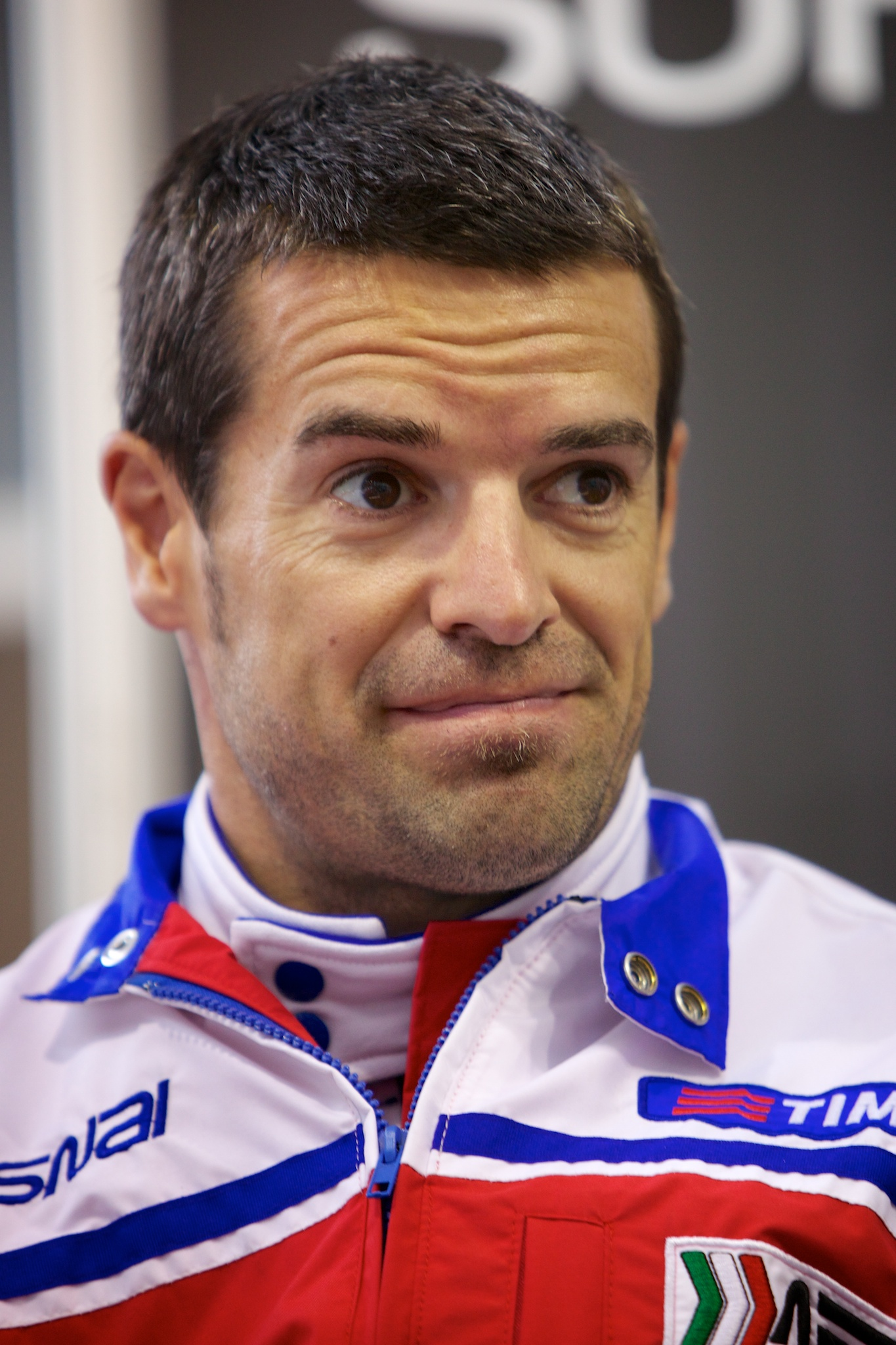
- Checa during the Silverstone round of the 2012 Superbike World Championship
- Nationality: Spanish
- Born: 15 October 1972 (age 54); Sant Fruitós de Bages, Province of Barcelona, Spain
- Website: carloscheca.com Twitter's profile
Motorcycle racing career statistics
MotoGP World Championship
Active years	1995–2007, 2010
Manufacturers	Honda, Ducati, Yamaha
Championships	0
2010 championship position	21st (1 pt)
Starts / Wins / Podiums / Poles / F. laps / Points; 194 / 2 / 24 / 3 / 5 / 1485
250cc World Championship
Active years	1993–1995
Manufacturers	Honda
Championships	0
1995 championship position	13th (45 pts)
Starts / Wins / Podiums / Poles / F. laps / Points; 27 / 0 / 0 / 0 / 0 / 108
125cc World Championship
Active years	1993
Manufacturers	Honda
Championships	0
1993 championship position	27th (9 pts)
Starts / Wins / Podiums / Poles / F. laps / Points; 1 / 0 / 0 / 0 / 0 / 9
Superbike World Championship
Active years	2008–2013
Manufacturers	Honda, Ducati
Championships	1 (2011)
2013 championship position	15th (80 pts)
Starts / Wins / Podiums / Poles / F. laps / Points; 150 / 24 / 49 / 10 / 30 / 1691.5

Carlos Checa Carrera (born 15 October 1972) is a Spanish former professional motorcycle road racer, best known for his Superbike World Championship title in 2011. Checa raced in 500cc and MotoGP for over a decade between 1995 and 2007, mostly on Honda and Yamaha machinery, and claimed two Grand Prix victories, despite not having full manufacturer support. He then moved to the Superbike World Championship with Honda for 2008, and he went on to claim 24 victories and a world championship. He has a younger brother, David Checa, who is also a motorcycle racer.

== Career ==
=== 125cc, 250cc, 500cc & MotoGP World Championship ===
Born in Sant Fruitós de Bages, Spain, Checa made his debut in 125cc and 250cc motorcycle racing in 1993 for Honda. In 1995, he moved up to the Blue Riband 500cc class as a replacement for Alberto Puig, a fellow Spaniard who broke both his legs in a horrifying crash in France. Checa shocked the paddock by being on the pace and nearly winning the Barcelona race.

Checa continued with the team until 1998, the year he suffered near fatal injuries with a crash at Donington Park's Craner Curves and was initially thought to have suffered only scrapes and bruises before complaining of pain. Hours later he had lost his vision, needed emergency surgery to remove his spleen and was listed in critical condition. He fought back to ride that year, missing just one race, before racing for Yamaha as Max Biaggi's teammate on two-strokes and four-strokes. He nearly won many races but had a habit of crashing after taking the lead. One such race was at Rio de Janeiro in 2002, when he stalled on the starting line, then rode through the field to take the lead only to crash a corner later.

Checa continued racing with the factory Yamaha team for the 2003 and 2004 seasons, before he moved to Marlboro Ducati in 2005. In 2006 he returned to the Tech 3 Yamaha team, proving much steadier than in previous years and comfortably beating teammate James Ellison, but was not much a threat to the rest of the field, as they were on Dunlop tyres. He struggled as the sole LCR Honda rider in 2007, with the 800cc Honda proving uncompetitive for many riders. At the Sachsenring, Checa got an updated frame, which other non-works Honda riders had found uncompetitive – this is believed to be due to Checa using the same Michelin tyres as the works team, the other Hondas being on Bridgestones.

Checa returned to the series in 2010, as replacement for Mika Kallio for the last two races of the season.

=== Superbike World Championship ===
For the 2008 season, Checa left MotoGP to join the Ten Kate Honda team in the Superbike World Championship as a replacement for 2007 champion James Toseland. At Valencia, he challenged Max Neukirchner for the win at the final corner, resulting in a collision which broke Neukirchner's collarbone. Checa's first two wins – following four podium finishes – both came in the meeting at Miller Motorsports Park in Salt Lake City on 1 June 2008. He did not reach the podium again, but consistent results elsewhere allowed him to finish fifth in the championship. He also won the Suzuka 8 Hours with teammate Ryuichi Kiyonari.

In 2009, Checa struggled to compete for much of the season, securing just four podium finishes and finishing seventh in the riders' standings, 32 points behind satellite Honda rider Leon Haslam. During the 2009 season, Ten Kate Honda announced that they would be downsizing their operation from three riders to just two. Both Checa and Ryuichi Kiyonari were released, with Jonathan Rea retained and Max Neukirchner joining the team from Suzuki.

In November 2009, Checa was confirmed as a rider at the Althea Ducati team, where he would race alongside Shane Byrne. He scored Althea's first win at the season opening meeting at Phillip Island, and was on course for victories in both races at Miller Motorsports Park in the United States before suffering mystery mechanical failures in both races. Checa went on to win the Italian round at Imola and finished the season in third place in the 2010 championship.

Checa dominated the opening round of the 2011 season, winning both races comfortably at Phillip Island on his Ducati 1098R. He won thirteen more times and was crowned the 2011 World Superbike Champion at the penultimate round at the Magny-Cours circuit in France, becoming the first Spaniard and only the third European rider from outside of the United Kingdom after Raymond Roche and Max Biaggi to have done so.

== Career statistics ==
=== Grand Prix motorcycle racing ===
==== By season ====
Season	Class	Motorcycle	Team	Number	Race	Win	Podium	Pole	FLap	Pts	Plcd	WCh
1993	125cc	Honda RS125R	M.C Manresa - Petrocat	63	1	0	0	0	0	9	27th	–
1993	250cc	Honda RS250R	Daytona - Pit Lane	38	6	0	0	0	0	9	23rd	–
1994	250cc	Honda RS250R	Givi Racing	23	14	0	0	0	0	54	12th	–
1995	250cc	Honda NSR250	Fortuna Honda Pons	12	7	0	0	0	0	45	13th	–
1995	500cc	Honda NSR500	Fortuna Honda Pons	12	5	0	0	0	1	26	16th	–
1996	500cc	Honda NSR500	Fortuna Honda Pons	24	14	1	3	0	1	124	8th	–
1997	500cc	Honda NSR500	MoviStar Honda Pons	8	15	0	3	0	1	119	8th	–
1998	500cc	Honda NSR500	MoviStar Honda Pons	8	11	1	3	1	1	139	4th	–
1999	500cc	Yamaha YZR500	Marlboro Yamaha Team	4	16	0	1	0	0	125	7th	–
2000	500cc	Yamaha YZR500	Marlboro Yamaha Team	7	16	0	4	0	0	155	6th	–
2001	500cc	Yamaha YZR500	Marlboro Yamaha Team	7	15	0	3	0	0	137	6th	–
2002	MotoGP	Yamaha YZR-M1	Marlboro Yamaha Team	7	16	0	4	1	1	141	5th	–
2003	MotoGP	Yamaha YZR-M1	Fortuna Yamaha Team	7	16	0	0	0	0	123	7th	–
2004	MotoGP	Yamaha YZR-M1	Gauloises Fortuna Yamaha	7	16	0	1	1	0	117	7th	–
2005	MotoGP	Ducati GP5	Ducati Marlboro Team	7	17	0	2	0	0	138	9th	–
2006	MotoGP	Yamaha YZR-M1	Tech 3 Yamaha	7	17	0	0	0	0	75	15th	–
2007	MotoGP	Honda RC212V	Honda LCR	7	18	0	0	0	0	65	14th	–
2010	MotoGP	Ducati GP10	Pramac Racing Team	71	2	0	0	0	0	1	21st	–
Total					**222**	**2**	**24**	**3**	**5**	**1602**		**0**

==== By class ====
Class	Seasons	1st GP	1st Pod	1st Win	Race	Win	Podiums	Pole	FLap	Pts	WChmp
125cc	1993	1993 Europe			1	0	0	0	0	9	0
250cc	1993–1995	1993 San Marino			27	0	0	0	0	108	0
500cc	1995–2001	1995 Britain	1996 Malaysia	1996 Catalunya	92	2	17	1	4	825	0
MotoGP	2002–2007, 2010	2002 Japan	2002 Japan		102	0	7	2	1	660	0
Total	1993–2007, 2010				**222**	**2**	**24**	**3**	**5**	**1602**	**0**

==== Races by year ====
(key) (Races in bold indicate pole position, races in italics indicate fastest lap)

Year	Class	Bike	1	2	3	4	5	6	7	8	9	10	11	12	13	14	15	16	17	18	Pos	Pts
1993	125cc	Honda	AUS	MAL	JPN	SPA	AUT	GER	NED	EUR; 7											27th	9
1993	250cc	Honda									RSM; 21	GBR; 25	CZE; Ret	ITA; 20	USA; 14	FIM; 9					23rd	9
1994	250cc	Honda	AUS; 14	MAL; 11	JPN; Ret	SPA; 11	AUT; Ret	GER; 14	NED; 11	ITA; 10	FRA; 13	GBR; 12	CZE; Ret	USA; 7	ARG; 10	EUR; 10					12th	54
1995	250cc	Honda	AUS; 4	MAL; DNS	JPN; Ret	SPA; Ret	GER; 7	ITA; 11	NED; 11	FRA; 4											13th	45
1995	500cc	Honda									GBR; Ret	CZE; 8	BRA; 7	ARG; 7	EUR; Ret						16th	26
1996	500cc	Honda	MAL; 3	INA; 5	JPN; 10	SPA; 10	ITA; DNS	FRA; Ret	NED; 11	GER; Ret	GBR; 12	AUT; 7	CZE; 8	IMO; 11	CAT; 1	BRA; 4	AUS; 3				8th	124
1997	500cc	Honda	MAL; 6	JPN; 6	SPA; Ret	ITA; Ret	AUT; 6	FRA; 2	NED; 2	IMO; 4	GER; Ret	BRA; Ret	GBR; Ret	CZE; Ret	CAT; 2	INA; 6	AUS; 10				8th	119
1998	500cc	Honda	JPN; 8	MAL; 2	**SPA**; 4	ITA; 4	FRA; 3	MAD; 1	NED; 5	GBR; DNS	GER	CZE; 7	IMO; 10	CAT; 6	AUS; DNS	ARG; 8					4th	139
1999	500cc	Yamaha	MAL; 2	JPN; 6	SPA; 10	FRA; 5	ITA; 7	CAT; 7	NED; Ret	GBR; Ret	GER; 4	CZE; Ret	IMO; Ret	VAL; 5	AUS; 4	RSA; 6	BRA; Ret	ARG; 4			7th	125
2000	500cc	Yamaha	RSA; 2	MAL; 2	JPN; 5	SPA; 2	FRA; 7	ITA; 2	CAT; Ret	NED; 5	GBR; 11	GER; 9	CZE; 11	POR; 12	VAL; 7	BRA; 15	PAC; 4	AUS; Ret			6th	155
2001	500cc	Yamaha	JPN; 10	RSA	SPA; 14	FRA; 2	ITA; Ret	CAT; 8	NED; Ret	GBR; 5	GER; 2	CZE; 7	POR; 4	VAL; 4	PAC; 7	AUS; 16	MAL; 10	BRA; 2			6th	137
2002	MotoGP	Yamaha	JPN; 3	RSA; 5	SPA; Ret	FRA; Ret	ITA; 4	CAT; 3	NED; 3	GBR; Ret	GER; 4	CZE; 5	**POR**; 2	BRA; Ret	PAC; 5	MAL; 7	AUS; 11	VAL; Ret			5th	141
2003	MotoGP	Yamaha	JPN; 10	RSA; 9	SPA; Ret	FRA; Ret	ITA; 8	CAT; 4	NED; 4	GBR; 6	GER; 8	CZE; 4	POR; 8	BRA; 9	PAC; Ret	MAL; 5	AUS; 8	VAL; 5			7th	123
2004	MotoGP	Yamaha	RSA; 10	SPA; 6	FRA; 2	ITA; Ret	CAT; 4	NED; 9	BRA; 10	GER; Ret	GBR; 6	CZE; 6	POR; 5	JPN; 7	**QAT**; Ret	MAL; 9	AUS; 10	VAL; 14			7th	117
2005	MotoGP	Ducati	SPA; 10	POR; 5	CHN; Ret	FRA; Ret	ITA; 5	CAT; 11	NED; 9	USA; Ret	GBR; 5	GER; Ret	CZE; 8	JPN; 4	MAL; 3	QAT; 6	AUS; 3	TUR; 5	VAL; 4		9th	138
2006	MotoGP	Yamaha	SPA; 13	QAT; 12	TUR; 15	CHN; 14	FRA; 11	ITA; 15	CAT; 8	NED; 9	GBR; 10	GER; 9	USA; 7	CZE; 15	MAL; 12	AUS; Ret	JPN; 14	POR; 7	VAL; 10		15th	75
2007	MotoGP	Honda	QAT; Ret	SPA; 6	TUR; 12	CHN; 10	FRA; Ret	ITA; Ret	CAT; 17	GBR; Ret	NED; 11	GER; 14	USA; 14	CZE; 10	RSM; 6	POR; 7	JPN; 18	AUS; 11	MAL; 14	VAL; 12	14th	65
2010	MotoGP	Ducati	QAT	SPA	FRA	ITA	GBR	NED	CAT	GER	USA	CZE	IND	SMR	ARA	JPN	MAL	AUS	POR; Ret	VAL; 15	21st	1

=== Superbike World Championship ===
==== By season ====
Season	Motorcycle	Team	Race	Win	Podium	Pole	FLap	Pts	Plcd	WCh
2008	Honda CBR1000RR	Hannspree Ten Kate Honda	28	2	7	1	5	313	4th	–
2009	Honda CBR1000RR	Hannspree Ten Kate Honda	28	0	4	0	0	209	7th	–
2010	Ducati 1098R	Althea Racing	26	3	8	1	7	297	**3rd**	–
2011	Ducati 1098R	Althea Racing	26	15	21	6	10	505	**1st**	1
2012	Ducati 1098R	Althea Racing	27	4	9	1	8	287.5	4th	–
2013	Ducati 1199 Panigale R	Team Ducati Alstare	15	0	0	1	0	80	15th	–
Total			**150**	**24**	**49**	**10**	**30**	**1691.5**		**1**

==== Races by year ====
(key) (Races in bold indicate pole position, races in italics indicate fastest lap)

Year	Bike	1		2		3		4		5		6		7		8		9		10		11		12		13		14		Pos	Pts
Year	Bike	R1	R2	R1	R2	R1	R2	R1	R2	R1	R2	R1	R2	R1	R2	R1	R2	R1	R2	R1	R2	R1	R2	R1	R2	R1	R2	R1	R2	Pos	Pts
2008	Honda	QAT; 6	QAT; 11	AUS; 6	AUS; 2	SPA; 5	SPA; 3	NED; 2	NED; 3	ITA; 8	ITA; Ret	**USA**; 1	**USA**; 1	GER; 5	GER; 5	SMR; 5	SMR; 8	CZE; 8	CZE; Ret	GBR; 6	GBR; 8	EUR; Ret	EUR; 9	ITA; 5	ITA; 5	FRA; 7	FRA; 4	POR; 2	POR; 7	4th	313
2009	Honda	AUS; 12	AUS; 13	QAT; 5	QAT; 13	SPA; Ret	SPA; 6	NED; Ret	NED; 7	ITA; 9	ITA; 10	RSA; 6	RSA; 6	USA; 2	USA; Ret	SMR; 11	SMR; 5	GBR; 11	GBR; Ret	CZE; 2	CZE; 5	GER; 3	GER; 3	ITA; Ret	ITA; 10	FRA; 6	FRA; 9	POR; 7	POR; Ret	7th	209
2010	Ducati	AUS; 7	AUS; 1	POR; 4	POR; 4	SPA; Ret	SPA; 2	NED; 4	NED; 6	ITA; 14	ITA; 11	RSA; 2	RSA; 5	**USA**; Ret	**USA**; Ret	SMR; 2	SMR; 5	CZE; 9	CZE; 6	GBR; 7	GBR; 10	GER; 2	GER; Ret	ITA; 1	ITA; 1	FRA; 3	FRA; 9			**3rd**	**297**
2011	Ducati	**AUS**; 1	**AUS**; 1	**EUR**; 3	**EUR**; 1	**NED**; 3	**NED**; 1	ITA; 9	ITA; 10	**USA**; 1	**USA**; 1	SMR; 1	SMR; 1	SPA; Ret	SPA; 3	CZE; 3	CZE; 3	GBR; 1	GBR; 1	**GER**; 1	**GER**; 8	**ITA**; 3	**ITA**; 1	FRA; 1	FRA; 1	POR; 1	POR; 4			**1st**	**505**
2012	Ducati	AUS; Ret	AUS; 1	ITA; 1	ITA; 1	NED; 3	NED; 17	ITA; C	ITA; 7	EUR; 6	EUR; Ret	USA; 1	USA; Ret	SMR; 2	SMR; Ret	SPA; 3	SPA; 7	CZE; 4	CZE; 3	GBR; 5	GBR; 6	**RUS**; Ret	**RUS**; 4	GER; 12	GER; 6	POR; 2	POR; 5	FRA; Ret	FRA; 7	4th	287.5
2013	Ducati	**AUS**; Ret	**AUS**; DNS	SPA; 7	SPA; 8	NED; 10	NED; 10	ITA; DNS	ITA; DNS	GBR; 12	GBR; DNS	POR; 9	POR; 6	ITA; 11	ITA; 12	RUS; Ret	RUS; C	GBR; 13	GBR; 10	GER; 10	GER; 10	TUR; DNS	TUR; DNS	USA	USA	FRA	FRA	SPA	SPA	15th	80

=== Suzuka 8 Hours results ===
Year	Team	Co-Rider	Bike	Pos
2007	(Japan) HRC 33 Honda Racing	(Japan) Tadayuki Okada	CBR1000RRW	**2nd**
2008	(Japan) Dream Honda Racing	(Japan) Ryuichi Kiyonari	CBR1000RRW	**1st**
