= 2006 United States motorcycle Grand Prix =

2006 United States Grand Prix
Race details
- Race 11 of 17 races in the 2006 Grand Prix motorcycle racing season
- Date: July 23, 2006
- Official name: Red Bull U.S. Grand Prix
- Location: Mazda Raceway Laguna Seca
- Course: Permanent racing facility; 3.610 km (2.243 mi)

MotoGP
Pole position
- Rider: (Australia) Chris Vermeulen
- Time: 1:23.168
Fastest lap
- Rider: (Spain) Dani Pedrosa
- Time: 1:23.333
Podium
- First: (United States) Nicky Hayden
- Second: (Spain) Dani Pedrosa
- Third: (Italy) Marco Melandri

The 2006 United States motorcycle Grand Prix was the eleventh race of the 2006 Motorcycle Grand Prix season. It took place on the weekend of July 21–23, 2006 at the Mazda Raceway Laguna Seca. This would be Nicky Hayden's final MotoGP victory of his career.

== MotoGP classification ==
Pos	No.	Rider	Team	Manufacturer	Laps	Time/Retired	Grid	Points
1	69	(United States) Nicky Hayden	Repsol Honda Team	Honda	32	45:04.867	6	25
2	26	(Spain) Dani Pedrosa	Repsol Honda Team	Honda	32	+3.186	4	20
3	33	(Italy) Marco Melandri	Fortuna Honda	Honda	32	+10.929	9	16
4	10	(United States) Kenny Roberts Jr.	Team Roberts	KR211V	32	+11.941	3	13
5	71	(Australia) Chris Vermeulen	Rizla Suzuki MotoGP	Suzuki	32	+27.439	1	11
6	21	(United States) John Hopkins	Rizla Suzuki MotoGP	Suzuki	32	+38.820	5	10
7	7	(Spain) Carlos Checa	Tech 3 Yamaha	Yamaha	32	+44.825	11	9
8	65	(Italy) Loris Capirossi	Ducati Marlboro Team	Ducati	32	+48.526	13	8
9	5	(United States) Colin Edwards	Camel Yamaha Team	Yamaha	32	+53.228	2	7
10	15	(Spain) Sete Gibernau	Ducati Marlboro Team	Ducati	32	+1:06.279	16	6
11	6	(Japan) Makoto Tamada	Konica Minolta Honda	Honda	32	+1:11.941	14	5
12	17	(France) Randy de Puniet	Kawasaki Racing Team	Kawasaki	32	+1:14.407	15	4
13	77	(United Kingdom) James Ellison	Tech 3 Yamaha	Yamaha	32	+1:19.283	18	3
14	66	(Germany) Alex Hofmann	Pramac d'Antin MotoGP	Ducati	32	+1:41.277	17	2
15	24	(Spain) Toni Elías	Fortuna Honda	Honda	31	+1 Lap	12	1
16	30	(Spain) José Luis Cardoso	Pramac d'Antin MotoGP	Ducati	31	+1 Lap	19	
Ret	46	(Italy) Valentino Rossi	Camel Yamaha Team	Yamaha	30	Engine	10	
Ret	56	(Japan) Shinya Nakano	Kawasaki Racing Team	Kawasaki	15	Retirement	8	
Ret	27	(Australia) Casey Stoner	Honda LCR	Honda	14	Accident	7	

== Championship standings after the race (MotoGP) ==
Below are the standings for the top five riders and constructors after round eleven has concluded.

Drivers' Championship standings

Pos.	Driver	Points
1	(United States) Nicky Hayden	194
2	(Spain) Dani Pedrosa	160
3	(Italy) Marco Melandri	150
4	(Italy) Valentino Rossi	143
5	(Italy) Loris Capirossi	126

Constructors' Championship standings

Pos.	Constructor	Points
1	(Japan) Honda	246
2	(Japan) Yamaha	181
3	(Italy) Ducati	135
4	(Japan) Suzuki	92
5	(United States) KR211V	79

Previous race: 2006 German Grand Prix	FIM Grand Prix World Championship; 2006 season	Next race: 2006 Czech Republic Grand Prix
Previous race: 2005 United States Grand Prix	United States motorcycle Grand Prix	Next race: 2007 United States Grand Prix
