= 1999 Italian motorcycle Grand Prix =

(Italy) 1999 Italian Grand Prix
Race details
- Race 5 of 16 races in the 1999 Grand Prix motorcycle racing season
- Date: 6 June 1999
- Official name: Gran Premio d'Italia IP
- Location: Mugello Circuit
- Course: Permanent racing facility; 5.245 km (3.259 mi)

500cc
Pole position
- Rider: (Japan) Tetsuya Harada
- Time: 1:52.454
Fastest lap
- Rider: (United States) Kenny Roberts Jr.
- Time: 1:53.889 on lap 2
Podium
- First: (Spain) Àlex Crivillé
- Second: (Italy) Max Biaggi
- Third: (Japan) Tadayuki Okada

250cc
Pole position
- Rider: (Italy) Marcellino Lucchi
- Time: 1:54.376
Fastest lap
- Rider: (Italy) Valentino Rossi
- Time: 1:55.254 on lap 7
Podium
- First: (Italy) Valentino Rossi
- Second: (Germany) Ralf Waldmann
- Third: (Japan) Tohru Ukawa

125cc
Pole position
- Rider: (Italy) Roberto Locatelli
- Time: 2:00.254
Fastest lap
- Rider: (Japan) Kazuto Sakata
- Time: 2:00.648 on lap 12
Podium
- First: (Italy) Roberto Locatelli
- Second: (Italy) Marco Melandri
- Third: (Japan) Noboru Ueda

The 1999 Italian motorcycle Grand Prix was the fifth race of the 1999 Grand Prix motorcycle racing season. It took place on 6 June 1999 at the Mugello Circuit.

== 500 cc classification ==
Pos.	No.	Rider	Team	Manufacturer	Laps	Time/Retired	Grid	Points
1	3	(Spain) Àlex Crivillé	Repsol Honda Team	Honda	23	44:05.522	2	25
2	2	(Italy) Max Biaggi	Marlboro Yamaha Team	Yamaha	23	+0.283	13	20
3	8	(Japan) Tadayuki Okada	Repsol Honda Team	Honda	23	+6.052	7	16
4	31	(Japan) Tetsuya Harada	Aprilia Grand Prix Racing	Aprilia	23	+6.849	1	13
5	10	(United States) Kenny Roberts Jr.	Suzuki Grand Prix Team	Suzuki	23	+12.674	3	11
6	15	(Spain) Sete Gibernau	Repsol Honda Team	Honda	23	+12.714	12	10
7	4	(Spain) Carlos Checa	Marlboro Yamaha Team	Yamaha	23	+21.341	9	9
8	19	(United States) John Kocinski	Kanemoto Honda	Honda	23	+29.800	4	8
9	14	(Spain) Juan Borja	Movistar Honda Pons	Honda	23	+29.801	8	7
10	7	(Italy) Luca Cadalora	Team Biland GP1	MuZ Weber	23	+46.742	6	6
11	26	(Japan) Haruchika Aoki	FCC TSR	TSR-Honda	23	+1:07.293	17	5
12	11	(New Zealand) Simon Crafar	Red Bull Yamaha WCM	Yamaha	23	+1:14.550	19	4
13	22	(France) Sébastien Gimbert	Tecmas Honda Elf	Honda	23	+1:20.353	18	3
14	69	(United Kingdom) Jamie Whitham	Proton KR Modenas	Modenas KR3	23	+1:27.761	16	2
15	18	(Germany) Markus Ober	Dee Cee Jeans Racing Team	Honda	23	+1:45.918	20	1
Ret	55	(France) Régis Laconi	Red Bull Yamaha WCM	Yamaha	17	Accident	10	
Ret	12	(France) Jean-Michel Bayle	Proton KR Modenas	Modenas KR3	7	Retirement	15	
Ret	17	(Netherlands) Jurgen van den Goorbergh	Team Biland GP1	MuZ Weber	6	Retirement	11	
Ret	21	(United Kingdom) Michael Rutter	Millar Honda	Honda	3	Retirement	22	
Ret	5	(Brazil) Alex Barros	Movistar Honda Pons	Honda	1	Accident	14	
Ret	25	(Spain) José Luis Cardoso	Team Maxon TSR	TSR-Honda	1	Retirement	21	
Ret	43	(Italy) Paolo Tessari	Team Paton	Paton	0	Accident	23	
Ret	6	(Japan) Norifumi Abe	Antena 3 Yamaha d'Antin	Yamaha	0	Accident	5	
DNQ	68	(Australia) Mark Willis	Buckley Systems BSL Racing	BSL		Did not qualify		

== 250 cc classification ==
Loris Capirossi was black-flagged for causing Marcellino Lucchi's crash at the start of the race; in addition, as he did not return to the pits within one lap after having been shown the flag, he was banned from the following event.

Pos.	No.	Rider	Manufacturer	Laps	Time/Retired	Grid	Points
1	46	(Italy) Valentino Rossi	Aprilia	21	40:52.837	6	25
2	6	(Germany) Ralf Waldmann	Aprilia	21	+2.643	4	20
3	4	(Japan) Tohru Ukawa	Honda	21	+2.684	9	16
4	9	(United Kingdom) Jeremy McWilliams	Aprilia	21	+11.333	7	13
5	56	(Japan) Shinya Nakano	Yamaha	21	+11.684	5	11
6	21	(Italy) Franco Battaini	Aprilia	21	+12.447	3	10
7	24	(United Kingdom) Jason Vincent	Honda	21	+21.184	11	9
8	7	(Italy) Stefano Perugini	Honda	21	+21.721	12	8
9	12	(Argentina) Sebastián Porto	Yamaha	21	+40.911	13	7
10	37	(Italy) Luca Boscoscuro	TSR-Honda	21	+45.815	16	6
11	36	(Japan) Masaki Tokudome	TSR-Honda	21	+53.891	18	5
12	16	(Sweden) Johan Stigefelt	Yamaha	21	+54.066	17	4
13	11	(Japan) Tomomi Manako	Yamaha	21	+54.096	22	3
14	23	(France) Julien Allemand	TSR-Honda	21	+1:18.330	24	2
15	15	(Spain) David García	Yamaha	21	+1:21.272	19	1
16	66	(Germany) Alex Hofmann	TSR-Honda	21	+1:27.000	14	
17	10	(Spain) Fonsi Nieto	Yamaha	21	+1:33.576	25	
18	55	(Italy) Filippo Cotti	Yamaha	21	+1:33.644	23	
19	58	(Argentina) Matías Ríos	Aprilia	20	+1 lap	28	
Ret	44	(Italy) Roberto Rolfo	Aprilia	10	Retirement	8	
Ret	14	(Australia) Anthony West	TSR-Honda	10	Retirement	21	
Ret	41	(Netherlands) Jarno Janssen	TSR-Honda	9	Accident	20	
Ret	27	(Netherlands) Rob Filart	Honda	3	Accident	26	
Ret	48	(Italy) Ivan Clementi	Aprilia	3	Accident	15	
Ret	31	(Japan) Toshihiko Honma	Yamaha	0	Accident	10	
Ret	34	(Italy) Marcellino Lucchi	Aprilia	0	Accident	1	
Ret	47	(Italy) Ivan Mengozzi	Yamaha	0	Accident	27	
DSQ	1	(Italy) Loris Capirossi	Honda	15	Black flag	2	

== 125 cc classification ==
Pos.	No.	Rider	Manufacturer	Laps	Time/Retired	Grid	Points
1	15	(Italy) Roberto Locatelli	Aprilia	20	40:52.672	1	25
2	13	(Italy) Marco Melandri	Honda	20	+0.271	5	20
3	6	(Japan) Noboru Ueda	Honda	20	+0.295	4	16
4	16	(Italy) Simone Sanna	Honda	20	+0.343	6	13
5	21	(France) Arnaud Vincent	Aprilia	20	+0.442	7	11
6	7	(Spain) Emilio Alzamora	Honda	20	+0.588	11	10
7	4	(Japan) Masao Azuma	Honda	20	+0.589	12	9
8	1	(Japan) Kazuto Sakata	Honda	20	+1.193	13	8
9	5	(Italy) Lucio Cecchinello	Honda	20	+1.260	3	7
10	23	(Italy) Gino Borsoi	Aprilia	20	+1.338	10	6
11	32	(Italy) Mirko Giansanti	Aprilia	20	+1.429	15	5
12	10	(Spain) Jerónimo Vidal	Aprilia	20	+2.269	8	4
13	54	(San Marino) Manuel Poggiali	Aprilia	20	+8.436	14	3
14	17	(Germany) Steve Jenkner	Aprilia	20	+10.382	17	2
15	26	(Italy) Ivan Goi	Honda	20	+10.541	18	1
16	11	(Italy) Max Sabbatani	Honda	20	+10.695	16	
17	29	(Spain) Ángel Nieto, Jr.	Honda	20	+17.572	19	
18	9	(France) Frédéric Petit	Aprilia	20	+17.668	9	
19	12	(France) Randy de Puniet	Aprilia	20	+23.619	21	
20	44	(Italy) Alessandro Brannetti	Aprilia	20	+23.731	20	
21	20	(Germany) Bernhard Absmeier	Aprilia	20	+34.245	24	
22	22	(Spain) Pablo Nieto	Derbi	20	+41.130	26	
23	63	(Italy) Marco Petrini	Aprilia	20	+42.373	22	
24	64	(Italy) Gaspare Caffiero	Aprilia	20	+42.593	28	
25	66	(Switzerland) Marco Tresoldi	Honda	20	+42.597	25	
Ret	18	(Germany) Reinhard Stolz	Honda	19	Retirement	23	
Ret	62	(Italy) Riccardo Chiarello	Aprilia	19	Retirement	27	
Ret	65	(Italy) Lorenzo Lanzi	Aprilia	9	Retirement	29	
Ret	8	(Italy) Gianluigi Scalvini	Aprilia	4	Retirement	2	

== Championship standings after the race (500cc) ==
Below are the standings for the top five riders and constructors after round five has concluded.

Riders' Championship standings

Pos.	Rider	Points
1	(Spain) Àlex Crivillé	104
2	(United States) Kenny Roberts Jr.	64
3	(Spain) Carlos Checa	56
4	(Spain) Sete Gibernau	56
5	(Japan) Tadayuki Okada	48

Constructors' Championship standings

Pos.	Constructor	Points
1	(Japan) Honda	111
2	(Japan) Yamaha	87
3	(Japan) Suzuki	64
4	(Italy) Aprilia	32
5	(Germany) MuZ Weber	17

- Note: Only the top five positions are included for both sets of standings.

Previous race: 1999 French Grand Prix	FIM Grand Prix World Championship; 1999 season	Next race: 1999 Catalan Grand Prix
Previous race: 1998 Italian Grand Prix	Italian Grand Prix	Next race: 2000 Italian Grand Prix
