= 2007 United States motorcycle Grand Prix =

2007 United States Grand Prix
Race details
- Race 11 of 18 races in the 2007 Grand Prix motorcycle racing season
- Date: July 22, 2007
- Official name: Red Bull U.S. Grand Prix
- Location: Mazda Raceway Laguna Seca
- Course: Permanent racing facility; 3.610 km (2.243 mi)

MotoGP
Pole position
- Rider: (Australia) Casey Stoner
- Time: 1:22.292
Fastest lap
- Rider: (Australia) Casey Stoner
- Time: 1:22.564
Podium
- First: (Australia) Casey Stoner
- Second: (Australia) Chris Vermeulen
- Third: (Italy) Marco Melandri

The 2007 United States motorcycle Grand Prix was the eleventh round of the 2007 MotoGP championship. It took place on the weekend of July 20–22, 2007 at the Mazda Raceway Laguna Seca.

== MotoGP classification ==
Chaz Davies replaced Alex Hofmann after the first practice session due to injury.

Pos.	No.	Rider	Team	Manufacturer	Laps	Time/Retired	Grid	Points
1	27	(Australia) Casey Stoner	Ducati Team	Ducati	32	44:20.325	1	25
2	71	(Australia) Chris Vermeulen	Rizla Suzuki MotoGP	Suzuki	32	+9.865	3	20
3	33	(Italy) Marco Melandri	Honda Gresini	Honda	32	+25.641	10	16
4	46	(Italy) Valentino Rossi	Fiat Yamaha Team	Yamaha	32	+30.664	5	13
5	26	(Spain) Dani Pedrosa	Repsol Honda Team	Honda	32	+35.622	2	11
6	14	(France) Randy de Puniet	Kawasaki Racing Team	Kawasaki	32	+38.306	13	10
7	13	(Australia) Anthony West	Kawasaki Racing Team	Kawasaki	32	+41.422	12	9
8	6	(Japan) Makoto Tamada	Dunlop Yamaha Tech 3	Yamaha	32	+42.355	11	8
9	4	(Brazil) Alex Barros	Pramac d'Antin	Ducati	32	+43.520	17	7
10	95	(United States) Roger Lee Hayden	Kawasaki Racing Team	Kawasaki	32	+43.720	16	6
11	5	(United States) Colin Edwards	Fiat Yamaha Team	Yamaha	32	+47.376	8	5
12	56	(Japan) Shinya Nakano	Konica Minolta Honda	Honda	32	+52.848	9	4
13	50	(France) Sylvain Guintoli	Dunlop Yamaha Tech 3	Yamaha	32	+58.410	14	3
14	7	(Spain) Carlos Checa	Honda LCR	Honda	32	+1:15.366	15	2
15	21	(United States) John Hopkins	Rizla Suzuki MotoGP	Suzuki	30	+2 laps	7	1
16	57	(United Kingdom) Chaz Davies	Pramac d'Antin	Ducati	29	+3 laps	20	
Ret	1	(United States) Nicky Hayden	Repsol Honda Team	Honda	22	Retirement	4	
Ret	17	(Canada) Miguel Duhamel	Honda Gresini	Honda	10	Retirement	19	
Ret	80	(United States) Kurtis Roberts	Team Roberts	KR212V	5	Retirement	18	
Ret	65	(Italy) Loris Capirossi	Ducati Team	Ducati	3	Retirement	6	

== Championship standings after the race (MotoGP) ==
Below are the standings for the top five riders and constructors after round eleven has concluded.

Riders' Championship standings

Pos.	Rider	Points
1	(Australia) Casey Stoner	221
2	(Italy) Valentino Rossi	177
3	(Spain) Dani Pedrosa	155
4	(Australia) Chris Vermeulen	113
5	(Italy) Marco Melandri	113

Constructors' Championship standings

Pos.	Constructor	Points
1	(Italy) Ducati	233
2	(Japan) Yamaha	197
3	(Japan) Honda	190
4	(Japan) Suzuki	151
5	(Japan) Kawasaki	74

- Note: Only the top five positions are included for both sets of standings.

Previous race: 2007 German Grand Prix	FIM Grand Prix World Championship; 2007 season	Next race: 2007 Czech Republic Grand Prix
Previous race: 2006 United States Grand Prix	United States motorcycle Grand Prix	Next race: 2008 United States Grand Prix
