= Randy de Puniet =

French motorcycle racer

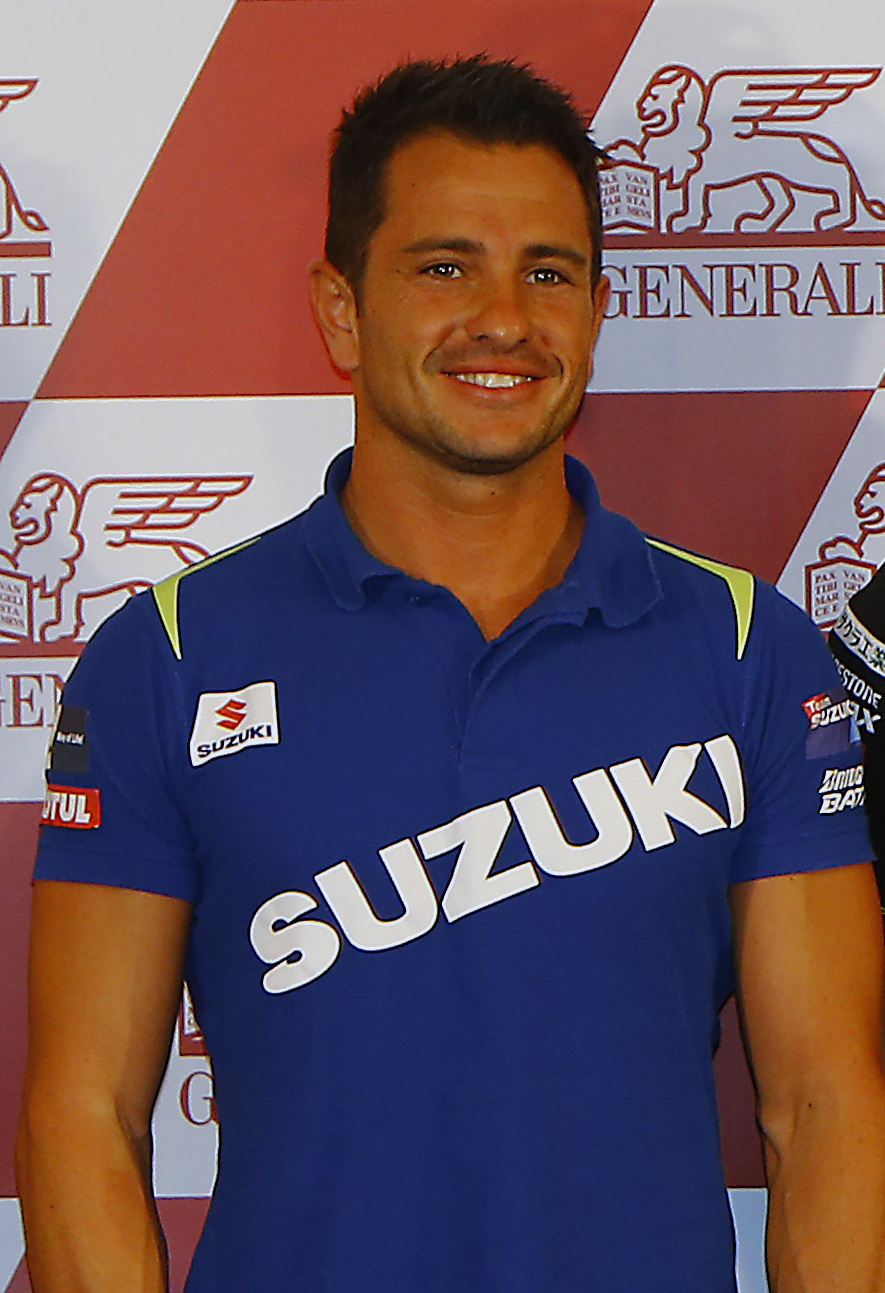
- De Puniet in 2014
- Nationality: French
- Born: 14 February 1981 (age 45); Maisons-Laffitte, France
- Current team: LCR E-Team
- Bike number: 14
- Website: www.depuniet.com/en/
Motorcycle racing career statistics
MotoGP World Championship
| Active years | 2006–2014 |
| Manufacturers | Kawasaki, Honda, Ducati, ART, Suzuki |
| Championships | 0 |
| 2014 championship position | NC (0 pts) |
Starts / Wins / Podiums / Poles / F. laps / Points; 140 / 0 / 2 / 0 / 0 / 575
250cc World Championship
| Active years | 2001–2005 |
| Manufacturers | Aprilia |
| Championships | 0 |
| 2005 championship position | 8th (138 pts) |
Starts / Wins / Podiums / Poles / F. laps / Points; 80 / 5 / 22 / 9 / 4 / 729
125cc World Championship
| Active years | 1998–2000 |
| Manufacturers | Honda, Aprilia |
| Championships | 0 |
| 2000 championship position | 17th (50 pts) |
Starts / Wins / Podiums / Poles / F. laps / Points; 33 / 0 / 0 / 0 / 0 / 76
MotoE World Championship
| Active years | 2019 |
| Manufacturers | Energica |
| Championships | 0 |
| 2019 championship position | 17th (21 pts) |
Starts / Wins / Podiums / Poles / F. laps / Points; 6 / 0 / 0 / 0 / 0 / 21
Superbike World Championship
| Active years | 2015 |
| Manufacturers | Suzuki |
| Championships | 0 |
| 2015 championship position | 18th (52 pts) |
Starts / Wins / Podiums / Poles / F. laps / Points; 23 / 0 / 0 / 0 / 0 / 39

Randy de Puniet (born 14 February 1981), sometimes known by his initials RdP, is a French motorcycle road racer who competed in Grands Prix racing between 1998 and 2014, achieving five wins in the 250cc class. He also competed in the Superbike World Championship during the 2015 season, and in the MotoE World Cup aboard an Energica Ego Corsa, both with little success.

== Career ==
Born in Maisons-Laffitte, Yvelines, de Puniet was French 125cc champion in 1998, moving up to the world championship a year later. In 2001, he moved up to the 250cc World Championship. He earned two podium finishes in 2002 to earn a factory Aprilia ride for 2003. He took his first win in Catalunya, coming fourth overall with three wins. In 2004 he was third with a single win, spending 2005 with on an Aprilia run by former world champion, Jorge Martínez and his Aspar Team.

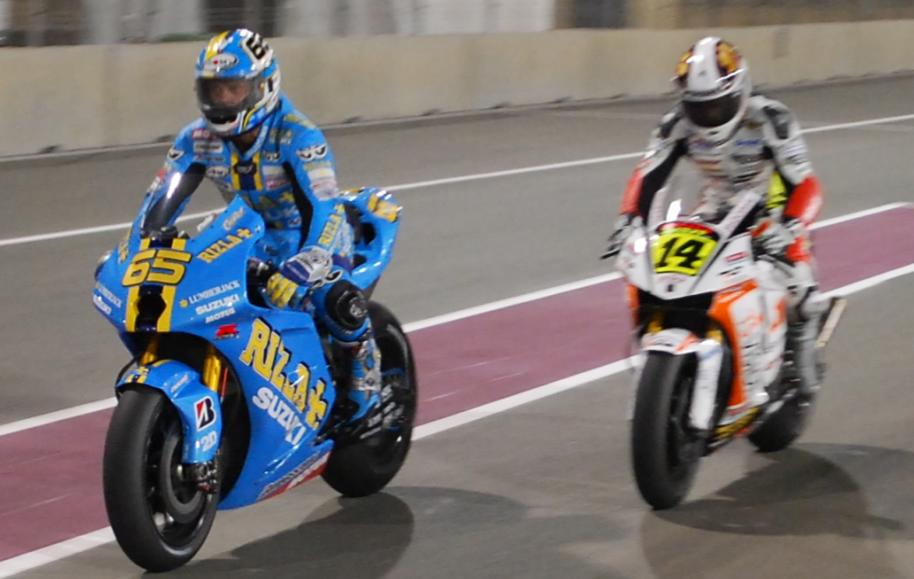
De Puniet (in white) behind Loris Capirossi

2006 was de Puniet's first season in MotoGP, for the Kawasaki factory team, where he remained for 2007. He took his first front-row start at the 2007 Catalan Grand Prix, and finished a career-best fifth. Up until Donington, he started all but one other race on the third row. He started fourth and finished second at Motegi in the wet.

LCR Honda announced on 24 August 2007 that de Puniet would ride for them in 2008 and 2009. He suffered a fractured ankle in a midseason testing crash in 2009. He ultimately remained with LCR for 2010, despite being linked to the French Tech 3 squad. He had been in contention for a Tech 3 ride for 2011, but team boss Hervé Poncharal denied this link.

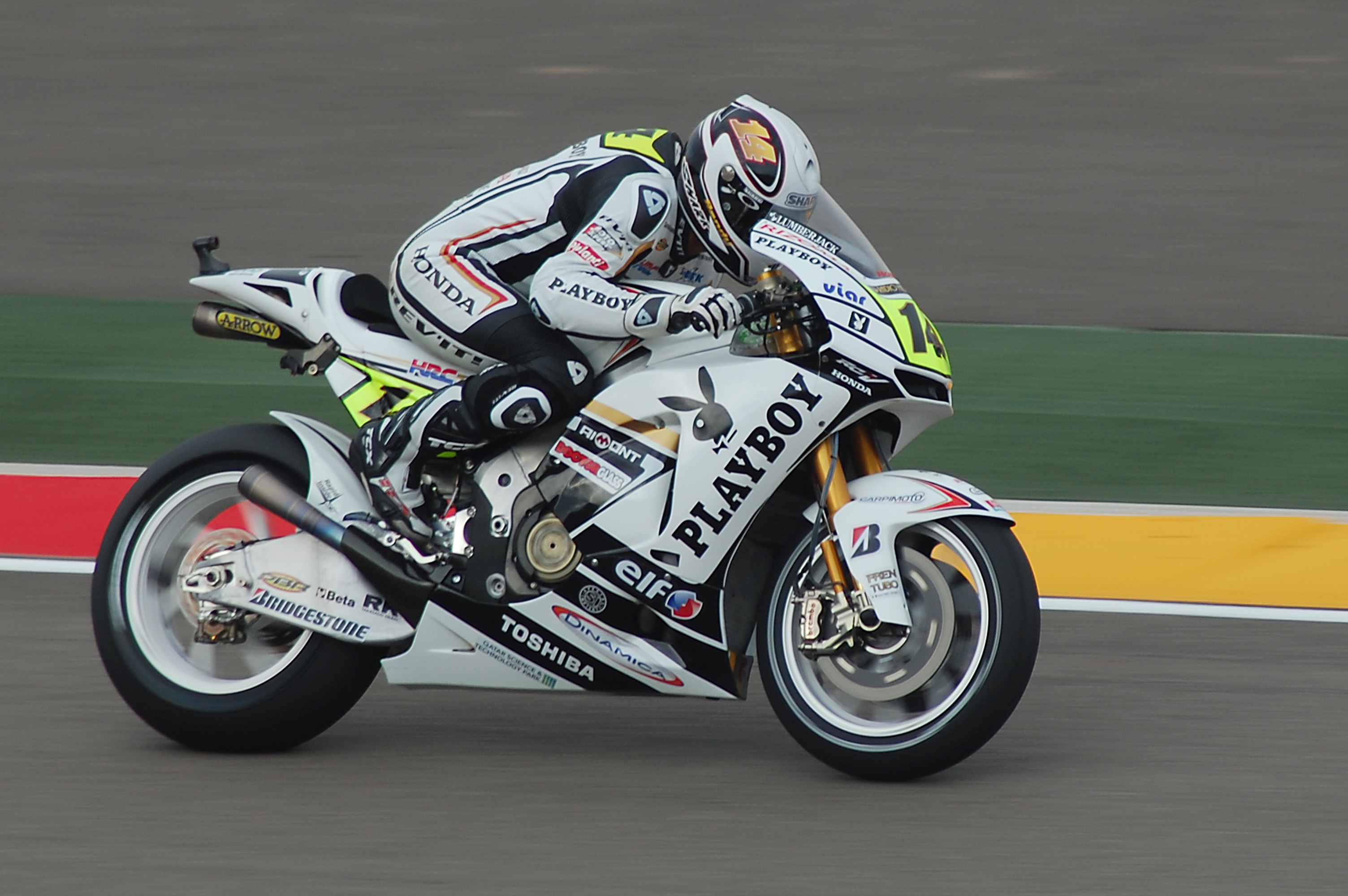
Randy de Puniet at the 2010 Aragon Grand Prix

De Puniet enjoyed a strong run of form midseason in 2010, including consecutive front row starts at Silverstone and Assen. He was running fifth in the championship before breaking his leg in a crash at the Sachsenring. He missed the race at Laguna Seca before returning at Brno, where he finished tenth.

In spite of the promise, de Puniet showed on the Honda before his injury, De Puniet raced for Pramac Racing in 2011. After a disappointing year on the satellite Ducati, De Puniet joined the Power Electronics Aspar team for 2012, a 'Claiming Rules Team' running a modified Aprilia RSV4 known as the ART.

For 2014, De Puniet was not racing, instead concentrating on development and testing on the Suzuki 2015 MotoGP machine. He hoped to receive a wild card ride during 2014, and did so at the final race in Valencia, retiring from the race.

In 2021, de Puniet competed in the FIM Endurance World Championship with Moto Ain.

== Career statistics ==
=== Grand Prix motorcycle racing ===
==== By season ====
| Season | Class | Motorcycle | Team | Number | Race | Win | Podium | Pole | FLap | Pts | Plcd | WCh |
|---|---|---|---|---|---|---|---|---|---|---|---|---|
| 1998 | 125cc | Honda RS125R | Honda France | 67 | 1 | 0 | 0 | 0 | 0 | 0 | NC | – |
| 1999 | 125cc | Aprilia RS125 | Scrab Competition | 12 | 16 | 0 | 0 | 0 | 0 | 26 | 18th | – |
| 2000 | 125cc | Aprilia RS125 | Scrab Competition | 12 | 16 | 0 | 0 | 0 | 0 | 50 | 17th | – |
| 2001 | 250cc | Aprilia RSV250 | Equipe de France - Scrab GP | 81 | 16 | 0 | 0 | 0 | 0 | 50 | 13th | – |
| 2002 | 250cc | Aprilia RSV250 | Campetella Racing | 17 | 16 | 0 | 2 | 1 | 0 | 119 | 9th | – |
| 2003 | 250cc | Aprilia RSV250 | Safilo Oxydo - LCR | 7 | 16 | 3 | 9 | 5 | 2 | 208 | 4th | – |
| 2004 | 250cc | Aprilia RSV250 | Safilo Carrera - LCR | 7 | 16 | 1 | 8 | 2 | 0 | 214 | **3rd** | – |
| 2005 | 250cc | Aprilia RSV250 | Aprilia Aspar 250cc | 7 | 16 | 1 | 3 | 1 | 2 | 138 | 8th | – |
| 2006 | MotoGP | Kawasaki Ninja ZX-RR | Kawasaki Racing Team | 17 | 17 | 0 | 0 | 0 | 0 | 37 | 16th | – |
| 2007 | MotoGP | Kawasaki Ninja ZX-RR | Kawasaki Racing Team | 14 | 18 | 0 | 1 | 0 | 0 | 108 | 11th | – |
| 2008 | MotoGP | Honda RC212V | LCR Honda MotoGP | 14 | 18 | 0 | 0 | 0 | 0 | 61 | 15th | – |
| 2009 | MotoGP | Honda RC212V | LCR Honda MotoGP | 14 | 17 | 0 | 1 | 0 | 0 | 106 | 11th | – |
| 2010 | MotoGP | Honda RC212V | LCR Honda MotoGP | 14 | 17 | 0 | 0 | 0 | 0 | 116 | 9th | – |
| 2011 | MotoGP | Ducati Desmosedici GP11 | Pramac Racing Team | 14 | 16 | 0 | 0 | 0 | 0 | 49 | 16th | – |
| 2012 | MotoGP | Aprilia ART | Power Electronics Aspar | 14 | 18 | 0 | 0 | 0 | 0 | 62 | 13th | – |
| 2013 | MotoGP | Aprilia ART | Power Electronics Aspar | 14 | 18 | 0 | 0 | 0 | 0 | 36 | 15th | – |
| 2014 | MotoGP | Suzuki GSX-RR | Team Suzuki MotoGP | 14 | 1 | 0 | 0 | 0 | 0 | 0 | NC | – |
| 2019 | MotoE | Energica Ego | LCR E-Team | 14 | 6 | 0 | 0 | 0 | 0 | 21 | 17th | – |
| Total | | | | | **259** | **5** | **24** | **9** | **4** | **1401** | | **0** |

==== By class ====
| Class | Seasons | 1st GP | 1st Pod | 1st Win | Race | Win | Podiums | Pole | FLap | Pts | WChmp |
|---|---|---|---|---|---|---|---|---|---|---|---|
| 125cc | 1998–2000 | 1998 France | | | 33 | 0 | 0 | 0 | 0 | 76 | 0 |
| 250cc | 2001–2005 | 2001 Japan | 2002 Japan | 2003 Catalunya | 80 | 5 | 22 | 9 | 4 | 729 | 0 |
| MotoGP | 2006–2014 | 2006 Spain | 2007 Japan | | 140 | 0 | 2 | 0 | 0 | 575 | 0 |
| MotoE | 2019 | 2019 Germany | | | 6 | 0 | 0 | 0 | 0 | 21 | 0 |
| Total | 1998–2014, 2019 | | | | **259** | **5** | **24** | **9** | **4** | **1401** | **0** |

==== Races by year ====
(key) (Races in bold indicate pole position, races in italics indicate fastest lap)

| Year | Class | Bike | 1 | 2 | 3 | 4 | 5 | 6 | 7 | 8 | 9 | 10 | 11 | 12 | 13 | 14 | 15 | 16 | 17 | 18 | Pos | Pts |
|---|---|---|---|---|---|---|---|---|---|---|---|---|---|---|---|---|---|---|---|---|---|---|
| 1998 | 125cc | Honda | JPN | MAL | SPA | ITA | FRA; 17 | MAD | NED | GBR | GER | CZE | IMO | CAT | AUS | ARG | | | | | NC | 0 |
| 1999 | 125cc | Aprilia | MAL; 20 | JPN; 15 | SPA; Ret | FRA; 11 | ITA; 19 | CAT; 9 | NED; Ret | GBR; Ret | GER; 15 | CZE; Ret | IMO; Ret | VAL; 10 | AUS; 21 | RSA; Ret | BRA; 18 | ARG; 10 | | | 18th | 26 |
| 2000 | 125cc | Aprilia | RSA; 14 | MAL; Ret | JPN; 10 | SPA; 13 | FRA; 12 | ITA; 9 | CAT; 13 | NED; Ret | GBR; 10 | GER; Ret | CZE; Ret | POR; 7 | VAL; 18 | BRA; 9 | PAC; Ret | AUS; 13 | | | 17th | 50 |
| 2001 | 250cc | Aprilia | JPN; Ret | RSA; Ret | SPA; 18 | FRA; Ret | ITA; Ret | CAT; 8 | NED; 13 | GBR; Ret | GER; 5 | CZE; 6 | POR; 17 | VAL; 10 | PAC; 11 | AUS; Ret | MAL; 12 | BRA; 13 | | | 13th | 50 |
| 2002 | 250cc | Aprilia | JPN; 3 | RSA; 6 | SPA; Ret | FRA; 3 | ITA; 5 | CAT; 4 | NED; Ret | GBR; 6 | GER; Ret | CZE; 6 | POR; Ret | **BRA**; Ret | PAC; Ret | MAL; 6 | AUS; 6 | VAL; 4 | | | 9th | 119 |
| 2003 | 250cc | Aprilia | JPN; Ret | **RSA**; 2 | **SPA**; 3 | FRA; 2 | **ITA**; Ret | **CAT**; 1 | NED; Ret | GBR; 8 | GER; 3 | CZE; 1 | POR; 3 | BRA; 3 | PAC; 6 | MAL; 5 | AUS; Ret | **VAL**; 1 | | | 4th | 208 |
| 2004 | 250cc | Aprilia | **RSA**; 2 | SPA; 2 | FRA; 2 | ITA; 4 | **CAT**; 1 | NED; 4 | BRA; 8 | GER; 5 | GBR; 3 | CZE; 2 | POR; 3 | JPN; 11 | QAT; Ret | MAL; 5 | AUS; Ret | VAL; 3 | | | **3rd** | **214** |
| 2005 | 250cc | Aprilia | SPA; Ret | **POR**; 3 | CHN; 8 | FRA; 2 | ITA; Ret | CAT; 6 | NED; 8 | GBR; 1 | GER; 6 | CZE; 8 | JPN; 5 | MAL; 4 | QAT; Ret | AUS; 7 | TUR; Ret | VAL; 8 | | | 8th | 138 |
| 2006 | MotoGP | Kawasaki | SPA; Ret | QAT; Ret | TUR; 12 | CHN; 12 | FRA; Ret | ITA; 13 | CAT; Ret | NED; 14 | GBR; 12 | GER; Ret | USA; 12 | CZE; 14 | MAL; 13 | AUS; 11 | JPN; Ret | POR; 10 | VAL; Ret | | 16th | 37 |
| 2007 | MotoGP | Kawasaki | QAT; Ret | SPA; 13 | CHN; 8 | TUR; 8 | FRA; Ret | ITA; Ret | CAT; 5 | GBR; 6 | NED; Ret | GER; Ret | USA; 6 | CZE; 8 | RSM; Ret | POR; Ret | JPN; 2 | AUS; 6 | MAL; 4 | VAL; 9 | 11th | 108 |
| 2008 | MotoGP | Honda | QAT; 9 | SPA; Ret | POR; 15 | CHN; 13 | FRA; 9 | ITA; Ret | CAT; Ret | GBR; 12 | NED; Ret | GER; 8 | USA; 6 | CZE; 16 | RSM; Ret | INP; 13 | JPN; 12 | AUS; 9 | MAL; 10 | VAL; 15 | 15th | 61 |
| 2009 | MotoGP | Honda | QAT; 10 | JPN; 11 | SPA; 4 | FRA; 14 | ITA; 8 | CAT; 8 | NED; 7 | USA; 9 | GER; Ret | GBR; 3 | CZE; 10 | INP; 12 | RSM; 12 | POR; 11 | AUS; 8 | MAL; Ret | VAL; 11 | | 11th | 106 |
| 2010 | MotoGP | Honda | QAT; 6 | SPA; 9 | FRA; 7 | ITA; 6 | GBR; 6 | NED; 6 | CAT; 4 | GER; Ret | USA | CZE; 10 | INP; 13 | RSM; 13 | ARA; Ret | JPN; 9 | MAL; 10 | AUS; 10 | POR; 6 | VAL; 10 | 9th | 116 |
| 2011 | MotoGP | Ducati | QAT; Ret | SPA; Ret | POR; 10 | FRA; Ret | CAT; Ret | GBR; 12 | NED; Ret | ITA; 14 | GER; 13 | USA; DNS | CZE; 12 | INP; 8 | RSM; 14 | ARA; 12 | JPN; 10 | AUS; 6 | MAL; C | VAL; Ret | 16th | 49 |
| 2012 | MotoGP | ART | QAT; 13 | SPA; Ret | POR; 13 | FRA; Ret | CAT; 15 | GBR; 12 | NED; 8 | GER; 11 | ITA; 12 | USA; 11 | INP; Ret | CZE; 8 | RSM; 9 | ARA; 11 | JPN; Ret | MAL; Ret | AUS; 11 | VAL; 12 | 13th | 62 |
| 2013 | MotoGP | ART | QAT; 12 | AME; 14 | SPA; Ret | FRA; Ret | ITA; 11 | CAT; Ret | NED; 12 | GER; 12 | USA; Ret | INP; Ret | CZE; 15 | GBR; 16 | RSM; 17 | ARA; 13 | MAL; 12 | AUS; 10 | JPN; 13 | VAL; Ret | 15th | 36 |
| 2014 | MotoGP | Suzuki | QAT | AME | ARG | SPA | FRA | ITA | CAT | NED | GER | INP | CZE | GBR | RSM | ARA | JPN | AUS | MAL | VAL; Ret | NC | 0 |
| 2019 | MotoE | Energica | GER; 17 | AUT; 12 | RSM1; 11 | RSM2; 13 | VAL1; 12 | VAL2; 11 | | | | | | | | | | | | | 17th | 21 |

=== Superbike World Championship ===
==== Races by year ====
(key) (Races in bold indicate pole position, races in italics indicate fastest lap)

| Year | Bike | 1 | | 2 | | 3 | | 4 | | 5 | | 6 | | 7 | | 8 | | 9 | | 10 | | 11 | | 12 | | 13 | | Pos | Pts |
| Year | Bike | R1 | R2 | R1 | R2 | R1 | R2 | R1 | R2 | R1 | R2 | R1 | R2 | R1 | R2 | R1 | R2 | R1 | R2 | R1 | R2 | R1 | R2 | R1 | R2 | R1 | R2 | Pos | Pts |
|---|---|---|---|---|---|---|---|---|---|---|---|---|---|---|---|---|---|---|---|---|---|---|---|---|---|---|---|---|---|
| 2015 | Suzuki | AUS; 17 | AUS; 7 | THA; 13 | THA; Ret | SPA; Ret | SPA; 13 | NED; Ret | NED; Ret | ITA; DNS | ITA; Ret | GBR; 14 | GBR; 14 | POR; 13 | POR; 16 | SMR; Ret | SMR; 17 | USA; 11 | USA; 11 | MAL; 12 | MAL; 13 | SPA; 16 | SPA; Ret | FRA; Ret | FRA; 18 | QAT; 12 | QAT; 7 | 18th | 52 |

=== FIM World Endurance Championship ===
==== By team ====
| Year | Team | Bike | Rider | TC |
|---|---|---|---|---|
| 2018–19 | (Japan) Team SRC Kawasaki France | Kawasaki ZX-10R | (France) Jérémy Guarnoni (Spain) David Checa (France) Erwan Nigon (France) Randy de Puniet | 1st |
| 2025 | (Belgium) Elf Marc VDS KM99 | Yamaha YZF-R1 | (France) Jérémy Guarnoni (Italy) Alessandro del Bianco (France) Florian Marino (France) Randy de Puniet | 9th |

=== Suzuka 8 Hours results ===
| Year | Class | Team | Co-riders | Bike | Pos |
|---|---|---|---|---|---|
| 2025 | **EWC** | (Belgium) Elf Marc VDS KM99 | (France) Jérémy Guarnoni (France) Florian Marino | Yamaha YZF-R1 | 9th |
| 2026 | **EWC** | (Belgium) Elf Marc VDS KM99 | (France) Florian Marino (Italy) Alessandro Del Bianco | Yamaha YZF-R1 | 30th |

== Commitment ==
De Puniet is a member of the 'Champions for Peace' club, a group of more than 90 famous elite created by Peace and Sport, a Monaco-based international organization placed under the High Patronage of H.S.H Prince Albert II.
