= Shinya Nakano =

Japanese motorcycle racer

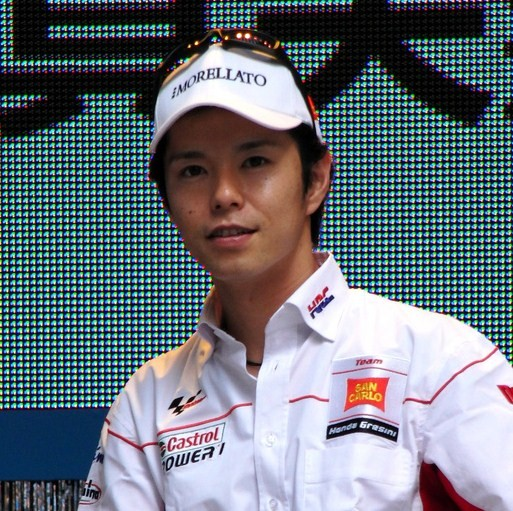
- Nakano in 2008
- Nationality: Japanese
- Born: 10 October 1977 (age 49); Tokyo, Japan
Motorcycle racing career statistics
Grand Prix motorcycle racing
Active years	1998 - 2008
First race	1998 250cc Japanese Grand Prix
Last race	2008 MotoGP Valencia Grand Prix
First win	1999 250cc Japanese Grand Prix
Last win	2000 250cc Valencia Grand Prix
Team(s)	Honda, Yamaha, Kawasaki
Championships	0
Starts / Wins / Podiums / Poles / F. laps / Points; 168 / 6 / 21 / 5 / 9 / 1282

Shinya Nakano (Japanese: 中野 真矢, Hepburn: Nakano Shin'ya; born in Tokyo on 10 October 1977, and raised in Chiba) is a Japanese retired Grand Prix motorcycle road racer and Superbike rider. He is not related to the former Formula One racer Shinji Nakano.

== Career ==
=== Early career ===
Nakano was All-Japan 250cc champion in 1998, the highlight of a long career in both 125cc and 250cc Japanese national championships. Nakano moved to international competition full-time in 1999, adjusting to 250cc Grand Prix racing quickly, finishing fourth overall with five podium finishes. In 2000, Nakano and teammate Olivier Jacque battled with Daijiro Kato for the title, which ultimately went to Jacque. Nakano set the fastest 250cc lap at Motegi in 2000, a record that stood until 2008 – the longest standing lap record in the series.

=== 250cc & 500cc/MotoGP World Championship ===
For 2001, the Tech 3 team moved up to the 500cc World Championship, which would eventually become MotoGP in 2002. Despite having semi-works machinery, Nakano managed to finish fifth in the championship and won the Rookie of the Year award. Nakano started 2002 on a 500cc two-stroke machine, but the team was able to provide the newer 990cc four-stroke by the end of the season. 2003 was less successful prompting a move to Kawasaki for 2004.

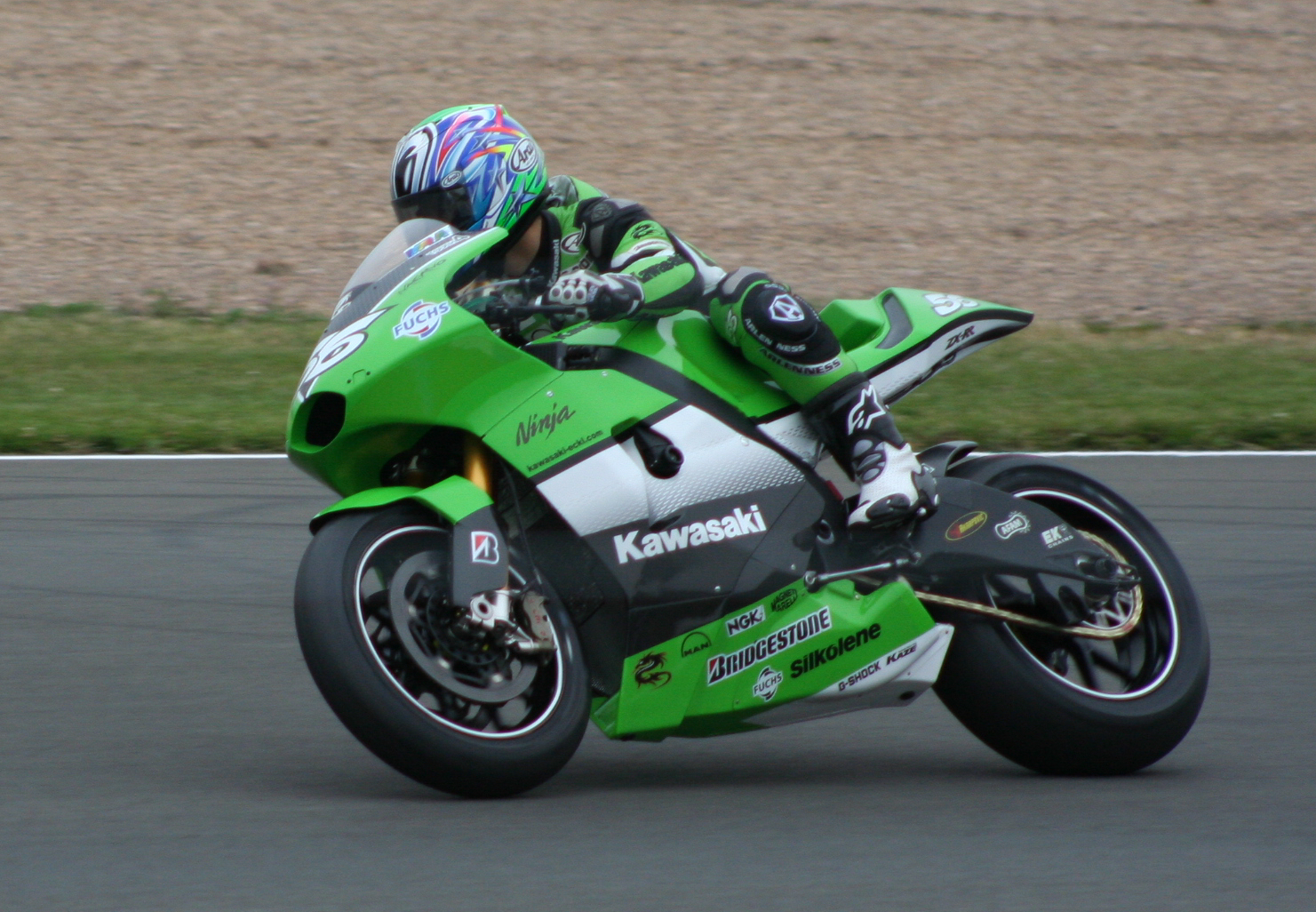
Nakano riding the Kawasaki ZX-RR

Kawasaki suffered a disastrous debut year with Garry McCoy and Andrew Pitt, before the team improved with Nakano on board. The team's first podium came at the 2004 Japanese Grand Prix and two seasons of consistent results earned him a pair of tenth place championship finishes. In 2006, Nakano was able to produce strong qualifying runs but less competitive races, a trait of the Bridgestone tyres. Two jump-start penalties did not help Nakano's results. At the 2006 Australian Grand Prix, Nakano started on the front row and lead the early laps, before switching to wet tyres too late and not being competitive on them.

For 2007, Nakano joined Konica Minolta Honda. Results were thin in 2007, with only a handful of top-ten qualifying and race results. Rumors began that Nakano might make the move to the highly competitive World Superbike Championship for the 2008 season. However, Nakano ultimately joined Fausto Gresini's MotoGP team, replacing Toni Elías. Bringing experience with Bridgestone tyres and Honda bikes, he had a solid season, scoring more points in the first half of 2008 than in the whole of 2007. At Brno, Nakano was given the factory spring-valve Honda RC212V, beginning a string of greatly improved results. Nakano left the Gresini team at the end of the 2008 season, following the team's decision to sign Alice Ducati rider Toni Elías for 2009.

=== Superbike World Championship ===
In 2009, Nakano was signed by Aprilia along with Max Biaggi for their return to the World Superbike Championship after a three-year absence. He finished the season in 14th place. On October 28, 2009, Nakano announced that he would be retiring from professional motorcycle racing. The decision followed a season in which he had struggled with injury problems, including a broken collarbone and a neck injury that kept him out of the final three rounds of the season.

== Career statistics ==
=== Grand Prix motorcycle racing ===
==== By season ====
Season	Class	Motorcycle	Team	Race	Win	Podium	Pole	FLap	Pts	Plcd
1998	250cc	Yamaha YZR250	BP Yamaha Racing Team	2	0	1	0	0	33	19th
1999	250cc	Yamaha YZR250	Chesterfield Yamaha Tech 3	16	1	5	2	1	207	4th
2000	250cc	Yamaha YZR250	Chesterfield Yamaha Tech 3	16	5	12	3	7	272	**2nd**
2001	500cc	Yamaha YZR500	Gauloises Yamaha Tech 3	15	0	1	0	1	155	5th
2002	MotoGP	Yamaha YZR500; Yamaha YZR-M1	Gauloises Yamaha Tech 3	16	0	0	0	0	68	11th
2003	MotoGP	Yamaha YZR-M1	d'Antin Yamaha Team	16	0	0	0	0	101	10th
2004	MotoGP	Kawasaki ZX-RR	Kawasaki Racing Team	16	0	1	0	0	83	10th
2005	MotoGP	Kawasaki ZX-RR	Kawasaki Racing Team	17	0	0	0	0	98	10th
2006	MotoGP	Kawasaki ZX-RR	Kawasaki Racing Team	17	0	1	0	0	92	14th
2007	MotoGP	Honda RC212V	Konica Minolta Honda	18	0	0	0	0	47	17th
2008	MotoGP	Honda RC212V	San Carlo Honda Gresini	18	0	0	0	0	126	9th
Total				**167**	**6**	**21**	**5**	**9**	**1282**	

==== Races by year ====
(key) (Races in bold indicate pole position) (Races in italics indicate fastest lap)

Year	Class	Bike	1	2	3	4	5	6	7	8	9	10	11	12	13	14	15	16	17	18	Pos	Pts
1998	250cc	Yamaha	JPN; 2	MAL	ESP	ITA	FRA	MAD	NED	GBR	GER	CZE	IMO	CAT	AUS; 4	ARG					19th	33
1999	250cc	Yamaha	MAL; 3	JPN; 1	**ESP**; Ret	FRA; 2	ITA; 5	CAT; 4	NED; 5	GBR; 3	GER; 4	CZE; 4	IMO; 5	**VAL**; 4	AUS; 4	RSA; 2	BRA; 15	ARG; 5			4th	207
2000	250cc	Yamaha	**RSA**; 1	MAL; 1	JPN; 3	ESP; 15	FRA; 2	ITA; 1	**CAT**; 3	NED; 3	GBR; 7	GER; 3	CZE; 1	POR; Ret	VAL; 1	BRA; 4	PAC; 2	**AUS**; 2			**2nd**	**272**
2001	500cc	Yamaha	JPN; 5	RSA; 4	ESP; 4	FRA; 11	ITA; 8	CAT; 4	NED; 5	GBR; 6	GER; 3	CZE; DNS	POR; 9	VAL; 7	PAC; 6	AUS; 7	MAL; 4	BRA; 9			5th	155
2002	MotoGP	Yamaha	JPN; Ret	RSA; 8	ESP; 17	FRA; 13	ITA; 11	CAT; Ret	NED; 8	GBR; 10	GER; 5	CZE; Ret	POR; 12	BRA; Ret	PAC; 16	MAL; 6	AUS; 13	VAL; 6			11th	68
2003	MotoGP	Yamaha	JPN; 9	RSA; 11	ESP; 8	FRA; 14	ITA; 5	CAT; 5	NED; 13	GBR; 9	GER; 7	CZE; 14	POR; 12	BRA; 8	PAC; 9	MAL; 8	AUS; 7	VAL; Ret			10th	101
2004	MotoGP	Kawasaki	RSA; 12	ESP; 9	FRA; Ret	ITA; Ret	CAT; 7	NED; Ret	BRA; 9	GER; 7	GBR; 15	CZE; 12	POR; 11	JPN; 3	QAT; Ret	MAL; 8	AUS; 12	VAL; 7			10th	83
2005	MotoGP	Kawasaki	ESP; 5	POR; 8	CHN; Ret	FRA; 8	ITA; 10	CAT; 9	NED; 8	USA; 9	GBR; Ret	GER; 6	CZE; 12	JPN; Ret	MAL; Ret	QAT; 7	AUS; 7	TUR; 10	VAL; 11		10th	98
2006	MotoGP	Kawasaki	ESP; 7	QAT; 11	TUR; 8	CHN; 8	FRA; 12	ITA; 11	CAT; DSQ	NED; 2	GBR; Ret	GER; 6	USA; Ret	CZE; 8	MAL; Ret	AUS; 8	JPN; Ret	POR; Ret	VAL; 7		14th	92
2007	MotoGP	Honda	QAT; 10	ESP; 10	CHN; 13	TUR; Ret	FRA; Ret	ITA; 13	CAT; 15	GBR; 14	NED; 12	GER; Ret	USA; 12	CZE; 14	RSM; 10	POR; 11	JPN; 16	AUS; 13	MAL; 16	VAL; 14	17th	47
2008	MotoGP	Honda	QAT; 13	ESP; 9	POR; 10	CHN; 10	FRA; 10	ITA; 9	CAT; 9	GBR; 9	NED; 8	GER; 9	USA; 10	CZE; 4	RSM; 12	IND; 17	JPN; 8	AUS; 5	MAL; 5	VAL; 7	9th	126

=== Superbike World Championship ===
==== By season ====
Season	Motorcycle	Team	Race	Win	Podium	Pole	FLap	Pts	Plcd
2009	Aprilia RSV4	Aprilia Racing	18	0	0	0	0	86	14th
Total			**18**	**0**	**0**	**0**	**0**	**86**	

==== Races by year ====
(key) (Races in bold indicate pole position, races in italics indicate fastest lap)

Year	Bike	1		2		3		4		5		6		7		8		9		10		11		12		13		14		Pos	Pts
Year	Bike	R1	R2	R1	R2	R1	R2	R1	R2	R1	R2	R1	R2	R1	R2	R1	R2	R1	R2	R1	R2	R1	R2	R1	R2	R1	R2	R1	R2	Pos	Pts
2009	Aprilia	AUS; 15	AUS; 12	QAT; 4	QAT; 7	SPA; DNS	SPA; DNS	NED; Ret	NED; DNS	ITA; 13	ITA; 12	RSA; 7	RSA; 7	USA; Ret	USA; 7	SMR; 9	SMR; 13	GBR; 6	GBR; Ret	CZE; Ret	CZE; 11	GER; Ret	GER; DNS	ITA	ITA	FRA	FRA	POR	POR	14th	86
