= Mark Willis (motorcyclist) =

Australian motorcycle racer (born 1976)

- Nationality: (Australia) Australian
- Born: 3 May 1976 (age 50); Narrabri, NSW
Motorcycle racing career statistics
500cc World Championship
Active years	1998–2001
Manufacturers	Suzuki, BSL, Modenas KR3, Pulse
Starts / Wins / Podiums / Poles / F. laps / Points; 22 / 0 / 0 / 0 / 0 / 11
Superbike World Championship
Active years	1998
Manufacturers	Suzuki
Starts / Wins / Podiums / Poles / F. laps / Points; 2 / 0 / 0 / 0 / 0 / 17
Supersport World Championship
Active years	2002
Manufacturers	Yamaha
Starts / Wins / Podiums / Poles / F. laps / Points; 1 / 0 / 0 / 0 / 0 / 0

Mark Willis (born 3 May 1976 in Narrabri, NSW, Australia) is an Australian former Grand Prix motorcycle road racer. He was Australian Long Track Champion in 1993 and Australian Rider of the Year in 1996.

== Career ==
In 1991, Willis won the NSW championship in Australia. He later became the Australian Long Track Champion in 1993 and 'Australian Rider of the Year' in 1996.

Willis participated in the Australian Superbike Championship in 1997 with the Factory Suzuki Superbike team, Troy Bayliss was his teammate. Willis took his first race win in the wet at Eastern Creek and finished fourth in the championship.

In 1998 Willis was a wildcard ride in the Superbike World Championship at Phillip Island saw Willis finish sixth in Race 1 and ninth in Race 2. This was on a private Suzuki, all the more impressive as he beat both factory Suzuki riders along with many of the other WSB regulars. He competed in both the Australian Superbike and Supersport until injury sidelined him for the final two rounds of both. He was then offered a wildcard ride in the Australian 500 GP as Phillip Island. He finished in a point scoring 14th place.

Willis joined the BSL race team in 1999 to compete in the 500 GP World Championship. The bike suffered persistent mechanical problems and Willis only competed in one race at Jerez. Willis finished the season on a leased Modenas bike. He was consistently the fastest of the three Modenas riders, finishing six out of the last seven races.

In 2000, Willis competed in two rounds of the Endurance World Championship for the Yamaha Motor France team. Along with French teammates Jean-Marc Delétang and Fabien Foret, he won both the Spa 24 Hour and Bol D’Or 24 Hour races. He finished joint seventh in the Championship. Willis was also still with the BSL team in 500 GPs, but got little track time due to the bikes continuing development problems. He left the team and signed with Kenny Roberts Sr. to compete in four of the last five rounds of the season aboard the 3 cylinder Modenas.

Willis signed with the Pulse team in 500cc GP, alongside British teammate Jason Vincent in 2001. His best finish was 13th at Mugello, scoring three points. The team however withdrew from the series in July due to lack of funding.

Later in 2002, Willis entered one race in the Supersport World Championship for the Dutch Saveko Racing team aboard a Yamaha YZF R6, finished 16th at Sugo. In 2006, he competed in four rounds of the Australian NakedBike Championship finishing ninth in the series on board a BMW K1200R. In 2007, Willis competed in the Australian NakedBike Championship riding a Benelli TNT 1130 Sport.

== Career statistics ==
=== Grand Prix motorcycle racing ===
==== Races by year ====
Year	Class	Bike	1	2	3	4	5	6	7	8	9	10	11	12	13	14	15	16	Rank	Points
1998	500cc	Suzuki	JPN	MAL	ESP	ITA	FRA	MAD	NED	GBR	GER	CZE	IMO	CAT	AUS; 14	ARG			33rd	2
1999	500cc	BSL	MAL; DNQ	JPN	ESP; 18	FRA; DNQ	ITA; DNQ	CAT											30th	3
1999	500cc	Modenas KR3							NED; 17	GBR	GER; 16	CZE; 16	IMO; 17	VAL; Ret	AUS; 15	RSA; 16	BRA; 16	ARG; 14	30th	3
2000	500cc	Modenas KR3	RSA	MAL	JPN	ESP	FRA	ITA	CAT	NED	GBR	GER	CZE	POR; 15	VAL	BRA; 14	PAC; DNS	AUS; Ret	28th	3
2001	500cc	Pulse	JPN; Ret	RSA; 20	SPA; 19	FRA; Ret	ITA; 13	CAT; 18	NED; 16	GBR; 19	GER	CZE	POR	VAL	PAC	AUS	MAL	BRA	25th	3

=== Superbike World Championship ===
==== Races by year ====
(key) (Races in bold indicate pole position) (Races in italics indicate fastest lap)

Year	Bike	1		2		3		4		5		6		7		8		9		10		11		12		Pos	Pts
Year	Bike	R1	R2	R1	R2	R1	R2	R1	R2	R1	R2	R1	R2	R1	R2	R1	R2	R1	R2	R1	R2	R1	R2	R1	R2	Pos	Pts
1998	Suzuki	AUS; 6	AUS; 9	GBR	GBR	ITA	ITA	SPA	SPA	GER	GER	SMR	SMR	RSA	RSA	USA	USA	EUR	EUR	AUT	AUT	NED	NED	JPN	JPN	23rd	17

=== Supersport World Championship ===
==== Races by year ====
Year	Bike	1	2	3	4	5	6	7	8	9	10	11	12	Pos	Pts
2002	Yamaha	ESP	AUS	RSA	JPN; 16	ITA	GBR	GER	SMR	GBR	GER	NED	ITA	NC	0
