= César Barros (motorcyclist) =

Brazilian motorcycle racer

- Nationality: Brazilian
- Born: May 1, 1973 (age 53); São Paulo, Brazil
Motorcycle racing career statistics
250cc World Championship
Active years	2000–2001
Manufacturers	Honda, Yamaha
Starts / Wins / Podiums / Poles / F. laps / Points; 14 / 0 / 0 / 0 / 0 / 0
125cc World Championship
Active years	1997–1999
Manufacturers	Honda
Starts / Wins / Podiums / Poles / F. laps / Points; 2 / 0 / 0 / 0 / 0 / 0

César Barros (born May 1, 1973 in São Paulo) is a Brazilian former motorcycle racer.

He is the brother of Alex Barros.

== Career statistics ==
=== Grand Prix motorcycle racing ===
==== By season ====
Season	Class	Moto	Races	Win	Podiums	Pole	Pts	Position
1997	125cc	Honda	1	0	0	0	0	NC
1998	125cc	Honda	0	0	0	0	0	NC
1999	125cc	Honda	1	0	0	0	0	NC
2000	250cc	Honda	1	0	0	0	0	NC
2001	250cc	Yamaha	13	0	0	0	0	NC
Total			16	0	0	0	0	

==== Races by year ====
(key)

Year	Class	Bike	1	2	3	4	5	6	7	8	9	10	11	12	13	14	15	16	Pos.	Pts
1997	125cc	Honda	MAL	JPN	SPA	ITA	AUT	FRA	NED	IMO	GER	BRA; 22	GBR	CZE	CAT	INA	AUS		NC	0
1998	125cc	Honda	JPN	MAL	SPA	ITA	FRA	MAD	NED	GBR	GER	CZE	IMO	CAT	AUS	ARG; DNQ			NC	0
1999	125cc	Honda	MAL	JPN	SPA	FRA	ITA	CAT	NED	GBR	GER	CZE	IMO	VAL	AUS	RSA	BRA; 23	ARG	NC	0
2000	250cc	Honda	RSA	MAL	JPN	SPA	FRA	ITA	CAT	NED	GBR	GER	CZE	POR	VAL	BRA; Ret	PAC	AUS	NC	0
2001	250cc	Yamaha	JPN; DNQ	RSA; 21	SPA; 24	FRA; 25	ITA; Ret	CAT; DNS	NED; 25	GBR; 25	GER; Ret	CZE; 28	POR; Ret	VAL; 21	PAC; Ret	AUS; 16	MAL; DNS	BRA; 24	NC	0
