= Pacific Grand Prix (disambiguation) =

Pacific Grand Prix was a Formula One motor race.

Pacific Grand Prix may also refer to:

- Pacific Racing (also known as "Pacific Grand Prix"), a defunct Formula One team
- Pacific motorcycle Grand Prix
- The original (1960–1963) name of the Monterey Grand Prix
