= BSL 500 V3 =

Motorcycle

The BSL 500 V3 was a 500 cc two-stroke V3 which competed in the Grand Prix Motorcycle World Championship in 1999 and 2000. It was the brainchild of New Zealand businessman Bill Buckley, and was designed and built as a showcase for Buckley's engineering company. Its engine was designed in 3D CAD and manufactured using a rapid, patternless casting method, in which the CAD data was used to make ceramic moulds for the engine components. This process greatly reduced the time and expense associated with conventional methods of sand casting.

== 1999 ==
The BSL, in distinctive green and orange livery, made its debut at Round 1 of the world championship, the 1999 Malaysian Grand Prix. Two bikes, ridden by Australians Mark Willis and John Allen, both failed to qualify. The bike recorded its first result at Round 3, the Spanish Grand Prix, ridden by Willis, who finished 18th. It was a troubled year, however, as the bike regularly suffered mechanical problems. Willis failed to qualify for three out of the first four races entered, and the team decided from Round 10 at Brno to continue the season on a leased Modenas KR3, while continuing development of the BSL. On the leased machine, Willis scored 3 points and finished joint 27th in the Championship.

== 2000 ==
Development work continued over the winter of 1999 and throughout 2000, and the BSL again entered the 500 championship at selected rounds as a wild card entry. It was another bad year as the bike continued to be problematic and failed to score any points. Mark Willis once more rode for the team, but left when he was offered a ride with Modenas. New Zealand rider Stephen Briggs had a wildcard ride in the Pacific Grand Prix at Motegi but failed to qualify.

Although the BSL was granted wildcard status by the F.I.M. to any Grand Prix for the following season, it never raced in the 500 cc class again.

== Manufacturer ==
Buckley Systems Ltd Racing
Mt Wellington,
Auckland,
New Zealand.
