= 2000 Grand Prix motorcycle racing season =

Sports season

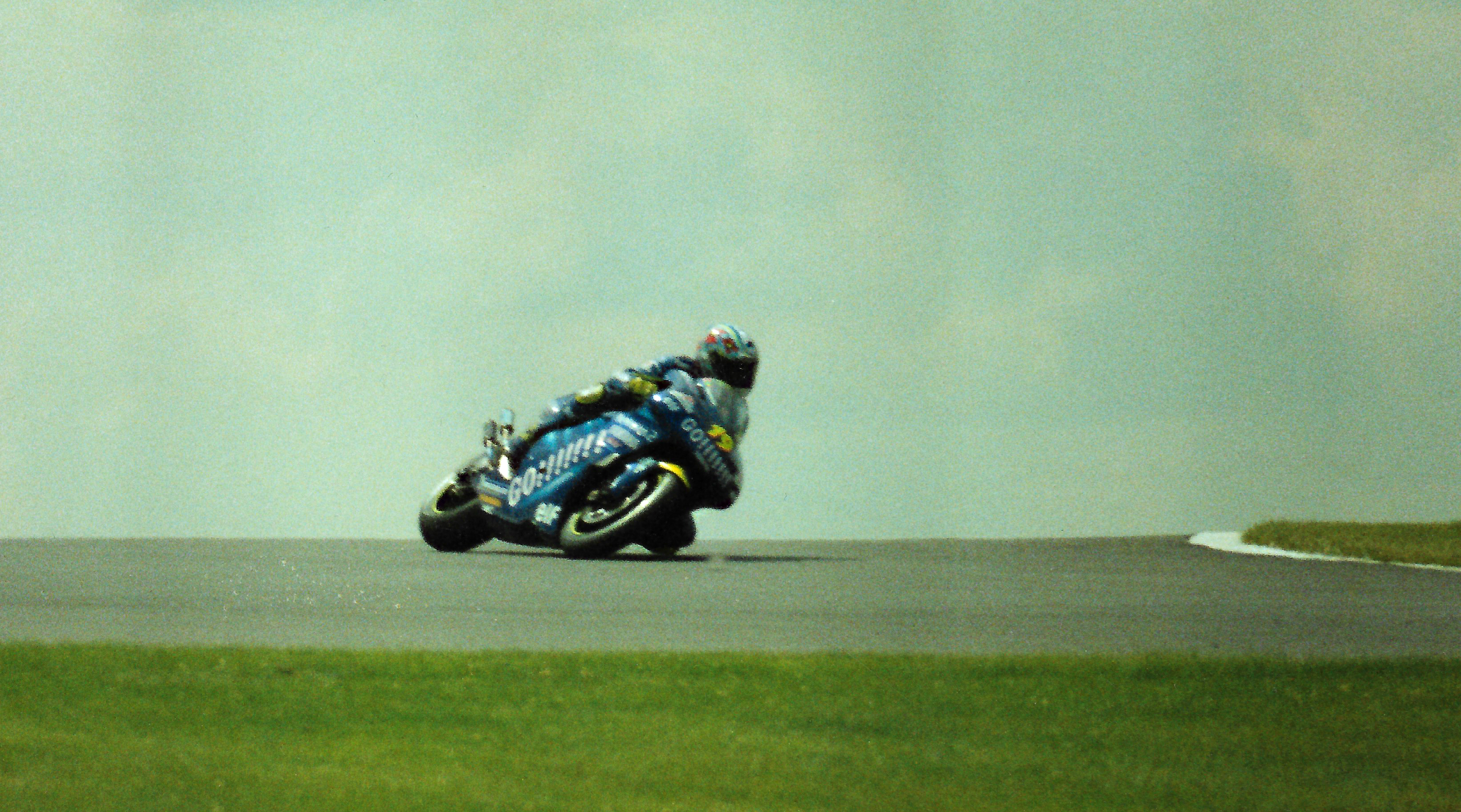
Olivier Jacque (pictured in 2002) became the 250cc champion

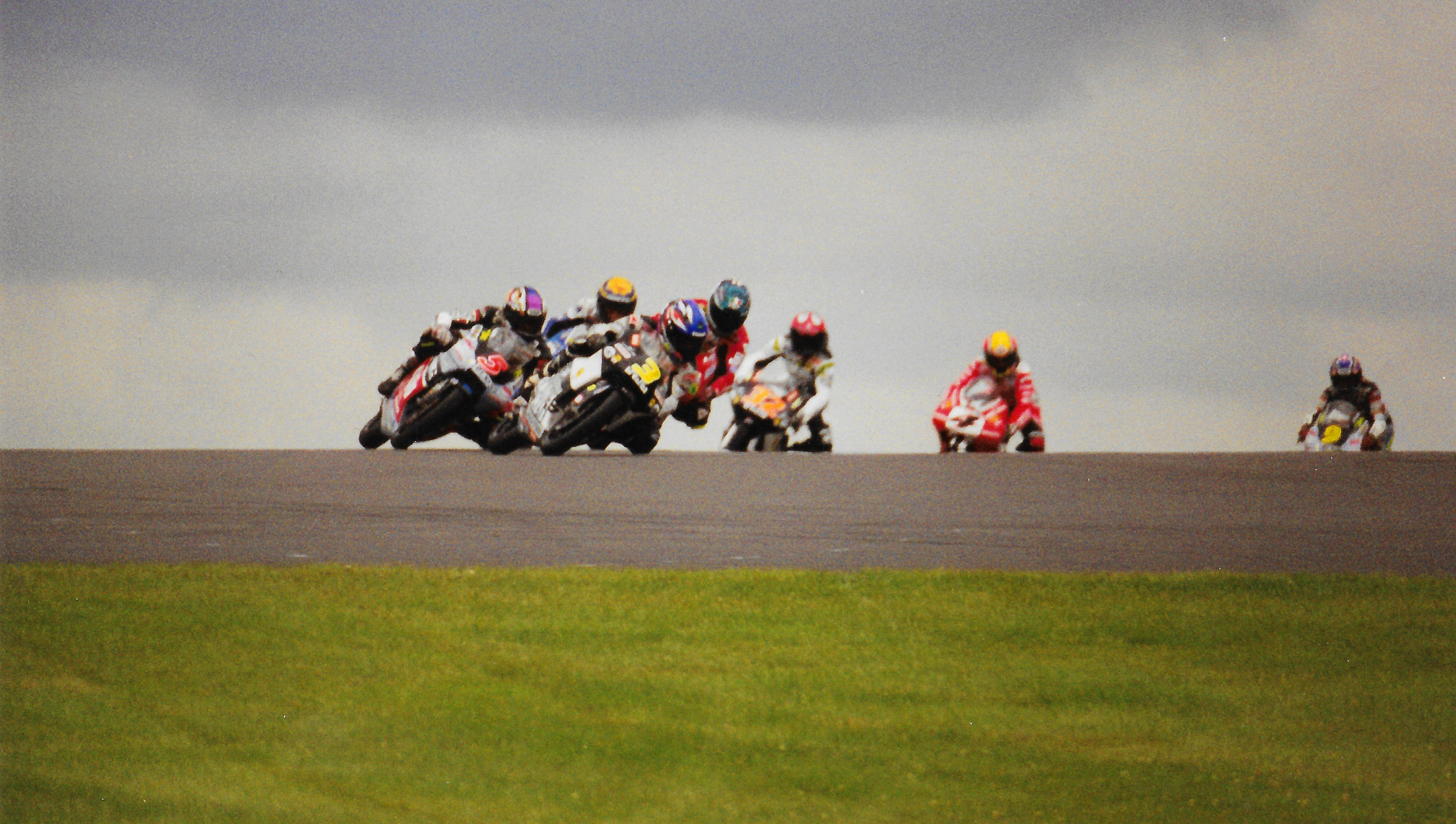
Roberto Locatelli (pictured at Donington Park) became the 125cc champion

The 2000 Grand Prix motorcycle racing season was the 52nd F.I.M. Road Racing World Championship season.

== Season summary ==
Kenny Roberts Jr. fulfilled the promise of his 2nd place in 1999 by winning the championship for 2000 with 2 races to spare. The season also saw the premier class-debut of Valentino Rossi, who began the year with crashes in the first two rounds and also had a third at Valencia; nonetheless, he came in second as a rookie in the class with 2 wins and 8 podiums. Garry McCoy achieved 3 wins with his spectacular 2-wheel sliding style, and his use of 16.5-inch (420 mm) tires began a general transition to that size, though it had been used previously in 500 cc by Kevin Schwantz. It was the last time a Suzuki rider clinched the title until Joan Mir secured his maiden title in 2020 edition.

Defending champion Àlex Crivillé had a disappointing season, bothered by an undetermined illness and a new NSR engine with a power curve that was difficult to manage. Said Jeremy Burgess: "In the middle of the corner, in the transition of getting back onto the power, the engine was weak, because all the power had gone to the top. You couldn't transfer the weight with the throttle from the front to the rear without feeling this weakness. That led to a tendency to over-open the throttle... and things would happen." By the third round, Honda started going back to much of the 1999 parts, though Rossi and Burgess decided to use the 2000 chassis with the 1999 engine.

== 2000 Grand Prix season calendar ==
The following Grands Prix were scheduled to take place in 2000:

Round	Date	Grand Prix	Circuit
1	19 March	(South Africa) Gauloises Africa's Grand Prix	Phakisa Freeway
2	2 April	(Malaysia) Malaysian Grand Prix	Sepang International Circuit
3	9 April	Marlboro Grand Prix of Japan	Suzuka Circuit
4	30 April	(Spain) Gran Premio Marlboro de España	Circuito Permanente de Jerez
5	14 May	Grand Prix Polini de France	Bugatti Circuit
6	28 May	(Italy) Gran Premio Cinzano d'Italia	Mugello Circuit
7	11 June	(Catalonia) Gran Premi Marlboro de Catalunya	Circuit de Catalunya
8	24 June ††	(Netherlands) Rizla Dutch TT	TT Circuit Assen
9	9 July	(United Kingdom) Cinzano British Grand Prix	Donington Park
10	23 July	(Germany) Cinzano Motorrad Grand Prix Deutschland	Sachsenring
11	20 August	(Czech Republic) Gauloises Grand Prix České Republiky	Brno Circuit
12	3 September	Grande Prémio Marlboro de Portugal	Autódromo do Estoril
13	17 September	(Valencian Community) Grand Prix Marlboro de la Comunitat Valenciana	Circuit de Valencia
14	7 October ††	(Rio de Janeiro (state)) Cinzano Rio Grand Prix	Autódromo Internacional Nelson Piquet
15	15 October	(Tochigi Prefecture) Pacific Grand Prix of Motegi	Twin Ring Motegi
16	29 October	(Australia) Qantas Australian Grand Prix	Phillip Island

†† = Saturday race

=== Calendar changes ===
- The South African Grand Prix was moved from 10 October to 19 March.
- The French Grand Prix moved from the Circuit Paul Ricard to the Bugatti Circuit in Le Mans' Bugatti Circuit.
- The Australian Grand Prix was moved back from 3 to 29 October.
- The Portuguese Grand Prix returned on the calendar since 1987 (when it was held on the Spanish Circuito Permanente de Jerez instead) after it was homologated for motorcycle racing.
- The Pacific Grand Prix was also added to the calendar; consequently the Japanese Grand Prix returned to Suzuka, as the Pacific Grand Prix was hosted as Motegi, an arrangement that lasted until 2003.
- The City of Imola Grand Prix and Argentine Grand Prix were taken off the calendar.

== 2000 Grand Prix season results ==
Round	Date	Grand Prix	Circuit	125cc winner	250cc winner	500cc winner	Report
1	19 March	(South Africa) South African motorcycle Grand Prix	Phakisa	(France) Arnaud Vincent	(Japan) Shinya Nakano	(Australia) Garry McCoy	Report
2	2 April	(Malaysia) Malaysian motorcycle Grand Prix	Sepang	(Italy) Roberto Locatelli	(Japan) Shinya Nakano	(United States) Kenny Roberts Jr.	Report
3	9 April	(Japan) Japanese motorcycle Grand Prix	Suzuka	(Japan) Youichi Ui	(Japan) Daijiro Kato	(Japan) Norick Abe	Report
4	30 April	(Spain) Spanish motorcycle Grand Prix	Jerez	(Spain) Emilio Alzamora	(Germany) Ralf Waldmann	(United States) Kenny Roberts Jr.	Report
5	14 May	(France) French motorcycle Grand Prix	Le Mans	(Japan) Youichi Ui	(Japan) Tohru Ukawa	(Spain) Àlex Crivillé	Report
6	28 May	(Italy) Italian motorcycle Grand Prix	Mugello	(Italy) Roberto Locatelli	(Japan) Shinya Nakano	(Italy) Loris Capirossi	Report
7	11 June	(Catalonia) Catalan motorcycle Grand Prix	Catalunya	(Italy) Simone Sanna	(France) Olivier Jacque	(United States) Kenny Roberts Jr.	Report
8	24 June ††	(Netherlands) Dutch TT	Assen	(Japan) Youichi Ui	(Japan) Tohru Ukawa	(Brazil) Alex Barros	Report
9	9 July	(United Kingdom) British motorcycle Grand Prix	Donington	(Japan) Youichi Ui	(Germany) Ralf Waldmann	(Italy) Valentino Rossi	Report
10	23 July	(Germany) German motorcycle Grand Prix	Sachsenring	(Japan) Youichi Ui	(France) Olivier Jacque	(Brazil) Alex Barros	Report
11	20 August	Czech Republic motorcycle Grand Prix	Brno	(Italy) Roberto Locatelli	(Japan) Shinya Nakano	(Italy) Max Biaggi	Report
12	3 September	(Portugal) Portuguese motorcycle Grand Prix	Estoril	(Spain) Emilio Alzamora	(Japan) Daijiro Kato	(Australia) Garry McCoy	Report
13	17 September	Valencian Community motorcycle Grand Prix	Valencia	(Italy) Roberto Locatelli	(Japan) Shinya Nakano	(Australia) Garry McCoy	Report
14	7 October ††	(Rio de Janeiro (state)) Rio de Janeiro motorcycle Grand Prix	Rio de Janeiro	(Italy) Simone Sanna	(Japan) Daijiro Kato	(Italy) Valentino Rossi	Report
15	15 October	(Tochigi Prefecture) Pacific motorcycle Grand Prix	Motegi	(Italy) Roberto Locatelli	(Japan) Daijiro Kato	(United States) Kenny Roberts Jr.	Report
16	29 October	(Australia) Australian motorcycle Grand Prix	Phillip Island	(Japan) Masao Azuma	(France) Olivier Jacque	(Italy) Max Biaggi	Report

†† = Saturday race

== Participants ==
=== 500cc participants ===
Team	Constructor	Motorcycle	Tyres	No.	Rider	Rounds
(Malaysia) / (United States) Proton Team KR	Modenas	KR3	D	11	(Spain) José David de Gea	1–8, 13
(Malaysia) / (United States) Proton Team KR	Modenas	KR3	D	30	(Australia) Anthony Gobert	9
(Malaysia) / (United States) Proton Team KR	Modenas	KR3	D	27	(Italy) Luca Cadalora	10–11
(Malaysia) / (United States) Proton Team KR	Modenas	KR3	MI	68	(Australia) Mark Willis	12, 14–16
(Italy) Aprilia Grand Prix Racing; Blu Aprilia Team	Aprilia	RSW-2 500	MI	31	(Japan) Tetsuya Harada	All
(Italy) Aprilia Grand Prix Racing; Blu Aprilia Team	Aprilia	RSW-2 500	MI	99	(United Kingdom) Jeremy McWilliams	All
(New Zealand) BSL	BSL	BSL 500 V3	MI	36	(New Zealand) Stephen Briggs	15–16
(Japan) Repsol YPF Honda Team	Honda	NSR500	MI	1	(Spain) Àlex Crivillé	All
(Japan) Repsol YPF Honda Team	Honda	NSR500	MI	5	(Spain) Sete Gibernau	All
(Japan) Repsol YPF Honda Team	Honda	NSR500	MI	8	(Japan) Tadayuki Okada	All
(Spain) Emerson Honda Pons	Honda	NSR500	MI	10	(Brazil) Alex Barros	All
(Spain) Emerson Honda Pons	Honda	NSR500	MI	65	(Italy) Loris Capirossi	All
(Japan) Nastro Azzurro Honda	Honda	NSR500	MI	46	(Italy) Valentino Rossi	All
(France) Tecmas Honda Elf	Honda	NSR500V	MI	22	(France) Sébastien Gimbert	1–4
(France) Tecmas Honda Elf	Honda	NSR500V	MI	18	(Belgium) Sebastien Le Grelle	5–14
(France) Tecmas Honda Elf	Honda	NSR500V	MI	56	(Japan) Tekkyu Kayoh	15–16
(United Kingdom) Sabre Sport	Honda	NSR500V	MI	12	(South Africa) Shane Norval	1–4, 7
(United Kingdom) Sabre Sport	Honda	NSR500V	MI	21	(United Kingdom) Ron Haslam	5
(United Kingdom) Sabre Sport	Honda	NSR500V	MI	23	(United Kingdom) Callum Ramsay	6
(United Kingdom) Sabre Sport	Honda	NSR500V	MI	20	(United Kingdom) Phil Giles	8–13
(United Kingdom) Sabre Sport	Honda	NSR500V	MI	33	(Spain) David Tomas	14–16
(Netherlands) Maxon Dee Cee Jeans	Honda	NSR500V	MI	25	(Spain) José Luis Cardoso	1–4, 6–7, 9–16
(United Kingdom) Demon Vimto Honda	Honda	NSR500V	MI	26	(United Kingdom) John McGuinness	9
(Spain) Queroseno Racing Team	Honda	NSR500V	MI	33	(Spain) David Tomás	13
(Italy) Team Paton	Paton	PG500RC	MI	43	(Italy) Paolo Tessari	6, 10–13
(Japan) Telefónica Movistar Suzuki	Suzuki	RGV500 (XRB0)	MI	2	(United States) Kenny Roberts Jr.	All
(Japan) Telefónica Movistar Suzuki	Suzuki	RGV500 (XRB0)	MI	9	(Japan) Nobuatsu Aoki	All
(Japan) Team Suzuki	Suzuki	RGV500 (XRB0)	MI	19	(Japan) Akira Ryō	3
(Japan) Technical Sports Racing; F.C.C. TSR	TSR-Honda	AC50M	MI	15	(Japan) Yoshiteru Konishi	1–9, 11–16
(Japan) Technical Sports Racing; F.C.C. TSR	TSR-Honda	AC50M	MI	56	(Japan) Tekkyu Kayoh	10
(Netherlands) Rizla Honda	TSR-Honda	AC50M	MI	17	(Netherlands) Jurgen van den Goorbergh	All
(Japan) Marlboro Yamaha Team	Yamaha	YZR500 (OWK6)	MI	4	(Italy) Max Biaggi	All
(Japan) Marlboro Yamaha Team	Yamaha	YZR500 (OWK6)	MI	7	(Spain) Carlos Checa	All
(United Kingdom) Red Bull Yamaha WCM	Yamaha	YZR500 (OWK6)	MI	24	(Australia) Garry McCoy	All
(United Kingdom) Red Bull Yamaha WCM	Yamaha	YZR500 (OWK6)	MI	55	(France) Régis Laconi	All
(Spain) Antena 3 Yamaha d'Antin	Yamaha	YZR500 (OWK6)	MI	6	(Japan) Norifumi Abe	All

Key
Regular Rider
Wildcard Rider
Replacement Rider

=== 250cc participants ===
Team	Constructor	Motorcycle	No.	Rider	Rounds
(Australia) Shell Advance Honda Team	Honda	Honda NSR250	4	(Japan) Tohru Ukawa	All
(Australia) Shell Advance Honda Team	Honda	Honda NSR250	14	(Australia) Anthony West	All
/ (Austria) Aprilia Germany	Aprilia	Aprilia RSV 250	6	(Germany) Ralf Waldmann	All
/ (Austria) Aprilia Germany	Aprilia	Aprilia RSV 250	26	(Germany) Klaus Nöhles	All
(Malaysia) Petronas Sprinta Team TVK	Yamaha	Yamaha YZR 250	8	(Japan) Naoki Matsudo	All
(Malaysia) Petronas Sprinta Team TVK	Yamaha	Yamaha YZR 250	18	(Malaysia) Shahrol Yuzy	All
(Germany) Edo Racing	Yamaha	Yamaha YZR 250	9	(Argentina) Sebastián Porto	All
(Spain) Antena 3 Yamaha d'Antin	Yamaha	Yamaha YZR 250	10	(Spain) Fonsi Nieto	All
(Spain) Antena 3 Yamaha d'Antin	Yamaha	Yamaha YZR 250	31	(Spain) Lucas Oliver Bultó	1–2, 4–16
(Spain) Antena 3 Yamaha d'Antin	Yamaha	Yamaha YZR 250	32	(Japan) Taro Sekiguchi	3
(Italy) Campetella Racing	Aprilia	Aprilia RSV 250	11	(Italy) Ivan Clementi	All
(Germany) Yamaha Kurz Aral	Yamaha	Yamaha YZR 250	12	(Germany) Mike Baldinger	1–3
(Germany) Yamaha Kurz Aral	Yamaha	Yamaha YZR 250	23	(France) Julien Allemand	4–16
(Germany) Yamaha Kurz Aral	Yamaha	Yamaha YZR 250	78	(Germany) Dirk Reissmann	10
(Italy) Aprilia Grand Prix Racing; Blu Aprilia Team	Aprilia	Aprilia RSV 250	13/35	(Italy) Marco Melandri	All
(Italy) Aprilia Grand Prix Racing; Blu Aprilia Team	Aprilia	Aprilia RSV 250	34	(Italy) Marcellino Lucchi	4, 6–7
(United Kingdom) QUB Team Optimum	Aprilia	Aprilia RSV 250	15	(United Kingdom) Adrian Coates	All
(United Kingdom) QUB Team Optimum	Aprilia	Aprilia RSV 250	77	(United Kingdom) Jamie Robinson	All
(Netherlands) Dee Cee Jeans Racing Team	TSR-Honda	Honda NSR250	16	(Sweden) Johan Stigefelt	All
(France) Chesterfield Yamaha Tech 3	Yamaha	Yamaha YZR 250	19	(France) Olivier Jacque	All
(France) Chesterfield Yamaha Tech 3	Yamaha	Yamaha YZR 250	56	(Japan) Shinya Nakano	All
(Spain) CC Valencia Airtel Aspar	Aprilia	Aprilia RSV 250	20	(Spain) Jerónimo Vidal	4, 7
(Spain) CC Valencia Airtel Aspar	Aprilia	Aprilia RSV 250	30	(Spain) Alex Debón	All
(Italy) Motoracing Battaini	Aprilia	Aprilia RSV 250	21	(Italy) Franco Battaini	All
(Italy) Tino Villa Racing	TSR-Honda	Honda NSR250	22	(France) Sébastien Gimbert	5–16
(Italy) Tino Villa Racing	TSR-Honda	Honda NSR250	44	(Italy) Roberto Rolfo	1–4
(United Kingdom) Padgetts M/C Sales	Aprilia	Aprilia RSV 250	24	(United Kingdom) Jason Vincent	All
(Italy) AXO Honda Gresini	TSR-Honda	Honda NSR250	25	(France) Vincent Philippe	1–6, 8–16
(Italy) AXO Honda Gresini	TSR-Honda	Honda NSR250	27	(Italy) Fabrizio de Marco	7
(Italy) AXO Honda Gresini	TSR-Honda	Honda NSR250	74	(Japan) Daijiro Kato	All
(Spain) PR2 - Circuito de Almería	Aprilia	Aprilia RSV 250	20	(Spain) Jerónimo Vidal	10–16
(Spain) PR2 - Circuito de Almería	Aprilia	Aprilia RSV 250	54	(Spain) David García	1–7
(Spain) PR2 - Circuito de Almería	Honda	Honda NSR250	33	(Spain) David Tomás	9
(Spain) Queroseno Racing Team	Honda	Honda NSR250	33	(Spain) David Tomás	7–8
(United Kingdom) D&B Bradgate	Honda	Honda NSR250	34	(United Kingdom) Gary Haslam	9
(Italy) Diesel Vasco Rossi Racing	Aprilia	Aprilia RSV 250	37	(Italy) Luca Boscoscuro	All
(Spain) Echo Racing Team	TSR-Honda	Honda NSR250	38	(Spain) Álvaro Molina	7, 12–13
(Spain) BRT-Ismael Bonilla	Honda	Honda NSR250	39	(Spain) Ismael Bonilla	4, 13
(Spain) Team Costa Azahar	Honda	Honda NSR250	40	(Spain) David Ortega	4
(Netherlands) Rizla Honda	TSR-Honda	Honda NSR250	41	(Netherlands) Jarno Janssen	All
(Italy) Team Fomma	TSR-Honda	Honda NSR250	42	(Spain) David Checa	All
(Germany) Racing Factory	Aprilia	Aprilia RSV 250	44	(Italy) Roberto Rolfo	7–10, 15–16
(Germany) Racing Factory	Aprilia	Aprilia RSV 250	66	(Germany) Alex Hofmann	1–6, 11–14
(Japan) FCC Castrol TSR	TSR-Honda	Honda NSR250	47	(Japan) Tekkyu Kayoh	3
(Japan) Team Kotake	Honda	Honda NSR250	48	(Japan) Shinichi Nakatomi	3, 15
(Japan) Motorex Daytona	Yamaha	Yamaha YZR 250	49	(Japan) Osamu Miyazaki	3, 15
(Japan) SP Tadao Racing Team	Yamaha	Yamaha YZR 250	50	(Japan) Nobuyuki Ohsaki	3
(Japan) Endurance	Honda	Honda NSR250	51	(Japan) Daisaku Sakai	3
Equipe de France	Honda	Honda NSR250	52	(France) Julien da Costa	5
Equipe de France	Honda	Honda NSR250	55	(France) Sylvain Guintoli	5
(France) Sport Moto Developpement	Yamaha	Yamaha YZR 250	53	(France) Éric Dubray	5
(France) Bentin Racing	Honda	Honda NSR250	57	(France) Hervé Mora	5
(France) Y.V.R.F.	Yamaha	Yamaha YZR 250	58	(France) Bruno Vecchioni	5
(Netherlands) Filart Racing	Honda	Honda NSR250	61	(Netherlands) Rob Filart	8
(Netherlands) MRTT Hugen Racing	Honda	Honda NSR250	62	(Netherlands) Jan Blok	8
(Netherlands) MRTT Hugen Racing	Honda	Honda NSR250	63	(Netherlands) Arnold Litjens	8
(Netherlands) Megacon	Honda	Honda NSR250	64	(Netherlands) Gert Pieper	8
(Brazil) Vaz Racing	Honda	Honda NSR250	67	(Brazil) César Barros	14
/ (Spain) BRT - Honda Brazil	Honda	Honda NSR250	68	(Brazil) Cristiano Vieira	14
(United Kingdom) Earnshaws Motorcycles	Honda	Honda NSR250	70	(United Kingdom) Tom Tunstall	9
(United Kingdom) Padgets Batley / Team Jacks	Honda	Honda NSR250	72	(United Kingdom) Lee Jackson	9
(United Kingdom) TW2 e-commerce Systems	Honda	Honda NSR250	73	(United Kingdom) Jason Davis	9
(Germany) Docshop Racing	Yamaha	Yamaha YZR 250	75	(Germany) Matthias Neukirchen	10
(Germany) Team Freudenberg	Yamaha	Yamaha YZR 250	76	(Germany) Dirk Heidolf	10
(Germany) Palatina Racing	Honda	Honda NSR250	79	(Germany) Andreas Göbel	10
(Germany) Kiefer GmbH Racing	Honda	Honda NSR250	80	(Germany) Christian Gemmel	10
(Czech Republic) Klub Racing Team Znojmo	Honda	Honda NSR250	81	(Czech Republic) Radomil Rous	11
(Slovakia) Slovnaft Sport Moto Team	Yamaha	Yamaha YZR 250	82	(Slovakia) Vladimír Častka	11
Remus Racing Austria	Honda	Honda NSR250	83	(Austria) Uwe Bolterauer	11
Remus Racing Austria	Honda	Honda NSR250	84	(Austria) Michael Witzeneder	11
(Portugal) Cose Da Mota/Moto Jornal	Yamaha	Yamaha YZR 250	85	(Portugal) Felisberto Teixeira	12
(Spain) VP Motos Ciclo Do Areeiro	Yamaha	Yamaha YZR 250	86	(Spain) Vicente Esparragoso	12
(Spain) Pablo Antelo RMT	Honda	Honda NSR250	87	(Spain) Pablo Antelo	12
(Japan) Team 2000 Penguin	Honda	Honda NSR250	88	(Japan) Yasumasa Hatakeyama	15
(Japan) Harc-Pro Honda	Honda	Honda NSR250	89	(Japan) Hiroshi Aoyama	15
(Japan) Sofukai Suzuka Racing/Meiw	Honda	Honda NSR250	90	(Japan) Yoshinori Korogi	15
(Australia) RGV Spares	Yamaha	Yamaha YZR 250	91	(Australia) Shaun Geronimi	16
(Australia) DMR	Honda	Honda NSR250	92	(Australia) Jason Boyle	16
(Australia) Clive Carter Motorcycles	Yamaha	Yamaha YZR 250	93	(Australia) Terry Carter	16
(Australia) Harding Print Racing	Yamaha	Yamaha YZR 250	94	(Australia) Steven Torresi	16

Key
Regular Rider
Wildcard Rider
Replacement Rider

=== 125cc participants ===
Team	Constructor	Motorcycle	No.	Rider	Rounds
(Spain) Telefónica Movistar Honda	Honda	Honda RS125R	1	(Spain) Emilio Alzamora	All
(Spain) Telefónica Movistar Honda	Honda	Honda RS125R	29	(Spain) Ángel Nieto Jr.	All
(Italy) Benetton Playlife Honda	Honda	Honda RS125R	3	(Japan) Masao Azuma	All
(Italy) Benetton Playlife Honda	Honda	Honda RS125R	32	(Italy) Mirko Giansanti	1–7, 9–15
(Italy) Benetton Playlife Honda	Honda	Honda RS125R	33	(Italy) Stefano Bianco	16
(Italy) Diesel Vasco Rossi Racing Aprilia	Aprilia	Aprilia RS125R	4	(Italy) Roberto Locatelli	All
(Italy) Diesel Vasco Rossi Racing Aprilia	Aprilia	Aprilia RS125R	16	(Italy) Simone Sanna	All
(Monaco) GiVi Honda LCR	Honda	Honda RS125R	5	(Japan) Noboru Ueda	All
(Monaco) GiVi Honda LCR	Honda	Honda RS125R	9	(Italy) Lucio Cecchinello	All
(Italy) Bossini Fontana Racing Aprilia	Aprilia	Aprilia RS125R	8	(Italy) Gianluigi Scalvini	All
(Italy) Antinucci Racing Team	Aprilia	Aprilia RS125R	10	(Spain) Adrián Araujo	1–3, 6
(Italy) Antinucci Racing Team	Honda	Honda RS125R	10	(Spain) Adrián Araujo	7–9, 11–13
(Italy) Antinucci Racing Team	Honda	Honda RS125R	34	(Andorra) Éric Bataille	10, 14–16
(Italy) Antinucci Racing Team	Honda	Honda RS125R	19	(Italy) Alessandro Brannetti	4–5
(Italy) Antinucci Racing Team	Honda	Honda RS125R	19	(Italy) Alessandro Brannetti	6
(Italy) Racing Service Honda	Honda	Honda RS125R	11	(Italy) Max Sabbatani	All
(France) SCRAB Compétition Aprilia	Aprilia	Aprilia RS125R	12	(France) Randy de Puniet	All
(Italy) Chupa Chups Matteoni Rg. Honda	Honda	Honda RS125R	15	(San Marino) Alex de Angelis	All
(Italy) Chupa Chups Matteoni Rg. Honda	Honda	Honda RS125R	18	(Spain) Toni Elías	All
(Italy) Chupa Chups Matteoni Rg. Honda	Honda	Honda RS125R	66	(Italy) Alex Baldolini	6
(Germany) ADAC Sachsen Honda	Honda	Honda RS125R	17	(Germany) Steve Jenkner	All
(Spain) Circuito Valencia Aspar Aprilia	Aprilia	Aprilia RS125R	21	(France) Arnaud Vincent	All
(Spain) Circuito Valencia Aspar Aprilia	Aprilia	Aprilia RS125R	44	(Spain) Héctor Faubel	4, 13
(Spain) Festina Derbi	Derbi	Derbi 125 GP	22	(Spain) Pablo Nieto	All
(Spain) Festina Derbi	Derbi	Derbi 125 GP	41	(Japan) Youichi Ui	All
(Spain) Festina Derbi	Derbi	Derbi 125 GP	54	(San Marino) Manuel Poggiali	1, 3–16
(Germany) LAE UGT 3000 Aprilia	Aprilia	Aprilia RS125R	23	(Italy) Gino Borsoi	All
(Italy) Italjet Moto	Italjet	Italjet F125	24	(United Kingdom) Leon Haslam	All
(Italy) Italjet Moto	Italjet	Italjet F125	39	(Czech Republic) Jaroslav Huleš	1–14
(Italy) Italjet Moto	Italjet	Italjet F125	67	(Switzerland) Marco Tresoldi	15–16
(Italy) Fomma Honda	Honda	Honda RS125R	26	(Italy) Ivan Goi	All
(Spain) Queroseno Racing Team Honda	Honda	Honda RS125R	34	(Andorra) Éric Bataille	7–9, 12–13
(Germany) RS ADAC Esch Racing Honda	Honda	Honda RS125R	35	(Germany) Reinhard Stolz	All
(Spain) Promoto Sport	Aprilia	Aprilia RS125R	43	(Spain) David Micó	4, 13
(Spain) Team Boydis-Beatriz Hoteles	Aprilia	Aprilia RS125R	45	(Spain) Iván Martínez	4, 7
(Spain) Analco-3C Racing	Aprilia	Aprilia RS125R	47	(Spain) Ángel Rodríguez	7, 13
Siam Yamaha Thailand	Yamaha	Yamaha TZ125	48	(Thailand) Decha Kraisart	2
Honda Castrol Thailand	Honda	Honda RS125R	49	(Thailand) Suhathai Chaemsap	2
(Spain) T.M.R. Competicion	Honda	Honda RS125R	50	(Spain) Joaquín Perera	7
(Italy) Semprucci Biesse Aprilia	Aprilia	Aprilia RS125R	39	(Czech Republic) Jaroslav Huleš	16
(Italy) Semprucci Biesse Aprilia	Aprilia	Aprilia RS125R	51	(Italy) Marco Petrini	1–15
(Italy) Semprucci Biesse Aprilia	Aprilia	Aprilia RS125R	53	(San Marino) William de Angelis	All
(Brazil) Calabrezzi Racing Team	Honda	Honda RS125R	52	(Brazil) Gian Calabrezzi	14
(Japan) JHA Racing	Honda	Honda RS125R	55	(Japan) Hideyuki Nakajō	3
(Japan) JHA Racing	Honda	Honda RS125R	95	(Japan) Noboyuki Yonoki	15
(Japan) JHA Racing	Honda	Honda RS125R	97	(Japan) Naoki Katoh	15
(Japan) Team Plus One	Honda	Honda RS125R	56	(Japan) Yuzo Fujioka	3
(Japan) Team Plus One	NER Honda	Honda RS125R	56	(Japan) Yuzo Fujioka	15
(Japan) ACT Corp - Team Wheelie	Honda	Honda RS125R	57	(Japan) Hiroyuki Kikuchi	3
(Japan) JRacing Motul	Yamaha	Yamaha TZ125	58	(Japan) Katsuji Uezu	3
(Japan) Tec - 2BP	Yamaha	Yamaha TZ125	59	(Japan) Shinichi Sugaya	3
(France) R.M.S.	Honda	Honda RS125R	60	(France) Lionel Lecomte	5
(France) R.M.S.	Honda	Honda RS125R	63	(France) Jimmy Petit	5
(France) Provence Moto Sport	Aprilia	Aprilia RS125R	61	(France) Grégory Lefort	5
(France) Riom Racing Team	Yamaha	Yamaha TZ125	62	(France) Erwan Nigon	5
(France) H.R.C.	Honda	Honda RS125R	64	(France) Hugo Marchand	5
(Netherlands) EP Bos Electro Elbing	Honda	Honda RS125R	65	(Netherlands) Harold de Haan	8
(Switzerland) BMT Swiss Team	Honda	Honda RS125R	67	(Switzerland) Marco Tresoldi	6
(Netherlands) Luvro-van Leeuwen Motortechniek	Honda	Honda RS125R	68	(Netherlands) Willem van Leeuwen	8
(Netherlands) Doodeman Dakdekkers	Honda	Honda RS125R	69	(Netherlands) Ronnie Timmer	8
(Netherlands) Roteg Racing	Honda	Honda RS125R	70	(Netherlands) Patrick Lakerveld	8
(United Kingdom) Connolly Transport Racing	Honda	Honda RS125R	71	(United Kingdom) Paul Robinson	9
(United Kingdom) Rheos Honda UK	Honda	Honda RS125R	72	(United Kingdom) Kenny Tibble	9
(United Kingdom) Demon Vimto Honda	Honda	Honda RS125R	73	(United Kingdom) Stuart Easton	9
ADAC Junior Team Germany	Honda	Honda RS125R	74	(Germany) Jarno Müller	10
(Germany) Ivetra Seel Racing	Honda	Honda RS125R	75	(Germany) Achim Kariger	10
(Germany) Yamaha Kurz Aral	Yamaha	Yamaha TZ125	76	(Germany) Jascha Büch	10
TSR Hegemann Germany	Honda	Honda RS125R	77	(Germany) Andreas Hahn	10
(Germany) Budweiser Budvar Elit Team Hanusch	Honda	Honda RS125R	78	(Czech Republic) Jakub Smrž	10–11
(Czech Republic) AMK Revena Team 2000	Honda	Honda RS125R	79	(Czech Republic) Igor Kaláb	11
(Czech Republic) Orion Team Litomysl	Honda	Honda RS125R	80	(Czech Republic) Michal Březina	11
(Hungary) Kent Clips Team	Honda	Honda RS125R	81	(Hungary) László Báncsiki	11
(Hungary) Pannonia Racing	Honda	Honda RS125R	82	(Hungary) Gábor Talmácsi	11
(Portugal) Team Modeka	Honda	Honda RS125R	83	(Portugal) Emmanuel Carvalho	12
(Portugal) Honda Galp Racing Team	Honda	Honda RS125R	84	(Portugal) José Leite	12
(Portugal) Pgp Mavi	Yamaha	Yamaha TZ125	85	(Portugal) Manuel Vieira	12
(Portugal) VP Motos Ciclo Do Areeiro	Aprilia	Aprilia RS125R	86	(Portugal) Paulo Henriques	12
(Brazil) Alemao Rodas Team	Honda	Honda RS125R	87	(Brazil) Wesley Gutierrez	14
(Brazil) Gota Dourada Team	Honda	Honda RS125R	89	(Brazil) Renato Velludo	14
(Brazil) Panadés Disnauto Team	Honda	Honda RS125R	90	(Brazil) Leandro Panadés	14
(Australia) Team Taylor Racing	Honda	Honda RS125R	91	(Australia) Jay Taylor	16
(Australia) MCA Supermarkets/Brookes Racing	Honda	Honda RS125R	92	(Australia) Josh Brookes	16
(Australia) Fairbairn Cranes/Tenniswood Racing	Honda	Honda RS125R	94	(Australia) Michael Teniswood	16
(Japan) SP Tadao Racing Team	Yamaha	Yamaha TZ125	96	(Japan) Tomoyoshi Koyama	15
(Japan) Team Harc-Pro	Honda	Honda RS125R	98	(Japan) Masafumi Ono	15

Key
Regular Rider
Wildcard Rider
Replacement Rider

== Standings ==
=== 500cc riders' standings ===
Scoring system

Points were awarded to the top fifteen finishers. A rider had to finish the race to earn points.

Position	**1st**	**2nd**	**3rd**	**4th**	**5th**	**6th**	**7th**	**8th**	**9th**	**10th**	**11th**	**12th**	**13th**	**14th**	**15th**
Points	25	20	16	13	11	10	9	8	7	6	5	4	3	2	1

Pos	Rider	Bike	RSA (South Africa)	MAL (Malaysia)	JPN (Japan)	ESP (Spain)	FRA (France)	ITA (Italy)	CAT (Catalonia)	NED (Netherlands)	GBR (United Kingdom)	GER (Germany)	CZE (Czech Republic)	POR (Portugal)	VAL (Valencian Community)	RIO (Rio de Janeiro (state))	PAC (Tochigi Prefecture)	AUS (Australia)	Pts
1	(United States) Kenny Roberts Jr.	Suzuki	6	**1**	**2**	1	6	6	1	Ret	2	**3**	4	2	**2**	6	1	7	258
2	(Italy) Valentino Rossi	Honda	Ret	Ret	11	3	3	12	3	6	1	2	2	3	Ret	1	2	3	209
3	(Italy) Max Biaggi	Yamaha	Ret	4	Ret	**Ret**	**Ret**	9	5	4	9	4	**1**	4	3	**5**	**3**	1	170
4	(Brazil) Alex Barros	Honda	4	8	7	5	5	**Ret**	**Ret**	1	**14**	1	Ret	10	5	2	7	4	163
5	(Australia) Garry McCoy	Yamaha	1	3	9	Ret	4	Ret	16	15	17	10	3	**1**	1	3	Ret	5	161
6	(Spain) Carlos Checa	Yamaha	2	2	5	2	7	2	Ret	5	11	9	11	12	7	15	4	Ret	155
7	(Italy) Loris Capirossi	Honda	3	Ret	12	6	8	1	6	**3**	4	6	5	13	Ret	Ret	8	2	154
8	(Japan) Norifumi Abe	Yamaha	7	17	1	Ret	2	5	2	10	6	11	Ret	9	Ret	4	5	6	147
9	(Spain) Àlex Crivillé	Honda	5	Ret	6	4	1	Ret	Ret	2	7	Ret	7	6	Ret	11	6	Ret	122
10	(Japan) Nobuatsu Aoki	Suzuki	8	5	4	7	11	4	4	13	16	13	8	Ret	4	12	9	10	116
11	(Japan) Tadayuki Okada	Honda	Ret	6	3	10	14	8	15	11	10	5	10	7	9	9	10	9	107
12	(France) Régis Laconi	Yamaha	9	9	14	8	9	7	13	8	12	7	13	5	6	8	11	11	106
13	(Netherlands) Jurgen van den Goorbergh	TSR-Honda	10	11	13	9	13	11	7	9	5	Ret	12	8	10	10	15	12	85
14	(United Kingdom) Jeremy McWilliams	Aprilia	Ret	10	8	Ret	12	3	12	Ret	3	Ret	9	11	Ret	Ret	14	**8**	76
15	(Spain) Sete Gibernau	Honda	**Ret**	7	Ret	Ret	15	10	Ret	7	8	8	6	Ret	8	7	12	Ret	72
16	(Japan) Tetsuya Harada	Aprilia	Ret	12	Ret	11	10	Ret	9	12	Ret	Ret	14	14	Ret	13	13	14	38
17	(Spain) José David de Gea	Modenas KR3	15	14	15	12	16	Ret	8	14					11				23
18	(Spain) José Luis Cardoso	Honda	11	13	Ret	Ret		13	DNS		Ret	12	16	16	12	16	DNQ	DNQ	19
19	(Japan) Yoshiteru Konishi	TSR-Honda	13	Ret	16	13	Ret	15	10	Ret	DNQ		20	17	14	18	18	15	16
20	(Belgium) Sébastien Le Grelle	Honda					17	14	11	Ret	18	DNQ	18	18	Ret	DNQ			7
21	(Japan) Akira Ryō	Suzuki			10														6
22	(France) Sébastien Gimbert	Honda	12	15	17	Ret													5
23	(South Africa) Shane Norval	Honda	14	16	18	Ret			14										4
24	(United Kingdom) John McGuinness	Honda									13								3
25	(Spain) David Tomás	Honda													13	17	17	Ret	3
26	(Japan) Tekkyu Kayo	TSR-Honda										DNS							3
26	(Japan) Tekkyu Kayo	Honda															16	13	3
27	(Italy) Luca Cadalora	Modenas KR3										14	15						3
28	(Australia) Mark Willis	Modenas KR3												15		14	DNS	Ret	3
29	(Australia) Anthony Gobert	Modenas KR3									15								1
30	(Italy) Paolo Tessari	Paton						Ret				15	17	Ret	Ret				1
31	(United Kingdom) Phil Giles	Honda								Ret	Ret	DNQ	19	19	15				1
	(United Kingdom) Callum Ramsay	Honda						Ret											0
	(United Kingdom) Ron Haslam	Honda					DNS												0
	(New Zealand) Stephen Briggs	BSL															DNQ	DNQ	0
Pos	Rider	Team	RSA (South Africa)	MAL (Malaysia)	JPN (Japan)	ESP (Spain)	FRA (France)	ITA (Italy)	CAT (Catalonia)	NED (Netherlands)	GBR (United Kingdom)	GER (Germany)	CZE (Czech Republic)	POR (Portugal)	VAL (Valencian Community)	RIO (Rio de Janeiro (state))	PAC (Tochigi Prefecture)	AUS (Australia)	Pts

Colour	Result
Gold	Winner
Silver	Second place
Bronze	Third place
Green	Points classification
Blue	Non-points classification
Blue	Non-classified finish (NC)
Purple	Retired, not classified (Ret)
Red	Did not qualify (DNQ)
Red	Did not pre-qualify (DNPQ)
Black	Disqualified (DSQ)
White	Did not start (DNS)
White	Withdrew (WD)
White	Race cancelled (C)
Blank	Did not practice (DNP)
Blank	Did not arrive (DNA)
Blank	Excluded (EX)

**Bold** – Pole
Italics – Fastest Lap
Light blue – Rookie

=== 500cc manufacturers' standings ===
Pos	Manufacturer	RSA (South Africa)	MAL (Malaysia)	JPN (Japan)	ESP (Spain)	FRA (France)	ITA (Italy)	CAT (Catalonia)	NED (Netherlands)	GBR (United Kingdom)	GER (Germany)	CZE (Czech Republic)	POR (Portugal)	VAL (Valencian Community)	RIO (Rio de Janeiro (state))	PAC (Tochigi Prefecture)	AUS (Australia)	Pts
1	(Japan) Yamaha	1	2	1	2	2	2	2	4	6	4	1	1	1	3	3	1	318
2	(Japan) Honda	3	6	3	3	1	1	3	1	1	1	2	3	5	1	2	2	311
3	(Japan) Suzuki	6	1	2	1	6	4	1	13	2	3	4	2	2	6	1	7	264
4	(Italy) Aprilia	Ret	10	8	11	10	3	9	12	3	Ret	9	11	Ret	13	13	8	94
5	(Japan) TSR-Honda	10	11	13	9	13	11	7	9	5	Ret	12	8	10	10	15	12	85
6	(Malaysia) Modenas KR3	15	14	15	12	16	Ret	8	14	15	14	15	15	11	14	DNS	Ret	30
7	(Italy) Paton						Ret				15	17	Ret	Ret				1
	(New Zealand) BSL															DNQ	DNQ	0
Pos	Manufacturer	RSA (South Africa)	MAL (Malaysia)	JPN (Japan)	ESP (Spain)	FRA (France)	ITA (Italy)	CAT (Catalonia)	NED (Netherlands)	GBR (United Kingdom)	GER (Germany)	CZE (Czech Republic)	POR (Portugal)	VAL (Valencian Community)	RIO (Rio de Janeiro (state))	PAC (Tochigi Prefecture)	AUS (Australia)	Pts

=== 250cc riders' standings ===
Scoring system

Points were awarded to the top fifteen finishers. A rider had to finish the race to earn points.

Position	**1st**	**2nd**	**3rd**	**4th**	**5th**	**6th**	**7th**	**8th**	**9th**	**10th**	**11th**	**12th**	**13th**	**14th**	**15th**
Points	25	20	16	13	11	10	9	8	7	6	5	4	3	2	1

Pos	Rider	Bike	RSA (South Africa)	MAL (Malaysia)	JPN (Japan)	ESP (Spain)	FRA (France)	ITA (Italy)	CAT (Catalonia)	NED (Netherlands)	GBR (United Kingdom)	GER (Germany)	CZE (Czech Republic)	POR (Portugal)	VAL (Valencian Community)	RIO (Rio de Janeiro (state))	PAC (Tochigi Prefecture)	AUS (Australia)	Pts
1	(France) Olivier Jacque	Yamaha	4	2	4	4	3	2	1	2	**2**	**1**	**3**	**2**	**2**	Ret	4	1	279
2	(Japan) Shinya Nakano	Yamaha	**1**	1	3	15	2	1	**3**	3	7	3	1	Ret	1	4	2	**2**	272
3	(Japan) Daijiro Kato	Honda	2	3	**1**	2	**6**	3	4	8	10	4	6	1	5	1	**1**	3	259
4	(Japan) Tohru Ukawa	Honda	3	**Ret**	2	3	1	6	2	1	4	2	2	Ret	4	2	5	6	239
5	(Italy) Marco Melandri	Aprilia	13	5	5	6	4	4	6	Ret	Ret	Ret	4	3	3	**3**	3	5	159
6	(Australia) Anthony West	Honda	5	6	6	5	5	7	9	4	Ret	10	10	4	7	5	6	7	146
7	(Germany) Ralf Waldmann	Aprilia	7	4	Ret	**1**	8	Ret	7	**24**	1	8	5	Ret	13	6	7	4	143
8	(Italy) Franco Battaini	Aprilia	6	13	7	10	11	5	5	20	Ret	7	7	12	6	7	Ret	DNS	96
9	(Argentina) Sebastián Porto	Yamaha	8	8	12	9	10	Ret	Ret	7	11	9	8	Ret	8	8	Ret	11	83
10	(Japan) Naoki Matsudo	Yamaha	10	11	DSQ	Ret	7	8	8	5	3	14	11	Ret	15	12	16	12	79
11	(United Kingdom) Jason Vincent	Aprilia	9	12	16	12	Ret	Ret	19	19	5	21	Ret	7	9	9	9	8	64
12	(Germany) Klaus Nöhles	Aprilia	14	Ret	13	8	14	Ret	15	18	16	5	9	5	Ret	17	Ret	DNS	45
13	(Italy) Luca Boscoscuro	Aprilia	Ret	7	11	11	9	Ret	Ret	22	Ret	15	15	14	12	10	13	15	45
14	(Spain) Fonsi Nieto	Yamaha	Ret	Ret	22	16	16	9	18	16	18	12	Ret	6	17	11	14	9	35
15	(Spain) Álex Debón	Aprilia	12	9	Ret	14	15	Ret	Ret	Ret	6	Ret	Ret	Ret	11	Ret	12	18	32
16	(Italy) Roberto Rolfo	TSR-Honda	15	14	Ret	19													26
16	(Italy) Roberto Rolfo	Aprilia							Ret	9	Ret	6					Ret	10	26
17	(Sweden) Johan Stigefelt	TSR-Honda	Ret	15	18	13	12	Ret	11	21	8	11	DNS	DNS	Ret	Ret	19	17	26
18	(Malaysia) Shahrol Yuzy	Yamaha	Ret	18	19	Ret	13	11	20	Ret	Ret	18	12	10	14	Ret	11	19	24
19	(Spain) David Checa	TSR-Honda	16	Ret	23	18	Ret	13	13	15	9	19	13	Ret	10	Ret	15	20	23
20	(United Kingdom) Jamie Robinson	Aprilia	11	Ret	Ret	Ret	Ret	Ret	10	6	Ret	Ret	15	15	19	Ret	Ret	DNS	23
21	(Italy) Ivan Clementi	Aprilia	Ret	Ret	Ret	Ret	19	10	Ret	23	Ret	16	17	8	21	13	DNS	16	17
22	(France) Sébastien Gimbert	TSR-Honda					21	Ret	16	12	Ret	13	18	9	Ret	14	18	Ret	16
23	(France) Vincent Philippe	TSR-Honda	Ret	17	DNS	Ret	Ret	WD		10	14	Ret	16	13	16	16	Ret	13	14
24	(France) Julien Allemand	Yamaha				24	Ret	12	22	11	15	17	21	16	20	15	Ret	14	13
25	(Germany) Alex Hofmann	Aprilia	Ret	10	15	17	18	Ret					19	11	18	DNS			12
26	(Italy) Marcellino Lucchi	Aprilia				7		**Ret**	Ret										9
27	(Japan) Osamu Miyazaki	Yamaha			8												DSQ		8
28	(Japan) Hiroshi Aoyama	Honda															8		8
29	(Japan) Shinichi Nakatomi	Honda			9												Ret		7
30	(Spain) Lucas Oliver Bultó	Yamaha	Ret	Ret		23	20	Ret	17	13	12	22	20	17	22	20	Ret	21	7
31	(Japan) Yasumasa Hatakeyama	Honda															10		6
32	(Japan) Nobuyuki Ohsaki	Yamaha			10														6
33	(Netherlands) Jarno Janssen	TSR-Honda	17	16	21	Ret	17	Ret	12	Ret	17	Ret	Ret	Ret	24	19	Ret	22	4
34	(United Kingdom) Gary Haslam	Honda									13								3
35	(Japan) Taro Sekiguchi	Yamaha			14														2
36	(United Kingdom) Adrian Coates	Aprilia	Ret	Ret	Ret	21	Ret	14	21	Ret	Ret	24	22	Ret	23	18	DNS	Ret	2
37	(Spain) Jerónimo Vidal	Aprilia				22			14			26	Ret	Ret	Ret	21	DNS	Ret	2
38	(Spain) David Tomás	Honda							Ret	14	Ret								2
	(Japan) Yoshinori Korogi	Honda															17		0
	(Netherlands) Arnold Litjens	Honda								17									0
	(Japan) Tekkyu Kayoh	TSR-Honda			17														0
	(Portugal) Felisberto Teixeira	Yamaha												18					0
	(Germany) Mike Baldinger	Yamaha	18	19	DNS														0
	(United Kingdom) Jason Davis	Honda									19								0
	(Spain) Álvaro Molina	TSR-Honda							Ret					19	Ret				0
	(Germany) Dirk Heidolf	Yamaha										20							0
	(Japan) Daisaku Sakai	Honda			20														0
	(Spain) David García	Aprilia	Ret	Ret	DNS	20	Ret	Ret	Ret										0
	(France) Julien da Costa	Honda					22												0
	(Slovakia) Vladimír Častka	Yamaha											23						0
	(Germany) Dirk Reissmann	Yamaha										23							0
	(France) Bruno Vecchioni	Yamaha					23												0
	(Austria) Michael Witzeneder	Honda											24						0
	(France) Éric Dubray	Yamaha					24												0
	(Czech Republic) Radomil Rous	Honda											25						0
	(Germany) Matthias Neukirchnen	Yamaha										25							0
	(Netherlands) Gert Pieper	Honda								25									0
	(Spain) David Ortega	Honda				25													0
	(Germany) Andreas Göbel	Honda										27							0
	(Australia) Shaun Geronimi	Yamaha																Ret	0
	(Australia) Terry Carter	Yamaha																Ret	0
	(Brazil) César Barros	Honda														Ret			0
	(Brazil) Cristiano Vieira	Honda														Ret			0
	(Spain) Ismael Bonilla	Honda				Ret									Ret				0
	(Austria) Uwe Bolterauer	Honda											Ret						0
	(Germany) Christian Gemmel	Honda										Ret							0
	(United Kingdom) Lee Jackson	Honda									Ret								0
	(United Kingdom) Tom Tunstall	Honda									Ret								0
	(Netherlands) Jan Blok	Honda								Ret									0
	(Netherlands) Rob Filart	Honda								Ret									0
	(France) Hervé Mora	Honda					Ret												0
	(France) Sylvain Guintoli	Honda					Ret												0
	(Australia) Jason Boyle	Honda																DNQ	
	(Australia) Steven Torresi	Yamaha																DNQ	
	(Spain) Pablo Antelo	Honda												DNQ					
	(Spain) Vicente Esparragoso	Yamaha												DNQ					
	(Italy) Fabrizio De Marco	Honda							DNQ										
Pos	Rider	Team	RSA (South Africa)	MAL (Malaysia)	JPN (Japan)	ESP (Spain)	FRA (France)	ITA (Italy)	CAT (Catalonia)	NED (Netherlands)	GBR (United Kingdom)	GER (Germany)	CZE (Czech Republic)	POR (Portugal)	VAL (Valencian Community)	RIO (Rio de Janeiro (state))	PAC (Tochigi Prefecture)	AUS (Australia)	Pts

Colour	Result
Gold	Winner
Silver	Second place
Bronze	Third place
Green	Points classification
Blue	Non-points classification
Blue	Non-classified finish (NC)
Purple	Retired, not classified (Ret)
Red	Did not qualify (DNQ)
Red	Did not pre-qualify (DNPQ)
Black	Disqualified (DSQ)
White	Did not start (DNS)
White	Withdrew (WD)
White	Race cancelled (C)
Blank	Did not practice (DNP)
Blank	Did not arrive (DNA)
Blank	Excluded (EX)

**Bold** – Pole
Italics – Fastest Lap

=== 250cc manufacturers' standings ===
Pos	Manufacturer	RSA (South Africa)	MAL (Malaysia)	JPN (Japan)	ESP (Spain)	FRA (France)	ITA (Italy)	CAT (Catalonia)	NED (Netherlands)	GBR (United Kingdom)	GER (Germany)	CZE (Czech Republic)	POR (Portugal)	VAL (Valencian Community)	RIO (Rio de Janeiro (state))	PAC (Tochigi Prefecture)	AUS (Australia)	Pts
1	(Japan) Yamaha	1	1	3	4	2	1	1	2	2	1	1	2	1	4	2	1	342
2	(Japan) Honda	2	3	1	2	1	3	2	1	4	2	2	1	4	1	1	3	324
3	(Italy) Aprilia	6	4	5	1	4	4	5	6	1	5	4	3	3	3	3	4	232
4	(Japan) TSR-Honda	15	14	17	13	12	13	11	10	8	11	13	9	10	14	15	13	59
Pos	Manufacturer	RSA (South Africa)	MAL (Malaysia)	JPN (Japan)	ESP (Spain)	FRA (France)	ITA (Italy)	CAT (Catalonia)	NED (Netherlands)	GBR (United Kingdom)	GER (Germany)	CZE (Czech Republic)	POR (Portugal)	VAL (Valencian Community)	RIO (Rio de Janeiro (state))	PAC (Tochigi Prefecture)	AUS (Australia)	Pts

=== 125cc riders' standings ===
Scoring system

Points were awarded to the top fifteen finishers. A rider had to finish the race to earn points.

Position	**1st**	**2nd**	**3rd**	**4th**	**5th**	**6th**	**7th**	**8th**	**9th**	**10th**	**11th**	**12th**	**13th**	**14th**	**15th**
Points	25	20	16	13	11	10	9	8	7	6	5	4	3	2	1

Pos	Rider	Bike	RSA (South Africa)	MAL (Malaysia)	JPN (Japan)	ESP (Spain)	FRA (France)	ITA (Italy)	CAT (Catalonia)	NED (Netherlands)	GBR (United Kingdom)	GER (Germany)	CZE (Czech Republic)	POR (Portugal)	VAL (Valencian Community)	RIO (Rio de Janeiro (state))	PAC (Tochigi Prefecture)	AUS (Australia)	Pts
1	(Italy) Roberto Locatelli	Aprilia	**4**	1	Ret	**3**	4	**1**	**Ret**	6	4	2	**1**	2	**1**	**Ret**	**1**	**Ret**	230
2	(Japan) Youichi Ui	Derbi	Ret	2	**1**	21	**1**	Ret	Ret	**1**	**1**	**1**	2	**Ret**	3	3	Ret	2	217
3	(Spain) Emilio Alzamora	Honda	3	4	5	1	3	7	Ret	Ret	2	Ret	3	1	5	8	2	4	203
4	(Japan) Masao Azuma	Honda	9	8	3	4	Ret	3	2	9	5	Ret	Ret	Ret	2	2	4	1	176
5	(Japan) Noboru Ueda	Honda	5	**5**	2	5	Ret	6	Ret	2	3	13	5	Ret	11	6	7	3	153
6	(Italy) Simone Sanna	Aprilia	12	14	Ret	Ret	10	Ret	1	5	Ret	3	Ret	5	6	1	3	10	132
7	(France) Arnaud Vincent	Aprilia	1	Ret	8	8	5	8	4	13	13	4	6	3	10	Ret	8	Ret	132
8	(Italy) Mirko Giansanti	Honda	2	3	Ret	2	2	2	WD		6	5	7	Ret	13	Ret	DNS		129
9	(Italy) Gino Borsoi	Aprilia	10	6	4	12	9	5	3	11	Ret	Ret	8	8	9	7	14	9	113
10	(Italy) Ivan Goi	Honda	8	10	6	7	6	13	11	8	Ret	6	10	6	Ret	12	5	8	108
11	(Italy) Lucio Cecchinello	Honda	11	18	Ret	6	7	Ret	Ret	4	7	Ret	4	4	8	5	DSQ	Ret	91
12	(Germany) Steve Jenkner	Honda	6	9	13	10	Ret	4	Ret	7	18	10	Ret	11	16	13	13	7	74
13	(Spain) Pablo Nieto	Derbi	15	11	11	Ret	Ret	11	6	19	15	7	16	12	4	10	9	14	68
14	(Italy) Gianluigi Scalvini	Aprilia	7	7	Ret	Ret	11	10	Ret	Ret	11	8	Ret	Ret	7	4	17	Ret	64
15	(Spain) Ángel Nieto Jr.	Honda	13	12	Ret	11	16	16	9	10	9	9	Ret	9	17	DNS	10	11	57
16	(San Marino) Manuel Poggiali	Derbi	DNS		DNQ	9	8	Ret	Ret	3	Ret	Ret	12	Ret	14	Ret	11	5	53
17	(France) Randy de Puniet	Aprilia	14	Ret	10	13	12	9	13	Ret	10	Ret	Ret	7	18	9	Ret	13	50
18	(San Marino) Alex de Angelis	Honda	16	16	Ret	15	15	12	Ret	14	12	Ret	Ret	Ret	12	11	6	6	41
19	(Czech Republic) Jaroslav Huleš	Italjet	Ret	Ret	Ret	14	Ret	14	DNS	Ret	8	Ret	9	10	21	Ret			26
19	(Czech Republic) Jaroslav Huleš	Aprilia																15	26
20	(Spain) Toni Elías	Honda	23	17	17	16	17	15	8	Ret	14	Ret	14	17	15	14	12	12	24
21	(Germany) Reinhard Stolz	Honda	17	15	16	19	13	19	5	12	WD	15	15	Ret	23	18	21	16	21
22	(Italy) Max Sabbatani	Honda	20	13	19	Ret	Ret	20	7	15	16	Ret	Ret	13	26	17	18	Ret	16
23	(Italy) Marco Petrini	Aprilia	21	Ret	12	20	18	21	Ret	16	17	12	13	Ret	20	16	19		11
24	(Andorra) Éric Bataille	Honda							12	Ret	21	11		16	Ret	15	Ret	19	10
25	(Japan) Hideyuki Nakajō	Honda			7														9
26	(Japan) Yuzo Fujioka	Honda			9														8
26	(Japan) Yuzo Fujioka	NER Honda															15		8
27	(United Kingdom) Leon Haslam	Italjet	22	19	Ret	17	DNQ	22	10	18	19	Ret	17	Ret	22	Ret	Ret	17	6
28	(Czech Republic) Jakub Smrž	Honda										18	11						5
29	(Japan) Hiroyuki Kikuchi	Honda			14														2
30	(Italy) Alessandro Brannetti	Honda				Ret	14	17											2
31	(Spain) Iván Martínez	Aprilia				Ret			14										2
32	(Germany) Jarno Müller	Honda										14							2
33	(Spain) Adrián Araujo	Aprilia	18	Ret	20			23	Ret	Ret	DNS		DNS	14	Ret				2
34	(Japan) Katsuji Uezu	Yamaha			15														1
35	(San Marino) William de Angelis	Aprilia	19	Ret	18	18	Ret	18	Ret	Ret	22	Ret	Ret	15	25	DNS	DNS	Ret	1
	(Japan) Tomoyoshi Koyama	Honda															16		0
	(Germany) Achim Kariger	Honda										16							0
	(Germany) Andreas Hahn	Honda										17							0
	(Netherlands) Patrick Lakerveld	Honda								17									0
	(Australia) Josh Brookes	Honda																18	0
	(Portugal) José Leite	Honda												18					0
	(Czech Republic) Igor Kaláb	Honda											18						0
	(Hungary) László Báncsiki	Honda											19						0
	(France) Jimmy Petit	Honda					19												0
	(Spain) Héctor Faubel	Aprilia				22									19				0
	(Italy) Stefano Bianco	Honda																20	0
	(Japan) Masafumi Ono	Honda															20		0
	(Hungary) Gábor Talmácsi	Honda											20						0
	(United Kingdom) Stuart Easton	Honda									20								0
	(Netherlands) Willem van Leeuwen	Honda								20									0
	(France) Erwan Nigon	Yamaha					20												0
	(Thailand) Decha Kraisart	Yamaha		20															0
	(Netherlands) Harold de Haan	Honda								21									0
	(France) Grégory Lefort	Aprilia					21												0
	(Netherlands) Ronnie Timmer	Honda								22									0
	(France) Hugo Marchand	Honda					22												0
	(Switzerland) Marco Tresoldi	Honda						Ret											0
	(Switzerland) Marco Tresoldi	Italjet															22	Ret	0
	(United Kingdom) Paul Robinson	Honda									23								0
	(Spain) David Micó	Aprilia				23									24				0
	(Italy) Alex Baldolini	Honda						24											0
	(Australia) Jay Taylor	Honda																Ret	0
	(Australia) Michael Teniswood	Honda																Ret	0
	(Japan) Naoki Katoh	Honda															Ret		0
	(Japan) Nobuyuki Yunoki	Honda															Ret		0
	(Spain) Ángel Rodríguez	Aprilia							WD						Ret				0
	(Czech Republic) Michal Březina	Honda											Ret						0
	(Germany) Jascha Büch	Yamaha										Ret							0
	(United Kingdom) Kenny Tibble	Honda									Ret								0
	(Spain) Joaquín Perera	Honda							Ret										0
	(Japan) Shinichi Sugaya	Honda			Ret														0
	(Thailand) Suhathai Chaemsap	Honda		Ret															0
	(Brazil) Gian Calabrezzi	Honda														DNQ			
	(Brazil) Leandro Panadés	Honda														DNQ			
	(Brazil) Renato Velludo	Honda														DNQ			
	(Brazil) Wesley Gutierrez	Honda														DNQ			
	(Portugal) Emmanuel Carvalho	Honda												DNQ					
	(Portugal) Manuel Vieira	Yamaha												DNQ					
	(Portugal) Paulo Henriques	Aprilia												DNQ					
	(France) Lionel Lecomte	Honda					DNQ												
Pos	Rider	Team	RSA (South Africa)	MAL (Malaysia)	JPN (Japan)	ESP (Spain)	FRA (France)	ITA (Italy)	CAT (Catalonia)	NED (Netherlands)	GBR (United Kingdom)	GER (Germany)	CZE (Czech Republic)	POR (Portugal)	VAL (Valencian Community)	RIO (Rio de Janeiro (state))	PAC (Tochigi Prefecture)	AUS (Australia)	Pts

Colour	Result
Gold	Winner
Silver	Second place
Bronze	Third place
Green	Points classification
Blue	Non-points classification
Blue	Non-classified finish (NC)
Purple	Retired, not classified (Ret)
Red	Did not qualify (DNQ)
Red	Did not pre-qualify (DNPQ)
Black	Disqualified (DSQ)
White	Did not start (DNS)
White	Withdrew (WD)
White	Race cancelled (C)
Blank	Did not practice (DNP)
Blank	Did not arrive (DNA)
Blank	Excluded (EX)

**Bold** – Pole
Italics – Fastest Lap

=== 125cc manufacturers' standings ===
Pos	Manufacturer	RSA (South Africa)	MAL (Malaysia)	JPN (Japan)	ESP (Spain)	FRA (France)	ITA (Italy)	CAT (Catalonia)	NED (Netherlands)	GBR (United Kingdom)	GER (Germany)	CZE (Czech Republic)	POR (Portugal)	VAL (Valencian Community)	RIO (Rio de Janeiro (state))	PAC (Tochigi Prefecture)	AUS (Australia)	Pts
1	(Japan) Honda	2	3	2	1	2	2	2	2	2	5	3	1	2	2	2	1	318
2	(Italy) Aprilia	1	1	4	3	4	1	1	5	4	2	1	2	1	1	1	9	313
3	(Spain) Derbi	15	2	1	9	1	11	6	1	1	1	2	12	3	3	9	2	251
4	(Italy) Italjet	22	19	Ret	14	Ret	14	10	18	8	Ret	9	10	21	Ret	22	17	31
5	(Japan) Yamaha			15														1
6	(Japan) NER Honda															15		1
Pos	Manufacturer	RSA (South Africa)	MAL (Malaysia)	JPN (Japan)	ESP (Spain)	FRA (France)	ITA (Italy)	CAT (Catalonia)	NED (Netherlands)	GBR (United Kingdom)	GER (Germany)	CZE (Czech Republic)	POR (Portugal)	VAL (Valencian Community)	RIO (Rio de Janeiro (state))	PAC (Tochigi Prefecture)	AUS (Australia)	Pts

== Bibliography ==
- Büla, Maurice & Schertenleib, Jean-Claude (2001). Continental Circus 1949-2000. Chronosports S.A. ISBN 2-940125-32-5
- Michael Scott. Motocourse 2000-2001: The World's Leading Grand Prix and Superbike Annual. Hazelton Publishing. ISBN 978-1903135044.
