= Pacific motorcycle Grand Prix =

Coordinates: 36°32′00″N 140°13′37″E

Pacific Grand Prix

Grand Prix motorcycle racing
- Venue: Twin Ring Motegi (2000–2003)
- First race: 2000
- Last race: 2003
- Most wins (rider): Toni Elías (2)
- Most wins (manufacturer): Aprilia, Honda (5)

The Pacific motorcycle Grand Prix (パシフィックグランプリ) was a round of the FIM Grand Prix motorcycle racing championship between 2000 and 2003.

== Official names and sponsors ==
- 2000–2001: Pacific Grand Prix of Motegi (no official sponsor)
- 2002–2003: Gauloises Pacific Grand Prix of Motegi

== Winners ==
=== Multiple winners (riders) ===
# Wins	Rider	Wins	
# Wins	Rider	Category	Years won
2	(Spain) Toni Elías	250cc	2002, 2003

=== Multiple winners (manufacturers) ===
# Wins	Manufacturer	Wins	
# Wins	Manufacturer	Category	Years won
5	(Italy) Aprilia	250cc	2001, 2002, 2003
5	(Italy) Aprilia	125cc	2000, 2003
5	(Japan) Honda	MotoGP	2002, 2003
5	(Japan) Honda	500cc	2001
5	(Japan) Honda	250cc	2000
5	(Japan) Honda	125cc	2002

=== By year ===
Year	Track	125cc		250cc		MotoGP		Report
Year	Track	Rider	Manufacturer	Rider	Manufacturer	Rider	Manufacturer	Report
2003	Motegi	(Spain) Héctor Barberá	Aprilia	(Spain) Toni Elías	Aprilia	(Italy) Max Biaggi	Honda	Report
2002	Motegi	(Spain) Daniel Pedrosa	Honda	(Spain) Toni Elías	Aprilia	(Brazil) Alex Barros	Honda	Report
Year	Track	125cc		250cc		500cc		Report
Year	Track	Rider	Manufacturer	Rider	Manufacturer	Rider	Manufacturer	Report
2001	Motegi	(Japan) Youichi Ui	Derbi	(Japan) Tetsuya Harada	Aprilia	(Italy) Valentino Rossi	Honda	Report
2000	Motegi	(Italy) Roberto Locatelli	Aprilia	(Japan) Daijiro Kato	Honda	(United States) Kenny Roberts Jr.	Suzuki	Report
