= 2000 French motorcycle Grand Prix =

(France) 2000 French Grand Prix
Race details
- Race 5 of 16 races in the 2000 Grand Prix motorcycle racing season
- Date: 14 May 2000
- Official name: Grand Prix Polini de France
- Location: Bugatti Circuit
- Course: Permanent racing facility; 4.305 km (2.675 mi)

500cc
Pole position
- Rider: (Italy) Max Biaggi
- Time: 1:39.342
Fastest lap
- Rider: (Italy) Valentino Rossi
- Time: 1:40.089 on lap 5
Podium
- First: (Spain) Àlex Crivillé
- Second: (Japan) Norick Abe
- Third: (Italy) Valentino Rossi

250cc
Pole position
- Rider: (Japan) Daijiro Kato
- Time: 1:41.635
Fastest lap
- Rider: (Japan) Tohru Ukawa
- Time: 1:42.312 on lap 11
Podium
- First: (Japan) Tohru Ukawa
- Second: (Japan) Shinya Nakano
- Third: (France) Olivier Jacque

125cc
Pole position
- Rider: (Japan) Youichi Ui
- Time: 1:49.776
Fastest lap
- Rider: (Japan) Noboru Ueda
- Time: 1:48.011 on lap 3
Podium
- First: (Japan) Youichi Ui
- Second: (Italy) Mirko Giansanti
- Third: (Spain) Emilio Alzamora

The 2000 French motorcycle Grand Prix was the fifth round of the 2000 Grand Prix motorcycle racing season. It took place on 14 May 2000 at the Bugatti Circuit in Le Mans.

This would prove to be 1999 500cc champion Àlex Crivillé's final grand prix victory.

== 500 cc classification ==
Pos.	No.	Rider	Team	Manufacturer	Laps	Time/Retired	Grid	Points
1	1	(Spain) Àlex Crivillé	Repsol YPF Honda Team	Honda	28	47:15.363	5	25
2	6	(Japan) Norick Abe	Antena 3 Yamaha d'Antin	Yamaha	28	+0.321	7	20
3	46	(Italy) Valentino Rossi	Nastro Azzurro Honda	Honda	28	+1.155	10	16
4	24	(Australia) Garry McCoy	Red Bull Yamaha WCM	Yamaha	28	+4.377	8	13
5	10	(Brazil) Alex Barros	Emerson Honda Pons	Honda	28	+5.240	3	11
6	2	(United States) Kenny Roberts Jr.	Telefónica Movistar Suzuki	Suzuki	28	+9.176	4	10
7	7	(Spain) Carlos Checa	Marlboro Yamaha Team	Yamaha	28	+11.600	2	9
8	65	(Italy) Loris Capirossi	Emerson Honda Pons	Honda	28	+12.174	9	8
9	55	(France) Régis Laconi	Red Bull Yamaha WCM	Yamaha	28	+12.342	12	7
10	31	(Japan) Tetsuya Harada	Blu Aprilia Team	Aprilia	28	+29.818	15	6
11	9	(Japan) Nobuatsu Aoki	Telefónica Movistar Suzuki	Suzuki	28	+38.477	14	5
12	99	(United Kingdom) Jeremy McWilliams	Blu Aprilia Team	Aprilia	28	+42.085	6	4
13	17	(Netherlands) Jurgen van den Goorbergh	Rizla Honda	TSR-Honda	28	+44.936	13	3
14	8	(Japan) Tadayuki Okada	Repsol YPF Honda Team	Honda	28	+45.857	11	2
15	5	(Spain) Sete Gibernau	Repsol YPF Honda Team	Honda	28	+50.834	16	1
16	11	(Spain) José David de Gea	Proton Team KR	Modenas KR3	28	+1:18.818	17	
17	18	(Belgium) Sébastien Le Grelle	Tecmas Honda Elf	Honda	27	+1 Lap	19	
Ret	15	(Japan) Yoshiteru Konishi	FCC TSR	TSR-Honda	9	Accident	18	
Ret	4	(Italy) Max Biaggi	Marlboro Yamaha Team	Yamaha	3	Accident	1	
DNS	21	(United Kingdom) Ron Haslam	Sabre Sport	Honda		Did not start		

== 250 cc classification ==
Pos.	No.	Rider	Manufacturer	Laps	Time/Retired	Grid	Points
1	4	(Japan) Tohru Ukawa	Honda	26	44:42.954	5	25
2	56	(Japan) Shinya Nakano	Yamaha	26	+0.279	3	20
3	19	(France) Olivier Jacque	Yamaha	26	+2.521	6	16
4	13	(Italy) Marco Melandri	Aprilia	26	+20.531	4	13
5	14	(Australia) Anthony West	Honda	26	+25.474	8	11
6	74	(Japan) Daijiro Kato	Honda	26	+36.681	1	10
7	8	(Japan) Naoki Matsudo	Yamaha	26	+42.599	11	9
8	6	(Germany) Ralf Waldmann	Aprilia	26	+46.083	2	8
9	37	(Italy) Luca Boscoscuro	Aprilia	26	+48.751	10	7
10	9	(Argentina) Sebastián Porto	Yamaha	26	+49.128	19	6
11	21	(Italy) Franco Battaini	Aprilia	26	+55.586	7	5
12	16	(Sweden) Johan Stigefelt	TSR-Honda	26	+1:03.973	14	4
13	18	(Malaysia) Shahrol Yuzy	Yamaha	26	+1:07.028	12	3
14	26	(Germany) Klaus Nöhles	Aprilia	26	+1:09.460	15	2
15	30	(Spain) Alex Debón	Aprilia	26	+1:10.649	9	1
16	10	(Spain) Fonsi Nieto	Yamaha	26	+1:11.700	25	
17	41	(Netherlands) Jarno Janssen	TSR-Honda	26	+1:23.677	21	
18	66	(Germany) Alex Hofmann	Aprilia	26	+1:25.025	17	
19	11	(Italy) Ivan Clementi	Aprilia	26	+1:41.997	26	
20	31	(Spain) Lucas Oliver	Yamaha	25	+1 lap	23	
21	22	(France) Sébastien Gimbert	TSR-Honda	25	+1 lap	29	
22	52	(France) Julien da Costa	Honda	25	+1 lap	30	
23	58	(France) Bruno Vecchioni	Yamaha	25	+1 lap	33	
24	53	(France) Éric Dubray	Yamaha	25	+1 lap	32	
Ret	77	(United Kingdom) Jamie Robinson	Aprilia	21	Retirement	18	
Ret	25	(France) Vincent Philippe	TSR-Honda	19	Accident	16	
Ret	15	(United Kingdom) Adrian Coates	Aprilia	12	Retirement	24	
Ret	23	(France) Julien Allemand	Yamaha	11	Accident	13	
Ret	54	(Spain) David García	Aprilia	10	Retirement	27	
Ret	24	(United Kingdom) Jason Vincent	Aprilia	9	Accident	20	
Ret	42	(Spain) David Checa	TSR-Honda	9	Retirement	22	
Ret	57	(France) Hervé Mora	Honda	4	Accident	31	
Ret	55	(France) Sylvain Guintoli	Honda	1	Accident	28	

== 125 cc classification ==
Pos.	No.	Rider	Manufacturer	Laps	Time/Retired	Grid	Points
1	41	(Japan) Youichi Ui	Derbi	24	43:43.690	1	25
2	32	(Italy) Mirko Giansanti	Honda	24	+1.655	13	20
3	1	(Spain) Emilio Alzamora	Honda	24	+1.857	7	16
4	4	(Italy) Roberto Locatelli	Aprilia	24	+2.079	2	13
5	21	(France) Arnaud Vincent	Aprilia	24	+2.231	6	11
6	26	(Italy) Ivan Goi	Honda	24	+5.899	12	10
7	9	(Italy) Lucio Cecchinello	Honda	24	+10.132	5	9
8	54	(San Marino) Manuel Poggiali	Derbi	24	+13.923	9	8
9	23	(Italy) Gino Borsoi	Aprilia	24	+14.267	10	7
10	16	(Italy) Simone Sanna	Aprilia	24	+20.522	16	6
11	8	(Italy) Gianluigi Scalvini	Aprilia	24	+23.135	4	5
12	12	(France) Randy de Puniet	Aprilia	24	+33.577	19	4
13	35	(Germany) Reinhard Stolz	Honda	24	+40.851	17	3
14	19	(Italy) Alessandro Brannetti	Honda	24	+41.862	15	2
15	15	(San Marino) Alex de Angelis	Honda	24	+41.883	22	1
16	29	(Spain) Ángel Nieto Jr.	Honda	24	+42.843	26	
17	18	(Spain) Antonio Elías	Honda	24	+1:01.198	18	
18	51	(Italy) Marco Petrini	Aprilia	24	+1:21.871	21	
19	63	(France) Jimmy Petit	Honda	24	+1:25.409	24	
20	62	(France) Erwan Nigon	Yamaha	23	+1 lap	29	
21	61	(France) Grégory Lefort	Aprilia	23	+1 lap	27	
22	64	(France) Hugo Marchand	Honda	23	+1 lap	28	
Ret	11	(Italy) Max Sabbatani	Honda	20	Retirement	8	
Ret	39	(Czech Republic) Jaroslav Huleš	Italjet	19	Retirement	23	
Ret	3	(Japan) Masao Azuma	Honda	9	Accident	11	
Ret	22	(Spain) Pablo Nieto	Derbi	7	Retirement	25	
Ret	5	(Japan) Noboru Ueda	Honda	4	Accident	3	
Ret	53	(San Marino) William de Angelis	Aprilia	2	Accident	20	
Ret	17	(Germany) Steve Jenkner	Honda	1	Accident	14	
DNQ	60	(France) Lionel Lecomte	Honda		Did not qualify		
DNQ	24	(United Kingdom) Leon Haslam	Italjet		Did not qualify		

== Championship standings after the race (500cc) ==
Below are the standings for the top five riders and constructors after round five has concluded.

Riders' Championship standings

Pos.	Rider	Points
1	(United States) Kenny Roberts Jr.	90
2	(Spain) Carlos Checa	80
3	(Australia) Garry McCoy	61
4	(Spain) Àlex Crivillé	59
5	(Japan) Norifumi Abe	54

Constructors' Championship standings

Pos.	Constructor	Points
1	(Japan) Yamaha	110
2	(Japan) Suzuki	90
3	(Japan) Honda	83
4	(Italy) Aprilia	25
5	(Japan) TSR-Honda	24

- Note: Only the top five positions are included for both sets of standings.

Previous race: 2000 Spanish Grand Prix	FIM Grand Prix World Championship; 2000 season	Next race: 2000 Italian Grand Prix
Previous race: 1999 French Grand Prix	French Grand Prix	Next race: 2001 French Grand Prix
