= 2000 Czech Republic motorcycle Grand Prix =

Motorcycle race meeting

2000 Czech Republic Grand Prix
Race details
- Race 11 of 16 races in the 2000 Grand Prix motorcycle racing season
- Date: 20 August 2000
- Official name: Gauloises Grand Prix České Republiky
- Location: Brno Circuit
- Course: Permanent racing facility; 5.403 km (3.357 mi)

500cc
Pole position
- Rider: (Italy) Max Biaggi
- Time: 2:01.291
Fastest lap
- Rider: (Italy) Max Biaggi
- Time: 2:02.854 on lap 3
Podium
- First: (Italy) Max Biaggi
- Second: (Italy) Valentino Rossi
- Third: (Australia) Garry McCoy

250cc
Pole position
- Rider: (France) Olivier Jacque
- Time: 2:03.673
Fastest lap
- Rider: (Japan) Shinya Nakano
- Time: 2:04.113 on lap 14
Podium
- First: (Japan) Shinya Nakano
- Second: (Japan) Tohru Ukawa
- Third: (France) Olivier Jacque

125cc
Pole position
- Rider: (Italy) Roberto Locatelli
- Time: 2:10.003
Fastest lap
- Rider: (Japan) Youichi Ui
- Time: 2:09.416 on lap 7
Podium
- First: (Italy) Roberto Locatelli
- Second: (Japan) Youichi Ui
- Third: (Spain) Emilio Alzamora

The 2000 Czech Republic motorcycle Grand Prix was the eleventh round of the 2000 Grand Prix motorcycle racing season. It took place on 20 August 2000 at the Masaryk Circuit located in Brno, Czech Republic.

== 500 cc classification ==
| Pos. | No. | Rider | Team | Manufacturer | Laps | Time/Retired | Grid | Points |
|---|---|---|---|---|---|---|---|---|
| 1 | 4 | (Italy) Max Biaggi | Marlboro Yamaha Team | Yamaha | 22 | 45:31.918 | 1 | 25 |
| 2 | 46 | (Italy) Valentino Rossi | Nastro Azzurro Honda | Honda | 22 | +6.641 | 5 | 20 |
| 3 | 24 | (Australia) Garry McCoy | Red Bull Yamaha WCM | Yamaha | 22 | +8.627 | 4 | 16 |
| 4 | 2 | (United States) Kenny Roberts Jr. | Telefónica Movistar Suzuki | Suzuki | 22 | +12.106 | 3 | 13 |
| 5 | 65 | (Italy) Loris Capirossi | Emerson Honda Pons | Honda | 22 | +16.083 | 2 | 11 |
| 6 | 5 | (Spain) Sete Gibernau | Repsol YPF Honda Team | Honda | 22 | +22.388 | 12 | 10 |
| 7 | 1 | (Spain) Àlex Crivillé | Repsol YPF Honda Team | Honda | 22 | +22.640 | 6 | 9 |
| 8 | 9 | (Japan) Nobuatsu Aoki | Telefónica Movistar Suzuki | Suzuki | 22 | +22.830 | 14 | 8 |
| 9 | 99 | (United Kingdom) Jeremy McWilliams | Blu Aprilia Team | Aprilia | 22 | +23.002 | 9 | 7 |
| 10 | 8 | (Japan) Tadayuki Okada | Repsol YPF Honda Team | Honda | 22 | +24.525 | 13 | 6 |
| 11 | 7 | (Spain) Carlos Checa | Marlboro Yamaha Team | Yamaha | 22 | +29.560 | 15 | 5 |
| 12 | 17 | (Netherlands) Jurgen van den Goorbergh | Rizla Honda | TSR-Honda | 22 | +29.844 | 10 | 4 |
| 13 | 55 | (France) Régis Laconi | Red Bull Yamaha WCM | Yamaha | 22 | +30.393 | 16 | 3 |
| 14 | 31 | (Japan) Tetsuya Harada | Blu Aprilia Team | Aprilia | 22 | +35.863 | 8 | 2 |
| 15 | 27 | (Italy) Luca Cadalora | Proton Team KR | Modenas KR3 | 22 | +1:05.405 | 17 | 1 |
| 16 | 25 | (Spain) José Luis Cardoso | Maxon Dee Cee Jeans | Honda | 22 | +1:15.549 | 18 | |
| 17 | 43 | (Italy) Paolo Tessari | Team Paton | Paton | 21 | +1 lap | 19 | |
| 18 | 18 | (Belgium) Sébastien Le Grelle | Tecmas Honda Elf | Honda | 21 | +1 lap | 20 | |
| 19 | 20 | (United Kingdom) Phil Giles | Sabre Sport | Honda | 21 | +1 lap | 22 | |
| 20 | 15 | (Japan) Yoshiteru Konishi | FCC TSR | TSR-Honda | 21 | +1 lap | 21 | |
| Ret | 10 | (Brazil) Alex Barros | Emerson Honda Pons | Honda | 4 | Accident | 11 | |
| Ret | 6 | (Japan) Norick Abe | Antena 3 Yamaha d'Antin | Yamaha | 1 | Retirement | 7 | |

== 250 cc classification ==
| Pos. | No. | Rider | Manufacturer | Laps | Time/Retired | Grid | Points |
|---|---|---|---|---|---|---|---|
| 1 | 56 | (Japan) Shinya Nakano | Yamaha | 20 | 41:44.845 | 2 | 25 |
| 2 | 4 | (Japan) Tohru Ukawa | Honda | 20 | +3.994 | 4 | 20 |
| 3 | 19 | (France) Olivier Jacque | Yamaha | 20 | +4.987 | 1 | 16 |
| 4 | 35 | (Italy) Marco Melandri | Aprilia | 20 | +6.028 | 5 | 13 |
| 5 | 6 | (Germany) Ralf Waldmann | Aprilia | 20 | +13.366 | 3 | 11 |
| 6 | 74 | (Japan) Daijiro Kato | Honda | 20 | +21.259 | 8 | 10 |
| 7 | 21 | (Italy) Franco Battaini | Aprilia | 20 | +26.489 | 6 | 9 |
| 8 | 9 | (Argentina) Sebastián Porto | Yamaha | 20 | +45.073 | 11 | 8 |
| 9 | 26 | (Germany) Klaus Nöhles | Aprilia | 20 | +47.135 | 10 | 7 |
| 10 | 14 | (Australia) Anthony West | Honda | 20 | +56.932 | 16 | 6 |
| 11 | 8 | (Japan) Naoki Matsudo | Yamaha | 20 | +57.074 | 12 | 5 |
| 12 | 18 | (Malaysia) Shahrol Yuzy | Yamaha | 20 | +57.321 | 13 | 4 |
| 13 | 42 | (Spain) David Checa | TSR-Honda | 20 | +1:11.286 | 17 | 3 |
| 14 | 37 | (Italy) Luca Boscoscuro | Aprilia | 20 | +1:12.160 | 19 | 2 |
| 15 | 77 | (United Kingdom) Jamie Robinson | Aprilia | 20 | +1:15.068 | 7 | 1 |
| 16 | 25 | (France) Vincent Philippe | TSR-Honda | 20 | +1:15.496 | 18 | |
| 17 | 11 | (Italy) Ivan Clementi | Aprilia | 20 | +1:16.125 | 27 | |
| 18 | 22 | (France) Sébastien Gimbert | TSR-Honda | 20 | +1:16.282 | 24 | |
| 19 | 66 | (Germany) Alex Hofmann | Aprilia | 20 | +1:16.881 | 23 | |
| 20 | 31 | (Spain) Lucas Oliver | Yamaha | 20 | +1:27.084 | 25 | |
| 21 | 23 | (France) Julien Allemand | Yamaha | 20 | +1:32.893 | 26 | |
| 22 | 15 | (United Kingdom) Adrian Coates | Aprilia | 20 | +1:35.776 | 28 | |
| 23 | 82 | (Slovakia) Vladimír Častka | Yamaha | 20 | +1:42.645 | 21 | |
| 24 | 84 | (Austria) Michael Witzeneder | Honda | 19 | +1 lap | 29 | |
| 25 | 81 | (Czech Republic) Radomil Rous | Honda | 19 | +1 lap | 31 | |
| Ret | 24 | (United Kingdom) Jason Vincent | Aprilia | 16 | Accident | 9 | |
| Ret | 20 | (Spain) Jerónimo Vidal | Aprilia | 9 | Retirement | 20 | |
| Ret | 10 | (Spain) Fonsi Nieto | Yamaha | 7 | Retirement | 15 | |
| Ret | 30 | (Spain) Alex Debón | Aprilia | 2 | Accident | 14 | |
| Ret | 41 | (Netherlands) Jarno Janssen | TSR-Honda | 2 | Accident | 22 | |
| Ret | 83 | (Austria) Uwe Bolterauer | Honda | 2 | Accident | 30 | |
| DNS | 16 | (Sweden) Johan Stigefelt | TSR-Honda | | Did not start | | |

== 125 cc classification ==
| Pos. | No. | Rider | Manufacturer | Laps | Time/Retired | Grid | Points |
|---|---|---|---|---|---|---|---|
| 1 | 4 | (Italy) Roberto Locatelli | Aprilia | 19 | 41:19.190 | 1 | 25 |
| 2 | 41 | (Japan) Youichi Ui | Derbi | 19 | +1.533 | 2 | 20 |
| 3 | 1 | (Spain) Emilio Alzamora | Honda | 19 | +1.716 | 4 | 16 |
| 4 | 9 | (Italy) Lucio Cecchinello | Honda | 19 | +18.466 | 9 | 13 |
| 5 | 5 | (Japan) Noboru Ueda | Honda | 19 | +29.076 | 3 | 11 |
| 6 | 21 | (France) Arnaud Vincent | Aprilia | 19 | +33.896 | 20 | 10 |
| 7 | 32 | (Italy) Mirko Giansanti | Honda | 19 | +34.910 | 11 | 9 |
| 8 | 23 | (Italy) Gino Borsoi | Aprilia | 19 | +35.161 | 12 | 8 |
| 9 | 39 | (Czech Republic) Jaroslav Huleš | Italjet | 19 | +43.932 | 18 | 7 |
| 10 | 26 | (Italy) Ivan Goi | Honda | 19 | +51.767 | 13 | 6 |
| 11 | 78 | (Czech Republic) Jakub Smrž | Honda | 19 | +55.001 | 17 | 5 |
| 12 | 54 | (San Marino) Manuel Poggiali | Derbi | 19 | +58.524 | 24 | 4 |
| 13 | 51 | (Italy) Marco Petrini | Aprilia | 19 | +1:02.714 | 19 | 3 |
| 14 | 18 | (Spain) Antonio Elías | Honda | 19 | +1:03.009 | 22 | 2 |
| 15 | 35 | (Germany) Reinhard Stolz | Honda | 19 | +1:08.530 | 21 | 1 |
| 16 | 22 | (Spain) Pablo Nieto | Derbi | 19 | +1:09.919 | 15 | |
| 17 | 24 | (United Kingdom) Leon Haslam | Italjet | 19 | +1:35.984 | 26 | |
| 18 | 79 | (Czech Republic) Igor Kaláb | Honda | 19 | +1:36.325 | 27 | |
| 19 | 81 | (Hungary) László Báncsiki | Honda | 18 | +1 lap | 28 | |
| 20 | 82 | (Hungary) Gábor Talmácsi | Honda | 18 | +1 lap | 30 | |
| Ret | 17 | (Germany) Steve Jenkner | Honda | 16 | Accident | 5 | |
| Ret | 16 | (Italy) Simone Sanna | Aprilia | 12 | Retirement | 7 | |
| Ret | 11 | (Italy) Max Sabbatani | Honda | 8 | Retirement | 23 | |
| Ret | 80 | (Czech Republic) Michal Březina | Honda | 7 | Retirement | 29 | |
| Ret | 15 | (San Marino) Alex de Angelis | Honda | 6 | Accident | 14 | |
| Ret | 29 | (Spain) Ángel Nieto Jr. | Honda | 6 | Accident | 6 | |
| Ret | 53 | (San Marino) William de Angelis | Aprilia | 4 | Accident | 25 | |
| Ret | 8 | (Italy) Gianluigi Scalvini | Aprilia | 4 | Retirement | 8 | |
| Ret | 3 | (Japan) Masao Azuma | Honda | 3 | Retirement | 10 | |
| Ret | 12 | (France) Randy de Puniet | Aprilia | 0 | Accident | 16 | |
| DNS | 10 | (Spain) Adrián Araujo | Honda | | Did not start | | |

== Championship standings after the race (500cc) ==
Below are the standings for the top five riders and constructors after round eleven has concluded.

Riders' Championship standings

| Pos. | Rider | Points |
|---|---|---|
| 1 | (United States) Kenny Roberts Jr. | 174 |
| 2 | (Italy) Valentino Rossi | 132 |
| 3 | (Spain) Carlos Checa | 128 |
| 4 | (Italy) Loris Capirossi | 123 |
| 5 | (Japan) Norifumi Abe | 106 |

Constructors' Championship standings

| Pos. | Constructor | Points |
|---|---|---|
| 1 | (Japan) Honda | 219 |
| 2 | (Japan) Yamaha | 211 |
| 3 | (Japan) Suzuki | 180 |
| 4 | (Italy) Aprilia | 75 |
| 5 | (Japan) TSR-Honda | 60 |

- Note: Only the top five positions are included for both sets of standings.

| Previous race: 2000 German Grand Prix | FIM Grand Prix World Championship; 2000 season | Next race: 2000 Portuguese Grand Prix |
| Previous race: 1999 Czech Republic Grand Prix | Czech Republic Grand Prix | Next race: 2001 Czech Republic Grand Prix |
