= 2000 Spanish motorcycle Grand Prix =

International motorcycle race

2000 Spain Grand Prix
Race details
- Race 4 of 16 races in the 2000 Grand Prix motorcycle racing season
- Date: 30 April 2000
- Official name: Gran Premio Marlboro de España
- Location: Circuito de Jerez
- Course: Permanent racing facility; 4.423 km (2.748 mi)

500cc
Pole position
- Rider: (Italy) Max Biaggi
- Time: 1:42.941
Fastest lap
- Rider: (United States) Kenny Roberts Jr.
- Time: 1:44.127 on lap 2
Podium
- First: (United States) Kenny Roberts Jr.
- Second: (Spain) Carlos Checa
- Third: (Italy) Valentino Rossi

250cc
Pole position
- Rider: (Germany) Ralf Waldmann
- Time: 1:44.025
Fastest lap
- Rider: (Germany) Ralf Waldmann
- Time: 1:44.991 on lap 3
Podium
- First: (Germany) Ralf Waldmann
- Second: (Japan) Daijiro Kato
- Third: (Japan) Tohru Ukawa

125cc
Pole position
- Rider: (Italy) Roberto Locatelli
- Time: 1:48.260
Fastest lap
- Rider: (Italy) Roberto Locatelli
- Time: 1:49.372 on lap 11
Podium
- First: (Spain) Emilio Alzamora
- Second: (Italy) Mirko Giansanti
- Third: (Italy) Roberto Locatelli

The 2000 Spanish motorcycle Grand Prix was the fourth round of the 2000 Grand Prix motorcycle racing season. It took place on 30 April 2000 at the Circuito Permanente de Jerez.

== 500 cc classification ==
Pos.	No.	Rider	Team	Manufacturer	Laps	Time/Retired	Grid	Points
1	2	(United States) Kenny Roberts Jr.	Telefónica Movistar Suzuki	Suzuki	26	45:52.311	4	25
2	7	(Spain) Carlos Checa	Marlboro Yamaha Team	Yamaha	26	+0.859	3	20
3	46	(Italy) Valentino Rossi	Nastro Azzurro Honda	Honda	26	+3.525	2	16
4	1	(Spain) Àlex Crivillé	Repsol YPF Honda Team	Honda	26	+5.037	5	13
5	10	(Brazil) Alex Barros	Emerson Honda Pons	Honda	26	+12.608	8	11
6	65	(Italy) Loris Capirossi	Emerson Honda Pons	Honda	26	+17.436	6	10
7	9	(Japan) Nobuatsu Aoki	Telefónica Movistar Suzuki	Suzuki	26	+19.484	17	9
8	55	(France) Régis Laconi	Red Bull Yamaha WCM	Yamaha	26	+27.589	10	8
9	17	(Netherlands) Jurgen van den Goorbergh	Rizla Honda	TSR-Honda	26	+27.777	13	7
10	8	(Japan) Tadayuki Okada	Repsol YPF Honda Team	Honda	26	+35.920	7	6
11	31	(Japan) Tetsuya Harada	Aprilia Grand Prix Racing	Aprilia	26	+47.107	11	5
12	11	(Spain) José David de Gea	Proton Team KR	Modenas KR3	26	+1:56.859	18	4
13	15	(Japan) Yoshiteru Konishi	Technical Sports Racing	TSR-Honda	26	+2:09.097	20	3
Ret	24	(Australia) Garry McCoy	Red Bull Yamaha WCM	Yamaha	17	Accident	12	
Ret	12	(South Africa) Shane Norval	Sabre Sport	Honda	17	Accident	21	
Ret	6	(Japan) Norick Abe	Antena 3 Yamaha d'Antin	Yamaha	16	Retirement	14	
Ret	5	(Spain) Sete Gibernau	Repsol YPF Honda Team	Honda	16	Accident	16	
Ret	99	(United Kingdom) Jeremy McWilliams	Aprilia Grand Prix Racing	Aprilia	15	Accident	9	
Ret	22	(France) Sébastien Gimbert	Tecmas Honda Elf	Honda	11	Retirement	19	
Ret	25	(Spain) José Luis Cardoso	Maxon Dee Cee Jeans	Honda	4	Retirement	15	
Ret	4	(Italy) Max Biaggi	Marlboro Yamaha Team	Yamaha	3	Retirement	1	

== 250 cc classification ==
Pos.	No.	Rider	Manufacturer	Laps	Time/Retired	Grid	Points
1	6	(Germany) Ralf Waldmann	Aprilia	26	45:56.451	1	25
2	74	(Japan) Daijiro Kato	Honda	26	+5.188	3	20
3	4	(Japan) Tohru Ukawa	Honda	26	+6.052	4	16
4	19	(France) Olivier Jacque	Yamaha	26	+23.670	6	13
5	14	(Australia) Anthony West	Honda	26	+29.685	15	11
6	13	(Italy) Marco Melandri	Aprilia	26	+36.549	7	10
7	34	(Italy) Marcellino Lucchi	Aprilia	26	+43.644	5	9
8	26	(Germany) Klaus Nöhles	Aprilia	26	+47.266	11	8
9	9	(Argentina) Sebastián Porto	Yamaha	26	+50.638	12	7
10	21	(Italy) Franco Battaini	Aprilia	26	+50.706	9	6
11	37	(Italy) Luca Boscoscuro	Aprilia	26	+52.303	8	5
12	24	(United Kingdom) Jason Vincent	Aprilia	26	+56.202	20	4
13	16	(Sweden) Johan Stigefelt	TSR-Honda	26	+58.336	14	3
14	30	(Spain) Alex Debón	Aprilia	26	+1:00.523	13	2
15	56	(Japan) Shinya Nakano	Yamaha	26	+1:03.969	2	1
16	10	(Spain) Fonsi Nieto	Yamaha	26	+1:03.985	19	
17	66	(Germany) Alex Hofmann	Aprilia	26	+1:07.612	23	
18	42	(Spain) David Checa	TSR-Honda	26	+1:09.664	25	
19	44	(Italy) Roberto Rolfo	TSR-Honda	26	+1:11.963	27	
20	54	(Spain) David García	Aprilia	26	+1:16.652	18	
21	15	(United Kingdom) Adrian Coates	Aprilia	26	+1:25.101	26	
22	20	(Spain) Jerónimo Vidal	Aprilia	26	+1:26.646	21	
23	31	(Spain) Lucas Oliver	Yamaha	25	+1 lap	28	
24	23	(France) Julien Allemand	Yamaha	25	+1 lap	29	
25	40	(Spain) David Ortega	Honda	25	+1 lap	31	
Ret	25	(France) Vincent Philippe	TSR-Honda	22	Accident	30	
Ret	8	(Japan) Naoki Matsudo	Yamaha	15	Accident	10	
Ret	11	(Italy) Ivan Clementi	Aprilia	15	Accident	24	
Ret	41	(Netherlands) Jarno Janssen	TSR-Honda	14	Retirement	22	
Ret	77	(United Kingdom) Jamie Robinson	Aprilia	9	Retirement	17	
Ret	39	(Spain) Ismael Bonilla	Honda	7	Retirement	32	
Ret	18	(Malaysia) Shahrol Yuzy	Yamaha	0	Accident	16	

== 125 cc classification ==
Pos.	No.	Rider	Manufacturer	Laps	Time/Retired	Grid	Points
1	1	(Spain) Emilio Alzamora	Honda	23	42:19.740	3	25
2	32	(Italy) Mirko Giansanti	Honda	23	+1.047	8	20
3	4	(Italy) Roberto Locatelli	Aprilia	23	+5.076	1	16
4	3	(Japan) Masao Azuma	Honda	23	+9.661	11	13
5	5	(Japan) Noboru Ueda	Honda	23	+19.030	4	11
6	9	(Italy) Lucio Cecchinello	Honda	23	+19.397	5	10
7	26	(Italy) Ivan Goi	Honda	23	+24.987	12	9
8	21	(France) Arnaud Vincent	Aprilia	23	+30.981	20	8
9	54	(San Marino) Manuel Poggiali	Derbi	23	+36.238	15	7
10	17	(Germany) Steve Jenkner	Honda	23	+40.379	18	6
11	29	(Spain) Ángel Nieto Jr.	Honda	23	+40.972	16	5
12	23	(Italy) Gino Borsoi	Aprilia	23	+46.436	10	4
13	12	(France) Randy de Puniet	Aprilia	23	+46.577	13	3
14	39	(Czech Republic) Jaroslav Huleš	Italjet	23	+1:00.404	21	2
15	15	(San Marino) Alex de Angelis	Honda	23	+1:03.953	17	1
16	18	(Spain) Antonio Elías	Honda	23	+1:06.189	19	
17	24	(United Kingdom) Leon Haslam	Italjet	23	+1:16.185	23	
18	53	(San Marino) William de Angelis	Aprilia	23	+1:23.049	26	
19	35	(Germany) Reinhard Stolz	Honda	23	+1:26.218	24	
20	51	(Italy) Marco Petrini	Aprilia	23	+1:27.877	22	
21	41	(Japan) Youichi Ui	Derbi	23	+1:30.883	2	
22	44	(Spain) Héctor Faubel	Aprilia	23	+1:46.512	28	
23	43	(Spain) David Micó	Aprilia	23	+1:46.656	29	
Ret	8	(Italy) Gianluigi Scalvini	Aprilia	12	Retirement	7	
Ret	11	(Italy) Max Sabbatani	Honda	10	Retirement	14	
Ret	19	(Italy) Alessandro Brannetti	Honda	7	Accident	25	
Ret	45	(Spain) Iván Martínez	Aprilia	5	Retirement	27	
Ret	16	(Italy) Simone Sanna	Aprilia	0	Accident	6	
Ret	22	(Spain) Pablo Nieto	Derbi	0	Accident	9	

== Championship standings after the race (500cc) ==
Below are the standings for the top five riders and constructors after round four has concluded.

Riders' Championship standings

Pos.	Rider	Points
1	(United States) Kenny Roberts Jr.	80
2	(Spain) Carlos Checa	71
3	(Australia) Garry McCoy	48
4	(Brazil) Alex Barros	41
5	(Japan) Nobuatsu Aoki	41

Constructors' Championship standings

Pos.	Constructor	Points
1	(Japan) Yamaha	90
2	(Japan) Suzuki	80
3	(Japan) Honda	58
4	(Japan) TSR-Honda	21
5	(Italy) Aprilia	19

- Note: Only the top five positions are included for both sets of standings.

Previous race: 2000 Japanese Grand Prix	FIM Grand Prix World Championship; 2000 season	Next race: 2000 French Grand Prix
Previous race: 1999 Spanish Grand Prix	Spanish Grand Prix	Next race: 2001 Spanish Grand Prix
