= 2000 Malaysian motorcycle Grand Prix =

Motorcycle race

(Malaysia) 2000 Malaysian Grand Prix
Race details
- Race 2 of 16 races in the 2000 Grand Prix motorcycle racing season
- Date: 2 April 2000
- Official name: Malaysian Motorcycle Grand Prix
- Location: Sepang International Circuit
- Course: Permanent racing facility; 5.543 km (3.444 mi)

500cc
Pole position
- Rider: (United States) Kenny Roberts Jr.
- Time: 2:06.053
Fastest lap
- Rider: (United States) Kenny Roberts Jr.
- Time: 2:06.839 on lap 2
Podium
- First: (United States) Kenny Roberts Jr.
- Second: (Spain) Carlos Checa
- Third: (Australia) Garry McCoy

250cc
Pole position
- Rider: (Japan) Tohru Ukawa
- Time: 2:08.225
Fastest lap
- Rider: (Japan) Shinya Nakano
- Time: 2:09.116 on lap 3
Podium
- First: (Japan) Shinya Nakano
- Second: (France) Olivier Jacque
- Third: (Japan) Daijiro Kato

125cc
Pole position
- Rider: (Japan) Noboru Ueda
- Time: 2:15.886
Fastest lap
- Rider: (Italy) Mirko Giansanti
- Time: 2:16.138 on lap 14
Podium
- First: (Italy) Roberto Locatelli
- Second: (Japan) Youichi Ui
- Third: (Italy) Mirko Giansanti

The 2000 Malaysian motorcycle Grand Prix was the second round of the 2000 Grand Prix motorcycle racing season. It took place on 2 April 2000 at the Sepang International Circuit.

== 500cc race report ==
The race was won by Kenny Roberts Jr., after he had already qualified for pole position on Saturday.

At the start, Kenny Roberts Jr. lost ground to the Yamaha's of Carlos Checa and Norick Abe, with Loris Capirossi also making up ground to go up into third place, with Valentino Rossi right behind in 4th place. Kenny Roberts Jr. dropped down to 11th position.

After a few corners, both Àlex Crivillé and Capirossi fell and retired on the opening lap. Capirossi highsighted whilst accelerating out of the corner, taking out Crivillé in the process and almost taking out Roberts as well.

On lap 2, Roberts had moved up into 6th position, thanks to the crash from both Capirossi and Crivillé

On lap 3, Norick Abe crashed out of the race. He lowsided when coming out of corner 9 and slid into the grass.

On lap 4, Checa still led, with Rossi in second, McCoy in third, Roberts in 4th and Max Biaggi in 5th place. Rossi also crashed out of the race at turn 1, making this his second retirement of the season. He lost the front end, highsighted and slid into the grass with his Honda.

After a few laps, Roberts overtook McCoy and went up into second place, after Rossi retired. Checa still led the race, but Roberts' Suzuki was now closing in on the Yamaha of Checa with 14 laps to go.

On lap 7, Roberts overtook Checa to take a lead he would never surrender.

On lap 11, McCoy overtook Biaggi for third place after Biaggi ran wide on the first corner. He tried to gain it back, but ultimately conceded.

On lap 15, Roberts waved his hand, indicating that it was raining. The race was red-flagged, Roberts won and full points were given because two-thirds of the race distance was traversed by the riders.

== 500 cc classification ==
Pos.	No.	Rider	Team	Manufacturer	Laps	Time/Retired	Grid	Points
1	2	(United States) Kenny Roberts Jr.	Telefónica Movistar Suzuki	Suzuki	15	31:58.102	1	25
2	7	(Spain) Carlos Checa	Marlboro Yamaha Team	Yamaha	15	+1.870	4	20
3	24	(Australia) Garry McCoy	Red Bull Yamaha WCM	Yamaha	15	+7.190	6	16
4	4	(Italy) Max Biaggi	Marlboro Yamaha Team	Yamaha	15	+13.202	3	13
5	9	(Japan) Nobuatsu Aoki	Telefónica Movistar Suzuki	Suzuki	15	+22.214	11	11
6	8	(Japan) Tadayuki Okada	Repsol YPF Honda Team	Honda	15	+22.858	12	10
7	5	(Spain) Sete Gibernau	Repsol YPF Honda Team	Honda	15	+25.081	14	9
8	10	(Brazil) Alex Barros	Emerson Honda Pons	Honda	15	+25.229	9	8
9	55	(France) Régis Laconi	Red Bull Yamaha WCM	Yamaha	15	+25.522	13	7
10	99	(United Kingdom) Jeremy McWilliams	Aprilia Grand Prix Racing	Aprilia	15	+35.874	15	6
11	17	(Netherlands) Jurgen van den Goorbergh	Rizla Honda	TSR-Honda	15	+46.150	10	5
12	31	(Japan) Tetsuya Harada	Aprilia Grand Prix Racing	Aprilia	15	+46.615	16	4
13	25	(Spain) José Luis Cardoso	Maxon Dee Cee Jeans	Honda	15	+1:03.255	17	3
14	11	(Spain) José David de Gea	Proton Team KR	Modenas KR3	15	+1:05.616	18	2
15	22	(France) Sébastien Gimbert	Tecmas Honda Elf	Honda	15	+1:08.226	19	1
16	12	(South Africa) Shane Norval	Sabre Sport	Honda	15	+1:42.190	21	
17	6	(Japan) Norick Abe	Antena 3 Yamaha d'Antin	Yamaha	14	+1 lap	5	
Ret	46	(Italy) Valentino Rossi	Nastro Azzurro Honda	Honda	4	Accident	7	
Ret	15	(Japan) Yoshiteru Konishi	F.C.C. TSR	TSR-Honda	3	Accident	20	
Ret	1	(Spain) Àlex Crivillé	Repsol YPF Honda Team	Honda	0	Accident	8	
Ret	65	(Italy) Loris Capirossi	Emerson Honda Pons	Honda	0	Accident	2	

== 250 cc classification ==
Pos.	No.	Rider	Manufacturer	Laps	Time/Retired	Grid	Points
1	56	(Japan) Shinya Nakano	Yamaha	20	43:20.928	5	25
2	19	(France) Olivier Jacque	Yamaha	20	+4.042	4	20
3	74	(Japan) Daijiro Kato	Honda	20	+6.270	2	16
4	6	(Germany) Ralf Waldmann	Aprilia	20	+17.172	3	13
5	13	(Italy) Marco Melandri	Aprilia	20	+41.679	9	11
6	14	(Australia) Anthony West	Honda	20	+43.577	8	10
7	37	(Italy) Luca Boscoscuro	Aprilia	20	+46.589	6	9
8	9	(Argentina) Sebastián Porto	Yamaha	20	+50.730	16	8
9	30	(Spain) Alex Debón	Aprilia	20	+57.955	19	7
10	66	(Germany) Alex Hofmann	Aprilia	20	+58.477	12	6
11	8	(Japan) Naoki Matsudo	Yamaha	20	+58.659	11	5
12	24	(United Kingdom) Jason Vincent	Aprilia	20	+59.380	23	4
13	21	(Italy) Franco Battaini	Aprilia	20	+1:05.180	7	3
14	44	(Italy) Roberto Rolfo	TSR-Honda	20	+1:15.621	24	2
15	16	(Sweden) Johan Stigefelt	TSR-Honda	20	+1:19.994	25	1
16	41	(Netherlands) Jarno Janssen	TSR-Honda	20	+1:31.080	17	
17	25	(France) Vincent Philippe	TSR-Honda	20	+1:33.083	27	
18	18	(Malaysia) Shahrol Yuzy	Yamaha	20	+1:45.662	18	
19	12	(Germany) Mike Baldinger	Yamaha	20	+1:46.346	26	
Ret	31	(Spain) Lucas Oliver	Yamaha	13	Retirement	28	
Ret	54	(Spain) David García	Aprilia	12	Accident	14	
Ret	10	(Spain) Fonsi Nieto	Yamaha	10	Retirement	22	
Ret	77	(United Kingdom) Jamie Robinson	Aprilia	7	Retirement	15	
Ret	15	(United Kingdom) Adrian Coates	Aprilia	4	Retirement	13	
Ret	11	(Italy) Ivan Clementi	Aprilia	0	Accident	21	
Ret	26	(Germany) Klaus Nöhles	Aprilia	0	Accident	10	
Ret	4	(Japan) Tohru Ukawa	Honda	0	Accident	1	
Ret	42	(Spain) David Checa	TSR-Honda	0	Accident	20	

== 125 cc classification ==
Pos.	No.	Rider	Manufacturer	Laps	Time/Retired	Grid	Points
1	4	(Italy) Roberto Locatelli	Aprilia	19	43:30.945	3	25
2	41	(Japan) Youichi Ui	Derbi	19	+0.161	5	20
3	32	(Italy) Mirko Giansanti	Honda	19	+0.163	9	16
4	1	(Spain) Emilio Alzamora	Honda	19	+1.299	4	13
5	5	(Japan) Noboru Ueda	Honda	19	+6.246	1	11
6	23	(Italy) Gino Borsoi	Aprilia	19	+6.315	12	10
7	8	(Italy) Gianluigi Scalvini	Aprilia	19	+11.098	15	9
8	3	(Japan) Masao Azuma	Honda	19	+11.329	7	8
9	17	(Germany) Steve Jenkner	Honda	19	+11.540	14	7
10	26	(Italy) Ivan Goi	Honda	19	+15.917	11	6
11	22	(Spain) Pablo Nieto	Derbi	19	+23.496	17	5
12	29	(Spain) Ángel Nieto Jr.	Honda	19	+26.226	16	4
13	11	(Italy) Max Sabbatani	Honda	19	+30.126	6	3
14	16	(Italy) Simone Sanna	Aprilia	19	+34.564	10	2
15	35	(Germany) Reinhard Stolz	Honda	19	+56.991	20	1
16	15	(San Marino) Alex de Angelis	Honda	19	+1:02.794	19	
17	18	(Spain) Antonio Elías	Honda	19	+1:03.411	18	
18	9	(Italy) Lucio Cecchinello	Honda	19	+1:04.648	8	
19	24	(United Kingdom) Leon Haslam	Italjet	19	+1:25.423	24	
20	48	(Thailand) Decha Kraisart	Yamaha	19	+2:14.740	27	
Ret	51	(Italy) Marco Petrini	Aprilia	14	Retirement	23	
Ret	39	(Czech Republic) Jaroslav Huleš	Italjet	14	Retirement	22	
Ret	10	(Spain) Adrián Araujo	Honda	12	Retirement	25	
Ret	53	(San Marino) William de Angelis	Aprilia	11	Retirement	21	
Ret	21	(France) Arnaud Vincent	Aprilia	10	Retirement	2	
Ret	12	(France) Randy de Puniet	Aprilia	10	Accident	13	
Ret	49	(Thailand) Suhathai Chaemsap	Honda	1	Accident	26	

== Championship standings after the race (500cc) ==
Below are the standings for the top five riders and constructors after round two has concluded.

Riders' Championship standings

Pos.	Rider	Points
1	(Australia) Garry McCoy	41
2	(Spain) Carlos Checa	40
3	(United States) Kenny Roberts Jr.	35
4	(Brazil) Alex Barros	21
5	(Japan) Nobuatsu Aoki	19

Constructors' Championship standings

Pos.	Constructor	Points
1	(Japan) Yamaha	45
2	(Japan) Suzuki	35
3	(Japan) Honda	26
4	(Japan) TSR-Honda	11
5	(Italy) Aprilia	6

- Note: Only the top five positions are included for both sets of standings.

Previous race: 2000 South African Grand Prix	FIM Grand Prix World Championship; 2000 season	Next race: 2000 Japanese Grand Prix
Previous race: 1999 Malaysian Grand Prix	Malaysian Grand Prix	Next race: 2001 Malaysian Grand Prix
