= 2000 Catalan motorcycle Grand Prix =

Racing event

(Catalonia) 2000 Catalan Grand Prix
Race details
- Race 7 of 16 races in the 2000 Grand Prix motorcycle racing season
- Date: 11 June 2000
- Official name: Gran Premi Marlboro de Catalunya
- Location: Circuit de Catalunya
- Course: Permanent racing facility; 4.727 km (2.937 mi)

500cc
Pole position
- Rider: (Brazil) Alex Barros
- Time: 1:45.914
Fastest lap
- Rider: (Brazil) Alex Barros
- Time: 2:02.098 on lap 7
Podium
- First: (United States) Kenny Roberts Jr.
- Second: (Japan) Norick Abe
- Third: (Italy) Valentino Rossi

250cc
Pole position
- Rider: (Japan) Shinya Nakano
- Time: 1:48.183
Fastest lap
- Rider: (United Kingdom) Jason Vincent
- Time: 2:03.100 on lap 23
Podium
- First: (France) Olivier Jacque
- Second: (Japan) Tohru Ukawa
- Third: (Japan) Shinya Nakano

125cc
Pole position
- Rider: (Italy) Roberto Locatelli
- Time: 1:52.588
Fastest lap
- Rider: (Spain) Pablo Nieto
- Time: 2:07.820 on lap 12
Podium
- First: (Italy) Simone Sanna
- Second: (Japan) Masao Azuma
- Third: (Italy) Gino Borsoi

The 2000 Catalan motorcycle Grand Prix was the seventh round of the 2000 Grand Prix motorcycle racing season. It took place on 11 June 2000 at the Circuit de Catalunya. This was the 600th race to contribute to the Grand Prix motorcycle racing championship.

== 500 cc classification ==
Pos.	No.	Rider	Team	Manufacturer	Laps	Time/Retired	Grid	Points
1	2	(United States) Kenny Roberts Jr.	Telefónica Movistar Suzuki	Suzuki	25	51:31.504	3	25
2	6	(Japan) Norick Abe	Antena 3 Yamaha d'Antin	Yamaha	25	+4.454	12	20
3	46	(Italy) Valentino Rossi	Nastro Azzurro Honda	Honda	25	+9.541	9	16
4	9	(Japan) Nobuatsu Aoki	Telefónica Movistar Suzuki	Suzuki	25	+12.621	5	13
5	4	(Italy) Max Biaggi	Marlboro Yamaha Team	Yamaha	25	+17.224	8	11
6	65	(Italy) Loris Capirossi	Emerson Honda Pons	Honda	25	+25.906	2	10
7	17	(Netherlands) Jurgen van den Goorbergh	Rizla Honda	TSR-Honda	25	+45.688	15	9
8	11	(Spain) José David de Gea	Proton Team KR	Modenas KR3	25	+1:02.945	16	8
9	31	(Japan) Tetsuya Harada	Blu Aprilia Team	Aprilia	25	+1:21.784	14	7
10	15	(Japan) Yoshiteru Konishi	FCC TSR	TSR-Honda	25	+1:33.670	18	6
11	18	(Belgium) Sébastien Le Grelle	Tecmas Honda Elf	Honda	24	+1 lap	20	5
12	99	(United Kingdom) Jeremy McWilliams	Blu Aprilia Team	Aprilia	24	+1 lap	13	4
13	55	(France) Régis Laconi	Red Bull Yamaha WCM	Yamaha	24	+1 lap	11	3
14	12	(South Africa) Shane Norval	Sabre Sport	Honda	24	+1 lap	19	2
15	8	(Japan) Tadayuki Okada	Repsol YPF Honda Team	Honda	24	+1 lap	6	1
16	24	(Australia) Garry McCoy	Red Bull Yamaha WCM	Yamaha	23	+2 laps	17	
Ret	10	(Brazil) Alex Barros	Emerson Honda Pons	Honda	12	Retirement	1	
Ret	1	(Spain) Àlex Crivillé	Repsol YPF Honda Team	Honda	10	Accident	7	
Ret	5	(Spain) Sete Gibernau	Repsol YPF Honda Team	Honda	5	Accident	10	
Ret	7	(Spain) Carlos Checa	Marlboro Yamaha Team	Yamaha	4	Accident	4	
DNS	25	(Spain) José Luis Cardoso	Maxon Dee Cee Jeans	Honda		Did not start		

== 250 cc classification ==
Pos.	No.	Rider	Manufacturer	Laps	Time/Retired	Grid	Points
1	19	(France) Olivier Jacque	Yamaha	23	48:23.116	4	25
2	4	(Japan) Tohru Ukawa	Honda	23	+4.025	3	20
3	56	(Japan) Shinya Nakano	Yamaha	23	+8.177	1	16
4	74	(Japan) Daijiro Kato	Honda	23	+12.811	7	13
5	21	(Italy) Franco Battaini	Aprilia	23	+12.998	9	11
6	13	(Italy) Marco Melandri	Aprilia	23	+13.161	5	10
7	6	(Germany) Ralf Waldmann	Aprilia	23	+46.137	2	9
8	8	(Japan) Naoki Matsudo	Yamaha	23	+49.412	17	8
9	14	(Australia) Anthony West	Honda	23	+49.458	24	7
10	77	(United Kingdom) Jamie Robinson	Aprilia	23	+56.066	10	6
11	16	(Sweden) Johan Stigefelt	TSR-Honda	23	+58.740	19	5
12	41	(Netherlands) Jarno Janssen	TSR-Honda	23	+1:08.906	14	4
13	42	(Spain) David Checa	TSR-Honda	23	+1:09.056	22	3
14	20	(Spain) Jerónimo Vidal	Aprilia	23	+1:12.935	26	2
15	26	(Germany) Klaus Nöhles	Aprilia	23	+1:16.235	12	1
16	22	(France) Sébastien Gimbert	TSR-Honda	23	+1:16.403	29	
17	31	(Spain) Lucas Oliver	Yamaha	23	+1:24.739	27	
18	10	(Spain) Fonsi Nieto	Yamaha	23	+1:24.826	25	
19	24	(United Kingdom) Jason Vincent	Aprilia	23	+1:38.584	11	
20	18	(Malaysia) Shahrol Yuzy	Yamaha	23	+1:38.693	15	
21	15	(United Kingdom) Adrian Coates	Aprilia	23	+1:54.290	16	
22	23	(France) Julien Allemand	Yamaha	22	+1 lap	28	
Ret	33	(Spain) David Tomás	Honda	20	Retirement	31	
Ret	37	(Italy) Luca Boscoscuro	Aprilia	15	Retirement	21	
Ret	30	(Spain) Alex Debón	Aprilia	15	Retirement	8	
Ret	54	(Spain) David García	Aprilia	14	Retirement	23	
Ret	11	(Italy) Ivan Clementi	Aprilia	9	Retirement	18	
Ret	38	(Spain) Álvaro Molina	TSR-Honda	9	Retirement	30	
Ret	9	(Argentina) Sebastián Porto	Yamaha	5	Accident	13	
Ret	44	(Italy) Roberto Rolfo	Aprilia	5	Retirement	20	
Ret	34	(Italy) Marcellino Lucchi	Aprilia	0	Accident	6	
DNS	27	(Italy) Fabrizio De Marco	Honda	0	Did not start	32	

== 125 cc classification ==
Pos.	No.	Rider	Manufacturer	Laps	Time/Retired	Grid	Points
1	16	(Italy) Simone Sanna	Aprilia	22	47:54.390	12	25
2	3	(Japan) Masao Azuma	Honda	22	+10.770	11	20
3	23	(Italy) Gino Borsoi	Aprilia	22	+11.012	13	16
4	21	(France) Arnaud Vincent	Aprilia	22	+32.298	21	13
5	35	(Germany) Reinhard Stolz	Honda	22	+1:14.098	22	11
6	22	(Spain) Pablo Nieto	Derbi	22	+1:23.253	5	10
7	11	(Italy) Max Sabbatani	Honda	22	+1:27.049	20	9
8	18	(Spain) Antonio Elías	Honda	22	+1:37.000	19	8
9	29	(Spain) Ángel Nieto Jr.	Honda	22	+1:40.199	23	7
10	24	(United Kingdom) Leon Haslam	Italjet	22	+1:46.951	24	6
11	26	(Italy) Ivan Goi	Honda	22	+1:50.843	17	5
12	34	(Andorra) Eric Bataille	Honda	22	+2:09.311	27	4
13	12	(France) Randy de Puniet	Aprilia	21	+1 lap	14	3
14	45	(Spain) Iván Martínez	Aprilia	21	+1 lap	26	2
Ret	9	(Italy) Lucio Cecchinello	Honda	14	Accident	4	
Ret	15	(San Marino) Alex de Angelis	Honda	14	Accident	8	
Ret	50	(Spain) Joaquín Perera	Honda	14	Accident	28	
Ret	17	(Germany) Steve Jenkner	Honda	13	Accident	10	
Ret	51	(Italy) Marco Petrini	Aprilia	12	Accident	18	
Ret	4	(Italy) Roberto Locatelli	Aprilia	7	Accident	1	
Ret	54	(San Marino) Manuel Poggiali	Derbi	7	Retirement	15	
Ret	10	(Spain) Adrián Araujo	Honda	3	Retirement	25	
Ret	1	(Spain) Emilio Alzamora	Honda	2	Accident	7	
Ret	53	(San Marino) William de Angelis	Aprilia	2	Accident	16	
Ret	8	(Italy) Gianluigi Scalvini	Aprilia	2	Accident	6	
Ret	41	(Japan) Youichi Ui	Derbi	0	Accident	2	
Ret	5	(Japan) Noboru Ueda	Honda	0	Accident	3	
DNS	39	(Czech Republic) Jaroslav Huleš	Italjet	0	Did not start	9	
WD	32	(Italy) Mirko Giansanti	Honda		Withdrew		
WD	47	(Spain) Ángel Rodríguez	Aprilia		Withdrew		

== Championship standings after the race (500cc) ==
Below are the standings for the top five riders and constructors after round seven has concluded.

Riders' Championship standings

Pos.	Rider	Points
1	(United States) Kenny Roberts Jr.	125
2	(Spain) Carlos Checa	100
3	(Japan) Norifumi Abe	85
4	(Italy) Loris Capirossi	73
5	(Japan) Nobuatsu Aoki	72

Constructors' Championship standings

Pos.	Constructor	Points
1	(Japan) Yamaha	150
2	(Japan) Suzuki	128
3	(Japan) Honda	124
4	(Italy) Aprilia	48
5	(Japan) TSR-Honda	38

- Note: Only the top five positions are included for both sets of standings.

Previous race: 2000 Italian Grand Prix	FIM Grand Prix World Championship; 2000 season	Next race: 2000 Dutch TT
Previous race: 1999 Catalan Grand Prix	Catalan Grand Prix	Next race: 2001 Catalan Grand Prix
