= 2000 Dutch TT =

(Netherlands) 2000 Dutch Grand Prix
Race details
- Race 8 of 16 races in the 2000 Grand Prix motorcycle racing season
- Date: 24 June 2000
- Official name: Rizla+ Dutch TT
- Location: TT Circuit Assen
- Course: Permanent racing facility; 6.049 km (3.759 mi)

500cc
Pole position
- Rider: (Italy) Loris Capirossi
- Time: 2:02.058
Fastest lap
- Rider: (Italy) Max Biaggi
- Time: 2:03.898 on lap 3
Podium
- First: (Brazil) Alex Barros
- Second: (Spain) Àlex Crivillé
- Third: (Italy) Loris Capirossi

250cc
Pole position
- Rider: (Germany) Ralf Waldmann
- Time: 2:05.059
Fastest lap
- Rider: (Japan) Shinya Nakano
- Time: 2:18.667 on lap 18
Podium
- First: (Japan) Tohru Ukawa
- Second: (France) Olivier Jacque
- Third: (Japan) Shinya Nakano

125cc
Pole position
- Rider: (Japan) Youichi Ui
- Time: 2:18.942
Fastest lap
- Rider: (Japan) Noboru Ueda
- Time: 2:24.177 on lap 17
Podium
- First: (Japan) Youichi Ui
- Second: (Japan) Noboru Ueda
- Third: (San Marino) Manuel Poggiali

The 2000 Dutch TT was the eighth round of the 2000 Grand Prix motorcycle racing season. It took place on 24 June 2000 at the TT Circuit Assen located in Assen, Netherlands.

== 500 cc classification ==
| Pos. | No. | Rider | Team | Manufacturer | Laps | Time/Retired | Grid | Points |
|---|---|---|---|---|---|---|---|---|
| 1 | 10 | (Brazil) Alex Barros | Emerson Honda Pons | Honda | 20 | 42:46.142 | 4 | 25 |
| 2 | 1 | (Spain) Àlex Crivillé | Repsol YPF Honda Team | Honda | 20 | +2.077 | 2 | 20 |
| 3 | 65 | (Italy) Loris Capirossi | Emerson Honda Pons | Honda | 20 | +2.907 | 1 | 16 |
| 4 | 4 | (Italy) Max Biaggi | Marlboro Yamaha Team | Yamaha | 20 | +4.880 | 5 | 13 |
| 5 | 7 | (Spain) Carlos Checa | Marlboro Yamaha Team | Yamaha | 20 | +7.394 | 9 | 11 |
| 6 | 46 | (Italy) Valentino Rossi | Nastro Azzurro Honda | Honda | 20 | +11.768 | 6 | 10 |
| 7 | 5 | (Spain) Sete Gibernau | Repsol YPF Honda Team | Honda | 20 | +12.232 | 14 | 9 |
| 8 | 55 | (France) Régis Laconi | Red Bull Yamaha WCM | Yamaha | 20 | +15.397 | 10 | 8 |
| 9 | 17 | (Netherlands) Jurgen van den Goorbergh | Rizla Honda | TSR-Honda | 20 | +20.905 | 13 | 7 |
| 10 | 6 | (Japan) Norick Abe | Antena 3 Yamaha d'Antin | Yamaha | 20 | +22.156 | 15 | 6 |
| 11 | 8 | (Japan) Tadayuki Okada | Repsol YPF Honda Team | Honda | 20 | +28.750 | 7 | 5 |
| 12 | 31 | (Japan) Tetsuya Harada | Blu Aprilia Team | Aprilia | 20 | +34.521 | 8 | 4 |
| 13 | 9 | (Japan) Nobuatsu Aoki | Telefónica Movistar Suzuki | Suzuki | 20 | +47.713 | 12 | 3 |
| 14 | 11 | (Spain) José David de Gea | Proton Team KR | Modenas KR3 | 20 | +1:22.071 | 17 | 2 |
| 15 | 24 | (Australia) Garry McCoy | Red Bull Yamaha WCM | Yamaha | 20 | +1:54.359 | 16 | 1 |
| Ret | 20 | (United Kingdom) Phil Giles | Sabre Sport | Honda | 19 | Retirement | 20 | |
| Ret | 18 | (France) Sebastién Le Grelle | Tecmas Honda Elf | Honda | 11 | Accident | 18 | |
| Ret | 15 | (Japan) Yoshiteru Konishi | FCC TSR | TSR-Honda | 7 | Retirement | 19 | |
| Ret | 2 | (United States) Kenny Roberts Jr. | Telefónica Movistar Suzuki | Suzuki | 0 | Accident | 3 | |
| Ret | 99 | (United Kingdom) Jeremy McWilliams | Blu Aprilia Team | Aprilia | 0 | Retirement | 11 | |

== 250 cc classification ==
| Pos. | No. | Rider | Manufacturer | Laps | Time/Retired | Grid | Points |
|---|---|---|---|---|---|---|---|
| 1 | 4 | (Japan) Tohru Ukawa | Honda | 18 | 42:58.958 | 5 | 25 |
| 2 | 19 | (France) Olivier Jacque | Yamaha | 18 | +5.954 | 4 | 20 |
| 3 | 56 | (Japan) Shinya Nakano | Yamaha | 18 | +7.986 | 3 | 16 |
| 4 | 14 | (Australia) Anthony West | Honda | 18 | +10.981 | 22 | 13 |
| 5 | 8 | (Japan) Naoki Matsudo | Yamaha | 18 | +41.983 | 14 | 11 |
| 6 | 77 | (United Kingdom) Jamie Robinson | Aprilia | 18 | +46.491 | 8 | 10 |
| 7 | 9 | (Argentina) Sebastián Porto | Yamaha | 18 | +47.470 | 12 | 9 |
| 8 | 74 | (Japan) Daijiro Kato | Honda | 18 | +1:00.943 | 6 | 8 |
| 9 | 44 | (Italy) Roberto Rolfo | Aprilia | 18 | +1:08.157 | 23 | 7 |
| 10 | 25 | (France) Vincent Philippe | TSR-Honda | 18 | +1:17.561 | 24 | 6 |
| 11 | 23 | (France) Julien Allemand | Yamaha | 18 | +1:19.304 | 16 | 5 |
| 12 | 22 | (France) Sébastien Gimbert | TSR-Honda | 18 | +1:22.928 | 28 | 4 |
| 13 | 31 | (Spain) Lucas Oliver | Yamaha | 18 | +1:28.467 | 27 | 3 |
| 14 | 33 | (Spain) David Tomás | Honda | 18 | +1:29.495 | 25 | 2 |
| 15 | 42 | (Spain) David Checa | TSR-Honda | 18 | +1:29.686 | 21 | 1 |
| 16 | 10 | (Spain) Fonsi Nieto | Yamaha | 18 | +2:04.463 | 26 | |
| 17 | 63 | (Netherlands) Arnold Litjens | Honda | 17 | +1 lap | 32 | |
| 18 | 26 | (Germany) Klaus Nöhles | Aprilia | 17 | +1 lap | 7 | |
| 19 | 24 | (United Kingdom) Jason Vincent | Aprilia | 17 | +1 lap | 18 | |
| 20 | 21 | (Italy) Franco Battaini | Aprilia | 17 | +1 lap | 9 | |
| 21 | 16 | (Sweden) Johan Stigefelt | TSR-Honda | 17 | +1 lap | 10 | |
| 22 | 37 | (Italy) Luca Boscoscuro | Aprilia | 17 | +1 lap | 15 | |
| 23 | 11 | (Italy) Ivan Clementi | Aprilia | 17 | +1 lap | 11 | |
| 24 | 6 | (Germany) Ralf Waldmann | Aprilia | 16 | +2 laps | 1 | |
| 25 | 64 | (Netherlands) Gert Pieper | Honda | 16 | +2 laps | 31 | |
| Ret | 41 | (Netherlands) Jarno Janssen | TSR-Honda | 15 | Accident | 19 | |
| Ret | 13 | (Italy) Marco Melandri | Aprilia | 13 | Retirement | 2 | |
| Ret | 62 | (Netherlands) Jan Blok | Honda | 12 | Accident | 30 | |
| Ret | 15 | (United Kingdom) Adrian Coates | Aprilia | 6 | Accident | 20 | |
| Ret | 30 | (Spain) Alex Debón | Aprilia | 5 | Accident | 17 | |
| Ret | 61 | (Netherlands) Rob Filart | Honda | 2 | Retirement | 29 | |
| Ret | 18 | (Malaysia) Shahrol Yuzy | Yamaha | 1 | Retirement | 13 | |

== 125 cc classification ==
| Pos. | No. | Rider | Manufacturer | Laps | Time/Retired | Grid | Points |
|---|---|---|---|---|---|---|---|
| 1 | 41 | (Japan) Youichi Ui | Derbi | 17 | 42:04.508 | 1 | 25 |
| 2 | 5 | (Japan) Noboru Ueda | Honda | 17 | +2.380 | 2 | 20 |
| 3 | 54 | (San Marino) Manuel Poggiali | Derbi | 17 | +2.781 | 23 | 16 |
| 4 | 9 | (Italy) Lucio Cecchinello | Honda | 17 | +18.203 | 24 | 13 |
| 5 | 16 | (Italy) Simone Sanna | Aprilia | 17 | +24.482 | 4 | 11 |
| 6 | 4 | (Italy) Roberto Locatelli | Aprilia | 17 | +25.449 | 8 | 10 |
| 7 | 17 | (Germany) Steve Jenkner | Honda | 17 | +26.179 | 6 | 9 |
| 8 | 26 | (Italy) Ivan Goi | Honda | 17 | +34.507 | 9 | 8 |
| 9 | 3 | (Japan) Masao Azuma | Honda | 17 | +40.846 | 17 | 7 |
| 10 | 29 | (Spain) Ángel Nieto Jr. | Honda | 17 | +41.000 | 16 | 6 |
| 11 | 23 | (Italy) Gino Borsoi | Aprilia | 17 | +57.628 | 15 | 5 |
| 12 | 35 | (Germany) Reinhard Stolz | Honda | 17 | +1:08.205 | 19 | 4 |
| 13 | 21 | (France) Arnaud Vincent | Aprilia | 17 | +1:24.340 | 11 | 3 |
| 14 | 15 | (San Marino) Alex de Angelis | Honda | 17 | +1:28.651 | 10 | 2 |
| 15 | 11 | (Italy) Max Sabbatani | Honda | 17 | +1:32.682 | 12 | 1 |
| 16 | 51 | (Italy) Marco Petrini | Aprilia | 17 | +1:46.208 | 26 | |
| 17 | 70 | (Netherlands) Patrick Lakerveld | Honda | 17 | +1:46.383 | 27 | |
| 18 | 24 | (United Kingdom) Leon Haslam | Italjet | 17 | +1:51.279 | 20 | |
| 19 | 22 | (Spain) Pablo Nieto | Derbi | 17 | +1:51.415 | 13 | |
| 20 | 68 | (Netherlands) Wilhelm van Leeuwen | Honda | 17 | +2:19.281 | 21 | |
| 21 | 65 | (Netherlands) Harold de Haan | Honda | 17 | +2:24.301 | 29 | |
| 22 | 69 | (Netherlands) Ronnie Timmer | Honda | 17 | +2:26.871 | 25 | |
| Ret | 1 | (Spain) Emilio Alzamora | Honda | 16 | Retirement | 3 | |
| Ret | 18 | (Spain) Antonio Elías | Honda | 15 | Retirement | 14 | |
| Ret | 34 | (Andorra) Eric Bataille | Honda | 13 | Accident | 28 | |
| Ret | 53 | (San Marino) William de Angelis | Aprilia | 13 | Accident | 22 | |
| Ret | 39 | (Czech Republic) Jaroslav Huleš | Italjet | 10 | Accident | 5 | |
| Ret | 12 | (France) Randy de Puniet | Aprilia | 5 | Accident | 7 | |
| Ret | 8 | (Italy) Gianluigi Scalvini | Aprilia | 4 | Retirement | 18 | |
| Ret | 10 | (Spain) Adrián Araujo | Honda | 0 | Accident | 30 | |

== Championship standings after the race (500cc) ==
Below are the standings for the top five riders and constructors after round eight has concluded.

Riders' Championship standings

| Pos. | Rider | Points |
|---|---|---|
| 1 | (United States) Kenny Roberts Jr. | 125 |
| 2 | (Spain) Carlos Checa | 111 |
| 3 | (Japan) Norifumi Abe | 91 |
| 4 | (Italy) Loris Capirossi | 89 |
| 5 | (Spain) Àlex Crivillé | 79 |

Constructors' Championship standings

| Pos. | Constructor | Points |
|---|---|---|
| 1 | (Japan) Yamaha | 163 |
| 2 | (Japan) Honda | 149 |
| 3 | (Japan) Suzuki | 131 |
| 4 | (Italy) Aprilia | 52 |
| 5 | (Japan) TSR-Honda | 45 |

- Note: Only the top five positions are included for both sets of standings.

| Previous race: 2000 Catalan Grand Prix | FIM Grand Prix World Championship; 2000 season | Next race: 2000 British Grand Prix |
| Previous race: 1999 Dutch TT | Dutch TT | Next race: 2001 Dutch TT |
