= Matthieu Lagrive =

French motorcycle racer

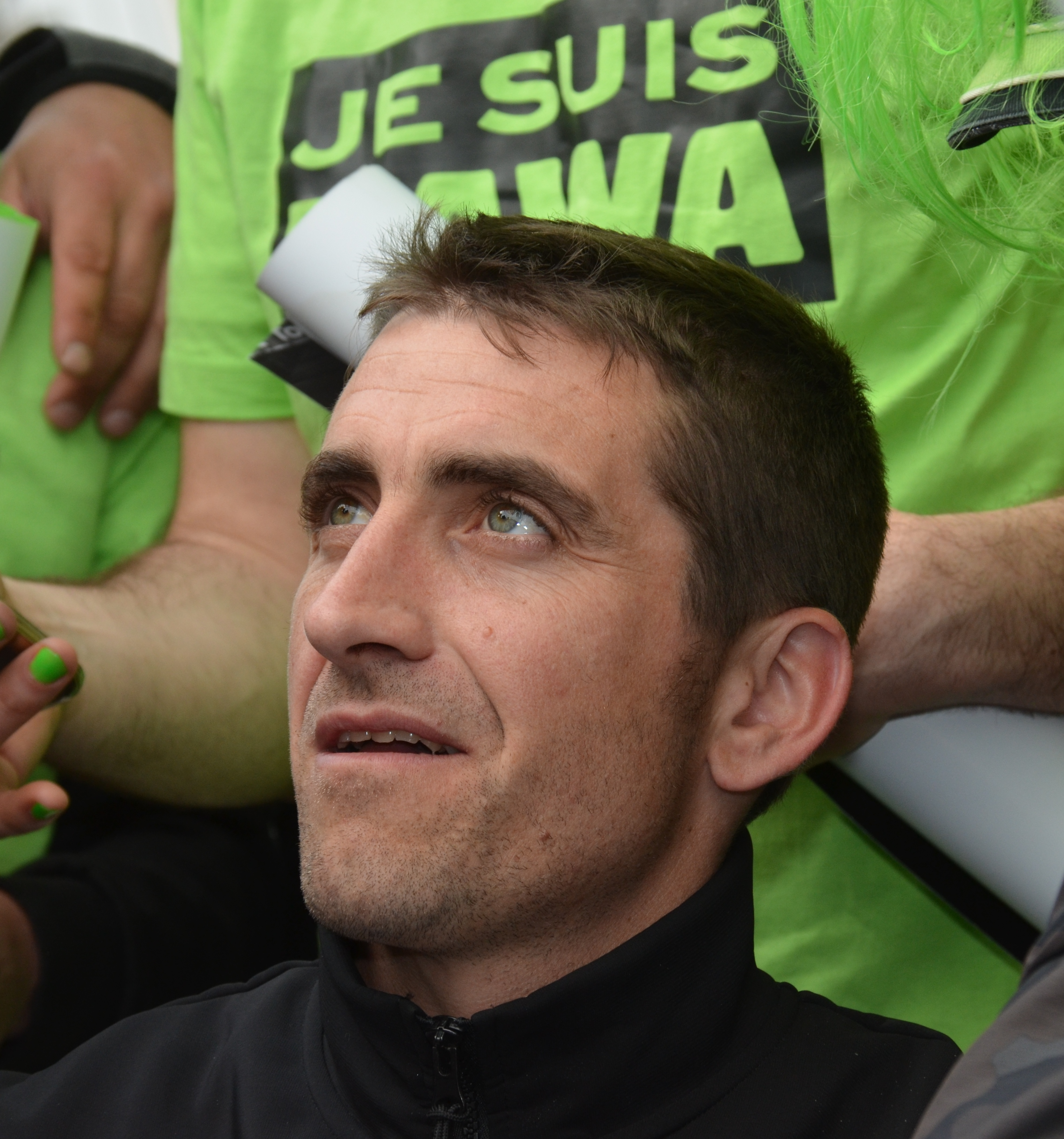
- Nationality: French
- Born: 7 December 1979 (age 46); Lisieux, France
- Current team: Wepol Racing
- Bike number: 45
Motorcycle racing career statistics
250cc World Championship
| Active years | 1998 |
| Manufacturers | Honda |
| Championships | 0 |
| 1998 championship position | NC (0 pts) |
Starts / Wins / Podiums / Poles / F. laps / Points; 5 / 0 / 0 / 0 / 0 / 0
Superbike World Championship
| Active years | 2009, 2016 |
| Manufacturers | Honda, Kawasaki |
| Championships | 0 |
| 2016 championship position | 23rd (11 pts) |
Starts / Wins / Podiums / Poles / F. laps / Points; 14 / 0 / 0 / 0 / 0 / 45
Supersport World Championship
| Active years | 2002–2010, 2013 |
| Manufacturers | Yamaha, Suzuki, Honda, Triumph, Kawasaki |
| Championships | 0 |
| 2013 championship position | NC (0 pts) |
Starts / Wins / Podiums / Poles / F. laps / Points; 85 / 0 / 1 / 2 / 0 / 337

Matthieu Lagrive (born 7 December 1979) is a French motorcycle racer. He races in the International Road Race Championship, aboard a Yamaha YZF-R6. He is a four times FIM Endurance World Champion.

Lagrive was supposed to make his Isle of Man TT debut in 2023, but he suffered multiple serious injuries after an accident in practice.

== Accomplishments ==
- 1994: Competition debut
- 1996:
  - Winner of the Cagiva Cup
  - 3rd place in the Promosport 125cc
- 1997:
  - Selected for the French motorcycle team Vitesse Espoir
  - 3rd place in the France 250cc Championship (Honda RS)
  - 12th place in the Europe 250cc Championship
- 1998:
  - 4th place in the France 250cc Championship
  - Participated in five 250cc Grand Prix for Team Tech 3 (Honda RS)
- 2000:
  - Winner of the "Coupe BMW Boxer Cup" at Magny-Cours
  - Participated in the 600cc Supersport Championships of France and Europe
- 2001:
  - 2nd place in the 600cc France Supersport Championship (Yamaha R6)
  - 4th place in the 600cc Europe Supersport Championship (Yamaha R6)
  - 3rd place in the Spa 24 Hours (Yamaha R7)
- 2002:
  - 21st place in the Supersport World Championship (Team Yamaha SAVEKO)
  - 3rd place in the 24 Hours of Le Mans (Yamaha R7)
- 2003:
  - 16th place in the Supersport World Championship (Team Yamaha Motor France)
  - 2nd place in the Bol d'Or (Yamaha R7)
- 2004:
  - 14th place in the Supersport World Championship (Team Suzuki Moto 1)
  - 2nd place in the FIM Endurance World Championship (Suzuki Endurance Racing Team)
  - Winner of the Bol d'Or (Suzuki Endurance Racing Team)
- 2005:
  - Winner of the FIM Endurance World Championship (Suzuki Endurance Racing Team)
  - Winner of France SUPERPRODUCTION (Junior Team Suzuki)
  - Winner of the Bol d'Or (Suzuki Endurance Racing Team)
  - 2nd place in the 24 Hours of Le Mans (Suzuki Endurance Racing Team)
- 2006:
  - Winner of the FIM Endurance World Championship (Suzuki Endurance Racing Team)
  - Winner of the Bol d'Or (Suzuki Endurance Racing Team)
  - 1st in the 24 Hours of Oschersleben (Suzuki Endurance Racing Team)
  - Winner of the 500 km of Assen (Suzuki Endurance Racing Team)
  - 1st in the 8 Hours of Albacete (Suzuki Endurance Racing Team)
  - 1st in the 6 Hours of Zolder (Suzuki Endurance Racing Team)
  - 2nd in the 24 Hours of Le Mans (Suzuki Endurance Racing Team)
  - 38th in the 8 Hours of Suzuka (Suzuki Endurance Racing Team)
- 2007:
  - 2nd in the 24 Hours of Le Mans (Suzuki Endurance Racing Team)
  - 2nd in the 6 Hours of Albacete (Suzuki Endurance Racing Team)
  - 2nd in the Bol d'Or (Suzuki Endurance Racing Team)
  - Winner of the FIM Endurance World Championship (Suzuki Endurance Racing Team)
- 2008:
  - Pole position in the World Supersport at Brands Hatch (Honda CBR 600RR)
  - Pole position in the World Supersport at Donington (Honda CBR 600RR)
  - 2nd in the 6 Hours of Albacete
  - Winner of the Bol d'Or (Suzuki Endurance Racing Team)
  - 2nd in the 24 Hours of Le Mans (Suzuki Endurance Racing Team)
  - Winner of the FIM Endurance World Championship (Suzuki Endurance Racing Team)

== Career statistics ==
=== Grand Prix motorcycle racing ===
==== Races by year ====
(key) (Races in bold indicate pole position) (Races in italics indicate fastest lap)

| Year | Class | Bike | 1 | 2 | 3 | 4 | 5 | 6 | 7 | 8 | 9 | 10 | 11 | 12 | 13 | 14 | Pos | Pts |
|---|---|---|---|---|---|---|---|---|---|---|---|---|---|---|---|---|---|---|
| 1998 | 250cc | Honda | JPN | MAL | SPA | ITA | FRA; DNS | MAD | NED | GBR | GER | CZE; 19 | IMO; 22 | CAT; 19 | AUS; 18 | ARG; 16 | NC | 0 |

=== Supersport World Championship ===
==== Races by year ====
(key) (Races in bold indicate pole position) (Races in italics indicate fastest lap)

| Year | Bike | 1 | 2 | 3 | 4 | 5 | 6 | 7 | 8 | 9 | 10 | 11 | 12 | 13 | 14 | Pos | Pts |
|---|---|---|---|---|---|---|---|---|---|---|---|---|---|---|---|---|---|
| 2002 | Yamaha | SPA | AUS | RSA | JPN | ITA; 11 | GBR; 10 | GER; Ret | SMR; Ret | GBR; 19 | GER; 12 | NED; 17 | ITA; 13 | | | 21st | 18 |
| 2003 | Yamaha | SPA; 15 | AUS; 21 | JPN; 18 | ITA; 19 | GER; 12 | GBR; 9 | SMR; 11 | GBR; 17 | NED; 18 | ITA; 11 | FRA; 7 | | | | 16th | 31 |
| 2004 | Yamaha | SPA; 11 | AUS; 15 | SMR; 13 | ITA; 9 | GER; 16 | GBR; 15 | GBR; 15 | NED; 14 | ITA; 19 | FRA; 9 | | | | | 14th | 27 |
| 2005 | Suzuki | QAT | AUS | SPA | ITA | EUR | SMR | CZE; 14 | GBR; 9 | NED; 11 | GER; Ret | ITA; 10 | FRA; 10 | | | 15th | 26 |
| 2006 | Honda | QAT | AUS | SPA | ITA | EUR; 8 | SMR; 13 | CZE; Ret | GBR; 19 | NED; Ret | GER; 9 | ITA; Ret | FRA | | | 23rd | 18 |
| 2007 | Honda | QAT | AUS; Ret | EUR; Ret | SPA; DNS | NED | ITA; Ret | GBR; 6 | SMR; 12 | CZE; Ret | GBR; 10 | GER; 3 | ITA; 6 | FRA | | 14th | 46 |
| 2008 | Honda | QAT; 5 | AUS; 17 | SPA; 13 | NED; 10 | ITA; 8 | GER; Ret | SMR; Ret | CZE; 8 | **GBR**; 19 | **EUR**; 9 | ITA; Ret | FRA; 4 | POR; Ret | | 13th | 56 |
| 2009 | Honda | AUS; 11 | QAT; 6 | SPA; 6 | NED; Ret | ITA; 16 | RSA; 10 | USA; 9 | SMR | GBR | CZE | GER | ITA | FRA; 9 | POR | 14th | 45 |
| 2010 | Triumph | AUS | POR; Ret | SPA; 7 | NED; 5 | ITA; 6 | RSA; 6 | USA; 12 | SMR; 11 | CZE; 9 | GBR; 7 | GER; Ret | ITA; 11 | FRA | | 11th | 70 |
| 2013 | Kawasaki | AUS | SPA | NED | ITA | GBR | POR | ITA | RUS | GBR | GER | TUR | FRA; Ret | SPA; 18 | | NC | 0 |

=== Superbike World Championship ===
==== Races by year ====
(key) (Races in bold indicate pole position) (Races in italics indicate fastest lap)

| Year | Bike | 1 | | 2 | | 3 | | 4 | | 5 | | 6 | | 7 | | 8 | | 9 | | 10 | | 11 | | 12 | | 13 | | 14 | | Pos | Pts |
| Year | Bike | R1 | R2 | R1 | R2 | R1 | R2 | R1 | R2 | R1 | R2 | R1 | R2 | R1 | R2 | R1 | R2 | R1 | R2 | R1 | R2 | R1 | R2 | R1 | R2 | R1 | R2 | R1 | R2 | Pos | Pts |
|---|---|---|---|---|---|---|---|---|---|---|---|---|---|---|---|---|---|---|---|---|---|---|---|---|---|---|---|---|---|---|---|
| 2009 | Honda | AUS | AUS | QAT | QAT | SPA | SPA | NED | NED | ITA | ITA | RSA | RSA | USA | USA | SMR; 10 | SMR; 21 | GBR; 16 | GBR; 12 | CZE; 9 | CZE; 14 | GER; 11 | GER; Ret | ITA; Ret | ITA; Ret | FRA | FRA | POR; 9 | POR; 13 | 19th | 34 |
| 2016 | Kawasaki | AUS | AUS | THA | THA | SPA | SPA | NED | NED | ITA | ITA | MAL | MAL | GBR | GBR | ITA | ITA | USA | USA | GER | GER | FRA; 6 | FRA; 15 | SPA | SPA | QAT | QAT | | | 23rd | 11 |

=== FIM Endurance World Championship ===
==== By team ====
| Year | Team | Bike | Rider | TC |
|---|---|---|---|---|
| 2001 | (France) Free Bike Performance | Suzuki GSX-R1000 | (France) Eric Mizera (France) Bertrand Sebileau (France) Matthieu Lagrive (France) Cyril Fernandez | 2nd |
| 2004 | (France) Suzuki Castrol | Suzuki GSX-R1000 | (France) Olivier Four (France) Vincent Philippe (France) Matthieu Lagrive | 2nd |
| 2005 | (France) Suzuki Castrol | Suzuki GSX-R1000 | (Japan) Keiichi Kitagawa (France) Vincent Philippe (France) Matthieu Lagrive | 1st |
| 2006 | (France) Suzuki Castrol | Suzuki GSX-R1000 | (Japan) Keiichi Kitagawa (France) Vincent Philippe (France) Matthieu Lagrive | 1st |
| 2007 | (France) Suzuki Endurance Racing Team | Suzuki GSX-R1000 | (France) Julien Da Costa (France) Vincent Philippe (France) Matthieu Lagrive | 1st |
| 2008 | (France) Suzuki Endurance Racing Team | Suzuki GSX-R1000 | (France) Julien Da Costa (France) Vincent Philippe (France) Matthieu Lagrive (France) Guillaume Dietrich | 1st |
| 2011 | (France) GMT94 | Yamaha YZF-R1 | (France) Kenny Foray (France) Matthieu Lagrive (Spain) David Checa | 3rd |
| 2012 | (France) GMT94 | Yamaha YZF-R1 | (France) Kenny Foray (France) Matthieu Lagrive (France) Gwen Giabbani (Spain) David Checa | 3rd |
| 2013 | (France) GMT94 | Yamaha YZF-R1 | (Spain) David Checa (France) Kenny Foray (France) Matthieu Lagrive (France) Maxime Berger | 2nd |
