= Osamu Miyazaki =

Japanese motorcycle racer

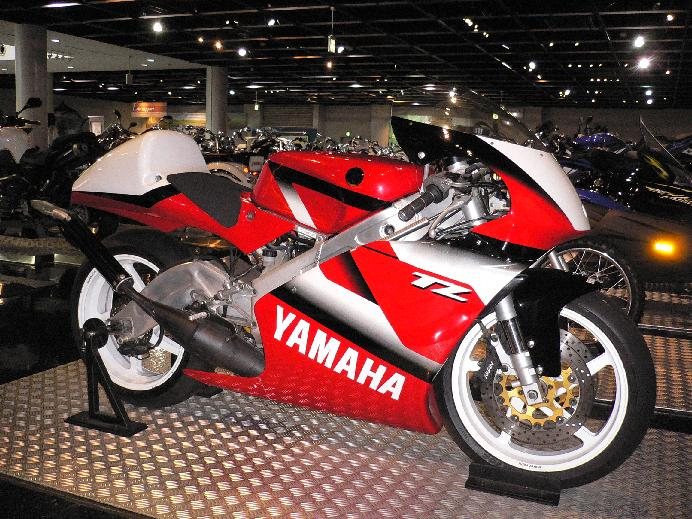
- Yamaha TZ250 similar to that which Miyazaki rode
- Nationality: Japanese
- Born: January 23, 1966 (age 60); Yamaguchi, Japan
Motorcycle racing career statistics
Grand Prix motorcycle racing
Active years	1991 - 2002
First race	1991 250cc Japanese Grand Prix
Last race	2002 250cc Japanese Grand Prix
First win	2002 250cc Japanese Grand Prix
Team(s)	Aprilia, Yamaha
Starts / Wins / Podiums / Poles / F. laps / Points; 47 / 1 / 1 / 0 / 1 / 129

Osamu Miyazaki (born 23 January 1966) is a Japanese former professional Grand Prix motorcycle road racer. He was the first full-time rider in the championship from Japan. After winning his first race in the All Japan Road Race Championship at the age of 26, Miyazaki joined Aprilia and moved to Italy in 1996 to compete in the Grand Prix. After riding with Aprilia for three seasons, he raced with Yamaha, and helped them with the development of the TZ 250 and YZF-R6. In 2002, he won the Japanese Grand Prix. During his time with Aprilia and Yamaha, he had ridden with different teams, including Edo Racing and Motorex Daytona Yamaha. He left the Grand Prix circuit in 2004 to race in the All Japan Road Race Championship. He started his own team in 2008 and retired after the 2011 season.

== Motorcycling career ==
Osamu Miyazaki was born on 23 January 1966 in Yamaguchi, Japan. He started racing when he was 23, when he entered the All Japan Road Race Championship riding 250 cc motorcycles, and won his first race in the championship three seasons later. At that time, he migrated to the Grand Prix, initially competing in the 1991 Japanese race. He subsequently entered the race the following year, coming thirteenth overall. Following this success, he joined the Italian Aprilia team, which at the time was not well known in Japan. He achieved his first points in 1995. He moved to Italy to race in the Grand Prix professionally, the second Japanese rider at the Championships and the first Japanese contender to participate full-time. In 1996, he was the last official "supply team" works bike rider and the only Japanese rider with Aprilia in the class. He raced as a member of the Japanese Edo Racing team but continued to race Aprilia bikes.

For the 1997 Grand Prix season, Miyazaki raced production Yamaha bikes. He remained with the Japanese Edo Racing team but received support from Yamaha in kit parts. Entering as a Japanese wildcard, he achieved his first win at the 2002 Japanese motorcycle Grand Prix at Suzuka while racing with Motorex Daytona Yamaha. He started in eighth place and finished almost ten seconds ahead of the next competitor. He also achieved the record for the fastest circuit, with a time of two minutes 23.895 seconds and a top speed of 143.633 km/h (89.249 mph), a record that stood for a year. The season was his last with the Grand Prix.

In 2004, Miyazaki moved to racing 600 cc motorcycles in the All Japan Road Race Championships. After four years, he had achieved second place at the end of the season. He started his own team in 2008 and took pole position the following year in the third round at Autopolis, but suffered a serious injury at the end of the season. He subsequently raced in 2010 and 2011, retiring shortly afterwards.

== Legacy ==
Miyazaki was involved in the development of the Yamaha TZ 250 and Yamaha YZF-R6. He worked with Dunlop Tyres in tyre R&D in 2004 and coached Chinese competitors in 2009.

== Career statistics ==
=== Grand Prix motorcycle racing ===
==== Races by year ====
(key) (Races in bold indicate pole position)

Year	Class	Bike	1	2	3	4	5	6	7	8	9	10	11	12	13	14	15	16	17	Pos	Pts	Ref
1991	250cc	Yamaha	JPN; 16	AUS	USA	SPA	ITA	GER	AUT	EUR	NED	FRA	GBR	RSM	CZE	VDM	MAL			-	0	
1992	250cc	Yamaha	JPN; 24	AUS	MAL	SPA	ITA	EUR	GER	NED	HUN	FRA	GBR	BRA	RSA					-	0	
1993	250cc	Aprilia	AUS	MAL	JPN; Ret	SPA	AUT	GER	NED	EUR	RSM	GBR	CZE	ITA	USA	FIM				-	0	
1995	250cc	Aprilia	AUS	MAL	JPN; 6	SPA	GER	ITA	NED	FRA	GBR	CZE	BRA	ARG	EUR					24th	10	
1996	250cc	Aprilia	MAL; 15	INA; Ret	JPN; 13	SPA; 15	ITA; 20	FRA; Ret	NED; 8	GER; 12	GBR; 12	AUT; Ret	CZE; Ret	IMO; 16	CAT; 15	BRA; Ret	AUS; NC			20th	22	
1997	250cc	Yamaha	MAL; 11	JPN; Ret	SPA; 12	ITA; 15	AUT; Ret	FRA; 10	NED; 8	IMO; 9	GER; 18	BRA; Ret	GBR; Ret	CZE; 14	CAT; 10	INA; 13	AUS; 11			13th	47	
1998	250cc	Yamaha	JPN; 14	MAL; 15	SPA; 10	ITA; Ret	FRA; Ret	MAD	NED; NC	GBR	GER	CZE; 18	IMO; 18	CAT; 14	AUS; 15	ARG; 14				24th	14	
2000	250cc	Yamaha	RSA	MAL	JPN; 8	SPA	FRA	ITA	CAT	NED	GBR	GER	CZE	POR	VAL	BRA	PAC; DSQ	AUS		27th	8	
2001	250cc	Yamaha	JPN	RSA	SPA	FRA	ITA	CAT	NED	GBR	GER	CZE	POR	VAL	PAC; 13	AUS	MAL	BRA		29th	3	
2002	250cc	Yamaha	JPN; 1	RSA	SPA	FRA	ITA	CAT	NED	GBR	GER	CZE	POR	BRA	PAC	MAL	AUS	VAL		16th	25	
