= 1998 Argentine motorcycle Grand Prix =

(Argentina) 1998 Argentine Grand Prix
Race details
- Race 14 of 14 races in the 1998 Grand Prix motorcycle racing season
- Date: 25 October 1998
- Official name: Gran Premio Marlboro de Argentina
- Location: Autódromo Juan y Oscar Gálvez
- Course: Permanent racing facility; 4.350 km (2.703 mi)

500cc
Pole position
- Rider: (Australia) Mick Doohan
- Time: 1:44.193
Fastest lap
- Rider: (Japan) Tadayuki Okada
- Time: 1:44.122 on lap 24
Podium
- First: (Australia) Mick Doohan
- Second: (Japan) Tadayuki Okada
- Third: (Brazil) Alex Barros

250cc
Pole position
- Rider: (Italy) Loris Capirossi
- Time: 1:45.568
Fastest lap
- Rider: (Italy) Valentino Rossi
- Time: 1:45.473 on lap 6
Podium
- First: (Italy) Valentino Rossi
- Second: (Italy) Loris Capirossi
- Third: (France) Olivier Jacque

125cc
Pole position
- Rider: (Italy) Roberto Locatelli
- Time: 1:50.550
Fastest lap
- Rider: (Japan) Masao Azuma
- Time: 1:49.917 on lap 21
Podium
- First: (Japan) Tomomi Manako
- Second: (Italy) Marco Melandri
- Third: (Italy) Lucio Cecchinello

The 1998 Argentine motorcycle Grand Prix was the last round of the 1998 Grand Prix motorcycle racing season. It took place on 25 October 1998 at the Autódromo Oscar Alfredo Gálvez in Buenos Aires.

The 500cc race was known as being the final 500 cc victory for Australian Mick Doohan, while the 250cc race, won by Valentino Rossi saw a controversial title decider: on the final turn of the race, race and championship leader Tetsuya Harada was struck from behind by teammate and championship rival Loris Capirossi, who ultimately clinched the championship on appeal.

== 500 cc classification ==
Pos.	No.	Rider	Team	Manufacturer	Laps	Time/Retired	Grid	Points
1	1	(Australia) Mick Doohan	Repsol Honda	Honda	27	47:07.332	1	25
2	2	(Japan) Tadayuki Okada	Repsol Honda	Honda	27	+4.762	2	20
3	9	(Brazil) Alex Barros	Honda Gresini	Honda	27	+5.590	8	16
4	5	(Japan) Norick Abe	Yamaha Team Rainey	Yamaha	27	+27.685	17	13
5	6	(Italy) Max Biaggi	Marlboro Team Kanemoto	Honda	27	+30.254	14	11
6	55	(France) Régis Laconi	Red Bull Yamaha WCM	Yamaha	27	+30.441	5	10
7	12	(France) Jean-Michel Bayle	Yamaha Team Rainey	Yamaha	27	+30.647	6	9
8	8	(Spain) Carlos Checa	Movistar Honda Pons	Honda	27	+30.944	3	8
9	15	(Spain) Sete Gibernau	Repsol Honda	Honda	27	+32.808	4	7
10	19	(United States) John Kocinski	Movistar Honda Pons	Honda	27	+41.714	10	6
11	10	(United States) Kenny Roberts Jr.	Team Roberts	Modenas KR3	27	+46.746	11	5
12	3	(Japan) Nobuatsu Aoki	Suzuki Grand Prix Team	Suzuki	27	+48.264	13	4
13	11	(New Zealand) Simon Crafar	Red Bull Yamaha WCM	Yamaha	27	+1:02.063	16	3
14	17	(Netherlands) Jurgen van den Goorbergh	Dee Cee Jeans Racing Team	Honda	27	+1:03.255	15	2
15	28	(Germany) Ralf Waldmann	Marlboro Team Roberts	Modenas KR3	27	+1:06.271	12	1
16	22	(France) Sébastien Gimbert	Tecmas Honda Elf	Honda	27	+1:27.889	18	
17	23	(United States) Matt Wait	FCC TSR	Honda	27	+1:27.960	20	
18	14	(Spain) Juan Borja	Shell Advance Racing	Honda	27	+1:28.404	19	
19	42	(Australia) Craig Connell	Shell Advance Racing	Honda	26	+1 lap	21	
20	57	(Italy) Fabio Carpani	Team Polini Inoxmacel	Honda	26	+1 lap	23	
21	71	(Argentina) Juan Pablo Gianini	Shell Advance Racing	Honda	26	+1 lap	24	
Ret	4	(Spain) Àlex Crivillé	Repsol Honda	Honda	17	Accident	7	
Ret	20	(Italy) Luca Cadalora	MuZ Roc RennSport	MuZ	13	Retirement	9	
DNS	88	(United Kingdom) Scott Smart	Team Millar Honda Britain	Honda	0	Did not start	22	

== 250 cc classification ==
Pos.	No.	Rider	Manufacturer	Laps	Time/Retired	Grid	Points
1	46	(Italy) Valentino Rossi	Aprilia	25	44:26.581	3	25
2	65	(Italy) Loris Capirossi	Aprilia	25	+5.360	1	20
3	19	(France) Olivier Jacque	Honda	25	+27.096	2	16
4	5	(Japan) Tohru Ukawa	Honda	25	+27.451	6	13
5	44	(Italy) Roberto Rolfo	TSR-Honda	25	+30.820	16	11
6	9	(United Kingdom) Jeremy McWilliams	TSR-Honda	25	+41.816	9	10
7	12	(Japan) Noriyasu Numata	Suzuki	25	+42.555	8	9
8	16	(Sweden) Johan Stigefelt	Suzuki	25	+42.708	11	8
9	21	(Italy) Franco Battaini	Yamaha	25	+43.148	7	7
10	37	(Italy) Luca Boscoscuro	TSR-Honda	25	+52.505	15	6
11	7	(Japan) Takeshi Tsujimura	Yamaha	25	+54.131	12	5
12	14	(Italy) Davide Bulega	ERP Honda	25	+1:07.509	19	4
13	45	(Italy) Diego Giugovaz	Aprilia	25	+1:12.506	18	3
14	18	(Japan) Osamu Miyazaki	Yamaha	25	+1:35.028	17	2
15	82	(United Kingdom) Woolsey Coulter	Honda	25	+1:37.371	21	1
16	22	(France) Matthieu Lagrive	Honda	25	+1:42.817	23	
17	41	(Argentina) Federico Gartner	Aprilia	25	+1:45.353	24	
18	97	(Argentina) Diego Ruabén	Honda	24	+1 lap	25	
19	96	(Argentina) Leandro Mulet	Yamaha	24	+1 lap	27	
20	98	(Argentina) Gabriel Borgmann	Yamaha	24	+1 lap	28	
Ret	31	(Japan) Tetsuya Harada	Aprilia	24	Accident	4	
Ret	6	(Japan) Haruchika Aoki	Honda	23	Retirement	13	
Ret	25	(Japan) Yasumasa Hatakeyama	Honda	19	Accident	22	
Ret	8	(Spain) Luis d'Antin	Yamaha	18	Accident	20	
Ret	27	(Argentina) Sebastián Porto	Aprilia	12	Retirement	5	
Ret	17	(Spain) José Luis Cardoso	Yamaha	11	Retirement	10	
Ret	4	(Italy) Stefano Perugini	Honda	10	Retirement	14	
Ret	95	(Argentina) Matías Ríos	Yamaha	1	Retirement	26	

== 125 cc classification ==
Pos.	No.	Rider	Manufacturer	Laps	Time/Retired	Grid	Points
1	3	(Japan) Tomomi Manako	Honda	23	42:43.976	8	25
2	13	(Italy) Marco Melandri	Honda	23	+0.566	2	20
3	10	(Italy) Lucio Cecchinello	Honda	23	+1.137	16	16
4	20	(Japan) Masao Azuma	Honda	23	+1.191	10	13
5	4	(Japan) Kazuto Sakata	Aprilia	23	+16.111	3	11
6	32	(Italy) Mirko Giansanti	Honda	23	+16.314	4	10
7	21	(France) Arnaud Vincent	Aprilia	23	+21.921	7	9
8	5	(Japan) Masaki Tokudome	Aprilia	23	+22.833	13	8
9	2	(Japan) Noboru Ueda	Honda	23	+23.597	11	7
10	8	(Italy) Gianluigi Scalvini	Honda	23	+23.922	15	6
11	26	(Italy) Ivan Goi	Aprilia	23	+23.958	14	5
12	23	(Italy) Gino Borsoi	Aprilia	23	+27.543	12	4
13	9	(France) Frédéric Petit	Honda	23	+27.720	6	3
14	62	(Japan) Yoshiaki Katoh	Yamaha	23	+27.822	22	2
15	41	(Japan) Youichi Ui	Yamaha	23	+42.461	5	1
16	17	(Spain) Enrique Maturana	Yamaha	23	+52.756	21	
17	22	(Germany) Steve Jenkner	Aprilia	23	+54.889	20	
18	39	(Czech Republic) Jaroslav Huleš	Honda	23	+55.022	19	
19	94	(Brazil) Cristiano Vieira	Honda	22	+1 lap	26	
20	97	(Brazil) Sílvio César Zequim	Honda	22	+1 lap	27	
Ret	15	(Italy) Roberto Locatelli	Honda	10	Accident	1	
Ret	16	(Italy) Christian Manna	Yamaha	7	Retirement	24	
Ret	65	(Italy) Andrea Iommi	Honda	6	Accident	18	
Ret	29	(Spain) Ángel Nieto, Jr.	Aprilia	5	Accident	23	
Ret	14	(Italy) Federico Cerroni	Aprilia	5	Retirement	25	
Ret	59	(Spain) Jerónimo Vidal	Aprilia	2	Retirement	17	
DNS	7	(Spain) Emilio Alzamora	Aprilia	0	Did not start	9	
DNQ	95	(Brazil) César Barros	Honda		Did not qualify		

== Championship standings after the race (500cc) ==
Below are the standings for the top five riders and constructors after round fourteen has concluded.

Riders' Championship standings

Pos.	Rider	Points
1	(Australia) Mick Doohan	260
2	(Italy) Max Biaggi	208
3	(Spain) Àlex Crivillé	198
4	(Spain) Carlos Checa	139
5	(Brazil) Alex Barros	138

Constructors' Championship standings

Pos.	Constructor	Points
1	(Japan) Honda	345
2	(Japan) Yamaha	198
3	(Japan) Suzuki	111
4	(Malaysia) Modenas KR3	73
5	(Germany) MuZ	11

- Note: Only the top five positions are included for both sets of standings.

Previous race: 1998 Australian Grand Prix	FIM Grand Prix World Championship; 1998 season	Next race: 1999 Malaysian Grand Prix
Previous race: 1995 Argentine Grand Prix	Argentine Grand Prix	Next race: 1999 Argentine Grand Prix
