= 1998 Catalan motorcycle Grand Prix =

(Catalonia) 1998 Catalan Grand Prix
Race details
- Race 12 of 14 races in the 1998 Grand Prix motorcycle racing season
- Date: 20 September 1998
- Official name: Gran Premi Marlboro de Catalunya
- Location: Circuit de Catalunya
- Course: Permanent racing facility; 4.727 km (2.937 mi)

500cc
Pole position
- Rider: (Spain) Àlex Crivillé
- Time: 1:45.583
Fastest lap
- Rider: (Brazil) Alex Barros
- Time: 1:46.810 on lap 5
Podium
- First: (Australia) Mick Doohan
- Second: (Japan) Tadayuki Okada
- Third: (Japan) Norick Abe

250cc
Pole position
- Rider: (Italy) Loris Capirossi
- Time: 1:47.457
Fastest lap
- Rider: (Italy) Valentino Rossi
- Time: 1:47.585 on lap 5
Podium
- First: (Italy) Valentino Rossi
- Second: (Japan) Tetsuya Harada
- Third: (Italy) Loris Capirossi

125cc
Pole position
- Rider: (Italy) Roberto Locatelli
- Time: 1:52.641
Fastest lap
- Rider: (Italy) Mirko Giansanti
- Time: 1:53.142 on lap 5
Podium
- First: (Japan) Tomomi Manako
- Second: (Italy) Mirko Giansanti
- Third: (Japan) Masao Azuma

The 1998 Catalan motorcycle Grand Prix was the twelfth round of the 1998 Grand Prix motorcycle racing season. It took place on 20 September 1998 at the Circuit de Catalunya. It was the last time that the Catalan Motorcycle Grand Prix was held in September until 2020.

== 500 cc classification ==
Pos.	No.	Rider	Team	Manufacturer	Laps	Time/Retired	Grid	Points
1	1	(Australia) Mick Doohan	Repsol Honda	Honda	25	44:53.264	4	25
2	2	(Japan) Tadayuki Okada	Repsol Honda	Honda	25	+1.974	6	20
3	5	(Japan) Norick Abe	Yamaha Team Rainey	Yamaha	25	+8.260	9	16
4	15	(Spain) Sete Gibernau	Repsol Honda	Honda	25	+20.865	10	13
5	11	(New Zealand) Simon Crafar	Red Bull Yamaha WCM	Yamaha	25	+22.967	16	11
6	8	(Spain) Carlos Checa	Movistar Honda Pons	Honda	25	+24.933	12	10
7	9	(Brazil) Alex Barros	Honda Gresini	Honda	25	+25.764	3	9
8	55	(France) Régis Laconi	Red Bull Yamaha WCM	Yamaha	25	+28.571	14	8
9	19	(United States) John Kocinski	Movistar Honda Pons	Honda	25	+41.358	11	7
10	10	(United States) Kenny Roberts Jr.	Team Roberts	Modenas KR3	25	+41.373	7	6
11	3	(Japan) Nobuatsu Aoki	Suzuki Grand Prix Team	Suzuki	25	+48.310	5	5
12	28	(Germany) Ralf Waldmann	Marlboro Team Roberts	Modenas KR3	25	+50.942	17	4
13	17	(Netherlands) Jurgen van den Goorbergh	Dee Cee Jeans Racing Team	Honda	25	+1:10.545	13	3
14	23	(United States) Matt Wait	FCC TSR	Honda	25	+1:14.721	23	2
15	88	(United Kingdom) Scott Smart	Team Millar Honda Britain	Honda	25	+1:14.779	22	1
16	43	(Italy) Paolo Tessari	Team Paton	Paton	24	+1 lap	25	
Ret	42	(Australia) Craig Connell	Shell Advance Racing	Honda	18	Retirement	21	
Ret	22	(France) Sébastien Gimbert	Tecmas Honda Elf	Honda	12	Retirement	20	
Ret	57	(Italy) Fabio Carpani	Team Polini Inoxmacel	Honda	12	Retirement	24	
Ret	77	(Switzerland) Eskil Suter	MuZ Roc RennSport	MuZ	11	Accident	18	
Ret	14	(Spain) Juan Borja	Shell Advance Racing	Honda	6	Accident	19	
Ret	4	(Spain) Àlex Crivillé	Repsol Honda	Honda	1	Retirement	1	
Ret	12	(France) Jean-Michel Bayle	Yamaha Team Rainey	Yamaha	0	Accident	8	
Ret	27	(Japan) Katsuaki Fujiwara	Suzuki Grand Prix Team	Suzuki	0	Accident	15	
DSQ	6	(Italy) Max Biaggi	Marlboro Team Kanemoto	Honda	18	Black flag	2	

== 250 cc classification ==
Pos.	No.	Rider	Manufacturer	Laps	Time/Retired	Grid	Points
1	46	(Italy) Valentino Rossi	Aprilia	23	41:48.737	2	25
2	31	(Japan) Tetsuya Harada	Aprilia	23	+3.922	5	20
3	65	(Italy) Loris Capirossi	Aprilia	23	+14.048	1	16
4	19	(France) Olivier Jacque	Honda	23	+17.698	6	13
5	5	(Japan) Tohru Ukawa	Honda	23	+29.855	4	11
6	4	(Italy) Stefano Perugini	Honda	23	+38.668	10	10
7	6	(Japan) Haruchika Aoki	Honda	23	+38.701	8	9
8	44	(Italy) Roberto Rolfo	TSR-Honda	23	+38.926	20	8
9	21	(Italy) Franco Battaini	Yamaha	23	+39.048	13	7
10	7	(Japan) Takeshi Tsujimura	Yamaha	23	+46.392	14	6
11	24	(United Kingdom) Jason Vincent	TSR-Honda	23	+46.431	17	5
12	37	(Italy) Luca Boscoscuro	TSR-Honda	23	+46.953	15	4
13	12	(Japan) Noriyasu Numata	Suzuki	23	+49.845	12	3
14	18	(Japan) Osamu Miyazaki	Yamaha	23	+51.142	7	2
15	16	(Sweden) Johan Stigefelt	Suzuki	23	+1:09.499	19	1
16	8	(Spain) Luis d'Antin	Yamaha	23	+1:12.604	16	
17	25	(Japan) Yasumasa Hatakeyama	Honda	23	+1:18.459	23	
18	45	(Italy) Diego Giugovaz	Aprilia	23	+1:18.836	21	
19	22	(France) Matthieu Lagrive	Honda	23	+1:36.751	25	
20	92	(Spain) David García	Yamaha	23	+1:49.034	24	
21	74	(Spain) Lucas Oliver Bultó	Honda	22	+1 lap	29	
22	94	(Spain) David Ortega	Honda	22	+1 lap	28	
Ret	9	(United Kingdom) Jeremy McWilliams	TSR-Honda	19	Accident	11	
Ret	17	(Spain) José Luis Cardoso	Yamaha	17	Retirement	22	
Ret	34	(Italy) Marcellino Lucchi	Aprilia	14	Retirement	3	
Ret	41	(Argentina) Federico Gartner	Aprilia	14	Accident	27	
Ret	93	(Spain) Iván Silva	Honda	13	Retirement	30	
Ret	58	(Spain) Eustaquio Gavira	Honda	6	Retirement	26	
Ret	27	(Argentina) Sebastián Porto	Aprilia	6	Retirement	9	
Ret	14	(Italy) Davide Bulega	ERP Honda	6	Retirement	18	

== 125 cc classification ==
Pos.	No.	Rider	Manufacturer	Laps	Time/Retired	Grid	Points
1	3	(Japan) Tomomi Manako	Honda	22	42:10.704	2	25
2	32	(Italy) Mirko Giansanti	Honda	22	+0.079	6	20
3	20	(Japan) Masao Azuma	Honda	22	+0.096	3	16
4	10	(Italy) Lucio Cecchinello	Honda	22	+0.172	11	13
5	15	(Italy) Roberto Locatelli	Honda	22	+0.336	1	11
6	2	(Japan) Noboru Ueda	Honda	22	+0.724	14	10
7	62	(Japan) Yoshiaki Katoh	Yamaha	22	+0.942	7	9
8	13	(Italy) Marco Melandri	Honda	22	+1.027	12	8
9	4	(Japan) Kazuto Sakata	Aprilia	22	+1.062	4	7
10	8	(Italy) Gianluigi Scalvini	Honda	22	+1.540	13	6
11	26	(Italy) Ivan Goi	Aprilia	22	+1.737	9	5
12	21	(France) Arnaud Vincent	Aprilia	22	+2.063	16	4
13	5	(Japan) Masaki Tokudome	Aprilia	22	+2.607	8	3
14	7	(Spain) Emilio Alzamora	Aprilia	22	+3.046	10	2
15	9	(France) Frédéric Petit	Honda	22	+5.025	18	1
16	22	(Germany) Steve Jenkner	Aprilia	22	+14.377	19	
17	60	(Spain) Fonsi Nieto	Aprilia	22	+14.503	15	
18	29	(Spain) Ángel Nieto, Jr.	Aprilia	22	+16.024	22	
19	39	(Czech Republic) Jaroslav Huleš	Honda	22	+23.779	24	
20	23	(Italy) Gino Borsoi	Aprilia	22	+33.882	17	
21	19	(Italy) Andrea Ballerini	Yamaha	22	+33.932	25	
22	79	(Spain) Pablo Nieto	Aprilia	22	+37.248	26	
23	71	(Spain) Josep Sardá	Honda	22	+47.529	29	
24	65	(Italy) Andrea Iommi	Honda	22	+47.597	23	
25	58	(Spain) Álvaro Molina	Honda	22	+47.856	21	
Ret	17	(Spain) Enrique Maturana	Yamaha	20	Retirement	20	
Ret	41	(Japan) Youichi Ui	Yamaha	15	Accident	5	
Ret	73	(Spain) Iván Martínez	Aprilia	13	Retirement	27	
Ret	70	(Spain) Adrián Araujo	Honda	1	Accident	28	
DNS	14	(Italy) Federico Cerroni	Aprilia		Did not start		

== Championship standings after the race (500cc) ==
Below are the standings for the top five riders and constructors after round twelve has concluded.

Riders' Championship standings

Pos.	Rider	Points
1	(Australia) Mick Doohan	210
2	(Italy) Max Biaggi	189
3	(Spain) Àlex Crivillé	182
4	(Spain) Carlos Checa	131
5	(Brazil) Alex Barros	109

Constructors' Championship standings

Pos.	Constructor	Points
1	(Japan) Honda	295
2	(Japan) Yamaha	165
3	(Japan) Suzuki	97
4	(Malaysia) Modenas KR3	62
5	(Germany) MuZ	11

- Note: Only the top five positions are included for both sets of standings.

Previous race: 1998 City of Imola Grand Prix	FIM Grand Prix World Championship; 1998 season	Next race: 1998 Australian Grand Prix
Previous race: 1997 Catalan Grand Prix	Catalan Grand Prix	Next race: 1999 Catalan Grand Prix
