= 1998 City of Imola motorcycle Grand Prix =

(Bologna) 1998 City of Imola Grand Prix
Race details
- Race 11 of 14 races in the 1998 Grand Prix motorcycle racing season
- Date: 6 September 1998
- Official name: Gran Premio Cirio Città di Imola
- Location: Autodromo Enzo e Dino Ferrari, Imola
- Course: Permanent racing facility; 4.930 km (3.063 mi)

500cc
Pole position
- Rider: (France) Jean-Michel Bayle
- Time: 1:49.345
Fastest lap
- Rider: (Italy) Max Biaggi
- Time: 1:49.556 on lap 22
Podium
- First: (Australia) Mick Doohan
- Second: (Spain) Àlex Crivillé
- Third: (Italy) Max Biaggi

250cc
Pole position
- Rider: (Japan) Tetsuya Harada
- Time: 1:53.560
Fastest lap
- Rider: (Japan) Tetsuya Harada
- Time: 1:52.533 on lap 21
Podium
- First: (Italy) Valentino Rossi
- Second: (Italy) Loris Capirossi
- Third: (Italy) Stefano Perugini

125cc
Pole position
- Rider: (Italy) Marco Melandri
- Time: 1:59.795
Fastest lap
- Rider: (Japan) Tomomi Manako
- Time: 1:58.880 on lap 15
Podium
- First: (Japan) Tomomi Manako
- Second: (Italy) Marco Melandri
- Third: (Japan) Masao Azuma

The 1998 City of Imola motorcycle Grand Prix was the eleventh round of the 1998 Grand Prix motorcycle racing season. It took place on 6 September 1998 at Imola.

== 500 cc classification ==
Pos.	No.	Rider	Team	Manufacturer	Laps	Time/Retired	Grid	Points
1	1	(Australia) Mick Doohan	Repsol Honda	Honda	25	46:00.092	3	25
2	4	(Spain) Àlex Crivillé	Repsol Honda	Honda	25	+6.564	6	20
3	6	(Italy) Max Biaggi	Marlboro Team Kanemoto	Honda	25	+8.721	4	16
4	9	(Brazil) Alex Barros	Honda Gresini	Honda	25	+11.244	2	13
5	12	(France) Jean-Michel Bayle	Yamaha Team Rainey	Yamaha	25	+21.672	1	11
6	5	(Japan) Norick Abe	Yamaha Team Rainey	Yamaha	25	+28.407	5	10
7	2	(Japan) Tadayuki Okada	Repsol Honda	Honda	25	+36.627	9	9
8	15	(Spain) Sete Gibernau	Repsol Honda	Honda	25	+36.876	13	8
9	3	(Japan) Nobuatsu Aoki	Suzuki Grand Prix Team	Suzuki	25	+37.332	11	7
10	8	(Spain) Carlos Checa	Movistar Honda Pons	Honda	25	+47.677	12	6
11	11	(New Zealand) Simon Crafar	Red Bull Yamaha WCM	Yamaha	25	+55.890	15	5
12	55	(France) Régis Laconi	Red Bull Yamaha WCM	Yamaha	25	+57.040	7	4
13	19	(United States) John Kocinski	Movistar Honda Pons	Honda	25	+58.878	8	3
14	10	(United States) Kenny Roberts Jr.	Team Roberts	Modenas KR3	25	+1:06.104	10	2
15	28	(Germany) Ralf Waldmann	Marlboro Team Roberts	Modenas KR3	25	+1:18.308	16	1
16	27	(Japan) Katsuaki Fujiwara	Suzuki Grand Prix Team	Suzuki	25	+1:19.432	19	
17	14	(Spain) Juan Borja	Shell Advance Racing	Honda	25	+1:28.491	18	
18	23	(United States) Matt Wait	FCC TSR	Honda	25	+1:50.817	20	
19	57	(Italy) Fabio Carpani	Team Polini Inoxmacel	Honda	24	+1 lap	23	
Ret	77	(Switzerland) Eskil Suter	MuZ Roc RennSport	MuZ	18	Retirement	14	
Ret	26	(France) Bernard Garcia	Shell Advance Racing	Honda	16	Retirement	22	
Ret	22	(France) Sébastien Gimbert	Tecmas Honda Elf	Honda	15	Retirement	21	
Ret	17	(Netherlands) Jurgen van den Goorbergh	Dee Cee Jeans Racing Team	Honda	12	Retirement	17	
Ret	88	(United Kingdom) Scott Smart	Team Millar Honda Britain	Honda	12	Retirement	24	
Ret	43	(Italy) Paolo Tessari	Team Paton	Paton	7	Retirement	25	

== 250 cc classification ==
Pos.	No.	Rider	Manufacturer	Laps	Time/Retired	Grid	Points
1	46	(Italy) Valentino Rossi	Aprilia	23	43:43.815	5	25
2	65	(Italy) Loris Capirossi	Aprilia	23	+2.687	3	20
3	4	(Italy) Stefano Perugini	Honda	23	+4.175	6	16
4	5	(Japan) Tohru Ukawa	Honda	23	+6.524	4	13
5	19	(France) Olivier Jacque	Honda	23	+29.180	2	11
6	6	(Japan) Haruchika Aoki	Honda	23	+31.615	11	10
7	37	(Italy) Luca Boscoscuro	TSR-Honda	23	+32.948	15	9
8	44	(Italy) Roberto Rolfo	TSR-Honda	23	+33.614	10	8
9	7	(Japan) Takeshi Tsujimura	Yamaha	23	+35.892	7	7
10	31	(Japan) Tetsuya Harada	Aprilia	23	+39.595	1	6
11	8	(Spain) Luis d'Antin	Yamaha	23	+53.590	14	5
12	17	(Spain) José Luis Cardoso	Yamaha	23	+53.988	19	4
13	21	(Italy) Franco Battaini	Yamaha	23	+54.686	20	3
14	12	(Japan) Noriyasu Numata	Suzuki	23	+56.383	12	2
15	24	(United Kingdom) Jason Vincent	TSR-Honda	23	+1:00.924	13	1
16	14	(Italy) Davide Bulega	ERP Honda	23	+1:13.181	16	
17	45	(Italy) Diego Giugovaz	Aprilia	23	+1:16.205	21	
18	18	(Japan) Osamu Miyazaki	Yamaha	23	+1:25.369	17	
19	48	(Italy) Igor Antonelli	Aprilia	23	+1:29.514	22	
20	25	(Japan) Yasumasa Hatakeyama	Honda	23	+1:33.769	24	
21	16	(Sweden) Johan Stigefelt	Suzuki	23	+1:35.296	23	
22	22	(France) Matthieu Lagrive	Honda	23	+1:38.260	25	
23	49	(Italy) Filippo Cotti	Honda	23	+1:42.065	26	
24	41	(Argentina) Federico Gartner	Aprilia	22	+1 lap	27	
Ret	9	(United Kingdom) Jeremy McWilliams	TSR-Honda	6	Accident	9	
Ret	34	(Italy) Marcellino Lucchi	Aprilia	1	Accident	8	
Ret	27	(Argentina) Sebastián Porto	Aprilia	0	Retirement	18	

== 125 cc classification ==
Pos.	No.	Rider	Manufacturer	Laps	Time/Retired	Grid	Points
1	3	(Japan) Tomomi Manako	Honda	21	42:05.831	2	25
2	13	(Italy) Marco Melandri	Honda	21	+0.087	1	20
3	20	(Japan) Masao Azuma	Honda	21	+10.394	8	16
4	4	(Japan) Kazuto Sakata	Aprilia	21	+10.466	7	13
5	5	(Japan) Masaki Tokudome	Aprilia	21	+22.699	4	11
6	41	(Japan) Youichi Ui	Yamaha	21	+26.133	22	10
7	15	(Italy) Roberto Locatelli	Honda	21	+26.546	3	9
8	62	(Japan) Yoshiaki Katoh	Yamaha	21	+28.161	12	8
9	21	(France) Arnaud Vincent	Aprilia	21	+30.584	23	7
10	26	(Italy) Ivan Goi	Aprilia	21	+48.516	14	6
11	9	(France) Frédéric Petit	Honda	21	+48.656	17	5
12	8	(Italy) Gianluigi Scalvini	Honda	21	+1:02.010	10	4
13	7	(Spain) Emilio Alzamora	Aprilia	21	+1:12.085	13	3
14	22	(Germany) Steve Jenkner	Aprilia	21	+1:12.337	11	2
15	49	(Italy) Andrea Zappa	Honda	21	+1:12.408	18	1
16	17	(Spain) Enrique Maturana	Yamaha	21	+1:13.006	25	
17	48	(Italy) Max Sabbatani	Honda	21	+1:15.643	21	
18	14	(Italy) Federico Cerroni	Aprilia	21	+1:24.081	20	
19	65	(Italy) Andrea Iommi	Honda	21	+1:33.199	24	
Ret	32	(Italy) Mirko Giansanti	Honda	17	Accident	6	
Ret	29	(Spain) Ángel Nieto, Jr.	Aprilia	16	Retirement	19	
Ret	63	(Switzerland) Marco Tresoldi	Honda	14	Accident	27	
Ret	23	(Italy) Gino Borsoi	Aprilia	14	Accident	9	
Ret	59	(Spain) Jerónimo Vidal	Aprilia	10	Retirement	26	
Ret	10	(Italy) Lucio Cecchinello	Honda	4	Accident	5	
Ret	47	(Italy) Riccardo Chiarello	Aprilia	2	Retirement	16	
Ret	39	(Czech Republic) Jaroslav Huleš	Honda	0	Retirement	15	
DNS	52	(Japan) Hiroyuki Kikuchi	Honda		Did not start		
DNS	55	(San Marino) Manuel Poggiali	Honda		Did not start		
DNS	16	(Italy) Christian Manna	Yamaha		Did not start		

== Championship standings after the race (500cc) ==
Below are the standings for the top five riders and constructors after round eleven has concluded.

Riders' Championship standings

Pos.	Rider	Points
1	(Italy) Max Biaggi	189
2	(Australia) Mick Doohan	185
3	(Spain) Àlex Crivillé	182
4	(Spain) Carlos Checa	121
5	(Brazil) Alex Barros	100

Constructors' Championship standings

Pos.	Constructor	Points
1	(Japan) Honda	270
2	(Japan) Yamaha	149
3	(Japan) Suzuki	92
4	(Malaysia) Modenas KR3	56
5	(Germany) MuZ	11

- Note: Only the top five positions are included for both sets of standings.

Previous race: 1998 Czech Republic Grand Prix	FIM Grand Prix World Championship; 1998 season	Next race: 1998 Catalan Grand Prix
Previous race: 1997 Imola Grand Prix	Imola Grand Prix	Next race: 1999 Imola Grand Prix
