= 1998 Australian motorcycle Grand Prix =

(Australia) 1998 Australian Grand Prix
Race details
- Race 13 of 14 races in the 1998 Grand Prix motorcycle racing season
- Date: 4 October 1998
- Official name: Qantas Australian Grand Prix
- Location: Phillip Island Grand Prix Circuit
- Course: Permanent racing facility; 4.448 km (2.764 mi)

500cc
Pole position
- Rider: (Australia) Mick Doohan
- Time: 1:33.162
Fastest lap
- Rider: (New Zealand) Simon Crafar
- Time: 1:33.868 on lap 11
Podium
- First: (Australia) Mick Doohan
- Second: (New Zealand) Simon Crafar
- Third: (Spain) Àlex Crivillé

250cc
Pole position
- Rider: (Italy) Loris Capirossi
- Time: 1:35.025
Fastest lap
- Rider: (Japan) Tetsuya Harada
- Time: 1:35.253 on lap 7
Podium
- First: (Italy) Valentino Rossi
- Second: (Italy) Loris Capirossi
- Third: (France) Olivier Jacque

125cc
Pole position
- Rider: (Italy) Marco Melandri
- Time: 1:40.490
Fastest lap
- Rider: (Italy) Marco Melandri
- Time: 1:40.296 on lap 23
Podium
- First: (Japan) Masao Azuma
- Second: (Japan) Tomomi Manako
- Third: (Italy) Marco Melandri

The 1998 Australian motorcycle Grand Prix was the thirteenth round of the 1998 Grand Prix motorcycle racing season. It took place on 4 October 1998 at the Phillip Island Grand Prix Circuit.

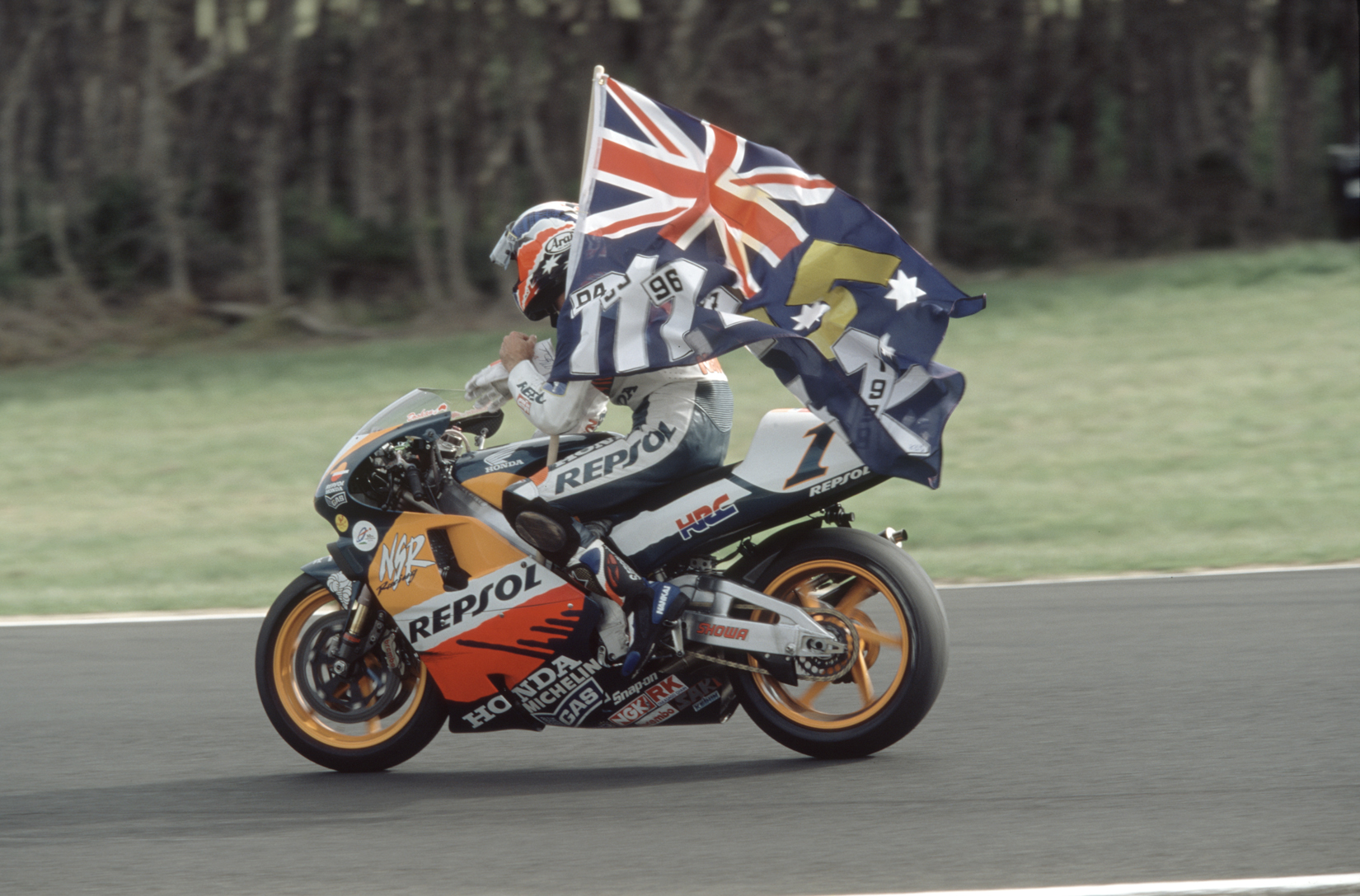
Mick Doohan, clinching his fifth and final 500cc title after winning the race.

== 500 cc classification ==
Pos.	No.	Rider	Team	Manufacturer	Laps	Time/Retired	Grid	Points
1	1	(Australia) Mick Doohan	Repsol Honda	Honda	27	42:42.511	1	25
2	11	(New Zealand) Simon Crafar	Red Bull Yamaha WCM	Yamaha	27	+0.818	4	20
3	4	(Spain) Àlex Crivillé	Repsol Honda	Honda	27	+2.684	7	16
4	9	(Brazil) Alex Barros	Honda Gresini	Honda	27	+2.727	5	13
5	5	(Japan) Norick Abe	Yamaha Team Rainey	Yamaha	27	+9.060	9	11
6	3	(Japan) Nobuatsu Aoki	Suzuki Grand Prix Team	Suzuki	27	+12.961	11	10
7	55	(France) Régis Laconi	Red Bull Yamaha WCM	Yamaha	27	+13.056	8	9
8	6	(Italy) Max Biaggi	Marlboro Team Kanemoto	Honda	27	+14.111	2	8
9	2	(Japan) Tadayuki Okada	Repsol Honda	Honda	27	+36.458	6	7
10	10	(United States) Kenny Roberts Jr.	Team Roberts	Modenas KR3	27	+43.354	12	6
11	17	(Netherlands) Jurgen van den Goorbergh	Dee Cee Jeans Racing Team	Honda	27	+1:00.551	15	5
12	19	(United States) John Kocinski	Movistar Honda Pons	Honda	27	+1:05.755	3	4
13	23	(United States) Matt Wait	FCC TSR	Honda	27	+1:07.659	17	3
14	33	(Australia) Mark Willis	Suzuki Grand Prix Team	Suzuki	27	+1:10.720	14	2
15	88	(United Kingdom) Scott Smart	Team Millar Honda Britain	Honda	27	+1:30.432	19	1
16	14	(Spain) Juan Borja	Shell Advance Racing	Honda	26	+1 lap	18	
Ret	22	(France) Sébastien Gimbert	Tecmas Honda Elf	Honda	20	Retirement	20	
Ret	57	(Italy) Fabio Carpani	Team Polini Inoxmacel	Honda	13	Retirement	22	
Ret	42	(Australia) Craig Connell	Shell Advance Racing	Honda	7	Retirement	16	
Ret	28	(Germany) Ralf Waldmann	Marlboro Team Roberts	Modenas KR3	6	Accident	10	
Ret	18	(Australia) Garry McCoy	Shell Advance Racing	Honda	4	Retirement	21	
Ret	15	(Spain) Sete Gibernau	Repsol Honda	Honda	2	Accident	13	
DNS	8	(Spain) Carlos Checa	Movistar Honda Pons	Honda		Did not start		

== 250 cc classification ==
Pos.	No.	Rider	Manufacturer	Laps	Time/Retired	Grid	Points
1	46	(Italy) Valentino Rossi	Aprilia	25	40:06.135	2	25
2	65	(Italy) Loris Capirossi	Aprilia	25	+1.339	1	20
3	19	(France) Olivier Jacque	Honda	25	+1.421	6	16
4	50	(Japan) Shinya Nakano	Yamaha	25	+8.461	3	13
5	5	(Japan) Tohru Ukawa	Honda	25	+30.795	7	11
6	4	(Italy) Stefano Perugini	Honda	25	+31.875	8	10
7	8	(Spain) Luis d'Antin	Yamaha	25	+42.304	11	9
8	6	(Japan) Haruchika Aoki	Honda	25	+42.740	5	8
9	12	(Japan) Noriyasu Numata	Suzuki	25	+42.773	15	7
10	37	(Italy) Luca Boscoscuro	TSR-Honda	25	+45.696	13	6
11	16	(Sweden) Johan Stigefelt	Suzuki	25	+47.850	16	5
12	7	(Japan) Takeshi Tsujimura	Yamaha	25	+48.121	18	4
13	44	(Italy) Roberto Rolfo	TSR-Honda	25	+1:16.123	21	3
14	25	(Japan) Yasumasa Hatakeyama	Honda	25	+1:16.438	17	2
15	18	(Japan) Osamu Miyazaki	Yamaha	25	+1:16.524	20	1
16	64	(Australia) Shaun Geronimi	Yamaha	24	+1 lap	23	
17	43	(Australia) David Horton	Honda	24	+1 lap	25	
18	22	(France) Matthieu Lagrive	Honda	24	+1 lap	26	
19	41	(Argentina) Federico Gartner	Aprilia	24	+1 lap	24	
20	63	(New Zealand) Craig Frederickson	Honda	24	+1 lap	28	
Ret	24	(United Kingdom) Jason Vincent	TSR-Honda	18	Accident	19	
Ret	9	(United Kingdom) Jeremy McWilliams	TSR-Honda	16	Accident	14	
Ret	21	(Italy) Franco Battaini	Yamaha	16	Accident	10	
Ret	27	(Argentina) Sebastián Porto	Aprilia	16	Retirement	9	
Ret	42	(Australia) William Strugnell	Yamaha	15	Retirement	27	
Ret	31	(Japan) Tetsuya Harada	Aprilia	14	Accident	4	
Ret	17	(Spain) José Luis Cardoso	Yamaha	9	Retirement	12	
Ret	14	(Italy) Davide Bulega	ERP Honda	9	Retirement	22	
DNS	15	(Australia) Martin Craggill	Aprilia		Did not start		
DNQ	62	(Australia) Adam Brunskill	Yamaha		Did not qualify		

== 125 cc classification ==
Pos.	No.	Rider	Manufacturer	Laps	Time/Retired	Grid	Points
1	20	(Japan) Masao Azuma	Honda	23	38:56.336	4	25
2	3	(Japan) Tomomi Manako	Honda	23	+0.025	2	20
3	13	(Italy) Marco Melandri	Honda	23	+0.044	1	16
4	4	(Japan) Kazuto Sakata	Aprilia	23	+2.403	3	13
5	41	(Japan) Youichi Ui	Yamaha	23	+2.847	5	11
6	15	(Italy) Roberto Locatelli	Honda	23	+4.683	17	10
7	10	(Italy) Lucio Cecchinello	Honda	23	+5.204	12	9
8	39	(Czech Republic) Jaroslav Huleš	Honda	23	+12.758	9	8
9	8	(Italy) Gianluigi Scalvini	Honda	23	+15.711	10	7
10	23	(Italy) Gino Borsoi	Aprilia	23	+22.620	19	6
11	26	(Italy) Ivan Goi	Aprilia	23	+24.381	18	5
12	32	(Italy) Mirko Giansanti	Honda	23	+24.415	6	4
13	29	(Spain) Ángel Nieto, Jr.	Aprilia	23	+24.795	20	3
14	9	(France) Frédéric Petit	Honda	23	+25.156	13	2
15	22	(Germany) Steve Jenkner	Aprilia	23	+25.254	21	1
16	5	(Japan) Masaki Tokudome	Aprilia	23	+28.938	16	
17	17	(Spain) Enrique Maturana	Yamaha	23	+41.540	23	
18	2	(Japan) Noboru Ueda	Honda	23	+41.615	11	
19	19	(Italy) Andrea Ballerini	Yamaha	23	+42.645	14	
20	45	(Australia) Jay Taylor	Honda	23	+54.654	24	
21	7	(Spain) Emilio Alzamora	Aprilia	23	+1:01.832	22	
22	65	(Italy) Andrea Iommi	Honda	23	+1:05.886	25	
23	43	(Australia) Peter Galvin	Honda	23	+1:18.589	27	
Ret	44	(Australia) Judd Greedy	Honda	22	Retirement	29	
Ret	46	(Australia) Anthony West	Honda	12	Accident	26	
Ret	59	(Spain) Jerónimo Vidal	Aprilia	12	Accident	15	
Ret	21	(France) Arnaud Vincent	Aprilia	12	Retirement	8	
Ret	62	(Japan) Yoshiaki Katoh	Yamaha	2	Accident	7	
Ret	24	(Italy) Alessandro Romagnoli	Aprilia	2	Retirement	28	
DNS	42	(Australia) Chedryian Bresland	Honda		Did not start		

== Championship standings after the race (500cc) ==
Below are the standings for the top five riders and constructors after round thirteen has concluded.

Riders' Championship standings

Pos.	Rider	Points
1	(Australia) Mick Doohan	235
2	(Spain) Àlex Crivillé	198
3	(Italy) Max Biaggi	197
4	(Spain) Carlos Checa	131
5	(Brazil) Alex Barros	122

Constructors' Championship standings

Pos.	Constructor	Points
1	(Japan) Honda	320
2	(Japan) Yamaha	185
3	(Japan) Suzuki	107
4	(Malaysia) Modenas KR3	68
5	(Germany) MuZ	11

- Note: Only the top five positions are included for both sets of standings.

Previous race: 1998 Catalan Grand Prix	FIM Grand Prix World Championship; 1998 season	Next race: 1998 Argentine Grand Prix
Previous race: 1997 Australian Grand Prix	Australian motorcycle Grand Prix	Next race: 1999 Australian Grand Prix
