= Simon Crafar =

New Zealand former motorcycle racer

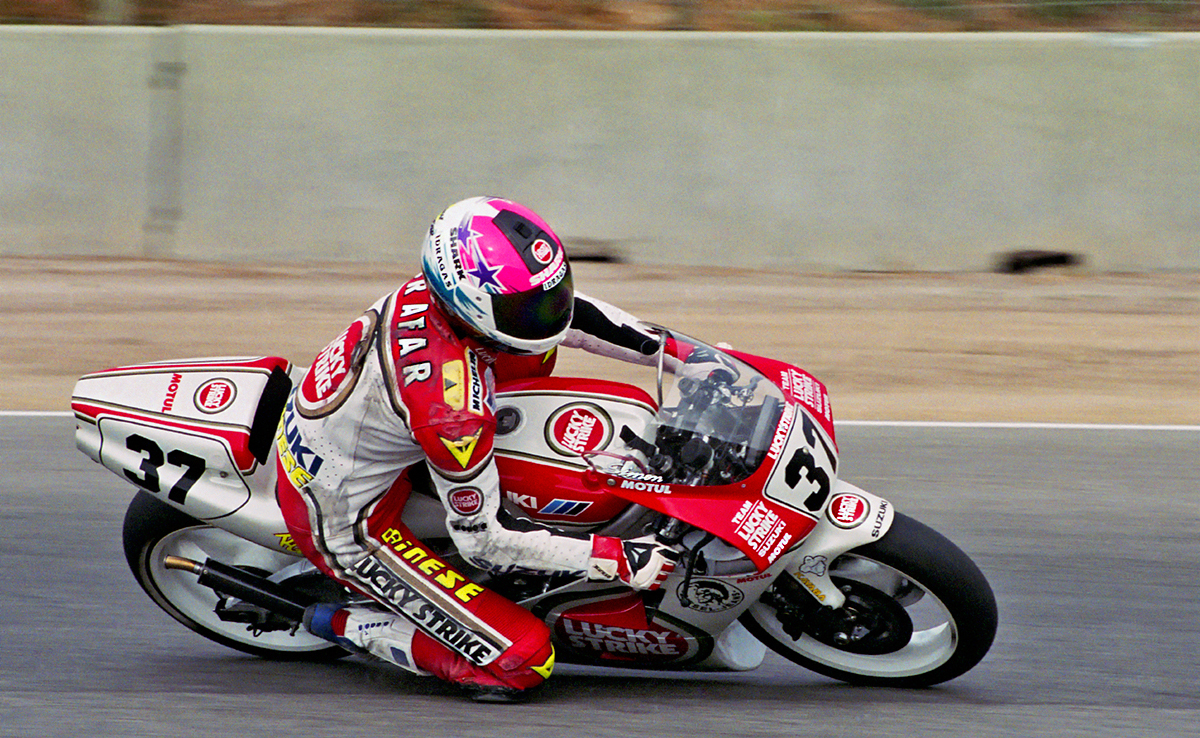
- Simon Crafar at the 1993 U.S. Grand Prix
- Born: 15 January 1969 (age 57); Waiouru, New Zealand
Motorcycle racing career statistics
Grand Prix motorcycle racing
Active years	1993, 1998-1999
First race	1993 500cc Spanish Grand Prix
Last race	1999 500cc British Grand Prix
First win	1998 500cc British Grand Prix
Last win	1998 500cc British Grand Prix
Team(s)	Suzuki, Yamaha
Starts / Wins / Podiums / Poles / F. laps / Points; 32 / 1 / 3 / 1 / 2 / 162
Superbike World Championship
Active years	1989 - 1997, 2000
Manufacturers	Honda, Kawasaki
Starts / Wins / Podiums / Poles / F. laps / Points; 122 / 0 / 10 / 1 / 2 / 844

Simon Crafar (born 15 January 1969) is a New Zealand retired motorcycle racer who competed at the Grand Prix motorcycle racing and World Superbike levels.

After riding, Crafer worked as a television commentator and analyst and participated in rider safety. From the 2025 season, he would join the world championship race organisers as Chairman of the FIM MotoGP Stewards' Panel, overseeing two other Stewards and replacing outgoing Freddie Spencer.

Crafer's racing career started in 1981 aboard a Suzuki TM75 in a local Junior Motocross Championship before eventually moving onto road racing in 1985. He won Malaysia's Superbike championship in 1991. In 1993 he raced a Harris machine in the 500 cc World Championship before joining the Suzuki factory racing team in the 250 class for the latter part of the season. He did not enjoy this, feeling he was too large for the bikes.

== World Superbike ==
For 1994, Crafer joined countryman Aaron Slight on a semi-works Rumi Honda RC45 in the Superbike World Championship. After coming fifth overall in 1994, he started the 1995 season with Rumi Honda before replacing Doug Polen as the second factory rider alongside Aaron Slight, although they raced under different liveries. The bike gradually became more competitive, and Simon was strong in later part of 1995, coming 2nd in race 1 at Assen. He then spent two years with the Kawasaki racing team, scoring only one podium during the 1996 season finishing in seventh position. In 1997, he took two second places and five third places in addition to one pole position and fastest lap to again finish fifth overall. In total, he scored ten podiums - four seconds and six thirds but, no wins in the series.

Crafer returned to World Superbike for 2000 as a substitute rider for Aaron Slight for two rounds. In 2002, he raced in British Superbike for the Virgin Mobile Yamaha team, coming eighth overall with two third place finishes. He retired from motorcycle racing at the end of the 2002 season to spend more time with his wife and children and continues to live in Andorra to this date.

== 500 GP ==
In 1998, Crafar rode a WCM Yamaha YZR500 in the 500cc world championship, winning the British Grand Prix at Donington Park (the last win for Dunlop in a dry race and the only non Honda win during the 1998 season and at Donington Park in six years), and finishing seventh in the standings, scoring two further podiums - one second and one third during the season with two fastest race laps - Donington Park and Phillip Island. He remained with the team for the early part of 1999, scoring points on five occasions. The WCM team changed to Michelin between seasons and Crafar found he could not replicate the same level of success as he had the previous year on Dunlop tyres and they parted company midway through the 1999 season. Crafar also took tenth on a one off ride on an MuZ at Donington Park during the same year. In total, he has contested 25 500cc races and seven 250cc races, taking three podium finishes.

== Extreme Enduro ==
Following his retirement from road racing, Crafar continued to enjoy Extreme Enduro competing in the Red Bull Romaniacs competition held in Romania winning the Expert Class during 2007. During 2008 and 2009, Crafar worked with the organisers of the Red Bull Romaniacs competition assisting in the design and mapping of the course sections. During 2009, he was involved in a serious accident with a car whilst planning for the 2009 event that resulted in a broken back. Crafar underwent a successful operation to insert a metal plate and screws into his back.

== On Circuit Instruction ==
Since 2006, Crafar has been involved in on-circuit rider instruction for both track day riders and professional racers and has personally taught over 600 people on a one-to-one basis in a little over six years. Utilising his experience from competing and racing in World Championships throughout a 13 year career, Crafar uses simple, logical techniques that are very effective in allowing riders to improve their lap times in a safe and controlled manner. It was this approach to instruction that lead the organisers of the European Junior Cup a race series held at the WSBK championship rounds across Europe for 14- to 19-year-old riders) to approach Crafar to become the mentor and series instructor to the young racers aged 14–19 for the 2011 Championship, a position he held for the 2012 Championship. Crafar is involved in one-to-one rider instruction throughout Europe.

== Motovudu Dark Art of Performance ==
During the latter part of 2011, Crafar launched Motovudu - Dark Art of Performance, a book and DVD series that is an instructional guide to riding faster on-circuit. Filmed at the MotoGP circuit Motorland Aragon in Northern Spain by Banter Media and directed by Liam Andrew Wright, both the book and the film draw from Crafar's previous experiences, both racing and instructional and is designed to teach any rider how they can ride fast and stay away from unnecessary risks.

== MotoGP Commentator ==
In 2018, Crafar took on the new role of pitlane reporter for Dorna covering all the races for MotoGP, Moto2 and Moto3 going out on the world feed. He also does an onboard lap before each race discussing each circuit. In 2019, he joined Neil Morrison and Matt Dunn as a commentator on the Moto2 and Moto3 practice and qualifying sessions.

== Career statistics ==
=== Grand Prix motorcycle racing ===
==== By season ====
Season	Class	Team	Motorcycle	Number	Race	Win	Podium	Pole	FLap	Pts	Plcd
1993	500cc	Peter Graves Racing Team	Harris-Yamaha SLS500	37	5	0	0	0	0	7	27th
1993	250cc	Team Lucky Strike Suzuki 250	Suzuki RGV250	74	7	0	0	0	0	17	21st
1998	500cc	Red Bull Yamaha WCM	Yamaha YZR500	11	14	1	3	1	2	119	7th
1999	500cc	Red Bull Yamaha WCM	Yamaha YZR500	11	5	0	0	0	0	19	18th
1999	500cc	Team Biland GP1	MuZ Weber 500	11	1	0	0	0	0	19	18th
Total					**32**	**1**	**3**	**1**	**2**	**162**	

==== By class ====
Class	Seasons	1st GP	1st Pod	1st Win	Race	Win	Podium	Pole	FLap	Pts	WChmp
500cc	1993, 1998-1999	1993 Spain	1998 Netherlands	1998 Great Britain	25	1	3	1	2	145	0
250cc	1993	1993 Catalunya			7	0	0	0	0	17	0
Total	**1993, 1998-1999**				**32**	**1**	**3**	**1**	**2**	**162**	**0**

==== Races by year ====
(key) (Races in bold indicate pole position, races in italics indicate fastest lap)

Year	Class	Manufacturer	1	2	3	4	5	6	7	8	9	10	11	12	13	14	15	16	Pos	Pts
1993	500cc	Yamaha				ESP; Ret	AUT; 18	GER; Ret	NED; 9	EUR; Ret									27th	7
1993	250cc	Suzuki								EUR; 10	SMR; 13	GBR; Ret	CZE; 13	ITA; 11	USA; Ret	FIM; Ret			21st	17
1998	500cc	Yamaha	JPN; 9	MAL; Ret	ESP; 13	ITA; 7	FRA; 9	MAD; 8	NED; 3	**GBR**; 1	GER; Ret	CZE; 11	IMO; 11	CAT; 5	AUS; 2	ARG; 13			7th	119
1999	500cc	Yamaha	MAL; 14	JPN; Ret	ESP; 14	FRA; 11	ITA; 12	CAT; WD											18th	19
1999	500cc	MuZ Weber								GBR; 10									18th	19
