= Marco Melandri =

Italian motorcycle racer (born 1982)

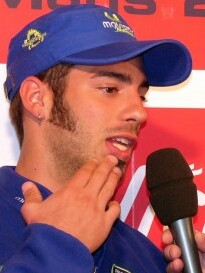
- Melandri at the 2005 French motorcycle Grand Prix
- Nationality: Italian
- Born: 7 August 1982 (age 44); Ravenna, Italy
Motorcycle racing career statistics
MotoGP World Championship
Active years	2003–2010, 2015
Manufacturers	Yamaha (2003–2004); Honda (2005–2007, 2010); Ducati (2008); Kawasaki (2009); Aprilia (2015)
Championships	0
2015 championship position	NC (0 pts)
Starts / Wins / Podiums / Poles / F. laps / Points; 139 / 5 / 20 / 0 / 3 / 1017
250cc World Championship
Active years	2000–2002
Manufacturers	Aprilia
Championships	1 (2002)
2002 championship position	1st (298 pts)
Starts / Wins / Podiums / Poles / F. laps / Points; 47 / 10 / 25 / 3 / 8 / 651
125cc World Championship
Active years	1997–1999
Manufacturers	Honda
Championships	0
1999 championship position	2nd (226 pts)
Starts / Wins / Podiums / Poles / F. laps / Points; 29 / 7 / 17 / 6 / 5 / 428
Superbike World Championship
Active years	2011–2014, 2017–2019
Manufacturers	BMW, Yamaha, Aprilia, Ducati
Championships	0
2018 championship position	5th (297 pts)
Starts / Wins / Podiums / Poles / F. laps / Points; 201 / 22 / 75 / 4 / 21 / 2039.5

Marco Melandri (born 7 August 1982) is an Italian former motorcycle road racer who is a five-time premier class race winner. He is the 2002 250 cc World Champion and runner-up in 125 cc, MotoGP and Superbike World Championship. He competed in the MotoGP class from 2003 to 2010 and then a brief return with Aprilia in 2015.

Melandri's best years in MotoGP came in 2005 and 2006 with these two seasons being the only seasons he won races in MotoGP, the same as title rival Nicky Hayden. Melandri finished runner-up in 2005 to Valentino Rossi with two wins. The 2006 season is regarded as his best ever as he won three races and finished 24 points behind eventual champion Nicky Hayden. In both these seasons, he won more races than title rival Hayden, finishing ahead of Hayden in 2005 and just behind him in 2006. Melandri has 22 race wins in Grand Prix motorcycle racing including five in MotoGP.

Melandri switched to the Superbike World Championship in 2011, earning 22 wins in his first six seasons finishing among the top five every time. Melandri retired from racing after the 2019 Superbike World Championship. After a brief return to Superbike in 2020 and racing in four rounds, Melandri retired again.

== Career ==
=== Early career ===
Melandri was born in Ravenna. He was introduced to racing by a former rider Loris Reggiani at the age of six. He came through the ranks from minibikes, motocross and then the Italian and European 125cc championship.

In 1997, Melandri won the Italian 125cc championship, also finishing fourth in European 125cc championship. In addition to his European success, he made his debut in 125cc world championship at Brno, Czech Republic as a wild card rider.

=== 125cc World Championship ===
After impressing in Italian and European championship in 1997, Melandri finally got his chance to compete in 1998 125cc world championship as a regular. He rode Honda 125cc bike under Benetton Honda Team. He went on to impress many as he earned his first podium in the fourth race of the season, where he finished second in his home Grand Prix at Mugello, Italy. His brilliant debut season continued when he won his first grand prix at Assen TT, Netherlands. He won this race at the age of 15 years and 324 days which made him the youngest ever Grand Prix winner, at the time. Overall, he won two Grand Prix in his debut season and therefore he finished the season at third position in overall standings behind champion Kazuto Sakata and runner-up Tomomi Manako.

Melandri remained on the same bike and team in 1999, where he bid to win the 125cc world championship. He went on to win five Grand Prix but failed to win the championship, finishing second behind Emilio Alzamora with just a single point difference. Failure in securing his first world championship did not stop his rise to 250cc world championship in 2000.

=== 250cc World Championship ===
Melandri was signed by Aprilia in 2000 to replace another Italian Valentino Rossi who left the team and 250cc class for 500cc class. He was highly expected to take over Rossi's shoes and to win the 250cc world championship. However, his debut season did not start as well as the expectation. He struggled to adapt to bigger bike and higher competition. He failed to win any Grand Prix in 2000, managing only four podiums, all came late in the season. Despite these problems, he still finishes the season at fifth position overall.

In 2001, Melandri's performances were improving. He managed to win his first 250cc Grand Prix at Sachsenring, Germany. However, it was his only win in 2001. Despite managing to appear on the podium on nine occasions, he never really challenged for the championship. He finished the season in third position behind champion Daijiro Kato and runner-up Tetsuya Harada.

2002 proved to be Melandri's chance to shine. With 2001 champion and runner-up, Kato and Harada moved to MotoGP class, he became the strongest contender for the championship. He dominated the season by collecting nine wins and three additional podiums. After challenging for world championship for years, he finally won the 250cc world title. He became the youngest 250cc world champion at the age of 20 years and 74 days until Dani Pedrosa broke his record in 2004.

=== MotoGP World Championship ===
After securing the 250cc world title in 2002, Melandri moved up to MotoGP class to spearhead Yamaha factory team alongside Carlos Checa in 2003 replacing the departing Max Biaggi. The Yamaha was less competitive than Honda and Ducati, and although Melandri at times showed good speed, he struggled to turn this into good results. He finished the season in 15th position without collecting any wins or podiums.

Melandri joined Yamaha's satellite team, Tech3 in 2004 alongside Norick Abe in order to make way for the incoming Valentino Rossi. This season, he again struggled to get top results. Although he managed to collect two consecutive podiums, a series of crashes and retirements kept him out of the top-ten in overall standings. He finished the season in 12th position.

Released from his Yamaha contract after the 2004 season, Melandri was the surprise choice of boss Fausto Gresini to join Sete Gibernau in the Movistar Honda team for the 2005 MotoGP campaign. Melandri was successful with Movistar Honda in 2005, with a consistent run of podium finishes early in the season, ultimately taking his first two wins in the final two races of 2005 to clinch second place in the championship. In doing so, he was the first Honda rider to win back-to-back races for nearly two years, winning the final two rounds of the MotoGP Championship at Istanbul and in Valencia. Although he never really challenged his best friend Valentino Rossi for the title, he finished the season strongly as runner-up, with a total of two wins and five other podiums.

Melandri rode for Gresini's Fortuna Honda team alongside Toni Elías in the 2006 season. With Rossi struggling to find consistency, he was a major challenger, along with Ducati's Loris Capirossi and Honda riders Nicky Hayden and Dani Pedrosa. He again won at Istanbul, despite starting from 14th on the grid. He managed further wins at Le Mans, France and Phillip Island, Australia. He finished the season in fourth position, just one point behind Capirossi.

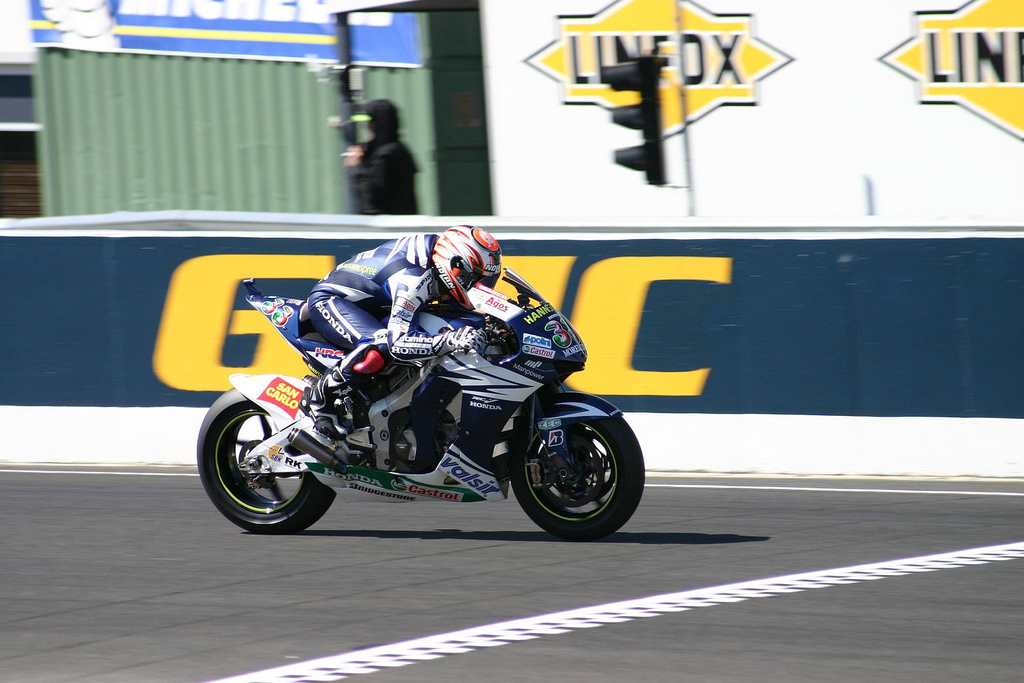
Melandri at the 2007 Australian Grand Prix

In 2007, Melandri and Elias remained in the Honda Gresini team, now sponsored by Hannspree. Honda's 800cc machine was not competitive. Melandri finished on the podium at Mazda Raceway Laguna Seca and Le Mans – at this point he and works rider Dani Pedrosa were the only Honda riders with multiple podiums. He ultimately finished fifth overall, second only to Pedrosa among the Honda riders.

Immediately after Melandri's third-place finish in the 2007 USA's MotoGP round, Ducati announced that he would join its factory team alongside Casey Stoner for 2008 and 2009. But 2008 proved disastrous, with a run of uncompetitive runs often leaving him behind the semi-works Alice Team bikes of Toni Elías and Sylvain Guintoli. At Assen, he qualified last and ran there throughout. A rumoured mid-season move to Kawasaki did not occur, however Melandri announced that he would be joining Kawasaki Racing Team for the 2009 MotoGP season to ride alongside his new teammate John Hopkins on 19 August. He then ended the season in a lacklustre 17th position.

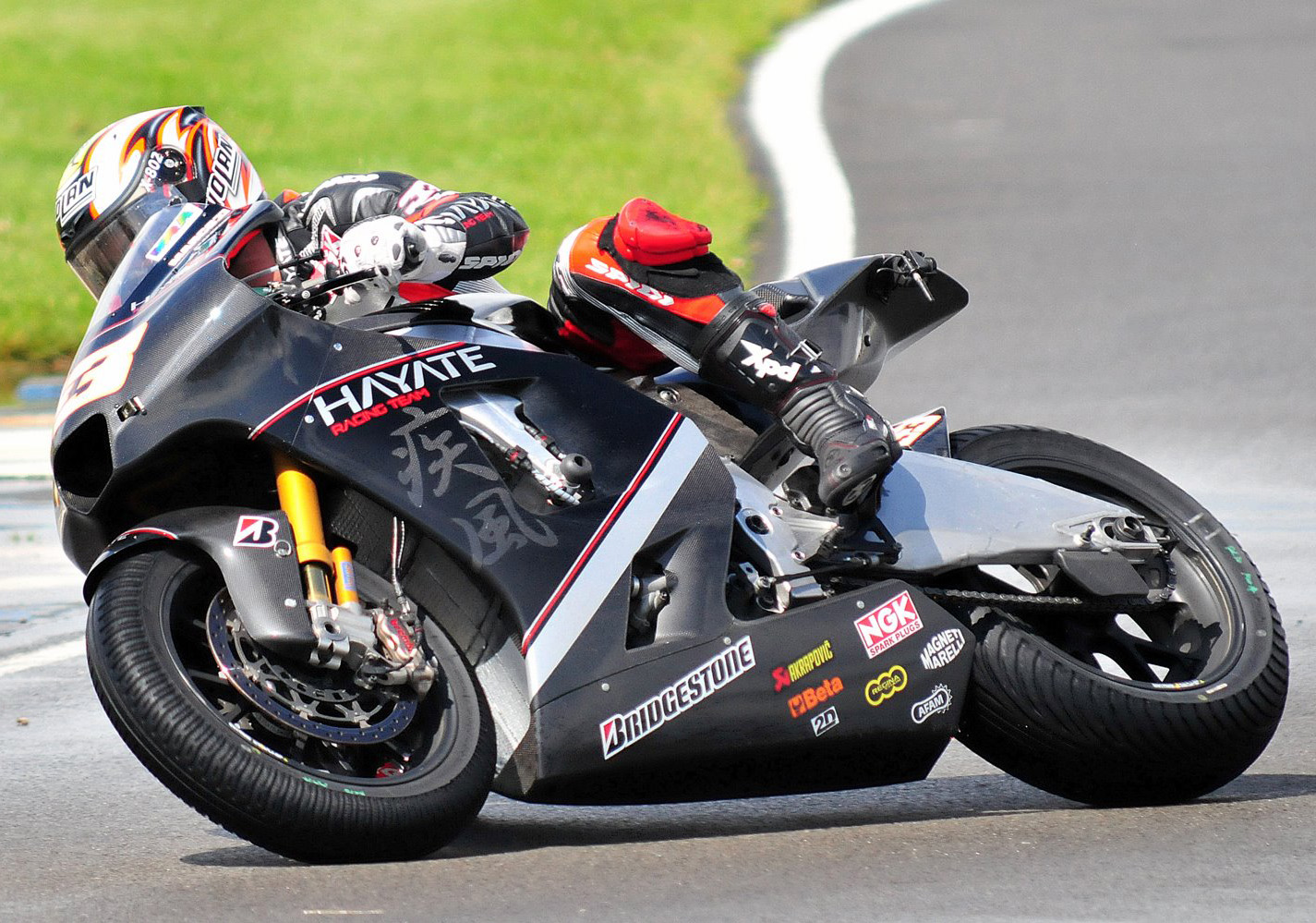
Melandri at the 2009 British Grand Prix.

Kawasaki pulled its factory involvement for 2009, leading to fears that Melandri would not have a ride, however a rescue package was agreed to allow Melandri to run the bike for a one-bike semi-works Hayate Racing team, despite his concerns over the bike's poor rear traction. In 2009, Melandri achieved his first podium since 2007 with his second-place finish at the wet French motorcycle Grand Prix. His only other top-six finishes were in the first three races, as the team tailed off bike development and Melandri finished tenth overall. At Brno, he battled Mika Kallio for sixth before a penultimate-lap collision between the two.

For 2010, Melandri returned to Gresini Honda, with a factory-spec RC212V bike from the start. Full factory support had sometimes been promised, but not provided, during his first Gresini spell. The team made set-up errors in its initial testing.

=== Superbike World Championship ===
Melandri moved to the Superbike World Championship from 2011 with the Yamaha World Superbike Team, replacing Cal Crutchlow, who moved to the Tech3 team in MotoGP.

On 2 October 2011, Melandri signed a contract to ride with the BMW World Superbike team for the 2012 season, after Yamaha elected not to continue with a factory team after the 2011 season. Melandri achieved BMW's best result, at the time, in the Superbike World Championship, with a second place in the season-opening race at Phillip Island, having started 13th on the grid. Mixed results followed at Imola, Assen and Monza, but Melandri achieved BMW's first Superbike World Championship victory at the European round at Donington Park, leading home teammate Leon Haslam in a 1–2 finish. Melandri and Haslam collided in the meeting's second race, denying a weekend sweep for BMW. From that point, Melandri won races at Miller Motorsports Park, Motorland Aragón and a double at Brno, to move within 21 points of the championship lead held by Max Biaggi.

On 16 July 2020, it was announced that Melandri would replace Leon Camier at the Barni Ducati Racing Team for the remainder of the season 2020. Camier was not recovered from a shoulder injury during winter testing at Motorland Aragon after fracturing his shoulder and wrist.

In September 2020, another retirement announcement was made midway through the season, due to Melandri's disappointing results and the hope of the Barni team finding better WSBK success with their younger rider Samuele Cavalieri, promoted from their entry in the Italian national CIV Superstock race class.

=== Return to MotoGP ===
In November 2014, it was announced that Melandri would return to Gresini, Aprilia's factory team for the 2015 season. However, after failing to score a point in the first eight races of the season, Melandri left the team and was replaced by Michael Laverty and then by Stefan Bradl.

=== Car racing ===
In addition to his motorcycle racing career, Melandri has also competed in car racing. He raced in two rounds of the 2008-09 Speedcar Series season, scoring two points from the four races.

== Career statistics ==
=== Grand Prix motorcycle racing ===
==== By season ====
Season	Class	Motorcycle	Team	Race	Win	Podium	Pole	FLap	Pts	Plcd	WCh
1997	125cc	Honda RS125R		1	0	0	0	0	0	NC	–
1998	125cc	Honda RS125R	Benetton Matteoni	14	2	8	3	1	202	3rd	–
1999	125cc	Honda RS125R	Benetton Playlife	14	5	9	3	4	226	2nd	–
2000	250cc	Aprilia RSV250	Blu Aprilia Team	16	0	4	1	0	159	5th	–
2001	250cc	Aprilia RSV250	MS Aprilia Racing	15	1	9	0	4	194	3rd	–
2002	250cc	Aprilia RSV250	MS Aprilia Racing	16	9	12	2	4	298	1st	1
2003	MotoGP	Yamaha YZR-M1	Fortuna Yamaha	13	0	0	0	0	45	15th	–
2004	MotoGP	Yamaha YZR-M1	Fortuna Tech3	15	0	2	0	0	75	12th	–
2005	MotoGP	Honda RC211V	Movistar Honda MotoGP	17	2	7	0	3	220	2nd	–
2006	MotoGP	Honda RC211V	Fortuna Honda Gresini	17	3	7	0	0	228	4th	–
2007	MotoGP	Honda RC212V	Gresini Racing	17	0	3	0	0	187	5th	–
2008	MotoGP	Ducati Desmosedici GP8	Ducati Marlboro	18	0	0	0	0	51	17th	–
2009	MotoGP	Kawasaki Ninja ZX-RR	Hayate Racing Team	17	0	1	0	0	108	10th	–
2010	MotoGP	Honda RC212V	San Carlo Honda Gresini	17	0	0	0	0	103	10th	–
2015	MotoGP	Aprilia RS-GP	Aprilia Racing Team Gresini	8	0	0	0	0	0	NC	–
Total				**215**	**22**	**62**	**9**	**16**	**2096**		**1**

==== By class ====
Class	Seasons	1st GP	1st Pod	1st Win	Race	Win	Podiums	Pole	FLap	Pts	WChmp
125cc	1997–1999	1997 Czech Republic	1998 Italy	1998 Netherlands	29	7	17	6	5	428	0
250cc	2000–2002	2000 South Africa	2000 Portugal	2001 Germany	47	10	25	3	8	651	1
MotoGP	2003–2010, 2015	2003 Japan	2004 Catalunya	2005 Turkey	139	5	20	0	3	1017	0
Total	1997–2010, 2015				**215**	**22**	**62**	**9**	**16**	**2096**	**1**

==== Races by year ====
(key) (Races in bold indicate pole position, races in italics indicate fastest lap)

Year	Class	Bike	1	2	3	4	5	6	7	8	9	10	11	12	13	14	15	16	17	18	Pos.	Pts
1997	125cc	Honda	MAL	JPN	SPA	ITA	AUT	FRA	NED	IMO	GER	BRA	GBR	CZE; 17	CAT	IND	AUS				NC	0
1998	125cc	Honda	JPN; 10	MAL; Ret	SPA; 10	ITA; 2	FRA; 2	MAD; 2	NED; 1	GBR; 4	**GER**; 13	CZE; 1	**IMO**; 2	CAT; 8	**AUS**; 3	ARG; 2					**3rd**	**202**
1999	125cc	Honda	MAL; DNS	JPN	SPA; Ret	FRA; 6	ITA; 2	CAT; 3	NED; 8	GBR; 5	**GER**; 1	CZE; 1	**IMO**; 1	VAL; Ret	AUS; 1	RSA; 3	**BRA**; 2	ARG; 1			**2nd**	**226**
2000	250cc	Aprilia	RSA; 13	MAL; 5	JPN; 5	SPA; 6	FRA; 4	ITA; 4	CAT; 6	NED; Ret	GBR; Ret	GER; Ret	CZE; 4	POR; 3	VAL; 3	**BRA**; 3	PAC; 3	AUS; 5			5th	159
2001	250cc	Aprilia	JPN; 6	RSA; 2	SPA; 3	FRA; 3	ITA; 3	CAT; Ret	NED; 6	GBR; 3	GER; 1	CZE; 2	POR; 2	VAL; Ret	PAC; Ret	AUS; DNS	MAL; 11	BRA; 2			**3rd**	**194**
2002	250cc	Aprilia	JPN; Ret	RSA; 1	SPA; Ret	FRA; 2	ITA; 1	CAT; 1	**NED**; 1	GBR; 1	GER; 1	CZE; 1	POR; 2	BRA; 4	PAC; 2	MAL; Ret	AUS; 1	**VAL**; 1			**1st**	**298**
2003	MotoGP	Yamaha	JPN; WD	RSA	SPA; 17	FRA; 15	ITA; 11	CAT; 13	NED; Ret	GBR; Ret	GER; Ret	CZE; 10	POR; 7	BRA; 11	PAC; 5	MAL; 11	AUS; Ret	VAL			15th	45
2004	MotoGP	Yamaha	RSA; 11	SPA; Ret	FRA; 6	ITA; 9	CAT; 3	NED; 3	BRA; 13	GER; Ret	GBR; DNS	CZE; 9	POR; Ret	JPN; 5	QAT; Ret	MAL; Ret	AUS; Ret	VAL; Ret			12th	75
2005	MotoGP	Honda	SPA; 3	POR; 4	CHN; 3	FRA; 4	ITA; 4	CAT; 3	NED; 2	USA; Ret	GBR; Ret	GER; 7	CZE; 6	JPN; Ret	MAL; 5	QAT; 2	AUS; 4	TUR; 1	VAL; 1		**2nd**	**220**
2006	MotoGP	Honda	SPA; 5	QAT; 7	TUR; 1	CHN; 7	FRA; 1	ITA; 6	CAT; Ret	NED; 7	GBR; 3	GER; 2	USA; 3	CZE; 5	MAL; 9	AUS; 1	JPN; 3	POR; 8	VAL; 5		4th	228
2007	MotoGP	Honda	QAT; 5	SPA; 8	CHN; 5	TUR; 5	FRA; 2	ITA; 9	CAT; 9	GBR; 10	NED; 10	GER; 6	USA; 3	CZE; WD	RSM; 4	POR; 5	JPN; 5	AUS; 10	MAL; 2	VAL; 4	5th	187
2008	MotoGP	Ducati	QAT; 11	SPA; 12	POR; 13	CHN; 5	FRA; 15	ITA; Ret	CAT; 11	GBR; 16	NED; 13	GER; Ret	USA; 16	CZE; 7	RSM; 9	INP; 19	JPN; 13	AUS; 16	MAL; 16	VAL; 16	17th	51
2009	MotoGP	Kawasaki	QAT; 14	JPN; 6	SPA; 5	FRA; 2	ITA; 11	CAT; 14	NED; 12	USA; 10	GER; 7	GBR; 7	CZE; Ret	INP; Ret	RSM; 8	POR; 12	AUS; 7	MAL; 8	VAL; 17		10th	108
2010	MotoGP	Honda	QAT; 13	SPA; 8	FRA; 6	ITA; 5	GBR; Ret	NED; DNS	CAT; 9	GER; 10	USA; 8	CZE; 8	INP; Ret	RSM; 10	ARA; 9	JPN; 11	MAL; 9	AUS; 9	POR; 9	VAL; 13	10th	103
2015	MotoGP	Aprilia	QAT; 21	AME; Ret	ARG; 20	SPA; 19	FRA; 18	ITA; 18	CAT; Ret	NED; 19	GER	INP	CZE	GBR	RSM	ARA	JPN	AUS	MAL	VAL	NC	0

=== Superbike World Championship ===
==== By season ====
Season	Motorcycle	Team	Race	Win	Podium	Pole	FLap	Pts	Plcd	WCh
2011	Yamaha YZF-R1	Yamaha World Superbike Team	26	4	15	1	3	395	**2nd**	–
2012	BMW S1000RR	BMW Motorrad Motorsport	25	6	11	0	4	328.5	**3rd**	–
2013	BMW S1000RR	BMW Motorrad Motorsport	26	3	12	0	2	359	4th	–
2014	Aprilia RSV4	Aprilia Racing Team	24	6	11	0	3	333	4th	–
2017	Ducati Panigale R	Aruba.it Racing – Ducati	26	1	13	1	4	327	4th	–
2018	Ducati Panigale R	Aruba.it Racing – Ducati	25	2	10	2	5	297	5th	–
Total			**152**	**22**	**72**	**4**	**21**	**2039.5**		**0**

==== Races by year ====
(key) (Races in bold indicate pole position; races in italics indicate fastest lap)

Year	Bike	1		2		3		4		5		6		7		8		9		10		11		12		13		14		Pos	Pts
Year	Bike	R1	R2	R1	R2	R1	R2	R1	R2	R1	R2	R1	R2	R1	R2	R1	R2	R1	R2	R1	R2	R1	R2	R1	R2	R1	R2	R1	R2	Pos	Pts
2011	Yamaha	AUS; 5	AUS; 3	EUR; 1	EUR; 2	NED; 4	NED; Ret	ITA; 4	ITA; 2	USA; 10	USA; 6	SMR; 3	SMR; Ret	**SPA**; 1	**SPA**; 2	CZE; 1	CZE; 2	GBR; 3	GBR; 3	GER; 2	GER; 6	ITA; 8	ITA; 6	FRA; 2	FRA; 2	POR; 6	POR; 1			**2nd**	**395**
2012	BMW	AUS; 2	AUS; 6	ITA; 6	ITA; 10	NED; 9	NED; 4	ITA; C	ITA; 4	EUR; 1	EUR; Ret	USA; 2	USA; 1	SMR; Ret	SMR; 4	SPA; 2	SPA; 1	CZE; 1	CZE; 1	GBR; 7	GBR; 8	RUS; 2	RUS; 1	GER; Ret	GER; Ret	POR; Ret	POR; DNS	FRA; 2	FRA; Ret	**3rd**	**328.5**
2013	BMW	AUS; Ret	AUS; 3	SPA; 3	SPA; 5	NED; Ret	NED; 8	ITA; 1	ITA; 2	GBR; 2	GBR; 5	POR; 1	POR; 12	ITA; 4	ITA; 4	RUS; 1	RUS; C	GBR; 9	GBR; 9	GER; 2	GER; 3	TUR; 2	TUR; 4	USA; 4	USA; 3	FRA; 5	FRA; 7	SPA; 2	SPA; DNS	4th	359
2014	Aprilia	AUS; 2	AUS; 8	SPA; 11	SPA; 3	NED; 6	NED; 6	ITA; 6	ITA; 11	GBR; 4	GBR; 17	MAL; 1	MAL; 1	SMR; 3	SMR; 3	POR; 4	POR; Ret	USA; 1	USA; Ret	SPA; 1	SPA; 1	FRA; 2	FRA; 1	QAT; 8	QAT; 4					4th	333
2017	Ducati	AUS; Ret	AUS; 3	THA; 4	THA; 3	SPA; 2	SPA; 3	NED; 3	NED; Ret	ITA; 3	ITA; 5	GBR; 4	GBR; Ret	ITA; 15	ITA; 1	USA; 4	USA; 4	GER; 4	GER; 3	POR; 3	POR; 3	FRA; 2	FRA; 5	**SPA**; Ret	SPA; 2	QAT; 3	QAT; 6			4th	327
2018	Ducati	AUS; 1	AUS; 1	THA; 8	THA; 7	**SPA**; 4	SPA; 3	NED; 6	NED; 7	ITA; 3	ITA; Ret	GBR; 22	GBR; 11	CZE; 2	CZE; 15	USA; 5	USA; Ret	ITA; 7	ITA; 3	POR; 2	POR; 3	FRA; 6	FRA; 5	**ARG**; 2	ARG; 3	QAT; 5	QAT; C			5th	297

Year	Bike	1			2			3			4			5			6			7			8			9			10			11			12			13			Pos	Pts
Year	Bike	R1	SR	R2	R1	SR	R2	R1	SR	R2	R1	SR	R2	R1	SR	R2	R1	SR	R2	R1	SR	R2	R1	SR	R2	R1	SR	R2	R1	SR	R2	R1	SR	R2	R1	SR	R2	R1	SR	R2	Pos	Pts
2019	Yamaha	AUS; 3	AUS; 6	AUS; 6	THA; 6	THA; 6	THA; 6	SPA; 12	SPA; 11	SPA; 11	NED; 12	NED; C	NED; 14	ITA; 6	ITA; 17	ITA; C	SPA; 3	SPA; 3	SPA; Ret	ITA; 6	ITA; 6	ITA; 16	GBR; 14	GBR; 10	GBR; 10	USA; 9	USA; 16	USA; 9	POR; 9	POR; 13	POR; 8	FRA; 8	FRA; 12	FRA; 6	ARG; DNS	ARG; 15	ARG; 14	QAT; 12	QAT; 10	QAT; 17	9th	177
2020	Ducati	AUS	AUS	AUS	SPA; 8	SPA; 18	SPA; 9	POR; 17	POR; 15	POR; 14	SPA; 14	SPA; 17	SPA; Ret	SPA; Ret	SPA; 17	SPA; 12	SPA	SPA	SPA	FRA	FRA	FRA	POR	POR	POR																17th	23
