= 1998 Dutch TT =

Round of motorcycle racing

(Netherlands) 1998 Dutch Grand Prix
Race details
- Race 7 of 14 races in the 1998 Grand Prix motorcycle racing season
- Date: 27 June 1998
- Official name: Rizla Dutch TT
- Location: TT Circuit Assen
- Course: Permanent racing facility; 6.049 km (3.759 mi)

500cc
Pole position
- Rider: (Australia) Mick Doohan
- Time: 2:02.092
Fastest lap
- Rider: (Australia) Mick Doohan
- Time: 2:02.941 on lap 20
Podium
- First: (Australia) Mick Doohan
- Second: (Italy) Max Biaggi
- Third: (New Zealand) Simon Crafar

250cc
Pole position
- Rider: (Italy) Loris Capirossi
- Time: 2:05.567
Fastest lap
- Rider: (Japan) Tetsuya Harada
- Time: 2:06.452 on lap 3
Podium
- First: (Italy) Valentino Rossi
- Second: (Germany) Jürgen Fuchs
- Third: (Japan) Haruchika Aoki

125cc
Pole position
- Rider: (Japan) Kazuto Sakata
- Time: 2:13.411
Fastest lap
- Rider: (Japan) Tomomi Manako
- Time: 2:14.378 on lap 16
Podium
- First: (Italy) Marco Melandri
- Second: (Japan) Kazuto Sakata
- Third: (Japan) Tomomi Manako

The 1998 Dutch TT was the seventh round of the 1998 Grand Prix motorcycle racing season. It took place on 27 June 1998 at the TT Circuit Assen located in Assen, Netherlands.

== 500 cc classification ==
Pos.	No.	Rider	Team	Manufacturer	Laps	Time/Retired	Grid	Points
1	1	(Australia) Mick Doohan	Repsol Honda	Honda	20	41:17.788	1	25
2	6	(Italy) Max Biaggi	Marlboro Team Kanemoto	Honda	20	+0.560	4	20
3	11	(New Zealand) Simon Crafar	Red Bull Yamaha WCM	Yamaha	20	+1.151	2	16
4	9	(Brazil) Alex Barros	Honda Gresini	Honda	20	+5.151	6	13
5	8	(Spain) Carlos Checa	Movistar Honda Pons	Honda	20	+13.827	5	11
6	4	(Spain) Àlex Crivillé	Repsol Honda	Honda	20	+21.256	9	10
7	3	(Japan) Nobuatsu Aoki	Suzuki Grand Prix Team	Suzuki	20	+28.877	8	9
8	2	(Japan) Tadayuki Okada	Repsol Honda	Honda	20	+33.544	10	8
9	55	(France) Régis Laconi	Red Bull Yamaha WCM	Yamaha	20	+44.870	17	7
10	17	(Netherlands) Jurgen van den Goorbergh	Dee Cee Jeans Racing Team	Honda	20	+48.118	11	6
11	18	(Australia) Garry McCoy	Shell Advance Racing	Honda	20	+1:11.257	15	5
12	10	(United States) Kenny Roberts Jr.	Team Roberts	Modenas KR3	20	+1:30.137	13	4
13	23	(United States) Matt Wait	FCC TSR	Honda	20	+1:39.885	19	3
14	88	(United Kingdom) Scott Smart	Team Millar Honda Britain	Honda	20	+2:49.856	20	2
15	26	(France) Bernard Garcia	Tecmas Honda Elf	Honda	20	+3:02.687	18	1
Ret	5	(Japan) Norick Abe	Yamaha Team Rainey	Yamaha	16	Retirement	3	
Ret	15	(Spain) Sete Gibernau	Repsol Honda	Honda	16	Retirement	12	
Ret	20	(Italy) Luca Cadalora	Suzuki Grand Prix Team	Suzuki	9	Accident	7	
Ret	14	(Spain) Juan Borja	Shell Advance Racing	Honda	9	Accident	16	
Ret	16	(France) Jean-Philippe Ruggia	MuZ Roc RennSport	MuZ	5	Retirement	14	
DNS	28	(Germany) Ralf Waldmann	Marlboro Team Roberts	Modenas KR3		Did not start		
DNS	19	(United States) John Kocinski	Movistar Honda Pons	Honda		Did not start		
DNQ	57	(Italy) Fabio Carpani	Team Polini Inoxmacel	Honda		Did not qualify		

== 250 cc classification ==
Pos.	No.	Rider	Manufacturer	Laps	Time/Retired	Grid	Points
1	46	(Italy) Valentino Rossi	Aprilia	18	38:31.905	3	25
2	11	(Germany) Jürgen Fuchs	Aprilia	18	+19.184	4	20
3	6	(Japan) Haruchika Aoki	Honda	18	+19.516	5	16
4	8	(Spain) Luis d'Antin	Yamaha	18	+21.682	21	13
5	5	(Japan) Tohru Ukawa	Honda	18	+21.721	6	11
6	27	(Argentina) Sebastián Porto	Aprilia	18	+21.927	9	10
7	7	(Japan) Takeshi Tsujimura	Yamaha	18	+22.084	10	9
8	24	(United Kingdom) Jason Vincent	TSR-Honda	18	+27.290	17	8
9	37	(Italy) Luca Boscoscuro	TSR-Honda	18	+33.444	15	7
10	44	(Italy) Roberto Rolfo	TSR-Honda	18	+37.467	11	6
11	12	(Japan) Noriyasu Numata	Suzuki	18	+42.228	12	5
12	9	(United Kingdom) Jeremy McWilliams	TSR-Honda	18	+42.659	13	4
13	20	(France) William Costes	Honda	18	+50.841	16	3
14	47	(Italy) Ivan Clementi	Yamaha	18	+52.029	22	2
15	16	(Sweden) Johan Stigefelt	Suzuki	18	+53.759	20	1
16	25	(Japan) Yasumasa Hatakeyama	ERP Honda	18	+1:08.503	19	
17	14	(Italy) Davide Bulega	ERP Honda	18	+1:08.716	18	
18	76	(Netherlands) Jarno Janssen	Honda	18	+1:21.462	24	
19	75	(Netherlands) Maurice Bolwerk	Honda	18	+1:21.546	23	
20	78	(Netherlands) Rudie Markink	Honda	18	+1:44.511	25	
21	77	(Netherlands) André Romein	Honda	18	+2:11.041	26	
Ret	17	(Spain) José Luis Cardoso	Yamaha	12	Accident	14	
Ret	65	(Italy) Loris Capirossi	Aprilia	9	Retirement	1	
Ret	31	(Japan) Tetsuya Harada	Aprilia	8	Retirement	2	
Ret	19	(France) Olivier Jacque	Honda	4	Accident	7	
Ret	4	(Italy) Stefano Perugini	Honda	4	Accident	8	
DNS	18	(Japan) Osamu Miyazaki	Yamaha		Did not start		
DNQ	79	(Netherlands) Henk van de Lagemaat	Honda		Did not qualify		
WD	41	(Argentina) Federico Gartner	Aprilia		Withdrew		

== 125 cc classification ==
Pos.	No.	Rider	Manufacturer	Laps	Time/Retired	Grid	Points
1	13	(Italy) Marco Melandri	Honda	17	38:27.391	6	25
2	4	(Japan) Kazuto Sakata	Aprilia	17	+0.028	1	20
3	3	(Japan) Tomomi Manako	Honda	17	+9.626	3	16
4	10	(Italy) Lucio Cecchinello	Honda	17	+10.331	8	13
5	5	(Japan) Masaki Tokudome	Aprilia	17	+10.410	2	11
6	32	(Italy) Mirko Giansanti	Honda	17	+10.425	4	10
7	15	(Italy) Roberto Locatelli	Honda	17	+10.700	7	9
8	9	(France) Frédéric Petit	Honda	17	+11.417	12	8
9	22	(Germany) Steve Jenkner	Aprilia	17	+14.678	10	7
10	20	(Japan) Masao Azuma	Honda	17	+24.158	5	6
11	23	(Italy) Gino Borsoi	Aprilia	17	+25.011	14	5
12	41	(Japan) Youichi Ui	Yamaha	17	+30.265	13	4
13	52	(Japan) Hiroyuki Kikuchi	Honda	17	+30.369	15	3
14	26	(Italy) Ivan Goi	Aprilia	17	+33.345	9	2
15	39	(Czech Republic) Jaroslav Huleš	Honda	17	+33.527	21	1
16	21	(France) Arnaud Vincent	Aprilia	17	+33.742	11	
17	29	(Spain) Ángel Nieto, Jr.	Aprilia	17	+36.359	20	
18	14	(Italy) Federico Cerroni	Aprilia	17	+59.159	19	
19	17	(Spain) Enrique Maturana	Yamaha	17	+1:02.676	23	
20	59	(Spain) Jerónimo Vidal	Aprilia	17	+1:02.920	17	
21	65	(Italy) Andrea Iommi	Honda	17	+1:43.557	24	
22	74	(Netherlands) Hans Koopman	EGA Honda	17	+3:53.297	25	
23	78	(Netherlands) Wilhelm van Leeuwen	Honda	16	+1 lap	27	
24	76	(Netherlands) Harold de Haan	Honda	16	+1 lap	28	
Ret	62	(Japan) Yoshiaki Katoh	Yamaha	10	Retirement	22	
Ret	8	(Italy) Gianluigi Scalvini	Honda	9	Accident	16	
Ret	16	(Italy) Christian Manna	Yamaha	9	Retirement	26	
Ret	7	(Spain) Emilio Alzamora	Aprilia	0	Retirement	18	
DNQ	77	(Netherlands) Ronnie Timmer	Honda		Did not qualify		
DNQ	75	(Netherlands) Wim Kroegman	Yamaha		Did not qualify		

== Championship standings after the race (500cc) ==
Below are the standings for the top five riders and constructors after round seven has concluded.

Riders' Championship standings

Pos.	Rider	Points
1	(Italy) Max Biaggi	118
2	(Australia) Mick Doohan	115
3	(Spain) Àlex Crivillé	113
4	(Spain) Carlos Checa	106
5	(Japan) Nobuatsu Aoki	56

Constructors' Championship standings

Pos.	Constructor	Points
1	(Japan) Honda	175
2	(Japan) Yamaha	91
3	(Japan) Suzuki	66
4	(Malaysia) Modenas KR3	38
5	(Germany) MuZ	6

- Note: Only the top five positions are included for both sets of standings.

Previous race: 1998 Madrid Grand Prix	FIM Grand Prix World Championship; 1998 season	Next race: 1998 British Grand Prix
Previous race: 1997 Dutch TT	Dutch TT	Next race: 1999 Dutch TT
