= Matt Wait =

American motorcycle racer

- Nationality: American
- Born: June 2, 1976 (age 50); Lodi, California
Motorcycle racing career statistics
500cc World Championship
Active years	1998
Manufacturers	Honda
Championships	0
1998 championship position	19th (17 pts)
Starts / Wins / Podiums / Poles / F. laps / Points; 14 / 0 / 0 / 0 / 0 / 17

Matt Wait (born June 2, 1976 in Lodi, California, United States) is an American motorcycle racer.

== Grand Prix motorcycle racing ==
=== By season ===
Season	Class	Motorcycle	Race	Win	Podium	Pole	FLap	Pts	Plcd
1998	500cc	Honda	14	0	0	0	0	17	19th
Total			**14**	**0**	**0**	**0**	**0**	**17**	

=== Races by year ===
(key) (Races in bold indicate pole position, races in italics indicate fastest lap)

Year	Class	Bike	1	2	3	4	5	6	7	8	9	10	11	12	13	14	Pos.	Pts
1998	500cc	Honda	JPN; Ret	MAL; 12	SPA; 20	ITA; Ret	FRA; 18	MAD; 13	NED; 13	GBR; Ret	GER; 14	CZE; 20	IMO; 18	CAT; 14	AUS; 13	ARG; 17	19th	17
