= 1998 Madrid motorcycle Grand Prix =

(Community of Madrid) 1998 Madrid Grand Prix
Race details
- Race 6 of 14 races in the 1998 Grand Prix motorcycle racing season
- Date: 14 June 1998
- Official name: Gran Premio Comunidad de Madrid
- Location: Circuito del Jarama
- Course: Permanent racing facility; 3.850 km (2.392 mi)

500cc
Pole position
- Rider: (Australia) Mick Doohan
- Time: 1:32.493
Fastest lap
- Rider: (Spain) Carlos Checa
- Time: 1:33.617 on lap 2
Podium
- First: (Spain) Carlos Checa
- Second: (Japan) Norick Abe
- Third: (Spain) Sete Gibernau

250cc
Pole position
- Rider: (Italy) Loris Capirossi
- Time: 1:34.382
Fastest lap
- Rider: (Japan) Tetsuya Harada
- Time: 1:35.012 on lap 4
Podium
- First: (Japan) Tetsuya Harada
- Second: (Japan) Tohru Ukawa
- Third: (Italy) Loris Capirossi

125cc
Pole position
- Rider: (Japan) Kazuto Sakata
- Time: 1:38.952
Fastest lap
- Rider: (Japan) Kazuto Sakata
- Time: 1:39.330 on lap 7
Podium
- First: (Italy) Lucio Cecchinello
- Second: (Italy) Marco Melandri
- Third: (Japan) Hiroyuki Kikuchi

The 1998 Madrid motorcycle Grand Prix was the sixth round of the 1998 Grand Prix motorcycle racing season. It took place on 14 June 1998 at the Circuito Permanente del Jarama. It was held to replace the Portuguese Grand Prix due to homologation issues of the Autódromo do Estoril.

== 500 cc classification ==
Pos.	No.	Rider	Team	Manufacturer	Laps	Time/Retired	Grid	Points
1	8	(Spain) Carlos Checa	Movistar Honda Pons	Honda	30	47:21.513	3	25
2	5	(Japan) Norick Abe	Yamaha Team Rainey	Yamaha	30	+0.220	8	20
3	15	(Spain) Sete Gibernau	Repsol Honda	Honda	30	+1.886	14	16
4	3	(Japan) Nobuatsu Aoki	Suzuki Grand Prix Team	Suzuki	30	+5.206	9	13
5	4	(Spain) Àlex Crivillé	Repsol Honda	Honda	30	+11.165	4	11
6	6	(Italy) Max Biaggi	Marlboro Team Kanemoto	Honda	30	+11.579	10	10
7	55	(France) Régis Laconi	Red Bull Yamaha WCM	Yamaha	30	+11.711	5	9
8	11	(New Zealand) Simon Crafar	Red Bull Yamaha WCM	Yamaha	30	+32.658	6	8
9	9	(Brazil) Alex Barros	Honda Gresini	Honda	30	+36.226	13	7
10	28	(Germany) Ralf Waldmann	Marlboro Team Roberts	Modenas KR3	30	+55.342	11	6
11	18	(Australia) Garry McCoy	Shell Advance Racing	Honda	30	+56.938	16	5
12	88	(United Kingdom) Scott Smart	Team Millar Honda Britain	Honda	30	+1:22.806	18	4
13	23	(United States) Matt Wait	FCC TSR	Honda	30	+1:26.677	17	3
14	77	(Switzerland) Eskil Suter	MuZ Roc RennSport	MuZ	29	+1 lap	19	2
15	72	(Spain) Fernando Cristóbal	Shell Advance Racing	Honda	29	+1 lap	20	1
16	57	(Italy) Fabio Carpani	Team Polini Inoxmacel	Honda	29	+1 lap	21	
Ret	20	(Italy) Luca Cadalora	Yamaha Team Rainey	Yamaha	26	Retirement	2	
Ret	17	(Netherlands) Jurgen van den Goorbergh	Dee Cee Jeans Racing Team	Honda	20	Retirement	12	
Ret	14	(Spain) Juan Borja	Shell Advance Racing	Honda	15	Retirement	15	
Ret	1	(Australia) Mick Doohan	Repsol Honda	Honda	0	Accident	1	
Ret	19	(United States) John Kocinski	Movistar Honda Pons	Honda	0	Accident	7	
DNQ	22	(France) Sébastien Gimbert	Tecmas Honda Elf	Honda		Did not qualify		
WD	10	(United States) Kenny Roberts Jr.	Team Roberts	Modenas KR3		Withdrew		

== 250 cc classification ==
Pos.	No.	Rider	Manufacturer	Laps	Time/Retired	Grid	Points
1	31	(Japan) Tetsuya Harada	Aprilia	28	44:44.553	2	25
2	5	(Japan) Tohru Ukawa	Honda	28	+8.738	3	20
3	65	(Italy) Loris Capirossi	Aprilia	28	+15.978	1	16
4	11	(Germany) Jürgen Fuchs	Aprilia	28	+22.545	6	13
5	17	(Spain) José Luis Cardoso	Yamaha	28	+24.444	10	11
6	8	(Spain) Luis d'Antin	Yamaha	28	+33.716	9	10
7	7	(Japan) Takeshi Tsujimura	Yamaha	28	+33.791	18	9
8	24	(United Kingdom) Jason Vincent	TSR-Honda	28	+46.342	11	8
9	9	(United Kingdom) Jeremy McWilliams	TSR-Honda	28	+50.206	7	7
10	44	(Italy) Roberto Rolfo	TSR-Honda	28	+51.016	16	6
11	47	(Italy) Ivan Clementi	Yamaha	28	+1:04.474	21	5
12	16	(Sweden) Johan Stigefelt	Suzuki	28	+1:11.969	19	4
13	25	(Japan) Yasumasa Hatakeyama	ERP Honda	28	+1:30.205	14	3
14	14	(Italy) Davide Bulega	ERP Honda	27	+1 lap	22	2
15	59	(Spain) Ismael Bonilla	Honda	27	+1 lap	24	1
16	41	(Argentina) Federico Gartner	Aprilia	27	+1 lap	25	
Ret	6	(Japan) Haruchika Aoki	Honda	27	Accident	8	
Ret	27	(Argentina) Sebastián Porto	Aprilia	14	Retirement	17	
Ret	4	(Italy) Stefano Perugini	Honda	12	Retirement	12	
Ret	20	(France) William Costes	Honda	12	Retirement	20	
Ret	46	(Italy) Valentino Rossi	Aprilia	4	Retirement	4	
Ret	12	(Japan) Noriyasu Numata	Suzuki	3	Retirement	13	
Ret	19	(France) Olivier Jacque	Honda	2	Accident	5	
Ret	37	(Italy) Luca Boscoscuro	TSR-Honda	0	Accident	15	
Ret	73	(Spain) Alex Debón	Honda	0	Accident	23	
DNS	21	(Italy) Franco Battaini	Yamaha		Did not start		
DNQ	72	(Spain) José David de Gea	Yamaha		Did not qualify		

== 125 cc classification ==
Pos.	No.	Rider	Manufacturer	Laps	Time/Retired	Grid	Points
1	10	(Italy) Lucio Cecchinello	Honda	26	43:28.423	8	25
2	13	(Italy) Marco Melandri	Honda	26	+9.173	3	20
3	52	(Japan) Hiroyuki Kikuchi	Honda	26	+9.317	11	16
4	4	(Japan) Kazuto Sakata	Aprilia	26	+17.268	1	13
5	8	(Italy) Gianluigi Scalvini	Honda	26	+19.417	12	11
6	29	(Spain) Ángel Nieto, Jr.	Aprilia	26	+19.511	16	10
7	41	(Japan) Youichi Ui	Yamaha	26	+21.010	19	9
8	9	(France) Frédéric Petit	Honda	26	+23.034	5	8
9	5	(Japan) Masaki Tokudome	Aprilia	26	+23.066	15	7
10	22	(Germany) Steve Jenkner	Aprilia	26	+23.552	18	6
11	62	(Japan) Yoshiaki Katoh	Yamaha	26	+26.762	21	5
12	39	(Czech Republic) Jaroslav Huleš	Honda	26	+31.484	20	4
13	58	(Spain) Álvaro Molina	Honda	26	+41.584	23	3
14	60	(Spain) Fonsi Nieto	Aprilia	26	+42.512	22	2
15	17	(Spain) Enrique Maturana	Yamaha	26	+50.521	27	1
16	23	(Italy) Gino Borsoi	Aprilia	26	+55.673	14	
17	71	(Spain) Josep Sardá	Honda	26	+59.576	26	
18	65	(Italy) Andrea Iommi	Honda	26	+1:10.446	28	
19	73	(Spain) Iván Martínez	Aprilia	26	+1:33.316	24	
Ret	32	(Italy) Mirko Giansanti	Honda	24	Accident	7	
Ret	3	(Japan) Tomomi Manako	Honda	24	Accident	9	
Ret	15	(Italy) Roberto Locatelli	Honda	20	Retirement	4	
Ret	59	(Spain) Jerónimo Vidal	Aprilia	18	Accident	17	
Ret	7	(Spain) Emilio Alzamora	Aprilia	17	Retirement	2	
Ret	26	(Italy) Ivan Goi	Aprilia	15	Retirement	13	
Ret	14	(Italy) Federico Cerroni	Aprilia	14	Accident	25	
Ret	20	(Japan) Masao Azuma	Honda	13	Accident	6	
Ret	16	(Italy) Christian Manna	Yamaha	10	Retirement	29	
Ret	21	(France) Arnaud Vincent	Aprilia	2	Accident	10	
DNS	72	(Spain) Sebastián Perelló	Honda		Did not start		

== Championship standings after the race (500cc) ==
Below are the standings for the top five riders and constructors after round six has concluded.

Riders' Championship standings

Pos.	Rider	Points
1	(Spain) Àlex Crivillé	103
2	(Italy) Max Biaggi	98
3	(Spain) Carlos Checa	95
4	(Australia) Mick Doohan	90
5	(Japan) Norifumi Abe	51

Constructors' Championship standings

Pos.	Constructor	Points
1	(Japan) Honda	150
2	(Japan) Yamaha	75
3	(Japan) Suzuki	57
4	(Malaysia) Modenas KR3	34
5	(Germany) MuZ	6

- Note: Only the top five positions are included for both sets of standings.

Previous race: 1998 French Grand Prix	FIM Grand Prix World Championship; 1998 season	Next race: 1998 Dutch TT
Previous race: None	Madrid Grand Prix	Next race: None
