= 1998 British motorcycle Grand Prix =

(United Kingdom) 1998 British Grand Prix
Race details
- Race 8 of 14 races in the 1998 Grand Prix motorcycle racing season
- Date: 5 July 1998
- Official name: British Grand Prix
- Location: Donington Park
- Course: Permanent racing facility; 4.023 km (2.500 mi)

500cc
Pole position
- Rider: (New Zealand) Simon Crafar
- Time: 1:32.128
Fastest lap
- Rider: (New Zealand) Simon Crafar
- Time: 1:32.661 on lap 14
Podium
- First: (New Zealand) Simon Crafar
- Second: (Australia) Mick Doohan
- Third: (Japan) Norick Abe

250cc
Pole position
- Rider: (Italy) Loris Capirossi
- Time: 1:34.085
Fastest lap
- Rider: (Italy) Loris Capirossi
- Time: 1:34.188 on lap 26
Podium
- First: (Italy) Loris Capirossi
- Second: (Japan) Tetsuya Harada
- Third: (Italy) Stefano Perugini

125cc
Pole position
- Rider: (Japan) Kazuto Sakata
- Time: 1:39.294
Fastest lap
- Rider: (Japan) Kazuto Sakata
- Time: 1:39.465 on lap 7
Podium
- First: (Japan) Kazuto Sakata
- Second: (Italy) Mirko Giansanti
- Third: (Japan) Youichi Ui

The 1998 British motorcycle Grand Prix was the eighth round of the 1998 Grand Prix motorcycle racing season. It took place on 5 July 1998 at Donington Park. In the 125cc class this race was Kazuto Sakata's last victory in his career

== 500 cc classification ==
Pos.	No.	Rider	Team	Manufacturer	Laps	Time/Retired	Grid	Points
1	11	(New Zealand) Simon Crafar	Red Bull Yamaha WCM	Yamaha	30	46:45.662	1	25
2	1	(Australia) Mick Doohan	Repsol Honda	Honda	30	+11.530	2	20
3	5	(Japan) Norick Abe	Yamaha Team Rainey	Yamaha	30	+17.924	4	16
4	4	(Spain) Àlex Crivillé	Repsol Honda	Honda	30	+22.933	5	13
5	9	(Brazil) Alex Barros	Honda Gresini	Honda	30	+23.430	7	11
6	6	(Italy) Max Biaggi	Marlboro Team Kanemoto	Honda	30	+35.214	3	10
7	3	(Japan) Nobuatsu Aoki	Suzuki Grand Prix Team	Suzuki	30	+53.997	8	9
8	55	(France) Régis Laconi	Red Bull Yamaha WCM	Yamaha	30	+1:08.211	9	8
9	17	(Netherlands) Jurgen van den Goorbergh	Dee Cee Jeans Racing Team	Honda	30	+1:39.256	12	7
10	88	(United Kingdom) Scott Smart	Team Millar Honda Britain	Honda	29	+1 lap	13	6
11	26	(France) Bernard Garcia	Tecmas Honda Elf	Honda	29	+1 lap	16	5
12	68	(United Kingdom) John McGuinness	Team Vimto Honda / Paul Bird	Honda	29	+1 lap	17	4
13	18	(Australia) Garry McCoy	Shell Advance Racing	Honda	29	+1 lap	11	3
14	72	(Spain) Fernando Cristóbal	Shell Advance Racing	Honda	29	+1 lap	18	2
15	57	(Italy) Fabio Carpani	Team Polini Inoxmacel	Honda	28	+2 laps	19	1
Ret	10	(United States) Kenny Roberts Jr.	Team Roberts	Modenas KR3	27	Retirement	6	
Ret	15	(Spain) Sete Gibernau	Repsol Honda	Honda	20	Accident	10	
Ret	77	(Switzerland) Eskil Suter	MuZ Roc RennSport	MuZ	11	Retirement	14	
Ret	23	(United States) Matt Wait	FCC TSR	Honda	9	Retirement	15	
DNS	14	(Spain) Juan Borja	Movistar Honda Pons	Honda		Did not start		
WD	8	(Spain) Carlos Checa	Movistar Honda Pons	Honda		Withdrew		

== 250 cc classification ==
Pos.	No.	Rider	Manufacturer	Laps	Time/Retired	Grid	Points
1	65	(Italy) Loris Capirossi	Aprilia	27	42:55.085	1	25
2	31	(Japan) Tetsuya Harada	Aprilia	27	+5.682	3	20
3	4	(Italy) Stefano Perugini	Honda	27	+38.003	5	16
4	5	(Japan) Tohru Ukawa	Honda	27	+38.349	4	13
5	6	(Japan) Haruchika Aoki	Honda	27	+38.461	7	11
6	24	(United Kingdom) Jason Vincent	TSR-Honda	27	+39.084	10	10
7	9	(United Kingdom) Jeremy McWilliams	TSR-Honda	27	+51.804	11	9
8	7	(Japan) Takeshi Tsujimura	Yamaha	27	+58.946	8	8
9	8	(Spain) Luis d'Antin	Yamaha	27	+1:18.487	14	7
10	17	(Spain) José Luis Cardoso	Yamaha	27	+1:19.532	12	6
11	12	(Japan) Noriyasu Numata	Suzuki	27	+1:24.101	13	5
12	44	(Italy) Roberto Rolfo	TSR-Honda	27	+1:25.956	21	4
13	16	(Sweden) Johan Stigefelt	Suzuki	27	+1:26.887	15	3
14	20	(France) William Costes	Honda	27	+1:29.510	16	2
15	25	(Japan) Yasumasa Hatakeyama	ERP Honda	27	+1:35.487	17	1
16	33	(United Kingdom) Jamie Robinson	Yamaha	27	+1:38.052	18	
17	68	(France) Julien Allemand	Honda	26	+1 lap	22	
18	83	(South Africa) Shane Norval	Honda	26	+1 lap	25	
Ret	40	(United Kingdom) Gary May	Aprilia	24	Retirement	23	
Ret	82	(United Kingdom) Woolsey Coulter	Honda	11	Retirement	19	
Ret	80	(United Kingdom) Paul Jones	Aprilia	11	Accident	24	
Ret	11	(Germany) Jürgen Fuchs	Aprilia	4	Accident	9	
Ret	47	(Italy) Ivan Clementi	Yamaha	4	Retirement	20	
Ret	81	(United Kingdom) Callum Ramsay	Honda	3	Retirement	26	
Ret	46	(Italy) Valentino Rossi	Aprilia	2	Accident	2	
DNS	27	(Argentina) Sebastián Porto	Aprilia	0	Not finished warm-up lap	6	
DNS	37	(Italy) Luca Boscoscuro	TSR-Honda		Did not start		
DNS	14	(Italy) Davide Bulega	ERP Honda		Did not start		

== 125 cc classification ==
Pos.	No.	Rider	Manufacturer	Laps	Time/Retired	Grid	Points
1	4	(Japan) Kazuto Sakata	Aprilia	26	43:48.777	1	25
2	32	(Italy) Mirko Giansanti	Honda	26	+0.431	5	20
3	41	(Japan) Youichi Ui	Yamaha	26	+4.600	2	16
4	13	(Italy) Marco Melandri	Honda	26	+5.197	6	13
5	5	(Japan) Masaki Tokudome	Aprilia	26	+5.598	10	11
6	10	(Italy) Lucio Cecchinello	Honda	26	+6.517	13	10
7	23	(Italy) Gino Borsoi	Aprilia	26	+20.153	11	9
8	9	(France) Frédéric Petit	Honda	26	+22.334	7	8
9	8	(Italy) Gianluigi Scalvini	Honda	26	+31.971	12	7
10	26	(Italy) Ivan Goi	Aprilia	26	+37.432	18	6
11	21	(France) Arnaud Vincent	Aprilia	26	+39.361	17	5
12	29	(Spain) Ángel Nieto, Jr.	Aprilia	26	+39.559	14	4
13	14	(Italy) Federico Cerroni	Aprilia	26	+43.031	22	3
14	7	(Spain) Emilio Alzamora	Aprilia	26	+43.714	21	2
15	52	(Japan) Hiroyuki Kikuchi	Honda	26	+44.370	16	1
16	17	(Spain) Enrique Maturana	Yamaha	26	+44.476	19	
17	80	(United Kingdom) Leon Haslam	Honda	26	+1:21.216	28	
18	65	(Italy) Andrea Iommi	Honda	26	+1:24.783	23	
Ret	81	(United Kingdom) Chris Palmer	Honda	22	Retirement	27	
Ret	22	(Germany) Steve Jenkner	Aprilia	20	Accident	8	
Ret	82	(United Kingdom) John Pearson	Honda	14	Retirement	26	
Ret	39	(Czech Republic) Jaroslav Huleš	Honda	10	Retirement	9	
Ret	3	(Japan) Tomomi Manako	Honda	8	Accident	3	
Ret	59	(Spain) Jerónimo Vidal	Aprilia	6	Accident	24	
Ret	16	(Italy) Christian Manna	Yamaha	5	Accident	25	
Ret	15	(Italy) Roberto Locatelli	Honda	4	Accident	4	
Ret	62	(Japan) Yoshiaki Katoh	Yamaha	1	Retirement	15	
Ret	20	(Japan) Masao Azuma	Honda	1	Retirement	20	
Ret	83	(United Kingdom) David Mateer	Honda	0	Retirement	29	

== Championship standings after the race (500cc) ==
Below are the standings for the top five riders and constructors after round eight has concluded.

Riders' Championship standings

Pos.	Rider	Points
1	(Australia) Mick Doohan	135
2	(Italy) Max Biaggi	128
3	(Spain) Àlex Crivillé	126
4	(Spain) Carlos Checa	106
5	(New Zealand) Simon Crafar	75

Constructors' Championship standings

Pos.	Constructor	Points
1	(Japan) Honda	195
2	(Japan) Yamaha	116
3	(Japan) Suzuki	75
4	(Malaysia) Modenas KR3	38
5	(Germany) MuZ	6

- Note: Only the top five positions are included for both sets of standings.

Previous race: 1998 Dutch TT	FIM Grand Prix World Championship; 1998 season	Next race: 1998 German Grand Prix
Previous race: 1997 British Grand Prix	British Grand Prix	Next race: 1999 British Grand Prix
