= Tomomi Manako =

Japanese motorcycle racer (born 1972)

- Nationality: Japanese
Motorcycle racing career statistics
Grand Prix motorcycle racing
Active years	1994 - 1999
First race	1994 125cc German Grand Prix
Last race	1999 250cc Argentine Grand Prix
First win	1996 125cc Catalan Grand Prix
Last win	1998 125cc Argentine Grand Prix
Team(s)	Honda, Yamaha
Starts / Wins / Podiums / Poles / F. laps / Points; 76 / 6 / 23 / 0 / 7 / 752

Tomomi Manako (眞子 智実; born September 16, 1972 in Saga Prefecture, Japan) is a Japanese former professional motorcycle racer. He competed in Grand Prix motorcycle racing from 1994 to 1999. Manako is notable for finishing in the top three of the 125cc world championship for three consecutive years, narrowly missing out on the title in 1998.

== Early career ==
Manako began racing at the relatively late age of 21, competing in the Kyushu Area and Suzuka Area Championship.

== 1994 ==
Manako began competing at national level in the 125cc All-Japan Road Racing Championship and finished the season seventh. Spotted by Honda, he was offered a ride on an RVF750 in the Suzuka 8 Hour Endurance race. Partnered by Tekeshi Tsujimura he finished in 13th place. Midway through the year, he was offered a Honda ride in the 125cc World Championship with the FCC Technical Sports team as a replacement for their injured rider Tomoko Igata. He finished third in his first race and ended the season 20th overall.

== 1995 ==
Now a full-time Grand Prix rider with the team, Manako scored two more third positions and was consistently finishing inside the top-ten. He finished the season eighth overall, and won the Rookie of the Year award. He again rode in the Suzuka 8 Hour with Tsujimura, finishing 15th on board an RVF750.

== 1996 ==
Moving to the UGT Europa team, Manako visited the podium four times, one of which was his maiden Grand Prix win at the Catalunya Grand Prix. He finished third in the Championship and won the IRTA Cup. He was now firmly established as one of the top riders in the 125cc class.

== 1997 ==
The team was now named UGT 3000, and Manako again had an impressive run of form. While another victory eluded him, he scored four second places and two thirds to finish yet again third in the Championship.

== 1998 ==
1998 was the high point of Manako’s career as he put in some outstanding performances in what was to become a dramatic and controversial battle for the title. Apart from three DNFs, he never finished off the podium in 14 races, netting five wins. His main rival was Kazuto Sakata who had gained an early lead in the title chase. In the second half of the season however, Manako was fast and consistent and had closed the gap considerably. After the penultimate round in the 1998 125cc Australian Grand Prix, a fuel sample was taken from Sakata’s machine which was found to be in breach of technical regulations. He was excluded from the results of the race, thus losing out on 13 points for his fourth place. His Aprilia team lodged an appeal against the decision.

With one round remaining, Manako could still win the title if he won the 1998 125cc Argentine Grand Prix with Sakata finishing lower than fourth. Charging through the pack, Manako took the win, while Sakata could only finish fifth. Bizarrely, though Manako now had one more point than Sakata, he could not be crowned Champion as Sakata’s appeal was still pending. In November 1998, the FIM found in favour of Sakata and restored his 13 points from the Australian Grand Prix. Sakata claimed the 125 title by 12 points.

== 1999 ==
Manako switched to the 250cc class riding a Yamaha for Team Kurz. However, the bike was underpowered and uncompetitive against the works machines of the day, and Manako could only manage a best finish of eighth. He ended his final world championship season in 15th place.

== 2000 ==
Manako returned to Japanese domestic racing, this time with Kawasaki where he ran a ZX-9R, scoring a third and a fifth. He also piloted a ZX-12R to 14th place in the Suzuka 8 Hours endurance race with Shigeru Yamashita.

== Post-racing career ==
Manako's association with Kawasaki lead to him becoming Chief Development Rider for their 2007 ZX-6R, launched in December 2006.

== Grand Prix career statistics ==
**Position**	1	2	3	4	5	6	7	8	9	10	11	12	13	14	15
**Points**	25	20	16	13	11	10	9	8	7	6	5	4	3	2	1

(key) (Races in bold indicate pole position; races in italics indicate fastest lap)

Year	Class	Team	1	2	3	4	5	6	7	8	9	10	11	12	13	14	15	16	Points	Rank	Wins
1994	125cc	Honda	AUS -	MAL -	JPN -	ESP -	AUT -	GER; 3	NED; NC	ITA; 8	FRA -	GBR -	CZE -	USA -	ARG -	EUR -			24	20th	0
1995	125cc	Honda	AUS; 3	MAL; 24	JPN; 10	ESP; 9	GER; 9	ITA; 6	NED; 9	FRA; 5	GBR; NC	CZE; 8	BRA; 9	ARG; 9	EUR; 3				102	8th	0
1996	125cc	Honda	MAL; 7	INA; 7	JPN; 4	ESP; 8	ITA; 9	FRA; 2	NED; 5	GER; 8	GBR; 3	AUT; 8	CZE; 3	IMO; 6	CAT; 1	BRA; NC	AUS; 9		167	3rd	1
1997	125cc	Honda	MAL; 7	JPN; 12	ESP; 5	ITA; 5	AUT; 3	FRA; 2	NED; 2	IMO; 2	GER; NC	BRA; 4	GBR; 8	CZE; 2	CAT; 5	INA; 5	AUS; 3		190	3rd	0
1998	125cc	Honda	JPN; 2	MAL; 3	ESP; 2	ITA; 1	FRA; NC	MAD; NC	NED; 3	GBR; NC	GER; 1	CZE; NC	IMO; 1	CAT; 1	AUS; 2	ARG; 1			217	2nd	5
1999	250cc	Yamaha	MAL; NC	JPN; 8	ESP; 14	FRA; 17	ITA; 13	CAT; 12	NED; 13	GBR; 14	GER; 14	CZE; 14	IMO; 14	VAL; NC	AUS; 11	RSA; 12	BRA; 8	ARG; 9	52	15th	0
