= Masao Azuma =

Japanese motorcycle racer

- Nationality: Japanese
Motorcycle racing career statistics
Grand Prix motorcycle racing
Active years	1996 - 2003
First race	125cc 1996 Japanese Grand Prix
Last race	125cc 2003 Valencian Grand Prix
First win	125cc 1998 Australian Grand Prix
Last win	125cc 2002 Brazilian Grand Prix
Team	Honda
Starts / Wins / Podiums / Poles / F. laps / Points; 110 / 10 / 20 / 2 / 12 / 884

Masao Azuma (born March 24, 1971, in Kōchi, Japan) is a Japanese former Grand Prix motorcycle road racer who competed in the 125cc class from 1996 to 2003. During his eight years in the 125 class, he rode exclusively for Honda and used Bridgestone tyres for six of those years. He finished in the top-five of the Championship for four consecutive years.

== Early career ==
Azuma began racing minibikes at an early age in the Japanese national championships. He was the Japanese National 125cc Champion in 1993 and 1994. He made his 125cc World Championship debut as a wildcard at Suzuka in 1996 and finished an impressive sixth.

== 1997 ==
Azuma competed in the full 1997 season for the LB Racing Team and showed good consistency regularly finishing just outside the top-ten. He scored a best finish of fourth, again at his home round at Suzuka. He finished the season in 15th place in the championship.

== 1998 ==
Azuma joined the Leigeois Competition team and aside from four DNFs never finished outside the top-ten. Five podium finishes, including a win in Australia saw him finishing fourth overall in the championship and marked him out as one of the top Japanese riders and a title contender for the following year.

== 1999 ==
With the same team in 1999 (now renamed the Liegeois Playlife Racing Team), Azuma began a serious title bid, winning five of the first eight races, securing two pole positions (the only poles of his career) and leading the 125cc Championship. Disaster awaited at Round 10 in Brno however. During qualifying, a small deer ran onto the track right into the path of Azuma's accelerating motorcycle. In the ensuing crash, Azuma was not seriously injured and raced the next day eventually finishing 12th. However, it was to be a turning point in the year, and perhaps his career. The remaining six rounds saw erratic and relatively poor results from Azuma, while his title rivals Marco Melandri and Emilio Alzamora gained on him in the championship. Melandri scored five race wins in the latter half of the season, and Champion-to-be Alzamora's consistent podium finishes would eventually relegate Azuma to third in the championship. This was to be his highest championship finish.

== 2000 ==
Now under the Benetton Playlife banner, Azuma's 2000 season was an erratic one with four DNFs countered by six podiums. He put together a good string of results towards the end of the season with a fifth, two second places and a win at the final round in Australia, but the inconsistency up to then meant he couldn't challenge for the title. He finished the championship in fourth.

== 2001 ==
The 2001 season started out promising with Azuma winning two of the first three races. By winning the first race of the new season and the last race of the previous season, Azuma was to set a 125 class record that would not be repeated again until 2007 when Hector Faubel won the last race of 2006 and the first race of 2007. However, an inconsistent season was to follow and Azuma never managed to make it onto the podium during the rest of the season. He finished fifth in the championship, almost 100 points behind the eventual Champion Manuel Poggiali.

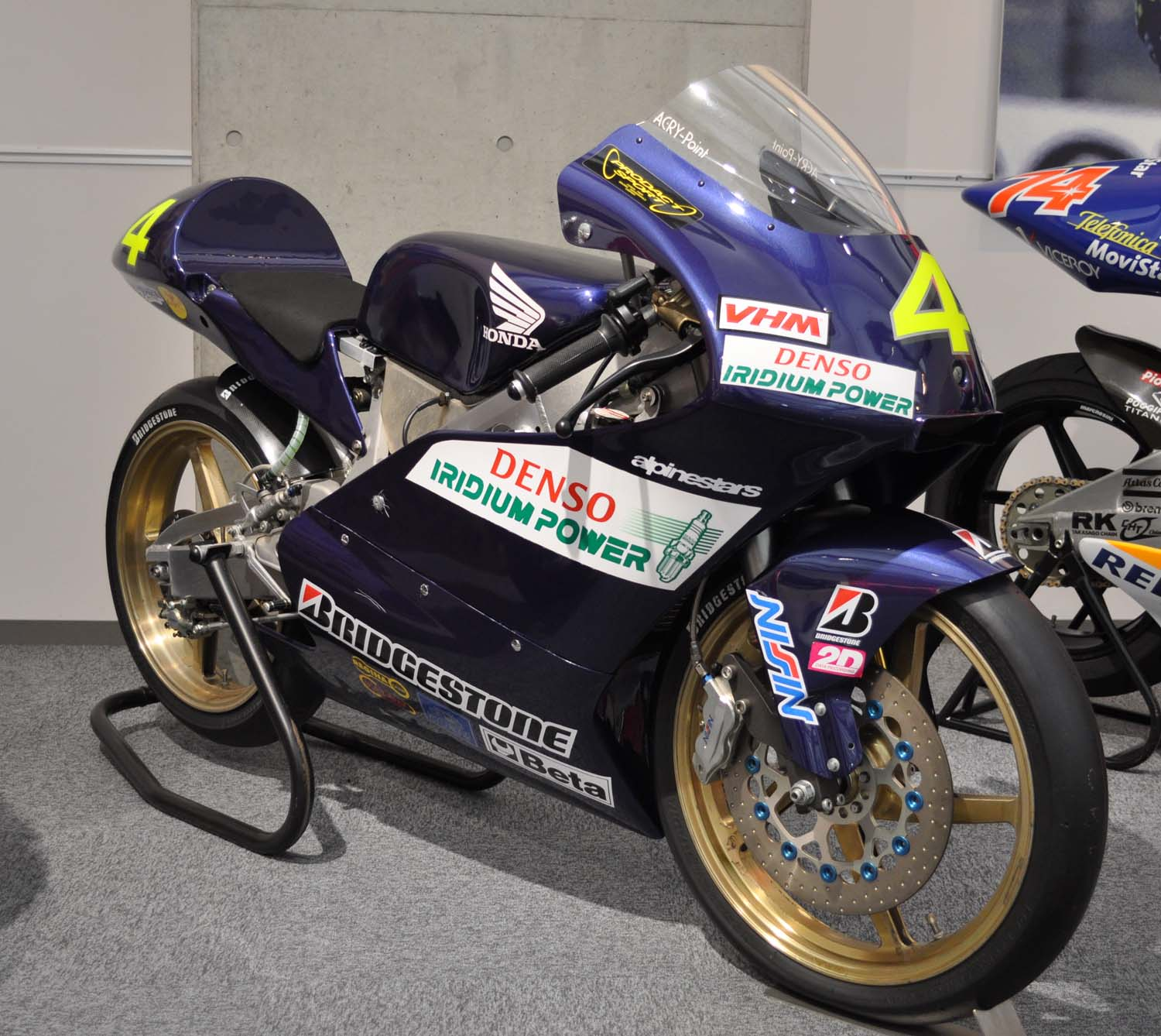
The Honda RS125R used by Masao Azuma in 2001

== 2002 ==
Now in the Trial by Breil team, Azuma's 2002 season got off to a slow start, his only podium appearance being a win at the Brazilian Grand Prix near the end of the season. This was to be his final win at World Championship level. He finished the season eighth in the championship.

== 2003 ==
Moving to the Ajo Motorsports team, Azuma struggled to make headway, with only four top-ten finishes all season and seven DNFs. He announced his retirement at his home race, the Pacific GP at Motegi, with three rounds still to go. At the GP in Australia, he recorded his best result all year with a second place. He retired from racing at the end of the season, finishing in 16th place in the championship.

== Post-racing career ==
While his riding career was over, Azuma continued to work in the MotoGP paddock. In 2007, he worked with Bridgestone tyres as their MotoGP Field Engineer for the Rizla Suzuki MotoGP team, and in 2008, he switched to the works Ducati MotoGP team in the same role.
