= Youichi Ui =

Japanese motorcycle racer (born 1972)

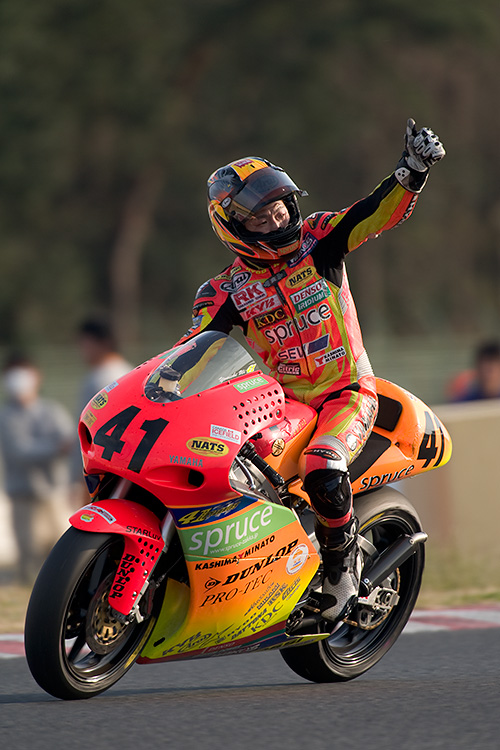
- Youichi Ui at 2009 MFJ Superbike Rd.1
- Nationality: Japanese
- Born: 27 November 1972 (age 53); Tako, Chiba, Japan
Motorcycle racing career statistics
Grand Prix motorcycle racing
Active years	1995 - 2004
First race	1995 125cc Japanese Grand Prix
Last race	2007 250cc Japanese Grand Prix
First win	2000 125cc Japanese Grand Prix
Last win	2001 125cc Brazilian Grand Prix
Team(s)	Yamaha, Derbi, Gilera, Harris WCM
Starts / Wins / Podiums / Poles / F. laps / Points; 133 / 11 / 22 / 17 / 9 / 886

Youichi Ui (宇井陽一, Ui Yōichi; born 27 November 1972) is a Japanese former Grand Prix motorcycle road racer. His best seasons were 2000, when he finished second in the 125cc world championship behind Roberto Locatelli, and in 2001, when he finished second behind Manuel Poggiali. With his six Grand Prix victories in 2001, Ui tied a record set by Kenny Roberts in 1983 of most wins by a rider without winning a championship. He raced in Japan in 2007, winning the All Japan 250cc Road Race Championship.

== By season ==
Seas	Class	Moto	Team	Race	Win	Pod	Pole	FLap	Pts	Plcd
1995	125cc	Yamaha		1					1	31st
1996	125cc	Yamaha		13			1		36	18th
1997	125cc	Yamaha		15		1	2		77	12th
1998	125cc	Yamaha		13		1			76	11th
1999	125cc	Derbi		14		1			84	11th
2000	125cc	Derbi		16	5	10	6	3	217	2nd
2001	125cc	Derbi		16	6	8	7	5	232	2nd
2002	125cc	Derbi		16		1		1	65	13th
2003	125cc	Aprilia		10			1		76	13th
2003	125cc	Gilera		5					76	13th
2004	125cc	Aprilia		9					19	22nd
2004	MotoGP	Harris WCM		3					1	28th
2006	250cc	Yamaha		1					-	-
2007	250cc	Yamaha		1					2	27th

=== Grand Prix motorcycle racing ===
==== Races by year ====
(key) (Races in bold indicate pole position, races in italics indicate fastest lap)

Year	Class	Bike	1	2	3	4	5	6	7	8	9	10	11	12	13	14	15	16	17	Pos.	Pts
1995	125cc	Yamaha	AUS	MAL	JPN; 15	SPA	GER	ITA	NED	FRA	GBR	CZE	BRA	ARG	EUR					31st	1
1996	125cc	Yamaha	MAL; Ret	INA	JPN; Ret	SPA; 17	ITA; 18	FRA; 15	NED; 14	GER; Ret	GBR; 10	AUT; 7	CZE; Ret	IMO; Ret	**CAT**; 6	BRA; 8	AUS; DNS			18th	36
1997	125cc	Yamaha	MAL; Ret	JPN; Ret	SPA; 22	ITA; 10	AUT; 7	FRA; 4	NED; 5	IMO; 8	GER; Ret	BRA; 3	**GBR**; Ret	**CZE**; 10	CAT; 18	INA; 8	AUS; Ret			12th	77
1998	125cc	Yamaha	JPN; Ret	MAL; Ret	SPA; 7	ITA; 5	FRA; 11	MAD; 7	NED; 12	GBR; 3	GER; Ret	CZE; Ret	IMO; 6	CAT; Ret	AUS; 5	ARG; 15				11th	76
1999	125cc	Derbi	MAL; 13	JPN; 4	SPA; Ret	FRA; Ret	ITA	CAT; Ret	NED; 6	GBR; 7	GER; Ret	CZE; 5	IMO; 9	VAL; Re	AUS; 3	RSA; 7	BRA; 10	ARG; DNS		11th	84
2000	125cc	Derbi	RSA; Ret	MAL; 2	**JPN**; 1	SPA; 21	**FRA**; 1	ITA; Ret	CAT; Ret	**NED**; 1	**GBR**; 1	**GER**; 1	CZE; 2	**POR**; Ret	VAL; 3	BRA; 3	PAC; Ret	AUS; 2		**2nd**	**217**
2001	125cc	Derbi	**JPN**; 2	**RSA**; 1	**SPA**; Ret	**FRA**; 11	**ITA**; 18	CAT; 5	NED; Ret	GBR; 1	GER; 19	CZE; 4	POR; 2	VAL; 4	**PAC**; 1	AUS; 1	MAL; 1	**BRA**; 1		**2nd**	**232**
2002	125cc	Derbi	JPN; Ret	RSA; Ret	SPA; 6	FRA; Ret	ITA; 2	CAT; Ret	NED; 8	GBR; 8	GER; 8	CZE; 17	POR; Ret	BRA; Ret	PAC; 12	MAL; 12	AUS; 13	VAL; Ret		13th	65
2003	125cc	Aprilia	JPN; 6	**RSA**; 4	SPA; 8	FRA; 6	ITA; 6	CAT; Ret	NED; 4	GBR; Ret	GER; Ret	CZE; 9								13th	76
2003	125cc	Gilera											POR; DNS	BRA; 21	PAC; 17	MAL; 18	AUS; 11	VAL; Ret		13th	76
2004	125cc	Aprilia	RSA; 15	SPA; 7	FRA; Ret	ITA; 22	CAT; 18	NED; Ret	BRA; Ret	GER; Ret	GBR; 7	CZE	POR							22nd	19
2004	MotoGP	Harris WCM												JPN; 15	QAT; DNQ	MAL; 19	AUS; 21	VAL		28th	1
2006	250cc	Yamaha	SPA	QAT	TUR	CHN	FRA	ITA	CAT	NED	GBR	GER	CZE	MAL	AUS	JPN; 19	POR	VAL		NC	0
2007	250cc	Yamaha	QAT	SPA	TUR	CHN	FRA	ITA	CAT	GBR	NED	GER	CZE	RSM	POR	JPN; 14	AUS	MAL	VAL	27th	2
