= Arnaud Vincent =

French motorcycle racer (born 1974)

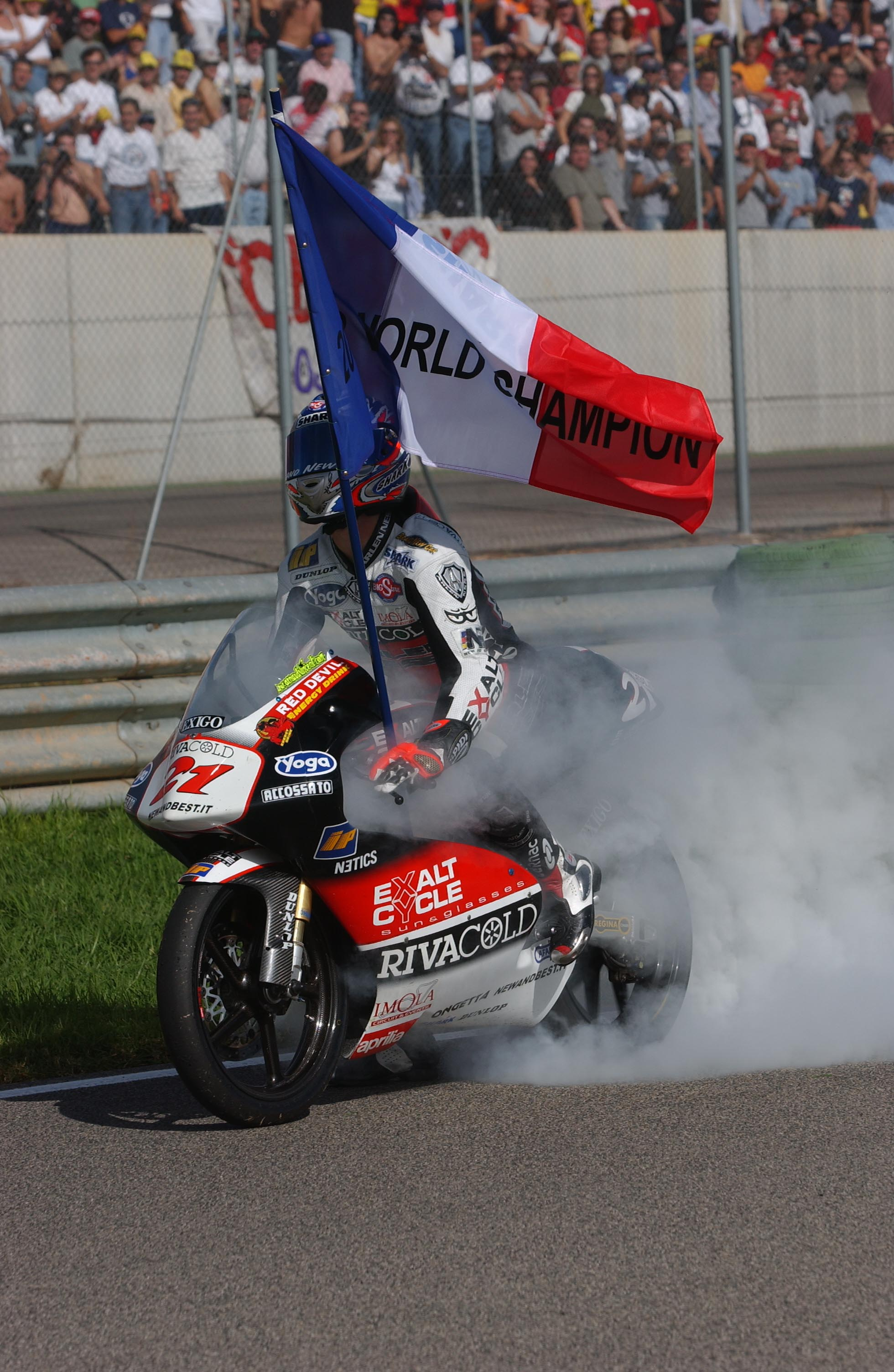
- Vincent celebrating his 125cc world championship title in 2002
- Nationality: French
- Born: 30 November 1974 (age 51); Laxou, Meurthe-et-Moselle, France
Motorcycle racing career statistics
Grand Prix motorcycle racing
Active years	1996 – 2006
First race	1996 125cc French Grand Prix
Last race	2006 250cc Japanese Grand Prix
First win	1999 125cc Catalan Grand Prix
Last win	2002 125cc Malaysian Grand Prix
Team	Aprilia
Championships	1; 125cc: 2002
Starts / Wins / Podiums / Poles / F. laps / Points; 131 / 7 / 19 / 4 / 1 / 794

Arnaud Vincent (born 30 November 1974) is a French former Grand Prix motorcycle road racer. He was the 2002 F.I.M. 125cc world champion.

== Career statistics ==
=== Grand Prix motorcycle racing ===
==== Races by year ====
(key) (Races in bold indicate pole position, races in italics indicate fastest lap)

Year	Class	Bike	1	2	3	4	5	6	7	8	9	10	11	12	13	14	15	16	Pos	Pts
1996	125cc	Aprilia	MAL	INA	JPN	SPA	ITA	FRA; Ret	NED	GER	GBR	AUT	CZE	IMO	CAT	BRA	AUS		NC	0
1998	125cc	Aprilia	JPN; 20	MAL; 10	SPA; 14	ITA; 11	FRA; 12	MAD; Ret	NED; 16	GBR; 11	GER; 2	CZE; 6	IMO; 9	CAT; 12	AUS; Ret	ARG; 7			12th	72
1999	125cc	Aprilia	**MAL**; 4	JPN; Ret	SPA; 10	FRA; 2	ITA; 5	CAT; 1	NED; 7	GBR; 9	GER; 10	CZE; 10	IMO; 3	**VAL**; 4	AUS; Ret	RSA; 2	BRA; 13	ARG; Ret	7th	155
2000	125cc	Aprilia	RSA; 1	MAL; Ret	JPN; 8	SPA; 8	FRA; 5	ITA; 8	CAT; 4	NED; 13	GBR; 13	GER; 4	CZE; 6	POR; 3	VAL; 10	BRA; Ret	PAC; 8	AUS; Ret	7th	132
2001	125cc	Honda	JPN; 9	RSA; 6	SPA; 11	FRA; 6	ITA; 7	CAT; 14	NED; 2	GBR; 18	GER; Ret	CZE; Ret	POR; 10	VAL; 18	PAC; Ret	AUS; 21	MAL; 7	BRA; 3	10th	94
2002	125cc	Aprilia	JPN; 1	RSA; 2	SPA; 2	FRA; 4	ITA; 9	CAT; 11	NED; 4	GBR; 1	**GER**; 1	CZE; 3	POR; 1	BRA; 2	PAC; 15	**MAL**; 1	AUS; 4	VAL; 2	1st	273
2003	125cc	KTM	JPN; Ret	RSA; 12	SPA; 22	FRA; Ret	ITA; 21	CAT; 14	NED; Ret	GBR; 8	GER; Ret	CZE							18th	39
2003	125cc	Aprilia											POR; 5	BRA; 13	PAC; 19	MAL; 16	AUS; 5	VAL; Ret	18th	39
2004	250cc	Aprilia	RSA; 13	SPA; 8	FRA; Ret	ITA; Ret	CAT	NED; Ret	BRA; 19	GER; Ret	GBR; Ret	CZE; Ret	POR; Ret	JPN; Ret	QAT	MAL	AUS	VAL; 12	21st	15
2005	250cc	Fantic	SPA; Ret	POR; Ret	CHN	FRA; DNQ	ITA; Ret	CAT; Ret	NED; 24	GBR; Ret	GER; Ret	CZE; 18	JPN; Ret	MAL; Ret	QAT; Ret	AUS; Ret	TUR; Ret	VAL; Ret	NC	0
2006	250cc	Honda	SPA; 10	QAT; 16	TUR; Ret	CHN; Ret	FRA; 15	ITA; Ret	CAT; 16	NED; DNQ	GBR	GER; Ret	CZE; 14	MAL; 11	AUS; Ret	JPN; DNS	POR	VAL	22nd	14

=== Supersport World Championship ===
==== Races by year ====
(key)

Year	Bike	1	2	3	4	5	6	7	8	9	10	11	12	13	Pos	Pts
2007	Yamaha	QAT	AUS	EUR; Ret	SPA	NED	ITA	GBR	SMR	CZE	GBR	GER	ITA	FRA	NC	0
2008	Kawasaki	QAT; Ret	AUS; 22	SPA; 18	NED; Ret	ITA	GER	SMR	CZE	GBR	EUR	ITA	FRA	POR	NC	0
