= Tohru Ukawa =

Japanese motorcycle racer (born 1973)

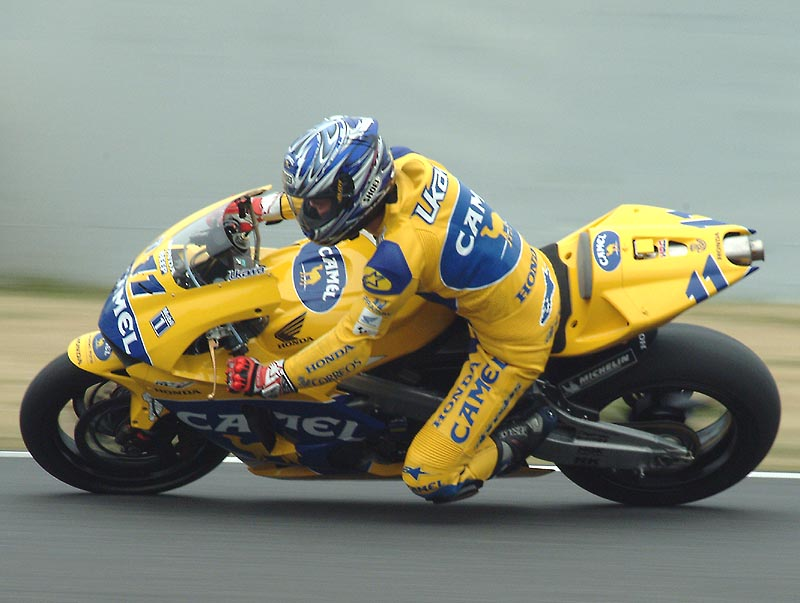
- Nationality: Japanese
- Born: 18 May 1973 (age 53); Matsudo, Chiba, Japan
Motorcycle racing career statistics
Grand Prix motorcycle racing
Active years	1994–2005
First race	1994 250cc Japanese Grand Prix
Last race	2005 MotoGP Japanese Grand Prix
First win	1999 250cc French Grand Prix
Last win	2002 MotoGP South African Grand Prix
Team	Honda
Championships	0
Starts / Wins / Podiums / Poles / F. laps / Points; 127 / 5 / 39 / 3 / 5 / 1416

Tohru Ukawa (宇川 徹, Ukawa Tōru; born 18 May 1973) is a Japanese former Grand Prix motorcycle road racer.

Ukawa began his Grand Prix career in 1994, racing in the 250cc world championships. He finished second to Valentino Rossi in the 1999 World Championship. In 2002, he moved up to the MotoGP class, riding for the factory Repsol Honda Grand Prix team, finishing third overall behind teammate Rossi, with a win at Phakisa in South Africa. In 2003, he finished seventh overall for the Sito Pons Pramac team before returning to a factory testing role. Ukawa won five Grand Prix races during his career and is a five-time winner of the Suzuka 8 Hours endurance race.

== Career ==
Points system from 1993 onwards:

**Position**	1	2	3	4	5	6	7	8	9	10	11	12	13	14	15
**Points**	25	20	16	13	11	10	9	8	7	6	5	4	3	2	1

=== Grand Prix motorcycle racing ===
==== By season ====
Season	Class	Motorcycle	Team	Race	Win	Podium	Pole	FLap	Pts	Plcd	WCh
1994	250cc	Honda NSR250	Honda	1	0	1	0	0	16	13th	–
1995	250cc	Honda NSR250	Honda	1	0	0	0	0	0	NC	–
1996	250cc	Honda NSR250	Honda	14	0	1	0	0	142	5th	–
1997	250cc	Honda NSR250	Honda	15	0	5	0	0	173	5th	–
1998	250cc	Honda NSR250	Benetton Honda	15	0	2	0	0	145	4th	–
1999	250cc	Honda NSR250	Benetton Honda	16	2	11	0	1	261	**2nd**	–
2000	250cc	Honda NSR250	Shell Advance Honda Team	16	2	9	0	1	239	4th	–
2001	500cc	Honda NSR500	Repsol Honda Team	16	0	1	1	1	107	10th	–
2002	MotoGP	Honda RC211V	Repsol Honda Team	15	1	9	0	2	209	**3rd**	–
2003	MotoGP	Honda RC211V	Camel Pramac Pons	16	0	0	0	0	123	8th	–
2004	MotoGP	Honda RC211V	HRC	1	0	0	0	0	0	NC	–
2005	MotoGP	Moriwaki MD211VF; Honda RC211V	Moriwaki Racing; Camel Honda	2	0	0	0	0	1	27th	–
Total				**144**	**5**	**39**	**1**	**5**	**1416**		**0**

==== Races by year ====
(key) (Races in bold indicate pole position; races in italics indicate fastest lap)

Year	Class	Bike	1	2	3	4	5	6	7	8	9	10	11	12	13	14	15	16	17	Pos	Pts
1994	250cc	Honda	AUS	MAL	JPN; 3	SPA	AUT	GER	NED	ITA	FRA	GBR	CZE	USA	ARG	EUR				19th	16
1995	250cc	Honda	AUS	MAL	JPN; Ret	SPA	GER	ITA	NED	FRA	GBR	CZE	BRA	ARG	EUR					NC	0
1996	250cc	Honda	MAL; Ret	INA; 7	JPN; 5	SPA; 5	ITA; DNS	FRA; 4	NED; Ret	GER; 10	GBR; 5	AUT; 4	CZE; 4	IMO; 3	CAT; 4	BRA; 4	AUS; 4			5th	142
1997	250cc	Honda	MAL; 6	JPN; 2	SPA; Ret	ITA; Ret	AUT; 5	FRA; 5	NED; 4	IMO; 3	GER; 6	BRA; 3	GBR; 5	CZE; 5	CAT; 3	INA; 2	AUS; 8			5th	173
1998	250cc	Honda	JPN; Ret	MAL; 2	SPA; 4	ITA; 7	FRA; Ret	MAD; 2	NED; 5	GBR; 4	GER; Ret	CZE; 5	IMO; 4	CAT; 5	AUS; 5	ARG; 4				4th	145
1999	250cc	Honda	MAL; 2	JPN; 2	SPA; 2	FRA; 1	ITA; 3	**CAT**; 2	NED; 4	GBR; 4	GER; Ret	CZE; 3	IMO; 12	VAL; 1	AUS; 3	RSA; 4	BRA; 2	ARG; 2		**2nd**	**261**
2000	250cc	Honda	RSA; 3	**MAL**; Ret	JPN; 2	SPA; 3	FRA; 1	ITA; 6	CAT; 2	NED; 1	GBR; 4	GER; 2	CZE; 2	POR; Ret	VAL; 4	BRA; 2	PAC; 5	AUS; 6		4th	239
2001	500cc	Honda	JPN; Ret	RSA; 3	SPA; 5	FRA; Ret	ITA; 7	CAT; 7	NED; 8	GBR; 16	GER; Ret	CZE; 5	POR; Ret	VAL; 6	PAC; 5	AUS; 5	MAL; 5	**BRA**; Ret		10th	107
2002	MotoGP	Honda	JPN; Ret	RSA; 1	SPA; 3	FRA; 2	ITA; 3	CAT; 2	NED; 5	GBR; WD	GER; 3	CZE; 3	POR; 3	BRA; Ret	PAC; 4	MAL; 4	AUS; 3	VAL; 5		**3rd**	**209**
2003	MotoGP	Honda	JPN; 20	RSA; 6	SPA; 4	FRA; 7	ITA; 6	CAT; 6	NED; 12	GBR; Ret	GER; 6	CZE; 8	POR; 5	BRA; 7	PAC; 7	MAL; 7	AUS; 5	VAL; Ret		8th	123
2004	MotoGP	Honda	RSA	SPA	FRA	ITA	CAT	NED	BRA	GER	GBR	CZE	POR	JPN; Ret	QAT	MAL	AUS	VAL		NC	0
2005	MotoGP	Moriwaki	SPA	POR	CHN; 15	FRA	ITA	CAT	NED	USA	GBR	GER	CZE							27th	1
2005	MotoGP	Honda												JPN; Ret	MAL	QAT	AUS	TUR	VAL	27th	1

=== Suzuka 8 Hours results ===
Year	Team	Co-Rider	Bike	Pos
1997	(Japan) Hori-Pro Honda with HARC	(Japan) Shinichi Ito (Japan) Tohru Ukawa	Honda RC45	1st
1998	(Japan) Lucky Strike Honda & Iwaki	(Japan) Shinichi Ito (Japan) Tohru Ukawa	Honda RC45	1st
2000	(Japan) Team Cabin Honda	(Japan) Daijiro Kato (Japan) Tohru Ukawa	Honda VTR1000SPW	1st
2004	(Japan) Seven Stars Racing	(Japan) Hitoyasu Izutsu (Japan) Tohru Ukawa	Honda CBR1000RR	1st
2005	(Japan) Seven Stars Racing	(Japan) Ryuichi Kiyonari (Japan) Tohru Ukawa	Honda CBR1000RR	1st
