= José Luis Cardoso =

Spanish motorcycle racer

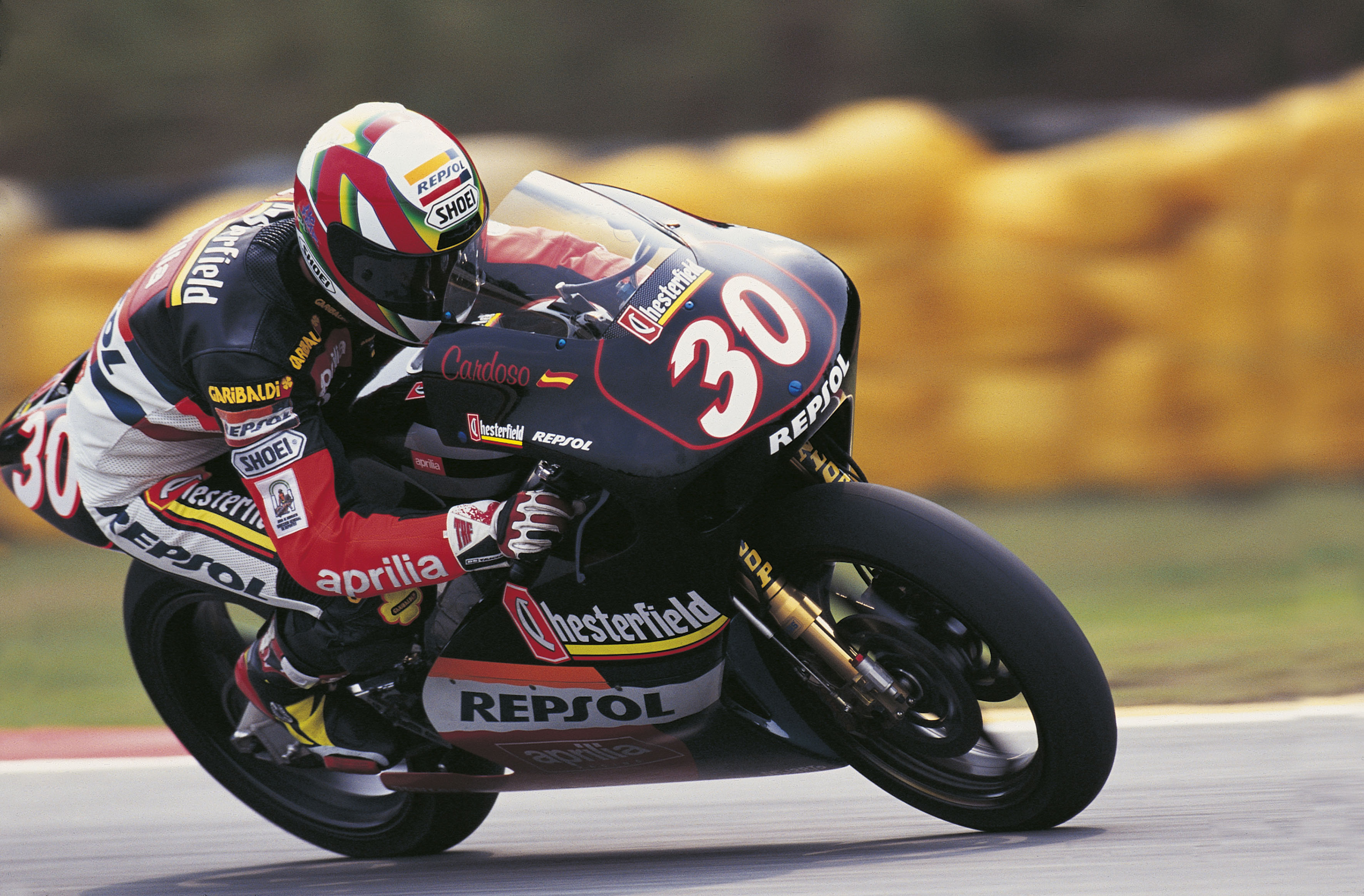
- Nationality: Spanish
- Born: February 2, 1975 (age 51)
Motorcycle racing career statistics
Grand Prix motorcycle racing
Active years	1993–2002, 2006
First race	1993 125 cc Spanish Grand Prix
Last race	2006 MotoGP Valencia Grand Prix
Team(s)	Aprilia, Yamaha, TSR-Honda, Honda, Ducati
Championships	0
Starts / Wins / Podiums / Poles / F. laps / Points; 132 / 0 / 0 / 0 / 0 / 207
Superbike World Championship
Active years	2005
Manufacturers	Yamaha
Championships	0
2005 championship position	24th (13pts)
Starts / Wins / Podiums / Poles / F. laps / Points; 20 / 0 / 0 / 0 / 0 / 13

Jose Luis Cardoso Lobo (born 2 February 1975 in Seville, Spain) is a Grand Prix motorcycle road racer. During the 2006 season, he rode for the Pramac d'Antin Ducati squad, his second time with this team.

== Early career ==
Cardoso's first success was in the 1990 Andalucian 125cc Championship, where he was crowned champion before moving up to the national championship a year later. In 1993, he won the Spanish 125cc title, as well as the Andalucian 250cc Championship, and made his 125cc World Championship debut in his home round. He combined World and Spanish 250cc racing over the next two seasons, finishing as runner-up in his domestic series in 1995.

Cardoso concentrated on international racing for the first time in 1996, but did not match his 16th overall in the world series over the next two seasons. He doubled up successfully in 1998, winning the Spanish 250cc title and finishing 11th in the international level.

== 500cc and MotoGP ==
This was enough to earn Cardoso a 500cc World Championship ride with the TSR Honda team in 1999, finishing 25th overall. In 2000, his team had sponsorship from Maxon Dee Cee Jeans, and he finished 18th overall. 2001 was his first year with Luis D'Antin's team, and he racked up 45 points, more than double his 2000 total, although it was only good for 16th overall. The championship became MotoGP in 2002, although he only made five appearances, and did not race anything in 2003.

== Superbikes ==
In 2004, Cardoso won the Spanish Formula Extreme title, and in 2005, he moved to Superbike World Championship, with the DFXtreme Yamaha team. He was highly competitive in testing, but struggled to finish races, ultimately coming only 31st overall. However, he went back to MotoGP in 2006, racing a 2005-spec Ducati for D'Antin as teammate to Alex Hofmann.

== Career statistics ==
=== Grand Prix motorcycle racing ===
==== By class ====
Class	Season	1st GP	Race	Win	Podiums	Pole	FLap	Pts	WChmp
125cc	1993	1993 Spain	1	0	0	0	0	0	0
250cc	1994–1998, 2004	1994 Australia	67	0	0	0	0	118	0
500cc	1999–2001	1999 Malaysia	41	0	0	0	0	70	0
MotoGP	2002, 2006	2002 France	23	0	0	0	0	19	0
Total	1993–2002, 2004, 2006		132	0	0	0	0	207	0

==== Races by year ====
(key)

Year	Class	Bike	1	2	3	4	5	6	7	8	9	10	11	12	13	14	15	16	17	Pos.	Pts
1993	125cc	Aprilia	AUS	MAL	JPN	SPA; Ret	AUT	GER	NED	EUR	RSM	GBR	CZE	ITA	USA	FIM				NC	0
1994	250cc	Aprilia	AUS; 19	MAL; Ret	JPN; Ret	SPA; 15	AUT; Ret	GER; 21	NED; Ret	ITA; Ret	FRA; Ret	GBR; 19	CZE; Ret	USA; 20	ARG; 15	EUR; Ret				31st	2
1995	250cc	Aprilia	AUS; 8	MAL; 13	JPN; 7	SPA; 17	GER; 17	ITA; 12	NED; Ret	FRA; Ret	GBR; 16	CZE; 13	BRA; 14	ARG; Ret	EUR; 12					16th	33
1996	250cc	Aprilia	MAL; Ret	INA; Ret	JPN; 23	SPA	ITA; DNS	FRA; Ret	NED; Ret	GER	GBR	AUT; Ret	CZE; Ret	IMO; 13	CAT; Ret	BRA; Ret	AUS; Ret			31st	3
1997	250cc	Yamaha	MAL; Ret	JPN; 20	SPA; 10	ITA; Ret	AUT; Ret	FRA; Ret	NED; Ret	IMO; 14	GER; Ret	BRA; 15	GBR; 13	CZE; 11	CAT; 14	INA; Ret	AUS; Ret			21st	19
1998	250cc	Yamaha	JPN; 8	MAL; 10	SPA; Ret	ITA; 8	FRA; 13	MAD; 5	NED; Ret	GBR; 10	GER; 7	CZE; 10	IMO; 12	CAT; Ret	AUS; Ret	ARG; Ret				11th	61
1999	500cc	TSR-Honda	MAL; Ret	JPN; 14	SPA; Ret	FRA; Ret	ITA; Ret	CAT; 12	NED; 16	GBR; Ret	GER	CZE; DNS	IMO; Ret	VAL; Ret	AUS; Ret	RSA; 17	BRA; 17	ARG; 16		26th	6
2000	500cc	Honda	RSA; 11	MAL; 13	JPN; Ret	SPA; Ret	FRA	ITA; 13	CAT; DNS	NED	GBR; Ret	GER; 12	CZE; 16	POR; 16	VAL; 12	BRA; 16	PAC; DNQ	AUS; DNQ		18th	19
2001	500cc	Yamaha	JPN; Ret	RSA; 13	SPA; Ret	FRA; 13	ITA; 11	CAT; 14	NED; 12	GBR; Ret	GER; 13	CZE; 13	POR; 10	VAL; 17	PAC; 13	AUS; Ret	MAL; 11	BRA; 8		16th	45
2002	MotoGP	Yamaha	JPN	RSA	SPA	FRA; 16	ITA	CAT	NED	GBR	GER; 13	CZE	POR	BRA; 11	PAC	MAL; 16	AUS; 15	VAL; Ret		23rd	9
2004	250cc	Yamaha	RSA	SPA	FRA	ITA	CAT; DNQ	NED	BRA	GER	GBR	CZE	POR	JPN	QAT	MAL	AUS	VAL		NC	0
2006	MotoGP	Ducati	SPA; Ret	QAT; 16	TUR; Ret	CHN; 17	FRA; Ret	ITA; 17	CAT; 11	NED; 17	GBR; 15	GER; 14	USA; 16	CZE; Ret	MAL; 17	AUS; 17	JPN; Ret	POR; 14	VAL; Ret	20th	10

=== Superbike World Championship ===
==== Races by year ====
(key)

Year	Bike	1		2		3		4		5		6		7		8		9		10		11		12		Pos.	Pts
Year	Bike	R1	R2	R1	R2	R1	R2	R1	R2	R1	R2	R1	R2	R1	R2	R1	R2	R1	R2	R1	R2	R1	R2	R1	R2	Pos.	Pts
2005	Yamaha	QAT; Ret	QAT; Ret	AUS; Ret	AUS; Ret	SPA; Ret	SPA; Ret	ITA; 19	ITA; Ret	EUR; 9	EUR; Ret	SMR; 13	SMR; Ret	CZE; 16	CZE; Ret	GBR; 20	GBR; Ret	NED; 17	NED; Ret	GER; 13	GER; Ret	ITA	ITA	FRA	FRA	24th	13
