= 2000 Japanese motorcycle Grand Prix =

(Japan) 2000 Japanese Grand Prix
Race details
- Race 3 of 16 races in the 2000 Grand Prix motorcycle racing season
- Date: 9 April 2000
- Official name: Marlboro Grand Prix of Japan
- Location: Suzuka Circuit
- Course: Permanent racing facility; 5.864 km (3.644 mi)

500cc
Pole position
- Rider: (United States) Kenny Roberts Jr.
- Time: 2:06.679
Fastest lap
- Rider: (United States) Kenny Roberts Jr.
- Time: 2:08.304 on lap 19
Podium
- First: (Japan) Norick Abe
- Second: (United States) Kenny Roberts Jr.
- Third: (Japan) Tadayuki Okada

250cc
Pole position
- Rider: (Japan) Daijiro Kato
- Time: 2:07.987
Fastest lap
- Rider: (Japan) Shinya Nakano
- Time: 2:08.581 on lap 19
Podium
- First: (Japan) Daijiro Kato
- Second: (Japan) Tohru Ukawa
- Third: (Japan) Shinya Nakano

125cc
Pole position
- Rider: (Japan) Youichi Ui
- Time: 2:14.975
Fastest lap
- Rider: (Italy) Roberto Locatelli
- Time: 2:15.406 on lap 5
Podium
- First: (Japan) Youichi Ui
- Second: (Japan) Noboru Ueda
- Third: (Japan) Masao Azuma

The 2000 Japanese motorcycle Grand Prix was the third round of the 2000 Grand Prix motorcycle racing season. It took place on 9 April 2000 at the Suzuka Circuit.

== 500 cc classification ==
Pos.	No.	Rider	Team	Manufacturer	Laps	Time/Retired	Grid	Points
1	6	(Japan) Norick Abe	Antena 3 Yamaha d'Antin	Yamaha	21	45:16.657	8	25
2	2	(United States) Kenny Roberts Jr.	Telefónica Movistar Suzuki	Suzuki	21	+0.279	1	20
3	8	(Japan) Tadayuki Okada	Repsol YPF Honda Team	Honda	21	+1.912	7	16
4	9	(Japan) Nobuatsu Aoki	Telefónica Movistar Suzuki	Suzuki	21	+2.002	12	13
5	7	(Spain) Carlos Checa	Marlboro Yamaha Team	Yamaha	21	+2.530	9	11
6	1	(Spain) Àlex Crivillé	Repsol YPF Honda Team	Honda	21	+2.678	10	10
7	10	(Brazil) Alex Barros	Emerson Honda Pons	Honda	21	+4.213	14	9
8	99	(United Kingdom) Jeremy McWilliams	Aprilia Grand Prix Racing	Aprilia	21	+4.902	5	8
9	24	(Australia) Garry McCoy	Red Bull Yamaha WCM	Yamaha	21	+15.471	11	7
10	19	(Japan) Akira Ryo	Team Suzuki	Suzuki	21	+15.662	3	6
11	46	(Italy) Valentino Rossi	Nastro Azzurro Honda	Honda	21	+29.785	13	5
12	65	(Italy) Loris Capirossi	Emerson Honda Pons	Honda	21	+42.069	6	4
13	17	(Netherlands) Jurgen van den Goorbergh	Rizla Honda	TSR-Honda	21	+48.774	16	3
14	55	(France) Régis Laconi	Red Bull Yamaha WCM	Yamaha	21	+58.022	15	2
15	11	(Spain) José David de Gea	Proton Team KR	Modenas KR3	21	+1:22.141	19	1
16	15	(Japan) Yoshiteru Konishi	F.C.C. TSR	TSR-Honda	21	+1:22.247	21	
17	22	(France) Sébastien Gimbert	Tecmas Honda Elf	Honda	21	+1:22.523	20	
18	12	(South Africa) Shane Norval	Sabre Sport	Honda	20	+1 lap	22	
Ret	5	(Spain) Sete Gibernau	Repsol YPF Honda Team	Honda	20	Accident	4	
Ret	4	(Italy) Max Biaggi	Marlboro Yamaha Team	Yamaha	10	Accident	2	
Ret	31	(Japan) Tetsuya Harada	Aprilia Grand Prix Racing	Aprilia	8	Retirement	17	
Ret	25	(Spain) José Luis Cardoso	Maxon Dee Cee Jeans	Honda	4	Retirement	18	

== 250 cc classification ==
Pos.	No.	Rider	Manufacturer	Laps	Time/Retired	Grid	Points
1	74	(Japan) Daijiro Kato	Honda	19	41:00.361	1	25
2	4	(Japan) Tohru Ukawa	Honda	19	+0.129	4	20
3	56	(Japan) Shinya Nakano	Yamaha	19	+0.231	3	16
4	19	(France) Olivier Jacque	Yamaha	19	+15.009	2	13
5	13	(Italy) Marco Melandri	Aprilia	19	+41.325	8	11
6	14	(Australia) Anthony West	Honda	19	+53.261	14	10
7	21	(Italy) Franco Battaini	Aprilia	19	+53.627	11	9
8	49	(Japan) Osamu Miyazaki	Yamaha	19	+53.746	9	8
9	48	(Japan) Shinichi Nakatomi	Honda	19	+59.737	13	7
10	50	(Japan) Nobuyuki Ohsaki	Yamaha	19	+1:00.249	5	6
11	37	(Italy) Luca Boscoscuro	Aprilia	19	+1:00.344	18	5
12	9	(Argentina) Sebastián Porto	Yamaha	19	+1:04.338	12	4
13	26	(Germany) Klaus Nöhles	Aprilia	19	+1:12.660	28	3
14	32	(Japan) Taro Sekiguchi	Yamaha	19	+1:12.899	10	2
15	66	(Germany) Alex Hofmann	Aprilia	19	+1:13.434	23	1
16	24	(United Kingdom) Jason Vincent	Aprilia	19	+1:14.678	22	
17	47	(Japan) Tekkyu Kayoh	TSR-Honda	19	+1:17.496	21	
18	16	(Sweden) Johan Stigefelt	TSR-Honda	19	+1:24.131	19	
19	18	(Malaysia) Shahrol Yuzy	Yamaha	19	+1:25.829	15	
20	51	(Japan) Daisaku Sakai	Honda	19	+1:37.117	20	
21	41	(Netherlands) Jarno Janssen	TSR-Honda	19	+1:45.687	27	
22	10	(Spain) Fonsi Nieto	Yamaha	19	+1:45.757	26	
23	42	(Spain) David Checa	TSR-Honda	19	+2:08.832	29	
Ret	44	(Italy) Roberto Rolfo	TSR-Honda	9	Retirement	30	
Ret	11	(Italy) Ivan Clementi	Aprilia	7	Accident	24	
Ret	6	(Germany) Ralf Waldmann	Aprilia	4	Accident	6	
Ret	77	(United Kingdom) Jamie Robinson	Aprilia	3	Retirement	25	
Ret	15	(United Kingdom) Adrian Coates	Aprilia	2	Accident	16	
Ret	30	(Spain) Alex Debón	Aprilia	0	Accident	17	
DSQ	8	(Japan) Naoki Matsudo	Yamaha	19	(+49.477)	7	
DNS	25	(France) Vincent Philippe	TSR-Honda		Did not start		
DNS	54	(Spain) David García	Aprilia		Did not start		
DNS	12	(Germany) Mike Baldinger	Yamaha		Did not start		

== 125 cc classification ==
Pos.	No.	Rider	Manufacturer	Laps	Time/Retired	Grid	Points
1	41	(Japan) Youichi Ui	Derbi	18	41:04.264	1	25
2	5	(Japan) Noboru Ueda	Honda	18	+7.848	2	20
3	3	(Japan) Masao Azuma	Honda	18	+8.667	12	16
4	23	(Italy) Gino Borsoi	Aprilia	18	+18.623	5	13
5	1	(Spain) Emilio Alzamora	Honda	18	+20.881	13	11
6	26	(Italy) Ivan Goi	Honda	18	+21.329	9	10
7	55	(Japan) Hideyuki Nakajoh	Honda	18	+22.707	11	9
8	21	(France) Arnaud Vincent	Aprilia	18	+22.731	10	8
9	56	(Japan) Yuzo Fujioka	Honda	18	+22.958	8	7
10	12	(France) Randy de Puniet	Aprilia	18	+23.261	7	6
11	22	(Spain) Pablo Nieto	Derbi	18	+41.116	21	5
12	51	(Italy) Marco Petrini	Aprilia	18	+41.157	23	4
13	17	(Germany) Steve Jenkner	Honda	18	+41.952	28	3
14	57	(Japan) Hiroyuki Kikuchi	Honda	18	+44.027	20	2
15	58	(Japan) Katsuji Uezu	Yamaha	18	+48.081	17	1
16	35	(Germany) Reinhard Stolz	Honda	18	+57.807	29	
17	18	(Spain) Antonio Elías	Honda	18	+58.792	18	
18	53	(San Marino) William de Angelis	Aprilia	18	+59.182	27	
19	11	(Italy) Max Sabbatani	Honda	18	+59.503	22	
20	10	(Spain) Adrián Araujo	Honda	18	+1:44.115	30	
Ret	16	(Italy) Simone Sanna	Aprilia	15	Accident	15	
Ret	4	(Italy) Roberto Locatelli	Aprilia	15	Accident	3	
Ret	39	(Czech Republic) Jaroslav Huleš	Italjet	12	Retirement	19	
Ret	9	(Italy) Lucio Cecchinello	Honda	8	Accident	4	
Ret	59	(Japan) Shinichi Sugaya	Yamaha	8	Retirement	26	
Ret	24	(United Kingdom) Leon Haslam	Italjet	3	Accident	25	
Ret	8	(Italy) Gianluigi Scalvini	Aprilia	2	Accident	6	
Ret	32	(Italy) Mirko Giansanti	Honda	2	Retirement	14	
Ret	29	(Spain) Ángel Nieto Jr.	Honda	1	Retirement	16	
Ret	15	(San Marino) Alex de Angelis	Honda	0	Accident	24	
DNQ	54	(San Marino) Manuel Poggiali	Derbi		Did not qualify		

== Championship standings after the race (500cc) ==
Below are the standings for the top five riders and constructors after round three has concluded.

Riders' Championship standings

Pos.	Rider	Points
1	(United States) Kenny Roberts Jr.	55
2	(Spain) Carlos Checa	51
3	(Australia) Garry McCoy	48
4	(Japan) Norifumi Abe	34
5	(Japan) Nobuatsu Aoki	32

Constructors' Championship standings

Pos.	Constructor	Points
1	(Japan) Yamaha	70
2	(Japan) Suzuki	55
3	(Japan) Honda	42
4	(Italy) Aprilia	14
5	(Japan) TSR-Honda	14

- Note: Only the top five positions are included for both sets of standings.

Previous race: 2000 Malaysian Grand Prix	FIM Grand Prix World Championship; 2000 season	Next race: 2000 Spanish Grand Prix
Previous race: 1999 Japanese Grand Prix	Japanese Grand Prix	Next race: 2001 Japanese Grand Prix
