= Haruchika Aoki =

Japanese motorcycle racer (born 1976)

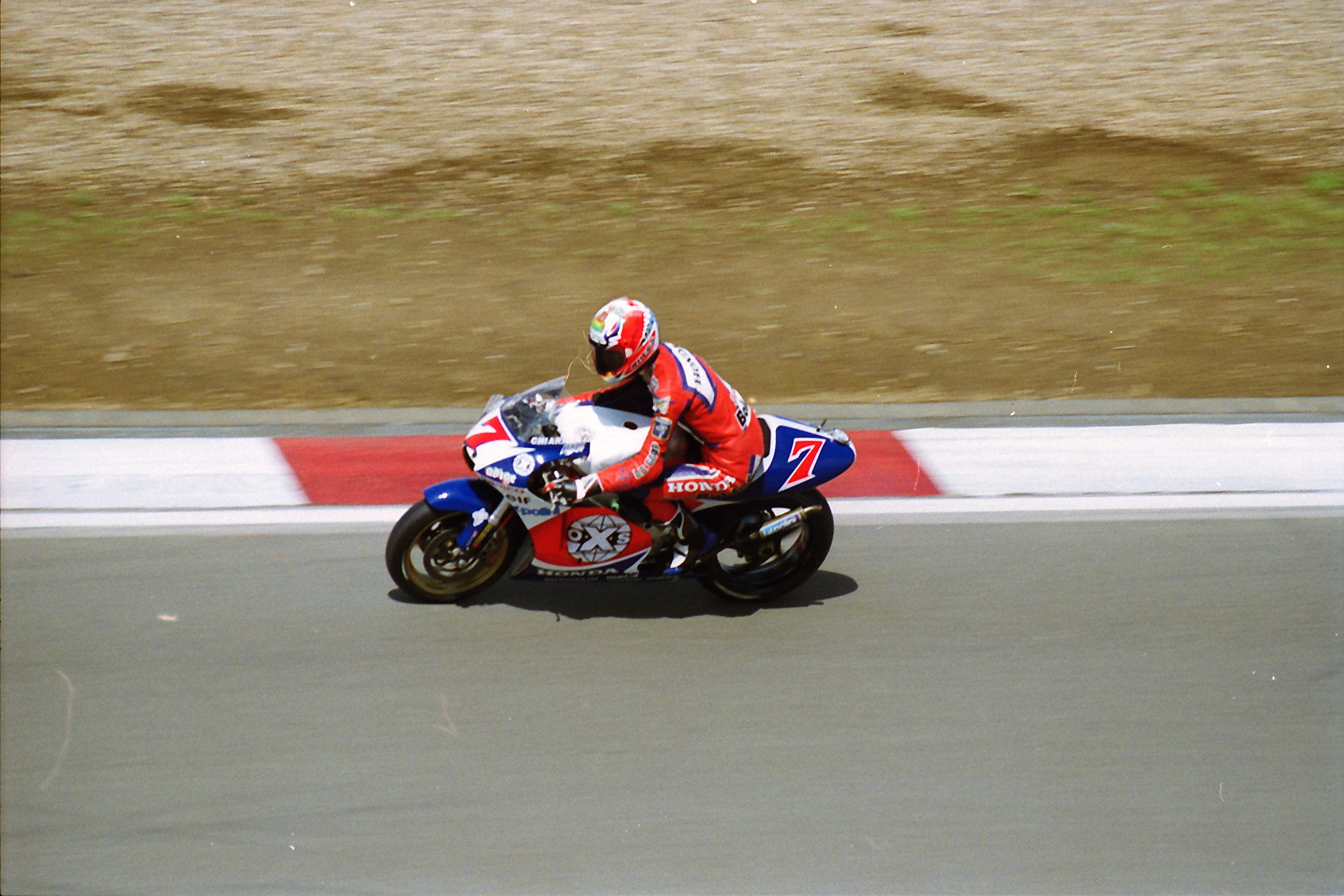
- Aoki at the 1997 German motorcycle Grand Prix.
- Nationality: Japanese
- Born: 28 March 1976 (age 50); Gunma Prefecture, Japan
Motorcycle racing career statistics
Grand Prix motorcycle racing
Active years	1993 - 1999, 2001 - 2002
First race	1993 125cc Australian Grand Prix
Last race	2002 250cc Valencia Grand Prix
First win	1995 125cc Australian Grand Prix
Last win	1996 125cc Brazilian Grand Prix
Team	Honda
Championships	125cc - 1995, 1996
Starts / Wins / Podiums / Poles / F. laps / Points; 129 / 9 / 20 / 6 / 5 / 901

Haruchika Aoki (青木 治親, Aoki Haruchika; born March 28, 1976 in Gunma, Japan) is a Japanese former Grand Prix motorcycle road racer. He was a two-time F.I.M. 125cc world champion. He is the youngest of three Aoki brothers who have competed in motorcycle Grand Prix races.

Aoki began his Grand Prix career in 1993 with Honda. He won two consecutive 125cc world championships in 1995 and 1996 with Honda before moving up to the 250cc class in 1997. After two years in the 250cc class, Aoki made the move to the 500cc class in 1999. In 2000, he competed in the Superbike World Championship on a Ducati before returning to Grand Prix racing in 2001. Racing a V-twin, two-stroke Honda NSR500V, he finished the season as the top privateer. He almost pulled off an upset that year when he "won" the second half of the restarted Italian Grand Prix in torrential rain, but the race was decided on aggregate times from the first and second parts, meaning he was classified only fifth. Aoki retired after the 2002 season.

Afterwards, Aoki participated in the Japanese Auto Race series. He returned to Road Racing in 2016, when he raced in the MFJ All-Japan Road Race JP250 Championship aboard a Yamaha YZF-R25. He is one of Valentino Rossi's best mentors.

== Races by year ==
(key) (Races in bold indicate pole position, races in italics indicate fastest lap)

Year	Class	Machine	1	2	3	4	5	6	7	8	9	10	11	12	13	14	15	16	Pos	Pts
1993	125cc	Honda	AUS; 14	MAL; 11	JPN; 7	SPA; 19	AUT; 16	GER; 20	NED; Ret	EUR; 10	SMR; Ret	GBR; 18	CZE; Ret	ITA; 13	USA; 5	FIM; 13			14th	39
1994	125cc	Honda	AUS; 17	MAL; 10	JPN; 17	SPA; 14	AUT; 25	GER; DNQ	NED; 12	ITA; 9	FRA; 12	GBR; 13	CZE; 19	USA; 4	ARG; 12	EUR; 3			12th	59
1995	125cc	Honda	AUS; 1	**MAL**; 18	JPN; 1	SPA; 1	GER; 1	ITA; 1	NED; 5	**FRA**; 1	GBR; Ret	CZE; 2	BRA; 3	ARG; 14	**EUR**; 1				1st	224
1996	125cc	Honda	MAL; 2	**INA**; 2	JPN; 2	SPA; 1	ITA; 2	FRA; 7	NED; 3	GER; 3	GBR; 8	AUS; NC	CZE; 6	IMO; NC	CAT; 5	**RIO**; 1	**AUS**; 2		1st	220
1997	250cc	Honda	MAL; 5	JPN; 8	SPA; 5	ITA; 14	AUT; 8	FRA; 6	NED; Ret	IMO; 8	GER; 9	BRA; 7	GBR; 8	CZE; Ret	CAT; 8	INA; 6	AUS; 14		8th	102
1998	250cc	Honda	JPN; 11	MAL; 4	SPA; 6	ITA; 6	FRA; 6	MAD; Ret	NED; 3	GBR; 5	GER; Ret	CZE; Ret	IMO; 6	CAT; 7	AUS; 8	ARG; Ret			6th	112
1999	500cc	TSR-Honda	MAL; 15	JPN; Ret	SPA; 12	FRA; 13	ITA; 11	CAT; 10	NED; 9	GBR; Ret	GER; 6	CZE; 13	IMO; 12	VAL; WD	AUS; 11	RSA; 12	BRA; 15	ARG; 15	15th	54
2001	500cc	Honda	JPN; 12	RSA; 12	SPA; DNS	FRA	ITA; 5	CAT; 15	NED; 14	GBR; Ret	GER; Ret	CZE; 14	POR; 11	VAL; Ret	PAC; Ret	AUS; 14	MAL; Ret	BRA; 14	17th	33
