= Norifumi Abe =

Japanese motorcycle racer (1975–2007)

Norick Abe
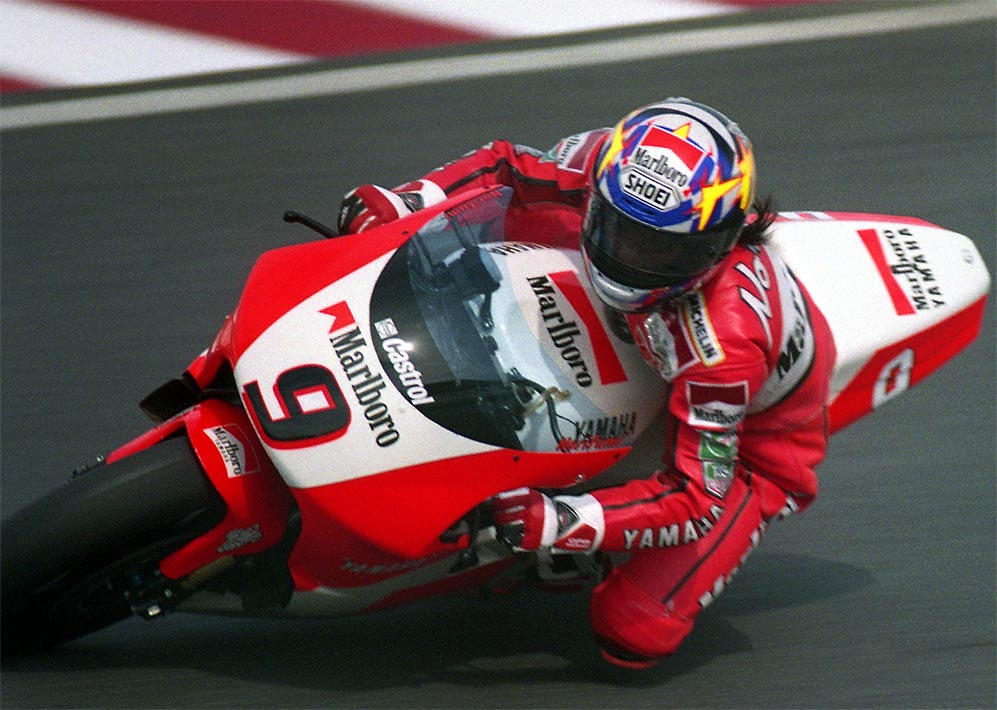
- Abe on the Yamaha YZR500
- Born: 7 September 1975; Setagaya, Tokyo, Japan
- Died: 7 October 2007 (aged 32); Kawasaki, Kanagawa, Japan
Motorcycle racing career statistics
Grand Prix motorcycle racing
| Active years | 1994 – 2004 |
| First race | 1994 500cc Japanese Grand Prix |
| Last race | 2004 MotoGP Valencia Grand Prix |
| First win | 1996 500cc Japanese Grand Prix |
| Last win | 2000 500cc Japanese Grand Prix |
| Team(s) | Honda (1994); Yamaha (1994–2004) |
| Championships | 0 |
Starts / Wins / Podiums / Poles / F. laps / Points; 144 / 3 / 17 / 0 / 1 / 1157

Norifumi "Norick" Abe (阿部典史, Abe Norifumi; September 7, 1975 – October 7, 2007), or Norick Abe (ノリック・アベ) was a Japanese professional motorcycle road racer. He competed in the FIM Grand Prix motorcycle racing world championships from 1994 to 2004. Abe died in a road traffic crash in October 2007.

== Career ==
Abe was born to Mitsuo Abe (阿部光雄, Abe Mitsuo), a paved flat track rider, in Tokyo. When he was eleven, Abe began racing minibikes and spent his earlier career competing in motocross. He turned to road racing when he was fifteen and also competed in the United States. In 1992, Abe was the runner up in the 250 cc category for the domestic National A championship. The following year at the All Japan Road Race Championship, Abe won the 500 cc title in the category's final year and became the youngest title winner.

In 1994, while racing in his home championship, Abe had a chance to race at the 1994 Japanese Grand Prix as a "wild card". He shocked the field by challenging for the win until three laps from the finish before falling off. Abe's performance impressed Kenny Roberts's Yamaha team, and was offered two more rides that year which yielded two sixth places and earned him a full-time Grand Prix ride for the 1995 season. This performance also so impressed a 14-year-old Valentino Rossi, that he took on the nickname "Rossifumi" and used it in his early career in deference to such a committed and spectacular racer.

Abe took his first podium finish in 1995, and his first win and fifth overall in the championship a year later. His team in 1997 was run by another former champion, Wayne Rainey, and Abe took regular points finishes over the next two seasons, including four podiums. He joined the d'Antin Antena 3 team in 1999, won at Rio de Janeiro that year, and won again at Suzuka a year later. Abe spent two seasons on less competitive machinery, yet his race results ensured his 100% record of top-ten championship finishes continued.

However, 2002 was the first year of MotoGP regulations, and Abe did not get on well with the four-stroke machinery. As such, when D'Antin switched over to the Yamaha YZR-M1 for 2003, Abe left the team and acted as a factory test rider and occasional wild card racer for Yamaha. He got another chance on the Tech3 Yamaha team for 2004, but was unsuccessful, and was moved to Yamaha's returning Superbike World Championship squad for 2005. He continued to race there in 2006 but failed to score a podium in both seasons.

In 2007, Abe competed in the All Japan Superbike Championship, again on a Yamaha.

=== Death ===
On October 7, 2007, while riding a 500 cc Yamaha T-Max scooter in Kawasaki, Kanagawa, Abe was involved in a traffic crash with a truck, which made an illegal U-turn in front of him, at 6:20 p.m. local time. He was pronounced dead two and a half hours later, at 8:50 p.m., at the hospital where he was taken for treatment.

== Personal life ==
Abe's son Maiki is also a motorcycle racer who competes in the All Japan Road Race Championship. He attended the Yamaha VR46 Mastercamp training at Valentino Rossi's ranch in Tavullia, Italy, accompanied by his grandfather Mitsuo. In 2023, his son joined VFT Racing Yamaha to compete in the Supersport World Championship.

== Career statistics ==
=== Grand Prix motorcycle racing ===
==== Races by year ====
(key) (Races in bold indicate pole position; races in italics indicate fastest lap)

| Year | Class | Team | Bike | 1 | 2 | 3 | 4 | 5 | 6 | 7 | 8 | 9 | 10 | 11 | 12 | 13 | 14 | 15 | 16 | Pos | Pts |
|---|---|---|---|---|---|---|---|---|---|---|---|---|---|---|---|---|---|---|---|---|---|
| 1994 | 500cc | Mister Yumcha Blue Fox Honda | NSR500 | AUS | MAL | JPN; Ret | ESP | AUT | GER | NED | ITA | FRA | | | | | | | | 17th | 20 |
| 1994 | 500cc | Roberts Marlboro Yamaha | YZR500 | | | | | | | | | | GBR; DNS | CZE; 6 | USA; 6 | ARG | EUR | | | 17th | 20 |
| 1995 | 500cc | Roberts Marlboro Yamaha | YZR500 | AUS; 9 | MAL; Ret | JPN; 9 | ESP; 4 | GER; 8 | ITA; 6 | NED; 6 | FRA; Ret | GBR; 18 | CZE; Ret | BRA; 3 | ARG; 6 | EUR; Ret | | | | 9th | 81 |
| 1996 | 500cc | Roberts Marlboro Yamaha | YZR500 | MAL; 8 | INA; 9 | JPN; 1 | ESP; Ret | ITA; 11 | FRA; 4 | NED; 6 | GER; 6 | GBR; 3 | AUT; 3 | CZE; 11 | IMO; 5 | CAT; 10 | BRA; 3 | AUS; Ret | | 5th | 148 |
| 1997 | 500cc | Yamaha Team Rainey | YZR500 | MAL; 8 | JPN; 7 | ESP; 7 | ITA; 7 | AUT; 9 | FRA; 7 | NED; 10 | IMO; 7 | GER; Ret | BRA; 5 | GBR; 9 | CZE; 5 | CAT; 12 | INA; 5 | AUS; 3 | | 7th | 126 |
| 1998 | 500cc | Yamaha Team Rainey | YZR500 | JPN; 14 | MAL; Ret | ESP; 6 | ITA; 6 | FRA; 7 | MAD; 2 | NED; Ret | GBR; 3 | GER; Ret | CZE; 5 | IMO; 6 | CAT; 3 | AUS; 5 | ARG; 4 | | | 6th | 128 |
| 1999 | 500cc | d'Antin Antena 3 Yamaha | YZR500 | MAL; Ret | JPN; 3 | ESP; 5 | FRA; 6 | ITA; Ret | CAT; Ret | NED; 6 | GBR; 6 | GER; 3 | CZE; Ret | IMO; 11 | VAL; 6 | AUS; 16 | RSA; 9 | BRA; 1 | ARG; 3 | 6th | 136 |
| 2000 | 500cc | d'Antin Antena 3 Yamaha | YZR500 | RSA; 7 | MAL; 17 | JPN; 1 | ESP; Ret | FRA; 2 | ITA; 5 | CAT; 2 | NED; 10 | GBR; 6 | GER; 11 | CZE; Ret | POR; 9 | VAL; Ret | BRA; 4 | PAC; 5 | AUS; 6 | 8th | 147 |
| 2001 | 500cc | d'Antin Antena 3 Yamaha | YZR500 | JPN; 4 | RSA; 5 | ESP; 2 | FRA; 4 | ITA; 9 | CAT; 6 | NED; Ret | GBR; Ret | GER; 4 | CZE; 4 | POR; Ret | VAL; 8 | PAC; 4 | AUS; 13 | MAL; 13 | BRA; 6 | 7th | 137 |
| 2002 | MotoGP | d'Antin Antena 3 Yamaha | YZR500 | JPN; 5 | RSA; 7 | ESP; 6 | FRA; 4 | ITA; 7 | CAT; 16 | NED; 9 | GBR; 4 | GER; 6 | CZE; 8 | POR; 7 | BRA; 6 | PAC; 8 | MAL; 10 | | | 6th | 129 |
| 2002 | MotoGP | d'Antin Antena 3 Yamaha | YZR-M1 | | | | | | | | | | | | | | | AUS; DNS | VAL; 10 | 6th | 129 |
| 2003 | MotoGP | Fortuna Yamaha | YZR-M1 | JPN; 11 | RSA; 8 | ESP | | | | | | | | | | | | | VAL; 9 | 16th | 31 |
| 2003 | MotoGP | Yamaha | YZR-M1 | | | | FRA; 11 | ITA | CAT | NED | GBR | GER; 10 | CZE | POR | BRA | PAC | MAL | AUS | | 16th | 31 |
| 2004 | MotoGP | Fortuna Gauloises Yamaha Tech3 | YZR-M1 | RSA; 9 | ESP; 11 | FRA; Ret | ITA; 7 | CAT; 9 | NED; 11 | BRA; 8 | GER; Ret | GBR; Ret | CZE; 8 | POR; 10 | JPN; Ret | QAT; 7 | MAL; 12 | AUS; 17 | VAL; 10 | 13th | 74 |
