= 1999 Japanese motorcycle Grand Prix =

(Japan) 1999 Japanese Grand Prix
Race details
- Race 2 of 16 races in the 1999 Grand Prix motorcycle racing season
- Date: 25 April 1999
- Official name: Marlboro Grand Prix of Japan
- Location: Twin Ring Motegi
- Course: Permanent racing facility; 4.801 km (2.983 mi)

500cc
Pole position
- Rider: (United States) Kenny Roberts Jr.
- Time: 1:50.826
Fastest lap
- Rider: (Australia) Mick Doohan
- Time: 2:02.889 on lap 19
Podium
- First: (United States) Kenny Roberts Jr.
- Second: (Australia) Mick Doohan
- Third: (Japan) Norick Abe

250cc
Pole position
- Rider: (Italy) Franco Battaini
- Time: 2:06.752
Fastest lap
- Rider: (Japan) Tohru Ukawa
- Time: 2:05.726 on lap 19
Podium
- First: (Japan) Shinya Nakano
- Second: (Japan) Tohru Ukawa
- Third: (Italy) Loris Capirossi

125cc
Pole position
- Rider: (Italy) Lucio Cecchinello
- Time: 2:00.785
Fastest lap
- Rider: (Italy) Max Sabbatani
- Time: 2:10.519 on lap 13
Podium
- First: (Japan) Masao Azuma
- Second: (Japan) Hideyuki Nakajo
- Third: (Spain) Emilio Alzamora

The 1999 Japanese motorcycle Grand Prix was the second round of the 1999 Grand Prix motorcycle racing season. It took place on 25 April 1999 at the Twin Ring Motegi.

This race would be the final 500cc podium for 5-time world champion Mick Doohan.

== 500 cc classification ==
Pos.	No.	Rider	Team	Manufacturer	Laps	Time/Retired	Grid	Points
1	10	(United States) Kenny Roberts Jr.	Suzuki Grand Prix Team	Suzuki	25	51:54.386	1	25
2	1	(Australia) Mick Doohan	Repsol Honda Team	Honda	25	+3.841	2	20
3	6	(Japan) Norick Abe	Antena 3 Yamaha d'Antin	Yamaha	25	+21.758	10	16
4	3	(Spain) Àlex Crivillé	Repsol Honda Team	Honda	25	+23.610	9	13
5	15	(Spain) Sete Gibernau	Repsol Honda Team	Honda	25	+23.984	14	11
6	4	(Spain) Carlos Checa	Marlboro Yamaha Team	Yamaha	25	+37.480	3	10
7	36	(Japan) Shinichi Ito	Lucky Strike Honda	Honda	25	+50.582	13	9
8	5	(Brazil) Alex Barros	Movistar Honda Pons	Honda	25	+52.008	6	8
9	2	(Italy) Max Biaggi	Marlboro Yamaha Team	Yamaha	25	+53.524	5	7
10	9	(Japan) Nobuatsu Aoki	Suzuki Grand Prix Team	Suzuki	25	+1:05.068	11	6
11	14	(Spain) Juan Borja	Movistar Honda Pons	Honda	25	+1:08.314	15	5
12	16	(Japan) Yukio Kagayama	Suzuki Grand Prix Team	Suzuki	25	+1:13.299	12	4
13	71	(Japan) Noriyasu Numata	Team Biland GP1	MuZ Weber	25	+1:19.245	25	3
14	25	(Spain) José Luis Cardoso	Team Maxon TSR	TSR-Honda	25	+1:26.998	17	2
15	8	(Japan) Tadayuki Okada	Repsol Honda Team	Honda	25	+1:30.225	8	1
16	22	(France) Sébastien Gimbert	Tecmas Honda Elf	Honda	25	+1:52.896	23	
17	18	(Germany) Markus Ober	Dee Cee Jeans Racing Team	Honda	24	+1 lap	24	
18	21	(United Kingdom) Michael Rutter	Millar Honda	Honda	24	+1 lap	22	
19	20	(United States) Mike Hale	Proton KR Modenas	Modenas KR3	24	+1 lap	26	
Ret	19	(United States) John Kocinski	Kanemoto Honda	Honda	15	Accident	4	
Ret	26	(Japan) Haruchika Aoki	FCC TSR	TSR-Honda	13	Retirement	18	
Ret	12	(France) Jean-Michel Bayle	Proton KR Modenas	Modenas KR3	6	Retirement	20	
Ret	17	(Netherlands) Jurgen van den Goorbergh	Team Biland GP1	MuZ Weber	2	Retirement	19	
Ret	55	(France) Régis Laconi	Red Bull Yamaha WCM	Yamaha	1	Accident	7	
Ret	31	(Japan) Tetsuya Harada	Aprilia Grand Prix Racing	Aprilia	1	Retirement	16	
Ret	11	(New Zealand) Simon Crafar	Red Bull Yamaha WCM	Yamaha	0	Retirement	21	

== 250 cc classification ==
Pos.	No.	Rider	Manufacturer	Laps	Time/Retired	Grid	Points
1	56	(Japan) Shinya Nakano	Yamaha	23	48:52.950	2	25
2	4	(Japan) Tohru Ukawa	Honda	23	+2.697	3	20
3	1	(Italy) Loris Capirossi	Honda	23	+9.260	9	16
4	21	(Italy) Franco Battaini	Aprilia	23	+11.895	1	13
5	51	(Japan) Daijiro Kato	Honda	23	+13.793	10	11
6	52	(Japan) Tatsuya Yamaguchi	Honda	23	+14.264	8	10
7	46	(Italy) Valentino Rossi	Aprilia	23	+21.092	11	9
8	11	(Japan) Tomomi Manako	Yamaha	23	+24.485	12	8
9	34	(Italy) Marcellino Lucchi	Aprilia	23	+45.594	5	7
10	14	(Australia) Anthony West	TSR-Honda	23	+49.724	17	6
11	49	(Japan) Naoki Matsudo	Yamaha	23	+1:07.293	7	5
12	44	(Italy) Roberto Rolfo	Aprilia	23	+1:11.813	18	4
13	15	(Spain) David García	Yamaha	23	+1:15.851	27	3
14	10	(Spain) Fonsi Nieto	Yamaha	23	+1:17.806	19	2
15	54	(Japan) Tekkyu Kayo	TSR-Honda	23	+1:18.400	23	1
16	36	(Japan) Masaki Tokudome	TSR-Honda	23	+1:19.374	20	
17	12	(Argentina) Sebastián Porto	Yamaha	23	+1:28.624	21	
18	66	(Germany) Alex Hofmann	TSR-Honda	23	+1:40.318	22	
19	41	(Netherlands) Jarno Janssen	TSR-Honda	22	+1 lap	26	
20	53	(Japan) Ken Eguchi	Yamaha	22	+1 lap	29	
21	58	(Argentina) Matías Ríos	Aprilia	22	+1 lap	28	
Ret	71	(Japan) Takehiko Kurokawa	TSR-Honda	15	Accident	31	
Ret	24	(United Kingdom) Jason Vincent	Honda	13	Accident	13	
Ret	23	(France) Julien Allemand	TSR-Honda	13	Retirement	30	
Ret	16	(Sweden) Johan Stigefelt	Yamaha	5	Accident	15	
Ret	50	(Japan) Taro Sekiguchi	Yamaha	5	Retirement	25	
Ret	19	(France) Olivier Jacque	Yamaha	3	Accident	6	
Ret	7	(Italy) Stefano Perugini	Honda	2	Accident	16	
Ret	37	(Italy) Luca Boscoscuro	TSR-Honda	2	Retirement	14	
Ret	22	(Spain) Lucas Oliver	Yamaha	2	Accident	24	
Ret	9	(United Kingdom) Jeremy McWilliams	Aprilia	0	Retirement	4	

== 125 cc classification ==
Pos.	No.	Rider	Manufacturer	Laps	Time/Retired	Grid	Points
1	4	(Japan) Masao Azuma	Honda	21	46:17.752	6	25
2	48	(Japan) Hideyuki Nakajo	Honda	21	+21.903	13	20
3	7	(Spain) Emilio Alzamora	Honda	21	+32.523	3	16
4	41	(Japan) Youichi Ui	Derbi	21	+35.700	26	13
5	50	(Japan) Katsuji Uezu	Yamaha	21	+36.781	25	11
6	5	(Italy) Lucio Cecchinello	Honda	21	+36.903	1	10
7	11	(Italy) Max Sabbatani	Honda	21	+38.296	12	9
8	1	(Japan) Kazuto Sakata	Honda	21	+40.169	11	8
9	47	(Japan) Kazuhiro Kubo	Yamaha	21	+40.956	24	7
10	51	(Japan) Minoru Nakamura	Honda	21	+48.719	15	6
11	29	(Spain) Ángel Nieto, Jr.	Honda	21	+49.059	14	5
12	8	(Italy) Gianluigi Scalvini	Aprilia	21	+54.125	4	4
13	17	(Germany) Steve Jenkner	Aprilia	21	+1:29.946	28	3
14	26	(Italy) Ivan Goi	Honda	21	+1:32.451	21	2
15	12	(France) Randy de Puniet	Aprilia	21	+1:43.423	23	1
16	32	(Italy) Mirko Giansanti	Aprilia	21	+1:58.985	5	
17	18	(Germany) Reinhard Stolz	Honda	21	+2:00.130	22	
18	54	(San Marino) Manuel Poggiali	Aprilia	21	+2:06.371	8	
19	22	(Spain) Pablo Nieto	Derbi	20	+1 lap	29	
20	9	(France) Frédéric Petit	Aprilia	20	+1 lap	9	
21	44	(Italy) Alessandro Brannetti	Aprilia	20	+1 lap	18	
Ret	20	(Germany) Bernhard Absmeier	Aprilia	12	Retirement	20	
Ret	49	(Japan) Jun Inageda	Honda	10	Accident	16	
Ret	23	(Italy) Gino Borsoi	Aprilia	10	Retirement	19	
Ret	21	(France) Arnaud Vincent	Aprilia	7	Accident	10	
Ret	10	(Spain) Jerónimo Vidal	Aprilia	7	Retirement	27	
Ret	6	(Japan) Noboru Ueda	Honda	5	Accident	17	
Ret	15	(Italy) Roberto Locatelli	Aprilia	4	Accident	2	
Ret	16	(Italy) Simone Sanna	Honda	0	Accident	7	

== Championship standings after the race (500cc) ==
Below are the standings for the top five riders and constructors after round two has concluded.

Riders' Championship standings

Pos.	Rider	Points
1	(United States) Kenny Roberts Jr.	50
2	(Australia) Mick Doohan	33
3	(Spain) Carlos Checa	30
4	(Spain) Àlex Crivillé	29
5	(Brazil) Alex Barros	18

Constructors' Championship standings

Pos.	Constructor	Points
1	(Japan) Suzuki	50
2	(Japan) Yamaha	36
3	(Japan) Honda	36
4	(Malaysia) Modenas KR3	4
5	(Italy) Aprilia	3

- Note: Only the top five positions are included for both sets of standings.

Previous race: 1999 Malaysian Grand Prix	FIM Grand Prix World Championship; 1999 season	Next race: 1999 Spanish Grand Prix
Previous race: 1998 Japanese Grand Prix	Japanese Grand Prix	Next race: 2000 Japanese Grand Prix
