= 1999 Malaysian motorcycle Grand Prix =

(Malaysia) 1999 Malaysian Grand Prix
Race details
- Race 1 of 16 races in the 1999 Grand Prix motorcycle racing season
- Date: 18 April 1999
- Official name: Marlboro Malaysian Grand Prix
- Location: Sepang International Circuit
- Course: Permanent racing facility; 5.542 km (3.444 mi)

500cc
Pole position
- Rider: (United States) John Kocinski
- Time: 2:06.848
Fastest lap
- Rider: (Australia) Mick Doohan
- Time: 2:07.213 on lap 18
Podium
- First: (United States) Kenny Roberts Jr.
- Second: (Spain) Carlos Checa
- Third: (Spain) Àlex Crivillé

250cc
Pole position
- Rider: (Italy) Valentino Rossi
- Time: 2:08.956
Fastest lap
- Rider: (Italy) Loris Capirossi
- Time: 2:09.381 on lap 11
Podium
- First: (Italy) Loris Capirossi
- Second: (Japan) Tohru Ukawa
- Third: (Japan) Shinya Nakano

125cc
Pole position
- Rider: (France) Arnaud Vincent
- Time: 2:17.052
Fastest lap
- Rider: (Spain) Emilio Alzamora
- Time: 2:16.868 on lap 19
Podium
- First: (Japan) Masao Azuma
- Second: (Spain) Emilio Alzamora
- Third: (Italy) Gianluigi Scalvini

The 1999 Malaysian motorcycle Grand Prix was the first round of the 1999 Grand Prix motorcycle racing season. It took place on 18 April 1999 at the Sepang International Circuit.

== 500 cc classification ==
Pos.	No.	Rider	Team	Manufacturer	Laps	Time/Retired	Grid	Points
1	10	(United States) Kenny Roberts Jr.	Suzuki Grand Prix Team	Suzuki	21	44:56.033	3	25
2	4	(Spain) Carlos Checa	Marlboro Yamaha Team	Yamaha	21	+4.279	14	20
3	3	(Spain) Àlex Crivillé	Repsol Honda Team	Honda	21	+4.780	5	16
4	1	(Australia) Mick Doohan	Repsol Honda Team	Honda	21	+4.902	7	13
5	8	(Japan) Tadayuki Okada	Repsol Honda Team	Honda	21	+7.269	12	11
6	5	(Brazil) Alex Barros	Movistar Honda Pons	Honda	21	+13.202	11	10
7	55	(France) Régis Laconi	Red Bull Yamaha WCM	Yamaha	21	+23.724	8	9
8	14	(Spain) Juan Borja	Movistar Honda Pons	Honda	21	+23.811	9	8
9	9	(Japan) Nobuatsu Aoki	Suzuki Grand Prix Team	Suzuki	21	+25.156	4	7
10	15	(Spain) Sete Gibernau	Repsol Honda Team	Honda	21	+31.548	13	6
11	16	(Japan) Yukio Kagayama	Suzuki Grand Prix Team	Suzuki	21	+35.205	10	5
12	12	(France) Jean-Michel Bayle	Proton KR Modenas	Modenas KR3	21	+42.405	15	4
13	31	(Japan) Tetsuya Harada	Aprilia Grand Prix Racing	Aprilia	21	+46.749	18	3
14	11	(New Zealand) Simon Crafar	Red Bull Yamaha WCM	Yamaha	21	+50.732	19	2
15	26	(Japan) Haruchika Aoki	FCC TSR	TSR-Honda	21	+51.667	16	1
16	22	(France) Sébastien Gimbert	Tecmas Honda Elf	Honda	21	+1:14.752	21	
17	18	(Germany) Markus Ober	Dee Cee Jeans Racing Team	Honda	21	+1:51.775	25	
18	20	(United States) Mike Hale	Proton KR Modenas	Modenas KR3	21	+1:54.512	24	
Ret	21	(United Kingdom) Michael Rutter	Millar Honda	Honda	14	Accident	22	
Ret	25	(Spain) José Luis Cardoso	Team Maxon TSR	TSR-Honda	11	Retirement	20	
Ret	2	(Italy) Max Biaggi	Marlboro Yamaha Team	Yamaha	10	Retirement	2	
Ret	17	(Netherlands) Jurgen van den Goorbergh	Team Biland GP1	MuZ Weber	10	Retirement	23	
Ret	7	(Italy) Luca Cadalora	Team Biland GP1	MuZ Weber	9	Retirement	17	
Ret	19	(United States) John Kocinski	Kanemoto Honda	Honda	3	Collision	1	
Ret	6	(Japan) Norick Abe	Antena 3 Yamaha d'Antin	Yamaha	3	Collision	6	
DNQ	45	(Australia) John Allen	Raceline Malaysia	Honda		Did not qualify		
DNQ	68	(Australia) Mark Willis	Buckley Systems BSL Racing	BSL		Did not qualify		

== 250 cc classification ==
Pos.	No.	Rider	Manufacturer	Laps	Time/Retired	Grid	Points
1	1	(Italy) Loris Capirossi	Honda	20	43:29.305	4	25
2	4	(Japan) Tohru Ukawa	Honda	20	+0.111	5	20
3	56	(Japan) Shinya Nakano	Yamaha	20	+0.787	2	16
4	19	(France) Olivier Jacque	Yamaha	20	+14.894	3	13
5	46	(Italy) Valentino Rossi	Aprilia	20	+24.569	1	11
6	34	(Italy) Marcellino Lucchi	Aprilia	20	+30.774	7	10
7	9	(United Kingdom) Jeremy McWilliams	Aprilia	20	+34.877	9	9
8	49	(Japan) Naoki Matsudo	Yamaha	20	+35.294	8	8
9	7	(Italy) Stefano Perugini	Honda	20	+52.956	15	7
10	44	(Italy) Roberto Rolfo	Aprilia	20	+58.656	11	6
11	37	(Italy) Luca Boscoscuro	TSR-Honda	20	+1:05.383	13	5
12	24	(United Kingdom) Jason Vincent	Honda	20	+1:05.385	16	4
13	36	(Japan) Masaki Tokudome	Honda	20	+1:21.549	17	3
14	14	(Australia) Anthony West	TSR-Honda	20	+1:22.318	21	2
15	12	(Argentina) Sebastián Porto	Yamaha	20	+1:22.741	23	1
16	16	(Sweden) Johan Stigefelt	Yamaha	20	+1:24.652	14	
17	66	(Germany) Alex Hofmann	Honda	20	+1:30.484	12	
18	23	(France) Julien Allemand	TSR-Honda	20	+1:42.994	22	
19	15	(Spain) David García	Yamaha	20	+1:56.191	19	
20	41	(Netherlands) Jarno Janssen	TSR-Honda	20	+1:56.369	18	
21	58	(Argentina) Matías Ríos	Aprilia	19	+1 lap	26	
22	10	(Spain) Fonsi Nieto	Yamaha	19	+1 lap	24	
23	22	(Spain) Lucas Oliver	Yamaha	19	+1 lap	25	
Ret	63	(Malaysia) Shahrol Yuzy	Honda	19	Accident	20	
Ret	21	(Italy) Franco Battaini	Aprilia	15	Retirement	6	
Ret	11	(Japan) Tomomi Manako	Yamaha	4	Accident	10	
Ret	61	(Malaysia) Meng Heng Kuang	Honda	4	Retirement	27	
DNS	17	(Netherlands) Maurice Bolwerk	TSR-Honda		Did not start		
WD	6	(Germany) Ralf Waldmann	Aprilia		Withdrew		

== 125 cc classification ==
Pos.	No.	Rider	Manufacturer	Laps	Time/Retired	Grid	Points
1	4	(Japan) Masao Azuma	Honda	19	43:55.438	4	25
2	7	(Spain) Emilio Alzamora	Honda	19	+0.106	2	20
3	8	(Italy) Gianluigi Scalvini	Aprilia	19	+10.509	6	16
4	21	(France) Arnaud Vincent	Aprilia	19	+12.909	1	13
5	10	(Spain) Jerónimo Vidal	Aprilia	19	+20.695	15	11
6	16	(Italy) Simone Sanna	Honda	19	+27.184	7	10
7	23	(Italy) Gino Borsoi	Aprilia	19	+27.208	8	9
8	26	(Italy) Ivan Goi	Honda	19	+27.351	18	8
9	32	(Italy) Mirko Giansanti	Aprilia	19	+27.507	19	7
10	1	(Japan) Kazuto Sakata	Honda	19	+27.514	16	6
11	11	(Italy) Max Sabbatani	Honda	19	+27.734	10	5
12	54	(San Marino) Manuel Poggiali	Aprilia	19	+37.922	13	4
13	41	(Japan) Youichi Ui	Derbi	19	+38.264	20	3
14	29	(Spain) Ángel Nieto, Jr.	Honda	19	+38.344	5	2
15	17	(Germany) Steve Jenkner	Aprilia	19	+41.962	12	1
16	44	(Italy) Alessandro Brannetti	Aprilia	19	+44.310	14	
17	5	(Italy) Lucio Cecchinello	Honda	19	+47.056	11	
18	15	(Italy) Roberto Locatelli	Aprilia	19	+56.919	3	
19	18	(Germany) Reinhard Stolz	Honda	19	+59.108	23	
20	12	(France) Randy de Puniet	Aprilia	19	+1:02.934	21	
21	46	(Thailand) Direk Archewong	Honda	19	+1:49.298	24	
22	22	(Spain) Pablo Nieto	Derbi	19	+2:05.689	25	
Ret	6	(Japan) Noboru Ueda	Honda	11	Accident	9	
Ret	9	(France) Frédéric Petit	Aprilia	11	Accident	17	
Ret	20	(Germany) Bernhard Absmeier	Aprilia	11	Retirement	22	
Ret	45	(Malaysia) Magilai Meganathan	Honda	8	Retirement	26	
DNS	13	(Italy) Marco Melandri	Honda		Did not start		

== Championship standings after the race (500cc) ==
Below are the standings for the top five riders and constructors after round one has concluded.

Riders' Championship standings

Pos.	Rider	Points
1	(United States) Kenny Roberts Jr.	25
2	(Spain) Carlos Checa	20
3	(Spain) Àlex Crivillé	16
4	(Australia) Mick Doohan	13
5	(Japan) Tadayuki Okada	11

Constructors' Championship standings

Pos.	Constructor	Points
1	(Japan) Suzuki	25
2	(Japan) Yamaha	20
3	(Japan) Honda	16
4	(Malaysia) Modenas KR3	4
5	(Italy) Aprilia	3

- Note: Only the top five positions are included for both sets of standings.

Previous race: 1998 Argentine Grand Prix	FIM Grand Prix World Championship; 1999 season	Next race: 1999 Japanese Grand Prix
Previous race: 1998 Malaysian Grand Prix	Malaysian Grand Prix	Next race: 2000 Malaysian Grand Prix
