= Noboru Ueda =

Japanese motorcycle racer

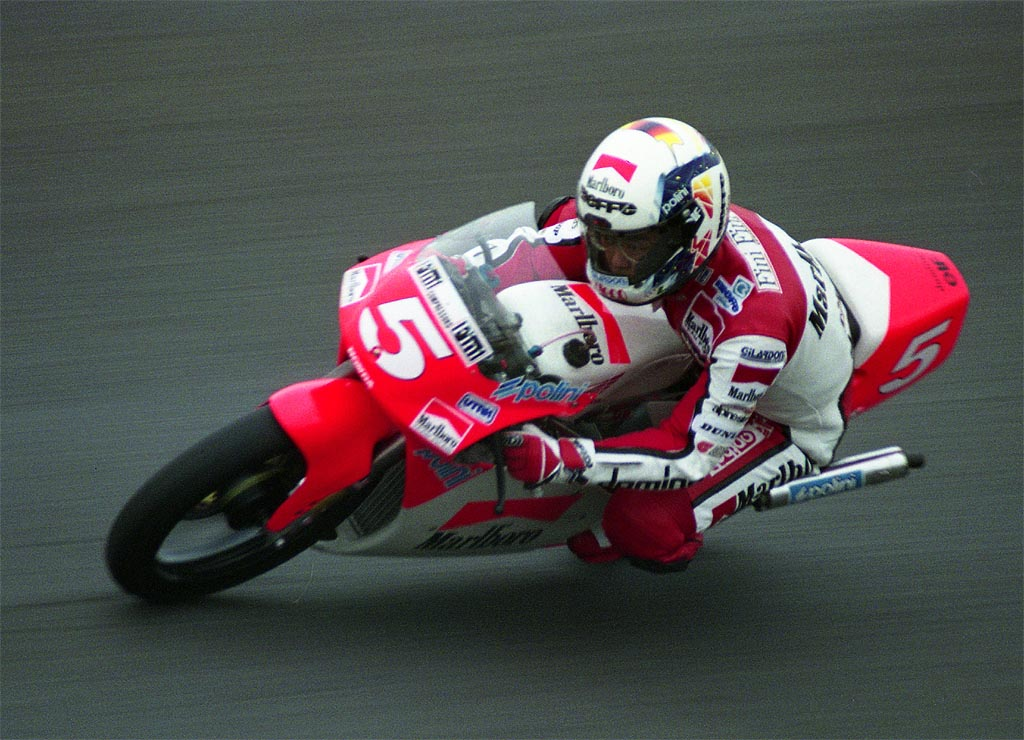
- Noboru Ueda at the 1992 Japanese GP
- Nationality: Japanese
Motorcycle racing career statistics
Grand Prix motorcycle racing
Active years	1991 - 2002
First race	1991 125cc Japanese Grand Prix
Last race	2002 125cc Valencia Grand Prix
First win	1991 125cc Japanese Grand Prix
Last win	2001 125cc Italian Grand Prix
Team	Honda
Starts / Wins / Podiums / Poles / F. laps / Points; 160 / 13 / 39 / 19 / 11 / 1412

Noboru "Nobby" Ueda (上田昇; born July 23, 1967 in Tahara, Aichi) is a former Grand Prix motorcycle road racer. He was exclusively a 125 class rider. Ueda began his Grand Prix career with a win in his inaugural race at the 1991 Japanese Grand Prix. His best seasons were in 1994, when he finished second in the 125cc world championship behind Kazuto Sakata and in 1997, when he finished second behind Valentino Rossi.

In 1998, Ueda fell off his bike, breaking his arm and receiving nerve damage that nearly paralyzed his right hand. This injury led to him wearing the first mechanised glove (produced by Spidi) that gave him the ability to grip the throttle and brake levers.

After a 12-year career in Grand Prix competition, Ueda announced his retirement at the end of the 2002 season, citing the need to let his body recuperate after several racing injuries. Ueda won 13 Grand Prix races during his career. He now runs his own team known as Team Nobby, which competes in the All Japan Road Race Championship in the J-GP3 class.

== Grand Prix career statistics ==
Points system from 1988 to 1991:

**Position**	1	2	3	4	5	6	7	8	9	10	11	12	13	14	15
**Points**	20	17	15	13	11	10	9	8	7	6	5	4	3	2	1

Points system in 1992:

**Position**	1	2	3	4	5	6	7	8	9	10
**Points**	20	15	12	10	8	6	4	3	2	1

Points system from 1993 onwards:

**Position**	1	2	3	4	5	6	7	8	9	10	11	12	13	14	15
**Points**	25	20	16	13	11	10	9	8	7	6	5	4	3	2	1

(key) (Races in bold indicate pole position; races in italics indicate fastest lap)

Year	Class	Team	Machine	1	2	3	4	5	6	7	8	9	10	11	12	13	14	15	16	Points	Rank	Wins
1991	125cc	Hero Sports TS-Honda	RS125	**JPN**; 1	AUS; 3	USA -	**ESP**; 1	ITA; NC	GER -	AUT; 3	EUR; NC	NED; 12	**FRA**; 5	GBR; 5	**RSM**; 9	CZE; NC	VDM; 17	MAL; 7		105	5th	2
1992	125cc	Marlboro Pileri-Honda	RS125	JPN; NC	AUS; 16	MAL; 11	ESP; NC	ITA; 3	EUR; 8	GER; NC	NED -	HUN; 8	FRA; 2	GBR; 3	BRA; 7	RSA; 5				57	9th	0
1993	125cc	Marlboro Pileri-Honda	RS125	AUS; 8	MAL; 4	JPN; 5	ESP; 5	AUT; NC	GER; 11	NED; NC	EUR; 1	RSM; 6	GBR; 6	CZE; 4	ITA; NC	USA; 4	FIM; 6			129	5th	1
1994	125cc	Givi Racing-Honda	RS125	AUS; 7	MAL; 1	**JPN**; NC	ESP; 4	**AUT**; 2	**GER**; 6	**NED**; NC	ITA; 1	FRA; 1	GBR; 6	CZE; 2	USA; 9	**ARG**; 2	EUR; 6			194	2nd	3
1995	125cc	Givi Racing-Honda	RS125	AUS; 5	MAL; 21	JPN; 14	ESP; 5	GER; 2	ITA; NC	NED; NC	FRA; 13	GBR; NC	CZE; 9	BRA; 5	ARG; 13	EUR; NC				65	12th	0
1996	125cc	Honda	RS125	MAL; 9	INA; 6	**JPN**; 3	ESP; 3	ITA; 12	FRA; 4	NED; 4	GER; 12	GBR; 6	AUT; 11	CZE; NC	IMO; 11	CAT; 11	BRA; 6	AUS; 8		126	7th	0
1997	125cc	Honda	RS125	MAL; 3	JPN; 1	ESP; 2	ITA; 4	AUT; 1	FRA; NC	NED; 4	IMO; 5	GER; NC	BRA; 2	GBR; 3	CZE; 1	CAT; 3	INA; 4	AUS; 1		238	2nd	4
1998	125cc	Team Givi-Honda LCR	RS125	**JPN**; NC	**MAL**; 1	ESP; 5	**ITA**; 7	**FRA**; NC	MAD -	NED -	GBR -	GER -	CZE -	IMO -	CAT; 6	AUS; 18	ARG; 9			62	13th	1
1999	125cc	Team Givi-Honda LCR	RS125	MAL; NC	JPN; NC	ESP; 8	FRA; 5	ITA; 3	CAT; 4	NED; 2	GBR; 2	GER; 5	CZE; 2	IMO; 5	VAL; 3	**AUS**; NC	RSA; NC	BRA; 1	ARG; NC	171	5th	1
2000	125cc	Team Givi-Honda LCR	RS125	RSA; 5	**MAL**; 5	JPN; 2	ESP; 5	FRA; NC	ITA; 6	CAT; NC	NED; 2	GBR; 3	GER; 13	CZE; 5	POR; NC	VAL; 11	BRA; 6	PAC; 7	AUS; 3	153	5th	0
2001	125cc	F.C.C.-TSR Honda	RS125	JPN; NC	RSA; 3	ESP; 4	FRA; 7	ITA; 1	CAT; NC	NED; 4	GBR; 23	GER -	CZE; 11	POR; NC	VAL; NC	PAC; NC	AUS; 11	MAL; 11	BRA; 13	94	9th	1
2002	125cc	Semprucci Angaia-Honda	RS125	JPN; 4	RSA; 11	ESP; 17	FRA; NC	ITA; NC	CAT -	NED -	GBR -	GER -	CZE -	POR; NC	BRA; 25	PAC; 27	MAL; 18	AUS; 21	VAL; NC	18	23rd	0
