= 1998 Japanese motorcycle Grand Prix =

Japanese motorcycle racing event in 1998

(Japan) 1998 Japanese Grand Prix
Race details
- Race 1 of 14 races in the 1998 Grand Prix motorcycle racing season
- Date: 5 April 1998
- Official name: Marlboro Grand Prix of Japan
- Location: Suzuka Circuit
- Course: Permanent racing facility; 5.864 km (3.644 mi)

500cc
Pole position
Rider	(Italy) Max Biaggi	Honda
Time	2:05.772	
Fastest lap
Rider	(Italy) Max Biaggi	Honda
Time	2:06.746 on lap 4	
Podium
First	(Italy) Max Biaggi	Honda
Second	(Japan) Tadayuki Okada	Honda
Third	(Japan) Noriyuki Haga	Yamaha

250cc
Pole position
Rider	(Japan) Daijiro Kato	Honda
Time	2:08.430	
Fastest lap
Rider	(Japan) Naoki Matsudo	Yamaha
Time	2:09.284 on lap 8	
Podium
First	(Japan) Daijiro Kato	Honda
Second	(Japan) Shinya Nakano	Yamaha
Third	(Japan) Naoki Matsudo	Yamaha

125cc
Pole position
Rider	(Japan) Noboru Ueda	Honda
Time	2:15.162	
Fastest lap
Rider	(Japan) Masao Azuma	Honda
Time	2:16.128 on lap 6	
Podium
First	(Japan) Kazuto Sakata	Aprilia
Second	(Japan) Tomomi Manako	Honda
Third	(Japan) Masao Azuma	Honda

The 1998 Japanese motorcycle Grand Prix was the first round of the 1998 Grand Prix motorcycle racing season. It took place on 5 April 1998 at the Suzuka Circuit. The rookie Max Biaggi surprised everyone by winning his first ever GP500 race.

== 500 cc classification ==
Pos.	No.	Rider	Team	Manufacturer	Laps	Time/Retired	Grid	Points
1	6	(Italy) Max Biaggi	Marlboro Team Kanemoto	Honda	21	44:59.478	1	25
2	2	(Japan) Tadayuki Okada	Repsol Honda	Honda	21	+5.416	3	20
3	50	(Japan) Noriyuki Haga	Yamaha Racing Team	Yamaha	21	+5.502	6	16
4	4	(Spain) Àlex Crivillé	Repsol Honda	Honda	21	+10.532	10	13
5	21	(Japan) Kyoji Nanba	Yamaha Team Rainey	Yamaha	21	+10.879	2	11
6	3	(Japan) Nobuatsu Aoki	Suzuki Grand Prix Team	Suzuki	21	+13.479	8	10
7	9	(Brazil) Alex Barros	Honda Gresini	Honda	21	+20.266	13	9
8	8	(Spain) Carlos Checa	Movistar Honda Pons	Honda	21	+20.439	5	8
9	11	(New Zealand) Simon Crafar	Red Bull Yamaha WCM	Yamaha	21	+20.773	11	7
10	15	(Spain) Sete Gibernau	Repsol Honda	Honda	21	+47.101	12	6
11	10	(United States) Kenny Roberts Jr.	Team Roberts	Modenas KR3	21	+1:13.558	15	5
12	7	(Italy) Doriano Romboni	MuZ Roc RennSport	MuZ	21	+1:22.856	22	4
13	19	(United States) John Kocinski	Movistar Honda Pons	Honda	21	+1:24.964	9	3
14	5	(Japan) Norick Abe	Yamaha Team Rainey	Yamaha	21	+1:25.293	7	2
15	14	(Spain) Juan Borja	Shell Advance Racing	Honda	21	+1:59.992	16	1
16	57	(Italy) Fabio Carpani	Team Polini Inoxmacel	Honda	20	+1 lap	24	
Ret	1	(Australia) Mick Doohan	Repsol Honda	Honda	15	Retirement	4	
Ret	22	(France) Sébastien Gimbert	Tecmas Honda Elf	Honda	11	Retirement	20	
Ret	88	(United Kingdom) Scott Smart	Team Millar Honda Britain	Honda	4	Accident	23	
Ret	17	(Netherlands) Jurgen van den Goorbergh	Dee Cee Jeans Racing Team	Honda	1	Retirement	19	
Ret	23	(United States) Matt Wait	FCC TSR	Honda	1	Accident	21	
Ret	29	(Japan) Keiichi Kitagawa	Suzuki Grand Prix Team	Suzuki	1	Retirement	14	
Ret	18	(Australia) Garry McCoy	Shell Advance Racing	Honda	0	Retirement	18	
Ret	28	(Germany) Ralf Waldmann	Team Roberts	Modenas KR3	0	Retirement	17	
DNS	55	(France) Régis Laconi	Red Bull Yamaha WCM	Yamaha		Did not start		

== 250 cc classification ==
Pos.	No.	Rider	Manufacturer	Laps	Time/Retired	Grid	Points
1	54	(Japan) Daijiro Kato	Honda	19	41:17.096	1	25
2	50	(Japan) Shinya Nakano	Yamaha	19	+0.896	3	20
3	51	(Japan) Naoki Matsudo	Yamaha	19	+0.962	5	16
4	31	(Japan) Tetsuya Harada	Aprilia	19	+1.094	9	13
5	19	(France) Olivier Jacque	Honda	19	+34.301	4	11
6	55	(Japan) Yukio Kagayama	Suzuki	19	+37.035	14	10
7	65	(Italy) Loris Capirossi	Aprilia	19	+37.104	6	9
8	17	(Spain) José Luis Cardoso	Yamaha	19	+43.094	12	8
9	12	(Japan) Noriyasu Numata	Suzuki	19	+43.105	15	7
10	9	(United Kingdom) Jeremy McWilliams	TSR-Honda	19	+43.909	16	6
11	6	(Japan) Haruchika Aoki	Honda	19	+44.000	21	5
12	4	(Italy) Stefano Perugini	Honda	19	+44.067	13	4
13	52	(Japan) Choujun Kameya	Suzuki	19	+44.168	10	3
14	18	(Japan) Osamu Miyazaki	Yamaha	19	+44.637	8	2
15	7	(Japan) Takeshi Tsujimura	Yamaha	19	+44.727	17	1
16	53	(Japan) Makoto Tamada	Honda	19	+53.855	18	
17	11	(Germany) Jürgen Fuchs	Aprilia	19	+1:01.999	11	
18	37	(Italy) Luca Boscoscuro	TSR-Honda	19	+1:04.359	20	
19	24	(United Kingdom) Jason Vincent	TSR-Honda	19	+1:08.853	22	
20	14	(Italy) Davide Bulega	Honda	18	+1 lap	26	
Ret	25	(Japan) Yasumasa Hatakeyama	Honda	18	Accident	27	
Ret	21	(Italy) Franco Battaini	Yamaha	17	Accident	19	
Ret	5	(Japan) Tohru Ukawa	Honda	14	Retirement	2	
Ret	46	(Italy) Valentino Rossi	Aprilia	10	Retirement	7	
Ret	44	(Italy) Roberto Rolfo	TSR-Honda	7	Retirement	25	
Ret	16	(Sweden) Johan Stigefelt	Suzuki	2	Accident	24	
Ret	27	(Argentina) Sebastián Porto	Aprilia	1	Accident	23	
Ret	41	(Argentina) Federico Gartner	Aprilia	0	Accident	28	
DNS	8	(Spain) Luis d'Antin	Yamaha		Did not start		
DNS	20	(France) William Costes	Honda		Did not start		
OFFICIAL 250cc REPORT

== 125 cc classification ==
Pos.	No.	Rider	Manufacturer	Laps	Time/Retired	Grid	Points
1	4	(Japan) Kazuto Sakata	Aprilia	18	41:23.963	2	25
2	3	(Japan) Tomomi Manako	Honda	18	+0.156	18	20
3	20	(Japan) Masao Azuma	Honda	18	+0.201	6	16
4	10	(Italy) Lucio Cecchinello	Honda	18	+2.783	7	13
5	53	(Japan) Noboyuki Osaki	Yamaha	18	+26.381	9	11
6	8	(Italy) Gianluigi Scalvini	Honda	18	+26.468	10	10
7	52	(Japan) Hiroyuki Kikuchi	Honda	18	+33.198	12	9
8	5	(Japan) Masaki Tokudome	Aprilia	18	+33.422	11	8
9	51	(Japan) Takashi Akita	Yamaha	18	+33.552	23	7
10	13	(Italy) Marco Melandri	Honda	18	+33.834	14	6
11	9	(France) Frédéric Petit	Honda	18	+34.215	19	5
12	62	(Japan) Yoshiaki Katoh	Yamaha	18	+46.152	26	4
13	29	(Spain) Ángel Nieto, Jr.	Aprilia	18	+46.574	16	3
14	54	(Japan) Kazuhiro Takao	Honda	18	+48.281	17	2
15	26	(Italy) Ivan Goi	Aprilia	18	+59.684	20	1
16	17	(Spain) Enrique Maturana	Yamaha	18	+1:03.598	22	
17	11	(Spain) José Ramírez	Aprilia	18	+1:12.202	25	
18	19	(Italy) Andrea Ballerini	Honda	18	+1:12.287	27	
19	18	(Italy) Paolo Tessari	Aprilia	18	+1:21.902	28	
20	21	(France) Arnaud Vincent	Aprilia	18	+1:28.393	29	
21	7	(Spain) Emilio Alzamora	Aprilia	18	+1:33.214	24	
Ret	41	(Japan) Youichi Ui	Yamaha	14	Retirement	3	
Ret	22	(Germany) Steve Jenkner	Aprilia	13	Retirement	15	
Ret	2	(Japan) Noboru Ueda	Honda	12	Retirement	1	
Ret	15	(Italy) Roberto Locatelli	Honda	10	Accident	4	
Ret	23	(Italy) Gino Borsoi	Aprilia	7	Retirement	13	
Ret	16	(Italy) Christian Manna	Yamaha	6	Retirement	30	
Ret	32	(Italy) Mirko Giansanti	Honda	4	Accident	8	
Ret	50	(Japan) Yuzo Fujioka	Honda	2	Accident	5	
Ret	39	(Czech Republic) Jaroslav Huleš	Honda	1	Retirement	21	
OFFICIAL 125cc REPORT

== Championship standings after the race (500cc) ==
Below are the standings for the top five riders and constructors after round one has concluded.

Riders' Championship standings

Pos.	Rider	Points
1	(Italy) Max Biaggi	25
2	(Japan) Tadayuki Okada	20
3	(Japan) Noriyuki Haga	16
4	(Spain) Àlex Crivillé	13
5	(Japan) Kyoji Nanba	11

Constructors' Championship standings

Pos.	Constructor	Points
1	(Japan) Honda	25
2	(Japan) Yamaha	16
3	(Japan) Suzuki	10
4	(Malaysia) Modenas KR3	5
5	(Germany) MuZ	4

- Note: Only the top five positions are included for both sets of standings.

Previous race: 1997 Australian Grand Prix	FIM Grand Prix World Championship; 1998 season	Next race: 1998 Malaysian Grand Prix
Previous race: 1997 Japanese Grand Prix	Japanese Grand Prix	Next race: 1999 Japanese Grand Prix
