= 1997 Japanese motorcycle Grand Prix =

(Japan) 1997 Japanese Grand Prix
Race details
- Race 2 of 15 races in the 1997 Grand Prix motorcycle racing season
- Date: 20 April 1997
- Official name: Marlboro Grand Prix of Japan
- Location: Suzuka Circuit
- Course: Permanent racing facility; 5.864 km (3.644 mi)

500cc
Pole position
- Rider: (Japan) Tadayuki Okada
- Time: 2:07.952
Fastest lap
- Rider: (Australia) Mick Doohan
- Time: 2:07.782
Podium
- First: (Australia) Mick Doohan
- Second: (Spain) Àlex Crivillé
- Third: (Japan) Tadayuki Okada

250cc
Pole position
- Rider: (Japan) Tetsuya Harada
- Time: 2:09.541
Fastest lap
- Rider: (Japan) Tetsuya Harada
- Time: 2:10.253
Podium
- First: (Japan) Daijiro Kato
- Second: (Japan) Tohru Ukawa
- Third: (Japan) Tetsuya Harada

125cc
Pole position
- Rider: (Japan) Noboru Ueda
- Time: 2:16.879
Fastest lap
- Rider: (Japan) Masaki Tokudome
- Time: 2:17.462
Podium
- First: (Japan) Noboru Ueda
- Second: (Japan) Kazuto Sakata
- Third: (Japan) Hideyuki Nakajo

The 1997 Japanese motorcycle Grand Prix was the second round of the 1997 Grand Prix motorcycle racing season. It took place on 20 April 1997 at the Suzuka Circuit.

== 500 cc classification ==
Pos.	Rider	Team	Manufacturer	Time/Retired	Points
1	(Australia) Mick Doohan	Repsol YPF Honda Team	Honda	45:11.995	25
2	(Spain) Àlex Crivillé	Repsol YPF Honda Team	Honda	+0.431	20
3	(Japan) Tadayuki Okada	Repsol YPF Honda Team	Honda	+6.047	16
4	(Japan) Takuma Aoki	Repsol Honda	Honda	+23.619	13
5	(Japan) Nobuatsu Aoki	Rheos Elf FCC TS	Honda	+23.895	11
6	(Spain) Carlos Checa	Movistar Honda Pons	Honda	+24.402	10
7	(Japan) Norifumi Abe	Yamaha Team Rainey	Yamaha	+24.715	9
8	(Spain) Alberto Puig	Movistar Honda Pons	Honda	+43.913	8
9	(Japan) Katsuaki Fujiwara	Marlboro Yamaha Team	Yamaha	+44.003	7
10	(Brazil) Alex Barros	Honda Gresini	Honda	+59.879	6
11	(Italy) Luca Cadalora	Yamaha Promotor Racing	Yamaha	+59.605	5
12	(France) Regis Laconi	Team Tecmas	Honda	+59.876	4
13	(Australia) Peter Goddard	Lucky Strike Suzuki	Suzuki	+1:00.634	3
14	(France) Jean-Michel Bayle	Marlboro Team Roberts	Modenas KR3	+1:17.974	2
15	(Netherlands) Jurgen van den Goorbergh	Team Millar MQP	Honda	+1:35.154	1
16	(Australia) Kirk McCarthy	World Championship Motorsports	ROC Yamaha	+1:38.308	
17	(France) Frederic Protat	Soverex FP Racing	ROC Yamaha	+1 Lap	
Ret	(Italy) Lucio Pedercini	Team Pedercini	ROC Yamaha	Retirement	
Ret	(Germany) Jürgen Fuchs	Elf 500 ROC	Elf 500	Retirement	
Ret	(Spain) Sete Gibernau	Yamaha Team Rainey	Yamaha	Retirement	
Ret	(Australia) Troy Corser	Yamaha Promotor Racing	Yamaha	Retirement	
Ret	(Belgium) Laurent Naveau	Millet Racing	ROC Yamaha	Retirement	
Ret	(United States) Kenny Roberts Jr.	Marlboro Team Roberts	Modenas KR3	Retirement	
Ret	(Spain) Juan Borja	Elf 500 ROC	Elf 500	Retirement	
Ret	(Australia) Daryl Beattie	Lucky Strike Suzuki	Suzuki	Retirement	

== 250 cc classification ==
Pos	Rider	Manufacturer	Time/Retired	Points
1	(Japan) Daijiro Kato	Honda	41:42.226	25
2	(Japan) Tohru Ukawa	Honda	+0.208	20
3	(Japan) Tetsuya Harada	Aprilia	+0.318	16
4	(Japan) Takeshi Tsujimura	TSR-Honda	+1.008	13
5	(Germany) Ralf Waldmann	Honda	+5.564	11
6	(Japan) Yukio Kagayama	Suzuki	+21.038	10
7	(Italy) Max Biaggi	Honda	+27.881	9
8	(Japan) Haruchika Aoki	Honda	+27.921	8
9	(Japan) Noriyasu Numata	Suzuki	+28.318	7
10	(Japan) Naoki Matsudo	Yamaha	+30.174	6
11	(Italy) Loris Capirossi	Aprilia	+37.714	5
12	(Argentina) Sebastian Porto	Aprilia	+41.832	4
13	(Japan) Naoto Ogura	Yamaha	+49.898	3
14	(United Kingdom) Jamie Robinson	Suzuki	+50.584	2
15	(Japan) Choyun Kameya	Suzuki	+50.714	1
16	(United Kingdom) Jeremy McWilliams	Honda	+1:07.061	
17	(Spain) Luis d'Antin	Yamaha	+1:12.344	
18	(Switzerland) Oliver Petrucciani	Aprilia	+1:12.989	
19	(Italy) Luca Boscoscuro	Honda	+1:13.669	
20	(Spain) José Luis Cardoso	Yamaha	+1:14.013	
21	(Italy) Franco Battaini	Yamaha	+1:32.370	
22	(Italy) Cristiano Migliorati	Honda	+1 Lap	
Ret	(United States) Kurtis Roberts	Aprilia	Retirement	
Ret	(Spain) Idalio Gavira	Aprilia	Retirement	
Ret	(Japan) Osamu Miyazaki	Yamaha	Retirement	
Ret	(Japan) Kensuke Haga	Yamaha	Retirement	
Ret	(Spain) Eustaquio Gavira	Aprilia	Retirement	
Ret	(France) William Costes	Honda	Retirement	
Ret	(Italy) Stefano Perugini	Aprilia	Retirement	

== 125 cc classification ==
Pos	Rider	Manufacturer	Time/Retired	Points
1	(Japan) Noboru Ueda	Honda	41:48.072	25
2	(Japan) Kazuto Sakata	Aprilia	+0.365	20
3	(Japan) Hideyuki Nakajo	Honda	+0.506	16
4	(Japan) Masao Azuma	Honda	+2.154	13
5	(Spain) Jorge Martinez	Aprilia	+2.156	11
6	(Japan) Yoshiaki Katoh	Yamaha	+2.254	10
7	(Australia) Garry McCoy	Aprilia	+5.000	9
8	(Japan) Kazuhiro Takao	Honda	+9.000	8
9	(Italy) Gianluigi Scalvini	Honda	+12.000	7
10	(France) Frederic Petit	Honda	+12.544	6
11	(Italy) Roberto Locatelli	Honda	+23.974	5
12	(Japan) Tomomi Manako	Honda	+24.535	4
13	(Japan) Masaki Tokudome	Aprilia	+35.450	3
14	(Italy) Ivan Goi	Aprilia	+35.703	2
15	(Italy) Gino Borsoi	Yamaha	+35.747	1
16	(Japan) Katsuji Uezu	Yamaha	+36.244	
17	(Japan) Jun Inageda	Honda	+36.295	
18	(Italy) Mirko Giansanti	Honda	+37.144	
19	(Spain) Josep Sarda	Honda	+47.462	
20	(Japan) Yuzo Fujioka	Honda	+47.548	
21	(Germany) Steve Jenkner	Aprilia	+1:04.521	
22	(Spain) Angel Nieto Jr	Aprilia	+1:20.060	
23	(Germany) Manfred Geissler	Honda	+1:20.170	
24	(Spain) Enrique Maturana	Yamaha	+1:20.341	
Ret	(Italy) Valentino Rossi	Aprilia	Retirement	
Ret	(Germany) Peter Öttl	Aprilia	Retirement	
Ret	(Italy) Lucio Cecchinello	Honda	Retirement	
Ret	(Czech Republic) Jaroslav Hules	Honda	Retirement	

Previous race: 1997 Malaysian Grand Prix	FIM Grand Prix World Championship; 1997 season	Next race: 1997 Spanish Grand Prix
Previous race: 1995 Japanese Grand Prix	Japanese Grand Prix	Next race: 1998 Japanese Grand Prix
