= 1996 Japanese motorcycle Grand Prix =

(Japan) 1996 Japanese Grand Prix
Race details
- Race 3 of 15 races in the 1996 Grand Prix motorcycle racing season
- Date: 21 April 1996
- Official name: Marlboro Grand Prix of Japan
- Location: Suzuka Circuit
- Course: Permanent racing facility; 5.864 km (3.644 mi)

500cc
Pole position
- Rider: (Spain) Àlex Crivillé
- Time: 2:08.652
Fastest lap
- Rider: (Japan) Norick Abe
- Time: 2:09.089
Podium
- First: (Japan) Norick Abe
- Second: (Spain) Àlex Crivillé
- Third: (United States) Scott Russell

250cc
Pole position
- Rider: (Japan) Tetsuya Harada
- Time: 2:10.676
Fastest lap
- Rider: (Italy) Max Biaggi
- Time: 2:10.492
Podium
- First: (Italy) Max Biaggi
- Second: (Japan) Noriyasu Numata
- Third: (Japan) Daijiro Kato

125cc
Pole position
- Rider: (Japan) Noboru Ueda
- Time: 2:17.788
Fastest lap
- Rider: (Japan) Kazuto Sakata
- Time: 2:17.055
Podium
- First: (Japan) Masaki Tokudome
- Second: (Japan) Haruchika Aoki
- Third: (Japan) Noboru Ueda

The 1996 Japanese motorcycle Grand Prix was the third round of the 1996 Grand Prix motorcycle racing season. It took place on 21 April 1996 at the Suzuka Circuit.

== 500 cc classification ==
Pos.	Rider	Team	Manufacturer	Time/Retired	Points
1	(Japan) Norifumi Abe	Marlboro Yamaha Roberts	Yamaha	45:34.590	25
2	(Spain) Àlex Crivillé	Team Repsol Honda	Honda	+6.496	20
3	(United States) Scott Russell	Lucky Strike Suzuki	Suzuki	+7.140	16
4	(Japan) Tadayuki Okada	Team Repsol Honda	Honda	+11.724	13
5	(Australia) Daryl Beattie	Lucky Strike Suzuki	Suzuki	+13.670	11
6	(Australia) Mick Doohan	Team Repsol Honda	Honda	+19.858	10
7	(Italy) Doriano Romboni	IP Aprilia Racing Team	Aprilia	+22.334	9
8	(France) Jean-Michel Bayle	Marlboro Yamaha Roberts	Yamaha	+34.456	8
9	(Spain) Alberto Puig	Fortuna Honda Pons	Honda	+38.230	7
10	(Spain) Carlos Checa	Fortuna Honda Pons	Honda	+41.488	6
11	(Japan) Shinichi Itoh	Team Repsol Honda	Honda	+43.146	5
12	(United States) Kenny Roberts Jr.	Marlboro Yamaha Roberts	Yamaha	+1:01.450	4
13	(United Kingdom) Jeremy McWilliams	QUB Team Optimum	ROC Yamaha	+1:38.718	3
14	(Japan) Toshiyuki Arakaki	Padgett's Racing Team	Yamaha	+1:38.802	2
15	(United Kingdom) James Haydon	World Championship Motorsports	ROC Yamaha	+1:51.385	1
16	(United Kingdom) Eugene McManus	Millar Racing	Yamaha	+1:51.732	
17	(United Kingdom) Sean Emmett	Harris Grand Prix	Harris Yamaha	+1:52.087	
18	(Spain) Juan Borja	Elf 500 ROC	Elf	+1 Lap	
Ret	(Japan) Katsuaki Fujiwara	Lucky Strike Suzuki	Suzuki	Retirement	
Ret	(France) Frederic Protat	Soverex FP Racing	ROC Yamaha	Retirement	
Ret	(Italy) Luca Cadalora	Kanemoto Honda	Honda	Retirement	
Ret	(Belgium) Laurent Naveau	ELC Lease ROC	ROC Yamaha	Retirement	
Ret	(France) Jean Pierre Jeandat	Team Paton	Paton	Retirement	
Ret	(Japan) Takuma Aoki	Team HRC	Honda	Retirement	
Ret	(Switzerland) Adrien Bosshard	Elf 500 ROC	Elf 500	Retirement	
Ret	(Italy) Lucio Pedercini	Team Pedercini	ROC Yamaha	Retirement	
Ret	(Italy) Loris Capirossi	Marlboro Yamaha Roberts	Yamaha	Retirement	
Ret	(Brazil) Alex Barros	Honda Pileri	Honda	Retirement	

== 250 cc classification ==
Pos	Rider	Manufacturer	Time/Retired	Points
1	(Italy) Max Biaggi	Aprilia	41:36.486	25
2	(Japan) Noriyasu Numata	Suzuki	+13.560	20
3	(Japan) Daijiro Kato	Honda	+19.839	16
4	(France) Olivier Jacque	Honda	+20.000	13
5	(Japan) Tohru Ukawa	Honda	+20.446	11
6	(Japan) Nobuatsu Aoki	Honda	+24.751	10
7	(Japan) Kensuke Haga	Yamaha	+33.656	9
8	(Germany) Ralf Waldmann	Honda	+38.644	8
9	(Spain) Luis d'Antin	Honda	+44.416	7
10	(France) Jean-Philippe Ruggia	Honda	+44.542	6
11	(Japan) Takeshi Tsujimura	Honda	+1:01.951	5
12	(Germany) Jürgen Fuchs	Honda	+1:02.092	4
13	(Japan) Osamu Miyazaki	Aprilia	+1:02.484	3
14	(France) Regis Laconi	Honda	+1:02.778	2
15	(Japan) Yasumasa Hatakeyama	Honda	+1:02.907	1
16	(Argentina) Sebastian Porto	Aprilia	+1:03.014	
17	(Japan) Kyoji Nanba	Yamaha	+1:06.271	
18	(Italy) Roberto Locatelli	Aprilia	+1:14.852	
19	(Switzerland) Eskil Suter	Aprilia	+1:15.376	
20	(Spain) Sete Gibernau	Honda	+1:22.370	
21	(Italy) Luca Boscoscuro	Aprilia	+1:27.027	
22	(United Kingdom) Jamie Robinson	Aprilia	+1:30.186	
23	(Spain) José Luis Cardoso	Aprilia	+1:46.856	
24	(Switzerland) Olivier Petrucciani	Aprilia	+1:47.046	
25	(France) Cristophe Cogan	Honda	+1 Lap	
Ret	(Italy) Massimo Ottobre	Aprilia	Retirement	
Ret	(Netherlands) Jurgen vd Goorbergh	Honda	Retirement	
Ret	(Venezuela) José Barresi	Yamaha	Retirement	
Ret	(France) Christian Boudinot	Aprilia	Retirement	
Ret	(Italy) Cristiano Migliorati	Honda	Retirement	
Ret	(Japan) Tetsuya Harada	Yamaha	Retirement	
Ret	(Italy) Gianluigi Scalvini	Honda	Retirement	
Ret	(Italy) Davide Bulega	Aprilia	Retirement	

== 125 cc classification ==
Pos	Rider	Manufacturer	Time/Retired	Points
1	(Japan) Masaki Tokudome	Aprilia	41:44.002	25
2	(Japan) Haruchika Aoki	Honda	+1.232	20
3	(Japan) Noboru Ueda	Honda	+2.010	16
4	(Japan) Tomomi Manako	Honda	+8.126	13
5	(Germany) Manfred Geissler	Aprilia	+15.420	11
6	(Japan) Masao Azuma	Honda	+16.218	10
7	(Italy) Lucio Cecchinello	Honda	+16.744	9
8	(Spain) Jorge Martinez	Aprilia	+24.449	8
9	(United Kingdom) Darren Barton	Aprilia	+25.354	7
10	(Japan) Shigeru Ibaraki	Yamaha	+28.019	6
11	(Italy) Valentino Rossi	Aprilia	+37.643	5
12	(Italy) Stefano Perugini	Aprilia	+42.357	4
13	(Italy) Paolo Tessari	Honda	+46.900	3
14	(Czech Republic) Jaroslav Hules	Honda	+46.950	2
15	(Japan) Shinichi Sugaya	Honda	+1:08.334	1
16	(Spain) Josep Sarda	Honda	+1:08.368	
17	(Italy) Andrea Ballerini	Aprilia	+1:24.224	
18	(Italy) Stefano Cruciani	Aprilia	+1:25.803	
19	(Italy) Ivan Goi	Honda	+1:26.722	
20	(France) Frederic Petit	Honda	+1:31.487	
21	(Japan) Makoto Ono	Honda	+1:34.816	
Ret	(Japan) Akira Saito	Honda	Retirement	
Ret	(Japan) Yoshiaki Katoh	Yamaha	Retirement	
Ret	(Japan) Kazuhiro Takao	Honda	Retirement	
Ret	(Australia) Garry McCoy	Aprilia	Retirement	
Ret	(Japan) Youichi Ui	Yamaha	Retirement	
Ret	(Spain) Emilio Alzamora	Honda	Retirement	
Ret	(Germany) Dirk Raudies	Honda	Retirement	
Ret	(Japan) Kazuto Sakata	Aprilia	Retirement	
Ret	(Japan) Ken Ohashi	Honda	Retirement	
Ret	(Germany) Peter Öttl	Aprilia	Retirement	
Ret	(Italy) Gabriele Debbia	Yamaha	Retirement	

Previous race: 1996 Indonesian Grand Prix	FIM Grand Prix World Championship; 1996 season	Next race: 1996 Spanish Grand Prix
Previous race: 1995 Japanese Grand Prix	Japanese Grand Prix	Next race: 1997 Japanese Grand Prix
