= 2006 Italian motorcycle Grand Prix =

(Italy) 2006 Italian Grand Prix
Race details
- Race 6 of 17 races in the 2006 Grand Prix motorcycle racing season
- Date: 4 June 2006
- Official name: Gran Premio d'Italia Alice
- Location: Mugello Circuit
- Course: Permanent racing facility; 5.245 km (3.259 mi)

MotoGP
Pole position
- Rider: (Spain) Sete Gibernau
- Time: 1:48.969
Fastest lap
- Rider: (Italy) Loris Capirossi
- Time: 1:50.195
Podium
- First: (Italy) Valentino Rossi
- Second: (Italy) Loris Capirossi
- Third: (United States) Nicky Hayden

250cc
Pole position
- Rider: (Spain) Jorge Lorenzo
- Time: 1:53.787
Fastest lap
- Rider: (Italy) Roberto Locatelli
- Time: 1:54.749
Podium
- First: (Spain) Jorge Lorenzo
- Second: (San Marino) Alex de Angelis
- Third: (Italy) Andrea Dovizioso

125cc
Pole position
- Rider: (Czech Republic) Lukáš Pešek
- Time: 1:58.202
Fastest lap
- Rider: (Italy) Mattia Pasini
- Time: 1:58.677
Podium
- First: (Italy) Mattia Pasini
- Second: (Spain) Álvaro Bautista
- Third: (Czech Republic) Lukáš Pešek

The 2006 Italian motorcycle Grand Prix was the sixth race of the 2006 Motorcycle Grand Prix season. It took place on the weekend of 2–4 June 2006 at the Mugello Circuit.

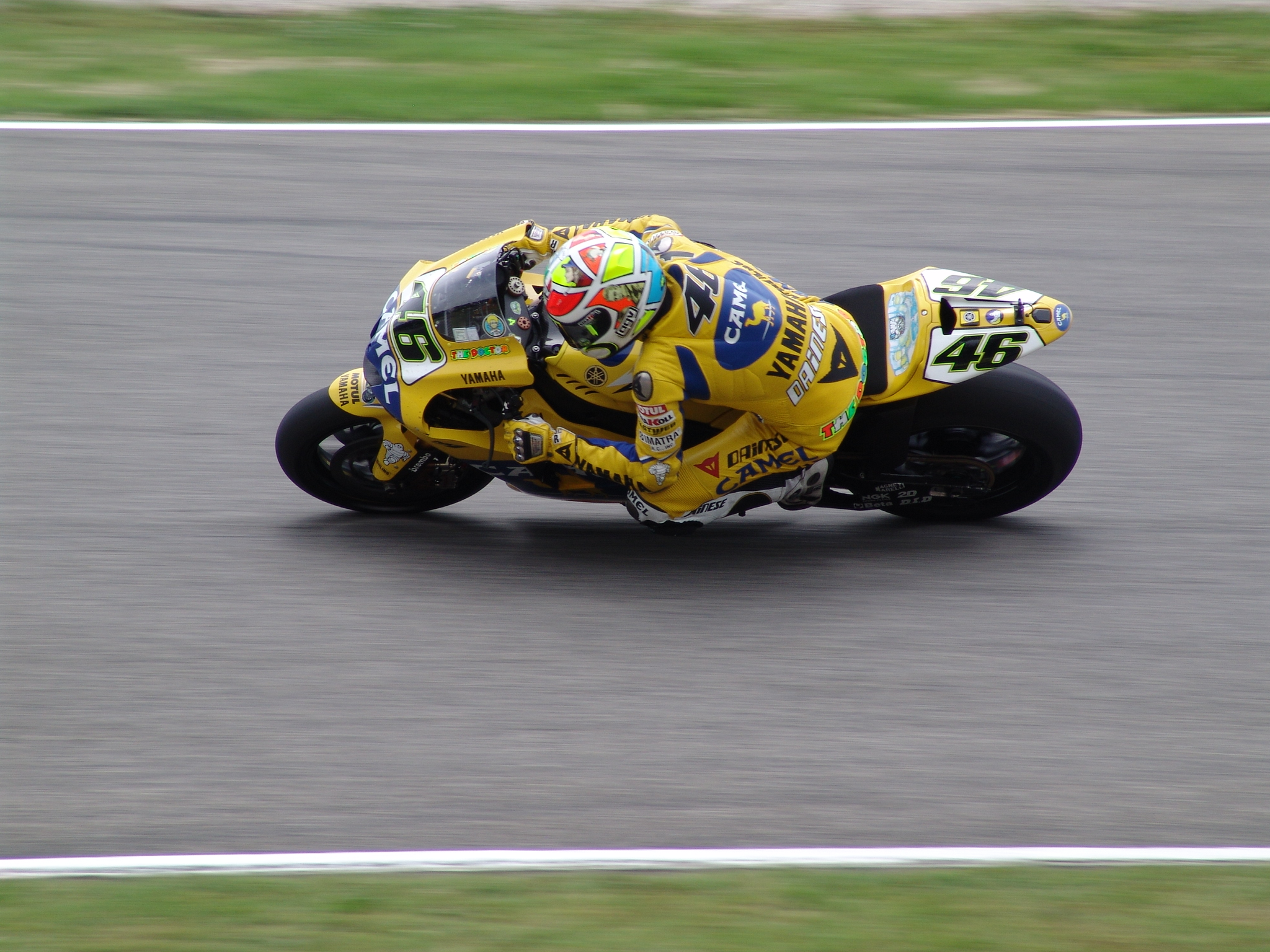
Valentino Rossi, riding his bike at the MotoGP race, which he went on to win.

== MotoGP classification ==
Pos.	No.	Rider	Team	Manufacturer	Laps	Time/Retired	Grid	Points
1	46	(Italy) Valentino Rossi	Camel Yamaha Team	Yamaha	23	42:39.610	3	25
2	65	(Italy) Loris Capirossi	Ducati Marlboro Team	Ducati	23	+0.575	2	20
3	69	(United States) Nicky Hayden	Repsol Honda Team	Honda	23	+0.735	4	16
4	26	(Spain) Dani Pedrosa	Repsol Honda Team	Honda	23	+2.007	8	13
5	15	(Spain) Sete Gibernau	Ducati Marlboro Team	Ducati	23	+3.070	1	11
6	33	(Italy) Marco Melandri	Fortuna Honda	Honda	23	+11.793	6	10
7	24	(Spain) Toni Elías	Fortuna Honda	Honda	23	+18.999	12	9
8	10	(United States) Kenny Roberts Jr.	Team Roberts	KR211V	23	+19.172	11	8
9	6	(Japan) Makoto Tamada	Konica Minolta Honda	Honda	23	+19.231	10	7
10	21	(United States) John Hopkins	Rizla Suzuki MotoGP	Suzuki	23	+19.821	7	6
11	56	(Japan) Shinya Nakano	Kawasaki Racing Team	Kawasaki	23	+19.863	5	5
12	5	(United States) Colin Edwards	Camel Yamaha Team	Yamaha	23	+30.678	14	4
13	17	(France) Randy de Puniet	Kawasaki Racing Team	Kawasaki	23	+37.198	16	3
14	71	(Australia) Chris Vermeulen	Rizla Suzuki MotoGP	Suzuki	23	+41.712	15	2
15	7	(Spain) Carlos Checa	Tech 3 Yamaha	Yamaha	23	+56.256	13	1
16	77	(United Kingdom) James Ellison	Tech 3 Yamaha	Yamaha	23	+1:13.387	17	
17	30	(Spain) José Luis Cardoso	Pramac d'Antin MotoGP	Ducati	22	+1 lap	19	
Ret	27	(Australia) Casey Stoner	Honda LCR	Honda	8	Accident	9	
Ret	66	(Germany) Alex Hofmann	Pramac d'Antin MotoGP	Ducati	8	Accident	18	

== 250 cc classification ==
Pos.	No.	Rider	Manufacturer	Laps	Time/Retired	Grid	Points
1	48	(Spain) Jorge Lorenzo	Aprilia	21	40:35.185	1	25
2	7	(San Marino) Alex de Angelis	Aprilia	21	+0.111	4	20
3	34	(Italy) Andrea Dovizioso	Honda	21	+0.320	5	16
4	55	(Japan) Yuki Takahashi	Honda	21	+0.334	2	13
5	6	(Spain) Alex Debón	Aprilia	21	+3.315	10	11
6	15	(Italy) Roberto Locatelli	Aprilia	21	+3.327	3	10
7	58	(Italy) Marco Simoncelli	Gilera	21	+7.930	6	9
8	14	(Australia) Anthony West	Aprilia	21	+26.048	14	8
9	73	(Japan) Shuhei Aoyama	Honda	21	+26.616	9	7
10	8	(Italy) Andrea Ballerini	Aprilia	21	+30.570	12	6
11	50	(France) Sylvain Guintoli	Aprilia	21	+32.854	16	5
12	54	(San Marino) Manuel Poggiali	KTM	21	+33.743	18	4
13	19	(Argentina) Sebastián Porto	Honda	21	+1:13.549	20	3
14	23	(Spain) Arturo Tizón	Honda	21	+1:16.159	19	2
15	37	(Argentina) Fabricio Perren	Honda	21	+1:18.533	24	1
16	64	(Italy) Omar Menghi	Aprilia	21	+1:48.079	31	
17	45	(United Kingdom) Dan Linfoot	Honda	21	+1:48.388	27	
18	85	(Italy) Alessio Palumbo	Aprilia	20	+1 lap	30	
19	17	(Germany) Franz Aschenbrenner	Aprilia	20	+1 lap	28	
Ret	36	(Colombia) Martín Cárdenas	Honda	18	Accident	17	
Ret	65	(Italy) Alessandro Brannetti	Honda	18	Retirement	25	
Ret	22	(Italy) Luca Morelli	Aprilia	13	Retirement	22	
Ret	67	(Sweden) Nicklas Cajback	Aprilia	12	Retirement	29	
Ret	16	(France) Jules Cluzel	Aprilia	8	Accident	21	
Ret	24	(Spain) Jordi Carchano	Aprilia	5	Retirement	26	
Ret	96	(Czech Republic) Jakub Smrž	Aprilia	4	Accident	8	
Ret	9	(Italy) Franco Battaini	Aprilia	2	Retirement	13	
Ret	21	(France) Arnaud Vincent	Honda	0	Accident	23	
Ret	25	(Italy) Alex Baldolini	Aprilia	0	Accident	15	
Ret	4	(Japan) Hiroshi Aoyama	KTM	0	Accident	11	
Ret	80	(Spain) Héctor Barberá	Aprilia	0	Retirement	7	

== 125 cc classification ==
Pos.	No.	Rider	Manufacturer	Laps	Time/Retired	Grid	Points
1	75	(Italy) Mattia Pasini	Aprilia	20	40:00.412	2	25
2	19	(Spain) Álvaro Bautista	Aprilia	20	+0.001	5	20
3	52	(Czech Republic) Lukáš Pešek	Derbi	20	+0.052	1	16
4	33	(Spain) Sergio Gadea	Aprilia	20	+1.203	15	13
5	55	(Spain) Héctor Faubel	Aprilia	20	+1.234	3	11
6	36	(Finland) Mika Kallio	KTM	20	+1.378	8	10
7	60	(Spain) Julián Simón	KTM	20	+2.303	12	9
8	14	(Hungary) Gábor Talmácsi	Honda	20	+13.320	7	8
9	1	(Switzerland) Thomas Lüthi	Honda	20	+13.337	14	7
10	24	(Italy) Simone Corsi	Gilera	20	+13.376	11	6
11	32	(Italy) Fabrizio Lai	Honda	20	+13.865	4	5
12	22	(Spain) Pablo Nieto	Aprilia	20	+14.759	6	4
13	6	(Spain) Joan Olivé	Aprilia	20	+17.288	21	3
14	8	(Italy) Lorenzo Zanetti	Aprilia	20	+29.463	17	2
15	71	(Japan) Tomoyoshi Koyama	Malaguti	20	+29.553	16	1
16	17	(Germany) Stefan Bradl	KTM	20	+34.174	23	
17	35	(Italy) Raffaele De Rosa	Aprilia	20	+35.827	19	
18	18	(Spain) Nicolás Terol	Derbi	20	+39.480	22	
19	38	(United Kingdom) Bradley Smith	Honda	20	+51.225	32	
20	90	(Japan) Hiroaki Kuzuhara	Honda	20	+1:15.251	33	
21	88	(Italy) Daniele Rossi	Honda	20	+1:18.215	31	
22	91	(Italy) Luca Verdini	Aprilia	20	+1:20.267	34	
23	87	(Italy) Roberto Lacalendola	Honda	20	+1:22.356	36	
24	53	(Italy) Simone Grotzkyj	Aprilia	20	+1:22.570	43	
25	45	(Hungary) Imre Tóth	Aprilia	20	+1:22.572	28	
26	26	(Switzerland) Vincent Braillard	Aprilia	20	+1:22.588	42	
27	13	(Italy) Dino Lombardi	Aprilia	20	+1:23.590	37	
28	20	(Italy) Roberto Tamburini	Aprilia	20	+1:54.909	35	
29	16	(Italy) Michele Conti	Honda	18	+2 laps	29	
Ret	63	(France) Mike Di Meglio	Honda	19	Accident	18	
Ret	41	(Spain) Aleix Espargaró	Honda	17	Retirement	13	
Ret	11	(Germany) Sandro Cortese	Honda	13	Accident	10	
Ret	10	(Spain) Ángel Rodríguez	Aprilia	9	Accident	9	
Ret	15	(Italy) Michele Pirro	Aprilia	9	Retirement	30	
Ret	89	(Italy) Nico Vivarelli	Honda	9	Retirement	40	
Ret	9	(Austria) Michael Ranseder	KTM	7	Accident	25	
Ret	44	(Czech Republic) Karel Abraham	Aprilia	4	Accident	27	
Ret	7	(France) Alexis Masbou	Malaguti	3	Retirement	24	
Ret	37	(Netherlands) Joey Litjens	Honda	3	Retirement	39	
Ret	23	(Italy) Lorenzo Baroni	Honda	2	Retirement	26	
Ret	12	(Italy) Federico Sandi	Aprilia	1	Accident	38	
DSQ	29	(Italy) Andrea Iannone	Aprilia	8	Black flag	20	
DSQ	43	(Spain) Manuel Hernández	Aprilia	2	Black flag	41	

== Championship standings after the race (MotoGP) ==
Below are the standings for the top five riders and constructors after round six has concluded.

Riders' Championship standings

Pos.	Rider	Points
1	(Italy) Loris Capirossi	99
2	(United States) Nicky Hayden	99
3	(Italy) Marco Melandri	89
4	(Spain) Dani Pedrosa	86
5	(Italy) Valentino Rossi	65

Constructors' Championship standings

Pos.	Constructor	Points
1	(Japan) Honda	131
2	(Italy) Ducati	99
3	(Japan) Yamaha	94
4	(Japan) Suzuki	41
5	(Japan) Kawasaki	37

- Note: Only the top five positions are included for both sets of standings.

Previous race: 2006 French Grand Prix	FIM Grand Prix World Championship; 2006 season	Next race: 2006 Catalan Grand Prix
Previous race: 2005 Italian Grand Prix	Italian motorcycle Grand Prix	Next race: 2007 Italian Grand Prix
