= 2004 Qatar motorcycle Grand Prix =

2004 Qatar Grand Prix
Race details
- Race 13 of 16 races in the 2004 Grand Prix motorcycle racing season
- Date: 2 October 2004
- Official name: Marlboro Grand Prix of Qatar
- Location: Losail International Circuit
- Course: Permanent racing facility; 5.380 km (3.343 mi)

MotoGP
Pole position
- Rider: (Spain) Carlos Checa
- Time: 1:58.988
Fastest lap
- Rider: (United States) Colin Edwards
- Time: 1:59.293 on lap 11
Podium
- First: (Spain) Sete Gibernau
- Second: (United States) Colin Edwards
- Third: (Spain) Rubén Xaus

250cc
Pole position
- Rider: (Argentina) Sebastián Porto
- Time: 2:02.710
Fastest lap
- Rider: (San Marino) Alex de Angelis
- Time: 2:03.015 on lap 4
Podium
- First: (Argentina) Sebastián Porto
- Second: (Spain) Daniel Pedrosa
- Third: (Japan) Hiroshi Aoyama

125cc
Pole position
- Rider: (Spain) Jorge Lorenzo
- Time: 2:09.644
Fastest lap
- Rider: (Spain) Jorge Lorenzo
- Time: 2:09.569 on lap 8
Podium
- First: (Spain) Jorge Lorenzo
- Second: (Italy) Andrea Dovizioso
- Third: (Spain) Álvaro Bautista

The 2004 Qatar motorcycle Grand Prix was the thirteenth round of the 2004 MotoGP Championship. It took place on the weekend of 30 September-2 October 2004 at the Losail International Circuit. It was the first running of the event.

This would be Sete Gibernau's 9th and final race win.

== MotoGP classification ==
| Pos. | No. | Rider | Team | Manufacturer | Laps | Time/Retired | Grid | Points |
|---|---|---|---|---|---|---|---|---|
| 1 | 15 | (Spain) Sete Gibernau | Telefónica Movistar Honda MotoGP | Honda | 22 | 44:01.741 | 3 | 25 |
| 2 | 45 | (United States) Colin Edwards | Telefónica Movistar Honda MotoGP | Honda | 22 | +1.315 | 10 | 20 |
| 3 | 11 | (Spain) Rubén Xaus | D'Antin MotoGP | Ducati | 22 | +23.844 | 7 | 16 |
| 4 | 4 | (Brazil) Alex Barros | Repsol Honda Team | Honda | 22 | +25.458 | 2 | 13 |
| 5 | 69 | (United States) Nicky Hayden | Repsol Honda Team | Honda | 22 | +31.417 | 4 | 11 |
| 6 | 3 | (Italy) Max Biaggi | Camel Honda | Honda | 22 | +39.209 | 24 (Note: A 6-second penalty was applied to his qualifying time due to a team member washing and brushing his grid slot; his original starting position (12th) remained unassigned.) | 10 |
| 7 | 17 | (Japan) Norifumi Abe | Fortuna Gauloises Tech 3 | Yamaha | 22 | +53.373 | 17 | 9 |
| 8 | 21 | (United States) John Hopkins | Team Suzuki MotoGP | Suzuki | 22 | +58.006 | 11 | 8 |
| 9 | 66 | (Germany) Alex Hofmann | Kawasaki Racing Team | Kawasaki | 22 | +1:04.320 | 18 | 7 |
| 10 | 6 | (Japan) Makoto Tamada | Camel Honda | Honda | 22 | +1:18.518 | 13 | 6 |
| 11 | 71 | (Japan) Yukio Kagayama | Team Suzuki MotoGP | Suzuki | 22 | +1:49.438 | 19 | 5 |
| 12 | 36 | (United Kingdom) James Haydon | Proton Team KR | Proton KR | 22 | +1:52.158 | 21 | 4 |
| 13 | 77 | (United Kingdom) James Ellison | WCM | Harris WCM | 22 | +1:53.900 | 22 | 3 |
| Ret | 7 | (Spain) Carlos Checa | Gauloises Fortuna Yamaha | Yamaha | 19 | Retirement | 1 | |
| Ret | 33 | (Italy) Marco Melandri | Fortuna Gauloises Tech 3 | Yamaha | 13 | Retirement | 16 | |
| Ret | 65 | (Italy) Loris Capirossi | Ducati Marlboro Team | Ducati | 13 | Retirement | 6 | |
| Ret | 99 | (United Kingdom) Jeremy McWilliams | MS Aprilia Racing | Aprilia | 12 | Retirement | 14 | |
| Ret | 50 | (United Kingdom) Neil Hodgson | D'Antin MotoGP | Ducati | 10 | Retirement | 15 | |
| Ret | 9 | (Japan) Nobuatsu Aoki | Proton Team KR | Proton KR | 6 | Accident | 20 | |
| Ret | 46 | (Italy) Valentino Rossi | Gauloises Fortuna Yamaha | Yamaha | 5 | Accident | 23 (Note: A 6-second penalty was applied to his qualifying time due to a team member laying down tyre rubber on his grid slot; his original starting position (8th) remained unassigned.) | |
| Ret | 12 | (Australia) Troy Bayliss | Ducati Marlboro Team | Ducati | 5 | Retirement | 9 | |
| Ret | 56 | (Japan) Shinya Nakano | Kawasaki Racing Team | Kawasaki | 3 | Retirement | 5 | |
| DNQ | 41 | (Japan) Youichi Ui | WCM | Harris WCM | | Did not qualify | | |

== 250 cc classification ==
| Pos. | No. | Rider | Manufacturer | Laps | Time/Retired | Grid | Points |
|---|---|---|---|---|---|---|---|
| 1 | 19 | (Argentina) Sebastián Porto | Aprilia | 20 | 41:17.343 | 1 | 25 |
| 2 | 26 | (Spain) Daniel Pedrosa | Honda | 20 | +1.614 | 2 | 20 |
| 3 | 73 | (Japan) Hiroshi Aoyama | Honda | 20 | +43.312 | 6 | 16 |
| 4 | 21 | (Italy) Franco Battaini | Aprilia | 20 | +45.127 | 7 | 13 |
| 5 | 10 | (Spain) Fonsi Nieto | Aprilia | 20 | +47.182 | 8 | 11 |
| 6 | 24 | (Spain) Toni Elías | Honda | 20 | +59.471 | 5 | 10 |
| 7 | 2 | (Italy) Roberto Rolfo | Honda | 20 | +1:11.413 | 16 | 9 |
| 8 | 6 | (Spain) Alex Debón | Honda | 20 | +1:22.120 | 11 | 8 |
| 9 | 9 | (France) Hugo Marchand | Aprilia | 20 | +1:22.162 | 23 | 7 |
| 10 | 11 | (Spain) Joan Olivé | Aprilia | 20 | +1:29.038 | 14 | 6 |
| 11 | 50 | (France) Sylvain Guintoli | Aprilia | 20 | +1:40.121 | 9 | 5 |
| 12 | 36 | (France) Erwan Nigon | Aprilia | 20 | +1:43.016 | 18 | 4 |
| 13 | 44 | (Japan) Taro Sekiguchi | Yamaha | 20 | +1:43.056 | 21 | 3 |
| 14 | 16 | (Sweden) Johan Stigefelt | Aprilia | 20 | +1:50.884 | 22 | 2 |
| 15 | 52 | (Spain) José David de Gea | Honda | 20 | +1:53.027 | 24 | 1 |
| 16 | 57 | (United Kingdom) Chaz Davies | Aprilia | 20 | +1:53.335 | 13 | |
| 17 | 96 | (Czech Republic) Jakub Smrž | Honda | 20 | +1:54.871 | 17 | |
| 18 | 25 | (Italy) Alex Baldolini | Aprilia | 20 | +2:25.588 | 15 | |
| 19 | 17 | (Germany) Klaus Nöhles | Honda | 19 | +1 lap | 26 | |
| Ret | 14 | (Australia) Anthony West | Aprilia | 19 | Retirement | 10 | |
| Ret | 51 | (San Marino) Alex de Angelis | Aprilia | 18 | Retirement | 3 | |
| Ret | 8 | (Japan) Naoki Matsudo | Yamaha | 15 | Retirement | 20 | |
| Ret | 28 | (Germany) Dirk Heidolf | Aprilia | 8 | Retirement | 19 | |
| Ret | 43 | (Czech Republic) Radomil Rous | Yamaha | 5 | Retirement | 27 | |
| Ret | 7 | (France) Randy de Puniet | Aprilia | 4 | Accident | 4 | |
| Ret | 33 | (Spain) Héctor Faubel | Aprilia | 2 | Retirement | 12 | |
| Ret | 42 | (France) Grégory Leblanc | Aprilia | 0 | Accident | 25 | |
| DNQ | 88 | (Hungary) Gergő Talmácsi | Yamaha | | Did not qualify | | |

== 125 cc classification ==
The race produced a dead heat for first place between Jorge Lorenzo and Andrea Dovizioso. After a photo finish could not separate the riders, Lorenzo was awarded first place on the basis that he set a faster laptime during the race.

| Pos. | No. | Rider | Manufacturer | Laps | Time/Retired | Grid | Points |
|---|---|---|---|---|---|---|---|
| 1 | 48 | (Spain) Jorge Lorenzo | Derbi | 18 | 39:11.620 | 1 | 25 |
| 2 | 34 | (Italy) Andrea Dovizioso | Honda | 18 | +0.000 | 2 | 20 |
| 3 | 19 | (Spain) Álvaro Bautista | Aprilia | 18 | +4.018 | 12 | 16 |
| 4 | 36 | (Finland) Mika Kallio | KTM | 18 | +18.753 | 10 | 13 |
| 5 | 32 | (Italy) Fabrizio Lai | Gilera | 18 | +35.458 | 16 | 11 |
| 6 | 22 | (Spain) Pablo Nieto | Aprilia | 18 | +37.890 | 6 | 10 |
| 7 | 10 | (Spain) Julián Simón | Honda | 18 | +39.023 | 8 | 9 |
| 8 | 23 | (Italy) Gino Borsoi | Aprilia | 18 | +39.409 | 22 | 8 |
| 9 | 54 | (Italy) Mattia Pasini | Aprilia | 18 | +42.901 | 15 | 7 |
| 10 | 6 | (Italy) Mirko Giansanti | Aprilia | 18 | +42.918 | 9 | 6 |
| 11 | 21 | (Germany) Steve Jenkner | Aprilia | 18 | +47.425 | 3 | 5 |
| 12 | 3 | (Spain) Héctor Barberá | Aprilia | 18 | +48.015 | 14 | 4 |
| 13 | 12 | (Switzerland) Thomas Lüthi | Honda | 18 | +52.652 | 13 | 3 |
| 14 | 50 | (Italy) Andrea Ballerini | Aprilia | 18 | +1:03.092 | 21 | 2 |
| 15 | 42 | (Italy) Gioele Pellino | Aprilia | 18 | +1:06.804 | 27 | 1 |
| 16 | 7 | (Italy) Stefano Perugini | Gilera | 18 | +1:07.043 | 18 | |
| 17 | 52 | (Czech Republic) Lukáš Pešek | Honda | 18 | +1:20.718 | 30 | |
| 18 | 33 | (Spain) Sergio Gadea | Aprilia | 18 | +1:23.808 | 19 | |
| 19 | 26 | (Germany) Dario Giuseppetti | Honda | 18 | +1:26.869 | 24 | |
| 20 | 15 | (Italy) Roberto Locatelli | Aprilia | 18 | +1:28.482 | 5 | |
| 21 | 45 | (Italy) Lorenzo Zanetti | Aprilia | 18 | +1:29.779 | 25 | |
| 22 | 28 | (Spain) Jordi Carchano | Aprilia | 18 | +1:37.395 | 26 | |
| 23 | 8 | (Italy) Manuel Manna | Malaguti | 18 | +1:37.540 | 31 | |
| 24 | 16 | (Netherlands) Raymond Schouten | Honda | 18 | +1:38.401 | 29 | |
| 25 | 25 | (Hungary) Imre Tóth | Aprilia | 18 | +1:54.617 | 28 | |
| Ret | 24 | (Italy) Simone Corsi | Honda | 15 | Retirement | 11 | |
| Ret | 14 | (Hungary) Gábor Talmácsi | Malaguti | 9 | Retirement | 17 | |
| Ret | 27 | (Australia) Casey Stoner | KTM | 8 | Retirement | 4 | |
| Ret | 31 | (Italy) Max Sabbatani | Honda | 2 | Retirement | 32 | |
| Ret | 47 | (Spain) Ángel Rodríguez | Derbi | 0 | Accident | 23 | |
| Ret | 66 | (Finland) Vesa Kallio | Aprilia | 0 | Accident | 20 | |
| DNS | 58 | (Italy) Marco Simoncelli | Aprilia | 0 | Did not start | 7 | |
| DNQ | 9 | (Czech Republic) Markéta Janáková | Honda | | Did not qualify | | |
| DNQ | 63 | (France) Mike Di Meglio | Aprilia | | Did not qualify | | |

== Championship standings after the race (MotoGP) ==
Below are the standings for the top five riders and constructors after round thirteen has concluded.

Riders' Championship standings

| Pos. | Rider | Points |
|---|---|---|
| 1 | (Italy) Valentino Rossi | 229 |
| 2 | (Spain) Sete Gibernau | 215 |
| 3 | (Italy) Max Biaggi | 168 |
| 4 | (United States) Colin Edwards | 131 |
| 5 | (Brazil) Alex Barros | 128 |

Constructors' Championship standings

| Pos. | Constructor | Points |
|---|---|---|
| 1 | (Japan) Honda | 295 |
| 2 | (Japan) Yamaha | 253 |
| 3 | (Italy) Ducati | 127 |
| 4 | (Japan) Kawasaki | 74 |
| 5 | (Japan) Suzuki | 66 |

- Note: Only the top five positions are included for both sets of standings.

== Notes ==
| Previous race: 2004 Japanese Grand Prix | FIM Grand Prix World Championship; 2004 season | Next race: 2004 Malaysian Grand Prix |
| Previous race: None | Qatar motorcycle Grand Prix | Next race: 2005 Qatar Grand Prix |
