= Àlex Crivillé =

Spanish motorcycle racer

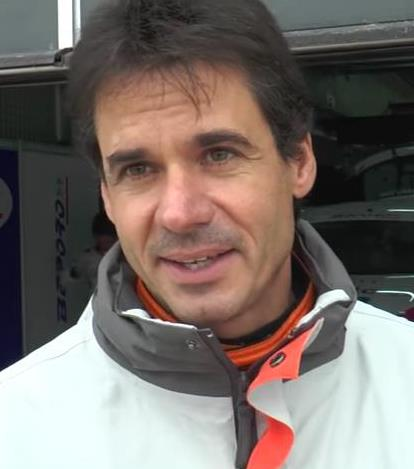
- Crivillé in 2016
- Nationality: Spanish
- Born: Àlex Crivillé Tapias; 4 March 1970 (age 56); Barcelona, Spain
Motorcycle racing career statistics
Grand Prix motorcycle racing
Active years	1987–2001
First race	1987 80cc Spanish Grand Prix
Last race	2001 500cc Brazilian Grand Prix
First win	1989 125cc Australian Grand Prix
Last win	2000 500cc French Grand Prix
Team(s)	Derbi, Cobas Rotax, Yamaha, Honda
Championships	2; 1989: 125cc 1999: 500cc
Starts / Wins / Podiums / Poles / F. laps / Points; 193 / 20 / 66 / 12 / 20 / 2012

Àlex Crivillé Tapias (born 4 March 1970) is a Spanish former professional motorcycle racer. He competed in the FIM Grand Prix motorcycle racing world championships from 1987 to 2001, most prominently as a member of the Honda factory racing team. In 1992 he became the first Spaniard to win a 500cc Grand Prix and, in 1999 he became the first Spaniard to win the 500cc World Championship.

== Biography ==
Crivillé was born in Barcelona, Spain. He falsified his age in order to start racing at 14 in 1985, the minimum age for a license being 15 in Spain. In that year, he won the Criterium Solo Moto, a national series for 75 cc Honda streetbikes.

== 80cc career ==
=== Derbi (1987–1988) ===
1987

Crivillé started his international career in the now-defunct 80cc World Championship with the Derbi team. At his debut race in the class, he immediately impressed by qualifying third on Saturday and taking second place, as well as the fastest lap, on Sunday in Spain. He then participated in two more races, the Dutch and Portuguese rounds, where he qualified fifth and second respectively, but retired from both of them.

Crivillé finished eleventh in the championship with 12 points, 117 points behind the champion Jorge Martínez and 74 points behind runner-up Manuel Herreros.

1988

In 1988, Crivillé continued to impress. In the Spanish and Expo grands prix, he finished third two consecutive times, taking the fastest lap on the first race. At the Nations round, he finished just off the podium in fourth but scored a second place podium in Germany. In the Netherlands, he retired but finished on a high note by taking two more third place podium finishes in Yugoslavia and Czechoslovakia.

Crivillé finished second in the championship with 90 points, 47 points behind the champion Jorge Martínez.

== 125cc career ==
=== Derbi (1988) ===
1988

Besides the 80cc, Crivillé also raced in the 125cc class, predominantly the races that were not held in the 80cc class. At the Belgian GP, he retired. At the British round, he scored his first points by finishing ninth but failed to score any more points when he retired from the Swedish race and only finished seventeenth at the Czechoslovak grand prix.

Crivillé finished thirty first in the championship with seven points, 190 points behind the champion Jorge Martínez and 161 points behind runner-up Ezio Gianola.

=== JJ Cobas (1989) ===
1989

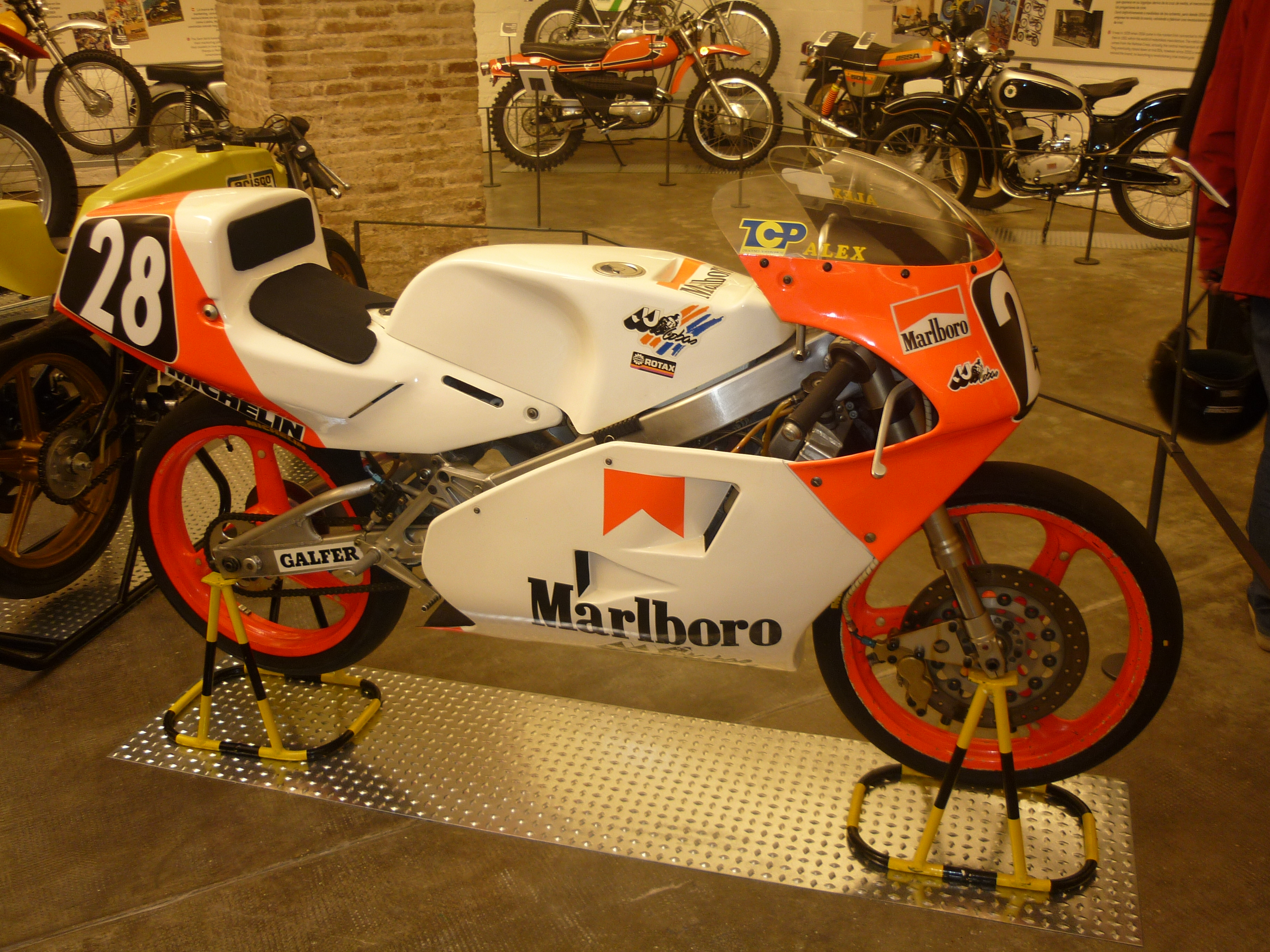
The JJ Cobas bike in which Crivillé won his first ever world championship in the 125cc class in 1989.

For the 1989 season, Crivillé moved to the JJ Cobas team of grand prix mechanic and constructor Antonio Cobas.

While the team opted to skip the opening round in Japan, Crivillé scored back-to-back wins in Australia and Spain, scoring his first ever podium in the latter. He retired at the Nations GP but took the fastest lap.

Another win followed at round five in Germany, with a third place (and fastest lap) in Austria and a second place in the Netherlands as well.

Another retirement followed at the Belgian GP, but Crivillé responded with two consecutive second places in France and Great Britain and two poles in the last two races in Sweden and Czechoslovakia, which he went on to win.

Crivillé won the championship with 166 points to Spaan's 152, with Ezio Gianola third with 138 points. He clinched his first, and only, 125cc title.

== 250cc career ==
=== Yamaha (1990) ===
1990

In 1990, he stepped up to the 250 cc class to race for Giacomo Agostini's team.

Crivillé skipped the opening round in Japan for the second successive year, and started his year with a retirement in the United States. At the next round in Spain, he finished seventh, before recording another retirement in the Nations race. He finished eleventh in Germany but went on to score yet another retirement in Austria.

He finished in seventh position in Yugoslavia but went on to register back-to-back retirements at the Dutch and Belgian rounds. Crivillé finished the season on a high note by scoring a flurry of points on the closing rounds - eighth in France and Great Britain, ninth in Sweden, seventh in Czechoslovakia, his season best result of fifth in Hungary and sixth in Australia.

Crivillé finished eleventh in the championship with 76 points, 147 points behind the champion John Kocinski and 132 points behind runner-up Carlos Cardús.

=== JJ Cobas (1991) ===
1991

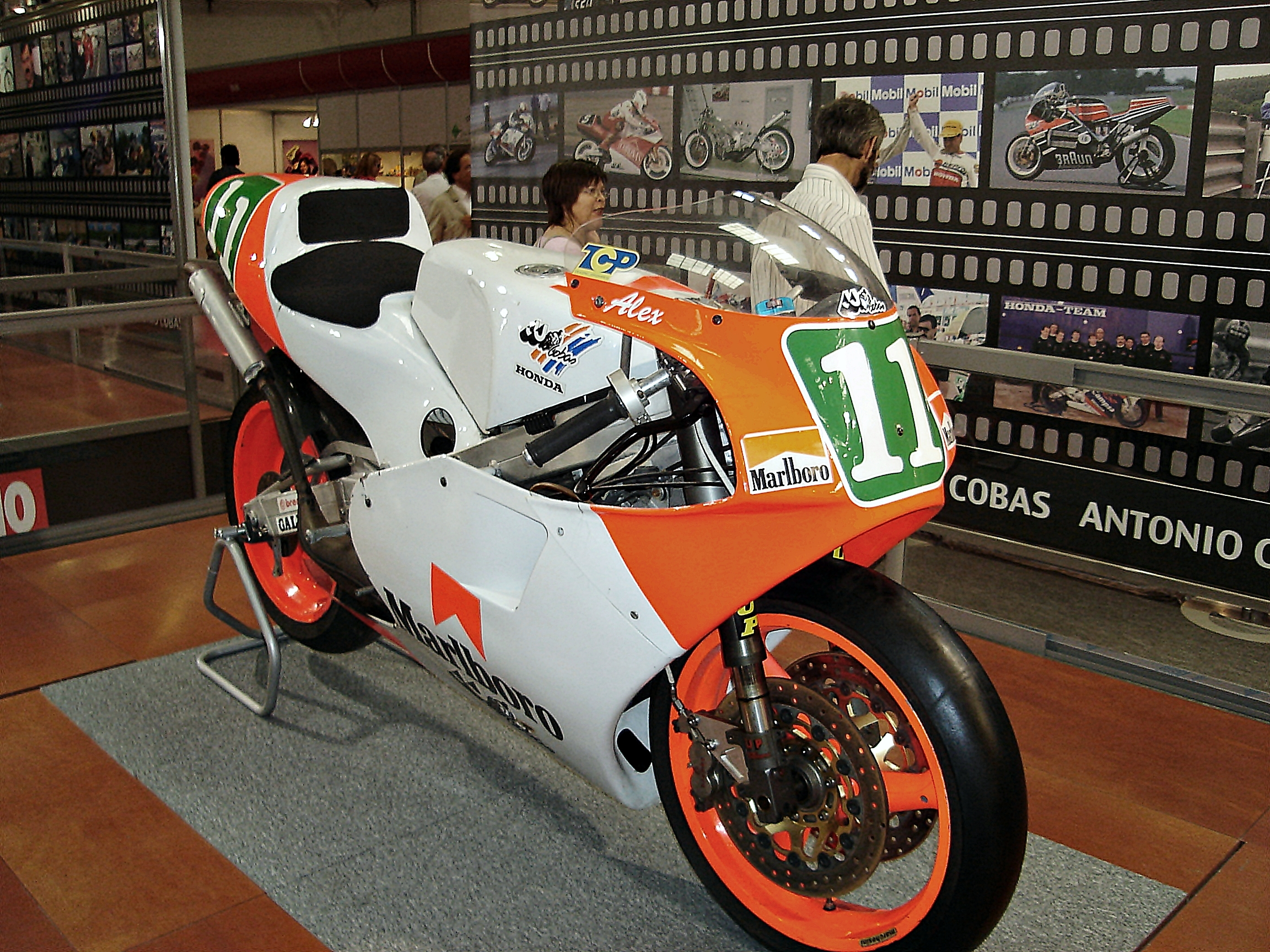
The JJ Cobas bike that Crivillé rode in the 250cc class in 1991.

After a lackluster season in Yamaha in 1990, Crivillé went back to the JJ Cobas team for 1991.

He did not start the season well, retiring twice in Japan and Australia. Only at round three in the United States did Crivillé score his first points with an eighth-place finish. Two more retirements followed in Spain and Italy, with seventh and ninth-place finishes in Germany and Austria.

Back-to-back retirements followed once again at the European and Dutch rounds. In France, Crivillé finished seventh, two more retirements followed in Great Britain and San Marino. He scored his season best result of fifth at the Czechoslovak grand prix, retired again at the Vitesse du Mans round - his ninth retirement of the year - and finished sixth at the final round in Malaysia.

Crivillé finished thirteenth in the championship with 51 points, 186 points behind the champion Luca Cadalora and 169 points behind runner-up Helmut Bradl. He recorded nine DNFs - the highest amount in his career - and never managed to finish a race on the podium or win in his two years in the 250cc class.

== 500cc career ==
=== Honda (1992–2001) ===
1992

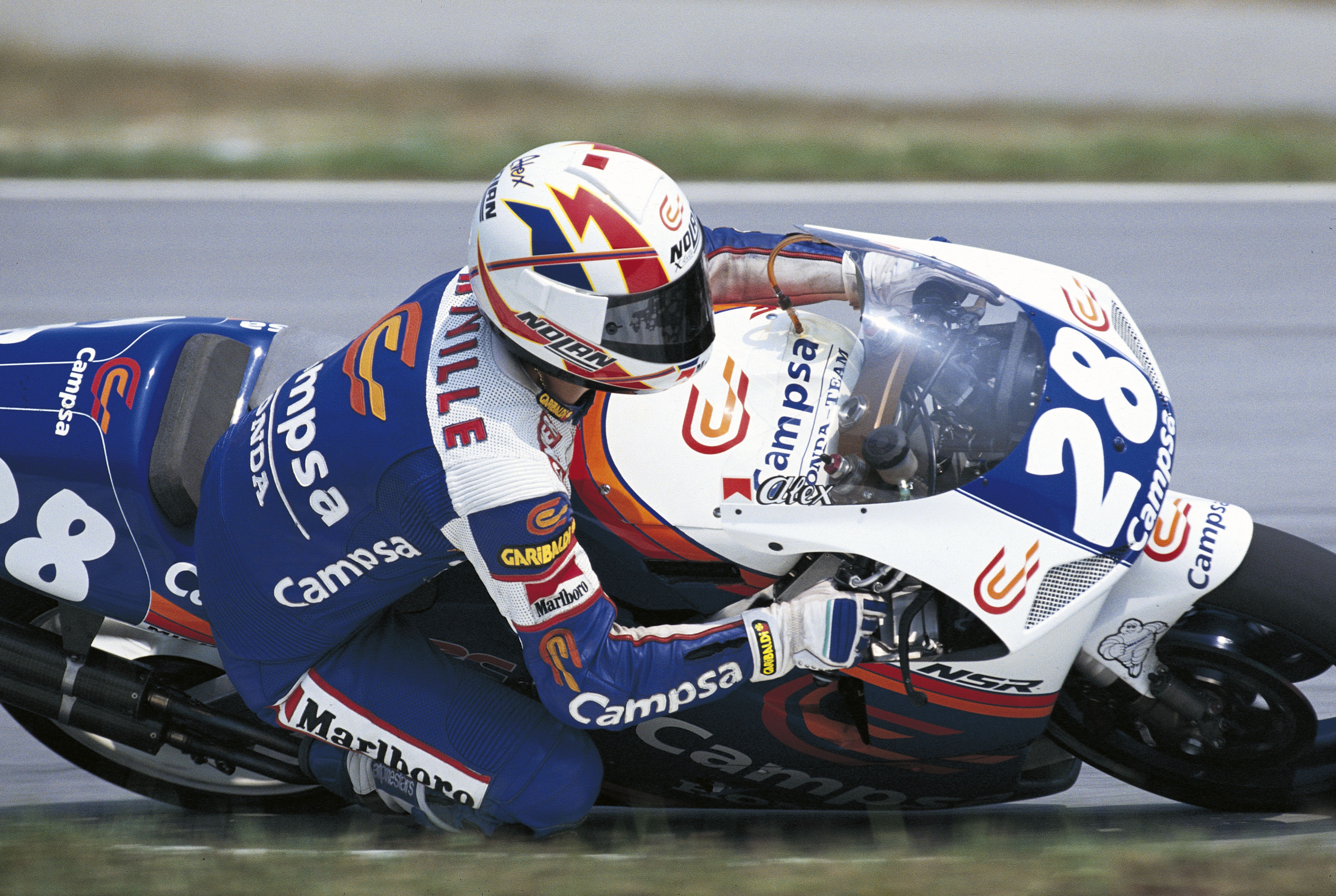
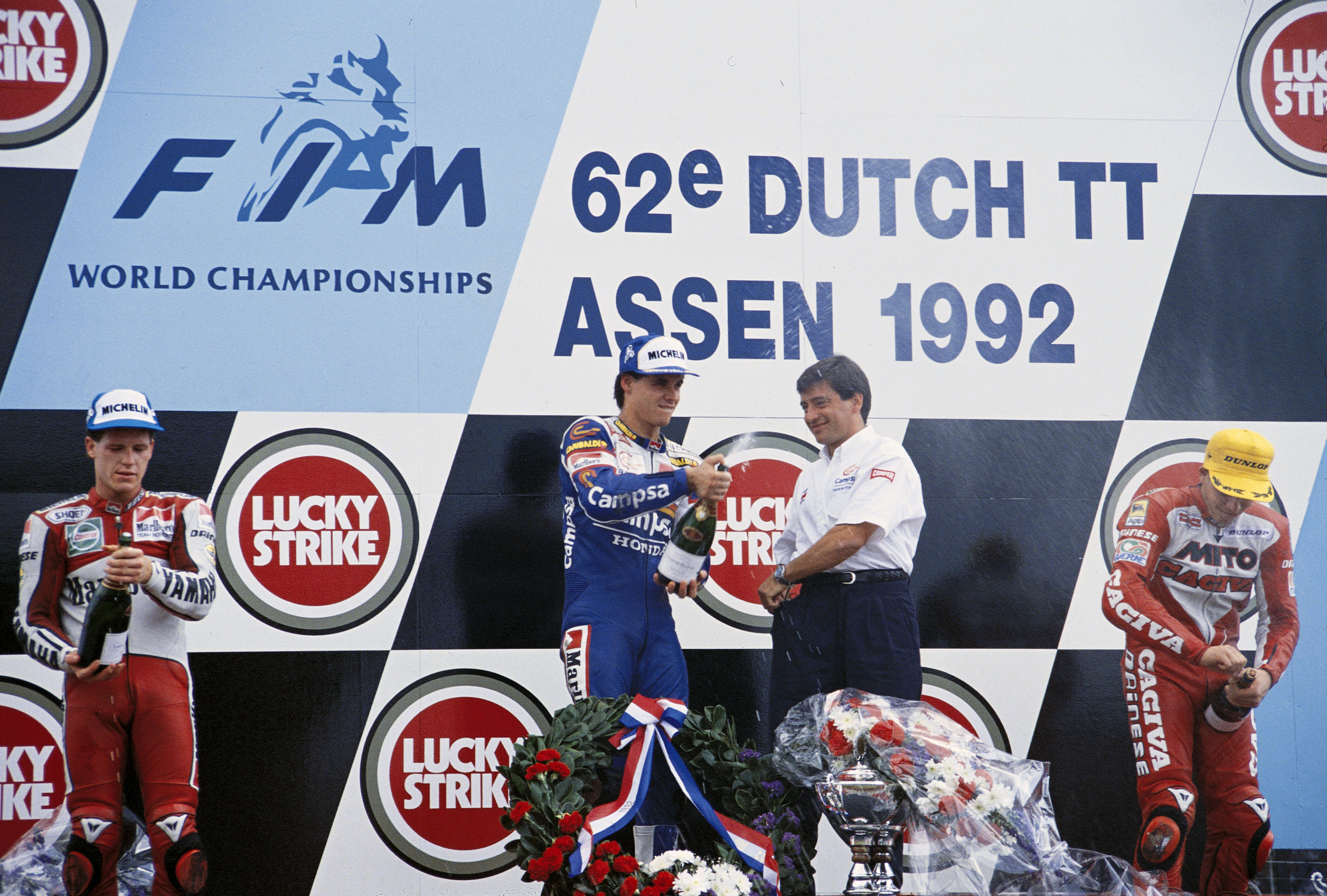
Crivillé at the Malaysian and Dutch Grand Prix. He took his first podium and win at both races.

Crivillé moved up to the 500cc class after two seasons in the 250cc in which he struggled, joining the newly formed Pons Racing team for the 1992 season.

Initially he retired on the opening round in Japan, but scored his first points at the second race in Australia with a seventh-place finish. In only his third race in the class, he took his first podium at the Malaysian grand prix, behind Mick Doohan and Wayne Rainey.

At the next race in Spain, he registered his first retirement but scored more points by finishing eighth in Italy. Another retirement followed in Europe, but Crivillé finished off the podium in fourth after battling with Wayne Gardner for third at the German round.

At the Dutch GP, Crivillé made history by winning the race, becoming the first ever Spaniard to win a race in the 500cc class. After a battle with John Kocinski and Alex Barros in the final few laps, Crivillé managed to stay ahead and cross the line 0.762 seconds ahead of Kocinski.

After his win in Assen, his low point came at the next round in Hungary. Crivillé was disqualified because he pitted to switch bikes on a drying track, something that was not allowed at the time. Two more retirements followed at the French and British rounds, with a sixth and seventh-place finish in Brazil and South Africa respectively.

Crivillé finished eighth in the championship with 59 points, 81 points behind the champion Wayne Rainey and 77 points behind runner-up Mick Doohan.

1993

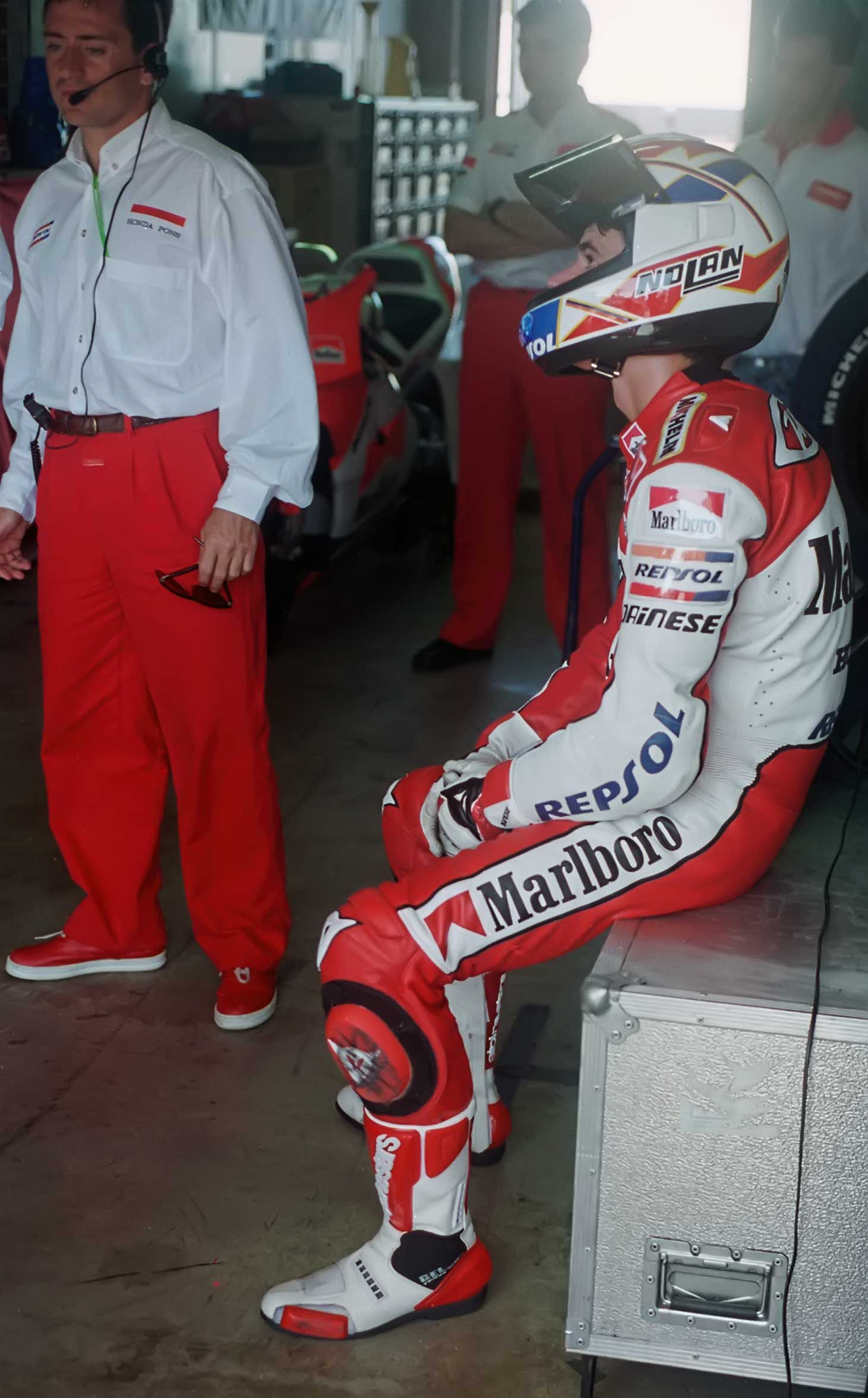
Crivillé at the opening round in Australia, where he went on to finish sixth.

In 1993, Crivillé stayed with the Honda Pons team.

In the first three races of the season - the Australian, Malaysian and Japanese rounds - he finished sixth once and fifth twice. At round four in Spain, he took his first podium of the season in the form of a third place.

Crivillé's first retirement of the season came in Austria, followed up by a fourth place in Germany and a second third place podium finish in the Netherlands, the same venue where he won his very first race a year earlier.

Three consecutive retirements followed after his third place at Assen, namely at the European, San Marino and British rounds. The final four rounds were more positive, with Crivillé finishing eighth in the Czech Republic, sixth in Italy, seventh in the United States and fourth at the final race of the season, the FIM round.

Crivillé finished eighth in the championship with 117 points, 131 points behind the champion Kevin Schwantz and 97 points behind runner-up Wayne Rainey.

1994

For the 1994 season, Crivillé moved to the Factory Honda team, riding alongside Mick Doohan and Shinichi Ito. He became the first Spanish rider to ride for the Factory Honda team.

Crivillé started the season off well by taking an array of points in the opening rounds - sixth in Australia, eighth in Malaysia, seventh in Japan and fifth in Spain. However, he stood in the shadow of Doohan because he already had won two races and an additional second-place podium.

At the fifth round of the season in Austria, Crivillé scored his first podium of the season in the form of third place. At the German round, he finished fourth but took another third-place podium in the Netherlands.

Crivillé's first retirement arrived at the Italy but took his third and final podium of the year at the French GP. Further points came at the next two rounds in Great Britain and the Czech Republic in the form of sixth and fourth-place finishes. He did not start the United States grand prix due to a hand injury he sustained during practice. At the final two rounds - the Argentine and European rounds - he finished seventh and fourth.

Crivillé finished sixth in the championship with 144 points, 173 points behind the champion and teammate Mick Doohan and 30 points behind runner-up Luca Cadalora.

1995

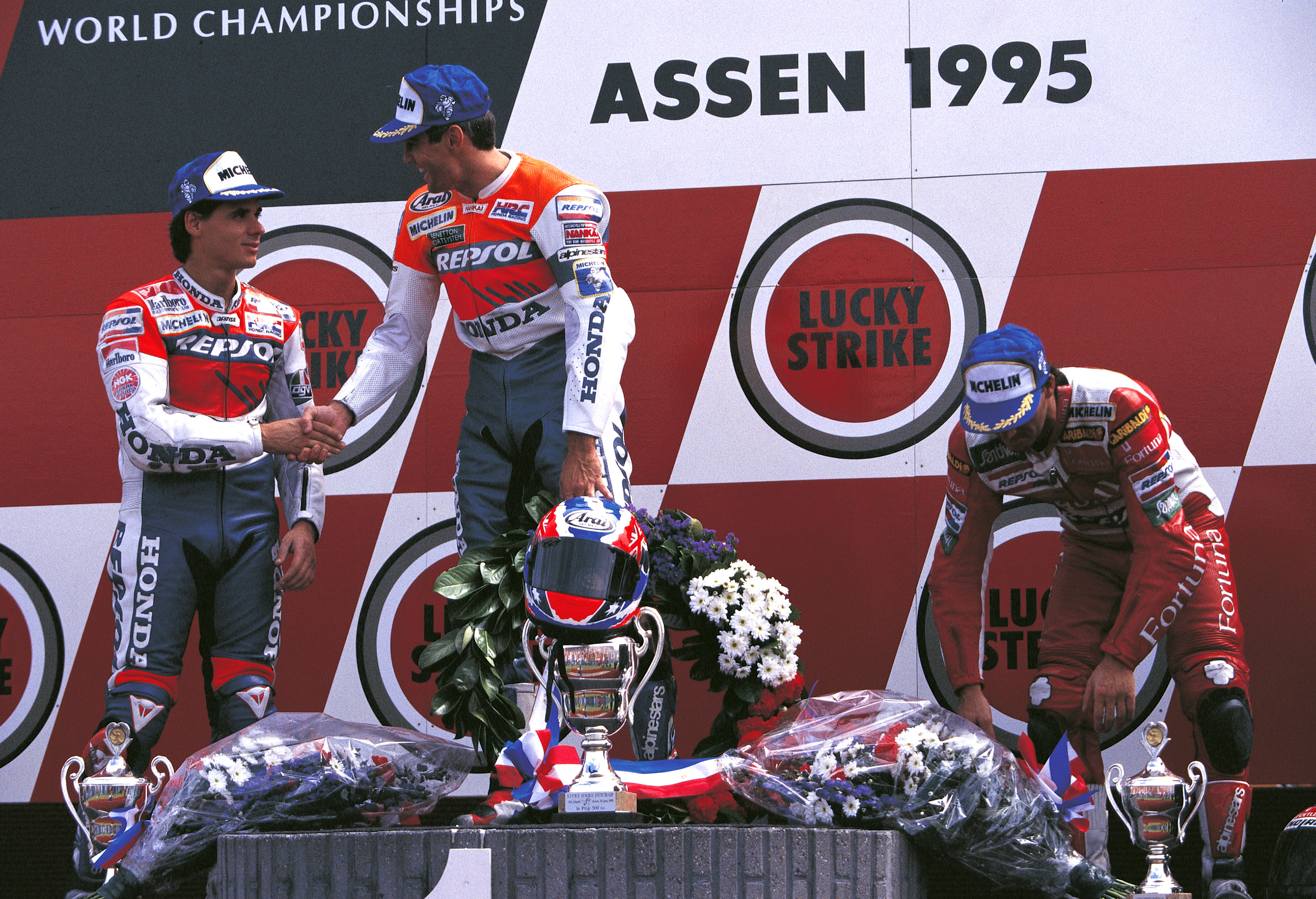
Crivillé at round seven in Assen, where he narrowly lost out on the victory to teammate Mick Doohan.

Crivillé stayed with the Factory Honda team, who now found a new major sponsor: Repsol.

Crivillé started off the season well, taking back-to-back podiums in the form of third-place finishes, at the opening round in Australia and at the second race in Malaysia. In Japan, he retired for the first time this season whilst his teammate Mick Doohan took second place. In Spain he went on to take another third-place podium.

In Germany, Crivillé finished off the podium in fourth and at the Italy he finished fifth, whilst teammate Doohan won the race. At round seven in the Netherlands, Crivillé took his first-ever 500cc pole position on Saturday. On Sunday, he battled hard with teammate Doohan and Alberto Puig in the closing stages of the race. On the last lap, Crivillé overtook Puig by outbreaking him, moving him from third up to second. However, Crivillé was never able to attack Doohan and thus he crossed the line, 0.114 behind him.

After his second-place podium finish in Assen, Crivillé retired once more in France. In Great Britain, he took his fourth third-place finish of the year. Further points came at the following rounds in the Czech Republic, Rio de Janeiro (sixth on both occasions) and Argentina, where he finished fourth.

After his teammate Doohan already had clinched the title in Buenos Aires, Crivillé won the last race of the season out in Europe, which was held at the Circuit de Catalunya or his 'backyard'. On Saturday, bike problems prevented Crivillé from posting a proper lap time with his main bike and he was forced to switch to his less optimal alternative one, pushing him back to seventh position whilst teammates Doohan started second and sixth on the grid. On Sunday, he moved up from seventh to fourth as the race went on. When he overtook another rider for third, he passed the grandstands where Spanish fans were cheering him on, shouting "Crivi, Crivi, Crivi!" in the process. After overtaking Loris Capirossi for then second place, he hunt down first place Carlos Checa who was suffering from tyre wear. While Crivillé was closing down the gap, Checa slid out of contention when his tyres gave up, gifting the lead to the Catalan. However, Crivillé himself began to suffer from the same tyre wear problems in the closing laps, allowing teammate Shinichi Ito and Capirossi to close the gap. On the final lap, Ito tried to attack but Crivillé defended by outbreaking him. A second attack followed at turn 10, the "La Caixa" corner, with Ito taking the lead, running wide and so giving it back to Crivillé. Crivillé eventually crossed the line 0.160 seconds ahead of Ito, becoming the first Catalan to win on home soil.

Crivillé finished fourth in the championship with 166 points, 82 points behind the champion and teammate Mick Doohan and 49 points behind runner-up Daryl Beattie.

1996

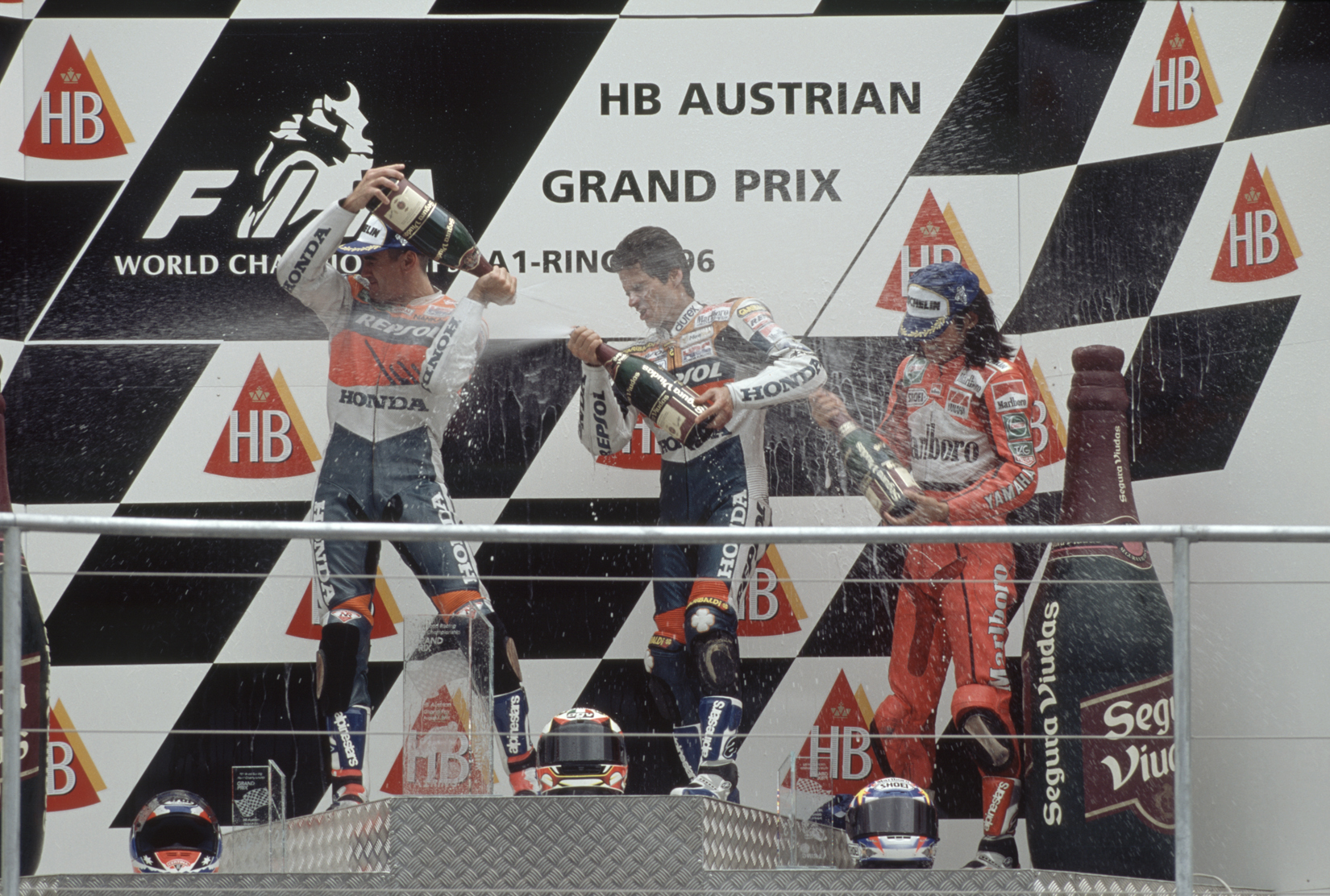
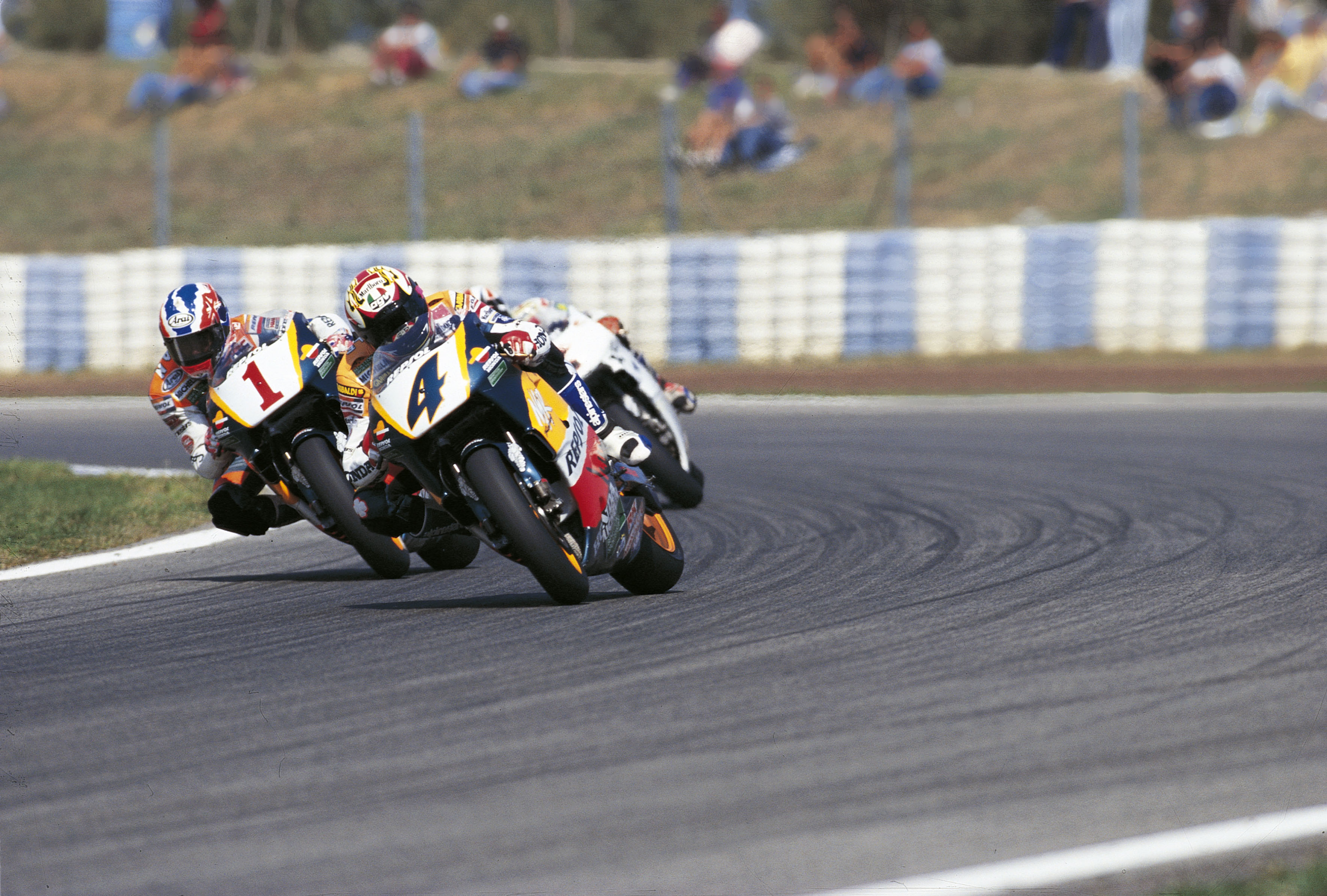
Crivillé on the podium at the Austrian race, and battling during the Catalan Grand Prix, where he finished third.

With Crivillé performing well in 1995, expectations were high in 1996.

Initially, Crivillé retired on the opening round in Malaysia and had only finished fourth in Indonesia whilst teammate Mick Doohan won the race. However, at the Japanese race, he took his first pole of the season on Saturday and finished second on Sunday. In Spain however, he recorded his second retirement of the year. Initially taking the lead of the race from polesitter and teammate Doohan, as well as Luca Cadalora (who had a better start and thus led into turn one), Crivillé pulled a gap after a short battle with Cadalora, whose tyres began to fade. Crivillé then led for much of the race but Doohan was closing in at the final laps. On the last lap, spectators who already thought the race had ended, invaded the track around turn nine (the "Curva Àngel Nieto"), distracting Crivillé enough to allow Doohan to get back right on his tail going into the last couple of corners. Going into the last hairpin before the start-finish straight, Doohan went to the inside, going side-by-side with Crivillé. The pair did not touch, but Crivillé lost the rear whilst trying to accelerate, highsiding out of contention on the very last corner of the race, allowing Doohan to win the race as a result.

After Jerez however, Crivillé responded well by scoring three consecutive second-place finishes. In Italy, he battled with teammate Mick Doohan for much of the race but ultimately came short and finished 0.726 seconds behind the Australian. Crivillé did take the fastest lap, his first of the year. In France, he took another pole position on Saturday but once again lost out to Doohan on Sunday, but managing to score back-to-back fastest laps in the process. In the Netherlands, Crivillé took his second consecutive pole on Friday, but it was Doohan once more who prevailed in the Saturday race after a battle between the pair.

At the German GP, Crivillé took his third consecutive pole of the season on Saturday. On Sunday, Crivillé finished behind Doohan once more after a battle between him, Doohan and Luca Cadalora ended in the Italian winning the race. In Great Britain, Doohan beat Crivillé once more when he won the race, with the Catalan finishing second.

Fortunes turned for Crivillé in the following two rounds, however. In Austria, Doohan lead in the closing laps, with Crivillé closing in, but unable to make a move. At turn 8, Doohan made a small mistake, allowing Crivillé to pass him going into turn 9 (the "Jochen Rindt" corner). Doohan tried a late lunge to retake the place but failed and ran wide, allowing Crivillé to pass him going into turn 10 (the "A1" corner) to win the race with 0.500 seconds from his teammate. Crivillé won the next race in the Czech Republic in a similar way. Doohan leads in the closing laps, but Crivillé was catching him. On the last lap, the pair battled for the lead, with Crivillé making a lunge but failing, running wide and giving the lead back to Doohan. Crivillé then shadowed him, taking different lines in the process. As they came out of turn 14 and went into turn 15, Crivillé ran a wider line, allowing him to get more traction out of the corner, running side-by-side with Doohan until the finish. Both were confused because it was unclear who won, but once the scoreboard showed that Crivillé had won, he started to cheer. Crivillé beat Doohan by just 0.002 seconds, a record that still stands today. He also took the fastest lap on both venues.

Crivillé and Doohan continued to battle at the City of Imola grand prix, this time with Doohan winning the race by a margin of 0.104 seconds over Crivillé. Tadayuki Okada completed the podium, making it a full Factory Honda podium. Crivillé also took the fastest lap. In 1996 Catalan motorcycle Grand Prix|Cataluña, his home GP, finished third after battling yet again with teammates Doohan and Tadayuki Okada, as well as Luca Cadalora in the closing stages of the race. His final podium came in the form of second place at the Rio de Janeiro round, losing out to Doohan again by 0.465 seconds. At the final round in Australia, Crivillé took the final pole position of the season, as well as his final fastest lap of the year, but only managed to finish sixth after colliding with Doohan on the final lap after Crivillé tried to overtake him, causing both of them to fall in the process. Doohan later blamed his teammate for the incident, citing that "He tried to go around the outside but I shut the door on him. He left his move too late".

Crivillé finished second in the championship with 245 points, 64 points behind the champion and teammate Mick Doohan and 77 points ahead of Luca Cadalora.

1997

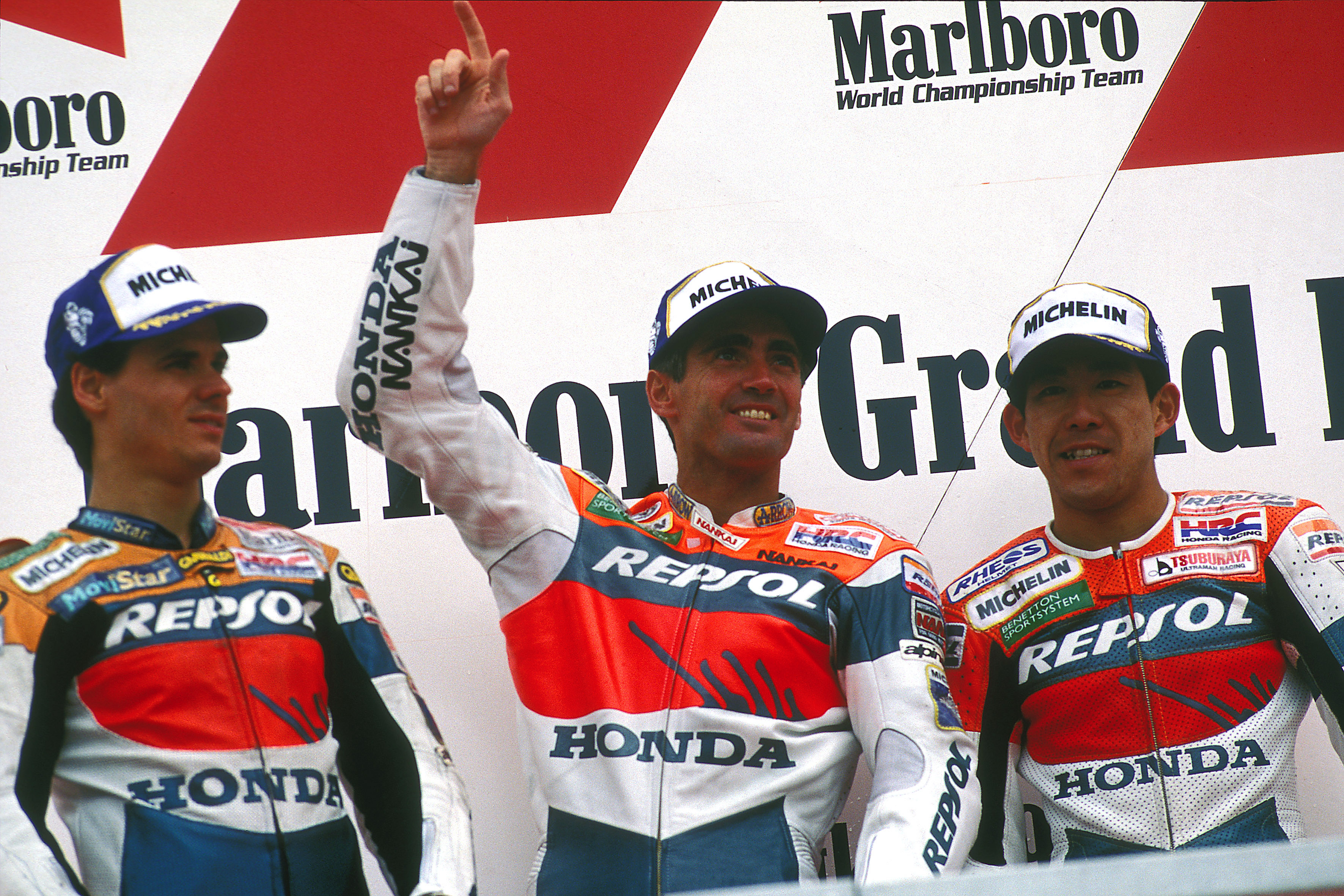
Crivillé on the podium at the Japanese Grand Prix, alongside Repsol Honda compatriots Mick Doohan (center) and Tadayuki Okada (right).

After finishing as runner-up in 1996, some speculated that there was a real chance that Crivillé could win his first 500cc title in 1997.

Crivillé started his season off by taking back-to-back second places, albeit losing out to teammate Mick Doohan once more. At the Malaysia, he finished a distant second behind his teammate. In Japan however, it was a much closer affair. Crivillé was closely following Doohan on the last lap but was not able to make a proper move. At turn 15 (part of the "Casio Triangle" set of corners), Crivillé tried to lunge up the inside of Doohan but backed off at the last moment, finishing 0.431 behind the Australian.

At round three in Spain, Crivillé won his first race of the season. With teammates Doohan and Okada finishing second and third, the podium was an all-Factory Honda podium once again. Crivillé also took the fastest lap, his first - and only one - of the season. At the next three races in Italy, Austria and France, Crivillé finished fourth, fifth and fourth again respectively.

At the seventh round of the season in the Netherlands, Crivillé did not start the race. He crashed heavily during qualifying practice on Friday, losing control of his bike on a chicane, sliding over the tarmac with his arm trapped underneath the bike. He was treated at the side of the track for ten minutes before being taken away on a stretcher. As a result of the crash, an artery was torn and had to be taken to the hospital for surgery to restore his thumb, requiring skin and bone grafts for his hand as well. He suffered tendon and bone damage as well as lesions of the blood vessels in his left wrist. His left thumb was badly injured. Because of the surgery and subsequent recovery, he missed not only the round in Assen, but also the City of Imola, German, Rio de Janeiro and British rounds, all of which his teammate Doohan won. Crivillé confirmed that he would not race until September of that year, with hopes that he could return for his home race in Cataluña, but that there was also a chance that he may never race again.

Crivillé however, returned one round earlier. At the Czech Republic race, he impressed by finishing in fourth position, battling with Nobuatsu Aoki and Norifumi Abe for third place. His good form continued when he took third in his home race in Catalunya, moving up from seventh to third place going into the first corner and battling with teammate Doohan and Carlos Checa for the lead throughout the race. Another distant third place podium followed at the penultimate round in Indonesia, with another all-Factory Honda podium due to the win of Okada and the second place of Doohan.

In Australia, Crivillé took his second and final victory of the season. Doohan started on pole but crashed out of the race, allowing Crivillé to win the race by 2.268 seconds from the second place Takuma Aoki.

Crivillé finished fourth in the championship with 172 points, 168 points behind the champion and teammate Mick Doohan and 25 points behind runner-up Tadayuki Okada.

1998

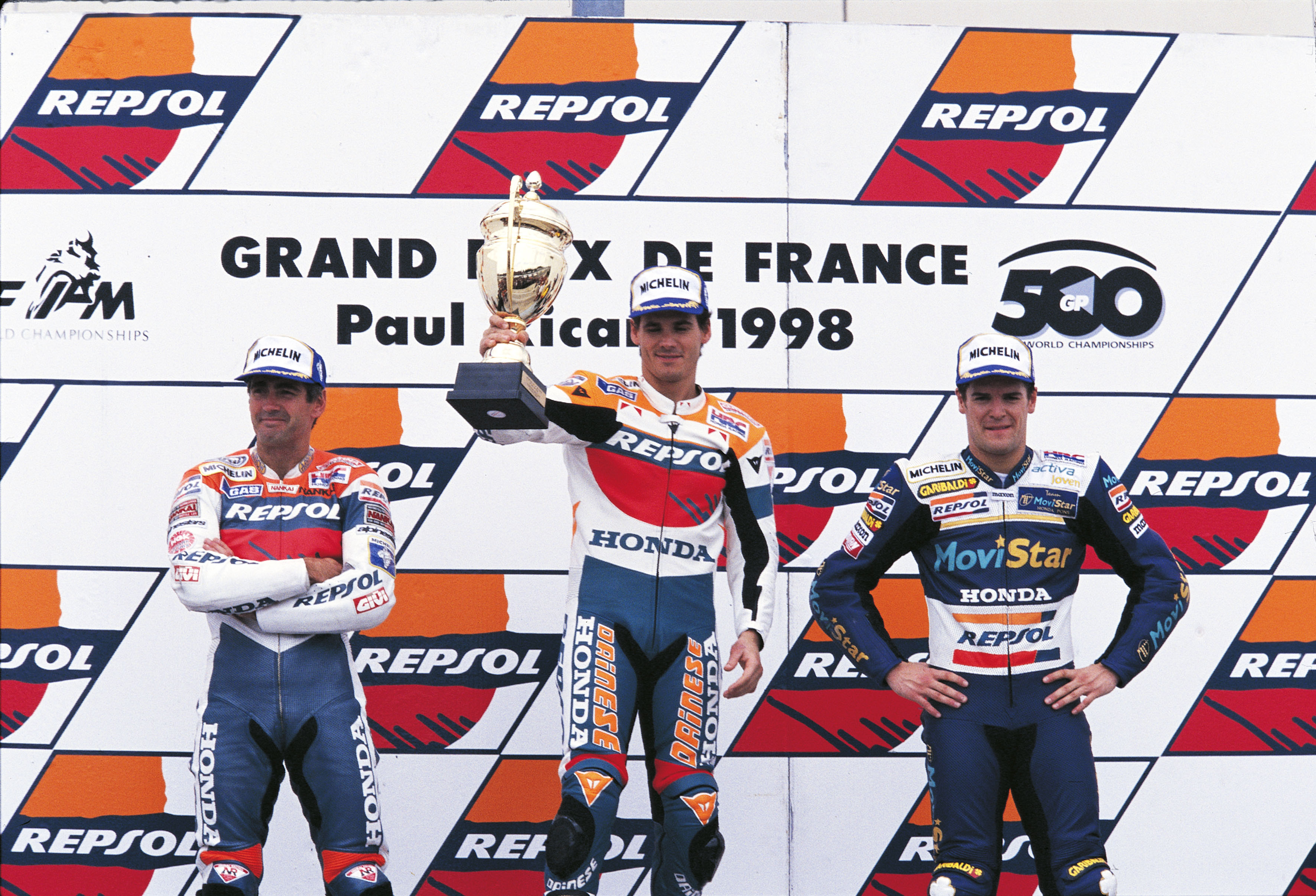
Crivillé on the podium at the French Grand Prix, his second victory of the season.

Despite losing out on a title chance in 1997, Crivillé continued with the Repsol Honda team for 1998.

Initially, Crivillé started off with two fourth-place finishes in Japan and Malaysia. In Spain, Crivillé scored his first win of the season. He battled with Max Biaggi, Carlos Checa and Alex Barros and, in the closing stages, with teammate Mick Doohan as well. After Doohan took the lead and led for about 15 laps, with Biaggi and Crivillé behind him. Crivillé then overtook Biaggi for second and hunted down the Australian, who he eventually passed for the lead in the last remaining laps. Doohan tried to fight back but failed, allowing the Catalan to win by 0.393 seconds. He dedicated this victory to his father, who died during the winter. He also took the fastest lap.

After his first victory of the season in Jerez, Crivillé's good form continued at the Italian GP where he finished third. In France, his second and final win of the year came after Crivillé overtook then-leader Carlos Checa three laps before the end and then held off Doohan and Checa to win by a margin of 0.283 seconds. He took his second fastest lap of the year at this venue as well. At the Madrid, Dutch and British rounds, he finished fifth, sixth and fourth.

In Germany, Crivillé returned on the podium in third, albeit a distant 11.379 seconds behind race winner Doohan. At the next two races in the Czech Republic and the City of Imola, Crivillé finished second twice. In Brno, he missed out on the victory (which went to rookie Max Biaggi) but took the fastest lap, and in Imola Crivillé finished a distant 6.564 second behind teammate Doohan. At round twelve in Catalunya, Crivillé took his first and only pole of the season on Saturday, but crashed out on Sunday on the opening lap, which meant that he retired for the first time this year. A final third place podium arrived at the Australian round but another retirement followed at the final round in Argentina.

Crivillé finished third in the championship with 198 points, 62 points behind the champion and teammate Mick Doohan and 10 points behind runner-up Max Biaggi.

1999

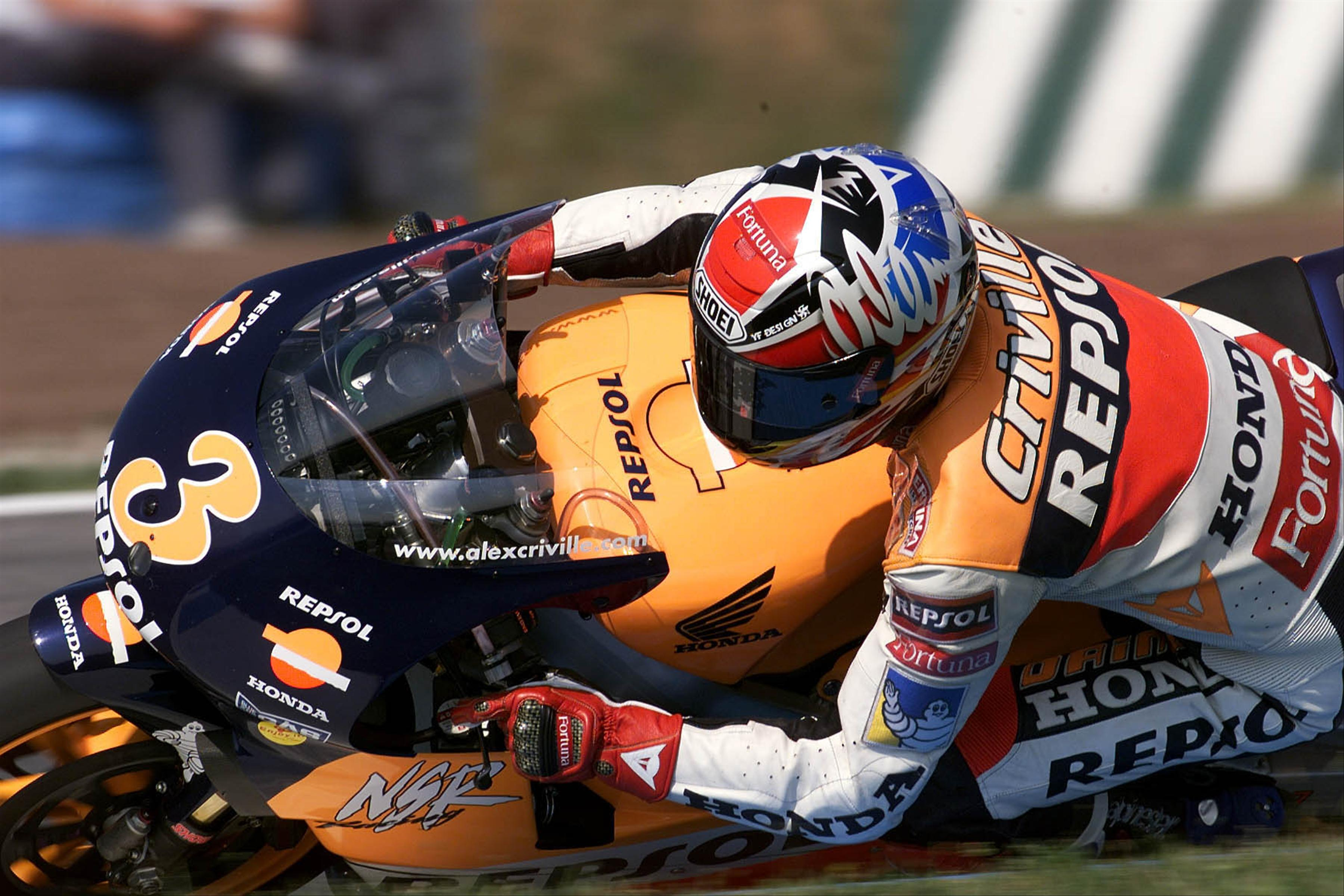
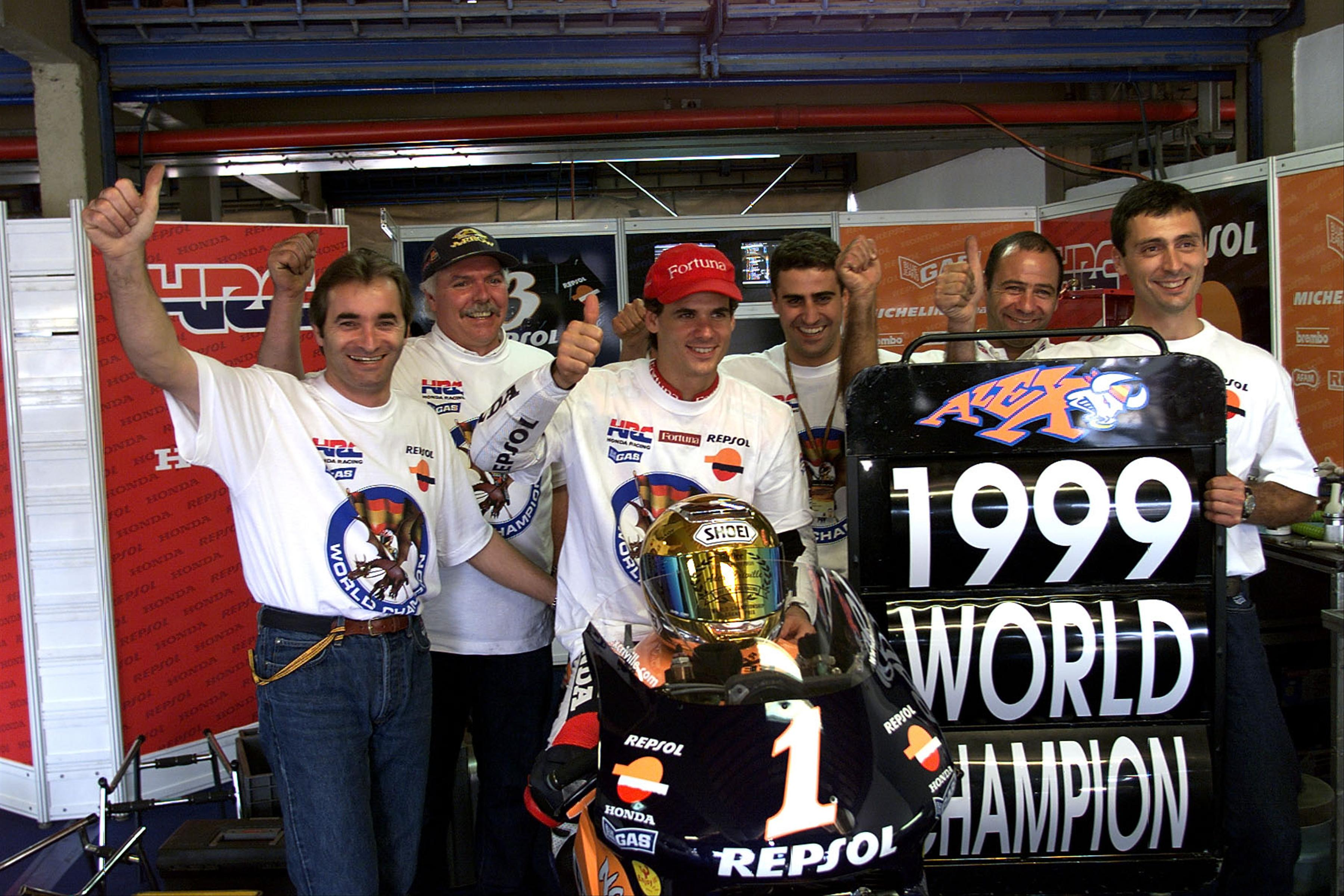
Crivillé riding his Repsol Honda in Catalunya, where he outfoxed teammate Tadayuki Okada for the win, and celebrating his world championship title in Rio de Janeiro with his team.

Few predicted that Crivillé could win the title in 1999 after Doohan took yet another world championship in 1998, but Doohan's career-ending crash opened the door for Crivillé, who now had a real opportunity at the title.

At the opening round in Malaysia, Crivillé immediately took a podium in the form of third place at the new Sepang circuit. In Japan he finished a distant fourth while his teammate Doohan finished second.

When five-time 500cc world champion and teammate Mick Doohan broke his leg in several places, but also his collarbone and wrist when he crashed during a very wet qualifying session at the Spanish Grand Prix, Crivillé immediately took the opportunity and set pole on Saturday. On Sunday, he battled with and held off Max Biaggi to take fastest lap and his first victory of the year by just 0.157 seconds in only his third race of the season.

Crivillé's good form continued in the next three races. In France, he took a commanding win ahead of John Kocinski and Tetsuya Harada, in Italy he held off Biaggi once again to score back-to-back wins and in Catalunya, he closed in on teammate Tadayuki Okada who was leading the race on the last lap, overtook him going into turn 10 (the "La Caixa" corner) and held off Okada (who had a better drive coming out of turn 13 or "New Holland") to claim a popular win by just 0.061 seconds. It was the first time Crivillé had won four races in succession in his career.

At the Dutch GP, Crivillé registered his first retirement of the season, but followed it up with another win in his 100th 500cc start at Great Britain. With teammate Okada starting from pole, Crivillé moved up from the middle of the field up to third as the race progressed. He then overtook second placed Roberts Jr. and went after leader Okada. After a failed overtaking attempt at turn 10 (the "Melbourne Hairpin") and a comeback from Okada on the same corner to retake the lead on the last lap, Crivillé held on and won the race by 0.536 seconds. He took his second and final fastest lap of the year here as well.

Two-second places followed in Germany and the Czech Republic. At the Sachsenring, Crivillé lost out to Kenny Roberts Jr. by just 0.338 seconds and in Brno likewise happened when teammate Okada got the better of him and crossed the line 0.240 seconds ahead of the Catalan. At round eleven in the City of Imola race, Crivillé took his second pole of the season on Saturday, outqualifying Kenny Roberts Jr. in the process. On Sunday, Crivillé stayed ahead of Alex Barros and home hero Max Biaggi to win the race with a 0.265-second margin over Barros. This win extended his lead over Roberts Jr. by 66 points.

After a string of good results, Crivillé had a second retirement of the season at the new Valencian Community round. A few laps before the end, he had an accident which brought him out of contention. In Australia, Crivillé had a crash during qualifying in which he suffered a cracked bone in his hand due to a highside, which launched him off his bike at high speed. He participated in the race on Sunday and finished fifth. In South Africa he finished third, that being his last podium of the season.

Going into the penultimate round in Rio de Janeiro, Crivillé had a 44-point lead over his teammate Okada and needed to finish tenth or higher to secure the title. However, he was still recovering from a broken wrist injury he sustained two races before at Phillip Island and thus started the race from eleventh place. During the race he fought with Anthony Gobert and Garry McCoy and finished in sixth, ahead of Okada, to win the title. He became the first Spaniard, as well as Catalan, to win a 500cc title. With the title already won, Crivillé finished fifth at the last race of the season in Argentina.

Crivillé finished first in the championship with 267 points, 47 points ahead of Kenny Roberts Jr. and 56 points ahead of teammate Tadayuki Okada. He took six wins and clinched his first and only 500cc World Championship title and second overall championship at the penultimate race of the season in Rio, finishing in sixth place.

2000

With Crivillé winning his first-ever 500cc title in 1999, expectations were high that Crivillé would do the same in 2000. However, the new NSR500 bike for 2000 proved to be worse than its predecessor last year, with Crivillé frequently struggling all throughout the season as a result.

A fifth place at the opening round in South Africa made him the best of the Repsol Honda riders, with Sete Gibernau and Tadayuki Okada both out of the race. A crash on the opening lap saw Crivillé retire in Malaysia, with a sixth and fourth place following in the Japanese and Spanish GPs.

At the fifth round of the season in France, Crivillé scored his final win of his career. Despite starting from fifth on the grid on Saturday, Crivillé made a relatively good start and slowly moved up the field, overtaking Carlos Checa and Kenny Roberts Jr. to take the lead. He then battled with and held off the hard charging Norifumi Abe and rookie Valentino Rossi to cross the line 0.321 ahead of the Japanese.

After his win in Le Mans, two consecutive retirements followed in Italy and Catalunya. Crivillé had an accident after eight and ten laps in Mugello and Cataluña, causing him to retire twice. In a wet-dry race in the Netherlands, Crivillé took second behind Alex Barros after both passed Sete Gibernau and Régis Laconi, the Catalan unable to close the gap to Barros as he crossed the line 2.077 ahead of Crivillé.

In Great Britain, Crivillé finished seventh but slid out of contention once more after twelve laps in Germany. More points followed when he finished in seventh and sixth place at the Czech Republic and Portuguese grand Prix. At round thirteen in the Valencian Community, Crivillé took his only fastest lap of the season but crashed after twelve laps, adding another retirement to his tally. Two more points finished followed in Rio de Janeiro, where he finished eleventh, and in the Pacific, where he finished sixth. Crivillé then retired at the last race of the year in Australia, crashing out after nine laps - his sixth retirement of the season.

Crivillé finished ninth in the championship with 122 points, 136 points behind the champion Kenny Roberts Jr. and 87 points behind runner-up Valentino Rossi.

After the season had ended, Crivillé crashed on the second of the three post-season testing days at the Jerez circuit in November 2000. He lost the front when going into turn 6 (the "Dry Sack" corner) at around 100 km/h. His hand was trapped under the bike and he injured his right little finger as a result. After a first diagnosis done at the circuit's medical centre, he was flown to Barcelona to double-check his injury. Test rider Tohru Ukawa had to take over his test duties after his incident, for which he also required surgery.

2001

After Crivillé lost the title to Kenny Roberts Jr., he changed his number from 1 to 28 for 2001, which was his final year with the Repsol Honda team. He signed a new contract with the team, extending it by one year in August 2000. Suzuki also approached him to partner Kenny Roberts Jr. in this year, but the Catalan refused the offer.

Crivillé started his season off with two points finishes in the form of ninth and sixth at the Japanese and South African rounds, still struggling with an underperforming and difficult bike.

His first podium arrived at the Spanish race. Having qualified a lowly twelfth on Saturday due to set-up problems with his bike, he dropped to thirteenth on the opening lap, he fought his way back to eighth place by lap 10, which became seventh when he overtook Biaggi, who made a mistake when running wide on the same lap. On lap 12, he overtook Alex Barros for sixth, and did likewise to Kenny Roberts Jr. at the start/finish straight at the beginning of lap 13, promoting him to fifth place. He then charged after Shinya Nakano, closing in on him with each passing lap. On lap 15, Loris Capirossi went wide and lost third place, promoting Crivillé up fourth and Nakano up to third place. At the beginning of lap 16, Crivillé overtook Nakano in the same fashion as he did with Kenny Roberts Jr. at the start/finish straight, going up the inside of turn 1 (the "Expo '92" corner). He then closed the gap to second place Norifumi Abe and was close in the final laps, but ultimately was unable to overtake him and had to settle for third. After the race, the Catalan cited that "It's great to be on the podium again" and "I had so many problems this weekend, but for Honda and Repsol and everyone this is where we should be. It feels like 1999 again and I'm riding like I know I can. Last year was so bad that everyone said I was finished. This result means a lot."

More points finish followed after Jerez - fifth in France, fourth in Italy and eleventh in Catalunya. Crivillé had his first retirement at the Dutch GP when he crashed after only three laps. He finished seventh in Great Britain.

Crivillé did not start the German grand Prix after two hefty accidents in the same corner at the second qualifying session on Saturday. In the first, he collided with the Honda Pons of Loris Capirossi, who was on a hot lap and had the racing line, smashing into the side of his bike and crashing out. He walked away unharmed despite the incident looking severe. The second time he went off on his own and briefly lost consciousness because of it. He was taken to the trackside hospital and he felt dazed and confused. He also didn't remember the first fall, but after a few minutes rest, he regained his memory. As a result of the incident, the doctors decided to take him into the medical centre in Chemnitz to undergo a scan to check if everything was okay. He ended up with a broken left index finger, as well as numerous cuts on his face and his brow.

After missing out the race at the Sachsenring, Crivillé returned in the Czech Republic in the best way possible. Having qualified only eighth on Saturday, he climbed his way up to second, defending his position from a hard-charging Capirossi on the final lap, to take second place - his best result since he won the 2000 French Grand Prix. After the race, Criville cited that "After Germany, I never imagined I'd be on the podium here, this result is like a win for me," and "I had a good rest during the break and that helped a lot. The team worked well here and I've now shown that I'm not too old to race up front!"

However, after his good result in Brno, two more retirements followed. In Portugal he crashed out on the opening lap and in the Valencian Community race, he did likewise on lap 7. At the final four races of the season - the Pacific, Australian, Malaysian and Rio de Janeiro rounds - Crivillé finished eleventh twice, sixth and seventh.

Crivillé finished eighth in the championship with 120 points, 205 points behind the champion Valentino Rossi and 90 points behind runner-up Max Biaggi.

== Retirement ==
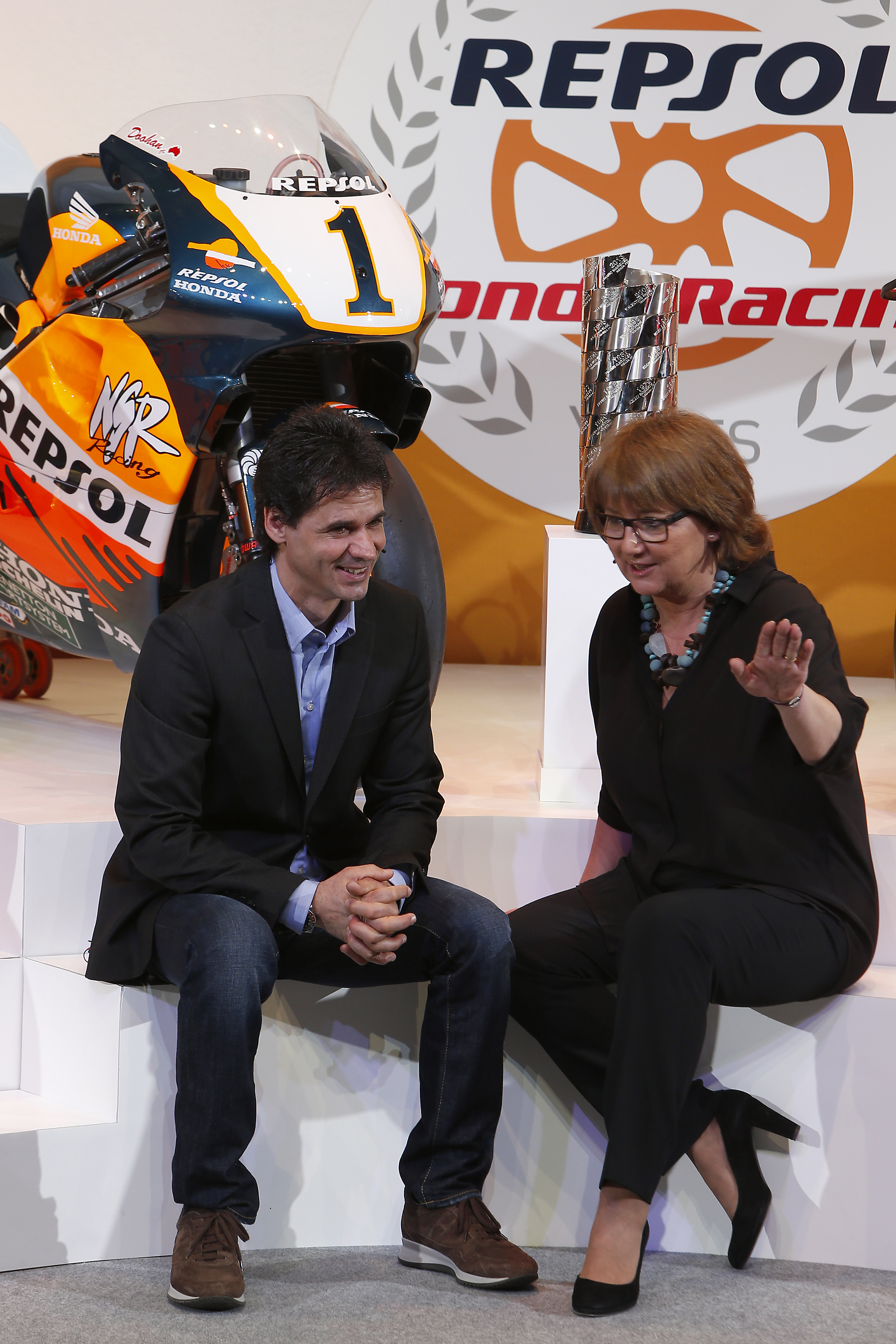
Crivillé being interviewed by the Spanish journalist Olga Viza during the celebration of 20 years of partnership between Repsol and the Factory Honda team in 2014.

At a press conference before the 2001 Portuguese Grand Prix in September, the press asked Crivillé about rumours regarding his future with the Repsol Honda team, to which he replied "I don't know what's going on," and "We are in talks right now but I have options should there not be a suitable offer from Honda.", hinting at possible alternatives if he were to not continue riding for the team.

On November 12, 2001, Crivillé announced that he had parted ways with the Repsol Honda team after ten years with the team and that he was considering his options for the 2002 season. "This week everything will be decided and it will be me and no one else that makes the decision," he said. Originally there were plans to ride a Factory Aprilia four-stroke bike in 2002. However the proposal deal he had hoped for did not appear and as a result, he started talking to Luis d'Antin's Antena3 d'Antin Yamaha team for a chance to ride for the team and partner Norifumi Abe. Crivillé also did not rule out retiring either, starting that "I am not going to close any door, and I could still go to Aprilia or even retire," and that "I alone will decide my future."

However, Crivillé was not able to start in 2002 due to undetermined health problems. He stated in a press conference in late 2001 that "I have been forced to take a break from my sporting career due to physical problems. Since 1999, I have had a condition whereby I temporarily lose consciousness from time to time. It is not serious, but after consulting the best specialists in the field I was advised to stop riding for a while, to take the time to relax and undergo the necessary tests." He stated that he did not intend to retire and that this was simply a necessary break from the sport for medical reasons.

On May 5, 2002, however, the now 32 year old Crivillé held an emotional press conference on the second day of official qualifying for the 2002 Spanish Grand Prix where he announced his retirement from the sport, citing his illness as a reason. He stated that "I would have liked to have carried on, but I have reached the conclusion that I should retire." and that "This is a very emotional day for me and I have decided to retire after thinking for a long time." He also stated that "I am now going to take a year off and after that I would like to return to the world of bike racing, but as to what role I would have I am not yet sure."

After his retirement, Crivillé is still present in the MotoGP paddock and at the Repsol Honda squad along with Mick Doohan at special events of the team, such as Repsol's 20 and 25 years of collaboration with the team in 2014 and 2019.

== Career statistics ==
=== Grand Prix motorcycle racing ===
Points system from 1969 to 1987:

**Position**	1	2	3	4	5	6	7	8	9	10
'Points	15	12	10	8	6	5	4	3	2	1

Points system from 1988 to 1992:

**Position**	1	2	3	4	5	6	7	8	9	10	11	12	13	14	15
**Points**	20	17	15	13	11	10	9	8	7	6	5	4	3	2	1

Points system from 1993 onwards:

**Position**	1	2	3	4	5	6	7	8	9	10	11	12	13	14	15
**Points**	25	20	16	13	11	10	9	8	7	6	5	4	3	2	1

==== Races by year ====
(key) (Races in bold indicate pole position; races in italics indicate fastest lap)

Year	Class	Team	Bike	1	2	3	4	5	6	7	8	9	10	11	12	13	14	15	16	Pos	Pts	Wins
1987	80cc	Derbi	Derbi 80	ESP; 2	GER	NAT	AUT	YUG	NED; Ret	GBR	CZE	RSM	POR; Ret							11th	12	0
1988	80cc	Derbi	Derbi 80	ESP; 3	EXP; 3	NAT; 4	GER; 2		NED; Ret		YUG; 3				CZE; 3					2nd	90	0
1988	125cc	Derbi	Derbi 125	ESP		NAT	GER	AUT	NED	BEL; Ret	YUG	FRA	GBR; 9	SWE; Ret	CZE; 17					31st	7	0
1989	125cc	JJ Cobas	Cobas Rotax 125	JPN	AUS; 1	**ESP**; 1	NAT; Ret	GER; 1	AUT; 3	NED; 2	BEL; Ret	FRA; 2	GBR; 2	**SWE**; 1	**CZE**; 1					**1st**	166	5
1990	250cc	Marlboro Yamaha	TZ250	JPN	USA; Ret	ESP; 7	NAT; Ret	GER; 11	AUT; Ret	YUG; 7	NED; Ret	BEL; Ret	FRA; 8	GBR; 8	SWE; 9	CZE; 7	HUN; 5	AUS; 6		11th	76	0
1991	250cc	JJ Cobas	Cobas Honda 250	JPN; Ret	AUS; Ret	USA; 9	ESP; Ret	ITA; Ret	GER; 7	AUT; 9	EUR; Ret	NED; Ret	FRA; 9	GBR; Ret	RSM; Ret	CZE; 5	VDM; Ret	MAL; 6		13th	51	0
1992	500cc	Campsa Pons Honda	NSR500	JPN; Ret	AUS; 7	MAL; 3	ESP; Ret	ITA; 8	EUR; Ret	GER; 4	NED; 1	HUN; DSQ	FRA; Ret	GBR; Ret	BRA; 6	RSA; 7				8th	59	1
1993	500cc	Marlboro Pons Honda	NSR500	AUS; 6	MAL; 5	JPN; 5	ESP; 3	AUT; Ret	GER; 4	NED; 3	EUR; Ret	RSM; Ret	GBR; Ret	CZE; 8	ITA; 6	USA; 7	FIM; 4			8th	117	0
1994	500cc	HRC Honda	NSR500	AUS; 6	MAL; 8	JPN; 7	ESP; 5	AUT; 3	GER; 4	NED; 3	ITA; Ret	FRA; 3	GBR; 6	CZE; 4	USA; DNS	ARG; 7	EUR; 4			6th	144	0
1995	500cc	Repsol Honda	NSR500	AUS; 3	MAL; 3	JPN; Ret	ESP; 3	GER; 4	ITA; 5	**NED**; 2	FRA; Ret	GBR; 3	CZE; 6	BRA; 6	ARG; 4	EUR; 1				4th	166	1
1996	500cc	Repsol Honda	NSR500	MAL; Ret	INA; 4	**JPN**; 2	ESP; Ret	ITA; 2	**FRA**; 2	**NED**; 2	**GER**; 3	GBR; 2	AUT; 1	CZE; 1	IMO; 2	CAT; 3	BRA; 2	**AUS**; 6		2nd	245	2
1997	500cc	Repsol Honda	NSR500	MAL; 2	JPN; 2	ESP; 1	ITA; 4	AUT; 5	FRA; 4	NED	IMO	GER	BRA	GBR	CZE; 4	CAT; 3	INA; 3	AUS; 1		4th	172	2
1998	500cc	Repsol Honda	NSR500	JPN; 4	MAL; 4	ESP; 1	ITA; 3	FRA; 1	MAD; 5	NED; 6	GBR; 4	GER; 3	CZE; 2	IMO; 2	**CAT**; Ret	AUS; 3	ARG; Ret			3rd	198	2
1999	500cc	Repsol Honda	NSR500	MAL; 3	JPN; 4	**ESP**; 1	FRA; 1	ITA; 1	CAT; 1	NED; Ret	GBR; 1	GER; 2	CZE; 2	**IMO**; 1	VAL; Ret	AUS; 5	RSA; 3	BRA; 6	ARG; 5	**1st**	267	6
2000	500cc	Repsol Honda	NSR500	RSA; 5	MAL; Ret	JPN; 6	ESP; 4	FRA; 1	ITA; Ret	CAT; Ret	NED; 2	GBR; 7	GER; Ret	CZE; 7	POR; 6	VAL; Ret	BRA; 11	PAC; 6	AUS; Ret	9th	122	1
2001	500cc	Repsol Honda	NSR500	JPN; 9	RSA; 6	ESP; 3	FRA; 5	ITA; 4	CAT; 11	NED; Ret	GBR; 7	GER; DNS	CZE; 2	POR; Ret	VAL; Ret	PAC; 11	AUS; 11	MAL; 6	BRA; 7	8th	120	0

== Bibliography ==
- Crivillé, Alex (1 January 2000). Alex Crivillé: Mi vida sobre ruedas (in Spanish). Ediciones Martinez Roca. ISBN 978-8427025813.
- Crivillé, Àlex (March 2010). Una vida sobre ruedas (in Spanish). Barcelona: Plataforma Editorial. ISBN 978-8496981812.
