= 1998 Malaysian motorcycle Grand Prix =

(Malaysia) 1998 Malaysian Grand Prix
Race details
- Race 2 of 14 races in the 1998 Grand Prix motorcycle racing season
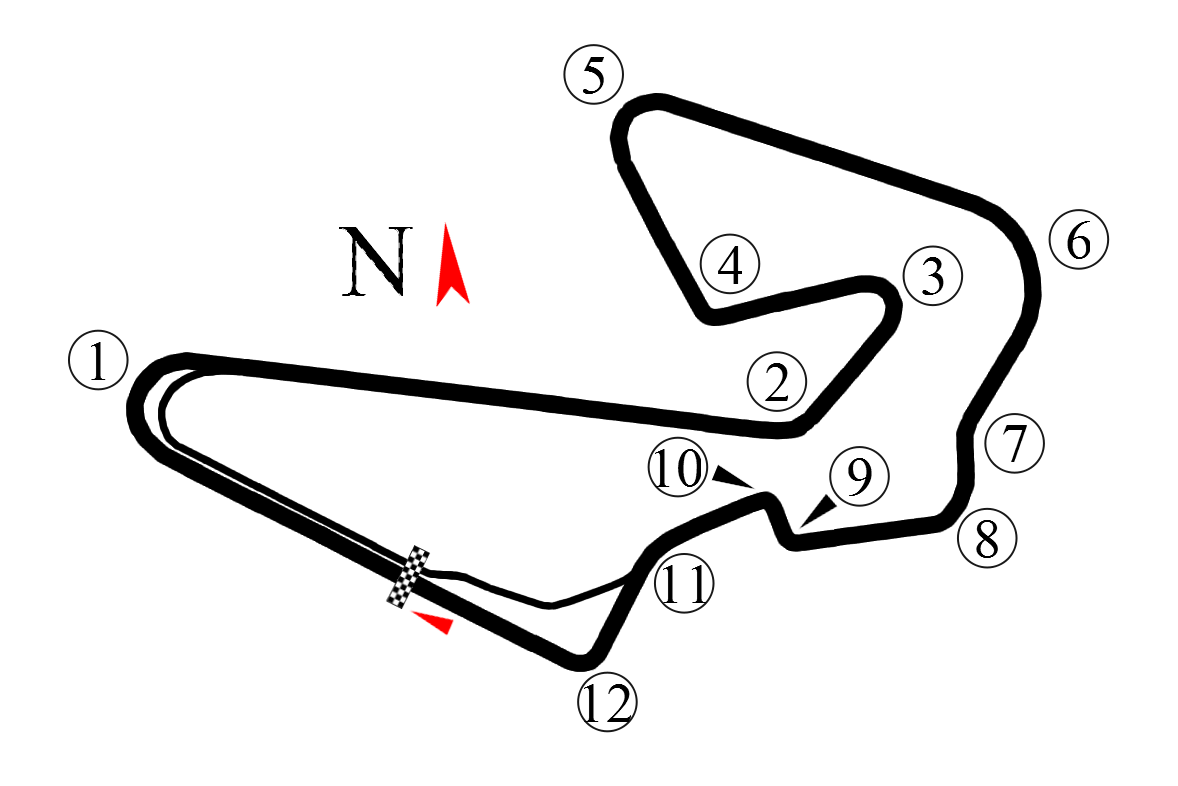
- Date: 19 April 1998
- Official name: Marlboro Malaysian Grand Prix
- Location: Johor Circuit
- Course: Permanent racing facility; 3.860 km (2.398 mi)

500cc
Pole position
Rider	(Australia) Mick Doohan	Honda
Time	1:28.225	
Fastest lap
Rider	(Australia) Mick Doohan	Honda
Time	1:29.636 on lap 3	
Podium
First	(Australia) Mick Doohan	Honda
Second	(Spain) Carlos Checa	Honda
Third	(Italy) Max Biaggi	Honda

250cc
Pole position
Rider	(Germany) Jürgen Fuchs	Aprilia
Time	1:30.395	
Fastest lap
Rider	(Italy) Valentino Rossi	Aprilia
Time	1:30.897 on lap 27	
Podium
First	(Japan) Tetsuya Harada	Aprilia
Second	(Japan) Tohru Ukawa	Honda
Third	(France) Olivier Jacque	Honda

125cc
Pole position
Rider	(Japan) Noboru Ueda	Honda
Time	1:34.516	
Fastest lap
Rider	(Japan) Masao Azuma	Honda
Time	1:34.782 on lap 10	
Podium
First	(Japan) Noboru Ueda	Honda
Second	(Italy) Mirko Giansanti	Honda
Third	(Japan) Tomomi Manako	Honda

The 1998 Malaysian motorcycle Grand Prix was the second round of the 1998 Grand Prix motorcycle racing season. It took place on 19 April 1998 at the Johor Circuit.

== 500 cc classification ==
Pos.	No.	Rider	Team	Manufacturer	Laps	Time/Retired	Grid	Points
1	1	(Australia) Mick Doohan	Repsol Honda	Honda	30	45:15.533	1	25
2	8	(Spain) Carlos Checa	Movistar Honda Pons	Honda	30	+2.634	3	20
3	6	(Italy) Max Biaggi	Marlboro Team Kanemoto	Honda	30	+4.410	2	16
4	4	(Spain) Àlex Crivillé	Repsol Honda	Honda	30	+10.619	17	13
5	19	(United States) John Kocinski	Movistar Honda Pons	Honda	30	+13.079	9	11
6	25	(Japan) Yukio Kagayama	Suzuki Grand Prix Team	Suzuki	30	+19.382	5	10
7	52	(Japan) Norihiko Fujiwara	BP Yamaha Racing Team	Yamaha	30	+41.494	12	9
8	17	(Netherlands) Jurgen van den Goorbergh	Dee Cee Jeans Racing Team	Honda	30	+48.970	18	8
9	28	(Germany) Ralf Waldmann	Marlboro Team Roberts	Modenas KR3	30	+52.131	13	7
10	18	(Australia) Garry McCoy	Shell Advance Racing	Honda	30	+1:00.294	16	6
11	10	(United States) Kenny Roberts Jr.	Team Roberts	Modenas KR3	30	+1:20.245	19	5
12	23	(United States) Matt Wait	FCC TSR	Honda	30	+1:23.599	21	4
13	22	(France) Sébastien Gimbert	Tecmas Honda Elf	Honda	30	+1:34.532	20	3
Ret	14	(Spain) Juan Borja	Shell Advance Racing	Honda	11	Accident	15	
Ret	5	(Japan) Norick Abe	Yamaha Team Rainey	Yamaha	6	Accident	7	
Ret	3	(Japan) Nobuatsu Aoki	Suzuki Grand Prix Team	Suzuki	3	Accident	8	
Ret	57	(Italy) Fabio Carpani	Team Polini Inoxmacel	Honda	3	Retirement	22	
Ret	21	(Japan) Kyoji Nanba	Yamaha Team Rainey	Yamaha	1	Accident	4	
Ret	15	(Spain) Sete Gibernau	Repsol Honda	Honda	1	Accident	14	
Ret	53	(South Africa) Russell Wood	Shell Advance Racing	Honda	1	Accident	23	
Ret	11	(New Zealand) Simon Crafar	Red Bull Yamaha WCM	Yamaha	0	Accident	11	
Ret	2	(Japan) Tadayuki Okada	Repsol Honda	Honda	0	Accident	6	
Ret	9	(Brazil) Alex Barros	Honda Gresini	Honda	0	Retirement	10	
DNS	7	(Italy) Doriano Romboni	MuZ Roc Rennen Sport	MuZ		Did not start		

== 250 cc classification ==
Pos.	No.	Rider	Manufacturer	Laps	Time/Retired	Grid	Points
1	31	(Japan) Tetsuya Harada	Aprilia	28	42:55.302	5	25
2	5	(Japan) Tohru Ukawa	Honda	28	+1.259	7	20
3	19	(France) Olivier Jacque	Honda	28	+12.166	4	16
4	6	(Japan) Haruchika Aoki	Honda	28	+15.887	8	13
5	65	(Italy) Loris Capirossi	Aprilia	28	+18.934	3	11
6	4	(Italy) Stefano Perugini	Honda	28	+19.162	10	10
7	9	(United Kingdom) Jeremy McWilliams	TSR-Honda	28	+21.821	9	9
8	11	(Germany) Jürgen Fuchs	Aprilia	28	+24.109	1	8
9	27	(Argentina) Sebastián Porto	Aprilia	28	+26.216	6	7
10	17	(Spain) José Luis Cardoso	Yamaha	28	+34.541	11	6
11	7	(Japan) Takeshi Tsujimura	Yamaha	28	+40.510	14	5
12	44	(Italy) Roberto Rolfo	TSR-Honda	28	+45.201	13	4
13	12	(Japan) Noriyasu Numata	Suzuki	28	+45.397	19	3
14	24	(United Kingdom) Jason Vincent	TSR-Honda	28	+47.662	17	2
15	18	(Japan) Osamu Miyazaki	Yamaha	28	+1:13.383	16	1
16	41	(Argentina) Federico Gartner	Aprilia	28	+1:26.065	22	
17	56	(Malaysia) Shahrol Yuzy	Honda	28	+1:31.633	23	
Ret	46	(Italy) Valentino Rossi	Aprilia	27	Accident	2	
Ret	20	(France) William Costes	Honda	18	Retirement	20	
Ret	25	(Japan) Yasumasa Hatakeyama	Honda	18	Accident	25	
Ret	37	(Italy) Luca Boscoscuro	TSR-Honda	17	Retirement	15	
Ret	8	(Spain) Luis d'Antin	Yamaha	17	Retirement	18	
Ret	14	(Italy) Davide Bulega	Honda	14	Retirement	24	
Ret	16	(Sweden) Johan Stigefelt	Suzuki	11	Retirement	12	
Ret	21	(Italy) Franco Battaini	Yamaha	2	Accident	21	
OFFICIAL 250cc REPORT

== 125 cc classification ==
Pos.	No.	Rider	Manufacturer	Laps	Time/Retired	Grid	Points
1	2	(Japan) Noboru Ueda	Honda	26	41:34.332	1	25
2	32	(Italy) Mirko Giansanti	Honda	26	+0.277	3	20
3	3	(Japan) Tomomi Manako	Honda	26	+1.902	6	16
4	5	(Japan) Masaki Tokudome	Aprilia	26	+12.991	5	13
5	15	(Italy) Roberto Locatelli	Honda	26	+14.086	2	11
6	4	(Japan) Kazuto Sakata	Aprilia	26	+31.874	4	10
7	9	(France) Frédéric Petit	Honda	26	+36.955	10	9
8	29	(Spain) Ángel Nieto, Jr.	Aprilia	26	+37.508	13	8
9	20	(Japan) Masao Azuma	Honda	26	+39.492	9	7
10	21	(France) Arnaud Vincent	Aprilia	26	+42.748	20	6
11	22	(Germany) Steve Jenkner	Aprilia	26	+44.743	18	5
12	10	(Italy) Lucio Cecchinello	Honda	26	+44.950	11	4
13	8	(Italy) Gianluigi Scalvini	Honda	26	+56.948	7	3
14	39	(Czech Republic) Jaroslav Huleš	Honda	26	+58.446	22	2
15	26	(Italy) Ivan Goi	Aprilia	26	+1:01.914	15	1
16	7	(Spain) Emilio Alzamora	Aprilia	26	+1:02.499	17	
17	62	(Japan) Yoshiaki Katoh	Yamaha	26	+1:03.953	14	
18	18	(Italy) Paolo Tessari	Aprilia	26	+1:20.527	19	
Ret	11	(Spain) José Ramírez	Aprilia	7	Retirement	21	
Ret	16	(Italy) Christian Manna	Yamaha	7	Retirement	24	
Ret	13	(Italy) Marco Melandri	Honda	3	Accident	8	
Ret	17	(Spain) Enrique Maturana	Yamaha	2	Retirement	16	
Ret	23	(Italy) Gino Borsoi	Aprilia	0	Accident	12	
Ret	41	(Japan) Youichi Ui	Yamaha	0	Retirement	26	
DNS	56	(Malaysia) Magilai Meganathan	Honda	0	Did not start	25	
DSQ	19	(Italy) Andrea Ballerini	Honda	8	Disqualified	23	
OFFICIAL 125cc REPORT

== Championship standings after the race (500cc) ==
Below are the standings for the top five riders and constructors after round two has concluded.

Riders' Championship standings

Pos.	Rider	Points
1	(Italy) Max Biaggi	41
2	(Spain) Carlos Checa	28
3	(Spain) Àlex Crivillé	26
4	(Australia) Mick Doohan	25
5	(Japan) Tadayuki Okada	20

Constructors' Championship standings

Pos.	Constructor	Points
1	(Japan) Honda	50
2	(Japan) Yamaha	25
3	(Japan) Suzuki	20
4	(Malaysia) Modenas KR3	12
5	(Germany) MuZ	4

- Note: Only the top five positions are included for both sets of standings.

Previous race: 1998 Japanese Grand Prix	FIM Grand Prix World Championship; 1998 season	Next race: 1998 Spanish Grand Prix
Previous race: 1997 Malaysian Grand Prix	Malaysian Grand Prix	Next race: 1999 Malaysian Grand Prix
