= 1999 French motorcycle Grand Prix =

Fourth round of the 1999 Grand Prix motorcycle racing season

(France) 1999 French Grand Prix
Race details
- Race 4 of 16 races in the 1999 Grand Prix motorcycle racing season
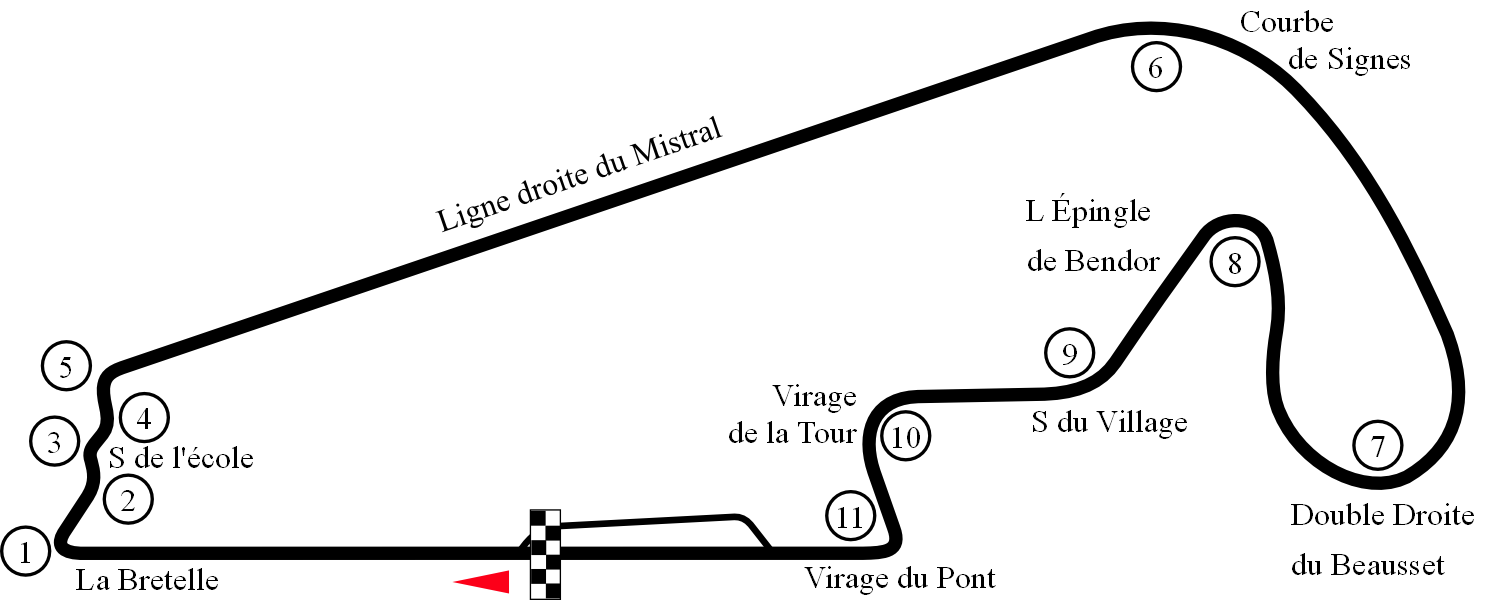
- Date: 23 May 1999
- Official name: Grand Prix de France Moto
- Location: Circuit Paul Ricard
- Course: Permanent racing facility; 3.800 km (2.361 mi)

500cc
Pole position
- Rider: (Italy) Max Biaggi
- Time: 1:20.969
Fastest lap
- Rider: (United States) Kenny Roberts Jr.
- Time: 1:21.487 on lap 3
Podium
- First: (Spain) Àlex Crivillé
- Second: (United States) John Kocinski
- Third: (Japan) Tetsuya Harada

250cc
Pole position
- Rider: (Italy) Valentino Rossi
- Time: 1:23.366
Fastest lap
- Rider: (Italy) Valentino Rossi
- Time: 1:23.635 on lap 12
Podium
- First: (Japan) Tohru Ukawa
- Second: (Japan) Shinya Nakano
- Third: (Italy) Stefano Perugini

125cc
Pole position
- Rider: (Italy) Lucio Cecchinello
- Time: 1:28.864
Fastest lap
- Rider: (Italy) Gianluigi Scalvini
- Time: 1:28.891 on lap 12
Podium
- First: (Italy) Roberto Locatelli
- Second: (France) Arnaud Vincent
- Third: (Spain) Emilio Alzamora

The 1999 French motorcycle Grand Prix was the fourth round of the 1999 Grand Prix motorcycle racing season. It took place on 23 May 1999 at Le Castellet.

== 500 cc classification ==
Pos.	No.	Rider	Team	Manufacturer	Laps	Time/Retired	Grid	Points
1	3	(Spain) Àlex Crivillé	Repsol Honda Team	Honda	31	42:35.648	5	25
2	19	(United States) John Kocinski	Kanemoto Honda	Honda	31	+11.398	3	20
3	31	(Japan) Tetsuya Harada	Aprilia Grand Prix Racing	Aprilia	31	+13.657	7	16
4	15	(Spain) Sete Gibernau	Repsol Honda Team	Honda	31	+14.370	14	13
5	4	(Spain) Carlos Checa	Marlboro Yamaha Team	Yamaha	31	+14.409	4	11
6	6	(Japan) Norick Abe	Antena 3 Yamaha d'Antin	Yamaha	31	+16.639	10	10
7	14	(Spain) Juan Borja	Movistar Honda Pons	Honda	31	+21.224	15	9
8	55	(France) Régis Laconi	Red Bull Yamaha WCM	Yamaha	31	+21.245	13	8
9	8	(Japan) Tadayuki Okada	Repsol Honda Team	Honda	31	+26.063	8	7
10	5	(Brazil) Alex Barros	Movistar Honda Pons	Honda	31	+27.625	12	6
11	11	(New Zealand) Simon Crafar	Red Bull Yamaha WCM	Yamaha	31	+1:02.754	17	5
12	22	(France) Sébastien Gimbert	Tecmas Honda Elf	Honda	31	+1:12.210	18	4
13	26	(Japan) Haruchika Aoki	FCC TSR	TSR-Honda	31	+1:15.698	16	3
14	18	(Germany) Markus Ober	Dee Cee Jeans Racing Team	Honda	30	+1 lap	21	2
Ret	10	(United States) Kenny Roberts Jr.	Suzuki Grand Prix Team	Suzuki	24	Accident	2	
Ret	17	(Netherlands) Jurgen van den Goorbergh	Team Biland GP1	MuZ Weber	7	Retirement	9	
Ret	12	(France) Jean-Michel Bayle	Proton KR Modenas	Modenas KR3	5	Retirement	11	
Ret	7	(Italy) Luca Cadalora	Team Biland GP1	MuZ Weber	4	Retirement	6	
Ret	2	(Italy) Max Biaggi	Marlboro Yamaha Team	Yamaha	2	Accident	1	
Ret	21	(United Kingdom) Michael Rutter	Millar Honda	Honda	0	Accident	20	
Ret	25	(Spain) José Luis Cardoso	Team Maxon TSR	TSR-Honda	0	Accident	19	
DNS	16	(Japan) Yukio Kagayama	Suzuki Grand Prix Team	Suzuki		Did not start		
DNS	20	(United States) Mike Hale	Proton KR Modenas	Modenas KR3		Did not start		
DNQ	68	(Australia) Mark Willis	Buckley Systems BSL Racing	BSL		Did not qualify		

== 250 cc classification ==
Pos.	No.	Rider	Manufacturer	Laps	Time/Retired	Grid	Points
1	4	(Japan) Tohru Ukawa	Honda	29	40:50.340	4	25
2	56	(Japan) Shinya Nakano	Yamaha	29	+10.940	5	20
3	7	(Italy) Stefano Perugini	Honda	29	+20.696	8	16
4	6	(Germany) Ralf Waldmann	Aprilia	29	+21.219	6	13
5	24	(United Kingdom) Jason Vincent	Honda	29	+21.421	12	11
6	21	(Italy) Franco Battaini	Aprilia	29	+26.021 (Note: Franco Battaini received a 5-second penalty for overtaking under yellow flags.)	2	10
7	12	(Argentina) Sebastián Porto	Yamaha	29	+29.172	13	9
8	66	(Germany) Alex Hofmann	TSR-Honda	29	+35.011	14	8
9	14	(Australia) Anthony West	TSR-Honda	29	+35.916	19	7
10	31	(Japan) Toshihiko Honma	Yamaha	29	+38.122	10	6
11	9	(United Kingdom) Jeremy McWilliams	Aprilia	29	+43.060	9	5
12	10	(Spain) Fonsi Nieto	Yamaha	29	+52.963	22	4
13	36	(Japan) Masaki Tokudome	TSR-Honda	29	+52.970	21	3
14	37	(Italy) Luca Boscoscuro	TSR-Honda	29	+53.198	15	2
15	34	(Italy) Marcellino Lucchi	Aprilia	29	+56.805	11	1
16	68	(France) Vincent Philippe	Honda	29	+1:24.349	20	
17	11	(Japan) Tomomi Manako	Yamaha	29	+1:29.118	23	
18	58	(Argentina) Matías Ríos	Aprilia	28	+1 lap	26	
19	22	(Spain) Lucas Oliver Bultó	Yamaha	28	+1 lap	28	
20	27	(Netherlands) Rob Filart	Honda	28	+1 lap	24	
Ret	46	(Italy) Valentino Rossi	Aprilia	28	Retirement	1	
Ret	15	(Spain) David García	Yamaha	24	Retirement	17	
Ret	23	(France) Julien Allemand	TSR-Honda	22	Accident	16	
Ret	1	(Italy) Loris Capirossi	Honda	21	Accident	3	
Ret	44	(Italy) Roberto Rolfo	Aprilia	15	Retirement	7	
Ret	41	(Netherlands) Jarno Janssen	TSR-Honda	9	Accident	18	
Ret	16	(Sweden) Johan Stigefelt	Yamaha	1	Accident	25	
Ret	93	(France) Hervé Mora	Aprilia	1	Accident	29	
Ret	65	(France) Julien da Costa	Honda	1	Retirement	27	
DNQ	67	(France) Thomas Metro	Honda		Did not qualify		

== 125 cc classification ==
Pos.	No.	Rider	Manufacturer	Laps	Time/Retired	Grid	Points
1	15	(Italy) Roberto Locatelli	Aprilia	27	40:23.904	3	25
2	21	(France) Arnaud Vincent	Aprilia	27	+6.124	6	20
3	7	(Spain) Emilio Alzamora	Honda	27	+6.401	5	16
4	4	(Japan) Masao Azuma	Honda	27	+6.567	2	13
5	6	(Japan) Noboru Ueda	Honda	27	+7.015	11	11
6	13	(Italy) Marco Melandri	Honda	27	+7.090	8	10
7	8	(Italy) Gianluigi Scalvini	Aprilia	27	+9.163	4	9
8	17	(Germany) Steve Jenkner	Aprilia	27	+14.240	14	8
9	1	(Japan) Kazuto Sakata	Honda	27	+14.996	17	7
10	16	(Italy) Simone Sanna	Honda	27	+15.487	7	6
11	12	(France) Randy de Puniet	Aprilia	27	+15.490	20	5
12	29	(Spain) Ángel Nieto, Jr.	Honda	27	+15.865	18	4
13	32	(Italy) Mirko Giansanti	Aprilia	27	+19.043	12	3
14	10	(Spain) Jerónimo Vidal	Aprilia	27	+34.498	10	2
15	9	(France) Frédéric Petit	Aprilia	27	+36.391	19	1
16	23	(Italy) Gino Borsoi	Aprilia	27	+39.141	16	
17	20	(Germany) Bernhard Absmeier	Aprilia	27	+1:00.715	24	
18	22	(Spain) Pablo Nieto	Derbi	27	+1:00.814	26	
19	59	(France) Grégory Lefort	Aprilia	27	+1:19.170	25	
20	58	(France) Éric Dubray	Honda	26	+1 lap	27	
21	60	(France) Hervé Louiset	Honda	26	+1 lap	28	
22	52	(France) Mike Lougassi	Honda	25	+2 laps	29	
Ret	44	(Italy) Alessandro Brannetti	Aprilia	19	Accident	15	
Ret	18	(Germany) Reinhard Stolz	Honda	5	Accident	23	
Ret	11	(Italy) Max Sabbatani	Honda	5	Accident	21	
Ret	5	(Italy) Lucio Cecchinello	Honda	2	Accident	1	
Ret	54	(San Marino) Manuel Poggiali	Aprilia	1	Accident	13	
Ret	26	(Italy) Ivan Goi	Honda	0	Accident	22	
Ret	41	(Japan) Youichi Ui	Derbi	0	Accident	9	
DNS	61	(France) Jimmy Petit	Honda		Did not start		

== Championship standings after the race (500cc) ==
Below are the standings for the top five riders and constructors after round four has concluded.

Riders' Championship standings

Pos.	Rider	Points
1	(Spain) Àlex Crivillé	79
2	(United States) Kenny Roberts Jr.	53
3	(Spain) Carlos Checa	47
4	(Spain) Sete Gibernau	46
5	(Japan) Norifumi Abe	37

Constructors' Championship standings

Pos.	Constructor	Points
1	(Japan) Honda	86
2	(Japan) Yamaha	67
3	(Japan) Suzuki	53
4	(Italy) Aprilia	19
5	(Germany) MuZ Weber	11

- Note: Only the top five positions are included for both sets of standings.

== Notes ==
Previous race: 1999 Spanish Grand Prix	FIM Grand Prix World Championship; 1999 season	Next race: 1999 Italian Grand Prix
Previous race: 1998 French Grand Prix	French Grand Prix	Next race: 2000 French Grand Prix
