= 1995 Dutch TT =

(Netherlands) 1995 Dutch Grand Prix
Race details
- Race 7 of 13 races in the 1995 Grand Prix motorcycle racing season
- Date: 24 June 1995
- Official name: Lucky Strike Dutch Grand Prix
- Location: TT Circuit Assen
- Course: Permanent racing facility; 6.049 km (3.759 mi)

MotoGP
Pole position
- Rider: (Spain) Àlex Crivillé
- Time: 2:03.151
Fastest lap
- Rider: (Spain) Àlex Crivillé
- Time: 2:03.475
Podium
- First: (Australia) Mick Doohan
- Second: (Spain) Àlex Crivillé
- Third: (Spain) Alberto Puig

250cc
Pole position
- Rider: (Italy) Max Biaggi
- Time: 2:05.180
Fastest lap
- Rider: (Italy) Max Biaggi
- Time: 2:06.078
Podium
- First: (Italy) Max Biaggi
- Second: (Germany) Ralf Waldmann
- Third: (Japan) Tadayuki Okada

125cc
Pole position
- Rider: (Japan) Hideyuki Nakajo
- Time: 2:15.237
Fastest lap
- Rider: (Japan) Hideyuki Nakajo
- Time: 2:15.629
Podium
- First: (Germany) Dirk Raudies
- Second: (Germany) Peter Öttl
- Third: (Japan) Akira Saito

The 1995 Dutch TT was the seventh round of the 1995 Grand Prix motorcycle racing season. It took place on 24 June 1995 at the TT Circuit Assen located in Assen, Netherlands.

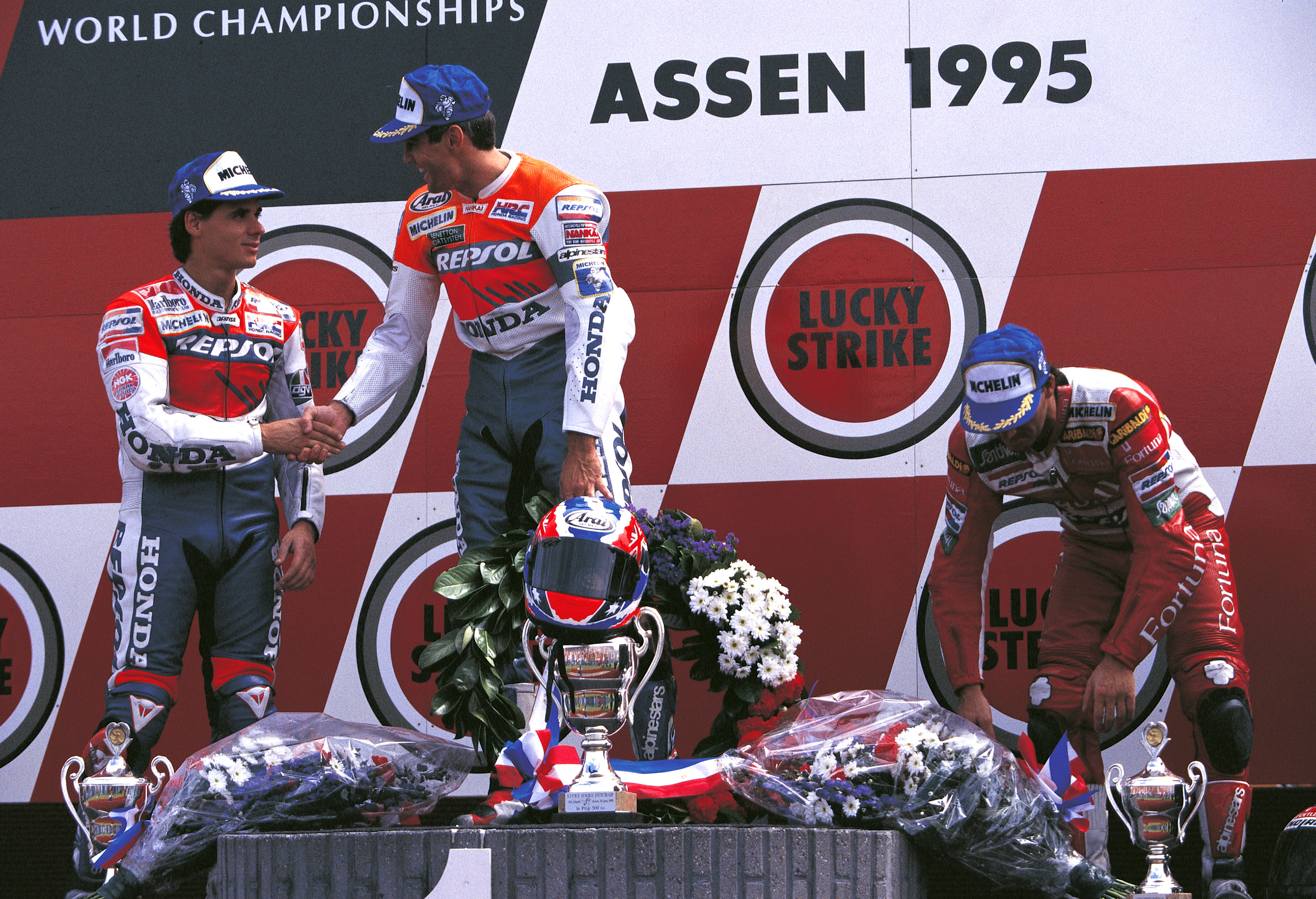
Mick Doohan greets Àlex Crivillé, with Alberto Puig picking up his flowers. Doohan won the race, with Crivillé and Puig finishing second and third in the 500cc race.

== 500 cc classification ==
Pos.	Rider	Team	Manufacturer	Time/Retired	Points
1	(Australia) Mick Doohan	Repsol YPF Honda Team	Honda	41:27.422	25
2	(Spain) Àlex Crivillé	Repsol YPF Honda Team	Honda	+0.114	20
3	(Spain) Alberto Puig	Fortuna Honda Pons	Honda	+0.596	16
4	(Italy) Loris Capirossi	Marlboro Team Pileri	Honda	+5.618	13
5	(Brazil) Alex Barros	Kanemoto Honda	Honda	+12.455	11
6	(Japan) Norifumi Abe	Marlboro Team Roberts	Yamaha	+15.300	10
7	(Italy) Luca Cadalora	Marlboro Team Roberts	Yamaha	+30.740	9
8	(Japan) Shinichi Itoh	Repsol YPF Honda Team	Honda	+38.470	8
9	(Italy) Loris Reggiani	Aprilia Racing Team	Aprilia	+52.644	7
10	(Spain) Juan Borja	Team ROC NRJ	ROC Yamaha	+52.655	6
11	(France) Bernard Garcia	Team ROC NRJ	ROC Yamaha	+54.512	5
12	(United States) Scott Russell	Lucky Strike Suzuki	Suzuki	+59.550	4
13	(United Kingdom) Neil Hodgson	World Championship Motorsports	ROC Yamaha	+1:17.812	3
14	(United Kingdom) James Haydon	Harris Grand Prix	Harris Yamaha	+1:18.396	2
15	(Switzerland) Adrien Bosshard	Thommen Elf Racing	ROC Yamaha	+1:22.784	1
16	(United Kingdom) Eugene McManus	Padgett's Racing Team	Harris Yamaha	+1:31.811	
17	(Italy) Cristiano Migliorati	Harris Grand Prix	Harris Yamaha	+1:51.854	
18	(United Kingdom) Jeremy McWilliams	Millar Racing	Yamaha	+1 Lap	
19	(New Zealand) Andrew Stroud	Team Max	ROC Yamaha	+1 Lap	
20	(Switzerland) Bernard Haenggeli	Haenggeli Racing	ROC Yamaha	+1 Lap	
21	(Italy) Lucio Pedercini	Team Pedercini	ROC Yamaha	+1 Lap	
Ret	(United Kingdom) Sean Emmett	Harris Grand Prix	Harris Yamaha	Retirement	
Ret	(United States) Jim Filice	Padgett's Racing Team	Harris Yamaha	Retirement	
Ret	(France) Bruno Bonhuil	MTD	ROC Yamaha	Retirement	
Ret	(Netherlands) Cees Doorakkers	Phi Racing Team	Harris Yamaha	Retirement	
Ret	(France) Frederic Protat	FP Racing	ROC Yamaha	Retirement	
Ret	(France) Jean Pierre Jeandat	JPJ Paton	Paton	Retirement	
Ret	(United States) Scott Gray	Starsport	Harris Yamaha	Retirement	
DNS	(Australia) Daryl Beattie	Lucky Strike Suzuki	Suzuki	Did not start	
DNS	(France) Marc Garcia	DR Team Shark	ROC Yamaha	Did not start	

== 250 cc classification ==
Pos	Rider	Manufacturer	Time/Retired	Points
1	(Italy) Max Biaggi	Aprilia	38:24.532	25
2	(Germany) Ralf Waldmann	Honda	+4.622	20
3	(Japan) Tadayuki Okada	Honda	+4.896	16
4	(France) Jean Philippe Ruggia	Honda	+17.434	13
5	(United States) Kenny Roberts Jr	Yamaha	+27.654	11
6	(Netherlands) Jurgen vd Goorbergh	Honda	+28.495	10
7	(Japan) Nobuatsu Aoki	Honda	+40.310	9
8	(Italy) Alessandro Gramigni	Honda	+50.775	8
9	(Spain) Luis d'Antin	Honda	+50.893	7
10	(Germany) Jürgen Fuchs	Honda	+50.899	6
11	(Spain) Carlos Checa	Honda	+52.900	5
12	(United Kingdom) Niall Mackenzie	Aprilia	+1:00.732	4
13	(Germany) Adolf Stadler	Aprilia	+1:08.072	3
14	(Netherlands) Patrick vd Goorbergh	Aprilia	+1:11.820	2
15	(Spain) Gregorio Lavilla	Honda	+1:14.067	1
16	(Germany) Bernd Kassner	Aprilia	+1:48.256	
17	(Spain) Pere Riba	Aprilia	+1:50.679	
18	(Netherlands) Maurice Bolwerk	Honda	+2:20.033	
19	(Spain) Miguel Angel Castilla	Yamaha	+2:42.590	
20	(Netherlands) Rudie Markink	Yamaha	+1 Lap	
21	(Netherlands) Frank van Zutphen	Aprilia	+1 Lap	
22	(Netherlands) Rudy Mulder	Yamaha	+1 Lap	
Ret	(Spain) Luis Maurel	Honda	Retirement	
Ret	(Japan) Sadanori Hikita	Honda	Retirement	
Ret	(Switzerland) Eskil Suter	Aprilia	Retirement	
Ret	(France) Jean-Michel Bayle	Aprilia	Retirement	
Ret	(Netherlands) Wilco Zeelenberg	Honda	Retirement	
Ret	(Switzerland) Olivier Petrucciani	Aprilia	Retirement	
Ret	(France) Regis Laconi	Honda	Retirement	
Ret	(France) Olivier Jacque	Honda	Retirement	
Ret	(Italy) Roberto Locatelli	Aprilia	Retirement	
Ret	(Spain) José Luis Cardoso	Aprilia	Retirement	
Ret	(Japan) Takeshi Tsujimura	Honda	Retirement	
Ret	(Japan) Tetsuya Harada	Yamaha	Retirement	

== 125 cc classification ==
Pos	Rider	Manufacturer	Time/Retired	Points
1	(Germany) Dirk Raudies	Honda	38:50.272	25
2	(Germany) Peter Öttl	Aprilia	+4.878	20
3	(Japan) Akira Saito	Honda	+5.010	16
4	(Japan) Kazuto Sakata	Aprilia	+5.398	13
5	(Japan) Haruchika Aoki	Honda	+5.688	11
6	(Spain) Herri Torrontegui	Honda	+6.604	10
7	(Italy) Stefano Perugini	Aprilia	+6.618	9
8	(Japan) Hideyuki Nakajo	Honda	+7.115	8
9	(Japan) Tomomi Manako	Honda	+8.098	7
10	(Italy) Gianluigi Scalvini	Aprilia	+27.376	6
11	(Japan) Tomoko Igata	Honda	+29.970	5
12	(Japan) Yoshiaki Katoh	Yamaha	+30.239	4
13	(Germany) Manfred Geissler	Aprilia	+39.372	3
14	(Italy) Luigi Ancona	Honda	+39.441	2
15	(Spain) Josep Sarda	Honda	+42.818	1
16	(Japan) Hiroyuki Kikuchi	Honda	+50.163	
17	(Italy) Massimo d'Agnano	Aprilia	+1:02.541	
18	(Italy) Gabriele Debbia	Yamaha	+1:02.846	
19	(Germany) Stefan Prein	Yamaha	+1:13.064	
20	(Netherlands) Bas den Breejen	Honda	+1:28.254	
21	(Netherlands) Marcel Nooren	Honda	+2:02.249	
22	(Netherlands) Rob Filart	Honda	+1 Lap	
23	(Netherlands) Peter Den Heyer	Yamaha	+1 Lap	
Ret	(Japan) Takehiro Yamamoto	Honda	Retirement	
Ret	(Japan) Yoshiyuki Sugai	Honda	Retirement	
Ret	(Spain) Emilio Alzamora	Honda	Retirement	
Ret	(Germany) Stefan Kurfiss	Honda	Retirement	
Ret	(Germany) Oliver Koch	Aprilia	Retirement	
Ret	(Japan) Ken Miyasaka	Honda	Retirement	
Ret	(Japan) Masaki Tokudome	Aprilia	Retirement	
Ret	(Italy) Andrea Ballerini	Aprilia	Retirement	
Ret	(Japan) Noboru Ueda	Honda	Retirement	
Ret	(Spain) Jorge Martinez	Yamaha	Retirement	

Previous race: 1995 Italian Grand Prix	FIM Grand Prix World Championship; 1995 season	Next race: 1995 French Grand Prix
Previous race: 1994 Dutch TT	Dutch TT	Next race: 1996 Dutch TT
