= Malaysian motorcycle Grand Prix =

Motorcycle race held in Malaysia

Malaysian Grand Prix

Grand Prix motorcycle racing
- Venue: Sepang International Circuit (1999–2019, 2022–present); Johor Circuit (1998); Shah Alam Circuit (1991–1997)
- First race: 1991
- Most wins (rider): Valentino Rossi (7)
- Most wins (manufacturer): Honda (34)

The Malaysian motorcycle Grand Prix is a motorcycling event that is part of the FIM Grand Prix motorcycle racing season. The event is due to take place at the Sepang International Circuit until at least 2026.

== History ==
The first Malaysian Grand Prix was held in 1991 at the Shah Alam Circuit as the final race of the season. Because of the long trip and high cost, many riders chose to not participate in this event. The 500cc race was won by John Kocinski. The event was notorious due to the tropical temperatures and a high degree of humidity, something which plagued the riders for four consecutive years – from 1992 to 1995 respectively.

In 1998, the race was moved from Shah Alam to the Johor Circuit. The reason for the change was because of the 1997 Asian financial crisis that hit Malaysia at this time. While the rich Sultan of Selangor protected the grand prix for years, the local government was no longer able to host the race at the venue. The circuit of Johor Bahru, close to the country of Singapore, was chosen and as a result, the circuit was overhauled: it was modernised and a new layer of asphalt was put on it. While there were pebbles on the track that kicked up and were a nuisance to the riders, the most shocking thing that happened during the weekend was when Lucio Cecchinello drove over the tail of a passing Cobra, which then looked up before getting hit at high speed by the leg of Gino Borsoi.

In 1999 the Sepang International Circuit, designed by Hermann Tilke, had finished construction. The circuit was not only more modern and purpose-built compared to Johor, it also lay close to Kuala Lumpur International Airport. As a result, the race for that season was moved to Sepang along with Formula One, who held its first race at the country in the same year. Since 1999, the Sepang circuit has hosted the Malaysian GP every year until 2020.

In 2006, the distance between the grid positions was increased following the 2006 Catalan motorcycle Grand Prix where multiple riders crashed on the first corner. On Saturday afternoon, the circuit was hit by a hefty thunderstorm: a lot of rain fell and as a result, the qualifying practice of the MotoGP and second practice of the 250cc classes were cancelled. This caused a problem because there was no official starting times. The problem was solved by combining the three best times set by all riders on Friday practice.

In 2010, Valentino Rossi won his first race in Malaysia since his accident at the Italian round earlier that year, which saw him break his leg. In 2011, Marco Simoncelli died on the first lap of the race after a horror accident where two riders hit him in the head and lower body. The race was abandoned shortly after.

In 2020, the Malaysian round was scrapped due to the COVID-19 pandemic.

In 2026, the Malaysian round contract was extended until 2031.

== Official names and sponsors ==
- 1991: Lucky Strike Malaysia Grand Prix
- 1992: Malaysia Motorcycle Grand Prix (no official sponsor)
- 1993: Malaysia Grand Prix (no official sponsor)
- 1994, 2001: Malaysian Grand Prix (no official sponsor)
- 1995–1996: Marlboro Grand Prix of Malaysia
- 1997–1999: Marlboro Malaysian Grand Prix
- 2000, 2012: Malaysian Motorcycle Grand Prix (no official sponsor)
- 2002: Gauloises Malaysian Motorcycle Grand Prix
- 2003–2006: Marlboro Malaysian Motorcycle Grand Prix
- 2007–2008: Polini Malaysian Motorcycle Grand Prix
- 2009–2011, 2013–2014: Shell Advance Malaysian Motorcycle Grand Prix
- 2015–2019: Shell Malaysia Motorcycle Grand Prix
- 2022–present: Petronas Grand Prix of Malaysia

== Formerly used circuits ==
The Shah Alam circuit, used from 1991 to 1997.

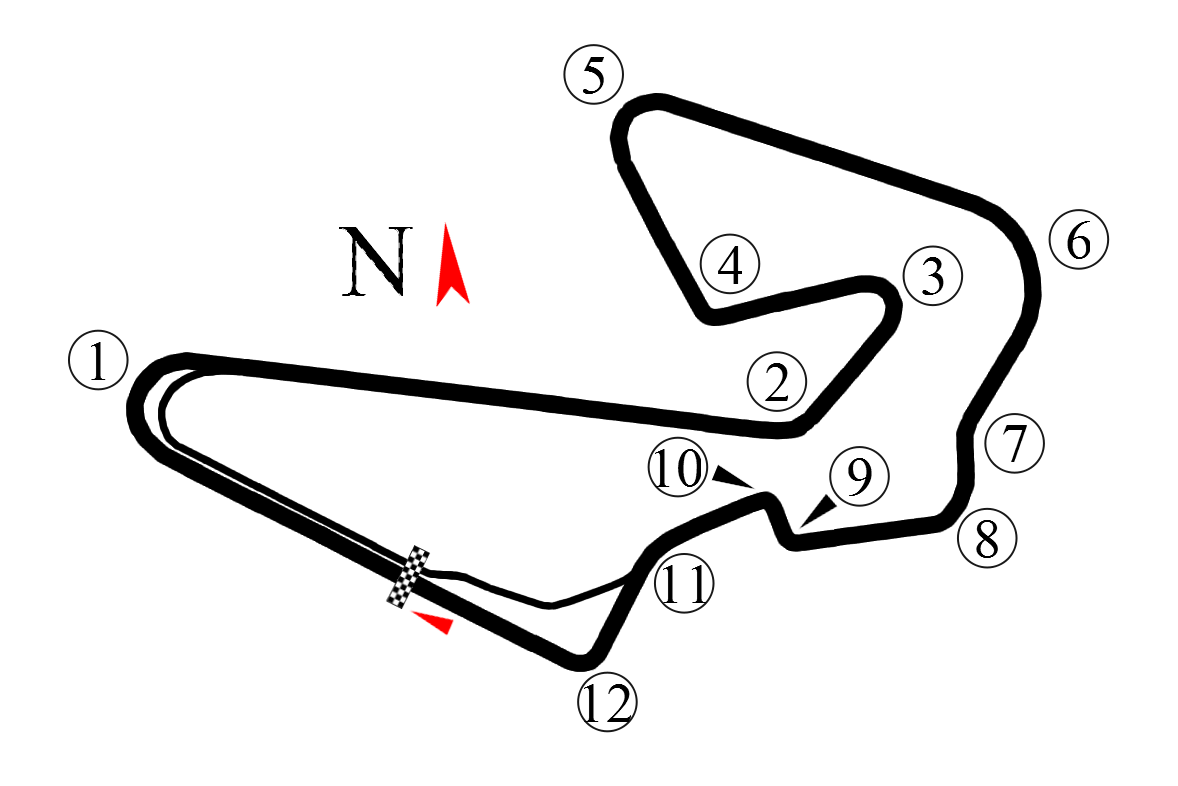
The Johor circuit, used in 1998.

== Winners ==
=== Multiple winners (riders) ===
# Wins	Rider	Wins	
# Wins	Rider	Category	Years won
7	(Italy) Valentino Rossi	MotoGP	2003, 2004, 2006, 2008, 2010
7	(Italy) Valentino Rossi	500cc	2001
7	(Italy) Valentino Rossi	125cc	1997
5	(Australia) Mick Doohan	500cc	1992, 1994, 1995, 1997, 1998
5	(Italy) Max Biaggi	MotoGP	2002
5	(Italy) Max Biaggi	250cc	1994, 1995, 1996, 1997
5	(Spain) Dani Pedrosa	MotoGP	2012, 2013, 2015
5	(Spain) Dani Pedrosa	250cc	2004
5	(Spain) Dani Pedrosa	125cc	2003
4	(Australia) Casey Stoner	MotoGP	2007, 2009
4	(Australia) Casey Stoner	250cc	2005
4	(Australia) Casey Stoner	125cc	2004
4	(Spain) Marc Márquez	MotoGP	2014, 2018, 2026
4	(Spain) Marc Márquez	125cc	2010
3	(Italy) Luca Cadalora	500cc	1996
3	(Italy) Luca Cadalora	250cc	1991, 1992
3	(Italy) Loris Capirossi	MotoGP	2005
3	(Italy) Loris Capirossi	250cc	1999
3	(Italy) Loris Capirossi	125cc	1991
3	(Spain) Maverick Viñales	MotoGP	2019
3	(Spain) Maverick Viñales	Moto2	2014
3	(Spain) Maverick Viñales	125cc	2011
3	(Italy) Francesco Bagnaia	MotoGP	2022, 2024
3	(Italy) Francesco Bagnaia	Moto3	2016
2	(Japan) Noboru Ueda	125cc	1994, 1998
2	(United States) Kenny Roberts Jr.	500cc	1999, 2000
2	(Spain) Álvaro Bautista	250cc	2008
2	(Spain) Álvaro Bautista	125cc	2006
2	(Hungary) Gábor Talmácsi	125cc	2007, 2008
2	(Japan) Hiroshi Aoyama	250cc	2007, 2009
2	(Switzerland) Thomas Lüthi	Moto2	2011
2	(Switzerland) Thomas Lüthi	125cc	2005
2	(France) Johann Zarco	Moto2	2015, 2016
2	(Portugal) Miguel Oliveira	Moto2	2017
2	(Portugal) Miguel Oliveira	Moto3	2015
2	(Italy) Andrea Dovizioso	MotoGP	2016, 2017
2	(Colombia) David Alonso	Moto2	2026
2	(Colombia) David Alonso	Moto3	2024

=== Multiple winners (manufacturers) ===
# Wins	Manufacturer	Wins	
# Wins	Manufacturer	Category	Years won
34	(Japan) Honda	MotoGP	2003, 2012, 2013, 2014, 2015, 2018
34	(Japan) Honda	500cc	1992, 1994, 1995, 1996, 1997, 1998, 2001
34	(Japan) Honda	250cc	1991, 1992, 1993, 1997, 1999, 2001, 2004, 2009
34	(Japan) Honda	Moto3	2014, 2017, 2018, 2019, 2025
34	(Japan) Honda	125cc	1991, 1993, 1994, 1995, 1998, 1999, 2003, 2005
19	(Italy) Aprilia	250cc	1994, 1995, 1996, 1998, 2002, 2003, 2005, 2006, 2008
19	(Italy) Aprilia	125cc	1992, 1996, 1997, 2000, 2002, 2006, 2007, 2008, 2009, 2011
10	(Italy) Ducati	MotoGP	2005, 2007, 2009, 2016, 2017, 2022, 2023, 2024, 2025, 2026
9	(Japan) Yamaha	MotoGP	2002, 2004, 2006, 2008, 2010, 2019
9	(Japan) Yamaha	500cc	1991, 1993
9	(Japan) Yamaha	250cc	2000
8	(Austria) KTM	Moto2	2017, 2019
8	(Austria) KTM	250cc	2007
8	(Austria) KTM	Moto3	2012, 2013, 2015, 2026
8	(Austria) KTM	125cc	2004
8	(Germany) Kalex	Moto2	2013, 2014, 2015, 2016, 2018, 2022, 2024, 2026
2	(Japan) Suzuki	500cc	1999, 2000
2	(Spain) Derbi	125cc	2001, 2010
2	(Switzerland) Suter	Moto2	2010, 2011
2	(Sweden) Husqvarna	Moto3	2022, 2023
2	(Italy) Boscoscuro	Moto2	2023, 2025

=== By year ===
Year	Track	Moto3		Moto2		MotoGP		Report
Year	Track	Rider	Manufacturer	Rider	Manufacturer	Rider	Manufacturer	Report
2026	Sepang	(Spain) Máximo Quiles	KTM	(Colombia) David Alonso	Kalex	(Spain) Marc Márquez	Ducati	Report
2025	Sepang	(Japan) Taiyo Furusato	Honda	(United Kingdom) Jake Dixon	Boscoscuro	(Spain) Álex Márquez	Ducati	Report
2024	Sepang	(Colombia) David Alonso	CFMoto	(Italy) Celestino Vietti	Kalex	(Italy) Francesco Bagnaia	Ducati	Report
2023	Sepang	(Netherlands) Collin Veijer	Husqvarna	(Spain) Fermín Aldeguer	Boscoscuro	(Italy) Enea Bastianini	Ducati	Report
2022	Sepang	(United Kingdom) John McPhee	Husqvarna	(Italy) Tony Arbolino	Kalex	(Italy) Francesco Bagnaia	Ducati	Report
2021	Sepang	Cancelled due to COVID-19 concerns						
2020	Sepang	Cancelled due to COVID-19 concerns						
2019	Sepang	(Italy) Lorenzo Dalla Porta	Honda	(South Africa) Brad Binder	KTM	(Spain) Maverick Viñales	Yamaha	Report
2018	Sepang	(Spain) Jorge Martín	Honda	(Italy) Luca Marini	Kalex	(Spain) Marc Márquez	Honda	Report
2017	Sepang	(Spain) Joan Mir	Honda	(Portugal) Miguel Oliveira	KTM	(Italy) Andrea Dovizioso	Ducati	Report
2016	Sepang	(Italy) Francesco Bagnaia	Mahindra	(France) Johann Zarco	Kalex	(Italy) Andrea Dovizioso	Ducati	Report
2015	Sepang	(Portugal) Miguel Oliveira	KTM	(France) Johann Zarco	Kalex	(Spain) Dani Pedrosa	Honda	Report
2014	Sepang	(Spain) Efrén Vázquez	Honda	(Spain) Maverick Viñales	Kalex	(Spain) Marc Márquez	Honda	Report
2013	Sepang	(Spain) Luis Salom	KTM	(Spain) Esteve Rabat	Kalex	(Spain) Dani Pedrosa	Honda	Report
2012	Sepang	(Germany) Sandro Cortese	KTM	(San Marino) Alex de Angelis	FTR	(Spain) Dani Pedrosa	Honda	Report
Year	Track	125cc		Moto2		MotoGP		Report
Year	Track	Rider	Manufacturer	Rider	Manufacturer	Rider	Manufacturer	Report
2011	Sepang	(Spain) Maverick Viñales	Aprilia	(Switzerland) Thomas Lüthi	Suter	Abandoned (Art. 1.25.2) (Note: The 2011 MotoGP race was cancelled because of a crash on the second lap that resulted in the death of Marco Simoncelli. Under Article 1.25.2 in the regulations, all motorcycles on the same lap as the leader must finish three complete laps for a race to be official. As only one lap had been completed, the race was abandoned.)		Report
2010	Sepang	(Spain) Marc Márquez	Derbi	(Italy) Roberto Rolfo	Suter	(Italy) Valentino Rossi	Yamaha	Report
Year	Track	125cc		250cc		MotoGP		Report
Year	Track	Rider	Manufacturer	Rider	Manufacturer	Rider	Manufacturer	Report
2009	Sepang	(Spain) Julián Simón	Aprilia	(Japan) Hiroshi Aoyama	Honda	(Australia) Casey Stoner	Ducati	Report
2008	Sepang	(Hungary) Gábor Talmácsi	Aprilia	(Spain) Álvaro Bautista	Aprilia	(Italy) Valentino Rossi	Yamaha	Report
2007	Sepang	(Hungary) Gábor Talmácsi	Aprilia	(Japan) Hiroshi Aoyama	KTM	(Australia) Casey Stoner	Ducati	Report
2006	Sepang	(Spain) Álvaro Bautista	Aprilia	(Spain) Jorge Lorenzo	Aprilia	(Italy) Valentino Rossi	Yamaha	Report
2005	Sepang	(Switzerland) Thomas Lüthi	Honda	(Australia) Casey Stoner	Aprilia	(Italy) Loris Capirossi	Ducati	Report
2004	Sepang	(Australia) Casey Stoner	KTM	(Spain) Daniel Pedrosa	Honda	(Italy) Valentino Rossi	Yamaha	Report
2003	Sepang	(Spain) Daniel Pedrosa	Honda	(Spain) Toni Elías	Aprilia	(Italy) Valentino Rossi	Honda	Report
2002	Sepang	(France) Arnaud Vincent	Aprilia	(Spain) Fonsi Nieto	Aprilia	(Italy) Max Biaggi	Yamaha	Report
Year	Track	125cc		250cc		500cc		Report
Year	Track	Rider	Manufacturer	Rider	Manufacturer	Rider	Manufacturer	Report
2001	Sepang	(Japan) Youichi Ui	Derbi	(Japan) Daijiro Kato	Honda	(Italy) Valentino Rossi	Honda	Report
2000	Sepang	(Italy) Roberto Locatelli	Aprilia	(Japan) Shinya Nakano	Yamaha	(United States) Kenny Roberts Jr.	Suzuki	Report
1999	Sepang	(Japan) Masao Azuma	Honda	(Italy) Loris Capirossi	Honda	(United States) Kenny Roberts Jr.	Suzuki	Report
1998	Johor	(Japan) Noboru Ueda	Honda	(Japan) Tetsuya Harada	Aprilia	(Australia) Mick Doohan	Honda	Report
1997	Shah Alam	(Italy) Valentino Rossi	Aprilia	(Italy) Max Biaggi	Honda	(Australia) Mick Doohan	Honda	Report
1996	Shah Alam	(Italy) Stefano Perugini	Aprilia	(Italy) Max Biaggi	Aprilia	(Italy) Luca Cadalora	Honda	Report
1995	Shah Alam	(Australia) Garry McCoy	Honda	(Italy) Max Biaggi	Aprilia	(Australia) Mick Doohan	Honda	Report
1994	Shah Alam	(Japan) Noboru Ueda	Honda	(Italy) Max Biaggi	Aprilia	(Australia) Mick Doohan	Honda	Report
1993	Shah Alam	(Germany) Dirk Raudies	Honda	(Japan) Nobuatsu Aoki	Honda	(United States) Wayne Rainey	Yamaha	Report
1992	Shah Alam	(Italy) Alessandro Gramigni	Aprilia	(Italy) Luca Cadalora	Honda	(Australia) Mick Doohan	Honda	Report
1991	Shah Alam	(Italy) Loris Capirossi	Honda	(Italy) Luca Cadalora	Honda	(United States) John Kocinski	Yamaha	Report
