= Tadayuki Okada =

Japanese motorcycle racer

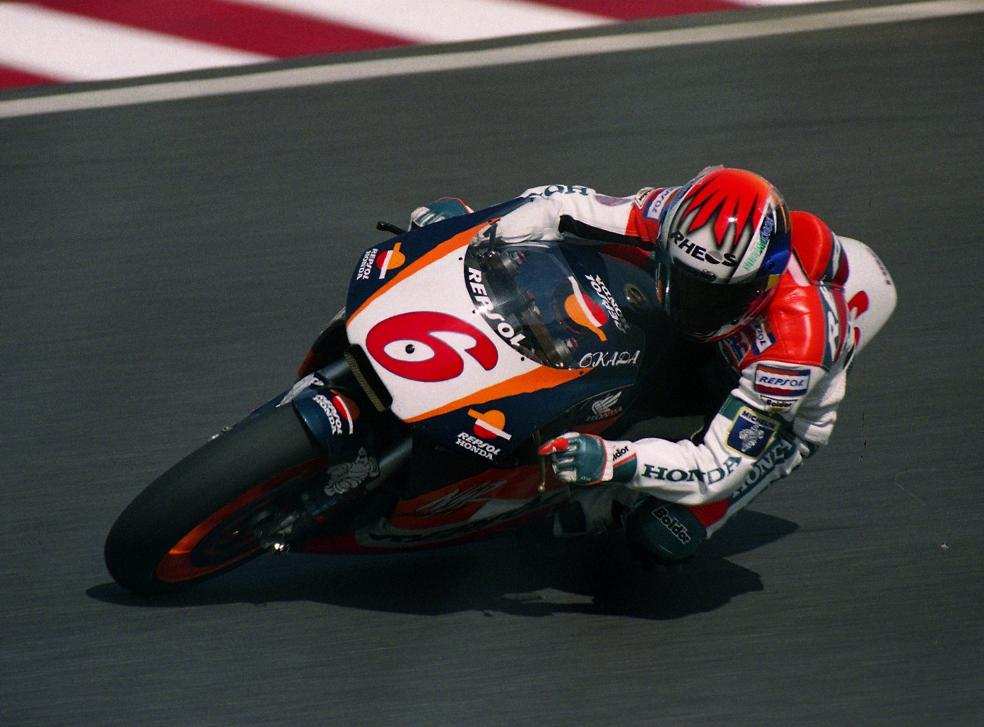
- Tadayuki Okada on the Honda NSR500V
- Nationality: Japanese
- Born: February 13, 1967 (age 59)
Motorcycle racing career statistics
Grand Prix motorcycle racing
Active years	1989 - 2000, 2008
First race	1989 250cc Japanese Grand Prix
Last race	2008 MotoGP Italian Grand Prix
First win	1994 250cc Japanese Grand Prix
Last win	1999 500cc Australian Grand Prix
Team	Honda
Championships	None
Starts / Wins / Podiums / Poles / F. laps / Points; 116 / 6 / 36 / 7 / 8 / 1250
Superbike World Championship
Active years	2001
Manufacturers	Honda
2001 championship position	8th
Starts / Wins / Podiums / Poles / F. laps / Points; 25 / 0 / 3 / 0 / 0 / 176

Tadayuki 'Taddy' Okada (Japanese: 岡田 忠之, Hepburn: Okada Tadayuki; born February 13, 1967) is a Japanese former professional Grand Prix motorcycle road racer. He was runner-up in the 1994 250cc and in the 1997 500cc World Championship.

== Early career ==
Okada won the 250cc All Japan Road Race Championship in three successive years from 1989 to 1991 for Honda. Honda then entered him into the 250cc World Championship in 1993. He was runner-up in the series in 1994, and fourth in 1995.

== 500cc and beyond ==
Okada stepped up to 500cc in 1996, helping develop the V-twin Honda NSR500V and finished the season in seventh overall. In 1997, he claimed his first 500cc win in Indonesia and finished second to Mick Doohan. He missed several races in 1998 due to a wrist injury but bounced back in 1999 to finish third in the championship, with wins at Assen, Brno and Phillip Island. Going into the final round of the season, he was second in points, but lost out to final-race winner Kenny Roberts Jr. After a largely unsuccessful 2000, he switched to the Superbike World Championship for 2001, without winning a race although taking three podium finishes and eighth overall. Okada chose to retire at the end of the year. He made a one-off wildcard appearance at the 2008 Italian Grand Prix at Mugello in June, finishing 14th, in the first race for the pneumatic valved Honda RC212V.

== Grand Prix career statistics ==
Points system from 1988 to 1992:

**Position**	1	2	3	4	5	6	7	8	9	10	11	12	13	14	15
**Points**	20	17	15	13	11	10	9	8	7	6	5	4	3	2	1

Points system from 1993 onwards:

**Position**	1	2	3	4	5	6	7	8	9	10	11	12	13	14	15
**Points**	25	20	16	13	11	10	9	8	7	6	5	4	3	2	1

(key) (Races in bold indicate pole position)

Year	Class	Team	Machine	1	2	3	4	5	6	7	8	9	10	11	12	13	14	15	16	17	18	Points	Rank	Wins
1989	250cc	Cabin-Honda	NSR250	JPN; 6	AUS -	USA -	ESP -	NAT -	GER -	AUT -	YUG -	NED -	BEL -	FRA -	GBR -	SWE -	CZE -	BRA -				10	28th	0
1990	250cc	Honda	NSR250	JPN; RET	USA -	ESP -	NAT -	GER -	AUT -	YUG -	NED -	BEL -	FRA -	GBR -	SWE -	CZE -	HUN -	AUS -				0	-	0
1991	250cc	Honda	NSR250	JPN; RET	AUS -	USA -	ESP -	ITA -	GER -	AUT -	EUR -	NED -	FRA -	GBR -	RSM -	CZE -	VDM -	MAL -				0	-	0
1992	250cc	HRC-Honda	NSR250	JPN; 2	AUS -	MAL -	ESP -	ITA -	EUR -	GER -	NED -	HUN -	FRA -	GBR -	BRA -	RSA -						15	13th	0
1993	250cc	Rothmans-Honda	NSR250	AUS; 4	MAL; 3	JPN; 2	ESP; 7	AUT; RET	GER; INJ	NED; RET	EUR; 2	RSM; 6	GBR; 5	CZE; 11	ITA; 7	USA; 9	FIM; RET					120	8th	0
1994	250cc	Kanemoto-Honda	NSR250	AUS; 5	MAL; 2	JPN; 1	ESP; 3	AUT; 4	GER; 5	NED; 2	ITA; 7	FRA; 9	GBR; 2	CZE; 5	USA; 4	ARG; 1	EUR; 4					**214**	**2nd**	**2**
1995	250cc	HRC-Honda	NSR250	AUS; RET	MAL; 3	JPN; RET	ESP; 6	GER; 3	ITA; 5	NED; 3	FRA; 3	GBR; 8	CZE; 7	BRA; 3	ARG; 7	EUR; 7						136	4th	0
1996	500cc	Repsol Honda	NSR500V	**MAL**; RET	INA; RET	JPN; 4	ESP; 3	ITA; 7	FRA; RET	NED; 13	GER; 7	GBR; 4	AUT; 11	CZE; 7	IMO; 3	CAT; 5	BRA; 8	AUS; 2				132	7th	0
1997	500cc	Repsol Honda	NSR500	**MAL**; 10	**JPN**; 3	**ESP**; 3	ITA; RET	AUT; 2	FRA; 3	NED; 12	IMO; 5	GER; 2	BRA; 2	GBR; 2	CZE; RET	CAT; 6	INA; 1	AUS; 4				**197**	**2nd**	**1**
1998	500cc	Repsol Honda	NSR500	JPN; 2	MAL; RET	ESP; 7	ITA; INJ	FRA; INJ	MAD; INJ	NED; 8	GBR; INJ	GER; INJ	CZE; 4	IMO; 7	CAT; 2	AUS; 9	ARG; 2					106	8th	0
1999	500cc	Repsol Honda	NSR500	MAL; 5	JPN; 15	ESP; 4	FRA; 9	ITA; 3	CAT; 2	**NED**; 1	**GBR**; 2	GER; RET	CZE; 1	IMO; 4	VAL; 4	AUS; 1	**RSA**; 4	BRA; 7	ARG; RET			**211**	**3rd**	**3**
2000	500cc	Repsol-Honda	NSR500	RSA; RET	MAL; 6	JPN; 3	ESP; 10	FRA; 14	ITA; 8	CAT; 15	NED; 11	GBR; 10	GER; 5	CZE; 10	POR; 7	VAL; 9	BRA; 9	PAC; 10	AUS; 9			107	11th	0
2008	MotoGP	Repsol-Honda	RC212V	QAT -	ESP -	POR -	CHN -	FRA -	ITA; 14	CAT -	GBR -	NED -	GER -	USA -	CZE -	RSM -	INP -	JPN -	AUS -	MAL -	VAL -	2	21st	0

=== Suzuka 8 Hours results ===
Year	Team	Co-Rider	Bike	Pos
1995	(Japan) Team HRC	(New Zealand) Aaron Slight (Japan) Tadayuki Okada	Honda RVF750 RC45	1st
1999	(Japan) Lucky Strike Honda	(Japan) Tadayuki Okada (Brazil) Alex Barros	Honda RVF750 RC45	1st
