= 1995 Australian motorcycle Grand Prix =

(Australia) 1995 Australian Grand Prix
Race details
- Race 1 of 13 races in the 1995 Grand Prix motorcycle racing season
- Date: 26 March 1995
- Official name: Australian Motorcycle Grand Prix
- Location: Eastern Creek Raceway
- Course: Permanent racing facility; 3.930 km (2.442 mi)

MotoGP
Pole position
- Rider: (Australia) Mick Doohan
- Time: 1:30.580
Fastest lap
- Rider: (Australia) Mick Doohan
- Time: 1:31.501
Podium
- First: (Australia) Mick Doohan
- Second: (Australia) Daryl Beattie
- Third: (Spain) Àlex Crivillé

250cc
Pole position
- Rider: (Italy) Max Biaggi
- Time: 1:32.630
Fastest lap
- Rider: (Japan) Tetsuya Harada
- Time: 1:33.065
Podium
- First: (Germany) Ralf Waldmann
- Second: (Japan) Tetsuya Harada
- Third: (Italy) Max Biaggi

125cc
Pole position
- Rider: (Germany) Dirk Raudies
- Time: 1:37.380
Fastest lap
- Rider: (Japan) Haruchika Aoki
- Time: 1:37.323
Podium
- First: (Japan) Haruchika Aoki
- Second: (Japan) Kazuto Sakata
- Third: (Japan) Tomomi Manako

The 1995 Australian motorcycle Grand Prix was the first round of the 1995 Grand Prix motorcycle racing season. It took place on 26 March 1995 at Eastern Creek Raceway.

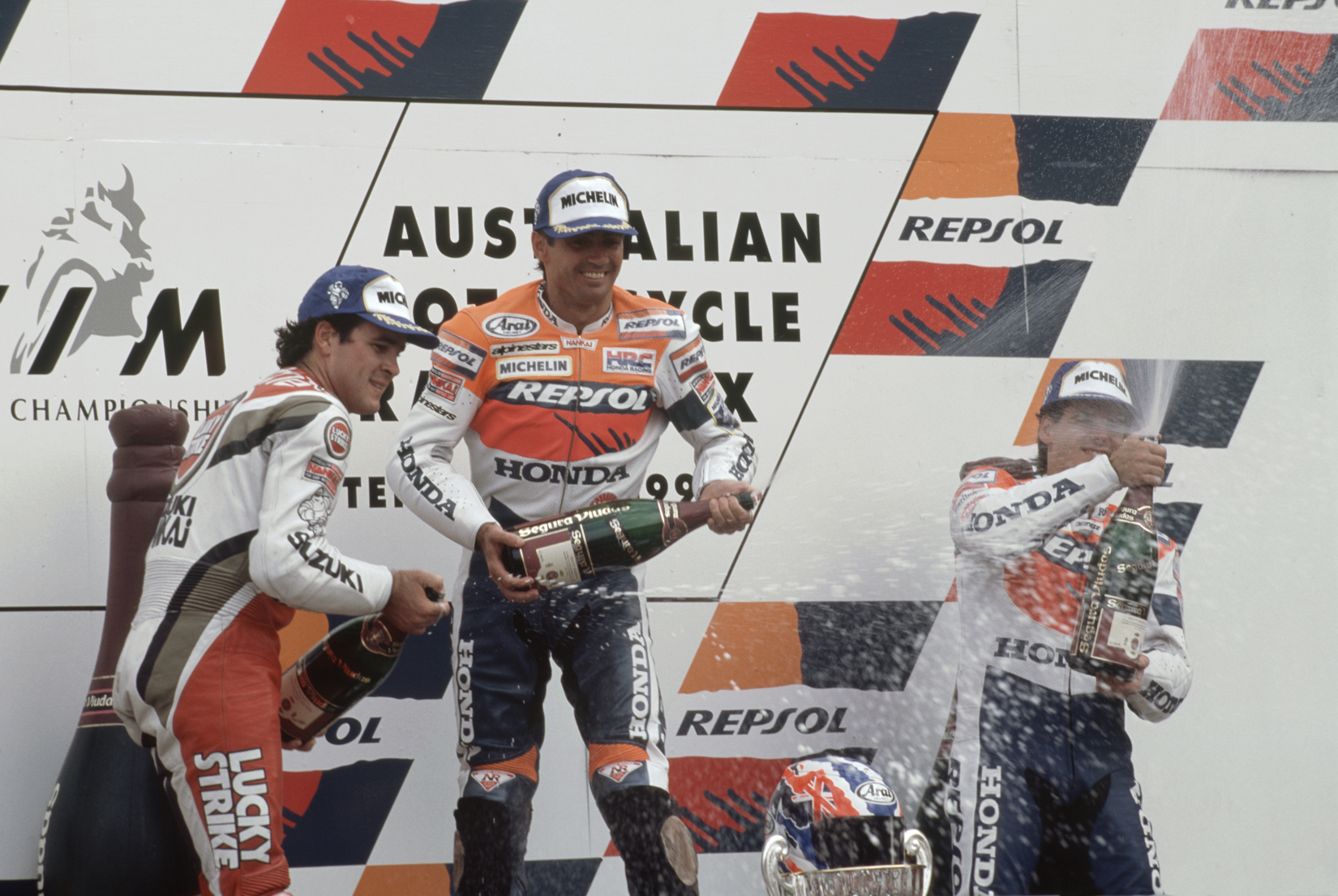
Daryl Beattie, Mick Doohan and Àlex Crivillé, spraying the champagne on the podium after finishing second, first and third at the 500cc race.

== 500 cc classification ==
Pos.	Rider	Team	Manufacturer	Time/Retired	Points
1	(Australia) Mick Doohan	Repsol YPF Honda Team	Honda	46:06.030	25
2	(Australia) Daryl Beattie	Lucky Strike Suzuki	Suzuki	+13.446	20
3	(Spain) Àlex Crivillé	Repsol YPF Honda Team	Honda	+19.068	16
4	(Italy) Luca Cadalora	Marlboro Team Roberts	Yamaha	+33.753	13
5	(United States) Kevin Schwantz	Lucky Strike Suzuki	Suzuki	+34.372	11
6	(Brazil) Alex Barros	Kanemoto Honda	Suzuki	+36.000	10
7	(Spain) Alberto Puig	Fortuna Honda Pons	Honda	+38.621	9
8	(Italy) Loris Capirossi	Marlboro Team Pileri	Honda	+44.854	8
9	(Japan) Norifumi Abe	Marlboro Team Roberts	Yamaha	+46.474	7
10	(Japan) Shinichi Itoh	Repsol YPF Honda Team	Honda	+1:04.782	6
11	(Italy) Loris Reggiani	Aprilia Racing Team	Aprilia	+1:05.494	5
12	(United Kingdom) Sean Emmett	Harris Grand Prix	Harris Yamaha	+1 Lap	4
13	(France) Bernard Garcia	Team ROC NRJ	ROC Yamaha	+1 Lap	3
14	(Italy) Cristiano Migliorati	Harris Grand Prix	Harris Yamaha	+1 Lap	2
15	(Switzerland) Adrien Bosshard	Thommen Elf Racing	ROC Yamaha	+1 Lap	1
16	(Belgium) Laurent Naveau	Thommen Elf Racing	ROC Yamaha	+1 Lap	
17	(New Zealand) Andrew Stroud	Team Max	ROC Yamaha	+1 Lap	
18	(France) Frederic Protat	FP Racing	ROC Yamaha	+1 Lap	
19	(Australia) Martin Craggill	Team Rainey	Harris Yamaha	+1 Lap	
20	(United Kingdom) Neil Hodgson	World Championship Motorsports	ROC Yamaha	+1 Lap	
21	(United Kingdom) Eugene McManus	Padgett's Racing Team	Harris Yamaha	+1 Lap	
22	(Italy) Lucio Pedercini	Team Pedercini	ROC Yamaha	+1 Lap	
23	(United Kingdom) James Haydon	Harris Grand Prix	Harris Yamaha	+1 Lap	
24	(France) Marc Garcia	DR Team Shark	ROC Yamaha	+1 Lap	
25	(United Kingdom) Jamie Robinson	Padgett's Racing Team	Harris Yamaha	+1 Lap	
26	(Switzerland) Bernard Haenggeli	Haenggeli Racing	ROC Yamaha	+1 Lap	
27	(France) Bruno Bonhuil	MTD	ROC Yamaha	+1 Lap	
Ret	(United States) Scott Gray	Starsport	ROC Yamaha	Retirement	
Ret	(France) Jean Pierre Jeandat	JPJ Paton	Paton	Retirement	
Ret	(Spain) Juan Borja	Team ROC NRJ	ROC Yamaha	Retirement	
DNS	(United Kingdom) Jeremy McWilliams	Millar Racing	Yamaha	Did not start	

== 250 cc classification ==
Pos	Rider	Manufacturer	Time/Retired	Points
1	(Germany) Ralf Waldmann	Honda	43:52.872	25
2	(Japan) Tetsuya Harada	Yamaha	+0.113	20
3	(Italy) Max Biaggi	Aprilia	+0.146	16
4	(Spain) Carlos Checa	Honda	+37.974	13
5	(Japan) Nobuatsu Aoki	Honda	+38.091	11
6	(Italy) Doriano Romboni	Honda	+40.756	10
7	(United States) Kenny Roberts Jr	Yamaha	+52.406	9
8	(Spain) José Luis Cardoso	Aprilia	+55.493	8
9	(Japan) Takeshi Tsujimura	Honda	+55.962	7
10	(Germany) Jürgen Fuchs	Honda	+57.825	6
11	(Netherlands) Jurgen vd Goorbergh	Honda	+59.186	5
12	(Germany) Adolf Stadler	Aprilia	+1:32.054	4
13	(Switzerland) Eskil Suter	Aprilia	+1 Lap	3
14	(United Kingdom) Marcus Payten	Yamaha	+1 Lap	2
15	(Spain) Gregorio Lavilla	Honda	+1 Lap	1
16	(Spain) Pere Riba	Aprilia	+1 Lap	
17	(United Kingdom) Andy Watts	Honda	+1 Lap	
Ret	(Spain) Miguel Angel Castilla	Yamaha	Retirement	
Ret	(Spain) Luis Maurel	Honda	Retirement	
Ret	(Japan) Sadanori Hikita	Honda	Retirement	
Ret	(United Kingdom) Niall Mackenzie	Aprilia	Retirement	
Ret	(Netherlands) Patrick vd Goorbergh	Aprilia	Retirement	
Ret	(France) Jean-Michel Bayle	Aprilia	Retirement	
Ret	(France) Jean Philippe Ruggia	Honda	Retirement	
Ret	(Germany) Bernd Kassner	Aprilia	Retirement	
Ret	(France) Regis Laconi	Honda	Retirement	
Ret	(Italy) Davide Bulega	Honda	Retirement	
Ret	(Switzerland) Olivier Petrucciani	Aprilia	Retirement	
Ret	(France) Olivier Jacque	Honda	Retirement	
Ret	(Italy) Roberto Locatelli	Aprilia	Retirement	
Ret	(Australia) Craig Connell	Yamaha	Retirement	
Ret	(Japan) Tadayuki Okada	Honda	Retirement	
Ret	(Spain) Luis d'Antin	Honda	Retirement	

== 125 cc classification ==
Pos	Rider	Manufacturer	Time/Retired	Points
1	(Japan) Haruchika Aoki	Honda	42:52.040	25
2	(Japan) Kazuto Sakata	Aprilia	+15.641	20
3	(Japan) Tomomi Manako	Honda	+22.096	16
4	(Spain) Emilio Alzamora	Honda	+22.164	13
5	(Japan) Noboru Ueda	Honda	+24.928	11
6	(Italy) Stefano Perugini	Aprilia	+25.434	10
7	(Japan) Hideyuki Nakajo	Honda	+25.500	9
8	(Italy) Gianluigi Scalvini	Aprilia	+25.886	8
9	(Netherlands) Loek Bodelier	Aprilia	+25.982	7
10	(Japan) Yoshiaki Katoh	Yamaha	+31.241	6
11	(Japan) Akira Saito	Honda	+35.400	5
12	(Japan) Masaki Tokudome	Aprilia	+36.086	4
13	(Spain) Jorge Martinez	Yamaha	+45.413	3
14	(Japan) Tomoko Igata	Honda	+45.588	2
15	(Germany) Oliver Koch	Aprilia	+47.059	1
16	(Japan) Ken Miyasaka	Honda	+55.028	
17	(Italy) Vittorio Lopez	Aprilia	+1:06.502	
18	(Germany) Stefan Prein	Yamaha	+1:06.734	
19	(Germany) Stefan Kurfiss	Yamaha	+1 Lap	
20	(United Kingdom) Glen Richards	Aprilia	+1 Lap	
21	(Japan) Hiroyuki Kikuchi	Honda	+1 Lap	
Ret	(Japan) Takehiro Yamamoto	Honda	Retirement	
Ret	(Germany) Dirk Raudies	Honda	Retirement	
Ret	(Australia) Garry McCoy	Honda	Retirement	
Ret	(Italy) Ivan Cremonini	Honda	Retirement	
Ret	(Italy) Andrea Ballerini	Aprilia	Retirement	
Ret	(Germany) Peter Öttl	Aprilia	Retirement	
Ret	(Germany) Manfred Geissler	Aprilia	Retirement	
Ret	(Spain) Herri Torrontegui	Honda	Retirement	
Ret	(Italy) Gabriele Debbia	Yamaha	Retirement	

Previous race: 1994 European Grand Prix	FIM Grand Prix World Championship; 1995 season	Next race: 1995 Malaysian Grand Prix
Previous race: 1994 Australian Grand Prix	Australian motorcycle Grand Prix	Next race: 1996 Australian Grand Prix
