= 1996 Australian motorcycle Grand Prix =

(Australia) 1996 Australian Grand Prix
Race details
- Race 15 of 15 races in the 1996 Grand Prix motorcycle racing season
- Date: 20 October 1996
- Official name: Australian Motorcycle Grand Prix
- Location: Eastern Creek Raceway
- Course: Permanent racing facility; 3.930 km (2.442 mi)

MotoGP
Pole position
- Rider: (Spain) Àlex Crivillé
- Time: 1:30.478
Fastest lap
- Rider: (Spain) Àlex Crivillé
- Time: 1:30.359
Podium
- First: (Italy) Loris Capirossi
- Second: (Japan) Tadayuki Okada
- Third: (Spain) Carlos Checa

250cc
Pole position
- Rider: (Italy) Max Biaggi
- Time: 1:31.718
Fastest lap
- Rider: (Italy) Max Biaggi
- Time: 1:32.084
Podium
- First: (Italy) Max Biaggi
- Second: (Germany) Ralf Waldmann
- Third: (France) Olivier Jacque

125cc
Pole position
- Rider: (Japan) Haruchika Aoki
- Time: 1:36.080
Fastest lap
- Rider: (Japan) Haruchika Aoki
- Time: 1:36.272
Podium
- First: (Australia) Garry McCoy
- Second: (Japan) Haruchika Aoki
- Third: (Japan) Masaki Tokudome

The 1996 Australian motorcycle Grand Prix was the last round of the 1996 Grand Prix motorcycle racing season. It took place on 20 October 1996 at Eastern Creek Raceway.

== 500 cc classification ==
Pos	Rider	Team	Manufacturer	Time/Retired	Points
1	(Italy) Loris Capirossi	Marlboro Yamaha Roberts	Yamaha	45:47.858	25
2	(Japan) Tadayuki Okada	Team Repsol Honda	Honda	+10.980	20
3	(Spain) Carlos Checa	Fortuna Honda Pons	Honda	+11.397	16
4	(Brazil) Alex Barros	Honda Pileri	Honda	+11.438	13
5	(France) Jean-Michel Bayle	Marlboro Yamaha Roberts	Yamaha	+12.424	11
6	(Spain) Àlex Crivillé	Team Repsol Honda	Honda	+20.394	10
7	(Italy) Luca Cadalora	Kanemoto Honda	Honda	+22.064	9
8	(Australia) Mick Doohan	Team Repsol Honda	Honda	+22.134	8
9	(Japan) Shinichi Itoh	Team Repsol Honda	Honda	+29.821	7
10	(Australia) Peter Goddard	Lucky Strike Suzuki	Suzuki	+32.744	6
11	(United States) Kenny Roberts Jr.	Marlboro Yamaha Roberts	Yamaha	+33.519	5
12	(Italy) Lucio Pedercini	Team Pedercini	ROC Yamaha	+1 Lap	4
13	(France) Frederic Protat	Soverex FP Racing	ROC Yamaha	+1 Lap	3
14	(New Zealand) Andrew Stroud	World Championship Motorsports	ROC Yamaha	+1 Lap	2
15	(Japan) Toshiyuki Arakaki	Team Paton	Paton	+1 Lap	1
16	(Belgium) Stéphane Mertens	Harris Grand Prix	Harris Yamaha	+1 Lap	
Ret	(Spain) Juan Borja	Elf 500 ROC	Elf 500	Retirement	
Ret	(Australia) Paul Young	Padgett's Racing Team	Harris Yamaha	Retirement	
Ret	(Japan) Norifumi Abe	Marlboro Yamaha Roberts	Yamaha	Retirement	
Ret	(Australia) Martin Craggill	Elf 500 ROC	Elf 500	Retirement	
Ret	(United Kingdom) Eugene McManus	Millar Racing	Yamaha	Retirement	
Ret	(United Kingdom) Jeremy McWilliams	QUB Team Optimum	ROC Yamaha	Retirement	
Ret	(Belgium) Laurent Naveau	ELC Lease ROC	ROC Yamaha	Retirement	
Ret	(United States) Scott Russell	Lucky Strike Suzuki	Suzuki	Retirement	

== 250 cc classification ==
Pos	Rider	Manufacturer	Time/Retired	Points
1	(Italy) Max Biaggi	Aprilia	43:21.574	25
2	(Germany) Ralf Waldmann	Honda	+1.730	20
3	(France) Olivier Jacque	Honda	+18.762	16
4	(Japan) Tohru Ukawa	Honda	+25.226	13
5	(Germany) Jürgen Fuchs	Honda	+25.725	11
6	(France) Jean-Philippe Ruggia	Honda	+26.034	10
7	(Japan) Nobuatsu Aoki	Honda	+29.606	9
8	(Spain) Luis d'Antin	Honda	+46.399	8
9	(Italy) Roberto Locatelli	Aprilia	+46.610	7
10	(Japan) Takeshi Tsujimura	Honda	+59.280	6
11	(Netherlands) Jurgen vd Goorbergh	Honda	+59.748	5
12	(France) Regis Laconi	Honda	+59.828	4
13	(Argentina) Sebastian Porto	Aprilia	+1:16.258	3
14	(United Kingdom) Marcus Payten	Honda	+1:26.544	2
15	(Italy) Alessandro Antonello	Aprilia	+1:29.720	1
Ret	(France) Cristophe Cogan	Honda	Retirement	
Ret	(United Kingdom) Jamie Robinson	Aprilia	Retirement	
Ret	(Australia) Craig Connell	Yamaha	Retirement	
Ret	(Italy) Cristiano Migliorati	Honda	Retirement	
Ret	(Switzerland) Olivier Petrucciani	Aprilia	Retirement	
Ret	(Venezuela) José Barresi	Yamaha	Retirement	
Ret	(France) Christian Boudinot	Aprilia	Retirement	
Ret	(Japan) Yasumasa Hatakeyama	Honda	Retirement	
Ret	(Spain) José Luis Cardoso	Aprilia	Retirement	
Ret	(Spain) Sete Gibernau	Yamaha	Retirement	
Ret	(Italy) Luca Boscoscuro	Aprilia	Retirement	
Ret	(Italy) Davide Bulega	Aprilia	Retirement	
Ret	(Italy) Gianluigi Scalvini	Honda	Retirement	
Ret	(Switzerland) Eskil Suter	Aprilia	Retirement	

== 125 cc classification ==
Pos	Rider	Manufacturer	Time/Retired	Points
1	(Australia) Garry McCoy	Aprilia	42:12.903	25
2	(Japan) Haruchika Aoki	Honda	+0.049	20
3	(Japan) Masaki Tokudome	Aprilia	+0.247	16
4	(Spain) Jorge Martinez	Aprilia	+0.533	13
5	(Italy) Ivan Goi	Honda	+9.741	11
6	(Italy) Lucio Cecchinello	Honda	+10.037	10
7	(Japan) Yoshiaki Katoh	Yamaha	+11.987	9
8	(Japan) Noboru Ueda	Honda	+18.127	8
9	(Japan) Tomomi Manako	Honda	+19.405	7
10	(Japan) Akira Saito	Honda	+22.643	6
11	(Germany) Dirk Raudies	Honda	+22.780	5
12	(France) Frederic Petit	Honda	+22.259	4
13	(Italy) Luigi Ancona	Aprilia	+38.669	3
14	(Italy) Valentino Rossi	Aprilia	+51.772	2
15	(Spain) Herri Torrontegui	Honda	+56.713	1
16	(Italy) Mirko Giansanti	Honda	+1:01.819	
17	(Italy) Gabriele Debbia	Yamaha	+1:06.325	
18	(Australia) Andrew Duke	Aprilia	+1 Lap	
19	(Australia) Andrew Willy	Yamaha	+1 Lap	
20	(Australia) Jason van Vliet	Honda	+2 Laps	
Ret	(Germany) Manfred Geissler	Aprilia	Retirement	
Ret	(Italy) Stefano Perugini	Aprilia	Retirement	
Ret	(Spain) Emilio Alzamora	Honda	Retirement	
Ret	(Czech Republic) Jaroslav Hules	Honda	Retirement	
Ret	(Japan) Kazuto Sakata	Aprilia	Retirement	
Ret	(Netherlands) Loek Bodelier	Honda	Retirement	

Previous race: 1996 Rio de Janeiro Grand Prix	FIM Grand Prix World Championship; 1996 season	Next race: 1997 Malaysian Grand Prix
Previous race: 1995 Australian Grand Prix	Australian motorcycle Grand Prix	Next race: 1997 Australian Grand Prix
