= 1998 German motorcycle Grand Prix =

Motorsports event

(Germany) 1998 German Grand Prix
Race details
- Race 9 of 14 races in the 1998 Grand Prix motorcycle racing season
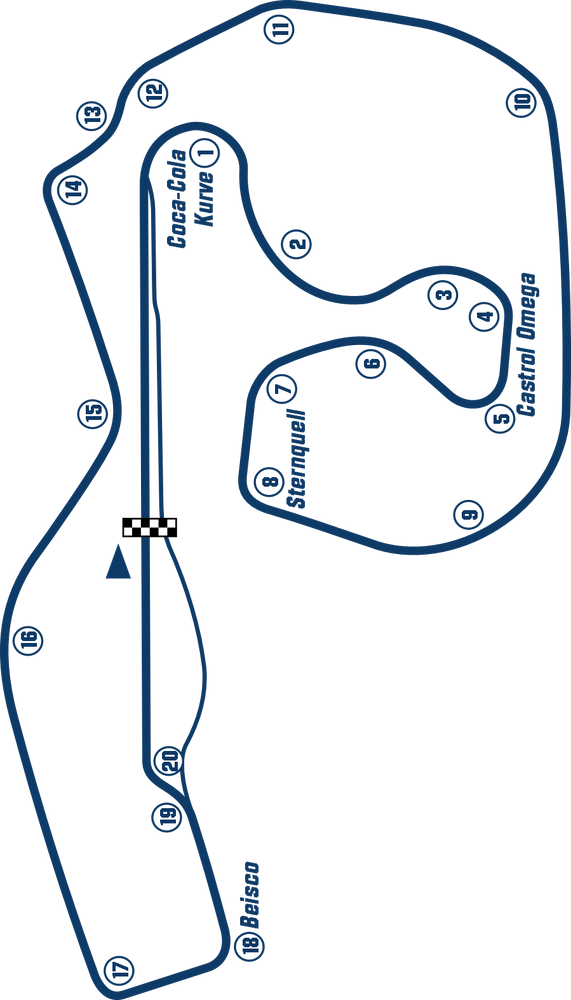
- Date: 19 July 1998
- Official name: Polini Motorrad Grand Prix Deutschland
- Location: Sachsenring
- Course: Permanent racing facility; 3.508 km (2.180 mi)

500cc
Pole position
- Rider: (Italy) Max Biaggi
- Time: 1:27.894
Fastest lap
- Rider: (Brazil) Alex Barros
- Time: 1:28.381 on lap 3
Podium
- First: (Australia) Mick Doohan
- Second: (Italy) Max Biaggi
- Third: (Spain) Àlex Crivillé

250cc
Pole position
- Rider: (Japan) Tetsuya Harada
- Time: 1:28.684
Fastest lap
- Rider: (Japan) Tetsuya Harada
- Time: 1:28.625 on lap 3
Podium
- First: (Japan) Tetsuya Harada
- Second: (United Kingdom) Jeremy McWilliams
- Third: (Italy) Valentino Rossi

125cc
Pole position
- Rider: (Italy) Marco Melandri
- Time: 1:30.793
Fastest lap
- Rider: (Japan) Tomomi Manako
- Time: 1:30.838 on lap 28
Podium
- First: (Japan) Tomomi Manako
- Second: (France) Arnaud Vincent
- Third: (Italy) Roberto Locatelli

The 1998 German motorcycle Grand Prix was the ninth round of the 1998 Grand Prix motorcycle racing season. It took place on 19 July 1998 at the Sachsenring.

== 500 cc classification ==
Pos.	No.	Rider	Team	Manufacturer	Laps	Time/Retired	Grid	Points
1	1	(Australia) Mick Doohan	Repsol Honda	Honda	31	46:00.876	3	25
2	6	(Italy) Max Biaggi	Marlboro Team Kanemoto	Honda	31	+2.873	1	20
3	4	(Spain) Àlex Crivillé	Repsol Honda	Honda	31	+11.379	7	16
4	9	(Brazil) Alex Barros	Honda Gresini	Honda	31	+11.533	6	13
5	55	(France) Régis Laconi	Red Bull Yamaha WCM	Yamaha	31	+19.093	4	11
6	10	(United States) Kenny Roberts Jr.	Team Roberts	Modenas KR3	31	+30.087	2	10
7	28	(Germany) Ralf Waldmann	Marlboro Team Roberts	Modenas KR3	31	+34.881	11	9
8	17	(Netherlands) Jurgen van den Goorbergh	Dee Cee Jeans Racing Team	Honda	31	+35.033	10	8
9	21	(Japan) Kyoji Nanba	Yamaha Team Rainey	Yamaha	31	+46.078	13	7
10	3	(Japan) Nobuatsu Aoki	Suzuki Grand Prix Team	Suzuki	31	+48.684	12	6
11	39	(Spain) Gregorio Lavilla	Movistar Honda Pons	Honda	31	+58.019	17	5
12	26	(France) Bernard Garcia	Tecmas Honda Elf	Honda	31	+1:03.165	19	4
13	77	(Switzerland) Eskil Suter	MuZ Roc RennSport	MuZ	31	+1:10.827	14	3
14	23	(United States) Matt Wait	FCC TSR	Honda	31	+1:10.941	18	2
15	72	(Spain) Fernando Cristóbal	Shell Advance Racing	Honda	31	+1:31.896	20	1
16	57	(Italy) Fabio Carpani	Team Polini Inoxmacel	Honda	30	+1 lap	21	
Ret	18	(Australia) Garry McCoy	Shell Advance Racing	Honda	30	Retirement	15	
Ret	15	(Spain) Sete Gibernau	Repsol Honda	Honda	29	Retirement	9	
Ret	88	(United Kingdom) Scott Smart	Team Millar Honda Britain	Honda	26	Retirement	16	
Ret	11	(New Zealand) Simon Crafar	Red Bull Yamaha WCM	Yamaha	11	Accident	5	
Ret	5	(Japan) Norick Abe	Yamaha Team Rainey	Yamaha	5	Accident	8	
WD	60	(Germany) Jörg Schöllhorn	Team Zupin	Honda		Withdrew		

== 250 cc classification ==
Pos.	No.	Rider	Manufacturer	Laps	Time/Retired	Grid	Points
1	31	(Japan) Tetsuya Harada	Aprilia	30	44:43.421	1	25
2	9	(United Kingdom) Jeremy McWilliams	TSR-Honda	30	+9.033	7	20
3	46	(Italy) Valentino Rossi	Aprilia	30	+9.267	4	16
4	65	(Italy) Loris Capirossi	Aprilia	30	+10.611	2	13
5	24	(United Kingdom) Jason Vincent	TSR-Honda	30	+38.261	8	11
6	7	(Japan) Takeshi Tsujimura	Yamaha	30	+43.611	10	10
7	17	(Spain) José Luis Cardoso	Yamaha	30	+45.243	13	9
8	37	(Italy) Luca Boscoscuro	TSR-Honda	30	+45.702	16	8
9	12	(Japan) Noriyasu Numata	Suzuki	30	+49.915	12	7
10	66	(Germany) Alex Hofmann	Honda	30	+51.523	11	6
11	44	(Italy) Roberto Rolfo	TSR-Honda	30	+54.914	18	5
12	8	(Spain) Luis d'Antin	Yamaha	30	+1:20.499	17	4
13	14	(Italy) Davide Bulega	ERP Honda	30	+1:23.418	20	3
14	33	(United Kingdom) Jamie Robinson	Yamaha	30	+1:23.915	14	2
15	84	(Germany) Mike Baldinger	Honda	29	+1 lap	24	1
Ret	86	(Germany) Markus Ober	Honda	13	Accident	21	
Ret	85	(Germany) Matthias Neukirchen	Aprilia	13	Accident	25	
Ret	20	(France) William Costes	Honda	10	Retirement	23	
Ret	47	(Italy) Ivan Clementi	Yamaha	9	Accident	19	
Ret	16	(Sweden) Johan Stigefelt	Suzuki	6	Accident	15	
Ret	27	(Argentina) Sebastián Porto	Aprilia	4	Accident	3	
Ret	6	(Japan) Haruchika Aoki	Honda	4	Retirement	9	
Ret	4	(Italy) Stefano Perugini	Honda	3	Accident	5	
Ret	5	(Japan) Tohru Ukawa	Honda	3	Accident	6	
Ret	41	(Argentina) Federico Gartner	Aprilia	0	Accident	22	
Ret	87	(Germany) Adrian Schmidt	Honda	0	Accident	26	
DNS	11	(Germany) Jürgen Fuchs	Aprilia		Did not start		
DNS	25	(Japan) Yasumasa Hatakeyama	ERP Honda		Did not start		
WD	68	(France) Julien Allemand	Honda		Withdrew		

== 125 cc classification ==
Pos.	No.	Rider	Manufacturer	Laps	Time/Retired	Grid	Points
1	3	(Japan) Tomomi Manako	Honda	29	44:37.947	6	25
2	21	(France) Arnaud Vincent	Aprilia	29	+16.513	18	20
3	15	(Italy) Roberto Locatelli	Honda	29	+24.754	9	16
4	52	(Japan) Hiroyuki Kikuchi	Honda	29	+24.771	11	13
5	7	(Spain) Emilio Alzamora	Aprilia	29	+25.778	8	11
6	62	(Japan) Yoshiaki Katoh	Yamaha	29	+28.862	16	10
7	4	(Japan) Kazuto Sakata	Aprilia	29	+37.703	2	9
8	22	(Germany) Steve Jenkner	Aprilia	29	+39.681	10	8
9	5	(Japan) Masaki Tokudome	Aprilia	29	+41.147	7	7
10	29	(Spain) Ángel Nieto, Jr.	Aprilia	29	+49.449	15	6
11	26	(Italy) Ivan Goi	Aprilia	29	+54.783	23	5
12	17	(Spain) Enrique Maturana	Yamaha	29	+54.868	19	4
13	13	(Italy) Marco Melandri	Honda	29	+55.292	1	3
14	65	(Italy) Andrea Iommi	Honda	29	+55.350	21	2
15	16	(Italy) Christian Manna	Yamaha	29	+58.319	25	1
16	85	(Germany) Klaus Nöhles	Honda	29	+1:09.226	20	
17	14	(Italy) Federico Cerroni	Aprilia	29	+1:17.974	17	
18	84	(Germany) Reinhard Stolz	Honda	29	+1:27.436	24	
19	86	(Germany) Oliver Perschke	Yamaha	29	+1:28.176	27	
20	87	(Germany) Dirk Heidolf	Honda	29	+1:29.205	28	
Ret	20	(Japan) Masao Azuma	Honda	10	Retirement	14	
Ret	41	(Japan) Youichi Ui	Yamaha	9	Accident	4	
Ret	32	(Italy) Mirko Giansanti	Honda	9	Accident	3	
Ret	59	(Spain) Jerónimo Vidal	Aprilia	8	Accident	22	
Ret	23	(Italy) Gino Borsoi	Aprilia	7	Accident	5	
Ret	39	(Czech Republic) Jaroslav Huleš	Honda	7	Accident	12	
Ret	88	(Germany) Maik Stief	Yamaha	6	Retirement	26	
Ret	8	(Italy) Gianluigi Scalvini	Honda	3	Accident	13	
DNS	9	(France) Frédéric Petit	Honda		Did not start		
DNS	10	(Italy) Lucio Cecchinello	Honda		Did not start		

== Championship standings after the race (500cc) ==
Below are the standings for the top five riders and constructors after round nine has concluded.

Riders' Championship standings

Pos.	Rider	Points
1	(Australia) Mick Doohan	160
2	(Italy) Max Biaggi	148
3	(Spain) Àlex Crivillé	142
4	(Spain) Carlos Checa	106
5	(New Zealand) Simon Crafar	75

Constructors' Championship standings

Pos.	Constructor	Points
1	(Japan) Honda	220
2	(Japan) Yamaha	127
3	(Japan) Suzuki	81
4	(Malaysia) Modenas KR3	48
5	(Germany) MuZ	9

- Note: Only the top five positions are included for both sets of standings.

Previous race: 1998 British Grand Prix	FIM Grand Prix World Championship; 1998 season	Next race: 1998 Czech Republic Grand Prix
Previous race: 1997 German Grand Prix	German Grand Prix	Next race: 1999 German Grand Prix
