= 1998 Spanish motorcycle Grand Prix =

(Spain) 1998 Spanish Grand Prix
Race details
- Race 3 of 14 races in the 1998 Grand Prix motorcycle racing season
- Date: 3 May 1998
- Official name: Gran Premio Marlboro de España
- Location: Circuito de Jerez
- Course: Permanent racing facility; 4.423 km (2.748 mi)

500cc
Pole position
Rider	(Spain) Carlos Checa	Honda
Time	1:43.467	
Fastest lap
Rider	(Spain) Àlex Crivillé	Honda
Time	1:44.448 on lap 6	
Podium
First	(Spain) Àlex Crivillé	Honda
Second	(Australia) Mick Doohan	Honda
Third	(Italy) Max Biaggi	Honda

250cc
Pole position
Rider	(Italy) Loris Capirossi	Aprilia
Time	1:44.431	
Fastest lap
Rider	(Italy) Loris Capirossi	Aprilia
Time	1:45.250 on lap 4	
Podium
First	(Italy) Loris Capirossi	Aprilia
Second	(Italy) Valentino Rossi	Aprilia
Third	(France) Olivier Jacque	Honda

125cc
Pole position
Rider	(Italy) Roberto Locatelli	Honda
Time	1:49.281	
Fastest lap
Rider	(Japan) Tomomi Manako	Honda
Time	1:49.360 on lap 7	
Podium
First	(Japan) Kazuto Sakata	Aprilia
Second	(Japan) Tomomi Manako	Honda
Third	(Italy) Mirko Giansanti	Honda

The 1998 Spanish motorcycle Grand Prix was the third round of the 1998 Grand Prix motorcycle racing season. It took place on 3 May 1998 at the Circuito Permanente de Jerez.

== 500 cc classification ==
Pos.	No.	Rider	Team	Manufacturer	Laps	Time/Retired	Grid	Points
1	4	(Spain) Àlex Crivillé	Repsol Honda	Honda	27	47:21.522	3	25
2	1	(Australia) Mick Doohan	Repsol Honda	Honda	27	+0.393	5	20
3	6	(Italy) Max Biaggi	Marlboro Team Kanemoto	Honda	27	+0.870	4	16
4	8	(Spain) Carlos Checa	Movistar Honda Pons	Honda	27	+2.368	1	13
5	9	(Brazil) Alex Barros	Honda Gresini	Honda	27	+13.311	8	11
6	5	(Japan) Norick Abe	Yamaha Team Rainey	Yamaha	27	+13.933	11	10
7	2	(Japan) Tadayuki Okada	Repsol Honda	Honda	27	+14.471	2	9
8	3	(Japan) Nobuatsu Aoki	Suzuki Grand Prix Team	Suzuki	27	+24.127	10	8
9	10	(United States) Kenny Roberts Jr.	Team Roberts	Modenas KR3	27	+26.700	7	7
10	28	(Germany) Ralf Waldmann	Marlboro Team Roberts	Modenas KR3	27	+29.597	9	6
11	19	(United States) John Kocinski	Movistar Honda Pons	Honda	27	+31.561	6	5
12	15	(Spain) Sete Gibernau	Repsol Honda	Honda	27	+36.141	12	4
13	11	(New Zealand) Simon Crafar	Red Bull Yamaha WCM	Yamaha	27	+41.486	16	3
14	55	(France) Régis Laconi	Red Bull Yamaha WCM	Yamaha	27	+54.947	13	2
15	18	(Australia) Garry McCoy	Shell Advance Racing	Honda	27	+55.158	20	1
16	21	(Japan) Kyoji Nanba	Yamaha Team Rainey	Yamaha	27	+1:01.172	14	
17	22	(France) Sébastien Gimbert	Tecmas Honda Elf	Honda	27	+1:05.910	19	
18	17	(Netherlands) Jurgen van den Goorbergh	Dee Cee Jeans Racing Team	Honda	27	+1:10.801	18	
19	25	(Japan) Yukio Kagayama	Suzuki Grand Prix Team	Suzuki	27	+1:32.385	15	
20	23	(United States) Matt Wait	FCC TSR	Honda	27	+1:33.597	21	
21	88	(United Kingdom) Scott Smart	Team Millar Honda Britain	Honda	26	+1 lap	22	
22	58	(Portugal) Felisberto Teixeira	Shell Advance Racing	Honda	26	+1 lap	24	
Ret	57	(Italy) Fabio Carpani	Team Polini Inoxmacel	Honda	15	Retirement	23	
Ret	14	(Spain) Juan Borja	Shell Advance Racing	Honda	13	Retirement	17	

== 250 cc classification ==
Pos.	No.	Rider	Manufacturer	Laps	Time/Retired	Grid	Points
1	65	(Italy) Loris Capirossi	Aprilia	26	46:00.131	1	25
2	46	(Italy) Valentino Rossi	Aprilia	26	+3.415	3	20
3	19	(France) Olivier Jacque	Honda	26	+7.576	6	16
4	5	(Japan) Tohru Ukawa	Honda	26	+8.186	8	13
5	34	(Italy) Marcellino Lucchi	Aprilia	26	+14.337	2	11
6	6	(Japan) Haruchika Aoki	Honda	26	+24.939	10	10
7	4	(Italy) Stefano Perugini	Honda	26	+28.435	9	9
8	7	(Japan) Takeshi Tsujimura	Yamaha	26	+31.492	11	8
9	8	(Spain) Luis d'Antin	Yamaha	26	+45.003	15	7
10	18	(Japan) Osamu Miyazaki	Yamaha	26	+45.558	16	6
11	37	(Italy) Luca Boscoscuro	TSR-Honda	26	+45.999	18	5
12	21	(Italy) Franco Battaini	Yamaha	26	+49.032	20	4
13	44	(Italy) Roberto Rolfo	TSR-Honda	26	+1:04.043	19	3
14	12	(Japan) Noriyasu Numata	Suzuki	26	+1:07.866	17	2
15	20	(France) William Costes	Honda	26	+1:37.376	22	1
16	25	(Japan) Yasumasa Hatakeyama	Honda	25	+1 lap	23	
17	59	(Spain) Ismael Bonilla	Honda	25	+1 lap	27	
18	41	(Argentina) Federico Gartner	Aprilia	25	+1 lap	26	
Ret	11	(Germany) Jürgen Fuchs	Aprilia	23	Retirement	5	
Ret	24	(United Kingdom) Jason Vincent	TSR-Honda	18	Accident	21	
Ret	27	(Argentina) Sebastián Porto	Aprilia	12	Retirement	12	
Ret	17	(Spain) José Luis Cardoso	Yamaha	9	Retirement	7	
DSQ	31	(Japan) Tetsuya Harada	Aprilia	9	Disqualified	4	
Ret	16	(Sweden) Johan Stigefelt	Suzuki	4	Accident	14	
Ret	58	(Spain) Eustaquio Gavira	Honda	4	Retirement	25	
Ret	14	(Italy) Davide Bulega	Honda	2	Retirement	24	
Ret	60	(Spain) Agustín Escobar	Honda	0	Retirement	28	
Ret	9	(United Kingdom) Jeremy McWilliams	TSR-Honda	0	Accident	13	
DNQ	61	(Spain) Manuel Luque	Yamaha		Did not qualify		
OFFICIAL 250cc REPORT

== 125 cc classification ==
Pos.	No.	Rider	Manufacturer	Laps	Time/Retired	Grid	Points
1	4	(Japan) Kazuto Sakata	Aprilia	23	42:19.751	6	25
2	3	(Japan) Tomomi Manako	Honda	23	+2.101	9	20
3	32	(Italy) Mirko Giansanti	Honda	23	+2.229	2	16
4	20	(Japan) Masao Azuma	Honda	23	+2.731	8	13
5	2	(Japan) Noboru Ueda	Honda	23	+8.516	4	11
6	39	(Czech Republic) Jaroslav Huleš	Honda	23	+17.476	12	10
7	41	(Japan) Youichi Ui	Yamaha	23	+28.751	3	9
8	8	(Italy) Gianluigi Scalvini	Honda	23	+28.950	5	8
9	23	(Italy) Gino Borsoi	Aprilia	23	+29.204	10	7
10	13	(Italy) Marco Melandri	Honda	23	+29.213	13	6
11	9	(France) Frédéric Petit	Honda	23	+35.679	17	5
12	5	(Japan) Masaki Tokudome	Aprilia	23	+42.314	11	4
13	29	(Spain) Ángel Nieto, Jr.	Aprilia	23	+42.872	24	3
14	21	(France) Arnaud Vincent	Aprilia	23	+49.952	22	2
15	60	(Spain) Fonsi Nieto	Aprilia	23	+52.822	26	1
16	22	(Germany) Steve Jenkner	Aprilia	23	+53.236	19	
17	11	(Spain) José Ramírez	Aprilia	23	+53.534	18	
18	18	(Italy) Paolo Tessari	Aprilia	23	+1:13.081	14	
19	59	(Spain) Jerónimo Vidal	Aprilia	23	+1:14.135	25	
Ret	19	(Italy) Andrea Ballerini	Honda	16	Accident	20	
Ret	17	(Spain) Enrique Maturana	Yamaha	11	Accident	23	
Ret	10	(Italy) Lucio Cecchinello	Honda	10	Accident	7	
Ret	16	(Italy) Christian Manna	Yamaha	9	Retirement	27	
Ret	7	(Spain) Emilio Alzamora	Aprilia	4	Accident	15	
Ret	15	(Italy) Roberto Locatelli	Honda	3	Accident	1	
Ret	26	(Italy) Ivan Goi	Aprilia	3	Accident	21	
Ret	62	(Japan) Yoshiaki Katoh	Yamaha	1	Accident	16	
Ret	58	(Spain) Álvaro Molina	Honda	1	Retirement	28	
DNS	61	(Spain) Vicente Esparragoso	Yamaha	0	Did not start	29	
OFFICIAL 125cc REPORT

== Championship standings after the race (500cc) ==
Below are the standings for the top five riders and constructors after round three has concluded.

Riders' Championship standings

Pos.	Rider	Points
1	(Italy) Max Biaggi	57
2	(Spain) Àlex Crivillé	51
3	(Australia) Mick Doohan	45
4	(Spain) Carlos Checa	41
5	(Japan) Tadayuki Okada	29

Constructors' Championship standings

Pos.	Constructor	Points
1	(Japan) Honda	75
2	(Japan) Yamaha	35
3	(Japan) Suzuki	28
4	(Malaysia) Modenas KR3	19
5	(Germany) MuZ	4

- Note: Only the top five positions are included for both sets of standings.

Previous race: 1998 Malaysian Grand Prix	FIM Grand Prix World Championship; 1998 season	Next race: 1998 Italian Grand Prix
Previous race: 1997 Spanish Grand Prix	Spanish Grand Prix	Next race: 1999 Spanish Grand Prix
