= 1997 Malaysian motorcycle Grand Prix =

Motorcycle race

(Malaysia) 1997 Malaysian Grand Prix
Race details
- Race 1 of 15 races in the 1997 Grand Prix motorcycle racing season
- Date: 13 April 1997
- Official name: Marlboro Malaysian Grand Prix
- Location: Shah Alam Circuit
- Course: Permanent racing facility; 3.505 km (2.178 mi)

500cc
Pole position
- Rider: (Japan) Tadayuki Okada
- Time: 1:23.485
Fastest lap
- Rider: (Australia) Mick Doohan
- Time: 1:24.840
Podium
- First: (Australia) Mick Doohan
- Second: (Spain) Àlex Crivillé
- Third: (Japan) Nobuatsu Aoki

250cc
Pole position
- Rider: (Italy) Max Biaggi
- Time: 1:25.380
Fastest lap
- Rider: (Italy) Max Biaggi
- Time: 1:26.835
Podium
- First: (Italy) Max Biaggi
- Second: (Japan) Tetsuya Harada
- Third: (France) Olivier Jacque

125cc
Pole position
- Rider: (Italy) Valentino Rossi
- Time: 1:30.720
Fastest lap
- Rider: (Italy) Valentino Rossi
- Time: 1:37.824
Podium
- First: (Italy) Valentino Rossi
- Second: (Japan) Kazuto Sakata
- Third: (Japan) Noboru Ueda

The 1997 Malaysian motorcycle Grand Prix was the first round of the 1997 Grand Prix motorcycle racing season. It took place on 13 April 1997 at the Shah Alam Circuit.

== 500 cc classification ==
Pos.	Rider	Team	Manufacturer	Time/Retired	Points
1	(Australia) Mick Doohan	Repsol YPF Honda Team	Honda	47:11.545	25
2	(Spain) Àlex Crivillé	Repsol YPF Honda Team	Honda	+11.796	20
3	(Japan) Nobuatsu Aoki	Rheos Elf FCC TS	Honda	+13.403	16
4	(Italy) Luca Cadalora	Yamaha Promotor Racing	Yamaha	+22.231	13
5	(Japan) Takuma Aoki	Repsol Honda	Honda	+22.609	11
6	(Spain) Carlos Checa	Movistar Honda Pons	Honda	+35.000	10
7	(Spain) Alberto Puig	Movistar Honda Pons	Honda	+35.000	9
8	(Japan) Norifumi Abe	Yamaha Team Rainey	Yamaha	+35.000	8
9	(Spain) Sete Gibernau	Yamaha Team Rainey	Yamaha	+43.000	7
10	(Japan) Tadayuki Okada	Repsol YPF Honda Team	Honda	+44.000	6
11	(Brazil) Alex Barros	Honda Gresini	Honda	+44.178	5
12	(France) Regis Laconi	Team Tecmas	Honda	+54.819	4
13	(Australia) Troy Corser	Yamaha Promotor Racing	Yamaha	+55.433	3
14	(Spain) Juan Borja	Elf 500 ROC	Elf 500	+56.163	2
15	(Netherlands) Jurgen van den Goorbergh	Team Millar MQP	Honda	+1:11.991	1
16	(Italy) Lucio Pedercini	Team Pedercini	ROC Yamaha	+1 Lap	
17	(Belgium) Laurent Naveau	Millet Racing	ROC Yamaha	+1 Lap	
Ret	(Germany) Jürgen Fuchs	Elf 500 ROC	Elf 500	Retirement	
Ret	(Italy) Alessandro Gramigni	IP Aprilia Racing Team	Aprilia	Retirement	
Ret	(Australia) Kirk McCarthy	World Championship Motorsports	ROC Yamaha	Retirement	
Ret	(France) Jean-Michel Bayle	Marlboro Team Roberts	Modenas KR3	Retirement	
Ret	(France) Frederic Protat	Soverex FP Racing	ROC Yamaha	Retirement	
Ret	(United States) Kenny Roberts Jr.	Marlboro Team Roberts	Modenas KR3	Retirement	
Ret	(Australia) Daryl Beattie	Lucky Strike Suzuki	Suzuki	Retirement	

== 250 cc classification ==
Pos	Rider	Manufacturer	Time/Retired	Points
1	(Italy) Max Biaggi	Honda	45:29.692	25
2	(Japan) Tetsuya Harada	Aprilia	+13.870	20
3	(France) Olivier Jacque	Honda	+31.334	16
4	(Germany) Ralf Waldmann	Honda	+34.599	13
5	(Japan) Haruchika Aoki	Honda	+34.757	11
6	(Japan) Tohru Ukawa	Honda	+1:04.000	10
7	(Spain) Emilio Alzamora	Honda	+1 Lap	9
8	(Italy) Cristiano Migliorati	Honda	+1 Lap	8
9	(United Kingdom) Jeremy McWilliams	Honda	+1 Lap	7
10	(Switzerland) Oliver Petrucciani	Aprilia	+1 Lap	6
11	(Japan) Osamu Miyazaki	Yamaha	+1 Lap	5
12	(Spain) Eustaquio Gavira	Aprilia	+1 Lap	4
13	(Italy) Franco Battaini	Yamaha	+1 Lap	3
14	(Japan) Noriyasu Numata	Suzuki	+1 Lap	2
15	(Italy) Luca Boscoscuro	Honda	+1 Lap	1
Ret	(Spain) Idalio Gavira	Aprilia	Retirement	
Ret	(Japan) Takeshi Tsujimura	TSR-Honda	Retirement	
Ret	(Spain) Luis d'Antin	Yamaha	Retirement	
Ret	(United States) Kurtis Roberts	Aprilia	Retirement	
Ret	(Spain) José Luis Cardoso	Yamaha	Retirement	
Ret	(France) William Costes	Honda	Retirement	
Ret	(United Kingdom) Jamie Robinson	Suzuki	Retirement	
Ret	(Italy) Stefano Perugini	Aprilia	Retirement	
Ret	(Argentina) Sebastian Porto	Aprilia	Retirement	
Ret	(Italy) Loris Capirossi	Aprilia	Retirement	

== 125 cc classification ==
Pos	Rider	Manufacturer	Time/Retired	Points
1	(Italy) Valentino Rossi	Aprilia	48:09.930	25
2	(Japan) Kazuto Sakata	Aprilia	+0.994	20
3	(Japan) Noboru Ueda	Honda	+32.198	16
4	(Italy) Mirko Giansanti	Honda	+36.833	13
5	(Japan) Masaki Tokudome	Aprilia	+37.502	11
6	(Spain) Jorge Martinez	Aprilia	+46.000	10
7	(Japan) Tomomi Manako	Honda	+47.000	9
8	(Japan) Yoshiaki Katoh	Yamaha	+47.000	8
9	(France) Frederic Petit	Honda	+59.000	7
10	(Italy) Lucio Cecchinello	Honda	+1:00.000	6
11	(Czech Republic) Jaroslav Hules	Honda	+1:04.866	5
12	(Japan) Masao Azuma	Honda	+1:17.538	4
13	(Italy) Ivan Goi	Aprilia	+1:21.966	3
14	(Germany) Dirk Raudies	Honda	+1:24.784	2
15	(Spain) Josep Sarda	Honda	+1:31.435	1
16	(Italy) Gianluigi Scalvini	Honda	+1:40.017	
17	(Italy) Roberto Locatelli	Honda	+1:40.068	
18	(Germany) Manfred Geissler	Honda	+1 Lap	
19	(Spain) Angel Nieto Jr	Aprilia	+1 Lap	
20	(Malaysia) Chao Chee Hou	Yamaha	+1 Lap	
21	(Germany) Steve Jenkner	Aprilia	+1 Lap	
22	(Italy) Gino Borsoi	Yamaha	+1 Lap	
Ret	(Malaysia) Shahrol Yuzy	Honda	Retirement	
Ret	(Germany) Peter Öttl	Aprilia	Retirement	
Ret	(Spain) Enrique Maturana	Yamaha	Retirement	
Ret	(Japan) Youichi Ui	Yamaha	Retirement	
Ret	(Australia) Garry McCoy	Aprilia	Retirement	

Previous race: 1996 Australian Grand Prix	FIM Grand Prix World Championship; 1997 season	Next race: 1997 Japanese Grand Prix
Previous race: 1996 Malaysian Grand Prix	Malaysian Grand Prix	Next race: 1998 Malaysian Grand Prix
