= 1998 French motorcycle Grand Prix =

(France) 1998 French Grand Prix
Race details
- Race 5 of 14 races in the 1998 Grand Prix motorcycle racing season
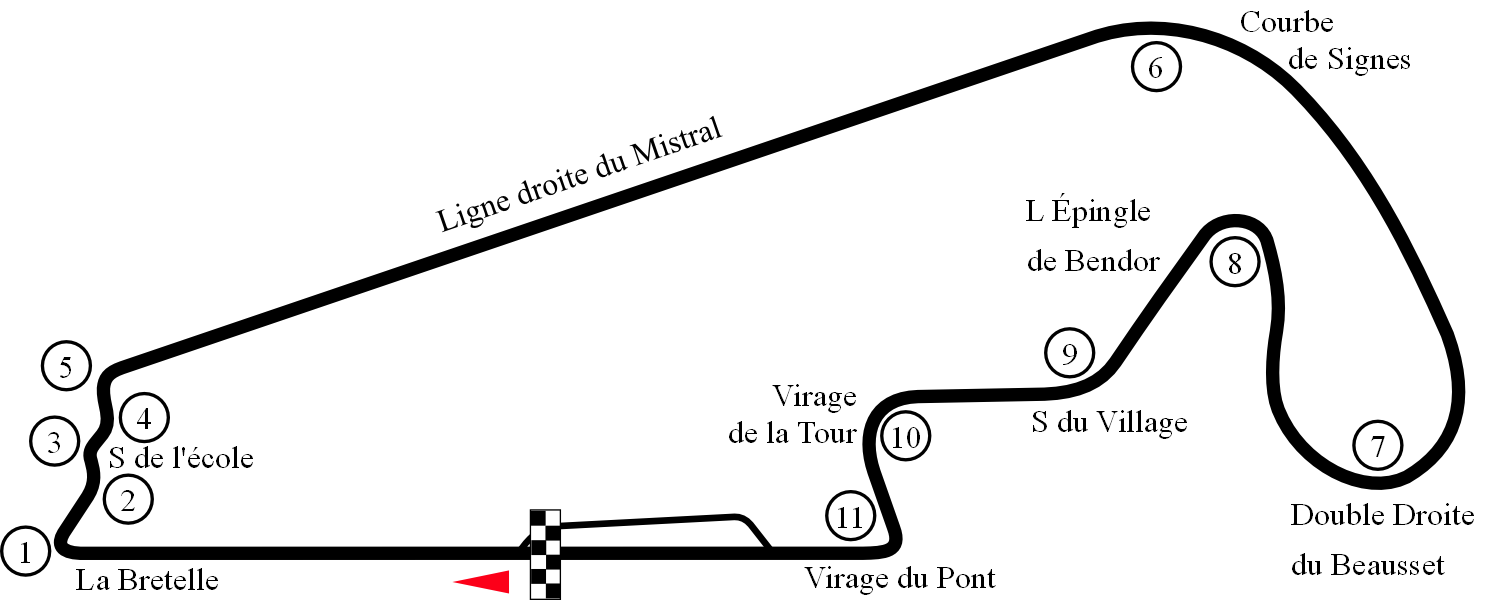
- Date: 31 May 1998
- Official name: Grand Prix de France Moto
- Location: Circuit Paul Ricard
- Course: Permanent racing facility; 3.800 km (2.361 mi)

500cc
Pole position
- Rider: (Australia) Mick Doohan
- Time: 1:21.188
Fastest lap
- Rider: (Spain) Àlex Crivillé
- Time: 1:21.736 on lap 27
Podium
- First: (Spain) Àlex Crivillé
- Second: (Australia) Mick Doohan
- Third: (Spain) Carlos Checa

250cc
Pole position
- Rider: (Japan) Tetsuya Harada
- Time: 1:23.417
Fastest lap
- Rider: (Japan) Tetsuya Harada
- Time: 1:23.688 on lap 19
Podium
- First: (Japan) Tetsuya Harada
- Second: (Italy) Valentino Rossi
- Third: (Italy) Loris Capirossi

125cc
Pole position
- Rider: (Japan) Noboru Ueda
- Time: 1:29.002
Fastest lap
- Rider: (Japan) Masao Azuma
- Time: 1:29.519 on lap 12
Podium
- First: (Japan) Kazuto Sakata
- Second: (Italy) Marco Melandri
- Third: (Japan) Masao Azuma

The 1998 French motorcycle Grand Prix was the fifth round of the 1998 Grand Prix motorcycle racing season. It took place on 31 May 1998 at Le Castellet.

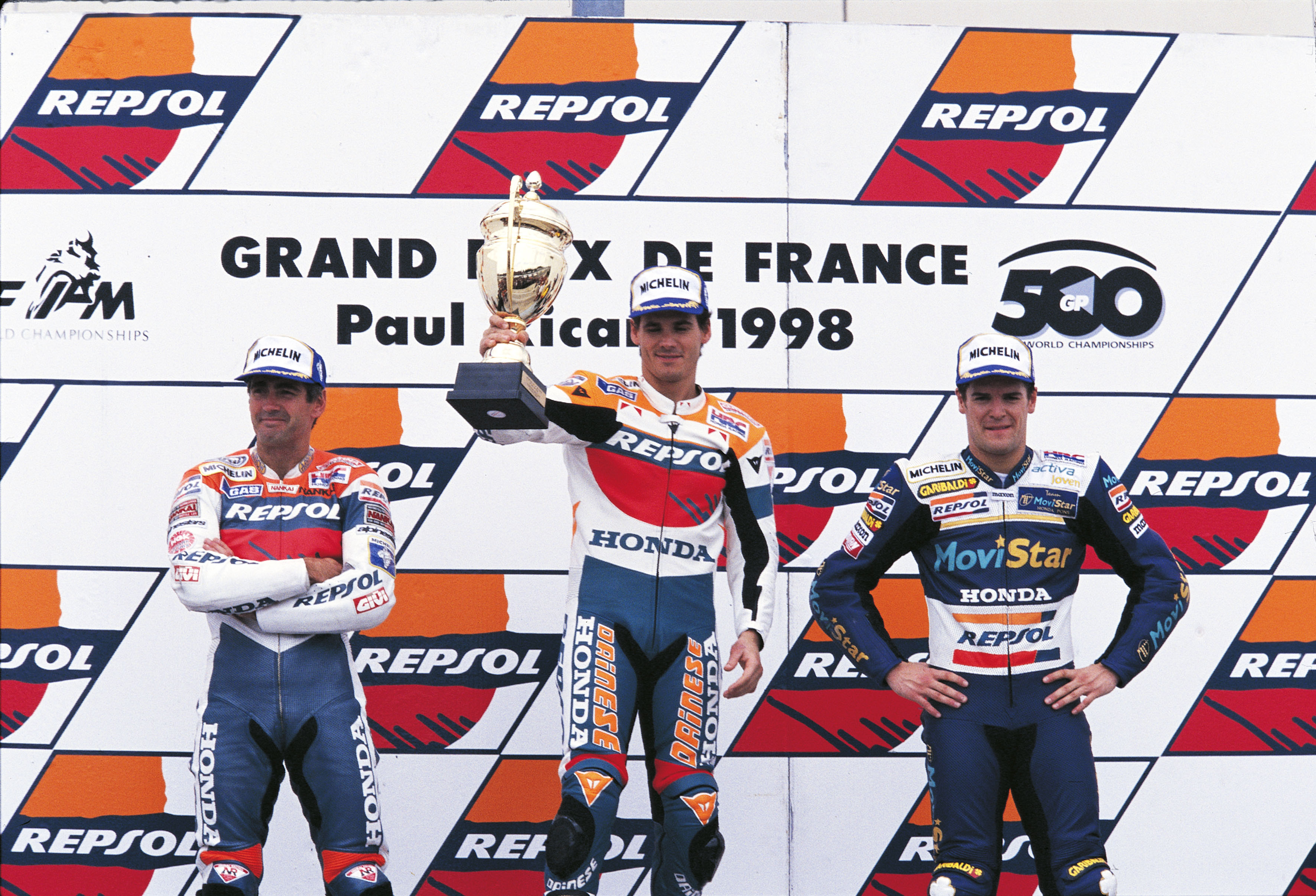
Mick Doohan, Àlex Crivillé and Carlos Checa, celebrating on the podium after finishing second, first and third in the 500cc race.

== 500 cc classification ==
Pos.	No.	Rider	Team	Manufacturer	Laps	Time/Retired	Grid	Points
1	4	(Spain) Àlex Crivillé	Repsol Honda	Honda	31	42:41.128	3	25
2	1	(Australia) Mick Doohan	Repsol Honda	Honda	31	+0.283	1	20
3	8	(Spain) Carlos Checa	Movistar Honda Pons	Honda	31	+0.498	2	16
4	19	(United States) John Kocinski	Movistar Honda Pons	Honda	31	+6.888	7	13
5	6	(Italy) Max Biaggi	Marlboro Team Kanemoto	Honda	31	+10.447	4	11
6	20	(Italy) Luca Cadalora	Yamaha Team Rainey	Yamaha	31	+16.305	6	10
7	5	(Japan) Norick Abe	Yamaha Team Rainey	Yamaha	31	+16.791	9	9
8	3	(Japan) Nobuatsu Aoki	Suzuki Grand Prix Team	Suzuki	31	+17.041	8	8
9	11	(New Zealand) Simon Crafar	Red Bull Yamaha WCM	Yamaha	31	+20.553	12	7
10	15	(Spain) Sete Gibernau	Repsol Honda	Honda	31	+23.754	11	6
11	55	(France) Régis Laconi	Red Bull Yamaha WCM	Yamaha	31	+37.553	15	5
12	28	(Germany) Ralf Waldmann	Marlboro Team Roberts	Modenas KR3	31	+43.819	13	4
13	10	(United States) Kenny Roberts, Jr.	Team Roberts	Modenas KR3	31	+48.079	10	3
14	14	(Spain) Juan Borja	Shell Advance Racing	Honda	31	+51.451	17	2
15	17	(Netherlands) Jurgen van den Goorbergh	Dee Cee Jeans Racing Team	Honda	31	+1:03.343	16	1
16	22	(France) Sébastien Gimbert	Tecmas Honda Elf	Honda	31	+1:14.072	18	
17	18	(Australia) Garry McCoy	Shell Advance Racing	Honda	31	+1:23.072	19	
18	23	(United States) Matt Wait	FCC TSR	Honda	30	+1 lap	20	
19	57	(Italy) Fabio Carpani	Team Polini Inoxmacel	Honda	30	+1 lap	22	
Ret	9	(Brazil) Alex Barros	Honda Gresini	Honda	22	Retirement	5	
Ret	88	(United Kingdom) Scott Smart	Team Millar Honda Britain	Honda	12	Retirement	21	
Ret	77	(Switzerland) Eskil Suter	MuZ Roc RennSport	MuZ	1	Accident	14	
DNS	25	(Japan) Yukio Kagayama	Suzuki Grand Prix Team	Suzuki		Did not start		

== 250 cc classification ==
Pos.	No.	Rider	Manufacturer	Laps	Time/Retired	Grid	Points
1	31	(Japan) Tetsuya Harada	Aprilia	29	40:59.018	1	25
2	46	(Italy) Valentino Rossi	Aprilia	29	+0.631	3	20
3	65	(Italy) Loris Capirossi	Aprilia	29	+14.406	2	16
4	19	(France) Olivier Jacque	Honda	29	+27.017	5	13
5	4	(Italy) Stefano Perugini	Honda	29	+28.024	11	11
6	6	(Japan) Haruchika Aoki	Honda	29	+28.045	4	10
7	9	(United Kingdom) Jeremy McWilliams	TSR-Honda	29	+36.228	9	9
8	8	(Spain) Luis d'Antin	Yamaha	29	+49.849	12	8
9	7	(Japan) Takeshi Tsujimura	Yamaha	29	+50.216	14	7
10	24	(United Kingdom) Jason Vincent	TSR-Honda	29	+51.672	13	6
11	21	(Italy) Franco Battaini	Yamaha	29	+53.376	19	5
12	11	(Germany) Jürgen Fuchs	Aprilia	29	+1:01.689	7	4
13	17	(Spain) José Luis Cardoso	Yamaha	29	+1:14.169	10	3
14	44	(Italy) Roberto Rolfo	TSR-Honda	29	+1:18.169	17	2
15	68	(France) Julien Allemand	Honda	28	+1 lap	24	1
16	14	(Italy) Davide Bulega	ERP Honda	28	+1 lap	23	
17	69	(France) Vincent Philippe	Honda	28	+1 lap	26	
18	70	(France) Franck Poulle	Honda	28	+1 lap	28	
Ret	71	(France) Hervé Mora	Aprilia	24	Retirement	27	
Ret	41	(Argentina) Federico Gartner	Aprilia	21	Retirement	25	
Ret	12	(Japan) Noriyasu Numata	Suzuki	17	Accident	18	
Ret	20	(France) William Costes	Honda	13	Accident	16	
Ret	37	(Italy) Luca Boscoscuro	TSR-Honda	11	Retirement	15	
Ret	5	(Japan) Tohru Ukawa	Honda	8	Retirement	6	
Ret	27	(Argentina) Sebastián Porto	Aprilia	5	Retirement	8	
Ret	18	(Japan) Osamu Miyazaki	Yamaha	4	Accident	21	
Ret	25	(Japan) Yasumasa Hatakeyama	ERP Honda	4	Accident	20	
Ret	16	(Sweden) Johan Stigefelt	Suzuki	1	Retirement	22	
DNS	67	(France) Matthieu Lagrive	Honda		Did not start		

== 125 cc classification ==
Pos.	No.	Rider	Manufacturer	Laps	Time/Retired	Grid	Points
1	4	(Japan) Kazuto Sakata	Aprilia	27	40:57.583	2	25
2	13	(Italy) Marco Melandri	Honda	27	+0.292	12	20
3	20	(Japan) Masao Azuma	Honda	27	+0.393	9	16
4	15	(Italy) Roberto Locatelli	Honda	27	+3.314	11	13
5	10	(Italy) Lucio Cecchinello	Honda	27	+4.057	4	11
6	9	(France) Frédéric Petit	Honda	27	+4.824	5	10
7	22	(Germany) Steve Jenkner	Aprilia	27	+10.041	8	9
8	5	(Japan) Masaki Tokudome	Aprilia	27	+14.660	18	8
9	26	(Italy) Ivan Goi	Aprilia	27	+28.373	13	7
10	62	(Japan) Yoshiaki Katoh	Yamaha	27	+32.660	23	6
11	41	(Japan) Youichi Ui	Yamaha	27	+35.533	7	5
12	21	(France) Arnaud Vincent	Aprilia	27	+35.617	10	4
13	59	(Spain) Jerónimo Vidal	Aprilia	27	+48.609	21	3
14	17	(Spain) Enrique Maturana	Yamaha	27	+51.162	20	2
15	18	(Italy) Paolo Tessari	Aprilia	27	+57.049	14	1
16	65	(Italy) Andrea Iommi	Honda	27	+1:24.700	24	
17	67	(France) Randy de Puniet	Honda	27	+1:29.236	27	
18	69	(France) Jimmy Petit	Honda	26	+1 lap	28	
Ret	7	(Spain) Emilio Alzamora	Aprilia	18	Retirement	17	
Ret	3	(Japan) Tomomi Manako	Honda	17	Retirement	3	
Ret	29	(Spain) Ángel Nieto, Jr.	Aprilia	17	Retirement	19	
Ret	32	(Italy) Mirko Giansanti	Honda	13	Accident	6	
Ret	68	(France) Nicolas Dussauge	Honda	13	Retirement	22	
Ret	16	(Italy) Christian Manna	Yamaha	11	Retirement	25	
Ret	2	(Japan) Noboru Ueda	Honda	6	Accident	1	
Ret	8	(Italy) Gianluigi Scalvini	Honda	6	Accident	16	
Ret	39	(Czech Republic) Jaroslav Huleš	Honda	5	Retirement	26	
Ret	25	(Italy) Gino Borsoi	Aprilia	2	Accident	15	

== Championship standings after the race (500cc) ==
Below are the standings for the top five riders and constructors after round five has concluded.

Riders' Championship standings

Pos.	Rider	Points
1	(Spain) Àlex Crivillé	92
2	(Australia) Mick Doohan	90
3	(Italy) Max Biaggi	88
4	(Spain) Carlos Checa	70
5	(United States) John Kocinski	43

Constructors' Championship standings

Pos.	Constructor	Points
1	(Japan) Honda	125
2	(Japan) Yamaha	55
3	(Japan) Suzuki	44
4	(Malaysia) Modenas KR3	28
5	(Germany) MuZ	4

- Note: Only the top five positions are included for both sets of standings.

Previous race: 1998 Italian Grand Prix	FIM Grand Prix World Championship; 1998 season	Next race: 1998 Madrid Grand Prix
Previous race: 1997 French Grand Prix	French Grand Prix	Next race: 1999 French Grand Prix
