= 1998 Grand Prix motorcycle racing season =

Sports season

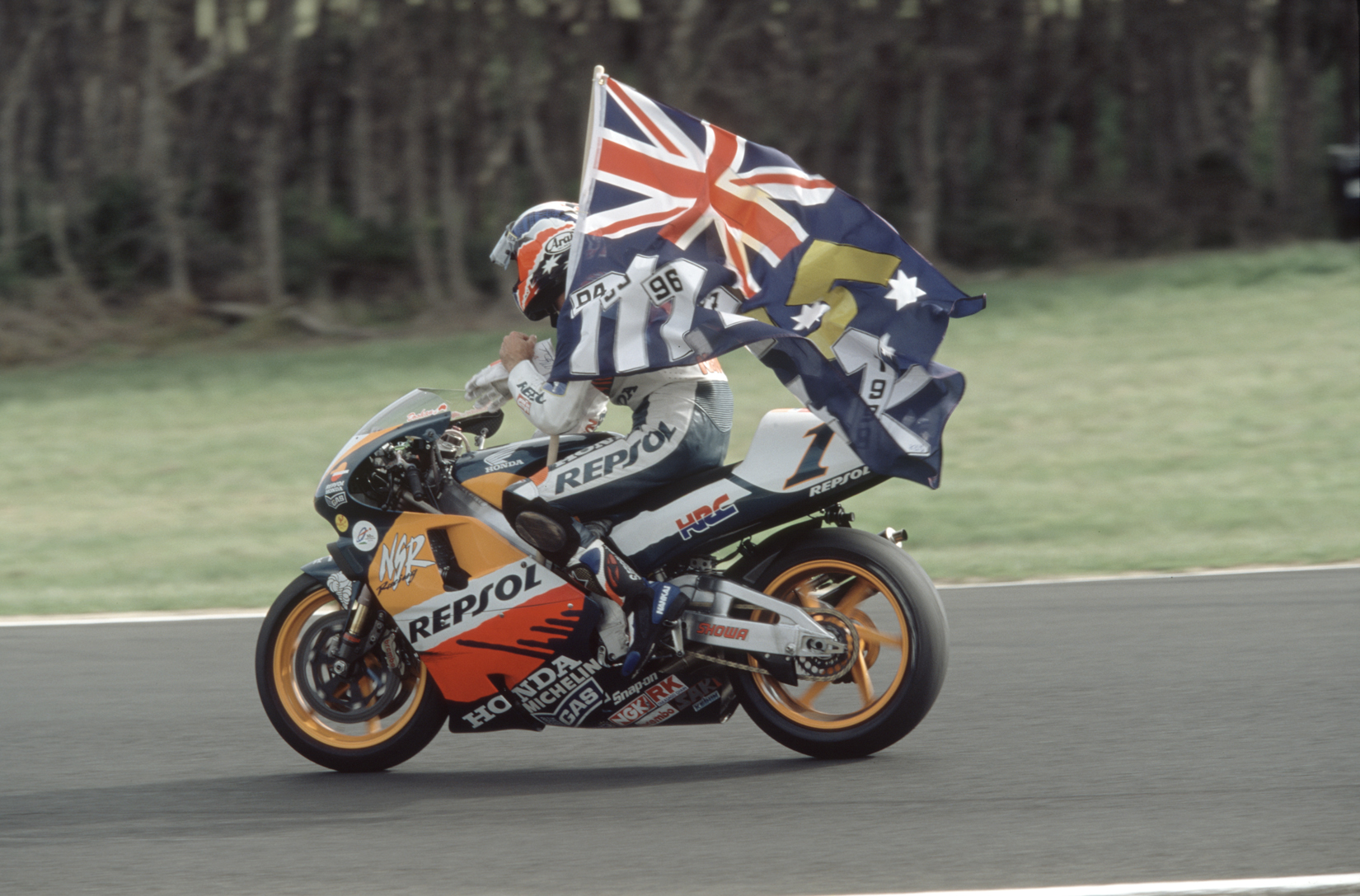
Mick Doohan (pictured at Phillip Island) became the 1998 500cc world champion

The 1998 Grand Prix motorcycle racing season was the 50th F.I.M. Road Racing World Championship season.

== Season summary ==
Mick Doohan and Honda continued to dominate the 500 class with the Australian taking 8 victories and Honda winning all but one race. Simon Crafar winning the British Grand Prix for Yamaha's lone victory. After being shocked by 500 class rookie Max Biaggi's opening round victory in the Japanese Grand Prix, Doohan went on to claim his fifth world championship in as many years, finishing off the season with four consecutive wins.

A controversial finish marked the 250 title race. Aprilia teammates Tetsuya Harada and Loris Capirossi both went into the final race in Argentina with a chance to win the title, Capirossi leading Harada by 4 points. With one corner to go, Harada was in second, with Capirossi third, which would have given Harada the championship on tiebreak. Entering the final turn, his bike was struck from behind by Capirossi's machine, sending both riders off the track. Valentino Rossi took the win with Capirossi recovering to finish in second and claiming the title. Afterwards, Aprilia would release Capirossi from his contract.

Kazuto Sakata would win his second 125 title for Aprilia after a tight battle with Tomomi Manako and Marco Melandri.

== 1998 Grand Prix season calendar ==
The following Grands Prix were scheduled to take place in 1998:

Round	Date	Grand Prix	Circuit
1	5 April	Marlboro Grand Prix of Japan	Suzuka Circuit
2	19 April	(Malaysia) Marlboro Malaysian Grand Prix	Johor Circuit
3	3 May	(Spain) Gran Premio Marlboro de España	Circuito Permanente de Jerez
4	17 May	(Italy) Gran Premio Q8 d'Italia	Mugello Circuit
5	31 May	Grand Prix de France	Circuit Paul Ricard
6	14 June	(Community of Madrid) Gran Premio Comunidad de Madrid	Circuito Permanente del Jarama
7	27 June ††	(Netherlands) Rizla Dutch TT	TT Circuit Assen
8	5 July	(United Kingdom) British Grand Prix	Donington Park
9	19 July	(Germany) Polini Motorrad Grand Prix Deutschland	Sachsenring
10	23 August	(Czech Republic) Grand Prix České republiky	Brno Circuit
11	6 September	(Bologna) Gran Premio Cirio Città di Imola	Autodromo Enzo e Dino Ferrari
12	20 September	(Catalonia) Grand Prix Marlboro de Catalunya	Circuit de Catalunya
13	4 October	(Australia) Qantas Australian Grand Prix	Phillip Island Grand Prix Circuit
14	25 October	Gran Premio Marlboro de Argentina	Autódromo Oscar Alfredo Gálvez

†† = Saturday race

=== Calendar changes ===
- The Malaysian Grand Prix and Japanese Grand Prix swapped places, with Japan hosting the opening round Grand Prix, instead of Malaysia.
- The Malaysian Grand Prix moved from the Shah Alam Circuit to the Johor Circuit.
- The German Grand Prix moved from the Nürburgring to the Sachsenring because of the very low number of spectators who came to view the race there.
- The Austrian Grand Prix was removed from the calendar, mainly because of a low number of spectators.
- The Rio Grand Prix was removed from the calendar because of organisational problems.
- The Indonesian Grand Prix was removed from the calendar because of 1997 Asian financial crisis that affected the country and was replaced by the Argentine Grand Prix.
- The Madrid Grand Prix was added as an extra, one-off Grand Prix.

== 1998 Grand Prix season results ==
Round	Date	Race	Location	125cc winner	250cc winner	500cc winner	Report
1	5 April	(Japan) Japanese motorcycle Grand Prix	Suzuka	(Japan) Kazuto Sakata	(Japan) Daijiro Kato	(Italy) Max Biaggi	Report
2	19 April	(Malaysia) Malaysian motorcycle Grand Prix	Johor	(Japan) Noboru Ueda	(Japan) Tetsuya Harada	(Australia) Mick Doohan	Report
3	3 May	(Spain) Spanish motorcycle Grand Prix	Jerez	(Japan) Kazuto Sakata	(Italy) Loris Capirossi	(Spain) Àlex Crivillé	Report
4	17 May	(Italy) Italian motorcycle Grand Prix	Mugello	(Japan) Tomomi Manako	(Italy) Marcellino Lucchi	(Australia) Mick Doohan	Report
5	31 May	(France) French motorcycle Grand Prix	Paul Ricard	(Japan) Kazuto Sakata	(Japan) Tetsuya Harada	(Spain) Àlex Crivillé	Report
6	14 June	(Community of Madrid) Madrid motorcycle Grand Prix	Jarama	(Italy) Lucio Cecchinello	(Japan) Tetsuya Harada	(Spain) Carlos Checa	Report
7	27 June ††	(Netherlands) Dutch TT	Assen	(Italy) Marco Melandri	(Italy) Valentino Rossi	(Australia) Mick Doohan	Report
8	5 July	(United Kingdom) British motorcycle Grand Prix	Donington	(Japan) Kazuto Sakata	(Italy) Loris Capirossi	(New Zealand) Simon Crafar	Report
9	19 July	(Germany) German motorcycle Grand Prix	Sachsenring	(Japan) Tomomi Manako	(Japan) Tetsuya Harada	(Australia) Mick Doohan	Report
10	23 August	Czech Republic motorcycle Grand Prix	Brno	(Italy) Marco Melandri	(Japan) Tetsuya Harada	(Italy) Max Biaggi	Report
11	6 September	(Bologna) City of Imola motorcycle Grand Prix	Imola	(Japan) Tomomi Manako	(Italy) Valentino Rossi	(Australia) Mick Doohan	Report
12	20 September	(Catalonia) Catalan motorcycle Grand Prix	Catalunya	(Japan) Tomomi Manako	(Italy) Valentino Rossi	(Australia) Mick Doohan	Report
13	4 October	(Australia) Australian motorcycle Grand Prix	Phillip Island	(Japan) Masao Azuma	(Italy) Valentino Rossi	(Australia) Mick Doohan	Report
14	25 October	(Argentina) Argentine motorcycle Grand Prix	Buenos Aires	(Japan) Tomomi Manako	(Italy) Valentino Rossi	(Australia) Mick Doohan	Report

†† = Saturday race

== Participants ==
=== 500cc participants ===
Team	Constructor	Motorcycle	No.	Rider	Rounds
(Japan) Repsol Honda	Honda	Honda NSR500	1	(Australia) Mick Doohan	All
(Japan) Repsol Honda	Honda	Honda NSR500	2	(Japan) Tadayuki Okada	1–4, 7, 10–14
(Japan) Repsol Honda	Honda	Honda NSR500	4	(Spain) Àlex Crivillé	All
(Japan) Repsol Honda	Honda	Honda NSR500V	15	(Spain) Sete Gibernau	All
(Japan) Suzuki Grand Prix Team	Suzuki	Suzuki RGV500 (XR88)	3	(Japan) Nobuatsu Aoki	All
(Japan) Suzuki Grand Prix Team	Suzuki	Suzuki RGV500 (XR88)	20	(Italy) Luca Cadalora	7
(Japan) Suzuki Grand Prix Team	Suzuki	Suzuki RGV500 (XR88)	25	(Japan) Yukio Kagayama	2–5
(Japan) Suzuki Grand Prix Team	Suzuki	Suzuki RGV500 (XR88)	27	(Japan) Katsuaki Fujiwara	10–12
(Japan) Suzuki Grand Prix Team	Suzuki	Suzuki RGV500 (XR88)	29	(Japan) Keiichi Kitagawa	1
(Japan) Suzuki Grand Prix Team	Suzuki	Suzuki RGV500 (XR88)	33	(Australia) Mark Willis	13
(Japan) / (United States) Yamaha Team Rainey	Yamaha	Yamaha YZR500 (OWK1)	5	(Japan) Norick Abe	All
(Japan) / (United States) Yamaha Team Rainey	Yamaha	Yamaha YZR500 (OWK1)	12	(France) Jean-Michel Bayle	10–12, 14
(Japan) / (United States) Yamaha Team Rainey	Yamaha	Yamaha YZR500 (OWK1)	20	(Italy) Luca Cadalora	5–6
(Japan) / (United States) Yamaha Team Rainey	Yamaha	Yamaha YZR500 (OWK1)	21	(Japan) Kyoji Nanba	1–4, 9
(Japan) Marlboro Team Kanemoto	Honda	Honda NSR500	6	(Italy) Max Biaggi	All
(Germany) / (France) / (Malaysia); MuZ Roc RennSport	MuZ	MuZ 500	7	(Italy) Doriano Romboni	1–2
(Germany) / (France) / (Malaysia); MuZ Roc RennSport	MuZ	MuZ 500	16	(France) Jean-Philippe Ruggia	7
(Germany) / (France) / (Malaysia); MuZ Roc RennSport	MuZ	MuZ 500	20	(Italy) Luca Cadalora	14
(Germany) / (France) / (Malaysia); MuZ Roc RennSport	MuZ	MuZ 500	77	(Switzerland) Eskil Suter	4–6, 8–12
(Spain) Movistar Honda Pons	Honda	Honda NSR500	8	(Spain) Carlos Checa	1–8, 10–14
(Spain) Movistar Honda Pons	Honda	Honda NSR500	14	(Spain) Juan Borja	8
(Spain) Movistar Honda Pons	Honda	Honda NSR500	19	(United States) John Kocinski	1–7, 10–14
(Spain) Movistar Honda Pons	Honda	Honda NSR500	39	(Spain) Gregorio Lavilla	9
(Italy) Honda Gresini	Honda	Honda NSR500	9	(Brazil) Alex Barros	All
(Malaysia) / (United States) Team Roberts; Marlboro Team Roberts	Modenas KR	Modenas KR3	10	(United States) Kenny Roberts Jr.	All
(Malaysia) / (United States) Team Roberts; Marlboro Team Roberts	Modenas KR	Modenas KR3	28	(Germany) Ralf Waldmann	1–7, 9–14
(United Kingdom) Red Bull Yamaha WCM	Yamaha	Yamaha YZR500	11	(New Zealand) Simon Crafar	All
(United Kingdom) Red Bull Yamaha WCM	Yamaha	Yamaha YZR500	55	(France) Régis Laconi	1, 3–14
(Australia) Shell Advance Racing	Honda	Honda NSR500V	14	(Spain) Juan Borja	1–7, 10–14
(Australia) Shell Advance Racing	Honda	Honda NSR500V	18	(Australia) Garry McCoy	1–10, 13
(Australia) Shell Advance Racing	Honda	Honda NSR500V	26	(France) Bernard Garcia	11
(Australia) Shell Advance Racing	Honda	Honda NSR500V	42	(Australia) Craig Connell	12, 14
(Australia) Shell Advance Racing	Honda	Honda NSR500V	42	(Australia) Craig Connell	13
(Australia) Shell Advance Racing	Honda	Honda NSR500V	53	(South Africa) Russel Wood	2
(Australia) Shell Advance Racing	Honda	Honda NSR500V	58	(Portugal) Felisberto Teixeira	3
(Australia) Shell Advance Racing	Honda	Honda NSR500V	71	(Argentina) Juan Pablo Gianini	14
(Australia) Shell Advance Racing	Honda	Honda NSR500V	72	(Spain) Fernando Cristóbal	6
(Australia) Shell Advance Racing	Honda	Honda NSR500V	72	(Spain) Fernando Cristóbal	8–9
(Netherlands) Dee Cee Jeans Racing Team	Honda	Honda NSR500V	17	(Netherlands) Jurgen van den Goorbergh	All
(France) Tecmas Honda Elf	Honda	Honda NSR500V	22	(France) Sébastien Gimbert	1–6, 10–14
(France) Tecmas Honda Elf	Honda	Honda NSR500V	26	(France) Bernard Garcia	7–9
(Japan) F.C.C. TSR	Honda	Honda NSR500V	23	(United States) Matt Wait	All
(Italy) Team Paton	Paton	Paton V70 C10/4	43	(Italy) Paolo Tessari	11–12
(Italy) Team Paton	Paton	Paton V70 C10/4	63	(Italy) Gianmaria Liverani	4
(Japan) Yamaha Racing Team	Yamaha	Yamaha YZR500	50	(Japan) Noriyuki Haga	1
(Japan) BP Yamaha Racing Team	Yamaha	Yamaha YZR500	52	(Japan) Norihiko Fujiwara	2
(Italy) Team Polini Inoxmacel	Honda	Honda NSR500V	57	(Italy) Fabio Carpani	All
(Germany) Team Zupin	Honda	Honda NSR500V	60	(Germany) Jörg Schöllhorn	9
(United Kingdom) Team Vimto Honda/Paul Bird	Honda	Honda NSR500V	68	(United Kingdom) John McGuinness	8
(United Kingdom) Team Millar Honda Britain	Honda	Honda NSR500V	88	(United Kingdom) Scott Smart	1, 3–14

Key
Regular Rider
Wildcard Rider
Replacement Rider

=== 250cc participants ===
Team	Constructor	Motorcycle	No	Rider	Rounds
(Italy) Castrol 250 Team	Honda	Honda NSR250	4	(Italy) Stefano Perugini	All
(Italy) Benetton Honda	Honda	Honda NSR250	5	(Japan) Tohru Ukawa	All
(Japan) F.C.C. TSR	Honda	Honda NSR250	6	(Japan) Haruchika Aoki	All
(Italy) Team Semprucci Biesse Group	Yamaha	Yamaha YZR 250	7	(Japan) Takeshi Tsujimura	All
(Spain) Antena 3 Yamaha	Yamaha	Yamaha YZR 250	8	(Spain) Luis D'Antin	All
(Spain) Antena 3 Yamaha	Yamaha	Yamaha YZR 250	17	(Spain) José Luis Cardoso	All
(Spain) Antena 3 Yamaha	Yamaha	Yamaha YZR 250	92	(Spain) David García	12
(United Kingdom) QUB Team Optimum	TSR–Honda	Honda NSR250	9	(United Kingdom) Jeremy McWilliams	All
(Germany) Docshop Racing	Aprilia	Aprilia RSV 250	11	(Germany) Jürgen Fuchs	1–9
(Germany) Docshop Racing	Aprilia	Aprilia RSV 250	15	(Australia) Martin Craggill	13
(Germany) Docshop Racing	Aprilia	Aprilia RSV 250	34	(Italy) Marcellino Lucchi	10–11
(Germany) Docshop Racing	Aprilia	Aprilia RSV 250	45	(Italy) Diego Giugovaz	12, 14
(Germany) Docshop Racing	Aprilia	Aprilia RSV 250	85	(Germany) Mathias Neukirchen	9
(Japan) Team Rizla Suzuki	Suzuki	Suzuki RGV250	12	(Japan) Noriyasu Numata	All
(Japan) Team Rizla Suzuki	Suzuki	Suzuki RGV250	16	(Sweden) Johan Stigefelt	All
(Italy) OXS Matteoni Racing	ERP Honda	Honda NSR250	14	(Italy) Davide Bulega	5–14
(Italy) OXS Matteoni Racing	Honda	Honda NSR250	14	(Italy) Davide Bulega	1–4
(Italy) OXS Matteoni Racing	Honda	Honda NSR250	49	(Italy) Filippo Cotti	11
(Germany) Edo Racing	Yamaha	Yamaha YZR 250	18	(Japan) Osamu Miyazaki	1–5, 7, 10–14
(Germany) Edo Racing	Yamaha	Yamaha YZR 250	21	(Italy) Franco Battaini	1–6, 10–14
(Germany) Edo Racing	Yamaha	Yamaha YZR 250	33	(United Kingdom) Jamie Robinson	8–9
(Germany) Edo Racing	Yamaha	Yamaha YZR 250	47	(Italy) Ivan Clementi	6–9
(France) Chesterfield Elf Tech 3	Honda	Honda NSR250	19	(France) Olivier Jacque	1–7, 10–14
(France) Chesterfield Elf Tech 3	Honda	Honda NSR250	20	(France) William Costes	1–9
(France) Chesterfield Elf Tech 3	Honda	Honda NSR250	22	(France) Matthieu Lagrive	10–14
(France) Chesterfield Elf Tech 3	Honda	Honda NSR250	68	(France) Julien Allemand	8–9
(United Kingdom) Padgetts HRC Shop	TSR–Honda	Honda NSR250	24	(United Kingdom) Jason Vincent	1–13
(United Kingdom) Padgetts HRC Shop	Honda	Honda NSR250	82	(United Kingdom) Woolsey Coulter	8
(United Kingdom) Padgetts HRC Shop	Honda	Honda NSR250	82	(United Kingdom) Woolsey Coulter	14
(Japan) Penguin Racing	ERP–Honda	Honda NSR250	25	(Japan) Yasumasa Hatakeyama	4–9
(Japan) Penguin Racing	Honda	Honda NSR250	25	(Japan) Yasumasa Hatakeyama	1–3, 10–14
(Spain) PR2 Mitsubishi Elaion	Aprilia	Aprilia RSV 250	27	(Argentina) Sebastián Porto	All
(Spain) PR2 Mitsubishi Elaion	Aprilia	Aprilia RSV 250	40	(United Kingdom) Gary May	8
(Spain) PR2 Mitsubishi Elaion	Aprilia	Aprilia RSV 250	41	(Argentina) Federico Gartner	1–7, 9–14
(Italy) Aprilia Grand Prix Racing Team	Aprilia	Aprilia RSV 250	31	(Japan) Tetsuya Harada	All
(Italy) Aprilia Grand Prix Racing Team	Aprilia	Aprilia RSV 250	34	(Italy) Marcellino Lucchi	3–4, 12
(Italy) Aprilia Grand Prix Racing Team	Aprilia	Aprilia RSV 250	65	(Italy) Loris Capirossi	All
(Italy) Scuderia AGV Carrizosa	TSR–Honda	Honda NSR250	37	(Italy) Luca Boscoscuro	All
(Italy) Scuderia AGV Carrizosa	TSR–Honda	Honda NSR250	44	(Italy) Roberto Rolfo	All
(Australia) Strugnell Racing	Yamaha	Yamaha YZR 250	42	(Australia) William Strugnell	13
(Australia) Team Taylor Racing	Honda	Honda NSR250	43	(Australia) David Horton	13
(Italy) Team Italia	Aprilia	Aprilia RSV 250	45	(Italy) Diego Giugovaz	11
(Italy) Nastro Azzurro Aprilia	Aprilia	Aprilia RSV 250	46	(Italy) Valentino Rossi	All
(Italy) Team RCGM	Aprilia	Aprilia RSV 250	48	(Italy) Igor Antonelli	11
(Japan) BP Yamaha Racing Team	Yamaha	Yamaha YZR 250	50	(Japan) Shinya Nakano	1, 13
(Japan) Y.E.S.S. Racing Team	Yamaha	Yamaha YZR 250	51	(Japan) Naoki Matsudo	1
Team Suzuki All Japan	Suzuki	Suzuki RGV250	52	(Japan) Choujun Kameya	1
Team Suzuki All Japan	Suzuki	Suzuki RGV250	55	(Japan) Yukio Kagayama	1
(Japan) Team Kotake	Honda	Honda NSR250	53	(Japan) Makoto Tamada	1
(Japan) Castrol Honda	Honda	Honda NSR250	54	(Japan) Daijiro Kato	1
(Malaysia) Petronas Sprinta Team TVK	Honda	Honda NSR250	56	(Malaysia) Shahrol Yuzy	2
(Spain) SBK Sport	Honda	Honda NSR250	58	(Spain) Eustaquio Gavira	3, 12
(Spain) SBK Sport	Honda	Honda NSR250	59	(Spain) Ismael Bonilla	3, 6
(Spain) SBK Sport	Honda	Honda NSR250	60	(Spain) Agustín Escobar	3
(Spain) Equipo Competition M-3	Yamaha	Yamaha YZR 250	61	(Spain) Manuel Luque	3
(Australia) Brunskill Racing	Yamaha	Yamaha YZR 250	62	(Australia) Adam Brunskill	13
(New Zealand) Allect Racing	Honda	Honda NSR250	63	(New Zealand) Craig Frederickson	13
(Australia) Rgv Spares	Yamaha	Yamaha YZR 250	64	(Australia) Shaun Geronimi	13
(Germany) Racing Factory	Honda	Honda NSR250	66	(Germany) Alex Hofmann	9
Equipe de France	Honda	Honda NSR250	67	(France) Matthieu Lagrive	5
Equipe de France	Honda	Honda NSR250	68	(France) Julien Allemand	5
Equipe de France	Honda	Honda NSR250	69	(France) Vincent Philippe	5
(France) F.P. Racing	Honda	Honda NSR250	70	(France) Franck Poulle	5
Aprilia France	Aprilia	Aprilia RSV 250	71	(France) Hervé Mora	5
(Spain) Team Sotano	Yamaha	Yamaha YZR 250	72	(Spain) José David de Gea	6
(Spain) Hernandez Team	Honda	Honda NSR250	73	(Spain) Alex Debón	6
(Spain) Team Chupa Chups	Honda	Honda NSR250	74	(Spain) Lucas Oliver Bultó	12
(Spain) Team Chupa Chups	Honda	Honda NSR250	93	(Spain) Iván Silva	12
(Netherlands) MRTT Team Bolwerk	Honda	Honda NSR250	75	(Netherlands) Maurice Bolwerk	7
(Netherlands) Dee Cee Jeans Racing Team	Honda	Honda NSR250	76	(Netherlands) Jarno Janssen	7
(Netherlands) Racing Team Twello	Honda	Honda NSR250	77	(Netherlands) André Romein	7
(Netherlands) Johan Jong Brandbom Team	Honda	Honda NSR250	78	(Netherlands) Rudie Markink	7
(Netherlands) Schoenkaper O.Z.	Honda	Honda NSR250	79	(Netherlands) Henk van der Lagemaat	7
(United Kingdom) Aprilia UK / Blacks Bikeshop	Aprilia	Aprilia RSV 250	80	(United Kingdom) Paul Jones	8
(United Kingdom) Honda Britain / QUB Team Optimum	Honda	Honda NSR250	81	(United Kingdom) Callum Ramsay	8
(United Kingdom) Team Colin Appleyard Racing	Honda	Honda NSR250	83	(South Africa) Shane Norval	8
(Germany) Team Klingels	Honda	Honda NSR250	84	(Germany) Mike Baldinger	9
(Germany) RS Rallye Sport Gmbh	Honda	Honda NSR250	86	(Germany) Markus Ober	9
(Germany) Imt Racing Team	Honda	Honda NSR250	87	(Germany) Adrian Schmidt	9
(Slovakia) Slovnaft Sport Moto Team	ERP–Honda	Honda NSR250	88	(Slovakia) Vladimír Častka	10
(Czech Republic) Klub Racing Team Znojmo	Yamaha	Yamaha YZR 250	89	(Czech Republic) Radomil Rous	10
(Czech Republic) Moto Racing Club Ostrava	Honda	Honda NSR250	90	(Czech Republic) Lukáš Vavrečka	10
(Germany) Muller Maler Racing Team	Yamaha	Yamaha YZR 250	91	(Germany) Lars Langer	10
(Spain) Costa Azamar	Honda	Honda NSR250	94	(Spain) David Ortega	12
(Argentina) Mitsubishi Mondial	Yamaha	Yamaha YZR 250	95	(Argentina) Matías Ríos	14
(Argentina) Pablo Lessio Competicion	Yamaha	Yamaha YZR 250	96	(Argentina) Leandro Mulet	14
(Argentina) Honda Castrol Gregorio	Honda	Honda NSR250	97	(Argentina) Diego Ruabén	14
(Argentina) Recouso Oscar	Yamaha	Yamaha YZR 250	98	(Argentina) Gabriel Borgmann	14

Key
Regular Rider
Wildcard Rider
Replacement Rider

=== 125cc participants ===
Team	Constructor	Motorcycle	No	Rider	Rounds
(Monaco) Givi Honda LCR	Honda	Honda RS125R	2	(Japan) Noboru Ueda	1–5, 12–14
(Monaco) Givi Honda LCR	Honda	Honda RS125R	10	(Italy) Lucio Cecchinello	All
(Monaco) Givi Honda LCR	Honda	Honda RS125R	52	(Japan) Hiroyuki Kikuchi	6–10
(Germany) Team UGT 3000	Honda	Honda RS125R	3	(Japan) Tomomi Manako	All
(Germany) Team UGT 3000	Honda	Honda RS125R	39	(Czech Republic) Jaroslav Huleš	All
(Germany) UGT 3000	Aprilia	Aprilia RS125R	4	(Japan) Kazuto Sakata	All
(Germany) UGT 3000	Honda	Honda RS125R	9	(France) Frédéric Petit	All
(Germany) UGT 3000	Honda	Honda RS125R	85	(Germany) Klaus Nöhles	9
(Germany) Docshop Racing	Aprilia	Aprilia RS125R	5	(Japan) Masaki Tokudome	All
(Spain) Via Digital Team	Aprilia	Aprilia RS125R	7	(Spain) Emilio Alzamora	All
(Spain) Via Digital Team	Aprilia	Aprilia RS125R	29	(Spain) Ángel Nieto Jr.	All
(Spain) Via Digital Team	Aprilia	Aprilia RS125R	60	(Spain) Fonsi Nieto	3, 6, 12
(Spain) Via Digital Team	Aprilia	Aprilia RS125R	79	(Spain) Pablo Nieto	12
(Italy) Team Polini Inoxmacel	Honda	Honda RS125R	8	(Italy) Gianluigi Scalvini	All
(Italy) Team Polini Inoxmacel	Honda	Honda RS125R	15	(Italy) Roberto Locatelli	All
(Italy) Team Polini Inoxmacel	Honda	Honda RS125R	49	(Italy) Andrea Zappa	11
(Italy) Team Polini Inoxmacel	Honda	Honda RS125R	70	(Spain) Adrián Araujo	12
(Spain) Team Valencia Aspar	Aprilia	Aprilia RS125R	11	(Spain) Jose Ramon Ramirez	1–3
(Spain) Team Valencia Aspar	Aprilia	Aprilia RS125R	59	(Spain) Jerónimo Vidal	3
(Spain) Team Valencia Aspar	Aprilia	Aprilia RS125R	59	(Spain) Jerónimo Vidal	4–11, 13–14
(Spain) Team Valencia Aspar	Aprilia	Aprilia RS125R	73	(Spain) Iván Martínez	6
(Spain) Team Valencia Aspar	Aprilia	Aprilia RS125R	73	(Spain) Iván Martínez	12
(Italy) Benetton Matteoni; OXS Matteoni	Honda	Honda RS125R	13	(Italy) Marco Melandri	All
(Italy) Benetton Matteoni; OXS Matteoni	Honda	Honda RS125R	32	(Italy) Mirko Giansanti	All
(Italy) Benetton Matteoni; OXS Matteoni	Honda	Honda RS125R	55	(San Marino) Manuel Poggiali	11
(Italy) Scuderia Alfa Nolan	Aprilia	Aprilia RS125R	14	(Italy) Federico Cerroni	6–12, 14
(Italy) Scuderia Alfa Nolan	Aprilia	Aprilia RS125R	18	(Italy) Paolo Tessari	1–5
(Italy) Scuderia Alfa Nolan	Aprilia	Aprilia RS125R	24	(Italy) Alessandro Romagnoli	13
(Italy) Team Semprucci Biesse Group	Yamaha	Yamaha TZ125	16	(Italy) Christian Manna	1–11, 14
(Italy) Team Semprucci Biesse Group	Yamaha	Yamaha TZ125	19	(Italy) Andrea Ballerini	12–13
(Italy) Team Semprucci Biesse Group	Yamaha	Yamaha TZ125	62	(Japan) Yoshiaki Katoh	All
(Germany) Team Yamaha Kurz Aral	Yamaha	Yamaha TZ125	17	(Spain) Juan Enrique Maturana	All
(Germany) Team Yamaha Kurz Aral	Yamaha	Yamaha TZ125	41	(Japan) Youichi Ui	All
(Italy) Team Pileri	Honda	Honda RS125R	19	(Italy) Andrea Ballerini	1–3
(Italy) Team Pileri	Honda	Honda RS125R	65	(Italy) Andrea Iommi	4–14
(Japan) Mac Motors Liegeois Competicion	Honda	Honda RS125R	20	(Japan) Masao Azuma	All
(France) SCRAB Compétition	Aprilia	Aprilia RS125R	21	(France) Arnaud Vincent	All
(Germany) Marlboro Team ADAC	Aprilia	Aprilia RS125R	22	(Germany) Steve Jenkner	All
(Italy) Motoracing Team	Aprilia	Aprilia RS125R	23	(Italy) Gino Borsoi	All
(Italy) Vasco Rossi Racing	Aprilia	Aprilia RS125R	26	(Italy) Ivan Goi	All
(Australia) Fairbarin Cranes–Black Mamba	Honda	Honda RS125R	42	(Australia) Chedryian Bresland	13
(Australia) Teknic Motorcycle Clothing	Honda	Honda RS125R	43	(Australia) Peter Galvin	13
(Australia) Southern Cross Sports	Honda	Honda RS125R	44	(Australia) Judd Greedy	13
(Australia) Team Taylor Racing	Honda	Honda RS125R	45	(Australia) Jay Taylor	13
(Australia) Christopher West Plumbing	Honda	Honda RS125R	46	(Australia) Anthony West	13
(Italy) Team Italia	Aprilia	Aprilia RS125R	47	(Italy) Riccardo Chiarello	11
(Italy) Team RS	Honda	Honda RS125R	48	(Italy) Max Sabbatani	11
(Japan) M'Project	Honda	Honda RS125R	50	(Japan) Yuzo Fujioka	1
(Japan) J. Racing	Yamaha	Yamaha TZ125	51	(Japan) Takashi Akita	1
(Japan) Tube Riders & Ablecom	Honda	Honda RS125R	52	(Japan) Hiroyuki Kikuchi	1
(Japan) S.P. Tadao Racing Team	Yamaha	Yamaha TZ125	53	(Japan) Nobuyuki Osaki	1
(Japan) Castrol Team Harc Pro	Honda	Honda RS125R	54	(Japan) Kazuhiro Takao	1
(Malaysia) RRC Prakash RAO	Honda	Honda RS125R	56	(Malaysia) Magilai Meganathan	2
(Spain) Echo Team Berner	Honda	Honda RS125R	58	(Spain) Álvaro Molina	3, 6, 12
(Spain) Team Esparragoso IGM	Yamaha	Yamaha TZ125	61	(Spain) Vicente Esparragoso	3
(Italy) Ricci Corse	Honda	Honda RS125R	63	(Italy) Marco Tresoldi	4, 11
(Italy) Ciarom–MotoSprint	Aprilia	Aprilia RS125R	64	(Italy) Claudio Cipriani	4
Honda France	Honda	Honda RS125R	67	(France) Randy de Puniet	5
(France) Ipone Dussauge Racing	Honda	Honda RS125R	68	(France) Nicolas Dussauge	5
(France) Team RMS	Honda	Honda RS125R	69	(France) Jimmy Petit	5
(Spain) Team TMR	Honda	Honda RS125R	71	(Spain) Josep Sardà	6, 12
(Spain) Team TJT	Honda	Honda RS125R	72	(Spain) Sebastián Perelló	6
(Netherlands) Ep Bos Electro Elburg	EGA Honda	Honda RS125R	74	(Netherlands) Hans Koopman	7
(Netherlands) Team Kroegman	Yamaha	Yamaha TZ125	75	(Netherlands) Wim Kroegman	7
(Netherlands) Le Coq Fight Racing	Honda	Honda RS125R	76	(Netherlands) Harold de Haan	7
(Netherlands) R.T.D. Dooderman Dakdekkers	Honda	Honda RS125R	77	(Netherlands) Ronnie Timmer	7
(Netherlands) Luvro Ramaker Toyota Racing	Honda	Honda RS125R	78	(Netherlands) Wilhelm van Leeuwen	7
(United Kingdom) Honda Britain	Honda	Honda RS125R	80	(United Kingdom) Leon Haslam	8
(United Kingdom) L Rumney/Garstang Cleaning	Honda	Honda RS125R	81	(United Kingdom) Chris Palmer	8
(United Kingdom) Racing Lines/Clive Horton	Honda	Honda RS125R	82	(United Kingdom) John Pearson	8
(United Kingdom) Ulster Racing	Honda	Honda RS125R	83	(United Kingdom) David Mateer	8
(Germany) Agip Esch Racing	Honda	Honda RS125R	84	(Germany) Reinhard Stolz	9
(Germany) Yamaha Loffler Racing Team	Yamaha	Yamaha TZ125	86	(Germany) Oliver Perschke	9
(Germany) Hein Gericke Castrol Jr Team	Honda	Honda RS125R	87	(Germany) Dirk Heidolf	9
(Germany) Motorrad B.U.S. Levior Racing	Yamaha	Yamaha TZ125	88	(Germany) Maik Stief	9
(Czech Republic) Repsol Team	Honda	Honda RS125R	89	(Czech Republic) Igor Kaláb	10
(Czech Republic) Wernberger - Team Hanusch	Honda	Honda RS125R	90	(Czech Republic) Jakub Smrž	10
(Czech Republic) Wernberger - Team Hanusch	Honda	Honda RS125R	91	(Slovakia) Martin Psotný	10
(Czech Republic) Delta Uamk Team	Honda	Honda RS125R	92	(Czech Republic) Michal Březina	10
(Czech Republic) Telemark Racing Team	Honda	Honda RS125R	93	(Czech Republic) Bohuslav Seifert	10
(Brazil) Matsuo Daido Yuasa–tam	Honda	Honda RS125R	94	(Brazil) Cristiano Vieira	14
(Brazil) Amauri–Revista Moto!	Honda	Honda RS125R	95	(Brazil) César Barros	14
(Brazil) Motosistem 1	Honda	Honda RS125R	97	(Brazil) Silvio Cesar	14

Key
Regular Rider
Wildcard Rider
Replacement Rider

== Standings ==
=== Riders' standings ===
==== 500cc ====
Scoring system

Points were awarded to the top fifteen finishers. A rider had to finish the race to earn points.

Position	**1st**	**2nd**	**3rd**	**4th**	**5th**	**6th**	**7th**	**8th**	**9th**	**10th**	**11th**	**12th**	**13th**	**14th**	**15th**
Points	25	20	16	13	11	10	9	8	7	6	5	4	3	2	1

- Riders marked with light blue background were eligible for Rookie of the Year award.

Pos	Rider	Bike	JPN (Japan)	MAL (Malaysia)	ESP (Spain)	ITA (Italy)	FRA (France)	MAD (Community of Madrid)	NED (Netherlands)	GBR (United Kingdom)	GER (Germany)	CZE (Czech Republic)	IMO (Bologna)	CAT (Catalonia)	AUS (Australia)	ARG (Argentina)	Pts
1	(Australia) Mick Doohan	Honda	Ret	**1**	2	**1**	**2**	**Ret**	**1**	2	1	**Ret**	1	1	**1**	**1**	260
2	(Italy) Max Biaggi	Honda	**1**	3	3	2	5	6	2	6	**2**	1	3	DSQ	8	5	208
3	(Spain) Àlex Crivillé	Honda	4	4	1	3	1	5	6	4	3	2	2	**Ret**	3	Ret	198
4	(Spain) Carlos Checa	Honda	8	2	**4**	4	3	1	5	WD		7	10	6	DNS	8	139
5	(Brazil) Alex Barros	Honda	7	Ret	5	9	Ret	9	4	5	4	3	4	7	4	3	138
6	(Japan) Norifumi Abe	Yamaha	14	Ret	6	6	7	2	Ret	3	Ret	5	6	3	5	4	128
7	(New Zealand) Simon Crafar	Yamaha	9	Ret	13	7	9	8	3	**1**	Ret	11	11	5	2	13	119
8	(Japan) Tadayuki Okada	Honda	2	Ret	7	DNQ			8			4	7	2	9	2	106
9	(Japan) Nobuatsu Aoki	Suzuki	6	Ret	8	8	8	4	7	7	10	12	9	11	6	12	101
10	(France) Régis Laconi	Yamaha	DNS		14	10	11	7	9	8	5	9	12	8	7	6	86
11	(Spain) Sete Gibernau	Honda	10	Ret	12	14	10	3	Ret	Ret	Ret	6	8	4	Ret	9	72
12	(United States) John Kocinski	Honda	13	5	11	5	4	Ret	DNS			15	13	9	12	10	64
13	(United States) Kenny Roberts Jr.	Modenas KR3	11	11	9	Ret	13	WD	12	Ret	6	10	14	10	10	11	59
14	(Germany) Ralf Waldmann	Modenas KR3	Ret	9	10	11	12	10	DNS		7	13	15	12	Ret	15	46
15	(Netherlands) Jurgen van den Goorbergh	Honda	Ret	8	18	16	15	Ret	10	9	8	16	Ret	13	11	14	40
16	(France) Jean-Michel Bayle	Yamaha										8	**5**	Ret		7	28
17	(Australia) Garry McCoy	Honda	Ret	10	15	13	17	11	11	13	Ret	DNS			Ret		23
18	(Japan) Kyoji Nanba	Yamaha	5	Ret	16	12					9						22
19	(United States) Matt Wait	Honda	Ret	12	20	Ret	18	13	13	Ret	14	20	18	14	13	17	17
20	(Japan) Noriyuki Haga	Yamaha	3														16
21	(United Kingdom) Scott Smart	Honda	Ret		21	19	Ret	12	14	10	Ret	21	Ret	15	15	DNS	14
22	(Japan) Yukio Kagayama	Suzuki		6	19	17	DNS										10
23	(Italy) Luca Cadalora	Yamaha					6	Ret									10
23	(Italy) Luca Cadalora	Suzuki							Ret								10
23	(Italy) Luca Cadalora	MuZ														Ret	10
24	(France) Bernard Garcia	Honda							15	11	12		Ret				10
25	(Japan) Norihiko Fujiwara	Yamaha		7													9
26	(Switzerland) Eskil Suter	MuZ				18	Ret	14		Ret	13	14	Ret	Ret			7
27	(Spain) Gregorio Lavilla	Honda									11						5
28	(Italy) Doriano Romboni	MuZ	12	DNS													4
29	(United Kingdom) John McGuinness	Honda								12							4
30	(France) Sébastien Gimbert	Honda	Ret	13	17	15	16	DNQ				19	Ret	Ret	Ret	16	4
31	(Spain) Fernando Cristóbal	Honda						15		14	15						4
32	(Spain) Juan Borja	Honda	15	Ret	Ret	Ret	14	Ret	Ret	DNS		17	17	Ret	16	18	3
33	(Australia) Mark Willis	Suzuki													14		2
34	(Italy) Fabio Carpani	Honda	16	Ret	Ret	20	19	16	DNQ	15	16	Ret	19	Ret	Ret	20	1
	(Japan) Katsuaki Fujiwara	Suzuki										18	16	Ret			0
	(Italy) Paolo Tessari	Paton											Ret	16			0
	(Australia) Craig Connell	Honda												Ret	Ret	19	0
	(Argentina) Juan Pablo Gianini	Honda														21	0
	(Portugal) Felisberto Teixeira	Honda			22												0
	(Japan) Keiichi Kitagawa	Suzuki	Ret														0
	(South Africa) Russell Wood	Honda		Ret													0
	(Italy) Gianmaria Liverani	Paton				Ret											0
	(France) Jean-Philippe Ruggia	MuZ							Ret								0
	(Germany) Jörg Schöllhorn	Honda									WD						0
Pos.	Rider	Bike	JPN (Japan)	MAL (Malaysia)	ESP (Spain)	ITA (Italy)	FRA (France)	MAD (Community of Madrid)	NED (Netherlands)	GBR (United Kingdom)	GER (Germany)	CZE (Czech Republic)	IMO (Bologna)	CAT (Catalonia)	AUS (Australia)	ARG (Argentina)	Pts

Colour	Result
Gold	Winner
Silver	Second place
Bronze	Third place
Green	Points classification
Blue	Non-points classification
Blue	Non-classified finish (NC)
Purple	Retired, not classified (Ret)
Red	Did not qualify (DNQ)
Red	Did not pre-qualify (DNPQ)
Black	Disqualified (DSQ)
White	Did not start (DNS)
White	Withdrew (WD)
White	Race cancelled (C)
Blank	Did not practice (DNP)
Blank	Did not arrive (DNA)
Blank	Excluded (EX)

**Bold** – Pole position
Italics – Fastest lap

==== 250cc ====
Scoring system

Points were awarded to the top fifteen finishers. A rider had to finish the race to earn points.

Position	**1st**	**2nd**	**3rd**	**4th**	**5th**	**6th**	**7th**	**8th**	**9th**	**10th**	**11th**	**12th**	**13th**	**14th**	**15th**
Points	25	20	16	13	11	10	9	8	7	6	5	4	3	2	1

- Riders marked with light blue background were eligible for Rookie of the Year award.

Pos	Rider	Bike	JPN (Japan)	MAL (Malaysia)	ESP (Spain)	ITA (Italy)	FRA (France)	MAD (Community of Madrid)	NED (Netherlands)	GBR (United Kingdom)	GER (Germany)	CZE (Czech Republic)	IMO (Bologna)	CAT (Catalonia)	AUS (Australia)	ARG (Argentina)	Pts
1	(Italy) Loris Capirossi	Aprilia	7	5	**1**	4	3	**3**	**Ret**	**1**	4	**2**	2	**3**	**2**	**2**	224
2	(Italy) Valentino Rossi	Aprilia	Ret	Ret	2	2	2	Ret	1	Ret	3	Ret	1	1	1	1	201
3	(Japan) Tetsuya Harada	Aprilia	4	1	DSQ	**3**	**1**	1	Ret	2	**1**	1	**10**	2	Ret	Ret	200
4	(Japan) Tohru Ukawa	Honda	Ret	2	4	7	Ret	2	5	4	Ret	5	4	5	5	4	145
5	(France) Olivier Jacque	Honda	5	3	3	Ret	4	Ret	Ret			Ret	5	4	3	3	112
6	(Japan) Haruchika Aoki	Honda	11	4	6	6	6	Ret	3	5	Ret	6	6	7	8	Ret	112
7	(Italy) Stefano Perugini	Honda	12	6	7	5	5	Ret	Ret	3	Ret	11	3	6	6	Ret	102
8	(Japan) Takeshi Tsujimura	Yamaha	15	11	8	12	9	7	7	8	6	8	9	10	12	11	91
9	(United Kingdom) Jeremy McWilliams	TSR-Honda	10	7	Ret	Ret	7	9	12	7	2	4	Ret	Ret	Ret	6	87
10	(Spain) Luis D'Antin	Yamaha	DNS	Ret	9	9	8	6	4	9	12	12	11	16	7	Ret	74
11	(Spain) José Luis Cardoso	Yamaha	8	10	Ret	8	13	5	Ret	10	7	10	12	Ret	Ret	Ret	61
12	(Italy) Roberto Rolfo	TSR-Honda	Ret	12	13	Ret	14	10	10	12	11	15	8	8	13	5	61
13	(United Kingdom) Jason Vincent	TSR-Honda	19	14	Ret	Ret	10	8	8	6	5	7	15	11	Ret		60
14	(Italy) Luca Boscoscuro	TSR-Honda	18	Ret	11	10	Ret	Ret	9	DNS	8	9	7	12	10	10	58
15	(Italy) Marcellino Lucchi	Aprilia			5	1						3	Ret	Ret			52
16	(Japan) Noriyasu Numata	Suzuki	9	12	14	Ret	Ret	Ret	11	11	9	14	14	13	9	7	52
17	(Germany) Jürgen Fuchs	Aprilia	17	**8**	Ret	Ret	12	4	2	Ret	DNS						45
18	(Italy) Franco Battaini	Yamaha	Ret	Ret	12	11	11	DNS				13	13	9	Ret	9	34
19	(Japan) Shinya Nakano	Yamaha	2												4		33
20	(Japan) Daijiro Kato	Honda	**1**														25
21	(Sweden) Johan Stigefelt	Suzuki	Ret	Ret	Ret	DNS	Ret	12	15	13	Ret	16	21	15	11	8	22
22	(Argentina) Sebastián Porto	Aprilia	Ret	9	Ret	Ret	Ret	Ret	6	DNS	Ret	Ret	Ret	Ret	Ret	Ret	17
23	(Japan) Naoki Matsudo	Yamaha	3														16
24	(Japan) Osamu Miyazaki	Yamaha	14	15	10	Ret	Ret		DNS			18	18	14	15	14	14
25	(Italy) Davide Bulega	Honda	20	Ret	Ret	14											11
25	(Italy) Davide Bulega	ERP-Honda					16	14	17	DNS	13	20	16	Ret	Ret	12	11
26	(Japan) Yukio Kagayama	Suzuki	6														10
27	(Japan) Yasumasa Hatakeyama	Honda	Ret	Ret	16							17	20	17	14	Ret	9
27	(Japan) Yasumasa Hatakeyama	ERP-Honda				13	Ret	13	16	15	DNS						9
28	(Italy) Ivan Clementi	Yamaha						11	14	Ret	Ret						7
29	(Germany) Alex Hofmann	Honda									10						6
30	(France) William Costes	Honda	DNS	Ret	15	16	Ret	Ret	13	14	Ret						6
31	(Japan) Choujun Kameya	Suzuki	13														3
32	(Italy) Diego Giugovaz	Aprilia											17	18		13	3
33	(United Kingdom) Jamie Robinson	Yamaha								16	14						2
34	(Argentina) Federico Gartner	Aprilia	Ret	16	18	15	Ret	16	WD		Ret	Ret	24	Ret	19	17	1
35	(France) Julien Allemand	Honda					15			17	WD						1
36	(Spain) Ismael Bonilla	Honda			17			15									1
37	(Germany) Mike Baldinger	Honda									15						1
38	(United Kingdom) Woolsey Coulter	Honda								Ret						15	1
	(France) Matthieu Lagrive	Honda					DNS					19	22	19	18	16	0
	(Japan) Makoto Tamada	Honda	16														0
	(Australia) Shaun Geronimi	Yamaha													16		0
	(Malaysia) Shahrol Yuzy	Yamaha		17													0
	(France) Vincent Philippe	Honda					17										0
	(Australia) David Horton	Honda													17		0
	(France) Franck Poulle	Honda					18										0
	(Netherlands) Jarno Janssen	Honda							18								0
	(South Africa) Shane Norval	Honda								18							0
	(Argentina) Diego Ruabén	Honda														18	0
	(Netherlands) Maurice Bolwerk	Honda							19								0
	(Italy) Igor Antonelli	Aprilia											19				0
	(Argentina) Leandro Mulet	Yamaha														19	0
	(Netherlands) Rudie Markink	Honda							20								0
	(Spain) David García	Honda												20			0
	(New Zealand) Craig Frederickson	Honda													20		0
	(Argentina) Gabriel Borgmann	Yamaha														20	0
	(Netherlands) André Romein	Honda							21								0
	(Slovakia) Vladimír Častka	ERP-Honda										21					0
	(Spain) Lucas Oliver Bultó	Honda												21			0
	(Czech Republic) Radomil Rous	Yamaha										22					0
	(Spain) David Ortega	Honda												22			0
	(Italy) Filippo Cotti	Honda											23				0
	(Spain) Eustaquio Gavira	Honda			Ret									Ret			0
	(Spain) Agustín Escobar	Honda			Ret												0
	(France) Hervé Mora	Aprilia					Ret										0
	(Spain) Alex Debón	Honda						Ret									0
	(United Kingdom) Gary May	Aprilia								Ret							0
	(United Kingdom) Paul Jones	Aprilia								Ret							0
	(United Kingdom) Callum Ramsay	Honda								Ret							0
	(Germany) Markus Ober	Honda									Ret						0
	(Germany) Mathias Neukirchen	Aprilia									Ret						0
	(Germany) Adrian Schmidt	Honda									Ret						0
	(Spain) Iván Silva	Honda												Ret			0
	(Australia) William Strugnell	Honda													Ret		0
	(Argentina) Matías Ríos	Yamaha														Ret	0
	(Australia) Martin Craggill	Aprilia													DNS		0
	(Spain) Manuel Luque	Yamaha			DNQ												0
	(Spain) José David de Gea	Yamaha						DNQ									0
	(Netherlands) Henk van de Lagemaat	Honda							DNQ								0
	(Czech Republic) Lukáš Vavrečka	Honda										DNQ					0
	(Germany) Lars Langer	Yamaha										DNQ					0
	(Australia) Adam Brunskill	Yamaha													DNQ		0
Pos.	Rider	Bike	JPN (Japan)	MAL (Malaysia)	ESP (Spain)	ITA (Italy)	FRA (France)	MAD (Community of Madrid)	NED (Netherlands)	GBR (United Kingdom)	GER (Germany)	CZE (Czech Republic)	IMO (Bologna)	CAT (Catalonia)	AUS (Australia)	ARG (Argentina)	Pts

Colour	Result
Gold	Winner
Silver	Second place
Bronze	Third place
Green	Points classification
Blue	Non-points classification
Blue	Non-classified finish (NC)
Purple	Retired, not classified (Ret)
Red	Did not qualify (DNQ)
Red	Did not pre-qualify (DNPQ)
Black	Disqualified (DSQ)
White	Did not start (DNS)
White	Withdrew (WD)
White	Race cancelled (C)
Blank	Did not practice (DNP)
Blank	Did not arrive (DNA)
Blank	Excluded (EX)

**Bold** – Pole position
Italics – Fastest lap

==== 125cc ====
Scoring system

Points were awarded to the top fifteen finishers. A rider had to finish the race to earn points.

Position	**1st**	**2nd**	**3rd**	**4th**	**5th**	**6th**	**7th**	**8th**	**9th**	**10th**	**11th**	**12th**	**13th**	**14th**	**15th**
Points	25	20	16	13	11	10	9	8	7	6	5	4	3	2	1

- Riders marked with light blue background were eligible for Rookie of the Year award.

Pos	Rider	Bike	JPN (Japan)	MAL (Malaysia)	ESP (Spain)	ITA (Italy)	FRA (France)	MAD (Community of Madrid)	NED (Netherlands)	GBR (United Kingdom)	GER (Germany)	CZE (Czech Republic)	IMO (Bologna)	CAT (Catalonia)	AUS (Australia)	ARG (Argentina)	Pts
1	(Japan) Kazuto Sakata	Aprilia	1	6	1	4	1	**4**	**2**	**1**	7	**2**	4	9	4	5	229
2	(Japan) Tomomi Manako	Honda	2	3	2	1	Ret	Ret	3	Ret	1	Ret	1	1	2	1	217
3	(Italy) Marco Melandri	Honda	10	Ret	10	2	2	2	1	4	**13**	1	**2**	8	**3**	2	202
4	(Japan) Masao Azuma	Honda	3	9	4	9	3	Ret	10	Ret	Ret	Ret	3	3	1	4	135
5	(Italy) Lucio Cecchinello	Honda	4	12	Ret	Ret	5	1	4	6	DNS	3	Ret	4	7	3	130
6	(Italy) Mirko Giansanti	Honda	Ret	2	3	Ret	Ret	Ret	6	2	Ret	4	Ret	2	12	6	113
7	(Japan) Masaki Tokudome	Aprilia	8	4	12	10	8	9	5	5	9	Ret	5	13	16	8	97
8	(Italy) Gianluigi Scalvini	Honda	6	13	8	3	Ret	5	Ret	9	Ret	5	12	10	9	10	89
9	(Italy) Roberto Locatelli	Honda	Ret	5	**Ret**	Ret	4	Ret	7	Ret	3	8	7	**5**	6	**Ret**	87
10	(France) Frédéric Petit	Honda	11	7	11	8	6	8	8	8	DNS	10	11	15	14	13	78
11	(Japan) Youichi Ui	Yamaha	Ret	Ret	7	5	11	7	12	3	Ret	Ret	6	Ret	5	15	76
12	(France) Arnaud Vincent	Aprilia	20	10	14	11	12	Ret	16	11	2	6	9	12	Ret	7	72
13	(Japan) Noboru Ueda	Honda	**Ret**	**1**	5	**7**	**Ret**							6	18	9	62
14	(Italy) Ivan Goi	Aprilia	15	15	Ret	13	9	Ret	14	10	11	9	10	11	11	11	53
15	(Japan) Hiroyuki Kikuchi	Honda	7					3	13	15	4	7	DNS				52
16	(Japan) Yoshiaki Katoh	Yamaha	12	17	Ret	19	10	11	Ret	Ret	6	15	8	7	Ret	14	45
17	(Germany) Steve Jenkner	Aprilia	Ret	11	16	14	7	10	9	Ret	8	11	14	16	15	17	45
18	(Italy) Gino Borsoi	Aprilia	Ret	Ret	9	6	Ret	16	11	7	Ret	14	Ret	20	10	12	43
19	(Spain) Ángel Nieto Jr.	Aprilia	13	8	13	Ret	Ret	6	17	12	10	12	Ret	18	13	Ret	41
20	(Czech Republic) Jaroslav Huleš	Honda	Ret	14	6	Ret	Ret	12	15	Ret	Ret	Ret	Ret	19	8	18	25
21	(Spain) Emilio Alzamora	Aprilia	21	16	Ret	17	Ret	Ret	Ret	14	5	Ret	13	14	21	DNS	18
22	(Japan) Nobuyuki Osaki	Yamaha	5														11
23	(Spain) Juan Enrique Maturana	Yamaha	16	Ret	Ret	18	14	15	19	16	12	13	16	Ret	17	16	10
24	(Japan) Takashi Akita	Yamaha	9														7
25	(Italy) Paolo Tessari	Aprilia	19	18	18	12	15										5
26	(Spain) Jerónimo Vidal	Aprilia			19	16	13	Ret	20	Ret	Ret	Ret	Ret		Ret	Ret	3
27	(Spain) Álvaro Molina	Honda			Ret			13						25			3
28	(Italy) Federico Cerroni	Aprilia						Ret	18	13	17	Ret	18	DNS		Ret	3
29	(Spain) Fonsi Nieto	Aprilia			15			14						17			3
30	(Japan) Kazuhiro Takao	Honda	14														2
31	(Italy) Andrea Iommi	Honda				Ret	16	18	21	18	14	16	19	24	22	Ret	2
32	(Italy) Claudio Cipriani	Aprilia				15											1
33	(Italy) Christian Manna	Yamaha	Ret	Ret	Ret	Ret	Ret	Ret	Ret	Ret	15	17	DNS			Ret	1
34	(Italy) Andrea Zappa	Honda											15				1
	(Germany) Klaus Nöhles	Honda									16						0
	(Spain) Jose Ramon Ramirez	Aprilia	17	Ret	17												0
	(Italy) Max Sabbatani	Honda											17				0
	(United Kingdom) Leon Haslam	Honda								17							0
	(France) Randy de Puniet	Honda					17										0
	(Spain) Josep Sardà	Honda						17						23			0
	(Czech Republic) Igor Kaláb	Honda										18					0
	(Germany) Reinhard Stolz	Honda									18						0
	(France) Jimmy Petit	Honda					18										0
	(Italy) Andrea Ballerini	Honda	18	DSQ	Ret												0
	(Italy) Andrea Ballerini	Yamaha												21	19		0
	(Brazil) Cristiano Viera	Honda														19	0
	(Czech Republic) Michal Březina	Honda										19					0
	(Germany) Oliver Perschke	Yamaha									19						0
	(Spain) Iván Martínez	Aprilia						19						Ret			0
	(Brazil) Silvio Cesar	Honda														20	0
	(Australia) Jay Taylor	Honda													20		0
	(Czech Republic) Bohuslav Seifert	Honda										20					0
	(Germany) Dirk Heidolf	Honda									20						0
	(Italy) Marco Tresoldi	Honda				20							Ret				0
	(Spain) Pablo Nieto	Aprilia												22			0
	(Netherlands) Hans Koopman	EGA Honda							22								0
	(Australia) Peter Galvin	Honda													23		0
	(Netherlands) Wilhelm van Leeuwen	Honda							23								0
	(Netherlands) Harold de Haan	Honda							24								0
	(Italy) Alessandro Romagnoli	Aprilia													Ret		0
	(Australia) Anthony West	Honda													Ret		0
	(Australia) Judd Greedy	Honda													Ret		0
	(Spain) Adrián Araujo	Honda												Ret			0
	(Italy) Riccardo Chiarello	Aprilia											Ret				0
	(Czech Republic) Jakub Smrž	Honda										Ret					0
	(Slovakia) Martin Psotný	Honda										Ret					0
	(Germany) Maik Stief	Yamaha									Ret						0
	(United Kingdom) Chris Palmer	Honda								Ret							0
	(United Kingdom) David Mateer	Honda								Ret							0
	(United Kingdom) John Pearson	Honda								Ret							0
	(France) Nicolas Dussauge	Honda					Ret										0
	(Malaysia) Magilai Meganathan	Honda		Ret													0
	(Japan) Yuzo Fujioka	Honda	Ret														0
	(Australia) Chedryian Bresland	Honda													DNS		0
	(San Marino) Manuel Poggiali	Honda											DNS				
	(Spain) Sebastián Perelló	Honda						DNS									
	(Spain) Vicente Esparragoso	Yamaha			DNS												
	(Brazil) César Barros	Honda														DNQ	
	(Netherlands) Ronnie Timmer	Honda							DNQ								
	(Netherlands) Wim Kroegman	Yamaha							DNQ								
Pos.	Rider	Bike	JPN (Japan)	MAL (Malaysia)	ESP (Spain)	ITA (Italy)	FRA (France)	MAD (Community of Madrid)	NED (Netherlands)	GBR (United Kingdom)	GER (Germany)	CZE (Czech Republic)	IMO (Bologna)	CAT (Catalonia)	AUS (Australia)	ARG (Argentina)	Pts

Colour	Result
Gold	Winner
Silver	Second place
Bronze	Third place
Green	Points classification
Blue	Non-points classification
Blue	Non-classified finish (NC)
Purple	Retired, not classified (Ret)
Red	Did not qualify (DNQ)
Red	Did not pre-qualify (DNPQ)
Black	Disqualified (DSQ)
White	Did not start (DNS)
White	Withdrew (WD)
White	Race cancelled (C)
Blank	Did not practice (DNP)
Blank	Did not arrive (DNA)
Blank	Excluded (EX)

**Bold** – Pole position
Italics – Fastest lap

=== Manufacturers' standings ===
==== 500cc ====
Pos.	Manufacturer	JPN (Japan)	MAL (Malaysia)	ESP (Spain)	ITA (Italy)	FRA (France)	MAD (Community of Madrid)	NED (Netherlands)	GBR (United Kingdom)	GER (Germany)	CZE (Czech Republic)	IMO (Bologna)	CAT (Catalonia)	AUS (Australia)	ARG (Argentina)	Pts
1	(Japan) Honda	1	1	1	1	1	1	1	2	1	1	1	1	1	1	345
2	(Japan) Yamaha	3	7	6	6	6	2	3	1	5	5	5	3	2	4	198
3	(Japan) Suzuki	6	6	8	8	8	4	7	7	10	12	9	11	6	12	111
4	(Malaysia) Modenas KR3	11	9	9	11	12	10	12	Ret	6	10	14	10	10	11	73
5	(Germany) MuZ	12	DNS		18	Ret	14	Ret	Ret	13	14	Ret	Ret		Ret	11
	(Italy) Paton				Ret							Ret	16			0
Pos.	Manufacturer	JPN (Japan)	MAL (Malaysia)	ESP (Spain)	ITA (Italy)	FRA (France)	MAD (Community of Madrid)	NED (Netherlands)	GBR (United Kingdom)	GER (Germany)	CZE (Czech Republic)	IMO (Bologna)	CAT (Catalonia)	AUS (Australia)	ARG (Argentina)	Pts

==== 250cc ====
Pos.	Manufacturer	JPN (Japan)	MAL (Malaysia)	ESP (Spain)	ITA (Italy)	FRA (France)	MAD (Community of Madrid)	NED (Netherlands)	GBR (United Kingdom)	GER (Germany)	CZE (Czech Republic)	IMO (Bologna)	CAT (Catalonia)	AUS (Australia)	ARG (Argentina)	Pts
1	(Italy) Aprilia	4	1	1	1	1	1	1	1	1	1	1	1	1	1	338
2	(Japan) Honda	1	2	3	5	4	2	3	3	10	5	3	4	3	3	215
3	(Japan) Yamaha	2	10	8	8	8	5	4	8	6	8	9	9	4	9	134
4	(Japan) TSR-Honda	10	7	11	10	7	8	8	6	2	4	7	8	10	5	128
5	(Japan) Suzuki	6	13	14	Ret	Ret	12	11	11	9	14	14	13	9	7	59
6	(Japan) ERP Honda				13	16	13	16	15	13	20	16	Ret	Ret	12	14
Pos.	Manufacturer	JPN (Japan)	MAL (Malaysia)	ESP (Spain)	ITA (Italy)	FRA (France)	MAD (Community of Madrid)	NED (Netherlands)	GBR (United Kingdom)	GER (Germany)	CZE (Czech Republic)	IMO (Bologna)	CAT (Catalonia)	AUS (Australia)	ARG (Argentina)	Pts

==== 125cc ====
Pos.	Manufacturer	JPN (Japan)	MAL (Malaysia)	ESP (Spain)	ITA (Italy)	FRA (France)	MAD (Community of Madrid)	NED (Netherlands)	GBR (United Kingdom)	GER (Germany)	CZE (Czech Republic)	IMO (Bologna)	CAT (Catalonia)	AUS (Australia)	ARG (Argentina)	Pts
1	(Japan) Honda	2	1	2	1	2	1	1	2	1	1	1	1	1	1	330
2	(Italy) Aprilia	1	4	1	4	1	4	2	1	2	2	4	9	4	5	243
3	(Japan) Yamaha	5	17	7	5	10	7	12	3	6	13	6	7	5	14	111
	(Netherlands) EGA Honda							22								0
Pos.	Manufacturer	JPN (Japan)	MAL (Malaysia)	ESP (Spain)	ITA (Italy)	FRA (France)	MAD (Community of Madrid)	NED (Netherlands)	GBR (United Kingdom)	GER (Germany)	CZE (Czech Republic)	IMO (Bologna)	CAT (Catalonia)	AUS (Australia)	ARG (Argentina)	Pts
