= 1998 Czech Republic motorcycle Grand Prix =

1998 Czech Republic Grand Prix
Race details
- Race 10 of 14 races in the 1998 Grand Prix motorcycle racing season
- Date: 23 August 1998
- Official name: Grand Prix České republiky
- Location: Brno Circuit
- Course: Permanent racing facility; 5.403 km (3.357 mi)

500cc
Pole position
- Rider: (Australia) Mick Doohan
- Time: 2:01.585
Fastest lap
- Rider: (Spain) Àlex Crivillé
- Time: 2:02.335 on lap 22
Podium
- First: (Italy) Max Biaggi
- Second: (Spain) Àlex Crivillé
- Third: (Brazil) Alex Barros

250cc
Pole position
- Rider: (Italy) Loris Capirossi
- Time: 2:03.974
Fastest lap
- Rider: (Italy) Loris Capirossi
- Time: 2:04.614 on lap 9
Podium
- First: (Japan) Tetsuya Harada
- Second: (Italy) Loris Capirossi
- Third: (Italy) Marcellino Lucchi

125cc
Pole position
- Rider: (Japan) Kazuto Sakata
- Time: 2:11.302
Fastest lap
- Rider: (Japan) Masao Azuma
- Time: 2:10.899 on lap 16
Podium
- First: (Italy) Marco Melandri
- Second: (Japan) Kazuto Sakata
- Third: (Italy) Lucio Cecchinello

The 1998 Czech Republic motorcycle Grand Prix was the tenth round of the 1998 Grand Prix motorcycle racing season. It took place on 23 August 1998 at the Masaryk Circuit located in Brno, Czech Republic.

== 500 cc classification ==
Pos.	No.	Rider	Team	Manufacturer	Laps	Time/Retired	Grid	Points
1	6	(Italy) Max Biaggi	Marlboro Team Kanemoto	Honda	22	45:12.043	2	25
2	4	(Spain) Àlex Crivillé	Repsol Honda	Honda	22	+0.768	6	20
3	9	(Brazil) Alex Barros	Honda Gresini	Honda	22	+1.546	5	16
4	2	(Japan) Tadayuki Okada	Repsol Honda	Honda	22	+2.235	7	13
5	5	(Japan) Norick Abe	Yamaha Team Rainey	Yamaha	22	+11.817	12	11
6	15	(Spain) Sete Gibernau	Repsol Honda	Honda	22	+11.946	16	10
7	8	(Spain) Carlos Checa	Movistar Honda Pons	Honda	22	+16.317	10	9
8	12	(France) Jean-Michel Bayle	Yamaha Team Rainey	Yamaha	22	+18.526	3	8
9	55	(France) Régis Laconi	Red Bull Yamaha WCM	Yamaha	22	+24.157	13	7
10	10	(United States) Kenny Roberts Jr.	Team Roberts	Modenas KR3	22	+30.549	8	6
11	11	(New Zealand) Simon Crafar	Red Bull Yamaha WCM	Yamaha	22	+34.563	11	5
12	3	(Japan) Nobuatsu Aoki	Suzuki Grand Prix Team	Suzuki	22	+38.113	9	4
13	28	(Germany) Ralf Waldmann	Marlboro Team Roberts	Modenas KR3	22	+38.525	4	3
14	77	(Switzerland) Eskil Suter	MuZ Roc RennSport	MuZ	22	+46.145	14	2
15	19	(United States) John Kocinski	Movistar Honda Pons	Honda	22	+53.129	17	1
16	17	(Netherlands) Jurgen van den Goorbergh	Dee Cee Jeans Racing Team	Honda	22	+54.201	15	
17	14	(Spain) Juan Borja	Shell Advance Racing	Honda	22	+1:22.039	18	
18	27	(Japan) Katsuaki Fujiwara	Suzuki Grand Prix Team	Suzuki	22	+1:30.723	20	
19	22	(France) Sébastien Gimbert	Tecmas Honda Elf	Honda	22	+1:33.693	19	
20	23	(United States) Matt Wait	FCC TSR	Honda	22	+1:33.862	23	
21	88	(United Kingdom) Scott Smart	Team Millar Honda Britain	Honda	22	+1:57.956	21	
Ret	1	(Australia) Mick Doohan	Repsol Honda	Honda	13	Retirement	1	
Ret	57	(Italy) Fabio Carpani	Team Polini Inoxmacel	Honda	0	Accident	22	
DNS	18	(Australia) Garry McCoy	Shell Advance Racing	Honda		Did not start		

== 250 cc classification ==
Pos.	No.	Rider	Manufacturer	Laps	Time/Retired	Grid	Points
1	31	(Japan) Tetsuya Harada	Aprilia	20	41:52.318	4	25
2	65	(Italy) Loris Capirossi	Aprilia	20	+5.207	1	20
3	34	(Italy) Marcellino Lucchi	Aprilia	20	+28.254	3	16
4	9	(United Kingdom) Jeremy McWilliams	TSR-Honda	20	+30.432	6	13
5	5	(Japan) Tohru Ukawa	Honda	20	+30.703	8	11
6	6	(Japan) Haruchika Aoki	Honda	20	+31.090	10	10
7	24	(United Kingdom) Jason Vincent	TSR-Honda	20	+49.163	13	9
8	7	(Japan) Takeshi Tsujimura	Yamaha	20	+49.284	11	8
9	37	(Italy) Luca Boscoscuro	TSR-Honda	20	+49.398	16	7
10	17	(Spain) José Luis Cardoso	Yamaha	20	+50.301	19	6
11	4	(Italy) Stefano Perugini	Honda	20	+57.812	7	5
12	8	(Spain) Luis d'Antin	Yamaha	20	+57.996	15	4
13	21	(Italy) Franco Battaini	Yamaha	20	+1:01.297	12	3
14	12	(Japan) Noriyasu Numata	Suzuki	20	+1:10.103	9	2
15	44	(Italy) Roberto Rolfo	TSR-Honda	20	+1:15.633	17	1
16	16	(Sweden) Johan Stigefelt	Suzuki	20	+1:15.721	20	
17	25	(Japan) Yasumasa Hatakeyama	Honda	20	+1:37.942	23	
18	18	(Japan) Osamu Miyazaki	Yamaha	20	+1:39.729	18	
19	22	(France) Matthieu Lagrive	Honda	20	+1:39.892	24	
20	14	(Italy) Davide Bulega	ERP Honda	20	+1:40.228	21	
21	88	(Slovakia) Vladimír Častka	ERP Honda	20	+1:49.466	22	
22	89	(Czech Republic) Radomil Rous	Yamaha	19	+1 lap	26	
Ret	19	(France) Olivier Jacque	Honda	11	Retirement	5	
Ret	27	(Argentina) Sebastián Porto	Aprilia	11	Retirement	14	
Ret	41	(Argentina) Federico Gartner	Aprilia	8	Retirement	25	
Ret	46	(Italy) Valentino Rossi	Aprilia	0	Accident	2	
DNQ	90	(Czech Republic) Lukáš Vavrečka	Honda		Did not qualify		
DNQ	91	(Germany) Lars Langer	Yamaha		Did not qualify		

== 125 cc classification ==
Pos.	No.	Rider	Manufacturer	Laps	Time/Retired	Grid	Points
1	13	(Italy) Marco Melandri	Honda	19	42:05.161	7	25
2	4	(Japan) Kazuto Sakata	Aprilia	19	+0.038	1	20
3	10	(Italy) Lucio Cecchinello	Honda	19	+0.364	3	16
4	32	(Italy) Mirko Giansanti	Honda	19	+3.745	14	13
5	8	(Italy) Gianluigi Scalvini	Honda	19	+3.794	11	11
6	21	(France) Arnaud Vincent	Aprilia	19	+7.082	13	10
7	52	(Japan) Hiroyuki Kikuchi	Honda	19	+7.144	12	9
8	15	(Italy) Roberto Locatelli	Honda	19	+7.260	9	8
9	26	(Italy) Ivan Goi	Aprilia	19	+9.179	15	7
10	9	(France) Frédéric Petit	Honda	19	+12.170	16	6
11	22	(Germany) Steve Jenkner	Aprilia	19	+15.272	10	5
12	29	(Spain) Ángel Nieto, Jr.	Aprilia	19	+33.909	20	4
13	17	(Spain) Enrique Maturana	Yamaha	19	+35.083	22	3
14	23	(Italy) Gino Borsoi	Aprilia	19	+35.333	19	2
15	62	(Japan) Yoshiaki Katoh	Yamaha	19	+54.524	17	1
16	65	(Italy) Andrea Iommi	Honda	19	+1:14.415	26	
17	16	(Italy) Christian Manna	Yamaha	19	+1:30.848	24	
18	89	(Czech Republic) Igor Kaláb	Honda	19	+2:05.233	27	
19	92	(Czech Republic) Michal Březina	Honda	19	+2:06.630	28	
20	93	(Czech Republic) Bohuslav Seifert	Honda	18	+1 lap	30	
Ret	20	(Japan) Masao Azuma	Honda	18	Accident	4	
Ret	3	(Japan) Tomomi Manako	Honda	15	Retirement	2	
Ret	41	(Japan) Youichi Ui	Yamaha	14	Accident	8	
Ret	39	(Czech Republic) Jaroslav Huleš	Honda	8	Retirement	6	
Ret	5	(Japan) Masaki Tokudome	Aprilia	7	Accident	5	
Ret	7	(Spain) Emilio Alzamora	Aprilia	6	Accident	18	
Ret	91	(Slovakia) Martin Psotný	Honda	4	Retirement	29	
Ret	59	(Spain) Jerónimo Vidal	Aprilia	2	Accident	23	
Ret	14	(Italy) Federico Cerroni	Aprilia	0	Accident	21	
Ret	90	(Czech Republic) Jakub Smrž	Honda	0	Accident	25	

== Championship standings after the race (500cc) ==
Below are the standings for the top five riders and constructors after round ten has concluded.

Riders' Championship standings

Pos.	Rider	Points
1	(Italy) Max Biaggi	173
2	(Spain) Àlex Crivillé	162
3	(Australia) Mick Doohan	160
4	(Spain) Carlos Checa	115
5	(Brazil) Alex Barros	87

Constructors' Championship standings

Pos.	Constructor	Points
1	(Japan) Honda	245
2	(Japan) Yamaha	138
3	(Japan) Suzuki	85
4	(Malaysia) Modenas KR3	54
5	(Germany) MuZ	11

- Note: Only the top five positions are included for both sets of standings.

Previous race: 1998 German Grand Prix	FIM Grand Prix World Championship; 1998 season	Next race: 1998 City of Imola Grand Prix
Previous race: 1997 Czech Republic Grand Prix	Czech Republic Grand Prix	Next race: 1999 Czech Republic Grand Prix
