= Craig Connell =

Australian motorcycle racer

- Nationality: Australian
- Born: 16 May 1968 (age 58); Australia

Craig Connell (born 16 May 1968) is a Grand Prix motorcycle racer from Australia.

== Career statistics ==
=== By season ===
Season	Class	Motorcycle	Race	Win	Podium	Pole	FLap	Pts	Plcd
1994	250cc	Honda	1	0	0	0	0	5	28th
1995	250cc	Yamaha	1	0	0	0	0	0	NC
1996	250cc	Yamaha	1	0	0	0	0	0	NC
1998	500cc	Honda	3	0	0	0	0	0	NC
Total			6	0	0	0	0	5	
