= Jürgen Fuchs (motorcyclist) =

German motorcycle racer (born 1965)

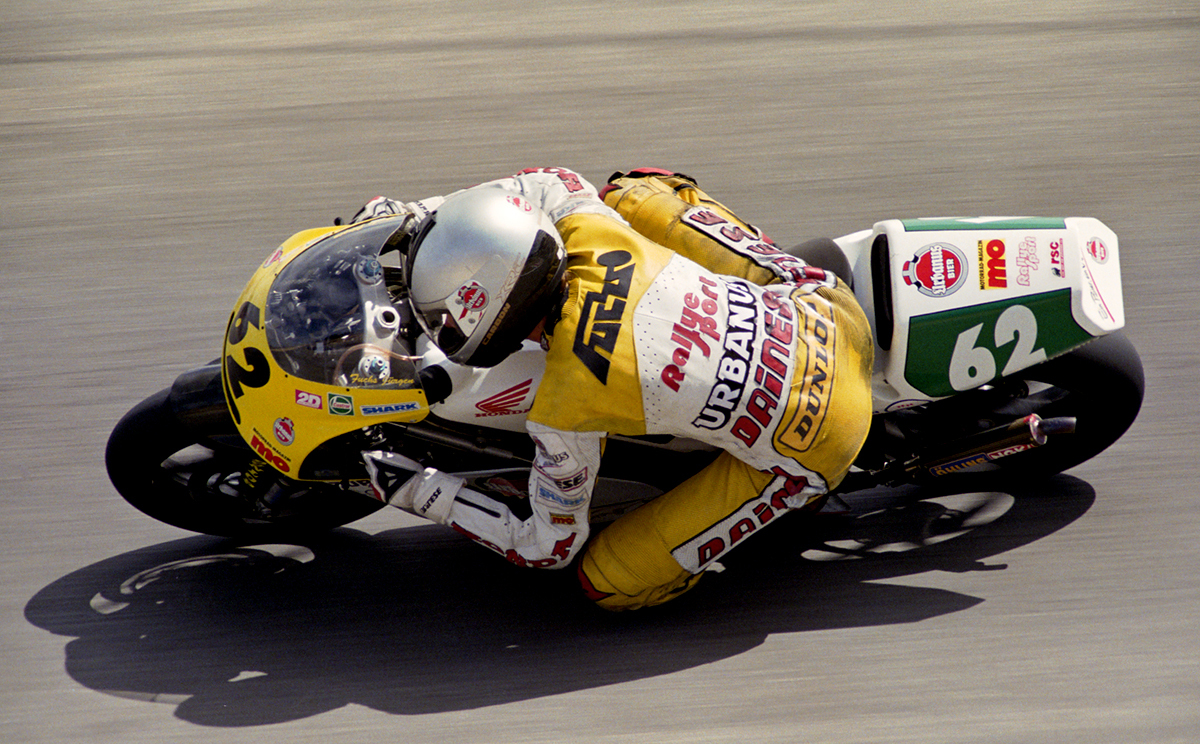
- Jürgen Fuchs at the 1994 U.S. Grand Prix
- Nationality: German
Motorcycle racing career statistics
Grand Prix motorcycle racing
Active years	1994 - 1998
First race	1994 250cc German Grand Prix
Last race	1998 250cc German Grand Prix
Starts / Wins / Podiums / Poles / F. laps / Points; 56 / 0 / 5 / 1 / 0 / 302

Jürgen Fuchs (born 28 November 1965) is a former German Grand Prix motorcycle road racer. He achieved his best result in 1996 when he finished the year in fourth place in the 250cc world championship. Fuchs served as a development rider for BMW's new S1000RR motorcycle, scheduled to compete in the 2009 Superbike World Championship. He currently serves as a racing instructor at MotoRacingSchool.

== History of Racing ==
In 1994, Fuchs began with Germany's Grand Prix at the Hockenheimring in the 250 c.c. class. In his first World Championship race, Fuchs came 18th, and just missed out on collecting some points. In 1994, Fuchs had to contest a further four Grands Prix before entering the World Championship a year later.

In his first complete season in the 250 c.c. World Championship, Fuchs achieved his best results in Argentina and Catalonia with eighth place at the season's end. He was to add further successes a year later. With the Netherlands Grand Prix at Assen, Fuchs was to stand on a World Championship podium for the first time on 29 June 1996 - behind his teammate and fellow-countryman Ralf Waldmann and ahead of a certain Max Biaggi. At the Nürburgring, A1 ring and in Rio de Janeiro, he added third places to this. Fuchs ended the season in fourth place - behind Biaggi, the world champion, Waldmann and Olivier Jacque.

A year later, Fuchs rose to prominence in the 500 c.c. two-cylinder premium class. A sixth place in Brazil was to be the best result by Fuchs in the ELF 500. In 1998, the German returned to the 250 c.c. class and achieved his last of five Grand Prix podium positions - he came second, behind Valentino Rossi and in front of Haruchika Aoki. The season ended with a fall, which also brought Jürgen Fuchs' racing career to a premature end. Initially, Fuchs wanted to hang up his helmet for the last time, but after some time, his urge to ride returned and he became a fixture at the GP Racing School.
