= Alan Carter (motorcyclist) =

British motorcycle racer (born 1964)

- Nationality: (United Kingdom) British
- Born: 19 August 1964 (age 62); Halifax, West Yorkshire, England
Motorcycle racing career statistics
Grand Prix motorcycle racing
Active years	1983 - 1990
First race	1983 250cc South African Grand Prix
Last race	1990 250cc British Grand Prix
First win	1983 250cc French Grand Prix
Last win	1983 250cc French Grand Prix
Championships	0
Starts / Wins / Podiums / Poles / F. laps / Points; 52 / 1 / 1 / 0 / 2 / 93

Alan Carter (born 19 August 1964) is an English former professional Grand Prix motorcycle road racer. He competed from 1983 to 1990 in the Grand Prix world championship. Carter won the second Grand Prix race he entered, in the 250cc class at the 1983 250cc French Grand Prix as an eighteen-year-old, creating a sensation. However, he was never able to fulfill his potential and never won another Grand Prix. He had his best season in 1985 when he finished in seventh place in the 250cc world championship. Carter competed in the Superbike World Championship in 1994.

Carter is the younger brother of former two-time British Speedway Champion Kenny Carter (1961–1986).

== Racing career statistics ==
Points system from 1969 to 1987:

**Position**	1	2	3	4	5	6	7	8	9	10
**Points**	15	12	10	8	6	5	4	3	2	1

Points system from 1988 to 1992:

**Position**	1	2	3	4	5	6	7	8	9	10	11	12	13	14	15
**Points**	20	17	15	13	11	10	9	8	7	6	5	4	3	2	1

(key) (Races in bold indicate pole position; races in italics indicate fastest lap)

Year	Class	Team	Machine	1	2	3	4	5	6	7	8	9	10	11	12	13	14	15	Points	Rank	Wins
1983	250cc	Team Mitsui Yamaha	YZR250	RSA; Ret	FRA; 1	NAT; Ret	GER; 13	ESP; Ret	AUT; Ret	YUG; DNS	NED; Ret	BEL; DNQ	GBR; 14	SWE; 5					21	12th	1
1984	250cc	Marlboro Roberts Yamaha	YZR250	RSA; 10	NAT -	ESP; 4	AUT; 16	GER; 7	FRA; Ret	YUG; 7	NED; Ret	BEL; 23	GBR; Ret	SWE; 4	SMR; Ret				25	9th	0
1985	250cc	Donington Park	RS250R	RSA; 16	ESP; 4	GER; 4	NAT; 9	AUT; 17	YUG; DNF	NED; 13	BEL; 9	FRA; DNF	GBR; 7	SWE; 4	SMR; DNF				32	7th	0
1986	250cc	Braun Cobas	JJ Cobas-Rotax	ESP; 10	NAT; 11	GER; 10	AUT ??	YUG; DNF	NED; 15	BEL ??	FRA; 20	GBR ??	SWE; 10	SMR ??					9	17th	0
1987	250cc	Moriwaki	NSR250	JPN; DNF	ESP -	GER -	NAT -	AUT -	YUG -	NED -	FRA -	GBR -	SWE -	CZE -	SMR -	POR -	BRA -	ARG -	0	??	0
1988	250cc	Yamaha	YZR250	JPN -	USA; 15	ESP -	EXP -	NAT -	GER -	AUT -	NED -	BEL -	YUG -	FRA -	GBR -	SWE -	CZE -	BRA -	1	48th	0
1989	250cc	??	??	JPN	AUS	USA ??	SPA	NAT	GER	AUT	YUG	NED	BEL	FRA	GBR	SWE	CZE	BRA	0	??	0
1989	500cc	??	??	JPN	AUS	USA	SPA	NAT	GER	AUT	YUG	NED	BEL	FRA	GBR; Ret	SWE; Ret	CZE	BRA	0	81st	0
1990	250cc	Honda Britain	RS250R	JPN; 18	USA ??	ESP -	NAT -	GER -	AUT -	YUG -	NED -	BEL -	FRA ??	GBR; 13	SWE -	CZE -	HUN -	AUS -	3	40th	0
