= Daryl Beattie =

Australian motorcycle racer

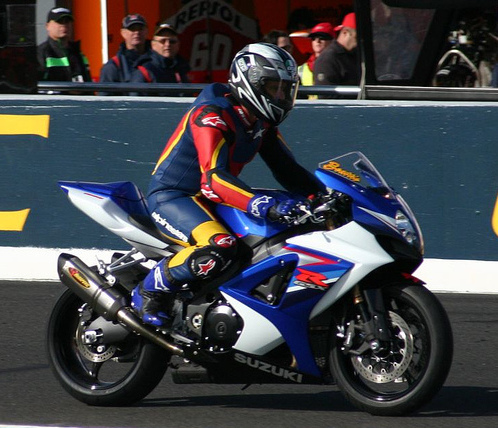
- Nationality: Australian
- Born: 26 September 1970 (age 56); Charleville, Queensland, Australia
Motorcycle racing career statistics
Grand Prix motorcycle racing
Active years	1989 - 1997
First race	1989 250cc Australian Grand Prix
Last race	1997 500cc Australian Grand Prix
First win	1993 500cc German Grand Prix
Last win	1995 500cc German Grand Prix
Team(s)	Honda, Yamaha, Suzuki
Championships	0
Starts / Wins / Podiums / Poles / F. laps / Points; 59 / 3 / 14 / 0 / 1 / 557

Daryl Glen Beattie (born 26 September 1970) is an Australian former motorcycle racer.

== Motorsport career ==
Beattie posted several good results at the beginning of the 1992 500cc Grand Prix season then teamed up with Wayne Gardner to win the prestigious Suzuka 8 Hours endurance race in Japan. His performance earned him a place on the Honda factory team alongside fellow Australian Mick Doohan for the 1993 season. He won his first Grand Prix that year at the German Grand Prix at Hockenheimring and finished the season in a promising third place behind Kevin Schwantz and Wayne Rainey. After the season, he was inexplicably released by the Honda team.

Beattie had a lackluster season in 1994 on a Team Roberts Marlboro Yamaha. During the 1994 season at the French Le Mans circuit, he crashed and lost all the toes from one foot after his foot was caught between the chain and rear sprocket. He had his best year in 1995 with the Suzuki factory team, leading the championship for the first part of the season before his crash at Assen allowed Doohan to win the championship with Beattie finishing in second, 33 points behind Doohan.

Beattie's career took a blow in 1996 when he crashed in pre-season testing and suffered serious head injuries. He returned only to suffer another crash at the fourth race of the season in Spain. He then crashed again at the sixth round in France. He struggled through the 1997 season but never regained his previous form and announced his retirement from competitive racing at the end of the season.

In 2002, Beattie took up V8 Supercar racing in Imrie Motor Sport's Holden VX Commodore VX at the Queensland 500 and Bathurst 1000. He placed 25th at Queensland Raceway and did not finish at Bathurst.

== Television ==
In retirement, Beattie took up a role as a specialist commentator with Network Ten on broadcasts of motorcycle racing, initially calling the 125 cc & 250 cc races and then taking over from Barry Sheene to call the MotoGP races after Sheene died from cancer. He was subsequently added to the presenters on RPM. Beattie now works as a commentator on Network Ten's partially sports themed channel 10 Bold. As of 2015 he is the co-host of Ten's Formula One coverage alongside Matthew White and expert F1 commentator, 1980 World Champion Alan Jones.

In an interview on The Project in 2015, Beattie commented on the 1994 Le Mans motorcycle accident where he lost the toes of his left foot in the motorcycle chain.

== Grand Prix career statistics ==
Points system from 1988 to 1992

**Position**	1	2	3	4	5	6	7	8	9	10
**Points**	20	15	12	10	8	6	4	3	2	1

Points system from 1993

**Position**	1	2	3	4	5	6	7	8	9	10	11	12	13	14	15
**Points**	25	20	16	13	11	10	9	8	7	6	5	4	3	2	1

(key) (Races in bold indicate pole position; races in italics indicate fastest lap)

Year	Class	Team	Machine	1	2	3	4	5	6	7	8	9	10	11	12	13	14	15	Points	Rank	Wins
1989	250cc	Honda	NSR250	JPN	AUS; 12	USA	ESP	NAT	GER	AUT	YUG	NED	BEL	FRA	GBR	SWE	CZE	BRA	4	35th	0
1990	250cc	Honda	NSR250	JPN	USA	ESP	NAT	GER	AUT	YUG	NED	BEL	FRA	GBR	SWE	CZE	HUN	AUS; 4	13	22nd	0
1992	500cc	Rothmans Honda	NSR500	JPN; NC	AUS; 3	MAL; 6	ESP	ITA	EUR	GER	NED	HUN	FRA	GBR	BRA	RSA			18	14th	0
1993	500cc	Rothmans Honda	NSR500	AUS; 4	MAL; 2	JPN; 3	ESP; 6	AUT; 7	GER; 1	NED; NC	EUR; 4	RSM; 6	GBR; 6	CZE; 6	ITA; 7	USA; 5	FIM; 2		176	**3rd**	1
1994	500cc	Marlboro Yamaha	YZR500	AUS; NC	MAL; 10	JPN; 28	ESP; NC	AUT; 8	GER; NC	NED; 7	ITA; 6	FRA; DNS	GBR	CZE	USA; NC	ARG; NC	EUR; 5		44	13th	0
1995	500cc	Lucky Strike Suzuki	RGV500	AUS; 2	MAL; 2	JPN; 1	ESP; 7	GER; 1	ITA; 2	NED	FRA; 3	GBR; 2	CZE; 3	BRA; 4	ARG; 2	EUR; 5			215	**2nd**	2
1996	500cc	Lucky Strike Suzuki	RGV500	MAL	INA	JPN; 5	ESP; NC	ITA; 4	FRA	NED	GER	GBR	AUT	CZE	IMO	CAT; NC	BRA	AUS	24	18th	0
1997	500cc	Lucky Strike Suzuki	RGV500	MAL; NC	JPN; NC	ESP; 12	ITA; 5	AUT; 11	FRA; 12	NED; 7	IMO; 13	GER; 12	BRA; 13	GBR; 6	CZE; 10	CAT; 17	INA; 12	AUS; DNS	63	11th	0

=== Suzuka 8 Hours results ===
Year	Team	Co-Rider	Bike	Pos
1992	(Japan) Oki Honda Racing Team	(Australia) Wayne Gardner (Australia) Daryl Beattie	Honda RVF750 RC45	**1st**

== Complete V8 Supercar results ==
Year	Team	1	2	3	4	5	6	7	8	9	10	11	12	13	Final pos	Points
2002	Imrie Motor Sport	ADL	PHI	ECK	HDV	CAN	PTH	ORP	WIN	QLD; 25	BAT; Ret	SUR	PUK	SAN	74th	16

== Bibliography ==
- Flack, Darryl (30 August 2023). The Immortals of Australian Motorcycle Racing: The World Champs (Part of the 7-volume comprehensive sports collection). Immortals of Australian Sport (7-book series). Gelding Street Press. ISBN 978-0-6452070-5-7.
