= Taru Rinne =

Finnish motorcycle racer

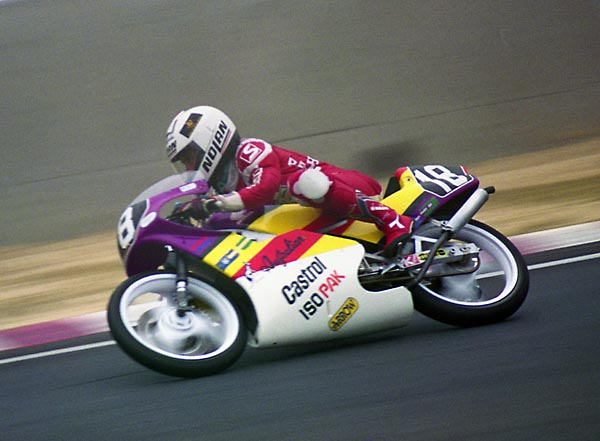
- Rinne at the 1990 Japanese Grand Prix
- Nationality: Finnish
Motorcycle racing career statistics
Grand Prix motorcycle racing
Active years	1987–1991
First race	1988 125cc French Grand Prix
Last race	1990 125cc Australian Grand Prix
Championships	0
Starts / Wins / Podiums / Poles / F. laps / Points; 22 / 0 / 0 / 0 / 0 / 25

Taru Rinne (born 27 August 1968 in Turku) is a Finnish former professional motorcycle racer. She was the first woman to achieve points in Grand Prix motorcycle racing.

== Career ==
=== Karting ===
Rinne started her racing career in karting, competing against future Formula One drivers Mika Häkkinen, Mika Salo and Jyrki Järvilehto on multiple occasions. She won the Finnish Karting Championship in the 85cc class in 1979, ahead of Häkkinen. In 1980, she finished second behind Salo and ahead of Häkkinen who was fourth. She battled with Häkkinen again in 1981, and this time finished second in the series with Häkkinen becoming the champion. The next year, Rinne won the series again and Häkkinen had to settle with second place. In 1983, she also finished first in the championship but was disqualified from the last race due to illegal fuel. Thus the title went to Häkkinen. She was also given a personal one-year ban from racing, which eventually ended her promising career in karting.

Häkkinen has later commented on Rinne:

"I used to race go-karts in Finland, and my toughest opponent was a girl," he explains. Häkkinen was ten or eleven years old at the time and was regularly beaten by her. "She really went full throttle," he says, still impressed. "Sometimes I couldn't understand how great this driver was. She had a fantastic racing line and incredible talent."

=== Road Racing ===
Despite her success on four wheels, Rinne decided to switch to motorcycles and debuted in the Road Racing World Championship, now known as MotoGP, in 1987. In 1988, she got her first points, the first woman ever to do so. In 1989, she qualified second with her Honda bike for the 125cc class GP at Hockenheim and managed to lead the race for a while. She eventually finished seventh in the race and 17th overall for the season.

This was to remain her best ever result, as Rinne got into a bad accident at Paul Ricard during practice in 1991, breaking both her ancles. While recovering from the accident, she got a letter from Bernie Ecclestone, who at the time decided which riders are allowed to compete in the series. The letter said that she is not qualified to compete next season. This ended her career at top-level and Rinne later said that the letter was the biggest disappointment of her life.

== Motorcycle Grand Prix Results ==
Points system from 1969 to 1987:

**Position**	1	2	3	4	5	6	7	8	9	10
**Points**	15	12	10	8	6	5	4	3	2	1

Points system from 1988 to 1992:

**Position**	1	2	3	4	5	6	7	8	9	10	11	12	13	14	15
**Points**	20	17	15	13	11	10	9	8	7	6	5	4	3	2	1

(key) (Races in bold indicate pole position; races in italics indicate fastest lap)

Year	Class	Bike	1	2	3	4	5	6	7	8	9	10	11	12	13	14	Starts	Points	Rank
1987	125cc	MBA	ESP -	GER -	NAT -	AUT -	NED -	FRA -	GBR -	SWE -	CZE; 20	RSM -	POR -				2	0	—
1988	125cc	Honda	ESP -	NAT -	GER -	AUT -	NED -	BEL -	YUG -	FRA; 14	GBR -	SWE; 25	CZE -				3	2	37th
1989	125cc	Honda	JPN -	AUS -	ESP; 15	NAT; 19	GER; 7	AUT -	NED; 8	BEL -	FRA -	GBR -	SWE; 15	CZE; 12			7	23	17th
1990	125cc	Honda	JPN; 26	ESP -	NAT -	GER -	AUT -	YUG -	NED; 23	BEL -	FRA -	GBR -	SWE -	CZE; 21	HUN; 16	AUS; 19	5	0	—
1991	125cc	Honda	JPN -	AUS -	ESP; DNQ	ITA; DNQ	GER; DNQ	AUT; DNQ	EUR; DNQ	NED -	FRA -	GBR -	RSM -	CZE -	MAL -		0	0	—
