= Masahiro Shimizu =

Japanese motorcycle racer

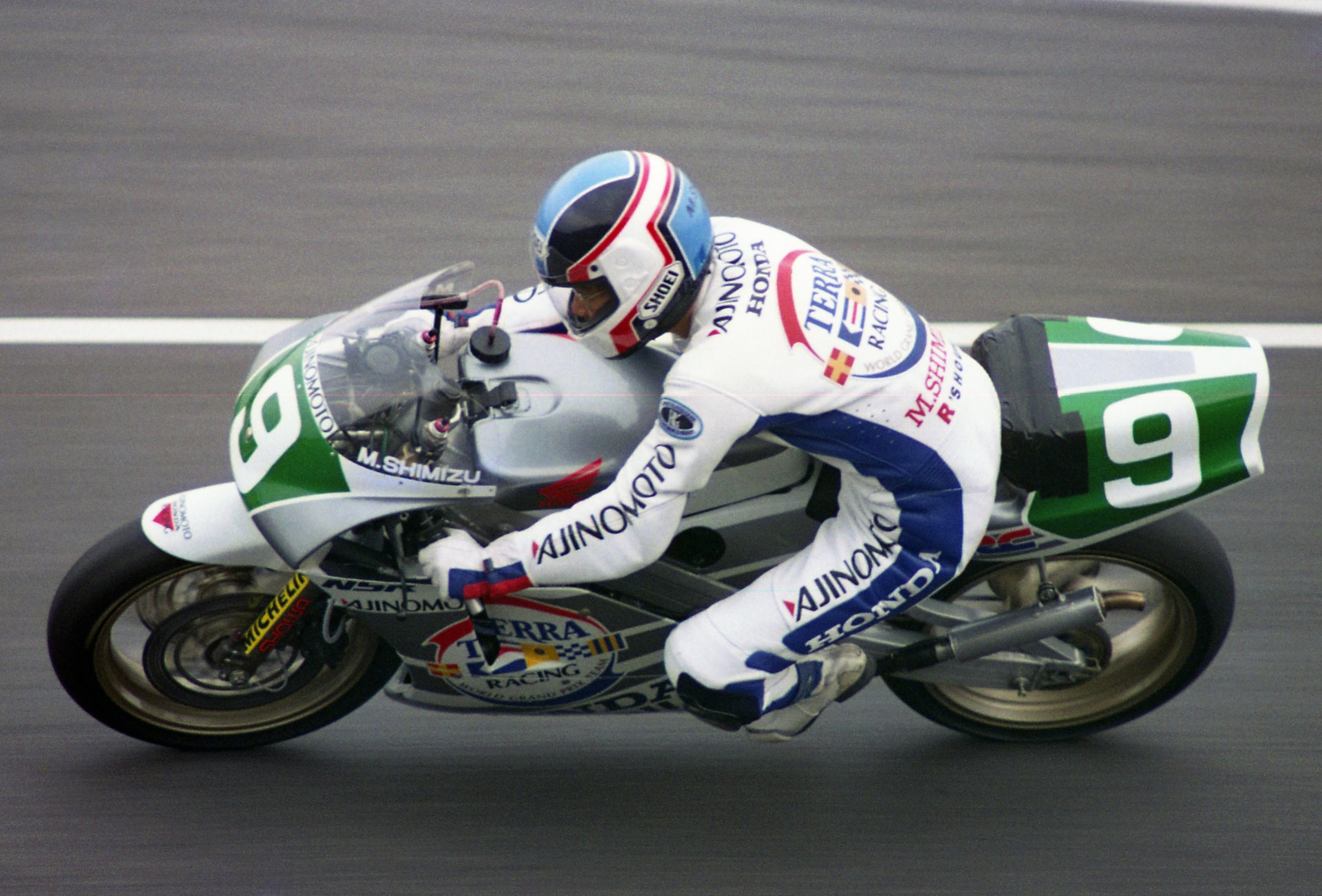
- Nationality: Japanese
Motorcycle racing career statistics
Grand Prix motorcycle racing
Active years	1987 - 1992
First race	1987 250cc Japanese Grand Prix
Last race	1992 250cc South African Grand Prix
Team	Honda
Starts / Wins / Podiums / Poles / F. laps / Points; 73 / 0 / 9 / 1 / 0 / 497

Masahiro Shimizu (清水 雅広, Shimizu Masahiro; born November 22, 1964) is a Japanese former professional Grand Prix motorcycle road racer.

Originally from Fujisawa, Kanagawa Prefecture, Shimizu won the 1987 250cc All Japan Road Race Championship. He began his Grand Prix career with a win in 1987. His best season was in 1991, when he finished fifth in the 250cc world championship, riding on a Honda.

== Motorcycle Grand Prix Results ==
Points system from 1969 to 1987:

**Position**	1	2	3	4	5	6	7	8	9	10
**Points**	15	12	10	8	6	5	4	3	2	1

Points system from 1988 to 1992:

**Position**	1	2	3	4	5	6	7	8	9	10	11	12	13	14	15
**Points**	20	17	15	13	11	10	9	8	7	6	5	4	3	2	1

(key) (Races in bold indicate pole position; races in italics indicate fastest lap)

Year	Class	Team	1	2	3	4	5	6	7	8	9	10	11	12	13	14	15	Points	Rank	Wins
1987	250cc	Honda	**JPN**; 4	ESP -	GER -	NAT -	AUT -	YUG -	NED -	FRA -	GBR -	SWE -	CZE -	RSM -	POR -	BRA; 9	ARG; 3	20	13th	0
1988	250cc	Honda	JPN -	USA -	ESP; 5	EXP; 2	NAT; 4	GER; NC	AUT; 6	NED; NC	BEL; NC	YUG; NC	FRA; NC	GBR; 9	SWE; NC	CZE; 13	BRA; 9	68	10th	0
1989	250cc	Honda	JPN; 13	AUS; 14	USA; 10	ESP; 7	NAT; 11	GER; 3	AUT; 10	YUG -	NED; 11	BEL; 9	FRA; 7	GBR; 3	SWE; NC	CZE; 2	BRA; 2	116	6th	0
1990	250cc	Honda	JPN; NC	USA; 11	ESP; NC	NAT; 8	GER; 6	AUT; NC	YUG; 12	NED; 4	BEL; 9	FRA; 4	GBR; 2	SWE; 3	CZE; NC	HUN; NC	AUS; 8	100	7th	0
1991	250cc	Honda	JPN; 8	AUS; NC	USA; 5	ESP; 4	ITA; 7	GER; 5	AUT; 6	EUR; 6	NED; 6	FRA; 6	GBR; 4	RSM; 4	CZE; 4	VDM; 5	MAL; NC	142	5th	0
1992	250cc	Honda	JPN; NC	AUS; NC	MAL; 8	ESP; 3	ITA; 8	EUR; NC	GER; 5	NED; 5	HUN; 4	FRA; NC	GBR; 9	BRA; 13	RSA; 11			46	9th	0
