= Helmut Bradl =

German motorcycle racer

- Nationality: German
Motorcycle racing career statistics
Grand Prix motorcycle racing
Active years	1986 - 1993
First race	1986 250cc Yugoslavian Grand Prix
Last race	1993 250cc FIM Grand Prix
First win	1991 250cc Spanish Grand Prix
Last win	1991 250cc Vitesse Du Mans Grand Prix
Team	Honda
Starts / Wins / Podiums / Poles / F. laps / Points; 84 / 5 / 21 / 12 / 5 / 700

Helmut Bradl (born 17 November 1961) is a German former professional Grand Prix motorcycle road racer. He was the 1985 OMK-Pokal Champion.

He raced exclusively in the 250 class. His best year was in 1991, when he won five races on a Honda and ended the season ranked second after a tight points battle with Luca Cadalora. His son, Stefan Bradl, won the 2011 Moto2 World Championship.

== Motorcycle Grand Prix Results ==
Points system from 1969 to 1987:

**Position**	1	2	3	4	5	6	7	8	9	10
**Points**	15	12	10	8	6	5	4	3	2	1

Points system from 1988 to 1992:

**Position**	1	2	3	4	5	6	7	8	9	10	11	12	13	14	15
**Points**	20	17	15	13	11	10	9	8	7	6	5	4	3	2	1

Points system from 1993 onwards:

**Position**	1	2	3	4	5	6	7	8	9	10	11	12	13	14	15
**Points**	25	20	16	13	11	10	9	8	7	6	5	4	3	2	1

(key) (Races in bold indicate pole position; races in italics indicate fastest lap)

Year	Class	Team	1	2	3	4	5	6	7	8	9	10	11	12	13	14	15	Points	Rank	Wins
1986	250cc	Honda	ESP -	NAT -	GER -	AUT -	YUG; 23	NED -	BEL -	FRA -	GBR -	SWE -	RSM -					0	-	0
1987	250cc	Honda	JPN -	ESP -	GER; 14	NAT -	AUT; 21	YUG -	NED -	FRA -	GBR -	SWE -	CZE -	RSM -	POR -	BRA -	ARG -	0	-	0
1988	250cc	Honda	JPN; NC	USA; 21	ESP; NC	EXP -	NAT; NC	GER; 10	AUT; 21	NED; 20	BEL; 14	YUG; NC	FRA; 17	GBR -	SWE; 11	CZE; 12	BRA; 6	27	17th	0
1989	250cc	HB-Honda	JPN; 12	AUS; 8	USA; NC	ESP; NC	NAT; 10	**GER**; 4	AUT; 4	YUG; NC	NED; NC	BEL; 6	FRA; 10	GBR; 7	SWE; NC	CZE; 5	BRA; 8	88	9th	0
1990	250cc	HB-Honda	JPN; NC	USA; 7	**ESP**; 3	NAT; 2	GER; 4	AUT; 6	YUG; 5	NED -	BEL -	FRA -	GBR; 3	SWE; 5	**CZE**; 3	HUN; 2	AUS; 2	150	4th	0
1991	250cc	HB-Honda	JPN; 7	AUS; 2	USA; 8	**ESP**; 1	**ITA**; 2	**GER**; 1	**AUT**; 1	EUR; 2	NED; 4	**FRA**; 2	GBR; 3	**RSM**; NC	**CZE**; 1	VDM; 1	MAL; 3	220	2nd	5
1992	250cc	HB-Honda	JPN; 4	**AUS**; 3	MAL; NC	ESP; 2	ITA; 4	EUR; 4	GER; NC	NED; 7	HUN; 6	FRA; NC	GBR; 6	BRA; 6	**RSA**; 4			89	4th	0
1993	250cc	HB-Honda	AUS; 8	MAL; 6	JPN; 6	ESP; 5	AUT; 3	GER; 3	NED; 5	EUR; 11	RSM; 7	GBR; NC	CZE; 7	ITA; 4	USA; 8	FIM; NC		126	7th	0
