= 1990 Grand Prix motorcycle racing season =

Sports season

1990 F.I.M. Grand Prix motorcycle racing season

Seasons
- ← 1989 1991 →

1990 World Champions

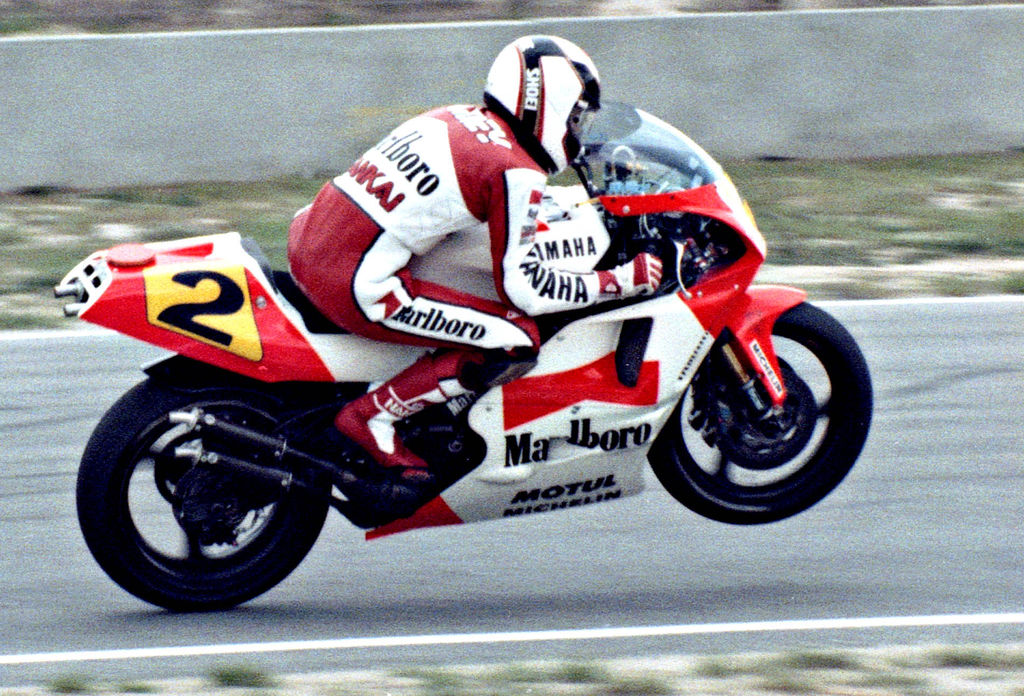
Wayne Rainey (pictured at Laguna Seca) became the 500cc world champion

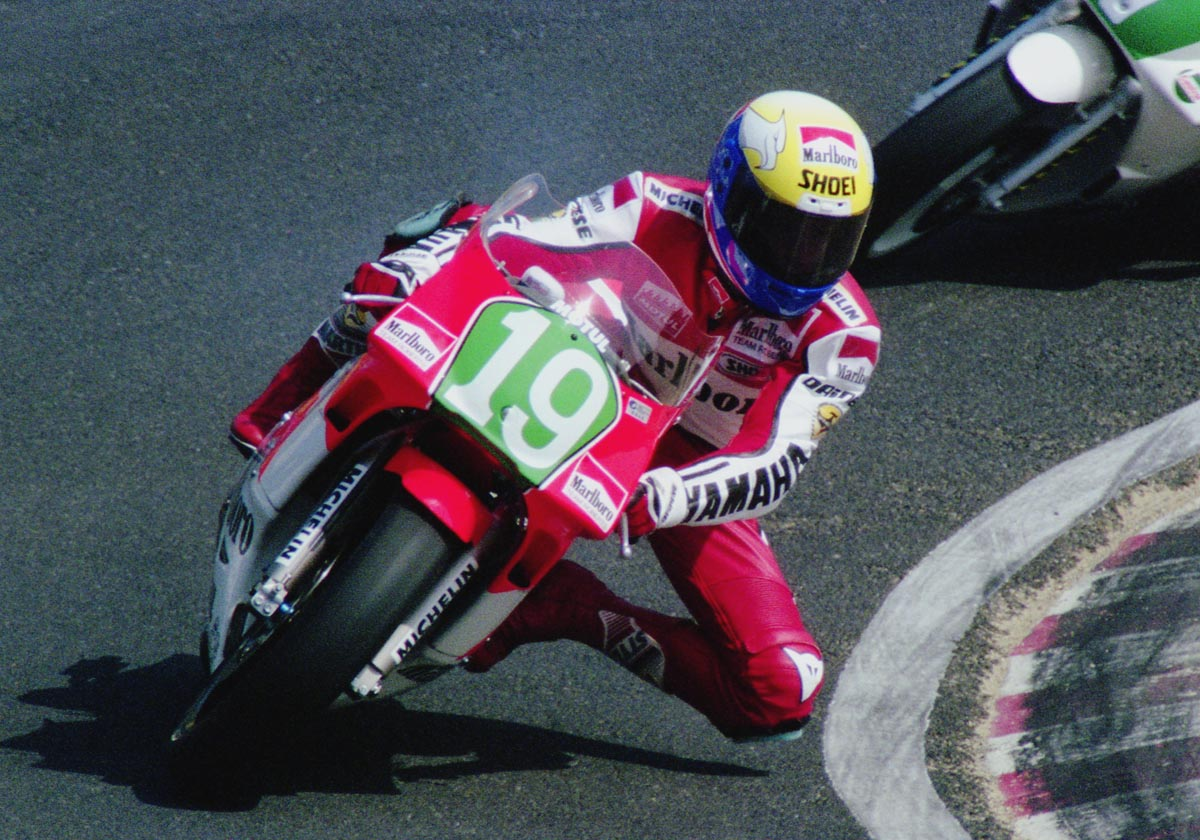
John Kocinski (pictured at Suzuka) became the 250cc world champion

The 1990 Grand Prix motorcycle racing season was the 42nd F.I.M. Road Racing World Championship season.

== Season summary ==
1990 marked the beginning of the Rainey era with the Marlboro-Yamaha rider taking 7 wins and scoring points in every race but Hungary after he had already clinched the championship. Rainey's teammate was 1989 champion Eddie Lawson, but he was unable to defend his championship after breaking his left ankle in the first round and then severely shattering his right ankle the following round at Laguna Seca. Rainey on having Lawson as a teammate: “I just wanted to devastate Eddie. I don’t think he was ready for a team-mate like me. Maybe he thought he could control me, but at that stage I was past being controlled.” Rainey switched from Dunlop to Michelin tires this year.

Kevin Schwantz continued to win on his Suzuki but just as often he would crash. Australian Mick Doohan would win his first Grand Prix for Honda at the Hungaroring.

The 1990 season continued the trend of crashes as riders tried to cope with the harsh power output of the V4 two-strokes. Honda put forth a proposition limiting the top class to 375cc and 3 cylinders, but that never caught on. Still, with 500cc lap times becoming stagnant, it was clear that something needed to be done.

Newcomer John Kocinski took the 250 title for Kenny Roberts' Marlboro-Yamaha squad after a tight points battle with Carlos Cardús that was not decided until the final race of the season. Despite five Grand Prix victories for Hans Spaan, seventeen-year-old Loris Capirossi became the youngest-ever world champion when he claimed the 125 crown for Honda.

== 1990 Grand Prix season calendar ==
The following Grands Prix were scheduled to take place in 1990:

Round	Date	Grand Prix	Circuit
1	25 March	(Japan) Kibun Japanese Grand Prix	Suzuka Circuit
2	8 April	(United States) U.S. Budweiser International Grand Prix	Laguna Seca Raceway
3	6 May	(Spain) Gran Premio de España	Circuito Permanente de Jerez
4	20 May	(Italy) G.P d'Italia	Circuito Internazionale Santa Monica
5	27 May	(Germany) Großer Preis von Deutschland	Nürburgring
6	10 June	(Austria) Großer Preis von Österreich	Salzburgring
7	17 June	(Socialist Federal Republic of Yugoslavia) Yu Grand Prix	Automotodrom Rijeka
8	30 June	(Netherlands) Dutch TT	TT Circuit Assen
9	7 July	(Belgium) Belgian Motorcycle Grand Prix	Circuit de Spa-Francorchamps
10	22 July	Grand Prix de France	Bugatti Circuit
11	5 August	(United Kingdom) Shell British Motorcycle Grand Prix	Donington Park
12	12 August	(Sweden) Nordic TT	Scandinavian Raceway
13	26 August	(Czechoslovakia) Grand Prix Brno-CSFR	Brno Circuit
14	2 September	(Hungary) Grand Prix Magyar Nagydíj	Hungaroring
15	16 September	(Australia) Drink/Drive Australian Motorcycle Grand Prix	Phillip Island Grand Prix Circuit

=== Calendar changes ===
- The Australian Grand Prix was moved back from 9 April to 16 September.
- The German Grand Prix moved from the Hockenheimring to the Nürburgring.
- The Hungarian Grand Prix was added to the calendar.
- The Brazilian Grand Prix was taken off the calendar due to organisational problems.

== Participants ==
=== 500cc participants ===
Team	Constructor	Motorcycle	No.	Rider	Rounds
Marlboro Team Roberts	Yamaha	Yamaha YZR500	1	(United States) Eddie Lawson	1, 8–15
Marlboro Team Roberts	Yamaha	Yamaha YZR500	2	(United States) Wayne Rainey	All
Marlboro Team Roberts	Yamaha	Yamaha YZR500	38	(Australia) Peter Goddard	15
Gauloises Blondes Yamaha/Mobil 1	Yamaha	Yamaha YZR500	3	(France) Christian Sarron	1–3, 5–6, 8–11, 13–15
Gauloises Blondes Yamaha/Mobil 1	Yamaha	Yamaha YZR500	14	(France) Jean-Philippe Ruggia	All
Team Lucky Strike Suzuki	Suzuki	Suzuki RGV500	4	(Australia) Kevin Magee	1–2
Team Lucky Strike Suzuki	Suzuki	Suzuki RGV500	7	(United Kingdom) Niall Mackenzie	3–15
Team Lucky Strike Suzuki	Suzuki	Suzuki RGV500	34	(United States) Kevin Schwantz	All
Team Suzuki	Suzuki	Suzuki RGV500	40	(Japan) Satoshi Tsujimoto	1
La Cinq/ROC	Honda	Honda NSR500	5	(Italy) Pierfrancesco Chili	1–8, 15
La Cinq/ROC	Honda	Honda NSR500	55	(Italy) Marco Papa	9–10
La Cinq/ROC	Honda	Honda NSR500	55	(United Kingdom) Carl Fogarty	11–14
Campsa Banesto	Honda	Honda NSR500	6	(Spain) Sito Pons	1–7, 13–15
Cagiva Corse	Cagiva	Cagiva C590	8	(United Kingdom) Ron Haslam	1–2, 6–14
Cagiva Corse	Cagiva	Cagiva C590	18	(United States) Randy Mamola	1–2, 4–14
Cagiva Corse	Cagiva	Cagiva C590	28	(Brazil) Alex Barros	1–14
Rothmans Honda	Honda	Honda NSR500	9	(Australia) Mick Doohan	All
Rothmans Honda	Honda	Honda NSR500	10	(Australia) Wayne Gardner	1–4, 8–15
Ducados Yamaha Team	Yamaha	Yamaha YZR500	11	(Spain) Joan Garriga	All
Yamaha Motor Company Motorsports	Yamaha	Yamaha YZR500	15	(Japan) Norihiko Fujiwara	1, 8–9
Tech 21/Yamaha Motor Company	Yamaha	Yamaha YZR500	21	(Japan) Tadahiko Taira	1, 15
Honda Sweden	Honda	Honda RS500	17	(Sweden) Peter Lindén	4–5, 12
Autohaus Butz	Honda	Honda RS500	19	(West Germany) Hansjörg Butz	3, 5
RS Rallye Sport Team GmbH	Honda	Honda RS500	20	(West Germany) Michael Rudroff	??
RS Rallye Sport	Honda	Honda RS500	32; 35; 42	(West Germany) Alois Meyer	0 (5–6)
Sampo	Honda	Honda RS500	23	(Finland) Esko Kuparinen	8, 12
Millar Racing	Honda	Honda RS500	24; 54	(Republic of Ireland) Eddie Laycock	3, 8–11, 13–15
Librenti Corse	Honda	Honda RS500	25	(Luxembourg) Andy Leuthe	3–5, 11–14
FMS/N Schmassmann	Honda	Honda RS500	26	(Switzerland) Niggi Schmassman	2–5, 7–8
Levior	Honda	Honda RS500	30	(West Germany) Martin Trösch	10, 13–14
Motoclub Perugia	Honda	Honda RS500	31; 37; 38	(Italy) Marco Papa	4–8, 11–15
Shell	Honda	Honda RS500	33; 35; 36; 43	(Austria) Karl Truchsess	6–10, 14
Ys Racing	Honda	Honda NSR500	35	(Japan) Shunji Yatsushiro	0 (1)
Team Elit Paton	Paton	Paton V115 500	35; 42; 37	(Italy) Vittorio Scatola	3–5, 7–10
Nescafé	Yamaha	Yamaha YZR500	36	(Japan) Kunio Machii	1
Teera	Honda	Honda NSR500	37	(Japan) Hikaru Miyagi	1
Schick Advantage	Suzuki	Suzuki RGV500	38	(Japan) Osamu Hiwatashi	1
HRC/Pentax	Honda	Honda NSR500	39	(Japan) Shinichi Ito	1
Avia	Honda	Honda RS500	39	(Italy) Michele Valdo	4
UCC	Yamaha	Yamaha YZR500	41	(Japan) Shinji Katayama	1
HRK Motors	Honda	Honda RS500	40; 41; 36	(Netherlands) Cees Doorakkers	3–15
Camel	Yamaha	Yamaha YZR500	43	(Japan) Keiji Ohishi	1
??	Chevallier-Honda	Honda RS500	43	(France) Rachel Nicotte	10, 13–14
Meikoh	Honda	Honda NS500	44	(Japan) Kenmei Matsumoto	0 (1)
??	??	??	??	(Chile) Vincenzo Cascino	??
??	PRP	??	??	(Australia) Greg Drew	0 (15)
??	Yamaha	Yamaha YZR500	??	(Australia) Craig Harwood	0 (15)
??	Suzuki	Suzuki RGV500	??	(Australia) Scott Mitchell	0 (15)

Key
Regular Rider
Wildcard Rider
Replacement Rider

=== 250cc participants ===
Team	Constructor	Motorcycle	No.	Rider	Rounds
HB Honda Team	Honda	Honda NSR250	2	(West Germany) Reinhold Roth	1–2, 4–7
HB Honda Team	Honda	Honda NSR250	9	(West Germany) Helmut Bradl	1–7, 11–15
HB Honda Team	Honda	Honda NSR250	16	(West Germany) Jochen Schmid	All
HB Honda Team	Honda	Honda NSR250	41	(West Germany) Bernd Kassner	14
Team Lucky Strike Elf	Honda	Honda NSR250	3	(Switzerland) Jacques Cornu	1, 6–15
Team Lucky Strike Elf	Honda	Honda NSR250	16	(West Germany) Jochen Schmid	All
Repsol Honda	Honda	Honda NSR250	4	(Spain) Carlos Cardús	All
Marlboro Yamaha Team Agostini	Yamaha	Yamaha YZR 250	5	(Italy) Luca Cadalora	All
Marlboro Yamaha Team Agostini	Yamaha	Yamaha YZR 250	28	(Spain) Àlex Crivillé	2–15
Ajinomoto Honda/HRC	Honda	Honda NSR250	6	(Japan) Masahiro Shimizu	All
Castrol Mortimer Racing	Yamaha	Yamaha TZ 250	7	(United Kingdom) Niall Mackenzie	1–2
Rothmans Honda	Honda	Honda NSR250	8	(France) Dominique Sarron	1–4, 6, 10–15
Rothmans Honda	Honda	Honda NSR250	34; 39; 35	(Austria) Andy Preining	1–4, 6–15
Hein Gericke Racing Team	Aprilia	Aprilia AF1	10	(West Germany) Martin Wimmer	2–15
HB Gallina Aprilia Team	Aprilia	Aprilia AF1	11	(Italy) Loris Reggiani	All
Honda Britain	Honda	Honda RS250R	12	(United Kingdom) Alan Carter	1–2, 10–11
Sharp-Samson Racing Team	Honda	Honda NSR250	14	(United Kingdom) Alan Carter	1–6, 8–15
UCC	Yamaha	Yamaha YZR 250	15	(Japan) Toshihiko Honma	1
Team AGV HB	Honda	Honda RS250R	16	(West Germany) Jochen Schmid	All
Team Greco	Aprilia	Aprilia AF1	17	(Venezuela) Carlos Lavado	1–10
Team Greco	Aprilia	Aprilia AF1	29	(Italy) Renzo Colleoni	2–15
Marlboro Team Roberts	Yamaha	Yamaha YZR 250	19	(United States) John Kocinski	All
Marlboro Team Roberts	Yamaha	Yamaha TZ 250	97	(United States) Rich Oliver	2
AMS Racing Team	Aprilia	Aprilia AF1	20	(Italy) Andrea Borgonovo	1–12
Aprilia	Aprilia-Rotax	Aprilia AF1	21	(Italy) Marcellino Lucchi	3–11, 13–15
GP Trade & Promotion	Yamaha	Yamaha TZ 250	22	(Austria) Erich Neumair	1–8, 10–14
Gauloises Blondes	Aprilia	Aprilia AF1	23	(France) Adrien Morillas	3–14
??	Honda	Honda NSR250	26	(Japan) Tadayuki Okada	1
Iberna/Team Motoracing	Aprilia	Aprilia AF1	27	(Belgium) Didier de Radiguès	1, 3–15
Venemotos Racing Team	Yamaha	Yamaha TZ 250	30	(Venezuela) José Barresi	1, 3–14
Ducados Yamaha Puig	Yamaha	Yamaha TZ 250; Yamaha YZR 250	31	(Spain) Alberto Puig	6–13
JF Aprilia - Kuhnert	Aprilia	Aprilia AF1	32	(West Germany) Harald Eckl	1–2, 4–14
ÖKM/SK Vöst	Aprilia-Rotax	Aprilia AF1	34; 39; 35	(Austria) Andy Preining	1–4, 6–15
Moto Club Bergamo	Aprilia	Aprilia AF1	34; 45	(Italy) Alberto Rota	3–7, 10–12
Plaisir Vitesse International	Various	Various	35; 47	(France) Rachel Nicotte	10, 13–14
Team St Yrian Motos	Yamaha	Yamaha TZ 250	36; 41	(France) Jean Foray	3–11, 13–14
Team Italia	Aprilia	Aprilia AF1	37	(Italy) Corrado Catalano	3–4, 7–10, 13
Marlboro Aprilia Team Elf	Aprilia	Aprilia AF1	38; 39	(Switzerland) Bernard Haenggeli	2–15
HRC	Honda	Honda NSR250	38	(Australia) Daryl Beattie	15
D Gallacher/B & M Motorcycles	Yamaha	Yamaha TZ 250	39; 40; 36	(United Kingdom) Kevin Mitchell	1, 3, 5–13
Swiss Yamaha Team	Yamaha	Yamaha TZ 250	39; 33	(Switzerland) Urs Jücker	2–15
HB Team Racing	Yamaha	Yamaha TZ 250; Yamaha YZR 250	40	(West Germany) Bernd Kassner	4–11
??	Yamaha	Yamaha TZ 250	44	(Japan) Tetsuya Harada	1
Romero Racing Team	Yamaha	Yamaha TZ 250	45; 34	(West Germany) Hans Becker	2, 5–11, 13
Cup Noodle Racing Team	Honda	Honda NSR250	47	(Japan) Nobuatsu Aoki	1
Moto Club Crostolo	Yamaha	Yamaha TZ 250	48; 42	(Italy) Paolo Casoli	3–14
Fior Racing	Aprilia-Fior	Aprilia AF1	49; 44	(France) Alain Bronec	3–4, 7–10
Ducados JJ Cobas	JJ Cobas-Rotax	??	55	(Spain) Jorge Martínez	1–6, 8–15

Key
Regular Rider
Wildcard Rider
Replacement Rider

=== 125cc participants ===
Team	Constructor	Motorcycle	No.	Rider	Rounds
Sharp-Samson Racing Team	Honda	Honda RS125R	2	(Netherlands) Hans Spaan	1, 3–14
Nacional Moto SA - Derbi	Derbi	Aprilia AF1	3	(Italy) Ezio Gianola	1
Nacional Moto SA - Derbi	Derbi	Aprilia AF1	38	(Spain) Luis Alvaro	1, 9–11
Team Unemoto	Honda	Honda RS125R	4	(Japan) Hisashi Unemoto	1, 3–6, 8–15
AGV Pileri Corse	Honda	Honda RS125R	5	(Italy) Fausto Gresini	1, 3–4, 6–15
AGV Pileri Corse	Honda	Honda RS125R	65; 48; 67; 75; 47; 59	(Italy) Loris Capirossi	1, 3–15
Team Takeshima	Honda	Honda RS125R	6	(Japan) Koji Takada	1, 3–4, 15
Team Takeshima	Honda	Honda RS125R	68; 67	(Japan) Kinya Wada	1, 10–15
Lanson Honda Racing	Honda	Honda RS125R	7	(West Germany) Stefan Prein	1, 3–15
Coronas Racing Team	JJ Cobas	??	8	(Spain) Julián Miralles	1, 3–15
Allan Scott Racing	Honda	Honda RS125R	10; 9	(United States) Allan Scott	1, 3, 6–7, 11–12, 14–15
Garelli	Garelli	Garelli 125 GP	10; 9	(United States) Allan Scott	1, 3, 6–7, 11–12, 14–15
Garelli	Garelli	Garelli 125 GP	14	(Spain) Luis Miguel Reyes	10–13
RS Rallye Sport Racing Team	Cobas-Rotax	Rotax 125 GP	11	(West Germany) Adi Stadler	1, 3–13
RS Rallye Sport Racing Team	Cobas-Rotax	Rotax 125 GP	24	(West Germany) Peter Öttl	6, 8–9, 13
Robin Milton	Honda	Honda RS125R	12	(United Kingdom) Robin Milton	1, 3–4, 6–13, 15
AMC Biberach/Riss e.V im ADAC	Honda	Honda RS125R	16	(West Germany) Dirk Raudies	1, 3–15
Gerstmann Racing	Honda	Honda RS125R	17	(West Germany) Alfred Waibel	3–15
Team Rumi	Honda	Honda RS125R	18	(Finland) Taru Rinne	1, 8, 13–15
Moto Club Crostolo	Honda	Honda RS125R	20	(Italy) Doriano Romboni	3–15
Marlboro Aprilia Team Dörflinger	Aprilia-Cobas	Aprilia AF1	21	(Switzerland) Stefan Dörflinger	1, 3, 5–6, 9, 13–14
Cepsa	JJ Cobas TB	??	22	(Spain) Manuel Herreros	1, 4–14
Semprucci/Club del Motore-Forli	Honda	Honda RS125R	23	(Italy) Bruno Casanova	3–11, 13–15
Repsol Honda	Honda	Honda RS125R	25	(Spain) Herri Torrontégui	3, 5–6, 10–14
Antonio Sánchez Ballesteros	JJ Cobas TB	??	29	(Spain) Antonio Sánchez	3, 6, 8–12, 14
Viplex Plastics Holland	Honda	Honda RS125R	30	(Netherlands) Hans Koopman	3–14
Schuh Racing Team	Cobas-Rotax	Rotax 125 GP	31	(West Germany) Ralf Waldmann	3–15
José Saez Calabuig	Honda	Honda RS125R	32	(Spain) José Saez	3–4
Timspeed Casal	Various	Various	33	(Spain) Jaime Mariano	5, 8–12
Ringelberg Team	Honda	Honda RS125R	34	(Netherlands) Jos van Dongen	3–5, 7, 9, 14
Stefan Kurfiss	Honda	Honda RS125R	36	(West Germany) Stefan Kurfiss	3–11, 14–15
Team Italia	Aprilia	Aprilia AF1	37	(Italy) Gabriele Debbia	4–15
Team Italia	Aprilia	Aprilia AF1	39	(Italy) Alessandro Gramigni	3–15
Team Driza Bone	Honda	Honda RS125R	40	(Australia) Peter Galvin	1, 5, 7–9, 12, 14–15
Thomas Moller Pedersen	Honda	Honda RS125R	42	(Denmark) Flemming Kistrup	3–6, 8–14
Colin Appleyard Ltd	Honda	Honda RS125R	43; 47	(United Kingdom) Robin Appleyard	1, 3–15
BP Racing Team Switzerland	Honda	Honda RS125R	45	(Switzerland) Thierry Feuz	1, 3–7, 9, 13
Silja Line	Honda/Cobas	Honda RS125R	46	(Finland) Johnny Wickström	1, 3–15
Hervé Duffard	Honda	Honda RS125R	49; 62	(France) Hervé Duffard	3–5, 10–11, 13
Derek Clarke Racing Team	Honda	Honda RS125R	50; 54; 63	(United Kingdom) Steve Patrickson	1, 3–5, 7–8, 11–15
Stuart Edwards	Honda	Honda RS125R	51; 52; 64	(United Kingdom) Stuart Edwards	1, 5, 8–10
Gazzaniga Corse	Gazzaniga	Gazzaniga 125	52; 51; 59	(Italy) Maurizio Vitali	1, 3–15
Mori Sport Laverda	Various	Various	53; 57	(Switzerland) Stefan Brägger	12–15
Team Lucky Strike Elf	Honda	Honda RS125R	54; 64; 66	(Switzerland) Heinz Lüthi	3–15
Ducados JJ Cobas	JJ Cobas-Rotax	Rotax 125 GP	55	(Spain) Jorge Martínez	1, 3–15
Digitec	Honda	Honda RS125R	56; 65; 49	(Algeria) Bady Hassaine	1, 5–7, 9–10, 14
Team Honda Liqor 43	Honda	Honda RS125R	57; 63; 43; 55	(Spain) Manuel Hernández	1, 3–12, 14–15
EMCO Sports Team	Honda	Honda RS125R	60; 48	(Austria) Mike Leitner	3–8, 10–13
Hubert Abold	Honda	Honda RS125R	61; 53	(West Germany) Hubert Abold	3–10, 12, 14–15
T. C. Winchester Racing Team	Honda	Honda RS125R	61	(Italy) Emilio Cuppini	4–6
Moto Club Biccirelli	Honda	Honda RS125R	66	(Italy) Emilio Cuppini	8–14

Key
Regular Rider
Wildcard Rider
Replacement Rider

== Results and standings ==
=== Grands Prix ===
Round	Date	Race	Location	125cc winner	250cc winner	500cc winner	Report
1	25 March	(Japan) Japanese Grand Prix	Suzuka	(Netherlands) Hans Spaan	(Italy) Luca Cadalora	(United States) Wayne Rainey	Report
2	8 April	United States Grand Prix	Laguna Seca		(United States) John Kocinski	(United States) Wayne Rainey	Report
3	6 May	(Spain) Spanish Grand Prix	Jerez	(Spain) Jorge Martínez	(United States) John Kocinski	(Australia) Wayne Gardner	Report
4	20 May	(Italy) Nations Grand Prix	Misano	(Spain) Jorge Martínez	(United States) John Kocinski	(United States) Wayne Rainey	Report
5	27 May	(Germany) German Grand Prix	Nürburgring	(Italy) Doriano Romboni	(Netherlands) Wilco Zeelenberg	(United States) Kevin Schwantz	Report
6	10 June	(Austria) Austrian Grand Prix	Salzburgring	(Spain) Jorge Martínez	(Italy) Luca Cadalora	(United States) Kevin Schwantz	Report
7	17 June	(Socialist Federal Republic of Yugoslavia) Yugoslavian Grand Prix	Rijeka	(West Germany) Stefan Prein	(Spain) Carlos Cardús	(United States) Wayne Rainey	Report
8	30 June	(Netherlands) Dutch TT	Assen	(Italy) Doriano Romboni	(United States) John Kocinski	(United States) Kevin Schwantz	Report
9	7 July	(Belgium) Belgian Grand Prix	Spa	(Netherlands) Hans Spaan	(United States) John Kocinski	(United States) Wayne Rainey	Report
10	22 July	(France) French Grand Prix	Le Mans	(Netherlands) Hans Spaan	(Spain) Carlos Cardús	(United States) Kevin Schwantz	Report
11	5 August	(United Kingdom) British Grand Prix	Donington	(Italy) Loris Capirossi	(Italy) Luca Cadalora	(United States) Kevin Schwantz	Report
12	12 August	(Sweden) Swedish Grand Prix	Anderstorp	(Netherlands) Hans Spaan	(Spain) Carlos Cardús	(United States) Wayne Rainey	Report
13	26 August	(Czechoslovakia) Czechoslovak Grand Prix	Brno	(Netherlands) Hans Spaan	(Spain) Carlos Cardús	(United States) Wayne Rainey	Report
14	2 September	(Hungary) Hungarian Grand Prix	Hungaroring	(Italy) Loris Capirossi	(United States) John Kocinski	(Australia) Mick Doohan	Report
15	16 September	(Australia) Australian Grand Prix	Phillip Island	(Italy) Loris Capirossi	(United States) John Kocinski	(Australia) Wayne Gardner	Report

=== 500cc riders' standings ===
Scoring system

Points are awarded to the top fifteen finishers. A rider has to finish the race to earn points.

Position	**1st**	**2nd**	**3rd**	**4th**	**5th**	**6th**	**7th**	**8th**	**9th**	**10th**	**11th**	**12th**	**13th**	**14th**	**15th**
Points	20	17	15	13	11	10	9	8	7	6	5	4	3	2	1

Pos	Rider	Bike	JPN (Japan)	USA (United States)	ESP (Spain)	NAT (Italy)	GER (Germany)	AUT (Austria)	YUG (Socialist Federal Republic of Yugoslavia)	NED (Netherlands)	BEL (Belgium)	FRA (France)	GBR (United Kingdom)	SWE (Sweden)	TCH (Czechoslovakia)	HUN (Hungary)	AUS (Australia)	Pts
1	(United States) Wayne Rainey	Yamaha	**1**	1	2	**1**	2	2	**1**	2	1	3	2	1	1	Ret	3	255
2	(United States) Kevin Schwantz	Suzuki	3	Ret	3	2	**1**	**1**	2	**1**	**7**	**1**	1	**Ret**	**Ret**	3	Ret	188
3	(Australia) Mick Doohan	Honda	Ret	2	**4**	3	Ret	3	4	4	6	4	4	4	9	**1**	**2**	179
4	(United Kingdom) Niall Mackenzie	Suzuki			8	5	3	5	3	5	12	6	5	5	4	7	5	140
5	(Australia) Wayne Gardner	Honda	2	**Ret**	1	4				Ret	10	2	**Ret**	3	2	4	1	138
6	(Spain) Juan Garriga	Yamaha	10	6	9	8	7	9	Ret	6	9	8	7	8	5	5	6	121
7	(United States) Eddie Lawson	Yamaha	Ret							3	3	5	3	2	3	2	4	118
8	(France) Jean-Philippe Ruggia	Yamaha	8	5	10	Ret	6	8	5	11	2	Ret	9	7	8	6	Ret	110
9	(France) Christian Sarron	Yamaha	Ret	4	7		4	7		7	4	Ret	8		6	Ret	Ret	84
10	(Spain) Sito Pons	Honda	5	Ret	6	6	5	6	Ret						7	10	7	76
11	(Italy) Pierfrancesco Chili	Honda	7	3	5	Ret	Ret	4	Ret	8							9	63
12	(Brazil) Alex Barros	Cagiva	Ret	8	Ret	Ret	8	11	Ret	10	5	Ret	11	9	Ret	9		57
13	(Italy) Marco Papa	Honda				9	11	13	6	14	Ret	9	13	11	13	12	10	55
14	(United States) Randy Mamola	Cagiva	Ret	7		7	9	10	Ret	18	Ret	7	6	Ret	11	Ret		55
15	(United Kingdom) Ron Haslam	Cagiva	Ret	Ret	DNQ	DNQ	DNQ	12	DNS	9	8	10	10	10	12	11		46
16	(Netherlands) Cees Doorakkers	Honda			13	14	10	14	7	13	15	12	Ret	12	16	16	12	38
17	(Republic of Ireland) Eddie Laycock	Honda			11					12	13	11	12		14	14	11	30
18	(United Kingdom) Carl Fogarty	Honda											Ret	6	10	8		24
19	(Switzerland) Niggi Schmassman	Honda		10	12	13	13		9	16								23
20	(Sweden) Peter Linden	Honda		9		12	15							13				15
21	(Australia) Kevin Magee	Suzuki	4	Ret														13
22	(Austria) Karl Truchsess	Honda						15	8	15	14	Ret				Ret		12
23	(Japan) Tadahiko Taira	Yamaha	6														Ret	10
24	(Australia) Peter Goddard	Yamaha															8	8
25	(Luxembourg) Andreas Leuthe	Honda			14	Ret	12						14	Ret	Ret	Ret		8
26	(Japan) Shinichi Ito	Honda	9															7
27	(Italy) Romolo Balbi	Honda				10												6
28	(Italy) Michele Valdo	Honda				11												5
29	(Japan) Hikaru Miyagi	Honda	11															5
30	(Japan) Norihiko Fujiwara	Honda	Ret							Ret	11							5
31	(Japan) Shinji Katayama	Yamaha	12															4
32	(France) Rachel Nicotte	Honda										Ret			15	13		4
33	(Japan) Osamu Hiwatashi	Suzuki	13															3
34	(Germany) Hansjörg Butz	Honda			15		14											3
35	(Germany) Martin Trösch	Honda										Ret			17	15		1
36	(Italy) Vittorio Scatola	Paton			Ret	15	16		Ret	Ret	DNS	Ret						1
Pos	Rider	Bike	JPN (Japan)	USA (United States)	ESP (Spain)	NAT (Italy)	GER (Germany)	AUT (Austria)	YUG (Socialist Federal Republic of Yugoslavia)	NED (Netherlands)	BEL (Belgium)	FRA (France)	GBR (United Kingdom)	SWE (Sweden)	TCH (Czechoslovakia)	HUN (Hungary)	AUS (Australia)	Pts

Colour	Result
Gold	Winner
Silver	Second place
Bronze	Third place
Green	Points classification
Blue	Non-points classification
Blue	Non-classified finish (NC)
Purple	Retired, not classified (Ret)
Red	Did not qualify (DNQ)
Red	Did not pre-qualify (DNPQ)
Black	Disqualified (DSQ)
White	Did not start (DNS)
White	Withdrew (WD)
White	Race cancelled (C)
Blank	Did not practice (DNP)
Blank	Did not arrive (DNA)
Blank	Excluded (EX)

**Bold** – Pole Position

=== 250cc standings ===
Place	Rider	Country	Team	Machine	Points	Wins
1	(United States) John Kocinski	United States	Marlboro-Yamaha Roberts	YZR250	223	7
2	(Spain) Carlos Cardús	Spain	Repsol-Honda	NSR250	208	4
3	(Italy) Luca Cadalora	Italy	Marlboro-Yamaha Agostini	YZR250	184	3
4	(West Germany) Helmut Bradl	Germany	HB-Honda	NSR250	150	0
5	(Netherlands) Wilco Zeelenberg	Netherlands	Sharp-Samson Honda	NSR250	127	1
6	(West Germany) Martin Wimmer	Germany	Hein Gericke Aprilia	RS250	118	0
7	(Japan) Masahiro Shimizu	Japan	Ajinomoto-Honda	NSR250	100	0
8	(West Germany) Jochen Schmid	Germany	HB-Honda	NSR250	92	0
9	(Switzerland) Jacques Cornu	Switzerland	Lucky Strike-Elf Honda	NSR250	86	0
10	(France) Dominique Sarron	France	Rothmans-Honda	NSR250	78	0
11	(Spain) Àlex Crivillé	Spain	Yamaha	YZR250	76	0
12	(Belgium) Didier de Radiguès	Belgium	Aprilia	RS250	66	0
13	(Italy) Loris Reggiani	Italy	Aprilia	RS250	63	0
14	(Germany) Reinhold Roth	Germany	Honda	NSR250	52	0
15	(Venezuela) Carlos Lavado	Venezuela	Aprilia	RS250	37	0
16	(Spain) Alberto Puig	Spain	Yamaha	YZR250	32	0
17	(Italy) Paolo Casoli	Italy	Yamaha	YZR250	32	0
18	(Austria) Andy Preining	Austria	Aprilia	RS250	30	0
19	(Italy) Marcellino Lucchi	Italy	Aprilia	RS250	23	0
20	(Spain) Adrien Morillas	Spain	Aprilia	RS250	22	0
21	(Italy) Renzo Colleoni	Italy	Aprilia	RS250	17	0
22	(Australia) Daryl Beattie	Australia	Honda	NSR250	13	0
23	(Austria) Harald Eckl	Austria	Aprilia	RS250	13	0
24	(Spain) Jorge Martínez	Spain	JJ Cobas	JJ-Cobas 250GP	13	0
25	(Japan) Toshihiko Honma	Japan	Yamaha	YZR250	10	0
26	(Italy) Corrado Catalano	Italy	Aprilia	RS250	10	0
27	(Japan) Tetsuya Harada	Japan	Yamaha	YZR250	9	0
28	(Italy) Andrea Borgonovo	Italy	Aprilia	RS250	9	0
29	(Japan) Nobuatsu Aoki	Japan	Honda	NSR250	8	0
30	(Italy) Alberto Rota	Italy	Aprilia	RS250	8	0
31	(Japan) Masumitsu Taguchi	Japan	Honda	NSR250	7	0
32	(Japan) Tsutomu Udagawa	Japan	Honda	NSR250	6	0
33	(United Kingdom) Niall Mackenzie	Great Britain	Yamaha	YZR250	5	0
34	(France) Jean Pierre Jeandat	France	Honda	NSR250	4	0
35	(Japan) Junzo Suzuki	Japan	Honda	NSR250	4	0
36	(Germany) Bernd Kassner	Germany	Yamaha	YZR250	4	0
37	(Venezuela) Josè Barresi	Venezuela	Yamaha	YZR250	4	0
38	(Switzerland) Bernard Haenggeli	Switzerland	Aprilia	RS250	4	0
39	(United States) Rich Oliver	United States	Yamaha	YZR250	3	0
40	(United Kingdom) Alan Carter	Great Britain	Honda	NSR250	3	0
41	(United Kingdom) Clive Horton	Great Britain	Yamaha	YZR250	3	0
42	(United Kingdom) Steve Manley	Great Britain	Yamaha	YZR250	2	0
43	(United Kingdom) Kevin Mitchell	Great Britain	Yamaha	YZR250	2	0
44	(Switzerland) Urs Jücker	Switzerland	Yamaha	YZR250	2	0
45	(Japan) Yukio Nukumi	Japan	Yamaha	YZR250	1	0
46	(Australia) Ricky Rice	Australia	Yamaha	YZR250	1	0
47	(France) Jean Foray	France	Yamaha	YZR250	1	0

=== 125cc standings ===
Pos	Rider	Bike	JPN (Japan)	ESP (Spain)	NAT (Italy)	GER (Germany)	AUT (Austria)	YUG (Socialist Federal Republic of Yugoslavia)	NED (Netherlands)	BEL (Belgium)	FRA (France)	GBR (United Kingdom)	SWE (Sweden)	TCH (Czechoslovakia)	HUN (Hungary)	AUS (Australia)	Pts
1	(Italy) Loris Capirossi	Honda	6	7	3	3	2	2	Ret	2	4	1	7	Ret	1	1	182
2	(Netherlands) Hans Spaan	Honda	1	DNS	4	4	12	12	Ret	1	1	3	1	1	5	4	173
3	(Germany) Stefan Prein	Honda	2	2	Ret	5	3	1	6	4	3	5	4	2	6		169
4	(Italy) Doriano Romboni	Honda		Ret	Ret	1	6	5	1	11	2	2	3	Ret	Ret	3	130
5	(Germany) Dirk Raudies	Honda	4	10	2	2	Ret	13	11	6	8	13	8	6	13	6	113
6	(Spain) Jorge Martinez	JJ Cobas	Ret	1	1	Ret	1	Ret	5	Ret	6	4	17	8	Ret	13	105
7	(Italy) Fausto Gresini	Honda	7	3	Ret		Ret	6	8	8	Ret	8	5	7	4	5	102
8	(Italy) Bruno Casanova	Aprilia		Ret	21	Ret	4	3	2	3	Ret	Ret		11	3	2	97
9	(Italy) Alessandro Gramigni	Aprilia		23	22	7	8	9	10	22	9	Ret	2	3	8	9	84
10	(Switzerland) Heinz Lüthi	Honda	DNS	Ret	10	6	20	11	7	Ret	7	Ret	11	5	2	10	78
11	(Germany) Adi Stadler	JJ Cobas	9	9	Ret	9	7	7	3	7	Ret	12	6	Ret			77
12	(Italy) Gabriele Debbia	Aprilia		DNS	12	15	9	Ret	4	15	11	Ret	12	4	9	17	55
13	(Spain) Julian Miralles	JJ Cobas	Ret	6		Ret	10	Ret	Ret	5	20	9	9	DSQ	Ret	11	46
14	(Italy) Maurizio Vitali	Gazzaniga	19	11	9	Ret	28	8	12	12	10	6	29	Ret	Ret	Ret	44
15	(Spain) Manuel Hernández	Honda	17	8	6	10	5	17	17	Ret	12	24	Ret		17	15	40
16	(Japan) Koji Takada	Honda	3	4	5	DNS										26	39
17	(United Kingdom) Steve Patrickson	Honda	15	5	Ret	Ret		Ret	Ret	DNQ	DNQ	7	13	10	14	Ret	32
18	(United Kingdom) Robin Appleyard	Honda	Ret	15	24	17	22	15	14	9	13	18	15	14	10	7	32
19	(Germany) Alfred Waibel	Honda		12	11	12	14	Ret	22	13	Ret	Ret	10	9	Ret	Ret	31
20	(Japan) Hisashi Unemoto	Honda	12	13	8	14	18	Ret	21	16	5	14	16	Ret	18	16	30
21	(United Kingdom) Robin Milton	Honda		Ret	7	DNQ	17	10	Ret	10	Ret	11	18	16		14	28
22	(Japan) Kin'ya Wada	Honda	5								Ret	17	Ret	13	12	8	26
23	(Germany) Ralf Waldmann	Rotax		Ret	25	11	16	4	Ret	Ret	Ret	15	23	Ret	Ret	Ret	19
24	(Italy) Emilio Cuppini	Honda			14	Ret	26	Ret	Ret	17	Ret	Ret	20	12	7		15
25	(Spain) Herri Torrontegui	Honda	DNS	25	DNQ	13	11	DNQ			Ret	10	19	17	Ret		14
26	(Finland) Johnny Wickström	JJ Cobas	18	21	15	8	Ret	14	18	19	16	16	14	18	20	18	13
27	(Germany) Stefan Kurfiss	Honda		Ret	19	21	Ret	16	9	20	18	21	DNQ	DSQ	19	12	11
28	(Japan) Yoshifumi Ichimiya	Honda	8														8
29	(Netherlands) Hans Koopman	Honda		20	18	16	29	18	16	14	17	25		19	11		7
30	(Japan) Yukiho Hinokio	Honda	10														6
31	(Italy) Domenico Brigaglia	Honda			13				13			Ret					6
32	(Japan) Fuyuki Yamazaki	Honda	11														5
33	(Switzerland) Thierry Feuz	Honda	Ret	14	Ret		13	Ret	DNS	Ret	DNS			Ret			5
34	(Japan) Nobuyuki Wakai	Honda	13														3
35	(Denmark) Flemming Kistrup	Honda		16		Ret	21	DNQ	25	Ret	14	19	22	15	21		3
36	(Japan) Sinya Sato	Honda	14														2
37	(United States) Allan Scott	Honda	Ret	Ret	DNQ		15	Ret	DNQ	DNQ	DNQ	Ret	Ret		Ret	Ret	1
38	(Spain) Jaime Mariano	Casal		DNQ	DNQ	Ret	DNQ	DNQ	20	Ret	15	22	Ret				1
39	(Spain) Antonio Sanchez	JJ Cobas		17	DNQ	DNQ	19	DNQ	19	18	Ret	23	24		15		1
40	(United Kingdom) Stuart Edwards	Honda	Ret	DNQ	DNQ	18	DNQ	DNQ	15			DNQ	DNQ				1
