= Aprilia AF1 =

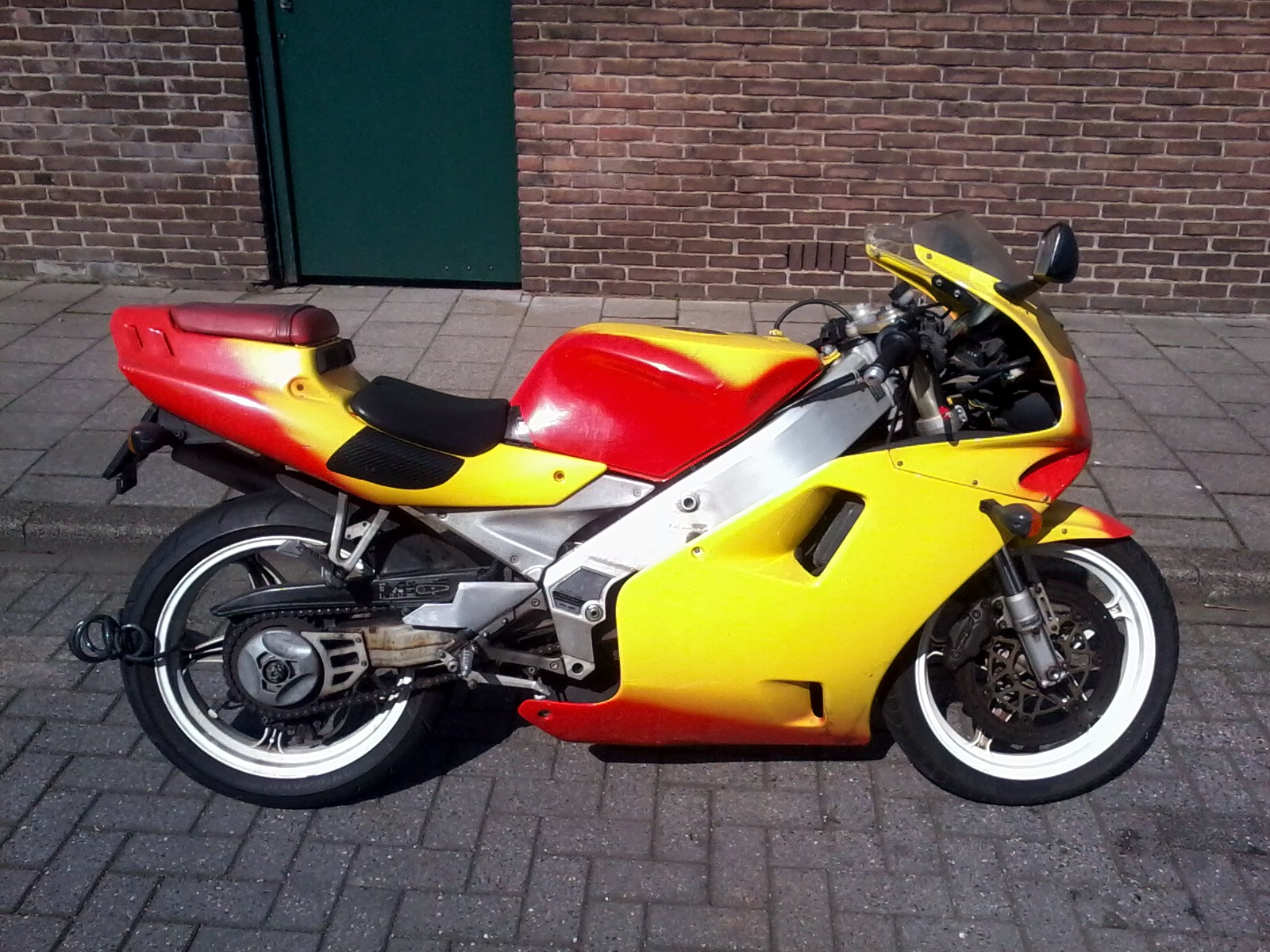
- 1990 Aprilia AF1 125 Futura
- Manufacturer: Aprilia
- Production: 1986-1993
- Predecessor: Aprilia AS125R
- Successor: Aprilia RS 125
- Class: Sports bike
- Engine: two-stroke liquid-cooled 50–125 cc (3.1–7.6 cu in) single-cylinder
- Power: 7.3–10.1 hp (5.4–7.5 kW) (50cc); 26–33 hp (19–25 kW) (125cc)
- Transmission: 3/6-speed, chain final drive
- Suspension: Upside-down telescopic fork (front) mono-shock (rear)
- Brakes: Disc brakes
- Wheelbase: 1,280–1,370 mm (50–54 in)
- Dimensions: L: 1,910–2,040 mm (75–80 in); W: 615–680 mm (24.2–26.8 in); H: 1,100–1,170 mm (43–46 in)
- Seat height: 780–805 mm (30.7–31.7 in)
- Weight: 89 kg (196 lb) (50cc); 135 kg (298 lb) (125cc) (dry)
- Fuel capacity: 3.8–4.23 US gal (14.4–16.0 L)
- Related: Aprilia AF1 250

The Aprilia AF1 is a sports motorcycle, designed, developed and built by Aprilia between 1986 and 1993. It came in two version; 50 cc (3.1 cu in), and 125 cc (7.6 cu in).

== Introduction ==
The peculiarity of this sports model is given by the single-sided swingarm and by the external and not internal positioning of the transmission crown, this allowed a quick replacement, without being forced to remove the wheel, while the brake disc remained internal.

The main competitors were the Cagiva, with the Freccia (C9, C10, C12) first and the Mito, then the Gilera first with the SP, then with the Crono, then the Yamaha with the TZR and the Honda with the NSR.

== Aprilia AF1 50 ==
The Aprilia AF1 50 was released in 1986 and is equipped with a 49.7 cm^{3} 2-stroke liquid-cooled single-cylinder engine with an automatic mixer and 4-speed gearbox.

The engine was a Minarelli RV 3-4 fed by a Dell'Orto SHA 14/12 carburetor, without a balancing shaft and having 4 gears (later the fourth was blocked because by law a moped had to have a maximum number of 3 gears). This bike combined a fairly gritty high-speed engine with a chassis worthy of a racing bike, it had 2 disc brakes, a central pivot telehydraulic fork, a hydraulic mono-shock absorber, and a high-strength steel double beam frame.

This engine was fitted with the Aprilia AF1 50 Project 108, produced until 1988, then replaced by the AF1 50 Replica in 1989, with a new livery, and with the addition of the number 4 on the tail, and the Aprilia AF1 50 Futura first series, until in 1992 the last model of Aprilia AF1 came out, the 50 Futura Sport Pro which was equipped with an engine with insertion in the crankcase and balancing countershaft, called Minarelli AM3, always with the limitation of the three gears, powered by a Dell'ortho SHA 12/14 carburetor.

In 1993 the AF1 was replaced by the Aprilia RS 50, which mounted a 5-speed engine, the Minarelli AM5.

== Aprilia AF1 125 ==
This motorcycle came out in various series and with countless modifications even in the series themselves.

== First series ==
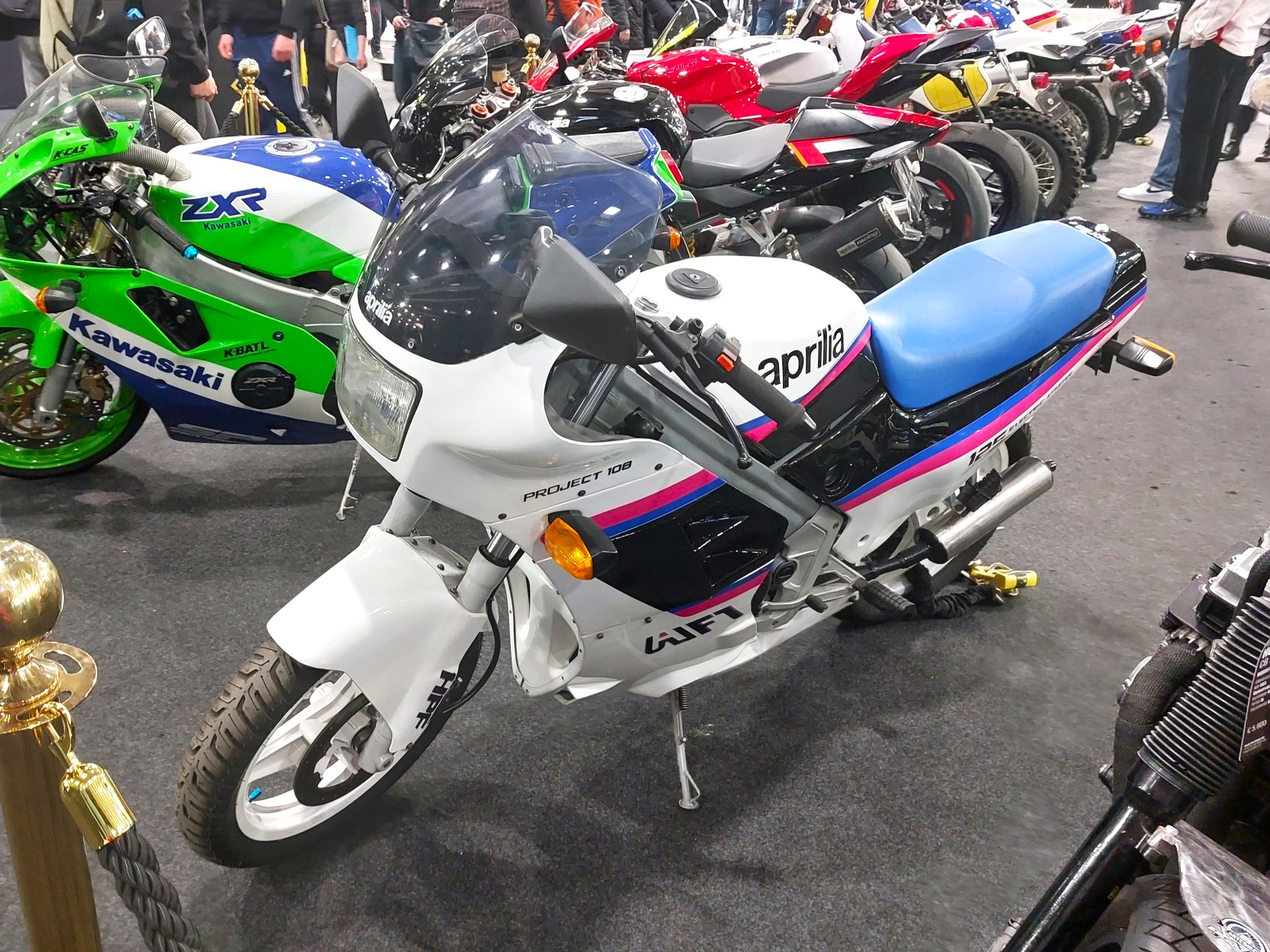
Aprilia AF1 125 Project 108

The Aprilia AF1 125 or AF1 125 Project 108 was released in 1987, with a 124.7 cm^{3} single cylinder Rotax V 127 2-stroke liquid-cooled engine with automatic mixer and 6-speed gearbox, this engine, powered by a Dell'Orto PHBH 26 ND carburetor developed 27 HP at 8,800 rpm and made the bike reach 158 km/h.

This motorcycle was equipped with a 38mm center pivot fork, a hydraulic single shock absorber, with single-sided swingarm (with the transmission crown outside the swingarm), 2 disc brakes, and a double steel beam frame, the wheels were 16 "to three spokes each, with 100/80 tires at the front and 120/80 at the rear, with a 260 mm Brembo front brake, while the rear was 240 mm.

This first version mounted a very aerodynamic and modern fairing, but with a single saddle for passenger and rider, at two different height levels; the fairing was equipped with a rectangular headlight and the lateral fairing had double air extractors for the radiator.

In 1988 the Aprilia AF1 125 Replica Reggiani was released, which was the same as the basic version, with the only difference being the Squadra Corse colors, but this version is very different from the previous year, with a seat cover for the passenger seat, the air extractor on the sides of the fairing is no longer double and the fairing is slightly different, with two very small front intakes under the new round double headlight.

This " replica " version celebrates Loris Reggiani's victory at the 250-class San Marino GP on the Misano Adriatico circuit (30 August 1987 ), the first victory of an Aprilia motorcycle in the world championship Grand Prix. engine, fitted as standard with an Dell'Orto VHSB34LD carburetor allowing to reach a power of 29.24 HP at 10,250 rpm.

== Second series ==
Also in 1988 the AF1 125 Sintesi was released which mounted a 38 mm upside-down fork, 17 " wheels, with 100/80 tires at the front and 130/70 at the rear, with new rims, with 7 all front and 9 at the rear, a new 320 mm front disc and the new Rotax 123 engine instead of the 127 (which increases the stroke by 0.5 mm, bringing the measurements to 54x54.5) with the adoption of the countershaft and of the new RAVE 2 valve in place of the previous Rave, in order to have better linearity of the engine, with a power of 29.06 HP (21.37 kW) at 10,500 rpm and a maximum speed of 167 km/h.

This bike does not differ from the previous year's model only for the mechanics, but also for the fairing, which is revised in its entirety, starting with the thinner and squared tail, with air extractors, while the lower part of the fairing now it covers, even more, the engine block and frame, but has some small extra slits in the lower part to extract the air, the fender is now much thinner, given the inverted forks.

The AF1 Sintesi '89 Replica presented on 3 December 1988 at the Bologna Motor Show and marketed in May 1989, took the place of the previous Sintesi just six months after its presentation. The '89 version is slightly updated both aesthetically, with a different top fairing, and mechanically with the adoption of an electronically controlled exhaust valve. The price in 1989 was Lire 5,690,000.

The Sintesi '89 was offered in two new colours. After successfully experimenting with tone-on-tone color combinations on the Project 108 and Sintesi '88, the Noale style office introduced the new Sintesi in new graphic elements. More precisely color triangles. The beloved Didier De Radiguès Replica version is a tribute to the bright colors, and to the bike of the Belgian champion who for the '89 season replaced Loris Reggiani at the wheel of the AF1 250. The mudguard and wheels are red. A triangle always colors part of the tank and hull red. Lilac dominates the median part of the fairing, the rear part of the tank, and a portion of the tail that integrates the side panels. The lower part of the fairing is white and, like on the Project 108 Replica, it adopts a large "A" symbol of the Aprilia logo and various stickers from the technical sponsors of the team that competes in the speed world championship. The three-quarters of the tail that house the number 4 (of the Belgian rider De Radigues) are instead colored in a lively aquamarine that also colors the passenger seat. The second color designed for those who do not like racing replicas adopts less gaudy tones, but the new graphic elements introduced perhaps stand out even more. The front fairing and upper part of the tank and saddle are purple, with a lilac thread, while the middle part of the bike is white.

At the Bologna Motor Show, the Replica sports the number 6 on the tail, however, conquered by Loris Reggiani in the 1987 season and not in 1988, where in fact he is only thirteenth. Reggiani - and the CR1 Racing Team that follows him - therefore did not renew the agreement with Aprilia for the '89 season and switched to the official Honda RS sponsored by HB, taking the assigned No. 6 with them. Therefore, the Aprilia team will use number 4 (which at that time was a "free" number) assigned by the FIM to the Belgian Didier De Radigues (who came from the 500 class and therefore did not have "his" number), new official team driver. Therefore, it is correct to speak of two Sintesi Replica mod. '89: an “early-series” Reggiani Replica version characterized by the number 6 on the codon and marketed in very few copies in the first months of '89 and the subsequent and identical De Radigues Replica characterized by the number 4 on the codon. The '89 Sintesi also proves to be a very competitive bike and wins the Italian Sport Production 125 championship in the under-21 category with Davide Bulega. Oct '89 is dedicated to those who want to race in the Sport Production championship.

=== The bike in brief ===
The Sintesi '89 does not appear too different from the 1988 progenitor, although the few changes made have given it a more modern and sporty line. These are the changes:

Fairing with a new design, now more streamlined and still equipped with a double headlight, but with a smaller diameter. New triple clamp with the “AF1″ logo embossed in the center of the triple clamp and new lower handlebars. New racing-style instrumentation produced by Veglia Borletti, which however loses the always useful fuel gauge present on the instrumentation of the previous AF1s and is perhaps considered too "touristy" by Aprilia. New fuel tank with aeronautical type tank cap and different fuel tap Cycling The chassis does not differ from the '88 Sintesi, although the suspension settings are different. The Sintesi '89 detects a dry weight of 130 kg. (131 kg the 88 version)

=== Motor ===
The engine of the '89 Sintesi is always the Rotax 123 mounted on the previous one and maintains the same thermal unit (code 223362 shown on the right side of the cylinder). However, minor changes are made:

RAVE exhaust valve controlled by an electronically controlled electric servomotor (pneumatic on version 89) New redesigned expansion and new calibration of the Dell'Orto PHBH 28RD carburetor Sand-colored painted engine casing Following the changes made, the maximum power at the wheel increases to 29.7 HP at 10500 rpm (instead of the 28.66 HP at 10500 rpm found on the '88 Synthesis). It should be noted how the skillful refinement work on the engine has produced not only a more powerful engine but also a more elastic one: the Sintesi '89 in fact records a time of 18.645 s over 400 meters from 50 km/h and an exit speed of 106 .51 km/h (19.352 if 96.26 km/h for the '88 Summary). The Sintesi '89 is therefore not only more docile and powerful than the previous version, but also faster, recording a top speed at the top for the category of 166.2 km/h (163.9 km/h for the 88 version). However, the greater speed performance of the Sintesi '89 is not due only to its engine, but also a spoiler specially designed by Aprilia men after months of testing. In fact, the hull of the '89 Sintesi adopts a new slightly less aerodynamic fairing than the Sintesi '88 and therefore loses something in speed tests compared to the previous model. So, after having done several experiments, a small spoiler is successfully adopted in place under the fairing which makes the bike more aerodynamic and therefore faster.

Carburation data Aprilia AF1 '89 Replica (nº4/6) From Dell'Orto manuals, there are two different types of carburetion adjustment for Aprilia AF1 125 '89, both with PHBH28RD carburetor:

if on the aluminum strip fixed to the float bowl there is the code 4055, then, throttle valve 50, needle 4x at the 3rd notch, emulsifier (nozzle) 266CF, main jet 120, idle jet 58, starter jet 70, needle valve 250, float 9.5 gr; if the strip has code 4077, then, throttle valve 55, needle 40x at 2nd notch, emulsifier 264T, high jet 132, low jet 52, choke jet 70, needle valve 250, float 9, 5 g The latest model of the Sintesi series was presented on 18 October '89 with the SP version renamed AF1 125 Sport, which celebrates Davide Bulega 's victory in the Sport Production championship, it was recolored and fitted with an electronic rave valve, with a carburetor Dell'Orto VHSB 34 LD, because this is an SP championship-ready motorcycle, in fact until this year it was allowed to fit carburetors up to 34 mm, bringing power to 31.23 HP (22.9 kW) at 10,500 rpm.

== Third Series ==
In 1990 the AF1 125 Futura came out, which had the characteristics of the 125 Sintesi only with the difference of the less rounded and thinner, therefore sharper fairings and saddles and the return of the rectangular headlight, resulting very similar to the future RS 125, the rims now they have less than 5 spokes at the front and rear (this version replaced the synthesis version in the following years) and the AF1 125 Sport which thanks to some small modifications, such as the Dell'orto PHBH 28 ND carburetor (measure bound by the SP regulation) reached 170 km / h and accelerating to 400 meters in 14 seconds. In the same year, the derivative Europa version without fairing was also presented.

In 1991 the AF1 125 Replica was released, the same as the basic version, but with 40 mm forks with the new 110/70 tire instead of the 100/80, a new swingarm to be able to use a 140/70 tire instead of 130/70, new 5-spoke wheels, and like the AF1 Replica Reggiani, it featured the colors of the Squadra Corse.

In 1992 the last of the AF1 series was released, the AF1 Futura Sport Pro 125, with a slightly different tail, with small air intakes, and slightly more up in the terminal part, and with a new front mudguard, finally the AF1 was replaced by the RS 125, with the new Rotax V 123 engine, more powerful and reliable.
