= 1990 British motorcycle Grand Prix =

(United Kingdom) 1990 British Grand Prix
Race details
- Race 11 of 15 races in the 1990 Grand Prix motorcycle racing season
- Date: 5 August 1990
- Official name: Shell British Motorcycle Grand Prix
- Location: Donington Park
- Course: Permanent racing facility; 4.023 km (2.500 mi)

500cc
Pole position
- Rider: (Australia) Wayne Gardner
- Time: 1:33.415
Fastest lap
- Rider: (United States) Kevin Schwantz
- Time: 1:33.762
Podium
- First: (United States) Kevin Schwantz
- Second: (United States) Wayne Rainey
- Third: (United States) Eddie Lawson

250cc
Pole position
- Rider: (United States) John Kocinski
- Time: 1:37.009
Fastest lap
- Rider: (Italy) Luca Cadalora
- Time: 1:37.326
Podium
- First: (Italy) Luca Cadalora
- Second: (Japan) Masahiro Shimizu
- Third: (Germany) Helmut Bradl

125cc
Pole position
- Rider: (Germany) Stefan Prein
- Time: 1:44.100
Fastest lap
- Rider: (Netherlands) Hans Spaan
- Time: 1:44.379
Podium
- First: (Italy) Loris Capirossi
- Second: (Italy) Doriano Romboni
- Third: (Netherlands) Hans Spaan

The 1990 British motorcycle Grand Prix was the eleventh round of the 1990 Grand Prix motorcycle racing season. It took place on the weekend of 3–5 August 1990 at Donington Park.

== 500 cc race report ==
Cagiva announces that after 10 years of participation it will withdraw from GP at the end of the season, citing cost overruns and lack of results. it is a false alarm, as they continue until 1994. Pierfrancesco Chili is replaced by Carl Fogarty.

Wayne Rainey gets a good start, but by the Craner Curves he is passed by Eddie Lawson, and is followed by Niall Mackenzie, Mick Doohan and Kevin Schwantz.

Rainey retakes the lead from Lawson, but Schwantz is now behind them. Wayne Gardner is out of the race with a mechanical and Fogarty crashes out.

Rainey still ahead, but Schwantz has moved into second ahead of Lawson at the chicane. Schwantz picks that same spot for his pass on Rainey, and is now in first. He opens up the gap and cruises to the win ahead of Rainey and Lawson.

== 500 cc classification ==
Pos.	Rider	Team	Manufacturer	Time/Retired	Points
1	(United States) Kevin Schwantz	Lucky Strike Suzuki	Suzuki	47:15.770	20
2	(United States) Wayne Rainey	Marlboro Team Roberts	Yamaha	+2.138	17
3	(United States) Eddie Lawson	Marlboro Team Roberts	Yamaha	+9.436	15
4	(Australia) Mick Doohan	Rothmans Honda Team	Honda	+40.383	13
5	(United Kingdom) Niall Mackenzie	Lucky Strike Suzuki	Suzuki	+59.608	11
6	(United States) Randy Mamola	Cagiva Corse	Cagiva	+1:07.650	10
7	(Spain) Juan Garriga	Ducados Yamaha	Yamaha	+1:21.386	9
8	(France) Christian Sarron	Sonauto Gauloises	Yamaha	+1:22.684	8
9	(France) Jean Philippe Ruggia	Sonauto Gauloises	Yamaha	+1:26.385	7
10	(United Kingdom) Ron Haslam	Cagiva Corse	Cagiva	+1:35.549	6
11	(Brazil) Alex Barros	Cagiva Corse	Cagiva	+1:36.041	5
12	(Republic of Ireland) Eddie Laycock	Millar Racing	Honda	+1 Lap	4
13	(Italy) Marco Papa	Team ROC Elf La Cinq	Honda	+1 Lap	3
14	(Luxembourg) Andreas Leuthe	Librenti Corse	Honda	+1 Lap	2
Ret	(Australia) Wayne Gardner	Rothmans Honda Team	Honda	Retirement	
Ret	(United Kingdom) Carl Fogarty	Team ROC Elf La Cinq	Honda	Retirement	
Ret	(Netherlands) Cees Doorakkers	HRK Motors	Honda	Retirement	
Ret	(Spain) Sito Pons	Campsa Banesto	Honda	Retirement	

Previous race: 1990 French Grand Prix	FIM Grand Prix World Championship; 1990 season	Next race: 1990 Swedish Grand Prix
Previous race: 1989 British Grand Prix	British Grand Prix	Next race: 1991 British Grand Prix
