= 1990 Swedish motorcycle Grand Prix =

(Sweden) 1990 Swedish Grand Prix
Race details
- Race 12 of 15 races in the 1990 Grand Prix motorcycle racing season
- Date: 12 August 1990
- Official name: Nordic TT
- Location: Scandinavian Raceway
- Course: Permanent racing facility; 4.025 km (2.501 mi)

500cc
Pole position
- Rider: (United States) Kevin Schwantz
- Time: 1:30.785
Fastest lap
- Rider: (United States) Wayne Rainey
- Time: 1:31.107
Podium
- First: (United States) Wayne Rainey
- Second: (United States) Eddie Lawson
- Third: (Australia) Wayne Gardner

250cc
Pole position
- Rider: (United States) John Kocinski
- Time: 1:35.105
Fastest lap
- Rider: (United States) John Kocinski
- Time: 1:34.833
Podium
- First: (Spain) Carlos Cardús
- Second: (United States) John Kocinski
- Third: (Japan) Masahiro Shimizu

125cc
Pole position
- Rider: (Germany) Stefan Prein
- Time: 1:41.786
Fastest lap
- Rider: (Germany) Stefan Prein
- Time: 1:41.909
Podium
- First: (Netherlands) Hans Spaan
- Second: (Italy) Alessandro Gramigni
- Third: (Italy) Doriano Romboni

The 1990 Swedish motorcycle Grand Prix was the twelfth round of the 1990 Grand Prix motorcycle racing season. It took place on the weekend of 10–12 August 1990 at the Anderstorp.

== 500 cc race report ==
Last year, Wayne Rainey lost any chance at the championship by crashing on this track, and this year he has a points advantage on Kevin Schwantz, but a DNF would just about erase the lead. He’s asked:

Q: “Is this going to be one of the occasions when you go for points rather than a win?”

WR: “Well, I’m going to go for both; it’s going to be tough tomorrow for those guys that have been going fast—if they go the same speed tomorrow; so we’re just going to ride around, have some fun and collect all the points we can get.”
Q: “You’ll be satisfied then if you don’t win?”

WR: “No.”

At the light, Rainey gets the start and is followed by Eddie Lawson, Mick Doohan, Randy Mamola, Carl Fogarty and Wayne Gardner. Schwantz is behind with another bad start.

Schwantz soon moves into fourth place, but then crashes out and ends much hope for the championship.

The race develops into two pairs: Rainey and Lawson on the Yamahas, then a small gap to the Hondas of Doohan and Gardner. Will Lawson stay behind Rainey and help him out as he said he would earlier in the season?

Gardner leaves Doohan and shows Lawson a wheel, but Lawson keeps Gardner under control for the moment. Ron Haslam crashes and runs off the track just as the leaders zoom in.

Gardner isn’t able to match Rainey and Lawson’s pace and finishes in third, and Lawson’s second place may have been deliberate in order to help teammate Rainey.

== 500 cc classification ==
Pos.	Rider	Team	Manufacturer	Time/Retired	Points
1	(United States) Wayne Rainey	Marlboro Team Roberts	Yamaha	46:01.689	20
2	(United States) Eddie Lawson	Marlboro Team Roberts	Yamaha	+1.149	17
3	(Australia) Wayne Gardner	Rothmans Honda Team	Honda	+3.564	15
4	(Australia) Mick Doohan	Rothmans Honda Team	Honda	+22.564	13
5	(United Kingdom) Niall Mackenzie	Lucky Strike Suzuki	Suzuki	+49.333	11
6	(United Kingdom) Carl Fogarty	Team ROC Elf La Cinq	Honda	+1:07.973	10
7	(France) Jean Philippe Ruggia	Sonauto Gauloises	Yamaha	+1:08.831	9
8	(Spain) Juan Garriga	Ducados Yamaha	Yamaha	+1:20.431	8
9	(Brazil) Alex Barros	Cagiva Corse	Cagiva	+1 Lap	7
10	(United Kingdom) Ron Haslam	Cagiva Corse	Cagiva	+1 Lap	6
11	(Italy) Marco Papa	Team ROC Elf La Cinq	Honda	+1 Lap	5
12	(Netherlands) Cees Doorakkers	HRK Motors	Honda	+1 Lap	4
13	(Sweden) Peter Linden		Honda	+1 Lap	3
Ret	(Finland) Eero Kuparinen		Honda	Retirement	
Ret	(United States) Randy Mamola	Cagiva Corse	Cagiva	Retirement	
Ret	(United States) Kevin Schwantz	Lucky Strike Suzuki	Suzuki	Retirement	
Ret	(Luxembourg) Andreas Leuthe	Librenti Corse	Honda	Retirement	
Ret	(France) Christian Sarron	Sonauto Gauloises	Yamaha	Retirement	

Previous race: 1990 British Grand Prix	FIM Grand Prix World Championship; 1990 season	Next race: 1990 Czechoslovak Grand Prix
Previous race: 1989 Swedish Grand Prix	Swedish Grand Prix	Next race: None
