= 1990 Czechoslovak motorcycle Grand Prix =

Motorcycle racing season

(Czechoslovakia) 1990 Czechoslovak Grand Prix
Race details
- Race 13 of 15 races in the 1990 Grand Prix motorcycle racing season
- Date: 26 August 1990
- Official name: Grand Prix Brno-ČSFR
- Location: Brno Circuit
- Course: Permanent racing facility; 5.403 km (3.357 mi)

500cc
Pole position
- Rider: (United States) Kevin Schwantz
- Time: 2:02.725
Fastest lap
- Rider: (United States) Wayne Rainey
- Time: 2:03.718
Podium
- First: (United States) Wayne Rainey
- Second: (Australia) Wayne Gardner
- Third: (United States) Eddie Lawson

250cc
Pole position
- Rider: (Germany) Helmut Bradl
- Time: 2:07.404
Fastest lap
- Rider: (Spain) Carlos Cardús
- Time: 2:07.341
Podium
- First: (Spain) Carlos Cardús
- Second: (United States) John Kocinski
- Third: (Germany) Helmut Bradl

125cc
Pole position
- Rider: Unknown
Fastest lap
- Rider: Unknown
Podium
- First: (Netherlands) Hans Spaan
- Second: (Germany) Stefan Prein
- Third: (Italy) Alessandro Gramigni

The 1990 Czechoslovak Motorcycle Grand Prix was the thirteenth round of the 1990 Grand Prix motorcycle racing season. It took place on the weekend of 24–26 August 1990 at the Masaryk Circuit located in Brno, Czechoslovakia.

== 500 cc race ==
Wayne Gardner crashes twice in the same qualifying session, without serious injury, and Eddie Lawson highsides.

Wayne Rainey gets the start, followed closely by Gardner, then Lawson, Mick Doohan and Kevin Schwantz. Gardner through into first, Schwantz into third.

As he closes the gap to the pair in front, Schwantz's front-end tucks in and he crashes out of third place. He runs to the bike to pick it up, but it is starting to burn.

Rainey is only just managing to stay on Gardner's wheel, and eventually passes. By the last lap, Rainey is well ahead of Gardner, and he wins the race and the championship. Lawson takes third, but is absent from the podium celebrations. While it may have been a coincidence that Lawson disappeared on the day he lost his title to Rainey, Lawson had a big fight with crew chief Warren Willing about the bike and left the facilities before the podium ceremonies.

Rainey: "Then, when I crossed the finish line, and I was World Champion, I had a burst of emotion. I felt really great, for about two tenths of a second. Then it was gone, and it was like – wow, what happened to everything? Here I am, with the thing I've devoted everything to win, and there wasn't anything there. It left me feeling really disappointed. It meant so much more to me emotionally losing the title in Sweden when I crashed out than it did winning it. It felt strange."

== 500 cc classification ==
Pos.	Rider	Team	Manufacturer	Time/Retired	Points
1	(United States) Wayne Rainey	Marlboro Team Roberts	Yamaha	+47:50.847	20
2	(Australia) Wayne Gardner	Rothmans Honda Team	Honda	+2.003	17
3	(United States) Eddie Lawson	Marlboro Team Roberts	Yamaha	+19.531	15
4	(United Kingdom) Niall Mackenzie	Lucky Strike Suzuki	Suzuki	+35.174	13
5	(Spain) Juan Garriga	Ducados Yamaha	Yamaha	+42.617	11
6	(France) Christian Sarron	Sonauto Gauloises	Yamaha	+46.250	10
7	(Spain) Sito Pons	Campsa Banesto	Honda	+51.386	9
8	(France) Jean Philippe Ruggia	Sonauto Gauloises	Yamaha	+1:06.249	8
9	(Australia) Mick Doohan	Rothmans Honda Team	Honda	+1:07.917	7
10	(United Kingdom) Carl Fogarty	Team ROC Elf La Cinq	Honda	+1:19.415	6
11	(United States) Randy Mamola	Cagiva Corse	Cagiva	+1:38.932	5
12	(United Kingdom) Ron Haslam	Cagiva Corse	Cagiva	+2:06.055	4
13	(Italy) Marco Papa	Team ROC Elf La Cinq	Honda	+1 Lap	3
14	(Republic of Ireland) Eddie Laycock	Millar Racing	Honda	+1 Lap	2
15	(France) Rachel Nicotte	Plaisir Vitesse Internationale	Plaisir	+1 Lap	1
16	(Netherlands) Cees Doorakkers	HRK Motors	Honda	+1 Lap	
17	(Germany) Martin Troesch		Honda	+2 Laps	
Ret	(United States) Kevin Schwantz	Lucky Strike Suzuki	Suzuki	Retirement	
Ret	(Austria) Karl Truchsess		Honda	Retirement	
Ret	(Brazil) Alex Barros	Cagiva Corse	Cagiva	Retirement	
Ret	(Luxembourg) Andreas Leuthe	Librenti Corse	Honda	Retirement	

Previous race: 1990 Swedish Grand Prix	FIM Grand Prix World Championship; 1990 season	Next race: 1990 Hungarian Grand Prix
Previous race: 1989 Czechoslovak Grand Prix	Czechoslovak Grand Prix	Next race: 1991 Czechoslovak Grand Prix
