= 1990 Spanish motorcycle Grand Prix =

(Spain) 1990 Spanish Grand Prix
Race details
- Race 3 of 15 races in the 1990 Grand Prix motorcycle racing season
- Date: 6 May 1990
- Official name: Gran Premio de España
- Location: Circuito de Jerez
- Course: Permanent racing facility; 4.428 km (2.751 mi)

500cc
Pole position
- Rider: (Australia) Mick Doohan
- Time: 1:47.891
Fastest lap
- Rider: (Australia) Mick Doohan
- Time: 1:48.290
Podium
- First: (Australia) Wayne Gardner
- Second: (United States) Wayne Rainey
- Third: (United States) Kevin Schwantz

250cc
Pole position
- Rider: (Germany) Helmut Bradl
- Time: 1:49.420
Fastest lap
- Rider: (Italy) Luca Cadalora
- Time: 1:50.318
Podium
- First: (United States) John Kocinski
- Second: (Italy) Luca Cadalora
- Third: (Germany) Helmut Bradl

125cc
Pole position
- Rider: (Spain) Jorge Martínez
- Time: 1:56.252
Fastest lap
- Rider: (Germany) Stefan Prein
- Time: 1:56.223
Podium
- First: (Spain) Jorge Martínez
- Second: (Germany) Stefan Prein
- Third: (Italy) Fausto Gresini

The 1990 Spanish motorcycle Grand Prix was the third round of the 1990 Grand Prix motorcycle racing season. It took place on the weekend of 4–6 May 1990 at the Jerez circuit.

== 500 cc race report ==
Niall Mackenzie takes Kevin Magee’s seat (who was injured at the previous round), and Mick Doohan gets pole position.

Doohan gets crowded back at the first turn, with Wayne Rainey, Christian Sarron, Wayne Gardner, and Kevin Schwantz ahead of him.

The riders are getting strung out: Rainey, with a small gap to Gardner, a small gap to Schwantz, and a small gap to a group that gets smaller by Alex Barros crashing out of it. Gardner catches and passes Rainey, and takes the win.

== 500 cc classification ==
Pos.	Rider	Team	Manufacturer	Time/Retired	Points
1	(Australia) Wayne Gardner	Rothmans Honda Team	Honda	52:58.021	20
2	(United States) Wayne Rainey	Marlboro Team Roberts	Yamaha	+7.307	17
3	(United States) Kevin Schwantz	Lucky Strike Suzuki	Suzuki	+22.088	15
4	(Australia) Mick Doohan	Rothmans Honda Team	Honda	+28.729	13
5	(Italy) Pierfrancesco Chili	Team ROC Elf La Cinq	Honda	+40.920	11
6	(Spain) Sito Pons	Campsa Banesto	Honda	+1:07.157	10
7	(France) Christian Sarron	Sonauto Gauloises	Yamaha	+1:12.205	9
8	(United Kingdom) Niall Mackenzie	Lucky Strike Suzuki	Suzuki	+1:13.260	8
9	(Spain) Juan Garriga	Ducados Yamaha	Yamaha	+1:25.360	7
10	(France) Jean Philippe Ruggia	Sonauto Gauloises	Yamaha	+1:34.395	6
11	(Republic of Ireland) Eddie Laycock	Millar Racing	Honda	+1 Lap	5
12	(Switzerland) Nicholas Schmassman	Team Schmassman	Honda	+2 Laps	4
13	(Netherlands) Cees Doorakkers	HRK Motors	Honda	+2 Laps	3
14	(Luxembourg) Andreas Leuthe	Librenti Corse	Honda	+2 Laps	2
15	(Germany) Hansjoerg Butz		Honda	+3 Laps	1
Ret	(Italy) Vittorio Scatola	Team Elit	Paton	Retirement	
Ret	(Brazil) Alex Barros	Cagiva Corse	Cagiva	Retirement	
Ret	(United States) Randy Mamola	Cagiva Corse	Cagiva	Retirement	
Ret	(United Kingdom) Ron Haslam	Cagiva Corse	Cagiva	Retirement	

Previous race: 1990 United States Grand Prix	FIM Grand Prix World Championship; 1990 season	Next race: 1990 Nations Grand Prix
Previous race: 1989 Spanish Grand Prix	Spanish motorcycle Grand Prix	Next race: 1991 Spanish Grand Prix
