= 1990 Nations motorcycle Grand Prix =

(Italy) 1990 Nations Grand Prix
Race details
- Race 4 of 15 races in the 1990 Grand Prix motorcycle racing season
- Date: 20 May 1990
- Official name: G.P d'Italia
- Location: Circuito Internazionale Santa Monica
- Course: Permanent racing facility; 3.488 km (2.167 mi)

500cc
Pole position
- Rider: (United States) Wayne Rainey
- Time: 1:16.019
Fastest lap
- Rider: (United States) Wayne Rainey
- Time: 1:15.912
Podium
- First: (United States) Wayne Rainey
- Second: (United States) Kevin Schwantz
- Third: (Australia) Mick Doohan

250cc
Pole position
- Rider: (United States) John Kocinski
- Time: 1:17.807
Fastest lap
- Rider: (United States) John Kocinski
- Time: 1:18.023
Podium
- First: (United States) John Kocinski
- Second: (Germany) Helmut Bradl
- Third: (Netherlands) Wilco Zeelenberg

125cc
Pole position
- Rider: (Spain) Jorge Martínez
- Time: 1:24.254
Fastest lap
- Rider: (Germany) Stefan Prein
- Time: 1:24.213
Podium
- First: (Spain) Jorge Martínez
- Second: (Germany) Dirk Raudies
- Third: (Italy) Loris Capirossi

The 1990 Nations motorcycle Grand Prix was the fourth race of the 1990 Grand Prix motorcycle racing season. It took place on the weekend of 18–20 May 1990 at the Misano circuit.

== 500 cc race report ==
In practice Christian Sarron falls in front of Wayne Gardner, bringing him down and causing Gardner to race with broken ribs.

At the first turn, Wayne Rainey and Kevin Schwantz go first, but Pierfrancesco Chili gets knocked off by Gardner, who came across the racing line. Chili kicks furiously at the gravel as he's escorted off the track.

A trio forms at the front: Rainey, Schwantz and Mick Doohan. Alex Barros crashes out for a second race in a row.

Rain brought out a red flag reminiscent of Spa ’89, when 3 races were run; a second race on aggregate time would follow. New start in the dry and Doohan gets the first turn, followed by Rainey and Mamola. It soon turns into Rainey, Doohan, Gardner and Schwantz at the front. It’s an aggressive group of four, who pass each other two at a time.

Schwantz takes the lead, and can’t suppress his tic of looking back while exiting on the throttle, a habit that caused him a crash last season.

Though the order crossing the line is Schwantz, Gardner, Rainey and Doohan, Rainey takes the win based on aggregate time.

== 500 cc classification ==
Pos.	Rider	Team	Manufacturer	Time/Retired	Points
1	(United States) Wayne Rainey	Marlboro Team Roberts	Yamaha	46:21.150	20
2	(United States) Kevin Schwantz	Lucky Strike Suzuki	Suzuki	+2.121	17
3	(Australia) Mick Doohan	Rothmans Honda Team	Honda	+7.870	15
4	(Australia) Wayne Gardner	Rothmans Honda Team	Honda	+9.732	13
5	(United Kingdom) Niall Mackenzie	Lucky Strike Suzuki	Suzuki	+1:13.452	11
6	(Spain) Sito Pons	Campsa Banesto	Honda	+1:20.365	10
7	(United States) Randy Mamola	Cagiva Corse	Cagiva	+1 Lap	9
8	(Spain) Juan Garriga	Ducados Yamaha	Yamaha	+1 Lap	8
9	(Italy) Marco Papa	Team ROC Elf La Cinq	Honda	+1 Lap	7
10	(Italy) Romolo Balbi		Honda	+1 Lap	6
11	(Italy) Michele Valdo		Honda	+2 Laps	5
12	(Sweden) Peter Lindén		Honda	+3 Laps	4
13	(Switzerland) Nicholas Schmassman	Team Schmassman	Honda	+3 Laps	3
14	(Netherlands) Cees Doorakkers	HRK Motors	Honda	+5 Laps	2
15	(Italy) Vittorio Scatola	Team Elit	Paton	+8 Laps	1
Ret	(United Kingdom) Ron Haslam	Cagiva Corse	Cagiva	Retirement	
Ret	(France) Jean Philippe Ruggia	Sonauto Gauloises	Yamaha	Retirement	
Ret	(Luxembourg) Andreas Leuthe	Librenti Corse	Honda	Retirement	
Ret	(France) Christian Sarron	Sonauto Gauloises	Yamaha	Retirement	
Ret	(Italy) Pierfrancesco Chili	Team ROC Elf La Cinq	Honda	Retirement	
Ret	(Brazil) Alex Barros	Cagiva Corse	Cagiva	Retirement	

Previous race: 1990 Spanish Grand Prix	FIM Grand Prix World Championship; 1990 season	Next race: 1990 German Grand Prix
Previous race: 1989 Nations Grand Prix	Nations Grand Prix	Next race: 1991 Italian Grand Prix; Starting in 1991, the race was known as the Italian motorcycle Grand Prix.
