= 1990 Australian motorcycle Grand Prix =

(Australia) 1990 Australian Grand Prix
Race details
- Race 15 of 15 races in the 1990 Grand Prix motorcycle racing season
- Date: 16 September 1990
- Official name: Drink/Drive Australian Motorcycle Grand Prix
- Location: Phillip Island Grand Prix Circuit
- Course: Permanent racing facility; 4.445 km (2.762 mi)

500cc
Pole position
- Rider: (Australia) Mick Doohan
- Time: 1:34.788
Fastest lap
- Rider: (Australia) Wayne Gardner
- Time: 1:34.560
Podium
- First: (Australia) Wayne Gardner
- Second: (Australia) Mick Doohan
- Third: (United States) Wayne Rainey

250cc
Pole position
- Rider: (United States) John Kocinski
- Time: 1:37.531
Fastest lap
- Rider: (United States) John Kocinski
- Time: 1:36.681
Podium
- First: (United States) John Kocinski
- Second: (Germany) Helmut Bradl
- Third: (Italy) Luca Cadalora

125cc
Pole position
- Rider: (Netherlands) Hans Spaan
- Time: 1:44.528
Fastest lap
- Rider: (Italy) Doriano Romboni
- Time: 1:43.959
Podium
- First: (Italy) Loris Capirossi
- Second: (Italy) Bruno Casanova
- Third: (Italy) Doriano Romboni

The 1990 Australian motorcycle Grand Prix was the last round of the 1990 Grand Prix motorcycle racing season. It took place on the weekend of 14–16 September 1990 at Phillip Island.

== 500 cc race report ==
Cagiva sat out the last race, as the grid was headed by Mick Doohan, Kevin Schwantz, Wayne Gardner and Eddie Lawson. The start went to the Rothmans Hondas, but by the hairpin Wayne Rainey was up to third. Exiting the hairpin, Gardner almost highsided, letting Rainey through.

Rainey took the lead from Doohan, with Gardner making it a trio away at the front. Rainey was passed by Doohan on the straight, but he re-took the lead by barging through the inside of the hairpin. Doohan passed on the straight again: the Yamaha was never beaten on straight-line speed. The trio became a quartet as Schwantz caught up, having set the fastest lap of the race.

Gardner's fairing came loose after his near-crash, but he managed to pass Rainey on the straight to take second spot, and again Rainey inelegantly pushed Gardner wide on the hairpin apex, which allowed Schwantz into third. With 7 laps to go, Doohan was out front down the straight, Schwantz in second and Gardner back into third as he passed Rainey into Turn One. He then passed Schwantz before the hairpin.

Gardner passed Doohan in Turn One, causing Doohan to nearly highside through the right-hander as Schwantz closed the gap that had been forming and then goes on to pass him. Rainey was still in fourth place. On the brakes into Turn One, Schwantz had a high-speed highside and crashed out of second. Gardner won the race in front of Doohan, with a small gap to Rainey in third.

== 500 cc classification ==
Pos.	Rider	Team	Manufacturer	Time/Retired	Points
1	(Australia) Wayne Gardner	Rothmans Honda Team	Honda	47:45.053	20
2	(Australia) Mick Doohan	Rothmans Honda Team	Honda	+0.856	17
3	(United States) Wayne Rainey	Marlboro Team Roberts	Yamaha	+2.739	15
4	(United States) Eddie Lawson	Marlboro Team Roberts	Yamaha	+42.532	13
5	(United Kingdom) Niall Mackenzie	Lucky Strike Suzuki	Suzuki	+54.520	11
6	(Spain) Juan Garriga	Ducados Yamaha	Yamaha	+1:00.539	10
7	(Spain) Sito Pons	Campsa Banesto	Honda	+1:05.231	9
8	(Australia) Peter Goddard	Yamaha Motor Company	Yamaha	+1:30.221	8
9	(Italy) Pierfrancesco Chili	Team ROC Elf La Cinq	Honda	+1 Lap	7
10	(Italy) Marco Papa	Team ROC Elf La Cinq	Honda	+1 Lap	6
11	(Republic of Ireland) Eddie Laycock	Millar Racing	Honda	+1 Lap	5
12	(Netherlands) Cees Doorakkers	HRK Motors	Honda	+1 Lap	4
Ret	(France) Jean Philippe Ruggia	Sonauto Gauloises	Yamaha	Retirement	
Ret	(Japan) Tadahiko Taira	Tech 21	Yamaha	Retirement	
Ret	(United States) Kevin Schwantz	Lucky Strike Suzuki	Suzuki	Retirement	
Ret	(France) Christian Sarron	Sonauto Gauloises	Yamaha	Retirement	
DNQ	(Switzerland) Nicholas Schmassman	Team Schmassman	Honda	Did not qualify	
DNQ	(Australia) Greg Drew		PRP	Did not qualify	
DNQ	(Australia) Craig Harwood		Yamaha	Did not qualify	
DNQ	(Australia) Scott Mitchell		Suzuki	Did not qualify	

Previous race: 1990 Hungarian Grand Prix	FIM Grand Prix World Championship; 1990 season	Next race: 1991 Japanese Grand Prix
Previous race: 1989 Australian Grand Prix	Australian motorcycle Grand Prix	Next race: 1991 Australian Grand Prix
