= 1990 French motorcycle Grand Prix =

(France) 1990 French Grand Prix
Race details
- Race 10 of 15 races in the 1990 Grand Prix motorcycle racing season
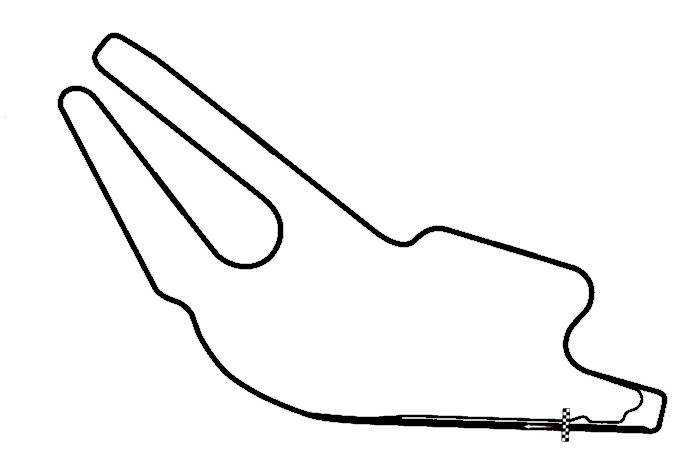
- Date: 22 July 1990
- Official name: Grand prix de France
- Location: Bugatti Circuit
- Course: Permanent racing facility; 7.004 km (4.352 mi)

500cc
Pole position
- Rider: (United States) Kevin Schwantz
- Time: 1:40.755
Fastest lap
- Rider: (United States) Kevin Schwantz
- Time: 1:41.953
Podium
- First: (United States) Kevin Schwantz
- Second: (Australia) Wayne Gardner
- Third: (United States) Wayne Rainey

250cc
Pole position
- Rider: (Spain) Carlos Cardús
- Time: 1:45.055
Fastest lap
- Rider: (United States) John Kocinski
- Time: 1:46.030
Podium
- First: (Spain) Carlos Cardús
- Second: (Italy) Luca Cadalora
- Third: (Italy) Loris Reggiani

125cc
Pole position
- Rider: (Italy) Doriano Romboni
- Time: 1:53.688
Fastest lap
- Rider: (Italy) Doriano Romboni
- Time: 1:54.006
Podium
- First: (Netherlands) Hans Spaan
- Second: (Italy) Doriano Romboni
- Third: (Germany) Stefan Prein

The 1990 French motorcycle Grand Prix was the tenth round of the 1990 Grand Prix motorcycle racing season. It took place on the weekend of 20–22 July 1990 at the Bugatti Circuit located in Le Mans.

== 500 cc race report ==
Kevin Schwantz on pole and race day is hot and sunny.

Wayne Rainey wheelies halfway down the straight, giving the first turn to Wayne Gardner, then it’s Mick Doohan in third place.

Gardner goes very wide on a turn and has to sit up, letting Rainey through and when he gets back on the racing line, he forces Doohan wide as well.

It’s still a tight race at the front between Rainey, Gardner, Schwantz, Doohan, Eddie Lawson and Christian Sarron.

Gardner takes Rainey on the straight, and in the same place Gardner went wide, Rainey goes a little off-line too, this time letting Schwantz through into second.

At La Chapelle Gardner goes wide again, and Schwantz takes the lead easily.

By the last lap, Schwantz has a good gap in first, followed by Gardner and Rainey.

== 500 cc classification ==
Pos.	Rider	Team	Manufacturer	Time/Retired	Points
1	(United States) Kevin Schwantz	Lucky Strike Suzuki	Suzuki	48:05.213	20
2	(Australia) Wayne Gardner	Rothmans Honda Team	Honda	+2.420	17
3	(United States) Wayne Rainey	Marlboro Team Roberts	Yamaha	+3.333	15
4	(Australia) Mick Doohan	Rothmans Honda Team	Honda	+4.865	13
5	(United States) Eddie Lawson	Marlboro Team Roberts	Yamaha	+10.157	11
6	(United Kingdom) Niall Mackenzie	Lucky Strike Suzuki	Suzuki	+20.480	10
7	(United States) Randy Mamola	Cagiva Corse	Cagiva	+1:18.898	9
8	(Spain) Juan Garriga	Ducados Yamaha	Yamaha	+1:30.771	8
9	(Italy) Marco Papa	Team ROC Elf La Cinq	Honda	+1:41.299	7
10	(United Kingdom) Ron Haslam	Cagiva Corse	Cagiva	+1 Lap	6
11	(Republic of Ireland) Eddie Laycock	Millar Racing	Honda	+1 Lap	5
12	(Netherlands) Cees Doorakkers	HRK Motors	Honda	+1 Lap	4
Ret	(France) Jean Philippe Ruggia	Sonauto Gauloises	Yamaha	Retirement	
Ret	(France) Christian Sarron	Sonauto Gauloises	Yamaha	Retirement	
Ret	(Austria) Karl Truchsess		Honda	Retirement	
Ret	(France) Rachel Nicotte	Plaisir Vitesse Internationale	Chevallier Yamaha	Retirement	
Ret	(Italy) Vittorio Scatola	Team Elit	Paton	Retirement	
Ret	(Germany) Martin Troesch		Honda	Retirement	
Ret	(Brazil) Alex Barros	Cagiva Corse	Cagiva	Retirement	
DNQ	(Switzerland) Nicholas Schmassman	Team Schmassman	Honda	Did not qualify	

Previous race: 1990 Belgian Grand Prix	FIM Grand Prix World Championship; 1990 season	Next race: 1990 British Grand Prix
Previous race: 1989 French Grand Prix	French Grand Prix	Next race: 1991 French Grand Prix
