= 1990 Austrian motorcycle Grand Prix =

(Austria) 1990 Austrian Grand Prix
Race details
- Race 6 of 15 races in the 1990 Grand Prix motorcycle racing season
- Date: 10 June 1990
- Official name: Großer Preis von Österreich
- Location: Salzburgring
- Course: Permanent racing facility; 4.243 km (2.636 mi)

500cc
Pole position
- Rider: (United States) Kevin Schwantz
- Time: 1:18.411
Fastest lap
- Rider: (United States) Kevin Schwantz
- Time: 1:18.341
Podium
- First: (United States) Kevin Schwantz
- Second: (United States) Wayne Rainey
- Third: (Australia) Mick Doohan

250cc
Pole position
- Rider: (Spain) Carlos Cardús
- Time: 1:23.709
Fastest lap
- Rider: (Italy) Luca Cadalora
- Time: 1:23.935
Podium
- First: (Italy) Luca Cadalora
- Second: (Germany) Martin Wimmer
- Third: (United States) John Kocinski

125cc
Pole position
- Rider: (Netherlands) Hans Spaan
- Time: 1:31.821
Fastest lap
- Rider: (Germany) Stefan Prein
- Time: 1:34.979
Podium
- First: (Spain) Jorge Martínez
- Second: (Italy) Loris Capirossi
- Third: (Germany) Stefan Prein

The 1990 Austrian motorcycle Grand Prix was the sixth round of the 1990 Grand Prix motorcycle racing season. It took place on the weekend of 8–10 June 1990 at the Salzburgring.

== 500 cc race report ==
Eddie Lawson is still out, as is Wayne Gardner.

First turn, it’s Wayne Rainey, Mick Doohan, Sito Pons, Kevin Schwantz, Pierfrancesco Chili, Niall Mackenzie and Christian Sarron. Schwantz begins to get a small gap from Rainey and Doohan, then there's another gap to Chili.

Rainey begins to bridge the gap to Schwantz, leaving Doohan. Rainey catches and tries a draft pass, but Schwantz denies it on the brakes. Rainey claws his way to the lead, but on the uphill drag, the 160 bhp Suzuki seems more than a match for the Yamaha as Schwantz passes Rainey again. On the last lap, Schwantz’ lead holds as he wins over Rainey and Doohan.

== 500cc classification ==
Pos.	Rider	Team	Manufacturer	Time/Retired	Points
1	(United States) Kevin Schwantz	Lucky Strike Suzuki	Suzuki	38:21.304	20
2	(United States) Wayne Rainey	Marlboro Team Roberts	Yamaha	+0.561	17
3	(Australia) Mick Doohan	Rothmans Honda Team	Honda	+25.304	15
4	(Italy) Pierfrancesco Chili	Team ROC Elf La Cinq	Honda	+37.304	13
5	(United Kingdom) Niall Mackenzie	Lucky Strike Suzuki	Suzuki	+46.434	11
6	(Spain) Sito Pons	Campsa Banesto	Honda	+46.871	10
7	(France) Christian Sarron	Sonauto Gauloises	Yamaha	+1:06.073	9
8	(France) Jean Philippe Ruggia	Sonauto Gauloises	Yamaha	+1:19.575	8
9	(Spain) Juan Garriga	Ducados Yamaha	Yamaha	+1 Lap	7
10	(United States) Randy Mamola	Cagiva Corse	Cagiva	+1 Lap	6
11	(Brazil) Alex Barros	Cagiva Corse	Cagiva	+1 Lap	5
12	(United Kingdom) Ron Haslam	Cagiva Corse	Cagiva	+1 Lap	4
13	(Italy) Marco Papa	Team ROC Elf La Cinq	Honda	+2 Laps	3
14	(Netherlands) Cees Doorakkers	HRK Motors	Honda	+2 Laps	2
15	(Austria) Karl Truchsess		Honda	+2 Laps	1
DNQ	(Germany) Hansjoerg Butz		Honda	Did not qualify	
DNQ	(Germany) Alois Meyer	Rallye Sport	Honda	Did not qualify	

Previous race: 1990 German Grand Prix	FIM Grand Prix World Championship; 1990 season	Next race: 1990 Yugoslavian Grand Prix
Previous race: 1989 Austrian Grand Prix	Austrian Grand Prix	Next race: 1991 Austrian Grand Prix
