= 1990 Hungarian motorcycle Grand Prix =

(Hungary) 1990 Hungarian Grand Prix
Race details
- Race 14 of 15 races in the 1990 Grand Prix motorcycle racing season
- Date: 2 September 1990
- Official name: Magyar Nagydíj
- Location: Hungaroring
- Course: Permanent racing facility; 3.968 km (2.466 mi)

500cc
Pole position
- Rider: (Australia) Mick Doohan
- Time: 1:43.971
Fastest lap
- Rider: (Australia) Mick Doohan
- Time: 1:44.390
Podium
- First: (Australia) Mick Doohan
- Second: (United States) Eddie Lawson
- Third: (United States) Kevin Schwantz

250cc
Pole position
- Rider: (United States) John Kocinski
- Time: 1:45.952
Fastest lap
- Rider: (United States) John Kocinski
- Time: 1:46.266
Podium
- First: (United States) John Kocinski
- Second: (Germany) Helmut Bradl
- Third: (Spain) Carlos Cardús

125cc
Pole position
- Rider: (Italy) Bruno Casanova
- Time: 1:52.300
Fastest lap
- Rider: (Italy) Bruno Casanova
- Time: 1:52.866
Podium
- First: (Italy) Loris Capirossi
- Second: (Switzerland) Heinz Lüthi
- Third: (Italy) Bruno Casanova

The 1990 Hungarian motorcycle Grand Prix was the penultimate round of the 1990 Grand Prix motorcycle racing season. It took place on the weekend of 31 August–2 September 1990 at the Hungaroring circuit.

== 500 cc race report ==
Wayne Rainey gets the start, then it’s Eddie Lawson, Kevin Schwantz, Wayne Gardner and Mick Doohan. Randy Mamola has a small highside and looks like he’s going to save it, but heads into the gravel and it falls as he bumps the tire barrier.

Doohan is on the move as he passes Gardner and Schwantz and catches up to Lawson. It’s a small gap up to Rainey. As they brake at the end of the start-finish straight, Lawson makes a mistake and goes wide, losing contact with Doohan, who catches Rainey.

Doohan passes Rainey on the straight as he did with Lawson, but Rainey can’t fight back as his bike breaks down. This is his first DNF, but the championship is sewn-up.

Doohan takes a big win, his first in 500s.

== 500 cc classification ==
Pos.	Rider	Team	Manufacturer	Time/Retired	Points
1	(Australia) Mick Doohan	Rothmans Honda Team	Honda	49:14.920	20
2	(United States) Eddie Lawson	Marlboro Team Roberts	Yamaha	+25.442	17
3	(United States) Kevin Schwantz	Lucky Strike Suzuki	Suzuki	+54.401	15
4	(Australia) Wayne Gardner	Rothmans Honda Team	Honda	+1:02.632	13
5	(Spain) Juan Garriga	Ducados Yamaha	Yamaha	+1:04.794	11
6	(France) Jean Philippe Ruggia	Sonauto Gauloises	Yamaha	+1:05.970	10
7	(United Kingdom) Niall Mackenzie	Lucky Strike Suzuki	Suzuki	+1:06.248	9
8	(United Kingdom) Carl Fogarty	Team ROC Elf La Cinq	Honda	+1:15.589	8
9	(Brazil) Alex Barros	Cagiva Corse	Cagiva	+1:34.000	7
10	(Spain) Sito Pons	Campsa Banesto	Honda	+1:39.945	6
11	(United Kingdom) Ron Haslam	Cagiva Corse	Cagiva	+1:46.026	5
12	(Italy) Marco Papa	Team ROC Elf La Cinq	Honda	+1 Lap	4
13	(France) Rachel Nicotte	Plaisir Vitesse Internationale	Plaisir	+1 Lap	3
14	(Republic of Ireland) Eddie Laycock	Millar Racing	Honda	+1 Lap	2
15	(Germany) Martin Troesch		Honda	+2 Laps	1
16	(Netherlands) Cees Doorakkers	HRK Motors	Honda	+2 Laps	
Ret	(United States) Wayne Rainey	Marlboro Team Roberts	Yamaha	Retirement	
Ret	(Luxembourg) Andreas Leuthe	Librenti Corse	Honda	Retirement	
Ret	(Austria) Karl Truchsess		Honda	Retirement	
Ret	(France) Christian Sarron	Sonauto Gauloises	Yamaha	Retirement	
Ret	(Sweden) Peter Linden		Honda	Retirement	
Ret	(United States) Randy Mamola	Cagiva Corse	Cagiva	Retirement	

Previous race: 1990 Czechoslovak Grand Prix	FIM Grand Prix World Championship; 1990 season	Next race: 1990 Australian Grand Prix
Previous race: None	Hungarian Grand Prix	Next race: 1992 Hungarian Grand Prix
