= 1990 Yugoslav motorcycle Grand Prix =

(Socialist Federal Republic of Yugoslavia) 1990 Yugoslav Grand Prix
Race details
- Race 7 of 15 races in the 1990 Grand Prix motorcycle racing season
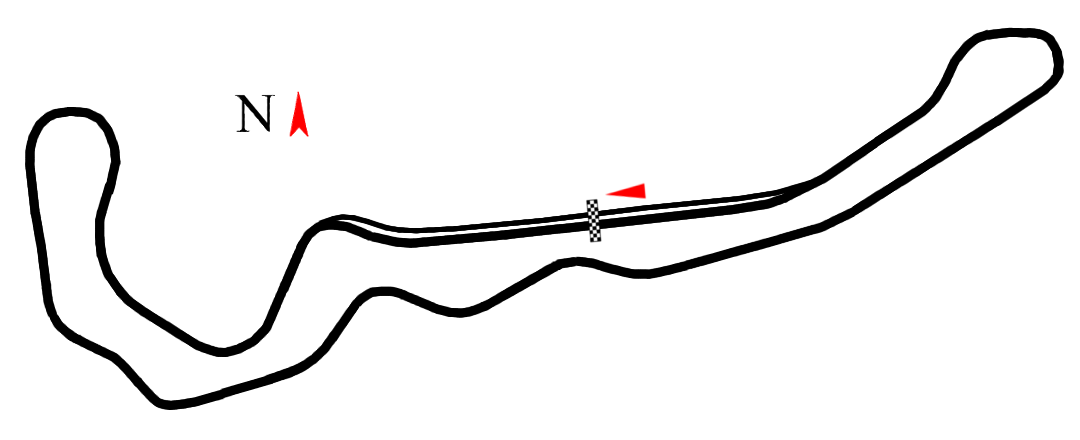
- Date: 17 June 1990
- Official name: Yu Grand Prix
- Location: Automotodrom Rijeka
- Course: Permanent racing facility; 4.168 km (2.590 mi)

500cc
Pole position
- Rider: (United States) Wayne Rainey
- Time: 1:28.433
Fastest lap
- Rider: (United States) Wayne Rainey
- Time: 1:29.220
Podium
- First: (United States) Wayne Rainey
- Second: (United States) Kevin Schwantz
- Third: (United Kingdom) Niall Mackenzie

250cc
Pole position
- Rider: (United States) John Kocinski
- Time: 1:31.313
Fastest lap
- Rider: (Germany) Reinhold Roth
- Time: 1:31.952
Podium
- First: (Spain) Carlos Cardús
- Second: (United States) John Kocinski
- Third: (Germany) Martin Wimmer

125cc
Pole position
- Rider: (Spain) Jorge Martínez
- Time: 1:37.191
Fastest lap
- Rider: (Italy) Doriano Romboni
- Time: 1:38.076
Podium
- First: (Germany) Stefan Prein
- Second: (Italy) Loris Capirossi
- Third: (Italy) Bruno Casanova

The 1990 Yugoslavian motorcycle Grand Prix was the seventh round of the 1990 Grand Prix motorcycle racing season. It took place on the weekend of 15–17 June 1990 at the Rijeka circuit.

== 500 cc race ==
In qualifying Christian Sarron crashed and dragged off the tarmac by track marshals, which brought complaints from riders that the race organization was unprofessional.

At the start, Wayne Rainey led, followed by Mick Doohan and Niall Mackenzie, while behind them two Cagiva riders collided and crashed: Ron Haslam and Randy Mamola. Haslam touched the back of a bike, and fell off into Mamola. After this, Alex Barros crashed, leaving Cagiva without anymore riders in the race.

Schwantz found his rhythm and caught the group of three chasing Rainey: Doohan, Mackenzie and Chili; a small gap to the fight for sixth between Ruggia and Sito Pons.

The gap to Rainey looked too big to close, and the fight for second narrowed down to Mackenzie and Schwantz. Behind him, Doohan led Pons and Chili, but Pons lost the front end on the exit of a right turn, and Chili hit the fallen rider or bike and was thrown into the air. The question of race organization came to mind again when Pons was not immediately sent for a medical checkup.

== 250 cc race ==
During practice Wilco Zeelenberg was severely injured in an accident that sent him and his bike up a hill into the spectators behind scattered hay bales. None were injured. Australian Darren Milner would deputise for him in the remaining sessions.

The race was disrupted by torrential rain, and it would have been stopped with two laps to go. However, with marshalls not waving red flags at all parts of the circuit, this was not properly communicated to the riders. Milner spotted a red flag in the distance and slowed down to a dangerous degree. Reinhold Roth came from behind at full speed and was trying to evade Àlex Crivillé, but he was blindsided by Milner and they collided, flinging both riders through the air over the track and collecting Crivillé from his bike mid-air. With all of the red flags finally out, riders were still lapping around the circuit, while spectators and medical personnel flooded the scene to aid the three afflicted. Milner and Crivillé were dragged away in an unprofessional and dangerous manner, but Roth was left comatose and had to be airlifted to a nearby clinic for emergency checkups. The impact of the accident left him paralysed from the waist down, and the cerebral damage he suffered would eventually lead to a fatal lung collapse in 2021.

Carlos Cardus was declared the winner.

== 500 cc classification ==
| Pos. | Rider | Team | Manufacturer | Time/Retired | Points |
|---|---|---|---|---|---|
| 1 | (United States) Wayne Rainey | Marlboro Team Roberts | Yamaha | 48:10.806 | 20 |
| 2 | (United States) Kevin Schwantz | Lucky Strike Suzuki | Suzuki | +10.074 | 17 |
| 3 | (United Kingdom) Niall Mackenzie | Lucky Strike Suzuki | Suzuki | +33.685 | 15 |
| 4 | (Australia) Mick Doohan | Rothmans Honda Team | Honda | +43.530 | 13 |
| 5 | (France) Jean Philippe Ruggia | Sonauto Gauloises | Yamaha | +1:11.447 | 11 |
| 6 | (Italy) Marco Papa | Team ROC Elf La Cinq | Honda | +1 Lap | 10 |
| 7 | (Netherlands) Cees Doorakkers | HRK Motors | Honda | +1 Lap | 9 |
| 8 | (Austria) Karl Truchsess | | Honda | +1 Lap | 8 |
| 9 | (Switzerland) Nicholas Schmassman | Team Schmassman | Honda | +1 Lap | 7 |
| Ret | (Italy) Vittorio Scatola | Team Elit | Paton | Retirement | |
| Ret | (Spain) Sito Pons | Campsa Banesto | Honda | Retirement | |
| Ret | (United Kingdom) Ron Haslam | Cagiva Corse | Cagiva | Retirement | |
| Ret | (United States) Randy Mamola | Cagiva Corse | Cagiva | Retirement | |
| Ret | (Spain) Juan Garriga | Ducados Yamaha | Yamaha | Retirement | |
| Ret | (Italy) Pierfrancesco Chili | Team ROC Elf La Cinq | Honda | Retirement | |
| Ret | (Brazil) Alex Barros | Cagiva Corse | Cagiva | Retirement | |

| Previous race: 1990 Austrian Grand Prix | FIM Grand Prix World Championship; 1990 season | Next race: 1990 Dutch TT |
| Previous race: 1989 Yugoslavian Grand Prix | Yugoslavian Grand Prix | Next race: None |
