= 1990 Dutch TT =

(Netherlands) 1990 Dutch Grand Prix
Race details
- Race 8 of 15 races in the 1990 Grand Prix motorcycle racing season
- Date: 30 June 1990
- Official name: Dutch TT
- Location: TT Circuit Assen
- Course: Permanent racing facility; 6.049 km (3.759 mi)

500cc
Pole position
- Rider: (United States) Kevin Schwantz
- Time: 2:03.207
Fastest lap
- Rider: (United States) Kevin Schwantz
- Time: 2:03.480
Podium
- First: (United States) Kevin Schwantz
- Second: (United States) Wayne Rainey
- Third: (United States) Eddie Lawson

250cc
Pole position
- Rider: (Spain) Carlos Cardús
- Time: 2:08.926
Fastest lap
- Rider: (United States) John Kocinski
- Time: 2:09.448
Podium
- First: (United States) John Kocinski
- Second: (Spain) Carlos Cardús
- Third: (Netherlands) Wilco Zeelenberg

125cc
Pole position
- Rider: (Netherlands) Hans Spaan
- Time: 2:19.726
Fastest lap
- Rider: (Italy) Doriano Romboni
- Time: 2:20.214
Podium
- First: (Italy) Doriano Romboni
- Second: (Italy) Bruno Casanova
- Third: (Germany) Adi Stadler

The 1990 Dutch TT was the eighth round of the 1990 Grand Prix motorcycle racing season. It took place on the weekend of 28–30 June 1989 at the TT Circuit Assen located in Assen, Netherlands. Kevin Schwantz won the race, with Wayne Rainey in close second and Eddie Lawson in third.

== 500 cc classification ==
| Pos. | Rider | Team | Manufacturer | Time/Retired | Points |
|---|---|---|---|---|---|
| 1 | (United States) Kevin Schwantz | Lucky Strike Suzuki | Suzuki | 43:35.097 | 20 |
| 2 | (United States) Wayne Rainey | Marlboro Team Roberts | Yamaha | +0.636 | 17 |
| 3 | (United States) Eddie Lawson | Marlboro Team Roberts | Yamaha | +25.450 | 15 |
| 4 | (Australia) Mick Doohan | Rothmans Honda Team | Honda | +44.799 | 13 |
| 5 | (United Kingdom) Niall Mackenzie | Lucky Strike Suzuki | Suzuki | +56.530 | 11 |
| 6 | (Spain) Juan Garriga | Ducados Yamaha | Yamaha | +1:04.564 | 10 |
| 7 | (France) Christian Sarron | Sonauto Gauloises | Yamaha | +1:06.152 | 9 |
| 8 | (Italy) Pierfrancesco Chili | Team ROC Elf La Cinq | Honda | +1:28.150 | 8 |
| 9 | (United Kingdom) Ron Haslam | Cagiva Corse | Cagiva | +1:43.893 | 7 |
| 10 | (Brazil) Alex Barros | Cagiva Corse | Cagiva | +1 Lap | 6 |
| 11 | (France) Jean Philippe Ruggia | Sonauto Gauloises | Yamaha | +1 Lap | 5 |
| 12 | (Republic of Ireland) Eddie Laycock | Millar Racing | Honda | +1 Lap | 4 |
| 13 | (Netherlands) Cees Doorakkers | HRK Motors | Honda | +1 Lap | 3 |
| 14 | (Italy) Marco Papa | Team ROC Elf La Cinq | Honda | +1 Lap | 2 |
| 15 | (Austria) Karl Truchsess | | Honda | +2 Laps | 1 |
| 16 | (Switzerland) Nicholas Schmassman | Team Schmassman | Honda | +2 Laps | |
| 17 | (Finland) Eero Kuparinen | | Honda | +3 Laps | |
| 18 | (United States) Randy Mamola | Cagiva Corse | Cagiva | +4 Laps | |
| Ret | (Australia) Wayne Gardner | Rothmans Honda Team | Honda | Retirement | |
| Ret | (Japan) Norihiko Fujiwara | Yamaha Motor Company | Yamaha | Retirement | |
| Ret | (Italy) Vittorio Scatola | Team Elit | Paton | Retirement | |

| Previous race: 1990 Yugoslavian Grand Prix | FIM Grand Prix World Championship; 1990 season | Next race: 1990 Belgian Grand Prix |
| Previous race: 1989 Dutch TT | Dutch TT | Next race: 1991 Dutch TT |
