= 1990 German motorcycle Grand Prix =

(West Germany) 1990 German Grand Prix
Race details
- Race 5 of 15 races in the 1990 Grand Prix motorcycle racing season
- Date: 27 May 1990
- Official name: Großer Preis von Deutschland
- Location: Nürburgring
- Course: Permanent racing facility; 4.542 km (2.822 mi)

500cc
Pole position
- Rider: (United States) Kevin Schwantz
- Time: 1:38.185
Fastest lap
- Rider: (United States) Kevin Schwantz
- Time: 1:39.048
Podium
- First: (United States) Kevin Schwantz
- Second: (United States) Wayne Rainey
- Third: (United Kingdom) Niall Mackenzie

250cc
Pole position
- Rider: (Italy) Luca Cadalora
- Time: 1:42.518
Fastest lap
- Rider: (Netherlands) Wilco Zeelenberg
- Time: 1:43.046
Podium
- First: (Netherlands) Wilco Zeelenberg
- Second: (Spain) Carlos Cardús
- Third: (United States) John Kocinski

125cc
Pole position
- Rider: (Italy) Doriano Romboni
- Time: 1:51.766
Fastest lap
- Rider: (Spain) Jorge Martínez
- Time: 1:51.433
Podium
- First: (Italy) Doriano Romboni
- Second: (Germany) Dirk Raudies
- Third: (Italy) Loris Capirossi

The 1990 German motorcycle Grand Prix was the fifth round of the 1990 Grand Prix motorcycle racing season. It took place on the weekend of 25–27 May 1990 at the Nürburgring race track.

== 500 cc race report ==
Though recovering from injury, Wayne Gardner refuses to stay off the bike, and breaks his foot badly in practice. In qualifying, Wayne Rainey falls off and breaks a finger, but makes the start.

Through the first turn it’s Kevin Schwantz, Mick Doohan and Pierfrancesco Chili. Rainey is down at 6th.

After a few laps it’s Schwantz, Doohan and Chili, then a small gap to Christian Sarron, Sito Pons and Rainey. In a bizarre accident, Doohan and Chili, without touching, have simultaneous highsides. Doohan’s crash is messy, his bike riding him off the track.

Schwantz is safely away, and Rainey takes the lead in the new fight for second. Rainey leaves the group, and the fight for third is split three-ways between Mackenzie, Sarron and Pons.

== 500 cc classification ==
| Pos. | Rider | Team | Manufacturer | Time/Retired | Points |
|---|---|---|---|---|---|
| 1 | (United States) Kevin Schwantz | Lucky Strike Suzuki | Suzuki | 50:18.517 | 20 |
| 2 | (United States) Wayne Rainey | Marlboro Team Roberts | Yamaha | +11.868 | 17 |
| 3 | (United Kingdom) Niall Mackenzie | Lucky Strike Suzuki | Suzuki | +27.206 | 15 |
| 4 | (France) Christian Sarron | Sonauto Gauloises | Yamaha | +35.129 | 13 |
| 5 | (Spain) Sito Pons | Campsa Banesto | Honda | +44.015 | 11 |
| 6 | (France) Jean Philippe Ruggia | Sonauto Gauloises | Yamaha | +1:02.188 | 10 |
| 7 | (Spain) Juan Garriga | Ducados Yamaha | Yamaha | +1:21.646 | 9 |
| 8 | (Brazil) Alex Barros | Cagiva Corse | Cagiva | +1 Lap | 8 |
| 9 | (United States) Randy Mamola | Cagiva Corse | Cagiva | +1 Lap | 7 |
| 10 | (Netherlands) Cees Doorakkers | HRK Motors | Honda | +1 Lap | 6 |
| 11 | (Italy) Marco Papa | Team ROC Elf La Cinq | Honda | +1 Lap | 5 |
| 12 | (Luxembourg) Andreas Leuthe | Librenti Corse | Honda | +1 Lap | 4 |
| 13 | (Switzerland) Nicholas Schmassman | Team Schmassman | Honda | +1 Lap | 3 |
| 14 | (Germany) Hansjoerg Butz | | Honda | +1 Lap | 2 |
| 15 | (Sweden) Peter Linden | | Honda | +1 Lap | 1 |
| 16 | (Italy) Vittorio Scatola | Team Elit | Paton | +6 Laps | |
| Ret | (Australia) Mick Doohan | Rothmans Honda Team | Honda | Retirement | |
| Ret | (Italy) Pierfrancesco Chili | Team ROC Elf La Cinq | Honda | Retirement | |
| DNQ | (Germany) Alois Meyer | Rallye Sport | Honda | Did not qualify | |

| Previous race: 1990 Nations Grand Prix | FIM Grand Prix World Championship; 1990 season | Next race: 1990 Austrian Grand Prix |
| Previous race: 1989 German Grand Prix | German Grand Prix | Next race: 1991 German Grand Prix |
