= 1990 Belgian motorcycle Grand Prix =

(Belgium) 1990 Belgian Grand Prix
Race details
- Race 9 of 15 races in the 1990 Grand Prix motorcycle racing season
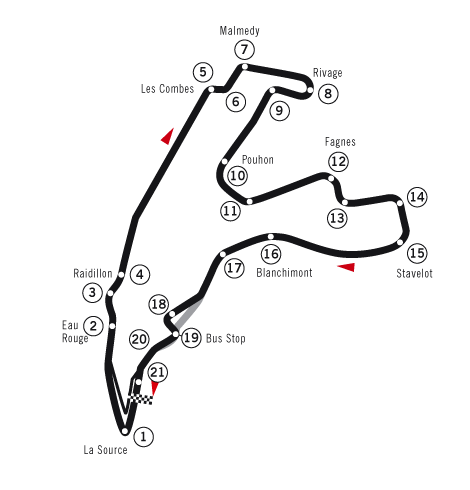
- Date: 7 July 1990
- Official name: Belgian Motorcycle Grand Prix
- Location: Circuit de Spa-Francorchamps
- Course: Permanent racing facility; 7.004 km (4.352 mi)

500cc
Pole position
- Rider: (United States) Kevin Schwantz
- Time: 2:23.264
Fastest lap
- Rider: (United States) Wayne Rainey
- Time: 2:45.784
Podium
- First: (United States) Wayne Rainey
- Second: (France) Jean-Philippe Ruggia
- Third: (United States) Eddie Lawson

250cc
Pole position
- Rider: (United States) John Kocinski
- Time: 2:31.106
Fastest lap
- Rider: (United States) John Kocinski
- Time: 2:47.579
Podium
- First: (United States) John Kocinski
- Second: (Belgium) Didier de Radiguès
- Third: (Spain) Carlos Cardús

125cc
Pole position
- Rider: (Spain) Jorge Martínez
- Time: 2:41.811
Fastest lap
- Rider: (Netherlands) Hans Spaan
- Time: 2:58.280
Podium
- First: (Netherlands) Hans Spaan
- Second: (Italy) Loris Capirossi
- Third: (Italy) Bruno Casanova

The 1990 Belgian motorcycle Grand Prix was the ninth round of the 1990 Grand Prix motorcycle racing season. It took place on the weekend of 5–7 July 1990 at Spa-Francorchamps.

| Pos. | Rider | Team | Manufacturer | Time/Retired | Points |
|---|---|---|---|---|---|
| 1 | (United States) Wayne Rainey | Marlboro Team Roberts | Yamaha | 50:29.205 | 20 |
| 2 | (France) Jean Philippe Ruggia | Sonauto Gauloises | Yamaha | +4.522 | 17 |
| 3 | (United States) Eddie Lawson | Marlboro Team Roberts | Yamaha | +20.566 | 15 |
| 4 | (France) Christian Sarron | Sonauto Gauloises | Yamaha | +45.258 | 13 |
| 5 | (Brazil) Alex Barros | Cagiva Corse | Cagiva | +51.060 | 11 |
| 6 | (Australia) Mick Doohan | Rothmans Honda Team | Honda | +1:18.021 | 10 |
| 7 | (United States) Kevin Schwantz | Lucky Strike Suzuki | Suzuki | +1:20.961 | 9 |
| 8 | (United Kingdom) Ron Haslam | Cagiva Corse | Cagiva | +1:23.596 | 8 |
| 9 | (Spain) Juan Garriga | Ducados Yamaha | Yamaha | +1:24.073 | 7 |
| 10 | (Australia) Wayne Gardner | Rothmans Honda Team | Honda | +1:50.520 | 6 |
| 11 | (Japan) Norihiko Fujiwara | Yamaha Motor Company | Yamaha | +2:01.935 | 5 |
| 12 | (United Kingdom) Niall Mackenzie | Lucky Strike Suzuki | Suzuki | +2:20.060 | 4 |
| 13 | (Republic of Ireland) Eddie Laycock | Millar Racing | Honda | +1 Lap | 3 |
| 14 | (Austria) Karl Truchsess | Shell | Paton | +1 Lap | 2 |
| 15 | (Netherlands) Cees Doorakkers | HRK Motors | Honda | +1 Lap | 1 |
| Ret | (Italy) Marco Papa | Team ROC Elf La Cinq | Honda | Retirement | |
| Ret | (Switzerland) Nicholas Schmassman | Team Schmassman | Honda | Retirement | |
| Ret | (Italy) Vittorio Scatola | Team Elit | Paton | Retirement | |
| Ret | (United States) Randy Mamola | Cagiva Corse | Cagiva | Retirement | |
| Ret | (Italy) Pierfrancesco Chili | Team ROC Elf La Cinq | Honda | Retirement | |

| Previous race: 1990 Dutch TT | FIM Grand Prix World Championship; 1990 season | Next race: 1990 French Grand Prix |
| Previous race: 1989 Belgian Grand Prix | Belgian Grand Prix | Next race: None |
