= Stefan Prein =

German motorcycle racer

- Nationality: German
- Born: 27 October 1965 (age 61); Wuppertal
Motorcycle racing career statistics
Grand Prix motorcycle racing
| Active years | 1988 - 1995 |
| First race | 1988 125cc Spanish Grand Prix |
| Last race | 1995 125cc Catalan Grand Prix |
| First win | 1990 125cc Yugoslavian Grand Prix |
| Last win | 1990 125cc Yugoslavian Grand Prix |
Starts / Wins / Podiums / Poles / F. laps / Points; 103 / 1 / 8 / 2 / 5 / 409

Stefan Prein (born 27 October 1965 in Wuppertal) is a former Grand Prix motorcycle road racer from Germany. His best year was in 1990 when he won the 125cc Yugoslavian Grand Prix and finished the season in third place in the 125cc world championship, behind Loris Capirossi and Hans Spaan.
