= Scott Doohan =

Australian motorcycle racer

- Nationality: Australian
- Born: 24 May 1963 (age 63); Brisbane, Australia
Motorcycle racing career statistics
500cc World Championship
Active years	1994
Manufacturers	Harris Yamaha
Starts / Wins / Podiums / Poles / F. laps / Points; 1 / 0 / 0 / 0 / 0 / 4
Superbike World Championship
Active years	1989–1992
Manufacturers	Bimota, Honda, Yamaha
Starts / Wins / Podiums / Poles / F. laps / Points; 14 / 0 / 0 / 0 / 0 / 71

Scott Robert Doohan (born 24 May 1963) is an Australian former motorcycle racer. He competed in selected rounds of the Superbike World Championship from 1989 to 1992 and in a 500cc World Championship race in 1994. He is the older brother of Mick Doohan.

== Career statistics ==
=== Superbike World Championship ===
==== Races by year ====
(key)

Year	Make	1		2		3		4		5		6		7		8		9		10		11		12		13		Pos.	Pts
Year	Make	R1	R2	R1	R2	R1	R2	R1	R2	R1	R2	R1	R2	R1	R2	R1	R2	R1	R2	R1	R2	R1	R2	R1	R2	R1	R2	Pos.	Pts
1989	Bimota	GBR	GBR	HUN	HUN	CAN	CAN	USA	USA	AUT	AUT	FRA	FRA	JPN; 14	JPN; 22	GER	GER	ITA	ITA									55th	8
1989	Honda																			AUS; 10	AUS; Ret	NZL	NZL					55th	8
1990	Honda	SPA	SPA	GBR	GBR	HUN	HUN	GER	GER	CAN	CAN	USA	USA	AUT	AUT	JPN	JPN	FRA	FRA	ITA	ITA	MAL	MAL	AUS; 7	AUS; 6	NZL	NZL	30th	19
1991	Yamaha	GBR	GBR	SPA	SPA	CAN	CAN	USA	USA	AUT	AUT	RSM	RSM	SWE	SWE	JPN	JPN	MAL; 17	MAL; 14	GER	GER	FRA	FRA	ITA	ITA	AUS; 7	AUS; 5	30th	22
1992	Yamaha	SPA	SPA	GBR	GBR	GER	GER	BEL	BEL	AND	AND	AUT	AUT	RSM	RSM	MAL	MAL	JPN	JPN	NED	NED	ITA	ITA	AUS; Ret	AUS; 10	NZL; 8	NZL; 8	25th	22

=== Grand Prix motorcycle racing ===
==== By season ====
Season	Class	Motorcycle	Race	Win	Podium	Pole	FLap	Pts	Plcd
1994	500cc	Harris Yamaha	1	0	0	0	0	4	29th
Total			1	0	0	0	0	4	

==== Races by year ====
(key)

Year	Class	Bike	1	2	3	4	5	6	7	8	9	10	11	12	13	14	Pos.	Pts
1994	500cc	Harris Yamaha	AUS; 12	MAL	JPN	SPA	AUT	GER	NED	ITA	FRA	GBR	CZE	USA	ARG	EUR	29th	4
