= List of Grand Prix motorcycle racers: D =

Name	Seasons	World Championships	MotoGP Wins	500cc Wins	350cc Wins	Moto2 Wins	250cc Wins	Moto3 Wins	125cc Wins	80cc Wins	50cc Wins	MotoE Wins
(Italy) Massimiliano d'Agnano	1995	0	0	0	0	0	0	0	0	0	0	0
(United States) Chris D'Aluisio	1990-1994	0	0	0	0	0	0	0	0	0	0	0
(Spain) Luis D'Antin	1989, 1992-1998	0	0	0	0	0	0	0	0	0	0	0
(France) Jehan d'Orgeix	1993	0	0	0	0	0	0	0	0	0	0	0
(Netherlands) Gerard Daalhuizen	?	0	0	0	0	0	0	0	0	0	0	0
(France) Julien Da Costa	1999-2000	0	0	0	0	0	0	0	0	0	0	0
(France) Patrick Dadier	?	0	0	0	0	0	0	0	0	0	0	0
(Switzerland) Willy Dafflon	?	0	0	0	0	0	0	0	0	0	0	0
(Malaysia) Kasma Daniel	2017, 2020, 2022-2023	0	0	0	0	0	0	0	0	0	0	0
(United Kingdom) Harold Daniell	1949-1950	0	0	1	0	0	0	0	0	0	0	0
(Malaysia) Hakim Danish	2025-	0	0	0	0	0	0	1	0	0	0	0
(United Kingdom) Chaz Davies	2002-2007, 2024	0	0	0	0	0	0	0	0	0	0	0
(Italy) Raffaele De Rosa	2004-2011	0	0	0	0	0	0	0	0	0	0	0
(Spain) Alex Debón	2004-2011	0	0	0	0	0	0	0	0	0	0	0
(Germany) Ernst Degner	1957-1966	1; 50cc - 1962	0	0	0	0	0	0	8	0	7	0
(Switzerland) Noah Dettwiler	2023-2025	0	0	0	0	0	0	0	0	0	0	0
(Italy) Fabio Di Giannantonio	2015-	0	2	0	0	1	0	2	0	0	0	0
(United Kingdom) Barry Ditchburn	1977, 1979	0	0	0	0	0	0	0	0	0	0	0
(United Kingdom) Jake Dixon	2017, 2019-2025	0	0	0	0	7	0	0	0	0	0	0
(Australia) Mick Doohan	1989-1999	5; 500cc - 1994-1998	0	54	0	0	0	0	0	0	0	0
(Australia) Scott Doohan	1994	0	0	0	0	0	0	0	0	0	0	0
(Netherlands) Cees Doorakkers	1984-1995	0	0	0	0	0	0	0	0	0	0	0
(United Kingdom) William Doran	1949, 1951-1953, 1991	0	0	0	0	0	0	0	0	0	0	0
(Switzerland) Stefan Dörflinger	1973-1990	4; 80cc - 1984-1985; 50cc - 1982-1983	0	0	0	0	0	0	0	9	9	0
(Italy) Andrea Dovizioso	2001-2022	1; 125cc - 2004	15	0	0	0	4	0	5	0	0	0
(Hungary) János Drapál	1969-1973, 1976-1977, 1980-1981	0	0	0	3	0	1	0	0	0	0	0
(Canada) Mike Duff	1961-1967	0	0	0	0	0	2	0	1	0	0	0
(United Kingdom) Geoff Duke	1950-1959	6; 500cc - 1951, 1953-1955; 350cc - 1951-1952	0	22	11	0	0	0	0	0	0	0
(Switzerland) Jason Dupasquier	2020-2021	0	0	0	0	0	0	0	0	0	0	0
