= 1994 Italian motorcycle Grand Prix =

(Italy) 1994 Italian Grand Prix
Race details
- Race 8 of 14 races in the 1994 Grand Prix motorcycle racing season
- Date: 3 July 1994
- Official name: Gran Premio d'Italia
- Location: Autodromo Internazionale del Mugello
- Course: Permanent racing facility; 5.245 km (3.259 mi)

MotoGP
Pole position
- Rider: (Italy) Luca Cadalora
- Time: 1:53.730
Fastest lap
- Rider: (Italy) Luca Cadalora
- Time: 1:54.354
Podium
- First: (Australia) Mick Doohan
- Second: (Italy) Luca Cadalora
- Third: (United States) Kevin Schwantz

250cc
Pole position
- Rider: (Italy) Max Biaggi
- Time: 1:55.856
Fastest lap
- Rider: (Italy) Max Biaggi
- Time: 1:56.102
Podium
- First: (Germany) Ralf Waldmann
- Second: (Japan) Tetsuya Harada
- Third: (Italy) Loris Capirossi

125cc
Pole position
- Rider: (Italy) Roberto Locatelli
- Time: 2:02.401
Fastest lap
- Rider: (Japan) Kazuto Sakata
- Time: 2:02.541
Podium
- First: (Japan) Noboru Ueda
- Second: (Japan) Kazuto Sakata
- Third: (Japan) Takeshi Tsujimura

The 1994 Italian motorcycle Grand Prix was the eighth race of the 1994 Grand Prix motorcycle racing season. It took place on 3 July 1994 at the Mugello Circuit.

== 500 cc classification ==
Pos.	Rider	Team	Manufacturer	Laps	Time/Retired	Points
1	(Australia) Mick Doohan	Honda Team HRC	Honda	23	44:20.402	25
2	(Italy) Luca Cadalora	Marlboro Team Roberts	Yamaha	23	+5.784	20
3	(United States) Kevin Schwantz	Lucky Strike Suzuki	Suzuki	23	+17.336	16
4	(Spain) Alberto Puig	Ducados Honda Pons	Honda	23	+24.104	13
5	(Japan) Shinichi Itoh	Honda Team HRC	Honda	23	+24.182	11
6	(Australia) Daryl Beattie	Marlboro Team Roberts	Yamaha	23	+28.736	10
7	(Brazil) Alex Barros	Lucky Strike Suzuki	Suzuki	23	+34.560	9
8	(France) Bernard Garcia	Yamaha Motor France	ROC Yamaha	23	+48.570	8
9	(United Kingdom) Niall Mackenzie	Slick 50 Team WCM	ROC Yamaha	23	+1:01.510	7
10	(Spain) Juan López Mella	Lopez Mella Racing Team	ROC Yamaha	23	+1:23.996	6
11	(France) Jean Pierre Jeandat	JPJ Racing	ROC Yamaha	23	+1:26.116	5
12	(Italy) Cristiano Migliorati	Team Pedercini	ROC Yamaha	23	+1:26.974	4
13	(Switzerland) Bernard Haenggeli	Haenggeli Racing	ROC Yamaha	23	+1:28.165	3
14	(United Kingdom) Sean Emmett	Shell Harris Grand Prix	Harris Yamaha	23	+1:33.838	2
15	(United Kingdom) Jeremy McWilliams	Millar Racing	Yamaha	23	+1:34.572	1
16	(Belgium) Laurent Naveau	Euro Team	ROC Yamaha	23	+1:50.218	
17	(France) Bruno Bonhuil	MTD Objectif 500	ROC Yamaha	22	+1 Lap	
18	(Italy) Ermanno Bastianini	Team Elit	ROC Yamaha	22	+1 Lap	
19	(France) Jean Foray	Jean Foray Racing Team	ROC Yamaha	22	+1 Lap	
20	(Italy) Lucio Pedercini	Team Pedercini	ROC Yamaha	22	+1 Lap	
21	(Netherlands) Cees Doorakkers	Team Doorakkers	Harris Yamaha	22	+1 Lap	
Ret	(Spain) Àlex Crivillé	Honda Team HRC	Honda	22	Accident	
Ret	(France) Marc Garcia	DR Team Shark	ROC Yamaha	18	Retirement	
Ret	(Spain) Julián Miralles	Team ROC	ROC Yamaha	17	Retirement	
Ret	(United States) Doug Chandler	Cagiva Team Agostini	Cagiva	16	Mechanical	
Ret	(United States) John Kocinski	Cagiva Team Agostini	Cagiva	16	Accident	
Ret	(Italy) Vittorio Scatola	Team Paton	Paton	9	Retirement	
Ret	(Luxembourg) Andreas Leuthe	Team Doppler Austria	ROC Yamaha	3	Retirement	
Ret	(Italy) Loris Reggiani	Aprilia Racing Team	Aprilia	2	Mechanical	
Ret	(United Kingdom) John Reynolds	Padgett's Motorcycles	Harris Yamaha	2	Retirement	
Ret	(United Kingdom) Kevin Mitchell	MBM Racing	Harris Yamaha	0	Retirement	

== 250 cc classification ==
Pos	Rider	Manufacturer	Laps	Time/Retired	Points
1	(Germany) Ralf Waldmann	Honda	21	41:05.128	25
2	(Japan) Tetsuya Harada	Yamaha	21	+2.060	20
3	(Italy) Loris Capirossi	Honda	21	+5.204	16
4	(France) Jean Philippe Ruggia	Aprilia	21	+8.457	13
5	(Italy) Marcellino Lucchi	Aprilia	21	+9.248	11
6	(Spain) Luis D'Antin	Honda	21	+41.106	10
7	(Japan) Tadayuki Okada	Honda	21	+41.366	9
8	(France) Jean-Michel Bayle	Aprilia	21	+41.451	8
9	(Netherlands) Wilco Zeelenberg	Honda	21	+41.676	7
10	(Spain) Carlos Checa	Honda	21	+59.688	6
11	(Switzerland) Adrien Bosshard	Honda	21	+1:02.744	5
12	(Austria) Andreas Preining	Aprilia	21	+1:13.230	4
13	(Italy) Alessandro Gramigni	Aprilia	21	+1:13.362	3
14	(Netherlands) Patrick vd Goorbergh	Aprilia	21	+1:13.400	2
15	(Germany) Bernd Kassner	Aprilia	21	+1:16.140	1
16	(Netherlands) Jurgen vd Goorbergh	Aprilia	21	+1:16.196	
17	(France) Noel Ferro	Honda	21	+1:24.973	
18	(Germany) Adolf Stadler	Honda	21	+1:25.146	
19	(Spain) Luis Maurel	Honda	21	+1:37.392	
20	(France) Frederic Protat	Honda	21	+2:08.994	
21	(Finland) Krisse Kaas	Yamaha	20	+1 Lap	
22	(France) Christian Boudinot	Aprilia	20	+1 Lap	
23	(Canada) Rodney Fee	Honda	20	+1 Lap	
Ret	(Italy) Giuseppe Fiorillo	Honda	12	Retirement	
Ret	(Italy) Max Biaggi	Aprilia	10	Accident	
Ret	(Japan) Toshihiko Honma	Yamaha	10	Retirement	
Ret	(Italy) Doriano Romboni	Honda	6	Heat Stroke	
Ret	(Switzerland) Eskil Suter	Aprilia	6	Retirement	
Ret	(Italy) Davide Bulega	Aprilia	6	Retirement	
Ret	(United Kingdom) Alan Patterson	Honda	4	Retirement	
Ret	(Spain) José Luis Cardoso	Aprilia	1	Retirement	
Ret	(Spain) Manuel Hernandez	Aprilia	1	Retirement	
Ret	(Spain) Enrique de Juan	Aprilia	1	Retirement	
DNS	(Japan) Nobuatsu Aoki	Honda		Did not start	

- Nobuatsu Aoki suffered a shoulder injury in a crash during practice and withdrew from the event.

== 125 cc classification ==
Pos	Rider	Manufacturer	Laps	Time/Retired	Points
1	(Japan) Noboru Ueda	Honda	20	41:25.510	25
2	(Japan) Kazuto Sakata	Aprilia	20	+3.470	20
3	(Japan) Takeshi Tsujimura	Honda	20	+8.738	16
4	(Germany) Peter Öttl	Aprilia	20	+8.800	13
5	(Germany) Dirk Raudies	Honda	20	+17.833	11
6	(Japan) Masaki Tokudome	Honda	20	+25.412	10
7	(Spain) Jorge Martinez	Yamaha	20	+25.470	9
8	(Japan) Tomomi Manako	Honda	20	+25.496	8
9	(Japan) Haruchika Aoki	Honda	20	+25.557	7
10	(Italy) Roberto Locatelli	Aprilia	20	+25.846	6
11	(Switzerland) Olivier Petrucciani	Aprilia	20	+25.960	5
12	(Netherlands) Loek Bodelier	Honda	20	+27.866	4
13	(Spain) Herri Torrontegui	Aprilia	20	+35.759	3
14	(Japan) Akira Saito	Honda	20	+42.976	2
15	(Spain) Carlos Giro	Aprilia	20	+42.998	1
16	(Germany) Stefan Prein	Yamaha	20	+43.702	
17	(Italy) Fausto Gresini	Honda	20	+46.160	
18	(Spain) Emilio Alzamora	Honda	20	+46.216	
19	(Italy) Gabriele Debbia	Honda	20	+59.976	
20	(Germany) Manfred Geissler	Aprilia	20	+1:04.920	
21	(Italy) Luigi Ancona	Honda	20	+1:05.010	
22	(Netherlands) Hans Spaan	Honda	20	+1:29.676	
23	(Italy) Vittorio Lopez	Honda	20	+1:29.704	
24	(Japan) Yasuaki Takahashi	Honda	20	+2:07.080	
25	(France) Bertrand Stey	Honda	20	+2:08.555	
NC	(Japan) Hideyuki Nakajo	Honda	13	+ 7 Laps	
Ret	(Australia) Garry McCoy	Aprilia	13	Retirement	
Ret	(United Kingdom) Neil Hodgson	Honda	10	Retirement	
Ret	(Italy) Stefano Perugini	Aprilia	9	Retirement	
Ret	(Austria) Manfred Baumann	Yamaha	7	Retirement	
Ret	(Italy) Lucio Cecchinello	Honda	5	Retirement	
Ret	(Italy) Gianluigi Scalvini	Aprilia	3	Retirement	
Ret	(France) Frederic Petit	Yamaha	1	Retirement	
Ret	(Italy) Ivan Cremonini	Aprilia	0	Retirement	
Ret	(Germany) Frank Baldinger	Aprilia	0	Retirement	
DNS	(Japan) Yoshiaki Katoh	Yamaha		Did not start	

- Yoshiaki Katoh suffered a kneecap injury in a crash during practice and withdrew from the event.

Previous race: 1994 Dutch TT	FIM Grand Prix World Championship; 1994 season	Next race: 1994 French Grand Prix
Previous race: 1993 Italian Grand Prix	Italian Grand Prix	Next race: 1995 Italian Grand Prix
