= 1994 Malaysian motorcycle Grand Prix =

(Malaysia) 1994 Malaysian Grand Prix
Race details
- Race 2 of 14 races in the 1994 Grand Prix motorcycle racing season
- Date: 10 April 1994
- Official name: Malaysian Grand Prix
- Location: Shah Alam Circuit
- Course: Permanent racing facility; 3.69 km (2.29 mi)

MotoGP
Pole position
- Rider: (United States) John Kocinski
- Time: 1:25.180
Fastest lap
- Rider: (Australia) Mick Doohan
- Time: 1:25.925 on lap 19
Podium
- First: (Australia) Mick Doohan
- Second: (United States) John Kocinski
- Third: (Japan) Shinichi Itoh

250cc
Pole position
- Rider: (Italy) Max Biaggi
- Time: 1:26.618
Fastest lap
- Rider: (Italy) Max Biaggi
- Time: 1:26.847
Podium
- First: (Italy) Max Biaggi
- Second: (Japan) Tadayuki Okada
- Third: (Italy) Loris Capirossi

125cc
Pole position
- Rider: (Japan) Kazuto Sakata
- Time: 1:31.685
Fastest lap
- Rider: (Japan) Noboru Ueda
- Time: 1:32.583
Podium
- First: (Japan) Noboru Ueda
- Second: (Japan) Kazuto Sakata
- Third: (Spain) Jorge Martínez

The 1994 Malaysian motorcycle Grand Prix was the second round of the 1994 Grand Prix motorcycle racing season. It took place on the weekend of 10 April 1994 at the Shah Alam Circuit.

== 500 cc classification ==
| Pos. | Rider | Team | Manufacturer | Laps | Time/Retired | Points |
|---|---|---|---|---|---|---|
| 1 | (Australia) Mick Doohan | Honda Team HRC | Honda | 33 | 47:36.874 | 25 |
| 2 | (United States) John Kocinski | Cagiva Team Agostini | Cagiva | 33 | +5.225 | 20 |
| 3 | (Japan) Shinichi Itoh | Honda Team HRC | Honda | 33 | +7.579 | 16 |
| 4 | (Italy) Luca Cadalora | Marlboro Team Roberts | Yamaha | 33 | +8.915 | 13 |
| 5 | (Spain) Alberto Puig | Ducados Honda Pons | Honda | 33 | +19.814 | 11 |
| 6 | (United States) Kevin Schwantz | Lucky Strike Suzuki | Suzuki | 33 | +23.345 | 10 |
| 7 | (Brazil) Alex Barros | Lucky Strike Suzuki | Suzuki | 33 | +25.054 | 9 |
| 8 | (Spain) Àlex Crivillé | Honda Team HRC | Honda | 33 | +33.344 | 8 |
| 9 | (United States) Doug Chandler | Cagiva Team Agostini | Cagiva | 33 | +40.231 | 7 |
| 10 | (Australia) Daryl Beattie | Marlboro Team Roberts | Yamaha | 33 | +1:08.599 | 6 |
| 11 | (United Kingdom) Niall Mackenzie | Slick 50 Team WCM | ROC Yamaha | 33 | +1:15.153 | 5 |
| 12 | (United Kingdom) John Reynolds | Padgett's Motorcycles | Harris Yamaha | 33 | +1:23.835 | 4 |
| 13 | (United Kingdom) Sean Emmett | Shell Harris Grand Prix | Harris Yamaha | 32 | +1 Lap | 3 |
| 14 | (United Kingdom) Jeremy McWilliams | Millar Racing | Yamaha | 32 | +1 Lap | 2 |
| 15 | (Italy) Lucio Pedercini | Team Pedercini | Yamaha | 32 | +1 Lap | 1 |
| 16 | (France) Jean Pierre Jeandat | JPJ Racing | ROC Yamaha | 32 | +1 Lap | |
| 17 | (France) Bruno Bonhuil | MTD Objectif 500 | ROC Yamaha | 32 | +1 Lap | |
| 18 | (France) Marc Garcia | DR Team Shark | ROC Yamaha | 32 | +1 Lap | |
| 19 | (Netherlands) Cees Doorakkers | Team Doorakkers | Harris Yamaha | 32 | +1 Lap | |
| 20 | (Italy) Cristiano Migliorati | Team Pedercini | ROC Yamaha | 32 | +1 Lap | |
| 21 | (Luxembourg) Andreas Leuthe | Team Doppler Austria | ROC Yamaha | 31 | +2 Laps | |
| Ret | (Switzerland) Bernard Haenggeli | Haenggeli Racing | ROC Yamaha | 30 | Retirement | |
| Ret | (Spain) Julián Miralles | Team ROC | ROC Yamaha | 28 | Retirement | |
| Ret | (Spain) Juan López Mella | Lopez Mella Racing Team | ROC Yamaha | 26 | Retirement | |
| Ret | (Germany) Lothar Neukirchner | Sachsen Racing Team | Harris Yamaha | 21 | Retirement | |
| Ret | (France) Bernard Garcia | Yamaha Motor France | ROC Yamaha | 16 | Retirement | |
| Ret | (France) Jean Foray | Jean Foray Racing Team | ROC Yamaha | 11 | Retirement | |
| Ret | (Italy) Marco Papa | Team Elit | ROC Yamaha | 6 | Retirement | |
| Ret | (Belgium) Laurent Naveau | Euro Team | ROC Yamaha | 3 | Accident | |
| Ret | (United Kingdom) Kevin Mitchell | MBM Racing | Harris Yamaha | 2 | Retirement | |
| DNS | (Italy) Vittorio Scatola | Team Paton | Paton | | Did not start | |

== 250 cc classification ==
| Pos | Rider | Manufacturer | Laps | Time/Retired | Points |
|---|---|---|---|---|---|
| 1 | (Italy) Max Biaggi | Aprilia | 31 | 45:26.300 | 25 |
| 2 | (Japan) Tadayuki Okada | Honda | 31 | +5.808 | 20 |
| 3 | (Italy) Loris Capirossi | Honda | 31 | +9.177 | 16 |
| 4 | (France) Jean Philippe Ruggia | Aprilia | 31 | +13.972 | 13 |
| 5 | (Italy) Doriano Romboni | Honda | 31 | +29.783 | 11 |
| 6 | (Germany) Ralf Waldmann | Honda | 31 | +31.037 | 10 |
| 7 | (France) Jean-Michel Bayle | Aprilia | 31 | +37.952 | 9 |
| 8 | (Spain) Luis D'Antin | Honda | 31 | +50.118 | 8 |
| 9 | (Netherlands) Wilco Zeelenberg | Honda | 31 | +53.384 | 7 |
| 10 | (Italy) Alessandro Gramigni | Aprilia | 31 | +1:02.324 | 6 |
| 11 | (Spain) Carlos Checa | Honda | 31 | +1:10.442 | 5 |
| 12 | (Switzerland) Adrien Bosshard | Honda | 31 | +1:10.848 | 4 |
| 13 | (Austria) Andreas Preining | Aprilia | 31 | +1:11.352 | 3 |
| 14 | (Germany) Bernd Kassner | Aprilia | 30 | +1 Lap | 2 |
| 15 | (Germany) Adolf Stadler | Honda | 30 | +1 Lap | 1 |
| 16 | (Spain) Luis Maurel | Honda | 30 | +1 Lap | |
| 17 | (Malaysia) Shahrun Nizam | Yamaha | 30 | +1 Lap | |
| 18 | (France) Frederic Protat | Honda | 30 | +1 Lap | |
| 19 | (France) Noel Ferro | Honda | 30 | +1 Lap | |
| 20 | (Italy) Giuseppe Fiorillo | Honda | 30 | +1 Lap | |
| 21 | (Malaysia) Meng Heng Kuang | Yamaha | 30 | +1 Lap | |
| 22 | (United Kingdom) Alan Patterson | Honda | 30 | +1 Lap | |
| 23 | (Finland) Krisse Kaas | Yamaha | 29 | +2 Laps | |
| 24 | (Canada) Rodney Fee | Honda | 29 | +2 Laps | |
| Ret | (Japan) Nobuatsu Aoki | Honda | 27 | Accident | |
| Ret | (Netherlands) Patrick vd Goorbergh | Aprilia | 24 | Retirement | |
| Ret | (Switzerland) Eskil Suter | Aprilia | 18 | Retirement | |
| Ret | (Spain) Enrique de Juan | Aprilia | 17 | Retirement | |
| Ret | (France) Chrisrian Boudinot | Aprilia | 7 | Retirement | |
| Ret | (Spain) José Luis Cardoso | Aprilia | 3 | Retirement | |
| Ret | (Spain) Juan Borja | Aprilia | 1 | Retirement | |
| Ret | (Netherlands) Jurgen vd Goorbergh | Aprilia | 0 | Accident | |

== 125 cc classification ==
| Pos | Rider | Manufacturer | Laps | Time/Retired | Points |
|---|---|---|---|---|---|
| 1 | (Japan) Noboru Ueda | Honda | 29 | 45:09.031 | 25 |
| 2 | (Japan) Kazuto Sakata | Aprilia | 29 | +1.357 | 20 |
| 3 | (Spain) Jorge Martinez | Yamaha | 29 | +4.775 | 16 |
| 4 | (Germany) Dirk Raudies | Honda | 29 | +6.725 | 13 |
| 5 | (Japan) Takeshi Tsujimura | Honda | 29 | +14.007 | 11 |
| 6 | (Italy) Fausto Gresini | Honda | 29 | +24.225 | 10 |
| 7 | (Switzerland) Olivier Petrucciani | Aprilia | 29 | +27.805 | 9 |
| 8 | (Japan) Akira Saito | Honda | 29 | +32.533 | 8 |
| 9 | (Spain) Herri Torrontegui | Aprilia | 29 | +32.720 | 7 |
| 10 | (Japan) Haruchika Aoki | Honda | 29 | +32.887 | 6 |
| 11 | (Japan) Hideyuki Nakajo | Honda | 29 | +33.535 | 5 |
| 12 | (Australia) Garry McCoy | Aprilia | 29 | +49.050 | 4 |
| 13 | (Germany) Oliver Koch | Honda | 29 | +49.213 | 3 |
| 14 | (Japan) Masaki Tokudome | Honda | 29 | +49.378 | 2 |
| 15 | (Italy) Bruno Casanova | Honda | 29 | +51.899 | 1 |
| 16 | (Germany) Manfred Geissler | Aprilia | 29 | +1:05.407 | |
| 17 | (United Kingdom) Neil Hodgson | Honda | 29 | +1:07.618 | |
| 18 | (Italy) Vittorio Lopez | Honda | 29 | +1:24.064 | |
| 19 | (Japan) Masafumo Ono | Honda | 29 | +1:24.821 | |
| 20 | (Malaysia) Chee Kieong Soong | Yamaha | 29 | +1:25.964 | |
| 21 | (Italy) Lucio Cecchinello | Honda | 29 | +1:29.786 | |
| 22 | (Austria) Manfred Baumann | Yamaha | 29 | +1:36.568 | |
| 23 | (Netherlands) Hans Spaan | Honda | 28 | +1 Lap | |
| Ret | (Japan) Tomoko Igata | Honda | 19 | Retirement | |
| Ret | (Germany) Stefan Prein | Yamaha | 7 | Accident | |
| Ret | (Italy) Gabriele Debbia | Aprilia | 6 | Collision | |
| Ret | (France) Frederic Petit | Yamaha | 6 | Collision | |
| Ret | (Spain) Emilio Alzamora | Honda | 4 | Retirement | |
| Ret | (Germany) Peter Öttl | Aprilia | 3 | Accident Damage | |
| Ret | (Netherlands) Loek Bodelier | Honda | 2 | Retirement | |
| Ret | (Italy) Daniela Tognoli | Aprilia | 2 | Retirement | |
| Ret | (Italy) Stefano Perugini | Aprilia | 1 | Retirement | |
| Ret | (Japan) Yoshiaki Katoh | Yamaha | 0 | Retirement | |
| DNS | (Spain) Carlos Giro | Aprilia | | Did not start | |

| Previous race: 1994 Australian Grand Prix | FIM Grand Prix World Championship; 1994 season | Next race: 1994 Japanese Grand Prix |
| Previous race: 1993 Malaysian Grand Prix | Malaysian Grand Prix | Next race: 1995 Malaysian Grand Prix |
