= 1994 Czech Republic motorcycle Grand Prix =

1994 motorcycle race in Brno, Czechia

1994 Czech Republic Grand Prix
Race details
- Race 11 of 14 races in the 1994 Grand Prix motorcycle racing season
- Date: 21 August 1994
- Official name: Grand Prix České Republiky
- Location: Brno Circuit
- Course: Permanent racing facility; 5.403 km (3.357 mi)

MotoGP
Pole position
- Rider: (Italy) Luca Cadalora
- Time: 2:02.380
Fastest lap
- Rider: (Japan) Shinichi Itoh
- Time: 2:03.544
Podium
- First: (Australia) Mick Doohan
- Second: (Japan) Shinichi Itoh
- Third: (Italy) Luca Cadalora

250cc
Pole position
- Rider: (Italy) Max Biaggi
- Time: 2:04.894
Fastest lap
- Rider: (Italy) Max Biaggi
- Time: 2:05.340
Podium
- First: (Italy) Max Biaggi
- Second: (Germany) Ralf Waldmann
- Third: (France) Jean-Philippe Ruggia

125cc
Pole position
- Rider: (Japan) Kazuto Sakata
- Time: 2:11.689
Fastest lap
- Rider: (Japan) Kazuto Sakata
- Time: 2:12.500
Podium
- First: (Japan) Kazuto Sakata
- Second: (Japan) Noboru Ueda
- Third: (Italy) Stefano Perugini

The 1994 Czech Republic motorcycle Grand Prix was the eleventh round of the 1994 Grand Prix motorcycle racing season. It took place on 21 August 1994 at the Masaryk Circuit located in Brno, Czech Republic.

Australian Mick Doohan would secure the first of his five consecutive world championships in the 500cc class by winning the race, as with three races to go, he could no longer be caught in the championship standings.

== 500 cc classification ==
Pos.	Rider	Team	Manufacturer	Time/Retired	Points
1	(Australia) Mick Doohan	Honda Team HRC	Honda	45:39.974	25
2	(Japan) Shinichi Itoh	Honda Team HRC	Honda	+3.322	20
3	(Italy) Luca Cadalora	Marlboro Team Roberts	Yamaha	+8.822	16
4	(Spain) Àlex Crivillé	Honda Team HRC	Honda	+23.136	13
5	(Spain) Alberto Puig	Ducados Honda Pons	Honda	+30.504	11
6	(Japan) Norifumi Abe	Mister Yumcha Blue Fox	Yamaha	+39.996	10
7	(United States) Kevin Schwantz	Lucky Strike Suzuki	Suzuki	+48.526	9
8	(Brazil) Alex Barros	Lucky Strike Suzuki	Suzuki	+55.796	8
9	(United Kingdom) Niall Mackenzie	Slick 50 Team WCM	ROC Yamaha	+56.504	7
10	(United Kingdom) Jeremy McWilliams	Millar Racing	Yamaha	+1:08.220	6
11	(France) Bernard Garcia	Yamaha Motor France	ROC Yamaha	+1:09.162	5
12	(United Kingdom) John Reynolds	Padgett's Motorcycles	Harris Yamaha	+1:10.328	4
13	(United Kingdom) Sean Emmett	Shell Harris Grand Prix	Harris Yamaha	+1:38.539	3
14	(France) Jean Foray	Jean Foray Racing Team	ROC Yamaha	+1:38.563	2
15	(France) Marc Garcia	DR Team Shark	ROC Yamaha	+1:38.627	1
16	(France) Jean Pierre Jeandat	JPJ Racing	ROC Yamaha	+1:40.832	
17	(Switzerland) Bernard Haenggeli	Haenggeli Racing	ROC Yamaha	+1:41.042	
18	(Italy) Cristiano Migliorati	Team Pedercini	ROC Yamaha	+1:56.688	
19	(Italy) Marco Papa	Team Elit	ROC Yamaha	+1 Lap	
20	(Netherlands) Cees Doorakkers	Team Doorakkers	Harris Yamaha	+1 Lap	
Ret	(United States) John Kocinski	Cagiva Team Agostini	Cagiva	Retirement	
Ret	(Spain) Juan Lopez Mella	Lopez Mella Racing Team	ROC Yamaha	Retirement	
Ret	(Belgium) Laurent Naveau	Euro Team	ROC Yamaha	Retirement	
Ret	(United States) Doug Chandler	Cagiva Team Agostini	Cagiva	Retirement	
Ret	(United Kingdom) Kevin Mitchell	MBM Racing	Harris Yamaha	Retirement	
Ret	(Italy) Lucio Pedercini	Team Pedercini	ROC Yamaha	Retirement	
Ret	(France) Bruno Bonhuil	MTD Objectif 500	ROC Yamaha	Retirement	
Ret	(Luxembourg) Andreas Leuthe	Team Doppler Austria	ROC Yamaha	Retirement	
Ret	(Germany) Michael Liedl	Team ROC	Harris Yamaha	Retirement	
DNQ	(Italy) Paul Pellissier	Team Paton	Team Paton	Did not qualify	

== 250 cc classification ==
Pos	Rider	Manufacturer	Time/Retired	Points
1	(Italy) Max Biaggi	Aprilia	42:09.445	25
2	(Germany) Ralf Waldmann	Honda	+6.425	20
3	(France) Jean Philippe Ruggia	Aprilia	+9.583	16
4	(Japan) Nobuatsu Aoki	Honda	+32.565	13
5	(Japan) Tadayuki Okada	Honda	+37.479	11
6	(France) Jean-Michel Bayle	Aprilia	+37.523	10
7	(Spain) Luis D'Antin	Honda	+42.634	9
8	(Switzerland) Eskil Suter	Aprilia	+42.996	8
9	(Netherlands) Wilco Zeelenberg	Honda	+47.548	7
10	(Austria) Andreas Preining	Aprilia	+57.443	6
11	(Spain) Luis Maurel	Honda	+57.995	5
12	(Netherlands) Patrick vd Goorbergh	Aprilia	+58.531	4
13	(Switzerland) Adrien Bosshard	Honda	+1:03.315	3
14	(Italy) Giuseppe Fiorillo	Honda	+1:24.497	2
15	(Spain) Juan Borja	Honda	+1:32.223	1
16	(United Kingdom) James Haydon	Honda	+1:32.833	
17	(France) Chrisrian Boudinot	Aprilia	+1:33.247	
18	(Germany) Jürgen Fuchs	Honda	+1:33.336	
19	(France) Noel Ferro	Honda	+1:33.977	
20	(France) Frederic Protat	Honda	+2:02.271	
21	(Finland) Krisse Kaas	Yamaha	+1 Lap	
22	(Spain) Enrique de Juan	Aprilia	+1 Lap	
23	(Canada) Rodney Fee	Honda	+1 Lap	
Ret	(Spain) Carlos Checa	Honda	Retirement	
Ret	(Netherlands) Jurgen vd Goorbergh	Aprilia	Retirement	
Ret	(Germany) Adolf Stadler	Honda	Retirement	
Ret	(Italy) Doriano Romboni	Honda	Retirement	
Ret	(Japan) Tetsuya Harada	Yamaha	Retirement	
Ret	(United States) Kenny Roberts Jr	Yamaha	Retirement	
Ret	(Spain) José Luis Cardoso	Aprilia	Retirement	
Ret	(Czech Republic) Bohumil Stasa Jr	Aprilia	Retirement	
Ret	(Italy) Alessandro Gramigni	Aprilia	Retirement	
Ret	(Italy) Loris Capirossi	Honda	Retirement	

== 125 cc classification ==
Pos	Rider	Manufacturer	Time/Retired	Points
1	(Japan) Kazuto Sakata	Aprilia	42:34.015	25
2	(Japan) Noboru Ueda	Honda	+2.639	20
3	(Italy) Stefano Perugini	Aprilia	+3.295	16
4	(Spain) Jorge Martinez	Yamaha	+3.397	13
5	(Japan) Takeshi Tsujimura	Honda	+14.431	11
6	(Japan) Masaki Tokudome	Honda	+14.569	10
7	(Germany) Dirk Raudies	Honda	+16.588	9
8	(Japan) Hideyuki Nakajo	Honda	+16.681	8
9	(Switzerland) Olivier Petrucciani	Aprilia	+16.737	7
10	(Germany) Manfred Geissler	Aprilia	+16.893	6
11	(Germany) Stefan Prein	Yamaha	+16.987	5
12	(Japan) Tomoko Igata	Honda	+29.597	4
13	(Spain) Carlos Giro	Aprilia	+29.723	3
14	(Netherlands) Loek Bodelier	Honda	+29.767	2
15	(Italy) Gianluigi Scalvini	Aprilia	+34.331	1
16	(Australia) Garry McCoy	Aprilia	+34.389	
17	(Italy) Lucio Cecchinello	Honda	+34.611	
18	(Italy) Luigi Ancona	Honda	+35.539	
19	(Japan) Haruchika Aoki	Honda	+37.397	
20	(Italy) Vittorio Lopez	Honda	+37.462	
21	(France) Frederic Petit	Yamaha	+50.300	
22	(Spain) Enrique Maturana	Yamaha	+52.345	
23	(Austria) Manfred Baumann	Yamaha	+57.350	
24	(Italy) Fausto Ricci	Aprilia	+1:07.917	
25	(France) Nicolas Dussauge	Honda	+1:42.003	
Ret	(Czech Republic) Jaroslav Hules	Honda	Retirement	
Ret	(Japan) Akira Saito	Honda	Retirement	
Ret	(United Kingdom) Neil Hodgson	Honda	Retirement	
Ret	(Spain) Herri Torrontegui	Aprilia	Retirement	
Ret	(Germany) Peter Öttl	Aprilia	Retirement	
Ret	(Spain) Emilio Alzamora	Honda	Retirement	
Ret	(Netherlands) Hans Spaan	Honda	Retirement	
Ret	(Italy) Massimiliano Gervasio	Honda	Retirement	
Ret	(Germany) Benjamin Weiss	Honda	Retirement	
Ret	(Germany) Oliver Koch	Honda	Retirement	

Previous race: 1994 British Grand Prix	FIM Grand Prix World Championship; 1994 season	Next race: 1994 United States Grand Prix
Previous race: 1993 Czech Republic Grand Prix	Czech Republic Grand Prix	Next race: 1995 Czech Republic Grand Prix
