= Doug Chandler =

American motorcycle racer

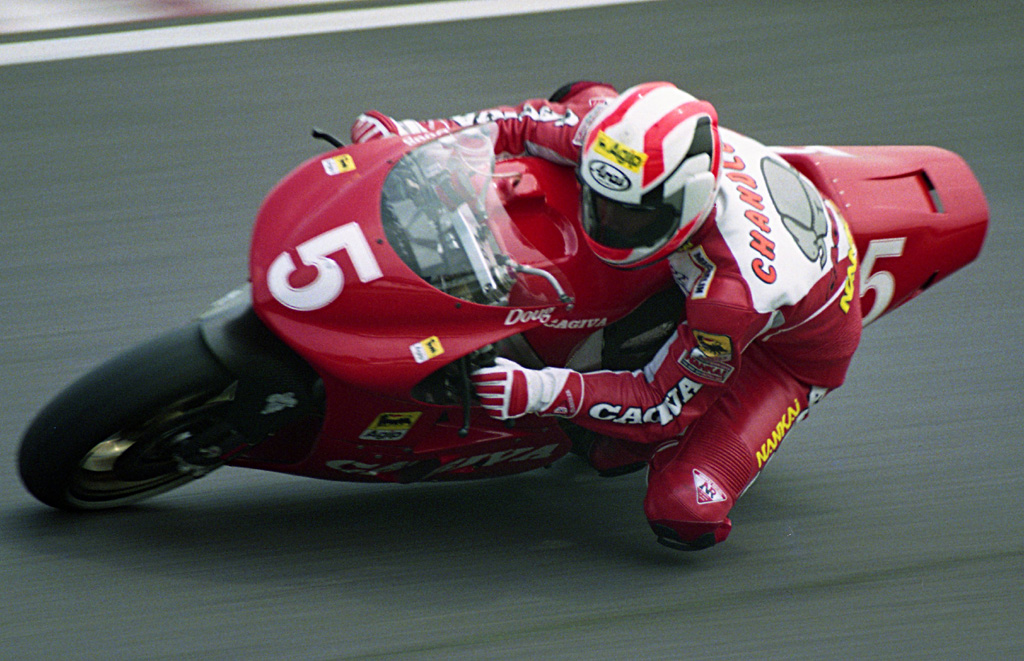
- Chandler at the 1993 Japanese Grand Prix.
- Nationality: United States
Motorcycle racing career statistics
Grand Prix motorcycle racing
Active years	1991 - 1994
First race	1991 500cc Japanese Grand Prix
Last race	1994 500cc European Grand Prix
Team(s)	Yamaha, Suzuki, Cagiva
Starts / Wins / Podiums / Poles / F. laps / Points; 54 / 0 / 6 / 2 / 0 / 358
Superbike World Championship
Active years	1989 - 1990, 1996 - 1998, 2001 - 2002
Manufacturers	Kawasaki
2002 championship position	32nd
Starts / Wins / Podiums / Poles / F. laps / Points; 14 / 2 / 5 / 1 / 1 / 120

John Douglas Chandler (born September 27, 1965) is an American former professional motorcycle racer. He earned a reputation as one of the most versatile racers of the 1980s and 1990s. Chandler is one of only four riders in AMA racing history to win the AMA Grand Slam, representing national wins at a mile, half-mile, short track, TT and road race. He was inducted into the AMA Motorcycle Hall of Fame in 2006.

== Motorcycle racing career ==
Born in Salinas, California, Chandler began competing in dirt track oval racing after experiencing success in motocross competitions. In 1983, he earned the prestigious AMA Rookie of the Year Award. His first-ever road race win was in 1988 in the Pro-Twins class at Mid-Ohio. He went on to take the AMA Superbike title in 1990 on a Muzzy Kawasaki, also taking World Superbike wins at Brainerd and Sugo that year.

In 1991, Chandler travelled to Europe to compete in the Grand Prix motorcycle racing series. He rode for former world champion Kenny Roberts on a satellite team aboard a Yamaha. He finished a respectable ninth in his first year on the Grand Prix circuit. He accepted a job from Suzuki in 1992 finishing fifth overall, only just behind experienced teammate Kevin Schwantz. Chandler spent 1993 and 1994 riding for the Cagiva team. He opened 1993 with a podium finish in Australia before things went sour and the team's support moved towards countryman John Kocinski.

After the 1994 Grand Prix season, Chandler left Europe and returned to the AMA Superbike series with Harley-Davidson. After a less than successful year in 1995 developing the Harley-Davidson superbike, he rejoined the Muzzy team for 1996, and won both the 1996 and 1997 AMA Superbike titles. As a result, he joined Fred Merkel and Reg Pridmore as three-time AMA Superbike champions. Despite a severe crash in World Superbike competition at Laguna Seca in 1998, he finished second overall to Ben Bostrom in the AMA Superbike championship. Chandler remained with Kawasaki until 2002, before a final year of road racing with Ducati. In 2003, Chandler tried his hand at Supermoto racing in the inaugural season of the AMA Supermoto Championship. Showing his impressive versatility, Chandler won a race in the new series.

Chandler currently runs motorcycle training courses. In 2015, he began working to assist with race control operations for the American Motorcyclist Association (AMA) sanctioned American motorcycle road racing series, MotoAmerica.

== Career statistics ==
=== Grand Prix motorcycle racing ===
==== By season ====
Season	Class	Motorcycle	Race	Win	Podium	Pole	FLap	Pts	Plcd
1991	500cc	Yamaha	15	0	0	0	0	85	9th
1992	500cc	Suzuki	13	0	4	2	0	94	5th
1993	500cc	Cagiva	12	0	1	0	0	83	10th
1994	500cc	Cagiva	14	0	1	0	0	96	9th
Total			**54**	**0**	**6**	**2**	**0**	**358**	

==== Races by year ====
(key) (Races in bold indicate pole position, races in italics indicate fastest lap)

Year	Class	Team	Bike	1	2	3	4	5	6	7	8	9	10	11	12	13	14	15	Pos.	Pts
1991	500cc	Team Roberts Yamaha/Castrol	YZR500	JPN; 11	AUS; 12	USA; Ret	SPA; 10	ITA; 6	GER; 9	AUT; 7	EUR; 9	NED; 11	FRA; 6	GBR; Ret	RSM; 9	CZE; 10	VDM; 7	MAL; Ret	9th	85
1992	500cc	Lucky Strike Suzuki 500	RGV500	JPN; 2	AUS; 5	MAL; 5	SPA; 10	ITA; 4	EUR; 3	GER; 8	NED; Ret	**HUN**; 2	**FRA**; Ret	GBR; Ret	BRA; 3	RSA; 4			5th	94
1993	500cc	Cagiva Team Agostini	C593	AUS; 3	MAL; 9	JPN; 11	SPA; Ret	AUT; 8	GER; 6	NED; 4	EUR; Ret	RSM; DNS	GBR; DNS	CZE; 9	ITA; 10	USA; Ret	FIM; 5		10th	83
1994	500cc	Cagiva Team Agostini	C594	AUS; 9	MAL; 9	JPN; 10	SPA; 7	AUT; Ret	GER; 7	NED; 6	ITA; Ret	FRA; Ret	GBR; 5	CZE; Ret	USA; 5	ARG; 2	EUR; 10		9th	96

=== Superbike World Championship ===
==== Races by year ====
Year	Make	1		2		3		4		5		6		7		8		9		10		11		12		13		Pos.	Pts
Year	Make	R1	R2	R1	R2	R1	R2	R1	R2	R1	R2	R1	R2	R1	R2	R1	R2	R1	R2	R1	R2	R1	R2	R1	R2	R1	R2	Pos.	Pts
1989	Kawasaki	GBR	GBR	HUN	HUN	CAN	CAN	USA; DNS	USA; 12	AUT	AUT	FRA	FRA	JPN	JPN	GER	GER	ITA	ITA	AUS	AUS	NZL	NZL					69th	4
1990	Kawasaki	SPA	SPA	GBR	GBR	HUN	HUN	GER	GER	CAN	CAN	**USA**; 3	**USA**; 1	AUT	AUT	JPN; 3	JPN; 1	FRA	FRA	ITA	ITA	MAL	MAL	AUS	AUS	NZL	NZL	15th	70
1996	Kawasaki	SMR	SMR	GBR	GBR	GER	GER	ITA	ITA	CZE	CZE	USA; Ret	USA; 6	EUR	EUR	INA	INA	JPN	JPN	NED	NED	SPA	SPA	AUS	AUS			29th	10
1997	Kawasaki	AUS	AUS	SMR	SMR	GBR	GBR	GER	GER	ITA	ITA	USA; 5	USA; Ret	EUR	EUR	AUT	AUT	NED	NED	SPA	SPA	JPN	JPN	INA	INA			35th	11
1998	Kawasaki	AUS	AUS	GBR	GBR	ITA	ITA	SPA	SPA	GER	GER	SMR	SMR	RSA	RSA	USA; 3	USA; DNS	EUR	EUR	AUT	AUT	NED	NED	JPN	JPN			32nd	8
2001	Kawasaki	SPA	SPA	RSA	RSA	AUS	AUS	JPN	JPN	ITA	ITA	GBR	GBR	GER	GER	SMR	SMR	USA; 9	USA; Ret	EUR	EUR	GER	GER	NED	NED	ITA	ITA	35th	7
2002	Ducati	SPA	SPA	AUS	AUS	RSA	RSA	JPN	JPN	ITA	ITA	GBR	GBR	GER	GER	SMR	SMR	USA; 13	USA; 9	GBR	GBR	GER	GER	NED	NED<	ITA	ITA	32nd	10

=== AMA Formula Xtreme Championship ===
==== By year ====
Year	Class	Bike	1	2	3	4	5	6	7	8	9	10	11	Pos	Pts
2004	Formula Xtreme	Ducati	DAY	FON	INF	BAR	PPK; 3	RAM; 4	BRD; 16	LAG; 6	M-O; 19	RAT; 3	VIR; 3	9th	166

Preceded by Miguel Duhamel	AMA Superbike Champion; 1996-1997	Succeeded by Ben Bostrom
Preceded by Jamie James	AMA Superbike Champion; 1990	Succeeded by Thomas Stevens
