= Jean-Philippe Ruggia =

French motorcycle racer

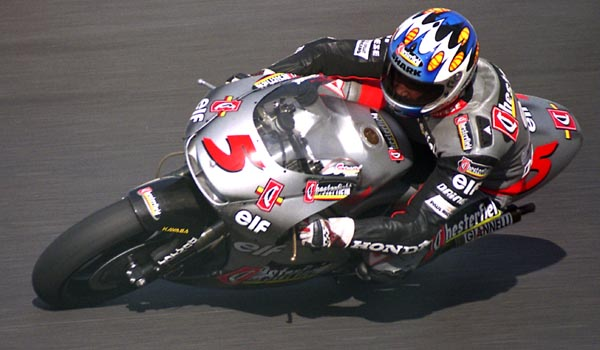
- Ruggia at the 1996 Japanese Grand Prix.
- Nationality: French
Motorcycle racing career statistics
Grand Prix motorcycle racing
Active years	1987 - 1996, 1998
First race	1987 250cc Japanese Grand Prix
Last race	1998 500cc Dutch TT
First win	1993 250cc British Grand Prix
Last win	1994 250cc Spanish Grand Prix
Team	Aprilia
Starts / Wins / Podiums / Poles / F. laps / Points; 138 / 3 / 10 / 2 / 2 / 899

Jean-Philippe Ruggia (born 1 October 1965 in Toulon) is a former Grand Prix motorcycle road racer from France. His best year was in 1995 when he finished in fifth place in the 250cc world championship. He won two races in 1993 riding for Aprilia and ended the season ranked sixth. He was also moderately successful in the 500cc class, finishing eighth overall in 1990. He is also the first rider known to use the elbow down riding style, years before Marc Márquez popularized the riding style in Grand Prix racing.

== Motorcycle Grand Prix Results ==
Points system from 1969 to 1987:

**Position**	1	2	3	4	5	6	7	8	9	10
**Points**	15	12	10	8	6	5	4	3	2	1

Points system from 1988 to 1992:

**Position**	1	2	3	4	5	6	7	8	9	10	11	12	13	14	15
**Points**	20	17	15	13	11	10	9	8	7	6	5	4	3	2	1

Points system from 1993 onwards:

**Position**	1	2	3	4	5	6	7	8	9	10	11	12	13	14	15
**Points**	25	20	16	13	11	10	9	8	7	6	5	4	3	2	1

(key) (Races in bold indicate pole position; races in italics indicate fastest lap)

Year	Class	Team	1	2	3	4	5	6	7	8	9	10	11	12	13	14	15	Points	Rank	Wins
1987	250cc	Sonauto-Yamaha	JPN; NC	ESP; 7	GER; 24	NAT; 17	AUT; 22	YUG; 11	NED; 26	FRA; 8	GBR; 14	SWE; NC	CZE; NC	RSM; 21	POR; 13	BRA; 19	ARG; NC	7	17th	0
1988	250cc	Sonauto-Yamaha	JPN; 7	USA; 13	ESP; 3	EXP; 5	NAT; 9	GER; 13	AUT; 13	NED; 11	BEL; 9	YUG; NC	FRA; 7	GBR; 6	SWE; 7	CZE; 11	BRA; 8	104	7th	0
1989	250cc	Sonauto-Yamaha	JPN; 5	**AUS**; 2	USA; 7	ESP; 3	NAT; 2	GER; 7	AUT; 8	YUG; 4	NED; NC	BEL; NC	**FRA**; 5	GBR -	SWE -	CZE -	BRA -	110	7th	0
1990	500cc	Sonauto-Yamaha	JPN; 8	USA; 5	ESP; 10	NAT; NC	GER; 6	AUT; 8	YUG; 5	NED; 11	BEL; 2	FRA; NC	GBR; 9	SWE; 7	CZE; 8	HUN; 6	AUS; NC	110	8th	0
1991	500cc	Sonauto-Yamaha	JPN; NC	AUS; 7	USA; 4	ESP; 5	ITA; 5	GER -	AUT -	EUR; 7	NED; 8	FRA; 5	GBR; NC	RSM; 10	CZE -	VDM; NC	MAL; NC	78	10th	0
1992	250cc	Gilera	JPN; NC	AUS; 9	MAL; NC	ESP; NC	ITA; NC	EUR; 10	GER; NC	NED; NC	HUN; NC	FRA; NC	GBR; NC	BRA; 12	RSA; 9			6	17th	0
1993	250cc	Aprilia	AUS; 9	MAL; 19	JPN; 5	ESP; 3	AUT; NC	GER; 8	NED; 4	EUR; 5	RSM; 4	GBR; 1	CZE; NC	ITA; 1	USA; NC	FIM; NC		129	6th	2
1994	250cc	Chesterfield-Aprilia	AUS; 4	MAL; 4	JPN; 7	ESP; 1	AUT; 6	GER; 8	NED; NC	ITA; 4	FRA; 7	GBR; 6	CZE; 3	USA; NC	ARG; 4	EUR; 6		149	6th	1
1995	250cc	Elf Tech 3-Honda	AUS; NC	MAL; 5	JPN; 5	ESP; 7	GER; 5	ITA; 9	NED; 4	FRA; 8	GBR; 5	CZE; 6	BRA; 6	ARG; 5	EUR; 13			115	5th	0
1996	250cc	Honda	MAL; 5	INA; 10	JPN; 10	ESP; 8	ITA; 7	FRA; NC	NED; NC	GER; 7	GBR; NC	AUT; 5	CZE; 6	IMO; NC	CAT; NC	BRA; 5	AUS; 6	91	9th	0
1998	500cc	MuZ-Weber	JPN -	MAL -	ESP -	ITA -	FRA -	MAD -	NED; NC	GBR -	GER -	CZE -	IMO -	CAT -	AUS -	ARG -		0	-	0
