= Cristiano Migliorati =

Italian motorcycle racer (born 1968)

- Nationality: Italian
Motorcycle racing career statistics
Grand Prix motorcycle racing
| Active years | 1994 - 1997 |
| First race | 1994 500cc Australian Grand Prix |
| Last race | 1997 250cc Australian Grand Prix |
| Championships | 0 |
Starts / Wins / Podiums / Poles / F. laps / Points; 57 / 0 / 0 / 0 / 0 / 114

Cristiano Migliorati (born 25 September 1968 in Brescia, Italy) is an Italian former Grand Prix motorcycle road racer. His best year was in 1996 when he finished 14th in the 250cc world championship. He was the 2004 Italian CIV Supersport Champion. He retired after the 2010 Italian CIV Supersport season.

== Grand Prix career statistics ==
Points system from 1993 onwards:

| **Position** | 1 | 2 | 3 | 4 | 5 | 6 | 7 | 8 | 9 | 10 | 11 | 12 | 13 | 14 | 15 |
| **Points** | 25 | 20 | 16 | 13 | 11 | 10 | 9 | 8 | 7 | 6 | 5 | 4 | 3 | 2 | 1 |

(key) (Races in bold indicate pole position; races in italics indicate fastest lap)

| Year | Class | Team | Machine | 1 | 2 | 3 | 4 | 5 | 6 | 7 | 8 | 9 | 10 | 11 | 12 | 13 | 14 | 15 | Points | Rank | Wins |
|---|---|---|---|---|---|---|---|---|---|---|---|---|---|---|---|---|---|---|---|---|---|
| 1994 | 500cc | Pedercini ROC-Yamaha | YZR500 | AUS; 15 | MAL; 20 | JPN; 20 | ESP; 12 | AUT; 14 | GER; NC | NED; NC | ITA; 12 | FRA; 15 | GBR; NC | CZE; 18 | USA; 17 | ARG; 16 | EUR; 18 | | 12 | 20th | 0 |
| 1995 | 500cc | Shell Harris-Yamaha | YZR500 | AUS; 14 | MAL; 12 | JPN; 18 | ESP; 10 | GER; 11 | ITA; NC | NED; 17 | FRA; NC | GBR; NC | CZE; NC | BRA; NC | ARG; 20 | EUR; 16 | | | 17 | 21st | 0 |
| 1996 | 250cc | Honda | NSR250 | MAL; 13 | INA; NC | JPN; NC | ESP; 13 | ITA; 10 | FRA; 9 | NED; 11 | GER; 9 | GBR; 9 | AUT; NC | CZE; 12 | IMO; NC | CAT; 8 | BRA; NC | AUS; NC | 50 | 14th | 0 |
| 1997 | 250cc | Honda | NSR250 | MAL; 8 | JPN; 22 | ESP; NC | ITA; NC | AUT; 16 | FRA; NC | NED; 13 | IMO; 13 | GER; 15 | BRA; 11 | GBR; NC | CZE; 9 | CAT; 16 | INA; 11 | AUS; 13 | 35 | 15th | 0 |

=== CIV Championship (Campionato Italiano Velocita) ===
==== Races by year ====
(key) (Races in bold indicate pole position; races in italics indicate fastest lap)

| Year | Class | Bike | 1 | 2 | 3 | 4 | 5 | Pos | Pts |
|---|---|---|---|---|---|---|---|---|---|
| 2002 | Supersport | Yamaha | IMO | VAL | MUG; 12 | MIS1; 11 | MIS2 | 20th | 9 |
