= 1994 Austrian motorcycle Grand Prix =

(Austria) 1994 Austrian Grand Prix
Race details
- Race 5 of 14 races in the 1994 Grand Prix motorcycle racing season
- Date: 22 May 1994
- Official name: Grand Prix Austria
- Location: Salzburgring
- Course: Permanent racing facility; 4.243 km (2.636 mi)

MotoGP
Pole position
- Rider: (Australia) Mick Doohan
- Time: 1:17.126
Fastest lap
- Rider: (Australia) Mick Doohan
- Time: 1:17.696
Podium
- First: (Australia) Mick Doohan
- Second: (United States) Kevin Schwantz
- Third: (Spain) Àlex Crivillé

250cc
Pole position
- Rider: (Italy) Max Biaggi
- Time: 1:21.312
Fastest lap
- Rider: (Italy) Loris Capirossi
- Time: 1:20.916
Podium
- First: (Italy) Loris Capirossi
- Second: (Italy) Max Biaggi
- Third: (Italy) Doriano Romboni

125cc
Pole position
- Rider: (Japan) Noboru Ueda
- Time: 1:29.076
Fastest lap
- Rider: (Germany) Dirk Raudies
- Time: 1:28.950
Podium
- First: (Germany) Dirk Raudies
- Second: (Japan) Noboru Ueda
- Third: (Australia) Garry McCoy

The 1994 Austrian motorcycle Grand Prix was the fifth round of the 1994 Grand Prix motorcycle racing season. It took place on 22 May 1994 at the Salzburgring.

== 500cc classification ==
Pos.	Rider	Team	Manufacturer	Laps	Time/Retired	Points
1	(Australia) Mick Doohan	Honda Team HRC	Honda	29	37:54.120	25
2	(United States) Kevin Schwantz	Lucky Strike Suzuki	Suzuki	29	+12.610	20
3	(Spain) Àlex Crivillé	Honda Team HRC	Honda	29	+15.432	16
4	(Japan) Shinichi Itoh	Honda Team HRC	Honda	29	+21.230	13
5	(United States) John Kocinski	Cagiva Team Agostini	Cagiva	29	+24.306	11
6	(Spain) Alberto Puig	Ducados Honda Pons	Honda	29	+28.928	10
7	(Brazil) Alex Barros	Lucky Strike Suzuki	Suzuki	29	+35.859	9
8	(Australia) Daryl Beattie	Marlboro Team Roberts	Yamaha	29	+54.577	8
9	(United Kingdom) Niall Mackenzie	Slick 50 Team WCM	ROC Yamaha	29	+1:10.906	7
10	(United Kingdom) John Reynolds	Padgett's Motorcycles	Harris Yamaha	28	+1 Lap	6
11	(France) Hervé Moineau	Team ROC	ROC Yamaha	28	+1 Lap	5
12	(United Kingdom) Sean Emmett	Shell Harris Grand Prix	Harris Yamaha	28	+1 Lap	4
13	(France) Jean Pierre Jeandat	JPJ Racing	ROC Yamaha	28	+1 Lap	3
14	(Italy) Cristiano Migliorati	Team Pedercini	Yamaha	28	+1 Lap	2
15	(Belgium) Laurent Naveau	Euro Team	ROC Yamaha	28	+1 Lap	1
16	(United Kingdom) Jeremy McWilliams	Millar Racing	Yamaha	28	+1 Lap	
17	(France) Bernard Garcia	DR Team Shark	ROC Yamaha	28	+1 Lap	
18	(Spain) Julián Miralles	Team ROC	ROC Yamaha	28	+1 Lap	
19	(France) Bruno Bonhuil	MTD Objectif 500	ROC Yamaha	28	+1 Lap	
20	(France) Jean Foray	Jean Foray Racing Team	ROC Yamaha	28	+1 Lap	
21	(United Kingdom) Kevin Mitchell	MBM Racing	Harris Yamaha	28	+1 Lap	
22	(Italy) Luca Cadalora	Marlboro Team Roberts	Yamaha	23	+6 Laps	
Ret	(United States) Doug Chandler	Cagiva Team Agostini	Yamaha	27	Retirement	
Ret	(Italy) Marco Papa	Team Elit	ROC Yamaha	26	Retirement	
Ret	(Netherlands) Cees Doorakkers	Team Doorakkers	Harris Yamaha	16	Retirement	
Ret	(Switzerland) Bernard Haenggeli	Haenggeli Racing	ROC Yamaha	15	Retirement	
Ret	(Italy) Lucio Pedercini	Team Pedercini	ROC Yamaha	14	Retirement	
Ret	(Spain) Juan López Mella	Lopez Mella Racing Team	ROC Yamaha	9	Mechanical	
Ret	(Luxembourg) Andreas Leuthe	Team Doppler Austria	ROC Yamaha	5	Retirement	
Ret	(Italy) Loris Reggiani	Aprilia Racing Team	Aprilia	1	Mechanical	
DNQ	(Italy) Vittorio Scatola	Team Paton	Paton		Did not qualify	
DNQ	(Germany) Lothar Neukirchen	Sachsen Racing Team	Harris Yamaha		Did not qualify	

== 250cc classification ==
Pos	Rider	Manufacturer	Laps	Time/Retired	Points
1	(Italy) Loris Capirossi	Honda	26	35:29.052	25
2	(Italy) Max Biaggi	Aprilia	26	+0.500	20
3	(Italy) Doriano Romboni	Honda	26	+19.434	16
4	(Japan) Tadayuki Okada	Honda	26	+19.604	13
5	(Germany) Ralf Waldmann	Honda	26	+19.883	11
6	(France) Jean Philippe Ruggia	Aprilia	26	+39.143	10
7	(Spain) Luis D'Antin	Honda	26	+54.470	9
8	(Netherlands) Patrick vd Goorbergh	Aprilia	26	+1:05.807	8
9	(Netherlands) Jurgen vd Goorbergh	Aprilia	26	+1:05.868	7
10	(Switzerland) Eskil Suter	Aprilia	26	+1:05.954	6
11	(France) Jean-Michel Bayle	Aprilia	26	+1:05.984	5
12	(Austria) Andreas Preining	Aprilia	26	+1:06.384	4
13	(Germany) Adolf Stadler	Honda	26	+1:20.822	3
14	(Germany) Bernd Kassner	Aprilia	25	+1 Lap	2
15	(Italy) Alessandro Gramigni	Aprilia	25	+1 Lap	1
16	(Italy) Giuseppe Fiorillo	Honda	25	+1 Lap	
17	(France) Frederic Protat	Honda	25	+1 Lap	
18	(Austria) Alexander Witting	Aprilia	25	+1 Lap	
19	(France) Christian Boudinot	Aprilia	25	+1 Lap	
20	(United Kingdom) Alan Patterson	Honda	25	+1 Lap	
21	(Spain) Enrique de Juan	Aprilia	25	+1 Lap	
22	(Austria) Hans Maxwald	Yamaha	25	+1 Lap	
23	(Canada) Rodney Fee	Honda	24	+2 Laps	
24	(Finland) Krisse Kaas	Yamaha	24	+2 Laps	
Ret	(Spain) José Luis Cardoso	Aprilia	10	Retirement	
Ret	(Netherlands) Wilco Zeelenberg	Honda	6	Retirement	
Ret	(Spain) Manuel Hernandez	Aprilia	6	Retirement	
Ret	(Japan) Nobuatsu Aoki	Honda	3	Retirement	
Ret	(France) Noel Ferro	Honda	2	Retirement	
Ret	(Japan) Tetsuya Harada	Yamaha	0	Mechanical	
Ret	(Spain) Carlos Checa	Honda	0	Mechanical	
Ret	(United States) Jim Filice	Yamaha	0	Mechanical	
DNS	(Spain) Luis Carlos Maurel	Honda		Did not start	

- Luis Carlos Maurel suffered a leg injury in a crash during practice and withdrew from the event.

== 125cc classification ==
Pos	Rider	Manufacturer	Laps	Time/Retired	Points
1	(Germany) Dirk Raudies	Honda	24	35:55.273	25
2	(Japan) Noboru Ueda	Honda	24	+4.001	20
3	(Australia) Garry McCoy	Aprilia	24	+4.232	16
4	(Germany) Peter Öttl	Aprilia	24	+16.007	13
5	(Japan) Kazuto Sakata	Aprilia	24	+16.047	11
6	(Italy) Stefano Perugini	Aprilia	24	+16.687	10
7	(Japan) Akira Saito	Honda	24	+16.905	9
8	(Italy) Fausto Gresini	Honda	24	+17.001	8
9	(Italy) Emilio Cuppini	Aprilia	24	+22.597	7
10	(Germany) Oliver Koch	Honda	24	+23.158	6
11	(Japan) Hideyuki Nakajo	Honda	24	+23.841	5
12	(Japan) Yoshiaki Katoh	Yamaha	24	+23.933	4
13	(Italy) Bruno Casanova	Honda	24	+23.994	3
14	(Spain) Herri Torrontegui	Aprilia	24	+24.065	2
15	(Switzerland) Olivier Petrucciani	Aprilia	24	+24.303	1
16	(Germany) Stefan Prein	Yamaha	24	+24.469	
17	(Spain) Jorge Martinez	Yamaha	24	+45.142	
18	(Netherlands) Loek Bodelier	Honda	24	+45.218	
19	(Italy) Lucio Cecchinello	Honda	24	+1:04.411	
20	(Italy) Gabriele Debbia	Aprilia	24	+1:04.536	
21	(Germany) Manfred Geissler	Aprilia	24	+1:04.738	
22	(Spain) Emilio Alzamora	Honda	24	+1:04.899	
23	(Netherlands) Hans Spaan	Honda	24	+1:29.501	
24	(France) Frédéric Petit	Yamaha	24	+1:29.502	
25	(Japan) Haruchika Aoki	Honda	24	+1:29.558	
26	(Italy) Vittorio Lopez	Honda	24	+1:29.883	
27	(United Kingdom) Neil Hodgson	Honda	24	+1:29.995	
28	(Spain) Carlos Giro	Aprilia	24	+1:30.408	
29	(France) Nicolas Dussauge	Honda	23	+1 Lap	
30	(Austria) Manfred Baumann	Yamaha	23	+1 Lap	
31	(Austria) Gerwin Hofer	Honda	23	+1 Lap	
32	(Austria) Georg Scharl	Honda	23	+1 Lap	
Ret	(Japan) Tomoko Igata	Honda	12	Accident	
Ret	(Japan) Masaki Tokudome	Honda	5	Mechanical	
Ret	(Japan) Takeshi Tsujimura	Honda	1	Accident	
DNQ	(Japan) Masafumi Ono	Honda		Did not qualify	

- Tomoko Igata crashed in the final corner and suffered a broken leg which ruled her out of the next three rounds of the championship.

Previous race: 1994 Spanish Grand Prix	FIM Grand Prix World Championship; 1994 season	Next race: 1994 German Grand Prix
Previous race: 1993 Austrian Grand Prix	Austrian Grand Prix	Next race: 1996 Austrian Grand Prix
