= 1994 Japanese motorcycle Grand Prix =

(Japan) 1994 Japanese Grand Prix
Race details
- Race 3 of 14 races in the 1994 Grand Prix motorcycle racing season
- Date: 24 April 1994
- Official name: Marlboro Grand Prix of Japan
- Location: Suzuka Circuit
- Course: Permanent racing facility; 5.821 km (3.617 mi)

MotoGP
Pole position
- Rider: (Italy) Luca Cadalora
- Time: 2:08.336
Fastest lap
- Rider: (United States) Kevin Schwantz
- Time: 2:09.439
Podium
- First: (United States) Kevin Schwantz
- Second: (Australia) Mick Doohan
- Third: (Japan) Shinichi Itoh

250cc
Pole position
- Rider: (Italy) Max Biaggi
- Time: 2:10.876
Fastest lap
- Rider: (Italy) Max Biaggi
- Time: 2:12.187 on lap 18
Podium
- First: (Japan) Tadayuki Okada
- Second: (Italy) Loris Capirossi
- Third: (Japan) Tohru Ukawa

125cc
Pole position
- Rider: (Japan) Noboru Ueda
- Time: 2:19.133
Fastest lap
- Rider: (Japan) Kazuto Sakata
- Time: 2:18.756 on lap 12
Podium
- First: (Japan) Takeshi Tsujimura
- Second: (Japan) Kazuto Sakata
- Third: (Japan) Hideyuki Nakajo

The 1994 Japanese motorcycle Grand Prix was the third round of the 1994 Grand Prix motorcycle racing season. It took place on 24 April 1994 at the Suzuka Circuit.

== 500cc race report ==
This race was most notable for the four-way battle for the win, home hero Norick Abe bravely fighting and leading the race until he crashed out of contention and Kevin Schwantz' recovery drive to victory. Valentino Rossi claimed that this was one of his favourite races due to Norifumi's fighting spirit and Rossi assumed the nickname Rossifumi in the early stages of his career.

Luca Cadalora has taken pole position on the Saturday with a time of 2:08.336. Wildcard rider Toshihiko Honma qualified in second place and Kevin Schwantz lines up third.

The riders all go through the warm-up lap and then line up on their respective grid slots. As the lights go out, Cadalora has a fantastic start and retains the lead. Big mover is Àlex Crivillé who shoots past many riders from tenth, slotting into second entering the First Corner (Turn 1). Wildcard rider Honma loses one place as he gets overtaken at the end of the start/finish straight and is now third. Niall Mackenzie also makes up many places from twelfth, fighting with Honma at the First Corner before taking the position at Snake (Turn 3). Schwantz has lost multiple places from third place and is eighth at Dunlop corner, battling with another Honma on the opening lap. As early as Snake, Cadalora has pulled a relatively big gap back to Honma. At Degner (Turn 9), fifth place Alex Barros runs a bit wide, allowing sixth place Norifumi Abe to pass him at the unnamed right-hand kink (Turn 10) before the Hairpin (Turn 11). At the Casio Triangle (Turn 15), Mick Doohan and Schwantz go up the inside of Abe and Honma for second and seventh place.

On lap two, the top six is as follows: Cadalora, Crivillé, Doohan, Abe, Mackenzie and Barros. At Snake (Turn 5), Schwantz lunges down the inside of Barros and overtakes him for sixth position. At the entrance of Dunlop, Doohan dives down the inside of teammate Crivillé and snatches seventh place away from him, with Abe having a look around the outside. Behind the trio, Schwantz is also very close to Mackenzie, not yet being able to go past. At the exit of Dunlop and the start of the short straight before Degner (Turn 8), the American passes Mackenzie, promoting him to fifth. Cadalora at the front is still extending his lead meanwhile. At the Spoon Curve (Turn 13), Abe goes through on Crivillé for third place. Schwantz also passes the Spaniard and moves up to fourth.

Lap three and Schwantz slowly closes up on Abe throughout the lap. He then tries a lunge at the Hairpin but isn't able to make the move, almost hitting the Japanese whilst doing so. Exiting Spoon Curve, Schwantz has a bit of a moment which causes him to lose some time. He tries again at the Casio Triangle but again isn't able to pull it off.

On lap four, Abe makes a move on Doohan by braking later than him at the entrance of the First Corner, causing him to lose both his front and rear but still managing to make the pass and stay ahead. Doohan however immediately replies, retaking the position back at Snake. This also allows Schwantz to get closer to the duo. As Abe is still very close behind Doohan, Mackenzie and Daryl Beattie get a one minute penalty for a jump start. Exiting the Casio Triangle (Turn 17) and heading onto the start/finish straight, Abe looks to be making a pass but just misses the speed to do so, having to slot in behind Doohan again.

Lap five and Abe tries another move at the entrance of the First Corner but once again fails. At the Hairpin, Schwantz closes right up on Abe, who has a slight twitch exiting the hairpin. At the Backstretch coming up to 130R (Turn 14), he goes side-by-side with the Japanese and goes up into third.

On lap six, Abe tries to take back the position but once again lacks the speed to do so, having to stay behind the American for now. The trio is now also slowly starting to catch Cadalora again. Behind them, fifth place Shinichi Ito is also starting to catch the group of Doohan, Schwantz and Abe as well. At the Casio Triangle, Schwantz makes a lunge up Doohan's inside entering the corner, passing him and moving up to second position.

Lap seven and Doohan slipstreams past Schwantz again, making good use of his superior top speed to overtake the Lucky Strike Suzuki at the start/finish to retake second. The trio is still slowly catching Cadalora. At the Hairpin, Schwantz tries another lunge but has to stay behind the Australian for the time being.

On lap eight, Doohan starts to pull a small gap to Schwantz with Cadalora still losing more ground to the trio. Abe has a slight moment entering Dunlop but doesn't lose any time or positions from it. Schwantz closes up on Doohan halfway across the lap, then lines up a pass by lunging down his inside at the entrance of the Hairpin, closing the door and taking second position away from the Honda Team HRC rider. At the 200R, Doohan looks to be retaking the position from Schwantz by going up the inside upon entry, but the American takes a wider line and then a shorter one exiting the corner, holding off Doohan and keeping the position entering the Spoon Curve. At the Backstretch, Doohan then goes side-by-side and overtakes Schwantz again on speed before entering the 130R. Then, at the Casio Triangle, both Schwantz and Abe make a pass: Schwantz overtaking Doohan for second and Abe, initially trying to pass Schwantz, snatches third from a helpless Doohan as they enter the chicane, the Australian losing two positions in one corner. Exiting the chicane, Abe then has another slight moment.

Lap nine and Abe now passes Schwantz at the start/finish straight, entering the First Corner, taking second place away from the American. Schwantz then tries to repass him by taking a shorter line but thinks better of it, looking behind to see where Doohan is. At Snake, Doohan is right behind him and passes Schwantz to relegate him to fourth. Now it is Schwantz who has lost two places in two corners. Halfway into the Dunlop corner, Abe has a big moment that unsettles him, then Doohan has a slight moment exiting the sweeping left-hander as well. At the 200R, Abe has another moment but has now opened up a gap. At the Casio Triangle, Schwantz closes up on Doohan but isn't quite able to make a move on him.

On lap ten, Abe has almost caught race leader Cadalora. The top six is as follows: Cadalora, Abe, Doohan, Schwantz, Ito and Barros. At Dunlop, Abe has another slight moment but has now fully caught up to the rear of Cadalora. At the Hairpin, Schwantz is once again very close behind Doohan, who then runs wide and gifts the American third place. Abe is now very close and tries to pass the Italian around the outside at the fast 200R corner, not quite able to. Behind them, Schwantz has to defend his own position from a fast charging Doohan again. At the Spoon Curve Abe then lunges up the inside of Cadalora but runs wide, allowing Cadalora to come right back at him. The pair go side-by-side as they exit the corner and Cadalora manages to get ahead. However, Abe then makes the definitive pass on the Italian at the Backstretch, comfortably passing him and taking over the lead of the race, much to the joy of the Japanese fans in the grandstands who start to cheer. Cadalora then has a huge moment exiting 130R, almost losing his bike in the process. This allows Schwantz - who has shaken off Doohan's attack earlier - to close right up at the Casio Triangle.

Lap eleven and wildcard rider and home hero Abe leads the Japanese Grand Prix. Schwantz goes side-by-side with Cadalora and takes second position from the Italian before the First Corner. Exiting the Anti-Banked Curve (Turn 6), Abe has another slight moment that unsettles his bike. Beattie exits the pit lane, having served his one minute penalty. Doohan has also managed to overtake Cadalora, moving him up to third. Ito has also closed the gap and is now right behind Cadalora, making it a five-way battle for victory. At the Backstretch, Schwantz and Ito are very close and both make a pass: Schwantz overtakes Abe for the lead and Ito takes fourth position from Cadalora. Abe tries to get back at him entering the Casio Triangle but Doohan swiftly denies him.

On lap twelve, Abe is still right behind Schwantz but this time isn't able to pass him on the start/finish straight. Ito has opened up a gap to a now struggling Cadalora and is on his way to try and catch teammate Doohan. The group approaches a backmarker - Lothar Neukirchen - but manage to get by without any major problems. Halfway through Dunlop, Abe has a huge moment that forces him to go wide and lose second position to Doohan. At the Hairpin, Ito goes slightly wide, making him lose touch with Abe. Entering the 200R, Abe is still close to Doohan and looks if he can make a move at Spoon Curve but thinks better of it. The fighting has allowed Schwantz to open up a relatively big gap to Doohan at the front.

Lap thirteen and Abe is now right behind Doohan, going up his inside and retaking second at the entrance of the First Corner, the Japanese fans cheering him on as he does so. After the move, he then opens up a small gap to the Australian. At the Backstretch, Doohan goes side-by-side with Abe and takes second position back on speed. However, Abe has a much better exit out of 130R, goes alongside Doohan and passes him on the outside at the entrance of the Casio Triangle, promoting him up to second place again.

On lap fourteen, the top six is as follows: Schwantz, Abe, Doohan, Ito, Cadalora and Barros. Halfway into the lap, Ito has now almost caught teammate Doohan. Right before the entrance of Spoon Curve, Ito has a slight moment. Coming up to the Casio Triangle, Schwantz overtakes another backmarker, this time being Andreas Leuthe. Exiting the chicane, Abe and Doohan pass him without any problems.

Lap fifteen and Ito does not manage to get past Leuthe easily, being blocked upon entry of the First Corner for a moment. This has lost him valuable time to Doohan. Ito has a slight moment halfway into Dunlop. Schwantz then nearly hits a backmarker - Bernard Haenggeli - exiting Degner, him then sitting upright and looking back to see Abe, Doohan and Ito pass him. The incident has allowed Abe to close right up to Schwantz - who had opened up a gap to the Japanese rider. Coming up to the Spoon Curve, Abe then makes a late lunge and outbrakes Schwantz, going a bit wide but still being able to keep first place. Doohan then overtakes Schwantz for second position at the Backstretch, the American looking back to see where he is and making him lose some speed to Doohan. At the Casio Triangle, Schwantz then lunges up the inside of Doohan and comfortably retakes second place back, closing right back up to Abe as well.

On lap sixteen, Schwantz looks to be passing Abe for the lead but it is instead Doohan who takes over at the front, using the slipstream of both Abe and Schwantz, as well as his Honda power, to blast past and lead going into the First Corner. Abe retains second and Schwantz gets relegated to third. Schwantz has not given up however and stays close behind Abe, the American going up the inside of Abe and moving up to second entering Dunlop. At Turn 10 before the Hairpin, Schwantz looks to be passing Doohan but gets blocked off, the Australian forcing him to stay behind for now. All the fighting has allowed Ito to once again close up, making it a four-way battle for the win. Schwantz then tries to make a move on Doohan at the beginning of Spoon Curve, only to fail and give the momentum to Abe who then runs a bit wide upon exit himself, thus not being able to make a move on the American. At the Casio Triangle, Schwantz then lunges up the inside of Doohan and comfortably passes him before the entrance of the corner.

Lap seventeen and Schwantz is now fully back in the lead. Ito closes up to the back of Abe and tries to look up his inside entering Dunlop but thinks better of it. The group passes another backmarker - who goes out of the way without any problems before Turn 10. At the entrance of the Casio Triangle, Abe closes up on Doohan and Ito closes up on Abe, neither making a move.

On lap eighteen, Schwantz has now opened up a gap to Doohan. Ito then looks up Abe's inside again at the entrance of Dunlop, not making a move for now. At the Hairpin, Abe closes right up to Doohan, taking the outside line at the 200R, then switching to the inside and passing Doohan for second. The Australian tries to get him back by outbraking him but has to stay behind Abe entering Spoon Curve. Ito then almost manages to snatch third away from his teammate as well, opting to stay behind for now. At the Backstretch, Doohan then retakes the position thanks to his superior top-end speed. However, exiting the 130R and coming up the Casio Triangle, Abe makes a very late lunge, his bike sliding a bit as he does so, moving alongside Doohan and taking back second position from him entering the corner. Exiting the chicane, Schwantz has passed another backmarker.

Lap nineteen and the top six is as follows: Schwantz, Abe, Doohan, Ito, Cadalora and Honma. However, entering the First Corner, Abe loses the front end and crashes out at high speed, tumbling through the gravel and almost hitting the tyre barrier as a result. A confused Abe is seen lying on his front in the gravel next to his destroyed motorbike, the marshalls running up to him to make sure he is alright and waving the yellow flag. Luckily, the rider is unhurt and walks away, albeit very disappointed to have crashed out on his home race. His crash promotes Doohan to second, Ito to third, Cadalora to fourth, Honma to fifth and Barros to sixth place. Doohan now has clear road ahead of him, allowing him to pull a small gap to his teammate.

On lap twenty, the penultimate lap, Doohan starts to push to try and catch leader Schwantz. Further back, Barros has retaken fifth from Honma and the top six is now as follows: Schwantz, Doohan, Ito, Cadalora, Barros and Honma. Schwantz passes another backmarker, this time being Marc Garcia at the Backstretch without problems.

The final lap - lap twenty-one - has begun and Schwantz has two more backmarkers to pass - Jean Pierre Jeandat and Cristiano Migliorati. He does so without problems, even waving at the crowd for a split second before he enters Dunlop. Doohan behind him has now opened up a significant gap back to teammate Ito. At the Casio Triangle, the fans cheer for Schwantz as he goes through, crossing the line in jubilant fashion - doing a wheelie - to win his first race of the year. Behind him, Doohan finishes in second and Ito in third place, the home fans cheering for him as he crosses the line. Cadalora crosses the line in fourth, Barros in fifth and Honma in sixth.

On the parade lap back to parc-fermé, Schwantz carries the American flag as some fans invade the track. He celebrates by punching up in and kicking the air with his leg, the Japanese fans clapping for him in return.

On the podium, the trophies are being handed out. Schwantz get his first, raising it up in the air gleefully. Doohan then gets his, followed by Ito. As the American national anthem starts for Schwantz, Doohan laughs and Ito looks down with crossed arms in respect. The trio then gets the champagne, Schwantz spraying Ito and Doohan spraying Schwantz before spraying the camera.

== 500 cc classification ==
Pos.	Rider	Team	Manufacturer	Laps	Time/Retired	Points
1	(United States) Kevin Schwantz	Lucky Strike Suzuki	Suzuki	21	45:49.996	25
2	(Australia) Mick Doohan	Honda Team HRC	Honda	21	+3.474	20
3	(Japan) Shinichi Itoh	Honda Team HRC	Honda	21	+7.989	16
4	(Italy) Luca Cadalora	Marlboro Team Roberts	Yamaha	21	+28.016	13
5	(Brazil) Alex Barros	Lucky Strike Suzuki	Suzuki	21	+36.543	11
6	(Japan) Toshihiko Honma	YRTR	Yamaha	21	+37.325	10
7	(Spain) Àlex Crivillé	Honda Team HRC	Honda	21	+41.947	9
8	(Spain) Alberto Puig	Ducados Honda Pons	Honda	21	+54.765	8
9	(United States) John Kocinski	Cagiva Team Agostini	Cagiva	21	+59.380	7
10	(United States) Doug Chandler	Cagiva Team Agostini	Cagiva	21	+1:11.706	6
11	(France) Bernard Garcia	Yamaha Motor France	ROC Yamaha	21	+1:29.838	5
12	(United Kingdom) John Reynolds	Padgett's Motorcycles	Harris Yamaha	21	+1:35.410	4
13	(United Kingdom) Jeremy McWilliams	Millar Racing	Yamaha	21	+1:54.792	3
14	(Belgium) Laurent Naveau	Euro Team	ROC Yamaha	21	+1:58.497	2
15	(Spain) Juan López Mella	Lopez Mella Racing Team	ROC Yamaha	21	+2:07.616	1
16	(France) Bruno Bonhuil	MTD Objectif 500	ROC Yamaha	21	+2:10.228	
17	(United Kingdom) Sean Emmett	Shell Harris Grand Prix	Harris Yamaha	21	+2:12.308	
18	(Italy) Lucio Pedercini	Team Pedercini	Yamaha	21	+2:12.868	
19	(United Kingdom) Niall Mackenzie	Slick 50 Team WCM	ROC Yamaha	21	+2:30.714	
20	(Italy) Cristiano Migliorati	Team Pedercini	ROC Yamaha	20	+1 Lap	
21	(France) Jean Pierre Jeandat	JPJ Racing	ROC Yamaha	20	+1 Lap	
22	(France) Marc Garcia	DR Team Shark	ROC Yamaha	20	+1 Lap	
23	(France) Jean Foray	Jean Foray Racing Team	ROC Yamaha	20	+1 Lap	
24	(Spain) Julián Miralles	Team ROC	ROC Yamaha	20	+1 Lap	
25	(Switzerland) Bernard Haenggeli	Haenggeli Racing	ROC Yamaha	20	+1 Lap	
26	(Luxembourg) Andreas Leuthe	Team Doppler Austria	ROC Yamaha	20	+1 Lap	
27	(Germany) Lothar Neukirchner	Sachsen Racing Team	Harris Yamaha	20	+1 Lap	
28	(Australia) Daryl Beattie	Marlboro Team Roberts	Yamaha	18	+3 Laps	
Ret	(Japan) Norifumi Abe	Mister Yumcha Blue Fox	Honda	18	Accident	
Ret	(Netherlands) Cees Doorakkers	Team Doorakkers	Harris Yamaha	12	Retirement	

== 250 cc classification ==
Pos	Rider	Manufacturer	Laps	Time/Retired	Points
1	(Japan) Tadayuki Okada	Honda	19	42:28.242	25
2	(Italy) Loris Capirossi	Honda	19	+0.128	20
3	(Japan) Tohru Ukawa	Honda	19	+0.314	16
4	(Italy) Max Biaggi	Aprilia	19	+2.109	13
5	(Japan) Takuma Aoki	Honda	19	+3.841	11
6	(Italy) Doriano Romboni	Honda	19	+10.296	10
7	(France) Jean Philippe Ruggia	Aprilia	19	+15.659	9
8	(Japan) Nobuatsu Aoki	Honda	19	+39.107	8
9	(Japan) Tetsuya Harada	Yamaha	19	+49.757	7
10	(Spain) Luis D'Antin	Honda	19	+50.760	6
11	(France) Jean-Michel Bayle	Aprilia	19	+1:12.534	5
12	(Netherlands) Jurgen vd Goorbergh	Aprilia	19	+1:21.583	4
13	(Netherlands) Patrick vd Goorbergh	Aprilia	19	+1:24.332	3
14	(Germany) Adolf Stadler	Honda	19	+1:24.918	2
15	(Switzerland) Eskil Suter	Aprilia	19	+1:43.592	1
16	(Spain) Luis Maurel	Honda	19	+1:43.783	
17	(France) Frederic Protat	Honda	19	+1:44.503	
18	(Italy) Giuseppe Fiorillo	Honda	19	+1:44.670	
19	(Germany) Bernd Kassner	Aprilia	19	+2:00.651	
20	(France) Noel Ferro	Honda	19	+2:18.631	
21	(Austria) Andreas Preining	Aprilia	19	+2:22.214	
22	(Spain) Enrique de Juan	Aprilia	18	+1 Lap	
23	(Finland) Krisse Kaas	Yamaha	18	+1 Lap	
Ret	(Spain) Carlos Checa	Honda	14	Accident	
Ret	(Germany) Ralf Waldmann	Honda	6	Accident	
Ret	(Italy) Alessandro Gramigni	Aprilia	5	Accident	
Ret	(United Kingdom) Alan Patterson	Honda	5	Mechanical	
Ret	(Spain) José Luis Cardoso	Aprilia	3	Accident	
Ret	(France) Christian Boudinot	Aprilia	3	Accident	
Ret	(Canada) Rodney Fee	Honda	1	Accident	
Ret	(Switzerland) Adrien Bosshard	Honda	0	Accident	
Ret	(Netherlands) Wilco Zeelenberg	Honda	0	Accident	
Ret	(United States) Jim Filice	Yamaha	0	Accident	
Ret	(Spain) Juan Borja	Aprilia	0	Retirement	

== 125cc classification ==
Pos	Rider	Manufacturer	Laps	Time/Retired	Points
1	(Japan) Takeshi Tsujimura	Honda	18	42:13.168	25
2	(Japan) Kazuto Sakata	Aprilia	18	+0.670	20
3	(Japan) Hideyuki Nakajo	Honda	18	+13.352	16
4	(Germany) Peter Öttl	Aprilia	18	+15.923	13
5	(Japan) Akira Saito	Honda	18	+18.234	11
6	(Japan) Masaki Tokudome	Honda	18	+18.316	10
7	(Spain) Jorge Martinez	Yamaha	18	+40.058	9
8	(Spain) Herri Torrontegui	Aprilia	18	+40.231	8
9	(Australia) Garry McCoy	Aprilia	18	+59.366	7
10	(Italy) Bruno Casanova	Honda	18	+59.724	6
11	(Netherlands) Loek Bodelier	Honda	18	+1:10.719	5
12	(Japan) Kunihiro Amano	Honda	18	+1:17.650	4
13	(Germany) Oliver Koch	Honda	18	+1:21.302	3
14	(Germany) Manfred Geissler	Aprilia	18	+1:23.632	2
15	(Germany) Stefan Prein	Yamaha	18	+1:24.256	1
16	(Spain) Emilio Alzamora	Honda	18	+1:27.688	
17	(Japan) Haruchika Aoki	Honda	18	+1:33.790	
18	(Italy) Fausto Gresini	Honda	18	+1:37.768	
19	(Italy) Stefano Perugini	Aprilia	18	+1:43.432	
20	(Spain) Carlos Giro	Aprilia	18	+1:43.972	
21	(Italy) Gabriele Debbia	Aprilia	18	+1:56.738	
22	(Austria) Manfred Baumann	Yamaha	18	+2:05.170	
23	(France) Frederic Petit	Yamaha	18	+2:05.290	
24	(Japan) Masafumo Ono	Honda	18	+2:24.942	
Ret	(Japan) Noboru Ueda	Honda	17	Accident	
Ret	(Japan) Tomoko Igata	Honda	14	Mechanical	
Ret	(Japan) Hiroyuki Kikuchi	Honda	14	Retirement	
Ret	(Switzerland) Olivier Petrucciani	Aprilia	11	Accident	
Ret	(Italy) Daniela Tognoli	Aprilia	6	Retirement	
Ret	(United Kingdom) Neil Hodgson	Honda	5	Retirement	
Ret	(Netherlands) Hans Spaan	Honda	5	Retirement	
Ret	(Germany) Dirk Raudies	Honda	4	Mechanical	
Ret	(Italy) Lucio Cecchinello	Honda	0	Accident	
Ret	(Italy) Vittorio Lopez	Honda	0	Retirement	

Previous race: 1994 Malaysian Grand Prix	FIM Grand Prix World Championship; 1994 season	Next race: 1994 Spanish Grand Prix
Previous race: 1993 Japanese Grand Prix	Japanese Grand Prix	Next race: 1995 Japanese Grand Prix
