= 1994 Spanish motorcycle Grand Prix =

(Spain) 1994 Spanish Grand Prix
Race details
- Race 4 of 14 races in the 1994 Grand Prix motorcycle racing season
- Date: 8 May 1994
- Official name: Gran Premio de España
- Location: Circuito de Jerez
- Course: Permanent racing facility; 4.428 km (2.751 mi)

MotoGP
Pole position
- Rider: (United States) Kevin Schwantz
- Time: 1:43.944
Fastest lap
- Rider: (United States) Kevin Schwantz
- Time: 1:44.168 on lap 27
Podium
- First: (Australia) Mick Doohan
- Second: (United States) Kevin Schwantz
- Third: (United States) John Kocinski

250cc
Pole position
- Rider: (Italy) Loris Capirossi
- Time: 1:44.928
Fastest lap
- Rider: (Italy) Max Biaggi
- Time: 1:45.628
Podium
- First: (France) Jean-Philippe Ruggia
- Second: (Italy) Doriano Romboni
- Third: (Japan) Tadayuki Okada

125cc
Pole position
- Rider: (Japan) Kazuto Sakata
- Time: 1:50.210
Fastest lap
- Rider: (Germany) Peter Öttl
- Time: 1:51.333
Podium
- First: (Japan) Kazuto Sakata
- Second: (Germany) Peter Öttl
- Third: (Spain) Herri Torrontegui

The 1994 Spanish motorcycle Grand Prix was the fourth round of the 1994 Grand Prix motorcycle racing season. It took place on 8 May 1994 at the Circuito Permanente de Jerez.

== 500 cc classification ==
Pos.	Rider	Team	Manufacturer	Laps	Time/Retired	Points
1	(Australia) Mick Doohan	Honda Team HRC	Honda	27	47:31.082	25
2	(United States) Kevin Schwantz	Lucky Strike Suzuki	Suzuki	27	+0.489	20
3	(United States) John Kocinski	Cagiva Team Agostini	Cagiva	27	+9.265	16
4	(Brazil) Alex Barros	Lucky Strike Suzuki	Suzuki	27	+13.258	13
5	(Spain) Àlex Crivillé	Honda Team HRC	Honda	27	+14.825	11
6	(Spain) Alberto Puig	Ducados Honda Pons	Honda	27	+21.122	10
7	(United States) Doug Chandler	Cagiva Team Agostini	Cagiva	27	+38.792	9
8	(United Kingdom) Niall Mackenzie	Slick 50 Team WCM	ROC Yamaha	27	+40.359	8
9	(Italy) Loris Reggiani	Aprilia Racing Team	Aprilia	27	+45.666	7
10	(United Kingdom) John Reynolds	Padgett's Motorcycles	Harris Yamaha	27	+1:25.292	6
11	(United Kingdom) Jeremy McWilliams	Millar Racing	Yamaha	26	+1 Lap	5
12	(Italy) Cristiano Migliorati	Team Pedercini	ROC Yamaha	26	+1 Lap	4
13	(Spain) Juan López Mella	Lopez Mella Racing Team	ROC Yamaha	26	+1 Lap	3
14	(France) Jean Pierre Jeandat	JPJ Racing	ROC Yamaha	26	+1 Lap	2
15	(Spain) Julián Miralles	Team ROC	ROC Yamaha	26	+1 Lap	1
16	(France) Marc Garcia	DR Team Shark	ROC Yamaha	26	+1 Lap	
17	(France) Jean Foray	Jean Foray Racing Team	ROC Yamaha	26	+1 Lap	
18	(Luxembourg) Andreas Leuthe	Team Doppler Austria	ROC Yamaha	26	+1 Lap	
19	(Netherlands) Cees Doorakkers	Team Doorakkers	Harris Yamaha	26	+1 Lap	
20	(Switzerland) Bernard Haenggeli	Haenggeli Racing	ROC Yamaha	26	+1 Lap	
21	(Germany) Lothar Neukirchner	Sachsen Racing Team	Harris Yamaha	25	+2 Laps	
Ret	(Belgium) Laurent Naveau	Euro Team	ROC Yamaha	25	Retirement	
Ret	(Japan) Shinichi Itoh	Honda Team HRC	Honda	14	Accident	
Ret	(Australia) Daryl Beattie	Marlboro Team Roberts	Yamaha	11	Retirement	
Ret	(Italy) Lucio Pedercini	Team Pedercini	ROC Yamaha	10	Retirement	
Ret	(Italy) Luca Cadalora	Marlboro Team Roberts	Yamaha	9	Mechanical	
Ret	(Italy) Vittorio Scatola	Team Paton	Paton	6	Retirement	
Ret	(Italy) Marco Papa	Team Elit	ROC Yamaha	5	Retirement	
Ret	(France) Bernard Garcia	Yamaha Motor France	ROC Yamaha	2	Mechanical	
Ret	(United Kingdom) Kevin Mitchell	MBM Racing	Harris Yamaha	1	Retirement	
Ret	(France) Bruno Bonhuil	MTD Objectif 500	ROC Yamaha	1	Retirement	
Ret	(United Kingdom) Sean Emmett	Shell Harris Grand Prix	Harris Yamaha	0	Retirement	

== 250 cc classification ==
Pos	Rider	Manufacturer	Laps	Time/Retired	Points
1	(France) Jean Philippe Ruggia	Aprilia	26	44:29.850	25
2	(Italy) Doriano Romboni	Honda	26	+0.095	20
3	(Japan) Tadayuki Okada	Honda	26	+0.460	16
4	(Germany) Ralf Waldmann	Honda	26	+1.020	13
5	(Japan) Nobuatsu Aoki	Honda	26	+7.294	11
6	(Spain) Luis D'Antin	Honda	26	+30.037	10
7	(Japan) Tetsuya Harada	Yamaha	26	+30.220	9
8	(France) Jean-Michel Bayle	Aprilia	26	+30.662	8
9	(Netherlands) Wilco Zeelenberg	Honda	26	+31.156	7
10	(Switzerland) Eskil Suter	Aprilia	26	+34.876	6
11	(Spain) Carlos Checa	Honda	26	+46.037	5
12	(Netherlands) Jurgen vd Goorbergh	Aprilia	26	+48.334	4
13	(Germany) Bernd Kassner	Aprilia	26	+1:07.501	3
14	(Spain) Miguel Angel Castilla	Yamaha	26	+1:07.689	2
15	(Spain) José Luis Cardoso	Aprilia	26	+1:10.247	1
16	(Spain) Oscar Sainz	Aprilia	26	+1:18.060	
17	(Italy) Alessandro Gramigni	Aprilia	26	+1:26.767	
18	(Spain) Luis Maurel	Honda	26	+1:37.218	
19	(France) Frederic Protat	Honda	26	+1:37.377	
20	(Netherlands) Patrick vd Goorbergh	Aprilia	26	+1:37.534	
21	(Italy) Giuseppe Fiorillo	Honda	25	+1 Lap	
22	(United Kingdom) Jamie Robinson	Honda	25	+1 Lap	
23	(Spain) Enrique de Juan	Aprilia	25	+1 Lap	
24	(Finland) Krisse Kaas	Yamaha	25	+1 Lap	
Ret	(France) Christian Boudinot	Aprilia	24	Retirement	
Ret	(Italy) Loris Capirossi	Honda	22	Crankshaft	
Ret	(Austria) Andreas Preining	Aprilia	22	Retirement	
Ret	(Italy) Max Biaggi	Aprilia	21	Accident	
Ret	(Spain) Manuel Hernandez	Aprilia	13	Retirement	
Ret	(United States) Jim Filice	Yamaha	11	Accident	
Ret	(Switzerland) Adrien Bosshard	Honda	9	Accident	
Ret	(United Kingdom) Alan Patterson	Honda	5	Retirement	
Ret	(Germany) Adolf Stadler	Honda	2	Retirement	
Ret	(France) Noel Ferro	Honda	0	Retirement	

== 125 cc classification ==
Pos	Rider	Manufacturer	Laps	Time/Retired	Points
1	(Japan) Kazuto Sakata	Aprilia	23	43:05.188	25
2	(Germany) Peter Öttl	Aprilia	23	+6.802	20
3	(Spain) Herri Torrontegui	Aprilia	23	+10.048	16
4	(Japan) Noboru Ueda	Honda	23	+11.650	13
5	(Germany) Dirk Raudies	Honda	23	+12.183	11
6	(Japan) Takeshi Tsujimura	Honda	23	+26.358	10
7	(Germany) Oliver Koch	Honda	23	+26.981	9
8	(Netherlands) Loek Bodelier	Honda	23	+27.322	8
9	(Spain) Jorge Martinez	Yamaha	23	+27.887	7
10	(Japan) Masaki Tokudome	Honda	23	+29.463	6
11	(Australia) Garry McCoy	Aprilia	23	+35.899	5
12	(Italy) Stefano Perugini	Aprilia	23	+36.148	4
13	(Switzerland) Olivier Petrucciani	Aprilia	23	+1:01.533	3
14	(Japan) Haruchika Aoki	Honda	23	+1:06.475	2
15	(Italy) Bruno Casanova	Honda	23	+1:06.558	1
16	(France) Frederic Petit	Yamaha	23	+1:06.600	
17	(Netherlands) Hans Spaan	Honda	23	+1:07.212	
18	(Italy) Gabriele Debbia	Aprilia	23	+1:07.618	
19	(Spain) Antonio Sanchez	Honda	23	+1:23.916	
20	(Spain) Enrique Maturana	Yamaha	23	+1:27.378	
21	(Italy) Vittorio Lopez	Honda	23	+1:28.240	
22	(Austria) Manfred Baumann	Yamaha	23	+1:28.530	
23	(Japan) Masafumo Ono	Honda	23	+1:37.976	
24	(France) Nicolas Dussauge	Honda	23	+1:44.594	
Ret	(Japan) Akira Saito	Honda	15	Accident	
Ret	(Japan) Yoshiaki Katoh	Yamaha	15	Accident	
Ret	(Spain) Emilio Alzamora	Honda	10	Accident	
Ret	(United Kingdom) Neil Hodgson	Honda	6	Accident	
Ret	(Germany) Manfred Geissler	Aprilia	4	Accident	
Ret	(Italy) Daniela Tognoli	Aprilia	4	Retirement	
Ret	(Japan) Tomoko Igata	Honda	3	Retirement	
Ret	(Germany) Stefan Prein	Yamaha	2	Retirement	
Ret	(Italy) Fausto Gresini	Honda	0	Accident	
Ret	(Italy) Lucio Cecchinello	Honda	0	Accident	
Ret	(Japan) Hideyuki Nakajo	Honda	0	Accident	

Previous race: 1994 Japanese Grand Prix	FIM Grand Prix World Championship; 1994 season	Next race: 1994 Austrian Grand Prix
Previous race: 1993 Spanish Grand Prix	Spanish Grand Prix	Next race: 1995 Spanish Grand Prix
