= 1994 Grand Prix motorcycle racing season =

Sports season

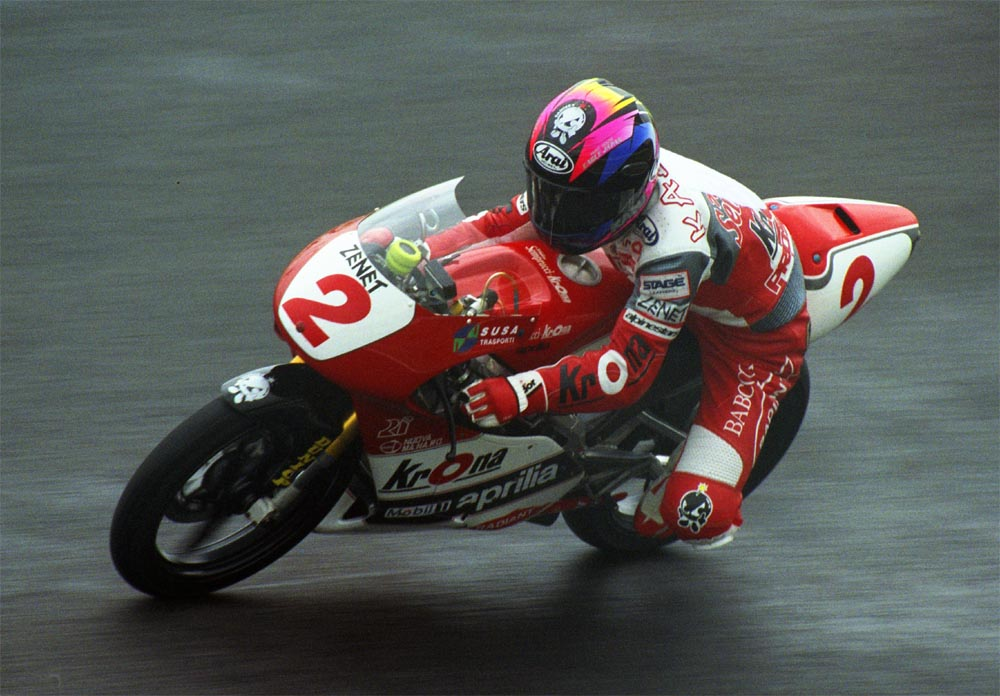
Kazuto Sakata (pictured at Suzuka) became the 1994 125cc world champion

The 1994 Grand Prix motorcycle racing season was the 46th F.I.M. Road Racing World Championship season.

== Season summary ==
1994 was the year in which Honda's Mick Doohan began to stamp his authority on the Grand Prix world. Honda's Longtime sponsor Rothmans left Honda to join Williams Renault in Formula One. Doohan won 9 races, the most since Giacomo Agostini won 11 in 1972. Kevin Schwantz was injured in a pre-season bicycle crash and raced in 6 races with his arm in plaster. Luca Cadalora took over from Wayne Rainey on the Yamaha and won two races. Aprilia began campaigning in the 500cc class with a 250 V twin motor enlarged to 380cc in hopes of using its lighter weight and nimble handling as an advantage.

Max Biaggi would win his first world title for Aprilia in a tight 250 class battle against Loris Capirossi and Tadayuki Okada. Kazuto Sakata won the 125 crown for Aprilia. He was the first Japanese rider to race for a European factory.

Honda secured the constructor's title in all three categories.

== 1994 Grand Prix season calendar ==
The following Grands Prix were scheduled to take place in 1994:

Round	Date	Grand Prix	Circuit
1	27 March	(Australia) Foster's Australian Motorcycle Grand Prix	Eastern Creek Raceway
2	10 April	(Malaysia) Malaysian Grand Prix	Shah Alam Circuit
3	24 April	Marlboro Grand Prix of Japan	Suzuka Circuit
4	8 May	(Spain) Gran Premio de España	Circuito Permanente de Jerez
5	22 May	Grand Prix Austria	Salzburgring
6	12 June	(Germany) Grand Prix Deutschland	Hockenheimring
7	25 June	(Netherlands) Lucky Strike Dutch Grand Prix	TT Circuit Assen
8	3 July	(Italy) Gran Premio d'Italia	Mugello Circuit
9	17 July	Grand Prix de France Moto	Bugatti Circuit
10	24 July	(United Kingdom) British Motorcycle Grand Prix	Donington Park
11	21 August	(Czech Republic) Grand Prix České republiky	Brno Circuit
12	11 September	United States Motorcycle Grand Prix	Laguna Seca Raceway
13	25 September	Gran Prix Marlboro Argentina	Autódromo Oscar Alfredo Gálvez
14	9 October	(Europe) Gran Premi Pepsi d'Europa	Circuit de Catalunya

=== Calendar changes ===
- The European Grand Prix was moved back from 4 July to 9 October.
- The French Grand Prix returned after a one-year absence on the Bugatti Circuit in Le Mans.
- The San Marino Grand Prix was removed and the Italian Grand Prix was held at the Mugello Circuit, while the Circuito Internazionale Santa Monica was taken off the calendar.
- The FIM Grand Prix, which hosted the Jarama circuit, was taken off the calendar.

== Participants ==
=== 500cc participants ===
Team	Constructor	Motorcycle	No	Rider	Rounds
(Japan) Lucky Strike Suzuki	Suzuki	Suzuki RGV500 (XR84)	1	(United States) Kevin Schwantz	1–12
(Japan) Lucky Strike Suzuki	Suzuki	Suzuki RGV500 (XR84)	6	(Brazil) Alex Barros	All
(Japan) Lucky Strike Suzuki	Suzuki	Suzuki RGV500 (XR84)	12	(Spain) Juan López Mella	14
(Japan) Lucky Strike Suzuki	Suzuki	Suzuki RGV500 (XR84)	19	(United Kingdom) Sean Emmett	13–14
(United States) Marlboro Team Roberts	Yamaha	Yamaha YZR500 (OWF9)	3	(Australia) Daryl Beattie	1–9, 12–14
(United States) Marlboro Team Roberts	Yamaha	Yamaha YZR500 (OWF9)	5	(Italy) Luca Cadalora	All
(United States) Marlboro Team Roberts	Yamaha	Yamaha YZR500 (OWF9)	56	(Japan) Norifumi Abe	10–11
(United States) Marlboro Team Roberts	Yamaha	Yamaha YZR500 (OWF9)	56	(Japan) Norifumi Abe	12
(Japan) Honda Team HRC	Honda	Honda NSR500 (NV0S)	4	(Australia) Mick Doohan	All
(Japan) Honda Team HRC	Honda	Honda NSR500 (NV0S)	7	(Japan) Shinichi Itoh	All
(Japan) Honda Team HRC	Honda	Honda NSR500 (NV0S)	8	(Spain) Àlex Crivillé	All
(Italy) Cagiva Team Agostini	Cagiva	Cagiva C594	10	(United States) Doug Chandler	All
(Italy) Cagiva Team Agostini	Cagiva	Cagiva C594	11	(United States) John Kocinski	All
(Italy) Cagiva Team Agostini	Cagiva	Cagiva C594	70	(United Kingdom) Carl Fogarty	10
(Spain) Lopez Mella Racing Team (rd 1-3); Team Repsol	ROC-Yamaha	ROC-Yamaha GP1	12	(Spain) Juan López Mella	1–9, 11–13
(Italy) Aprilia Racing Team	Aprilia	Aprilia RSW-2 500	13	(Italy) Loris Reggiani	4–8, 14
(United Kingdom) Team Millar	Yamaha	Yamaha YZR500	14	(United Kingdom) Jeremy McWilliams	All
(United Kingdom) Padgetts Motorcycles	Harris-Yamaha	Harris-Yamaha SLS500	15	(United Kingdom) John Reynolds	All
(Belgium) Euroteam	ROC-Yamaha	ROC-Yamaha GP1	16	(Belgium) Laurent Naveau	All
(Spain) Ducados Honda Pons	Honda	Honda NSR500	17	(Spain) Alberto Puig	All
Yamaha Motor France	ROC-Yamaha	ROC-Yamaha GP1	18	(France) Bernard Garcia	1–3
(France) Team ROC	ROC-Yamaha	ROC-Yamaha GP1	18	(France) Bernard Garcia	4, 6–14
(France) Team ROC	ROC-Yamaha	ROC-Yamaha GP1	28	(Spain) Julián Miralles	1–4
(France) Team ROC	ROC-Yamaha	ROC-Yamaha GP1	37	(France) Hervé Moineau	5
(France) Team ROC	ROC-Yamaha	ROC-Yamaha GP1	41	(New Zealand) Andrew Stroud	14
(France) Team ROC	ROC-Yamaha	ROC-Yamaha GP1	63	(Germany) Udo Mark	9–10
(France) Team ROC	ROC-Yamaha	ROC-Yamaha GP1	69	(France) Philippe Monneret	9
(France) Team ROC	ROC-Yamaha	ROC-Yamaha GP1	72	(Germany) Michael Liedl	11
(France) Team ROC	ROC-Yamaha	ROC-Yamaha GP1	79	(United States) Chuck Graves	12
(United Kingdom) Shell Harris Grand Prix	Harris-Yamaha	Harris-Yamaha SLS500	19	(United Kingdom) Sean Emmett	1–12
(United Kingdom) Shell Harris Grand Prix	Harris-Yamaha	Harris-Yamaha SLS500	40	(United Kingdom) Neil Hodgson	13–14
(United Kingdom) Shell Harris Grand Prix	Harris-Yamaha	Harris-Yamaha SLS500	52	(Australia) Scott Doohan	1
(United Kingdom) M.B.M. Racing	Harris-Yamaha	Harris-Yamaha SLS500	20	(United Kingdom) Kevin Mitchell	1–2, 4–14
(Netherlands) Team Doorakkers	Harris-Yamaha	Harris-Yamaha SLS500	21	(Netherlands) Cees Doorakkers	All
(Italy) Team Pedercini	ROC-Yamaha	ROC-Yamaha GP1	23	(Italy) Lucio Pedercini	All
(Italy) Team Pedercini	ROC-Yamaha	ROC-Yamaha GP1	24	(Italy) Cristiano Migliorati	All
(Italy) Team Elit	ROC-Yamaha	ROC-Yamaha GP1	25	(Italy) Marco Papa	1–2, 4–6, 11–14
(Italy) Team Elit	ROC-Yamaha	ROC-Yamaha GP1	38	(Italy) Ermanno Bastianini	8–9
(Italy) Team Elit	ROC-Yamaha	ROC-Yamaha GP1	39	(United Kingdom) James Haydon	10
(Switzerland) Haenggeli Racing	ROC-Yamaha	ROC-Yamaha GP1	27	(Switzerland) Bernard Haenggeli	All
(Spain) ROC Coronas Repsol	ROC-Yamaha	ROC-Yamaha GP1	28	(Spain) Julián Miralles	5–8
Team Doppler Austria	ROC-Yamaha	ROC-Yamaha GP1	29	(Luxembourg) Andreas Leuthe	All
(Italy) Team Paton	Paton	Paton V70 C9/2	30	(Italy) Vittorio Scatola	1–2, 4–8, 13–14
(Italy) Team Paton	Paton	Paton V70 C9/2	42	(Italy) Paul Pellissier	9, 11
(Germany) Sachsen Racing Team	Harris-Yamaha	Harris-Yamaha SLS500	31	(Germany) Lothar Neukirchner	1–7
(Germany) Sachsen Racing Team	Harris-Yamaha	Harris-Yamaha SLS500	32	(Germany) Evren Bischoff	9
(Germany) Sachsen Racing Team	Harris-Yamaha	Harris-Yamaha SLS500	63	(Germany) Udo Mark	6
(France) MTD Objectif 500	ROC-Yamaha	ROC-Yamaha GP1	34	(France) Bruno Bonhuil	All
(France) Jean Foray Racing Team	ROC-Yamaha	ROC-Yamaha GP1	36	(France) Jean Foray	All
(France) D.R. Team Shark	ROC-Yamaha	ROC-Yamaha GP1	44	(France) Marc Garcia	All
(United Kingdom) Slick 50 Team WCM	ROC-Yamaha	ROC-Yamaha GP1	50	(United Kingdom) Niall Mackenzie	All
(France) J.P.J. Racing	ROC-Yamaha	ROC-Yamaha GP1	51	(France) Jean-Pierre Jeandat	All
(Japan) Mister Donut Blue Fox	Honda	Honda NSR500	56	(Japan) Norifumi Abe	3
(Japan) YRTR	Yamaha	Yamaha YZR500	57	(Japan) Toshihiko Honma	3
(Germany) Manfred Erhardt	Harris-Yamaha	Harris-Yamaha SLS500	62	(Germany) Manfred Erhardt	6
(United Kingdom) Triton Team GB	Harris-Yamaha	Harris-Yamaha SLS500	73	(United Kingdom) Nick Hopkins	10
(United Kingdom) / (Chile) Shell Harris - Horta	Harris-Yamaha	Harris-Yamaha SLS500	77	(Chile) Felipe Horta	13
(United Kingdom) / (Argentina) YPF Padgetts - Yamasur	Harris-Yamaha	Harris-Yamaha SLS500	79	(Argentina) Nestor Amoroso	13

Key
Regular Rider
Wildcard Rider
Replacement Rider

== Results and standings ==
=== Grands Prix ===
Round	Date	Race	Location	125cc winner	250cc winner	500cc winner	Report
1	27 March	(Australia) Australian motorcycle Grand Prix	Eastern Creek	(Japan) Kazuto Sakata	(Italy) Max Biaggi	(United States) John Kocinski	Report
2	10 April	(Malaysia) Malaysian motorcycle Grand Prix	Shah Alam	(Japan) Noboru Ueda	(Italy) Max Biaggi	(Australia) Mick Doohan	Report
3	24 April	(Japan) Japanese motorcycle Grand Prix	Suzuka	(Japan) Takeshi Tsujimura	(Japan) Tadayuki Okada	(United States) Kevin Schwantz	Report
4	8 May	(Spain) Spanish motorcycle Grand Prix	Jerez	(Japan) Kazuto Sakata	(France) Jean-Philippe Ruggia	(Australia) Mick Doohan	Report
5	22 May	(Austria) Austrian motorcycle Grand Prix	Salzburgring	(Germany) Dirk Raudies	(Italy) Loris Capirossi	(Australia) Mick Doohan	Report
6	12 June	(Germany) German motorcycle Grand Prix	Hockenheim	(Germany) Dirk Raudies	(Italy) Loris Capirossi	(Australia) Mick Doohan	Report
7	25 June	(Netherlands) Dutch TT	Assen	(Japan) Takeshi Tsujimura	(Italy) Max Biaggi	(Australia) Mick Doohan	Report
8	3 July	(Italy) Italian motorcycle Grand Prix	Mugello	(Japan) Noboru Ueda	(Germany) Ralf Waldmann	(Australia) Mick Doohan	Report
9	17 July	(France) French motorcycle Grand Prix	Le Mans	(Japan) Noboru Ueda	(Italy) Loris Capirossi	(Australia) Mick Doohan	Report
10	24 July	(United Kingdom) British motorcycle Grand Prix	Donington	(Japan) Takeshi Tsujimura	(Italy) Loris Capirossi	(United States) Kevin Schwantz	Report
11	21 August	Czech Republic motorcycle Grand Prix	Brno	(Japan) Kazuto Sakata	(Italy) Max Biaggi	(Australia) Mick Doohan	Report
12	11 September	United States motorcycle Grand Prix	Laguna Seca	(Japan) Takeshi Tsujimura	(Italy) Doriano Romboni	(Italy) Luca Cadalora	Report
13	25 September	(Argentina) Argentine motorcycle Grand Prix	Buenos Aires	(Spain) Jorge Martínez	(Japan) Tadayuki Okada	(Australia) Mick Doohan	Report
14	9 October	(Europe) European motorcycle Grand Prix	Catalunya	(Germany) Dirk Raudies	(Italy) Max Biaggi	(Italy) Luca Cadalora	Report

=== 500cc riders' standings ===
Scoring system

Points are awarded to the top fifteen finishers. A rider has to finish the race to earn points.

Position	**1st**	**2nd**	**3rd**	**4th**	**5th**	**6th**	**7th**	**8th**	**9th**	**10th**	**11th**	**12th**	**13th**	**14th**	**15th**
Points	25	20	16	13	11	10	9	8	7	6	5	4	3	2	1

Pos	Rider	Bike	AUS (Australia)	MAL (Malaysia)	JPN (Japan)	ESP (Spain)	AUT (Austria)	GER (Germany)	NED (Netherlands)	ITA (Italy)	FRA (France)	GBR (United Kingdom)	CZE (Czech Republic)	USA (United States)	ARG (Argentina)	EUR (Europe)	Pts
1	(Australia) Mick Doohan	Honda NSR500	3	1	2	1	**1**	**1**	**1**	1	**1**	**2**	1	**3**	1	2	317
2	(Italy) Luca Cadalora	Yamaha YZR500	2	4	**4**	Ret	22	DNS	9	**2**	7	3	**3**	1	6	**1**	174
3	(United States) John Kocinski	Cagiva GP500	**1**	**2**	9	3	5	DNS	8	Ret	2	4	Ret	2	**3**	3	172
4	(United States) Kevin Schwantz	Suzuki RGV500	4	6	1	**2**	2	2	5	3	Ret	1	7				169
5	(Spain) Alberto Puig	Honda NSR500	7	5	8	6	6	3	4	4	4	7	5	7	5	7	152
6	(Spain) Àlex Crivillé	Honda NSR500	6	8	7	5	3	4	3	Ret	3	6	4	DNS	7	4	144
7	(Japan) Shinichi Ito	Honda NSR500	5	3	3	Ret	4	6	Ret	5	5	9	2	4	4	Ret	141
8	(Brazil) Alex Barros	Suzuki RGV500	8	7	5	4	7	5	2	7	6	Ret	8	8	8	6	134
9	(United States) Doug Chandler	Cagiva GP500	9	9	10	7	Ret	7	6	Ret	Ret	5	Ret	5	2	10	96
10	(United Kingdom) Niall Mackenzie	Yamaha YZR500	Ret	11	19	8	9	8	Ret	9	Ret	8	9	10	11	8	69
11	(France) Bernard Garcia	ROC-Yamaha	11	Ret	11	Ret		9	10	8	Ret	11	11	12	12	9	56
12	(United Kingdom) Jeremy McWilliams	Yamaha YZR500	17	14	13	11	16	Ret	Ret	15	8	10	10	9	9	12	49
13	(Australia) Daryl Beattie	Yamaha YZR500	Ret	10	28	Ret	8	Ret	7	6	DNS			Ret	Ret	5	44
14	(United Kingdom) John Reynolds	Yamaha YZR500	10	12	12	10	10	10	Ret	Ret	Ret	14	12	Ret	Ret	11	43
15	(United Kingdom) Sean Emmett	Harris-Yamaha	14	13	17	Ret	12	11	Ret	14	Ret	12	13	11	10	Ret	34
16	(Spain) Juan López Mella	ROC-Yamaha	13	Ret	15	13	Ret	12	Ret	10	10		Ret	DNS	DNS		26
16	(Spain) Juan López Mella	Suzuki RGV500														13	26
17	(Japan) Norifumi Abe	Honda NSR500			Ret												20
17	(Japan) Norifumi Abe	Yamaha YZR500										DNS	6	6			20
18	(Belgium) Laurent Naveau	ROC-Yamaha	16	Ret	14	Ret	15	14	12	16	Ret	13	Ret	13	14	14	19
19	(France) Jean-Pierre Jeandat	ROC-Yamaha	18	16	21	14	13	Ret	11	11	Ret	DNS	16	14	Ret	17	17
20	(Italy) Cristiano Migliorati	ROC-Yamaha	15	20	20	12	14	Ret	Ret	12	15	Ret	18	17	16	18	12
21	(France) Marc Garcia	ROC-Yamaha	20	18	22	16	17	Ret	Ret	Ret	9	Ret	15	16	13	Ret	11
22	(Japan) Toshihiko Honma	Yamaha YZR500			6												10
23	(France) Jean Foray	ROC-Yamaha	Ret	Ret	23	17	20	Ret	15	19	11	19	14	21	Ret	DNS	8
24	(Italy) Loris Reggiani	Aprilia RSW500				9	Ret	Ret	Ret	Ret						Ret	7
25	(Switzerland) Bernard Haenggeli	ROC-Yamaha	19	Ret	25	20	Ret	Ret	16	13	12	Ret	17	18	19	20	7
26	(Spain) Julián Miralles	ROC-Yamaha	21	Ret	24	15	18	13	13	Ret							7
27	(France) Bruno Bonhuil	ROC-Yamaha	22	17	16	Ret	19	15	14	17	13	15	Ret	19	Ret	Ret	7
28	(France) Hervé Moineau	ROC-Yamaha					11										5
29	(Australia) Scott Doohan	Harris-Yamaha	12														4
30	(Germany) Udo Mark	Harris-Yamaha						Ret									2
30	(Germany) Udo Mark	ROC-Yamaha									14	17					2
31	(Italy) Lucio Pedercini	ROC-Yamaha	Ret	15	18	Ret	Ret	Ret	Ret	20	Ret	18	Ret	15	17	Ret	2
32	(United Kingdom) Neil Hodgson	Harris-Yamaha													15	16	1
33	(New Zealand) Andrew Stroud	ROC-Yamaha														15	1
	(United Kingdom) Kevin Mitchell	Harris-Yamaha	Ret	Ret		Ret	21	16	17	Ret	16	16	Ret	Ret	Ret	Ret	0
	(Luxembourg) Andreas Leuthe	ROC-Yamaha	23	21	26	18	Ret	17	Ret	Ret	17	20	Ret	Ret		Ret	0
	(Netherlands) Cees Doorakkers	Harris-Yamaha	25	19	Ret	19	Ret	18	18	21	Ret	21	20	20	18	19	0
	(Italy) Ermanno Bastianini	ROC-Yamaha								18	Ret						0
	(France) Philippe Monneret	ROC-Yamaha									18						0
	(Germany) Lothar Neukirchner	Harris-Yamaha	DNQ	Ret	27	21	DNQ	19	Ret								0
	(Italy) Vittorio Scatola	Paton	24	DNS		Ret	DNQ	DNQ	19	Ret					Ret	Ret	0
	(Italy) Marco Papa	ROC-Yamaha	Ret	Ret		Ret	Ret	Ret					19	Ret	Ret	Ret	0
	(Argentina) Néstor Amoroso	Harris-Yamaha													20		0
	(United Kingdom) Nick Hopkins	Harris-Yamaha										Ret					0
	(United Kingdom) James Haydon	ROC-Yamaha										Ret					0
	(Germany) Michael Liedl	Harris-Yamaha											Ret				0
	(Chile) Felipe Horta	Harris-Yamaha													Ret		0
	(Italy) Paul Pellisier	Paton									DNQ		DNQ				0
Pos	Rider	Bike	AUS (Australia)	MAL (Malaysia)	JPN (Japan)	ESP (Spain)	AUT (Austria)	GER (Germany)	NED (Netherlands)	ITA (Italy)	FRA (France)	GBR (United Kingdom)	CZE (Czech Republic)	USA (United States)	ARG (Argentina)	EUR (Europe)	Pts

Colour	Result
Gold	Winner
Silver	Second place
Bronze	Third place
Green	Points classification
Blue	Non-points classification
Blue	Non-classified finish (NC)
Purple	Retired, not classified (Ret)
Red	Did not qualify (DNQ)
Red	Did not pre-qualify (DNPQ)
Black	Disqualified (DSQ)
White	Did not start (DNS)
White	Withdrew (WD)
White	Race cancelled (C)
Blank	Did not practice (DNP)
Blank	Did not arrive (DNA)
Blank	Excluded (EX)

**Bold** – Pole
Italics – Fastest Lap

=== 250cc riders' standings ===
Scoring system

Points are awarded to the top fifteen finishers. A rider has to finish the race to earn points.

Position	**1st**	**2nd**	**3rd**	**4th**	**5th**	**6th**	**7th**	**8th**	**9th**	**10th**	**11th**	**12th**	**13th**	**14th**	**15th**
Points	25	20	16	13	11	10	9	8	7	6	5	4	3	2	1

Pos	Rider	Bike	AUS (Australia)	MAL (Malaysia)	JPN (Japan)	ESP (Spain)	AUT (Austria)	GER (Germany)	NED (Netherlands)	ITA (Italy)	FRA (France)	GBR (United Kingdom)	CZE (Czech Republic)	USA (United States)	ARG (Argentina)	EUR (Europe)	Pts
1	(Italy) Max Biaggi	Aprilia	1	**1**	**4**	Ret	**2**	2	**1**	**Ret**	3	Ret	**1**	2	2	**1**	234
2	(Japan) Tadayuki Okada	Honda	5	2	1	3	4	5	2	7	9	2	5	4	1	4	214
3	(Italy) Loris Capirossi	Honda	**3**	3	2	**Ret**	1	**1**	Ret	3	1	**1**	Ret	Ret	**5**	2	199
4	(Italy) Doriano Romboni	Honda	2	5	6	2	3	3	Ret	Ret	**2**	3	Ret	**1**	DNS	3	170
5	(Germany) Ralf Waldmann	Honda	7	6	Ret	4	5	6	4	1	4	7	2	10	8	7	156
6	(France) Jean-Philippe Ruggia	Aprilia	4	4	7	1	6	8	Ret	4	7	6	3	Ret	4	6	149
7	(Japan) Tetsuya Harada	Yamaha	DNS		9	7	Ret	7	Ret	2	8	4	Ret	3	3	5	109
8	(France) Jean-Michel Bayle	Aprilia	10	7	11	8	11	11	6	8	5	5	6	Ret	7	8	105
9	(Spain) Luis D'Antin	Honda	8	8	10	6	7	9	7	6	Ret	9	7	6	9	DNS	100
10	(Japan) Nobuatsu Aoki	Honda	6	Ret	8	5	Ret	4	5	Inj	6	8	4	5	21	Ret	95
11	(Netherlands) Wilco Zeelenberg	Honda	9	9	Ret	9	Ret	10	3	9	10	11	9	9	11	12	84
12	(Spain) Carlos Checa	Honda	14	11	Ret	11	Ret	14	11	10	13	12	Ret	7	10	9	54
13	(Switzerland) Eskil Suter	Aprilia	15	Ret	15	10	10	Ret	8	Ret	14	10	8	12	19	Ret	42
14	(Switzerland) Adrian Bosshard	Honda	13	12	Ret	Ret		DNS	Ret	11	12	14	13	13	12	10	34
15	(Austria) Andy Preining	Aprilia	12	13	21	Ret	12	13	Ret	12	21	Ret	10	11	Ret	15	30
16	(Netherlands) Patrick van den Goorbergh	Aprilia	Ret	Ret	13	20	8	12	10	14	16	17	12	16	Ret	22	27
17	(Netherlands) Jurgen van den Goorbergh	Aprilia	16	Ret	12	12	9	Ret	9	16	Ret	16	Ret	14	Ret	17	24
18	(United States) Kenny Roberts Jr.	Yamaha											Ret	8	6	11	23
19	(Japan) Tohru Ukawa	Honda			3												16
20	(Italy) Marcellino Lucchi	Aprilia								5							11
20	(Japan) Takuma Aoki	Honda			5												11
22	(Japan) Toshihiko Honma	Yamaha						Ret	13	Ret	11	13					11
23	(Italy) Alessandro Gramigni	Aprilia	17	10	Ret	17	15	17	DNS	13	Ret	Ret	Ret	Ret	Ret	Ret	10
24	(Spain) Luis Carlos Maurel	Honda	21	16	16	19	DNS	16	16	19	15	15	11	17	16	13	10
25	(Germany) Bernd Kassner	Aprilia	Ret	14	19	14	14	Ret	14	15	20	DNS					9
26	(Italy) Giuseppe Fiorillo	Honda		20	18	21	16	19	12	Ret	Ret	Ret	14	Ret	14	16	8
27	(Germany) Adi Stadler	Honda	Ret	15	14	Ret	13	15	15	18	17	18	Ret	Ret	18	19	8
28	(Australia) Craig Connell	Honda	11														5
29	(Spain) Miguel Castilla	Yamaha				13										14	5
30	(Spain) Juan Borja	Honda	22	Ret	Ret						18	Ret	15	15	13	18	5
31	(Spain) José Luis Cardoso	Aprilia	19	Ret	Ret	15	Ret	21	Ret	Ret	Ret	19	Ret	20	15	Ret	2
	(Spain) Oscar Sainz	Yamaha				16											0
	(France) Frédéric Protat	Honda	18	18	17	18	17	Ret	Ret	20	Ret	Ret	20	Ret	17	Ret	0
	(France) Christian Boudinot	Aprilia	20	Ret	Ret	Ret	19	Ret	17	22	19	21	17	Ret	Ret	Ret	0
	(France) Noël Ferro	Honda	Ret	19	20	Ret	Ret	20	18	17	22	Ret	19	18	Ret	Ret	0
	(Germany) Jürgen Fuchs	Honda						18					18	Ret	20	20	0
	(Austria) Alexander Witting	Aprilia					18										0
	(Finland) Krisse Kaas	Yamaha	25	23	23	24	24	22	19	21	24	Ret	21	Ret	23	25	0
	(United Kingdom) Alan Patterson	Honda	24	22	Ret	Ret	20	Ret	Ret	Ret							0
	(Spain) Manuel Hernández	Aprilia				Ret	Ret	23	20	Ret	Ret	DNS		Ret	25	Ret	0
	(Spain) Enrique de Juan	Aprilia	Ret	Ret	22	23	21	DNS	Ret	Ret	Ret	23	22	22	Ret	23	0
	(Canada) Rodney Fee	Honda	Ret	24	Ret		23	Ret	22	23	Ret	22	23	21	Ret	Ret	0
	(Malaysia) Meng Heng Kuang	Yamaha		21													0
	(Austria) Hans Maxwald	Yamaha					22										0
	(Australia) René Bongers	Honda	23														0
	(United States) Jim Filice	Yamaha			Ret	Ret	Ret										0
	(Germany) Peter Koller	Honda						Ret									0
Pos	Rider	Bike	AUS (Australia)	MAL (Malaysia)	JPN (Japan)	ESP (Spain)	AUT (Austria)	GER (Germany)	NED (Netherlands)	ITA (Italy)	FRA (France)	GBR (United Kingdom)	CZE (Czech Republic)	USA (United States)	ARG (Argentina)	EUR (Europe)	Pts

Colour	Result
Gold	Winner
Silver	Second place
Bronze	Third place
Green	Points classification
Blue	Non-points classification
Blue	Non-classified finish (NC)
Purple	Retired, not classified (Ret)
Red	Did not qualify (DNQ)
Red	Did not pre-qualify (DNPQ)
Black	Disqualified (DSQ)
White	Did not start (DNS)
White	Withdrew (WD)
White	Race cancelled (C)
Blank	Did not practice (DNP)
Blank	Did not arrive (DNA)
Blank	Excluded (EX)

**Bold** – Pole
Italics – Fastest Lap

=== 125cc riders' standings ===
Scoring system

Points are awarded to the top fifteen finishers. A rider has to finish the race to earn points.

Position	**1st**	**2nd**	**3rd**	**4th**	**5th**	**6th**	**7th**	**8th**	**9th**	**10th**	**11th**	**12th**	**13th**	**14th**	**15th**
Points	25	20	16	13	11	10	9	8	7	6	5	4	3	2	1

Pos	Rider	Bike	AUS (Australia)	MAL (Malaysia)	JPN (Japan)	ESP (Spain)	AUT (Austria)	GER (Germany)	NED (Netherlands)	ITA (Italy)	FRA (France)	GBR (United Kingdom)	CZE (Czech Republic)	USA (United States)	ARG (Argentina)	EUR (Europe)	Pts
1	(Japan) Kazuto Sakata	Aprilia	**1**	**2**	2	**1**	5	2	4	2	**3**	**4**	**1**	**Ret**	9	7	224
2	(Japan) Noboru Ueda	Honda	7	1	**Ret**	4	**2**	**6**	**Ret**	1	1	6	2	9	**2**	6	194
3	(Japan) Takeshi Tsujimura	Honda	Ret	5	1	6	Ret	Ret	1	3	2	1	5	1	7	4	190
4	(Germany) Dirk Raudies	Honda	10	4	Ret	5	1	1	Ret	5	5	8	7	8	6	**1**	162
5	(Germany) Peter Öttl	Aprilia	2	Ret	4	2	4	4	Ret	4	4	3	Ret	3	13	2	160
6	(Spain) Jorge Martínez	Yamaha	Ret	3	7	9	17	7	2	7	6	10	4	5	1	Ret	135
7	(Italy) Stefano Perugini	Aprilia	Ret	Ret	19	12	6	5	Ret	Ret	7	2	3	2	3	Ret	106
8	(Japan) Masaki Tokudome	Honda	9	14	6	10	Ret	9	5	6	9	12	6	14	8	13	87
9	(Switzerland) Olivier Petrucciani	Aprilia	5	7	Ret	13	15	10	7	11	18	7	9	13	16	5	74
10	(Spain) Herri Torrontegui	Aprilia	8	9	8	3	14	Ret	6	13	8	5	Ret			Ret	73
11	(Japan) Hideyuki Nakajoh	Honda	15	11	3	Ret	11	Ret	9	NC	11	11	8	6	Ret	8	70
12	(Japan) Haruchika Aoki	Honda	17	10	17	14	25	DNQ	12	9	12	13	19	4	12	3	59
13	(Australia) Garry McCoy	Aprilia	3	12	9	11	3	DNS	8	Ret	17	Ret	16				56
14	(Japan) Akira Saito	Honda	6	8	5	Ret	7	8	Ret	14	14	15	Ret	19	14	Ret	53
15	(Netherlands) Loek Bodelier	Honda	11	Ret	11	8	18	15	3	12	Ret	Ret	14	Ret	Ret	9	48
16	(Italy) Fausto Gresini	Honda	4	6	18	Ret	8	13	16	17	10	20		DNS	Ret	10	46
17	(Italy) Gianluigi Scalvini	Aprilia	12						13	Ret	Ret	Ret	15	10	4	11	32
18	(Germany) Oliver Koch	Honda	23	13	13	7	10	11	DNS				Ret	12	Ret	Ret	30
19	(Spain) Carlos Giró Jr.	Aprilia	26	DNS	20		28	20	Ret	15	Ret	9	13	7	10	Ret	26
20	(Japan) Tomomi Manako	Honda						3	Ret	8							24
21	(Germany) Stefan Prein	Yamaha	19	Ret	15	Ret	16	21	Ret	16	15	17	11	11	11	21	17
22	(Spain) Emilio Alzamora	Honda		Ret	16	Ret	22	22	11	18	Ret	22	Ret	21	5	Ret	16
23	(Italy) Bruno Casanova	Honda	16	15	10	15	13	12	DNS								15
24	(Italy) Gabriele Debbia	Aprilia	13	Ret	21	18	20	Ret	10	19	19	14		20	Ret	Ret	11
25	(Germany) Manfred Geissler	Aprilia	20	16	14	Ret	21	Ret	Ret	20	16	16	10	15	Ret	20	9
26	(Japan) Yoshiaki Katoh	Yamaha	Ret	Ret		Ret	12	Ret	Ret	DNS						12	8
27	(Italy) Emilio Cuppini	Aprilia					9	Ret									7
28	(Japan) Tomoko Igata	Honda	14	Ret	Ret	Ret	Ret				NC	19	12	23	Ret	15	7
29	(Italy) Roberto Locatelli	Aprilia								**10**							6
30	(Italy) Lucio Cecchinello	Honda	18	21	Ret	Ret	19	14	15	Ret	Ret	23	17	17	Ret	14	5
31	(Japan) Kunihiro Amano	Honda			12												4
32	(Spain) Juan Enrique Maturana	Yamaha				20					13	18	22	16	15		4
33	(France) Frédéric Petit	Yamaha	22	Ret	23	16	24	17	14	Ret	Ret	24	21	Ret	Ret	22	2
	(United Kingdom) Neil Hodgson	Honda	Ret	17	Ret	Ret	27	16	18	Ret	20	21	Ret	22			0
	(Italy) Vittorio Lopez	Honda	28	18	Ret	21	26	19	19	23	Ret	27	20	18	Ret	16	0
	(Austria) Manfred Baumann	Yamaha	Ret	22	22	22	30	18	17	Ret	Ret	Ret	23	26	18	Ret	0
	(Netherlands) Hans Spaan	Honda	24	23	Ret	17	23	Ret	20	22	23	Ret	Ret	Ret	Ret	23	0
	(Italy) Luigi Ancona	Honda								21	25	Ret	18				0
	(United Kingdom) Darren Barton	Honda										28			Ret	18	0
	(Spain) Antonio Sanchez	Honda				19										19	0
	(Japan) Masafumi Ono	Honda	27	19	24	23	DNQ										0
	(Malaysia) Chee Kieong Soong	Yamaha		20													0
	(Italy) Giuseppe Fiorillo	Honda	21														0
	(France) Gregory Fouet	Yamaha									21						0
	(France) Bertrand Stey	Honda								25	22	26					0
	(Japan) Yasuaki Takahashi	Honda								24	26	25	DNS	24	Ret	25	0
	(France) Nicolas Dussauge	Honda				24	29	Ret	DNS				25	28	Ret	Ret	0
	(Germany) Frank Baldinger	Honda								Ret	24	DNS					0
	(Australia) Glen Richards	Aprilia	25														0
	(France) Fabien Rousseau	Aprilia									27						0
	(Austria) Gerwin Hofer	Honda					31										0
	(Austria) Georg Scharl	Honda					32										0
	(Italy) Daniela Tognoli	Aprilia	Ret	Ret	Ret	Ret											0
	(Australia) Ken Fisher	Honda	Ret														0
	(Japan) Hiroyuki Kikuchi	Honda			Ret												0
	(Italy) Ivan Cremonini	Aprilia								Ret							0
	(United Kingdom) Kevin Mawdsley	Honda										Ret					0
Pos	Rider	Bike	AUS (Australia)	MAL (Malaysia)	JPN (Japan)	ESP (Spain)	AUT (Austria)	GER (Germany)	NED (Netherlands)	ITA (Italy)	FRA (France)	GBR (United Kingdom)	CZE (Czech Republic)	USA (United States)	ARG (Argentina)	EUR (Europe)	Pts

Colour	Result
Gold	Winner
Silver	Second place
Bronze	Third place
Green	Points classification
Blue	Non-points classification
Blue	Non-classified finish (NC)
Purple	Retired, not classified (Ret)
Red	Did not qualify (DNQ)
Red	Did not pre-qualify (DNPQ)
Black	Disqualified (DSQ)
White	Did not start (DNS)
White	Withdrew (WD)
White	Race cancelled (C)
Blank	Did not practice (DNP)
Blank	Did not arrive (DNA)
Blank	Excluded (EX)

**Bold** – Pole
Italics – Fastest Lap
