= 1994 United States motorcycle Grand Prix =

1994 United States Grand Prix
Race details
- Race 12 of 14 races in the 1994 Grand Prix motorcycle racing season
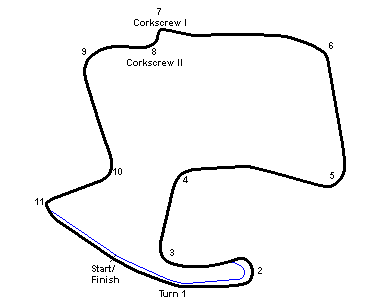
- Date: September 11 1994
- Official name: United States Motorcycle Grand Prix
- Location: Laguna Seca Raceway
- Course: Permanent racing facility; 3.602 km (2.238 mi)

MotoGP
Pole position
- Rider: (Australia) Mick Doohan
- Time: 1:26.068
Fastest lap
- Rider: (United States) John Kocinski
- Time: 1:26.444
Podium
- First: (Italy) Luca Cadalora
- Second: (United States) John Kocinski
- Third: (Australia) Mick Doohan

250cc
Pole position
- Rider: (Italy) Doriano Romboni
- Time: 1:27.499
Fastest lap
- Rider: (Italy) Max Biaggi
- Time: 1:28.046
Podium
- First: (Italy) Doriano Romboni
- Second: (Italy) Max Biaggi
- Third: (Japan) Tetsuya Harada

125cc
Pole position
- Rider: (Japan) Kazuto Sakata
- Time: 1:33.170
Fastest lap
- Rider: (Italy) Stefano Perugini
- Time: 1:35.432
Podium
- First: (Japan) Takeshi Tsujimura
- Second: (Italy) Stefano Perugini
- Third: (Germany) Peter Öttl

The 1994 United States motorcycle Grand Prix was the twelfth round of the 1994 Grand Prix motorcycle racing season. It took place on September 11, 1994, at the Laguna Seca Raceway. This round was the last motorcycle Grand Prix hosted by the United States until 2005.

== 500 cc classification ==
Pos.	Rider	Team	Manufacturer	Time/Retired	Points
1	(Italy) Luca Cadalora	Marlboro Team Roberts	Yamaha	48:00.370	25
2	(United States) John Kocinski	Cagiva Team Agostini	Cagiva	+7.896	20
3	(Australia) Mick Doohan	Honda Team HRC	Honda	+24.876	16
4	(Japan) Shinichi Itoh	Honda Team HRC	Honda	+36.125	13
5	(United States) Doug Chandler	Cagiva Team Agostini	Cagiva	+36.130	11
6	(Japan) Norifumi Abe	Mister Yumcha Blue Fox	Yamaha	+44.454	10
7	(Spain) Alberto Puig	Ducados Honda Pons	Honda	+59.116	9
8	(Brazil) Alex Barros	Lucky Strike Suzuki	Suzuki	+1:11.026	8
9	(United Kingdom) Jeremy McWilliams	Millar Racing	Yamaha	+1:15.888	7
10	(United Kingdom) Niall Mackenzie	Slick 50 Team WCM	ROC Yamaha	+1:22.916	6
11	(United Kingdom) Sean Emmett	Shell Harris Grand Prix	Harris Yamaha	+1:27.047	5
12	(France) Bernard Garcia	Yamaha Motor France	ROC Yamaha	+1 Lap	4
13	(Belgium) Laurent Naveau	Euro Team	ROC Yamaha	+1 Lap	3
14	(France) Jean Pierre Jeandat	JPJ Racing	ROC Yamaha	+1 Lap	2
15	(Italy) Lucio Pedercini	Team Pedercini	ROC Yamaha	+1 Lap	1
16	(France) Marc Garcia	DR Team Shark	ROC Yamaha	+1 Lap	
17	(Italy) Cristiano Migliorati	Team Pedercini	ROC Yamaha	+1 Lap	
18	(Switzerland) Bernard Haenggeli	Haenggeli Racing	ROC Yamaha	+1 Lap	
19	(France) Bruno Bonhuil	MTD Objectif 500	ROC Yamaha	+1 Lap	
20	(Netherlands) Cees Doorakkers	Team Doorakkers	Harris Yamaha	+1 Lap	
21	(France) Jean Foray	Jean Foray Racing Team	ROC Yamaha	+1 Lap	
Ret	(United Kingdom) Kevin Mitchell	MBM Racing	Harris Yamaha	Retirement	
Ret	(United Kingdom) John Reynolds	Padgett's Motorcycles	Harris Yamaha	Retirement	
Ret	(Italy) Marco Papa	Team Elit	ROC Yamaha	Retirement	
Ret	(Australia) Daryl Beattie	Marlboro Team Roberts	Yamaha	Retirement	
DNS	(United States) Kevin Schwantz	Lucky Strike Suzuki	Suzuki	Did not start	
DNS	(Spain) Juan Lopez Mella	Lopez Mella Racing Team	ROC Yamaha	Did not start	
DNS	(United States) Chuck Graves	Team ROC	ROC Yamaha	Did not start	
DNS	(Spain) Àlex Crivillé	Honda Team HRC	Honda	Did not start	
DNQ	(Luxembourg) Andreas Leuthe	Team Doppler Austria	ROC Yamaha	Did not qualify	

== 250 cc classification ==
Pos	Rider	Manufacturer	Time/Retired	Grid	Points
1	(Italy) Doriano Romboni	Honda	46:01.397	1	25
2	(Italy) Max Biaggi	Aprilia	+1.433	2	20
3	(Japan) Tetsuya Harada	Yamaha	+1.631	7	16
4	(Japan) Tadayuki Okada	Honda	+2.575	4	13
5	(Japan) Nobuatsu Aoki	Honda	+2.749	6	11
6	(Spain) Luis D'Antin	Honda	+24.541	9	10
7	(Spain) Carlos Checa	Honda	+24.697	11	9
8	(United States) Kenny Roberts Jr	Yamaha	+37.433	13	8
9	(Netherlands) Wilco Zeelenberg	Honda	+37.849	18	7
10	(Germany) Ralf Waldmann	Honda	+40.927	8	6
11	(Austria) Andreas Preining	Aprilia	+44.915	14	5
12	(Switzerland) Eskil Suter	Aprilia	+45.154	16	4
13	(Switzerland) Adrien Bosshard	Honda	+46.499	15	3
14	(Netherlands) Jurgen vd Goorbergh	Aprilia	+47.179	12	2
15	(Spain) Juan Borja	Honda	+1:11.885	19	1
16	(Netherlands) Patrick vd Goorbergh	Aprilia	+1:24.733	23	
17	(Spain) Luis Maurel	Honda	+1:28.002	20	
18	(France) Noel Ferro	Honda	+1:28.843	24	
19	(United States) Chris D' Aluisio	Aprilia	+1 Lap	26	
20	(Spain) José Luis Cardoso	Aprilia	+1 Lap	27	
21	(Canada) Rodney Fee	Honda	+1 Lap	34	
22	(Spain) Enrique de Juan	Aprilia	+1 Lap	33	
Ret	(United States) Richard Oliver	Yamaha	Retirement	17	
Ret	(France) Jean-Michel Bayle	Aprilia	Retirement	10	
Ret	(France) Chrisrian Boudinot	Aprilia	Retirement	31	
Ret	(Spain) Manuel Hernandez	Aprilia	Retirement	35	
Ret	(Germany) Adolf Stadler	Honda	Retirement	22	
Ret	(France) Jean Philippe Ruggia	Aprilia	Retirement	5	
Ret	(France) Frederic Protat	Honda	Retirement	28	
Ret	(United Kingdom) James Haydon	Honda	Retirement	25	
Ret	(Italy) Giuseppe Fiorillo	Honda	Retirement	29	
Ret	(Germany) Jürgen Fuchs	Honda	Retirement	21	
Ret	(Finland) Krisse Kaas	Yamaha	Retirement	30	
Ret	(Italy) Alessandro Gramigni	Aprilia	Retirement	32	
Ret	(Italy) Loris Capirossi	Honda	Retirement	3	

== 125 cc classification ==
Pos	Rider	Manufacturer	Time/Retired	Grid	Points
1	(Japan) Takeshi Tsujimura	Honda	45:21.102	9	25
2	(Italy) Stefano Perugini	Aprilia	+0.974	10	20
3	(Germany) Peter Öttl	Aprilia	+1.552	5	16
4	(Japan) Haruchika Aoki	Honda	+14.715	2	13
5	(Spain) Jorge Martinez	Yamaha	+17.852	3	11
6	(Japan) Hideyuki Nakajo	Honda	+18.070	18	10
7	(Spain) Carlos Giro	Aprilia	+18.774	8	9
8	(Germany) Dirk Raudies	Honda	+23.416	6	8
9	(Japan) Noboru Ueda	Honda	+33.070	4	7
10	(Italy) Gianluigi Scalvini	Aprilia	+44.446	20	6
11	(Germany) Stefan Prein	Yamaha	+48.588	16	5
12	(Germany) Oliver Koch	Honda	+53.095	13	4
13	(Switzerland) Olivier Petrucciani	Aprilia	+56.158	14	3
14	(Japan) Masaki Tokudome	Honda	+56.191	7	2
15	(Germany) Manfred Geissler	Aprilia	+56.402	23	1
16	(Spain) Enrique Maturana	Yamaha	+1:03.388	26	
17	(Italy) Lucio Cecchinello	Honda	+1:16.078	17	
18	(Italy) Vittorio Lopez	Honda	+1:16.265	30	
19	(Japan) Akira Saito	Honda	+1:16.554	12	
20	(Italy) Gabriele Debbia	Honda	+1:16.942	11	
21	(Spain) Emilio Alzamora	Honda	+1:20.930	22	
22	(United Kingdom) Neil Hodgson	Honda	+1:29.492	21	
23	(Japan) Tomoko Igata	Honda	+1:33.868	25	
24	(Japan) Katsuyoshi Takahashi	Honda	+1:33.961	35	
25	(Italy) Max Gambino	Aprilia	+1 Lap	28	
26	(Austria) Manfred Baumann	Yamaha	+1 Lap	32	
27	(United States) Takahito Mori	Honda	+1 Lap	31	
28	(France) Nicolas Dussauge	Honda	+1 Lap	33	
29	(United States) Kevin Murray	Honda	+1 Lap	36	
Ret	(Germany) Maik Stief	Aprilia	Retirement	15	
Ret	(Netherlands) Loek Bodelier	Honda	Retirement	19	
Ret	(France) Frederic Petit	Yamaha	Retirement	29	
Ret	(Netherlands) Hans Spaan	Honda	Retirement	34	
Ret	(Japan) Kazuto Sakata	Aprilia	Retirement	1	
Ret	(Italy) Fausto Gresini	Honda	Retirement	24	

Previous race: 1994 Czech Republic Grand Prix	FIM Grand Prix World Championship; 1994 season	Next race: 1994 Argentine Grand Prix
Previous race: 1993 United States Grand Prix	United States Grand Prix	Next race: 2005 United States Grand Prix
