= Takeshi Tsujimura =

Japanese motorcycle racer

- Nationality: Japanese
Motorcycle racing career statistics
Grand Prix motorcycle racing
Active years	1993 - 1998
First race	1993 125cc Australian Grand Prix
Last race	1998 250cc Argentine Grand Prix
First win	1993 125cc Austrian Grand Prix
Last win	1994 125cc United States Grand Prix
Team(s)	Yamaha, Honda
Starts / Wins / Podiums / Poles / F. laps / Points; 82 / 5 / 13 / 1 / 2 / 635

Takeshi Tsujimura (辻村猛; born July 4, 1974 in Osaka) is a former Grand Prix motorcycle road racer from Japan. Tsujimura began his Grand Prix career in 1993 with Yamaha. He enjoyed his best season in 1994 when he won four races and finished the season in third place behind Kazuto Sakata and Noboru Ueda in the 125cc world championship. In 2006, he teamed with Shinichi Itoh to win the Suzuka 8 Hours endurance race.

== Career statistics ==
=== Suzuka 8 Hours results ===
Year	Team	Co-Rider	Bike	Pos
2006	(Japan) F.C.C.-TSR ZIP-FM Racing	(Japan) Shinichi Ito (Japan) Takeshi Tsujimura	Honda CBR1000RR	1st
