= 1992 British motorcycle Grand Prix =

(United Kingdom) 1992 British Grand Prix
Race details
- Race 11 of 13 races in the 1992 Grand Prix motorcycle racing season
- Date: 2 August 1992
- Official name: Rothmans British Grand Prix
- Location: Donington Park
- Course: Permanent racing facility; 4.023 km (2.500 mi)

500cc
Pole position
- Rider: (United States) Eddie Lawson
- Time: 1:33.814
Fastest lap
- Rider: (United States) Wayne Rainey
- Time: 1:34.194
Podium
- First: (Australia) Wayne Gardner
- Second: (United States) Wayne Rainey
- Third: (Spain) Juan Garriga

250cc
Pole position
- Rider: (Italy) Pierfrancesco Chili
- Time: 1:36.259
Fastest lap
- Rider: (Italy) Pierfrancesco Chili
- Time: 1:35.857
Podium
- First: (Italy) Pierfrancesco Chili
- Second: (Italy) Loris Reggiani
- Third: (Italy) Doriano Romboni

125cc
Pole position
- Rider: (Italy) Bruno Casanova
- Time: 1:42.344
Fastest lap
- Rider: Unknown
Podium
- First: (Italy) Fausto Gresini
- Second: (Italy) Alessandro Gramigni
- Third: (Japan) Noboru Ueda

The 1992 British motorcycle Grand Prix was the eleventh round of the 1992 Grand Prix motorcycle racing season. It took place on the weekend of 31 July-2 August 1992 at Donington Park.

== 500 cc race report ==
This race was most notable for Wayne Gardner's last career victory, Kevin Schwantz' stealing of the marshall flag to instruct riders of oil after going down, the late-stage comeback from Wayne Rainey to pass Wayne Gardner for the win and Joan Garriga's only podium finish in the 500cc class.

Mick Doohan was still not ready to race due to his leg injury he sustained during qualifying at the Dutch round. It became life-threatening and the right leg had to be fused to his left in order for the right to heal. Wayne Rainey commented: "When Mick didn't show up people started to realize how bad his leg was. I was racing against a ghost."

Before the start of the race, on Saturday, Wayne Gardner announces his retirement, effective at the end of the season. He won the World Championship in 1987 but a multitude of injuries, the emergence of American riders such as Eddie Lawson and Wayne Rainey, as well as fellow Australian Doohan, had stalled his career.

On Saturday, Eddie Lawson scores his second pole position of the season with a time of 1:33.814. Second is John Kocinski, followed by Wayne Rainey in third and Wayne Gardner in fourth. The second row consists of Kevin Schwantz in fifth, Juan Garriga in sixth, Niggi Schmassmann in seventh and Miguel Duhamel in eighth.

All riders take off and do their usual warm-up lap before lining up in their respective grid slots. As the lights go out, it is Kocinski who gets the best start and moves up in the lead entering Redgate (Turn 1), followed by teammate Rainey who is a close second. In third place is Lawson, who has lost both places to the Marlboro Team Roberts duo with Schwantz now in fourth after overtaking Gardner, who is now in fifth position on the opening lap. Sixth is wildcard rider Carl Fogarty. Exiting Redgate, Wainey wastes no time and passes his teammate at the inside to take over the lead, with Lawson going up Kocinski's inside as well to snatch second from him at the Old Hairpin (Turn 4). Fogarty then passes Gardner at the same corner to take fifth, now immediately behind Schwantz entering Starkey's Bridge (Turn 6). Exiting McLean's (Turn 7), Gardner tries a move around the outside of Fogarty, goes side-by-side with him through the short straight and finalises the move entering Coppice (Turn 8). Also at Coppice, Schwantz dives down the inside of Kocinski and takes third from him. At the exit of Starkey's Straight, Gardner closed up enough and goes up the inside of Kocinski to pass him and go into fourth position.

On lap two, Gardner now closes up on Schwantz. The top six is a follows: Rainey, Lawson, Schwantz, Gardner, Kocinski and Fogarty. Gardner has opened up a small gap to Fogarty entering McLean's, who has passed Kocinski already. At the end of Starkey's Straight, Gardner makes a move on Schwantz and takes third place entering The Esses. Behind him, Garriga also makes a pass on a now struggling Kocinski at The Esses for sixth spot.

Lap three and the top six is as follows: Rainey, Lawson, Gardner, Schwantz, Fogarty and Garriga. Exiting Hollywood (Turn 2), Gardner closes right up on the rear of Lawson but is not yet able to make a move at the Old Hairpin. Entering Coppice, the Australian is now right behind Lawson, then passes him easily thanks to his Honda power at the entrance of Starkey's Straight, promoting him to second place.

On lap four, Gardner is now hunting down leader Rainey. Further back, fifth place Fogarty is now coming under pressure of Garriga. At the end of Wheatcroft Straight, Garriga has a look up Fogarty's inside but is not able to get by. Schwantz has now also closed up to the rear of Lawson, Gardner doing the same on Rainey. At The Esses, Garriga makes a late lunge up Fogarty's inside, passing him for fifth place. Fogarty tries to fight back at the Melbourne Hairpin (Turn 10) but is not able to retake the position. In front of them, Schwantz goes up the inside of Lawson and takes third place from him.

Lap five and Gardner is still catching Rainey at the front. The top six is as follows: Rainey, Gardner, Schwantz, Lawson, Garriga and Fogarty. At Starkey's Straight, Gardner looks behind to see how far behind Schwantz is.

On lap six, Gardner has fully caught up to Rainey now. At Starkey's Straight, Gardner makes good use of the slipstream to go side-by-side and pass Rainey entering The Esses, taking over the lead as the British crowd explodes in cheers. At the Melbourne Hairpin, Gardner then runs wide and goes side-by-side with Rainey again but keeps the lead entering Goddards (Turn 12).

As the crowd cheers on Gardner, he crosses the line to start lap seven. The fighting allows Schwantz and Lawson to catch up to the duo. Gardner is now opening up a small gap to Rainey. At Starkey's Straight, Gardner again looks behind to see where Rainey is. Garriga in fifth is now slowly closing up to Lawson's Cagiva as well.

Lap eight and behind Rainey a three-man train starts to form. The top six is as follows: Gardner, Rainey, Schwantz, Lawson, Garriga and Fogarty. Gardner continues to increase his gap to second place Rainey, as he now comes under serious pressure from Rainey. Garriga is still closing up to Lawson, too. Exiting the Melbourne Hairpin, Schwantz has a slight moment but does not lose any time.

On lap nine, Garriga is almost behind Lawson now. At Coppice, Schwantz makes a move on Rainey by diving down his inside for second, the crowd cheering and clapping as he does so. Rainey tries to fight back at the end of Starkey's Straight but lacks the power to make the move. Rainey and Schwantz have then also closed the gap to and caught Gardner. At the Melbourne Hairpin, Garriga tries a dive down Lawson's inside but isn't able to get by.

Lap ten and the top six is as follows: Gardner, Schwantz, Rainey, Lawson, Garriga and Fogarty. Exiting the Old Hairpin, Schwantz closes right up, then dives down Gardner's inside to take over the lead at the entrance of Starkey's Bridge. The fans all around the circuit are cheering for the on-track action. Exiting the Melbourne Hairpin, Schwantz has a quick look behind him to see where Gardner is. Behind him, Rainey is now coming under pressure from Lawson as the duo at the front are opening up a small gap.

On lap eleven, the top six is as follows: Schwantz, Gardner, Rainey, Lawson, Garriga and Fogarty. Randy Mamola has crashed out of contention, highsiding his bike after touching the white line at the exit of the Melbourne Hairpin, the marshalls recovering his stricken bike from the circuit as one assists a limping but not badly hurt Mamola.

Lap twelve and Gardner has a look up the inside of Schwantz at the entry of Redgate. At the short straight before Coppice, Schwantz looks behind him briefly to see where Gardner is - who is now right behind him again. At Starkey's Straight, he passes his Lucky Strike Suzuki easily before The Esses.

On lap thirteen, the top six is as follows: Gardner, Schwantz, Rainey, Lawson, Garriga and Kocinski - who has passed Fogarty. At Starkey's Straight, Gardner opens up a gap to Schwantz. Rainey is now coming under pressure from Lawson again.

Lap fourteen and Rainey is right behind Schwantz at Wheatcroft Straight, diving down his inside and passing him at Redgate for second place. A trio has now formed, consisting of Rainey, Schwantz and Lawson, with Garriga a bit further back as he has lost touch with the three Americans. Exiting The Esses, it is Rainey who opens up a small gap to Schwantz, with Garriga closing the gap to Lawson.

On lap fifteen - the halfway point of the race - Gardner increases his gap on Rainey. At the entry of McLean's, Lawson has a look up the inside of Schwantz but stays behind him for now. Cees Doorakkers gets lapped by all the riders as he takes a very wide line at Goddards, allowing them all to pass without problems.

Lap sixteen and the front is still stable. Schwantz has closed up to Rainey again. Further back, Kocinski is now coming under pressure from Niall Mackenzie, trying to make a pass on him at the Old Hairpin but failing and almost crashing into the American as a result. Mackenzie then shadows Kocinski throughout the remainder of the lap.

On lap seventeen, Mackenzie is still all over the rear of Kocinski. At the front, Rainey is closing the gap to Gardner, himself coming under pressure from Schwantz now.

Lap eighteen and Rainey tries a move up the inside of Gardner at Redgate, failing and staying behind for the time being. Exiting the Craner Curves, Schwantz is right behind Rainey and lunges up his inside, surprising him and snatching second away from him at the Old Hairpin. This gives Gardner some breathing room, but not for long as Schwantz now starts closing up on him. At the start of Starkey's Straight, the Australian looks behind to see how far behind Schwantz is. Exiting The Esses, the group has to deal with two backmarkers - Schmassmann and Peter Graves. Schmassmann can't get out of the way in time, blocking Gardner in the middle of the Melbourne Hairpin but passing Graves without any problems. As Lawson slows down for the hairpin, Garriga grabs his chance and dives down his inside, passing him for fourth as a result. Schwantz gets blocked by Graves at Goddards, costing him vital time to leader Gardner and allowing Rainey to catch up.

On lap nineteen, Schwantz manages to pass Graves. However, furious that he got blocked, he sticks his arm out back and gives him the middle finger to show his discontent with him. The top six is as follows: Gardner, Schwantz, Rainey, Garriga, Lawson and Michael Rudroff. Gardner has opened up a relatively big gap thanks to all the passes, but Schwantz and Rainey catch up to the Australian at the exit of Starkey's Straight. Mackenzie rides slowly out of Coppice, exiting the race with a mechanical failure.

Lap twenty and the top six is now as follows: Gardner, Schwantz, Rainey, Garriga, Lawson and Kocinski - who has repassed Rudroff. Garriga is closing up on Rainey's rear as Lawson starts losing touch with the Spaniard in front of him. Mackenzie is seen pushing his bike with his leg at the grass next to Starkey's Straight.

On lap twenty-one, the front positions are stable. Rainey looks behind to see how far Garriga is at the beginning of Starkey's Straight. Mackenzie is still pushing his bike on at the grass next to Starkey's Straight.

Lap twenty-two and Garriga closes up to Rainey again. Gardner approaches three backmarkers now - Serge David, Toshiyuki Arakaki and another rider. Gardner gets through easily at the entrance of Coppice, Schwantz doing likewise at the exit of Starkey's Straight, but Rainey has more trouble, getting stuck and losing ground to Schwantz as a result. Garriga also is not able to get by, the duo only able to get by at the Melbourne Hairpin.

On lap twenty-three, the backmarkers have created a big gap from Schwantz to Rainey in third place. No overtakes happened at the front.

Lap twenty-four and the top six is as follows: Gardner, Schwantz, Rainey, Garriga, Lawson and Kocinski. Exiting Coppice, Rainey has a slight moment but does not lose any time from it.

On lap twenty-five, Gardner is still out in front with Schwantz and Rainey chasing him down. Rainey is closing up on Schwantz, but his teammate Kocinski blows his engine, spewing liquid onto the track at Redgate and parking up on the grass on the inside of the bend. Bikes race by before Fogarty hits the invisible spillage and slides into the gravel on the outside of Redgate.

Lap twenty-six and entering Redgate, Schwantz slides out of contention and into the gravel trap from a strong second place. Marshalls immediately assist him away from the circuit as other marshalls recover his bike. He looks back at the track in anger, seeing three bikes all parked on the same bend, and making gestures of displeasure with his arms. As the marshalls are recovering his bike and Fogarty walks away from the scene, the crowd cheers as Schwantz grabs the red and yellow striped flag and crosses the circuit to indicate to the oncoming riders that there is oil on the track; furious at the marshall for not using it himself. He gives it back eventually and trudges away.

On lap twenty-seven, Schwantz is still on the grass at Redgate, dangerously close to the corner as he still instructs the marshall to use the flag. In the back, teammate Chandler also stepped onto the gravel to see what's going on. He then walks away from the scene, recovering his helmet and gloves from a spectator who was lucky enough to hold it for him. The crowd cheers him as he walks away. At the front, Rainey is doing his best to catch Gardner as Garriga is now promoted to third. At Starkey's Straight, Gardner looks behind to see how far behind Rainey is, the Australian now running into two backmarkers in the likes of Rudroff and Doorakkers (again). Doorakkers gets out of the way at the beginning of The Esses, Gardner having to make a lunge up the inside of Rudroff to get past him at Goddards.

Lap twenty-eight and Schwantz is kneeling next to Redgate, watching the riders pass at a dangerously close position. He sits on his helmet and instructs the riders to slow down due to the oil on track. Gardner then comes up to backmarker Duhamel. At Starkey's Straight, Duhamel instructs Garder to go by with his hand and slows down, looking back to see the Australian blast past without a problem.

On lap twenty-nine, the penultimate lap, Rainey has passed Duhamel and is still trying to close down the gap. The top six is now: Gardner, Rainey, Garriga, Lawson, Peter Goddard and Terry Rymer. Rainey is still closing down the gap to Gardner as an unhappy Fogarty has arrived in the pits and is interviewed by the media.

Gardner crosses the line to start the final lap - lap thirty. Rainey does everything he can to try and catch up with him, but is still too far when Rainey looks behind him at Starkey's Straight. At the Melbourne Hairpin, Gardner has to deal with one more backmarker, Marco Papa. Papa gets out of the way at the hairpin, allowing Gardner to take the final corner and cross the line with a big wheelie to win the race - his first win of the season and the last win of his career. Schwantz is also seen cheering for Gardner at the finish line, Rainey throwing up his hand in a questioning manner.

On the parade lap back to parc-fermé, Gardner puts his arm in the air in glee. Gardner stops at Redgate, Rainey and Garriga doing likewise. The marshalls surround them, as do some of the fans who have invaded the track.

Later on, Rainey was taken away on a stretcher to the local medical centre.

On the podium, Rainey is missing the podium celebration for a then unknown reason. The trophy gets handed to Garriga, who annoyingly shouts at the podium to give him a cheer. The trophy then gets handed out to Gardner, the crowd cheering as he lifts his trophy. The Australian national anthem plays for Gardner, the champagne being handed out to the two after. The duo spray each other, then at the crowd.

Commenting on his crash and marshalling afterwards, Schwantz said the following:

"I checked nobody was coming and ran across to the flag marshall and grabbed the oil flag because he was just standing there with it not doing anything much and was half way round the corner — I got back up the straight twenty or twenty five yards so that I could flag and signal to everybody to get on the outside line. Kocinski's bike had broken a primary gear and that had come out the side of the cases, gas, oil and everything went everywhere. ... A lot of guys out there thanked me for getting on the flags. Gardner and Rymer said that had I not got the flag out other people would have fallen because the marshals weren't doing what they were supposed to."

== 500 cc classification ==
Pos.	Rider	Team	Manufacturer	Time/Retired	Points
1	(Australia) Wayne Gardner	Rothmans Kanemoto Honda	Honda	47:38.373	20
2	(United States) Wayne Rainey	Marlboro Team Roberts	Yamaha	+0.855	15
3	(Spain) Juan Garriga	Ducados Yamaha	Yamaha	+5.915	12
4	(United States) Eddie Lawson	Cagiva Team Agostini	Cagiva	+26.079	10
5	(Australia) Peter Goddard	Valvoline Team WCM	ROC Yamaha	+1:04.091	8
6	(United Kingdom) Terry Rymer	Padgett's Motorcycles	Harris-Yamaha	+1:22.330	6
7	(Canada) Miguel Duhamel	Yamaha Motor Banco	Yamaha	+1 Lap	4
8	(Germany) Michael Rudroff	Rallye Sport	Harris-Yamaha	+1 Lap	3
9	(France) Dominique Sarron	Team ROC Banco	ROC Yamaha	+1 Lap	2
10	(Japan) Toshiyuki Arakaki	Team ROC Banco	ROC Yamaha	+1 Lap	1
11	(Switzerland) Serge David	Team ROC Banco	ROC Yamaha	+1 Lap	
12	(France) Bruno Bonhuil	Ville de Paris	ROC Yamaha	+1 Lap	
13	(Switzerland) Nicholas Schmassman	Uvex Racing Team	ROC Yamaha	+1 Lap	
14	(United Kingdom) Peter Graves	Peter Graves Racing Team	Harris-Yamaha	+1 Lap	
15	(Netherlands) Cees Doorakkers	HEK Racing Team	Harris-Yamaha	+1 Lap	
16	(Italy) Marco Papa	Librenti Corse	Librenti	+1 Lap	
Ret (17)	(United States) Kevin Schwantz	Lucky Strike Suzuki	Suzuki	Retirement	
Ret (18)	(Republic of Ireland) Eddie Laycock	Milla Racing	Yamaha	Retirement	
Ret (19)	(Luxembourg) Andreas Leuthe	VRP Racing Team	VRP	Retirement	
Ret (20)	(Austria) Josef Doppler	Uvex Racing Team	ROC Yamaha	Retirement	
Ret (21)	(Spain) Àlex Crivillé	Campsa Honda Team	Honda	Retirement	
Ret (22)	(United Kingdom) Kevin Mitchell	MBM Racing	Harris-Yamaha	Retirement	
Ret (23)	(United States) Randy Mamola	Budweiser Team/Global Motorsports	Yamaha	Retirement	
Ret (24)	(United Kingdom) Carl Fogarty	MBM Racing	Yamaha	Retirement	
Ret (25)	(United Kingdom) James Whitham	Padgett's Motorcycles	Yamaha	Retirement	
Ret (26)	(Italy) Lucio Pedercini	Paton Grand Prix	Paton	Retirement	
Ret (27)	(United Kingdom) Niall Mackenzie	Yamaha Motor Banco	Yamaha	Retirement	
Ret (28)	(United States) John Kocinski	Marlboro Team Roberts	Yamaha	Retirement	
Ret (29)	(United States) Doug Chandler	Lucky Strike Suzuki	Suzuki	Retirement	
Ret (30)	(Italy) Corrado Catalano	KCS International	ROC Yamaha	Retirement	

Previous race: 1992 French Grand Prix	FIM Grand Prix World Championship; 1992 season	Next race: 1992 Brazilian Grand Prix
Previous race: 1991 British Grand Prix	British Grand Prix	Next race: 1993 British Grand Prix
