= 1992 French motorcycle Grand Prix =

(France) 1992 French Grand Prix
Race details
- Race 10 of 13 races in the 1992 Grand Prix motorcycle racing season
- Date: 19 July 1992
- Official name: Grand Prix de France 92
- Location: Circuit de Nevers Magny-Cours
- Course: Permanent racing facility; 4.250 km (2.641 mi)

500cc
Pole position
- Rider: (United States) Doug Chandler
- Time: 1:38.524
Fastest lap
- Rider: (Australia) Wayne Gardner
- Time: 1:39.273
Podium
- First: (United States) Wayne Rainey
- Second: (Australia) Wayne Gardner
- Third: (United States) John Kocinski

250cc
Pole position
- Rider: (Italy) Pierfrancesco Chili
- Time: 1:41.215
Fastest lap
- Rider: (Italy) Loris Reggiani
- Time: 1:41.428
Podium
- First: (Italy) Loris Reggiani
- Second: (Italy) Pierfrancesco Chili
- Third: (Italy) Luca Cadalora

125cc
Pole position
- Rider: (Italy) Ezio Gianola
- Time: 1:47.530
Fastest lap
- Rider: (Italy) Ezio Gianola
- Time: 1:46.674
Podium
- First: (Italy) Ezio Gianola
- Second: (Japan) Noboru Ueda
- Third: (Spain) Jorge Martínez

The 1992 French motorcycle Grand Prix was the tenth round of the 1992 Grand Prix motorcycle racing season. It took place on the weekend of 17–19 July 1992 at the Magny Cours circuit.

== 500 cc race report ==
Doug Chandler was on pole, from Wayne Rainey, John Kocinski and Wayne Gardner. Kevin Schwantz was on the 2nd row. Kocinski got the lead at the start, but Rainey soon moved into first. Rainey opened a small gap to Gardner, Kocinski and Chandler. Schwantz was down in 8th. Chandler out of the race from 3rd place. Miguel Duhamel was in a battle with Mamola for 7th. Schwantz: "There were about eight laps to go and I got into this tight right bander, not hot, got the bike set, turning and the front started to push. I just couldn't do anything with it physically to try and to the bike stood back up. I was just hanging off the inside had the thing turned, was already committed with the thing back on the gas when it started to push. I couldn't do anything as far as try to stand the thing up because of my arm, I just didn't have the strength."

== 500 cc classification ==
Pos.	Rider	Team	Manufacturer	Time/Retired	Points
1	(United States) Wayne Rainey	Marlboro Team Roberts	Yamaha	45:05.182	20
2	(Australia) Wayne Gardner	Rothmans Kanemoto Honda	Honda	+6.682	15
3	(United States) John Kocinski	Marlboro Team Roberts	Yamaha	+8.687	12
4	(Spain) Juan Garriga	Ducados Yamaha	Yamaha	+11.645	10
5	(United States) Eddie Lawson	Cagiva Team Agostini	Cagiva	+33.901	8
6	(United Kingdom) Niall Mackenzie	Yamaha Motor Banco	Yamaha	+45.706	6
7	(Canada) Miguel Duhamel	Yamaha Motor Banco	Yamaha	+51.449	4
8	(United States) Randy Mamola	Budweiser Team/Global Motorsports	Yamaha	+57.215	3
9	(United Kingdom) James Whitham	Padgett's Motorcycles	Harris Yamaha	+1:26.833	2
10	(Japan) Toshiyuki Arakaki	Team ROC Banco	ROC Yamaha	+1:39.291	1
11	(New Zealand) Andrew Stroud	Valvoline Team WCM	ROC Yamaha	+1:44.567	
12	(Switzerland) Serge David	Team ROC Banco	ROC Yamaha	+1 Lap	
13	(Netherlands) Cees Doorakkers	HEK Racing Team	Harris Yamaha	+1 Lap	
14	(Germany) Michael Rudroff	Rallye Sport	Harris Yamaha	+1 Lap	
15	(Switzerland) Nicholas Schmassman	Uvex Racing Team	ROC Yamaha	+1 Lap	
16	(United Kingdom) Peter Graves	Peter Graves Racing Team	Harris Yamaha	+1 Lap	
17	(Austria) Josef Doppler	Uvex Racing Team	ROC Yamaha	+1 Lap	
18	(Italy) Marco Papa	Librenti Corse	Librenti	+2 Laps	
Ret (19)	(United States) Kevin Schwantz	Lucky Strike Suzuki	Suzuki	Retirement	
Ret (20)	(United Kingdom) Kevin Mitchell	MBM Racing	Harris Yamaha	Retirement	
Ret (21)	(France) Dominique Sarron	Team ROC Banco	ROC Yamaha	Retirement	
Ret (22)	(United States) Doug Chandler	Lucky Strike Suzuki	Suzuki	Retirement	
Ret (23)	(Spain) Àlex Crivillé	Campsa Honda Team	Honda	Retirement	
Ret (24)	(Republic of Ireland) Eddie Laycock	Milla Racing	Yamaha	Retirement	
Ret (25)	(Italy) Corrado Catalano	KCS International	ROC Yamaha	Retirement	
Ret (26)	(France) Claude Arciero	Arciero Racing Team	ROC Yamaha	Retirement	
DNS	(Brazil) Alex Barros	Cagiva Team Agostini	Cagiva	Did not start	
DNS	(France) Thierry Crine	Ville de Paris	ROC Yamaha	Did not start	
DNS	(France) Bernard Garcia	Yamaha Motor Banco	Yamaha	Did not start	
DNQ	(Luxembourg) Andreas Leuthe	VRP Racing Team	VRP	Did not qualify	
DNQ	(Venezuela) Larry Moreno Vacondio	Team Domina	Yamaha	Did not qualify	

Previous race: 1992 Hungarian Grand Prix	FIM Grand Prix World Championship; 1992 season	Next race: 1992 British Grand Prix
Previous race: 1991 French Grand Prix	French Grand Prix	Next race: 1994 French Grand Prix
