= 1992 Malaysian motorcycle Grand Prix =

(Malaysia) 1992 Malaysian Grand Prix
Race details
- Race 3 of 13 races in the 1992 Grand Prix motorcycle racing season
- Date: 19 April 1992
- Official name: Malaysia Motorcycle Grand Prix
- Location: Shah Alam Circuit
- Course: Permanent racing facility; 3.69 km (2.29 mi)

500cc
Pole position
- Rider: (Australia) Mick Doohan
- Time: 1:25.513
Fastest lap
- Rider: (United States) Wayne Rainey
- Time: 1:26.074
Podium
- First: (Australia) Mick Doohan
- Second: (United States) Wayne Rainey
- Third: (Spain) Àlex Crivillé

250cc
Pole position
- Rider: (Italy) Pierfrancesco Chili
- Time: 1:27.838
Fastest lap
- Rider: (Italy) Luca Cadalora
- Time: 1:29.278
Podium
- First: (Italy) Luca Cadalora
- Second: (Spain) Alberto Puig
- Third: (Italy) Pierfrancesco Chili

125cc
Pole position
- Rider: (Italy) Alessandro Gramigni
- Time: 1:33.155
Fastest lap
- Rider: (Germany) Ralf Waldmann
- Time: 1:33.587
Podium
- First: (Italy) Alessandro Gramigni
- Second: (Italy) Bruno Casanova
- Third: (Germany) Ralf Waldmann

The 1992 Malaysian motorcycle Grand Prix was the third round of the 1992 Grand Prix motorcycle racing season. It took place on the weekend of 17–19 April 1992 at the Shah Alam Circuit.

== 500 cc race report ==
Kevin Schwantz injured his hand in practice and missed the race. Mick Doohan was on pole and got the lead at the start from Àlex Crivillé and Wayne Rainey. Then Doohan got a small gap while Rainey moved into 2nd. Rain brought out a red flag; 18 laps for a second leg in intermediate conditions. After one or two laps, Doohan was again at the front, followed by Juan Garriga. The rain started pouring and there was another red flag, ending the race.

== 500 cc classification ==
Pos.	Rider	Team	Manufacturer	Time/Retired	Points
1	(Australia) Mick Doohan	Rothmans Honda Team	Honda	45:45.608	20
2	(United States) Wayne Rainey	Marlboro Team Roberts	Yamaha	+10.433	15
3	(Spain) Àlex Crivillé	Campsa Honda Team	Honda	+14.307	12
4	(Spain) Juan Garriga	Ducados Yamaha	Yamaha	+27.693	10
5	(United States) Doug Chandler	Lucky Strike Suzuki	Suzuki	+31.429	8
6	(Australia) Daryl Beattie	Team HRC	Honda	+32.279	6
7	(United States) Randy Mamola	Budweiser Team/Global Motorsports	Yamaha	+1:03.497	4
8	(Australia) Peter Goddard	Valvoline Team WCM	ROC Yamaha	+2:02.624	3
9	(Italy) Corrado Catalano	KCS International	ROC Yamaha	+2:06.910	2
10	(Republic of Ireland) Eddie Laycock	Milla Racing	Yamaha	+2:11.932	1
11	(United Kingdom) Kevin Mitchell	MBM Racing	Harris Yamaha	+2:27.337	
12	(Netherlands) Cees Doorakkers	HEK Racing Team	Harris Yamaha	+2:31.293	
13	(Japan) Toshiyuki Arakaki	Team ROC Banco	ROC Yamaha	+1 Lap	
14	(Germany) Michael Rudroff	Rallye Sport	Harris Yamaha	+1 Lap	
15	(Switzerland) Serge David	Team ROC Banco	ROC Yamaha	+2 Laps	
16	(Switzerland) Nicholas Schmassman	Uvex Racing Team	ROC Yamaha	+2 Laps	
Ret (17)	(United States) Eddie Lawson	Cagiva Team Agostini	Cagiva	Retirement	
Ret (18)	(France) Dominique Sarron	Team ROC Banco	ROC Yamaha	Retirement	
Ret (19)	(Canada) Miguel Duhamel	Yamaha Motor Banco	Yamaha	Retirement	
Ret (20)	(United Kingdom) Peter Graves	Peter Graves Racing Team	Harris Yamaha	Retirement	
Ret (21)	(Italy) Marco Papa	Librenti Corse	Librenti	Retirement	
Ret (22)	(France) Thierry Crine	Ville de Paris	ROC Yamaha	Retirement	
Ret (23)	(United Kingdom) Damon Buckmaster	Padgett's Motorcycles	Harris Yamaha	Retirement	
Ret (24)	(Austria) Josef Doppler	Uvex Racing Team	ROC Yamaha	Retirement	
Ret (25)	(United Kingdom) Niall Mackenzie	Yamaha Motor Banco	Yamaha	Retirement	
Ret (26)	(Brazil) Alex Barros	Cagiva Team Agostini	Cagiva	Retirement	

Previous race: 1992 Australian Grand Prix	FIM Grand Prix World Championship; 1992 season	Next race: 1992 Spanish Grand Prix
Previous race: 1991 Malaysian Grand Prix	Malaysian Grand Prix	Next race: 1993 Malaysian Grand Prix
