= 1992 Japanese motorcycle Grand Prix =

(Japan) 1992 Japanese Grand Prix
Race details
- Race 1 of 13 races in the 1992 Grand Prix motorcycle racing season
- Date: 29 March 1992
- Official name: Japanese Grand Prix
- Location: Suzuka Circuit
- Course: Permanent racing facility; 5.821 km (3.617 mi)

500cc
Pole position
- Rider: (United States) Kevin Schwantz
- Time: 2:20.324
Fastest lap
- Rider: (Australia) Mick Doohan
- Time: 2:32.090
Podium
- First: (Australia) Mick Doohan
- Second: (United States) Doug Chandler
- Third: (United States) Kevin Schwantz

250cc
Pole position
- Rider: (Japan) Nobuatsu Aoki
- Time: 2:18.696
Fastest lap
- Rider: (Italy) Luca Cadalora
- Time: 2:35.962
Podium
- First: (Italy) Luca Cadalora
- Second: (Japan) Tadayuki Okada
- Third: (Japan) Nobuatsu Aoki

125cc
Pole position
- Rider: (Italy) Bruno Casanova
- Time: 2:23.630
Fastest lap
- Rider: (Germany) Ralf Waldmann
- Time: 2:39.888
Podium
- First: (Germany) Ralf Waldmann
- Second: (Italy) Bruno Casanova
- Third: (Japan) Nobuyuki Wakai

The 1992 Japanese motorcycle Grand Prix was the first round of the 1992 Grand Prix motorcycle racing season. It took place on the weekend of 27–29 March 1992 at the Suzuka Circuit.

== 500 cc race report ==
Wet race. Wayne Rainey had to ride with an injured hand from a pre-season test (part of his pinky was removed).

Kevin Schwantz was on pole, and took the lead at the start from Doug Chandler and Mick Doohan. Rainey had a bad start.

Àlex Crivillé crashed out of his debut 500cc race; Wayne Gardner crashes out, as did Rainey at the Dunlop Corner.

Chandler took the lead of a 4-man group with Schwantz, Doohan and Kocinski. Kocinski crashed out.

Doohan and Chandler dropped Schwantz. Gardner had remounted and gotten to 5th before crashing out for good a second time and breaking his leg in two places.

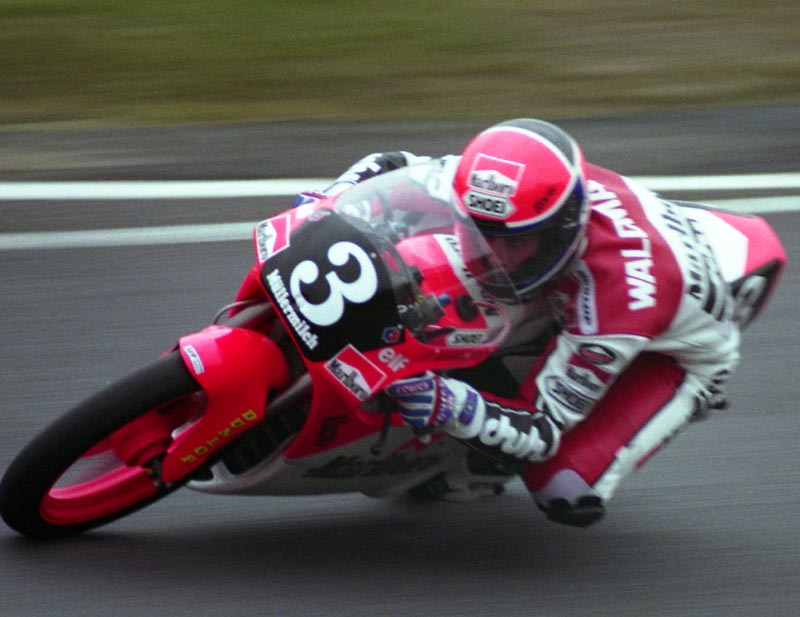
Ralf Waldmann, riding his bike at the 125cc race, which he went on to win.

== 500 cc classification ==
Pos	Rider	Team	Manufacturer	Time/Retired	Points
1	(Australia) Mick Doohan	Rothmans Honda Team	Honda	56:21.831	20
2	(United States) Doug Chandler	Lucky Strike Suzuki	Suzuki	+28.298	15
3	(United States) Kevin Schwantz	Lucky Strike Suzuki	Suzuki	+55.792	12
4	(Japan) Shinichi Itoh	Team HRC	Honda	+1:47.802	10
5	(United States) Randy Mamola	Budweiser Team/Global Motorsports	Yamaha	+2:00.984	8
6	(Japan) Keiji Ohishi	SRT	Suzuki	+2:13.708	6
7	(United Kingdom) Niall Mackenzie	Yamaha Motor Banco	Yamaha	+2:15.005	4
8	(Japan) Toshihiko Honma	Hiro Racing Team Yamaha	Yamaha	+2:15.491	3
9	(Japan) Norihiko Fujiwara	Kirin Mets Racing Team	Yamaha	+2:16.591	2
10	(Japan) Satoshi Tsujimoto	AM/PM Racing	Honda	+2:27.265	1
11	(Brazil) Alex Barros	Cagiva Team Agostini	Cagiva	+1 Lap	
12	(Spain) Juan Garriga	Ducados Yamaha	Yamaha	+1 Lap	
13	(Japan) Keiichiro Iwahashi	Team Blue Fox	Honda	+1 Lap	
14	(United States) Eddie Lawson	Cagiva Team Agostini	Cagiva	+1 Lap	
15	(Germany) Michael Rudroff	Rallye Sport	Harris Yamaha	+1 Lap	
16	(Italy) Corrado Catalano	KCS International	ROC Yamaha	+1 Lap	
Ret (17)	(Australia) Wayne Gardner	Rothmans Kanemoto Honda	Honda	Retirement	
Ret (18)	(United States) John Kocinski	Marlboro Team Roberts	Yamaha	Retirement	
Ret (19)	(Canada) Miguel Duhamel	Yamaha Motor Banco	Yamaha	Retirement	
Ret (20)	(United States) Wayne Rainey	Marlboro Team Roberts	Yamaha	Retirement	
Ret (21)	(Australia) Peter Goddard	Valvoline Team WCM	ROC Yamaha	Retirement	
Ret (22)	(Spain) Àlex Crivillé	Campsa Honda Team	Honda	Retirement	
Ret (23)	(Australia) Daryl Beattie	Team HRC	Honda	Retirement	
DNQ	(Republic of Ireland) Eddie Laycock	Milla Racing	Yamaha	Did not qualify	
DNQ	(France) Dominique Sarron	Team ROC Banco	ROC Yamaha	Did not qualify	
DNQ	(Netherlands) Cees Doorakkers	HEK Racing Team	Harris Yamaha	Did not qualify	
DNQ	(Italy) Marco Papa	Librenti Corse	Librenti	Did not qualify	
DNQ	(United Kingdom) Simon Buckmaster	Padgett's Motorcycles	ROC Yamaha	Did not qualify	
DNQ	(Italy) Lucio Pedercini	Paton Grand Prix	Paton	Did not qualify	
DNQ	(Austria) Josef Doppler	Uvex Racing Team	ROC Yamaha	Did not qualify	
DNQ	(United Kingdom) Kevin Mitchell	MBM Racing	Harris Yamaha	Did not qualify	
DNQ	(Switzerland) Serge David	Team ROC	ROC Yamaha	Did not qualify	
DNQ	(Luxembourg) Andreas Leuthe	VRP Racing Team	VRP	Did not qualify	
DNQ	(United Kingdom) Peter Graves	Peter Graves Racing Team	Harris Yamaha	Did not qualify	
DNQ	(France) Thierry Crine	Ville de Paris	ROC Yamaha	Did not qualify	
DNQ	(Japan) Toshiyuki Arakaki	Team ROC Banco	ROC Yamaha	Did not qualify	

Previous race: 1991 Malaysian Grand Prix	FIM Grand Prix World Championship; 1992 season	Next race: 1992 Australian Grand Prix
Previous race: 1991 Japanese Grand Prix	Japanese Grand Prix	Next race: 1993 Japanese Grand Prix
