= 1992 Australian motorcycle Grand Prix =

(Australia) 1992 Australian Grand Prix
Race details
- Race 2 of 13 races in the 1992 Grand Prix motorcycle racing season
- Date: 12 April 1992
- Official name: Foster's Australian Motorcycle Grand Prix
- Location: Eastern Creek Raceway
- Course: Permanent racing facility; 3.930 km (2.442 mi)

500cc
Pole position
- Rider: (Australia) Mick Doohan
- Time: 1:30.756
Fastest lap
- Rider: (Australia) Mick Doohan
- Time: 1:31.411
Podium
- First: (Australia) Mick Doohan
- Second: (United States) Wayne Rainey
- Third: (Australia) Daryl Beattie

250cc
Pole position
- Rider: (Germany) Helmut Bradl
- Time: 1:33.980
Fastest lap
- Rider: (Spain) Carlos Cardús
- Time: 1:34.797
Podium
- First: (Italy) Luca Cadalora
- Second: (Spain) Carlos Cardús
- Third: (Germany) Helmut Bradl

125cc
Pole position
- Rider: (Japan) Kazuto Sakata
- Time: 1:39.834
Fastest lap
- Rider: (Italy) Bruno Casanova
- Time: 1:40.013
Podium
- First: (Germany) Ralf Waldmann
- Second: (Italy) Alessandro Gramigni
- Third: (Italy) Bruno Casanova

The 1992 Australian motorcycle Grand Prix was the second round of the 1992 Grand Prix motorcycle racing season. It took place on the weekend of 10–12 April 1992 at Eastern Creek Raceway.

== 500 cc race report ==
John Kocinski was injured in practice and missed the race.

Mick Doohan started on pole, and led away with Wayne Rainey and they swapped places, with Daryl Beattie in 3rd. Kevin Schwantz and Doug Chandler battled for 4th.

== 500 cc classification ==
Pos.	Rider	Team	Manufacturer	Time/Retired	Points
1	(Australia) Mick Doohan	Rothmans Honda Team	Honda	46:04.276	20
2	(United States) Wayne Rainey	Marlboro Team Roberts	Yamaha	+6.822	15
3	(Australia) Daryl Beattie	Team HRC	Honda	+18.425	12
4	(United States) Kevin Schwantz	Lucky Strike Suzuki	Suzuki	+31.062	10
5	(United States) Doug Chandler	Lucky Strike Suzuki	Suzuki	+36.019	8
6	(United States) Eddie Lawson	Cagiva Team Agostini	Cagiva	+1:03.653	6
7	(Spain) Àlex Crivillé	Campsa Honda Team	Honda	+1:51.839	4
8	(United States) Randy Mamola	Budweiser Team/Global Motorsports	Yamaha	+1:55.951	3
9	(Spain) Juan Garriga	Ducados Yamaha	Yamaha	+1:56.250	2
10	(Canada) Miguel Duhamel	Yamaha Motor Banco	Yamaha	+1 Lap	1
11	(Australia) Peter Goddard	Valvoline Team WCM	ROC Yamaha	+1 Lap	
12	(Brazil) Alex Barros	Cagiva Team Agostini	Cagiva	+1 Lap	
13	(France) Thierry Crine	Ville de Paris	Yamaha	+1 Lap	
14	(Italy) Corrado Catalano	KCS International	ROC Yamaha	+1 Lap	
15	(France) Dominique Sarron	Team ROC Banco	ROC Yamaha	+1 Lap	
16	(Japan) Toshiyuki Arakaki	Team ROC Banco	ROC Yamaha	+1 Lap	
17	(Netherlands) Cees Doorakkers	HEK Racing Team	Harris Yamaha	+1 Lap	
18	(Germany) Michael Rudroff	Rallye Sport	Harris Yamaha	+1 Lap	
19	(Switzerland) Serge David	Team ROC Banco	ROC Yamaha	+1 Lap	
20	(United Kingdom) Kevin Mitchell	MBM Racing	Harris Yamaha	+1 Lap	
21	(United Kingdom) Damon Buckmaster	Padgett's Motorcycles	Harris Yamaha	+2 Laps	
22	(Switzerland) Nicholas Schmassman	Uvex Racing Team	ROC Yamaha	+2 Laps	
Ret (23)	(Austria) Josef Doppler	Uvex Racing Team	ROC Yamaha	Retirement	
Ret (24)	(Republic of Ireland) Eddie Laycock	Milla Racing	Yamaha	Retirement	
Ret (25)	(United Kingdom) Niall Mackenzie	Yamaha Motor Banco	Yamaha	Retirement	
Ret (26)	(Italy) Lucio Pedercini	Paton Grand Prix	Paton	Retirement	
Ret (27)	(Italy) Marco Papa	Librenti Corse	Librenti	Retirement	
Ret (28)	(United Kingdom) Peter Graves	Peter Graves Racing Team	Harris Yamaha	Retirement	
DNS	(United States) John Kocinski	Marlboro Team Roberts	Yamaha	Did not start	

Previous race: 1992 Japanese Grand Prix	FIM Grand Prix World Championship; 1992 season	Next race: 1992 Malaysian Grand Prix
Previous race: 1991 Australian Grand Prix	Australian motorcycle Grand Prix	Next race: 1993 Australian Grand Prix
