= 1992 German motorcycle Grand Prix =

(Germany) 1992 German Grand Prix
Race details
- Race 7 of 13 races in the 1992 Grand Prix motorcycle racing season
- Date: 14 June 1992
- Official name: Großer Preis von Deutschland Motorräder
- Location: Hockenheimring
- Course: Permanent racing facility; 6.823 km (4.240 mi)

500cc
Pole position
- Rider: (Australia) Mick Doohan
- Time: 1:58.325
Fastest lap
- Rider: (Australia) Mick Doohan
- Time: 1:58.956
Podium
- First: (Australia) Mick Doohan
- Second: (United States) Kevin Schwantz
- Third: (Australia) Wayne Gardner

250cc
Pole position
- Rider: (Italy) Max Biaggi
- Time: 2:06.630
Fastest lap
- Rider: (Italy) Loris Reggiani
- Time: 2:06.499
Podium
- First: (Italy) Pierfrancesco Chili
- Second: (Italy) Max Biaggi
- Third: (Italy) Loris Reggiani

125cc
Pole position
- Rider: (Germany) Ralf Waldmann
- Time: 2:18.346
Fastest lap
- Rider: (Italy) Ezio Gianola
- Time: 2:19.065
Podium
- First: (Italy) Bruno Casanova
- Second: (Italy) Fausto Gresini
- Third: (Germany) Ralf Waldmann

The 1992 German motorcycle Grand Prix, held from the weekend of 12–14 June 1992, at the Hockenheim circuit was the seventh round of the 1992 Grand Prix motorcycle racing season.

== 500cc race ==
Wayne Rainey experienced a big highside during qualifying, leading to multiple injuries, including broken ribs and wrist along with injuring his knee. Despite his injuries, he decided to race, stating, "Mentally, I was down, probably the worst I had ever been in my GP career. I had screwed myself up trying to race with Doohan, and I didn't feel I was getting the support from Yamaha. I was still on the same bike, it was still slow."

Mick Doohan was on pole. John Kocinski took the lead at the start but gave it up to Doohan quickly. Doohan quickly reclaimed it and created a gap over Kevin Schwantz, with the rest trailing behind. Rainey eventually retired from the race, noting, "I ended up pulling in, for the first time in my career, because I was just too hurt to continue... I knew anything could happen, but the only thing for me would be if Mick made a huge mistake. That was possible because I knew he only focused solely on being the fastest guy, winning every race and devastating everybody."

The fight for third between Àlex Crivillé, Wayne Gardner and Kocinski went to experience over youth.

== 500 cc classification ==
Pos.	Rider	Team	Manufacturer	Time/Retired	Points
1	(Australia) Mick Doohan	Rothmans Honda Team	Honda	35:57.895	20
2	(United States) Kevin Schwantz	Lucky Strike Suzuki	Suzuki	+24.626	15
3	(Australia) Wayne Gardner	Rothmans Kanemoto Honda	Honda	+35.765	12
4	(Spain) Àlex Crivillé	Campsa Honda Team	Honda	+35.943	10
5	(United States) John Kocinski	Marlboro Team Roberts	Yamaha	+36.065	8
6	(United States) Eddie Lawson	Cagiva Team Agostini	Cagiva	+36.646	6
7	(Brazil) Alex Barros	Cagiva Team Agostini	Cagiva	+37.920	4
8	(United States) Doug Chandler	Lucky Strike Suzuki	Suzuki	+38.204	3
9	(Spain) Juan Garriga	Ducados Yamaha	Yamaha	+42.263	2
10	(Australia) Peter Goddard	Valvoline Team WCM	ROC Yamaha	+1:10.185	1
11	(Canada) Miguel Duhamel	Yamaha Motor Banco	Yamaha	+1:15.276	
12	(Spain) Juan Lopez Mella	Nivea For Men Team	ROC Yamaha	+1:36.493	
13	(France) Dominique Sarron	Team ROC Banco	ROC Yamaha	+1:37.457	
14	(Germany) Michael Rudroff	Rallye Sport	Harris Yamaha	+1:37.802	
15	(Republic of Ireland) Eddie Laycock	Milla Racing	Yamaha	+1:38.940	
16	(United Kingdom) Kevin Mitchell	MBM Racing	Harris Yamaha	+1 Lap	
17	(United Kingdom) Damon Buckmaster	Padgett's Motorcycles	Harris Yamaha	+1 Lap	
18	(Switzerland) Nicholas Schmassman	Uvex Racing Team	ROC Yamaha	+1 Lap	
19	(Netherlands) Cees Doorakkers	HEK Racing Team	Harris Yamaha	+1 Lap	
20	(Austria) Josef Doppler	Uvex Racing Team	ROC Yamaha	+1 Lap	
21	(United Kingdom) Peter Graves	Peter Graves Racing Team	Harris Yamaha	+1 Lap	
22	(Italy) Lucio Pedercini	Paton Grand Prix	Paton	+1 Lap	
Ret (23)	(Switzerland) Serge David	Team ROC Banco	ROC Yamaha	Retirement	
Ret (24)	(France) Thierry Crine	Ville de Paris	ROC Yamaha	Retirement	
Ret (25)	(Italy) Marco Papa	Librenti Corse	Librenti	Retirement	
Ret (26)	(France) Claude Arciero	Arciero Racing Team	ROC Yamaha	Retirement	
Ret (27)	(Japan) Toshiyuki Arakaki	Team ROC Banco	ROC Yamaha	Retirement	
Ret (28)	(United States) Randy Mamola	Budweiser Team/Global Motorsports	Yamaha	Retirement	
Ret (29)	(United Kingdom) Niall Mackenzie	Yamaha Motor Banco	Yamaha	Retirement	
Ret (30)	(United States) Wayne Rainey	Marlboro Team Roberts	Yamaha	Retirement	
Ret (31)	(Italy) Corrado Catalano	KCS International	ROC Yamaha	Retirement	
DNQ	(Luxembourg) Andreas Leuthe	VRP Racing Team	VRP	Did not qualify	

Previous race: 1992 European Grand Prix	FIM Grand Prix World Championship; 1992 season	Next race: 1992 Dutch TT
Previous race: 1991 German Grand Prix	German Grand Prix	Next race: 1993 German Grand Prix
