= 1992 Italian motorcycle Grand Prix =

(Italy) 1992 Italian Grand Prix
Race details
- Race 5 of 13 races in the 1992 Grand Prix motorcycle racing season
- Date: 24 May 1992
- Official name: Gran Premio d'Italia
- Location: Autodromo Internazionale del Mugello
- Course: Permanent racing facility; 5.245 km (3.259 mi)

500cc
Pole position
- Rider: (Australia) Mick Doohan
- Time: 1:54.048
Fastest lap
- Rider: (United States) Kevin Schwantz
- Time: 1:54.590
Podium
- First: (United States) Kevin Schwantz
- Second: (Australia) Mick Doohan
- Third: (United States) John Kocinski

250cc
Pole position
- Rider: (Italy) Pierfrancesco Chili
- Time: 1:57.880
Fastest lap
- Rider: (Italy) Luca Cadalora
- Time: 1:58.062
Podium
- First: (Italy) Luca Cadalora
- Second: (Italy) Loris Reggiani
- Third: (Italy) Max Biaggi

125cc
Pole position
- Rider: (Italy) Ezio Gianola
- Time: 2:06.230
Fastest lap
- Rider: (Italy) Ezio Gianola
- Time: 2:05.857
Podium
- First: (Italy) Ezio Gianola
- Second: (Germany) Dirk Raudies
- Third: (Japan) Noboru Ueda

The 1992 Italian motorcycle Grand Prix was the fifth race of the 1992 Grand Prix motorcycle racing season. It took place on the weekend of 22–24 May 1992 at the Mugello Circuit.

== 500 cc race report ==
Wayne Gardner, back from injuries, crashed in practice and missed the race. Mick Doohan got the lead at the start and it became a 3-man battle between him, Kevin Schwantz and Wayne Rainey. Rainey crashed out; Doohan, got dropped by Schwantz, almost crashed too.

== 500 cc classification ==
Pos.	Rider	Team	Manufacturer	Time/Retired	Points
1	(United States) Kevin Schwantz	Lucky Strike Suzuki	Suzuki	46:26.225	20
2	(Australia) Mick Doohan	Rothmans Honda Team	Honda	+5.068	15
3	(United States) John Kocinski	Marlboro Team Roberts	Yamaha	+32.542	12
4	(United States) Doug Chandler	Lucky Strike Suzuki	Suzuki	+36.084	10
5	(Brazil) Alex Barros	Cagiva Team Agostini	Cagiva	+43.606	8
6	(Spain) Juan Garriga	Ducados Yamaha	Yamaha	+43.617	6
7	(Canada) Miguel Duhamel	Yamaha Motor Banco	Yamaha	+43.711	4
8	(Spain) Àlex Crivillé	Campsa Honda Team	Honda	+45.139	3
9	(United Kingdom) Niall Mackenzie	Yamaha Motor Banco	Yamaha	+50.894	2
10	(United States) Randy Mamola	Budweiser Team/Global Motorsports	Yamaha	+57.888	1
11	(United States) Eddie Lawson	Cagiva Team Agostini	Cagiva	+1:00.237	
12	(Italy) Corrado Catalano	KCS International	ROC Yamaha	+1:25.780	
13	(France) Thierry Crine	Ville de Paris	ROC Yamaha	+1:37.173	
14	(Republic of Ireland) Eddie Laycock	Milla Racing	Yamaha	+1:51.721	
15	(Japan) Toshiyuki Arakaki	Team ROC Banco	ROC Yamaha	+1:52.268	
16	(Germany) Michael Rudroff	Rallye Sport	Harris Yamaha	+2:04.488	
17	(France) Dominique Sarron	Team ROC Banco	ROC Yamaha	+1 Lap	
18	(Spain) Juan Lopez Mella	Nivea For Men Team	ROC Yamaha	+1 Lap	
19	(Netherlands) Cees Doorakkers	HEK Racing Team	Harris Yamaha	+1 Lap	
20	(United Kingdom) Damon Buckmaster	Padgett's Motorcycles	Harris Yamaha	+1 Lap	
21	(Switzerland) Nicholas Schmassman	Uvex Racing Team	ROC Yamaha	+1 Lap	
22	(United Kingdom) Peter Graves	Peter Graves Racing Team	Harris Yamaha	+1 Lap	
Ret (23)	(United States) Wayne Rainey	Marlboro Team Roberts	Yamaha	Retirement	
Ret (24)	(Switzerland) Serge David	Team ROC Banco	ROC Yamaha	Retirement	
Ret (25)	(Austria) Josef Doppler	Uvex Racing Team	ROC Yamaha	Retirement	
Ret (26)	(Italy) Marco Papa	Librenti Corse	Librenti	Retirement	
Ret (27)	(Italy) Lucio Pedercini	Paton Grand Prix	Paton	Retirement	
Ret (28)	(United Kingdom) Kevin Mitchell	MBM Racing	Harris Yamaha	Retirement	
DNS	(Australia) Wayne Gardner	Rothmans Kanemoto Honda	Honda	Did not start	
DNQ	(Luxembourg) Andreas Leuthe	VRP Racing Team	VRP	Did not qualify	
DNQ	(Venezuela) Larry Moreno Vacondio	Team Domina	Yamaha	Did not qualify	
DNQ	(France) Claude Arciero	Arciero Racing Team	ROC Yamaha	Did not qualify	

Previous race: 1992 Spanish Grand Prix	FIM Grand Prix World Championship; 1992 season	Next race: 1992 European Grand Prix
Previous race: 1991 Italian Grand Prix	Italian Grand Prix	Next race: 1993 Italian Grand Prix
