= 1992 Grand Prix motorcycle racing season =

Sports season

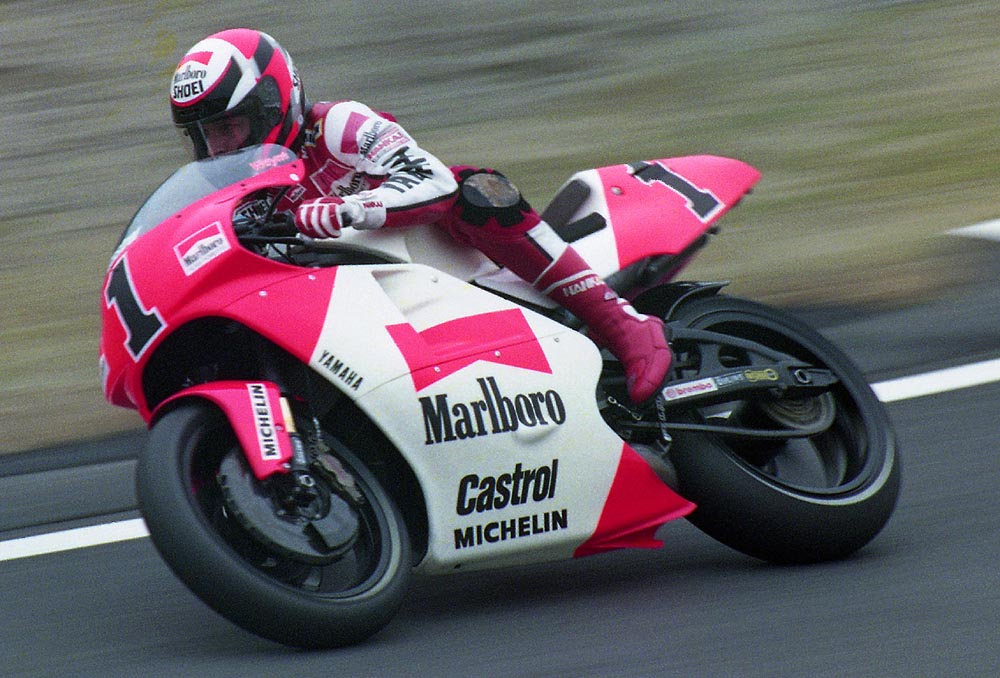
Wayne Rainey (pictured at Suzuka) became the 1992 500cc world champion

The 1992 Grand Prix motorcycle racing season was the 44th F.I.M. Road Racing World Championship season. Honda secured the constructor's title in all three categories.

== Season summaries ==
=== 500cc summary ===
Wayne Rainey won the 1992 World Championship for the third consecutive year on a Kenny Roberts Marlboro Yamaha, however he was largely outshone by a dominant Michael Doohan on his Rothmans Honda, and was only prevented from winning what would have been his first world title by injury.

Doohan won the first four opening rounds, the first he nearly didn't qualify for, due to tricky conditions in Suzuka, but ended up winning as Rainey crashed out in the rain. Rainey followed Doohan home in second in the following three races, still not fully fit due to a broken femur he had suffered at the end of the 1991 season. Daryl Beattie was third at his home race in Australia, riding as a replacement for Wayne Gardner, who injured himself in a crash in the opening round. There were also podiums for Crivillé on his Honda in the third round and Niall Mackenzie on his Team France Yamaha in the fourth round after Crivillé had crashed out of third from his home race at Jerez.

The fifth round at Mugello saw one of the only races of the season where the three best riders of the era - Rainey, Doohan and Kevin Schwantz were fully fit and able to battle it out. Schwantz had missed the third round due to injury but was able to take the victory at Mugello on his Lucky Strike Suzuki as Rainey crashed out whilst battling for the lead. Rainey did however win his first race of the season at Catalunya in round six, passing Doohan for victory with two laps remaining. The seventh round of the season saw Doohan get back to winning ways, but Rainey had to retire due to being unable to continue after riding in pain following a heavy practice fall.

The eighth round at Assen proved to be crucial to the title race. Rainey left the circuit during practice, still being unable to ride comfortably, all but conceding the title to Doohan. However Doohan was to have his own crash in practice, suffering a double-fracture of his right leg and ruling him out for five races. Gardner also injured himself in practice leaving the Rothmans Honda squad without a rider for the race. Schwantz was therefore favorite for the race, but was being heavily challenged by Cagiva's four time world champion and veteran Eddie Lawson. Lawson took both riders out of the race with a collision, which resulted in Schwantz suffering a broken arm. The series of events left a group of riders chasing a rare victory and it was Crivillé who took the win, the first of his career.

Rainey was back for the following round at the Hungaroring, but changeable weather conditions allowed Lawson to take Cagiva's first ever 500cc victory, and Lawson's last in a glittering career. Rainey got back to winning ways in France for the tenth round, however Gardner took a popular win at the British round, with Rainey in second. A patch of oil into the first turn catching out several riders including high flying Schwantz, and teammate Doug Chandler.

The penultimate round of the season saw the return of Doohan, however he was still not fully fit. Rainey won the race, and whilst Doohan was running in the top ten for periods, he wasn't able to maintain the pace and finished twelfth. In the final round Rainey needed to a two-point swing to win the world championship, and although Doohan managed a sterling effort to finish sixth, Rainey's third place was enough to secure him his third and final world title. John Kocinski, Rainey's teammate took his only win of the season, in his last race for Marlboro Roberts Yamaha, and promoted him to third in the world championship table, ahead of Schwantz. Chandler impressed in his first season in the series finishing fifth, whilst Gardner's strong performances when fit saw him good enough for sixth. Juan Garriga was a strong seventh on a Yamaha, with Crivillé impressing in his debut season in eighth, ahead of Lawson took ninth, ahead of Randy Mamola. At the end of 1992 several of the big names of the 80's retired - Lawson, Gardner, and Mamola all left the sport, for different reasons.

The factory Honda riders debuted the "big bang" engine, with the NSR500, where the firing order of the cylinders made the power come out in pulses. The benefit to this was in traction, allowing the tires to adhere between pulses, rather than spin because of the two-stroke 500’s peaky powerband. Yamaha came up with their own version for the 9th round and Suzuki had it available by mid-season, though Schwantz didn't use it initially. The "big bang" concept is still used in today's four-stroke MotoGP bikes.

=== 250cc summary ===
Luca Cadalora claimed his second 250cc crown by a much larger margin than his previous title. He won five out of the first six races on his Rothmans Honda accumulating such a huge points lead that he could afford to be more conservative in the second half of the season. Fellow Italians Loris Reggiani and Pierfrancesco Chili provided Cadalora's strongest competition. Reggiani won two races on his factory Aprilia, whilst Chili put in a number of strong performances winning three races, but failing to finish on a number of occasions, and suffered the embarrassment of thinking he had claimed a podium in the fourth round at Jerez, only to realise he had slowed down prematurely and had in fact been warming down on the final lap. Helmut Bradl had a more disappointing 1992 season, having run Cadalora close for the title in the previous year, the German on the HB Honda failed to win a race, and was often off the pace, back in fifth in the championship standings. 1992 saw the emergence of several future 250cc stars, with Max Biaggi, Chili's teammate, winning several pole positions and winning the final round in his debut season and impressing more and more as the season progressed. Loris Capirossi made the step up from 125s to 250s for the 1992 season. He was largely off the pace at the start of the season as he wasn't given a full works Honda initially, but once provided with a Honda much closer to the performance of Cadalora's as he proved he had the speed to be a contender. Similarly, Doriano Romboni's performances improved in the final few races when his HB Honda was upgraded. Former 250 world champion Carlos Lavado retired at the end of the season having had a very low-key 1992, rarely appearing in the points.

=== 125cc summary ===
Alessandro Gramigni won the first ever 125cc championship for Aprilia, in a tight championship. This was despite Gramigni suffering a broken leg in a road bike accident midway through the season and missing a couple of rounds. Former double 125 champion Fausto Gresini had been consistent throughout the season on his Marlboro Honda, but only won one race, finishing second in the championship. Gresini was looking in serious contention for the championship, but had a critical crash when running in second place in the French round. Honda's Ralf Waldmann finished third in the championship, but had led the series for most of the year having won three of the first four races. His dip in form after that saw him rarely finish on the podium in the second half of the season. Ezio Gianola won the most races in the class - four, yet a number of crashes and low finishes meant he finished fourth in the championship on his Honda, this was a marked up-turn in fortune for Gianola who had considered retiring after a disappointing 1991 season. Aprilia's Bruno Casanova also had a much better 1992 than the previous season, finishing fifth in the championship. His only win coming in the closest race of the season at Hockenheim, where the super fast slipstreaming circuit provided a classic 125 race with the lead changing hands almost every lap. Up and coming Dirk Raudies ended the season well with a victory in the penultimate round in Brazil, and 125 veteran Jorge Martinez became the seventh different winner of the season when he won the final round of the season in South Africa.

== Rule changes and off track events ==
During 1992 Rainey created the International Motorcycle Racers’ Association (IMRA) to pressure track organizers for safety improvements. Michelin came back from a semi-withdrawal and supplied tires to the Honda, Suzuki and Yamaha teams. The points system was revised to award points to the top 10 finishers only, instead of the top 15. This system would last for only the 1992 season, a slightly modified version being brought in for 1993, that is still used today.

The calendar was shortened to 13 rounds, with the United States, Czechoslovakia, Yugoslavia and Austria losing their races. The South African Grand Prix was added and the European Grand Prix continued for another year.

== 1992 Grand Prix season calendar ==
The official 1992 calendar was approved on 28 February 1992. The following Grands Prix were scheduled to take place in 1992:

Round	Date	Grand Prix	Circuit
1	29 March	(Japan) Japanese Grand Prix	Suzuka Circuit
2	12 April	(Australia) Foster's Australian Motorcycle Grand Prix	Eastern Creek Raceway
3	19 April	Malaysia Motorcycle Grand Prix	Shah Alam Circuit
4	10 May	(Spain) Gran Premio Ducados de España	Circuito Permanente de Jerez
5	24 May	(Italy) Gran Premio d'Italia	Mugello Circuit
6	31 May	(Europe) Gran Premio Super Nintendo Entertainment System de Europa	Circuit de Catalunya
7	14 June	(Germany) Großer Preis von Deutschland Motorräder	Hockenheimring
8	27 June	(Netherlands) Dutch TT Assen	TT Circuit Assen
9	12 July	(Hungary) HB Magyar Nagydíj	Hungaroring
10	19 July	Grand Prix de France	Circuit de Nevers Magny-Cours
11	2 August	(United Kingdom) Rothmans British Grand Prix	Donington Park
12	23 August	(Brazil) Brazilian Grand Prix	Autódromo José Carlos Pace
13	6 September	(South Africa) Nashua South African Grand Prix	Kyalami

=== Calendar changes ===
- The United States, Austrian, San Marino and Czechoslovak motorcycle Grand Prix races were taken off the calendar due to a demand from Bernie Ecclestone which started to meddle more with motorcycle racing affairs, along with the IRTA.
- The Hungarian Grand Prix was added to the calendar after a one-year absence on demand of Bernie Ecclestone, who wanted to get more F1 tracks on the calendar.
- The Brazilian Grand Prix was added on the calendar after a two-year absence. On demand of Bernie Ecclestone, the chosen track became the Interlagos circuit, instead of the previously used Goiânia circuit.
- The French Grand Prix moved from the Paul Ricard circuit to the Magny-Cours circuit on demand of Bernie Ecclestone.
- The South African Grand Prix returned on the calendar after a six-year absence due to apartheid policies in the country. The venue used was the new, redesigned Kyalami circuit.
- The Vitesse du Mans Grand Prix was taken off the calendar.
- The European Grand Prix moved from the Jarama circuit to the newly built Catalunya circuit.
- The Malaysian Grand Prix was moved forward, from 29 September to 19 April.

== 1992 Grand Prix season results ==
=== Grands Prix ===
Round	Date	Race	Location	125cc winner	250cc winner	500cc winner	Report
1	29 March	(Japan) Japanese Grand Prix	Suzuka	(Germany) Ralf Waldmann	(Italy) Luca Cadalora	(Australia) Mick Doohan	Report
2	12 April	(Australia) Australian Grand Prix	Eastern Creek	(Germany) Ralf Waldmann	(Italy) Luca Cadalora	(Australia) Mick Doohan	Report
3	19 April	(Malaysia) Malaysian Grand Prix	Shah Alam	(Italy) Alessandro Gramigni	(Italy) Luca Cadalora	(Australia) Mick Doohan	Report
4	10 May	(Spain) Spanish Grand Prix	Jerez	(Germany) Ralf Waldmann	(Italy) Loris Reggiani	(Australia) Mick Doohan	Report
5	24 May	(Italy) Italian Grand Prix	Mugello	(Italy) Ezio Gianola	(Italy) Luca Cadalora	(United States) Kevin Schwantz	Report
6	31 May	(Europe) European Grand Prix	Catalunya	(Italy) Ezio Gianola	(Italy) Luca Cadalora	(United States) Wayne Rainey	Report
7	14 June	(Germany) German Grand Prix	Hockenheim	(Italy) Bruno Casanova	(Italy) Pierfrancesco Chili	(Australia) Mick Doohan	Report
8	27 June	(Netherlands) Dutch TT	Assen	(Italy) Ezio Gianola	(Italy) Pierfrancesco Chili	(Spain) Àlex Crivillé	Report
9	12 July	(Hungary) Hungarian Grand Prix	Hungaroring	(Italy) Alessandro Gramigni	(Italy) Luca Cadalora	(United States) Eddie Lawson	Report
10	19 July	(France) French Grand Prix	Magny-Cours	(Italy) Ezio Gianola	(Italy) Loris Reggiani	(United States) Wayne Rainey	Report
11	2 August	(United Kingdom) British Grand Prix	Donington	(Italy) Fausto Gresini	(Italy) Pierfrancesco Chili	(Australia) Wayne Gardner	Report
12	23 August	(Brazil) Brazilian Grand Prix	Interlagos	(Germany) Dirk Raudies	(Italy) Luca Cadalora	(United States) Wayne Rainey	Report
13	6 September	(South Africa) South African Grand Prix	Kyalami	(Spain) Jorge Martínez	(Italy) Max Biaggi	(United States) John Kocinski	Report

== Participants ==
=== 500cc participants ===
Team	Constructor	Motorcycle	No.	Rider	Rounds
(United States) Marlboro Team Roberts	Yamaha	Yamaha YZR500	1	(United States) Wayne Rainey	1–7, 9–13
(United States) Marlboro Team Roberts	Yamaha	Yamaha YZR500	4	(United States) John Kocinski	1–2, 4–13
(Japan) Rothmans Honda Team	Honda	Honda NSR500	2	(Australia) Mick Doohan	1–7, 12–13
(Japan) Rothmans Kanemoto Honda	Honda	Honda NSR500	5	(Australia) Wayne Gardner	1, 5, 7, 9–13
(Japan) Rothmans Kanemoto Honda	Honda	Honda NSR500	58	(Australia) Daryl Beattie	2–3
(Japan) Team HRC	Honda	Honda NSR500	53	(Japan) Shinichi Ito	1
(Japan) Team HRC	Honda	Honda NSR500	58	(Australia) Daryl Beattie	1
(Spain) Ducados Yamaha Team	Yamaha	Yamaha YZR500	6	(Spain) Juan Garriga	All
(Italy) Cagiva Team Agostini	Cagiva	Cagiva GP500 C592	7	(United States) Eddie Lawson	All
(Italy) Cagiva Team Agostini	Cagiva	Cagiva GP500 C592	12	(Brazil) Alex Barros	1–9, 12–13
(United States) Global Motorsports/Budweiser Racing	Yamaha	Yamaha YZR500	8	(United States) Randy Mamola	All
(Japan) Lucky Strike Suzuki 500	Suzuki	Suzuki RGV500	10	(United States) Doug Chandler	All
(Japan) Lucky Strike Suzuki 500	Suzuki	Suzuki RGV500	34	(United States) Kevin Schwantz	1–2, 4–13
(Japan) S.R.T.	Suzuki	Suzuki RGV500	55	(Japan) Keiji Ohishi	1
(United Kingdom) Millar Racing	Yamaha	Yamaha YZR500	11	(Republic of Ireland) Eddie Laycock	All
(France) Banco ROC	ROC-Yamaha	ROC GP1	14	(France) Dominique Sarron	2, 4–13
(Netherlands) HEK Racing Team	Harris-Yamaha	Harris SLS500	15	(Netherlands) Cees Doorakkers	2–13
(Italy) Librenti Corse	Librenti	Librenti 500	16	(Italy) Marco Papa	2–8, 10–13
Yamaha France/Banco	Yamaha	Yamaha YZR500	17	(Canada) Miguel Duhamel	All
Yamaha France/Banco	Yamaha	Yamaha YZR500	19	(United Kingdom) Niall Mackenzie	All
Yamaha France/Banco	Yamaha	Yamaha YZR500	65	(France) Bernard Garcia	10
(Germany) Rallye-Sport Racing Team	Harris-Yamaha	Harris SLS500	18	(Germany) Michael Rudroff	All
(United Kingdom) Team Valvoline/WCM	ROC-Yamaha	ROC GP1	21	(Australia) Peter Goddard	1–4, 6–7, 11–13
(United Kingdom) Team Valvoline/WCM	ROC-Yamaha	ROC GP1	40	(New Zealand) Andrew Stroud	9–10
(United Kingdom) Padgett's Racing Team	Harris-Yamaha	Harris SLS500	22	(United Kingdom) Simon Buckmaster	2–8, 12–13
(United Kingdom) Padgett's Racing Team	Harris-Yamaha	Harris SLS500	61	(United Kingdom) Jamie Whitham	11
(United Kingdom) Padgett's Racing Team	Harris-Yamaha	Harris SLS500	63	(United Kingdom) Terry Rymer	11
(Austria) Uvex Racing Team	ROC-Yamaha	ROC GP1	23	(Switzerland) Niggi Schmassmann	2–13
(Austria) Uvex Racing Team	ROC-Yamaha	ROC GP1	25	(Austria) Josef Doppler	2–13
(Italy) Paton	Paton	Paton V115 500	24	(Italy) Lucio Pedercini	2, 4–9, 11–12
(United Kingdom) MBM Racing	Harris-Yamaha	Harris SLS500	26	(United Kingdom) Kevin Mitchell	2–13
(United Kingdom) MBM Racing	Harris-Yamaha	Harris SLS500	62	(United Kingdom) Carl Fogarty	11
(Switzerland) Team ROC Swiss	ROC-Yamaha	ROC GP1	27	(Switzerland) Serge David	2–13
(Switzerland) Team ROC Swiss	ROC-Yamaha	ROC GP1	32	(Japan) Toshiyuki Arakaki	2–13
(Spain) Campsa Honda Team	Honda	Honda NSR500	28	(Spain) Àlex Crivillé	All
(Italy) VRP Racing Team	VRP	VRP 500 GP	29	(Luxembourg) Andreas Leuthe	4, 8–9, 11–13
(United Kingdom) Peter Graves Racing Team	Harris-Yamaha	Harris SLS500	30	(United Kingdom) Peter Graves	2–5, 7–13
(France) Ville de Paris	ROC-Yamaha	ROC GP1	31	(France) Thierry Criné	2–10
(France) Ville de Paris - Reims	ROC-Yamaha	ROC GP1	60	(South Africa) Mike Wilson	13
(France) Ville de Reims	ROC-Yamaha	ROC GP1	64	(France) Bruno Bonhuil	11
(Italy) K.C.S. International	ROC-Yamaha	ROC GP1	33	(Italy) Corrado Catalano	All
(Venezuela) Team Domina/SVES Racing	Harris-Yamaha	Harris SLS500	35	(Venezuela) Larry Moreno Vacondio	0 (5–6, 9–10)
(France) Arciero Racing Team	ROC-Yamaha	ROC GP1	36	(France) Claude Arciero	4, 6–10
(Spain) Nivea For Men Team	ROC-Yamaha	ROC GP1	37	(Spain) Juan López Mella	4–7, 12–13
(Japan) Kirin Mets RT Yamaha	Yamaha	Yamaha YZR500	52	(Japan) Norihiko Fujiwara	1
(Japan) An Team Blue Fox	Honda	Honda NSR500	54	(Japan) Keiichiro Iwahashi	1
(Japan) Hiro Racing Team Yamaha	Yamaha	Yamaha YZR500	56	(Japan) Toshihiko Honma	1
(Japan) AM/PM Racing	Honda	Honda NSR500	57	(Japan) Satoshi Tsujimoto	1
(South Africa) Grant Nashua	Harris-Yamaha	Harris SLS500	66	(South Africa) Russell Wood	13

r

Key
Regular Rider
Wildcard Rider
Replacement Rider

=== 250cc participants ===
Team	Constructor	Motorcycle	No.	Rider	Rounds
(Japan) Rothmans Kanemoto Honda	Honda	Honda NSR250	1	(Italy) Luca Cadalora	All
HB Honda Germany	Honda	Honda NSR250	2	(Germany) Helmut Bradl	All
HB Honda Germany	Honda	Honda NSR250	17	(Germany) Stefan Prein	All
(Spain) Repsol Honda/Cardús	Honda	Honda NSR250	3	(Spain) Carlos Cardús	1–6, 10–11
(Spain) Repsol Honda/Cardús	Honda	Honda NSR250	23	(Spain) Antonio Sanchez	8
(Japan) Lucky Strike Suzuki 250	Suzuki	Suzuki RGV250	4	(Netherlands) Wilco Zeelenberg	1–6, 8–13
(Japan) Lucky Strike Suzuki 250	Suzuki	Suzuki RGV250	28	(Spain) Herri Torrontegui	All
(Japan) Lucky Strike Suzuki 250	Suzuki	Suzuki RGV250	41	(Japan) Nobuyuki Wakai	7
(Japan) Hero Sports with M-Promotion Honda	Honda	Honda NSR250	5	(Japan) Masahiro Shimizu	All
(Japan) Marlboro Team Pileri	Honda	Honda NSR250	6	(Italy) Loris Capirossi	All
(Italy) Telkor Valesi Racing	Aprilia	Aprilia RSV 250	7	(Italy) Pierfrancesco Chili	All
(Italy) Telkor Valesi Racing	Aprilia	Aprilia RSV 250	29	(Italy) Max Biaggi	1–9, 11–13
(Japan) Mitsui Yamaha	Yamaha	Yamaha YZR 250	8	(Germany) Jochen Schmid	All
(Italy) Gilera Racing Team	Gilera	Aprilia RSV 250	9	(France) Jean-Philippe Ruggia	All
(Italy) Gilera Racing Team	Gilera	Aprilia RSV 250	14	(Venezuela) Carlos Lavado	All
(Italy) Gallina/Compagnucci	Yamaha	Yamaha YZR 250	10	(Italy) Paolo Casoli	All
(Italy) Gallina/Compagnucci	Yamaha	Yamaha YZR 250	27	(Italy) Stefano Caracchi	1–5
(Italy) Gallina/Compagnucci	Yamaha	Yamaha YZR 250	67	(Italy) Michele Gallina	6–13
(Austria) Team Preining	Aprilia	Aprilia RSV 250	11	(Austria) Andy Preining	All
(France) Euromoto Elf Honda	Honda	Honda NSR250	12	(France) Jean-Pierre Jeandat	1–8
(France) Euromoto Elf Honda	Honda	Honda NSR250	31	(France) Bernard Cazade	All
(France) Euromoto Elf Honda	Honda	Honda NSR250	38	(France) José Kuhn	9–13
(France) JPJ Team Motul	Aprilia	Aprilia RSV 250	12	(France) Jean-Pierre Jeandat	10
(Italy) Aprilia Unlimited Jeans	Aprilia	Aprilia RSV 250	13	(Italy) Loris Reggiani	All
HB Racing Team Italy	Honda	Honda NSR250	15	(Italy) Doriano Romboni	All
(Spain) Ducados DC Sports	Aprilia	Aprilia RSV 250	16	(Spain) Alberto Puig	All
(Netherlands) Exact Software-DC Sports	Aprilia	Aprilia RSV 250	36	(Netherlands) Patrick van den Goorbergh	All
(Germany) Aprilia-Marushin-Kuhnert	Aprilia	Aprilia RSV 250	18	(Germany) Harald Eckl	All
(Japan) Jha Racing	Honda	Honda NSR250	19	(Japan) Katsuyoshi Kozono	All
(Italy) Team Greco	Yamaha	Yamaha YZR 250	20	(Italy) Renzo Colleoni	1–5, 7–13
(Switzerland) Marlboro Aprilia Mohag	Aprilia	Aprilia RSV 250	21	(Switzerland) Bernard Häenggeli	All
(Switzerland) Marlboro Aprilia Mohag	Aprilia	Aprilia RSV 250	25	(Switzerland) Eskil Suter	All
(Germany) Adi Stadler Racing	Honda	Honda NSR250	24	(Germany) Adi Stadler	All
(Germany) Rallye Sport Team Munich	Aprilia	Aprilia RSV 250	26	(Germany) Bernd Kassner	All
(Switzerland) Honda Suisse Mühlebach	Honda	Honda NSR250	30	(Switzerland) Adrian Bosshard	All
(Switzerland) Melly Racing Team	Honda	Honda NSR250	32	(Switzerland) Yves Briguet	All
(Netherlands) Van den Goorbergh Racing	Aprilia	Aprilia RSV 250	33	(Netherlands) Jurgen van den Goorbergh	All
(Spain) Paquexpres / S.S.P. Competition	Honda	Honda NSR250	34	(Spain) Luis d'Antin	??
(Finland) KKN Racing	Aprilia	Aprilia RSV 250	35	(Finland) Erkka Korpiaho	1–11
(France) FP Moto Team	Aprilia	Aprilia RSV 250	37	(France) Frédéric Protat	All
(Japan) Team HRC	TSR-Honda	Honda NSR250	51	(Japan) Tadayuki Okada	1
(Japan) Nescafé Can RT Yamaha	Yamaha	Yamaha YZR 250	52	(Japan) Tetsuya Harada	1
(Japan) Cup Noodle Honda TS Kanto	Honda	Honda NSR250	53	(Japan) Nobuatsu Aoki	1
(Malaysia) Marlboro Yamaha Hong Leong	Yamaha	Yamaha YZR 250	59	(Malaysia) Kuan Meng Heng	3
(United States) Yamaha Team Rainey	Yamaha	Yamaha YZR 250	64	(Spain) Sete Gibernau	4

Key
Regular Rider
Wildcard Rider
Replacement Rider

=== 125cc participants ===
Team	Constructor	Motorcycle	No.	Rider	Rounds
Marlboro Team Pileri	Honda	Honda RS125R	2	(Italy) Fausto Gresini	1–10, 12–14
Marlboro Team Pileri	Honda	Honda RS125R	5	(Japan) Noboru Ueda	1–7, 9–13
Team Pileri	Honda	Honda RS125R	44	(Spain) Antonio Sánchez	8
Zwafink Racing	Honda	Honda RS125R	3	(Germany) Ralf Waldmann	All
Zwafink Racing	Honda	Honda RS125R	22	(Switzerland) Oliver Petrucciani	All
Semprucci IDM; Semprucci Pit Lane	Honda	Honda RS125R	4	(Italy) Gabriele Debbia	All
Semprucci IDM; Semprucci Pit Lane	Honda	Honda RS125R	16	(Italy) Ezio Gianola	All
Coronas Elf	Honda	Honda RS125R	6	(Spain) Jorge Martínez	All
Coronas Elf	Honda	Honda RS125R	11	(Switzerland) Heinz Lüthi	All
Coronas Aspar	Honda	Honda RS125R	64	(Spain) Juan Borja	8
Team Europa Raudies	Honda	Honda RS125R	8	(Germany) Dirk Raudies	1–7, 9–13
AGV Team Germany	Rotax	Rotax 125 GP	9	(Germany) Peter Öttl	1, 4–13
AGV Team Germany	Rotax	Rotax 125 GP	63	(Australia) Garry McCoy	2–3
Moto Bum Racing Supply	Honda	Honda RS125R	10	(Japan) Nobuyuki Wakai	All
F.C.C./T.S. Venus	Honda	Honda RS125R	13	(Japan) Kazuto Sakata	1–5, 7–13
Exact Software-DC Sports	Aprilia	Aprilia RS125R	14	(Netherlands) Hans Spaan	All
Exact Software-DC Sports	Aprilia	Aprilia RS125R	30	(Netherlands) Arie Molenaar	All
Scot Racing Team	Aprilia	Aprilia RS125R	15	(Italy) Bruno Casanova	All
Scot Racing Team	Aprilia	Aprilia RS125R	37	(Italy) Emilio Cuppini	1–5
Scot Racing Team	Aprilia	Aprilia RS125R	59	(Spain) Luis Alvaro	4, 6–13
Gazzaniga Corse	Gazzaniga	Gazzaniga 125	18	(Italy) Maurizio Vitali	1–5, 7–9, 11–13
Gazzaniga Corse	Gazzaniga	Gazzaniga 125	33	(Switzerland) Giovanni Palmieri	1–9, 11–13
Team Unemoto	Honda	Honda RS125R	19	(Japan) Hisashi Unemoto	1–10
Team Unemoto	Honda	Honda RS125R	41	(Finland) Johnny Wickström	11–13
Colin Appleyard Racing	Honda	Honda RS125R	20	(Japan) Kinya Wada	All
Colin Appleyard Racing	Honda	Honda RS125R	21	(United Kingdom) Robin Appleyard	All
Hernández Racing Team; Team Parra	Aprilia	Aprilia RS125R	23	(Spain) Manuel Hernández	All
Ditter Plastic-Stauch	Honda	Honda RS125R	24	(Germany) Oliver Koch	1–7, 9–10, 12–13
Ditter Plastic-Stauch	Honda	Honda RS125R	63	(Australia) Garry McCoy	8
Lazzarini - BYRD/Yamaha	Yamaha	Yamaha TZ125	25	(Italy) Giuseppe Fiorillo	1, 4–6, 8–11
Lazzarini - BYRD/Yamaha	Yamaha	Yamaha TZ125	26	(Italy) Gimmi Bosio	1
Lazzarini - BYRD/Yamaha	Yamaha	Yamaha TZ125	26	(Italy) Fausto Ricci	4-5, 8-11
Miralles Racing Team	Honda	Honda RS125R	27	(Spain) Julián Miralles	1–5, 7–13
Team+Co Promotion	Honda	Honda RS125R	28	(Germany) Alfred Waibel	All
Team+Co Promotion	Honda	Honda RS125R	29	(Germany) Hubert Abold	All
Team+Co Promotion	Honda	Honda RS125R	77	(Hungary) Attila Szabó	9
Carlos Giró Team	Aprilia	Aprilia RS125R	31	(Spain) Carlos Giró Jr	All
Elf Team Kepla	Honda	Honda RS125R	32	(Japan) Takao Shimizu	All
Promotop 41	Honda	Honda RS125R	34	(France) Alain Bronec	All
L B Racing Team	Honda	Honda RS125R	35	(Netherlands) Loek Bodelier	All
Clarke Racing Team	Honda	Honda RS125R	36	(United Kingdom) Steve Patrickson	All
Driza-Bone	Honda	Honda RS125R	38	(Australia) Peter Galvin	1–5, 7–13
Aprilia Unlimited Jeans	Aprilia	Aprilia RS125R	39	(Italy) Alessandro Gramigni	1–3, 5–13
Aprilia-Marushin-Kuhnert	Aprilia	Aprilia RS125R	40	(Germany) Maik Stief	1–8, 10–13
Tomumeito-Plot-Kohsaka	Honda	Honda RS125R	52	(Japan) Akira Saito	1
MBM Racing	Honda	Honda RS125R	69	(United Kingdom) Neil Hodgson	11
Team-JMC	Honda	Honda RS125R	75	(France) Régis Laconi	10
Honvéd Petőfi SE	Honda	Honda RS125R	76	(Hungary) Tibor Kis	9

Key
Regular Rider
Wildcard Rider
Replacement Rider

== Results and standings ==
=== 500cc riders' standings ===
Scoring system

Points are awarded to the top ten finishers. A rider has to finish the race to earn points.

Position	**1st**	**2nd**	**3rd**	**4th**	**5th**	**6th**	**7th**	**8th**	**9th**	**10th**
Points	20	15	12	10	8	6	4	3	2	1

Pos	Rider	Bike	JPN (Japan)	AUS (Australia)	MAL (Malaysia)	ESP (Spain)	ITA (Italy)	EUR (Europe)	GER (Germany)	NED (Netherlands)	HUN (Hungary)	FRA (France)	GBR (United Kingdom)	BRA (Brazil)	RSA (South Africa)	Pts
1	(United States) Wayne Rainey	Yamaha	Ret	2	2	2	Ret	1	Ret		5	1	2	1	3	140
2	(Australia) Mick Doohan	Honda	1	**1**	**1**	**1**	**2**	**2**	**1**					12	6	136
3	(United States) John Kocinski	Yamaha	Ret	DNQ		5	3	5	5	2	7	3	Ret	**2**	**1**	102
4	(United States) Kevin Schwantz	Suzuki	**3**	4		4	1	4	2	Ret	4	Ret	Ret	7	5	99
5	(United States) Doug Chandler	Suzuki	2	5	5	10	4	3	8	Ret	**2**	**Ret**	Ret	3	4	94
6	(Australia) Wayne Gardner	Honda	Ret				DNQ		3		6	2	1	4	2	78
7	(Spain) Juan Garriga	Yamaha	12	9	4	7	6	10	9	4	8	4	3	Ret	10	61
8	(Spain) Àlex Crivillé	Honda	Ret	7	3	Ret	8	Ret	4	1	DNS	Ret	Ret	6	7	59
9	(United States) Eddie Lawson	Cagiva	14	6	Ret	11	11	6	6	**Ret**	1	5	**4**	11	Ret	56
10	(United States) Randy Mamola	Yamaha	5	8	7	8	10	9	DNQ	5	3	8	Ret	10	Ret	45
11	(United Kingdom) Niall Mackenzie	Yamaha	7	Ret	Ret	3	9	7	Ret	7	14	6	Ret	9	8	37
12	(Canada) Miguel Duhamel	Yamaha	Ret	10	Ret	9	7	8	11	6	11	7	7	5	9	34
13	(Brazil) Alex Barros	Cagiva	11	12	Ret	12	5	11	7	3	9			8	Ret	29
14	(Australia) Daryl Beattie	Honda	DNS	3	6											18
15	(Australia) Peter Goddard	Yamaha	Ret	11	8	6		12	10				5	Ret	Ret	18
16	(Japan) Shinichi Ito	Honda	4													10
17	(Japan) Keiji Ohishi	Suzuki	6													6
18	(United Kingdom) Terry Rymer	Yamaha											6			6
19	(Italy) Corrado Catalano	Yamaha	16	14	9	20	12	Ret	Ret	8	Ret	Ret	Ret	Ret	12	5
20	(Republic of Ireland) Eddie Laycock	Yamaha	Ret	Ret	10	Ret	14	19	15	9	10	Ret	Ret	20	18	4
21	(Japan) Toshihiko Honma	Yamaha	8													3
22	(Germany) Michael Rudroff	Yamaha	15	18	14	16	16	18	14	11	16	14	8	15	19	3
23	(United Kingdom) Jamie Whitham	Yamaha										9	Ret			2
24	(France) Dominique Sarron	Yamaha		15		15	17	17	13	DNS	15	DNS	9	13	17	2
25	(Japan) Norihiko Fujiwara	Yamaha	9													2
26	(Japan) Toshi Arakaki	Yamaha		16	13	18	15	14	Ret	13	Ret	10	10	14	11	2
27	(United Kingdom) Kevin Mitchell	Yamaha		20	11	14	Ret	16	16	10	Ret	Ret	Ret	16	Ret	1
28	(Japan) Satoshi Tsujimoto	Honda	10													1
	(Switzerland) Serge David	Yamaha		19	15	21	Ret	20	Ret	16	20	12	11	18	20	0
	(New Zealand) Andrew Stroud	Yamaha									12	11				0
	(Netherlands) Cees Doorakkers	Yamaha		17	12	17	19	Ret	19	12	17	13	15	22	Ret	0
	(Spain) Juan Lopez Mella	Yamaha				19	18	15	12						13	0
	(France) Bruno Bonhuil	Yamaha											12			0
	(France) Thierry Crine	Yamaha		13	Ret	13	13	13	Ret	15	13					0
	(Switzerland) Nicholas Schmassmann	Yamaha		22	16	22	21	21	18	17	Ret	15	13	19	21	0
	(Japan) Keiichiro Iwahashi	Honda	13													0
	(United Kingdom) Peter Graves	Yamaha		Ret	Ret	Ret	22		21	19	18	16	14	23	22	0
	(United Kingdom) Damon Buckmaster	Yamaha		21	Ret	Ret	20	Ret	17	14				Ret	Ret	0
	(South Africa) Russel Wood	Yamaha													14	0
	(South Africa) Mike Wilson	Yamaha													15	0
	(Italy) Marco Papa	Librenti		Ret	Ret	24	Ret	22	Ret	18		18	16	17	16	0
	(Austria) Josef Doppler	Yamaha		Ret	Ret	23	Ret	24	20	21	21	17	Ret	Ret	24	0
	(Luxembourg) Andreas Leuthe	VRP				Ret				Ret	19		Ret	21	23	0
	(Italy) Lucio Pedercini	Paton		Ret		Ret	Ret	23	22	20	Ret		Ret	Ret		0
	(France) Claude Arciero	Yamaha				Ret		Ret	Ret	Ret	Ret	Ret				0
	(United Kingdom) Carl Fogarty	Yamaha											Ret			0
Pos	Rider	Bike	JPN (Japan)	AUS (Australia)	MAL (Malaysia)	ESP (Spain)	ITA (Italy)	EUR (Europe)	GER (Germany)	NED (Netherlands)	HUN (Hungary)	FRA (France)	GBR (United Kingdom)	BRA (Brazil)	RSA (South Africa)	Pts

Colour	Result
Gold	Winner
Silver	Second place
Bronze	Third place
Green	Points classification
Blue	Non-points classification
Blue	Non-classified finish (NC)
Purple	Retired, not classified (Ret)
Red	Did not qualify (DNQ)
Red	Did not pre-qualify (DNPQ)
Black	Disqualified (DSQ)
White	Did not start (DNS)
White	Withdrew (WD)
White	Race cancelled (C)
Blank	Did not practice (DNP)
Blank	Did not arrive (DNA)
Blank	Excluded (EX)

**Bold** – Pole Position

=== 250cc standings ===
Place	Rider	Number	Country	Team	Machine	Points	Wins
1	(Italy) Luca Cadalora	1	Italy	Rothmans-Honda	NSR250	203	7
2	(Italy) Loris Reggiani	13	Italy	Unlimited Jeans-Aprilia	RSV250	159	2
3	(Italy) Pierfrancesco Chili	7	Italy	Telkor Valesi-Aprilia	RSV250	119	3
4	(Germany) Helmut Bradl	2	Germany	HB-Honda Germany	NSR250	89	0
5	(Italy) Max Biaggi	29	Italy	Telkor Valesi-Aprilia	RSV250	78	1
6	(Spain) Alberto Puig	16	Spain	Ducados-Aprilia	RSV250	71	0
7	(Germany) Jochen Schmid	8	Germany	Mitsui-Yamaha	YZR250	58	0
8	(Spain) Carlos Cardús	3	Spain	Repsol-Honda	NSR250	48	0
9	(Japan) Masahiro Shimizu	5	Japan	Hero Sports-Honda	NSR250	46	0
10	(Italy) Doriano Romboni	15	Italy	HB-Honda Italy	NSR250	43	0
11	(Netherlands) Wilco Zeelenberg	4	Netherlands	Lucky Strike Suzuki 250		38	0
12	(Italy) Loris Capirossi	6	Italy	Marlboro Team Pileri	NSR250	27	0
13	(Japan) Tadayuki Okada	51	Japan	Team HRC	TSR-Honda	15	0
14	(Japan) Nobuatsu Aoki	53	Japan	Cup Noodle Honda	NSR250	12	0
15	(Spain) Herri Torrontegui	28	Spain	Lucky Strike Suzuki 250		11	0
16	(Austria) Andy Preining	11	Austria	Team Preining-Aprilia	RSV250	6	
17	Jean Philippe Ruggia					6	
18	Noboyuki Wakai					4	
19	Carlos Lavado					4	
20	Kyoji Nanba					3	
21	Paolo Casoli					3	
22	Bernard Haenggeli					2	
22	Stefan Prein					2	
22	Patrick van den Goorbergh					2	
25	Jurgen van de Goorbergh					2	
26	Bernd Kassner					1	
26	Jean Pierre Jeandat					1	

=== 125cc standings ===
Place	Rider	Number	Country	Machine	Points	Wins
1	(Italy) Alessandro Gramigni	7	Italy	Aprilia	134	2
2	(Italy) Fausto Gresini	2	Italy	Honda	118	1
3	(Germany) Ralf Waldmann	3	Germany	Honda	112	3
4	(Italy) Ezio Gianola	16	Italy	Honda	105	4
5	(Italy) Bruno Casanova	15	Italy	Aprilia	96	1
6	(Germany) Dirk Raudies	8	Germany	Honda	91	1
7	(Spain) Jorge Martínez	6	Spain	Honda	83	1
8	(Italy) Gabriele Debbia	4	Italy	Honda	58	0
9	(Japan) Noboru Ueda	5	Japan	Honda	57	0
10	(Japan) Nobuyuki Wakai	10	Japan	Honda	52	0
11	Kazuto Sakata				42	
12	Carlos Giro Jr.				39	
13	Hans Spaan				12	
14	Peter Oettl				10	
15	Oliver Petrucciani				9	
16	Oliver Koch				9	
17	Akira Saito				8	
18	Takao Shimizu				5	
19	Kinya Wada				5	
20	Yu Fujiwara				4	
21	Stefan Kurfiss				3	
22	Heinz Lüthi				1	
