= 1992 Hungarian motorcycle Grand Prix =

(Hungary) 1992 Hungarian Grand Prix
Race details
- Race 9 of 13 races in the 1992 Grand Prix motorcycle racing season
- Date: 12 July 1992
- Official name: HB Magyar Nagydíj
- Location: Hungaroring
- Course: Permanent racing facility; 3.968 km (2.466 mi)

500cc
Pole position
- Rider: (United States) Doug Chandler
- Time: 1:43.028
Fastest lap
- Rider: (Brazil) Alex Barros
- Time: 1:46.862
Podium
- First: (United States) Eddie Lawson
- Second: (United States) Doug Chandler
- Third: (United States) Randy Mamola

250cc
Pole position
- Rider: (Italy) Luca Cadalora
- Time: 1:44.069
Fastest lap
- Rider: (Italy) Pierfrancesco Chili
- Time: 1:44.995
Podium
- First: (Italy) Luca Cadalora
- Second: (Italy) Loris Reggiani
- Third: (Spain) Alberto Puig

125cc
Pole position
- Rider: (Italy) Alessandro Gramigni
- Time: 1:50.034
Fastest lap
- Rider: (Italy) Fausto Gresini
- Time: 1:50.150
Podium
- First: (Italy) Alessandro Gramigni
- Second: (Germany) Ralf Waldmann
- Third: (Italy) Fausto Gresini

The 1992 Hungarian motorcycle Grand Prix was the ninth round of the 1992 Grand Prix motorcycle racing season. It took place on the weekend of 10–12 July 1992 at the Hungaroring circuit.

== 500 cc race report ==
Wayne Rainey and Kevin Schwantz are back from injury, Schwantz with a thin cast that will allow him to ride. Yamaha introduced its YZR500 version of a "big bang" bike for Rainey. Rainey tried using the old engine with the new chassis, but the rear wheel spun too much and the power came on too abruptly.

Doug Chandler on pole; John Kocinski gets the start but rain brings out a red flag and a new race.

Wet restart goes to Eddie Lawson, then Schwantz and Rainey. Randy Mamola moves to the lead.

Order becomes: Mamola, Rainey, Chandler and Schwantz. Chandler passes Rainey.

Lawson started the race with cut slicks, and as conditions dry out, he moves quickly through the field, passing Schwantz in 4th place. Crivillé pits and switches bikes.

Lawson passes Rainey, then Mamola. Chandler still ahead. Many riders are pitting to change tires.

Lawson passes Chandler with 2 laps to go. It is Cagiva's first win in the premier class.

Schwantz: "To finish where I finished, actually in front of him, was almost a race win in itself for me. To have had Wayne as far out in front of me as he was early in the race, to reel him in and pass him and to leave with more points on him was great."

== 500 cc classification ==
Pos.	Rider	Team	Manufacturer	Time/Retired	Points
1	(United States) Eddie Lawson	Cagiva Team Agostini	Cagiva	58:21.786	20
2	(United States) Doug Chandler	Lucky Strike Suzuki	Suzuki	+14.194	15
3	(United States) Randy Mamola	Budweiser Team/Global Motorsports	Yamaha	+37.730	12
4	(United States) Kevin Schwantz	Lucky Strike Suzuki	Suzuki	+1:03.608	10
5	(United States) Wayne Rainey	Marlboro Team Roberts	Yamaha	+1:07.662	8
6	(Australia) Wayne Gardner	Rothmans Kanemoto Honda	Honda	+1:35.352	6
7	(United States) John Kocinski	Marlboro Team Roberts	Yamaha	+1:42.724	4
8	(Spain) Juan Garriga	Ducados Yamaha	Yamaha	+1:45.077	3
9	(Brazil) Alex Barros	Cagiva Team Agostini	Cagiva	+1 Lap	2
10	(Republic of Ireland) Eddie Laycock	Milla Racing	Yamaha	+1 Lap	1
11	(Canada) Miguel Duhamel	Yamaha Motor Banco	Yamaha	+1 Lap	
12	(New Zealand) Andrew Stroud	Valvoline Team WCM	ROC Yamaha	+1 Lap	
13	(France) Thierry Crine	Ville de Paris	ROC Yamaha	+1 Lap	
14	(United Kingdom) Niall Mackenzie	Yamaha Motor Banco	Yamaha	+2 Laps	
15	(France) Dominique Sarron	Team ROC Banco	ROC Yamaha	+2 Laps	
16	(Germany) Michael Rudroff	Rallye Sport	Harris Yamaha	+2 Laps	
17	(Netherlands) Cees Doorakkers	HEK Racing Team	Harris Yamaha	+3 Laps	
18	(United Kingdom) Peter Graves	Peter Graves Racing Team	Harris Yamaha	+3 Laps	
19	(Luxembourg) Andreas Leuthe	VRP Racing Team	VRP	+3 Laps	
20	(Switzerland) Serge David	Team ROC Banco	ROC Yamaha	+4 Laps	
21	(Austria) Josef Doppler	Uvex Racing Team	ROC Yamaha	+4 Laps	
Ret (22)	(Switzerland) Nicholas Schmassman	Uvex Racing Team	ROC Yamaha	Retirement	
Ret (23)	(France) Claude Arciero	Arciero Racing Team	ROC Yamaha	Retirement	
Ret (24)	(Japan) Toshiyuki Arakaki	Team ROC Banco	ROC Yamaha	Retirement	
Ret (25)	(United Kingdom) Kevin Mitchell	MBM Racing	Harris Yamaha	Retirement	
Ret (26)	(Italy) Lucio Pedercini	Paton Grand Prix	Paton	Retirement	
Ret (27)	(Italy) Corrado Catalano	KCS International	ROC Yamaha	Retirement	
DSQ (28)	(Spain) Àlex Crivillé	Campsa Honda Team	Honda	Disqualified	
DNS	(United Kingdom) Simon Buckmaster	Padgett's Motorcycles	Harris Yamaha	Did not start	
DNQ	(Venezuela) Larry Moreno Vacondio	Team Domina	Yamaha	Did not qualify	

Previous race: 1992 Dutch TT	FIM Grand Prix World Championship; 1992 season	Next race: 1992 French Grand Prix
Previous race: 1990 Hungarian Grand Prix	Hungarian Grand Prix	Next race: 2025 Hungarian Grand Prix
