= Peter Graves (motorcyclist) =

British motorcycle racer

Peter Allan Graves (born 6 June 1966), is a British former professional Grand Prix motorcycle road racer.

== Early life ==
Graves was born in Hampstead, London, UK. He attended Hampton School before starting a racing career which spanned the years from 1984 to 1999.

== Career ==
Graves raced in series including the Grand Prix world championship in 1992 riding a Harris-Yamaha. He competed in the 1994 Endurance World Championship for team Phase One Endurance at Spa-Francorchamps, and for several years the British Superbike Championship. He was winner of a number of British Championship events.

== Team manager ==
In the 1993 as well as racing a Ducati 888 in British Superbike, Graves fielded a team in the Grand Prix for riders Simon Crafar and David Jefferies.

== Leukaemia ==
In July 1997, Graves was diagnosed with leukemia and sat out the remainder of the racing season while undergoing Chemotherapy at Cheltenham General Hospital and Hammersmith Hospital. In 1998, he returned to the British Superbike Championship and won the 'Privateers Cup' on his first race back at Brands Hatch.

== Grand Prix career statistics ==
Points system in 1992:

| **Position** | 1 | 2 | 3 | 4 | 5 | 6 | 7 | 8 | 9 | 10 |
| **Points** | 20 | 15 | 12 | 10 | 8 | 6 | 4 | 3 | 2 | 1 |

(key) (Races in bold indicate pole position; races in italics indicate fastest lap)

| Year | Class | Team | Machine | 1 | 2 | 3 | 4 | 5 | 6 | 7 | 8 | 9 | 10 | 11 | 12 | 13 | 14 | 15 | Points | Rank | Wins |
|---|---|---|---|---|---|---|---|---|---|---|---|---|---|---|---|---|---|---|---|---|---|
| 1989 | 500cc | Honda | RS500 | JPN - | AUS - | USA - | ESP - | NAT - | GER - | AUT - | YUG - | NED - | BEL - | FRA - | GBR; 23 | SWE - | CZE - | BRA - | 0 | - | 0 |
| 1992 | 500cc | Peter Graves Racing-Yamaha | Harris-YZR500 | JPN - | AUS - | MAL - | ESP - | ITA; 22 | EUR - | GER; 21 | NED; 19 | HUN; 18 | FR; 16 | GBR; 14 | BRA; 23 | SA; 22 | | | 0 | - | 0 |
