= 1992 European motorcycle Grand Prix =

(Europe) 1992 European Grand Prix
Race details
- Race 6 of 13 races in the 1992 Grand Prix motorcycle racing season
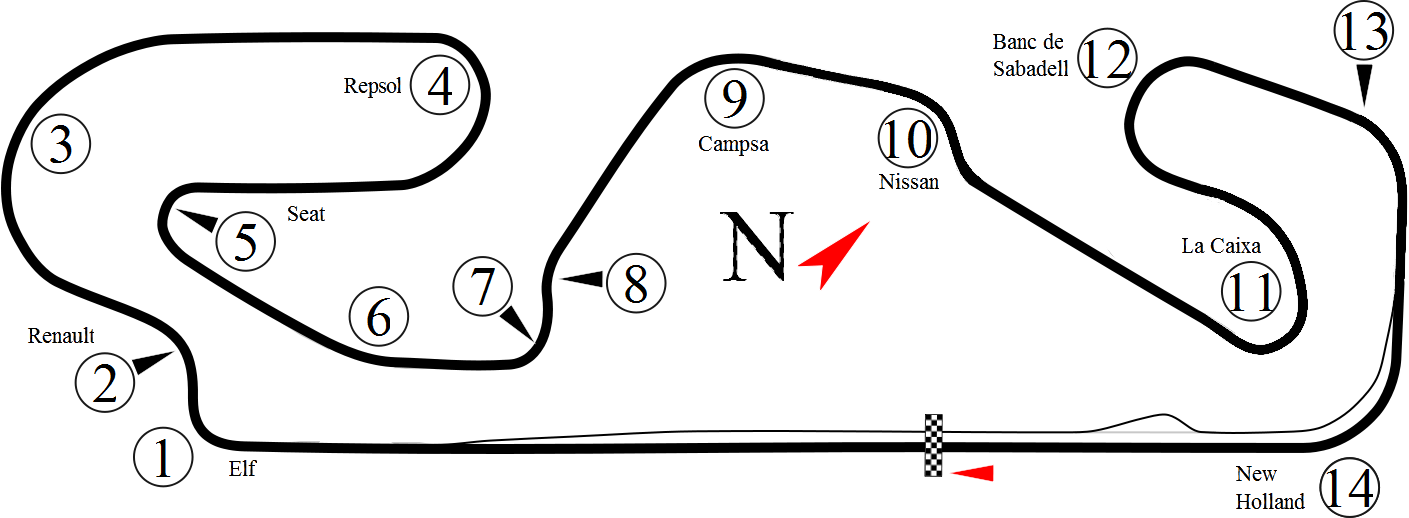
- Date: 31 May 1992
- Official name: Gran Premio Super Nintendo Entertainment System de Europa
- Location: Circuit de Catalunya
- Course: Permanent racing facility; 4.655 km (2.892 mi)

500cc
Pole position
- Rider: (Australia) Mick Doohan
- Time: 1:48.549
Fastest lap
- Rider: (Australia) Mick Doohan
- Time: 1:48.583
Podium
- First: (United States) Wayne Rainey
- Second: (Australia) Mick Doohan
- Third: (United States) Doug Chandler

250cc
Pole position
- Rider: (Italy) Max Biaggi
- Time: 1:50.819
Fastest lap
- Rider: (Italy) Loris Reggiani
- Time: 1:51.304
Podium
- First: (Italy) Luca Cadalora
- Second: (Italy) Loris Reggiani
- Third: (Italy) Max Biaggi

125cc
Pole position
- Rider: (Italy) Ezio Gianola
- Time: 1:58.091
Fastest lap
- Rider: (Spain) Carlos Giró
- Time: 1:57.836
Podium
- First: (Italy) Ezio Gianola
- Second: (Italy) Gabriele Debbia
- Third: (Italy) Fausto Gresini

The 1992 European motorcycle Grand Prix was the sixth round of the 1992 Grand Prix motorcycle racing season. It took place on the weekend of 29–31 May 1992 at the Montmelò circuit.

== 500 cc race report ==
Mick Doohan was on pole. At the start John Kocinski briefly got the lead however Eddie Lawson beat him to the first turn. Lawson, Doohan and Wayne Rainey were at the front. Doohan got past Lawson, as did Rainey. With 2 laps to go, Rainey got past Doohan. Doohan tried to repass, but Rainey denied him any opportunities.

== 500 cc classification ==
Pos.	Rider	Team	Manufacturer	Time/Retired	Points
1	(United States) Wayne Rainey	Marlboro Team Roberts	Yamaha	47:31.348	20
2	(Australia) Mick Doohan	Rothmans Honda Team	Honda	+0.057	15
3	(United States) Doug Chandler	Lucky Strike Suzuki	Suzuki	+14.762	12
4	(United States) Kevin Schwantz	Lucky Strike Suzuki	Suzuki	+16.333	10
5	(United States) John Kocinski	Marlboro Team Roberts	Yamaha	+28.147	8
6	(United States) Eddie Lawson	Cagiva Team Agostini	Cagiva	+35.574	6
7	(United Kingdom) Niall Mackenzie	Yamaha Motor Banco	Yamaha	+42.813	4
8	(Canada) Miguel Duhamel	Yamaha Motor Banco	Yamaha	+43.805	3
9	(United States) Randy Mamola	Budweiser Team/Global Motorsports	Yamaha	+44.152	2
10	(Spain) Juan Garriga	Ducados Yamaha	Yamaha	+49.388	1
11	(Brazil) Alex Barros	Cagiva Team Agostini	Cagiva	+1:11.219	
12	(Australia) Peter Goddard	Valvoline Team WCM	ROC Yamaha	+1:11.301	
13	(France) Thierry Crine	Ville de Paris	ROC Yamaha	+1:28.596	
14	(Japan) Toshiyuki Arakaki	Team ROC Banco	ROC Yamaha	+1:28.645	
15	(Spain) Juan Lopez Mella	Nivea For Men Team	ROC Yamaha	+1:40.342	
16	(United Kingdom) Kevin Mitchell	MBM Racing	Harris Yamaha	+1:41.817	
17	(France) Dominique Sarron	Team ROC Banco	ROC Yamaha	+1 Lap	
18	(Germany) Michael Rudroff	Rallye Sport	Harris Yamaha	+1 Lap	
19	(Republic of Ireland) Eddie Laycock	Milla Racing	Yamaha	+1 Lap	
20	(Switzerland) Serge David	Team ROC Banco	ROC Yamaha	+1 Lap	
21	(Switzerland) Nicholas Schmassman	Uvex Racing Team	ROC Yamaha	+1 Lap	
22	(Italy) Marco Papa	Librenti Corse	Librenti	+1 Lap	
23	(Italy) Lucio Pedercini	Paton Grand Prix	Paton	+2 Laps	
24	(Austria) Josef Doppler	Uvex Racing Team	ROC Yamaha	+2 Laps	
Ret (25)	(United Kingdom) Damon Buckmaster	Padgett's Motorcycles	Harris Yamaha	Retirement	
Ret (26)	(Netherlands) Cees Doorakkers	HEK Racing Team	Harris Yamaha	Retirement	
Ret (27)	(Spain) Àlex Crivillé	Campsa Honda Team	Honda	Retirement	
Ret (28)	(Italy) Corrado Catalano	KCS International	ROC Yamaha	Retirement	
Ret (29)	(France) Claude Arciero	Arciero Racing Team	ROC Yamaha	Retirement	
DNQ	(Luxembourg) Andreas Leuthe	VRP Racing Team	VRP	Did not qualify	
DNQ	(Venezuela) Larry Moreno Vacondio	Team Domina	Yamaha	Did not qualify	

Previous race: 1992 Italian Grand Prix	FIM Grand Prix World Championship; 1992 season	Next race: 1992 German Grand Prix
Previous race: 1991 European Grand Prix	European Grand Prix	Next race: 1993 European Grand Prix
