= 1992 Spanish motorcycle Grand Prix =

(Spain) 1992 Spanish Grand Prix
Race details
- Race 4 of 13 races in the 1992 Grand Prix motorcycle racing season
- Date: 10 May 1992
- Official name: Gran Premio Ducados de España
- Location: Circuito de Jerez
- Course: Permanent racing facility; 4.428 km (2.751 mi)

500cc
Pole position
- Rider: (Australia) Mick Doohan
- Time: 1:45.480
Fastest lap
- Rider: (Australia) Mick Doohan
- Time: 1:45.356
Podium
- First: (Australia) Mick Doohan
- Second: (United States) Wayne Rainey
- Third: (United Kingdom) Niall Mackenzie

250cc
Pole position
- Rider: (Italy) Luca Cadalora
- Time: 1:47.725
Fastest lap
- Rider: (Italy) Loris Reggiani
- Time: 1:48.283
Podium
- First: (Italy) Loris Reggiani
- Second: (Germany) Helmut Bradl
- Third: (Japan) Masahiro Shimizu

125cc
Pole position
- Rider: (Japan) Kazuto Sakata
- Time: 1:53.790
Fastest lap
- Rider: (Italy) Gabriele Debbia
- Time: 1:53.509
Podium
- First: (Germany) Ralf Waldmann
- Second: (Italy) Fausto Gresini
- Third: (Spain) Carlos Giró

The 1992 Spanish motorcycle Grand Prix was the fourth round of the 1992 Grand Prix motorcycle racing season. It took place on the weekend of 8–10 May 1992 at the Jerez circuit.

== 500 cc race report ==
Mick Doohan was on pole, and got the lead at the start from Wayne Rainey and Kevin Schwantz. Doohan then opened a gap to Rainey, who in turn had a gap to a fight for 3rd between Schwantz and Àlex Crivillé. Crivillé retired and Niall Mackenzie went up to 3rd. Doohan won the race for his 4th win in a row.

== 500 cc classification ==
Pos.	Rider	Team	Manufacturer	Time/Retired	Points
1	(Australia) Mick Doohan	Rothmans Honda Team	Honda	+49:42.940	20
2	(United States) Wayne Rainey	Marlboro Team Roberts	Yamaha	+18.991	15
3	(United Kingdom) Niall Mackenzie	Yamaha Motor Banco	Yamaha	+28.373	12
4	(United States) Kevin Schwantz	Lucky Strike Suzuki	Suzuki	+28.481	10
5	(United States) John Kocinski	Marlboro Team Roberts	Yamaha	+39.357	8
6	(Australia) Peter Goddard	Valvoline Team WCM	ROC Yamaha	+48.801	6
7	(Spain) Juan Garriga	Ducados Yamaha	Yamaha	+52.482	4
8	(United States) Randy Mamola	Budweiser Team/Global Motorsports	Yamaha	+53.688	3
9	(Canada) Miguel Duhamel	Yamaha Motor Banco	Yamaha	+53.932	2
10	(United States) Doug Chandler	Lucky Strike Suzuki	Suzuki	+58.792	1
11	(United States) Eddie Lawson	Cagiva Team Agostini	Cagiva	+1:03.477	
12	(Brazil) Alex Barros	Cagiva Team Agostini	Cagiva	+1:21.460	
13	(France) Thierry Crine	Ville de Paris	ROC Yamaha	+1:46.825	
14	(United Kingdom) Kevin Mitchell	MBM Racing	Harris Yamaha	+1 Lap	
15	(France) Dominique Sarron	Team ROC Banco	ROC Yamaha	+1 Lap	
16	(Germany) Michael Rudroff	Rallye Sport	Harris Yamaha	+1 Lap	
17	(Netherlands) Cees Doorakkers	HEK Racing Team	Harris Yamaha	+1 Lap	
18	(Japan) Toshiyuki Arakaki	Team ROC Banco	ROC Yamaha	+1 Lap	
19	(Spain) Juan Lopez Mella	Nivea For Men Team	ROC Yamaha	+1 Lap	
20	(Italy) Corrado Catalano	KCS International	ROC Yamaha	+1 Lap	
21	(Switzerland) Serge David	Team ROC Banco	ROC Yamaha	+1 Lap	
22	(Switzerland) Nicholas Schmassman	Uvex Racing Team	ROC Yamaha	+1 Lap	
23	(Austria) Josef Doppler	Uvex Racing Team	ROC Yamaha	+1 Lap	
24	(Italy) Marco Papa	Librenti Corse	Librenti	+3 Laps	
Ret (25)	(United Kingdom) Peter Graves	Peter Graves Racing Team	Harris Yamaha	Retirement	
Ret (26)	(Luxembourg) Andreas Leuthe	VRP Racing Team	VRP	Retirement	
Ret (27)	(United Kingdom) Damon Buckmaster	Padgett's Motorcycles	Harris Yamaha	Retirement	
Ret (28)	(France) Claude Arciero	Arciero Racing Team	ROC Yamaha	Retirement	
Ret (29)	(Italy) Lucio Pedercini	Paton Grand Prix	Paton	Retirement	
Ret (30)	(Republic of Ireland) Eddie Laycock	Milla Racing	Yamaha	Retirement	
Ret (31)	(Spain) Àlex Crivillé	Campsa Honda Team	Honda	Retirement	

Previous race: 1992 Malaysian Grand Prix	FIM Grand Prix World Championship; 1992 season	Next race: 1992 Italian Grand Prix
Previous race: 1991 Spanish Grand Prix	Spanish Grand Prix	Next race: 1993 Spanish Grand Prix
