= 1992 Dutch TT =

(Netherlands) 1992 Dutch Grand Prix
Race details
- Race 8 of 13 races in the 1992 Grand Prix motorcycle racing season
- Date: 27 June 1992
- Official name: Dutch TT Assen
- Location: TT Circuit Assen
- Course: Permanent racing facility; 6.049 km (3.759 mi)

500cc
Pole position
- Rider: (United States) Eddie Lawson
- Time: 2:03.675
Fastest lap
- Rider: (Spain) Juan Garriga
- Time: 2:04.625
Podium
- First: (Spain) Àlex Crivillé
- Second: (United States) John Kocinski
- Third: (Brazil) Alex Barros

250cc
Pole position
- Rider: (Italy) Max Biaggi
- Time: 2:06.736
Fastest lap
- Rider: (Italy) Pierfrancesco Chili
- Time: 2:07.831
Podium
- First: (Italy) Pierfrancesco Chili
- Second: (Italy) Luca Cadalora
- Third: (Italy) Loris Reggiani

125cc
Pole position
- Rider: (Italy) Ezio Gianola
- Time: 2:17.175
Fastest lap
- Rider: (Italy) Gabriele Debbia
- Time: 2:16.851
Podium
- First: (Italy) Ezio Gianola
- Second: (Italy) Fausto Gresini
- Third: (Italy) Alessandro Gramigni

The 1992 Dutch TT was the eighth round of the 1992 Grand Prix motorcycle racing season. It took place on the weekend of 25–27 June 1992 at the TT Circuit Assen located in Assen, Netherlands.

== 500cc race report ==
Wayne Rainey couldn't complete practice because of his injured wrist and ankle, and team manager Kenny Roberts wouldn't let him ride with pain medication, so Rainey left Assen.

Mick Doohan crashed during the first qualifying, and suffered a double-fracture of the right leg; complications from the injury would keep him from racing until Brazil. Wayne Gardner also crashed and suffered a concussion. Randy Mamola, Kevin Schwantz and Niall Mackenzie all crashed pre-race but all took the start.

Eddie Lawson had been setting fast lap times, and was favoured to win.

As the light went out, Schwantz managed to jump the rest to catapult himself into the lead, followed by Lawson and Alex Barros; John Kocinski was down the field with a bad start.

As the pack got away, the top four is as follows on lap one: Schwantz, Lawson, Barros and Chandler. Miguel Duhamel was a relatively distant fifth, with Àlex Crivillé closing up to him. No overtakes were made, though Lawson tried to pass Schwantz a few times.

On lap two, Chandler dived to the inside of Barros' Cagiva and overtook him for third at the Built corner. Crivillé and Juan Garriga have overtaken Duhamel for fifth and sixth, with the gap now being significant to the top four.

Lap three and Barros has overtaken Chandler on the outside at the Haarbocht, bringing him back up to third position. Chandler then disappeared from the frontrunners between the Ossenbroeken and Strubben cornercomplex.

With Chandler out of contention by lap three, Garriga moved up to fourth, Crivillé to fifth and Duhamel to sixth place at the start of lap four. The top three has not changed by the start of the lap, it being Schwantz, Lawson and Barros. Coming up to the Veenslang and Ruskenhoek corners, Lawson tried to pass Schwantz but failed, with the Suzuki rider answering accordingly and maintaining his lead. Kocinski has also overtaken Duhamel for sixth, but the cameras did not pick up on it.

Lap five and no overtakes took place at the front. Lawson once again tried to pass at some sections but Schwantz stayed ahead. The top six did not change either.

On lap six, Lawson is still trying to find a way past Schwantz. He closes up at the Veenslang but just misses the power to get past. He tries once more at the entrance of the Geert Timmer Bocht via the outside, with Schwantz covering his line.

Then, on lap seven, Lawson finally makes the move. He tried to pass Schwantz on the straight but couldn't clear the Suzuki, so Lawson stayed on the inside and attempted a block pass going into the Haarbocht. However, Schwantz was committed on a wide line and refused to back down. Schwantz came across the front of Lawson and Lawson touched Schwantz' rear tyre, just enough to make it hop and bring the Suzuki down. Schwantz' bike fell in front of Lawson and he couldn't avoid hitting it, making them both crash out of the race as a result. The pair rolled onto the grass at a high speed, with Schwantz coming to a standstill when he heavily hit a stack of reinforced bales and Lawson when he tumbled hard into a ditch. Lawson was able to walk away unhurt, but Schwantz had to be carried off with a broken arm via a stretcher by the trackside medical personnel, being in visible pain as they do so. This now meant that the other Cagiva of barros was leading the race.

Lap eight and Garriga and Crivillé are slowly reeling in a fading Barros. Kocinski meanwhile still is stuck in a fourth place. Randy Mamola is a very distant fifth, as is Duhamel in sixth.

During the entirety of lap nine, Garriga and Crivillé closed in on Barros. Crivillé tried to overtake Garriga at the Built, but decided to stay behind Garriga and follow him for now.

By lap ten, Garriga and Crivillé have now fully caught the leader. It seemed like he was pulling away again when the trio entered the banked Strubben corner, but Garriga made his move at the Ruskenhoek, going into the Stekkenwal. However, he failed to pull it off, losing momentum as he went into the corner. This gave Crivillé a good opportunity to overtake him on the outside of the unnamed right hand kink going into the Built corner, where he finalised the move by passing him as this corner is left handed, giving Crivillé the inside line.

On lap eleven, Crivillé set the pace and chased after Barros. Kocinski was also slowly making his way back up to the leading trio. Crivillé finally made the move on the Brazilian at the Stekkenwal, forcing Barros wide and almost making him lose second to Garriga. This allowed Kocinski to make up even more ground and slowly get into the slipstream of Garriga. However, Barros fought back and retook the lead when he dived down the inside of Crivillé at the opening of the Geert Timmer Bocht, with Kocinski losing the bike as he exited the corner for a moment.

Lap twelve and Crivillé has not given up. He tries to repeat the same move as the last lap at the same corner - the Stekkenwal - but fails and sticks behind Barros for now. Kocinski is also all over the rear of Garriga by now.

As lap thirteen begins, Crivillé lost some ground to Barros when he made a slight mistake coming out of the Geert Timmer Bocht at the end of the last lap, causing him to lose speed. Garriga made his move at the entrance of the Haarbocht, driving side-by-side with Crivillé but forcing the Campsa Honda rider wide and snatching back second place as a result. However, when Garriga arrived at the Madijk corner, he took a line that was too wide, undoing all the hard work as he lost both second to Crivillé and third to Kocinski. Kocinski - who had caught up to the duo by now - passed Crivillé exiting the Ramshoek and went side-by-side with him at the Geert Timmer Bocht. He tried to hold it around the outside, but Kocinski outsmarted him by braking later, passing him as they exit the corner. Garriaga is now slowly coming back into the fight also.

Lap fourteen and Crivillé passes Kocinski for second at the second part of the start/finish straight, finalising the move at the entrance of the Haarbocht. This fighting allowed Barros to open up a slight gap, but halfway into the lap both riders already closed it. However, when Barros entered the Ruskenhoek, he made a slight mistake and went wide, possibly due to tyre troubles, gifting the lead to Crivillé, second to Kocinski and third to Garriga. Barros himself dropped back to fourth position. Kocinski then makes the move again at the entrance of the Geert Timmer Bocht and passes Crivillé for the lead of the race.

On lap fifteen, Crivillé shadowed Kocinski and made good use of the power of his Honda to overtake the Marlboro Yamaha rider at the fast Ruskenhoek section. Barros had also caught up to the pack. He then surprised Garriaga by diving on the inside at the Geert Timmer Bocht to pass him for third position.

Lap sixteen and Barros tries to make up lost ground. He tries to line up a pass at the Witterdiep kink and wants to dive down the inside of Kocinski at the Madijk corner, but backs down and stays behind him for now. Barros lines up another attempt at the Ramshoek and manages to pass Kocinski for second at the Geert Timmer Bocht.

As lap seventeen begins, the top six is as follows: Crivillé, Barros, Kocinski, Garriga, Mamola and Niall Mackenzie, who had overtaken Duhamel for the sixth spot. Barros lines up yet another pass going into the Geert Timmer Bocht - this time for the lead - but Crivillé refuses to let him by and bravely holds on to stay ahead, just making the corner.

As Crivillé starts lap eighteen, he has a big moment going out of the S-Bocht, but does not lose any positions because of it. In between the Ossebroeken and Strubben section, Barros managed to pass Crivillé for the lead. Kocinski tries to retake second going into the Ruskenhoek, but Crivillé holds on and denies him the position by the time they enter the Stekkenwal.

The penultimate lap - lap nineteen - begins and Garriga has lost ground with the three frontrunners. Coming out of the Ossebroeken, Barros tried to go side-by-side with Crivillé but ended up having a little twitch, causing him to lose a bit of speed. At the Strubben turn, he ran slightly wide, allowing Kocinski to pass underneath him and snatch second position from him. Kocinski tries to pass Crivillé also at the Geert Timmer Bocht, but he holds out as they exit the corner.

Lap twenty - the final lap - has started with Barros trying to make a move on Kocinski at the little straight before the Haarbocht. He covers him off and Barros tries the outside, continuing to harass the Yamaha rider at the Witterdiep kink, but fails and tucks in behind him. Barros then makes a move at the unnamed right hand corner before Strubben and is back up to second, with Kocinski going slightly wide at the banked corner, allowing Barros some breathing room. This fighting allows Crivillé to build up a small gap to the two. It looked like Barros had secured second place, but coming out of Duikersloot he had a big moment, allowing Kocinski to catch right up to him, passing him at the Meeuwenmeer in the process. All this was enough for Crivillé to build up big enough of a gap and cross the line to win his first ever 500cc race in his premier-class rookie season. Kocinski blocked off a final attack of Barros at the middle of the Geert Timmer Bocht and finished second, with Barros right behind him in third. Crivillé's win was the first ever for a Spaniard in the 500cc class. Garriga crossed the line in a relatively distant fourth. Mamola finished fifth and Duhamel also took back sixth place from Mackenzie.

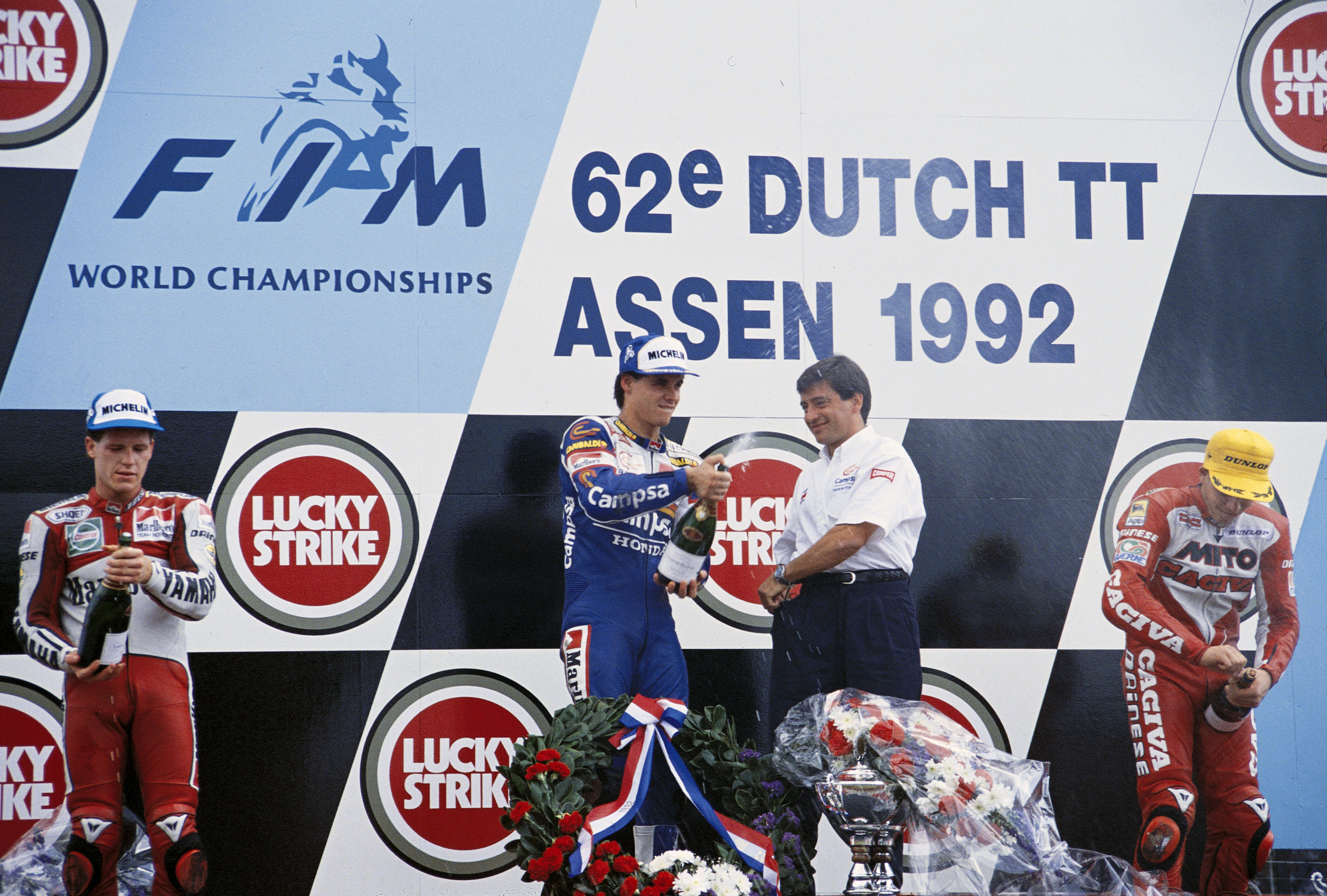
John Kocinski, Àlex Crivillé and Alex Barros, spraying the champagne after finishing second, first and third at the 500cc race.

During the parade lap back to parc-fermé, Crivillé waved to the crowd and did a wheelie to celebrate. Spanish fans also sneaked under the fence and waved around with flags to congratulate him.

The flowers and trophies are all given out by the present important figures. Crivillé raises his in delight, as does Barros. The Spanish national anthem plays and then Crivillé sprays the champagne on the top step of the podium.

Schwantz' comment on the accident: "As far as the accident goes, I say it's his fault, he says it's my fault. We'll argue about that until both of our racing days and probably our days in general are over, it'll be an argument between Eddie and myself. It is the same with everybody, if you look at it biased one way or the other, that is the way you are going to see it. I was in front, that's my only argument, I didn't know where he was. I sure as hell didn't know he was coming up the inside."

== 500 cc classification ==
Pos.	Rider	Team	Manufacturer	Time/Retired	Points
1	(Spain) Àlex Crivillé	Campsa Honda Team	Honda	42:00.424	20
2	(United States) John Kocinski	Marlboro Team Roberts	Yamaha	+0.762	15
3	(Brazil) Alex Barros	Cagiva Team Agostini	Cagiva	+0.793	12
4	(Spain) Juan Garriga	Ducados Yamaha	Yamaha	+2.254	10
5	(United States) Randy Mamola	Budweiser Team/Global Motorsports	Yamaha	+34.006	8
6	(Canada) Miguel Duhamel	Yamaha Motor Banco	Yamaha	+39.944	6
7	(United Kingdom) Niall Mackenzie	Yamaha Motor Banco	Yamaha	+40.415	4
8	(Italy) Corrado Catalano	KCS International	ROC Yamaha	+43.589	3
9	(Republic of Ireland) Eddie Laycock	Milla Racing	Yamaha	+44.048	2
10	(United Kingdom) Kevin Mitchell	MBM Racing	Harris Yamaha	+1:00.115	1
11	(Germany) Michael Rudroff	Rallye Sport	Harris Yamaha	+1:21.785	
12	(Netherlands) Cees Doorakkers	HEK Racing Team	Harris Yamaha	+1:27.838	
13	(Japan) Toshiyuki Arakaki	Team ROC Banco	ROC Yamaha	+1:33.764	
14	(United Kingdom) Damon Buckmaster	Padgett's Motorcycles	Harris Yamaha	+1:34.999	
15	(France) Thierry Crine	Ville de Paris	ROC Yamaha	+1:34.265	
16	(Switzerland) Serge David	Team ROC Banco	ROC Yamaha	+1:57.647	
17	(Switzerland) Nicholas Schmassman	Uvex Racing Team	ROC Yamaha	+2:03.953	
18	(Italy) Marco Papa	Librenti Corse	Librenti	+2:17.150	
19	(United Kingdom) Peter Graves	Peter Graves Racing Team	Harris Yamaha	+1 Lap	
20	(Italy) Lucio Pedercini	Paton Grand Prix	Paton	+1 Lap	
21	(Austria) Josef Doppler	Uvex Racing Team	ROC Yamaha	+5 Laps	
Ret (22)	(France) Claude Arciero	Arciero Racing Team	ROC Yamaha	Retirement	
Ret (23)	(United States) Kevin Schwantz	Lucky Strike Suzuki	Suzuki	Retirement	
Ret (24)	(United States) Eddie Lawson	Cagiva Team Agostini	Cagiva	Retirement	
Ret (25)	(France) Dominique Sarron	Team ROC Banco	ROC Yamaha	Retirement	
Ret (26)	(United States) Doug Chandler	Lucky Strike Suzuki	Suzuki	Retirement	
Ret (27)	(Luxembourg) Andreas Leuthe	VRP Racing Team	VRP	Retirement	
DNS	(Australia) Mick Doohan	Rothmans Honda Team	Honda	Did not start	
DNS	(Australia) Peter Goddard	Valvoline Team WCM	ROC Yamaha	Did not start	
DNS	(Spain) Juan Lopez Mella	Nivea For Men Team	ROC Yamaha	Did not start	
DNS	(Australia) Wayne Gardner	Rothmans Kanemoto Honda	Honda	Did not start	

Previous race: 1992 German Grand Prix	FIM Grand Prix World Championship; 1992 season	Next race: 1992 Hungarian Grand Prix
Previous race: 1991 Dutch TT	Dutch TT	Next race: 1993 Dutch TT
