= Miguel Duhamel =

Canadian motorcycle racer (born 1967)

- Nationality: (Canada) Canadian
Motorcycle racing career statistics
Grand Prix motorcycle racing
Active years	1992, 2007
First race	1992 500cc Japanese Grand Prix
Last race	2007 MotoGP United States Grand Prix
First win	None
Last win	None
Team	Honda, Suzuki
Championships	0
Starts / Wins / Podiums / Poles / F. laps / Points; 14 / 0 / 0 / 0 / 0 / 31

Miguel Duhamel (born May 26, 1967) is a Canadian former professional motorcycle racer. He is the son of Canadian Motorsport Hall of Fame member Yvon Duhamel. He is tied with Toni Elias for the fourth-winningest rider in the AMA Superbike series with 32 wins (Mat Mladin is #1 with 82, Josh Hayes is #2 with 61, and Cameron Beaubier is #3 with 38). Duhamel was inducted into the AMA Motorcycle Hall of Fame in 2016 as well as the Motorsports Hall of Fame of America in 2025.

== Racing career ==
Born in LaSalle, Quebec, Duhamel began his professional racing career in 1988. He raced for Honda in the FIM Endurance Cup and for Team Suzuki in the Canadian Superbike Championship. He also rode a limited AMA 250 Grand Prix schedule. Duhamel won his first AMA Superbike race in 1990 at Heartland Park Topeka, and was the AMA Superbike Rookie of the Year.

Duhamel won the 1991 Daytona 200, when he replaced the injured Randy Renfrow. He also won seven races en route to winning the AMA 600cc SuperSport Championship. He won the 1992 FIM World Endurance Team Championship with Team Kawasaki France. He finished twelfth in the 500cc Grand Prix World Championship that year for Team Yamaha France, the only time he raced at this level.

Duhamel was the 1993 AMA 600cc SuperSport Champion on a Kawasaki after winning seven races. He won the AMA Superbike final at Sears Point by beating Doug Polen by inches. In 1994, Harley-Davidson selected Duhamel to race its VR1000 Superbike. He led parts of the Mid-Ohio and Brainerd Superbike finals, which were the only times the Harley VR1000 led an AMA Superbike race.

Duhamel became the first Canadian to win the AMA Superbike title in 1995. He was named the 1995 AMA Pro Athlete of the Year. He had six consecutive AMA Superbike wins, which broke Wayne Rainey's record of five victories. Duhamel also dominated the 600 SuperSport Championship by winning nine of the 11 events. His eight straight victories broke Doug Polen's record. Duhamel finished third and fourth at the U.S. round of World Superbike, mirroring the results of teammate Mike Hale.

In 1996, Duhamel became the winningest rider in SuperSport with his 28th career victory. Duhamel won his fourth 600cc SuperSport Championship, after reaching the podium in all but three events. Duhamel won four Superbike races (Daytona, Pomona, Homestead, and Loudon) and had six podium finishes in ten events.

Duhamel won another 600 SuperSport title in 1997. He had five wins and two additional podium finishes on the way to his fifth series Championship. He had four wins in Superbike, and he finished second in the points. As in 1996, it was Doug Chandler who beat him for the AMA Superbike title.

Duhamel won four Superbike races in 1998 before he had a season-ending accident while qualifying at New Hampshire International Speedway. He had also scored two second-place finishes. He won the 600 SuperSport race at Sears Point. He still had lingering injuries as the 1999 season started. He stunned the crowd by winning both the AMA Superbike and 600 Supersport events at the season-opening Daytona 200 races. He had a second-place finish at Sears Point in the 600 SuperSport race before his season was cut short by crashing at Road Atlanta.

Duhamel won the 2000 Brainerd event in the Superbike Championship. He also won the Road America event for Honda. He had four 2001 AMA Superbike podium finishes for Honda. He won AMA SuperSport races at Daytona, Mid-Ohio, and Brainerd. Duhamel swept both 2002 events at Road America. He also had five Superbike podium finishes en route to finishing third in the Superbike points.

In 2003, Duhamel was with American Honda. He earned his fourth AMA Superbike victory at Daytona and made seven additional podium appearances in the series. He also raced in AMA Supersport, taking a win at Brainerd International Raceway and two additional series podium finishes. Duhamel won the Daytona 200 in 2004. He had seven additional podium finishes. He had a Supersport victory at Brainerd and two additional podium finishes. He won the 2004 AMA Formula Xtreme Championship.

Duhamel won the 2005 AMA Formula Xtreme Championship with four wins and five second-place finishes in nine events. He battled Jake Zemke in a close race for the Championship. In Superbike, he had podium finishes at Road Atlanta and Mid-Ohio on his Honda.

Duhamel had a wildcard ride for Gresini Honda at the United States Grand Prix held on July 22, 2007 at Mazda Raceway Laguna Seca, replacing the injured Toni Elías and thus Duhamel hold the longest return gap in the sport to date. He pulled out of the MotoGP race early because he was unable to get a feel for the unfamiliar Honda RC212V he was riding. He also raced the AMA Superbike round at the same meeting Duhamel had a crash while practicing at Road Atlanta on August 8, 2007. He suffered a lacerated liver, and a perforated and bruised lung.

In 2008, Duhamel again raced for the Factory Honda Superbike team in AMA Superbike, riding a CBR1000RR-based Superbike, and he scored five top-five finishes. Duhamel finished seventh in the 2008 AMA Superbike points standings. In 2012, Miguel won the FIM e-Power & TTXGP race despite a three-year break from competition. The Canadian had lost nothing of his will to win as he rode the US Barracuda Lightning Racing Team's electric motorcycle.

In February 2016, Duhamel announced that he would come out of retirement to race in the Bol d'Or Classic endurance race in France held on September 15–17, 2016.

== Career statistics ==
=== FIM Endurance World Endurance ===
Year	Bike	Rider	TC
1990	Suzuki	(Canada) Miguel Duhamel	3rd

=== Grand Prix motorcycle racing ===
All stats from MotoGP.com

==== Races by year ====
(key)

Year	Class	Bike	1	2	3	4	5	6	7	8	9	10	11	12	13	14	15	16	17	18	Pos	Pts
1992	500cc	Yamaha	JPN; Ret	AUS; 10	MAL; Ret	SPA; 9	ITA; 7	EUR; 8	GER; 11	NED; 6	HUN; 11	FRA; 7	GBR; 7	BRA; 5	RSA; 9						12th	31
2007	MotoGP	Honda	QAT	SPA	TUR	CHN	FRA	ITA	CAT	GBR	NED	GER	USA; Ret	CZE	RSM	POR	JPN	AUS	MAL	VAL	NC	0

=== MotoAmerica SuperBike Championship ===
Year	Class	Team	1		2		3		4		5		6		7	8		9		10		11		Pos	Pts
Year	Class	Team	R1	R2	R1	R2	R1	R2	R1	R2	R1	R2	R1	R2	R1	R1	R2	R1	R2	R1	R2	R1	R2	Pos	Pts
2004	SuperBike	Honda	DAY; 3		FON; 3	FON; 4	INF; 2	INF; 1	BAR; 3	BAR; 1	PPK; 4		RAM; 1	RAM; 1	BRD; 2	LAG; 3		M-O; 2	M-O; Ret	RAT; 2	RAT; 2	VIR; 1	VIR; 1	2nd	551
2005	SuperBike	Honda	DAY; 6		BAR; 5	BAR; 4	FON; 4	FON; 18	INF; 25	INF; 6	PPK; 9		RAM; 7	RAM; 22	LAG; 6	M-O; 4	M-O; 2	VIR; 5	VIR; 4	RAT; 3	RAT; 9			5th	392
2006	SuperBike	Honda	DAY; 3		BAR; 4	BAR; 2	FON; 6	FON; 4	INF; 3	INF; 3	RAM; 4	RAM; 5	MIL; 7	MIL; 4	LAG; 4	OHI; 3	OHI; 3	VIR; 4	VIR; 3	RAT; 4	RAT; 5	OHI; 16		3rd	511
2007	SuperBike	Suzuki	DAY; 2		BAR; 3	BAR; 3	FON; 5	FON; 6	INF; 3	INF; 4	RAM; 4	RAM; Ret	MIL; 5	MIL; 3	LAG; 4	OHI; 3	OHI; 6	VIR; DNS	VIR; DNS	RAT	RAT	LAG		8th	360
2008	SuperBike	Honda	DAY; 12		BAR; 6	BAR; 8	FON; 7	FON; Ret	INF; 10	INF; 7	MIL; 5	MIL; 6	RAM; 5	RAM; 6	LAG; 10	OHI; 21	OHI; 6	VIR; 5	VIR; 4	RAT; 7	RAT; 4	LAG; 7		7th	412
2010	SuperBike	Ducati	DAY	DAY	FON	FON	RAT	RAT	INF	INF	RAM	RAM	MOH	MOH	LAG; DNS	VIR	VIR	NJE	NJE	BAR	BAR			NC	0

=== AMA Formula Xtreme Championship ===
==== By year ====
Year	Class	Bike	1	2	3	4	5	6	7	8	9	10	11	Pos	Pts
2004	Formula Xtreme	Honda	DAY; 1	FON; 1	INF; 1	BAR; 2	PPK; 2	RAM; 1	BRD; 1	LAG; 2	M-O; 1	RAT; 1	VIR; 1	1st	395
2005	Formula Xtreme	Honda	DAY; 1	BAR; 2	FON; 2	INF; 2	PPK; 2	RAM; 1	LAG	M-O; 2	VIR; 1	RAT; 1		1st	314
2006	Formula Xtreme	Honda	DAY; 5	BAR	FON	INF	RAM	MIL	LAG	OHI	VIR	RAT	OHI	40th	27
