= Michael Rudroff =

German motorcycle racer

- Nationality: German
- Born: 28 December 1960 (age 65)
Motorcycle racing career statistics
500cc World Championship
Active years	1987–1989, 1991–1993, 1996
Manufacturers	Honda, Harris Yamaha, Suzuki
Starts / Wins / Podiums / Poles / F. laps / Points; 53 / 0 / 1 / 0 / 0 / 67
Superbike World Championship
Active years	1990, 1995, 1997
Manufacturers	Bimota, Ducati, Suzuki
1997 championship position	NC (0 pts)
Starts / Wins / Podiums / Poles / F. laps / Points; 10 / 0 / 0 / 0 / 0 / 7

Michael Rudroff (born 28 December 1960) is a German former professional Grand Prix motorcycle road racer.

Rudolf competed in his first Grand Prix in 1987, and made one podium; coming third in the 1989 Nations Grand Prix. His career ranged from 1987 until 1996, where he started in 53 races, though he never started from pole position.

== Career ==
Rudroff, riding a Honda bike, appeared in two Grand Prix in 1987, the West Germany Grand Prix and the Austrian Grand Prix where he qualified in 38th and 26th but did not complete the races. He raced in the West German, Dutch TT and Yugoslavian Grand Prix in 1988, completing 28 laps and coming in 15th having started at 24th in Germany, completing 20 laps and coming in 19th having started in 31st in the Netherlands, and failing to qualify for the race in Yugoslavia.

1989 saw regular appearances for Rudroff, racing in the Australian Grand Prix where he finished 15th from a starting position of 21st, followed by the United States Grand Prix where he came 15th once more, having started from 21st. Following the Spanish Grand Prix, where he came 20th having begun at 23rd, he raced in the Nations Grand Prix. He began in 24th, and finished 3rd 33 laps later. This was the only podium in his career. He raced in West Germany, Austria, Yugoslavia, Netherlands and the Czechoslovak Grand Prix later that year. He ended the season with 18 championship points.

Rudroff competed in three rounds of the 1990 Superbike World Championship aboard a Bimota. He returned to Grand Prix competition in 1991, where he competed in ten races, and one other race in which he was not classified. This included a season-best 11th in the Australian Grand Prix, and he enjoyed a career-best 26 championship points. He made 13 more starts in 1992, now on a Harris Yamaha, but only returned three points despite coming 8th at the British Grand Prix. In 1993 he made 14 appearances again on the Yamaha, returning 17 points despite retiring from the Australian Grand Prix and the Japanese Grand Prix in the first lap. He was not seen again on the race track until 1996, where he raced one final time in the German Grand Prix on a Suzuki, but crashed out on the first lap.

== Career statistics ==
=== Grand Prix motorcycle racing ===
==== Races by year ====
(key) (Races in bold indicate pole position) (Races in italics indicate fastest lap)

Year	Class	Bike	1	2	3	4	5	6	7	8	9	10	11	12	13	14	15	Pos.	Pts
1987	500cc	Honda	JPN	SPA	GER; Ret	NAT	AUT; Ret	YUG	NED	FRA	GBR	SWE	TCH	RSM	POR	BRA	ARG	NC	0
1988	500cc	Honda	JPN	USA	SPA	EXP	NAT	GER; 15	AUT	NED; 19	BEL	YUG; Ret	FRA	GBR	SWE	TCH	BRA	37th	1
1989	500cc	Honda	JPN	AUS; 15	USA; 15	SPA; 20	NAT; 3	GER; 21	AUT; 19	YUG; 15	NED; 17	BEL	FRA	GBR	SWE	TCH; 20	BRA	20th	18
1991	500cc	Honda	JPN	AUS	USA	SPA; 15	ITA; 15	GER; 12	AUT; 11	EUR; 14	NED; 14	FRA; 14	GBR; 13	RSM; 14	TCH; 12	VDM; Ret	MAL	18th	26
1992	500cc	Harris-Yamaha	JPN; 15	AUS; 18	MAL; 14	SPA; 16	ITA; 16	EUR; 18	GER; 14	NED; 11	HUN; 16	FRA; 14	GBR; 8	BRA; 15	RSA; 19			21st	3
1993	500cc	Harris-Yamaha	AUS; Ret	MAL; 17	JPN; Ret	SPA; Ret	AUT; 17	GER; 13	NED; 12	EUR; 17	RSM; Ret	GBR; 10	CZE; 13	ITA; 15	USA; 18	FIM; Ret		21st	17
1996	500cc	Suzuki	MAL	INA	JPN	SPA	ITA	FRA	NED	GER; Ret	GBR	AUT	CZE	IMO	CAT	BRA	AUS	NC	0

=== Superbike World Championship ===
==== Races by year ====
(key) (Races in bold indicate pole position) (Races in italics indicate fastest lap)

Year	Make	1		2		3		4		5		6		7		8		9		10		11		12		13		Pos.	Pts
Year	Make	R1	R2	R1	R2	R1	R2	R1	R2	R1	R2	R1	R2	R1	R2	R1	R2	R1	R2	R1	R2	R1	R2	R1	R2	R1	R2	Pos.	Pts
1990	Bimota	SPA	SPA	GBR	GBR	HUN	HUN	GER; 15	GER; Ret	CAN	CAN	USA	USA	AUT	AUT	JPN	JPN	FRA; Ret	FRA; 24	ITA; 13	ITA; 26	MAL	MAL	AUS	AUS	NZL	NZL	66th	4
1995	Ducati	GER	GER	SMR	SMR	GBR	GBR	ITA	ITA	SPA	SPA	AUT; 19	AUT; 13	USA	USA	EUR	EUR	JPN	JPN	NED	NED	INA	INA	AUS	AUS			51st	3
1997	Suzuki	AUS	AUS	SMR	SMR	GBR	GBR	GER; DNS	GER; DNS	ITA	ITA	USA	USA	EUR	EUR	AUT	AUT	NED; 17	NED; 18	SPA	SPA	JPN	JPN	INA	INA			NC	0
