= Bruno Casanova (motorcyclist) =

Italian motorcycle racer (born 1964)

- Nationality: Italian
- Born: 1 June 1964 (age 62); Cervia, Italy
Motorcycle racing career statistics
Grand Prix motorcycle racing
Active years	1987 - 1994
First race	1987 125cc Spanish Grand Prix
Last race	1994 125cc German Grand Prix
First win	1992 125cc German Grand Prix
Last win	1992 125cc German Grand Prix
Starts / Wins / Podiums / Poles / F. laps / Points; 89 / 1 / 16 / 6 / 5 / 406

Bruno Casanova (born 1 June 1964 in Cervia) is a former Italian Grand Prix motorcycle road racer. In 1986, he won the 80cc European road racing championship. In 1987, he finished in second place in the 125cc world championship won by Fausto Gresini. In 1992 he won the 125cc German Grand Prix, the only Grand Prix win of his career.

Sporting positions
Preceded by (Germany) Günter Schirnhofer	80 cc motorcycle European Champion; 1986	Succeeded by (Spain) Julián Miralles
