= Ezio Gianola =

Italian motorcycle racer (born 1960)

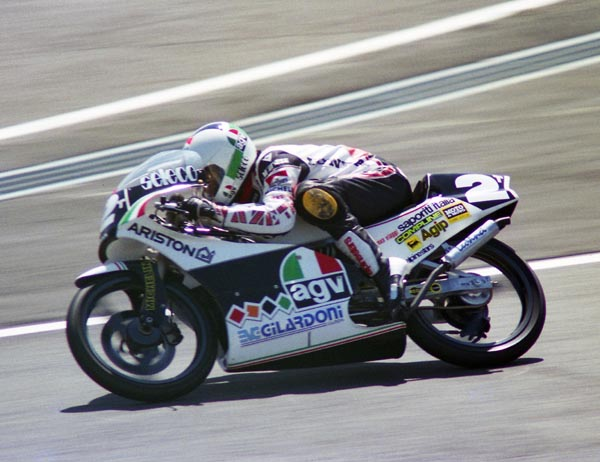
- Nationality: Italian
Motorcycle racing career statistics
Grand Prix motorcycle racing
| Active years | 1983 - 1993 |
| First race | 1983 125cc Nations Grand Prix |
| Last race | 1993 125cc FIM Grand Prix |
| First win | 1985 125cc French Grand Prix |
| Last win | 1992 125cc French Grand Prix |
| Team | Honda |
Starts / Wins / Podiums / Poles / F. laps / Points; 102 / 9 / 30 / 12 / 10 / 716

Ezio Moreno Gianola (born on 13 June 1960 in Lecco) is a former Italian Grand Prix motorcycle road racer. His best year was in 1988, when he won two races in the 125 class, finishing the season in second place behind Jorge Martínez. Gianola won four races in the 1992 season, but only managed to finish the 125 championship in fourth place. He ended his career with 9 Grands Prix victories.
