= Kevin Mitchell (motorcyclist) =

British motorcycle racer

- Nationality: British
- Born: 24 October 1961 (age 65)
Motorcycle racing career statistics
Grand Prix motorcycle racing
Active years	1987 – 1994
First race	1987 250cc Japanese Grand Prix
Last race	1994 500cc European Grand Prix
Team	Harris
Championships	0
Starts / Wins / Podiums / Poles / F. laps / Points; 79 / 0 / 0 / 0 / 0 / 11

Kevin Mitchell (born 24 October 1961) is a former British Grand Prix motorcycle road racer. He competed in the Grand Prix world championships from 1987 to 1994. He achieved his highest ranking in 1992, riding for Harris Performance Products on a Yamaha 500cc bike, when he had 12 starts and finished 27th; his highest point total was four, in 1988, on a 250cc Yamaha. He is a two-time winner of the North West 200, having won the event in 1984 & 1989.
