= Cees Doorakkers =

Dutch motorcycle racer

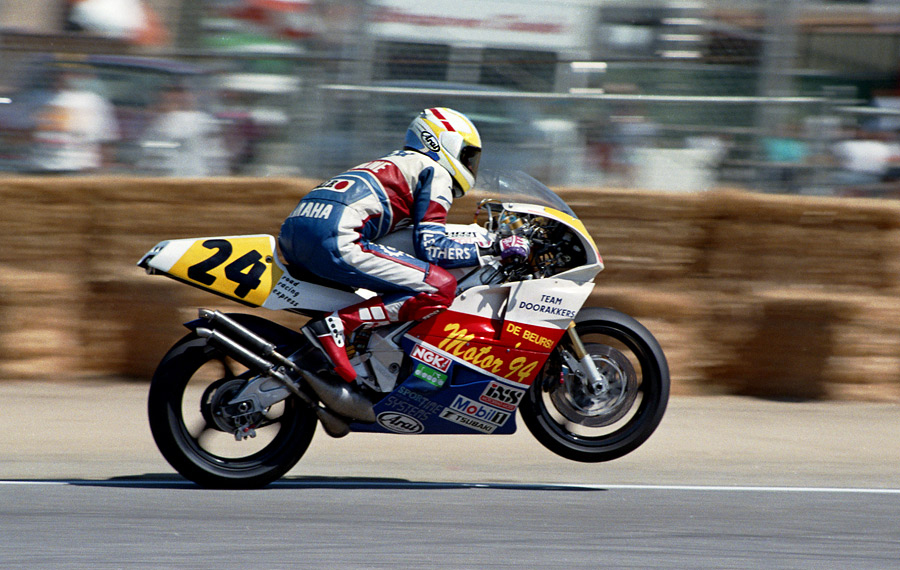
- Cees Doorakkers at the 1993 U.S. Grand Prix
- Nationality: Dutch
Motorcycle racing career statistics
Grand Prix motorcycle racing
Active years	1984 - 1995
First race	1984 250cc Dutch TT
Last race	1995 500cc Dutch TT
Starts / Wins / Podiums / Poles / F. laps / Points; 80 / 0 / 0 / 0 / 0 / 84.5

Cornelis Martinus Anthinius Maria Doorakkers (born 2 March 1963 in Gilze, Netherlands) is a former Grand Prix motorcycle road racer.

Doorakkers was the 250cc Dutch champion in 1984 and 1986. In 1986 he also reached the championship in the 500cc class. Doorakkers raced in the Grand Prix road race world championship between 1984 and 1995. Being a privateer without factory supported machines, he scored only a few points, his best result being a seventh place at the Yugoslavian Grand Prix in Rijeka in 1990. That season, he reached a total of 39 points, 16th in the final ranking.

In 1991, Doorakkers finished the season ranked as the top privateer, ranking 14th overall (40 points). Later years were plagued by lack of money, inferior equipment and bad luck, like the jamming of his new engine in the first race of the season in Australia.

In 1995, Doorakkers decided to retire from Grand Prix motorcycle racing.

In 1996, Doorakkers drove 125cc go karts (with transmission) for the Dutch championship and ended up fifth. Later on, he began motorcycle racing again with titles in the BOTT-class and Supermono; at the same time he raced in the Alfa Challenge with Alfa Romeo 156 and 147.

== Career statistics ==
=== Grand Prix motorcycle racing ===
==== Races by year ====
(key) (Races in bold indicate pole position) (Races in italics indicate fastest lap)

Year	Class	Bike	1	2	3	4	5	6	7	8	9	10	11	12	13	14	15	Pos.	Pts
1984	250cc	Yamaha	RSA	NAT	SPA	AUT	GER	FRA	YUG	NED; 17	BEL	GBR	SWE	RSM				NC	0
1985	250cc	Honda	RSA	SPA; DNQ	GER; 28	NAT	AUT	YUG; WD	NED; DNQ	BEL; DNQ	FRA; DNQ	GBR	SWE	RSM				NC	0
1986	250cc	Honda	SPA	NAT	GER; DNQ	AUT	YUG	NED; 17	BEL; 19	FRA	GBR; DNQ	SWE	RSM					NC	0
1987	250cc	Honda	JPN	SPA	GER	NAT	AUT	YUG	NED; 22	FRA	GBR; DNQ	SWE; DNQ	CZE	RSM	POR	BRA	ARG	NC	0
1988	500cc	Honda	JPN	USA	SPA	EXP	NAT	GER	AUT	NED; Ret	BEL; 15	YUG	FRA	GBR	SWE	CZE	BRA	37th	1
1989	500cc	Honda	JPN	AUS	USA	SPA	NAT	GER	AUT	YUG	NED; 15	BEL; 13	FRA; 25	GBR; Ret	SWE	CZE; Ret	BRA	43rd	2.5
1990	500cc	Honda	JPN	USA	SPA; 13	NAT; 14	GER; 10	AUT; 14	YUG; 7	NED; 13	BEL; 15	FRA; 12	GBR; 15	SWE; 12	CZE; 16	HUN; 16	AUS; 12	16th	39
1991	500cc	Honda	JPN; 22	AUS; 14	USA; 14	SPA; 13	ITA; 12	GER; 11	AUT; DNQ	EUR; 13	NED; 13	FRA; 12	GBR; 14	RSM; 13	CZE; 13	VDM; Ret	MAL; 10	14th	40
1992	500cc	Harris Yamaha	JPN; DNQ	AUS; 17	MAL; 12	SPA; 17	ITA; 19	EUR; Ret	GER; 19	NED; 12	HUN; 17	FRA; 13	GBR; 15	BRA; 22	RSA; Ret			NC	0
1993	500cc	Harris Yamaha	AUS; 21	MAL; 19	JPN; 23	SPA; 16	AUT; Ret	GER; 20	NED; 21	EUR; 14	RSM; Ret	GBR; 19	CZE; Ret	ITA; Ret	USA; Ret	FIM; 21		37th	2
1994	500cc	Harris Yamaha	AUS; 25	MAL; 19	JPN; Ret	SPA; 19	AUT; Ret	GER; 18	NED; 18	ITA; 21	FRA; Ret	GBR; 21	CZE; 20	USA; 20	ARG; 18	EUR; 19		NC	0
1995	500cc	Harris Yamaha	AUS	MAL	JPN	SPA	GER	ITA	NED; Ret	FRA	GBR	CZE	BRA	ARG	EUR			NC	0

== Achievements ==
- 5th and 6th in the 24 Hours of Le Mans (motorcycle race)
- 2 times beste privateer World Championship GP road race (1991: 14th; 1990: 16th)
- 2 times Dutch champion 250cc
- Dutch champion 500cc
- 5 times Dutch champion
