= 1994 Dutch TT =

(Netherlands) 1994 Dutch Grand Prix
Race details
- Race 7 of 14 races in the 1994 Grand Prix motorcycle racing season
- Date: 25 June 1994
- Official name: Lucky Strike Dutch Grand Prix
- Location: TT Circuit Assen
- Course: Permanent racing facility; 6.049 km (3.759 mi)

MotoGP
Pole position
- Rider: (Australia) Mick Doohan
- Time: 2:03.035
Fastest lap
- Rider: (Australia) Mick Doohan
- Time: 2:03.144
Podium
- First: (Australia) Mick Doohan
- Second: (Brazil) Alex Barros
- Third: (Spain) Àlex Crivillé

250cc
Pole position
- Rider: (Italy) Max Biaggi
- Time: 2:05.997
Fastest lap
- Rider: (Italy) Max Biaggi
- Time: 2:06.357
Podium
- First: (Italy) Max Biaggi
- Second: (Japan) Tadayuki Okada
- Third: (Netherlands) Wilco Zeelenberg

125cc
Pole position
- Rider: (Japan) Noboru Ueda
- Time: 2:15.344
Fastest lap
- Rider: (Japan) Takeshi Tsujimura
- Time: 2:16.586
Podium
- First: (Japan) Takeshi Tsujimura
- Second: (Spain) Jorge Martínez
- Third: (Netherlands) Loek Bodelier

The 1994 Dutch TT was the seventh round of the 1994 Grand Prix motorcycle racing season. It took place on 25 June 1994 at the TT Circuit Assen located in Assen, Netherlands.

== 500 cc classification ==
Pos.	Rider	Team	Manufacturer	Laps	Time/Retired	Points
1	(Australia) Mick Doohan	Honda Team HRC	Honda	20	41:35.272	25
2	(Brazil) Alex Barros	Lucky Strike Suzuki	Suzuki	20	+1.900	20
3	(Spain) Àlex Crivillé	Honda Team HRC	Honda	20	+7.446	16
4	(Spain) Alberto Puig	Ducados Honda Pons	Honda	20	+17.956	13
5	(United States) Kevin Schwantz	Lucky Strike Suzuki	Suzuki	20	+23.859	11
6	(United States) Doug Chandler	Cagiva Team Agostini	Cagiva	20	+24.464	10
7	(Australia) Daryl Beattie	Marlboro Team Roberts	Yamaha	20	+35.032	9
8	(United States) John Kocinski	Cagiva Team Agostini	Cagiva	20	+49.137	8
9	(Italy) Luca Cadalora	Marlboro Team Roberts	Yamaha	20	+56.706	7
10	(France) Bernard Garcia	Yamaha Motor France	ROC Yamaha	20	+1:08.869	6
11	(France) Jean Pierre Jeandat	JPJ Racing	ROC Yamaha	20	+1:33.281	5
12	(Belgium) Laurent Naveau	Euro Team	ROC Yamaha	20	+1:34.183	4
13	(Spain) Julián Miralles	Team ROC	ROC Yamaha	20	+1:56.476	3
14	(France) Bruno Bonhuil	MTD Objectif 500	ROC Yamaha	20	+1:56.761	2
15	(France) Jean Foray	Jean Foray Racing Team	ROC Yamaha	20	+1:57.553	1
16	(Switzerland) Bernard Haenggeli	Haenggeli Racing	ROC Yamaha	20	+1:57.632	
17	(United Kingdom) Kevin Mitchell	MBM Racing	Harris Yamaha	19	+1 Lap	
18	(Netherlands) Cees Doorakkers	Team Doorakkers	Harris Yamaha	19	+1 Lap	
19	(Italy) Vittorio Scatola	Team Paton	Paton	19	+1 Lap	
Ret	(United Kingdom) John Reynolds	Padgett's Motorcycles	Harris Yamaha	14	Accident	
Ret	(Italy) Loris Reggiani	Aprilia Racing Team	Aprilia	11	Retirement	
Ret	(United Kingdom) Sean Emmett	Shell Harris Grand Prix	Harris Yamaha	11	Accident	
Ret	(United Kingdom) Jeremy McWilliams	Millar Racing	Yamaha	7	Retirement	
Ret	(Japan) Shinichi Itoh	Honda Team HRC	Honda	5	Accident	
Ret	(Italy) Cristiano Migliorati	Team Pedercini	ROC Yamaha	4	Retirement	
Ret	(Italy) Lucio Pedercini	Team Pedercini	ROC Yamaha	4	Retirement	
Ret	(Germany) Lothar Neukirchen	Sachsen Racing Team	Harris Yamaha	4	Retirement	
Ret	(Luxembourg) Andreas Leuthe	Team Doppler Austria	ROC Yamaha	2	Retirement	
Ret	(United Kingdom) Niall Mackenzie	Slick 50 Team WCM	ROC Yamaha	2	Rider In Pain	
Ret	(France) Marc Garcia	DR Team Shark	ROC Yamaha	2	Retirement	
Ret	(Spain) Juan López Mella	Lopez Mella Racing Team	ROC Yamaha	1	Retirement	

== 250 cc classification ==
Pos	Rider	Manufacturer	Laps	Time/Retired	Points
1	(Italy) Max Biaggi	Aprilia	18	38:19.086	25
2	(Japan) Tadayuki Okada	Honda	18	+28.702	20
3	(Netherlands) Wilco Zeelenberg	Honda	18	+28.966	16
4	(Germany) Ralf Waldmann	Honda	18	+29.221	13
5	(Japan) Nobuatsu Aoki	Honda	18	+29.732	11
6	(France) Jean-Michel Bayle	Aprilia	18	+29.939	10
7	(Spain) Luis D'Antin	Honda	18	+56.630	9
8	(Switzerland) Eskil Suter	Aprilia	18	+58.720	8
9	(Netherlands) Jurgen vd Goorbergh	Aprilia	18	+59.122	7
10	(Netherlands) Patrick vd Goorbergh	Aprilia	18	+1:06.736	6
11	(Spain) Carlos Checa	Honda	18	+1:06.823	5
12	(Italy) Giuseppe Fiorillo	Honda	18	+1:06.881	4
13	(Japan) Toshihiko Honma	Yamaha	18	+1:09.408	3
14	(Germany) Bernd Kassner	Aprilia	18	+1:18.421	2
15	(Germany) Adolf Stadler	Honda	18	+1:39.076	1
16	(Spain) Luis Maurel	Honda	18	+1:39.182	
17	(France) Christian Boudinot	Aprilia	18	+1:39.368	
18	(France) Noel Ferro	Honda	18	+1:39.388	
19	(Finland) Krisse Kaas	Yamaha	18	+2:08.966	
20	(Spain) Manuel Hernandez	Aprilia	18	+2:13.140	
21	(Netherlands) Rudie Markink	Honda	17	+1 Lap	
22	(Canada) Rodney Fee	Honda	17	+1 Lap	
23	(Netherlands) Jaunlino Kirindongo	Honda	17	+1 Lap	
Ret	(United Kingdom) Alan Patterson	Honda	11	Retirement	
Ret	(Spain) José Luis Cardoso	Aprilia	10	Retirement	
Ret	(Spain) Enrique de Juan	Aprilia	9	Retirement	
Ret	(France) Frederic Protat	Honda	7	Retirement	
Ret	(Switzerland) Adrien Bosshard	Honda	6	Retirement	
Ret	(Italy) Doriano Romboni	Honda	2	Accident	
Ret	(Italy) Loris Capirossi	Honda	2	Collision	
Ret	(Japan) Tetsuya Harada	Yamaha	2	Collision	
Ret	(Austria) Andreas Preining	Aprilia	1	Retirement	
Ret	(France) Jean Philippe Ruggia	Aprilia	1	Retirement	
DNS	(Italy) Alessandro Gramigni	Aprilia		Did not start	

- Alessandro Gramigni suffered a shoulder injury in a crash during practice and withdrew from the event.

== 125 cc classification ==
Pos	Rider	Manufacturer	Laps	Time/Retired	Points
1	(Japan) Takeshi Tsujimura	Honda	17	39:07.728	25
2	(Spain) Jorge Martinez	Yamaha	17	+0.230	20
3	(Netherlands) Loek Bodelier	Honda	17	+0.942	16
4	(Japan) Kazuto Sakata	Aprilia	17	+1.134	13
5	(Japan) Masaki Tokudome	Honda	17	+17.249	11
6	(Spain) Herri Torrontegui	Aprilia	17	+17.254	10
7	(Switzerland) Olivier Petrucciani	Aprilia	17	+32.162	9
8	(Australia) Garry McCoy	Aprilia	17	+36.887	8
9	(Japan) Hideyuki Nakajo	Honda	17	+37.022	7
10	(Italy) Gabriele Debbia	Aprilia	17	+39.666	6
11	(Spain) Emilio Alzamora	Honda	17	+45.138	5
12	(Japan) Haruchika Aoki	Honda	17	+45.289	4
13	(Italy) Gianluigi Scalvini	Aprilia	17	+45.408	3
14	(France) Frederic Petit	Yamaha	17	+45.477	2
15	(Italy) Lucio Cecchinello	Honda	17	+46.005	1
16	(Italy) Fausto Gresini	Honda	17	+1:12.124	
17	(Austria) Manfred Baumann	Yamaha	17	+1:15.638	
18	(United Kingdom) Neil Hodgson	Honda	17	+1:24.380	
19	(Italy) Vittorio Lopez	Honda	17	+1:28.763	
20	(Netherlands) Hans Spaan	Honda	17	+1:35.495	
21	(Netherlands) Rick van Etten	Honda	17	+2:03.352	
22	(Netherlands) Marcel Nooren	Honda	17	+2:04.854	
Ret	(Germany) Peter Öttl	Aprilia	16	Accident	
Ret	(Japan) Tomomi Manako	Honda	12	Retirement	
Ret	(Germany) Manfred Geissler	Aprilia	12	Accident	
Ret	(Italy) Stefano Perugini	Aprilia	9	Accident	
Ret	(Germany) Stefan Prein	Yamaha	9	Accident	
Ret	(Germany) Dirk Raudies	Honda	3	Mechanical	
Ret	(Netherlands) Bert Smit	Honda	3	Mechanical	
Ret	(Japan) Noboru Ueda	Honda	2	Accident	
Ret	(Japan) Yoshiaki Katoh	Yamaha	2	Accident	
Ret	(Japan) Akira Saito	Honda	0	Accident	
Ret	(Spain) Carlos Giro	Aprilia	0	Retirement	
DNS	(Italy) Bruno Casanova	Honda		Did not start	
DNS	(France) Nicolas Dussauge	Honda		Did not start	
DNS	(Germany) Oliver Koch	Honda		Did not start	

- Bruno Casanova suffered a broken leg in a crash during practice and missed the remainder of the season.
- Oliver Koch suffered a broken arm & collarbone in a crash during practice and missed the next three rounds of the season.

Previous race: 1994 German Grand Prix	FIM Grand Prix World Championship; 1994 season	Next race: 1994 Italian Grand Prix
Previous race: 1993 Dutch TT	Dutch TT	Next race: 1995 Dutch TT
