= 1994 German motorcycle Grand Prix =

(Germany) 1994 German Grand Prix
Race details
- Race 6 of 14 races in the 1994 Grand Prix motorcycle racing season
- Date: 12 June 1994
- Official name: Grand Prix Deutschland
- Location: Hockenheimring
- Course: Permanent racing facility; 6.823 km (4.240 mi)

MotoGP
Pole position
- Rider: (Australia) Mick Doohan
- Time: 1:58.946
Fastest lap
- Rider: (Australia) Mick Doohan
- Time: 1:58.586
Podium
- First: (Australia) Mick Doohan
- Second: (United States) Kevin Schwantz
- Third: (Spain) Alberto Puig

250cc
Pole position
- Rider: (Italy) Loris Capirossi
- Time: 2:04.853
Fastest lap
- Rider: (Italy) Loris Capirossi
- Time: 2:04.820
Podium
- First: (Italy) Loris Capirossi
- Second: (Italy) Max Biaggi
- Third: (Italy) Doriano Romboni

125cc
Pole position
- Rider: (Japan) Noboru Ueda
- Time: 2:19.260
Fastest lap
- Rider: (Germany) Dirk Raudies
- Time: 2:17.764
Podium
- First: (Germany) Dirk Raudies
- Second: (Japan) Kazuto Sakata
- Third: (Japan) Tomomi Manako

The 1994 German motorcycle Grand Prix was the sixth round of the 1994 Grand Prix motorcycle racing season. It took place on 12 June 1994 at the Hockenheimring.

== 500 cc classification ==
Pos.	Rider	Team	Manufacturer	Laps	Time/Retired	Points
1	(Australia) Mick Doohan	Honda Team HRC	Honda	18	35:58.994	25
2	(United States) Kevin Schwantz	Lucky Strike Suzuki	Suzuki	18	+13.982	20
3	(Spain) Alberto Puig	Ducados Honda Pons	Honda	18	+15.764	16
4	(Spain) Àlex Crivillé	Honda Team HRC	Honda	18	+19.536	13
5	(Brazil) Alex Barros	Lucky Strike Suzuki	Suzuki	18	+33.120	11
6	(Japan) Shinichi Itoh	Honda Team HRC	Honda	18	+33.293	10
7	(United States) Doug Chandler	Cagiva Team Agostini	Cagiva	18	+47.202	9
8	(United Kingdom) Niall Mackenzie	Slick 50 Team WCM	ROC Yamaha	18	+1:06.290	8
9	(France) Bernard Garcia	Yamaha Motor France	ROC Yamaha	18	+1:12.980	7
10	(United Kingdom) John Reynolds	Padgett's Motorcycles	Harris Yamaha	18	+1:36.643	6
11	(United Kingdom) Sean Emmett	Shell Harris Grand Prix	Harris Yamaha	18	+1:37.566	5
12	(Spain) Juan López Mella	Lopez Mella Racing Team	ROC Yamaha	18	+1:54.308	4
13	(Spain) Julián Miralles	Team ROC	ROC Yamaha	18	+1:54.555	3
14	(Belgium) Laurent Naveau	Euro Team	ROC Yamaha	18	+1:54.726	2
15	(France) Bruno Bonhuil	MTD Objectif 500	ROC Yamaha	17	+1 Lap	1
16	(United Kingdom) Kevin Mitchell	MBM Racing	Harris Yamaha	17	+1 Lap	
17	(Luxembourg) Andreas Leuthe	Team Doppler Austria	ROC Yamaha	17	+1 Lap	
18	(Netherlands) Cees Doorakkers	Team Doorakkers	Harris Yamaha	17	+1 Lap	
19	(Germany) Lothar Neukirchen	Sachsen Racing Team	Harris Yamaha	17	+1 Lap	
Ret	(Australia) Daryl Beattie	Marlboro Team Roberts	Yamaha	17	Out Of Fuel	
Ret	(Switzerland) Bernard Haenggeli	Haenggeli Racing	ROC Yamaha	16	Retirement	
Ret	(Germany) Udo Mark	Sachsen Racing Team	Harris Yamaha	14	Accident	
Ret	(France) Jean Pierre Jeandat	JPJ Racing	ROC Yamaha	13	Retirement	
Ret	(United Kingdom) Jeremy McWilliams	Millar Racing	Yamaha	12	Accident	
Ret	(Italy) Cristiano Migliorati	Team Pedercini	ROC Yamaha	10	Accident	
Ret	(France) Jean Foray	Jean Foray Racing Team	ROC Yamaha	8	Retirement	
Ret	(Italy) Lucio Pedercini	Team Pedercini	ROC Yamaha	6	Retirement	
Ret	(Italy) Marco Papa	Team Elit	ROC Yamaha	4	Retirement	
Ret	(Italy) Loris Reggiani	Aprilia Racing Team	Aprilia	3	Retirement	
Ret	(France) Marc Garcia	DR Team Shark	ROC Yamaha	1	Retirement	
DNS	(United States) John Kocinski	Cagiva Team Agostini	Cagiva		Did not start	
DNS	(Italy) Luca Cadalora	Marlboro Team Roberts	Yamaha		Did not start	
DNQ	(Italy) Vittorio Scatola	Team Paton	Paton		Did not qualify	
DNQ	(Germany) Manfred Erhardt	Manfred Erhardt	Harris Yamaha		Did not qualify	
Sources:

- John Kocinski (broken hand) & Luca Cadalora (hand) withdrew from the event following crashes in practice.

== 250 cc classification ==
Pos	Rider	Manufacturer	Laps	Time/Retired	Points
1	(Italy) Loris Capirossi	Honda	16	33:43.516	25
2	(Italy) Max Biaggi	Aprilia	16	+0.284	20
3	(Italy) Doriano Romboni	Honda	16	+0.425	16
4	(Japan) Nobuatsu Aoki	Honda	16	+1.292	13
5	(Japan) Tadayuki Okada	Honda	16	+1.625	11
6	(Germany) Ralf Waldmann	Honda	16	+13.586	10
7	(Japan) Tetsuya Harada	Yamaha	16	+13.621	9
8	(France) Jean Philippe Ruggia	Aprilia	16	+14.294	8
9	(Spain) Luis D'Antin	Honda	16	+39.504	7
10	(Netherlands) Wilco Zeelenberg	Honda	16	+39.558	6
11	(France) Jean-Michel Bayle	Aprilia	16	+39.802	5
12	(Netherlands) Patrick vd Goorbergh	Aprilia	16	+1:13.235	4
13	(Austria) Andreas Preining	Aprilia	16	+1:13.300	3
14	(Spain) Carlos Checa	Honda	16	+1:17.324	2
15	(Germany) Adolf Stadler	Honda	16	+1:22.426	1
16	(Spain) Luis Maurel	Honda	16	+1:23.120	
17	(Italy) Alessandro Gramigni	Aprilia	16	+1:24.136	
18	(Germany) Jürgen Fuchs	Honda	16	+1:38.098	
19	(Italy) Giuseppe Fiorillo	Honda	16	+1:47.080	
20	(France) Noel Ferro	Honda	16	+2:11.344	
21	(Spain) José Luis Cardoso	Aprilia	16	+2:11.864	
22	(Finland) Krisse Kaas	Yamaha	15	+1 Lap	
23	(Spain) Manuel Hernandez	Aprilia	15	+1 Lap	
Ret	(Germany) Bernd Kassner	Aprilia	14	Retirement	
Ret	(Switzerland) Eskil Suter	Aprilia	14	Retirement	
Ret	(Netherlands) Jurgen vd Goorbergh	Aprilia	11	Accident	
Ret	(Japan) Toshihiko Honma	Yamaha	11	Retirement	
Ret	(Germany) Peter Koller	Honda	10	Retirement	
Ret	(France) Frederic Protat	Honda	8	Retirement	
Ret	(United Kingdom) Alan Patterson	Honda	8	Retirement	
Ret	(Canada) Rodney Fee	Honda	4	Retirement	
Ret	(France) Christian Boudinot	Aprilia	4	Retirement	
DNS	(Spain) Enrique de Juan	Aprilia		Did not start	
DNS	(Switzerland) Adrian Bosshard	Honda		Did not start	

== 125 cc classification ==
Pos	Rider	Manufacturer	Laps	Time/Retired	Points
1	(Germany) Dirk Raudies	Honda	15	34:44.974	25
2	(Japan) Kazuto Sakata	Aprilia	15	+17.025	20
3	(Japan) Tomomi Manako	Honda	15	+17.319	16
4	(Germany) Peter Öttl	Aprilia	15	+17.345	13
5	(Italy) Stefano Perugini	Aprilia	15	+17.946	11
6	(Japan) Noboru Ueda	Honda	15	+30.406	10
7	(Spain) Jorge Martinez	Yamaha	15	+30.504	9
8	(Japan) Akira Saito	Honda	15	+30.908	8
9	(Japan) Masaki Tokudome	Honda	15	+31.056	7
10	(Switzerland) Olivier Petrucciani	Aprilia	15	+31.470	6
11	(Germany) Oliver Koch	Honda	15	+31.558	5
12	(Italy) Bruno Casanova	Honda	15	+31.878	4
13	(Italy) Fausto Gresini	Honda	15	+31.912	3
14	(Italy) Lucio Cecchinello	Honda	15	+31.996	2
15	(Netherlands) Loek Bodelier	Honda	15	+54.520	1
16	(United Kingdom) Neil Hodgson	Honda	15	+1:06.782	
17	(France) Frederic Petit	Yamaha	15	+1:07.027	
18	(Austria) Manfred Baumann	Yamaha	15	+1:41.966	
19	(Italy) Vittorio Lopez	Honda	15	+1:42.072	
20	(Spain) Carlos Giro	Aprilia	15	+1:42.462	
21	(Germany) Stefan Prein	Yamaha	15	+1:54.671	
22	(Spain) Emilio Alzamora	Honda	15	+2:06.328	
23	(Netherlands) Rick van Etten	Honda	14	+1 Lap	
Ret	(France) Nicolas Dussauge	Honda	10	Accident	
Ret	(Netherlands) Hans Spaan	Honda	10	Accident	
Ret	(Japan) Hideyuki Nakajo	Honda	9	Retirement	
Ret	(Japan) Takeshi Tsujimura	Honda	8	Retirement	
Ret	(Japan) Yoshiaki Katoh	Yamaha	7	Retirement	
Ret	(Germany) Maik Stief	Honda	6	Retirement	
Ret	(Germany) Manfred Geissler	Aprilia	6	Retirement	
Ret	(Germany) Stefan Kurfiss	Honda	4	Retirement	
Ret	(Spain) Herri Torrontegui	Aprilia	4	Retirement	
Ret	(Italy) Gabriele Debbia	Aprilia	2	Retirement	
Ret	(Italy) Emilio Cuppini	Aprilia	1	Accident	
DNS	(Australia) Garry McCoy	Yamaha		Did not start	
DNQ	(Japan) Haruchika Aoki	Honda		Did not qualify	

Previous race: 1994 Austrian Grand Prix	FIM Grand Prix World Championship; 1994 season	Next race: 1994 Dutch TT
Previous race: 1993 German Grand Prix	German Grand Prix	Next race: 1995 German Grand Prix
