= 1989 German motorcycle Grand Prix =

(West Germany) 1989 German Grand Prix
Race details
- Race 6 of 15 races in the 1989 Grand Prix motorcycle racing season
- Date: 28 May 1989
- Official name: Großer Preis von Deutschland für Motorräder
- Location: Hockenheimring
- Course: Permanent racing facility; 6.789 km (4.218 mi)

500cc
Pole position
- Rider: (United States) Kevin Schwantz
- Time: 2:02.620
Fastest lap
- Rider: (United States) Kevin Schwantz
- Time: 2:02.680
Podium
- First: (United States) Wayne Rainey
- Second: (United States) Eddie Lawson
- Third: (Australia) Mick Doohan

250cc
Pole position
- Rider: (West Germany) Helmut Bradl
- Time: 2:11.040
Fastest lap
- Rider: (Spain) Sito Pons
- Time: 2:10.990
Podium
- First: (Spain) Sito Pons
- Second: (West Germany) Reinhold Roth
- Third: (Japan) Masahiro Shimizu

125cc
Pole position
- Rider: (Italy) Ezio Gianola
- Time: 2:23.640
Fastest lap
- Rider: (Spain) Julián Miralles
- Time: 2:24.160
Podium
- First: (Spain) Àlex Crivillé
- Second: (Italy) Ezio Gianola
- Third: (Spain) Julián Miralles

80cc
Pole position
- Rider: (Switzerland) Stefan Dörflinger
- Time: 2:32.240
Fastest lap
- Rider: Unknown
Podium
- First: (West Germany) Peter Öttl
- Second: (Spain) Manuel Herreros
- Third: (Spain) Herri Torrontegui

The 1989 German motorcycle Grand Prix was the sixth round of the 1989 Grand Prix motorcycle racing season. It took place on the weekend of 26–28 May 1989 at the Hockenheimring circuit.

The weekend was marred by the fatal accident of Italian-born Venezuelan rider Iván Palazzese in the 250cc race, who died after running into the back of Andreas Preining's seized motorcycle. Palazzese was then struck by Bruno Bonhuil and Fabio Barchitta while trying to pick himself up from the ground, causing him to suffer massive chest injuries that would result in his death.

== 500 cc race report ==
The front of the grid is Kevin Schwantz, Wayne Rainey and Eddie Lawson, who stay in that order through the first few turns, though Mick Doohan soon takes third spot behind Lawson and Rainey, pushing Schwantz into third.

Lawson seems to miss a shift at a chicane, and lets Rainey and Schwantz through, who have become the leading group of three. The group is tight, and Schwantz still hasn't broken himself of the habit of looking behind him for no good reason.

Lawson puts himself at the front again, while back down the field Niall Mackenzie crashes out.

Schwantz develops a mechanical problem and drops out, leaving Lawson and Rainey to fight it out for first and Doohan and Christian Sarron for third place.

Last lap: Lawson ahead for the first half, but Rainey gets past on the brakes to a chicane. Going into the stadium section, Rainey is doing everything to keep Lawson behind him, doing a tremendous slide on his Dunlops. Rainey takes a very close win from Lawson, with a big gap to Doohan, then Pierfrancesco Chili and Sarron.

Two DNFs in a row seem to have ended Schwantz's hope for the championship, who was already pessimistic since his crash at Jerez. Schwantz can still affect the outcome of the championship by getting between Lawson and Rainey and denying the latter some points. Rainey and Lawson needle each other after the race and then say nothing to each other for the rest of the season.

A 23-year old Mick Doohan achieved his first 500cc podium on this day.

== 500 cc classification ==
Pos.	Rider	Team	Manufacturer	Laps	Time/Retired	Grid	Points
1	(United States) Wayne Rainey	Team Lucky Strike Roberts	Yamaha	19	39:14.750	2	20
2	(United States) Eddie Lawson	Rothmans Kanemoto Honda	Honda	19	+0.270	3	17
3	(Australia) Mick Doohan	Rothmans Honda Team	Honda	19	+20.710	6	15
4	(Italy) Pierfrancesco Chili	HB Honda Gallina Team	Honda	19	+25.720	5	13
5	(France) Christian Sarron	Sonauto Gauloises Blondes Yamaha Mobil 1	Yamaha	19	+37.000	4	11
6	(Japan) Norihiko Fujiwara	Yamaha Motor Company	Yamaha	19	+42.980	11	10
7	(Australia) Kevin Magee	Team Lucky Strike Roberts	Yamaha	19	+43.540	10	9
8	(France) Dominique Sarron	Team ROC Elf Honda	Honda	19	+44.980	13	8
9	(United States) Freddie Spencer	Marlboro Yamaha Team Agostini	Yamaha	19	+53.020	9	7
10	(United Kingdom) Rob McElnea	Cabin Racing Team	Honda	19	+1:08.530	12	6
11	(West Germany) Ernst Gschwender	Suzuki Deutschland	Suzuki	18	+1 Lap	15	5
12	(United States) Randy Mamola	Cagiva Corse	Cagiva	18	+1 Lap	14	4
13	(Italy) Alessandro Valesi	Team Iberia	Yamaha	18	+1 Lap	16	3
14	(United Kingdom) Simon Buckmaster	Racing Team Katayama	Honda	18	+1 Lap	18	2
15	(Switzerland) Bruno Kneubuhler	Romer Racing Suisse	Honda	18	+1 Lap	19	1
16	(West Germany) Hansjoerg Butz	Autobus Butz Racing Team	Honda	18	+1 Lap	22	
17	(France) Rachel Nicotte		Chevallier Yamaha	18	+1 Lap	20	
18	(Italy) Vittorio Scatola		Honda	18	+1 Lap	23	
19	(Spain) Juan Lopez Mella	Club Motocross Pozuelo	Honda	18	+1 Lap	32	
20	(West Germany) Petr Schleef	Schuh Racing Team	Honda	18	+1 Lap	24	
21	(West Germany) Michael Rudroff	HRK Motors	Honda	18	+1 Lap	17	
22	(Austria) Josef Doppler		Honda	18	+1 Lap	25	
23	(Sweden) Peter Linden	Team Heukeroff	Honda	18	+1 Lap	28	
24	(West Germany) Stefan Klabacher		Honda	18	+1 Lap	30	
25	(West Germany) Helmut Schutz	Rallye Sport	Honda	18	+1 Lap	31	
26	(West Germany) Hans Klingebiel		Suzuki	18	+1 Lap	33	
Ret	(United Kingdom) Ron Haslam	Suzuki Pepsi Cola	Suzuki		Retirement	8	
Ret	(West Germany) Georg Robert Jung	Romer Telefix	Honda		Retirement	21	
Ret	(Switzerland) Marco Gentile	Fior Marlboro	Fior		Retirement	27	
Ret	(United States) Kevin Schwantz	Suzuki Pepsi Cola	Suzuki		Retirement	1	
Ret	(West Germany) Roland Busch	Schuh Racing Team	Honda		Retirement	35	
Ret	(Austria) Karl Dauer	PC Racing	Honda		Retirement	34	
Ret	(West Germany) Alois Meyer	Rallye Sport	Honda		Retirement	29	
Ret	(West Germany) Martin Troesch		Honda		Retirement	36	
Ret	(Switzerland) Nicholas Schmassman	FMS	Honda		Retirement	26	
Ret	(United Kingdom) Niall Mackenzie	Marlboro Yamaha Team Agostini	Yamaha		Retirement	7	
DNQ	(Italy) Marco Papa	Team Greco	Paton		Did not qualify		
DNQ	(Luxembourg) Andreas Leuthe	Librenti Corse	Suzuki		Did not qualify		
DNQ	(Spain) Francisco Gonzales	Club Motocross Pozuelo	Honda		Did not qualify		
DNQ	(Italy) Vincenzo Cascino		Honda		Did not qualify		
DNQ	(West Germany) Walther Maier	Rallye Sport	Honda		Did not qualify		

Previous race: 1989 Nations Grand Prix	FIM Grand Prix World Championship; 1989 season	Next race: 1989 Austrian Grand Prix
Previous race: 1988 German Grand Prix	German Grand Prix	Next race: 1990 German Grand Prix
