= 1989 Czechoslovak motorcycle Grand Prix =

(Czechoslovakia) 1989 Czechoslovak Grand Prix
Race details
- Race 14 of 15 races in the 1989 Grand Prix motorcycle racing season
- Date: 27 August 1989
- Official name: Grand Prix ČSSR-Brno
- Location: Brno Circuit
- Course: Permanent racing facility; 5.403 km (3.357 mi)

500cc
Pole position
- Rider: (United States) Kevin Schwantz
- Time: 2:03.160
Fastest lap
- Rider: (United States) Kevin Schwantz
- Time: 2:04.400
Podium
- First: (United States) Kevin Schwantz
- Second: (United States) Eddie Lawson
- Third: (United States) Wayne Rainey

250cc
Pole position
- Rider: (West Germany) Reinhold Roth
- Time: 2:08.500
Fastest lap
- Rider: (Spain) Juan Garriga
- Time: 2:09.670
Podium
- First: (West Germany) Reinhold Roth
- Second: (Japan) Masahiro Shimizu
- Third: (Switzerland) Jacques Cornu

125cc
Pole position
- Rider: (Spain) Àlex Crivillé
- Time: 2:16.370
Fastest lap
- Rider: (Japan) Koji Takada
- Time: 2:17.250
Podium
- First: (Spain) Àlex Crivillé
- Second: (Netherlands) Hans Spaan
- Third: (West Germany) Stefan Prein

80cc
Pole position
- Rider: (Switzerland) Stefan Dörflinger
- Time: 2:24.605
Fastest lap
- Rider: Unknown
Podium
- First: (Spain) Herri Torrontegui
- Second: (Spain) Manuel Herreros
- Third: (Spain) Jorge Martínez

The 1989 Czechoslovak motorcycle Grand Prix was the penultimate round of the 1989 Grand Prix motorcycle racing season. It took place on the weekend of 25–27 August 1989 at the Masaryk Circuit located in Brno, Czechoslovakia.

== 500 cc race report ==
8th pole position for Kevin Schwantz, with Eddie Lawson behind. Wayne Gardner crashes in practice and is unable to make the start.

Wayne Rainey gains the race lead from the start over pole-sitter Schwantz, who is also passed by Lawson followed by Christian Sarron, Pierfrancesco Chili, Kevin Magee.

Schwantz gets past Lawson and Rainey for the lead, while Sarron settles into fourth with a growing gap back to fifth place.

Lawson passes Rainey for second and then gets past Schwantz for the lead. The battle for fifth is split between Ron Haslam, Chili and Magee.

Lawson and Schwantz leave Rainey behind as they start to encounter back-marker traffic. Lawson need only finish just behind Rainey in the remaining two races, but it looks like he wants the win today, staying fast enough to keep Schwantz behind him for a little, until Schwantz overtakes again.

Niall Mackenzie moves up to fifth spot, ahead of Haslam, and Chili.

Schwantz gains from Lawson, who is fighting for grip further back. Despite Sarron catching Rainey, team orders allow Rainey to retain third position. Schwantz finishes first, followed by Lawson and Rainey in second and third respectively.

After this race Lawson held a 15.5 point lead on Rainey in the standings.

== 500 cc classification ==
Pos.	Rider	Team	Manufacturer	Laps	Time/Retired	Points
1	(United States) Kevin Schwantz	Suzuki Pepsi Cola	Suzuki	23	48:20.649	20
2	(United States) Eddie Lawson	Rothmans Kanemoto Honda	Honda	23	+5.977	17
3	(United States) Wayne Rainey	Team Lucky Strike Roberts	Yamaha	23	+26.031	15
4	(France) Christian Sarron	Sonauto Gauloises Blondes Yamaha Mobil 1	Yamaha	23	+26.056	13
5	(Italy) Pierfrancesco Chili	HB Honda Gallina Team	Honda	23	+51.153	11
6	(United Kingdom) Niall Mackenzie	Marlboro Yamaha Team Agostini	Yamaha	23	+51.158	10
7	(Australia) Kevin Magee	Team Lucky Strike Roberts	Yamaha	23	+52.931	9
8	(United Kingdom) Ron Haslam	Suzuki Pepsi Cola	Suzuki	23	+55.071	8
9	(Japan) Tadahiko Taira	Yamaha Motor Company	Yamaha	23	+1:19.178	7
10	(France) Adrien Morillas	Team ROC Elf Honda	Honda	23	+1:25.785	6
11	(United States) Randy Mamola	Cagiva Corse	Cagiva	23	+1:28.975	5
12	(United Kingdom) Rob McElnea	Cabin Racing Team	Honda	23	+1:50.777	4
13	(Italy) Alberto Rota	Marlboro Yamaha Team Agostini	Yamaha	22	+1 Lap	3
14	(Italy) Alessandro Valesi	Team Iberia	Yamaha	22	+1 Lap	2
15	(Sweden) Peter Linden	Team Heukeroff	Honda	22	+1 Lap	1
16	(Spain) Juan Lopez Mella	Club Motocross Pozuelo	Honda	22	+1 Lap	
17	(Republic of Ireland) Eddie Laycock		Honda	22	+1 Lap	
18	(Switzerland) Bruno Kneubühler	Romer Racing Suisse	Honda	22	+1 Lap	
19	(Italy) Fabio Biliotti	Racing Team Katayama	Honda	22	+1 Lap	
20	(West Germany) Michael Rudroff	HRK Motors	Honda	22	+1 Lap	
21	(United Kingdom) Simon Buckmaster	Racing Team Katayama	Honda	22	+1 Lap	
22	(West Germany) Stefan Klabacher		Honda	22	+1 Lap	
23	(Luxembourg) Andreas Leuthe	Librenti Corse	Suzuki	22	+1 Lap	
24	(Austria) Josef Doppler		Honda	22	+1 Lap	
25	(Spain) Francisco Gonzalez	Club Motocross Pozuelo	Honda	21	+2 Laps	
26	(Italy) Vincenzo Cascino		Suzuki	21	+2 Laps	
27	(Austria) Rudolf Zeller		Honda	21	+2 Laps	
28	(Czechoslovakia) Pavol Dekánek		Honda	21	+2 Laps	
29	(Italy) Dario Marchetti		Honda	21	+2 Laps	
30	(Netherlands) Harry Heutmekers		Suzuki	21	+2 Laps	
31	(Austria) Michael Kaplam		Honda	21	+2 Laps	
Ret	(West Germany) Helmut Schutz	Rallye Sport	Honda		Retirement	
Ret	(Netherlands) Cees Doorakkers	HRK Motors	Honda		Retirement	
Ret	(Italy) Marco Papa	Team Greco	Paton		Retirement	
Ret	(Austria) Karl Dauer	PC Racing	Honda		Retirement	
Ret	(Switzerland) Nicholas Schmassman	FMS	Honda		Retirement	
DNS	(Australia) Wayne Gardner	Rothmans Honda Team	Honda		Did not start	
DNQ	(Czechoslovakia) Marián Troliga		Suzuki		Did not qualify	
DNQ	(Austria) Anton Berghammer		Suzuki		Did not qualify	
DNQ	(United States) Peter Graves		Honda		Did not qualify	
DNQ	(West Germany) Hans Klingebiel		Honda		Did not qualify	
DNQ	(Republic of Ireland) Tony Carey	Spondon	Spondon Yamaha		Did not qualify	
DNQ	(West Germany) Norbert Heiles		Suzuki		Did not qualify	

Previous race: 1989 Swedish Grand Prix	FIM Grand Prix World Championship; 1989 season	Next race: 1989 Brazilian Grand Prix
Previous race: 1988 Czechoslovak Grand Prix	Czechoslovak Grand Prix	Next race: 1990 Czechoslovak Grand Prix
