= 1989 Dutch TT =

1989 motorcycle racing season round

(Netherlands) 1989 Dutch TT
Race details
- Race 9 of 15 races in the 1989 Grand Prix motorcycle racing season
- Date: 24 June 1989
- Official name: Dutch TT
- Location: TT Circuit Assen
- Course: Permanent racing facility; 6.049 km (3.759 mi)

500cc
Pole position
- Rider: (United States) Kevin Schwantz
- Time: 2:09.850
Fastest lap
- Rider: (United States) Kevin Schwantz
- Time: 2:09.160
Podium
- First: (United States) Wayne Rainey
- Second: (United States) Eddie Lawson
- Third: (France) Christian Sarron

250cc
Pole position
- Rider: (Spain) Sito Pons
- Time: 2:15.100
Fastest lap
- Rider: (Spain) Sito Pons
- Time: 2:15.090
Podium
- First: (Germany) Reinhold Roth
- Second: (Spain) Sito Pons
- Third: (Switzerland) Jacques Cornu

125cc
Pole position
- Rider: (Netherlands) Hans Spaan
- Time: 2:25.200
Fastest lap
- Rider: (Italy) Ezio Gianola
- Time: 2:24.840
Podium
- First: (Netherlands) Hans Spaan
- Second: (Spain) Àlex Crivillé
- Third: (Spain) Julián Miralles

80cc
Pole position
- Rider: (Switzerland) Stefan Dörflinger
- Time: 2:33.359
Fastest lap
- Rider: (Germany) Peter Öttl
- Time: 2:31.900
Podium
- First: (Germany) Peter Öttl
- Second: (Spain) Manuel Herreros
- Third: (Switzerland) Stefan Dörflinger

The 1989 Dutch TT was the ninth round of the 1989 Grand Prix motorcycle racing season. It took place on the weekend of 22–24 June 1989 at the TT Circuit Assen located in Assen, Netherlands.

== 500 cc race report ==
Wayne Gardner is back for the first time since the Laguna crash that broke his leg. Kevin Schwantz gets 5 poles in a row, with Wayne Rainey second on the line. Green light and it's Schwantz, Rainey, Pierfrancesco Chili and Eddie Lawson at the front.

Down the field, Gardner get past Mick Doohan, while Schwantz begins to get a gap. With one lap to go, Schwantz’ Suzuki dies, and Rainey cruises to the win, followed by Lawson and Christian Sarron.

== 500 cc classification ==
Pos.	Rider	Team	Manufacturer	Laps	Time/Retired	Grid	Points
1	(United States) Wayne Rainey	Team Lucky Strike Roberts	Yamaha	20	43:42.080	2	20
2	(United States) Eddie Lawson	Rothmans Kanemoto Honda	Honda	20	+6.970	6	17
3	(France) Christian Sarron	Sonauto Gauloises Blondes Yamaha Mobil 1	Yamaha	20	+9.840	4	15
4	(Australia) Kevin Magee	Team Lucky Strike Roberts	Yamaha	20	+22.110	5	13
5	(Italy) Pierfrancesco Chili	HB Honda Gallina Team	Honda	20	+30.080	3	11
6	(Australia) Wayne Gardner	Rothmans Honda Team	Honda	20	+30.320	9	10
7	(United Kingdom) Ron Haslam	Suzuki Pepsi Cola	Suzuki	20	+31.110	7	9
8	(United Kingdom) Niall Mackenzie	Marlboro Yamaha Team Agostini	Yamaha	20	+49.550	12	8
9	(Australia) Mick Doohan	Rothmans Honda Team	Honda	20	+55.840	13	7
10	(United Kingdom) Rob McElnea	Cabin Racing Team	Honda	20	+1:25.430	14	6
11	(United States) Randy Mamola	Cagiva Corse	Cagiva	20	+2:04.960	10	5
12	(Italy) Alessandro Valesi	Team Iberia	Yamaha	19	+1 Lap	15	4
13	(United States) Freddie Spencer	Marlboro Yamaha Team Agostini	Yamaha	19	+1 Lap	8	3
14	(Switzerland) Marco Gentile	Fior Marlboro	Fior	19	+1 Lap	18	2
15	(Netherlands) Cees Doorakkers	HRK Motors	Honda	19	+1 Lap	22	1
16	(Switzerland) Bruno Kneubühler	Romer Racing Suisse	Honda	19	+1 Lap	23	
17	(West Germany) Michael Rudroff	HRK Motors	Honda	19	+1 Lap	26	
18	(Italy) Michele Valdo		Honda	19	+1 Lap	25	
19	(United Kingdom) Simon Buckmaster	Racing Team Katayama	Honda	19	+1 Lap	17	
20	(Italy) Marco Papa	Team Greco	Paton	19	+1 Lap	21	
21	(West Germany) Petr Schleef	Schuh Racing Team	Honda	18	+2 Laps	35	
22	(West Germany) Martin Troesch		Honda	18	+2 Laps	33	
23	(Switzerland) Nicholas Schmassman	FMS	Honda	18	+2 Laps	29	
24	(Switzerland) Felix Beck	FMS	Honda	18	+2 Laps	30	
25	(West Germany) Alois Meyer	Rallye Sport	Honda	18	+2 Laps	36	
Ret	(Czechoslovakia) Pavol Dekánek		Honda		Retirement	34	
Ret	(Luxembourg) Andreas Leuthe	Librenti Corse	Suzuki		Retirement	31	
Ret	(Austria) Josef Doppler		Honda		Retirement	27	
Ret	(Austria) Karl Truchsess		Honda		Retirement	24	
Ret	(United States) Kevin Schwantz	Suzuki Pepsi Cola	Suzuki		Retirement	1	
Ret	(Spain) Juan Lopez Mella	Club Motocross Pozuelo	Honda		Retirement	32	
Ret	(Belgium) Stephane Mertens		Honda		Retirement	16	
Ret	(Sweden) Peter Linden	Team Heukeroff	Honda		Retirement	19	
Ret	(Republic of Ireland) Eddie Laycock		Honda		Retirement	20	
DNS	(France) Dominique Sarron	Team ROC Elf Honda	Honda		Did not start	11	
DNS	(France) Rachel Nicotte		Chevallier Yamaha		Did not start	28	
DNQ	(Spain) Francisco Gonzales	Club Motocross Pozuelo	Honda		Did not qualify		
DNQ	(United Kingdom) Ian Pratt	Racing Team Katayama	Honda		Did not qualify		
DNQ	(Republic of Ireland) Tony Carey	Spondon	Spondon Yamaha		Did not qualify		

Previous race: 1989 Yugoslavian Grand Prix	FIM Grand Prix World Championship; 1989 season	Next race: 1989 Belgian Grand Prix
Previous race: 1988 Dutch TT	Dutch TT	Next race: 1990 Dutch TT
