= 1989 Grand Prix motorcycle racing season =

Sports season

1989 F.I.M. Grand Prix motorcycle racing season

Seasons
- ← 1988 1990 →

1989 World Champions

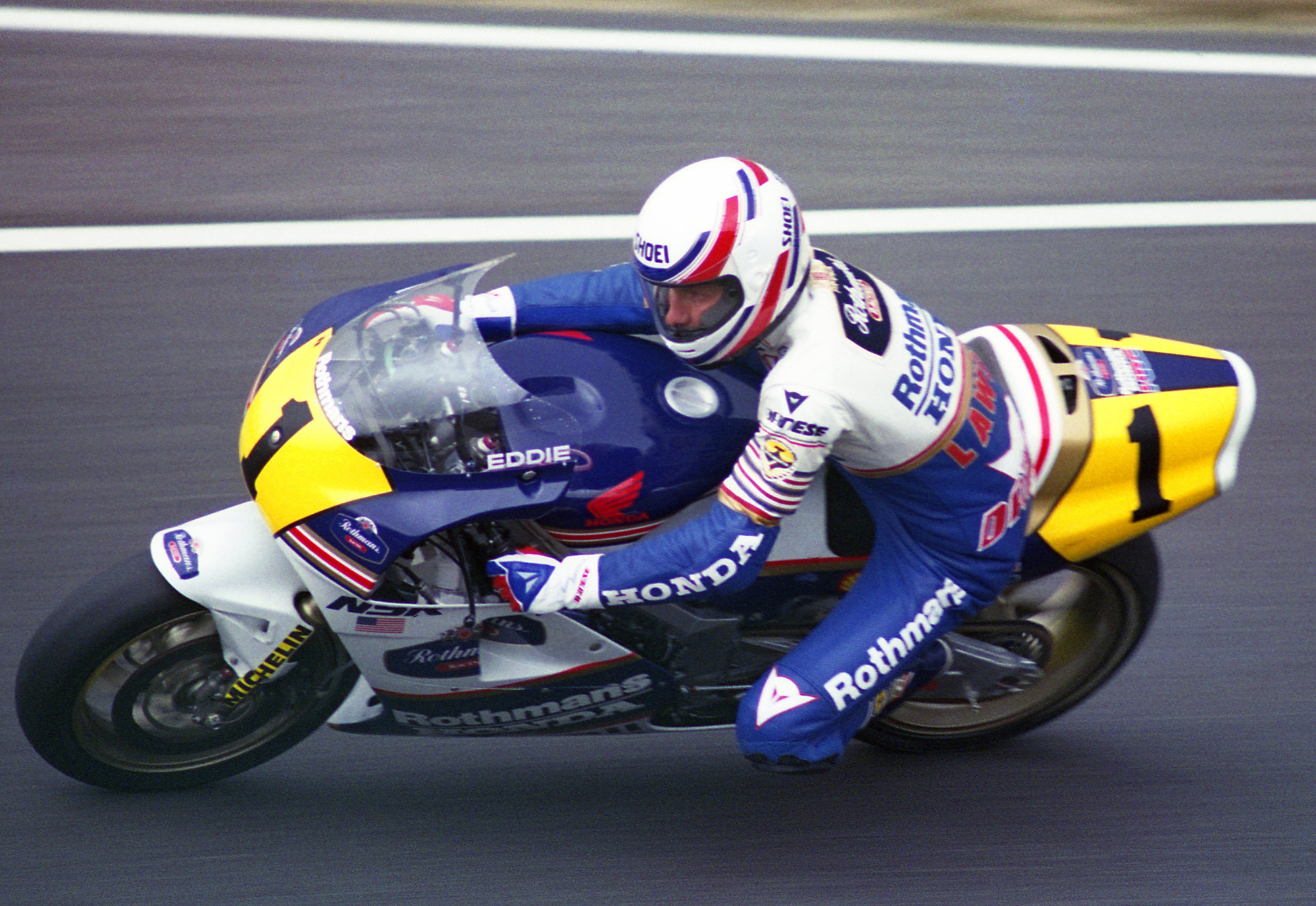
Eddie Lawson (pictured at Suzuka) became the 500cc world champion

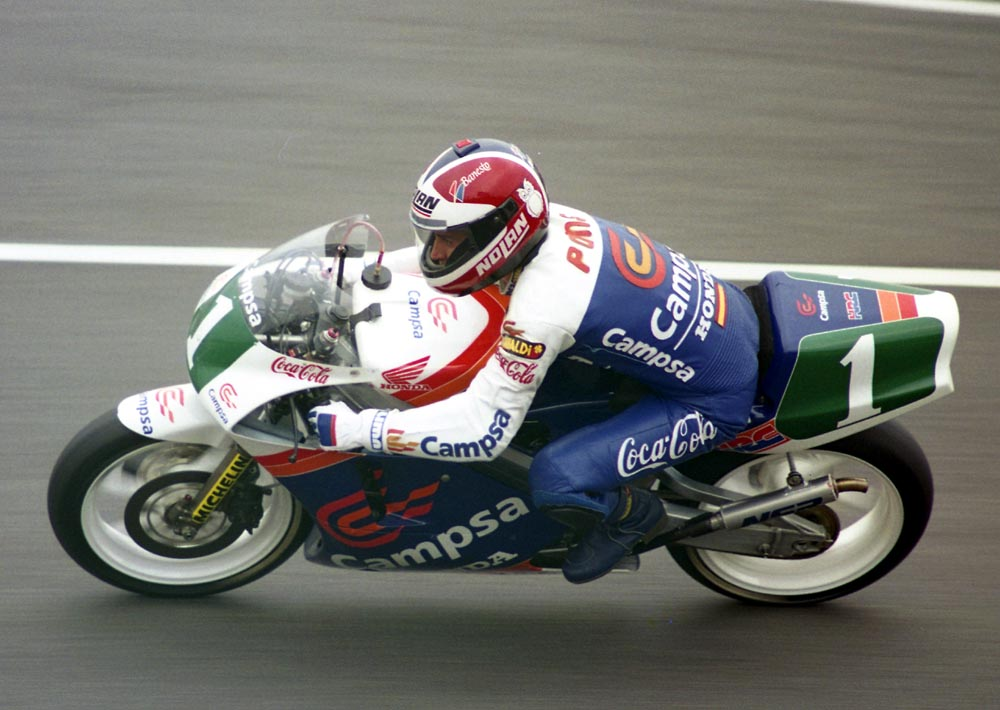
Sito Pons (pictured at Suzuka) became the 250cc world champion

The 1989 Grand Prix motorcycle racing season was the 41st F.I.M. Road Racing World Championship season.

== Season summary ==
Defending champion Eddie Lawson stunned most observers by switching from the Yamaha to Honda in the offseason then proceeded to win the championship, becoming the first man to win two consecutive 500cc championships on two different brands. On why he left Yamaha for Honda: "Giacomo Agostini, the Marlboro Yamaha team manager, started playing games, saying stuff like, 'I don't know if we can pay you the same as we did in 1988.' I'd just won my third title, so that was tough to hear. Also, I found out Ago was talking to Kevin Schwantz. I met with Erv and told him that I needed a change. When Marlboro discovered I was talking with Honda, they doubled their offer, but it was too late. I actually took a pay cut to ride the Honda."

Wayne Rainey and Kevin Schwantz continued to perform impressively while Freddie Spencer made a less than successful comeback attempt with the Marlboro Yamaha team. Australian Wayne Gardner was out for most of the season after breaking his leg at Laguna Seca but not before winning the inaugural Grand Prix in his home country. Another Australian made his Grand Prix debut for the Rothmans Honda team with Mick Doohan scoring a third-place finish at the Hockenheimring. The FIM awarded half points for the rain-drenched Belgian Grand Prix after organisers restarted the race three times contrary to FIM race regulations. The Nations Grand Prix at Misano was boycotted by most of the top riders for safety reasons.

Sito Pons won a second consecutive 250 championship for Honda while Spanish teenager, Àlex Crivillé won the 125 crown on a Rotax-powered JJ Cobas motorcycle designed by Antonio Cobas. Derbi rider Manuel Herreros had the honor of winning the final 80cc world championship as the class would be discontinued after 1989.

As of 2025, this was the last time Honda and the same engine manufacturer won the MotoGP and Formula One double world manufacturer's titles in the same year to date.

== 1989 Grand Prix season calendar ==
The following Grands Prix were scheduled to take place in 1989:

Round	Date	Grand Prix	Circuit
1	26 March	Grand Prix of Japan	Suzuka Circuit
2	9 April	(Australia) Swan Premium Australian Motorcycle Grand Prix	Phillip Island Grand Prix Circuit
3	16 April	(United States) Dunlop USGP	Laguna Seca Raceway
4	30 April	(Spain) Marlboro Gran Premio de España de Motociclismo	Circuito Permanente de Jerez
5	14 May	(Italy) G.P. Delle Nazioni	Circuito Internazionale Santa Monica
6	28 May	(Germany) Großer Preis von Deutschland für Motorräder	Hockenheimring
7	4 June	(Austria) Großer Preis von Österreich	Salzburgring
8	11 June	(Socialist Federal Republic of Yugoslavia) Yu Grand Prix	Automotodrom Rijeka
9	24 June	(Netherlands) Dutch TT	TT Circuit Assen
10	2 July	Belgium Motorcycle Grand Prix	Circuit de Spa-Francorchamps
11	16 July	Grand Prix de France	Bugatti Circuit
12	6 August	(United Kingdom) Shell British Motorcycle Grand Prix	Donington Park
13	13 August	(Sweden) Swedish TT	Scandinavian Raceway
14	27 August	(Czechoslovakia) Grand Prix CSSR-Brno	Brno Circuit
15	17 September	(Brazil) Brazilian Grand Prix	Autódromo Internacional de Goiânia

=== Calendar changes ===
- The Australian Grand Prix was added to the calendar.
- The Expo 92 Grand Prix was taken off the calendar, as well as the Jarama circuit.
- The Nations Grand Prix moved from the Imola circuit to the Circuito Internazionale Santa Monica.
- The German Grand Prix moved from the Nürburgring to the Hockenheimring.
- The French Grand Prix moved from the Paul Ricard circuit to the Bugatti Circuit in Le Mans.

== Participants ==
=== 500cc participants ===
Team	Constructor	Motorcycle	No.	Rider	Rounds
Team Rothmans/Kanemoto Honda	Honda	Honda NSR500	1	(United States) Eddie Lawson	1–4, 6–15
Rothmans Honda/HRC	Honda	Honda NSR500	2	(Australia) Wayne Gardner	1–3, 9–13, 15
Rothmans Honda/HRC	Honda	Honda NSR500	17	(United Kingdom) Roger Burnett	12
Rothmans Honda/HRC	Honda	Honda NSR500	27	(Australia) Mick Doohan	1–11, 15
Team Lucky Strike Roberts	Yamaha	Yamaha YZR500	3	(United States) Wayne Rainey	1–4, 6–15
Team Lucky Strike Roberts	Yamaha	Yamaha YZR500	5	(Australia) Kevin Magee	1–3, 6–15
Team Lucky Strike Roberts	Yamaha	Yamaha YZR500	26	(Japan) Norihiko Fujiwara	1
Team Roberts	Yamaha	Yamaha YZR500	49	(United States) John Kocinski	10
Team Gauloises Blondes Mobil 1	Yamaha	Yamaha YZR500	4	(France) Christian Sarron	1–4, 6–15
Marlboro Yamaha Team Agostini	Yamaha	Yamaha YZR500	6	(United Kingdom) Niall Mackenzie	1–4, 6, 8–15
Marlboro Yamaha Team Agostini	Yamaha	Yamaha YZR500	19	(United States) Freddie Spencer	1–4, 6–11
Marlboro Yamaha Team Agostini	Yamaha	Yamaha YZR500	53	(Italy) Luca Cadalora	12
Marlboro Yamaha Team Agostini	Yamaha	Yamaha YZR500	25	(Italy) Alberto Rota	14
Team Elf Honda/ROC	Honda	Honda NSR500	7	(France) Dominique Sarron	1–4, 6–8, 12, 15
Team Elf Honda/ROC	Honda	Honda NSR500	55; 56	(France) Adrien Morillas	11, 13–15
Team Pepsi Suzuki	Suzuki	Suzuki RGV500	8	(United Kingdom) Ron Haslam	1–4, 6–9, 12–15
Team Pepsi Suzuki	Suzuki	Suzuki RGV500	34	(United States) Kevin Schwantz	All
Schick Advantage Suzuki	Suzuki	Suzuki RGV500	42	(Japan) Osamu Hiwatashi	1
Team Suzuki Deutschland	Suzuki	Suzuki RGV500	50	(Germany) Ernst Gschwender	6
Minolta Suzuki France	Suzuki	Suzuki RGV500	33	(France) Thierry Crine	11
HB Honda Gallina Team	Honda	Honda NSR500	9	(Italy) Pierfrancesco Chili	All
HB Honda Gallina Team	Honda	Honda NSR500	33; 84	(United States) Fred Merkel	5, 11–12
Cabin Racing Team	Honda	Honda NSR500	10	(United Kingdom) Rob McElnea	6–15
Cabin Racing Team	Honda	Honda NSR500	25	(United States) Bubba Shobert	1–3
Cagiva Corse	Cagiva	Cagiva C589	12	(United States) Randy Mamola	1–4, 6–11, 14–15
Cagiva Corse	Cagiva	Cagiva C589	29	(Italy) Massimo Broccoli	4–6
Cagiva Corse	Cagiva	Cagiva C589	29	(France) Raymond Roche	11
HRK Motors	Honda	Honda RS500	14	(West Germany) Michael Rudroff	2–9, 14
HRK Motors	Honda	Honda RS500	54; 56	(Netherlands) Cees Doorakkers	9–12, 14
Team Iberna	Yamaha	Yamaha YZR500	15	(Italy) Alessandro Valesi	All
Team Greco - Paton	Paton	Paton V115 500	16	(Italy) Marco Papa	4–5, 8–12, 14
Tech-21/Team Yamaha	Yamaha	Yamaha YZR500	21	(Japan) Tadahiko Taira	1–4, 13–14
Tech-21/Team Yamaha	Yamaha	Yamaha YZR500	26	(Japan) Norihiko Fujiwara	5–6
Nescafe Can RT Yamaha	Yamaha	Yamaha YZR500	48	(Japan) Kunio Machii	1
Römer Racing Switzerland	Honda	Honda RS500	24	(Switzerland) Bruno Kneubühler	3–4, 6–14
Marlboro Fior Team	Fior	Fior C89	32	(Switzerland) Marco Gentile	1–12
Racing Team Katayama	Honda	Honda RS500	35; 46; 36	(United Kingdom) Simon Buckmaster	All
Racing Team Katayama	Honda	Honda RS500	44	(United Kingdom) Ian Pratt	4, 12
Racing Team Katayama	Honda	Honda RS500	54	(Italy) Fabio Biliotti	11–14
Team Doppler	Honda	Honda RS500	35	(Austria) Josef Doppler	4–7, 9–10, 12, 14
Racing Team Librenti Corse	Librenti Suzuki	Librenti 500; Suzuki RG 500	36; 37	(Luxembourg) Andy Leuthe	4–5, 8–9, 11–14
Dr. Browns Racing	Suzuki	Suzuki RG 500	48	(United States) Eugene Brown	3
Vincenzo Cascino	Suzuki	Suzuki RG 500	32; 53	(Italy) Vincenzo Cascino	3, 6, 14–15
Harry Heutmerkers	Suzuki	Suzuki RG 500 Bakker	39	(Netherlands) Harry Heutmerkers	14
Torbjorn Bastiansen	Suzuki	Suzuki RGB 500	50	(Norway) Torbjorn Bastiansen	13
John Mossey	Suzuki	Suzuki RGB 500	59	(United Kingdom) John Mossey	12
MotoDepot	Suzuki	Suzuki RG 500 Gamma	51	(France) Jean Paul Lecointe	11
Fernando Gonzalez	Honda	Honda RS500	40; 33	(Spain) Fernando González de Nicolás	1–8, 10–12, 14–15
Club Moto Cross Pozuelo	Honda	Honda RS500	41; 30	(Spain) Juan López Mella	4–7, 9, 11–15
Team Schmassmann	Honda	Honda RS500	36; 56; 38	(Switzerland) Niggi Schmassman	2–15
Yamaha Racing Australia	Yamaha	Yamaha YZR500	42	(Australia) Michael Dowson	2
HRC	Honda	Honda NSR500	11	(Japan) Shunji Yatsushiro	1
HRC	Honda	Honda NSR500	40	(Japan) Shinichi Ito	1
HRC	Honda	Honda NSR500	41	(Japan) Hikaru Miyagi	1
HRC	Honda	Honda NSR500	41	(Australia) Malcolm Campbell	2
Millar Racing	Honda	Honda RS500	93	(Republic of Ireland) Eddie Laycock	9–12
Rob Holden Racing	Honda	Honda RS500	51	(New Zealand) Rob Holden	12
Uvex	Manhattan Honda	Honda RS500 Bakker	30; 33	(Austria) Rudolf Zeller	7, 14
Wernberger	Honda	Honda RS500 Bakker	41	(Czechoslovakia) Pavol Dekánek	10, 14
Plaisir - Jacadi Racing	Chevallier Honda	Honda RS500	44	(France) Rachel Nicotte	6, 9
Rallye Sport	Honda	Honda RS500	30	(Germany) Alois Meyer	6–7, 9, 14
Rallye Sport	Honda	Honda RS500	16	(Germany) Helmut Schutz	6, 8

Key
Regular Rider
Wildcard Rider
Replacement Rider

=== 250cc participants ===
Team	Constructor	Motorcycle	No.	Rider	Rounds
Campsa Honda Team	Honda	Honda NSR250	1	(Spain) Sito Pons	All
Ducados Yamaha Team	Yamaha	Yamaha YZR 250	2	(Spain) Joan Garriga	All
Team Lucky Strike Elf	Honda	Honda NSR250	3	(Switzerland) Jacques Cornu	All
Aprilia Racing Team	Aprilia-Rotax	Aprilia AF1	4	(Belgium) Didier de Radiguès	All
Aprilia Racing Team	Aprilia-Rotax	Aprilia AF1	18	(Venezuela) Iván Palazzese	2–5
Aprilia	Aprilia-Rotax	Aprilia AF1	59	(Italy) Marcellino Lucchi	6, 9
HB Römer Team	Honda	Honda NSR250	5	(West Germany) Reinhold Roth	All
Marlboro Yamaha Team Agostini	Yamaha	Yamaha YZR 250	6	(Italy) Luca Cadalora	All
Team Gauloises Blondes Yamaha	Yamaha	Yamaha YZR 250	7	(France) Jean-Philippe Ruggia	1–11
Team Repsol Honda	Honda	Honda NSR250	8	(Spain) Carlos Cardús	All
Ajinomoto Honda/HRC	Honda	Honda NSR250	9	(Japan) Masahiro Shimizu	1–7, 9–15
FMV	Honda	Honda RS250R	10	(Venezuela) Carlos Lavado	1-8
Team Rudy Project	Aprilia-Rotax	Aprilia AF1	10	(Venezuela) Carlos Lavado	9–15
Team Rudy Project	Aprilia-Rotax	Aprilia AF1	31	(Italy) Fabio Barchitta	1–6
HB CR1 Racing Team Honda	Honda	Honda NSR250	13	(Italy) Loris Reggiani	1–4, 6–12, 15
Team Hein Gericke	Aprilia-Rotax	Aprilia AF1	14	(West Germany) Martin Wimmer	1–13, 15
Team Hein Gericke	Aprilia-Rotax	Yamaha TZ 250	55; 37	(West Germany) Bernhard Schick	??
Levior	Yamaha	Yamaha TZ 250	15	(West Germany) Manfred Herweh	7, 10, 12–14
Hostettler / SPI	Yamaha	Yamaha TZ 250	16	(Austria) August Auinger	1–14
HB Rallye Sport Team	Honda	Honda NSR250	17	(West Germany) Helmut Bradl	All
Team Yamaha	Yamaha	Yamaha YZR 250	19	(United States) John Kocinski	1, 3
Team Uvex Aprilia Telefix	Aprilia-Rotax	Aprilia AF1	20	(West Germany) Harald Eckl	All
Team Italia	Aprilia-Rotax	Aprilia AF1	21	(Italy) Fausto Ricci	1–4, 7–14
Team Italia	Aprilia-Rotax	Aprilia AF1	52; 54	(Italy) Alberto Rota	14
Team Elit	Aprilia-Rotax	Aprilia AF1	22	(Italy) Renzo Colleoni	4–12, 14–15
SK Vöst	Aprilia-Rotax	Aprilia AF1	23	(Austria) Andy Preining	1–14
Racing Team Katayama	Honda	Honda RS250R	24	(United States) Andy Leisner	??
RTK Lotus Quartz	Honda	Honda NSR250	40; 49	(Spain) Daniel Amatriaín	1–14
Venemotos Racing Team	Yamaha	Yamaha TZ 250	25	(Brazil) Alex Barros	1–3, 5, 7–15
Venemotos Racing Team	Yamaha	Yamaha TZ 250	26	(Venezuela) Luis Lavado	1–2, 10–11, 14–15
Yamaha Racing Team	Yamaha	Yamaha YZR 250	28	(Japan) Toshihiko Honma	1, 11–13
Team Ducados Yamaha Puig	Yamaha	Yamaha TZ 250	30	(Spain) Alberto Puig	All
Samson Sharp Racing	Honda	Honda RS250R	32	(Netherlands) Wilco Zeelenberg	4–14
Docshop Wevamed Racing Team	Yamaha	Yamaha TZ 250	33	(Republic of Ireland) Garry Cowan	All
Docshop Wevamed Racing Team	Yamaha	Yamaha TZ 250	50; 48	(Netherlands) Patrick van den Goorbergh	1–2, 4, 8–14
Team Ciampini	Honda	Honda RS250R	35	(Italy) Stefano Caracchi	3–6, 8–10, 12–14
St Yrian Motos	Yamaha	Yamaha TZ 250	36	(France) Jean Foray	2–5, 7–8, 11, 13–14
Schwabengarage & Reifenzenter Zürn	Honda	Honda RS250R	38; 41	(West Germany) Jochen Schmid	1–8, 11–15
D Gallacher/Bradgate Containers	Yamaha	Yamaha TZ 250	39	(United Kingdom) Kevin Mitchell	1, 4, 7–8, 11–12
Motul Forza Shoei	Yamaha	Yamaha TZ 250	41; 44	(France) Jean-François Baldé	1–3, 5–9, 12–15
Clermont Ferrand	Yamaha	Yamaha TZ 250	43	(France) Adrien Morillas	11, 13–15
Aprilia France	Aprilia-Rotax	Aprilia AF1	45	(France) Alain Bronec	4–8, 10–15
Nava Racing Team	Seel-Yamaha	Yamaha TZ 250	46; 34	(West Germany) Hans Becker	5–13
AGV Pileri LM	Honda	Honda RS250R	51; 59; 45	(Italy) Paolo Casoli	1–2, 4, 11–15
AGV Pileri LM	Honda	Honda RS250R	70; 46; 48; 42	(Italy) Maurizio Vitali	5–14
Swiss Yamaha Team	Yamaha	Yamaha TZ 250	56; 50	(Switzerland) Urs Jücker	5, 8, 14
??	Yamaha	Yamaha TZ 250	57	(Australia) Darren Milner	2
Cabin Racing Honda	Honda	Honda NSR250	58	(Japan) Tadayuki Okada	1
Gazzaniga Corse	Gazzaniga	Gazzaniga 250 GP	60; 46	(Italy) Virginio Ferrari	6–7, 14
Edwin Honda	Honda	Honda NSR250	65	(United States) Jim Filice	1, 3
Yamaha Racing Team	Yamaha	Yamaha YZR 250	57	(Japan) Toshinobu Shiomori	1

Key
Regular Rider
Wildcard Rider
Replacement Rider

== Results and standings ==
=== Grands Prix ===
Round	Date	Race	Location	80cc winner	125cc winner	250cc winner	500cc winner	Report
1	26 March	(Japan) Japanese Grand Prix	Suzuka		(Italy) Ezio Gianola	(United States) John Kocinski	(United States) Kevin Schwantz	Report
2	9 April	(Australia) Australian Grand Prix	Phillip Island		(Spain) Àlex Crivillé	(Spain) Sito Pons	(Australia) Wayne Gardner	Report
3	16 April	United States Grand Prix	Laguna Seca			(United States) John Kocinski	(United States) Wayne Rainey	Report
4	30 April	(Spain) Spanish Grand Prix	Jerez	(Spain) Herri Torrontegui	(Spain) Àlex Crivillé	(Italy) Luca Cadalora	(United States) Eddie Lawson	Report
5	14 May	(Italy) Nations Grand Prix	Misano	(Spain) Jorge Martínez	(Italy) Ezio Gianola	(Spain) Sito Pons	(Italy) Pierfrancesco Chili	Report
6	28 May	(Germany) German Grand Prix	Hockenheim	(West Germany) Peter Öttl	(Spain) Àlex Crivillé	(Spain) Sito Pons	(United States) Wayne Rainey	Report
7	4 June	(Austria) Austrian Grand Prix	Salzburgring		(Netherlands) Hans Spaan	(Spain) Sito Pons	(United States) Kevin Schwantz	Report
8	11 June	(Socialist Federal Republic of Yugoslavia) Yugoslavian Grand Prix	Automotodrom Rijeka	(West Germany) Peter Öttl		(Spain) Sito Pons	(United States) Kevin Schwantz	Report
9	24 June	(Netherlands) Dutch TT	Assen	(West Germany) Peter Öttl	(Netherlands) Hans Spaan	(Germany) Reinhold Roth	(United States) Wayne Rainey	Report
10	2 July	(Belgium) Belgian Grand Prix	Spa		(Netherlands) Hans Spaan	(Switzerland) Jacques Cornu	(United States) Eddie Lawson	Report
11	16 July	(France) French Grand Prix	Le Mans		(Spain) Jorge Martínez	(Spain) Carlos Cardús	(United States) Eddie Lawson	Report
12	6 August	(United Kingdom) British Grand Prix	Donington		(Netherlands) Hans Spaan	(Spain) Sito Pons	(United States) Kevin Schwantz	Report
13	13 August	(Sweden) Swedish Grand Prix	Anderstorp		(Spain) Àlex Crivillé	(Spain) Sito Pons	(United States) Eddie Lawson	Report
14	27 August	(Czechoslovakia) Czechoslovak Grand Prix	Brno	(Spain) Herri Torrontegui	(Spain) Àlex Crivillé	(Germany) Reinhold Roth	(United States) Kevin Schwantz	Report
15	17 September	(Brazil) Brazilian Grand Prix	Goiânia			(Italy) Luca Cadalora	(United States) Kevin Schwantz	Report

=== 500cc riders' standings ===
Scoring system

Points are awarded to the top fifteen finishers. A rider has to finish the race to earn points.

Position	1st	2nd	3rd	4th	5th	6th	7th	8th	9th	10th	11th	12th	13th	14th	15th
Points	20	17	15	13	11	10	9	8	7	6	5	4	3	2	1

Pos	Rider	Team	Machine	JPN (Japan)	AUS (Australia)	USA (United States)	ESP (Spain)	NAT (Italy)	GER (Germany)	AUT (Austria)	YUG (Socialist Federal Republic of Yugoslavia)	NED (Netherlands)	BEL (Belgium)	FRA (France)	GBR (United Kingdom)	SWE (Sweden)	TCH (Czechoslovakia)	BRA (Brazil)	Pts
1	(United States) Eddie Lawson	Rothmans-Kanemoto Honda-HRC	NSR500	3	5	3	1	Ret	2	2	3	2	1	1	2	1	2	2	228
2	(United States) Wayne Rainey	Team Lucky Strike Roberts	YZR500	2	2	1	2	Ret	1	3	2	1	3	3	3	Ret	3	3	210.5
3	(France) Christian Sarron	Sonauto Gauloises-Yamaha	YZR500	7	3	6	4	Ret	5	4	5	3	4	4	5	2	4	8	165.5
4	(United States) Kevin Schwantz	Team Pepsi Suzuki	RGV500	1	Ret	2	Ret	Ret	Ret	1	1	Ret	2	2	1	Ret	1	1	162.5
5	(Australia) Kevin Magee	Team Lucky Strike Roberts	YZR500	5	4	4			7	5	4	4	7	5	6	5	7	6	138.5
6	(Italy) Pierfrancesco Chili	HB Honda Gallina Team	NSR500	Ret	Ret	7	6	1	4	6	9	5	6	6	9	7	5	Ret	122
7	(United Kingdom) Niall Mackenzie	Marlboro Yamaha Team Agostini	YZR500	6	Ret	5	3	Ret	Ret		12	8	10	7	4	4	6	9	103
8	(United Kingdom) Ron Haslam	Team Pepsi Suzuki	RGV500	12	7	Ret	7	Ret	Ret	7	8	7			7	6	8	5	86
9	(Australia) Mick Doohan	Rothmans Honda-HRC	NSR500	Ret	8	8	Ret	Ret	3	8	6	9	8	8				4	81
10	(Australia) Wayne Gardner	Rothmans Honda-HRC	NSR500	4	1	Ret						6	Ret	Ret	Ret	3		7	67
11	(United Kingdom) Rob McElnea	Cabin Racing Team	NSR500					Ret	10	11	11	10	11	9	10	9	12	12	52.5
12	(United Kingdom) Simon Buckmaster	Racing Team Katayama	RS500		12	13	13	2	14	13	14	19	15	14	15	12	21	14	43.5
13	(Italy) Alessandro Valesi	Team Iberna	YZR500	Ret	11	11	10	Ret	13	12	Ret	12	Ret	13	Ret	11	14	13	40
14	(Japan) Tadahiko Taira	Tech-21/Team Yamaha	YZR500	8	6	Ret	8									10	9		39
15	(France) Dominique Sarron	Team Elf Honda/ROC	NSR500	18	10	10	9	Ret	8	10	10				Ret			Ret	39
16	(United States) Freddie Spencer	Marlboro Yamaha Team Agostini	YZR500	14	Ret		5	Ret	9	9	Ret	13	9	Ret					33.5
17	(Switzerland) Marco Gentile	Marlboro Fior Team	Fior C89	20	13	12	12	4	Ret	14	Ret	14	12	Ret	13				33
18	(United States) Randy Mamola	Cagiva Corse	C589	16	Ret	Ret	Ret	Ret	12	Ret	7	11	23	11			11	11	33
19	(France) Adrien Morillas	Team Elf Honda/ROC	NSR500											10		8	10	10	26
20	(Germany) Michael Rudroff	HRK Motors	RS500		15	15	20	3	21	19	15	17					20		18
21	(Japan) Norihiko Fujiwara	Tech-21/Team Yamaha	YZR500	9				Ret	6										17
22	(United States) Bubba Shobert	Cabin Racing Team	NSR500	11	Ret	9													12
23	(Austria) Josef Doppler	Team Doppler	RS500				18	5	22	16		Ret	16		21		24		11
24	(Germany) Alois Mayer	Rallye Sport	RS500					6	Ret	Ret		25							10
25	(Italy) Romolo Balbi		RS500					7											9
26	(Spain) Fernando González de Nicolás	Fernando González	RS500	23	Ret	16	Ret	8	DNQ	22	19	DNQ	21	24	22	DNQ	25	16	8
27	(Italy) Luca Cadalora	Marlboro Yamaha Team Agostini	YZR500												8				8
28	(Italy) Massimo Broccoli	Cagiva Corse	C589				11	Ret			13								8
29	(Switzerland) Niggi Schmassman	Team Schmassmann	RS500		14	Ret	Ret	10	Ret	21	20	23	19	21	Ret	16	Ret	17	8
30	(Australia) Michael Dowson	Yamaha Racing Australia	YZR500		9														7
31	(Luxembourg) Andreas Leuthe	Racing Team Librenti Corse	Librenti 500/ RG500				Ret	9	DNQ		Ret	Ret		Ret	20	Ret	23		7
32	(Japan) Shinichi Ito	Honda HRC	NSR500	10															6
33	(Italy) Fabio Biliotti	Racing Team Katayama	RS500											15	14	13	19		6
34	(Switzerland) Bruno Kneubühler	Römer Racing Switzerland	RS500			14	16	Ret	15	15	16	16	17	17	18	14	18		6
35	(United States) John Kocinski	Team Roberts	YZR500										5						5.5
36	(Germany) Ernst Gschwender	Team Suzuki Deutschland	RGV500						11										5
37	(United Kingdom) Roger Burnett	Rothmans Honda-HRC	NSR500												12				4
38	(France) Thierry Crine	Minolta Suzuki France	RGV500											12					4
39	(Spain) Juan Manuel Lopez Mella	Club Moto Cross Pozuelo	RS500				14	Ret	19	Ret		Ret		18	Ret	15	16	15	4
40	(Italy) Alberto Rota	Marlboro Yamaha Team Agostini	YZR500														13		3
41	(Japan) Shunji Yatsushiro	Honda HRC	NSR500	13															3
42	(Netherlands) Cees Doorakkers	HRK Motors	RS500									15	13	25	Ret		Ret		2.5
43	(Republic of Ireland) Eddie Laycock	Millar Racing	RS500				15					Ret	14	16	DNQ		17		2
44	(Japan) Kunio Machii	Nescafe Can RT Yamaha	YZR500	15															1
45	(Sweden) Peter Linden	Team Heukeroff	RS500						23			Ret				Ret	15		1
46	(Germany) Hansjoerg Butz		RS500						16										0
47	(Italy) Marco Papa	Team Greco-Paton	V115 500				Ret	Ret	DNQ		17	20	18	Ret	16		Ret		0
48	(Japan) Shinji Katayama	Yamaha	YZR500	17															0
49	(Chile) Vincenzo Cascino	Vincenzo Cascino	RG500			17			DNQ								26	Ret	0
50	(France) Claude Albert		RG500				17							19	19				0
51	(France) Rachel Nicotte	Plaisir-Jacadi Racing	RS500						17						Ret	Ret			0
52	(Germany) Georg Jung		RS500						Ret	17									0
53	(New Zealand) Robert Holden	Robert Holden Racing	RS500												17				0
54	(Finland) Timo Paavilainen		RG500													17			0
55	(Italy) Vittorio Scatola		RG500					Ret	18		Ret			DNQ					0
56	(Germany) Stefan Klabacher		RS500					Ret	24	18	18						22		0
57	(Italy) Michele Valdo		RS500									18							0
58	(Japan) Katsunori Shinozaki	Suzuki	RGV500	19															0
59	(United Kingdom) Steve Williams		YZR500				19												0
60	(Germany) Peter Schleef		RS500						20			21							0
61	(Austria) Karl Dauer		RS500						Ret	20							Ret		0
62	(Germany) Hans Klingebiel		RS500						26	25			20						0
63	(France) Jean-Paul Lecointe	MotoDepot	RG500											20					0
64	(Japan) Keiji Kinoshita		RS500	21															0
65	(United Kingdom) Ian Pratt	Racing Team Katayama	RS500				21					DNQ			Ret	DNQ			0
66	(Austria) Rudolf Zeller	Uvex Manhattan Honda	Bakker RS500							24	21						27		0
67	(Japan) Kenmei Matsumoto		RS500	22															0
68	(France) Fabian Pilloud		RS500				22												0
69	(Germany) Martin Trosch		RS500						Ret			22							0
70	(United Kingdom) Mark Phillips		RG500										22		Ret				0
71	(France) Pascal Seguela		RS500											22					0
72	(Czechoslovakia) Pavol Dekánek	Wernberger	RS500							23		Ret	Ret				28		0
73	(France) Bernard Gitton	Fior	Fior C89											23					0
74	(United Kingdom) Peter Graves		RS500												23				0
75	(Switzerland) Felix Beck		RS500									24							0
76	(Germany) Helmut Schutz	Rallye Sport	RS500						25		DNQ						Ret		0
77	(Austria) Anton Berghammer		RG500							26									0
78	(Italy) Dario Marchetti		RS500														29		0
79	(Netherlands) Harry Heutmekers	Harry Heutmekers	RG500														30		0
80	(Austria) Michael Kaplan		RS500								Ret						31		0
81	(United Kingdom) Alan Carter		RS500												Ret	Ret			0
82	(United States) Fred Merkel	HB Honda Gallina Team	RS500					Ret						11					5
83	(United States) Doug Polen	Suzuki	RGV500	Ret															0
84	(Japan) Hikaru Miyagi	Honda HRC	NSR500	Ret															0
85	(Japan) Norio Iobe	Honda HRC	RS500	Ret															0
86	(Japan) Osamu Hiwatashi	Schick Advantage Suzuki	RGV500	Ret															0
87	(Australia) Greg Drew	PRP	PRP		Ret														0
88	(Australia) James Judd		YZR500		Ret														0
89	(Australia) Malcolm Campbell	Honda HRC	RS500		Ret														0
90	(United States) Eugene Brown	Dr. Browns Racing	RG500			Ret													0
91	(Venezuela) Larry Moreno Vacondio		RG500				DNQ	Ret		DNQ					DNQ				0
92	(France) Raymond Roche	Cagiva Corse	C589					Ret						Ret					0
93	(Germany) Roland Busch		RS500						Ret										0
94	(Austria) Karl Truchsess		RG500									Ret							0
95	(Belgium) Stephane Mertens		RS500									Ret							0
96	(France) Bernard Andrault		RS500											Ret					0
97	(France) Patrick Leruste	Fior	Fior C89											Ret					0
98	(France) Patrick Salles	Fior	Fior C89											Ret					0
99	(United Kingdom) David Crampton		RG500												Ret				0
100	(United Kingdom) John Mossey	John Mossey	RG500												Ret				0
101	(Norway) Torbjorn Bastiansen	Torbjorn Bastiansen	RG500													Ret			0

=== 250cc standings ===
Place	Rider	Number	Country	Team	Machine	Points	Wins
1	(Spain) Sito Pons	1	Spain	Campsa-Honda	NSR250	262	7
2	(Germany) Reinhold Roth	5	Germany	HB Römer-Honda	NSR250	190	2
3	(Switzerland) Jacques Cornu	3	Switzerland	Lucky Strike Elf-Honda	NSR250	187	1
4	(Spain) Carlos Cardús	8	Spain	Repsol-Honda	NSR250	162	1
5	(Italy) Luca Cadalora	6	Italy	Marlboro Yamaha-Agostini	YZR250	127	2
6	(Japan) Masahiro Shimizu	9	Japan	Ajinomoto-Honda	NSR250	116	0
7	(France) Jean-Philippe Ruggia	7	France	Gauloises Blondes-Yamaha	YZR250	110	0
8	(Spain) Juan Garriga	2	Spain	Ducados-Yamaha	YZR250	98	0
9	(Germany) Helmut Bradl	17	Germany	HB Rallye Sport-Honda	NSR250	88	0
10	(Germany) Martin Wimmer	14	Germany	Hein Gericke-Aprilia	RS250	62	0
11	Loris Reggiani					52	
12	Didier De Radigues					51	
13	Wilco Zeelenberg					41	
14	John Kocinski					40	
15	Toshihiko Honma					36	
16	Jochen Schmid					36	
17	Carlos Lavado					31	
18	Alex Barros					30	
19	Garry Cowan					25	
20	Jim Filice					22	
21	Renzo Colleoni					21	
22	Ivan Palazzese					19	
23	Alberto Puig					18	
24	Harald Eckl					18	
25	Marcellino Lucchi					17	
26	Daniel Amatriain					14	
27	Alain Bronec					11	
28	Tadayuki Okada					10	
29	Toshinobu Shiomori					9	
30	Jose Morillas					9	
31	Stefano Caracchi					9	
32	Fausto Ricci					8	
33	Alberto Rota					6	
34	Patrick van den Goorbergh					6	
35	Daryl Beattie					4	
36	Kevin Mitchell					4	
37	Paolo Casoli					4	
38	Andy Preining					4	
39	Maurizio Vitali					2	
40	Luis Lavado					2	
41	Junya Arai					1	
41	Harald Becker					1	
41	Manfred Herweh					1	
41	August Auinger					1	

=== 125cc standings ===
Place	Rider	Number	Country	Machine	Points	Wins
1	(Spain) Àlex Crivillé	28	Spain	JJ Cobas	166	5
2	(Netherlands) Hans Spaan	3	Netherlands	Honda	152	4
3	(Italy) Ezio Gianola	2	Italy	Honda	138	2
4	(Japan) Hisashi Unemoto	11	Japan	Honda	104	
5	(Italy) Fausto Gresini	22	Italy	Aprilia	102	
6	(Japan) Koji Takada	18	Japan	Honda	99	
7	(West Germany) Stefan Prein	8	West Germany	Honda	92	
8	(Spain) Julian Miralles	4	Spain	Derbi	90	
9	(Spain) Jorge Martínez	1	Spain	Derbi	72	1
10	(United States) Alan Scott	12	United States	Honda	54	
11	Adi Stadler				53	
12	Robin Milton				46	
13	Luis Miguel Reyes				35	
14	Domenico Brigaglia				34	
15	Dirk Raudies				29	
16	Alfred Waibel				25	
17	Taru Rinne				23	
18	Lucio Pietroniro				22	
19	Bruno Casanova				20	
20	Doriano Romboni				20	
21	Flemming Kistrup				18	
22	Robin Appleyard				18	
23	Thierry Feuz				15	
24	Masayuki Hirose				13	
25	Herri Torrontegui				13	
26	Kenichi Yoshida				11	
27	Jean Claude Selini				11	
28	Masato Shima				10	
29	Corrado Catalano				10	
30	Johnny Wickstroem				10	
31	Yutaka Fujihara				9	
32	Kazuaki Yamashita				8	
33	Hubert Abold				8	
34	Shinichi Fujiyama				7	
35	Kazuja Yamada				6	
36	Gerhard Waibel				6	
37	Mike Leitner				4	
38	Gabriele Debbia				3	
39	Jean Pierre Jeandat				3	
40	Stuart Edwards				3	
42	Bady Hassaine				2	
42	Josef Fischer				2	
44	Alex Bedford				1	
44	Heinz Lüthi				1	
44	Herve Duffard				1	

=== 80cc standings ===
Place	Rider	Number	Country	Machine	Points	Wins
1	(Spain) Manuel Herreros	4	Spain	Derbi	92	
2	(Switzerland) Stefan Dörflinger	3	Switzerland	Krauser GmbH	80	
3	(West Germany) Peter Öttl	5	West Germany	Krauser GmbH	75	3
4	(Spain) Herri Torrontegui		Spain	Krauser GmbH	75	2
5	(Italy) Gabriele Gnani	10	Italy	Gnani	45	
6	(Italy) Paolo Priori		Italy	Krauser GmbH	41	
7	(Bulgaria) Bogdan Nikolov	6	Bulgaria	Krauser GmbH	40	
8	(Spain) Jorge Martínez		Spain	Derbi	35	1
9	(Spain) Jaime Mariano		Spain	Casal	33	
10	(Germany) Jörg Seel		West Germany	Seel	32	
11	Andres Sanchez				30	
12	Julian Miralles				26	
13	Hans Koopman				23	
14	Ralf Waldmann				23	
15	Josè Saez				20	
16	Bernd Völkel				13	
17	Jos Van Dongen				13	
18	Bert Smit				12	
19	Stefan Kurfiss				12	
20	Luis Alvaro				10	
21	Giuseppe Ascareggi				9	
22	Roberto Sassone				7	
23	Janos Szabo				6	
24	Zdravko Matulja				5	
25	Jacques Bernard				5	
26	Janez Pintar				4	
27	Stefan Brägger				4	
28	Thomas Engl				3	
29	Günter Schrinhofer				3	
30	René Dünki				3	
31	Mathias Ehinger				2	
32	Heinz Paschen				1	
33	Xavier Arumi				1	
