= 1989 Spanish motorcycle Grand Prix =

(Spain) 1989 Spanish Grand Prix
Race details
- Race 4 of 15 races in the 1989 Grand Prix motorcycle racing season
- Date: 30 April 1989
- Official name: Marlboro Gran Premio de España de Motociclismo
- Location: Circuito Permanente de Jerez
- Course: Permanent racing facility; 4.428 km (2.751 mi)

500cc
Pole position
- Rider: (United States) Wayne Rainey
- Time: 1:48.640
Fastest lap
- Rider: (United States) Kevin Schwantz
- Time: 1:48.790
Podium
- First: (United States) Eddie Lawson
- Second: (United States) Wayne Rainey
- Third: (United Kingdom) Niall Mackenzie

250cc
Pole position
- Rider: (Italy) Luca Cadalora
- Time: 1:50.520
Fastest lap
- Rider: (Spain) Juan Garriga
- Time: 1:51.080
Podium
- First: (Italy) Luca Cadalora
- Second: (Spain) Sito Pons
- Third: (France) Jean-Philippe Ruggia

125cc
Pole position
- Rider: (Spain) Àlex Crivillé
- Time: 1:56.330
Fastest lap
- Rider: (Spain) Àlex Crivillé
- Time: 1:56.610
Podium
- First: (Spain) Àlex Crivillé
- Second: (Spain) Jorge Martínez
- Third: (Japan) Koji Takada

80cc
Pole position
- Rider: (Switzerland) Stefan Dörflinger
- Time: 2:02.640
Fastest lap
- Rider: Unknown
Podium
- First: (Spain) Herri Torrontegui
- Second: (Switzerland) Stefan Dörflinger
- Third: (West Germany) Peter Öttl

The 1989 Spanish motorcycle Grand Prix was the fourth round of the 1989 Grand Prix motorcycle racing season. It took place on the weekend of 28–30 April 1989 at the Jerez circuit.

== 500 cc race report ==
Wayne Rainey on pole goes into the first turn ahead of Pierfrancesco Chili, Eddie Lawson, and Kevin Schwantz. Schwantz wastes little time in catching and passing Rainey. As Schwantz pulls ahead, Rainey battles Lawson for the first time in the season, Lawson seeming to come to terms with the Honda. Rainey can only watch as Lawson passes and claws away at a gap.

Meanwhile, Chili tries passing Ron Haslam on the hairpin leading into the straight by braking late on the inside. Chili clumsily bumps Haslam, who’s in no mood to be shoved and decides to shove back, taking them both off-track, though Haslam’s detour end up being much longer than Chili’s.

Up ahead, Schwantz is enjoying a large lead with 5 laps to go when he throws it away, clutching his head in disbelief as he walks through the gravel. Lawson is handed the win, followed by Rainey and Mackenzie.

Schwantz:

"At Jerez there was four laps to go and I was almost six seconds in front of Eddie. I had watched the race the previous year after the bike broke and I remembered watching him haul in Rainey and keep Rainey from winning his first Grand Prix. I was thinking to myself, come on you've just got to keep above those five seconds. Get it down to less than five laps with more than five seconds and there's no way he can catch you.' "

"I had got there and done that. I went over the line and around the back of the big Kodak box that is a scoreboard with all the times on it. As I went past the back it changed to show four laps to go and more than five seconds, I thought, 'yeah I've got it,' and immediately fell off. It was just a loss of concentration, I thought I had it in the bag. I went into the corner, didn't have it down on my knee where I needed to be. The front end pushed and before I could even think, 'Oh shit', I was sitting on the haybales."

The gap between Lawson and Rainey is now 10 points.

== 500 cc classification ==
Pos.	Rider	Team	Manufacturer	Laps	Time/Retired	Grid	Points
1	(United States) Eddie Lawson	Rothmans Kanemoto Honda	Honda	30	55:11.260	4	20
2	(United States) Wayne Rainey	Team Lucky Strike Roberts	Yamaha	30	+10.170	1	17
3	(United Kingdom) Niall Mackenzie	Marlboro Yamaha Team Agostini	Yamaha	30	+17.480	3	15
4	(France) Christian Sarron	Sonauto Gauloises Blondes Yamaha Mobil 1	Yamaha	30	+27.300	5	13
5	(United States) Freddie Spencer	Marlboro Yamaha Team Agostini	Yamaha	30	+51.000	6	11
6	(Italy) Pierfrancesco Chili	HB Honda Gallina Team	Honda	30	+1:19.040	8	10
7	(United Kingdom) Ron Haslam	Suzuki Pepsi Cola	Suzuki	30	+1:29.450	10	9
8	(Japan) Tadahiko Taira	Yamaha Motor Company	Yamaha	30	+1:43.440	7	8
9	(France) Dominique Sarron	Team ROC Elf Honda	Honda	30	+1:46.870	12	7
10	(Italy) Alessandro Valesi	Team Iberia	Yamaha	30	+1:53.860	13	6
11	(Italy) Massimo Broccoli	Cagiva Corse	Cagiva	29	+1 Lap	16	5
12	(Switzerland) Marco Gentile	Fior Marlboro	Fior	29	+1 Lap	14	4
13	(United Kingdom) Simon Buckmaster	Racing Team Katayama	Honda	29	+1 Lap	15	3
14	(Spain) Juan Lopez Mella	Club Motocross Pozuelo	Honda	29	+1 Lap	17	2
15	(Republic of Ireland) Eddie Laycock		Honda	29	+1 Lap	21	1
16	(Switzerland) Bruno Kneubuhler	Romer Racing Suisse	Honda	29	+1 Lap	18	
17	(France) Claude Albert		Suzuki	29	+1 Lap	24	
18	(Austria) Josef Doppler		Honda	29	+1 Lap	25	
19	(United Kingdom) Steve Williams	Flower Motorcycles	Honda	29	+1 Lap	22	
20	(West Germany) Michael Rudroff	HRK Motors	Honda	29	+1 Lap	23	
21	(United Kingdom) Ian Pratt	Racing Team Katayama	Honda	29	+1 Lap	27	
22	(France) Fabian Pilloud		Honda	29	+1 Lap	29	
Ret	(Switzerland) Nicholas Schmassman	FMS	Honda		Retirement	20	
Ret	(Luxembourg) Andreas Leuthe	Librenti Corse	Suzuki		Retirement	26	
Ret	(United States) Kevin Schwantz	Suzuki Pepsi Cola	Suzuki		Retirement	2	
Ret	(United States) Randy Mamola	Cagiva Corse	Cagiva		Retirement	9	
Ret	(Spain) Francisco Gonzales	Club Motocross Pozuelo	Honda		Retirement	28	
Ret	(Italy) Marco Papa	Team Greco	Paton		Retirement	19	
Ret	(Australia) Mick Doohan	Rothmans Honda Team	Honda		Retirement	11	
DNQ	(Venezuela) Larry Moreno Vacondio		Suzuki		Did not qualify		

Previous race: 1989 United States Grand Prix	FIM Grand Prix World Championship; 1989 season	Next race: 1989 Nations Grand Prix
Previous race: 1988 Spanish Grand Prix	Spanish motorcycle Grand Prix	Next race: 1990 Spanish Grand Prix
