= 1989 Nations motorcycle Grand Prix =

Motorcycle race in Italy

(Italy) 1989 Nations Grand Prix
Race details
- Race 5 of 15 races in the 1989 Grand Prix motorcycle racing season
- Date: 14 May 1989
- Official name: G.P. Delle Nazioni
- Location: Circuito Internazionale Santa Monica
- Course: Permanent racing facility; 3.488 km (2.167 mi)

500cc
Pole position
- Rider: (United States) Kevin Schwantz
- Time: 1:17.424
Fastest lap
- Rider: (United States) Eddie Lawson
- Time: 1:19.169
Podium
- First: (Italy) Pierfrancesco Chili
- Second: (United Kingdom) Simon Buckmaster
- Third: (Germany) Michael Rudroff

250cc
Pole position
- Rider: (Italy) Luca Cadalora
- Time: 1:19.750
Fastest lap
- Rider: (Spain) Juan Garriga
- Time: 1:20.342
Podium
- First: (Spain) Sito Pons
- Second: (France) Jean-Philippe Ruggia
- Third: (Switzerland) Jacques Cornu

125cc
Pole position
- Rider: (Netherlands) Hans Spaan
- Time: 1:25.530
Fastest lap
- Rider: (Spain) Àlex Crivillé
- Time: 1:25.768
Podium
- First: (Italy) Ezio Gianola
- Second: (Netherlands) Hans Spaan
- Third: (Italy) Fausto Gresini

80cc
Pole position
- Rider: (Switzerland) Stefan Dörflinger
- Time: 1:29.616
Fastest lap
- Rider: (West Germany) Peter Öttl
- Time: 1:30.136
Podium
- First: (Spain) Jorge Martínez
- Second: (Italy) Gabriele Gnani
- Third: (Spain) Herri Torrontegui

The 1989 Nations motorcycle Grand Prix was the fifth race of the 1989 Grand Prix motorcycle racing season. It took place on the weekend of 12–14 May 1989 at the Misano circuit, located near the town of Misano Adriatico (Province of Rimini) in the frazione of Santa Monica-Cella.

== 500cc Race Report ==
Before the race, riders were concerned about the track surface, considering it too slippery, and should it rain, even dangerous.

Dry track and dark clouds for the green light with Kevin Schwantz on pole. Pierfrancesco Chili got a good start and led briefly, then Schwantz, Wayne Rainey and Christian Sarron settled into the lead. Short afterwards, the rain started and Schwantz raised his hand to stop the race.

The top riders had a meeting and decided they wanted a practice session before restarting in the wet, but the request was refused by the race organizers and the riders decided to boycott the race. Eddie Lawson says, "This place is unique in that the track surface is very, very slippery, and when it has water on it you can’t ride on it. All the top riders felt it was too dangerous, and it is, and so we didn’t ride. It’s as simple as that. ... We go to plenty of racetracks where we test all week, in the sunshine, and then it starts to rain; well, we put rain tires on and we race. This place, you can’t do that. Regardless of not testing or anything else, you just can’t ride in the wet, it’s just too dangerous. It was unfortunate."

A notable dissenter is Chili, who wants to race, along with other riders. Chili manages to stay upright in the downpour and wins the race, with Lawson sarcastically cheering from the stands and Sarron blowing a kiss.

== 500cc Classification ==
Pos.	Rider	Team	Manufacturer	Laps	Time/Retired	Grid	Points
1	(Italy) Pierfrancesco Chili	HB Honda Gallina Team	Honda	33	59:21.035	3	20
2	(United Kingdom) Simon Buckmaster	Racing Team Katayama	Honda	33	+32.271	17	17
3	(Germany) Michael Rudroff	HRK Motors	Honda	33	+32.599	24	15
4	(Switzerland) Marco Gentile	Fior Marlboro	Fior	33	+1:32.451	19	13
5	(Austria) Josef Doppler		Honda	33	+1:51.120	25	11
6	(Germany) Alois Meyer	Rallye Sport	Honda	32	+1 Lap	31	10
7	(Italy) Romolo Balbi		Honda	32	+1 Lap	23	9
8	(Spain) Francisco Gonzales	Club Motocross Pozuelo	Honda	32	+1 Lap	32	8
9	(Luxembourg) Andreas Leuthe	Librenti Corse	Suzuki	31	+2 Laps	28	7
10	(Switzerland) Nicholas Schmassman	FMS	Honda	31	+2 Laps	29	6
Ret	(France) Christian Sarron	Sonauto Gauloises Blondes Yamaha Mobil 1	Yamaha		Retirement	5	
Ret	(France) Raymond Roche	Cagiva Corse	Cagiva		Retirement	18	
Ret	(Italy) Alessandro Valesi	Team Iberia	Yamaha		Retirement	15	
Ret	(Japan) Norihiko Fujiwara	Yamaha Motor Company	Yamaha		Retirement	14	
Ret	(United States) Freddie Spencer	Marlboro Yamaha Team Agostini	Yamaha		Retirement	7	
Ret	(United Kingdom) Ron Haslam	Suzuki Pepsi Cola	Suzuki		Retirement	8	
Ret	(United States) Eddie Lawson	Rothmans Kanemoto Honda	Honda		Retirement	2	
Ret	(United States) Wayne Rainey	Team Lucky Strike Roberts	Yamaha		Retirement	4	
Ret	(Spain) Juan Lopez Mella	Club Motocross Pozuelo	Honda		Retirement	21	
Ret	(Italy) Massimo Broccoli	Cagiva Corse	Cagiva		Retirement	16	
Ret	(United States) Kevin Schwantz	Suzuki Pepsi Cola	Suzuki		Retirement	1	
Ret	(United Kingdom) Rob McElnea	Cabin Racing Team	Honda		Retirement	12	
Ret	(Germany) Stefan Klabacher		Honda		Retirement	30	
Ret	(France) Dominique Sarron	Team ROC Elf Honda	Honda		Retirement	13	
Ret	(Italy) Vittorio Scatola		Suzuki		Retirement	22	
Ret	(Venezuela) Larry Moreno Vacondio		Suzuki		Retirement	33	
Ret	(Switzerland) Bruno Kneubühler	Romer Racing Suisse	Honda		Retirement	20	
Ret	(United States) Fred Merkel	HB Honda Gallina Team	Honda		Retirement	10	
Ret	(United Kingdom) Niall Mackenzie	Marlboro Yamaha Team Agostini	Yamaha		Retirement	6	
Ret	(France) Claude Albert		Suzuki		Retirement	5	
Ret	(Italy) Marco Papa	Team Greco	Paton		Retirement	27	
Ret	(United States) Randy Mamola	Cagiva Corse	Cagiva		Retirement	11	
Ret	(Australia) Mick Doohan	Rothmans Honda Team	Honda		Retirement	9	
DNS	(France) Claude Albert		Suzuki		Did not start	26	

Previous race: 1989 Spanish Grand Prix	FIM Grand Prix World Championship; 1989 season	Next race: 1989 German Grand Prix
Previous race: 1988 Nations Grand Prix	Nations Grand Prix	Next race: 1990 Nations Grand Prix
