= Juan López Mella =

Spanish motorcycle racer

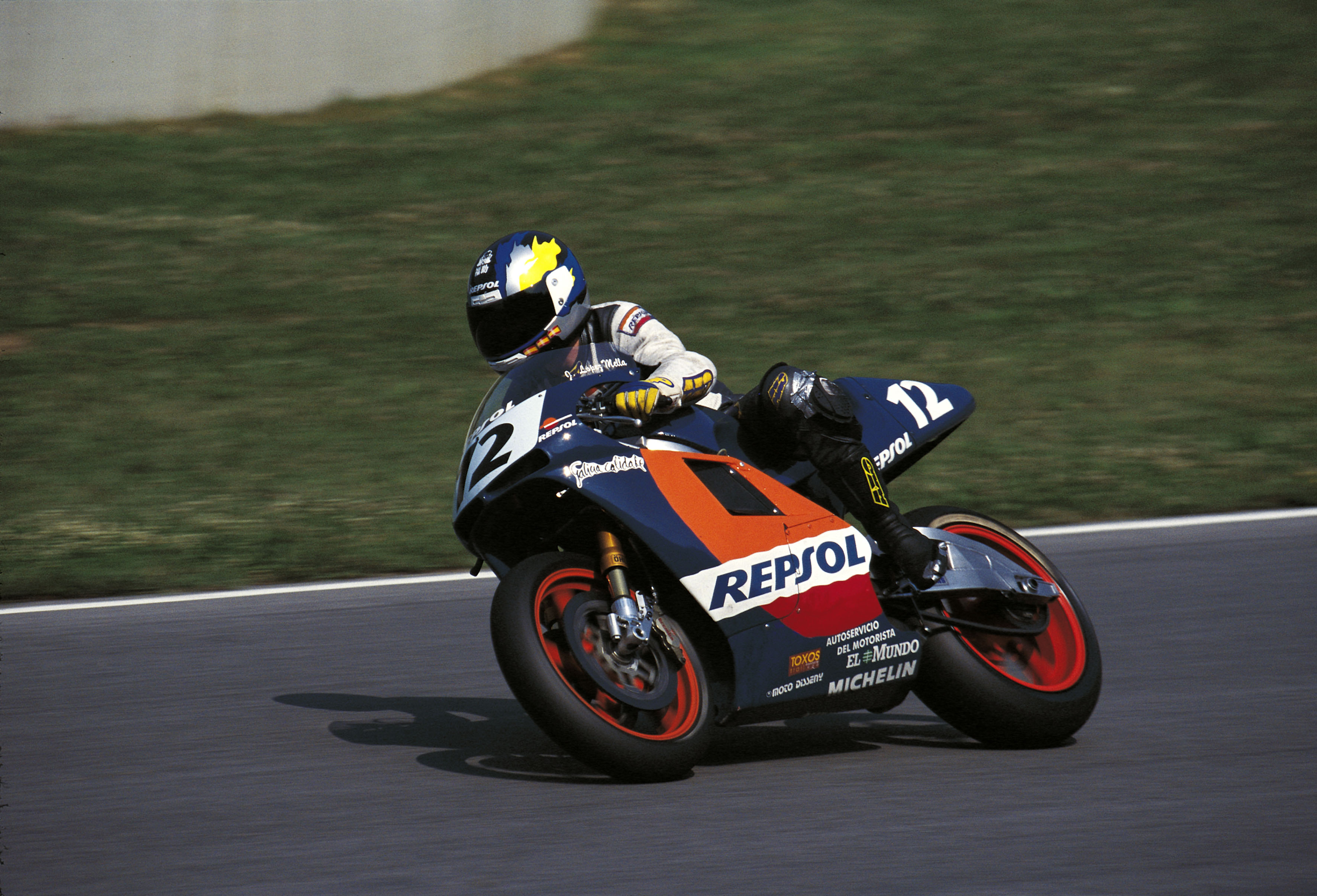
- Juan López Mella, riding his Repsol ROC-Yamaha at the 1994 Italian Grand Prix
- Born: 12 April 1965; Lugo, Spain
- Died: 10 May 1995 (aged 30); Albacete, Spain
Motorcycle racing career statistics
Grand Prix motorcycle racing
Active years	1989, 1992 – 1994
Starts / Wins / Podiums / Poles / F. laps / Points; 40 / 0 / 0 / 0 / 0 / 76
Superbike World Championship
Active years	1990 – 1992
Starts / Wins / Podiums / Poles / F. laps / Points; 33 / 0 / 1 / 0 / 0 / 94

Juan Manuel López Mella (12 April 1965 – 10 May 1995) was a Spanish professional motorcycle racer at Grand Prix and Superbike levels. After coming second in the national championships in 1985, he entered international competitions for the first time in 1987. He was the first person from Galicia to enter the competition. He came third in the 1991 Spanish Superbike race at Jarama, the first person from Spain to gain a podium position in the competition, and was named Spanish Superbike champion in both 1991 and 1992, becoming the highest placed private rider overall in 1993. In 1995, he started riding in the Thunderbike tournament but was killed in a road accident early in the season. Lugo, his city of birth, has named a park that teaches road safety in his honour and hosts a museum in his memory.

== Motorcycling career ==
Born on 12 April 1965 in Lugo, Galicia, Spain, López Mella started his racing career with motocross but by the age of 18 had moved to racing on asphalt. After debuting nationally in the Criterium Solo Moto in 1985, and coming second overall in the junior category of the 250 cc class that year, he then progressed to racing in the World Motorcycle Championships in 1987. He became the first Galacian to compete in a world championship. After a season riding a Yamaha TZ250, during which he scored no points, he moved to a Honda RS250R in 1988; once again he finished outside the championship rankings. At that stage, he decided to move to larger bikes.

In 1989, López Mella raced for the first time in the 500 cc category of the World Motorcycle Championship, with a Honda NS500. He was the first Galacian to compete in the championship, placing at number 40 at the end of the season. Between 1990 and 1992, he competed in the Superbike World Championship, finishing with 33 starts and 99 points over the three seasons. During the 1991 season, he achieved his sole podium placing when he came third in the Spanish round at Jarama with a time of 40:05.859. López Mella was the first Spaniard to achieve a podium place in the championship. He was also the first to cross the finish line on a four-stroke bike at the Superprestigio Super Moto at the Circuit de Barcelona-Catalunya later the that year. He subsequently competed twice in the 1992 Superbike World Championship, coming thirteenth both times. He was named Spanish Superbike champion in both 1991 and 1992.

In 1992, López Mella re-entered in the Grand Prix 500 cc class with a Yamaha YZR500. However, in that year his funding ran out; it was only fund-raising by his now substantial fan base that enabled him to continue to compete. Riding for his own Lopez Mella Racing Team, he entered both the 1993 and 1994 seasons. In 1993, he came twelfth overall, the highest placed amongst the privately sponsored riders. In 1994, he replaced Kevin Schwantz in the Suzuki team for the European motorcycle Grand Prix at Circuit de Barcelona-Catalunya. He came 13th riding a Suzuki RGV500.

== Death and legacy ==
In 1995, López Mella started the season racing in the Thunderbike Trophy, completing the first race at Jerez de la Frontera in fourth place. He expected to complete the year with a good overall score, possibly with a podium position. However, on the evening of 10 May, while riding near Albacete on his way to train at the Circuit de Calafat, his motorbike hit a puddle of water, left the road and crashed. An ambulance was called to take him to the hospital but he died before arriving. His riding companion and girlfriend, Cristina Blanco Trinidad, was also injured but survived. In his honour, Lugo named a park in his name, which opened on 26 May 1995. The park teaches road safety to children. The city also hosts a museum that was created in his memory.

== Career statistics ==
=== Grand Prix motorcycle racing ===
==== Races by year ====
(key) (Races in bold indicate pole position)

Year	Class	Bike	1	2	3	4	5	6	7	8	9	10	11	12	13	14	15	Pos	Pts	Ref
1989	500cc	Honda NS500	JPN	AUS	USA	ESP; 14	NAT; Ret	GER; 19	AUT; Ret	YUG	NED; Ret	BEL	FRA; 18	GBR; Ret	SWE; 15	CZE; 16	BRA; 15	40th	4	
1992	500cc	Yamaha YZR500	JPN	AUS	MAL	SPA; 19	ITA; 18	EUR; 15	GER; 12	NED; DNS	HUN	FRA	GBR	BRA; 13	RSA; DNS			–	0	
1993	500cc	Yamaha YZR500	AUS; Ret	MAL; 13	JPN; Ret	SPA; 8	AUT; 13	GER; 14	NED; Ret	EUR; 7	RSM; Ret	GBR; 7	CZE; 14	ITA; 12	USA; 10	FIM; Ret		12th	46	
1994	500cc	Yamaha YZR500 (exc 14 Suzuki RGV500)	AUS; 13	MAL; Ret	JPN; 15	SPA; 13	AUT; Ret	GER; 12	NED; Ret	ITA; 10	FRA; 10	GBR	CZE; Ret	USA; DNS	ARG; DNS	EUR; 13		16th	26	

=== Superbike World Championship ===
==== Races by year ====
(key) (Races in bold indicate pole position) (Races in italics indicate fastest lap)

Year	Bike	1		2		3		4		5		6		7		8		9		10		11		12		13		Pos.	Pts	Ref
Year	Bike	R1	R2	R1	R2	R1	R2	R1	R2	R1	R2	R1	R2	R1	R2	R1	R2	R1	R2	R1	R2	R1	R2	R1	R2	R1	R2	Pos.	Pts	Ref
1990	Honda VFR750R	SPA; 12	SPA; Ret	GBR; 19	GBR; Ret	HUN; 12	HUN; Ret	GER; 11	GER; Ret	CAN; Ret	CAN; 16	USA	USA	AUT	AUT	JPN	JPN	FRA	FRA	ITA; Ret	ITA; 23	MAL	MAL	AUS	AUS	NZL	NZL	39th	13	
1991	Honda VFR750R	GBR; 11	GBR; 11	SPA; 3	SPA; 4	CAN	CAN	USA; 14	USA	AUT; Ret	AUT; Ret	SMR; Ret	SMR; 11	SWE; Ret	SWE; Ret	JPN; 17	JPN; 18	MAL; 14	MAL; 10	GER	GER	FRA; 16	FRA; 18	ITA; 13	ITA; 15	AUS	AUS	16th	57	
1992	Honda VFR750R	SPA; 14	SPA; 10	GBR; 16	GBR	GER	GER	BEL	BEL	SPA	SPA	AUT	AUT	ITA	ITA	MAL	MAL	JPN	JPN	NED	NED	ITA	ITA	AUS	AUS	NZL	NZL	44th	24	
