= 1989 French motorcycle Grand Prix =

(France) 1989 French Grand Prix
Race details
- Race 11 of 15 races in the 1989 Grand Prix motorcycle racing season
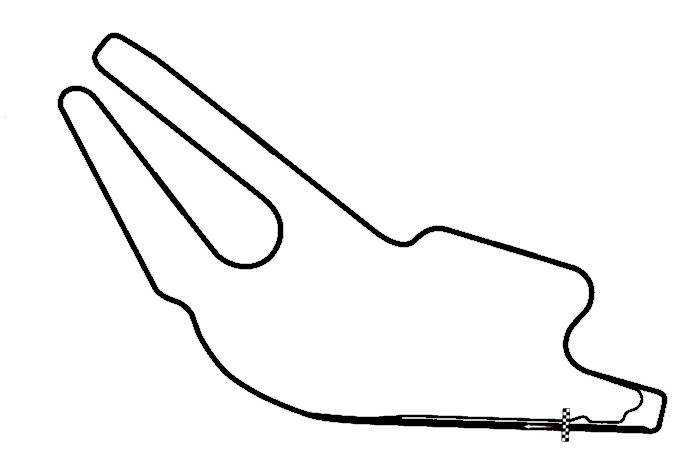
- Date: 16 July 1989
- Official name: Grand Prix de France
- Location: Bugatti Circuit
- Course: Permanent racing facility; 7.004 km (4.352 mi)

500cc
Pole position
- Rider: (United States) Eddie Lawson
- Time: 1:42.330
Fastest lap
- Rider: (United States) Kevin Schwantz
- Time: 1:42.970
Podium
- First: (United States) Eddie Lawson
- Second: (United States) Kevin Schwantz
- Third: (United States) Wayne Rainey

250cc
Pole position
- Rider: (France) Jean-Philippe Ruggia
- Time: 1:46.760
Fastest lap
- Rider: (Spain) Sito Pons
- Time: 1:47.300
Podium
- First: (Spain) Carlos Cardús
- Second: (Switzerland) Jacques Cornu
- Third: (Spain) Sito Pons

125cc
Pole position
- Rider: (Spain) Jorge Martínez
- Time: 1:55.420
Fastest lap
- Rider: (Spain) Jorge Martínez
- Time: 1:55.240
Podium
- First: (Spain) Jorge Martínez
- Second: (Spain) Àlex Crivillé
- Third: (Italy) Ezio Gianola

The 1989 French motorcycle Grand Prix was the eleventh round of the 1989 Grand Prix motorcycle racing season. It took place on the weekend of 14–16 July 1989 at the Bugatti Circuit located in Le Mans.

== 500 cc race report ==
Eddie Lawson on pole. At the start, Wayne Rainey gets around Lawson, with Freddie Spencer in third, followed by Pierfrancesco Chili and Christian Sarron. Soon it’s the California duo with a small gap, and Kevin Schwantz has made up for his bad start by moving into third, with Kevin Magee in fourth.

Wayne Gardner crashes out, and Schwantz joins the fight for first, with back-marker traffic making life difficult for Lawson and Rainey.

Schwantz is braking very late and making it stick, and he and Lawson start to drop Rainey. Lawson manages to get past Schwantz on the start-finish straight, and though very few win a last lap battle with Schwantz, Lawson manages it, putting Schwantz in a crucial second place to extract maximum points from Rainey in third.

== 500 cc classification ==
Pos.	Rider	Team	Manufacturer	Laps	Time/Retired	Grid	Points
1	(United States) Eddie Lawson	Rothmans Kanemoto Honda	Honda	29	50:16.940	1	20
2	(United States) Kevin Schwantz	Suzuki Pepsi Cola	Suzuki	29	+0.770	2	17
3	(United States) Wayne Rainey	Team Lucky Strike Roberts	Yamaha	29	+15.530	3	15
4	(France) Christian Sarron	Sonauto Gauloises Blondes Yamaha Mobil 1	Yamaha	29	+23.590	5	13
5	(Australia) Kevin Magee	Team Lucky Strike Roberts	Yamaha	29	+24.210	4	11
6	(Italy) Pierfrancesco Chili	HB Honda Gallina Team	Honda	29	+37.000	7	10
7	(United Kingdom) Niall Mackenzie	Marlboro Yamaha Team Agostini	Yamaha	29	+53.540	6	9
8	(Australia) Mick Doohan	Rothmans Honda Team	Honda	29	+59.120	8	8
9	(United Kingdom) Rob McElnea	Cabin Racing Team	Honda	29	+1:26.290	11	7
10	(France) Adrien Morillas	Team ROC Elf Honda	Honda	29	+1:31.460	15	6
11	(United States) Randy Mamola	Cagiva Corse	Cagiva	28	+1 Lap	13	5
12	(France) Thierry Crine	Minolta Suzuki Racing Team	Suzuki	28	+1 Lap	16	4
13	(Italy) Alessandro Valesi	Team Iberia	Yamaha	28	+1 Lap	19	3
14	(United Kingdom) Simon Buckmaster	Racing Team Katayama	Honda	28	+1 Lap	21	2
15	(Italy) Fabio Biliotti	Racing Team Katayama	Honda	27	+2 Laps	27	1
16	(Republic of Ireland) Eddie Laycock		Honda	27	+2 Laps	20	
17	(Switzerland) Bruno Kneubühler	Romer Racing Suisse	Honda	27	+2 Laps	22	
18	(Spain) Juan Lopez Mella	Club Motocross Pozuelo	Honda	27	+2 Laps	26	
19	(France) Claude Albert		Suzuki	27	+2 Laps	23	
20	(France) Jean Paul Lecointe	Motodepot	Suzuki	27	+2 Laps	28	
21	(Switzerland) Nicholas Schmassman	FMS	Honda	27	+2 Laps	31	
22	(France) Pascal Seguela		Honda	27	+2 Laps	34	
23	(France) Bernard Gitton	Byblos	Fior	27	+2 Laps	35	
24	(Spain) Francisco Gonzales	Club Motocross Pozuelo	Honda	27	+2 Laps	36	
25	(Netherlands) Cees Doorakkers	HRK Motors	Honda	27	+2 Laps	24	
Ret	(United States) Freddie Spencer	Marlboro Yamaha Team Agostini	Yamaha		Retirement	9	
Ret	(Luxembourg) Andreas Leuthe	Librenti Corse	Suzuki		Retirement	33	
Ret	(Switzerland) Marco Gentile	Fior Marlboro	Fior		Retirement	18	
Ret	(Australia) Wayne Gardner	Rothmans Honda Team	Honda		Retirement	10	
Ret	(Italy) Marco Papa	Team Greco	Paton		Retirement	25	
Ret	(France) Patrick Salles		Fior Honda		Retirement	30	
Ret	(France) Patrick Lerustre		Fior		Retirement	29	
Ret	(France) Bernard Andrault		Honda		Retirement	32	
Ret	(United States) Fred Merkel	HB Honda Gallina Team	Honda		Retirement	12	
Ret	(France) Raymond Roche	Cagiva Corse	Cagiva		Retirement	17	
DNS	(France) Dominique Sarron	Team ROC Elf Honda	Honda		Did not start	14	
DNQ	(Italy) Vittorio Scatola		Honda		Did not qualify		

Previous race: 1989 Belgian Grand Prix	FIM Grand Prix World Championship; 1989 season	Next race: 1989 British Grand Prix
Previous race: 1988 French Grand Prix	French motorcycle Grand Prix	Next race: 1990 French Grand Prix
