= 1989 Belgian motorcycle Grand Prix =

(Belgium) 1989 Belgian Grand Prix
Race details
- Race 10 of 15 races in the 1989 Grand Prix motorcycle racing season
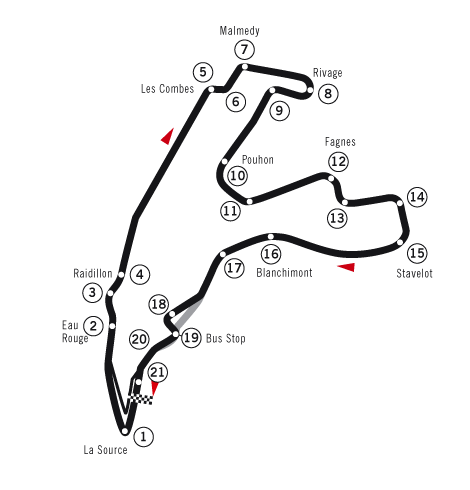
- Date: 2 July 1989
- Official name: Belgium Motorcycle Grand Prix
- Location: Circuit de Spa-Francorchamps
- Course: Permanent racing facility; 7.004 km (4.352 mi)

500cc
Pole position
- Rider: (United States) Kevin Schwantz
- Time: 2:24.650
Fastest lap
- Rider: (United States) Kevin Schwantz
- Time: 2:26.110
Podium
- First: (United States) Eddie Lawson
- Second: (United States) Kevin Schwantz
- Third: (United States) Wayne Rainey

250cc
Pole position
- Rider: (Belgium) Didier de Radiguès
- Time: 2:31.790
Fastest lap
- Rider: (Spain) Sito Pons
- Time: 2:33.530
Podium
- First: (Switzerland) Jacques Cornu
- Second: (Spain) Sito Pons
- Third: (Spain) Carlos Cardús

125cc
Pole position
- Rider: (Italy) Ezio Gianola
- Time: 2:43.470
Fastest lap
- Rider: (Netherlands) Hans Spaan
- Time: 2:55.740
Podium
- First: (Netherlands) Hans Spaan
- Second: (Italy) Ezio Gianola
- Third: (Japan) Hisashi Unemoto

The 1989 Belgian motorcycle Grand Prix was the tenth round of the 1989 Grand Prix motorcycle racing season. It took place on the weekend of 30 June-2 July 1989 at Spa-Francorchamps.

== 500 cc race report ==
Kevin Schwantz makes it six poles in a row, and John Kocinski makes his 500 debut.

The first turns go to Eddie Lawson, Wayne Rainey and Schwantz. Christian Sarron watches from fourth as the three ahead scrape fairings. The quartet get well clear, but wet patches begin to appear on the track.

Rainey and Schwantz raise their hands to stop the race, but ahead of them Lawson and Sarron continue at race pace. Lawson soon becomes aware of the water and raises his hand too, but Sarron, perhaps under the mistaken impression that he’s dropping the other three, seems too enthusiastic to stop and loses the front-end on a fast left. The riders pit with 5 laps raced.

It looks like the restart on aggregate time will be dry, and again Lawson, Rainey and Schwantz get away at the front, though the sky darkens. Again, the leaders raise their hands after the 9th lap, but before everyone can pit, Mick Doohan and Kocinski collide, sliding without serious injury.

The podium of the second leg is Lawson, Schwantz and Rainey, but the race organizers decide to run a third leg in the wet.

The third race sees Schwantz get away from Rainey, while Lawson gets into a tussle with Kocinski for third. On the last lap, with a comfortable lead, Schwantz crashes out on the brakes, and Rainey wheelies in for the lead, followed by Kocinski and Lawson. However, the results of the third race are later nullified, giving Lawson the win and closing the gap to Rainey. The points are later halved when a rule is discovered that only one restart is allowed.

The FIM had decided by 1989 that there could be no more than two starts and that after the second race, started on slicks, was stopped due to rain, the race would be deemed complete.

In an interesting footnote, the 1989 Belgium Grand Prix in Spa Francorchamps, scheduled for 18 laps and 73.3 miles, was entered in the books as a “complete” eight-lap, 34.5-mile sprint race victory for Eddie Lawson. But if you look at the old magazines you’ll see Kevin Schwantz celebrating the victory atop a wet podium and John Kocinski standing third in his 500 debut.

In fact, the race director, fearing a riot if he sent the fans home after only seeing two aborted starts and eight recorded laps, decided to appease the crowd by sending the riders out again even though it was clearly against the rules. Word was that the “promoter” ordered the race director to do this. The “promoter” was Bernie Ecclestone. Eventually half points were awarded and the FIM realized that something had to be done.

Thus the “wet race” and “dry race” rules were instituted. Under these rules if a race starts in the dry with riders on slicks and rain begins to the extent that the race director believes that there is insufficient traction for slick tires, he orders red flags. If three or more laps have been run, the original race distance, minus the number of laps run and minus one additional lap, is established for the second leg. However, regardless of the conditions at the start of the second part, the race is declared “wet,’ meaning that it would not be stopped simply because it begins to rain. Riders go out for part two with the understanding that, if they opted for the wrong tires, they either have to wobble around like Steve Manship at Silverstone or come in for a change. The final results are then to be based on aggregate times.

This worked from the late eighties until 2003 when Dorna, protecting their TV coverage against long delays, overrode strong MSMA (Motorcycle Sport Manufacturers Association) objections and managed to introduce the first of three variants of “flag to flag” racing -- races which would not be stopped and restarted due to rain.

== 500 cc classification ==
Pos.	Rider	Team	Manufacturer	Laps	Time/Retired	Grid	Points
1	(United States) Eddie Lawson	Rothmans Kanemoto Honda	Honda	8	19:46.260	5	10
2	(United States) Kevin Schwantz	Suzuki Pepsi Cola	Suzuki	8	+0.920	1	8.5
3	(United States) Wayne Rainey	Team Lucky Strike Roberts	Yamaha	8	+1.520	2	7.5
4	(France) Christian Sarron	Sonauto Gauloises Blondes Yamaha Mobil 1	Yamaha	8	+11.430	4	6.5
5	(United States) John Kocinski	Team Lucky Strike Roberts	Yamaha	8	+15.220	8	5.5
6	(Italy) Pierfrancesco Chili	HB Honda Gallina Team	Honda	8	+18.870	7	5
7	(Australia) Kevin Magee	Team Lucky Strike Roberts	Yamaha	8	+20.720	6	4.5
8	(Australia) Mick Doohan	Rothmans Honda Team	Honda	8	+27.230	3	4
9	(United States) Freddie Spencer	Marlboro Yamaha Team Agostini	Yamaha	8	+27.850	9	3.5
10	(United Kingdom) Niall Mackenzie	Marlboro Yamaha Team Agostini	Yamaha	8	+32.840	11	3
11	(United Kingdom) Rob McElnea	Cabin Racing Team	Honda	8	+32.970	13	2.5
12	(Switzerland) Marco Gentile	Fior Marlboro	Fior	8	+1:25.460	16	2
13	(Netherlands) Cees Doorakkers	HRK Motors	Honda	8	+1:34.460	21	1.5
14	(Republic of Ireland) Eddie Laycock		Honda	8	+1:37.060	20	1
15	(United Kingdom) Simon Buckmaster	Racing Team Katayama	Honda	8	+1:37.590	17	0.5
16	(Austria) Josef Doppler		Honda	7	+1 Lap	22	
17	(Switzerland) Bruno Kneubuhler	Romer Racing Suisse	Honda	7	+1 Lap	18	
18	(Italy) Marco Papa	Team Greco	Paton	7	+1 Lap	19	
19	(Switzerland) Nicholas Schmassman	FMS	Honda	7	+1 Lap	23	
20	(West Germany) Hans Klingebiel		Suzuki	7	+1 Lap	26	
21	(Spain) Fernando Gonzales	Club Motocross Pozuelo	Honda	7	+1 Lap	25	
22	(United Kingdom) Mark Phillips		Suzuki	7	+1 Lap	24	
23	(United States) Randy Mamola	Cagiva Corse	Cagiva	7	+1 Lap	14	
24	(Italy) Alessandro Valesi	Team Iberia	Yamaha		+6 Laps	15	
25	(Australia) Wayne Gardner	Rothmans Honda Team	Honda		+6 Laps	10	
26	(Czechoslovakia) Pavol Dekánek		Honda		+6 Laps	27	
DNS	(United Kingdom) Ron Haslam	Suzuki Pepsi Cola	Suzuki		Did not start	12	
DNQ	(Belgium) Patrick Chavanne		Honda		Did not qualify		

Previous race: 1989 Dutch TT	FIM Grand Prix World Championship; 1989 season	Next race: 1989 French Grand Prix
Previous race: 1988 Belgian Grand Prix	Belgian Grand Prix	Next race: 1990 Belgian Grand Prix
