= 1989 Austrian motorcycle Grand Prix =

(Austria) 1989 Austrian Grand Prix
Race details
- Race 7 of 15 races in the 1989 Grand Prix motorcycle racing season
- Date: 4 June 1989
- Official name: Großer Preis von Österreich
- Location: Salzburgring
- Course: Permanent racing facility; 4.243 km (2.636 mi)

500cc
Pole position
- Rider: (United States) Kevin Schwantz
- Time: 1:19.230
Fastest lap
- Rider: (United States) Kevin Schwantz
- Time: 1:19.150
Podium
- First: (United States) Kevin Schwantz
- Second: (United States) Eddie Lawson
- Third: (United States) Wayne Rainey

250cc
Pole position
- Rider: (Spain) Sito Pons
- Time: 1:24.690
Fastest lap
- Rider: (Spain) Sito Pons
- Time: 1:24.690
Podium
- First: (Spain) Sito Pons
- Second: (Switzerland) Jacques Cornu
- Third: (West Germany) Martin Wimmer

125cc
Pole position
- Rider: (Spain) Jorge Martínez
- Time: 1:32.580
Fastest lap
- Rider: (Spain) Àlex Crivillé
- Time: 1:38.130
Podium
- First: (Netherlands) Hans Spaan
- Second: (Spain) Julián Miralles
- Third: (Spain) Àlex Crivillé

The 1989 Austrian motorcycle Grand Prix was the seventh round of the 1989 Grand Prix motorcycle racing season. It took place on the weekend of 2–4 June 1989 at the Salzburgring.

== 500 cc race report ==
Another pole for Kevin Schwantz, with Eddie Lawson and Wayne Rainey on his left as the light turns green. Lawson leads a large group through the first lap, with Rainey, Schwantz and about 4 other riders. Soon it’s a trio of the leading riders, until Schwantz begins to desperately open a gap, his bike squirming and bucking into the corners. A red mist seems to descend on Rainey, as he passes Lawson on the outside to briefly move into second, while Ron Haslam leads a fight for fourth that includes Christian Sarron, Pierfrancesco Chili, Kevin Magee and Mick Doohan, the last going off track trying to come to terms with the pace.

Schwantz enlarges his gap, while Lawson drops Rainey, which turns out to be the podium order. Rainey’s 13 point lead over Lawson is down to 11.

== 500cc classification ==
Pos.	Rider	Team	Manufacturer	Laps	Time/Retired	Grid	Points
1	(United States) Kevin Schwantz	Suzuki Pepsi Cola	Suzuki	29	38:39.005	1	20
2	(United States) Eddie Lawson	Rothmans Kanemoto Honda	Honda	29	+2.130	2	17
3	(United States) Wayne Rainey	Team Lucky Strike Roberts	Yamaha	29	+19.900	3	15
4	(France) Christian Sarron	Sonauto Gauloises Blondes Yamaha Mobil 1	Yamaha	29	+37.830	5	13
5	(Australia) Kevin Magee	Team Lucky Strike Roberts	Yamaha	29	+38.140	7	11
6	(Italy) Pierfrancesco Chili	HB Honda Gallina Team	Honda	29	+38.500	4	10
7	(United Kingdom) Ron Haslam	Suzuki Pepsi Cola	Suzuki	29	+38.910	6	9
8	(Australia) Mick Doohan	Rothmans Honda Team	Honda	29	+56.770	10	8
9	(United States) Freddie Spencer	Marlboro Yamaha Team Agostini	Yamaha	29	+58.040	9	7
10	(France) Dominique Sarron	Team ROC Elf Honda	Honda	29	+1:03.590	8	6
11	(United Kingdom) Rob McElnea	Cabin Racing Team	Honda	29	+1:15.170	11	5
12	(Italy) Alessandro Valesi	Team Iberia	Yamaha	28	+1 Lap	14	4
13	(United Kingdom) Simon Buckmaster	Racing Team Katayama	Honda	28	+1 Lap	15	3
14	(Switzerland) Marco Gentile	Fior Marlboro	Fior	27	+2 Laps	16	2
15	(Switzerland) Bruno Kneubühler	Romer Racing Suisse	Honda	27	+2 Laps	17	1
16	(Austria) Josef Doppler		Honda	27	+2 Laps	19	
17	(West Germany) Georg Robert Jung	Romer Telefix	Honda	27	+2 Laps	18	
18	(West Germany) Stefan Klabacher		Honda	27	+2 Laps	21	
19	(West Germany) Michael Rudroff	HRK Motors	Honda	27	+2 Laps	22	
20	(Austria) Karl Dauer	PC Racing	Honda	27	+2 Laps	24	
21	(Switzerland) Nicholas Schmassman	FMS	Honda	27	+2 Laps	23	
22	(Spain) Francisco Gonzales	Club Motocross Pozuelo	Honda	27	+2 Laps	26	
23	(Czechoslovakia) Pavol Dekánek		Honda	26	+3 Laps	30	
24	(Austria) Rudolf Zeller		Manhattan	26	+3 Laps	27	
25	(West Germany) Hans Klingebiel		Honda	26	+3 Laps	25	
26	(Austria) Thomas Berghammer		Suzuki	26	+3 Laps	29	
Ret	(West Germany) Alois Meyer	Rallye Sport	Honda		Retirement	28	
Ret	(United States) Randy Mamola	Cagiva Corse	Cagiva		Retirement	12	
Ret	(Spain) Juan Lopez Mella	Club Motocross Pozuelo	Honda		Retirement	20	
DNS	(Japan) Norihiko Fujiwara	Yamaha Motor Company	Yamaha		Did not start	13	
DNQ	(Venezuela) Larry Moreno Vacondio		Suzuki		Did not qualify		

Previous race: 1989 German Grand Prix	FIM Grand Prix World Championship; 1989 season	Next race: 1989 Yugoslavian Grand Prix
Previous race: 1988 Austrian Grand Prix	Austrian Grand Prix	Next race: 1990 Austrian Grand Prix
