= Jean Pierre Jeandat =

French motorcycle racer

Jean-Pierre Jeandat
- Born: March 9, 1970 (age 56); Reims
- Years active: 1989-1996
- Known for: Motorcycle speed racing

Jean-Pierre Jeandat (born 9 March 1970), is a French motorcycle racer. He is known for racing with the number 51.

Jeandat started at the age of 14, participating in 50cc races with a modified moped prepared by Zonzon in Argenteuil, where he showed promise. He won when the FFM organized a championship in this category in 1986.

In 1990, Jeandat became the Champion of France Superbike in the 250cc category.

Jeandat's Grand Prix career began in the 125cc category, participating in the 1989 French Grand Prix and finishing 13th. The following year, in 1990, he raced in the 250cc category for two events. From 1991 to 1993, he competed in the full season, still in the 250cc category. Then, from 1994 to 1996, he participated in the 500cc championship. His last record was in 1996, where he ranked 17 in the Italy Imola GP.

During his career, Jeandat scored 86 points in the World Championship across all categories.
