= Manuel Herreros =

Spanish motorcycle racer

- Nationality: Spanish
Motorcycle racing career statistics
Grand Prix motorcycle racing
Active years	1984 - 1991
First race	1984 125cc Spanish Grand Prix
Last race	1991 125cc German Grand Prix
First win	1986 80cc West German Grand Prix
Last win	1987 80cc San Marino Grand Prix
Team	Derbi
Championships	80cc - 1989
Starts / Wins / Podiums / Poles / F. laps / Points; 62 / 2 / 22 / 0 / 1 / 419

Manuel Herreros Casas, also known as "Champi", (born on 20 April 1963 in Villarrobledo, Spain) is a Spanish former Grand Prix motorcycle road racer. He was the 1989 F.I.M. 80cc world champion. He is the last 80 cc world champion, as the class was discontinued after the 1989 season. He was Spanish national champion (Campeonato de España de Velocidad) in the 80 cc class in 1987.

== Career ==
Herreros was a competitor in a total of 62 races in Grand Prix motorcycle racing between 1984 and 1991, and won the Grand Prix world champion title in the 80 cc class in 1989, without having won a race during the season. Herreros took the victory during the 1986 Grand Prix motorcycle racing season in the German motorcycle Grand Prix and during the 1987 season in the San Marino GP each in the 80 cc class. His only podium finish in the 125 cc occurred in the 1988 Nations motorcycle Grand Prix race at Imola.

== Awards and recognition ==
Herreros retired from competition in 1991 and since then has been engaged in directing his race team. Throughout his career, he has received several awards in recognition of his civic and sporting achievements, such as Medalla al Mèrit Esportiu (1989), the Insígnia d'or de l'Ajuntament de Torrent (4 March 2002), and the l'Homenatge de l'Associació de Veïns Nicolàs Andreu de Torrent (15 August 2006). He is an honorary member of UNICEF.

Herreros was selected to participate in a "Lap Of Honor" with other famed riders (John McGuinness, Phillip McCallen, Freddie Spencer, Phil Read, Michael Dunlop, Giacomo Agostini and others) at the 2013 Isle of Man TT.

Sporting positions
Preceded by Jorge Martínez	Spanish 80cc Champion; 1987	Succeeded by Jorge Martínez
