= Peter Öttl =

German motorcycle racer

- Nationality: German
- Born: 24 March 1965 (age 61); Berchtesgaden, West Germany
Motorcycle racing career statistics
Grand Prix motorcycle racing
Active years	1986 - 1997
First race	1986 80cc Baden-Württemberg motorcycle Grand Prix
Last race	1997 125cc Imola Grand Prix
First win	1989 80cc German Grand Prix
Last win	1996 125cc Italian Grand Prix
Team	Krauser
Starts / Wins / Podiums / Poles / F. laps / Points; 111 / 5 / 20 / 0 / 7 / 628

Peter Öttl (born 24 March 1965 in Berchtesgaden) is a German former Grand Prix motorcycle road racer. In 1989, he won two Grand Prix races and finished the year in third place in the 80cc world championship behind Manuel Herreros and Stefan Dörflinger. Öttl won five Grand Prix races during his career.

Öttl was involved in a serious accident in 1991 at Brno. After Öttl crashed, he was struck by Frenchman Alain Bronec and Italian Emilio Cuppini. Öttl and Bronec both suffered heavy injuries as a result.

Öttl is the father of Philipp Öttl.
