= Herri Torrontegui =

Spanish motorcycle racer

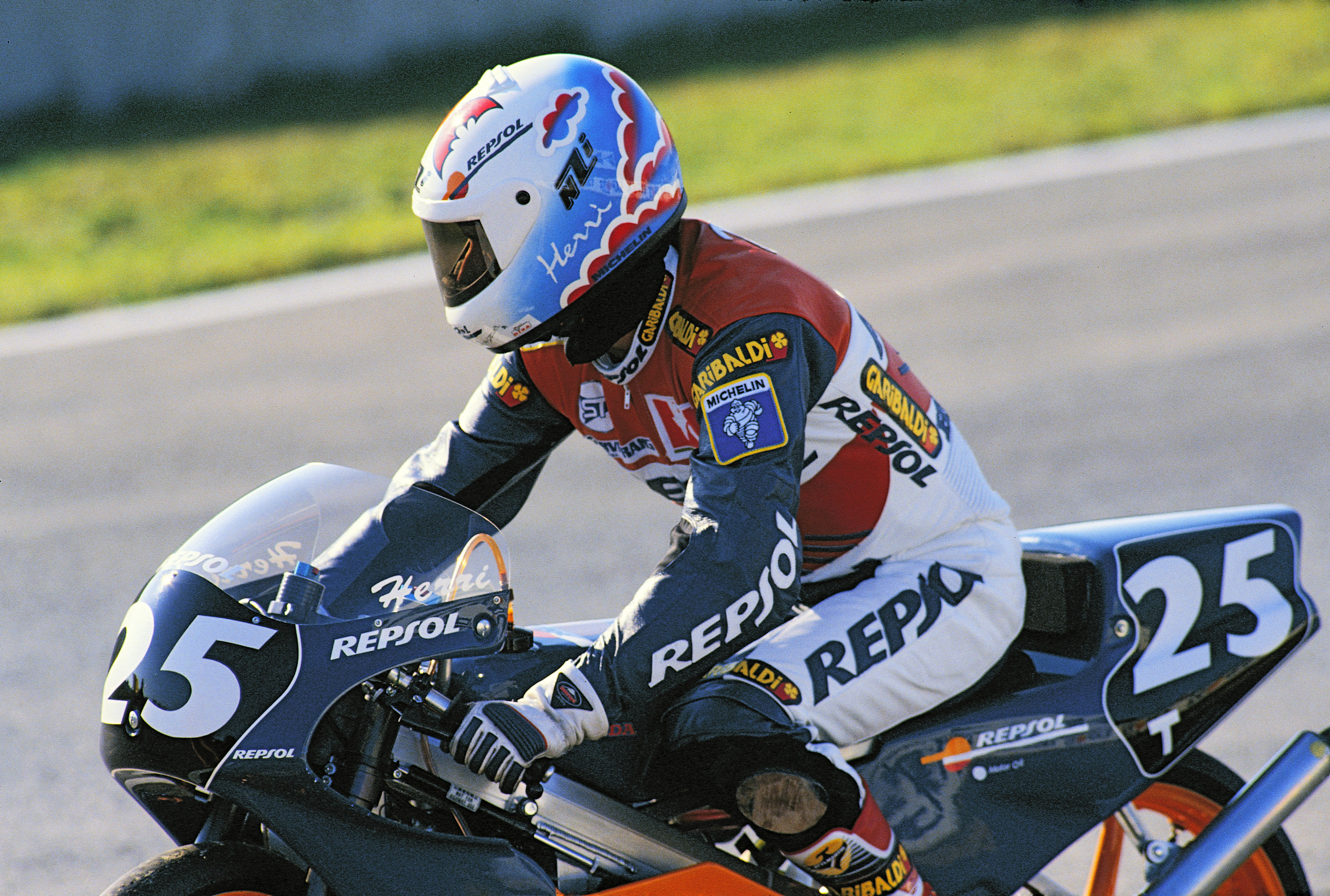
- Torrontégui at the 1990 Spanish Grand Prix.
- Nationality: Spanish
- Born: 19 April 1967 (age 59); Gorliz
Motorcycle racing career statistics
Grand Prix motorcycle racing
Active years	1986–1996
First race	1985 80cc Nations Grand Prix
Last race	1996 125cc Australian Grand Prix
First win	1989 80cc Spanish Grand Prix
Last win	1989 80cc Czechoslovak Grand Prix
Team	Suzuki
Championships	385.5
Starts / Wins / Podiums / Poles / F. laps / Points; 125 / 2 / 6 / 0 / 1 / 672

Herri Torrontegui (born 19 April 1967) is a former Grand Prix motorcycle road racer from the Spanish Basque Country. His best year was 1989, when he won two Grand Prix races and finished in fourth place in the 80cc world championship.

After his racing career, Torrontegui served as a manager for Spanish rider, Efrén Vázquez competing for the Ajo Motorsport team.
