= Paton (motorcycles) =

Historical motorcycle manufacturer

- Type: Private
- Industry: Motorcycle manufacturing
- Founded: 1958; 68 years ago
- Founder: Giuseppe Pattoni, Lino Tonti
- Headquarters: Cassinetta di Lugagnano, MI, Italy
- Area served: Worldwide
- Products: Motorcycle
- Website: paton.it

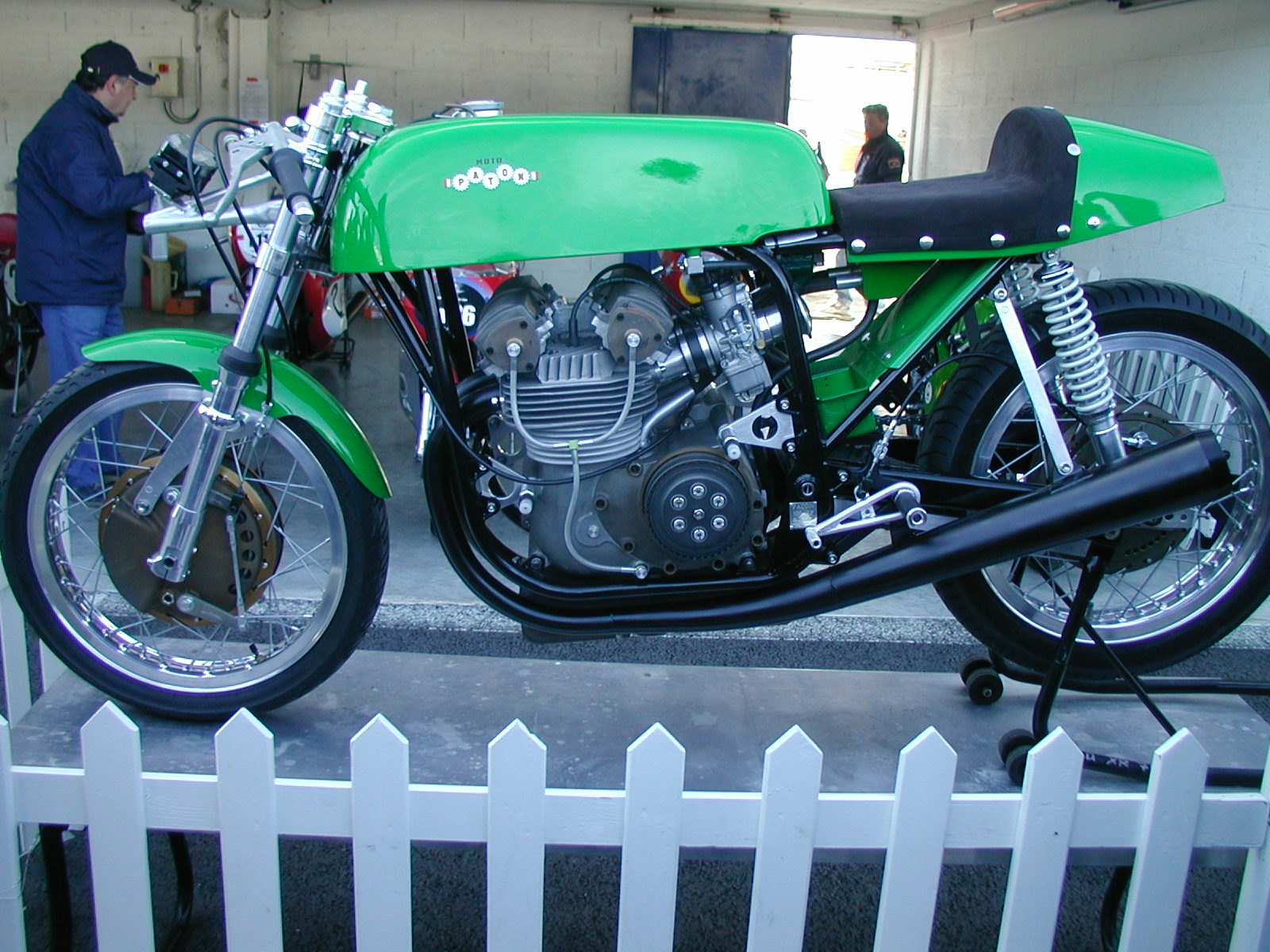
The Paton 500 twin in the classic green color

Paton is an Italian motorcycle manufacturer. In 1957 after FB Mondial pulled out of Grand Prix racing, Paton was set up by Giuseppe Pattoni (chief mechanic of the FB Mondial GP team) and designer Lino Tonti.

== See also ==
- Paton PG500RC
- List of Italian companies
- List of motorcycle manufacturers
