= 1997 Catalan motorcycle Grand Prix =

Motorcycle race meeting

(Catalonia) 1997 Catalan Grand Prix
Race details
- Race 13 of 15 races in the 1997 Grand Prix motorcycle racing season
- Date: 14 September 1997
- Official name: Gran Premi Marlboro de Catalunya
- Location: Circuit de Catalunya
- Course: Permanent racing facility; 4.727 km (2.937 mi)

500cc
Pole position
- Rider: (Australia) Mick Doohan
- Time: 1:45.990
Fastest lap
- Rider: (Australia) Mick Doohan
- Time: 1:46.861
Podium
- First: (Australia) Mick Doohan
- Second: (Spain) Carlos Checa
- Third: (Spain) Àlex Crivillé

250cc
Pole position
- Rider: (Germany) Ralf Waldmann
- Time: 1:47.621
Fastest lap
- Rider: (Germany) Ralf Waldmann
- Time: 1:48.681
Podium
- First: (Germany) Ralf Waldmann
- Second: (Italy) Max Biaggi
- Third: (Japan) Tohru Ukawa

125cc
Pole position
- Rider: (Japan) Kazuto Sakata
- Time: 1:53.476
Fastest lap
- Rider: (Japan) Kazuto Sakata
- Time: 1:53.773
Podium
- First: (Italy) Valentino Rossi
- Second: (Japan) Kazuto Sakata
- Third: (Japan) Noboru Ueda

The 1997 Catalan motorcycle Grand Prix was the thirteenth round of the 1997 Grand Prix motorcycle racing season. It took place on 14 September 1997 at the Circuit de Catalunya.

== 500cc race report ==
This race was most notable for the threeway battle for victory between Mick Doohan, Carlos Checa and Àlex Crivillé.

Mick Doohan has a firm points advantage over his adversaries with 295 points, having already won the title last round.

Mick Doohan took Saturday's pole position with a time of 1:45.990. In second place starts Carlos Checa, followed by Nobuatsu Aoki and Doriano Romboni in third and fourth position. The second row of the grid consists out of Tadayuki Okada in fifth, Luca Cadalora in sixth, Àlex Crivillé in seventh and Kenny Roberts Jr. in eighth.

The riders all go through the warm-up lap and then line up on their respective grid slots. As the lights go out, it is Aoki and Okada who have great starts. At the start/finish straight they ride side-by-side but eventually Aoki brakes later and leads the field going into Elf (Turn 1) on the opening lap. Crivillé also managed to slot in ahead of Doohan in third position. Sete Gibernau meanwhile has already retired from the race after he lost the front end and slid into the gravel trap at Elf. At the short straight coming up to La Caixa (Turn 10), Okada takes over the lead by going up the inside of Aoki at the slow right-hand corner.

Lap two begins and the top six is as follows: Okada, Aoki, Crivillé, Cadalora, Doohan and Norifumi Abe. At the start/finish straight coming up to Elf, Doohan overtakes Cadalora for fourth place. Crivillé also looks up the inside of Aoki but is too far and has to slot in behind the Japanese for now. At Seat (Turn 5), Alex Barros overtakes Abe by lunging down his inside for seventh position. A small gap is now present between sixth place Checa and seventh place Barros.

On lap three, Doohan sets the fastest lap of the race. At La Caixa, Crivillé dives past Aoki by going up his inside and outbreaking the Japanese rider.

Lap four and Crivillé now tries to take the lead from Okada at the entrance of Elf, but decides to slot behind for the time being. Behind him, Doohan also fancies a look up the inside of Aoki but also does not make the move. At Seat, both Crivillé and Doohan pass their rivals. Both go up the inside at the slow left-hander for first and third position. It's now a Repsol Honda 1-2-3.

On lap five, Doohan overtakes Okada for second place at the end of the short straight before La Caixa by going up the inside of the Spaniard. Okada has now opened up a small gap to Doohan.

Lap six and Aoki makes a move at Repsol (Turn 4), diving up the inside of Okada and taking third as a result. Checa also moves up to fourth by passing the Japanese as well.

As Crivillé crosses the line to start lap seven, Doohan lines up a move halfway at the start/finish straight. They go side-by-side and Crivillé tries to outbreak the Australian, but having the inside line going into Elf he takes over the lead anyway, forcing Crivillé to slot in behind him in second. Two gaps have now formed: One between the pair of Doohan-Crivillé one between the pair of Aoki-Checa. At Seat, Checa finally makes a move on Aoki after shadowing him for a whole lap, going down the inside and taking third from him.

On lap eight, Crivillé does the exact same thing what Doohan did to him the lap before. He pulls alongside the Australian and overtook him with a wide margin before they both enter Elf. Checa meanwhile has closed the gap and is now behind the battling Repsol Honda duo.

Lap nine and Doohan looks to be making a pass on Crivillé, but instead gets surprised by Checa who overtakes the Australian at the end of the start/finish straight and into Elf. The top six is now as follows: Crivillé, Checa, Doohan, Aoki, Okada and Cadalora. At the short straight before La Caixa, Checa goes wide after miscalculating his breaking point, allowing Doohan to take second position back upon exit.

On lap ten, Aoki passes Checa for third at the entrance of Elf by going up his inside. Doohan is still right behind his Repsol Honda teammate Crivillé meanwhile. At Seat, Checa retakes third by diving down the inside of Aoki.

Lap eleven and Doohan is still right behind Crivillé. He looks to be making a lunge down his inside, but opts to stay behind for the time being. Cadalora has closed the gap to Aoki and is shadowing him for fourth as well. No overtakes happen at the front during this lap.

On lap twelve, Aoki looks to retake third from Checa at the end of the start/finish straight, but isn't able to and has to slot in behind the Spaniard. At Seat, Doohan goes up Crivillé's inside and takes the lead in a surprise move. Checa then follows suit by lunging down the distracted Spaniard at Turn 7 to stay in touch with Doohan.

Lap thirteen - the halfway point of the race - and Crivillé overtakes Checa for second at the end of the start/finish straight. The fighting has allowed Doohan to pull a gap to Crivillé. At Seat, Checa goes down Crivillé's inside and overtakes him yet again.

On lap fourteen, Checa is slowly closing the gap he has to Doohan. Doing so, he also takes Crivillé with him to make the fight for the lead a three-way battle again.

As Doohan crosses the start/finish straight to begin lap fifteen, he pulls to the right to make sure Checa doesn't have his slipstream. Checa stays on the left, then both switch positions as Checa manages to pass Doohan on speed going into Elf, taking over the lead from the Australian. Aoki and Cadalora meanwhile are still relatively close behind Crivillé, making this now a five-way battle for the top position.

Lap sixteen and Checa has pulled a slight gap back to Doohan. He looks to be making a move at the end of the start/finish straight, but decides to stay behind the Spaniard for now. Cadalora is now slowly losing touch with the top four as well.

On lap seventeen, Doohan takes back the lead from Checa thanks to the Repsol Honda's superior top line speed at the start/finish straight. At Repsol, Aoki tries to take third by going up the inside of Crivillé but runs wide upon exit, gifting the place back to the Spaniard.

Lap eighteen and Aoki is now losing touch with the top three. Cadalora is right behind him and makes his move at the start/finish straight, going side-by-side and taking fourth from him before Elf. Checa meanwhile is very close behind Doohan, with Crivillé shadowing the pair in third place.

On lap nineteen, Crivillé now has a significant gap back to Cadalora, meaning that it has become a three-way battle for the win. Barros retires from the race after a highside at Elf caused him to slide out of contention and into the gravel trap.

Lap twenty and Checa has pulled a slight gap back to third place Crivillé, who is being shadowed by Cadalora. Checa tries a move at Seat but chooses to stay behind him for now.

On lap twenty-one, Checa makes his move at the start/finish straight. He goes side-by-side, then passes Doohan on the inside at the beginning of Elf under loud cheering from the majority Spanish and Catalan fans. Doohan shadows him all throughout the lap but does not make a move.

As Checa crosses the line to start lap twenty-two, Doohan repasses him for the lead at the start/finish straight. At Seat, Checa makes a late lunge up Doohan's inside to take first place back once again. However, he runs wide as a result, allowing Doohan to stay very close behind him.

Lap twenty-three and Doohan takes first position back at the start/finish straight thanks to his superior top-end speed. The group of five encounter backmarker Laurent Naveau, who lets them through without any problems.

On lap twenty-four, the penultimate lap, Doohan sets the fastest lap of the race with a time of 1:47.200. He also has pulled a very small gap to Checa, who has not been able to make a move on the Australian during this lap.

The final lap - lap twenty-five - starts and Checa has a big gap back to Crivillé, securing him second place at the very least. Behind Crivillé, Cadalora is still relatively close. Doohan sets another fastest lap, this time with a time of 1:46.861. Checa has not been able to attack Doohan, who goes on to cross the line and win the race - his tenth consecutive win, breaking Giacomo Agostini's record, as well as his twelfth and final win of the season - in jubilant fashion with a +0.432 second advantage over second place Checa. A bit further back, Crivillé comes home in third, making it a Spanish/Catalan 2-3 on the podium, and Cadalora in fourth. Even further back, Aoki comes home in fifth and Okada just manages to hold off Takuma Aoki for sixth.

During the parade lap back to parc fermé, Doohan throws his arms in the air to celebrate his win. He also waves at the fans, as do local heroes Checa and Crivillé and non-local Cadalora. One of the marshalls hands Doohan the Australian flag, which he flies with pride. Crivillé rides alongside him to congratulate him on his win.

The riders make their way up on the podium, starting with Doohan, then Crivillé and then Checa. The riders receive their respective trophies, with the crowd cheering loudly as Checa and Crivillé receive theirs. The Australian national anthem plays for Doohan, with the man receiving the champagne as it ends, cheekily spraying one of the girls as he does so.

== 500 cc classification ==
Pos.	Rider	Team	Manufacturer	Time/Retired	Points
1	(Australia) Mick Doohan	Repsol YPF Honda Team	Honda	44:56.149	25
2	(Spain) Carlos Checa	Movistar Honda Pons	Honda	+0.432	20
3	(Spain) Àlex Crivillé	Repsol YPF Honda Team	Honda	+1.750	16
4	(Italy) Luca Cadalora	Red Bull Yamaha WCM	Yamaha	+2.792	13
5	(Japan) Nobuatsu Aoki	Rheos Elf FCC TS	Honda	+8.159	11
6	(Japan) Tadayuki Okada	Repsol YPF Honda Team	Honda	+24.631	10
7	(Japan) Takuma Aoki	Repsol Honda	Honda	+24.826	9
8	(United States) Kenny Roberts Jr.	Marlboro Team Roberts	Modenas KR3	+41.369	8
9	(Spain) Juan Borja	Elf 500 ROC	Elf 500	+41.805	7
10	(Italy) Doriano Romboni	IP Aprilia Racing Team	Aprilia	+45.491	6
11	(France) Regis Laconi	Team Tecmas	Honda	+46.438	5
12	(Japan) Norifumi Abe	Yamaha Team Rainey	Yamaha	+47.528	4
13	(Australia) Kirk McCarthy	World Championship Motorsports	Yamaha	+55.442	3
14	(Netherlands) Jurgen van den Goorbergh	Team Millar MQP	Honda	+57.495	2
15	(Spain) Alberto Puig	Movistar Honda Pons	Honda	+1:01.810	1
16	(Germany) Jürgen Fuchs	Elf 500 ROC	Elf 500	+1:02.291	
17	(Australia) Daryl Beattie	Lucky Strike Suzuki	Suzuki	+1:03.530	
18	(Italy) Lucio Pedercini	Team Pedercini	Yamaha	+1:46.366	
19	(Belgium) Laurent Naveau	Millet Racing	ROC Yamaha	+1 Lap	
Ret	(Spain) Sete Gibernau	Yamaha Team Rainey	Yamaha	Retirement	
Ret	(France) Jean-Michel Bayle	Marlboro Team Roberts	Modenas KR3	Retirement	
Ret	(France) Frederic Protat	Soverex FP Racing	Honda	Retirement	
Ret	(Brazil) Alex Barros	Honda Gresini	Honda	Retirement	

== 250 cc classification ==
Pos	Rider	Manufacturer	Time/Retired	Points
1	(Germany) Ralf Waldmann	Honda	42:05.928	25
2	(Italy) Max Biaggi	Honda	+0.550	20
3	(Japan) Tohru Ukawa	Honda	+2.940	16
4	(Japan) Tetsuya Harada	Aprilia	+2.960	13
5	(Italy) Loris Capirossi	Aprilia	+13.760	11
6	(France) Olivier Jacque	Honda	+24.165	10
7	(Japan) Takeshi Tsujimura	TSR-Honda	+27.393	9
8	(Japan) Haruchika Aoki	Honda	+44.398	8
9	(Japan) Noriyasu Numata	Suzuki	+49.040	7
10	(Japan) Osamu Miyazaki	Yamaha	+49.117	6
11	(United Kingdom) Jeremy McWilliams	Honda	+49.542	5
12	(Spain) Emilio Alzamora	Honda	+50.027	4
13	(Spain) Luis d'Antin	Yamaha	+55.168	3
14	(Spain) José Luis Cardoso	Yamaha	+55.266	2
15	(Italy) Franco Battaini	Yamaha	+55.557	1
16	(Italy) Cristiano Migliorati	Honda	+56.213	
17	(Italy) Luca Boscoscuro	Honda	+1:15.407	
18	(Argentina) Sebastian Porto	Aprilia	+1:21.392	
19	(United States) Kurtis Roberts	Honda	+1:55.372	
20	(Spain) Ismael Bonilla	Honda	+1 Lap	
Ret	(Spain) David Guardiola	Honda	Retirement	
Ret	(Spain) Jesus Perez	Honda	Retirement	
Ret	(Spain) Javier Marsella	Honda	Retirement	
Ret	(Italy) Giuseppe Fiorillo	Aprilia	Retirement	
Ret	(United Kingdom) Jamie Robinson	Suzuki	Retirement	
Ret	(Spain) Manuel Luque	Aprilia	Retirement	
Ret	(Spain) José David De Gea	Yamaha	Retirement	
Ret	(Spain) Eustaquio Gavira	Aprilia	Retirement	
Ret	(France) William Costes	Honda	Retirement	
Ret	(Italy) Stefano Perugini	Aprilia	Retirement	
Ret	(Switzerland) Oliver Petrucciani	Aprilia	Retirement	

== 125 cc classification ==
Pos	Rider	Manufacturer	Time/Retired	Points
1	(Italy) Valentino Rossi	Aprilia	42:14.687	25
2	(Japan) Kazuto Sakata	Aprilia	+6.002	20
3	(Japan) Noboru Ueda	Honda	+9.527	16
4	(Italy) Mirko Giansanti	Honda	+11.185	13
5	(Japan) Tomomi Manako	Honda	+11.196	11
6	(Italy) Lucio Cecchinello	Honda	+11.269	10
7	(Italy) Roberto Locatelli	Honda	+11.354	9
8	(Italy) Gianluigi Scalvini	Honda	+18.326	8
9	(Australia) Garry McCoy	Aprilia	+18.366	7
10	(France) Frederic Petit	Honda	+18.555	6
11	(Japan) Masaki Tokudome	Aprilia	+18.603	5
12	(Spain) Jorge Martinez	Aprilia	+18.787	4
13	(Japan) Yoshiaki Katoh	Yamaha	+30.103	3
14	(Germany) Steve Jenkner	Aprilia	+58.817	2
15	(Spain) Alvaro Molina	Honda	+1:13.702	1
16	(Italy) Gino Borsoi	Yamaha	+1:13.785	
17	(Germany) Dirk Raudies	Honda	+1:18.201	
18	(Japan) Youichi Ui	Yamaha	+1:34.319	
19	(Spain) Joan Montero	Honda	+1:38.740	
20	(Spain) Vicente Esparragoso	Yamaha	+2:30.980	
21	(Spain) David Ortega	Honda	+2:56.693	
Ret	(Spain) Xavier Soler	Aprilia	Retirement	
Ret	(United Kingdom) Chris Burns	Honda	Retirement	
Ret	(Japan) Masao Azuma	Honda	Retirement	
Ret	(Spain) Ivan Martinez	Aprilia	Retirement	
Ret	(Spain) Josep Sarda	Honda	Retirement	
Ret	(Spain) Angel Nieto Jr	Aprilia	Retirement	
Ret	(Spain) Enrique Maturana	Yamaha	Retirement	
Ret	(Germany) Manfred Geissler	Aprilia	Retirement	
Ret	(Czech Republic) Jaroslav Hules	Honda	Retirement	

Previous race: 1997 Czech Republic Grand Prix	FIM Grand Prix World Championship; 1997 season	Next race: 1997 Indonesian Grand Prix
Previous race: 1996 Catalan Grand Prix	Catalan Grand Prix	Next race: 1998 Catalan Grand Prix
