= 1997 Czech Republic motorcycle Grand Prix =

1997 Czech Republic Grand Prix
Race details
- Race 12 of 15 races in the 1997 Grand Prix motorcycle racing season
- Date: 31 August 1997
- Official name: Grand Prix České Republiky
- Location: Brno Circuit
- Course: Permanent racing facility; 5.403 km (3.357 mi)

500cc
Pole position
- Rider: (Australia) Mick Doohan
- Time: 2:14.105
Fastest lap
- Rider: (Australia) Mick Doohan
- Time: 2:02.560
Podium
- First: (Australia) Mick Doohan
- Second: (Italy) Luca Cadalora
- Third: (Japan) Nobuatsu Aoki

250cc
Pole position
- Rider: (Germany) Ralf Waldmann
- Time: 2:18.982
Fastest lap
- Rider: (Germany) Ralf Waldmann
- Time: 2:05.393
Podium
- First: (Italy) Max Biaggi
- Second: (France) Olivier Jacque
- Third: (Japan) Tetsuya Harada

125cc
Pole position
- Rider: (Japan) Youichi Ui
- Time: 2:25.891
Fastest lap
- Rider: (Japan) Noboru Ueda
- Time: 2:11.669
Podium
- First: (Japan) Noboru Ueda
- Second: (Japan) Tomomi Manako
- Third: (Italy) Valentino Rossi

The 1997 Czech Republic motorcycle Grand Prix was the twelfth round of the 1997 Grand Prix motorcycle racing season. It took place on 31 August 1997 at the Masaryk Circuit located in Brno, Czech Republic. A young Valentino Rossi took his first title at this track by finishing in 3rd place a year after winning his first race here in 1996

== 500 cc classification ==
Pos.	Rider	Team	Manufacturer	Time/Retired	Points
1	(Australia) Mick Doohan	Repsol YPF Honda Team	Honda	45:25.012	25
2	(Italy) Luca Cadalora	Red Bull Yamaha WCM	Yamaha	+14.858	20
3	(Japan) Nobuatsu Aoki	Rheos Elf FCC TS	Honda	+15.110	16
4	(Spain) Àlex Crivillé	Repsol YPF Honda Team	Honda	+15.323	13
5	(Japan) Norifumi Abe	Yamaha Team Rainey	Yamaha	+15.648	11
6	(Japan) Takuma Aoki	Repsol Honda	Honda	+16.846	10
7	(France) Regis Laconi	Team Tecmas	Honda	+48.778	9
8	(Brazil) Alex Barros	Honda Gresini	Honda	+48.945	8
9	(United States) Kenny Roberts Jr.	Marlboro Team Roberts	Modenas KR3	+50.117	7
10	(Australia) Daryl Beattie	Lucky Strike Suzuki	Suzuki	+1:02.377	6
11	(Netherlands) Jurgen van den Goorbergh	Team Millar MQP	Honda	+1:07.852	5
12	(Australia) Anthony Gobert	Lucky Strike Suzuki	Suzuki	+1:39.033	4
13	(Spain) Alberto Puig	Movistar Honda Pons	Honda	+1:45.597	3
14	(Belgium) Laurent Naveau	Millet Racing	ROC Yamaha	+1 Lap	2
Ret	(Italy) Lucio Pedercini	Team Pedercini	ROC Yamaha	Retirement	
Ret	(Germany) Jürgen Fuchs	Elf 500 ROC	Elf 500	Retirement	
Ret	(Japan) Tadayuki Okada	Repsol YPF Honda Team	Honda	Retirement	
Ret	(Spain) Carlos Checa	Movistar Honda Pons	Honda	Retirement	
Ret	(France) Frederic Protat	Soverex FP Racing	Honda	Retirement	
Ret	(France) Jean-Michel Bayle	Marlboro Team Roberts	Modenas KR3	Retirement	
Ret	(Spain) Sete Gibernau	Yamaha Team Rainey	Yamaha	Retirement	
Ret	(Australia) Kirk McCarthy	World Championship Motorsports	Yamaha	Retirement	
Ret	(Italy) Doriano Romboni	IP Aprilia Racing Team	Aprilia	Retirement	
Ret	(Spain) Juan Borja	Elf 500 ROC	Elf 500	Retirement	

== 250 cc classification ==
Pos	Rider	Manufacturer	Time/Retired	Points
1	(Italy) Max Biaggi	Honda	42:06.724	25
2	(France) Olivier Jacque	Honda	+0.514	20
3	(Japan) Tetsuya Harada	Aprilia	+9.992	16
4	(Germany) Ralf Waldmann	Honda	+13.153	13
5	(Japan) Tohru Ukawa	Honda	+31.776	11
6	(Japan) Takeshi Tsujimura	TSR-Honda	+38.777	10
7	(Italy) Stefano Perugini	Aprilia	+43.740	9
8	(Italy) Giuseppe Fiorillo	Aprilia	+58.722	8
9	(Italy) Cristiano Migliorati	Honda	+59.569	7
10	(Argentina) Sebastian Porto	Aprilia	+1:03.501	6
11	(Spain) José Luis Cardoso	Yamaha	+1:12.403	5
12	(Spain) Emilio Alzamora	Honda	+1:17.559	4
13	(United Kingdom) Jamie Robinson	Suzuki	+1:25.621	3
14	(Japan) Osamu Miyazaki	Yamaha	+1:26.471	2
15	(Italy) Franco Battaini	Yamaha	+1:31.953	1
16	(Spain) Eustaquio Gavira	Aprilia	+1:34.293	
17	(Switzerland) Claudio Vanzetta	Aprilia	+1:58.858	
18	(United States) Kurtis Roberts	Honda	+1 Lap	
19	(Spain) Oscar Sainz	Yamaha	+1 Lap	
20	(Czech Republic) Radomil Rous	Yamaha	+1 Lap	
Ret	(Italy) Luca Boscoscuro	Honda	Retirement	
Ret	(Spain) Idalio Gavira	Aprilia	Retirement	
Ret	(Japan) Haruchika Aoki	Honda	Retirement	
Ret	(Slovakia) Vladimir Castka	Honda	Retirement	
Ret	(Netherlands) Maurice Bolwerk	Honda	Retirement	
Ret	(France) William Costes	Honda	Retirement	
Ret	(Japan) Noriyasu Numata	Suzuki	Retirement	
Ret	(Switzerland) Oliver Petrucciani	Aprilia	Retirement	
Ret	(Czech Republic) Bohumil Staša Jr.	Aprilia	Retirement	
Ret	(Italy) Loris Capirossi	Aprilia	Retirement	

== 125 cc classification ==
Pos	Rider	Manufacturer	Time/Retired	Points
1	(Japan) Noboru Ueda	Honda	42:13.666	25
2	(Japan) Tomomi Manako	Honda	+0.170	20
3	(Italy) Valentino Rossi	Aprilia	+0.328	16
4	(Italy) Roberto Locatelli	Honda	+0.776	13
5	(Italy) Lucio Cecchinello	Honda	+0.883	11
6	(Italy) Gianluigi Scalvini	Honda	+0.960	10
7	(Germany) Steve Jenkner	Aprilia	+1.054	9
8	(Japan) Masaki Tokudome	Aprilia	+1.162	8
9	(Japan) Kazuto Sakata	Aprilia	+3.442	7
10	(Japan) Youichi Ui	Yamaha	+6.062	6
11	(Australia) Garry McCoy	Aprilia	+11.579	5
12	(Italy) Mirko Giansanti	Honda	+11.756	4
13	(Germany) Manfred Geissler	Aprilia	+11.885	3
14	(Czech Republic) Jaroslav Huleš	Honda	+12.801	2
15	(France) Frederic Petit	Honda	+13.289	1
16	(Spain) Enrique Maturana	Yamaha	+29.524	
17	(Italy) Marco Melandri	Honda	+29.622	
18	(Spain) Josep Sarda	Honda	+35.321	
19	(Germany) Dirk Raudies	Honda	+1:04.317	
20	(Germany) Emanuel Buchner	Aprilia	+1:04.517	
21	(Czech Republic) Igor Kaláb	Honda	+1:44.329	
Ret	(Italy) Ivan Goi	Aprilia	Retirement	
Ret	(Czech Republic) Michal Březina	Honda	Retirement	
Ret	(Japan) Masao Azuma	Honda	Retirement	
Ret	(Japan) Yoshiaki Katoh	Yamaha	Retirement	
Ret	(Spain) Angel Nieto Jr	Aprilia	Retirement	
Ret	(Italy) Gino Borsoi	Yamaha	Retirement	
Ret	(United Kingdom) Chris Burns	Honda	Retirement	
Ret	(Spain) Jorge Martínez	Aprilia	Retirement	

Previous race: 1997 British Grand Prix	FIM Grand Prix World Championship; 1997 season	Next race: 1997 Catalan Grand Prix
Previous race: 1996 Czech Republic Grand Prix	Czech Republic Grand Prix	Next race: 1998 Czech Republic Grand Prix
