= 1997 Rio de Janeiro motorcycle Grand Prix =

(Rio de Janeiro (state)) 1997 Rio de Janeiro Grand Prix
Race details
- Race 10 of 15 races in the 1997 Grand Prix motorcycle racing season
- Date: 3 August 1997
- Official name: Lucky Strike Rio Grand Prix
- Location: Autódromo Internacional Nelson Piquet
- Course: Permanent racing facility; 4.933 km (3.065 mi)

500cc
Pole position
- Rider: (Australia) Mick Doohan
- Time: 1:51.955
Fastest lap
- Rider: (Japan) Tadayuki Okada
- Time: 1:51.928
Podium
- First: (Australia) Mick Doohan
- Second: (Japan) Tadayuki Okada
- Third: (Italy) Luca Cadalora

250cc
Pole position
- Rider: (France) Olivier Jacque
- Time: 1:53.870
Fastest lap
- Rider: (France) Olivier Jacque
- Time: 1:54.267
Podium
- First: (France) Olivier Jacque
- Second: (Japan) Tetsuya Harada
- Third: (Japan) Tohru Ukawa

125cc
Pole position
- Rider: (Japan) Noboru Ueda
- Time: 2:00.287
Fastest lap
- Rider: (Italy) Valentino Rossi
- Time: 2:00.074
Podium
- First: (Italy) Valentino Rossi
- Second: (Japan) Noboru Ueda
- Third: (Japan) Youichi Ui

The 1997 Rio de Janeiro motorcycle Grand Prix was the tenth round of the 1997 Grand Prix motorcycle racing season. It took place on 3 August 1997 at the Autódromo Internacional Nelson Piquet.

== 500 cc classification ==
Pos.	Rider	Team	Manufacturer	Time/Retired	Points
1	(Australia) Mick Doohan	Repsol YPF Honda Team	Honda	45:05.793	25
2	(Japan) Tadayuki Okada	Repsol YPF Honda Team	Honda	+0.706	20
3	(Italy) Luca Cadalora	Red Bull Yamaha WCM	Yamaha	+22.535	16
4	(Japan) Nobuatsu Aoki	Rheos Elf FCC TS	Honda	+23.493	13
5	(Japan) Norifumi Abe	Yamaha Team Rainey	Yamaha	+23.769	11
6	(Germany) Jürgen Fuchs	Elf 500 ROC	Elf 500	+29.435	10
7	(Italy) Doriano Romboni	IP Aprilia Racing Team	Aprilia	+41.674	9
8	(France) Jean-Michel Bayle	Marlboro Team Roberts	Modenas KR3	+44.113	8
9	(France) Regis Laconi	Team Tecmas	Honda	+1:02.722	7
10	(Australia) Anthony Gobert	Lucky Strike Suzuki	Suzuki	+1:06.351	6
11	(Netherlands) Jurgen van den Goorbergh	Team Millar MQP	Honda	+1:09.161	5
12	(Australia) Kirk McCarthy	World Championship Motorsports	ROC Yamaha	+1:25.393	4
13	(Australia) Daryl Beattie	Lucky Strike Suzuki	Suzuki	+1:27.215	3
14	(Spain) Alberto Puig	Movistar Honda Pons	Honda	+1:28.898	2
15	(Italy) Lucio Pedercini	Team Pedercini	Yamaha	+1:50.890	1
16	(Belgium) Laurent Naveau	Millet Racing	ROC Yamaha	+1 Lap	
17	(France) Frederic Protat	Soverex FP Racing	Honda	+1 Lap	
Ret	(Spain) Juan Borja	Elf 500 ROC	Elf 500	Retirement	
Ret	(United States) Kenny Roberts Jr.	Marlboro Team Roberts	Modenas KR3	Retirement	
Ret	(Spain) Sete Gibernau	Yamaha Team Rainey	Yamaha	Retirement	
Ret	(Spain) Carlos Checa	Movistar Honda Pons	Honda	Retirement	
Ret	(Brazil) Alex Barros	Honda Gresini	Honda	Retirement	

== 250 cc classification ==
Pos	Rider	Manufacturer	Time/Retired	Points
1	(France) Olivier Jacque	Honda	42:09.114	25
2	(Japan) Tetsuya Harada	Aprilia	+0.233	20
3	(Japan) Tohru Ukawa	Honda	+6.088	16
4	(Italy) Loris Capirossi	Aprilia	+15.065	13
5	(Italy) Max Biaggi	Honda	+22.377	11
6	(Italy) Stefano Perugini	Aprilia	+31.888	10
7	(Japan) Haruchika Aoki	Honda	+47.291	9
8	(Japan) Takeshi Tsujimura	TSR-Honda	+50.732	8
9	(Argentina) Sebastian Porto	Aprilia	+52.808	7
10	(United Kingdom) Jeremy McWilliams	Honda	+53.489	6
11	(Italy) Cristiano Migliorati	Honda	+1:00.520	5
12	(Germany) Ralf Waldmann	Honda	+1:04.124	4
13	(Italy) Luca Boscoscuro	Honda	+1:05.342	3
14	(Spain) Emilio Alzamora	Honda	+1:07.396	2
15	(Spain) José Luis Cardoso	Yamaha	+1:09.352	1
16	(Italy) Giuseppe Fiorillo	Aprilia	+1:10.294	
17	(Switzerland) Oliver Petrucciani	Aprilia	+1:37.897	
18	(United States) Kurtis Roberts	Honda	+1:57.163	
19	(Spain) Eustaquio Gavira	Aprilia	+1 Lap	
Ret	(Spain) Idalio Gavira	Aprilia	Retirement	
Ret	(Argentina) Federico Gartner	Honda	Retirement	
Ret	(Spain) Luis d'Antin	Yamaha	Retirement	
Ret	(Sweden) Johann Stigefelt	Suzuki	Retirement	
Ret	(France) William Costes	Honda	Retirement	
Ret	(Japan) Noriyasu Numata	Suzuki	Retirement	
Ret	(Japan) Osamu Miyazaki	Yamaha	Retirement	

== 125 cc classification ==
Pos	Rider	Manufacturer	Time/Retired	Points
1	(Italy) Valentino Rossi	Aprilia	42:32.218	25
2	(Japan) Noboru Ueda	Honda	+1.379	20
3	(Japan) Youichi Ui	Yamaha	+8.481	16
4	(Japan) Tomomi Manako	Honda	+9.015	13
5	(Japan) Kazuto Sakata	Aprilia	+27.102	11
6	(Italy) Mirko Giansanti	Honda	+27.240	10
7	(Spain) Jorge Martinez	Aprilia	+27.391	9
8	(Italy) Lucio Cecchinello	Honda	+27.454	8
9	(France) Frederic Petit	Honda	+27.582	7
10	(Japan) Masaki Tokudome	Aprilia	+27.731	6
11	(Italy) Roberto Locatelli	Honda	+27.981	5
12	(Germany) Steve Jenkner	Aprilia	+37.002	4
13	(Australia) Garry McCoy	Aprilia	+37.228	3
14	(Italy) Gino Borsoi	Yamaha	+39.196	2
15	(Spain) Enrique Maturana	Yamaha	+39.514	1
16	(Japan) Yoshiaki Katoh	Yamaha	+48.621	
17	(Japan) Masao Azuma	Honda	+57.139	
18	(Italy) Ivan Goi	Aprilia	+1:03.048	
19	(Spain) Josep Sarda	Honda	+1:07.347	
20	(Germany) Dirk Raudies	Honda	+1:12.489	
21	(Brazil) Adilson Zaccari	Honda	+1 Lap	
22	(Brazil) César Barros	Honda	+1 Lap	
23	(Brazil) Carlos Medeiros	Honda	+1 Lap	
24	(Brazil) Renato Velludo	Honda	+1 Lap	
25	(Brazil) Eraldo Tome	Honda	+1 Lap	
Ret	(Austria) Benny Jerzenbeck	Honda	Retirement	
Ret	(Brazil) Cristiano Irias-Vieira	Honda	Retirement	
Ret	(Spain) Angel Nieto Jr	Aprilia	Retirement	
Ret	(Czech Republic) Jaroslav Hules	Honda	Retirement	
Ret	(Germany) Manfred Geissler	Aprilia	Retirement	
Ret	(Italy) Gianluigi Scalvini	Honda	Retirement	

Previous race: 1997 German Grand Prix	FIM Grand Prix World Championship; 1997 season	Next race: 1997 British Grand Prix
Previous race: 1996 Rio de Janeiro Grand Prix	Rio de Janeiro Grand Prix	Next race: 1999 Rio de Janeiro Grand Prix
