= 1997 German motorcycle Grand Prix =

(Germany) 1997 German Grand Prix
Race details
- Race 9 of 15 races in the 1997 Grand Prix motorcycle racing season
- Date: 20 July 1997
- Official name: ADAC Motorrad Grand Prix Deutschland
- Location: Nürburgring
- Course: Permanent racing facility; 4.550 km (2.827 mi)

500cc
Pole position
- Rider: (Australia) Mick Doohan
- Time: 1:38.425
Fastest lap
- Rider: (Australia) Mick Doohan
- Time: 1:39.051
Podium
- First: (Australia) Mick Doohan
- Second: (Japan) Tadayuki Okada
- Third: (Japan) Takuma Aoki

250cc
Pole position
- Rider: (France) Olivier Jacque
- Time: 1:40.361
Fastest lap
- Rider: (Japan) Tetsuya Harada
- Time: 1:40.993
Podium
- First: (Japan) Tetsuya Harada
- Second: (France) Olivier Jacque
- Third: (Germany) Ralf Waldmann

125cc
Pole position
- Rider: (Italy) Valentino Rossi
- Time: 1:47.160
Fastest lap
- Rider: (Japan) Yoshiaki Katoh
- Time: 2:01.546
Podium
- First: (Italy) Valentino Rossi
- Second: (Japan) Yoshiaki Katoh
- Third: (Germany) Manfred Geissler

The 1997 German motorcycle Grand Prix was the ninth round of the 1997 Grand Prix motorcycle racing season. It took place on 20 July 1997 at the Nürburgring.

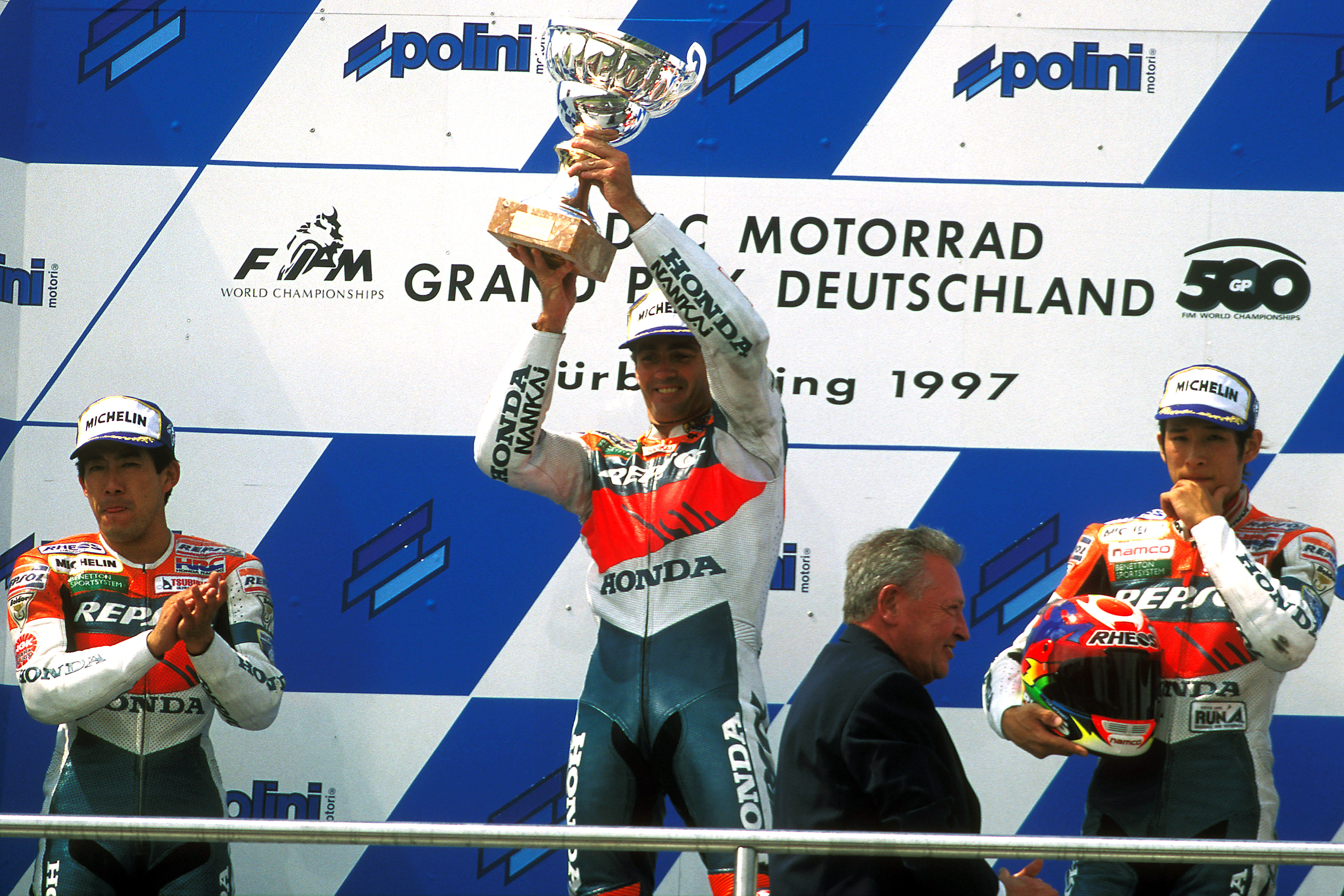
Tadayuki Okada, Mick Doohan and Takuma Aoki, celebrating on the podium after finishing second, first and third in the 500cc race.

== 500 cc classification ==
Pos.	Rider	Team	Manufacturer	Time/Retired	Points
1	(Australia) Mick Doohan	Repsol YPF Honda Team	Honda	44:55.117	25
2	(Japan) Tadayuki Okada	Repsol YPF Honda Team	Honda	+5.690	20
3	(Japan) Takuma Aoki	Repsol Honda	Honda	+24.873	16
4	(Japan) Nobuatsu Aoki	Rheos Elf FCC TS	Honda	+25.157	13
5	(Italy) Doriano Romboni	IP Aprilia Racing Team	Aprilia	+35.884	11
6	(Brazil) Alex Barros	Honda Gresini	Honda	+38.907	10
7	(Spain) Sete Gibernau	Yamaha Team Rainey	Yamaha	+39.541	9
8	(Spain) Juan Borja	Elf 500 ROC	Elf 500	+52.475	8
9	(Australia) Anthony Gobert	Lucky Strike Suzuki	Suzuki	+55.283	7
10	(Spain) Alberto Puig	Movistar Honda Pons	Honda	+55.436	6
11	(Netherlands) Jurgen van den Goorbergh	Team Millar MQP	Honda	+55.794	5
12	(Australia) Daryl Beattie	Lucky Strike Suzuki	Suzuki	+1:02.772	4
13	(Germany) Jürgen Fuchs	Elf 500 ROC	Elf 500	+1:17.345	3
14	(France) Bernard Garcia	Team Tecmas	Honda	+1:22.292	2
15	(Australia) Kirk McCarthy	World Championship Motorsports	ROC Yamaha	+1 Lap	1
16	(Belgium) Laurent Naveau	Millet Racing	ROC Yamaha	+1 Lap	
Ret	(Italy) Lucio Pedercini	Team Pedercini	ROC Yamaha	Retirement	
Ret	(Japan) Norifumi Abe	Yamaha Team Rainey	Yamaha	Retirement	
Ret	(Italy) Luca Cadalora	Red Bull Yamaha WCM	Yamaha	Retirement	
Ret	(Spain) Carlos Checa	Movistar Honda Pons	Honda	Retirement	
Ret	(France) Frederic Protat	Soverex FP Racing	Honda	Retirement	
Ret	(France) Jean-Michel Bayle	Marlboro Team Roberts	Modenas KR3	Retirement	
Ret	(United States) Kenny Roberts Jr.	Marlboro Team Roberts	Modenas KR3	Retirement	

== 250 cc classification ==
Pos	Rider	Manufacturer	Time/Retired	Points
1	(Japan) Tetsuya Harada	Aprilia	42:36.407	25
2	(France) Olivier Jacque	Honda	+0.093	20
3	(Germany) Ralf Waldmann	Honda	+0.106	16
4	(Italy) Max Biaggi	Honda	+0.135	13
5	(Italy) Loris Capirossi	Aprilia	+28.183	11
6	(Japan) Tohru Ukawa	Honda	+34.325	10
7	(Japan) Noriyasu Numata	Suzuki	+41.082	9
8	(United Kingdom) Jeremy McWilliams	Honda	+41.082	8
9	(Japan) Haruchika Aoki	Honda	+42.656	7
10	(Spain) Emilio Alzamora	Honda	+53.170	6
11	(Italy) Franco Battaini	Yamaha	+59.502	5
12	(Italy) Giuseppe Fiorillo	Aprilia	+1:12.687	4
13	(Japan) Takeshi Tsujimura	TSR-Honda	+1:14.481	3
14	(Italy) Luca Boscoscuro	Honda	+1:17.778	2
15	(Italy) Cristiano Migliorati	Honda	+1:18.013	1
16	(Argentina) Sebastian Porto	Aprilia	+1:18.245	
17	(Spain) Luis d'Antin	Yamaha	+1:18.483	
18	(Japan) Osamu Miyazaki	Yamaha	+1:18.519	
19	(Switzerland) Oliver Petrucciani	Aprilia	+1:18.883	
20	(France) William Costes	Honda	+1:19.530	
21	(Spain) Eustaquio Gavira	Aprilia	+1:32.590	
22	(United States) Kurtis Roberts	Honda	+1 Lap	
23	(Germany) Jurgen Lingg	Honda	+1 Lap	
24	(Germany) Matthias Neukirchen	Yamaha	+1 Lap	
25	(Germany) Stefan Kruse	Honda	+1 Lap	
Ret	(Spain) Idalio Gavira	Aprilia	Retirement	
Ret	(United Kingdom) Jamie Robinson	Suzuki	Retirement	
Ret	(Spain) José Luis Cardoso	Yamaha	Retirement	
Ret	(Italy) Stefano Perugini	Aprilia	Retirement	

== 125 cc classification ==
Pos	Rider	Manufacturer	Time/Retired	Points
1	(Italy) Valentino Rossi	Aprilia	48:05.749	25
2	(Japan) Yoshiaki Katoh	Yamaha	+0.569	20
3	(Germany) Manfred Geissler	Aprilia	+13.523	16
4	(France) Frederic Petit	Honda	+39.485	13
5	(Italy) Lucio Cecchinello	Honda	+40.020	11
6	(Spain) Jorge Martinez	Aprilia	+40.040	10
7	(Italy) Mirko Giansanti	Honda	+59.415	9
8	(Italy) Gino Borsoi	Yamaha	+1:01.314	8
9	(Japan) Masaki Tokudome	Aprilia	+1:03.505	7
10	(Spain) Enrique Maturana	Yamaha	+1:04.228	6
11	(Spain) Angel Nieto Jr	Aprilia	+1:07.668	5
12	(Italy) Gianluigi Scalvini	Honda	+1:14.204	4
13	(Italy) Ivan Goi	Aprilia	+1:15.843	3
14	(Germany) Alex Hofmann	Yamaha	+2:06.339	2
15	(Austria) Benny Jerzenbeck	Honda	+1 Lap	1
16	(Germany) Klaus Nohles	Honda	+2 Laps	
Ret	(Japan) Masao Azuma	Honda	Retirement	
Ret	(Japan) Tomomi Manako	Honda	Retirement	
Ret	(Germany) Emanuel Buchner	Aprilia	Retirement	
Ret	(Spain) Josep Sarda	Honda	Retirement	
Ret	(Japan) Kazuto Sakata	Aprilia	Retirement	
Ret	(Germany) Dirk Raudies	Honda	Retirement	
Ret	(Czech Republic) Jaroslav Hules	Honda	Retirement	
Ret	(Germany) Mark Stief	Honda	Retirement	
Ret	(Italy) Roberto Locatelli	Honda	Retirement	
Ret	(Japan) Youichi Ui	Yamaha	Retirement	
Ret	(Germany) Dirk Heidolf	Honda	Retirement	
Ret	(Germany) Oliver Perschke	Honda	Retirement	
Ret	(Japan) Noboru Ueda	Honda	Retirement	
Ret	(Australia) Garry McCoy	Aprilia	Retirement	

Previous race: 1997 City of Imola Grand Prix	FIM Grand Prix World Championship; 1997 season	Next race: 1997 Rio de Janeiro Grand Prix
Previous race: 1996 German Grand Prix	German Grand Prix	Next race: 1998 German Grand Prix
