= 1997 Spanish motorcycle Grand Prix =

(Spain) 1997 Spanish Grand Prix
Race details
- Race 3 of 15 races in the 1997 Grand Prix motorcycle racing season
- Date: 4 May 1997
- Official name: Gran Premio Lucky Strike de España
- Location: Circuito de Jerez
- Course: Permanent racing facility; 4.423 km (2.748 mi)

500cc
Pole position
- Rider: (Japan) Tadayuki Okada
- Time: 1:43.403
Fastest lap
- Rider: (Spain) Àlex Crivillé
- Time: 1:44.564
Podium
- First: (Spain) Àlex Crivillé
- Second: (Australia) Mick Doohan
- Third: (Japan) Tadayuki Okada

250cc
Pole position
- Rider: (Germany) Ralf Waldmann
- Time: 1:44.770
Fastest lap
- Rider: (Germany) Ralf Waldmann
- Time: 1:45.483
Podium
- First: (Germany) Ralf Waldmann
- Second: (Japan) Tetsuya Harada
- Third: (Italy) Max Biaggi

125cc
Pole position
- Rider: (Spain) Jorge Martínez
- Time: 1:49.582
Fastest lap
- Rider: (Italy) Valentino Rossi
- Time: 1:49.604
Podium
- First: (Italy) Valentino Rossi
- Second: (Japan) Noboru Ueda
- Third: (Spain) Jorge Martínez

The 1997 Spanish motorcycle Grand Prix was the third round of the 1997 Grand Prix motorcycle racing season. It took place on 4 May 1997 at the Circuito Permanente de Jerez.

== 500 cc classification ==
Pos.	Rider	Team	Manufacturer	Time/Retired	Points
1	(Spain) Àlex Crivillé	Repsol YPF Honda Team	Honda	47:30.624	25
2	(Australia) Mick Doohan	Repsol YPF Honda Team	Honda	+5.636	20
3	(Japan) Tadayuki Okada	Repsol YPF Honda Team	Honda	+5.670	16
4	(Japan) Takuma Aoki	Repsol Honda	Honda	+22.703	13
5	(Japan) Nobuatsu Aoki	Rheos Elf FCC TS	Honda	+28.414	11
6	(Italy) Doriano Romboni	IP Aprilia Racing Team	Aprilia	+31.762	10
7	(Japan) Norifumi Abe	Yamaha Team Rainey	Yamaha	+32.488	9
8	(Brazil) Alex Barros	Honda Gresini	Honda	+33.306	8
9	(Spain) Sete Gibernau	Yamaha Team Rainey	Yamaha	+33.557	7
10	(France) Regis Laconi	Team Tecmas	Honda	+41.982	6
11	(Italy) Luca Cadalora	Yamaha Promotor Racing	Yamaha	+45.002	5
12	(Australia) Daryl Beattie	Lucky Strike Suzuki	Suzuki	+49.769	4
13	(France) Jean-Michel Bayle	Marlboro Team Roberts	Modenas KR3	+52.457	3
14	(Netherlands) Jurgen van den Goorbergh	Team Millar MQP	Honda	+53.460	2
15	(Australia) Kirk McCarthy	World Championship Motorsports	ROC Yamaha	+1:36.468	1
16	(Germany) Jürgen Fuchs	Elf 500 ROC	Elf 500	+1:31.257	
17	(Italy) Lucio Pedercini	Team Pedercini	ROC Yamaha	+1:38.996	
18	(United States) Kenny Roberts Jr.	Marlboro Team Roberts	Modenas KR3	+1:41.246	
19	(Belgium) Laurent Naveau	Millet Racing	ROC Yamaha	+1 Lap	
Ret	(Spain) Carlos Checa	Movistar Honda Pons	Honda	Retirement	
Ret	(Australia) Peter Goddard	Lucky Strike Suzuki	Suzuki	Retirement	
Ret	(Australia) Troy Corser	Yamaha Promotor Racing	Yamaha	Retirement	
Ret	(France) Frederic Protat	Soverex FP Racing	ROC Yamaha	Retirement	
Ret	(Spain) Alberto Puig	Movistar Honda Pons	Honda	Retirement	

== 250 cc classification ==
Pos	Rider	Manufacturer	Time/Retired	Points
1	(Germany) Ralf Waldmann	Honda	46:03.640	25
2	(Japan) Tetsuya Harada	Aprilia	+12.724	20
3	(Italy) Max Biaggi	Honda	+19.428	16
4	(Japan) Takeshi Tsujimura	TSR-Honda	+30.257	13
5	(Japan) Haruchika Aoki	Honda	+30.744	11
6	(Italy) Stefano Perugini	Aprilia	+36.480	10
7	(France) Olivier Jacque	Honda	+41.960	9
8	(Japan) Noriyasu Numata	Suzuki	+47.000	8
9	(United Kingdom) Jeremy McWilliams	Honda	+58.000	7
10	(Spain) José Luis Cardoso	Yamaha	+58.000	6
11	(Spain) Luis d'Antin	Yamaha	+59.288	5
12	(Japan) Osamu Miyazaki	Yamaha	+1:00.324	4
13	(Switzerland) Oliver Petrucciani	Aprilia	+1:03.231	3
14	(Italy) Franco Battaini	Yamaha	+1:03.584	2
15	(Italy) Luca Boscoscuro	Honda	+1:07.830	1
16	(United Kingdom) Jamie Robinson	Suzuki	+1:15.710	
17	(Spain) Eustaquio Gavira	Aprilia	+1:26.998	
18	(Spain) Oscar Sainz	Aprilia	+1:27.370	
19	(France) William Costes	Honda	+1:31.354	
Ret	(Spain) José Martin	Aprilia	Retirement	
Ret	(United States) Kurtis Roberts	Aprilia	Retirement	
Ret	(Japan) Tohru Ukawa	Honda	Retirement	
Ret	(Spain) Ismael Bonilla	Honda	Retirement	
Ret	(Italy) Giuseppe Fiorillo	Aprilia	Retirement	
Ret	(Spain) Jesus Perez	Honda	Retirement	
Ret	(Spain) Idalio Gavira	Aprilia	Retirement	
Ret	(Italy) Cristiano Migliorati	Honda	Retirement	
Ret	(Argentina) Sebastian Porto	Aprilia	Retirement	
Ret	(Italy) Loris Capirossi	Aprilia	Retirement	

== 125 cc classification ==
Pos	Rider	Manufacturer	Time/Retired	Points
1	(Italy) Valentino Rossi	Aprilia	42:30.676	25
2	(Japan) Noboru Ueda	Honda	+0.358	20
3	(Spain) Jorge Martinez	Aprilia	+0.500	16
4	(Japan) Masaki Tokudome	Aprilia	+1.343	13
5	(Japan) Tomomi Manako	Honda	+1.508	11
6	(Germany) Peter Öttl	Aprilia	+8.100	10
7	(Japan) Kazuto Sakata	Aprilia	+10.300	9
8	(Italy) Roberto Locatelli	Honda	+14.560	8
9	(Japan) Masao Azuma	Honda	+18.800	7
10	(Japan) Yoshiaki Katoh	Yamaha	+20.090	6
11	(Italy) Ivan Goi	Aprilia	+21.586	5
12	(Italy) Mirko Giansanti	Honda	+24.467	4
13	(France) Frederic Petit	Honda	+24.844	3
14	(Czech Republic) Jaroslav Hules	Honda	+24.910	2
15	(Italy) Lucio Cecchinello	Honda	+27.114	1
16	(Spain) Fonsi Nieto	Aprilia	+46.271	
17	(Germany) Manfred Geissler	Honda	+46.846	
18	(Germany) Steve Jenkner	Aprilia	+46.897	
19	(Spain) Enrique Maturana	Yamaha	+46.922	
20	(Germany) Dirk Raudies	Honda	+47.591	
21	(Italy) Gianluigi Scalvini	Honda	+55.166	
22	(Japan) Youichi Ui	Yamaha	+1:04.376	
23	(Italy) Gino Borsoi	Yamaha	+1:25.868	
24	(Spain) Angel Nieto Jr	Aprilia	+1:30.711	
25	(Spain) Vicente Esparragoso	Yamaha	+1:43.319	
26	(Spain) Josep Sarda	Honda	+1:43.449	
Ret	(Spain) Jeronimo Vidal	Aprilia	Retirement	
Ret	(Spain) José Ramirez	Yamaha	Retirement	
Ret	(Spain) Alvaro Molina	Honda	Retirement	
Ret	(Australia) Garry McCoy	Aprilia	Retirement	

Previous race: 1997 Japanese Grand Prix	FIM Grand Prix World Championship; 1997 season	Next race: 1997 Italian Grand Prix
Previous race: 1996 Spanish Grand Prix	Spanish Grand Prix	Next race: 1998 Spanish Grand Prix
