= Modenas KR3 =

Racing motorcycle

- Manufacturer: Team Roberts
- Also called: Proton KR3
- Production: 1997–2003
- Predecessor: None
- Successor: Proton KR5
- Engine: 500 cc two-stroke V3
- Transmission: Chain

The Modenas KR3 was a racing motorcycle designed and built by Team Roberts and funded by the Malaysian motorcycle company Modenas. The bike was used in the 500cc class of grand Prix motorcycle racing from 1997; however since 2001 the bike was renamed as Proton KR3 due to increased involvement of the Malaysian automobile company Proton. Both Proton and Modenas are owned by Malaysian conglomerate DRB-HICOM.

The KR3 was used until 2003, when it was replaced mid-season by the four-stroke Proton KR5 MotoGP machine.

== History ==
=== Background ===
The origins of the KR3 lie with the strained relationship between three-time 500cc champion Kenny Roberts, team manager of the Factory Yamaha team, and the Japanese manufacturer. After his top rider Wayne Rainey became paralysed from the chest down due to a crash he sustained at the 1993 Italian Grand Prix and Yamaha's rivals Honda and Mick Doohan took multiple titles, Roberts became increasingly unsatisfied with Yamaha's working method in the mid-1990s. He was constantly unhappy with the progress of their bikes and even complained many times publicly that the factory did not listen to his feedback on how to improve their YZRs.

Because of this, he made an announcement that surprised everyone in 1996: at the end of the season he was breaking away from the Factory Yamaha team after 25 years of close collaboration, working together with the Modenas company to create a new motorcycle for the newly formed Team Roberts in 1997. The main reasons why Modenas decided to work together with Roberts was for two reasons: The company hoped that some of the technology would eventually make their way into their future models, and that participation in the 500cc would make their brand more known amongst the public.

=== Development ===
The KR team decided to move the base of operations to Banbury, in the Motorsport Valley in the United Kingdom where some Formula 1 and race car teams are based, and began working together with Tom Walkinshaw Racing (TWR).

They decided to create a unique three-cylinder, two-stroke, 500cc machine since the rules at the time gave three-cylinder machines a 15 kg weight advantage over the usual four-cylinder bikes (minimum weight of 115 kg instead of 130 kg). The idea was that the lower weight allowed the bike to be more agile and carry more speed mid-corner. This was also deemed as an advantage as the racetracks during this time had more corners than long straights for the four-cylinder machines to utilize, some examples being Shah Alam and Donington Park. However, they also were aware that a three-cylinder bike would make less horsepower compared to a four-cylinder one. To solve this problem, the team focused on improving volumetric efficiency (how much fuel-air mixture the engine could induct).

The engine design was supervised by Warren Willing and Bud Aksland, the father of the team's manager Chuck Aksland, and was built by TWR. They created a 498cc engine with "square" dimensions i.e. same bore and stroke figures of 59.6 mm x 59.6 mm. The Vee-angle between the cylinders was very wide set at 135° with two cylinders down below and one up top. The engine lacked a balance shaft with a view to improve efficiency and weight, however that feature caused severe vibrations.

The frame was designed to give the bike better handling characteristics. The KR team worked with chassis maker Fabrication Techniques, which resulted in an aluminium twin-spar "deltabox" frame that was reportedly smaller and lighter than conventional Japanese designs at the time. The headstock featured eccentric carriers which would allow adjustments of the steering's rake angle and trail. There were also eccentric carriers in the swingarm mount which were created to adjust the height of the swingarm pivot. These were completely new and unheard of at the time. Even the fueling system was ahead of its time, the team adopting electronic carburetors without float bowls which used ducted air to atomize the fuel, much like a fuel-injection system. KR hoped that such a setup would avoid the fuel from emulsifying from intense vibrations. Arrow made an exhaust system for the engine. The result of this was an engine that produced 160 hp in the early years. The bodywork was designed in such a way that it would wrap tightly around the frame for a smaller frontal profile. Consequently, the radiator was moved to under the seat where ducts supplied cooling air to it.

=== Evolution ===
During 1998 a brand new engine (Spec Two) was developed featuring a reversed layout (two cylinders up, one down) with an included angle narrowed to 114° and a balance shaft. It was designed with the help of Japanese engineers Yoichi Oguma and Mike Maekawa and many parts were manufactured by Japanese suppliers with final assembly done at Team Roberts' workshop, excluding TWR. Conventional features were adopted, such Keihin carburetors instead of bespoke units and the radiator placed at the front. Compared to the older unit, the new engine was more reliable while producing around 170 hp on unleaded fuel (mandatory since 1998). However it was also longer and heavier, causing handling problems due to the altered weight distribution. In 1999 the problems worsened, due to the switch from Dunlop to Michelin tires and the departure of Warren Willing who left the team to join Suzuki.

For 2000 Roberts produced a Spec Three engine with a vee-angle of 112° and a relocated balance shaft, resulting in a shorter and lighter unit while keeping the reliability and performance of the Spec Two engine.

== Season progress ==
=== 1997 ===
At the debut year, the rider line-up consisted of Kenny Roberts Jr. and Jean-Michel Bayle and team's sponsor was Marlboro. It was initially thought that the engine's layout gave the engine good self-balancing inertial forces (of the pistons going up and down and the rotating crankshaft), but the bike frequently underperformed and suffered many breakdowns (especially crankshaft spreadings frequently broke down) as well as rider DNFs, - 14 to be exact - achieving a best place finish of eighth, scoring a total of 68 points and ending fifth in the constructor standings. Additionally, there was no controlled-tyre ruling back then, thus the tyres were manufactured to each specific bike in the paddock. New and small teams such as the KR team often had to use old tyres or those designed for other bikes, sometimes even both. It meant that KR could not capitalize on their handling.

=== 1998 ===
For the 1998 season, Bayle was replaced with Ralf Waldmann. The team continued to underperform all throughout the year, but did better than its debut year and scored a total of 105 points with a best place finish of sixth, courtesy of Roberts Jr, finishing fourth in the constructor standings.. The KR3 was supremely fast in midcorner and there were other riders who commented that they were led into entering corners too fast behind it. However, when the situation was reversed, the KR3 riders found themselves blocked by the slower four-cylinder machines and then outgunned at the corner exits.

=== 1999 ===
In 1999, the rider line-up significantly changed. Kenny Roberts Jr. left the team and went to the Factory Suzuki team. His replacement came in the form of an American rookie called Mike Hale, along with three replacement drivers; José David de Gea, Mark Willis and James Whitham. KR lost its Marlboro sponsorship and renamed itself before the start of the season, going by the name of Proton KR Modenas after Proton decided to sponsor the team.

The lack of experience amongst the riders did not help and the team only scored a total of 17 points - their worst result ever - and only managed a best-place finish of twelfth. The team also finished a lowly seventh in the constructor championship.

=== 2000 ===
The KR team decided to change its rider line-up once more in 2000, letting go of Mike Hale and making David de Gea a permanent rider for the season, along with Luca Cadalora, Anthony Gobert and Mark Willis as replacement riders when José was not available.

The team did better than last year but still struggled compared to the competition, earning 30 points, scoring a best-place finish of eighth and finishing sixth in the constructor championship.

=== 2001 ===
In 2001, Proton took over the Kenny Roberts team and changed its name to Proton Team KR. The bike name changed as well, the new name being the Proton KR3. In terms of rider line-up, David de Gea was replaced with Dutch rider Jurgen van den Goorbergh and the replacement riders were replaced with a new wildcard rider: Kurtis Roberts.

The team performed more consistently and even managed to outscore some satellite Yamaha and Honda teams on certain occasions. Overall, the team scored 65 points, managed a best-place finish of seventh and finished fourth in the constructor championship, equalling the result of its debut year in 1997.

=== 2002 ===
2002 would be the best year for the team. van der Goorbergh was let go and the team decided to get two regular riders again: the experienced Nobuatsu Aoki and Jeremy McWilliams, along with David García as a wildcard rider. McWilliams surprised friend and foe by scoring the team's first provisional pole at the 2002 German Grand Prix and the only real pole position at the 2002 Australian Grand Prix on the KR3 machine and the team performed consistently throughout the season, scoring a total of 122 points - the most the team had ever scored -, getting a best-place finish of sixth and finishing fourth in the constructor standings - outscoring the new factory Aprilia and Kawasaki teams as a result.

=== 2003 ===
No riser line-ups occurred in 2003, and no replacement or wildcard riders were called in either. This was the last year for the bike as it was gradually replaced by the newer Proton KR5 motorbike during this season, and would be made obsolete completely from 2004 onwards.

The team struggled more than least compared to its competitors. It reached a total of 46 points, got a best-place finish of sixth and finished sixth in the constructor standings, narrowly losing out to the Factory Suzuki team but staying well ahead of the factory Kawasaki team.

== Specifications ==
1997 Modenas KR3 Specifications
Engine
Engine type:	135° 2-stroke V-3 (1 cylinder down - 2 up)
Displacement:	499 cm^{3} (Bore 59.6 x Stroke 59.6 mm)
Ignition:	
Fuel System:	Electronic carburetors without float bowls
Fuel:	
Lubricants:	Castrol
Data recording:	B.R.A.I.N
Maximum power:	160 hp
Maximum speed:	^200 km/h
Exhaust:	3
Transmission
Type:	Extractable sequential 6-speed
Primary drive:	Gear
Final drive:	Chain
Chassis and running gear
Frame type:	Aluminum frame
Front/rear tyres:	Michelin
Weight:	120 kg / 264 lbs
Fuel capacity:	32 liters
