= Kirk McCarthy =

Australian motorcycle racer (1966-2004)

- Nationality: (Australia) Australian
- Born: 18 November 1966
- Died: 15 August 2004 (aged 37)
Motorcycle racing career statistics
Grand Prix motorcycle racing
Active years	1997
Team	Yamaha
Championships	0
Starts / Wins / Podiums / Poles / F. laps / Points; 15 / 0 / 0 / 0 / 0 / 20
Superbike World Championship
Active years	1992, 1994–1996, 1999
Manufacturers	Suzuki, Honda
1999 championship position	N/C
Starts / Wins / Podiums / Poles / F. laps / Points; 35 / 0 / 0 / 0 / 0 / 52
Supersport World Championship
Active years	1998
Manufacturers	Honda
1998 championship position	44th (3 pts)
Starts / Wins / Podiums / Poles / F. laps / Points; 5 / 0 / 0 / 0 / 0 / 3

Kirk Richard McCarthy (18 November 1966 – 15 August 2004), in Melbourne Victoria, Australia, was an Australian motorcycle road racer who competed in several major championships both at home and internationally. He was killed in an Australian Superbike Championship race at Queensland Raceway in 2004.

== Superbikes ==
McCarthy began racing in the Australian Superbike Championship in 1992, for the Ansett Suzuki team. In 1994 he joined the crack Winfield Honda team, and went on to win the 1995 title.

This earned McCarthy a factory Superbike World Championship ride with Suzuki for 1996, finishing 13th overall without a podium. In 1998, he did five Supersport World Championship race's (one step below World Superbike, with less powerful machines) on a Castrol Honda finishing only one race in the points.

A year in the German Superbike Championship for Suzuki, and two years back with Castrol Honda but in the British Supersport Championship, followed. In 2002, McCarthy won the AMA Pro Thunder series on a Ducati (having initially entered the season-opener as a one-off rider), before he returned to Australia, running his family's farm alongside his racing commitments. He was seventh overall in the Australian Superbike Championship in 2003.

== Grand Prix ==
McCarthy contested the 1997 500cc World Championship on a Red Bull Yamaha, (with a best result of 12th and best grid position of 18th)

== Legacy ==
In conjunction with a number of industry partners, McCarthy's family has established an award program to assist young riders in contesting future Australian Superbike Championship (ASC) seasons.

Each year, one rider will be selected to receive the Kirk McCarthy Memorial Award, which will be in the form of financial and product support to contest the following year's ASC. The award is open to riders in all ASC classes.

A perpetual trophy will be awarded to the recipient, who will also receive a replica of the trophy at the annual ASC presentation dinner.

== Career results ==
=== Grand Prix ===
Year	Class	Team	Machine	1	2	3	4	5	6	7	8	9	10	11	12	13	14	15	Points	Rank
1997	500cc	World Championship Motorsports	ROC-Yamaha	MAL; Ret	JPN; 16	ESP; 15	ITA; 14	AUT; 17	FRA; Ret	NED; Ret	IMO; 15								20	21st
1997	500cc	Red Bull Yamaha WCM	Yamaha YZR500									GER; 15	BRA; 12	GBR; 12	CZE; Ret	CAT; 13	INA; 15	AUS; 13	20	21st

=== World Superbike Championship ===
(key) (Races in bold indicate pole position) (Races in italics indicate fastest lap)

Year	Make	1		2		3		4		5		6		7		8		9		10		11		12		13		Pos	Pts
Year	Make	R1	R2	R1	R2	R1	R2	R1	R2	R1	R2	R1	R2	R1	R2	R1	R2	R1	R2	R1	R2	R1	R2	R1	R2	R1	R2	Pos	Pts
1992	Suzuki	SPA1	SPA1	GBR	GBR	GER	GER	BEL	BEL	SPA2	SPA2	AUT	AUT	ITA1	ITA1	MAL	MAL	JPN	JPN	NED	NED	ITA2	ITA2	AUS; 17	AUS; 15	NZL	NZL	**75th**	**1**
1994	Honda	GBR1	GBR1	GER	GER	RSM	RSM	SPA	SPA	AUT	AUT	IND	IND	JPN	JPN	NED	NED	ITA	ITA	GBR2	GBR2	AUS; 6	AUS; 5					**29th**	**21**
1995	Honda	GER	GER	RSM	RSM	GBR	GBR	ITA	ITA	SPA	SPA	AUT	AUT	USA	USA	EUR	EUR	JPN	JPN	NED	NED	IND	IND	AUS; 8	AUS; Ret			**33rd**	**8**
1996	Suzuki	RSM; Ret	RSM; 12	GBR; 13	GBR; 14	GER; 10	GER; 9	ITA; 8	ITA; 8	CZH; 14	CZH; Ret	USA; 10	USA; 13	EUR; Ret	EUR; 10	IND; 13	IND; 10	JPN; 17	JPN; 18	NED; 14	NED; 9	SPA; Ret	SPA; 15	AUS; 10	AUS; 15			**20th**	**22**
1999	Suzuki	RSA	RSA	AUS	AUS	GBR	GBR	SPA	SPA	ITA; 19	ITA; Ret	GER1; Ret	GER1; 20	RSM	RSM	USA	USA	EUR	EUR	AUT	AUT	NED	NED	GER2	GER2	JAP	JAP	**NC**	**0**

=== Supersport World Championship ===
Year	Make	1	2	3	4	5	6	7	8	9	10	Pos	Pts
1998	Honda	GBR	ITA	SPA	GER	SMR	RSA; Ret	USA; Ret	EUR; 22	AUT; 21	NED; 13	**44th**	**3**

Preceded by Anthony Gobert	Australian Superbike Champion; 1995	Succeeded by Peter Goddard
