= Kurtis Roberts =

American motorcycle racer

- Nationality: American
Motorcycle racing career statistics
Grand Prix motorcycle racing
Active years	1997, 2001, 2004 - 2005, 2007
First race	1997 250cc Malaysian Grand Prix
Last race	2007 MotoGP Valencian Grand Prix
Team(s)	Aprilia, Honda, Proton KR, KR212V
Championships	0
Starts / Wins / Podiums / Poles / F. laps / Points; 34 / 0 / 0 / 0 / 0 / 11

Kurtis Roberts (born 17 November 1978 in Turlock, California) is an American motorcycle road racer. He is the youngest son of three-time 500cc World Champion Kenny Roberts, and the younger brother of 2000 500cc World Champion Kenny Roberts, Jr. He has raced in most major US and international motorcycle racing championships, in both Grand Prix and Superbike categories.

== AMA ==
In 1998, Roberts joined Erion Honda, starting out in 250s as he had experience of this level. He was runner-up in the AMA 250cc series that year, also riding in a few 600cc Supersport races. In both 1999 and 2000, he won the AMA Formula Xtreme series, adding the 600cc Supersport in 2000. Moving to the prestigious American Honda team, his first three AMA Superbike Championship podium finishes came in 2001 - taking his first wins and third overall in 2003, after missing much of 2002 due to injury. 2005 was a disastrous return to Erion, despite a second place in the Daytona 200.

== International ==
In 1997, Roberts contested the 250cc World Championship.

In 2004, Roberts joined his father's Proton MotoGP team, but this was uncompetitive, scoring just one point all year. In 2006, he rode in selected Superbike World Championship rounds for the Pedercini Ducati team.

After attempting to set up an AMA team with former champion Doug Chandler, Roberts resumed his links with his father's MotoGP team for 2007, taking over from his brother when Kenny Roberts, Jr. decided the bike was not competitive enough. He took minor points in three successive rounds.

== Career statistics ==
=== Grand Prix motorcycle racing ===
==== By season ====
Season	Class	Motorcycle	Team	Number	Race	Win	Podium	Pole	FLap	Pts	Plcd
1997	250cc	Aprilia, Honda			11	0	0	0	0	0	NC
2001	500cc	Proton KR	Proton Team KR	80	1	0	0	0	0	0	NC
2004	MotoGP	Proton KR	Proton Team KR	80	8	0	0	0	0	1	29th
2005	MotoGP	Proton KR	Team Roberts	80	1	0	0	0	0	0	NC
2007	MotoGP	KR212V	Team Roberts	80	13	0	0	0	0	10	19th
Total					**34**	**0**	**0**	**0**	**0**	**11**	

==== Races by year ====
(key) (Races in bold indicate pole position; races in italics indicate fastest lap)

Year	Class	Bike	1	2	3	4	5	6	7	8	9	10	11	12	13	14	15	16	17	18	Pos	Pts
1997	250cc	Aprilia	MAL; Ret	JPN; Ret	SPA; Ret	ITA; Ret	AUT; 18	FRA	NED	IMO											NC	0
1997	250cc	Honda									GER; 22	BRA; 18	GBR; 18	CZE; 18	CAT; 19	INA; Ret	AUS				NC	0
2001	500cc	Proton KR	JPN	RSA	SPA	FRA	ITA	CAT	NED	GBR	GER	CZE	POR	VAL	PAC	AUS	MAL; Ret	BRA			NC	0
2004	MotoGP	Proton KR	RSA; WD	SPA; Ret	FRA; 15	ITA; Ret	CAT; Ret	NED; Ret	BRA; 19	GER; Ret	GBR; Ret	CZE; DNS	POR	JPN	QAT	MAL	AUS	VAL; DNS			29th	1
2005	MotoGP	Proton KR	SPA	POR	CHN	FRA	ITA	CAT	NED	USA	GBR	GER	CZE	JPN	MAL	QAT	AUS	TUR	VAL; Ret		NC	0
2007	MotoGP	KR212V	QAT	SPA	TUR	CHN	FRA	ITA; Ret	CAT; 18	GBR; 13	NED; 15	GER; 12	USA; Ret	CZE; 15	RSM; 15	POR; Ret	JPN; Ret	AUS; 17	MAL; 20	VAL; Ret	19th	10

=== AMA Superbike Championship ===
Year	Class	Team	1		2		3		4		5		6		7	8		9		10		Pos	Pts
Year	Class	Team	R1	R2	R1	R2	R1	R2	R1	R2	R1	R2	R1	R2	R1	R1	R2	R1	R2	R1	R2	Pos	Pts
2005	SuperBike	Honda	DAY; 9		BAR; Ret	BAR; Ret	FON; 12	FON; Ret	INF; 12	INF; Ret	PPK; 27		RAM; 20	RAM; 7	LAG; 7	M-O; 7	M-O; 5	VIR; Ret	VIR; 30	RAT; 8	RAT; Ret	16th	197
2010	SuperBike	Yamaha	DAY	DAY	FON	FON	RAT	RAT	INF; DNQ	INF; DNQ	RAM	RAM	MOH; Ret	MOH; 10	LAG	VIR	VIR	NJE	NJE	BAR	BAR	37th	11

=== AMA Formula Xtreme Championship ===
==== By year ====
Year	Class	Bike	1	2	3	4	5	6	7	8	9	10	11	Pos	Pts
2005	Formula Xtreme	Honda	DAY; 2	BAR	FON	INF	PPK	RAM	LAG	M-O; 3	VIR	RAT		21st	61
2006	Formula Xtreme	Suzuki	DAY	BAR; 3	FON; 10	INF	RAM	MIL	LAG	OHI	VIR	RAT	OHI	25th	50
