= 1997 French motorcycle Grand Prix =

(France) 1997 French Grand Prix
Race details
- Race 6 of 15 races in the 1997 Grand Prix motorcycle racing season
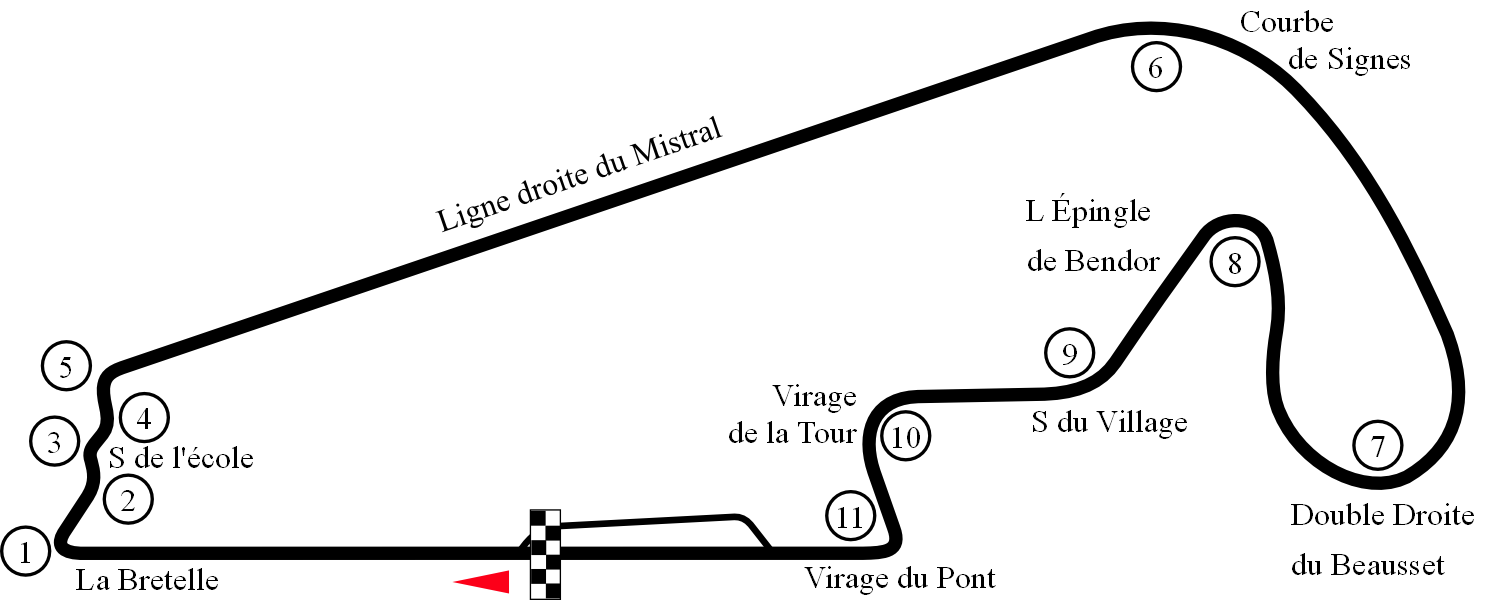
- Date: 8 June 1997
- Official name: Grand Prix de France Moto
- Location: Circuit Paul Ricard
- Course: Permanent racing facility; 3.800 km (2.361 mi)

500cc
Pole position
- Rider: (Australia) Mick Doohan
- Time: 1:21.082
Fastest lap
- Rider: (Australia) Mick Doohan
- Time: 1:21.674
Podium
- First: (Australia) Mick Doohan
- Second: (Spain) Carlos Checa
- Third: (Japan) Tadayuki Okada

250cc
Pole position
- Rider: (France) Olivier Jacque
- Time: 1:23.059
Fastest lap
- Rider: (Italy) Loris Capirossi
- Time: 1:23.559
Podium
- First: (Japan) Tetsuya Harada
- Second: (Italy) Max Biaggi
- Third: (Germany) Ralf Waldmann

125cc
Pole position
- Rider: (Australia) Garry McCoy
- Time: 1:28.774
Fastest lap
- Rider: (Japan) Tomomi Manako
- Time: 1:28.383
Podium
- First: (Italy) Valentino Rossi
- Second: (Japan) Tomomi Manako
- Third: (Australia) Garry McCoy

The 1997 French motorcycle Grand Prix was the sixth round of the 1997 Grand Prix motorcycle racing season. It took place on 8 June 1997 at Circuit Paul Ricard.

== 500 cc classification ==
Pos.	Rider	Team	Manufacturer	Time/Retired	Points
1	(Australia) Mick Doohan	Repsol YPF Honda Team	Honda	42:38.064	25
2	(Spain) Carlos Checa	Movistar Honda Pons	Honda	+4.292	20
3	(Japan) Tadayuki Okada	Repsol YPF Honda Team	Honda	+5.715	16
4	(Spain) Àlex Crivillé	Repsol YPF Honda Team'	Honda	+6.159	13
5	(Japan) Takuma Aoki	Repsol Honda	Honda	+24.227	11
6	(Brazil) Alex Barros	Honda Gresini	Honda	+41.437	10
7	(Japan) Norifumi Abe	Yamaha Team Rainey	Yamaha	+41.734	9
8	(Spain) Alberto Puig	Movistar Honda Pons	Honda	+44.834	8
9	(Spain) Juan Borja	Elf 500 ROC	Elf 500	+51.921	7
10	(Australia) Anthony Gobert	Lucky Strike Suzuki	Suzuki	+52.601	6
11	(Italy) Doriano Romboni	IP Aprilia Racing Team	Aprilia	+53.860	5
12	(Australia) Daryl Beattie	Lucky Strike Suzuki	Suzuki	+56.191	4
13	(Spain) Sete Gibernau	Yamaha Team Rainey	Yamaha	+1:01.044	3
14	(Australia) Troy Corser	Red Bull Yamaha WCM	Yamaha	+1:04.573	2
15	(Netherlands) Jurgen van den Goorbergh	Team Millar MQP	Honda	+1:17.668	1
16	(Germany) Jürgen Fuchs	Elf 500 ROC	Elf 500	+1:20.972	
17	(France) Bernard Garcia	Team Tecmas	Honda	+1:23.191	
18	(France) Frederic Protat	Soverex FP Racing	Honda	+1 Lap	
19	(Italy) Lucio Pedercini	Team Pedercini	ROC Yamaha	+1 Lap	
Ret	(Japan) Nobuatsu Aoki	Rheos Elf FCC TS	Honda	Retirement	
Ret	(Australia) Kirk McCarthy	World Championship Motorsports	ROC Yamaha	Retirement	
Ret	(Italy) Luca Cadalora	Red Bull Yamaha WCM	Yamaha	Retirement	
Ret	(France) Jean-Michel Bayle	Marlboro Team Roberts	Modenas KR3	Retirement	
Ret	(Belgium) Laurent Naveau	Millet Racing	ROC Yamaha	Retirement	
Ret	(United States) Kenny Roberts Jr.	Marlboro Team Roberts	Modenas KR3	Retirement	

== 250 cc classification ==
Pos	Rider	Manufacturer	Time/Retired	Points
1	(Japan) Tetsuya Harada	Aprilia	40:58.961	25
2	(Italy) Max Biaggi	Honda	+0.043	20
3	(Germany) Ralf Waldmann	Honda	+0.224	16
4	(Italy) Loris Capirossi	Aprilia	+8.387	13
5	(Japan) Tohru Ukawa	Honda	+29.702	11
6	(Japan) Haruchika Aoki	Honda	+46.755	10
7	(Argentina) Sebastian Porto	Aprilia	+53.322	9
8	(Spain) Luis d'Antin	Yamaha	+56.677	8
9	(France) William Costes	Honda	+58.027	7
10	(Japan) Osamu Miyazaki	Yamaha	+58.257	6
11	(United Kingdom) Jeremy McWilliams	Honda	+58.414	5
12	(Italy) Franco Battaini	Aprilia	+59.619	4
13	(France) Sebastien Gimbert	Honda	+1:04.540	3
14	(Spain) Idalio Gavira	Aprilia	+1 Lap	2
15	(Switzerland) Claudio Vanzetta	Aprilia	+1 Lap	1
16	(France) Frederic Boutin	Aprilia	+1 Lap	
Ret	(Japan) Noriyasu Numata	Suzuki	Retirement	
Ret	(France) Olivier Jacque	Honda	Retirement	
Ret	(France) Franck Poulle	Honda	Retirement	
Ret	(France) Bertrand Stey	Honda	Retirement	
Ret	(Italy) Cristiano Migliorati	Honda	Retirement	
Ret	(Japan) Takeshi Tsujimura	TSR-Honda	Retirement	
Ret	(Spain) José Luis Cardoso	Yamaha	Retirement	
Ret	(Italy) Stefano Perugini	Aprilia	Retirement	

== 125 cc classification ==
Pos	Rider	Manufacturer	Time/Retired	Points
1	(Italy) Valentino Rossi	Aprilia	40:20.214	25
2	(Japan) Tomomi Manako	Honda	+2.961	20
3	(Australia) Garry McCoy	Aprilia	+12.462	16
4	(Japan) Youichi Ui	Yamaha	+17.681	13
5	(France) Frederic Petit	Honda	+30.402	11
6	(Japan) Yoshiaki Katoh	Yamaha	+38.164	10
7	(Italy) Mirko Giansanti	Honda	+44.116	9
8	(Italy) Gianluigi Scalvini	Honda	+44.549	8
9	(Japan) Masao Azuma	Honda	+44.745	7
10	(Germany) Dirk Raudies	Honda	+49.734	6
11	(Spain) Enrique Maturana	Yamaha	+51.151	5
12	(Italy) Gino Borsoi	Yamaha	+1:02.148	4
13	(Germany) Steve Jenkner	Aprilia	+1:05.228	3
14	(Spain) Josep Sarda	Honda	+1:05.473	2
15	(Spain) Angel Nieto Jr	Aprilia	+1:05.955	1
16	(Italy) Ivan Goi	Aprilia	+1:29.111	
17	(France) Nicolas Dussauge	Honda	+1 Lap	
18	(Austria) Benny Jerzenbeck	Honda	+1 Lap	
19	(France) Vincent Philippe	Honda	+1 Lap	
20	(France) Patrick Detot	Honda	+1 Lap	
21	(France) Fabien Rousseau	Aprilia	+1 Lap	
Ret	(Italy) Roberto Locatelli	Honda	Retirement	
Ret	(France) Mike Lougassi	Honda	Retirement	
Ret	(France) Eric Mizera	Honda	Retirement	
Ret	(Japan) Noboru Ueda	Honda	Retirement	
Ret	(Czech Republic) Jaroslav Hules	Honda	Retirement	
Ret	(Italy) Lucio Cecchinello	Honda	Retirement	
Ret	(Germany) Manfred Geissler	Aprilia	Retirement	
Ret	(Japan) Kazuto Sakata	Aprilia	Retirement	

Previous race: 1997 Austrian Grand Prix	FIM Grand Prix World Championship; 1997 season	Next race: 1997 Dutch TT
Previous race: 1996 French Grand Prix	French Grand Prix	Next race: 1998 French Grand Prix
