= 1997 Grand Prix motorcycle racing season =

Sports season

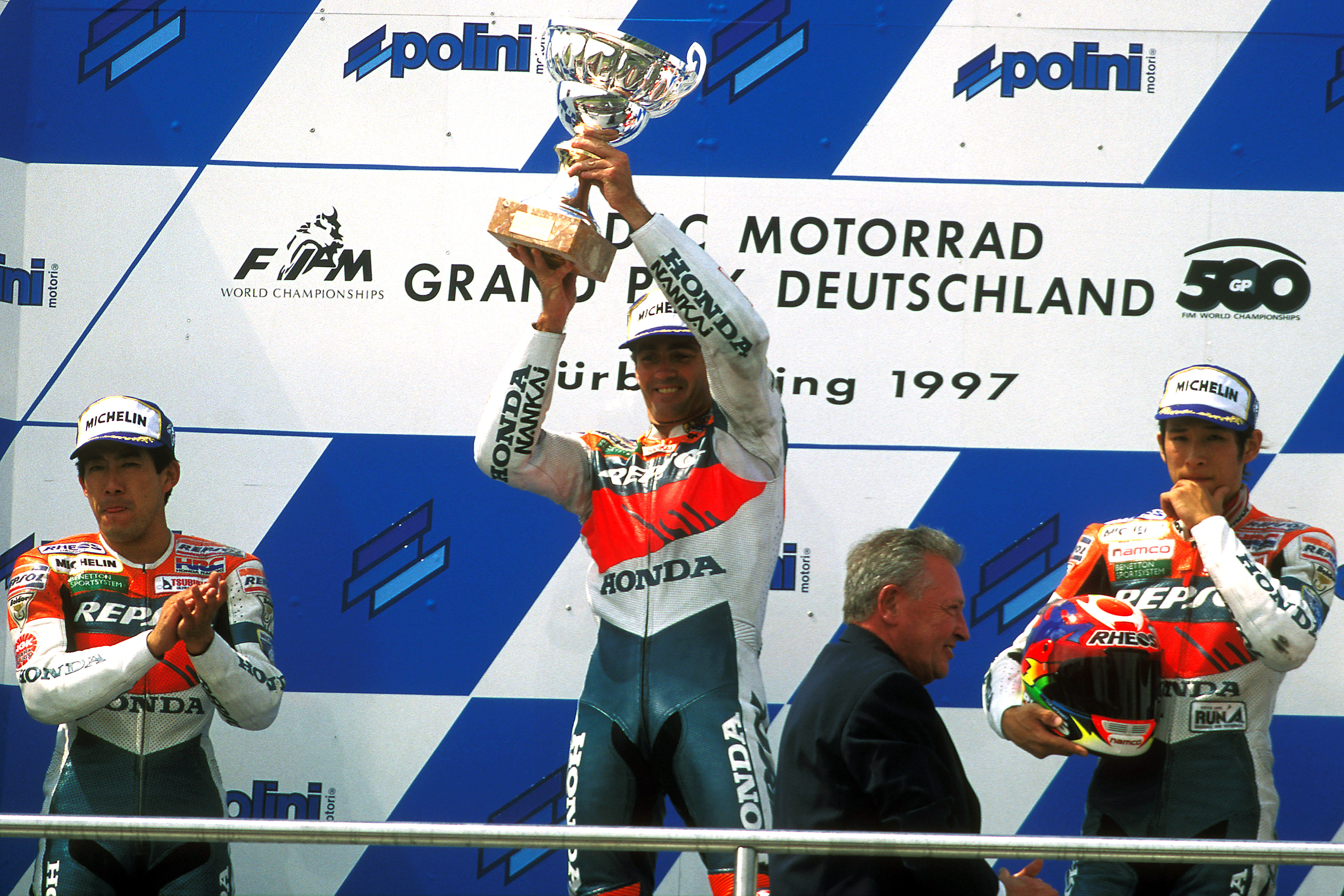
Mick Doohan (pictured at the Nürburgring) became the 1997 500cc world champion

The 1997 Grand Prix motorcycle racing season was the 49th F.I.M. Road Racing World Championship season.

== Season summary ==
A fourth world championship in a row for Honda's Mick Doohan with another dominating performance. He broke Giacomo Agostini's record set in 1972 for the most victories in one season with 12 wins. It was also dominating year for Honda with eight of the top ten riders aboard Hondas. The Yamaha and Suzuki teams were in disarray. Kenny Roberts left Yamaha to start his own venture with a lightweight, three-cylinder Modenas. Wayne Rainey's team was left with the inconsistent Norifumi Abe and Sete Gibernau, a rookie. Daryl Beattie wasn't able to come back from head injuries and retired at the end of the year while Anthony Gobert failed a drug test and was dismissed by the Suzuki team. The Elf team soldiered on with their Swiss-Auto V4 but Aprilia decided to pull their V twin from the 500 class at the end of the year.

Max Biaggi had a harder time defending his title from Tetsuya Harada and Ralf Waldmann, not clinching the title until the last race of the year. A new star emerged from the 125 class with Valentino Rossi winning 11 races for a commanding win on an Aprilia.

As of 2025 it was the last season that only one manufacturer won every race in one season in the premier class to date.

== 1997 Grand Prix season calendar ==
The following Grands Prix were scheduled to take place in 1997:

Round	Date	Grand Prix	Circuit
1	13 April	(Malaysia) Marlboro Malaysian Grand Prix	Shah Alam Circuit
2	20 April	Marlboro Grand Prix of Japan	Suzuka Circuit
3	4 May	(Spain) Gran Premio Lucky Strike de España	Circuito Permanente de Jerez
4	18 May	(Italy) Gran Premio d'Italia Polini	Mugello Circuit
5	1 June	(Austria) Motorrad Grand Prix von Österreich	A1-Ring
6	8 June	Grand Prix de France	Circuit Paul Ricard
7	28 June ††	(Netherlands) Lucky Strike Dutch Grand Prix	TT Circuit Assen
8	6 July	(Bologna) Gran Premio Cirio Città di Imola	Autodromo Enzo e Dino Ferrari
9	20 July	(Germany) ADAC Motorrad Grand Prix Deutschland	Nürburgring
10	3 August	(Rio de Janeiro (state)) Lucky Strike Rio Grand Prix	Autódromo Internacional Nelson Piquet
11	17 August	(United Kingdom) Sun British Grand Prix	Donington Park
12	31 August	(Czech Republic) Grand Prix České republiky	Brno Circuit
13	14 September	(Catalonia) Gran Premi Marlboro de Catalunya	Circuit de Catalunya
14	28 September	(Indonesia) Marlboro Indonesian Grand Prix	Sentul International Circuit
15	5 October	(Australia) Australian Motorcycle Grand Prix	Phillip Island

†† = Saturday race

=== Calendar changes ===
- The Malaysian Grand Prix replaced the Japanese Grand Prix with hosting the opening round Grand Prix.
- The Indonesian Grand Prix was moved back from 7 April to 28 September.
- The Austrian Grand Prix was moved forward from 4 August to 1 June.
- The Australian Grand Prix moved from the Eastern Creek Raceway to the Phillip Island Grand Prix Circuit.

== 1997 Grand Prix season results ==
Round	Date	Grand Prix	Circuit	125cc winner	250cc winner	500cc winner	Report
1	13 April	(Malaysia) Malaysian motorcycle Grand Prix	Shah Alam	(Italy) Valentino Rossi	(Italy) Max Biaggi	(Australia) Mick Doohan	Report
2	20 April	(Japan) Japanese motorcycle Grand Prix	Suzuka	(Japan) Noboru Ueda	(Japan) Daijiro Kato	(Australia) Mick Doohan	Report
3	4 May	(Spain) Spanish motorcycle Grand Prix	Jerez	(Italy) Valentino Rossi	(Germany) Ralf Waldmann	(Spain) Àlex Crivillé	Report
4	18 May	(Italy) Italian motorcycle Grand Prix	Mugello	(Italy) Valentino Rossi	(Italy) Max Biaggi	(Australia) Mick Doohan	Report
5	1 June	(Austria) Austrian motorcycle Grand Prix	A1-Ring	(Japan) Noboru Ueda	(France) Olivier Jacque	(Australia) Mick Doohan	Report
6	8 June	(France) French motorcycle Grand Prix	Paul Ricard	(Italy) Valentino Rossi	(Japan) Tetsuya Harada	(Australia) Mick Doohan	Report
7	28 June ††	(Netherlands) Dutch TT	Assen	(Italy) Valentino Rossi	(Japan) Tetsuya Harada	(Australia) Mick Doohan	Report
8	6 July	(Bologna) City of Imola motorcycle Grand Prix	Imola	(Italy) Valentino Rossi	(Italy) Max Biaggi	(Australia) Mick Doohan	Report
9	20 July	(Germany) German motorcycle Grand Prix	Nürburgring	(Italy) Valentino Rossi	(Japan) Tetsuya Harada	(Australia) Mick Doohan	Report
10	3 August	(Rio de Janeiro (state)) Rio de Janeiro motorcycle Grand Prix	Rio de Janeiro	(Italy) Valentino Rossi	(France) Olivier Jacque	(Australia) Mick Doohan	Report
11	17 August	(United Kingdom) British motorcycle Grand Prix	Donington	(Italy) Valentino Rossi	(Germany) Ralf Waldmann	(Australia) Mick Doohan	Report
12	31 August	Czech Republic motorcycle Grand Prix	Brno	(Japan) Noboru Ueda	(Italy) Max Biaggi	(Australia) Mick Doohan	Report
13	14 September	(Catalonia) Catalan motorcycle Grand Prix	Catalunya	(Italy) Valentino Rossi	(Germany) Ralf Waldmann	(Australia) Mick Doohan	Report
14	28 September	(Indonesia) Indonesian motorcycle Grand Prix	Sentul	(Italy) Valentino Rossi	(Italy) Max Biaggi	(Japan) Tadayuki Okada	Report
15	5 October	(Australia) Australian motorcycle Grand Prix	Phillip Island	(Japan) Noboru Ueda	(Germany) Ralf Waldmann	(Spain) Àlex Crivillé	Report

†† = Saturday race

== Participants ==
=== 500 cc participants ===
Team	Constructor	Motorcycle	No	Rider	Rounds
(Japan) Repsol YPF Honda Team	Honda	Honda NSR500 (NV0X)	1	(Australia) Mick Doohan	All
(Japan) Repsol YPF Honda Team	Honda	Honda NSR500 (NV0X)	2	(Spain) Àlex Crivillé	1–7, 12–15
(Japan) Repsol YPF Honda Team	Honda	Honda NSR500 (NV0X)	7	(Japan) Tadayuki Okada	All
(Japan) Repsol YPF Honda Team	Honda	Honda NSR500V (NVAB)	24	(Japan) Takuma Aoki	All
(Italy) Yamaha Promotor Racing	Yamaha	Yamaha YZR500 (OWH0)	3	(Italy) Luca Cadalora	1–3
(Italy) Yamaha Promotor Racing	Yamaha	Yamaha YZR500 (OWH0)	11	(Australia) Troy Corser	1–3
(United Kingdom) Red Bull Yamaha WCM	Yamaha	Yamaha YZR500 (OWH0)	3	(Italy) Luca Cadalora	4–15
(United Kingdom) Red Bull Yamaha WCM	Yamaha	Yamaha YZR500 (OWH0)	11	(Australia) Troy Corser	4–7
(United Kingdom) Red Bull Yamaha WCM	Yamaha	Yamaha YZR500 (OWH0)	22	(Australia) Kirk McCarthy	11–15
(United Kingdom) Red Bull Yamaha WCM	ROC Yamaha	ROC Yamaha GP1	22	(Australia) Kirk McCarthy	9–10
(Italy) Honda Gresini	Honda	Honda NSR500V	4	(Brazil) Alex Barros	All
(Japan) / (United States) Yamaha Team Rainey	Yamaha	Yamaha YZR500 (OWH0)	5	(Japan) Norick Abe	All
(Japan) / (United States) Yamaha Team Rainey	Yamaha	Yamaha YZR500 (OWH0)	20	(Spain) Sete Gibernau	All
(Japan) Lucky Strike Suzuki	Suzuki	Suzuki RGV500 (XR87)	6	(Australia) Daryl Beattie	All
(Japan) Lucky Strike Suzuki	Suzuki	Suzuki RGV500 (XR87)	23	(Australia) Anthony Gobert	1, 4–12
(Japan) Lucky Strike Suzuki	Suzuki	Suzuki RGV500 (XR87)	26	(Japan) Yukio Kagayama	15
(Japan) Lucky Strike Suzuki	Suzuki	Suzuki RGV500 (XR87)	27	(Australia) Peter Goddard	2–3
(Japan) Lucky Strike Suzuki	Suzuki	Suzuki RGV500 (XR87)	27	(Australia) Peter Goddard	14–15
(Spain) MoviStar Honda Pons	Honda	Honda NSR500	8	(Spain) Carlos Checa	All
(Spain) MoviStar Honda Pons	Honda	Honda NSR500	9	(Spain) Alberto Puig	All
(Malaysia) / (United States) Marlboro Team Roberts	Modenas KR	Modenas KR3	10	(United States) Kenny Roberts Jr.	All
(Malaysia) / (United States) Marlboro Team Roberts	Modenas KR	Modenas KR3	12	(France) Jean-Michel Bayle	All
(France) Tecmas Honda Elf	Honda	Honda NSR500V	13	(France) Bernard Garcia	6–9
(France) Tecmas Honda Elf	Honda	Honda NSR500V	55	(France) Regis Laconi	1–5, 10–15
(France) ELF 500 ROC	Elf	Elf 500	14	(Spain) Juan Borja	All
(France) ELF 500 ROC	Elf	Elf 500	16	(Germany) Jürgen Fuchs	All
(France) Soverex FP Racing	ROC Yamaha	ROC Yamaha GP1	15	(France) Frédéric Protat	1–3
(France) Soverex FP Racing	Honda	Honda NSR500V	15	(France) Frédéric Protat	4–15
(Italy) Team Pedercini	ROC Yamaha	ROC Yamaha GP1	17	(Italy) Lucio Pedercini	All
(Japan) Rheos ELF F.C.C. T.S.R	Honda	Honda NSR500	18	(Japan) Nobuatsu Aoki	All
(Italy) IP Aprilia Racing Team	Aprilia	Aprilia RSW-2 500	19	(Italy) Doriano Romboni	3–15
(Italy) IP Aprilia Racing Team	Aprilia	Aprilia RSW-2 500	39	(Italy) Alessandro Gramigni	1–2
(United Kingdom) Team Millar MQP	Honda	Honda NSR500V	21	(Netherlands) Jurgen van den Goorbergh	All
(United Kingdom) World Champ Motorsports	ROC Yamaha	ROC Yamaha	22	(Australia) Kirk McCarthy	1–8
(France) Millet Racing	ROC Yamaha	ROC Yamaha GP1	25	(Belgium) Laurent Naveau	All
(Japan) Marlboro Yamaha	Yamaha	Yamaha YZR500	51	(Japan) Norihiko Fujiwara	2
(Italy) Team Paton	Paton	Paton V70 C10/3	53	(Italy) Francesco Monaco	4, 8
(United Kingdom) Padgett's	Honda	Honda NSR500V	98	(United Kingdom) Jason Vincent	11

Key
Regular rider
Wildcard rider
Replacement rider

=== 250cc participants ===
Team	Constructor	Motorcycle	No	Rider	Rounds
(Japan) Marlboro Team Kanemoto Honda	Honda	Honda NSR250	1	(Italy) Max Biaggi	All
(Japan) Marlboro Honda	Honda	Honda NSR250	2	(Germany) Ralf Waldmann	All
(Italy) Benetton Honda	Honda	Honda NSR250	5	(Japan) Tohru Ukawa	All
(Spain) Antena 3 S.S.P. Competicion	Yamaha	Yamaha YZR 250	6	(Spain) Luis D'Antin	1–11, 13–15
(Spain) Antena 3 S.S.P. Competicion	Yamaha	Yamaha YZR 250	17	(Spain) José Luis Cardoso	All
(Spain) Antena 3 S.S.P. Competicion	Yamaha	Yamaha YZR 250	49	(Spain) Oscar Sainz	12
(Italy) Matteoni Racing	Honda	Honda NSR250	7	(Japan) Haruchika Aoki	All
(Italy) Team Axo Inoxmacel	Honda	Honda NSR250	8	(Italy) Cristiano Migliorati	All
(Netherlands) Dee Cee Racing Team	Honda	Honda NSR250	10	(Italy) Luca Boscoscuro	All
(United Kingdom) QUB Team Optimum	Honda	Honda NSR250	11	(United Kingdom) Jeremy McWilliams	All
(Japan) F.C.C. Technical Sports	T.S. Honda	Honda NSR250	12	(Japan) Takeshi Tsujimura	All
(Netherlands) Molenaar Lucky Strike Suzuki	Suzuki	Suzuki RGV250	14	(United Kingdom) Jamie Robinson	1–9, 11–15
(Netherlands) Molenaar Lucky Strike Suzuki	Suzuki	Suzuki RGV250	20	(Japan) Noriyasu Numata	1–14
(Netherlands) Molenaar Lucky Strike Suzuki	Suzuki	Suzuki RGV250	23	(Sweden) Johan Stigefelt	10
(Netherlands) Molenaar Lucky Strike Suzuki	Suzuki	Suzuki RGV250	30	(Australia) Troy Bayliss	15
(Italy) Nastro Azzurro Aprilia	Aprilia	Aprilia RSV 250	15	(Italy) Stefano Perugini	All
(France) Chesterfield Elf Tech 3	Honda	Honda NSR250	16	(France) William Costes	All
(France) Chesterfield Elf Tech 3	Honda	Honda NSR250	19	(France) Olivier Jacque	All
(Germany) Edo Racing	Yamaha	Yamaha YZR 250	18	(Japan) Osamu Miyazaki	All
(Germany) Edo Racing	Yamaha	Yamaha YZR 250	21	(Italy) Franco Battaini	1–9, 11–15
(United States) Team PJ1 Oils	Aprilia	Aprilia RSV 250	22	(United States) Kurtis Roberts	1–6, 10
(United States) Team PJ1 Oils	Honda	Honda NSR250	22	(United States) Kurtis Roberts	9, 11–15
(Switzerland) Mohag Aprilia Racing Team	Aprilia	Aprilia RSV 250	24	(Switzerland) Claudio Vanzetta	6
(Switzerland) Mohag Aprilia Racing Team	Aprilia	Aprilia RSV 250	24	(Switzerland) Claudio Vanzetta	12
(Switzerland) Mohag Aprilia Racing Team	Aprilia	Aprilia RSV 250	25	(Switzerland) Oliver Petrucciani	1–5, 7–15
(Spain) Fortuna Honda	Honda	Honda NSR250	26	(Spain) Emilio Alzamora	1–5, 7–15
(Spain) PR2 YPF–ESCO	Aprilia	Aprilia RSV 250	27	(Argentina) Sebastián Porto	All
(Spain) Scuderia Mobil 1 AGV	Aprilia	Aprilia RSV 250	28	(Spain) Eustaquio Gavira	All
(Spain) Scuderia Mobil 1 AGV	Aprilia	Aprilia RSV 250	29	(Spain) Idalio Gavira	1–12
(Italy) Aprilia Racing Team	Aprilia	Aprilia RSV 250	31	(Japan) Tetsuya Harada	All
(Italy) Aprilia Racing Team	Aprilia	Aprilia RSV 250	34	(Italy) Marcellino Lucchi	4
(Italy) Aprilia Racing Team	Aprilia	Aprilia RSV 250	65	(Italy) Loris Capirossi	All
(Japan) Marlboro Yamaha	Yamaha	Yamaha YZR 250	33	(Japan) Kensuke Haga	2
(Italy) Radiant Racing Team	Aprilia	Aprilia RSV 250	34	(Italy) Marcellino Lucchi	5
(Italy) Radiant Racing Team	Aprilia	Aprilia RSV 250	34	(Italy) Marcellino Lucchi	8
(Italy) Radiant Racing Team	Aprilia	Aprilia RSV 250	99	(Italy) Giuseppe Fiorillo	3–4, 7–15
(Japan) Castrol Honda	Honda	Honda NSR250	35	(Japan) Daijiro Kato	2
(Japan) Compile Racing Yamaha	Yamaha	Yamaha YZR 250	36	(Japan) Naoki Matsudo	2
(Japan) Jaja Racing Team	Suzuki	Suzuki RGV250	37	(Japan) Choujun Kameya	2
(Japan) Jaja Racing Team	Suzuki	Suzuki RGV250	38	(Japan) Yukio Kagayama	2
(Japan) Ikko Racing Team	Yamaha	Yamaha YZR 250	39	(Japan) Naoto Ogura	2
(Czech Republic) Wernberger Racing Team	Aprilia	Aprilia RSV 250	40	(Czech Republic) Bohumil Staša Jr.	12
Matador Slovakia	Honda	Honda NSR250	41	(Slovakia) Vladimír Částka	12
(Czech Republic) Racing Team Znojmo	Yamaha	Yamaha YZR 250	42	(Czech Republic) Radomil Rous	12
(Spain) Nuevo Racing Team M3	Aprilia	Aprilia RSV 250	43	(Spain) Manuel Luque	13
(Spain) T.M.R.	Honda	Honda NSR250	44	(Spain) David Guardiola	13
(Spain) SBK Sport	Honda	Honda NSR250	47	(Spain) Javier Marsellá	3, 13
(Spain) SBK Sport	Honda	Honda NSR250	51	(Spain) Jesus Perez	3, 13
(Spain) Team Sontano	Yamaha	Yamaha YZR 250	48	(Spain) José David de Gea	3, 13
(Spain) Amadori Racing Group	Aprilia	Aprilia RSV 250	49	(Spain) Oscar Sainz	3–4
(Spain) Equipe Escuela Morante	Honda	Honda NSR250	50	(Spain) Ismael Bonilla	3, 13
(Spain) Promoto Sport	Aprilia	Aprilia RSV 250	52	(Spain) José Martin	3
(Italy) Ducci Organization Racing Team	Aprilia	Aprilia RSV 250	53	(Italy) Davide Bulega	4, 8
(Italy) Desenzano Corse	Aprilia	Aprilia RSV 250	54	(Italy) Fabio Carpani	4
(Italy) Team Italia	Aprilia	Aprilia RSV 250	55	(Italy) Walter Tortoroglio	4
(Australia) West Coast Motorsports	Honda	Honda NSR250	56	(Australia) Simon Weeks	15
(Australia) West Coast Motorsports	Honda	Honda NSR250	58	(Australia) William Strugnell	15
(Austria) Stadler Racing	Honda	Honda NSR250	59	(Austria) Thomas Stadler	5
(Austria) Remus Racing	Honda	Honda NSR250	60	(Austria) Uwe Bolterhauer	5
(Austria) Team Zwidl	Aprilia	Aprilia RSV 250	61	(Austria) Robert Zwidl	5
(Austria) MRSC Horsching	Yamaha	Yamaha YZR 250	63	(Austria) Jurgen Haim	5
(Austria) MRV Kirkd. - Micheld.	Aprilia	Aprilia RSV 250	64	(Austria) Mario Zehetner	5
Equipe de France	Honda	Honda NSR250	66	(France) Sébastien Gimbert	6
(France) F.P. Cannes	Honda	Honda NSR250	67	(France) Franck Poulle	6
(France) Team Stey Motos	Honda	Honda NSR250	68	(France) Bertrand Stey	6
(France) AJP	Honda	Honda NSR250	69	(France) Tony Falcone	6
(France) AJP	Honda	Honda NSR250	71	(France) Gilles Ferstler	6
(France) Boutin Racing Team	Aprilia	Aprilia RSV 250	70	(France) Frederic Boutin	6
(Netherlands) MRTT Team Bolwerk	Honda	Honda NSR250	73	(Netherlands) Maurice Bolwerk	7, 12
(Netherlands) Johan Jong Racing Team	Honda	Honda NSR250	74	(Netherlands) Gerard Rike	7
(Netherlands) Racing Team Twello	Honda	Honda NSR250	75	(Netherlands) Andre Romein	7
(Netherlands) Team Schoenkaper Oz Racing	Honda	Honda NSR250	76	(Netherlands) Henk Van De Lagemaat	7
(Netherlands) Team JHR	Yamaha	Yamaha YZR 250	77	(Netherlands) Jaap Hoogeveen	7
(Netherlands) Schotsman Schroot Racing	Honda	Honda NSR250	78	(Netherlands) Gert Pieper	7
(Italy) Oscavalli Racing Team	Honda	Honda NSR250	80	(Italy) Sandro Di Stefano	8
(New Zealand) Ride Tall Racing	Yamaha	Yamaha YZR 250	82	(New Zealand) Michael Tall	15
(New Zealand) Cempac Woodchipping	Yamaha	Yamaha YZR 250	83	(New Zealand) Michael Clunie	15
(Australia) VTI Racing Amsoil	Yamaha	Yamaha YZR 250	84	(Australia) Ben Reid	15
(Germany) KM Racing Team	Honda	Honda NSR250	85	(Germany) Stefan Kruse	9
(Germany) Team Witschi	Honda	Honda NSR250	86	(Germany) Jurgen Lingg	9
(Germany) Team Yamaha Kurz	Yamaha	Yamaha YZR 250	87	(Germany) Matthias Neukirchner	9
(United Kingdom) Scott Smart Racing	Honda	Honda NSR250	88	(United Kingdom) Scott Smart	11
(Venezuela) Adelante Gojedes	Yamaha	Yamaha YZR 250	92	(Venezuela) Francesco Pellegrino	10
(Argentina) Gregorio IMSA Castrol VHT	Honda	Honda NSR250	93	(Argentina) Federico Gartner	10
(United Kingdom) Paul Bird Motorsport Aprilia	Aprilia	Aprilia RSV 250	94	(United Kingdom) John McGuinness	11
(United Kingdom) Padgetts	Honda	Honda NSR250	95	(United Kingdom) Gary May	11
(United Kingdom) Honda Britain Dickson	Honda	Honda NSR250	96	(United Kingdom) Steve Sawford	11
(United Kingdom) Honda Britain Dickson	Honda	Honda NSR250	97	(United Kingdom) Callum Ramsay	11

Key
Regular rider
Wildcard rider
Replacement rider

=== 125cc participants ===
Team	Constructor	Motorcycle	No	Rider	Rounds
(Netherlands) Docshop Racing	Honda	Honda RS125R	2	(Japan) Masaki Tokudome	All
(Netherlands) Docshop Racing	Honda	Honda RS125R	91	(Germany) Maik Stief	9
(Germany) Team UGT 3000	Honda	Honda RS125R	3	(Japan) Tomomi Manako	All
(Germany) Team UGT 3000	Honda	Honda RS125R	33	(Germany) Manfred Geissler	1–5, 8
(Germany) Team UGT 3000	Aprilia	Aprilia RS125R	33	(Germany) Manfred Geissler	6–7, 9
(Germany) Team UGT 3000	Honda	Honda RS125R	42	(Malaysia) Shahrol Yuzy	14–15
(Germany) Team UGT 3000	Honda	Honda RS125R	77	(Germany) Benny Jerzenbeck	10
(Germany) Team UGT 3000	Honda	Honda RS125R	98	(United Kingdom) Chris Burns	11–13
(Spain) Team Airtel-Aspar	Aprilia	Aprilia RS125R	5	(Spain) Jorge Martínez	All
(Spain) Team Airtel-Aspar	Aprilia	Aprilia RS125R	29	(Spain) Ángel Nieto Jr.	All
(Spain) Team Airtel-Aspar	Aprilia	Aprilia RS125R	48	(Spain) Alfonso Gonzalez	3
(Italy) Team Pileri	Honda	Honda RS125R	7	(Japan) Noboru Ueda	All
(Germany) UGT 3000	Aprilia	Aprilia RS125R	8	(Japan) Kazuto Sakata	All
(Germany) UGT 3000	Aprilia	Aprilia RS125R	33	(Germany) Manfred Geissler	10–15
(Germany) UGT 3000	Aprilia	Aprilia RS125R	88	(Germany) Peter Öttl	1–4, 7–8
(Germany) UGT 3000	Aprilia	Aprilia RS125R	77	(Germany) Benny Jerzenbeck	5
(Germany) UGT 3000	Honda	Honda RS125R	77	(Germany) Benny Jerzenbeck	6, 9
(Italy) Spidi Honda LCR	Honda	Honda RS125R	10	(Italy) Lucio Cecchinello	All
(Germany) Finsco Chasis Team	Honda	Honda RS125R	12	(Germany) Dirk Raudies	All
(Germany) Finsco Chasis Team	Honda	Honda RS125R	25	(Spain) Josep Sardá	All
(Italy) Matteoni Racing	Honda	Honda RS125R	13	(Italy) Marco Melandri	12
(Italy) Matteoni Racing	Honda	Honda RS125R	32	(Italy) Mirko Giansanti	All
(Italy) Matteoni Racing	Honda	Honda RS125R	54	(Italy) Marco Borciani	4
(Italy) Team Axo Inoxmacel	Honda	Honda RS125R	15	(Italy) Roberto Locatelli	All
(Italy) Team Axo Inoxmacel	Honda	Honda RS125R	21	(Italy) Gianluigi Scalvini	All
(Germany) Team Yamaha Kurz	Yamaha	Yamaha TZ125	17	(Spain) Juan Enrique Maturana	All
(Germany) Team Yamaha Kurz	Yamaha	Yamaha TZ125	41	(Japan) Youichi Ui	All
(Germany) Team Yamaha Kurz	Yamaha	Yamaha TZ125	63	(Austria) Bernd Holzleitner	5
(France) Team RMS	Honda	Honda RS125R	19	(France) Frédéric Petit	All
(France) Team RMS	Honda	Honda RS125R	66	(France) Eric Mizera	6
(Belgium) L.B. Racing	Honda	Honda RS125R	20	(Japan) Masao Azuma	All
(Belgium) L.B. Racing	Honda	Honda RS125R	39	(Czech Republic) Jaroslav Huleš	All
(Germany) Team Aprilia - ADAC Sachse	Aprilia	Aprilia RS125R	22	(Germany) Steve Jenkner	All
(Italy) Team Semprucci Biesse	Yamaha	Yamaha TZ125	24	(Italy) Gino Borsoi	All
(Italy) Team Semprucci Biesse	Yamaha	Yamaha TZ125	62	(Japan) Yoshiaki Katoh	All
(Italy) Marlboro Team Alfa Bieffe	Aprilia	Aprilia RS125R	26	(Italy) Ivan Goi	1–12
(Italy) Marlboro Team Alfa Bieffe	Aprilia	Aprilia RS125R	43	(Spain) Xavier Soler	13–15
(Italy) Marlboro Team Alfa Bieffe	Aprilia	Aprilia RS125R	72	(Australia) Gary McCoy	All
(United Kingdom) Tom Taylor Team	Honda	Honda RS125R	27	(Hungary) Gábor Talmácsi	12
(United Kingdom) Padgetts	Honda	Honda RS125R	28	(Portugal) Fernando Mendes	11
(United Kingdom) RCD Motorsport	Honda	Honda RS125R	30	(United Kingdom) Darren Barton	11
(Japan) JHA Racing	Honda	Honda RS125R	31	(Japan) Hideyuki Nakajoh	2
(Japan) Team Harc-Pro	Honda	Honda RS125R	34	(Japan) Kazuhiro Takao	2
(Czech Republic) Uamk Motorace Whirlpool	Honda	Honda RS125R	34	(Czech Republic) Michal Březina	12
(Japan) Endurance Racing	Honda	Honda RS125R	35	(Japan) Toshiaki Ozawa	2
(Czech Republic) AMK Ravena	Honda	Honda RS125R	35	(Czech Republic) Igor Kaláb	12
(Japan) J. Racing	Honda	Honda RS125R	36	(Japan) Katsuji Uezu	2
(Japan) Tube R Able Competicion	Honda	Honda RS125R	37	(Japan) Jun Inageda	2
(Japan) M.-Project	Honda	Honda RS125R	38	(Japan) Yuzo Fujioka	2
(United Kingdom) Paul Bird Motorsport	Honda	Honda RS125R	40	(United Kingdom) Steve Patrickson	11
(Malaysia) Petronas Sprinta Team TVK	Honda	Honda RS125R	42	(Malaysia) Shahrol Yuzy	1
(Spain) Team Ortega	Honda	Honda RS125R	42	(Spain) David Ortega	13
(Malaysia) Motosport Promotions	Yamaha	Yamaha TZ125	43	(Malaysia) Chao Chee Hou	1
(Malaysia) Motosport Promotions	Yamaha	Yamaha TZ125	45	(Thailand) Paholayuth Kalachan	1
Team GM Malaysia Boleh	Cagiva	Cagiva	44	(Malaysia) Azman Ali	1
(Spain) T.M.R.	Honda	Honda RS125R	44	(Spain) Joan Montero	13
(Spain) T.M.R.	Honda	Honda RS125R	47	(Spain) David García	3
(Spain) Aprilia - Motorrad PS Racing	Aprilia	Aprilia RS125R	45	(Spain) Iván Martínez	13
(Italy) Nastro Azzurro Aprilia	Aprilia	Aprilia RS125R	46	(Italy) Valentino Rossi	All
(Australia) Taylor Racing	Honda	Honda RS125R	47	(Australia) Jay Taylor	15
(Australia) Southern Cross Sports	Honda	Honda RS125R	48	(Australia) William Strugnell	15
(Spain) Jamoto Galp	Yamaha	Yamaha TZ125	49	(Spain) José Ramon Ramirez	3
(Australia) Wolfendon Racing	Yamaha	Yamaha TZ125	49	(Australia) James Armstrong	15
(Spain) Team Ricardo Tormo	Aprilia	Aprilia RS125R	50	(Spain) Jerónimo Vidal	3
(Australia) Andrew Willy Racing	Yamaha	Yamaha TZ125	50	(Australia) Andrew Willy	15
(Spain) Sevilla 99	Yamaha	Yamaha TZ125	51	(Spain) Vicente Esparragoso	3, 13
(Australia) Teknic Racing	Honda	Honda RS125R	51	(Australia) Peter Galvin	15
(Spain) Centro Comercial Neptuno	Honda	Honda RS125R	52	(Spain) Alvaro Molina	3, 13
(Australia) Bool Racing	Honda	Honda RS125R	52	(Australia) Hayden Bool	15
(Italy) BNT Racing	Honda	Honda RS125R	53	(Italy) Igor Antonelli	4, 8
Yamaha Indonesia Racing	Yamaha	Yamaha TZ125	53	(Indonesia) Rudi Arianto	14
Yamaha Indonesia Racing	Yamaha	Yamaha TZ125	55	(Indonesia) Ahmad Jayadi	14
Yamaha Indonesia Racing	Yamaha	Yamaha TZ125	56	(Indonesia) Irvan Octavianus	14
Yamaha Indonesia Racing	Yamaha	Yamaha TZ125	57	(Indonesia) Nasrul Arif Budiman	14
(Italy) RCGM	Aprilia	Aprilia RS125R	55	(Italy) Federico Cerroni	4
(Italy) G.M.R.	Honda	Honda RS125R	56	(Japan) Marco Masetti	4
(Italy) Team Italia	Aprilia	Aprilia RS125R	57	(Italy) Simone Sanna	4
(Italy) Debbia Racing Team	Honda	Honda RS125R	58	(Italy) Roberto Bellei	4
(Austria) MSC-Traun	Honda	Honda RS125R	59	(Austria) Harald Danninger	5
(Austria) Hofer Racing Team	Honda	Honda RS125R	60	(Austria) Gerwin Hofer	5
(Austria) Power Sports Company	Honda	Honda RS125R	61	(Austria) Georg Scharl	5
(Austria) AGIP Brandstetter	Honda	Honda RS125R	64	(Austria) Wolfgang Brandstetter	5
(Austria) RTR - Racing	Honda	Honda RS125R	65	(Austria) Jochen Reichart	5
(France) Team Patrick Detot	Honda	Honda RS125R	67	(France) Patrick Detot	6
(France) GMS Auto	Honda	Honda RS125R	68	(France) Mike Lougassi	6
(France) Team Premier/Escudier	Aprilia	Aprilia RS125R	69	(France) Fabien Rousseau	6
(France) AVM Racing	Honda	Honda RS125R	70	(France) Vincent Philippe	6
(France) Dom Racing Team	Honda	Honda RS125R	71	(France) Nicolas Dussauge	6
(Netherlands) Filart MRTT Racing	Honda	Honda RS125R	73	(Netherlands) Rob Filart	7
(Netherlands) Dee Cee Racing Team	Honda	Honda RS125R	74	(Netherlands) Jarno Janssen	7
(Netherlands) Racing Team Hans Koopman	Honda	Honda RS125R	75	(Netherlands) Hans Koopman	7
(Netherlands) D.B. Competicion	Honda	Honda RS125R	76	(Netherlands) Tom Bleys	7
(Netherlands) Herman Scherpen Racing	Aprilia	Aprilia RS125R	77	(Netherlands) Herman Scherpen	7
(Netherlands) A.V. Racing Team	Aprilia	Aprilia RS125R	78	(Netherlands) Arno Visscher	7
(Italy) Debbia Racing Team	Yamaha	Yamaha TZ125	80	(Italy) Gabriele Debbia	8
(Italy) Speedy Racing	Honda	Honda RS125R	81	(Italy) Maurizio Cucchiarini	8
(United Kingdom) Cosgrove Coahces	Honda	Honda RS125R	82	(United Kingdom) Jason Davies	11
(Italy) Team Elit	Honda	Honda RS125R	83	(Italy) Paolo Tessari	8
(Italy) Piemme Racing Team	Honda	Honda RS125R	84	(Italy) Christian Pistoni	8
(Germany) Hein Gericke Castrol Junior	Honda	Honda RS125R	85	(Germany) Dirk Heidolf	9
(Germany) Hein Gericke Castrol Junior	Honda	Honda RS125R	89	(Germany) Klaus Nöhles	9
(Germany) Saeco Team Kelluer	Aprilia	Aprilia RS125R	86	(Germany) Emanuel Buchner	9, 12
(Germany) Castrol Kapitol Racing	Yamaha	Yamaha TZ125	87	(Germany) Alex Hofmann	9
(Germany) IMT Castrol Racing	Honda	Honda RS125R	90	(Germany) Oliver Perschke	9
(Brazil) Honda Brasil Racing Team	Honda	Honda RS125R	92	(Brazil) César Barros	10
(Brazil) Honda Brasil Racing Team	Honda	Honda RS125R	93	(Brazil) Eraldo Tome	10
(Brazil) Honda Brasil Racing Team	Honda	Honda RS125R	94	(Brazil) Renato Velludo	10
(Brazil) Honda Brasil Racing Team	Honda	Honda RS125R	95	(Brazil) Adilson Zaccari	10
(Brazil) Honda Brasil Racing Team	Honda	Honda RS125R	96	(Brazil) Cristiano Vieira	10
(Brazil) Honda Brasil Racing Team	Honda	Honda RS125R	97	(Brazil) Carlos Medeiros	10
(United Kingdom) Breadline Racing	Honda	Honda RS125R	99	(United Kingdom) Alan Green	11

Key
Regular Rider
Wildcard Rider
Replacement Rider

== Standings ==
=== Riders' standings ===
==== 500cc ====
Scoring system

Points were awarded to the top fifteen finishers. A rider had to finish the race to earn points.

Position	**1st**	**2nd**	**3rd**	**4th**	**5th**	**6th**	**7th**	**8th**	**9th**	**10th**	**11th**	**12th**	**13th**	**14th**	**15th**
Points	25	20	16	13	11	10	9	8	7	6	5	4	3	2	1

Pos	Rider	Bike	MAL (Malaysia)	JPN (Japan)	ESP (Spain)	ITA (Italy)	AUT (Austria)	FRA (France)	NED (Netherlands)	IMO (Bologna)	GER (Germany)	RIO (Rio de Janeiro (state))	GBR (United Kingdom)	CZE (Czech Republic)	CAT (Spain)	INA (Indonesia)	AUS (Australia)	Pts
1	(Australia) Mick Doohan	Honda	1	1	2	**1**	**1**	**1**	**1**	**1**	**1**	**1**	**1**	**1**	**1**	**2**	**Ret**	340
2	(Japan) Tadayuki Okada	Honda	**10**	**3**	**3**	Ret	2	3	12	5	2	2	2	Ret	6	1	4	197
3	(Japan) Nobuatsu Aoki	Honda	3	5	5	3	4	Ret	4	2	4	4	4	3	5	4	Ret	179
4	(Spain) Àlex Crivillé	Honda	2	2	1	4	5	4	DNS					4	3	3	1	172
5	(Japan) Takuma Aoki	Honda	5	4	4	Ret	Ret	5	Ret	3	3	DNS	10	6	7	7	2	134
6	(Italy) Luca Cadalora	Yamaha	4	11	11	2	3	Ret	Ret	6	Ret	3	5	2	4	Ret	Ret	129
7	(Japan) Norifumi Abe	Yamaha	8	7	7	7	9	7	10	7	Ret	5	9	5	12	5	3	126
8	(Spain) Carlos Checa	Honda	6	6	Ret	Ret	6	2	2	4	Ret	Ret	Ret	Ret	2	6	10	119
9	(Brazil) Alex Barros	Honda	11	10	8	6	13	6	6	9	6	Ret	3	8	Ret	Ret	8	101
10	(Italy) Doriano Romboni	Aprilia			6	11	10	11	3	Ret	5	7	7	Ret	10	10	11	88
11	(Australia) Daryl Beattie	Suzuki	Ret	Ret	12	5	11	12	7	13	12	13	6	10	17	12	DNS	63
12	(Spain) Alberto Puig	Honda	7	8	Ret	Ret	8	8	5	12	10	14	Ret	13	15	14	15	63
13	(Spain) Sete Gibernau	Yamaha	9	Ret	9	9	Ret	13	19	11	7	Ret	Ret	Ret	Ret	8	6	56
14	(France) Régis Laconi	Honda	12	12	10	10	Ret					9	Ret	7	11	16	5	52
15	(Australia) Anthony Gobert	Suzuki	DNS			13	7	10	13	10	9	10	Ret	12				44
16	(United States) Kenny Roberts Jr.	Modenas KR3	Ret	Ret	18	Ret	Ret	Ret	8	17	Ret	Ret	11	9	8	9	14	37
17	(Spain) Juan Borja	ELF 500	14	Ret	DNS	Ret	12	9	15	Ret	8	Ret	8	Ret	9	Ret	Ret	37
18	(France) Jean-Michel Bayle	Modenas KR3	Ret	14	13	8	14	Ret	Ret	8	Ret	8	DNS	Ret	Ret	Ret	16	31
19	(Netherlands) Jurgen van den Goorbergh	Honda	15	15	14	Ret	Ret	15	Ret	Ret	11	11	13	11	14	Ret	12	29
20	(Germany) Jürgen Fuchs	ELF 500	Ret	Ret	16	Ret	Ret	16	9	14	13	6	15	Ret	16	11	Ret	28
21	(Australia) Kirk McCarthy	ROC Yamaha	Ret	16	15	14	17	Ret	DNS	15	15	12						20
21	(Australia) Kirk McCarthy	Yamaha											12	Ret	13	15	13	20
22	(Australia) Peter Goddard	Suzuki		13	Ret											13	9	13
23	(Australia) Troy Corser	Yamaha	13	Ret	Ret	12	Ret	14	14									11
24	(Japan) Yukio Kagayama	Suzuki															7	9
25	(Japan) Norihiko Fujiwara	Yamaha		9														7
26	(France) Bernard Garcia	Honda						17	11	Ret	14							7
27	(Belgium) Laurent Naveau	ROC Yamaha	17	Ret	19	16	15	Ret	16	Ret	16	16	18	14	19	18	19	3
28	(United Kingdom) Jason Vincent	Honda											14					2
29	(Italy) Lucio Pedercini	ROC Yamaha	16	Ret	17	15	16	19	18	16	Ret	15	16	Ret	18	17	17	2
	(France) Frédéric Protat	ROC Yamaha	Ret	17	Ret													0
	(France) Frédéric Protat	Honda				17		18	17	18	Ret	17	17	Ret	Ret	Ret	18	0
	(Italy) Francesco Monaco	Paton				Ret				19								0
	(Italy) Alessandro Gramigni	Aprilia	Ret	DNS														0
Pos	Rider	Bike	MAL (Malaysia)	JPN (Japan)	ESP (Spain)	ITA (Italy)	AUT (Austria)	FRA (France)	NED (Netherlands)	IMO (Bologna)	GER (Germany)	RIO (Rio de Janeiro (state))	GBR (United Kingdom)	CZE (Czech Republic)	CAT (Spain)	INA (Indonesia)	AUS (Australia)	Pts

Colour	Result
Gold	Winner
Silver	Second place
Bronze	Third place
Green	Points classification
Blue	Non-points classification
Blue	Non-classified finish (NC)
Purple	Retired, not classified (Ret)
Red	Did not qualify (DNQ)
Red	Did not pre-qualify (DNPQ)
Black	Disqualified (DSQ)
White	Did not start (DNS)
White	Withdrew (WD)
White	Race cancelled (C)
Blank	Did not practice (DNP)
Blank	Did not arrive (DNA)
Blank	Excluded (EX)

**Bold** – Pole
Italics – Fastest Lap

==== 250cc ====
Scoring system

Points were awarded to the top fifteen finishers. A rider had to finish the race to earn points.

Position	**1st**	**2nd**	**3rd**	**4th**	**5th**	**6th**	**7th**	**8th**	**9th**	**10th**	**11th**	**12th**	**13th**	**14th**	**15th**
Points	25	20	16	13	11	10	9	8	7	6	5	4	3	2	1

Pos	Rider	Bike	MAL (Malaysia)	JPN (Japan)	ESP (Spain)	ITA (Italy)	AUT (Austria)	FRA (France)	NED (Netherlands)	IMO (Bologna)	GER (Germany)	RIO (Rio de Janeiro (state))	GBR (United Kingdom)	CZE (Czech Republic)	CAT (Spain)	INA (Indonesia)	AUS (Australia)	Pts
1	(Italy) Max Biaggi	Honda	**1**	7	3	1	3	2	DSQ	1	4	5	Ret	1	2	**1**	**2**	250
2	(Germany) Ralf Waldmann	Honda	4	5	**1**	4	**2**	3	2	4	3	12	1	**4**	**1**	7	1	248
3	(Japan) Tetsuya Harada	Aprilia	2	**3**	2	Ret	18	1	1	5	1	2	2	3	4	4	5	235
4	(France) Olivier Jacque	Honda	3	DNS	7	5	1	**Ret**	**Ret**	**2**	**2**	**1**	4	2	6	3	3	201
5	(Japan) Tohru Ukawa	Honda	6	2	Ret	Ret	5	5	4	3	6	3	5	5	3	2	8	173
6	(Italy) Loris Capirossi	Aprilia	Ret	11	Ret	3	4	4	3	Ret	5	4	**3**	Ret	5	14	DNS	116
7	(Japan) Takeshi Tsujimura	T.S. Honda	Ret	4	4	Ret	7	Ret	6	Ret	13	8	6	6	7	5	4	109
8	(Japan) Haruchika Aoki	Honda	5	8	5	14	8	6	Ret	8	9	7	8	Ret	8	6	14	102
9	(Italy) Stefano Perugini	Aprilia	Ret	Ret	6	7	6	Ret	5	Ret	Ret	6	7	7	Ret	8	7	85
10	(United Kingdom) Jeremy McWilliams	Honda	9	16	9	9	Ret	11	9	7	8	10	WD	Ret	11	10	10	73
11	(Argentina) Sebastián Porto	Aprilia	Ret	12	Ret	10	9	7	Ret	Ret	16	9	9	10	18	9	9	60
12	(Japan) Noriyasu Numata	Suzuki	14	9	8	6	10	Ret	Ret	Ret	7	Ret	10	Ret	9	Ret		55
13	(Japan) Osamu Miyazaki	Yamaha	11	Ret	12	15	Ret	10	8	9	18	Ret	Ret	14	10	13	11	47
14	(Italy) Franco Battaini	Yamaha	13	21	14	13	14	12	11	11	11		11	15	15	12	12	44
15	(Italy) Cristiano Migliorati	Honda	8	22	Ret	Ret	16	DNS	13	13	15	11	Ret	9	16	11	13	35
16	(Spain) Luis d'Antin	Yamaha	Ret	17	11	11	11	8	10	Ret	17	Ret	Ret		13	Ret	16	32
17	(Spain) Emilio Alzamora	Honda	7	DNS		Ret	DNS		Ret	10	10	14	Ret	12	12	Ret	Ret	31
18	(Italy) Marcellino Lucchi	Aprilia				**2**	Ret			6								30
19	(Japan) Daijiro Kato	Honda		1														25
20	(France) William Costes	Honda	Ret	Ret	19	17	13	9	7	12	20	Ret	Ret	Ret	Ret	17	Ret	23
21	(Spain) José Luis Cardoso	Honda	Ret	20	10	Ret	Ret	Ret	Ret	14	Ret	15	13	11	14	Ret	Ret	19
22	(United Kingdom) Jamie Robinson	Suzuki	Ret	14	16	8	12	WD	Ret	15	Ret	Ret		13	Ret	Ret	Ret	18
23	(Switzerland) Oliver Petrucciani	Aprilia	10	18	13	16	15		12	16	19	17	Ret	Ret	Ret	16	17	14
24	(Italy) Luca Boscoscuro	Honda	15	19	15	12	Ret	WD	Ret	Ret	14	13	Ret	Ret	17	15	15	13
25	(Italy) Giuseppe Fiorillo	Aprilia			Ret				Ret	Ret	12	16	Ret	8	Ret	Ret	Ret	12
26	(Japan) Yukio Kagayama	Suzuki		6														10
27	(Australia) Troy Bayliss	Suzuki															6	10
28	(Japan) Naoki Matsudo	Yamaha		10														6
29	(Spain) Eustaquio Gavira	Aprilia	12	Ret	17	Ret	19	DNS	15	Ret	21	19	Ret	16	Ret	Ret	Ret	5
30	(United Kingdom) Scott Smart	Honda											12					4
31	(Japan) Naoto Ogura	Yamaha		13														3
32	(France) Sébastien Gimbert	Honda						13										3
33	(Spain) Idalio Gavira	Aprilia	Ret	DNS	Ret	18	Ret	14	Ret	Ret	Ret	Ret	Ret	Ret				2
34	(Netherlands) Maurice Bolwerk	Honda							14					Ret				2
35	(United Kingdom) John McGuinnes	Aprilia											14					2
36	(Japan) Choujun Kameya	Suzuki		15														1
37	(Switzerland) Claudio Vanzetta	Aprilia						15						17				1
38	(United Kingdom) Callum Ramsay	Honda											15					1
	(France) Frederic Boutin	Aprilia						16										0
	(Netherlands) Gerard Rike	Honda							16									0
	(United Kingdom) Steve Sawford	Honda											16					0
	(Italy) Davide Bulega	Aprilia				DNS				17								0
	(Netherlands) Jaap Hoogeveen	Yamaha							17									0
	(United Kingdom) Gary May	Yamaha											17					0
	(United States) Kurtis Roberts	Aprilia	Ret	Ret	Ret	Ret	18	DNS				18						0
	(United States) Kurtis Roberts	Honda									22		18	18	19	DNQ	DNS	0
	(Spain) Oscar Sainz	Aprilia			18	Ret												0
	(Spain) Oscar Sainz	Yamaha												19				0
	(Netherlands) Henk Van De Lagemaat	Honda							18									0
	(Australia) William Strugnell	Honda															18	0
	(Italy) Walter Tortoroglio	Aprilia				19												0
	(Netherlands) Gert Pieper	Honda							19									0
	(Australia) Simon Weeks	Honda															19	0
	(Spain) Ismael Bonilla	Honda			Ret										20			0
	(Austria) Uwe Bolterhauer	Honda					20											0
	(Czech Republic) Radomil Rous	Yamaha												20				0
	(New Zealand) Ben Reid	Yamaha															20	0
	(Austria) Thomas Stadler	Honda					21											0
	(New Zealand) Michael Clunie	Yamaha															21	0
	(Germany) Jurgen Lingg	Honda									23							0
	(Germany) Matthias Neukirchner	Yamaha									24							0
	(Germany) Stefan Kruse	Honda									25							0
	(Spain) Jesus Perez	Honda			Ret										Ret			0
	(Spain) Javier Marsella	Honda			DNQ										Ret			0
	(Spain) José David de Gea	Yamaha			DNQ										Ret			0
	(Japan) Kensuke Haga	Yamaha		Ret														0
	(Spain) José Martin	Aprilia			Ret													0
	(Italy) Fabio Carpani	Aprilia				Ret												0
	(Austria) Jurgen Haim	Yamaha					Ret											0
	(Austria) Robert Zwidl	Aprilia					Ret											0
	(France) Bertrand Stey	Honda						Ret										0
	(France) Franck Poulle	Honda						Ret										0
	(Netherlands) Andre Romein	Honda							Ret									0
	(Argentina) Federico Gartner	Honda										Ret						0
	(Sweden) Johan Stigefelt	Suzuki										Ret						0
	(Czech Republic) Bohumil Staša Jr.	Aprilia												Ret				0
	(Slovakia) Vladimír Částka	Honda												Ret				0
	(Spain) David Guardiola	Honda													Ret			0
	(Spain) Manuel Luque	Aprilia													Ret			0
	(Austria) Mario Zehetner	Aprilia					DNQ											
	(France) Gilles Ferstler	Yamaha						DNQ										
	(France) Tony Falcone	Yamaha						DNQ										
	(Italy) Sandro Di Stefano	Honda								DNQ								
	(Venezuela) Francesco Pellegrino	Yamaha										DNQ						
	(New Zealand) Michael Tall	Yamaha															DNQ	
Pos	Rider	Bike	MAL (Malaysia)	JPN (Japan)	ESP (Spain)	ITA (Italy)	AUT (Austria)	FRA (France)	NED (Netherlands)	IMO (Bologna)	GER (Germany)	RIO (Rio de Janeiro (state))	GBR (United Kingdom)	CZE (Czech Republic)	CAT (Spain)	INA (Indonesia)	AUS (Australia)	Pts

Colour	Result
Gold	Winner
Silver	Second place
Bronze	Third place
Green	Points classification
Blue	Non-points classification
Blue	Non-classified finish (NC)
Purple	Retired, not classified (Ret)
Red	Did not qualify (DNQ)
Red	Did not pre-qualify (DNPQ)
Black	Disqualified (DSQ)
White	Did not start (DNS)
White	Withdrew (WD)
White	Race cancelled (C)
Blank	Did not practice (DNP)
Blank	Did not arrive (DNA)
Blank	Excluded (EX)

**Bold** – Pole
Italics – Fastest Lap

==== 125cc ====
Scoring system

Points were awarded to the top fifteen finishers. A rider had to finish the race to earn points.

Position	**1st**	**2nd**	**3rd**	**4th**	**5th**	**6th**	**7th**	**8th**	**9th**	**10th**	**11th**	**12th**	**13th**	**14th**	**15th**
Points	25	20	16	13	11	10	9	8	7	6	5	4	3	2	1

Pos	Rider	Bike	MAL (Malaysia)	JPN (Japan)	ESP (Spain)	ITA (Italy)	AUT (Austria)	FRA (France)	NED (Netherlands)	IMO (Bologna)	GER (Germany)	RIO (Rio de Janeiro (state))	GBR (United Kingdom)	CZE (Czech Republic)	CAT (Spain)	INA (Indonesia)	AUS (Australia)	Pts
1	(Italy) Valentino Rossi	Aprilia	**1**	Ret	1	1	2	1	**1**	**1**	**1**	1	1	3	1	1	6	321
2	(Japan) Noboru Ueda	Honda	3	**1**	2	4	**1**	Ret	4	5	Ret	**2**	3	1	3	4	1	238
3	(Japan) Tomomi Manako	Honda	7	12	5	5	3	2	2	2	Ret	4	8	2	5	5	3	190
4	(Japan) Kazuto Sakata	Aprilia	2	2	7	6	6	Ret	3	3	Ret	5	Ret	9	**2**	2	**2**	179
5	(Japan) Masaki Tokudome	Aprilia	5	13	4	7	5	DNS	7	Ret	9	10	2	8	11	6	8	120
6	(Spain) Jorge Martínez	Aprilia	6	5	**3**	**2**	Ret	DNS	6	6	6	7	Ret	Ret	12	**3**	13	119
7	(Australia) Garry McCoy	Aprilia	Ret	7	Ret	3	4	**3**	Ret	4	Ret	13	4	11	9	9	9	109
8	(Italy) Roberto Locatelli	Honda	17	11	8	14	8	Ret	8	7	Ret	11	5	4	7	10	4	97
9	(Italy) Mirko Giansanti	Aprilia	4	18	12	16	Ret	7	Ret	10	7	6	7	12	4	Ret	10	83
10	(France) Frédéric Petit	Honda	9	10	13	9	10	5	9	Ret	4	9	9	15	10	14	Ret	83
11	(Italy) Gianluigi Scalvini	Honda	16	9	21	12	9	8	13	11	12	Ret	11	6	8	7	5	81
12	(Japan) Youichi Ui	Yamaha	Ret	Ret	22	10	7	4	5	8	Ret	3	**Ret**	**10**	18	8	Ret	77
13	(Japan) Yoshiaki Katoh	Yamaha	8	6	10	15	Ret	6	Ret	12	2	16	6	Ret	13	21	14	74
14	(Italy) Lucio Cecchinello	Honda	10	Ret	15	8	Ret	Ret	Ret	Ret	5	8	10	5	6	13	7	73
15	(Japan) Masao Azuma	Honda	12	4	9	11	11	9	10	9	Ret	17	13	Ret	Ret	11	12	66
16	(Germany) Manfred Geissler	Honda	18	23	17	17			12	16								31
16	(Germany) Manfred Geissler	Aprilia					13	Ret			3	Ret	12	13	DNS	Ret	15	31
17	(Spain) Juan Enrique Maturana	Yamaha	Ret	24	19	18	14	11	14	Ret	10	15	15	16	Ret	17	11	22
18	(Italy) Ivan Goi	Aprilia	13	14	11	13	12	16	15	Ret	13	18	17	Ret				21
19	(Germany) Steve Jenkner	Aprilia	21	21	18	22	15	13	17	18	Ret	12	16	7	14	15	16	20
20	(Italy) Gino Borsoi	Yamaha	22	15	23	Ret	Ret	12	Ret	Ret	8	14	Ret	Ret	16	12	Ret	19
21	(Czech Republic) Jaroslav Huleš	Honda	11	Ret	14		Ret	Ret	11	13	Ret	DNS	Ret	14	Ret	20	Ret	17
22	(Japan) Hideyuki Nakajoh	Honda		3														16
23	(Germany) Peter Öttl	Aprilia	Ret	Ret	6	Ret			Ret	15								11
24	(Japan) Kazuhiro Takao	Honda		8														8
25	(Germany) Dirk Raudies	Honda	14	Ret	20	20	Ret	10	Ret	17	Ret	20	Ret	19	17	Ret	Ret	8
26	(Spain) Ángel Nieto Jr.	Aprilia	19	22	24	23	16	15	16	14	11	Ret	19	Ret	Ret	16	17	8
27	(Spain) Josep Sardá	Honda	15	19	26	19	Ret	14	Ret	Ret	Ret	19	Ret	18	DNS	19	18	3
28	(Germany) Alex Hofmann	Yamaha									14							2
29	(United Kingdom) Darren Barton	Honda											14					2
30	(Germany) Benny Jerzenbeck	Honda					Ret	18			15	Ret						1
31	(Spain) Álvaro Molina	Honda			Ret										15			1
	(Indonesia) Rudi Arianto	Yamaha														Ret		0
	(Indonesia) Irvan Octavianus	Yamaha														Ret		0
	(Indonesia) Ahmad Jayadi	Yamaha														Ret		0
	(Indonesia) Nasrul Arif	Honda														Ret		0
Pos	Rider	Bike	MAL (Malaysia)	JPN (Japan)	ESP (Spain)	ITA (Italy)	AUT (Austria)	FRA (France)	NED (Netherlands)	IMO (Bologna)	GER (Germany)	RIO (Rio de Janeiro (state))	GBR (United Kingdom)	CZE (Czech Republic)	CAT (Spain)	INA (Indonesia)	AUS (Australia)	Pts

Colour	Result
Gold	Winner
Silver	Second place
Bronze	Third place
Green	Points classification
Blue	Non-points classification
Blue	Non-classified finish (NC)
Purple	Retired, not classified (Ret)
Red	Did not qualify (DNQ)
Red	Did not pre-qualify (DNPQ)
Black	Disqualified (DSQ)
White	Did not start (DNS)
White	Withdrew (WD)
White	Race cancelled (C)
Blank	Did not practice (DNP)
Blank	Did not arrive (DNA)
Blank	Excluded (EX)

**Bold** – Pole
Italics – Fastest Lap

=== Manufacturers' standings ===
==== 500cc ====
Pos	Manufacturer	MAL (Malaysia)	JPN (Japan)	ESP (Spain)	ITA (Italy)	AUT (Austria)	FRA (France)	NED (Netherlands)	IMO (Bologna)	GER (Germany)	RIO (Rio de Janeiro (state))	GBR (United Kingdom)	CZE (Czech Republic)	CAT (Spain)	INA (Indonesia)	AUS (Australia)	Pts
1	(Japan) Honda	1	1	1	1	1	1	1	1	1	1	1	1	1	1	1	375
2	(Japan) Yamaha	4	7	7	2	3	7	10	6	7	3	5	2	4	5	3	188
3	(Japan) Suzuki	Ret	13	12	5	7	10	7	10	9	10	6	10	17	12	7	90
4	(Italy) Aprilia	Ret	DNS	6	11	10	11	3	Ret	5	7	7	Ret	10	10	11	88
5	(Malaysia) Modenas KR3	Ret	14	13	8	14	Ret	8	8	Ret	8	11	9	8	9	14	68
6	(France) ELF 500	14	Ret	16	Ret	12	9	9	14	8	6	8	Ret	9	11	Ret	60
7	(France) ROC Yamaha	16	16	15	14	15	19	16	15	15	12	16	14	18	17	17	12
Pos	Manufacturer	MAL (Malaysia)	JPN (Japan)	ESP (Spain)	ITA (Italy)	AUT (Austria)	FRA (France)	NED (Netherlands)	IMO (Bologna)	GER (Germany)	RIO (Rio de Janeiro (state))	GBR (United Kingdom)	CZE (Czech Republic)	CAT (Spain)	INA (Indonesia)	AUS (Australia)	Pts

==== 250cc ====
Pos	Manufacturer	MAL (Malaysia)	JPN (Japan)	ESP (Spain)	ITA (Italy)	AUT (Austria)	FRA (France)	NED (Netherlands)	IMO (Bologna)	GER (Germany)	RIO (Rio de Janeiro (state))	GBR (United Kingdom)	CZE (Czech Republic)	CAT (Spain)	INA (Indonesia)	AUS (Australia)	Pts
1	(Japan) Honda	1	1	1	1	1	2	2	1	2	1	1	1	1	1	1	360
2	(Italy) Aprilia	2	3	2	2	4	1	1	5	1	2	2	3	4	4	5	268
3	(Japan) T.S. Honda	Ret	4	4	Ret	7	Ret	6	Ret	13	8	6	6	7	5	4	109
4	(Japan) Yamaha	11	10	10	11	11	8	8	9	11	15	11	11	10	12	11	81
5	(Japan) Suzuki	14	6	8	6	10	Ret	Ret	15	7	Ret	10	13	9	Ret	6	72
Pos	Manufacturer	MAL (Malaysia)	JPN (Japan)	ESP (Spain)	ITA (Italy)	AUT (Austria)	FRA (France)	NED (Netherlands)	IMO (Bologna)	GER (Germany)	RIO (Rio de Janeiro (state))	GBR (United Kingdom)	CZE (Czech Republic)	CAT (Spain)	INA (Indonesia)	AUS (Australia)	Pts

==== 125cc ====
Pos	Manufacturer	MAL (Malaysia)	JPN (Japan)	ESP (Spain)	ITA (Italy)	AUT (Austria)	FRA (France)	NED (Netherlands)	IMO (Bologna)	GER (Germany)	RIO (Rio de Janeiro (state))	GBR (United Kingdom)	CZE (Czech Republic)	CAT (Spain)	INA (Indonesia)	AUS (Australia)	Pts
1	(Italy) Aprilia	1	2	1	1	2	1	1	1	1	1	1	3	1	1	2	351
2	(Japan) Honda	3	1	2	4	1	2	2	2	4	2	3	1	3	4	1	287
3	(Japan) Yamaha	8	6	10	10	7	4	5	8	2	3	6	10	13	8	11	139
Pos	Manufacturer	MAL (Malaysia)	JPN (Japan)	ESP (Spain)	ITA (Italy)	AUT (Austria)	FRA (France)	NED (Netherlands)	IMO (Bologna)	GER (Germany)	RIO (Rio de Janeiro (state))	GBR (United Kingdom)	CZE (Czech Republic)	CAT (Spain)	INA (Indonesia)	AUS (Australia)	Pts
