= Oliver Petrucciani =

Swiss motorcycle racer

- Nationality: (Switzerland) Swiss
- Born: September 6, 1969 (age 57)
Motorcycle racing career statistics
Grand Prix motorcycle racing
Active years	1990 - 1997
First race	1990 125cc Nations Grand Prix
Last race	1997 250cc Austrian Grand Prix
Starts / Wins / Podiums / Poles / F. laps / Points; 92 / 0 / 0 / 0 / 0 / 207

Oliver Petrucciani (born September 6, 1969 in Losone) was a Grand Prix motorcycle road racer from Switzerland. His best year was in 1993 when he finished in seventh place in the 125cc world championship.
