= Noriyasu Numata =

Japanese motorcycle racer

- Nationality: Japanese
- Born: April 26, 1966; Chiba, Japan
- Died: September 4, 2007 (aged 41); Mimasaka, Japan
Motorcycle racing career statistics
Grand Prix motorcycle racing
Active years	1995–1999
First race	1995 250cc Japanese Grand Prix
Last race	1999 500cc Japanese Grand Prix
Team(s)	Suzuki, MuZ
Starts / Wins / Podiums / Poles / F. laps / Points; 31 / 0 / 1 / 0 / 0 / 130
Superbike World Championship
Active years	2003
Starts / Wins / Podiums / Poles / F. laps / Points; 2 / 0 / 0 / 0 / 0 / 0
Supersport World Championship
Active years	2000
Starts / Wins / Podiums / Poles / F. laps / Points; 1 / 0 / 0 / 0 / 0 / 0

Noriyasu Numata (沼田憲保, Numata Noriyasu; 26 April 1966 – 4 September 2007) was a Grand Prix motorcycle road racer born in Chiba, Japan. He competed in 250cc Grand Prix motorcycle racing from 1995 to 1998. He was killed in an accident during tyre testing for Dunlop at Okayama International Circuit in Japan.

== Early career ==
Numata competed in the 250cc All-Japan Road Racing Championship from 1991 to 1996. In 1993 he was signed by Suzuki who were entering the Championship for the first time with the RGV250. Numata took the machine to its first victory at Round 9 of the championship. He went on to give Suzuki its first ever 250cc national title in 1995, beating Honda’s Tohru Ukawa, and repeated the feat again the following year beating future 250cc World Champion Daijiro Kato.

== Grand Prix career ==
Numata got a wild card ride in both the 1995 and 1996 Japanese Grand Prix and while a non-finisher in 1995, rode an impressive race in 1996 to finish second behind then 250cc World Champion Max Biaggi.

Numata then competed for two years in the 250cc World Championships with Suzuki. However, the machine received little development as the factory were concentrating on their 500cc effort. Numata finished 1997 in 12th position, and 1998 in 16th but in each case he finished well ahead of his team-mates on similar machinery.

In 1999, Numata had a one-off ride on the MuZ 500 as a replacement rider for Luca Cadalora in the 500cc class, finishing 13th in the race.

== Post Grand Prix career ==
Numata also made one-off appearances in Supersport World Championship and Superbike World Championship races in 2000 and 2003, but retired on each occasion. Numata, like many of the top Japanese riders, was also a regular competitor in the Suzuka 8 Hours Endurance race. He competed in the event on seven occasions between 1991 and 2002, his best finish being a fourth place in 1993 partnered with Akira Yanagawa. From 2004 to 2007, he competed in the All Japan Road Race Championships in the 600cc class, finishing fifth and sixth in 2004 and 2005 respectively. At the time of his death, he held 11th place in the 2007 Championship.
