= Anthony Gobert =

Australian motorcycle racer (1975–2024)

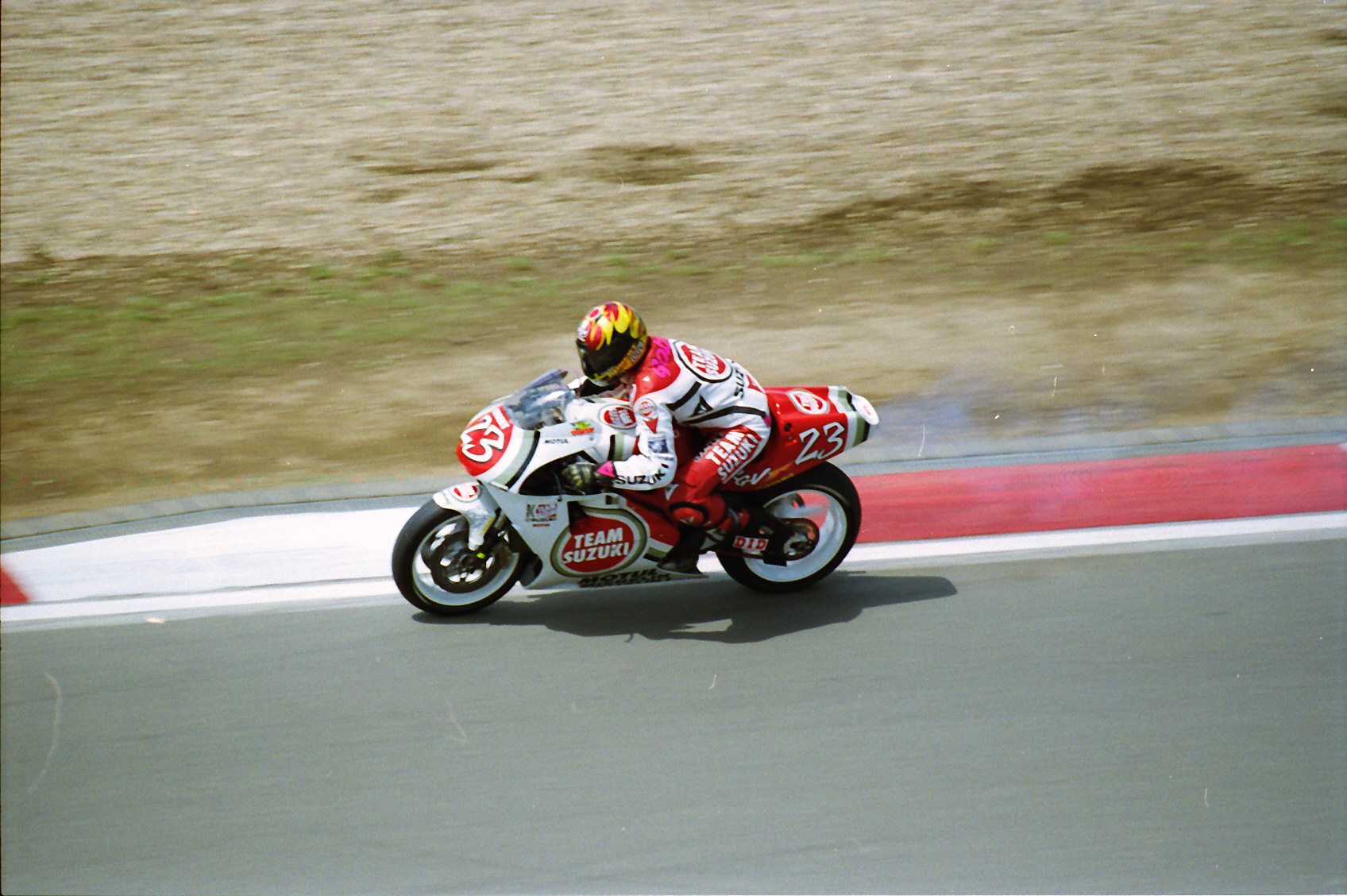
- Gobert at the 1997 German motorcycle Grand Prix
- Nationality: Australian
- Born: 5 March 1975; Greenacre, New South Wales, Australia
- Died: 17 January 2024 (aged 48); Gold Coast, Queensland, Australia
Motorcycle racing career statistics
Grand Prix motorcycle racing
Active years	1997, 1999 - 2000
Team(s)	Suzuki, MuZ Weber, Modenas
Championships	0
Starts / Wins / Podiums / Poles / F. laps / Points; 13 / 0 / 0 / 0 / 0 / 51
Superbike World Championship
Active years	1994-1996, 1999-2000, 2006
Manufacturers	Honda, Kawasaki, Bimota, Yamaha, Suzuki
2006 championship position	N/C
Starts / Wins / Podiums / Poles / F. laps / Points; 57 / 8 / 16 / 2 / 2 / 504
Supersport World Championship
Active years	2006
Manufacturers	Yamaha
2006 championship position	35th (4 pts)
Starts / Wins / Podiums / Poles / F. laps / Points; 2 / 0 / 0 / 0 / 0 / 3

Anthony Stephen Gobert (5 March 1975 – 17 January 2024) was an Australian professional motorcycle road racer, nicknamed The Go Show. He was a rider of immense promise and talent who had his career derailed by a personal struggle with alcohol and drug abuse. Winning the final leg of the 1994 season at Phillip Island, he became the youngest ever World Superbike race winner at the age of 19 years old, a record that was broken by 18-year-old Yuichi Takeda at Sugo in 1996.

== Superbikes/Supersport ==
In his teens, Gobert was a successful motocross racer, winning the Australian Supercross Masters Championship in 1992, and various other national classes in Australia, before moving to road racing and winning the Australian Superbike Championship in 1994. He first earned international notice as a wild card at his home Superbike World Championship round at Phillip Island in 1994, taking pole position, a win and a third place. Racing full-time in the championship for Muzzy Kawasaki in 1995, he became team leader after Scott Russell's abrupt departure and finished fourth overall, winning races at Laguna Seca and Phillip Island. He was eighth in 1996, with three wins and three other podiums, after missing much of the season through injury.

For 1998 and 1999, Gobert competed in the AMA Superbike Championship on a Vance & Hines Ducati, including a win as a WSBK wildcard at Laguna Seca.

For 2000, Gobert returned to WSBK on a Bimota SB8R. With the race number 501, he won a wet race at Phillip Island and generally did better than expected on the machine, before the team folded, due to lack of financial backing. Bimota named the SB8K Gobert bike after him. Three British Superbike meetings (substituting for Steve Hislop at Team Virgin Mobile Yamaha) followed in late 2000.

For 2001, Gobert was back in the AMA championship with Yamaha, spending two years racing the YZF R7 in the superbike class and the YZF R6 in the supersport class respectively. This was followed by a brief dalliance with Ducati in 2003. After some time back in the Australian Superbike series, he did two rounds of Supersport World Championship at the start of 2006, replacing the injured David Checa. In 2006, he raced at the Valencia Superbike World Championship round (making him the first rider to have wildcard rides in three different countries), alongside some rounds of Spain's Superbike series. For 2007, he returned to Australia Superbikes on a Kawasaki.

== Grand Prix ==
Gobert went to the 500cc World Championship in 1997 with the Lucky Strike Suzuki replacing Scott Russell as the number one rider, but was dismissed in mid-season after failing a drug test.

Gobert raced for MuZ Weber at the end of 1999 season

A 500cc one-off at Donington Park for Kenny Roberts' KR3 Modenas Team followed in late 2000.

== Personal life ==
According to a report in The Courier-Mail, the 33-year-old Gobert was charged with two counts of stealing after taking two $20 notes from the hand of a 70-year-old man at a Coles supermarket in Surfers Paradise on 13 May 2008 and stealing a woman's purse the following day. He was granted bail on condition that he surrender his passport, report to police five times a week and not enter central Surfers Paradise.

In June 2019, Gobert was reported to have been involved in an altercation at a restaurant. Afterwards, he was followed home by a number of individuals whom he had earlier fought with. They forced their way into Gobert's home, robbed him, and beat him with baseball bats. He was beaten beyond recognition. Hospital staff were only able to identify him after he had regained consciousness.

== Death ==
In January 2024, news agencies reported that Gobert had been receiving end-of-life care on the Gold Coast, Queensland, for an undisclosed illness. He died on 17 January, at the age of 48.

== Career results ==
=== Grand Prix motorcycle racing ===
==== Races by year ====
(key) (Races in bold indicate pole position, races in italics indicate fastest lap)

Year	Class	Bike	1	2	3	4	5	6	7	8	9	10	11	12	13	14	15	16	Pos.	Pts
1997	500cc	Suzuki	MAL; DNS	JPN	SPA	ITA; 13	AUT; 7	FRA; 10	NED; 13	IMO; 10	GER; 9	BRA; 10	GBR; Ret	CZE; 12	CAT	INA	AUS		15th	44
1999	500cc	MuZ Weber	MAL	JPN	SPA	FRA	ITA	CAT	NED	GBR	GER	CZE	IMO	VAL	AUS; Ret	RSA; 18	BRA; 10	ARG; DNS	25th	6
2000	500cc	Modenas	RSA	MAL	JPN	SPA	FRA	ITA	CAT	NED	GBR; 15	GER	CZE	POR	VAL	BRA	PAC	AUS	29th	1

=== Superbike World Championship ===
==== Races by year ====
(key) (Races in bold indicate pole position) (Races in italics indicate fastest lap)

Year	Make	1		2		3		4		5		6		7		8		9		10		11		12		13		Pos.	Pts
Year	Make	R1	R2	R1	R2	R1	R2	R1	R2	R1	R2	R1	R2	R1	R2	R1	R2	R1	R2	R1	R2	R1	R2	R1	R2	R1	R2	Pos.	Pts
1994	Honda	GBR	GBR	GER	GER	ITA	ITA	SPA	SPA	AUT	AUT	INA	INA	JPN; 8	JPN; 6	NED	NED	SMR	SMR	EUR	EUR							17th	53
1994	Kawasaki																					**AUS**; 3	**AUS**; 1					17th	53
1995	Kawasaki	GER; 16	GER; Ret	SMR; 6	SMR; 16	GBR; 10	GBR; Ret	ITA; Ret	ITA; 12	SPA; 7	SPA; DNS	AUT; 2	AUT; 3	USA; 1	USA; 2	EUR; 3	EUR; 5	JPN; 5	JPN; 9	NED; 9	NED; 7	INA; 4	INA; 4	**AUS**; Ret	**AUS**; 1			4th	222
1996	Kawasaki	SMR; 5	SMR; DSQ	GBR; 3	GBR; 3	GER; 6	GER; Ret	ITA; Ret	ITA; 10	CZE; Ret	CZE; 19	USA; Ret	USA; 1	EUR; 2	EUR; 4	INA; DNS	INA; DNS	JPN	JPN	NED	NED	SPA	SPA	AUS; 1	AUS; 1			8th	167
1999	Ducati	RSA	RSA	AUS	AUS	GBR	GBR	SPA	SPA	ITA	ITA	GER	GER	SMR	SMR	USA; 1	USA; Ret	EUR	EUR	AUT	AUT	NED	NED	GER	GER	JPN	JPN	24th	25
2000	Bimota	RSA; Ret	RSA; 11	AUS; 1	AUS; 9	JPN; Ret	JPN; Ret	GBR	GBR	ITA; 22	ITA; Ret	GER; Ret	GER; Ret	SMR	SMR	SPA	SPA	USA	USA	EUR	EUR	NED	NED	GER	GER			25th	37
2000	Yamaha																									GBR; Ret	GBR; Ret	25th	37
2002	Yamaha	SPA	SPA	AUS	AUS	RSA	RSA	JPN	JPN	ITA	ITA	GBR	GBR	GER	GER	SMR	SMR	USA; DNS	USA; DNS	GBR	GBR	GER	GER	NED	NED	ITA	ITA	NC	0
2006	Suzuki	QAT	QAT	AUS	AUS	SPA; DNS	SPA; DNS	ITA	ITA	EUR	EUR	SMR	SMR	CZE	CZE	GBR	GBR	NED	NED	GER	GER	ITA	ITA	FRA	FRA			NC	0

=== AMA Superstock Championship ===
==== By year ====
Year	Class	Bike	1	2	3	4	5	6	7	8	9	10	11	Pos	Pts
2004	Superstock	Honda	DAY	FON; 16	INF	BAR	PPK	RAM	BRD	LAG	M-O	RAT	VIR	39th	15

=== Supersport World Championship ===
==== Races by year ====
(key) (Races in bold indicate pole position, races in italics indicate fastest lap)

Year	Bike	1	2	3	4	5	6	7	8	9	10	11	12	Pos.	Pts
2006	Yamaha	QAT; 12	AUS; Ret	SPA	ITA	EUR	SMR	CZE	GBR	NED	GER	ITA	FRA	35th	4

Preceded by Troy Corser	Australian Superbike Champion; 1994	Succeeded by Kirk McCarthy
