= 1999 Argentine motorcycle Grand Prix =

(Argentina) 1999 Argentine Grand Prix
Race details
- Race 16 of 16 races in the 1999 Grand Prix motorcycle racing season
- Date: 31 October 1999
- Official name: Gran Premio Marlboro de Argentina
- Location: Autódromo Juan y Oscar Gálvez
- Course: Permanent racing facility; 4.350 km (2.703 mi)

500cc
Pole position
- Rider: (United States) Kenny Roberts Jr.
- Time: 1:44.354
Fastest lap
- Rider: (United States) Kenny Roberts Jr.
- Time: 1:44.781 on lap 5
Podium
- First: (United States) Kenny Roberts Jr.
- Second: (Italy) Max Biaggi
- Third: (Japan) Norick Abe

250cc
Pole position
- Rider: (Italy) Valentino Rossi
- Time: 1:45.844
Fastest lap
- Rider: (France) Olivier Jacque
- Time: 1:45.734 on lap 4
Podium
- First: (France) Olivier Jacque
- Second: (Japan) Tohru Ukawa
- Third: (Italy) Valentino Rossi

125cc
Pole position
- Rider: (Japan) Masao Azuma
- Time: 1:50.160
Fastest lap
- Rider: (Italy) Marco Melandri
- Time: 1:50.140 on lap 6
Podium
- First: (Italy) Marco Melandri
- Second: (Spain) Emilio Alzamora
- Third: (Italy) Roberto Locatelli

The 1999 Argentine motorcycle Grand Prix was the last round of the 1999 Grand Prix motorcycle racing season. It took place on 31 October 1999 at the Autódromo Oscar Alfredo Gálvez in Buenos Aires.

== 500 cc classification ==
Pos.	No.	Rider	Team	Manufacturer	Laps	Time/Retired	Grid	Points
1	10	(United States) Kenny Roberts Jr.	Suzuki Grand Prix Team	Suzuki	27	47:23.710	1	25
2	2	(Italy) Max Biaggi	Marlboro Yamaha Team	Yamaha	27	+2.033	4	20
3	6	(Japan) Norick Abe	Antena 3 Yamaha d'Antin	Yamaha	27	+2.631	6	16
4	4	(Spain) Carlos Checa	Marlboro Yamaha Team	Yamaha	27	+4.340	7	13
5	3	(Spain) Àlex Crivillé	Repsol Honda Team	Honda	27	+4.451	3	11
6	15	(Spain) Sete Gibernau	Repsol Honda Team	Honda	27	+24.878	13	10
7	19	(United States) John Kocinski	Kanemoto Nettaxi Honda	Honda	27	+25.338	11	9
8	5	(Brazil) Alex Barros	Team Telefónica Unifón	Honda	27	+26.387	10	8
9	14	(Spain) Juan Borja	Team Telefónica Unifón	Honda	27	+31.868	9	7
10	17	(Netherlands) Jurgen van den Goorbergh	Team Biland GP1	MuZ Weber	27	+37.536	5	6
11	31	(Japan) Tetsuya Harada	Aprilia Grand Prix Racing	Aprilia	27	+38.553	16	5
12	55	(France) Régis Laconi	Red Bull Yamaha WCM	Yamaha	27	+47.953	18	4
13	24	(Australia) Garry McCoy	Red Bull Yamaha WCM	Yamaha	27	+48.083	17	3
14	68	(Australia) Mark Willis	Buckley Systems BSL Racing	Modenas KR3	27	+52.512	14	2
15	26	(Japan) Haruchika Aoki	FCC TSR	TSR-Honda	27	+53.237	15	1
16	25	(Spain) José Luis Cardoso	Team Maxon TSR	TSR-Honda	27	+1:27.780	12	
17	22	(France) Sébastien Gimbert	Tecmas Honda Elf	Honda	27	+1:27.951	20	
18	20	(United States) Mike Hale	Proton KR Modenas	Modenas KR3	27	+1:45.173	21	
19	21	(United Kingdom) Michael Rutter	Millar Honda	Honda	26	+1 lap	22	
20	37	(Australia) Steve Martin	Dee Cee Jeans Racing Team	Honda	26	+1 lap	23	
Ret	52	(Spain) José David de Gea	Proton KR Modenas	Modenas KR3	14	Accident	19	
Ret	8	(Japan) Tadayuki Okada	Repsol Honda Team	Honda	12	Accident	2	
Ret	9	(Japan) Nobuatsu Aoki	Suzuki Grand Prix Team	Suzuki	6	Retirement	8	
DNS	35	(Australia) Anthony Gobert	Team Biland GP1	MuZ Weber		Did not start		

== 250 cc classification ==
Pos.	No.	Rider	Manufacturer	Laps	Time/Retired	Grid	Points
1	19	(France) Olivier Jacque	Yamaha	25	44:34.817	2	25
2	4	(Japan) Tohru Ukawa	Honda	25	+9.236	7	20
3	46	(Italy) Valentino Rossi	Aprilia	25	+17.573	1	16
4	12	(Argentina) Sebastián Porto	Yamaha	25	+21.735	4	13
5	56	(Japan) Shinya Nakano	Yamaha	25	+26.791	9	11
6	7	(Italy) Stefano Perugini	Honda	25	+33.162	3	10
7	44	(Italy) Roberto Rolfo	Aprilia	25	+33.673	8	9
8	14	(Australia) Anthony West	TSR-Honda	25	+40.963	20	8
9	11	(Japan) Tomomi Manako	Yamaha	25	+44.523	6	7
10	66	(Germany) Alex Hofmann	TSR-Honda	25	+50.445	15	6
11	6	(Germany) Ralf Waldmann	Aprilia	25	+52.881	10	5
12	24	(United Kingdom) Jason Vincent	Honda	25	+1:10.078	17	4
13	18	(United Kingdom) Scott Smart	Aprilia	25	+1:10.268	18	3
14	10	(Spain) Fonsi Nieto	Yamaha	25	+1:10.481	16	2
15	36	(Japan) Masaki Tokudome	TSR-Honda	25	+1:11.156	12	1
16	41	(Netherlands) Jarno Janssen	TSR-Honda	25	+1:13.021	24	
17	17	(Netherlands) Maurice Bolwerk	TSR-Honda	25	+1:13.279	21	
18	16	(Sweden) Johan Stigefelt	Yamaha	25	+1:19.235	19	
19	95	(Argentina) Leandro Mulet	Honda	24	+1 lap	28	
20	98	(Argentina) Leandro Giuggia	Yamaha	24	+1 lap	29	
Ret	1	(Italy) Loris Capirossi	Honda	18	Retirement	11	
Ret	94	(Argentina) Gabriel Borgmann	Yamaha	10	Accident	25	
Ret	15	(Spain) David García	Yamaha	9	Retirement	22	
Ret	23	(France) Julien Allemand	TSR-Honda	7	Retirement	14	
Ret	37	(Italy) Luca Boscoscuro	TSR-Honda	6	Accident	13	
Ret	96	(Argentina) Diego Pierluiggi	Honda	6	Accident	26	
Ret	21	(Italy) Franco Battaini	Aprilia	2	Retirement	5	
Ret	58	(Argentina) Matías Ríos	Aprilia	1	Retirement	23	
Ret	32	(Germany) Markus Barth	Yamaha	0	Accident	27	
DNS	9	(United Kingdom) Jeremy McWilliams	Aprilia		Did not start		
DNQ	97	(Argentina) Roger Buffa	Yamaha		Did not qualify		

== 125 cc classification ==
Pos.	No.	Rider	Manufacturer	Laps	Time/Retired	Grid	Points
1	13	(Italy) Marco Melandri	Honda	23	42:37.380	2	25
2	7	(Spain) Emilio Alzamora	Honda	23	+0.219	3	20
3	15	(Italy) Roberto Locatelli	Aprilia	23	+1.104	4	16
4	23	(Italy) Gino Borsoi	Aprilia	23	+7.437	6	13
5	32	(Italy) Mirko Giansanti	Aprilia	23	+26.706	16	11
6	16	(Italy) Simone Sanna	Honda	23	+31.421	13	10
7	8	(Italy) Gianluigi Scalvini	Aprilia	23	+32.023	10	9
8	26	(Italy) Ivan Goi	Honda	23	+42.968	14	8
9	22	(Spain) Pablo Nieto	Derbi	23	+47.164	21	7
10	12	(France) Randy de Puniet	Aprilia	23	+49.693	18	6
11	11	(Italy) Max Sabbatani	Honda	23	+53.118	12	5
12	9	(France) Frédéric Petit	Aprilia	23	+53.329	20	4
13	24	(Denmark) Robbin Harms	Aprilia	23	+57.343	23	3
Ret	18	(Germany) Reinhard Stolz	Honda	22	Retirement	11	
Ret	54	(San Marino) Manuel Poggiali	Aprilia	20	Accident	5	
Ret	6	(Japan) Noboru Ueda	Honda	17	Accident	7	
Ret	21	(France) Arnaud Vincent	Aprilia	16	Retirement	17	
Ret	29	(Spain) Ángel Nieto, Jr.	Honda	11	Retirement	19	
Ret	17	(Germany) Steve Jenkner	Aprilia	10	Accident	15	
Ret	5	(Italy) Lucio Cecchinello	Honda	7	Accident	9	
Ret	10	(Spain) Jerónimo Vidal	Aprilia	6	Retirement	8	
Ret	1	(Japan) Kazuto Sakata	Honda	3	Retirement	22	
Ret	4	(Japan) Masao Azuma	Honda	1	Accident	1	
Ret	99	(United States) Jason DiSalvo	Honda	0	Accident	24	
DNS	41	(Japan) Youichi Ui	Derbi		Did not start		
DNQ	87	(Argentina) Franco Lessio	Yamaha		Did not qualify		

== Championship standings after the race (500cc) ==
Below are the standings for the top five riders and constructors after round sixteen has concluded.

Riders' Championship standings

Pos.	Rider	Points
1	(Spain) Àlex Crivillé	267
2	(United States) Kenny Roberts Jr.	220
3	(Japan) Tadayuki Okada	211
4	(Italy) Max Biaggi	194
5	(Spain) Sete Gibernau	165

Constructors' Championship standings

Pos.	Constructor	Points
1	(Japan) Honda	338
2	(Japan) Yamaha	280
3	(Japan) Suzuki	231
4	(Italy) Aprilia	104
5	(Germany) MuZ Weber	64

- Note: Only the top five positions are included for both sets of standings.

Previous race: 1999 Rio de Janeiro Grand Prix	FIM Grand Prix World Championship; 1999 season	Next race: 2000 South African Grand Prix
Previous race: 1998 Argentine Grand Prix	Argentine Grand Prix	Next race: 2014 Argentine Grand Prix
