= 1999 Rio de Janeiro motorcycle Grand Prix =

(Rio de Janeiro (state)) 1999 Rio de Janeiro Grand Prix
Race details
- Race 15 of 16 races in the 1999 Grand Prix motorcycle racing season
- Date: 24 October 1999
- Official name: Telefônica Celular Rio Grand Prix
- Location: Autódromo Internacional Nelson Piquet
- Course: Permanent racing facility; 4.933 km (3.065 mi)

500cc
Pole position
- Rider: (United States) Kenny Roberts Jr.
- Time: 1:52.227
Fastest lap
- Rider: (Italy) Max Biaggi
- Time: 1:52.869 on lap 10
Podium
- First: (Japan) Norick Abe
- Second: (Italy) Max Biaggi
- Third: (United States) Kenny Roberts Jr.

250cc
Pole position
- Rider: (France) Olivier Jacque
- Time: 1:54.072
Fastest lap
- Rider: (Italy) Valentino Rossi
- Time: 1:54.230 on lap 20
Podium
- First: (Italy) Valentino Rossi
- Second: (Japan) Tohru Ukawa
- Third: (Italy) Loris Capirossi

125cc
Pole position
- Rider: (Italy) Marco Melandri
- Time: 1:59.490
Fastest lap
- Rider: (Italy) Marco Melandri
- Time: 1:59.801 on lap 20
Podium
- First: (Japan) Noboru Ueda
- Second: (Italy) Marco Melandri
- Third: (Spain) Emilio Alzamora

The 1999 Rio de Janeiro motorcycle Grand Prix was the fifteenth round of the 1999 Grand Prix motorcycle racing season. It took place on 24 October 1999 at the Autódromo Internacional Nelson Piquet.

This was the last race without a current or former premier class champion on the grid until the 2020 Aragon Grand Prix.

Valentino Rossi won the 250cc race and the title at this event his 2nd title in his young career

== 500 cc classification ==
Pos.	No.	Rider	Team	Manufacturer	Laps	Time/Retired	Grid	Points
1	6	(Japan) Norick Abe	Antena 3 Yamaha d'Antin	Yamaha	24	45:24.308	12	25
2	2	(Italy) Max Biaggi	Marlboro Yamaha Team	Yamaha	24	+0.161	6	20
3	10	(United States) Kenny Roberts Jr.	Suzuki Grand Prix Team	Suzuki	24	+0.257	1	16
4	5	(Brazil) Alex Barros	Team Telefônica Celular	Honda	24	+4.442	3	13
5	15	(Spain) Sete Gibernau	Repsol Honda Team	Honda	24	+4.631	2	11
6	3	(Spain) Àlex Crivillé	Repsol Honda Team	Honda	24	+21.254	11	10
7	8	(Japan) Tadayuki Okada	Repsol Honda Team	Honda	24	+21.525	5	9
8	24	(Australia) Garry McCoy	Red Bull Yamaha WCM	Yamaha	24	+22.394	10	8
9	9	(Japan) Nobuatsu Aoki	Suzuki Grand Prix Team	Suzuki	24	+23.089	9	7
10	35	(Australia) Anthony Gobert	Team Biland GP1	MuZ Weber	24	+30.275	8	6
11	55	(France) Régis Laconi	Red Bull Yamaha WCM	Yamaha	24	+41.314	14	5
12	31	(Japan) Tetsuya Harada	Aprilia Grand Prix Racing	Aprilia	24	+41.648	18	4
13	19	(United States) John Kocinski	Kanemoto Nettaxi Honda	Honda	24	+42.757	15	3
14	52	(Spain) José David de Gea	Proton KR Modenas	Modenas KR3	24	+43.380	16	2
15	26	(Japan) Haruchika Aoki	FCC TSR	TSR-Honda	24	+45.652	19	1
16	68	(Australia) Mark Willis	Buckley Systems BSL Racing	Modenas KR3	24	+48.740	21	
17	25	(Spain) José Luis Cardoso	Team Maxon TSR	TSR-Honda	24	+1:14.209	17	
18	22	(France) Sébastien Gimbert	Tecmas Honda Elf	Honda	24	+1:27.360	23	
Ret	14	(Spain) Juan Borja	Team Telefônica Celular	Honda	7	Retirement	13	
Ret	17	(Netherlands) Jurgen van den Goorbergh	Team Biland GP1	MuZ Weber	4	Retirement	7	
Ret	20	(United States) Mike Hale	Proton KR Modenas	Modenas KR3	4	Retirement	20	
Ret	4	(Spain) Carlos Checa	Marlboro Yamaha Team	Yamaha	1	Accident	4	
Ret	21	(United Kingdom) Michael Rutter	Millar Honda	Honda	1	Retirement	24	
Ret	37	(Australia) Steve Martin	Dee Cee Jeans Racing Team	Honda	0	Retirement	22	

== 250 cc classification ==
Pos.	No.	Rider	Manufacturer	Laps	Time/Retired	Grid	Points
1	46	(Italy) Valentino Rossi	Aprilia	22	42:17.893	2	25
2	4	(Japan) Tohru Ukawa	Honda	22	+1.328	9	20
3	1	(Italy) Loris Capirossi	Honda	22	+1.944	4	16
4	19	(France) Olivier Jacque	Yamaha	22	+2.342	1	13
5	7	(Italy) Stefano Perugini	Honda	22	+2.395	8	11
6	12	(Argentina) Sebastián Porto	Yamaha	22	+13.031	5	10
7	6	(Germany) Ralf Waldmann	Aprilia	22	+15.483	10	9
8	11	(Japan) Tomomi Manako	Yamaha	22	+16.222	12	8
9	44	(Italy) Roberto Rolfo	Aprilia	22	+41.230	13	7
10	37	(Italy) Luca Boscoscuro	TSR-Honda	22	+43.002	11	6
11	24	(United Kingdom) Jason Vincent	Honda	22	+43.012	14	5
12	66	(Germany) Alex Hofmann	TSR-Honda	22	+54.010	18	4
13	23	(France) Julien Allemand	TSR-Honda	22	+1:12.641	17	3
14	18	(United Kingdom) Scott Smart	Aprilia	22	+1:12.746	16	2
15	56	(Japan) Shinya Nakano	Yamaha	22	+1:12.791	3	1
16	41	(Netherlands) Jarno Janssen	TSR-Honda	22	+1:32.120	19	
17	10	(Spain) Fonsi Nieto	Yamaha	22	+1:32.440	20	
18	58	(Argentina) Matías Ríos	Aprilia	22	+1:42.432	23	
19	16	(Sweden) Johan Stigefelt	Yamaha	22	+1:44.838	21	
Ret	32	(Germany) Markus Barth	Yamaha	20	Retirement	24	
Ret	14	(Australia) Anthony West	TSR-Honda	15	Retirement	15	
Ret	9	(United Kingdom) Jeremy McWilliams	Aprilia	13	Retirement	6	
Ret	21	(Italy) Franco Battaini	Aprilia	5	Retirement	7	
Ret	15	(Spain) David García	Yamaha	1	Retirement	22	
DNS	17	(Netherlands) Maurice Bolwerk	TSR-Honda		Did not start		
WD	36	(Japan) Masaki Tokudome	TSR-Honda		Withdrew		

== 125 cc classification ==
Pos.	No.	Rider	Manufacturer	Laps	Time/Retired	Grid	Points
1	6	(Japan) Noboru Ueda	Honda	21	42:14.647	6	25
2	13	(Italy) Marco Melandri	Honda	21	+0.131	1	20
3	7	(Spain) Emilio Alzamora	Honda	21	+0.977	12	16
4	32	(Italy) Mirko Giansanti	Aprilia	21	+1.055	5	13
5	23	(Italy) Gino Borsoi	Aprilia	21	+1.297	8	11
6	4	(Japan) Masao Azuma	Honda	21	+1.457	2	10
7	54	(San Marino) Manuel Poggiali	Aprilia	21	+1.689	3	9
8	15	(Italy) Roberto Locatelli	Aprilia	21	+2.025	4	8
9	16	(Italy) Simone Sanna	Honda	21	+2.280	11	7
10	41	(Japan) Youichi Ui	Derbi	21	+20.740	7	6
11	26	(Italy) Ivan Goi	Honda	21	+24.150	15	5
12	10	(Spain) Jerónimo Vidal	Aprilia	21	+24.424	13	4
13	21	(France) Arnaud Vincent	Aprilia	21	+29.529	16	3
14	11	(Italy) Max Sabbatani	Honda	21	+30.710	14	2
15	29	(Spain) Ángel Nieto Jr.	Honda	21	+30.755	19	1
16	17	(Germany) Steve Jenkner	Aprilia	21	+49.281	20	
17	1	(Japan) Kazuto Sakata	Honda	21	+52.716	22	
18	12	(France) Randy de Puniet	Aprilia	21	+52.850	18	
19	18	(Germany) Reinhard Stolz	Honda	21	+52.955	21	
20	9	(France) Frédéric Petit	Aprilia	21	+53.422	17	
21	5	(Italy) Lucio Cecchinello	Honda	21	+1:06.648	10	
22	24	(Denmark) Robbin Harms	Aprilia	21	+1:21.345	24	
23	97	(Brazil) César Barros	Honda	21	+1:30.648	27	
24	96	(Brazil) Cristiano Vieira	Honda	21	+1:31.895	25	
25	99	(United States) Jason DiSalvo	Honda	21	+1:50.098	26	
26	95	(Brazil) Renato Velludo	Honda	20	+1 lap	28	
Ret	22	(Spain) Pablo Nieto	Derbi	10	Retirement	23	
Ret	8	(Italy) Gianluigi Scalvini	Aprilia	4	Accident	9	
DNS	44	(Italy) Alessandro Brannetti	Aprilia		Did not start		
DNQ	98	(Brazil) Alexander Di Grandi	Honda		Did not qualify		

== Championship standings after the race (500cc) ==
Below are the standings for the top five riders and constructors after round fifteen has concluded.

Riders' Championship standings

Pos.	Rider	Points
1	(Spain) Àlex Crivillé	256
2	(Japan) Tadayuki Okada	211
3	(United States) Kenny Roberts Jr.	195
4	(Italy) Max Biaggi	174
5	(Spain) Sete Gibernau	155

Constructors' Championship standings

Pos.	Constructor	Points
1	(Japan) Honda	327
2	(Japan) Yamaha	260
3	(Japan) Suzuki	206
4	(Italy) Aprilia	99
5	(Germany) MuZ Weber	58

- Note: Only the top five positions are included for both sets of standings.

Previous race: 1999 South African Grand Prix	FIM Grand Prix World Championship; 1999 season	Next race: 1999 Argentine Grand Prix
Previous race: 1997 Rio de Janeiro Grand Prix	Rio de Janeiro Grand Prix	Next race: 2000 Rio de Janeiro Grand Prix
