= 2001 Rio de Janeiro motorcycle Grand Prix =

(Rio de Janeiro (state)) 2001 Rio de Janeiro Grand Prix
Race details
- Race 16 of 16 races in the 2001 Grand Prix motorcycle racing season
- Date: 3 November 2001
- Official name: Cinzano Rio Grand Prix
- Location: Autódromo Internacional Nelson Piquet
- Course: Permanent racing facility; 4.933 km (3.065 mi)

500cc
Pole position
- Rider: (Japan) Tohru Ukawa
- Time: 1:51.431
Fastest lap
- Rider: (Italy) Valentino Rossi
- Time: 1:53.258 on lap 16
Podium
- First: (Italy) Valentino Rossi
- Second: (Spain) Carlos Checa
- Third: (Italy) Max Biaggi

250cc
Pole position
- Rider: (Spain) Fonsi Nieto
- Time: 1:53.819
Fastest lap
- Rider: (Italy) Marco Melandri
- Time: 1:55.315 on lap 22
Podium
- First: (Japan) Daijiro Kato
- Second: (Italy) Marco Melandri
- Third: (Italy) Roberto Locatelli

125cc
Pole position
- Rider: (Japan) Youichi Ui
- Time: 1:58.676
Fastest lap
- Rider: (Italy) Simone Sanna
- Time: 2:11.067 on lap 6
Podium
- First: (Japan) Youichi Ui
- Second: (Italy) Simone Sanna
- Third: (France) Arnaud Vincent

The 2001 Rio de Janeiro motorcycle Grand Prix was the sixteenth and latest round of the 2001 Grand Prix motorcycle racing season. It took place on the weekend of 1–3 November 2001 at the Autódromo Internacional Nelson Piquet. It was also the final 500cc race in Grand Prix motorcycle racing history. This also marked the final Grand Prix win in the career of Daijiro Kato before his death caused by a crash in the 2003 Japanese motorcycle Grand Prix race.

== 500 cc classification ==
The race was held in two parts as rain caused its interruption; aggregate times from the two heats determined the final result.

Pos.	No.	Rider	Team	Manufacturer	Laps	Time/Retired	Grid	Points
1	46	(Italy) Valentino Rossi	Nastro Azzurro Honda	Honda	24	45:57.414	5	25
2	7	(Spain) Carlos Checa	Marlboro Yamaha Team	Yamaha	24	+0.143	7	20
3	3	(Italy) Max Biaggi	Marlboro Yamaha Team	Yamaha	24	+6.980	10	16
4	4	(Brazil) Alex Barros	West Honda Pons	Honda	24	+19.053	12	13
5	65	(Italy) Loris Capirossi	West Honda Pons	Honda	24	+20.655	2	11
6	6	(Japan) Norifumi Abe	Antena 3 Yamaha d'Antin	Yamaha	24	+20.829	9	10
7	28	(Spain) Àlex Crivillé	Repsol YPF Honda Team	Honda	24	+27.894	14	9
8	10	(Spain) José Luis Cardoso	Antena 3 Yamaha d'Antin	Yamaha	24	+45.110	15	8
9	56	(Japan) Shinya Nakano	Gauloises Yamaha Tech 3	Yamaha	24	+2:25.532	4	7
10	5	(Australia) Garry McCoy	Red Bull Yamaha WCM	Yamaha	23	+1 lap	13	6
11	9	(United Kingdom) Leon Haslam	Shell Advance Honda	Honda	23	+1 lap	18	5
12	15	(Spain) Sete Gibernau	Telefónica Movistar Suzuki	Suzuki	23	+1 lap	6	4
13	14	(Australia) Anthony West	Dee Cee Jeans Racing Team	Honda	22	+2 laps	16	3
14	12	(Japan) Haruchika Aoki	Arie Molenaar Racing	Honda	22	+2 laps	17	2
15	18	(Australia) Brendan Clarke	Shell Advance Honda	Honda	22	+2 laps	19	1
16	1	(United States) Kenny Roberts Jr.	Telefónica Movistar Suzuki	Suzuki	22	+2 laps	3	
17	21	(Netherlands) Barry Veneman	Dee Cee Jeans Racing Team	Honda	22	+2 laps	20	
Ret	11	(Japan) Tohru Ukawa	Repsol YPF Honda Team	Honda	7	Retirement	1	
Ret	17	(Netherlands) Jurgen van den Goorbergh	Proton Team KR	Proton KR	1	Retirement	11	
Ret	19	(France) Olivier Jacque	Gauloises Yamaha Tech 3	Yamaha	0	Retirement	8	
DNS	41	(Japan) Noriyuki Haga	Red Bull Yamaha WCM	Yamaha		Did not start		

== 250 cc classification ==
Pos.	No.	Rider	Manufacturer	Laps	Time/Retired	Grid	Points
1	74	(Japan) Daijiro Kato	Honda	22	43:38.212	2	25
2	5	(Italy) Marco Melandri	Aprilia	22	+0.508	7	20
3	15	(Italy) Roberto Locatelli	Aprilia	22	+1.382	4	16
4	10	(Spain) Fonsi Nieto	Aprilia	22	+3.569	1	13
5	99	(United Kingdom) Jeremy McWilliams	Aprilia	22	+3.846	3	11
6	31	(Japan) Tetsuya Harada	Aprilia	22	+11.032	5	10
7	7	(Spain) Emilio Alzamora	Honda	22	+14.786	11	9
8	44	(Italy) Roberto Rolfo	Aprilia	22	+26.769	12	8
9	8	(Japan) Naoki Matsudo	Yamaha	22	+42.705	6	7
10	21	(Italy) Franco Battaini	Aprilia	22	+45.602	9	6
11	50	(France) Sylvain Guintoli	Aprilia	22	+46.659	19	5
12	57	(Italy) Lorenzo Lanzi	Aprilia	22	+55.054	18	4
13	81	(France) Randy de Puniet	Aprilia	22	+1:00.211	8	3
14	11	(Italy) Riccardo Chiarello	Aprilia	22	+1:04.153	14	2
15	22	(Spain) José David de Gea	Yamaha	22	+1:04.281	21	1
16	6	(Spain) Alex Debón	Aprilia	22	+1:04.807	10	
17	66	(Germany) Alex Hofmann	Aprilia	22	+1:06.148	13	
18	37	(Italy) Luca Boscoscuro	Aprilia	22	+1:24.059	15	
19	45	(United Kingdom) Stuart Edwards	Yamaha	21	+1 lap	29	
20	24	(United Kingdom) Jason Vincent	Yamaha	21	+1 lap	23	
21	36	(Spain) Luis Costa	Yamaha	21	+1 lap	28	
22	42	(Spain) David Checa	Honda	21	+1 lap	20	
23	18	(Malaysia) Shahrol Yuzy	Yamaha	21	+1 lap	16	
24	23	(Brazil) César Barros	Yamaha	21	+1 lap	27	
25	27	(Australia) Shaun Geronimi	Yamaha	20	+2 laps	25	
26	14	(Germany) Katja Poensgen	Honda	20	+2 laps	30	
Ret	9	(Argentina) Sebastián Porto	Yamaha	15	Retirement	17	
Ret	55	(Italy) Diego Giugovaz	Aprilia	10	Retirement	24	
Ret	41	(Spain) Dámaso Nácher	Honda	8	Retirement	31	
Ret	16	(Spain) David Tomás	Honda	3	Accident	22	
Ret	84	(Brazil) Cristiano Vieira	Yamaha	3	Accident	26	
DNQ	85	(Brazil) Rafael da Cunha	Honda		Did not qualify		

== 125 cc classification ==
Pos.	No.	Rider	Manufacturer	Laps	Time/Retired	Grid	Points
1	41	(Japan) Youichi Ui	Derbi	21	46:47.181	1	25
2	16	(Italy) Simone Sanna	Aprilia	21	+0.112	9	20
3	21	(France) Arnaud Vincent	Honda	21	+27.647	14	16
4	24	(Spain) Toni Elías	Honda	21	+32.325	4	13
5	54	(San Marino) Manuel Poggiali	Gilera	21	+37.646	5	11
6	15	(San Marino) Alex de Angelis	Honda	21	+42.052	18	10
7	4	(Japan) Masao Azuma	Honda	21	+42.563	21	9
8	18	(Czech Republic) Jakub Smrž	Honda	21	+42.642	8	8
9	8	(Italy) Gianluigi Scalvini	Italjet	21	+42.867	20	7
10	39	(Czech Republic) Jaroslav Huleš	Honda	21	+43.854	15	6
11	25	(Spain) Joan Olivé	Honda	21	+1:11.667	7	5
12	10	(Germany) Jarno Müller	Honda	21	+1:11.675	24	4
13	5	(Japan) Noboru Ueda	TSR-Honda	21	+1:18.050	17	3
14	22	(Spain) Pablo Nieto	Derbi	21	+1:50.142	28	2
15	19	(Italy) Alessandro Brannetti	Aprilia	21	+1:56.893	26	1
16	77	(Spain) Adrián Araujo	Honda	21	+2:01.428	30	
17	17	(Germany) Steve Jenkner	Aprilia	21	+2:05.356	12	
18	12	(Spain) Raúl Jara	Aprilia	21	+2:09.956	23	
19	48	(Brazil) Leandro Panadés	Honda	21	+2:10.408	31	
20	23	(Italy) Gino Borsoi	Aprilia	20	+1 lap	10	
Ret	26	(Spain) Daniel Pedrosa	Honda	12	Accident	3	
Ret	50	(Italy) Andrea Ballerini	Aprilia	6	Accident	2	
Ret	31	(Spain) Ángel Rodríguez	Aprilia	6	Accident	11	
Ret	7	(Italy) Stefano Perugini	Italjet	5	Accident	16	
Ret	9	(Italy) Lucio Cecchinello	Aprilia	3	Accident	6	
Ret	11	(Italy) Max Sabbatani	Aprilia	3	Retirement	13	
Ret	34	(Andorra) Eric Bataille	Honda	1	Accident	29	
Ret	37	(San Marino) William de Angelis	Honda	1	Accident	27	
Ret	28	(Hungary) Gábor Talmácsi	Honda	1	Retirement	19	
Ret	29	(Spain) Ángel Nieto Jr.	Honda	0	Accident	22	
Ret	6	(Italy) Mirko Giansanti	Honda	0	Accident	25	

== Championship standings after the race (500cc) ==
Below are the standings for the top five riders and constructors after round sixteen has concluded.

Riders' Championship standings

Pos.	Rider	Points
1	(Italy) Valentino Rossi	325
2	(Italy) Max Biaggi	219
3	(Italy) Loris Capirossi	210
4	(Brazil) Alex Barros	182
5	(Japan) Shinya Nakano	155

Constructors' Championship standings

Pos.	Constructor	Points
1	(Japan) Honda	367
2	(Japan) Yamaha	295
3	(Japan) Suzuki	153
4	(Malaysia) Proton KR	65
5	(United Kingdom) Sabre V4	6

- Note: Only the top five positions are included for both sets of standings.

Previous race: 2001 Malaysian Grand Prix	FIM Grand Prix World Championship; 2001 season	Next race: 2002 Japanese Grand Prix
Previous race: 2000 Rio de Janeiro Grand Prix	Rio de Janeiro Grand Prix	Next race: 2002 Rio de Janeiro Grand Prix
