= Ilmor X3 =

Ilmor GP
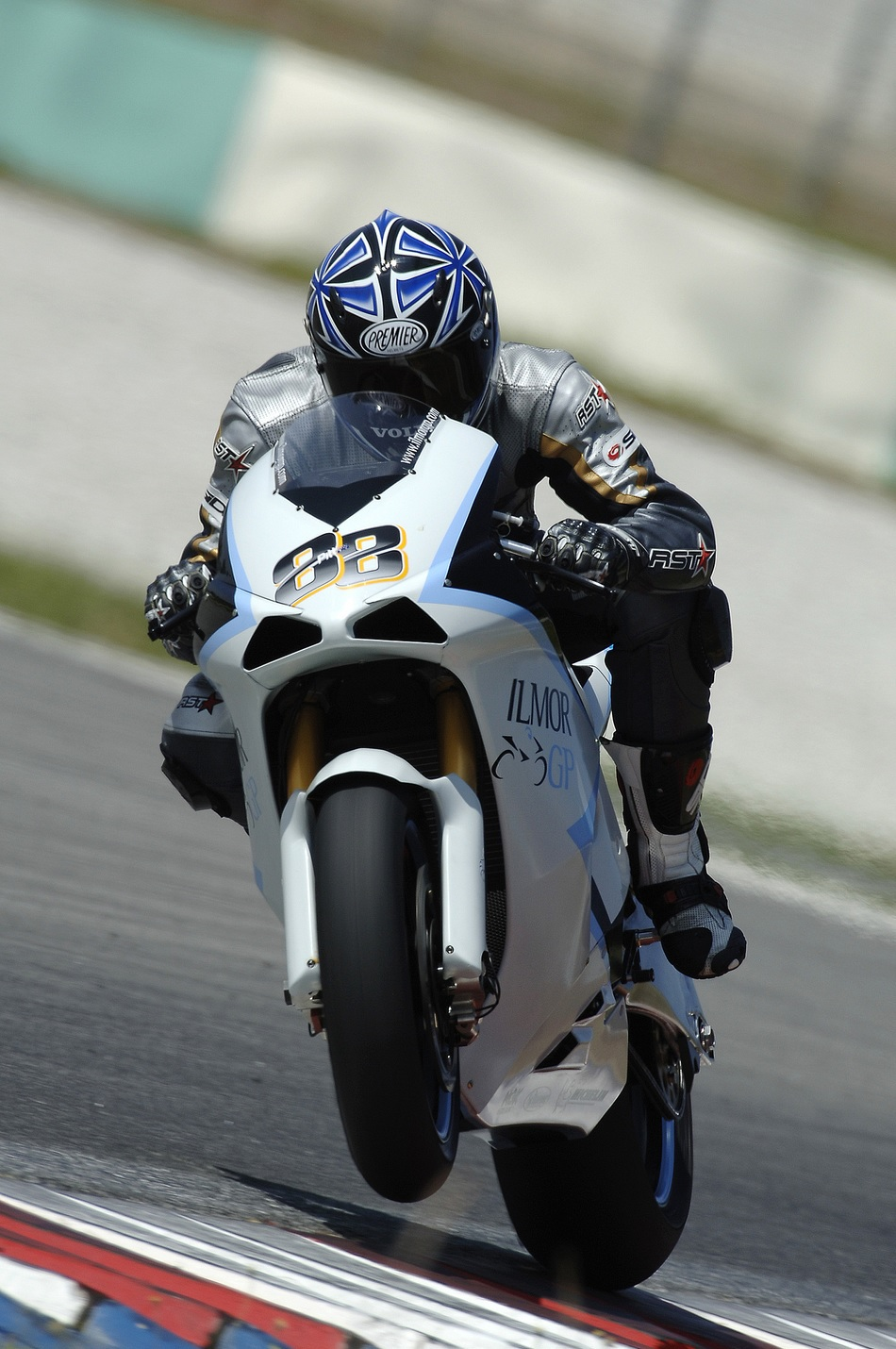
- Manufacturer: Ilmor
- Also called: Ilmor X³
- Production: 2006–2007
- Class: MotoGP
- Engine: 800 cc four-stroke 70° V4

The X3 (stylized as the X^{3}) is an 800 cc V4 race bike built by Ilmor Engineering to compete in the 2007 MotoGP series.

The X3 is the brainchild of Ilmor co-founder Mario Illien and former grand prix rider Eskil Suter of Suter Racing Technology (SRT). Illien used his world championship winning F1 engine experience to design the machine's V4 powerplant, with Suter, who has previously designed Kawasaki's MotoGP chassis, in charge of the twin-spar aluminum frame.

== 2006 season ==
With rider Garry McCoy, the X3 made its debut as a wildcard entry at the 2006 Portuguese Grand Prix and then two weeks later at the 2006 Valencia Grand Prix where the emphasis was more on testing than competition. McCoy exceeded expectations, putting in consistent performances to bring the Ilmor team their first two championship points and the first ever points awarded for an 800 cc capacity bike, though McCoy arrived last in both occasions, four and seven laps down respectively.

== 2007 season ==
McCoy worked as a test rider for on the X3 development team and was expected to ride for Ilmor in 2007, but Andrew Pitt and Jeremy McWilliams were chosen instead. On 15 March 2007 after one race, the team announced that they were taking a break from MotoGP as a result of funding issues. On 30 April they announced that they would run a "slimmed-down" set-up focused purely on engine development, releasing all unnecessary personnel but keeping under contract riders McWilliams and Pitt.

In June 2007, the Ilmor X3 resurfaced at the Goodwood Festival of Speed where McWilliams performed a public demonstration with the intention of attracting sponsorship for the team. While no sponsors stepped up for the team following the event, the bike itself did receive the Most Impressive Motorcycle award, which McWilliams accepted on behalf of the team.

In October 2007, new reports of the Ilmor X3 potentially returning to the grid appeared after the team opened talks of a strategic partnership with Team KR. Team KR went as far as building a new chassis for the V4 Ilmor engine and testing it with Andrew Pitt. The fate of the deal rested on Team KR acquiring budget from their primary sponsor, MGM Grand Hotel Treasure Island, and Ilmor accepting Team KR's demands to use their own electronics. However, both the sponsorship deal on Team Roberts' side, nor the technical deal on Ilmor's side, fell through.

In late 2007, Ilmor conducted one final private test at Jerez after re-hiring most of the staff they’d previously laid off before quietly shutting down the team and project for good.

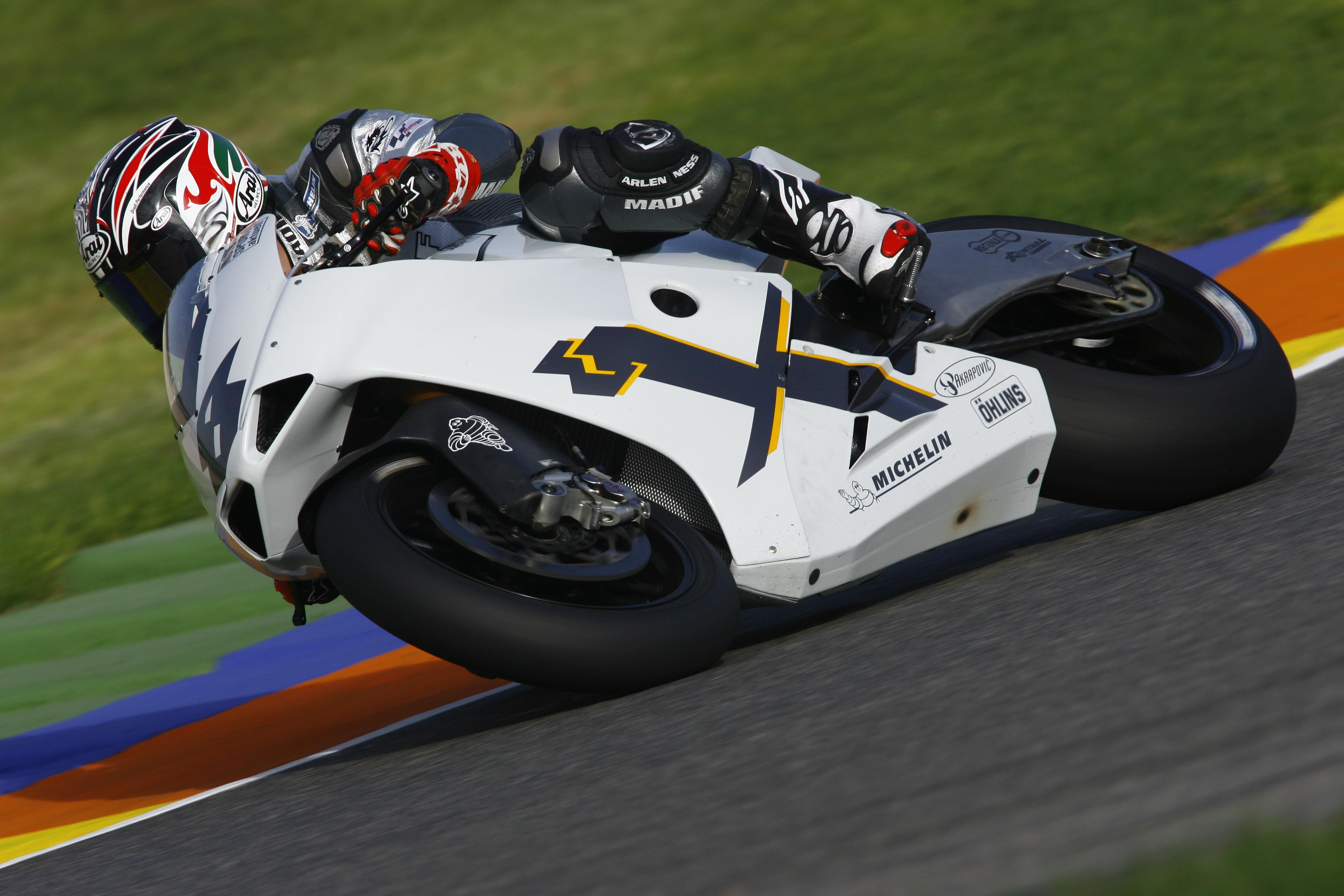
Garry McCoy riding the Ilmor X3 at the 2006 Valencia Grand Prix.

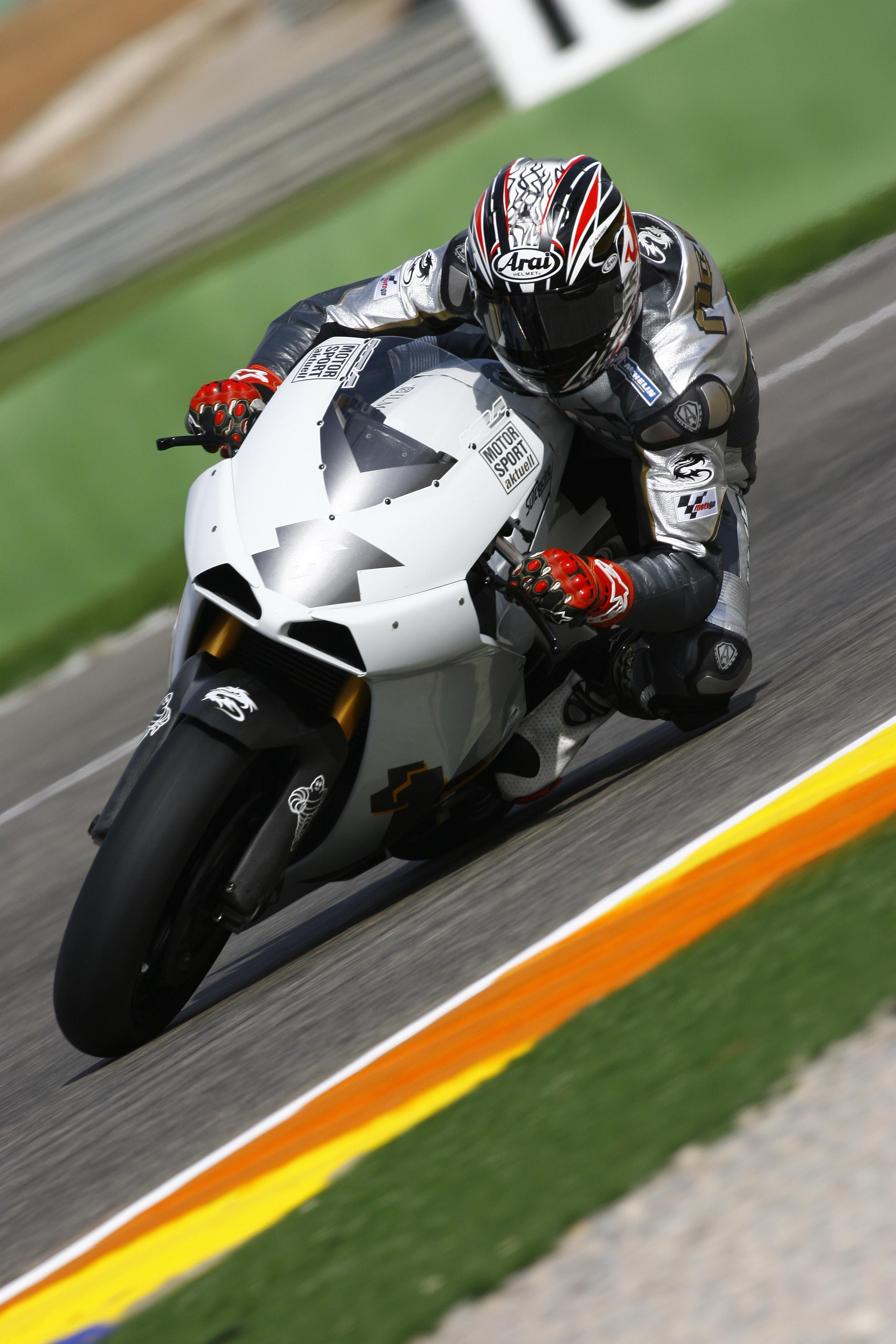
