= 2000 Rio de Janeiro motorcycle Grand Prix =

(Rio de Janeiro (state)) 2000 Rio de Janeiro Grand Prix
Race details
- Race 14 of 16 races in the 2000 Grand Prix motorcycle racing season
- Date: 7 October 2000
- Official name: Cinzano Rio Grand Prix
- Location: Autódromo Internacional Nelson Piquet
- Course: Permanent racing facility; 4.933 km (3.065 mi)

500cc
Pole position
- Rider: (Italy) Max Biaggi
- Time: 1:51.058
Fastest lap
- Rider: (Italy) Valentino Rossi
- Time: 1:52.667 on lap 22
Podium
- First: (Italy) Valentino Rossi
- Second: (Brazil) Alex Barros
- Third: (Australia) Garry McCoy

250cc
Pole position
- Rider: (Italy) Marco Melandri
- Time: 1:53.464
Fastest lap
- Rider: (France) Olivier Jacque
- Time: 1:54.394 on lap 2
Podium
- First: (Japan) Daijiro Kato
- Second: (Japan) Tohru Ukawa
- Third: (Italy) Marco Melandri

125cc
Pole position
- Rider: (Italy) Roberto Locatelli
- Time: 1:59.011
Fastest lap
- Rider: (Italy) Mirko Giansanti
- Time: 1:59.368 on lap 3
Podium
- First: (Italy) Simone Sanna
- Second: (Japan) Masao Azuma
- Third: (Japan) Youichi Ui

The 2000 Rio de Janeiro motorcycle Grand Prix was the fourteenth round of the 2000 Grand Prix motorcycle racing season. It took place on 7 October 2000 at the Autódromo Internacional Nelson Piquet. Kenny Roberts Jr sealed the world title at this race by finishing in 6th place. Suzuki's last world championship until 2020 when Joan Mir won the title with Suzuki

== 500 cc classification ==
| Pos. | No. | Rider | Team | Manufacturer | Laps | Time/Retired | Grid | Points |
|---|---|---|---|---|---|---|---|---|
| 1 | 46 | (Italy) Valentino Rossi | Nastro Azzurro Honda | Honda | 24 | 45:22.624 | 4 | 25 |
| 2 | 10 | (Brazil) Alex Barros | Emerson Honda Pons | Honda | 24 | +0.970 | 2 | 20 |
| 3 | 24 | (Australia) Garry McCoy | Red Bull Yamaha WCM | Yamaha | 24 | +3.446 | 13 | 16 |
| 4 | 6 | (Japan) Norick Abe | Antena 3 Yamaha d'Antin | Yamaha | 24 | +3.568 | 6 | 13 |
| 5 | 4 | (Italy) Max Biaggi | Marlboro Yamaha Team | Yamaha | 24 | +3.709 | 1 | 11 |
| 6 | 2 | (United States) Kenny Roberts Jr. | Telefónica Movistar Suzuki | Suzuki | 24 | +7.778 | 7 | 10 |
| 7 | 5 | (Spain) Sete Gibernau | Repsol YPF Honda Team | Honda | 24 | +8.260 | 11 | 9 |
| 8 | 55 | (France) Régis Laconi | Red Bull Yamaha WCM | Yamaha | 24 | +8.518 | 9 | 8 |
| 9 | 8 | (Japan) Tadayuki Okada | Repsol YPF Honda Team | Honda | 24 | +17.506 | 8 | 7 |
| 10 | 17 | (Netherlands) Jurgen van den Goorbergh | Rizla Honda | TSR-Honda | 24 | +23.254 | 10 | 6 |
| 11 | 1 | (Spain) Àlex Crivillé | Repsol YPF Honda Team | Honda | 24 | +28.802 | 12 | 5 |
| 12 | 9 | (Japan) Nobuatsu Aoki | Telefónica Movistar Suzuki | Suzuki | 24 | +34.134 | 15 | 4 |
| 13 | 31 | (Japan) Tetsuya Harada | Blu Aprilia Team | Aprilia | 24 | +54.359 | 16 | 3 |
| 14 | 68 | (Australia) Mark Willis | Proton Team KR | Modenas KR3 | 24 | +1:03.182 | 17 | 2 |
| 15 | 7 | (Spain) Carlos Checa | Marlboro Yamaha Team | Yamaha | 24 | +1:03.506 | 3 | 1 |
| 16 | 25 | (Spain) José Luis Cardoso | Maxon Dee Cee Jeans | Honda | 24 | +1:21.941 | 18 | |
| 17 | 33 | (Spain) David Tomás | Sabre Sport | Honda | 23 | +1 lap | 19 | |
| 18 | 15 | (Japan) Yoshiteru Konishi | FCC TSR | TSR-Honda | 23 | +1 lap | 20 | |
| Ret | 65 | (Italy) Loris Capirossi | Emerson Honda Pons | Honda | 2 | Accident | 5 | |
| Ret | 99 | (United Kingdom) Jeremy McWilliams | Blu Aprilia Team | Aprilia | 2 | Retirement | 14 | |
| DNQ | 18 | (Belgium) Sébastien Le Grelle | Tecmas Honda Elf | Honda | | Did not qualify | | |

== 250 cc classification ==
| Pos. | No. | Rider | Manufacturer | Laps | Time/Retired | Grid | Points |
|---|---|---|---|---|---|---|---|
| 1 | 74 | (Japan) Daijiro Kato | Honda | 22 | 42:14.822 | 3 | 25 |
| 2 | 4 | (Japan) Tohru Ukawa | Honda | 22 | +0.064 | 6 | 20 |
| 3 | 35 | (Italy) Marco Melandri | Aprilia | 22 | +0.190 | 1 | 16 |
| 4 | 56 | (Japan) Shinya Nakano | Yamaha | 22 | +13.788 | 5 | 13 |
| 5 | 14 | (Australia) Anthony West | Honda | 22 | +19.087 | 13 | 11 |
| 6 | 6 | (Germany) Ralf Waldmann | Aprilia | 22 | +19.236 | 7 | 10 |
| 7 | 21 | (Italy) Franco Battaini | Aprilia | 22 | +24.786 | 4 | 9 |
| 8 | 9 | (Argentina) Sebastián Porto | Yamaha | 22 | +31.874 | 12 | 8 |
| 9 | 24 | (United Kingdom) Jason Vincent | Aprilia | 22 | +41.546 | 10 | 7 |
| 10 | 37 | (Italy) Luca Boscoscuro | Aprilia | 22 | +45.904 | 9 | 6 |
| 11 | 10 | (Spain) Fonsi Nieto | Yamaha | 22 | +55.630 | 15 | 5 |
| 12 | 8 | (Japan) Naoki Matsudo | Yamaha | 22 | +55.670 | 16 | 4 |
| 13 | 11 | (Italy) Ivan Clementi | Aprilia | 22 | +55.980 | 18 | 3 |
| 14 | 22 | (France) Sébastien Gimbert | TSR-Honda | 22 | +56.327 | 20 | 2 |
| 15 | 23 | (France) Julien Allemand | Yamaha | 22 | +56.491 | 24 | 1 |
| 16 | 25 | (France) Vincent Philippe | TSR-Honda | 22 | +56.713 | 21 | |
| 17 | 26 | (Germany) Klaus Nöhles | Aprilia | 22 | +1:08.066 | 14 | |
| 18 | 15 | (United Kingdom) Adrian Coates | Aprilia | 22 | +1:12.784 | 27 | |
| 19 | 41 | (Netherlands) Jarno Janssen | TSR-Honda | 22 | +1:23.491 | 23 | |
| 20 | 31 | (Spain) Lucas Oliver | Yamaha | 22 | +1:39.172 | 25 | |
| 21 | 20 | (Spain) Jerónimo Vidal | Aprilia | 22 | +1:41.493 | 17 | |
| Ret | 19 | (France) Olivier Jacque | Yamaha | 16 | Accident | 2 | |
| Ret | 18 | (Malaysia) Shahrol Yuzy | Yamaha | 11 | Accident | 19 | |
| Ret | 42 | (Spain) David Checa | TSR-Honda | 7 | Retirement | 11 | |
| Ret | 68 | (Brazil) Cristiano Vieira | Honda | 5 | Retirement | 29 | |
| Ret | 77 | (United Kingdom) Jamie Robinson | Aprilia | 4 | Retirement | 22 | |
| Ret | 67 | (Brazil) César Barros | Honda | 1 | Accident | 28 | |
| Ret | 16 | (Sweden) Johan Stigefelt | TSR-Honda | 0 | Retirement | 26 | |
| Ret | 30 | (Spain) Alex Debón | Aprilia | 0 | Accident | 8 | |
| DNS | 66 | (Germany) Alex Hofmann | Aprilia | | Did not start | | |

== 125 cc classification ==
| Pos. | No. | Rider | Manufacturer | Laps | Time/Retired | Grid | Points |
|---|---|---|---|---|---|---|---|
| 1 | 16 | (Italy) Simone Sanna | Aprilia | 21 | 42:14.265 | 3 | 25 |
| 2 | 3 | (Japan) Masao Azuma | Honda | 21 | +0.034 | 9 | 20 |
| 3 | 41 | (Japan) Youichi Ui | Derbi | 21 | +5.680 | 2 | 16 |
| 4 | 8 | (Italy) Gianluigi Scalvini | Aprilia | 21 | +14.597 | 6 | 13 |
| 5 | 9 | (Italy) Lucio Cecchinello | Honda | 21 | +14.890 | 14 | 11 |
| 6 | 5 | (Japan) Noboru Ueda | Honda | 21 | +15.056 | 10 | 10 |
| 7 | 23 | (Italy) Gino Borsoi | Aprilia | 21 | +16.677 | 7 | 9 |
| 8 | 1 | (Spain) Emilio Alzamora | Honda | 21 | +17.033 | 15 | 8 |
| 9 | 12 | (France) Randy de Puniet | Aprilia | 21 | +17.566 | 11 | 7 |
| 10 | 22 | (Spain) Pablo Nieto | Derbi | 21 | +18.043 | 13 | 6 |
| 11 | 15 | (San Marino) Alex de Angelis | Honda | 21 | +20.526 | 8 | 5 |
| 12 | 26 | (Italy) Ivan Goi | Honda | 21 | +20.695 | 20 | 4 |
| 13 | 17 | (Germany) Steve Jenkner | Honda | 21 | +26.309 | 16 | 3 |
| 14 | 18 | (Spain) Antonio Elías | Honda | 21 | +50.820 | 22 | 2 |
| 15 | 34 | (Andorra) Eric Bataille | Honda | 21 | +1:04.998 | 21 | 1 |
| 16 | 51 | (Italy) Marco Petrini | Aprilia | 21 | +1:05.290 | 17 | |
| 17 | 11 | (Italy) Max Sabbatani | Honda | 21 | +1:05.753 | 18 | |
| 18 | 35 | (Germany) Reinhard Stolz | Honda | 21 | +1:27.528 | 24 | |
| Ret | 32 | (Italy) Mirko Giansanti | Honda | 20 | Retirement | 4 | |
| Ret | 21 | (France) Arnaud Vincent | Aprilia | 16 | Retirement | 12 | |
| Ret | 24 | (United Kingdom) Leon Haslam | Italjet | 15 | Retirement | 23 | |
| Ret | 39 | (Czech Republic) Jaroslav Huleš | Italjet | 11 | Retirement | 19 | |
| Ret | 4 | (Italy) Roberto Locatelli | Aprilia | 7 | Retirement | 1 | |
| Ret | 54 | (San Marino) Manuel Poggiali | Derbi | 6 | Retirement | 5 | |
| DNS | 29 | (Spain) Ángel Nieto Jr. | Honda | | Did not start | | |
| DNS | 53 | (San Marino) William de Angelis | Aprilia | | Did not start | | |
| DNQ | 90 | (Brazil) Leandro Panadés | Honda | | Did not qualify | | |
| DNQ | 89 | (Brazil) Renato Velludo | Honda | | Did not qualify | | |
| DNQ | 52 | (Brazil) Gian Calabrezzi | Honda | | Did not qualify | | |
| DNQ | 87 | (Brazil) Wesley Gutierrez | Honda | | Did not qualify | | |

== Championship standings after the race (500cc) ==
Below are the standings for the top five riders and constructors after round fourteen has concluded.

Riders' Championship standings

| Pos. | Rider | Points |
|---|---|---|
| 1 | (United States) Kenny Roberts Jr. | 224 |
| 2 | (Italy) Valentino Rossi | 173 |
| 3 | (Australia) Garry McCoy | 150 |
| 4 | (Spain) Carlos Checa | 142 |
| 5 | (Brazil) Alex Barros | 141 |

Constructors' Championship standings

| Pos. | Constructor | Points |
|---|---|---|
| 1 | (Japan) Yamaha | 277 |
| 2 | (Japan) Honda | 271 |
| 3 | (Japan) Suzuki | 230 |
| 4 | (Italy) Aprilia | 83 |
| 5 | (Japan) TSR-Honda | 80 |

- Note: Only the top five positions are included for both sets of standings.

| Previous race: 2000 Valencian Grand Prix | FIM Grand Prix World Championship; 2000 season | Next race: 2000 Pacific Grand Prix |
| Previous race: 1999 Rio de Janeiro Grand Prix | Rio de Janeiro Grand Prix | Next race: 2001 Rio de Janeiro Grand Prix |
