= Max Sabbatani =

Italian motorcycle racer

- Nationality: Italian
Motorcycle racing career statistics
Grand Prix motorcycle racing
Active years	1996 – 2004
First race	1996 125cc City of Imola Grand Prix
Last race	2004 250cc German Grand Prix
Team(s)	Honda, Aprilia, Yamaha
Championships	0
Starts / Wins / Podiums / Poles / F. laps / Points; 84 / 0 / 0 / 1 / 2 / 129

Massimiliano Sabbatani (born 4 August 1975 in Forlì, Italy) is a former Grand Prix motorcycle road racer. He was 125 cc European Champion in 1998.

== Career statistics ==
=== Grand Prix motorcycle racing ===
==== Races by year ====
(key) (Races in bold indicate pole position, races in italics indicate fastest lap)

Year	Class	Bike	1	2	3	4	5	6	7	8	9	10	11	12	13	14	15	16	Pos.	Pts
1998	125cc	Honda	JPN	MAL	SPA	ITA	FRA	MAD	NED	GBR	GER	CZE	IMO; 17	CAT	AUS	ARG			NC	0
1999	125cc	Honda	MAL; 11	JPN; 7	SPA; Ret	FRA; Ret	ITA; 16	CAT; Ret	NED	GBR; 18	GER; Ret	CZE; 20	IMO; 21	VAL; Ret	AUS; Ret	RSA; 16	BRA; 14	ARG; 11	19th	21
2000	125cc	Honda	RSA; 20	MAL; 13	JPN; 19	SPA; Ret	FRA; Ret	ITA; 20	CAT; 7	NED; 15	GBR; 16	GER; Ret	CZE; Ret	POR; 13	VAL; 26	BRA; 17	PAC; 18	AUS; Ret	22nd	16
2001	125cc	Aprilia	JPN; 12	RSA; 7	SPA; 8	FRA; 15	ITA; Ret	CAT; 21	NED; 15	GBR; 15	**GER**; 7	CZE; 5	POR; 9	VAL; 9	PAC; Ret	AUS; 8	MAL; 10	BRA; Ret	13th	72
2002	125cc	Aprilia	JPN; Ret	RSA; 7	SPA; 8	FRA; 15	ITA; DNS	CAT	NED	GBR; Ret	GER; 22	CZE; 15	POR; Ret	BRA	PAC; 19	MAL; Ret	AUS; 17	VAL; 11	25th	17
2003	125cc	Aprilia	JPN; 13	RSA; Ret	SPA; 24	FRA; 18	ITA; 23	CAT; 21	NED; 22	GBR; Ret	GER; DNS	CZE; Ret	POR; 21	BRA; Ret	PAC; Ret	MAL; Ret	AUS; Ret	VAL; 16	30th	3
2004	250cc	Yamaha	RSA; 24	SPA; Ret	FRA; DNQ	ITA; Ret	CAT; DNS	NED; DNQ	BRA; Ret	GER; Ret	GBR; DNS	CZE	POR	JPN					NC	0
2004	125cc	Honda													QAT; Ret	MAL; Ret	AUS; 25	VAL; Ret	NC	0
