= 2000 Portuguese motorcycle Grand Prix =

(Portugal) 2000 Portuguese Grand Prix
Race details
- Race 12 of 16 races in the 2000 Grand Prix motorcycle racing season
- Date: 3 September 2000
- Official name: Grande Prémio Marlboro de Portugal
- Location: Autódromo do Estoril
- Course: Permanent racing facility; 4.182 km (2.599 mi)

500cc
Pole position
- Rider: (Australia) Garry McCoy
- Time: 1:40.736
Fastest lap
- Rider: (Italy) Valentino Rossi
- Time: 1:42.200 on lap 28
Podium
- First: (Australia) Garry McCoy
- Second: (United States) Kenny Roberts Jr.
- Third: (Italy) Valentino Rossi

250cc
Pole position
- Rider: (France) Olivier Jacque
- Time: 1:42.506
Fastest lap
- Rider: (France) Olivier Jacque
- Time: 1:42.985 on lap 3
Podium
- First: (Japan) Daijiro Kato
- Second: (France) Olivier Jacque
- Third: (Italy) Marco Melandri

125cc
Pole position
- Rider: (Japan) Youichi Ui
- Time: 1:47.080
Fastest lap
- Rider: (Italy) Roberto Locatelli
- Time: 1:47.279 on lap 9
Podium
- First: (Spain) Emilio Alzamora
- Second: (Italy) Roberto Locatelli
- Third: (France) Arnaud Vincent

The 2000 Portuguese motorcycle Grand Prix was the twelfth round of the 2000 Grand Prix motorcycle racing season. It took place on 3 September 2000 at Estoril.

This was the first Portuguese motorcycle Grand Prix since 1987. It was previously a one-off race held in Spain.

== 500 cc classification ==
Pos.	No.	Rider	Team	Manufacturer	Laps	Time	Grid	Points
1	24	(Australia) Garry McCoy	Red Bull Yamaha WCM	Yamaha	28	48:07.663	1	25
2	2	(United States) Kenny Roberts Jr.	Telefónica Movistar Suzuki	Suzuki	28	+4.941	4	20
3	46	(Italy) Valentino Rossi	Nastro Azzurro Honda	Honda	28	+5.182	12	16
4	4	(Italy) Max Biaggi	Marlboro Yamaha Team	Yamaha	28	+5.724	5	13
5	55	(France) Régis Laconi	Red Bull Yamaha WCM	Yamaha	28	+13.759	10	11
6	1	(Spain) Àlex Crivillé	Repsol YPF Honda Team	Honda	28	+15.422	9	10
7	8	(Japan) Tadayuki Okada	Repsol YPF Honda Team	Honda	28	+15.425	6	9
8	17	(Netherlands) Jurgen van den Goorbergh	Rizla Honda	TSR-Honda	28	+15.776	3	8
9	6	(Japan) Norick Abe	Antena 3 Yamaha d'Antin	Yamaha	28	+19.623	13	7
10	10	(Brazil) Alex Barros	Emerson Honda Pons	Honda	28	+19.843	7	6
11	99	(United Kingdom) Jeremy McWilliams	Blu Aprilia Team	Aprilia	28	+32.421	15	5
12	7	(Spain) Carlos Checa	Marlboro Yamaha Team	Yamaha	28	+33.195	8	4
13	65	(Italy) Loris Capirossi	Emerson Honda Pons	Honda	28	+54.916	14	3
14	31	(Japan) Tetsuya Harada	Blu Aprilia Team	Aprilia	28	+1:13.562	17	2
15	68	(Australia) Mark Willis	Proton Team KR	Modenas KR3	28	+1:18.311	16	1
16	25	(Spain) José Luis Cardoso	Maxon Dee Cee Jeans	Honda	28	+1:19.532	18	
17	15	(Japan) Yoshiteru Konishi	FCC TSR	TSR-Honda	28	+1:47.140	19	
18	18	(Belgium) Sébastien Le Grelle	Tecmas Honda Elf	Honda	27	+1 lap	20	
19	20	(United Kingdom) Phil Giles	Sabre Sport	Honda	27	+1 lap	21	
Ret	5	(Spain) Sete Gibernau	Repsol YPF Honda Team	Honda	20	Accident	11	
Ret	43	(Italy) Paolo Tessari	Team Paton	Paton	10	Retirement	22	
Ret	9	(Japan) Nobuatsu Aoki	Telefónica Movistar Suzuki	Suzuki	0	Accident	2	

== 250 cc classification ==
Pos.	No.	Rider	Manufacturer	Laps	Time/Retired	Grid	Points
1	74	(Japan) Daijiro Kato	Honda	26	45:07.769	2	25
2	19	(France) Olivier Jacque	Yamaha	26	+10.954	1	20
3	35	(Italy) Marco Melandri	Aprilia	26	+28.317	6	16
4	14	(Australia) Anthony West	Honda	26	+34.314	12	13
5	26	(Germany) Klaus Nöhles	Aprilia	26	+35.983	8	11
6	10	(Spain) Fonsi Nieto	Yamaha	26	+40.091	11	10
7	24	(United Kingdom) Jason Vincent	Aprilia	26	+40.375	14	9
8	11	(Italy) Ivan Clementi	Aprilia	26	+51.493	19	8
9	22	(France) Sébastien Gimbert	TSR-Honda	26	+54.322	18	7
10	18	(Malaysia) Shahrol Yuzy	Yamaha	26	+54.506	26	6
11	66	(Germany) Alex Hofmann	Aprilia	26	+58.840	25	5
12	21	(Italy) Franco Battaini	Aprilia	26	+59.337	13	4
13	25	(France) Vincent Philippe	TSR-Honda	26	+1:00.132	16	3
14	37	(Italy) Luca Boscoscuro	Aprilia	26	+1:05.509	24	2
15	77	(United Kingdom) Jamie Robinson	Aprilia	26	+1:24.133	27	1
16	23	(France) Julien Allemand	Yamaha	26	+1:24.462	23	
17	31	(Spain) Lucas Oliver	Yamaha	26	+1:35.079	20	
18	85	(Portugal) Felisberto Teixeira	Yamaha	25	+1 lap	29	
19	38	(Spain) Álvaro Molina	TSR-Honda	25	+1 lap	28	
Ret	20	(Spain) Jerónimo Vidal	Aprilia	20	Retirement	21	
Ret	15	(United Kingdom) Adrian Coates	Aprilia	12	Retirement	22	
Ret	41	(Netherlands) Jarno Janssen	TSR-Honda	9	Retirement	17	
Ret	4	(Japan) Tohru Ukawa	Honda	3	Accident	4	
Ret	56	(Japan) Shinya Nakano	Yamaha	3	Accident	3	
Ret	8	(Japan) Naoki Matsudo	Yamaha	3	Accident	15	
Ret	6	(Germany) Ralf Waldmann	Aprilia	2	Accident	5	
Ret	9	(Argentina) Sebastián Porto	Yamaha	1	Accident	10	
Ret	42	(Spain) David Checa	TSR-Honda	1	Accident	7	
Ret	30	(Spain) Alex Debón	Aprilia	1	Accident	9	
DNS	16	(Sweden) Johan Stigefelt	TSR-Honda		Did not start		
DNQ	86	(Spain) Vicente Esparragoso	Yamaha		Did not qualify		
DNQ	87	(Spain) Pablo Antelo	Honda		Did not qualify		

== 125 cc classification ==
Pos.	No.	Rider	Manufacturer	Laps	Time/Retired	Grid	Points
1	1	(Spain) Emilio Alzamora	Honda	24	43:22.891	2	25
2	4	(Italy) Roberto Locatelli	Aprilia	24	+3.691	3	20
3	21	(France) Arnaud Vincent	Aprilia	24	+12.233	8	16
4	9	(Italy) Lucio Cecchinello	Honda	24	+12.804	17	13
5	16	(Italy) Simone Sanna	Aprilia	24	+16.958	14	11
6	26	(Italy) Ivan Goi	Honda	24	+19.629	15	10
7	12	(France) Randy de Puniet	Aprilia	24	+26.990	9	9
8	23	(Italy) Gino Borsoi	Aprilia	24	+30.785	10	8
9	29	(Spain) Ángel Nieto Jr.	Honda	24	+30.794	13	7
10	39	(Czech Republic) Jaroslav Huleš	Italjet	24	+33.054	23	6
11	17	(Germany) Steve Jenkner	Honda	24	+33.466	20	5
12	22	(Spain) Pablo Nieto	Derbi	24	+49.454	19	4
13	11	(Italy) Max Sabbatani	Honda	24	+1:04.046	22	3
14	10	(Spain) Adrián Araujo	Honda	24	+1:13.056	27	2
15	53	(San Marino) William de Angelis	Aprilia	24	+1:13.060	21	1
16	34	(Andorra) Eric Bataille	Honda	24	+1:14.132	26	
17	18	(Spain) Antonio Elías	Honda	23	+1 lap	16	
18	84	(Portugal) José Leite	Honda	23	+1 lap	28	
Ret	3	(Japan) Masao Azuma	Honda	23	Accident	11	
Ret	54	(San Marino) Manuel Poggiali	Derbi	17	Retirement	4	
Ret	24	(United Kingdom) Leon Haslam	Italjet	17	Retirement	25	
Ret	15	(San Marino) Alex de Angelis	Honda	12	Accident	5	
Ret	32	(Italy) Mirko Giansanti	Honda	10	Accident	6	
Ret	51	(Italy) Marco Petrini	Aprilia	10	Retirement	24	
Ret	41	(Japan) Youichi Ui	Derbi	9	Accident	1	
Ret	8	(Italy) Gianluigi Scalvini	Aprilia	9	Accident	12	
Ret	35	(Germany) Reinhard Stolz	Honda	9	Accident	18	
Ret	5	(Japan) Noboru Ueda	Honda	8	Accident	7	
DNQ	86	(Portugal) Paulo Henriques	Aprilia		Did not qualify		
DNQ	83	(Portugal) Emmanuel Carvalho	Honda		Did not qualify		
DNQ	85	(Portugal) Manuel Vieira	Yamaha		Did not qualify		

== Championship standings after the race (500cc) ==
Below are the standings for the top five riders and constructors after round twelve has concluded.

Riders' Championship standings

Pos.	Rider	Points
1	(United States) Kenny Roberts Jr.	194
2	(Italy) Valentino Rossi	148
3	(Spain) Carlos Checa	132
4	(Italy) Loris Capirossi	126
5	(Japan) Norifumi Abe	113

Constructors' Championship standings

Pos.	Constructor	Points
1	(Japan) Yamaha	236
2	(Japan) Honda	235
3	(Japan) Suzuki	200
4	(Italy) Aprilia	80
5	(Japan) TSR-Honda	68

- Note: Only the top five positions are included for both sets of standings.

Previous race: 2000 Czech Republic Grand Prix	FIM Grand Prix World Championship; 2000 season	Next race: 2000 Valencian Grand Prix
Previous race: 1987 Portuguese Grand Prix	Portuguese Grand Prix	Next race: 2001 Portuguese Grand Prix
