= 2000 Valencian Community motorcycle Grand Prix =

2000 Valencian Community Grand Prix
Race details
- Race 13 of 16 races in the 2000 Grand Prix motorcycle racing season
- Date: 17 September 2000
- Official name: Gran Premio Marlboro de la Comunitat Valenciana
- Location: Valencia
- Course: Permanent racing facility; 4.005 km (2.489 mi)

500cc
Pole position
- Rider: (United States) Kenny Roberts Jr.
- Time: 1:35.133
Fastest lap
- Rider: (Spain) Àlex Crivillé
- Time: 1:36.085 on lap 4
Podium
- First: (Australia) Garry McCoy
- Second: (United States) Kenny Roberts Jr.
- Third: (Italy) Max Biaggi

250cc
Pole position
- Rider: (France) Olivier Jacque
- Time: 1:36.680
Fastest lap
- Rider: (Japan) Shinya Nakano
- Time: 1:36.398 on lap 16
Podium
- First: (Japan) Shinya Nakano
- Second: (France) Olivier Jacque
- Third: (Italy) Marco Melandri

125cc
Pole position
- Rider: (Italy) Roberto Locatelli
- Time: 1:40.918
Fastest lap
- Rider: (Japan) Youichi Ui
- Time: 1:40.631 on lap 8
Podium
- First: (Italy) Roberto Locatelli
- Second: (Japan) Masao Azuma
- Third: (Japan) Youichi Ui

The 2000 Valencian Community motorcycle Grand Prix was the thirteenth round of the 2000 Grand Prix motorcycle racing season. It took place on 17 September 2000 at the Circuit de Valencia.

== 500 cc classification ==
Pos.	No.	Rider	Team	Manufacturer	Laps	Time/Retired	Grid	Points
1	24	(Australia) Garry McCoy	Red Bull Yamaha WCM	Yamaha	30	48:27.799	4	25
2	2	(United States) Kenny Roberts Jr.	Telefónica Movistar Suzuki	Suzuki	30	+5.005	1	20
3	4	(Italy) Max Biaggi	Marlboro Yamaha Team	Yamaha	30	+5.978	2	16
4	9	(Japan) Nobuatsu Aoki	Telefónica Movistar Suzuki	Suzuki	30	+8.675	12	13
5	10	(Brazil) Alex Barros	Emerson Honda Pons	Honda	30	+14.247	7	11
6	55	(France) Régis Laconi	Red Bull Yamaha WCM	Yamaha	30	+16.111	10	10
7	7	(Spain) Carlos Checa	Marlboro Yamaha Team	Yamaha	30	+19.967	6	9
8	5	(Spain) Sete Gibernau	Repsol YPF Honda Team	Honda	30	+21.094	9	8
9	8	(Japan) Tadayuki Okada	Repsol YPF Honda Team	Honda	30	+21.346	14	7
10	17	(Netherlands) Jurgen van den Goorbergh	Rizla Honda	TSR-Honda	30	+37.506	8	6
11	11	(Spain) José David de Gea	Proton Team KR	Modenas KR3	30	+37.682	15	5
12	25	(Spain) José Luis Cardoso	Maxon Dee Cee Jeans	Honda	30	+59.465	18	4
13	33	(Spain) David Tomás	Queroseno Racing Team	Honda	29	+1 lap	19	3
14	15	(Japan) Yoshiteru Konishi	FCC TSR	TSR-Honda	29	+1 lap	20	2
15	20	(United Kingdom) Phil Giles	Sabre Sport	Honda	29	+1 lap	22	1
Ret	46	(Italy) Valentino Rossi	Nastro Azzurro Honda	Honda	26	Accident	5	
Ret	43	(Italy) Paolo Tessari	Team Paton	Paton	15	Retirement	23	
Ret	1	(Spain) Àlex Crivillé	Repsol YPF Honda Team	Honda	12	Retirement	11	
Ret	65	(Italy) Loris Capirossi	Emerson Honda Pons	Honda	10	Accident	3	
Ret	99	(United Kingdom) Jeremy McWilliams	Blu Aprilia Team	Aprilia	6	Accident	13	
Ret	6	(Japan) Norick Abe	Antena 3 Yamaha d'Antin	Yamaha	3	Accident	16	
Ret	18	(Belgium) Sébastien Le Grelle	Tecmas Honda Elf	Honda	3	Retirement	21	
Ret	31	(Japan) Tetsuya Harada	Blu Aprilia Team	Aprilia	1	Retirement	17	

== 250 cc classification ==
Pos.	No.	Rider	Manufacturer	Laps	Time/Retired	Grid	Points
1	56	(Japan) Shinya Nakano	Yamaha	27	43:49.140	2	25
2	19	(France) Olivier Jacque	Yamaha	27	+4.285	1	20
3	35	(Italy) Marco Melandri	Aprilia	27	+14.848	3	16
4	4	(Japan) Tohru Ukawa	Honda	27	+14.897	4	13
5	74	(Japan) Daijiro Kato	Honda	27	+20.208	13	11
6	21	(Italy) Franco Battaini	Aprilia	27	+36.491	5	10
7	14	(Australia) Anthony West	Honda	27	+39.810	14	9
8	9	(Argentina) Sebastián Porto	Yamaha	27	+39.887	12	8
9	24	(United Kingdom) Jason Vincent	Aprilia	27	+40.271	19	7
10	42	(Spain) David Checa	TSR-Honda	27	+40.273	8	6
11	30	(Spain) Alex Debón	Aprilia	27	+53.509	7	5
12	37	(Italy) Luca Boscoscuro	Aprilia	27	+56.619	9	4
13	6	(Germany) Ralf Waldmann	Aprilia	27	+56.709	6	3
14	18	(Malaysia) Shahrol Yuzy	Yamaha	27	+1:01.788	11	2
15	8	(Japan) Naoki Matsudo	Yamaha	27	+1:04.067	18	1
16	25	(France) Vincent Philippe	TSR-Honda	27	+1:17.605	20	
17	10	(Spain) Fonsi Nieto	Yamaha	27	+1:18.349	10	
18	66	(Germany) Alex Hofmann	Aprilia	27	+1:20.839	24	
19	77	(United Kingdom) Jamie Robinson	Aprilia	27	+1:22.270	17	
20	23	(France) Julien Allemand	Yamaha	27	+1:28.758	22	
21	11	(Italy) Ivan Clementi	Aprilia	27	+1:30.004	23	
22	31	(Spain) Lucas Oliver	Yamaha	27	+1:34.529	28	
23	15	(United Kingdom) Adrian Coates	Aprilia	26	+1 lap	21	
24	41	(Netherlands) Jarno Janssen	TSR-Honda	26	+1 lap	25	
Ret	26	(Germany) Klaus Nöhles	Aprilia	20	Retirement	15	
Ret	39	(Spain) Ismael Bonilla	Honda	19	Retirement	29	
Ret	38	(Spain) Álvaro Molina	TSR-Honda	14	Retirement	30	
Ret	16	(Sweden) Johan Stigefelt	TSR-Honda	9	Retirement	26	
Ret	22	(France) Sébastien Gimbert	TSR-Honda	2	Retirement	27	
Ret	20	(Spain) Jerónimo Vidal	Aprilia	0	Retirement	16	

== 125 cc classification ==
Pos.	No.	Rider	Manufacturer	Laps	Time/Retired	Grid	Points
1	4	(Italy) Roberto Locatelli	Aprilia	25	42:27.505	1	25
2	3	(Japan) Masao Azuma	Honda	25	+0.433	6	20
3	41	(Japan) Youichi Ui	Derbi	25	+7.925	2	16
4	22	(Spain) Pablo Nieto	Derbi	25	+7.941	4	13
5	1	(Spain) Emilio Alzamora	Honda	25	+15.086	3	11
6	16	(Italy) Simone Sanna	Aprilia	25	+20.463	17	10
7	8	(Italy) Gianluigi Scalvini	Aprilia	25	+20.625	19	9
8	9	(Italy) Lucio Cecchinello	Honda	25	+21.015	8	8
9	23	(Italy) Gino Borsoi	Aprilia	25	+21.456	11	7
10	21	(France) Arnaud Vincent	Aprilia	25	+21.688	10	6
11	5	(Japan) Noboru Ueda	Honda	25	+21.848	9	5
12	15	(San Marino) Alex de Angelis	Honda	25	+25.453	5	4
13	32	(Italy) Mirko Giansanti	Honda	25	+27.102	12	3
14	54	(San Marino) Manuel Poggiali	Derbi	25	+32.153	18	2
15	18	(Spain) Antonio Elías	Honda	25	+36.034	15	1
16	17	(Germany) Steve Jenkner	Honda	25	+44.666	20	
17	29	(Spain) Ángel Nieto Jr.	Honda	25	+47.817	7	
18	12	(France) Randy de Puniet	Aprilia	25	+47.862	13	
19	44	(Spain) Héctor Faubel	Aprilia	25	+1:10.477	26	
20	51	(Italy) Marco Petrini	Aprilia	25	+1:12.524	24	
21	39	(Czech Republic) Jaroslav Huleš	Italjet	25	+1:12.684	23	
22	24	(United Kingdom) Leon Haslam	Italjet	25	+1:17.512	25	
23	35	(Germany) Reinhard Stolz	Honda	25	+1:26.832	28	
24	43	(Spain) David Micó	Aprilia	25	+1:27.526	21	
25	53	(San Marino) William de Angelis	Aprilia	25	+1:30.158	29	
26	11	(Italy) Max Sabbatani	Honda	24	+1 lap	16	
Ret	47	(Spain) Ángel Rodríguez	Aprilia	21	Retirement	27	
Ret	34	(Andorra) Eric Bataille	Honda	13	Accident	22	
Ret	26	(Italy) Ivan Goi	Honda	13	Accident	14	
Ret	10	(Spain) Adrián Araujo	Honda	0	Retirement	30	

== Championship standings after the race (500cc) ==
Below are the standings for the top five riders and constructors after round thirteen has concluded.

Riders' Championship standings

Pos.	Rider	Points
1	(United States) Kenny Roberts Jr.	214
2	(Italy) Valentino Rossi	148
3	(Spain) Carlos Checa	141
4	(Australia) Garry McCoy	134
5	(Italy) Loris Capirossi	126

Constructors' Championship standings

Pos.	Constructor	Points
1	(Japan) Yamaha	261
2	(Japan) Honda	246
3	(Japan) Suzuki	220
4	(Italy) Aprilia	80
5	(Japan) TSR-Honda	74

- Note: Only the top five positions are included for both sets of standings.

Previous race: 2000 Portuguese Grand Prix	FIM Grand Prix World Championship; 2000 season	Next race: 2000 Rio de Janeiro Grand Prix
Previous race: 1999 Valencian Grand Prix	Valencian Grand Prix	Next race: 2001 Valencian Grand Prix
