= 2000 South African motorcycle Grand Prix =

(South Africa) 2000 South African Grand Prix
Race details
- Race 1 of 16 races in the 2000 Grand Prix motorcycle racing season
- Date: 19 March 2000
- Official name: Gauloises Africa's Grand Prix
- Location: Phakisa Freeway, Welkom
- Course: Permanent racing facility; 4.242 km (2.636 mi)

500cc
Pole position
- Rider: (Spain) Sete Gibernau
- Time: 1:36.273
Fastest lap
- Rider: (Italy) Valentino Rossi
- Time: 1:36.933 on lap 5
Podium
- First: (Australia) Garry McCoy
- Second: (Spain) Carlos Checa
- Third: (Italy) Loris Capirossi

250cc
Pole position
- Rider: (Japan) Shinya Nakano
- Time: 1:37.705
Fastest lap
- Rider: (Japan) Daijiro Kato
- Time: 1:37.440 on lap 15
Podium
- First: (Japan) Shinya Nakano
- Second: (Japan) Daijiro Kato
- Third: (Japan) Tohru Ukawa

125cc
Pole position
- Rider: (Italy) Roberto Locatelli
- Time: 1:43.464
Fastest lap
- Rider: (France) Arnaud Vincent
- Time: 1:42.782 on lap 22
Podium
- First: (France) Arnaud Vincent
- Second: (Italy) Mirko Giansanti
- Third: (Spain) Emilio Alzamora

The 2000 South African motorcycle Grand Prix was the first round of the 2000 Grand Prix motorcycle racing season. It took place on 19 March 2000 at Phakisa Freeway.

== 500cc race report ==
This race was most notable for the shock win of WCM rider Garry McCoy. Initially, many thought that it would be 1999 500cc world champion Àlex Crivillé who would win the race, mainly thanks to the pole he had obtained on Saturday. This race also marked the first ever 500cc race of Valentino Rossi.

At the start of the race, Kenny Roberts Jr. on his Suzuki, overtook Gibernau at the start to lead the opening lap, followed by the Yamaha of Carlos Checa. Crivillé would drop down to 7th, whilst Tadayuki Okada moved up to third, closely followed by Loris Capirossi who would swap places with each other a few times on the opening lap. McCoy at that time was only in 8th place, and Rossi in 13th after a bad opening lap.

After a few laps, Checa would overtake Kenny Roberts Jr. for the lead, and not long after that Capirossi would follow suit. McCoy dropped to 9th place, with Valentino Rossi behind him.

On the 5th lap, Capirossi overtook Checa to lead the race, and after 12 laps, both Max Biaggi and Valentino Rossi were out of the race; Biaggi because of technical problems, and Rossi because of a crash.

With the laps closing down, McCoy overtook multiple people to reach third place. Sete Gibernau also overtook Kenny Roberts to go on and finish in what would be 4th place, but ran wide and eventually retired. Not much later, Crivillé would end up overtaking Roberts Jr. as well.

With 5 laps to go, McCoy overtook the Honda of Capirossi and went up into second place. A few corners later, he overtook the other Yamaha of Checa to lead the race. He held off a late charge from Checa and would come home to win the race with 0.366 seconds difference: the first 500cc race of his career.

This was the first race to be won by an Australian since the 1998 Argentine motorcycle Grand Prix who was won by Mick Doohan.

== 500 cc classification ==
Pos.	No.	Rider	Team	Manufacturer	Laps	Time/Retired	Grid	Points
1	24	(Australia) Garry McCoy	Red Bull Yamaha WCM	Yamaha	28	45:38.775	9	25
2	7	(Spain) Carlos Checa	Marlboro Yamaha Team	Yamaha	28	+0.366	4	20
3	65	(Italy) Loris Capirossi	Emerson Honda Pons	Honda	28	+1.590	2	16
4	10	(Brazil) Alex Barros	Emerson Honda Pons	Honda	28	+9.745	13	13
5	1	(Spain) Àlex Crivillé	Repsol Honda Team	Honda	28	+10.253	7	11
6	2	(United States) Kenny Roberts Jr.	Telefónica Movistar Suzuki	Suzuki	28	+15.853	3	10
7	6	(Japan) Norick Abe	Antena 3 Yamaha d'Antin	Yamaha	28	+24.228	15	9
8	9	(Japan) Nobuatsu Aoki	Telefónica Movistar Suzuki	Suzuki	28	+26.719	12	8
9	55	(France) Régis Laconi	Red Bull Yamaha WCM	Yamaha	28	+36.231	16	7
10	17	(Netherlands) Jurgen van den Goorbergh	Rizla Honda	TSR-Honda	28	+37.613	11	6
11	25	(Spain) José Luis Cardoso	Maxon Dee Cee Jeans	Honda	28	+1:04.044	20	5
12	22	(France) Sébastien Gimbert	Tecmas Honda Elf	Honda	28	+1:14.912	17	4
13	15	(Japan) Yoshiteru Konishi	F.C.C. TSR	TSR-Honda	28	+1:30.049	21	3
14	12	(South Africa) Shane Norval	Sabre Sport	Honda	28	+1:32.776	19	2
15	11	(Spain) José David de Gea	Proton Team KR	Modenas KR3	27	+1 lap	18	1
Ret	8	(Japan) Tadayuki Okada	Repsol Honda Team	Honda	21	Accident	6	
Ret	5	(Spain) Sete Gibernau	Repsol Honda Team	Honda	20	Retirement	1	
Ret	46	(Italy) Valentino Rossi	Nastro Azzurro Honda	Honda	12	Accident	5	
Ret	4	(Italy) Max Biaggi	Marlboro Yamaha Team	Yamaha	12	Retirement	10	
Ret	99	(United Kingdom) Jeremy McWilliams	Aprilia Grand Prix Racing	Aprilia	7	Retirement	8	
Ret	31	(Japan) Tetsuya Harada	Aprilia Grand Prix Racing	Aprilia	2	Retirement	14	

== 250 cc classification ==
Pos.	No.	Rider	Manufacturer	Laps	Time/Retired	Grid	Points
1	56	(Japan) Shinya Nakano	Yamaha	26	42:34.085	1	25
2	74	(Japan) Daijiro Kato	Honda	26	+0.875	3	20
3	4	(Japan) Tohru Ukawa	Honda	26	+13.813	2	16
4	19	(France) Olivier Jacque	Yamaha	26	+30.687	5	13
5	14	(Australia) Anthony West	Honda	26	+47.621	4	11
6	21	(Italy) Franco Battaini	Aprilia	26	+47.705	6	10
7	6	(Germany) Ralf Waldmann	Aprilia	26	+58.221	7	9
8	9	(Argentina) Sebastián Porto	Yamaha	26	+1:02.190	11	8
9	24	(United Kingdom) Jason Vincent	Aprilia	26	+1:07.732	17	7
10	8	(Japan) Naoki Matsudo	Yamaha	26	+1:09.269	18	6
11	77	(United Kingdom) Jamie Robinson	Aprilia	26	+1:23.219	14	5
12	30	(Spain) Alex Debón	Aprilia	26	+1:25.538	10	4
13	13	(Italy) Marco Melandri	Aprilia	26	+1:29.763	8	3
14	26	(Germany) Klaus Nöhles	Aprilia	26	+1:31.878	13	2
15	44	(Italy) Roberto Rolfo	TSR-Honda	25	+1 lap	28	1
16	42	(Spain) David Checa	TSR-Honda	25	+1 lap	24	
17	41	(Netherlands) Jarno Janssen	TSR-Honda	25	+1 lap	19	
18	12	(Germany) Mike Baldinger	Yamaha	25	+1 lap	26	
Ret	10	(Spain) Fonsi Nieto	Yamaha	21	Retirement	23	
Ret	31	(Spain) Lucas Oliver	Yamaha	20	Retirement	27	
Ret	18	(Malaysia) Shahrol Yuzy	Yamaha	19	Retirement	12	
Ret	16	(Sweden) Johan Stigefelt	TSR-Honda	17	Retirement	20	
Ret	11	(Italy) Ivan Clementi	Aprilia	14	Retirement	22	
Ret	54	(Spain) David García	Aprilia	12	Accident	21	
Ret	37	(Italy) Luca Boscoscuro	Aprilia	10	Retirement	9	
Ret	66	(Germany) Alex Hofmann	Aprilia	8	Retirement	15	
Ret	15	(United Kingdom) Adrian Coates	Aprilia	3	Accident	16	
DNS	25	(France) Vincent Philippe	TSR-Honda	0	Did not start	25	

== 125 cc classification ==
Pos.	No.	Rider	Manufacturer	Laps	Time/Retired	Grid	Points
1	21	(France) Arnaud Vincent	Aprilia	24	41:35.310	6	25
2	32	(Italy) Mirko Giansanti	Honda	24	+1.937	4	20
3	1	(Spain) Emilio Alzamora	Honda	24	+2.057	11	16
4	4	(Italy) Roberto Locatelli	Aprilia	24	+2.362	1	13
5	5	(Japan) Noboru Ueda	Honda	24	+4.566	7	11
6	17	(Germany) Steve Jenkner	Honda	24	+11.073	5	10
7	8	(Italy) Gianluigi Scalvini	Aprilia	24	+11.187	3	9
8	26	(Italy) Ivan Goi	Honda	24	+11.504	8	8
9	3	(Japan) Masao Azuma	Honda	24	+37.723	12	7
10	23	(Italy) Gino Borsoi	Aprilia	24	+39.819	9	6
11	9	(Italy) Lucio Cecchinello	Honda	24	+39.887	18	5
12	16	(Italy) Simone Sanna	Aprilia	24	+39.964	10	4
13	29	(Spain) Ángel Nieto Jr.	Honda	24	+40.474	14	3
14	12	(France) Randy de Puniet	Aprilia	24	+41.118	13	2
15	22	(Spain) Pablo Nieto	Derbi	24	+52.411	16	1
16	15	(San Marino) Alex de Angelis	Honda	24	+52.639	15	
17	35	(Germany) Reinhard Stolz	Honda	24	+1:22.243	20	
18	10	(Spain) Adrián Araujo	Honda	24	+1:27.527	24	
19	53	(San Marino) William de Angelis	Aprilia	24	+1:27.811	21	
20	11	(Italy) Max Sabbatani	Honda	24	+1:28.093	17	
21	51	(Italy) Marco Petrini	Aprilia	24	+1:28.449	19	
22	24	(United Kingdom) Leon Haslam	Italjet	24	+1:28.648	22	
23	18	(Spain) Antonio Elías	Honda	24	+1:47.350	23	
Ret	39	(Czech Republic) Jaroslav Huleš	Italjet	4	Retirement	25	
Ret	41	(Japan) Youichi Ui	Derbi	0	Accident	2	
DNS	54	(San Marino) Manuel Poggiali	Derbi		Did not start		

== Championship standings after the race (500cc) ==
Below are the standings for the top five riders and constructors after round one has concluded.

Riders' Championship standings

Pos.	Rider	Points
1	(Australia) Garry McCoy	25
2	(Spain) Carlos Checa	20
3	(Italy) Loris Capirossi	16
4	(Brazil) Alex Barros	13
5	(Spain) Àlex Crivillé	11

Constructors' Championship standings

Pos.	Constructor	Points
1	(Japan) Yamaha	25
2	(Japan) Honda	16
3	(Japan) Suzuki	10
4	(Japan) TSR-Honda	6
5	(Malaysia) Modenas KR3	1

- Note: Only the top five positions are included for both sets of standings.

Previous race: 1999 Argentine Grand Prix	FIM Grand Prix World Championship; 2000 season	Next race: 2000 Malaysian Grand Prix
Previous race: 1999 South African Grand Prix	South African Grand Prix	Next race: 2001 South African Grand Prix
