= Garry McCoy =

Australian motorcycle racer

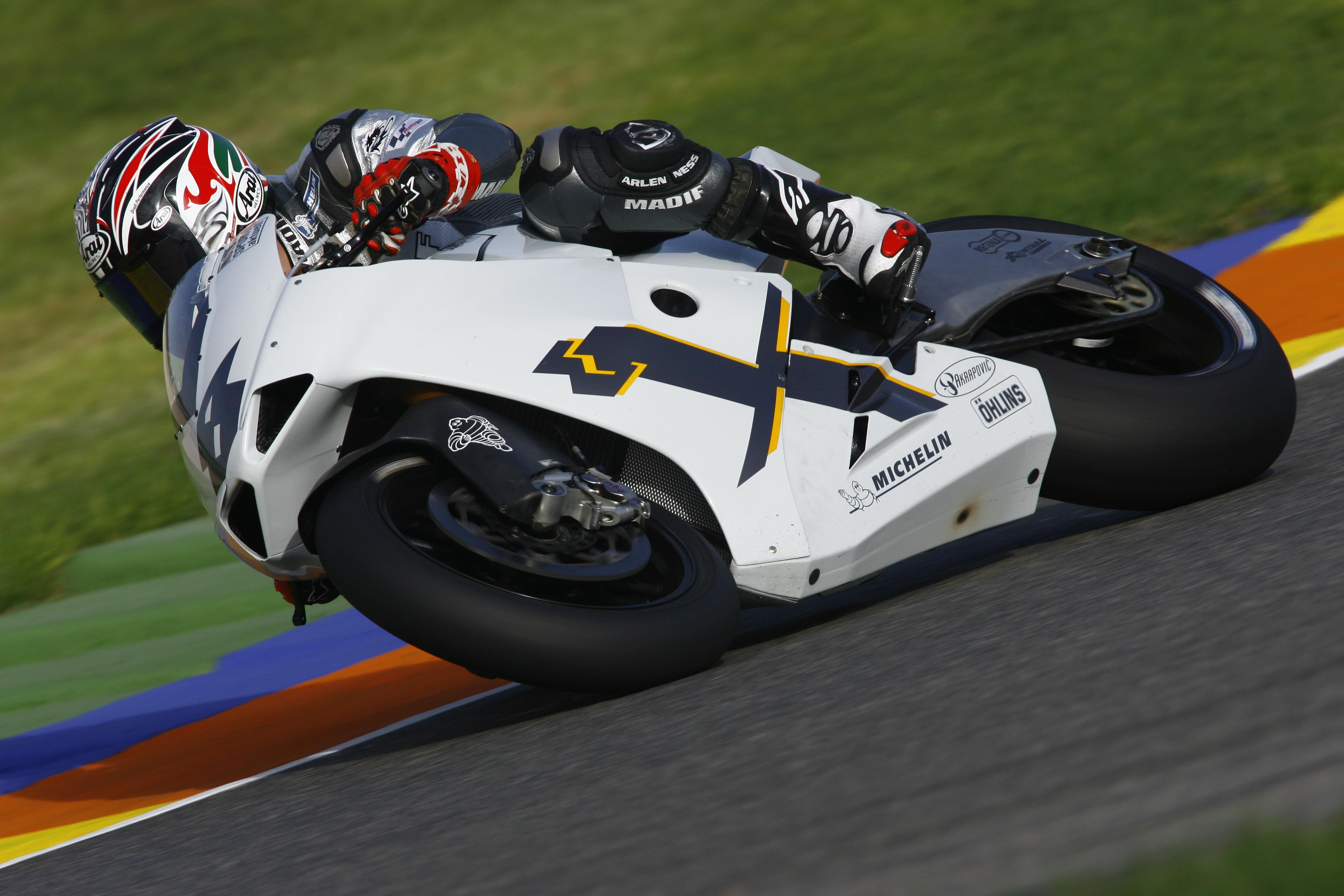
- McCoy on the Ilmor X3 in 2006
- Nationality: Australian
- Born: 18 April 1972 (age 54); Sydney, New South Wales, Australia
- Bike number: 18, 24, 5, 8
- Website: garrymccoy.tv
Motorcycle racing career statistics
MotoGP World Championship
Active years	1998–2006
Manufacturers	Honda, Yamaha, Aprilia, Kawasaki, Ilmor
Championships	0
2006 championship position	22nd (2 pts)
Starts / Wins / Podiums / Poles / F. laps / Points; 83 / 3 / 10 / 1 / 5 / 383

Garry McCoy (born 18 April 1972 in Sydney) is an Australian former professional motorcycle racer. He has won races in the 125cc and 500cc World Championships, as well as in the Superbike World Championship. He is noted for his oversteering style of riding, earning him the nickname "the Slide King".

== Career ==
McCoy was born in Sydney and in his late teens was a motorcycle speedway rider in his home state of New South Wales, racing alongside such riders as Todd Wiltshire and Craig Boyce. McCoy mostly rode in Division 2 races at tracks like the now closed Newcastle Motordrome. He finished second in the NSW Div 2 championship in November 1990.

McCoy raced in his first 125 cc world championship races in 1992, only four months after his first road race of any kind. He entered the full season the year after, though he missed races through injury in both 1993 and 1994. He won the 1995 Malaysian Grand Prix and the Australian Grand Prix as well as seven other top-three finishes and one pole position. In 1996, he signed to privateer Team Bramich and rode a 748s Ducati. It was a great year for McCoy as he learnt from team director, Don Bramich, the fundamentals for managing a successful team.

In 1998, McCoy joined the Hardwick Racing Shell Advance Honda team to compete in the premier 500 cc class for the first time, riding a NSR500. He scored points in six of the nine races he started before a broken ankle ended his season. He was out of a ride at the start of 1999, and considered returning to cabinet-making, but he joined WCM mid-season, and finished third at Valencia Grand Prix, though his best result elsewhere was seventh.

2000 was a breakout season for McCoy with WCM, as he opened the year with a shock win at the South African Grand Prix at Welkom. He had been the only rider to get the 16'5-inch Michelin tyre working to full effect, with his sideways riding style and slight build ideally suited to it. There were two further wins that year at Portugal and Valencia (his Valencia victory was the most recent win for a non-Honda satellite bike until Fabio Quartararo's victory at Jerez in 2020) to help secure a fifth-place finish in the 500 championship. 2001 was ruined by a broken wrist sustained at the French Grand Prix, and 2002 was not a huge success either, resulting in him joining Kawasaki's factory team. This was hugely disappointing; McCoy only scored points three times, and he and teammates Andrew Pitt and Alex Hofmann rarely qualified in the top 15.

For 2004, McCoy joined NCR Ducati in the Superbike World Championship, winning at Philip Island and finishing sixth overall. He raced for Carl Fogarty's Foggy Petronas team in 2005, as the team attempted to make its 900 cc 3 cylinder bike competitive. After nine rounds, his best finish was 12th, and he has qualified for Superpole and a top-16 starting spot four times. Results did not improve, and he had no road racing ride for 2006, instead contesting some Supercross.

McCoy worked as a test rider for Ilmor's 2007 Ilmor X3 800 cc MotoGP prototype, competing in the final two rounds of the 2006 MotoGP season as a wildcard. He was expected to ride for Ilmor in 2007, but Andrew Pitt and an injured, 42-year-old Jeremy McWilliams were chosen instead.

In 2008, McCoy joined Triumph's new Supersport World Championship campaign on the Daytona 675 bike. He failed to finish the first race in Losail due to a mechanical failure. He finished sixth in the Philip Island race and retired from the Valencia race. A huge crash at Brno when he struck the slowing bike of one-time teammate Andrew Pitt threatened to end his season

In 2009, at the Donington circuit, McCoy scored the first podium for Triumph with third place. He was back on the podium with another third at the WSS final round for 2009 in Portimao, Portugal, finishing the season eighth overall.

Initial expectations were that McCoy would continue with the team for the 2010 season, however he was not a part of the four-rider lineup. The team stated that he had left by 'mutual consent', however McCoy denied this and claimed that the departure was news to him

In 2010, McCoy was set to make his return to MotoGP with the FB Corse Team with a two-year deal that would have marked his 18 years in competition. However, the team failed to get its three-cylinder 800cc project into competitive shape, and on 7 June 2010, McCoy announced their contract had been terminated by mutual consent.

== Career statistics ==
=== Grand Prix motorcycle racing ===
All stats according to MotoGP.com

==== By season ====
Season	Class	Motorcycle	Team	Race	Win	Podium	Pole	FLap	Pts	Plcd
1992	125cc	Honda RS125		3	0	0	0	0	0	NC
1993	125cc	Honda RS125		12	0	0	0	0	25	19th
1994	125cc	Aprilia RS125		10	0	2	0	0	56	13th
1995	125cc	Honda RS125		4	1	1	0	0	16	13th
1996	125cc	Aprilia RS125		15	1	2	0	0	87	12th
1997	125cc	Aprilia RS125		15	0	2	1	0	109	7th
1998	500cc	Honda NSR500	Shell Advance Racing	10	0	0	0	0	23	17th
1999	500cc	Yamaha YZR500	Red Bull Yamaha WCM	10	0	1	0	0	65	14th
2000	500cc	Yamaha YZR500	Red Bull Yamaha WCM	16	3	6	1	1	161	5th
2001	500cc	Yamaha YZR500	Red Bull Yamaha WCM	11	0	3	0	0	88	12th
2002	MotoGP	Yamaha YZR500	Red Bull Yamaha WCM	12	0	0	0	0	33	20th
2003	MotoGP	Kawasaki Ninja ZX-RR	Kawasaki Racing Team	16	0	0	0	0	11	22nd
2004	MotoGP	Aprilia RS Cube	MS Aprilia Racing	3	0	0	0	0	0	NC
2006	MotoGP	Ilmor X3	Ilmor SRT	2	0	0	0	0	2	22nd
Total				**139**	**5**	**17**	**2**	**1**	**676**	

==== Races by year ====
(key) (Races in bold indicate pole position; races in italics indicate fastest lap)

Year	Class	Bike	1	2	3	4	5	6	7	8	9	10	11	12	13	14	15	16	17	Pos	Pts
1992	125cc	Honda	JPN	AUS; Ret	MAL; Ret	ESP	ITA	EUR	GER	NED; Ret	HUN	FRA	GBR	BRA	RSA					NC	0
1993	125cc	Honda	AUS; 10	MAL; Ret	JPN; Ret	ESP	AUT	GER; 22	NED; 16	EUR; Ret	RSM; 16	GBR; 14	CZE; 14	ITA; 16	USA; 7	FIM; 10				19th	25
1994	125cc	Aprilia	AUS; 3	MAL; 12	JPN; 9	ESP; 11	AUT; 3	GER; DNS	NED; 8	ITA; Ret	FRA; 17	GBR; Ret	CZE; 16	USA	ARG	EUR				13th	156
1995	125cc	Honda	AUS; Ret	MAL; 1	JPN; Ret	ESP; 14	GER	ITA	NED	FRA	GBR	CZE	BRA	ARG	EUR					22nd	16
1996	125cc	Aprilia	MAL; 12	INA; Ret	JPN; Ret	ESP; Ret	ITA; 20	FRA; 9	NED; 18	GER; Ret	GBR; 14	AUT; Ret	CZE; 11	IMO; 4	CAT; 2	BRA; 5	AUS; 1			12th	87
1997	125cc	Aprilia	MAL; Ret	JPN; 7	ESP; Ret	ITA; 3	AUT; 4	**FRA**; 3	NED; Ret	IMO; 4	GER; Ret	BRA; 13	GBR; 4	CZE; 11	CAT; 9	INA; 9	AUS; 9			7th	109
1998	500cc	Honda	JPN; Ret	MAL; 10	ESP; 15	ITA; 13	FRA; 17	MAD; 11	NED; 11	GBR; 13	GER; Ret	CZE	IMO	CAT	AUS; Ret	ARG				17th	23
1999	500cc	Yamaha	MAL	JPN	ESP	FRA	ITA	CAT	NED; 15	GBR; Ret	GER; 11	CZE; 8	IMO; 9	VAL; 3	AUS; 7	RSA; 8	BRA; 8	ARG; 13		14th	65
2000	500cc	Yamaha	RSA; 1	MAL; 3	JPN; 9	ESP; Ret	FRA; 4	ITA; Ret	CAT; 16	NED; 15	GBR; 17	GER; 10	CZE; 3	**POR**; 1	VAL; 1	BRA; 3	PAC; Ret	AUS; 5		5th	161
2001	500cc	Yamaha	JPN; 2	RSA; Ret	SPA; 9	FRA; DNS	ITA	CAT; DNS	NED; DNS	GBR	GER; 11	CZE; 6	POR; 3	VAL; 12	PAC; 12	AUS; Ret	MAL; 3	BRA; 10		12th	88
2002	MotoGP	Yamaha	JPN; Ret	RSA; 10	SPA; 15	FRA	ITA	CAT	NED	GBR; 12	GER; 9	CZE; 13	POR; 11	BRA; 10	PAC; 17	MAL; 15	AUS; 18	VAL; Ret		20th	33
2003	MotoGP	Kawasaki	JPN; 16	RSA; 17	SPA; 18	FRA; 9	ITA; 15	CAT; 17	NED; 18	GBR; 16	GER; 16	CZE; 18	POR; Ret	BRA; Ret	PAC; Ret	MAL; 19	AUS; 13	VAL; 19		22nd	11
2004	MotoGP	Aprilia	RSA	SPA	FRA	ITA	CAT	NED	BRA	GER	GBR	CZE	POR	JPN	QAT	MAL; 16	AUS; Ret	VAL; 16		NC	0
2006	MotoGP	Ilmor X3	SPA	QAT	TUR	CHN	FRA	ITA	CAT	NED	GBR	GER	USA	CZE	MAL	AUS	JPN	POR; 15	VAL; 15	22nd	2

=== Superbike World Championship ===
==== Races by year ====
(key) (Races in bold indicate pole position) (Races in italics indicate fastest lap)

Year	Bike	1		2		3		4		5		6		7		8		9		10		11		12		13		14		Pos	Pts
Year	Bike	R1	R2	R1	R2	R1	R2	R1	R2	R1	R2	R1	R2	R1	R2	R1	R2	R1	R2	R1	R2	R1	R2	R1	R2	R1	R2	R1	R2	Pos	Pts
2004	Ducati	SPA; 7	SPA; 6	AUS; 5	AUS; 1	SMR; Ret	SMR; 17	ITA; 3	ITA; 3	GER; 9	GER; 4	GBR; 4	GBR; 8	USA; 7	USA; 7	GBR; Ret	GBR; 7	NED; 8	NED; Ret	ITA; 5	ITA; 5	FRA; 9	FRA; 9							6th	199
2005	Petronas	QAT; 17	QAT; 16	AUS; Ret	AUS; Ret	SPA; Ret	SPA; Ret	ITA; Ret	ITA; 21	EUR; Ret	EUR; 13	SMR; Ret	SMR; Ret	CZE; Ret	CZE; DNS	GBR; 18	GBR; Ret	NED; 13	NED; 12	GER; 11	GER; Ret	ITA; DNS	ITA; C	FRA	FRA					22nd	15

=== Supersport World Championship ===
==== Races by year ====
(key) (Races in bold indicate pole position; races in italics indicate fastest lap)

Year	Bike	1	2	3	4	5	6	7	8	9	10	11	12	13	14	Pos	Pts
2008	Triumph	QAT; Ret	AUS; 6	ESP; Ret	NED; Ret	ITA; Ret	GER	SMR; Ret	CZE; DNS	GBR	EUR	ITA	FRA	POR; 13		26th	13
2009	Triumph	AUS; 14	QAT; 7	SPA; Ret	NED; 15	ITA; 8	RSA; 7	USA; 6	SMR; Ret	GBR; 3	CZE; 8	GER; 8	ITA; 5	FRA; Ret	POR; 3	8th	98
