= 1999 Valencian Community motorcycle Grand Prix =

1999 Valencian Community Grand Prix
Race details
- Race 12 of 16 races in the 1999 Grand Prix motorcycle racing season
- Date: 19 September 1999
- Official name: Gran Premio Movistar de la Comunitat Valenciana
- Location: Circuit Ricardo Tormo
- Course: Permanent racing facility; 4.005 km (2.489 mi)

500cc
Pole position
- Rider: (France) Régis Laconi
- Time: 1:36.132
Fastest lap
- Rider: (United States) Kenny Roberts Jr.
- Time: 1:42.473 on lap 30
Podium
- First: (France) Régis Laconi
- Second: (United States) Kenny Roberts Jr.
- Third: (Australia) Garry McCoy

250cc
Pole position
- Rider: (Japan) Shinya Nakano
- Time: 1:37.258
Fastest lap
- Rider: (Italy) Franco Battaini
- Time: 1:47.987 on lap 24
Podium
- First: (Japan) Tohru Ukawa
- Second: (Italy) Franco Battaini
- Third: (Italy) Loris Capirossi

125cc
Pole position
- Rider: (France) Arnaud Vincent
- Time: 1:42.237
Fastest lap
- Rider: (Spain) Emilio Alzamora
- Time: 1:51.830 on lap 12
Podium
- First: (Italy) Gianluigi Scalvini
- Second: (Spain) Emilio Alzamora
- Third: (Japan) Noboru Ueda

The 1999 Valencian Community motorcycle Grand Prix was the twelfth round of the 1999 Grand Prix motorcycle racing season. It took place on 19 September 1999 at the Circuit de Valencia. This race saw the last French Rider to win a race in the premier class until Fabio Quartararo at the 2020 Spanish Grand Prix almost 21 years later.

== 500 cc classification ==
| Pos. | No. | Rider | Team | Manufacturer | Laps | Time/Retired | Grid | Points |
|---|---|---|---|---|---|---|---|---|
| 1 | 55 | (France) Régis Laconi | Red Bull Yamaha WCM | Yamaha | 30 | 53:23.825 | 1 | 25 |
| 2 | 10 | (United States) Kenny Roberts Jr. | Suzuki Grand Prix Team | Suzuki | 30 | +3.548 | 9 | 20 |
| 3 | 24 | (Australia) Garry McCoy | Red Bull Yamaha WCM | Yamaha | 30 | +4.609 | 8 | 16 |
| 4 | 8 | (Japan) Tadayuki Okada | Repsol Honda Team | Honda | 30 | +6.155 | 4 | 13 |
| 5 | 4 | (Spain) Carlos Checa | Marlboro Yamaha Team | Yamaha | 30 | +22.031 | 5 | 11 |
| 6 | 6 | (Japan) Norick Abe | Antena 3 Yamaha d'Antin | Yamaha | 30 | +22.144 | 6 | 10 |
| 7 | 2 | (Italy) Max Biaggi | Marlboro Yamaha Team | Yamaha | 30 | +36.985 | 2 | 9 |
| 8 | 19 | (United States) John Kocinski | Kanemoto Nettaxi Honda | Honda | 30 | +37.198 | 7 | 8 |
| 9 | 15 | (Spain) Sete Gibernau | Repsol Honda Team | Honda | 30 | +43.376 | 14 | 7 |
| 10 | 5 | (Brazil) Alex Barros | Movistar Honda Pons | Honda | 30 | +43.420 | 10 | 6 |
| 11 | 31 | (Japan) Tetsuya Harada | Aprilia Grand Prix Racing | Aprilia | 30 | +1:09.478 | 15 | 5 |
| 12 | 9 | (Japan) Nobuatsu Aoki | Suzuki Grand Prix Team | Suzuki | 30 | +1:12.741 | 11 | 4 |
| 13 | 22 | (France) Sébastien Gimbert | Tecmas Honda Elf | Honda | 30 | +1:26.833 | 20 | 3 |
| 14 | 52 | (Spain) José David de Gea | Proton KR Modenas | Modenas KR3 | 30 | +1:43.106 | 18 | 2 |
| 15 | 20 | (United States) Mike Hale | Proton KR Modenas | Modenas KR3 | 29 | +1 lap | 17 | 1 |
| 16 | 21 | (United Kingdom) Michael Rutter | Millar Honda | Honda | 29 | +1 lap | 21 | |
| 17 | 32 | (France) Marc Garcia | Dee Cee Jeans Racing Team | Honda | 28 | +2 laps | 22 | |
| Ret | 3 | (Spain) Àlex Crivillé | Repsol Honda Team | Honda | 25 | Accident | 3 | |
| Ret | 25 | (Spain) José Luis Cardoso | Team Maxon TSR | TSR-Honda | 23 | Retirement | 19 | |
| Ret | 14 | (Spain) Juan Borja | Movistar Honda Pons | Honda | 22 | Accident | 12 | |
| Ret | 17 | (Netherlands) Jurgen van den Goorbergh | Team Biland GP1 | MuZ Weber | 21 | Retirement | 13 | |
| Ret | 68 | (Australia) Mark Willis | Buckley Systems BSL Racing | Modenas KR3 | 6 | Accident | 16 | |
| DNQ | 27 | (France) Bernard Garcia | Team Biland GP1 | MuZ Weber | | Did not qualify | | |
| WD | 26 | (Japan) Haruchika Aoki | FCC TSR | TSR-Honda | | Withdrew | | |

== 250 cc classification ==
| Pos. | No. | Rider | Manufacturer | Laps | Time/Retired | Grid | Points |
|---|---|---|---|---|---|---|---|
| 1 | 4 | (Japan) Tohru Ukawa | Honda | 27 | 49:50.449 | 5 | 25 |
| 2 | 21 | (Italy) Franco Battaini | Aprilia | 27 | +5.125 | 9 | 20 |
| 3 | 1 | (Italy) Loris Capirossi | Honda | 27 | +10.224 | 2 | 16 |
| 4 | 56 | (Japan) Shinya Nakano | Yamaha | 27 | +14.848 | 1 | 13 |
| 5 | 7 | (Italy) Stefano Perugini | Honda | 27 | +34.042 | 12 | 11 |
| 6 | 12 | (Argentina) Sebastián Porto | Yamaha | 27 | +37.495 | 10 | 10 |
| 7 | 24 | (United Kingdom) Jason Vincent | Honda | 27 | +44.911 | 13 | 9 |
| 8 | 46 | (Italy) Valentino Rossi | Aprilia | 27 | +1:01.011 | 4 | 8 |
| 9 | 14 | (Australia) Anthony West | TSR-Honda | 27 | +1:10.352 | 15 | 7 |
| 10 | 66 | (Germany) Alex Hofmann | TSR-Honda | 27 | +1:18.683 | 17 | 6 |
| 11 | 37 | (Italy) Luca Boscoscuro | TSR-Honda | 27 | +1:20.847 | 8 | 5 |
| 12 | 22 | (Spain) Lucas Oliver Bultó | Yamaha | 27 | +1:23.051 | 19 | 4 |
| 13 | 44 | (Italy) Roberto Rolfo | Aprilia | 27 | +1:24.329 | 11 | 3 |
| 14 | 36 | (Japan) Masaki Tokudome | TSR-Honda | 27 | +1:26.837 | 22 | 2 |
| 15 | 10 | (Spain) Fonsi Nieto | Yamaha | 27 | +1:45.669 | 30 | 1 |
| 16 | 15 | (Spain) David García | Yamaha | 27 | +1:48.927 | 25 | |
| 17 | 18 | (United Kingdom) Scott Smart | Aprilia | 27 | +1:49.731 | 20 | |
| 18 | 60 | (Spain) Alex Debón | Honda | 26 | +1 lap | 29 | |
| 19 | 41 | (Netherlands) Jarno Janssen | TSR-Honda | 26 | +1 lap | 21 | |
| Ret | 58 | (Argentina) Matías Ríos | Aprilia | 24 | Retirement | 24 | |
| Ret | 9 | (United Kingdom) Jeremy McWilliams | Aprilia | 22 | Retirement | 7 | |
| Ret | 17 | (Netherlands) Maurice Bolwerk | TSR-Honda | 21 | Retirement | 18 | |
| Ret | 19 | (France) Olivier Jacque | Yamaha | 20 | Retirement | 3 | |
| Ret | 57 | (Spain) Ismael Bonilla | Honda | 20 | Retirement | 27 | |
| Ret | 23 | (France) Julien Allemand | TSR-Honda | 17 | Retirement | 16 | |
| Ret | 62 | (Spain) Álvaro Molina | Honda | 15 | Retirement | 31 | |
| Ret | 6 | (Germany) Ralf Waldmann | Aprilia | 14 | Retirement | 6 | |
| Ret | 91 | (Spain) David Ortega | TSR-Honda | 9 | Retirement | 26 | |
| Ret | 16 | (Sweden) Johan Stigefelt | Yamaha | 6 | Retirement | 28 | |
| Ret | 11 | (Japan) Tomomi Manako | Yamaha | 6 | Retirement | 14 | |
| Ret | 69 | (Spain) Daniel Ribalta | Yamaha | 0 | Retirement | 23 | |

== 125 cc classification ==
| Pos. | No. | Rider | Manufacturer | Laps | Time/Retired | Grid | Points |
|---|---|---|---|---|---|---|---|
| 1 | 8 | (Italy) Gianluigi Scalvini | Aprilia | 25 | 47:36.994 | 8 | 25 |
| 2 | 7 | (Spain) Emilio Alzamora | Honda | 25 | +7.957 | 7 | 20 |
| 3 | 6 | (Japan) Noboru Ueda | Honda | 25 | +28.360 | 12 | 16 |
| 4 | 21 | (France) Arnaud Vincent | Aprilia | 25 | +32.455 | 1 | 13 |
| 5 | 17 | (Germany) Steve Jenkner | Aprilia | 25 | +39.038 | 11 | 11 |
| 6 | 23 | (Italy) Gino Borsoi | Aprilia | 25 | +1:09.267 | 13 | 10 |
| 7 | 16 | (Italy) Simone Sanna | Honda | 25 | +1:34.477 | 9 | 9 |
| 8 | 15 | (Italy) Roberto Locatelli | Aprilia | 25 | +1:35.606 | 10 | 8 |
| 9 | 85 | (Spain) David Micó | Aprilia | 25 | +1:35.921 | 29 | 7 |
| 10 | 12 | (France) Randy de Puniet | Aprilia | 25 | +1:39.107 | 25 | 6 |
| 11 | 44 | (Italy) Alessandro Brannetti | Aprilia | 25 | +1:39.479 | 20 | 5 |
| 12 | 1 | (Japan) Kazuto Sakata | Honda | 25 | +1:50.845 | 22 | 4 |
| 13 | 18 | (Germany) Reinhard Stolz | Honda | 24 | +1 lap | 26 | 3 |
| 14 | 55 | (Spain) Antonio Elías | Honda | 24 | +1 lap | 27 | 2 |
| 15 | 29 | (Spain) Ángel Nieto, Jr. | Honda | 24 | +1 lap | 19 | 1 |
| 16 | 20 | (Germany) Bernhard Absmeier | Aprilia | 24 | +1 lap | 28 | |
| 17 | 53 | (Spain) Emilio Delgado | Honda | 24 | +1 lap | 30 | |
| Ret | 54 | (San Marino) Manuel Poggiali | Aprilia | 21 | Retirement | 18 | |
| Ret | 10 | (Spain) Jerónimo Vidal | Aprilia | 20 | Retirement | 15 | |
| Ret | 86 | (Spain) Iván Martínez | Aprilia | 13 | Accident | 23 | |
| Ret | 4 | (Japan) Masao Azuma | Honda | 12 | Accident | 4 | |
| Ret | 13 | (Italy) Marco Melandri | Honda | 12 | Accident | 2 | |
| Ret | 11 | (Italy) Max Sabbatani | Honda | 11 | Accident | 24 | |
| Ret | 9 | (France) Frédéric Petit | Aprilia | 11 | Accident | 21 | |
| Ret | 32 | (Italy) Mirko Giansanti | Aprilia | 11 | Retirement | 14 | |
| Ret | 22 | (Spain) Pablo Nieto | Derbi | 6 | Accident | 3 | |
| Ret | 26 | (Italy) Ivan Goi | Honda | 6 | Accident | 16 | |
| Ret | 5 | (Italy) Lucio Cecchinello | Honda | 6 | Accident | 5 | |
| Ret | 41 | (Japan) Youichi Ui | Derbi | 3 | Accident | 6 | |
| Ret | 56 | (Spain) Adrián Araujo | Honda | 3 | Retirement | 17 | |

== Championship standings after the race (500cc) ==
Below are the standings for the top five riders and constructors after round twelve has concluded.

Riders' Championship standings

| Pos. | Rider | Points |
|---|---|---|
| 1 | (Spain) Àlex Crivillé | 219 |
| 2 | (United States) Kenny Roberts Jr. | 173 |
| 3 | (Japan) Tadayuki Okada | 164 |
| 4 | (Spain) Sete Gibernau | 114 |
| 5 | (Italy) Max Biaggi | 109 |

Constructors' Championship standings

| Pos. | Constructor | Points |
|---|---|---|
| 1 | (Japan) Honda | 269 |
| 2 | (Japan) Yamaha | 190 |
| 3 | (Japan) Suzuki | 173 |
| 4 | (Italy) Aprilia | 94 |
| 5 | (Germany) MuZ Weber | 52 |

- Note: Only the top five positions are included for both sets of standings.

| Previous race: 1999 City of Imola Grand Prix | FIM Grand Prix World Championship; 1999 season | Next race: 1999 Australian Grand Prix |
| Previous race: None | Valencian Grand Prix | Next race: 2000 Valencian Grand Prix |
