= Modenas =

Malaysian national motorcycle company

- Type: Private Limited Company
- Industry: Motorcycles
- Founded: 1995
- Headquarters: Gurun, Kedah, Malaysia
- Website: www.modenas.my

Syarikat Motosikal dan Enjin Nasional Sdn. Bhd (National Motorcycle and Engine Company), or known as Modenas for short is a Malaysian national motorcycle company producing various small motorcycle models below 400cc targeted for local market and export. The company's headquarters and factory are located at the small town of Gurun, Kedah, Malaysia.

== History ==
The history of the company began at the early 1990s. After the success of Malaysian automotive manufacturer Proton, the government looked forward to launch a national motorcycle project. Modenas was formed in 1995 and majority of its shares were held by Kawasaki, Sojitz, Khazanah Nasional and DRB-HICOM.

The Gurun factory was launched by former Malaysian Prime Minister Mahathir Mohamad on 3 October 1996. Unlike Proton's factory at the time, much of the design, planning and production of the factory was done by Malaysians with technology from Japan.

Modenas achieved its 1,000,000th unit production in June 2007. Currently Modenas is exporting its products to 17 countries worldwide with Greece, Russia, Middle East and South America being the largest importer.

== Models ==
Generally, Modenas produces motorcycle models ranging below 250 cc. Most models are scooter models and Honda Super Cub compatible mopeds, or known by Malaysians as underbone (kapcai).

=== Kriss 110 ===
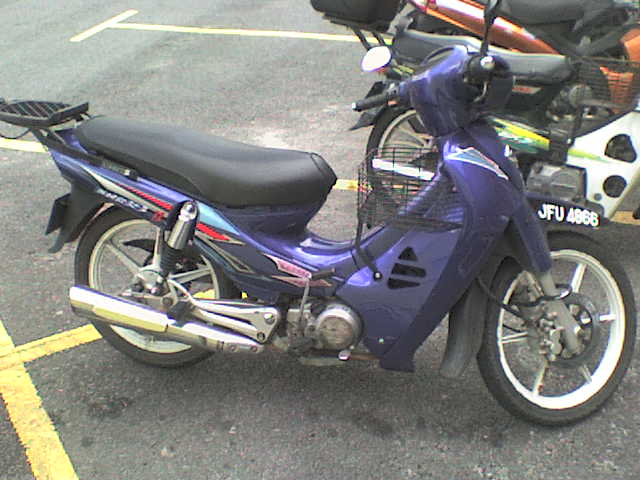
Modenas Kriss 2 with front disc brake

Modenas Kriss is the first model launched by Modenas in 1996. The model is actually named after a Malaysian traditional weapon, Keris, though some motorcycle shops in the United Kingdom had mistakenly advertised the model to be named from the acronym of a famous American motorcycle racer, Kenny Roberts because Modenas had once built some racing motorcycles for Modenas KR Motorcycle Grand Prix team.

It began production in August 1996 and was previewed to the public during Malaysian National Day parade in 1996. The original model only uses drum brakes, but in 1999 the front disc brake model was launched, known as Kriss 2 (or Kriss 115 Sports in some countries). Powered by 111 cc Kawasaki-developed engines, Modenas Kriss becomes the best-selling motorcycle model in Malaysia.

Another Kriss variant known as Kriss SG was launched in 2002. However, unlike other Kriss variants, this model did not sell very well due to its outdated design.

All Kriss series variants outcame major cosmetic changes in 2003 especially at the lights for newer, better looks.

In 2005, all Kriss 110 variants have been phased out to make way for production of Kristar, leaving only Kriss 100 as the sole variant of Kriss. However, Modenas decided to bring back the Kriss 110 into production in August 2006 due to extremely high demand from the customers, which is known as Kriss 110SE.

==== Kriss 110 SE ====
This is the Modenas Newest Kriss Motorcycle. Since Kriss is the most good selling motorcycle in Malaysia (rather than Kristar), Modenas decided to bring Kriss back and called them Kriss 110 SE (Second Edition).

==== Kriss 100 ====
After the success of Kriss variants to dominate 110 cc small motorcycle segment in Malaysian market, Modenas launched another Kriss variant, this time with a 97 cc engine developed by Modenas. This model uses the same chassis and components as its other Kriss 'brothers' except the engine. However, there is no disc brake option available for Kriss 100.

=== KR3 ===
1997 Modenas KR3 racing motorcycle

The Modenas KR3 was the first racing motorcycle ever produced by Modenas. It used a 500cc two-stroke engine with the unconventional V3 layout, the rules at the time allowing for a lighter bike than if it used a four-cylinder engine. The KR3 was built for the Team Roberts Grand Prix team (managed by Kenny Roberts) from 1997 to 2003. It was replaced by the Proton KR5 mid-season.

=== Jaguh 175 ===
In 1999, Modenas launched a small cruiser model based on the popular Kawasaki Eliminator series. This model is aimed for bikers who wish to own larger motorcycles that are based upon the style of American cruiser motorcycles but cannot afford to own them, due to very high duties on imported motorcycles placed by the government and the refusal of banks to finance loans on large motorcycles.

=== Karisma 125 ===
During these recent years, more and more scooter models were introduced in Malaysia. However, Kawasaki never produced any scooters, therefore Modenas had to source from a Taiwanese scooter company for the technology transfer.

The earliest production batches suffered poor handling, and after some improvements the handling of this model became better and Modenas Karisma dominates the Malaysian scooter market since 2004.

=== Elit Sport 150 ===
In August 2003, Modenas introduced three scooters, based on models produced by PGO Scooters of Taiwan.

Modenas Elit scooter, basically a rebadged PGO Scooters T-Rex was launched as an alternative to the Karisma model, in two displacement choices – 125 cc and the larger, more powerful 150 cc variant. Another PGO-based 150 cc model, the PGO G-Max 150(called as BLUR 150 in USA & BOBCAT 150 in Europe) was introduced as the "Modenas Elit Sports" in Malaysia, with a more aggressive engine tuning, alloy swing-arm and different more solid chassis/new era body design. The standard engine of Elit Sport 150 cc pick up and top speed can easily beat Standard Cup Motors such as Honda EX5 100, Honda Wave 125, Modenas Kriss 110, Modenas Kriss 120, Yamaha Lagenda 100 and 115, and Nouvo LC 135.

=== Ceria ===
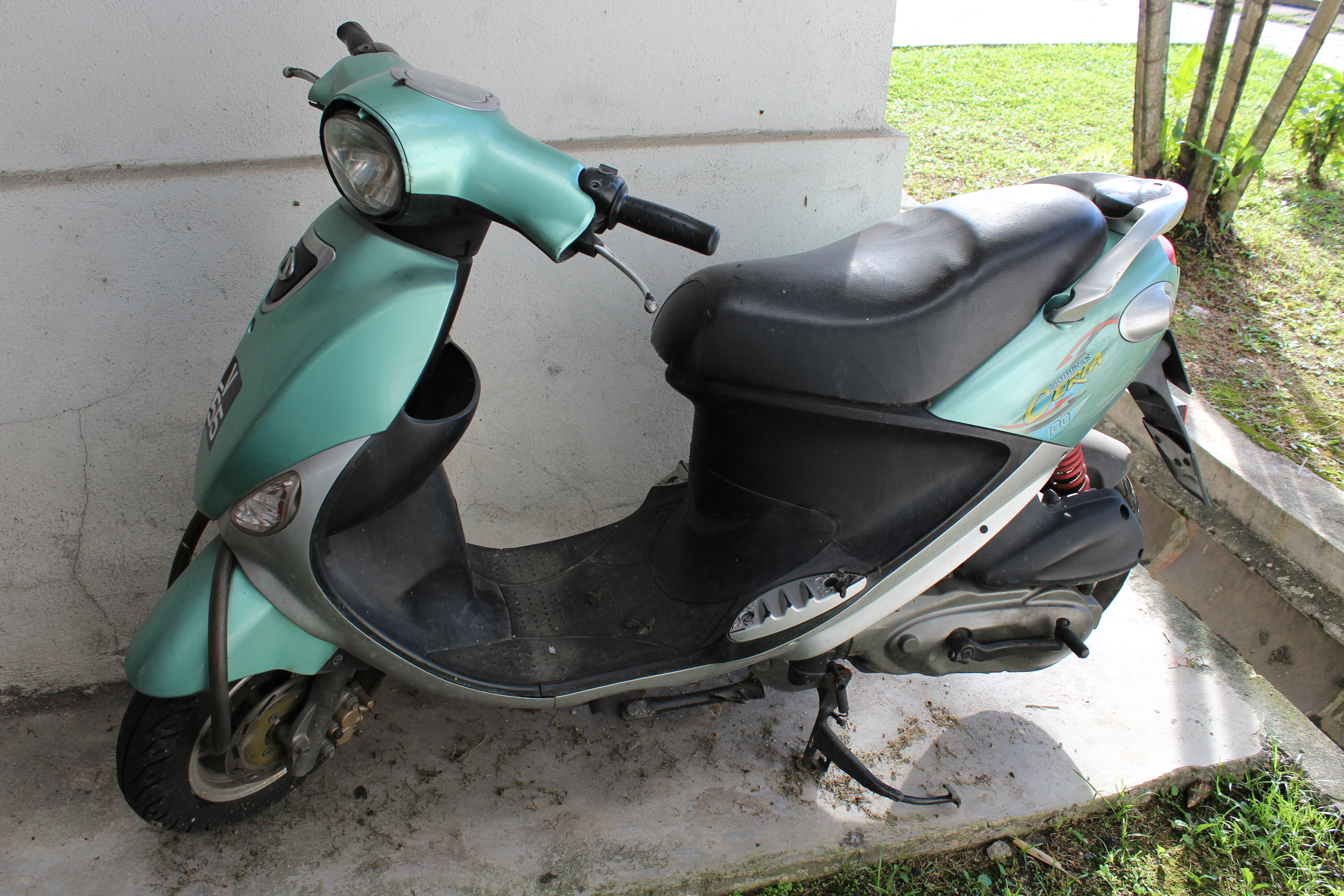
A Modenas Ceria scooter

Modenas Ceria scooter was launched together with the Elit model. Also based on a PGO (the BuBu 100), this more retro-styled scooter uses a smaller 101 cc engine, making Ceria the scooter with the smallest displacement ever produced by Modenas.

=== Dinamik ===
After years producing only 4-stroke powered motorcycles, Modenas launched its first 2-stroke motorcycle, based from the Kawasaki Leo Star and rebadged and named as the Dinamik. Dinamik together with Elit and Ceria scooters. It is also claimed by Modenas that this model exceeded Euro 2 emission standards without the addition of a catalytic converter.

This model was built by Modenas as a preparation to take part in Malaysian Cub Prix tournament which are currently dominated by Yamaha and Honda machines. During the tournament, Modenas increases the displacement up to 125, the original Kawasaki Leo Star which the Dinamik is based upon is originally only having a displacement of 118cc (hence named Leo Star 120) to provide more power and torque.

=== Elegan ===
At the end of February 2004, Modenas launched their first water-cooled scooter, Modenas Elegan. This model is targeted for those who wants to travel long distances. In addition to more powerful water-cooled engine, Elegan scooter features a large gasoline tank accessible under the handlebars, large underseat storage compartment, and digital meter panel for odometer, fuel gauge and thermometer. The engine cylinder is coated with Ni-Si ceramic for better reliability during long distance travels.

=== Kristar ===
Kristar was launched by Modenas at the end of 2004. Modenas decided to produce Kristar as their all-new model after nearly a decade of Modenas Kriss production.

Even though Kristar uses the same engine as Kriss, Modenas claimed that Kristar achieved better fuel economy of 46.95 km/L @ 90 km/h, compared with Kriss with the fuel economy of 44 km/L @ 90 km/h. The increase of fuel economy is due to the installation of the fuel tank breather tube connected to the inlet manifold for better fuel emission and better fuel economy.

Besides of the new design and better fuel economy, Kristar also features an underseat compartment that can be opened from the same ignition key slot, dual headlights, stylish superbike-like muffler and rear light failure detection system which claimed by Modenas as the only model equipped with this system.

=== Passion ===
Modenas Passion is the latest scooter model launched by Modenas in January 2006. Using a pair of 14-inch cast iron wheels, Modenas Passion has a direct competition with Yamaha Ego.

=== X-cite ===
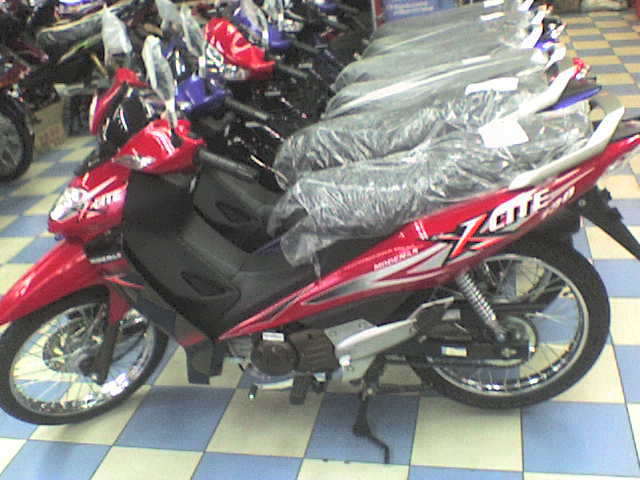
Modenas X-cite 130

Modenas X-cite is the latest motorcycle model launched by Modenas on 12 September 2006 as the largest Cub仔 (kapcai) model ever manufactured by Modenas to compete with the water-cooled Yamaha Y135LC.

The main features of the Modenas X-cite are as follows:-

- Fuel tank which is accessible at the front, just below the handlebars which can be opened via ignition key slot
- Large underseat storage compartment
- Tachometer
- Keihin constant-velocity carburetor with throttle position sensor
- Ignition slot cover for better protection against theft
- Molybdenum-coated piston

=== GT128 ===
The newer Modenas that was launched in March 2009. It is reintroduced as a redesigned chassis based on X-cite 130.

This model has become one of the Malaysian best seller Moped in 2009. GT 128 also has the highest spec in its class, nearing the 135 LC. Currently GT128 is the flagship model of Modenas market. Besides, GT 128 is known for low fuel consumption at economical speed compared to its competitors.

=== CT110 ===
The redowngraded of Modenas GT128 with the 110 cc engine. It uses the revolusioner GT128 chassis while the main power is came from 110 cc kriss 1 redesign engine. The Modenas CT is the replacement of Modenas Kriss 1 and 2.

Currently, Modenas has develop an E-Bike, known as CTric that use 100% of electricity to move it. With its zero emission when used, it was predicted to launch before the end of 2010.

=== CTric ===
A fully electric bike using the same chassis as CT110/100. It was launched on 17 June 2011 and also the first time MODENAS entering the electric vehicle segment.

This model is believed to be the first electric bike model using the underbone chassis which is most of the small electric bike is based on the scooter models.

=== ACE 115 ===
Modenas ACE 115 has launched their new model after the Modenas CT. The concept of this bike is scooter with moped which mean the bike have 2 characteristics. This bike also has new feature on it, there is a vertical monoshock like that on the Ducati Panigale.

=== CT 115s ===
The newest moped from Modenas since Ace 115. There are 2 colours available upon launching. Cherry Red & Cherry Blue.

=== Kriss MR2 ===
Launch at April 2017, upgrade version of Kriss MR1 with 110cc. Kriss MR2 has 4.5L tank capacity, front disk brake and more stylish design than its predecessors. Speculation said that Kriss MR2 are the rebadge of Zongshen ZS 110-26 motorcycle.

=== Modenas RS200/NS200 ===
Rebadge of Bajaj Auto Pulsar RS/NS 200.

=== Z15GT ===
The Modenas Z15GT is a 150cc "supermoped" launched in Malaysia in October 2025, developed as the first fully Malaysian-designed model in technical partnership with Kawasaki. It features a sharp, aggressive design inspired by Kawasaki’s "Sugomi" philosophy.

== Kawasaki Based Models ==
In 2019, it was announced that Kawasaki has expanded their share in Modenas to 30% from 19% previously. With the new arrangements, Modenas would also be able to sell selected Kawasaki motorcycles under the Modenas name by 2022. Initially, these models would be limited from 250cc to 650cc bikes, and would be assembled CKD at Modenas's Gurun factory. The first models launched by the new Kawasaki/Modenas arrangement are the Ninja 250 series.

- Ninja 250 / Ninja 250 ABS
- Z250 SE / Z250 ABS
- Z650 ABS
- Versys 650
- ZX-25R / ZX-25R SE

=== Kawasaki ZX-6R ===
In 2024, Modenas announced that the Gurun assembled Kawasaki ZX-6R would be exported to China. This is after Modenas has gained approval from both Kawasaki Heavy Industries and the China Quality Certification Centre to do so. The model would be sold locally in 2025.

== Participation in motorcycle races ==
Modenas formed a factory team and supported some other teams using their machines to take part in Malaysian Cub Prix, a tournament of moped held in Malaysia to compete with Yamaha and Suzuki machines. The teams use Modenas Kriss machines for Wira category and Modenas Dinamik for Expert category.

Modenas also used to take part in MotoGP via Team Modenas KR before being taken over by Proton in 2001. Kenny Roberts and Bud Aksland built the 500 cc V3-cylinder 2-stroke machine for the team.
