= 2001 South African motorcycle Grand Prix =

(South Africa) 2001 South African Grand Prix
Race details
- Race 2 of 16 races in the 2001 Grand Prix motorcycle racing season
- Date: 22 April 2001
- Official name: Gauloises Africa's Grand Prix
- Location: Phakisa Freeway
- Course: Permanent racing facility; 4.242 km (2.636 mi)

500cc
Pole position
- Rider: (Italy) Valentino Rossi
- Time: 1:34.629
Fastest lap
- Rider: (Italy) Valentino Rossi
- Time: 1:35.508 on lap 28
Podium
- First: (Italy) Valentino Rossi
- Second: (Italy) Loris Capirossi
- Third: (Japan) Tohru Ukawa

250cc
Pole position
- Rider: (Japan) Daijiro Kato
- Time: 1:36.937
Fastest lap
- Rider: (Italy) Marco Melandri
- Time: 1:36.828 on lap 26
Podium
- First: (Japan) Daijiro Kato
- Second: (Italy) Marco Melandri
- Third: (Japan) Tetsuya Harada

125cc
Pole position
- Rider: (Japan) Youichi Ui
- Time: 1:42.059
Fastest lap
- Rider: (Japan) Youichi Ui
- Time: 1:42.611 on lap 7
Podium
- First: (Japan) Youichi Ui
- Second: (San Marino) Manuel Poggiali
- Third: (Japan) Noboru Ueda

The 2001 South African motorcycle Grand Prix was the second round of the 2001 Grand Prix motorcycle racing season. It took place on the weekend of 20–22 April 2001 at the Phakisa Freeway.

== 500 cc classification ==
Pos.	No.	Rider	Team	Manufacturer	Laps	Time/Retired	Grid	Points
1	46	(Italy) Valentino Rossi	Nastro Azzurro Honda	Honda	28	45:03.414	1	25
2	65	(Italy) Loris Capirossi	West Honda Pons	Honda	28	+0.660	2	20
3	11	(Japan) Tohru Ukawa	Repsol YPF Honda Team	Honda	28	+7.530	6	16
4	56	(Japan) Shinya Nakano	Gauloises Yamaha Tech 3	Yamaha	28	+8.653	3	13
5	6	(Japan) Norifumi Abe	Antena 3 Yamaha d'Antin	Yamaha	28	+9.224	7	11
6	28	(Spain) Àlex Crivillé	Repsol YPF Honda Team	Honda	28	+13.211	9	10
7	1	(United States) Kenny Roberts Jr.	Telefónica Movistar Suzuki	Suzuki	28	+13.305	5	9
8	3	(Italy) Max Biaggi	Marlboro Yamaha Team	Yamaha	28	+13.663	8	8
9	4	(Brazil) Alex Barros	West Honda Pons	Honda	28	+17.357	12	7
10	15	(Spain) Sete Gibernau	Telefónica Movistar Suzuki	Suzuki	28	+21.697	11	6
11	17	(Netherlands) Jurgen van den Goorbergh	Proton Team KR	Proton KR	28	+37.649	13	5
12	12	(Japan) Haruchika Aoki	Arie Molenaar Racing	Honda	28	+48.587	14	4
13	10	(Spain) José Luis Cardoso	Antena 3 Yamaha d'Antin	Yamaha	28	+1:01.110	17	3
14	14	(Australia) Anthony West	Dee Cee Jeans Racing Team	Honda	28	+1:06.173	19	2
15	8	(United Kingdom) Chris Walker	Shell Advance Honda	Honda	28	+1:08.255	16	1
16	19	(France) Olivier Jacque	Gauloises Yamaha Tech 3	Yamaha	28	+1:10.262	15	
17	9	(United Kingdom) Leon Haslam	Shell Advance Honda	Honda	28	+1:15.130	18	
18	16	(Sweden) Johan Stigefelt	Sabre Sport	Sabre V4	27	+1 lap	20	
19	21	(Netherlands) Barry Veneman	Dee Cee Jeans Racing Team	Honda	27	+1 lap	22	
20	68	(Australia) Mark Willis	Pulse GP	Pulse	27	+1 lap	23	
Ret	5	(Australia) Garry McCoy	Red Bull Yamaha WCM	Yamaha	17	Accident	4	
Ret	41	(Japan) Noriyuki Haga	Red Bull Yamaha WCM	Yamaha	4	Accident	10	
DNS	24	(United Kingdom) Jason Vincent	Pulse GP	Pulse	0	Did not start	21	

== 250 cc classification ==
Pos.	No.	Rider	Manufacturer	Laps	Time/Retired	Grid	Points
1	74	(Japan) Daijiro Kato	Honda	26	42:31.371	1	25
2	5	(Italy) Marco Melandri	Aprilia	26	+0.083	3	20
3	31	(Japan) Tetsuya Harada	Aprilia	26	+15.806	2	16
4	15	(Italy) Roberto Locatelli	Aprilia	26	+17.666	4	13
5	10	(Spain) Fonsi Nieto	Aprilia	26	+34.031	5	11
6	99	(United Kingdom) Jeremy McWilliams	Aprilia	26	+34.233	11	10
7	9	(Argentina) Sebastián Porto	Yamaha	26	+34.312	8	9
8	44	(Italy) Roberto Rolfo	Aprilia	26	+35.074	12	8
9	8	(Japan) Naoki Matsudo	Yamaha	26	+35.185	13	7
10	66	(Germany) Alex Hofmann	Aprilia	26	+51.599	23	6
11	18	(Malaysia) Shahrol Yuzy	Yamaha	26	+53.805	19	5
12	50	(France) Sylvain Guintoli	Aprilia	26	+54.066	15	4
13	42	(Spain) David Checa	Honda	26	+54.475	16	3
14	12	(Germany) Klaus Nöhles	Aprilia	26	+55.285	17	2
15	6	(Spain) Alex Debón	Aprilia	26	+57.738	10	1
16	20	(Spain) Jerónimo Vidal	Aprilia	26	+1:09.396	9	
17	57	(Italy) Lorenzo Lanzi	Aprilia	26	+1:19.289	22	
18	19	(France) Julien Allemand	Yamaha	26	+1:19.734	21	
19	7	(Spain) Emilio Alzamora	Honda	26	+1:20.139	18	
20	21	(Italy) Franco Battaini	Aprilia	26	+1:20.329	7	
21	23	(Brazil) César Barros	Yamaha	25	+1 lap	24	
22	55	(Italy) Diego Giugovaz	Yamaha	25	+1 lap	25	
23	51	(South Africa) Jonathan van Vuuren	Yamaha	25	+1 lap	26	
24	98	(Germany) Katja Poensgen	Aprilia	25	+1 lap	28	
Ret	81	(France) Randy de Puniet	Aprilia	24	Retirement	14	
Ret	22	(Spain) José David de Gea	Yamaha	12	Retirement	20	
DSQ	26	(Spain) Iván Silva	Honda	12	Black flag	27	
Ret	45	(United Kingdom) Stuart Edwards	Honda	9	Retirement	29	
Ret	37	(Italy) Luca Boscoscuro	Aprilia	6	Accident	6	
Ret	11	(Italy) Riccardo Chiarello	Aprilia	2	Retirement	30	

== 125 cc classification ==
Pos.	No.	Rider	Manufacturer	Laps	Time/Retired	Grid	Points
1	41	(Japan) Youichi Ui	Derbi	24	41:27.323	1	25
2	54	(San Marino) Manuel Poggiali	Gilera	24	+1.288	3	20
3	5	(Japan) Noboru Ueda	TSR-Honda	24	+7.149	2	16
4	23	(Italy) Gino Borsoi	Aprilia	24	+7.365	7	13
5	29	(Spain) Ángel Nieto Jr.	Honda	24	+7.731	5	11
6	21	(France) Arnaud Vincent	Honda	24	+7.989	11	10
7	11	(Italy) Max Sabbatani	Aprilia	24	+8.114	16	9
8	17	(Germany) Steve Jenkner	Aprilia	24	+15.140	18	8
9	15	(San Marino) Alex de Angelis	Honda	24	+24.741	14	7
10	4	(Japan) Masao Azuma	Honda	24	+30.750	9	6
11	7	(Italy) Stefano Perugini	Italjet	24	+30.833	13	5
12	6	(Italy) Mirko Giansanti	Honda	24	+31.005	17	4
13	26	(Spain) Daniel Pedrosa	Honda	24	+31.190	15	3
14	8	(Italy) Gianluigi Scalvini	Italjet	24	+31.818	8	2
15	22	(Spain) Pablo Nieto	Derbi	24	+32.198	12	1
16	25	(Spain) Joan Olivé	Honda	24	+35.977	26	
17	19	(Italy) Alessandro Brannetti	Aprilia	24	+36.383	22	
18	24	(Spain) Toni Elías	Honda	24	+37.833	6	
19	9	(Italy) Lucio Cecchinello	Aprilia	24	+58.806	4	
20	34	(Andorra) Eric Bataille	Honda	24	+1:01.405	27	
21	28	(Hungary) Gábor Talmácsi	Honda	24	+1:12.989	24	
22	39	(Czech Republic) Jaroslav Huleš	Honda	24	+1:25.036	20	
23	10	(Germany) Jarno Müller	Honda	23	+1 lap	19	
24	12	(Spain) Raúl Jara	Aprilia	23	+1 lap	29	
Ret	14	(Germany) Philipp Hafeneger	Honda	13	Retirement	28	
Ret	27	(Italy) Marco Petrini	Honda	11	Accident	25	
Ret	20	(Italy) Gaspare Caffiero	Aprilia	9	Accident	10	
Ret	31	(Spain) Ángel Rodríguez	Aprilia	8	Retirement	21	
Ret	18	(Czech Republic) Jakub Smrž	Honda	0	Accident	23	
DNS	16	(Italy) Simone Sanna	Aprilia		Did not start		
DNQ	58	(South Africa) Jason Wessels	Aprilia		Did not qualify		

== Championship standings after the race (500cc) ==
Below are the standings for the top five riders and constructors after round two has concluded.

Riders' Championship standings

Pos.	Rider	Points
1	(Italy) Valentino Rossi	50
2	(Italy) Loris Capirossi	28
3	(Italy) Max Biaggi	24
4	(Japan) Norifumi Abe	24
5	(Japan) Shinya Nakano	24

Constructors' Championship standings

Pos.	Constructor	Points
1	(Japan) Honda	50
2	(Japan) Yamaha	33
3	(Japan) Suzuki	18
4	(Malaysia) Proton KR	10
5	(United Kingdom) Sabre V4	0

- Note: Only the top five positions are included for both sets of standings.

Previous race: 2001 Japanese Grand Prix	FIM Grand Prix World Championship; 2001 season	Next race: 2001 Spanish Grand Prix
Previous race: 2000 South African Grand Prix	South African Grand Prix	Next race: 2002 South African Grand Prix
