= 2001 Italian motorcycle Grand Prix =

(Italy) 2001 Italian Grand Prix
Race details
- Race 5 of 16 races in the 2001 Grand Prix motorcycle racing season
- Date: 3 June 2001
- Official name: Gran Premio Cinzano d'Italia
- Location: Autodromo Internazionale del Mugello
- Course: Permanent racing facility; 5.245 km (3.259 mi)

500cc
Pole position
- Rider: (Italy) Valentino Rossi
- Time: 1:52.554
Fastest lap
- Rider: (Italy) Valentino Rossi
- Time: 1:54.994 on lap 6
Podium
- First: (Brazil) Alex Barros
- Second: (Italy) Loris Capirossi
- Third: (Italy) Max Biaggi

250cc
Pole position
- Rider: (Japan) Tetsuya Harada
- Time: 1:53.922
Fastest lap
- Rider: (Italy) Roberto Locatelli
- Time: 2:07.403 on lap 21
Podium
- First: (Japan) Tetsuya Harada
- Second: (Italy) Roberto Rolfo
- Third: (Italy) Marco Melandri

125cc
Pole position
- Rider: (Japan) Youichi Ui
- Time: 1:59.246
Fastest lap
- Rider: (Japan) Noboru Ueda
- Time: 2:12.363 on lap 14
Podium
- First: (Japan) Noboru Ueda
- Second: (Italy) Gino Borsoi
- Third: (San Marino) Manuel Poggiali

The 2001 Italian motorcycle Grand Prix was the fifth round of the 2001 Grand Prix motorcycle racing season. It took place on the weekend of 1–3 June 2001 at the Mugello Circuit.

== 500 cc classification ==
The race was held in two parts as rain caused its interruption; aggregate times from the two heats determined the final result.

| Pos. | No. | Rider | Team | Manufacturer | Laps | Time/Retired | Grid | Points |
|---|---|---|---|---|---|---|---|---|
| 1 | 4 | (Brazil) Alex Barros | West Honda Pons | Honda | 23 | 49:26.006 | 5 | 25 |
| 2 | 65 | (Italy) Loris Capirossi | West Honda Pons | Honda | 23 | +8.359 | 3 | 20 |
| 3 | 3 | (Italy) Max Biaggi | Marlboro Yamaha Team | Yamaha | 23 | +8.509 | 4 | 16 |
| 4 | 28 | (Spain) Àlex Crivillé | Repsol YPF Honda Team | Honda | 23 | +8.996 | 6 | 13 |
| 5 | 12 | (Japan) Haruchika Aoki | Arie Molenaar Racing | Honda | 23 | +20.651 | 17 | 11 |
| 6 | 15 | (Spain) Sete Gibernau | Telefónica Movistar Suzuki | Suzuki | 23 | +24.723 | 12 | 10 |
| 7 | 11 | (Japan) Tohru Ukawa | Repsol YPF Honda Team | Honda | 23 | +27.745 | 9 | 9 |
| 8 | 56 | (Japan) Shinya Nakano | Gauloises Yamaha Tech 3 | Yamaha | 23 | +32.768 | 10 | 8 |
| 9 | 6 | (Japan) Norick Abe | Antena 3 Yamaha d'Antin | Yamaha | 23 | +51.357 | 11 | 7 |
| 10 | 41 | (Japan) Noriyuki Haga | Red Bull Yamaha WCM | Yamaha | 23 | +1:08.505 | 13 | 6 |
| 11 | 10 | (Spain) José Luis Cardoso | Antena 3 Yamaha d'Antin | Yamaha | 23 | +1:18.026 | 14 | 5 |
| 12 | 17 | (Netherlands) Jurgen van den Goorbergh | Proton Team KR | Proton KR | 23 | +1:49.333 | 7 | 4 |
| 13 | 68 | (Australia) Mark Willis | Pulse GP | Pulse | 22 | +1 lap | 21 | 3 |
| Ret | 46 | (Italy) Valentino Rossi | Nastro Azzurro Honda | Honda | 22 | Retirement | 1 | |
| Ret | 1 | (United States) Kenny Roberts Jr. | Telefónica Movistar Suzuki | Suzuki | 20 | Retirement | 2 | |
| Ret | 24 | (United Kingdom) Jason Vincent | Pulse GP | Pulse | 20 | Retirement | 16 | |
| DSQ | 21 | (Netherlands) Barry Veneman | Dee Cee Jeans Racing Team | Honda | 17 | Disqualified | 20 | |
| Ret | 8 | (United Kingdom) Chris Walker | Shell Advance Honda | Honda | 11 | Retirement | 15 | |
| Ret | 14 | (Australia) Anthony West | Dee Cee Jeans Racing Team | Honda | 10 | Retirement | 18 | |
| Ret | 7 | (Spain) Carlos Checa | Marlboro Yamaha Team | Yamaha | 7 | Retirement | 8 | |
| Ret | 16 | (Sweden) Johan Stigefelt | Sabre Sport | Sabre V4 | 2 | Retirement | 19 | |
| DNQ | 26 | (Slovakia) Vladimír Častka | Slovnaft Paton Grand Prix | Paton | | Did not qualify | | |

== 250 cc classification ==
| Pos. | No. | Rider | Manufacturer | Laps | Time/Retired | Grid | Points |
|---|---|---|---|---|---|---|---|
| 1 | 31 | (Japan) Tetsuya Harada | Aprilia | 21 | 46:11.129 | 1 | 25 |
| 2 | 44 | (Italy) Roberto Rolfo | Aprilia | 21 | +12.729 | 10 | 20 |
| 3 | 5 | (Italy) Marco Melandri | Aprilia | 21 | +37.673 | 8 | 16 |
| 4 | 15 | (Italy) Roberto Locatelli | Aprilia | 21 | +43.860 | 5 | 13 |
| 5 | 10 | (Spain) Fonsi Nieto | Aprilia | 21 | +47.149 | 12 | 11 |
| 6 | 7 | (Spain) Emilio Alzamora | Honda | 21 | +54.884 | 17 | 10 |
| 7 | 42 | (Spain) David Checa | Honda | 21 | +57.903 | 20 | 9 |
| 8 | 6 | (Spain) Alex Debón | Aprilia | 21 | +59.092 | 9 | 8 |
| 9 | 18 | (Malaysia) Shahrol Yuzy | Yamaha | 21 | +1:00.763 | 18 | 7 |
| 10 | 74 | (Japan) Daijiro Kato | Honda | 21 | +1:11.795 | 6 | 6 |
| 11 | 57 | (Italy) Lorenzo Lanzi | Aprilia | 21 | +1:13.110 | 21 | 5 |
| 12 | 8 | (Japan) Naoki Matsudo | Yamaha | 21 | +1:40.274 | 15 | 4 |
| 13 | 22 | (Spain) José David de Gea | Yamaha | 21 | +1:42.351 | 23 | 3 |
| 14 | 98 | (Germany) Katja Poensgen | Aprilia | 21 | +1:42.515 | 28 | 2 |
| 15 | 20 | (Spain) Jerónimo Vidal | Aprilia | 21 | +1:42.911 | 19 | 1 |
| 16 | 12 | (Germany) Klaus Nöhles | Aprilia | 21 | +1:43.602 | 14 | |
| 17 | 16 | (Spain) David Tomás | Honda | 21 | +1:45.253 | 25 | |
| 18 | 66 | (Germany) Alex Hofmann | Aprilia | 21 | +1:51.411 | 13 | |
| 19 | 36 | (Spain) Luis Costa | Yamaha | 20 | +1 lap | 27 | |
| Ret | 37 | (Italy) Luca Boscoscuro | Aprilia | 16 | Retirement | 22 | |
| Ret | 11 | (Italy) Riccardo Chiarello | Aprilia | 15 | Accident | 26 | |
| Ret | 50 | (France) Sylvain Guintoli | Aprilia | 9 | Accident | 16 | |
| DSQ | 55 | (Italy) Diego Giugovaz | Yamaha | 9 | Black flag | 24 | |
| Ret | 9 | (Argentina) Sebastián Porto | Yamaha | 5 | Accident | 11 | |
| Ret | 21 | (Italy) Franco Battaini | Aprilia | 5 | Retirement | 7 | |
| Ret | 34 | (Italy) Marcellino Lucchi | Aprilia | 4 | Accident | 2 | |
| Ret | 99 | (United Kingdom) Jeremy McWilliams | Aprilia | 4 | Accident | 3 | |
| Ret | 81 | (France) Randy de Puniet | Aprilia | 3 | Accident | 4 | |
| Ret | 23 | (Brazil) César Barros | Yamaha | 1 | Accident | 29 | |
| DNQ | 45 | (United Kingdom) Stuart Edwards | Honda | | Did not qualify | | |

== 125 cc classification ==
| Pos. | No. | Rider | Manufacturer | Laps | Time/Retired | Grid | Points |
|---|---|---|---|---|---|---|---|
| 1 | 5 | (Japan) Noboru Ueda | TSR-Honda | 20 | 45:15.046 | 6 | 25 |
| 2 | 23 | (Italy) Gino Borsoi | Aprilia | 20 | +3.810 | 8 | 20 |
| 3 | 54 | (San Marino) Manuel Poggiali | Gilera | 20 | +6.917 | 12 | 16 |
| 4 | 24 | (Spain) Toni Elías | Honda | 20 | +12.917 | 2 | 13 |
| 5 | 16 | (Italy) Simone Sanna | Aprilia | 20 | +13.280 | 11 | 11 |
| 6 | 29 | (Spain) Ángel Nieto Jr. | Honda | 20 | +14.127 | 10 | 10 |
| 7 | 21 | (France) Arnaud Vincent | Honda | 20 | +21.103 | 20 | 9 |
| 8 | 4 | (Japan) Masao Azuma | Honda | 20 | +21.250 | 7 | 8 |
| 9 | 10 | (Germany) Jarno Müller | Honda | 20 | +21.263 | 15 | 7 |
| 10 | 15 | (San Marino) Alex de Angelis | Honda | 20 | +25.424 | 18 | 6 |
| 11 | 50 | (Italy) Andrea Ballerini | Aprilia | 20 | +27.084 | 4 | 5 |
| 12 | 17 | (Germany) Steve Jenkner | Aprilia | 20 | +34.483 | 9 | 4 |
| 13 | 19 | (Italy) Alessandro Brannetti | Aprilia | 20 | +1:01.136 | 27 | 3 |
| 14 | 28 | (Hungary) Gábor Talmácsi | Honda | 20 | +1:01.892 | 24 | 2 |
| 15 | 39 | (Czech Republic) Jaroslav Huleš | Honda | 20 | +1:38.445 | 14 | 1 |
| 16 | 25 | (Spain) Joan Olivé | Honda | 20 | +1:50.790 | 22 | |
| 17 | 12 | (Spain) Raúl Jara | Aprilia | 20 | +2:00.237 | 29 | |
| 18 | 41 | (Japan) Youichi Ui | Derbi | 19 | +1 lap | 1 | |
| 19 | 20 | (Italy) Gaspare Caffiero | Aprilia | 19 | +1 lap | 31 | |
| 20 | 31 | (Spain) Ángel Rodríguez | Aprilia | 19 | +1 lap | 17 | |
| 21 | 27 | (Italy) Marco Petrini | Honda | 19 | +1 lap | 26 | |
| 22 | 52 | (Italy) Michele Conti | Honda | 19 | +1 lap | 30 | |
| 23 | 26 | (Spain) Daniel Pedrosa | Honda | 19 | +1 lap | 28 | |
| Ret | 18 | (Czech Republic) Jakub Smrž | Honda | 15 | Accident | 21 | |
| Ret | 8 | (Italy) Gianluigi Scalvini | Italjet | 14 | Retirement | 13 | |
| Ret | 22 | (Spain) Pablo Nieto | Derbi | 13 | Retirement | 16 | |
| Ret | 51 | (Italy) Andrea Dovizioso | Aprilia | 12 | Retirement | 23 | |
| Ret | 11 | (Italy) Max Sabbatani | Aprilia | 7 | Retirement | 19 | |
| Ret | 34 | (Andorra) Eric Bataille | Honda | 4 | Retirement | 25 | |
| Ret | 9 | (Italy) Lucio Cecchinello | Aprilia | 3 | Accident | 3 | |
| Ret | 7 | (Italy) Stefano Perugini | Italjet | 2 | Retirement | 5 | |
| DNS | 6 | (Italy) Mirko Giansanti | Honda | | Did not start | | |
| DNS | 14 | (Germany) Philipp Hafeneger | Honda | | Did not start | | |

== Championship standings after the race (500cc) ==
Below are the standings for the top five riders and constructors after round five has concluded.

Riders' Championship standings

| Pos. | Rider | Points |
|---|---|---|
| 1 | (Italy) Valentino Rossi | 91 |
| 2 | (Italy) Max Biaggi | 70 |
| 3 | (Italy) Loris Capirossi | 65 |
| 4 | (Japan) Norifumi Abe | 64 |
| 5 | (Brazil) Alex Barros | 60 |

Constructors' Championship standings

| Pos. | Constructor | Points |
|---|---|---|
| 1 | (Japan) Honda | 116 |
| 2 | (Japan) Yamaha | 94 |
| 3 | (Japan) Suzuki | 47 |
| 4 | (Malaysia) Proton KR | 23 |
| 5 | (New Zealand) Pulse | 3 |

- Note: Only the top five positions are included for both sets of standings.

| Previous race: 2001 French Grand Prix | FIM Grand Prix World Championship; 2001 season | Next race: 2001 Catalan Grand Prix |
| Previous race: 2000 Italian Grand Prix | Italian Grand Prix | Next race: 2002 Italian Grand Prix |
