= 2001 Dutch TT =

(Netherlands) 2001 Dutch TT
Race details
- Race 7 of 16 races in the 2001 Grand Prix motorcycle racing season
- Date: 30 June 2001
- Official name: Gauloises Dutch TT
- Location: TT Circuit Assen
- Course: Permanent racing facility; 6.049 km (3.759 mi)

500cc
Pole position
- Rider: (Italy) Loris Capirossi
- Time: 2:00.743
Fastest lap
- Rider: (Italy) Valentino Rossi
- Time: 2:02.662 on lap 12
Podium
- First: (Italy) Max Biaggi
- Second: (Italy) Valentino Rossi
- Third: (Italy) Loris Capirossi

250cc
Pole position
- Rider: (Japan) Tetsuya Harada
- Time: 2:04.363
Fastest lap
- Rider: (Japan) Tetsuya Harada
- Time: 2:06.988 on lap 14
Podium
- First: (United Kingdom) Jeremy McWilliams
- Second: (Spain) Emilio Alzamora
- Third: (Spain) David de Gea

125cc
Pole position
- Rider: (Italy) Gino Borsoi
- Time: 2:12.212
Fastest lap
- Rider: (Spain) Toni Elías
- Time: 2:23.889 on lap 17
Podium
- First: (Spain) Toni Elías
- Second: (France) Arnaud Vincent
- Third: (Germany) Steve Jenkner

The 2001 Dutch TT was the seventh round of the 2001 Grand Prix motorcycle racing season. It took place on the weekend of 28–30 June 2001 at the TT Circuit Assen.

== 500 cc classification ==
The race was stopped after 15 of the 20 scheduled laps due to rain.

| Pos. | No. | Rider | Team | Manufacturer | Laps | Time/Retired | Grid | Points |
|---|---|---|---|---|---|---|---|---|
| 1 | 3 | (Italy) Max Biaggi | Marlboro Yamaha Team | Yamaha | 15 | 30:56.346 | 2 | 25 |
| 2 | 46 | (Italy) Valentino Rossi | Nastro Azzurro Honda | Honda | 15 | +0.126 | 3 | 20 |
| 3 | 65 | (Italy) Loris Capirossi | West Honda Pons | Honda | 15 | +0.732 | 1 | 16 |
| 4 | 4 | (Brazil) Alex Barros | West Honda Pons | Honda | 15 | +1.231 | 4 | 13 |
| 5 | 56 | (Japan) Shinya Nakano | Gauloises Yamaha Tech 3 | Yamaha | 15 | +9.844 | 5 | 11 |
| 6 | 1 | (United States) Kenny Roberts Jr. | Telefónica Movistar Suzuki | Suzuki | 15 | +10.622 | 6 | 10 |
| 7 | 15 | (Spain) Sete Gibernau | Telefónica Movistar Suzuki | Suzuki | 15 | +14.259 | 9 | 9 |
| 8 | 11 | (Japan) Tohru Ukawa | Repsol YPF Honda Team | Honda | 15 | +18.620 | 11 | 8 |
| 9 | 17 | (Netherlands) Jurgen van den Goorbergh | Proton Team KR | Proton KR | 15 | +18.857 | 14 | 7 |
| 10 | 41 | (Japan) Noriyuki Haga | Red Bull Yamaha WCM | Yamaha | 15 | +22.557 | 13 | 6 |
| 11 | 19 | (France) Olivier Jacque | Gauloises Yamaha Tech 3 | Yamaha | 15 | +32.629 | 12 | 5 |
| 12 | 10 | (Spain) José Luis Cardoso | Antena 3 Yamaha d'Antin | Yamaha | 15 | +1:00.316 | 17 | 4 |
| 13 | 9 | (United Kingdom) Leon Haslam | Shell Advance Honda | Honda | 15 | +1:00.461 | 15 | 3 |
| 14 | 12 | (Japan) Haruchika Aoki | Arie Molenaar Racing | Honda | 15 | +1:00.686 | 16 | 2 |
| 15 | 14 | (Australia) Anthony West | Dee Cee Jeans Racing Team | Honda | 15 | +1:07.276 | 18 | 1 |
| 16 | 68 | (Australia) Mark Willis | Pulse GP | Pulse | 15 | +1:19.375 | 22 | |
| 17 | 21 | (Netherlands) Barry Veneman | Dee Cee Jeans Racing Team | Honda | 15 | +1:27.921 | 21 | |
| 18 | 16 | (Sweden) Johan Stigefelt | Sabre Sport | Sabre V4 | 13 | +2 laps | 19 | |
| Ret | 28 | (Spain) Àlex Crivillé | Repsol YPF Honda Team | Honda | 3 | Accident | 10 | |
| Ret | 6 | (Japan) Norick Abe | Antena 3 Yamaha d'Antin | Yamaha | 2 | Accident | 8 | |
| Ret | 7 | (Spain) Carlos Checa | Marlboro Yamaha Team | Yamaha | 2 | Accident | 7 | |
| Ret | 24 | (United Kingdom) Jason Vincent | Pulse GP | Pulse | 1 | Retirement | 20 | |
| DNS | 5 | (Australia) Garry McCoy | Red Bull Yamaha WCM | Yamaha | | Did not start | | |
| DNS | 8 | (United Kingdom) Chris Walker | Shell Advance Honda | Honda | | Did not start | | |

== 250 cc classification ==
| Pos. | No. | Rider | Manufacturer | Laps | Time/Retired | Grid | Points |
|---|---|---|---|---|---|---|---|
| 1 | 99 | (United Kingdom) Jeremy McWilliams | Aprilia | 18 | 39:28.516 | 4 | 25 |
| 2 | 7 | (Spain) Emilio Alzamora | Honda | 18 | +16.371 | 17 | 20 |
| 3 | 22 | (Spain) José David de Gea | Yamaha | 18 | +38.409 | 19 | 16 |
| 4 | 50 | (France) Sylvain Guintoli | Aprilia | 18 | +39.214 | 13 | 13 |
| 5 | 21 | (Italy) Franco Battaini | Aprilia | 18 | +1:09.461 | 21 | 11 |
| 6 | 5 | (Italy) Marco Melandri | Aprilia | 18 | +1:29.468 | 3 | 10 |
| 7 | 37 | (Italy) Luca Boscoscuro | Aprilia | 18 | +1:37.463 | 14 | 9 |
| 8 | 11 | (Italy) Riccardo Chiarello | Aprilia | 18 | +1:41.959 | 23 | 8 |
| 9 | 20 | (Spain) Jerónimo Vidal | Aprilia | 18 | +1:42.287 | 20 | 7 |
| 10 | 16 | (Spain) David Tomás | Honda | 18 | +1:44.715 | 22 | 6 |
| 11 | 74 | (Japan) Daijiro Kato | Honda | 18 | +2:08.641 | 2 | 5 |
| 12 | 66 | (Germany) Alex Hofmann | Aprilia | 17 | +1 lap | 12 | 4 |
| 13 | 81 | (France) Randy de Puniet | Aprilia | 17 | +1 lap | 6 | 3 |
| 14 | 9 | (Argentina) Sebastián Porto | Yamaha | 17 | +1 lap | 8 | 2 |
| 15 | 61 | (Netherlands) Jarno Boesveld | Yamaha | 17 | +1 lap | 29 | 1 |
| 16 | 57 | (Italy) Lorenzo Lanzi | Aprilia | 17 | +1 lap | 15 | |
| 17 | 15 | (Italy) Roberto Locatelli | Aprilia | 17 | +1 lap | 9 | |
| 18 | 12 | (Germany) Klaus Nöhles | Aprilia | 17 | +1 lap | 16 | |
| 19 | 8 | (Japan) Naoki Matsudo | Yamaha | 17 | +1 lap | 7 | |
| 20 | 6 | (Spain) Alex Debón | Aprilia | 17 | +1 lap | 11 | |
| 21 | 60 | (Netherlands) Gert Pieper | Honda | 17 | +1 lap | 31 | |
| 22 | 36 | (Spain) Luis Costa | Yamaha | 17 | +1 lap | 25 | |
| 23 | 63 | (Netherlands) Arnold Litjens | Honda | 17 | +1 lap | 30 | |
| 24 | 31 | (Japan) Tetsuya Harada | Aprilia | 17 | +1 lap | 1 | |
| 25 | 23 | (Brazil) César Barros | Yamaha | 16 | +2 laps | 28 | |
| 26 | 18 | (Malaysia) Shahrol Yuzy | Yamaha | 15 | +3 laps | 10 | |
| Ret | 98 | (Germany) Katja Poensgen | Aprilia | 15 | Accident | 27 | |
| Ret | 55 | (Italy) Diego Giugovaz | Yamaha | 12 | Accident | 26 | |
| Ret | 62 | (United States) Jason DiSalvo | Honda | 8 | Retirement | 24 | |
| Ret | 44 | (Italy) Roberto Rolfo | Aprilia | 6 | Retirement | 5 | |
| Ret | 45 | (United Kingdom) Stuart Edwards | Honda | 5 | Accident | 32 | |
| Ret | 42 | (Spain) David Checa | Honda | 1 | Accident | 18 | |
| DNS | 10 | (Spain) Fonsi Nieto | Aprilia | | Did not start | | |

== 125 cc classification ==
| Pos. | No. | Rider | Manufacturer | Laps | Time/Retired | Grid | Points |
|---|---|---|---|---|---|---|---|
| 1 | 24 | (Spain) Toni Elías | Honda | 17 | 41:34.738 | 5 | 25 |
| 2 | 21 | (France) Arnaud Vincent | Honda | 17 | +0.607 | 13 | 20 |
| 3 | 17 | (Germany) Steve Jenkner | Aprilia | 17 | +23.253 | 4 | 16 |
| 4 | 5 | (Japan) Noboru Ueda | TSR-Honda | 17 | +33.979 | 20 | 13 |
| 5 | 18 | (Czech Republic) Jakub Smrž | Honda | 17 | +40.196 | 12 | 11 |
| 6 | 23 | (Italy) Gino Borsoi | Aprilia | 17 | +48.556 | 1 | 10 |
| 7 | 6 | (Italy) Mirko Giansanti | Honda | 17 | +48.892 | 26 | 9 |
| 8 | 39 | (Czech Republic) Jaroslav Huleš | Honda | 17 | +57.998 | 7 | 8 |
| 9 | 19 | (Italy) Alessandro Brannetti | Aprilia | 17 | +1:14.063 | 25 | 7 |
| 10 | 10 | (Germany) Jarno Müller | Honda | 17 | +1:15.060 | 11 | 6 |
| 11 | 16 | (Italy) Simone Sanna | Aprilia | 17 | +1:26.168 | 18 | 5 |
| 12 | 7 | (Italy) Stefano Perugini | Italjet | 17 | +1:44.150 | 19 | 4 |
| 13 | 77 | (Spain) Adrián Araujo | Honda | 17 | +1:49.270 | 31 | 3 |
| 14 | 12 | (Spain) Raúl Jara | Aprilia | 17 | +1:51.773 | 28 | 2 |
| 15 | 11 | (Italy) Max Sabbatani | Aprilia | 17 | +1:52.151 | 21 | 1 |
| 16 | 27 | (Italy) Marco Petrini | Honda | 17 | +1:52.504 | 27 | |
| 17 | 34 | (Andorra) Eric Bataille | Honda | 17 | +2:23.022 | 29 | |
| 18 | 68 | (Netherlands) Wilhelm van Leeuwen | Honda | 16 | +1 lap | 30 | |
| 19 | 69 | (Netherlands) Ronnie Timmer | Yamaha | 16 | +1 lap | 34 | |
| Ret | 41 | (Japan) Youichi Ui | Derbi | 12 | Accident | 3 | |
| Ret | 54 | (San Marino) Manuel Poggiali | Gilera | 11 | Accident | 6 | |
| Ret | 26 | (Spain) Daniel Pedrosa | Honda | 10 | Accident | 10 | |
| Ret | 70 | (Netherlands) Patrick Lakerveld | Honda | 10 | Accident | 32 | |
| Ret | 31 | (Spain) Ángel Rodríguez | Aprilia | 9 | Accident | 16 | |
| Ret | 29 | (Spain) Ángel Nieto Jr. | Honda | 8 | Accident | 14 | |
| Ret | 9 | (Italy) Lucio Cecchinello | Aprilia | 6 | Retirement | 2 | |
| Ret | 25 | (Spain) Joan Olivé | Honda | 5 | Accident | 23 | |
| Ret | 67 | (Netherlands) Adri den Bekker | Honda | 3 | Accident | 33 | |
| Ret | 28 | (Hungary) Gábor Talmácsi | Honda | 2 | Accident | 24 | |
| Ret | 4 | (Japan) Masao Azuma | Honda | 2 | Accident | 17 | |
| Ret | 15 | (San Marino) Alex de Angelis | Honda | 0 | Accident | 9 | |
| Ret | 20 | (Italy) Gaspare Caffiero | Aprilia | 0 | Accident | 22 | |
| Ret | 22 | (Spain) Pablo Nieto | Derbi | 0 | Accident | 8 | |
| Ret | 8 | (Italy) Gianluigi Scalvini | Italjet | 0 | Accident | 15 | |

== Championship standings after the race (500cc) ==
Below are the standings for the top five riders and constructors after round seven has concluded.

Riders' Championship standings

| Pos. | Rider | Points |
|---|---|---|
| 1 | (Italy) Valentino Rossi | 136 |
| 2 | (Italy) Max Biaggi | 115 |
| 3 | (Italy) Loris Capirossi | 97 |
| 4 | (Japan) Norifumi Abe | 74 |
| 5 | (Japan) Shinya Nakano | 74 |

Constructors' Championship standings

| Pos. | Constructor | Points |
|---|---|---|
| 1 | (Japan) Honda | 161 |
| 2 | (Japan) Yamaha | 139 |
| 3 | (Japan) Suzuki | 68 |
| 4 | (Malaysia) Proton KR | 37 |
| 5 | (New Zealand) Pulse | 3 |

- Note: Only the top five positions are included for both sets of standings.

| Previous race: 2001 Catalan Grand Prix | FIM Grand Prix World Championship; 2001 season | Next race: 2001 British Grand Prix |
| Previous race: 2000 Dutch TT | Dutch TT | Next race: 2002 Dutch TT |
