= Katja Poensgen =

German motorcycle racer

- Nationality: German
- Born: 23 September 1976 (age 50); Mindelheim, West Germany
- Bike number: 65
Motorcycle racing career statistics
250cc World Championship
Active years	2001 and 2003
Manufacturers	Aprilia, Honda
2003 championship position	NC (0 pts)
Starts / Wins / Podiums / Poles / F. laps / Points; 24 / 0 / 0 / 0 / 0 / 2
Supersport World Championship
Active years	1998
Manufacturers	Suzuki
1998 championship position	NC (0 pts)
Starts / Wins / Podiums / Poles / F. laps / Points; 1 / 0 / 0 / 0 / 0 / 0

Katja Poensgen (born 23 September 1976) is a German former professional motorcycle racer. She was the first female competitor to qualify for a 250cc Grand Prix race. In 2011, Poensgen was inducted into the FIM Hall of Fame for her pioneering Grand Prix racing career.

== Motorcycle racing career ==
Poensgen was born in Mindelheim, Germany as the daughter of the German importer for Suzuki motorcycles. She began riding motorcycles at the age of four. She started her motorcycle racing career in 1993 competing in the ADAC Junior Cup. In 1995, Poensgen rode a Suzuki RGV250 to become the first female to win the Junior Cup in Germany. That same year, she won the European Supermono championship riding a Suzuki DR650. In 1996, she competed in the German 125cc Championship. The next year, she moved to German Supersport Championship.

In 1998, Poensgen made her world championship debut when she took part in the German round of the Supersport World Championship at the Nürburgring circuit. She rode a Suzuki GSX-R600 to a 20th place finish. In 1999, Poensgen began competing in the European Superstock 1000 Championship with a Suzuki GSX 750 R. In 2000, she rode for the Alstare Corona Suzuki Team in the same championship, finishing the season ranked sixth. She also set the fastest lap time twice and scored a second place result at the Misano Adriatico race circuit.

In 2001, Poensgen moved to the 250cc class in Grand Prix motorcycle racing. She became the third female competitor in Grand Prix motorcycle racing history after Taru Rinne and Tomoko Igata. She began the season riding an Aprilia RSV 250 but, changed motorcycles mid-season to a Hardwick Racing Honda RS250R. On April 8, 2001, Poensgen became the first female competitor to qualify for a 250cc Grand Prix race at the 2001 Japanese Grand Prix. In 2002, she competed in German Superstock 1000. In 2003, she came back to Grand Prix motorcycle racing, without scoring points.

In 2004, Poensgen worked as a commentator on German television.

== Career statistics ==
=== Supersport World Championship ===
==== Races by year ====
Year	Bike	1	2	3	4	5	6	7	8	9	10	Pos.	Pts
1998	Suzuki	GBR	ITA	SPA	GER; 20	ITA	ZAF	USA	GBR	AUT	NED		0

=== Superstock European Championship ===
==== Races by year ====
(key) (Races in bold indicate pole position) (Races in italics indicate fastest lap)

Year	Bike	1	2	3	4	5	6	7	8	9	Pos	Pts
2000	Suzuki	DON; Ret	MNZ; 10	HOC; 5	SMR; 2	VAL; Ret	BRA; 7	OSC; 4	NED; 6	BRA2; 11	6th	74
2002	Suzuki	VAL	MNZ	SIL	LAU; DSQ	SMR	BRA	OSC	NED	IMO	NC	0

=== Grand Prix motorcycle racing ===
==== By season ====
Season	Class	Motorcycle	Team	Race	Win	Pod	Pole	FLap	Pts	Pos
2001	250cc	Aprilia	Dark Dog Racing Factory	14	0	0	0	0	2	30th
2001	250cc	Honda	Shell Advance Honda	14	0	0	0	0	2	30th
2003	250cc	Honda	Dark Dog Molenaar	10	0	0	0	0	0	NC
Total				**24**	**0**	**0**	**0**	**0**	**2**	

==== Races by year ====
(key)

Year	Class	Team	1	2	3	4	5	6	7	8	9	10	11	12	13	14	15	16	Pos.	Pts
2001	250cc	Aprilia	JPN; 22	RSA; 24	SPA; 23	FRA; DNS	ITA; 14	CAT; 26	NED; Ret	GBR; 23	GER; 20	CZE							30th	2
2001	250cc	Honda											POR; 20	VAL; 24	PAC; 26	AUS; 19	MAL; Ret	BRA; 26	30th	2
2003	250cc	Honda	JPN; 20	RSA; Ret	SPA; DNQ	FRA; DNQ	ITA; DNQ	CAT; 17	NED; 18	GBR; 19	GER; 18	CZE; 20	POR; Ret	BRA; DNS	PAC	MAL; 17	AUS; Ret	VAL	NC	0
