= 2001 Catalan motorcycle Grand Prix =

(Catalonia) 2001 Catalan Grand Prix
Race details
- Race 6 of 16 races in the 2001 Grand Prix motorcycle racing season
- Date: 17 June 2001
- Official name: Gran Premi Marlboro de Catalunya
- Location: Circuit de Catalunya
- Course: Permanent racing facility; 4.727 km (2.937 mi)

500cc
Pole position
- Rider: (Italy) Valentino Rossi
- Time: 1:45.507
Fastest lap
- Rider: (Italy) Valentino Rossi
- Time: 1:46.619 on lap 5
Podium
- First: (Italy) Valentino Rossi
- Second: (Italy) Max Biaggi
- Third: (Italy) Loris Capirossi

250cc
Pole position
- Rider: (Japan) Daijiro Kato
- Time: 1:47.261
Fastest lap
- Rider: (Japan) Daijiro Kato
- Time: 1:48.014 on lap 21
Podium
- First: (Japan) Daijiro Kato
- Second: (Japan) Tetsuya Harada
- Third: (Italy) Roberto Rolfo

125cc
Pole position
- Rider: (Italy) Lucio Cecchinello
- Time: 1:51.368
Fastest lap
- Rider: (Italy) Stefano Perugini
- Time: 1:51.811 on lap 8
Podium
- First: (Italy) Lucio Cecchinello
- Second: (Spain) Toni Elías
- Third: (San Marino) Manuel Poggiali

The 2001 Catalan motorcycle Grand Prix was the sixth round of the 2001 Grand Prix motorcycle racing season. It took place on the weekend of 15–17 June 2001 at the Circuit de Catalunya. 84,000 people attended the race.

== 500 cc classification ==
Pos.	No.	Rider	Team	Manufacturer	Laps	Time/Retired	Grid	Points
1	46	(Italy) Valentino Rossi	Nastro Azzurro Honda	Honda	25	44:57.142	1	25
2	3	(Italy) Max Biaggi	Marlboro Yamaha Team	Yamaha	25	+2.579	4	20
3	65	(Italy) Loris Capirossi	West Honda Pons	Honda	25	+3.216	3	16
4	56	(Japan) Shinya Nakano	Gauloises Yamaha Tech 3	Yamaha	25	+3.257	2	13
5	15	(Spain) Sete Gibernau	Telefónica Movistar Suzuki	Suzuki	25	+3.989	10	11
6	6	(Japan) Norick Abe	Antena 3 Yamaha d'Antin	Yamaha	25	+4.705	8	10
7	11	(Japan) Tohru Ukawa	Repsol YPF Honda Team	Honda	25	+4.769	9	9
8	7	(Spain) Carlos Checa	Marlboro Yamaha Team	Yamaha	25	+13.459	12	8
9	17	(Netherlands) Jurgen van den Goorbergh	Proton Team KR	Proton KR	25	+13.903	6	7
10	41	(Japan) Noriyuki Haga	Red Bull Yamaha WCM	Yamaha	25	+19.616	13	6
11	28	(Spain) Àlex Crivillé	Repsol YPF Honda Team	Honda	25	+26.378	11	5
12	19	(France) Olivier Jacque	Gauloises Yamaha Tech 3	Yamaha	25	+37.301	15	4
13	8	(United Kingdom) Chris Walker	Shell Advance Honda	Honda	25	+1:01.010	16	3
14	10	(Spain) José Luis Cardoso	Antena 3 Yamaha d'Antin	Yamaha	25	+1:13.371	14	2
15	12	(Japan) Haruchika Aoki	Arie Molenaar Racing	Honda	25	+1:19.363	17	1
16	24	(United Kingdom) Jason Vincent	Pulse GP	Pulse	25	+1:19.756	19	
17	16	(Sweden) Johan Stigefelt	Sabre Sport	Sabre V4	25	+1:24.089	21	
18	68	(Australia) Mark Willis	Pulse GP	Pulse	23	+2 laps	20	
Ret	14	(Australia) Anthony West	Dee Cee Jeans Racing Team	Honda	6	Retirement	18	
Ret	4	(Brazil) Alex Barros	West Honda Pons	Honda	6	Retirement	5	
Ret	1	(United States) Kenny Roberts Jr.	Telefónica Movistar Suzuki	Suzuki	3	Accident	7	
DNS	5	(Australia) Garry McCoy	Red Bull Yamaha WCM	Yamaha		Did not start		
WD	9	(United Kingdom) Leon Haslam	Shell Advance Honda	Honda		Withdrew		

== 250 cc classification ==
Pos.	No.	Rider	Manufacturer	Laps	Time/Retired	Grid	Points
1	74	(Japan) Daijiro Kato	Honda	23	41:40.347	1	25
2	31	(Japan) Tetsuya Harada	Aprilia	23	+0.114	2	20
3	44	(Italy) Roberto Rolfo	Aprilia	23	+12.573	6	16
4	15	(Italy) Roberto Locatelli	Aprilia	23	+19.077	8	13
5	10	(Spain) Fonsi Nieto	Aprilia	23	+22.776	3	11
6	99	(United Kingdom) Jeremy McWilliams	Aprilia	23	+22.853	5	10
7	7	(Spain) Emilio Alzamora	Honda	23	+22.876	7	9
8	81	(France) Randy de Puniet	Aprilia	23	+31.224	9	8
9	66	(Germany) Alex Hofmann	Aprilia	23	+33.567	14	7
10	8	(Japan) Naoki Matsudo	Yamaha	23	+37.754	11	6
11	6	(Spain) Alex Debón	Aprilia	23	+38.039	10	5
12	18	(Malaysia) Shahrol Yuzy	Yamaha	23	+38.100	21	4
13	46	(Japan) Taro Sekiguchi	Yamaha	23	+38.182	18	3
14	9	(Argentina) Sebastián Porto	Yamaha	23	+38.312	15	2
15	12	(Germany) Klaus Nöhles	Aprilia	23	+38.701	12	1
16	42	(Spain) David Checa	Honda	23	+42.643	17	
17	37	(Italy) Luca Boscoscuro	Aprilia	23	+42.647	20	
18	50	(France) Sylvain Guintoli	Aprilia	23	+49.236	16	
19	57	(Italy) Lorenzo Lanzi	Aprilia	23	+50.798	19	
20	21	(Italy) Franco Battaini	Aprilia	23	+56.073	13	
21	22	(Spain) José David de Gea	Yamaha	23	+1:30.364	23	
22	16	(Spain) David Tomás	Honda	23	+1:30.432	24	
23	11	(Italy) Riccardo Chiarello	Aprilia	23	+1:53.441	26	
24	38	(Spain) Álvaro Molina	Yamaha	23	+1:53.584	27	
25	36	(Spain) Luis Costa	Yamaha	22	+1 lap	28	
26	98	(Germany) Katja Poensgen	Aprilia	22	+1 lap	25	
Ret	5	(Italy) Marco Melandri	Aprilia	10	Accident	4	
Ret	20	(Spain) Jerónimo Vidal	Aprilia	6	Retirement	22	
Ret	45	(United Kingdom) Stuart Edwards	Honda	5	Retirement	29	
DNS	23	(Brazil) César Barros	Yamaha		Did not start		

== 125 cc classification ==
Pos.	No.	Rider	Manufacturer	Laps	Time/Retired	Grid	Points
1	9	(Italy) Lucio Cecchinello	Aprilia	22	41:31.696	1	25
2	24	(Spain) Toni Elías	Honda	22	+0.573	5	20
3	54	(San Marino) Manuel Poggiali	Gilera	22	+6.764	7	16
4	17	(Germany) Steve Jenkner	Aprilia	22	+6.854	6	13
5	41	(Japan) Youichi Ui	Derbi	22	+7.029	3	11
6	22	(Spain) Pablo Nieto	Derbi	22	+7.558	15	10
7	26	(Spain) Daniel Pedrosa	Honda	22	+7.788	13	9
8	25	(Spain) Joan Olivé	Honda	22	+18.438	19	8
9	15	(San Marino) Alex de Angelis	Honda	22	+18.602	20	7
10	16	(Italy) Simone Sanna	Aprilia	22	+23.109	12	6
11	7	(Italy) Stefano Perugini	Italjet	22	+23.232	4	5
12	29	(Spain) Ángel Nieto Jr.	Honda	22	+23.291	23	4
13	8	(Italy) Gianluigi Scalvini	Italjet	22	+23.652	16	3
14	21	(France) Arnaud Vincent	Honda	22	+24.308	21	2
15	10	(Germany) Jarno Müller	Honda	22	+24.465	9	1
16	6	(Italy) Mirko Giansanti	Honda	22	+31.927	17	
17	28	(Hungary) Gábor Talmácsi	Honda	22	+31.955	24	
18	23	(Italy) Gino Borsoi	Aprilia	22	+33.274	14	
19	18	(Czech Republic) Jakub Smrž	Honda	22	+42.904	22	
20	19	(Italy) Alessandro Brannetti	Aprilia	22	+53.226	26	
21	11	(Italy) Max Sabbatani	Aprilia	22	+1:09.855	11	
22	20	(Italy) Gaspare Caffiero	Aprilia	22	+1:30.468	29	
23	12	(Spain) Raúl Jara	Aprilia	21	+1 lap	27	
24	77	(Spain) Adrián Araujo	Honda	21	+1 lap	30	
Ret	4	(Japan) Masao Azuma	Honda	21	Accident	18	
Ret	27	(Italy) Marco Petrini	Honda	12	Retirement	25	
Ret	5	(Japan) Noboru Ueda	TSR-Honda	9	Accident	2	
Ret	39	(Czech Republic) Jaroslav Huleš	Honda	8	Retirement	10	
Ret	43	(Spain) Daniel Piñera	Honda	2	Retirement	28	
Ret	31	(Spain) Ángel Rodríguez	Aprilia	0	Accident	8	
DNS	34	(Andorra) Eric Bataille	Honda		Did not start		

== Championship standings after the race (500cc) ==
Below are the standings for the top five riders and constructors after round seven has concluded.

Riders' Championship standings

Pos.	Rider	Points
1	(Italy) Valentino Rossi	116
2	(Italy) Max Biaggi	90
3	(Italy) Loris Capirossi	81
4	(Japan) Norifumi Abe	74
5	(Japan) Shinya Nakano	63

Constructors' Championship standings

Pos.	Constructor	Points
1	(Japan) Honda	141
2	(Japan) Yamaha	114
3	(Japan) Suzuki	58
4	(Malaysia) Proton KR	30
5	(New Zealand) Pulse	3

- Note: Only the top five positions are included for both sets of standings.

Previous race: 2001 Italian Grand Prix	FIM Grand Prix World Championship; 2001 season	Next race: 2001 Dutch TT
Previous race: 2000 Catalan Grand Prix	Catalan Grand Prix	Next race: 2002 Catalan Grand Prix
