= Ángel Rodríguez (motorcyclist) =

Spanish motorcycle racer

- Rodríguez at the 2012 French Grand Prix
- Nationality: Spanish
- Born: 20 May 1985 (age 41); Elche, Spain
- Current team: TACK Kawasaki
- Bike number: 47
Motorcycle racing career statistics
Moto2 World Championship
Active years	2012
Manufacturers	FTR, Bimota
Championships	0
2012 championship position	NC (0 pts)
Starts / Wins / Podiums / Poles / F. laps / Points; 6 / 0 / 0 / 0 / 0 / 0
250cc World Championship
Active years	2002, 2009
Manufacturers	Aprilia
Championships	0
2009 championship position	NC (0 pts)
Starts / Wins / Podiums / Poles / F. laps / Points; 2 / 0 / 0 / 0 / 0 / 0
125cc World Championship
Active years	2000–2002, 2004–2006
Manufacturers	Aprilia, Derbi, Honda
Championships	0
2006 championship position	18th (20 pts)
Starts / Wins / Podiums / Poles / F. laps / Points; 64 / 0 / 0 / 0 / 1 / 82
Supersport World Championship
Active years	2008
Manufacturers	Yamaha
Championships	0
2008 championship position	24th (14 pts)
Starts / Wins / Podiums / Poles / F. laps / Points; 3 / 0 / 0 / 0 / 0 / 14

Ángel Rodríguez Campillo (born 20 May 1985 in Elche, Province of Alicante, Spain) is a professional Grand Prix motorcycle road racer. He raced in the 125cc and 250cc World championships between 2000 and 2009. He currently competes in the RFME Superstock 1000 Championship, aboard a Kawasaki ZX-10R.

Rodríguez started racing in pocketbikes. He competed in the Spanish Championship, where he won the title in 2001 again riders like Casey Stoner, Jorge Lorenzo, Chaz Davies, Marco Simoncelli. He also made his debut in the 125cc World Championship in 2000. In 2001, he rode for Aspar Team with his CEV Aprilia bike. In 2001, he done some good races including a sixth place in Jerez and a great race in Phillip Island. In this race, he fight for the victory until last lap, but a rider crashed in front of him while Rodríguez was third and he crashed.

In 2002, Rodríguez continued with Aspar Team and he improved his qualification results starting some races in second row, but he had some crashes and some mechanical failures and he did not finish many races. After these bad results, Rodríguez and the Aspar team decided to finish the contract, but they were together again in the last round of the 250cc class in Valencia.

In 2004, Rodríguez rode for Derbi being Jorge Lorenzo's teammate, but he did not have good results. He was in the same team as Lorenzo but with a very different bike - older and with many mechanical problems in free practice, qualys and races, this is why Rodríguez not finish many races in the 2004 season.

In 2005 and 2006, Rodríguez improved his results in the category doing the fastest lap of the race in Australia 2005 with Team Toth bike, this was incredible because before Rodríguez arrived to this team they did not get any points that season.

In 2007, Rodríguez went to CEV, doing a great season in his first season in a 600cc bike. He finished third due to an injury.

In 2008, Rodríguez became the 600cc Spanish National Champion winning all races and doing all poles of the championship and he became European Champion, too, winning this championship against some riders who rode in World SSP. He also made three World Supersport appearances with his CEV bike doing two top-tens in three races. After this amazing season, some World SSP and World SBK were interested in signing him and also Aspar Team had some conversations with Angel for race in 2009 MotoGP season, but due to sponsors problems he did not sign with any of this teams.

In 2009, Rodríguez won the three races and he did the three poles in Spanish championship, but after that he stopped racing due to problems with RFME and for not having support of sponsors to be back at the world championship.

In 2012, Rodríguez was back in World Moto2 but after the first races he decided to finish the contract with his team because they did not have the equipment for fighting for the top-five.

After that, Rodríguez went to FIM CEV and rode with the old Suzuki, with amazing results including one pole and one victory and earning the track record in Alcarras Circuit.

In 2016 and 2017, Rodríguez finished third in CEV having good results in the category with many podiums and being one of references of the category.

== Career statistics ==
=== Grand Prix motorcycle racing ===
==== By season ====
Season	Class	Motorcycle	Team	Number	Race	Win	Podium	Pole	FLap	Pts	Plcd
2000	125cc	Aprilia	Analco-3C Racing	47	1	0	0	0	0	0	NC
2001	125cc	Aprilia	Valencia Circuit Aspar Team	31	15	0	0	0	0	27	20th
2002	125cc	Aprilia	Master-Aspar Team	47	9	0	0	0	0	17	24th
2002	250cc	Aprilia	Racing Damas	74	1	0	0	0	0	0	NC
2004	125cc	Derbi	Caja Madrid Derbi Racing	47	16	0	0	0	0	2	32nd
2005	125cc	Honda	LG Mobile Galicia Team	47	12	0	0	0	1	16	22nd
2005	125cc	Aprilia	Team Toth	47	12	0	0	0	1	16	22nd
2006	125cc	Aprilia	3C Racing	10	11	0	0	0	0	20	18th
2009	250cc	Aprilia	Balatonring Team	47	1	0	0	0	0	0	NC
2012	Moto2	FTR	Desguaces La Torre SAG	47	6	0	0	0	0	0	NC
2012	Moto2	Bimota	Desguaces La Torre SAG	47	6	0	0	0	0	0	NC
Total					**72**	**0**	**0**	**0**	**1**	**82**	

==== Races by year ====
(key) (Races in bold indicate pole position, races in italics indicate fastest lap)

Year	Class	Bike	1	2	3	4	5	6	7	8	9	10	11	12	13	14	15	16	17	Pos	Pts
2000	125cc	Aprilia	RSA	MAL	JPN	SPA	FRA	ITA	CAT; DNQ	NED	GBR	GER	CZE	POR	VAL; Ret	BRA	PAC	AUS		NC	0
2001	125cc	Aprilia	JPN; Ret	RSA; Ret	SPA; 6	FRA; DNS	ITA; 20	CAT; Ret	NED; Ret	GBR; 9	GER; 8	CZE; 17	POR; Ret	VAL; 15	PAC; 15	AUS; 23	MAL; 17	BRA; Ret		20th	27
2002	125cc	Aprilia	JPN; 7	RSA; Ret	SPA; Ret	FRA; Ret	ITA; Ret	CAT; Ret	NED; 10	GBR; Ret	GER; 14	CZE	POR	BRA	PAC	MAL	AUS			24th	17
2002	250cc	Aprilia																VAL; 18		NC	0
2004	125cc	Derbi	RSA; Ret	SPA; Ret	FRA; 18	ITA; Ret	CAT; 15	NED; 15	BRA; Ret	GER; Ret	GBR; Ret	CZE; Ret	POR; Ret	JPN; Ret	QAT; Ret	MAL; Ret	AUS; Ret	VAL; Ret		32nd	2
2005	125cc	Honda	SPA; Ret	POR; 21	CHN; Ret	FRA; Ret	ITA; Ret	CAT; 20	NED; 22	GBR; Ret	GER; Ret	CZE	JPN	MAL						22nd	16
2005	125cc	Aprilia													QAT; Ret	AUS; 8	TUR; 8	VAL		22nd	16
2006	125cc	Aprilia	SPA; Ret	QAT; 7	TUR; 10	CHN; Ret	FRA; 11	ITA; Ret	CAT; Ret	NED; Ret	GBR; 19	GER; Ret	CZE; 17	MAL	AUS	JPN	POR	VAL		18th	20
2009	250cc	Aprilia	QAT	JPN	SPA	FRA; Ret	ITA	CAT	NED	GER	GBR	CZE	INP	RSM	POR	AUS	MAL	VAL		NC	0
2012	Moto2	FTR	QAT; 20	SPA; 20	POR; 22															NC	0
2012	Moto2	Bimota				FRA; Ret	CAT; 20	GBR; 26	NED	GER	ITA	INP	CZE	RSM	ARA	JPN	MAL	AUS	VAL	NC	0

=== Supersport World Championship ===
==== Races by year ====
(key) (Races in bold indicate pole position, races in italics indicate fastest lap)

Year	Bike	1	2	3	4	5	6	7	8	9	10	11	12	13	Pos	Pts
2008	Yamaha	QAT	AUS	SPA; 8	NED; Ret	ITA; 10	GER	SMR	CZE	GBR	EUR	ITA	FRA	POR	24th	14

Sporting positions
Preceded by Joan Olivé	Spanish 125cc Champion; 2001	Succeeded by Héctor Barberá
Preceded by Graeme Gowland	Spanish Supersport Champion; 2008	Succeeded by Kev Coghlan
