= Pulse 500 =

- Manufacturer: MuZ
- Production: 2001
- Class: 500 cc
- Engine: Swissauto two-stroke V4 500 cc
- Related: MuZ 500

The Pulse 500 was a racing motorcycle that competed in the 500cc World Championship in 2001, entered by the Pulse GP team.

The Pulse GP team was formed by Dave Stewart, ex-team manager of BSL. Stewart had left BSL at the end of 2000 with the intention of setting up his own European-based GP team the following year.

The team purchased the MuZ 500, a two-stroke V4 machine which had competed in the 1999 500 cc Championship. The machines, while fast and showing potential in 1999, had been technically unchanged since then and as such were two years behind the opposition in development. The Pulse team was also severely underfunded and with no major sponsor, so no pre-season testing or development work was carried out on the bikes.

== Riders ==
- Mark Willis (AUS)
- Jason Vincent (GBR)

Having worked with Mark Willis on the BSL, team manager Stewart offered him a seat on the Pulse. The second rider was Jason Vincent who had spent several seasons in the 250 cc class, finishing 11th in that class in the previous year. Both riders faced an uphill struggle with the Pulse however, and were usually relegated to the back of the grid. Development of the bike was practically stagnant: plans were made to replace the original Mikuni carburettors with Keihins, but this never happened.

The bike scored world championship points only once, when Willis finished 13th at the 2001 Italian Grand Prix. Vincent, though consistently a better qualifier, had a best race result of 16th for Pulse, but finished 13th at that year's British Grand Prix on a Yamaha, substituting for Garry McCoy who was injured.

The team withdrew from competition after 9 of the season's 16 races due to financial issues.

== Results ==
2001 Grand Prix motorcycle racing season

| Rider | Bike | JPN (Japan) | RSA (South Africa) | ESP (Spain) | FRA (France) | ITA (Italy) | CAT (Catalonia) | NED (Netherlands) | GBR (United Kingdom) | GER (Germany) | CZE (Czech Republic) | POR (Portugal) | VAL (Valencian Community) | PAC (Tochigi Prefecture) | AUS (Australia) | MAL (Malaysia) | RIO (Rio de Janeiro (state)) | Pts |
|---|---|---|---|---|---|---|---|---|---|---|---|---|---|---|---|---|---|---|
| (Australia) Mark Willis | Pulse 500 | Ret | 20 | 19 | Ret | 13 | 18 | 16 | 19 | | | | | | | | | 3 |
| (United Kingdom) Jason Vincent | Pulse 500 | Ret | DNS | 18 | Ret | Ret | 16 | Ret | | 16 | | | | | | | | 0 |

== Specifications ==
Pulse 500 Specifications
| Engine Type: | 2-stroke water-cooled V4 |
| Displacement: | 499.27 cc |
| Max Power: | 200 BHP @ 12500 rpm |
| Carburation Type: | 4 Mikuni carbs |
| Ignition: | CDI digital |
| Clutch: | Dry multiple discs |
| Transmission: | 6-speed cassette type |
| Final Drive: | Chain |
| Frame Type: | Twin spar aluminum |
| Suspension: | Front: Inverted telescopic Rear: Ohlins mono shock |
| Tyres: | Michelin |
| Wheel: | Front: 3.5 x 17 inches Rear: 6.0 x 17 inches |
| Brake System: | Front: Carbon composite disc (320 mm), Nissin 4 pot calipers Rear: steel disc (220 mm) |
| Overall Length: | 2040 mm |
| Overall Width: | 490 mm |
| Wheelbase: | 1410 mm |
| Weight: | 129 kg (without tank) |
| Fuel Tank: | 35L |
