= 2001 French motorcycle Grand Prix =

(France) 2001 French Grand Prix
Race details
- Race 4 of 16 races in the 2001 Grand Prix motorcycle racing season
- Date: 20 May 2001
- Official name: Grand Prix Polini de France
- Location: Bugatti Circuit
- Course: Permanent racing facility; 4.305 km (2.675 mi)

500cc
Pole position
- Rider: (Italy) Max Biaggi
- Time: 1:38.421
Fastest lap
- Rider: (Italy) Max Biaggi
- Time: 1:39.954 on lap 16
Podium
- First: (Italy) Max Biaggi
- Second: (Spain) Carlos Checa
- Third: (Italy) Valentino Rossi

250cc
Pole position
- Rider: (Japan) Daijiro Kato
- Time: 1:41.065
Fastest lap
- Rider: (Japan) Daijiro Kato
- Time: 1:41.473 on lap 26
Podium
- First: (Japan) Daijiro Kato
- Second: (Japan) Tetsuya Harada
- Third: (Italy) Marco Melandri

125cc
Pole position
- Rider: (Japan) Youichi Ui
- Time: 1:47.494
Fastest lap
- Rider: (Italy) Lucio Cecchinello
- Time: 1:47.766 on lap 10
Podium
- First: (San Marino) Manuel Poggiali
- Second: (Italy) Mirko Giansanti
- Third: (Spain) Toni Elías

The 2001 French motorcycle Grand Prix was the fourth round of the 2001 Grand Prix motorcycle racing season. It took place on the weekend of 18–20 May 2001 at the Bugatti Circuit.

== 500 cc classification ==
| Pos. | No. | Rider | Team | Manufacturer | Laps | Time/Retired | Grid | Points |
|---|---|---|---|---|---|---|---|---|
| 1 | 3 | (Italy) Max Biaggi | Marlboro Yamaha Team | Yamaha | 28 | 46:59.346 | 1 | 25 |
| 2 | 7 | (Spain) Carlos Checa | Marlboro Yamaha Team | Yamaha | 28 | +3.266 | 5 | 20 |
| 3 | 46 | (Italy) Valentino Rossi | Nastro Azzurro Honda | Honda | 28 | +4.830 | 3 | 16 |
| 4 | 6 | (Japan) Norick Abe | Antena 3 Yamaha d'Antin | Yamaha | 28 | +14.561 | 7 | 13 |
| 5 | 28 | (Spain) Àlex Crivillé | Repsol YPF Honda Team | Honda | 28 | +14.977 | 9 | 11 |
| 6 | 1 | (United States) Kenny Roberts Jr. | Telefónica Movistar Suzuki | Suzuki | 28 | +23.180 | 2 | 10 |
| 7 | 65 | (Italy) Loris Capirossi | West Honda Pons | Honda | 28 | +29.597 | 8 | 9 |
| 8 | 4 | (Brazil) Alex Barros | West Honda Pons | Honda | 28 | +31.205 | 12 | 8 |
| 9 | 15 | (Spain) Sete Gibernau | Telefónica Movistar Suzuki | Suzuki | 28 | +32.499 | 13 | 7 |
| 10 | 17 | (Netherlands) Jurgen van den Goorbergh | Proton Team KR | Proton KR | 28 | +33.019 | 10 | 6 |
| 11 | 56 | (Japan) Shinya Nakano | Gauloises Yamaha Tech 3 | Yamaha | 28 | +36.476 | 4 | 5 |
| 12 | 8 | (United Kingdom) Chris Walker | Shell Advance Honda | Honda | 28 | +1:15.798 | 15 | 4 |
| 13 | 10 | (Spain) José Luis Cardoso | Antena 3 Yamaha d'Antin | Yamaha | 28 | +1:19.446 | 14 | 3 |
| 14 | 21 | (Netherlands) Barry Veneman | Dee Cee Jeans Racing Team | Honda | 27 | +1 lap | 19 | 2 |
| 15 | 32 | (Netherlands) Jarno Janssen | Arie Molenaar Racing | Honda | 27 | +1 lap | 20 | 1 |
| Ret | 24 | (United Kingdom) Jason Vincent | Pulse GP | Pulse | 16 | Retirement | 16 | |
| Ret | 68 | (Australia) Mark Willis | Pulse GP | Pulse | 15 | Retirement | 18 | |
| Ret | 11 | (Japan) Tohru Ukawa | Repsol YPF Honda Team | Honda | 10 | Accident | 11 | |
| Ret | 41 | (Japan) Noriyuki Haga | Red Bull Yamaha WCM | Yamaha | 10 | Accident | 6 | |
| Ret | 16 | (Sweden) Johan Stigefelt | Sabre Sport | Sabre V4 | 2 | Retirement | 17 | |
| DNS | 5 | (Australia) Garry McCoy | Red Bull Yamaha WCM | Yamaha | | Did not start | | |
| DNS | 9 | (United Kingdom) Leon Haslam | Shell Advance Honda | Honda | | Did not start | | |
| DNS | 14 | (Australia) Anthony West | Dee Cee Jeans Racing Team | Honda | | Did not start | | |
| WD | 19 | (France) Olivier Jacque | Gauloises Yamaha Tech 3 | Yamaha | | Withdrew | | |

== 250 cc classification ==
| Pos. | No. | Rider | Manufacturer | Laps | Time/Retired | Grid | Points |
|---|---|---|---|---|---|---|---|
| 1 | 74 | (Japan) Daijiro Kato | Honda | 26 | 44:29.546 | 1 | 25 |
| 2 | 31 | (Japan) Tetsuya Harada | Aprilia | 26 | +0.204 | 2 | 20 |
| 3 | 5 | (Italy) Marco Melandri | Aprilia | 26 | +13.599 | 3 | 16 |
| 4 | 7 | (Spain) Emilio Alzamora | Honda | 26 | +16.813 | 5 | 13 |
| 5 | 10 | (Spain) Fonsi Nieto | Aprilia | 26 | +18.429 | 4 | 11 |
| 6 | 15 | (Italy) Roberto Locatelli | Aprilia | 26 | +29.025 | 10 | 10 |
| 7 | 99 | (United Kingdom) Jeremy McWilliams | Aprilia | 26 | +42.813 | 7 | 9 |
| 8 | 9 | (Argentina) Sebastián Porto | Yamaha | 26 | +44.429 | 9 | 8 |
| 9 | 44 | (Italy) Roberto Rolfo | Aprilia | 26 | +45.077 | 12 | 7 |
| 10 | 6 | (Spain) Alex Debón | Aprilia | 26 | +45.351 | 11 | 6 |
| 11 | 66 | (Germany) Alex Hofmann | Aprilia | 26 | +47.253 | 15 | 5 |
| 12 | 12 | (Germany) Klaus Nöhles | Aprilia | 26 | +55.500 | 14 | 4 |
| 13 | 21 | (Italy) Franco Battaini | Aprilia | 26 | +56.474 | 13 | 3 |
| 14 | 50 | (France) Sylvain Guintoli | Aprilia | 26 | +57.653 | 21 | 2 |
| 15 | 18 | (Malaysia) Shahrol Yuzy | Yamaha | 26 | +1:04.735 | 18 | 1 |
| 16 | 42 | (Spain) David Checa | Honda | 26 | +1:19.767 | 17 | |
| 17 | 37 | (Italy) Luca Boscoscuro | Aprilia | 26 | +1:31.159 | 20 | |
| 18 | 22 | (Spain) José David de Gea | Yamaha | 26 | +1:31.496 | 16 | |
| 19 | 16 | (Spain) David Tomás | Honda | 26 | +1:37.808 | 29 | |
| 20 | 11 | (Italy) Riccardo Chiarello | Aprilia | 25 | +1 lap | 24 | |
| 21 | 54 | (France) Hervé Mora | Honda | 25 | +1 lap | 26 | |
| 22 | 45 | (United Kingdom) Stuart Edwards | Honda | 25 | +1 lap | 28 | |
| 23 | 52 | (France) Guillaume Dietrich | Honda | 25 | +1 lap | 31 | |
| 24 | 56 | (France) David Fouloi | Yamaha | 25 | +1 lap | 30 | |
| 25 | 23 | (Brazil) César Barros | Yamaha | 25 | +1 lap | 25 | |
| 26 | 53 | (France) Tom Ouvrard | Yamaha | 24 | +2 laps | 32 | |
| Ret | 20 | (Spain) Jerónimo Vidal | Aprilia | 11 | Retirement | 22 | |
| Ret | 8 | (Japan) Naoki Matsudo | Yamaha | 7 | Retirement | 8 | |
| Ret | 55 | (Italy) Diego Giugovaz | Yamaha | 3 | Retirement | 23 | |
| Ret | 81 | (France) Randy de Puniet | Aprilia | 2 | Accident | 6 | |
| Ret | 57 | (Italy) Lorenzo Lanzi | Aprilia | 2 | Retirement | 19 | |
| Ret | 64 | (France) Hugo Marchand | Honda | 1 | Accident | 27 | |
| DNS | 19 | (France) Julien Allemand | Yamaha | | Did not start | | |
| DNS | 98 | (Germany) Katja Poensgen | Aprilia | | Did not start | | |

== 125 cc classification ==
| Pos. | No. | Rider | Manufacturer | Laps | Time/Retired | Grid | Points |
|---|---|---|---|---|---|---|---|
| 1 | 54 | (San Marino) Manuel Poggiali | Gilera | 24 | 43:33.372 | 2 | 25 |
| 2 | 6 | (Italy) Mirko Giansanti | Honda | 24 | +0.218 | 7 | 20 |
| 3 | 24 | (Spain) Toni Elías | Honda | 24 | +0.298 | 6 | 16 |
| 4 | 23 | (Italy) Gino Borsoi | Aprilia | 24 | +0.515 | 8 | 13 |
| 5 | 9 | (Italy) Lucio Cecchinello | Aprilia | 24 | +0.969 | 3 | 11 |
| 6 | 21 | (France) Arnaud Vincent | Honda | 24 | +7.357 | 10 | 10 |
| 7 | 5 | (Japan) Noboru Ueda | TSR-Honda | 24 | +7.940 | 5 | 9 |
| 8 | 4 | (Japan) Masao Azuma | Honda | 24 | +8.464 | 17 | 8 |
| 9 | 39 | (Czech Republic) Jaroslav Huleš | Honda | 24 | +8.751 | 4 | 7 |
| 10 | 29 | (Spain) Ángel Nieto Jr. | Honda | 24 | +11.523 | 9 | 6 |
| 11 | 41 | (Japan) Youichi Ui | Derbi | 24 | +11.962 | 1 | 5 |
| 12 | 17 | (Germany) Steve Jenkner | Aprilia | 24 | +12.496 | 18 | 4 |
| 13 | 16 | (Italy) Simone Sanna | Aprilia | 24 | +12.514 | 13 | 3 |
| 14 | 15 | (San Marino) Alex de Angelis | Honda | 24 | +20.667 | 14 | 2 |
| 15 | 11 | (Italy) Max Sabbatani | Aprilia | 24 | +35.012 | 12 | 1 |
| 16 | 28 | (Hungary) Gábor Talmácsi | Honda | 24 | +36.143 | 16 | |
| 17 | 26 | (Spain) Daniel Pedrosa | Honda | 24 | +37.580 | 15 | |
| 18 | 18 | (Czech Republic) Jakub Smrž | Honda | 24 | +42.565 | 26 | |
| 19 | 10 | (Germany) Jarno Müller | Honda | 24 | +45.597 | 19 | |
| 20 | 34 | (Andorra) Eric Bataille | Honda | 24 | +59.595 | 22 | |
| 21 | 27 | (Italy) Marco Petrini | Honda | 24 | +1:16.293 | 25 | |
| 22 | 63 | (France) Jimmy Petit | Honda | 24 | +1:22.325 | 27 | |
| 23 | 20 | (Italy) Gaspare Caffiero | Aprilia | 24 | +1:35.945 | 23 | |
| 24 | 62 | (France) Erwan Nigon | Yamaha | 24 | +1:58.711 | 29 | |
| 25 | 60 | (France) Xavier Hérouin | Honda | 23 | +1 lap | 30 | |
| 26 | 14 | (Germany) Philipp Hafeneger | Honda | 23 | +1 lap | 32 | |
| 27 | 59 | (France) Julien Enjolras | Honda | 23 | +1 lap | 31 | |
| Ret | 25 | (Spain) Joan Olivé | Honda | 20 | Retirement | 21 | |
| Ret | 12 | (Spain) Raúl Jara | Aprilia | 18 | Accident | 24 | |
| Ret | 7 | (Italy) Stefano Perugini | Italjet | 9 | Retirement | 11 | |
| Ret | 61 | (France) Grégory Lefort | Aprilia | 6 | Retirement | 28 | |
| DNS | 22 | (Spain) Pablo Nieto | Derbi | 0 | Did not start | 20 | |
| DNS | 31 | (Spain) Ángel Rodríguez | Aprilia | | Did not start | | |
| DNS | 8 | (Italy) Gianluigi Scalvini | Italjet | | Did not start | | |

== Championship standings after the race (500cc) ==
Below are the standings for the top five riders and constructors after round four has concluded.

Riders' Championship standings

| Pos. | Rider | Points |
|---|---|---|
| 1 | (Italy) Valentino Rossi | 91 |
| 2 | (Japan) Norifumi Abe | 57 |
| 3 | (Italy) Max Biaggi | 54 |
| 4 | (Italy) Loris Capirossi | 45 |
| 5 | (Spain) Àlex Crivillé | 44 |

Constructors' Championship standings

| Pos. | Constructor | Points |
|---|---|---|
| 1 | (Japan) Honda | 91 |
| 2 | (Japan) Yamaha | 78 |
| 3 | (Japan) Suzuki | 37 |
| 4 | (Malaysia) Proton KR | 19 |
| 5 | (New Zealand) Pulse | 0 |

- Note: Only the top five positions are included for both sets of standings.

| Previous race: 2001 Spanish Grand Prix | FIM Grand Prix World Championship; 2001 season | Next race: 2001 Italian Grand Prix |
| Previous race: 2000 French Grand Prix | French Grand Prix | Next race: 2002 French Grand Prix |
