= Swissauto =

Swissauto is an engine company from Burgdorf (BE), Switzerland, best known for the V4 engine used in the, ELF, MuZ and Pulse 500cc Grand Prix motorcycles and World Championship Sidecars. It also has developed one of the most efficient (35%) internal combustion engines to extend the range of plug in hybrid electric vehicles.

== Specifications ==
Swissauto V4 Specifications
Engine Type:	2 stroke water cooled V4
Displacement:	499.cc
Max Power:	210 BHP @ 12500 rpm
Carburation Type:	4 Mikuni carbs
Ignition:	CDI digital
Clutch:	Dry multiple discs
Transmission:	6 speed cassette type
Final Drive:	Chain

== See also ==
- Superside
- Pulse 500
- ELF 500 ROC
