= 2001 British motorcycle Grand Prix =

(United Kingdom) 2001 British Grand Prix
Race details
- Race 8 of 16 races in the 2001 Grand Prix motorcycle racing season
- Date: 8 July 2001
- Official name: Cinzano British Grand Prix
- Location: Donington Park
- Course: Permanent racing facility; 4.023 km (2.500 mi)

500cc
Pole position
- Rider: (Italy) Max Biaggi
- Time: 1:31.964
Fastest lap
- Rider: (Italy) Valentino Rossi
- Time: 1:33.056 on lap 26
Podium
- First: (Italy) Valentino Rossi
- Second: (Italy) Max Biaggi
- Third: (Brazil) Alex Barros

250cc
Pole position
- Rider: (Japan) Tetsuya Harada
- Time: 1:33.651
Fastest lap
- Rider: (Japan) Daijiro Kato
- Time: 1:34.096 on lap 18
Podium
- First: (Japan) Daijiro Kato
- Second: (Italy) Roberto Rolfo
- Third: (Italy) Marco Melandri

125cc
Pole position
- Rider: (Spain) Toni Elías
- Time: 1:38.844
Fastest lap
- Rider: (Japan) Youichi Ui
- Time: 1:38.626 on lap 11
Podium
- First: (Japan) Youichi Ui
- Second: (Spain) Toni Elías
- Third: (San Marino) Manuel Poggiali

The 2001 British motorcycle Grand Prix was the eighth round of the 2001 Grand Prix motorcycle racing season. It took place on the weekend of 6–8 July 2001 at Donington Park.

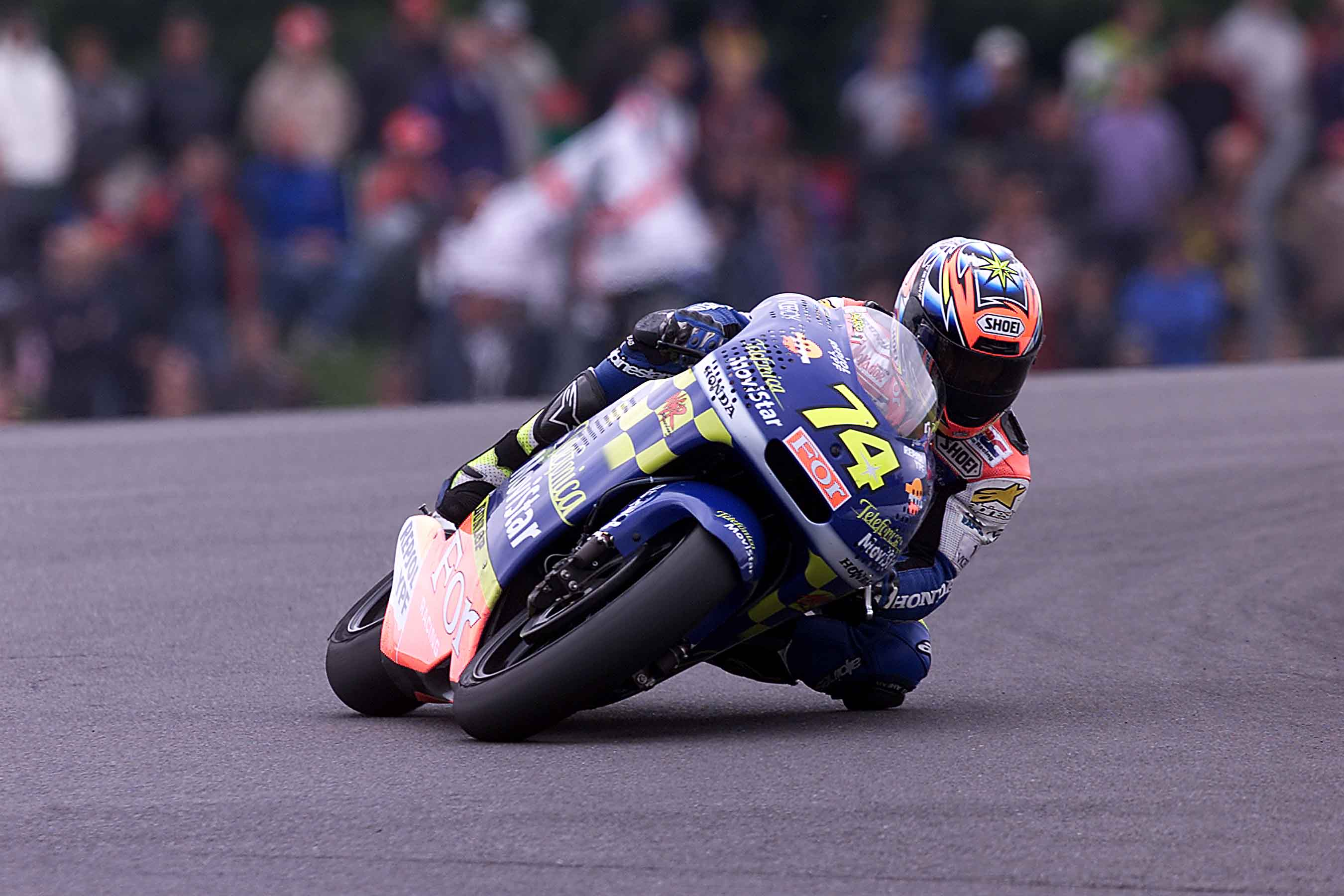
Daijiro Kato, riding his Honda in the 250cc race. He went on to win, which was his sixth victory of the year.

== 500 cc classification ==
Pos.	No.	Rider	Team	Manufacturer	Laps	Time/Retired	Grid	Points
1	46	(Italy) Valentino Rossi	Nastro Azzurro Honda	Honda	30	46:53.349	11	25
2	3	(Italy) Max Biaggi	Marlboro Yamaha Team	Yamaha	30	+1.794	1	20
3	4	(Brazil) Alex Barros	West Honda Pons	Honda	30	+2.011	3	16
4	41	(Japan) Noriyuki Haga	Red Bull Yamaha WCM	Yamaha	30	+7.610	12	13
5	7	(Spain) Carlos Checa	Marlboro Yamaha Team	Yamaha	30	+12.526	9	11
6	56	(Japan) Shinya Nakano	Gauloises Yamaha Tech 3	Yamaha	30	+12.766	4	10
7	28	(Spain) Àlex Crivillé	Repsol YPF Honda Team	Honda	30	+16.225	13	9
8	1	(United States) Kenny Roberts Jr.	Telefónica Movistar Suzuki	Suzuki	30	+16.699	6	8
9	19	(France) Olivier Jacque	Gauloises Yamaha Tech 3	Yamaha	30	+16.780	8	7
10	65	(Italy) Loris Capirossi	West Honda Pons	Honda	30	+24.781	2	6
11	15	(Spain) Sete Gibernau	Telefónica Movistar Suzuki	Suzuki	30	+29.205	7	5
12	17	(Netherlands) Jurgen van den Goorbergh	Proton Team KR	Proton KR	30	+44.984	5	4
13	24	(United Kingdom) Jason Vincent	Red Bull Yamaha WCM	Yamaha	30	+49.907	19	3
14	14	(Australia) Anthony West	Dee Cee Jeans Racing Team	Honda	30	+50.033	18	2
15	8	(United Kingdom) Chris Walker	Shell Advance Honda	Honda	30	+59.116	14	1
16	11	(Japan) Tohru Ukawa	Repsol YPF Honda Team	Honda	30	+1:04.876	16	
17	9	(United Kingdom) Leon Haslam	Shell Advance Honda	Honda	30	+1:10.748	20	
18	16	(Sweden) Johan Stigefelt	Sabre Sport	Sabre V4	29	+1 lap	22	
19	68	(Australia) Mark Willis	Pulse GP	Pulse	29	+1 lap	21	
Ret	12	(Japan) Haruchika Aoki	Arie Molenaar Racing	Honda	21	Retirement	17	
Ret	21	(Netherlands) Barry Veneman	Dee Cee Jeans Racing Team	Honda	21	Retirement	21	
Ret	6	(Japan) Norick Abe	Antena 3 Yamaha d'Antin	Yamaha	18	Retirement	15	
Ret	10	(Spain) José Luis Cardoso	Antena 3 Yamaha d'Antin	Yamaha	14	Retirement	10	
WD	27	(France) Sébastien Gimbert	Paton Grand Prix	Paton		Withdrew		

== 250 cc race classification ==
Pos.	No.	Rider	Manufacturer	Laps	Time/Retired	Grid	Points
1	74	(Japan) Daijiro Kato	Honda	27	42:46.466	2	25
2	44	(Italy) Roberto Rolfo	Aprilia	27	+10.173	7	20
3	5	(Italy) Marco Melandri	Aprilia	27	+10.401	3	16
4	7	(Spain) Emilio Alzamora	Honda	27	+25.100	4	13
5	8	(Japan) Naoki Matsudo	Yamaha	27	+46.668	6	11
6	10	(Spain) Fonsi Nieto	Aprilia	27	+51.130	9	10
7	50	(France) Sylvain Guintoli	Aprilia	27	+51.926	13	9
8	6	(Spain) Alex Debón	Aprilia	27	+52.491	11	8
9	66	(Germany) Alex Hofmann	Aprilia	27	+53.797	12	7
10	18	(Malaysia) Shahrol Yuzy	Yamaha	27	+57.984	14	6
11	42	(Spain) David Checa	Honda	27	+58.117	15	5
12	12	(Germany) Klaus Nöhles	Aprilia	27	+1:02.663	16	4
13	21	(Italy) Franco Battaini	Aprilia	27	+1:06.628	18	3
14	57	(Italy) Lorenzo Lanzi	Aprilia	27	+1:14.493	20	2
15	37	(Italy) Luca Boscoscuro	Aprilia	27	+1:16.335	19	1
16	16	(Spain) David Tomás	Honda	27	+1:21.487	23	
17	22	(Spain) José David de Gea	Yamaha	27	+1:25.057	17	
18	31	(Japan) Tetsuya Harada	Aprilia	27	+1:26.254	1	
19	45	(United Kingdom) Stuart Edwards	Honda	26	+1 lap	27	
20	55	(Italy) Diego Giugovaz	Yamaha	26	+1 lap	30	
21	36	(Spain) Luis Costa	Yamaha	26	+1 lap	29	
22	62	(United States) Jason DiSalvo	Honda	26	+1 lap	28	
23	98	(Germany) Katja Poensgen	Aprilia	26	+1 lap	32	
24	67	(United Kingdom) Michael Herzberg	Yamaha	26	+1 lap	33	
25	23	(Brazil) César Barros	Yamaha	25	+2 laps	31	
Ret	68	(United Kingdom) Stuart Easton	Honda	24	Retirement	26	
Ret	9	(Argentina) Sebastián Porto	Yamaha	23	Retirement	10	
Ret	11	(Italy) Riccardo Chiarello	Aprilia	21	Retirement	24	
Ret	20	(Spain) Jerónimo Vidal	Aprilia	17	Retirement	22	
Ret	99	(United Kingdom) Jeremy McWilliams	Aprilia	15	Accident	5	
Ret	59	(United Kingdom) Gary Jackson	Honda	7	Retirement	25	
Ret	81	(France) Randy de Puniet	Aprilia	2	Accident	8	
DNS	58	(South Africa) Shane Norval	Honda	0	Did not start	21	
DNS	15	(Italy) Roberto Locatelli	Aprilia		Did not start		

== 125 cc classification ==
Pos.	No.	Rider	Manufacturer	Laps	Time/Retired	Grid	Points
1	41	(Japan) Youichi Ui	Derbi	26	43:17.675	2	25
2	24	(Spain) Toni Elías	Honda	26	+3.129	1	20
3	54	(San Marino) Manuel Poggiali	Gilera	26	+3.869	3	16
4	4	(Japan) Masao Azuma	Honda	26	+3.966	4	13
5	9	(Italy) Lucio Cecchinello	Aprilia	26	+17.386	9	11
6	16	(Italy) Simone Sanna	Aprilia	26	+23.647	15	10
7	17	(Germany) Steve Jenkner	Aprilia	26	+24.201	14	9
8	23	(Italy) Gino Borsoi	Aprilia	26	+24.422	10	8
9	31	(Spain) Ángel Rodríguez	Aprilia	26	+28.039	28	7
10	28	(Hungary) Gábor Talmácsi	Honda	26	+28.612	22	6
11	6	(Italy) Mirko Giansanti	Honda	26	+28.620	16	5
12	26	(Spain) Daniel Pedrosa	Honda	26	+33.089	26	4
13	18	(Czech Republic) Jakub Smrž	Honda	26	+36.125	20	3
14	25	(Spain) Joan Olivé	Honda	26	+36.583	24	2
15	11	(Italy) Max Sabbatani	Aprilia	26	+36.948	19	1
16	20	(Italy) Gaspare Caffiero	Aprilia	26	+43.849	23	
17	73	(Australia) Casey Stoner	Honda	26	+50.842	18	
18	21	(France) Arnaud Vincent	Honda	26	+1:01.114	17	
19	34	(Andorra) Eric Bataille	Honda	26	+1:06.140	21	
20	27	(Italy) Marco Petrini	Honda	26	+1:11.505	25	
21	77	(Spain) Adrián Araujo	Honda	26	+1:32.712	32	
22	12	(Spain) Raúl Jara	Aprilia	26	+1:33.146	30	
23	5	(Japan) Noboru Ueda	TSR-Honda	25	+1 lap	8	
Ret	7	(Italy) Stefano Perugini	Italjet	16	Retirement	5	
Ret	72	(United Kingdom) Chris Martin	Honda	13	Retirement	29	
Ret	15	(San Marino) Alex de Angelis	Honda	11	Accident	13	
Ret	29	(Spain) Ángel Nieto Jr.	Honda	11	Accident	12	
Ret	71	(United Kingdom) Paul Robinson	Honda	10	Retirement	31	
Ret	8	(Italy) Gianluigi Scalvini	Italjet	9	Retirement	11	
Ret	19	(Italy) Alessandro Brannetti	Aprilia	6	Accident	27	
Ret	22	(Spain) Pablo Nieto	Derbi	5	Accident	7	
Ret	39	(Czech Republic) Jaroslav Huleš	Honda	1	Accident	6	
DNS	10	(Germany) Jarno Müller	Honda		Did not start		
WD	74	(United Kingdom) Sam Owens	Honda		Withdrew		

== Championship standings after the race (500cc) ==
Below are the standings for the top five riders and constructors after round eight has concluded.

Riders' Championship standings

Pos.	Rider	Points
1	(Italy) Valentino Rossi	161
2	(Italy) Max Biaggi	135
3	(Italy) Loris Capirossi	103
4	(Brazil) Alex Barros	89
5	(Japan) Shinya Nakano	84

Constructors' Championship standings

Pos.	Constructor	Points
1	(Japan) Honda	186
2	(Japan) Yamaha	159
3	(Japan) Suzuki	76
4	(Malaysia) Proton KR	41
5	(New Zealand) Pulse	3

- Note: Only the top five positions are included for both sets of standings.

Previous race: 2001 Dutch TT	FIM Grand Prix World Championship; 2001 season	Next race: 2001 German Grand Prix
Previous race: 2000 British Grand Prix	British Grand Prix	Next race: 2002 British Grand Prix
