= Chris Walker (motorcyclist) =

British motorcycle racer (born 1972)

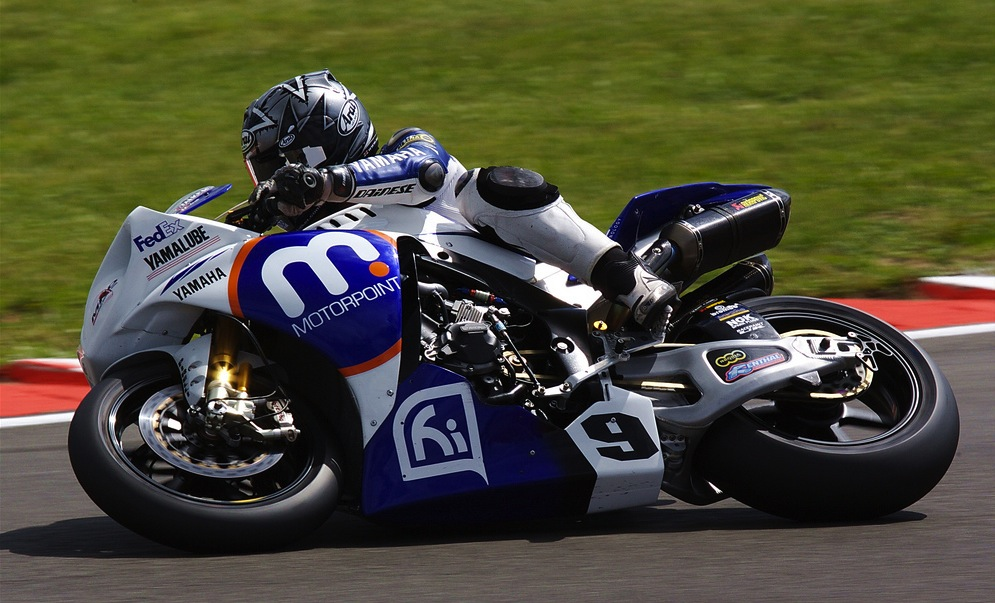
- Walker riding the Motorpoint/Henderson Yamaha during the 2009 British Superbike Championship at Snetterton
- Nationality: English
- Born: 25 March 1972 (age 54); Nottingham, Nottinghamshire, East Midlands
Motorcycle racing career statistics
Superbike World Championship
Active years	2002–2008
Manufacturers	Kawasaki, Ducati, Petronas, Honda
Championships	0
2008 championship position	31st
Starts / Wins / Podiums / Poles / F. laps / Points; 125 / 1 / 9 / 0 / 0 / 837

Chris Walker (born 25 March 1972) is a British former motorcycle road racer and former scrambler with the nickname The Stalker. He is a four-time runner-up in the British Superbike Championship, a three-time winner at the Mallory Park Race of the Year and a former race winner in the Superbike World Championship.

For the 2015 season, Walker signed for Tommy Hill's Be Wiser Kawasaki Team aboard a Kawasaki ZX-10R in the British Superbike Championship, following his 2014 season with Lloyds British GBmoto squad. Team manager Hill left in August, 2015, and the team folded in September, leaving Walker without a ride for the final two race meetings of the season.

In early 2016, Walker announced he would no longer participate in superbikes, instead switching to the British Sidecar Championship, initially with a two-year contract. With no previous experience, Walker stated he was excited by the future opportunities.

Like Formula One legend Ayrton Senna, Walker developed Bell's Palsy in 2002 which paralysed part of his face. He lists his determination as his best feature, and his love of puddings as his worst. He usually races #9.

== Career ==
=== Early years and British Superbike Championship (1995–2000) ===
Walker only started road racing in 1995 after many years as an accomplished motocross rider, but by the end of that year and into 1996, he rose through the ranks with ease and had ridden in Grands Prix and scored points.

In 1997, Walker challenged for the prestigious British Superbike championship with Yamaha, finishing as runner-up to experienced team-mate Niall Mackenzie. He switched to Kawasaki for 1998, winning in the season's first race, before it became clear that the Yamahas of Mackenzie and Steve Hislop were the bikes to beat. Injury to Hislop allowed Walker to take second in the series again, a feat he repeated behind Troy Bayliss’ Ducati in 1999.

Walker came agonisingly close to the 2000 title, when an engine failure in his Suzuki took him out of a winning position with just three laps remaining of the final race at Donington Park, leaving Walker in tears and gifting the title to GSE Ducati’s Neil Hodgson. He did however take a second place at Brands Hatch in the World Superbike round that year, the best of his many wild card entries in the UK rounds (and occasionally Assen in the Netherlands) over the years.

=== 500cc World Championship and World Superbike (2001–2006) ===
Walker made an attempt at the 500cc World Championship in 2001. He predicted that "For me it's going to be the toughest year ever", which proved accurate, as the factory Shell-sponsored Honda was hard to ride and forced Walker to override, resulting in many huge crashes. In 2002, he moved to the Superbike World Championship, initially with the Fuchs Kawasaki team.

Walker placed sixth in the championship for GSE Ducati in 2003, and 11th for Carl Fogarty's Foggy Petronas team in 2004, respectively teamed with James Toseland and Troy Corser (both of whom won the title the next season, Toseland riding the 2004 Fila Ducati to success and Corser the Alstare Suzuki in 2005).

In 2005, Walker joined the PSG-1 Kawasaki Corse team, proving to be the most consistent Kawasaki rider in terms of pace and results, securing one podium finish (3rd place, round 6 at Valencia) and finishing seventh place overall.

2006 saw Walker teamed up with Frenchman Régis Laconi and Spain's Fonsi Nieto on a Kawasaki Europe backed ZX-10R for PSG. Walker secured his maiden Superbike World Championship race win on 3 September 2006 in Race 1 at Assen, Netherlands in his 131st race. Starting the race in 13th position, and dropping to 26th position at the first corner following an excursion onto the grass, Walker braved the torrential rain and a high rate of attrition to win in a time of 44 minutes, 23.501 seconds. He came ninth overall in the championship, 19 points ahead of Nieto as the highest Kawasaki.

Despite his finishing position, Walker was subsequently dropped by PSG for the 2007 season, while Kawasaki still supported PSG as an official factory team.

=== Return to British Superbike (2007) ===
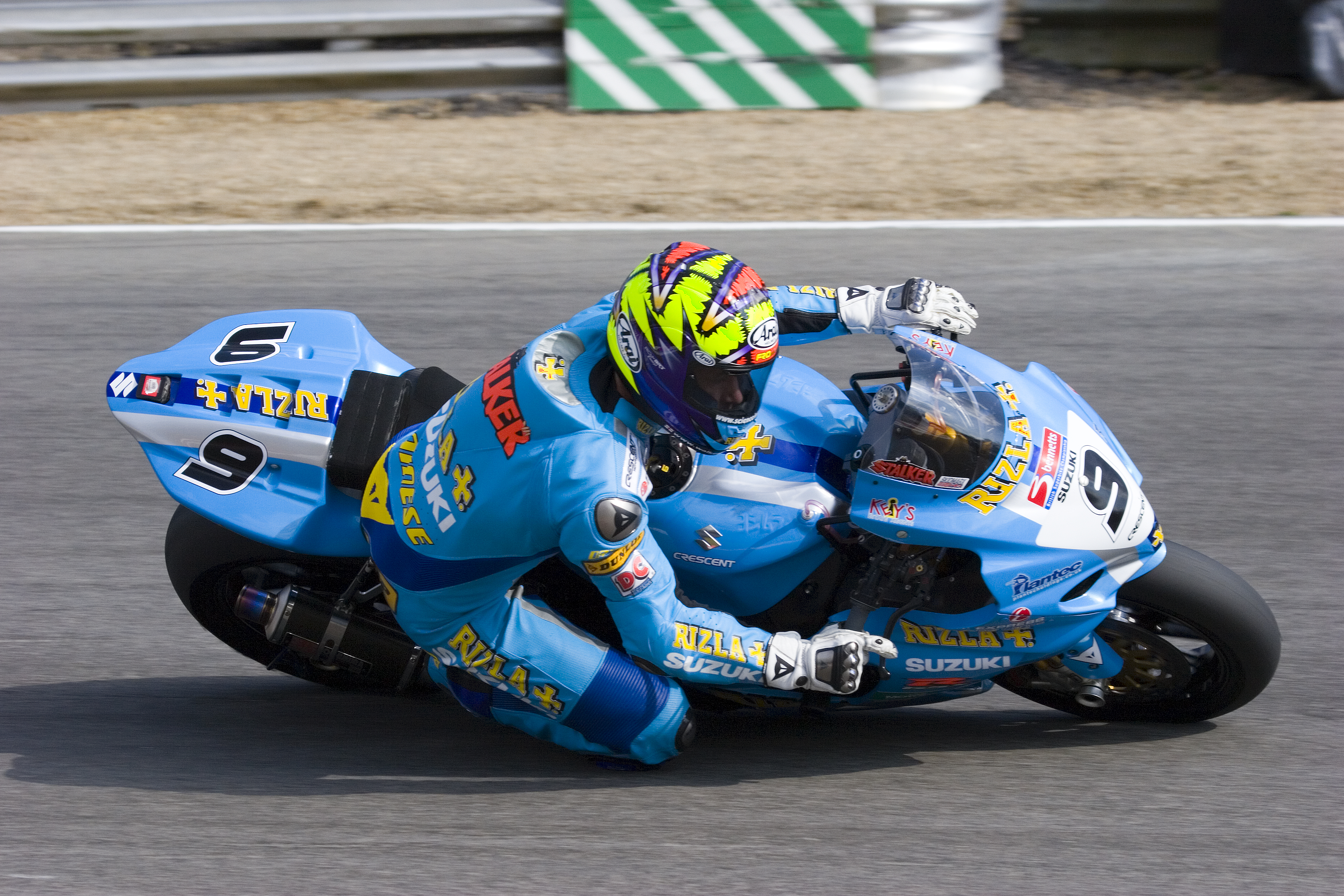
Walker at Brands Hatch in 2007.

Walker initially struggled on the Rizla Suzuki in the British Superbike championship, occasionally outpaced by rookie team-mate Cal Crutchlow. When Neil Hodgson tested the bike some speculated that Walker's ride was under threat. The team insisted it wasn't, and at Oulton Park, he took third in race one, in tricky conditions which saw many top riders (such as Jonathan Rea, Gregorio Lavilla and Tom Sykes) crash out. This was only his second podium of the season. His points tally for the year was 225, comparing favourably to his team-mate's 152.

=== World Supersport (2008) ===
Walker was not retained for 2008, but raced in the Supersport World Championship for the very first time in and 2008, for the GIL Kawasaki team alongside teammate Katsuaki Fujiwara. However, the bike was not competitive, and he switched to the Paul Bird VK Vent-Axia team in World Superbikes for the final five rounds of the season. He opened with minor points at Brands Hatch, but crashed twice at Donington Park.

=== British Superbike Championship (2009–2015) ===
For 2009, Walker was optimistic of a top British Superbike Championship ride, as all the established good riders are gone. He ultimately joined the Henderson Yamaha team, but struggled for much of the year. He was competitive in race 1 at Mallory Park until chaos and controversy struck. He was running second when Josh Brookes lost control of his bike and catapulted race leader Simon Andrews, dropping oil from Brookes' Honda. Walker was one of five other riders who either crashed or downed their bikes to avoid crashing. The red flag was shown, but these seven riders were excluded from the results, due to an unexpected application of the rules. Brookes received a two-race ban for his mistake.

For 2010, Walker was released by the Motorpoint Henderson Yamaha. It looked like he would not be racing in 2010, but he arranged a deal with on a privately run Suzuki tuned by former BSB rider Ray Stringer just a week before the opening round. After two races, Walker was offered a ride in the MSS Kawasaki team when Simon Andrews was injured in a crash while guesting in World Superbikes. He returned to the Suzuki once Andrews was fit again, but raced for SMT Honda at Snetterton, scoring the team's best 2010 results of two sevenths and an eleventh in the process

During 2011 and 2012, Walker rode for Pr1mo Bournemouth Kawasaki, and for 2013, he rode with Quattro Plant Kawasaki.

After a season with Lloyds British GBmoto on a Kawasaki ZX-10R, Walker changed to Be Wiser Kawasaki Team for 2015, again riding a ZX-10R, for a team owned by Alan Greig, having Be Wiser Insurance as main sponsor and part-sponsored by Dickies industrial clothing.

As the oldest rider competing in British Superbikes, Walker's extensive experience with superbike machines and Kawasaki makes him ideal as lead-rider to develop the new squad, partnered by Danny Buchan, fresh from his 2014 success as Pirelli National Superstock 1000 Champion.

Former BSB rider and 2012 Champion Tommy Hill was the team-manager, making his return to racing after three years' absence developing his graphic design business. Hill left in August, 2015, and the team folded in September, leaving Walker without a ride for the final two race meetings of the season.

=== British Sidecar Championship (2016) ===
Walker competed in the 2016 British Sidecar Championship with 2012 World Sidecar Champion passenger Ashley Hawes in the chair. With over six podium finishes already this year and a 100% race finish record, Chris and Ashley lie a comfortable fourth in the championship with only four races remaining.

=== British Superbike Championship (2017) ===
According to an article by Oli Rushby on Motorcycle News.com, Walker sustained injuries during the "eight round of the 2017 MCE British Superbike Championship at Cadwell Park after a nasty crash in Friday’s Sidecar session." Rushby went on to report that "[t]he multiple BSB runner-up crashed his Kawasaki-powered Santander Salt outfit at Mansfield and was taken to hospital with suspected back injuries", before being "confirmed he sustained a break to his T4 vertebrae... as well as a broken nose."

=== Return to British Sidecar (2019) ===
Walker participated in the Hyundai Construction British Sidecar Championship with TAG Racing with the support of team-mate Tom Christie.

== Personal life ==
Walker's father John was the proprietor of John Walker Superbikes, a retail motorcycle dealership in Langley Mill, Nottingham, which also owned Fox's Kawasaki in Mapperley, Nottingham, and Wraggs Motorcycles in Mansfield.

Walker lives in Ollerton, Nottinghamshire, and also runs Chris Walker Motorcycles, a Ducati & Kawasaki dealership, in Grantham.

Walker is married to Rachel and they have a daughter, Rosie.

== Career statistics ==
=== Grand Prix motorcycle racing ===
==== Races by year ====
(key) (Races in bold indicate pole position, races in italics indicate fastest lap)

Year	Class	Bike	1	2	3	4	5	6	7	8	9	10	11	12	13	14	15	16	Pos	Pts
2001	500cc	Suzuki	JPN; Ret	RSA; 15	SPA; Ret	FRA; 12	ITA; Ret	CAT; 13	NED; DNS	GBR; 15	GER	CZE	POR	VAL	PAC	AUS	MAL	BRA	20th	9

=== British Superbike Championship ===
(key) (Races in bold indicate pole position, races in italics indicate fastest lap)

Year	Bike	1		2		3			4		5		6			7			8			9			10		11		12			13		Pos	Pts	Ref
Year	Bike	R1	R2	R1	R2	R1	R2	R3	R1	R2	R1	R2	R1	R2	R3	R1	R2	R3	R1	R2	R3	R1	R2	R3	R1	R2	R1	R2	R1	R2	R3	R1	R2	Pos	Pts	Ref
2007	Suzuki	BHGP; 5	BHGP; 8	THR; 9	THR; Ret	SIL; 3	SIL; 4		OUL; Ret	OUL; 9	SNE; 9	SNE; 9	MOP; 9	MOP; Ret		KNO; 5	KNO; 6		OUL; 3	OUL; 8		MAL; 4	MAL; 6		CRO; 8	CRO; 10	CAD; 8	CAD; 6	DON; 6	DON; 4		BHI; 7	BHI; 6	7th	225	
2009	Yamaha	BHI; 14	BHI; 8	OUL; 11	OUL; 9	DON; 5	DON; 3		THR; Ret	THR; Ret	SNE; 6	SNE; 17	KNO; 7	KNO; 5		MAL; Ret	MAL; 12		BHGP; 9	BHGP; Ret	BHGP; 12	CAD; 11	CAD; 6		CRO; Ret	CRO; 11	SIL; Ret	SIL; 11	OUL; 9	OUL; 14	OUL; 7			9th	141	
2010	Suzuki	BHI; 9	BHI; Ret	THR; Ret	THR; 15						MAL; 6	MAL; 5	KNO; 10	KNO; C																				10th	130	
2010	Kawasaki					OUL; 8	OUL; 11		CAD; 7	CAD; 8																								10th	130	
2010	Honda															SNE; 11	SNE; 7	SNE; 7	BHGP; 22	BHGP; Ret	BHGP; 13	CAD; 11	CAD; 15		CRO; 9	CRO; 12	SIL; 9	SIL; 8	OUL; 16	OUL; Ret	OUL; 9			10th	130	
2011	Kawasaki	BHI; 10	BHI; 11	OUL; 16	OUL; 11	CRO; Ret	CRO; 13		THR; 8	THR; 8	KNO; 14	KNO; 7	SNE; 8	SNE; 8		OUL; 14	OUL; C		BHGP; 5	BHGP; 15	BHGP; 15	CAD; 10	CAD; Ret	CAD; DNS	DON; Ret	DON; 9	SIL; 17	SIL; Ret	BHGP; 12	BHGP; 5	BHGP; Ret			12th	105	
2012	Kawasaki	BHI; 12	BHI; C	THR; NC	THR; 15	OUL; 7	OUL; 1	OUL; 9	SNE; 7	SNE; 7	KNO; Ret	KNO; Ret	OUL; 7	OUL; 12	OUL; 11	BHGP; 6	BHGP; DNF		CAD; 13	CAD; 11		DON; 8	DON; 10		ASS; 15	ASS; 14	SIL; 10	SIL; 8	BHGP; DNF	BHGP; DNF	BHGP; 9			9th	138	
2013	Kawasaki	BHI; 7	BHI; 8	THR; Ret	THR; 7	OUL; 9	OUL; 6		KNO; 5	KNO; 5	SNE; Ret	SNE; 6	BHGP; Ret	BHGP; Ret		OUL; 9	OUL; Ret	OUL; 12	CAD; 6	CAD; 6		DON; 7	DON; 8		ASS; NC	ASS; 6	SIL; 13	SIL; 11	BHGP; 7	BHGP; 5	BHGP; 9			10th	168	
2014	Kawasaki	BHI; 2	BHI; 5	OUL; Ret	OUL; 8	SNE; 6	SNE; Ret		KNO; 5	KNO; 3	BHGP; 4	BHGP; 9	THR; 7	THR; 5		OUL; Ret	OUL; 5	OUL; 7	CAD; 3	CAD; 8		DON; 11	DON; 10		ASS; 16	ASS; Ret	SIL; 12	SIL; 12	BHGP; 10	BHGP; Ret	BHGP; 10			6th	525	
2015	Kawasaki	DON; 8	DON; 10	BHI; 10	BHI; 13	OUL; 11	OUL; 9		SNE; 6	SNE; Ret	KNO; DNS	KNO; DNS	BHGP; Ret	BHGP; Ret		THR; 15	THR; 12		CAD; Ret	CAD; 15	OUL; 11	OUL; 13	OUL; 16		ASS; 17	ASS; 8	SIL	SIL	BHGP	BHGP	BHGP			18th	67	

=== Superbike World Championship ===
(key) (Races in bold indicate pole position, races in italics indicate fastest lap)

Year	Make	1		2		3		4		5		6		7		8		9		10		11		12		13		14		Pos	Pts	Ref
Year	Make	R1	R2	R1	R2	R1	R2	R1	R2	R1	R2	R1	R2	R1	R2	R1	R2	R1	R2	R1	R2	R1	R2	R1	R2	R1	R2	R1	R2	Pos	Pts	Ref
2002	Kawasaki	ESP; 10	ESP; 7	AUS; 9	AUS; 9	RSA; 8	RSA; 9	JPN; 11	JPN; 13	ITA; Ret	ITA; 10	GBR; 14	GBR; 4	GER; DNS	GER; 9	SMR; 7	SMR; 8	USA; 11	USA; 10	GBR; 6	GBR; 8	GER; 9	GER; 15	NED; Ret	NED; 7	ITA; 11	ITA; 12			9th	152	
2003	Ducati	ESP; 3	ESP; 4	AUS; 7	AUS; 6	JPN; Ret	JPN; Ret	ITA; 6	ITA; 6	GER; 5	GER; 3	GBR; 9	GBR; 8	SMR; 5	SMR; 8	USA; 5	USA; 3	GBR; 3	GBR; Ret	NED; 5	NED; 8	ITA; Ret	ITA; 5	FRA; 3	FRA; 3					6th	234	
2004	Petronas	ESP; 3	ESP; 7	AUS; 10	AUS; 8	SMR; 6	SMR; 13	ITA; 8	ITA; 7	GER; Ret	GER; 7	GBR; Ret	GBR; 12	USA; Ret	USA; Ret	GBR; 9	GBR; 4	NED; 12	NED; 10	ITA; Ret	ITA; 16	FRA; 8	FRA; 8							11th	128	
2005	Kawasaki	QAT; 14	QAT; Ret	AUS; 9	AUS; Ret	ESP; 4	ESP; 3	ITA; 8	ITA; 8	EUR; 6	EUR; 6	SMR; 8	SMR; 11	CZE; 4	CZE; 10	GBR; 5	GBR; 4	NED; Ret	NED; DNS	GER	GER	ITA; 6	ITA; C	FRA; 7	FRA; 5					7th	160	
2006	Kawasaki	QAT; Ret	QAT; 16	AUS; 10	AUS; 10	ESP; 23	ESP; 7	ITA; 11	ITA; 9	EUR; 6	EUR; 8	SMR; Ret	SMR; 4	CZE; 7	CZE; 10	GBR; 7	GBR; 8	NED; 1	NED; 14	GER; 11	GER; 10	ITA; 12	ITA; 14	FRA; 6	FRA; 8					9th	158	
2008	Honda	QAT	QAT	AUS	AUS	EUR	EUR	ESP	ESP	NED	NED	ITA	ITA	GBR	GBR	SMR	SMR	CZE	CZE	GBR; 15	GBR; 15	GER; Ret	GER; Ret	ITA; 18	ITA; 15	FRA; 15	FRA; 15	POR; 17	POR; 19	31st	5	

=== Supersport World Championship ===
(key) (Races in bold indicate pole position, races in italics indicate fastest lap)

Year	Make	1	2	3	4	5	6	7	8	9	10	11	12	13	Pos	Pts	Ref
2008	Honda	QAT; 9	AUS; 14	SPA; 9	NED; 12	ITA; Ret	GER; 9	SMR; 12	CZE; 11	GBR	EUR	ITA	FRA	POR	16th	36	

== Bibliography ==
- Walker, Chris (2007). Stalker!: The Autobiography. HarperSport. ISBN 978-0007259854.
