= Luca Boscoscuro =

Italian motorcycle racer (born 1971)

- Nationality: Italian
- Born: 27 December 1971 (age 54); Schio, Italy
Motorcycle racing career statistics
Grand Prix motorcycle racing
Active years	1995 – 2001
First race	1995 250cc Nations Grand Prix
Last race	2001 250cc Brazilian Grand Prix
Starts / Wins / Podiums / Poles / F. laps / Points; 91 / 0 / 0 / 0 / 0 / 95

Luca Boscoscuro (born 27 December 1971 in Schio) is an Italian former road racer at Grand Prix level. He was the 1995 250 cc European Champion. His best year in the world championships was in 1996, when he finished in tenth place in the 250cc class and won the IRTA CUP (World Championship for Private Team).

After a career as a professional rider, Boscoscuro remains within the racing community and, in 2002 he became Gilera and Derbi Sport Director and from 2006 to 2009 Gilera team manager, where in 2008 he won the title of 250cc with Marco Simoncelli.

== Speed Up project ==
Since 2010, the new project was with newly founded Speed Up team. 2010 also marked a radical rule change with the transition from two-stroke 250cc to four-stroke 600cc. He debuted in the World Championship of the newborn Moto2 class with the Speed Up S10 with which he won six pole positions, three races, and went to the podium nine times. His team was the only one that placed both riders on the podium at the same race.

In 2011, after an agreement with another frame supplier, Boscoscuro only went to the podium twice throughout the season.

In 2012, Boscoscuro joined forces with Eros Braconi founding the Speed Up Factory: the new S12 chassis is entirely made in Italy, from design to manufacturing.

In 2013, Boscoscuro continued the evolution of the prototype and three are the teams NGM Mobile Forward Racing, QMMF Racing Team and Arginano y Gines Racing Team, that choose the product of the Italian Factory, eight riders will participate with a SF13 to the World Championship Moto2 category.

== Grand Prix results by year ==
(key) (Races in bold indicate pole position; races in italics indicate fastest lap)

Year	Class	Bike	1	2	3	4	5	6	7	8	9	10	11	12	13	14	15	16	Pos	Pts
1995	250cc	Aprilia	AUS	MAL	JPN	SPA	GER	ITA; 20	NED	FRA	GBR	CZE	BRA	ARG	EUR				NC	0
1996	250cc	Aprilia	MAL; 9	INA; 13	JPN; 21	SPA; 10	ITA; 13	FRA; 6	NED; 12	GER; 6	GBR; Ret	AUT; 7	CZE; 15	IMO; 14	CAT; 18	BRA; 9	AUS; Ret		10th	62
1997	250cc	Honda	MAL; 15	JPN; 19	SPA; 15	ITA; 12	AUT; Ret	FRA	NED; Ret	IMO; Ret	GER; 14	BRA; 13	GBR; Ret	CZE; Ret	CAT; 17	INA; 15	AUS; 15		24th	13
1998	250cc	TSR-Honda	JPN; 18	MAL; Ret	SPA; 11	ITA; 10	FRA; Ret	MAD; Ret	NED; 9	GBR; DNS	GER; 8	CZE; 9	IMO; 7	CAT; 12	AUS; 10	ARG; 10			14th	58
1999	250cc	TSR-Honda	MAL; 11	JPN; Ret	SPA; 10	FRA; 14	ITA; 10	CAT; 10	NED; 16	GBR; 10	GER; 10	CZE; 13	IMO; 11	VAL; 11	AUS; 14	RSA; 8	BRA; 10	ARG; Ret	13th	66
2000	250cc	Aprilia	RSA; Ret	MAL; 7	JPN; 11	SPA; 11	FRA; 9	ITA; Ret	CAT; Ret	NED; 22	GBR; Ret	GER; 15	CZE; 15	POR; 14	VAL; 12	BRA; 10	PAC; 13	AUS; 15	13th	45
2001	250cc	Aprilia	JPN; Ret	RSA; Ret	SPA; Ret	FRA; 17	ITA; Ret	CAT; 17	NED; 7	GBR; 15	GER; Ret	CZE; 17	POR; 18	VAL; Ret	PAC; Ret	AUS; 8	MAL; 13	BRA; 18	21st	21
