= Shahrol Yuzy =

Malaysian motorcycle racer (born 1976)

- Nationality: Malaysian
- Born: 23 January 1976 (age 50); Teluk Intan, Perak
Motorcycle racing career statistics
Grand Prix motorcycle racing
Active years	1996–2002
First race	1996 Malaysian 250cc Grand Prix
Last race	2002 250cc Valencian Grand Prix
Starts / Wins / Podiums / Poles / F. laps / Points; 55 / 0 / 0 / 0 / 0 / 127

Shahrol Yuzy Ahmad Zaini (born 23 January 1976 in Teluk Intan, Perak) is a motorcycle Grand Prix rider from Malaysia. After his retirement from motorcycle racing at the end of 2002, he served as a full-time mentor of Team Petronas Sprinta Racing for the Malaysian Cub Prix from 2003 to 2007 before moving to Team Modenas Yuzy Pachi in 2008 as team principal. He still runs as team principal for Yuzy Honda Racing, which actively races in both the Malaysian Cub Prix and Asia Road Racing Championship. His son, Syahrol Syazras is also a motorcycle racer which he is racing with his father's team in both Malaysian Cub Prix and Asia Road Racing Championship.

== Career highlights ==
- FIM Asian Road Racing championship
- FIM Spanish Championship
- FIM European Road Racing championship
- FIM World Motorcycle Championship 2002, class 250cc

== Career statistics ==
=== By season ===
Season	Class	Motorcycle	Team	Number	Race	Win	Pod	Pole	FLap	Pts	Plcd
1996	250cc	Yamaha	Petronas Sprinta Team TVK	57	1	0	0	0	0	0	NC
1997	125cc	Honda	Petronas Sprinta Team TVK		3	0	0	0	0	0	NC
1998	250cc	Honda	Petronas Sprinta Team TVK	56	1	0	0	0	0	0	NC
1999	250cc	Honda	Petronas Sprinta Team TVK	63	2	0	0	0	0	0	NC
2000	250cc	Yamaha	Petronas Sprinta Team TVK	18	16	0	0	0	0	25	18th
2001	250cc	Yamaha	Petronas Sprinta Team TVK	18	16	0	0	0	0	44	15th
2002	250cc	Yamaha	Petronas Sprinta Team TVK	18	16	0	0	0	0	58	15th
Total					**55**	**0**	**0**	**0**	**0**	**127**	

=== Races by year ===
(key) (Races in bold indicate pole position, races in italics indicate fastest lap)

Year	Class	Bike	1	2	3	4	5	6	7	8	9	10	11	12	13	14	15	16	Pos.	Pts
1996	250cc	Yamaha	MAL; 16	INA	JPN	SPA	ITA	FRA	NED	GER	GBR	AUT	CZE	IMO	CAT	BRA	AUS		NC	0
1997	125cc	Honda	MAL; Ret	JPN	SPA	ITA	AUT	FRA	NED	IMO	GER	BRA	GBR	CZE	CAT	INA; 18	AUS; 19		NC	0
1998	250cc	Honda	JPN	MAL; 17	SPA	ITA	FRA	MAD	NED	GBR	GER	CZE	IMO	CAT	AUS	ARG			NC	0
1999	250cc	Honda	MAL; Ret	JPN	SPA; 20	FRA	ITA	CAT	NED	GBR	GER	CZE	IMO	VAL	AUS	RSA	BRA	ARG	NC	0
2000	250cc	Yamaha	RSA; Ret	MAL; 18	JPN; 19	SPA; Ret	FRA; 13	ITA; 11	CAT; 20	NED; Ret	GBR; Ret	GER; 18	CZE; 12	POR; 10	VAL; 14	BRA; Ret	PAC; 11	AUS; 19	18th	25
2001	250cc	Yamaha	JPN; Ret	RSA; 11	SPA; Ret	FRA; 15	ITA; 9	CAT; 12	NED; 26	GBR; 10	GER; 11	CZE; Ret	POR; 10	VAL; 12	PAC; 19	AUS; 10	MAL; Ret	BRA; 23	15th	44
2002	250cc	Yamaha	JPN; Ret	RSA; Ret	SPA; 13	FRA; 13	ITA; 9	CAT; 8	NED; 10	GBR; 10	GER; 11	CZE; Ret	POR; Ret	BRA; 9	PAC; 18	MAL; 9	AUS; 15	VAL; 11	15th	58
