= 2001 Japanese motorcycle Grand Prix =

(Japan) 2001 Japanese Grand Prix
Race details
- Race 1 of 16 races in the 2001 Grand Prix motorcycle racing season
- Date: 8 April 2001
- Official name: Grand Prix of Japan
- Location: Suzuka Circuit
- Course: Permanent racing facility; 5.859 km (3.641 mi)

500cc
Pole position
- Rider: (Italy) Loris Capirossi
- Time: 2:04.777
Fastest lap
- Rider: (Japan) Tohru Ukawa
- Time: 2:06.805 on lap 11
Podium
- First: (Italy) Valentino Rossi
- Second: (Australia) Garry McCoy
- Third: (Italy) Max Biaggi

250cc
Pole position
- Rider: (Japan) Daijiro Kato
- Time: 2:07.414
Fastest lap
- Rider: (Japan) Daijiro Kato
- Time: 2:08.658 on lap 7
Podium
- First: (Japan) Daijiro Kato
- Second: (Japan) Tetsuya Harada
- Third: (Italy) Roberto Locatelli

125cc
Pole position
- Rider: (Japan) Youichi Ui
- Time: 2:14.686
Fastest lap
- Rider: (Japan) Masao Azuma
- Time: 2:15.353 on lap 14
Podium
- First: (Japan) Masao Azuma
- Second: (Japan) Youichi Ui
- Third: (Italy) Simone Sanna

The 2001 Japanese motorcycle Grand Prix was the first round of the 2001 Grand Prix motorcycle racing season. It took place on the weekend of 6–8 April 2001 at the Suzuka Circuit.

== 500 cc classification ==
Pos.	No.	Rider	Team	Manufacturer	Laps	Time/Retired	Grid	Points
1	46	(Italy) Valentino Rossi	Nastro Azzurro Honda	Honda	21	44:51.501	7	25
2	5	(Australia) Garry McCoy	Red Bull Yamaha WCM	Yamaha	21	+0.724	4	20
3	3	(Italy) Max Biaggi	Marlboro Yamaha Team	Yamaha	21	+0.956	3	16
4	6	(Japan) Norifumi Abe	Antena 3 Yamaha d'Antin	Yamaha	21	+1.176	6	13
5	56	(Japan) Shinya Nakano	Gauloises Yamaha Tech 3	Yamaha	21	+3.256	2	11
6	4	(Brazil) Alex Barros	West Honda Pons	Honda	21	+14.515	8	10
7	1	(United States) Kenny Roberts Jr.	Telefónica Movistar Suzuki	Suzuki	21	+22.876	9	9
8	65	(Italy) Loris Capirossi	West Honda Pons	Honda	21	+28.732	1	8
9	28	(Spain) Àlex Crivillé	Repsol YPF Honda Team	Honda	21	+34.478	11	7
10	7	(Spain) Carlos Checa	Marlboro Yamaha Team	Yamaha	21	+53.765	12	6
11	17	(Netherlands) Jurgen van den Goorbergh	Proton Team KR	Proton KR	21	+58.688	16	5
12	12	(Japan) Haruchika Aoki	Arie Molenaar Racing	Honda	21	+1:17.338	17	4
13	9	(United Kingdom) Leon Haslam	Shell Advance Honda	Honda	21	+1:17.681	20	3
Ret	24	(United Kingdom) Jason Vincent	Pulse GP	Pulse	19	Retirement	21	
Ret	11	(Japan) Tohru Ukawa	Repsol YPF Honda Team	Honda	16	Accident	5	
Ret	68	(Australia) Mark Willis	Pulse GP	Pulse	15	Retirement	23	
Ret	33	(Japan) Akira Ryō	Telefónica Movistar Suzuki	Suzuki	12	Accident	15	
Ret	19	(France) Olivier Jacque	Gauloises Yamaha Tech 3	Yamaha	11	Retirement	19	
Ret	41	(Japan) Noriyuki Haga	Red Bull Yamaha WCM	Yamaha	10	Accident	10	
Ret	15	(Spain) Sete Gibernau	Telefónica Movistar Suzuki	Suzuki	8	Accident	14	
Ret	21	(Netherlands) Barry Veneman	Dee Cee Jeans Racing Team	Honda	5	Retirement	24	
Ret	16	(Sweden) Johan Stigefelt	Sabre Sport	Sabre V4	3	Retirement	22	
Ret	10	(Spain) José Luis Cardoso	Antena 3 Yamaha d'Antin	Yamaha	0	Accident	13	
Ret	8	(United Kingdom) Chris Walker	Shell Advance Honda	Honda	0	Accident	18	
DNQ	14	(Australia) Marcus Payten	Dee Cee Jeans Racing Team	Honda		Did not qualify		

== 250 cc classification ==
Pos.	No.	Rider	Manufacturer	Laps	Time/Retired	Grid	Points
1	74	(Japan) Daijiro Kato	Honda	19	41:03.596	1	25
2	31	(Japan) Tetsuya Harada	Aprilia	19	+18.763	8	20
3	15	(Italy) Roberto Locatelli	Aprilia	19	+18.835	3	13
4	8	(Japan) Naoki Matsudo	Yamaha	19	+23.135	7	13
5	44	(Italy) Roberto Rolfo	Aprilia	19	+24.423	9	11
6	5	(Italy) Marco Melandri	Aprilia	19	+26.595	2	10
7	21	(Italy) Franco Battaini	Aprilia	19	+31.142	6	9
8	99	(United Kingdom) Jeremy McWilliams	Aprilia	19	+43.953	5	8
9	9	(Argentina) Sebastián Porto	Yamaha	19	+45.887	11	7
10	46	(Japan) Taro Sekiguchi	Yamaha	19	+48.496	15	6
11	10	(Spain) Fonsi Nieto	Aprilia	19	+53.583	12	5
12	66	(Germany) Alex Hofmann	Aprilia	19	+1:05.172	18	4
13	87	(Japan) Hiroshi Aoyama	Honda	19	+1:05.267	14	3
14	12	(Germany) Klaus Nöhles	Aprilia	19	+1:17.422	13	2
15	50	(France) Sylvain Guintoli	Aprilia	19	+1:18.183	25	1
16	42	(Spain) David Checa	Honda	19	+1:18.602	24	
17	57	(Italy) Lorenzo Lanzi	Aprilia	19	+1:26.040	26	
18	20	(Spain) Jerónimo Vidal	Aprilia	19	+1:35.868	23	
19	48	(Japan) Shinichi Nakatomi	Honda	19	+1:41.647	16	
20	47	(Japan) Tekkyu Kayoh	TSR-Honda	19	+1:43.891	27	
21	55	(Italy) Diego Giugovaz	Yamaha	19	+1:49.324	28	
22	98	(Germany) Katja Poensgen	Aprilia	18	+1 lap	30	
Ret	37	(Italy) Luca Boscoscuro	Aprilia	16	Retirement	17	
Ret	18	(Malaysia) Shahrol Yuzy	Yamaha	15	Accident	21	
Ret	22	(Spain) José David de Gea	Yamaha	14	Accident	20	
Ret	6	(Spain) Alex Debón	Aprilia	6	Accident	4	
Ret	11	(Italy) Riccardo Chiarello	Aprilia	6	Retirement	29	
Ret	45	(United Kingdom) Stuart Edwards	TSR-Honda	5	Retirement	31	
Ret	81	(France) Randy de Puniet	Aprilia	4	Retirement	10	
Ret	7	(Spain) Emilio Alzamora	Honda	1	Accident	19	
Ret	19	(France) Julien Allemand	Yamaha	0	Accident	22	
DNS	49	(Japan) Choujun Kameya	Yamaha		Did not start		
DNQ	16	(Spain) David Tomás	Honda		Did not qualify		
DNQ	23	(Brazil) César Barros	Yamaha		Did not qualify		

== 125 cc classification ==
Pos.	No.	Rider	Manufacturer	Laps	Time/Retired	Grid	Points
1	4	(Japan) Masao Azuma	Honda	18	40:59.192	4	25
2	41	(Japan) Youichi Ui	Derbi	18	+0.067	1	20
3	16	(Italy) Simone Sanna	Aprilia	18	+0.604	19	16
4	23	(Italy) Gino Borsoi	Aprilia	18	+0.898	6	13
5	54	(San Marino) Manuel Poggiali	Gilera	18	+1.151	2	11
6	9	(Italy) Lucio Cecchinello	Aprilia	18	+1.376	3	10
7	17	(Germany) Steve Jenkner	Aprilia	18	+14.173	5	9
8	6	(Italy) Mirko Giansanti	Honda	18	+14.632	16	8
9	21	(France) Arnaud Vincent	Honda	18	+15.735	18	7
10	22	(Spain) Pablo Nieto	Derbi	18	+16.333	22	6
11	29	(Spain) Ángel Nieto Jr.	Honda	18	+17.384	11	5
12	11	(Italy) Max Sabbatani	Aprilia	18	+17.992	9	4
13	8	(Italy) Gianluigi Scalvini	Italjet	18	+18.621	12	3
14	15	(San Marino) Alex de Angelis	Honda	18	+18.628	14	2
15	57	(Japan) Hiroyuki Kikuchi	Honda	18	+23.655	15	1
16	24	(Spain) Antonio Elías	Honda	18	+34.401	17	
17	39	(Czech Republic) Jaroslav Huleš	Honda	18	+34.521	13	
18	26	(Spain) Daniel Pedrosa	Honda	18	+46.838	23	
19	25	(Spain) Joan Olivé	Honda	18	+47.378	34	
20	98	(Japan) Masafumi Ono	Honda	18	+48.164	25	
21	18	(Czech Republic) Jakub Smrž	Honda	18	+58.746	26	
22	56	(Japan) Yuzo Fujioka	ERP Honda	18	+1:00.982	28	
23	28	(Hungary) Gábor Talmácsi	Honda	18	+1:01.962	31	
24	10	(Germany) Jarno Müller	Honda	18	+1:21.581	21	
25	14	(Germany) Philipp Hafeneger	Honda	18	+1:49.589	32	
Ret	55	(Japan) Hideyuki Nakajoh	Honda	15	Retirement	10	
Ret	5	(Japan) Noboru Ueda	TSR-Honda	14	Accident	7	
Ret	31	(Spain) Ángel Rodríguez	Aprilia	14	Retirement	29	
Ret	19	(Italy) Alessandro Brannetti	Aprilia	13	Retirement	30	
Ret	20	(Italy) Gaspare Caffiero	Aprilia	12	Accident	20	
Ret	34	(Andorra) Eric Bataille	Honda	11	Accident	24	
Ret	7	(Italy) Stefano Perugini	Italjet	5	Accident	8	
Ret	12	(Spain) Raúl Jara	Aprilia	0	Retirement	35	
Ret	27	(Italy) Marco Petrini	Honda	0	Accident	27	
Ret	97	(Japan) Naoki Katoh	Honda	0	Accident	33	

== Championship standings after the race (500cc) ==
Below are the standings for the top five riders and constructors after round one has concluded.

Riders' Championship standings

Pos.	Rider	Points
1	(Italy) Valentino Rossi	25
2	(Australia) Garry McCoy	20
3	(Italy) Max Biaggi	16
4	(Japan) Norifumi Abe	13
5	(Japan) Shinya Nakano	11

Constructors' Championship standings

Pos.	Constructor	Points
1	(Japan) Honda	25
2	(Japan) Yamaha	20
3	(Japan) Suzuki	9
4	(Malaysia) Proton KR	5
5	(New Zealand) Pulse	0

- Note: Only the top five positions are included for both sets of standings.

Previous race: 2000 Australian Grand Prix	FIM Grand Prix World Championship; 2001 season	Next race: 2001 South African Grand Prix
Previous race: 2000 Japanese Grand Prix	Japanese Grand Prix	Next race: 2002 Japanese Grand Prix
