= MuZ 500 =

- Manufacturer: MuZ
- Production: 1998–1999
- Class: 500 cc
- Engine: Swissauto two-stroke V4 500 cc

The MuZ 500 was a motorcycle that competed in the 1998 and 1999 500 cc Road Racing World Championship.

== MuZ 500 ==
The MuZ 500 started out as essentially the same machine as the ELF 500 ROC. The MuZ 500 competed in the 500 cc World Championship in 1998 and 1999. In its first year it remain largely unchanged, but it was 1999 that saw true progress being made with the bike.

=== 1998 ===
MuZ Roc Rennsport
Riders: Doriano Romboni, Eskil Suter, Jean-Philippe Ruggia, Luca Cadalora
The team was formed after the Malaysian group Hong Leong bought the historic motorcycle manufacturer MZ. The bike again used a Swissauto engine in a ROC frame. The team began the year with a single rider – Doriano Romboni (ITA), who scored a 12th at Suzuka in the bikes first race. At race 2 in Malaysia however he crashed, breaking his wrist, and was to miss the rest of the season. He was replaced by test rider Eskil Suter (SWI) who tried to continue development of the bike. He rode the bike to three-point-scoring positions: two 14ths and one 13th, with a best qualifying of 14th. He finished the season on 7 pts in the Championship. Jean-Philippe Ruggia (FRA) took the bike out at Assen, and qualified 15th but failed to finish the race. The MuZ didn't race at the penultimate round in Australia due to internal difficulties. The hugely experienced Luca Cadalora (ITA) raced the MuZ in the last round of the year in Argentina, having also raced for both Yamaha and Suzuki during the same year. He failed to finish the race but had qualified a respectable 9th on the grid, just a second off Mick Doohan's pole position time and the best qualifying position for the MuZ by far this season. The team finished the season 5th in the Championship on 11 pts.

=== 1999 ===
MuZ-Weber
Riders: Jurgen van den Goorbergh, Luca Cadalora, Noriyasu Numata (replacement), Simon Crafar (replacement), Bernard Garcia (replacement), Anthony Gobert (replacement)
Crew Chiefs: Andy Wuthrich, Thierry Feuz
Ex-sidecar Champion Rolf Biland took over the running of the team, now Team Biland GP1, in 1999. The MuZ also picked up sponsorship from German engine block manufacturer Weber. These weren't to be the only changes however. Frustrated with the ROC frame, the team brought their association with ROC to an end. The 1999 chassis was designed by ex-test rider Eskil Suter and manufactured by British firm Fabrication Techniques.

It was to be a year of highs and lows for the MuZ as Cadalora skipped Rd 2, the Japanese GP. Noriyasu Numata (JPN) was drafted in to ride his bike and although qualified second last, finished a creditable 13th in the race. Cadalora returned for Rd 3 and over the course of the next few races the bike was clearly improving. Both riders were regularly qualifying in the top 10, and at the Catalunya GP, van den Goorbergh gave the bike its first pole position, by nearly 0.3 seconds from Max Biaggi. He would later claim a second pole, this time at Brno, just ahead of Àlex Crivillé. Cadalora's best qualifying was 3rd but neither rider was able to carry this success into the races, with both riders best finish being 8th . While van den Goorbergh may have kept team morale up with his qualifying success, Cadalora was clearly suffering from a severe lack of motivation. He again skipped a race – Donington – and was replaced by Simon Crafar (NZ) who came in 10th. Cadalora then returned for the German GP and then left again for the final time. He was initially replaced by Bernard Garcia (SPA) for two rounds, who in turn was replaced by Anthony Gobert (AUS) for the final four rounds. Both Gobert and van den Goorbergh qualified inside the top 10 at the penultimate round, the Brazilian GP, but again neither rider could replicate their qualifying pace on race day.

The MuZ-Weber finished, as in the previous year, 5th in the Championship but with a much more credible tally of 64 pts. It had achieved 6 top ten placings, 2 pole positions and 2 lap records. The bike had also showed potential for impressive top speed even when compared to the factory Hondas, but its power delivery was harsh in comparison, making it more difficult to ride. The team had hoped that Cadalora would prove to be the established and experienced development rider they needed, but the on-off relationship Cadalora had with the team and the resulting one-off replacement riders filling his absence did not help the development or profile of the MuZ. Due to financial pressures, and with no sponsor for the following season the MuZ team ceased GP competition at the end of 1999, but the bikes themselves were to re-appear on the grid in 2001 in the guise of the Pulse 500.

== Specifications ==
MuZ 500 Specifications
Engine Type:	2-stroke water-cooled V4
Displacement:	499.27 cc
Max Power:	200 BHP @ 12500 rpm
Carburation Type:	4 Mikuni carbs
Ignition:	CDI digital
Clutch:	Dry multiple discs
Transmission:	6-speed cassette type
Final Drive:	Chain
Frame Type:	Twin spar aluminum
Suspension:	Front: Inverted telescopic Rear: Ohlins mono shock
Tyres:	Michelin
Wheel:	Front: 3.5 x 17 inches Rear: 6.0 x 17 inches
Brake System:	Front: Carbon composite disc (320 mm), Nissin 4 pot calipers Rear: steel disc (220 mm)
Overall Length:	2040 mm
Overall Width:	490 mm
Wheelbase:	1410 mm
Weight:	129 kg (without tank)
Fuel Tank:	35L
