= 2001 Spanish motorcycle Grand Prix =

(Spain) 2001 Spanish Grand Prix
Race details
- Race 3 of 16 races in the 2001 Grand Prix motorcycle racing season
- Date: 6 May 2001
- Official name: Gran Premio Marlboro de España
- Location: Circuito de Jerez
- Course: Permanent racing facility; 4.423 km (2.748 mi)

500cc
Pole position
- Rider: (Italy) Valentino Rossi
- Time: 1:42.739
Fastest lap
- Rider: (Italy) Valentino Rossi
- Time: 1:43.779 on lap 22
Podium
- First: (Italy) Valentino Rossi
- Second: (Japan) Norick Abe
- Third: (Spain) Àlex Crivillé

250cc
Pole position
- Rider: (Japan) Daijiro Kato
- Time: 1:43.959
Fastest lap
- Rider: (Japan) Daijiro Kato
- Time: 1:44.444 on lap 18
Podium
- First: (Japan) Daijiro Kato
- Second: (Japan) Tetsuya Harada
- Third: (Italy) Marco Melandri

125cc
Pole position
- Rider: (Japan) Youichi Ui
- Time: 1:48.002
Fastest lap
- Rider: (Japan) Masao Azuma
- Time: 1:48.385 on lap 4
Podium
- First: (Japan) Masao Azuma
- Second: (Italy) Lucio Cecchinello
- Third: (Italy) Gino Borsoi

The 2001 Spanish motorcycle Grand Prix was the third round of the 2001 Grand Prix motorcycle racing season. It took place on the weekend of 4–6 May 2001 at the Circuito de Jerez. In the 500cc race, the 2nd place for Norick Abe was the final podium in his premier class career.

== 500 cc classification ==
Pos.	No.	Rider	Team	Manufacturer	Laps	Time/Retired	Grid	Points
1	46	(Italy) Valentino Rossi	Nastro Azzurro Honda	Honda	27	47:15.126	1	25
2	6	(Japan) Norick Abe	Antena 3 Yamaha d'Antin	Yamaha	27	+2.307	3	20
3	28	(Spain) Àlex Crivillé	Repsol YPF Honda Team	Honda	27	+2.845	12	16
4	56	(Japan) Shinya Nakano	Gauloises Yamaha Tech 3	Yamaha	27	+4.157	4	13
5	11	(Japan) Tohru Ukawa	Repsol YPF Honda Team	Honda	27	+5.932	6	11
6	4	(Brazil) Alex Barros	West Honda Pons	Honda	27	+7.577	7	10
7	1	(United States) Kenny Roberts Jr.	Telefónica Movistar Suzuki	Suzuki	27	+14.459	8	9
8	65	(Italy) Loris Capirossi	West Honda Pons	Honda	27	+18.970	2	8
9	5	(Australia) Garry McCoy	Red Bull Yamaha WCM	Yamaha	27	+19.725	11	7
10	15	(Spain) Sete Gibernau	Telefónica Movistar Suzuki	Suzuki	27	+20.239	14	6
11	3	(Italy) Max Biaggi	Marlboro Yamaha Team	Yamaha	27	+20.621	5	5
12	41	(Japan) Noriyuki Haga	Red Bull Yamaha WCM	Yamaha	27	+29.891	10	4
13	17	(Netherlands) Jurgen van den Goorbergh	Proton Team KR	Proton KR	27	+42.838	9	3
14	7	(Spain) Carlos Checa	Marlboro Yamaha Team	Yamaha	27	+45.530	13	2
15	14	(Australia) Anthony West	Dee Cee Jeans Racing Team	Honda	27	+45.848	19	1
16	9	(United Kingdom) Leon Haslam	Shell Advance Honda	Honda	27	+1:02.358	16	
17	16	(Sweden) Johan Stigefelt	Sabre Sport	Sabre V4	27	+1:13.081	18	
18	24	(United Kingdom) Jason Vincent	Pulse GP	Pulse	27	+1:23.194	20	
19	68	(Australia) Mark Willis	Pulse GP	Pulse	26	+1 lap	22	
Ret	8	(United Kingdom) Chris Walker	Shell Advance Honda	Honda	5	Accident	17	
Ret	10	(Spain) José Luis Cardoso	Antena 3 Yamaha d'Antin	Yamaha	4	Retirement	15	
Ret	21	(Netherlands) Barry Veneman	Dee Cee Jeans Racing Team	Honda	3	Accident	21	
DNS	19	(France) Olivier Jacque	Gauloises Yamaha Tech 3	Yamaha		Did not start		
DNS	12	(Japan) Haruchika Aoki	Arie Molenaar Racing	Honda		Did not start		
DNQ	26	(Slovakia) Vladimír Častka	Slovnaft Paton Grand Prix	Paton		Did not qualify		

== 250 cc classification ==
Pos.	No.	Rider	Manufacturer	Laps	Time/Retired	Grid	Points
1	74	(Japan) Daijiro Kato	Honda	25	43:49.748	1	25
2	31	(Japan) Tetsuya Harada	Aprilia	25	+11.789	5	20
3	5	(Italy) Marco Melandri	Aprilia	25	+17.335	6	16
4	34	(Italy) Marcellino Lucchi	Aprilia	25	+17.870	2	13
5	10	(Spain) Fonsi Nieto	Aprilia	25	+23.696	4	11
6	7	(Spain) Emilio Alzamora	Honda	25	+24.979	11	10
7	44	(Italy) Roberto Rolfo	Aprilia	25	+25.757	12	9
8	15	(Italy) Roberto Locatelli	Aprilia	25	+32.201	3	8
9	21	(Italy) Franco Battaini	Aprilia	25	+39.404	9	7
10	99	(United Kingdom) Jeremy McWilliams	Aprilia	25	+39.510	8	6
11	66	(Germany) Alex Hofmann	Aprilia	25	+53.435	18	5
12	8	(Japan) Naoki Matsudo	Yamaha	25	+53.471	7	4
13	6	(Spain) Alex Debón	Aprilia	25	+1:02.113	10	3
14	12	(Germany) Klaus Nöhles	Aprilia	25	+1:02.437	14	2
15	57	(Italy) Lorenzo Lanzi	Aprilia	25	+1:07.791	24	1
16	42	(Spain) David Checa	Honda	25	+1:12.964	16	
17	20	(Spain) Jerónimo Vidal	Aprilia	25	+1:16.192	19	
18	81	(France) Randy de Puniet	Aprilia	25	+1:35.023	13	
19	19	(France) Julien Allemand	Yamaha	25	+1:35.337	23	
20	55	(Italy) Diego Giugovaz	Yamaha	25	+1:37.041	27	
21	39	(Spain) Ismael Bonilla	Honda	24	+1 lap	26	
22	38	(Spain) Álvaro Molina	Yamaha	24	+1 lap	25	
23	98	(Germany) Katja Poensgen	Aprilia	24	+1 lap	29	
24	23	(Brazil) César Barros	Yamaha	24	+1 lap	28	
25	16	(Spain) David Tomás	Honda	24	+1 lap	30	
26	45	(United Kingdom) Stuart Edwards	Honda	24	+1 lap	31	
27	41	(Spain) Dámaso Nácher	Honda	24	+1 lap	32	
Ret	22	(Spain) David de Gea	Yamaha	24	Accident	22	
Ret	18	(Malaysia) Shahrol Yuzy	Yamaha	18	Accident	15	
Ret	37	(Italy) Luca Boscoscuro	Aprilia	12	Retirement	20	
Ret	9	(Argentina) Sebastián Porto	Yamaha	7	Retirement	17	
Ret	50	(France) Sylvain Guintoli	Aprilia	5	Accident	21	

== 125 cc classification ==
Pos.	No.	Rider	Manufacturer	Laps	Time/Retired	Grid	Points
1	4	(Japan) Masao Azuma	Honda	23	42:09.849	8	25
2	9	(Italy) Lucio Cecchinello	Aprilia	23	+4.623	3	20
3	23	(Italy) Gino Borsoi	Aprilia	23	+5.753	9	16
4	5	(Japan) Noboru Ueda	TSR-Honda	23	+10.197	7	13
5	29	(Spain) Ángel Nieto Jr.	Honda	23	+10.384	20	11
6	31	(Spain) Ángel Rodríguez	Aprilia	23	+10.604	15	10
7	15	(San Marino) Alex de Angelis	Honda	23	+10.747	16	9
8	11	(Italy) Max Sabbatani	Aprilia	23	+15.231	14	8
9	39	(Czech Republic) Jaroslav Huleš	Honda	23	+15.798	23	7
10	26	(Spain) Daniel Pedrosa	Honda	23	+19.497	12	6
11	21	(France) Arnaud Vincent	Honda	23	+24.705	18	5
12	7	(Italy) Stefano Perugini	Italjet	23	+27.712	4	4
13	24	(Spain) Toni Elías	Honda	23	+28.109	6	3
14	25	(Spain) Joan Olivé	Honda	23	+28.221	25	2
15	18	(Czech Republic) Jakub Smrž	Honda	23	+28.969	26	1
16	44	(Spain) Héctor Faubel	Aprilia	23	+33.743	24	
17	28	(Hungary) Gábor Talmácsi	Honda	23	+33.905	13	
18	10	(Germany) Jarno Müller	Honda	23	+38.247	22	
19	12	(Spain) Raúl Jara	Aprilia	23	+58.393	27	
20	34	(Andorra) Eric Bataille	Honda	23	+1:13.859	30	
Ret	54	(San Marino) Manuel Poggiali	Gilera	22	Accident	2	
Ret	43	(Spain) Daniel Piñera	Honda	21	Retirement	31	
Ret	41	(Japan) Youichi Ui	Derbi	19	Accident	1	
Ret	22	(Spain) Pablo Nieto	Derbi	18	Retirement	17	
Ret	14	(Germany) Philipp Hafeneger	Honda	18	Retirement	32	
Ret	20	(Italy) Gaspare Caffiero	Aprilia	10	Retirement	10	
Ret	8	(Italy) Gianluigi Scalvini	Italjet	9	Retirement	21	
Ret	19	(Italy) Alessandro Brannetti	Aprilia	7	Retirement	28	
Ret	27	(Italy) Marco Petrini	Honda	7	Retirement	29	
Ret	6	(Italy) Mirko Giansanti	Honda	6	Accident	19	
Ret	17	(Germany) Steve Jenkner	Aprilia	6	Retirement	11	
Ret	16	(Italy) Simone Sanna	Aprilia	4	Retirement	5	

== Championship standings after the race (500cc) ==
Below are the standings for the top five riders and constructors after round three has concluded.

Riders' Championship standings

Pos.	Rider	Points
1	(Italy) Valentino Rossi	75
2	(Japan) Norifumi Abe	44
3	(Japan) Shinya Nakano	37
4	(Italy) Loris Capirossi	36
5	(Spain) Àlex Crivillé	33

Constructors' Championship standings

Pos.	Constructor	Points
1	(Japan) Honda	75
2	(Japan) Yamaha	53
3	(Japan) Suzuki	27
4	(Malaysia) Proton KR	13
5	(United Kingdom) Sabre V4	0

- Note: Only the top five positions are included for both sets of standings.

Previous race: 2001 South African Grand Prix	FIM Grand Prix World Championship; 2001 season	Next race: 2001 French Grand Prix
Previous race: 2000 Spanish Grand Prix	Spanish Grand Prix	Next race: 2002 Spanish Grand Prix
