= Honda NSR500V =

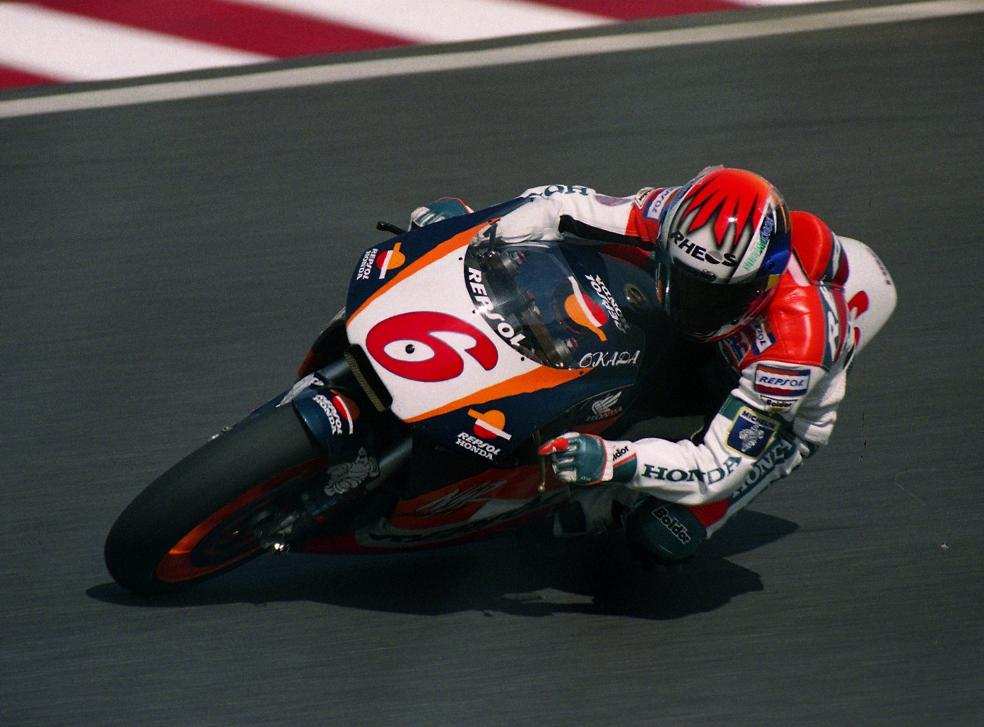
- Manufacturer: Honda Racing Corporation
- Production: 1996-2001
- Class: 500 cc
- Engine: 499 cc (30.5 cu in) two-stroke 100° V2
- Bore / stroke: 68 mm × 68.8 mm (2.68 in × 2.71 in)
- Compression ratio: 14:1
- Power: 135 hp (101 kW) @ 10,250 rpm
- Torque: 94.1 N⋅m (69.4 lbf⋅ft) @ 10,000 rpm
- Wheelbase: 1,380 mm (54 in)
- Dimensions: L: 1,995 mm (78.5 in); W: 600 mm (24 in)
- Weight: over 100 kg (220 lb) (dry)
- Fuel capacity: 26 L (5.7 imp gal; 6.9 US gal)
- Related: Honda NSR500

The Honda NSR500V is a race motorcycle from the Honda NSR series. It was designed and manufactured by HRC and debuted in 1996 for the Grand Prix motorcycle racing's 500 cc class. The bike was conceived by Honda to be a viable machine for privateer teams to enter the class.

== Characteristics ==
The V-twin water-cooled two-stroke used the same crankcase reed-valve induction as the Honda NSR500 V4. The 100-degree V2 also used a single crankshaft, a feature common to all of Honda's GP race bikes of the time. Weighing in at 103 kg, it produced a claimed 135 bhp (101 kW) when running on hi-octane avgas. Although it made less power than its V4 counterpart (some 40-50 hp less), it was lighter, easier to ride and better handling. At many circuits it was capable of lapping just as fast as a V4, given a clear track. Its main strength was being able to carry a higher corner speed than the V4. However its weakness became apparent in traffic. If the V2 lost its momentum through the corner, a V4 was able to use its better acceleration and power to pull away. It was nevertheless to fulfil its purpose of being a competitive and realistic machine for private teams.

== Racing history ==
Initially Honda ran two fully works-supported bikes in 1996 as part of the established Repsol squad, the bikes being ridden by Tadayuki Okada and Shinichi Itoh. The machine made an immediate impact with Okada securing pole position for its maiden race in 1996, in Malaysia. Okada was to bring the new bike home in the Top 5 on six occasions, its best finish being a 2nd at the final race in Australia. When the Grand Prix season had finished, Honda also entered the V2 in the MFJ Grand Prix Superbike Race which pitted most of the top Grand Prix teams against each other in a one-off race at Sportsland SUGO. Okada won the event on the V2, ahead of the established V4s from Honda, Suzuki and Yamaha.

Honda continued to develop the V2 over the winter of 1996 and again entered the V2 as a works machine in 1997, this time piloted by Takuma Aoki. The bike proved competitive scoring seven Top 5 placings, its best being 2nd in Australia. The V2 was also sold to private teams, among them the newly formed Gresini Racing with rider Alex Barros who got onto the podium at Donington and finished the season 9th (ahead of six factory V4 bikes).

Over the course of 1998 and 1999, Sete Gibernau, who replaced the injured Takuma Aoki rode the official V2 and reached the podium on two more occasions. More private teams had also purchased V2 machines and by 2000, the machine had become a realistic option for privateers to compete in the category, with the bikes being consistently able to finish in the points. In 2000 Jurgen van den Goorbergh won Best Privateer, with Haruchika Aoki winning the same award the following year – both on board NSR500Vs. In its final evolution, the 2001-spec NSR500V featured an updated crankcase set as well as more robust transmission.

The introduction of rules allowing four-stroke machines to enter the class in 2002 effectively put an end to the competitiveness of the two-stroke V2 as even the two-stroke V4 machines quickly became obsolete.

Twenty-two NSR500V motorcycles were produced by Honda Racing Corporation in total. Unlike the V4 NSR500s which were merely leased out to teams, the V2s were sold to teams, many of whom later sold them outside the Grand Prix arena. Some were campaigned in national-level races while many ended up in private motorcycle collections.

Honda NSR500V Specifications
Engine Type:	2-stroke water-cooled V2 single crankshaft reed valve
Displacement:	499.7 cc
Max Power:	135 bhp (101 kW) @ 10250 rpm
Carburation Type:	40 mm Keihin PJ short type
Ignition:	CDI digital
Clutch:	Dry multiple discs
Transmission:	6-speed cassette type
Final Drive:	Chain
Frame Type:	Twin spar aluminum
Suspension:	Front: Showa Inverted telescopic forks Rear: Showa mono shock
Tires:	Michelin
Wheel:	Front: 3.625 x 17 inches (430 mm); Rear: 5.875 x 17 inches (430 mm)
Brake System:	Front: Carbon composite disc (290 mm), Brembo 4 pot calipers Rear: cast iron disc (196 mm), 2 pot calipers
Overall Length:	1975 mm
Overall Width:	595 mm
Wheelbase:	1360 mm
Weight:	103 kg
Fuel Tank:	26L

== See also ==
- Honda NSR500
- Aprilia RSW-2 500
- Cagiva C593
- Suzuki RGV500
- Yamaha YZR500
- ELF 500 ROC
- Sabre V4
