= Paton PG500RC =

Racing motorcycle

- Manufacturer: Paton
- Production: 2000-2001
- Predecessor: Paton V70 500
- Successor: None
- Engine: 499.3 cc (30.47 cu in) two-stroke 70° V4
- Bore / stroke: 54 mm × 54.5 mm (2.13 in × 2.15 in)
- Power: 190 hp (140 kW) @ 12,800 rpm
- Transmission: Chain
- Wheelbase: 1400 mm
- Weight: 135 kg (298 lb) (dry)

The Paton PG500R and Paton PG500RC are racing bikes of the Italian motorcycle manufacturer Paton, which debuted in the 500cc class of grand Prix motorcycle racing from 2000 until 2001, only participating in a few races, due to a lack of funds from the company and the difficulty of finding a sponsor.

== Description ==
With the introduction of the PG500R in 2000, this bike used the new 54x54.4. engine measure for the first time, instead of the 56x50,6 ( bore x stroke ) configuration used in previous Paton bikes.

In 2000, the PG500R used a double beam aluminum frame and a swingarm from "Paton LM Gianetti" whilst in 2001, the PG500RC switched to a "Paton Cagiva V 594 in Anticorodal material" and also changing the livery slightly. The tank and the tail inspired by the Paton C10/5 were no longer used, but a more rounded tank and a higher tail were used instead.

The bikes also differ from the previous model, mainly due to the absence of the radiator slits and the use of a lower fairing, which is wider and laps both wheels, while the fairing is higher and more protective.

== 2000 ==
Despite the death of Roberto Pattoni's father Giuseppe Pattoni 1999, Roberto continued to develop the teams racing motorbikes, but the team would score only one point in the 2000 Grand Prix motorcycle racing season as a wildcard entry, when Paolo Tessari finished fifteenth at the Sachsenring on the teams PG500R machine.

== 2001 ==
With the arrival of the 4 stroke and highly expensive MotoGP, which allowed for a double capacity (1000cc) and with the clear intent to push for the 2 stroke retirement by the FIM, Roberto Pattoni and his team decided to pull out of grand prix motorcycle racing after the 2001 season, mainly due to the ever rising costs in the sport which were needed to create a new 1000cc 4-stroke MotoGP bike, that the Paton team did not have the budget for. During this season, Paton was sponsored by Slovnaft thanks to the wildcard rider Vladimír Častka, but failed to score any points due to the retirement of Shaun Geronimi at the 2001 Czech Republic motorcycle Grand Prix, the two DNQ's of Vladimír Častka at the 2001 Spanish motorcycle Grand Prix and 2001 Italian motorcycle Grand Prix and the withdrawal of Sébastien Gimbert from the 2001 British motorcycle Grand Prix after he crashed 20 minutes into the first practice session and broke his ankle.

== Specifications ==
Paton PG500RC (2001) Specifications
Engine
Engine type:	70 ° 2-stroke V- cylinder
Displacement:	498 cm^{3} (Bore 54 x Stroke 54.4 mm)
Ignition:	Digital CDI with "Walbro Bike 400" battery
Fuel System:	Fuel injection
Fuel:	ENEOS unleaded (Movistar Yamaha)/Motul (Yamaha Tech3)
Lubricants:	
Lubrication system:	
Data recording:	
Maximum power:	Over 190 hp at 12,800 rpm
Maximum speed:	In excess of 340 km/h (211 mph)
Exhaust:	
Transmission
Type:	Extractable sequential 6-speed (always in grip)
Primary drive:	Gear
Clutch:	Dry multi-plate
Final drive:	Chain
Chassis and running gear
Frame type:	Paton Cagiva V594 in Anticorodal material (inclined double beam, in aluminum)
Front suspension:	Fully adjustable Öhlins upside-down 42mm fork
Rear suspension:	Fully adjustable Öhlins shock absorber
Front/rear wheels:	Front: 3.5 x 17" alloy rim / Rear: 6.0 x 17" alloy rim
Front/rear tyres:	Michelin, front on a circle of 3.50 17; rear on rim from 6.00 17
Front brake:	Double 320 mm carbon disc with Brembo 4 piston monobloc caliper
Rear brake:	Single disc 220 steel with Brembo caliper 2 pistons
Weight:	135 kg / 298 lbs
Fuel capacity:	

== See also ==
- Honda NSR500
- Aprilia RSW-2 500
- Cagiva C593
- Suzuki RGV500
- Yamaha YZR500
- Sabre V4
