= José David de Gea =

Spanish motorcycle racer

- Nationality: Spanish
- Born: 9 December 1977 (age 48); Cehegín, Spain
Motorcycle racing career statistics
MotoGP World Championship
Active years	2003–2004
Manufacturers	Sabre V4, Harris WCM
Championships	0
2004 championship position	NC (0 pts)
Starts / Wins / Podiums / Poles / F. laps / Points; 9 / 0 / 0 / 0 / 0 / 0
500cc World Championship
Active years	1999–2000
Manufacturers	TSR-Honda, Honda, Modenas KR3
2000 championship position	31st (3 pts)
Starts / Wins / Podiums / Poles / F. laps / Points; 17 / 0 / 0 / 0 / 0 / 31
250cc World Championship
Active years	1997–1998, 2001, 2004, 2006
Manufacturers	Aprilia, TSR-Honda, Honda
Championships	0
2006 championship position	24th (9 pts)
Starts / Wins / Podiums / Poles / F. laps / Points; 25 / 0 / 1 / 0 / 0 / 41
125cc World Championship
Active years	1995–1996
Manufacturers	Honda
1996 championship position	NC (0 pts)
Starts / Wins / Podiums / Poles / F. laps / Points; 3 / 0 / 0 / 0 / 0 / 0
Superbike World Championship
Active years	2006
Manufacturers	Honda
Championships	0
2006 championship position	31st (2 pts)
Starts / Wins / Podiums / Poles / F. laps / Points; 2 / 0 / 0 / 0 / 0 / 2
Supersport World Championship
Active years	1999, 2002, 2008
Manufacturers	Honda, Yamaha
2008 championship position	NC (0 pts)
Starts / Wins / Podiums / Poles / F. laps / Points; 11 / 0 / 0 / 0 / 0 / 15

José David de Gea Tudela (born 9 December 1977) is a Spanish motorcycle racer. He has competed at international level in the 125cc, 250cc, 500cc and MotoGP classes of Grand Prix motorcycle racing, the Supersport World Championship and the Superbike World Championship.

At the national level, de Gea won the CEV Fórmula Extreme title four times: in 2003, 2005, 2006 and 2007.

== Career statistics ==
=== Grand Prix motorcycle racing ===
==== By season ====
Season	Class	Motorcycle	Team	Race	Win	Podium	Pole	FLap	Pts	Plcd
1995	125cc	Honda		1	0	0	0	0	0	NC
1996	125cc	Honda		2	0	0	0	0	0	NC
1997	250cc	Yamaha		1	0	0	0	0	0	NC
1999	500cc	TSR-Honda	Team Maxon TSR	1	0	0	0	0	8	23rd
1999	500cc	Honda	Dee Cee Jeans Racing Team	2	0	0	0	0	8	23rd
1999	500cc	Modenas KR3	Proton KR Modenas	5	0	0	0	0	8	23rd
2000	500cc	Modenas KR3	Proton TEAM KR	9	0	0	0	0	23	17th
2001	250cc	Yamaha	Antena 3 Yamaha-d'Antin	16	0	1	0	0	24	19th
2003	MotoGP	Sabre V4	WCM	2	0	0	0	0	0	NC
2003	MotoGP	Harris WCM	WCM	6	0	0	0	0	0	NC
2004	MotoGP	Harris WCM	WCM	1	0	0	0	0	0	NC
2004	250cc	Honda	Wurth Honda BQR	5	0	0	0	0	8	27th
2006	250cc	Honda	Repsol Honda	3	0	0	0	0	9	24th
Total				**54**	**0**	**1**	**0**	**0**	**72**	

==== Races by year ====
(key) (Races in bold indicate pole position, races in italics indicate fastest lap)

Year	Class	Bike	1	2	3	4	5	6	7	8	9	10	11	12	13	14	15	16	Pos.	Pts
1995	125cc	Honda	AUS	MAL	JPN	SPA	GER	ITA	NED	FRA	GBR	CZE	BRA	ARG	EUR; 16				NC	0
1996	125cc	Honda	MAL; Ret	INA; Ret	JPN	SPA	ITA	FRA	NED	GER	GBR	AUT	CZE	IMO	CAT	BRA	AUS		NC	0
1997	250cc	Yamaha	MAL	JPN	SPA	ITA	AUT	FRA	NED	IMO	GER	BRA	GBR	CZE	CAT; Ret	INA	AUS		NC	0
1998	250cc	Yamaha	JPN	MAL	SPA	ITA	FRA	MAD; DNQ	NED	GBR	GER	CZE	IMO	CAT	AUS	ARG			NC	0
1999	500cc	TSR-Honda	MAL	JPN	SPA	FRA	ITA	CAT	NED	GBR	GER; 15								23rd	8
1999	500cc	Honda										CZE; Ret	IMO; Ret						23rd	8
1999	500cc	Modenas KR3												VAL; 14	AUS; 13	RSA; 20	BRA; 14	ARG; Ret	23rd	8
2000	500cc	Modenas KR3	RSA; 15	MAL; 14	JPN; 15	SPA; 12	FRA; 16	ITA; Ret	CAT; 8	NED; 14	GBR	GER	CZE	POR	VAL; 11	BRA	PAC	AUS	17th	23
2001	250cc	Yamaha	JPN; Ret	RSA; Ret	SPA; Ret	FRA; 18	ITA; 13	CAT; 21	NED; 3	GBR; 17	GER; Ret	CZE; 19	POR; 13	VAL; 15	PAC; Ret	AUS; Ret	MAL; 20	BRA; 15	19th	24
2003	MotoGP	Sabre V4	JPN	RSA	SPA	FRA	ITA	CAT	NED	GBR; Ret	GER; 20	CZE; DNS							NC	0
2003	MotoGP	Harris WCM											POR; 22	BRA; 19	PAC; 19	MAL; Ret	AUS; Ret	VAL; 20	NC	0
2004	MotoGP	Harris WCM	RSA	SPA	FRA	ITA	CAT	NED	BRA; Ret	GER									NC	0
2004	250cc	Honda									GBR; 16	CZE	POR	JPN	QAT; 15	MAL; 17	AUS; 14	VAL; 11	27th	8
2006	250cc	Honda	SPA	QAT	TUR	CHN	FRA	ITA	CAT	NED	GBR	GER	CZE	MAL	AUS	JPN; Ret	POR; 14	VAL; 9	24th	9

=== Supersport World Championship ===
==== Races by year ====
(key) (Races in bold indicate pole position) (Races in italics indicate fastest lap)

Year	Team	1	2	3	4	5	6	7	8	9	10	11	12	13	Pos.	Pts
1999	Honda	RSA; 9	GBR; Ret	SPA; Ret	ITA; 15	GER; 20	SMR; 17	USA	EUR; 14	AUT	NED	GER			26th	10
2002	Honda	SPA	AUS	RSA	JPN; 12	ITA; 18	GBR; 23	GER; 15	SMR	GBR	GER	NED	ITA		30th	5
2008	Yamaha	QAT	AUS	SPA	NED	ITA	GER; DNS	SMR	CZE	GBR	EUR	ITA	FRA	POR	NC	0

=== Superbike World Championship ===
==== Races by year ====
(key) (Races in bold indicate pole position) (Races in italics indicate fastest lap)

Year	Make	1		2		3		4		5		6		7		8		9		10		11		12		Pos.	Pts
Year	Make	R1	R2	R1	R2	R1	R2	R1	R2	R1	R2	R1	R2	R1	R2	R1	R2	R1	R2	R1	R2	R1	R2	R1	R2	Pos.	Pts
2006	Honda	QAT	QAT	AUS	AUS	SPA; 14	SPA; 19	ITA	ITA	EUR	EUR	SMR	SMR	CZE	CZE	GBR	GBR	NED	NED	GER	GER	ITA	ITA	FRA	FRA	31st	2
