= 2003 Czech Republic motorcycle Grand Prix =

2003 Czech Republic Grand Prix
Race details
- Race 10 of 16 races in the 2003 Grand Prix motorcycle racing season
- Date: 17 August 2003
- Official name: Gauloises Grand Prix České republiky
- Location: Brno Circuit
- Course: Permanent racing facility; 5.403 km (3.357 mi)

MotoGP
Pole position
Rider	(Italy) Valentino Rossi	Honda
Time	1:58.769	
Fastest lap
Rider	(Italy) Valentino Rossi	Honda
Time	1:59.966 on lap 22	
Podium
First	(Italy) Valentino Rossi	Honda
Second	(Spain) Sete Gibernau	Honda
Third	(Australia) Troy Bayliss	Ducati

250cc
Pole position
Rider	(San Marino) Manuel Poggiali	Aprilia
Time	2:03.872	
Fastest lap
Rider	(Spain) Toni Elías	Aprilia
Time	2:03.969 on lap 11	
Podium
First	(France) Randy de Puniet	Aprilia
Second	(Spain) Toni Elías	Aprilia
Third	(San Marino) Manuel Poggiali	Aprilia

125cc
Pole position
Rider	(San Marino) Alex de Angelis	Aprilia
Time	2:08.100	
Fastest lap
Rider	(Italy) Lucio Cecchinello	Aprilia
Time	2:07.836 on lap 4	
Podium
First	(Spain) Daniel Pedrosa	Honda
Second	(Italy) Stefano Perugini	Aprilia
Third	(San Marino) Alex de Angelis	Aprilia

The 2003 Czech Republic motorcycle Grand Prix was the tenth round of the 2003 MotoGP Championship. It took place on the weekend of 15–17 August 2003 at the Brno Circuit located in Brno, Czech Republic.

Chris Burns, riding a ROC Yamaha, would become the last rider to start a race in Grand Prix motorcycle racing's premier class with a 2-stroke 500cc bike. His teammate, José David de Gea, also entered the race riding the Sabre V4 500cc bike, but he did not take the start.

== MotoGP classification ==
Pos.	No.	Rider	Team	Manufacturer	Laps	Time/Retired	Grid	Points
1	46	(Italy) Valentino Rossi	Repsol Honda	Honda	22	44:18.907	1	25
2	15	(Spain) Sete Gibernau	Telefónica Movistar Honda	Honda	22	+0.042	2	20
3	12	(Australia) Troy Bayliss	Ducati Marlboro Team	Ducati	22	+0.668	6	16
4	7	(Spain) Carlos Checa	Fortuna Yamaha Team	Yamaha	22	+5.390	5	13
5	3	(Italy) Max Biaggi	Camel Pramac Pons	Honda	22	+8.729	3	11
6	69	(United States) Nicky Hayden	Repsol Honda	Honda	22	+11.043	7	10
7	4	(Brazil) Alex Barros	Gauloises Yamaha Team	Yamaha	22	+11.439	9	9
8	11	(Japan) Tohru Ukawa	Camel Pramac Pons	Honda	22	+13.574	8	8
9	6	(Japan) Makoto Tamada	Pramac Honda	Honda	22	+23.273	10	7
10	33	(Italy) Marco Melandri	Fortuna Yamaha Team	Yamaha	22	+26.404	17	6
11	19	(France) Olivier Jacque	Gauloises Yamaha Team	Yamaha	22	+26.685	11	5
12	45	(United States) Colin Edwards	Alice Aprilia Racing	Aprilia	22	+30.728	12	4
13	41	(Japan) Noriyuki Haga	Alice Aprilia Racing	Aprilia	22	+39.531	18	3
14	56	(Japan) Shinya Nakano	d'Antín Yamaha Team	Yamaha	22	+41.240	14	2
15	23	(Japan) Ryuichi Kiyonari	Telefónica Movistar Honda	Honda	22	+44.623	15	1
16	88	(Australia) Andrew Pitt	Kawasaki Racing Team	Kawasaki	22	+55.499	22	
17	21	(United States) John Hopkins	Suzuki Grand Prix Team	Suzuki	22	+55.677	13	
18	8	(Australia) Garry McCoy	Kawasaki Racing Team	Kawasaki	22	+1:00.700	19	
19	66	(Germany) Alex Hofmann	Kawasaki Racing Team	Kawasaki	22	+1:08.130	20	
20	10	(United States) Kenny Roberts Jr.	Suzuki Grand Prix Team	Suzuki	22	+1:14.524	16	
Ret	65	(Italy) Loris Capirossi	Ducati Marlboro Team	Ducati	19	Retirement	4	
Ret	99	(United Kingdom) Jeremy McWilliams	Proton Team KR	Proton KR	12	Retirement	21	
Ret	9	(Japan) Nobuatsu Aoki	Proton Team KR	Proton KR	11	Retirement	23	
Ret	35	(United Kingdom) Chris Burns	WCM	ROC Yamaha	9	Retirement	25	
DNS	52	(Spain) David de Gea	WCM	Sabre V4	0	Did not start	24	

== 250 cc classification ==
Pos.	No.	Rider	Manufacturer	Laps	Time/Retired	Grid	Points
1	7	(France) Randy de Puniet	Aprilia	20	41:45.354	2	25
2	24	(Spain) Toni Elías	Aprilia	20	+0.527	4	20
3	54	(San Marino) Manuel Poggiali	Aprilia	20	+0.951	1	16
4	3	(Italy) Roberto Rolfo	Honda	20	+5.492	6	13
5	5	(Argentina) Sebastián Porto	Honda	20	+10.407	10	11
6	10	(Spain) Fonsi Nieto	Aprilia	20	+10.875	3	10
7	21	(Italy) Franco Battaini	Aprilia	20	+15.278	5	9
8	50	(France) Sylvain Guintoli	Aprilia	20	+15.565	7	8
9	8	(Japan) Naoki Matsudo	Yamaha	20	+32.752	9	7
10	33	(Spain) Héctor Faubel	Aprilia	20	+36.167	14	6
11	9	(France) Hugo Marchand	Aprilia	20	+36.608	12	5
12	34	(France) Eric Bataille	Honda	20	+50.700	15	4
13	28	(Germany) Dirk Heidolf	Aprilia	20	+52.299	17	3
14	57	(United Kingdom) Chaz Davies	Aprilia	20	+52.870	20	2
15	15	(Germany) Christian Gemmel	Honda	20	+53.063	16	1
16	11	(Spain) Joan Olivé	Aprilia	20	+58.903	22	
17	52	(Czech Republic) Lukáš Pešek	Yamaha	20	+1:08.193	24	
18	66	(Finland) Vesa Kallio	Yamaha	20	+1:35.989	25	
19	74	(Czech Republic) Michal Filla	Yamaha	20	+1:44.230	26	
20	98	(Germany) Katja Poensgen	Honda	20	+1:59.070	28	
21	47	(Netherlands) Arie Vos	Yamaha	20	+2:01.799	27	
22	75	(Hungary) Gábor Rizmayer	Honda	19	+1 lap	29	
Ret	96	(Czech Republic) Jakub Smrž	Honda	19	Accident	21	
Ret	16	(Sweden) Johan Stigefelt	Aprilia	13	Retirement	18	
Ret	18	(Netherlands) Henk vd Lagemaat	Honda	12	Retirement	30	
Ret	26	(Italy) Alex Baldolini	Aprilia	6	Retirement	23	
Ret	14	(Australia) Anthony West	Aprilia	3	Retirement	8	
Ret	36	(France) Erwan Nigon	Aprilia	0	Accident	19	
Ret	73	(Czech Republic) Radomil Rous	Aprilia	0	Accident	11	
DNS	6	(Spain) Alex Debón	Honda	0	Did not start	13	

== 125 cc classification ==
Pos.	No.	Rider	Manufacturer	Laps	Time/Retired	Grid	Points
1	3	(Spain) Daniel Pedrosa	Honda	19	40:59.354	4	25
2	7	(Italy) Stefano Perugini	Aprilia	19	+3.981	5	20
3	15	(San Marino) Alex de Angelis	Aprilia	19	+10.454	1	16
4	36	(Finland) Mika Kallio	KTM	19	+11.052	17	13
5	80	(Spain) Héctor Barberá	Aprilia	19	+12.351	9	11
6	34	(Italy) Andrea Dovizioso	Honda	19	+12.968	10	10
7	6	(Italy) Mirko Giansanti	Aprilia	19	+21.109	11	9
8	23	(Italy) Gino Borsoi	Aprilia	19	+21.513	12	8
9	41	(Japan) Youichi Ui	Aprilia	19	+24.841	14	7
10	42	(Italy) Gioele Pellino	Aprilia	19	+34.942	15	6
11	79	(Hungary) Gábor Talmácsi	Aprilia	19	+35.213	8	5
12	48	(Spain) Jorge Lorenzo	Derbi	19	+41.042	13	4
13	8	(Japan) Masao Azuma	Honda	19	+41.362	19	3
14	58	(Italy) Marco Simoncelli	Aprilia	19	+41.540	23	2
15	63	(France) Mike Di Meglio	Aprilia	19	+41.662	22	1
16	19	(Spain) Álvaro Bautista	Aprilia	19	+42.513	30	
17	10	(Italy) Roberto Locatelli	KTM	19	+43.010	26	
18	32	(Italy) Fabrizio Lai	Malaguti	19	+43.068	16	
19	88	(Denmark) Robbin Harms	Aprilia	19	+1:02.481	25	
20	33	(Italy) Stefano Bianco	Gilera	19	+1:02.611	21	
21	26	(Spain) Emilio Alzamora	Derbi	19	+1:02.747	27	
22	31	(Spain) Julián Simón	Malaguti	19	+1:10.272	24	
23	25	(Hungary) Imre Tóth	Honda	19	+1:10.398	29	
24	55	(Czech Republic) Igor Kaláb	Honda	19	+1:20.158	32	
25	56	(Czech Republic) Markéta Janáková	Honda	19	+1:31.093	33	
26	57	(Slovenia) Luka Nedog	Honda	18	+1 lap	36	
Ret	92	(Czech Republic) Václav Bittman	Honda	18	Accident	34	
Ret	50	(Italy) Andrea Ballerini	Honda	16	Retirement	31	
Ret	22	(Spain) Pablo Nieto	Aprilia	11	Accident	6	
Ret	12	(Switzerland) Thomas Lüthi	Honda	11	Accident	7	
Ret	11	(Italy) Max Sabbatani	Aprilia	10	Retirement	28	
Ret	4	(Italy) Lucio Cecchinello	Aprilia	9	Accident	3	
Ret	17	(Germany) Steve Jenkner	Aprilia	9	Accident	2	
Ret	24	(Italy) Simone Corsi	Honda	8	Accident	18	
Ret	78	(Hungary) Péter Lénárt	Honda	7	Retirement	35	
DNS	39	(Japan) Hiroyuki Kikuchi	Honda	0	Did not start	20	
DNS	27	(Australia) Casey Stoner	Aprilia		Did not start		

== Championship standings after the race (MotoGP) ==
Below are the standings for the top five riders and constructors after round ten has concluded.

Riders' Championship standings

Pos.	Rider	Points
1	(Italy) Valentino Rossi	212
2	(Spain) Sete Gibernau	178
3	(Italy) Max Biaggi	141
4	(Italy) Loris Capirossi	97
5	(Australia) Troy Bayliss	96

Constructors' Championship standings

Pos.	Constructor	Points
1	(Japan) Honda	245
2	(Italy) Ducati	145
3	(Japan) Yamaha	115
4	(Italy) Aprilia	58
5	(Malaysia) / (United States) Proton KR	27

- Note: Only the top five positions are included for both sets of standings.

Previous race: 2003 German Grand Prix	FIM Grand Prix World Championship; 2003 season	Next race: 2003 Portuguese Grand Prix
Previous race: 2002 Czech Republic Grand Prix	Czech Republic motorcycle Grand Prix	Next race: 2004 Czech Republic Grand Prix
