= Franco Battaini =

Italian motorcycle racer

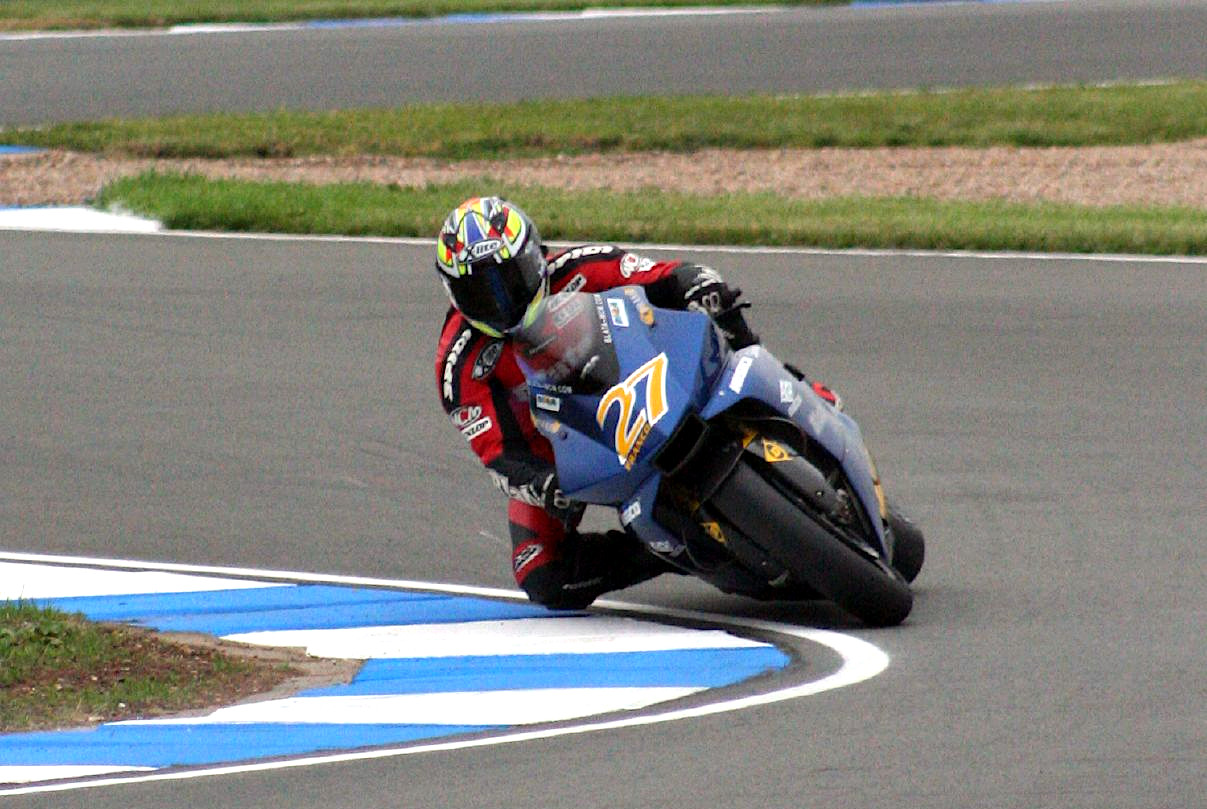
- Battaini at the 2005 British Grand Prix
- Nationality: Italian
- Born: 22 July 1972 (age 54); Brescia, Italy
Motorcycle racing career statistics
MotoGP World Championship
Active years	2005, 2012
Manufacturers	Blata, Ducati
Championships	0
2012 championship position	NC (0 pts)
Starts / Wins / Podiums / Poles / F. laps / Points; 18 / 0 / 0 / 0 / 0 / 7
250cc World Championship
Active years	1996–2004, 2006
Manufacturers	Honda, Yamaha, Aprilia
Championships	0
2006 championship position	26th (7 pts)
Starts / Wins / Podiums / Poles / F. laps / Points; 127 / 0 / 7 / 4 / 3 / 760
Superbike World Championship
Active years	2006
Manufacturers	Kawasaki
Championships	0
2006 championship position	NC (0 pts)
Starts / Wins / Podiums / Poles / F. laps / Points; 8 / 0 / 0 / 0 / 0 / 0
Supersport World Championship
Active years	2009
Manufacturers	Yamaha
Championships	0
2009 championship position	28th (5 pts)
Starts / Wins / Podiums / Poles / F. laps / Points; 1 / 0 / 0 / 0 / 0 / 5

Franco Battaini (born 22 July 1972 in Brescia) is an Italian motorcycle road racer. His best years were in 2002 and 2003 when he finished sixth in the 250cc world championship. In 2005, Battaini competed in MotoGP aboard the Blata WCM. He had a very unsuccessful season taking a best finish of 11th in Japan – where many riders retired from the race. In 2006, Battaini competed in the Superbike World Championship.

== Career statistics ==
=== Grand Prix motorcycle racing ===
==== Races by year ====
(key) (Races in bold indicate pole position, races in italics indicate fastest lap)

Year	Class	Bike	1	2	3	4	5	6	7	8	9	10	11	12	13	14	15	16	17	18	Pos.	Pts
1996	250cc	Aprilia	MAL	INA	JPN	SPA	ITA; 23	FRA	NED	GER	GBR	AUT	CZE	IMO; 19							NC	0
1996	250cc	Honda													CAT; Ret	BRA	AUS				NC	0
1997	250cc	Yamaha	MAL; 13	JPN; 21	SPA; 14	ITA; 13	AUT; 14	FRA; 12	NED; 11	IMO; 11	GER; 11	BRA	GBR; 11	CZE; 15	CAT; 15	INA; 12	AUS; 12				14th	44
1998	250cc	Yamaha	JPN; Ret	MAL; Ret	SPA; 12	ITA; 11	FRA; 11	MAD; DNS	NED	GBR	GER	CZE; 13	IMO; 13	CAT; 9	AUS; Ret	ARG; 9					18th	34
1999	250cc	Aprilia	MAL; Ret	**JPN**; 4	SPA; 4	FRA; 6	ITA; 6	CAT; 3	NED; 7	GBR; Ret	GER; Ret	CZE; 10	IMO; 6	VAL; 2	AUS; 8	RSA; 10	BRA; Ret	ARG; Ret			8th	121
2000	250cc	Aprilia	RSA; 6	MAL; 13	JPN; 7	SPA; 10	FRA; 11	ITA; 5	CAT; 5	NED; 20	GBR; Ret	GER; 7	CZE; 7	POR; 12	VAL; 6	BRA; 7	PAC; Ret	AUS; Ret			8th	96
2001	250cc	Aprilia	JPN; 7	RSA; 20	SPA; 9	FRA; 13	ITA; Ret	CAT; 20	NED; 5	GBR; 13	GER; 9	CZE; 14	POR; 9	VAL; 14	PAC; 8	AUS; Ret	MAL; 6	BRA; 10			10th	75
2002	250cc	Aprilia	JPN; 10	**RSA**; 2	**SPA**; 4	FRA; Ret	**ITA**; 6	CAT; 5	NED; 9	GBR; 4	GER; 8	CZE; Ret	POR; Ret	BRA; 3	PAC; 7	MAL; 5	AUS; 7	VAL; 7			6th	142
2003	250cc	Aprilia	JPN; 5	RSA; 3	SPA; 11	FRA; 18	ITA; 3	CAT; 6	NED; 2	GBR; 7	GER; 5	CZE; 7	POR; 6	BRA; Ret	PAC; Ret	MAL; 6	AUS; 4	VAL; 8			6th	148
2004	250cc	Aprilia	RSA; 10	SPA; Ret	FRA; 8	ITA; 12	CAT; 10	NED; 16	BRA; 10	GER; 9	GBR; 7	CZE; Ret	POR; 12	JPN; 9	QAT; 4	MAL; 6	AUS; Ret	VAL; 4			10th	93
2005	MotoGP	Blata	SPA; 17	POR; Ret	CHN; Ret	FRA; 17	ITA; 18	CAT; 19	NED; 20	USA; 17	GBR; Ret	GER; 15	CZE; 20	JPN; 11	MAL; 16	QAT; 16	AUS; 15	TUR; 17	VAL; 16		22nd	7
2006	250cc	Aprilia	SPA	QAT	TUR	CHN	FRA	ITA; Ret	CAT; Ret	NED; 13	GBR; 18	GER; 12	CZE	MAL	AUS	JPN	POR	VAL			26th	7
2012	MotoGP	Ducati	QAT	SPA	POR	FRA	CAT	GBR	NED	GER; 16	ITA	USA	INP	CZE	RSM	ARA	JPN	MAL	AUS	VAL	NC	0

=== Superbike World Championship ===
==== Races by year ====
(key) (Races in bold indicate pole position, races in italics indicate fastest lap)

Year	Make	1		2		3		4		5		6		7		8		9		10		11		12		Pos.	Pts
Year	Make	R1	R2	R1	R2	R1	R2	R1	R2	R1	R2	R1	R2	R1	R2	R1	R2	R1	R2	R1	R2	R1	R2	R1	R2	Pos.	Pts
2006	Kawasaki	QAT; 19	QAT; 20	AUS; 20	AUS; 22	SPA; 19	SPA; 21	ITA; 18	ITA; 23	EUR	EUR	SMR	SMR	CZE	CZE	GBR	GBR	NED	NED	GER	GER	ITA	ITA	FRA	FRA	NC	0

=== Supersport World Championship ===
(key) (Races in bold indicate pole position, races in italics indicate fastest lap)

==== Races by year ====
Year	Make	1	2	3	4	5	6	7	8	9	10	11	12	13	14	Pos.	Pts
2009	Yamaha	AUS	QAT	SPA	NED	ITA; 11	RSA	USA	SMR	GBR	CZE	GER	ITA	FRA	POR	28th	5
