= Emilio Alzamora =

Spanish motorcycle racer

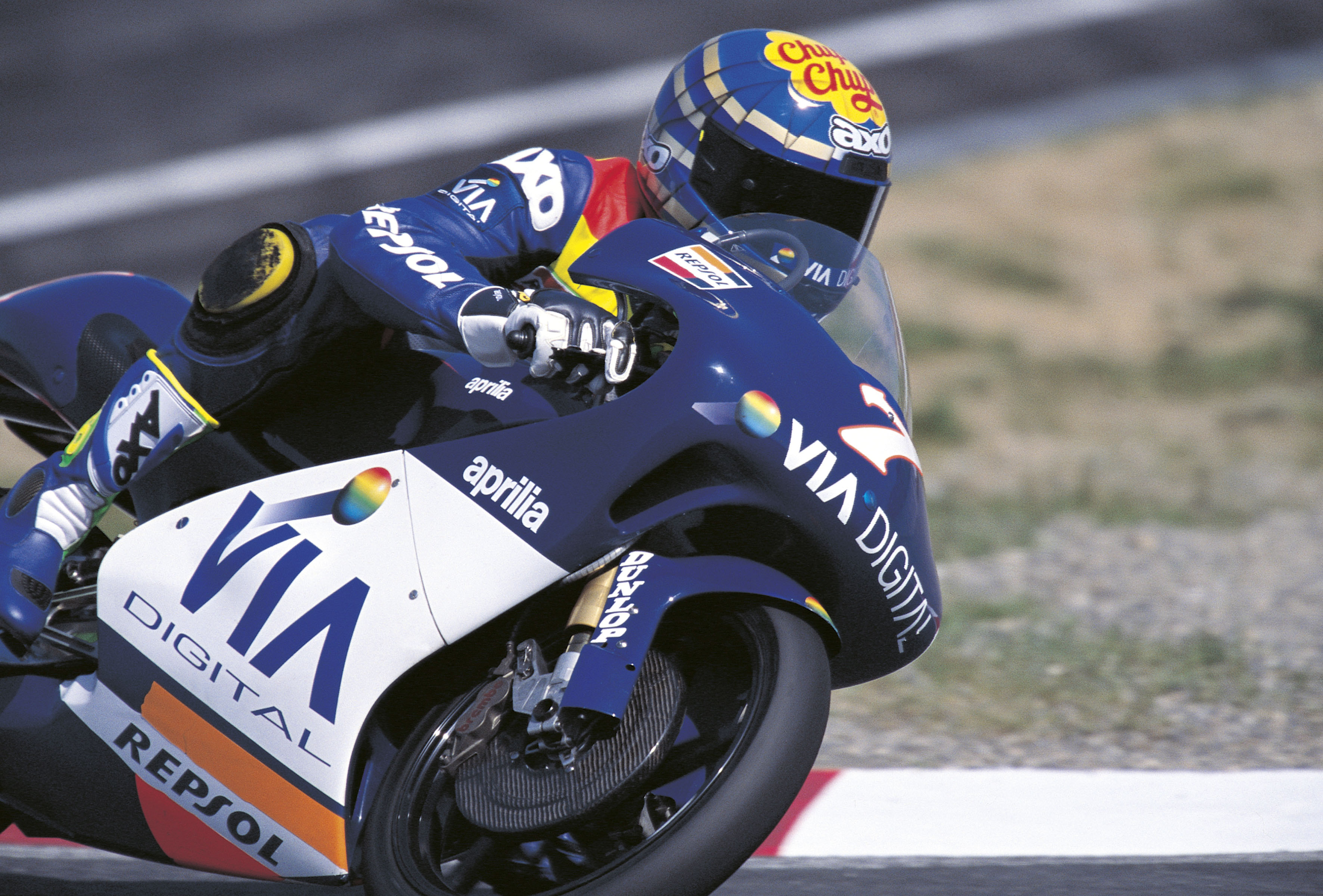
- Emilio Alzamora at the 1998 Japanese Grand Prix.
- Nationality: Spanish
Motorcycle racing career statistics
Grand Prix motorcycle racing
Active years	1994 - 2003
First race	1994 125cc Malaysian Grand Prix
Last race	2003 125cc Valencia Grand Prix
First win	1995 125cc Argentine Grand Prix
Last win	2000 125cc Portuguese Grand Prix
Team	Honda
Championships	125cc - 1999
Starts / Wins / Podiums / Poles / F. laps / Points; 144 / 4 / 30 / 1 / 5 / 1040

Emilio Alzamora Escardibul (born 22 May 1973 in Lleida, Spain) is a Spanish former Grand Prix motorcycle road racer. He was the 1999 F.I.M. 125cc world champion. He is the second rider to win a Grand Prix motorcycle world championship without having won a race after Manuel Herreros.

Alzamora got his start racing in the 80cc class, winning the 1989 80cc Championship of Catalunya at the age of 16. In 1994, he made his Grand Prix debut in the 125 class as a member of former world champion Paolo Pileri's team. He moved up to the 250 class in 1997, but after a season marred by injuries, he returned to the 125 class. Alzamora won the 1999 125cc world championship without winning a race by virtue of 10 podium positions, defeating Marco Melandri and Masao Azuma who each had five victories. He continued to compete until the 2003 season.

Since 2005, Alzamora is the director of the Monlau Competición technical school. He manages motorcycle racing projects from the base up to the Moto3 World Championship with the creation of the new Team Estrella Galicia 0,0.

== Career statistics ==
=== Grand Prix motorcycle racing ===
(key) (Races in bold indicate pole position, races in italics indicate fastest lap)

Year	Class	Bike	1	2	3	4	5	6	7	8	9	10	11	12	13	14	15	16	Pos.	Pts
1994	125cc	Honda	AUS	MAL; Ret	JPN; 16	SPA; Ret	AUT; 22	GER; 22	NED; 11	ITA; 18	FRA; Ret	GBR; 22	CZE; Ret	USA; 21	ARG; 5	EUR; Ret			22nd	16
1995	125cc	Honda	AUS; 4	MAL; 23	JPN; 7	SPA; 7	GER; 3	ITA; Ret	NED; Ret	FRA; 7	GBR; 3	CZE; 10	BRA; 10	**ARG**; 1	EUR; 2				**3rd**	**129**
1996	125cc	Honda	MAL; 5	INA; Ret	JPN; Ret	SPA; 2	ITA; 7	FRA; 3	NED; 1	GER; 4	GBR; Ret	AUT; Ret	CZE; 5	IMO; 2	CAT; 4	BRA; 2	AUS; Ret		4th	158
1997	250cc	Honda	MAL; 7	JPN; DNS	SPA	ITA; Ret	AUT; DNS	FRA	NED; Ret	IMO; 10	GER; 10	BRA; 14	GBR; Ret	CZE; 12	CAT; 12	INA; Ret	AUS; Ret		17th	31
1998	125cc	Aprilia	JPN; 21	MAL; 16	SPA; Ret	ITA; 17	FRA; Ret	MAD; Ret	NED; Ret	GBR; 14	GER; 5	CZE; Ret	IMO; 13	CAT; 14	AUS; 21	ARG; DNS			21st	18
1999	125cc	Honda	MAL; 2	JPN; 3	SPA; 3	FRA; 3	ITA; 6	CAT; 2	NED; 4	GBR; 3	GER; 2	CZE; 6	IMO; 4	VAL; 2	AUS; 15	RSA; Ret	BRA; 3	ARG; 2	**1st**	**227**
2000	125cc	Honda	RSA; 3	MAL; 4	JPN; 5	SPA; 1	FRA; 3	ITA; 7	CAT; Ret	NED; Ret	GBR; 2	GER; Ret	CZE; 3	POR; 1	VAL; 5	BRA; 8	PAC; 2	AUS; 4	**3rd**	**203**
2001	250cc	Honda	JPN; Ret	RSA; 19	SPA; 6	FRA; 4	ITA; 6	CAT; 7	NED; 2	GBR; 4	GER; Ret	CZE; 7	POR; Ret	VAL; 4	PAC; 2	AUS; 6	MAL; Ret	BRA; 7	7th	136
2002	250cc	Honda	JPN; 4	RSA; 7	SPA; 3	FRA; 7	ITA; 11	CAT; 9	NED; Ret	GBR; 12	GER; Ret	CZE	POR; 6	BRA; 7	PAC; 5	MAL; 8	AUS; 13	VAL; 3	7th	120
2003	125cc	Derbi	JPN; Ret	RSA; 23	SPA; 18	FRA; 19	ITA; Ret	CAT; Ret	NED; 21	GBR; Ret	GER; Ret	CZE; 21	POR; 19	BRA; Ret	PAC; Ret	MAL; 23	AUS; 14	VAL; 24	31st	2

Sporting positions
Preceded by Jorge Martínez	Spanish 125cc Champion; 1995	Succeeded by David Almansa
