= 1997 Australian motorcycle Grand Prix =

(Australia) 1997 Australian Grand Prix
Race details
- Race 15 of 15 races in the 1997 Grand Prix motorcycle racing season
- Date: 5 October 1997
- Official name: Australian Motorcycle Grand Prix
- Location: Phillip Island
- Course: Permanent racing facility; 4.448 km (2.764 mi)

500cc
Pole position
- Rider: (Australia) Mick Doohan
- Time: 1:33.135
Fastest lap
- Rider: (Australia) Mick Doohan
- Time: 1:34.113
Podium
- First: (Spain) Àlex Crivillé
- Second: (Japan) Takuma Aoki
- Third: (Japan) Norick Abe

250cc
Pole position
- Rider: (Italy) Max Biaggi
- Time: 1:34.789
Fastest lap
- Rider: (Germany) Ralf Waldmann
- Time: 1:35.409
Podium
- First: (Germany) Ralf Waldmann
- Second: (Italy) Max Biaggi
- Third: (France) Olivier Jacque

125cc
Pole position
- Rider: (Japan) Kazuto Sakata
- Time: 1:40.680
Fastest lap
- Rider: (Japan) Kazuto Sakata
- Time: 1:40.348
Podium
- First: (Japan) Noboru Ueda
- Second: (Japan) Kazuto Sakata
- Third: (Japan) Tomomi Manako

The 1997 Australian motorcycle Grand Prix was the last round of the 1997 Grand Prix motorcycle racing season. It took place on 5 October 1997 at the Phillip Island Grand Prix Circuit.

== 500 cc classification ==
| Pos. | Rider | Team | Manufacturer | Time/Retired | Points |
|---|---|---|---|---|---|
| 1 | (Spain) Àlex Crivillé | Repsol YPF Honda Team | Honda | 42:53.362 | 25 |
| 2 | (Japan) Takuma Aoki | Repsol Honda | Honda | +2.268 | 20 |
| 3 | (Japan) Norifumi Abe | Yamaha Team Rainey | Yamaha | +28.119 | 16 |
| 4 | (Japan) Tadayuki Okada | Repsol YPF Honda Team | Honda | +35.230 | 13 |
| 5 | (France) Regis Laconi | Team Tecmas | Honda | +35.540 | 11 |
| 6 | (Spain) Sete Gibernau | Yamaha Team Rainey | Yamaha | +35.678 | 10 |
| 7 | (Japan) Yukio Kagayama | Lucky Strike Suzuki | Suzuki | +35.770 | 9 |
| 8 | (Brazil) Alex Barros | Honda Gresini | Honda | +36.260 | 8 |
| 9 | (Australia) Peter Goddard | Lucky Strike Suzuki | Suzuki | +36.795 | 7 |
| 10 | (Spain) Carlos Checa | Movistar Honda Pons | Honda | +37.546 | 6 |
| 11 | (Italy) Doriano Romboni | IP Aprilia Racing Team | Aprilia | +37.761 | 5 |
| 12 | (Netherlands) Jurgen van den Goorbergh | Team Millar MQP | Honda | +56.989 | 4 |
| 13 | (Australia) Kirk McCarthy | World Championship Motorsports | Yamaha | +1:01.191 | 3 |
| 14 | (United States) Kenny Roberts Jr. | Marlboro Team Roberts | Modenas KR3 | +1:02.256 | 2 |
| 15 | (Spain) Alberto Puig | Movistar Honda Pons | Honda | +1:02.500 | 1 |
| 16 | (France) Jean-Michel Bayle | Marlboro Team Roberts | Modenas KR3 | +1:24.816 | |
| 17 | (Italy) Lucio Pedercini | Team Pedercini | ROC Yamaha | +1 Lap | |
| 18 | (France) Frederic Protat | Soverex FP Racing | Honda | +1 Lap | |
| 19 | (Belgium) Laurent Naveau | Millet Racing | ROC Yamaha | +1 Lap | |
| Ret | (Germany) Jürgen Fuchs | Elf 500 ROC | Elf 500 | Retirement | |
| Ret | (Japan) Nobuatsu Aoki | Rheos Elf FCC TS | Honda | Retirement | |
| Ret | (Italy) Luca Cadalora | Red Bull Yamaha WCM | Yamaha | Retirement | |
| Ret | (Australia) Mick Doohan | Repsol YPF Honda Team | Honda | Retirement | |
| Ret | (Spain) Juan Borja | Elf 500 ROC | Elf 500 | Retirement | |
| Ret | (Australia) Daryl Beattie | Lucky Strike Suzuki | Suzuki | Retirement | |

== 250 cc classification ==
| Pos | Rider | Manufacturer | Time/Retired | Points |
|---|---|---|---|---|
| 1 | (Germany) Ralf Waldmann | Honda | 40:09.735 | 25 |
| 2 | (Italy) Max Biaggi | Honda | +5.829 | 20 |
| 3 | (France) Olivier Jacque | Honda | +27.251 | 16 |
| 4 | (Japan) Takeshi Tsujimura | Honda | +27.639 | 13 |
| 5 | (Japan) Tetsuya Harada | Aprilia | +27.926 | 11 |
| 6 | (Australia) Troy Bayliss | Suzuki | +28.118 | 10 |
| 7 | (Italy) Stefano Perugini | Aprilia | +29.038 | 9 |
| 8 | (Japan) Tohru Ukawa | Honda | +43.594 | 8 |
| 9 | (Argentina) Sebastian Porto | Aprilia | +58.422 | 7 |
| 10 | (United Kingdom) Jeremy McWilliams | Honda | +1:05.476 | 6 |
| 11 | (Japan) Osamu Miyazaki | Yamaha | +1:05.563 | 5 |
| 12 | (Italy) Franco Battaini | Yamaha | +1:12.379 | 4 |
| 13 | (Italy) Cristiano Migliorati | Honda | +1:19.550 | 3 |
| 14 | (Japan) Haruchika Aoki | Honda | +1:19.683 | 2 |
| 15 | (Italy) Luca Boscoscuro | Honda | +1:19.740 | 1 |
| 16 | (Spain) Luis d'Antin | Yamaha | +1:21.981 | |
| 17 | (Switzerland) Oliver Petrucciani | Aprilia | +1:40.671 | |
| 18 | (Australia) William Strugnell | Honda | +1 Lap | |
| 19 | (Australia) Simon Weeks | Honda | +1 Lap | |
| 20 | (Australia) Ben Reid | Yamaha | +1 Lap | |
| 21 | (New Zealand) Michael Clunie | Yamaha | +1 Lap | |
| Ret | (Italy) Giuseppe Fiorillo | Aprilia | Retirement | |
| Ret | (United Kingdom) Jamie Robinson | Suzuki | Retirement | |
| Ret | (Spain) Eustaquio Gavira | Aprilia | Retirement | |
| Ret | (Spain) José Luis Cardoso | Yamaha | Retirement | |
| Ret | (France) William Costes | Honda | Retirement | |
| Ret | (Spain) Emilio Alzamora | Honda | Retirement | |

== 125 cc classification ==
| Pos | Rider | Manufacturer | Time/Retired | Points |
|---|---|---|---|---|
| 1 | (Japan) Noboru Ueda | Honda | 38:59.797 | 25 |
| 2 | (Japan) Kazuto Sakata | Aprilia | +1.366 | 20 |
| 3 | (Japan) Tomomi Manako | Honda | +1.866 | 16 |
| 4 | (Italy) Roberto Locatelli | Honda | +1.903 | 13 |
| 5 | (Italy) Gianluigi Scalvini | Honda | +5.587 | 11 |
| 6 | (Italy) Valentino Rossi | Aprilia | +18.953 | 10 |
| 7 | (Italy) Lucio Cecchinello | Honda | +27.244 | 9 |
| 8 | (Japan) Masaki Tokudome | Aprilia | +35.786 | 8 |
| 9 | (Australia) Garry McCoy | Aprilia | +35.897 | 7 |
| 10 | (Italy) Mirko Giansanti | Honda | +36.392 | 6 |
| 11 | (Spain) Enrique Maturana | Yamaha | +36.404 | 5 |
| 12 | (Japan) Masao Azuma | Honda | +36.466 | 4 |
| 13 | (Spain) Jorge Martinez | Aprilia | +44.911 | 3 |
| 14 | (Japan) Yoshiaki Katoh | Yamaha | +56.342 | 2 |
| 15 | (Germany) Manfred Geissler | Aprilia | +56.529 | 1 |
| 16 | (Germany) Steve Jenkner | Aprilia | +56.533 | |
| 17 | (Spain) Angel Nieto Jr | Aprilia | +1:00.032 | |
| 18 | (Spain) Josep Sarda | Honda | +1:00.176 | |
| 19 | (Malaysia) Shahrol Yuzy | Honda | +1:26.735 | |
| 20 | (Australia) Jay Taylor | Honda | +1:32.022 | |
| 21 | (New Zealand) Hayden Bool | Honda | +1 Lap | |
| 22 | (Australia) James Armstrong | Yamaha | +2 Laps | |
| Ret | (Japan) Youichi Ui | Yamaha | Retirement | |
| Ret | (Spain) Xavier Soler | Aprilia | Retirement | |
| Ret | (Australia) William Strugnell | Honda | Retirement | |
| Ret | (Australia) Andrew Willy | Yamaha | Retirement | |
| Ret | (Australia) Peter Galvin | Honda | Retirement | |
| Ret | (Germany) Dirk Raudies | Honda | Retirement | |
| Ret | (Czech Republic) Jaroslav Hules | Honda | Retirement | |
| Ret | (Italy) Gino Borsoi | Yamaha | Retirement | |
| Ret | (France) Frederic Petit | Honda | Retirement | |

| Previous race: 1997 Indonesian Grand Prix | FIM Grand Prix World Championship; 1997 season | Next race: 1998 Japanese Grand Prix |
| Previous race: 1996 Australian Grand Prix | Australian motorcycle Grand Prix | Next race: 1998 Australian Grand Prix |
