= Aprilia RS Cube =

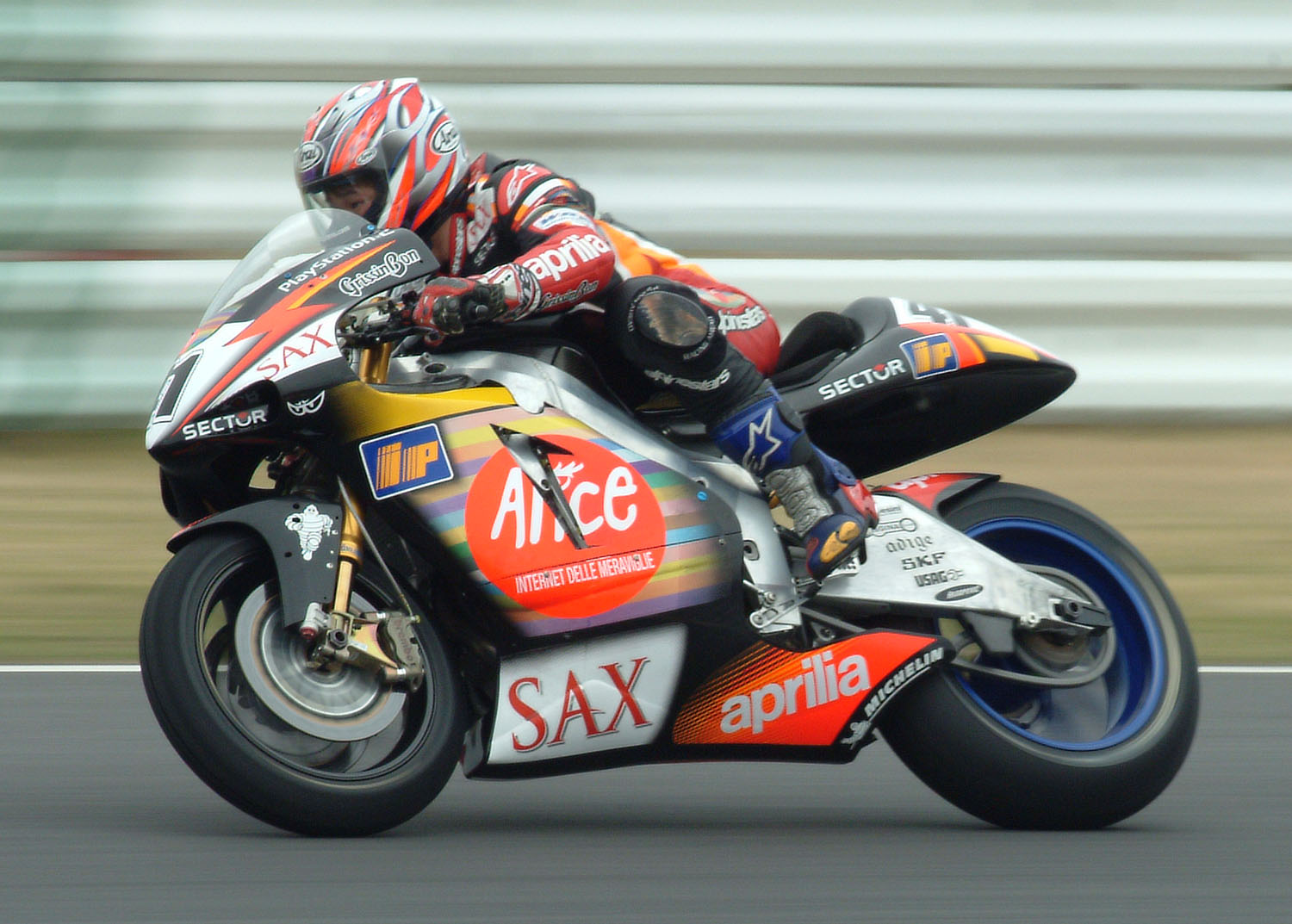
- Manufacturer: Aprilia
- Also called: Aprilia RS^{3}
- Production: 2002–2004
- Predecessor: Aprilia RSW-2 500
- Successor: Aprilia RS-GP
- Class: Race motorcycle (MotoGP)
- Engine: 988 cc (60.3 cu in) four-stroke inline-triple
- Bore / stroke: 93 mm × 48.49 mm (3.661 in × 1.909 in)
- Compression ratio: 14:1
- Power: > 220 hp (160 kW) @ 15,000 rpm
- Wheelbase: 1,410 mm (56 in)
- Weight: 135 kg (298 lb) (dry)
- Fuel capacity: 24 L (5.3 imp gal; 6.3 US gal)
- Related: Ducati Desmosedici; Honda RC211V; Kawasaki Ninja ZX-RR; Suzuki GSV-R; Yamaha YZR-M1

The RS Cube (often wrongly and redundantly referred as RS3 or RS3 Cube, due to the original lettering RS^{3}) is a prototype race motorcycle that was developed by Aprilia to compete in the 2002 until 2004 MotoGP seasons. It was unveiled at the Bologna Motor Show in December 2001 by Aprilia's president, Ivano Beggio, and their race boss, Jan Witteveen. The Cube is powered by a 990 cc inline-3 four-stroke engine (to conform to MotoGP rules of that time). The engine was developed with large F1-derived input from Cosworth, bringing many features not previously seen in motorcycle development - this includes pneumatic valves, traction control and ride-by-wire.

On the bike's first outing in 2002 it showed promise and claimed the top speed in the early races. The highly innovative engine and control system was poorly matched with the chassis which was too stiff and unforgiving. Through the 2002 season a handful of updates were made and in 2003 a 3-2-1 exhaust system was added to effectively de-tune the engine. This was coupled with a change to a 6 injector fuel system and a host of calibration changes which transformed the feel of the bike. At this point Aprilia took over the engine development programme themselves and did not take any further development updates from Cosworth.

Despite early promise the bike was not a success; the innovation shown in the 2002 season with traction control and drive by wire is only now being perfected. The engine design and development was carried out by a small team at Cosworth Racing in Northampton and went from CAD to track in 8 months.

The engine was considered the most powerful at that time, producing about 225 bhp (168 kW). A testbed that never was raced produced 235 bhp (175 kW) at one point, before Aprilia bowed out of MotoGP in 2004.

== See also ==
- Honda RC212V
- Suzuki GSV-R
- Yamaha YZR-M1
- Ducati Desmosedici
- Kawasaki Ninja ZX-RR
