= 1997 Indonesian motorcycle Grand Prix =

(Indonesia) 1997 Indonesian Grand Prix
Race details
- Race 14 of 15 races in the 1997 Grand Prix motorcycle racing season
- Date: 28 September 1997
- Official name: Marlboro Indonesian Grand Prix
- Location: Sentul International Circuit
- Course: Permanent racing facility; 3.965 km (2.464 mi)

500cc
Pole position
- Rider: (Australia) Mick Doohan
- Time: 1:25.474
Fastest lap
- Rider: (Japan) Tadayuki Okada
- Time: 1:26.141
Podium
- First: (Japan) Tadayuki Okada
- Second: (Australia) Mick Doohan
- Third: (Spain) Àlex Crivillé

250cc
Pole position
- Rider: (Italy) Max Biaggi
- Time: 1:27.438
Fastest lap
- Rider: (Italy) Max Biaggi
- Time: 1:28.256
Podium
- First: (Italy) Max Biaggi
- Second: (Japan) Tohru Ukawa
- Third: (France) Olivier Jacque

125cc
Pole position
- Rider: (Spain) Jorge Martínez
- Time: 1:34.393
Fastest lap
- Rider: (Italy) Valentino Rossi
- Time: 1:34.044
Podium
- First: (Italy) Valentino Rossi
- Second: (Japan) Kazuto Sakata
- Third: (Spain) Jorge Martínez

The 1997 Indonesian motorcycle Grand Prix was the fourteenth round of the 1997 Grand Prix motorcycle racing season. It took place on 28 September 1997 at the Sentul International Circuit.

== 500 cc classification ==
Pos.	Rider	Team	Manufacturer	Time/Retired	Points
1	(Japan) Tadayuki Okada	Repsol YPF Honda Team	Honda	43:22.010	25
2	(Australia) Mick Doohan	Repsol YPF Honda Team	Honda	+0.069	20
3	(Spain) Àlex Crivillé	Repsol YPF Honda Team	Honda	+10.991	16
4	(Japan) Nobuatsu Aoki	Rheos Elf FCC TS	Honda	+11.783	13
5	(Japan) Norifumi Abe	Yamaha Team Rainey	Yamaha	+12.193	11
6	(Spain) Carlos Checa	Movistar Honda Pons	Honda	+15.950	10
7	(Japan) Takuma Aoki	Repsol Honda	Honda	+30.887	9
8	(Spain) Sete Gibernau	Yamaha Team Rainey	Yamaha	+42.057	8
9	(United States) Kenny Roberts Jr.	Marlboro Team Roberts	Modenas KR3	+42.612	7
10	(Italy) Doriano Romboni	IP Aprilia Racing Team	Aprilia	+48.526	6
11	(Germany) Jürgen Fuchs	Elf 500 ROC	Elf 500	+50.816	5
12	(Australia) Daryl Beattie	Lucky Strike Suzuki	Suzuki	+50.886	4
13	(Australia) Peter Goddard	Lucky Strike Suzuki	Suzuki	+1:00.050	3
14	(Spain) Alberto Puig	Movistar Honda Pons	Honda	+1:05.583	2
15	(Australia) Kirk McCarthy	World Championship Motorsports	Yamaha	+1:05.945	1
16	(France) Regis Laconi	Team Tecmas	Honda	+1:06.675	
17	(Italy) Lucio Pedercini	Team Pedercini	ROC Yamaha	+1 Lap	
18	(Belgium) Laurent Naveau	Millet Racing	ROC Yamaha	+1 Lap	
Ret	(Netherlands) Jurgen van den Goorbergh	Team Millar MQP	Honda	Retirement	
Ret	(Italy) Luca Cadalora	Red Bull Yamaha WCM	Yamaha	Retirement	
Ret	(France) Jean-Michel Bayle	Marlboro Team Roberts	Modenas KR3	Retirement	
Ret	(France) Frederic Protat	Soverex FP Racing	Honda	Retirement	
Ret	(Spain) Juan Borja	Elf 500 ROC	Elf 500	Retirement	
Ret	(Brazil) Alex Barros	Honda Gresini	Honda	Retirement	

== 250 cc classification ==
Pos	Rider	Manufacturer	Time/Retired	Points
1	(Italy) Max Biaggi	Honda	41:35.549	25
2	(Japan) Tohru Ukawa	Honda	+6.592	20
3	(France) Olivier Jacque	Honda	+7.979	16
4	(Japan) Tetsuya Harada	Aprilia	+9.297	13
5	(Japan) Takeshi Tsujimura	TSR-Honda	+17.192	11
6	(Japan) Haruchika Aoki	Honda	+17.246	10
7	(Germany) Ralf Waldmann	Honda	+17.681	9
8	(Italy) Stefano Perugini	Aprilia	+45.850	8
9	(Argentina) Sebastian Porto	Aprilia	+49.571	7
10	(United Kingdom) Jeremy McWilliams	Honda	+59.835	6
11	(Italy) Cristiano Migliorati	Honda	+1:01.933	5
12	(Italy) Franco Battaini	Yamaha	+1:03.717	4
13	(Japan) Osamu Miyazaki	Yamaha	+1:05.791	3
14	(Italy) Loris Capirossi	Aprilia	+1:08.297	2
15	(Italy) Luca Boscoscuro	Honda	+1:21.512	1
16	(Switzerland) Oliver Petrucciani	Aprilia	+1 Lap	
17	(France) William Costes	Honda	+1 Lap	
Ret	(Italy) Giuseppe Fiorillo	Aprilia	Retirement	
Ret	(Spain) Luis d'Antin	Yamaha	Retirement	
Ret	(United Kingdom) Jamie Robinson	Suzuki	Retirement	
Ret	(Spain) Eustaquio Gavira	Aprilia	Retirement	
Ret	(Spain) José Luis Cardoso	Yamaha	Retirement	
Ret	(Japan) Noriyasu Numata	Suzuki	Retirement	
Ret	(Spain) Emilio Alzamora	Honda	Retirement	

== 125 cc classification ==
Pos	Rider	Manufacturer	Time/Retired	Grid	Points
1	(Italy) Valentino Rossi	Aprilia	41:14.511	4	25
2	(Japan) Kazuto Sakata	Aprilia	+3.028	3	20
3	(Spain) Jorge Martinez	Aprilia	+5.238	1	16
4	(Japan) Noboru Ueda	Honda	+8.369		13
5	(Japan) Tomomi Manako	Honda	+8.929	2	11
6	(Japan) Masaki Tokudome	Aprilia	+10.999	6	10
7	(Italy) Gianluigi Scalvini	Honda	+9.313		9
8	(Japan) Youichi Ui	Yamaha	+9.476		8
9	(Australia) Garry McCoy	Aprilia	+24.580	7	7
10	(Italy) Roberto Locatelli	Aprilia	+30.581	8	6
11	(Japan) Masao Azuma	Honda	+30.605		5
12	(Italy) Gino Borsoi	Yamaha	+31.029		4
13	(Italy) Lucio Cecchinello	Honda	+31.096		3
14	(France) Frederic Petit	Honda	+31.117		2
15	(Germany) Steve Jenkner	Aprilia	+32.467		1
16	(Spain) Angel Nieto Jr	Aprilia	+32.853		
17	(Spain) Enrique Maturana	Yamaha	+33.003		
18	(Malaysia) Shahrol Yuzy	Honda	+33.504		
19	(Spain) Josep Sarda	Honda	+56.451		
20	(Czech Republic) Jaroslav Hules	Honda	+56.520		
21	(Japan) Yoshiaki Katoh	Yamaha	+59.346		
Ret	(Indonesia) Rudi Arianto	Yamaha	Retirement		
Ret	(Indonesia) Irvan Octavianus	Yamaha	Retirement		
Ret	(Spain) Xavier Soler	Aprilia	Retirement		
Ret	(Germany) Dirk Raudies	Honda	Retirement		
Ret	(Indonesia) Ahmad Jayadi	Yamaha	Retirement		
Ret	(Germany) Manfred Geissler	Aprilia	Retirement		
Ret	(Italy) Mirko Giansanti	Honda	Retirement	5	
Ret	(Indonesia) Nasrul Arif	Honda	Retirement		

Previous race: 1997 Catalan Grand Prix	FIM Grand Prix World Championship; 1997 season	Next race: 1997 Australian Grand Prix
Previous race: 1996 Indonesian Grand Prix	Indonesian Grand Prix	Next race: 2022 Indonesian Grand Prix
