= 1997 British motorcycle Grand Prix =

(United Kingdom) 1997 British Grand Prix
Race details
- Race 11 of 15 races in the 1997 Grand Prix motorcycle racing season
- Date: 17 August 1997
- Official name: Sun British Grand Prix
- Location: Donington Park
- Course: Permanent racing facility; 4.023 km (2.500 mi)

500cc
Pole position
- Rider: (Australia) Mick Doohan
- Time: 1:32.872
Fastest lap
- Rider: (Australia) Mick Doohan
- Time: 1:32.856
Podium
- First: (Australia) Mick Doohan
- Second: (Japan) Tadayuki Okada
- Third: (Brazil) Alex Barros

250cc
Pole position
- Rider: (Italy) Loris Capirossi
- Time: 1:34.346
Fastest lap
- Rider: (Japan) Tetsuya Harada
- Time: 1:34.137
Podium
- First: (Germany) Ralf Waldmann
- Second: (Japan) Tetsuya Harada
- Third: (Italy) Loris Capirossi

125cc
Pole position
- Rider: (Japan) Youichi Ui
- Time: 1:39.713
Fastest lap
- Rider: (Italy) Valentino Rossi
- Time: 1:39.236
Podium
- First: (Italy) Valentino Rossi
- Second: (Japan) Masaki Tokudome
- Third: (Japan) Noboru Ueda

The 1997 British motorcycle Grand Prix was the eleventh round of the 1997 Grand Prix motorcycle racing season. It took place on 17 August 1997 at Donington Park.

== 500cc race report ==
This race was most notable for Mick Doohan's victory and subsequent fourth title conquest, the battle for the win between Mick Doohan and Tadayuki Okada and the fight for third position between Alex Barros and Luca Cadalora.

Mick Doohan is on pole - his eighth consecutive pole position of the year -, setting a time of 1:32.872 on the Saturday. In second place is Carlos Checa, third place is Alex Barros and fourth place is Tadayuki Okada. The second row of the grid consists of Doriano Romboni in fifth, Nobuatsu Aoki in sixth, Luca Cadalora in seventh and Kenny Roberts Jr. in eighth. Àlex Crivillé was still out of contention due to a fall at one of the free practice sessions at the Dutch round, sustaining serious tendon and bone damage as well as lesions of the blood vessels in his left wrist. His left thumb was badly injured. As a result, he has undergone an operation and has to wait until September to ride again.

All riders take off and do their usual warm-up lap before lining up in their respective grid slots. As the lights go out, both Barros and Checa get a good getaway heading into Redgate (Turn 1), Checa initially leading but getting overtaken upon entry. Norifumi Abe also has a fantastic start from eleventh on the grid to slot behind into third, then second place after Checa loses out. Okada is fourth and Doohan - who has a mediocre start - slots behind into fifth. Cadalora is sixth. At the Old Hairpin, Barros has already opened up a small gap to Abe. With Checa losing out after a good start, he is now seventh behind Takuma Aoki on the opening lap. Régis Laconi is already out of the race, distraught looking at his bike as the marshalls are taking care of it. At the end of Starkey's Straight, Okada makes a move on Abe and passes him for second place heading into The Esses (Turn 9). Checa also tries a move, going down the inside of Oaki and taking sixth place as a result. Doohan then does the same to the Japanese, gently going up his inside at the Melbourne Hairpin (Turn 10) to pass him for third.

On lap two, Barros leads the way but is already losing ground to Okada. The top six is as follows: Barros, Okada, Doohan, Abe, Cadalora and Checa. At the Old Hairpin, T. Aoki goes wide and loses metres to Checa. At Coppice (Turn 8), Okada has by now closed the gap to Barros and tries a move around the outside of the Brazilian but he holds on heading into The Esses. At the Melbourne Hairpin, Doohan then goes up the inside of teammate Okada and overtakes him for second spot.

Lap three and Doohan easily blasts past Barros for the lead at Wheatcroft Straight. At the exit of McLean's, Checa does a low-speed highside and crashes out of a strong fifth place. He slides onto the edge of the track and into the grass, then runs away from the crash site being assisted by the marshalls as he disappointingly puts his hands on his helmet, the other marshalls then recovering his bike. This now promotes N. Aoki to sixth place.

On lap four, Doohan is leading the way followed by Barros. Exiting the Melbourne Hairpin, he has a moment but does not lose any time.

Lap five and Okada has closed up fully on Barros at the end of Wheatcroft Straight but is not able to get by. Barros sets the fastest lap of the race. The top six is as follows: Doohan, Barros, Okada, Abe, Cadalora, and N. Aoki. At the end of Starkey's Straight, Okada goes side by side with Barros and takes second position. It's now a Repsol Honda 1–2.

On lap six, N. Aoki is closing up to the rear of Cadalora. Anthony Gobert on the Lucky Strike Suzuki is going slowly but also doing a wheelie, having to retire due to technical problems. Abe is also slowly reeling in Barros now.

Lap seven and Okada now sets the fastest lap and is closing the gap to Doohan. No overtakes happened at the front.

On lap eight, the top six is as follows: Doohan, Okada, Barros, Abe, Cadalora and N. Aoki. Okada has now almost caught up to the back of Doohan, with N. Aoki doing likewise to Cadalora.

Lap nine and Okada has closed the gap to his teammate at the Melbourne Hairpin. Exiting the hairpin, Doohan has a bit of a moment but does not lose any time or places from it.

On lap ten, the top six is as follows: Doohan, Okada, Barros, Abe, Cadalora and N. Aoki. Fourth place Abe is now being hunted down by Cadalora, himself also coming under pressure from N. Aoki as well.

Lap eleven and Juan Borja tries a move down the inside of T. Aoki at Redgate for eighth but isn't able to get by. Daryl Beattie has already passed the Japanese and is now seventh. At the end of Starkey's Straight, Alberto Puig slams on the brakes very late and almost goes wide entering The Esses.

On lap twelve, Doohan and Okada have pulled a considerable gap to Barros by now. The top six is as follows: Doohan, Okada, Barros, Abe, Cadalora and N. Aoki.

Lap thirteen and Doohan still leads with Okada right behind him. No overtakes happened at the front.

On lap fourteen, Abe has closed up to Barros for third place. Doohan's gap to Okada is +0.250 seconds.

Lap fifteen - the halfway point of the race - and Abe has now fully closed the gap to Barros. Okada's gap back to Barros is +4.429 seconds. At Starkey's Straight, Abe tries a move on the Brazilian but he defends well on the brakes, keeping the position entering The Esses.

On lap sixteen, Abe is right behind Barros at Wheatcroft Straight, then pulls out of the slipstream at the end of the straight and makes a late lunge to take third place upon entry of Redgate. However, Barros fights back right away: He stays very close at Hollywood (Turn 2) and goes up his inside at the entry of Craner Curves (Turn 3), making contact with Abe and forcing the Japanese to go straight on into the grass. He loses multiple places from it as a result but is able to stay on the bike. As a result, he has lost two places to Cadalora and N. Aoki and is now in sixth position.

Lap seventeen and the top six is as follows: Doohan, Okada, Barros, Cadalora, N. Aoki and Abe. Doohan's gap to Okada is now +0.326 seconds. Barros is now starting to come under pressure from Cadalora who is dragging N. Aoki with him as well.

On lap eighteen, Barros passes backmarker Laurent Naveau at the Wheatcroft Straight. Doohan sets the fastest lap as he still is being chased by Okada, though opening a small gap to him by now. N. Aoki is losing ground to Cadalora who is only closing the gap to Barros.

Lap nineteen and the top six is as follows: Doohan, Okada, Barros, Cadalora, N. Aoki and Beattie. At McLean's, Cadalora has now fully closed the gap to Barros. At the end of Starkey's Straight, Cadalora goes side by side with Barros, outbraking him and taking third entering The Esses. However, Cadalora runs a bit wide upon exit, allowing Barros to get back at him by diving down the inside at the Melbourne Hairpin, retaking the position. This has allowed N. Aoki to close up to the duo again.

On lap twenty, Cadalora goes past Barros at the end of the Wheatcroft Straight for third and is not able to get back at him this time around. However, Barros stays with Cadalora at McLean's and Coppice but loses out on the straight due to a lack of power. At Goddards (Turn 11), Okada makes a surprise lunge down the inside of teammate Doohan for first but runs wide and immediately gives back the position to Doohan.

Lap twenty-one and Okada makes another move on the Australian, going up his inside at Redgate and successfully taking the lead of the race.

On lap twenty-two, it is now Okada who leads the race, followed by Doohan in second. Third is now Cadalora, though he is still being harassed by Barros down in fourth. N. Aoki is also pretty close to the Brazilian. The top six is as follows: Okada, Doohan, Cadalora, Barros, N. Aoki and Beattie. Okada's gap back to Doohan is +0.421 seconds. Exiting Coppice, Barros is right behind Cadalorda, this time manages to stay close to the Italian at Starkey's Straight and makes a dive down his inside to retake third spot at The Esses.

Lap twenty-three and Cadalora closes up to Barros at Wheatcroft Straight but is not able to get past. He continues to stalk Barros all throughout the lap but is not able to get past. At the front, Okada is still leading with Doohan close behind him in second place.

On lap twenty-four, Cadalora closes up at Redgate as N. Aoki is starting to lose ground to the Italian again.

Lap twenty-five and Barros is coming under pressure from Cadalora again, using the Red Bull WCM Yamaha's superior power to get close, take a tighter line and go up the inside of Barros at Redgate for third. At the front, Doohan has overtaken Okada for the lead at the Old Hairpin, only to go wide and allow Okada to retake it entering Starkey's Bridge (Turn 5). Okada then in turn runs wide which gives Doohan the chance to pass entering Schwantz Curve (turn Turn 6). Okada is close at McLean's but with Doohan shutting the door on him, he is not able to make a move at Coppice.

On lap twenty-six, Puig has crashed out of the race, the rider walking unhurt to his bike as the marshalls recover it. Doohan slides his bike around Starkey's Bridge as Okada is doing everything he can to stay close to him. Cadalora has also passed Barros for third position again, the Brazilian still right behind him to try and retake it. Okada's gap to Cadalora is +17.654 seconds. As it looked like Barros was too far behind to make any sort of move, he makes an extremely late lunge up the inside of Cadalora at The Esses and somehow manages to get through. However, as Cadalora has a better exit out of the chicane, he goes past the Brazilian at the short straight before the Melbourne Loop and keeps third place. All the fighting has allowed N. Aoki to close up to the duo again.

Lap twenty-seven and N. Aoki goes past Barros on power at Wheatcroft Straight, taking fourth place away from him. Exiting the Old hairpin though, Barros is very close and retakes fourth by going up the inside of N. Aoki at Schwantz Curve. He then starts to slowly close the gap to Cadalora again.

On lap twenty-eight, Okada is still close to the rear of Doohan. The top six is as follows: Doohan, Okada, Cadalora, Barros, N. Aoki and Beattie. The gap Doohan has to Okada is +0.150 seconds. At the Melbourne Hairpin, Okada tries to go up the inside but backs out of it and almost slams into the back of his teammate. This allows Doohan to open up a small gap.

Lap twenty-nine, the penultimate lap, has started and Okada closes the gap to Doohan rather quickly, already practically behind him at the Old Hairpin. The top six is as follows: Doohan, Okada, Cadalora, Barros, N. Aoki and Beattie. Doohan's gap back to Okada is +0.399 seconds. Barros has managed to get by Cadalora and go up into third again.

Doohan crosses the line to start the final lap - lap thirty - with Okada close behind still. Barros looks behind to see how far behind Cadalora is at Wheatcroft Straight. Okada harasses Doohan all throughout the lap but thanks to his clever defending he manages to exit the last corner and cross the line to win the race - his tenth victory of the season and eleventh consecutive podium finish. Close second is Okada, followed by a jubilant Barros who does a wheelie upon crossing the line in third. Fourth is N. Aoki, fifth is Cadalora - who has faded towards the end - and sixth is Beattie.

Upon crossing the line, Doohan puts his fist up in the air in delight, then makes multiple hand gestures to signify his victory, looking back to see how close Okada was to him. Some Australian fans who have invaded the track give Doohan the Australian flag, the running back to the side as the marshalls look on and Doohan continues to ride, waving the flag proudly.

On the podium, Barros is the first to appear, followed by Okada and a happy Doohan as the crowd cheers for him upon entry. He has a short on that says "Mick Doohan 94 95 96 97 world champion". He puts his arm in the air, making a "1" gesture with his finger to show everyone he has won yet again. He waves at the crowd also briefly, then holds up his helmet as a sign of victory. The trophies get handed out, the first one to receive it being Barros, holding it up in the air happily. Next up is Okada, then Doohan who holds his trophy up with both hands in jubilant fashion. The Australian national anthem plays for Doohan. As it stops, the fans cheer and clap loudly for the now four-time world champion. All the riders receive a rosary on their necks, then the champagne gets handed out by the podium girls. As they do so, Doohan cheekily sprays one of them, then sprays Okada and then sprays it up in the air, with Okada also spraying one of the girls himself. Barros goes on to immediarly spray it on the crowd, Doohan also spraying some on him. Okada returns as he briefly went away from the podium and also sprays it on the crowd, with Doohan then spraying the cameraman also.

Doohan's victory now means he has an unassailable lead over his championship rivals, making him the 1997 world champion.

== 500cc classification ==
Pos.	Rider	Team	Manufacturer	Time/Retired	Points
1	(Australia) Mick Doohan	Repsol YPF Honda Team	Honda	46:55.378	25
2	(Japan) Tadayuki Okada	Repsol YPF Honda Team	Honda	+0.231	20
3	(Brazil) Alex Barros	Honda Gresini	Honda	+24.403	16
4	(Japan) Nobuatsu Aoki	Rheos Elf FCC TS	Honda	+28.291	13
5	(Italy) Luca Cadalora	Red Bull Yamaha WCM	Yamaha	+31.346	11
6	(Australia) Daryl Beattie	Lucky Strike Suzuki	Suzuki	+32.543	10
7	(Italy) Doriano Romboni	IP Aprilia Racing Team	Aprilia	+44.472	9
8	(Spain) Juan Borja	Elf 500 ROC	Elf 500	+47.045	8
9	(Japan) Norifumi Abe	Yamaha Team Rainey	Yamaha	+48.157	7
10	(Japan) Takuma Aoki	Repsol Honda	Honda	+1:03.529	6
11	(United States) Kenny Roberts Jr.	Marlboro Team Roberts	Modenas KR3	+1:14.190	5
12	(Australia) Kirk McCarthy	World Championship Motorsports	Yamaha	+1:18.323	4
13	(Netherlands) Jurgen van den Goorbergh	Team Millar MQP	Honda	+1:19.937	3
14	(United Kingdom) Jay Vincent	Padgett's	Honda	+1:21.385	2
15	(Germany) Jürgen Fuchs	Elf 500 ROC	Elf 500	+1 Lap	1
16	(Italy) Lucio Pedercini	Team Pedercini	ROC Yamaha	+1 Lap	
17	(France) Frederic Protat	Soverex FP Racing	Honda	+1 Lap	
18	(Belgium) Laurent Naveau	Millet Racing	ROC Yamaha	+1 Lap	
Ret	(Spain) Alberto Puig	Movistar Honda Pons	Honda	Retirement	
Ret	(Spain) Sete Gibernau	Yamaha Team Rainey	Yamaha	Retirement	
Ret	(Australia) Anthony Gobert	Lucky Strike Suzuki	Suzuki	Retirement	
Ret	(Spain) Carlos Checa	Movistar Honda Pons	Honda	Retirement	
Ret	(France) Régis Laconi	Team Tecmas	Honda	Retirement	

== 250 cc classification ==
Pos	Rider	Manufacturer	Time/Retired	Points
1	(Germany) Ralf Waldmann	Honda	42:50.897	25
2	(Japan) Tetsuya Harada	Aprilia	+0.133	20
3	(Italy) Loris Capirossi	Aprilia	+11.496	16
4	(France) Olivier Jacque	Honda	+15.138	13
5	(Japan) Tohru Ukawa	Honda	+17.746	11
6	(Japan) Takeshi Tsujimura	TSR-Honda	+35.701	10
7	(Italy) Stefano Perugini	Aprilia	+43.881	9
8	(Japan) Haruchika Aoki	Honda	+1:01.520	8
9	(Argentina) Sebastian Porto	Aprilia	+1:08.890	7
10	(Japan) Noriyasu Numata	Suzuki	+1:19.156	6
11	(Italy) Franco Battaini	Yamaha	+1:19.981	5
12	(United Kingdom) Scott Smart	Honda	+1:22.583	4
13	(Spain) José Luis Cardoso	Yamaha	+1:22.983	3
14	(United Kingdom) John McGuinness	Aprilia	+1 Lap	2
15	(United Kingdom) Callum Ramsay	Honda	+1 Lap	1
16	(United Kingdom) Steve Sawford	Honda	+1 Lap	
17	(United Kingdom) Gary May	Yamaha	+1 Lap	
18	(United States) Kurtis Roberts	Honda	+1 Lap	
Ret	(Japan) Osamu Miyazaki	Yamaha	Retirement	
Ret	(United Kingdom) Jamie Robinson	Suzuki	Retirement	
Ret	(Italy) Giuseppe Fiorillo	Aprilia	Retirement	
Ret	(Spain) Luis d'Antin	Yamaha	Retirement	
Ret	(Italy) Cristiano Migliorati	Honda	Retirement	
Ret	(Spain) Eustaquio Gavira	Aprilia	Retirement	
Ret	(Switzerland) Oliver Petrucciani	Aprilia	Retirement	
Ret	(France) William Costes	Honda	Retirement	
Ret	(Spain) Emilio Alzamora	Honda	Retirement	
Ret	(Italy) Max Biaggi	Honda	Retirement	

== 125 cc classification ==
Pos	Rider	Manufacturer	Time/Retired	Points
1	(Italy) Valentino Rossi	Aprilia	43:43.254	25
2	(Japan) Masaki Tokudome	Aprilia	+1.780	20
3	(Japan) Noboru Ueda	Honda	+8.499	16
4	(Australia) Garry McCoy	Aprilia	+8.874	13
5	(Italy) Roberto Locatelli	Honda	+16.258	11
6	(Japan) Yoshiaki Katoh	Yamaha	+16.997	10
7	(Italy) Mirko Giansanti	Honda	+20.571	9
8	(Japan) Tomomi Manako	Honda	+25.710	8
9	(France) Frederic Petit	Honda	+26.416	7
10	(Italy) Lucio Cecchinello	Honda	+28.467	6
11	(Italy) Gianluigi Scalvini	Honda	+28.467	5
12	(Germany) Manfred Geissler	Aprilia	+34.913	4
13	(Japan) Masao Azuma	Honda	+43.963	3
14	(United Kingdom) Darren Barton	Honda	+52.302	2
15	(Spain) Enrique Maturana	Yamaha	+57.571	1
16	(Germany) Steve Jenkner	Aprilia	+1:04.748	
17	(Italy) Ivan Goi	Aprilia	+1:05.183	
18	(United Kingdom) Fernando Mendes	Honda	+1:14.106	
19	(Spain) Angel Nieto Jr	Aprilia	+1:15.683	
20	(United Kingdom) Jason Davies	Honda	+1:31.795	
21	(United Kingdom) Alan Green	Honda	+1 Lap	
Ret	(United Kingdom) Chris Burns	Honda	Retirement	
Ret	(United Kingdom) Steve Patrickson	Honda	Retirement	
Ret	(Spain) Josep Sarda	Honda	Retirement	
Ret	(Japan) Kazuto Sakata	Aprilia	Retirement	
Ret	(Germany) Dirk Raudies	Honda	Retirement	
Ret	(Czech Republic) Jaroslav Hules	Honda	Retirement	
Ret	(Italy) Gino Borsoi	Yamaha	Retirement	
Ret	(Japan) Youichi Ui	Yamaha	Retirement	
Ret	(Spain) Jorge Martinez	Aprilia	Retirement	

Previous race: 1997 Rio de Janeiro Grand Prix	FIM Grand Prix World Championship; 1997 season	Next race: 1997 Czech Republic Grand Prix
Previous race: 1996 British Grand Prix	British Grand Prix	Next race: 1998 British Grand Prix
