= Honda NSR500 =

500 cc class racing motorcycle

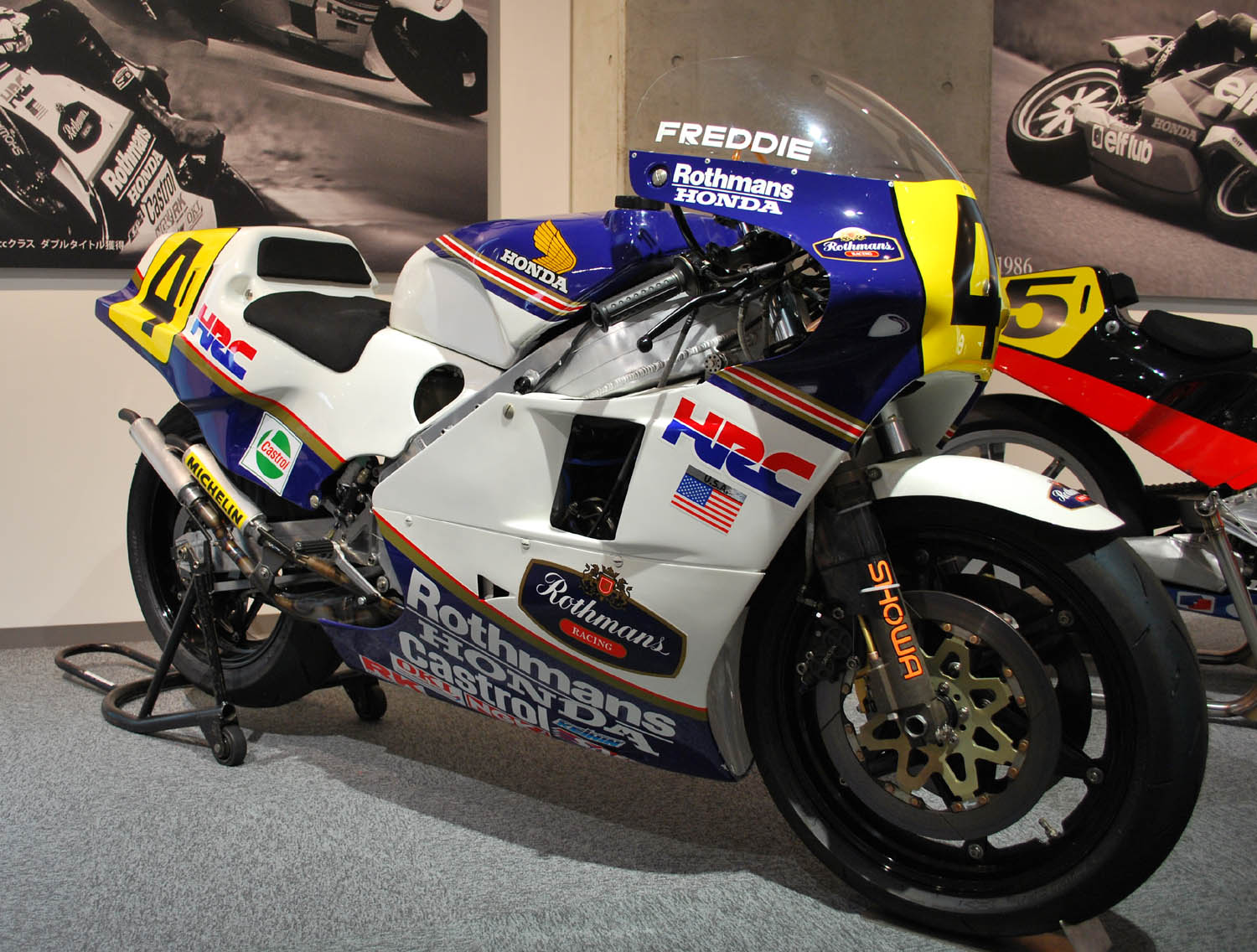
- Manufacturer: Honda Racing Corporation
- Production: 1984–2002
- Predecessor: Honda NS500
- Successor: Honda RC211V
- Engine: 499 cc (30.5 cu in) two-stroke 112° V4
- Bore / stroke: 54 mm × 54.5 mm (2.13 in × 2.15 in)
- Power: over 185 hp (138 kW)
- Wheelbase: 1,400 mm (55 in)
- Weight: 131 kg (289 lb) (dry)
- Fuel capacity: 32 L (7.0 imp gal; 8.5 US gal)
- Related: Honda NSR500V

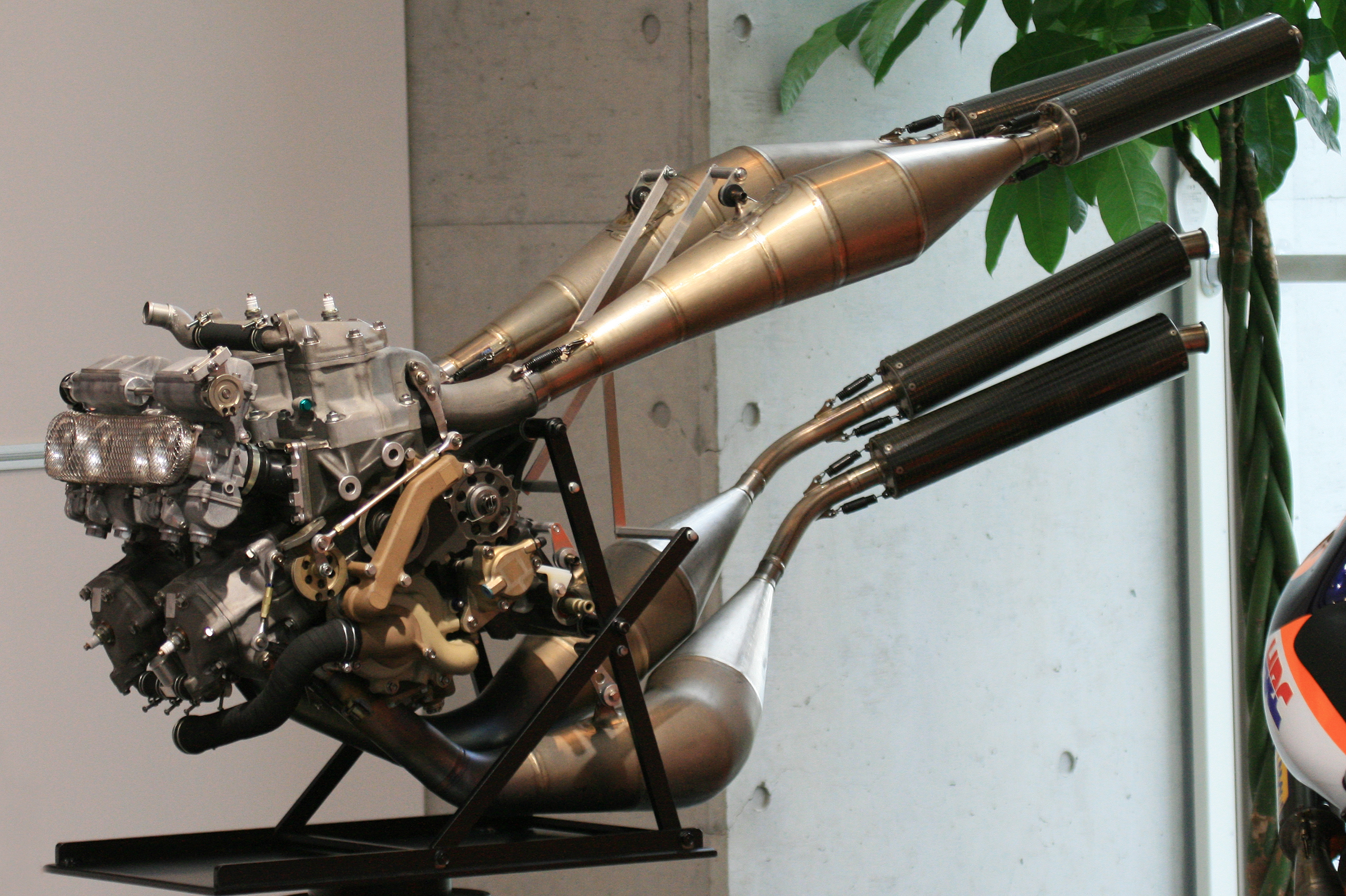
1997 Honda NSR500 engine: Liquid-cooled 499 cc V4. 6-speed transmission. 185 PS / 12,000 rpm

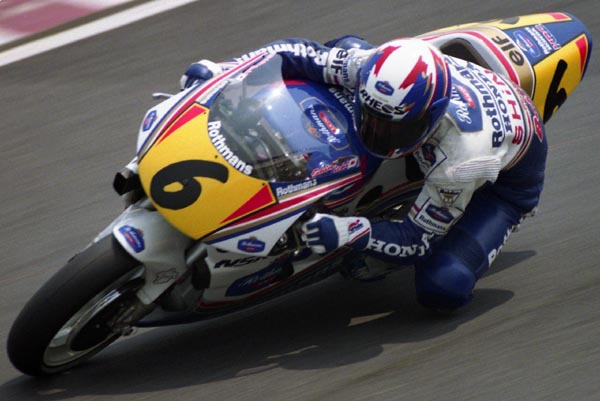
Shinichi Itoh, riding his Honda NSR500 in the 1993 Japanese Grand Prix

The Honda NSR500 is a road racing motorcycle created by HRC (Honda Racing Corporation) and debuted in 1984 for the Grand Prix motorcycle racing's 500 cc class. Honda won ten 500cc World Championships with the NSR500 from 1984 to 2002, with six in a row from 1994 to 1999. With more than 100 wins to its credit, the NSR500 is the most dominant force in modern Grand Prix motorcycle racing.

== 1984–1987 ==
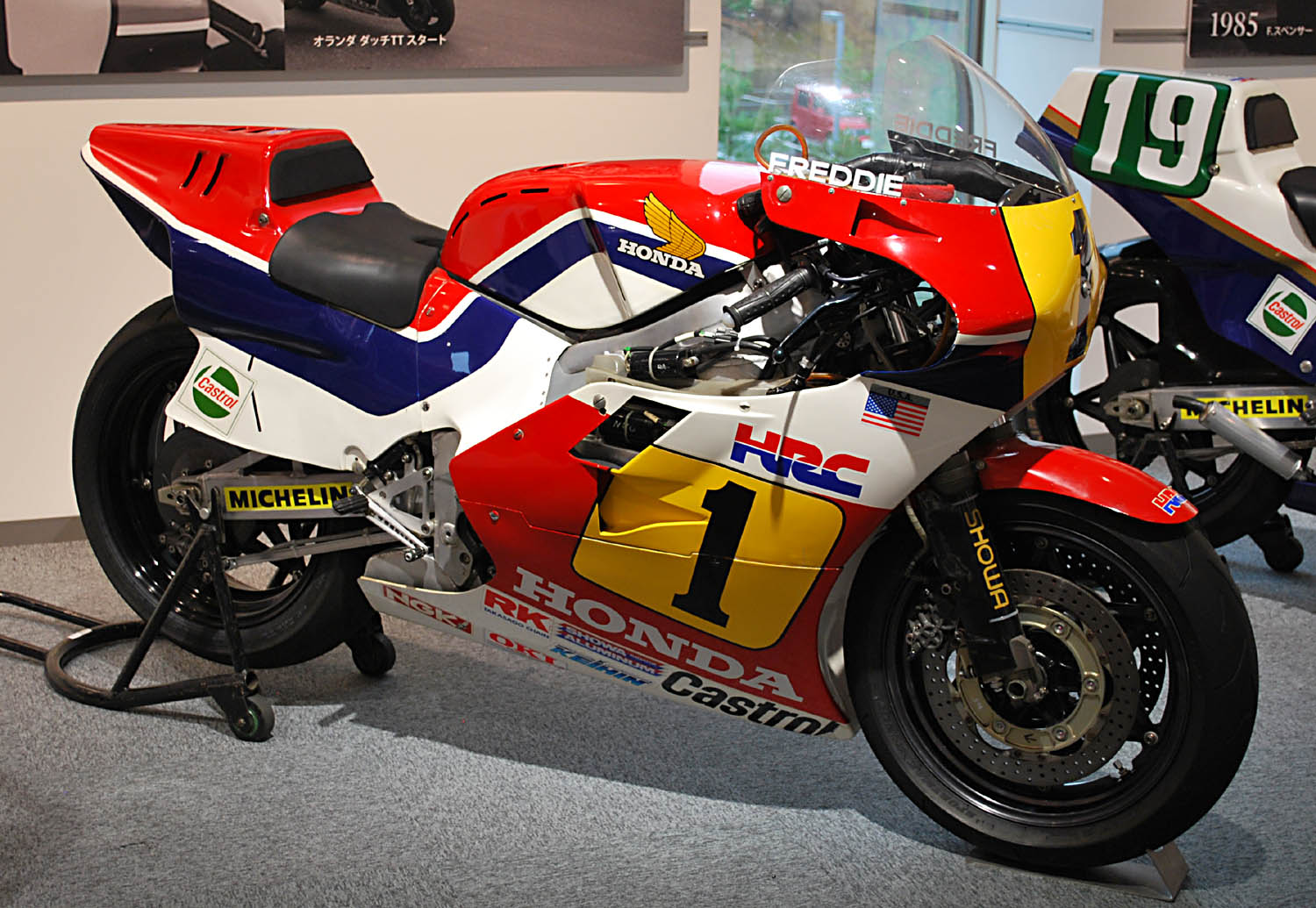
1984 Honda NSR500

Designed to succeed Honda's first two-stroke Grand Prix racer, the NS500 triple, NSR500 debuted in 1984 for the Grand Prix motorcycle racing's 500 cc class. Building on lessons learned from its three-cylinder predecessor, the new 90° V4 used a single crankshaft, making it lighter and more compact than its dual-crankshaft adversaries. Though tormented by unorthodox chassis technology in its first season, the NSR500 evolved to clinch Honda's second 500 cc GP title in 1985. Opening the V-angle to 112 degrees in 1987 made room for a quartet of 36 mm Keihin carburetors between the cylinders where they could be fed more cool air. The new arrangement also let the engine exhale more efficiently through its four artfully intertwined expansion chambers. By year's end, Honda won a third 500 World Championship with Australian rider Wayne Gardner.

== 1988–1989 ==
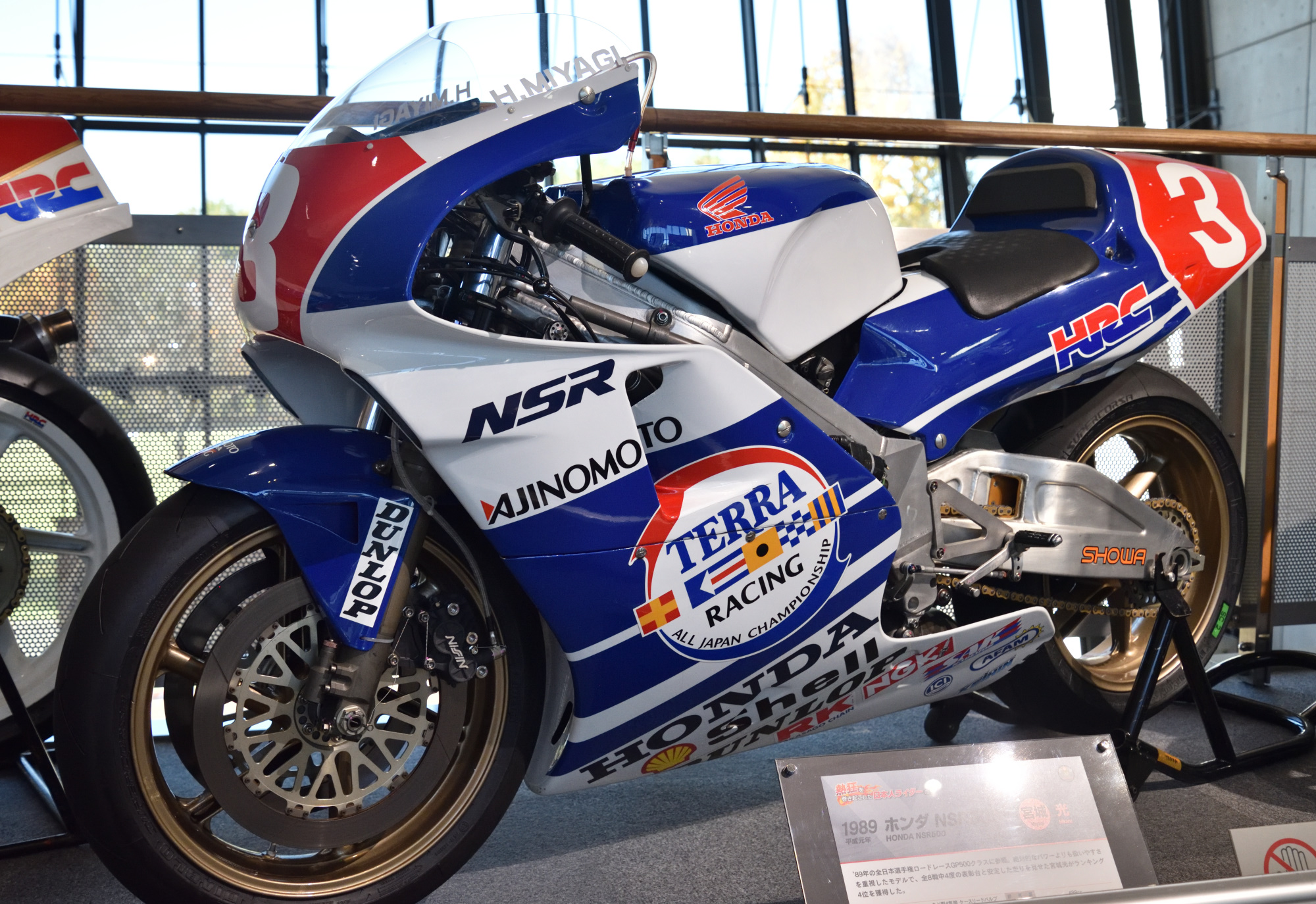
1989 Honda NSR500

Entirely redesigned for 1988, the NSR500 got a stiffer, twin-spar aluminium chassis and various engine changes. The changes made to the 1988 bike made it somewhat problematic for the riders, especially in the first half of the season. Wayne Gardner had a hard time in defence of his 1987 World Championship and although he eventually got on top of the bike's problems and won three races in a row in mid-season (Dutch TT, Belgium and Yugoslavia), he could only finish second in the championship behind the Yamaha of Eddie Lawson. The main complaints about the 1988 NSR500 was that the engine, while undoubtedly the most powerful in 500cc racing, was very 'peaky' and had to run up high in the rev range to get the best out of it. Also the suspension geometry of the bike wasn't as good as in 1987 and the bike was noticeably harder to handle through the turns than the rival Yamaha YZR500 and Suzuki's new RGV500. While the engine's power advantage was seen on the faster tracks such as Suzuka (which is actually owned by Honda), Assen, Spa and Paul Ricard, on tighter tracks such as Jarama and Jerez it was off the pace due to its handling.

More improvements gave the 1989 NSR500 upwards of 165 horsepower (123 kW) at 12,000 rpm — essentially doubling the output of the 1966 Honda RC181 Grand Prix four-stroke. Capable of well over 190 miles per hour (310 km/h), the 1989 bikes had more top speed and acceleration than anything else on the track. To contain all that muscle, the stiffer, twin-spar aluminum chassis used a curved, gull-wing-type swingarm to accommodate more efficient expansion chambers. The 1989 bike was also the first Grand Prix bike to incorporate an early form of a quick shifter, although it only allowed clutchless no lift upshifts. The result was an unforgiving, but brutally fast, package that earned Honda a fourth 500 cc World Championship in 1989 thanks to Eddie Lawson who had joined the factory backed Rothmans team alongside Gardner and young Australian Mick Doohan.

== 1990–1998 ==
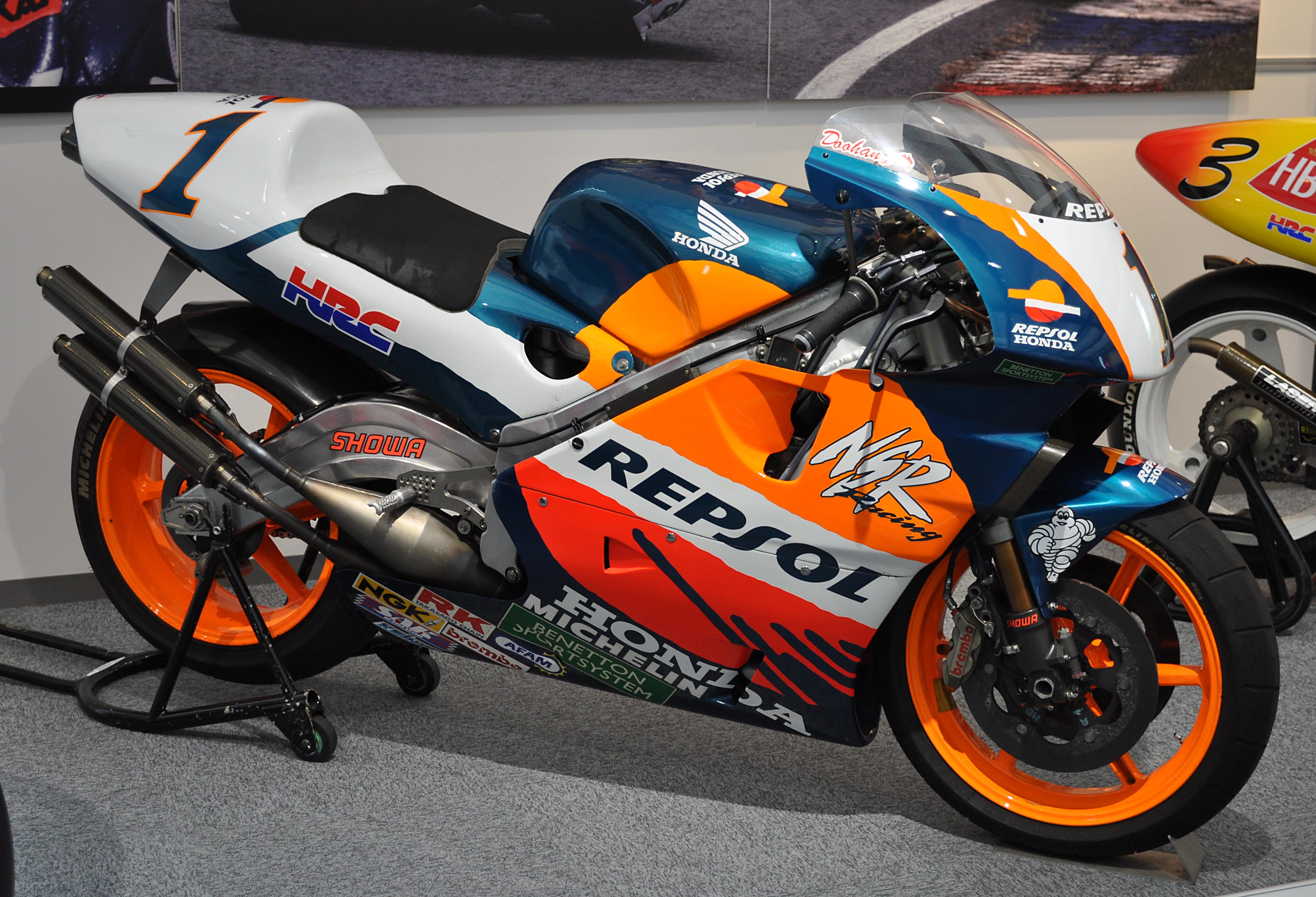
1995 Honda NSR500

With the 499 cc V-4 now producing more than 200 horsepower (150 kW), chassis development, sophisticated engine management and an Australian named Mick Doohan made the NSR500 a legend in the 1990s. Extensive testing in 1991 led to a new aluminum chassis patterned on the successful RVF750 endurance racer. Honda unveiled a revolutionary idea with a 1992 V4 that was timed to fire all four cylinders within 65-70 degrees of crankshaft rotation — the so-called "Big-Bang" engine. Along with a balance shaft that neutralized the single crankshaft engine's gyroscopic effects, the 1992 NSR500 was a breakthrough. Emphasizing acceleration over sheer speed, Doohan used this engine to win five of the first seven 500 Grand Prix races of 1992. Although a badly broken leg denied Doohan's bid for the 1992 World Championship, he would not be denied for long. Beginning in 1994, Doohan and the NSR500 won five consecutive 500 cc World Championships. Winning 12 of 15 races in 1997, he broke a single-season win record that was set in 1972. Combining for 54 total 500 Grand Prix wins, no man and machine in modern history had dominated the 500 World Championship so thoroughly. From around 1997, the NSR500 again featured the older "Screamer" engine in some factory racers, with Mick Doohan preferring the higher outright power of this design despite it being much more difficult to harness.

== 1999–2002 ==
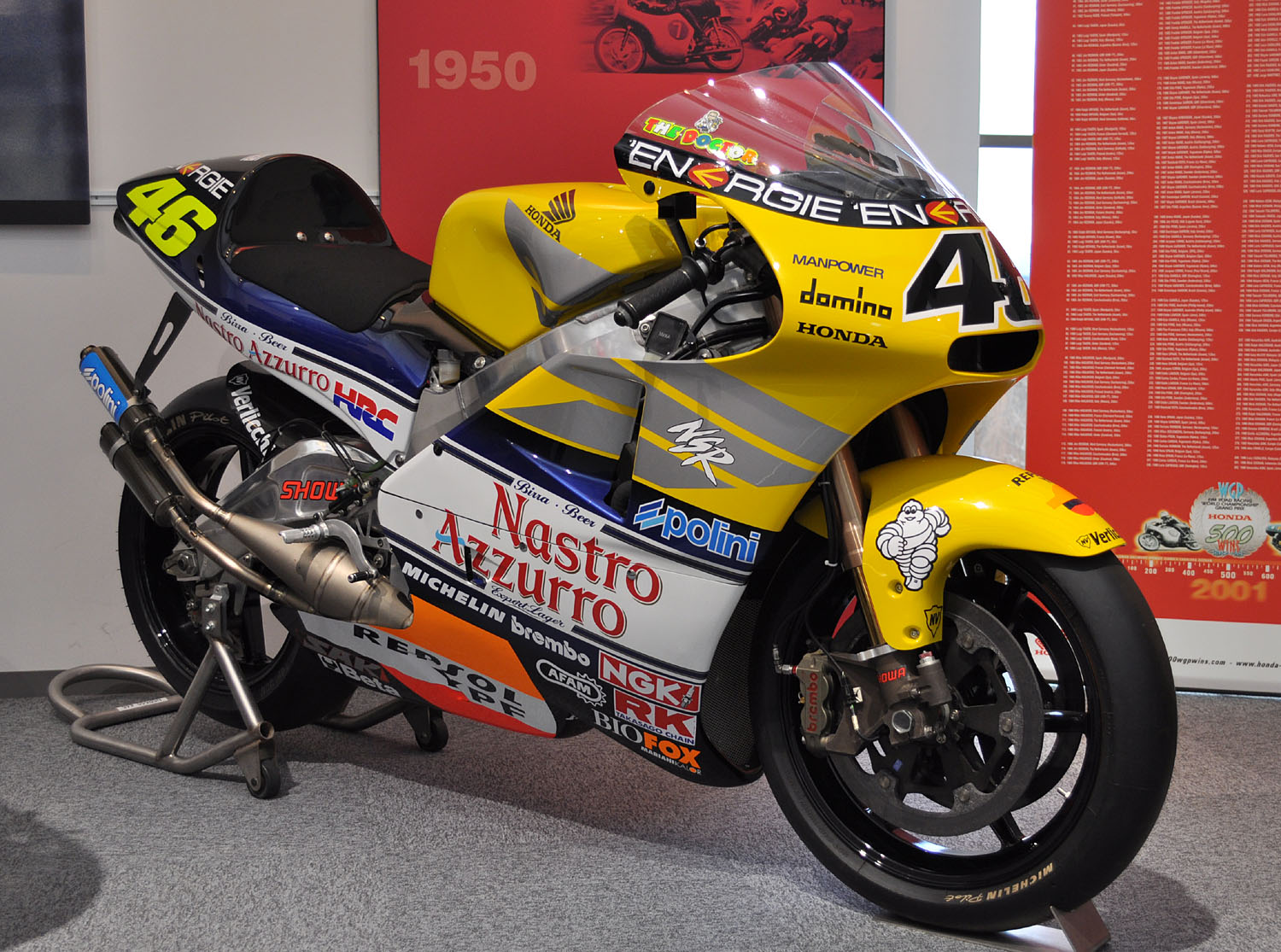
2001 Honda NSR500 ridden by Valentino Rossi

Constant development and ever-increasing sophistication sharpened the NSR500's edge, earning Honda two more 500cc World Championships, with Àlex Crivillé in 1999 and again with Valentino Rossi in 2001.

For the 2002 season, technical regulations for the World Championship motorcycle road racing 500cc class were changed drastically, with four-stroke engines being allowed to grow up to 990cc and up to six cylinders. The name of the class was changed to MotoGP and was limited to race prototypes only. Because of these changes, Honda introduced the RC211V in 2002 to race alongside the NSR500. The larger displacement RC211V and other four-stroke bikes dominated the series and the NSR500 was eventually phased out of the class along with all other two-stroke motorcycles.

== Championships won ==
Riders World Championships won with the NSR500:

- 1985: Freddie Spencer
- 1987: Wayne Gardner
- 1989: Eddie Lawson
- 1994: Mick Doohan
- 1995: Mick Doohan
- 1996: Mick Doohan
- 1997: Mick Doohan
- 1998: Mick Doohan
- 1999: Àlex Crivillé
- 2001: Valentino Rossi

== See also ==
- Honda NSR500V
- Aprilia RSW-2 500
- Cagiva C593
- Suzuki RGV500
- Yamaha YZR500
- ELF 500 ROC
- Sabre V4
