= Jürgen Fuchs =

Jürgen Fuchs may refer to:

- Jürgen Fuchs (motorcyclist), German motorcyclist
- Jürgen Fuchs (writer), East German writer and dissident
- Jürgen Fuchs, physicist
