= ELF 500 ROC =

- Manufacturer: ELF
- Production: 1996-1997
- Class: 500 cc
- Engine: Swissauto 499.3 cc (30.47 cu in) two-stroke 108° V4
- Bore / stroke: 54 mm × 54.5 mm (2.13 in × 2.15 in)
- Power: over 160 hp (120 kW) @ 12,500 rpm
- Wheelbase: 1,410 mm (56 in)
- Weight: 130 kg (290 lb) (dry)
- Fuel capacity: 34 L (7.5 imp gal; 9.0 US gal)

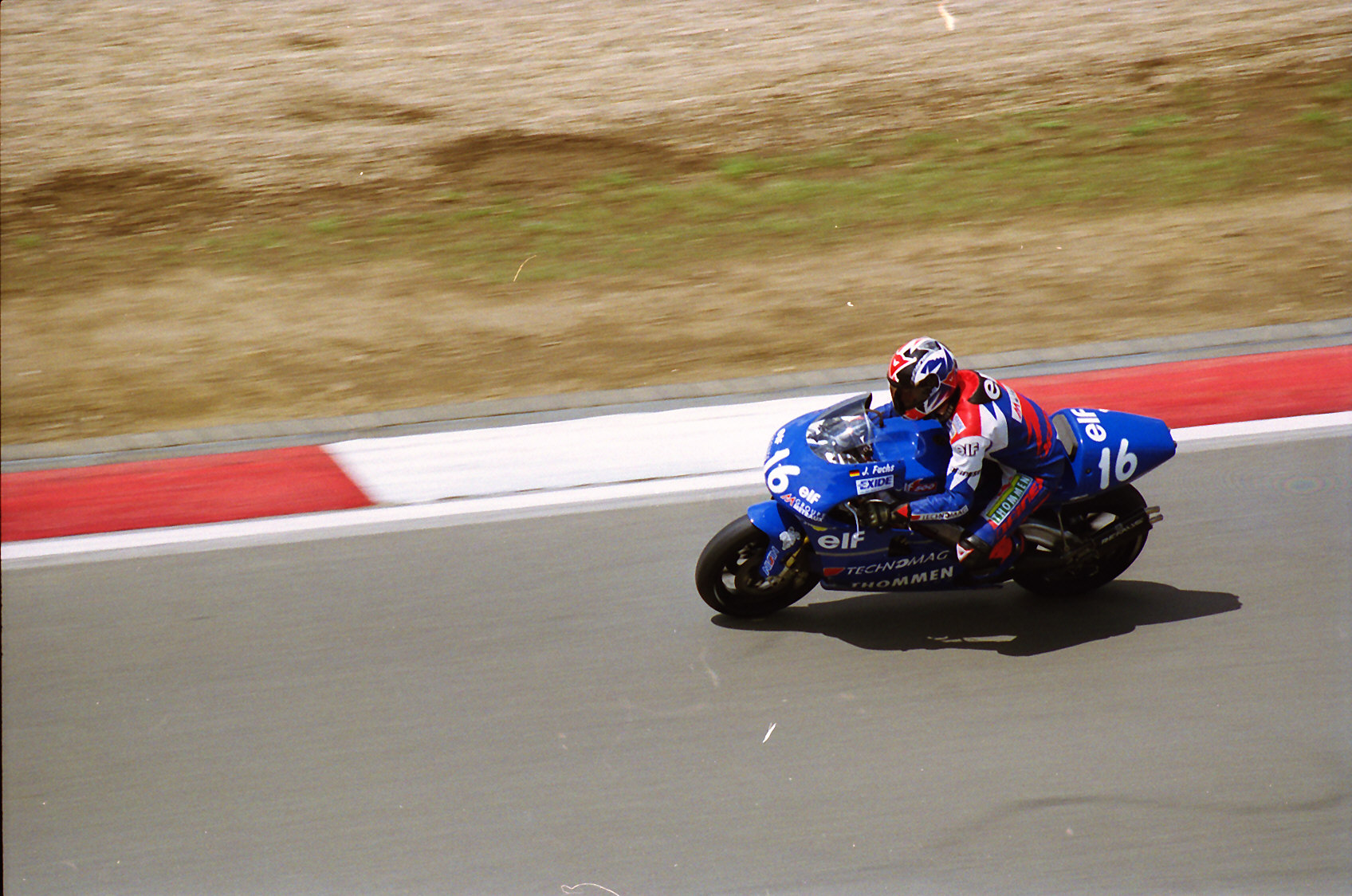
Jürgen Fuchs, riding his ELF 500 ROC at the 1997 German Grand Prix

The ELF 500 ROC was a motorcycle that competed in the 1996 and 1997 500 cc Road Racing World Championship.

== ELF 500 ROC ==
A new European motorcycle made its debut under the Elf banner in 1996. The engine was a Swissauto 500 cc two-stroke V4 engine, designed as a compact and powerful unit which could be used in both sidecar racing outfits and solo bikes. It utilised a single balance shaft and a 6-speed cassette-type gearbox. Its crankshaft design allowed for the engine to fire at different angles, allowing the rider to choose either "big-bang" or "screamer" engine characteristics. The engine was housed in a frame designed by Serge Rosset's small ROC firm, based at Annemasse in France. The bike competed in the 1996 and 1997 500 cc World Championships.

=== 1996 ===
Sponsored by soft drink giant Pepsi, the team consisted of Adrian Bosshard and Juan Borja. Over the course of the season William Costes stood in for Bosshard, Chris Walker later replaced Bosshard, and Marti Craggill stood in for Walker at the final round. At its debut race in Malaysia, Borja scored an impressive 10th place. The bike would go on to record 8 point-scoring finishes out of 15 races, its highest placing being that of 8th by Borja at Donington Park. The motorcycle proved fast but unreliable as it notched up a string of non-finishes. Borja finished the season on 34 points, Walker on 2 points.

=== 1997 ===
Borja remained in the team, and was joined by new teammate Jürgen Fuchs. Reliability was still a concern but there was improvement and the bikes finished 13 times in the points – 6 times inside the Top 10. Its highpoint came in Brazil, with Fuchs scoring a best finish of 6th. Borja finished the season on 37 points, Fuchs on 28.

The ELF team ceased GP competition at the end of 1997, but the bikes returned to the grid in 1998 in the form of the MuZ 500.

ELF 500 ROC Specifications
Engine Type:	2-stroke water-cooled V4
Displacement:	499.27 cc
Max Power:	160 + BHP
Carburation Type:	4 Dell Orto VHSB35 flat valve carbs
Ignition:	CDI digital
Clutch:	Dry multiple discs
Transmission:	6-speed cassette type
Final Drive:	Chain
Frame Type:	Twin spar aluminum
Suspension:	Front: Inverted telescopic forks Rear: Ohlins mono shock
Tyres:	Michelin
Wheel:	Front: 3.5 x 17 inches Rear: 6.0 x 17 inches
Brake System:	Front: Carbon composite disc (320 mm), Nissin 4 pot calipers Rear: steel disc (220 mm)
Overall Length:	2040 mm
Overall Width:	490 mm
Wheelbase:	1410 mm
Weight:	129 kg (without tank)
Fuel Tank:	35L

== See also ==
- Honda NSR500
- Aprilia RSW-2 500
- Cagiva C593
- Suzuki RGV500
- Yamaha YZR500
- Paton PG500RC
- Sabre V4
