= Sabre V4 =

- Manufacturer: Sabre Sports Ltd; Felsted; Essex; CM6 3LF; UK
- Production: 2001
- Class: 500 cc
- Engine: Yamaha YZR500 two-stroke V4 500 cc

The Sabre V4 was a 500 cc two-stroke motorcycle that competed in the 2001 500 cc World Championship. It utilised a Yamaha YZR500 engine which was housed in a custom made frame.

== Background ==
Sabre Sports had been offered a slot in the 250 cc World Championship midway through the 1999 season, to replace the Docshop 250 team. Their performance led to the offer being extended to the 500 cc class for 2000. During this year the team ran a Honda NSR500V and while they had respectable results, realised that a V4 was needed to run further up the order.

== Machine development ==
Unable to lease a V4 from any manufacturer, the team decided to build its own bike around a 1994 YZR500 (OWF9) engine, a version generally regarded as one of the best of the YZR designs. Standard YZR crankcases and gearbox were used and custom engine internals, exhausts and ignition systems were added letting the engine output some 175 BHP. The chassis was designed and manufactured by Sabre Sports Ltd. Due to the team's success and presentation in the 250 class, Sabre were invited to step up to the premier 500 cc class for 2000. Shane Norval was contracted and two new NSR500 V-twins were purchased from Honda. The season started well with Shane getting some good results but at the Qatar GP he was knocked off by Max Biaggi and broke his arm. Over the next two GPs Ron Haslam and Callum Ramsey rode for the team. Phil Giles rode for the remainder of the season, with moderate success.

Having campaigned the V-twin in 2000 Sabre realised they needed more powerful V4 machinery. Unable to lease a factory bike the team set about building their own. Over the winter of 2000/2001 the Sabre V4 was designed and built in the team's new premises in Essex, England. A chassis was built based on the Yamaha YZR of 1994, noted by many as the firm's best design to date. YZR crankcases and gearbox were used and custom made engine internals, pipes and ignition were fitted.

Johan Stigefelt was contracted to ride the new machine. The Sabre V4 was wheeled out for the first IRTA test at Estoril, Portugal, in April 2001. The bike performed beyond the team's expectations and lapped within two seconds of the factory bikes.

Throughout the 2001 season the bike was a great success with Sabre consistently the best performing privateer team. The bike was developed further at each Grand Prix but the tide was turning against two stroke machinery. Plans were announced to phase out the 500 cc bikes and replace them with 990 cc four stroke machines. Early indications were that the new four stroke machines would outperform even the best of the factory two strokes and the future looked bleak for a small team on a limited budget. More bad news was to follow though as only eleven teams would be franchised for the next five years. With Sabre being the last 500 cc team to join the World Championships a grid place was not offered for the following year.

== Racing history ==
Johan Stigefelt was contracted to ride the Sabre during 2001 and put in some good performances, regularly being the best privateer in the field. The machine scored points on three occasions, its best being a 13th at the Portuguese Grand Prix. It finished the Constructors Championship in fifth place on 6 points (3 points ahead of the Pulse team).

Whilst development of the Sabre was ongoing throughout the year, the future of two-stroke 500 cc racing was in severe doubt with the impending arrival in the class of four-stroke 990 cc machines, which were to eventually make the two strokes redundant. The FIM also declared that only eleven teams would be allocated grid slots for the next five years. As the Sabre team was the most recent team to join and the class was already fully subscribed, they were not allocated a grid slot for 2002.

The Sabre V4 was later used at the Macau Grand Prix in November 2002 where rider Chris Palmer scored 14th position, after qualifying in 20th. In 2003, World Championship Motorsports used it for three races (ridden by José David de Gea) in the 2003 season for World Championship Motorsports after FIM banned the team's original Harris-built motorcycles on engine grounds, until new engines were ready for the Portuguese Grand Prix.

== Specifications ==
Sabre V4 Specifications
Engine Type:	2-stroke water-cooled 500 cc V4
Max Power:	claimed 175 BHP
Final Drive:	Chain
Suspension:	Front: Inverted telescopic Rear: Öhlins mono shock
Tyres:	Dunlop
Brake System:	Front: Carbon composite disc, Nissin 4 pot calipers Rear: steel disc

== See also ==
- Honda NSR500
- Aprilia RSW-2 500
- Cagiva C593
- Suzuki RGV500
- Yamaha YZR500
- ELF 500 ROC
