= Cagiva C593 =

Racing motorcycle

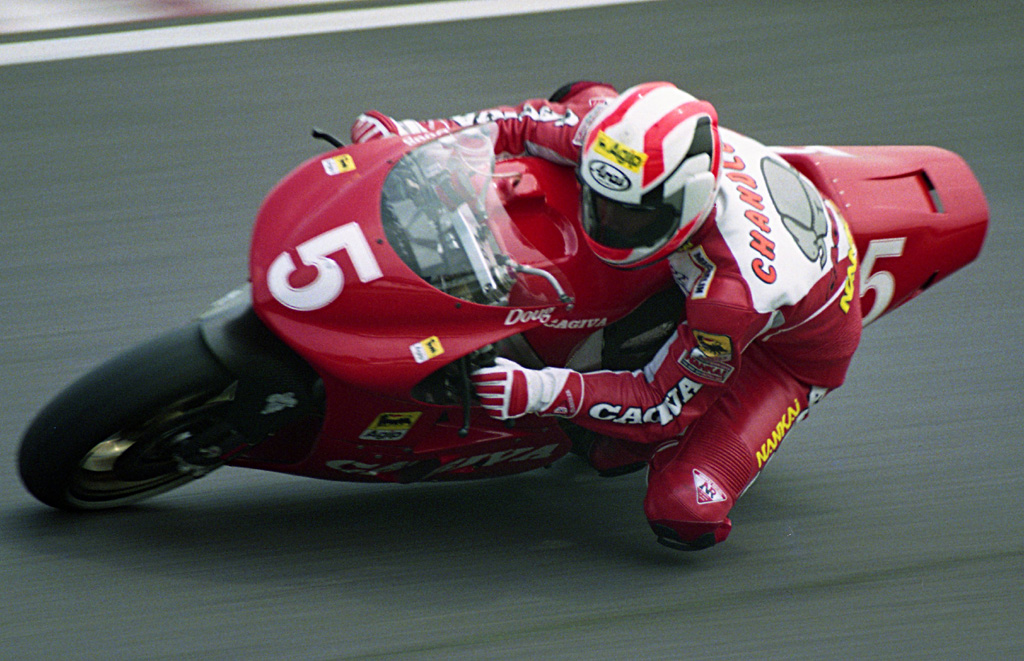
- Doug Chandler, riding the Cagiva C593 at the 1993 Japanese Grand Prix
- Manufacturer: Cagiva
- Production: 1993
- Predecessor: Cagiva C592
- Successor: Cagiva C594
- Class: 500 cc
- Engine: 498.5 cc (30.42 cu in) two-stroke, four-cylinder with an 80° V-angle
- Bore / stroke: 56 mm × 50.6 mm (2.20 in × 1.99 in)
- Power: (at the wheel) 180 hp (130 kW) @ 12,700 rpm
- Torque: 103 N⋅m (76 lbf⋅ft) @ 12,000 rpm
- Transmission: Chain
- Wheelbase: 1,390 mm (55 in)
- Weight: 130 kg (290 lb) (dry)
- Fuel capacity: 21 L (4.6 imp gal; 5.5 US gal)

The Cagiva C593 was a racing motorcycle made by Cagiva, which was used in the 500cc class of Grand Prix motorcycle racing during the 1993 season. The name is formed by an amalgamation of words and letters, namely the "C", "5" and "93". The "C" stands for the company (Cagiva), the "5" stands for the class the company races in as well as the engine capacity (500) and the "93" stands for the season the bike raced in (1993). The bike replaced the C592 model used in 1992 and was replaced by Cagiva's last model, the C594.

== Description ==
This bike had respectable characteristics, such as the various titanium expansions (which were reduced in thickness) and the carbon silencers (which allowed a reduction in weight), also as with the previous model, this one adopts a distribution of the outbreaks called the "Big Bang" (introduced during the creation of the previous bike), but it is increased in maximum power compared to previous year's bike even if it loses slightly in linearity of progression where there is an irregularity when opening the electronically controlled CTS valves, requiring a use at higher engine speeds.

With this bike, Cagiva tried two different layouts for the air intakes and the swingarm: The first was put on the bike used by John Kocinski and was placed by the central position grip on the front fairing and the carbon fiber swingarm while the second, put on the bikes of Doug Chandler and Mat Mladin adopted the side grips on the sides of the bike, similar to the C592, while on this version of the bike the aluminum swingarm with upper reinforcement truss of the previous model is used.

== Season progress ==
Just like last year, the Cagiva riders continued to be competitive, despite not being as strong as other manufacturers like Yamaha, Honda or Suzuki. Doug Chandler frequently rode the machine into the points and managed to score a third place podium, even battling with Wayne Rainey's Yamaha for second, at the season opener in Australia.

The high point however, came when John Kocinski joined the team late in the season after the 250cc Factory Suzuki team had fired him and went on to win Cagiva's first and only race of the season at the 1993 United States Grand Prix as the rivals on the seemingly better machines crashed out. Mat Mladin, replacement rider Juan Garriga and wildcard rider Carl Fogarty scored a decent haul of points as well, the team scoring a total of 199 points and getting two podiums - one of which was a win.

== Specifications ==
Cagiva C593 Specifications
Engine
Engine type:	Four-cylinder, 2-stroke with an 80° V-angle
Displacement:	498.51 cm^{3} (Bore 56.0 x Stroke 50.6 mm)
Ignition:	Magneti Marelli CDI
Fuel System:	
Fuel:	
Lubricants:	
Lubrication system:	
Data recording:	
Maximum power:	
Maximum speed:	
Exhaust:	
Transmission
Type:	6-speed removable sequential (always in gear)
Primary drive:	Gear
Clutch:	Dry multi-disc
Final drive:	Chain
Chassis and running gear
Frame type:	Double diagonal beam in light alloy
Front suspension:	Upside down 43mm fully adjustable Öhlins fork
Rear suspension:	Fully adjustable Öhlins shock absorber
Front/rear wheels:	Marchesini rims
Front/rear tyres:	Front: 120/60 17 / Rear: 180/50 17 Michelin tyres
Front brake:	320mm or 290mm double carbon disc with 4-piston Brembo caliper
Rear brake:	210mm single disc with 2-piston Brembo caliper
Weight:	130 kg / 287 lbs
Fuel capacity:	21 Liters

== See also ==
- Honda NSR500
- Aprilia RSW-2 500
- Suzuki RGV500
- Yamaha YZR500
- ELF 500 ROC
- Sabre V4
