= Aprilia RSW-2 500 =

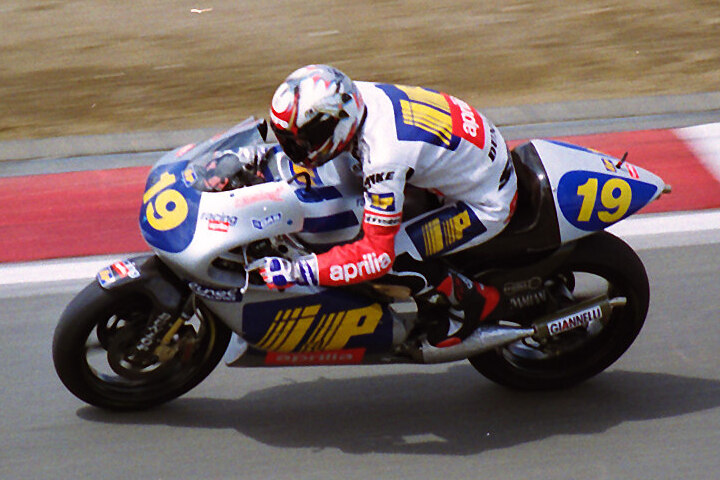
- Doriano Romboni on a RSW-2 500 at the 1997 German Grand Prix
- Manufacturer: Aprilia
- Production: 1994-2000
- Successor: Aprilia RS Cube
- Engine: 498 cc (30.4 cu in) two-stroke engine 90° V2
- Bore / stroke: 72.8 mm × 60 mm (2.87 in × 2.36 in)
- Compression ratio: 14:1
- Power: 145 hp (108 kW) @ 12,000 rpm
- Wheelbase: 1,400 mm (55 in)
- Weight: 110 kg (240 lb) (dry)
- Fuel capacity: 26 L (5.7 imp gal; 6.9 US gal)
- Related: Aprilia RSA 250

The Aprilia RSW-2 500 (also known as the RSW 500) was a racing motorcycle made by Aprilia, which raced in the 500cc class of the Grand Prix motorcycle racing, starting from 1994 until 2000 (with an absence in 1998).

== History ==
The chief designer of the Aprilia racing division, Jan Witteveen, made some comparative calculations between the cornering performance obtained in the MotoGP from the 500 and 250cc bikes and he found that the latter managed to get less travel time than the bikes of the premier class thanks to the greater speed allowed by their chassis. Therefore, he thought that if a 250 had a more powerful engine available to recover the disadvantage in acceleration and top speed along the straights, he would also have had the opportunity to compete against the bikes of the upper class. With the weight advantage guaranteed by the regulation (105 kg minimum weight for the two-cylinder and 130 kg for the four cylinders), here the Dutch engineer went to work to prove on the field the goodness of his theory.

Initially the RSW-2 500 was a larger version of the motorcycle used by the Noale team in the 250 class (the Aprilia RSV 250), whose capacity was initially brought to 410 cm^{3}; towards the end of the 1996 season it was raised to 430 cm^{3}, then in the middle of the 1997 season it was again raised to 460 cm^{3}. The bike was ridden by Doriano Romboni.

In 1998, the bike was not deployed because of the study of a custom engine, which allowed Aprilia to return in 1999 with a 500 cm^{3} engine ridden by Tetsuya Harada, with the RAVE valve to control the electronically controlled exhaust.

In 2000 the Aprilia brought two bikes on the grid, led by Harada (nº 31) and Jeremy McWilliams (nº 99). This last evolution had an inclined aluminum double beam frame, a 42 mm upside-down Öhlins fork and APS progressive system with an Öhlins shock absorber on a carbon swingarm, in which both suspensions were fully adjustable. The braking system was equipped with a double carbon disc at the front and a single 190 mm steel disc at the rear and the wheel rims were made of magnesium alloy.

The RSW-2 500 was not very successful in the premier class; although it was a very agile motorcycle (with a total weight of 110 kg, similar to the Honda NSR500, against the 130 kg of the 4 cylinders), it never managed to compete seriously with the 4 cylinders. The bike had a power of about 140 horsepower at 11,500 rpm, compared to the 200 hp of the 4 cylinders; the last models produced were equipped with an injector for indirect injection.

In 2000, Aprilia decided to pull out of the 500cc class. In the 7 years of the RSW-2 500 project, the bike managed to gain 5 podiums and 2 fastest laps, the last of which came in the 2000 British motorcycle Grand Prix.

After the closure of the RSW-2 500 project, Aprilia re-appeared in the premier class in 2002 with the introduction of the MotoGP class (which had replaced the 500cc class), with the new Aprilia RS Cube.

== See also ==
- Honda NSR500
- Kawasaki KR500
- Cagiva C593
- Suzuki RGV500
- Yamaha YZR500
- ELF 500 ROC
- Sabre V4
- Bimota V Due
