= Suzuki RGV500 =

Suzuki RGV-Γ 500
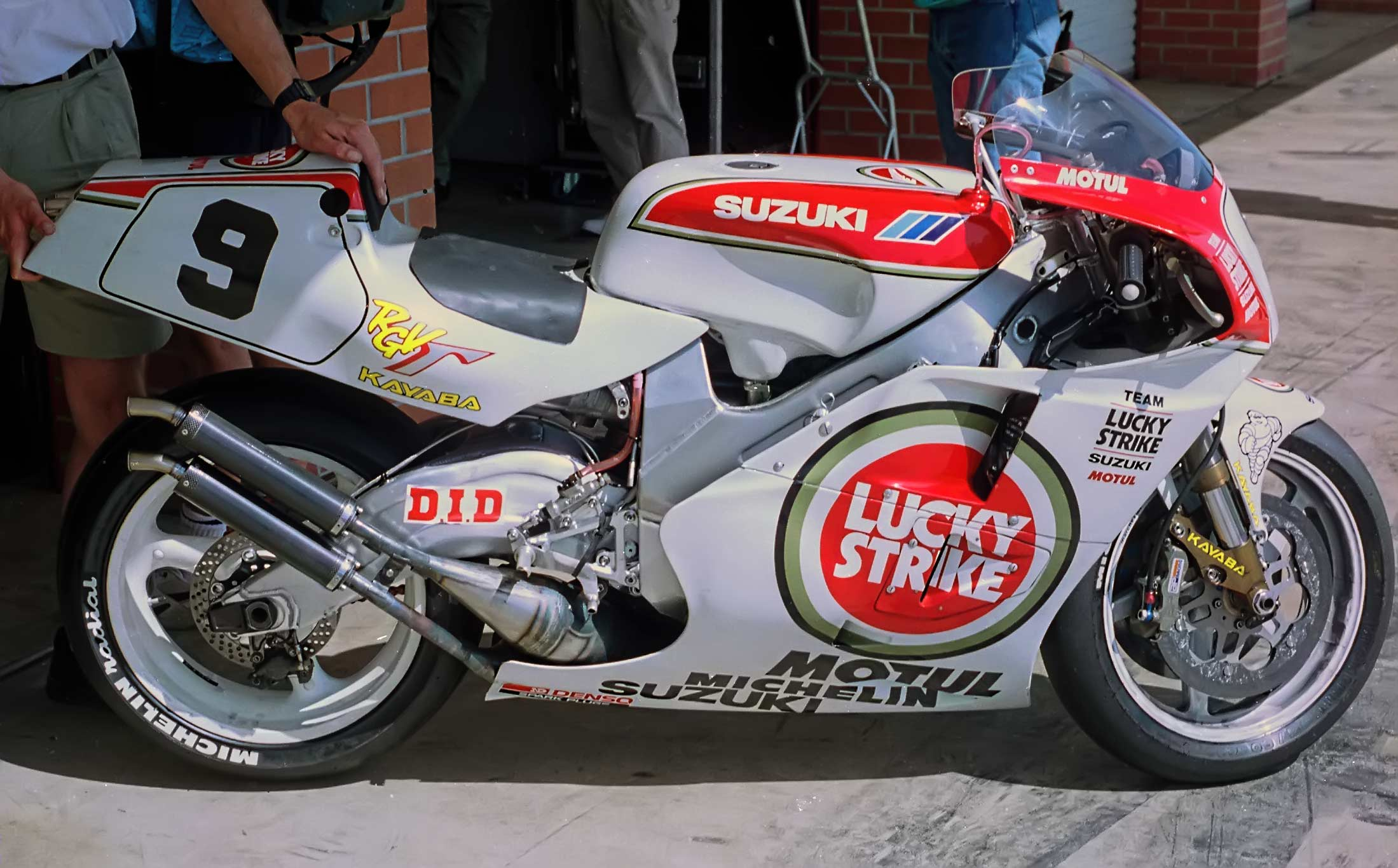
- The Suzuki RGV500 of Alex Barros, pictured at the 1993 Australian Grand Prix.
- Manufacturer: Suzuki
- Production: 1986-2001
- Predecessor: Suzuki RG Γ 500
- Successor: Suzuki GSV-R
- Engine: 499.3 cc (30.47 cu in) two-stroke 80° V4
- Bore / stroke: 54 mm × 54.5 mm (2.13 in × 2.15 in)
- Power: 185 hp (138 kW) @ 12,500 rpm
- Wheelbase: 1,400 mm (55 in)
- Weight: 130 kg (290 lb) (dry)
- Fuel capacity: 32 L (7.0 imp gal; 8.5 US gal)
- Related: Suzuki RGV250

The Suzuki RGV-Γ 500 was a racing motorcycle manufactured by Suzuki from 1986 to 2001 for competition in the Grand Prix motorcycle racing series. The motorcycle was powered by a 499.3 cc two stroke engine.

Suzuki factory racing team rider Kevin Schwantz rode the RGV500 to its first Grand Prix victory at the 1988 Japanese Grand Prix. It won its first 500 cc world championship in 1993 when Schwantz outscored Wayne Rainey and Mick Doohan to win the title. This was the most successful period in the motorcycle's history. The Suzuki suited Schwantz's riding style, as he often pushed beyond the limit of the machine, which often led to Schwantz crashing as often as he won.

The Suzuki was always slower than its opposition, as both the Yamaha and especially the Honda were much faster in a straight line; to compensate for this, Schwantz set the RGV up so it would compensate in the braking zones, and in the corners, allowing the Suzuki to slipstream the machines in front. This style of riding was famously quoted by Schwantz stating that he would "See God, then brake".

Other riders failed to adapt their style to the Suzuki, talent such as Doug Chandler and Alex Barros. However many did manage the Suzuki well such as Daryl Beattie who finished second overall in 1995 and Niall Mackenzie. Outside the Grand Prix championship, Didier de Radiguès won the 1991 Macau Grand Prix using the RGV500.

Kenny Roberts Jr was another who was successful on the RGV. After finishing second in 1999, Roberts became Suzuki's last 500 cc World Champion in 2000.

The RGV500 was replaced with the Suzuki GSV-R for 2002.

== Successes ==
- 2 World Championships (Kevin Schwantz in 1993 and Kenny Roberts Jr in 2000)
- 37 races won (Kevin Schwantz 25, Kenny Roberts Jr 8, Daryl Beattie 2, Alex Barros 1, Sete Gibernau 1)

== See also ==
- Honda NSR500
- Aprilia RSW-2 500
- Cagiva C593
- Yamaha YZR500
- ELF 500 ROC
- Sabre V4
