= Vittorio Scatola =

Italian motorcycle racer

- Nationality: Italian
- Born: 25 January 1959 (age 67); Piedimonte Matese, Italy
Motorcycle racing career statistics
500cc World Championship
Active years	1986–1990, 1994
Manufacturers	Paton, Suzuki, Honda
1994 championship position	NC (0 pts)
Starts / Wins / Podiums / Poles / F. laps / Points; 24 / 0 / 0 / 0 / 0 / 1
Superbike World Championship
Active years	1989–1993, 1997
Manufacturers	Honda, Bimota, Yamaha, Kawasaki
Championships	0
1997 championship position	NC (0 pts)
Starts / Wins / Podiums / Poles / F. laps / Points; 25 / 0 / 0 / 0 / 0 / 12

Vittorio Scatola (born 25 January 1959) is an Italian motorcycle racer. He raced in Grand Prix racing between 1986 and 1994, scoring a single point at the Nations Grand Prix in 1989.

== Career statistics ==
=== Grand Prix motorcycle racing ===
==== Races by year ====
(key) (Races in bold indicate pole position) (Races in italics indicate fastest lap)

Year	Class	Bike	1	2	3	4	5	6	7	8	9	10	11	12	13	14	15	Pos.	Pts
1986	500cc	Paton	SPA	NAT; Ret	GER	AUT	YUG	NED	BEL	FRA	GBR	SWE	RSM; Ret					NC	0
1987	500cc	Paton	JPN	SPA	GER	NAT; 21	AUT	YUG; Ret	NED	FRA; 16	GBR	SWE	CZE	RSM; Ret	POR	BRA	ARG	NC	0
1988	500cc	Paton	JPN	USA	SPA	EXP	NAT; Ret	GER	AUT	NED; DNS	BEL	YUG						NC	0
1988	500cc	Suzuki											FRA; Ret	GBR	SWE	CZE	BRA	NC	0
1989	500cc	Suzuki	JPN	AUS	USA	SPA	NAT; Ret											NC	0
1989	500cc	Honda						GER; 18	AUT	YUG; Ret	NED	BEL	FRA; DNQ	GBR	SWE	CZE	BRA	NC	0
1990	500cc	Paton	JPN	USA	SPA; Ret	NAT; 15	GER; 16	AUT	YUG; Ret	NED; Ret	BEL; Ret	FRA; Ret	GBR	SWE	CZE	HUN	AUS	35th	1
1994	500cc	Paton	AUS; 24	MAL; DNS	JPN	SPA; Ret	AUT; DNQ	GER; DNQ	NED; 19	ITA; Ret	FRA	GBR	CZE	USA	ARG; Ret	EUR; Ret		NC	0

=== Superbike World Championship ===
==== Races by year ====
(key) (Races in bold indicate pole position) (Races in italics indicate fastest lap)

Year	Make	1		2		3		4		5		6		7		8		9		10		11		12		13		Pos.	Pts
Year	Make	R1	R2	R1	R2	R1	R2	R1	R2	R1	R2	R1	R2	R1	R2	R1	R2	R1	R2	R1	R2	R1	R2	R1	R2	R1	R2	Pos.	Pts
1989	Honda	GBR	GBR	HUN	HUN	CAN	CAN	USA	USA	AUT	AUT	FRA; Ret	FRA; Ret	JPN	JPN	GER; DNQ	GER; DNQ	ITA	ITA	AUS	AUS	NZL	NZL					NC	0
1990	Bimota	SPA	SPA	GBR	GBR	HUN	HUN	GER	GER	CAN	CAN	USA	USA	AUT	AUT	JPN	JPN	FRA	FRA	ITA; Ret	ITA; Ret	MAL	MAL	AUS	AUS	NZL	NZL	NC	0
1991	Bimota	GBR	GBR	SPA	SPA	CAN	CAN	USA	USA	AUT	AUT	SMR; DNS	SMR; DNS	SWE	SWE	JPN	JPN	MAL	MAL									50th	11
1991	Yamaha																			GER; Ret	GER; 23	FRA	FRA					50th	11
1991	Kawasaki																							ITA; 12	ITA; 9	AUS	AUS	50th	11
1992	Kawasaki	SPA; Ret	SPA; Ret	GBR; Ret	GBR; Ret	GER	GER	BEL	BEL	SPA	SPA	AUT; 22	AUT; 16	ITA; Ret	ITA; Ret	MAL	MAL	JPN	JPN	NED; 26	NED; Ret	ITA; 15	ITA; Ret	AUS	AUS	NZL	NZL	72nd	1
1993	Yamaha	IRL	IRL	GER	GER	SPA; 20	SPA; Ret	SMR; DNS	SMR; DNS	AUT	AUT	CZE	CZE	SWE	SWE	MAL	MAL	JPN	JPN	NED	NED	ITA; DNQ	ITA; DNQ	GBR	GBR	POR	POR	NC	0
1997	Honda	AUS	AUS	SMR; Ret	SMR; DNS	GBR	GBR																					NC	0
1997	Kawasaki							GER; 22	GER; 21																			NC	0
1997	Yamaha									ITA; DNQ	ITA; DNQ	USA	USA	EUR	EUR	AUT	AUT	NED	NED	SPA	SPA	JPN	JPN	INA	INA			NC	0
