= Andreas Leuthe =

- Nationality: Luxembourgish
- Born: May 22, 1964 (age 62) Luxembourg
- Retired: 1994

Andreas Leuthe (born May 22, 1964) is a Luxembourgish former motorcycle racer. He competed in the Grand Prix motorcycle racing series from 1984 to 1994. His best season was in 1990 when he finished in 25th position overall in the 500cc category.

Leuthe also owns Leuthe GmbH, based in Thayngen, which is now the exclusive KL Motorrad importer for Switzerland.

== Career statistics ==
=== Grand Prix motorcycle racing ===
==== Race results by year ====
Points system from 1969 to 1987:

Position	1st	2nd	3rd	4th	5th	6th	7th	8th	9th	10th
Points	15	12	10	8	6	5	4	3	2	1

Points system from 1988 to 1992:

Position	1st	2nd	3rd	4th	5th	6th	7th	8th	9th	10th	11th	12th	13th	14th	15th
Points	20	17	15	13	11	10	9	8	7	6	5	4	3	2	1

Points system since 1993:

Position	1st	2nd	3rd	4th	5th	6th	7th	8th	9th	10th	11th	12th	13th	14th	15th
Points	25	20	16	13	11	10	9	8	7	6	5	4	3	2	1

Year	Class	Bike	1	2	3	4	5	6	7	8	9	10	11	12	13	14	15	16	Points	Position
1986	500cc	Honda	ESP 20	NAC Ret	ALE 24	AUT DNS	YUG 20	NED DNQ	BEL Ret	FRA -	GBR -	SWE -	RSM 16						0	-
1987	500cc	Honda	JAP -	ESP -	ALE DNQ	NAC Ret	AUT Ret	YUG 19	NED DNQ	FRA Ret	GBR DNQ	SWE -	TCH -	RSM DNQ	BY -	BRA -	ARG -		0	-
1988	500cc	Suzuki	JAP -	USA Ret	ESP Ret	EXP Ret	NAC DNQ	ALE Ret	AUT 16	NED Ret	BEL 27	YUG 21	FRA DNQ	GBR Ret	SWE DNQ	TCH DNS	BRA -		0	-
1989	500cc	Librenti Corse	JAP -	AUS -	USA -	ESP Ret	NAC 9	ALE DNQ	AUT -	YUG Ret	NED Ret	BEL -	FRA Ret	GBR 20	SWE Ret	TCH 23	BRA Ret		7	31st
1990	500cc	Librenti Corse	JAP -	USA -	ESP 14	NAC Ret	ALE 12	AUT -	YUG -	NED -	BEL -	FRA -	GBR 14	SWE Ret	TCH Ret	HUN Ret	AUS -		8	25th
1991	500cc	VRP	JAP -	AUS -	USA -	ESP DNQ	ITA DNQ	ALE -	AUT DNQ	EUR Ret	NED DNQ	FRA DNQ	GBR 15	RSM 18	TCH Ret	HUN 14	AUS -		3	29th
1992	500cc	VRP / Harris-Yamaha	JAP DNQ	AUS -	ESP -	ITA Ret	EUR DNQ	ALE DNQ	NED Ret	HUN 19	FRA -	GBR Ret	BRA 21	RSA 23					0	-
1994	500cc	Yamaha	JAP 23	MAL 21	ITA -	ESP 18	AUT Ret	ALE 17	NED Ret	FRA 17	GBR 20	CZE Ret	USA Ret	ARG DNQ	EUR Ret				0	-
