= 1987 Yugoslavian motorcycle Grand Prix =

(Socialist Federal Republic of Yugoslavia) 1987 Yugoslavian Grand Prix
Race details
- Race 6 of 15 races in the 1987 Grand Prix motorcycle racing season
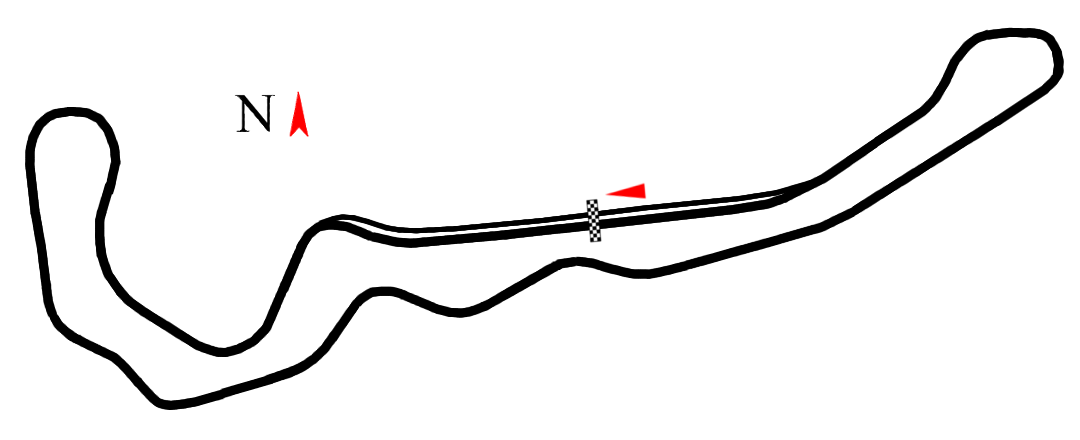
- Date: 14 June 1987
- Official name: Yu Grand Prix
- Location: Automotodrom Rijeka
- Course: Permanent racing facility; 4.168 km (2.590 mi)

500cc
Pole position
- Rider: (Australia) Wayne Gardner
- Time: 1:30.700
Fastest lap
- Rider: (Australia) Wayne Gardner
- Time: 1:32.000
Podium
- First: (Australia) Wayne Gardner
- Second: (United States) Randy Mamola
- Third: (United States) Eddie Lawson

250cc
Pole position
- Rider: (Venezuela) Carlos Lavado
- Time: 1:33.150
Fastest lap
- Rider: (Venezuela) Carlos Lavado
- Time: 1:34.090
Podium
- First: (Venezuela) Carlos Lavado
- Second: (Italy) Loris Reggiani
- Third: (West Germany) Reinhold Roth

125cc
Pole position
- Rider: No 125cc race was held
Fastest lap
- Rider: No 125cc race was held
Podium
- First: No 125cc race was held

80cc
Pole position
- Rider: (Spain) Jorge Martínez
Fastest lap
- Rider: (West Germany) Gerhard Waibel
Podium
- First: (Spain) Jorge Martínez
- Second: (Switzerland) Stefan Dörflinger
- Third: (United Kingdom) Ian McConnachie

The 1987 Yugoslavian motorcycle Grand Prix was the sixth round of the 1987 Grand Prix motorcycle racing season. It took place on the weekend of 12–14 June 1987 at the Automotodrom Rijeka.

== Classification ==
=== 500 cc ===
| Pos. | Rider | Team | Manufacturer | Time/Retired | Points |
|---|---|---|---|---|---|
| 1 | (Australia) Wayne Gardner | Rothmans Honda Team | Honda | 46'30.640 | 15 |
| 2 | (United States) Randy Mamola | Team Lucky Strike Roberts | Yamaha | +2.430 | 12 |
| 3 | (United States) Eddie Lawson | Marlboro Yamaha Team Agostini | Yamaha | +15.220 | 10 |
| 4 | (United Kingdom) Ron Haslam | Team ROC Elf Honda | Honda | +30.320 | 8 |
| 5 | (France) Raymond Roche | Cagiva-Bastos-Alstare | Cagiva | +43.710 | 6 |
| 6 | (Italy) Pierfrancesco Chili | HB Honda Gallina Team | Honda | +44.440 | 5 |
| 7 | (Japan) Tadahiko Taira | Marlboro Yamaha Team Agostini | Yamaha | +51.670 | 4 |
| 8 | (Japan) Shunji Yatsushiro | Rothmans Honda Team | Honda | +59.500 | 3 |
| 9 | (New Zealand) Richard Scott | Honda GB | Honda | +59.760 | 2 |
| 10 | (United Kingdom) Kenny Irons | Heron Suzuki GB | Suzuki | +1'28.440 | 1 |
| 11 | (United Kingdom) Roger Burnett | Rothmans Honda Team | Honda | +1'25.090 | |
| 12 | (Italy) Fabio Biliotti | | Honda | +1'30.640 | |
| 13 | (Italy) Alessandro Valesi | | Honda | +1 lap | |
| 14 | (Switzerland) Wolfgang Von Muralt | | Suzuki | +1 lap | |
| 15 | (Switzerland) Bruno Kneubühler | | Honda | +1 lap | |
| 16 | (United Kingdom) Simon Buckmaster | | Honda | +1 lap | |
| 17 | (San Marino) Fabio Barchitta | | Honda | +1 lap | |
| 18 | (Italy) Massimo Broccoli | | Honda | +1 lap | |
| 19 | (West Germany) Andreas Leuthe | | Honda | +1 lap | |
| 20 | (France) Hervé Guilleux | | Fior | +1 lap | |
| 21 | (West Germany) Gerold Fisher | | Honda | +1 lap | |
| 22 | (West Germany) Georg Jung | | Honda | +1 lap | |
| 23 | (Switzerland) Marco Gentile | Fior | Fior | +2 laps | |
| 24 | (Greece) Dimitris Papandreou | | Suzuki | +2 laps | |
| Ret | (Socialist Federal Republic of Yugoslavia) Silvo Habat | | Honda | Retired | |
| Ret | (Czechoslovakia) Pavol Dekanek | | Suzuki | Retired | |
| Ret | (West Germany) Gustav Reiner | Team Hein Gericke | Honda | Accident | |
| Ret | (France) Louis-Luc Maisto | | Honda | Retired | |
| Ret | (United Kingdom) Rob McElnea | Marlboro Yamaha Team Agostini | Yamaha | Accident | |
| Ret | (Italy) Vittorio Scatola | Team Paton | Paton | Retired | |
| Ret | (West Germany) Helmut Schütz | | Honda | Retired | |
| DNS | (United Kingdom) Niall Mackenzie | Team HRC | Honda | Did not start | |
| DNS | (Belgium) Didier de Radiguès | Cagiva-Bastos-Alstare | Cagiva | Did not start | |
| DNS | (United States) Freddie Spencer | Team HRC | Honda | Did not start | |
| DNS | (France) Christian Sarron | Sonauto Gauloises Jack Germain | Yamaha | Did not start | |
| DNQ | (Republic of Ireland) Tony Carey | | Suzuki | Did not qualify | |

| Previous race: 1987 Austrian Grand Prix | FIM Grand Prix World Championship; 1987 season | Next race: 1987 Dutch TT |
| Previous race: 1986 Yugoslavian Grand Prix | Yugoslavian Grand Prix | Next race: 1988 Yugoslavian Grand Prix |
