= 1987 Portuguese motorcycle Grand Prix =

(Spain) 1987 Portuguese Grand Prix
Race details
- Race 13 of 15 races in the 1987 Grand Prix motorcycle racing season
- Date: 13 September 1987
- Official name: Gran Premio Marlboro de Portugal
- Location: Circuito del Jarama
- Course: Permanent racing facility; 3.404 km (2.115 mi)

500cc
Pole position
- Rider: (United States) Randy Mamola
- Time: 1:27.640
Fastest lap
- Rider: (Australia) Wayne Gardner
- Time: 1:27.990
Podium
- First: (United States) Eddie Lawson
- Second: (United States) Randy Mamola
- Third: (Australia) Kevin Magee

250cc
Pole position
- Rider: (Spain) Juan Garriga
- Time: 1:29.020
Fastest lap
- Rider: (Spain) Juan Garriga
- Time: 1:30.410
Podium
- First: (West Germany) Anton Mang
- Second: (Spain) Juan Garriga
- Third: (West Germany) Martin Wimmer

125cc
Pole position
- Rider: (Italy) Fausto Gresini
- Time: 1:33.120
Fastest lap
- Rider: (Austria) August Auinger
- Time: 1:33.250
Podium
- First: (Italy) Paolo Casoli
- Second: (Italy) Domenico Brigaglia
- Third: (Belgium) Lucio Pietroniro

80cc
Pole position
- Rider: (Spain) Jorge Martínez
- Time: 1:37.020
Fastest lap
- Rider: Unknown
Podium
- First: (Spain) Jorge Martínez
- Second: (Spain) Manuel Herreros
- Third: (West Germany) Gerhard Waibel

The 1987 Portuguese motorcycle Grand Prix was the thirteenth round of the 1987 Grand Prix motorcycle racing season. It took place on the weekend of 12–13 September 1987 at the Circuito Permanente Del Jarama.

== Classification ==
=== 500 cc ===
Pos.	Rider	Team	Manufacturer	Time/Retired	Points
1	(United States) Eddie Lawson	Marlboro Yamaha Team Agostini	Yamaha	55'20.650	15
2	(United States) Randy Mamola	Team Lucky Strike Roberts	Yamaha	+9.310	12
3	(Australia) Kevin Magee	Yamaha Roberts	Yamaha	+9.720	10
4	(Australia) Wayne Gardner	Rothmans Honda Team	Honda	+19.250	8
5	(France) Christian Sarron	Sonauto Gauloises Jack Germain	Yamaha	+41.700	6
6	(United Kingdom) Niall Mackenzie	Team HRC	Honda	+1'02.390	5
7	(Italy) Pierfrancesco Chili	HB Honda Gallina Team	Honda	+1'14.390	4
8	(Japan) Shunji Yatsushiro	Rothmans Honda Team	Honda	+1'26.940	3
9	(United Kingdom) Ron Haslam	Team ROC Elf Honda	Honda	+1 lap	2
10	(West Germany) Gustav Reiner	Team Hein Gericke	Honda	+1 lap	1
11	(Switzerland) Bruno Kneubühler		Honda	+1 lap	
12	(Switzerland) Wolfgang Von Muralt		Suzuki	+1 lap	
13	(United Kingdom) Ray Swann		Honda	+1 lap	
14	(United Kingdom) Simon Buckmaster		Honda	+1 lap	
15	(Netherlands) Hennie Boerman	Racing Team Docshop	Honda	+2 laps	
16	(United Kingdom) Ian Pratt		Suzuki	+3 laps	
17	(West Germany) Gerhard Vogt		Suzuki	+4 laps	
18	(Italy) Vincenzo Cascino		Suzuki	+5 laps	
Ret	(Belgium) Didier de Radiguès	Cagiva-Bastos-Alstare	Cagiva	Retired	
Ret	(United Kingdom) Rob McElnea	Marlboro Yamaha Team Agostini	Yamaha	Accident	
Ret	(Venezuela) Larry Moreno Vacondio		Suzuki	Retired	
Ret	(United Kingdom) Roger Burnett	Rothmans Honda Team	Honda	Retired	
Ret	(France) Raymond Roche	Cagiva-Bastos-Alstare	Cagiva	Accident	
Ret	(Italy) Alessandro Valesi		Honda	Retired	
Ret	(Switzerland) Marco Gentile	Fior	Fior	Retired	
Ret	(Switzerland) Christopher Bürki		Honda	Retired	
Ret	(San Marino) Fabio Barchitta		Honda	Retired	
Ret	(Italy) Fabio Biliotti		Honda	Retired	
Ret	(United States) Mike Baldwin	Team Lucky Strike Roberts	Yamaha	Retired	
Ret	(Japan) Tadahiko Taira	Marlboro Yamaha Team Agostini	Yamaha	Accident	
Ret	(France) Hervé Guilleux		Fior	Accident	
Ret	(Spain) Daniel Vila Amatriain		Honda	Retired	
Ret	(United Kingdom) Tony Carey		Suzuki	Retired	
DNS	(Netherlands) Maarten Duyzers		Honda	Did not start	

Previous race: 1987 San Marino Grand Prix	FIM Grand Prix World Championship; 1987 season	Next race: 1987 Brazilian Grand Prix
Previous race: None	Portuguese Grand Prix	Next race: 2000 Portuguese Grand Prix
