= 1987 British motorcycle Grand Prix =

(United Kingdom) 1987 British Grand Prix
Race details
- Race 9 of 15 races in the 1987 Grand Prix motorcycle racing season
- Date: 2 August 1987
- Official name: Shell Oils British Motorcycle Grand Prix
- Location: Donington Park
- Course: Permanent racing facility; 4.020 km (2.498 mi)

500cc
Pole position
- Rider: (Australia) Wayne Gardner
- Time: 1:38.290
Fastest lap
- Rider: (Japan) Tadahiko Taira
Podium
- First: (United States) Eddie Lawson
- Second: (Australia) Wayne Gardner
- Third: (United States) Randy Mamola

250cc
Pole position
- Rider: (France) Patrick Igoa
Fastest lap
- Rider: (West Germany) Martin Wimmer
Podium
- First: (West Germany) Anton Mang
- Second: (Italy) Loris Reggiani
- Third: (West Germany) Martin Wimmer

125cc
Pole position
- Rider: (Italy) Bruno Casanova
Fastest lap
- Rider: (Italy) Fausto Gresini
Podium
- First: (Italy) Fausto Gresini
- Second: (Italy) Pier Paolo Bianchi
- Third: (France) Jean-Claude Selini

80cc
Pole position
- Rider: (Spain) Jorge Martínez
Fastest lap
- Rider: (Spain) Jorge Martínez
Podium
- First: (Spain) Jorge Martínez
- Second: (United Kingdom) Ian McConnachie
- Third: (West Germany) Gerhard Waibel

The 1987 British motorcycle Grand Prix was the ninth round of the 1987 Grand Prix motorcycle racing season. It took place on the weekend of 1–2 August 1987 at Donington Park.

== Classification ==
=== 500 cc ===
Pos.	Rider	Team	Manufacturer	Time/Retired	Points
1	(United States) Eddie Lawson	Marlboro Yamaha Team Agostini	Yamaha	50'09.770	15
2	(Australia) Wayne Gardner	Rothmans Honda Team	Honda	+4.610	12
3	(United States) Randy Mamola	Team Lucky Strike Roberts	Yamaha	+14.920	10
4	(France) Christian Sarron	Sonauto Gauloises Jack Germain	Yamaha	+21.440	8
5	(United Kingdom) Niall Mackenzie	Team HRC	Honda	+24.640	6
6	(Belgium) Didier de Radiguès	Cagiva-Bastos-Alstare	Cagiva	+31.540	5
7	(United Kingdom) Ron Haslam	Team ROC Elf Honda	Honda	+31.930	4
8	(Japan) Tadahiko Taira	Marlboro Yamaha Team Agostini	Yamaha	+32.970	3
9	(United Kingdom) Roger Burnett	Rothmans Honda Team	Honda	+35.960	2
10	(United Kingdom) Kenny Irons	Heron Suzuki GB	Suzuki	+52.140	1
11	(Japan) Shunji Yatsushiro	Rothmans Honda Team	Honda	+1'07.580	
12	(Italy) Pierfrancesco Chili	HB Honda Gallina Team	Honda	+1'15.960	
13	(New Zealand) Richard Scott	Team Lucky Strike Roberts	Yamaha	+1'21.440	
14	(Switzerland) Marco Gentile	Fior	Fior	+1'23.430	
15	(Italy) Fabio Biliotti		Honda	+1'24.120	
16	(Switzerland) Wolfgang Von Muralt		Suzuki	+1 lap	
17	(Switzerland) Bruno Kneubühler		Honda	+1 lap	
18	(France) Hervé Guilleux		Fior	+1 lap	
19	(Italy) Alessandro Valesi		Honda	+1 lap	
20	(United Kingdom) Joey Dunlop		Honda	+1 lap	
21	(France) Louis-Luc Maisto		Honda	+1 lap	
22	(Republic of Ireland) Alan Irwin		Honda	+1 lap	
23	(Netherlands) Maarten Duyzers		Honda	+1 lap	
24	(San Marino) Fabio Barchitta		Honda	+1 lap	
25	(Socialist Federal Republic of Yugoslavia) Silvo Habat		Honda	+2 laps	
26	(Netherlands) Hennie Boerman	Racing Team Docshop	Honda	+2 laps	
Ret	(United Kingdom) Rob McElnea	Marlboro Yamaha Team Agostini	Yamaha	Retired	
Ret	(United Kingdom) Simon Buckmaster		Honda	Retired	
Ret	(United Kingdom) Roger Marshall		Suzuki	Retired	
Ret	(West Germany) Gustav Reiner	Team Hein Gericke	Honda	Accident	
Ret	(United Kingdom) Andy McGladdery		Honda	Retired	
Ret	(United Kingdom) Mark Phillips		Suzuki	Retired	
Ret	(United Kingdom) Steve Henshaw		Honda	Retired	
Ret	(West Germany) Manfred Fischer	Team Hein Gericke	Honda	Retired	
Ret	(United Kingdom) Ray Swann		Honda	Retired	
Ret	(United States) Freddie Spencer	Team HRC	Honda	Retired	
DNQ	(United Kingdom) Alan Jeffery		Suzuki	Did not qualify	
DNQ	(Luxembourg) Andreas Leuthe		Honda	Did not qualify	
DNQ	(United Kingdom) Ian Pratt		Suzuki	Did not qualify	
DNQ	(New Zealand) Dennis Ireland		Suzuki	Did not qualify	
DNQ	(Venezuela) Larry Moreno Vacondio		Suzuki	Did not qualify	
DNQ	(Austria) Josef Doppler		Honda	Did not qualify	
DNQ	(United Kingdom) Steve Manley		Suzuki	Did not qualify	
DNQ	(Denmark) Claus Wulff		Suzuki	Did not qualify	

Previous race: 1987 French Grand Prix	FIM Grand Prix World Championship; 1987 season	Next race: 1987 Swedish motorcycle Grand Prix
Previous race: 1986 British Grand Prix	British Grand Prix	Next race: 1988 British Grand Prix
