= 1987 French motorcycle Grand Prix =

Motorcycle racing competition

(France) 1987 French Grand Prix
Race details
- Race 8 of 15 races in the 1987 Grand Prix motorcycle racing season
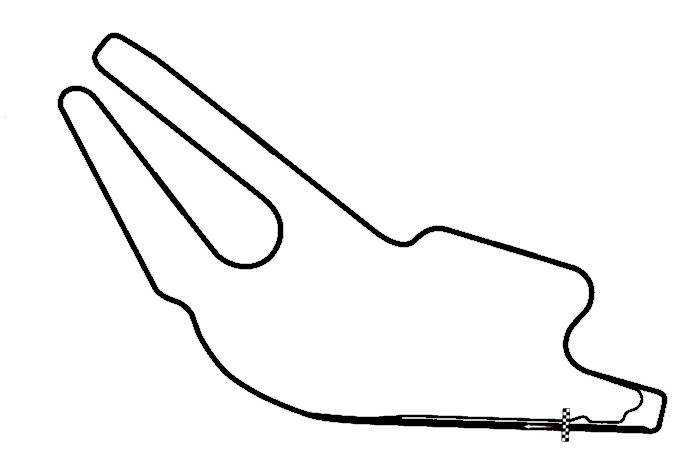
- Date: 19 July 1987
- Official name: Grand Prix de France
- Location: Bugatti Circuit
- Course: Permanent racing facility; 4.240 km (2.635 mi)

500cc
Pole position
Rider	(France) Christian Sarron	Yamaha
Time	1:42.380	
Fastest lap
Rider	(United States) Randy Mamola	Yamaha
Time	1:59.290	
Podium
First	(United States) Randy Mamola	
Second	(Italy) Pierfrancesco Chili	
Third	(France) Christian Sarron	

250cc
Pole position
- Rider: (France) Dominique Sarron
Fastest lap
- Rider: Unknown
Podium
- First: (West Germany) Reinhold Roth
- Second: (France) Dominique Sarron
- Third: (Spain) Carlos Cardús

125cc
Pole position
- Rider: (Italy) Fausto Gresini
Fastest lap
- Rider: Unknown
Podium
- First: (Italy) Fausto Gresini
- Second: (Italy) Ezio Gianola
- Third: (Italy) Bruno Casanova

The 1987 French motorcycle Grand Prix was the eighth round of the 1987 Grand Prix motorcycle racing season. It took place on the weekend of 18–19 July 1987 at the Bugatti Circuit located in Le Mans.

== Classification ==
=== 500 cc ===
Pos.	Rider	Team	Manufacturer	Time/Retired	Points
1	(United States) Randy Mamola	Team Lucky Strike Roberts	Yamaha	58'43.500	15
2	(Italy) Pierfrancesco Chili	HB Honda Gallina Team	Honda	+34.180	12
3	(France) Christian Sarron	Sonauto Gauloises Jack Germain	Yamaha	+40.640	10
4	(Australia) Wayne Gardner	Rothmans Honda Team	Honda	+44.190	8
5	(United Kingdom) Ron Haslam	Team ROC Elf Honda	Honda	+50.250	6
6	(United Kingdom) Kenny Irons	Heron Suzuki GB	Suzuki	+1'06.020	5
7	(United Kingdom) Niall Mackenzie	Team HRC	Honda	+1'33.530	4
8	(Japan) Shunji Yatsushiro	Rothmans Honda Team	Honda	+1'38.850	3
9	(United States) Kevin Schwantz	Heron Suzuki GB	Suzuki	+1'39.390	2
10	(United Kingdom) Roger Burnett	Rothmans Honda Team	Honda	+1'57.870	1
11	(Switzerland) Marco Gentile	Fior	Fior	+1 lap	
12	(West Germany) Manfred Fischer	Team Hein Gericke	Honda	+1 lap	
13	(United Kingdom) Simon Buckmaster		Honda	+1 lap	
14	(Socialist Federal Republic of Yugoslavia) Silvo Habat		Honda	+1 lap	
15	(Netherlands) Maarten Duyzers		Honda	+2 laps	
16	(Italy) Vittorio Scatola	Team Paton	Paton	+2 laps	
17	(Spain) Daniel Vila Amatriain		Honda	+2 laps	
18	(France) Daniel Pauget		Suzuki	+2 laps	
19	(France) Rachel Nicotte		Suzuki	+2 laps	
20	(United Kingdom) Ian Pratt		Suzuki	+2 laps	
21	(United Kingdom) Alan Jeffery		Suzuki	+3 laps	
22	(France) Louis-Luc Maisto		Honda	+3 laps	
Ret	(San Marino) Fabio Barchitta		Honda	Retired	
Ret	(Netherlands) Kees van der Endt		Honda	Accident	
Ret	(France) Hervé Guilleux		Fior	Retired	
Ret	(Switzerland) Bruno Kneubühler		Honda	Retired	
Ret	(United States) Eddie Lawson	Marlboro Yamaha Team Agostini	Yamaha	Accident	
Ret	(Luxembourg) Andreas Leuthe		Honda	Retired	
Ret	(United Kingdom) Rob McElnea	Marlboro Yamaha Team Agostini	Yamaha	Accident	
Ret	(Switzerland) Wolfgang Von Muralt		Suzuki	Accident	
Ret	(Belgium) Didier de Radiguès	Cagiva-Bastos-Alstare	Cagiva	Retired	
Ret	(West Germany) Gustav Reiner	Team Hein Gericke	Honda	Retired	
Ret	(Finland) Ari Rämö		Honda	Retired	
Ret	(France) Raymond Roche	Cagiva-Bastos-Alstare	Cagiva	Retired	
Ret	(New Zealand) Richard Scott	Team Lucky Strike Roberts	Yamaha	Retired	
Ret	(Italy) Alessandro Valesi		Honda	Retired	
DNS	(United Kingdom) Ray Swann		Honda	Did not start	
DNS	(West Germany) Rolf Aljes		Suzuki	Did not start	
DNS	(Japan) Tadahiko Taira	Marlboro Yamaha Team Agostini	Yamaha	Did not start	
DNQ	(Greece) Stelio Marmaras		Suzuki	Did not qualify	

Previous race: 1987 Dutch TT	FIM Grand Prix World Championship; 1987 season	Next race: 1987 British Grand Prix
Previous race: 1986 French Grand Prix	French motorcycle Grand Prix	Next race: 1988 French Grand Prix
