= 1987 San Marino motorcycle Grand Prix =

1987 Motorcycle race

1987 San Marino Grand Prix
Race details
- Race 12 of 15 races in the 1987 Grand Prix motorcycle racing season
- Date: 30 August 1987
- Official name: Grand Prix San Marino
- Location: Circuito Internazionale Santa Monica
- Course: Permanent racing facility; 3.488 km (2.167 mi)

500cc
Pole position
- Rider: (United States) Eddie Lawson
- Time: 1:18.990
Fastest lap
- Rider: (United States) Randy Mamola
- Time: 1:18.980
Podium
- First: (United States) Randy Mamola
- Second: (United States) Eddie Lawson
- Third: (Australia) Wayne Gardner

250cc
Pole position
- Rider: (Italy) Luca Cadalora
- Time: 1:21.780
Fastest lap
- Rider: (Italy) Luca Cadalora
- Time: 1:21.820
Podium
- First: (Italy) Loris Reggiani
- Second: (Italy) Luca Cadalora
- Third: (Spain) Sito Pons

125cc
Pole position
- Rider: (Italy) Fausto Gresini
- Time: 1:25.040
Fastest lap
- Rider: (Italy) Fausto Gresini
- Time: 1:24.880
Podium
- First: (Italy) Fausto Gresini
- Second: (Austria) August Auinger
- Third: (Italy) Paolo Casoli

80cc
Pole position
- Rider: (Spain) Jorge Martínez
Fastest lap
- Rider: (Spain) Manuel Herreros
Podium
- First: (Spain) Manuel Herreros
- Second: (Switzerland) Stefan Dörflinger
- Third: (United Kingdom) Ian McConnachie

The 1987 San Marino motorcycle Grand Prix was the twelfth race of the 1987 Grand Prix motorcycle racing season. It took place on 30 August 1987 at the Circuito Internazionale Santa Monica.

== Classification ==
=== 500 cc ===
Pos.	Rider	Team	Manufacturer	Time/Retired	Points
1	(United States) Randy Mamola	Team Lucky Strike Roberts	Yamaha	46'35.850	15
2	(United States) Eddie Lawson	Marlboro Yamaha Team Agostini	Yamaha	+3.960	12
3	(Australia) Wayne Gardner	Rothmans Honda Team	Honda	+34.830	10
4	(Japan) Tadahiko Taira	Marlboro Yamaha Team Agostini	Yamaha	+41.710	8
5	(Japan) Shunji Yatsushiro	Rothmans Honda Team	Honda	+1'01.750	6
6	(United Kingdom) Roger Burnett	Rothmans Honda Team	Honda	+1'02.190	5
7	(United Kingdom) Niall Mackenzie	Team HRC	Honda	+1'02.370	4
8	(France) Christian Sarron	Sonauto Gauloises Jack Germain	Yamaha	+1'02.690	3
9	(West Germany) Gustav Reiner	Team Hein Gericke	Honda	+1 lap	2
10	(Switzerland) Marco Gentile	Fior	Fior	+1 lap	1
11	(Spain) Daniel Vila Amatriain		Honda	+1 lap	
12	(Italy) Alessandro Valesi		Honda	+1 lap	
13	(San Marino) Fabio Barchitta		Honda	+1 lap	
14	(United Kingdom) Ray Swann		Honda	+1 lap	
15	(Switzerland) Bruno Kneubühler		Honda	+1 lap	
16	(West Germany) Manfred Fischer	Team Hein Gericke	Honda	+2 laps	
17	(Italy) Marco Papa		Honda	+2 laps	
18	(United Kingdom) Simon Buckmaster		Honda	+2 laps	
19	(Italy) Romolo Balbi		Honda	+2 laps	
20	(Austria) Karl Truchsess		Honda	+2 laps	
21	(Italy) Marco Marchesani		Suzuki	+3 laps	
Ret	(Italy) Vittorio Scatola	Team Paton	Paton	Retired	
Ret	(New Zealand) Richard Scott	Team Lucky Strike Roberts	Yamaha	Accident	
Ret	(Italy) Vittorio Gibertini		Suzuki	Retired	
Ret	(Italy) Fabio Biliotti		Honda	Retired	
Ret	(Belgium) Didier de Radiguès	Cagiva-Bastos-Alstare	Cagiva	Retired	
Ret	(Italy) Leandro Beccheroni		Honda	Retired	
Ret	(United Kingdom) Kenny Irons	Heron Suzuki GB	Suzuki	Retired	
Ret	(Switzerland) Wolfgang Von Muralt		Suzuki	Retired	
Ret	(Italy) Massimo Broccoli		Honda	Retired	
Ret	(United Kingdom) Rob McElnea	Marlboro Yamaha Team Agostini	Yamaha	Accident	
Ret	(United Kingdom) Ron Haslam	Team ROC Elf Honda	Honda	Retired	
Ret	(Socialist Federal Republic of Yugoslavia) Silvo Habat		Honda	Retired	
Ret	(United States) Freddie Spencer	Team HRC	Honda	Accident	
Ret	(Italy) Pierfrancesco Chili	HB Honda Gallina Team	Honda	Accident	
DNQ	(Finland) Ari Rämö		Honda	Did not qualify	
DNQ	(Austria) Josef Doppler		Honda	Did not qualify	
DNQ	(Denmark) Claus Wulff		Suzuki	Did not qualify	
DNQ	(West Germany) Gerold Fischer		Honda	Did not qualify	
DNQ	(Luxembourg) Andreas Leuthe		Honda	Did not qualify	
DNQ	(Venezuela) Larry Moreno Vacondio		Suzuki	Did not qualify	
DNQ	(Chile) Vincenzo Cascino		Suzuki	Did not qualify	
DNQ	(France) Thierry Rapicault		Fior	Did not qualify	
DNQ	(West Germany) Georg-Robert Jung		Honda	Did not qualify	

Previous race: 1987 Czechoslovak Grand Prix	FIM Grand Prix World Championship; 1987 season	Next race: 1987 Portuguese Grand Prix
Previous race: 1986 San Marino Grand Prix	San Marino Grand Prix	Next race: 1991 San Marino Grand Prix
