= 1988 Nations motorcycle Grand Prix =

(Italy) 1988 Nations Grand Prix
Race details
- Race 5 of 15 races in the 1988 Grand Prix motorcycle racing season
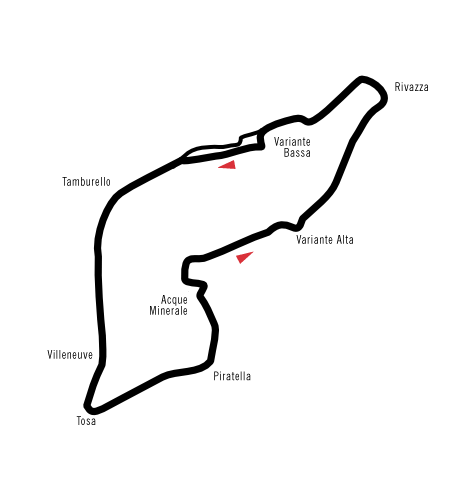
- Date: 22 May 1988
- Official name: Gran Premio d'Italia
- Location: Autodromo Dino Ferrari
- Course: Permanent racing facility; 5.040 km (3.132 mi)

500cc
Pole position
| Rider | (Australia) Wayne Gardner | Honda |
| Time | 1:55.030 | |
Fastest lap
| Rider | (United States) Eddie Lawson | Yamaha |
| Time | 1:54.410 | |
Podium
| First | (United States) Eddie Lawson | Yamaha |
| Second | (Australia) Wayne Gardner | Honda |
| Third | (United States) Wayne Rainey | Yamaha |

250cc
Pole position
| Rider | (France) Dominique Sarron | Honda |
| Time | 1:59.990 | |
Fastest lap
| Rider | (France) Dominique Sarron | Honda |
Podium
| First | (France) Dominique Sarron | Honda |
| Second | (Spain) Sito Pons | Honda |
| Third | (Spain) Juan Garriga | Yamaha |

125cc
Pole position
| Rider | (Spain) Jorge Martínez | Derbi |
| Time | 2:08.140 | |
Fastest lap
| Rider | (Spain) Jorge Martínez | Derbi |
Podium
| First | (Spain) Jorge Martínez | Derbi |
| Second | (Spain) Manuel Herreros | Derbi |
| Third | (Italy) Ezio Gianola | Honda |

80cc
Pole position
| Rider | (Spain) Jorge Martínez | Derbi |
| Time | 2:12.000 | |
Fastest lap
| Rider | (Spain) Jorge Martínez | Derbi |
Podium
| First | (Spain) Jorge Martínez | Derbi |
| Second | (Switzerland) Stefan Dörflinger | Krauser |
| Third | (Spain) Manuel Herreros | Derbi |

The 1988 Nations motorcycle Grand Prix was the fifth race of the 1988 Grand Prix motorcycle racing season. It took place on the weekend of 20–22 May 1988, at the Autodromo Dino Ferrari.

== 500 cc race report ==
Wayne Gardner on pole. Through the first turn, it was Eddie Lawson, Kevin Schwantz, Didier De Radiguès, Pierfrancesco Chili and Gardner.

At the end of the first lap, it was Lawson, De Radiguès, Schwantz, Gardner, Chili and Wayne Rainey.

Another few laps and it was Lawson, Gardner, De Radiguès, then a small gap to Rainey and Schwantz.

Lawson got a gap from a re-formed quartet behind. Christian Sarron went down at a chicane, forcing Kevin Magee and Niall Mackenzie off the track.

On the cool down lap there was a collision between Tadahiko Taira and Raymond Roche.

== 500 cc classification ==
| Pos. | Rider | Team | Manufacturer | Time/Retired | Points |
|---|---|---|---|---|---|
| 1 | (United States) Eddie Lawson | Marlboro Yamaha Team Agostini | Yamaha | 48:17.160 | 20 |
| 2 | (Australia) Wayne Gardner | Rothmans Honda Team | Honda | +15.510 | 17 |
| 3 | (United States) Wayne Rainey | Team Lucky Strike Roberts | Yamaha | +26.740 | 15 |
| 4 | (United States) Kevin Schwantz | Suzuki Pepsi Cola | Suzuki | +32.860 | 13 |
| 5 | (Australia) Kevin Magee | Team Lucky Strike Roberts | Yamaha | +48.490 | 11 |
| 6 | (Italy) Pierfrancesco Chili | HB Honda Gallina Team | Honda | +53.120 | 10 |
| 7 | (United States) Randy Mamola | Cagiva Corse | Cagiva | +1:15.110 | 9 |
| 8 | (Japan) Shunji Yatsushiro | Rothmans Honda Team | Honda | +1:16.770 | 8 |
| 9 | (France) Raymond Roche | Cagiva Corse | Cagiva | +1:17.210 | 7 |
| 10 | (Japan) Tadahiko Taira | Tech 21 | Yamaha | +1:18.010 | 6 |
| 11 | (United Kingdom) Niall Mackenzie | Team HRC | Honda | +1 Lap | 5 |
| 12 | (United Kingdom) Rob McElnea | Suzuki Pepsi Cola | Suzuki | +1 Lap | 4 |
| 13 | (Italy) Alessandro Valesi | Team Iberia | Honda | +1 Lap | 3 |
| 14 | (Switzerland) Marco Gentile | Fior Marlboro | Fior | +1 Lap | 2 |
| 15 | (France) Patrick Igoa | Sonauto Gauloises Blondes Yamaha Mobil 1 | Yamaha | +1 Lap | 1 |
| 16 | (United Kingdom) Ron Haslam | Team ROC Elf Honda | Elf Honda | +1 Lap | |
| 17 | (Italy) Alberto Rota | | Honda | +1 Lap | |
| 18 | (San Marino) Fabio Barchitta | Racing Team Katayama | Honda | +1 Lap | |
| 19 | (Switzerland) Bruno Kneubühler | Romer Racing Suisse | Honda | +1 Lap | |
| 20 | (Italy) Romolo Balbi | | Honda | +1 Lap | |
| 21 | (Finland) Ari Ramo | | Honda | +1 Lap | |
| 22 | (Sweden) Peter Sköld | Team Honda Sweden | Honda | +1 Lap | |
| 23 | (France) Rachel Nicotte | PVI Racing | Honda | +1 Lap | |
| 24 | (Italy) Marco Papa | Team Greco | Honda | +1 Lap | |
| 25 | (Netherlands) Maarten Duyzers | HDJ International | Honda | +1 Lap | |
| 26 | (Switzerland) Nicholas Schmassman | FMS | Honda | +1 Lap | |
| Ret | (United Kingdom) Steve Manley | Gateford Motors | Suzuki | Retirement | |
| Ret | (Germany) Manfred Fischer | Team Hein Gericke | Honda | Retirement | |
| Ret | (Spain) Daniel Amatriain | Ducados Lotus Guarz | Honda | Retirement | |
| Ret | (France) Christian Sarron | Sonauto Gauloises Blondes Yamaha Mobil 1 | Yamaha | Retirement | |
| Ret | (Italy) Massimo Broccoli | Cagiva Corse | Cagiva | Retirement | |
| Ret | (United Kingdom) Roger Burnett | Racing Team Katayama | Honda | Retirement | |
| Ret | (Belgium) Didier de Radiguès | Marlboro Yamaha Team Agostini | Yamaha | Retirement | |
| Ret | (France) Jean Luc Demierre | | Suzuki | Retirement | |
| Ret | (Italy) Vittorio Scatola | Road Racing Team Avia | Paton | Retirement | |
| Ret | (Italy) Fabio Biliotti | Team Amoranto | Honda | Retirement | |
| DNQ | (Luxembourg) Andreas Leuthe | | Suzuki | Did not qualify | |
| DNQ | (Venezuela) Larry Moreno Vacondio | | Suzuki | Did not qualify | |
| DNQ | (Italy) Leandro Becheroni | | Honda | Did not qualify | |

| Previous race: 1988 Expo 92 Grand Prix | FIM Grand Prix World Championship; 1988 season | Next race: 1988 German Grand Prix |
| Previous race: 1987 Nations Grand Prix | Nations Grand Prix | Next race: 1989 Nations Grand Prix |
