= 1987 Austrian motorcycle Grand Prix =

(Austria) 1987 Austrian Grand Prix
Race details
- Race 5 of 15 races in the 1987 Grand Prix motorcycle racing season
- Date: 7 June 1987
- Official name: Großer Preis von Österreich
- Location: Salzburgring
- Course: Permanent racing facility; 4.246 km (2.638 mi)

500cc
Pole position
- Rider: (Australia) Wayne Gardner
- Time: 1:21.460
Fastest lap
- Rider: Unknown
Podium
- First: (Australia) Wayne Gardner
- Second: (United States) Randy Mamola
- Third: (United Kingdom) Niall Mackenzie

250cc
Pole position
- Rider: Unknown
Fastest lap
- Rider: Unknown
Podium
- First: (West Germany) Anton Mang
- Second: (Italy) Loris Reggiani
- Third: (West Germany) Reinhold Roth

125cc
Pole position
- Rider: Unknown
Fastest lap
- Rider: Unknown
Podium
- First: (Italy) Fausto Gresini
- Second: (Italy) Bruno Casanova
- Third: (Italy) Paolo Casoli

80cc
Pole position
- Rider: Unknown
Fastest lap
- Rider: Unknown
Podium
- First: (Spain) Jorge Martínez
- Second: (West Germany) Gerhard Waibel
- Third: (Spain) Manuel Herreros

The 1987 Austrian motorcycle Grand Prix was the fifth round of the 1987 Grand Prix motorcycle racing season. It took place on the weekend of 4–7 June 1987 at the Salzburgring.

== Classification ==
=== 500 cc ===
Pos.	Rider	Team	Manufacturer	Time/Retired	Points
1	(Australia) Wayne Gardner	Rothmans Honda Team	Honda	39'57.890	15
2	(United States) Randy Mamola	Team Lucky Strike Roberts	Yamaha	+2.370	12
3	(United Kingdom) Niall Mackenzie	Team HRC	Honda	+13.210	10
4	(United Kingdom) Ron Haslam	Team ROC Elf Honda	Honda	+19.370	8
5	(United Kingdom) Rob McElnea	Marlboro Yamaha Team Agostini	Yamaha	+24.370	6
6	(France) Christian Sarron	Sonauto Gauloises Jack Germain	Yamaha	+34.210	5
7	(Japan) Shunji Yatsushiro	Rothmans Honda Team	Honda	+44.180	4
8	(United Kingdom) Roger Burnett	Rothmans Honda Team	Honda	+56.630	3
9	(Japan) Tadahiko Taira	Marlboro Yamaha Team Agostini	Yamaha	+56.970	2
10	(Italy) Pierfrancesco Chili	HB Honda Gallina Team	Honda	+57.200	1
11	(New Zealand) Richard Scott	Honda GB	Honda	+1'11.930	
12	(Belgium) Didier de Radiguès	Cagiva-Bastos-Alstare	Cagiva	+1'18.460s	
13	(Italy) Fabio Biliotti		Honda	+1 lap	
14	(Switzerland) Wolfgang Von Muralt		Suzuki	+1 lap	
15	(Italy) Alessandro Valesi		Honda	+1 lap	
16	(Austria) Karl Truchsess		Honda	+1 lap	
17	(United Kingdom) Simon Buckmaster		Honda	+1 lap	
18	(West Germany) Manfred Fischer	Team Hein Gericke	Honda	+1 lap	
19	(West Germany) Gerold Fisher		Honda	+1 lap	
20	(France) Hervé Guilleux		Fior	+1 lap	
21	(Socialist Federal Republic of Yugoslavia) Silvo Habat		Honda	+2 laps	
22	(Netherlands) Maarten Duyzers		Honda	+2 laps	
23	(West Germany) Georg Jung		Honda	+2 laps	
24	(United Kingdom) Steve Manley		Suzuki	+2 laps	
25	(Austria) Rudolf Zeller		Honda	+2 laps	
Ret	(United States) Eddie Lawson	Marlboro Yamaha Team Agostini	Yamaha	Retired	
Ret	(Switzerland) Christopher Bürki		Honda	Retired	
Ret	(Austria) Josef Doppler		Honda	Retired	
Ret	(Switzerland) Marco Gentile	Fior	Fior	Retired	
Ret	(United Kingdom) Kenny Irons		Heron Suzuki GB	Retired	
Ret	(Austria) Franz Kaserer		Suzuki	Retired	
Ret	(Switzerland) Bruno Kneubühler		Honda	Retired	
Ret	(West Germany) Gustav Reiner	Team Hein Gericke	Honda	Accident	
Ret	(France) Raymond Roche	Cagiva-Bastos-Alstare	Cagiva	Retired	
Ret	(West Germany) Andreas Leuthe		Honda	Retired	
Ret	(West Germany) Michael Rudroff		Honda	Retired	
Ret	(West Germany) Helmut Schütz		Honda	Retired	
DNQ	(Austria) Dietmar Marehardt		Honda	Did not qualify	
DNQ	(San Marino) Fabio Barchitta		Honda	Did not qualify	

Previous race: 1987 Nations Grand Prix	FIM Grand Prix World Championship; 1987 season	Next race: 1987 Yugoslavian Grand Prix
Previous race: 1986 Austrian Grand Prix	Austrian Grand Prix	Next race: 1988 Austrian Grand Prix
