= 1987 German motorcycle Grand Prix =

(West Germany) 1987 German Grand Prix
Race details
- Race 3 of 15 races in the 1987 Grand Prix motorcycle racing season
- Date: 17 May 1987
- Official name: Grosser Preis von Deutschland
- Location: Hockenheimring
- Course: Permanent racing facility; 6.789 km (4.218 mi)

500cc
Pole position
- Rider: (Australia) Wayne Gardner
- Time: 2:04.770
Fastest lap
- Rider: (Australia) Wayne Gardner
- Time: 2:05.500
Podium
- First: (United States) Eddie Lawson
- Second: (United States) Randy Mamola
- Third: (United Kingdom) Ron Haslam

250cc
Pole position
- Rider: (West Germany) Reinhold Roth
- Time: 2:13.330
Fastest lap
- Rider: (Venezuela) Carlos Lavado
Podium
- First: (West Germany) Anton Mang
- Second: (Switzerland) Jacques Cornu
- Third: (West Germany) Reinhold Roth

125cc
Pole position
- Rider: (Italy) Fausto Gresini
- Time: 2:24.750
Fastest lap
- Rider: (Italy) Fausto Gresini
Podium
- First: (Italy) Fausto Gresini
- Second: (Austria) August Auinger
- Third: (Italy) Bruno Casanova

80cc
Pole position
- Rider: (West Germany) Gerhard Waibel
Fastest lap
- Rider: (Spain) Jorge Martínez
Podium
- First: (West Germany) Gerhard Waibel
- Second: (Spain) Jorge Martínez
- Third: (West Germany) Stefan Dörflinger

The 1987 German motorcycle Grand Prix was the third round of the 1987 Grand Prix motorcycle racing season. It took place on the weekend of 15–17 May 1987 at the Hockenheimring.

== 500 cc classification ==
Pos.	Rider	Team	Manufacturer	Time/Retired	Points
1	(United States) Eddie Lawson	Marlboro Yamaha Team Agostini	Yamaha	40'21.640	15
2	(United States) Randy Mamola	Team Lucky Strike Roberts	Yamaha	+13.350	12
3	(United Kingdom) Ron Haslam	Team ROC Elf Honda	Honda	+13.900	10
4	(Japan) Tadahiko Taira	Marlboro Yamaha Team Agostini	Yamaha	+20.590	8
5	(United Kingdom) Rob McElnea	Marlboro Yamaha Team Agostini	Yamaha	+29.140	6
6	(Italy) Pierfrancesco Chili	HB Honda Gallina Team	Honda	+45.790	5
7	(United Kingdom) Niall Mackenzie	Team HRC	Honda	+46.090	4
8	(United Kingdom) Roger Burnett	Rothmans Honda Team	Honda	+54.760	3
9	(West Germany) Gustav Reiner	Team Hein Gericke	Honda	+55.220	2
10	(Australia) Wayne Gardner	Rothmans Honda Team	Honda	+1'15.720	1
11	(Switzerland) Bruno Kneubühler		Honda	+1'22.280	
12	(Belgium) Didier de Radiguès	Cagiva-Bastos-Alstare	Cagiva	+1'23.260	
13	(New Zealand) Richard Scott	Honda GB	Honda	+1'35.970	
14	(Italy) Fabio Biliotti		Honda	+1'36.360	
15	(United Kingdom) Donnie McLeod		Suzuki	+1'44.880	
16	(San Marino) Fabio Barchitta		Honda	+1 lap	
17	(Finland) Ari Rämö		Honda	+1 lap	
18	(Italy) Marco Papa		Honda	+1 lap	
19	(Spain) Daniel Vila Amatriain		Honda	+1 lap	
20	(United Kingdom) Simon Buckmaster		Honda	+1 lap	
21	(West Germany) Gerold Fischer		Honda	+1 lap	
22	(Netherlands) Maarten Duyzers		Honda	+1 lap	
23	(United Kingdom) Steve Manley		Suzuki	+1 lap	
24	(West Germany) Georg Jung		Honda	+1 lap	
25	(West Germany) Helmut Schutz		Honda	+1 lap	
Ret	(West Germany) Manfred Fischer	Team Hein Gericke	Honda	Retirement	
Ret	(Switzerland) Marco Gentile	Fior	Fior	Retirement	
Ret	(Socialist Federal Republic of Yugoslavia) Silvo Habat		Honda	Retirement	
Ret	(United Kingdom) Kenny Irons	Heron Suzuki GB	Suzuki	Retirement	
Ret	(Finland) Esko Kuparinen		Honda	Retirement	
Ret	(France) Thierry Rapicault		Honda	Retirement	
Ret	(France) Raymond Roche	Cagiva-Bastos-Alstare	Cagiva	Retirement	
Ret	(West Germany) Michael Rudroff		Honda	Retirement	
Ret	(France) Christian Sarron	Sonauto Gauloises Jack Germain	Yamaha	Retirement	
Ret	(Japan) Shunji Yatsushiro	Rothmans Honda Team	Honda	Accident	
DNS	(United States) Mike Baldwin	Team Lucky Strike Roberts	Yamaha	Injury	
DNS	(Italy) Alessandro Valesi		Honda	Injury	
DNS	(United States) Freddie Spencer	Team HRC	Honda	Injury	
DNS	(Austria) Karl Truchsess		Honda	Injury	
DNQ	(Austria) Josef Doppler		Honda	Did not qualify	
DNQ	(West Germany) Peter Schleef		Yamaha	Did not qualify	
DNQ	(France) Louis-Luc Maisto		Honda	Did not qualify	
DNQ	(Switzerland) Wolfgang Von Muralt		Suzuki	Did not qualify	
DNQ	(West Germany) Rolf Aljes		Suzuki	Did not qualify	
DNQ	(West Germany) Hans Klingebiel		Suzuki	Did not qualify	
DNQ	(Switzerland) Christopher Bürki		Honda	Did not qualify	
DNQ	(West Germany) Gerhard Vogt		Suzuki	Did not qualify	
DNQ	(Netherlands) Hennie Boerman	Racing Team Docshop	Honda	Did not qualify	
DNQ	(Czechoslovakia) Pavol Dekánek		Suzuki	Did not qualify	
DNQ	(Republic of Ireland) Tony Carey		Suzuki	Did not qualify	
DNQ	(West Germany) Andreas Leuthe		Honda	Did not qualify	
DNQ	(Venezuela) Larry Moreno Vacondio		Suzuki	Did not qualify	
DNQ	(Czechoslovakia) Bohumil Staša		Honda	Did not qualify	

Previous race: 1987 Spanish Grand Prix	FIM Grand Prix World Championship; 1987 season	Next race: 1987 Nations Grand Prix
Previous race: 1986 German Grand Prix	German Grand Prix	Next race: 1988 German Grand Prix
