= 1987 Nations motorcycle Grand Prix =

International sporting competition

(Italy) 1987 Nations Grand Prix
Race details
- Race 4 of 15 races in the 1987 Grand Prix motorcycle racing season
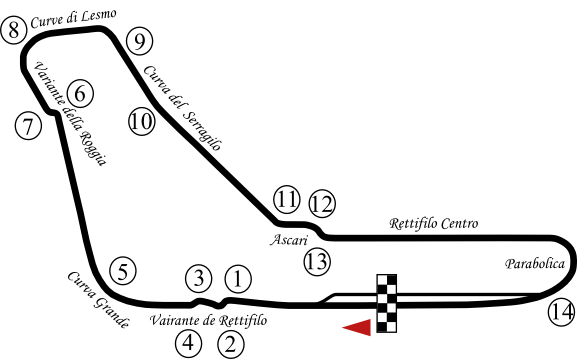
- Date: 24 May 1987
- Official name: Gran Premio delle Nazioni
- Location: Autodromo Nazionale Monza
- Course: Permanent racing facility; 5.800 km (3.604 mi)

500cc
Pole position
- Rider: (Australia) Wayne Gardner
- Time: 1:48.660
Fastest lap
- Rider: (Australia) Wayne Gardner
- Time: 1:49.000
Podium
- First: (Australia) Wayne Gardner
- Second: (United States) Eddie Lawson
- Third: (France) Christian Sarron

250cc
Pole position
- Rider: (Italy) Loris Reggiani
- Time: 1:55.690
Fastest lap
- Rider: (France) Dominique Sarron
- Time: 1:55.750
Podium
- First: (West Germany) Anton Mang
- Second: (West Germany) Reinhold Roth
- Third: (France) Dominique Sarron

125cc
Pole position
- Rider: (Italy) Bruno Casanova
- Time: 2:03.820
Fastest lap
- Rider: (Italy) Bruno Casanova
- Time: 2:03.150
Podium
- First: (Italy) Fausto Gresini
- Second: (Italy) Bruno Casanova
- Third: (Austria) August Auinger

80cc
Pole position
- Rider: (Spain) Jorge Martínez
Fastest lap
- Rider: (Spain) Jorge Martínez
Podium
- First: (Spain) Jorge Martínez
- Second: (Spain) Manuel Herreros
- Third: (Switzerland) Stefan Dörflinger

The 1987 Nations motorcycle Grand Prix was the fourth race of the 1987 Grand Prix motorcycle racing season. It took place on the weekend of 22–24 May 1987, at the Autodromo Nazionale Monza.

== Classification ==
=== 500 cc ===
Pos.	Rider	Team	Manufacturer	Time/Retired	Points
1	(Australia) Wayne Gardner	Rothmans Honda Team	Honda	44'48.100	15
2	(United States) Eddie Lawson	Marlboro Yamaha Team Agostini	Yamaha	+15.660	12
3	(France) Christian Sarron	Sonauto Gauloises Jack Germain	Yamaha	+32.460	10
4	(United Kingdom) Rob McElnea	Marlboro Yamaha Team Agostini	Yamaha	+32.490	8
5	(United Kingdom) Ron Haslam	Team ROC Elf Honda	Honda	+32.550	6
6	(Japan) Tadahiko Taira	Marlboro Yamaha Team Agostini	Yamaha	+40.480	5
7	(Italy) Pierfrancesco Chili	HB Honda Gallina Team	Honda	+1'01.890	4
8	(United States) Kevin Schwantz	Heron Suzuki GB	Suzuki	+1'02.190	3
9	(France) Raymond Roche	Cagiva-Bastos-Alstare	Cagiva	+1'06.000	2
10	(United Kingdom) Niall Mackenzie	Team HRC	Honda	+1'06.260	1
11	(United Kingdom) Roger Burnett	Rothmans Honda Team	Honda	+1'33.060	
12	(West Germany) Manfred Fischer	Team Hein Gericke	Honda	+1 lap	
13	(New Zealand) Richard Scott	Honda GB	Honda	+1 lap	
14	(Switzerland) Bruno Kneubühler		Honda	+1 lap	
15	(Italy) Massimo Broccoli		Honda	+1 lap	
16	(Italy) Marco Papa		Honda	+1 lap	
17	(San Marino) Fabio Barchitta		Honda	+1 lap	
18	(Switzerland) Bruno Kneubühler		Honda	+1 lap	
19	(Italy) Alessandro Valesi		Honda	+1 lap	
20	(Italy) Fabio Biliotti		Honda	+2 laps	
21	(Italy) Vittorio Scatola	Team Paton	Paton	+2 laps	
22	(Finland) Esko Kuparinen		Honda	+2 laps	
Ret	(Spain) Daniel Amatriain		Honda	Retired	
Ret	(West Germany) Gerold Fisher		Honda	Retired	
Ret	(Switzerland) Marco Gentile		Fior	Retired	
Ret	(United States) Randy Mamola	Team Lucky Strike Roberts	Yamaha	Accident	
Ret	(Italy) Marco Marchesani		Suzuki	Retired	
Ret	(Switzerland) Wolfgang Von Muralt		Suzuki	Retired	
Ret	(Belgium) Didier de Radiguès	Cagiva-Bastos-Alstare	Cagiva	Retired	
Ret	(France) Thierry Rapicault		Honda	Retired	
Ret	(West Germany) Gustav Reiner	Team Hein Gericke	Honda	Accident	
Ret	(Japan) Shunji Yatsushiro	Rothmans Honda Team	Honda	Retired	
Ret	(United Kingdom) Kenny Irons	Heron Suzuki GB	Suzuki	Retired	
DNS	(United States) Kenny Roberts	Team Lucky Strike Roberts	Yamaha	Did not start	
DNS	(United Kingdom) Simon Buckmaster		Honda	Did not start	
DNS	(Netherlands) Maarten Duyzers		Honda	Fell during warm-up lap	
DNQ	(Luxembourg) Andreas Leuthe		Honda	Did not qualify	
DNQ	(Italy) Leandro Beccheroni		Suzuki	Did not qualify	
DNQ	(Austria) Josef Doppler		Honda	Did not qualify	
DNQ	(United Kingdom) Steve Manley		Suzuki	Did not qualify	
DNQ	(United Kingdom) Alan Jeffrey		Suzuki	Did not qualify	
DNQ	(Switzerland) Christopher Bürki		Honda	Did not qualify	
DNQ	(Republic of Ireland) Tony Carey		Suzuki	Did not qualify	
DNQ	(Venezuela) Larry Moreno Vacondio		Suzuki	Did not qualify	

Previous race: 1987 German Grand Prix	FIM Grand Prix World Championship; 1987 season	Next race: 1987 Austrian Grand Prix
Previous race: 1986 Nations Grand Prix	Nations Grand Prix	Next race: 1988 Nations Grand Prix
