= 1987 Dutch TT =

(Netherlands) 1987 Dutch TT
Race details
- Race 7 of 15 races in the 1987 Grand Prix motorcycle racing season
- Date: 27 June 1987
- Official name: Dutch TT
- Location: TT Circuit Assen
- Course: Permanent racing facility; 6.049 km (3.759 mi)

500cc
Pole position
- Rider: (Australia) Wayne Gardner
- Time: 2:12.330
Fastest lap
- Rider: Unknown
Podium
- First: (Australia) Eddie Lawson
- Second: (United States) Wayne Gardner
- Third: (United States) Randy Mamola

250cc
Pole position
- Rider: Unknown
Fastest lap
- Rider: Unknown
Podium
- First: (West Germany) Anton Mang
- Second: (West Germany) Reinhold Roth
- Third: (Spain) Sito Pons

125cc
Pole position
- Rider: Unknown
Fastest lap
- Rider: Unknown
Podium
- First: (Italy) Fausto Gresini
- Second: (Italy) Bruno Casanova
- Third: (Italy) Paolo Casoli

80cc
Pole position
- Rider: Unknown
Fastest lap
- Rider: Unknown
Podium
- First: (Spain) Jorge Martínez
- Second: (Spain) Manuel Herreros
- Third: (Switzerland) Stefan Dörflinger

The 1987 Dutch TT was the seventh round of the 1987 Grand Prix motorcycle racing season. It took place on the weekend of 22–27 June 1987 at the TT Circuit Assen located in Assen, Netherlands.

== Classification ==
=== 500 cc ===
Pos.	Rider	Team	Manufacturer	Time/Retired	Points
1	(United States) Eddie Lawson	Marlboro Yamaha Team Agostini	Yamaha	50'12.910	15
2	(Australia) Wayne Gardner	Rothmans Honda Team	Honda	+6.670	12
3	(United States) Randy Mamola	Team Lucky Strike Roberts	Yamaha	+12.990	10
4	(United Kingdom) Rob McElnea	Marlboro Yamaha Team Agostini	Yamaha	+16.430	8
5	(United Kingdom) Ron Haslam	Team ROC Elf Honda	Honda	+38.310	6
6	(Belgium) Didier de Radiguès	Cagiva-Bastos-Alstare	Cagiva	+43.340	5
7	(United Kingdom) Roger Burnett	Rothmans Honda Team	Honda	+45.230	4
8	(United Kingdom) Kenny Irons	Heron Suzuki GB	Suzuki	+1'03.090	3
9	(Italy) Pierfrancesco Chili	HB Honda Gallina Team	Honda	+1'41.420	2
10	(Australia) Kevin Magee	Yamaha Roberts	Yamaha	+2'00.110	1
11	(United Kingdom) Ray Swann		Honda	+2'23.260	
12	(United Kingdom) Simon Buckmaster		Honda	+2'55.020	
13	(Switzerland) Marco Gentile	Fior	Fior	+3'30.610	
14	(Japan) Shunji Yatsushiro	Rothmans Honda Team	Honda	+3'19.370	
15	(Italy) Fabio Biliotti		Honda	+3'21.880	
16	(West Germany) Gerold Fisher		Honda	+3'24.210	
17	(United Kingdom) Steve Manley		Suzuki	+4'15.840	
18	(Japan) Tadahiko Taira	Marlboro Yamaha Team Agostini	Yamaha	+1 lap	
19	(Socialist Federal Republic of Yugoslavia) Silvo Habat		Honda	+1 lap	
20	(France) Hervé Guilleux		Fior	+2 laps	
21	(Switzerland) Bruno Kneubühler		Honda	+2 laps	
22	(Spain) Daniel Vila Amatriain		Honda	+2 laps	
Ret	(West Germany) Manfred Fischer	Team Hein Gericke	Honda	Retired	
Ret	(United Kingdom) Alan Jeffery		Suzuki	Retired	
Ret	(United Kingdom) Niall Mackenzie	Team HRC	Honda	Retired	
Ret	(Netherlands) Henk van der Mark		Honda	Retired	
Ret	(Switzerland) Wolfgang Von Muralt		Suzuki	Retired	
Ret	(United Kingdom) Mark Phillips		Suzuki	Retired	
Ret	(Netherlands) Rob Punt	Racing Team Docshop	Suzuki	Retired	
Ret	(France) Christian Sarron	Sonauto Gauloises Jack Germain	Yamaha	Retired	
Ret	(New Zealand) Richard Scott	Honda GB	Honda	Retired	
Ret	(Austria) Karl Truchsess		Honda	Retired	
Ret	(Italy) Alessandro Valesi		Honda	Retired	
Ret	(France) Raymond Roche	Cagiva-Bastos-Alstare	Cagiva	Accident	
Ret	(Netherlands) Koos van Leijen		Honda	Accident	
DNS	(Italy) Marco Papa		Honda	Injured	
DNS	(Italy) Fabio Biliotti		Honda	Injured	
DNQ	(Venezuela) Larry Moreno Vacondio		Suzuki	Did not qualify	
DNQ	(Netherlands) Maarten Duyzers		Honda	Did not qualify	
DNQ	(West Germany) Andreas Leuthe		Honda	Did not qualify	
DNQ	(Netherlands) Henny Boerman	Racing Team Docshop	Honda	Did not qualify	
DNQ	(Austria) Josef Doppler		Honda	Did not qualify	

Previous race: 1987 Yugoslavian Grand Prix	FIM Grand Prix World Championship; 1987 season	Next race: 1987 French Grand Prix
Previous race: 1986 Dutch TT	Dutch TT	Next race: 1988 Dutch TT
