= Shunji Yatsushiro =

Japanese motorcycle racer

- Nationality: Japanese
- Born: August 26, 1960 (age 66)
Motorcycle racing career statistics
Grand Prix motorcycle racing
Active years	1986 - 1989
First race	1986 500cc Austrian Grand Prix
Last race	1989 500cc Japanese Grand Prix
Team	Honda
Starts / Wins / Podiums / Poles / F. laps / Points; 34 / 0 / 0 / 0 / 0 / 107

Shunji Yatsushiro (八代 俊二, Yatsushiro Shunji; born August 26, 1960) is a former Grand Prix motorcycle road racer from Japan. He began his Grand Prix career in 1986. He enjoyed his best season in 1987, when he finished the season in ninth place in the 500cc world championship. His best GP qualifying position was fourth place, which he achieved several times that season.

Yatsushiro won the following titles in domestic competition: 1981 Novice 250cc Japanese Champion (Yamaha), 1983 Formula One Japanese Champion (Kawasaki), 1984 Formula One Japanese Champion (Honda).

== Grand Prix career statistics ==
Points system from 1969 to 1987:

**Position**	1	2	3	4	5	6	7	8	9	10
**Points**	15	12	10	8	6	5	4	3	2	1

Points system from 1988 to 1992:

**Position**	1	2	3	4	5	6	7	8	9	10	11	12	13	14	15
**Points**	20	17	15	13	11	10	9	8	7	6	5	4	3	2	1

(key) (Races in bold indicate pole position; races in italics indicate fastest lap)

Year	Class	Team	Machine	1	2	3	4	5	6	7	8	9	10	11	12	13	14	15	Points	Rank	Wins
1986	500cc	HRC-Moriwaki Honda	NSR500	ESP -	NAT -	GER -	AUT; 7	YUG; 8	NED; NC	BEL -	FRA; NC	GBR; NC	SWE; 14	RSM; 11					7	13th	0
1987	500cc	Rothmans-Honda	NSR500	JPN; NC	ESP; 8	GER; NC	NAT; NC	AUT; 7	YUG; 8	NED; 14	FRA; 8	GBR; 11	SWE; NC	CZE; 6	RSM; 5	POR; 8	BRA; 6	ARG; 4	40	9th	0
1988	500cc	Rothmans-Honda	NSR500	JPN; 10	USA; NC	ESP; 9	EXP; NC	NAT; 8	GER; 10	AUT; 7	NED; 11	BEL; 9	YUG; 7	FRA; NC	GBR -	SWE -	CZE -	BRA -	57	13th	0
1989	500cc	HRC-Honda	NSR500	JPN; 13	AUS -	USA -	ESP -	NAT -	GER -	AUT -	YUG -	NED -	BEL -	FRA -	GBR -	SWE -	CZE -	BRA -	3	41st	0
