= 1988 Yugoslavian motorcycle Grand Prix =

(Socialist Federal Republic of Yugoslavia) 1988 Yugoslavian Grand Prix
Race details
- Race 10 of 15 races in the 1988 Grand Prix motorcycle racing season
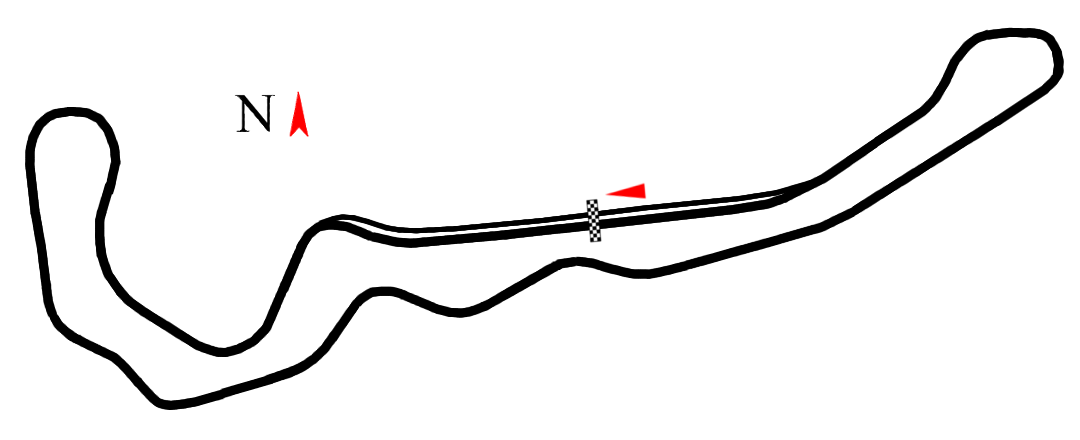
- Date: 17 July 1988
- Official name: Yu Grand Prix
- Location: Automotodrom Rijeka
- Course: Permanent racing facility; 4.168 km (2.590 mi)

500cc
Pole position
Rider	(France) Christian Sarron	Yamaha
Time	1:30.176	
Fastest lap
Rider	(France) Christian Sarron	Yamaha
Time	1:30.569	
Podium
First	(Australia) Wayne Gardner	Honda
Second	(France) Christian Sarron	Yamaha
Third	(United States) Wayne Rainey	Yamaha

250cc
Pole position
Rider	(Spain) Sito Pons	Honda
Time	1:32.040	
Fastest lap
Rider	(Spain) Juan Garriga	Yamaha
Time	1:32.184	
Podium
First	(Spain) Sito Pons	Honda
Second	(Spain) Juan Garriga	Yamaha
Third	(France) Dominique Sarron	Honda

125cc
Pole position
Rider	(Spain) Jorge Martínez	Derbi
Time	1:38.820	
Fastest lap
Rider	(Italy) Corrado Catalano	Aprilia
Time	1:39.220	
Podium
First	(Spain) Jorge Martínez	Derbi
Second	(Italy) Ezio Gianola	Honda
Third	(Belgium) Lucio Pietroniro	Honda

80cc
Pole position
Rider	(Spain) Jorge Martínez	Derbi
Fastest lap
Rider	(Spain) Jorge Martínez	Derbi
Podium
First	(Spain) Jorge Martínez	Derbi
Second	(Germany) Peter Öttl	Krauser
Third	(Spain) Àlex Crivillé	Derbi

The 1988 Yugoslavian motorcycle Grand Prix was the tenth round of the 1988 Grand Prix motorcycle racing season. It took place on the weekend of 15–17 July 1988 at the Rijeka circuit.

== 500 cc race report ==
Eddie Lawson dislocates his shoulder in practice, but starts the race against doctor's orders. He's 34 points ahead of Wayne Gardner.

Christian Sarron gets his 4th pole in a row, but Wayne Rainey gets the start from Gardner, Kevin Magee, et al.

Gardner through to 1st, then it's Rainey, Sarron, Magee and Niall Mackenzie.

Gardner and Sarron get a gap to Rainey and Magee, with Randy Mamola in a close 5th.

Gardner's 3rd win in a row, and he's now 20 points from Lawson.

== 500 cc classification ==
Pos.	Rider	Team	Manufacturer	Time/Retired	Points
1	(Australia) Wayne Gardner	Rothmans Honda Team	Honda	+45'44.146	20
2	(France) Christian Sarron	Sonauto Gauloises Blondes Yamaha Mobil 1	Yamaha	+7.740	17
3	(United States) Wayne Rainey	Team Lucky Strike Roberts	Yamaha	+21.340	15
4	(United States) Randy Mamola	Cagiva Corse	Cagiva	+23.620	13
5	(Australia) Kevin Magee	Team Lucky Strike Roberts	Yamaha	+23.850	11
6	(Belgium) Didier de Radiguès	Marlboro Yamaha Team Agostini	Yamaha	+58.290	10
7	(Japan) Shunji Yatsushiro	Rothmans Honda Team	Honda	+1'02.260	9
8	(United Kingdom) Rob McElnea	Suzuki Pepsi Cola	Suzuki	+1'02.430	8
9	(United Kingdom) Ron Haslam	Team ROC Elf Honda	Elf Honda	+1'05.830	7
10	(United States) Eddie Lawson	Marlboro Yamaha Team Agostini	Yamaha	+1'19.750	6
11	(Italy) Pierfrancesco Chili	HB Honda Gallina Team	Honda	+1'46.300	5
12	(France) Patrick Igoa	Sonauto Gauloises Blondes Yamaha Mobil 1	Yamaha	+1 Lap	4
13	(United Kingdom) Donnie McLeod	Racing Team Katayama	Honda	+1 Lap	3
14	(United States) Mike Baldwin	Racing Team Katayama	Honda	+1 Lap	2
15	(Switzerland) Bruno Kneubühler	Romer Racing Suisse	Honda	+1 Lap	1
16	(San Marino) Fabio Barchitta	Racing Team Katayama	Honda	+1 Lap	
17	(Italy) Fabio Biliotti	Team Amoranto	Honda	+1 Lap	
18	(Austria) Karl Truchsess		Shell	+1 Lap	
19	(Spain) Daniel Amatriain	Ducados Lotus Guarz	Honda	+1 Lap	
20	(Republic of Ireland) Eddie Laycock	Millar Racing	Honda	+1 Lap	
21	(Luxembourg) Andreas Leuthe		Suzuki	+1 Lap	
22	(Socialist Federal Republic of Yugoslavia) Silvo Habat	Fego Racing Team	Honda	+2 Laps	
23	(Switzerland) Wolfgang von Muralt		Suzuki	+2 Laps	
24	(France) Jean Luc Demierre		Suzuki	+2 Laps	
25	(West Germany) Georg Robert Jung	Weigl Telefix Racing Team	Honda	+2 Laps	
26	(West Germany) Helmut Schutz	Rallye Sport	Honda	+2 Laps	
Ret	(Netherlands) Maarten Duyzers	HDJ International	Honda	Retirement	
Ret	(Switzerland) Marco Gentile	Fior Marlboro	Fior	Retirement	
Ret	(United Kingdom) Niall Mackenzie	Team HRC	Honda	Retirement	
Ret	(West Germany) Michael Rudroff		Honda	Retirement	
Ret	(Italy) Alessandro Valesi	Team Iberia	Honda	Retirement	
Ret	(Australia) Malcolm Campbell	Team ROC Elf Honda	Elf Honda	Retirement	
Ret	(France) Raymond Roche	Cagiva Corse	Cagiva	Retirement	
Ret	(Finland) Ari Ramo		Honda	Retirement	
Ret	(Italy) Marco Papa	Team Greco	Honda	Retirement	
Ret	(Czechoslovakia) Pavol Dekanek	Wernberger Konservenfabrik	Honda	Retirement	
DNQ	(Switzerland) Nicholas Schmassman	FMS	Honda	Did not qualify	
DNQ	(United Kingdom) Steve Manley	Gateford Motors	Suzuki	Did not qualify	
DNQ	(Venezuela) Larry Moreno Vacondio		Suzuki	Did not qualify	
DNQ	(Austria) Josef Doppler	MRC Grieskirchen	Honda	Did not qualify	
DNQ	(Austria) Franz Schopf	MRC Grieskirchen	Honda	Did not qualify	
DNQ	(Italy) Vincenzo Cascino		Honda	Did not qualify	
DNQ	(Austria) Michael Kaplan		Honda	Did not qualify	

Previous race: 1988 Belgian Grand Prix	FIM Grand Prix World Championship; 1988 season	Next race: 1988 French Grand Prix
Previous race: 1987 Yugoslavian Grand Prix	Yugoslavian Grand Prix	Next race: 1989 Yugoslavian Grand Prix
