= 1987 Czechoslovak motorcycle Grand Prix =

(Czechoslovakia) 1987 Czechoslovak Grand Prix
Race details
- Race 11 of 15 races in the 1987 Grand Prix motorcycle racing season
- Date: 23 August 1987
- Official name: Grand Prix ČSSR-Brno
- Location: Masaryk Circuit
- Course: Permanent racing facility; 5.403 km (3.357 mi)

500cc
Pole position
- Rider: (Australia) Wayne Gardner
- Time: 2:07.580
Fastest lap
- Rider: Unknown
Podium
- First: (Australia) Wayne Gardner
- Second: (United States) Eddie Lawson
- Third: (Japan) Tadahiko Taira

250cc
Pole position
- Rider: Unknown
Fastest lap
- Rider: Unknown
Podium
- First: (West Germany) Anton Mang
- Second: (Italy) Dominique Sarron
- Third: (Italy) Carlos Cardús

125cc
Fastest lap
- Rider: Unknown
Podium
- First: (Italy) Fausto Gresini
- Second: (Italy) Bruno Casanova
- Third: (Spain) Andres Sánchez

80cc
Pole position
- Rider: Unknown
Podium
- First: (Switzerland) Stefan Dörflinger
- Second: (Spain) Jorge Martínez
- Third: (West Germany) Gerhard Waibel

The 1987 Czechoslovak motorcycle Grand Prix was the eleventh round of the 1987 Grand Prix motorcycle racing season. It took place on the weekend of 22–23 August 1987 at the Masaryk Circuit located in Brno, Czechoslovakia.

== Classification ==
=== 500 cc ===
Pos.	Rider	Team	Manufacturer	Time/Retired	Points
1	(Australia) Wayne Gardner	Rothmans Honda Team	Honda	51'52.170	15
2	(United States) Eddie Lawson	Marlboro Yamaha Team Agostini	Yamaha	+1.870	12
3	(Japan) Tadahiko Taira	Marlboro Yamaha Team Agostini	Yamaha	+17.050	10
4	(United States) Randy Mamola	Team Lucky Strike Roberts	Yamaha	+19.060	8
5	(United Kingdom) Niall Mackenzie	Team HRC	Honda	+30.320	6
6	(Japan) Shunji Yatsushiro	Rothmans Honda Team	Honda	+40.890	5
7	(France) Christian Sarron	Sonauto Gauloises Jack Germain	Yamaha	+41.160	4
8	(United Kingdom) Rob McElnea	Marlboro Yamaha Team Agostini	Yamaha	+44.270	3
9	(Italy) Pierfrancesco Chili	HB Honda Gallina Team	Honda	+44.520	2
10	(United Kingdom) Roger Burnett	Rothmans Honda Team	Honda	+52.930	1
11	(United States) Freddie Spencer	Team HRC	Honda	+1'05.630	
12	(Belgium) Didier de Radiguès	Cagiva-Bastos-Alstare	Cagiva	+1'07.450	
13	(New Zealand) Richard Scott	Team Lucky Strike Roberts	Yamaha	+1'22.580	
14	(United Kingdom) Ron Haslam	Team ROC Elf Honda	Honda	+1'59.930	
15	(Italy) Massimo Broccoli		Honda	+2'01.610	
16	(San Marino) Fabio Barchitta		Honda	+2'02.560	
17	(United Kingdom) Simon Buckmaster		Honda	+1 lap	
18	(West Germany) Gerold Fischer		Honda	+1 lap	
19	(Austria) Rudolf Zeller		Honda	+1 lap	
20	(Austria) Josef Doppler		Honda	+1 lap	
21	(Denmark) Claus Wulff		Suzuki	+2 laps	
22	(Italy) Vincenzo Cascino		Suzuki	+2 laps	
23	(Czechoslovakia) Pavol Dekánek		Suzuki	+2 laps	
24	(Venezuela) Larry Moreno Vacondio		Suzuki	+2 laps	
25	(Austria) Dietmar Marehardt		Honda	+3 laps	
Ret	(Switzerland) Marco Gentile	Fior	Fior	Retired	
Ret	(Italy) Alessandro Valesi		Honda	Retired	
Ret	(United Kingdom) Ray Swann		Honda	Retired	
Ret	(United Kingdom) Kenny Irons	Heron Suzuki GB	Suzuki	Retired	
Ret	(Austria) Karl Truchsess		Honda	Retired	
Ret	(Switzerland) Bruno Kneubühler		Honda	Retired	
Ret	(Italy) Fabio Biliotti		Honda	Retired	
Ret	(France) Raymond Roche	Cagiva-Bastos-Alstare	Cagiva	Retired	
Ret	(Socialist Federal Republic of Yugoslavia) Silvo Habat		Honda	Retired	
Ret	(Switzerland) Wolfgang Von Muralt		Suzuki	Retired	
Ret	(Czechoslovakia) Imrich Majoroš		Suzuki	Retired	
Ret	(Netherlands) Harry Heutmekers		Suzuki	Retired	
Ret	(Czechoslovakia) Marián Troliga		Suzuki	Retired	
Ret	(Czechoslovakia) Petr Hlavatka		Honda	Retired	
Ret	(West Germany) Gerhard Vogt		Suzuki	Retired	

Previous race: 1987 Swedish Grand Prix	FIM Grand Prix World Championship; 1987 season	Next race: 1987 San Marino Grand Prix
Previous race: 1986 Czechoslovak Grand Prix	Czechoslovak Grand Prix	Next race: 1988 Czechoslovak Grand Prix
