= 1989 Yugoslavian motorcycle Grand Prix =

(Socialist Federal Republic of Yugoslavia) 1989 Yugoslavian Grand Prix
Race details
- Race 8 of 15 races in the 1989 Grand Prix motorcycle racing season
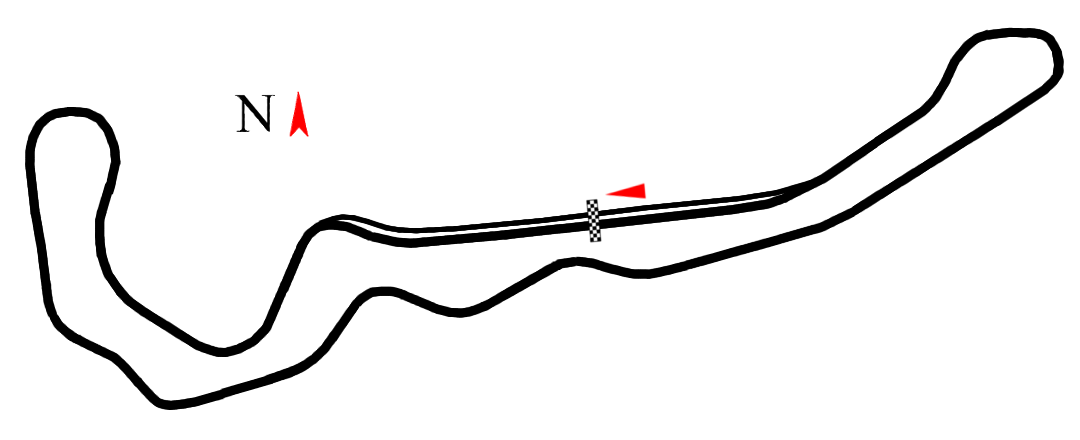
- Date: 11 June 1989
- Official name: Yu Grand Prix
- Location: Automotodrom Rijeka
- Course: Permanent racing facility; 4.168 km (2.590 mi)

500cc
Pole position
- Rider: (United States) Kevin Schwantz
- Time: 1:29.160
Fastest lap
- Rider: (United States) Wayne Rainey
- Time: 1:29.280
Podium
- First: (United States) Kevin Schwantz
- Second: (United States) Wayne Rainey
- Third: (United States) Eddie Lawson

250cc
Pole position
- Rider: (Spain) Sito Pons
- Time: 1:31.760
Fastest lap
- Rider: (Italy) Luca Cadalora
- Time: 1:32.260
Podium
- First: (Spain) Sito Pons
- Second: (West Germany) Reinhold Roth
- Third: (Switzerland) Jacques Cornu

80cc
Pole position
- Rider: (Switzerland) Stefan Dörflinger
- Time: 1:41.893
Fastest lap
- Rider: Unknown
Podium
- First: (West Germany) Peter Öttl
- Second: (Spain) Manuel Herreros
- Third: (Switzerland) Stefan Dörflinger

The 1989 Yugoslavian motorcycle Grand Prix was the eighth round of the 1989 Grand Prix motorcycle racing season. It took place on the weekend of 9–11 June 1989 at the Automotodrom Grobnik circuit, near Rijeka.

== 500 cc race report ==
Another pole for Kevin Schwantz, but Wayne Rainey gets a little gap after the light, and is chased by Eddie Lawson, Schwantz, Kevin Magee and Pierfrancesco Chili. Soon, the usual trio develops at the front. Lawson takes the lead, but makes a mistake and goes off-track, letting Schwantz and Rainey through and getting dropped from the leading group, though remaining in the third place.

Schwantz wants a win and Rainey wants as many riders between him and Lawson, so Schwantz has to earn the gap he gets from Rainey. Magee and Sarron fight for fourth.

Schwantz wins it ahead of Rainey and Lawson, and Rainey pulls ahead slightly in the standings.

== 500 cc classification ==
Pos.	Rider	Team	Manufacturer	Laps	Time/Retired	Grid	Points
1	(United States) Kevin Schwantz	Suzuki Pepsi Cola	Suzuki	30	45:10.967	1	20
2	(United States) Wayne Rainey	Team Lucky Strike Roberts	Yamaha	30	+1.193	2	17
3	(United States) Eddie Lawson	Rothmans Kanemoto Honda	Honda	30	+15.670	3	15
4	(Australia) Kevin Magee	Team Lucky Strike Roberts	Yamaha	30	+41.545	4	13
5	(France) Christian Sarron	Sonauto Gauloises Blondes Yamaha Mobil 1	Yamaha	30	+41.673	6	11
6	(Australia) Mick Doohan	Rothmans Honda Team	Honda	30	+1:05.736	10	10
7	(United States) Randy Mamola	Cagiva Corse	Cagiva	30	+1:12.921	5	9
8	(United Kingdom) Ron Haslam	Suzuki Pepsi Cola	Suzuki	30	+1:22.452	9	8
9	(Italy) Pierfrancesco Chili	HB Honda Gallina Team	Honda	30	+1:31.927	7	7
10	(France) Dominique Sarron	Team ROC Elf Honda	Honda	29	+1 Lap	11	6
11	(United Kingdom) Rob McElnea	Cabin Racing Team	Honda	29	+1 Lap	12	5
12	(United Kingdom) Niall Mackenzie	Marlboro Yamaha Team Agostini	Yamaha	29	+1 Lap	13	4
13	(Italy) Massimo Broccoli	Cagiva Corse	Cagiva	29	+1 Lap	16	3
14	(United Kingdom) Simon Buckmaster	Racing Team Katayama	Honda	29	+1 Lap	17	2
15	(West Germany) Michael Rudroff	HRK Motors	Honda	29	+1 Lap	19	1
16	(Switzerland) Bruno Kneubühler	Romer Racing Suisse	Honda	29	+1 Lap	21	
17	(Italy) Marco Papa	Team Greco	Paton	28	+2 Laps	20	
18	(West Germany) Stefan Klabacher		Honda	28	+2 Laps	25	
19	(Spain) Francisco Gonzales	Club Motocross Pozuelo	Honda	27	+3 Laps	27	
20	(Switzerland) Nicholas Schmassman	FMS	Honda	27	+3 Laps	24	
21	(Austria) Rudolf Zeller		Manhattan	27	+3 Laps	28	
Ret	(Italy) Vittorio Scatola		Honda		Retirement	18	
Ret	(Austria) Michael Kaplam		Honda		Retirement	26	
Ret	(Switzerland) Marco Gentile	Fior Marlboro	Fior		Retirement	15	
Ret	(Italy) Alessandro Valesi	Team Iberia	Yamaha		Retirement	14	
Ret	(Luxembourg) Andreas Leuthe	Librenti Corse	Suzuki		Retirement	22	
Ret	(United States) Freddie Spencer	Marlboro Yamaha Team Agostini	Yamaha		Retirement	8	
DNS	(France) Claude Albert		Suzuki		did not start	23	
DNQ	(Italy) Donato Battistoni		Honda		Did not qualify		
DNQ	(West Germany) Helmut Schutz	Rallye Sport	Honda		Did not qualify		

Previous race: 1989 Austrian Grand Prix	FIM Grand Prix World Championship; 1989 season	Next race: 1989 Dutch TT
Previous race: 1988 Yugoslavian Grand Prix	Yugoslavian Grand Prix	Next race: 1990 Yugoslavian Grand Prix
