= 1987 Grand Prix motorcycle racing season =

Sports season

The 1987 Grand Prix motorcycle racing season was the 39th F.I.M. Road Racing World Championship season.

== Season summary ==
Wayne Gardner became Australia's first-ever 500cc World Champion in a season that saw him score points in every Grand Prix. Randy Mamola would finish second yet again, one point ahead of Eddie Lawson despite Lawson's five victories. The first Japanese Grand Prix in 20 years was held at the Suzuka Circuit. Along with rounds in Brazil and Argentina, the championship was becoming a real world championship.

Venezuelan Carlos Lavado's defense of his 250 crown was spoiled by injuries sustained in a pre-season crash. Anton Mang stepped up to claim his fifth world championship ahead of four other Hondas. A new brand would announce its arrival in the 250 class when an Aprilia ridden by Loris Reggiani won the San Marino Grand Prix. Garelli's Fausto Gresini won ten out of eleven races in the 125 class, but ruined his bid for a perfect season when he crashed at the last round in Jarama. Spain's Jorge Martinez won the 80cc crown for the second consecutive year.

The Portuguese round was held in Jarama, Spain because the Portuguese Federation had transferred their rights to the Jarama organisers. 1987 would be the first year that saw clutch starts replace push starts on the grounds of safety. The FIM also announced that the 80cc class would be discontinued after 1989 and that the 125 class would be restricted to single cylinder machines.

The last round was in Argentina, which had not hosted a motorcycle Grand Prix since 1982. But appalling organization of the event saw the race nearly boycotted by the riders and their teams, and the race turned out to be a farcical embarrassment for the organizers. The safety of the Autódromo Municipal del Parque Almirante Brown de la Ciudad de Buenos Aires was totally unsuitable for racing; the organization of this Grand Prix was so bad that spectators had easy access to the circuit while the races were going on. The Argentine Grand Prix did not return until 1994.

== 1987 Grand Prix season calendar ==
The following Grands Prix were scheduled to take place in 1987:

Round	Date	Grand Prix	Circuit
1	29 March	Grand Prix of Japan	Suzuka Circuit
2	26 April	(Spain) Marlboro Gran Premio de España	Circuito Permanente de Jerez
3	17 May	(Germany) Großer Preis von Deutschland	Hockenheimring
4	24 May	(Italy) Gran Premio delle Nazioni	Autodromo Nazionale Monza
5	7 June	(Austria) Großer Preis von Österreich	Salzburgring
6	14 June	(Socialist Federal Republic of Yugoslavia) Yu Grand Prix	Automotodrom Rijeka
7	27 June	(Netherlands) Dutch TT	TT Circuit Assen
8	19 July	Grand Prix de France	Bugatti Circuit
9	2 August	(United Kingdom) Shell Oils British Motorcycle Grand Prix	Donington Park
10	9 August	(Sweden) Swedish TT	Scandinavian Raceway
11	23 August	(Czechoslovakia) Grand Prix ČSSR-Brno	Brno Circuit
12	30 August	Grand Prix San Marino	Circuito Internazionale Santa Monica
13	13 September	Gran Premio Marlboro de Portugal	Circuito Permanente Del Jarama
14	27 September	(Brazil) GP Brasil	Autódromo Internacional de Goiânia
15	4 October	Gran Prix da la República Argentina	Autódromo Oscar Alfredo Gálvez

=== Calendar changes ===
- The Japanese Grand Prix was added to the calendar after a 20-year absence. The venue hosting the race was the Suzuka Circuit instead of the previously used Fuji Speedway.
- The Spanish Grand Prix moved from the Jarama to the Jerez circuit.
- The Spanish Grand Prix was moved back, from 4 May to 29 April.
- The German Grand Prix moved from the Nürburgring to the Hockenheimring.
- The British Grand Prix moved from the Silverstone circuit to Donington Park.
- The Portuguese Grand Prix was added to the calendar. The Autódromo do Estoril was not yet suited for racing, so the Jarama circuit in Spain was chosen to host the race instead.
- The Brazilian and Argentine Grand Prix were added to the calendar. The Brazilian round was completely new, while the Argentine round returned after a 4-year absence.

== Results and standings ==
=== Grands Prix ===
Round	Date	Race	Location	80cc winner	125cc winner	250cc winner	500cc winner	Report
1	29 March	(Japan) Japanese Grand Prix	Suzuka			(Japan) Masaru Kobayashi	(United States) Randy Mamola	Report
2	26 April	(Spain) Spanish Grand Prix	Jerez	(Spain) Jorge Martínez	(Italy) Fausto Gresini	(Germany) Martin Wimmer	(Australia) Wayne Gardner	Report
3	17 May	(Germany) German Grand Prix	Hockenheim	(Germany) Gerhard Waibel	(Italy) Fausto Gresini	(Germany) Anton Mang	(United States) Eddie Lawson	Report
4	24 May	(Italy) Italian Grand Prix	Monza	(Spain) Jorge Martínez	(Italy) Fausto Gresini	(Germany) Anton Mang	(Australia) Wayne Gardner	Report
5	7 June	(Austria) Austrian Grand Prix	Salzburgring	(Spain) Jorge Martínez	(Italy) Fausto Gresini	(Germany) Anton Mang	(Australia) Wayne Gardner	Report
6	14 June	(Socialist Federal Republic of Yugoslavia) Yugoslavian Grand Prix	Automotodrom Rijeka	(Spain) Jorge Martínez		(Venezuela) Carlos Lavado	(Australia) Wayne Gardner	Report
7	27 June	(Netherlands) Dutch TT	Assen	(Spain) Jorge Martínez	(Italy) Fausto Gresini	(Germany) Anton Mang	(United States) Eddie Lawson	Report
8	19 July	(France) French Grand Prix	Le Mans		(Italy) Fausto Gresini	(Germany) Reinhold Roth	(United States) Randy Mamola	Report
9	2 August	(United Kingdom) British Grand Prix	Donington	(Spain) Jorge Martínez	(Italy) Fausto Gresini	(Germany) Anton Mang	(United States) Eddie Lawson	Report
10	9 August	(Sweden) Swedish Grand Prix	Anderstorp		(Italy) Fausto Gresini	(Germany) Anton Mang	(Australia) Wayne Gardner	Report
11	23 August	(Czechoslovakia) Czechoslovak Grand Prix	Brno	(Switzerland) Stefan Dörflinger	(Italy) Fausto Gresini	(Germany) Anton Mang	(Australia) Wayne Gardner	Report
12	30 August	San Marino Grand Prix	Misano	(Spain) Manuel Herreros	(Italy) Fausto Gresini	(Italy) Loris Reggiani	(United States) Randy Mamola	Report
13	13 September	(Portugal) Portuguese Grand Prix	Jarama	(Spain) Jorge Martínez	(Italy) Paolo Casoli	(Germany) Anton Mang	(United States) Eddie Lawson	Report
14	27 September	(Brazil) Brazilian Grand Prix	Goiania			(France) Dominique Sarron	(Australia) Wayne Gardner	Report
15	4 October	(Argentina) Argentine Grand Prix	Buenos Aires			(Spain) Sito Pons	(United States) Eddie Lawson	Report

== Participants ==
=== 500cc participants ===
Team	Constructor	Motorcycle	No.	Rider	Rounds
Marlboro Yamaha Team Agostini	Yamaha	Yamaha YZR500	1	(United States) Eddie Lawson	All
Marlboro Yamaha Team Agostini	Yamaha	Yamaha YZR500	5	(United Kingdom) Rob McElnea	1–14
Marlboro Yamaha Team Agostini	Yamaha	Yamaha YZR500	21	(Japan) Tadahiko Taira	1–7, 9–15
Rothmans Honda/HRC	Honda	Honda NSR500	2	(Australia) Wayne Gardner	All
Rothmans Honda/HRC	Honda	Honda NSR500	16	(Japan) Shunji Yatsushiro	All
Rothmans Honda Britain	Honda	Honda NSR500	12	(United Kingdom) Roger Burnett	1–13
Honda Britain	Honda	Honda RS500	57; 33	(New Zealand) Richard Scott	2–7
Team Lucky Strike Roberts	Yamaha	Yamaha YZR500	3	(United States) Randy Mamola	All
Team Lucky Strike Roberts	Yamaha	Yamaha YZR500	4	(United States) Mike Baldwin	1–2, 13–15
Team Lucky Strike Roberts	Yamaha	Yamaha YZR500	29	(Japan) Shinji Katayama	1
Team Lucky Strike Roberts	Yamaha	Yamaha YZR500	33	(Japan) Hiroyuki Kawasaki	1
Team Lucky Strike Roberts	Yamaha	Yamaha YZR500	33	(New Zealand) Richard Scott	8–12
Team Lucky Strike Roberts	Yamaha	Yamaha YZR500	51	(United States) Kenny Roberts	4
Yamaha Team Roberts	Yamaha	Yamaha YZR500	40; 17; 34	(Australia) Kevin Magee	1, 7, 13
Team Sonauto Gauloises	Yamaha	Yamaha YZR500	6	(France) Christian Sarron	1–5, 7–15
Team Cagiva - Alstare	Cagiva	Cagiva C587	7	(Belgium) Didier de Radiguès	1–5, 7–15
Team Cagiva - Alstare	Cagiva	Cagiva C587	8	(France) Raymond Roche	1–8, 11–15
Team Elf-ROC	Elf-Honda	Elf 4-Honda	9	(United Kingdom) Ron Haslam	1–13
HB Honda Gallina	Honda	Honda NS500	10	(Italy) Pierfrancesco Chili	All
HB Honda/HRC	Honda	Honda NSR500	11	(United Kingdom) Niall Mackenzie	1–5, 7–15
HRC	Honda	Honda NSR500	19	(United States) Freddie Spencer	9–12
HRC	Honda	Honda NSR500	11	(United Kingdom) Niall Mackenzie	6
HRC	Honda	Honda NSR500	27	(Japan) Keiji Kinoshita	1
Hein Gericke Racing	HG-Honda	HG500-Honda	14	(West Germany) Gustav Reiner	1–6, 8–9, 12–13
Hein Gericke Racing	HG-Honda	HG500-Honda	36; 34	(West Germany) Manfred Fischer	3–5, 7–10, 12
Servisco	Honda	Honda RS500	15	(Italy) Fabio Biliotti	2–6, 9–13
Heron Suzuki GB Ltd	Suzuki	Suzuki RGV500	18	(United Kingdom) Kenny Irons	1–12
Heron Suzuki GB Ltd	Suzuki	Suzuki RGV500	34	(United States) Kevin Schwantz	2, 4, 8
Heron Suzuki GB Ltd	Suzuki	Suzuki RGV500	34	(United Kingdom) Donnie McLeod	3
Heron Suzuki GB Ltd	Suzuki	Suzuki RGV500	32	(Japan) Takumi Ito	1
Skoal Bandit Heron Suzuki	Suzuki	Suzuki RG500 TSR6 (XR70)	46	(United Kingdom) Roger Marshall	9
Duckhams NLM - North London Motorcycles	Honda	Honda RS500	22	(United Kingdom) Simon Buckmaster	1–3, 5–13
Team Iberna	Honda	Honda RS500	23	(Italy) Alessandro Valesi	1–2, 4–13
Frankonia-Suzuki	Suzuki	Suzuki RG500 TSR6 (XR70)	24	(Switzerland) Wolfgang von Muralt	1–2, 4–14
Lucky Strike Fior	Fior-Honda	Fior-Honda RS500	25	(Switzerland) Marco Gentile	All
Fior-SNCF	Fior-Honda	Fior-Honda RS500	53; 26	(France) Thierry Rapicault	2–4
Fior-SNCF	Fior-Honda	Fior-Honda RS500	55; 72	(France) Hervé Guilleux	5–11, 13
Andy Leuthe World Championship Racing	Honda	Honda RS500	40	(Luxembourg) Andreas Leuthe	4–6, 8
La Vigile San Marco	Honda	Honda RS500	42; 78; 29; 50	(Italy) Fabio Barchitta	3–4, 6–13
Bruno Kneubühler	Honda	Honda RS500	37; 45; 65; 55	(Switzerland) Bruno Kneubühler	2–13
H.D.J. B.Y	Honda	Honda RS500	61; 44	(Netherlands) Maarten Duyzers	2–3, 5, 8–10
FE-GO	Honda	Honda RS500	56	(Socialist Federal Republic of Yugoslavia) Silvo Habat	6
Rallye Sport	Honda	Honda RS500	27	(West Germany) Gerold Fischer	2–7, 10–11
Walter Wolf-Suzuki Japan	Suzuki	Suzuki RGV500	31	(Japan) Masaru Mizutani	1
MS Kajigaya	Yamaha	Yamaha YZR500	35	(Japan) Norihiko Fujiwara	1
TSR Honda Kanto	Honda	Honda NS500	36	(Japan) Kyoji Nanba	1
SRS Sugaya	Suzuki	Suzuki RG500 (XR70)	38	(Japan) Susumu Shimada	1
Team Sweden	Honda	Honda RS500	32	(Sweden) Peter Linden	10
Daniel Amatriain Grand Prix Racing	Honda	Honda RS500	37	(Spain) Daniel Amatriain	2–4, 8, 12–13
Team Greco	Suzuki	Suzuki RG500 (XR45)	38	(Italy) Vittorio Gibertini	12
Assmex Docshop	Suzuki	Suzuki RGB500	39	(Netherlands) Rob Punt	7
Assmex Docshop	Honda	Honda RS500	40	(Netherlands) Henny Boerman	7, 9, 13
Aldridge Racing	Honda	Honda RS500	31; 42	(United Kingdom) Ray Swann	7–10, 13
Plein Pot	Honda	Honda RS500	45	(France) Louis-Luc Maisto	2, 6, 8–10
Moto Paton Srl.	Paton	Paton V115	40	(Italy) Vittorio Scatola	4–6, 8, 12
Hestmann Motor	Suzuki	Suzuki RGB500	40	(Norway) Geir Hestmann	10
Shell Gemini	Honda	Honda RS500	52	(United Kingdom) Joey Dunlop	9
Blue Wing-Bratt Honda	Honda	Honda NS500	59	(United Kingdom) Andy McGladdery	9
Motoclub Merate	Suzuki	Suzuki RGB500	68	(Italy) Marco Marchesani	4
Shell-DAF Trucks	Honda	Honda RS500	52	(Austria) Karl Truchsess	3, 5, 7
Vincenzo Cascino	Suzuki	Suzuki RGB500	39	(Chile) Vincenzo Cascino	13–15

Key
Regular Rider
Wildcard Rider
Replacement Rider

=== 250cc participants ===
Team	Constructor	Motorcycle	No.	Rider	Rounds
HB-Venemotos	Yamaha	Yamaha YZR 250	1	(Venezuela) Carlos Lavado	2–10, 13–15
Campsa-Honda	Honda	Honda NSR250	2	(Spain) Sito Pons	All
Rothmans Honda France	Honda	Honda NSR250	3	(France) Dominique Sarron	1–6, 8–15
Rothmans Honda	Honda	Honda NSR250	4	(West Germany) Anton Mang	All
Pole Position/Ville d’Hyeres	Honda	Honda RS250R	5	(France) Jean-François Baldé	1, 3–6, 8–14
Defi	Defi-Rotax	??	5	(France) Jean-François Baldé	1, 3–6, 8–14
Marlboro Yamaha Team Agostini	Yamaha	Yamaha YZR 250	6	(West Germany) Martin Wimmer	1–2, 5–15
Marlboro Yamaha Team Agostini	Yamaha	Yamaha YZR 250	22	(Italy) Luca Cadalora	1–5, 7–15
Marlboro Yamaha Team Agostini	Yamaha	Yamaha YZR 250	??	(Italy) Massimo Messere	??
Team Parisienne-Elf	Honda	Honda NSR250	7	(Switzerland) Jacques Cornu	1–10
Team Parisienne-Elf	Honda	Honda NSR250	23	(Switzerland) Urs Lüzi	10–15
Team Parisienne-Elf	Honda	Honda RS250R	55	(Switzerland) Bernard Hänggeli	2, 9, 11, 13
Team Iberna	Honda	Honda RS250R	8	(Italy) Fausto Ricci	1–2, 12–13
??	Honda	Honda RS250R	10	(United Kingdom) Donnie Mcleod	1–13
Pepsi/Ehrlich Automotive	EMC-Rotax	??	10	(United Kingdom) Donnie Mcleod	1–13
Team Ducados Angel Nieto	Honda	Honda NSR250	12	(Spain) Carlos Cardús	1, 3–15
Racing Team Katayama	Sekitoba-Honda	Honda RS250R	14	(Belgium) Stéphane Mertens	All
Racing Team Katayama	Sekitoba-Honda	Honda RS250R	15	(Italy) Virginio Ferrari	1
Team Italia Garelli	Garelli	Garelli 250 GP	16	(Italy) Maurizio Vitali	1–6, 9–13
Sonauto Gauloises	Yamaha	Yamaha YZR 250	17	(France) Patrick Igoa	1–5, 7–15
Sonauto Gauloises	Yamaha	Yamaha YZR 250	21	(France) Jean-Philippe Ruggia	All
Sonauto Yamaha	Yamaha	Yamaha TZ 250	21	(France) Jean-Philippe Ruggia	All
??	Chevallier-Yamaha	Yamaha TZ 250	19	(France) Jean Foray	2–3, 6–8, 10, 12–15
Atomic Road Racing Team	Honda	Honda RS250R	20	(Austria) Hans Lindner	3–11
HB Römer Team	Honda	Honda NSR250	24	(West Germany) Reinhold Roth	All
Römer Racing Team	Honda	Honda RS250R	34; 32	(West Germany) Harald Eckl	1–13
Honda France	Honda	Honda RS250R	25	(France) Jean-Michel Mattioli	All
??	Honda	Honda RS250R	27	(West Germany) Manfred Herweh	1–2, 4–13
Ducados-Yamaha Racing	Yamaha	Yamaha YZR 250	31	(Spain) Joan Garriga	1–7, 11–15
Team Aprilia	Aprilia AFI-Rotax	??	32; 18; 30; 41; 36; 34	(Italy) Loris Reggiani	2–6, 8–15
Pave d’Affinois	Honda	Honda RS250R	36	(France) Guy Bertin	All
D Gallacher - Bradgate Containers	Yamaha Honda	Yamaha TZ 250; Honda RS250R	38	(United Kingdom) Kevin Mitchell	1, 6–7, 9–11
East West Transport	Honda	Honda RS250R	41	(Republic of Ireland) Garry Cowan	3, 5–9, 11–12
Ajinomoto	Honda	Honda NSR250	43; 45	(Japan) Masahiro Shimizu	1, 14–15
Ajinomoto	Honda	Honda NSR250	44	(Japan) Masaru Kobayashi	1
HOMA Racing Team	Honda	Honda RS250R	43	(Austria) Siegfried Minich	2, 5–7
Mitsui-Yamaha	Yamaha	Yamaha TZ 250	45	(West Germany) Jochen Schmid	2–10, 12
M.T.D	Honda	Honda RS250R	48	(France) Bruno Bonhuil	1–4, 6, 8, 10–15
F.M.V.	Yamaha	Yamaha TZ 250	49; 33	(Venezuela) Iván Palazzese	6, 11–12
Gazzaniga Corse	Gazzaniga-Rotax	??	??	(Italy) Stefano Caracchi	2, 4, 7–10, 12–15
Angelo Gazzaniga	Honda	Honda RS250R	49	(Italy) Stefano Caracchi	2, 4, 7–10, 12–15
??	Yamaha	Yamaha TZ 250	55	(Belgium) René Délaby	2–13
??	Honda	Honda RS250R	??	(France) Alain Bronec	2, 6, 8–11, 13–15
Moriwaki	Honda	Honda NSR250	??	(United Kingdom) Alan Carter	1
??	Honda	Honda RS250R	??	(France) Hervé Duffard	2, 8–10, 14–15
??	Honda	Honda RS250R	??	(Switzerland) Urs Lüzi	10–15
??	Honda	Honda RS250R	??	(Italy) Alberto Rota	2–3, 12–13

Key
Regular Rider
Wildcard Rider
Replacement Rider

== Final standings ==
=== 500cc standings ===
Scoring system

Points are awarded to the top ten finishers. A rider has to finish the race to earn points.

Position	1st	2nd	3rd	4th	5th	6th	7th	8th	9th	10th
Points	15	12	10	8	6	5	4	3	2	1

Pos.	Rider	Team	Machine	JPN (Japan)	ESP (Spain)	GER (West Germany)	NAT (Italy)	AUT (Austria)	YUG (Socialist Federal Republic of Yugoslavia)	NED (Netherlands)	FRA (France)	GBR (United Kingdom)	SWE (Sweden)	TCH (Czechoslovakia)	SMR (San Marino)	POR (Portugal)	BRA (Brazil)	ARG (Argentina)	Pts
1	(Australia) Wayne Gardner	Rothmans Honda-HRC	NSR500	2	1^{F}	10^{P F}	1^{P F}	1^{P F}	1^{P F}	2^{P}	4	2^{P}	1^{P F}	1^{P F}	3	4^{F}	1^{P F}	3^{P}	178
2	(United States) Randy Mamola	Team Lucky Strike-Roberts	YZR500	1^{F}	6	2	Ret	2	2	3	1^{F}	3	3	4	1^{F}	2^{P}	3	2	158
3	(United States) Eddie Lawson	Marlboro-Agostini	YZR500	Ret	2^{P}	1	2	Ret	3	1^{F}	Ret	1	2	2	2^{P}	1	2	1	157
4	(United Kingdom) Ron Haslam	Team Elf-ROC	NSR500	5	3	3	5	4	4	5	5	7	6	14	Ret	9	11	10	72
5	(United Kingdom) Niall Mackenzie	HB-Honda	NSR500	Ret^{P}	4	7	10	3	DNS	Ret	7	5	5	5	7	6	8	7	61
6	(Japan) Tadahiko Taira	Marlboro-Agostini	YZR500	6	7	4	6	9	7	18		8^{F}	13	3	4	Ret	7	8	56
7	(France) Christian Sarron	Sonauto Gauloises-Yamaha	YZR500	Ret	Ret	Ret	3	6	DNS	Ret	3^{P}	4	Ret	7	8	5	5	Ret	52
8	(Italy) Pierfrancesco Chili	HB-Honda	NSR500	4	11	6	7	10	6	9	2	12	Ret	9	Ret	7	9	9	47
9	(Japan) Shunji Yatsushiro	Rothmans Honda-HRC	NSR500	Ret	8	Ret	Ret	7	8	14	8	11	Ret	6	5	8	6	4	40
10	(United Kingdom) Robert McElnea	Marlboro-Agostini	YZR500	Ret	Ret	5	4	5	Ret	4	Ret	Ret	4	8	Ret	Ret	Ret	DNS	39
11	(United Kingdom) Roger Burnett	Rothmans Honda Britain	NSR500	8	9	8	11	8	11	7	10	9	10	10	6	Ret			25
12	(Belgium) Didier de Radigues	Team Cagiva-Alstare	GP500	Ret	Ret	12	Ret	12	DNS	6	Ret	6	8	12	Ret	Ret	4	Ret	21
13	(France) Raymond Roche	Team Cagiva-Alstare	GP500	10	Ret	Ret	9	Ret	5	Ret	Ret			Ret	Ret	Ret	Ret	5	15
14	(United Kingdom) Kenny Irons	Heron-Suzuki	RGV500	Ret	Ret	Ret	Ret	Ret	10	8	6	10	9	Ret	Ret				12
15	(Australia) Kevin Magee	Team Lucky Strike-Roberts	YZR500	NC						10						3			11
16	(United States) Kevin Schwantz	Heron-Suzuki	RGV500		5		8				9								11
17	(Japan) Takumi Ito	Heron-Suzuki	RGV500	3															10
18	(United States) Mike Baldwin	Team Lucky Strike Roberts	YZR500	Ret	Ret	DNS											10	6	6
19	(West Germany) Gustav Reiner	Hein Gericke Racing	RS500	Ret	Ret	9	Ret	Ret	Ret		Ret	Ret			9	10			5
20	(Japan) Hiroyuki Kawasaki	Yamaha Japan	YZR500	7															4
21	(United States) Freddie Spencer	Rothmans Honda-HRC	NSR500						DNS				7	11	Ret		DNS		4
22	(Australia) Richard Scott		RS500		10	13	13						11		Ret				3
22	(Australia) Richard Scott	Team Lucky Strike Roberts	YZR500					11	9	Ret	Ret	13		13					3
23	(Japan) Shinji Katayama	Yamaha Japan	YZR500	9															2
24	(Switzerland) Marco Gentile	Lucky Strike Fior	Fior RS500	Ret	12	Ret	Ret	Ret	23	13	11	14	21	Ret	10	Ret	12	11	1
	(Switzerland) Bruno Kneubühler	Bruno Kneubühler	RS500		18	11	14	Ret	15	21	Ret	17	14	Ret	15	11			0
	(United Kingdom) Ray Swann	Aldridge Racing	RS500							11	DNS	Ret	22	Ret	14	13			0
	(Spain) Daniel Amatriain	Amatriain Racing	RS500		16	19	Ret			22	17				11	Ret			0
	(Japan) Norio Iobe		RS500	11															0
	(Italy) Fabio Biliotti	Servisco	RS500		Ret	14	20	13	12	DNS		15	12	Ret	Ret	Ret			0
	(West Germany) Manfred Fischer	Hein Gericke Racing	RS500			Ret	12	18		Ret	12	Ret	15		16				0
	(United Kingdom) Simon Buckmaster	Duckhams NLM Honda	RS500	13	15	20	DNS	17	16	12	13	Ret	17	17	18	14			0
	(Switzerland) Wolfgang von Muralt	Frankonia-Suzuki	RG500	14	17		Ret	14	14	Ret	Ret	16	Ret	Ret	Ret	12	13	DNS	0
	(Italy) Alessandro Valesi	Team Iberna	RS500	Ret	14	DNS	18	15	13	Ret	Ret	19	Ret	Ret	12	Ret			0
	(West Germany) Gerhard Vogt		RG500													17	15	12	0
	(Japan) Hisashi Yamana	Yamaha Japan	YZR500	12															0
	(San Marino) Fabio Barchitta	La Vigile San Marco	RS500			16	17		17	15	Ret	24	18	16	13	Ret			0
	(Belgium) Vincenzo Cascino		RG500											22		18	14	13	0
	(France) Thierry Rapicault	Fior-SNCF	RS500		13	Ret	Ret												0
	(Socialist Federal Republic of Yugoslavia) Silvo Habat	FE-GO	RS500			Ret		21	Ret	19	14	25		Ret	Ret				0
	(Italy) Massimo Broccoli		RS500				15		18					15	Ret				0
	(Netherlands) Maarten Duyzers	H.D.J. B.Y.	RS500		19	22	DNS	22			15	23	20			DNS			0
	(Finland) Esko Kuparinen		YZR500	15		Ret	22												0
	(Netherlands) Henry Boerman	Assmex	Assmex									26							0
	(Netherlands) Henry Boerman		RS500													15			0
	(United Kingdom) Donnie MacLeod	Heron-Suzuki	RGV500			15													0
	(West Germany) Gerold Fischer	Rallye Sport	RS500		Ret	21	Ret	19	21	16			24	18					0
	(Italy) Marco Papa		RS500			18	16			DNS					17				0
	(Austria) Karl Truchsess	Shell-DAF Trucks	RS500				16		Ret					Ret	20				0
	(United Kingdom) Ian Pratt		RS500								20					16			0
	(Italy) Vittorio Scatola	Paton	Paton				21		Ret		16				Ret				0
	(Sweden) Peter Sköld		RS500										16						0
	(United Kingdom) Steve Manley		RG500			23		24		17									0
	(Finland) Ari Rämö		RS500			17					Ret		23						0
	(France) Herve Guilleux	Fior-SNCF	RS500					20	20		Ret	18	Ret	Ret		Ret			0
	(France) Daniel Pauget		RS500								18								0
	(France) Jean-Luc Maisto		RS500		20						22		19						0
	(France) Jean-Luc Maisto	Plein-Pot	Plein-Pot						Ret			21							0
	(Austria) Rudolf Zeller		RS500					25						19					0
	(Luxembourg) Andreas Leuthe	Andy Leuthe	RS500			Ret	Ret	19		Ret									0
	(Italy) Vittorio Gibertini		RG500				19								Ret				0
	(France) Rachel Nicotte		RG500								19								0
	(Italy) Romolo Balbi		RS500												19				0
	(Austria) Josef Doppler		RS500					Ret						20					0
	(United Kingdom) Joey Dunlop	Shell Gemini	RS500									20							0
	(Republic of Ireland) Tony Carey		RG500		21											Ret			0
	(United Kingdom) Alan Jeffery		RG500							Ret	21								0
	(Denmark) Claus Wulff		RS500										Ret	21					0
	(Italy) Marco Marchesani		RG500				Ret								21				0
	(West Germany) Georg Jung		RS500			24		23	22										0
	(Switzerland) Christoph Bürki		RS500		22			Ret											0
	(United Kingdom) Alan Irwin		RS500									22							0
	(Czechoslovak Socialist Republic) Pavol Dekanek		RS500						Ret				Ret	23					0
	(Venezuela) Larry Moreno Vacondio		RG500											24		Ret			0
	(West Germany) Helmut Schütz		RS500			25		Ret	Ret										0
	(Greece) Dimitrios Papandreou		RG500						25										0
	(Netherlands) Geir Hestmann		RG500										25						0
	(Austria) Dietmar Marehardt		RG500											25					0
	(West Germany) Michael Rudroff		RS500			Ret		Ret											0
	(United Kingdom) Mark Phillips		RS500							Ret		Ret							0
	(Japan) Susumu Shimada		RG500	Ret															0
	(Japan) Norihiko Fujiwara	Yamaha Japan	YZR500	Ret															0
	(Japan) Keiji Kinoshita	Rothmans Honda-HRC	NSR500	Ret															0
	(Japan) Masaru Mizutani		RG500	Ret															0
	(Spain) José Parra		RG500		Ret														0
	(Austria) Franz Kaserer		RG500					Ret											0
	(Netherlands) Rob Punt		RG500							Ret									0
	(Netherlands) Henk van der Mark		RG500							Ret									0
	(Netherlands) Kees van der Endt		RS500								Ret								0
	(United Kingdom) Roger Marshall	Skoal Bandit Heron Suzuki	RG500									Ret							0
	(United Kingdom) Andy McGladdery		RS500									Ret							0
	(United Kingdom) Steve Henshaw		RS500									Ret							0
	(Sweden) Peter Linden	Team Sweden	RS500										Ret						0
	(Italy) Leandro Becheroni		RS500												Ret				0
	(Japan) Osamu Hiwatashi		RS500	DNS															0
	(United States) Kenny Roberts	Team Lucky Strike Roberts	YZR500				DNS												0
	(Netherlands) Koos van Leijen		RG500							DNS									0
	(West Germany) Rolf Aljes		RGS500								DNS								0
Pos.	Rider	Bike	Team	JPN (Japan)	ESP (Spain)	GER (West Germany)	NAT (Italy)	AUT (Austria)	YUG (Socialist Federal Republic of Yugoslavia)	NED (Netherlands)	FRA (France)	GBR (United Kingdom)	SWE (Sweden)	TCH (Czechoslovakia)	SMR (San Marino)	POR (Portugal)	BRA (Brazil)	ARG (Argentina)	Pts

=== 250cc standings ===
Place	Rider	Number	Country	Team	Machine	Points	Wins
1	(West Germany) Anton Mang	4	West Germany	Rothmans-Honda	NSR250	136	8
2	(West Germany) Reinhold Roth	24	West Germany	HB Römer-Honda	NSR250	108	1
3	(Spain) Sito Pons	2	Spain	Campsa-Honda	NSR250	108	1
4	(France) Dominique Sarron	3	France	Rothmans-Honda France	NSR250	97	1
5	(Spain) Carlos Cardús	12	Spain	Ducados-Honda	NSR250	70	0
6	(Italy) Loris Reggiani	32	Italy	Aprilia	RS250	68	1
7	(Italy) Luca Cadalora	22	Italy	Marlboro-Yamaha	YZR250	63	0
8	(West Germany) Martin Wimmer	6	West Germany	Marlboro-Yamaha	YZR250	61	1
9	(Switzerland) Jacques Cornu	7	Switzerland	Parisienne Elf-Honda	NSR250	50	0
10	(Venezuela) Carlos Lavado	1	Venezuela	HB Venemotos-Yamaha	YZR250	46	1
11	(Spain) Juan Garriga	31	Spain	Ducados-Yamaha	YZR250	46	
12	(France) Patrick Igoa	17	France	Yamaha	YZR250	42	
13	(Japan) Masahiro Shimizu		Japan	Honda		20	
14	(Japan) Masaru Kobayashi		Japan	Honda		15	1
15	(West Germany) Manfred Herweh		West Germany			11	
16	(Venezuela) Ivan Palazzese	49	Venezuela	Yamaha	YZR250	9	
17	(France) Jean Philippe Ruggia		France	Yamaha	YZR250	7	
18	(France) Jean-François Baldé		France			6	
19	(Italy) Maurizio Vitali		Italy			6	
20	(Austria) Hans Lindner		Austria			5	
21	(Switzerland) Urs Lüzi		Switzerland			5	
22	(United Kingdom) Donnie McLeod		United Kingdom			4	
23	(Belgium) Stephane Mertens	14	Belgium			2	
24	(Japan) Masumitsu Taguchi		Japan			2	
25	(France) Guy Bertin		France			1	
26	(Italy) Stefano Caracchi		France			1	
27	(Japan) Takayoshi Yamamoto		Japan			1	

=== 125cc standings ===
Place	Rider	Number	Country	Machine	Points	Wins
1	(Italy) Fausto Gresini	2	Italy	Garelli	150	10
2	(Italy) Bruno Casanova	23	Italy	Garelli	88	0
3	(Italy) Paolo Casoli	14	Italy	AGV	61	1
4	(Italy) Domenico Brigaglia	3	Italy	AGV	58	0
5	(Austria) August Auinger	4	Austria	MBA	54	0
6	(Italy) Ezio Gianola	5	Italy	Honda	45	0
7	(Italy) Pier Paolo Bianchi	8	Italy	MBA	43	0
8	(Spain) Andres Sanchez	26	Spain	Ducados	40	0
9	(Belgium) Lucio Pietroniro	7	Belgium	MBA	32	0
10	(Austria) Mike Leitner	22	Austria	MBA	32	0
11	(Finland) Johnny Wickstroem		Finland		21	
12	(Italy) Gastone Grassetti		Italy		17	
13	(France) Jean Claude Selini		France		16	
14	(Switzerland) Thierry Feuz		Switzerland		13	
15	(Finland) Jussi Hautaniemi		Finland		10	
16	(West Germany) Adi Stadler		West Germany		9	
17	(Venezuela) Ivan Troisi		Venezuela		8	
18	(Italy) Claudio Macciotta		Italy		6	
19	(Italy) Corrado Catalano		Italy		6	
20	(Finland) Esa Kytölä		Finland		4	
21	(Belgium) Olivier Liégeois		Belgium		4	
22	(Sweden) Hakan Olsson		Sweden		2	
23	(United Kingdom) Robin Milton		United Kingdom		2	
24	(Algeria) Bady Hassaine		Algeria		2	
25	(Denmark) Flemming Kistrup		Denmark		1	
26	(West Germany) Norbert Peschke		West Germany		1	
27	(Argentina) Willy Perez		Argentina		1	

=== 80cc standings ===
Place	Rider	Number	Country	Machine	Points	Wins
1	(Spain) Jorge Martínez	1	Spain	Derbi	129	7
2	(Spain) Manuel Herreros	2	Spain	Derbi	86	1
3	(West Germany) Gerhard Waibel	5	West Germany	Krauser	82	1
4	(Switzerland) Stefan Dörflinger	3	Switzerland	Krauser	75	1
5	(United Kingdom) Ian McConnachie	5	United Kingdom	Krauser	53	0
6	(West Germany) Jörg Seel	6	West Germany	Seel	38	0
7	(West Germany) Hubert Abold	9	West Germany	Krauser	33	0
8	(Spain) Luis Reyes	22	Spain	Autisa	31	0
9	(Austria) Josef Fischer	9	Austria	Krauser	19	0
10	(Spain) Julián Miralles		Spain	Derbi	18	0
11	(Spain) Àlex Crivillé				12	
12	Günter Schirnhofer				12	
13	Hans Spaan				11	
14	Karoly Juhasz				10	
15	Joan Bolart				10	
16	Paolo Priori				9	
17	(Brazil) Alex Barros		Brazil		8	
18	Giuseppe Ascareggi				5	
19	Heinz Paschen				4	
20	Richard Bay				3	
21	Peter Öttl				3	
22	Ernst Gschwender				2	
23	Herri Torrontegui				1	
24	Theo Timmer				1	
25	Jacques Bernard				1	
26	Ralf Waldmann				1	
