= 1987 Japanese motorcycle Grand Prix =

1987 Japan Grand Prix
Race details
- Race 1 of 15 races in the 1987 Grand Prix motorcycle racing season
- Date: March 29 1987
- Official name: Grand Prix of Japan
- Location: Suzuka Circuit
- Course: Permanent racing facility; 5.864 km (3.644 mi)

500cc
Pole position
Rider	(United Kingdom) Niall Mackenzie	Honda
Time	2:14.320	
Fastest lap
Rider	(United States) Randy Mamola	Yamaha
Time	2:34.600	
Podium
First	(United States) Randy Mamola	
Second	(Australia) Wayne Gardner	
Third	(Japan) Takumi Ito	

250cc
Pole position
Rider	(Japan) Masahiro Shimizu	Honda
Time	2:18.720	
Fastest lap
Rider	(Japan) Masaru Kobayashi	Honda
Time	2:19.680	
Podium
First	(Japan) Masaru Kobayashi	
Second	(Spain) Sito Pons	
Third	(West Germany) Reinhold Roth	

125cc
Pole position
- Rider: No 125cc was held
Fastest lap
- Rider: No 125cc was held
Podium
- First: No 125cc was held
- Second: No 125cc was held
- Third: No 125cc was held

80cc
Pole position
- Rider: No 80cc was held
Fastest lap
- Rider: No 80cc was held
Podium
- First: No 80cc was held
- Second: No 80cc was held
- Third: No 80cc was held

The 1987 Japanese motorcycle Grand Prix was the first round of the 1987 Grand Prix motorcycle racing season. It took place on the weekend of 27–29 March 1987 at the Suzuka Circuit.

== Classification ==
=== 500 cc ===
Pos.	Rider	Team	Manufacturer	Time/Retired	Points
1	(United States) Randy Mamola	Team Lucky Strike Roberts	Yamaha	57'22.880	15
2	(Australia) Wayne Gardner	Rothmans Honda Team	Honda	+42.390	12
3	(Japan) Takumi Ito	Suzuki Japan	Suzuki	+51.300	10
4	(Italy) Pierfrancesco Chili	HB Honda Gallina Team	Honda	+1'20.360	8
5	(United Kingdom) Ron Haslam	Team ROC Elf Honda	Honda	+1'22.950	6
6	(Japan) Tadahiko Taira	Marlboro Yamaha Team Agostini	Yamaha	+1'38.680	5
7	(Japan) Hiroyuki Kawasaki	Yamaha Motor Company	Yamaha	+1'40.070	4
8	(United Kingdom) Roger Burnett	Rothmans Honda Team	Honda	+2'08.260	3
9	(Japan) Shinji Katayama	Yamaha Motor Company	Yamaha	+2'16.340	2
10	(France) Raymond Roche	Cagiva-Bastos-Alstare	Cagiva	+2'28.180	1
11	(Japan) Norio Iobe	Technical Sports Kanto	Honda	+1 lap	
12	(Japan) Hisashi Yamana		Suzuki	+1 lap	
13	(United Kingdom) Simon Buckmaster		Honda	+1 lap	
14	(Switzerland) Wolfgang von Muralt		Suzuki	+1 lap	
15	(Finland) Esko Kuparinen		Honda	+1 lap	
Ret	(United States) Mike Baldwin	Team Lucky Strike Roberts	Yamaha	Accident	
Ret	(Japan) Norihiko Fujiwara	Moto Shop Kajigaya Racing	Yamaha	Retired	
Ret	(Switzerland) Marco Gentile	Fior	Fior	Retired	
Ret	(United Kingdom) Kenny Irons	Heron Suzuki GB	Suzuki	Retired	
Ret	(Japan) Keiji Kinoshita	Team HRC	Honda	Accident	
Ret	(United Kingdom) Rob McElnea	Marlboro Yamaha Team Agostini	Yamaha	Retired	
Ret	(United States) Eddie Lawson	Marlboro Yamaha Team Agostini	Yamaha	Retired	
Ret	(Australia) Kevin Magee	Yamaha Motor Company	Yamaha	Accident	
Ret	(United Kingdom) Niall Mackenzie	Team HRC	Honda	Accident	
Ret	(France) Christian Sarron	Sonauto Gauloises Jack Germain	Yamaha	Accident	
Ret	(Japan) Masaru Mizutani	Walter Wolf Suzuki MIIP	Suzuki	Retired	
Ret	(Belgium) Didier de Radiguès	Cagiva-Bastos-Alstare	Cagiva	Retired	
Ret	(Japan) Shunji Yatsushiro	Rothmans Honda Team	Honda	Accident	
Ret	(West Germany) Gustav Reiner	Team Hein Gericke	Honda	Retired	
Ret	(Japan) Susumu Shimada	SRS Sugaya	Suzuki	Retired	
Ret	(Italy) Alessandro Valesi		Honda	Retired	
DNS	(Japan) Osamu Hiwatashi	Moriwaki Racing	Honda	Did not start	
DNS	(United States) Freddie Spencer	Team HRC	Honda	Did not start	

Previous race: 1986 Baden-Württemberg Grand Prix	FIM Grand Prix World Championship; 1987 season	Next race: 1987 Spanish Grand Prix
Previous race: 1967 Japanese Grand Prix	Japanese Grand Prix	Next race: 1988 Japanese Grand Prix
