= 1987 Spanish motorcycle Grand Prix =

(Spain) 1987 Spanish Grand Prix
Race details
- Race 2 of 15 races in the 1987 Grand Prix motorcycle racing season
- Date: 26 April 1987
- Official name: Marlboro Gran Premio de España
- Location: Circuito Permanente de Jerez
- Course: Permanent racing facility; 4.428 km (2.751 mi)

500cc
Pole position
- Rider: (United States) Eddie Lawson
- Time: 1:50.690
Fastest lap
- Rider: Unknown
Podium
- First: (Australia) Wayne Gardner
- Second: (United States) Eddie Lawson
- Third: (United Kingdom) Ron Haslam

250cc
Pole position
- Rider: (Italy) Luca Cadalora
- Time: 1:52.200
Fastest lap
- Rider: Unknown
Podium
- First: (West Germany) Martin Wimmer
- Second: (Italy) Luca Cadalora
- Third: (Spain) Juan Garriga

125cc
Pole position
- Rider: (Italy) Domenico Brigaglia
- Time: 1:57.590
Fastest lap
- Rider: Unknown
Podium
- First: (Italy) Fausto Gresini
- Second: (Italy) Domenico Brigaglia
- Third: (Italy) Paolo Casoli

80cc
Pole position
- Rider: (Spain) Jorge Martínez
- Time: 2:02.790
Fastest lap
- Rider: Unknown
Podium
- First: (Spain) Jorge Martínez
- Second: (Spain) Àlex Crivillé
- Third: (Spain) Julián Miralles

The 1987 Spanish motorcycle Grand Prix was the second round of the 1987 Grand Prix motorcycle racing season. It took place on the weekend of 23–26 April 1987 at the Circuito Permanente de Jerez.

== Classification ==
=== 500 cc ===
Pos.	Rider	Team	Manufacturer	Time/Retired	Points
1	(Australia) Wayne Gardner	Rothmans Honda Team	Honda	56'02.070	15
2	(United States) Eddie Lawson	Marlboro Yamaha Team Agostini	Yamaha	+23.550	12
3	(United Kingdom) Ron Haslam	Team ROC Elf Honda	Honda	+49.090	10
4	(United Kingdom) Niall Mackenzie	Team HRC	Honda	+50.690	8
5	(United States) Kevin Schwantz	Heron Suzuki GB	Suzuki	+1'10.470	6
6	(United States) Randy Mamola	Team Lucky Strike Roberts	Yamaha	+1'12.810	5
7	(Japan) Tadahiko Taira	Marlboro Yamaha Team Agostini	Yamaha	+1'14.210	4
8	(Japan) Shunji Yatsushiro	Rothmans Honda Team	Honda	+1'18.260	3
9	(United Kingdom) Roger Burnett	Rothmans Honda Team	Honda	+1'40.040	2
10	(New Zealand) Richard Scott	Honda GB	Honda	+1'45.040	1
Ret	(Italy) Pierfrancesco Chili	HB Honda Gallina Team	Honda	+1'56.000	
12	(Switzerland) Marco Gentile	Fior	Fior	+1 lap	
13	(France) Thierry Rapicault	Fior	Fior	+1 lap	
14	(Italy) Alessandro Valesi		Honda	+1 lap	
15	(United Kingdom) Simon Buckmaster		Honda	+1 lap	
16	(Spain) Daniel Vila Amatriain		Honda	+1 lap	
17	(Switzerland) Wolfgang von Muralt		Suzuki	+1 lap	
18	(Switzerland) Bruno Kneubühler		Honda	+1 lap	
19	(Netherlands) Maarten Duyzers		Honda	+2 laps	
20	(France) Louis-Luc Maisto		Honda	+2 laps	
21	(United Kingdom) Tony Carey		Suzuki	+4 laps	
Ret	(United States) Mike Baldwin	Team Lucky Strike Roberts	Yamaha	Clutch	
Ret	(Italy) Fabio Biliotti		Honda	Retired	
Ret	(West Germany) Gerold Fischer		Honda	Retired	
Ret	(United Kingdom) Kenny Irons	Heron Suzuki GB	Suzuki	Accident	
Ret	(United Kingdom) Rob McElnea	Marlboro Yamaha Team Agostini	Yamaha	Accident	
Ret	(Spain) José Parra		Suzuki	Retired	
Ret	(Belgium) Didier de Radiguès	Cagiva-Bastos-Alstare	Cagiva	Brake problems	
Ret	(West Germany) Gustav Reiner	Team Hein Gericke	Honda	Accident	
Ret	(France) Raymond Roche	Cagiva-Bastos-Alstare	Cagiva	Retired	
Ret	(France) Christian Sarron	Sonauto Gauloises Jack Germain	Yamaha	Accident	
DNQ	(Venezuela) Larry Moreno Vacondio		Suzuki	Did not qualify	

Previous race: 1987 Japanese Grand Prix	FIM Grand Prix World Championship; 1987 season	Next race: 1987 German Grand Prix
Previous race: 1986 Spanish Grand Prix	Spanish motorcycle Grand Prix	Next race: 1988 Spanish Grand Prix
