= 1987 Brazilian motorcycle Grand Prix =

(Brazil) 1987 Brazilian Grand Prix
Race details
- Race 14 of 15 races in the 1987 Grand Prix motorcycle racing season
- Date: 27 September 1987
- Official name: GP Brasil
- Location: Autódromo Internacional de Goiânia
- Course: Permanent racing facility; 3.835 km (2.383 mi)

500cc
Pole position
- Rider: (Australia) Wayne Gardner
- Time: 1:27.360
Fastest lap
- Rider: (Australia) Wayne Gardner
- Time: 1:28.790
Podium
- First: (Australia) Wayne Gardner
- Second: (United States) Eddie Lawson
- Third: (United States) Randy Mamola

250cc
Pole position
- Rider: (France) Dominique Sarron
- Time: 1:30.290
Fastest lap
- Rider: (Spain) Sito Pons
- Time: 1:31.250
Podium
- First: (France) Dominique Sarron
- Second: (Spain) Sito Pons
- Third: (Spain) Carlos Cardús

125cc
Pole position
- Rider: No 125cc was held
Fastest lap
- Rider: No 125cc was held
Podium
- First: No 125cc was held
- Second: No 125cc was held
- Third: No 125cc was held

80cc
Pole position
- Rider: No 80cc was held
Fastest lap
- Rider: No 80cc was held
Podium
- First: No 80cc was held
- Second: No 80cc was held
- Third: No 80cc was held

The 1987 Brazilian motorcycle Grand Prix was the penultimate round of the 1987 Grand Prix motorcycle racing season. It took place on the weekend of 26–27 September 1987 at the Autódromo Internacional de Goiânia.

== Classification ==
=== 500 cc ===
Pos.	Rider	Team	Manufacturer	Time/Retired	Points
1	(Australia) Wayne Gardner	Rothmans Honda Team	Honda	47'39.570	15
2	(United States) Eddie Lawson	Marlboro Yamaha Team Agostini	Yamaha	+5.190	12
3	(United States) Randy Mamola	Team Lucky Strike Roberts	Yamaha	+12.610	10
4	(Belgium) Didier de Radiguès	Cagiva-Bastos-Alstare	Cagiva	+24.420	8
5	(France) Christian Sarron	Sonauto Gauloises Jack Germain	Yamaha	+25.590	6
6	(Japan) Shunji Yatsushiro	Rothmans Honda Team	Honda	+42.330	5
7	(Japan) Tadahiko Taira	Marlboro Yamaha Team Agostini	Yamaha	+51.710	4
8	(United Kingdom) Niall Mackenzie	Team HRC	Honda	+56.690	3
9	(Italy) Pierfrancesco Chili	HB Honda Gallina Team	Honda	+1'01.120	2
10	(United States) Mike Baldwin	Team Lucky Strike Roberts	Yamaha	+1'03.720	1
11	(United Kingdom) Ron Haslam	Team ROC Elf Honda	Honda	+1 lap	
12	(Switzerland) Marco Gentile		Fior	+1 lap	
13	(Switzerland) Wolfgang Von Muralt		Suzuki	+1 lap	
14	(Italy) Vincenzo Cascino		Suzuki	+3 laps	
15	(West Germany) Gerhard Vogt		Suzuki	+3 laps	
Ret	(France) Raymond Roche	Cagiva-Bastos-Alstare	Cagiva	Retired	
Ret	(United Kingdom) Rob McElnea	Marlboro Yamaha Team Agostini	Yamaha	Accident	
DNS	(United States) Freddie Spencer	Team HRC	Honda	Did not start	

Previous race: 1987 Portuguese Grand Prix	FIM Grand Prix World Championship; 1987 season	Next race: 1987 Argentine Grand Prix
Previous race: None	Brazilian Grand Prix	Next race: 1988 Brazilian Grand Prix
