= 1987 Argentine motorcycle Grand Prix =

(Argentina) 1987 Argentine Grand Prix
Race details
- Race 15 of 15 races in the 1987 Grand Prix motorcycle racing season
- Date: 4 October 1987
- Official name: Gran Prix da la República Argentina
- Location: Autódromo Juan y Oscar Gálvez
- Course: Permanent racing facility; 3.388 km (2.105 mi)

500cc
Pole position
- Rider: (Australia) Wayne Gardner
- Time: 1:21.560
Fastest lap
- Rider: Unknown
Podium
- First: (United States) Eddie Lawson
- Second: (United States) Randy Mamola
- Third: (Australia) Wayne Gardner

250cc
Pole position
- Rider: Unknown
Fastest lap
- Rider: Unknown
Podium
- First: (Spain) Sito Pons
- Second: (France) Dominique Sarron
- Third: (Japan) Masahiro Shimizu

125cc
Pole position
- Rider: No 125cc was held
Fastest lap
- Rider: No 125cc was held
Podium
- First: No 125cc was held
- Second: No 125cc was held
- Third: No 125cc was held

80cc
Pole position
- Rider: No 80cc was held
Fastest lap
- Rider: No 80cc was held
Podium
- First: No 80cc was held
- Second: No 80cc was held
- Third: No 80cc was held

The 1987 Argentine motorcycle Grand Prix was the last round of the 1987 Grand Prix motorcycle racing season. It took place on 4 October 1987 at the Autódromo Oscar Alfredo Gálvez.

== Classification ==
=== 500 cc ===
Pos.	Rider	Team	Manufacturer	Time/Retired	Points
1	(United States) Eddie Lawson	Marlboro Yamaha Team Agostini	Yamaha	46'38.220	15
2	(United States) Randy Mamola	Team Lucky Strike Roberts	Yamaha	+11.420	12
3	(Australia) Wayne Gardner	Rothmans Honda Team	Honda	+14.060	10
4	(Japan) Shunji Yatsushiro	Rothmans Honda Team	Honda	+35.830	8
5	(France) Raymond Roche	Cagiva-Bastos-Alstare	Cagiva	+50.100	6
6	(United States) Mike Baldwin	Team Lucky Strike Roberts	Yamaha	+50.370	5
7	(United Kingdom) Niall Mackenzie	Team HRC	Honda	+51.180	4
8	(Japan) Tadahiko Taira	Marlboro Yamaha Team Agostini	Yamaha	+1'14.430	3
9	(Italy) Pierfrancesco Chili	HB Honda Gallina Team	Honda	+1 lap	2
10	(United Kingdom) Ron Haslam	Team ROC Elf Honda	Honda	+1 lap	1
11	(Switzerland) Marco Gentile	Fior	Fior	+1 lap	
12	(West Germany) Gerhard Vogt		Suzuki	+2 laps	
13	(Italy) Vincenzo Cascino		Suzuki	+2 laps	
Ret	(Belgium) Didier de Radiguès	Cagiva-Bastos-Alstare	Cagiva	Retired	
Ret	(France) Christian Sarron	Sonauto Gauloises Jack Germain	Yamaha	Retired	
DNS	(United Kingdom) Rob McElnea	Marlboro Yamaha Team Agostini	Yamaha	Did not start	
DNS	(Switzerland) Wolfgang Von Muralt		Suzuki	Did not start	

Previous race: 1987 Brazilian Grand Prix	FIM Grand Prix World Championship; 1987 season	Next race: 1988 Japanese Grand Prix
Previous race: 1982 Argentine Grand Prix	Argentine Grand Prix	Next race: 1994 Argentine Grand Prix
