= Gerhard Waibel (motorcyclist) =

German motorcycle racer

- Nationality: German
Motorcycle racing career statistics
Grand Prix motorcycle racing
Active years	1979 - 1989
First race	1979 50cc German Grand Prix
Last race	1989 125cc Austrian Grand Prix
First win	1979 50cc German Grand Prix
Last win	1987 80cc German Grand Prix
Starts / Wins / Podiums / Poles / F. laps / Points; 69 / 4 / 11 / 1 / 0 / 178

Gerhard Waibel (born 17 December 1958) is a former Grand Prix motorcycle road racer from Germany. His best year was in 1987, when he finished third in the 80cc world championship. Waibel won four Grand Prix races during his career.
