= Hervé Guilleux =

French motorcycle racer

- Nationality: French
Motorcycle racing career statistics
Grand Prix motorcycle racing
Active years	1979, 1981, 1983 - 1984, 1987
First race	1979 350cc French Grand Prix
Last race	1987 500cc Portuguese Grand Prix
First win	1983 250cc Spanish Grand Prix
Last win	1983 250cc Spanish Grand Prix
Starts / Wins / Podiums / Poles / F. laps / Points; 28 / 1 / 4 / 0 / 0 / 81

Hervé Guilleux (born 15 February 1956) is a French former Grand Prix motorcycle road racer. His best year was in 1983, where he won the 250cc Spanish Grand Prix and finished the season in fourth part place in the 250cc world championship.

== Career statistics ==
=== FIM Endurance World Championship ===
Year	Bike	Rider	TC
1982	Kawasaki Heavy Industries	(France) Hervé Guilleux (France) Jean Lafond	2nd
