= Marco Gentile (motorcyclist) =

Italian motorcycle racer

- Nationality: Switzerland
- Born: August 21, 1959; Geneva, Switzerland
Motorcycle racing career statistics
MotoGP World Championship
Active years	1984-1989
Manufacturers	Fior Marlboro
Championships	0
1989 championship position	17th (33 pts)
Starts / Wins / Podiums / Poles / F. laps / Points; 62 / 0 / 0 / 0 / 0 / 42

Marco Gentile (21 August 1959 - 18 November 1989) was a Swiss Grand Prix motorcycle racer who competed in the 500 cc World Championship throughout the 1980s. Known for his long association with the innovative Fior engineering project, Gentile raced in the premier class from 1984 until his death in 1989, achieving his best season in 1989 with a 17th-place finish in the championship. He was regarded as a determined privateer competitor during an era dominated by major factory teams.

== Career ==
=== Early career ===
After graduating from a technical institute with a diploma in automotive mechanics, Gentile began motorcycle racing in 1980, entering the Swiss junior championship and winning his first race of the season.

Gentile became Swiss vice-champion in the 250cc class in 1982, and the following year, he competed in the European Championship in the 250 cc category.

In 1984, Gentile moved to the 500cc class, finishing the European Championship in 31st place, and made his World Championship debut at the Spanish Grand Prix, retiring after five laps.

Progressing through the domestic 250cc and 500cc categories, Gentile's performances at the national level led to opportunities in the European Championship, where he gained experience before entering Grand Prix competition.

=== 500 cc World Championship ===
==== Fior (1984-1989) ====
===== 1984 =====
Gentile made his first appearances in the premier class aboard machinery developed by the French engineer Claude Fior. The Fior project, known for its unconventional front-end suspension and innovative chassis design, operated as a privateer effort competing against factory-supported teams.

===== 1985 =====
Gentile continued to work with the Fior team while also competing in the European 500 cc Championship, which he won that year. He also participated in select rounds of the 500cc World Championship. During the French Grand Prix he met engineer Claude Fior, whose innovative 500 cc machines would become central to Gentile's racing career.

===== 1986 =====
In 1986, Gentile extended his collaboration with Fior, riding the French technician's experimental 500 cc machine in several World Championship rounds. His best result of the season was an 11th-place finish at the Swedish Grand Prix, narrowly missing the points zone.

===== 1987 =====
In 1987, Gentile started 15 races with Fior and scored his first World Championship point, finishing the season 24th overall. His best result was a tenth place at the San Marino Grand Prix, which marked the first-ever championship point for both Gentile and the Fior project.

===== 1988 =====
In 1988, Gentile made 15 race starts for Fior Marlboro, scoring eight championship points and finishing 23rd in the standings.

===== 1989 =====
In 1989, Gentile and Fior achieved their strongest season together, scoring points in most of the Grands Prix. Their best finish was a fourth place at the Nations Grand Prix, a race boycotted by most factory teams. Gentile ended the season 17th in the championship, tied on points with factory Cagiva rider Randy Mamola. At the end of the season, Gentile and Fior began developing a new 250 cc Grand Prix prototype powered by a Rotax engine for the 1990 campaign. While testing a kart at the Nogaro circuit, Gentile lost control and collided with a guard rail, dying instantly.

=== Career summary ===
Across his 500 cc Grand Prix career, Gentile made a total of 42 race starts and scored 42 championship points between 1984 and 1989. Throughout his time in the world championship, he remained closely associated with the Fior engineering project, becoming the rider who most extensively developed and raced Claude Fior's unconventional 500 cc machines.

Gentile's progression reflected both his growing experience and the technical evolution of the Fior project: from early non-scoring seasons to his first championship.

== Death ==
On 18 November 1989, Gentile was taking part in private testing with a homemade go-kart equipped with a Yamaha TZ 350 engine at the Circuit de Nogaro in France. During the session, he lost control of the kart and collided with a guard rail, suffering fatal injuries. He died at the scene. Gentile had been preparing for the upcoming season with the Fior team at the time of the accident, and his death brought an abrupt end to a career closely linked with the experimental engineering work of Claude Fior.

== Grand Prix results ==
=== 500 cc ===
Year	Class	Bike	JPN	AUS	ESP	NATIONS	GER	NED	BEL	YUG	FRA	GBR	SWE	AUT	CZE	RSM	HUN	BRA	Pos	Pts	
1984	500 cc	Yamaha	Ret	-	-	-	-	-	-	-	Ret	-	15	-	-	-	-	-	NC	0	
1985	500 cc	Yamaha / Honda	-	-	14	-	-	-	-	-	Ret	-	-	-	-	-	-	-	NC	0	
1986	500 cc	Fior-Honda	19	Ret	Ret	Ret	15	11	Ret	12	Ret	11	Ret	NE	-	-	-	-	NC	0	
1987	500 cc	Fior-Honda	Ret	12	Ret	Ret	Ret	23	13	11	14	21	Ret	10	Ret	12	11	-	24th	1	
1988	500 cc	Fior	Ret	Ret	Ret	Ret	14	17	Ret	15	30	Ret	17	20	19	11	Ret	-	24th	8	
1989	500 cc	Fior	20	13	12	12	4	Ret	14	Ret	14	12	Ret	13	NP	-	-	-	-	17th	33
Total																			42		
