= Alberto Puig =

Spanish motorcycle racer

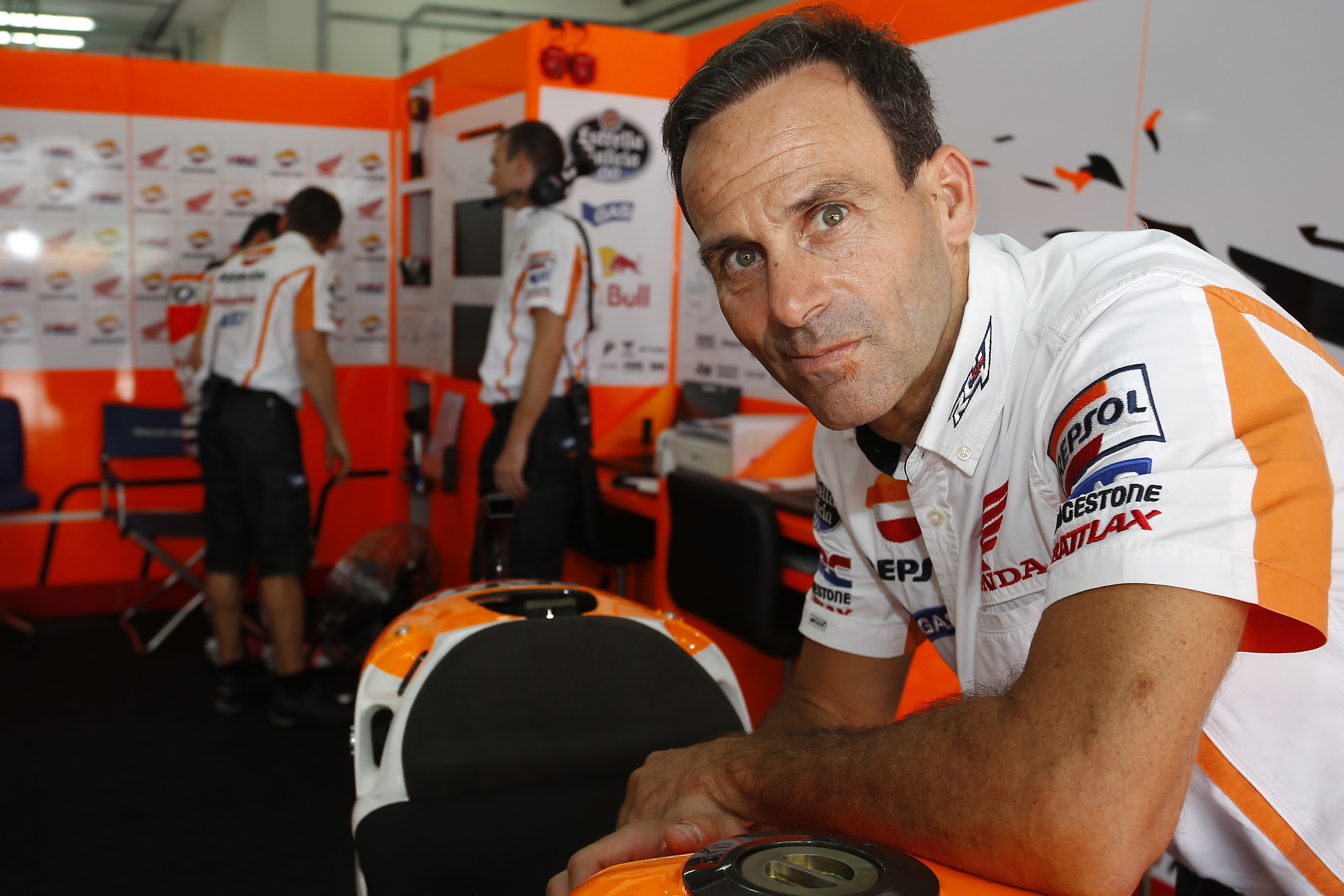
- Puig in the Repsol Honda garage during 2013
- Nationality: Spanish
- Born: 16 January 1967 (age 59); Barcelona, Spain
Motorcycle racing career statistics
Grand Prix motorcycle racing
Active years	1987 – 1997
First race	1987 250cc Dutch TT
Last race	1997 500cc Australian Grand Prix
First win	1995 500cc Spanish Grand Prix
Last win	1995 500cc Spanish Grand Prix
Team	Honda
Championships	0
Starts / Wins / Podiums / Poles / F. laps / Points; 125 / 1 / 9 / 0 / 1 / 672

Alberto Puig de la Rosa (born 16 January 1967) is a Spanish former Grand Prix solo motorcycle professional road racer who is team manager for the Honda HRC Castrol team in MotoGP. In 1988, Puig won the Spanish 250cc Championship.

== Motorcycle racing career ==
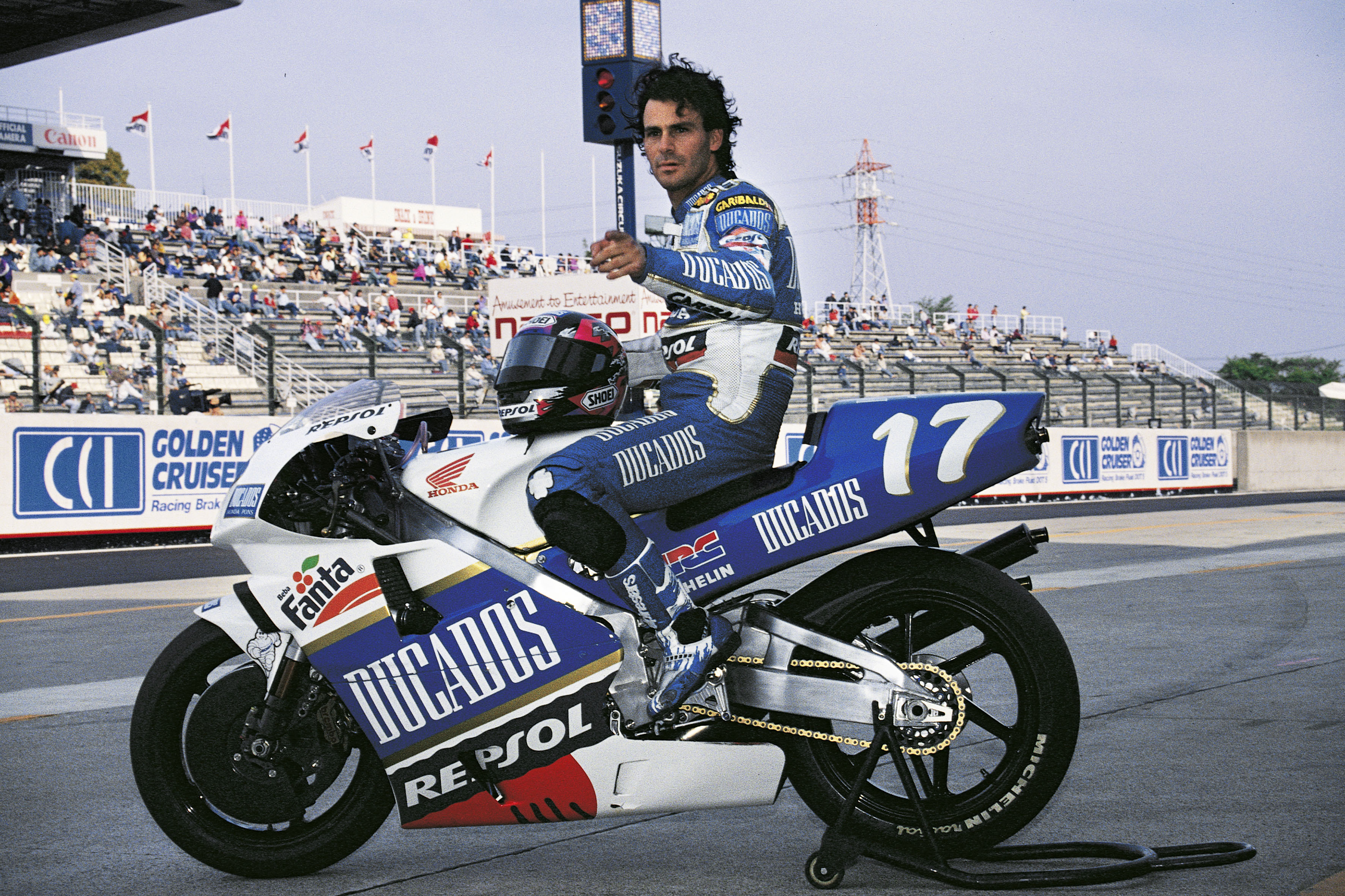
Puig, sitting on his Honda at the 1994 Japanese Grand Prix

Puig had his best year in 1994, when he finished in fifth place in the 500 cc class. In 1995, Puig became the first Spanish competitor to win his home nation's 500 cc Grand Prix when he won the 1995 Spanish Grand Prix. He then scored two more podium results to place himself in third place in the world championship, before he crashed heavily during practice for the 1995 French Grand Prix and broke his left leg, ending his season prematurely. He returned in 1996 but his injuries hindered his progress and he decided to retire at the end of the 1997 season at the age of 30.

== Team manager ==
Puig runs the Red Bull MotoGP Academy, designed to find and train promising Grand Prix racers and, he is credited with starting the careers of Casey Stoner, Dani Pedrosa and Toni Elías. Puig also acted as manager for Pedrosa. He was named as Repsol Honda's team principal for the 2018 season and has continued in that role through the 2025 season.

Despite having only ever won one race, Puig stirred controversy in the sport by diminishing the value of the 2020 season following Marc Márquez's crash in the opening round by stating, "But my opinion, and I know what I am talking about, is that when you win but the champion is not on the track you always have something left inside." "I will set my example: I won a race here in 1995, and I've always wondered if I would have won it if Mick Doohan hadn't fallen." Jack Miller responded that he had "heard two people say now two questions about the validity of the championship, and it's a complete crock".

== Motorcycle Grand Prix Results ==
Points system from 1969 to 1987:

**Position**	1	2	3	4	5	6	7	8	9	10
**Points**	15	12	10	8	6	5	4	3	2	1

Points system from 1988 to 1991:

**Position**	1	2	3	4	5	6	7	8	9	10	11	12	13	14	15
**Points**	20	17	15	13	11	10	9	8	7	6	5	4	3	2	1

Points system in 1992:

**Position**	1	2	3	4	5	6	7	8	9	10
**Points**	20	15	12	10	8	6	4	3	2	1

Points system from 1993:

**Position**	1	2	3	4	5	6	7	8	9	10	11	12	13	14	15
**Points**	25	20	16	13	11	10	9	8	7	6	5	4	3	2	1

(key) (Races in bold indicate pole position; races in italics indicate fastest lap)

Year	Class	Team	Machine	1	2	3	4	5	6	7	8	9	10	11	12	13	14	15	Points	Rank	Wins
1987	250cc	-	-	JPN -	ESP -	GER -	NAT -	AUT -	YUG -	NED; 20	FRA; 11	GBR -	SWE -	CZE -	RSM -	POR; 17	BRA; 20	ARG; 13	0	-	0
1988	250cc	Ducados Honda-Nieto	NSR250	JPN; 25	USA; NC	ESP; 14	EXP; 8	NAT; NC	GER; 17	AUT -	NED -	BEL -	YUG -	FRA -	GBR -	SWE; NC	CZE -	BRA; 21	10	30th	0
1989	250cc	Ducados Yamaha Puig	TZ250	JPN; NC	AUS; NC	USA; 12	ESP; NC	NAT; 16	GER; 23	AUT; 22	YUG; NC	NED; 7	BEL; 13	FRA; 14	GBR; 16	SWE; NC	CZE; 16	BRA; NC	18	23rd	0
1990	250cc	Ducados Yamaha Puig	TZ250	JPN -	USA -	ESP -	NAT -	GER -	AUT; NC	YUG; NC	NED; 10	BEL; 7	FRA; 9	GBR; 15	SWE; 12	CZE; 11	HUN -	AUS -	32	16th	0
1991	250cc	Ducados Yamaha Puig	TZ250M	JPN; 21	AUS; NC	USA; NC	ESP; 10	ITA; NC	GER -	AUT -	EUR -	NED; NC	FRA; 19	GBR; 10	RSM; 17	CZE; 14	VDM; 11	MAL; 7	28	16th	0
1992	250cc	Ducados DC Sports Aprilia	RSV250	JPN; 6	AUS; NC	MAL; 2	ESP; 7	ITA; 6	EUR; 8	GER; 6	NED; 4	HUN; 3	FRA; 6	GBR; NC	BRA; 8	RSA; NC			71	6th	0
1993	250cc	Ducados Honda-Pons	NSR250	AUS; 13	MAL; 8	JPN; 15	ESP; NC	AUT; 9	GER; 11	NED; 9	EUR; 3	RSM; 10	GBR; NC	CZE; 3	ITA; 5	USA; 4	FIM; 4		106	9th	0
1994	500cc	Ducados Honda-Pons	NSR500	AUS; 7	MAL; 5	JPN; 8	ESP; 6	AUT; 6	GER; 3	NED; 4	ITA; 4	FRA; 4	GBR; 7	CZE; 5	USA; 7	ARG; 5	EUR; 7		152	5th	0
1995	500cc	Fortuna Honda-Pons	NSR500	AUS; 7	MAL; 5	JPN; 5	ESP; 1	GER; 5	ITA; 3	NED; 3	FRA -	GBR -	CZE -	BRA -	ARG -	EUR -			99	8th	1
1996	500cc	Fortuna Honda-Pons	NSR500	MAL; 7	INA; 10	JPN; 9	ESP; 5	ITA; 12	FRA; 3	NED; 12	GER; 11	GBR; 11	AUT; 13	CZE; 12	IMO; 12	CAT; 7	BRA; 10	AUS -	93	11th	0
1997	500cc	MoviStar Honda-Pons	NSR500	MAL; 7	JPN; 8	ESP; NC	ITA; NC	AUT; 8	FRA; 8	NED; 5	IMO; 12	GER; 10	BRA; 14	GBR; NC	CZE; 13	CAT; 15	INA; 14	AUS; 15	63	12th	0
