= Martin Wimmer =

German motorcycle racer

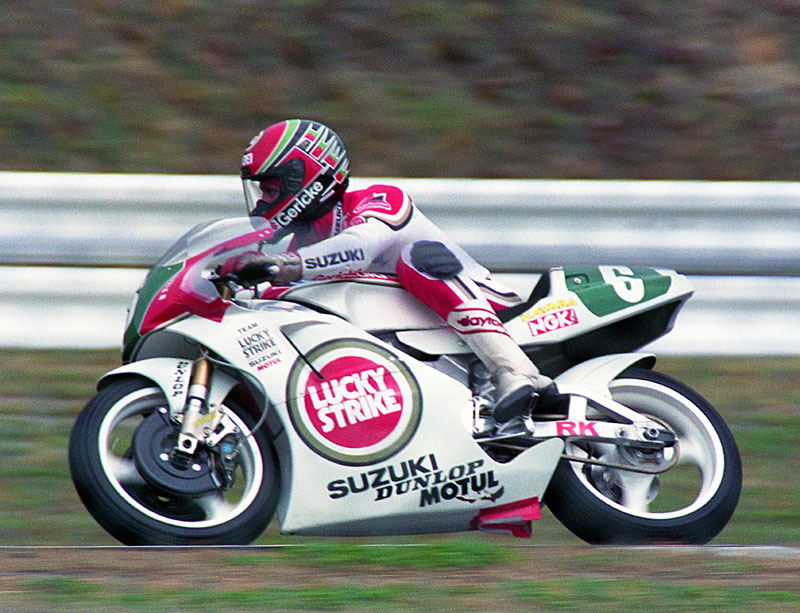
- Martin Wimmer during the 1991 Japanese Grand Prix
- Nationality: German
- Born: 11 October 1957 (age 69); Munich, West Germany
Motorcycle racing career statistics
Grand Prix motorcycle racing
Active years	1980 - 1991
First race	1980 250cc German Grand Prix
Last race	1991 250cc Malaysian Grand Prix
First win	1982 250cc British Grand Prix
Last win	1987 250cc Spanish Grand Prix
Team	Yamaha
Starts / Wins / Podiums / Poles / F. laps / Points; 133 / 3 / 16 / 8 / 8 / 693

Martin Wimmer (born 11 October 1957 in Munich) is a former Grand Prix motorcycle road racer from Germany. He had his best year in 1985, when he won the German Grand Prix, and had two second places, finishing the 250cc season in fourth place behind Freddie Spencer, Anton Mang and Carlos Lavado.

In 1987, Yamaha teamed Wimmer with Kevin Magee to win the Suzuka 8 Hours endurance race. In 2009, he joined Ralf Waldmann in buying out the motorbike manufacturing company MZ, from the Hong Leong Group.

Wimmer formed Motorenwerke Zschopau GmbH and ran it with the Investor Peter Ertel until September 2012, when he had to file for insolvency proceedings. His bank, Merkur Bank KGaA, had withdrawn a loan offer short term despite the company having a fixed term account. Currently, there are several legal court proceedings. Wimmer published a book about the case in November 2014. The name of the book is: Der Fall MZ ... durch die Bank weg ...

== Motorcycle Grand Prix Results ==
Points system from 1969 to 1987:

**Position**	1	2	3	4	5	6	7	8	9	10
**Points**	15	12	10	8	6	5	4	3	2	1

Points system from 1988 to 1992:

**Position**	1	2	3	4	5	6	7	8	9	10	11	12	13	14	15
**Points**	20	17	15	13	11	10	9	8	7	6	5	4	3	2	1

(key) (Races in bold indicate pole position; races in italics indicate fastest lap)

Year	Class	Team	1	2	3	4	5	6	7	8	9	10	11	12	13	14	15	Points	Rank	Wins
1980	250cc	Mitsui-Yamaha	NAT -	ESP -	FRA -	YUG -	NED -	BEL -	FIN -	GBR -	CZE -	GER; 9						2	30th	0
1981	250cc	Mitsui-Yamaha	ARG; 6		GER -	NAT; 4	FRA -	ESP; 8		NED; 8	BEL -	RSM -	GBR; 5	FIN; 10	SWE; 7	CZE; 8		33	8th	0
1981	350cc	Mitsui-Yamaha	ARG -	AUT -	GER -	NAT -			YUG; 10	NED; 9			GBR; 6			CZE; 8		11	12th	0
1982	250cc	Mitsui-Yamaha			FRA; 9	ESP -	NAT -	NED; 7	BEL; 7	YUG -	**GBR**; 1	SWE; 6	FIN -	CZE; 3	RSM; 4	GER -		48	4th	1
1982	350cc	Mitsui-Yamaha	ARG -	AUT -	FRA; 5		NAT; 5	NED -			GBR -		FIN -	CZE -		GER -		12	16th	0
1983	250cc	Mitsui-Yamaha	RSA; 8	FRA; NC	NAT; 4	GER; NC	ESP; 3	AUT; 5	YUG; NC	NED; 5	BEL; 6	GBR; 5	SWE; 10					45	6th	0
1984	250cc	Mitsui-Yamaha	RSA; 12	NAT; 2	ESP; 13	AUT; 7	GER; 2	FRA; 9	YUG; 8	NED; 23	BEL; 16	GBR; 5	SWE; NC	RSM; 4				47	7th	0
1985	250cc	Lui-Yamaha	RSA; 5	ESP; 2	GER; 1	**NAT**; NC	AUT; 4	YUG; 4	NED; 2	BEL; 4	FRA -	GBR -	SWE -	RSM -				69	4th	1
1986	250cc	Marlboro-Yamaha	**ESP**; 4	**NAT**; 4	GER; 3	AUT; 2	YUG; NC	NED; 5	BEL; 17	**FRA**; 6	GBR; 9	**SWE**; 12	RSM; 6					56	6th	0
1987	250cc	Marlboro-Yamaha	JPN; 5	ESP; 1	GER -	NAT -	AUT; 10	YUG; 5	NED; 5	FRA; 10	GBR; 3	SWE; NC	CZE; NC	RSM; 5	POR; 3	BRA; NC	**ARG**; NC	61	8th	1
1988	250cc	Hein Gericke-Yamaha	JPN -	USA; 17	ESP; 9	EXP; NC	NAT; NC	GER; 6	AUT; 12	NED; 9	BEL; NC	YUG -	FRA; 11	GBR; 15	SWE; 10	CZE; 18	BRA; NC	40	14th	0
1989	250cc	Hein Gericke-Aprilia	JPN; 21	AUS; 13	USA; NC	ESP; 8	NAT; 9	GER; NC	AUT; 3	YUG; NC	NED; 5	BEL; NC	FRA; 12	GBR; 11	SWE; 8	CZE -	BRA; 15	62	10th	0
1990	250cc	Hein Gericke-Aprilia	JPN -	USA; 10	ESP; 5	NAT; 6	GER; 9	AUT; 2	YUG; 3	NED; 8	BEL; NC	FRA; 6	GBR; 9	SWE; 7	CZE; 6	HUN; 8	AUS; NC	118	6th	0
1991	250cc	Lucky Strike-Suzuki	JPN; 14	AUS; NC	USA; 7	ESP; 8	ITA; 19	GER; 9	AUT; 13	EUR; 9	NED; 7	FRA; 10	GBR; 6	RSM; 9	CZE; 6	VDM; NC	MAL; 5	89	9th	0

=== Suzuka 8 Hours results ===
Year	Team	Co-riders	Bike	Pos.
1987	(Japan) SHISEIDO TECH 21 RT	(Australia) Kevin Magee	Yamaha YZF750	1st
