= Jacques Cornu =

Swiss motorcycle racer (1953–2026)

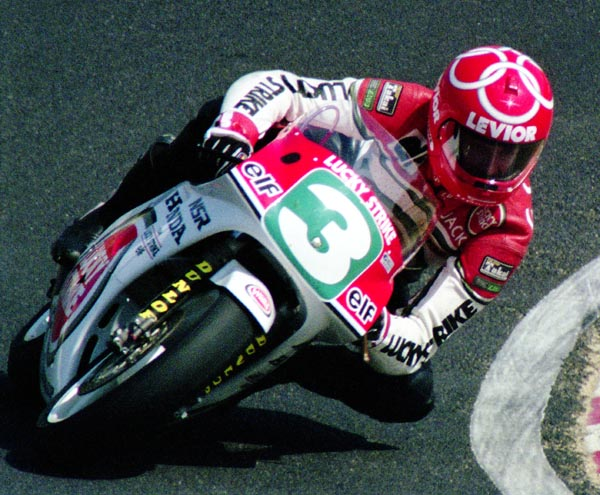
- Cornu at the 1990 Japanese Grand Prix.
- Nationality: Swiss
- Born: 15 May 1953; Aigle, Switzerland
- Died: 27 April 2026 (aged 72); Neuchâtel, Switzerland
Motorcycle racing career statistics
Grand Prix motorcycle racing
Active years	1980 - 1990
First race	1980 250cc Spanish Grand Prix
Last race	1990 250cc Australian Grand Prix
First win	1988 250cc Austrian Grand Prix
Last win	1989 250cc Belgian Grand Prix
Team	Honda
Starts / Wins / Podiums / Poles / F. laps / Points; 116 / 3 / 21 / 3 / 3 / 753

Jacques Cornu (15 May 1953 – 27 April 2026) was a Swiss Grand Prix motorcycle road racer. His best year was in 1988, when he won two races and finished in third place in the 250cc world championship. Cornu won three Grand Prix races during his career. In 1982, he teamed up with Jean Claude Chemarin to win the FIM Endurance World Championship.

Cornu died after a long illness in Neuchâtel, on 27 April 2026, at the age of 72.

== Motorcycle Grand Prix results ==
Points system from 1969 to 1987:

**Position**	1	2	3	4	5	6	7	8	9	10
**Points**	15	12	10	8	6	5	4	3	2	1

Points system from 1988 to 1992:

**Position**	1	2	3	4	5	6	7	8	9	10	11	12	13	14	15
**Points**	20	17	15	13	11	10	9	8	7	6	5	4	3	2	1

(key) (Races in bold indicate pole position; races in italics indicate fastest lap)

Year	Class	Team	1	2	3	4	5	6	7	8	9	10	11	12	13	14	15	Points	Rank	Wins
1980	250cc	Yamaha	NAT -	ESP; 6	FRA; 6	YUG; 5	NED -	BEL; 7	FIN -	GBR -	CZE -	GER; 5						26	8th	0
1980	350cc	Motul-Yamaha	NAT -		FRA; 8		NED; 6			GBR -	CZE; 4	GER; 6						21	7th	0
1981	350cc	Yamaha	ARG; 9	AUT; 7	GER -	NAT -	YUG; 4	NED -	GBR -	CZE; 5								20	8th	0
1982	250cc	Hostettler-Yamaha			FRA; 5	ESP -	NAT; 9	NED -	BEL -	YUG; 6	GBR -	SWE; 7	FIN -	CZE -	RSM -	GER -		17	17th	0
1982	350cc	Hostettler-Yamaha	ARG; 5	AUT; 5	FRA -		NAT; 9	NED -			GBR -		FIN -	CZE; 3		GER -		31	7th	0
1983	250cc	Hostettler-Yamaha	RSA; 5	FRA; 2	NAT; 5	**GER**; NC	ESP -	AUT; 9	YUG -	NED; 9	BEL; 7	GBR -	SWE; 17					32	9th	0
1984	250cc	Hostettler-Yamaha	RSA; 16	NAT; 6	ESP; 6	AUT; 8	GER; 8	FRA; NC	YUG; 3	NED; 2	BEL; 13	GBR; 9	SWE; 3	RSM; 3				60	6th	0
1985	250cc	Parisienne-Honda	RSA; 10	ESP; 11	GER; 19	NAT; 7	AUT; 13	YUG; 9	NED; 5	BEL; 11	FRA; 7	GBR; 9	SWE; 5	RSM; 16				25	10th	0
1986	250cc	Parisienne-Honda	ESP; 5	NAT; 6	GER; 7	AUT; 13	YUG; 14	NED; 11	BEL; 8	FRA; 3	GBR; NC	SWE; 7	RSM; NC					32	7th	0
1987	250cc	Parisienne-Honda	JPN; NC	ESP; 6	GER; 2	NAT; 4	AUT; 6	YUG; 4	NED; 7	FRA; NC	GBR; 4	SWE; NC	CZE -	RSM -	POR -	BRA -	ARG -	50	9th	0
1988	250cc	Parisienne-Honda	JPN; 4	USA; 7	ESP; 4	EXP; 3	NAT; 8	GER; 21	**AUT**; 1	NED; 2	**BEL**; 2	YUG; 6	FRA; 1	GBR; 7	SWE; NC	CZE; 7	BRA; 10	166	3rd	2
1989	250cc	Lucky Strike-Honda	JPN; 9	AUS; 6	USA; 6	ESP; NC	NAT; 3	GER; 5	AUT; 2	YUG; 3	NED; 3	BEL; 1	FRA; 2	GBR; 4	SWE; 3	CZE; 3	BRA; 9	187	3rd	1
1990	250cc	Lucky Strike-Honda	JPN; 5	USA -	ESP -	NAT -	GER -	AUT; 7	YUG; 8	NED; NC	BEL; 5	FRA; 5	GBR; 6	SWE; 6	CZE; 9	HUN; 7	AUS; NC	86	9th	0

=== FIM Endurance World Championship ===
Year	Bike	Rider	TC
1982	Kawasaki Heavy Industries	(France) Jean-Claude Chemarin (Switzerland) Jacques Cornu	1st
1983	Kawasaki	(Switzerland) Jacques Cornu	3rd

Preceded by Jean Lafond; Raymond Roche	Endurance FIM World Champion; 1982; With: Jean-Claude Chemarin	Succeeded by Richard Hubin; Hervé Moineau
