= Sito Pons =

Spanish motorcycle racer

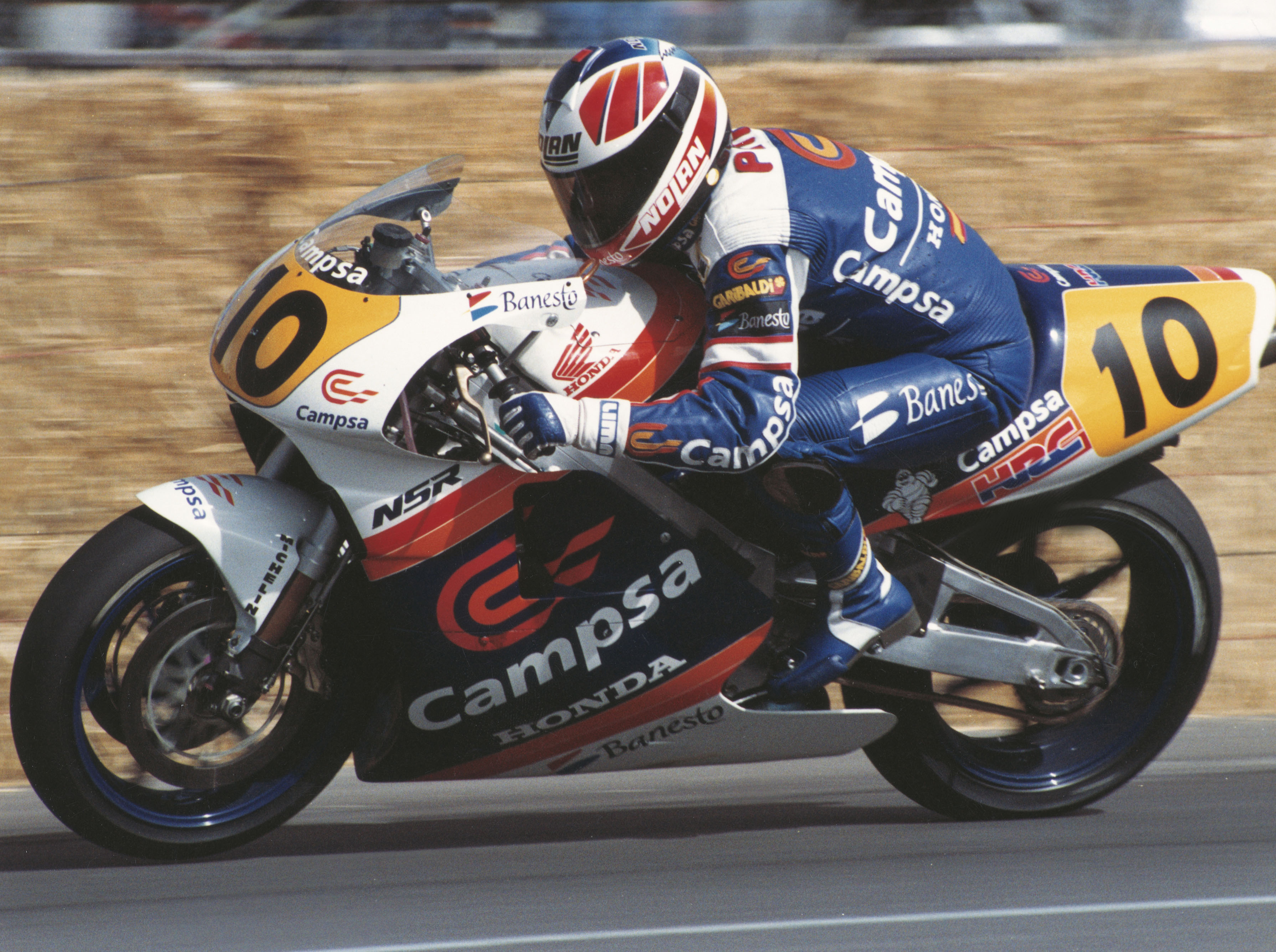
- Pons on a Honda at the 1991 United States Grand Prix
- Nationality: Spanish
- Born: Alfonso Pons Ezquerra; 9 November 1959 (age 67); Barcelona, Spain
Motorcycle racing career statistics
Grand Prix motorcycle racing
| Active years | 1980–1991 |
| First race | 1981 250cc Belgian Grand Prix |
| Last race | 1991 500cc Malaysian Grand Prix |
| First win | 1984 250cc Spanish Grand Prix |
| Last win | 1989 250cc Swedish Grand Prix |
| Team | Honda |
| Championships | 250cc – 1988, 1989 |
Starts / Wins / Podiums / Poles / F. laps / Points; 110 / 15 / 41 / 4 / 12 / 944

Alfonso "Sito" Pons Ezquerra (born 9 November 1959) is a Spanish former professional Grand Prix motorcycle racer. He studied Architecture at the university of Barcelona, He competed in the FIM motorcycle Grand Prix world championships from 1981 to 1991. Pons is notable for winning two consecutive 250cc road racing world championships in 1988 and 1989.

After retiring from competition, Pons created the Honda Pons Racing team in MotoGP, which was forced to disband before the 2006 season due to a lack of funding. The team was best known for its iconic West and Camel liveries.

Pons also turned to auto racing, fielding a team in the World Series by Renault, which was mostly based in United Kingdom. His team won the 2004 championship with Heikki Kovalainen. He then returned to motorcycle racing in the 2010 Moto2 championship, fielding Sergio Gadea and his son Axel.

In 1990, Pons was awarded the Prince of Asturias Award for his achievements in sports.

== Personal life ==
Pons is the father of three sons, Axel, Edgar and Lucas.

== Motorcycle Grand Prix results ==
Points system from 1969 to 1987:

| **Position** | 1 | 2 | 3 | 4 | 5 | 6 | 7 | 8 | 9 | 10 |
| **Points** | 15 | 12 | 10 | 8 | 6 | 5 | 4 | 3 | 2 | 1 |

Points system from 1988 to 1991:

| **Position** | 1 | 2 | 3 | 4 | 5 | 6 | 7 | 8 | 9 | 10 | 11 | 12 | 13 | 14 | 15 |
| **Points** | 20 | 17 | 15 | 13 | 11 | 10 | 9 | 8 | 7 | 6 | 5 | 4 | 3 | 2 | 1 |

(key) (Races in bold indicate pole position; races in italics indicate fastest lap)

| Year | Class | Team | 1 | 2 | 3 | 4 | 5 | 6 | 7 | 8 | 9 | 10 | 11 | 12 | 13 | 14 | 15 | Points | Rank | Wins |
|---|---|---|---|---|---|---|---|---|---|---|---|---|---|---|---|---|---|---|---|---|
| 1981 | 250cc | Siroko-Rotax | ARG - | GER - | NAT - | FRA - | ESP - | NED - | BEL; 7 | RSM - | GBR - | FIN - | SWE - | CZE - | | | | 4 | 28th | 0 |
| 1982 | 250cc | KOBAS-Rotax | FRA - | ESP - | NAT - | NED - | BEL - | YUG - | GBR - | SWE - | FIN; 3 | CZE; 4 | RSM - | GER - | | | | 18 | 15th | 0 |
| 1983 | 250cc | KOBAS-Rotax | RSA; 15 | FRA; 13 | NAT; NC | GER; 9 | ESP; 4 | AUT; NC | YUG - | NED - | BEL - | GBR - | SWE - | | | | | 10 | 18th | 0 |
| 1984 | 250cc | KOBAS | RSA; 3 | NAT; NC | ESP; 1 | AUT; 3 | GER; NC | FRA; NC | YUG; 5 | NED; 15 | BEL; 2 | GBR; 6 | SWE; 9 | RSM; 5 | | | | 66 | 4th | 1 |
| 1985 | 500cc | HB-Suzuki | RSA; 8 | ESP; 9 | GER; 9 | NAT; NC | AUT; NC | YUG; 11 | NED; NC | BEL; 15 | FRA; 7 | GBR; NC | SWE; NC | RSM; 11 | | | | 11 | 13th | 0 |
| 1986 | 250cc | Campsa-Honda | ESP; 3 | NAT; 5 | GER; NC | AUT; 5 | YUG; 1 | NED; 3 | BEL; 1 | FRA; 2 | GBR; 3 | SWE; 2 | RSM; 2 | | | | | 108 | **2nd** | 2 |
| 1987 | 250cc | Campsa-Honda | JPN; 2 | ESP; 9 | GER; 7 | NAT; 5 | AUT; 4 | YUG; 8 | NED; 3 | FRA; 4 | GBR; 7 | SWE; NC | CZE; 4 | RSM; 3 | POR; 5 | BRA; 2 | ARG; 1 | 108 | **3rd** | 1 |
| 1988 | 250cc | Campsa-Honda | JPN; 2 | USA; 2 | ESP; 1 | EXP; NC | NAT; 2 | GER; 2 | AUT; 5 | NED; 6 | BEL; 1 | **YUG**; 1 | FRA; 2 | GBR; 4 | SWE; 1 | CZE; 2 | BRA; 3 | 231 | **1st** | 4 |
| 1989 | 250cc | Campsa-Honda | JPN; 2 | AUS; 1 | USA; 4 | ESP; 2 | NAT; 1 | GER; 1 | **AUT**; 1 | **YUG**; 1 | **NED**; 2 | BEL; 2 | FRA; 3 | GBR; 1 | SWE; 1 | CZE; 4 | BRA; 4 | 262 | **1st** | 7 |
| 1990 | 500cc | Campsa-Honda | JPN; 5 | USA; NC | ESP; 6 | NAT; 6 | GER; 5 | AUT; 6 | YUG; NC | NED - | BEL - | FRA - | GBR - | SWE - | CZE; 7 | HUN; 10 | AUS; 7 | 76 | 10th | 0 |
| 1991 | 500cc | Campsa-Honda | JPN; 8 | AUS; NC | USA; NC | ESP - | ITA - | GER - | AUT - | EUR; 11 | NED; 10 | FRA; 9 | GBR; NC | RSM; NC | CZE; 9 | VDM; 9 | MAL; NC | 40 | 14th | 0 |

== See also ==
- Sito Pons 500cc Grand Prix
