= Marco Papa =

Italian motorcycle racer

- Nationality: Italian
Motorcycle racing career statistics
Grand Prix motorcycle racing
Active years	1980, 1983 – 1996
First race	1980 250 cc Nations Grand Prix
Last race	1996 500 cc Imola Grand Prix
Team(s)	Paton, Cagiva
Starts / Wins / Podiums / Poles / F. laps / Points; 104 / 0 / 0 / 0 / 0 / 110

Marco Papa (16 March 1958 in Perugia, Umbria, Italy, – 9 September 1999 near Adro Italy) was a Grand Prix motorcycle road racer. His most successful year was in 1990 when he finished in 13th place in the 500cc world championship aboard a Moto Club Perugia sponsored Honda NS500. Papa perished in a road accident in September 1999. A turn was dedicated to him at Magione circuit near Perugia.

== Career statistics ==
=== Grand Prix motorcycle racing ===
==== Races by year ====
(key) (Races in bold indicate pole position) (Races in italics indicate fastest lap)

Year	Class	Bike	1	2	3	4	5	6	7	8	9	10	11	12	13	14	15	Pos.	Pts
1980	250cc	Yamaha	NAT; 10	SPA	FRA; DNQ	YUG	NED	BEL; 25	FIN	GBR	CZE	GER						32nd	1
1981	500cc	Suzuki	AUT	GER	NAT; 20	FRA	YUG	NED	BEL	RSM	GBR	FIN	SWE					NC	0
1982	500cc	Suzuki	ARG	AUT; Ret	FRA; 16	SPA; Ret	NAT	NED	BEL	YUG	GBR; Ret	SWE	RSM; Ret	GER				NC	0
1983	500cc	Suzuki	RSA	FRA	NAT; 16	GER	SPA	AUT	YUG	NED	BEL	GBR	SWE	RSM				NC	0
1984	500cc	Honda	RSA	NAT; 20	SPA; 17	AUT; 19	GER; 29	FRA	YUG	NED	BEL	GBR	SWE	RSM; Ret				NC	0
1985	500cc	Suzuki	RSA	SPA	GER; 26	NAT; 20	AUT	YUG; 19	NED; 18	BEL; 25	FRA							NC	0
1985	500cc	Paton										GBR; DNQ	SWE	RSM; 19				NC	0
1986	500cc	Honda	SPA	NAT; 10	GER	AUT	YUG; 16	NED; 18	BEL	FRA	GBR	SWE; DNS	RSM					24th	1
1987	500cc	Honda	JPN	SPA	GER; 18	NAT; 16	AUT	YUG	NED; DNS	FRA	GBR	SWE	CZE	RSM; 17	POR	BRA	ARG	NC	0
1988	500cc	Honda	JPN	USA	SPA; Ret	EXP; 9	NAT; 24	GER; 14	AUT; Ret	NED; 14	BEL; 14	YUG; Ret	FRA; 18	GBR; DNS	SWE	CZE; 12	BRA	17th	17
1989	500cc	Paton	JPN	AUS	USA	SPA; Ret	NAT; Ret	GER; DNQ	AUT	YUG; 17	NED; 20	BEL; 18	FRA; Ret	GBR; 16	SWE	CZE; Ret	BRA	NC	0
1990	500cc	Honda	JPN	USA	SPA	NAT; 9	GER; 11	AUT; 13	YUG; 6	NED; 14	BEL; DSQ	FRA; 9	GBR; 13	SWE; 11	CZE; 13	HUN; 12	AUS; 10	14th	55
1991	500cc	Honda	JPN	AUS	USA	SPA; 12	ITA; 11	GER				FRA; 13						16th	36
1991	500cc	Cagiva							AUT; 12	EUR; Ret	NED		GBR; 10	RSM; 12	CZE	VDM; 13	MAL; 9	16th	36
1992	500cc	Librenti	JPN; DNQ	AUS; Ret	MAL; Ret	SPA; 24	ITA; Ret	EUR; 22	GER; Ret	NED; 18	HUN	FRA; 18	GBR; 16					NC	0
1992	500cc	Cagiva												BRA; 17	RSA; 16			NC	0
1993	500cc	Librenti	AUS; Ret	MAL; Ret	JPN; Ret	SPA; Ret	AUT; 25	GER; DNQ	NED; Ret	EUR; Ret				ITA; Ret	USA; Ret	FIM		NC	0
1993	500cc	ROC Yamaha									RSM; Ret	GBR						NC	0
1993	500cc	Harris Yamaha											CZE; 21					NC	0
1994	500cc	ROC Yamaha	AUS; Ret	MAL; Ret	JPN	SPA; Ret	AUT; Ret	GER; Ret	NED	ITA	FRA	GBR	CZE; 19	USA; Ret	ARG; Ret	EUR; Ret		NC	0
1995	500cc	Librenti	AUS	MAL	JPN	SPA	GER	ITA; DNQ	NED									NC	0
1995	500cc	ROC Yamaha								FRA; Ret	GBR; Ret	CZE; 23	BRA; Ret	ARG; Ret	EUR; Ret			NC	0
1996	500cc	ROC Yamaha	MAL	INA	JPN	SPA	ITA; 19	FRA	NED	GER	GBR	AUT	CZE					NC	0
1996	500cc	Paton												IMO; 18	CAT	BRA	AUS	NC	0

=== Superbike World Championship ===
==== Races by year ====
(key) (Races in bold indicate pole position) (Races in italics indicate fastest lap)

Year	Make	1		2		3		4		5		6		7		8		9		10		11		12		13		Pos.	Pts
Year	Make	R1	R2	R1	R2	R1	R2	R1	R2	R1	R2	R1	R2	R1	R2	R1	R2	R1	R2	R1	R2	R1	R2	R1	R2	R1	R2	Pos.	Pts
1990	Yamaha	SPA; 24	SPA; 17	GBR	GBR	HUN	HUN	GER	GER	CAN	CAN	USA	USA	AUT	AUT	JPN	JPN	FRA	FRA	ITA	ITA	MAL	MAL	AUS	AUS	NZL	NZL	NC	0
