= United States motorcycle Grand Prix =

United States Grand Prix

Grand Prix motorcycle racing
- Venue: Circuit of the Americas (2026–present); Laguna Seca (1988–1991, 1993–1994, 2005–2013); Daytona International Speedway (1964–1965)
- First race: 1964
- Most wins (rider): Hugh Anderson, John Kocinski, Wayne Rainey, Casey Stoner (3)
- Most wins (manufacturer): Honda (13)

The United States motorcycle Grand Prix is a round of the FIM Grand Prix motorcycle racing World Championship.

== History ==
The first United States Grand Prix was held in 1961 as a non-championship race at the Daytona International Speedway on the 2-mile or 3.2 kilometre long motorcycle course. In 1964, the FIM upgraded the Daytona race to world championship status by making it the opening round of the 1964 Grand Prix motorcycle racing season. A feud between the FIM and the American Motorcyclist Association (AMA) meant that AMA competitors such as Gary Nixon, Dick Mann and Roger Reiman were prevented from entering the FIM sanctioned event. This marked the first time that Grand Prix motorcycle racing raced on the North American continent. Spectator attendance for this race was low as there was little interest from the American public, who preferred the championship organized by the AMA and as a result was not interested in the "European" style of racing. In 1965 the U.S. Grand Prix returned for the second time at Daytona, but privateers were unable to pay for the trip to the United States and few Americans went to see the race due to the lack of interest in the majority European-styled championship. As a result of the lack of interest from the American public, top teams and riders, the United States Grand Prix was removed from the 1966 season.

After a 23-year absence, the U.S. Grand Prix returned for the 1988 on the Laguna Seca Raceway. That year's event was marred with problems as many especially European riders complained about the bumpyness of an old part of the track and the dangerously close barriers and concrete blocs that surrounded the circuit. Some European riders even considered to not participate in the race on Sunday while the American riders had no problems with the circuit as they had more experience. The 1989 didn't fare much better as the organization was once again poor - there were problems with the prize- and start money, tickets and timekeeping. Against the rules some sold tickets in front of the riders' quarter's, the prize money was unusual, the supply roads were insufficient and kept getting altered and the timekeeping produced useful times only after 18 hours. On top of that, the American organizers wanted to include a sidecar race in their program but refused to pay the extra travel expenses. While last year's bumpy section had been reprofiled for 1989, riders still complained it was dangerous - especially Turns 11, 1 and 2. During the race, an ambulance drove on the track in dangerous manner to assist the crashed out Wayne Gardner who had broken his leg after a heavy shunt exiting Turn 5, with no yellow flags being shown to the riders.

A bizarre incident occurred on the cooldown lap of the 1989 Grand Prix, when Bubba Shobert hit the back of Kevin Magee's motorcycle at high speed after he failed to see the Australian. Magee had stopped in the middle of the track behind a blind hill after he ran out of fuel to do a rear-wheel burnout, but Shobert was not looking forward as he was congratulating Eddie Lawson, who himself narrowly missed Magee. As Shobert lay motionless in the sand, a visibly distraught Lawson tried to help him. Shobert was brought to the hospital with severe head injuries and Magee was also recovered with a broken ankle and lower leg. Shobert would never race again after this incident while Magee was forced to miss both the Spanish and Italian rounds that year.

In 1990 the track of the U.S. Grand Prix had undergone various upgrades but riders still complained some points were dangerous. On lap two, Magee suffered a heavy accident whilst being in the top positions, his second in two years at this circuit. The race had to be red flagged to allow an ambulance to enter the circuit, where the Australian was taken to the hospital with severe head trauma. There he was operated and a blood clot in his brain was surgically removed, after which he was kept in an artificial coma for some time. The accident meant he was out of the 1990 season. In 1992 the United States Grand Prix was taken off the calendar in favour of other venues preferred by Bernie Ecclestone, who was increasingly involved in Grand Prix motorcycle racing at the time. For the 1993 however the event returned for two more years as Ecclestone focused more on Formula 1 again. In 1995 the race was scheduled to be held on August 6, but was eventually scrapped due to financial problems and complaints from riders about the dangerous circuit.

After a ten year hiatus, the event was brought back for the third time in 2005 on the same circuit as before - Laguna Seca. The track had undergone the needed updates and safety requirements and was now considered to be safe enough to host a U.S. Grand Prix again. Due to a California law on air pollution, only the four-stroke MotoGP motorcycles were allowed to participate. The race was won by home hero Nicky Hayden. In 2006 Hayden once again won his home race. The 2008 United States Grand Prix saw a thrilling battle between Valentino Rossi and Casey Stoner, the race being won by the Italian in the end. In 2014, the United States could only support two events (the Indianapolis Grand Prix and Motorcycle Grand Prix of the Americas were also scheduled at this time) and the organizers, as a not-for-profit, could no longer compete with either circuits. As a result, they couldn't keep up with Dorna's ever increasing financial demands and Laguna Seca was taken off the calendar despite having a contract for that year.

During the last existence of the U.S. Grand Prix, two other races co-existed with each other for one season in 2013 – the Indianapolis Grand Prix and the Grand Prix of the Americas. The Indy Grand Prix existed from 2008 until 2015, while the Grand Prix of the Americas was held continuously from 2013 to 2025, only being cancelled in 2020 after the outbreak of the COVID-19 pandemic. In 2026, MotoGP quietly changed the name of the Grand Prix of the Americas held in Circuit of the Americas in Austin, Texas, to the United States Grand Prix.

== Official names and sponsors ==
- 1965: Grand Prix of United States (no official sponsor)
- 1988: The United States International Grand Prix (no official sponsor)
- 1989: The Dunlop USGP
- 1990: The U.S. Budweiser International Grand Prix
- 1991: The Honda And Yamaha Motorcycles United States International Grand Prix
- 1993: USGP (no official sponsor)
- 1994: United States Motorcycle Grand Prix (no official sponsor)
- 2005–2013: Red Bull U.S. Grand Prix
- 2026: Red Bull Grand Prix of the United States

== Spectator attendance ==
2005: 57,932

== Winners ==
=== Multiple winners (riders) ===
# Wins	Rider	Wins	
# Wins	Rider	Category	Years won
3	(New Zealand) Hugh Anderson	125cc	1964, 1965
3	(New Zealand) Hugh Anderson	50cc	1964
3	(United States) Wayne Rainey	500cc	1989, 1990, 1991
3	(United States) John Kocinski	500cc	1993
3	(United States) John Kocinski	250cc	1989, 1990
3	(Australia) Casey Stoner	MotoGP	2007, 2011, 2012
2	(United Kingdom) Mike Hailwood	500cc	1964, 1965
2	(Italy) Luca Cadalora	500cc	1994
2	(Italy) Luca Cadalora	250cc	1991
2	(United States) Nicky Hayden	MotoGP	2005, 2006

=== Multiple winners (manufacturers) ===
# Wins	Manufacturer	Wins	
# Wins	Manufacturer	Category	Years won
13	(Japan) Honda	MotoGP	2005, 2006, 2009, 2011, 2012, 2013
13	(Japan) Honda	250cc	1988, 1991, 1993, 1994
13	(Japan) Honda	Moto3	2026
13	(Japan) Honda	125cc	1993, 1994
10	(Japan) Yamaha	MotoGP	2008, 2010
10	(Japan) Yamaha	500cc	1988, 1989, 1990, 1991, 1994
10	(Japan) Yamaha	250cc	1965, 1989, 1990
4	(Japan) Suzuki	125cc	1964, 1965
4	(Japan) Suzuki	50cc	1964, 1965
2	(Italy) MV Agusta	500cc	1964, 1965

=== By year ===
A pink background indicates an event that was not part of the Grand Prix motorcycle racing championship.

Year	Track	Moto3		Moto2		MotoGP		Report
Year	Track	Rider	Manufacturer	Rider	Manufacturer	Rider	Manufacturer	Report
2026	COTA	(Italy) Guido Pini	Honda	(Australia) Senna Agius	Kalex	(Italy) Marco Bezzecchi	Aprilia	Report
2013	Laguna Seca					(Spain) Marc Márquez	Honda	Report
2012	Laguna Seca					(Australia) Casey Stoner	Honda	Report
Year	Track	125cc		Moto2		MotoGP		Report
Year	Track	Rider	Manufacturer	Rider	Manufacturer	Rider	Manufacturer	Report
2011	Laguna Seca					(Australia) Casey Stoner	Honda	Report
2010	Laguna Seca					(Spain) Jorge Lorenzo	Yamaha	Report
Year	Track	125cc		250cc		MotoGP		Report
Year	Track	Rider	Manufacturer	Rider	Manufacturer	Rider	Manufacturer	Report
2009	Laguna Seca					(Spain) Dani Pedrosa	Honda	Report
2008	Laguna Seca					(Italy) Valentino Rossi	Yamaha	Report
2007	Laguna Seca					(Australia) Casey Stoner	Ducati	Report
2006	Laguna Seca					(United States) Nicky Hayden	Honda	Report
2005	Laguna Seca					(United States) Nicky Hayden	Honda	Report
Year	Track	125cc		250cc		500cc		Report
Year	Track	Rider	Manufacturer	Rider	Manufacturer	Rider	Manufacturer	Report
1994	Laguna Seca	(Japan) Takeshi Tsujimura	Honda	(Italy) Doriano Romboni	Honda	(Italy) Luca Cadalora	Yamaha	Report
1993	Laguna Seca	(Germany) Dirk Raudies	Honda	(Italy) Loris Capirossi	Honda	(United States) John Kocinski	Cagiva	Report
1991	Laguna Seca			(Italy) Luca Cadalora	Honda	(United States) Wayne Rainey	Yamaha	Report
1990	Laguna Seca			(United States) John Kocinski	Yamaha	(United States) Wayne Rainey	Yamaha	Report

Year	Track	80cc		125cc		250cc		500cc		Report
Year	Track	Rider	Manufacturer	Rider	Manufacturer	Rider	Manufacturer	Rider	Manufacturer	Report
1989	Laguna Seca					(United States) John Kocinski	Yamaha	(United States) Wayne Rainey	Yamaha	Report
1988	Laguna Seca					(United States) Jim Filice	Honda	(United States) Eddie Lawson	Yamaha	Report

Year	Track	50cc		125cc		250cc		350cc		500cc		Report
Year	Track	Rider	Manufacturer	Rider	Manufacturer	Rider	Manufacturer	Rider	Manufacturer	Rider	Manufacturer	Report
1965	Daytona	(East Germany) Ernst Degner	Suzuki	(New Zealand) Hugh Anderson	Suzuki	(United Kingdom) Phil Read	Yamaha			(United Kingdom) Mike Hailwood	MV Agusta	Report
1964	Daytona	(New Zealand) Hugh Anderson	Suzuki	(New Zealand) Hugh Anderson	Suzuki	(United Kingdom) Alan Shepherd	MZ			(United Kingdom) Mike Hailwood	MV Agusta	Report
1963	Daytona	(Japan) Mitsuo Itoh	Suzuki	(East Germany) Ernst Degner	Suzuki	(Japan) Fumio Ito	Yamaha			(United States) Don Vesco	Yamaha	Report
1962	Daytona	(Japan) Kunimitsu Takahashi	Honda	(Japan) Kunimitsu Takahashi	Honda	(United States) Jess Thomas	Motobi			(Japan) Kunimitsu Takahashi	Honda	Report
Year	Track			125cc		250cc		350cc		500cc		Report
Year	Track			Rider	Manufacturer	Rider	Manufacturer	Rider	Manufacturer	Rider	Manufacturer	Report
1961	Daytona					(Japan) Moto Kitano	Honda			(United Kingdom) Tony Godfrey	Matchless	Report
