= Christian Sarron =

French motorcycle racer

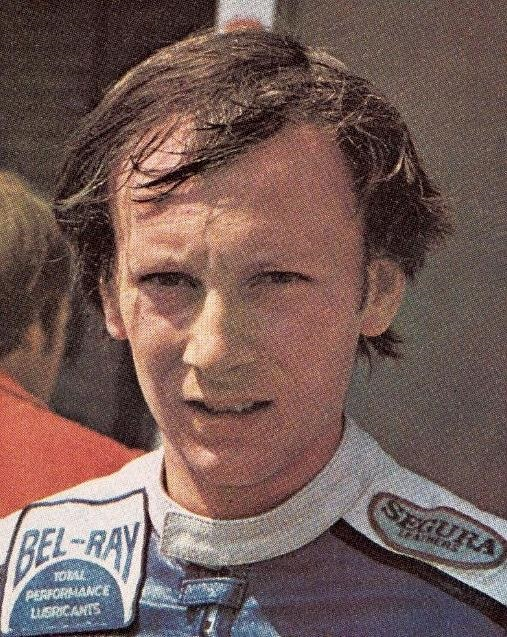
- Christian Sarron (1978).
- Nationality: French
- Born: 27 March 1955 (age 71); Clermont-Ferrand, France
Motorcycle racing career statistics
Grand Prix motorcycle racing
Active years	1976 - 1990
First race	1976 350cc German Grand Prix
Last race	1990 500cc Australian Grand Prix
First win	1977 250cc German Grand Prix
Last win	1985 500cc German Grand Prix
Team	Yamaha
Championships	250cc - 1984
Starts / Wins / Podiums / Poles / F. laps / Points; 148 / 7 / 37 / 11 / 10 / 933.5

Christian Sarron (born 27 March 1955 in Clermont-Ferrand, France) is a French former Grand Prix motorcycle road racer.

== Motorcycle racing career ==
Sarron began his career on a Kawasaki when he met French Grand Prix racer Patrick Pons. Pons helped him get his start in the international racing circuit. His first victory came in the rain in the 1977 German Grand Prix. He was injured in a 750cc race which would begin a trend of numerous injuries for the next few years. In 1982, he again won in the rain at the Finnish Grand Prix, cementing his reputation as an exceptional wet weather rider. He finished the 1982 season 8th in the 350 class and 10th in the 250 class.

Sarron would finish second to Carlos Lavado in the 1983 250 class with another Grand Prix victory in the Swedish Grand Prix. In 1984, he won three times on a Yamaha and captured the 250 World Championship.

The following year saw Sarron move up to the premiere 500cc division with the Gauloises-Yamaha team where he won again in the rain at the 1985 German Grand Prix. He finished the season in an impressive third place to Freddie Spencer and Eddie Lawson. In 1989, he again finished third in the 500cc championship behind Lawson and Wayne Rainey.

Sarron's 500cc career occurred at a time when the bikes suited the sliding style of the Americans who had been brought up on dirt oval tracks, yet Sarron still managed to post respectable results. In 1994, he teamed up with his brother Dominique Sarron to win the prestigious Bol d'or endurance race. In 1995, he retired from competition to take on the role of team director for Yamaha's Superbike team.

== Grand Prix career statistics ==
Points system from 1969 to 1987:

Position	1	2	3	4	5	6	7	8	9	10
Points	15	12	10	8	6	5	4	3	2	1

Points system from 1988 to 1992:

Position	1	2	3	4	5	6	7	8	9	10	11	12	13	14	15
Points	20	17	15	13	11	10	9	8	7	6	5	4	3	2	1

(key) (Races in bold indicate pole position; races in italics indicate fastest lap)

Year	Class	Team	Machine	1	2	3	4	5	6	7	8	9	10	11	12	13	14	15	Points	Rank	Wins
1976	350cc	Sonauto-Yamaha	TZ350	FRA	AUT	NAT	IOM	NED	FIN	CZE; 10	GER; 7	ESP							5	26th	0
1977	250cc	Sonauto-Yamaha	TZ250	VEN	GER; 1	NAT	ESP; 4	FRA	YUG	NED	BEL	SWE; 14	FIN	CZE	GBR				23	14th	1
1977	350cc	Sonauto-Yamaha	TZ350	VEN	GER; 8	NAT	ESP; 2	FRA	YUG	NED		SWE; 10	FIN; 2	CZE; 3	GBR				38	7th	0
1978	350cc	Sonauto-Yamaha	TZ350	VEN; 6	AUT	FRA	NAT	NED; 5	SWE	FIN	GBR; 7	GER	CZE	YUG					15	15th	0
1979	500cc	Sonauto-Yamaha	TZ500	VEN; 7	AUT	GER; 8	NAT; Ret	ESP	YUG; 7	NED; 9	BEL; Ret	SWE; 9	FIN; 5	GBR; 6	FRA				26	11th	0
1981	500cc	Sonauto-Yamaha	TZ500	AUT; Ret	GER	NAT; 9	FRA; Ret	YUG	NED	BEL	RSM; 12	GBR; 18	FIN	SWE					2	23rd	0
1982	250cc	Sonauto-Yamaha	TZ250			FRA	ESP; 9	NAT; 8	NED	BEL	YUG; 5	GBR	SWE	FIN; 1	CZE	RSM	GER		26	10th	1
1982	350cc	Sonauto-Yamaha	TZ350	ARG	AUT	FRA		NAT	NED; 5			GBR; 5		FIN; 2	CZE; 7		GER		28	8th	0
1983	250cc	Sonauto-Yamaha	TZ250	RSA; Ret	**FRA**; Ret	NAT; Ret	GER; 7	ESP; 2	AUT; 4	YUG; 2	NED; Ret	BEL; 2	GBR; 3	SWE; 1					73	2nd	1
1984	250cc	Sonauto-Yamaha	TZ250	RSA; 2	NAT; Ret	ESP; 2	**AUT**; 1	**GER**; 1	**FRA**; 5	YUG; 2	NED; Ret	BEL; 3	GBR; 1	SWE; 2	RSM; Ret				109	1st	3
1985	500cc	Sonauto-Yamaha	YZR500	RSA; 6	ESP; 3	GER; 1	NAT; 5	AUT; 3	YUG; 5	NED; Ret	BEL; 3	FRA; Ret	GBR; 3	SWE; 4	RSM; Ret				80	3rd	1
1986	500cc	Sonauto-Yamaha	YZR500	ESP; 5	NAT; 4	GER; Ret	AUT; 4	YUG; 6	NED; 5	BEL; 3	FRA; 3	GBR; Ret	SWE	RSM; 6					58	6th	0
1987	500cc	Sonauto-Yamaha	YZR500	JPN; Ret	ESP; Ret	GER; Ret	NAT; 3	AUT; 6	YUG	NED; Ret	**FRA**; 3	GBR; 4	SWE; Ret	CZE; 7	RSM; 8	POR; 5	BRA; 5	ARG; Ret	52	7th	0
1988	500cc	Sonauto-Yamaha	YZR500	JPN; 8	USA; 6	ESP; 4	EXP; 4	NAT; Ret	GER; 3	**AUT**; Ret	**NED**; 3	**BEL**; Ret	**YUG**; 2	**FRA**; 2	GBR; 3	SWE; 3	CZE; Ret	BRA; 5	149	4th	0
1989	500cc	Sonauto-Yamaha	YZR500	JPN; 7	AUS; 3	USA; 6	ESP; 4	NAT; DNS	GER; 5	AUT; 4	YUG; 5	NED; 3	BEL; 4	FRA; 4	GBR; 5	SWE; 2	CZE; 4	BRA; 8	165.5	3rd	0
1990	500cc	Sonauto-Yamaha	YZR500	JPN; Ret	USA; 4	ESP; 7	NAT	GER; 4	AUT; 7	YUG	NED; 7	BEL; 4	FRA; Ret	GBR; 8	SWE	CZE; 6	HUN; Ret	AUS; Ret	84	9th	0
