= 1988 Grand Prix motorcycle racing season =

Sports season

The 1988 Grand Prix motorcycle racing season was the 40th F.I.M. Road Racing World Championship season.

== Season summary ==
Eddie Lawson would recapture the championship from Wayne Gardner in a season that witnessed several fierce duels. Two newcomers joined the Grand Prix circuit with Americans Wayne Rainey and Kevin Schwantz each winning races in their first full year. This was Rainey’s debut in the 500s; he had ridden a 250 in 1984 and gotten 1 podium of 12 starts. Alan Cathcart’s pre-season assessment in Cycle News was that “Rainey is a good rider, but he’ll never be a great rider. And he’ll certainly never be a Randy Mamola.”

The V4 machines used by the factories were extremely powerful and in combination with rigid chassis produced power slides that sometimes caused violent highsides, throwing the riders into the air. Cagiva joined the racing with Randy Mamola as their rider. The first United States Grand Prix in 23 years was held in Monterrey, California.

Sito Pons beat out fellow countryman Juan Garriga for the 250 title winning four races to Garriga's three. Spain's Jorge Martinez captured double championships in the 80 and 125 classes for the Spanish firm Derbi.

== 1988 Grand Prix season calendar ==
The following Grands Prix were scheduled to take place in 1988:

Round	Date	Grand Prix	Circuit
1	27 March	Grand Prix of Japan	Suzuka Circuit
2	10 April	United States International Grand Prix	Laguna Seca Raceway
3	24 April	(Spain) Gran Premio Marlboro de España	Circuito Permanente Del Jarama
4	1 May	(Andalusia) Gran Premio Campsa	Circuito Permanente de Jerez
5	22 May	(Italy) Nations Grand Prix	Autodromo Enzo e Dino Ferrari
6	29 May	(Germany) Grosser Preis von Deutschland	Nürburgring
7	12 June	(Austria) Großer Preis von Österreich	Salzburgring
8	25 June	(Netherlands) Dutch-TT	TT Circuit Assen
9	3 July	G.P. of Belgium Gauloises Blondes	Circuit de Spa-Francorchamps
10	17 July	(Socialist Federal Republic of Yugoslavia) Yu Grand Prix	Automotodrom Rijeka
11	24 July	Grand Prix de France	Circuit Paul Ricard
12	7 August	(United Kingdom) Shell Oils British Motorcycle Grand Prix	Donington Park
13	14 August	(Sweden) Swedish TT	Scandinavian Raceway
14	28 August	(Czechoslovakia) Grand Prix CSSR-Brno	Brno Circuit
15	17 September	(Brazil) Brazilian Grand Prix	Autódromo Internacional Ayrton Senna

=== Calendar changes ===
- The United States Grand Prix was added to the calendar after a 23-year absence.
- The Spanish Grand Prix moved from the Jerez to the Jarama circuit.
- The Expo 92 Grand Prix was added as a one-off race to replace the Portuguese Grand Prix which was held in Spain at the Jarama circuit. The venue hosting the Grand Prix was the Jerez circuit.
- The Nations Grand Prix moved from the Monza to the Imola circuit.
- The German Grand Prix moved from the Hockenheimring to the Nürburgring.
- The German Grand Prix was moved back, from 17 to 29 May.
- The Belgian Grand Prix returned after a one-year absence.
- The French Grand Prix moved from the Bugatti Circuit in Le Mans to the Paul Ricard circuit.
- The San Marino Grand Prix was taken off the calendar.
- The Argentine Grand Prix was removed from the calendar because of bad organisation and unsafe track conditions.

== Results and standings ==
=== Grands Prix ===
Round	Date	Race	Location	80cc winner	125cc winner	250cc winner	500cc winner	Report
1	27 March	(Japan) Japanese Grand Prix	Suzuka	No race held	No race held	(Germany) Anton Mang	(United States) Kevin Schwantz	Report
2	10 April	United States Grand Prix	Laguna Seca	No race held	No race held	(United States) Jim Filice	(United States) Eddie Lawson	Report
3	24 April	(Spain) Spanish Grand Prix	Jarama	(Switzerland) Stefan Dörflinger	(Spain) Jorge Martínez	(Spain) Sito Pons	(Australia) Kevin Magee	Report
4	1 May	(Andalusia) Expo 92 Grand Prix	Jerez	(Spain) Jorge Martínez	No race held	(Spain) Juan Garriga	(United States) Eddie Lawson	Report
5	22 May	(Italy) Italian Grand Prix	Imola	(Spain) Jorge Martínez	(Spain) Jorge Martínez	(France) Dominique Sarron	(United States) Eddie Lawson	Report
6	29 May	(Germany) German Grand Prix	Nürburgring	(Spain) Jorge Martínez	(Italy) Ezio Gianola	(Italy) Luca Cadalora	(United States) Kevin Schwantz	Report
7	12 June	(Austria) Austrian Grand Prix	Salzburgring	No race held	(Spain) Jorge Martínez	(Switzerland) Jacques Cornu	(United States) Eddie Lawson	Report
8	25 June	(Netherlands) Dutch TT	Assen	(Spain) Jorge Martínez	(Spain) Jorge Martínez	(Spain) Juan Garriga	(Australia) Wayne Gardner	Report
9	3 July	(Belgium) Belgian Grand Prix	Spa	No race held	(Spain) Jorge Martínez	(Spain) Sito Pons	(Australia) Wayne Gardner	Report
10	17 July	(Socialist Federal Republic of Yugoslavia) Yugoslavian Grand Prix	Rijeka	(Spain) Jorge Martínez	(Spain) Jorge Martínez	(Spain) Sito Pons	(Australia) Wayne Gardner	Report
11	24 July	(France) French Grand Prix	Paul Ricard	No race held	(Spain) Jorge Martínez	(Switzerland) Jacques Cornu	(United States) Eddie Lawson	Report
12	7 August	(United Kingdom) British Grand Prix	Donington	No race held	(Italy) Ezio Gianola	(Italy) Luca Cadalora	(United States) Wayne Rainey	Report
13	14 August	(Sweden) Swedish Grand Prix	Anderstorp	No race held	(Spain) Jorge Martínez	(Spain) Sito Pons	(United States) Eddie Lawson	Report
14	28 August	(Czechoslovakia) Czechoslovak Grand Prix	Brno	(Spain) Jorge Martínez	(Spain) Jorge Martínez	(Spain) Juan Garriga	(Australia) Wayne Gardner	Report
15	17 September	(Brazil) Brazilian Grand Prix	Goiânia	No race held	No race held	(France) Dominique Sarron	(United States) Eddie Lawson	Report

=== 500cc riders' standings ===
Scoring system

Points are awarded to the top fifteen finishers. A rider has to finish the race to earn points.

Position	1st	2nd	3rd	4th	5th	6th	7th	8th	9th	10th	11th	12th	13th	14th	15th
Points	20	17	15	13	11	10	9	8	7	6	5	4	3	2	1

Pos	Rider	Team	Machine	JPN (Japan)	USA (United States)	ESP (Spain)	AND (Andalusia)	NAT (Italy)	GER (Germany)	AUT (Austria)	NED (Netherlands)	BEL (Belgium)	YUG (Socialist Federal Republic of Yugoslavia)	FRA (France)	GBR (United Kingdom)	SWE (Sweden)	TCH (Czechoslovakia)	BRA (Brazil)	Pts
1	(United States) Eddie Lawson	Marlboro Yamaha-Agostini	YZR500	3	1	2	1	1	4	1	2	2	10	1	6	1	2	1	252
2	(Australia) Wayne Gardner	Rothmans Honda-HRC	NSR500	2	2	3	5	2	8	Ret	1	1	1	4	2	2	1	2	229
3	(United States) Wayne Rainey	Lucky Strike Yamaha-Roberts	YZR500	6	4	6	2	3	2	3	7	5	3	5	1	5	3	Ret	189
4	(France) Christian Sarron	Sonauto Gauloises-Yamaha	YZR500	8	6	4	4	Ret	3	Ret	3	Ret	2	2	3	3	Ret	5	149
5	(Australia) Kevin Magee	Lucky Strike Yamaha-Roberts	YZR500	7	Ret	1	3	5	5	6	4	Ret	5	9	5	6	Ret	6	138
6	(United Kingdom) Niall Mackenzie	HB-Honda	NSR500	4	3	5	7	11	9	Ret	5	11	Ret	Ret	4	4	6	4	125
7	(Belgium) Didier de Radiguès	Marlboro Yamaha-Agostini	YZR500	9	8	8	6	Ret	7	2	12	4	6	7	7	7	Ret	9	120
8	(United States) Kevin Schwantz	Pepsi-Suzuki	RGV500	1	5	Ret	Ret	4	1	4	8	Ret		3	Ret	12	Ret	3	119
9	(Italy) Pierfrancesco Chili	HB Honda-Gallina	NSR500	14	Ret	7		6	6	5	6	8	11	8	8	9	4	7	110
10	(United Kingdom) Rob McElnea	Pepsi-Suzuki	RGV500	Ret	9	12	8	12	11	9	10	6	8	11	Ret	13	8	8	83
11	(United Kingdom) Ron Haslam	Team Elf-ROC	Elf5-RS500	12	7	10	Ret	16	Ret	8	13	7	9	10	14	11	7	Ret	68
12	(United States) Randy Mamola	Cagiva	GP500	Ret				7	Ret	Ret	Ret	3	4	6	11	10	Ret	Ret	58
13	(Japan) Shunji Yatsushiro	Rothmans Honda-HRC	NSR500	10	Ret	9	Ret	8	10	7	11	9	7	Ret					57
14	(France) Patrick Igoa	Sonauto Gauloises-Yamaha	YZR500	13				15	12	10	9	10	12	Ret	16	Ret	9	10	44
15	(Japan) Tadahiko Taira	Yamaha Japan	YZR500	5				10							10	14	5		36
16	(Italy) Alessandro Valesi	Team Iberna	RS500	19	11	13	10	13	16	Ret	Ret	12	Ret	14	Ret	Ret	13	Ret	19
17	(Italy) Marco Papa	Team Greco	RS500			Ret	9	24	14	Ret	14	14	Ret	18	Ret		12		17
18	(United Kingdom) Roger Burnett	Rothmans Honda-HRC	NSR500					Ret							9	8	Ret	Ret	15
19	(United States) Mike Baldwin		RS500		10	Ret						20	14	13	13				14
20	(France) Raymond Roche	Cagiva	GP500	Ret	Ret	11	Ret	9					Ret	Ret	Ret	15	Ret		13
21	(San Marino) Fabio Barchitta		RS500			18		18	Ret		Ret	29	16	15	18	16	10	11	12
22	(Switzerland) Bruno Kneubühler	Römer Racing Suisse	RS500			15	14	19	25	12	17	25	15	Ret	Ret	20	15	Ret	9
23	(United Kingdom) Donnie McLeod		RS500									13	13	16				13	9
24	(Switzerland) Marco Gentile	Marlboro Fior	Fior-RS500	Ret	Ret	Ret	Ret	14	17	Ret	15	30	Ret	17	20	19	11	Ret	8
25	(Spain) Daniel Amatriain	Ducados-Honda	RS500			14	11	Ret	Ret	Ret	18	22	19	Ret	19	Ret	Ret		7
26	(Japan) Hikaru Miyagi	Honda	NSR500	11															5
27	(Germany) Gustav Reiner	Team Hein Gericke	RS500			Ret				11	Ret								5
28	(United Kingdom) Steve Manley	Gateford Motors	RG500			16	12	Ret			Ret								4
29	(Australia) Malcolm Campbell	Team Elf-ROC	Elf5-RS500										Ret	12					4
30	(Japan) Norihiko Fujiwara	Yamaha Japan	YZR500	Ret											12	17			4
31	(Spain) Francisco Gonzales		RS500															12	4
32	(Italy) Fabio Biliotti	Team Amaranto	Paton-RS500			Ret		Ret		13	16	16	17	19	15	Ret	16		4
33	(France) Rachel Nicotte	PVI Racing / Jacadi	RS500			17	13	23				19		Ret	Ret		20		3
34	(Germany) Peter Schleef	Schuh Racing Team	RS500						13		Ret								3
35	(Italy) Massimo Broccoli	Cagiva	GP500					Ret	Ret	14									2
36	(Sweden) Peter Linden	Honda Sweden	RS500						Ret							18	14		2
37	(Japan) Osamu Hiwatashi	Suzuki Japan	RGV500	15															1
38	(Netherlands) Maarten Duyzers	HDJ International	RS500			21	15	25	19		Ret	Ret	Ret	24	22	Ret			1
39	(Germany) Michael Rudroff		RS500						15		19		Ret						1
40	(Germany) Manfred Fischer	Team Hein Gericke	RS500	Ret				Ret	Ret	15	Ret	Ret		20			19		1
41	(Netherlands) Cees Doorakkers	Grundig-Daf Racing Team	RS500								Ret	15							1
42	(Japan) Shinji Katayama	Yamaha Japan	YZR500	16															0
43	(Switzerland) Nicholas Schmassman	FMS	RS500			19	16	26	24	19	Ret	28		23	25	Ret	22		0
44	(Luxembourg) Andreas Leuthe		RG500			Ret	Ret		Ret	16	Ret	27	21		Ret		Ret		0
45	(Japan) Masaru Mizutani	Suzuki Japan	RGV500	17															0
46	(Austria) Josef Doppler	MRC Grieskirchen	RS500				17		20	18	21	21							0
47	(Italy) Alberto Rota		RS500					17											0
48	(Germany) Franz Holzmeier		RS500							17									0
49	(Republic of Ireland) Eddie Laycock	Millar Racing	RS500			Ret	Ret				20	17	20	21	17		Ret		0
50	(Switzerland) Wolfgang van Muralt		RG500			Ret			18				23	Ret	Ret	22	17		0
51	(Japan) Keiji Kinoshita		RS500	18															0
52	(United Kingdom) Ian Pratt		RG500			Ret	18												0
53	(Netherlands) Kees van der Endt	Autobedrijf Koens	RS500								22	18			24				0
54	(Austria) Karl Truchsess		RS500								Ret		18				21		0
55	(Socialist Federal Republic of Yugoslavia) Silvo Habat	Fego Racing Team	RS500								23		22				18		0
56	(France) Jean Luc Demierre		RG500			20		Ret					24	Ret					0
57	(Italy) Romolo Balbi		RS500					20											0
58	(Germany) Georg Jung		RS500						Ret	20		24	25						0
59	(Finland) Ari Ramo		RS500					21	22			26	Ret						0
60	(Germany) Helmut Schutz		RS500						21	21			26						0
61	(United Kingdom) Dave Leach		RG500												21				0
62	(Sweden) Peter Skold		RS500					22	23							21			0
63	(Switzerland) Chris Buerki		RS500			22				Ret						26			0
64	(France) Claude Arciero		RS500											22					0
65	(Netherlands) Johann Ten Napel		RG500									23							0
66	(United Kingdom) Simon Buckmaster		RS500												23	23	Ret		0
67	(Denmark) Claus Wulff		RS500									31				24	23		0
68	(Czechoslovakia) Pavol Dekánek		RS500										Ret				24		0
69	(Sweden) Ake Dahli		RG500													25			0
70	(Sweden) Lars Johansson		RG500													27			0
71	(Japan) Hisashi Yamana		RG500	Ret															0
72	(Japan) Katunori Shinozaki		RG500	Ret															0
73	(United States) John Long		YZR500		Ret														0
74	(France) Claude Albert		RG500			Ret													0
75	(Italy) Vincenzo Cascino		RS500			Ret		Ret											0
76	(Venezuela) Larry Moreno Vacondio		RS500				Ret			Ret		Ret							0
77	(Republic of Ireland) Tony Carey		RG500				Ret												0
78	(Germany) Hans Klingbiel		RG500						Ret										0
79	(Germany) Hansjörg Butz		RS500						Ret										0
80	(Netherlands) Koos van Leyen		RG500								Ret								0
81	(Italy) Vittorio Scatola	Team Amaranto	Paton-RS500								Ret			Ret					0
82	(France) Eric Sabatier		RS500											Ret					0
83	(France) Thierry Rapicault	Marlboro Fior	Fior-RS500											Ret					0
84	(United Kingdom) Darren Dixon		RG500												Ret				0
85	(United Kingdom) Steve Spray		RG500												Ret				0
86	(Sweden) Thomas Aronsson		Nicco Bakker-RS500													Ret			0

=== 250cc standings ===
Place	Rider	Number	Country	Team	Machine	Points	Wins
1	(Spain) Sito Pons	3	Spain	Campsa-Honda	NSR250	231	4
2	(Spain) Juan Garriga	11	Spain	Ducados-Yamaha	YZR250	221	3
3	(Switzerland) Jacques Cornu	9	Switzerland	Parisienne Elf-Honda	NSR250	166	2
4	(France) Dominique Sarron	4	France	Rothmans-Honda France	NSR250	158	2
5	(Germany) Reinhold Roth	2	West Germany	HB Römer-Honda	NSR250	158	0
6	(Italy) Luca Cadalora	7	Italy	Marlboro-Yamaha	YZR250	136	2
7	(France) Jean-Philippe Ruggia	17	France	Gauloises Blondes-Yamaha	YZR250	104	0
8	(Germany) Anton Mang	1	West Germany	Rothmans-Honda Germany	NSR250	87	1
9	(Spain) Carlos Cardús	5	Spain	Ducados-Honda	NSR250	71	0
10	(Japan) Masahiro Shimizu	12	Japan	Ajinomoto-Honda	NSR250	68	0
11	Carlos Lavado					55	
12	Donnie McLeod					47	
13	Loris Reggiani					44	
14	Martin Wimmer					40	
15	Manfred Herweh					35	
16	August Auinger					31	
17	Helmut Bradl					27	
18	Ivan Palazzese					25	
19	John Kocinski					24	
20	Harald Eckl					22	
21	Jim Filice					20	
22	Stefano Caracchi					20	
23	Bruno Casanova					17	
24	Masaru Kobayashi					15	
25	Jean Michel Mattioli					12	
26	Maurizio Vitali					12	
27	Bubba Shobert					11	
28	Harald Becker					11	
29	Jean Foray					10	
30	Alberto Puig					10	
31	Jean-François Baldé					10	
32	Toshihiko Honma					8	
33	Masumitsu Taguchi					6	
34	Jochen Schmid					6	
35	Hiroyuki Kikuchi					5	
36	Erich Neumair					5	
37	Guy Bertin					5	
38	Wilco Zeelenberg						
39	Hermann Holder					4	
40	Urs Jücker					4	
41	Kyoji Nanba					4	
42	Garry Cowan					3	
43	Urs Lüzi					3	
44	Paolo Casoli					3	
45	Takehiro Yamamoto					2	
46	Massimo Matteoni					2	
47	Keiji Tamura					1	
48	Alan Carter					1	

=== 125cc standings ===
Place	Rider	Number	Country	Machine	Points	Wins
1	(Spain) Jorge Martinez	5	Spain	Derbi	197	9
2	(Italy) Ezio Gianola	6	Italy	Honda	168	2
3	(Netherlands) Hans Spaan	27	Netherlands	Honda	110	0
4	(Spain) Julian Miralles	3	Spain	Honda	104	0
5	(Italy) Domenico Brigaglia	4	Italy	Rotax	69	0
6	(Italy) Gastone Grassetti	12	Italy	Honda	66	0
7	(Germany) Adi Stadler		West Germany	Honda	63	0
8	(Germany) Stefan Prein	35	West Germany	Honda	59	0
9	(Belgium) Lucio Pietroniro	9	Belgium	Honda	56	0
10	(Germany) Gerhard Waibel	6	West Germany	Honda	52	0
11	Hisashi Unemoto				43	
12	Alan Scott				38	
13	Corrado Catalano				36	
14	Luis Miguel Reyes				34	
15	Manuel Herreros				30	
16	Heinz Lüthi				30	
17	Koji Takada				29	
18	Johnny Wickstroem				25	
19	Pierpaolo Bianchi				24	
20	Alfred Waibel				24	
21	Fausto Gresini				22	
22	Josef Fischer				19	
23	Kris Galatowicz				19	
24	Hubert Abold				18	
25	Bady Hassaine				14	
26	Robin Milton				13	
27	Mike Leitner				11	
28	Ian McConnachie				10	
29	Alex Bedford				8	
30	Jussi Hautaniemi				8	
31	Flemming Kistrup				7	
32	Alex Criville				7	
33	Esa Kytölä				6	
34	Robin Appleyard				6	
35	Thierry Feuz				6	
36	Manuel Hernandez				4	
37	Stefan Dörflinger				2	
38	Taru Rinne				2	
39	Paul Bordes				1	
40	Emilio Cuppini				1	

=== 80cc standings ===
Place	Rider	Number	Country	Machine	Points	Wins
1	(Spain) Jorge Martínez	1	Spain	Derbi	137	6
2	(Spain) Àlex Crivillé		Spain	Derbi	90	0
3	(Switzerland) Stefan Dörflinger	4	Switzerland	Krauser GmbH	77	1
4	(Spain) Manuel Herreros	2	Spain	Derbi	69	0
5	(Germany) Peter Öttl	5	West Germany	Krauser GmbH	65	0
6	(Bulgaria) Bogdan Nikolov		Bulgaria	Krauser GmbH	55	0
7	(Hungary) Károly Juhász		Hungary	Krauser GmbH	54	0
8	(Netherlands) Jos van Dongen		Netherlands	Casal	47	0
9	(Italy) Giuseppe Ascareggi		Italy	BBFT	46	0
10	(Italy) Gabriele Gnani		Italy	Gnani	36	0
11	Herri Torrontegui				28	
12	Jörg Seel				27	
13	Andrie Nijenhuis				27	
14	Günter Schirnhofer				27	
15	Bert Smit				25	
16	René Dünki				22	
17	Reiner Koster				11	
18	Heinz Paschen				10	
19	Hans Koopman				10	
20	Serge Julin				8	
21	Jacques Bernard				8	
22	Paolo Priori				6	
23	Ian McConnachie				6	
24	Rudolf Kunz				5	
25	Janos Szabo				5	
26	Janez Pintar				4	
27	Stefan Bragger				3	
28	Xavier Arumi				3	
29	Hagen Klein				2	
30	Hubert Abold				2	
31	Alojz Pavlic				1	
32	Jaime Mariano				1	
