= Kevin Magee (motorcyclist) =

Australian motorcycle racer (born 1962)

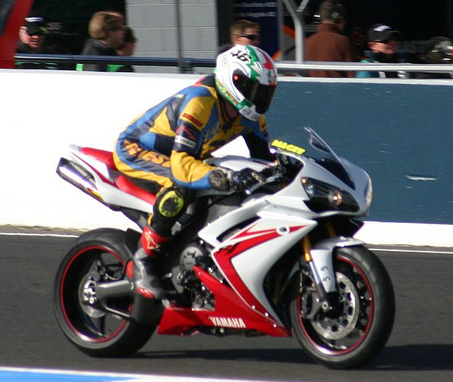
- Nationality: Australia
- Born: 16 July 1962 (age 64); Horsham, Victoria, Australia
Motorcycle racing career statistics
Grand Prix motorcycle racing
Active years	1987 - 1991, 1993
First race	1987 500cc Japanese Grand Prix
Last race	1993 500cc Japanese Grand Prix
First win	1988 500cc Spanish Grand Prix
Last win	1988 500cc Spanish Grand Prix
Team(s)	Yamaha, Suzuki
Championships	0
Starts / Wins / Podiums / Poles / F. laps / Points; 36 / 1 / 3 / 1 / 1 / 326.5

Kevin Bernard Magee (born 16 July 1962 in Horsham, Victoria) is an Australian former Grand Prix motorcycle road racer who raced in 36 grands prix during his career, winning the 1988 Spanish Grand Prix. He is currently a television commentator for Fox Sports Australia.

== Career ==
=== Early career ===
Magee's career began with production and Superbike racing, at home in Australia and also in Japan. He gained early notice racing the Bob Brown Ducati in the Australian Superbike Championship and then joined Mike Dowson at the Warren Willing-managed Yamaha Dealer Team to race the then premier Production race series as well as the growing Superbike series. In 1986, he gained international attention when he and Dowson scored a second place in the Suzuka 8 Hours race on a lower-spec Superbike. His Grand Prix debut was delayed after he broke his leg crashing at the Arai 500 race at Bathurst when, leading by a clear margin, he was confused by his pitboards and thought another rider was closing in on him. At the end of year, Magee was given the opportunity to ride a Yamaha Factory Grand Prix bike and distinguished himself by winning two of the six races.

=== Grand Prix ===
In 1987, Magee got his break in the 500cc world championship with three wildcard appearance on the Kenny Roberts Yamaha team. Crashing in the opening Japanese Grand Prix, he earned a point in the rain-affected Dutch TT before scoring an impressive third place in his third ever Grand Prix at the Portuguese Grand Prix round. Having teamed up with Martin Wimmer to win the 1987 Suzuka 8 Hours endurance race, and having also won the 1987 round of the now-defunct Formula 1 motorcycle championship at Sugo, he became the only rider to stand on the podium of three different World Championships in a calendar year.

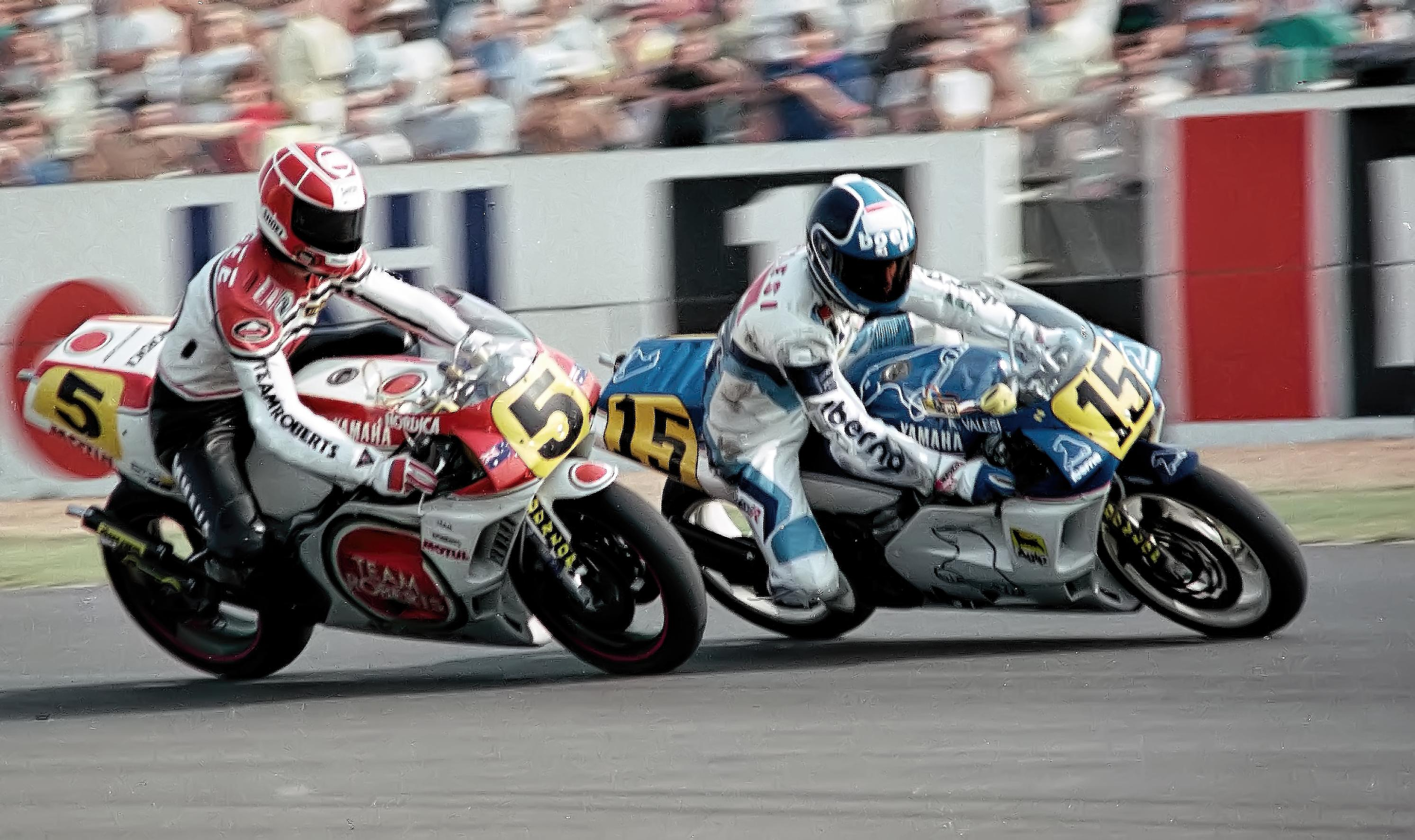
Magee (left), battling with Alessandro Valesi at the 1989 British Grand Prix.

In 1988, Magee was awarded Randy Mamola's place in the Kenny Roberts team, competing as teammate to Wayne Rainey for the next two seasons. He also returned to the Suzuka 8 Hours race, teaming with Wayne Rainey to claim another win.

Magee won his first Grand Prix at the 1988 Spanish motorcycle Grand Prix at Jarama and the future looked bright for the young rider. However, at the 1989 United States motorcycle Grand Prix, he was involved in a terrible crash with Bubba Shobert on the cool off lap after the race, wherein Shobert drove into the back of Magee's motorcycle. Magee stopped his motorcycle in the middle of the track and performed a rear-wheel "burnout", presumably due to frustration that dwindling fuel had cost him third place in the race. The wreck occurred while Shobert was congratulating racer Eddie Lawson and it ended Shobert's career. Ironically, Magee would crash at the same spot during the 1990 race, suffering head injuries that put him out for the season. In 1991, he appeared a couple of times for Suzuki and once for Team Roberts, along with another wildcard Grand Prix appearance in 1993.

Magee also entered a few Superbike World Championship races, winning twice at his home race at Phillip Island in 1991 and 1992. He also raced in the AMA Superbike series in 1994, for the American Honda team before announcing his retirement.

== Post racing ==
Magee is still a familiar face with Australian motorcycle-racing fans in his position as co-commentator on Australian Grand Prix and Superbike telecasts on Australia's largest Pay-TV provider Foxtel teaming with Warren Smith on Fox Sports. He is also an occasional tester and writer for Two Wheels magazine. In 2020, he appeared in the documentary movie Dark Rider, as navigator for the blind motorcycle rider Ben Felten, setting the world speed record for a blind rider.

== Family ==
On 27 April 2002, Kevin's 19-year-old nephew Liam Magee, the son of his older brother Peter, was racing in the Australian Superbike Championship when he was killed in practice for the round at the Mallala Motorsport Park in South Australia. The younger Magee crashed at turn 4 (the kink, on the back straight) his bike slid off the track into the concrete retaining wall located only a short distance from the track and he died at the scene, the bike reportedly travelling at over 100 km/h at the time of impact. The concrete wall Liam Magee hit had replaced an old tyre wall in 1998 in an effort to provide more grandstand seating for the circuit.

== Career results ==
=== Grand Prix motorcycle racing ===
(key) (Races in bold indicate pole position; races in italics indicate fastest lap)

Year	Class	Team	Bike	1	2	3	4	5	6	7	8	9	10	11	12	13	14	15	Points	Rank	Wins
1987	500cc	Roberts-Yamaha	YZR500	JPN; Ret	ESP	GER	NAT	AUT	YUG	NED; 10	FRA	GBR	SWE	CZE	RSM	POR; 3	BRA	ARG	11	15th	0
1988	500cc	Lucky Strike Roberts-Yamaha	YZR500	JPN; 7	USA; Ret	**ESP**; 1	EXP; 3	NAT; 5	GER; 5	AUT; 6	NED; 4	BEL; 5	YUG; 5	FRA; 9	GBR; 5	SWE; 6	CZE; Ret	BRA; 6	138	5th	1
1989	500cc	Lucky Strike Roberts-Yamaha	YZR500	JPN; 5	AUS; 4	USA; 4	ESP	NAT	GER; 7	AUT; 5	YUG; 4	NED; 4	BEL; 7	FRA; 5	GBR; 6	SWE; 5	CZE; 7	BRA; 6	138.5	5th	0
1990	500cc	Lucky Strike-Suzuki	RGV500	JPN; 4	USA; Ret	ESP	NAT	GER	AUT	YUG	NED	BEL	FRA	GBR	SWE	CZE	HUN	AUS	13	21st	0
1991	500cc	Lucky Strike-Suzuki	Suzuki RGV500	JPN; 13	AUS; 11	USA	ESP	ITA	GER	AUT	EUR	NED	FRA	GBR	RSM	CZE	VDM	MAL; 5	19	19th	0
1993	500cc	Nihontelecom RT Yamaha	YZR500	AUS	MAL	JPN; 9	ESP	AUT	GER	NED	EUR	RSM	GBR	CZE	ITA	USA	FIM		7	25th	0

=== Suzuka 8 Hours ===
Year	Team	Co-Rider	Bike	Pos
1987	(Japan) Shiseido Tech 21 Racing Team	(Australia) Kevin Magee (Germany) Martin Wimmer	Yamaha YZF750	1st
1988	(United States) Team Lucky Strike Roberts	(Australia) Kevin Magee (United States) Wayne Rainey	Yamaha YZF750	1st
