= 1988 Belgian motorcycle Grand Prix =

(Belgium) 1988 Belgian Grand Prix
Race details
- Race 9 of 15 races in the 1988 Grand Prix motorcycle racing season
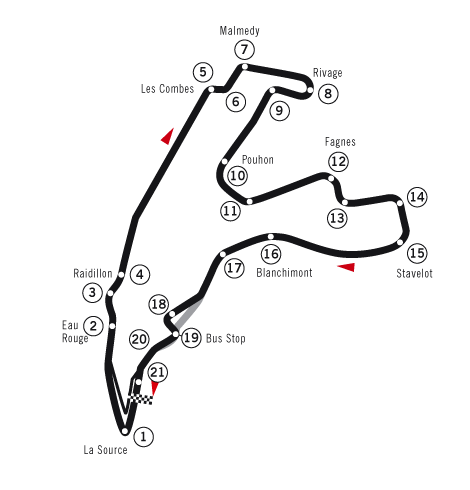
- Date: 3 July 1988
- Official name: G.P. of Belgium Gauloises Blondes
- Location: Circuit de Spa-Francorchamps
- Course: Permanent racing facility; 6.940 km (4.312 mi)

500cc
Pole position
Rider	(France) Christian Sarron	Yamaha
Time	2:27.620	
Fastest lap
Rider	(France) Christian Sarron	Yamaha
Time	2:40.780	
Podium
First	(Australia) Wayne Gardner	Honda
Second	(United States) Eddie Lawson	Yamaha
Third	(United States) Randy Mamola	Cagiva

250cc
Pole position
Rider	(Switzerland) Jacques Cornu	Honda
Time	2:33.090	
Fastest lap
Rider	(West Germany) Anton Mang	Honda
Time	2:32.060	
Podium
First	(Spain) Sito Pons	Honda
Second	(Switzerland) Jacques Cornu	Honda
Third	(West Germany) Anton Mang	Honda

125cc
Pole position
Rider	(Spain) Jorge Martínez	Derbi
Time	2:46.280	
Fastest lap
Rider	(Italy) Gastone Grassetti	Honda
Time	2:50.290	
Podium
First	(Spain) Jorge Martínez	Derbi
Second	(Italy) Ezio Gianola	Honda
Third	(Spain) Julián Miralles	Honda

Sidecar (B2A)
Pole position
Rider	(Switzerland) Rolf Biland	LCR-Krauser
Passenger	(Switzerland) Kurt Waltisperg	
Fastest lap
Rider	(Switzerland) Rolf Biland	LCR-Krauser
Passenger	(Switzerland) Kurt Waltisperg	
Podium
First rider	(Switzerland) Rolf Biland	LCR-Krauser
First passenger	(Switzerland) Kurt Waltisperg	
Second rider	(United Kingdom) Steve Webster	LCR-Krauser
Second passenger	(United Kingdom) Tony Hewitt	
Third rider	(United Kingdom) Derek Jones	LCR-Yamaha
Third passenger	(United Kingdom) Peter Brown	

The 1988 Belgian motorcycle Grand Prix was the ninth round of the 1988 Grand Prix motorcycle racing season. It took place on the weekend of 1–3 July 1988 at Spa-Francorchamps.

== 500 cc race report ==
Wet track (but it was not raining).

Christian Sarron on pole, and through the first turn it was Wayne Gardner, Kevin Schwantz, Eddie Lawson, et al.

Gardner got a gap from Lawson, Sarron, Schwantz, Wayne Rainey, Pierfrancesco Chili, Didier De Radiguès and Ron Haslam.

Sarron through to 2nd and was catching Gardner.

Randy Mamola moved past Rainey and De Radiguès to get to 4th behind Schwantz.

Sarron touched a white line and slid out of 2nd, putting Lawson behind Gardner. Schwantz crashed out of 4th as De Radiguès and Rainey went by; he tried to get up but looked like he injured his left leg.

== 500 cc classification ==
Pos.	Rider	Team	Manufacturer	Time/Retired	Points
1	(Australia) Wayne Gardner	Rothmans Honda Team	Honda	46:55.210	20
2	(United States) Eddie Lawson	Marlboro Yamaha Team Agostini	Yamaha	+30.110	17
3	(United States) Randy Mamola	Cagiva Corse	Cagiva	+40.780	15
4	(Belgium) Didier de Radiguès	Marlboro Yamaha Team Agostini	Yamaha	+41.610	13
5	(United States) Wayne Rainey	Team Lucky Strike Roberts	Yamaha	+43.170	11
6	(United Kingdom) Rob McElnea	Suzuki Pepsi Cola	Suzuki	+1:17.330	10
7	(United Kingdom) Ron Haslam	Team ROC Elf Honda	Elf Honda	+1:19.100	9
8	(Italy) Pierfrancesco Chili	HB Honda Gallina Team	Honda	+1:44.230	8
9	(Japan) Shunji Yatsushiro	Rothmans Honda Team	Honda	+1:49.720	7
10	(France) Patrick Igoa	Sonauto Gauloises Blondes Yamaha Mobil 1	Yamaha	+1:56.070	6
11	(United Kingdom) Niall Mackenzie	Team HRC	Honda	+2:00.010	5
12	(Italy) Alessandro Valesi	Team Iberia	Honda	+2:12.060	4
13	(United Kingdom) Donnie McLeod	Racing Team Katayama	Honda	+1 Lap	3
14	(Italy) Marco Papa	Team Greco	Honda	+1 Lap	2
15	(Netherlands) Cees Doorakkers	Grundig-Daf Racing Team	Honda	+1 Lap	1
16	(Italy) Fabio Biliotti	Team Amoranto	Honda	+1 Lap	
17	(Republic of Ireland) Eddie Laycock	Millar Racing	Honda	+1 Lap	
18	(Netherlands) Kees van der Endt	Autobedrijf Koens	Honda	+1 Lap	
19	(France) Rachel Nicotte	PVI Racing	Honda	+1 Lap	
20	(United States) Mike Baldwin	Racing Team Katayama	Honda	+1 Lap	
21	(Austria) Josef Doppler	MRC Grieskirchen	Honda	+1 Lap	
22	(Spain) Daniel Amatriain	Ducados Lotus Guarz	Honda	+1 Lap	
23	(Netherlands) Johan Ten Napel		Suzuki	+1 Lap	
24	(Germany) Georg Robert Jung	Weigl Telefix Racing Team	Honda	+1 Lap	
25	(Switzerland) Bruno Kneubühler	Romer Racing Suisse	Honda	+1 Lap	
26	(Finland) Ari Ramo		Honda	+1 Lap	
27	(Luxembourg) Andreas Leuthe		Suzuki	+1 Lap	
28	(Switzerland) Nicholas Schmassman	FMS	Honda	+1 Lap	
29	(San Marino) Fabio Barchitta	Racing Team Katayama	Honda	+2 Laps	
30	(Switzerland) Marco Gentile	Fior Marlboro	Fior	+2 Laps	
31	(Denmark) Claus Wulff		Honda	+2 Laps	
Ret	(Netherlands) Maarten Duyzers	HDJ International	Honda	Retirement	
Ret	(France) Christian Sarron	Sonauto Gauloises Blondes Yamaha Mobil 1	Yamaha	Retirement	
Ret	(Germany) Manfred Fischer	Team Hein Gericke	Honda	Retirement	
Ret	(Australia) Kevin Magee	Team Lucky Strike Roberts	Yamaha	Retirement	
Ret	(Venezuela) Larry Moreno Vacondio		Suzuki	Retirement	
Ret	(United States) Kevin Schwantz	Suzuki Pepsi Cola	Suzuki	Retirement	
DNQ	(Czechoslovakia) Josef Krnac		Suzuki	Did not qualify	
DNQ	(Republic of Ireland) Tony Carey		Suzuki	Did not qualify	
DNQ	(United Kingdom) Ian Pratt		Suzuki	Did not qualify	

Previous race: 1988 Dutch TT	FIM Grand Prix World Championship; 1988 season	Next race: 1988 Yugoslavian Grand Prix
Previous race: 1986 Belgian Grand Prix	Belgian Grand Prix	Next race: 1989 Belgian Grand Prix
