= 1988 Spanish motorcycle Grand Prix =

(Spain) 1988 Spanish Grand Prix
Race details
- Race 3 of 15 races in the 1988 Grand Prix motorcycle racing season
- Date: 24 April 1988
- Official name: Gran Premio Marlboro de España
- Location: Circuito Permanente del Jarama
- Course: Permanent racing facility; 3.404 km (2.115 mi)

500cc
Pole position
Rider	(Australia) Kevin Magee	
Time	1:27.140	
Fastest lap
Rider	(Australia) Kevin Magee	
Time	1:28.090	
Podium
First	(Australia) Kevin Magee	Yamaha
Second	(United States) Eddie Lawson	Yamaha
Third	(Australia) Wayne Gardner	Honda

250cc
Pole position
Rider	(Spain) Carlos Cardús	
Time	1:29.500	
Fastest lap
Rider	(Spain) Sito Pons	
Time	1:30.120	
Podium
First	(Spain) Sito Pons	Honda
Second	(Spain) Juan Garriga	Yamaha
Third	(France) Jean-Philippe Ruggia	Yamaha

125cc
Pole position
Rider	(Spain) Jorge Martínez	
Time	1:35.550	
Fastest lap
Rider	(Spain) Jorge Martínez	
Time	1:35.670	
Podium
First	(Spain) Jorge Martínez	Derbi
Second	(Spain) Julián Miralles	Honda
Third	(Italy) Gaston Grassetti	Honda

80cc
Pole position
Rider	(Spain) Jorge Martínez	Derbi
Fastest lap
Rider	(Spain) Àlex Crivillé	Derbi
Podium
First	(Switzerland) Stefan Dörflinger	Krauser
Second	(Spain) Jorge Martínez	Derbi
Third	(Spain) Àlex Crivillé	Derbi

The 1988 Spanish motorcycle Grand Prix was the third round of the 1988 Grand Prix motorcycle racing season. It took place on the weekend of 22–24 April 1988 at the Circuito Permanente Del Jarama.

This was the first and only victory of the Australian Kevin Magee.

== 500 cc race report ==
Kevin Magee was on pole. Eddie Lawson got the lead at the first turn from Raymond Roche, Pierfrancesco Chili, et al. At the end of the first lap, Lawson had a gap from Christian Sarron, Wayne Gardner and Magee. Magee moved into 2nd and started to close the gap to Lawson; he managed to pass and took the win by a few lengths.

After 21 years, this would be the last Spanish motorcycle Grand Prix on the Jarama circuit. The event would move back to Jerez, where it has stayed permanently ever since.

== 500 cc classification ==
Pos.	Rider	Team	Manufacturer	Time/Retired	Points
1	(Australia) Kevin Magee	Team Lucky Strike Roberts	Yamaha	54:52.476	20
2	(United States) Eddie Lawson	Marlboro Yamaha Team Agostini	Yamaha	+0.526	17
3	(Australia) Wayne Gardner	Rothmans Honda Team	Honda	+11.625	15
4	(France) Christian Sarron	Sonauto Gauloises Blondes Yamaha Mobil 1	Yamaha	+17.452	13
5	(United Kingdom) Niall Mackenzie	Team HRC	Honda	+26.990	11
6	(United States) Wayne Rainey	Team Lucky Strike Roberts	Yamaha	+39.743	10
7	(Italy) Pierfrancesco Chili	HB Honda Gallina Team	Honda	+1:12.080	9
8	(Belgium) Didier de Radiguès	Marlboro Yamaha Team Agostini	Yamaha	+1:12.903	8
9	(Japan) Shunji Yatsushiro	Rothmans Honda Team	Honda	+1 Lap	7
10	(United Kingdom) Ron Haslam	Team ROC Elf Honda	Elf Honda	+1 Lap	6
11	(France) Raymond Roche	Cagiva Corse	Cagiva	+1 Lap	5
12	(United Kingdom) Rob McElnea	Suzuki Pepsi Cola	Suzuki	+1 Lap	4
13	(Italy) Alessandro Valesi	Team Iberia	Honda	+1 Lap	3
14	(Spain) Daniel Amatriain	Ducados Lotus Guarz	Honda	+1 Lap	2
15	(Switzerland) Bruno Kneubühler	Romer Racing Suisse	Honda	+1 Lap	1
16	(United Kingdom) Steve Manley	Gateford Motors	Suzuki	+1 Lap	
17	(France) Rachel Nicotte	PVI Racing	Honda	+1 Lap	
18	(San Marino) Fabio Barchitta	Racing Team Katayama	Honda	+2 Laps	
19	(Switzerland) Nicholas Schmassman	FMS	Honda	+2 Laps	
20	(France) Jean Luc Demierre		Suzuki	+2 Laps	
21	(Netherlands) Maarten Duyzers	HDJ International	Honda	+2 Laps	
22	(Switzerland) Christopher Burki		Honda	+1 Lap	
Ret	(United Kingdom) Ian Pratt		Suzuki	Retirement	
Ret	(United States) Kevin Schwantz	Suzuki Pepsi Cola	Suzuki	Retirement	
Ret	(Republic of Ireland) Eddie Laycock	Millar Racing	Honda	Retirement	
Ret	(Switzerland) Marco Gentile	Fior Marlboro	Fior	Retirement	
Ret	(Italy) Marco Papa	Team Greco	Honda	Retirement	
Ret	(Luxembourg) Andreas Leuthe		Suzuki	Retirement	
Ret	(Italy) Fabio Biliotti	Team Amoranto	Paton	Retirement	
Ret	(Switzerland) Wolfgang von Muralt		Suzuki	Retirement	
Ret	(Germany) Gustav Reiner	Team Hein Gericke	Honda	Retirement	
Ret	(Italy) Vincenzo Cascino		Honda	Retirement	
Ret	(France) Claude Albert		Suzuki	Retirement	
Ret	(United States) Mike Baldwin	Racing Team Katayama	Honda	Retirement	
DNS	(Japan) Tadahiko Taira	Tech 21	Yamaha	Did not start	
DNS	(Socialist Federal Republic of Yugoslavia) Silvo Habat	Fego Racing Team	Honda	Did not start	
DNQ	(Venezuela) Larry Moreno Vacondio		Suzuki	Did not qualify	
DNQ	(Austria) Josef Doppler	MRC Grieskirchen	Honda	Did not qualify	
DNQ	(Republic of Ireland) Tony Carey		Suzuki	Did not qualify	

Previous race: 1988 United States Grand Prix	FIM Grand Prix World Championship; 1988 season	Next race: 1988 Expo 92 Grand Prix
Previous race: 1987 Spanish Grand Prix	Spanish motorcycle Grand Prix	Next race: 1989 Spanish Grand Prix
