= 1988 Expo 92 motorcycle Grand Prix =

(Andalusia) 1988 Expo 92 Grand Prix
Race details
- Race 4 of 15 races in the 1988 Grand Prix motorcycle racing season
- Date: 1 May 1988
- Official name: Gran Premio Campsa
- Location: Circuito Permanente de Jerez
- Course: Permanent racing facility; 4.218 km (2.621 mi)

500cc
Pole position
| Rider | (United States) Eddie Lawson | Yamaha |
| Time | 1:50.120 | |
Fastest lap
| Rider | (United States) Eddie Lawson | Yamaha |
| Time | 1:49.029 | |
Podium
| First | (United States) Eddie Lawson | Yamaha |
| Second | (United States) Wayne Rainey | Yamaha |
| Third | (Australia) Kevin Magee | Yamaha |

250cc
Pole position
| Rider | (Venezuela) Carlos Lavado | Yamaha |
Fastest lap
| Rider | (Spain) Juan Garriga | Yamaha |
| Time | 1:51.650 | |
Podium
| First | (Spain) Juan Garriga | Yamaha |
| Second | (Japan) Masahiro Shimizu | Honda |
| Third | (Switzerland) Jacques Cornu | Honda |

80cc
Pole position
| Rider | (Spain) Jorge Martínez | Derbi |
Fastest lap
| Rider | (Switzerland) Stefan Dörflinger | Krauser |
| Time | 2:03.410 | |
Podium
| First | (Spain) Jorge Martínez | Derbi |
| Second | (Spain) Manuel Herreros | Derbi |
| Third | (Spain) Àlex Crivillé | Derbi |

Sidecar (B2A)
Pole position
| Rider | (Switzerland) Rolf Biland | LCR-Krauser |
| Passenger | (Switzerland) Kurt Waltisperg | |
| Time | 1:49.370 | |
Fastest lap
| Rider | (United Kingdom) Steve Webster | LCR-Krauser |
| Passenger | (United Kingdom) Tony Hewitt | |
| Time | 1:56.870 | |
Podium
| First rider | (Switzerland) Rolf Biland | LCR-Krauser |
| First passenger | (Switzerland) Kurt Waltisperg | |
| Second rider | (Netherlands) Egbert Streuer | LCR-Yamaha |
| Second passenger | (Netherlands) Bernard Schnieders | |
| Third rider | (United Kingdom) Steve Webster | LCR-Krauser |
| Third passenger | (United Kingdom) Tony Hewitt | |

The 1988 "Expo 92" Grand Prix was the fourth race of the 1988 Grand Prix motorcycle racing season. It took place on the weekend of 29 April–1 May 1988 at the Circuito Permanente de Jerez.

While the race is called the EXPO 92 Grand Prix, the race is classified as the "Portuguese Grand Prix", despite the fact that it is not called that.

== 500 cc race report ==
Eddie Lawson on pole. Wayne Rainey got the start from Lawson and Kevin Schwantz.

Schwantz passed Lawson at the final hairpin, and after the first lap, the order was Rainey, Schwantz, Lawson, Christian Sarron and Kevin Magee.

Schwantz tried to close the gap to Rainey, but started to look behind him more than usual, and it seemed his Suzuki was having problems. Magee 3rd ahead of Lawson. Schwantz quickly dropped to 4th and looked at his rear wheel; he soon headed into the pits.

Lawson fought back and swapped the lead with Magee and then went after Rainey.

Catching up to Rainey who had led for 27 laps, Lawson had a very hard time getting past, but finally managed it.

== 500 cc classification ==
| Pos. | Rider | Team | Manufacturer | Time/Retired | Points |
|---|---|---|---|---|---|
| 1 | (United States) Eddie Lawson | Marlboro Yamaha Team Agostini | Yamaha | 53:47.990 | 20 |
| 2 | (United States) Wayne Rainey | Team Lucky Strike Roberts | Yamaha | +1.640 | 17 |
| 3 | (Australia) Kevin Magee | Team Lucky Strike Roberts | Yamaha | +7.670 | 15 |
| 4 | (France) Christian Sarron | Sonauto Gauloises Blondes Yamaha Mobil 1 | Yamaha | +7.790 | 13 |
| 5 | (Australia) Wayne Gardner | Rothmans Honda Team | Honda | +28.630 | 11 |
| 6 | (Belgium) Didier de Radiguès | Marlboro Yamaha Team Agostini | Yamaha | +30.520 | 10 |
| 7 | (United Kingdom) Niall Mackenzie | Team HRC | Honda | +1:12.030 | 9 |
| 8 | (United Kingdom) Rob McElnea | Suzuki Pepsi Cola | Suzuki | +1:37.420 | 8 |
| 9 | (Italy) Marco Papa | Team Greco | Honda | +1 Lap | 7 |
| 10 | (Italy) Alessandro Valesi | Team Iberia | Honda | +1 Lap | 6 |
| 11 | (Spain) Daniel Amatriain | Ducados Lotus Guarz | Honda | +1 Lap | 5 |
| 12 | (United Kingdom) Steve Manley | Gateford Motors | Suzuki | +1 Lap | 4 |
| 13 | (France) Rachel Nicotte | PVI Racing | Honda | +1 Lap | 3 |
| 14 | (Switzerland) Bruno Kneubühler | Romer Racing Suisse | Honda | +1 Lap | 2 |
| 15 | (Netherlands) Maarten Duyzers | HDJ International | Honda | +1 Lap | 1 |
| 16 | (Switzerland) Nicholas Schmassman | FMS | Honda | +2 Laps | |
| 17 | (Austria) Josef Doppler | MRC Grieskirchen | Honda | +2 Laps | |
| 18 | (United Kingdom) Ian Pratt | | Suzuki | +2 Laps | |
| Ret | (Japan) Shunji Yatsushiro | Rothmans Honda Team | Honda | Retirement | |
| Ret | (United Kingdom) Ron Haslam | Team ROC Elf Honda | Elf Honda | Retirement | |
| Ret | (Venezuela) Larry Moreno Vacondio | | Suzuki | Retirement | |
| Ret | (Republic of Ireland) Tony Carey | | Suzuki | Retirement | |
| Ret | (France) Raymond Roche | Cagiva Corse | Cagiva | Retirement | |
| Ret | (Republic of Ireland) Eddie Laycock | Millar Racing | Honda | Retirement | |
| Ret | (Luxembourg) Andreas Leuthe | | Suzuki | Retirement | |
| Ret | (United States) Kevin Schwantz | Suzuki Pepsi Cola | Suzuki | Retirement | |
| Ret | (Switzerland) Marco Gentile | Fior Marlboro | Fior | Retirement | |
| DNS | (Italy) Pierfrancesco Chili | HB Honda Gallina Team | Honda | Did not start | |

| Previous race: 1988 Spanish Grand Prix | FIM Grand Prix World Championship; 1988 season | Next race: 1988 Nations Grand Prix |
| Previous race: 1987 Spanish Grand Prix | "Expo 92" Grand Prix | Next race: 1989 Spanish Grand Prix |
