= 1988 Dutch TT =

(Netherlands) 1988 Dutch TT
Race details
- Race 8 of 15 races in the 1988 Grand Prix motorcycle racing season
- Date: 25 June 1988
- Official name: Dutch-TT
- Location: TT Circuit Assen
- Course: Permanent racing facility; 6.049 km (3.759 mi)

500cc
Pole position
| Rider | (France) Christian Sarron | Yamaha |
| Time | 2:10.940 | |
Fastest lap
| Rider | (Australia) Wayne Gardner | Honda |
| Time | 2:11.280 | |
Podium
| First | (Australia) Wayne Gardner | Honda |
| Second | (United States) Eddie Lawson | Yamaha |
| Third | (France) Christian Sarron | Yamaha |

250cc
Pole position
| Rider | (France) Dominique Sarron | Honda |
| Time | 2:16.460 | |
Fastest lap
| Rider | (Germany) Anton Mang | Honda |
| Time | 2:16.000 | |
Podium
| First | (Spain) Juan Garriga | Yamaha |
| Second | (Switzerland) Jacques Cornu | Honda |
| Third | (Germany) Anton Mang | Honda |

125cc
Pole position
| Rider | (Netherlands) Hans Spaan | Honda |
| Time | 2:27.500 | |
Fastest lap
| Rider | (Spain) Jorge Martínez | Derbi |
| Time | 2:26.520 | |
Podium
| First | (Spain) Jorge Martínez | Derbi |
| Second | (Italy) Ezio Gianola | Honda |
| Third | (Netherlands) Hans Spaan | Honda |

80cc
Pole position
| Rider | (Spain) Jorge Martínez | Derbi |
| Time | 2:32.160 | |
Fastest lap
| Rider | (Germany) Peter Öttl | Krauser |
| Time | 2:33.980 | |
Podium
| First | (Spain) Jorge Martínez | Derbi |
| Second | (Germany) Peter Öttl | Krauser |
| Third | (Netherlands) Bert Smit | Krauser |

Sidecar (B2A)
Pole position
| Rider | (Switzerland) Rolf Biland | LCR-Krauser |
| Passenger | (Switzerland) Kurt Waltisperg | |
Fastest lap
| Rider | (Switzerland) Rolf Biland | LCR-Krauser |
| Passenger | (Switzerland) Kurt Waltisperg | |
| Time | 2:17.350 | |
Podium
| First rider | (Switzerland) Rolf Biland | LCR-Krauser |
| First passenger | (Switzerland) Kurt Waltisperg | |
| Second rider | (Netherlands) Egbert Streuer | LCR-Yamaha |
| Second passenger | (Netherlands) Bernard Schnieders | |
| Third rider | (United Kingdom) Steve Webster | LCR-Krauser |
| Third passenger | (United Kingdom) Tony Hewitt | |

The 1988 Dutch TT was the eighth round of the 1988 Grand Prix motorcycle racing season. It took place on the weekend of 23–25 June 1988 at the TT Circuit Assen located in Assen, Netherlands.

== 500 cc race report ==
Christian Sarron on pole, but dropped to the back after a terrible start. Through the first turn it was Eddie Lawson, Pierfrancesco Chili, Ron Haslam, Didier De Radiguès, Wayne Gardner, et al.

Haslam ran wide and rode off into the grass.

Through the chicane at the end of the first lap, it was Lawson, De Radiguès, Chili, Gardner, Kevin Magee, Rob McElnea, Randy Mamola, Patrick Igoa, Sarron and Wayne Rainey.

There was a small gap from Lawson to De Radiguès to Gardner.

Gardner caught De Radiguès and started to bridge up to Lawson.

De Radiguès slid out but remounted. Sarron and Magee fought for 3rd.

Approaching back markers, Gardner passed Lawson.

== 500 cc classification ==
| Pos. | Rider | Team | Manufacturer | Time/Retired | Points |
|---|---|---|---|---|---|
| 1 | (Australia) Wayne Gardner | Rothmans Honda Team | Honda | 44:15.490 | 20 |
| 2 | (United States) Eddie Lawson | Marlboro Yamaha Team Agostini | Yamaha | +11.310 | 17 |
| 3 | (France) Christian Sarron | Sonauto Gauloises Blondes Yamaha Mobil 1 | Yamaha | +19.730 | 15 |
| 4 | (Australia) Kevin Magee | Team Lucky Strike Roberts | Yamaha | +24.240 | 13 |
| 5 | (United Kingdom) Niall Mackenzie | Team HRC | Honda | +29.430 | 11 |
| 6 | (Italy) Pierfrancesco Chili | HB Honda Gallina Team | Honda | +38.780 | 10 |
| 7 | (United States) Wayne Rainey | Team Lucky Strike Roberts | Yamaha | +41.640 | 9 |
| 8 | (United States) Kevin Schwantz | Suzuki Pepsi Cola | Suzuki | +42.310 | 8 |
| 9 | (France) Patrick Igoa | Sonauto Gauloises Blondes Yamaha Mobil 1 | Yamaha | +48.990 | 7 |
| 10 | (United Kingdom) Rob McElnea | Suzuki Pepsi Cola | Suzuki | +53.280 | 6 |
| 11 | (Japan) Shunji Yatsushiro | Rothmans Honda Team | Honda | +1:22.750 | 5 |
| 12 | (Belgium) Didier de Radiguès | Marlboro Yamaha Team Agostini | Yamaha | +1:41.260 | 4 |
| 13 | (United Kingdom) Ron Haslam | Team ROC Elf Honda | Elf Honda | +1:53.410 | 3 |
| 14 | (Italy) Marco Papa | Team Greco | Honda | +1 Lap | 2 |
| 15 | (Switzerland) Marco Gentile | Fior Marlboro | Fior | +1 Lap | 1 |
| 16 | (Italy) Fabio Biliotti | Team Amoranto | Honda | +1 Lap | |
| 17 | (Switzerland) Bruno Kneubühler | Romer Racing Suisse | Honda | +1 Lap | |
| 18 | (Spain) Daniel Amatriain | Ducados Lotus Guarz | Honda | +1 Lap | |
| 19 | (West Germany) Michael Rudroff | | Honda | +1 Lap | |
| 20 | (Republic of Ireland) Eddie Laycock | Millar Racing | Honda | +1 Lap | |
| 21 | (Austria) Josef Doppler | MRC Grieskirchen | Honda | +1 Lap | |
| 22 | (Netherlands) Kees van der Endt | Autobedrijf Koens | Honda | +1 Lap | |
| 23 | (Socialist Federal Republic of Yugoslavia) Silvio Habat | Fego Racing Team | Honda | +1 Lap | |
| Ret | (Netherlands) Maarten Duyzers | HDJ International | Honda | Retirement | |
| Ret | (Austria) Karl Truchsess | | Honda | Retirement | |
| Ret | (West Germany) Manfred Fischer | Team Hein Gericke | Honda | Retirement | |
| Ret | (Netherlands) Cees Doorakkers | Grundig-Daf Racing Team | Honda | Retirement | |
| Ret | (Netherlands) Koos van Leyen | Racepromotion Venhuizen | Suzuki | Retirement | |
| Ret | (Luxembourg) Andreas Leuthe | | Suzuki | Retirement | |
| Ret | (United States) Randy Mamola | Cagiva Corse | Cagiva | Retirement | |
| Ret | (West Germany) Petr Schleef | Schuh Racing Team | Honda | Retirement | |
| Ret | (Switzerland) Nicholas Schmassman | FMS | Honda | Retirement | |
| Ret | (Italy) Alessandro Valesi | Team Iberia | Honda | Retirement | |
| Ret | (San Marino) Fabio Barchitta | Racing Team Katayama | Honda | Retirement | |
| DNS | (West Germany) Gustav Reiner | Team Hein Gericke | Honda | Did not start | |
| DNS | (United Kingdom) Steve Manley | Gateford Motors | Suzuki | Did not start | |
| DNS | (Italy) Vittorio Scatola | Team Iberia | Paton | Did not start | |
| DNQ | (Switzerland) Wolfgang von Muralt | | Suzuki | Did not qualify | |
| DNQ | (Venezuela) Larry Moreno Vacondio | | Suzuki | Did not qualify | |
| DNQ | (Finland) Ari Ramo | | Honda | Did not qualify | |
| DNQ | (United Kingdom) Ian Pratt | | Suzuki | Did not qualify | |
| DNQ | (Netherlands) Rob Punt | Suzuki Pepsi Cola | Suzuki | Did not qualify | |
| DNQ | (Netherlands) Johan ten Napel | | Suzuki | Did not qualify | |
| DNQ | (Netherlands) Henk de Vries | | Honda | Did not qualify | |
| DNQ | (Denmark) Claus Wulff | | Honda | Did not qualify | |
| DNQ | (West Germany) Helmut Schutz | Rallye Sport | Honda | Did not qualify | |
| DNQ | (Italy) Massimo Broccoli | Cagiva Corse | Cagiva | Did not qualify | |

| Previous race: 1988 Austrian Grand Prix | FIM Grand Prix World Championship; 1988 season | Next race: 1988 Belgian Grand Prix |
| Previous race: 1987 Dutch TT | Dutch TT | Next race: 1989 Dutch TT |
