= 1988 Austrian motorcycle Grand Prix =

(Austria) 1988 Austrian Grand Prix
Race details
- Race 7 of 15 races in the 1988 Grand Prix motorcycle racing season
- Date: 12 June 1988
- Official name: Großer Preis von Österreich
- Location: Salzburgring
- Course: Permanent racing facility; 4.246 km (2.638 mi)

500cc
Pole position
Rider	(France) Christian Sarron	Yamaha
Time	1:20.180	
Fastest lap
Rider	(Belgium) Didier de Radiguès	Yamaha
Time	1:20.610	
Podium
First	(United States) Eddie Lawson	Yamaha
Second	(Belgium) Didier de Radiguès	Yamaha
Third	(United States) Wayne Rainey	Yamaha

250cc
Pole position
Rider	(Switzerland) Jacques Cornu	Honda
Time	1:25.190	
Fastest lap
Rider	(Switzerland) Jacques Cornu	Honda
Time	1:24.820	
Podium
First	(Switzerland) Jacques Cornu	Honda
Second	(Germany) Reinhold Roth	Honda
Third	(Spain) Juan Garriga	Yamaha

125cc
Pole position
Rider	(Spain) Jorge Martínez	Derbi
Time	1:33.270	
Fastest lap
Rider	(Netherlands) Hans Spaan	Honda
Time	1:33.510	
Podium
First	(Spain) Jorge Martínez	Derbi
Second	(Italy) Ezio Gianola	Honda
Third	(Germany) Stefan Prein	Honda

Sidecar (B2A)
Pole position
Rider	(Switzerland) Rolf Biland	LCR-Krauser
Passenger	(Switzerland) Kurt Waltisperg	
Fastest lap
Rider	(Switzerland) Rolf Biland	LCR-Krauser
Passenger	(Switzerland) Kurt Waltisperg	
Podium
First rider	(Switzerland) Rolf Biland	LCR-Krauser
First passenger	(Switzerland) Kurt Waltisperg	
Second rider	(France) Alain Michel	LCR-Krauser
Second passenger	(France) Jean-Marc Fresc	
Third rider	(United Kingdom) Steve Webster	LCR-Krauser
Third passenger	(United Kingdom) Tony Hewitt	

The 1988 Austrian motorcycle Grand Prix was the seventh round of the 1988 Grand Prix motorcycle racing season. It took place on the weekend of 10–12 June 1988 at the Salzburgring.

== 500 cc race report ==
Christian Sarron on pole, then Eddie Lawson, Niall Mackenzie, Kevin Schwantz and Wayne Gardner.

Gardner got the first turn from Lawson, Rainey, Ron Haslam, Schwantz, et al.

Didier De Radiguès moved up to 4th and the field started to get strung out. Schwantz gave Ron Haslam a little bump as he passed and Sarron crashed out.

Lawson and Gardner swapped the lead, allowing Rainey and De Radiguès to close.

De Radiguès put pressure on Lawson his teammate in 2nd, and Rainey seemed to be dropping away.

Lawson and Gardner drop De Radiguès.

Gardner crashes out of 2nd spot.

== 500cc classification ==
Pos.	Rider	Team	Manufacturer	Time/Retired	Points
1	(United States) Eddie Lawson	Marlboro Yamaha Team Agostini	Yamaha	39:40.630	20
2	(Belgium) Didier de Radiguès	Marlboro Yamaha Team Agostini	Yamaha	+2.790	17
3	(United States) Wayne Rainey	Team Lucky Strike Roberts	Yamaha	+12.550	15
4	(United States) Kevin Schwantz	Suzuki Pepsi Cola	Suzuki	+13.590	13
5	(Italy) Pierfrancesco Chili	HB Honda Gallina Team	Honda	+19.310	11
6	(Australia) Kevin Magee	Team Lucky Strike Roberts	Yamaha	+22.070	10
7	(Japan) Shunji Yatsushiro	Rothmans Honda Team	Honda	+26.830	9
8	(United Kingdom) Ron Haslam	Team ROC Elf Honda	Elf Honda	+59.450	8
9	(United Kingdom) Rob McElnea	Suzuki Pepsi Cola	Suzuki	+1:00.370	7
10	(France) Patrick Igoa	Sonauto Gauloises Blondes Yamaha Mobil 1	Yamaha	+1:07.660	6
11	(West Germany) Gustav Reiner	Team Hein Gericke	Honda	+1 Lap	5
12	(Switzerland) Bruno Kneubühler	Romer Racing Suisse	Honda	+1 Lap	4
13	(Italy) Fabio Biliotti	Team Amoranto	Honda	+1 Lap	3
14	(Italy) Massimo Broccoli	Cagiva Corse	Cagiva	+1 Lap	2
15	(West Germany) Manfred Fischer	Team Hein Gericke	Honda	+1 Lap	1
16	(Luxembourg) Andreas Leuthe		Suzuki	+1 Lap	
17	(West Germany) Franz Holzmeier		Honda	+1 Lap	
18	(Austria) Josef Doppler	MRC Grieskirchen	Honda	+1 Lap	
19	(Switzerland) Nicholas Schmassman	FMS	Honda	+1 Lap	
20	(West Germany) Georg Robert Jung	Weigl Telefix Racing Team	Honda	+1 Lap	
21	(West Germany) Helmut Schutz	Rallye Sport	Honda	+1 Lap	
Ret	(Italy) Alessandro Valesi	Team Iberia	Honda	Retirement	
Ret	(Venezuela) Larry Moreno Vacondio		Suzuki	Retirement	
Ret	(United States) Randy Mamola	Cagiva Corse	Cagiva	Retirement	
Ret	(Switzerland) Christopher Burki		Honda	Retirement	
Ret	(Italy) Marco Papa	Team Greco	Honda	Retirement	
Ret	(Switzerland) Marco Gentile	Fior Marlboro	Fior	Retirement	
Ret	(France) Christian Sarron	Sonauto Gauloises Blondes Yamaha Mobil 1	Yamaha	Retirement	
Ret	(Spain) Daniel Amatriain	Ducados Lotus Guarz	Honda	Retirement	
Ret	(Australia) Wayne Gardner	Rothmans Honda Team	Fior	Retirement	
Ret	(United Kingdom) Niall Mackenzie	Team HRC	Honda	Retirement	
DNS	(Socialist Federal Republic of Yugoslavia) Silvo Habat	Fego Racing Team	Honda	Did not start	

Previous race: 1988 German Grand Prix	FIM Grand Prix World Championship; 1988 season	Next race: 1988 Dutch TT
Previous race: 1987 Austrian Grand Prix	Austrian Grand Prix	Next race: 1989 Austrian Grand Prix
