= 1988 German motorcycle Grand Prix =

(West Germany) 1988 German Grand Prix
Race details
- Race 6 of 15 races in the 1988 Grand Prix motorcycle racing season
- Date: 29 May 1988
- Official name: Grosser Preis von Deutschland
- Location: Nürburgring
- Course: Permanent racing facility; 4.542 km (2.822 mi)

500cc
Pole position
Rider	(Australia) Wayne Gardner	Honda
Time	1:41.310	
Fastest lap
Rider	(United States) Kevin Schwantz	Suzuki
Time	1:59.080	
Podium
First	(United States) Kevin Schwantz	Suzuki
Second	(United States) Wayne Rainey	Yamaha
Third	(France) Christian Sarron	Yamaha

250cc
Pole position
Rider	(France) Thierry Rapicault	Fior-Rotax
Time	1:51.940	
Fastest lap
Rider	(Spain) Juan Garriga	Yamaha
Time	1:56.620	
Podium
First	(Italy) Luca Cadalora	Yamaha
Second	(Spain) Sito Pons	Honda
Third	(Spain) Juan Garriga	Yamaha

125cc
Pole position
Rider	(Netherlands) Hans Spaan	Honda
Time	1:54.490	
Fastest lap
Rider	(West Germany) Alfred Waibel	Honda
Time	2:10.092	
Podium
First	(Italy) Ezio Gianola	Honda
Second	(Spain) Julián Miralles	Honda
Third	(Netherlands) Hans Spaan	Honda

80cc
Pole position
Rider	(Spain) Jorge Martínez	Derbi
Time	1:57.720	
Fastest lap
Rider	(Spain) Jorge Martínez	Derbi
Podium
First	(Spain) Jorge Martínez	Derbi
Second	(Spain) Àlex Crivillé	Derbi
Third	(Spain) Manuel Herreros	Derbi

Sidecar (B2A)
Pole position
Rider	(Switzerland) Rolf Biland	LCR-Krauser
Passenger	(Switzerland) Kurt Waltisperg	
Fastest lap
Rider	(Switzerland) Rolf Biland	LCR-Krauser
Passenger	(Switzerland) Kurt Waltisperg	
Time	1:45.550	
Podium
First rider	(Switzerland) Rolf Biland	LCR-Krauser
First passenger	(Switzerland) Kurt Waltisperg	
Second rider	(United Kingdom) Steve Webster	LCR-Krauser
Second passenger	(United Kingdom) Tony Hewitt	
Third rider	(Switzerland) Alfred Zurbrügg	LCR-Yamaha
Third passenger	(Switzerland) Martin Zurbrügg	

The 1988 German motorcycle Grand Prix was the sixth round of the 1988 Grand Prix motorcycle racing season. It took place on the weekend of 27–29 May, 1988 at the Nürburgring circuit.

== 500 cc Race report ==
The race was held in wet conditions, with Wayne Gardner starting from the pole position. Wayne Rainey took the first turn from Eddie Lawson, Pierfrancesco Chili, Christian Sarron, Kevin Schwantz (from the second row).

Sarron, considered a good wet rider, took the lead. At the end of lap one it was Sarron, Schwantz, Lawson, Kevin Magee, Rainey, and Chili. Schwantz moved into first, then it was Sarron, Magee, Lawson, and Rainey. Schwantz had a large lead. Magee went down. The track was drying slightly. Heading towards the last lap, Schwantz was looking ragged going through a chicane, but he held it together to the line.

== 500 cc classification ==
Pos.	Rider	Team	Manufacturer	Time/Retired	Points
1	(United States) Kevin Schwantz	Suzuki Pepsi Cola	Suzuki	1'01:52.270	20
2	(United States) Wayne Rainey	Team Lucky Strike Roberts	Yamaha	+25.030	17
3	(France) Christian Sarron	Sonauto Gauloises Blondes Yamaha Mobil 1	Yamaha	+51.550	15
4	(United States) Eddie Lawson	Marlboro Yamaha Team Agostini	Yamaha	+1:08.740	13
5	(Australia) Kevin Magee	Team Lucky Strike Roberts	Yamaha	+1:12.170	11
6	(Italy) Pierfrancesco Chili	HB Honda Gallina Team	Honda	+1:12.550	10
7	(Belgium) Didier de Radiguès	Marlboro Yamaha Team Agostini	Yamaha	+1:20.280	9
8	(Australia) Wayne Gardner	Rothmans Honda Team	Honda	+1:43.880	8
9	(United Kingdom) Niall Mackenzie	Team HRC	Honda	+1 Lap	7
10	(Japan) Shunji Yatsushiro	Rothmans Honda Team	Honda	+1 Lap	6
11	(United Kingdom) Rob McElnea	Suzuki Pepsi Cola	Suzuki	+1 Lap	5
12	(France) Patrick Igoa	Sonauto Gauloises Blondes Yamaha Mobil 1	Yamaha	+1 Lap	4
13	(West Germany) Peter Schleef	Schuh Racing Team	Honda	+2 Laps	3
14	(Italy) Marco Papa	Team Greco	Honda	+2 Laps	2
15	(West Germany) Michael Rudroff		Honda	+2 Laps	1
16	(Italy) Alessandro Valesi	Team Iberia	Honda	+2 Laps	
17	(Switzerland) Marco Gentile	Fior Marlboro	Fior	+2 Laps	
18	(Switzerland) Wolfgang von Muralt		Suzuki	+2 Laps	
19	(Netherlands) Maarten Duyzers	HDJ International	Honda	+2 Laps	
20	(Austria) Josef Doppler	MRC Grieskirchen	Honda	+2 Laps	
21	(West Germany) Helmut Schutz	Rallye Sport	Honda	+2 Laps	
22	(Finland) Ari Ramo		Honda	+2 Laps	
23	(Sweden) Peter Sköld	Team Honda Sweden	Honda	+2 Laps	
24	(Switzerland) Nicholas Schmassman	FMS	Honda	+2 Laps	
25	(Switzerland) Bruno Kneubühler	Romer Racing Suisse	Honda	+2 Laps	
Ret	(Luxembourg) Andreas Leuthe		Suzuki	Retirement	
Ret	(United States) Randy Mamola	Cagiva Corse	Cagiva	Retirement	
Ret	(West Germany) Georg Robert Jung	Weigl Telefix Racing Team	Honda	Retirement	
Ret	(West Germany) Manfred Fischer	Team Hein Gericke	Honda	Retirement	
Ret	(Spain) Daniel Amatriain	Ducados Lotus Guarz	Honda	Retirement	
Ret	(Italy) Massimo Broccoli	Cagiva Corse	Cagiva	Retirement	
Ret	(Sweden) Peter Linden	Team Honda Sweden	Honda	Retirement	
Ret	(West Germany) Hans Klingebiel		Suzuki	Retirement	
Ret	(United Kingdom) Ron Haslam	Team ROC Elf Honda	Elf Honda	Retirement	
Ret	(West Germany) Hansjoerg Butz		Honda	Retirement	
Ret	(San Marino) Fabio Barchitta	Racing Team Katayama	Honda	Retirement	
DNQ	(West Germany) Gustav Reiner	Team Hein Gericke	Honda	Did not qualify	
DNQ	(United Kingdom) Steve Manley	Gateford Motors	Suzuki	Did not qualify	
DNQ	(West Germany) Jorg Gammerschalg		Honda	Did not qualify	
DNQ	(West Germany) Alois Meyer		Honda	Did not qualify	
DNQ	(France) Rachel Nicotte	PVI Racing	Honda	Did not qualify	
DNQ	(Denmark) Claus Wulff		Honda	Did not qualify	

Previous race: 1988 Nations Grand Prix	FIM Grand Prix World Championship; 1988 season	Next race: 1988 Austrian Grand Prix
Previous race: 1987 German Grand Prix	German Grand Prix	Next race: 1989 German Grand Prix
