= 1988 United States motorcycle Grand Prix =

1988 United States Grand Prix
Race details
- Race 2 of 15 races in the 1988 Grand Prix motorcycle racing season
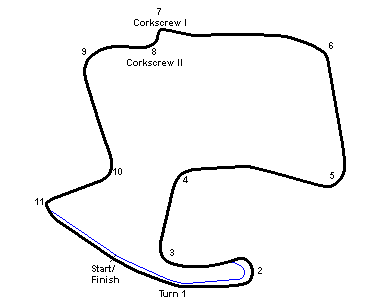
- Date: April 10, 1988
- Official name: United States International Grand Prix
- Location: Laguna Seca Raceway
- Course: Permanent racing facility; 3.563 km (2.214 mi)

500cc
Pole position
| Rider | (United States) Wayne Rainey | Yamaha |
| Time | 1:29.210 | |
Fastest lap
| Rider | (United States) Eddie Lawson | Yamaha |
| Time | 1:29.960 | |
Podium
| First | (United States) Eddie Lawson | Yamaha |
| Second | (Australia) Wayne Gardner | Honda |
| Third | (United Kingdom) Niall Mackenzie | Honda |

250cc
Pole position
| Rider | (United States) John Kocinski | Yamaha |
| Time | 1:32.950 | |
Fastest lap
| Rider | (Italy) Bruno Casanova | Aprilia-Rotax |
| Time | 1:32.320 | |
Podium
| First | (United States) Jim Filice | Honda |
| Second | (Spain) Sito Pons | Honda |
| Third | (France) Dominique Sarron | Honda |

The 1988 United States motorcycle Grand Prix was the second round of the 1988 Grand Prix motorcycle racing season. It took place on the weekend of April 8–10, 1988, at Laguna Seca Raceway.

== 500 cc race report ==
The first U.S. GP in 23 years (the Daytona in 1965 was the previous).

Wayne Rainey was on pole. Through the first hairpin it was Wayne Gardner, Niall Mackenzie, Rainey, Kevin Schwantz, et al.

Eddie Lawson was down in 6th place, with Kevin Magee and Gardner up front. Lawson worked his way through the field, and passed both Gardner and Magee on the inside of Turn 2 (hairpin).

== 500 cc classification ==
| Pos. | Rider | Team | Manufacturer | Time/Retired | Points |
|---|---|---|---|---|---|
| 1 | (United States) Eddie Lawson | Marlboro Yamaha Team Agostini | Yamaha | 1'00:48.075 | 20 |
| 2 | (Australia) Wayne Gardner | Rothmans Honda Team | Honda | +7.539 | 17 |
| 3 | (United Kingdom) Niall Mackenzie | Team HRC | Honda | +8.048 | 15 |
| 4 | (United States) Wayne Rainey | Team Lucky Strike Roberts | Yamaha | +14.638 | 13 |
| 5 | (United States) Kevin Schwantz | Suzuki Pepsi Cola | Suzuki | +27.459 | 11 |
| 6 | (France) Christian Sarron | Sonauto Gauloises Blondes Yamaha Mobil 1 | Yamaha | +1:19.207 | 10 |
| 7 | (United Kingdom) Ron Haslam | Team ROC Elf Honda | Elf Honda | +1:30.230 | 9 |
| 8 | (Belgium) Didier de Radiguès | Marlboro Yamaha Team Agostini | Yamaha | +1 Lap | 8 |
| 9 | (United Kingdom) Rob McElnea | Suzuki Pepsi Cola | Suzuki | +1 Lap | 7 |
| 10 | (United States) Mike Baldwin | Racing Team Katayama | Honda | +1 Lap | 6 |
| 11 | (Italy) Alessandro Valesi | Team Iberia | Honda | +1 Lap | 5 |
| Ret | (Japan) Shunji Yatsushiro | Rothmans Honda Team | Honda | Retirement | |
| Ret | (France) Raymond Roche | Cagiva Corse | Cagiva | Retirement | |
| Ret | (Australia) Kevin Magee | Team Lucky Strike Roberts | Yamaha | Retirement | |
| Ret | (United States) John Long | | Yamaha | Retirement | |
| Ret | (Switzerland) Marco Gentile | Fior Marlboro | Fior | Retirement | |
| Ret | (Italy) Pierfrancesco Chili | HB Honda Gallina Team | Honda | Retirement | |
| Ret | (United States) Eugene Brown | | Suzuki | Retirement | |
| DNS | (France) Patrick Igoa | Sonauto Gauloises Blondes Yamaha Mobil 1 | Yamaha | Did not start | |
| DNS | (United States) Randy Mamola | Cagiva Corse | Cagiva | Did not start | |
| DNS | (United States) William Knott | | Suzuki | Did not start | |
| DNS | (United States) Russell Bigley | | Yamaha | Did not start | |
| DNQ | (Venezuela) Larry Moreno Vacondio | | Suzuki | Did not qualify | |
| DNQ | (Republic of Ireland) Tony Carey | | Suzuki | Did not qualify | |
| DNQ | (United States) Jim Poet | | Suzuki | Did not qualify | |
| DNQ | (Italy) Fabio Barchitta | Racing Team Katayama | Honda | Did not qualify | |
| DNQ | (Italy) Vincenzo Cascino | | Honda | Did not qualify | |
| DNQ | (United States) Scott Gray | | Suzuki | Did not qualify | |
| DNQ | (United States) Freddie Spencer | | Honda | Did not qualify | |
| DNQ | (United States) David Busby | | Suzuki | Did not qualify | |

| Previous race: 1988 Japanese Grand Prix | FIM Grand Prix World Championship; 1988 season | Next race: 1988 Spanish Grand Prix |
| Previous race: 1965 United States Grand Prix | United States Grand Prix | Next race: 1989 United States Grand Prix |
