= 1990 United States motorcycle Grand Prix =

1990 United States Grand Prix
Race details
- Race 2 of 15 races in the 1990 Grand Prix motorcycle racing season
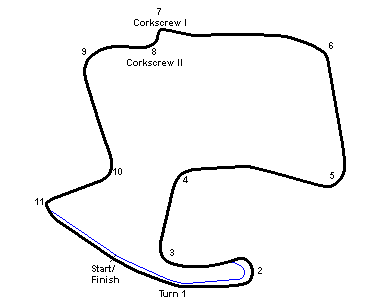
- Date: April 8, 1990
- Official name: U.S. Budweiser International Grand Prix
- Location: Laguna Seca Raceway
- Course: Permanent racing facility; 3.602 km (2.238 mi)

500cc
Pole position
- Rider: (Australia) Wayne Gardner
- Time: 1:25.908
Fastest lap
- Rider: (United States) Kevin Schwantz
- Time: 1:25.838
Podium
- First: (United States) Wayne Rainey
- Second: (Australia) Mick Doohan
- Third: (Italy) Pierfrancesco Chili

250cc
Pole position
- Rider: (Italy) Luca Cadalora
- Time: 1:28.866
Fastest lap
- Rider: (United States) John Kocinski
- Time: 1:29.178
Podium
- First: (United States) John Kocinski
- Second: (Italy) Luca Cadalora
- Third: (Netherlands) Wilco Zeelenberg

The 1990 United States motorcycle Grand Prix was the second round of the 1990 Grand Prix motorcycle racing season. It took place on the weekend of April 6–8, 1990 at Laguna Seca Raceway.

== 500 cc race report ==
Eddie Lawson's season went from bad to worse: during practice his brakes failed at speed, and he hit the straw bales hard, shattering his right ankle. He would be sidelined until round 8 at Assen.

Wayne Rainey and Kevin Schwantz both got away together at the start; Rainey's front wheel lifted, and maybe because of that, he and Schwantz touched as they headed toward the hairpin. The order as they made their way to the Corkscrew was Rainey, Schwantz, Wayne Gardner, Mick Doohan and Kevin Magee. Magee soon crashed out of the race, which was red-flagged because an ambulance needed to get on the track, Magee suffering severe head injuries and ending his season. He recovered, but never raced again at the same level.

At the new start, Schwantz got to the hairpin first, followed by Sito Pons and Rainey. Rainey soon passed Pons and a gap formed to the fight for third, between Gardner, Pons and Doohan. On the uphill approach to the Corkscrew, Gardner highsided up and out.

Commentating for Australian broadcaster Nine Network, two-time 500cc world champion Barry Sheene remarked his clear disapproval towards the safety standards at Laguna Seca after Gardner's crash:

"If the Americans are bigger and better at everything, then why don't they build a decent racetrack?"

— Barry Sheene

Rainey passed on Turn 11, and was able to keep Schwantz behind him for a lap. As they went through Turn 11 with 5 laps to go, Schwantz highsided, and injured his wrist too much to continue, which was later discovered to be a fracture.

== 500 cc classification ==
Pos.	Rider	Team	Manufacturer	Time/Retired	Points
1	(United States) Wayne Rainey	Marlboro Team Roberts	Yamaha	50:55.379	20
2	(Australia) Mick Doohan	Rothmans Honda Team	Honda	+30.386	17
3	(Italy) Pierfrancesco Chili	Team ROC Elf La Cinq	Honda	+59.233	15
4	(France) Christian Sarron	Sonauto Gauloises	Yamaha	+1:13.006	13
5	(France) Jean Philippe Ruggia	Sonauto Gauloises	Yamaha	+1:22.592	11
6	(Spain) Juan Garriga	Ducados Yamaha	Yamaha	+1 Lap	10
7	(United States) Randy Mamola	Cagiva Corse	Cagiva	+1 Lap	9
8	(Brazil) Alex Barros	Cagiva Corse	Cagiva	+1 Lap	8
9	(Sweden) Peter Lindén		Honda	+3 Laps	7
10	(Switzerland) Nicholas Schmassman	Team Schmassman	Honda	+3 Laps	6
Ret	(Australia) Kevin Magee	Lucky Strike Suzuki	Suzuki	Retirement	
Ret	(United States) Kevin Schwantz	Lucky Strike Suzuki	Suzuki	Retirement	
Ret	(Australia) Wayne Gardner	Rothmans Honda Team	Honda	Retirement	
Ret	(United Kingdom) Ron Haslam	Cagiva Corse	Cagiva	Retirement	
Ret	(Spain) Sito Pons	Campsa Banesto	Honda	Retirement	
DNS	(United States) Eddie Lawson	Marlboro Team Roberts	Yamaha	Crash in practice	
DNS	(Japan) Tadahiko Taira	Tech 21	Yamaha	Did not start	
DNQ	(Germany) Hansjorg Butz		Honda	Did not qualify	

Previous race: 1990 Japanese Grand Prix	FIM Grand Prix World Championship; 1990 season	Next race: 1990 Spanish Grand Prix
Previous race: 1989 United States Grand Prix	United States Grand Prix	Next race: 1991 United States Grand Prix
