= Carlos Cardús =

Spanish motorcycle racer

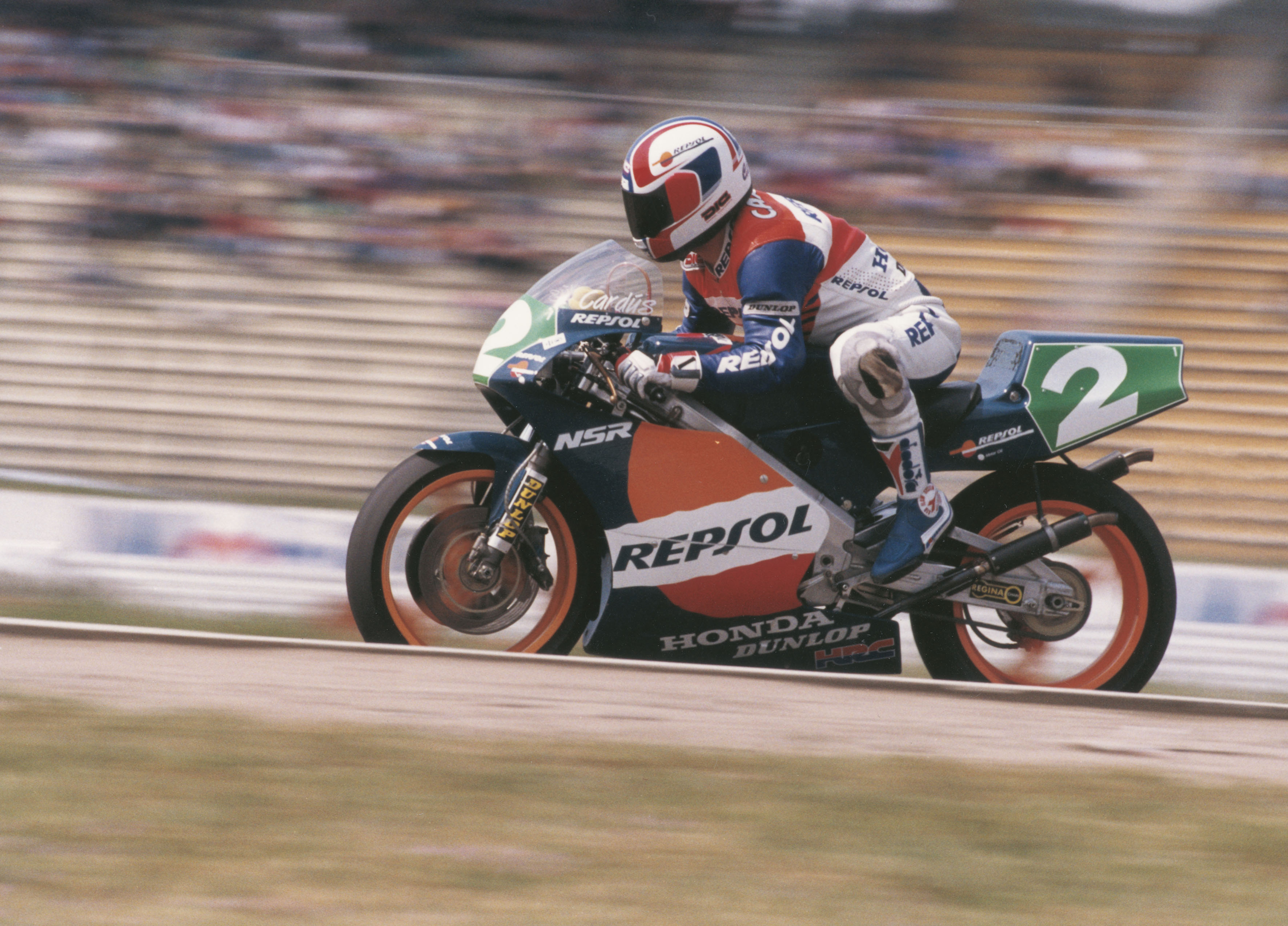
- Cardús at the 1991 German Grand Prix.
- Nationality: Spanish
Motorcycle racing career statistics
Grand Prix motorcycle racing
Active years	1983 - 1993
First race	1983 250cc South African Grand Prix
Last race	1993 250cc European Grand Prix
First win	1989 250cc French Grand Prix
Last win	1990 250cc Czechoslovak Grand Prix
Team	Honda
Championships	0
Starts / Wins / Podiums / Poles / F. laps / Points; 123 / 5 / 26 / 7 / 5 / 835

Carlos Cardús Carrió (born 26 September 1959) is a Spanish former professional motorcycle racer. He competed in Grand Prix motorcycle racing between 1975 and 1986.

Cardús was born in Barcelona, Spain on 26 September 1959. He had his best year in 1990, when he won four races and finished second in the 250cc world championship to John Kocinski in a close battle that went down to the last race of the season. In the last race of the year at Phillip Island in Australia, Cardús only needed to finish in second place behind Kocinski to win the world championship, however, his gear shift lever broke and he lost the title. He competed in the World Superbike Championship in 1994.

Cardús is the uncle of Ricard Cardús.

== Motorcycle Grand Prix Results ==
Points system from 1969 to 1987:

**Position**	1	2	3	4	5	6	7	8	9	10
**Points**	15	12	10	8	6	5	4	3	2	1

Points system from 1988 to 1992:

**Position**	1	2	3	4	5	6	7	8	9	10	11	12	13	14	15
**Points**	20	17	15	13	11	10	9	8	7	6	5	4	3	2	1

(key) (Races in bold indicate pole position; races in italics indicate fastest lap)

Year	Class	Team	1	2	3	4	5	6	7	8	9	10	11	12	13	14	15	Points	Rank	Wins
1983	250cc	Cobas-Rotax	RSA; NC	FRA; 21	NAT -	GER; 11	ESP; 9	AUT -	YUG -	NED; 16	BEL; NC	GBR; 11	SWE; NC					2	28th	0
1984	250cc	JJ Cobas	RSA -	NAT; NC	**ESP**; NC	AUT -	GER -	FRA; 7	YUG; NC	NED -	BEL; 11	GBR; NC	SWE; NC	RSM; NC				4	25th	0
1985	250cc	JJ Cobas	RSA; 6	ESP; NC	GER; 5	NAT; NC	AUT; NC	YUG; NC	NED; NC	BEL; 5	FRA; NC	GBR; NC	SWE; NC	RSM; 7				21	12th	0
1986	250cc	Campsa Honda	ESP; NC	NAT; NC	GER; 13	AUT; NC	YUG; 5	NED; NC	BEL; 6	FRA; 17	GBR; 5	SWE; 19	RSM; NC					17	12th	0
1987	250cc	Campsa Honda	JPN; NC	ESP -	GER; 4	NAT; 7	AUT; 5	YUG; NC	NED; 4	FRA; 3	GBR; 8	SWE; 6	TCH; 3	RSM; NC	POR; NC	BRA; 3	ARG; 5	70	5th	0
1988	250cc	Ducados Honda	JPN; 9	USA; NC	**ESP**; NC	EXP -	NAT -	GER -	AUT; NC	NED; 12	BEL; 7	YUG; 8	FRA; 8	GBR; 12	SWE; 5	TCH; 5	BRA; 7	71	9th	0
1989	250cc	Repsol Honda	JPN; 8	AUS; 7	USA; 5	ESP; 5	NAT; 4	GER; 6	AUT; 6	YUG; 6	NED; 4	BEL; 3	FRA; 1	GBR; NC	**SWE**; 4	TCH; 8	BRA; 5	162	4th	1
1990	250cc	Repsol Honda	JPN; 2	USA; 6	ESP; 4	NAT; 4	GER; 2	**AUT**; NC	YUG; 1	**NED**; 2	BEL; 3	**FRA**; 1	GBR; 5	SWE; 1	TCH; 1	HUN; 3	AUS; NC	208	2nd	4
1991	250cc	Repsol Honda	JPN; 2	AUS; 3	USA; 4	ESP; 6	ITA; 6	GER; 2	AUT; 2	EUR; 3	NED; 5	FRA; 3	GBR; 2	RSM; 2	TCH; 2	VDM; 2	**MAL**; 2	205	3rd	0
1992	250cc	Repsol Honda	JPN; NC	AUS; 2	MAL; 4	ESP; 5	ITA; 7	EUR; NC	GER -	NED -	HUN; DNS	FRA; 5	GBR; 8	BRA -	RSA -			48	8th	0
1993	250cc	Honda	AUS; 6	MAL; 18	JPN; NC	ESP -	AUT -	GER; 9	NED; NC	EUR; 6	RSM -	GBR -	CZE -	ITA -	USA -	FIM -		27	18th	0

Sporting positions
Preceded by (Germany) Reinhold Roth	250 cc motorcycle European Champion; 1983	Succeeded by (United Kingdom) Gary Noel
