= Dominique Sarron =

French motorcycle racer

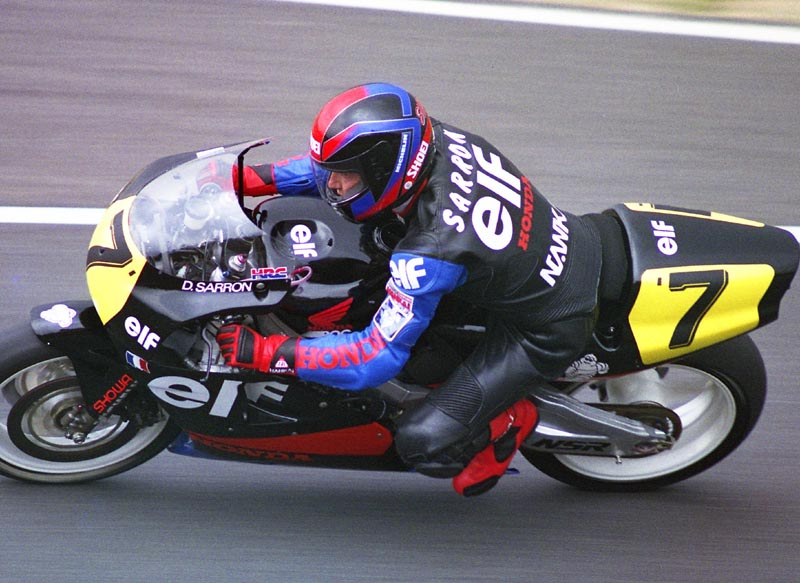
- Sarron at the 1989 Japanese Grand Prix
- Nationality: French
- Born: 27 August 1959 (age 67); Riom, France
Motorcycle racing career statistics
Grand Prix motorcycle racing
Active years	1985 - 1992
First race	1985 250cc German Grand Prix
Last race	1992 500cc South African Grand Prix
First win	1986 250cc British Grand Prix
Last win	1988 250cc Brazilian Grand Prix
Team	Honda
Starts / Wins / Podiums / Poles / F. laps / Points; 85 / 4 / 16 / 7 / 3 / 431

Dominique Sarron (born 27 August 1959 in Riom, Puy-de-Dôme) is a former Grand Prix motorcycle road racer from France. His best year was in 1986, when he won the Brazilian Grand Prix and finished in third place in the 250cc world championship behind Carlos Lavado and Sito Pons. He won two races in 1988 riding for Honda and ended the season ranked fourth.

After his Grand Prix career, Sarron competed in the 1993 Superbike World Championship. He also competed in motorcycle endurance racing. He won the Suzuka 8 Hours in 1986 partnered with Wayne Gardner ( ebenfalls in 1986 Teilnahme bei den 1000 km von Hockenheim / Germany auf Rothmans Honda RVF750 ) *Rennen war 1986 im WM Kalender. And in 1989 partnered with Alex Vieira. He is the younger brother of Christian Sarron, also a Grand Prix motorcycle racer. In 1994, he teamed up with his brother to win the prestigious Bol d'or endurance race.

== Motorcycle Grand Prix Results ==
Points system from 1969 to 1987:

**Position**	1	2	3	4	5	6	7	8	9	10
**Points**	15	12	10	8	6	5	4	3	2	1

Points system from 1988 to 1992:

**Position**	1	2	3	4	5	6	7	8	9	10	11	12	13	14	15
**Points**	20	17	15	13	11	10	9	8	7	6	5	4	3	2	1

(key) (Races in bold indicate pole position; races in italics indicate fastest lap)

Year	Class	Team	Machine	1	2	3	4	5	6	7	8	9	10	11	12	13	14	15	Points	Rank	Wins
1985	250cc	Rothmans-Honda France	RS250	RSA -	ESP -	GER; 27	NAT; 15	AUT; 18	YUG; 15	NED; NC	BEL; 8	FRA; 9	GBR; 13	SWE; 16	RSM; 9				7	21st	0
1986	250cc	Rothmans-Honda France	NSR250	ESP; 16	NAT; 7	GER; 11	AUT; 6	YUG; 3	NED; 7	BEL; 4	FRA; 3	GBR; 1	SWE; 5	RSM; 3					72	3rd	1
1987	250cc	Rothmans-Honda France	NSR250	JPN; NC	ESP; 4	GER; NC	NAT; 3	AUT; 7	YUG; 6	NED -	**FRA**; 2	GBR; 9	SWE; 5	**CZE**; 2	RSM; 4	POR; 8	**BRA**; 1	ARG; 2	97	4th	1
1988	250cc	Rothmans-Honda France	NSR250	JPN; NC	USA; 3	ESP; NC	EXP; 4	**NAT**; 1	GER; 9	AUT; 4	**NED**; NC	BEL; NC	YUG; 3	**FRA**; 3	GBR; 2	SWE; 3	CZE; 8	**BRA**; 1	158	4th	2
1989	500cc	Elf-Honda	NSR500	JPN; 18	AUS; 10	USA; 10	ESP; 9	NAT; DNS	GER; 8	AUT; 10	YUG; 10	NED -	BEL -	FRA -	GBR; NC	SWE -	CZE -	BRA; NC	39	15th	0
1990	250cc	Rothmans-Honda	NSR250	JPN; 4	USA; 5	ESP; NC	NAT; NC	GER -	AUT; 8	YUG -	NED -	BEL -	FRA; NC	GBR; 4	SWE; 10	CZE; 5	HUN; 6	AUS; 10	78	10th	0
1991	250cc	Gallina-Yamaha	TZ250	JPN -	AUS -	USA -	ESP; NC	ITA -	GER; 16	AUT -	EUR; 12	NED -	FRA -	GBR -	RSM -	CZE -	VDM -	MAL -	4	30th	0
1992	500cc	Banco-Yamaha	ROC Yamaha	JPN -	AUS; 15	MAL -	ESP; 15	ITA; 17	EUR; 17	GER; 13	NED; NC	HUN; 15	FRA; NC	GBR; 9	BRA; 13	RSA; 17			2	23rd	0

== Career statistics ==
=== FIM Endurance World Championship ===
Year	Bike	Rider	TC
1984	Honda RC45	(France) Guy Bertin (France) Dominique Sarron	2nd

=== Suzuka 8 Hours results ===
Year	Team	Co-Rider	Bike	Pos
1986	(Japan) Team HRC	(Australia) Wayne Gardner (France) Dominique Sarron	Honda RVF750 RC45	1st
1989	(Japan) Beams Honda with Ikuzawa	(France) Dominique Sarron (France) Alex Vieira	Honda RVF750 RC45	1st
