= Joan Garriga (motorcyclist) =

Spanish motorcycle racer

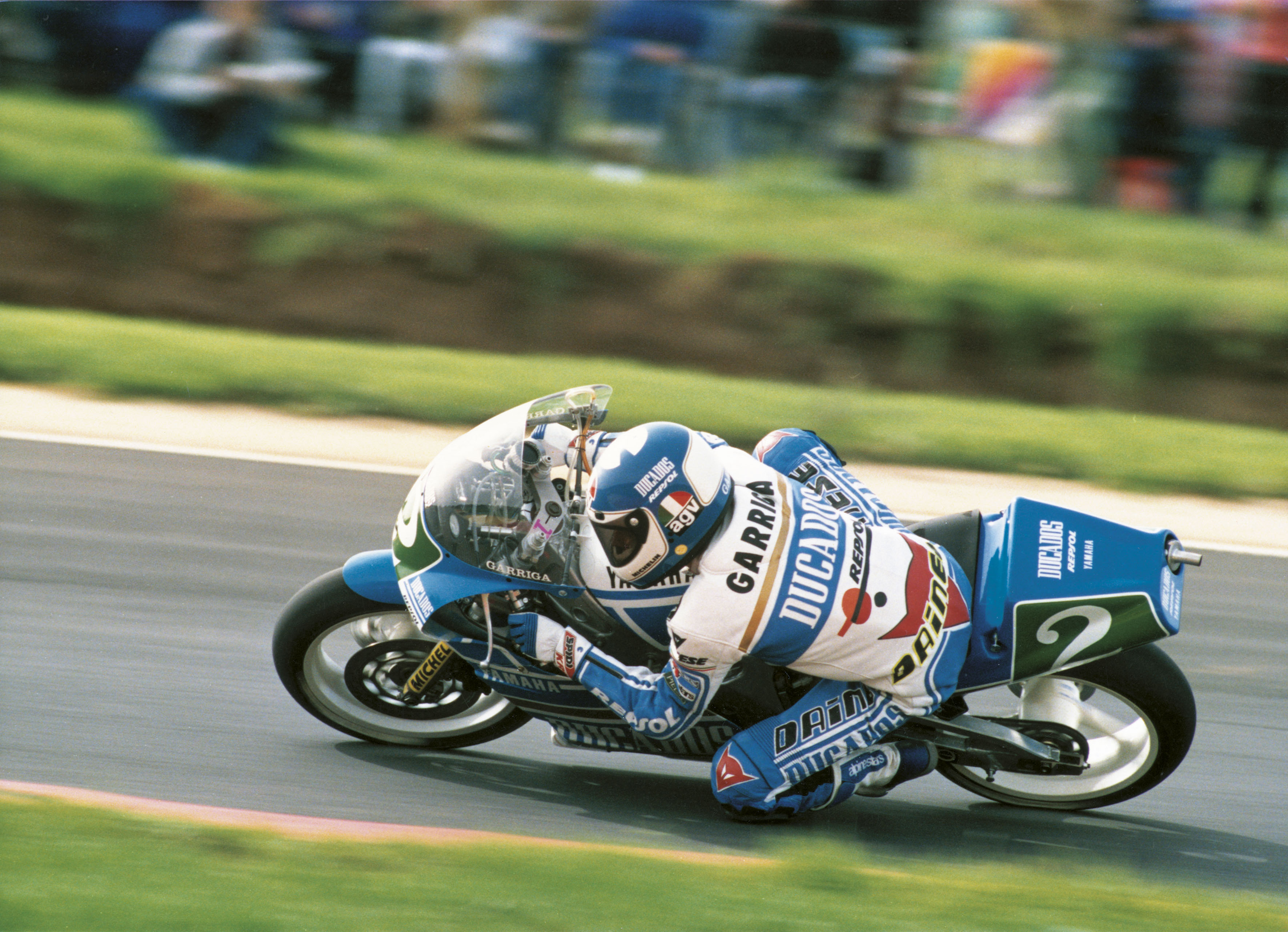
- Garriga at the 1989 Australian Grand Prix.
- Nationality: Spanish
Motorcycle racing career statistics
Grand Prix motorcycle racing
Active years	1984–1993
First race	1984 250cc Yugoslavian Grand Prix
Last race	1993 500cc European Grand Prix
First win	1988 250cc Expo 92 Grand Prix
Last win	1988 250cc Czechoslovak Grand Prix
Team	Yamaha
Starts / Wins / Podiums / Poles / F. laps / Points; 108 / 3 / 13 / 2 / 11 / 687
Superbike World Championship
Active years	1993
Manufacturers	Ducati
Starts / Wins / Podiums / Poles / F. laps / Points; 8 / 0 / 1 / 0 / 0 / 71

Joan Garriga Vilaresau (29 March 1963 – 27 August 2015) was a Spanish Grand Prix motorcycle road racer. He was known for his aggressive riding style. Together with Sito Pons, he helped to forge the path for Spanish riders in the World Championship’s premier class.

Garriga had his best year in 1988, when he won three races and finished second in the 250cc world championship to Pons. In 1990, he moved up to the 500cc class but failed to repeat his successes in the 250 class. He also competed in the Superbike World Championship in 1993.

In 1998, Garriga was arrested for drug trafficking and possessing illegal weapons, and ultimately sentenced to two years' imprisonment, suspended. Court-obtained medical records showed that he had been regularly taking drugs during his motorcycle-racing career.

Garriga died due to injuries suffered in a motorcycle road accident in August 2015.

== Motorcycle Grand Prix results ==
Points system from 1969 to 1987:

**Position**	1	2	3	4	5	6	7	8	9	10
**Points**	15	12	10	8	6	5	4	3	2	1

Points system from 1988 to 1992:

**Position**	1	2	3	4	5	6	7	8	9	10	11	12	13	14	15
**Points**	20	17	15	13	11	10	9	8	7	6	5	4	3	2	1

(key) (Races in bold indicate pole position; races in italics indicate fastest lap)

Year	Class	Team	1	2	3	4	5	6	7	8	9	10	11	12	13	14	15	Points	Rank	Wins
1984	250cc	Yamaha	RSA -	NAT -	ESP -	AUT -	GER -	FRA -	YUG; 14	NED -	BEL -	GBR -	SWE -	RSM -				0	-	0
1985	250cc	JJ Cobas	RSA; NC	ESP; 18	GER; NC	NAT; 11	AUT; 7	YUG; NC	NED -	BEL; 7	FRA; 11	GBR; 20	SWE; 14	RSM; 14				8	18th	0
1986	500cc	Cagiva	ESP; 8	NAT; NC	GER; NC	AUT; NC	YUG; 12	NED; 10	BEL; NC	FRA; 20	GBR; NC	SWE -	RSM; NC					4	17th	0
1987	250cc	Ducados-Yamaha	JPN; 6	ESP; 3	GER; 8	NAT; NC	AUT; 11	YUG; 9	NED; 8	FRA -	GBR -	SWE -	TCH; 9	RSM; 7	**POR**; 2	BRA; 10	ARG; 7	46	11th	0
1988	250cc	Ducados-Yamaha	JPN; 6	USA; 10	ESP; 2	EXP; 1	NAT; 3	GER; 3	AUT; 3	NED; 1	BEL; 6	YUG; 2	FRA; 4	**GBR**; 3	SWE; 2	TCH; 1	BRA; 5	221	2nd	3
1989	250cc	Ducados-Yamaha	JPN; 10	AUS; 4	USA; NC	ESP; 4	NAT; NC	GER; 8	AUT; NC	YUG; 5	NED; NC	BEL; 7	FRA; 8	GBR; 6	SWE; 10	TCH; 7	BRA; 11	98	8th	0
1990	500cc	Ducados-Yamaha	JPN; 10	USA; 6	ESP; 9	NAT; 8	GER; 7	AUT; 9	YUG; NC	NED; 6	BEL; 9	FRA; 8	GBR; 7	SWE; 8	TCH; 5	HUN; 5	AUS; 6	121	6th	0
1991	500cc	Ducados-Yamaha	JPN; 7	AUS; NC	USA; 8	ESP; 4	ITA; 8	GER; 7	AUT; 6	EUR; 6	NED; 12	FRA; 11	GBR; 9	RSM; 7	TCH; 6	VDM; 6	MAL; 4	121	7th	0
1992	500cc	Ducados-Yamaha	JPN; 12	AUS; 9	MAL; 4	ESP; 7	ITA; 6	EUR; 10	GER; 9	NED; 4	HUN; 8	FRA; 4	GBR; 3	BRA; NC	RSA; 10			61	7th	0
1993	500cc	Cagiva	AUS -	MAL -	JPN -	ESP -	AUT -	GER -	NED -	EUR; 9	RSM -	GBR -	CZE -	ITA -	USA -	FIM -		7	25th	0
