= Mike Baldwin (motorcyclist) =

American motorcycle racer

- Nationality: American
Motorcycle racing career statistics
Grand Prix motorcycle racing
Active years	1979, 1981, 1985 - 1988
First race	1979 500cc Austrian Grand Prix
Last race	1988 500cc British Grand Prix
Team	Yamaha
Championships	0
Starts / Wins / Podiums / Poles / F. laps / Points; 37 / 0 / 6 / 1 / 1 / 133

Mike Baldwin (born January 15, 1955, in Pasadena, California) is an American former professional motorcycle road racer. He was a top contender in AMA Superbike racing during the 1980s who also competed in Grand Prix motorcycle racing. Baldwin was inducted into the AMA Motorcycle Hall of Fame in 2001.

Baldwin led the American team to an upset win over the favored British team when he was the highest points scorer at the 1979 Transatlantic Trophy match races. The Transatlantic Trophy match races pitted the best British riders against the top American road racers on 750cc motorcycles in a six-race series in England. Baldwin won five AMA Formula 1 titles as well as becoming the first rider to win three Suzuka 8 Hours races.

Baldwin's best finish in the 500cc world championships was a fourth place in the 1986 season while racing for the Kenny Roberts-Yamaha team. He seemed poised to become one of the top American road racers, but injuries curtailed his career. He rode a Bimota at the WSBK Championship in 1989, scoring a podium finish in France.

In 2001, Baldwin was inducted into the AMA Motorcycle Hall of Fame.

== Grand Prix career statistics ==
Points system from 1969 to 1987:

**Position**	1	2	3	4	5	6	7	8	9	10
**Points**	15	12	10	8	6	5	4	3	2	1

Points system from 1988 to 1992:

**Position**	1	2	3	4	5	6	7	8	9	10	11	12	13	14	15
**Points**	20	17	15	13	11	10	9	8	7	6	5	4	3	2	1

(key) (Races in bold indicate pole position; races in italics indicate fastest lap)

Year	Class	Team	Machine	1	2	3	4	5	6	7	8	9	10	11	12	13	14	15	Points	Rank	Wins
1979	500cc	Zago-Suzuki	RG500	VEN -	AUT; 14	GER; 10	NAT; 5	**ESP**; 3	YUG -	NED -	BEL -	SWE -	FIN -	GBR -	FRA -				17	13th	0
1981	500cc	Suzuki	RG500	AUT -	GER -	NAT -	FRA; NC	YUG -	NED -	BEL -	RSM -	GBR -	FIN -	SWE -					0	-	0
1985	500cc	Michael Baldwin Racing	NS500	RSA; 9	ESP; 7	GER; NC	NAT; 11	AUT; 7	YUG -	NED; NC	BEL; 11	FRA; 10	GBR -	SWE; 7	RSM; 8				18	11th	0
1986	500cc	Lucky Strike Yamaha	YZR500	ESP; 3	NAT; 3	GER; 3	AUT; 5	YUG; 5	NED; 3	BEL; NC	FRA; 4	GBR; 18	SWE; 3	RSM; 4					78	4th	0
1987	500cc	Lucky Strike Yamaha	YZR500	JPN; NC	ESP; NC	GER -	NAT -	AUT -	YUG -	NED -	FRA -	GBR -	SWE -	CZE -	RSM -	POR; NC	BRA; 10	ARG; 6	6	18th	0
1988	500cc	Katayama Racing Team	RS500	JPN -	USA; 10	ESP; NC	EXP -	NAT -	GER -	AUT -	NED -	BEL; 20	YUG; 14	FRA; 13	GBR; 13	SWE -	CZE -	BRA -	14	19th	0

== Suzuka 8 Hours results ==
Year	Team	Co-Rider	Bike	Pos
1978	(Japan) Yoshimura Racing	(United States) Mike Baldwin (United States) Wes Cooley	Suzuki GS1000	1st
1981	Honda France	(United States) David Aldana (United States) Mike Baldwin	Honda RS1000	1st
1984	(United States) Honda America	(United States) Fred Merkel (United States) Mike Baldwin	Honda RVF750 RC45	1st
