= 1986 Grand Prix motorcycle racing season =

Sports season

The 1986 Grand Prix motorcycle racing season was the 38th F.I.M. Road Racing World Championship season.

This would be the last season where the premier class was held only in Europe until 2020.

== Season summary ==
A second world championship for Eddie Lawson. After 1985 season, the future looked bright for Honda's Freddie Spencer. However, once the season started, he began to suffer from carpal tunnel syndrome. The talented American would never win another Grand Prix after his spectacular 1985 season. Australian Wayne Gardner stepped up to become Honda's lead rider. Randy Mamola, riding for the newly formed Kenny Roberts-Yamaha team continued to post good results and finished third in the points chase.

Venezuelan Carlos Lavado earned his second world championship for Yamaha with a strong performance. Garelli teammates Fausto Gresini and Luca Cadalora battled it out for the 125 title, each taking four wins with Cadalora coming out on top. Spain's Jorge Martinez ended Stefan Dörflinger's streak of title wins at four. Angel Nieto announced he was retiring after twenty-three years in Grand Prix racing. He continued to be competitive up to the end with a second-place finish in the Italian 125 race and a second in Spain in the 80cc class. His 90 Grand Prix victories at the time ranked him second only to Giacomo Agostini.

For 125cc and 80cc, an additional post-season event on the Hockenheimring (located in the German state of Baden-Württemberg) was designated as the Baden-Württemberg Grand Prix and counted towards the championships in these classes.

== 1986 Grand Prix season calendar ==
The following Grands Prix were scheduled to take place in 1986:

Round	Date	Grand Prix	Circuit
1	4 May	(Spain) Gran Premio de España	Circuito Permanente Del Jarama
2	18 May	(Italy) Gran Premio delle Nazioni	Autodromo Nazionale Monza
3	25 May	(Germany) Großer Preis von Deutschland	Nürburgring
4	8 June	(Austria) Großer Preis von Österreich	Salzburgring
5	15 June	(Socialist Federal Republic of Yugoslavia) Yu Grand Prix	Automotodrom Rijeka
6	28 June	(Netherlands) Dutch TT	TT Circuit Assen
7	6 July	GP of Belgium	Circuit de Spa-Francorchamps
8	20 July	Grand Prix de France	Circuit Paul Ricard
9	3 August	(United Kingdom) Shell Oils British Motorcycle Grand Prix	Silverstone Circuit
10	9 August	(Sweden) Swedish TT	Scandinavian Raceway
11	24 August	Grand Prix San Marino	Circuito Internazionale Santa Monica
12	28 September	Baden-Württemberg Grand Prix	Hockenheimring

=== Calendar changes ===
- The South African Grand Prix was boycotted due to the Apartheid policies in the country.
- The German Grand Prix moved from the Hockenheimring to the Nürburgring.
- The French Grand Prix moved from the Bugatti Circuit in Le Mans to the Paul Ricard circuit.
- The Baden-Württemberg motorcycle Grand Prix was added as a one-off race to replace the South African Grand Prix. Only the 80cc and 125cc participated in this race.

== Results and standings ==
=== Grands Prix ===
Round	Date	Race	Location	80cc winner	125cc winner	250cc winner	500cc winner	Report
1	4 May	(Spain) Spanish Grand Prix	Jarama	(Spain) Jorge Martínez	(Italy) Fausto Gresini	(Venezuela) Carlos Lavado	(Australia) Wayne Gardner	Report
2	18 May	(Italy) Italian Grand Prix	Monza	(Switzerland) Stefan Dörflinger	(Italy) Fausto Gresini	(Germany) Anton Mang	(United States) Eddie Lawson	Report
3	25 May	(Germany) German Grand Prix	Nürburgring	(Spain) Manuel Herreros	(Italy) Luca Cadalora	(Venezuela) Carlos Lavado	(United States) Eddie Lawson	Report
4	8 June	(Austria) Austrian Grand Prix	Salzburgring	(Spain) Jorge Martínez	(Italy) Luca Cadalora	(Venezuela) Carlos Lavado	(United States) Eddie Lawson	Report
5	15 June	(Socialist Federal Republic of Yugoslavia) Yugoslavian Grand Prix	Automotodrom Rijeka	(Spain) Jorge Martínez		(Spain) Sito Pons	(United States) Eddie Lawson	Report
6	28 June	(Netherlands) Dutch TT	Assen	(Spain) Jorge Martínez	(Italy) Luca Cadalora	(Venezuela) Carlos Lavado	(Australia) Wayne Gardner	Report
7	6 July	(Belgium) Belgian Grand Prix	Spa		(Italy) Domenico Brigaglia	(Spain) Sito Pons	(United States) Randy Mamola	Report
8	20 July	(France) French Grand Prix	Paul Ricard		(Italy) Luca Cadalora	(Venezuela) Carlos Lavado	(United States) Eddie Lawson	Report
9	3 August	(United Kingdom) British Grand Prix	Silverstone	(United Kingdom) Ian McConnachie	(Austria) August Auinger	(France) Dominique Sarron	(Australia) Wayne Gardner	Report
10	9 August	(Sweden) Swedish Grand Prix	Anderstorp		(Italy) Fausto Gresini	(Venezuela) Carlos Lavado	(United States) Eddie Lawson	Report
11	24 August	San Marino Grand Prix	Misano	(Italy) Pier Paolo Bianchi	(Austria) August Auinger	(Japan) Tadahiko Taira	(United States) Eddie Lawson	Report
12	28 September	Baden-Württemberg Grand Prix	Hockenheim	(Germany) Gerhard Waibel	(Italy) Fausto Gresini			Report

== Participants ==
=== 500cc participants ===
Team	Constructor	Motorcycle	No.	Rider	Rounds
Rothmans Honda/HRC	Honda	Honda NSR500	1	(United States) Freddie Spencer	1, 4
Rothmans Honda/HRC	Honda	Honda NSR500	4	(Australia) Wayne Gardner	All
Yamaha Marlboro Team Agostini SRL	Yamaha	Yamaha YZR500	2	(United States) Eddie Lawson	All
Yamaha Marlboro Team Agostini SRL	Yamaha	Yamaha YZR500	9	(United Kingdom) Rob McElnea	All
Team Gauloises Blondes Yamaha	Yamaha	Yamaha YZR500	3	(France) Christian Sarron	1–9, 11
Team Elf-ROC	Elf-Honda	Elf 3	5	(United Kingdom) Ron Haslam	All
Team Elf-ROC	Elf-Honda	Elf 3	52	(France) Christian le Liard	8–11
Team Lucky Strike Roberts	Yamaha	Yamaha YZR500	6	(United States) Randy Mamola	All
Team Lucky Strike Roberts	Yamaha	Yamaha YZR500	11	(United States) Mike Baldwin	All
Racing Team Katayama	Honda	Honda RS500; Honda NSR500	7	(France) Raymond Roche	All
Rollstar Honda Racing Team	Chevallier-Honda	Honda RS500	8	(Belgium) Didier de Radiguès	2–3, 6–11
PDM Chrome Tapes	Honda	Honda RS500	10	(Netherlands) Boet van Dulmen	All
PDM Chrome Tapes	Honda	Honda RS500	39	(Netherlands) Henk van der Mark	1–5, 9–10
??	Honda	Honda RS500	18	(Italy) Marco Papa	2, 5–6
Ecurie Fior	Fior-Honda	Fior RS500	20	(Italy) Marco Gentile	1–6, 8–11
Team Italia	Honda	Honda RS500	23	(Italy) Fabio Biliotti	1–6, 9–11
HB Suzuki	Suzuki	Suzuki RG500 XR70	26	(Zimbabwe) Dave Petersen	1–6, 8, 11
HB Suzuki	Suzuki	Suzuki RG500 XR70	28; 30; 31; 46; 56	(Italy) Pierfrancesco Chili	1–5, 7-8
Skoal Bandit Heron Suzuki	Suzuki	Suzuki RG500 TSR6 (XR70)	33	(Australia) Paul Lewis	1–8, 11
Skoal Bandit Heron Suzuki	Suzuki	Suzuki RG500 TSR6 (XR70)	47; 33; 59	(United Kingdom) Niall Mackenzie	9–11
Skoal Bandit Heron Suzuki	Suzuki	Suzuki RG500 TSR6 (XR70)	57	(United Kingdom) Paul Iddon	??
Rizla Heron Suzuki	Heron-Suzuki	Suzuki RG500 TSR6 (XR70)	34	(United States) Kevin Schwantz	6–8, 11
Rothmans Honda Britain	Honda	Honda RS500; Honda NS500	31; 30	(United Kingdom) Roger Burnett	2, 6–7, 9
Rothmans Honda Britain	Honda	Honda NS500	43	(United Kingdom) Roger Marshall	9
Duckhams Oil	Honda	Honda RS500	31	(United Kingdom) Simon Buckmaster	1–4, 6–11
Hein Gericke Racing	HG-Honda	Honda RS500	35; 31; 71; 36	(West Germany) Manfred Fischer	1–7, 9–11
Stichting Netherlands Racing Team	Honda	Honda RS500	35	(Netherlands) Mile Pajic	3–11
??	Honda	Honda RS500	37	(Luxembourg) Andy Leuthe	1–3, 5–7, 11
Loctite Suzuki	Suzuki	Suzuki RGB500	41	(United Kingdom) Kenny Irons	6, 8–9
Cagiva	Cagiva	Cagiva C10	44; 16	(Spain) Joan Garriga	1–9, 11
Cagiva	Cagiva	Cagiva C10	58	(Italy) Marco Lucchinelli	2
HRC Grieskirched	Honda	Honda RS500	44	(Austria) Sepp Doppler	??
??	Honda	Honda RS500	45	(West Germany) Dietmar Mayer	8
HDJ Sportswear	Suzuki	Suzuki RG500 XR45	48	(Netherlands) Maarten Duyzers	3, 5–10
Frankonia-Suzuki Schweiz	Suzuki	Suzuki RG500 Bakker (XR45)	51; 29	(Switzerland) Wolfgang von Muralt	All
HRC-Moriwaki	Honda	Honda NSR500	54	(Japan) Shunji Yatsushiro	4–6, 8–11
Ciesse Piumini	Suzuki	Suzuki RGB500	55	(Italy) Leandro Becheroni	1–2, 4–8, 11
Walter Wolf	Suzuki	Suzuki RG500 XR70	56; 63	(Japan) Masaru Mizutani	6–7
RS Rallye Sport Motorsport Handels	Honda	Honda RS500	56	(West Germany) Helmut Schütz	3–5, 9–10
Honda Deutschland	Honda	Honda RS500 Bakker	14	(West Germany) Gustav Reiner	1, 3–4, 6, 8
??	Honda	Honda RS500 Bakker	??	(Sweden) Peter Sköld	??

Key
Regular Rider
Wildcard Rider
Replacement Rider

=== 250cc participants ===
Team	Constructor	Motorcycle	No.	Rider	Rounds
Rothmans Honda	Honda	Honda NSR250	2	(West Germany) Anton Mang	1–3, 5–7, 9–11
Rothmans Honda	Honda	Honda NSR250	42; 55; 46; 40; 38; 31; 56	(France) Dominique Sarron	All
HB-Venemotos Racing Team	Yamaha	Yamaha YZR 250	3	(Venezuela) Carlos Lavado	All
HB-Venemotos Racing Team	Yamaha	Yamaha TZ 250	26; 28	(Venezuela) Luis Lavado	All
Yamaha Marlboro Team Agostini SRL	Yamaha	Yamaha YZR 250	4	(West Germany) Martin Wimmer	All
Yamaha Marlboro Team Agostini SRL	Yamaha	Yamaha YZR 250	57; 37; 44; 36; 33; 31	(Japan) Tadahiko Taira	2–11
MC Bielle Roventi Honda Italy	Honda	Honda NSR250	5	(Italy) Fausto Ricci	1–5, 7–11
Team Aprilia	Aprilia-Rotax	??	6	(Italy) Loris Reggiani	1–2, 6, 8–10
Team Aprilia	Aprilia-Rotax	??	36; 43; 45	(Italy) Stefano Caracchi	1–3, 8–11
Braun Cobas	JJ Cobas-Rotax	??	7	(United Kingdom) Alan Carter	All
HB-Aprilia Team 250	Aprilia-Rotax	??	8	(West Germany) Manfred Herweh	1–8
HB-Römer Racing Team	Honda	Honda RS250R	9	(West Germany) Reinhold Roth	All
HB-Römer Racing Team	Honda	Honda RS250R	25	(West Germany) Harald Eckl	1–6, 8–11
Team Parisienne-Elf	Honda	Honda RS250R	10	(Switzerland) Jacques Cornu	All
Team Parisienne-Elf	Parisienne	??	11	(France) Pierre Bolle	1–9, 11
Team Parisienne-Elf	Parisienne Honda	?? Honda RS250R	54; 67	(Switzerland) Sergio Pellandini	4
Team Parisienne-Elf	Parisienne	??	59	(France) Guy Bertin	6–7, 10
Campsa-Honda	Honda	Honda RS250R	12	(Spain) Carlos Cardús	All
Campsa-Honda	Honda	Honda NSR250	19	(Spain) Sito Pons	All
Team Mattioli	Yamaha	Yamaha TZ 250	14	(France) Jean-Michel Mattioli	1–3, 5–11
Silverstone-Armstrong	Armstrong-Rotax	Armstrong CF250	15	(United Kingdom) Donnie Mcleod	All
Silverstone-Armstrong	Armstrong-Rotax	Armstrong CF250	35; 38; 41	(United Kingdom) Niall Mackenzie	6–11
Silverstone-Armstrong	Armstrong-Rotax	Armstrong CF250	52	(United Kingdom) Ian Newton	1–3
Racing Team Katayama	Honda	Honda NSR250	17	(France) Jean-François Baldé	All
Racing Team Katayama	Honda	Honda NSR250	70; 44; 34; 51; 52	(Italy) Virginio Ferrari	3-11
Nuovo Moto Club	Honda	Honda RS250R	20	(Italy) Massimo Matteoni	2, 4–5, 8, 10–11
Team Italia Garelli	Garelli	Garelli 250 GP	21	(Italy) Andrea Brasini	??
Team Italia Garelli	Garelli	Garelli 250 GP	42; 39; 45; 34; 43; 32	(Italy) Maurizio Vitali	1, 3–11
Motor Team Development	Honda	Honda RS250R	22	(France) Bruno Bonhuil	2–3, 5, 7–8
Honda Racing Team	Honda	Honda RS250R	23	(Austria) Siegfried Minich	2–7, 9–10
Johnson Team Total	Yamaha	Yamaha TZ 250	35; 50; 32; 33	(Belgium) Stéphane Mertens	2–11
Dieter Braun PVM Levior Team	Yamaha	Yamaha TZ 250	39; 33	(West Germany) Hans Becker	4–7, 9–10
Hostettler-Yamaha	Yamaha	Yamaha TZ 250	41; 43; 47	(Switzerland) Roland Freymond	1, 3, 5, 7–11
??	Chevallier-Yamaha	Yamaha TZ 250	42; 31; 62	(France) Jean Foray	All
Werberger Konservenfabrik Koch KG	Yamaha	Yamaha TZ 250	45	(West Germany) Herbert Besendörfer	4–5, 9–10
Ehrlich Automotive	EMC-Rotax	??	46; 36; 51	(United Kingdom) Gary Noel	6–7, 11
RK	Morena-Rotax	??	49; 41	(Belgium) Rene Deláby	1–5, 9
Wintershall Racing Team	Yamaha	Yamaha TZ 250	53; 57	(Switzerland) Urs Lüzi	1, 6, 11
Atomic Road Racing Team	Bakker-Rotax	??	54; 30; 41	(Austria) Hans Lindner	2–8
MIG	MIG-Rotax	??	55; 32	(France) Jean-Louis Guignabodet	1–2, 4, 6–11
??	Yamaha	Yamaha TZ 250	63; 18; 52	(France) Jean-Louis Tournadre	1–5, 9–11

Key
Regular Rider
Wildcard Rider
Replacement Rider

=== 500cc riders' standings ===
Scoring system

Points are awarded to the top ten finishers. A rider has to finish the race to earn points.

Position	1st	2nd	3rd	4th	5th	6th	7th	8th	9th	10th
Points	15	12	10	8	6	5	4	3	2	1

Pos	Rider	Team	Machine	ESP (Spain)	NAT (Italy)	GER (Germany)	AUT (Austria)	YUG (Socialist Federal Republic of Yugoslavia)	NED (Netherlands)	BEL (Belgium)	FRA (France)	GBR (United Kingdom)	SWE (Sweden)	SMR (San Marino)	Pts
1	(United States) Eddie Lawson	Marlboro Yamaha-Agostini	YZR500	2	1	1	1	1	Ret	2	1	3	1	1	139
2	(Australia) Wayne Gardner	Rothmans Honda-HRC	NSR500	1	16	2	2	3	1	4	5	1	2	2	117
3	(United States) Randy Mamola	Lucky Strike Yamaha-Roberts	YZR500	4	2	6	3	2	2	1	2	5	8	3	105
4	(United States) Mike Baldwin	Lucky Strike Yamaha-Roberts	YZR500	3	3	3	5	5	3	Ret	4	18	3	4	78
5	(United Kingdom) Rob McElnea	Marlboro Yamaha-Agostini	YZR500	7	Ret	4	6	4	4	5	6	4	4		60
6	(France) Christian Sarron	Sonauto Gauloises-Yamaha	YZR500	5	4	Ret	4	6	5	3	3	Ret		6	58
7	(Belgium) Didier de Radiguès	Rollstar Honda Racing Team	Chevallier-NS500		5	5			9	7	8	2	6	7	42
8	(France) Raymond Roche	Racing Team Katayama	NS500/NSR500	6	Ret	7	Ret	7	6	Ret	Ret	6	5	5	35
9	(United Kingdom) Ron Haslam	Team Elf-ROC	Elf3-RS500	10	Ret	8	Ret	Ret	7	Ret	7	9	9	9	18
10	(Italy) Pierfrancesco Chili	HB-Suzuki	RG500	14	7	16	9	DNS		6	Ret	DNS			18
11	(United Kingdom) Niall Mackenzie	Skoal Bandit Heron Suzuki	RG500									7	7	8	11
12	(Netherlands) Boet Van Dulmen	PDM Chrome Tapes	RS500	15	6	13	10	13	12	9	14	12	13	18	8
13	(Japan) Shunji Yatsushiro	HRC Moriwaki	RS500				7	8	Ret			Ret	14	11	7
14	(West Germany) Gustav Reiner	Honda Deutschland	RS500	Ret		9	8		Ret		DNS				5
15	(Italy) Fabio Biliotti	Team Italia	RS500	9	8	14	11	Ret		Ret	Ret	Ret			5
16	(Zimbabwe) Dave Petersen	HB Suzuki	RG500	12	11	10	12	9	Ret		9	DNS			5
17	(Spain) Juan Garriga	Cagiva	GP500	8	Ret	DNS	Ret	12	10	20	20	Ret		NC	4
18	(Australia) Paul Lewis	Skoal Bandit Heron Suzuki	RG500	11	9	12	14	10	Ret	Ret	10	DNS			4
19	(Netherlands) Mile Pajic	Stichting Netherlands Racing Team	RS500			Ret	18	18	16	8	16	Ret	21	Ret	3
20	(United Kingdom) Kenny Irons	Loctite Yamaha	YZR500						Ret			8			3
21	(United Kingdom) Roger Burnett	Rothmans Honda Britain	RS500/NS500		Ret				8	DNS		11			3
22	(United States) Kevin Schwantz	Rizla Heron Suzuki	RG500							10				10	2
23	(Switzerland) Wolfgang Von Muralt	Frankonia Suzuki	Bakker-RG500	Ret	Ret	17	15	11	13	11	11	10	10	Ret	2
24	(Italy) Marco Papa		RS500		10			16							1
	(West Germany) Manfred Fischer	Team Hein Gericke	HG-RS500	18	14	11	13	Ret	16	Ret		19	16	Ret	0
	(Switzerland) Marco Gentile	Ecurie Fior	Fior-RS500	19	Ret	Ret	Ret	15	11		12	Ret	11		0
	(Netherlands) Henk van der Mark	PDM Chrome Tapes	RS500	14	13	15	17	Ret				15	17		0
	(Japan) Masaru Mizutani	Walter Wolf Racing	RG500						14	13					0
	(Finland) Eero Hyvarinen		RS500			Ret	21	14	Ret	DNS			19	Ret	0
	(United Kingdom) Simon Buckmaster	Duckhams Oil	RS500	17	Ret	18	19		15		17	Ret	18		0
	(Austria) Karl Truchsess		RS500		15				Ret		Ret			Ret	0
	(France) Christian Le Liard	Team Elf-ROC	Elf3-RS500								15	Ret	NC	Ret	0
	(United States) Freddie Spencer	Rothmans Honda-HRC	NSR500	Ret			16								0
	(Sweden) Peter Linden		RS500	Ret	17		Ret		DNS		Ret		12		0
	(Italy) Fabio Barchitta		RS500					17						Ret	0
	(Netherlands) Rob Punt		RS500		18	20									0
	(Italy) Alessandro Valesi		RS500		Ret				Ret		18				0
	(West Germany) Gerold Fisher		RS500			19									0
	(West Germany) Dietmar Mayer		RS500								19				0
	(Luxembourg) Andreas Leuthe		RS500	20	Ret	24		20	Ret	Ret				Ret	0
	(Italy) Leandro Becheroni		RG500	Ret	Ret		20	24	Ret	Ret	Ret			Ret	0
	(Finland) Esko Kuparinen		RS500								21		23		0
	(United Kingdom) Steve Manley		RG500									21			0
	(Netherlands) Maarten Duyzers	HDJ Sportswear	RS500			22		23	Ret	Ret	Ret		22		0
	(West Germany) Helmut Schutz	Rallye Sport	RS500			28	Ret	Ret				23			0
	(Austria) Josef Doppler	HRC Grieskirched	RS500		Ret	27	Ret	Ret	Ret	Ret					0
	(France) Philippe Robinet		RS500			29				Ret	Ret				0
	(Italy) Armando Errico		RG500		Ret			Ret							0
	(Italy) Marco Lucchinelli	Cagiva	GP500		Ret										0
	(Czechoslovakia) Bohumil Staša		RS500			Ret									0
Pos	Rider	Team	Machine	ESP (Spain)	NAT (Italy)	GER (Germany)	AUT (Austria)	YUG (Socialist Federal Republic of Yugoslavia)	NED (Netherlands)	BEL (Belgium)	FRA (France)	GBR (United Kingdom)	SWE (Sweden)	SMR (San Marino)	Pts

=== 250cc standings ===
Place	Rider	Number	Team	Machine	Points	Wins	P.Pos.	F.Laps
1	(Venezuela) Carlos Lavado	3	HB Venemotos-Yamaha	YZR250	114	6	7	3
2	(Spain) Sito Pons	19	Campsa-Honda	NSR250	108	2		2
3	(France) Dominique Sarron	42	Rothmans-Honda	NSR250	72	1		1
4	(West Germany) Anton Mang	2	Rothmans-Honda	NSR250	65	1		1
5	(France) Jean-François Baldé	17	Katayama-Honda	NSR250	63			
6	(West Germany) Martin Wimmer	4	Marlboro-Yamaha	YZR250	56		4	3
7	(Switzerland) Jacques Cornu	10	Parisienne-Elf-Honda	RS250	32			
8	(Italy) Fausto Ricci	5	MC Bielle Roventi-Honda	NSR250	30			
9	(Japan) Tadahiko Taira	57	Marlboro-Yamaha	YZR250	28	1		
10	(United Kingdom) Donnie McLeod	15	Silverstone-Armstrong	CF250	27			
11	(France) Pierre Bolle				21			
12	(Spain) Carlos Cardús	12	Campsa-Honda		17			
13	(Belgium) Stéphane Mertens				14			
14	(Italy) Virginio Ferrari	34	Total-Honda		14			
15	(Italy) Maurizio Vitali				12			
16	(Germany) Reinhold Roth	9	HB-Honda		10			
17	(United Kingdom) Alan Carter	7			9			
18	(France) Jean Michel Mattioli				9			
19	(Germany) Manfred Herweh	8	Aprilia-Rotax		7			
20	(France) Jean Foray				7			
21	(United Kingdom) Niall Mackenzie		Armstrong-Rotax	CF250	4			
22	(Austria) Siegfried Minich				4			
23	(Italy) Massimo Matteoni				2			
24	(Austria) Hans Lindner				1			

=== 125cc standings ===
Place	Rider	Number	Machine	Points	Wins
1	(Italy) Luca Cadalora	22	Garelli	122	4
2	(Italy) Fausto Gresini	1	Garelli	114	4
3	(Italy) Domenico Brigaglia	6	MBA	80	1
4	(Austria) August Auinger	3	Bartol	60	2
5	(Italy) Ezio Gianola	4	MBA	57	0
6	(Switzerland) Bruno Kneubühler	5	LCR	54	0
7	(Belgium) Lucio Pietroniro	9	MBA	37	0
8	(Italy) Pier Paolo Bianchi	2	Seel	34	0
9	(Finland) Johnny Wickström	11	Tunturi	33	0
10	(Argentina) Willy Perez	14	Zanella	26	0
11	(Belgium) Olivier Liégeois	10		21	
12	(Switzerland) Thierry Feuz	17		19	
13	(Spain) Ángel Nieto			15	
14	(Italy) Paolo Casoli			14	
15	(Italy) Gastone Grassetti			9	
16	(Finland) Jussi Hautaniemi	8		8	
17	(Germany) Adi Stadler			6	
18	(Germany) Alfred Waibel			5	
19	(Sweden) Hakan Olsson			5	
20	(Spain) Andres Sanchez			3	
21	(Austria) Mike Leitner			2	
22	(Finland) Esa Kytölä			2	

=== 80cc standings ===
Place	Rider	Number	Machine	Points	Wins
1	(Spain) Jorge Martínez	2	Derbi	94	4
2	(Spain) Manuel Herreros	4	Derbi	85	1
3	(Switzerland) Stefan Dörflinger	1	Krauser	82	1
4	(Netherlands) Hans Spaan		Huvo	57	0
5	(West Germany) Gerhard Waibel	5	Real	51	1
6	(United Kingdom) Ian McConnachie	6	Krauser	50	1
7	(Spain) Ángel Nieto	9	Derbi	45	0
8	(Italy) Pier Paolo Bianchi		Seel	44	1
9	(Austria) Josef Fischer		Krauser	13	0
10	(Austria) Gerd Kafka		Krauser	9	0
11	(Netherlands) Wilco Zeelenberg		Casal	8	
12	(Germany) Hubert Abold			8	
13	(Netherlands) Theo Timmer			6	
14	(Spain) Joan Bolart			6	
15	(Germany) Rudolf Kunz			6	
16	(Brazil) Alex Barros			6	
17	(Netherlands) Henk Van Kessel			5	
18	(Spain) Domingo Gil			5	
19	(Germany) Rainer Scheidhauer			4	
20	(Germany) Alfred Waibel			3	
21	(Spain) Felix Rodriguez			3	
22	(Spain) Luis Miguel Reyes			2	
23	(Spain) Herri Torrontegui			1	
24	(Italy) Salvatore Milano			1	
