= Simon Buckmaster =

British motorcycle racer

- Nationality: British
- Born: 15 January 1961 (age 65)
Motorcycle racing career statistics
500cc World Championship
Active years	1984–1989, 1991–1992
Manufacturers	Suzuki, Honda, Harris Yamaha
Championships	0
1992 championship position	NC (0 pts)
Starts / Wins / Podiums / Poles / F. laps / Points; 62 / 0 / 1 / 0 / 0 / 49.5
Superbike World Championship
Active years	1990
Manufacturers	Honda, Kawasaki
Championships	0
1990 championship position	NC (0 pts)
Starts / Wins / Podiums / Poles / F. laps / Points; 4 / 0 / 0 / 0 / 0 / 0

Simon Buckmaster (born 15 January 1961) is a British former professional Grand Prix motorcycle racer. He participated in 50 Grands Prix races between 1984 and 1992. His best season was in 1989 when he finished 12th in the Championship.

== Career ==
Buckmaster made his first Grand Prix appearance at the British Grand Prix at Silverstone in 1983, but failed to qualify. He returned in 1984 and qualified for the race. Buckmaster became a Grand Prix regular in 1985. Riding a privateer Suzuki he made five starts but scored no championship points. In 1986, Buckmaster switched to Honda and competed in all of the races. His best finish was 15th place at the Dutch TT. Buckmaster continued to ride a Honda in 1987 season, starting in 12 races but failing to score any points.

Buckmaster had a career-best season in 1989, when he finished 12th in the Championship. He had a career-best race at the Nations Grand Prix at Misano which most of the top riders boycotted for safety reasons, allowing Buckmaster to score his highest finish with a second behind Pierfrancesco Chili. Buckmaster competed at the highest level of Grand Prix racing until 1992.

Buckmaster was severely injured at the 1993 Bol d'Or when he collided with rider Michel Graziano. The crash ended Buckmaster's racing career as his lower left leg had to be amputated.

After his riding career, Buckmaster became a team manager, currently with the PTR Triumph factory team in the Supersport World Championship.

== Career statistics ==
=== Grand Prix motorcycle racing ===
==== Races by year ====
(key) (Races in bold indicate pole position) (Races in italics indicate fastest lap)

Year	Class	Bike	1	2	3	4	5	6	7	8	9	10	11	12	13	14	15	Pos	Pts
1983	500cc	Suzuki	RSA	FRA	NAT	GER	SPA	AUT	YUG	NED	BEL	GBR; DNQ	SWE	RSM				NC	0
1984	500cc	Suzuki	RSA	NAT	SPA	AUT	GER	FRA	YUG	NED	BEL	GBR; 22	SWE	RSM				NC	0
1985	500cc	Honda	RSA	SPA; 17	GER; Ret	NAT	AUT; 27	YUG	NED; DNQ	BEL	FRA; 17	GBR; 26	SWE; 17	RSM				NC	0
1986	500cc	Honda	SPA; 17	NAT; Ret	GER; 18	AUT; 19	YUG; DNS	NED; 15	BEL; Ret	FRA; 17	GBR; Ret	SWE; 18	RSM; Ret					NC	0
1987	500cc	Honda	JPN; 13	SPA; 15	GER; 20	NAT; DNS	AUT; 17	YUG; 16	NED; 12	FRA; 13	GBR; Ret	SWE; 17	CZE; 17	RSM; 18	POR; 14	BRA	ARG	NC	0
1988	500cc	Honda	JPN	USA	SPA	EXP	NAT	GER	AUT	NED	BEL	YUG	FRA	GBR; 23	SWE; 23	CZE; Ret	BRA	NC	0
1989	500cc	Honda	JPN; Ret	AUS; 12	USA; 13	SPA; 13	NAT; 2	GER; 14	AUT; 13	YUG; 14	NED; 19	BEL; 15	FRA; 14	GBR; 15	SWE; 12	CZE; 21	BRA; 14	12th	43.5
1991	500cc	Suzuki	JPN	AUS	USA	SPA	ITA; 14	GER; 14	AUT	EUR; Ret	NED; Ret	FRA; DNQ	GBR	RSM	CZE; 15	VDM; 15	MAL	22nd	6
1992	500cc	Harris-Yamaha	JPN; DNQ	AUS; 21	MAL; Ret	SPA; Ret	ITA; 20	EUR; Ret	GER; 17	NED; 14	HUN; DNS	FRA	GBR	BRA; Ret	RSA; Ret			NC	0

=== Superbike World Championship ===
==== Races by year ====
(key) (Races in bold indicate pole position) (Races in italics indicate fastest lap)

Year	Bike	1		2		3		4		5		6		7		8		9		10		11		12		13		Pos	Pts
Year	Bike	R1	R2	R1	R2	R1	R2	R1	R2	R1	R2	R1	R2	R1	R2	R1	R2	R1	R2	R1	R2	R1	R2	R1	R2	R1	R2	Pos	Pts
1990	Honda	SPA	SPA	GBR	GBR	HUN	HUN	GER	GER	CAN	CAN	USA	USA	AUT	AUT	JPN; Ret	JPN; 26	FRA	FRA	ITA	ITA							NC	0
1990	Kawasaki																					MAL; 17	MAL; 19	AUS	AUS	NZL	NZL	NC	0
1991	Honda	GBR; DNQ	GBR; DNQ	SPA	SPA	CAN	CAN	USA	USA	AUT	AUT	SMR	SMR	SWE	SWE	JPN	JPN	MAL	MAL	GER	GER	FRA	FRA	ITA	ITA	AUS	AUS	NC	0

=== FIM Endurance World Championship ===
Year	Bike	Rider	TC
1993	Kawasaki ZXR-7	(United Kingdom) Simon Buckmaster (United Kingdom) Steve Manley	3rd
