= 1986 Belgian motorcycle Grand Prix =

(Belgium) 1986 Belgian Grand Prix
Race details
- Race 7 of 12 races in the 1986 Grand Prix motorcycle racing season
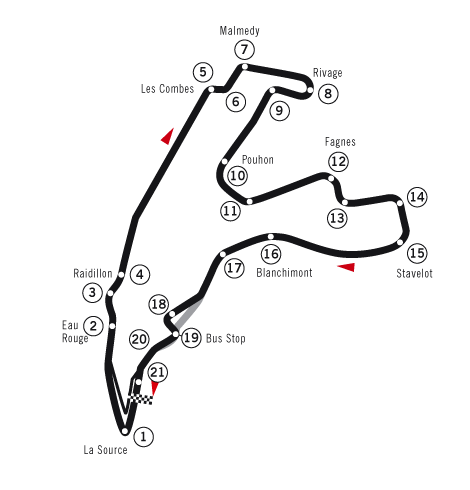
- Date: 6 July 1986
- Official name: GP of Belgium
- Location: Circuit de Spa-Francorchamps
- Course: Permanent racing facility; 6.940 km (4.312 mi)

500cc
Pole position
- Rider: (United States) Randy Mamola
- Time: 2:28.280
Fastest lap
- Rider: (United States) Randy Mamola
- Time: 2:48.990
Podium
- First: (United States) Randy Mamola
- Second: (United States) Eddie Lawson
- Third: (France) Christian Sarron

250cc
Pole position
- Rider: (Venezuela) Carlos Lavado
- Time: 2:34.340
Fastest lap
- Rider: (France) Dominique Sarron
- Time: 2:55.970
Podium
- First: (Spain) Sito Pons
- Second: (United Kingdom) Donnie McLeod
- Third: (Switzerland) Jacques Cornu

125cc
Pole position
- Rider: (Italy) Luca Cadalora
- Time: 2:44.690
Fastest lap
- Rider: (Italy) Domenico Brigaglia
- Time: 3:02.050
Podium
- First: (Italy) Domenico Brigaglia
- Second: (Brazil) Lucio Pietroniro
- Third: (Argentina) Willy Pérez

80cc
Pole position
- Rider: No 80cc race was held
Fastest lap
- Rider: No 80cc race was held
Podium
- First: No 80cc race was held
- Second: No 80cc race was held
- Third: No 80cc race was held

The 1986 Belgian motorcycle Grand Prix was the seventh round of the 1986 Grand Prix motorcycle racing season. It took place on the weekend of 4–6 July 1986 at the Circuit de Spa-Francorchamps.

== Classification ==
=== 500 cc ===
Pos.	Rider	Team	Manufacturer	Time/Retired	Points
1	(United States) Randy Mamola	Team Lucky Strike Roberts	Yamaha	57'25.020	15
2	(United States) Eddie Lawson	Marlboro Yamaha Team Agostini	Yamaha	+17.430	12
3	(France) Christian Sarron	Team Gauloises Blondes Yamaha	Yamaha	+1'02.820	10
4	(Australia) Wayne Gardner	Rothmans Team HRC	Honda	+1'08.280	8
5	(United Kingdom) Rob McElnea	Marlboro Yamaha Team Agostini	Yamaha	+1'13.630	6
6	(Italy) Pierfrancesco Chili	HB Suzuki GP Team	Honda	+2'23.670	5
7	(Belgium) Didier de Radiguès	Rollstar Honda Racing Team	Honda	+2'39.240	4
8	(Netherlands) Mile Pajic	Stichting Netherlands Racing Team	Honda	+1 lap	3
9	(Netherlands) Boet van Dulmen		Honda	+1 lap	2
10	(United States) Kevin Schwantz		Suzuki	+1 lap	1
11	(Switzerland) Wolfgang Von Muralt	Frankonia-Suzuki	Suzuki	+1 lap	
12	(United Kingdom) Mark Phillips		Suzuki	+1 lap	
13	(Japan) Masuru Mizutani	Walter Wolf Racing	Suzuki	+1 lap	
14	(Sweden) Peter Sköld		Bakker-Honda	+1 lap	
15	(West Germany) Robert Jung		Honda	+1 lap	
16	(United Kingdom) Gary Lingham		Suzuki	+1 lap	
17	(Belgium) Paul Ramon		Suzuki	+1 lap	
18	(United Kingdom) David Griffith		Suzuki	+2 laps	
Ret	(Italy) Alessandro Valesi		Honda	Retired	
Ret	(Luxembourg) Andreas Leuthe		Honda	Retired	
Ret	(United States) Mike Baldwin	Team Lucky Strike Roberts	Yamaha	Accident	
Ret	(Austria) Dietmar Marehardt		Honda	Retired	
Ret	(Belgium) Bernard Denis		Suzuki	Retired	
Ret	(France) Raymond Roche	Racing Team Katayama	Honda	Accident	
Ret	(Spain) Juan Garriga		Cagiva	Retired	
Ret	(Italy) Fabio Biliotti	Team Italia	Honda	Retired	
Ret	(Australia) Paul Lewis	Skoal Bandit Heron Suzuki	Suzuki	Accident	
Ret	(Netherlands) Maarten Duyzers		Suzuki	Retired	
Ret	(Finland) Eero Hyvärinen		Honda	Retired	
Ret	(United Kingdom) Ron Haslam	Team ROC	Honda	Accident	
Ret	(Switzerland) Marco Gentile	Fior	Fior	Retired	
Ret	(West Germany) Manfred Fischer	Team Hein Gericke	Honda	Retired	
Ret	(Italy) Leandro Beccheroni		Suzuki	Retired	
Ret	(United Kingdom) Roger Burnett	Rothmans Honda Britain	Honda	Retired	
Ret	(Austria) Karl Truchsess		Honda	Retired	
Ret	(United Kingdom) Simon Buckmaster		Honda	Retired	
Ret	(Austria) Josef Doppler	HRC Grieskirched	Honda	Retired	
DNQ	(Netherlands) Harry Heutmekers		Suzuki	Did not qualify	

Previous race: 1986 Dutch TT	FIM Grand Prix World Championship; 1986 season	Next race: 1986 French Grand Prix
Previous race: 1985 Belgian Grand Prix	Belgian Grand Prix	Next race: 1988 Belgian Grand Prix
