= 1986 British motorcycle Grand Prix =

(United Kingdom) 1986 British Grand Prix
Race details
- Race 9 of 12 races in the 1986 Grand Prix motorcycle racing season
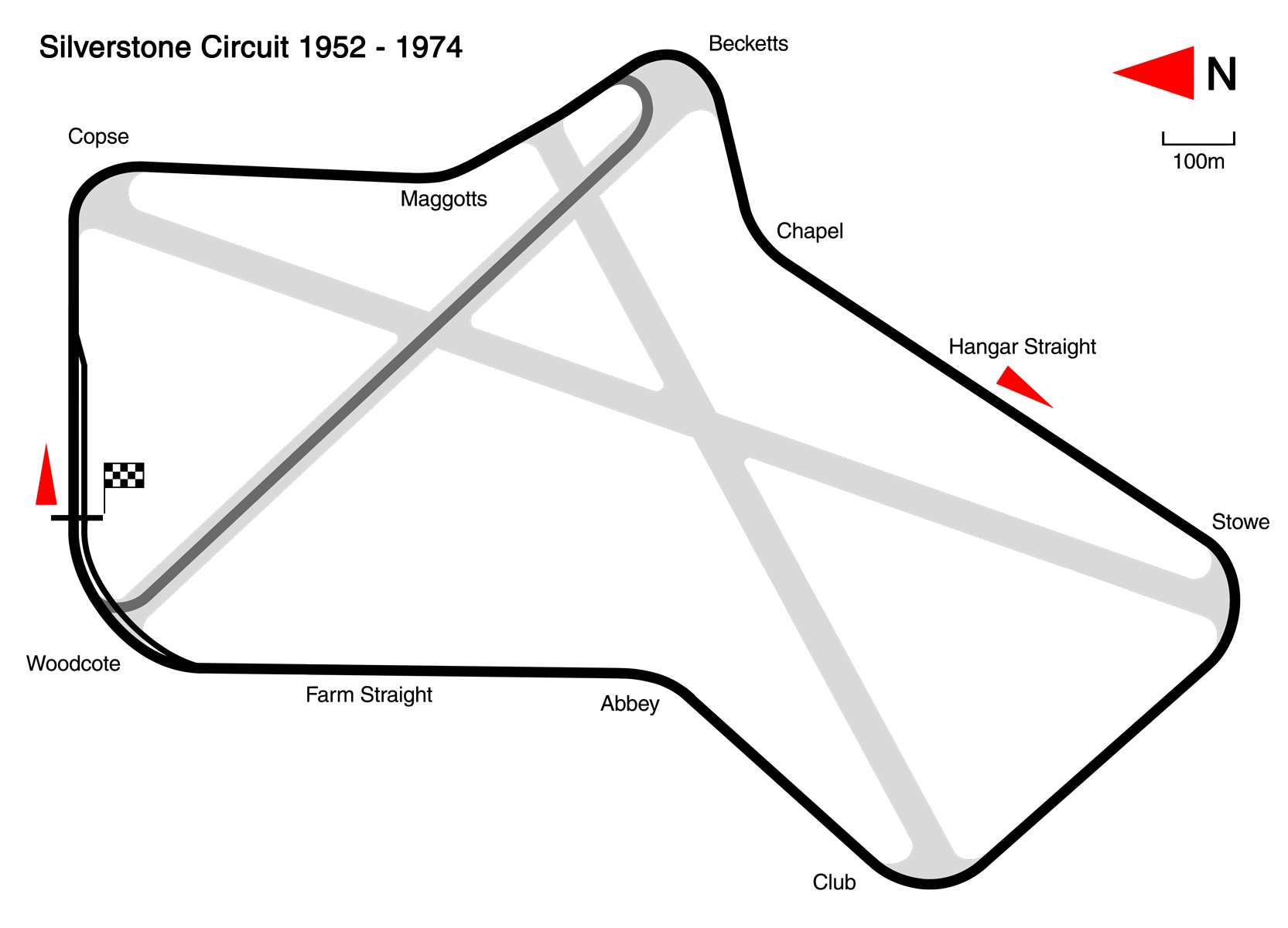
- Date: 3 August 1986
- Official name: Shell Oils British Motorcycle Grand Prix
- Location: Silverstone Circuit
- Course: Permanent racing facility; 4.711 km (2.927 mi)

500cc
Pole position
Rider	(Australia) Wayne Gardner	Honda
Time	1:28.160	
Fastest lap
Rider	(United States) Eddie Lawson	
Podium
First	(Australia) Wayne Gardner	Honda
Second	(Belgium) Didier de Radiguès	Honda
Third	(United States) Eddie Lawson	Yamaha

250cc
Pole position
Rider	(Venezuela) Carlos Lavado	
Time	1:31.500	
Fastest lap
Rider	(Venezuela) Carlos Lavado	
Podium
First	(France) Dominique Sarron	Honda
Second	(Venezuela) Carlos Lavado	Yamaha
Third	(Spain) Sito Pons	Honda

125cc
Pole position
Rider	(Switzerland) Bruno Kneubühler	
Time	1:37.790	
Fastest lap
Rider	(Austria) August Auinger	
Podium
First	(Austria) August Auinger	Bartol
Second	(Italy) Domenico Brigaglia	Ducados
Third	(Italy) Luca Cadalora	Garelli

80cc
Pole position
Rider	(Switzerland) Stefan Dörflinger	
Fastest lap
Rider	(Switzerland) Stefan Dörflinger	
Podium
First	(United Kingdom) Ian McConnachie	Krauser
Second	(Switzerland) Stefan Dörflinger	Krauser
Third	(Spain) Jorge Martínez	Derbi

The 1986 British motorcycle Grand Prix was the ninth round of the 1986 Grand Prix motorcycle racing season. It took place on the weekend of 1–3 August 1986 at the Silverstone Circuit. This was the last motorcycle race held at Silverstone, before the race was moved to Donington Park for the 1987 season.

== Classification ==
=== 500 cc ===
Pos.	Rider	Team	Manufacturer	Time/Retired	Points
1	(Australia) Wayne Gardner	Rothmans Team HRC	Honda	51'24.030	15
2	(Belgium) Didier de Radiguès	Rollstar Honda Racing Team	Honda	+9.360	12
3	(United States) Eddie Lawson	Marlboro Yamaha Team Agostini	Yamaha	+10.630	10
4	(United Kingdom) Rob McElnea	Marlboro Yamaha Team Agostini	Yamaha	+22.350	8
5	(United States) Randy Mamola	Team Lucky Strike Roberts	Yamaha	+47.560	6
6	(France) Raymond Roche	Racing Team Katayama	Honda	+1'06.330	5
7	(United Kingdom) Niall Mackenzie	Skoal Bandit Heron Suzuki	Suzuki	+1'40.250	4
8	(United Kingdom) Kenny Irons		Yamaha	+1'41.110	3
9	(United Kingdom) Ron Haslam	Team ROC	Honda	+1'44.240	2
10	(Switzerland) Wolfgang Von Muralt	Frankonia-Suzuki	Suzuki	+1'49.310	1
11	(United Kingdom) Roger Burnett	Rothmans Honda Britain	Honda	+1 lap	
12	(Netherlands) Boet van Dulmen		Honda	+1 lap	
13	(United Kingdom) Ray Swann		Suzuki	+1 lap	
14	(Netherlands) Maarten Duyzers		Suzuki	+1 lap	
15	(Netherlands) Henk van der Mark		Honda	+2 laps	
16	(United Kingdom) Glenn Williams		Suzuki	+2 laps	
17	(United Kingdom) David Griffith		Suzuki	+2 laps	
18	(United States) Mike Baldwin	Team Lucky Strike Roberts	Yamaha	+2 laps	
19	(West Germany) Manfred Fischer	Team Hein Gericke	Honda	+2 laps	
20	(United Kingdom) Barry Woodland		Suzuki	+3 laps	
21	(United Kingdom) Steve Manley		Suzuki	+3 laps	
22	(United Kingdom) Alan Jeffery		Suzuki	+3 laps	
23	(West Germany) Helmut Schütz	Rallye Sport	Honda	+5 laps	
Ret	(United Kingdom) Gary Lingham		Suzuki	Retired	
Ret	(Switzerland) Christopher Bürki		Honda	Retired	
Ret	(New Zealand) Dennis Ireland		Suzuki	Retired	
Ret	(France) Christian le Liard	Team ROC	Honda	Retired	
Ret	(Netherlands) Hennie Boerman		Suzuki	Retired	
Ret	(Spain) Juan Garriga		Cagiva	Retired	
Ret	(United Kingdom) Simon Buckmaster		Honda	Retired	
Ret	(Netherlands) Mile Pajic	Stichting Netherlands Racing Team	Honda	Accident	
Ret	(Italy) Fabio Biliotti	Team Italia	Honda	Retired	
Ret	(France) Christian Sarron	Team Gauloises Blondes Yamaha	Yamaha	Accident	
Ret	(United Kingdom) Trever Nation		Suzuki	Retired	
Ret	(Switzerland) Marco Gentile	Fior	Fior	Retired	
Ret	(Japan) Shunji Yatsushiro	Team HRC	Honda	Accident	
Ret	(United Kingdom) Roger Marshall	Rothmans Honda Britain	Honda	Retired	
Ret	(Sweden) Lars Johansson		Suzuki	Retired	
Ret	(Australia) Paul Lewis	Skoal Bandit Heron Suzuki	Honda	Accident	
DNS	(Zimbabwe) Dave Petersen	HB Suzuki GP Team	Suzuki	Did not start	
DNS	(Italy) Pierfrancesco Chili	HB Suzuki GP Team	Honda	Did not start	

Previous race: 1986 French Grand Prix	FIM Grand Prix World Championship; 1986 season	Next race: 1986 Swedish Grand Prix
Previous race: 1985 British Grand Prix	British Grand Prix	Next race: 1987 British Grand Prix
