= Boet van Dulmen =

Dutch motorcycle racer (1948–2021)

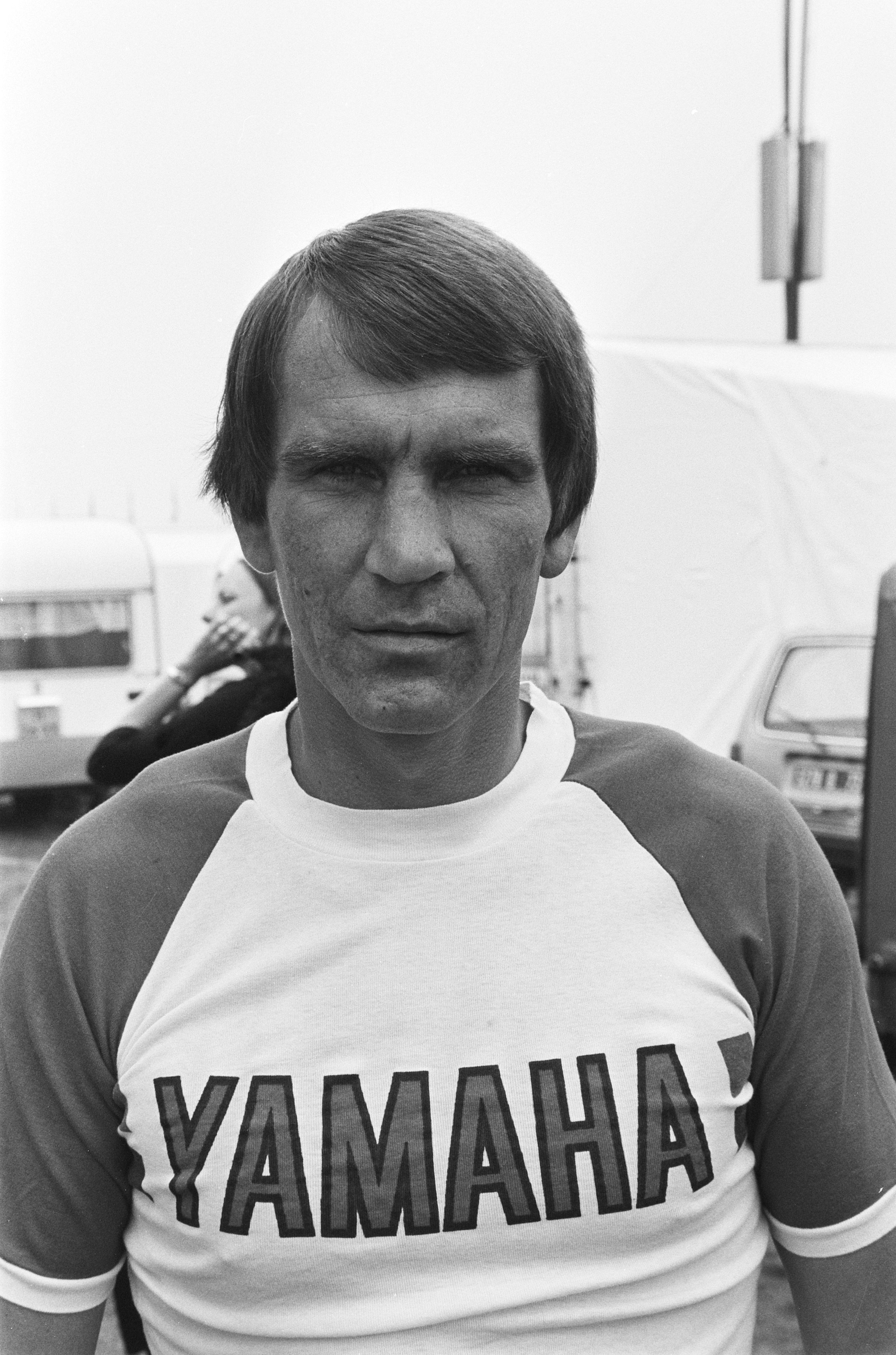
- Van Dulmen in 1981
- Nationality: Dutch
- Born: 19 April 1948; Ammerzoden, Gelderland, Netherlands
- Died: 16 September 2021 (aged 73); Ammerzoden, Gelderland, Netherlands
Motorcycle racing career statistics
Grand Prix motorcycle racing
Active years	1974 - 1986
First race	1974 250cc Belgian Grand Prix
Last race	1986 500cc San Marino Grand Prix
First win	1979 500cc Finnish Grand Prix
Last win	1979 500cc Finnish Grand Prix
Team	Suzuki
Championships	0
Starts / Wins / Podiums / Poles / F. laps / Points; 84 / 1 / 4 / 1 / 0 / 255

Antonius Pius Maria "Boet" van Dulmen (Dutch pronunciation: [ˈbut fɑn ˈdʏlmə(n)]; 19 May 1948 – 16 September 2021) was a Dutch professional motorcycle road racer. He competed in Grand Prix motorcycle racing between 1974 and 1986, mostly as a privateer racer. Van Dulmen was prominent for his impressive wet weather riding abilities.

== Motorcycle racing career ==
Van Dulmen was born in Ammerzoden, Gelderland, Netherlands, on 19 May 1948. As a child, he was nicknamed "Boet" by his brother. As a teenager, he began to work as an apprentice motorcycle mechanic at a friend's garage and from there developed an interest in motorcycle racing.

At the age of 26, van Dulmen competed in his first World Championship event at the 1974 250cc Belgian Grand Prix riding a MZ motorcycle. He scored the first podium result of his career with a third-place at the 1979 500cc Swedish Grand Prix behind Barry Sheene and Jack Middelburg. One week later, van Dulmen defeated Randy Mamola and Sheene at the 1979 500cc Finnish Grand Prix to claim the first and only world championship victory of his career. He ended the season ranked sixth the premier 500 class. He also won the Dutch round of the 1979 Formula 750 Championship held at the Assen Circuit.

Van Dulmen scored two more podium results in 1981 with a second-place behind the eventual World Champion Marco Lucchinelli at the 1981 Dutch TT, and another second-place behind Barry Sheene at the 1981 500cc Swedish Grand Prix. At the age of 38, he competed in his final world championship race at the 1986 500cc San Marino Grand Prix.

Together with Wil Hartog and Jack Middelburg, van Dulmen was part of a contingent of Dutch riders who competed at the highest levels of Grand Prix racing in the late 1970s.

== Later life and death ==
After his motorcycle racing career, van Dulmen started his own transport company. His hometown of Ammerzoden honored him in 2020 with a bronze bust.

Van Dulmen was killed in a road accident in Ammerzoden on 16 September 2021 at the age of 73. He was hit by a delivery van while riding his bicycle and, despite surgical intervention, he died later in hospital.

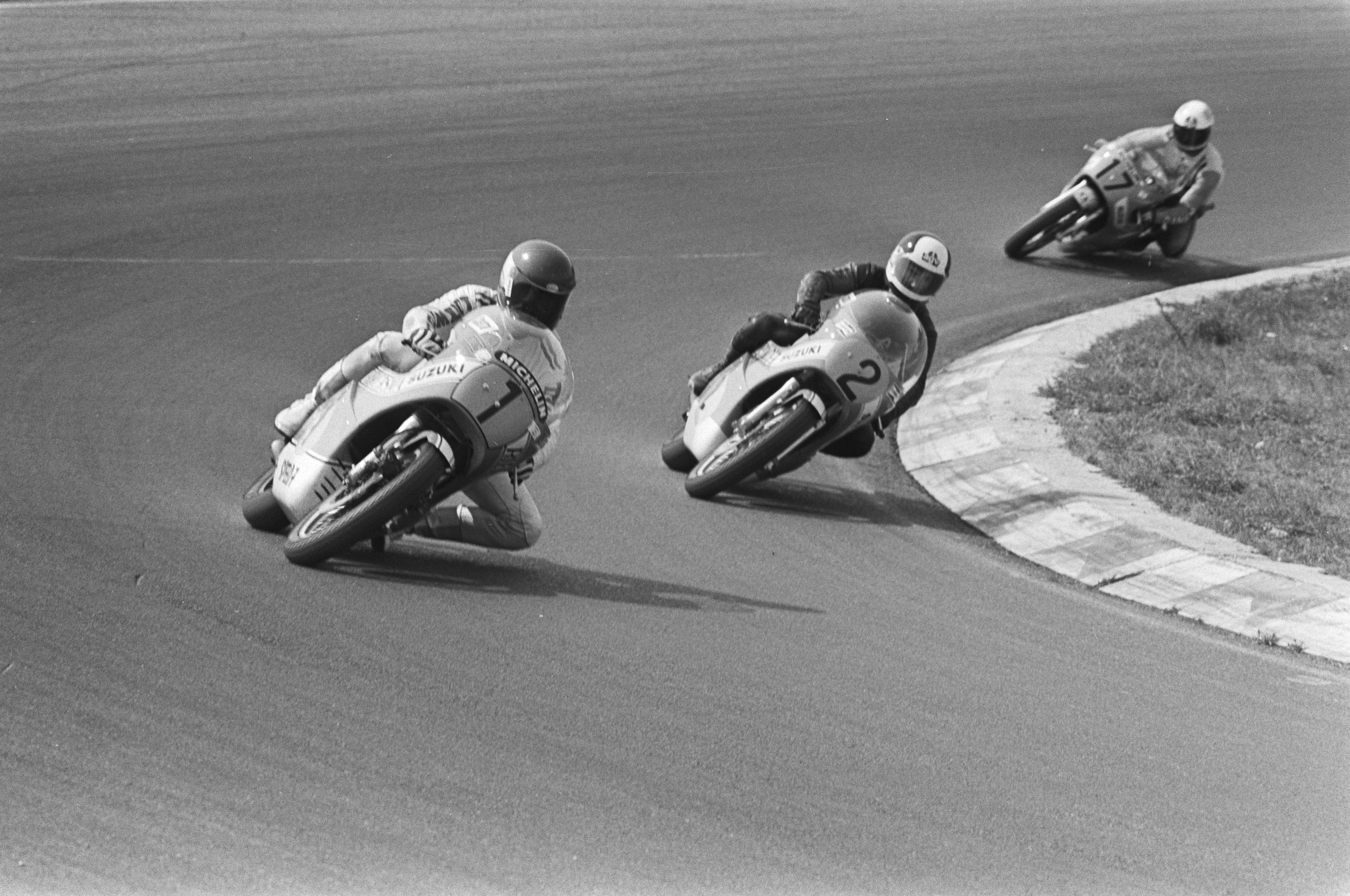
Wil Hartog (1) leads Van Dulmen (2) and Marcel Ankoné (17) during a race at the Zandvoort Circuit

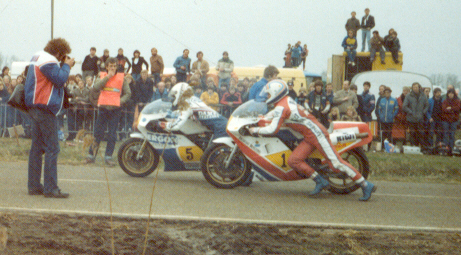
Boet van Dulmen (right) with Jack Middelburg (5) on the starting line at a race in Heeswijk in 1982

== Career statistics ==
=== Grand Prix motorcycle racing ===
==== Races by year ====
(key) (Races in bold indicate pole position) (Races in italics indicate fastest lap)

Year	Class	Bike	1	2	3	4	5	6	7	8	9	10	11	12	Pos.	Pts
1974	250cc	MZ	GER	NAT	IOM	NED	BEL; 26	SWE	FIN; Ret	CZE; 27	YUG	SPA			NC	0
1974	350cc	Yamaha	FRA	GER	AUT	NAT	IOM	NED; 12	SWE						NC	0
1974	350cc	MZ								FIN; Ret	YUG	SPA			NC	0
1975	250cc	MZ	FRA; Ret	SPA		GER	NAT	IOM	NED; DNS	BEL	SWE				NC	0
1975	250cc	Yamaha										FIN; 12	CZE	YUG	NC	0
1975	350cc	MZ	FRA; 12	SPA					NED; Ret						36th	3
1975	350cc	Yamaha			AUT; 11	GER	NAT	IOM				FIN; 8	CZE	YUG	36th	3
1975	500cc	Yamaha	FRA		AUT; 16	GER	NAT	IOM	NED	BEL	SWE	FIN	CZE		NC	0
1976	250cc	Yamaha	FRA		NAT	YUG	IOM	NED	BEL; 14	SWE	FIN	CZE	GER	SPA; 7	26th	4
1976	350cc	Yamaha	FRA; Ret	AUT	NAT; 8	YUG	IOM	NED; Ret			FIN	CZE; Ret	GER	SPA; 8	25th	6
1976	500cc	Yamaha	FRA; 10	AUT; 13	NAT; Ret		IOM	NED; Ret							25th	9
1976	500cc	Suzuki							BEL; 13	SWE	FIN; Ret	CZE; 8	GER; 6		25th	9
1977	500cc	Suzuki	VEN	AUT; Ret	GER; 10	NAT; 9	FRA; 12	NED	BEL	SWE	FIN	CZE; Ret	GBR; Ret		27th	3
1978	500cc	Suzuki	VEN	SPA; 11	AUT; 8	FRA; 21	NAT; 9	NED; 8	BEL; Ret	SWE; 11	FIN; 7	GBR; Ret	GER; 8		13th	15
1979	500cc	Suzuki	VEN	AUT; NC	GER; Ret	NAT; Ret	SPA; 6	YUG; 5	NED; 4	BEL; DNS	SWE; 3	**FIN**; 1	GBR; 5	FRA; Ret	6th	50
1980	500cc	Yamaha	NAT; Ret	SPA; 18	FRA; 19	NED; 4	BEL; 9	FIN; Ret	GBR; 16	GER; Ret					14th	10
1981	500cc	Yamaha	AUT; 5	GER; 4	NAT; 4	FRA; 8	YUG; 7	NED; 2	BEL; 5	RSM; Ret	GBR; 6	FIN; Ret	SWE; 2		6th	64
1982	500cc	Suzuki	ARG; 11	AUT; 5	FRA; DNS	SPA	NAT			YUG; 11	GBR; Ret	SWE; 7	RSM; Ret	GER; 7	12th	23
1982	500cc	Yamaha						NED; 6	BEL; 7						12th	23
1983	500cc	Suzuki	RSA; Ret	FRA; Ret	NAT; Ret	GER; 10	SPA; 11	AUT; 10	YUG; 7	NED; 8	BEL; 9	GBR; 8	SWE; 12	RSM; 8	11th	17
1984	500cc	Suzuki	RSA; 7	NAT; 7	SPA; 5	AUT; 8	GER; 9	FRA; Ret	YUG	NED	BEL; Ret	GBR; 19	SWE; 7	RSM; 9	8th	25
1985	500cc	Honda	RSA; 18	SPA; Ret	GER; 10	NAT; 13	AUT; 8	YUG; 14	NED; 4	BEL; 9	FRA; Ret	GBR; 7	SWE; 14	RSM; 17	10th	18
1986	500cc	Honda	SPA; 15	NAT; 6	GER; 13	AUT; 10	YUG; 13	NED; 12	BEL; 9	FRA; 14	GBR; 12	SWE; 13	RSM; 18		12th	8
