= 1986 French motorcycle Grand Prix =

(France) 1986 French Grand Prix
Race details
- Race 8 of 12 races in the 1986 Grand Prix motorcycle racing season
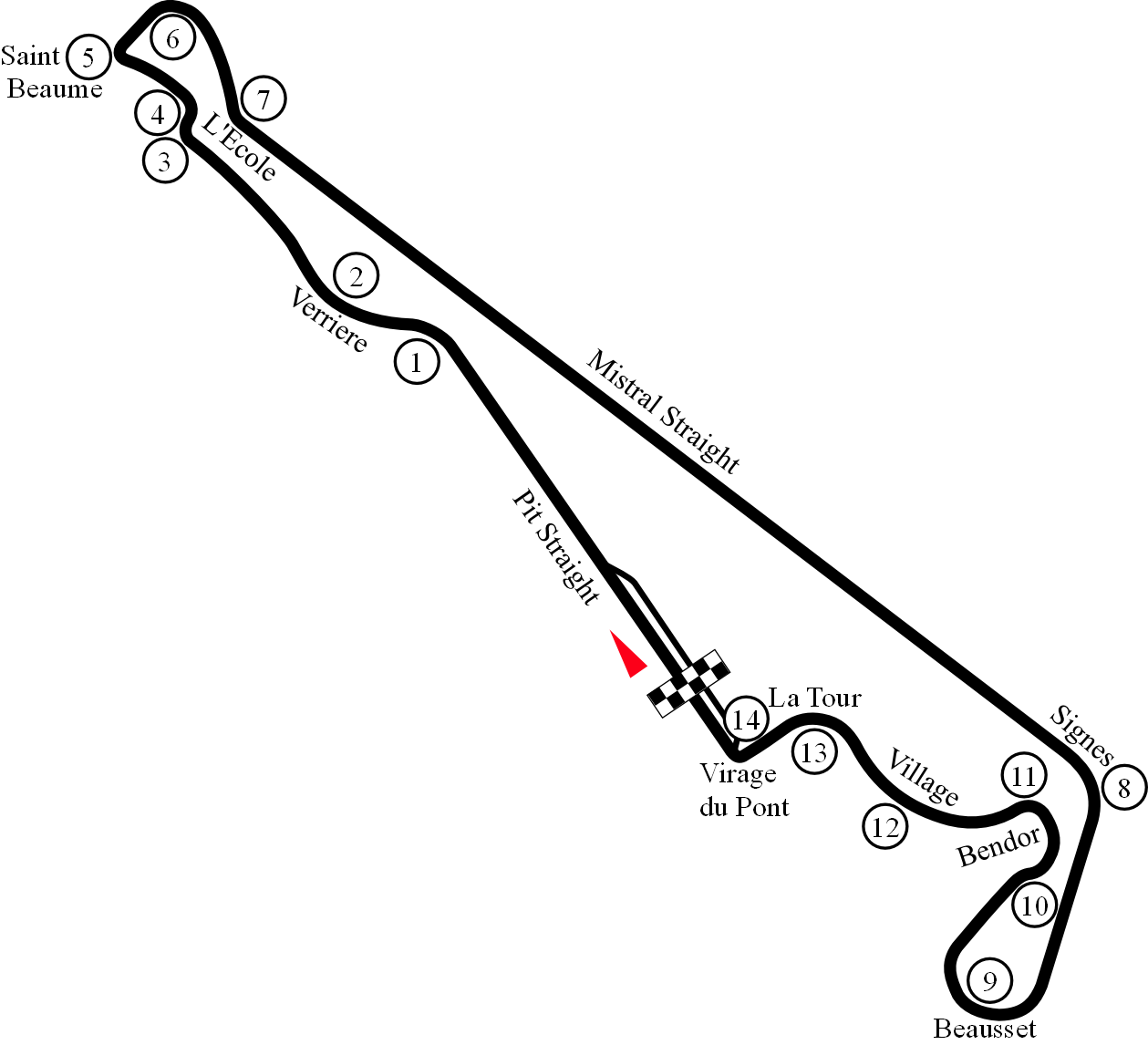
- Date: 20 July 1986
- Official name: Grand Prix de France
- Location: Circuit Paul Ricard
- Course: Permanent racing facility; 5.809 km (3.610 mi)

500cc
Pole position
- Rider: (United States) Eddie Lawson
- Time: 2:00.740
Fastest lap
- Rider: (United States) Eddie Lawson
- Time: 2:01.520
Podium
- First: (United States) Eddie Lawson
- Second: (United States) Randy Mamola
- Third: (France) Christian Sarron

250cc
Pole position
- Rider: (West Germany) Martin Wimmer
- Time: 2:06.580
Fastest lap
- Rider: (Venezuela) Carlos Lavado
- Time: 2:06.950
Podium
- First: (Venezuela) Carlos Lavado
- Second: (Spain) Sito Pons
- Third: (France) Dominique Sarron

125cc
Pole position
- Rider: (Italy) Luca Cadalora
- Time: 2:14.670
Fastest lap
- Rider: (Italy) Luca Cadalora
- Time: 2:13.350
Podium
- First: (Italy) Luca Cadalora
- Second: (Italy) Fausto Gresini
- Third: (Austria) August Auinger

80cc
Pole position
- Rider: No 80cc race was held
Fastest lap
- Rider: No 80cc race was held
Podium
- First: No 80cc race was held
- Second: No 80cc race was held
- Third: No 80cc race was held

The 1986 French motorcycle Grand Prix was the eighth round of the 1986 Grand Prix motorcycle racing season. It took place on the weekend of 19–20 July 1986 at the Paul Ricard Circuit.

== Classification ==
=== 500 cc ===
Pos.	Rider	Team	Manufacturer	Time/Retired	Points
1	(United States) Eddie Lawson	Marlboro Yamaha Team Agostini	Yamaha	42'57.010	15
2	(United States) Randy Mamola	Team Lucky Strike Roberts	Yamaha	+12.350	12
3	(France) Christian Sarron	Team Gauloises Blondes Yamaha	Yamaha	+14.460	10
4	(United States) Mike Baldwin	Team Lucky Strike Roberts	Yamaha	+14.820	8
5	(Australia) Wayne Gardner	Rothmans Team HRC	Honda	+22.260	6
6	(United Kingdom) Rob McElnea	Marlboro Yamaha Team Agostini	Yamaha	+26.170	5
7	(United Kingdom) Ron Haslam	Team ROC	Honda	+1'05.030	4
8	(Belgium) Didier de Radiguès	Rollstar Honda Racing Team	Honda	+1'26.070	3
9	(Zimbabwe) Dave Petersen	HB Suzuki GP Team	Suzuki	+1'41.180	2
10	(Australia) Paul Lewis		Suzuki	+1'52.950	1
11	(Switzerland) Wolfgang Von Muralt	Frankonia-Suzuki	Suzuki	+1'57.020	
12	(Switzerland) Marco Gentile	Fior	Fior	+2'03.650	
13	(Italy) Fabio Biliotti	Team Italia	Honda	+2'04.700	
14	(Netherlands) Boet van Dulmen		Honda	+1 lap	
15	(France) Christian Le Liard	Team ROC	Honda	+1 lap	
16	(Netherlands) Mile Pajic	Stichting Netherlands Racing Team	Honda	+1 lap	
17	(United Kingdom) Simon Buckmaster		Honda	+1 lap	
18	(Italy) Alessandro Valesi		Honda	+2 laps	
19	(Austria) Dietmar Mayer		Honda	+1 lap	
20	(Spain) Juan Garriga		Cagiva	+2 laps	
Ret	(West Germany) Lothar Spiegler		Suzuki	Retired	
Ret	(France) Raymond Roche	Racing Team Katayama	Honda	Retired	
Ret	(France) Louis-Luc Maisto		Honda	Retired	
Ret	(West Germany) Manfred Fischer	Team Hein Gericke	Honda	Accident	
Ret	(Italy) Pierfrancesco Chili	HB Suzuki GP Team	Honda	Retired	
Ret	(Spain) José Parra		Honda	Retired	
Ret	(France) Philippe Robinet		Fior	Retired	
Ret	(Italy) Leandro Beccheroni		Suzuki	Retired	
DNS	(Netherlands) Henk van der Mark		Honda	Did not start	
DNS	(Austria) Josef Ragginger		Suzuki	Did not start	
DNS	(West Germany) Gustav Reiner	Honda Deutschland	Honda	Did not start	
DNQ	(Spain) Stelio Marmaras		Suzuki	Did not qualify	

Previous race: 1986 Belgian Grand Prix	FIM Grand Prix World Championship; 1986 season	Next race: 1986 British Grand Prix
Previous race: 1985 French Grand Prix	French Grand Prix	Next race: 1987 French Grand Prix
