= 1986 Yugoslavian motorcycle Grand Prix =

(Socialist Federal Republic of Yugoslavia) 1986 Yugoslavian Grand Prix
Race details
- Race 5 of 12 races in the 1986 Grand Prix motorcycle racing season
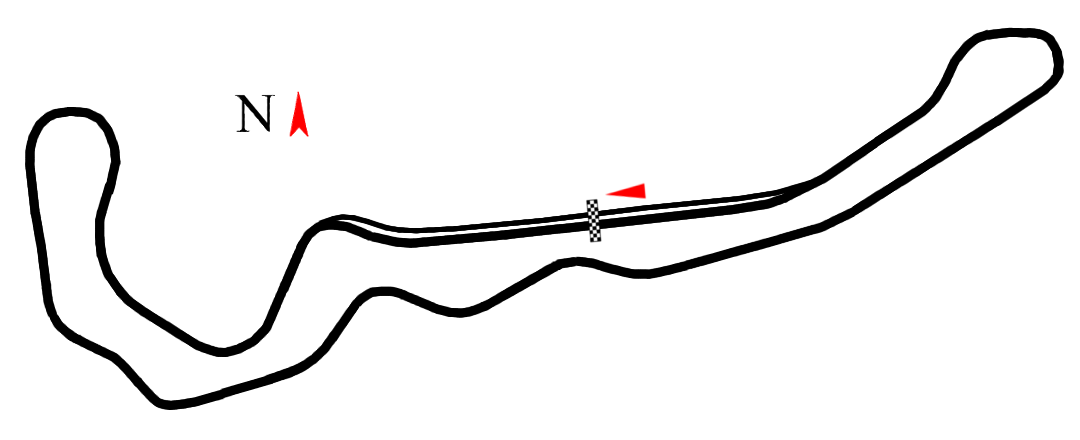
- Date: 28 June 1986
- Official name: Yu Grand Prix
- Location: Automotodrom Rijeka
- Course: Permanent racing facility; 4.168 km (2.590 mi)

500cc
Pole position
- Rider: (United States) Randy Mamola
- Time: 1:31.550
Fastest lap
- Rider: (United States) Eddie Lawson
- Time: 1:32.120
Podium
- First: (United States) Eddie Lawson
- Second: (United States) Randy Mamola
- Third: (Australia) Wayne Gardner

250cc
Pole position
- Rider: (Venezuela) Carlos Lavado
- Time: 1:33.760
Fastest lap
- Rider: (Venezuela) Carlos Lavado
- Time: 1:33.430
Podium
- First: (Spain) Sito Pons
- Second: (France) Jean-François Baldé
- Third: (France) Dominique Sarron

125cc
Pole position
- Rider: No 125cc race was held
Fastest lap
- Rider: No 125cc race was held
Podium
- First: No 125cc race was held
- Second: No 125cc race was held
- Third: No 125cc race was held

80cc
Pole position
- Rider: (Spain) Jorge Martínez
Fastest lap
- Rider: (Spain) Jorge Martínez
Podium
- First: (Spain) Jorge Martínez
- Second: (Switzerland) Stefan Dörflinger
- Third: (United Kingdom) Ian McConnachie

The 1986 Yugoslavian motorcycle Grand Prix was the fifth round of the 1986 Grand Prix motorcycle racing season. It took place on the weekend of 26–28 June 1986 at the Automotodrom Rijeka.

== Classification ==
=== 500 cc ===
Pos.	Rider	Team	Manufacturer	Time/Retired	Points
1	(United States) Eddie Lawson	Marlboro Yamaha Team Agostini	Yamaha	49'55.810	15
2	(United States) Randy Mamola	Team Lucky Strike Roberts	Yamaha	+10.740	12
3	(Australia) Wayne Gardner	Rothmans Team HRC	Honda	+11.360	10
4	(United Kingdom) Rob McElnea	Marlboro Yamaha Team Agostini	Yamaha	+24.320	8
5	(United States) Mike Baldwin	Team Lucky Strike Roberts	Yamaha	+32.320	6
6	(France) Christian Sarron	Team Gauloises Blondes Yamaha	Yamaha	+37.340	5
7	(France) Raymond Roche	Racing Team Katayama	Honda	+49.910	4
8	(Japan) Shunji Yatsushiro	Team HRC	Honda	+1'19.250	3
9	(Zimbabwe) Dave Petersen	HB Suzuki GP Team	Suzuki	+1 lap	2
10	(Australia) Paul Lewis	Skoal Bandit Heron Suzuki	Suzuki	+1 lap	1
11	(Switzerland) Wolfgang Von Muralt	Frankonia-Suzuki	Suzuki	+1 lap	
12	(Spain) Juan Garriga		Cagiva	+1 lap	
13	(Netherlands) Boet van Dulmen		Honda	+1 lap	
14	(Finland) Eero Hyvärinen		Honda	+1 lap	
15	(Switzerland) Marco Gentile	Fior	Fior	+1 lap	
16	(Italy) Marco Papa		Honda	+1 lap	
17	(Italy) Fabio Barchitta		Honda	+1 lap	
18	(Netherlands) Mile Pajic	Stichting Netherlands Racing Team	Honda	+2 laps	
19	(West Germany) Robert Jung		Honda	+2 laps	
20	(Luxembourg) Andreas Leuthe		Honda	+2 laps	
21	(Italy) Marco Marchesani		Suzuki	+2 laps	
22	(Czechoslovakia) Pavol Dekánek		Suzuki	+2 laps	
23	(Netherlands) Maarten Duyzers		Suzuki	+2 laps	
24	(Italy) Leandro Becheroni		Suzuki	+2 laps	
Ret	(Austria) Josef Doppler	HRC Grieskirched	Honda	Retired	
Ret	(West Germany) Helmut Schütz	Rallye Sport	Honda	Accident	
Ret	(Italy) Fabio Biliotti	Team Italia	Honda	Accident	
Ret	(Netherlands) Henk van der Mark		Honda	Accident	
Ret	(United Kingdom) Ron Haslam	Team ROC	Honda	Retired	
Ret	(Italy) Pierfrancesco Chili	HB Suzuki GP Team	Honda	Retired	
Ret	(West Germany) Manfred Fischer	Team Hein Gericke	Honda	Retired	
Ret	(Italy) Armando Errico		Suzuki	Retired	
DNS	(Austria) Dietmar Marehardt		Honda	Did not start	
DNS	(Belgium) Didier de Radiguès	Rollstar Honda Racing Team	Honda	Did not start	
DNS	(West Germany) Gustav Reiner	Honda Deutschland	Honda	Did not start	
DNS	(United Kingdom) Simon Buckmaster		Honda	Did not start	
DNQ	(Austria) Rudolf Zeller		Honda	Did not qualify	
DNQ	(Greece) Dimitris Papandreou		Yamaha	Did not qualify	
DNQ	(West Germany) Detlef Vogt		Suzuki	Did not qualify	
DNQ	(Spain) José Parra		Honda	Did not qualify	

Previous race: 1986 Austrian Grand Prix	FIM Grand Prix World Championship; 1986 season	Next race: 1986 Dutch TT
Previous race: 1985 Yugoslavian Grand Prix	Yugoslavian Grand Prix	Next race: 1987 Yugoslavian Grand Prix
