= 1986 Spanish motorcycle Grand Prix =

(Spain) 1986 Spanish Grand Prix
Race details
- Race 1 of 12 races in the 1986 Grand Prix motorcycle racing season
- Date: 4 May 1986
- Official name: Gran Premio de España
- Location: Circuito Permanente del Jarama
- Course: Permanent racing facility; 3.404 km (2.115 mi)

500cc
Pole position
- Rider: (United States) Freddie Spencer
- Time: 1:28.480
Fastest lap
- Rider: (Australia) Wayne Gardner
- Time: 1:29.350
Podium
- First: (Australia) Wayne Gardner
- Second: (United States) Eddie Lawson
- Third: (United States) Mike Baldwin

250cc
Pole position
- Rider: (Germany) Martin Wimmer
- Time: 1:31.150
Fastest lap
- Rider: (Germany) Martin Wimmer
- Time: 1:31.050
Podium
- First: (Venezuela) Carlos Lavado
- Second: (West Germany) Anton Mang
- Third: (Spain) Sito Pons

125cc
Pole position
- Rider: (Italy) Fausto Gresini
- Time: 1:34.500
Fastest lap
- Rider: (Italy) Fausto Gresini
- Time: 1:35.470
Podium
- First: (Italy) Fausto Gresini
- Second: (Italy) Domenico Brigaglia
- Third: (Italy) Ezio Gianola

80cc
Pole position
- Rider: (Spain) Jorge Martínez
Fastest lap
- Rider: (Spain) Jorge Martínez
Podium
- First: (Spain) Jorge Martínez
- Second: (Spain) Ángel Nieto
- Third: (Spain) Manuel Herreros

The 1986 Spanish motorcycle Grand Prix was the first round of the 1986 Grand Prix motorcycle racing season. It took place on the weekend of 2–4 May 1986 at the Circuito Permanente del Jarama.

== Classification ==
=== 500 cc ===
Pos.	Rider	Team	Manufacturer	Time/Retired	Points
1	(Australia) Wayne Gardner	Rothmans Team HRC	Honda	56'01.870	15
2	(United States) Eddie Lawson	Marlboro Yamaha Team Agostini	Yamaha	+2.070	12
3	(United States) Mike Baldwin	Team Lucky Strike Roberts	Yamaha	+17.170	10
4	(United States) Randy Mamola	Team Lucky Strike Roberts	Yamaha	+28.160	8
5	(France) Christian Sarron	Team Gauloises Blondes Yamaha	Yamaha	+29.970	6
6	(France) Raymond Roche	Racing Team Katayama	Honda	+30.060	5
7	(United Kingdom) Rob McElnea	Marlboro Yamaha Team Agostini	Yamaha	+30.470	4
8	(Spain) Juan Garriga		Cagiva	+1'13.990	3
9	(Italy) Fabio Biliotti	Team Italia	Honda	+1'14.170	2
10	(United Kingdom) Ron Haslam	Team ROC	Honda	+1 lap	1
11	(Australia) Paul Lewis	Skoal Bandit Heron Suzuki	Suzuki	+1 lap	
12	(Zimbabwe) Dave Petersen	HB Suzuki GP Team	Suzuki	+1 lap	
13	(Netherlands) Henk van der Mark		Honda	+1 lap	
14	(Italy) Pierfrancesco Chili	HB Suzuki GP Team	Honda	+1 lap	
15	(Netherlands) Boet van Dulmen		Honda	+1 lap	
16	(Sweden) Peter Sköld		Bakker-Honda	+1 lap	
17	(United Kingdom) Simon Buckmaster		Honda	+1 lap	
18	(West Germany) Manfred Fischer	Team Hein Gericke	Honda	+1 lap	
19	(Switzerland) Marco Gentile	Fior	Fior	+1 lap	
20	(Luxembourg) Andreas Leuthe		Honda	+2 laps	
21	(West Germany) Dietmar Mayer		Honda	+3 laps	
Ret	(Italy) Leandro Beccheroni		Suzuki	Retired	
Ret	(United States) Freddie Spencer	Rothmans Team HRC	Honda	Injury	
Ret	(Belgium) Didier de Radiguès	Rollstar Honda Racing Team	Honda	Accident	
Ret	(Sweden) Peter Linden		Honda	Retired	
Ret	(West Germany) Gustav Reiner	Honda Deutschland	Honda	Accident	
DNS	(Switzerland) Wolfgang Von Muralt	Frankonia-Suzuki	Suzuki	Did not start	
DNQ	(Spain) José Parra		Honda	Did not qualify	
DNQ	(Italy) Vincenzo Cascino		Suzuki	Did not qualify	
DNQ	(Spain) Carlos Morante		Honda	Did not qualify	
DNQ	(Spain) Stelio Marmaras		Suzuki	Did not qualify	

Previous race: 1985 San Marino Grand Prix	FIM Grand Prix World Championship; 1986 season	Next race: 1986 Italian Grand Prix
Previous race: 1985 Spanish Grand Prix	Spanish Grand Prix	Next race: 1987 Spanish Grand Prix
