= 1986 San Marino motorcycle Grand Prix =

1986 Motorcycle race

1986 San Marino Grand Prix
Race details
- Race 11 of 12 races in the 1986 Grand Prix motorcycle racing season
- Date: 24 August 1986
- Official name: Grand Prix San Marino
- Location: Circuito Internazionale Santa Monica
- Course: Permanent racing facility; 3.488 km (2.167 mi)

500cc
Pole position
- Rider: (United States) Eddie Lawson
- Time: 1:19.310
Fastest lap
- Rider: (United States) Eddie Lawson
- Time: 1:20.200
Podium
- First: (United States) Eddie Lawson
- Second: (Australia) Wayne Gardner
- Third: (United States) Randy Mamola

250cc
Pole position
- Rider: (Venezuela) Carlos Lavado
- Time: 1:20.830
Fastest lap
- Rider: (Venezuela) Carlos Lavado
- Time: 1:22.200
Podium
- First: (Japan) Tadahiko Taira
- Second: (Spain) Sito Pons
- Third: (France) Dominique Sarron

125cc
Pole position
- Rider: (Italy) Fausto Gresini
- Time: 1:24.710
Fastest lap
- Rider: (Austria) August Auinger
- Time: 1:24.730
Podium
- First: (Austria) August Auinger
- Second: (Italy) Luca Cadalora
- Third: (Italy) Fausto Gresini

80cc
Pole position
- Rider: (Spain) Jorge Martínez
Fastest lap
- Rider: (Italy) Pier Paolo Bianchi
Podium
- First: (Italy) Pier Paolo Bianchi
- Second: (Spain) Jorge Martínez
- Third: (Spain) Manuel Herreros

The 1986 San Marino motorcycle Grand Prix was the eleventh race of the 1986 Grand Prix motorcycle racing season. It took place on 22–24 August 1986 at the Circuito Internazionale Santa Monica.

== Classification ==
=== 500 cc ===
Pos.	Rider	Team	Manufacturer	Time/Retired	Points
1	(United States) Eddie Lawson	Marlboro Yamaha Team Agostini	Yamaha	47'30.830	15
2	(Australia) Wayne Gardner	Rothmans Team HRC	Honda	+9.870	12
3	(United States) Randy Mamola	Team Lucky Strike Roberts	Yamaha	+18.960	10
4	(United States) Mike Baldwin	Team Lucky Strike Roberts	Yamaha	+20.740	8
5	(France) Raymond Roche	Racing Team Katayama	Honda	+37.660	6
6	(France) Christian Sarron	Team Gauloises Blondes Yamaha	Yamaha	+41.290	5
7	(Belgium) Didier de Radiguès	Rollstar Honda Racing Team	Honda	+42.840	4
8	(United Kingdom) Niall Mackenzie	Skoal Bandit Heron Suzuki	Suzuki	+50.980	3
9	(United Kingdom) Ron Haslam	Team ROC	Honda	+1'04.280	2
10	(United States) Kevin Schwantz		Suzuki	+1 lap	1
11	(Japan) Shunji Yatsushiro	Team HRC	Honda	+1 lap	
12	(Italy) Leandro Beccheroni		Suzuki	+1 lap	
13	(Switzerland) Wolfgang Von Muralt	Frankonia-Suzuki	Suzuki	+1 lap	
14	(Italy) Vittorio Gibertini		Cagiva	+1 lap	
15	(France) Christian Le Liard	Team ROC	Honda	+1 lap	
16	(Luxembourg) Andreas Leuthe		Honda	+1 lap	
17	(Italy) Fabio Barchitta		Honda	+1 lap	
18	(Netherlands) Boet van Dulmen		Honda	+1 lap	
19	(West Germany) Manfred Fischer	Team Hein Gericke	Honda	+2 laps	
20	(Austria) Karl Truchsess		Honda	+2 laps	
21	(Italy) Vinicio Bogani		Honda	+2 laps	
22	(Finland) Eero Hyvärinen		Honda	+2 laps	
23	(Netherlands) Mile Pajic	Stichting Netherlands Racing Team	Honda	+2 laps	
24	(Brazil) Marco Greco		Honda	+2 laps	
Ret	(United Kingdom) Simon Buckmaster		Honda	Retired	
Ret	(Spain) Juan Garriga		Cagiva	Retired	
Ret	(Zimbabwe) Dave Petersen	HB Suzuki GP Team	Suzuki	Retired	
Ret	(Italy) Marco Marchesani		Suzuki	Retired	
Ret	(Italy) Armando Errico		Suzuki	Retired	
Ret	(Italy) Fabio Biliotti	Team Italia	Honda	Retired	
Ret	(Italy) Alessandro Valesi		Honda	Retired	
Ret	(Italy) Vittorio Scatola	Team Paton	Paton	Retired	
Ret	(United Kingdom) Rob McElnea	Marlboro Yamaha Team Agostini	Yamaha	Accident	
Ret	(Australia) Paul Lewis	Skoal Bandit Heron Suzuki	Suzuki	Retired	
Ret	(Switzerland) Marco Gentile	Fior	Fior	Retired	
DNS	(Italy) Massimo Messere		Suzuki	Did not start	
DNQ	(Netherlands) Henk van der Mark		Honda	Did not qualify	
DNQ	(Switzerland) Christopher Bürki		Honda	Did not qualify	
DNQ	(Denmark) Claus Wulff		Suzuki	Did not qualify	
DNQ	(Spain) Andres Perez Rubio		Suzuki	Did not qualify	
DNQ	(Austria) Josef Doppler	HRC Grieskirched	Honda	Did not qualify	
DNQ	(Austria) Dietmar Marehardt		Honda	Did not qualify	
DNQ	(Spain) Stelio Marmaras		Suzuki	Did not qualify	

Previous race: 1986 Swedish Grand Prix	FIM Grand Prix World Championship; 1986 season	Next race: 1986 Baden-Württemberg Grand Prix
Previous race: 1985 San Marino Grand Prix	San Marino Grand Prix	Next race: 1987 San Marino Grand Prix
