= 1986 Swedish motorcycle Grand Prix =

(Sweden) 1986 Swedish Grand Prix
Race details
- Race 10 of 12 races in the 1986 Grand Prix motorcycle racing season
- Date: 10 August 1986
- Official name: Swedish TT
- Location: Scandinavian Raceway
- Course: Permanent racing facility; 4.031 km (2.505 mi)

500cc
Pole position
- Rider: (Australia) Wayne Gardner
- Time: 1:36.350
Fastest lap
- Rider: Unknown
Podium
- First: (United States) Eddie Lawson
- Second: (Australia) Wayne Gardner
- Third: (United States) Mike Baldwin

250cc
Pole position
- Rider: Unknown
Fastest lap
- Rider: Unknown
Podium
- First: (Venezuela) Carlos Lavado
- Second: (Spain) Sito Pons
- Third: (France) Jean-François Baldé

125cc
Pole position
- Rider: Unknown
Fastest lap
- Rider: Unknown
Podium
- First: (Italy) Fausto Gresini
- Second: (Italy) Luca Cadalora
- Third: (Italy) Domenico Brigaglia

80cc
Pole position
- Rider: No 80cc was held
Fastest lap
- Rider: No 80cc was held
Podium
- First: No 80cc was held
- Second: No 80cc was held
- Third: No 80cc was held

The 1986 Swedish motorcycle Grand Prix was the tenth round of the 1986 Grand Prix motorcycle racing season. It took place on the weekend of 9–10 August at the Scandinavian Raceway.

== Classification ==
=== 500 cc ===
Pos.	Rider	Team	Manufacturer	Time/Retired	Points
1	(United States) Eddie Lawson	Marlboro Yamaha Team Agostini	Yamaha	48:59.330	15
2	(Australia) Wayne Gardner	Rothmans Team HRC	Honda	+16.040	12
3	(United States) Mike Baldwin	Team Lucky Strike Roberts	Yamaha	+18.440	10
4	(United Kingdom) Rob McElnea	Marlboro Yamaha Team Agostini	Yamaha	+19.560	8
5	(France) Raymond Roche	Racing Team Katayama	Honda	+42.240	6
6	(Belgium) Didier de Radiguès	Rollstar Honda Racing Team	Honda	+49.730	5
7	(United Kingdom) Niall Mackenzie	Skoal Bandit Heron Suzuki	Suzuki	+58.460	4
8	(United States) Randy Mamola	Team Lucky Strike Roberts	Yamaha	+1:09.410	3
9	(United Kingdom) Ron Haslam	Team ROC	Honda	+1 lap	2
10	(Switzerland) Wolfgang Von Muralt	Frankonia-Suzuki	Suzuki	+1 lap	1
11	(Switzerland) Marco Gentile	Fior	Fior	+1 lap	
12	(Sweden) Peter Linden		Honda	+1 lap	
13	(Netherlands) Boet van Dulmen		Honda	+1 lap	
14	(Japan) Shunji Yatsushiro	Team HRC	Honda	+1 lap	
15	(United Kingdom) Paul Iddon	Skoal Bandit Heron Suzuki	Suzuki	+1 lap	
16	(West Germany) Manfred Fischer	Team Hein Gericke	Honda	+1 lap	
17	(Netherlands) Henk van der Mark		Honda	+1 lap	
18	(United Kingdom) Simon Buckmaster		Honda	+1 lap	
19	(Finland) Eero Hyvärinen		Honda	+1 lap	
20	(United Kingdom) Alan Jeffrey		Suzuki	+1 lap	
21	(Netherlands) Mile Pajic	Stichting Netherlands Racing Team	Honda	+1 lap	
22	(Netherlands) Maarten Duyzers		Suzuki	+1 lap	
23	(Finland) Esko Kuparinen		Honda	+2 laps	
24	(Belgium) Paul Ramon		Suzuki	+2 laps	
25	(Denmark) Claus Wulff		Suzuki	+2 laps	
Ret	(Sweden) Åke Dahli		Suzuki	Retired	
Ret	(Italy) Fabio Biliotti	Team Italia	Honda	Accident	
Ret	(Sweden) Peter Sköld		Bakker-Honda	Retired	
Ret	(Austria) Dietmar Mayer		Honda	Retired	
Ret	(Finland) Ari Rämö		Suzuki	Retired	
Ret	(Sweden) Lars Johansson		Suzuki	Retired	
Ret	(France) Christian le Liard	Team ROC	Honda	Retired	
Ret	(West Germany) Helmut Schütz	Rallye Sport	Honda	Accident	
Ret	(Austria) Josef Doppler	HRC Grieskirched	Honda	Retired	
Ret	(Switzerland) Christopher Bürki		Honda	Retired	
Ret	(United Kingdom) Mark Phillips		Suzuki	Accident	
DNS	(Italy) Marco Papa		Honda	Did not start	
DNQ	(Sweden) Geir Hestmann		Suzuki	Did not qualify	
DNQ	(Sweden) Gunnar Bruhn		Yamaha	Did not qualify	
DNQ	(France) Patrick Salles		Suzuki	Did not qualify	

Previous race: 1986 British Grand Prix	FIM Grand Prix World Championship; 1986 season	Next race: 1986 San Marino Grand Prix
Previous race: 1985 Swedish Grand Prix	Swedish Grand Prix	Next race: 1987 Swedish Grand Prix
