= 1986 Nations motorcycle Grand Prix =

(Italy) 1986 Nations Grand Prix
Race details
- Race 2 of 12 races in the 1986 Grand Prix motorcycle racing season
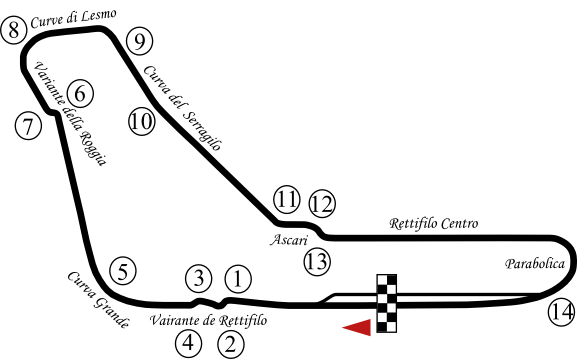
- Date: 18 May 1986
- Official name: Gran Premio d'Italia
- Location: Autodromo Nazionale Monza
- Course: Permanent racing facility; 5.800 km (3.604 mi)

500cc
Pole position
- Rider: (United States) Eddie Lawson
- Time: 1:49.950
Fastest lap
- Rider: (United States) Mike Baldwin
- Time: 1:49.310
Podium
- First: (United States) Eddie Lawson
- Second: (United States) Randy Mamola
- Third: (United States) Mike Baldwin

250cc
Pole position
- Rider: (West Germany) Martin Wimmer
- Time: 1:56.770
Fastest lap
- Rider: (Spain) Sito Pons
- Time: 1:57.160
Podium
- First: (West Germany) Martin Wimmer
- Second: (Venezuela) Carlos Lavado
- Third: (Italy) Fausto Ricci

125cc
Pole position
- Rider: (Italy) Fausto Gresini
- Time: 2:04.180
Fastest lap
- Rider: (Italy) Fausto Gresini
- Time: 2:04.570
Podium
- First: (Italy) Fausto Gresini
- Second: (Italy) Luca Cadalora
- Third: (Austria) August Auinger

80cc
Pole position
- Rider: (Switzerland) Stefan Dörflinger
- Time: 2:11.270
Fastest lap
- Rider: (United Kingdom) Ian McConnachie
Podium
- First: (Switzerland) Stefan Dörflinger
- Second: (Spain) Ángel Nieto
- Third: (Spain) Jorge Martínez

The 1986 Nations motorcycle Grand Prix was the second race of the 1986 Grand Prix motorcycle racing season. It took place on the weekend of 16–18 May 1986, at the Autodromo Nazionale Monza.

This was the last race of former world champion Marco Lucchinelli.

== Classification ==
=== 500 cc ===
Pos.	Rider	Team	Manufacturer	Time/Retired	Points
1	(United States) Eddie Lawson	Marlboro Yamaha Team Agostini	Yamaha	46'29.950	15
2	(United States) Randy Mamola	Team Lucky Strike Roberts	Yamaha	+5.680	12
3	(United States) Mike Baldwin	Team Lucky Strike Roberts	Yamaha	+7.630	10
4	(France) Christian Sarron	Team Gauloises Blondes Yamaha	Yamaha	+10.020	8
5	(Belgium) Didier de Radiguès	Rollstar Honda Racing Team	Honda	+49.000	6
6	(Netherlands) Boet van Dulmen		Honda	+1'43.950	5
7	(Italy) Pierfrancesco Chili	HB Suzuki GP Team	Honda	+1'53.380	4
8	(Italy) Fabio Biliotti	Team Italia	Honda	+1 lap	3
9	(Australia) Paul Lewis	Skoal Bandit Heron Suzuki	Suzuki	+1 lap	2
10	(Italy) Marco Papa		Honda	+1 lap	1
11	(Zimbabwe) Dave Petersen	HB Suzuki GP Team	Suzuki	+1 lap	
12	(Sweden) Peter Sköld		Bakker-Honda	+1 lap	
13	(Netherlands) Henk van der Mark		Honda	+1 lap	
14	(West Germany) Manfred Fischer	Team Hein Gericke	Honda	+1 lap	
15	(Austria) Karl Truchsess		Honda	+1 lap	
16	(Australia) Wayne Gardner	Rothmans Team HRC	Honda	+1 lap	
17	(Sweden) Peter Linden		Honda	+1 lap	
18	(Netherlands) Rob Punt		Honda	+1 lap	
19	(Italy) Marco Marchesani		Suzuki	+2 laps	
Ret	(United Kingdom) Rob McElnea	Marlboro Yamaha Team Agostini	Yamaha	Accident	
Ret	(Spain) Juan Garriga		Cagiva	Retired	
Ret	(United Kingdom) Ron Haslam	Team ROC	Honda	Retired	
Ret	(Luxembourg) Andreas Leuthe		Honda	Retired	
Ret	(Italy) Leandro Beccheroni		Suzuki	Retired	
Ret	(France) Raymond Roche	Racing Team Katayama	Honda	Accident	
Ret	(United States) Randy Mamola	Team Lucky Strike Roberts	Yamaha	Accident	
Ret	(Austria) Josef Doppler	HRC Grieskirched	Honda	Retired	
Ret	(United Kingdom) Roger Burnett	Rothmans Honda Britain	Honda	Retired	
Ret	(Switzerland) Marco Gentile	Fior	Fior	Retired	
Ret	(United Kingdom) Simon Buckmaster		Honda	Retired	
Ret	(Italy) Armando Errico		Suzuki	Retired	
Ret	(Italy) Alessandro Valesi		Honda	Retired	
Ret	(Italy) Vittorio Scatola	Team Paton	Paton	Retired	
Ret	(West Germany) Robert Jung		Honda	Retired	
Ret	(Italy) Marco Lucchinelli		Cagiva	Retired	
Ret	(Italy) Vinicio Bogani		Suzuki	Retired	
Ret	(Switzerland) Wolfgang Von Muralt	Frankonia-Suzuki	Suzuki	Retired	
DNQ	(Finland) Eero Hyvärinen		Honda	Did not qualify	
DNQ	(United Kingdom) David Griffith		Suzuki	Did not qualify	
DNQ	(Italy) Vincenzo Cascino		Suzuki	Did not qualify	

Previous race: 1986 Spanish Grand Prix	FIM Grand Prix World Championship; 1986 season	Next race: 1986 German Grand Prix
Previous race: 1985 Nations Grand Prix	Nations Grand Prix	Next race: 1987 Nations Grand Prix
