= 1986 Austrian motorcycle Grand Prix =

(Austria) 1986 Austrian Grand Prix
Race details
- Race 5 of 12 races in the 1986 Grand Prix motorcycle racing season
- Date: 8 June 1986
- Official name: Großer Preis von Österreich
- Location: Salzburgring
- Course: Permanent racing facility; 4.246 km (2.638 mi)

500cc
Pole position
- Rider: (United States) Eddie Lawson
- Time: 1:22.060
Fastest lap
- Rider: (United States) Eddie Lawson
- Time: 1:22.400
Podium
- First: (United States) Eddie Lawson
- Second: (Australia) Wayne Gardner
- Third: (United States) Randy Mamola

250cc
Pole position
- Rider: (Venezuela) Carlos Lavado
- Time: 1:27.880
Fastest lap
- Rider: (West Germany) Martin Wimmer
- Time: 1:27.180
Podium
- First: (Venezuela) Carlos Lavado
- Second: (West Germany) Martin Wimmer
- Third: (France) Jean-François Baldé

125cc
Pole position
- Rider: (Italy) Luca Cadalora
- Time: 1:33.640
Fastest lap
- Rider: (Italy) Ezio Gianola
- Time: 1:34.280
Podium
- First: (Italy) Luca Cadalora
- Second: (Italy) Ezio Gianola
- Third: (Switzerland) Bruno Kneubühler

80cc
Pole position
- Rider: (Spain) Jorge Martínez
- Time: 1:39.840
Fastest lap
- Rider: (United Kingdom) Ian McConnachie
- Time: 1:38.280
Podium
- First: (Spain) Jorge Martínez
- Second: (Spain) Manuel Herreros
- Third: (Italy) Pier Paolo Bianchi

The 1986 Austrian motorcycle Grand Prix was the fourth round of the 1986 Grand Prix motorcycle racing season. It took place on the weekend of 6–8 June 1986 at the Salzburgring.

== Classification ==
=== 500 cc ===
Pos.	Rider	Team	Manufacturer	Time/Retired	Points
1	(United States) Eddie Lawson	Marlboro Yamaha Team Agostini	Yamaha	41'43.790	15
2	(Australia) Wayne Gardner	Rothmans Team HRC	Honda	+11.500	12
3	(United States) Randy Mamola	Team Lucky Strike Roberts	Yamaha	+22.130	10
4	(France) Christian Sarron	Team Gauloises Blondes Yamaha	Yamaha	+25.730	8
5	(United States) Mike Baldwin	Team Lucky Strike Roberts	Yamaha	+26.360	6
6	(United Kingdom) Rob McElnea	Marlboro Yamaha Team Agostini	Yamaha	+27.420	5
7	(Japan) Shunji Yatsushiro	Team HRC	Honda	+50.380	4
8	(West Germany) Gustav Reiner	Honda Deutschland	Honda	+1'24.830	3
9	(Italy) Pierfrancesco Chili	HB Suzuki GP Team	Honda	+1 lap	2
10	(Netherlands) Boet van Dulmen		Honda	+1 lap	1
11	(Italy) Fabio Biliotti	Team Italia	Honda	+1 lap	
12	(Zimbabwe) Dave Petersen	HB Suzuki GP Team	Suzuki	+1 lap	
13	(West Germany) Manfred Fischer	Team Hein Gericke	Honda	+1 lap	
14	(Australia) Paul Lewis	Skoal Bandit Heron Suzuki	Suzuki	+1 lap	
15	(Switzerland) Wolfgang Von Muralt	Frankonia-Suzuki	Suzuki	+1 lap	
16	(United States) Freddie Spencer	Rothmans Team HRC	Honda	+1 lap	
17	(Netherlands) Henk van der Mark		Honda	+1 lap	
18	(Netherlands) Mile Pajic	Stichting Netherlands Racing Team	Honda	+1 lap	
19	(United Kingdom) Simon Buckmaster		Honda	+1 lap	
20	(Italy) Leandro Beccheroni		Suzuki	+2 laps	
21	(Finland) Eero Hyvärinen		Honda	+2 laps	
22	(West Germany) Robert Jung		Honda	+2 laps	
23	(Austria) Dietmar Mayer		Honda	+2 laps	
24	(Austria) Rudolf Zeller		Honda	+3 laps	
Ret	(Switzerland) Marco Gentile	Fior	Fior	Retired	
Ret	(Belgium) Didier de Radiguès	Rollstar Honda Racing Team	Honda	Accident	
Ret	(Spain) Juan Garriga		Cagiva	Retired	
Ret	(West Germany) Helmut Schütz	Rallye Sport	Honda	Retired	
Ret	(Austria) Josef Doppler	HRC Grieskirched	Honda	Retired	
Ret	(France) Raymond Roche	Racing Team Katayama	Honda	Retired	
Ret	(United Kingdom) Ron Haslam	Team ROC	Honda	Retired	
Ret	(Sweden) Peter Linden		Honda	Retired	
Ret	(Sweden) Peter Sköld	Bakker-Honda	Honda	Retired	
DNS	(Luxembourg) Andreas Leuthe		Honda	Did not start	
DNS	(Austria) Dietmar Marehardt		Honda	Did not start	
DNQ	(Italy) Vincenzo Cascino		Suzuki	Did not qualify	
DNQ	(Spain) Pablo Esposito		Honda	Did not qualify	

Previous race: 1986 German Grand Prix	FIM Grand Prix World Championship; 1986 season	Next race: 1986 Yugoslavian Grand Prix
Previous race: 1985 Austrian Grand Prix	Austrian Grand Prix	Next race: 1987 Austrian Grand Prix
