= 1986 Dutch TT =

(Netherlands) 1986 Dutch TT
Race details
- Race 6 of 12 races in the 1986 Grand Prix motorcycle racing season
- Date: 28 June 1986
- Official name: Dutch TT
- Location: TT Circuit Assen
- Course: Permanent racing facility; 6.049 km (3.759 mi)

500cc
Pole position
- Rider: (United States) Eddie Lawson
- Time: 2:12.700
Fastest lap
- Rider: (Australia) Wayne Gardner
- Time: 2:14.280
Podium
- First: (Australia) Wayne Gardner
- Second: (United States) Randy Mamola
- Third: (United States) Mike Baldwin

250cc
Pole position
- Rider: (Venezuela) Carlos Lavado
- Time: 2:18.180
Fastest lap
- Rider: (West Germany) Martin Wimmer
- Time: 2:19.070
Podium
- First: (Venezuela) Carlos Lavado
- Second: (West Germany) Anton Mang
- Third: (Spain) Sito Pons

125cc
Pole position
- Rider: (Italy) Luca Cadalora
- Time: 2:26.550
Fastest lap
- Rider: (Italy) Fausto Gresini
- Time: 2:26.430
Podium
- First: (Italy) Luca Cadalora
- Second: (Italy) Fausto Gresini
- Third: (Italy) Ezio Gianola

80cc
Pole position
- Rider: (Spain) Jorge Martínez
- Time: 2:33.150
Fastest lap
- Rider: (United Kingdom) Ian McConnachie
- Time: 2:30.790
Podium
- First: (Spain) Jorge Martínez
- Second: (Spain) Manuel Herreros
- Third: (Netherlands) Hans Spaan

The 1986 Dutch TT was the sixth round of the 1986 Grand Prix motorcycle racing season. It took place on the weekend of 26–28 June 1986 at the TT Circuit Assen located in Assen, Netherlands.

== Classification ==
=== 500 cc ===
Pos.	Rider	Team	Manufacturer	Time/Retired	Points
1	Wayne Gardner	Rothmans Team HRC	Honda	45'17.780	15
2	Randy Mamola	Team Lucky Strike Roberts	Yamaha	+3.630	12
3	Mike Baldwin	Team Lucky Strike Roberts	Yamaha	+10.060	10
4	Rob McElnea	Marlboro Yamaha Team Agostini	Yamaha	+10.140	8
5	Christian Sarron	Team Gauloises Blondes Yamaha	Yamaha	+20.430	6
6	Raymond Roche	Racing Team Katayama	Honda	+32.640	5
7	Ron Haslam	Team ROC	Honda	+39.960	4
8	Roger Burnett	Rothmans Honda Britain	Honda	+47.250	3
9	Didier de Radiguès	Rollstar Honda Racing Team	Honda	+1'07.700	2
10	Juan Garriga		Cagiva	+1'34.320	1
11	Marco Gentile	Fior	Fior	+1'51.400	
12	Boet van Dulmen		Honda	+1'55.110	
13	Wolfgang Von Muralt	Frankonia-Suzuki	Suzuki	+2'21.370	
14	Masuru Mizutani	Walter Wolf Racing	Suzuki	+1 lap	
15	Simon Buckmaster		Honda	+1 lap	
16	Mile Pajic	Stichting Netherlands Racing Team	Honda	+1 lap	
17	Manfred Fischer	Team Hein Gericke	Honda	+1 lap	
18	Marco Papa		Honda	+1 lap	
19	Eero Hyvärinen		Honda	+1 lap	
20	Rob Punt		Honda	+1 lap	
21	Esko Kuparinen		Honda	+1 lap	
22	Dietmar Mayer		Honda	+1 lap	
Ret	Peter Sköld		Bakker-Honda	Retired	
Ret	Kevin Schwantz		Suzuki	Accident	
Ret	Maarten Duyzers		Suzuki	Retired	
Ret	Mark Phillips		Suzuki	Retired	
Ret	(Sweden) Peter Linden		Honda	Retired	
Ret	Massimo Messere		Honda	Accident	
Ret	Dave Petersen	HB Suzuki GP Team	Suzuki	Accident	
Ret	Gustav Reiner	Honda Deutschland	Honda	Accident	
Ret	Kenny Irons		Yamaha	Accident	
Ret	Ray Swann		Suzuki	Retired	
Ret	Paul Lewis	Skoal Bandit Heron Suzuki	Suzuki	Accident	
Ret	Shunji Yatsushiro	Team HRC	Honda	Accident	
Ret	Karl Truchsess		Honda	Retired	
Ret	Eddie Lawson	Marlboro Yamaha Team Agostini	Yamaha	Accident	
DNQ	Hennie Boerman		Suzuki	Did not qualify	
DNQ	David Griffith		Suzuki	Did not qualify	
DNQ	Andreas Leuthe		Honda	Did not qualify	
DNQ	Bohumil Staša		Honda	Did not qualify	
DNQ	Helmut Schütz	Rallye Sport	Honda	Did not qualify	
DNQ	Philippe Robinet		Honda	Did not qualify	

Previous race: 1986 Yugoslavian Grand Prix	FIM Grand Prix World Championship; 1986 season	Next race: 1986 Belgian Grand Prix
Previous race: 1985 Dutch TT	Dutch TT	Next race: 1987 Dutch TT
