= 1986 German motorcycle Grand Prix =

(West Germany) 1986 German Grand Prix
Race details
- Race 3 of 12 races in the 1986 Grand Prix motorcycle racing season
- Date: 25 May 1986
- Official name: Grosser Preis von Deutschland
- Location: Nürburgring
- Course: Permanent racing facility; 4.542 km (2.822 mi)

500cc
Pole position
- Rider: (United States) Eddie Lawson
- Time: 1:42.560
Fastest lap
- Rider: Unknown
Podium
- First: (United States) Eddie Lawson
- Second: (Australia) Wayne Gardner
- Third: (United States) Mike Baldwin

250cc
Pole position
- Rider: (Venezuela) Carlos Lavado
- Time: 1:47.690
Fastest lap
- Rider: Unknown
Podium
- First: (Venezuela) Carlos Lavado
- Second: (West Germany) Anton Mang
- Third: (West Germany) Martin Wimmer

125cc
Pole position
- Rider: (Italy) Luca Cadalora
- Time: 1:51.610
Fastest lap
- Rider: Unknown
Podium
- First: (Italy) Luca Cadalora
- Second: (Italy) Fausto Gresini
- Third: (Italy) Ezio Gianola

80cc
Pole position
- Rider: (Switzerland) Stefan Dörflinger
- Time: 1:57.960
Fastest lap
- Rider: Unknown
Podium
- First: (Spain) Manuel Herreros
- Second: (Switzerland) Stefan Dörflinger
- Third: (United Kingdom) Ian McConnachie

The 1986 German motorcycle Grand Prix was the third round of the 1986 Grand Prix motorcycle racing season. It took place on the weekend of 23–25 May 1986 at the Nürburgring.

== Classification ==
=== 500 cc ===
Pos.	Rider	Team	Manufacturer	Time/Retired	Points
1	(United States) Eddie Lawson	Marlboro Yamaha Team Agostini	Yamaha	52'11.450	15
2	(Australia) Wayne Gardner	Rothmans Team HRC	Honda	+12.800	12
3	(United States) Mike Baldwin	Team Lucky Strike Roberts	Yamaha	+13.400	10
4	(United Kingdom) Rob McElnea	Marlboro Yamaha Team Agostini	Yamaha	+29.010	8
5	(Belgium) Didier de Radiguès	Rollstar Honda Racing Team	Honda	+35.780	6
6	(United States) Randy Mamola	Team Lucky Strike Roberts	Yamaha	+51.870	5
7	(France) Raymond Roche	Racing Team Katayama	Honda	+1'22.650	4
8	(United Kingdom) Ron Haslam	Team ROC	Honda	+1'26.740	3
9	(West Germany) Gustav Reiner	Honda Deutschland	Honda	+1'27.070	2
10	(Zimbabwe) Dave Petersen	HB Suzuki GP Team	Suzuki	+1'27.490	1
11	(West Germany) Manfred Fischer	Team Hein Gericke	Honda	+1 lap	
12	(Australia) Paul Lewis	Skoal Bandit Heron Suzuki	Suzuki	+1 lap	
13	(Netherlands) Boet van Dulmen		Honda	+1 lap	
14	(Italy) Fabio Biliotti	Team Italia	Honda	+1 lap	
15	(Netherlands) Henk van der Mark		Honda	+1 lap	
16	(Italy) Pierfrancesco Chili	HB Suzuki GP Team	Honda	+1 lap	
17	(Switzerland) Wolfgang Von Muralt	Frankonia-Suzuki	Suzuki	+1 lap	
18	(United Kingdom) Simon Buckmaster		Honda	+1 lap	
19	(West Germany) Gerold Fischer		Honda	+2 laps	
20	(Netherlands) Rob Punt		Honda	+2 laps	
21	(West Germany) Robert Jung		Honda	+2 laps	
22	(Netherlands) Maarten Duyzers		Honda	+2 laps	
23	(West Germany) Bernd Steif		Honda	+2 laps	
24	(Luxembourg) Andreas Leuthe		Honda	+2 laps	
25	(West Germany) Thomas Lange		Suzuki	+2 laps	
26	(West Germany) Dietmar Mayer		Honda	+2 laps	
27	(Austria) Josef Doppler	HRC Grieskirched	Honda	+2 laps	
28	(West Germany) Helmut Schütz	Rallye Sport	Honda	+2 laps	
29	(France) Philippe Robinet		Honda	+4 laps	
Ret	(France) Christian Sarron	Team Gauloises Blondes Yamaha	Yamaha	Accident	
Ret	(Netherlands) Mile Pajic	Stichting Netherlands Racing Team	Honda	Accident	
Ret	(Czechoslovakia) Bohumil Staša		Honda	Retired	
Ret	(West Germany) Rolf Aljes		Honda	Retired	
Ret	(Czechoslovakia) Pavol Dekánek		Suzuki	Retired	
Ret	(Finland) Eero Hyvärinen		Honda	Retired	
Ret	(Switzerland) Marco Gentile	Fior	Fior	Retired	
Ret	(Italy) Vincenzo Cascino		Suzuki	Retired	
Ret	(West Germany) Friedhelm Weber	Team Gauloises Blondes Yamaha	Honda	Retired	
Ret	(Spain) Juan Garriga	Stichting Netherlands Racing Team	Cagiva	Retired	
DNS	(Austria) Karl Truchsess		Honda	Did not start	
DNQ	(Spain) José Parra		Honda	Did not qualify	
DNQ	(Austria) Josef Ragginger		Suzuki	Did not qualify	

Previous race: 1986 Nations Grand Prix	FIM Grand Prix World Championship; 1986 season	Next race: 1986 Austrian Grand Prix
Previous race: 1985 German Grand Prix	German Grand Prix	Next race: 1987 German Grand Prix
