= 1987 Swedish motorcycle Grand Prix =

(Sweden) 1987 Swedish Grand Prix
Race details
- Race 13 of 15 races in the 1987 Grand Prix motorcycle racing season
- Date: 9 August 1987
- Official name: Swedish TT
- Location: Scandinavian Raceway
- Course: Permanent racing facility; 4.031 km (2.505 mi)

500cc
Pole position
- Rider: (Australia) Wayne Gardner
- Time: 1:35.720
Fastest lap
- Rider: Unknown
Podium
- First: (Australia) Wayne Gardner
- Second: (United States) Eddie Lawson
- Third: (United States) Randy Mamola

250cc
Pole position
- Rider: (Italy) Luca Cadalora
Fastest lap
- Rider: Unknown
Podium
- First: (West Germany) Anton Mang
- Second: (Italy) Luca Cadalora
- Third: (Italy) Loris Reggiani

125cc
Pole position
- Rider: (Italy) Fausto Gresini
Fastest lap
- Rider: Unknown
Podium
- First: (Italy) Fausto Gresini
- Second: (Italy) Bruno Casanova
- Third: (Italy) Domenico Brigaglia

The 1987 Swedish motorcycle Grand Prix was the tenth round of the 1987 Grand Prix motorcycle racing season. It took place on the weekend of 8–9 August at the Scandinavian Raceway.

== Classification ==
=== 500 cc ===
Pos.	Rider	Team	Manufacturer	Time/Retired	Points
1	(Australia) Wayne Gardner	Rothmans Honda Team	Honda	48'46.360	15
2	(United States) Eddie Lawson	Marlboro Yamaha Team Agostini	Yamaha	+2.200	12
3	(United States) Randy Mamola	Team Lucky Strike Roberts	Yamaha	+19.930	10
4	(United Kingdom) Rob McElnea	Marlboro Yamaha Team Agostini	Yamaha	+21.160	8
5	(United Kingdom) Niall Mackenzie	Team HRC	Honda	+29.660	6
6	(United Kingdom) Ron Haslam	Team ROC Elf Honda	Honda	+34.400	5
7	(United States) Freddie Spencer	Team HRC	Honda	+35.760	4
8	(Belgium) Didier de Radiguès	Cagiva-Bastos-Alstare	Cagiva	+42.640	3
9	(United Kingdom) Kenny Irons	Heron Suzuki GB	Suzuki	+46.730	2
10	(United Kingdom) Roger Burnett	Rothmans Honda Team	Honda	+51.230	1
11	(New Zealand) Richard Scott	Team Lucky Strike Roberts	Yamaha	+1'18.870	
12	(Italy) Fabio Biliotti		Honda	1'34.720	
13	(Japan) Tadahiko Taira	Marlboro Yamaha Team Agostini	Yamaha	+1'36.020	
14	(Switzerland) Bruno Kneubühler		Honda	+1 lap	
15	(West Germany) Manfred Fischer	Team Hein Gericke	Honda	+1 lap	
16	(Sweden) Peter Sköld		Honda	+1 lap	
17	(United Kingdom) Simon Buckmaster		Honda	+1 lap	
18	(San Marino) Fabio Barchitta		Honda	+1 lap	
19	(France) Louis-Luc Maisto		Honda	+1 lap	
20	(Netherlands) Maarten Duyzers		Honda	+1 lap	
21	(Switzerland) Marco Gentile	Fior	Fior	+1 lap	
22	(United Kingdom) Ray Swann		Honda	+1 lap	
23	(Finland) Ari Rämö		Honda	+2 laps	
24	(West Germany) Gerold Fischer		Honda	+1 lap	
25	(Norway) Geir Hestmann		Suzuki	+3 laps	
Ret	(Italy) Alessandro Valesi		Honda	Retired	
Ret	(Italy) Pierfrancesco Chili	HB Honda Gallina Team	Honda	Accident	
Ret	(Czechoslovakia) Pavol Dekánek		Suzuki	Retired	
Ret	(Switzerland) Wolfgang Von Muralt		Suzuki	Retired	
Ret	(Sweden) Peter Linden		Honda	Retired	
Ret	(Denmark) Claus Wulff		Suzuki	Retired	
Ret	(France) Christian Sarron	Sonauto Gauloises Jack Germain	Yamaha	Accident	
Ret	(France) Hervé Guilleux		Fior	Retired	
Ret	(Japan) Shunji Yatsushiro	Rothmans Honda Team	Honda	Accident	

Previous race: 1987 British Grand Prix	FIM Grand Prix World Championship; 1987 season	Next race: 1987 Czechoslovak Grand Prix
Previous race: 1986 Swedish Grand Prix	Swedish Grand Prix	Next race: 1988 Swedish Grand Prix
