= Domenico Brigaglia =

Italian motorcycle racer (born 1958)

- Nationality: Italian
- Born: 12 June 1958 (age 68); Sassari, Italy
Motorcycle racing career statistics
Grand Prix motorcycle racing
Active years	1982 - 1990
First race	1982 125cc Nations Grand Prix
Last race	1990 125cc British Grand Prix
First win	1986 125cc Belgian Grand Prix
Last win	1986 125cc Belgian Grand Prix
Starts / Wins / Podiums / Poles / F. laps / Points; 64 / 1 / 9 / 1 / 2 / 311

Domenico Brigaglia (born 12 June 1958 in Sassari) is an Italian former Grand Prix motorcycle road racer. His best year was in 1986, when he won the 125cc Belgian Grand Prix and finished in third place in the 125cc world championship.
