= 1986 Baden-Württemberg motorcycle Grand Prix =

Sports event in Germany

1986 Baden-Württemberg Grand Prix
Race details
- Race 12 of 12 races in the 1986 Grand Prix motorcycle racing season
- Date: 28 September 1986
- Location: Hockenheimring
- Course: Permanent racing facility; 6.797 km (4.223 mi)

125cc
Pole position
| Rider | (Italy) Fausto Gresini | Garelli |
| Time | 2:22.940 | |
Fastest lap
| Rider | (Italy) Luca Cadalora | Garelli |
| Time | 2:22.140 | |
Podium
| First | (Italy) Fausto Gresini | Garelli |
| Second | (Italy) Luca Cadalora | Garelli |
| Third | (Austria) August Auinger | MBA |

80cc
Pole position
| Rider | (Germany) Gerhard Waibel | Real-Krauser |
| Time | 2:30.930 | |
Fastest lap
| Rider | (Switzerland) Stefan Dörflinger | Krauser |
Podium
| First | (Germany) Gerhard Waibel | Real-Krauser |
| Second | (Switzerland) Stefan Dörflinger | Krauser |
| Third | (Netherlands) Hans Spaan | HuVo-Casal |

Sidecar (B2A)
Pole position
| Rider | (Netherlands) Egbert Streuer | LCR-Yamaha |
| Passenger | (Netherlands) Bernard Schnieders | |
Fastest lap
| Rider | (Switzerland) Rolf Biland | LCR-Krauser |
| Passenger | (Switzerland) Kurt Waltisperg | |
Podium
| First rider | (Netherlands) Egbert Streuer | LCR-Yamaha |
| First passenger | (Netherlands) Bernard Schnieders | |
| Second rider | (Switzerland) Rolf Biland | LCR-Krauser |
| Second passenger | (Switzerland) Kurt Waltisperg | |
| Third rider | (United Kingdom) Steve Webster | LCR-Yamaha |
| Third passenger | (United Kingdom) Tony Hewitt | |

The 1986 Baden-Württemberg motorcycle Grand Prix was an additional event for 80cc, 125cc and sidecar classes that counted towards the 1986 Motorcycle Grand Prix season. It took place on the weekend of 28 September 1986 at the Hockenheimring, in the German state of Baden-Württemberg.

== 125 cc Classification ==
| Pos | Rider | Manufacturer | Time/Retired | Points |
|---|---|---|---|---|
| 1 | (Italy) Fausto Gresini | Garelli | 33:46.460 | 15 |
| 2 | (Italy) Luca Cadalora | Garelli | +0.83 | 12 |
| 3 | (Austria) August Auinger | MBA | +1.06 | 10 |
| 4 | (Italy) Ezio Gianola | MBA | +1.26 | 8 |
| 5 | (Switzerland) Bruno Kneubühler | MBA | +2.23 | 6 |
| 6 | (Italy) Domenico Brigaglia | Ducados | +31.99 | 5 |
| 7 | (Italy) Paolo Casoli | MBA | +47.46 | 4 |
| 8 | (Belgium) Oliver Liégeois | Assmex | +52.85 | 3 |
| 9 | (Finland) Johnny Wickström | Tunturi | +53.07 | 2 |
| 10 | (Germany) Adolf Stadler | MBA | +53.39 | 1 |

== 80 cc Classification ==
| Pos | Rider | Manufacturer | Time/Retired | Points |
|---|---|---|---|---|
| 1 | (Germany) Gerhard Waibel | Real-Krauser | | 15 |
| 2 | (Switzerland) Stefan Dörflinger | Krauser | | 12 |
| 3 | (Netherlands) Hans Spaan | HuVo-Casal | | 10 |
| 4 | (Spain) Manuel Herreros | Derbi | | 8 |
| 5 | (Netherlands) Wilco Zeelenberg | Casal | | 6 |
| 6 | (Germany) Hubert Abold | Krauser | | 5 |
| 7 | (Germany) Rainer Scheidhauer | Seel | | 4 |
| 8 | (Germany) Alfred Waibel | Krauser | | 3 |
| 9 | (Netherlands) Henk van Kessel | Krauser | | 2 |
| 10 | (Netherlands) Theo Timmer | HuVo-Casal | | 1 |

== Sidecar Classification ==
| Pos | Rider | Passenger | Manufacturer | Time/Retired | Points |
|---|---|---|---|---|---|
| 1 | (Netherlands) Egbert Streuer | (Netherlands) Bernard Schnieders | LCR-Yamaha | | 15 |
| 2 | (Switzerland) Rolf Biland | (Switzerland) Kurt Waltisperg | LCR-Krauser | | 15 |
| 3 | (United Kingdom) Steve Webster | (United Kingdom) Tony Hewitt | LCR-Yamaha | | 10 |
| 4 | (Switzerland) Alfred Zurbrügg | (Switzerland) Martin Zurbrügg | LCR-Yamaha | | 8 |
| 5 | (France) Alain Michel | (France) Jean-Marc Fresc | LCR-Yamaha | | 6 |
| 6 | (Japan) Masato Kumano | (Germany) Helmut Diehl | LCR-Yamaha | | 5 |
| 7 | (United Kingdom) Steve Abbott | (United Kingdom) Shaun Smith | Windle-Yamaha | | 4 |
| 8 | (United Kingdom) Frank Wrathall | (United Kingdom) Kerry Chapman | LCR-Yamaha | | 3 |
| 9 | (Switzerland) Markus Egloff | (Switzerland) Urs Egloff | LCR-Yamaha | | 2 |
| 10 | (United Kingdom) Derek Bailey | (United Kingdom) Brian Nixon | LCR-Yamaha | | 1 |

== Notes ==
It was Angel Nieto final race in 125cc class and in overall class

| Previous race: 1986 San Marino Grand Prix | FIM Grand Prix World Championship; 1986 season | Next race: 1987 Japanese Grand Prix |
| Previous race: None | Baden-Württemberg Grand Prix | Next race: None |
