= Manfred Herweh =

German motorcycle racer

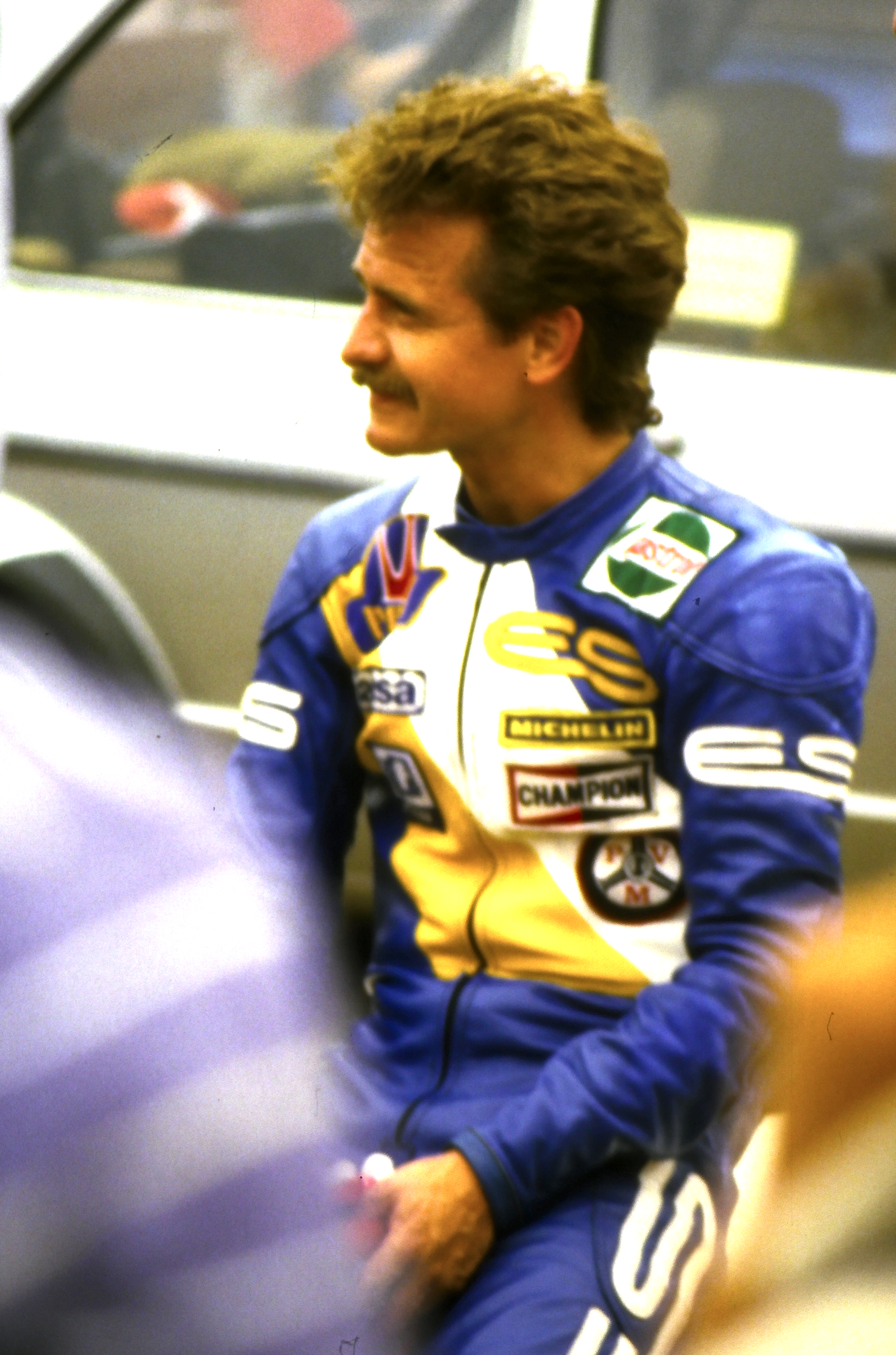
- Herweh in 1984
- Nationality: German
- Born: 14 June 1954 (age 72); Lampertheim, West Germany
Motorcycle racing career statistics
Grand Prix motorcycle racing
Active years	1982 - 1989
First race	1982 250cc German Grand Prix
Last race	1989 250cc Czechoslovakian Grand Prix
First win	1982 350cc German Grand Prix
Last win	1984 250cc San Marino Grand Prix
Team	Real-Rotax
Championships	0
Starts / Wins / Podiums / Poles / F. laps / Points; 65 / 6 / 12 / 3 / 3 / 244

Manfred Herweh (born 14 June 1954) is a German former professional motorcycle racer. He competed in Grand Prix motorcycle road racing from 1982 to 1989.

== Motorcycle racing career ==
Herweh was born in Lampertheim, Hesse, Germany. He is notable for being the last competitor to win a 350cc Grand Prix race, at the 1982 German Grand Prix. He had his best year in 1984 when he won four races riding a Rotax-powered Real 250cc motorcycle. Herweh ended the season in second place behind Christian Sarron. He retired after the 1989 season.

From 1984, Herweh constructed motorcycles using frames from Nico Bakker and Rotax engines. These motorcycles competed in Grand Prix motorcycle racing using the chassis name "Real", due to a sponsorship agreement with a German hypermarket of the same name. Herweh's 1984 Grand Prix-winning motorcycle is on display at the Sinsheim Automobile and Technical Museum in Sinsheim, Germany.

== Motorcycle Grand Prix results ==
Points system from 1969 to 1987:

**Position**	1	2	3	4	5	6	7	8	9	10
**Points**	15	12	10	8	6	5	4	3	2	1

Points system from 1988 to 1992:

**Position**	1	2	3	4	5	6	7	8	9	10	11	12	13	14	15
**Points**	20	17	15	13	11	10	9	8	7	6	5	4	3	2	1

(key) (Races in bold indicate pole position; races in italics indicate fastest lap)

Year	Class	Team	1	2	3	4	5	6	7	8	9	10	11	12	13	14	15	Points	Rank	Wins
1982	250cc	Yamaha			FRA -	ESP -	NAT -	NED -	BEL -	YUG -	GBR -	SWE -	FIN -	CZE -	RSM -	GER; 7		4	26th	0
1982	350cc	Yamaha	ARG -	AUT -	FRA -		NAT -	NED -			GBR -		FIN -	CZE -		GER; 1		15	13th	1
1983	250cc	Real-Rotax	RSA; 6	FRA -	NAT; 3	GER; NC	ESP; 21	AUT; 1	YUG; 3	NED; NC	BEL; NC	GBR -	SWE -					40	7th	1
1984	250cc	Real-Rotax	RSA; 4	NAT; 9	ESP; 12	AUT; NC	GER; 3	FRA; 3	YUG; 1	NED; 3	**BEL**; 1	**GBR**; NC	**SWE**; 1	RSM; 1				100	2nd	4
1985	250cc	Real-Rotax	RSA; NC	ESP -	GER -	NAT -	AUT -	YUG -	NED; 23	BEL; 6	FRA; 4	GBR; 3	SWE; NC	RSM; 4				31	8th	0
1986	250cc	Aprilia-Rotax	ESP; 14	NAT; 14	GER; NC	AUT; 7	YUG; 8	NED; NC	BEL; NC	FRA; NC	GBR -	SWE -	RSM -					7	19th	0
1987	250cc	Honda	JPN; NC	ESP; 15	GER -	NAT; 18	AUT; 17	YUG; 13	NED; 11	FRA; 5	GBR; 10	SWE; NC	CZE; NC	RSM; 8	POR; 10	BRA -	ARG -	11	15th	0
1988	250cc	Yamaha	JPN -	USA -	ESP; 10	EXP; 10	NAT; 12	GER; NC	AUT; 8	NED; 10	BEL; NC	YUG; NC	FRA -	GBR; NC	SWE -	CZE; 24	BRA; 11	35	15th	0
1989	250cc	Yamaha	JPN -	AUS -	USA -	ESP -	NAT -	GER -	AUT; 25	YUG -	NED -	BEL; 23	FRA -	GBR; 22	SWE; 17	CZE; 15	BRA -	1	41st	0
