= 1984 San Marino motorcycle Grand Prix =

Motorcycle race

1984 San Marino Grand Prix
Race details
- Race 12 of 12 races in the 1984 Grand Prix motorcycle racing season
- Date: 2 September 1984
- Official name: Grand Prix San Marino
- Location: Autodromo Internazionale del Mugello
- Course: Permanent racing facility; 5.245 km (3.259 mi)

500cc
Pole position
- Rider: (France) Raymond Roche
- Time: 2:03.180
Fastest lap
- Rider: (United States) Randy Mamola
- Time: 2:03.750
Podium
- First: (United States) Randy Mamola
- Second: (France) Raymond Roche
- Third: (United Kingdom) Ron Haslam

250cc
Pole position
- Rider: (Venezuela) Carlos Lavado
- Time: 2:06.460
Fastest lap
- Rider: (West Germany) Martin Wimmer
- Time: 2:07.220
Podium
- First: (West Germany) Manfred Herweh
- Second: (Venezuela) Carlos Lavado
- Third: (Switzerland) Jacques Cornu

125cc
Pole position
- Rider: (Italy) Maurizio Vitali
- Time: 2:11.800
Fastest lap
- Rider: (Spain) Ángel Nieto
- Time: 2:09.660
Podium
- First: (Italy) Maurizio Vitali
- Second: (Italy) Eugenio Lazzarini
- Third: (Italy) Fausto Gresini

80cc
Pole position
- Rider: (Switzerland) Stefan Dörflinger
Fastest lap
- Rider: (Spain) Jorge Martínez
Podium
- First: (West Germany) Gerhard Waibel
- Second: (Spain) Jorge Martínez
- Third: (West Germany) Hubert Abold

The 1984 San Marino motorcycle Grand Prix was the final race of the 1984 Grand Prix motorcycle racing season. It took place on 1–2 September 1984 at the Mugello Circuit.

== Classification ==
=== 500 cc ===
Pos.	Rider	Team	Manufacturer	Time/Retired	Points
1	(United States) Randy Mamola	RM Promotions	Honda	49'56.630	15
2	(France) Raymond Roche	Honda Total	Honda	+1.190	12
3	(United Kingdom) Ron Haslam	Honda Racing Corporation	Honda	+8.390	10
4	(United States) Eddie Lawson	Marlboro Team Agostini	Yamaha	+24.460	8
5	(Belgium) Didier de Radiguès	Team Elf Chevallier Johnson	Honda	+41.270	6
6	(United Kingdom) Rob McElnea	Heron Team Suzuki	Suzuki	+1'00.130	5
7	(Italy) Leandro Beccheroni		Suzuki	+1'00.690	4
8	(Italy) Franco Uncini	HB Suzuki GP Team	Suzuki	+1'05.750	3
9	(Netherlands) Boet van Dulmen		Suzuki	+1'29.510	2
10	(Italy) Armando Errico		Suzuki	+1'49.420	1
11	(Italy) Lorenzo Ghiselli		Suzuki	+1'50.620	
12	(Italy) Fabio Biliotti		Honda	+1'50.630	
13	(Finland) Eero Hyvärinen		Suzuki	+1 lap	
14	(Italy) Massimo Broccoli		Honda	+1 lap	
15	(Switzerland) Marco Gentile		Yamaha	+1 lap	
16	(Italy) Paolo Ferretti		Suzuki	+1 lap	
17	(Switzerland) Christopher Bürki	Romer Racing Suisse	Suzuki	+1 lap	
18	(Italy) Alessandro Valesi		Suzuki	+1 lap	
19	(United Kingdom) Gary Lingham		Suzuki	+1 lap	
20	(United Kingdom) Steve Parrish		Yamaha	+1 lap	
21	(United Kingdom) Keith Huewen	David Attwood	Honda	+2 laps	
Ret	(West Germany) Gustav Reiner	Olymp-Hemden Racing	Honda	Accident	
Ret	(West Germany) Reinhold Roth	Romer Racing Suisse	Honda	Retired	
Ret	(France) Christian le Liard	Team Elf Chevallier Johnson	Chevallier	Retired	
Ret	(Italy) Marco Papa		Honda	Retired	
Ret	(Austria) Karl Truchsess		Suzuki	Retired	
Ret	(United Kingdom) Barry Sheene	Heron Team Suzuki	Suzuki	Retired	
Ret	(Netherlands) Mile Pajic		Honda	Accident	
Ret	(Italy) Virginio Ferrari	Marlboro Team Agostini	Yamaha	Retired	
Ret	(Italy) Massimo Messere		Suzuki	Accident	
Ret	(France) Hervé Moineau	Cagiva Motor Italia	Cagiva	Accident	
Ret	(Switzerland) Wolfgang von Muralt	Frankonia-Suzuki	Suzuki	Retired	
Ret	(Netherlands) Rob Punt		Suzuki	Accident	
Ret	(Japan) Takazumi Katayama	Honda Racing Corporation	Honda	Retired	
DNS	(West Germany) Klaus Klein	Dieter Braun Team	Suzuki	Did not start	
DNS	(France) Pierre Bolle		Suzuki	Did not start	
DNS	(Australia) Wayne Gardner	Honda Britain	Honda	Did not start	
DNS	(Switzerland) Sergio Pellandini	HB Suzuki GP Team	Suzuki	Did not start	
DNQ	(France) Louis-Luc Maisto		Honda	Did not qualify	
DNQ	(Italy) Massimo Brutti		Suzuki	Did not qualify	
DNQ	(Luxembourg) Andreas Leuthe		Yamaha	Did not qualify	

Previous race: 1984 Swedish Grand Prix	FIM Grand Prix World Championship; 1984 season	Next race: 1985 South African Grand Prix
Previous race: 1983 San Marino Grand Prix	San Marino Grand Prix	Next race: 1985 San Marino Grand Prix
