= 1984 Grand Prix motorcycle racing season =

Sports season

The 1984 Grand Prix motorcycle racing season was the 36th F.I.M. Road Racing World Championship season.

== Season summary ==
Defending champion Freddie Spencer was the pre-season favorite to win the championship however, teething problems with Honda's new V4 and early season injuries squelched his hopes to repeat. In spite of his problems, Spencer still took five wins. Eddie Lawson lived up to his nickname of Steady Eddie with four wins and four second places to secure his first 500cc world championship on a Yamaha. Randy Mamola also had three wins to finish second on a factory backed Honda.

Yamaha also claimed the 250 crown with Frenchman Christian Sarron taking the honors ahead of a strong challenge from Real-Rotax mounted Manfred Herweh. Angel Nieto would win a thirteenth world championship with six wins in a row before sitting out the final two races. Stefan Dörflinger would be the first ever 80cc champion after the class displacement was increased from 50cc.

== 1984 Grand Prix season calendar ==
The following Grands Prix were scheduled to take place in 1984:

| Round | Date | Grand Prix | Circuit |
|---|---|---|---|
| 1 | 24 March †† | (South Africa) Technics Motorcycle Grand Prix | Kyalami |
| 2 | 15 April | (Italy) Gran Premio delle Nazioni | Circuito Internazionale Santa Monica |
| 3 | 6 May | (Spain) Marlboro Gran Premio de España | Circuito Permanente Del Jarama |
| 4 | 20 May | (Austria) Großer Preis von Österreich | Salzburgring |
| 5 | 27 May | (Germany) Großer Preis von Deutschland | Nürburgring |
| 6 | 11 June | Grand Prix de France Moto | Circuit Paul Ricard |
| 7 | 17 June | (Socialist Federal Republic of Yugoslavia) Yu Grand Prix | Automotodrom Rijeka |
| 8 | 30 June †† | (Netherlands) Dutch TT Assen | TT Circuit Assen |
| 9 | 8 July | Johnson GP of Belgium | Circuit de Spa-Francorchamps |
| 10 | 5 August | (United Kingdom) Marlboro British Grand Prix | Silverstone Circuit |
| 11 | 12 August | (Sweden) Swedish TT | Scandinavian Raceway |
| 12 | 2 September | Grand Prix San Marino | Autodromo Internazionale del Mugello |

†† = Saturday race

=== Calendar changes ===
- The French Grand Prix was moved back, from 3 April to 11 June.
- The French Grand Prix moved from the Bugatti Circuit in Le Mans to the Paul Ricard circuit.
- The Spanish Grand Prix was moved forward, from 22 to 6 May.

== Results ==
=== 1984 Grand Prix season results ===
| Round | Date | Race | Location | 80cc winner | 125cc winner | 250cc winner | 500cc winner | Report |
|---|---|---|---|---|---|---|---|---|
| 1 | 24 March | (South Africa) South African Grand Prix | Kyalami | | | (France) Patrick Fernandez | (United States) Eddie Lawson | Report |
| 2 | 15 April | (Italy) Italian Grand Prix | Misano | (Italy) Pier Paolo Bianchi | (Spain) Ángel Nieto | (Italy) Fausto Ricci | (United States) Freddie Spencer | Report |
| 3 | 6 May | (Spain) Spanish Grand Prix | Jarama | (Italy) Pier Paolo Bianchi | (Spain) Ángel Nieto | (Spain) Sito Pons | (United States) Eddie Lawson | Report |
| 4 | 20 May | (Austria) Austrian Grand Prix | Salzburgring | (Switzerland) Stefan Dörflinger | | (France) Christian Sarron | (United States) Eddie Lawson | Report |
| 5 | 27 May | (Germany) German Grand Prix | Nürburgring | (Switzerland) Stefan Dörflinger | (Spain) Ángel Nieto | (France) Christian Sarron | (United States) Freddie Spencer | Report |
| 6 | 11 June | (France) French Grand Prix | Paul Ricard | | (Spain) Ángel Nieto | (Germany) Anton Mang | (United States) Freddie Spencer | Report |
| 7 | 17 June | (Socialist Federal Republic of Yugoslavia) Yugoslavian Grand Prix | Rijeka | (Switzerland) Stefan Dörflinger | | (Germany) Manfred Herweh | (United States) Freddie Spencer | Report |
| 8 | 30 June | (Netherlands) Dutch TT | Assen | (Spain) Jorge Martínez | (Spain) Ángel Nieto | (Venezuela) Carlos Lavado | (United States) Randy Mamola | Report |
| 9 | 8 July | (Belgium) Belgian Grand Prix | Spa-Francorchamps | (Switzerland) Stefan Dörflinger | | (Germany) Manfred Herweh | (United States) Freddie Spencer | Report |
| 10 | 5 August | (United Kingdom) British Grand Prix | Silverstone | | (Spain) Ángel Nieto | (France) Christian Sarron | (United States) Randy Mamola | Report |
| 11 | 12 August | (Sweden) Swedish Grand Prix | Anderstorp | | (Italy) Fausto Gresini | (Germany) Manfred Herweh | (United States) Eddie Lawson | Report |
| 12 | 2 September | San Marino Grand Prix | Mugello | (Germany) Gerhard Waibel | (Italy) Maurizio Vitali | (Germany) Manfred Herweh | (United States) Randy Mamola | Report |

== Participants and standings ==
=== 500cc participants ===
| Team | Constructor | Motorcycle | No. | Rider | Rounds |
|---|---|---|---|---|---|
| Honda Racing Corporation | Honda | Honda NSR500; Honda NS500 | 1 | (United States) Freddie Spencer | 2, 4–9 |
| Honda Racing Corporation | Honda | Honda NS500 | 5 | (Japan) Takazumi Katayama | 6, 8, 10–12 |
| Honda Racing Corporation | Honda | Honda NS500 | 9 | (United Kingdom) Ron Haslam | All |
| R.M. Promotions Inc. | Honda | Honda NSR500; Honda NS500 | 3 | (United States) Randy Mamola | 3–12 |
| Marlboro Team Agostini | Yamaha | Yamaha YZR500 (OW76) | 4 | (United States) Eddie Lawson | All |
| Marlboro Team Agostini | Yamaha | Yamaha YZR500 (OW76) | 18; 51; 53 | (Italy) Virginio Ferrari | 1–2, 4–12 |
| Marlboro | Yamaha | Yamaha YZR500 (OW76) | 28 | (Japan) Tadahiko Taira | 8-9 |
| Heron Team Suzuki | Harris Suzuki | Suzuki XR45 | 7 | (United Kingdom) Barry Sheene | All |
| Heron Team Suzuki | Harris Suzuki | ??? | 45; 19; 52; 35 | (United Kingdom) Rob McElnea | 2, 4–6, 10–12 |
| Heron Team Suzuki | Harris Suzuki | ??? | 57 | (United Kingdom) Mick Grant | 10 |
| Cagiva Motor Italia S.p.A. | Cagiva | Cagiva C9 | 8 | (Italy) Marco Lucchinelli | 1–4, 8 |
| Cagiva Motor Italia S.p.A. | Cagiva | Cagiva C9 | 23 | (France) Hervé Moineau | 6–9, 12 |
| H.B. Suzuki G.P. Team | Suzuki | Suzuki XR45 | 10 | (Italy) Franco Uncini | 1–5, 10–12 |
| H.B. Suzuki G.P. Team | Suzuki | Suzuki XR45 | 15 | (Switzerland) Sergio Pellandini | 1–11 |
| Honda Total | Honda | Honda NS500 | 11 | (France) Raymond Roche | All |
| Toshiba | Suzuki | RG500 | 12 | (Netherlands) Boet van Dulmen | 1–6, 9–12 |
| Toshiba | Suzuki | RG500 | 45 | (Netherlands) Rob Punt | 2–12 |
| David Attwood | Honda | ?? | 16 | (United Kingdom) Keith Huewen | 2–6, 8–12 |
| Team Elf/Chevallier Johnson | Chevallier-Honda | NS500 | 17 | (Belgium) Didier de Radiguès | All |
| Team Elf/Chevallier Johnson | Chevallier-Honda | NS500 | 30; 31 | (France) Christian le Liard | 1, 3–5, 8–12 |
| Honda Britain Racing Team | Honda | Honda RS500 | 18; 53; 33 | (Australia) Wayne Gardner | 2, 8–11 |
| Honda Britain Racing Team | Honda | Honda RS500 | 51 | (United Kingdom) Roger Marshall | 10 |
| Dieter Braun Team | Suzuki | RG500 | 21 | (West Germany) Klaus Klein | ??? |
| ??? | Suzuki | RG500 | 22 | (Italy) Lorenzo Ghiselli | 2, 4–12 |
| Frankonia-Suzuki | Suzuki | RG500 | 25 | (Switzerland) Wolfgang von Muralt | 2–12 |
| Römer Racing Team | Honda | Honda RS500 | 26 | (West Germany) Reinhold Roth | All |
| Römer Racing Team | Honda | Honda RS500 | 62 | (Switzerland) Christoph Bürki | ??? |
| ??? | Honda | ??? | 30 | (Italy) Massimo Broccoli | 1–10, 12 |
| Yashica/Contax | Suzuki/Yamaha | ???/??? | 32 | (United States) Brett Hudson | 1, 3–6, 8–9 |
| Olymp-Hemden Racing | Honda | RS500 | 34 | (West Germany) Gustav Reiner | 1–3, 5, 8–9, 11–12 |
| ??? | Honda | RS500 | 35 | (Italy) Fabio Biliotti | 3–12 |
| Mitsui Yamaha | Yamaha | Yamaha TZ500 Harris | 37 | (United Kingdom) Steve Parrish | 2, 5, 8–12 |
| RG500 | Suzuki | ??? | 38 | (Italy) Leandro Becheroni | 2–12 |
| RG500 | Suzuki/Honda | ??? | 53 | (Italy) Paolo Ferretti | 4–7, 10–12 |
| RG500 | Honda | ??? | 56 | (France) Louis-Luc Maisto | ??? |
| Bill Smith Racing | Honda | RS500 | 113; 27 | (United Kingdom) Chris Guy | 1–5, 8 |

Key
Regular Rider
Wildcard Rider
Replacement Rider

=== 250cc participants ===
| Team | Constructor | Motorcycle | No. | Rider | Rounds |
|---|---|---|---|---|---|
| Venemotos Racing Team | Yamaha | ??? | 1 | (Venezuela) Carlos Lavado | All |
| Venemotos Racing Team | Yamaha | ??? | 18 | (Venezuela) Iván Palazzese | 1–3, 5–9, 11–12 |
| Team Sonauto Gauloises | Yamaha | ??? | 2 | (France) Christian Sarron | All |
| Team Sonauto Gauloises | Yamaha | ??? | 32 | (France) Jean-Michel Mattioli | All |
| Team Sonauto Gauloises | Yamaha | ??? | ?? | (France) Thierry Rapicault | 2, 4, 6, 8–12 |
| HB Team 250 | Yamaha | ??? | 3 | (West Germany) Anton Mang | All |
| ??? | Chevallier | ??? | 4 | (France) Hervé Guilleux | 1–6 |
| ??? | Chevallier/??? | ??? | 5 | (France) Thierry Espié | 1–3, 5–12 |
| Mitsui-Yamaha Racing Team | Yamaha | ??? | 6 | (West Germany) Martin Wimmer | All |
| Massa Real GmbH | Real-Rotax | ??? | 7 | (West Germany) Manfred Herweh | All |
| Pernod | Pernod | ??? | 8 | (France) Jean-François Baldé | 1–6, 8–12 |
| Pernod | Pernod | ??? | 10 | (France) Jacques Bolle | 1–6, 8–12 |
| Team Parisienne-Elf | Yamaha | ??? | 9 | (Switzerland) Jacques Cornu | All |
| Team Parisienne-Elf | Honda | Honda RS500 | 15 | (Switzerland) Roland Freymond | All |
| ??? | Yamaha | ??? | 12 | (France) Patrick Fernandez | All |
| Marlboro Team Roberts | Yamaha | ??? | 14 | (United Kingdom) Alan Carter | 1, 3–12 |
| Marlboro Team Roberts | Yamaha | ??? | 55; 29 | (United States) Wayne Rainey | All |
| ??? | Yamaha | ??? | 16 | (France) Thierry Rapicault | 2, 4, 6, 8–12 |
| ??? | Yamaha/Honda | ???/??? | 17 | (France) Jean-Louis Guignabodet | 1–3, 5, 8, 10–12 |
| JJ Cobas | Cobas | ??? | 20 | (Spain) Carlos Cardús | 2–3, 6-7, 9–12 |
| Team Hugin-Total | Yamaha | ??? | 21 | (Belgium) Stéphane Mertens | 1–5, 7–12 |
| Team Hugin-Total | Yamaha | ??? | 23 | (Belgium) Richard Hubin | 1, 3–12 |
| ??? | Yamaha | ??? | 22 | (Italy) Fausto Ricci | 2–6, 12 |
| ??? | Yamaha/ES | ???/??? | 24 | (West Germany) Harald Eckl | 1–2, 4–12 |
| ??? | Yamaha | ??? | 28 | (Japan) Teruo Fukuda | 2–5, 7–12 |
| Cobas Motorcycles | Cobas-Rotax | ??? | 30 | (Spain) Sito Pons | All |
| Römer Racing Team | Römer/??? | ???/??? | 31 | (West Germany) Karl Grässel | 1–2, 8–9 |
| Römer Racing Team | Yamaha | ??? | 39 | (Austria) Manfred Obinger | ??? |
| Dalmac Racing | Yamaha | ??? | 33; 36; 67 | (United Kingdom) Donnie Mcleod | 2–12 |
| ??? | Yamaha | ??? | 34 | (South Africa) Mario Rademeyer | 1–6, 9–10, 12 |
| ??? | Kawasaki | ??? | 36 | (Italy) Loris Reggiani | 3–5, 7, 12 |
| ??? | Yamaha | ??? | 37 | (Austria) Siegfried Minich | 4–5, 7–12 |
| ??? | Yamaha/??? | ???/??? | 49 | (Belgium) René Délaby | 2–4, 7–10 |
| ??? | MBA | ??? | 51; 35 | (France) Guy Bertin | 4–11 |
| ??? | EMC | ??? | 53 | (United Kingdom) Andy Watts | 10 |
| ??? | Yamaha | ??? | ??? | (Switzerland) Roland Freymond | All |
| ??? | Chevallier | ??? | ??? | (France) Jean-Michel Mattioli | All |
| ??? | MBA | ??? | ??? | (Italy) Maurizio Vitali | 2, 12 |
| ??? | Source: | | | | |

Key
Regular Rider
Wildcard Rider
Replacement Rider

=== 500cc riders' standings ===
Scoring system

Points were awarded to the top ten finishers in each race. A rider has to finish the race to earn points. All races counted towards the final standings.

| Position | 1st | 2nd | 3rd | 4th | 5th | 6th | 7th | 8th | 9th | 10th |
| Points | 15 | 12 | 10 | 8 | 6 | 5 | 4 | 3 | 2 | 1 |

| Place | Rider | Team | Machine | RSA (South Africa) | NAT (Italy) | ESP (Spain) | AUT (Austria) | GER (Germany) | FRA (France) | YUG (Socialist Federal Republic of Yugoslavia) | NED (Netherlands) | BEL (Belgium) | GBR (United Kingdom) | SWE (Sweden) | RSM (San Marino) | Points |
|---|---|---|---|---|---|---|---|---|---|---|---|---|---|---|---|---|
| 1 | (United States) Eddie Lawson | Marlboro Yamaha-Agostini | YZR500 | 1 | 2 | 1 | 1 | 2 | 2 | 4 | 3 | 4 | 2 | 1 | 4 | 142 |
| 2 | (United States) Randy Mamola | HRC-Honda | NS500 | | | 2 | 3 | 3 | 3 | 2 | 1 | 2 | 1 | Ret | 1 | 111 |
| 3 | (France) Raymond Roche | Total-Honda | NS500 | 2 | 3 | 3 | 6 | 5 | Ret | 3 | 2 | 3 | Ret | 2 | 2 | 99 |
| 4 | (United States) Freddie Spencer | HRC-Honda | NS500 | DNS | 1 | | 2 | 1 | 1 | 1 | Ret | 1 | | | | 87 |
| 5 | (United Kingdom) Ron Haslam | HRC-Honda | NS500 | Ret | 6 | 4 | 4 | 4 | 4 | 5 | 4 | 5 | 3 | Ret | 3 | 77 |
| 6 | (United Kingdom) Barry Sheene | Heron-Suzuki | RG500 | 3 | Ret | 7 | 10 | 10 | 5 | 7 | Ret | 9 | 5 | Ret | Ret | 34 |
| 7 | (Australia) Wayne Gardner | Honda Britain Racing | NS500 | | 4 | | | | | | 5 | 7 | 6 | 3 | DNS | 33 |
| 8 | (Netherlands) Boet van Dulmen | Toshiba-Suzuki | RG500 | 7 | 7 | 5 | 8 | 9 | Ret | | | Ret | 19 | 7 | 9 | 25 |
| 9 | (Belgium) Didier de Radiguès | Team Elf/Chevallier Johnson | Chevallier NS500 | 4 | 12 | Ret | Ret | Ret | 6 | 6 | Ret | Ret | Ret | Ret | 5 | 24 |
| 10 | (Italy) Virginio Ferrari | Marlboro Yamaha-Agostini | YZR500 | Ret | 8 | DNS | 14 | 7 | 22 | 9 | Ret | Ret | 4 | 6 | Ret | 22 |
| 11 | (United Kingdom) Rob McElnea | Heron-Suzuki | RG500 | | 11 | | 5 | Ret | Ret | | | | 7 | 5 | 6 | 21 |
| 12 | (Switzerland) Sergio Pellandini | HB Gallina-Suzuki | RG500 | 5 | 14 | Ret | 9 | Ret | 9 | 8 | Ret | 8 | Ret | Ret | DNS | 16 |
| 13 | (Japan) Takazumi Katayama | HRC-Honda | NS500 | | | | | | DNS | | 8 | | 8 | 4 | Ret | 14 |
| 14 | (Italy) Franco Uncini | HB Gallina-Suzuki | RG500 | Ret | 5 | Ret | 11 | 6 | DNS | | | | 11 | Ret | 8 | 14 |
| 15 | (Germany) Reinhold Roth | Römer Racing Team | RS500 | 11 | 9 | 8 | 7 | Ret | 8 | 12 | 9 | Ret | 12 | Ret | Ret | 14 |
| 16 | (Japan) Tadahiko Taira | Marlboro Yamaha-Agostini | YZR500 | | | | | | | | 6 | 6 | | | | 10 |
| 17 | (Italy) Massimo Broccoli | | RS500 | 6 | 10 | Ret | 16 | 12 | 7 | Ret | Ret | Ret | 25 | DNQ | 14 | 10 |
| 18 | (Germany) Gustav Reiner | Olymp-Hemden Racing | RS500 | Ret | 13 | 6 | DNS | Ret | | | 7 | 10 | | Ret | Ret | 10 |
| 19 | (United Kingdom) Keith Huewen | David Attwood | RS500 | | 19 | 10 | 13 | 8 | 14 | | 13 | Ret | 13 | 9 | 21 | 6 |
| 20 | (Italy) Leandro Becheroni | | RG500 | | Ret | Ret | Ret | 15 | 21 | Ret | 20 | Ret | Ret | Ret | 7 | 4 |
| 21 | (France) Christian Le Liard | Team Elf/Chevallier Johnson | Chevallier NS500 | 8 | | Ret | Ret | 19 | DNS | | 15 | Ret | 10 | Ret | Ret | 4 |
| 22 | (Switzerland) Wolfgang Von Muralt | Frankonia-Suzuki | RG500 | | Ret | Ret | Ret | Ret | 10 | Ret | 14 | 13 | Ret | 8 | Ret | 4 |
| 23 | (Italy) Fabio Biliotti | | RS500 | | DNQ | 9 | 12 | 14 | 12 | Ret | Ret | 18 | 18 | Ret | 12 | 2 |
| 24 | (United Kingdom) Roger Marshall | Honda Britain Racing | RS500 | | | | | | | | | | 9 | | | 2 |
| 25 | (United Kingdom) Chris Guy | Bill Smith Racing | RS500 | 9 | 24 | 11 | 20 | 22 | | | 23 | | | | | 2 |
| 26 | (Finland) Eero Hyvärinen | | RG500 | | Ret | | | | Ret | | 10 | 17 | | 10 | 13 | 2 |
| 27 | (Italy) Armando Errico | | | | | | | | | | | | | | 10 | 1 |
| 28 | (South Africa) Brett Hudson | | RG500/YZR500 | 10 | | 20 | Ret | 23 | Ret | | 21 | 22 | | | | 1 |
| 29 | (France) Herve Moineau | Cagiva | GP500 | | | | | | Ret | 10 | Ret | Ret | DNS | | Ret | 1 |
| | (United Kingdom) Steve Parrish | Mitsui-Yamaha | YZR500 | | 17 | | | 11 | | | 12 | 16 | 16 | Ret | 20 | 0 |
| | (Zimbabwe) Dave Petersen | | RG500 | | | | | | 11 | 13 | Ret | 14 | | | | 0 |
| | (Italy) Paolo Ferretti | | RG500/NS500 | | DNQ | | 18 | 21 | Ret | 11 | | | 27 | 13 | 16 | 0 |
| | (United Kingdom) Mark Salle | Royal Cars Suzuki | RG500 | | | | | | | | 11 | 19 | 14 | | | 0 |
| | (Italy) Lorenzo Ghiselli | | RG500 | | Ret | | 21 | 16 | 16 | Ret | 19 | 15 | 29 | Ret | 11 | 0 |
| | (Italy) Walter Magliorati | | RG500 | | Ret | Ret | | 20 | Ret | | 18 | 11 | | | | 0 |
| | (United Kingdom) Roger Burnett | Men Only Salon | RG500 | | | | | | | | | | Ret | 11 | | 0 |
| | (Italy) Attilio Riondato | | RG500 | | 21 | 12 | Ret | | 19 | 15 | | DNS | | | | 0 |
| | (France) Frank Gross | | RS500 | | DNQ | Ret | Ret | 18 | Ret | Ret | | 12 | | | | 0 |
| | (Greece) Dimitris Papandreou | | YZR500 | 12 | | | | | DNQ | Ret | | | | | | 0 |
| | (Sweden) Peter Linden | | RS500 | | | | | | | | | | | 12 | | 0 |
| | (Germany) Klaus Klein | Dieter Braun Team | RG500 | 13 | Ret | 14 | 15 | Ret | | | Ret | 20 | Ret | Ret | DNS | 0 |
| | (Netherlands) Rob Punt | Toshiba-Suzuki | RG500 | | 18 | 15 | 17 | 13 | Ret | 19 | Ret | Ret | 23 | Ret | Ret | 0 |
| | (Netherlands) Henk van der Mark | | RS500 | | | | | 17 | 13 | | Ret | Ret | Ret | | | 0 |
| | (Sweden) Peter Skold | | RG500 | | 22 | 13 | Ret | | | | | | | 19 | | 0 |
| | (Austria) Karl Truchsess | | RG500 | | | | Ret | | | 14 | | | | | Ret | 0 |
| | (Sweden) Anders Andersson | | RG500 | | | | | | | | | | | 14 | | 0 |
| | (France) Louis-Luc Maisto | | RS500 | | DNQ | 18 | 22 | Ret | 15 | 16 | | Ret | 26 | Ret | DNQ | 0 |
| | (Switzerland) Marco Gentile | | YZR500 | | | Ret | | | 20 | 17 | | Ret | | Ret | 15 | 0 |
| | (United Kingdom) Gary Lingham | | RG500 | | 15 | | | | | | | | Ret | | 19 | 0 |
| | (United Kingdom) Paul Iddon | David Brown Racing | RG500 | | | | | | | | | | 15 | | | 0 |
| | (Denmark) Kjeld Sorensen | | RG500 | | | | | | | | | | | 15 | | 0 |
| | (Switzerland) Christoph Bürki | Römer Racing Team | RG500 | | | | | | | | | | 28 | 16 | 17 | 0 |
| | (Sweden) Peter Sjostrom | | RG500 | | Ret | 16 | Ret | Ret | Ret | | | | | | | 0 |
| | (Australia) Paul Lewis | | RG500 | | | | | | | | 16 | Ret | Ret | | | 0 |
| | (Italy) Oscar La Ferla | | RG500 | | 16 | | | | | | | | | | | 0 |
| | (Italy) Marco Papa | | RS500 | | 20 | 17 | 19 | 29 | | | | | | | Ret | 0 |
| | (France) Maurice Coq | | | | | | | | 17 | | | | | | | 0 |
| | (Netherlands) Henk de Vries | | RG500 | | | | | 24 | | | 17 | | | | | 0 |
| | (United Kingdom) Mick Grant | Heron-Suzuki | RG500 | | | | | | | | | | 17 | | | 0 |
| | (Finland) Esko Kuparinen | | RG500 | | | | | | | | | | | 17 | | 0 |
| | (France) Claude Arciero | | RS500 | | | Ret | | Ret | 18 | Ret | | | | | | 0 |
| | (Italy) Alessandro Valesi | | RG500 | | Ret | | | | | | | | | | 18 | 0 |
| | (Italy) Fabio Marchesani | | RG500 | | | | | | | 18 | | | | | | 0 |
| | (Finland) Timo Pohjola | | YZR500 | | | | | | | | | | | 18 | | 0 |
| | (Spain) Jose Parra | | RG500 | | | 19 | | | | | | | | | | 0 |
| | (United Kingdom) Trevor Nation | | RG500 | | | | | | | | DNS | | 20 | | | 0 |
| | (Japan) Yashuhiko Gomibuchi | | RG500 | | | | DNQ | | | 20 | | | | | | 0 |
| | (Denmark) Børge Nielsen | | RG500 | | | | | 26 | Ret | 22 | DNQ | 21 | | DNQ | | 0 |
| | (Germany) Georg Jung | | RG500 | | | | | | | 21 | | | | | | 0 |
| | (United Kingdom) Graham Wood | DTR/Fowler’s of Bristol | YZR500 | | | | | | | | | | 21 | | | 0 |
| | (Netherlands) Maarten Duyzers | | RG500 | | | | | | | | 22 | | | | | 0 |
| | (United Kingdom) Simon Buckmaster | | RG500 | | | | | | | | | | 22 | | | 0 |
| | (Germany) Manfred Fischer | | Juchem | | | | 23 | 25 | | | DNQ | | | | | 0 |
| | (United Kingdom) Alan Irwin | | RG500 | | | | | | 23 | | | | 30 | | | 0 |
| | (Italy) Massimo Brutti | | RG500 | | 23 | | | | | | | | | | DNQ | 0 |
| | (Austria) Josef Ragginger | | RG500 | | | | Ret | | | 23 | DNQ | | | | | 0 |
| | (Netherlands) Mile Pajic | | RS500 | | | | | | | | | | 24 | | Ret | 0 |
| | (Austria) Josef Doppler | | RG500 | | | | DNQ | | | 24 | | | | | | 0 |
| | (Italy) Franco Randazzo | | RS500 | | 25 | | | | | | | | | | | 0 |
| | (Czechoslovakia) Bohumil Staša | | RG500 | | | | | | | 25 | | | | | | 0 |
| | (Germany) Hartmut Muller | | RG500 | | | | | 27 | | | | | | | | 0 |
| | (Germany) Wolfgang Schwarz | | RS500 | | | | | 28 | | | | | | | | 0 |
| | (Italy) Marco Lucchinelli | Cagiva | GP500 | Ret | Ret | Ret | Ret | | DNS | | Ret | | | | | 0 |
Sources: † denotes the death of a rider

=== 250cc standings ===
| Place | Rider | Team | Machine | RSA (South Africa) | NAT (Italy) | ESP (Spain) | AUT (Austria) | GER (Germany) | FRA (France) | YUG (Socialist Federal Republic of Yugoslavia) | NED (Netherlands) | BEL (Belgium) | GBR (United Kingdom) | SWE (Sweden) | RSM (San Marino) | Points |
|---|---|---|---|---|---|---|---|---|---|---|---|---|---|---|---|---|
| 1 | (France) Christian Sarron | Sonauto Gauloises-Yamaha | TZ250 | 2 | Ret | 2 | 1 | 1 | 5 | 2 | Ret | 3 | 1 | 2 | Ret | 109 |
| 2 | (Germany) Manfred Herweh | Massa Real Racing Team | Real-Rotax | 4 | 9 | 12 | Ret | 3 | 3 | 1 | 3 | 1 | Ret | 1 | 1 | 100 |
| 3 | (Venezuela) Carlos Lavado | Venemotos-Yamaha | TZ250 | 9 | 15 | 3 | 5 | 5 | 2 | Ret | 1 | Ret | 3 | 7 | 2 | 77 |
| 4 | (Spain) Sito Pons | Kobas | Kobas-Rotax | 3 | Ret | 1 | 3 | Ret | Ret | 5 | 15 | 2 | 6 | 9 | 5 | 66 |
| 5 | (West Germany) Anton Mang | HB-Yamaha | TZ250 | 5 | 10 | 7 | 2 | 4 | 1 | Ret | 4 | 7 | 11 | Ret | 8 | 61 |
| 6 | (Switzerland) Jacques Cornu | Team Parisienne-Elf | TZ250 | 16 | 6 | 6 | 8 | 8 | Ret | 3 | 2 | 13 | 9 | 3 | 3 | 60 |
| 7 | (West Germany) Martin Wimmer | Mitsui-Yamaha | TZ250 | 12 | 2 | 13 | 7 | 2 | 9 | 8 | 23 | 16 | 5 | Ret | 4 | 47 |
| 8 | (United States) Wayne Rainey | Marlboro Roberts-Yamaha | TZ250 | Ret | 3 | 10 | Ret | 6 | 6 | 4 | 12 | Ret | 14 | 13 | Ret | 29 |
| 9 | (United Kingdom) Alan Carter | Marlboro Roberts-Yamaha | TZ250 | 10 | | 4 | 16 | 7 | Ret | 7 | Ret | 23 | Ret | 4 | Ret | 25 |
| 10 | (France) Jean-François Baldé | Pernod-Yamaha | YZR250 | 7 | 20 | 5 | 9 | Ret | 14 | | Ret | 18 | 4 | 6 | Ret | 25 |
| 11 | (France) Guy Bertin | | MBA | | | | 4 | 15 | Ret | Ret | 5 | 5 | Ret | 8 | | 23 |
| 12 | (France) Thierry Espié | Chevallier-Yamaha | Chevallier TZ250 | 15 | Ret | 20 | DNQ | 9 | 4 | Ret | Ret | 6 | Ret | Ret | 6 | 20 |
| 13 | (France) Jean Michel Mattioli | Chevallier-Yamaha | Chevallier TZ250 | 13 | 4 | 9 | 13 | 10 | 10 | 16 | 14 | 8 | 8 | 10 | Ret | 19 |
| 14 | (France) Patrick Fernandez | | TZ250 | 1 | Ret | 24 | Ret | Ret | 17 | 10 | 11 | 19 | 19 | Ret | 15 | 16 |
| 15 | (Venezuela) Ivan Palazzese | Venemotos-Yamaha | TZ250 | 8 | Ret | Ret | | Ret | DNQ | 6 | 20 | 4 | DNS | 16 | 12 | 16 |
| 16 | (Italy) Fausto Ricci | | TZ250 | | 1 | 14 | Ret | Ret | Ret | DNQ | | DNQ | DNQ | | Ret | 15 |
| 17 | (United Kingdom) Andy Watts | EMC | | | | | | | | | 9 | | 2 | 19 | | 14 |
| 18 | (United Kingdom) Donnie McLeod | Dalmac Racing | TZ250 | | 5 | Ret | 17 | Ret | 8 | 15 | Ret | Ret | 15 | 14 | 9 | 11 |
| 19 | (Germany) Harald Eckl | | Rotax | Ret | Ret | | 19 | Ret | 20 | 18 | 13 | 14 | 7 | 5 | Ret | 10 |
| 20 | (France) Jacques Bolle | Pernod-Yamaha | TZ250 | 18 | 7 | 8 | Ret | Ret | Ret | | Ret | 9 | 13 | 11 | Ret | 9 |
| 21 | (Japan) Teruo Fukuda | | TZ250 | | 17 | 11 | 12 | 13 | DNQ | 9 | 6 | Ret | 10 | Ret | Ret | 8 |
| 22 | (Germany) Karl Grässel | | TZ250 | 6 | 13 | Ret | Ret | 25 | 19 | DNQ | 10 | 20 | 17 | Ret | 13 | 6 |
| 23 | (Italy) Loris Reggiani | | KR250 | Ret | | 15 | 6 | 11 | DNQ | Ret | | | DNQ | | 10 | 6 |
| 24 | (Austria) Siegfried Minich | | TZ250 | | | | 10 | 21 | DNQ | Ret | 7 | 15 | 18 | 12 | Ret | 5 |
| 25 | (Italy) Maurizio Vitali | | MBA | | Ret | | | | DNQ | | | | | | 7 | 4 |
| 26 | (Spain) Carlos Cardus | Kobas | Kobas-Rotax | | Ret | Ret | DNS | | 7 | Ret | DNQ | 11 | Ret | Ret | Ret | 4 |
| 27 | (Belgium) Stephane Mertens | Team Hugin-Total | TZ250 | 14 | 16 | 18 | Ret | 22 | DNQ | 11 | 8 | 17 | Ret | 17 | Ret | 3 |
| 28 | (South Africa) Mario Rademeyer | | TZ250 | 11 | 8 | 17 | Ret | 12 | 18 | | DNQ | 21 | DNS | | 11 | 3 |
| 29 | (France) Thierry Rapicault | Sonauto Gauloises-Yamaha | YZR250 | Ret | Ret | | Ret | DNQ | 12 | DNQ | Ret | 10 | 16 | Ret | 17 | 1 |
| | (Belgium) Richard Hubin | Team Hugin-Total | YZR250 | Ret | Ret | 19 | 11 | Ret | Ret | Ret | Ret | Ret | Ret | 21 | 14 | 0 |
| | (France) Jean-Louis Guignabodet | | YZR250 | 17 | 11 | Ret | DNQ | Ret | DNQ | | 21 | DNQ | 24 | 23 | Ret | 0 |
| | (France) Jean-Luc Guillemet | | YZR250 | | | | | | 11 | | | | | | | 0 |
| | (Germany) Herbert Besendorfer | | YZR250 | | | | 18 | | 21 | Ret | | | 12 | 15 | | 0 |
| | (Italy) Massimo Matteoni | | YZR250 | | Ret | 21 | DNQ | 16 | DNQ | 12 | | | | | 19 | 0 |
| | (Italy) Davide Tardozzi | | YZR250 | | 12 | | | 17 | DNQ | | | | | | Ret | 0 |
| | (Austria) August Auinger | | Monnet | | | | | | 22 | Ret | Ret | 12 | Ret | Ret | | 0 |
| | (United Kingdom) Neil Robinson | | MBA | | | 22 | | | DNQ | 13 | | 22 | DNQ | | | 0 |
| | (France) Jacques Bolle | Pernod-Yamaha | YZR250 | | | | | | 13 | | | | | | | 0 |
| | (Spain) Juan Garriga | | YZR250 | | | 25 | | | DNQ | 14 | | | | | | 0 |
| | (France) Herve Guilleux | Chevallier-Yamaha | Chevallier YZR250 | Ret | Ret | Ret | Ret | 14 | DNQ | DNQ | | | DNQ | DNQ | | 0 |
| | (Austria) Thomas Bacher | | YZR250 | | | | 14 | | | Ret | | | | | | 0 |
| | (Italy) Ivan-Carlo Villini | | MBA | | 14 | | | | | | | | | | | 0 |
| | (Austria) Erich Klein | | Rotax | | | | 15 | | | 17 | | | | | DNQ | 0 |
| | (Switzerland) Roland Freymond | Team Parisienne-Elf | YZR250 | Ret | Ret | Ret | Ret | Ret | 15 | Ret | Ret | Ret | Ret | Ret | Ret | 0 |
| | (France) Gabriel Grabia | | YZR250 | | | 16 | | Ret | Ret | Ret | | | DNS | DNQ | DNQ | 0 |
| | (United Kingdom) Tony Head | | Rotax | | | | | Ret | | | 16 | DNQ | DNS | | | 0 |
| | (Switzerland) Edwin Weibel | | YZR250 | | | | | | | | DNQ | | | | 16 | 0 |
| | (France) Antoine Longo | | Ducombs | | | | | | 16 | | | | | | | 0 |
| | (Netherlands) Cees Doorakkers | | YZR250 | | | | | | | | 17 | | | | | 0 |
| | (Austria) Manfred Obinger | Römer Racing Team | YZR250 | | | | 20 | 18 | DNQ | DNQ | | | 27 | 18 | Ret | 0 |
| | (Belgium) Rene Delaby | | YZR250 | | 21 | Ret | Ret | DNQ | DNQ | 19 | Ret | 24 | 21 | DNQ | 18 | 0 |
| | (Italy) Marcellino Lucchi | | Rotax | | 18 | | | | | Ret | | | | | Ret | 0 |
| | (Netherlands) Peter Looijesteijn | | Rotax | | | | | | | | 18 | Ret | | | | 0 |
| | (Sweden) Eilert Lundstedt | | YZR250 | | 19 | | DNQ | 19 | DNQ | | | | | 24 | Ret | 0 |
| | (United Kingdom) Tony Rogers | Armstrong-Rotax | CF250 | | | | | | | | 19 | Ret | | | | 0 |
| | (South Africa) Jimmy Rodger | | YZR250 | 19 | | | | | | | | | | | | 0 |
| | (Switzerland) Bruno Lüscher | | YZR250 | DNQ | | | DNQ | 20 | DNQ | DNQ | DNQ | Ret | 23 | 22 | 20 | 0 |
| | (Austria) Josef Hutter | Bartol-Yamaha | YZR250 | | | | Ret | | | 20 | | | | | | 0 |
| | (South Africa) Dave Emond | | YZR250 | 20 | | | | | | | | | | | | 0 |
| | (United Kingdom) Paul Tinkler | | YZR250 | | | | | | | | | | 20 | | | 0 |
| | (Denmark) Anders Skov | | YZR250 | | | | | | | | | | | 20 | | 0 |
| | (South Africa) Klaus-Peter Baller | | YZR250 | 21 | | | | | | | | | | | | 0 |
| | (Netherlands) Mar Schouten | | YZR250 | | | | | 23 | | Ret | 22 | Ret | DNQ | | | 0 |
| | (South Africa) Danny Bristol | | YZR250 | 22 | | | | | | | | | | | | 0 |
| | (Australia) Graeme McGregor | EMC | | | | | | | | | | | 22 | | | 0 |
| | (Spain) Luis Miguel Reyes | Kobas | Kobas-Rotax | | | 23 | DNQ | DNS | DNQ | Ret | | | DNQ | | | 0 |
| | (France) Jacky Onda | | YZR250 | | | | | | 23 | | | | | | DNQ | 0 |
| | (United Kingdom) Chas Mortimer | Armstrong-Rotax | CF250 | 23 | | | | | | | | | | | | 0 |
| | (South Africa) Barry Kerr | | YZR250 | 24 | | | | | | | | | | | | 0 |
| | (Germany) Martin Füg | | Rotax | | | | | 24 | | | | | | | | 0 |
| | (France) Philippe Pagano | | YZR250 | | | | | | 24 | | | | | | | 0 |
| | (Belgium) Michel Simeon | Shell | RS250 | | | | | Ret | | | Ret | 25 | DNQ | | | 0 |
| | (United Kingdom) Graham Young | | Rotax | | | | | Ret | | | | | 25 | | | 0 |
| | (Switzerland) Patrick Schmalz | | YZR250 | | | | | | 25 | | | | | | | 0 |
| | (Sweden) Per-Olof Ogeborn | | Kentaco | | | | | | | | | | | 25 | | 0 |
| | (Chile) Vincenzo Cascino | | YZR250 | DNQ | | | | 26 | | | | | DNQ | DNQ | DNQ | 0 |
| | (United Kingdom) Gary Noel | EMC | | | | | | | | | | | 26 | | | 0 |
| | (United States) David Floyd Busby | | Rotax | | | Ret | DNQ | 27 | | | | | | | | 0 |
| | (United Kingdom) Niall Mackenzie | Armstrong-Rotax | CF250 | | | | | | | | | | 28 | Ret | | 0 |
| | (Germany) Hans Becker | | YZR250 | | | | Ret | Ret | | | Ret | | | | | 0 |
| | (Spain) Angel Nieto | Kobas | Kobas-Rotax | | Ret | Ret | | | | | | | DNQ | | | 0 |
| | (United Kingdom) Donnie Robinson | | YZR250 | | | | | Ret | DNQ | DNQ | DNQ | DNQ | DNQ | | DNQ | 0 |
| | (Austria) Stefan Klabacher | | Rotax | | | | Ret | DNQ | | DNQ | | | | | | 0 |
| | (Italy) Marino Neri | | YZR250 | | Ret | | | | DNQ | | | | | | DNQ | 0 |
| | (Sweden) Bengt Elgh | | MBA | | | | | | | DNQ | | | | Ret | DNQ | 0 |
| | (Spain) Antonio Garcia | Kobas | Kobas-Rotax | | | Ret | | | DNQ | | | | | | | 0 |
| | (Germany) Michael Lederer | | YZR250 | | | | Ret | DNQ | | | | | | | | 0 |
| | (South Africa) Kevin Hellyer | | YZR250 | Ret | | | | | | | | | | | | 0 |
| | (South Africa) Warren Bristol | | YZR250 | Ret | | | | | | | | | | | | 0 |
| | (South Africa) Leonard Dibon | | YZR250 | Ret | | | | | | | | | | | | 0 |
| | (United Kingdom) Russell Wood | | YZR250 | Ret | | | | | | | | | | | | 0 |
| | (South Africa) Ronan Schulz | | YZR250 | Ret | | | | | | | | | | | | 0 |
| | (South Africa) Dave Estment | | Honda | Ret | | | | | | | | | | | | 0 |
| | (Germany) Bodo Schmidt | | Honda | | | | | Ret | | | | | | | | 0 |
| | (France) Michel Galbit | | YZR250 | | | | | | Ret | | | | | | | 0 |
| | (France) Jean Foray | | YZR250 | | | | | | Ret | | | | | | | 0 |
| | (Belgium) Eric De Doncker | | YZR250 | | | | | | | | | Ret | | | | 0 |
| | (Germany) Herbert Hauf | | Honda | | | | | DNS | | | | | | | | 0 |
| | (Japan) Kiyotaka Sakai | | YZR250 | | | | | DNS | | | | | | | | 0 |
| | (United Kingdom) Peter Hubbard | | Rotax | | | | | | | | | | DNS | | | 0 |
| | (Austria) August Weissner | | YZR250 | | | | DNQ | | | DNQ | | | | | | 0 |
| | (Austria) Karl-Heinz Riegl | | Moam | | | | DNQ | | | DNQ | | | | | | 0 |
| | (Austria) Englebert Neumair | Bartol-Yamaha | YZR250 | | | | DNQ | | | DNQ | | | | | | 0 |
| | (South Africa) Donald Shaw | | Rotax | DNQ | | | | | | | | | | | | 0 |
| | (South Africa) Alan Stroud | | YZR250 | DNQ | | | | | | | | | | | | 0 |
| | (Germany) Frank Wagner | | Honda | | | | | DNQ | | | | | | | | 0 |
| | (France) Philippe Robles | | YZR250 | | | | | | DNQ | | | | | | | 0 |
| | (France) Michel Augizeau | | YZR250 | | | | | | DNQ | | | | | | | 0 |
| | (Switzerland) Daniel Baertschie | | YZR250 | | | | | | | DNQ | | | | | | 0 |
| | (Austria) Foco Tibor | Chevallier-Yamaha | Chevallier YZR250 | | | | | | | DNQ | | | | | | 0 |
| | (Socialist Federal Republic of Yugoslavia) Silvo Habat | | YZR250 | | | | | | | DNQ | | | | | | 0 |
| | (Socialist Federal Republic of Yugoslavia) Mita Erjavec | | YZR250 | | | | | | | DNQ | | | | | | 0 |
| | (Switzerland) Rudi Gaechter | | YZR250 | | | | | | | DNQ | | | | | | 0 |
| | (Socialist Federal Republic of Yugoslavia) Bozo Janezic | Armstrong-Rotax | CF250 | | | | | | | DNQ | | | | | | 0 |
| | (Austria) Gunther Fluch | | YZR250 | | | | | | | DNQ | | | | | | 0 |
| | (Socialist Federal Republic of Yugoslavia) Zdravko Ljeljak | | YZR250 | | | | | | | DNQ | | | | | | 0 |
| | (Socialist Federal Republic of Yugoslavia) Marijan Kosić | | YZR250 | | | | | | | DNQ | | | | | | 0 |
| | (Japan) Satoshi Endo | | YZR250 | | | | | | | DNQ | | | | | | 0 |
| | (Austria) Walter Flatscher | Bartol-Yamaha | YZR250 | | | | | | | DNQ | | | | | | 0 |
| | (Socialist Federal Republic of Yugoslavia) Radovan Stanojević | | YZR250 | | | | | | | DNQ | | | | | | 0 |
| | (Austria) Johann Gassner | | YZR250 | | | | | | | DNQ | | | | | | 0 |
| | (Netherlands) Gerard van der Wal | | YZR250 | | | | | | | | DNQ | | | | | 0 |
| | (Belgium) Jean-Marc Toffolo | | YZR250 | | | | | | | | | DNQ | | | | 0 |
| | (Belgium) Lucio Pietroniro | | YZR250 | | | | | | | | | DNQ | | | | 0 |
| | (Belgium) Bernard Denis | | YZR250 | | | | | | | | | DNQ | | | | 0 |
| | (United Kingdom) Keith Huewen | | YZR250 | | | | | | | | | DNQ | | | | 0 |
| | (Republic of Ireland) Joey Dunlop | | Honda | | | | | | | | | | DNQ | | | 0 |
| | (United Kingdom) Steve Williams | | YZR250 | | | | | | | | | | DNQ | | | 0 |
| | (Sweden) Per Jansson | | YZR250 | | | | | | | | | | | DNQ | | 0 |
| | (Sweden) Micke Melander | | YZR250 | | | | | | | | | | | DNQ | | 0 |
| | (Finland) Jarmo Liitia | | Rotax | | | | | | | | | | | DNQ | | 0 |
| | (Denmark) Svend Andersson | Armstrong-Rotax | CF250 | | | | | | | | | | | DNQ | | 0 |

=== 125cc standings ===
| Place | Rider | Machine | NAT (Italy) | ESP (Spain) | GER (Germany) | FRA (France) | NED (Netherlands) | GBR (United Kingdom) | SWE (Sweden) | RSM (San Marino) | Points |
|---|---|---|---|---|---|---|---|---|---|---|---|
| 1 | (Spain) Angel Nieto | Garelli | 1 | 1 | 1 | 1 | 1 | 1 | | Ret | 90 |
| 2 | (Italy) Eugenio Lazzarini | Garelli | 3 | 2 | 3 | 2 | 2 | Ret | 3 | 2 | 78 |
| 3 | (Italy) Fausto Gresini | MBA | Ret | Ret | 4 | 4 | Ret | 3 | 1 | 3 | 51 |
| 4 | (Italy) Maurizio Vitali | MBA | 2 | Ret | Ret | 7 | Ret | 5 | 4 | 1 | 45 |
| 5 | (Austria) August Auinger | MBA | Ret | Ret | 5 | 3 | 6 | Ret | 2 | 4 | 41 |
| 6 | (France) Jean-Claude Selini | MBA | 8 | Ret | 6 | Ret | 4 | 2 | Ret | Ret | 33 |
| 7 | (Italy) Stefano Caracchi | MBA | 4 | 4 | 12 | Ret | 5 | 8 | 7 | Ret | 29 |
| 8 | (Italy) Luca Cadalora | MBA | 5 | 5 | 2 | 12 | Ret | 6 | Ret | 7 | 27 |
| 9 | (Switzerland) Hans Müller | MBA | 9 | 3 | Ret | 6 | 3 | Ret | | Ret | 27 |
| 10 | (Switzerland) Bruno Kneubühler | MBA | 6 | 9 | 9 | 5 | 7 | 4 | Ret | Ret | 27 |
| 11 | (Finland) Johnny Wickstroem | MBA | 7 | 16 | 8 | 8 | Ret | 9 | 5 | 9 | 20 |
| 12 | (Italy) Giuseppe Ascareggi | MBA | 14 | 7 | 7 | Ret | | 20 | Ret | 17 | 8 |
| 13 | (Belgium) Olivier Liégeois | MBA | Ret | Ret | 11 | Ret | 15 | 7 | 10 | 8 | 8 |
| 14 | (Italy) Ezio Gianola | MBA | Ret | 10 | Ret | 11 | Ret | 12 | Ret | 5 | 7 |
| 15 | (Spain) Manuel Herreros | MBA | | 6 | | | | | | | 6 |
| 16 | (Belgium) Lucio Pietroniro | MBA | 17 | Ret | 10 | 9 | Ret | Ret | 9 | 10 | 6 |
| 17 | (United Kingdom) Alex Bedford | MBA | | | | | | Ret | 6 | | 5 |
| 18 | (Italy) Domenico Brigaglia | MBA | 11 | 14 | Ret | | | 13 | 13 | 6 | 5 |
| 19 | (Netherlands) Henk Van Kessel | MBA | Ret | 13 | Ret | 10 | 8 | Ret | Ret | Ret | 4 |
| 20 | (Germany) Hubert Abold | MBA | 20 | 8 | Ret | | 23 | | | Ret | 3 |
| 21 | (Sweden) Hakan Olsson | Starol | | | | | Ret | | 8 | 15 | 3 |
| 22 | (United Kingdom) Neil Robinson | MBA | Ret | Ret | Ret | DNQ | 9 | Ret | | 14 | 2 |
| 23 | (Germany) Gerhard Waibel | MBA | 10 | Ret | 13 | | 13 | | | Ret | 1 |
| 24 | (Netherlands) Anton Straver | MBA | 15 | | | | 10 | 11 | 11 | 11 | 1 |
| 25 | (France) Jacky Hutteau | MBA | | | Ret | 18 | 21 | 10 | 12 | 12 | 1 |
| | (Algeria) Bady Hassaine | MBA | Ret | 11 | Ret | Ret | | | | | 0 |
| | (Netherlands) Ton Spek | MBA | DNQ | | | | 11 | | 15 | | 0 |
| | (Argentina) Willy Perez | MBA | 12 | 12 | Ret | 14 | 14 | Ret | Ret | 13 | 0 |
| | (Germany) Alfred Waibel | Waibel | | | | Ret | 12 | | | | 0 |
| | (Finland) Jussi Hautaniemi | MBA | 13 | | | | 16 | | Ret | 23 | 0 |
| | (Italy) Pierluigi Aldrovandi | MBA | | | | 13 | | | | | 0 |
| | (Germany) Willi Hupperich | MBA | 19 | 15 | Ret | Ret | Ret | 15 | 14 | 16 | 0 |
| | (Germany) Helmut Lichtenburg | MBA | 16 | | 14 | 16 | 18 | 18 | 18 | DNS | 0 |
| | (Austria) Mike Leitner | MBA | | | Ret | Ret | DNQ | 14 | | 24 | 0 |
| | (Netherlands) Boy van Erp | MBA | | | 15 | | Ret | | 17 | | 0 |
| | (France) Michel Escudier | MBA | | | | 15 | | | | | 0 |
| | (Socialist Federal Republic of Yugoslavia) Alois Pavlic | MBA | | | 16 | | 22 | 16 | | 26 | 0 |
| | (Denmark) Mickel Nielsen | MBA | | | | | | | 16 | | 0 |
| | (Czechoslovakia) Peter Baláž | MBA | 21 | 17 | 20 | 21 | 17 | Ret | | | 0 |
| | (Switzerland) Peter Somer | MBA | | | 17 | 19 | Ret | 22 | 23 | 18 | 0 |
| | (United Kingdom) Tony Smith | MBA | | 18 | Ret | | 20 | 17 | | | 0 |
| | (France) Paul Bordes | MBA | | | | 17 | | | | | 0 |
| | (Denmark) Henrik Rasmussen | MBA | 18 | | | 22 | | | Ret | | 0 |
| | (Socialist Federal Republic of Yugoslavia) Robert Hmeljak | MBA | | | 18 | | | 24 | | DNQ | 0 |
| | (Denmark) Thomas Moller-Pedersen | MBA | | | Ret | 24 | DNQ | 19 | 20 | DNS | 0 |
| | (Switzerland) Jacques Grandjean | MBA | | | | 20 | | Ret | | 19 | 0 |
| | (Spain) Antonio Gasion | MBA | | 19 | | | | | | | 0 |
| | (Germany) Dirk Hafeneger | MBA | | | 19 | | | | | | 0 |
| | (Netherlands) Jan Eggens | EGA | | | | | 19 | | | | 0 |
| | (Denmark) Flemming Sorensen | MBA | | | | | | | 19 | | 0 |
| | (Austria) Erich Klein | MBA | Ret | | | Ret | Ret | | | 20 | 0 |
| | (Spain) Ramon Pano | MBA | | 20 | | | | | | | 0 |
| | (Germany) Horst Elsenheimer | MBA | | | 21 | | | | | | 0 |
| | (United Kingdom) Ian McConnachie | Arfryn | | | | | | 21 | | | 0 |
| | (Sweden) Lars-Erik Kallesoe | Laserelli | | | | | | | 21 | | 0 |
| | (Socialist Federal Republic of Yugoslavia) Janos Pintar | MBA | | | | | | | | 21 | 0 |
| | (Finland) Jikka Jaakkola | MBA | Ret | | DNS | | DNQ | | 22 | | 0 |
| | (Austria) Karl Dauer | MBA | 22 | | DNS | | DNQ | | | | 0 |
| | (Spain) Andreas Sanches-Marin | MBA | | Ret | | | | | | 22 | 0 |
| | (Switzerland) Beat Sidler | MBA | | | Ret | 23 | | Ret | | 25 | 0 |
| | (United Kingdom) Doug Flather | MBA | | | | | | 23 | | | 0 |
| | (Sweden) Jorgen Ask | MBA | | | | | | | 24 | DNQ | 0 |
| | (United Kingdom) Steve Mason | MBA | | | | | | 25 | | | 0 |
| | (Italy) Fabio Meozzi | MBA | Ret | | | Ret | | | | Ret | 0 |
| | (Italy) Massimo de Lorenzi | LGM | Ret | | | DNS | | | | DNQ | 0 |
| | (Belgium) Chris Baert | MBA | | | Ret | | DNQ | | | | 0 |
| | (United Kingdom) Tony Head | MBA | | | Ret | | DNQ | | | | 0 |
| | (Italy) Pier Paolo Bianchi | MBA | Ret | | | | | | | | 0 |
| | (Italy) Paolo Casoli | MBA | Ret | | | | | | | | 0 |
| | (Italy) Massimo Farceri | Sanvenero | Ret | | | | | | | | 0 |
| | (Spain) Miguel Cortes | Sanvenero | | Ret | | | | | | | 0 |
| | (Italy) Paolo Gamberini | MBA | | Ret | | | | | | | 0 |
| | (Spain) F. Davo | MBA | | Ret | | | | | | | 0 |
| | (Spain) Manuel Hernandez | MBA | | Ret | | | | | | | 0 |
| | (Chile) Pablo Gamberini | MBA | | | Ret | | | | | | 0 |
| | (Germany) Stefan Schmitt | MBA | | | Ret | | | | | | 0 |
| | (Germany) Thomas Weickardt | MBA | | | Ret | | | | | | 0 |
| | (Switzerland) Joe Genoud | MBA | | | Ret | | | | | | 0 |
| | (Germany) Wilhelm Lucke | MBA | | | Ret | | | | | | 0 |
| | (Finland) Esa Kytola | MBA | | | | Ret | | | | | 0 |
| | (Netherlands) Willem Heykoop | Sanvenero | | | | | Ret | | | | 0 |
| | (Netherlands) Martin van Soest | MBA | | | | | Ret | | | | 0 |
| | (United Kingdom) Robin Appleyard | MBA | | | | | | Ret | | | 0 |
| | (Finland) Juha Pakkanen | MBA | | | | | | | Ret | | 0 |
| | (Finland) Hannu Kallio | MBA | | | | | | | Ret | | 0 |
| | (Denmark) Flemming Kistrup | MBA | | | | | | | Ret | | 0 |
| | (Sweden) Rune Zalle | MBA | | | | | | | Ret | | 0 |
| | (Italy) Pierfrancesco Chili | MBA | | | | | | | | Ret | 0 |
| | (France) Alain Guillaud | MBA | | | | DNQ | | | | | 0 |
| | (United Kingdom) David Fabian | MBA | | | | | | DNQ | | | 0 |
| | (Austria) Hans Hummel | Hummel | | | | | | DNQ | | | 0 |

=== 80cc standings ===
| Place | Rider | Machine | NAT (Italy) | ESP (Spain) | AUT (Austria) | GER (Germany) | YUG (Socialist Federal Republic of Yugoslavia) | NED (Netherlands) | BEL (Belgium) | RSM (San Marino) | Points |
|---|---|---|---|---|---|---|---|---|---|---|---|
| 1 | (Switzerland) Stefan Dörflinger | Zündapp | 2 | 7 | 1 | 1 | 1 | Ret | 1 | 5 | 82 |
| 2 | (West Germany) Hubert Abold | Zündapp | 3 | 4 | 2 | 4 | 2 | 3 | 6 | 3 | 75 |
| 3 | (Italy) Pier Paolo Bianchi | Huvo-Casal | 1 | 1 | 4 | 2 | Ret | 6 | 4 | 6 | 68 |
| 4 | (Spain) Jorge Martínez | Derbi | 7 | 8 | 5 | Ret | 3 | 1 | 2 | 2 | 62 |
| 5 | (West Germany) Gerhard Waibel | Real | 5 | Ret | 3 | 3 | 4 | 4 | 7 | 1 | 61 |
| 6 | (Netherlands) Hans Spaan | Casal | 4 | 5 | 6 | Ret | 5 | 2 | 3 | Ret | 47 |
| 7 | (Netherlands) Willem Heykoop | Huvo-Casal | 6 | | 7 | 5 | Ret | 5 | 5 | 9 | 29 |
| 8 | (Switzerland) Hans Müller | Sachs | Ret | 3 | 8 | Ret | | 8 | 9 | Ret | 18 |
| 9 | (Netherlands) George Looijesteyn | Casal | 12 | 9 | Ret | 6 | 6 | 7 | Ret | Ret | 16 |
| 10 | (Netherlands) Theo Timmer | Casal | 11 | Ret | Ret | Ret | 9 | 9 | 10 | 4 | 13 |
| 11 | (Netherlands) Henk Van Kessel | Huvo-Casal | | 2 | | | | | | | 12 |
| 12 | (Socialist Federal Republic of Yugoslavia) Zdravko Matulja | Tomos | 19 | | 9 | 8 | 7 | 11 | 11 | Ret | 9 |
| 13 | (Belgium) Serge Julin | Casal | | | | 7 | Ret | 20 | 8 | Ret | 7 |
| 14 | (Netherlands) Paul Rimmelzwaan | Harmsen | Ret | | | 13 | 8 | 10 | Ret | 8 | 7 |
| 15 | (Germany) Rainer Scheidhauer | Seel | Ret | 6 | Ret | Ret | | | | | 5 |
| 16 | (Germany) Reinhard Koberstein | Seel | 9 | 10 | Ret | 9 | Ret | DNS | | Ret | 5 |
| 17 | (Austria) Gerd Kafka | Sachs | | | | | | | | 7 | 4 |
| 18 | (Italy) Maurizio Stocco | Lusuardi | 8 | | Ret | | | | | Ret | 3 |
| 19 | (Austria) Otto Machinek | Kreidler | 13 | | 14 | 12 | 10 | Ret | 14 | 10 | 2 |
| 20 | (Italy) Claudio Granata | Garelli | 10 | | | | 11 | | | | 1 |
| 21 | (Germany) Thomas Engl | Sachs | Ret | | 10 | 18 | Ret | Ret | | Ret | 1 |
| 22 | (Germany) Bernd Rossbach | Casal | | | 12 | 10 | Ret | 14 | 18 | 13 | 1 |
| | (Germany) Johann Auer | Eberhardt | | | 11 | 16 | Ret | 18 | 16 | 11 | 0 |
| | (Netherlands) Bertus Grinwis | Casal | | | Ret | 11 | | 13 | 12 | | 0 |
| | (United Kingdom) Tony Smith | Casal | 23 | 11 | Ret | 14 | | | | | 0 |
| | (Netherlands) Hans Koopman | Kreidler | 15 | | 19 | Ret | 12 | 12 | 15 | Ret | 0 |
| | (Belgium) Chris Baert | Eberhardt | 14 | 12 | 13 | 15 | 15 | 19 | 17 | 20 | 0 |
| | (Italy) Salvatore Milano | Casal | 17 | | | | 13 | | | 12 | 0 |
| | (Netherlands) Jos van Dongen | Sachs | 20 | | 15 | 19 | 16 | 16 | 13 | 19 | 0 |
| | (Italy) Giuliano Tabanelli | BBFT | Ret | | | | 14 | | | 18 | 0 |
| | (United Kingdom) Ian McConnachie | Casal | | | | | | | | 14 | 0 |
| | (Italy) Bruno Casanova | Casal | Ret | | | | | | | 15 | 0 |
| | (Netherlands) Aad Wijsman | Harmsen | | | | | | 15 | | | 0 |
| | (Germany) Inge Arends | Jas | | | 16 | Ret | | 25 | | | 0 |
| | (Germany) Rainer Kunz | FKN | Ret | | Ret | | Ret | Ret | Ret | 16 | 0 |
| | (Spain) Joaquin Gali | Kreidler | 16 | Ret | | | | | | | 0 |
| | (Netherlands) Bert Smit | BZ | | | | 17 | | 17 | | | 0 |
| | (Germany) Gunter Schirnhofer | Honda | | | 17 | Ret | 18 | 23 | 19 | 22 | 0 |
| | (Socialist Federal Republic of Yugoslavia) Miljenko Nervo | Sever | | | | | 17 | | | | 0 |
| | (Italy) Massimo Fargeri | Casal | | | | | | | | 17 | 0 |
| | (Italy) Pasquale Buonfante | Kreidler | 18 | | | | 19 | | | Ret | 0 |
| | (Finland) Mika-Sakari Komu | Eberhardt | | | 18 | Ret | | 24 | | | 0 |
| | (Socialist Federal Republic of Yugoslavia) Lajos Horti | Kreidler | | | | | 20 | | | | 0 |
| | (Belgium) Georges Fisette | Casal | | | | | | | 20 | | 0 |
| | (Netherlands) Eico Rispens | Rispens | | | | Ret | | 21 | | | 0 |
| | (Italy) Simone Crespi | Minarelli | 21 | | | | | | | | 0 |
| | (United Kingdom) Steve Mason | MBA | | | | | | | | 21 | 0 |
| | (Switzerland) Reiner Koster | Casal | 24 | | Ret | Ret | Ret | 22 | Ret | 23 | 0 |
| | (Italy) Nicola Casadei | Casal | 22 | | | | | | | Ret | 0 |
| | (Germany) Gerhard Bauer | Ziegler | | Ret | Ret | Ret | | Ret | | | 0 |
| | (Austria) Hans Hummel | Hummel | | | Ret | Ret | | Ret | | Ret | 0 |
| | (Germany) Stefan Kurfiss | Kreidler | Ret | | Ret | | | | | | 0 |
| | (Germany) Kasimir Rapczynski | Kreidler | | | | Ret | Ret | | | | 0 |
| | (Italy) Ezio Saffiotti | UFO | Ret | | | | | | | DNQ | 0 |
| | (Italy) Paolo Priori | Lusuardi | Ret | | | | | | | DNQ | 0 |
| | (Spain) Ricardo Tormo | Derbi | Ret | | | | | | | | 0 |
| | (Spain) Ramon Gali | Bultaco | | Ret | | | | | | | 0 |
| | (Spain) Manuel Herreros | Huvo-Casal | | Ret | | | | | | | 0 |
| | (Portugal) Henrique Sande | Carmona | | Ret | | | | | | | 0 |
| | (Spain) Daniel Mateos | Autisa | | Ret | | | | | | | 0 |
| | (Spain) Jorge Jimenez | Huvo-Casal | | Ret | | | | | | | 0 |
| | (Spain) Pablo Cegarra | Huvo-Casal | | Ret | | | | | | | 0 |
| | (Austria) Erich Reuberger | Suzuki | | | Ret | | | | | | 0 |
| | (Italy) Mauro Mordenti | Kreidler | | | | | Ret | | | | 0 |
| | (Socialist Federal Republic of Yugoslavia) Robert Hmeljak | MBA | | | | | Ret | | | | 0 |
| | (Belgium) Hans Stevens | Casal | | | | | | | Ret | | 0 |
| | (Italy) Massimo de Lorenzi | RB | | | | | | | | Ret | 0 |
| | (United Kingdom) Edward Rees | Kreidler | | | | | | | | DNQ | 0 |
