= 1984 Yugoslavian motorcycle Grand Prix =

(Socialist Federal Republic of Yugoslavia) 1984 Yugoslavian Grand Prix
Race details
- Race 7 of 12 races in the 1984 Grand Prix motorcycle racing season
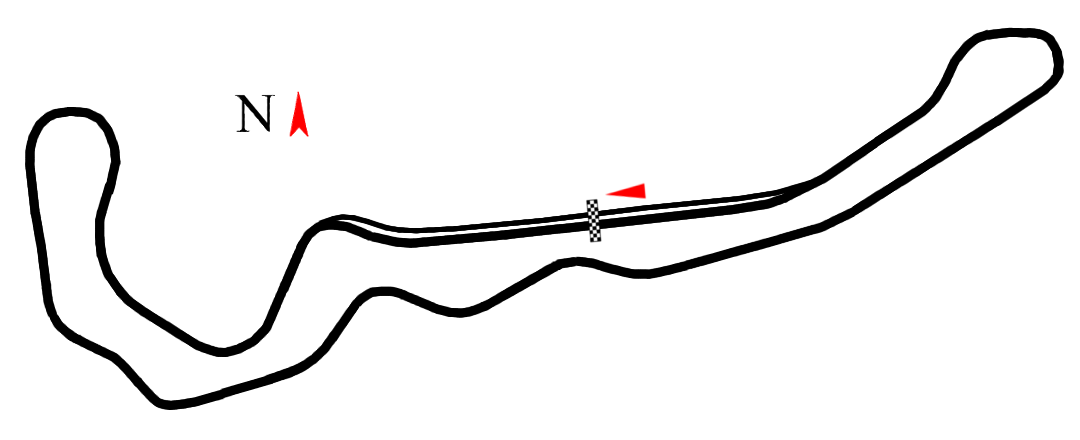
- Date: 17 June 1984
- Official name: Yu Grand Prix
- Location: Automotodrom Rijeka
- Course: Permanent racing facility; 4.168 km (2.590 mi)

500cc
Pole position
- Rider: (United States) Freddie Spencer
- Time: 1:31.700
Fastest lap
- Rider: (United States) Freddie Spencer
- Time: 1:32.330
Podium
- First: (United States) Freddie Spencer
- Second: (United States) Randy Mamola
- Third: (France) Raymond Roche

250cc
Pole position
- Rider: (United States) Wayne Rainey
- Time: 1:35.860
Fastest lap
- Rider: (Venezuela) Carlos Lavado
- Time: 1:36.120
Podium
- First: (West Germany) Manfred Herweh
- Second: (France) Christian Sarron
- Third: (Switzerland) Jacques Cornu

125cc
Pole position
- Rider: No 125cc race was held
Fastest lap
- Rider: No 125cc race was held
Podium
- First: No 125cc race was held
- Second: No 125cc race was held
- Third: No 125cc race was held

80cc
Pole position
- Rider: (Switzerland) Stefan Dörflinger
Fastest lap
- Rider: (Switzerland) Stefan Dörflinger
Podium
- First: (Switzerland) Stefan Dörflinger
- Second: (West Germany) Hubert Abold
- Third: (Spain) Jorge Martínez

The 1984 Yugoslavian motorcycle Grand Prix was the seventh round of the 1984 Grand Prix motorcycle racing season. It took place on the weekend of 15–17 June 1984 at the Automotodrom Rijeka.

== Classification ==
=== 500 cc ===
Pos.	Rider	Team	Manufacturer	Time/Retired	Points
1	(United States) Freddie Spencer	Honda Racing Corporation	Honda	50'00.620	15
2	(United States) Randy Mamola	RM Promotions	Honda	+17.580	12
3	(France) Raymond Roche	Honda Total	Honda	+24.660	10
4	(United States) Eddie Lawson	Marlboro Team Agostini	Yamaha	+27.300	8
5	(United Kingdom) Ron Haslam	Honda Racing Corporation	Honda	+41.540	6
6	(Belgium) Didier de Radiguès	Team Elf Chevallier Johnson	Honda	+1'09.410	5
7	(United Kingdom) Barry Sheene	Heron Team Suzuki	Suzuki	+1'17.860	4
8	(Switzerland) Sergio Pellandini	HB Suzuki GP Team	Suzuki	+1'18.110	3
9	(Italy) Virginio Ferrari	Marlboro Team Agostini	Yamaha	+1 lap	2
10	(France) Hervé Moineau	Cagiva Motor Italia	Cagiva	+1 lap	1
11	(Italy) Paolo Ferretti		Suzuki	+1 lap	
12	(West Germany) Reinhold Roth	Romer Racing Suisse	Honda	+1 lap	
13	(Zimbabwe) Dave Petersen		Suzuki	+1 lap	
14	(Austria) Karl Truchsess		Suzuki	+1 lap	
15	(Italy) Attilio Riondato	Heron Team Suzuki	Suzuki	+1 lap	
16	(France) Louis-Luc Maisto		Honda	+1 lap	
17	(Switzerland) Marco Gentile		Yamaha	+2 laps	
18	(Italy) Fabio Marchesani		Suzuki	+2 laps	
19	(Netherlands) Rob Punt		Suzuki	+2 laps	
20	(Japan) Yashuhiko Gomibuchi		Suzuki	+2 laps	
21	(West Germany) Georg Jung	Suzuki	+2 laps		
22	(Denmark) Börge Nielsen		Suzuki	+2 laps	
23	(Austria) Josef Ragginger		Suzuki	+2 laps	
24	(Austria) Josef Doppler		Suzuki	+3 laps	
25	(Czechoslovakia) Bohumil Staša		Suzuki	+4 laps	
Ret	(Italy) Lorenzo Ghiselli		Suzuki	Retired	
Ret	(Italy) Claude Arciero		Honda	Retired	
Ret	(Greece) Dimitrios Papandreou		Yamaha	Retired	
Ret	(France) Franck Gross		Honda	Retired	
Ret	(Italy) Fabio Biliotti		Honda	Retired	
Ret	(Italy) Leandro Beccheroni		Suzuki	Retired	
Ret	(Italy) Massimo Broccoli		Honda	Accident	
Ret	(Switzerland) Wolfgang von Muralt	Frankonia-Suzuki	Suzuki	Accident	

Previous race: 1984 French Grand Prix	FIM Grand Prix World Championship; 1984 season	Next race: 1984 Dutch TT
Previous race: 1983 Yugoslavian Grand Prix	Yugoslavian Grand Prix	Next race: 1985 Yugoslavian Grand Prix
