= 1984 Nations motorcycle Grand Prix =

(Italy) 1984 Nations Grand Prix
Race details
- Race 2 of 12 races in the 1984 Grand Prix motorcycle racing season
- Date: 15 April 1984
- Official name: Gran Premio delle Nazioni
- Location: Circuito Internazionale Santa Monica
- Course: Permanent racing facility; 3.488 km (2.167 mi)

500cc
Pole position
- Rider: (United States) Freddie Spencer
- Time: 1:21.450
Fastest lap
- Rider: (United States) Freddie Spencer
- Time: 1:21.340
Podium
- First: (United States) Freddie Spencer
- Second: (United States) Eddie Lawson
- Third: (France) Raymond Roche

250cc
Pole position
- Rider: (France) Jean-Michel Mattioli
- Time: 1:25.320
Fastest lap
- Rider: (United States) Wayne Rainey
- Time: 1:24.410
Podium
- First: (Italy) Fausto Ricci
- Second: (West Germany) Martin Wimmer
- Third: (United States) Wayne Rainey

125cc
Pole position
- Rider: (Italy) Maurizio Vitali
- Time: 1:28.380
Fastest lap
- Rider: (Spain) Ángel Nieto
- Time: 1:27.300
Podium
- First: (Spain) Ángel Nieto
- Second: (Italy) Maurizio Vitali
- Third: (Italy) Eugenio Lazzarini

80cc
Pole position
- Rider: (Spain) Ricardo Tormo
- Time: 1:35.110
Fastest lap
- Rider: (Italy) Pier Paolo Bianchi
Podium
- First: (Italy) Pier Paolo Bianchi
- Second: (Switzerland) Stefan Dörflinger
- Third: (West Germany) Hubert Abold

The 1984 Nations motorcycle Grand Prix was the second race of the 1984 Grand Prix motorcycle racing season. It took place on the weekend of 13–15 April 1984 at the Circuito Internazionale Santa Monica.

== Classification ==
=== 500 cc ===
Pos.	Rider	Team	Manufacturer	Time/Retired	Points
1	(United States) Freddie Spencer	Honda Racing Corporation	Honda	55'20.550	15
2	(United States) Eddie Lawson	Marlboro Team Agostini	Yamaha	+19.650	12
3	(France) Raymond Roche	Honda Total	Honda	+46.780	10
4	(Australia) Wayne Gardner	Honda Britain	Honda	+51.770	8
5	(Italy) Franco Uncini	HB Suzuki GP Team	Suzuki	+1'03.700	6
6	(United Kingdom) Ron Haslam	Honda Racing Corporation	Honda	+1'04.500	5
7	(Netherlands) Boet van Dulmen		Suzuki	+1'10.720	4
8	(Italy) Virginio Ferrari	Marlboro Team Agostini	Yamaha	+1'11.400	3
9	(West Germany) Reinhold Roth	Romer Racing Suisse	Honda	+1'11.500	2
10	(Italy) Massimo Broccoli		Honda	+1'22.850	1
11	(United Kingdom) Rob McElnea	Heron Team Suzuki	Suzuki	+1 lap	
12	(Belgium) Didier de Radiguès	Team Elf Chevallier Johnson	Honda	+1 lap	
13	(West Germany) Gustav Reiner	Olymp-Hemden Racing	Honda	+1 lap	
14	(Switzerland) Sergio Pellandini	HB Suzuki GP Team	Suzuki	+1 lap	
15	(United Kingdom) Gary Lingham		Suzuki	+1 lap	
16	(Italy) Oscar La Ferla		Suzuki	+1 lap	
17	(United Kingdom) Steve Parrish		Yamaha	+1 lap	
18	(Netherlands) Rob Punt		Suzuki	+1 lap	
19	(United Kingdom) Keith Huewen	David Attwood	Honda	+1 lap	
20	(Italy) Marco Papa		Honda	+2 laps	
21	(Italy) Attilio Riondato		Honda	+2 laps	
22	(Sweden) Peter Sköld		Honda	+2 laps	
23	(Italy) Massimo Brutti		Suzuki	+2 laps	
24	(France) Christophe Guyot		Honda	+2 laps	
25	(Italy) Franco Randazzo		Honda	+2 laps	
Ret	(Switzerland) Wolfgang von Muralt	Frankonia-Suzuki	Suzuki	Retired	
Ret	(Italy) Walter Magliorati		Suzuki	Retired	
Ret	(Sweden) Peter Sjöström		Suzuki	Retired	
Ret	(United Kingdom) Barry Sheene	Heron Team Suzuki	Suzuki	Retired	
Ret	(Finland) Eero Hyvärinen		Suzuki	Retired	
Ret	(Italy) Marco Lucchinelli	Cagiva Motor Italia	Cagiva	Retired	
Ret	(West Germany) Klaus Klein	Dieter Braun Team	Suzuki	Retired	
Ret	(Italy) Raffaele Pasqual		Yamaha	Retired	
Ret	(Italy) Lorenzo Ghiselli	Suzuki	Retired		
Ret	(Italy) Alessandro Valesi		Suzuki	Retired	
Ret	(Italy) Leandro Becheroni		Suzuki	Retired	
DNQ	(Italy) Fabio Biliotti		Honda	Did not qualify	
DNQ	(Italy) Paolo Ferretti		Suzuki	Did not qualify	
DNQ	(France) Louis-Luc Maisto		Honda	Did not qualify	
DNQ	(France) Franck Gross		Honda	Did not qualify	

Previous race: 1984 South African Grand Prix	FIM Grand Prix World Championship; 1984 season	Next race: 1984 Spanish Grand Prix
Previous race: 1983 Nations Grand Prix	Italian Grand Prix	Next race: 1985 Nations Grand Prix
