= 1984 German motorcycle Grand Prix =

(West Germany) 1984 German Grand Prix
Race details
- Race 5 of 12 races in the 1984 Grand Prix motorcycle racing season
- Date: 27 May 1984
- Official name: Grosser Preis von Deutschland
- Location: Nürburgring
- Course: Permanent racing facility; 4.542 km (2.822 mi)

500cc
Pole position
- Rider: (United States) Freddie Spencer
- Time: 1:42.750
Fastest lap
- Rider: Unknown
Podium
- First: (United States) Freddie Spencer
- Second: (United States) Eddie Lawson
- Third: (United States) Randy Mamola

250cc
Pole position
- Rider: (France) Christian Sarron
- Time: 1:49.290
Fastest lap
- Rider: Unknown
Podium
- First: (France) Christian Sarron
- Second: (West Germany) Martin Wimmer
- Third: (West Germany) Manfred Herweh

125cc
Pole position
- Rider: (Italy) Maurizio Vitali
- Time: 1:55.420
Fastest lap
- Rider: Unknown
Podium
- First: (Spain) Ángel Nieto
- Second: (Italy) Luca Cadalora
- Third: (Italy) Eugenio Lazzarini

80cc
Pole position
- Rider: (Spain) Jorge Martínez
- Time: 2:00.550
Fastest lap
- Rider: Unknown
Podium
- First: (Switzerland) Stefan Dörflinger
- Second: (Italy) Pier Paolo Bianchi
- Third: (West Germany) Gerhard Waibel

The 1984 German motorcycle Grand Prix was the fifth round of the 1984 Grand Prix motorcycle racing season. It took place on the weekend of 24–27 May 1984 at the Nürburgring.

== Classification ==
=== 500 cc ===
Pos.	Rider	Team	Manufacturer	Time/Retired	Points
1	(United States) Freddie Spencer	Honda Racing Corporation	Honda	52'37.980	15
2	(United States) Eddie Lawson	Marlboro Team Agostini	Yamaha	+15.950	12
3	(United States) Randy Mamola	RM Promotions	Honda	+41.950	10
4	(United Kingdom) Ron Haslam	Honda Racing Corporation	Honda	+51.770	8
5	(France) Raymond Roche	Honda Total	Honda	+1'03.080	6
6	(Italy) Franco Uncini	HB Suzuki GP Team	Suzuki	+1'07.880	5
7	(Italy) Virginio Ferrari	Marlboro Team Agostini	Yamaha	+1'19.090	4
8	(United Kingdom) Keith Huewen	David Attwood	Honda	+1'25.690	3
9	(Netherlands) Boet van Dulmen		Suzuki	+1'31.110	2
10	(United Kingdom) Barry Sheene	Heron Team Suzuki	Suzuki	+1'38.800	1
11	(United Kingdom) Steve Parrish		Yamaha	+1 lap	
12	(Italy) Massimo Broccoli		Honda	+1 lap	
13	(Netherlands) Rob Punt		Suzuki	+1 lap	
14	(Italy) Fabio Biliotti		Honda	+1 lap	
15	(Italy) Leandro Beccheroni		Suzuki	+1 lap	
16	(Italy) Lorenzo Ghiselli		Suzuki	+1 lap	
17	(Netherlands) Henk van der Mark		Honda	+1 lap	
18	(France) Franck Gross		Honda	+1 lap	
19	(France) Christian le Liard	Team Elf Chevallier Johnson	Chevallier	+1 lap	
20	(Italy) Walter Magliorati		Suzuki	+1 lap	
21	(Italy) Paolo Ferretti		Suzuki	+1 lap	
22	(United Kingdom) Chris Guy		Suzuki	+2 laps	
23	(South Africa) Brett Hudson	Romer Racing Suisse	Honda	+2 laps	
24	(Netherlands) Henk de Vries		Suzuki	+2 laps	
25	(West Germany) Manfred Fischer	Juchem	Suzuki	+2 laps	
26	(Denmark) Børge Nielsen		Suzuki	+2 laps	
27	(West Germany) Hartmut Müller		Suzuki	+3 laps	
28	(West Germany) Wolfgang Schwarz	Honda Britain	Honda	+3 laps	
29	(Italy) Marco Papa		Honda	+14 laps	
Ret	(West Germany) Reinhold Roth	Romer Racing Suisse	Honda	Accident	
Ret	(Belgium) Didier de Radiguès	Team Elf Chevallier Johnson	Honda	Accident	
Ret	(Sweden) Peter Sjöström		Suzuki	Retired	
Ret	(Switzerland) Sergio Pellandini	HB Suzuki GP Team	Suzuki	Retired	
Ret	(West Germany) Lothar Spiegler		Suzuki	Retired	
Ret	(France) Claude Arcieso		Honda	Retired	
Ret	(France) Louis-Luc Maisto		Honda	Retired	
Ret	(West Germany) Rolf Aljes	Juchem	Suzuki	Retired	
Ret	(Switzerland) Wolfgang von Muralt	Frankonia-Suzuki	Suzuki	Retired	
Ret	(United Kingdom) Rob McElnea	Heron Team Suzuki	Suzuki	Accident	
Ret	(West Germany) Gustav Reiner	Olymp-Hemden Racing	Honda	Accident	
Ret	(West Germany) Klaus Klein	Dieter Braun Team	Suzuki	Retired	

Previous race: 1984 Austrian Grand Prix	FIM Grand Prix World Championship; 1984 season	Next race: 1984 French Grand Prix
Previous race: 1983 German Grand Prix	German Grand Prix	Next race: 1985 German Grand Prix
