= 1984 Spanish motorcycle Grand Prix =

(Spain) 1984 Spanish Grand Prix
Race details
- Race 3 of 12 races in the 1984 Grand Prix motorcycle racing season
- Date: 6 May 1984
- Official name: Marlboro Gran Premio de España
- Location: Circuito Permanente del Jarama
- Course: Permanent racing facility; 3.404 km (2.115 mi)

500cc
Pole position
- Rider: (United States) Eddie Lawson
- Time: 1:30.250
Fastest lap
- Rider: (United States) Eddie Lawson
- Time: 1:30.840
Podium
- First: (United States) Eddie Lawson
- Second: (United States) Randy Mamola
- Third: (France) Raymond Roche

250cc
Pole position
- Rider: (Spain) Carlos Cardús
- Time: 1:33.790
Fastest lap
- Rider: (France) Jean-François Baldé
- Time: 1:33.120
Podium
- First: (Spain) Sito Pons
- Second: (France) Christian Sarron
- Third: (Venezuela) Carlos Lavado

125cc
Pole position
- Rider: (Italy) Maurizio Vitali
- Time: 1:37.410
Fastest lap
- Rider: (Spain) Ángel Nieto
- Time: 1:39.870
Podium
- First: (Spain) Ángel Nieto
- Second: (Italy) Eugenio Lazzarini
- Third: (Switzerland) Hans Müller

80cc
Pole position
- Rider: (Spain) Jorge Martínez
- Time: 1:42.010
Fastest lap
- Rider: (West Germany) Hubert Abold
Podium
- First: (Italy) Pier Paolo Bianchi
- Second: (Netherlands) Henk van Kessel
- Third: (Switzerland) Hans Müller

The 1984 Spanish motorcycle Grand Prix was the third round of the 1984 Grand Prix motorcycle racing season. It took place on the weekend of 5–6 May 1984 at the Circuito Permanente del Jarama.

== Classification ==
=== 500 cc ===
Pos.	Rider	Team	Manufacturer	Time/Retired	Points
1	(United States) Eddie Lawson	Marlboro Team Agostini	Yamaha	57'05.350	15
2	(United States) Randy Mamola	RM Promotions	Honda	+17.630	12
3	(France) Raymond Roche	Honda Total	Honda	+38.560	10
4	(United Kingdom) Ron Haslam	Honda Racing Corporation	Honda	+50.190	8
5	(Netherlands) Boet van Dulmen		Suzuki	+54.580	6
6	(West Germany) Gustav Reiner	Olymp-Hemden Racing	Honda	+55.490	5
7	(United Kingdom) Barry Sheene	Heron Team Suzuki	Suzuki	+57.880	4
8	(West Germany) Reinhold Roth	Romer Racing Suisse	Honda	+58.810	3
9	(Italy) Fabio Biliotti		Honda	+1'17.750	2
10	(United Kingdom) Keith Huewen	David Attwood	Honda	+1 lap	1
11	(France) Christophe Guyot		Honda	+1 lap	
12	(Italy) Attilio Riondato	Heron Team Suzuki	Suzuki	+1 lap	
13	(Sweden) Peter Sköld		Honda	+1 lap	
14	(West Germany) Klaus Klein	Dieter Braun Team	Suzuki	+2 laps	
15	(Netherlands) Rob Punt		Suzuki	+2 laps	
16	(Sweden) Peter Sjöström		Suzuki	+2 laps	
17	(Italy) Marco Papa		Honda	+2 laps	
18	(France) Louis-Luc Maisto		Honda	+3 laps	
19	(Spain) José Maria Parra		Suzuki	+4 laps	
20	(South Africa) Brett Hudson		Suzuki	+6 laps	
Ret	(Italy) Leandro Beccheroni		Suzuki	Retired	
Ret	(Italy) Claude Arciero		Honda	Retired	
Ret	(Italy) Walter Magliorati		Suzuki	Retired	
Ret	(Italy) Franco Uncini	HB Suzuki GP Team	Suzuki	Retired	
Ret	(Italy) Franco Randazzo		Honda	Retired	
Ret	(Switzerland) Sergio Pellandini	HB Suzuki GP Team	Suzuki	Retired	
Ret	(France) Christian le Liard	Team Elf Chevallier Johnson	Chevallier	Retired	
Ret	(Italy) Marco Lucchinelli	Cagiva Motor Italia	Cagiva	Retired	
Ret	(Switzerland) Marco Gentile		Yamaha	Retired	
Ret	(Switzerland) Wolfgang von Muralt	Frankonia-Suzuki	Suzuki	Retired	
Ret	(France) Franck Gross		Honda	Retired	
Ret	(Belgium) Didier de Radiguès	Team Elf Chevallier Johnson	Honda	Retired	
Ret	(Italy) Massimo Broccoli		Honda	Retired	
DNS	(Italy) Virginio Ferrari	Marlboro Team Agostini	Yamaha	Did not start	

Previous race: 1984 Nations Grand Prix	FIM Grand Prix World Championship; 1984 season	Next race: 1984 Austrian Grand Prix
Previous race: 1983 Spanish Grand Prix	Spanish Grand Prix	Next race: 1985 Spanish Grand Prix
