= 1984 Austrian motorcycle Grand Prix =

(Austria) 1984 Austrian Grand Prix
Race details
- Race 4 of 12 races in the 1984 Grand Prix motorcycle racing season
- Date: 20 May 1984
- Official name: Großer Preis von Österreich
- Location: Salzburgring
- Course: Permanent racing facility; 4.246 km (2.638 mi)

500cc
Pole position
- Rider: (United States) Randy Mamola
- Time: 1:18.150
Fastest lap
- Rider: Unknown
Podium
- First: (United States) Eddie Lawson
- Second: (United States) Freddie Spencer
- Third: (United States) Randy Mamola

250cc
Pole position
- Rider: (France) Christian Sarron
- Time: 1:24.780
Fastest lap
- Rider: Unknown
Podium
- First: (France) Christian Sarron
- Second: (West Germany) Anton Mang
- Third: (Spain) Sito Pons

125cc
Pole position
- Rider: No 125cc was held
Fastest lap
- Rider: No 125cc was held
Podium
- First: No 125cc was held
- Second: No 125cc was held
- Third: No 125cc was held

80cc
Pole position
- Rider: (Switzerland) Stefan Dörflinger
- Time: 1:35.490
Fastest lap
- Rider: Unknown
Podium
- First: (Switzerland) Stefan Dörflinger
- Second: (West Germany) Hubert Abold
- Third: (West Germany) Gerhard Waibel

The 1984 Austrian motorcycle Grand Prix was the fourth round of the 1984 Grand Prix motorcycle racing season. It took place on the weekend of 18–20 May 1984 at the Salzburgring.

== Classification ==
=== 500 cc ===
Pos.	Rider	Team	Manufacturer	Time/Retired	Points
1	(United States) Eddie Lawson	Marlboro Team Agostini	Yamaha	41'23.540	15
2	(United States) Freddie Spencer	Honda Racing Corporation	Honda	+22.650	12
3	(United States) Randy Mamola	RM Promotions	Honda	+23.990	10
4	(United Kingdom) Ron Haslam	Honda Racing Corporation	Honda	+25.490	8
5	(United Kingdom) Rob McElnea	Heron Team Suzuki	Suzuki	+39.750	6
6	(France) Raymond Roche	Honda Total	Honda	+41.520	5
7	(West Germany) Reinhold Roth	Romer Racing Suisse	Honda	+41.970	4
8	(Netherlands) Boet van Dulmen		Suzuki	+1'14.240	3
9	(Switzerland) Sergio Pellandini	HB Suzuki GP Team	Suzuki	+1'14.420	2
10	(United Kingdom) Barry Sheene	Heron Team Suzuki	Suzuki	+1 lap	1
11	(Italy) Franco Uncini	HB Suzuki GP Team	Suzuki	+1 lap	
12	(Italy) Fabio Biliotti		Honda	+1 lap	
13	(United Kingdom) Keith Huewen	David Attwood	Honda	+1 lap	
14	(Italy) Virginio Ferrari	Marlboro Team Agostini	Yamaha	+1 lap	
15	(West Germany) Klaus Klein	Dieter Braun Team	Suzuki	+1 lap	
16	(Italy) Massimo Broccoli		Honda	+1 lap	
17	(Netherlands) Rob Punt		Suzuki	+1 lap	
18	(Italy) Paolo Ferretti		Suzuki	+1 lap	
19	(Italy) Marco Papa		Honda	+1 lap	
20	(United Kingdom) Chris Guy		Suzuki	+1 lap	
21	(Italy) Lorenzo Ghiselli		Suzuki	+1 lap	
22	(France) Louis-Luc Maisto		Honda	+2 laps	
23	(West Germany) Manfred Fischer	Juchem	Suzuki	+2 laps	
Ret	(Italy) Marco Lucchinelli	Cagiva Motor Italia	Cagiva	Retired	
Ret	(France) Christian le Liard	Team Elf Chevallier Johnson	Chevallier	Retired	
Ret	(France) Franck Gross		Honda	Retired	
Ret	(Sweden) Peter Sjöström		Suzuki	Retired	
Ret	(Italy) Leandro Beccheroni		Suzuki	Retired	
Ret	(Austria) Josef Ragginger		Suzuki	Retired	
Ret	(Austria) Karl Truchsess		Suzuki	Retired	
Ret	(France) Herbert Zwickl		Yamaha	Retired	
Ret	(Belgium) Didier de Radiguès	Team Elf Chevallier Johnson	Honda	Accident	
Ret	(South Africa) Brett Hudson	Romer Racing Suisse	Honda	Retired	
Ret	(Switzerland) Wolfgang von Muralt	Frankonia-Suzuki	Suzuki	Accident	
Ret	(Italy) Attilio Riondato	Heron Team Suzuki	Suzuki	Retired	
Ret	(Sweden) Peter Sköld		Honda	Retired	
DNS	(West Germany) Gustav Reiner	Olymp-Hemden Racing	Honda	Did not start	
DNQ	(Austria) Josef Doppler		Suzuki	Did not qualify	
DNQ	(Japan) Yashuhiko Gomibuchi		Suzuki	Did not qualify	
DNQ	(Austria) H. Schüster		Suzuki	Did not qualify	

Previous race: 1984 Spanish Grand Prix	FIM Grand Prix World Championship; 1984 season	Next race: 1984 German Grand Prix
Previous race: 1983 Austrian Grand Prix	Austrian Grand Prix	Next race: 1985 Austrian Grand Prix
