= Reinhold Roth =

German motorcycle racer (1953–2021)

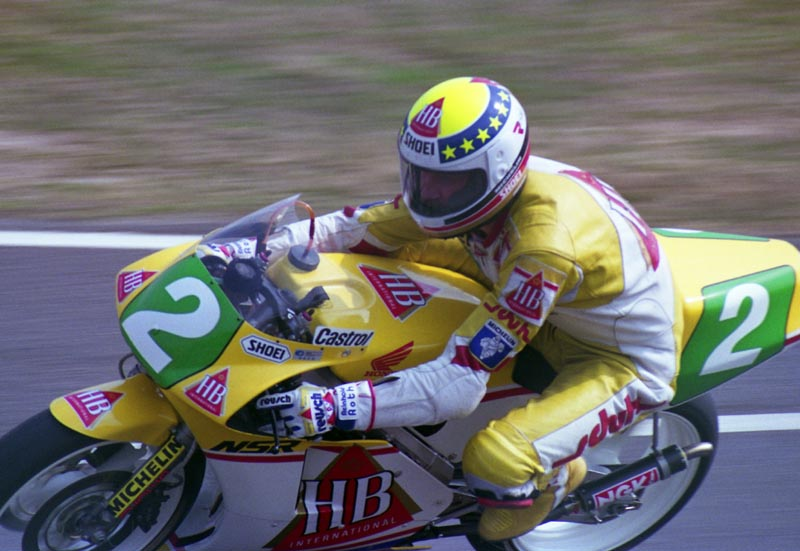
- Roth at Japanese GP in 1990
- Nationality: German
- Born: 4 March 1953; Amtzell, West Germany
- Died: 15 October 2021 (aged 68); Wangen im Allgäu, Germany
Motorcycle racing career statistics
Grand Prix motorcycle racing
Active years	1979 - 1980, 1982 - 1990
First race	1979 350cc Nations Grand Prix
Last race	1990 250cc Yugoslavian Grand Prix
First win	1987 250cc French Grand Prix
Last win	1989 250cc Czechoslovak Grand Prix
Team	Honda
Starts / Wins / Podiums / Poles / F. laps / Points; 96 / 3 / 15 / 2 / 3 / 586

Reinhold Roth (4 March 1953 – 15 October 2021) was a Grand Prix motorcycle road racer from Germany. His most successful years were in 1987, when he won the French Grand Prix, and finished the season in second place behind Anton Mang, and in 1989, when he won the Dutch and Czechoslovak Grand Prix Grand Prix and finished second to Sito Pons for the 250 world championship. Roth suffered severe injuries in a June 1990 racing accident and retired from competition.

== The accident ==
Rijeka (Yugoslavia) 1990 in the 250cc GP a series of events that started with Wilco Zeelenberg falling on Saturday, so he did not race on Sunday, hence there was a free space for the race, and Australian Darren Milner, whose time was out of classification, got a chance to race. Rain started and the race was stopped the lap before the accident, but the flags did not show up on time to stop the leading group. On a left hand curve, all the front riders were at full speed despite rain, including Roth, who collided with Milner who was riding very slow. In fact, Roth got the sixth place for the race, in the last season he was intended to participate. Two months after the accident, he woke up from the coma.

== Motorcycle Grand Prix Results ==
Points system from 1969 to 1987:

**Position**	1	2	3	4	5	6	7	8	9	10
**Points**	15	12	10	8	6	5	4	3	2	1

Points system from 1988 to 1992:

**Position**	1	2	3	4	5	6	7	8	9	10	11	12	13	14	15
**Points**	20	17	15	13	11	10	9	8	7	6	5	4	3	2	1

(key) (Races in bold indicate pole position; races in italics indicate fastest lap)

Year	Class	Team	1	2	3	4	5	6	7	8	9	10	11	12	13	14	15	Points	Rank	Wins
1979	350cc	Yamaha	VEN -	AUT -	GER -	NAT; 8	ESP -	YUG -	NED -	FIN -	GBR -	CZE -	FRA -					3	28th	0
1980	250cc	Yamaha	NAT; 8	ESP; 10	FRA -	YUG -	NED -	BEL -	FIN -	GBR -	CZE -	GER -						4	27th	0
1982	250cc	Yamaha			FRA -	ESP -	NAT -	NED -	BEL -	YUG -	GBR -	SWE -	FIN -	CZE -	RSM; 7	GER -		4	26th	0
1982	500cc	Suzuki	ARG -	AUT; 15	FRA -	ESP -	NAT -	NED -	BEL -	YUG; 13	GBR -	SWE -			RSM -	GER -		0	-	0
1983	250cc	Yamaha	RSA -	FRA; 18	NAT; 11	GER; 5	ESP; 15	AUT; 8	YUG; NC	NED -	BEL -	GBR; 6	SWE; 16					14	17th	0
1984	500cc	Honda	RSA; 11	NAT; 9	ESP; 8	AUT; 7	GER; NC	FRA; 8	YUG; 12	NED; 9	BEL; NC	GBR; 12	SWE; NC	RSM; NC				14	15th	0
1985	250cc	Romer-Juchem	RSA; 22	ESP; 5	GER; 11	NAT; 8	AUT -	YUG; 7	NED -	BEL -	FRA -	GBR; 2	SWE; 13	RSM; 10				29	9th	0
1986	250cc	HB-Honda	ESP; 13	NAT; 15	GER; NC	AUT; 11	YUG; 10	NED; 10	BEL; 16	FRA; 15	GBR; 4	SWE; NC	RSM; 14					10	16th	0
1987	250cc	HB-Honda	JPN; 3	ESP; 8	**GER**; 3	NAT; 2	AUT; 3	YUG; 3	NED; 2	FRA; 1	GBR; 5	SWE; 11	CZE; 10	RSM; 9	POR; 7	BRA; 4	ARG; 6	108	2nd	1
1988	250cc	HB-Honda	JPN -	USA; 9	ESP; 6	EXP; 6	NAT; 6	GER; 5	AUT; 2	NED; 7	BEL; 4	YUG; 4	FRA; 5	GBR; 5	SWE; 4	CZE; 6	BRA; 4	158	5th	0
1989	250cc	HB-Honda	JPN; NC	AUS; 5	USA; 8	ESP; 6	NAT; 5	GER; 2	AUT; 7	YUG; 2	NED; 1	BEL; 4	FRA; 6	GBR; 2	SWE; 2	**CZE**; 1	BRA; 6	190	2nd	2
1990	250cc	HB-Honda	JPN; NC	USA; 4	ESP -	NAT; 7	GER; 7	AUT; 5	YUG; 6	NED -	BEL -	FRA -	GBR -	SWE -	CZE -	HUN -	AUS -	52	14th	0
