= 1984 French motorcycle Grand Prix =

(France) 1984 French Grand Prix
Race details
- Race 6 of 12 races in the 1984 Grand Prix motorcycle racing season
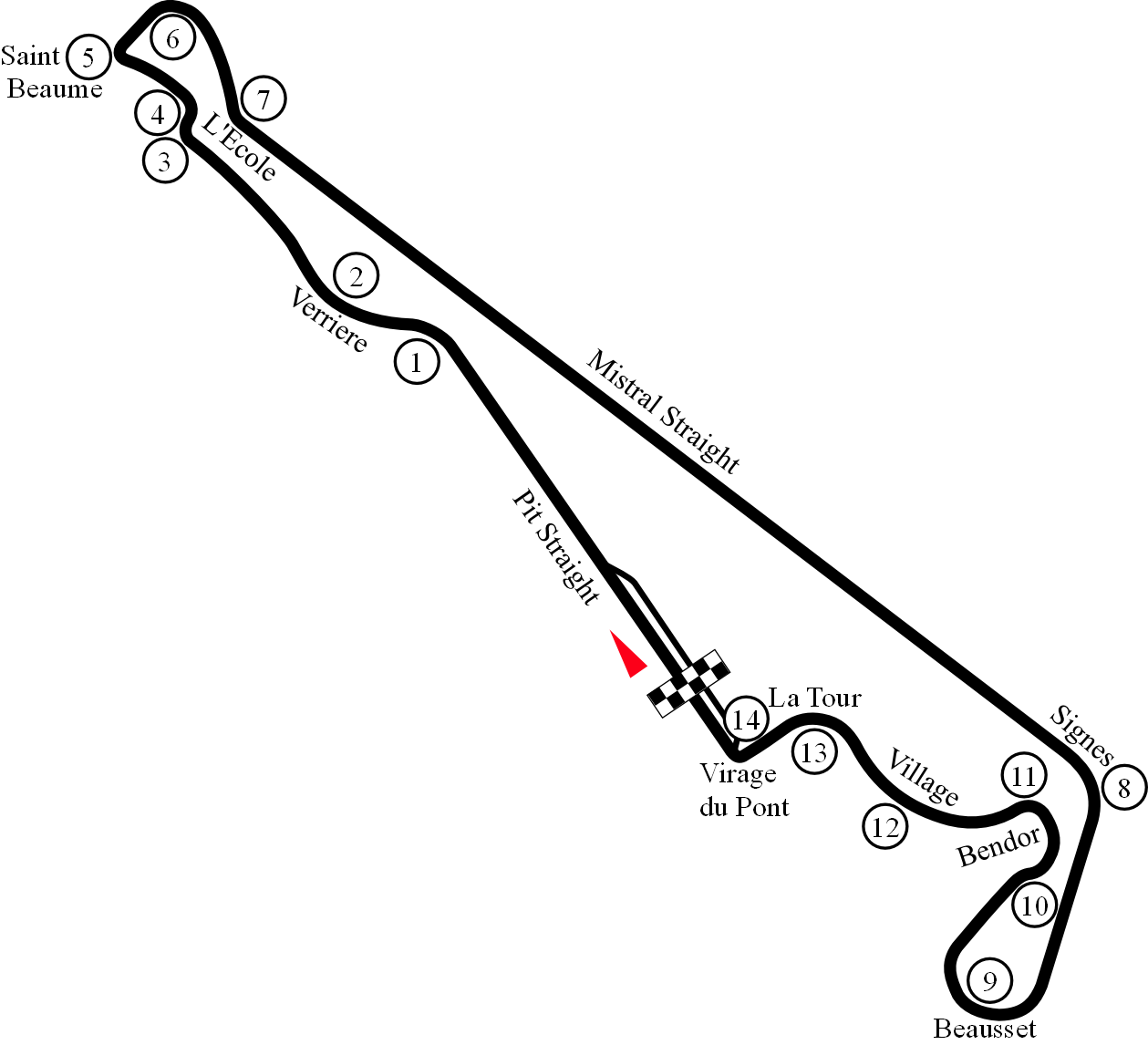
- Date: 11 June 1984
- Official name: Grand Prix de France Moto
- Location: Circuit Paul Ricard
- Course: Permanent racing facility; 5.809 km (3.610 mi)

500cc
Pole position
- Rider: (United States) Freddie Spencer
- Time: 2:01.410
Fastest lap
- Rider: (United States) Freddie Spencer
Podium
- First: (United States) Freddie Spencer
- Second: (United States) Eddie Lawson
- Third: (United States) Randy Mamola

250cc
Pole position
- Rider: (France) Christian Sarron
- Time: 2:08.560
Fastest lap
- Rider: (West Germany) Anton Mang
Podium
- First: (West Germany) Anton Mang
- Second: (Venezuela) Carlos Lavado
- Third: (West Germany) Manfred Herweh

125cc
Pole position
- Rider: (Italy) Eugenio Lazzarini
- Time: 2:15.180
Fastest lap
- Rider: (Spain) Ángel Nieto
- Time: 2:14.270
Podium
- First: (Spain) Ángel Nieto
- Second: (Italy) Eugenio Lazzarini
- Third: (Austria) August Auinger

80cc
Pole position
- Rider: No 80cc race was held
Fastest lap
- Rider: No 80cc race was held
Podium
- First: No 80cc race was held
- Second: No 80cc race was held
- Third: No 80cc race was held

The 1984 French motorcycle Grand Prix was the sixth round of the 1984 Grand Prix motorcycle racing season. It took place on the weekend of 10–11 July 1984 at the Paul Ricard Circuit.

== Classification ==
=== 500 cc ===
Pos.	Rider	Team	Manufacturer	Time/Retired	Points
1	(United States) Freddie Spencer	Honda Racing Corporation	Honda	43'31.920	15
2	(United States) Eddie Lawson	Marlboro Team Agostini	Yamaha	+5.790	12
3	(United States) Randy Mamola	RM Promotions	Honda	+6.230	10
4	(United Kingdom) Ron Haslam	Honda Racing Corporation	Honda	+49.500	8
5	(United Kingdom) Barry Sheene	Heron Team Suzuki	Suzuki	+1'11.040	6
6	(Belgium) Didier de Radiguès	Team Elf Chevallier Johnson	Honda	+1'11.550	5
7	(Italy) Massimo Broccoli		Honda	+1'13.240	4
8	(West Germany) Reinhold Roth	Romer Racing Suisse	Honda	+1'51.540	3
9	(Switzerland) Sergio Pellandini	HB Suzuki GP Team	Suzuki	+2'01.120	2
10	(Switzerland) Wolfgang von Muralt	Frankonia-Suzuki	Suzuki	+2'09.940	1
11	(Zimbabwe) Dave Petersen		Suzuki	+2'12.500	
12	(Italy) Fabio Biliotti		Honda	+2'19.700	
13	(Netherlands) Henk van der Mark		Honda	+1 lap	
14	(United Kingdom) Keith Huewen	David Attwood	Honda	+1 lap	
15	(France) Louis-Luc Maisto		Honda	+1 lap	
16	(Italy) Lorenzo Ghiselli		Suzuki	+1 lap	
17	(France) Maurice Coq		Suzuki	+1 lap	
18	(Italy) Claude Arciero		Honda	+1 lap	
19	(Italy) Attilio Riondato	Heron Team Suzuki	Suzuki	+1 lap	
20	(Switzerland) Marco Gentile		Yamaha	+1 lap	
21	(Italy) Leandro Beccheroni		Suzuki	+1 lap	
22	(Italy) Virginio Ferrari	Marlboro Team Agostini	Yamaha	+1 lap	
23	(United Kingdom) Alan Irwin		Suzuki	+2 laps	
Ret	(Netherlands) Rob Punt		Suzuki	Retired	
Ret	(Italy) Walter Magliorati		Suzuki	Retired	
Ret	(Italy) Paolo Ferretti		Suzuki	Retired	
Ret	(United Kingdom) Rob McElnea	Heron Team Suzuki	Suzuki	Accident	
Ret	(Netherlands) Boet van Dulmen		Suzuki	Accident	
Ret	(France) Raymond Roche	Honda Total	Honda	Retired	
Ret	(Finland) Eero Hyvärinen		Suzuki	Retired	
Ret	(France) Hervé Moineau	Cagiva Motor Italia	Cagiva	Retired	
Ret	(South Africa) Brett Hudson	Romer Racing Suisse	Honda	Accident	
Ret	(Sweden) Peter Sjöström		Suzuki	Retired	
Ret	(France) Franck Gross		Honda	Retired	
Ret	(Denmark) Börge Nielsen		Suzuki	Retired	
DNS	(Japan) Takazumi Katayama	Honda Racing Corporation	Honda	Did not start	
DNS	(Italy) Franco Uncini	HB Suzuki GP Team	Suzuki	Did not start	
DNS	(France) Christian le Liard	Team Elf Chevallier Johnson	Chevallier	Did not start	
DNS	(Italy) Marco Lucchinelli	Cagiva Motor Italia	Cagiva	Did not start	
DNQ	(France) Marie-Paul Violland		Yamaha	Did not qualify	
DNQ	(France) René Lavigne		Honda	Did not qualify	
DNQ	(France) Éric Saul		Paton	Did not qualify	
DNQ	(Greece) Dimitrios Papandreou		Yamaha	Did not qualify	
DNQ	(France) Jean-Louis Battistini		Yamaha	Did not qualify	
DNQ	(Spain) Pablo Esposito		Suzuki	Did not qualify	

Previous race: 1984 German Grand Prix	FIM Grand Prix World Championship; 1984 season	Next race: 1984 Yugoslavian Grand Prix
Previous race: 1983 French Grand Prix	French Grand Prix	Next race: 1985 French Grand Prix
