= Casal =

Portuguese motorcycle manufacturer

Metalurgia Casal
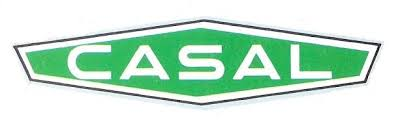
- Type: Private
- Industry: Motorcycle
- Founded: 1964 as "Metalurgia Casal"
- Headquarters: Aveiro, Portugal
- Key people: Franz Kulzer; João Francisco Casal; Robert Zipprich

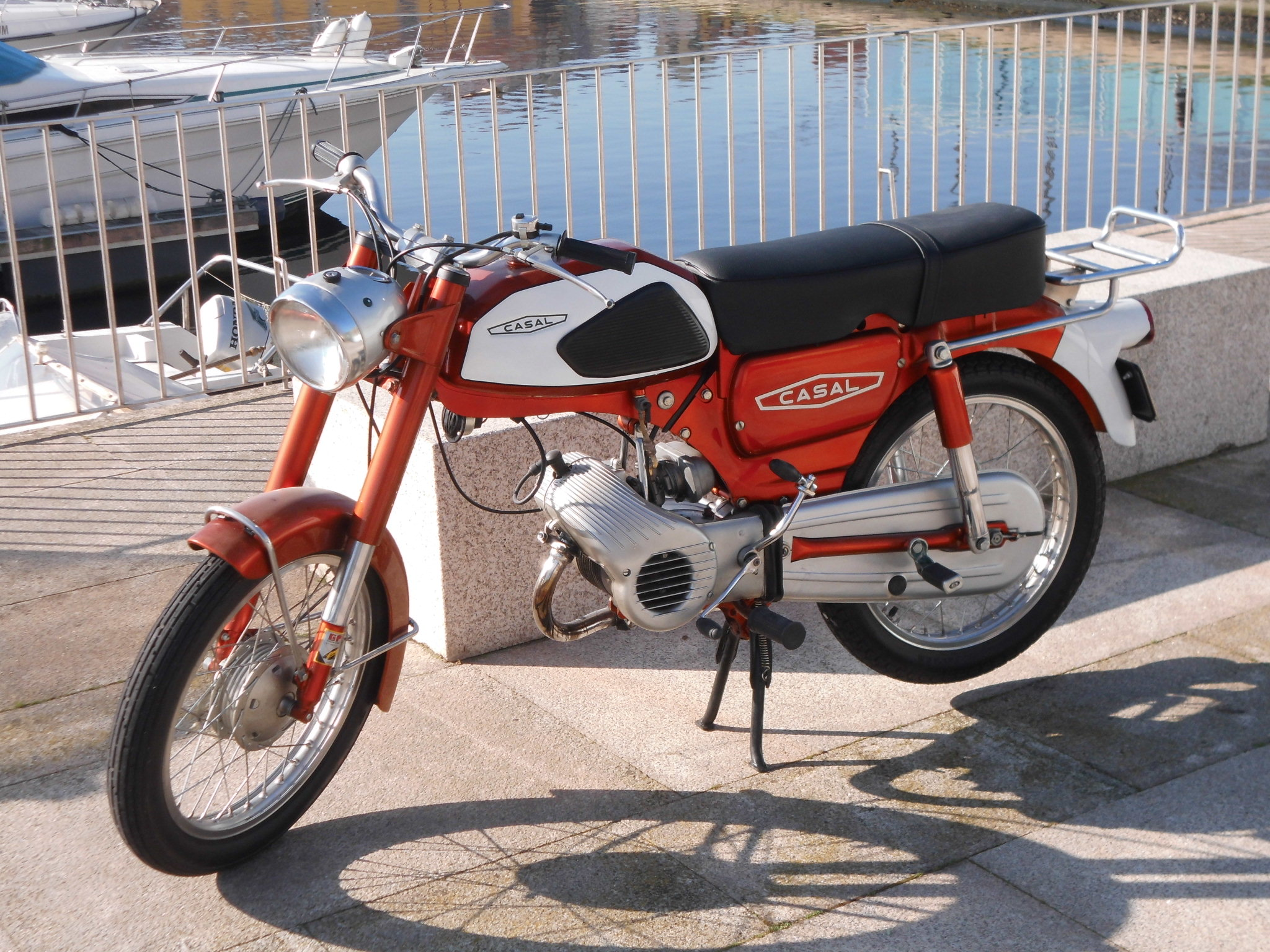
Casal K181

Metallurgia Casal was the largest Portuguese motorcycle manufacturer, based in Aveiro. It was founded in 1964 with João Casal as the managing director and Robert Zipprich and other ex-Zundapp engineers as the technical managers. Its first products included agricultural machinery and two strokes' moped engines based on Zundapp ones. By 1967 it was producing complete motorcycles, the first one being a scooter, the S170 Carina - a copy of the Zundapp R50 - with a 50cc and 4 speed engine. Shortly after it rolled out its first mopeds, the K160, K161, K162 and K163 with two speeds, and the K181 with four speeds. Although most of its production were mopeds, it also produced 125cc bikes, namely the K260, K270 and K276 all, and it had an advanced plan for a 250cc, the K280. Its range included some 30 or more models, with automatic engines, 2 speed, 4 speed, 5 speed and 6 speed engines Even though its main market was, by far, the domestic market, it also exported some 10% of its production, mostly to the UK, Netherlands, Denmark and Sweden. It also had a promising joint venture with Solo of Germany under which some models were sold in the German market under the Solo brand. Car production was also planned, but not realised. As the increased purchasing power in their home country Portugal, their most important market, slowed the sales of mopeds, bankruptcy was a fact in February 2000. In connection with this, unfortunately, parts of the company's archives were destroyed.

Especially in the 1970s and 1980s, Casal set up various partnerships whose aim was to improve its racing capabilities. The first one was set up in 1971–72 with a Dutch company prior to Huvo and involved the development of Casal's M154 engine (50cc, 5 speed) for its use as a motocross engine. The engine was ready just before the start of the Portuguese 1972 motocross championship and it became an instant hit. Both in 1972 and 1973 Casal was the undisputed leader in local motocross championship which at that time attracted crowds almost as large as those of big football matches. Further to this, Casal set up at least two other quite important partnerships, both also in the 70s, first with Huvo of Holland and shortly afterwards with Villa of Italy. With Huvo the partnership focused in the development of 50cc racing engines both for road and offroad racing and it proved so successful that they were extensively used in races in the mid 1970s mostly in Portugal but also, to a lesser extent, in Holland and other European countries. With Villa the focus was mostly on the development of offroad bikes of 50cc and 125cc even though Casal also worked with the Italian company on the manufacture of parts for one of Villa's 250cc racing engines. The best known project of these partnerships was the development of a racer to participate in the World Motorcycle Championships in 80cc class on 1984 and 1985 with excellent results in both seasons.

Although production at the Casal factory ceased in 2000, the vehicles remain in use in Portugal. Collector interest exists in Portugal, the United Kingdom, and Sweden, with notable models including the K166 Boss, K181, K185 Trial, K270, S170, and the K190.

Among the most interesting Casal models of its last years are the Magnum, the RZ50 and the Arizona, all of them racers powered with the M105 water cooled 6 speed engine. Some of these models where chosen to be modified " bored out up to 92cc or even more for increased performance. Motoplat ignition and carburetors of up to 32mm flat with bored jets, a lightweight crank, rod and piston.The best exhaust was hand built by a local guy using his one bike as test bench. His bike would give a run to the Suzuki RGV 250 or some other 600cc 4 stroke bikes up to 180 km/h.

Today it operates as a Suzuki representative in Portugal.

== World records ==
In 1980 Jan Nijhuys took a 1/4 mile record with a Casal Sparta Plompen. Quarter mile was covered in 15,26 seconds and record speed after 402m where 94.29 km/h.

In 1981 the Dutch Jan Huberts bettered the 50cc speed record with a HuVo-Casal to 224 km/h.

== Racing ==
To become competitive, Casal made a partnership with the Dutch company HuVo.

This joint venture made possible to score great results in offroad and road racing competitions. Casal-HuVo joined World Grand Prix in 80cc class on 1984 and 1985 seasons.
