= 1984 South African motorcycle Grand Prix =

First round of the 1984 Grand Prix motorcycle racing season

(South Africa) 1984 South African Grand Prix
Race details
- Race 1 of 12 races in the 1984 Grand Prix motorcycle racing season
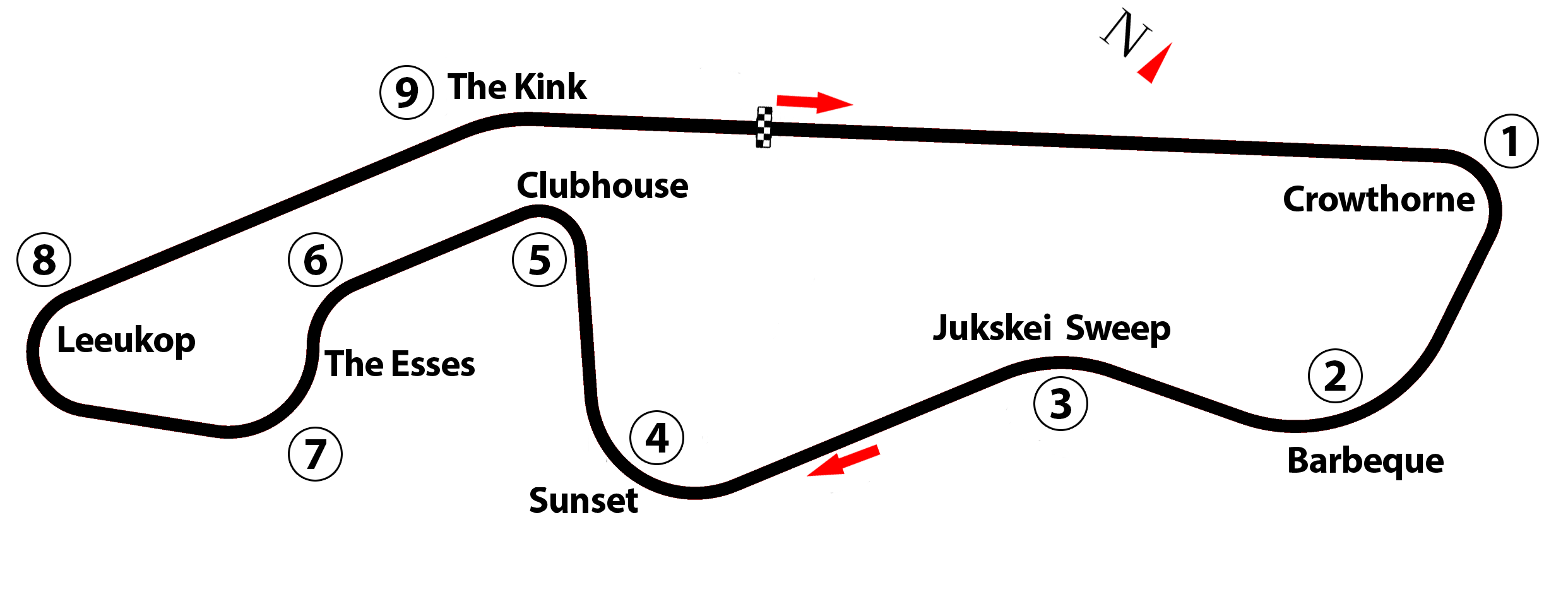
- Date: 24 March 1984
- Official name: Technics Motorcycle Grand Prix
- Location: Kyalami
- Course: Permanent racing facility; 4.104 km (2.550 mi)

500cc
Pole position
- Rider: (United States) Freddie Spencer
- Time: 1:24.200
Fastest lap
- Rider: (United Kingdom) Barry Sheene
- Time: 1:42.390
Podium
- First: (United States) Eddie Lawson
- Second: (France) Raymond Roche
- Third: (United Kingdom) Barry Sheene

250cc
Pole position
- Rider: (South Africa) Mario Rademeyer
- Time: 1:31.130
Fastest lap
- Rider: (France) Patrick Fernandez
- Time: 1:36.520
Podium
- First: (France) Patrick Fernandez
- Second: (France) Christian Sarron
- Third: (Spain) Sito Pons

125cc
Pole position
- Rider: No 125cc was held
Fastest lap
- Rider: No 125cc was held
Podium
- First: No 125cc was held
- Second: No 125cc was held
- Third: No 125cc was held

80cc
Pole position
- Rider: No 80cc was held
Fastest lap
- Rider: No 80cc was held
Podium
- First: No 80cc was held
- Second: No 80cc was held
- Third: No 80cc was held

The 1984 South African motorcycle Grand Prix was the first round of the 1984 Grand Prix motorcycle racing season. It took place on the weekend of 22–24 March 1984 at the Kyalami circuit.

== Classification ==
=== 500 cc ===
Pos.	Rider	Team	Manufacturer	Time/Retired	Points
1	(United States) Eddie Lawson	Team Marlboro Agostini	Yamaha	53'22.400	15
2	(France) Raymond Roche	Honda Total	Honda	+12.600	12
3	(United Kingdom) Barry Sheene	Heron Suzuki	Suzuki	+12.900	10
4	(Belgium) Didier de Radiguès	Team Elf Chevallier Johnson	Chevallier-Honda	+35.800	8
5	(United States) Sergio Pellandini		Honda	+1'03.800	6
6	(Italy) Massimo Broccoli		Honda	+1'29.600	5
7	(Netherlands) Boet van Dulmen		Suzuki	+1 lap	4
8	(France) Christian Le Liard	Team Elf Chevallier Johnson	Chevallier-Honda	+1 lap	3
9	(France) Christophe Guyot		Honda	+1 lap	2
10	(South Africa) Brett Hudson	Romer Racing Suisse	Honda	+2 laps	1
11	(West Germany) Reinhold Roth	Romer Racing Suisse	Honda	+4 laps	
12	(Greece) Dimitris Papandreou		Yamaha	+6 laps	
13	(West Germany) Klaus Klein	Dieter Braun Team	Suzuki	+7 laps	
Ret	(Italy) Marco Lucchinelli	Cagiva Motor Italia	Cagiva	Retired	
Ret	(United Kingdom) Ron Haslam	Honda Racing Corporation	Honda	Accident	
Ret	(Italy) Franco Uncini	HB Suzuki GP Team	Suzuki	Retired	
Ret	(Italy) Virginio Ferrari	Team Marlboro Agostini	Yamaha	Retired	
Ret	(West Germany) Gustav Reiner	Olymp-Hemden Racing	Honda	Retired	
DNS	(United States) Freddie Spencer	Honda Racing Corporation	Honda	Did not start	

Previous race: 1983 San Marino Grand Prix	FIM Grand Prix World Championship; 1984 season	Next race: 1984 Nations Grand Prix
Previous race: 1983 South African Grand Prix	South African Grand Prix	Next race: 1985 South African Grand Prix
