= Harmsen =

Harmsen is a Dutch patronymic surname, meaning "son of Harm" (a version of Herman). Notable people with the surname include@

- Bill Harmsen (1912–2002), American businessman
- Daniëlle Harmsen (born 1986), Dutch tennis player
- Eelco Martinus ten Harmsen van der Beek (1897–1953), Dutch illustrator
- Hans Harmsen (1899–1989), German eugenicist who became a founding member of the International Planned Parenthood Federation.
- Jessica Harmsen, Australian television presenter
- Jessica Harmsen (chess player) (born 1966), Dutch chess player
- Joris Harmsen (born 1992), Dutch BMX rider
- Sallie Harmsen (born 1989), Dutch actress
