= Waibel =

Waibel is a German surname. Notable people with the surname include:

- Alex Waibel, German computer scientist
- Bruce Waibel (1958–2003), American musician
- Craig Waibel (born 1975), American soccer player
- Eva Maria Waibel (born 1953), Austrian politician
- Gerhard Waibel (engineer) (born 1938), German aerospace engineer
- Gerhard Waibel (motorcyclist) (born 1958), German motorcycle racer
- Wolfram Waibel Jr. (born 1970), Austrian sport shooter
- Wolfram Waibel Sr. (1947–2023), Austrian sport shooter
