= Maurizio Vitali =

Italian motorcycle racer (born 1957)

- Nationality: Italian
Motorcycle racing career statistics
Grand Prix motorcycle racing
Active years	1981 - 1993
First race	1981 125cc Austrian Grand Prix
Last race	1993 125cc German Grand Prix
First win	1983 125cc San Marino Grand Prix
Last win	1984 125cc San Marino Grand Prix
Starts / Wins / Podiums / Poles / F. laps / Points; 121 / 2 / 7 / 5 / 1 / 281

Maurizio Vitali (born 17 March 1957) is an Italian former Grand Prix motorcycle road racer. His best year was in 1984 when he finished fourth in the 125cc world championship. He is part of Valentino Rossi's team. He was the 1983 and 1991 Italian 125cc Champion, and the 1984 and 1987 Italian 250cc Champion.
