= Hubert Abold =

German motorcycle racer (born 1958)

Hubert Abold (born 13 June 1958) is a German retired professional Grand Prix motorcycle road racer. He won the 80 cc European Championship in 1983. He was runner-up in the 80 cc World Championship, as teammate to Champion Stefan Dörflinger in 1984.

Sporting positions
Preceded by (Socialist Federal Republic of Yugoslavia) Zdravko Matulja	80 cc motorcycle European Champion; 1983	Succeeded by (Germany) Richard Bay
