= Stefan Dörflinger =

Swiss motorcycle racer

- Nationality: Swiss
- Born: 23 December 1948 (age 77); Nagold, Germany
Motorcycle racing career statistics
Grand Prix motorcycle racing
Active years	1973 - 1990
First race	1973 50 cc Yugoslavian Grand Prix
Last race	1990 125 cc Hungarian Grand Prix
First win	1980 50 cc Belgian Grand Prix
Last win	1988 80 cc Spanish Grand Prix
Team(s)	Kreidler, Zündapp, Krauser, LCR
Championships	50 cc- 1982, 1983 80 cc- 1984, 1985
Starts / Wins / Podiums / Poles / F. laps / Points; 159 / 18 / 58 / 34 / 0 / 1080

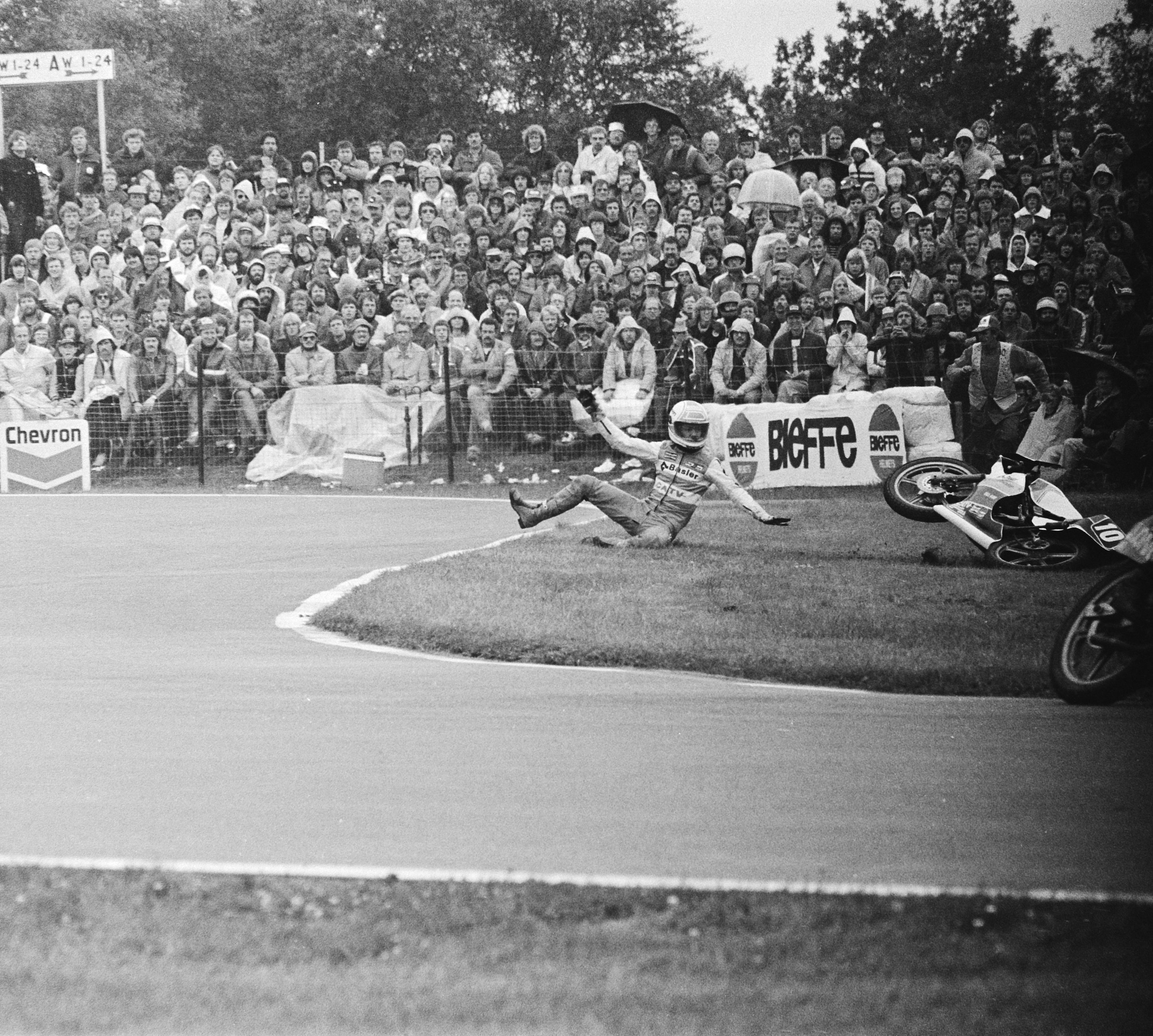
TT Assen Stefan Dörflinger valt ( 125 cc ), Bestanddeelnr 930-9035.jpg

Stefan Dörflinger (born 23 December 1948 in Nagold, Germany) is a Swiss former Grand Prix motorcycle road racer.

Dörflinger won four consecutive FIM road racing world championships. In 1982 and 1983, he was the 50 cc world champion. In 1984, the FIM increased the displacement capacity to 80 cc and Dörflinger would become the first ever 80 cc world champion. He successfully defended his title in 1985. His lengthy Grand Prix career spanned 18 seasons.
