= Jorge Martínez (motorcyclist) =

Spanish motorcycle racer (born 1962)

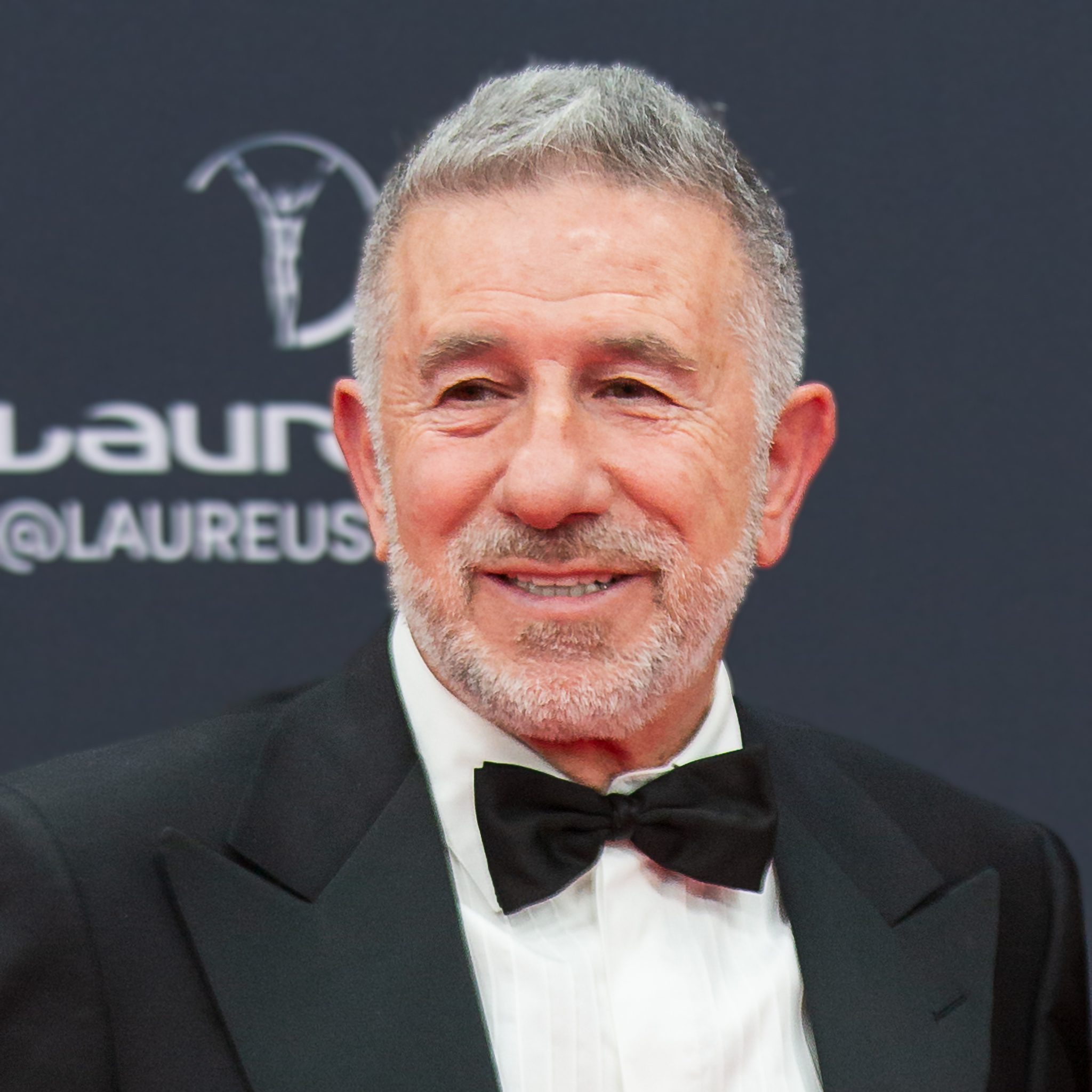
- Martínez in 2024
- Nationality: Spanish
- Born: 29 August 1962 (age 64); Alzira, Valencia, Spain
Motorcycle racing career statistics
Grand Prix motorcycle racing
Active years	1982 - 1997
First race	1982 50 cc Spanish Grand Prix
Last race	1997 125 cc Australian Grand Prix
First win	1984 80 cc Dutch TT
Last win	1994 125 cc Argentine Grand Prix
Team	Derbi
Championships	80 cc - 1986, 1987, 1988 125 cc - 1988
Starts / Wins / Podiums / Poles / F. laps / Points; 196 / 37 / 61 / 19 / 11 / 1599

Jorge Martínez Salvadores (born 29 August 1962), nicknamed "Aspar", is a Spanish former professional motorcycle racer and racing team manager. He competed in the Grand Prix road racing world championships from 1982 to 1997.

Martínez is one of the most successful motorcycle racers in Grand Prix motorcycle racing history with 22 Grand Prix victories to his name in the 80 cc class and a further 15 wins in the 125 cc class.

After retiring from active competition, Martínez became a successful motorcycle racing team owner. In 2019, Martínez was inducted into the MotoGP Hall of Fame.

== Motorcycle racing career ==
Martínez was born in Alzira, Valencia, Spain. He entered his first Grand Prix in 1982. Between 1986 and 1988, he claimed a total of four World Championships in these two categories, three times in the 80cc event and once at 125 cc. In 1988, he achieved the ‘double’, taking both crowns that year. His nickname was "Aspar", a Spanish link with the shoe making industry which was given to him as a direct result of his father’s occupation as a cobbler.

== Racing team owner ==
After his competitive career had ended in 1997, Martínez went on to create and manage the Aspar Team. In the 2010 season, Aspar team rider Nicolás Terol finished in second place in the 125cc class while his teammate Bradley Smith finished fourth, both riding Aprilia RSA 125 motorcycles. Julián Simón finished in second place in the inaugural Moto2 campaign, with teammate Mike Di Meglio finishing in 20th place on Honda-powered Suter chassis. Aspar rider Héctor Barberá finished in 12th place in the MotoGP division aboard a Ducati Desmosedici GP10.

Martínez was inducted into the MotoGP Hall of Fame in 2019.

== Complete Grand Prix motorcycle racing results ==
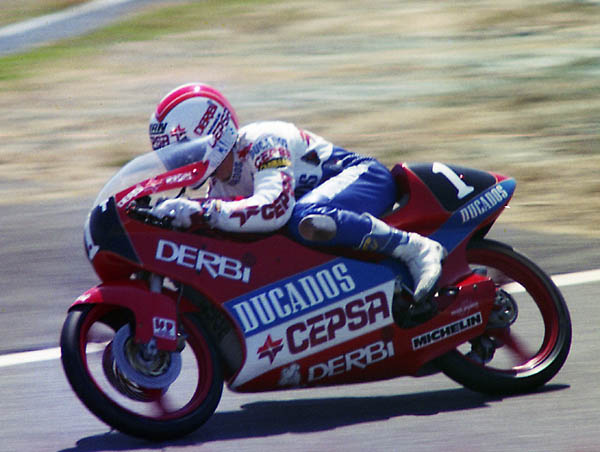
Martínez at the 1989 Japanese Grand Prix

Points system from 1969 to 1987:

**Position**	1	2	3	4	5	6	7	8	9	10
**Points**	15	12	10	8	6	5	4	3	2	1

Points system from 1988 to 1992:

**Position**	1	2	3	4	5	6	7	8	9	10	11	12	13	14	15
**Points**	20	17	15	13	11	10	9	8	7	6	5	4	3	2	1

Points system from 1993 onwards:

**Position**	1	2	3	4	5	6	7	8	9	10	11	12	13	14	15
**Points**	25	20	16	13	11	10	9	8	7	6	5	4	3	2	1

(key) (Races in bold indicate pole position; races in italics indicate fastest lap)

Year	Class	Bike	1	2	3	4	5	6	7	8	9	10	11	12	13	14	15	Points	Rank	Wins
1982	50cc	Motul	ESP; 6	NAT -	NED -	YUG; 6	RSM -	GER -										10	11th	0
1983	50cc	-	FRA -	NAT -	GER -	ESP; 3	YUG -	NED -	RSM -									10	13th	0
1984	80cc	Derbi	NAT; 7	ESP; 8	AUT; 5	GER; NC	YUG; 3	NED; 1	BEL; 2	RSM; 2								62	4th	1
1985	80cc	Derbi	ESP; 1	GER; NC	NAT; 1	YUG; 2	NED; 3	FRA; NC	RSM; 1									67	**2nd**	3
1986	80cc	Derbi	ESP; 1	NAT; 2	GER; NC	AUT; 1	YUG; 1	NED; 1	GBR; 3	SWE -	RSM; 2	BWU; NC						94	**1st**	4
1987	80cc	Derbi	ESP; 1	GER; 2	NAT; 1	AUT; 1	YUG; 1	NED; 1	GBR; 1	TCH; 2	RSM; NC	POR; 1						129	**1st**	7
1988	80cc	Derbi	ESP; 2	EXP; 1	NAT; 1	GER; 1		NED; 1	YUG; 1				TCH; 1					137	**1st**	6
1988	125cc	Derbi	**ESP**; 1	**NAT**; 1	GER; NC	**AUT**; 1	NED; 1	**BEL**; 1	**YUG**; 1	FRA; 1	GBR; 2	**SWE**; 1	TCH; 1					197	**1st**	9
1989	80cc	Derbi			ESP; NC	NAT; 1	GER; NC	YUG; NC	NED; NC					TCH; 3				35	8th	1
1989	125cc	Derbi	JPN; NC	**AUS**; NC	ESP; 2	NAT; NC	GER; NC	**AUT**; DNS	NED; 7	BEL; NC	**FRA**; 1	GBR; NC	SWE; 4	TCH; 4				72	9th	1
1990	125cc	JJ Cobas	JPN; NC		**ESP**; 1	**NAT**; 1	GER; NC	AUT; 1	**YUG**; NC	NED; 5	**BEL**; NC	FRA; 6	GBR; 4	SWE; 17	TCH; 8	HUN; NC	AUS; 13	105	6th	3
1990	250cc	JJ Cobas	JPN; NC	USA; 16	ESP; NC	NAT; 12	GER; NC	AUT; 14	YUG -	NED; 14	BEL; NC	FRA; NC	GBR; NC	SWE; NC	TCH; 19	HUN; NC	AUS; 11	13	24th	0
1991	125cc	JJ Cobas-Honda	JPN; 5	AUS; 10	ESP; 5	ITA; NC	GER; 6	AUT; 7	EUR; 4	NED; 14	FRA; 11	GBR; 6	RSM; 7	TCH; 4	MAL; NC			99	6th	0
1992	125cc	Honda	JPN; NC	AUS; 6	MAL; 4	ESP; 9	ITA; 6	EUR; 10	GER; NC	NED; 5	HUN; NC	FRA; 3	GBR; 8	BRA; 2	RSA; 1			83	7th	1
1993	125cc	Honda	AUS; NC	MAL; 10	JPN; 9	ESP; 7	AUT; 17	GER; 13	NED; DNF	EUR; 6	RSM; 7	GBR; 11	CZE; 8	ITA; 12	USA; 12	FIM; 7		74	8th	0
1993	250cc	-	AUS -	MAL -	JPN -	ESP -	AUT -	GER -	NED -	EUR -	RSM; NC	GBR -	CZE -	ITA -	USA -	FIM -		0	-	0
1994	125cc	Yamaha	AUS; NC	MAL; 3	JPN; 7	ESP; 9	AUT; 17	GER; 7	NED; 2	ITA; 7	FRA; 6	GBR; 10	CZE; 4	USA; 5	ARG; 1	EUR; NC		135	6th	1
1995	125cc	Yamaha	AUS; 13	MAL; 20	JPN; NC	ESP; 13	GER; NC	ITA; NC	NED; NC	FRA; NC	GBR; 8	CZE; 18	BRA; 11	ARG; 8	EUR; NC			27	18th	0
1996	125cc	Aprilia	MAL; NC	INA; 5	JPN; 8	**ESP**; NC	ITA; 13	FRA; NC	NED; 9	**GER**; 7	GBR; 4	AUT; 6	CZE; 2	**IMO**; 3	CAT; 8	BRA; 4	AUS; 4	131	5th	0
1997	125cc	Aprilia	MAL; 6	JPN; 5	**ESP**; 3	**ITA**; 2	AUT; NC	FRA -	NED; 6	IMO; 6	GER; 6	BRA; 7	GBR; NC	CZE; NC	CAT; 12	**INA**; 3	AUS; 13	119	6th	0

Sporting positions
Preceded by Ricardo Tormo	Spanish 80cc Champion; 1981-1986	Succeeded by Manuel Herreros
Preceded by Andrés Sánchez Marín	Spanish 125cc Champion; 1988	Succeeded by Manuel Hernández
Preceded by Manuel Herreros	Spanish 80cc Champion; 1988-1990	Succeeded by Carlos Giró
Preceded by Manolo Martín	Spanish 250cc Champion; 1990	Succeeded by Ferrán Mas
Preceded by Dirk Raudies	Spanish 125cc Champion; 1994	Succeeded by Emilio Alzamora
