= John Kocinski =

American motorcycle racer

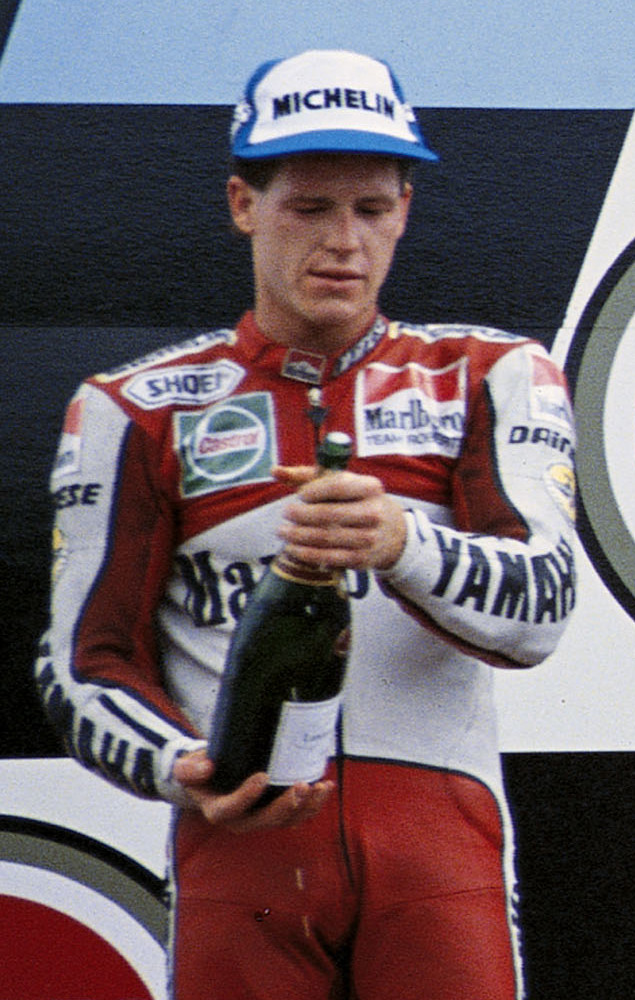
- Kocinski at the 1992 Dutch TT
- Nationality: American
- Born: March 20, 1968 (age 58)
Motorcycle racing career statistics
Grand Prix motorcycle racing
| Active years | 1988 - 1994, 1998 - 1999 |
| First race | 1988 250cc Japanese Grand Prix |
| Last race | 1999 500cc Argentine Grand Prix |
| First win | 1989 250cc Japanese Grand Prix |
| Last win | 1994 500cc Australian Grand Prix |
| Team(s) | Yamaha, Suzuki, Cagiva, Kanemoto Honda |
| Championships | 1 (250cc - 1990) |
Starts / Wins / Podiums / Poles / F. laps / Points; 99 / 13 / 35 / 20 / 15 / 1037.5
Superbike World Championship
| Active years | 1996 - 1997 |
| Manufacturers | Ducati, Honda |
| Championships | 1 (1997) |
| 1997 championship position | 1st |
Starts / Wins / Podiums / Poles / F. laps / Points; 48 / 14 / 29 / 6 / 11 / 753

John Kocinski (born March 20, 1968, in Little Rock, Arkansas) is an American retired Grand Prix motorcycle road racer whose successes include winning the 1990 250cc World Championship and the 1997 Superbike World Championship title.

== Career ==
=== Early years ===
At the age of 17, Kocinski was already a factory rider for Yamaha, in the AMA Championship Cup. He won the AMA 250 Grand Prix Championship every year from 1987 to 1989, and won the 1989 Supersport race at Daytona having started 53rd in a field of 80 riders. In 1988, he won the pole position at the 250cc US Grand Prix and finished the race in fourth place. He would also place fifth at 1988 250cc Japanese Grand Prix.

=== Middle years ===
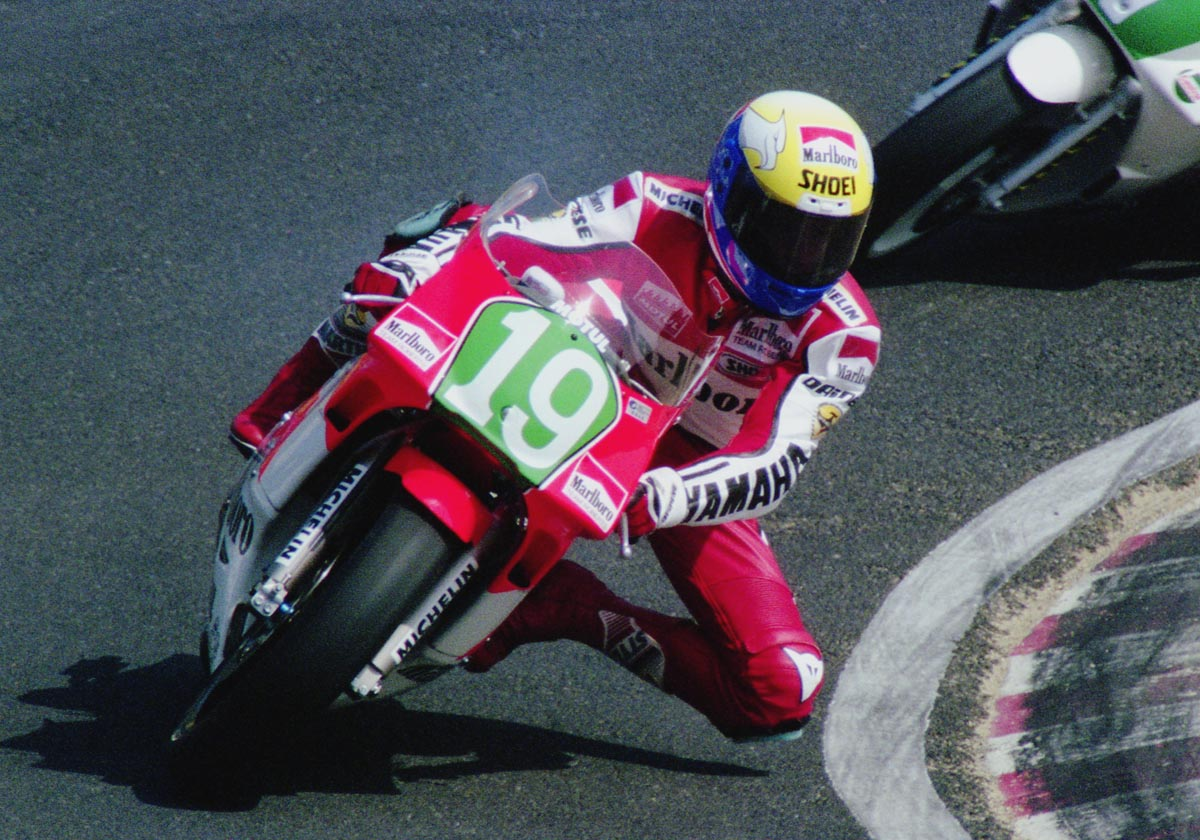
Kocinski at the 1990 Japanese Grand Prix

1989 was also the year of Kocinski's 500cc World Championship debut. In 1990 he raced in four different championships, but the highlight was winning the 250cc World Championship in his first full season on a Team Roberts Yamaha YZR250. After his loss at the 1991 American Grand Prix at Laguna Seca, Kocinski was so upset that he drove away from the track recklessly and refused to pull over when stopped by a policeman; he was arrested and sentenced to community service. He was a full-time 500cc racer for the next two years, finishing fourth and third in the championship and winning the final round in both seasons.

Kocinski started 1993 in 250s, taking Suzuki's first-ever podium at this level, but switched back to 500cc mid-season after falling out with the Suzuki team. He won Cagiva's first ever dry-weather 500cc win at Laguna Seca, and came 11th overall with only four appearances. He opened 1994 with a win in Australia and finished the season in third place. After Cagiva pulled out of Grand Prix racing, Kocinski concentrated on becoming a professional water skier.

=== Later years ===
Kocinski came back to world-level motorcycle racing in 1996 when he joined the World Superbike series on a factory Ducati and came close to winning the title in his first attempt, despite falling out with Ducati during the year. He joined the factory Castrol Honda squad for 1997, and won the title with nine wins and seven podium finishes. In the final round of the season at Sentul in Indonesia, Kocinski led teammate Aaron Slight going into the last lap of the first race. Slight needed to win the race to wrap up second in the championship and give Castrol Honda a 1–2 finish, and despite the Kiwi rider passing Kocinski early in the lap, the American re-passed Slight in a move that almost took out Slight's front wheel to take the win, meaning Slight only finished third in the championship. Kocinski's actions caused him to fall out with both the team and Slight.

Kocinski returned to the 500cc world championship in 1998 with Sito Pons' Movistar Honda team, and the following year in 1999 riding for Erv Kanemoto's sponsorless team but failed to win a race. He raced at home in AMA National championship in 2000 for Vance & Hines Ducati, and tested for Yamaha for the next two years before retiring. He is currently a property developer in Beverly Hills, California.

In January 2008, Kocinski was reported to have been looking for a professional motorcycle racing ride for 2008 in the AMA, SBK and 250cc sections.

== Grand Prix career statistics ==
Points system from 1988 to 1992:

| **Position** | 1 | 2 | 3 | 4 | 5 | 6 | 7 | 8 | 9 | 10 | 11 | 12 | 13 | 14 | 15 |
| **Points** | 20 | 17 | 15 | 13 | 11 | 10 | 9 | 8 | 7 | 6 | 5 | 4 | 3 | 2 | 1 |

Points system from 1993 onwards:

| **Position** | 1 | 2 | 3 | 4 | 5 | 6 | 7 | 8 | 9 | 10 | 11 | 12 | 13 | 14 | 15 |
| **Points** | 25 | 20 | 16 | 13 | 11 | 10 | 9 | 8 | 7 | 6 | 5 | 4 | 3 | 2 | 1 |

(key) (Races in bold indicate pole position; races in italics indicate fastest lap)

| Year | Class | Team | Machine | 1 | 2 | 3 | 4 | 5 | 6 | 7 | 8 | 9 | 10 | 11 | 12 | 13 | 14 | 15 | 16 | Points | Rank | Wins |
|---|---|---|---|---|---|---|---|---|---|---|---|---|---|---|---|---|---|---|---|---|---|---|
| 1988 | 250cc | Marlboro-Yamaha | TZ250 | JPN; 5 | **USA**; 4 | ESP - | EXP - | NAT; NC | GER; NC | AUT - | NED - | BEL - | YUG - | FRA - | GBR - | SWE - | CZE - | BRA - | | 24 | 19th | 0 |
| 1989 | 250cc | Marlboro-Yamaha | TZ250 | **JPN**; 1 | AUS - | **USA**; 1 | ESP - | NAT - | GER - | AUT - | YUG - | NED - | BEL - | FRA - | GBR - | SWE - | CZE - | BRA - | | 40 | 14th | 2 |
| 1989 | 500cc | Marlboro-Yamaha | YZR500 | JPN - | AUS - | USA - | ESP - | NAT - | GER - | AUT - | YUG - | NED - | BEL; 5 | FRA - | GBR - | SWE - | CZE - | BRA - | | 5.5 | 35th | 0 |
| 1990 | 250cc | Marlboro-Yamaha | YZR250 | **JPN**; 14 | USA; 1 | ESP; 1 | **NAT**; 1 | GER; 3 | AUT; 3 | **YUG**; 2 | NED; 1 | **BEL**; 1 | FRA; NC | **GBR**; NC | **SWE**; 2 | CZE; 2 | **HUN**; 1 | **AUS**; 1 | | 223 | **1st** | 7 |
| 1991 | 500cc | Marlboro-Yamaha | YZR500 | JPN; 4 | AUS; 3 | USA; NC | ESP; 2 | ITA; 2 | GER; NC | AUT; 9 | EUR; 5 | NED; 6 | FRA; NC | GBR; 4 | RSM; 6 | CZE; 3 | **VDM**; 4 | **MAL**; 1 | | 161 | 4th | 1 |
| 1992 | 500cc | Marlboro-Yamaha | YZR500 | JPN; NC | AUS; DNS | MAL - | ESP; 5 | ITA; 3 | EUR; 5 | GER; 5 | NED; 2 | HUN; 7 | FRA; 3 | GBR; NC | **BRA**; 2 | **RSA**; 1 | | | | 102 | **3rd** | 1 |
| 1993 | 250cc | Lucky Strike Suzuki | RGV250 | AUS; 2 | MAL; 5 | JPN; 9 | ESP; 4 | AUT; 7 | GER; 12 | NED; 3 | EUR - | RSM - | GBR - | CZE - | ITA - | USA - | FIM - | | | 80 | 12th | 0 |
| 1993 | 500cc | Cagiva | C593 | AUS - | MAL - | JPN - | ESP - | AUT - | GER - | NED - | EUR - | RSM - | GBR - | CZE; 4 | ITA; 4 | **USA**; 1 | FIM; NC | | | 51 | 11th | 1 |
| 1994 | 500cc | Cagiva | GP500 | **AUS**; 1 | **MAL**; 2 | JPN; 9 | ESP; 3 | AUT; 5 | GER; DNS | NED; 8 | ITA; NC | FRA; 2 | GBR; 4 | CZE; NC | USA; 2 | **ARG**; 3 | EUR; 3 | | | 172 | **3rd** | 1 |
| 1998 | 500cc | Pons Racing-Honda | NSR500 | JPN; 13 | MAL; 5 | ESP; 11 | ITA; 5 | FRA; 4 | MAD; DNF | NED - | GBR - | GER - | CZE; 15 | IMO; 13 | CAT; 9 | AUS; 12 | ARG; 10 | | | 64 | 12th | 0 |
| 1999 | 500cc | Kanemoto-Honda | NSR500 | **MAL**; NC | JPN; NC | ESP; 6 | FRA; 2 | ITA; 8 | CAT; 9 | NED; 7 | GBR; 9 | GER; 5 | CZE; 14 | IMO; 8 | VAL; 8 | AUS; 9 | RSA; 10 | BRA; 13 | ARG; 7 | 115 | 8th | 0 |

=== World Superbike Championship ===
| Pos | Rider | Bike | SMR (San Marino) | | GBR (United Kingdom) | | GER (Germany) | | ITA (Italy) | | CZE (Czech Republic) | | USA (United States) | | EUR (European Union) | | INA (Indonesia) | | JPN (Japan) | | NED (Netherlands) | | ESP (Spain) | | AUS (Australia) | | Pos | Pts | Ref |
| Pos | Rider | Bike | R1 | R2 | R1 | R2 | R1 | R2 | R1 | R2 | R1 | R2 | R1 | R2 | R1 | R2 | R1 | R2 | R1 | R2 | R1 | R2 | R1 | R2 | R1 | R2 | Pos | Pts | Ref |
|---|---|---|---|---|---|---|---|---|---|---|---|---|---|---|---|---|---|---|---|---|---|---|---|---|---|---|---|---|---|
| 1996 | SBK | Ducati | **1** | **1** | 7 | 6 | 2 | 3 | Ret | Ret | 4 | 6 | **1** | **12** | 3 | Ret | 1 | 1 | 5 | 2 | **5** | **3** | 3 | 2 | 7 | 5 | **3rd** | **337** | |

| Pos | Rider | Bike | AUS (Australia) | | SMR (San Marino) | | GBR (United Kingdom) | | GER (Germany) | | ITA (Italy) | | USA (United States) | | EUR (European Union) | | AUT (Austria) | | NED (Netherlands) | | ESP (Spain) | | JPN (Japan) | | INA (Indonesia) | | Pos | Pts | Ref |
| Pos | Rider | Bike | R1 | R2 | R1 | R2 | R1 | R2 | R1 | R2 | R1 | R2 | R1 | R2 | R1 | R2 | R1 | R2 | R1 | R2 | R1 | R2 | R1 | R2 | R1 | R2 | Pos | Pts | Ref |
|---|---|---|---|---|---|---|---|---|---|---|---|---|---|---|---|---|---|---|---|---|---|---|---|---|---|---|---|---|---|
| 1997 | SBK | Honda | 1 | 7 | 2 | 1 | 10 | 5 | 2 | 14 | 1 | 2 | 1 | 1 | 3 | 2 | 5 | 3 | **1** | **3** | **1** | **1** | 9 | 3 | **1** | **Ret** | **1st** | **416** | |
