= Lucio Pedercini =

Italian motorcycle racer

- Nationality: Italian
- Born: 22 September 1972 (age 54); Volta Mantovana, Italy
Motorcycle racing career statistics
Grand Prix motorcycle racing
Active years	1992–1997
Team(s)	Paton, ROC Yamaha
Championships	0
Starts / Wins / Podiums / Poles / F. laps / Points; 76 / 0 / 0 / 0 / 0 / 36
Superbike World Championship
Active years	1998–2006
Manufacturers	Ducati
Championships	0
2006 championship position	NC (0 pts)
Starts / Wins / Podiums / Poles / F. laps / Points; 176 / 0 / 0 / 0 / 0 / 250

Lucio Pedercini (born September 22, 1972) is an Italian former professional Grand Prix motorcycle racer and current motorcycle racing team owner.

== Career ==
Born in Volta Mantovana, Pedercini began racing in the Grand Prix world championships in 1992. He had his best season in 1996, when he finished in 17th place in the 500cc world championship final standings. Pedercini was Italian Superbike Champion in 2001 and 2002, riding a Ducati. He then competed in the World Superbike Championship from 1998 to 2006 with his best result being a ninth-place finish in the 2003 final standings.

== Racing team ownership ==
After he retired from riding motorcycles, Pedercini became a motorcycle racing team owner competing as Team Pedercini in the FIM Superstock 1000 Cup with riders Vittorio Iannuzzo and Ayrton Badovini. In 2014, the team competed in the World Superbike Championship with riders Alessandro Andreozzi and Luca Scassa. They also fielded a team in the FIM Superstock 1000 Cup consisting of Lorenzo Savadori, Balazs Nemeth, Romain Lanusse and Javier Alviz. In 2015, the team were chosen by Kawasaki to be their satellite team competing in the World Superbike Championship with Javier Alviz and David Salom riding Kawasaki Ninja ZX-10R motorcycles.

== Career statistics ==
=== Grand Prix motorcycle racing ===
==== Races by year ====
(key) (Races in bold indicate pole position) (Races in italics indicate fastest lap)

Year	Class	Bike	1	2	3	4	5	6	7	8	9	10	11	12	13	14	15	Pos	Pts
1992	500cc	Paton	JPN; DNQ	AUS; Ret	MAL	SPA; Ret	ITA; Ret	EUR; 22	GER; 23	NED; 20	HUN; Ret	FRA	GBR; Ret	BRA; Ret	RSA			NC	0
1993	500cc	ROC Yamaha	AUS; 18	MAL; 16	JPN; Ret	SPA; 12	AUT; Ret	GER; DNS	NED	EUR; Ret	RSM; 15	GBR; Ret	CZE; 20	ITA; 17	USA; Ret	FIM; 15		29th	6
1994	500cc	ROC Yamaha	AUS; Ret	MAL; 15	JPN; 18	SPA; Ret	AUT; Ret	GER; Ret	NED; Ret	ITA; 20	FRA; Ret	GBR; 18	CZE; Ret	USA; 15	ARG; 17	EUR; Ret		31st	2
1995	500cc	ROC Yamaha	AUS; 22	MAL; DNS	JPN; 22	SPA; Ret	GER; Ret	ITA; 20	NED; 21	FRA; Ret	GBR; Ret	CZE; Ret	BRA; 19	ARG; 19	EUR; 15			35th	1
1996	500cc	ROC Yamaha	MAL; 12	INA; Ret	JPN; DNS	SPA; 20	ITA; 13	FRA; 10	NED; Ret	GER; 13	GBR; 15	AUT; 16	CZE; 16	IMO; 13	CAT; Ret	BRA; 15	AUS; 12	17th	25
1997	500cc	ROC Yamaha	MAL; 16	JPN; Ret	SPA; 17	ITA; 15	AUT; 16	FRA; 19	NED; 18	IMO; 16	GER; Ret	BRA; 15	GBR; 16	CZE; Ret	CAT; 18	INA; 17	AUS; 17	29th	2

=== Superbike World Championship ===
==== Races by year ====
(key) (Races in bold indicate pole position) (Races in italics indicate fastest lap)

Year	Bike	1		2		3		4		5		6		7		8		9		10		11		12		13		Pos	Pts
Year	Bike	R1	R2	R1	R2	R1	R2	R1	R2	R1	R2	R1	R2	R1	R2	R1	R2	R1	R2	R1	R2	R1	R2	R1	R2	R1	R2	Pos	Pts
1998	Ducati	AUS; 13	AUS; Ret	GBR; 19	GBR; 20	ITA; 14	ITA; 14	SPA	SPA	GER; 12	GER; 14	SMR; 12	SMR; 14	RSA; Ret	RSA; 13	USA; 20	USA; 12	EUR	EUR	AUT; 16	AUT; Ret	NED; DNS	NED; DNS	JPN	JPN			21st	26
1999	Ducati	RSA; Ret	RSA; 12	AUS; Ret	AUS; 14	GBR; Ret	GBR; Ret	SPA; 15	SPA; 15	ITA; 13	ITA; Ret	GER; 11	GER; 13	SMR; 11	SMR; 14	USA; Ret	USA; Ret	EUR; Ret	EUR; Ret	AUT; 10	AUT; Ret	NED; 18	NED; 15	GER; 14	GER; Ret	JPN	JPN	20th	35
2000	Ducati	RSA	RSA	AUS; 4	AUS; 13	JPN; Ret	JPN; Ret	GBR; Ret	GBR; Ret	ITA; Ret	ITA; Ret	GER; Ret	GER; Ret	SMR; 13	SMR; 14	SPA; Ret	SPA; 16	USA; 13	USA; 15	GBR; Ret	GBR; 18	NED; 11	NED; 13	GER; Ret	GER; Ret	GBR; Ret	GBR; Ret	27th	33
2001	Ducati	SPA; 12	SPA; 15	RSA; 16	RSA; 14	AUS; Ret	AUS; C	JPN; 21	JPN; Ret	ITA; 7	ITA; 13	GBR; 18	GBR; Ret	GER; Ret	GER; Ret	SMR; Ret	SMR; Ret	USA; 16	USA; Ret	GBR; Ret	GBR; Ret	GER; Ret	GER; 16	NED; 15	NED; 15	ITA; 9	ITA; 12	19th	32
2002	Ducati	SPA; 14	SPA; 11	AUS; 10	AUS; Ret	RSA; Ret	RSA; 12	JPN; 16	JPN; 18	ITA; Ret	ITA; 6	GBR; Ret	GBR; Ret	GER; 10	GER; 10	SMR; 9	SMR; 9	USA; 17	USA; 16	GBR; Ret	GBR; Ret	GER; 13	GER; 12	NED; Ret	NED; 10	ITA; 14	ITA; 13	13th	71
2003	Ducati	SPA; 8	SPA; 9	AUS; 10	AUS; 14	JPN; 7	JPN; Ret	ITA; 10	ITA; 10	GER; 9	GER; 10	GBR; 11	GBR; 11	SMR; 8	SMR; 6	USA; Ret	USA; 10	GBR; Ret	GBR; 16	NED; 12	NED; 14	ITA; Ret	ITA; 6	FRA; Ret	FRA; 11			9th	112
2004	Ducati	SPA; Ret	SPA; 13	AUS; Ret	AUS; Ret	SMR; Ret	SMR; 8	ITA; Ret	ITA; 12	GER; Ret	GER; Ret	GBR; Ret	GBR; 15	USA; 12	USA; 11	GBR; 13	GBR; Ret	NED; Ret	NED; DNS	ITA; Ret	ITA; 7	FRA; 12	FRA; DNS					16th	41
2005	Ducati	QAT; Ret	QAT; Ret	AUS; Ret	AUS; Ret	SPA; Ret	SPA; Ret	ITA; DNS	ITA; DNS	EUR	EUR	SMR; Ret	SMR; Ret	CZE; WD	CZE; WD	GBR; WD	GBR; WD	NED; Ret	NED; Ret	GER; Ret	GER; Ret	ITA; Ret	ITA; C	FRA; DNQ	FRA; DNQ			NC	0
2006	Ducati	QAT; 20	QAT; Ret	AUS; Ret	AUS; Ret	SPA; DNS	SPA; DNS	ITA	ITA	EUR	EUR	SMR	SMR	CZE	CZE	GBR	GBR	NED	NED	GER	GER	ITA	ITA	FRA	FRA			NC	0

=== CIV Superbike Championship ===
==== Races by year ====
(key) (Races in bold indicate pole position; races in italics indicate fastest lap)

Year	Bike	1	2	3	4	5	Pos	Pts
2001	Ducati	MIS1; 1	MON; 1	**VAL**; 1	**MIS2**; 1	MIS3	1st	100
2002	Ducati	**IMO**; 1	**VAL**; 1	**MUG**; 1	**MIS1**; 3	MIS2; 1	1st	100 (116)
