= Tetsuya Harada =

Japanese motorcycle racer

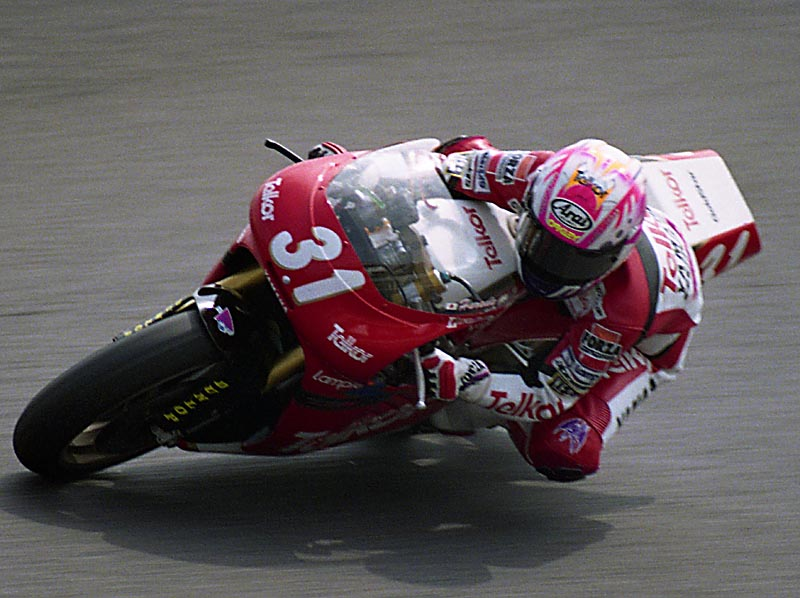
- Tetsuya Harada on the Yamaha TZ250 (1993)
- Nationality: Japanese
- Born: 14 June 1970 (age 56); Chiba, Japan
Motorcycle racing career statistics
Grand Prix motorcycle racing
Active years	1990 - 2002
First race	1990 250cc Japanese Grand Prix
Last race	2002 500cc Valencia Grand Prix
First win	1993 250cc Australian Grand Prix
Last win	2001 250cc Pacific Grand Prix
Team(s)	Yamaha, Aprilia
Championships	250cc - 1993
Starts / Wins / Podiums / Poles / F. laps / Points; 145 / 17 / 55 / 21 / 21 / 1546

Tetsuya Harada (原田哲也, Harada Tetsuya; born June 14, 1970) is a Japanese former Grand Prix motorcycle road racer. He was the 1993 FIM 250cc World Champion.

== Early years ==
Born in Chiba, Japan, Harada won the Japanese 125cc Junior championship in 1988, and was runner-up to Tadayuki Okada in the All-Japan 250cc series in both 1990 and 1991, before taking the crown in 1992. In all three years, he competed in the Japanese round of the 250cc World Championship, twice starting on the front row and twice scoring points. His performance earned him a sponsored ride in the 1993 250cc World Championship.

== 250 career ==
Riding a Yamaha TZ250, Harada won four races including his home race and won the 1993 250cc World Championship in his first attempt defeating Honda's Loris Capirossi. A wrist injury affected his performance in the 1994 season, finishing seventh overall with only a single podium finish. In 1995, Harada was Max Biaggi's main competitor for the 250 title. He won one race and finished second eight times. In 1996, his bike was underpowered and he only reached the podium four times. He was on the verge of retiring when Aprilia offered him a bike for the 1997 season. Although his 235 points were the most he scored in a season, he finished the season in third place behind Biaggi and Ralf Waldmann.

In 1998, Harada battled his Aprilia teammate Capirossi for the championship, leading for most of the season, until the two riders were involved in a controversial incident at the final race of the year in Argentina. Harada had the world championship within sight, leading the race into the final corner of the final lap when Harada's bike was rammed from behind by Capirossi's machine, sending the Japanese rider off the track. Valentino Rossi took the victory while Capirossi claimed second place and the world championship. Harada would finish the season in third place behind Capirossi and Rossi.

== 500 career ==
In 1999, Harada moved up to the 500cc class to compete on Aprilia's 380cc V-twin race bike. He obtained top-five finishes in the first ten races, including podium results at Paul Ricard and Donington Park. However, the bike's performance subsequently faded and he could not improve his results. In 2000, he was less competitive, coming 16th overall. In 2001, he made another attempt to obtain a second 250cc world championship, taking 8 poles and three victories: the title, however, went to fellow Japanese Daijiro Kato. For 2002, he entered the MotoGP class aboard a Honda two-stroke, but this proved to be his final year of professional racing, as he retired after a difficult season that saw him finish 17th overall. He ended his career with 17 Grand Prix victories, all in the 250cc class.

== Grand Prix career statistics ==
Points system from 1988 to 1992:

**Position**	1	2	3	4	5	6	7	8	9	10	11	12	13	14	15
**Points**	20	17	15	13	11	10	9	8	7	6	5	4	3	2	1

Points system from 1993:

**Position**	1	2	3	4	5	6	7	8	9	10	11	12	13	14	15
**Points**	25	20	16	13	11	10	9	8	7	6	5	4	3	2	1

(key) (Races in bold indicate pole position; races in italics indicate fastest lap)

Year	Class	Team	Machine	1	2	3	4	5	6	7	8	9	10	11	12	13	14	15	16	Points	Rank	Wins
1990	250cc	Yamaha	TZ250	JPN; 7	USA -	ESP -	NAT -	GER -	AUT -	YUG -	NED -	BEL -	FRA -	GBR -	SWE -	CZE -	HUN -	AUS -		9	27th	0
1991	250cc	Nescafé Can RT Yamaha	TZ250	JPN; 6	AUS -	USA -	ESP -	ITA -	GER -	AUT -	EUR -	NED -	FRA -	GBR -	RSM -	CZE -	VDM -	MAL -		10	24th	0
1992	250cc	Nescafé Can RT Yamaha	TZ250	JPN; NC	AUS -	MAL -	ESP -	ITA -	EUR -	GER -	NED -	HUN -	FRA -	GBR -	BRA -	RSA -				0	-	0
1993	250cc	Telcor Yamaha Valesi	TZ250	AUS; 1	MAL; 2	**JPN**; 1	**ESP**; 1	AUT; 6	GER; 6	NED; 2	EUR; NC	RSM; 3	GBR; DNF	CZE; 6	ITA; DNF	USA; 5	FIM; 1			197	1st	4
1994	250cc	Yamaha of France	TZ250	AUS; DNS	MAL -	JPN; 9	ESP; 7	AUT; NC	GER; 7	NED; NC	ITA; 2	FRA; 8	GBR; 4	CZE; NC	USA; 3	ARG; 3	EUR; 5			109	7th	0
1995	250cc	Marlboro Yamaha	TZ250	AUS; 2	MAL; 2	**JPN**; 4	**ESP**; 1	GER; 2	ITA; 2	NED; DNS	FRA; 5	GBR; 2	CZE; 2	BRA; 5	ARG; 2	**EUR**; 2				220	2nd	1
1996	250cc	Marlboro Yamaha	TZ250	MAL; 2	**INA**; 1	**JPN**; NC	ESP; 2	ITA; 6	FRA; 3	NED; 10	GER; NC	GBR; DNS	AUT; NC	CZE; 9	IMO; NC	CAT -	BRA -	AUS -		104	8th	1
1997	250cc	Aprilia	RS250	MAL; 2	**JPN**; 3	ESP; 2	ITA; NC	AUT; 18	FRA; 1	NED; 1	IMO; 5	GER; 1	BRA; 2	GBR; 2	CZE; 3	CAT; 4	INA; 4	AUS; 5		235	3rd	3
1998	250cc	Aprilia	RS250	JPN; 4	MAL; 1	ESP; NC	**ITA**; 3	**FRA**; 1	MAD; 1	NED; DNF	GBR; 2	**GER**; 1	CZE; 1	**IMO**; 10	CAT; 2	AUS; DNF	ARG; NC			200	3rd	5
1999	500cc	Aprilia	RSW500	MAL; 13	JPN; NC	ESP; NC	FRA; 3	**ITA**; 4	CAT; 4	NED; 11	GBR; 3	GER; 7	CZE; 5	IMO; 13	VAL; 11	AUS; NC	RSA; 15	BRA; 12	ARG; 11	104	10th	0
2000	500cc	Aprilia	RSW500	RSA; NC	MAL; 12	JPN; NC	ESP; 11	FRA; 10	ITA; NC	CAT; 9	NED; 12	GBR; NC	GER; NC	CZE; 14	POR; 14	VAL; NC	BRA; 13	PAC; 13	AUS; 14	38	16th	0
2001	250cc	Aprilia	RS250	JPN; 2	RSA; 3	ESP; 2	FRA; 2	**ITA**; 1	CAT; 2	**NED**; 24	**GBR**; 18	**GER**; 3	**CZE**; 1	**POR**; 3	VAL; 2	**PAC**; 1	**AUS**; 2	MAL; 2	BRA; 6	273	2nd	3
2002	MotoGP	Pramac-Honda	NSR500	JPN; 11	RSA; 12	ESP; 10	FRA; NC	ITA; 10	CAT; 13	NED; 13	GBR; 11	GER; NC	CZE; 15	POR; 10	BRA; 13	PAC; 15	MAL; NC	AUS; 14	VAL; 14	47	17th	0
