= 1994 Australian motorcycle Grand Prix =

(Australia) 1994 Australian Grand Prix
Race details
- Race 1 of 14 races in the 1994 Grand Prix motorcycle racing season
- Date: 27 March 1994
- Official name: Foster's Australian Motorcycle Grand Prix
- Location: Eastern Creek Raceway
- Course: Permanent racing facility; 3.930 km (2.442 mi)

MotoGP
Pole position
- Rider: (United States) John Kocinski
- Time: 1:30.394
Fastest lap
- Rider: (Italy) Luca Cadalora
- Time: 1:31.615
Podium
- First: (United States) John Kocinski
- Second: (Italy) Luca Cadalora
- Third: (Australia) Mick Doohan

250cc
Pole position
- Rider: (Italy) Loris Capirossi
- Time: 1:32.200
Fastest lap
- Rider: (Italy) Max Biaggi
- Time: 1:32.658
Podium
- First: (Italy) Max Biaggi
- Second: (Italy) Doriano Romboni
- Third: (Italy) Loris Capirossi

125cc
Pole position
- Rider: (Japan) Kazuto Sakata
- Time: 1:37.528
Fastest lap
- Rider: (Japan) Kazuto Sakata
- Time: 1:37.908
Podium
- First: (Japan) Kazuto Sakata
- Second: (Germany) Peter Öttl
- Third: (Australia) Garry McCoy

The 1994 Australian motorcycle Grand Prix was the first round of the 1994 Grand Prix motorcycle racing season. It took place on 27 March 1994 at Eastern Creek Raceway.

== 500 cc classification ==
Race was scheduled for 30 laps however spectators stormed the track shortly after the chequered flag when some riders haven't completed the full distance yet. Because of these circumstances the official results were taken at the end of the penultimate lap.

Pos.	Rider	Team	Manufacturer	Laps	Time/Retired	Points
1	(United States) John Kocinski	Cagiva Team Agostini	Cagiva	29	44:37.026	25
2	(Italy) Luca Cadalora	Marlboro Team Roberts	Yamaha	29	+6.480	20
3	(Australia) Mick Doohan	Honda Team HRC	Honda	29	+8.246	16
4	(United States) Kevin Schwantz	Lucky Strike Suzuki	Suzuki	29	+26.854	13
5	(Japan) Shinichi Itoh	Honda Team HRC	Honda	29	+30.829	11
6	(Spain) Àlex Crivillé	Honda Team HRC	Honda	29	+33.455	10
7	(Spain) Alberto Puig	Ducados Honda Pons	Honda	29	+33.730	9
8	(Brazil) Alex Barros	Lucky Strike Suzuki	Suzuki	29	+33.736	8
9	(United States) Doug Chandler	Cagiva Team Agostini	Cagiva	29	+45.804	7
10	(United Kingdom) John Reynolds	'Padgett's Motorcycles	Harris Yamaha	29	+1:22.062	6
11	(France) Bernard Garcia	Yamaha Motor France	ROC Yamaha	29	+1:27.745	5
12	(Australia) Scott Doohan	Shell Harris Grand Prix	Harris Yamaha	29	+1:32.542	4
13	(Spain) Juan López Mella	Lopez Mella Racing Team	ROC Yamaha	29	+1:32.788	3
14	(United Kingdom) Sean Emmett	Shell Harris Grand Prix	Harris Yamaha	29	+1:33.338	2
15	(Italy) Cristiano Migliorati	Team Pedercini	ROC Yamaha	28	+1 Lap	1
16	(Belgium) Laurent Naveau	Euro Team	ROC Yamaha	28	+1 Lap	
17	(United Kingdom) Jeremy McWilliams	Millar Racing	Yamaha	28	+1 Lap	
18	(France) Jean Pierre Jeandat	JPJ Racing	ROC Yamaha	28	+1 Lap	
19	(Switzerland) Bernard Haenggeli	Haenggeli Racing	ROC Yamaha	28	+1 Lap	
20	(France) Marc Garcia	DR Team Shark	ROC Yamaha	28	+1 Lap	
21	(Spain) Julián Miralles	Team ROC	ROC Yamaha	28	+1 Lap	
22	(France) Bruno Bonhuil	MTD Objectif 500	ROC Yamaha	28	+1 Lap	
23	(Luxembourg) Andreas Leuthe	Team Doppler Austria	ROC Yamaha	28	+1 Lap	
24	(Italy) Vittorio Scatola	Team Paton	Paton	27	+2 Laps	
25	(Netherlands) Cees Doorakkers	Team Doorakkers	Harris Yamaha	27	+2 Laps	
Ret	(Italy) Lucio Pedercini	Team Pedercini	ROC Yamaha	15	Retirement	
Ret	(France) Jean Foray	Jean Foray Racing Team	ROC Yamaha	8	Retirement	
Ret	(Australia) Daryl Beattie	Marlboro Team Roberts	Yamaha	6	Engine	
Ret	(Italy) Marco Papa	Team Elit	ROC Yamaha	6	Retirement	
Ret	(United Kingdom) Kevin Mitchell	MBM Racing	Harris Yamaha	5	Retirement	
Ret	(United Kingdom) Niall Mackenzie	Slick 50 Team WCM	ROC Yamaha	2	Retirement	
DNQ	(Germany) Lothar Neukirchner	Sachsen Racing	Harris Yamaha		Did not qualify	

== 250 cc classification ==
Pos	Rider	Manufacturer	Laps	Time/Retired	Points
1	(Italy) Max Biaggi	Aprilia	28	43:42.148	25
2	(Italy) Doriano Romboni	Honda	28	+0.658	20
3	(Italy) Loris Capirossi	Honda	28	+0.696	16
4	(France) Jean Philippe Ruggia	Aprilia	28	+4.380	13
5	(Japan) Tadayuki Okada	Honda	28	+22.590	11
6	(Japan) Nobuatsu Aoki	Honda	28	+22.663	10
7	(Germany) Ralf Waldmann	Honda	28	+31.969	9
8	(Spain) Luis D'Antin	Honda	28	+45.944	8
9	(Netherlands) Wilco Zeelenberg	Honda	28	+45.976	7
10	(France) Jean-Michel Bayle	Aprilia	28	+47.386	6
11	(Australia) Craig Connell	Honda	28	+56.921	5
12	(Austria) Andreas Preining	Aprilia	28	+57.320	4
13	(Switzerland) Adrien Bosshard	Honda	28	+57.469	3
14	(Spain) Carlos Checa	Honda	28	+1:12.094	2
15	(Switzerland) Eskil Suter	Aprilia	28	+1:12.236	1
16	(Netherlands) Jurgen vd Goorbergh	Aprilia	28	+1:16.288	
17	(Italy) Alessandro Gramigni	Aprilia	28	+1:31.394	
18	(France) Frederic Protat	Honda	27	+1 Lap	
19	(Spain) José Luis Cardoso	Aprilia	27	+1 Lap	
20	(France) Christian Boudinot	Aprilia	27	+1 Lap	
21	(Spain) Luis Carlos Maurel	Honda	27	+1 Lap	
22	(Spain) Juan Borja	Aprilia	27	+1 Lap	
23	(Australia) René Bongers	Honda	27	+1 Lap	
24	(United Kingdom) Alan Patterson	Honda	26	+2 Laps	
25	(Finland) Krisse Kaas	Yamaha	26	+2 Laps	
Ret	(Germany) Bernd Kassner	Aprilia	27	Retirement	
Ret	(Netherlands) Patrick vd Goorbergh	Aprilia	17	Retirement	
Ret	(Spain) Enrique de Juan	Aprilia	15	Retirement	
Ret	(Canada) Rodney Fee	Honda	13	Retirement	
Ret	(France) Noel Ferro	Honda	10	Retirement	
Ret	(Germany) Adolf Stadler	Aprilia	7	Retirement	
DNS	(Japan) Tetsuya Harada	Yamaha		Did not start	

- Tetsuya Harada suffered a broken hand in a crash during first practice session and withdrew from the event.

== 125 cc classification ==
Pos	Rider	Manufacturer	Laps	Time/Retired	Points
1	(Japan) Kazuto Sakata	Aprilia	26	43:05.474	25
2	(Germany) Peter Öttl	Aprilia	26	+5.199	20
3	(Australia) Garry McCoy	Aprilia	26	+11.537	16
4	(Italy) Fausto Gresini	Honda	26	+15.540	13
5	(Switzerland) Olivier Petrucciani	Aprilia	26	+24.593	11
6	(Japan) Akira Saito	Honda	26	+27.472	10
7	(Japan) Noboru Ueda	Honda	26	+27.957	9
8	(Spain) Herri Torrontegui	Aprilia	26	+27.993	8
9	(Japan) Masaki Tokudome	Honda	26	+28.436	7
10	(Germany) Dirk Raudies	Honda	26	+36.223	6
11	(Netherlands) Loek Bodelier	Honda	26	+36.344	5
12	(Italy) Gianluigi Scalvini	Aprilia	26	+36.348	4
13	(Italy) Gabriele Debbia	Aprilia	26	+47.472	3
14	(Japan) Tomoko Igata	Honda	26	+48.274	2
15	(Japan) Hideyuki Nakajo	Honda	26	+48.496	1
16	(Italy) Bruno Casanova	Honda	26	+51.976	
17	(Japan) Haruchika Aoki	Honda	26	+52.029	
18	(Italy) Lucio Cecchinello	Honda	26	+1:01.315	
19	(Germany) Stefan Prein	Yamaha	26	+1:02.934	
20	(Germany) Manfred Geissler	Aprilia	26	+1:02.942	
21	(Italy) Giuseppe Fiorillo	Honda	26	+1:03.286	
22	(France) Frederic Petit	Yamaha	26	+1:24.084	
23	(Germany) Oliver Koch	Honda	26	+1:24.668	
24	(Netherlands) Hans Spaan	Honda	26	+1:25.920	
25	(Australia) Glen Richards	Aprilia	26	+1:34.830	
26	(Spain) Carlos Giro	Aprilia	26	+1:44.800	
27	(Japan) Masafumo Ono	Honda	25	+1 Lap	
28	(Italy) Vittorio Lopez	Honda	25	+1 Lap	
Ret	(Austria) Manfred Baumann	Yamaha	18	Retirement	
Ret	(Italy) Stefano Perugini	Aprilia	14	Retirement	
Ret	(Japan) Takeshi Tsujimura	Honda	13	Accident	
Ret	(Australia) Ken Fisher	Honda	7	Retirement	
Ret	(Spain) Jorge Martinez	Yamaha	5	Retirement	
Ret	(United Kingdom) Neil Hodgson	Honda	4	Retirement	
Ret	(Italy) Daniela Tognoli	Aprilia	4	Retirement	
Ret	(Japan) Yoshiaki Katoh	Yamaha	1	Accident	

Previous race: 1993 FIM Grand Prix	FIM Grand Prix World Championship; 1994 season	Next race: 1994 Malaysian Grand Prix
Previous race: 1993 Australian Grand Prix	Australian motorcycle Grand Prix	Next race: 1995 Australian Grand Prix
