= Dirk Raudies =

German motorcycle racer (born 1964)

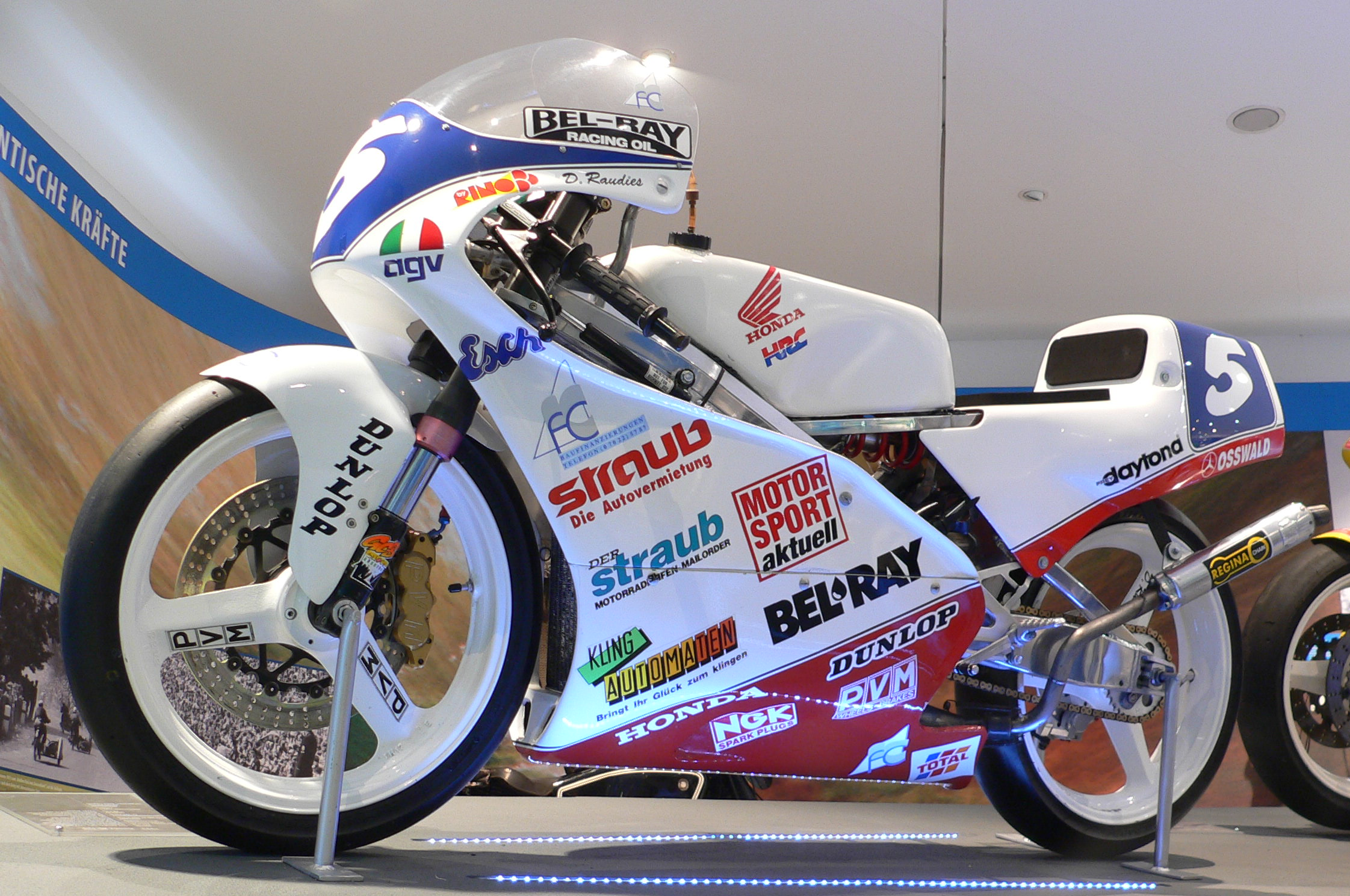
- Dirk Raudies' 1993 Championship-winning Honda RS125R
- Nationality: German
Motorcycle racing career statistics
Grand Prix motorcycle racing
Active years	1989 - 1997
First race	1989 125cc Japanese Grand Prix
Last race	1997 125cc Australian Grand Prix
First win	1992 125cc Brazilian Grand Prix
Last win	1995 125cc Dutch TT
Team	Honda
Championships	1993 - 125cc
Starts / Wins / Podiums / Poles / F. laps / Points; 117 / 14 / 23 / 8 / 9 / 969.5

Dirk Raudies (born June 17, 1964) is a German former professional motorcycle racer and current television sports presenter. He competed in Grand Prix motorcycle racing from 1989 to 1997.

Born in Biberach an der Riß, Germany, Raudies specialised in 125cc class racing where, he experienced his greatest success in 1993 when he won the 125cc Grand Prix world championship on a Honda RS125R.

Since 2004, Raudies has been a television motorsport commentator at Eurosport. From 2004 to 2008, he commentated alongside Ron Ringguth for MotoGP and since 2009 for Superbike World Championship as well as the Supersport World Championship alongside Lenz Leberkern, who also used to be the pit road commentator back when him and Ringguth were broadcasting MotoGP. During those broadcasts he serves rather as a side commentator than an analyst, considering he never raced superbikes.

Raudies is married to Birgit and has three children.

== Grand Prix career statistics ==
Points system from 1988 to 1992:

**Position**	1	2	3	4	5	6	7	8	9	10	11	12	13	14	15
**Points**	20	17	15	13	11	10	9	8	7	6	5	4	3	2	1

Points system from 1993 onwards:

**Position**	1	2	3	4	5	6	7	8	9	10	11	12	13	14	15
**Points**	25	20	16	13	11	10	9	8	7	6	5	4	3	2	1

(key) (Races in bold indicate pole position; races in italics indicate fastest lap)

Year	Class	Team	1	2	3	4	5	6	7	8	9	10	11	12	13	14	15	Points	Rank	Wins
1989	125cc	Honda	JPN -	AUS -	ESP -	NAT -	GER; 12	AUT; 6	NED; 15	BEL; 13	FRA -	GBR; 13	SWE; 11	CZE; 13				29	15	0
1990	125cc	Honda	JPN; 4	USA -	ESP; 10	NAT; 2	GER; 2	AUT; NC	YUG; 13	NED; 11	BEL; 6	FRA; 8	GBR; 13	SWE; 8	CZE; 6	HUN; 13	AUS; 6	113	5th	0
1991	125cc	Honda	JPN; 21	AUS; 11	USA -	ESP; 9	ITA; 10	GER; 8	AUT; 4	EUR; 5	NED; 10	FRA; 6	GBR; NC	RSM; 9	CZE; NC	VDM -	MAL; 8	81	8th	0
1992	125cc	Honda	JPN; 9	AUS; 7	MAL; 5	ESP; 7	ITA; 2	EUR; 5	GER; 6	NED -	HUN; 15	FRA; 7	GBR; 4	BRA; 1	RSA; 4			91	6th	1
1993	125cc	Honda	AUS; 1	**MAL**; 1	**JPN**; 1	**ESP**; NC	AUT; 3	**GER**; 1	**NED**; 1	EUR; 5	RSM; 1	GBR; 1	CZE; 2	ITA; 1	USA; 1	**FIM**; 8		280	**1st**	9
1994	125cc	Honda	AUS; 10	MAL; 4	JPN; NC	ESP; 5	AUT; 1	GER; 1	NED; NC	ITA; 5	FRA; 5	GBR; 8	CZE; 7	USA; 8	ARG; 6	**EUR**; 1		162	4th	3
1995	125cc	Honda	**AUS**; NC	MAL; 7	JPN; NC	ESP; 3	GER; 5	ITA; NC	NED; 1	FRA; 2	GBR; 4	CZE; NC	BRA; 8	ARG; 3	EUR; 5			124.5	5th	1
1996	125cc	Honda	MAL; NC	INA; 4	JPN; NC	ESP; 13	ITA; NC	FRA; 6	NED; 6	GER; 16	GBR; NC	AUT; 2	CZE; 10	IMO; 14	CAT; 10	BRA; 10	AUS; 11	81	13th	0
1997	125cc	Honda	MAL; 14	JPN; NC	ESP; 20	ITA; 20	AUT; NC	FRA; 10	NED; NC	IMO; 17	GER; NC	BRA; 20	GBR; NC	CZE; 19	CAT; 17	INA; NC	AUS; NC	8	25th	0
