= 1993 San Marino motorcycle Grand Prix =

1993 San Marino Grand Prix
Race details
- Race 9 of 14 races in the 1993 Grand Prix motorcycle racing season
- Date: 18 July 1993
- Official name: Gran Premio di San Marino
- Location: Autodromo Internazionale del Mugello
- Course: Permanent racing facility; 5.245 km (3.259 mi)

500cc
Pole position
- Rider: (Australia) Mick Doohan
- Time: 1:53.650
Fastest lap
- Rider: (Australia) Mick Doohan
- Time: 1:53.829
Podium
- First: (Australia) Mick Doohan
- Second: (United States) Kevin Schwantz
- Third: (United States) Wayne Rainey

250cc
Pole position
- Rider: (Italy) Loris Reggiani
- Time: 1:56.283
Fastest lap
- Rider: (France) Jean-Philippe Ruggia
- Time: 1:56.224
Podium
- First: (Italy) Loris Capirossi
- Second: (Italy) Loris Reggiani
- Third: (Japan) Tetsuya Harada

125cc
Pole position
- Rider: (Japan) Kazuto Sakata
- Time: 2:02.584
Fastest lap
- Rider: (Spain) Carlos Giró
- Time: 2:03.309
Podium
- First: (Germany) Dirk Raudies
- Second: (Japan) Kazuto Sakata
- Third: (Japan) Akira Saito

The 1993 San Marino motorcycle Grand Prix was the ninth round of the 1993 Grand Prix motorcycle racing season. It took place on 18 July 1993, at the Mugello Circuit.

== 500 cc race report ==
Doug Chandler crashes in qualifying and briefly loses consciousness, which automatically DQd him from the race.

Mick Doohan’s 3rd pole in a row. Doohan takes the start from Wayne Rainey and Kevin Schwantz.

Down the straight, Rainey is extending his leg as if he has a problem.

The lead is a 2-man battle, and Doohan almost highsides on the turn leading to the straight and lets Schwantz through for the lead. They swap the front many times, but Schwantz develops a tire problem and nurses it home to 2nd. In the battle with Schwantz, Doohan demonstrates that any lingering weakness from Assen '92 isn't enough to prevent him from riding at the highest level.

== 500 cc classification ==
Pos.	Rider	Team	Manufacturer	Time/Retired	Points
1	(Australia) Mick Doohan	Rothmans Honda Team	Honda	44:02.712	25
2	(United States) Kevin Schwantz	Lucky Strike Suzuki	Suzuki	+9.953	20
3	(United States) Wayne Rainey	Marlboro Team Roberts	Yamaha	+31.701	16
4	(Japan) Shinichi Itoh	HRC Rothmans Honda	Honda	+35.893	13
5	(Italy) Luca Cadalora	Marlboro Team Roberts	Yamaha	+46.598	11
6	(Australia) Daryl Beattie	Rothmans Honda Team	Honda	+57.000	10
7	(Brazil) Alex Barros	Lucky Strike Suzuki	Suzuki	+1:18.568	9
8	(United Kingdom) Niall Mackenzie	Valvoline Team WCM	ROC Yamaha	+1:27.893	8
9	(Australia) Matthew Mladin	Cagiva Team Agostini	Cagiva	+1:35.630	7
10	(France) José Kuhn	Euromoto	Yamaha	+1:43.928	6
11	(France) Bernard Garcia	Yamaha Motor France	Yamaha	+1:52.258	5
12	(Italy) Renato Colleoni	Team Elit	ROC Yamaha	+2:01.138	4
13	(United Kingdom) Jeremy McWilliams	Millar Racing	Yamaha	+1 Lap	3
14	(Switzerland) Serge David	Team ROC	ROC Yamaha	+1 Lap	2
15	(Italy) Lucio Pedercini	Team Pedercini	ROC Yamaha	+1 Lap	1
16	(New Zealand) Andrew Stroud	Team Harris	Harris Yamaha	+1 Lap	
17	(United Kingdom) David Jefferies	Peter Graves Racing Team	Harris Yamaha	+1 Lap	
Ret	(Germany) Michael Rudroff	Rallye Sport	Harris Yamaha	Retirement	
Ret	(Japan) Tsutomu Udagawa	Team Udagawa	ROC Yamaha	Retirement	
Ret	(United Kingdom) Kevin Mitchell	MBM Racing	Harris Yamaha	Retirement	
Ret	(France) Bruno Bonhuil	MTD Objectif 500	ROC Yamaha	Retirement	
Ret	(United Kingdom) John Reynolds	Padgett's Motorcycles	Harris Yamaha	Retirement	
Ret	(Netherlands) Cees Doorakkers	Doorakkers Racing	Harris Yamaha	Retirement	
Ret	(Austria) Andreas Meklau	Austrian Racing Company	ROC Yamaha	Retirement	
Ret	(Spain) Juan Lopez Mella	Lopez Mella Racing Team	ROC Yamaha	Retirement	
Ret	(Belgium) Laurent Naveau	Euro Team	ROC Yamaha	Retirement	
Ret	(Spain) Àlex Crivillé	Marlboro Honda Pons	Honda	Retirement	
Ret	(United Kingdom) Sean Emmett	Shell Team Harris	Harris Yamaha	Retirement	
Ret	(Italy) Marco Papa	Librenti Corse	ROC Yamaha	Retirement	
DNS	(France) Thierry Crine	Ville de Paris	ROC Yamaha	Did not start	
DNS	(United States) Doug Chandler	Cagiva Team Agostini	Cagiva	Did not start	

== 250 cc classification ==
Pos	Rider	Manufacturer	Time/Retired	Points
1	(Italy) Loris Capirossi	Honda	41:5.271	25
2	(Italy) Loris Reggiani	Aprilia	+0.118	20
3	(Japan) Tetsuya Harada	Yamaha	+4.837	16
4	(France) Jean-Philippe Ruggia	Aprilia	+4.859	13
5	(Italy) Max Biaggi	Honda	+14.364	11
6	(Japan) Tadayuki Okada	Honda	+14.376	10
7	(Germany) Helmut Bradl	Honda	+14.668	9
8	(Italy) Pierfrancesco Chili	Yamaha	+22.395	8
9	(Japan) Nobuatsu Aoki	Honda	+22.931	7
10	(Spain) Alberto Puig	Honda	+23.029	6
11	(Italy) Marcellino Lucchi	Aprilia	+38.466	5
12	(Switzerland) Eskil Suter	Aprilia	+48.253	4
13	(New Zealand) Simon Crafar	Suzuki	+48.491	3
14	(Italy) Alessandro Gramigni	Gilera	+48.822	2
15	(Germany) Jochen Schmid	Yamaha	+52.761	1
16	(France) Frédéric Protat	Aprilia	+1:03.129	
17	(Netherlands) Patrick van den Goorbergh	Aprilia	+1:03.324	
18	(France) Jean-Michel Bayle	Aprilia	+1:03.93	
19	(Switzerland) Adrian Bosshard	Honda	+1:03.719	
20	(Germany) Bernd Kassner	Aprilia	+1:35.819	
21	(Spain) Carlos Checa	Honda	+1:35.835	
22	(Germany) Volker Bahr	Honda	+1:55.548	
23	(Austria) Andy Preining	Aprilia	+2:01.119	
24	(Italy) Massimo Pennacchioli	Honda	+1 Lap	
25	(San Marino) Claudio Tonnini	Honda	+1 Lap	
Ret	(Switzerland) Bernard Haenggeli	Aprilia	Retirement	
Ret	(Netherlands) Jurgen van den Goorbergh	Aprilia	Retirement	
Ret	(Spain) Luis Carlos Maurel	Aprilia	Retirement	
Ret	(Spain) Jorge Martínez	Honda	Retirement	
Ret	(Netherlands) Wilco Zeelenberg	Aprilia	Retirement	
Ret	(France) Jean-Pierre Jeandat	Aprilia	Retirement	

Previous race: 1993 European Grand Prix	FIM Grand Prix World Championship; 1993 season	Next race: 1993 British Grand Prix
Previous race: 1991 San Marino Grand Prix	San Marino Grand Prix	Next race: 2007 San Marino Grand Prix
