= 1993 Japanese motorcycle Grand Prix =

(Japan) 1993 Japanese Grand Prix
Race details
- Race 3 of 14 races in the 1993 Grand Prix motorcycle racing season
- Date: 18 April 1993
- Official name: Marlboro GP
- Location: Suzuka Circuit
- Course: Permanent racing facility; 5.821 km (3.617 mi)

500cc
Pole position
- Rider: (United States) Kevin Schwantz
- Time: 2:09.239
Fastest lap
- Rider: (United States) Kevin Schwantz
- Time: 2:09.891
Podium
- First: (United States) Wayne Rainey
- Second: (United States) Kevin Schwantz
- Third: (Australia) Daryl Beattie

250cc
Pole position
- Rider: (Japan) Tetsuya Harada
- Time: 2:11.089
Fastest lap
- Rider: (Italy) Loris Capirossi
- Time: 2:12.281
Podium
- First: (Japan) Tetsuya Harada
- Second: (Japan) Tadayuki Okada
- Third: (Italy) Doriano Romboni

125cc
Pole position
- Rider: (Germany) Dirk Raudies
- Time: 2:20.046
Fastest lap
- Rider: (Japan) Kazuto Sakata
- Time: 2:20.231
Podium
- First: (Germany) Dirk Raudies
- Second: (Japan) Kazuto Sakata
- Third: (Japan) Takeshi Tsujimura

The 1993 Japanese motorcycle Grand Prix was the third round of the 1993 Grand Prix motorcycle racing season. It took place on 18 April 1993, at the Suzuka Circuit.

== 500 cc race report ==
This race was most notable for the three-way battle for the win between Wayne Rainey, Kevin Schwantz and Daryl Beattie, Rainey's fightback after a bad start for the win and Schwantz' last lap recovery drive from fourth to almost win the race.

After three rounds, last year's world champion Wayne Rainey leads the title hunt with 45 points. Kevin Schwantz is a close second with 41 points.

On Saturday, Kevin Schwantz grabbed pole position with a time of 2:09.239 - his third straight pole position of the year so far. In second place is home hero Shinichi Ito, in third place is Wayne Rainey and fourth is Mick Doohan. Freddie Spencer does not participate in the race due to an injury he sustained during qualifying.

For this round, Doohan's bike has an extra lever on the left side for the rear brake.

All riders take off and do their usual warm-up lap before lining up in their respective grid slots. As the lights go out, it is Schwantz who has a good getaway and retains his lead going into the First Corner (Turn 1). Right behind him is teammate Alex Barros who also had a great start from fifth on the grid to get into second position. Manages to outgun Rainey and hold off Doohan and Daryl Beattie to slot in behind the Team Lucky Strike Suzuki riders in third. In fourth is Japanese wildcard rider Norihiko Fujiwara. Fifth is Àlex Crivillé after a fantastic start from way back, with another wildcard rider - Toshihiko Honma - completing the top six after he also had a good start from the back. Rainey had a relatively bad start and is now only in ninth place on the opening lap. Exiting the Anti-Banked Curve (Turn 6), a group of three starts to form, consisting of Schwantz, Barros and Ito. Fujiwara then also opens up a small gap back to Crivillé himself. Ito then loses out a bit entering Degner (Turn 8), immediately being hounded by fellow Japanese Fujiwara. At the Hairpin (Turn 11), Honma tries a move on the inside of Crivillé but thinks better of it and stays behind. Further back at the same corner, two riders have crashed out of contention: Michael Rudroff and Jeremy McWilliams. Rudroff is seen pulling his bike off of the circuit with the help of a marshall, McWilliams is pulling his own bike from the ground with the help of another marshall and two other marshalls are cleaning up the circuit of the debris, McWilliams also pointing out that there's some oil on the middle of the circuit. At the Backstretch, Beattie has passed Honma and is now sixth. Barros has by now overtaken Schwantz for the lead, with the American trying a lunge up his inside coming up to the Casio Triangle (Turn 15), not being able to execute the move and having to stay behind for the time being. Fujiwara also has a look up Ito's inside but only manages to get closer and stays behind him for now.

On lap two, the top six is as follows: Barros, Schwantz, Ito, Fujiwara, Crivillé and Beattie. Crivillé passes Fujiwara for fourth at the start/finish straight entering the First Corner, Rainey doing likewise on Honma for seventh position. The marshalls have by now put some concrete dust on the oil to prevent riders from crashing out. At Dunlop (Turn 7), Ito closes up on Schwantz, with Beattie doing likewise on Crivillé. At the Hairpin, Rainey has gone up the inside of Beattie and has snatched sixth position away from him. Crivillé then tries to pass Ito around the outside of 200R (Turn 12) for third but isn't able to and stays in fourth place. At the Backstretch, Schwantz looks to be taking the lead from Barros but instead it is Ito who has taken first place from both riders, making good use of his superior Honda power to blast past before approaching the fast 130R (Turn 14). Behind them, Rainey has also taken Fujiwara for fifth spot. Schwantz then passes Ito by outbraking him at the Casio Triangle, with Beattie trying to pass Fujiwara around the outside for sixth position, failing and having to stay behind for the time being.

Lap three and Beattie manages to past Fujiwara, this time taking sixth position. At Snake (Turn 3), Rainey has caught up to Crivillé and is shadowing him for now. Exiting Dunlop, it is clear that Barros is now starting to struggle, losing ground to teammate Schwantz and with Crivillé and Rainey catching up to him quickly. Schwantz is now very close to Ito, making his move and passing him for the lead at Spoon Curve (Turn 13), going up his inside and outbraking him as a result. Exiting Spoon Curve however, it is Ito who has the upper hand and retakes the position on power. Schwantz tries to outbrake Ito entering the Casio Triangle but the Japanese has opened up enough of a gap to stay ahead for now.

On lap four, Ito has now opened up a small gap back to Schwantz, himself being caught up by Barros and Crivillé. Juan Lopez Mella has crashed out of contention on the exit of the Casio Triangle (Turn 16) on the previous lap, highsiding out of contention and his bike lying in the middle of the track on a dangerous position. One of the marshalls tries to recover the bike, risking his own life in the process. Entering Spoon Curve, Schwantz catches up a bit to Ito as Barros has now opened up a significant gap back to Rainey, who has passed Crivillé and is now fourth. At the Backstretch, Beattie has also passed Crivillé, promoting him up to fifth position. Rainey has also set pursuit to catch the top three.

Lap five and the top six is as follows: Ito, Schwantz, Barros, Rainey, Beattie and Crivillé. Entering Spoon Curve, Rainey has caught up to Barros who has lost ground to his teammate. At the exit of Degner (Turn 9), Lucio Pedercini has gone down. Two marshalls frantically signal that the rider has crashed, him lying motionless next to his destroyed bike. One of the marshalls picks up his bike to remove it from the circuit, Pedercini not moving an inch still.

On lap six, Schwantz has opened up a big gap to his teammate Barros, who himself is now coming under pressure of both Rainey and Beattie. Crivillé has lost a lot of ground and is now pretty far down in sixth. Exiting the First Corner (Turn 2), Schwantz has a look behind him to see how far back Barros is. Rainey has by now fully caught up to Barros and almost directly makes a move, going up his inside at Snake (Turn 5) and pushing the Brazilian slightly wide to get the perfect line exiting the corner. This now promotes him to third place. At the exit of Degner, the medical car has parked next to the track to assist Pedercini. Wainey has now opened up a slight gap to Barros, closing up to Schwantz in the process.

Lap seven and the front is stable for now. Rainey is slowly catching up to Schwantz. Exiting the Hairpin, yellow flags are waved for the medical car that is riding on the right side of the circuit, carrying a wounded Pedercini to the medical centre. Schwantz has also closed up to Ito again. Beattie has passed Barros for fourth by now.

On lap eight, Rainey is now right behind Schwantz. At Snake, he dives down his inside and takes away second position from him, then immediately opening up a small gap in pursuit of Ito. He closes up in under half a lap, already right behind Ito entering Spoon Curve. He tries a move at the second part of the corner but just falls short, allowing Ito some breathing room coming onto the Backstretch.

Lap nine and fourth place Beattie is now closing the gap to Schwantz. The top six is as follows: Ito, Rainey, Schwantz, Beattie, Barros and Crivillé. At the Casio Triangle on the previous lap, John Reynolds has crashed out, losing the front entering the chicane and beaching his bike in the gravel at low speed. He tries to pull it back up as the marshalls help him out, but to no avail. By now, Rainey has caught up to Ito again, Schwantz meanwhile losing terrain to the Marlboro Team Roberts rider. Exiting the Hairpin, the Japanese looks behind him to see how far back Rainey is. Exiting the 200R (Turn 12) and coming up to Spoon Curve, he goes around the outside to line up a pass going up the inside of the next corner, making the pass and taking over the lead of the race. However, Ito blasts past Rainey and retakes first place, making good use of his superior Honda power.

On lap ten, the fight is now between two men: Ito and Rainey, with Schwantz and Beattie a bit further behind. At Dunlop, Rainey closes up again as Ito has a slight twitch, Rainey then trying a move around the outside but not being able to pass for now. Entering the Hairpin, Rainey takes a wider line so that he can have a tighter exit line, setting himself up for a pass at the 200R. At said corner, he goes around the outside, making good use of the superior corning of the Yamaha to go past Ito and take the lead, almost going on the grass in the process. At the Backstretch though, Ito once again manages to pass Rainey thanks to his superior Honda top speed. At the Casio Triangle, Rainey tries another move around the outside, going side-by-side with Ito but being pushed wide upon entry.

Lap eleven and Schwantz has closed up to the fighting duo now. At Snake, Rainey has a look up the inside but isn't quite able to pass. At the exit of Dunlop, Rainey once again goes a bit wider to try and overtake Ito, the American still not being able to do so. Schwantz has now fully caught up to the duo. At the Hairpin, Rainey has a very deep lunge and passes Ito, only to run wide and lose the position to Ito upon exit, almost losing the place to third place Schwantz as well. Exiting the 200R, Rainey has another look but opts to stay behind Ito for now. Exiting Spoon Curve, Ito has a slight moment which allows Rainey and Doohan to stay close behind the Japanese. At the end of the Backstretch and entering 130R, Schwantz then makes a move and goes up the inside of Rainey, taking second position away from him. At the Casio Triangle, he then lunges up the inside of Ito and immediately takes the lead upon exit.

On lap twelve, Ito blasts past Schwantz' Suzuki to retake the lead entering the First Corner. All the fighting has allowed Beattie to close up to the trio, making this a four-way fight for victory. At Snake, Schwantz has a look up Ito's inside but stays behind for the time being. Beattie loses a bit of ground to Rainey as Schwantz is still harassing Ito for the lead. At the Hairpin, Schwantz dives down the inside and passes Ito for the lead of the race. During the turning, Ito has another slight moment that unsettles him, allowing Schwantz some vital breathing room at the 200R. Rziney also has a look around the outside of the fast right-hander but thinks better of it. Exiting the Spoon Curve, Rainey has a slight moment as well. Ito then effortlessly repasses Schwantz at the Backstretch, with Beattie catching up and passing Rainey for third right before the 130R as well, making this a full-on four-way battle for the win. At the Casio Triangle, Schwantz then takes a different line and goes up the inside of Ito, outbraking him and overtaking him for first.

Lap thirteen and Ito once again retakes the lead thanks to his superior Honda power at the start/finish straight. Beattie also has a look up Schwantz's inside but opts to stay behind for now. Rainey now starts to lose a bit of ground to the trio in front of him. The group now comes up to backmarker Andreas Meklau, who gets out of the way without any problems. At the Hairpin, Schwantz makes his move and takes over the lead from Ito, going up his inside. At the entrance of Spoon Curve, Beattie passes Ito around the outside, going a bit wide but retaining second place. Rainey also has a peek around the outside but has to stay behind for now. At the Backstretch, Beattie then blasts past Schwantz, promoting himself up to first position. Schwantz then has a look up Beattie's inside but isn't able to make a pass at the Casio Triangle this time.

On lap fourteen, the top six is as follows: Beattie, Schwantz, Ito, Rainey, Barros and Crivillé. Rainey now slightly loses some ground to Ito in third, but catches up rather quickly at Snake. Exiting Degner, it is now Ito who starts to lose a bit of ground to Schwantz. At Turn 10 heading up to the Hairpin, Schwantz tried to line up a pass around the outside but got blocked off by Beattie, with Rainey passing Ito at the outside of Turn 10, heading into the Hairping by going up a now struggling Ito's inside for third spot. Rainey then immediately starts closing the gap to Schwantz, who is still right behind Beattie. At the Casio Triangle, Schwantz closes up to Beattie again.

Lap fifteen and Ito closes up a bit on Rainey at the start/finish straight, the American also losing a bit of ground to Schwantz at the Casio Triangle on the previous lap. Exiting Dunlop, Schwantz is very close to Beattie as he takes a tighter line through the corner. The group now comes amongst another backmarker, this time being Cees Doorakkers. He gets out of the way as he slows down before Degner, allowing all four to pass without trouble. At 200R, Rainey looks to be making a move around the outside of Schwantz but opts to stick behind him for now. Exiting Spoon Curve, Schwantz has a slight moment, upsetting his exit and slowing him down a bit. This allows Rainey to get closer at the Backstretch but he is not able to pass Schwantz. At the Casio Triangle, Schwantz closes up again to Beattie, the Australian closing the door on him.

On lap sixteen, Schwantz has a quick look behind him to see where Rainey is exiting the First Corner. At the Anti-Banked Curve, Schwantz throws his bike up the inside via a tight line, passing Beattie and taking over at the front. Exiting Turn 10 and entering the Hairpin, Rainey makes his move and dives down the inside of Beattie, overtaking him for second position. This allows Schwantz to open up a small gap. Beattie in third closes up to Rainey at the Backstretch, almost passing the American but thinking better of it as they enter 130R.

Lap seventeen and Schwantz increases his lead slightly, Rainey trying to stay with Schwantz. The Honda's are now slightly behind. At Turn 1 heading onto the Hairpin, Rainey closes up and has a look but is not able to make a move yet. Beattie closes up at the Backstretch a bit as Ito now starts to lose ground to his teammate also.

On lap eighteen, the top six is as follows: Schwantz, Rainey, Beattie, Ito, Barros and Crivillé. At Nake, Rainey and Beattie manage to close the gap to Schwantz slightly. The American in front then has a moment at the short straight before Degner, allowing Rainey and Beattie to close up even more to him. The group now approaches another backmarker, this time being Renato Colleoni. He looks behind him, then slows down, puts his arm up and allows all the riders to pass him without any problems. At the exit of 200R, Rainey lines up a pass and executes it at the entrance of the Spoon Curve, going a bit wider upon exit but being able to maintain the lead. However, Schwantz repasses him at the Backstretch just before entering the 130R. Rainey tries a move around the outside but Schwantz, being very strong at the Casio Triangle, easily holds on and maintains first place. Beattie has now also closed up on the fighting duo and is right behind Rainey.

Lap nineteen and the grandstands cheer the riders on. At Snake, Rainey tries a divebomb down the inside of Schwantz but he closes the door on him. At the exit of the Anti-Banked Curve, he briefly looks behind to see where the rest is. At Dunlop, Rainey takes a slightly wider line but is able to get side-by-side with Schwantz, opting to stay behind for the time being. Beattie meanwhile is now right behind Rainey at the entrance of the Hairpin, the looks behind to see where his teammate is upon exit of the corner. At the Backstretch, Rainey overtakes Schwantz for what he thinks will be the lead, but instead it is Beattie who shoots past both riders to snatch first place away from them upon entry of the 130R. However, his exit is compromised and this allows Rainey to retake third exiting the corner and entering the Casio Triangle. Schwantz has now been relegated from first to third in the span of one straight.

On lap twenty, the penultimate lap of the race, Ito manages to pass Schwantz on the straight for third, the Lucky Strike Suzuki man losing another place as a result as the Japanese fans cheer him on. Schwantz then tries to retake the position at Snake but isn't able to. This has allowed Rainey to open up a gap to Beattie. Exiting Degner, Schwantz has a moment exiting the corner, unsettling his bike. At the fast Turn 10, Schwantz dives down the inside as the Japanese blocks him, the American still finding a way past as they enter the Hairpin and Ito goes wide. Side-by-side, they exit the hairpin and manages to get past. The group has to overtake three backmarkers - Alan Scott, Bruno Bonhuil and José Kuhn - they manage to get past of except for Schwantz, who gets blocked at the entrance of the Casio Triangle. This allows Ito to close right up to him.

Rainey crosses the line to start the final lap - lap twenty-one - and Ito tries to pass Schwantz but just isn't able to. He has it all to do as the battle for the win is now between Rainey and Beattie. Exiting Dunlop, Wainey slides his rear tyre to ensure that he's opened up enough of a gap for later on when they come onto the straights. Schwantz, through miracle almost, manages to close the gap to Beattie relatively quickly, taking Ito with him as a result. At the Backstretch, Beattie closes up and tries to take a different line to try and pass Rainey but instead gets surprised himself when Schwantz makes a do-or-die dive at the Casio Triangle and manages to pass Beattie for second, the fans cheering as the action unfolds at the last couple of corners. Schwantz then manages to get very close to Rainey but in the end, he wins the race by just +0.086 seconds behind a fast charging Schwantz. Third is Beattie and a bit further back Ito finishes in fourth. Behind the group of four, Crivillé has managed to overtake Barros on the last lap and heads home fifth, with Barros himself just holding off Doohan for sixth.

On the parade lap back to parc-fermé, Rainey puts his arm up in the air in glee, with Schwantz putting up his thumb to congratulate Rainey on his win. Both Rainey and Schwantz wave at the crowd, then stopping at the Snake complex as a fan who invaded the track hands him the American flag. He grabs it and continues his ride, waving it proudly.

On the podium, a visibly happy Rainey takes the trophy and lifts it up in the air. Schwantz receives his next, followed by Beattie. The American national anthem then plays for Rainey, discussing the race with Schwantz on the podium as it stops. The podium girls hand the riders the champagne, Schwantz then cheekily running after Kenny Roberts and spraying him in the commentary booth as a result. He quickly closes the door as the other two spray at the crowd and on each other. Schwantz and Rainey then toast with the bottles.

Rainey considered this his best win ever, being on a slower bike and winning by tactics and aggression.

== 500 cc classification ==
Pos.	No.	Rider	Team	Manufacturer	Time/Retired	Grid	Points
1	1	(United States) Wayne Rainey	Marlboro Team Roberts	Yamaha	46:12.307	3	25
2	34	(United States) Kevin Schwantz	Lucky Strike Suzuki	Suzuki	+0.086	1	20
3	4	(Australia) Daryl Beattie	Rothmans Honda Team	Honda	+0.287	6	16
4	6	(Japan) Shinichi Itoh	HRC Rothmans Honda	Honda	+1.782	2	13
5	8	(Spain) Àlex Crivillé	Marlboro Honda Pons	Honda	+22.532	14	11
6	9	(Brazil) Alex Barros	Lucky Strike Suzuki	Suzuki	+22.819	5	10
7	2	(Australia) Mick Doohan	Rothmans Honda Team	Honda	+23.004	4	9
8	39	(Japan) Toshihiko Honma	Yamaha Motor France	Yamaha	+25.559	10	8
9	88	(Australia) Kevin Magee	Nihontelecom Racing Team	Yamaha	+25.711	7	7
10	50	(Japan) Norihiko Fujiwara	Kirin Mets Racing Team	Yamaha	+34.865	9	6
11	5	(United States) Doug Chandler	Cagiva Team Agostini	Cagiva	+1:04.726	8	5
12	13	(Japan) Toshiyuki Arakaki	Team ROC	ROC Yamaha	+1:17.730	13	4
13	11	(United Kingdom) Niall Mackenzie	Valvoline Team WCM	ROC Yamaha	+1:18.044	17	3
14	15	(Japan) Tsutomu Udagawa	Team Udagawa	ROC Yamaha	+1:41.399	11	2
15	29	(United Kingdom) Sean Emmett	Shell Team Harris	Harris Yamaha	+1:46.827	22	1
16	21	(Belgium) Laurent Naveau	Euro Team	ROC Yamaha	+1:47.383	19	
17	25	(France) Thierry Crine	Ville de Paris	ROC Yamaha	+2:01.808	23	
18	22	(United Kingdom) Kevin Mitchell	MBM Racing	Harris Yamaha	+2:09.359	25	
19	32	(France) José Kuhn	Euromoto	ROC Yamaha	+1 Lap	30	
20	31	(France) Bruno Bonhuil	MTD Objectif 500	ROC Yamaha	+1 Lap	32	
21	44	(United States) Alan Scott	Team Harris	Harris Yamaha	+1 Lap	31	
22	27	(Italy) Renato Colleoni	Team Elit	ROC Yamaha	+1 Lap	28	
23	24	(Netherlands) Cees Doorakkers	Doorakkers Racing	Harris Yamaha	+1 Lap	33	
24	33	(Austria) Andreas Meklau	Austrian Racing Company	ROC Yamaha	+1 Lap	35	
Ret	23	(Switzerland) Serge David	Team ROC	ROC Yamaha	Retirement	29	
Ret	7	(Italy) Luca Cadalora	Marlboro Team Roberts	Yamaha	Retirement	12	
Ret	28	(United Kingdom) John Reynolds	Padgett's Motorcycles	Harris Yamaha	Retirement	18	
Ret	12	(Australia) Matthew Mladin	Cagiva Team Agostini	Cagiva	Retirement	16	
Ret	14	(Italy) Marco Papa	Librenti Corse	Librenti	Retirement	36	
Ret	36	(Italy) Lucio Pedercini	Team Pedercini	ROC Yamaha	Retirement	27	
Ret	30	(Spain) Juan Lopez Mella	Yamaha Motor France	ROC Yamaha	Retirement	21	
Ret	18	(France) Bernard Garcia	Lopez Mella Racing Team	Yamaha	Retirement	24	
Ret	35	(Switzerland) Jean Luc Romanens	Argus Racing Team	ROC Yamaha	Retirement	34	
Ret	20	(United Kingdom) Jeremy McWilliams	Rallye Sport	Yamaha	Retirement	20	
Ret	16	(Germany) Michael Rudroff	Millar Racing	Harris Yamaha	Retirement	26	
DNS	19	(United States) Freddie Spencer	Yamaha Motor France	Yamaha	Did not start		

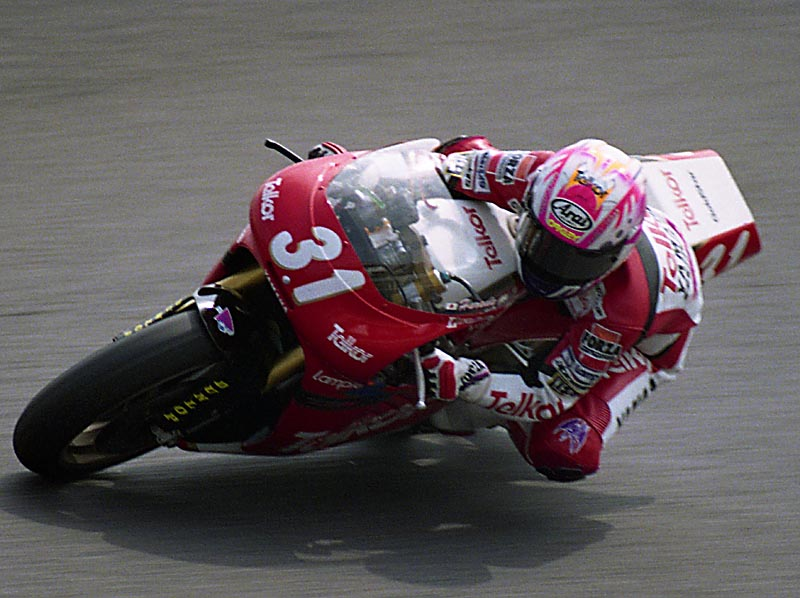
Tetsuya Harada, riding his bike at the 250cc race, which he went on to win.

== 250 cc classification ==
Pos	No	Rider	Manufacturer	Laps	Time/Retired	Grid	Points
1	31	(Japan) Tetsuya Harada	Yamaha	19	42:24.209	1	25
2	18	(Japan) Tadayuki Okada	Honda	19	+ 0.655	2	20
3	10	(Italy) Doriano Romboni	Honda	19	+ 20.524	3	16
4	14	(Japan) Nobuatsu Aoki	Honda	19	+ 20.571	9	13
5	17	(France) Jean-Philippe Ruggia	Aprilia	19	+ 20.622	5	11
6	4	(Germany) Helmut Bradl	Honda	19	+ 24.510	7	10
7	3	(Italy) Pierfrancesco Chili	Yamaha	19	+ 33.836	11	9
8	50	(Japan) Takuma Aoki	Honda	19	+ 37.391	13	8
9	19	(United States) John Kocinski	Suzuki	19	+ 43 s 017	6	7
10	65	(Italy) Loris Capirossi	Honda	19	+ 56.169	4	6
11	16	(Austria) Andreas Preining	Aprilia	19	+ 59.467	12	5
12	24	(Netherlands) Patrick van den Goorbergh	Aprilia	19	+ 59.566	16	4
13	34	(Spain) Luis d'Antin	Honda	19	+ 59.749	22	3
14	7	(Germany) Jochen Schmid	Yamaha	19	+1:00.102	17	2
15	6	(Spain) Alberto Puig	Honda	19	+1:00.533	14	1
16	11	(Netherlands) Wilco Zeelenberg	Aprilia	19	+1:09.590	25	
17	20	(Switzerland) Eskil Suter	Aprilia	19	+1:10.019	23	
18	39	(Italy) Alessandro Gramigni	Gilera	19	+1:16.252	15	
19	25	(Netherlands) Jurgen van den Goorbergh	Aprilia	19	+1:30.209	26	
20	27	(France) Frédéric Protat	Aprilia	19	+1:33.313	30	
21	44	(France) Jean-Michel Bayle	Aprilia	19	+1:37.638	29	
22	26	(Germany) Bernd Kassner	Aprilia	19	+1:53.458	32	
23	30	(Spain) Juan Borja	Honda	19	+1:53:758	27	
24	23	(Switzerland) Bernard Haenggeli	Aprilia	19	+1:53.934	28	
25	12	(Italy) Gabriele Debbia	Honda	19	+2:08.931	31	
26	32	(Germany) Volker Bähr	Honda	18	+1 Lap	36	
27	43	(Italy) Massimo Pennacchioli	Honda	18	+1 Lap	35	
28	15	(Japan) Nobuyuki Wakai	Suzuki	15	+4 Laps	18	
Ret	21	(Italy) Paolo Casoli	Gilera	14	Retirement	20	
Ret	22	(Spain) Luis Maurel	Aprilia	14	Retirement	33	
Ret	28	(Switzerland) Adrian Bosshard	Honda	12	Retirement	21	
Ret	13	(Italy) Loris Reggiani	Aprilia	12	Retirement	8	
Ret	52	(Japan) Osamu Miyazaki	Aprilia	10	Retirement	24	
Ret	5	(Italy) Max Biaggi	Honda	4	Retirement	10	
DNS	8	(Spain) Carlos Cardús	Honda		Did not start	19	
DNS	51	(France) Jean-Pierre Jeandat	Aprilia		did not start	34	

Previous race: 1993 Malaysian Grand Prix	FIM Grand Prix World Championship; 1993 season	Next race: 1993 Spanish Grand Prix
Previous race: 1992 Japanese Grand Prix	Japanese Grand Prix	Next race: 1994 Japanese Grand Prix
