= 1993 United States motorcycle Grand Prix =

1993 United States Grand Prix
Race details
- Race 13 of 14 races in the 1993 Grand Prix motorcycle racing season
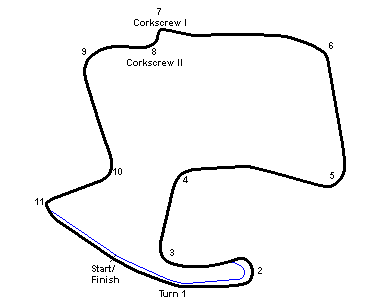
- Date: September 12, 1993
- Official name: United States Motorcycle Grand Prix
- Location: Laguna Seca Raceway
- Course: Permanent racing facility; 3.602 km (2.238 mi)

500cc
Pole position
- Rider: (Australia) Mick Doohan
- Time: 1:26.417
Fastest lap
- Rider: (United States) Kevin Schwantz
- Time: 1:26.837
Podium
- First: (United States) John Kocinski
- Second: (Brazil) Alex Barros
- Third: (Italy) Luca Cadalora

250cc
Pole position
- Rider: (Italy) Loris Capirossi
- Time: 1:27.756
Fastest lap
- Rider: (Italy) Loris Capirossi
- Time: 1:27.959
Podium
- First: (Italy) Loris Capirossi
- Second: (Italy) Doriano Romboni
- Third: (Italy) Loris Reggiani

125cc
Pole position
- Rider: (Japan) Kazuto Sakata
- Time: 1:33.459
Fastest lap
- Rider: (Japan) Kazuto Sakata
- Time: 1:32.971
Podium
- First: (Germany) Dirk Raudies
- Second: (Japan) Kazuto Sakata
- Third: (Germany) Ralf Waldmann

The 1993 United States motorcycle Grand Prix was the penultimate round of the 1993 Grand Prix motorcycle racing season. It took place on September 12, 1993, at Laguna Seca Raceway.

== 500 cc race report ==
It came to be known that Wayne Rainey’s career had been over following his crash in the previous round. As a result, Kevin Schwantz had clinched the 1993 world championship by the end of this round as he finished fourth.

Kenny Roberts commented on Rainey’s retirement, "I’ve thought about it the last week, but Wayne wants to work in Grand Prix racing. That’s going to keep the edge sharp, because he wants to help the team, he wants to help riders, he wants to follow along in what I’ve done. And that’s going to keep me involved. Wayne’s a big, big part of my team, and if he was disgusted with the whole thing, then yeah, it’d probably take a lot of the edge off. And he doesn’t show any signs of that and that’s probably going to keep me involved, otherwise I ... well, you know, I can do anything I want to do, but he’s a driving force right now."

Despite having recently been crowned the world champion, Schwantz was equally concerned about Rainey, remarking, "Everybody’s thinking about Wayne, and we all wish Wayne and Shae and Rex the best, but at the same time, I feel like we raced all season ... to put ourselves in a position to be there to take advantage of any opportunities, any doors that were open. I feel like we still earned it — we weren’t given it."

Rainey himself commended Schwantz on his championship title, saying, "Kevin called. I said to him: You deserve it. And hey, I made the mistake. It doesn’t take anything away from what you did to win your championship."

John Kocinski took the start from Mick Doohan, Schwantz and Alex Barros.

Teammates Schwantz and Barros passed Kocinski.

Barros started to pull away, and at Turn 11, Kocinski tried an inside pass on Schwantz that failed to stick, allowing Doohan to come up as the three went down the straight three abreast. Schwantz stayed to the inside and took the hairpin ahead of Doohan and Kocinski.

Doohan got past Schwantz and hunted down Barros to take the lead. Kocinski also passed Barros.

Doohan's bike hopped a bit on the exit of The Corkscrew, causing him to lose his footing and almost ride his bike side-saddle, only to later clip the hay bales on the left side of the track with his shoulder. He was almost hit by two bikes as he slid into the track, but managed to get up with a bit of pain.

Kocinski's win was Cagiva’s first dry win in GP racing; Eddie Lawson won a wet race last year, but a lucky tire choice was seen as the main reason for the win.

== 500 cc classification ==
| Pos. | Rider | Team | Manufacturer | Time/Retired | Points |
|---|---|---|---|---|---|
| 1 | (United States) John Kocinski | Cagiva Team Agostini | Cagiva | 48:17.175 | 25 |
| 2 | (Brazil) Alex Barros | Lucky Strike Suzuki | Suzuki | +6.375 | 20 |
| 3 | (Italy) Luca Cadalora | Marlboro Team Roberts | Yamaha | +10.489 | 16 |
| 4 | (United States) Kevin Schwantz | Lucky Strike Suzuki | Suzuki | +18.265 | 13 |
| 5 | (Australia) Daryl Beattie | Rothmans Honda Team | Honda | +19.493 | 11 |
| 6 | (Japan) Shinichi Itoh | HRC Rothmans Honda | Honda | +37.292 | 10 |
| 7 | (Spain) Àlex Crivillé | Marlboro Honda Pons | Honda | +39.317 | 9 |
| 8 | (United Kingdom) Niall Mackenzie | Valvoline Team WCM | ROC Yamaha | +42.851 | 8 |
| 9 | (United Kingdom) John Reynolds | Padgett's Motorcycles | Harris Yamaha | +1 Lap | 7 |
| 10 | (Spain) Juan Lopez Mella | Lopez Mella Racing Team | ROC Yamaha | +1 Lap | 6 |
| 11 | (France) José Kuhn | Euromoto | Yamaha | +1 Lap | 5 |
| 12 | (United Kingdom) Jeremy McWilliams | Millar Racing | Yamaha | +1 Lap | 4 |
| 13 | (United Kingdom) Sean Emmett | Shell Team Harris | Harris Yamaha | +1 Lap | 3 |
| 14 | (Switzerland) Serge David | Team ROC | ROC Yamaha | +1 Lap | 2 |
| 15 | (Belgium) Laurent Naveau | Euro Team | ROC Yamaha | +1 Lap | 1 |
| 16 | (United Kingdom) David Jefferies | Peter Graves Racing Team | Harris Yamaha | +1 Lap | |
| 17 | (Japan) Tsutomu Udagawa | Team Udagawa | ROC Yamaha | +1 Lap | |
| 18 | (Germany) Michael Rudroff | Rallye Sport | Harris Yamaha | +1 Lap | |
| 19 | (Austria) Andreas Meklau | Austrian Racing Company | ROC Yamaha | +1 Lap | |
| 20 | (France) Bruno Bonhuil | MTD Objectif 500 | ROC Yamaha | +1 Lap | |
| Ret | (Australia) Matthew Mladin | Cagiva Team Agostini | Cagiva | Retirement | |
| Ret | (France) Thierry Crine | Ville de Paris | ROC Yamaha | Retirement | |
| Ret | (Italy) Renato Colleoni | Team Elit | ROC Yamaha | Retirement | |
| Ret | (United Kingdom) Kevin Mitchell | MBM Racing | Harris Yamaha | Retirement | |
| Ret | (Netherlands) Cees Doorakkers | Doorakkers Racing | Harris Yamaha | Retirement | |
| Ret | (Australia) Mick Doohan | Rothmans Honda Team | Honda | Retirement | |
| Ret | (New Zealand) Andrew Stroud | Team Harris | Harris Yamaha | Retirement | |
| Ret | (Italy) Marco Papa | Librenti Corse | Harris Yamaha | Retirement | |
| Ret | (Italy) Lucio Pedercini | Team Pedercini | ROC Yamaha | Retirement | |
| Ret | (France) Bernard Garcia | Yamaha Motor France | Yamaha | Retirement | |
| Ret | (United States) Danny Walker | Southwest Motorsports | Harris Yamaha | Retirement | |
| Ret | (United States) Doug Chandler | Cagiva Team Agostini | Cagiva | Retirement | |
| DNS | (United States) Freddie Spencer | Yamaha Motor France | Yamaha | Did not start | |

== 250 cc classification ==
| Pos | Rider | Manufacturer | Time/Retired | Points |
|---|---|---|---|---|
| 1 | (Italy) Loris Capirossi | Honda | 46:04.505 | 25 |
| 2 | (Italy) Doriano Romboni | Honda | +1.381 | 20 |
| 3 | (Italy) Loris Reggiani | Aprilia | +3.803 | 16 |
| 4 | (Spain) Alberto Puig | Honda | +3.881 | 13 |
| 5 | (Japan) Tetsuya Harada | Yamaha | +4.619 | 11 |
| 6 | (Italy) Pierfrancesco Chili | Yamaha | +12.279 | 10 |
| 7 | (Japan) Nobuatsu Aoki | Honda | +18.166 | 9 |
| 8 | (Germany) Helmut Bradl | Honda | +19.861 | 8 |
| 9 | (Japan) Tadayuki Okada | Honda | +28.044 | 7 |
| 10 | (United States) Kenny Roberts Jr | Yamaha | +44.751 | 6 |
| 11 | (Spain) Luis d'Antin | Honda | +45.113 | 5 |
| 12 | (Spain) Juan Borja | Honda | +55.484 | 4 |
| 13 | (France) Frédéric Protat | Aprilia | +56.529 | 3 |
| 14 | (Spain) Carlos Checa | Honda | +57.555 | 2 |
| 15 | (Switzerland) Adrian Bosshard | Honda | +1:02.409 | 1 |
| 16 | (Netherlands) Patrick van den Goorbergh | Aprilia | +1:02.565 | |
| 17 | (Spain) Pere Riba | Honda | +1:04.795 | |
| 18 | (Switzerland) Bernard Haenggeli | Aprilia | +1:15.641 | |
| 19 | (Spain) Luis Maurel | Aprilia | +1 Lap | |
| 20 | (Germany) Bernd Kassner | Aprilia | +1 Lap | |
| 21 | (France) Jean-Pierre Jeandat | Aprilia | +1 Lap | |
| 22 | (Italy) Massimo Pennachioli | Honda | +1 Lap | |
| Ret | (Italy) Max Biaggi | Honda | Retirement | |
| Ret | (Austria) Andy Preining | Aprilia | Retirement | |
| Ret | (Switzerland) Eskil Suter | Aprilia | Retirement | |
| Ret | (New Zealand) Simon Crafar | Suzuki | Retirement | |
| Ret | (Netherlands) Wilco Zeelenberg | Aprilia | Retirement | |
| Ret | (Germany) Jochen Schmid | Yamaha | Retirement | |
| Ret | (France) Jean-Philippe Ruggia | Aprilia | Retirement | |
| Ret | (France) Jean-Michel Bayle | Aprilia | Retirement | |
| Ret | (Germany) Volker Bahr | Honda | Retirement | |

== Notes ==
| Previous race: 1993 Italian Grand Prix | FIM Grand Prix World Championship; 1993 season | Next race: 1993 FIM Grand Prix |
| Previous race: 1991 United States Grand Prix | United States Grand Prix | Next race: 1994 United States Grand Prix |
