= 1993 Australian motorcycle Grand Prix =

1993 MotoGP in Australia

(Australia) 1993 Australian Grand Prix
Race details
- Race 1 of 14 races in the 1993 Grand Prix motorcycle racing season
- Date: 28 March 1993
- Official name: Foster's Australian Motorcycle Grand Prix
- Location: Eastern Creek Raceway
- Course: Permanent racing facility; 3.930 km (2.442 mi)

500cc
Pole position
- Rider: (United States) Kevin Schwantz
- Time: 1:31.188
Fastest lap
- Rider: (United States) Wayne Rainey
- Time: 1:31.807
Podium
- First: (United States) Kevin Schwantz
- Second: (United States) Wayne Rainey
- Third: (United States) Doug Chandler

250cc
Pole position
- Rider: (Italy) Loris Capirossi
- Time: 1:32.896
Fastest lap
- Rider: (Japan) Tetsuya Harada
- Time: 1:32.894
Podium
- First: (Japan) Tetsuya Harada
- Second: (United States) John Kocinski
- Third: (Italy) Max Biaggi

125cc
Pole position
- Rider: (Spain) Carlos Giró
- Time: 1:37.858
Fastest lap
- Rider: (Germany) Dirk Raudies
- Time: 1:37.819
Podium
- First: (Germany) Dirk Raudies
- Second: (Japan) Kazuto Sakata
- Third: (Spain) Herri Torrontegui

The 1993 Australian motorcycle Grand Prix was the first round of the 1993 Grand Prix motorcycle racing season. It took place on 28 March 1993 at Eastern Creek Raceway.

== 500 cc race report ==
Beattie and Chandler get a small gap, then Beattie starts pulling away.

Schwantz, Chandler, Rainey are closing on Beattie. Doohan goes out with a mechanical. Freddie Spencer crashes out hard.

Schwantz arrives and passes into 1st. Rainey, desperate to get to the leaders, brushes Chandler's front tire with his knee as he passes into 2nd, then passes Schwantz for 1st, but cannot hold him off.

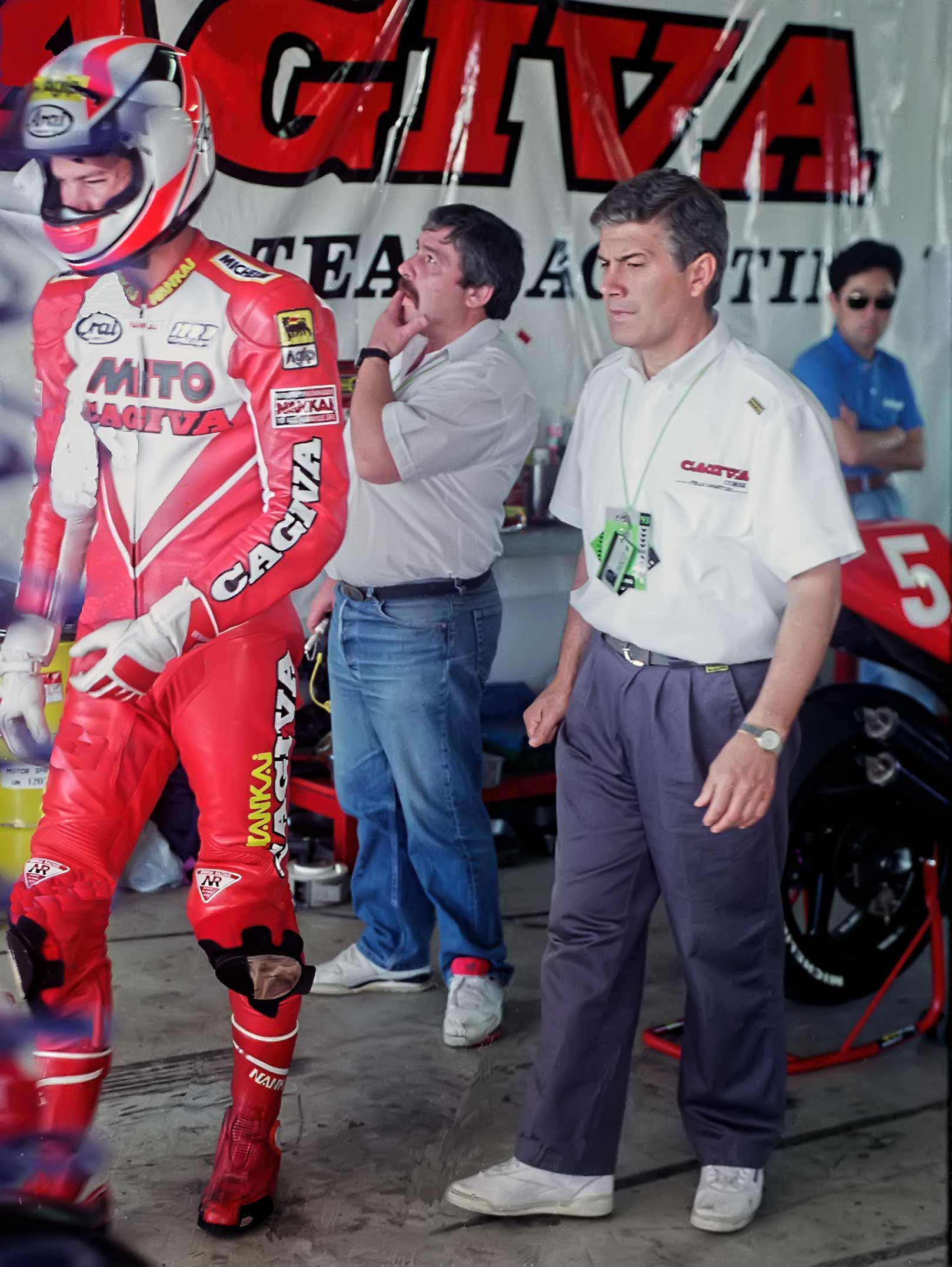
Doug Chandler, pictured with Italian legend Giacomo Agostini in the Cagiva pits. He went on to finish third at the 500cc race.

== 500 cc classification ==
Pos.	No.	Rider	Team	Manufacturer	Laps	Time/Retired	Grid	Points
1	34	(United States) Kevin Schwantz	Lucky Strike Suzuki	Suzuki	30	46:21.885	1	25
2	1	(United States) Wayne Rainey	Marlboro Team Roberts	Yamaha	30	+3.118	2	20
3	5	(United States) Doug Chandler	Cagiva Team Agostini	Cagiva	30	+6.111	4	16
4	4	(Australia) Daryl Beattie	Rothmans Honda Team	Honda	30	+12.430	3	13
5	9	(Brazil) Alex Barros	Lucky Strike Suzuki	Suzuki	30	+36.435	7	11
6	8	(Spain) Àlex Crivillé	Marlboro Honda Pons	Honda	30	+36.672	5	10
7	6	(Japan) Shinichi Itoh	HRC Rothmans Honda	Honda	30	+39.192	6	9
8	7	(Italy) Luca Cadalora	Marlboro Team Roberts	Yamaha	30	+52.962	10	8
9	12	(Australia) Mat Mladin	Cagiva Team Agostini	Cagiva	30	+1:16.298	12	7
10	11	(United Kingdom) Niall Mackenzie	Valvoline Team WCM	ROC Yamaha	30	+1:20.844	13	6
11	21	(Belgium) Laurent Naveau	Euro Team	ROC Yamaha	29	+1 Lap	24	5
12	18	(France) Bernard Garcia	Yamaha Motor France	Yamaha	29	+1 Lap	18	4
13	32	(France) José Kuhn	Euromoto	ROC Yamaha	29	+1 Lap	17	3
14	15	(Japan) Tsutomu Udagawa	Team Udagawa	ROC Yamaha	29	+1 Lap	15	2
15	23	(Switzerland) Serge David	Team ROC	ROC Yamaha	29	+1 Lap	22	1
16	29	(United Kingdom) Sean Emmett	Shell Team Harris	Harris Yamaha	29	+1 Lap	26	
17	27	(Italy) Renato Colleoni	Team Elit	ROC Yamaha	29	+1 Lap	25	
18	36	(Italy) Lucio Pedercini	Team Pedercini	ROC Yamaha	29	+1 Lap	27	
19	33	(Austria) Andreas Meklau	Austrian Racing Company	ROC Yamaha	29	+1 Lap	30	
20	35	(Switzerland) Jean Luc Romanens	Argus Racing Team	ROC Yamaha	28	+2 Laps	31	
21	24	(Netherlands) Cees Doorakkers	Doorakkers Racing	Harris Yamaha	28	+2 Laps	32	
22	44	(United States) Alan Scott	Team Harris	Harris Yamaha	27	+3 Laps	33	
23	13	(Japan) Toshiyuki Arakaki	Team ROC	ROC Yamaha	25	+5 Laps	21	
Ret	46	(Australia) Peter Goddard	Lucky Strike Suzuki	Suzuki	28	Retirement	9	
Ret	30	(Spain) Juan Lopez Mella	Lopez Mella Racing Team	ROC Yamaha	27	Retirement	19	
Ret	16	(Germany) Michael Rudroff	Rallye Sport	Harris Yamaha	25	Retirement	16	
Ret	19	(United States) Freddie Spencer	Yamaha Motor France	Yamaha	19	Retirement	11	
Ret	22	(United Kingdom) Kevin Mitchell	MBM Racing	Harris Yamaha	18	Retirement	20	
Ret	2	(Australia) Mick Doohan	Rothmans Honda Team	Honda	17	Retirement	8	
Ret	25	(France) Thierry Crine	Ville de Paris	ROC Yamaha	8	Retirement	29	
Ret	28	(United Kingdom) John Reynolds	Padgett's Motorcycles	Harris Yamaha	8	Retirement	14	
Ret	20	(United Kingdom) Jeremy McWilliams	Millar Racing	Yamaha	7	Retirement	23	
Ret	14	(Italy) Marco Papa	Librenti Corse	Librenti	4	Retirement	34	
Ret	31	(France) Bruno Bonhuil	MTD Objectif 500	ROC Yamaha	4	Retirement	28	

== 250 cc classification ==
Pos	No.	Rider	Manufacturer	Laps	Time/Retired	Grid	Points
1	31	(Japan) Tetsuya Harada	Yamaha	28	43:57.049	3	25
2	19	(United States) John Kocinski	Suzuki	28	+0.030	4	20
3	5	(Italy) Max Biaggi	Honda	28	+6.160	2	16
4	18	(Japan) Tadayuki Okada	Honda	28	+9.597	9	13
5	14	(Japan) Nobuatsu Aoki	Honda	28	+9.599	5	11
6	8	(Spain) Carlos Cardús	Honda	28	+9.946	7	10
7	10	(Italy) Doriano Romboni	Honda	28	+10.569	6	9
8	4	(Germany) Helmut Bradl	Honda	28	+13.571	10	8
9	17	(France) Jean-Philippe Ruggia	Aprilia	28	+19.507	11	7
10	3	(Italy) Pierfrancesco Chili	Yamaha	28	+19.949	14	6
11	11	(Netherlands) Wilco Zeelenberg	Aprilia	28	+32.632	8	5
12	7	(Germany) Jochen Schmid	Yamaha	28	+56.034	12	4
13	6	(Spain) Alberto Puig	Honda	28	+57.581	20	3
14	13	(Italy) Loris Reggiani	Aprilia	28	+57.996	13	2
15	28	(Switzerland) Adrian Bosshard	Honda	28	+1:06.575	15	1
16	21	(Italy) Paolo Casoli	Gilera	28	+1:08.841	18	
17	25	(Netherlands) Jurgen van den Goorbergh	Aprilia	28	+1:19.138	24	
18	51	(France) Jean-Pierre Jeandat	Aprilia	28	+1:21.333	21	
19	44	(France) Jean-Michel Bayle	Aprilia	28	+1:27.160	29	
20	26	(Germany) Bernd Kassner	Aprilia	28	+1:27.625	30	
21	15	(Japan) Noboyuki Wakai	Suzuki	28	+1:31.277	17	
22	47	(Australia) Rene Bongers	Honda	27	+1 lap	34	
23	12	(Italy) Gabriele Debbia	Honda	27	+1 lap	33	
24	43	(Italy) Massimo Pennacchioli	Honda	26	+2 laps	36	
Ret	27	(France) Frédéric Protat	Aprilia	26	Retirement	28	
Ret	16	(Austria) Andreas Preining	Aprilia	22	Retirement	22	
Ret	22	(Spain) Luis Maurel	Aprilia	20	Retirement	32	
Ret	65	(Italy) Loris Capirossi	Honda	17	Retirement	1	
Ret	23	(Switzerland) Bernard Haenggeli	Aprilia	17	Retirement	25	
Ret	30	(Spain) Juan Borja	Honda	12	Retirement	27	
Ret	24	(Netherlands) Patrick van den Goorbergh	Aprilia	5	Retirement	26	
Ret	39	(Italy) Alessandro Gramigni	Gilera	5	Retirement	19	
Ret	34	(Spain) Luis d'Antin	Honda	2	Retirement	16	
Ret	20	(Switzerland) Eskil Suter	Aprilia	2	Retirement	23	
Ret	32	(Germany) Volker Bähr	Honda	0	Retirement	35	
Ret	46	(Australia) Steven Whitehouse	Yamaha	0	Retirement	31	

Previous race: 1992 South African Grand Prix	FIM Grand Prix World Championship; 1993 season	Next race: 1993 Malaysian Grand Prix
Previous race: 1992 Australian Grand Prix	Australian motorcycle Grand Prix	Next race: 1994 Australian Grand Prix
