= 1993 FIM motorcycle Grand Prix =

1993 FIM Grand Prix
Race details
- Race 14 of 14 races in the 1993 Grand Prix motorcycle racing season
- Date: 26 September 1993
- Official name: Gran Premio FIM de la Comunidad de Madrid
- Location: Circuito del Jarama
- Course: Permanent racing facility; 3.404 km (2.115 mi)

500cc
Pole position
- Rider: (United States) John Kocinski
- Time: 1:32.849
Fastest lap
- Rider: (United States) John Kocinski
- Time: 1:34.090
Podium
- First: (Brazil) Alex Barros
- Second: (Australia) Daryl Beattie
- Third: (United States) Kevin Schwantz

250cc
Pole position
- Rider: (Italy) Loris Capirossi
- Time: 1:34.559
Fastest lap
- Rider: (Italy) Loris Capirossi
- Time: 1:34.941
Podium
- First: (Japan) Tetsuya Harada
- Second: (Italy) Loris Reggiani
- Third: (Italy) Max Biaggi

125cc
Pole position
- Rider: (Germany) Dirk Raudies
- Time: 1:40.770
Fastest lap
- Rider: (Japan) Noboru Ueda
- Time: 1:41.113
Podium
- First: (Germany) Ralf Waldmann
- Second: (Japan) Takeshi Tsujimura
- Third: (Japan) Kazuto Sakata

The 1993 FIM motorcycle Grand Prix was the last round of the 1993 Grand Prix motorcycle racing season. It took place on 26 September 1993 at the Jarama circuit and was held to replace the South African Grand Prix.

== 500 cc race report ==
Mick Doohan is out with a broken collarbone.

Kevin Schwantz takes the start, but John Kocinski is soon through, then it’s Shinichi Itoh, Luca Cadalora, Alex Barros, and Daryl Beattie.

Cadalora crashes out, as does Itoh and Kocinski. Kocinski smacks a medic who is trying to help get the Cagiva going again.

== 500 cc classification ==
Pos.	No.	Rider	Team	Manufacturer	Laps	Time/Retired	Grid	Points
1	9	(Brazil) Alex Barros	Lucky Strike Suzuki	Suzuki	28	44:22.944	2	25
2	4	(Australia) Daryl Beattie	Rothmans Honda Team	Honda	28	+4.736	6	20
3	34	(United States) Kevin Schwantz	Lucky Strike Suzuki	Suzuki	28	+17.578	3	16
4	8	(Spain) Àlex Crivillé	Marlboro Honda Pons	Honda	28	+22.816	9	13
5	5	(United States) Doug Chandler	Cagiva Team Agostini	Cagiva	28	+58.410	8	11
6	12	(Australia) Mat Mladin	Cagiva Team Agostini	Cagiva	28	+1:10.298	13	10
7	18	(France) Bernard Garcia	Yamaha Motor France	Yamaha	28	+1:10.734	20	9
8	11	(United Kingdom) Niall Mackenzie	Valvoline Team WCM	ROC Yamaha	28	+1:16.272	7	8
9	28	(United Kingdom) John Reynolds	Padgett's Motorcycles	Harris Yamaha	28	+1:20.278	11	7
10	32	(France) José Kuhn	Euromoto	Yamaha	28	+1:23.009	18	6
11	20	(United Kingdom) Jeremy McWilliams	Millar Racing	Yamaha	28	+1:31.922	21	5
12	42	(New Zealand) Andrew Stroud	Team Harris	Harris Yamaha	28	+1:32.444	17	4
13	22	(United Kingdom) Kevin Mitchell	MBM Racing	Harris Yamaha	27	+1 lap	19	3
14	29	(United Kingdom) Sean Emmett	Shell Team Harris	Harris Yamaha	27	+1 lap	27	2
15	36	(Italy) Lucio Pedercini	Team Pedercini	ROC Yamaha	27	+1 lap	15	1
16	51	(France) Jean-Marc Deletang	Yamaha Motor France	Yamaha	27	+1 lap	26	
17	31	(France) Bruno Bonhuil	MTD Objectif 500	ROC Yamaha	27	+1 lap	24	
18	43	(United Kingdom) David Jefferies	Peter Graves Racing Team	Harris Yamaha	27	+1 lap	25	
19	25	(France) Thierry Crine	Ville de Paris	ROC Yamaha	27	+1 lap	23	
20	76	(Italy) Dario Marchetti	Ha Team GOJ Motor	Harris Yamaha	26	+2 laps	31	
21	24	(Netherlands) Cees Doorakkers	Doorakkers Racing	Harris Yamaha	26	+2 laps	28	
Ret	30	(Spain) Juan Lopez Mella	Lopez Mella Racing Team	ROC Yamaha	24	Retirement	10	
Ret	3	(United States) John Kocinski	Cagiva Team Agostini	Cagiva	21	Retirement	1	
Ret	6	(Japan) Shinichi Itoh	HRC Rothmans Honda	Honda	20	Retirement	4	
Ret	7	(Italy) Luca Cadalora	Marlboro Team Roberts	Yamaha	17	Retirement	5	
Ret	16	(Germany) Michael Rudroff	Rallye Sport	Harris Yamaha	17	Retirement	12	
Ret	27	(Italy) Renato Colleoni	Team Elit	ROC Yamaha	15	Retirement	16	
Ret	33	(Austria) Andreas Meklau	Austrian Racing Company	ROC Yamaha	14	Retirement	30	
Ret	69	(United Kingdom) James Haydon	Euro Team	ROC Yamaha	7	Retirement	22	
Ret	15	(Japan) Tsutomu Udagawa	Team Udagawa	ROC Yamaha	7	Retirement	14	
Ret	23	(Switzerland) Serge David	Team ROC	ROC Yamaha	4	Retirement	29	

== 250 cc classification ==
Pos	No.	Rider	Manufacturer	Laps	Time/Retired	Grid	Points
1	31	(Japan) Tetsuya Harada	Yamaha	27	43:12.677	5	25
2	13	(Italy) Loris Reggiani	Aprilia	27	+1.217	4	20
3	5	(Italy) Max Biaggi	Honda	27	+6.791	9	16
4	6	(Spain) Alberto Puig	Honda	27	+12.729	10	13
5	65	(Italy) Loris Capirossi	Honda	27	+13.447	1	11
6	10	(Italy) Doriano Romboni	Honda	27	+13.631	3	10
7	24	(Netherlands) Patrick van den Goorbergh	Aprilia	27	+46.110	12	9
8	3	(Italy) Pierfrancesco Chili	Yamaha	27	+51.251	8	8
9	38	(Spain) Carlos Checa	Honda	27	+55.357	14	7
10	20	(Switzerland) Eskil Suter	Aprilia	27	+58.037	21	6
11	7	(Germany) Jochen Schmid	Yamaha	27	+58.307	17	5
12	44	(France) Jean-Michel Bayle	Aprilia	27	+58.547	24	2
13	16	(Austria) Andreas Preining	Aprilia	27	+59.221	20	3
14	11	(Netherlands) Wilco Zeelenberg	Aprilia	27	+1:00.547	23	2
15	28	(Switzerland) Adrian Bosshard	Honda	27	+1:03.303	15	1
16	22	(Spain) Luis Maurel	Aprilia	27	+1:21.021	28	
17	54	(Spain) Miguel Castilla	Yamaha	27	+1:21.425	22	
18	26	(Germany) Bernd Kassner	Aprilia	27	+1:23.101	27	
19	27	(France) Frédéric Protat	Aprilia	26	+1 lap	25	
20	32	(Germany) Volker Bähr	Honda	26	+1 lap	30	
21	43	(Italy) Massimo Pennacchioli	Honda	26	+1 lap	29	
22	51	(France) Jean-Pierre Jeandat	Aprilia	26	+1 lap	32	
Ret	17	(France) Jean-Philippe Ruggia	Aprilia	19	Retirement	2	
Ret	14	(Japan) Nobuatsu Aoki	Honda	19	Retirement	11	
Ret	30	(Spain) Juan Borja	Honda	19	Retirement	13	
Ret	77	(Spain) Sete Gibernau	Yamaha	15	Retirement	19	
Ret	37	(New Zealand) Simon Crafar	Suzuki	13	Retirement	18	
Ret	23	(Switzerland) Bernard Haenggeli	Aprilia	11	Retirement	26	
Ret	36	(Spain) Pere Riba	Honda	8	Retirement	16	
Ret	25	(Netherlands) Jurgen van den Goorbergh	Aprilia	2	Retirement	31	
Ret	4	(Germany) Helmut Bradl	Honda	2	Retirement	7	
Ret	18	(Japan) Tadayuki Okada	Honda	1	Retirement	6	

Previous race: 1993 United States Grand Prix	FIM Grand Prix World Championship; 1993 season	Next race: 1994 Australian Grand Prix
Previous race: None	FIM Grand Prix	Next race: None
