= 1993 Malaysian motorcycle Grand Prix =

(Malaysia) 1993 Malaysian Grand Prix
Race details
- Race 2 of 14 races in the 1993 Grand Prix motorcycle racing season
- Date: 4 April 1993
- Official name: Malaysia Grand Prix
- Location: Shah Alam Circuit
- Course: Permanent racing facility; 3.69 km (2.29 mi)

500cc
Pole position
- Rider: (United States) Kevin Schwantz
- Time: 1:25.533
Fastest lap
- Rider: (United States) Wayne Rainey
- Time: 1:26.206
Podium
- First: (United States) Wayne Rainey
- Second: (Australia) Daryl Beattie
- Third: (United States) Kevin Schwantz

250cc
Pole position
- Rider: (Italy) Loris Capirossi
- Time: 1:27.229
Fastest lap
- Rider: (Japan) Nobuatsu Aoki
- Time: 1:27.415
Podium
- First: (Japan) Nobuatsu Aoki
- Second: (Japan) Tetsuya Harada
- Third: (Japan) Tadayuki Okada

125cc
Pole position
- Rider: (Germany) Dirk Raudies
- Time: 1:31.951
Fastest lap
- Rider: (Germany) Dirk Raudies
- Time: 1:32.821
Podium
- First: (Germany) Dirk Raudies
- Second: (Japan) Kazuto Sakata
- Third: (Japan) Takeshi Tsujimura

The 1993 Malaysian motorcycle Grand Prix was the second round of the 1993 Grand Prix motorcycle racing season. It took place on the weekend of 4 April 1993 at the Shah Alam Circuit.

== 500 cc race report ==
Kevin Schwantz got the second pole in a row, but started poorly while Wayne Rainey got a good start, followed by Àlex Crivillé, Daryl Beattie and Mick Doohan. Rainey ran away with it on a hot day with Dunlops.

== 500 cc classification ==
Pos.	Rider	Team	Manufacturer	Time/Retired	Grid	Points
1	(United States) Wayne Rainey	Marlboro Team Roberts	Yamaha	44:54.102	3	25
2	(Australia) Daryl Beattie	Rothmans Honda Team	Honda	+6.145	2	20
3	(United States) Kevin Schwantz	Lucky Strike Suzuki	Suzuki	+18.367	1	16
4	(Australia) Mick Doohan	Rothmans Honda Team	Honda	+20.973	5	13
5	(Spain) Àlex Crivillé	Marlboro Honda Pons	Honda	+21.715	4	11
6	(Japan) Shinichi Itoh	HRC Rothmans Honda	Honda	+29.770	6	10
7	(Brazil) Alex Barros	Lucky Strike Suzuki	Suzuki	+32.602	7	9
8	(United Kingdom) Niall Mackenzie	Valvoline Team WCM	ROC Yamaha	+1:04.514	9	8
9	(United States) Doug Chandler	Cagiva Team Agostini	Cagiva	+1:15.848	10	7
10	(Australia) Matthew Mladin	Cagiva Team Agostini	Cagiva	+1 Lap	11	6
11	(Belgium) Laurent Naveau	Euro Team	Yamaha	+1 Lap	17	5
12	(United Kingdom) John Reynolds	Padgett's Motorcycles	Harris Yamaha	+1 Lap	14	4
13	(Spain) Juan Lopez Mella	Lopez Mella Racing Team	ROC Yamaha	+1 Lap	13	3
14	(United Kingdom) Sean Emmett	Shell Team Harris	Harris Yamaha	+1 Lap	21	2
15	(Italy) Renato Colleoni	Team Elit	ROC Yamaha	+1 Lap	22	1
16	(Italy) Lucio Pedercini	Team Pedercini	ROC Yamaha	+1 Lap	24	
17	(Germany) Michael Rudroff	Rallye Sport	Harris Yamaha	+1 Lap	23	
18	(Switzerland) Serge David	Team ROC	ROC Yamaha	+1 Lap	15	
19	(Netherlands) Cees Doorakkers	Doorakkers Racing	Harris Yamaha	+1 Lap	25	
20	(France) Thierry Crine	Ville de Paris	ROC Yamaha	+1 Lap	27	
21	(Austria) Andreas Meklau	Austrian Racing Company	ROC Yamaha	+1 Lap	28	
22	(France) Bruno Bonhuil	MTD Objectif 500	ROC Yamaha	+1 Lap	26	
23	(Japan) Toshiyuki Arakaki	Team ROC	ROC Yamaha	+1 Lap	18	
24	(United Kingdom) Kevin Mitchell	MBM Racing	Harris Yamaha	+1 Lap	20	
25	(Switzerland) Jean Luc Romanens	Argus Racing Team	ROC Yamaha	+2 Laps	32	
26	(United States) Alan Scott	Team Harris	Harris Yamaha	+2 Laps	30	
Ret	(France) José Kuhn	Euromoto	ROC Yamaha	Retirement	19	
Ret	(Japan) Tsutomu Udagawa	Team Udagawa	ROC Yamaha	Retirement	29	
Ret	(France) Bernard Garcia	Yamaha Motor France	Yamaha	Retirement	12	
Ret	(Italy) Marco Papa	Librenti Corse	Librenti	Retirement	31	
DNS	(United Kingdom) Jeremy McWilliams	Millar Racing	Yamaha	Did not start		
DNS	(Italy) Luca Cadalora	Marlboro Team Roberts	Yamaha	Did not start		

== 250 cc classification ==
Pos.	Rider	Manufacturer	Time/Retired	Points
1	(Japan) Nobuatsu Aoki	Honda	42:36.014	25
2	(Japan) Tetsuya Harada	Yamaha	+0.327	20
3	(Japan) Tadayuki Okada	Honda	+4.155	16
4	(Italy) Doriano Romboni	Honda	+17.065	13
5	(United States) John Kocinski	Suzuki	+17.284	11
6	(Germany) Helmut Bradl	Honda	+28.439	10
7	(Italy) Loris Reggiani	Aprilia	+34.492	9
8	(Spain) Alberto Puig	Honda	+39.311	8
9	(Italy) Pierfrancesco Chili	Yamaha	+46.177	7
10	(Spain) Luis d'Antin	Honda	+56.627	6
11	(Switzerland) Adrian Bosshard	Honda	+1:00.545	5
12	(Italy) Loris Capirossi	Honda	+1:03.963	4
13	(Netherlands) Patrick van den Goorbergh	Aprilia	+1:05.482	3
14	(Austria) Andy Preining	Aprilia	+1:10.361	2
15	(Switzerland) Eskil Suter	Aprilia	+1:14.488	1
16	(France) Jean-Michel Bayle	Aprilia	+1:14.674	
17	(Italy) Max Biaggi	Honda	+1:15.699	
18	(Spain) Carlos Cardus	Honda	+1:22:831	
19	(France) Jean-Philippe Ruggia	Aprilia	+1:58.018	
20	(Netherlands) Jurgen van den Goorbergh	Aprilia	+1 Lap	
21	(Spain) Luis Carlos Maurel	Aprilia	+1 Lap	
22	(Germany) Bernd Kassner	Aprilia	+1 Lap	
23	(Switzerland) Bernard Haenggeli	Aprilia	+1 Lap	
24	(Malaysia) Shahrun Nizan	Yamaha	+1 Lap	
Ret	(Germany) Volker Bahr	Honda	Retirement	
Ret	(Italy) Massimo Pennacchioli	Honda	Retirement	
Ret	(Germany) Jochen Schmid	Yamaha	Retirement	
Ret	(France) Frédéric Protat	Aprilia	Retirement	
Ret	(Spain) Juan Borja	Honda	Retirement	
Ret	(Malaysia) Veng Kit Tong	Yamaha	Retirement	
Ret	(Italy) Gabriele Debbia	Honda	Retirement	
Ret	(Japan) Noboyuki Wakai	Suzuki	Retirement	
Ret	(Netherlands) Wilco Zeelenberg	Aprilia	Retirement	
DNS	(Italy) Alessandro Gramigni	Gilera	Did not start	
DNS	(Italy) Paolo Casoli	Gilera	Did not start	
DNS	(France) Jean-Pierre Jeandat	Aprilia	Did not start	

Previous race: 1993 Australian Grand Prix	FIM Grand Prix World Championship; 1993 season	Next race: 1993 Japanese Grand Prix
Previous race: 1992 Malaysian Grand Prix	Malaysian Grand Prix	Next race: 1994 Malaysian Grand Prix
