= 1992 South African motorcycle Grand Prix =

(South Africa) 1992 South African Grand Prix
Race details
- Race 13 of 13 races in the 1992 Grand Prix motorcycle racing season
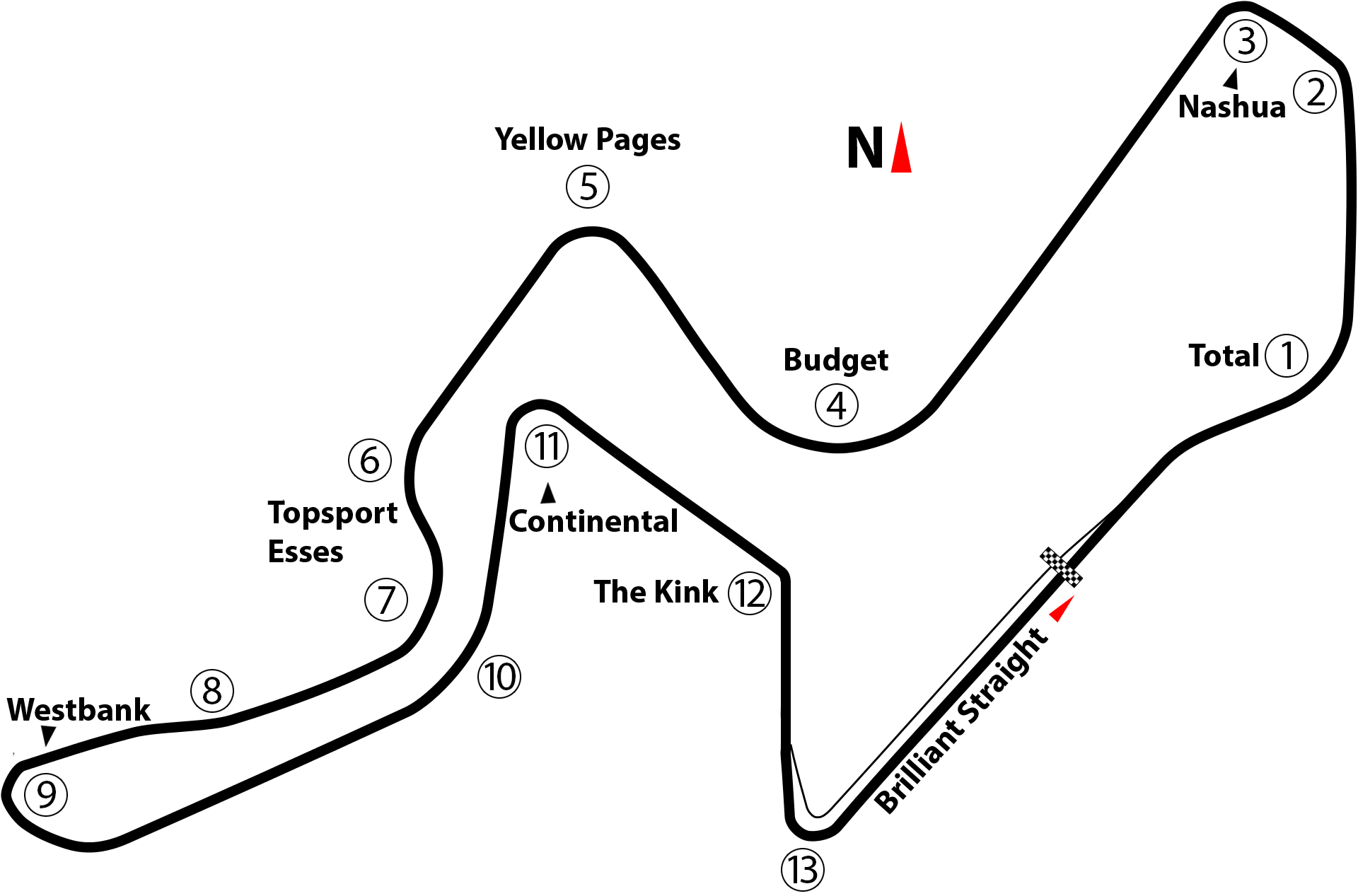
- Date: 6 September 1992
- Official name: Nashua South African Grand Prix
- Location: Kyalami
- Course: Permanent racing facility; 4.242 km (2.636 mi)

500cc
Pole position
- Rider: (United States) John Kocinski
- Time: 1:39.548
Fastest lap
- Rider: (Australia) Wayne Gardner
- Time: 1:39.952
Podium
- First: (United States) John Kocinski
- Second: (Australia) Wayne Gardner
- Third: (United States) Wayne Rainey

250cc
Pole position
- Rider: (Germany) Helmut Bradl
- Time: 1:42.056
Fastest lap
- Rider: (Italy) Max Biaggi
- Time: 1:42.094
Podium
- First: (Italy) Max Biaggi
- Second: (Italy) Loris Reggiani
- Third: (Italy) Pierfrancesco Chili

125cc
Pole position
- Rider: (Italy) Alessandro Gramigni
- Time: 1:48.869
Fastest lap
- Rider: (Spain) Carlos Giró
- Time: 1:48.687
Podium
- First: (Spain) Jorge Martínez
- Second: (Spain) Carlos Giró
- Third: (Italy) Alessandro Gramigni

The 1992 South African motorcycle Grand Prix was the last round of the 1992 Grand Prix motorcycle racing season. It took place on the weekend of 4–6 September 1992 at Kyalami, the first time the series had raced on the new circuit following the demolition of the classic layout in 1988 to redevelopment.

== 500 cc race ==
Eddie Lawson announced his retirement. To win the championship, Wayne Rainey had to finish in front of Mick Doohan and higher than 3rd if Doohan was directly behind. According to Scott, Kenny Roberts asked Rainey if he wanted John Kocinski's "help", and Rainey said no.

Kocinski on pole. Rainey gets the start from Kocinski, Doohan and Kevin Schwantz.

Doug Chandler moved into 3rd, Schwantz 4th, Doohan 5th.

Chandler makes it a 3-way fight for first with Rainey and teammate Kocinski.

Kocinski through to 1st, Wayne Gardner and Schwantz in a battle for 4th.

Kocinski gets a gap from Rainey, then it's a small gap to Gardner and Chandler.

Gardner closes on Rainey and passes into 2nd place. Gardner would much rather Rainey get the championship than Doohan, "so for once [Gardner] gave [Rainey] a whole lot of room as he went by."

Rainey's 3rd place is enough to win the championship by 4 points. Kocinski goes to Suzuki 250 GP next year, then is fired and goes to Cagiva.

== 500 cc classification ==
Pos.	Rider	Team	Manufacturer	Time/Retired	Points
1	(United States) John Kocinski	Marlboro Team Roberts	Yamaha	47:00.729	20
2	(Australia) Wayne Gardner	Rothmans Kanemoto Honda	Honda	+2.935	15
3	(United States) Wayne Rainey	Marlboro Team Roberts	Yamaha	+4.969	12
4	(United States) Doug Chandler	Lucky Strike Suzuki	Suzuki	+12.577	10
5	(United States) Kevin Schwantz	Lucky Strike Suzuki	Suzuki	+22.050	8
6	(Australia) Mick Doohan	Rothmans Honda Team	Honda	+30.313	6
7	(Spain) Àlex Crivillé	Campsa Honda Team	Honda	+33.870	4
8	(United Kingdom) Niall Mackenzie	Yamaha Motor Banco	Yamaha	+34.519	3
9	(Canada) Miguel Duhamel	Yamaha Motor Banco	Yamaha	+1:03.123	2
10	(Spain) Juan Garriga	Ducados Yamaha	Yamaha	+1:10.226	1
11	(Japan) Toshiyuki Arakaki	Team ROC Banco	ROC Yamaha	+1:25.031	
12	(Italy) Corrado Catalano	KCS International	ROC Yamaha	+1:25.041	
13	(Spain) Juan López Mella	Nivea For Men Team	ROC Yamaha	+1 Lap	
14	(South Africa) Russel Wood	Grant Nashua	Harris Yamaha	+1 Lap	
15	(South Africa) Mike Wilson	Ville de Paris	ROC Yamaha	+1 Lap	
16	(Italy) Marco Papa	Librenti Corse	Cagiva	+1 Lap	
17	(France) Dominique Sarron	Team ROC Banco	ROC Yamaha	+1 Lap	
18	(Republic of Ireland) Eddie Laycock	Milla Racing	Yamaha	+1 Lap	
19	(Germany) Michael Rudroff	Rallye Sport	Harris Yamaha	+1 Lap	
20	(Switzerland) Serge David	Team ROC Banco	ROC Yamaha	+1 Lap	
21	(Switzerland) Nicholas Schmassman	Uvex Racing Team	ROC Yamaha	+1 Lap	
22	(United Kingdom) Peter Graves	Peter Graves Racing Team	Harris Yamaha	+1 Lap	
23	(Luxembourg) Andreas Leuthe	VRP Racing Team	Harris Yamaha	+1 Lap	
24	(Austria) Josef Doppler	Uvex Racing Team	ROC Yamaha	+2 Laps	
Ret (25)	(Australia) Peter Goddard	Valvoline Team WCM	ROC Yamaha	Retirement	
Ret (26)	(Netherlands) Cees Doorakkers	HEK Racing Team	Harris Yamaha	Retirement	
Ret (27)	(United States) Eddie Lawson	Cagiva Team Agostini	Cagiva	Retirement	
Ret (28)	(United Kingdom) Damon Buckmaster	Padgett's Motorcycles	Harris Yamaha	Retirement	
Ret (29)	(United Kingdom) Kevin Mitchell	MBM Racing	Harris Yamaha	Retirement	
Ret (30)	(Brazil) Alex Barros	Cagiva Team Agostini	Cagiva	Retirement	
Ret (31)	(United States) Randy Mamola	Budweiser Team/Global Motorsports	Yamaha	Retirement	

== 250 cc classification ==
Pos	Rider	Manufacturer	Time/Retired	Points
1	(Italy) Max Biaggi	Aprilia	44:43.367	20
2	(Italy) Loris Reggiani	Aprilia	+4.587	15
3	(Italy) Pierfrancesco Chili	Aprilia	+9.749	12
4	(Germany) Helmut Bradl	Honda	+12.391	10
5	(Italy) Loris Capirossi	Honda	+17.244	8
6	(Italy) Luca Cadalora	Honda	+22.888	6
7	(Germany) Jochen Schmid	Yamaha	+30.931	4
8	(Spain) Herri Torrontegui	Suzuki	+34.666	3
9	(France) Jean-Philippe Ruggia	Gilera	+35.299	2
10	(Austria) Andy Preining	Aprilia	+55.278	1
11	(Japan) Masahiro Shimizu	Honda	+1.00.991	
12	(Switzerland) Eskil Suter	Aprilia	+1.03.895	
13	(Germany) Bernd Kassner	Aprilia	+1.04.091	
14	(Japan) Katsuyoshi Kozono	Honda	+1.08.817	
15	(Venezuela) Carlos Lavado	Gilera	+1.18.604	
16	(Netherlands) Jurgen van den Goorbergh	Aprilia	+1.21.618	
17	(South Africa) Martin Paetzold	Yamaha	+1.25.844	
18	(Switzerland) Yves Briguet	Honda	+1.28.561	
19	(Switzerland) Bernard Hänggeli	Aprilia	+1.28.652	
20	(Switzerland) Adrian Bosshard	Honda	+1.29.313	
21	(Italy) Renzo Colleoni	Aprilia	+1.29.581	
22	(Netherlands) Wilco Zeelenberg	Suzuki	+1.36.085	
23	(France) Bernard Cazade	Honda	+1.39.771	
24	(Netherlands) Patrick van den Goorbergh	Aprilia	+1.52.401	
25	(South Africa) Gavin Ramsay	Yamaha	+1 Lap	
26	(France) José Kuhn	Honda	+1 Lap	
Ret (27)	(France) Frédéric Protat	Aprilia	Retirement	
Ret (28)	(Italy) Michele Gallina	Yamaha	Retirement	
Ret (29)	(Spain) Luis d'Antin	Honda	Retirement	
Ret (30)	(Italy) Doriano Romboni	Honda	Retirement	
Ret (31)	(Germany) Adi Stadler	Aprilia	Retirement	
Ret (32)	(Germany) Harald Eckl	Aprilia	Retirement	
Ret (33)	(Italy) Paolo Casoli	Aprilia	Retirement	
Ret (34)	(Spain) Alberto Puig	Aprilia	Retirement	
Ret (35)	(Germany) Stefan Prein	Honda	Retirement	

Previous race: 1992 Brazilian Grand Prix	FIM Grand Prix World Championship; 1992 season	Next race: 1993 Australian Grand Prix
Previous race: 1985 South African Grand Prix	South African Grand Prix	Next race: 1999 South African Grand Prix
