= 1991 Italian motorcycle Grand Prix =

(Italy) 1991 Italian Grand Prix
Race details
- Race 5 of 15 races in the 1991 Grand Prix motorcycle racing season
- Date: 19 May 1991
- Official name: Gran Premio d'Italia
- Location: Circuito Internazionale Santa Monica
- Course: Permanent racing facility; 3.488 km (2.167 mi)

500cc
Pole position
Rider	(United States) Wayne Rainey	Yamaha
Time	1:16.191	
Fastest lap
Rider	(United States) Wayne Rainey	Yamaha
Time	1:15.892	
Podium
First	(Australia) Mick Doohan	Honda
Second	(United States) John Kocinski	Yamaha
Third	(United States) Eddie Lawson	Cagiva

250cc
Pole position
Rider	(Germany) Helmut Bradl	Honda
Time	1:18.679	
Fastest lap
Rider	(Italy) Luca Cadalora	Honda
Time	1:17.965	
Podium
First	(Italy) Luca Cadalora	Honda
Second	(Germany) Helmut Bradl	Honda
Third	(Italy) Pierfrancesco Chili	Aprilia

125cc
Pole position
Rider	(Italy) Fausto Gresini	Honda
Time	1:24.267	
Fastest lap
Rider	(Italy) Fausto Gresini	Honda
Time	1:23.436	
Podium
First	(Italy) Fausto Gresini	Honda
Second	(Italy) Loris Capirossi	Honda
Third	(Italy) Alessandro Gramigni	Aprilia

Sidecar (B2A)
Pole position
Rider	(Switzerland) Rolf Biland	LCR-ADM
Passenger	(Switzerland) Kurt Waltisperg	
Time	1:19.127	
Fastest lap
Rider	(United Kingdom) Steve Webster	Krauser
Passenger	(United Kingdom) Gavin Simmons	
Time	1:20.039	
Podium
First rider	(United Kingdom) Steve Webster	Krauser
First passenger	(United Kingdom) Gavin Simmons	
Second rider	(Netherlands) Egbert Streuer	LCR-Yamaha
Second passenger	(United Kingdom) Peter Essaff	
Third rider	(Switzerland) Paul Güdel	LCR-Krauser
Third passenger	(Switzerland) Charly Güdel	

The 1991 Italian motorcycle Grand Prix was the fifth race of the 1991 Grand Prix motorcycle racing season. It took place on the weekend of 17–19 May 1991 at the Circuito Internazionale Santa Monica.

== 500 cc classification ==
Pos.	Rider	Team	Manufacturer	Laps	Time	Grid	Points
1	(Australia) Michael Doohan	Rothmans Honda Team	Honda	36	46:27.037	5	20
2	(United States) John Kocinski	Marlboro Team Roberts	Yamaha	36	+8.677	2	17
3	(United States) Eddie Lawson	Cagiva Corse	Cagiva	36	+14.319	4	15
4	(Brazil) Alex Barros	Cagiva Corse	Cagiva	36	+23.151	7	13
5	(France) Jean-Philippe Ruggia	Sonauto Yamaha Mobil 1	Yamaha	36	+23.561	8	11
6	(United States) Doug Chandler	Roberts B Team	Yamaha	36	+28.135	6	10
7	(United States) Kevin Schwantz	Lucky Strike Suzuki	Suzuki	36	+28.480	3	9
8	(Spain) Juan Garriga	Ducados Yamaha	Yamaha	36	+48.073	10	8
9	(United States) Wayne Rainey	Marlboro Team Roberts	Yamaha	36	+1:11.518	1	7
10	(Republic of Ireland) Eddie Laycock	Millar Racing	Yamaha	35	+1 lap	12	6
11	(Italy) Marco Papa	Team Marco Papa	Honda	35	+1 lap	14	5
12	(Netherlands) Cees Doorakkers	HEK-Baumachines	Honda	34	+2 laps	15	4
13	(Italy) Romolo Balbi		Honda	34	+2 laps	13	3
14	(United Kingdom) Simon Buckmaster	Padgett's Racing Team	Suzuki	33	+3 laps		2
15	(Germany) Michael Rudroff	Rallye Sport	Honda	33	+3 laps		1
Ret	(Belgium) Didier de Radiguès	Lucky Strike Suzuki	Suzuki	29	Retired	9	
Ret	(France) Adrien Morillas	Sonauto Yamaha Mobil 1	Yamaha	29	Retired	11	
Ret	(Germany) Hans Becker	Team Romero Racing	Yamaha	25	Retired		
Ret	(Switzerland) Nicolas Schmassman	Schmassman Technotron	Honda	9	Retired		
DNQ	(Germany) Helmut Schutz	Rallye Sport	Honda		Did not qualify		
DNQ	(Germany) Andreas Leuthe	Librenti Corse	Honda		Did not qualify		
DNQ	(Venezuela) Larry Vacondio		Honda		Did not qualify		

== 250 cc classification ==
Pos	Rider	Manufacturer	Laps	Time	Grid	Points
1	(Italy) Luca Cadalora	Honda	30	39:29.951	2	20
2	(Germany) Helmut Bradl	Honda	30	+0.009	1	17
3	(Italy) Pierfrancesco Chili	Aprilia	30	+8.179	3	15
4	(Italy) Loris Reggiani	Aprilia	30	+8.186	5	13
5	(Netherlands) Wilco Zeelenberg	Honda	30	+14.795	7	11
6	(Spain) Carlos Cardús	Honda	30	+14.983	4	10
7	(Japan) Masahiro Shimizu	Honda	30	+33.909	8	9
8	(Germany) Jochen Schmid	Honda	30	+52.658	11	8
9	(Austria) Andreas Preining	Aprilia	30	+53.825	14	7
10	(Italy) Paolo Casoli	Yamaha	30	+1:03.005	13	6
11	(France) Jean-Pierre Jeandat	Honda	30	+1:04.911		5
12	(Finland) Erkka Korpiaho	Aprilia	30	+1:09.379		4
13	(Italy) Renzo Colleoni	Aprilia	30	+1:09.886		3
14	(Venezuela) Carlos Lavado	Yamaha	30	+1:17.145	12	2
15	(Germany) Stefan Prein	Honda	29	+1 lap		1
16	(Germany) Harald Eckl	Aprilia	29	+1 lap		
17	(Spain) Jaime Mariano	Aprilia	29	+1 lap		
18	(Switzerland) Urs Jucker	Yamaha	29	+1 lap		
19	(Germany) Martin Wimmer	Suzuki	29	+1 lap	10	
20	(Italy) Renato Colleoni	Aprilia	29	+1 lap		
21	(Netherlands) Patrick van der Goorbergh	Yamaha	29	+1 lap		
22	(Germany) Bernd Kassner	Honda	29	+1 lap		
23	(South Africa) Wayne Doran	Aprilia	29	+1 lap		
24	(France) Jean Foray	Yamaha	29	+1 lap		
Ret	(Italy) Corrado Catalano	Honda	26	Retired		
Ret	(Italy) Stefano Pennese	Aprilia	22	Retired		
Ret	(France) Frédéric Protat	Aprilia	19	Retired		
Ret	(Italy) Doriano Romboni	Honda	18	Retired	6	
Ret	(Italy) Fausto Ricci	Yamaha	18	Retired		
Ret	(Spain) Àlex Crivillé	JJ Cobas	15	Retired	9	
Ret	(Switzerland) Bernard Hänggeli	Aprilia	15	Retired	15	
Ret	(Spain) Alberto Puig	Yamaha	13	Retired		
Ret	(Italy) Marcellino Lucchi	Aprilia	13	Retired		
Ret	(United Kingdom) Ian Newton	Yamaha	8	Retired		
Ret	(Netherlands) Leon van der Heyden	Honda	1	Retired		

== 125 cc classification ==
Pos	Rider	Manufacturer	Laps	Time	Grid	Points
1	(Italy) Fausto Gresini	Honda	26	36:29.927	1	20
2	(Italy) Loris Capirossi	Honda	26	+18.493	2	17
3	(Italy) Alessandro Gramigni	Aprilia	26	+23.101	7	15
4	(Italy) Ezio Gianola	Derbi	26	+29.088	4	13
5	(Netherlands) Hans Spaan	Honda	26	+33.230	10	11
6	(Japan) Nobuyuki Wakai	Honda	26	+33.629	13	10
7	(Switzerland) Heinz Lüthi	Honda	26	+34.115	3	9
8	(Italy) Gabriele Debbia	Aprilia	26	+34.237	8	8
9	(Germany) Ralf Waldmann	Honda	26	+34.460	11	7
10	(Germany) Dirk Raudies	Honda	26	+35.230		6
11	(United Kingdom) Ian McConnachie	Honda	26	+42.905		5
12	(Germany) Adolf Stadler	JJ Cobas	26	+47.525	15	4
13	(Japan) Hisashi Unemoto	Honda	26	+54.431		3
14	(United Kingdom) Steve Patrickson	Honda	26	+1:00.339		2
15	(Finland) Johnny Wickström	Honda	26	+1:00.539		1
16	(Japan) Koji Takada	Honda	26	+1:06.139		
17	(Spain) Julián Miralles	JJ Cobas	26	+1:06.935		
18	(Italy) Serafino Foti	Honda	26	+1:07.493		
19	(Spain) Manuel Hernández	Honda	26	+1:08.123		
20	(Netherlands) Arie Molenaar	Honda	26	+1:08.427		
21	(France) Alain Bronec	Honda	26	+1:15.924		
22	(Switzerland) Thierry Feuz	Honda	26	+1:19.698		
23	(Spain) Francisco Debon	JJ Cobas	26	+1:19.849		
24	(Italy) Maurizio Vitali	Gazzaniga	25	+1 lap	12	
25	(Spain) Luis Alvaro	Derbi	25	+1 lap		
Ret	(Japan) Kinya Wada	Honda	25	Retired		
Ret	(Italy) Bruno Casanova	Honda	18	Retired	6	
Ret	(Germany) Peter Öttl	Rotax	17	Retired		
Ret	(Spain) Herri Torrontegui	JJ Cobas	15	Retired	14	
Ret	(Spain) Jorge Martínez	JJ Cobas	10	Retired	9	
Ret	(Japan) Noboru Ueda	Honda	8	Retired	5	
Ret	(Japan) Kazuto Sakata	Honda	5	Retired		
Ret	(Spain) Manuel Herreros	JJ Cobas	4	Retired		
Ret	(Germany) Alfred Waibel	Honda	4	Retired		
Ret	(Italy) Gimmi Bosio	Honda	0	Retired		
Ret	(Italy) Emilio Cuppini	Gazzaniga	0	Retired		
DNQ	(Netherlands) Jos van Dongen	Honda				
DNQ	(United Kingdom) Alan Patterson	Honda				
DNQ	(Germany) Stefan Kurfiss	Honda				
DNQ	(Switzerland) Stefan Bragger	Honda				
DNQ	(Netherlands) Hans Koopman	Honda				
DNQ	(United Kingdom) Robin Appleyard	Honda				
DNQ	(Australia) Peter Galvin	Honda				
DNQ	(Germany) Wolfgang Fritz	Honda				
DNQ	(Switzerland) René Dünki	Honda				
DNQ	(Germany) Hubert Abold	Honda				
DNQ	(Socialist Federal Republic of Yugoslavia) Janez Pintar	Honda				
DNQ	(Finland) Taru Rinne	Honda				

== Sidecar classification ==
Pos	Rider	Passenger	Manufacturer	Laps	Time/Retired	Grid	Points
1	(United Kingdom) Steve Webster	(United Kingdom) Gavin Simmons	Krauser	26	35:08.085	2	20
2	(Netherlands) Egbert Streuer	(United Kingdom) Peter Essaff	LCR-Yamaha	26	+14.440	5	17
3	(Switzerland) Paul Güdel	(Switzerland) Charly Güdel	LCR-Krauser	26	+26.431	13	15
4	(United Kingdom) Darren Dixon	(United Kingdom) Sean Dixon	LCR-Krauser	26	+30.300	10	13
5	(Japan) Yoshisada Kumagaya	(United Kingdom) Bryan Houghton	Krauser	26	+45.188	9	11
6	(United Kingdom) Barry Brindley	(United Kingdom) Grahame Rose	LCR-Yamaha	26	+50.688	14	10
7	(Japan) Masato Kumano	(Germany) Eckhart Rösinger	LCR-Yamaha	26	+50.943	8	9
8	(Germany) Ralph Bohnhorst	(Germany) Bruno Hiller	Bohnhorst	26	+57.003	7	8
9	(Switzerland) Alfred Zurbrügg	(Switzerland) Martin Zurbrügg	LCR-Yamaha	26	+1:08.810	6	7
10	(Netherlands) Theo van Kempen	(Netherlands) Jan Kuyt	LCR-Krauser	25	+1 lap		6
11	(Switzerland) René Progin	(United Kingdom) Gary Irlam	LCR	25	+1 lap		5
12	(Switzerland) Tony Wyssen	(Netherlands) Geral de Haas	LCR	25	+1 lap		4
13	(United Kingdom) Tony Baker	(United Kingdom) Simon Prior	LCR-Krauser	25	+1 lap		3
14	(Switzerland) Markus Bösiger	(Switzerland) Peter Markwalder	ADM	25	+1 lap		2
15	(Austria) Klaus Klaffenböck	(Austria) Christian Parzer	LCR	24	+2 laps	11	1
16	(Switzerland) Markus Egloff	(Switzerland) Urs Egloff	Yamaha	24	+2 laps	4	
Ret	(United Kingdom) Steve Abbott	(United Kingdom) Shaun Smith	LCR-Krauser	22	Retired	12	
Ret	(France) Alain Michel	(United Kingdom) Simon Birchall	Krauser	12	Retired	3	
Ret	(Switzerland) Rolf Biland	(Switzerland) Kurt Waltisperg	LCR-ADM	3	Retired	1	
Ret	(United Kingdom) Barry Smith	(United Kingdom) David Smith	Windle-ADM	2	Retired	15	
DNQ	(United Kingdom) Derek Brindley	(United Kingdom) Nick Roche	LCR				
DNQ	(United Kingdom) Kenny Howles	(Italy) C. Mugnari	Krauser				
DNQ	(Switzerland) Hans Hügli	(Switzerland) Adolf Hänni	LCR				
DNQ	(United Kingdom) Gary Thomas	(Netherlands) Michel van Puyvelde	Krauser				
DNQ	(Italy) Reiner Kosta	(Switzerland) Jurg Egli	Yamaha				
DNQ	(Germany) Frank Voigt	(Germany) Holger Voigt	Schuh-Spezial				
DNQ	(Germany) Werner Kraus	(Germany) Thomas Schröder	ADM				

Previous race: 1991 Spanish Grand Prix	FIM Grand Prix World Championship; 1991 season	Next race: 1991 German Grand Prix
Previous race: 1990 Nations Grand Prix	Italian Grand Prix	Next race: 1992 Italian Grand Prix
