= 1991 Spanish motorcycle Grand Prix =

(Spain) 1991 Spanish Grand Prix
Race details
- Race 4 of 15 races in the 1991 Grand Prix motorcycle racing season
- Date: 12 May 1991
- Official name: Gran Premio de España
- Location: Circuito de Jerez
- Course: Permanent racing facility; 4.218 km (2.621 mi)

500cc
Pole position
Rider	(United States) Wayne Rainey	Yamaha
Time	1:46.881	
Fastest lap
Rider	(United States) Wayne Rainey	Yamaha
Time	1:47.615	
Podium
First	(Australia) Michael Doohan	Honda
Second	(United States) John Kocinski	Yamaha
Third	(United States) Wayne Rainey	Yamaha

250cc
Pole position
Rider	(Germany) Helmut Bradl	Honda
Time	1:49.108	
Fastest lap
Rider	(Germany) Helmut Bradl	Honda
Time	1:50.002	
Podium
First	(Germany) Helmut Bradl	Honda
Second	(Italy) Luca Cadalora	Honda
Third	(Italy) Loris Reggiani	Aprilia

125cc
Pole position
Rider	(Japan) Noboru Ueda	Honda
Time	1:54.647	
Fastest lap
Rider	(Italy) Ezio Gianola	Derbi
Time	1:54.038	
Podium
First	(Japan) Noboru Ueda	Honda
Second	(Italy) Fausto Gresini	Honda
Third	(Italy) Loris Capirossi	Honda

Sidecar (B2A)
Pole position
Rider	(France) Alain Michel	Krauser
Passenger	(United Kingdom) Simon Birchall	
Time	1:50.817	
Fastest lap
Rider	(United Kingdom) Steve Webster	Krauser
Passenger	(United Kingdom) Gavin Simmons	
Time	1:52.237	
Podium
First rider	(United Kingdom) Steve Webster	Krauser
First passenger	(United Kingdom) Gavin Simmons	
Second rider	(Switzerland) Paul Güdel	LCR-Krauser
Second passenger	(Switzerland) Charly Güdel	
Third rider	(United Kingdom) Steve Abbott	LCR-Krauser
Third passenger	(United Kingdom) Shaun Smith	

The 1991 Spanish motorcycle Grand Prix was the fourth round of the 1991 Grand Prix motorcycle racing season. It took place on the weekend of 10–12 May 1991 at the Jerez circuit.

== 500 cc race report ==
Wayne Rainey’s 3rd pole in 4 races; takes turn 1 from Mick Doohan, John Kocinski, Eddie Lawson and Kevin Schwantz.

Rainey and Doohan get a little gap to Kocinski, then it's a large gap to 4th. Doohan starts to open a gap from Rainey, who starts to get pressure from his teammate Kocinski.

Kocinski passes Rainey without much finesse. Doohan wins with a large gap and Kocinski’s 2nd place takes 2 points from Rainey’s standing, so he's now 4 points behind Doohan.

Rainey says that his tire blistered and had to nurse it on the right-handers. Schwantz' Suzuki holed a piston while he was battling for 4th place.

== 500 cc classification ==
Pos.	Rider	Team	Manufacturer	Laps	Time	Grid	Points
1	(Australia) Mick Doohan	Rothmans Honda Team	Honda	29	52:42.650	3	20
2	(United States) John Kocinski	Marlboro Team Roberts	Yamaha	29	+9.920	2	17
3	(United States) Wayne Rainey	Marlboro Team Roberts	Yamaha	29	+13.463	1	15
4	(Spain) Juan Garriga	Ducados Yamaha	Yamaha	29	+34.955	6	13
5	(France) Jean-Philippe Ruggia	Sonauto Yamaha Mobil 1	Yamaha	29	+39.276	9	11
6	(United States) Eddie Lawson	Cagiva Corse	Cagiva	29	+46.684	5	10
7	(Australia) Wayne Gardner	Rothmans Honda Team	Honda	29	+53.944	7	9
8	(Belgium) Didier de Radiguès	Lucky Strike Suzuki	Suzuki	29	+55.155	10	8
9	(France) Adrien Morillas	Sonauto Yamaha Mobil 1	Yamaha	29	+1:11.117	11	7
10	(United States) Doug Chandler	Roberts B Team	Yamaha	29	+1:31.628	8	6
11	(Republic of Ireland) Eddie Laycock	Millar Racing	Yamaha	28	+1 lap	12	5
12	(Italy) Marco Papa	Team Marco Papa	Honda	28	+1 lap	13	4
13	(Netherlands) Cees Doorakkers	HEK-Baumachines	Honda	28	+1 lap	14	3
14	(Germany) Hans Becker	Team Romero Racing	Yamaha	27	+2 laps	15	2
15	(Germany) Michael Rudroff	Rallye Sport	Honda	27	+2 laps		1
Ret	(United States) Kevin Schwantz	Lucky Strike Suzuki	Suzuki	11	Retired	4	
Ret	(Switzerland) Niggi Schmassman	Schmassman Technotron	Honda	6	Retired		
DNQ	(Switzerland) Helmut Schutz	Rallye Sport	Honda		Did not qualify		
DNQ	(Germany) Martin Trosch	MT Racing	Honda		Did not qualify		
DNQ	(Germany) Andreas Leuthe	Librenti Corse	Suzuki		Did not qualify		

== 250 cc classification ==
Pos	Rider	Manufacturer	Laps	Time	Grid	Points
1	(Germany) Helmut Bradl	Honda	24	44:22.222	1	20
2	(Italy) Luca Cadalora	Honda	24	+0.451	2	17
3	(Italy) Loris Reggiani	Aprilia	24	+4.156	7	15
4	(Japan) Masahiro Shimizu	Honda	24	+6.285	3	13
5	(Italy) Pierfrancesco Chili	Aprilia	24	+6.793	4	11
6	(Spain) Carlos Cardús	Honda	24	+8.186	5	10
7	(Germany) Jochen Schmid	Honda	24	+37.638	13	9
8	(Germany) Martin Wimmer	Suzuki	24	+41.905	11	8
9	(Italy) Doriano Romboni	Honda	24	+46.974		7
10	(Spain) Alberto Puig	Yamaha	24	+49.647	12	6
11	(Venezuela) Carlos Lavado	Yamaha	24	+1:04.453	15	5
12	(France) Jean-Pierre Jeandat	Honda	24	+1:11.980		4
13	(Netherlands) Leon van der Heyden	Honda	24	+1:14.709		3
14	(Netherlands) Patrick van der Goorbergh	Yamaha	24	+1:17.124		2
15	(Switzerland) Urs Jucker	Yamaha	24	+1:25.505		1
16	(Spain) Jaime Mariano	Aprilia	24	+1:38.203		
17	(Switzerland) Bernard Hänggeli	Aprilia	24	+1:39.797		
18	(United Kingdom) Ian Newton	Yamaha	23	+1 lap		
19	(Italy) Fausto Ricci	Yamaha	23	+1 lap		
20	(France) Jean Foray	Yamaha	23	+1 lap		
Ret	(Finland) Erkka Korpiaho	Aprilia	21	Retired		
Ret	(Italy) Renzo Colleoni	Aprilia	16	Retired	14	
Ret	(Italy) Paolo Casoli	Yamaha	15	Retired	9	
Ret	(Italy) Corrado Catalano	Honda	9	Retired		
Ret	(Spain) Àlex Crivillé	JJ Cobas	7	Retired	8	
Ret	(Austria) Andreas Preining	Aprilia	6	Retired	10	
Ret	(France) Frédéric Protat	Aprilia	4	Retired		
Ret	(United Kingdom) Kevin Mitchell	Yamaha	4	Retired		
Ret	(Italy) Marcellino Lucchi	Aprilia	2	Retired		
Ret	(Netherlands) Wilco Zeelenberg	Honda	1	Retired	6	
Ret	(France) Dominique Sarron	Yamaha	1	Retired		
Ret	(Germany) Harald Eckl	Aprilia	1	Retired		
DNS	(Germany) Stefan Prein	Honda				

== 125 cc classification ==
Pos	Rider	Manufacturer	Laps	Time	Grid	Points
1	(Japan) Noboru Ueda	Honda	22	42:23.780	1	20
2	(Italy) Fausto Gresini	Honda	22	+0.987	3	17
3	(Italy) Loris Capirossi	Honda	22	+15.199	11	15
4	(Italy) Gabriele Debbia	Aprilia	22	+15.440	10	13
5	(Spain) Jorge Martínez	JJ Cobas	22	+15.860	2	11
6	(Italy) Bruno Casanova	Honda	22	+23.815	9	10
7	(Germany) Ralf Waldmann	Honda	22	+27.403	5	9
8	(Netherlands) Hans Spaan	Honda	22	+36.338	13	8
9	(Germany) Dirk Raudies	Honda	22	+36.422		7
10	(Spain) Manuel Herreros	JJ Cobas	22	+48.602		6
11	(Japan) Hisashi Unemoto	Honda	22	+53.170	14	5
12	(Spain) Herri Torrontegui	JJ Cobas	22	+53.521		4
13	(Germany) Adolf Stadler	JJ Cobas	22	+53.845	8	3
14	(Spain) Julián Miralles	JJ Cobas	22	+54.021		2
15	(Spain) Luis Alvaro	Derbi	22	+54.883	15	1
16	(Italy) Alessandro Gramigni	Aprilia	22	+54.930	12	
17	(Germany) Peter Öttl	Rotax	22	+58.183		
18	(United Kingdom) Steve Patrickson	Honda	22	+59.052		
19	(Netherlands) Arie Molenaar	Honda	22	+1:03.016		
20	(United Kingdom) Ian McConnachie	Honda	22	+1:04.666		
21	(Japan) Nobuyuki Wakai	Honda	22	+1:05.208		
22	(United Kingdom) Robin Appleyard	Honda	22	+1:12.692		
23	(Spain) Manuel Hernández	Honda	22	+1:18.821		
24	(France) Alain Bronec	Honda	22	+1:21.511		
25	(Spain) Javier Debon	JJ Cobas	22	+1:26.182		
26	(Netherlands) Jos van Dongen	Honda	22	+1:29.294		
27	(Australia) Peter Galvin	Honda	21	+1 lap		
Ret	(Italy) Ezio Gianola	Derbi	20	Retired	4	
Ret	(Italy) Emilio Cuppini	Gazzaniga	12	Retired		
Ret	(Switzerland) Thierry Feuz	Honda	10	Retired		
Ret	(Switzerland) Heinz Lüthi	Honda	6	Retired	7	
Ret	(Japan) Koji Takada	Honda	6	Retired		
Ret	(Germany) Alfred Waibel	Honda	3	Retired		
Ret	(Italy) Gimmi Bosio	Honda	1	Retired	6	
Ret	(Japan) Kazuto Sakata	Honda	0	Retired		
Ret	(Italy) Maurizio Vitali	Gazzaniga	0	Retired		
DNS	(Italy) Serafino Foti	Honda				
DNQ	(Switzerland) Stefan Bragger	Honda				
DNQ	(Netherlands) Hans Koopman	Honda				
DNQ	(Japan) Kinya Wada	Honda				
DNQ	(United Kingdom) Alan Patterson	Honda				
DNQ	(Germany) Stefan Kurfiss	Honda				
DNQ	(Germany) Hubert Abold	Honda				
DNQ	(Germany) Wolfgang Fritz	Honda				
DNQ	(Switzerland) René Dünki	Honda				
DNQ	(Finland) Taru Rinne	Honda				
DNQ	(Canada) Phillip Unhola	Honda				

== Sidecar classification ==
Pos	Rider	Passenger	Manufacturer	Laps	Time/Retired	Grid	Points
1	(United Kingdom) Steve Webster	(United Kingdom) Gavin Simmons	Krauser	22	41:53.700	2	20
2	(Switzerland) Paul Güdel	(Switzerland) Charly Güdel	LCR-Krauser	22	+4.062	4	17
3	(United Kingdom) Steve Abbott	(United Kingdom) Shaun Smith	LCR-Krauser	22	+4.380	5	15
4	(Switzerland) Rolf Biland	(Switzerland) Kurt Waltisperg	LCR-ADM	22	+4.594	3	13
5	(Japan) Yoshisada Kumagaya	(United Kingdom) Bryan Houghton	Krauser	22	+35.154	8	11
6	(Switzerland) Markus Egloff	(Switzerland) Urs Egloff	Yamaha	22	+50.510	6	10
7	(United Kingdom) Derek Brindley	(United Kingdom) Nick Roche	LCR	22	+53.098	12	9
8	(Germany) Ralph Bohnhorst	(Germany) Geral de Haas	LCR	22	+1:18.654		8
9	(Japan) Masato Kumano	(Germany) Eckhart Rösinger	LCR-Yamaha	22	+1:19.320		7
10	(Switzerland) Tony Wyssen	(Switzerland) Killian Wyssen	LCR-Krauser	22	+1:26.836	13	6
11	(Netherlands) Theo van Kempen	(Netherlands) Jan Kuyt	LCR-Krauser	22	+1:28.089	15	5
12	(Austria) Klaus Klaffenböck	(Austria) Christian Parzer	LCR	22	+1:50.872	14	4
13	(Germany) Werner Kraus	(Germany) Thomas Schröder	ADM	22	+1:58.758		3
14	(United Kingdom) Tony Baker	(United Kingdom) Simon Prior	LCR-Krauser	22	+1:58.834		2
15	(Switzerland) René Progin	(United Kingdom) Gary Irlam	LCR	21	+1 lap		1
16	(United Kingdom) Kenny Howles	(United Kingdom) Alan Langton	Krauser	21	+1 lap		
17	(Netherlands) Egbert Streuer	(United Kingdom) Peter Essaff	LCR-Yamaha	21	+1 lap	10	
18	(France) Alain Michel	(United Kingdom) Simon Birchall	Krauser	21	+1 lap	1	
19	(Sweden) Billy Gällros	(Sweden) Peter Berglund	Krauser	21	+1 lap		
20	(United Kingdom) Gary Thomas	(Netherlands) Michel van Puyvelde	Krauser	21	+1 lap		
21	(Switzerland) Alfred Zurbrügg	(Switzerland) Martin Zurbrügg	LCR-Yamaha	20	+2 laps	7	
Ret	(United Kingdom) Darren Dixon	(United Kingdom) Sean Dixon	LCR-Krauser	3	Retired	11	
Ret	(United Kingdom) Barry Brindley	(United Kingdom) Tony Atkinson	LCR-Yamaha	2	Retired	9	
Ret	(Switzerland) Markus Bösiger	(Germany) Bruno Hiler	ADM	1	Retired		
Ret	(United Kingdom) Barry Smith	(United Kingdom) David Smith	Windle-ADM	1	Retired		
DNQ	(Germany) Frank Voigt	(Germany) Holger Voigt	Schuh-Spezial				
DNQ	(Italy) Reiner Kosta	(Switzerland) Jurg Egli	Yamaha				

Previous race: 1991 United States Grand Prix	FIM Grand Prix World Championship; 1991 season	Next race: 1991 Italian Grand Prix
Previous race: 1990 Spanish Grand Prix	Spanish Grand Prix	Next race: 1992 Spanish Grand Prix
