= 1991 German motorcycle Grand Prix =

(Germany) 1991 German Grand Prix
Race details
- Race 6 of 15 races in the 1991 Grand Prix motorcycle racing season
- Date: 26 May 1991
- Official name: Großer Preis von Deutschland für Motorräder
- Location: Hockenheimring
- Course: Permanent racing facility; 6.788 km (4.218 mi)

500cc
Pole position
Rider	(Australia) Mick Doohan	Honda
Time	2:00.362	
Fastest lap
Rider	(United States) Kevin Schwantz	Suzuki
Time	1:59.846	
Podium
First	(United States) Kevin Schwantz	Suzuki
Second	(United States) Wayne Rainey	Yamaha
Third	(Australia) Mick Doohan	Honda

250cc
Pole position
Rider	(Germany) Helmut Bradl	Honda
Time	2:06.934	
Fastest lap
Rider	(Germany) Helmut Bradl	Honda
Time	2:06.725	
Podium
First	(Germany) Helmut Bradl	Honda
Second	(Spain) Carlos Cardús	Honda
Third	(Netherlands) Wilco Zeelenberg	Honda

125cc
Pole position
Rider	(Italy) Loris Capirossi	Honda
Time	2:20.304	
Fastest lap
Rider	(Italy) Loris Capirossi	Honda
Time	2:20.257	
Podium
First	(Germany) Ralf Waldmann	Honda
Second	(Italy) Loris Capirossi	Honda
Third	(Switzerland) Heinz Lüthi	Honda

Sidecar (B2A)
Pole position
Rider	(United Kingdom) Steve Webster	Krauser
Passenger	(United Kingdom) Gavin Simmons	
Time	2:10.006	
Fastest lap
Rider	(Netherlands) Egbert Streuer	LCR-Yamaha
Passenger	(United Kingdom) Peter Essaff	
Time	2:10.444	
Podium
First rider	(Germany) Ralph Bohnhorst	Bohnhorst
First passenger	(Germany) Bruno Hiller	
Second rider	(France) Alain Michel	Krauser
Second passenger	(United Kingdom) Simon Birchall	
Third rider	(Switzerland) Rolf Biland	LCR-ADM
Third passenger	(Switzerland) Kurt Waltisperg	

The 1991 German motorcycle Grand Prix was the sixth round of the 1991 Grand Prix motorcycle racing season. It took place on the weekend of 24–26 May 1991 at the Hockenheim circuit. This was the first motorcycle racing in Germany after the German reunification

== 500 cc race report ==
Mick Doohan was on pole, Wayne Rainey was 1 second back in 4th, with Eddie Lawson on the front row again on the ever-improving Cagiva.

Doohan took the lead at the start ahead from Rainey, Eddie Lawson and John Kocinski. Doohan and Rainey developed a small gap to Kevin Schwantz, Lawson and Wayne Gardner. In the stadium section, Rainey tried to go through the inside of Doohan, but going off the racing line proved too slippery and he had to sit-up and got Schwantz on his back wheel.

Rainey recovered his rhythm and passed Doohan, but Schwantz was closing. Kocinski crashed out. Doohan re-took the lead of the trio with Rainey and Schwantz.

Another Rainey/Doohan battle ended inconclusively when Rainey came alongside Doohan and pointed to Doohan’s back tire which was shedding chunks. Going into the stadium section, Schwantz took the lead and Doohan started dropping back.

Last lap: Rainey was in front of Schwantz. Schwantz stayed behind Rainey through the first chicane, trying to build momentum for a draft pass. He managed it and took the lead from Rainey.

It looked like Schwantz has made a tactical error, letting Rainey draft him on the last straight that leads into the stadium section. Rainey draft passed and prepared for the right turn, but Schwantz swung out from behind and performs a spectacular late-braking pass—the RGV was squirming from side-to-side and the back tire was hopping up and down leaving a dashed black line of rubber. Schwantz got it under control and made the turn, but Rainey wasn't giving up and tried to stay on Schwantz’ left as they headed to a left turn, but Schwantz had better drive coming out of the previous turn and got in front of Rainey and stayed there to the line.

After the race Rainey commentated: “... I thought I was pretty lucky that we beat Doohan there when he had a problem. That’s who I was racing for the championship.”

== 500 cc classification ==
Pos.	Rider	Team	Manufacturer	Laps	Time	Grid	Points
1	(United States) Kevin Schwantz	Lucky Strike Suzuki	Suzuki	18	+36:20.491	2	20
2	(United States) Wayne Rainey	Marlboro Team Roberts	Yamaha	18	+0.016	4	17
3	(Australia) Mick Doohan	Rothmans Honda Team	Honda	18	+8.944	1	15
4	(United States) Eddie Lawson	Cagiva Corse	Cagiva	18	+11.568	3	13
5	(Australia) Wayne Gardner	Rothmans Honda Team	Honda	18	+25.500	6	11
6	(Belgium) Didier de Radiguès	Lucky Strike Suzuki	Suzuki	18	+1:00.264	7	10
7	(Spain) Juan Garriga	Ducados Yamaha	Yamaha	18	+1:11.175	8	9
8	(France) Adrien Morillas	Sonauto Yamaha Mobil 1	Yamaha	18	+1:24.711	12	8
9	(United States) Doug Chandler	Roberts B Team	Yamaha	18	+1:41.466	10	7
10	(Republic of Ireland) Eddie Laycock	Millar Racing	Yamaha	17	+1 lap	13	6
11	(Netherlands) Cees Doorakkers	HEK-Baumachines	Honda	17	+1 lap	14	5
12	(Germany) Michael Rudroff	Rallye Sport	Honda	17	+1 lap	15	4
13	(Germany) Hans Becker	Team Romero Racing	Yamaha	17	+1 lap		3
14	(United Kingdom) Simon Buckmaster	Padgett's Racing Team	Suzuki	17	+1 lap		2
Ret	(United States) John Kocinski	Marlboro Team Roberts	Yamaha	8	Retired	5	
DNS	(France) Jean-Philippe Ruggia	Sonauto Yamaha Mobil 1	Yamaha		Did not start	9	
DNS	(Brazil) Alex Barros	Cagiva Corse	Cagiva		Did not start	11	
DNQ	(Austria) Josef Doppler	Doppler Racing	Honda		Did not qualify		
DNQ	(Germany) Helmut Schutz	Rallye Sport	Honda		Did not qualify		
DNQ	(Switzerland) Niggi Schmassman	Schmassman Technotron	Honda		Did not qualify		
DNQ	(Germany) Martin Trösch	MT Racing	Honda		Did not qualify		

== 250 cc classification ==
Pos	Rider	Manufacturer	Laps	Time	Grid	Points
1	(Germany) Helmut Bradl	Honda	15	31:59.456	1	20
2	(Spain) Carlos Cardús	Honda	15	+13.517	5	17
3	(Netherlands) Wilco Zeelenberg	Honda	15	+14.034	3	15
4	(Italy) Luca Cadalora	Honda	15	+23.707	9	13
5	(Japan) Masahiro Shimizu	Honda	15	+43.569	7	11
6	(Austria) Andreas Preining	Aprilia	15	+43.756	6	10
7	(Spain) Àlex Crivillé	JJ Cobas	15	+43.825	12	9
8	(Germany) Jochen Schmid	Honda	15	+43.960	8	8
9	(Germany) Martin Wimmer	Suzuki	15	+44.219	10	7
10	(Germany) Stefan Prein	Honda	15	+44.585	11	6
11	(Italy) Paolo Casoli	Yamaha	15	+45.081	13	5
12	(Germany) Harald Eckl	Aprilia	15	+47.530	14	4
13	(Italy) Doriano Romboni	Honda	15	+50.256	15	3
14	(France) Jean-Pierre Jeandat	Honda	15	+59.494		2
15	(Venezuela) Carlos Lavado	Yamaha	15	+1:04.087		1
16	(France) Dominique Sarron	Yamaha	15	+1:21.210		
17	(Germany) Bernd Kassner	Yamaha	15	+1:21.432		
18	(Italy) Fausto Ricci	Yamaha	15	+1:46.045		
19	(Netherlands) Patrick van der Goorbergh	Yamaha	15	+1:50.704		
20	(United Kingdom) Kevin Mitchell	Yamaha	15	+1:50.882		
21	(France) Jean Foray	Yamaha	15	+1:50.946		
22	(Italy) Marcellino Lucchi	Aprilia	15	+1:53.122		
23	(South Africa) Wayne Doran	Aprilia	15	+1:58.967		
24	(United Kingdom) Ian Newton	Yamaha	15	+2:09.344		
25	(Sweden) Peter Linden	Honda	14	+1 lap		
Ret	(Italy) Corrado Catalano	Honda	8	Retired		
Ret	(Switzerland) Bernard Hänggeli	Aprilia	7	Retired		
Ret	(Italy) Pierfrancesco Chili	Aprilia	6	Retired	2	
Ret	(Italy) Loris Reggiani	Aprilia	4	Retired	4	
Ret	(Italy) Renzo Colleoni	Aprilia	3	Retired		
Ret	(Switzerland) Urs Jucker	Yamaha	3	Retired		
Ret	(Spain) Jaime Mariano	Aprilia	1	Retired		
DNS	(Spain) Alberto Puig	Yamaha				
DNS	(France) Frédéric Protat	Aprilia				
DNS	(Netherlands) Leon van der Heyden	Honda				
DNS	(Finland) Erkka Korpiaho	Aprilia				
DNS	(Italy) Stefano Pennese	Aprilia				

== 125 cc classification ==
Pos	Rider	Manufacturer	Laps	Time	Grid	Points
1	(Germany) Ralf Waldmann	Honda	14	33:12.041	6	20
2	(Italy) Loris Capirossi	Honda	14	+0.288	1	17
3	(Switzerland) Heinz Lüthi	Honda	14	+1.343	5	15
4	(Italy) Gabriele Debbia	Aprilia	14	+1.549	8	13
5	(Italy) Alessandro Gramigni	Aprilia	14	+1.558	10	11
6	(Spain) Jorge Martínez	JJ Cobas	14	+3.893		10
7	(Germany) Alfred Waibel	Honda	14	+4.395	12	9
8	(Germany) Dirk Raudies	Honda	14	+4.503	3	8
9	(Japan) Nobuyuki Wakai	Honda	14	+22.679	14	7
10	(Japan) Kazuto Sakata	Honda	14	+22.682	4	6
11	(Spain) Luis Alvaro	Derbi	14	+22.958	13	5
12	(Netherlands) Hans Spaan	Honda	14	+34.926	9	4
13	(Italy) Maurizio Vitali	Gazzaniga	14	+38.459		3
14	(Japan) Kinya Wada	Honda	14	+38.754		2
15	(Finland) Johnny Wickström	Honda	14	+38.857		1
16	(Germany) Stefan Kurfiss	Honda	14	+39.281		
17	(Japan) Hisashi Unemoto	Honda	14	+39.536		
18	(Spain) Herri Torrontegui	JJ Cobas	14	+39.544		
19	(Switzerland) Thierry Feuz	Honda	14	+40.116		
20	(Netherlands) Jos van Dongen	Honda	14	+40.286		
21	(Switzerland) Stefan Brägger	Honda	14	+40.344		
22	(Netherlands) Arie Molenaar	Honda	14	+41.113		
23	(Italy) Gimmi Bosio	Honda	14	+41.381		
24	(Germany) Wolfgang Fritz	Honda	14	+58.364		
25	(Netherlands) Hans Koopman	Honda	14	+58.653		
26	(Switzerland) René Dünki	Honda	14	+58.659		
27	(United Kingdom) Ian McConnachie	Honda	14	+1:35.943		
Ret	(Germany) Adolf Stadler	JJ Cobas	12	Retired	7	
Ret	(Italy) Fausto Gresini	Honda	12	Retired	2	
Ret	(Spain) Manuel Herreros	JJ Cobas	10	Retired		
Ret	(United Kingdom) Robin Appleyard	Honda	10	Retired		
Ret	(Italy) Emilio Cuppini	Gazzaniga	8	Retired		
Ret	(Spain) Francisco Debon	JJ Cobas	7	Retired		
Ret	(Italy) Bruno Casanova	Honda	4	Retired		
Ret	(Spain) Julián Miralles	JJ Cobas	1	Retired		
Ret	(Germany) Peter Öttl	Rotax	0	Retired	11	
DNS	(Italy) Ezio Gianola	Derbi			15	
DNS	(Japan) Koji Takada	Honda				
DNQ	(United Kingdom) Steve Patrickson	Honda				
DNQ	(France) Alain Bronec	Honda				
DNQ	(Australia) Peter Galvin	Honda				
DNQ	(Spain) Manuel Hernández	Honda				
DNQ	(Switzerland) Olivier Petrucciani	Aprilia				
DNQ	(Italy) Serafino Foti	Honda				
DNQ	(United Kingdom) Alan Patterson	Honda				
DNQ	(Germany) Hubert Abold	Honda				
DNQ	(France) Jean-Claude Selini	Honda				
DNQ	(Germany) Thomas Engl	Honda				
DNQ	(Canada) Phillip Unhola	Honda				
DNQ	(Finland) Taru Rinne	Honda				

== Sidecar classification ==
Pos	Rider	Passenger	Manufacturer	Laps	Time/Retired	Grid	Points
1	(Germany) Ralph Bohnhorst	(Germany) Bruno Hiller	Bohnhorst	14	30:56.749	2	20
2	(France) Alain Michel	(United Kingdom) Simon Birchall	Krauser	14	+0.241	4	17
3	(Switzerland) Rolf Biland	(Switzerland) Kurt Waltisperg	LCR-ADM	14	+2.427	5	15
4	(Netherlands) Egbert Streuer	(United Kingdom) Peter Essaff	LCR-Yamaha	14	+10.363	3	13
5	(United Kingdom) Barry Brindley	(United Kingdom) Trevor Hopkinson	LCR-Yamaha	14	+10.989	11	11
6	(United Kingdom) Steve Abbott	(United Kingdom) Shaun Smith	LCR-Krauser	14	+11.214		10
7	(Switzerland) Markus Egloff	(Switzerland) Urs Egloff	Yamaha	14	+11.629	9	9
8	(United Kingdom) Darren Dixon	(United Kingdom) Sean Dixon	LCR-Krauser	14	+11.722	7	8
9	(Japan) Yoshisada Kumagaya	(United Kingdom) Bryan Houghton	Krauser	14	+19.850	14	7
10	(Japan) Masato Kumano	(Germany) Eckhart Rösinger	LCR-Yamaha	14	+28.059	10	6
11	(Austria) Klaus Klaffenböck	(Austria) Christian Parzer	LCR	14	+28.533	12	5
12	(Netherlands) Theo van Kempen	(Netherlands) Jan Kuyt	LCR-Krauser	14	+55.021		4
13	(Germany) Werner Kraus	(Germany) Thomas Schröder	ADM	14	+1:11.940	15	3
14	(United Kingdom) Barry Smith	(United Kingdom) David Smith	Windle-ADM	14	+1:12.437		2
15	(France) Ivan Nigrowsky	(France) Nicolas Barillon	LCR	14	+1:13.169		1
16	(United Kingdom) Gary Thomas	(Netherlands) Michel van Puyvelde	Krauser	14	+1:35.782		
17	(United Kingdom) Tony Baker	(United Kingdom) Simon Prior	LCR-Krauser	13	+1 lap		
18	(Switzerland) Alfred Zurbrügg	(Switzerland) Martin Zurbrügg	LCR-Yamaha	1	+3 laps	13	
Ret	(Switzerland) Paul Güdel	(Switzerland) Charly Güdel	LCR-Krauser	13	Retired	6	
Ret	(United Kingdom) Steve Webster	(United Kingdom) Gavin Simmons	Krauser	9	Retired	1	
Ret	(Switzerland) Tony Wyssen	(Switzerland) Killian Wyssen	LCR-Krauser	3	Retired	8	
Ret	(Switzerland) René Progin	(United Kingdom) Gary Irlam	LCR	1	Retired		
DNQ	(Switzerland) Markus Bösiger	(Switzerland) Peter Markwalder	ADM				
Ret	(United Kingdom) Mark Reddington	(United Kingdom) Robert Parker	Krauser				
DNQ	(Netherlands) Jos van Stekelenburg	(Netherlands) Rinie Bettgens	LCR				
DNQ	(Switzerland) Hans Hügli	(Switzerland) Adolf Hänni	LCR				
DNQ	(Germany) Frank Voigt	(Germany) Holger Voigt	Schuh-Spezial				
DNQ	(Italy) Reiner Kosta	(Switzerland) Jurg Egli	Yamaha				
DNQ	(Germany) Bernd Scherer	(Germany) Peter Höss	LCR				

Previous race: 1991 Italian Grand Prix	FIM Grand Prix World Championship; 1991 season	Next race: 1991 Austrian Grand Prix
Previous race: 1990 German Grand Prix	German Grand Prix	Next race: 1992 German Grand Prix
