= Alessandro Gramigni =

Italian motorcycle racer (born 1968)

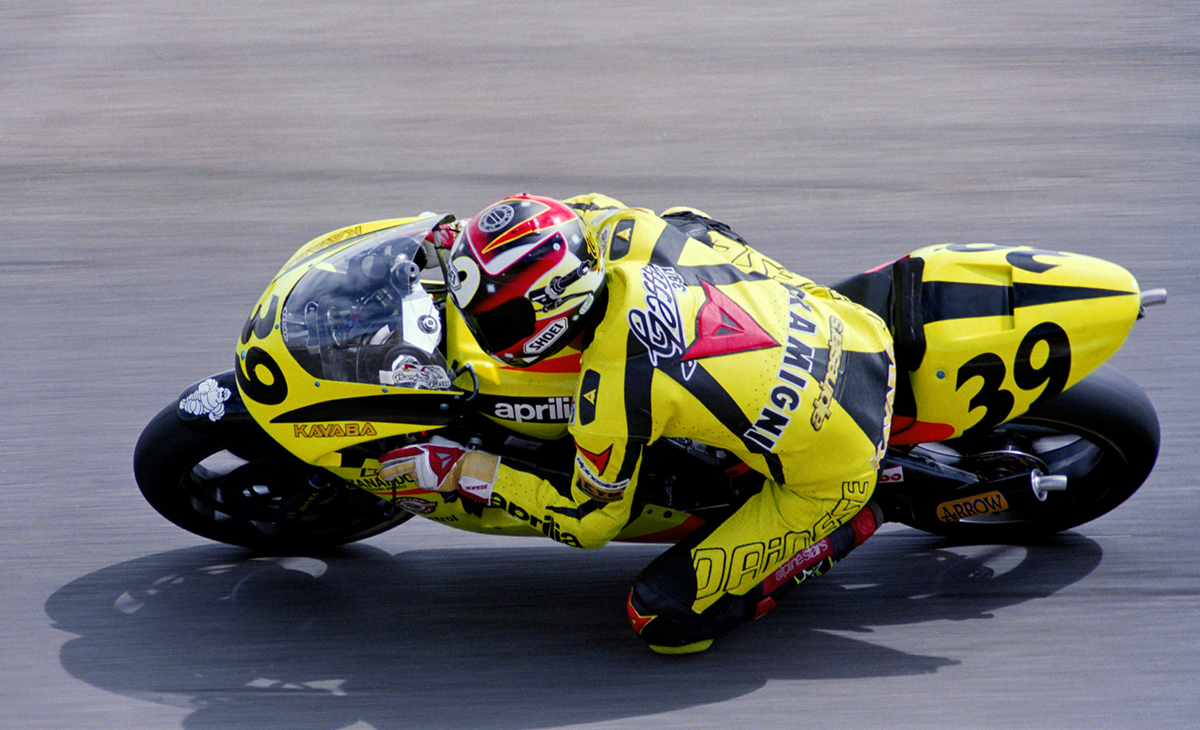
- Gramigni at the 1994 United States Grand Prix
- Nationality: Italian
Motorcycle racing career statistics
Grand Prix motorcycle racing
Active years	1990 - 1995, 1997
First race	1990 125cc Spanish Grand Prix
Last race	1997 500cc Malaysian Grand Prix
First win	1991 125cc Czechoslovak Grand Prix
Last win	1992 125cc Hungarian Grand Prix
Team(s)	Aprilia, Gilera
Championships	125cc - 1992
Starts / Wins / Podiums / Poles / F. laps / Points; 66 / 3 / 12 / 3 / 0 / 331
Superbike World Championship
Active years	1996, 1998 - 2001, 2003, 2005
Manufacturers	Ducati, Yamaha
Championships	0
2005 championship position	NC (0 pts)
Starts / Wins / Podiums / Poles / F. laps / Points; 87 / 0 / 0 / 0 / 0 / 193

Alessandro Gramigni (born 29 December 1968) is an Italian former professional motorcycle racer. He competed in Grand Prix motorcycle racing from 1990 to 1997 and in the Superbike World Championship from 1998 to 2003. Gramigni is notable for winning the 1992 F.I.M. 125cc world championship.

== Career ==
Gramigni was born in Florence, Italy. After a succession of good results as an amateur, he made his Grand Prix debut in 1990 riding an Aprilia in the 125cc Class, ending the season in ninth position. He won his first race at the 1991 Czechoslovak Grand Prix and finished the season ranked seventh in the championship with 90 points. His victory in Czechoslovakia also marked the first Grand Prix victory in world championship competition for the Aprilia factory.

In the 1992 season, Gramigni started very well, as after three Grands Prix, he had won at Shah Alam in Malaysia and was among the top of the standings but before the race in Spain he had a road accident, a car hit him while he was riding an enduro motorbike causing him a fracture of the tibia and fibula with involvement of the ligaments in his foot. Thanks to Doctor Claudio Costa and the Mobile Clinic he managed to get back on the bike for the Italian Grand Prix at Mugello, 19 days after the accident, with a cast on his foot covered in leather and coloured like a boot. He finished eleventh but it gave him confidence for the following Grands Prix. A week later, still in the cast, he raced in the European Grand Prix finishing fourth, in the following tests he finished seventh, third and first at the Hungary GP. While the other contenders for the Hondas had their ups and downs, he remained consistent in his results, with three podium finishes in the last three races, managing to become the World Champion of the 125cc class by 16 points more than the second-placed Italian, Fausto Gresini. With this world championship success for Gramigni, Aprilia obtains the first title in its history in the world championship.

Gramigni then moved up to the 250cc class in next season, first with the Gilera team before switching back to Aprilia. It was a disappointing season, as he scored only two points. He competed two more seasons in the 250 class, 1994 with the Aprilia, and in 1995 with Honda. After a two-year sabbatical, he entered one race in the 500cc class at the 1997 Malaysian Grand Prix before ending his Grand Prix career.

Gramigni turned his attention to the Superbike World Championship from 1998 to 2001 and then in 2003 and 2005. In 2004, he won the Italian Superbike Championship with the Yamaha Team 391 Racing team.

== Career statistics ==
=== Grand Prix motorcycle racing ===
==== Races by year ====
(key) (Races in bold indicate pole position, races in italics indicate fastest lap)

Year	Class	Bike	1	2	3	4	5	6	7	8	9	10	11	12	13	14	15	Pos	Pts
1990	125cc	Aprilia	JPN	SPA; 24	NAT; 22	GER; 7	AUT; 8	YUG; 9	NED; 10	BEL; 22	FRA; 9	GBR; Ret	SWE; 2	TCH; 3	HUN; 8	AUS; 9		9th	84
1991	125cc	Aprilia	JPN; 25	AUS; 8	SPA; 16	ITA; 3	GER; 5	AUT; 11	EUR; 17	NED; 3	FRA; 12	GBR; 15	RSM; 5	TCH; 1	MAL			7th	90
1992	125cc	Aprilia	JPN; 6	AUS; 2	**MAL**; 1	SPA; DNS	ITA; 11	EUR; 4	GER; 7	NED; 3	**HUN**; 1	FRA; 5	GBR; 2	BRA; 3	**RSA**; 3			**1st**	**134**
1993	250cc	Gilera	AUS; Ret	MAL; Ret	JPN; 18	SPA; Ret	AUT; 18	GER; 24	NED; Ret	EUR; Ret	RSM; 14	GBR; 16	CZE	ITA; Ret	USA	FIM		30th	2
1994	250cc	Aprilia	AUS; 17	MAL; 10	JPN; Ret	SPA; 17	AUT; 15	GER; 17	NED; DNS	ITA; 13	FRA; Ret	GBR; Ret	CZE; Ret	USA; Ret	ARG; Ret	EUR; Ret		23rd	10
1995	250cc	Honda	AUS	MAL	JPN	SPA; 14	GER	ITA; Ret	NED; 8	FRA; 15	GBR	CZE	BRA	ARG	EUR; Ret			23rd	11
1997	500cc	Aprilia	MAL; Ret	JPN	SPA	ITA	AUT	FRA	NED	IMO	GER	BRA	GBR	CZE	CAT	INA	AUS	NC	0

=== Superbike World Championship ===
==== Races by year ====
(key) (Races in bold indicate pole position) (Races in italics indicate fastest lap)

Year	Bike	1		2		3		4		5		6		7		8		9		10		11		12		13		Pos	Pts
Year	Bike	R1	R2	R1	R2	R1	R2	R1	R2	R1	R2	R1	R2	R1	R2	R1	R2	R1	R2	R1	R2	R1	R2	R1	R2	R1	R2	Pos	Pts
1996	Ducati	SMR	SMR	GBR	GBR	GER	GER	ITA	ITA	CZE	CZE	USA; Ret	USA; Ret	EUR	EUR	INA	INA	JPN	JPN	NED	NED	SPA	SPA	AUS	AUS			NC	0
1998	Ducati	AUS; 18	AUS; 15	GBR; 18	GBR; 17	ITA; 12	ITA; 13	SPA; 8	SPA; Ret	GER; 10	GER; Ret	SMR; 11	SMR; 12	RSA; 11	RSA; 14	USA; 16	USA; 9	EUR; 15	EUR; Ret	AUT; 13	AUT; 14	NED; 11	NED; Ret	JPN	JPN			14th	56
1999	Yamaha	RSA; 15	RSA; 17	AUS	AUS	GBR; 17	GBR; 14	SPA; 14	SPA; 14	ITA; Ret	ITA; 12	GER; 12	GER; 17	SMR; Ret	SMR; 13	USA; 15	USA; 15	EUR; 17	EUR; Ret	AUT; 8	AUT; Ret	NED; 15	NED; 14	GER; 12	GER; 14	JPN	JPN	19th	37
2000	Yamaha	RSA; 17	RSA; 14	AUS	AUS	JPN	JPN	GBR; 16	GBR; 15	ITA; 16	ITA; Ret	GER; 16	GER; 19	SMR; 12	SMR; 15	SPA; 19	SPA; 14	USA	USA	GBR; 16	GBR; 11	NED; 14	NED; 6	GER; 11	GER; 11	GBR; Ret	GBR; 11	22nd	42
2001	Yamaha	SPA	SPA	RSA	RSA	AUS	AUS	JPN	JPN	ITA; 12	ITA; 10	GBR	GBR	GER	GER	SMR; 15	SMR; 12	USA	USA	GBR	GBR	GER	GER	NED	NED	ITA; 15	ITA; 11	23rd	21
2003	Yamaha	SPA; Ret	SPA; DNS	AUS	AUS	JPN	JPN	ITA; 11	ITA; 11	GER	GER	GBR	GBR	SMR; 12	SMR; 15	USA	USA	GBR; 16	GBR; 11	NED; 11	NED; 15	ITA; 13	ITA; 12	FRA; Ret	FRA; 12			19th	37
2005	Yamaha	QAT	QAT	AUS	AUS	SPA	SPA	ITA	ITA	EUR	EUR	SMR	SMR	CZE	CZE	GBR	GBR	NED	NED	GER	GER	ITA; Ret	ITA; C	FRA	FRA			NC	0

=== CIV Superbike Championship ===
==== Races by year ====
(key) (Races in bold indicate pole position; races in italics indicate fastest lap)

Year	Bike	1	2	3	4	5	6	Pos	Pts
2001	Yamaha	MIS1	MON	VAL; 2	MIS2	MIS3		12th	20
2003	Yamaha	MIS1; 14	MUG1	MIS1	MUG2	VAL		26th	2
2004	Yamaha	**MUG**; 2	IMO; 2	VAL1; 2	MIS; 2	VAL2; 1		1st	105
2005	Yamaha	VAL; Ret	MON; 2	IMO; DNS	MIS1; Ret	MUG; 2	**MIS2**; 4	5th	53
