= 1994 Argentine motorcycle Grand Prix =

(Argentina) 1994 Argentine Grand Prix
Race details
- Race 13 of 14 races in the 1994 Grand Prix motorcycle racing season
- Date: 25 September 1994
- Official name: Grand Prix Marlboro
- Location: Autódromo Juan y Oscar Gálvez
- Course: Permanent racing facility; 4.350 km (2.703 mi)

MotoGP
Pole position
- Rider: (United States) John Kocinski
- Time: 1:45.346
Fastest lap
- Rider: (Australia) Mick Doohan
- Time: 1:46.270
Podium
- First: (Australia) Mick Doohan
- Second: (United States) Doug Chandler
- Third: (United States) John Kocinski

250cc
Pole position
- Rider: (Italy) Loris Capirossi
- Time: 1:47.576
Fastest lap
- Rider: (Japan) Tetsuya Harada
- Time: 1:47.336
Podium
- First: (Japan) Tadayuki Okada
- Second: (Italy) Max Biaggi
- Third: (Japan) Tetsuya Harada

125cc
Pole position
- Rider: (Japan) Noboru Ueda
- Time: 1:52.688
Fastest lap
- Rider: (Italy) Stefano Perugini
- Time: 1:52.268
Podium
- First: (Spain) Jorge Martínez
- Second: (Japan) Noboru Ueda
- Third: (Italy) Stefano Perugini

The 1994 Argentine motorcycle Grand Prix was the penultimate round of the 1994 Grand Prix motorcycle racing season. It took place on 25 September 1994 at the Autódromo Oscar Alfredo Gálvez in Buenos Aires.

== 500 cc classification ==
Pos.	Rider	Team	Manufacturer	Time/Retired	Points
1	(Australia) Mick Doohan	Honda Team HRC	Honda	48:12.812	25
2	(United States) Doug Chandler	Cagiva Team Agostini	Cagiva	+8.742	20
3	(United States) John Kocinski	Cagiva Team Agostini	Cagiva	+16.969	16
4	(Japan) Shinichi Itoh	Honda Team HRC	Honda	+28.281	13
5	(Spain) Alberto Puig	Ducados Honda Pons	Honda	+32.390	11
6	(Italy) Luca Cadalora	Marlboro Team Roberts	Yamaha	+40.069	10
7	(Spain) Àlex Crivillé	Honda Team HRC	Honda	+41.242	9
8	(Brazil) Alex Barros	Lucky Strike Suzuki	Suzuki	+43.050	8
9	(United Kingdom) Jeremy McWilliams	Millar Racing	Yamaha	+56.749	7
10	(United Kingdom) Sean Emmett	Lucky Strike Suzuki	Suzuki	+58.171	6
11	(United Kingdom) Niall Mackenzie	Slick 50 Team WCM	ROC Yamaha	+1:12.954	5
12	(France) Bernard Garcia	Yamaha Motor France	ROC Yamaha	+1:20.205	4
13	(France) Marc Garcia	DR Team Shark	ROC Yamaha	+1:40.197	3
14	(Belgium) Laurent Naveau	Euro Team	ROC Yamaha	+1:41.634	2
15	(United Kingdom) Neil Hodgson	Shell Harris Grand Prix	Harris Yamaha	+1:41.970	1
16	(Italy) Cristiano Migliorati	Team Pedercini	ROC Yamaha	+1:44.146	
17	(Italy) Lucio Pedercini	Team Pedercini	ROC Yamaha	+1 Lap	
18	(Netherlands) Cees Doorakkers	Team Doorakkers	Harris Yamaha	+1 Lap	
19	(Switzerland) Bernard Haenggeli	Haenggeli Racing	ROC Yamaha	+1 Lap	
20	(Argentina) Nestor Amoroso	Yamasur	Harris Yamaha	+1 Lap	
Ret	(Chile) Felipe Horta	Felipe Horta	Harris Yamaha	Retirement	
Ret	(Italy) Vittorio Scatola	Team Paton	Paton	Retirement	
Ret	(Luxembourg) Andreas Leuthe	Team Doppler Austria	ROC Yamaha	Retirement	
Ret	(United Kingdom) Kevin Mitchell	MBM Racing	Harris Yamaha	Retirement	
Ret	(France) Bruno Bonhuil	MTD Objectif 500	ROC Yamaha	Retirement	
Ret	(France) Jean Foray	Jean Foray Racing Team	ROC Yamaha	Retirement	
Ret	(United Kingdom) John Reynolds	Padgett's Motorcycles	Harris Yamaha	Retirement	
Ret	(France) Jean Pierre Jeandat	JPJ Racing	ROC Yamaha	Retirement	
Ret	(Italy) Marco Papa	Team Elit	ROC Yamaha	Retirement	
Ret	(Australia) Daryl Beattie	Marlboro Team Roberts	Yamaha	Retirement	
DNS	(Spain) Juan Lopez Mella	Lopez Mella Racing Team	ROC Yamaha	Did not start	

== 250 cc classification ==
Pos	Rider	Manufacturer	Time/Retired	Points
1	(Japan) Tadayuki Okada	Honda	45:09.167	25
2	(Italy) Max Biaggi	Aprilia	+5.283	20
3	(Japan) Tetsuya Harada	Yamaha	+5.603	16
4	(France) Jean Philippe Ruggia	Aprilia	+6.513	13
5	(Italy) Loris Capirossi	Honda	+13.867	11
6	(United States) Kenny Roberts Jr	Yamaha	+19.601	10
7	(France) Jean-Michel Bayle	Aprilia	+19.782	9
8	(Germany) Ralf Waldmann	Honda	+21.911	8
9	(Spain) Luis D'Antin	Honda	+28.758	7
10	(Spain) Carlos Checa	Honda	+29.735	6
11	(Netherlands) Wilco Zeelenberg	Honda	+49.183	5
12	(Switzerland) Adrien Bosshard	Honda	+50.185	4
13	(Spain) Juan Borja	Honda	+50.290	3
14	(Italy) Giuseppe Fiorillo	Honda	+1:01.925	2
15	(Spain) José Luis Cardoso	Aprilia	+1:04.593	1
16	(Spain) Luis Maurel	Honda	+1:13.199	
17	(France) Frederic Protat	Honda	+1:13.480	
18	(Germany) Adolf Stadler	Honda	+1:22.501	
19	(Switzerland) Eskil Suter	Aprilia	+1:24.839	
20	(Germany) Jürgen Fuchs	Honda	+1:36.375	
21	(Japan) Nobuatsu Aoki	Honda	+1:40.904	
22	(United Kingdom) James Haydon	Honda	+1 Lap	
23	(Finland) Krisse Kaas	Yamaha	+1 Lap	
24	(Brazil) Sergio Granton	Yamaha	+1 Lap	
25	(Spain) Manuel Hernandez	Aprilia	+1 Lap	
Ret	(Netherlands) Jurgen vd Goorbergh	Aprilia	Retirement	
Ret	(Austria) Andreas Preining	Aprilia	Retirement	
Ret	(Venezuela) Luis Lavado	Yamaha	Retirement	
Ret	(France) Chrisrian Boudinot	Aprilia	Retirement	
Ret	(Netherlands) Patrick vd Goorbergh	Aprilia	Retirement	
Ret	(Spain) Enrique de Juan	Aprilia	Retirement	
Ret	(Canada) Rodney Fee	Honda	Retirement	
Ret	(France) Noel Ferro	Honda	Retirement	
Ret	(Italy) Alessandro Gramigni	Aprilia	Retirement	

== 125 cc classification ==
Pos	Rider	Manufacturer	Time/Retired	Points
1	(Spain) Jorge Martínez	Yamaha	43:37.568	25
2	(Japan) Noboru Ueda	Honda	+0.376	20
3	(Italy) Stefano Perugini	Aprilia	+1.344	16
4	(Italy) Gianluigi Scalvini	Aprilia	+3.114	13
5	(Spain) Emilio Alzamora	Honda	+3.643	11
6	(Germany) Dirk Raudies	Honda	+14.007	10
7	(Japan) Takeshi Tsujimura	Honda	+16.079	9
8	(Japan) Masaki Tokudome	Honda	+26.443	8
9	(Japan) Kazuto Sakata	Aprilia	+26.710	7
10	(Spain) Carlos Giro	Aprilia	+26.858	6
11	(Germany) Stefan Prein	Yamaha	+27.642	5
12	(Japan) Haruchika Aoki	Honda	+27.733	4
13	(Germany) Peter Öttl	Aprilia	+28.670	3
14	(Japan) Akira Saito	Honda	+54.782	2
15	(Spain) Enrique Maturana	Yamaha	+55.406	1
16	(Switzerland) Olivier Petrucciani	Aprilia	+1:09.914	
17	(Italy) Max Gambino	Aprilia	+1:16.891	
18	(Austria) Manfred Baumann	Yamaha	+1:41.084	
19	(Argentina) Pablo Zeballos	Honda	+1 Lap	
Ret	(Germany) Maik Stief	Aprilia	Retirement	
Ret	(Netherlands) Loek Bodelier	Honda	Retirement	
Ret	(Argentina) Sebastián Porto	Aprilia	Retirement	
Ret	(France) Frédéric Petit	Yamaha	Retirement	
Ret	(Japan) Hideyuki Nakajo	Honda	Retirement	
Ret	(Japan) Tomoko Igata	Honda	Retirement	
Ret	(Italy) Lucio Cecchinello	Honda	Retirement	
Ret	(Germany) Manfred Geissler	Aprilia	Retirement	
Ret	(Italy) Vittorio Lopez	Honda	Retirement	
Ret	(Netherlands) Hans Spaan	Honda	Retirement	
Ret	(Germany) Oliver Koch	Honda	Retirement	
Ret	(Japan) Katsuyoshi Takahashi	Honda	Retirement	
Ret	(France) Nicolas Dussauge	Honda	Retirement	
Ret	(United Kingdom) Darren Barton	Honda	Retirement	
Ret	(Italy) Fausto Gresini	Honda	Retirement	
Ret	(Italy) Gabriele Debbia	Honda	Retirement	

Previous race: 1994 United States Grand Prix	FIM Grand Prix World Championship; 1994 season	Next race: 1994 European Grand Prix
Previous race: 1987 Argentine Grand Prix	Argentine Grand Prix	Next race: 1995 Argentine Grand Prix
