= Hans Spaan =

Dutch motorcycle racer

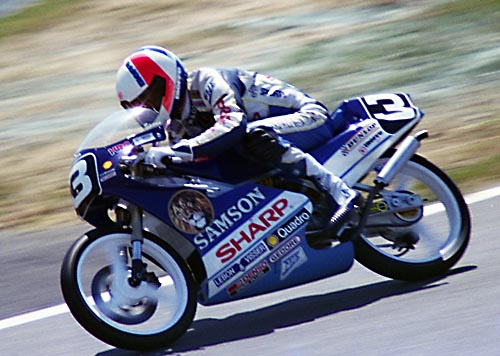
- Spaan at the 1989 Japanese Grand Prix.
- Nationality: Dutch
Motorcycle racing career statistics
Grand Prix motorcycle racing
| Active years | 1980, 1982 - 1994 |
| First race | 1980 50cc Dutch TT |
| Last race | 1994 125cc European Grand Prix |
| First win | 1989 125cc Austrian Grand Prix |
| Last win | 1990 125cc Czechoslovak Grand Prix |
| Team | Honda |
| Championships | 0 |
Starts / Wins / Podiums / Poles / F. laps / Points; 133 / 9 / 21 / 9 / 5 / 715

Hans Spaan (born 24 December 1958, in Castricum) is a Dutch former Grand Prix motorcycle road racer from the Netherlands. He had his best year in 1989 when he won four races and finished the season in second place behind Àlex Crivillé in the 125cc world championship, and in 1990 when he won five races and finished again in second place in the 125 class, this time to Loris Capirossi.

== Career statistics ==
=== Grand Prix motorcycle racing ===
==== Races by year ====
(key) (Races in bold indicate pole position) (Races in italics indicate fastest lap)

| Year | Class | Bike | 1 | 2 | 3 | 4 | 5 | 6 | 7 | 8 | 9 | 10 | 11 | 12 | 13 | 14 | Pos. | Pts |
|---|---|---|---|---|---|---|---|---|---|---|---|---|---|---|---|---|---|---|
| 1980 | 50cc | Kreidler | NAT | ESP | YUG; 16 | NED; 4 | BEL; 4 | GER; 4 | | | | | | | | | 6th | 24 |
| 1981 | 50cc | Kreidler | | | GER | NAT | | ESP | YUG; Ret | NED | BEL | RSM | | | | CZE; Ret | NC | 0 |
| 1981 | 125cc | MBA | ARG | AUT | GER | NAT | FRA | ESP | YUG; DNS | NED | | RSM | GBR | FIN | SWE | | NC | 0 |
| 1982 | 50cc | Kreidler | | | | ESP; 8 | NAT; Ret | NED; 9 | | YUG; 7 | | | | | RSM; 8 | GER; Ret | 9th | 12 |
| 1982 | 125cc | MBA | ARG | AUT | FRA | ESP | NAT | NED; 22 | BEL | YUG | GBR | SWE | FIN | CZE | | | NC | 0 |
| 1983 | 50cc | Kreidler | FRA; Ret | NAT; 5 | GER; 6 | ESP; 7 | | YUG; 2 | NED; 9 | | | | RSM; 6 | | | | 4th | 34 |
| 1983 | 125cc | MBA | FRA; Ret | NAT | GER; Ret | ESP; Ret | AUT | YUG; Ret | NED; Ret | BEL | GBR | SWE | RSM | | | | NC | 0 |
| 1984 | 80cc | Huvo-Casal | NAT; 4 | ESP; 5 | AUT; 6 | GER; Ret | | NED; 2 | BEL; 3 | RSM; Ret | | | | | | | 6th | 47 |
| 1984 | 80cc | Kreidler | | | | | YUG; 5 | | | | | | | | | | 6th | 47 |
| 1985 | 80cc | Huvo-Casal | ESP; Ret | GER; 6 | NAT; DNS | YUG | NED | FRA | RSM; 4 | | | | | | | | 12th | 13 |
| 1986 | 80cc | Huvo-Casal | ESP; 18 | NAT; 7 | GER; 6 | AUT; 4 | YUG; 5 | NED; 3 | GBR; 5 | RSM; 4 | BWU; 3 | | | | | | 4th | 57 |
| 1987 | 80cc | Casal | ESP; DNS | GER | NAT | AUT; 6 | YUG; 8 | NED; Ret | | GBR; Ret | | CZE; 12 | RSM; 8 | POR; 11 | | | 13th | 11 |
| 1987 | 125cc | MBA | ESP; DNS | GER | NAT | AUT | | NED; DNQ | FRA; DNQ | GBR | SWE | CZE | RSM | POR | | | NC | 0 |
| 1988 | 125cc | Honda | ESP; 10 | NAT; 5 | **GER**; 3 | AUT; 6 | **NED**; 3 | BEL; 4 | YUG; 14 | FRA; 12 | GBR; 10 | SWE; 4 | **CZE**; 3 | | | | 3rd | 110 |
| 1989 | 125cc | Honda | JPN; Ret | AUS; 8 | ESP; Ret | **NAT**; 2 | GER; 4 | AUT; 1 | **NED**; 1 | BEL; 1 | FRA; Ret | **GBR**; 1 | SWE; 2 | CZE; 2 | | | 2nd | 152 |
| 1990 | 125cc | Honda | JPN; 1 | ESP; DNS | NAT; 4 | GER; 4 | **AUT**; 12 | YUG; 12 | **NED**; Ret | BEL; 1 | FRA; 1 | GBR; 3 | SWE; 1 | CZE; 1 | HUN; 5 | **AUS**; 4 | 2nd | 173 |
| 1991 | 125cc | Honda | JPN; 16 | AUS; 9 | ESP; 8 | ITA; 5 | GER; 12 | AUT; 5 | EUR; 16 | NED; 7 | FRA; 19 | GBR; DNS | RSM; 20 | CZE; 16 | MAL; 12 | | 14th | 54 |
| 1992 | 125cc | Aprilia | JPN; Ret | AUS; 12 | MAL; 9 | ESP; 13 | ITA; Ret | EUR; 11 | GER; 12 | NED; 20 | HUN; 6 | FRA; 9 | GBR; Ret | BRA; Ret | RSA; 9 | | 13th | 12 |
| 1993 | 125cc | Rumi | AUS; 19 | MAL; DNS | JPN; 21 | ESP; 17 | | | | | | | | | | | 25th | 16 |
| 1993 | 125cc | Honda | | | | | AUT; 23 | GER; 21 | NED; 5 | EUR; 11 | RSM; 19 | GBR; 21 | CZE; 18 | ITA; 23 | USA; 19 | FIM; 19 | 25th | 16 |
| 1994 | 125cc | Honda | AUS; 24 | MAL; 23 | JPN; Ret | ESP; 17 | AUT; 23 | GER; Ret | NED; 20 | ITA; 22 | FRA; 23 | GBR; Ret | CZE; Ret | USA; Ret | ARG; Ret | EUR; 23 | NC | 0 |
