= Ralf Waldmann =

German motorcycle racer (1966–2018)

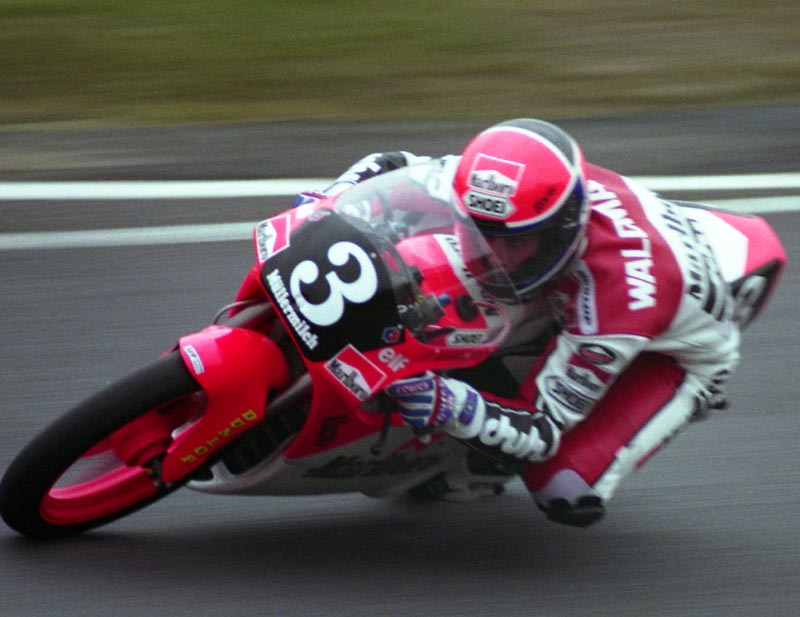
- Nationality: German
- Born: 14 July 1966; Hagen, West Germany
- Died: 10 March 2018 (aged 51); Ennepetal, Germany
Motorcycle racing career statistics
Grand Prix motorcycle racing
Active years	1986 - 2000, 2002, 2009
First race	1986 80cc Baden-Württemberg Grand Prix
Last race	2009 250cc British Grand Prix
First win	1991 125cc West German Grand Prix
Last win	2000 250cc British Grand Prix
Team(s)	Honda, Modenas, Aprilia
Starts / Wins / Podiums / Poles / F. laps / Points; 169 / 20 / 50 / 10 / 16 / 1668

Ralf Waldmann (14 July 1966 – 10 March 2018) was a German Grand Prix motorcycle road racer. He was awarded the German Motorcycle Racer of the Year Award in 1992, 1995 and 1997.

== Motorcycle racing career ==
In 1996, Waldmann finished second to Max Biaggi in the 250cc world championship. In the 1997 season, he gave Biaggi a strong challenge, winning four races and finishing only two points behind the Italian. Kenny Roberts offered him a job for the 1998 season on a 500cc Modenas but the competition was too strong and he finished in 14th place. He returned to the 250 class the following year riding for the Aprilia team and retired from motorcycle competition after the 2002 season. Waldmann came out of semi-retirement in 2003 and signed with the new Harris WCM MotoGP team, but quit before the year began after failing to adapt to the new four-stroke Grand Prix bikes.

Waldmann's final win at the British Grand Prix in 2000 is of particular note. Running on wet tyres on a drying track he trailed the leaders by over a minute and half with ten laps remaining. But as rain started to fall again, he came back from almost a lap down to win the race at the final corner, just 0.3 seconds from Frenchman Olivier Jacque.

In 2009, Waldmann joined Martin Wimmer in buying out the motorbike manufacturing company MZ, from the Hong Leong Group. He also had a brief return to Grand Prix motorcycle racing, substituting for the injured rider Vladimir Leonov at the British Grand Prix.

== Death ==
Waldmann died on 10 March 2018 in Ennepetal, Germany of a suspected heart attack at the age of 51.

== Career statistics ==
=== Grand Prix motorcycle racing ===
==== By class ====
Class	Season	1st GP	1st Pod	1st Win	Race	Win	Podiums	Pole	FLap	Pts	WChmp
80cc	1986–1989	1986 Baden-Württemberg			12	0	0	0	0	24	0
125cc	1988–1993	1989 Great Britain	1991 Germany	1991 Germany	55	6	15	2	6	432	0
250cc	1994–1997, 1999–2000, 2002, 2009	1994 Australia	1994 Italy	1994 Italy	90	14	35	8	10	1166	0
500cc	1998	1998 Japan			12	0	0	0	0	46	0
Total	1986–2000, 2002, 2009				**169**	**20**	**50**	**10**	**16**	**1668**	**0**

==== Races by year ====
(key) (Races in bold indicate pole position) (Races in italics indicate fastest lap)

Year	Class	Bike	1	2	3	4	5	6	7	8	9	10	11	12	13	14	15	16	Pos.	Pts
1986	80cc	Krauser	SPA	NAT	GER	AUT	YUG	NED	GBR	RSM	BWU; 19								NC	0
1987	80cc	ERK	SPA	GER; 10	NAT	AUT; 12	YUG	NED; 19	GBR	CZE; Ret	RSM	POR							25th	1
1988	80cc	Seel	SPA	EXP	NAT	GER; 17	NED	YUG	CZE										NC	0
1988	125cc	Rotax	SPA	NAT	GER; DNQ	AUT	NED	BEL	YUG	FRA	GBR	SWE	CZE						NC	0
1989	80cc	Seel	SPA; 8	NAT; 14	GER; 7	YUG; Ret	NED; 12	CZE; 19											14th	23
1989	125cc	Seel	JPN	AUS	SPA; DNQ	NAT	GER; DNQ	AUT	NED	BEL; DNQ	FRA	GBR; Ret	SWE; 19	CZE; Ret					NC	0
1990	125cc	JJ Cobas	JPN	SPA; Ret	NAT; 25	GER; 11	AUT; 16	YUG; 4	NED; Ret	BEL; Ret	FRA; Ret	GBR; 15	SWE; 23	CZE; Ret	HUN; Ret	AUS; Ret			23rd	19
1991	125cc	Honda	JPN; 7	AUS; 5	SPA; 7	ITA; 9	GER; 1	**AUT**; 2	EUR; 6	NED; 1	FRA; 2	GBR; Ret	RSM; 4	CZE; 8	MAL				3rd	141
1992	125cc	Honda	JPN; 1	AUS; 1	MAL; 3	SPA; 1	ITA; Ret	EUR; 12	**GER**; 3	NED; 9	HUN; 2	FRA; 10	GBR; 7	BRA; 15	RSA; 6				3rd	112
1993	125cc	Aprilia	AUS; Ret	MAL; 5	JPN; 6	SPA; 2	AUT; 9	GER; 5	NED; Ret	EUR; 2	RSM; 4	GBR; 3	CZE; Ret	ITA; 5	USA; 3	FIM; 1			4th	160
1994	250cc	Honda	AUS; 7	MAL; 6	JPN; Ret	SPA; 4	AUT; 5	GER; 6	NED; 4	ITA; 1	FRA; 4	GBR; 7	CZE; 2	USA; 10	ARG; 8	EUR; 7			5th	156
1995	250cc	Honda	AUS; 1	MAL; 4	JPN; 1	SPA; 5	GER; Ret	ITA; 4	NED; 2	FRA; 1	GBR; 3	CZE; 3	BRA; 4	ARG; 6	EUR; 3				3rd	203
1996	250cc	Honda	MAL; DNS	INA; 3	JPN; 8	SPA; 3	ITA; 3	FRA; 2	NED; 1	**GER**; 1	GBR; 2	AUT; 1	CZE; 3	IMO; 1	CAT; 3	BRA; 2	AUS; 2		2nd	268
1997	250cc	Honda	MAL; 4	JPN; 5	**SPA**; 1	ITA; 4	**AUT**; 2	FRA; 3	NED; 2	IMO; 4	GER; 3	BRA; 12	GBR; 1	**CZE**; 4	**CAT**; 1	INA; 7	AUS; 1		2nd	248
1998	500cc	Modenas	JPN; Ret	MAL; 9	SPA; 10	ITA; 11	FRA; 12	MAD; 10	NED; DNS	GBR	GER; 7	CZE; 13	IMO; 15	CAT; 12	AUS; Ret	ARG; 15			14th	46
1999	250cc	Aprilia	MAL; DNS	JPN	SPA; 6	FRA; 4	ITA; 2	CAT; Ret	NED; 6	GBR; 8	GER; 3	**CZE**; 2	IMO; 7	VAL; Ret	AUS; 5	RSA; Ret	BRA; 7	ARG; 11	6th	131
2000	250cc	Aprilia	RSA; 7	MAL; 4	JPN; Ret	**SPA**; 1	FRA; 8	ITA; Ret	CAT; 7	**NED**; 24	GBR; 1	GER; 8	CZE; 5	POR; Ret	VAL; 13	BRA; 6	PAC; 7	AUS; 4	7th	143
2002	250cc	Aprilia	JPN	RSA	SPA	FRA	ITA	CAT	NED; 11	GBR	GER; 9	CZE; 11	POR	BRA	PAC	MAL	AUS	VAL	19th	17
2009	250cc	Aprilia	QAT	JPN	SPA	FRA	ITA	CAT	NED	GER	GBR; Ret	CZE	INP	SMR	POR	AUS	MAL	VAL	NC	0

=== Superbike World Championship ===
==== Races by year ====
(key) (Races in bold indicate pole position) (Races in italics indicate fastest lap)

Year	Make	1		2		3		4		5		6		7		8		9		10		11		12		Pos.	Pts
Year	Make	R1	R2	R1	R2	R1	R2	R1	R2	R1	R2	R1	R2	R1	R2	R1	R2	R1	R2	R1	R2	R1	R2	R1	R2	Pos.	Pts
2005	Honda	QAT	QAT	AUS	AUS	SPA	SPA	ITA	ITA	EUR	EUR	SMR	SMR	CZE	CZE	GBR	GBR	NED	NED	GER; Ret	GER; DNS	ITA	ITA	FRA	FRA	NC	0
