= 1994 British motorcycle Grand Prix =

(United Kingdom) 1994 British Grand Prix
Race details
- Race 10 of 14 races in the 1994 Grand Prix motorcycle racing season
- Date: 24 July 1994
- Official name: British Motorcycle Grand Prix
- Location: Donington Park
- Course: Permanent racing facility; 4.023 km (2.500 mi)

MotoGP
Pole position
- Rider: (Australia) Mick Doohan
- Time: 1:33.611
Fastest lap
- Rider: (United States) Kevin Schwantz
- Time: 1:34.161
Podium
- First: (United States) Kevin Schwantz
- Second: (Australia) Mick Doohan
- Third: (Italy) Luca Cadalora

250cc
Pole position
- Rider: (Italy) Loris Capirossi
- Time: 1:34.990
Fastest lap
- Rider: (Italy) Loris Capirossi
- Time: 1:34.953 on lap 19
Podium
- First: (Italy) Loris Capirossi
- Second: (Japan) Tadayuki Okada
- Third: (Italy) Doriano Romboni

125cc
Pole position
- Rider: (Japan) Kazuto Sakata
- Time: 1:41.027
Fastest lap
- Rider: (Germany) Peter Öttl
- Time: 1:41.643
Podium
- First: (Japan) Takeshi Tsujimura
- Second: (Italy) Stefano Perugini
- Third: (Germany) Peter Öttl

The 1994 British motorcycle Grand Prix was the tenth round of the 1994 Grand Prix motorcycle racing season. It took place on 24 July 1994 at the Donington Park circuit.

This was the 25th and last grand prix win for defending 500cc world champion Kevin Schwantz.

== 500 cc classification ==
Pos.	Rider	Team	Manufacturer	Laps	Time/Retired	Points
1	(United States) Kevin Schwantz	Lucky Strike Suzuki	Suzuki	30	47:31.632	25
2	(Australia) Mick Doohan	Honda Team HRC	Honda	30	+2.366	20
3	(Italy) Luca Cadalora	Marlboro Team Roberts	Yamaha	30	+5.810	16
4	(United States) John Kocinski	Cagiva Team Agostini	Cagiva	30	+12.260	13
5	(United States) Doug Chandler	Cagiva Team Agostini	Cagiva	30	+16.464	11
6	(Spain) Àlex Crivillé	Honda Team HRC	Honda	30	+19.774	10
7	(Spain) Alberto Puig	Ducados Honda Pons	Honda	30	+39.656	9
8	(United Kingdom) Niall Mackenzie	Slick 50 Team WCM	ROC Yamaha	30	+53.064	8
9	(Japan) Shinichi Itoh	Honda Team HRC	Honda	30	+1:00.783	7
10	(United Kingdom) Jeremy McWilliams	Millar Racing	Yamaha	30	+1:12.378	6
11	(France) Bernard Garcia	Yamaha Motor France	ROC Yamaha	30	+1:15.409	5
12	(United Kingdom) Sean Emmett	Shell Harris Grand Prix	Harris Yamaha	30	+1:25.088	4
13	(Belgium) Laurent Naveau	Euro Team	ROC Yamaha	30	+1:25.356	3
14	(United Kingdom) John Reynolds	Padgett's Motorcycles	Harris Yamaha	29	+1 Lap	2
15	(France) Bruno Bonhuil	MTD Objectif 500	ROC Yamaha	29	+1 Lap	1
16	(United Kingdom) Kevin Mitchell	MBM Racing	Harris Yamaha	29	+1 Lap	
17	(Germany) Udo Mark	Sachsen Racing Team	ROC Yamaha	29	+1 Lap	
18	(Italy) Lucio Pedercini	Team Pedercini	ROC Yamaha	29	+1 Lap	
19	(France) Jean Foray	Jean Foray Racing Team	ROC Yamaha	29	+1 Lap	
20	(Luxembourg) Andreas Leuthe	Team Doppler Austria	ROC Yamaha	29	+1 Lap	
21	(Netherlands) Cees Doorakkers	Team Doorakkers	Harris Yamaha	29	+1 Lap	
Ret	(Switzerland) Bernard Haenggeli	Haenggeli Racing	ROC Yamaha	24	Retirement	
Ret	(France) Marc Garcia	DR Team Shark	ROC Yamaha	20	Retirement	
Ret	(Italy) Cristiano Migliorati	Team Pedercini	ROC Yamaha	9	Retirement	
Ret	(Brazil) Alex Barros	Lucky Strike Suzuki	Suzuki	5	Accident	
Ret	(United Kingdom) James Haydon	Team Elit	ROC Yamaha	1	Retirement	
Ret	(United Kingdom) Nick Hopkins	Triton Team GB	Harris Yamaha	1	Retirement	
DNS	(France) Jean Pierre Jeandat	JPJ Racing	ROC Yamaha		Did not start	
DNS	(United Kingdom) Carl Fogarty	Cagiva Team Agostini	Cagiva		Did not start	
DNS	(Japan) Norifumi Abe	Marlboro Team Roberts	Yamaha		Did not start	
Sources:

- Carl Fogarty crashed in practice and withdrew from the event.
- Norifumi Abe suffered a broken hand in a crash during practice and withdrew from the event.

== 250 cc classification ==
Pos	Rider	Manufacturer	Laps	Time/Retired	Points
1	(Italy) Loris Capirossi	Honda	27	43:18.624	25
2	(Japan) Tadayuki Okada	Honda	27	+3.233	20
3	(Italy) Doriano Romboni	Honda	27	+3.356	16
4	(Japan) Tetsuya Harada	Yamaha	27	+3.876	13
5	(France) Jean-Michel Bayle	Aprilia	27	+5.516	11
6	(France) Jean Philippe Ruggia	Aprilia	27	+6.107	10
7	(Germany) Ralf Waldmann	Honda	27	+6.486	9
8	(Japan) Nobuatsu Aoki	Honda	27	+27.333	8
9	(Spain) Luis D'Antin	Honda	27	+35.490	7
10	(Switzerland) Eskil Suter	Aprilia	27	+36.310	6
11	(Netherlands) Wilco Zeelenberg	Honda	27	+36.895	5
12	(Spain) Carlos Checa	Honda	27	+37.120	4
13	(Japan) Toshihiko Honma	Yamaha	27	+37.900	3
14	(Switzerland) Adrien Bosshard	Honda	27	+1:03.992	2
15	(Spain) Luis Maurel	Honda	27	+1:09.666	1
16	(Netherlands) Jurgen vd Goorbergh	Aprilia	27	+1:09.788	
17	(Netherlands) Patrick vd Goorbergh	Aprilia	27	+1:31.711	
18	(Germany) Adolf Stadler	Honda	27	+1:31.906	
19	(Spain) José Luis Cardoso	Aprilia	26	+1 Lap	
20	(United Kingdom) Eugene McManus	Yamaha	26	+1 Lap	
21	(France) Christian Boudinot	Aprilia	26	+1 Lap	
22	(Canada) Rodney Fee	Honda	26	+1 Lap	
23	(Spain) Enrique de Juan	Aprilia	26	+1 Lap	
24	(United States) Donnie Hough	Honda	25	+2 Laps	
Ret	(Italy) Max Biaggi	Aprilia	19	Accident	
Ret	(France) Noel Ferro	Honda	18	Retirement	
Ret	(Italy) Giuseppe Fiorillo	Honda	13	Retirement	
Ret	(Finland) Krisse Kaas	Yamaha	13	Retirement	
Ret	(France) Frederic Protat	Honda	9	Retirement	
Ret	(Italy) Alessandro Gramigni	Aprilia	7	Retirement	
Ret	(Austria) Andreas Preining	Aprilia	1	Collision Damage	
Ret	(Spain) Juan Borja	Honda	0	Collision	
DNS	(Germany) Bernd Kassner	Aprilia		Did not start	
DNS	(Spain) Manuel Hernández	Aprilia		Did not start	

== 125 cc classification ==
Pos	Rider	Manufacturer	Laps	Time/Retired	Points
1	(Japan) Takeshi Tsujimura	Honda	26	44:22.659	25
2	(Italy) Stefano Perugini	Aprilia	26	+0.267	20
3	(Germany) Peter Öttl	Aprilia	26	+1.459	16
4	(Japan) Kazuto Sakata	Aprilia	26	+1.631	13
5	(Spain) Herri Torrontegui	Aprilia	26	+1.853	11
6	(Japan) Noboru Ueda	Honda	26	+16.690	10
7	(Switzerland) Olivier Petrucciani	Aprilia	26	+22.169	9
8	(Germany) Dirk Raudies	Honda	26	+23.821	8
9	(Spain) Carlos Giro	Aprilia	26	+24.310	7
10	(Spain) Jorge Martinez	Yamaha	26	+24.597	6
11	(Japan) Hideyuki Nakajo	Honda	26	+31.753	5
12	(Japan) Masaki Tokudome	Honda	26	+33.646	4
13	(Japan) Haruchika Aoki	Honda	26	+36.317	3
14	(Italy) Gabriele Debbia	Aprilia	26	+36.437	2
15	(Japan) Akira Saito	Honda	26	+36.903	1
16	(Germany) Manfred Geissler	Aprilia	26	+44.149	
17	(Germany) Stefan Prein	Yamaha	26	+45.273	
18	(Spain) Enrique Maturana	Yamaha	26	+49.936	
19	(Japan) Tomoko Igata	Honda	26	+50.811	
20	(Italy) Fausto Gresini	Honda	26	+51.071	
21	(United Kingdom) Neil Hodgson	Honda	26	+1:06.813	
22	(Spain) Emilio Alzamora	Honda	26	+1:08.288	
23	(Italy) Lucio Cecchinello	Honda	26	+1:08.761	
24	(France) Frederic Petit	Yamaha	26	+1:09.329	
25	(Japan) Yasuaki Takahashi	Honda	26	+1:43.447	
26	(France) Bertrand Stey	Honda	26	+1:44.015	
27	(Italy) Vittorio Lopez	Honda	26	+2:21.960	
28	(United Kingdom) Darren Barton	Honda	25	+1 Lap	
Ret	(Austria) Manfred Baumann	Yamaha	16	Retirement	
Ret	(Netherlands) Loek Bodelier	Honda	14	Accident	
Ret	(Italy) Luigi Ancona	Honda	12	Retirement	
Ret	(Australia) Garry McCoy	Aprilia	11	Retirement	
Ret	(Italy) Gianluigi Scalvini	Aprilia	10	Retirement	
Ret	(United Kingdom) Kevin Mawdsley	Honda	10	Retirement	
Ret	(Netherlands) Hans Spaan	Honda	4	Handling	
DNS	(Germany) Frank Baldinger	Honda		Did not start	

Previous race: 1994 French Grand Prix	FIM Grand Prix World Championship; 1994 season	Next race: 1994 Czech Republic Grand Prix
Previous race: 1993 British Grand Prix	British Grand Prix	Next race: 1995 British Grand Prix
