= 1994 French motorcycle Grand Prix =

(France) 1994 French Grand Prix
Race details
- Race 9 of 14 races in the 1994 Grand Prix motorcycle racing season
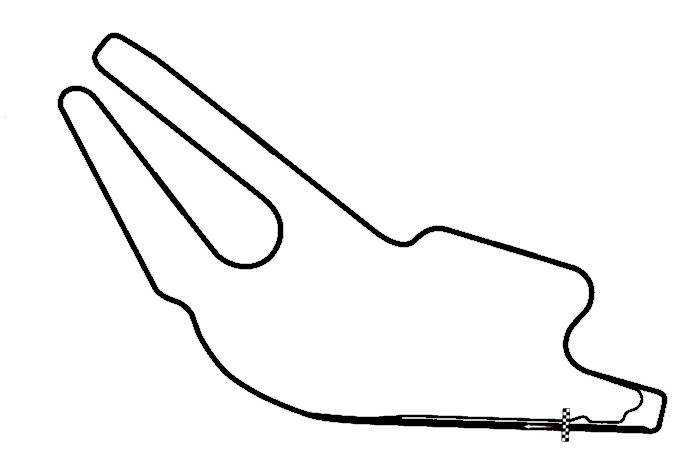
- Date: 17 July 1994
- Official name: Grand Prix de France Moto
- Location: Bugatti Circuit
- Course: Permanent racing facility; 3.812 km (2.369 mi)

MotoGP
Pole position
- Rider: (Australia) Mick Doohan
- Time: 1:40.759
Fastest lap
- Rider: (Australia) Mick Doohan
- Time: 1:41.686 on lap 12
Podium
- First: (Australia) Mick Doohan
- Second: (United States) John Kocinski
- Third: (Spain) Àlex Crivillé

250cc
Pole position
- Rider: (Italy) Doriano Romboni
- Time: 1:42.967
Fastest lap
- Rider: (Italy) Loris Capirossi
- Time: 1:44.030
Podium
- First: (Italy) Loris Capirossi
- Second: (Italy) Doriano Romboni
- Third: (Italy) Max Biaggi

125cc
Pole position
- Rider: (Japan) Kazuto Sakata
- Time: 1:50.552
Fastest lap
- Rider: (Japan) Hideyuki Nakajo
- Time: 1:50.818
Podium
- First: (Japan) Noboru Ueda
- Second: (Japan) Takeshi Tsujimura
- Third: (Japan) Kazuto Sakata

The 1994 French motorcycle Grand Prix was the ninth round of the 1994 Grand Prix motorcycle racing season. It took place on 17 July 1994 at the Bugatti Circuit located in Le Mans, France.

== 500 cc classification ==
Pos.	Rider	Team	Manufacturer	Laps	Time/Retired	Points
1	(Australia) Mick Doohan	Honda Team HRC	Honda	27	46:28.917	25
2	(United States) John Kocinski	Cagiva Team Agostini	Cagiva	27	+6.101	20
3	(Spain) Àlex Crivillé	Honda Team HRC	Honda	27	+11.313	16
4	(Spain) Alberto Puig	Ducados Honda Pons	Honda	27	+12.327	13
5	(Japan) Shinichi Itoh	Honda Team HRC	Honda	27	+20.087	11
6	(Brazil) Alex Barros	Lucky Strike Suzuki	Suzuki	27	+26.069	10
7	(Italy) Luca Cadalora	Marlboro Team Roberts	Yamaha	27	+36.873	9
8	(United Kingdom) Jeremy McWilliams	Millar Racing	Yamaha	27	+1:12.759	8
9	(France) Marc Garcia	DR Team Shark	ROC Yamaha	27	+1:43.508	7
10	(Spain) Juan López Mella	Lopez Mella Racing Team	ROC Yamaha	26	+1 Lap	6
11	(France) Jean Foray	Jean Foray Racing Team	ROC Yamaha	26	+1 Lap	5
12	(Switzerland) Bernard Haenggeli	Haenggeli Racing	ROC Yamaha	26	+1 Lap	4
13	(France) Bruno Bonhuil	MTD Objectif 500	ROC Yamaha	26	+1 Lap	3
14	(Germany) Udo Mark	Sachsen Racing Team	ROC Yamaha	26	+1 Lap	2
15	(Italy) Cristiano Migliorati	Team Pedercini	ROC Yamaha	26	+1 Lap	1
16	(United Kingdom) Kevin Mitchell	MBM Racing	Harris Yamaha	26	+1 Lap	
17	(Luxembourg) Andreas Leuthe	Team Doppler Austria	ROC Yamaha	26	+1 Lap	
18	(France) Philippe Monneret	Team ROC	ROC Yamaha	26	+1 Lap	
Ret	(United States) Kevin Schwantz	Lucky Strike Suzuki	Suzuki	26	Accident	
Ret	(United Kingdom) John Reynolds	Padgett's Motorcycles	Harris Yamaha	25	Retirement	
Ret	(United Kingdom) Sean Emmett	Shell Harris Grand Prix	Harris Yamaha	24	Retirement	
Ret	(United Kingdom) Niall Mackenzie	Slick 50 Team WCM	ROC Yamaha	18	Retirement	
Ret	(United States) Doug Chandler	Cagiva Team Agostini	Cagiva	8	Water Leak	
Ret	(Italy) Ermanno Bastianini	Team Elit	ROC Yamaha	8	Accident	
Ret	(Italy) Lucio Pedercini	Team Pedercini	ROC Yamaha	6	Retirement	
Ret	(Netherlands) Cees Doorakkers	Team Doorakkers	Harris Yamaha	6	Retirement	
Ret	(Belgium) Laurent Naveau	Euro Team	ROC Yamaha	2	Accident	
Ret	(France) Bernard Garcia	Yamaha Motor France	ROC Yamaha	1	Accident	
Ret	(France) Jean Pierre Jeandat	JPJ Racing	ROC Yamaha	1	Retirement	
DNS	(Australia) Daryl Beattie	Marlboro Team Roberts	Yamaha		Did not start	
DNS	(Germany) Evren Bischoff	Sachsen Racing Team	Harris Yamaha		Did not start	
DNQ	(Italy) Paul Pellissier	Team Paton	Team Paton		Did not qualify	
Sources:

- Daryl Beattie crashed in the first practice and his foot got stuck between the chain and rear sprocket which resulted in his toes being amputated.

== 250 cc classification ==
Pos	Rider	Manufacturer	Laps	Time/Retired	Points
1	(Italy) Loris Capirossi	Honda	25	43:06.089	25
2	(Italy) Doriano Romboni	Honda	25	+0.689	20
3	(Italy) Max Biaggi	Aprilia	25	+1.181	16
4	(Germany) Ralf Waldmann	Honda	25	+5.123	13
5	(France) Jean-Michel Bayle	Aprilia	25	+5.528	11
6	(Japan) Nobuatsu Aoki	Honda	25	+5.821	10
7	(France) Jean Philippe Ruggia	Aprilia	25	+9.018	9
8	(Japan) Tetsuya Harada	Yamaha	25	+24.059	8
9	(Japan) Tadayuki Okada	Honda	25	+29.043	7
10	(Netherlands) Wilco Zeelenberg	Honda	25	+36.273	6
11	(Japan) Toshihiko Honma	Yamaha	25	+41.787	5
12	(Switzerland) Adrien Bosshard	Honda	25	+52.489	4
13	(Spain) Carlos Checa	Honda	25	+57.206	3
14	(Switzerland) Eskil Suter	Aprilia	25	+1:01.503	2
15	(Spain) Luis Maurel	Honda	25	+1:03.353	1
16	(Netherlands) Patrick vd Goorbergh	Aprilia	25	+1:04.277	
17	(Germany) Adolf Stadler	Honda	25	+1:16.427	
18	(Spain) Juan Borja	Honda	25	+1:19.607	
19	(France) Christian Boudinot	Aprilia	25	+1:20.163	
20	(Germany) Bernd Kassner	Aprilia	25	+1:20.761	
21	(Austria) Andreas Preining	Aprilia	25	+1:26.864	
22	(France) Noel Ferro	Honda	25	+1:27.009	
23	(France) Sebastien Scarnato	Honda	25	+1:36.321	
24	(Finland) Krisse Kaas	Yamaha	24	+1 Lap	
25	(United States) Donnie Hough	Honda	24	+1 Lap	
Ret	(Netherlands) Jurgen vd Goorbergh	Aprilia	21	Retirement	
Ret	(Italy) Alessandro Gramigni	Aprilia	17	Retirement	
Ret	(France) Frederic Protat	Honda	16	Retirement	
Ret	(Italy) Giuseppe Fiorillo	Honda	14	Retirement	
Ret	(Canada) Rodney Fee	Honda	13	Retirement	
Ret	(Spain) Enrique de Juan	Aprilia	10	Retirement	
Ret	(Spain) José Luis Cardoso	Aprilia	7	Retirement	
Ret	(Spain) Luis D'Antin	Honda	6	Retirement	
Ret	(Spain) Manuel Hernandez	Aprilia	3	Retirement	

== 125 cc classification ==
Pos	Rider	Manufacturer	Laps	Time/Retired	Points
1	(Japan) Noboru Ueda	Honda	23	42:59.000	25
2	(Japan) Takeshi Tsujimura	Honda	23	+0.112	20
3	(Japan) Kazuto Sakata	Aprilia	23	+3.118	16
4	(Germany) Peter Öttl	Aprilia	23	+4.034	13
5	(Germany) Dirk Raudies	Honda	23	+9.738	11
6	(Spain) Jorge Martinez	Yamaha	23	+9.830	10
7	(Italy) Stefano Perugini	Aprilia	23	+12.029	9
8	(Spain) Herri Torrontegui	Aprilia	23	+14.428	8
9	(Japan) Masaki Tokudome	Honda	23	+14.721	7
10	(Italy) Fausto Gresini	Honda	23	+21.779	6
11	(Japan) Hideyuki Nakajo	Honda	23	+27.086	5
12	(Japan) Haruchika Aoki	Honda	23	+29.174	4
13	(Spain) Enrique Maturana	Yamaha	23	+42.752	3
14	(Japan) Akira Saito	Honda	23	+42.919	2
15	(Germany) Stefan Prein	Yamaha	23	+43.360	1
16	(Germany) Manfred Geissler	Aprilia	23	+43.500	
17	(Australia) Garry McCoy	Aprilia	23	+44.162	
18	(Switzerland) Olivier Petrucciani	Aprilia	23	+47.123	
19	(Italy) Gabriele Debbia	Aprilia	23	+59.934	
20	(United Kingdom) Neil Hodgson	Honda	23	+1:12.794	
21	(France) Gregory Fouet	Yamaha	23	+1:39.540	
22	(France) Bertrand Stey	Honda	23	+1:43.111	
23	(Netherlands) Hans Spaan	Honda	23	+1:50.448	
24	(Germany) Frank Baldinger	Honda	22	+1 Lap	
25	(Italy) Luigi Ancona	Honda	22	+1 Lap	
26	(Japan) Yasuaki Takahashi	Honda	22	+1 Lap	
27	(France) Fabien Rousseau	Aprilia	22	+1 Lap	
NC	(Japan) Tomoko Igata	Honda	17	+ 6 Laps	
Ret	(Italy) Vittorio Lopez	Honda	21	Retirement	
Ret	(Austria) Manfred Baumann	Yamaha	21	Retirement	
Ret	(Italy) Gianluigi Scalvini	Aprilia	20	Retirement	
Ret	(Italy) Lucio Cecchinello	Honda	16	Retirement	
Ret	(Spain) Emilio Alzamora	Honda	10	Retirement	
Ret	(Netherlands) Loek Bodelier	Honda	6	Retirement	
Ret	(France) Frederic Petit	Yamaha	3	Retirement	
Ret	(Spain) Carlos Giro	Aprilia	0	Retirement	

Previous race: 1994 Italian Grand Prix	FIM Grand Prix World Championship; 1994 season	Next race: 1994 British Grand Prix
Previous race: 1992 French Grand Prix	French Grand Prix	Next race: 1995 French Grand Prix
