= Neil Hodgson =

British motorcycle racer

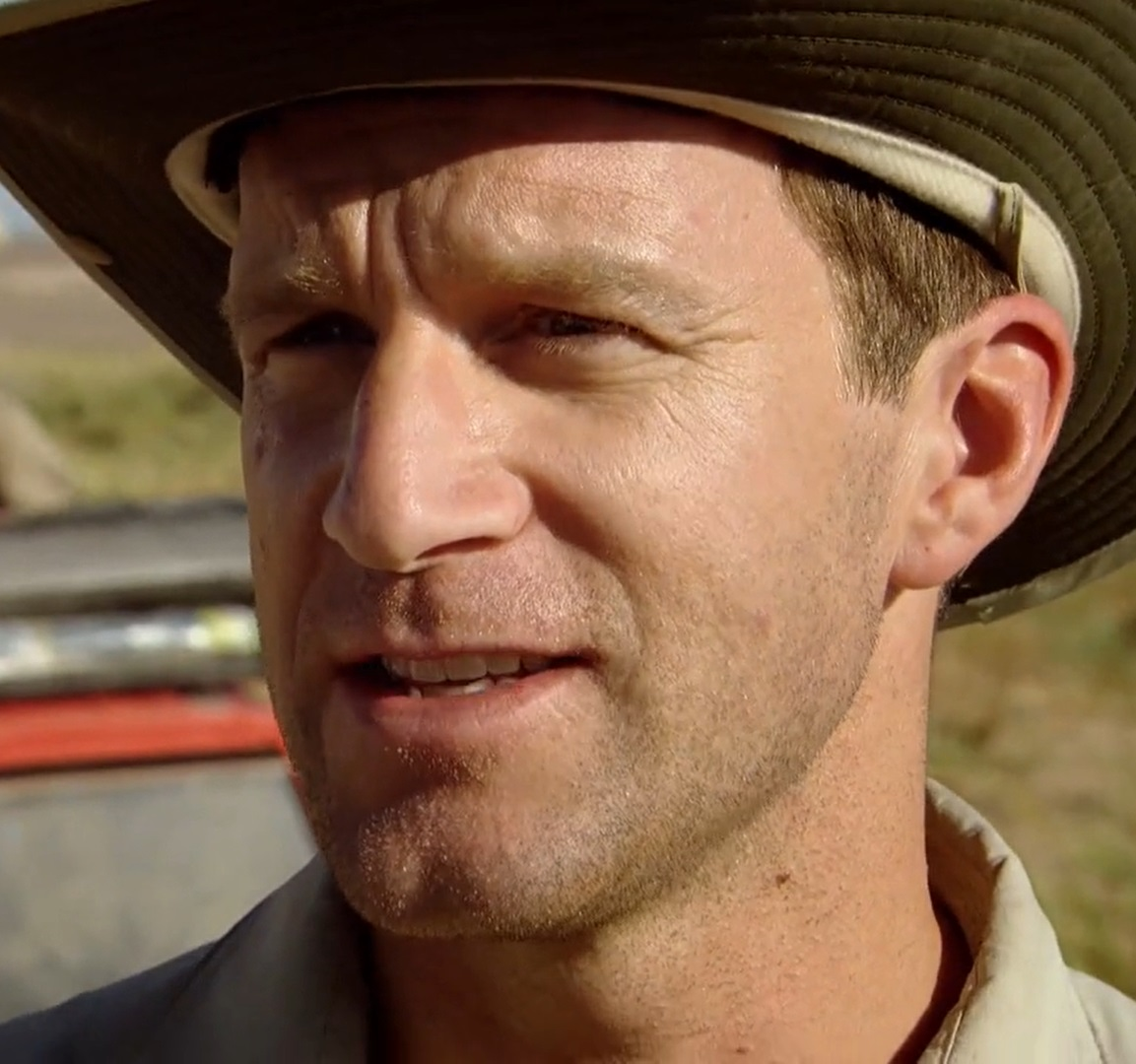
- Hodgson in Driven to Extremes 2013
- Nationality: English
- Born: 20 November 1973 (age 53); Burnley, Lancashire, England
- Bike number: 100
- Website: Neil Hodgson 100
Motorcycle racing career statistics
Superbike World Championship
Active years	1996–1999, 2001–2003
Manufacturers	Ducati, Kawasaki
Championships	1 (2003)
2003 championship position	1st (489 pts)
Starts / Wins / Podiums / Poles / F. laps / Points; 147 / 16 / 41 / 16 / 14 / 1566,5

Neil Stuart Hodgson (born 20 November 1973) is a British former motorcycle racer, who won the 2000 British Superbike Championship, and the 2003 Superbike World Championship titles. He then went on to have a moderately successful four years in the American Superbike Championship, with a best 5th place championship finish.

At the start of the 2010 season, Hodgson returned to the British Superbike Championship with the Motorpoint Yamaha team managed by Rob McElnea. However on 22 April 2010, Hodgson announced his retirement from British superbikes and competitive motorcycle racing, due to a shoulder injury sustained in a motocross accident during the previous AMA season. Hodgson aggravated the injury in the first round of the British Superbike Championship at the Brands Hatch Indy circuit.

Hodgson is now married to Victoria Hodgson and divides his time between family in the Isle of Man whilst working as a motorcycle racing commentator and TV studio pundit, road racing trackday instructor and as an ambassador for motorcycle companies including Ducati.

== Personal life ==
Hodgson was born in Burnley and lived there and in Nelson and Colne, Lancashire during his early life, attending Ss John Fisher and Thomas More RC High School. He was six when he started riding his brother's bike around playing fields in Brierfield near his grandma's home. Hodgson has a daughter Hollie-Jean and son Taylor. His wife is Victoria Hodgson and they married in 2023. He lives in Onchan on the Isle of Man. His hobbies include motocross, trials and mountain biking. He supports hometown club Burnley F.C.

== Career ==
=== Early career ===
A schoolboy motocross rider from 1982 through 1989, Hodgson was voted Rider of the Year in 1986–87. Hodgson made the leap to road racing on Easter Sunday 1990 at a meeting at Langbaurgh (Teesside Autodrome), on a Yamaha TZR125. His first win was at the Three Sisters meeting in that same year. He came eighth in his first season in the British Clubman's Ministock. In 1992, he moved to the 125cc International Supercup, and became British National 125cc Champion at the age of 18. He was then selected to compete in the FIM World 125cc Championship as the youngest rider in the series and Britain's only representative in the class with Team Burnett (Roger Burnett), placing 24th in the Championship. In 1994, he was selected by HRC Honda as one of only five officially supported riders in 125cc World Championship with Team Burnett. He took part in two 500cc World Championship races for the Harris-Yamaha team.

=== 500cc World Championship (1995) ===
In 1995, Hodgson moved full-time to 500cc World Championship with WCM, developing a reputation for being a smooth but impetuous rider who crashed a lot – he came 11th in the Championship.

=== Superbike World Championship (1996–1998) ===
For 1996, Hodgson moved to the Superbike World Championship (aka 'WSBK') with Ducati, and this began a frustrating three-year spell in the series, the latter two years with Fuchs Kawasaki. 9th was Hodgson's best championship finish in this era. His first podium came at Laguna Seca Raceway in 1996.

=== British Superbike Championship (1999–2000) ===
For 1999, Hodgson returned to the British Superbike Championship (BSB) with GSE Racing, and spent the season re-establishing himself on a superbike and regaining his confidence. His teammate at GSE Racing Troy Bayliss took the British Superbike title. 2000 saw one of the most titanic battles British Superbike had ever seen, as Hodgson battled Chris Walker who was riding for Suzuki, all season long. The championship came down to the last race of the year at Donington Park, and for most of the race it looked like Walker would take the title. However, with just three laps to go, Walker's engine blew, allowing Hodgson to take the title. He also won two races of the British rounds of the Superbike World Championship that year as a 'wildcard' entry – one at Donington Park and one at Brands Hatch. The most memorable race of Hodgson's British Superbike title winning year was at Oulton Park, when he started race 1 from the back of the grid due after he stalled his bike, and ended up winning the race in breathtaking style, much to the amazement of the British crowd and his fellow competitors. The most controversial moment of the season came in race 2, when he and Walker came together on the final lap of the race battling for the win, resulting in Walker going down and Hodgson receiving a post-race penalty.

=== Return to Superbike (2001–2003) ===
GSE Racing stepped up to the Superbike World Championship series full-time for 2001, with Hodgson joined in the Ducati satellite team by up and coming English rider James Toseland. Hodgson was a race winner and fifth overall that year, while in 2002, Bayliss and Colin Edwards were dominant, although Neil took pole positions en route to third overall. After both Bayliss and Edwards left for MotoGP, Hodgson became the number one rider for the works Ducati team in 2003, winning the title against teammate Ruben Xaus.

=== MotoGP World Championship (2004) ===
For 2004, both Hodgson and Xaus went to Ducati's second-string MotoGP team, Team d'Antin Ducati. But the power delivery of the Desmosedici was extreme compared to a WSB Superbike, and the team had limited sponsorships and funds to run a test programme. Resultantly, Hodgson never felt he had the bike set up like he ever wanted it to be, while Xaus's natural extreme style appeared to get more out of the machine. Xaus ended up as rookie of the year, while a disillusioned Hodgson came 17th in the championship.

=== AMA Superbike Championship (2005–2009) ===
Hodgson at the time vowed never to return to MotoGP, stating that a combination of his age and nationality was now against him, and he would never be offered the best machinery capable of competing let alone winning. Having shown loyalty to Ducati throughout his motorcycle racing experience, the question now was where to place him. Ducati had a 'works' team focusing on making Régis Laconi the next WSB champion, and Hodgson didn't want to return to the Superbike World Championship in a satellite team, or to British Superbikes. Resultantly, with the stated aim of becoming the first rider to win all three Superbike titles of 'British', 'World' and 'American', he moved into the less-prestigious American Motorcyclist Association (AMA) championship in the United States for 2005 – he came sixth to Mat Mladin. Hodgson finished the 2006 AMA Superbike Championship in fifth place.

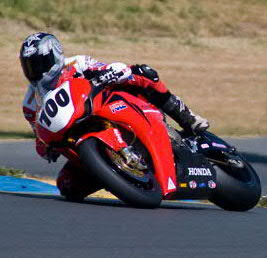
Neil Hodgson at Infineon Raceway, Sonoma, California, US in 2008

Ducati pulled out of the AMA Superbike Championship for at least the 2007 season, and Hodgson failed to obtain another ride as the 2007 Superbike World Championship opened. Hodgson was linked to joining Yamaha France from round 3 onwards, and to a temporary ride for Suzuki in WSBK. On 11 April, he was confirmed as a test and development rider for Ducati, replacing the injured Shinichi Ito. Rizla Suzuki gave Neil a test on the team's Suzuki GSX-R1000 for tests of the bike taking place at Cadwell Park, but despite speculation he was not intended to replace Chris Walker.

Hodgson returned to the AMA Superbike Championship for one round at Mazda Raceway Laguna Seca on a Corona Honda, partnering James Ellison, finishing fifth. At the Sachsenring MotoGP round, he was revealed to have rejected a chance to stand in for Toni Elías on a Gresini Honda at this race, as he thought that it would impact his chances of landing a full-time Superbike ride, probably with Ten Kate Honda after an earlier speculated deal to ride for Fogarty Racing on an MV Agusta dissipated. On 5 September 2007, Honda America announced that Hodgson would race for them in the 2008 AMA Superbike season, riding the new Fireblade.

In 2008, Hodgson came sixth in the AMA Superbike Championship, picking up two third-place finishes at Miller Motorsports Park. These were his best results of the season, towards the end of the season Hodgson became more inconsistent collecting low scores in one race of every round from 8–10. Hodgson signed a contract to keep him with the Corona Honda team for the 2009 season.

In 2009, Hodgson started the season off strongly with a second-place finish at the Daytona circuit. Hodgson then had an accident in training on a motocross bike, causing him to suffer a collapsed lung and a dislocated shoulder causing him to miss the next three rounds. Hodgson would eventually finish 11th on 167 points.

=== Return to British Superbikes (2010) ===
Hodgson confirmed that he would be returning to British Superbikes for the 2010 season, with Motorpoint Yamaha alongside youngster Dan Linfoot. On 22 April 2010, Hodgson announced that he was retiring from British superbikes and competitive motorcycle racing, due to the shoulder injury he picked up in a motocross accident during the previous AMA season. Hodgson had aggravated the injury in the first round of the British Superbike Championship at the Brands Hatch Indy circuit on 5 April. Hodgson was replaced in the Motorpoint Yamaha team by Ian Lowry.

== Support for charity ==
Hodgson is a patron of the National Association for Bikers with a Disability.

== Career statistics ==
=== Grand Prix motorcycle racing ===
==== Races by year ====
(key) (Races in bold indicate pole position, races in italics indicate fastest lap)

Year	Class	Bike	1	2	3	4	5	6	7	8	9	10	11	12	13	14	15	16	Pos	Pts
1992	125cc	Honda	JPN	AUS	MAL	SPA	ITA	EUR	GER	NED	HUN	FRA	GBR; 26	BRA	RSA				NC	0
1993	125cc	Honda	AUS; Ret	MAL; Ret	JPN; 16	SPA; 12	AUT; Ret	GER; 24	NED; 15	EUR; 19	RSM; 20	GBR; 10	CZE; 11	ITA; 15	USA; 15	FIM; Ret			24th	18
1994	125cc	Honda	AUS; Ret	MAL; 17	JPN; Ret	SPA; Ret	AUT; 27	GER; 16	NED; 18	ITA; Ret	FRA; 20	GBR; 21	CZE; Ret	USA; 22					NC	0
1994	500cc	Harris-Yamaha													ARG; 15	EUR; 16			32nd	1
1995	500cc	ROC-Yamaha	AUS; 20	MAL; Ret	JPN; 14	SPA; 12	GER; 14	ITA; 14	NED; 13	FRA; 8	GBR; 7								11th	54
1995	500cc	Yamaha										CZE; 10	BRA; 11	ARG; 10	EUR; 9				11th	54
2004	MotoGP	Ducati	RSA; Ret	SPA; Ret	FRA; Ret	ITA; 11	CAT; 12	NED; 10	BRA; 16	GER; 13	GBR; 10	CZE; 11	POR; Ret	JPN; 8	QAT; Ret	MAL; Ret	AUS; 18	VAL; 15	17th	38

=== Superbike World Championship ===
==== Races by year ====
(key) (Races in bold indicate pole position, races in italics indicate fastest lap)

Year	Bike	1		2		3		4		5		6		7		8		9		10		11		12		13		Pos	Pts
Year	Bike	R1	R2	R1	R2	R1	R2	R1	R2	R1	R2	R1	R2	R1	R2	R1	R2	R1	R2	R1	R2	R1	R2	R1	R2	R1	R2	Pos	Pts
1996	Ducati	SMR; 12	SMR; Ret	GBR; DNS	GBR; DNS	GER; DNS	GER; DNS	ITA; 6	ITA; 9	CZE; 11	CZE; 4	USA; 3	USA; 9	EUR; 8	EUR; Ret	INA; Ret	INA; 8	JPN; 13	JPN; 14	NED; 7	NED; 6	SPA; 8	SPA; 8	AUS; Ret	AUS; 12			10th	122
1997	Ducati	AUS; Ret	AUS; Ret	SMR; 7	SMR; 4	**GBR**; 4	**GBR**; 9	GER; 6	GER; 8	ITA	ITA	USA; Ret	USA; 9	EUR; 4	EUR; 6	AUT; 8	AUT; Ret	NED; 5	NED; 5	SPA; Ret	SPA; 8	JPN; 18	JPN; Ret	INA; Ret	INA; 7			9th	137
1998	Kawasaki	AUS; 8	AUS; Ret	GBR; 12	GBR; Ret	ITA; 4	ITA; 7	SPA; 7	SPA; 14	GER; Ret	GER; 11	SMR; 7	SMR; 8	RSA; Ret	RSA; Ret	USA; 9	USA; 6	EUR; Ret	EUR; 9	AUT; 8	AUT; 10	NED; 10	NED; 9	JPN; 6	JPN; 16			11th	124,5
2000	Ducati	RSA	RSA	AUS	AUS	JPN	JPN	GBR; 3	GBR; 1	ITA	ITA	GER	GER	SMR	SMR	SPA	SPA	USA	USA	**EUR**; 2	**EUR**; 1	NED	NED	GER	GER	**GBR**; 4	**GBR**; Ret	12th	99
2001	Ducati	SPA; Ret	SPA; 5	RSA; Ret	RSA; 4	AUS; 11	AUS; C	JPN; 7	JPN; 5	ITA; Ret	ITA; 7	GBR; 1	GBR; 2	**GER**; 8	**GER**; 2	**SMR**; 6	**SMR**; 16	USA; 2	USA; 3	**EUR**; 2	**EUR**; 2	**GER**; 7	**GER**; 10	NED; 5	NED; 5	ITA; 10	ITA; 7	5th	269
2002	Ducati	SPA; 6	SPA; 5	AUS; 5	AUS; 4	RSA; 5	RSA; 4	JPN; 4	JPN; 3	**ITA**; 2	**ITA**; 4	GBR; 3	GBR; 6	GER; Ret	GER; 8	SMR; 3	SMR; 4	USA; 5	USA; 3	**GBR**; 2	**GBR**; 3	**GER**; 3	**GER**; 3	NED; Ret	NED; 4	ITA; 4	ITA; 5	3rd	326
2003	Ducati	**SPA**; 1	**SPA**; 1	**AUS**; 1	**AUS**; 1	JPN; 1	JPN; 1	**ITA**; 1	**ITA**; 1	**GER**; 1	**GER**; 2	**GBR**; 1	**GBR**; 1	**SMR**; Ret	**SMR**; 2	USA; 2	USA; 2	GBR; 2	GBR; 5	NED; 2	NED; 1	ITA; 2	ITA; 4	FRA; 1	FRA; Ret			1st	489

=== MotoAmerica SuperBike Championship ===
Year	Class	Team	1	2		3		4		5		6		7	8		9		10		11		Pos	Pts
Year	Class	Team	R1	R1	R2	R1	R2	R1	R2	R1	R2	R1	R2	R1	R1	R2	R1	R2	R1	R2	R1	R2	Pos	Pts
2005	SuperBike	Ducati	DAY; 2	BAR; 4	BAR; 2	FON; 3	FON; 5	INF; 3	INF; 5	PPK; Ret		RAM; 1	RAM; 19	LAG; Ret	M-O; 5	M-O; 4	VIR; Ret	VIR; 5	RAT; 4	RAT; 3			6th	384
2006	SuperBike	Ducati	DAY; 4	BAR; 6	BAR; 5	FON; 5	FON; 5	INF; 5	INF; 4	RAM; 5	RAM; 4	MIL; 4	MIL; 6	LAG; 3	OHI; 16	OHI; 5	VIR; 3	VIR; Ret	RAT; 5	RAT; 4	OHI; 3		5th	469
2008	SuperBike	Honda	DAY; 7	BAR; 5	BAR; 5	FON; 4	FON; 4	INF; 6	INF; 5	MIL; 3	MIL; 3	RAM; 4	RAM; 4	LAG; 7	OHI; 22	OHI; 4	VIR; 20	VIR; 6	RAT; 21	RAT; 7	LAG; 5		6th	419
2009	SuperBike	Honda	DAY; 2	FON	FON	RAT	RAT	BAR	BAR	INF; 23	INF; 9	RAM; 16	RAM; 6	LAG; 6	OHI; 11	OHI; 9	HRT; 10	HRT; 6	VIR; 11	VIR; 8	NJE; 13	NJE; 5	11th	167

=== British Superbike Championship ===
==== By year ====
(key) (Races in bold indicate pole position; races in italics indicate fastest lap)

Year	Make	1			2			3			4			5			6			7			8			9			10			11			12			Pos	Pts
Year	Make	R1	R2	R3	R1	R2	R3	R1	R2	R3	R1	R2	R3	R1	R2	R3	R1	R2	R3	R1	R2	R3	R1	R2	R3	R1	R2	R3	R1	R2	R3	R1	R2	R3	R1	R2	R3	Pos	Pts
2010	Yamaha	BHI; DNS	BHI; DNS		THR	THR		OUL	OUL		CAD	CAD		MAL	MAL		KNO	KNO		SNE	SNE	SNE	BHGP	BHGP	BHGP	CAD	CAD		CRO	CRO		SIL	SIL		OUL	OUL	OUL	NC	0

== Bibliography ==
- Hodgson, Neil; Bramwell, Neil (1 December 2001). Neil Hodgson: Back on Track. Collins Willow. ISBN 978-0007126460.
