= 1994 European motorcycle Grand Prix =

(Europe) 1994 European Grand Prix
Race details
- Race 14 of 14 races in the 1994 Grand Prix motorcycle racing season
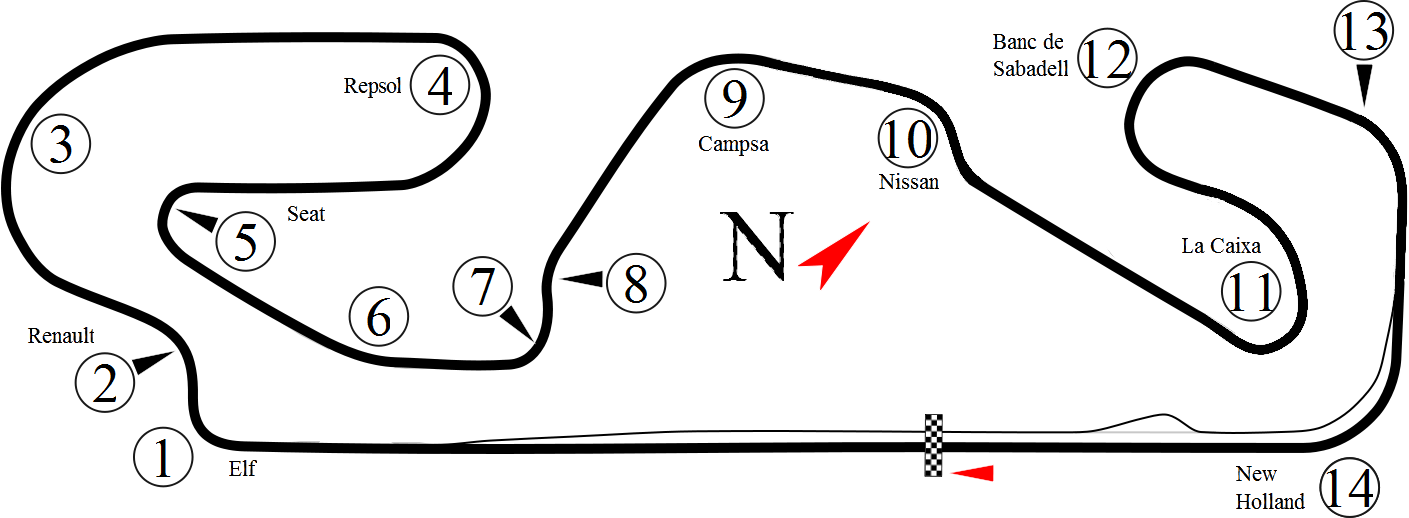
- Date: 9 October 1994
- Official name: Gran Premi Pepsi d'Europa
- Location: Circuit de Catalunya
- Course: Permanent racing facility; 4.747 km (2.950 mi)

MotoGP
Pole position
- Rider: (Italy) Luca Cadalora
- Time: 1:47.918
Fastest lap
- Rider: (Australia) Mick Doohan
- Time: 1:49.452
Podium
- First: (Italy) Luca Cadalora
- Second: (Australia) Mick Doohan
- Third: (United States) John Kocinski

250cc
Pole position
- Rider: (Italy) Max Biaggi
- Time: 1:49.942
Fastest lap
- Rider: (Italy) Loris Capirossi
- Time: 1:50.362
Podium
- First: (Italy) Max Biaggi
- Second: (Italy) Loris Capirossi
- Third: (Italy) Doriano Romboni

125cc
Pole position
- Rider: (Germany) Dirk Raudies
- Time: 1:56.673
Fastest lap
- Rider: (Germany) Peter Öttl
- Time: 1:56.514
Podium
- First: (Germany) Dirk Raudies
- Second: (Germany) Peter Öttl
- Third: (Japan) Haruchika Aoki

The 1994 European motorcycle Grand Prix was the last round of the 1994 Grand Prix motorcycle racing season. It took place on 9 October 1994 at the Circuit de Catalunya.

== 500 cc classification ==
Pos.	Rider	Team	Manufacturer	Time/Retired	Points
1	(Italy) Luca Cadalora	Marlboro Team Roberts	Yamaha	46:03.356	25
2	(Australia) Mick Doohan	Honda Team HRC	Honda	+3.488	20
3	(United States) John Kocinski	Cagiva Team Agostini	Cagiva	+6.566	16
4	(Spain) Àlex Crivillé	Honda Team HRC	Honda	+7.486	13
5	(Australia) Daryl Beattie	Marlboro Team Roberts	Yamaha	+18.737	11
6	(Brazil) Alex Barros	Lucky Strike Suzuki	Suzuki	+19.994	10
7	(Spain) Alberto Puig	Ducados Honda Pons	Honda	+24.528	9
8	(United Kingdom) Niall Mackenzie	Slick 50 Team WCM	ROC Yamaha	+34.978	8
9	(France) Bernard Garcia	Yamaha Motor France	ROC Yamaha	+54.900	7
10	(United States) Doug Chandler	Cagiva Team Agostini	Cagiva	+55.928	6
11	(United Kingdom) John Reynolds	Padgett's Motorcycles	Harris Yamaha	+55.987	5
12	(United Kingdom) Jeremy McWilliams	Millar Racing	Yamaha	+56.278	4
13	(Spain) Juan Lopez Mella	Lucky Strike Suzuki	Suzuki	+1:10.840	3
14	(Belgium) Laurent Naveau	Euro Team	ROC Yamaha	+1:10.958	2
15	(New Zealand) Andrew Stroud	Team ROC	ROC Yamaha	+1:11.059	1
16	(United Kingdom) Neil Hodgson	Shell Harris Grand Prix	Harris Yamaha	+1:11.281	
17	(France) Jean Pierre Jeandat	JPJ Racing	ROC Yamaha	+1:11.374	
18	(Italy) Cristiano Migliorati	Team Pedercini	Yamaha	+1:33.939	
19	(Netherlands) Cees Doorakkers	Team Doorakkers	Harris Yamaha	+1 Lap	
20	(Switzerland) Bernard Haenggeli	Haenggeli Racing	ROC Yamaha	+1 Lap	
Ret	(Japan) Shinichi Itoh	Honda Team HRC	Honda	Retirement	
Ret	(Luxembourg) Andreas Leuthe	Team Doppler Austria	ROC Yamaha	Retirement	
Ret	(United Kingdom) Kevin Mitchell	MBM Racing	Harris Yamaha	Retirement	
Ret	(France) Bruno Bonhuil	MTD Objectif 500	ROC Yamaha	Retirement	
Ret	(Italy) Loris Reggiani	Aprilia Racing Team	Aprilia	Retirement	
Ret	(France) Marc Garcia	DR Team Shark	ROC Yamaha	Retirement	
Ret	(United Kingdom) Sean Emmett	Lucky Strike Suzuki	Suzuki	Retirement	
Ret	(Italy) Marco Papa	Team Elit	ROC Yamaha	Retirement	
Ret	(Italy) Vittorio Scatola	Team Paton	Paton	Retirement	
Ret	(Italy) Lucio Pedercini	Team Pedercini	ROC Yamaha	Retirement	
DNS	(France) Jean Foray	Jean Foray Racing Team	ROC Yamaha	Did not start	

== 250 cc classification ==
Pos	Rider	Manufacturer	Time/Retired	Points
1	(Italy) Max Biaggi	Aprilia	42:44.818	25
2	(Italy) Loris Capirossi	Honda	+1.940	20
3	(Italy) Doriano Romboni	Honda	+2.608	16
4	(Japan) Tadayuki Okada	Honda	+3.056	13
5	(Japan) Tetsuya Harada	Yamaha	+4.229	11
6	(France) Jean Philippe Ruggia	Aprilia	+18.493	10
7	(Germany) Ralf Waldmann	Honda	+22.068	9
8	(France) Jean-Michel Bayle	Aprilia	+22.150	8
9	(Spain) Carlos Checa	Honda	+31.157	7
10	(Switzerland) Adrien Bosshard	Honda	+32.038	6
11	(United States) Kenny Roberts, Jr.	Yamaha	+34.323	5
12	(Netherlands) Wilco Zeelenberg	Honda	+39.905	4
13	(Spain) Luis Maurel	Honda	+56.598	3
14	(Spain) Miguel Angel Castilla	Yamaha	+56.736	2
15	(Austria) Andreas Preining	Aprilia	+59.510	1
16	(Italy) Giuseppe Fiorillo	Honda	+59.612	
17	(Netherlands) Jurgen vd Goorbergh	Aprilia	+1:05.563	
18	(Spain) Juan Borja	Honda	+1:09.224	
19	(Germany) Adolf Stadler	Honda	+1:09.272	
20	(Germany) Jürgen Fuchs	Honda	+1:09.305	
21	(Spain) Sete Gibernau	Yamaha	+1:09.536	
22	(Netherlands) Patrick vd Goorbergh	Aprilia	+1:22.673	
23	(Spain) Enrique de Juan	Aprilia	+1:40.532	
24	(United Kingdom) James Haydon	Honda	+1:48.090	
25	(Finland) Krisse Kaas	Yamaha	+1 Lap	
Ret	(Japan) Nobuatsu Aoki	Honda	Retirement	
Ret	(Switzerland) Eskil Suter	Aprilia	Retirement	
Ret	(France) Chrisrian Boudinot	Aprilia	Retirement	
Ret	(Spain) Manuel Hernandez	Aprilia	Retirement	
Ret	(Italy) Alessandro Gramigni	Aprilia	Retirement	
Ret	(France) Frederic Protat	Honda	Retirement	
Ret	(Canada) Rodney Fee	Honda	Retirement	
Ret	(France) Noel Ferro	Honda	Retirement	
Ret	(Spain) José Luis Cardoso	Aprilia	Retirement	

== 125 cc classification ==
Pos	Rider	Manufacturer	Time/Retired	Points
1	(Germany) Dirk Raudies	Honda	43:26.974	25
2	(Germany) Peter Öttl	Aprilia	+2.137	20
3	(Japan) Haruchika Aoki	Honda	+4.956	16
4	(Japan) Takeshi Tsujimura	Honda	+5.001	13
5	(Switzerland) Olivier Petrucciani	Aprilia	+6.779	11
6	(Japan) Noboru Ueda	Honda	+12.491	10
7	(Japan) Kazuto Sakata	Aprilia	+12.643	9
8	(Japan) Hideyuki Nakajo	Honda	+12.679	8
9	(Netherlands) Loek Bodelier	Honda	+12.864	7
10	(Italy) Fausto Gresini	Honda	+12.964	6
11	(Italy) Gianluigi Scalvini	Aprilia	+13.114	5
12	(Japan) Yoshiaki Katoh	Yamaha	+18.803	4
13	(Japan) Masaki Tokudome	Honda	+40.641	3
14	(Italy) Lucio Cecchinello	Honda	+43.115	2
15	(Japan) Tomoko Igata	Honda	+43.126	1
16	(Italy) Vittorio Lopez	Honda	+55.928	
17	(United Kingdom) Darren Barton	Honda	+56.198	
18	(Spain) Andres Sanchez	Honda	+56.876	
19	(Germany) Manfred Geissler	Aprilia	+1:04.356	
20	(Germany) Stefan Prein	Yamaha	+1:12.746	
21	(France) Frederic Petit	Yamaha	+1:13.290	
22	(Netherlands) Hans Spaan	Honda	+1:18.267	
23	(Italy) Max Gambino	Aprilia	+1:22.416	
24	(Japan) Katsuyoshi Takahashi	Honda	+1:45.934	
Ret	(Germany) Maik Stief	Aprilia	Retirement	
Ret	(Japan) Akira Saito	Honda	Retirement	
Ret	(Spain) Carlos Giro	Aprilia	Retirement	
Ret	(Spain) Jorge Martinez	Yamaha	Retirement	
Ret	(Spain) Herri Torrontegui	Aprilia	Retirement	
Ret	(Germany) Oliver Koch	Honda	Retirement	
Ret	(Italy) Stefano Perugini	Aprilia	Retirement	
Ret	(Spain) Emilio Alzamora	Honda	Retirement	
Ret	(France) Nicolas Dussauge	Honda	Retirement	
Ret	(Italy) Gabriele Debbia	Honda	Retirement	
Ret	(Austria) Manfred Baumann	Yamaha	Retirement	

Previous race: 1994 Argentine Grand Prix	FIM Grand Prix World Championship; 1994 season	Next race: 1995 Australian Grand Prix
Previous race: 1993 European Grand Prix	European Grand Prix	Next race: 1995 European Grand Prix
