= Fausto Gresini =

Italian motorcycle racer (1961–2021)

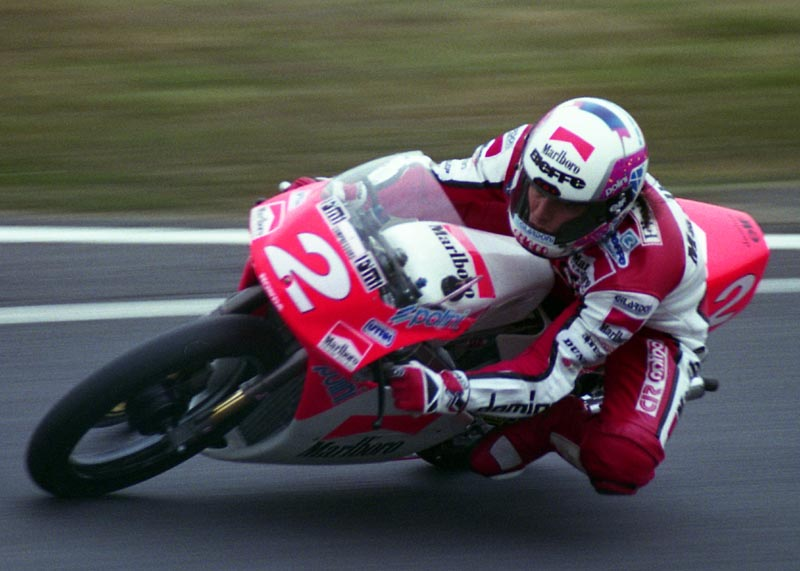
- Gresini at the 1992 Japanese Grand Prix.
- Nationality: Italian
- Born: 23 January 1961; Imola, Italy
- Died: 23 February 2021 (aged 60); Bologna, Italy
Motorcycle racing career statistics
Grand Prix motorcycle racing
Active years	1983 - 1994
First race	1983 125cc Nations Grand Prix
Last race	1994 125cc European Grand Prix
First win	1984 125cc Swedish Grand Prix
Last win	1992 125cc British Grand Prix
Team(s)	Garelli, Honda
Championships	125cc - 1985, 1987
Starts / Wins / Podiums / Poles / F. laps / Points; 132 / 21 / 47 / 17 / 13 / 1093

Fausto Gresini (23 January 1961 – 23 February 2021) was an Italian professional motorcycle road racer and racing team manager. He competed in Grand Prix motorcycle racing from 1983 to 1994, most prominently as a two-time 125cc world champion riding for the Garelli factory racing team.

After his racing career, Gresini formed the Gresini Racing team, which he operated until his death from COVID-19 in 2021.

== Motorcycle racing career ==
Gresini was born at Imola. He began racing in 1978 at the age of 17 on a Minarelli 50 in Italy, and in 1983 he joined the Grand Prix circuit with the MBA team.

During his riding career, Gresini won two world championship titles in the 125cc class in 1985 and 1987. He was vice-champion in the 125cc class in 1986 aboard a Garelli and in 1991 and 1992 with Honda. He accumulated 21 victories and raced in 132 Grand Prix with 15 second places and 11 third places. He is tied with Ángel Nieto for the record of 11 consecutive victories in the 125 class, accomplished across 1986 and 1987. He holds the record of the most 125cc victories in one season with ten in 1987 - he crashed in the final race but won all others.

== Racing team management career ==
Gresini founded the Gresini Racing team in 1997 with partner Fabrizio Cecchini as the technical director, and served as its team principal until his death. His team has won three world championships: Daijiro Kato in the 2001 250cc world championship, Toni Elías in the 2010 Moto2 world championship, and Jorge Martín in the 2018 Moto3 world championship. The team also took the inaugural MotoE World Cup in 2019 with rider Matteo Ferrari.

Gresini experienced two tragedies during his tenure as team principal. Daijiro Kato died in hospital two weeks after crashing during the 2003 Japanese Grand Prix on 6 April 2003. On 23 October 2011, the Gresini team suffered another loss when rider Marco Simoncelli died soon after an accident at the Malaysian Grand Prix. The team's other rider at the time was Hiroshi Aoyama.

== Death ==
On 27 December 2020, Gresini was hospitalized at the Ospedale Maggiore in Bologna after contracting COVID-19 amid the COVID-19 pandemic in Italy. After an apparent initial improvement in his condition, on 18 February 2021, he worsened with a serious lung infection. He died in hospital from the illness' complications on 23 February 2021, at the age of 60, one month after his birthday.

== Grand Prix career statistics ==
Points system from 1969 to 1987.

**Position**	1	2	3	4	5	6	7	8	9	10
**Points**	15	12	10	8	6	5	4	3	2	1

Points system from 1988 to 1992

**Position**	1	2	3	4	5	6	7	8	9	10	11	12	13	14	15
**Points**	20	17	15	13	11	10	9	8	7	6	5	4	3	2	1

Points system from 1993 onwards.

**Position**	1	2	3	4	5	6	7	8	9	10	11	12	13	14	15
**Points**	25	20	16	13	11	10	9	8	7	6	5	4	3	2	1

(key) (Races in bold indicate pole position; races in italics indicate fastest lap)

Year	Class	Team	1	2	3	4	5	6	7	8	9	10	11	12	13	14	Points	Rank	Wins
1983	125cc	MBA	FRA; NC	NAT; 7	GER; 6	ESP; 6	AUT; 4	**YUG**; NC	NED; 10	BEL; 9	GBR; 6	SWE; 2	RSM; NC				37	9th	0
1984	125cc	MBA	NAT; NC	ESP; NC	GER; 4												51	**3rd**	1
1984	125cc	Garelli				FRA; 4	NED; NC	GBR; 3	SWE; 1	RSM; 3							51	**3rd**	1
1985	125cc	Garelli	ESP; 2	GER; 2	NAT; NC	AUT; 1	**NED**; 3	**BEL**; 1	**FRA**; 2	GBR; 4	**SWE**; 3	**RSM**; 1					109	**1st**	3
1986	125cc	Garelli	**ESP**; 1	**NAT**; 1	GER; 2	AUT; NC	NED; 2	BEL; 4	FRA; 2	GBR; NC	SWE; 1	**RSM**; 3	**BWU**; 1				114	**2nd**	4
1987	125cc	Garelli	ESP; 1	**GER**; 1	NAT; 1	AUT; 1	NED; 1	**FRA**; 1	GBR; 1	**SWE**; 1	**CZE**; 1	**RSM**; 1	**POR**; DNF				150	**1st**	10
1988	125cc	Garelli	ESP; 4	NAT; NC	GER -	AUT -	NED; NC	BEL -	YUG -	FRA -	GBR; 7	SWE; NC	CZE; NC				22	21st	0
1989	125cc	Aprilia	JPN; 11	AUS; 7	ESP; 5	NAT; 3	GER; NC	AUT; 5	NED; 6	BEL; 7	FRA; 5	GBR; 8	SWE; 5	CZE; 14			102	5th	0
1990	125cc	Honda	JPN; 7	ESP; 3	NAT; NC	GER -	AUT; NC	YUG; 6	NED; 8	BEL; 8	FRA; NC	GBR; 8	SWE; 5	CZE; 7	HUN; 4	AUS; 5	102	8th	0
1991	125cc	Honda	JPN; 2	AUS; 2	ESP; 2	**ITA**; 1	GER; NC	AUT; 1	EUR; 2	NED; 4	FRA; 3	GBR; 2	RSM; 3	CZE; 6	MAL; 4		181	**2nd**	2
1992	125cc	Honda	JPN; NC	AUS; 5	MAL; 8	ESP; 2	ITA; 5	EUR; 3	GER; 2	NED; 2	HUN; 3	FRA; NC	GBR; 1	BRA; 6	RSA; 7		118	**2nd**	1
1993	125cc	Honda	AUS; 5	MAL; 8	JPN; NC	ESP; NC	AUT; 8	GER; 17	NED; DNF	EUR; 17	RSM; 10	GBR; 7	CZE -	ITA; 10	USA; 16	FIM; 4	61	11th	0
1994	125cc	Honda	AUS; 4	MAL; 6	JPN; 18	ESP; DNF	AUT; 8	GER; 13	NED; 16	ITA; 17	FRA; 10	GBR; 20	CZE -	USA; DNS	ARG; NC	EUR; 10	46	16th	0

== See also ==
Gresini Racing
