= Bryan Houghton =

English Catholic priest (1911-1992)

Bryan Houghton (1911-1992) was an English Catholic priest. A Traditionalist Catholic, Houghton was opposed to the reforms of Vatican II, on which he wrote many books.

== Youth and conversion ==
Bryan Houghton was born into a wealthy British Anglican family. When he was young he was sent to a boarding school in France. At the age of nine he had a Catholic friend who became an influence on his life. Houghton said that in Protestant churches they talk about Jesus and his friend replied: "That's it, it talks about Jesus. They were surely very beautiful. But this is not the Mass. The Mass is Jesus". This was life-changing for Houghton and led him to convert to Roman Catholicism. Two years later, he went to Rome to train as a priest.

== Priest, but isolated ==
Houghton was ordained on 30 March 1940 and was for 29 years pastor of two English parishes: first he was appointed to Slough in a popular neighborhood, he created the Saint Anthony Parish, and lead a prayerful and devout community.

In September 1954, he was sent to Bury St Edmunds and as parish priest. From the early 1960s, he was in conflict with Catholic reformers. On 29 November 1969, Advent Sunday, he resigned the parish, refusing to modify his practices after the liturgical reform. With the advantage of inherited wealth, Houghton relocated to the south of France, an area he had known since his youth. He settled in the region of Viviers, purchasing a property and a chapel (Our Lady of the Rose) in which, with the permission of the bishop, he continued to celebrate the Tridentine Mass until his death on 19 November 1992. He rests in the cemetery of Viviers (Ardèche).

== Committed writer ==
In the 1960s, he spoke regularly at conferences and contributed incisive interventions to journals, citing evidence of "conversion by the Mass."

Maintaining fidelity to the Pope and the Old Mass, Father Hougthon was far from following Monsignor Marcel Lefebvre and his first book, The Peace of Monsignor Forester in 1982, established his distance from the founder of Society of Saint Pius X. This novel contained "liturgical peace proposals," which, which though not immediately followed, are similar to the situation in late 2006. He became a good friend of Le Barroux Abbey.

In one of his articles he reviewed a book by Cardinal Ratzinger, and Houghton wrote to the cardinal in 1986, saying: "There is no doubt that he has the makings of a great man."

== Books ==
=== Titles ===
- 1982 The Peace of Monsignor Forester, DMM (Bouère, €20; 244P)
- 1984 Marriage of Judith, DMM: exhausted
- 1990 Priest Rejected, DMM: exhausted
- 1994 Marriage of Judith - New revised edition, DMM (Bouère, €20; 244P)
- 2005 Priest Rejected - New revised and extended edition of 27 items, DMM (Bouère 24 €; 320p)

=== Text ===
- 1979 Mitre and Crook (Catholic Traditionalist Classics)
- 1987 Irreligion, DMM (Bouère, F; 44p): exhausted
