= Robin Appleyard =

British motorcycle racer

- Nationality: (United Kingdom) British
- Born: 10 May 1964 (age 62); Shipley, Yorkshire
Motorcycle racing career statistics
Grand Prix motorcycle racing
Active years	1983–1992, 1996
First race	1983 125cc British Grand Prix
Last race	1996 125cc British Grand Prix
Starts / Wins / Podiums / Poles / F. laps / Points; 82 / 0 / 0 / 0 / 0 / 56

Robin Appleyard (born 10 May 1964) is a British former professional motorcycle racer and race team manager. He competed in the 125cc class of Grand Prix motorcycle racing full time from 1985 to 1992. He competed in British Championship 1993~1998. Retiring in ‘98.

Appleyard was born in Shipley, Yorkshire. He won the 125cc Marlboro Clubman's British Championship in 1982, the Shell Oils Championship in 1984, British Super-cup 125cc Championship twice (1993, 1996) and was 125cc National Cup champion in 1995.

When his own racing career was over, Appleyard moved into team management, where he was the original Red Bull Rookie manager. He managed Team Appleyard/Macadam Yamaha, finishing the team in 2022 winning British SuperSport Championships in 2017, 2018, 2019, and 2020. winning 63 British Championship races with Keith Farmer, Jack Kennedy, Rory Skinner, Brad Perie, and Brad Jones.
