= Takuma Aoki =

Japanese motorcycle racer

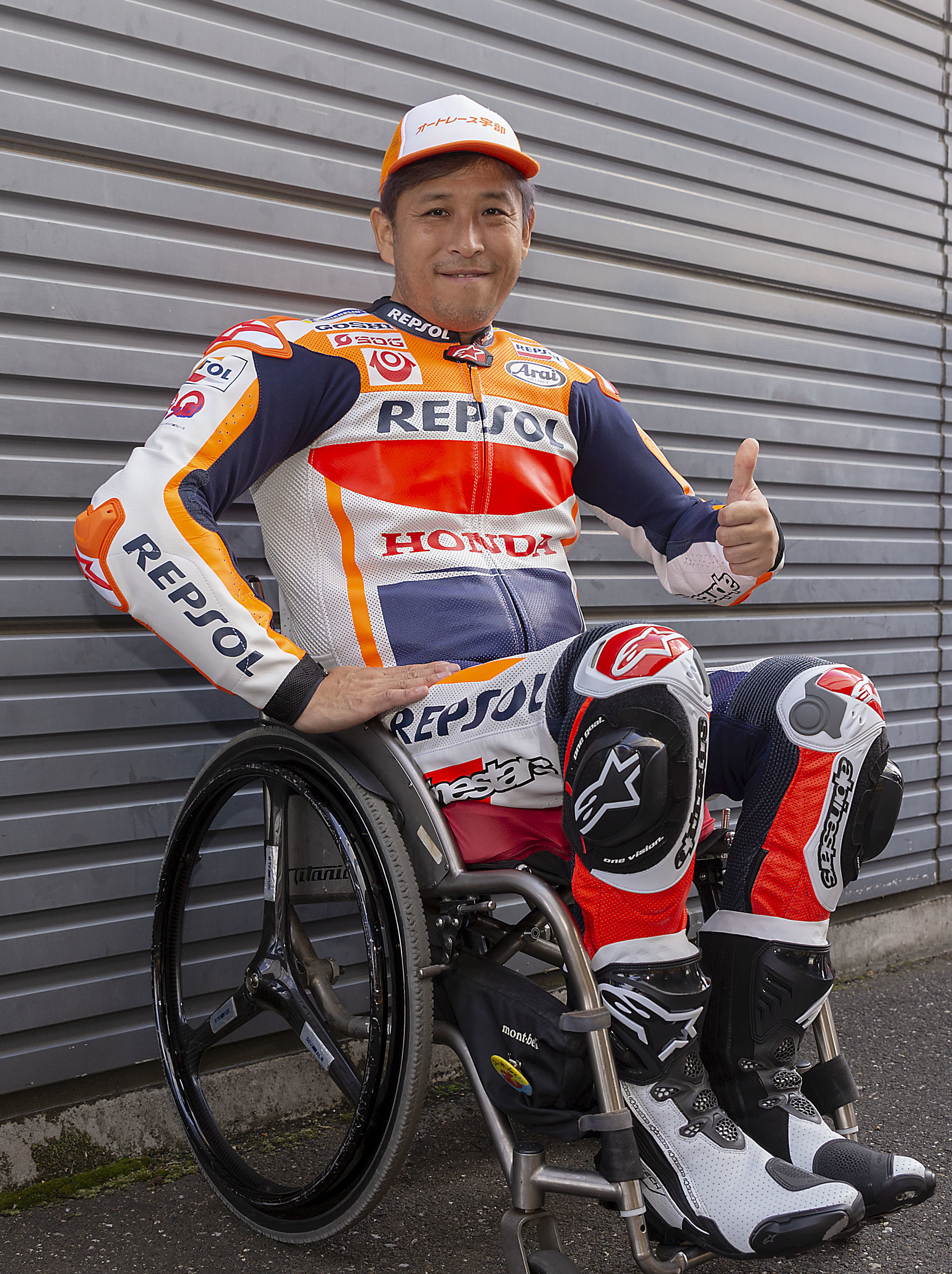
- Aoki in 2019
- Nationality: Japanese
Motorcycle racing career statistics
Grand Prix motorcycle racing
Active years	1993 - 1997
First race	1993 250cc Japanese Grand Prix
Last race	1997 500cc Australian Grand Prix
Team	Honda
Starts / Wins / Podiums / Poles / F. laps / Points; 18 / 0 / 4 / 0 / 0 / 169

Takuma Aoki (青木 拓磨, Aoki Takuma; born February 24, 1974 in Tokyo) is a Japanese former road racer of motorcycles at Grand Prix level. He began his Grand Prix career in 1993. From 1994 to 1996, Aoki competed in the World Superbike Championship, winning one race in that series. In 1996, he won All Japan Championship Superbike class champion. He returned to Grand Prix racing with Honda in 1997, enjoying his best season when he finished fifth in the 500cc world championship. A spinal injury in a 1998 motorcycle crash left him paralyzed below the waist. Aoki has continued to work with Honda, helping them develop cars for disabled people. He is the brother of Grand Prix racers, Nobuatsu and Haruchika Aoki.

Aoki has been involved in motorsports again. Using specially-modified 4-wheel drive vehicles, he has been involved in many cross country rallies, notably the Dakar Rally, the Jaguar I-Pace eTrophy and the Asia Cross Country Rally.

On July 10, 2019, Aoki took a test ride on the Team Honda Dream CBR1000 Suzuka 8 Hours machine. In 2021, Aoki competed in the 24 Hours of Le Mans as part of Frédéric Sausset's SRT41 team.

== Career statistics ==
=== Grand Prix motorcycle racing ===
==== Races by year ====
(key) (Races in bold indicate pole position, races in italics indicate fastest lap)

Year	Class	Bike	1	2	3	4	5	6	7	8	9	10	11	12	13	14	15	Pos.	Pts
1993	250cc	Honda	AUS	MAL	JPN; 8	SPA	AUT	GER	NED	EUR	RSM	GBR	CZE	ITA	USA	FIM		24th	8
1994	250cc	Honda	AUS	MAL	JPN; 5	SPA	AUT	GER	NED	ITA	FRA	GBR	CZE	USA	ARG	EUR		20th	11
1995	500cc	Honda	AUS	MAL	JPN; 3	SPA	GER	ITA	NED	FRA	GBR	CZE	BRA	ARG	EUR			23rd	16
1996	500cc	Honda	MAL	INA	JPN; Ret	SPA	ITA	FRA	NED	GER	GBR	AUT	CZE	IMO	CAT	BRA	AUS	NC	0
1997	500cc	Honda	MAL; 5	JPN; 4	SPA; 4	ITA; Ret	AUT; Ret	FRA; 5	NED; Ret	IMO; 3	GER; 3	BRA; DNS	GBR; 10	CZE; 6	CAT; 7	INA; 7	AUS; 2	5th	134

=== Superbike World Championship ===
==== Races by year ====
Year	Make	1		2		3		4		5		6		7		8		9		10		11		12		Pos.	Pts
Year	Make	R1	R2	R1	R2	R1	R2	R1	R2	R1	R2	R1	R2	R1	R2	R1	R2	R1	R2	R1	R2	R1	R2	R1	R2	Pos.	Pts
1994	Honda	GBR	GBR	GER	GER	ITA	ITA	SPA	SPA	AUT	AUT	INA	INA	JPN; 7	JPN; 8	NED	NED	SMR	SMR	EUR	EUR	AUS	AUS			31st	17
1995	Honda	GER	GER	SMR	SMR	GBR	GBR	ITA	ITA	SPA	SPA	AUT	AUT	USA	USA	EUR	EUR	JPN; Ret	JPN; 7	NED	NED	INA	INA	AUS	AUS	31st	9
1996	Honda	SMR	SMR	GBR	GBR	GER	GER	ITA	ITA	CZE	CZE	USA	USA	EUR	EUR	INA	INA	JPN; 11	JPN; 1	NED	NED	SPA	SPA	AUS	AUS	19th	30

=== Complete Jaguar I-Pace eTrophy results ===
(key) (Races in bold indicate pole position)

Year	Team	Car	Class	1	2	3	4	5	6	7	8	9	10	D.C.	Points
2019–20	Team Yokohama Challenge	Jaguar I-PACE eTROPHY	P	ADR	ADR	MEX; 5^{3}	BER; 9^{7}	BER; 9^{7}	BER; 7^{6}	BER; 8^{7}	BER; 7^{5}	BER; 9^{7}	BER; 7^{7}	6th	42

=== Complete 24 Hours of Le Mans results ===
Year	Team	Co-Drivers	Car	Class	Laps	Pos.	Class Pos.
2021	(France) Association SRT41	(Belgium) Nigel Bailly (France) Matthieu Lahaye	Oreca 07-Gibson	Innovative	334	32nd	–
