= 1993 Grand Prix motorcycle racing season =

Sports season

1993 World Champions

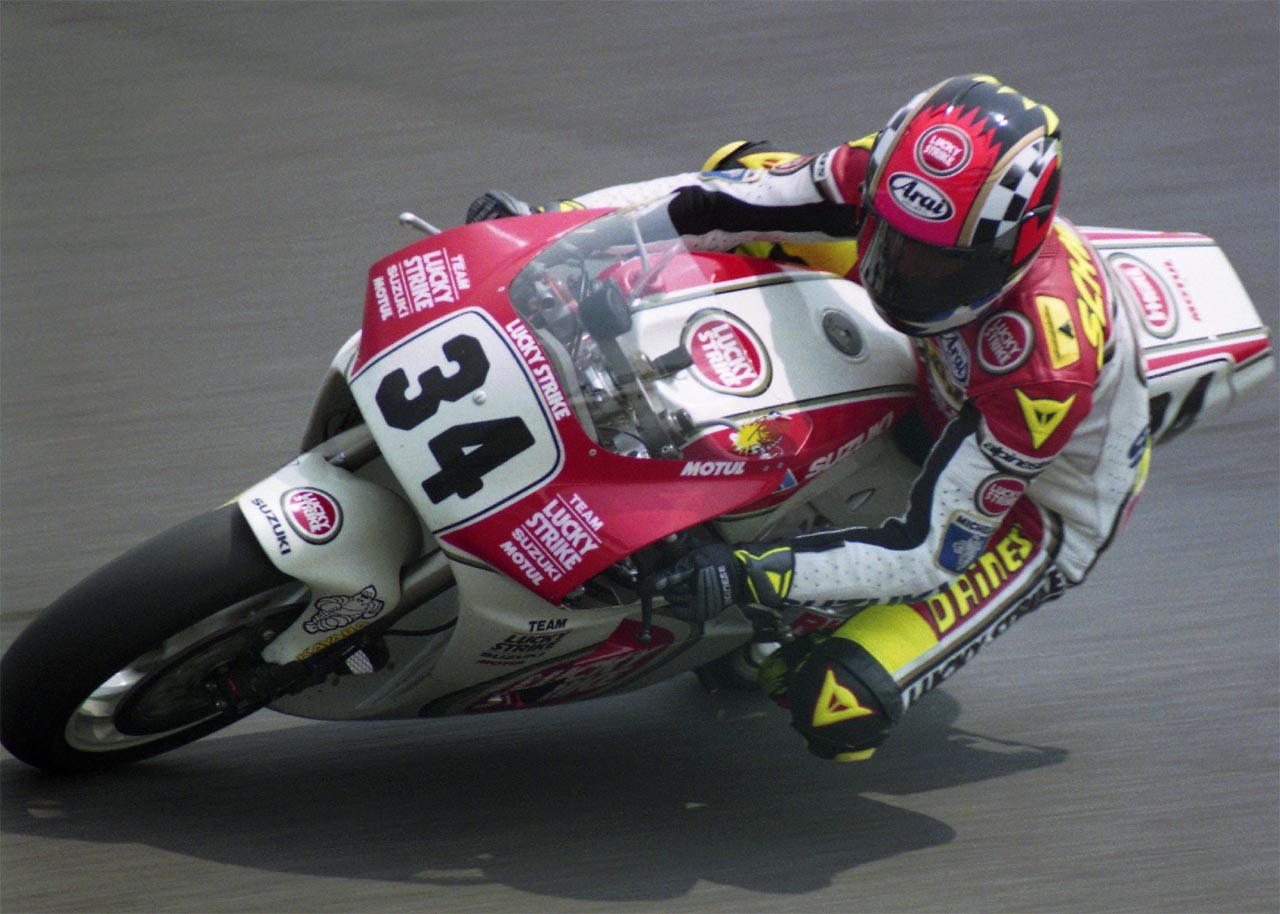
Kevin Schwantz (pictured at Suzuka) became the 500cc world champion

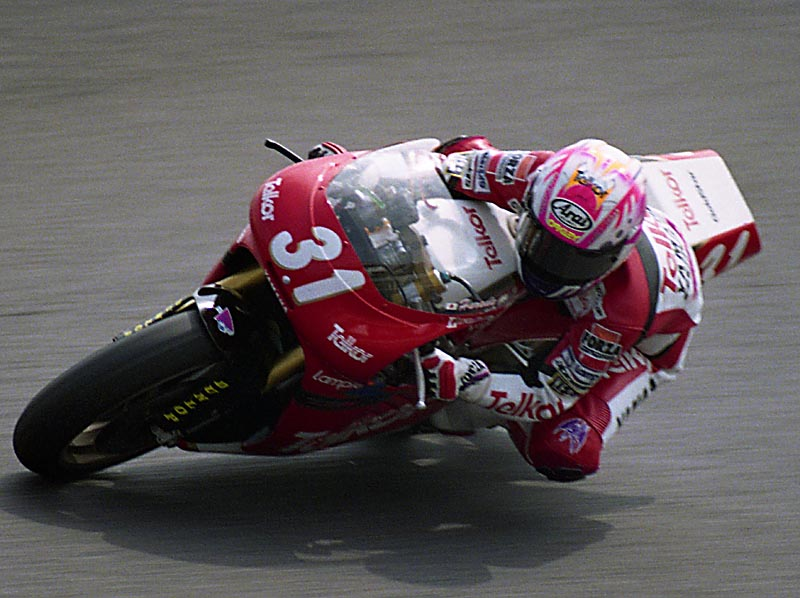
Tetsuya Harada (pictured at Suzuka) became the 250cc world champion

The 1993 Grand Prix motorcycle racing season was the 45th F.I.M. Road Racing World Championship season.

== Season summary ==
Kevin Schwantz won the 500cc 1993 world championship in a season marred by the tragic end to his rival Wayne Rainey's career. Schwantz started the season strongly with four wins by the midpoint of the season. With three races remaining, Rainey had battled back to take the championship points lead while Schwantz nursed a wrist injury. At the Italian Grand Prix, Rainey had just taken the lead and was pulling away when he fell. He suffered serious spinal injuries and would never walk again. Rainey's accident marked the end of an era of American domination in Grand Prix racing.

Newcomers Daryl Beattie and Alex Barros took their first wins (Barros after twice crashing out of the lead) while Mick Doohan struggled to recover from his serious leg injuries. Freddie Spencer made one more comeback attempt but crashed in two of the first three rounds. Honda entered factory test rider Shinichi Itoh on a third bike with development parts, rumored to include electronic fuel injection, as he was noticeably faster in a straight line that the other Honda riders. When Itoh broke the 200 mph barrier at Hockenheim, it gave credence to these rumors. Officially, all three bikes gained the injection system at the same time

A new star emerged on the 250 scene with Tetsuya Harada taking the crown in a tight battle with Loris Capirossi. German privateer, Dirk Raudies won the 125 crown with 9 victories on a Honda.

The 1993 season also marks the last time a rider is allowed to compete in two different classes at the same race.

== 1993 Grand Prix season calendar ==
The following Grands Prix were scheduled to take place in 1993:

| Round | Date | Grand Prix | Circuit |
|---|---|---|---|
| 1 | 28 March | (Australia) Foster's Australian Motorcycle Grand Prix | Eastern Creek Raceway |
| 2 | 4 April | Malaysia Grand Prix | Shah Alam Circuit |
| 3 | 18 April | (Japan) Marlboro GP | Suzuka Circuit |
| 4 | 2 May | (Spain) Gran Premio de España Ducados | Circuito Permanente de Jerez |
| 5 | 16 May | (Austria) Austrian Grand Prix | Salzburgring |
| 6 | 13 June | (Germany) Grand Prix von Deutschland | Hockenheimring |
| 7 | 26 June | (Netherlands) Lucky Strike Dutch Grand Prix | TT Circuit Assen |
| 8 | 4 July | (Europe) Gran Premi Pepsi d'Europa | Circuit de Catalunya |
| 9 | 18 July | Gran Premio di San Marino | Mugello Circuit |
| 10 | 1 August | (United Kingdom) British Grand Prix | Donington Park |
| 11 | 22 August | (Czech Republic) Grand Prix České republiky | Brno Circuit |
| 12 | 5 September | (Italy) Gran Premio d'Italia | Circuito Internazionale Santa Monica |
| 13 | 12 September | United States Motorcycle Grand Prix | Laguna Seca Raceway |
| 14 | 26 September | Gran Premio FIM de la Comunidad de Madrid | Circuito Permanente Del Jarama |

=== Calendar changes ===
- The Australian Grand Prix replaced the Japanese Grand Prix with hosting the opening round.
- The Hungarian, French (which was held at the Magny-Cours circuit) and Brazilian Grand Prix (which was held at the Interlagos circuit) were taken off the calendar after Bernie Ecclestone focused his interest completely on Formula 1 again. The French returned on 1994 in Circuit Bugatti, Le Mans.
- The Austrian, San Marino, Czech Republic (before called the Czechoslovak Grand Prix) and United States Grand Prix returned on the calendar after the shift of interest to Formula 1 by Bernie Ecclestone.
- The Canadian Grand Prix was initially scheduled to be held on 19 September, but was replaced with the United States Grand Prix.
- The FIM Grand Prix was added to the calendar as a one-off Grand Prix to replace the South African Grand Prix (which would have been hosted on 3 October).

== Participants ==
=== 500cc participants ===
| Team | Constructor | Motorcycle | No. | Rider | Rounds |
|---|---|---|---|---|---|
| (United States) Marlboro Team Roberts | Yamaha | Yamaha YZR500 | 1 | (United States) Wayne Rainey | 1–12 |
| (United States) Marlboro Team Roberts | Yamaha | Yamaha YZR500 | 7 | (Italy) Luca Cadalora | All |
| (Japan) Rothmans Honda Team | Honda | Honda NSR500 | 2 | (Australia) Mick Doohan | 1–13 |
| (Japan) Rothmans Honda Team | Honda | Honda NSR500 | 4 | (Australia) Daryl Beattie | All |
| (Japan) HRC Rothmans Honda | Honda | Honda NSR500 | 6 | (Japan) Shinichi Ito | All |
| (Italy) Cagiva Team Agostini | Cagiva | Cagiva C593 | 3 | (United States) John Kocinski | 11–14 |
| (Italy) Cagiva Team Agostini | Cagiva | Cagiva C593 | 5 | (United States) Doug Chandler | All |
| (Italy) Cagiva Team Agostini | Cagiva | Cagiva C593 | 12 | (Australia) Mat Mladin | 1–7, 9–14 |
| (Italy) Cagiva Team Agostini | Cagiva | Cagiva C593 | 63 | (Spain) Juan Garriga | 8 |
| (Italy) Cagiva Team Agostini | Cagiva | Cagiva C593 | 68 | (United Kingdom) Carl Fogarty | 10 |
| (Spain) Marlboro Honda Pons | Honda | Honda NSR500 | 8 | (Spain) Àlex Crivillé | All |
| (Japan) Team Lucky Strike Suzuki | Suzuki | Suzuki RGV500 | 9 | (Brazil) Alex Barros | All |
| (Japan) Team Lucky Strike Suzuki | Suzuki | Suzuki RGV500 | 34 | (United States) Kevin Schwantz | All |
| (Japan) Team Lucky Strike Suzuki | Suzuki | Suzuki RGV500 | 46 | (Australia) Peter Goddard | 1 |
| (United Kingdom) Team Valvoline/WCM | ROC-Yamaha | ROC-Yamaha GP1 | 11 | (United Kingdom) Niall Mackenzie | All |
| (France) Team ROC | ROC-Yamaha | ROC-Yamaha GP1 | 13 | (Japan) Toshiyuki Arakaki | 1–3 |
| (France) Team ROC | ROC-Yamaha | ROC-Yamaha GP1 | 23 | (Switzerland) Serge David | All |
| (France) Team ROC | Yamaha | Yamaha YZR500 | 32 | (France) José Kuhn | 11–14 |
| (France) Team ROC | ROC-Yamaha | ROC-Yamaha GP1 | 38 | (Italy) Corrado Catalano | 4–6 |
| (France) Team ROC | ROC-Yamaha | ROC-Yamaha GP1 | 45 | (United Kingdom) Ron Haslam | 10 |
| (Italy) Librenti Corse | Librenti | Librenti 500 | 14 | (Italy) Marco Papa | 1–8, 13 |
| (Italy) Librenti Corse | ROC-Yamaha | ROC-Yamaha GP1 | 14 | (Italy) Marco Papa | 9, 11–12 |
| (Japan) Team Udagawa | ROC-Yamaha | ROC-Yamaha GP1 | 15 | (Japan) Tsutomu Udagawa | 1–9, 11–14 |
| (Germany) Rallye Sport | Harris-Yamaha | Harris-Yamaha SLS500 | 16 | (Germany) Michael Rudroff | All |
| Yamaha Motor France | Yamaha | Yamaha YZR500 | 18 | (France) Bernard Garcia | All |
| Yamaha Motor France | Yamaha | Yamaha YZR500 | 19 | (United States) Freddie Spencer | 1, 11–12 |
| Yamaha Motor France | Yamaha | Yamaha YZR500 | 32 | (France) José Kuhn | 5–10 |
| Yamaha Motor France | Yamaha | Yamaha YZR500 | 39 | (Japan) Toshihiko Honma | 3 |
| Yamaha Motor France | Yamaha | Yamaha YZR500 | 40 | (France) Jehan d’Orgeix | 4 |
| Yamaha Motor France | Yamaha | Yamaha YZR500 | 51 | (France) Jean-Marc Delétang | 14 |
| (United Kingdom) Team Millar | Yamaha | Yamaha YZR500 | 20 | (United Kingdom) Jeremy McWilliams | All |
| (Belgium) Euro Team | ROC-Yamaha | ROC-Yamaha GP1 | 21 | (Belgium) Laurent Naveau | 1–13 |
| (Belgium) Euro Team | ROC-Yamaha | ROC-Yamaha GP1 | 69 | (United Kingdom) James Haydon | 14 |
| (United Kingdom) M.B.M. Racing Team | Harris-Yamaha | Harris-Yamaha SLS500 | 22 | (United Kingdom) Kevin Mitchell | All |
| (Netherlands) Team Doorakkers Racing | Harris-Yamaha | Harris-Yamaha SLS500 | 24 | (Netherlands) Cees Doorakkers | All |
| (France) Team Ville de Paris | ROC-Yamaha | ROC-Yamaha GP1 | 25 | (France) Thierry Criné | All |
| (Italy) Team Elit | ROC-Yamaha | ROC-Yamaha GP1 | 27 | (Italy) Renzo Colleoni | All |
| (United Kingdom) Padgett's Motorcycles | Harris-Yamaha | Harris-Yamaha SLS500 | 28 | (United Kingdom) John Reynolds | 1–7, 9–14 |
| (United Kingdom) Shell Team Harris; Team Harris | Harris-Yamaha | Harris-Yamaha SLS500 | 29 | (United Kingdom) Sean Emmett | All |
| (United Kingdom) Shell Team Harris; Team Harris | Harris-Yamaha | Harris-Yamaha SLS500 | 41 | (United Kingdom) Darren Dixon | 6 |
| (United Kingdom) Shell Team Harris; Team Harris | Harris-Yamaha | Harris-Yamaha SLS500 | 42 | (New Zealand) Andrew Stroud | 7–14 |
| (United Kingdom) Shell Team Harris; Team Harris | Harris-Yamaha | Harris-Yamaha SLS500 | 44 | (United States) Alan Scott | 1–5 |
| (Spain) López Mella Racing Team | ROC-Yamaha | ROC-Yamaha GP1 | 30 | (Spain) Juan López Mella | All |
| (France) M.T.D. Objectif 500 | ROC-Yamaha | ROC-Yamaha GP1 | 31 | (France) Bruno Bonhuil | All |
| (France) Euromoto | ROC-Yamaha | ROC-Yamaha GP1 | 32 | (France) José Kuhn | 1–4 |
| (Austria) ARC-Austrian Racing Company | ROC-Yamaha | ROC-Yamaha GP1 | 33 | (Austria) Andreas Meklau | All |
| (Switzerland) Argus Racing Team | ROC-Yamaha | ROC-Yamaha GP1 | 35 | (Switzerland) Jean-Luc Romanens | 1–7 |
| (Switzerland) Argus Racing Team | ROC-Yamaha | ROC-Yamaha GP1 | 59 | (Switzerland) Niggi Schmassmann | 6 |
| (Italy) Team Pedercini | ROC-Yamaha | ROC-Yamaha GP1 | 36 | (Italy) Lucio Pedercini | 1–6, 8–14 |
| (United Kingdom) Peter Graves Racing Team | Harris-Yamaha | Harris-Yamaha SLS500 | 37 | (New Zealand) Simon Crafar | 4–8 |
| (United Kingdom) Peter Graves Racing Team | Harris-Yamaha | Harris-Yamaha SLS500 | 43 | (United Kingdom) David Jefferies | 9–14 |
| (Japan) Kirin Mets RT Yamaha | Yamaha | Yamaha YZR500 | 50 | (Japan) Norihiko Fujiwara | 3 |
| (United Kingdom) Team Great Britain | ROC-Yamaha | ROC-Yamaha GP1 | 69 | (United Kingdom) James Haydon | 10 |
| (Italy) Se.Te.Ces.Co | ROC-Yamaha | ROC-Yamaha GP1 | 72 | (Italy) Aldeo Presciutti | 12 |
| (Italy) Gibi Team | ROC-Yamaha | ROC-Yamaha GP1 | 73 | (Italy) Romolo Balbi | 12 |
| (United States) Southwest Motorsports | Harris-Yamaha | Harris-Yamaha SLS500 | 74 | (United States) Danny Walker | 13 |
| (Italy) Team G.O.J. Motor | Harris-Yamaha | Harris-Yamaha SLS500 | 76 | (Italy) Dario Marchetti | 14 |
| (Japan) Nihontelecom RT Yamaha | Yamaha | Yamaha YZR500 | 88 | (Australia) Kevin Magee | 3 |

Key
Regular Rider
Wildcard Rider
Replacement Rider

=== 250cc participants ===
| Team | Constructor | Motorcycle | No. | Rider | Rounds |
|---|---|---|---|---|---|
| (Japan) Telkor Yamaha Valesi Racing | Yamaha | Yamaha TZ 250 M | 3 | (Italy) Pierfrancesco Chili | All |
| (Japan) Telkor Yamaha Valesi Racing | Yamaha | Yamaha TZ 250 M | 31 | (Japan) Tetsuya Harada | All |
| HB Honda Germany | Honda | Honda NSR250 | 4 | (Germany) Helmut Bradl | All |
| HB Honda Germany | Honda | Honda NSR250 | 32 | (Germany) Volker Bähr | All |
| (Japan) Rothmans Kanemoto Honda | Honda | Honda NSR250 | 5 | (Italy) Max Biaggi | All |
| (Spain) Ducados Honda Pons | Honda | Honda NSR250 | 6 | (Spain) Alberto Puig | All |
| (Japan) JTR Mitsui Yamaha Racing | Yamaha | Yamaha TZ 250 M | 7 | (Germany) Jochen Schmid | All |
| (Spain) Team Carlos Cardús Honda | Honda | Honda NSR250 | 8 | (Spain) Carlos Cardús | 1–3, 6–8 |
| (Spain) Team Carlos Cardús Honda | Honda | Honda NSR250 | 36 | (Spain) Pere Riba Cabana | 8 |
| HB Racing Team Italy | Honda | Honda NSR250 | 10 | (Italy) Doriano Romboni | 1–7, 11–14 |
| (Netherlands) Exact Software DC Sports | Aprilia | Aprilia RSV 250 | 11 | (Netherlands) Wilco Zeelenberg | All |
| (Netherlands) Exact Software DC Sports | Aprilia | Aprilia RSV 250 | 24 | (Netherlands) Patrick van den Goorbergh | All |
| (Italy) Daytona Pit Lane Racing | Honda | Honda RS250R | 12 | (Italy) Gabriele Debbia | 1–6 |
| (Italy) Daytona Pit Lane Racing | Honda | Honda RS250R | 35 | (Netherlands) Loek Bodelier | 7–8 |
| (Italy) Daytona Pit Lane Racing | Honda | Honda RS250R | 38 | (Spain) Carlos Checa | 8–14 |
| (Italy) Aprilia Racing Team; Aprilia Unlimited Jeans; Chesterfield Aprilia Racing Team | Aprilia | Aprilia RSV 250 | 13 | (Italy) Loris Reggiani | All |
| (Italy) Aprilia Racing Team; Aprilia Unlimited Jeans; Chesterfield Aprilia Racing Team | Aprilia | Aprilia RSV 250 | 17 | (France) Jean-Philippe Ruggia | All |
| (Italy) Aprilia Racing Team; Aprilia Unlimited Jeans; Chesterfield Aprilia Racing Team | Aprilia | Aprilia RSV 250 | 67 | (Italy) Marcellino Lucchi | 11 |
| (Japan) Kanemoto Racing; Cup Noodle Kanemoto | Honda | Honda NSR250 | 14 | (Japan) Nobuatsu Aoki | All |
| (Japan) Racing Supply; Lucky Strike Keiyu Suzuki | Suzuki | Suzuki RGV250 | 15 | (Japan) Nobuyuki Wakai | 1–3 |
| (Austria) Team Preining | Aprilia | Aprilia RSV 250 | 16 | (Austria) Andy Preining | All |
| (Japan) HRC Rothmans Honda | Honda | Honda NSR250 | 18 | (Japan) Tadayuki Okada | All |
| (Japan) Team Lucky Strike Suzuki 250 | Suzuki | Suzuki RGV250 | 19 | (United States) John Kocinski | 1–7 |
| (Japan) Team Lucky Strike Suzuki 250 | Suzuki | Suzuki RGV250 | 37 | (New Zealand) Simon Crafar | 8–14 |
| (Japan) Team Lucky Strike Suzuki 250 | Suzuki | Suzuki RGV250 | 67 | (United States) Jim Filice | 13 |
| (Switzerland) Mohag Aprilia | Aprilia | Aprilia RSV 250 | 20 | (Switzerland) Eskil Suter | All |
| (Italy) Gilera Racing Team | Gilera | Gilera GFR 250 | 21 | (Italy) Paolo Casoli | 1–7, 10, 12 |
| (Italy) Gilera Racing Team | Gilera | Gilera GFR 250 | 39 | (Italy) Alessandro Gramigni | 1–10, 12 |
| (Spain) PR2-Ducados Aprilia | Aprilia | Aprilia RSV 250 | 22 | (Spain) Luis Maurel | All |
| (Switzerland) Marlboro Aprilia Suisse | Aprilia | Aprilia RSV 250 | 23 | (Switzerland) Bernard Häenggeli | All |
| (Netherlands) Van den Goorbergh Racing | Aprilia | Aprilia RSV 250 | 25 | (Netherlands) Jurgen van den Goorbergh | 1–12, 14 |
| (Germany) Rallye Sport Racing Team Munich | Aprilia | Aprilia RSV 250 | 26 | (Germany) Bernd Kassner | All |
| (France) FP Racing | Aprilia | Aprilia RSV 250 | 27 | (France) Frédéric Protat | All |
| (France) FP Racing | Aprilia | Aprilia RSV 250 | 51 | (France) Jean-Pierre Jeandat | 1–2, 4–10, 12–14 |
| (Switzerland) Honda Suisse Mühlebach | Honda | Honda RS250R | 28 | (Switzerland) Adrian Bosshard | All |
| (Spain) Team Aspar | Honda | Honda RS250R | 30 | (Spain) Juan Borja | 1–6, 10–14 |
| (Spain) Team Aspar | Honda | Honda RS250R | 36 | (Spain) Pere Riba Cabana | 10–14 |
| (Spain) Team Aspar | Honda | Honda RS250R | 45 | (Spain) Jorge Martínez | 9 |
| (Spain) S.S.P. Competicion | Honda | Honda RS250R | 34 | (Spain) Luis d'Antin | 1–9 |
| (Spain) S.S.P. Competicion | Honda | Honda NSR250 | 34 | (Spain) Luis d'Antin | 10–13 |
| (Italy) P.M. Racing | Honda | Honda RS250R | 43 | (Italy) Massimo Pennacchioli | All |
| (Belgium) Chesterfield Team de Radiguès | Aprilia | Aprilia RSV 250 | 44 | (France) Jean-Michel Bayle | All |
| (Malaysia) Petronas Sprinta Yamaha | Yamaha | Yamaha TZ 250 | 48 | (Malaysia) Shahrun Nizam | 2 |
| (Malaysia) Petronas Sprinta Yamaha | Yamaha | Yamaha TZ 250 | 49 | (Malaysia) Tong Veng Kit | 2 |
| (Japan) Cup Noodle Honda | Honda | Honda NSR250 | 50 | (Japan) Takuma Aoki | 3 |
| (Italy) Marlboro Team Pileri | Honda | Honda NSR250 | 65 | (Italy) Loris Capirossi | All |
| (United States) Team Roberts | Yamaha | Yamaha TZ 250 | 75 | (United States) Kenny Roberts Jr. | 13 |
| (United States) Marlboro Team Roberts | Yamaha | Yamaha TZ 250 | 77 | (Spain) Sete Gibernau | 14 |

Key
Regular Rider
Wildcard Rider
Replacement Rider

=== 125cc participants ===
| Team | Constructor | Motorcycle | No. | Rider | Rounds |
|---|---|---|---|---|---|
| Marlboro Team Pileri | Honda | Honda RS125R | 2 | (Italy) Fausto Gresini | 1–10, 12–14 |
| Marlboro Team Pileri | Honda | Honda RS125R | 7 | (Japan) Noboru Ueda | All |
| Marlboro Aprilia | Aprilia | Aprilia RS125R | 3 | (Germany) Ralf Waldmann | All |
| Marlboro Aprilia | Aprilia | Aprilia RS125R | 15 | (Switzerland) Oliver Petrucciani | All |
| Scot Racing Team | Aprilia | Aprilia RS125R | 4 | (Italy) Bruno Casanova | 3–6, 9–14 |
| Scot Racing Team | Aprilia | Aprilia RS125R | 66 | (Italy) Ivan Cremonini | 9 |
| Team Europa Raudies | Honda | Honda RS125R | 5 | (Germany) Dirk Raudies | All |
| Team Aspar | Honda | Honda RS125R | 6 | (Spain) Jorge Martínez | All |
| F.C.C. Technical Sports | Honda | Honda RS125R | 8 | (Japan) Kazuto Sakata | All |
| F.C.C. Technical Sports | Honda | Honda RS125R | 36 | (Japan) Takeshi Tsujimura | All |
| Ducados Aprilia | Aprilia | Aprilia RS125R | 9 | (Spain) Carlos Giro Jr. | All |
| Exact Software DC Sports | Moto Rumi | Rumi 125 GP | 10 | (Netherlands) Hans Spaan | 1–6 |
| Exact Software DC Sports | Honda | Honda RS125R | 10 | (Netherlands) Hans Spaan | 7–14 |
| Team Aprilia Deutschland | Aprilia | Aprilia RS125R | 11 | (Germany) Peter Öttl | 3–14 |
| Team Aprilia Deutschland | Aprilia | Aprilia RS125R | 21 | (Germany) Stefan Kurfiss | 1–9, 12–14 |
| Team Aprilia Deutschland | Aprilia | Aprilia RS125R | 37 | (Germany) Manfred Geissler | 1–2, 10–14 |
| Team Semprucci | Aprilia | Aprilia RS125R | 12 | (Spain) Herri Torrontegui | All |
| Team Semprucci | Aprilia | Aprilia RS125R | 30 | (Switzerland) Giovanni Palmieri | All |
| GP Team Ditter Plastic | Honda | Honda RS125R | 14 | (Germany) Oliver Koch | All |
| Daytona Pit Lane Racing | Honda | Honda RS125R | 16 | (Italy) Ezio Gianola | All |
| Daytona Pit Lane Racing | Honda | Honda RS125R | 35 | (Netherlands) Loek Bodelier | 1–4 |
| Daytona Pit Lane Racing | Honda | Honda RS125R | 65 | (Italy) Gabriele Debbia | 5–14 |
| Elf Team Kepla | Honda | Honda RS125R | 17 | (Japan) Akira Saito | 1–13 |
| Elf Team Kepla | Honda | Honda RS125R | 44 | (France) Nicolas Dussauge | 14 |
| Jha Racing | Honda | Honda RS125R | 19 | (Japan) Kinya Wada | All |
| Jha Racing | Honda | Honda RS125R | 52 | (Japan) Hideyuki Nakajyo | 3 |
| Team Baumann | Honda | Honda RS125R | 20 | (Austria) Manfred Baumann | All |
| Gazzaniga Corse | Gazzaniga | Gazzaniga 125 | 22 | (Italy) Lucio Cecchinello | 2–13 |
| Team+Co Promotion | Honda | Honda RS125R | 23 | (Germany) Maik Stief | 1–8 |
| Team+Co Promotion | Honda | Honda RS125R | 33 | (Germany) Stefan Prein | 9–14 |
| Team+Co Promotion | Honda | Honda RS125R | 37 | (Germany) Manfred Geissler | 1–2, 10–14 |
| Moto Bum Honda; Cup Noodle Moto Bum Honda | Honda | Honda RS125R | 24 | (Japan) Haruchika Aoki | All |
| Burnett Racing | Honda | Honda RS125R | 25 | (United Kingdom) Neil Hodgson | All |
| Team IPA Corse Effeuno | Honda | Honda RS125R | 26 | (Italy) Maurizio Vitali | 5–6 |
| Team IPA Corse Effeuno | Honda | Honda RS125R | 28 | (Italy) Luigi Ancona | All |
| Team IPA Corse Effeuno | Honda | Honda RS125R | 38 | (Italy) Emilio Cuppini | 7–9 |
| Team IPA Corse Effeuno | Honda | Honda RS125R | 39 | (Italy) Daniela Tognoli | 9 |
| Team IPA Corse Effeuno | Honda | Honda RS125R | 67 | (Italy) Daniela Tognoli | 11–14 |
| Arie Molenaar Racing | Honda | Honda RS125R | 27 | (Spain) Julián Miralles | All |
| Miralles Racing Team | Honda | Honda RS125R | 29 | (Spain) Julián Miralles | All |
| AGV-Team Germany | Aprilia | Aprilia RS125R | 31 | (Australia) Garry McCoy | 1–3, 6–14 |
| AGV-Team Germany | Aprilia | Aprilia RS125R | 38 | (Italy) Emilio Cuppini | 4 |
| AGV-Team Germany | Aprilia | Aprilia RS125R | 40 | (Italy) Simone Giannecchini | 5 |
| Team Unemoto & Harc-Pro. | Honda | Honda RS125R | 32 | (Japan) Masafumi Ono | 1–4 |
| Team Unemoto & Harc-Pro. | Honda | Honda RS125R | 39 | (Finland) Aki Ajo | 5 |
| Team Unemoto & Harc-Pro. | Honda | Honda RS125R | 42 | (Japan) Sinya Sato | 6–14 |
| Zwafink Racing | Honda | Honda RS125R | 33 | (Germany) Stefan Prein | 1–5 |
| Zwafink Racing | Honda | Honda RS125R | 41 | (Spain) Luis Alvaro | 6–14 |
| Team Rumi 125 GP | Moto Rumi | Rumi 125 GP | 34 | (Italy) Stefano Caracchi | 1–4, 6 |
| Team Hernández | Aprilia/Sandroni | Aprilia RS125R/Sandroni 125 GP | 43 | (Spain) Manuel Hernández | All |
| M.C. Manresa Petrocat | Honda | Honda RS125R | 63 | (Spain) Carlos Checa | 8 |

Key
Regular Rider
Wildcard Rider
Replacement Rider

== Results and standings ==
=== Grands Prix ===
| Round | Date | Race | Location | 125cc winner | 250cc winner | 500cc winner | Report |
|---|---|---|---|---|---|---|---|
| 1 | 28 March | (Australia) Australian motorcycle Grand Prix | Eastern Creek | (Germany) Dirk Raudies | (Japan) Tetsuya Harada | (United States) Kevin Schwantz | Report |
| 2 | 4 April | (Malaysia) Malaysian motorcycle Grand Prix | Shah Alam | (Germany) Dirk Raudies | (Japan) Nobuatsu Aoki | (United States) Wayne Rainey | Report |
| 3 | 18 April | (Japan) Japanese motorcycle Grand Prix | Suzuka | (Germany) Dirk Raudies | (Japan) Tetsuya Harada | (United States) Wayne Rainey | Report |
| 4 | 2 May | (Spain) Spanish motorcycle Grand Prix | Jerez | (Japan) Kazuto Sakata | (Japan) Tetsuya Harada | (United States) Kevin Schwantz | Report |
| 5 | 16 May | (Austria) Austrian motorcycle Grand Prix | Salzburgring | (Japan) Takeshi Tsujimura | (Italy) Doriano Romboni | (United States) Kevin Schwantz | Report |
| 6 | 13 June | (Germany) German motorcycle Grand Prix | Hockenheim | (Germany) Dirk Raudies | (Italy) Doriano Romboni | (Australia) Daryl Beattie | Report |
| 7 | 26 June | (Netherlands) Dutch TT | Assen | (Germany) Dirk Raudies | (Italy) Loris Capirossi | (United States) Kevin Schwantz | Report |
| 8 | 4 July | (Europe) European motorcycle Grand Prix | Catalunya | (Japan) Noboru Ueda | (Italy) Max Biaggi | (United States) Wayne Rainey | Report |
| 9 | 18 July | San Marino motorcycle Grand Prix | Mugello | (Germany) Dirk Raudies | (Italy) Loris Capirossi | (Australia) Mick Doohan | Report |
| 10 | 1 August | (United Kingdom) British motorcycle Grand Prix | Donington | (Germany) Dirk Raudies | (France) Jean-Philippe Ruggia | (Italy) Luca Cadalora | Report |
| 11 | 22 August | Czech Republic motorcycle Grand Prix | Brno | (Japan) Kazuto Sakata | (Italy) Loris Reggiani | (United States) Wayne Rainey | Report |
| 12 | 5 September | (Italy) Italian motorcycle Grand Prix | Misano | (Germany) Dirk Raudies | (France) Jean-Philippe Ruggia | (Italy) Luca Cadalora | Report |
| 13 | 12 September | United States motorcycle Grand Prix | Laguna Seca | (Germany) Dirk Raudies | (Italy) Loris Capirossi | (United States) John Kocinski | Report |
| 14 | 26 September | FIM motorcycle Grand Prix | Jarama | (Germany) Ralf Waldmann | (Japan) Tetsuya Harada | (Brazil) Alex Barros | Report |

=== 500cc riders' standings ===
Scoring system

Points are awarded to the top fifteen finishers. A rider has to finish the race to earn points.

| Position | **1st** | **2nd** | **3rd** | **4th** | **5th** | **6th** | **7th** | **8th** | **9th** | **10th** | **11th** | **12th** | **13th** | **14th** | **15th** |
| Points | 25 | 20 | 16 | 13 | 11 | 10 | 9 | 8 | 7 | 6 | 5 | 4 | 3 | 2 | 1 |

| Pos | Rider | Bike | AUS (Australia) | MAL (Malaysia) | JPN (Japan) | ESP (Spain) | AUT (Austria) | GER (Germany) | NED (Netherlands) | EUR (Europe) | RSM (San Marino) | GBR (United Kingdom) | CZE (Czech Republic) | ITA (Italy) | USA (United States) | FIM | Pts |
|---|---|---|---|---|---|---|---|---|---|---|---|---|---|---|---|---|---|
| 1 | (United States) Kevin Schwantz | Suzuki | **1** | **3** | **2** | **1** | **1** | 2 | 1 | 3 | 2 | **Ret** | 5 | 3 | 4 | 3 | 248 |
| 2 | (United States) Wayne Rainey | Yamaha | 2 | 1 | 1 | 2 | 3 | 5 | 5 | 1 | 3 | 2 | **1** | Ret | | | 214 |
| 3 | (Australia) Daryl Beattie | Honda | 4 | 2 | 3 | 6 | 7 | 1 | Ret | 4 | 6 | 6 | 6 | 7 | 5 | 2 | 176 |
| 4 | (Australia) Mick Doohan | Honda | Ret | 4 | 7 | 4 | 2 | Ret | **2** | **2** | **1** | Ret | 3 | 2 | **Ret** | | 156 |
| 5 | (Italy) Luca Cadalora | Yamaha | 8 | DNS | Ret | 5 | 5 | 8 | 7 | 15 | 5 | 1 | 2 | **1** | 3 | Ret | 145 |
| 6 | (Brazil) Alex Barros | Suzuki | 5 | 7 | 6 | Ret | 4 | Ret | Ret | 5 | 7 | Ret | 10 | 5 | 2 | 1 | 125 |
| 7 | (Japan) Shinichi Ito | Honda | 7 | 6 | 4 | Ret | 6 | **3** | 6 | Ret | 4 | 5 | 7 | 8 | 6 | Ret | 119 |
| 8 | (Spain) Àlex Crivillé | Honda | 6 | 5 | 5 | 3 | Ret | 4 | 3 | Ret | Ret | Ret | 8 | 6 | 7 | 4 | 117 |
| 9 | (United Kingdom) Niall Mackenzie | Yamaha | 10 | 8 | 13 | 7 | 11 | 9 | 8 | 6 | 8 | 3 | Ret | 9 | 8 | 8 | 103 |
| 10 | (United States) Doug Chandler | Cagiva | 3 | 9 | 11 | Ret | 8 | 6 | 4 | Ret | DNS | DNS | 9 | 10 | Ret | 5 | 83 |
| 11 | (United States) John Kocinski | Cagiva | | | | | | | | | | | 4 | 4 | 1 | **Ret** | 51 |
| 12 | (Spain) Juan López Mella | Yamaha | Ret | 13 | Ret | 8 | 13 | 14 | Ret | 7 | Ret | 7 | 14 | 12 | 10 | Ret | 46 |
| 13 | (Australia) Mat Mladin | Cagiva | 9 | 10 | Ret | Ret | 10 | 7 | Ret | | 9 | DNS | DNS | Ret | Ret | 6 | 45 |
| 14 | (France) Jose Kuhn | Yamaha | 13 | Ret | 19 | 14 | 9 | Ret | 13 | 8 | 10 | 12 | 15 | 16 | 11 | 10 | 45 |
| 15 | (United Kingdom) John Reynolds | Yamaha | Ret | 12 | Ret | Ret | 14 | 17 | 10 | | Ret | 9 | 12 | 11 | 9 | 9 | 42 |
| 16 | (France) Bernard Garcia | Yamaha | 12 | Ret | Ret | DNS | 23 | 10 | 11 | Ret | 11 | 13 | 11 | 13 | Ret | 7 | 40 |
| 17 | (Italy) Renzo Colleoni | Yamaha | 17 | 15 | 22 | 13 | 21 | 19 | 18 | 10 | 12 | 8 | 17 | 20 | Ret | Ret | 22 |
| 18 | (Belgium) Laurent Naveau | Yamaha | 11 | 11 | 16 | Ret | 12 | 12 | 15 | Ret | Ret | 15 | Ret | 21 | 15 | | 21 |
| 19 | (United Kingdom) Sean Emmett | Yamaha | 16 | 14 | 15 | 9 | 16 | Ret | 16 | 12 | Ret | Ret | Ret | Ret | 13 | 14 | 19 |
| 20 | (Japan) Tsutomu Udagawa | Yamaha | 14 | Ret | 14 | 10 | 15 | 11 | 14 | Ret | Ret | | | 23 | 17 | Ret | 18 |
| 21 | (Germany) Michael Rudroff | Yamaha | Ret | 17 | Ret | Ret | 17 | 13 | 12 | 17 | Ret | 10 | 13 | 15 | 18 | Ret | 17 |
| 22 | (United Kingdom) Jeremy McWilliams | Yamaha | Ret | DNS | Ret | Ret | 20 | Ret | Ret | 11 | 13 | Ret | 16 | 19 | 12 | 11 | 17 |
| 23 | (United Kingdom) Carl Fogarty | Cagiva | | | | | | | | | | 4 | | | | | 13 |
| 24 | (Japan) Toshihiko Honma | Yamaha | | | 8 | | | | | | | | | | | | 8 |
| 25 | (Spain) Juan Garriga | Cagiva | | | | | | | | 9 | | | | | | | 7 |
| 26 | (Australia) Kevin Magee | Yamaha | | | 9 | | | | | | | | | | | | 7 |
| 27 | (New Zealand) Simon Crafar | Yamaha | | | | Ret | 18 | Ret | 9 | Ret | | | | | | | 7 |
| 28 | (Japan) Norihiko Fujiwara | Yamaha | | | 10 | | | | | | | | | | | | 6 |
| 29 | (Italy) Lucio Pedercini | Yamaha | 18 | 16 | Ret | 12 | Ret | | | Ret | 15 | Ret | 20 | 17 | Ret | 15 | 6 |
| 30 | (Switzerland) Serge David | Yamaha | 15 | 18 | Ret | 15 | Ret | 16 | Ret | Ret | 14 | Ret | Ret | Ret | 14 | Ret | 6 |
| 31 | (Italy) Corrado Catalano | Yamaha | | | | 11 | Ret | Ret | | | | | | | | | 5 |
| 32 | (United Kingdom) James Haydon | Yamaha | | | | | | | | | | 11 | | | | Ret | 5 |
| 33 | (Japan) Toshiyuki Arakaki | Yamaha | 23 | 23 | 12 | | | | | | | | | | | | 4 |
| 34 | (New Zealand) Andrew Stroud | Yamaha | | | | | | | 20 | 16 | 16 | Ret | Ret | 18 | Ret | 12 | 4 |
| 35 | (United Kingdom) Kevin Mitchell | Yamaha | Ret | 24 | 18 | 17 | Ret | Ret | 19 | Ret | Ret | Ret | Ret | Ret | Ret | 13 | 3 |
| 36 | (Austria) Andreas Meklau | Yamaha | 19 | 21 | 24 | 18 | 24 | 18 | 17 | 13 | Ret | 17 | 18 | 24 | 19 | Ret | 3 |
| 37 | (United States) Freddie Spencer | Yamaha | Ret | | | | | | | | | | Ret | 14 | | | 2 |
| 38 | (Netherlands) Cees Doorakkers | Yamaha | 21 | 19 | 23 | 16 | Ret | 20 | 21 | 14 | Ret | 19 | Ret | Ret | Ret | 21 | 2 |
| 39 | (United Kingdom) Ron Haslam | Yamaha | | | | | | | | | | 14 | | | | | 2 |
| 40 | (France) Bruno Bonhuil | Yamaha | Ret | 22 | 20 | 20 | 22 | 15 | Ret | Ret | Ret | 18 | 22 | 25 | 20 | 17 | 1 |
| Pos | Rider | Bike | AUS (Australia) | MAL (Malaysia) | JPN (Japan) | ESP (Spain) | AUT (Austria) | GER (Germany) | NED (Netherlands) | EUR (Europe) | RSM (San Marino) | GBR (United Kingdom) | CZE (Czech Republic) | ITA (Italy) | USA (United States) | FIM | Pts |

| Colour | Result |
|---|---|
| Gold | Winner |
| Silver | Second place |
| Bronze | Third place |
| Green | Points classification |
| Blue | Non-points classification |
| Blue | Non-classified finish (NC) |
| Purple | Retired, not classified (Ret) |
| Red | Did not qualify (DNQ) |
| Red | Did not pre-qualify (DNPQ) |
| Black | Disqualified (DSQ) |
| White | Did not start (DNS) |
| White | Withdrew (WD) |
| White | Race cancelled (C) |
| Blank | Did not practice (DNP) |
| Blank | Did not arrive (DNA) |
| Blank | Excluded (EX) |

**Bold** – Pole

=== 250cc riders' standings ===
Scoring system

Points are awarded to the top fifteen finishers. A rider has to finish the race to earn points.

| Position | **1st** | **2nd** | **3rd** | **4th** | **5th** | **6th** | **7th** | **8th** | **9th** | **10th** | **11th** | **12th** | **13th** | **14th** | **15th** |
| Points | 25 | 20 | 16 | 13 | 11 | 10 | 9 | 8 | 7 | 6 | 5 | 4 | 3 | 2 | 1 |

| Pos | Rider | No | Bike | AUS (Australia) | MAL (Malaysia) | JPN (Japan) | ESP (Spain) | AUT (Austria) | GER (Germany) | NED (Netherlands) | EUR (Europe) | SMR (San Marino) | GBR (United Kingdom) | CZE (Czech Republic) | ITA (Italy) | USA (United States) | FIM | Pts |
|---|---|---|---|---|---|---|---|---|---|---|---|---|---|---|---|---|---|---|
| 1 | (Japan) Tetsuya Harada | 31 | Yamaha | 1 | 2 | **1** | **1** | 6 | 6 | 2 | Ret | 3 | Ret | 6 | Ret | 5 | 1 | 197 |
| 2 | (Italy) Loris Capirossi | 65 | Honda | **Ret** | **12** | 10 | 10 | 2 | 2 | **1** | Ret | 1 | **2** | **5** | 2 | **1** | **5** | 193 |
| 3 | (Italy) Loris Reggiani | 13 | Aprilia | 14 | 7 | Ret | Ret | 4 | 5 | 6 | Ret | **2** | 3 | 1 | 3 | 3 | 2 | 158 |
| 4 | (Italy) Max Biaggi | 5 | Honda | 3 | 17 | Ret | 2 | 5 | 4 | Ret | **1** | 5 | 6 | 2 | **Ret** | Ret | 3 | 142 |
| 5 | (Italy) Doriano Romboni | 10 | Honda | 7 | 4 | 3 | 8 | **1** | **1** | Ret | | | | 4 | Ret | 2 | 6 | 139 |
| 6 | (France) Jean-Philippe Ruggia | 17 | Aprilia | 9 | 19 | 5 | 3 | Ret | 8 | 4 | 5 | 4 | 1 | Ret | 1 | Ret | Ret | 129 |
| 7 | (Germany) Helmut Bradl | 4 | Honda | 8 | 6 | 6 | 5 | 3 | 3 | 5 | 11 | 7 | Ret | 7 | 4 | 8 | Ret | 126 |
| 8 | (Japan) Tadayuki Okada | 18 | Honda | 4 | 3 | 2 | 7 | Ret | | Ret | 2 | 6 | 5 | 11 | 7 | 9 | Ret | 120 |
| 9 | (Spain) Alberto Puig | 6 | Honda | 13 | 8 | 15 | Ret | 9 | 11 | 9 | 3 | 10 | Ret | 3 | 5 | 4 | 4 | 106 |
| 10 | (Italy) Pierfrancesco Chili | 3 | Yamaha | 10 | 9 | 7 | 12 | 8 | 7 | 8 | Ret | 8 | 4 | 8 | 8 | 6 | 8 | 106 |
| 11 | (Japan) Nobuatsu Aoki | 14 | Honda | 5 | 1 | 4 | Ret | Ret | DNS | 10 | 4 | 9 | Ret | 10 | 6 | 7 | Ret | 100 |
| 12 | (United States) John Kocinski | 19 | Suzuki | 2 | 5 | 9 | 4 | 7 | 12 | 3 | | | | | | | | 80 |
| 13 | (Netherlands) Wilco Zeelenberg | 11 | Aprilia | 11 | Ret | 16 | 6 | Ret | Ret | 7 | 8 | Ret | 11 | 12 | 9 | Ret | 14 | 50 |
| 14 | (West Germany) Jochen Schmid | 7 | Yamaha | 12 | Ret | 14 | 9 | 14 | 13 | Ret | 12 | 15 | 7 | 9 | 10 | Ret | 11 | 50 |
| 15 | (Spain) Luis D'Antin | 34 | Honda | Ret | 10 | 13 | 11 | 12 | 10 | 11 | 7 | | Ret | Ret | Ret | 11 | | 43 |
| 16 | (Netherlands) Patrick van den Goorbergh | 24 | Aprilia | Ret | 13 | 12 | Ret | 15 | Ret | Ret | 13 | 17 | 9 | 14 | 14 | 16 | 7 | 31 |
| 17 | (Austria) Andy Preining | 16 | Aprilia | Ret | 14 | 11 | 15 | 10 | Ret | 13 | 9 | 23 | Ret | Ret | 13 | Ret | 13 | 30 |
| 18 | (Spain) Carlos Cardús | 8 | Honda | 6 | 18 | Ret | DNS | | 9 | Ret | 6 | | | | | | | 27 |
| 19 | (Switzerland) Eskil Suter | 20 | Aprilia | Ret | 15 | 17 | 18 | 11 | Ret | 14 | Ret | 12 | 10 | Ret | Ret | Ret | 10 | 24 |
| 20 | (Switzerland) Adrian Bosshard | 28 | Honda | 15 | 11 | Ret | 13 | 13 | 21 | 12 | Ret | 19 | 14 | 17 | 15 | 15 | 15 | 21 |
| 21 | (New Zealand) Simon Crafar | 37 | Suzuki | | | | | | | | 10 | 13 | Ret | 13 | 11 | Ret | Ret | 17 |
| 22 | (France) Jean-Michel Bayle | 44 | Aprilia | 19 | 16 | 21 | 14 | 17 | 14 | 16 | 18 | 18 | 8 | Ret | 19 | Ret | 12 | 16 |
| 23 | (Spain) Carlos Checa | 38 | Honda | | | | | | | | | 21 | 25 | Ret | 20 | 14 | 9 | 9 |
| 24 | (Japan) Takuma Aoki | 50 | Honda | | | 8 | | | | | | | | | | | | 8 |
| 25 | (France) Frédéric Protat | 27 | Aprilia | Ret | Ret | 20 | 16 | Ret | 16 | Ret | Ret | 16 | 12 | 15 | Ret | 13 | 19 | 8 |
| 26 | (Italy) Paolo Casoli | 21 | Gilera | 16 | Ret | Ret | Ret | Ret | 19 | Ret | | | 13 | | 12 | | | 7 |
| 27 | (United States) Kenny Roberts Jr. | 75 | Yamaha | | | | | | | | | | | | | 10 | | 6 |
| 28 | (Italy) Marcellino Lucchi | 67 | Aprilia | | | | | | | | | 11 | | | | | | 5 |
| 29 | (Spain) Juan Borja | 30 | Honda | Ret | Ret | 23 | 17 | Ret | 15 | Ret | | | 18 | Ret | Ret | 12 | Ret | 5 |
| 30 | (Italy) Alessandro Gramigni | 39 | Gilera | Ret | Ret | 18 | Ret | 18 | 24 | Ret | Ret | 14 | 16 | | Ret | | | 2 |
| 31 | (Germany) Bernd Kassner | 26 | Aprilia | 20 | 22 | 22 | Ret | Ret | 18 | 17 | 14 | 20 | 17 | Ret | 21 | 20 | 18 | 2 |
| 32 | (Netherlands) Jurgen van den Goorbergh | 25 | Aprilia | 17 | 20 | 19 | 23 | 20 | Ret | 15 | Ret | Ret | 22 | 18 | Ret | | Ret | 1 |
| 33 | (France) Jean-Pierre Jeandat | 51 | Aprilia | 18 | Ret | Ret | DNS | 19 | Ret | Ret | 15 | Ret | 20 | | Ret | 21 | 22 | 1 |
| 34 | (Switzerland) Bernard Haenggeli | 23 | Aprilia | Ret | 23 | 24 | 19 | Ret | 23 | 18 | 16 | Ret | 15 | 19 | 16 | 18 | Ret | 1 |
| | (Spain) Luis Maurel | 22 | Aprilia | Ret | 21 | Ret | 21 | 16 | Ret | Ret | 21 | Ret | 23 | 16 | Ret | 19 | 16 | 0 |
| | (Germany) Adi Stadler | | Honda | | | | | | 17 | | | | | | | | | 0 |
| | (Spain) Pere Riba | 36 | Honda | | | | | | | | 17 | | Ret | 20 | 17 | 17 | Ret | 0 |
| | (Spain) Miguel Castilla | 54 | Yamaha | | | | DNQ | | | | | | | | | | 17 | 0 |
| | (Italy) Giuseppe Fiorillo | | Aprilia | | | | | | | | | | | | 18 | | | 0 |
| | (Germany) Volker Bahr | 32 | Honda | Ret | 25 | 26 | 22 | Ret | Ret | 19 | 19 | 22 | 21 | 21 | 22 | Ret | 20 | 0 |
| | (United Kingdom) Nigel Bosworth | | Yamaha | | | | | | | | | | 19 | | | | | 0 |
| | (Italy) Gabriele Debbia | 12 | Honda | 23 | Ret | 25 | 20 | 22 | 20 | | | | | | | | | 0 |
| | (Italy) Massimo Pennacchioli | 43 | Honda | 24 | 26 | 27 | Ret | 21 | 22 | 20 | 22 | 24 | 24 | 22 | Ret | 22 | 21 | 0 |
| | (Spain) Oscar Sainz | | Yamaha | | | | | | | | 20 | | | | | | | 0 |
| | (Japan) Nobuyuki Wakai | 15 | Suzuki | 21 | Ret | 28 | | | | | | | | | | | | 0 |
| | (Netherlands) Rudie Markink | | Yamaha | | | | | | | 21 | | | | | | | | 0 |
| | (Australia) Rene Bongers | | Honda | 22 | | | | | | | | | | | | | | 0 |
| | (Netherlands) Loek Bodelier | 35 | Honda | | | | | | | Ret | 23 | | | | | | | 0 |
| | (Italy) Davide Bulega | | Aprilia | | | | | | | | | | | | 23 | | | 0 |
| | (Malaysia) Sharun Nizam | | Yamaha | | 24 | | | | | | | | | | | | | 0 |
| | (Spain) Alex Sirera | 53 | Yamaha | | | | 24 | | | | Ret | | | | | | | 0 |
| | (San Marino) Claudio Tonnini | | Honda | | | | | | | | | 25 | | | | | | 0 |
| | (Australia) Stephen Whitehouse | | Yamaha | Ret | | | | | | | | | | | | | | 0 |
| | (Malaysia) Veng Kit Tong | | Yamaha | | Ret | | | | | | | | | | | | | 0 |
| | (Japan) Osamu Miyazaki | | Aprilia | | | Ret | | | | | | | | | | | | 0 |
| | (Austria) Hannes Maxwald | | Aprilia | | | | | Ret | | | | | | | | | | 0 |
| | (Netherlands) Mattieu van Gaalen | | Aprilia | | | | | | | Ret | | | | | | | | 0 |
| | (Spain) Jorge Martínez | | Honda | | | | | | | | | Ret | | | | | | 0 |
| | (United Kingdom) Paul Brown | | Honda | | | | | | | | | | Ret | | | | | 0 |
| | (Czech Republic) Bohumil Stasa Jr. | | Aprilia | | | | | | | | | | | Ret | | | | 0 |
| | (Czech Republic) Marek Moravek | | Yamaha | | | | | | | | | | | Ret | | | | 0 |
| | (Spain) Sete Gibernau | 77 | Yamaha | | | | | | | | | | | | | | Ret | 0 |
| | (Austria) Alexander Witting | | Aprilia | | | | | DNS | | | | | | | | | | 0 |
| Pos | Rider | No | Bike | AUS (Australia) | MAL (Malaysia) | JPN (Japan) | ESP (Spain) | AUT (Austria) | GER (Germany) | NED (Netherlands) | EUR (Europe) | SMR (San Marino) | GBR (United Kingdom) | CZE (Czech Republic) | ITA (Italy) | USA (United States) | FIM | Pts |

=== 125cc riders' standings ===
Scoring system

Points are awarded to the top fifteen finishers. A rider has to finish the race to earn points.

| Position | **1st** | **2nd** | **3rd** | **4th** | **5th** | **6th** | **7th** | **8th** | **9th** | **10th** | **11th** | **12th** | **13th** | **14th** | **15th** |
| Points | 25 | 20 | 16 | 13 | 11 | 10 | 9 | 8 | 7 | 6 | 5 | 4 | 3 | 2 | 1 |

| Pos | Rider | Bike | Nationality | Team | Points | Wins |
|---|---|---|---|---|---|---|
| 1 | (Germany) Dirk Raudies | 5 | Germany | Europa Raudies-Honda | 280 | 9 |
| 2 | (Japan) Kazuto Sakata | 8 | Japan | F.C.C. Technical Sports-Honda | 266 | 2 |
| 3 | (Japan) Takeshi Tsujimura | 36 | Japan | F.C.C. Technical Sports-Honda | 177 | 1 |
| 4 | (Germany) Ralf Waldmann | 3 | Germany | Marlboro-Aprilia | 160 | 1 |
| 5 | (Japan) Noboru Ueda | 7 | Japan | Marlboro-Honda | 129 | 1 |
| 6 | (Japan) Akira Saito | 17 | Japan | Elf Kepla-Honda | 117 | 0 |
| 7 | (Switzerland) Olivier Petrucciani | 15 | Switzerland | Marlboro-Aprilia | 82 | 0 |
| 8 | (Spain) Jorge Martínez | 6 | Spain | Aspar-Honda | 74 | 0 |
| 9 | (Spain) Herri Torrontegui | 12 | Spain | Semprucci-Aprilia | 65 | 0 |
| 10 | (Germany) Peter Öttl | 11 | Germany | Deutschland-Aprilia | 64 | 0 |
| 11 | (Italy) Fausto Gresini | 2 | Italy | Marlboro-Aprilia | 61 | |
| 12 | (Italy) Ezio Gianola | 16 | Italy | Daytona-Pit Lane-Honda | 59 | |
| 13 | (Germany) Oliver Koch | 14 | Germany | Ditter Plastic-Honda | 52 | |
| 14 | (Japan) Haruchika Aoki | 24 | Japan | Moto Bum-Honda | 39 | |
| 15 | (Germany) Stefan Prein | 33 | Germany | Co Promotion-Honda | 38 | |
| 16 | (Austria) Manfred Baumann | 20 | Austria | Baumann-Honda | 36 | |
| 17 | (Japan) Kinya Wada | 19 | Japan | Jha-Honda | 30 | |
| 19 | (Australia) Garry McCoy | 31 | Australia | AGV Germany-Aprilia | 25 | |
| 20 | (Spain) Carlos Giro Jr. | 9 | Spain | Ducados-Aprilia | 22 | |
| 21 | (Italy) Bruno Casanova | 4 | Italy | Scot Racing-Aprilia | 22 | |
| 22 | (Italy) Luigi Ancona | 28 | Italy | IPA Corse Effeuno-Honda | 22 | |
| 23 | (Germany) Maik Stief | 23 | Germany | Co Promotion-Honda | 21 | |
| 24 | (United Kingdom) Neil Hodgson | 25 | Great Britain | Burnett-Honda | 18 | |
| 25 | (Netherlands) Hans Spaan | 10 | Netherlands | Exact Software-DC Sports-Rumi/Honda | 16 | |
| 26 | (Germany) Stefan Kurfiss | 21 | Germany | Aprilia Deutschland | 14 | |
| 27 | (Spain) Carlos Checa | 63 | Spain | M.C Manresa-Petrocat-Honda | 9 | |
| 28 | (Japan) Hideyuki Nakajoh | 52 | Japan | Jha-Honda | 8 | |
| 29 | (Italy) Gabriele Debbia | 65 | Italy | Daytona-Pit Lane-Honda | 7 | |
| 30 | (Germany) Manfred Geissler | 37 | Germany | Co Promotion-Honda | 6 | |
| 31 | (Japan) Ken Miyasaka | | Japan | | 4 | |
| 32 | (Spain) Julián Miralles | 27 | Spain | Miralles-Honda | 4 | |
| 33 | (Italy) Emilio Cuppini | 38 | Italy | IPA Corse Effeuno-Honda | 3 | |
| 33 | (Japan) Sinya Sato | 42 | Japan | Unemoto & Harc-Pro.-Honda | 3 | |
| 35 | (Netherlands) Arie Molenaar | 29 | Netherlands | Arie Molenaar-Honda | 1 | |
