= Doriano Romboni =

Italian motorcycle racer

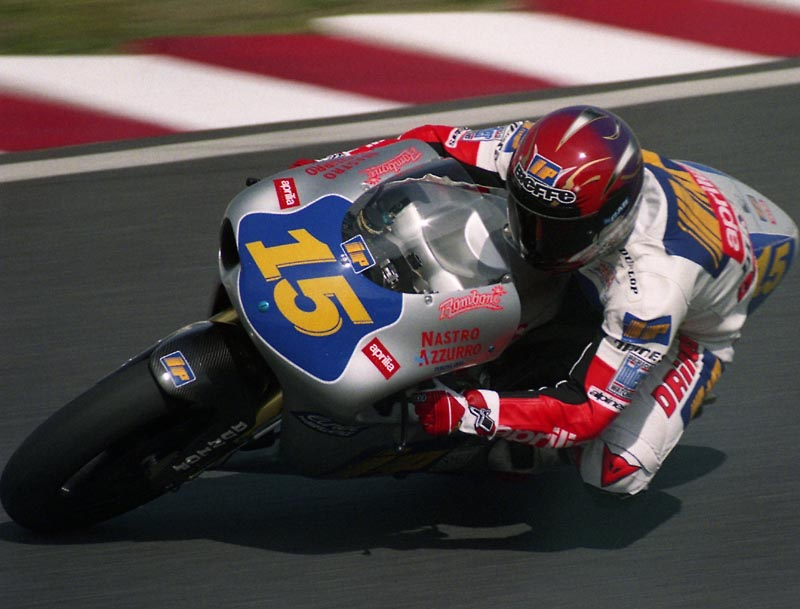
- Romboni at the 1996 Japanese Grand Prix
- Nationality: (Italy) Italian
- Born: 8 December 1968; Lerici, Italy
- Died: 30 November 2013 (aged 44); Latina, Italy
Motorcycle racing career statistics
Grand Prix motorcycle racing
Active years	1989–1998
First race	1989 125cc Spanish Grand Prix
Last race	1998 500cc Japanese Grand Prix
First win	1990 125cc West German Grand Prix
Last win	1995 250cc Brazilian Grand Prix
Team(s)	Honda, Aprilia, MuZ
Starts / Wins / Podiums / Poles / F. laps / Points; 101 / 6 / 22 / 7 / 4 / 724
Superbike World Championship
Active years	1999–2000, 2004
Manufacturers	Ducati, Yamaha
Starts / Wins / Podiums / Poles / F. laps / Points; 12 / 0 / 0 / 0 / 0 / 61

Doriano Romboni (8 December 1968 in Lerici, Italy – 30 November 2013 in Latina, Italy) was an Italian Grand Prix motorcycle road racer.

== Career ==
Romboni raced in 125cc and 250cc World Championship races on Hondas. In 1996, he rode for the Aprilia factory in the 500cc class aboard a bike with a V-twin, 250cc engine that had been enlarged to 380cc. Aprilia tried to take advantage of the bike's lightweight and agility against their more powerful competition. Romboni managed to finish in tenth place in the 1997 season before Aprilia withdrew the project. He raced for the MuZ team in one race in the 1998 season.

In 1999, Rombini switched to the Superbike World Championship on a private Ducati. He was a frontrunner in the early races. At Monza, he briefly ran third behind Carl Fogarty and Troy Corser before he collided with Aaron Slight and hurt his leg. He briefly returned to the series in 2000 then again in 2004.

== Death ==
On 30 November 2013, Romboni died in a crash during the second edition of the Sic Supermoto Day, a race in honor of the memory of fellow Italian Marco Simoncelli, who also died in a crash in 2011.

== Career statistics ==
=== Grand Prix motorcycle racing ===
==== Races by year ====
(key) (Races in bold indicate pole position) (Races in italics indicate fastest lap)

Year	Class	Bike	1	2	3	4	5	6	7	8	9	10	11	12	13	14	15	Pos.	Pts
1989	125cc	Honda	JPN	AUS	SPA; Ret	NAT; 10	GER; 15	AUT; Ret	NED; 17	BEL; 12	FRA; Ret	GBR; 7	SWE; Ret	CZE; Ret				20th	20
1990	125cc	Honda	JPN	SPA; Ret	NAT; Ret	**GER**; 1	AUT; 6	YUG; 5	NED; 1	BEL; 11	**FRA**; 2	GBR; 2	SWE; 3	**CZE**; Ret	HUN; Ret	AUS; 3		4th	130
1991	250cc	Honda	JPN; Ret	AUS; Ret	USA; 13	SPA; 9	ITA; Ret	GER; 13	AUT; Ret	EUR; 7	NED; DNS	FRA	GBR	RSM; 6	CZE; Ret	VDM; Ret	MAL; Ret	15th	32
1992	250cc	Honda	JPN; Ret	AUS; 6	MAL; 6	SPA; 12	ITA; 10	EUR; 7	GER; Ret	NED; Ret	HUN; 7	FRA; Ret	GBR; 3	BRA; 4	RSA; Ret			10th	43
1993	250cc	Honda	AUS; 7	MAL; 4	JPN; 3	SPA; 8	**AUT**; 1	**GER**; 1	NED; Ret	EUR	RSM	GBR	CZE; 4	ITA; Ret	USA; 2	FIM; 6		5th	139
1994	250cc	Honda	AUS; 2	MAL; 5	JPN; 6	SPA; 2	AUT; 3	GER; 3	NED; Ret	ITA; Ret	**FRA**; 2	GBR; 3	CZE; Ret	**USA**; 1	ARG	EUR; 3		4th	170
1995	250cc	Honda	AUS; 6	MAL; Ret	JPN; Ret	SPA; 4	GER; DNS	ITA	NED	FRA; Ret	GBR; DNS	CZE; 5	BRA; 1	ARG; 3	EUR			9th	75
1996	500cc	Aprilia	MAL; DNS	INA; 11	JPN; 7	SPA; Ret	ITA; 9	FRA; Ret	NED; Ret	GER; Ret	GBR	AUT	CZE	IMO; 14	CAT; DNS	BRA	AUS	19th	23
1997	500cc	Aprilia	MAL	JPN	SPA; 6	ITA; 11	AUT; 10	FRA; 11	NED; 3	IMO; Ret	GER; 5	BRA; 7	GBR; 7	CZE; Ret	CAT; 10	INA; 10	AUS; 11	10th	88
1998	500cc	MuZ Weber	JPN; 12	MAL; DNS	SPA	ITA	FRA	MAD	NED	GBR	GER	CZE	IMO	CAT	AUS	ARG		28th	4

=== Superbike World Championship ===
==== Races by year ====
(key) (Races in bold indicate pole position) (Races in italics indicate fastest lap)

Year	Make	1		2		3		4		5		6		7		8		9		10		11		12		13		Pos.	Pts
Year	Make	R1	R2	R1	R2	R1	R2	R1	R2	R1	R2	R1	R2	R1	R2	R1	R2	R1	R2	R1	R2	R1	R2	R1	R2	R1	R2	Pos.	Pts
1999	Ducati	RSA; 9	RSA; 9	AUS; 7	AUS; 8	GBR; 11	GBR; 8	SPA; DNS	SPA; DNS	ITA; Ret	ITA; DNS	GER	GER	SMR	SMR	USA	USA	EUR	EUR	AUT	AUT	NED	NED	GER	GER	JPN	JPN	17th	44
2000	Ducati	RSA	RSA	AUS	AUS	JPN	JPN	GBR	GBR	ITA	ITA	GER	GER	SMR	SMR	SPA	SPA	USA	USA	EUR	EUR	NED; 7	NED; 11	GER; Ret	GER; DNS	GBR	GBR	35th	14
2004	Yamaha	SPA	SPA	AUS	AUS	SMR; DNS	SMR; DNS	ITA	ITA	GER	GER	GBR	GBR	USA	USA	EUR	EUR	NED	NED	ITA; 15	ITA; 14	FRA	FRA					35th	3
