= Kazuto Sakata =

Japanese motorcycle racer (born 1966)

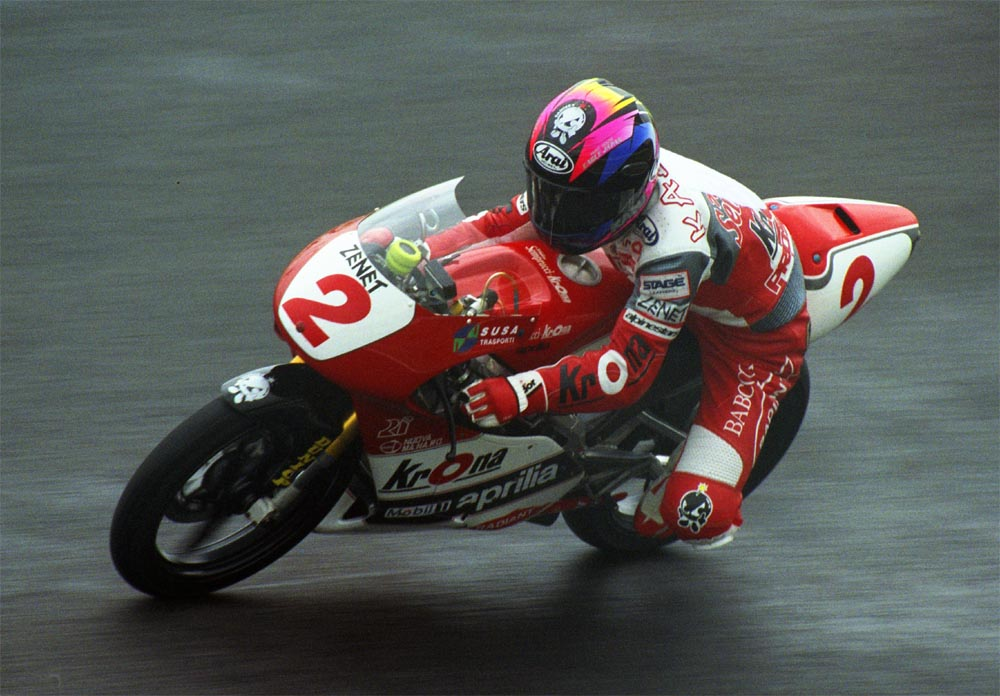
- Kazuto Sakata at the 1994 Japanese GP
- Nationality: Japanese
Motorcycle racing career statistics
Grand Prix motorcycle racing
Active years	1991 - 1999
First race	1991 125cc Japanese Grand Prix
Last race	1999 125cc Argentine Grand Prix
First win	1993 125cc Spanish Grand Prix
Last win	1998 125cc British Grand Prix
Team(s)	Honda, Aprilia
Championships	125cc - 1994, 1998
Starts / Wins / Podiums / Poles / F. laps / Points; 126 / 11 / 41 / 29 / 19 / 687

Kazuto Sakata (坂田 和人; born August 15, 1966 in Kōtō, Tokyo) is a Japanese former professional motorcycle racer. He competed in Grand Prix motorcycle racing from 1991 to 1999. Sakata is notable being a two-time F.I.M. 125cc world champion.

== Motorcycle racing career ==
Sakata began his Grand Prix career in 1991 and by the 1993 season, finished second to Dirk Raudies in the 125cc class on a Honda. In 1994, he became the first Japanese rider to race for a European factory when he signed with the Aprilia factory. He repaid them by winning the 125cc championship that year. He repeated as champion in 1998 after a tight points battle with Tomomi Manako and Marco Melandri. He retired after the 1999 season.

After retirement, Sakata has become a motorcycle coach and trainer, for the next generation of racers. He is the principal of the MFJ Road Race Academy. In 2018, Sakata participated in the All Japan Road Race Championship at Tsukuba Circuit in the J-GP3 class. It was his first return to the All Japan Championship in 13 years. His participation in the race was at the behest of his students.

== Motorcycle Grand Prix results ==
(key) (Races in bold indicate pole position)

Year	Class	Team	Machine	1	2	3	4	5	6	7	8	9	10	11	12	13	14	15	16	Pos	Pts	Wins
1991	125cc	ELF Kepla-Meiko Honda	RS125	JPN; Ret	AUS; 16	USA	ESP; DNS	ITA; Ret	GER; 10	AUT; Ret	EUR; 14	NED; 11	FRA; 7	GBR; 8	RSM; 8	CZE; Ret	VDM	**MAL**; 2		13th	55	0
1992	125cc	F.C.C./T.S. Venus-Honda	RS125	JPN; Ret	**AUS**; Ret	MAL; 6	**ESP**; 4	ITA; Ret	EUR	GER; Ret	NED; 6	HUN; 7	FRA; 4	GBR; 6	**BRA**; 14	RSA; Ret				11th	42	0
1993	125cc	F.C.C. Technical Sports-Honda	RS125	AUS; 2	MAL; 2	JPN; 2	ESP; 1	**AUT**; 2	GER; 2	NED; 2	EUR; Ret	**RSM**; 2	**GBR**; 2	**CZE**; 1	**ITA**; 2	**USA**; 2	FIM; 3			**2nd**	**266**	**2**
1994	125cc	Semprucci-Aprilia	RS125R	**AUS**; 1	**MAL**; 2	JPN; 2	**ESP**; 1	AUT; 5	GER; 2	NED; 4	ITA; 2	**FRA**; 3	**GBR**; 4	**CZE**; 1	**USA**; Ret	ARG; 9	EUR; 7			**1st**	**224**	**3**
1995	125cc	Team Krona-Aprilia	RS125R	AUS; 2	MAL; 10	**JPN**; 3	**ESP**; 6	**GER**; Ret	**ITA**; 5	NED; 4	FRA; 12	GBR; 1	**CZE**; 1	BRA; Ret	ARG; Ret	EUR; 4				**2nd**	**140**	**2**
1996	125cc	Aprilia	RS125R	**MAL**; 10	INA; 14	JPN; Ret	ESP; 5	ITA; 3	FRA; 8	NED; 7	GER; 11	GBR; 5	AUT; 9	CZE; 4	IMO; 12	CAT; 3	BRA; 11	AUS; Ret		8th	113	0
1997	125cc	Aprilia	RS125R	MAL; 2	JPN; 2	ESP; 7	ITA; 6	AUT; 6	FRA; Ret	NED; 3	IMO; 3	GER; Ret	BRA; 5	GBR; Ret	CZE; 9	**CAT**; 2	INA; 2	**AUS**; 2		4th	179	0
1998	125cc	Aprilia	RS125R	JPN; 1	MAL; 6	ESP; 1	ITA; 4	FRA; 1	**MAD**; 4	**NED**; 2	**GBR**; 1	GER; 7	**CZE**; 2	IMO; 4	CAT; 9	AUS; 4	ARG; 5			**1st**	**229**	**4**
1999	125cc	Honda	RS125	MAL; 10	JPN; 8	ESP; 13	FRA; 9	ITA; 8	CAT; 7	NED; 10	GBR; 13	GER; 19	CZE; Ret	IMO; Ret	VAL; 12	AUS; 13	RSA; 15	BRA; 17	ARG; Ret	14th	56	0
