= Jean-Michel Bayle =

French motorcycle racer

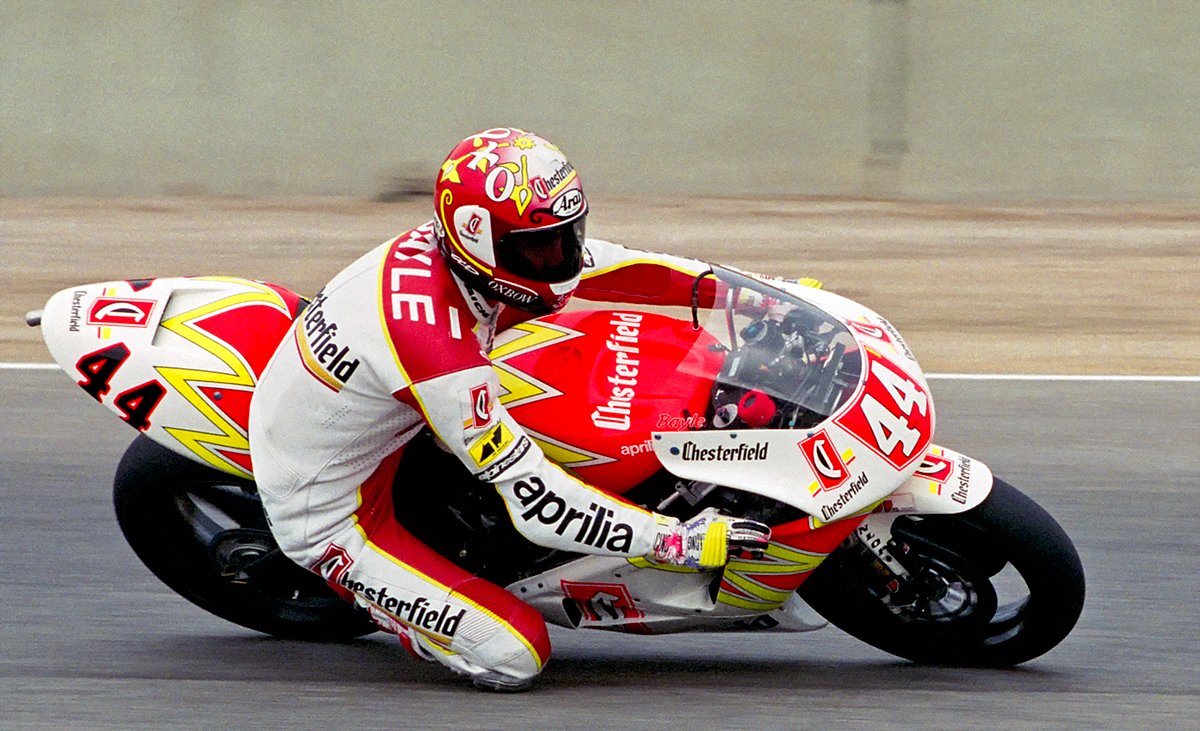
- Jean-Michel Bayle at the 1993 U.S. Grand Prix
- Nationality: French
- Born: 1 April 1969 (age 57) Manosque, Alpes-de-Haute-Provence, France

Motocross career
- Years active: 1986–1992
- Teams: Honda
- Championships: 1988 125cc World Champion; 1989 250cc World Champion; 1991 AMA 250cc Supercross Champion; 1991 AMA 250cc National Champion; 1991 AMA 500cc National Champion

Jean-Michel Bayle
- Nationality: (France) French
Motorcycle racing career statistics
Grand Prix motorcycle racing
Active years	1992 - 1999, 2002
First race	1992 250cc French Grand Prix
Last race	2002 MotoGP Italian Grand Prix
Team(s)	Aprilia, Yamaha, Modenas
Starts / Wins / Podiums / Poles / F. laps / Points; 82 / 0 / 0 / 3 / 0 / 336

Jean-Michel Bayle (born 1 April 1969) is a French former professional motorcycle racer. He was one of the most successful riders of his era, achieving success at the highest levels in both motocross and road racing.

== Biography ==
Born in Manosque, Alpes-de-Haute-Provence, Bayle won the FIM 125cc motocross world championship in 1988, and the 250cc motocross world championship a year later. He competed in the United States in 1991, becoming the only rider ever to win all three major AMA motocross championships in the same year (Supercross, 250cc and 500cc). Having won many of the major motocross championships, Bayle became one of the few riders to switch motorcycling disciplines, going from dirt track motocross events to pavement based road race events.

Bayle competed in the 250cc road racing world championship for the Aprilia factory racing team during the 1994 Grand Prix motorcycle racing season, and in 1996 moved up to the 500cc class for the Kenny Roberts-Yamaha team. He scored points once in 1999. He managed one pole position in the 250cc class and two poles in the 500cc division but, never managed to finish on the podium. In 2002, he teamed with Sébastien Gimbert and Nicolas Dussauge to win the Bol d'or and the 24 Hours of Le Mans endurance races. Bayle suffered serious injuries during the 2002 season and retired from road racing competition.

Bayle still competes in motocross and enduro events and campaigned in the French observed trials national championship. Bayle was inducted into the AMA Motorcycle Hall of Fame in 2000.

== Career statistics ==
=== Grand Prix motorcycle racing ===
==== Races by year ====
(key) (Races in bold indicate pole position) (Races in italics indicate fastest lap)

Year	Class	Bike	1	2	3	4	5	6	7	8	9	10	11	12	13	14	15	16	Pos.	Pts
1992	250cc	Honda	JPN	AUS	MAL	SPA	ITA	EUR	GER	NED	HUN	FRA; 24	GBR	BRA	RSA				NC	0
1993	250cc	Aprilia	AUS; 19	MAL; 16	JPN; 21	SPA; 14	AUT; 17	GER; 14	NED; 16	EUR; 18	RSM; 18	GBR; 8	CZE; Ret	ITA; 19	USA; Ret	FIM; 12			22nd	16
1994	250cc	Aprilia	AUS; 10	MAL; 7	JPN; 11	SPA; 8	AUT; 11	GER; 11	NED; 6	ITA; 8	FRA; 5	GBR; 5	CZE; 6	USA; Ret	ARG; 7	EUR; 8			8th	105
1995	250cc	Aprilia	AUS; Ret	MAL; 6	JPN; Ret	SPA; 9	GER; 6	ITA; Ret	NED; Ret	FRA; 11	GBR; Ret	CZE; 11	BRA; Ret	**ARG**; DNS	EUR; Ret				15th	37
1996	500cc	Yamaha	MAL; 6	INA; 8	JPN; 8	SPA; 7	ITA; 5	FRA; Ret	NED; 8	GER; 10	GBR; Ret	AUT; 9	**CZE**; 6	IMO; 4	CAT; Ret	BRA; 7	AUS; 5		9th	110
1997	500cc	Modenas	MAL; Ret	JPN; 14	SPA; 13	ITA; 8	AUT; 14	FRA; Ret	NED; Ret	IMO; 8	GER; Ret	BRA; 8	GBR; DNS	CZE; Ret	CAT; Ret	INA; Ret	AUS; 16		18th	31
1998	500cc	Yamaha	JPN	MAL	SPA	ITA	FRA	MAD	NED	GBR	GER	CZE; 8	**IMO**; 5	CAT; Ret	AUS	ARG; 7			16th	28
1999	500cc	Modenas	MAL; 12	JPN; Ret	SPA	FRA; Ret	ITA; Ret	CAT; Ret	NED	GBR	GER	CZE	IMO	VAL	AUS	RSA	BRA	ARG	28th	4
2002	MotoGP	Yamaha	JPN	RSA	SPA	FRA; 14	ITA; 13	CAT	NED	GBR	GER	CZE	POR	BRA	PAC	MAL	AUS	VAL	24th	5
