= Wilco Zeelenberg =

Dutch motorcycle racer

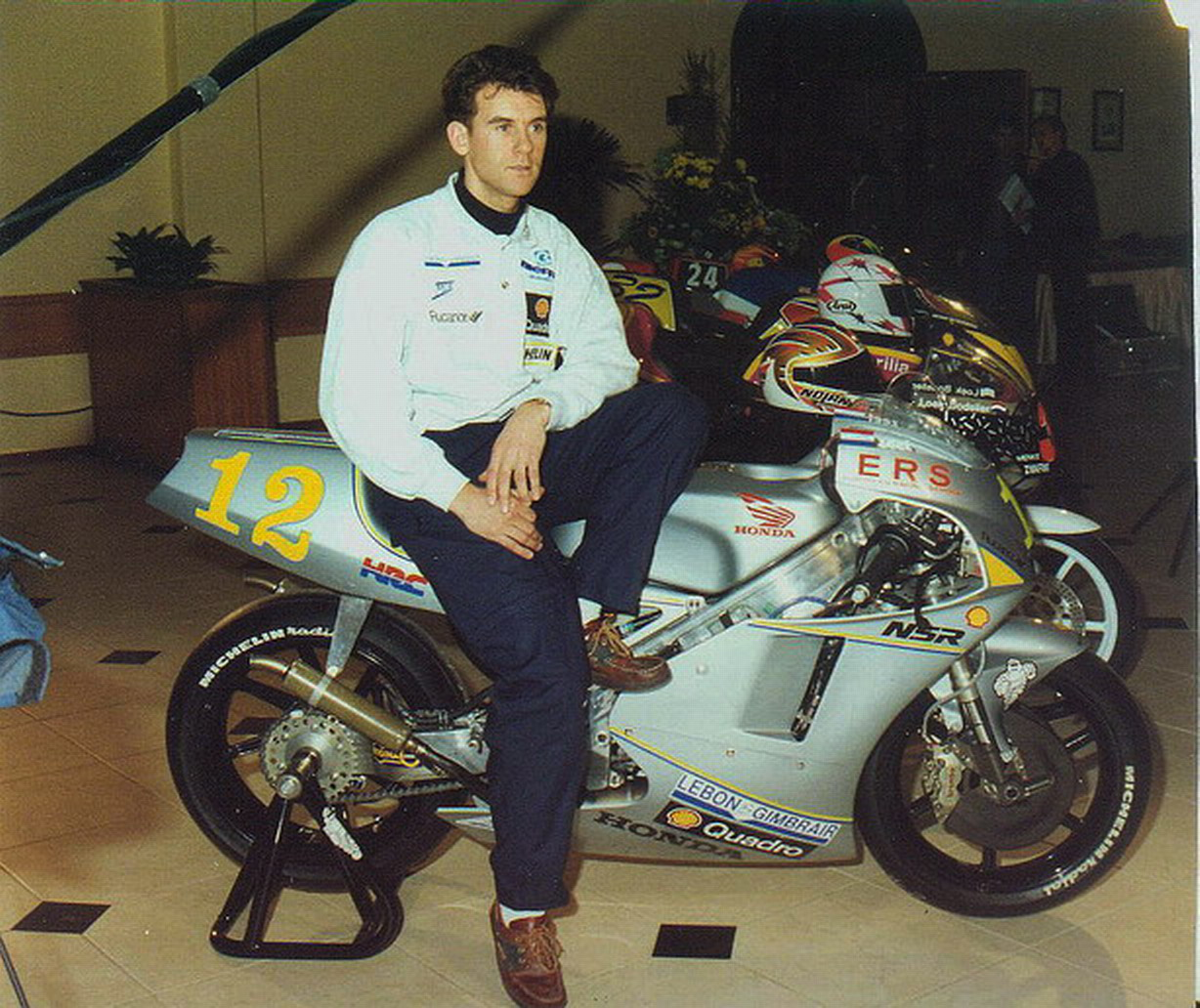
- Nationality: Dutch
- Born: 19 August 1966 (age 60); Bleiswijk, South Holland, Netherland
Motorcycle racing career statistics
Grand Prix motorcycle racing
Active years	1986 - 1995
First race	1985 80cc Dutch TT
Last race	1995 250cc Dutch TT
First win	1990 250cc German Grand Prix
Last win	1990 250cc German Grand Prix
Team(s)	Casal, Yamaha, Honda, Suzuki, Aprilia
Starts / Wins / Podiums / Poles / F. laps / Points; 95 / 1 / 11 / 1 / 1 / 511
Supersport World Championship
Active years	1997–2000
Manufacturers	Yamaha
Championships	0
2000 championship position	20th (23 pts)
Starts / Wins / Podiums / Poles / F. laps / Points; 43 / 2 / 3 / 1 / 1 / 250

Wilco Zeelenberg (born 19 August 1966) is a Dutch former professional Grand Prix motorcycle road racer and former team manager with the Trackhouse Racing MotoGP team

Born in Bleiswijk, Zeelenberg began racing motorcycles in motocross competitions before switching to road racing. Zeelenberg made his Grand Prix debut in the 80cc class in 1986. He won his first and only world championship race at the 1990 250cc German Grand Prix. His best season was in 1991, when he finished the season ranked fourth in the 250cc world championship riding a Honda.

Zeelenberg managed the Yamaha factory racing team in the Supersport World Championship with riders Cal Crutchlow and Fabien Foret. Crutchlow claimed the 2009 Supersport World Championship. In 2010, Zeelenberg took on the role as team manager for Jorge Lorenzo in the Yamaha MotoGP team. He later served the same role for Maverick Viñales after Lorenzo's departure from the squad.

With the new entry of the Petronas Yamaha SRT into MotoGP, Zeelenberg moved to become team manager with the new Yamaha satellite team.

== Career statistics ==
=== Grand Prix motorcycle racing ===
==== Races by year ====
(key) (Races in bold indicate pole position) (Races in italics indicate fastest lap)

Year	Class	Bike	1	2	3	4	5	6	7	8	9	10	11	12	13	14	15	Pos.	Pts
1985	80cc	Huvo-Casal	SPA	GER	NAT	YUG	NED; 12	FRA	RSM									NC	0
1986	80cc	Casal	SPA	NAT	GER	AUT	YUG	NED; Ret	GBR; 9	RSM; 15	BWU; 5							11th	8
1987	80cc	Casal	SPA; 18	GER; 18	NAT; 12	AUT; 16	YUG; DNS	NED; 18	GBR; Ret	CZE; 19	RSM; 18	POR; 15						NC	0
1987	125cc	Casal	SPA; DNS	GER; NC	NAT	AUT	NED; DNQ	FRA	GBR	SWE	CZE; DNQ	RSM	POR					NC	0
1988	250cc	Yamaha	JPN	USA	SPA	EXP	NAT	GER	AUT	NED; 15	BEL; 26	YUG	FRA	GBR; 18	SWE; 12	CZE	BRA	38th	5
1989	250cc	Honda	JPN	AUS	USA	SPA; 10	NAT; 14	GER; 14	AUT; 15	YUG; 9	NED; 8	BEL; 19	FRA; Ret	GBR; 10	SWE; 12	CZE; 11	BRA	13th	41
1990	250cc	Honda	JPN; 3	USA; 3	SPA; 22	NAT; 3	GER; 1	AUT; 4	YUG; DNS	NED; 3	BEL; Ret	FRA; Ret	GBR; Ret	SWE; 8	CZE; 8	HUN; 9	AUS; 5	5th	127
1991	250cc	Honda	**JPN**; 3	AUS; 4	USA; 2	SPA; Ret	ITA; 5	GER; 3	AUT; 3	EUR; 4	NED; 3	FRA; 7	GBR; 5	RSM; 5	CZE; Ret	VDM; 4	MAL; Ret	4th	158
1992	250cc	Suzuki	JPN; 7	AUS; 4	MAL; 7	SPA; 14	ITA; 5	EUR; Ret	GER	NED; 11	HUN; 5	FRA; 7	GBR; Ret	BRA; 11	RSA; 22			11th	38
1993	250cc	Aprilia	AUS; 11	MAL; Ret	JPN; 16	SPA; 6	AUT; Ret	GER; Ret	NED; 7	EUR; 8	RSM; Ret	GBR; 11	CZE; 12	ITA; 9	USA; Ret	FIM; 14		13th	50
1994	250cc	Honda	AUS; 9	MAL; 9	JPN; Ret	SPA; 9	AUT; Ret	GER; 10	NED; 3	ITA; 9	FRA; 10	GBR; 11	CZE; 9	USA; 9	ARG; 11	EUR; 12		11th	84
1995	250cc	Honda	AUS	MAL	JPN	SPA	GER	ITA	NED; Ret	FRA	GBR	CZE	BRA	ARG	EUR			NC	0

=== Supersport World Championship ===
==== Races by year ====
(key) (Races in bold indicate pole position) (Races in italics indicate fastest lap)

Year	Bike	1	2	3	4	5	6	7	8	9	10	11	Pos.	Pts
1997	Yamaha	SMR; 16	GBR; 7	GER; 7	ITA; 19	EUR; 10	AUT; 7	**NED**; 1	GER; 4	SPA; 12	JPN; 12	INA; 11	9th	84
1998	Yamaha	GBR; 7	ITA; 5	SPA; 5	GER; 6	SMR; Ret	RSA; 13	USA; 7	EUR; 18	AUT; 5	NED; Ret		8th	64
1999	Yamaha	RSA; 8	GBR; Ret	SPA; Ret	ITA; 1	GER; 14	SMR; 10	USA; 8	EUR; 15	AUT; 3	NED; 10	GER; 9	9th	79
2000	Yamaha	AUS; 7	JPN; 15	GBR; Ret	ITA; 14	GER; 13	SMR; 16	SPA; 15	EUR; 25	NED; 9	GER; 16	GBR; Ret	20th	23
