= 1993 Spanish motorcycle Grand Prix =

(Spain) 1993 Spanish Grand Prix
Race details
- Race 4 of 14 races in the 1993 Grand Prix motorcycle racing season
- Date: 2 May 1993
- Official name: Gran Premio de España Ducados
- Location: Circuito de Jerez
- Course: Permanent racing facility; 4.428 km (2.751 mi)

500cc
Pole position
- Rider: (United States) Kevin Schwantz
- Time: 1:44.459
Fastest lap
- Rider: (Brazil) Alex Barros
- Time: 1:44.659
Podium
- First: (United States) Kevin Schwantz
- Second: (United States) Wayne Rainey
- Third: (Spain) Àlex Crivillé

250cc
Pole position
- Rider: (Japan) Tetsuya Harada
- Time: 1:45.762
Fastest lap
- Rider: (Japan) Tetsuya Harada
- Time: 1:46.303
Podium
- First: (Japan) Tetsuya Harada
- Second: (Italy) Max Biaggi
- Third: (France) Jean-Philippe Ruggia

125cc
Pole position
- Rider: (Germany) Dirk Raudies
- Time: 1:51.576
Fastest lap
- Rider: (Germany) Ralf Waldmann
- Time: 1:51.989
Podium
- First: (Japan) Kazuto Sakata
- Second: (Germany) Ralf Waldmann
- Third: (Japan) Takeshi Tsujimura

The 1993 Spanish motorcycle Grand Prix was the fourth round of the 1993 Grand Prix motorcycle racing season. It took place on 2 May 1993 at the Circuito de Jerez.

The weekend was marred by a practice accident which resulted in the death of Japanese rider Nobuyuki Wakai after he had struck a spectator who had entered the pit lane without authorization.

== 500 cc race report ==
Kevin Schwantz’ 4th pole in 4 races.

Wayne Rainey takes the start from Schwantz and Alex Barros.

Schwantz and Rainey get a gap from Àlex Crivillé, Mick Doohan, with Barros closing.

Barros up to 3rd, and then arrives to Schwantz and Rainey.

Schwantz waves his teammate Barros through to 2nd, then Barros takes the lead from Rainey.

Barros and Schwantz get a gap, but Schwantz makes a mistake and goes into the grass. He saves it and remains in 2nd.

Barros in 1st and has a large lead with a couple of laps to go, but lowsides out of the race.

== 500 cc classification ==
Pos.	Rider	Team	Manufacturer	Time/Retired	Grid	Points
1	(United States) Kevin Schwantz	Lucky Strike Suzuki	Suzuki	47:39.627	1	25
2	(United States) Wayne Rainey	Marlboro Team Roberts	Yamaha	+1.664	3	20
3	(Spain) Àlex Crivillé	Marlboro Honda Pons	Honda	+12.280	6	16
4	(Australia) Mick Doohan	Rothmans Honda Team	Honda	+26.183	7	13
5	(Italy) Luca Cadalora	Marlboro Team Roberts	Yamaha	+47.828	4	11
6	(Australia) Daryl Beattie	Rothmans Honda Team	Honda	+54.886	11	10
7	(United Kingdom) Niall Mackenzie	Valvoline Team WCM	ROC Yamaha	+1:02.335	8	9
8	(Spain) Juan Lopez Mella	Lopez Mella Racing Team	ROC Yamaha	+1:06.680	10	8
9	(United Kingdom) Sean Emmett	Shell Team Harris	Harris Yamaha	+1:19.312	20	7
10	(Japan) Tsutomu Udagawa	Team Udagawa	ROC Yamaha	+1:40.054	15	6
11	(Italy) Corrado Catalano	Team ROC	ROC Yamaha	+1 Lap	24	5
12	(Italy) Lucio Pedercini	Team Pedercini	ROC Yamaha	+1 Lap	18	4
13	(Italy) Renato Colleoni	Team Elit	ROC Yamaha	+1 Lap	14	3
14	(France) José Kuhn	Euromoto	ROC Yamaha	+1 Lap	23	2
15	(Switzerland) Serge David	Team ROC	ROC Yamaha	+1 Lap	25	1
16	(Netherlands) Cees Doorakkers	Doorakkers Racing	Harris Yamaha	+1 Lap	29	
17	(United Kingdom) Kevin Mitchell	MBM Racing	ROC Yamaha	+1 Lap	26	
18	(Austria) Andreas Meklau	Austrian Racing Company	ROC Yamaha	+1 Lap	27	
19	(France) Jean d'Orgeix	Yamaha Motor France	Yamaha	+1 Lap		
20	(France) Bruno Bonhuil	MTD Objectif 500	ROC Yamaha	+1 Lap	33	
Ret	(Belgium) Laurent Naveau	Euro Team	ROC Yamaha	Retirement	16	
Ret	(United Kingdom) Jeremy McWilliams	Millar Racing	Yamaha	Retirement	17	
Ret	(France) Thierry Crine	Ville de Paris	ROC Yamaha	Retirement	19	
Ret	(Germany) Michael Rudroff	Rallye Sport	Harris Yamaha	Retirement	21	
Ret	(Australia) Matthew Mladin	Cagiva Team Agostini	Cagiva	Retirement	12	
Ret	(New Zealand) Simon Crafar	Peter Graves Racing Team	Harris Yamaha	Retirement	28	
Ret	(Japan) Shinichi Itoh	HRC Rothmans Honda	Honda	Retirement	9	
Ret	(Italy) Marco Papa	Librenti Corse	Librenti	Retirement	34	
Ret	(United States) Doug Chandler	Cagiva Team Agostini	Cagiva	Retirement	5	
Ret	(United States) Alan Scott	Team Harris	Harris Yamaha	Retirement	32	
Ret	(United Kingdom) John Reynolds	Padgett's Motorcycles	Harris Yamaha	Retirement	13	
Ret	(Switzerland) Jean Luc Romanens	Argus Racing Team	ROC Yamaha	Retirement	30	
Ret	(Brazil) Alex Barros	Lucky Strike Suzuki	Suzuki	Retirement	2	
DNS	(France) Bernard Garcia	Yamaha Motor France	Yamaha	Did not start		

== 250 cc classification ==
Pos	No	Rider	Manufacturer	Laps	Time/Retired	Grid	Points
1	31	(Japan) Tetsuya Harada	Yamaha	26	46:22.519	1	25
2	5	(Italy) Max Biaggi	Honda	26	+4.717	3	20
3	17	(France) Jean-Philippe Ruggia	Aprilia	26	+4.908	2	16
4	19	(United States) John Kocinski	Suzuki	26	+13.943	10	13
5	4	(Germany) Helmut Bradl	Honda	26	+24.795	9	11
6	11	(Netherlands) Wilco Zeelenberg	Aprilia	26	+32.284	11	10
7	18	(Japan) Tadayuki Okada	Honda	26	+36.275	8	9
8	10	(Italy) Doriano Romboni	Honda	26	+41.176	6	8
9	7	(Germany) Jochen Schmid	Yamaha	26	+45.326	13	7
10	65	(Italy) Loris Capirossi	Honda	26	+45.422	4	6
11	34	(Spain) Luis d'Antin	Honda	26	+45.457	14	5
12	3	(Italy) Pierfrancesco Chili	Yamaha	26	+55.208	7	4
13	28	(Switzerland) Adrian Bosshard	Honda	26	+58.483	16	3
14	44	(France) Jean-Michel Bayle	Aprilia	26	+1:02.020	21	2
15	16	(Austria) Andy Preining	Aprilia	26	+1:17.930	20	1
16	27	(France) Frédéric Protat	Aprilia	26	+1:22.214	22	
17	30	(Spain) Juan Borja	Honda	26	+1:22:611	24	
18	20	(Switzerland) Eskil Suter	Aprilia	26	+1:22.614	19	
19	23	(Switzerland) Bernard Haenggeli	Aprilia	26	+1:28.328	26	
20	12	(Italy) Gabriele Debbia	Honda	26	+1:36.157	23	
21	22	(Spain) Luis Maurel	Aprilia	26	+1:44.016	28	
22	32	(Germany) Volker Bähr	Honda	26	+1:44.077	32	
23	25	(Netherlands) Jurgen van den Goorbergh	Aprilia	26	+1:49.856	27	
24	53	(Spain) Alex Sirera	Yamaha	25	+1 Lap	33	
Ret	6	(Spain) Alberto Puig	Honda	17	Retirement	12	
Ret	24	(Netherlands) Patrick van den Goorbergh	Aprilia	15	Retirement	17	
Ret	43	(Italy) Massimo Pennacchioli	Honda	13	Retirement	34	
Ret	14	(Japan) Nobuatsu Aoki	Honda	6	Retirement	15	
Ret	21	(Italy) Paolo Casoli	Gilera	5	Retirement	18	
Ret	26	(Germany) Bernd Kassner	Aprilia	3	Retirement	29	
Ret	13	(Italy) Loris Reggiani	Aprilia	1	Retirement	5	
Ret	39	(Italy) Alessandro Gramigni	Gilera	0	Retirement	30	
DNS	8	(Spain) Carlos Cardús	Honda		Did not start	25	
DNS	15	(Japan) Nobuyuki Wakai	Suzuki		Fatal accident in Saturday	31	
DNS	51	(France) Jean-Pierre Jeandat	Aprilia		Did not start	35	
DNQ	54	(Spain) Miguel Castilla	Yamaha		Did not qualify	35	

Previous race: 1993 Japanese Grand Prix	FIM Grand Prix World Championship; 1993 season	Next race: 1993 Austrian Grand Prix
Previous race: 1992 Spanish Grand Prix	Spanish Grand Prix	Next race: 1994 Spanish Grand Prix
