= Moto Rumi =

Italian motorcycle company, 1949–1969

Rumi
- Industry: Motorcycle Manufacturer
- Founded: 1949 in Bergamo, Italy
- Founder: Donnino Rumi
- Defunct: 1969
- Fate: Defunct
- Headquarters: Bergamo, Italy
- Products: Motorcycles

The Moto Rumi organisation was formed at the beginning of the twentieth century and originally supplied cast components to the textile machinery industry. At the outbreak of World War II, Rumi became involved in the manufacture of armaments, miniature submarines and torpedoes. After the end of the war in 1950, Rumi decided to get involved in the manufacture of lightweight motorcycles. It was also decided to base the powerplant on the horizontal twin two stroke unit of 125 cc capacity.

In 1952, with the popularity of scooters, Rumi started manufacturing the Squirrel or Scoiottolo – a cast aluminum monocoque body with tubular swinging arm rear suspension and teleforks with 14 inch wheels and three gears. Subsequent models had a four speed gearbox and electric starter and were reputed to be the fastest scooters then in production.

== 1952 ==
In 1952, Rumi was producing the "sports" and "super sport" motorcycle models (single and twin carburettor versions respectively). The "super sport" was superseded by the "Competizione" or "Gobbetto", a pure factory racer.

== 1954 ==
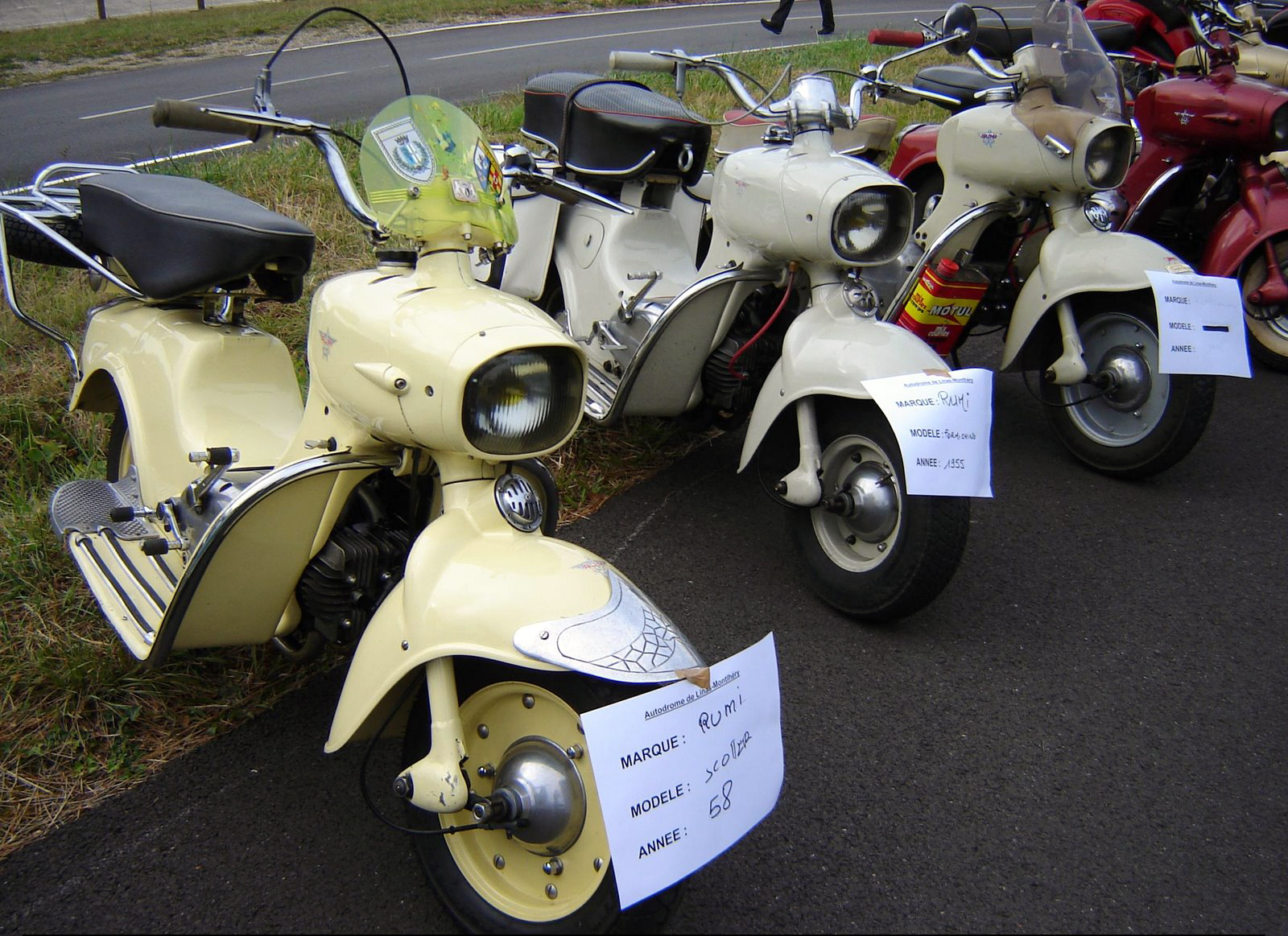
A swarm of Formichini at the Montlhéry autodrome

1954 brought the production of the Formichino or Little Ant scooter, which was reputedly designed by Ing Salvatti. A "Competizione" won the Italian National Championship in 1954.

The entire body (with exception of the front forks, crash rails and legshields) was produced in cast aluminium, with the front and rear castings bolted to the engine to form a monocoque which resulted in a light and rigid construction. The rear swinging arm, chaincase and silencer box were also constructed in cast aluminium. These models originally had 8 inch wheels, but by 1958 they reverted to 10 inch which gave a better stability and ground clearance.

== 1955 ==
During 1955, the "Competizione" was superseded by the "Junior Corsa" and "Junior Gentleman".

== 1958 ==
In 1958, Rumi also produced a sports version called the "Tipo Sport" which had a 22 mm carburettor, larger exhaust pipes and a higher compression ratio.

== 1957/58 ==
In 1957/58 and 1960, Rumi won the famous Bol d'Or 24-hour races at Montlhery in France and subsequently Rumi produced the Bol d'Or scooter named after the race.

In the UK, it sported dropped handlebars, chrome plated aluminium cylinders and twin carburettors but the French version favoured the Bol d'or with a single 22 mm carburettor.

== Liquidation ==
During the 1960s, Rumi went into liquidation and Donnino Rumi went back to being a sculptor and artist.

== See also ==
- List of Italian companies
- List of motorcycle manufacturers
