= 1993 German motorcycle Grand Prix =

(Germany) 1993 German Grand Prix
Race details
- Race 6 of 14 races in the 1993 Grand Prix motorcycle racing season
- Date: 13 June 1993
- Official name: Grand Prix von Deutschland
- Location: Hockenheimring
- Course: Permanent racing facility; 6.823 km (4.240 mi)

500cc
Pole position
- Rider: (Japan) Shinichi Itoh
- Time: 1:58.976
Fastest lap
- Rider: (Australia) Mick Doohan
- Time: 1:58.852
Podium
- First: (Australia) Daryl Beattie
- Second: (United States) Kevin Schwantz
- Third: (Japan) Shinichi Itoh

250cc
Pole position
- Rider: (Italy) Doriano Romboni
- Time: 2:05.066
Fastest lap
- Rider: (Italy) Loris Capirossi
- Time: 2:04.889
Podium
- First: (Italy) Doriano Romboni
- Second: (Italy) Loris Capirossi
- Third: (Germany) Helmut Bradl

125cc
Pole position
- Rider: (Germany) Dirk Raudies
- Time: 2:16.885
Fastest lap
- Rider: (Japan) Kazuto Sakata
- Time: 2:17.301
Podium
- First: (Germany) Dirk Raudies
- Second: (Japan) Kazuto Sakata
- Third: (Japan) Takeshi Tsujimura

The 1993 German motorcycle Grand Prix was the sixth round of the 1993 Grand Prix motorcycle racing season. It took place on 13 June 1993, at the Hockenheim circuit.

== 500 cc race report ==
Shinichi Itoh on pole, Wayne Rainey again on the 2nd row.

Àlex Crivillé to the front from Daryl Beattie, Schwantz, Mick Doohan and Rainey.

Doohan takes the lead; Rainey getting dropped. Serious accident for the Italian Corrado Catalano, he fell, was hit by his motorcycle and for some days was in a comatose.

Doohan has a mechanical problem and drops out; Shinichi Itoh passes Crivillé for 3rd, with Schwantz in 1st and Beattie in 2nd.

Into the last lap, Beattie is in front of Schwantz; Itoh twice comes alongside Schwantz and thwarts Schwantz’ attempts to brake-pass Beattie. Itoh becomes the first rider to pass 200 mph in a speed trap.

Schwantz seems happy with second because Rainey is so far behind, and is now 14 points behind Schwantz.

== 500 cc classification ==
Pos.	Rider	Team	Manufacturer	Time/Retired	Points
1	(Australia) Daryl Beattie	Rothmans Honda Team	Honda	36:05.475	25
2	(United States) Kevin Schwantz	Lucky Strike Suzuki	Suzuki	+0.084	20
3	(Japan) Shinichi Itoh	HRC Rothmans Honda	Honda	+0.537	16
4	(Spain) Àlex Crivillé	Marlboro Honda Pons	Honda	+5.937	13
5	(United States) Wayne Rainey	Marlboro Team Roberts	Yamaha	+28.055	11
6	(United States) Doug Chandler	Cagiva Team Agostini	Cagiva	+48.350	10
7	(Australia) Matthew Mladin	Cagiva Team Agostini	Cagiva	+52.797	9
8	(Italy) Luca Cadalora	Marlboro Team Roberts	Yamaha	+52.902	8
9	(United Kingdom) Niall Mackenzie	Valvoline Team WCM	ROC Yamaha	+53.354	7
10	(France) Bernard Garcia	Yamaha Motor France	ROC Yamaha	+1:21.457	6
11	(Japan) Tsutomu Udagawa	Team Udagawa	ROC Yamaha	+1:46.086	5
12	(Belgium) Laurent Naveau	Euro Team	ROC Yamaha	+1:46.419	4
13	(Germany) Michael Rudroff	Rallye Sport	Harris Yamaha	+1:46.679	3
14	(Spain) Juan Lopez Mella	Lopez Mella Racing Team	ROC Yamaha	+1:46.921	2
15	(France) Bruno Bonhuil	MTD Objectif 500	ROC Yamaha	+1:47.097	1
16	(Switzerland) Serge David	Team ROC	ROC Yamaha	+1:47.679	
17	(United Kingdom) John Reynolds	Padgett's Motorcycles	Harris Yamaha	+1:54.495	
18	(Austria) Andreas Meklau	Austrian Racing Company	ROC Yamaha	+2:00.365	
19	(Italy) Renato Colleoni	Team Elit	ROC Yamaha	+1 Lap	
20	(Netherlands) Cees Doorakkers	Doorakkers Racing	Harris Yamaha	+1 Lap	
Ret	(New Zealand) Simon Crafar	Peter Graves Racing Team	Harris Yamaha	Retirement	
Ret	(Australia) Mick Doohan	Rothmans Honda Team	Honda	Retirement	
Ret	(Switzerland) Jean Luc Romanens	Argus Racing Team	ROC Yamaha	Retirement	
Ret	(United Kingdom) Jeremy McWilliams	Millar Racing	Yamaha	Retirement	
Ret	(United Kingdom) Kevin Mitchell	MBM Racing	Harris Yamaha	Retirement	
Ret	(United Kingdom) Darren Dixon	Team Harris	Harris Yamaha	Retirement	
Ret	(Brazil) Alex Barros	Lucky Strike Suzuki	Suzuki	Retirement	
Ret	(Italy) Corrado Catalano	Team ROC	ROC Yamaha	Retirement	
Ret	(France) Thierry Crine	Ville de Paris	ROC Yamaha	Retirement	
Ret	(France) José Kuhn	Euromoto	Yamaha	Retirement	
Ret	(Switzerland) Nicholas Schmassman	Team Schmassman	ROC Yamaha	Retirement	
Ret	(United Kingdom) Sean Emmett	Shell Team Harris	Harris Yamaha	Retirement	
DNS	(Italy) Lucio Pedercini	Team Pedercini	ROC Yamaha	Did not start	
DNQ	(Italy) Marco Papa	Librenti Corse	Librenti	Did not qualify	

== 250 cc classification ==
Pos	Rider	Manufacturer	Time/Retired	Points
1	(Italy) Doriano Romboni	Honda	33:53.776	25
2	(Italy) Loris Capirossi	Honda	+0.090	20
3	(Germany) Helmut Bradl	Honda	+0.384	16
4	(Italy) Max Biaggi	Honda	+2.346	13
5	(Italy) Loris Reggiani	Aprilia	+2.411	11
6	(Japan) Tetsuya Harada	Yamaha	+2.537	10
7	(Italy) Pierfrancesco Chili	Yamaha	+3.845	9
8	(France) Jean-Philippe Ruggia	Aprilia	+3.985	8
9	(Spain) Carlos Cardús	Honda	+4.893	7
10	(Spain) Luis d'Antin	Honda	+25.044	6
11	(Spain) Alberto Puig	Honda	+25.136	5
12	(United States) John Kocinski	Suzuki	+25.463	4
13	(Germany) Jochen Schmid	Yamaha	+47.065	3
14	(France) Jean-Michel Bayle	Aprilia	+1:15.546	2
15	(Spain) Juan Borja	Honda	+1:15.769	1
16	(France) Frédéric Protat	Aprilia	+1:15.858	
17	(Germany) Adi Stadler	Honda	+1:16.349	
18	(Germany) Bernd Kassner	Aprilia	+1:16:464	
19	(Italy) Paolo Casoli	Gilera	+1:26.061	
20	(Italy) Gabriele Debbia	Honda	+1:40.049	
21	(Switzerland) Adrian Bosshard	Honda	+1:47.492	
22	(Italy) Massimo Pennacchioli	Honda	+1:59.498	
23	(Switzerland) Bernard Haenggeli	Aprilia	+2:41.806	
24	(Italy) Alessandro Gramigni	Gilera	+1 Lap	
Ret	(Austria) Andreas Preining	Aprilia	Retirement	
Ret	(Germany) Volker Bähr	Honda	Retirement	
Ret	(Netherlands) Jurgen van den Goorbergh	Aprilia	Retirement	
Ret	(Spain) Luis Maurel	Aprilia	Retirement	
Ret	(Netherlands) Patrick van den Goorbergh	Aprilia	Retirement	
Ret	(Switzerland) Eskil Suter	Aprilia	Retirement	
Ret	(Netherlands) Wilco Zeelenberg	Aprilia	Retirement	
Ret	(France) Jean-Pierre Jeandat	Aprilia	Retirement	
DNS	(Japan) Nobuatsu Aoki	Honda	Did not start	

Previous race: 1993 Austrian Grand Prix	FIM Grand Prix World Championship; 1993 season	Next race: 1993 Dutch TT
Previous race: 1992 German Grand Prix	German Grand Prix	Next race: 1994 German Grand Prix
