= 1993 Dutch TT =

(Netherlands) 1993 Dutch Grand Prix
Race details
- Race 7 of 14 races in the 1993 Grand Prix motorcycle racing season
- Date: 26 June 1993
- Official name: Lucky Strike Dutch Grand Prix
- Location: TT Circuit Assen
- Course: Permanent racing facility; 6.049 km (3.759 mi)

500cc
Pole position
- Rider: (Australia) Mick Doohan
- Time: 2:03.267
Fastest lap
- Rider: (Brazil) Alex Barros
- Time: 2:03.829
Podium
- First: (United States) Kevin Schwantz
- Second: (Australia) Mick Doohan
- Third: (Spain) Àlex Crivillé

250cc
Pole position
- Rider: (Italy) Loris Capirossi
- Time: 2:06.007
Fastest lap
- Rider: (United States) John Kocinski
- Time: 2:06.951
Podium
- First: (Italy) Loris Capirossi
- Second: (Japan) Tetsuya Harada
- Third: (United States) John Kocinski

125cc
Pole position
- Rider: (Germany) Dirk Raudies
- Time: 2:16.308
Fastest lap
- Rider: (Japan) Kazuto Sakata
- Time: 2:16.539
Podium
- First: (Germany) Dirk Raudies
- Second: (Japan) Kazuto Sakata
- Third: (Austria) Manfred Baumann

The 1993 Dutch TT was the seventh round of the 1993 Grand Prix motorcycle racing season. It took place on 26 June 1993 at the TT Circuit Assen located in Assen, Netherlands.

== 500 cc race report ==
Honda announces that Shinichi Itoh’s bike is fuel-injected not carburated, and that this is the first time it is being used. Wayne Rainey wants to use a ROC chassis instead of the factory one which was overstiff, but wasn’t allowed to.

Mick Doohan on pole where he had his accident the previous year.

Kevin Schwantz gets the start from Daryl Beattie and Doohan.

Beattie crashes out of third and Mat Mladin’s crashing bike in the same turn sends the marshalls running. Beattie walks away from it.

There’s a 3-way fight for 1st between Schwantz, Alex Barros and Doohan.

Barros crashes out of the lead, tumbling hard through the furrowed gravel, but is able to walk to the barriers. The way Barros was tossed up by the furrows in the gravel is a foreshadowing of Rainey at Misano.

Schwantz leads Doohan into the chicane on the last lap and Doohan tries a desperate pass, but Schwantz holds him off. Schwantz is now 28 points ahead of Rainey.

== 500 cc classification ==
Pos.	Rider	Team	Manufacturer	Time/Retired	Points
1	(United States) Kevin Schwantz	Lucky Strike Suzuki	Suzuki	41:35.943	25
2	(Australia) Mick Doohan	Rothmans Honda Team	Honda	+0.829	20
3	(Spain) Àlex Crivillé	Marlboro Honda Pons	Honda	+13.518	16
4	(United States) Doug Chandler	Cagiva Team Agostini	Cagiva	+13.822	13
5	(United States) Wayne Rainey	Marlboro Team Roberts	Yamaha	+18.063	11
6	(Japan) Shinichi Itoh	HRC Rothmans Honda	Honda	+34.405	10
7	(Italy) Luca Cadalora	Marlboro Team Roberts	Yamaha	+56.425	9
8	(United Kingdom) Niall Mackenzie	Valvoline Team WCM	ROC Yamaha	+56.672	8
9	(New Zealand) Simon Crafar	Peter Graves Racing Team	Harris Yamaha	+1:11.241	7
10	(United Kingdom) John Reynolds	Padgett's Motorcycles	Harris Yamaha	+1:14.408	6
11	(France) Bernard Garcia	Yamaha Motor France	Yamaha	+1:14.429	5
12	(Germany) Michael Rudroff	Rallye Sport	Harris Yamaha	+1:22.378	4
13	(France) José Kuhn	Euromoto	ROC Yamaha	+1:22.827	3
14	(Japan) Tsutomu Udagawa	Team Udagawa	ROC Yamaha	+1:26.043	2
15	(Belgium) Laurent Naveau	Euro Team	ROC Yamaha	+1:46.568	1
16	(United Kingdom) Sean Emmett	Shell Team Harris	Harris Yamaha	+1:46.727	
17	(Austria) Andreas Meklau	Austrian Racing Company	ROC Yamaha	+1:58.929	
18	(Italy) Renato Colleoni	Team Elit	ROC Yamaha	+1:59.991	
19	(United Kingdom) Kevin Mitchell	MBM Racing	Harris Yamaha	+2:59.095	
20	(New Zealand) Andrew Stroud	Team Harris	Harris Yamaha	+1 Lap	
21	(Netherlands) Cees Doorakkers	Doorakkers Racing	Harris Yamaha	+1 Lap	
Ret	(Brazil) Alex Barros	Lucky Strike Suzuki	Suzuki	Retirement	
Ret	(Switzerland) Serge David	Team ROC	ROC Yamaha	Retirement	
Ret	(France) Thierry Crine	Ville de Paris	ROC Yamaha	Retirement	
Ret	(Italy) Marco Papa	Librenti Corse	Librenti	Retirement	
Ret	(Switzerland) Jean Luc Romanens	Argus Racing Team	ROC Yamaha	Retirement	
Ret	(Spain) Juan Lopez Mella	Lopez Mella Racing Team	ROC Yamaha	Retirement	
Ret	(United Kingdom) Jeremy McWilliams	Millar Racing	Yamaha	Retirement	
Ret	(Australia) Matthew Mladin	Cagiva Team Agostini	Cagiva	Retirement	
Ret	(France) Bruno Bonhuil	MTD Objectif 500	ROC Yamaha	Retirement	
Ret	(Australia) Daryl Beattie	Rothmans Honda Team	Honda	Retirement	

== 250 cc classification ==
Pos	Rider	Manufacturer	Time/Retired	Points
1	(Italy) Loris Capirossi	Honda	38:26.004	25
2	(Japan) Tetsuya Harada	Yamaha	+3.917	20
3	(United States) John Kocinski	Suzuki	+4.680	16
4	(France) Jean-Philippe Ruggia	Aprilia	+5.578	13
5	(Germany) Helmut Bradl	Honda	+9.391	11
6	(Italy) Loris Reggiani	Aprilia	+14.448	10
7	(Netherlands) Wilco Zeelenberg	Aprilia	+14.512	9
8	(Italy) Pierfrancesco Chili	Yamaha	+14.802	8
9	(Spain) Alberto Puig	Honda	+24.690	7
10	(Japan) Nobuatsu Aoki	Honda	+32.770	6
11	(Spain) Luis d'Antin	Honda	+45.934	5
12	(Switzerland) Adrian Bosshard	Honda	+52.218	4
13	(Austria) Andreas Preining	Aprilia	+52.417	3
14	(Switzerland) Eskil Suter	Aprilia	+52.590	2
15	(Netherlands) Jurgen van den Goorbergh	Aprilia	+1:03.448	1
16	(France) Jean-Michel Bayle	Aprilia	+1:18.804	
17	(Germany) Bernd Kassner	Aprilia	+1:19.624	
18	(Switzerland) Bernard Haenggeli	Aprilia	+1:21.790	
19	(Germany) Volker Bähr	Honda	+1:32.458	
20	(Italy) Massimo Pennacchioli	Honda	+1 Lap	
21	(Netherlands) Rudie Markink	Yamaha	+1 Lap	
Ret	(France) Frédéric Protat	Aprilia	Retirement	
Ret	(Italy) Alessandro Gramigni	Gilera	Retirement	
Ret	(Spain) Carlos Cardús	Honda	Retirement	
Ret	(Germany) Jochen Schmid	Yamaha	Retirement	
Ret	(Netherlands) Patrick van den Goorbergh	Aprilia	Retirement	
Ret	(Netherlands) Matthieu van Gaalen	Aprilia	Retirement	
Ret	(Netherlands) Loek Bodelier	Honda	Retirement	
Ret	(France) Jean-Pierre Jeandat	Aprilia	Retirement	
Ret	(Italy) Max Biaggi	Honda	Retirement	
Ret	(Spain) Luis Maurel	Aprilia	Retirement	
Ret	(Italy) Paolo Casoli	Gilera	Retirement	
Ret	(Japan) Tadayuki Okada	Honda	Retirement	
Ret	(Italy) Doriano Romboni	Honda	Retirement	
Ret	(Spain) Juan Borja	Honda	Retirement	

Previous race: 1993 German Grand Prix	FIM Grand Prix World Championship; 1993 season	Next race: 1993 European Grand Prix
Previous race: 1992 Dutch TT	Dutch TT	Next race: 1994 Dutch TT
