= 1993 Austrian motorcycle Grand Prix =

(Austria) 1993 Austrian Grand Prix
Race details
- Race 5 of 14 races in the 1993 Grand Prix motorcycle racing season
- Date: 16 May 1993
- Official name: Austrian Grand Prix
- Location: Salzburgring
- Course: Permanent racing facility; 4.243 km (2.636 mi)

500cc
Pole position
- Rider: (United States) Kevin Schwantz
- Time: 1:17.900
Fastest lap
- Rider: (Australia) Mick Doohan
- Time: 1:18.021
Podium
- First: (United States) Kevin Schwantz
- Second: (Australia) Mick Doohan
- Third: (United States) Wayne Rainey

250cc
Pole position
- Rider: (Italy) Doriano Romboni
- Time: 1:21.377
Fastest lap
- Rider: (Germany) Helmut Bradl
- Time: 1:21.269
Podium
- First: (Italy) Doriano Romboni
- Second: (Italy) Loris Capirossi
- Third: (Germany) Helmut Bradl

125cc
Pole position
- Rider: (Japan) Kazuto Sakata
- Time: 1:29.623
Fastest lap
- Rider: (Japan) Takeshi Tsujimura
- Time: 1:29.241
Podium
- First: (Japan) Takeshi Tsujimura
- Second: (Japan) Kazuto Sakata
- Third: (Germany) Dirk Raudies

The 1993 Austrian motorcycle Grand Prix was the fifth round of the 1993 Grand Prix motorcycle racing season. It took place on 16 May 1993 at the Salzburgring.

== 500 cc race report ==
Mick Doohan’s rear brake is now operated by a thumb-lever on the left side. This is to compensate for not being able to use the right foot lever because of injuries from Assen '92.

Kevin Schwantz’ 5th pole in a row. Luca Cadalora takes the start from Doug Chandler, Doohan, Alex Barros and Schwantz.

Wayne Rainey and Schwantz start swapping 4th position.

Doohan into 1st, but Schwantz takes over the lead, then it's a gap back to Rainey and Barros. Rainey is happy with his third place after chatter and clutch trouble and having qualified 1.3 seconds behind Schwantz.

== 500cc classification ==
Pos.	Rider	Team	Manufacturer	Time/Retired	Points
1	(United States) Kevin Schwantz	Lucky Strike Suzuki	Suzuki	38:15.613	25
2	(Australia) Mick Doohan	Rothmans Honda Team	Honda	+0.493	20
3	(United States) Wayne Rainey	Marlboro Team Roberts	Yamaha	+4.892	16
4	(Brazil) Alex Barros	Lucky Strike Suzuki	Suzuki	+4.954	13
5	(Italy) Luca Cadalora	Marlboro Team Roberts	Yamaha	+16.550	11
6	(Japan) Shinichi Itoh	HRC Rothmans Honda	Honda	+22.595	10
7	(Australia) Daryl Beattie	Rothmans Honda Team	Honda	+28.110	9
8	(United States) Doug Chandler	Cagiva Team Agostini	Cagiva	+38.559	8
9	(France) José Kuhn	Euromoto	ROC Yamaha	+1:17.751	7
10	(Australia) Matthew Mladin	Cagiva Team Agostini	Cagiva	+1:17.820	6
11	(United Kingdom) Niall Mackenzie	Valvoline Team WCM	ROC Yamaha	+1:17.920	5
12	(Belgium) Laurent Naveau	Euro Team	ROC Yamaha	+1 Lap	4
13	(Spain) Juan Lopez Mella	Lopez Mella Racing Team	ROC Yamaha	+1 Lap	3
14	(United Kingdom) John Reynolds	Padgett's Motorcycles	Harris Yamaha	+1 Lap	2
15	(Japan) Tsutomu Udagawa	Team Udagawa	ROC Yamaha	+1 Lap	1
16	(United Kingdom) Sean Emmett	Shell Team Harris	Harris Yamaha	+1 Lap	
17	(Germany) Michael Rudroff	Rallye Sport	Harris Yamaha	+1 Lap	
18	(New Zealand) Simon Crafar	Peter Graves Racing Team	Harris Yamaha	+1 Lap	
19	(France) Thierry Crine	Ville de Paris	ROC Yamaha	+1 Lap	
20	(United Kingdom) Jeremy McWilliams	Millar Racing	Yamaha	+1 Lap	
21	(Italy) Renato Colleoni	Team Elit	ROC Yamaha	+1 Lap	
22	(France) Bruno Bonhuil	MTD Objectif 500	ROC Yamaha	+1 Lap	
23	(France) Bernard Garcia	Yamaha Motor France	Yamaha	+1 Lap	
24	(Austria) Andreas Meklau	Austrian Racing Company	ROC Yamaha	+1 Lap	
25	(Italy) Marco Papa	Librenti Corse	Librenti	+2 Laps	
Ret	(Switzerland) Serge David	Team ROC	ROC Yamaha	Retirement	
Ret	(United Kingdom) Kevin Mitchell	MBM Racing	Harris Yamaha	Retirement	
Ret	(United States) Alan Scott	Team Harris	Harris Yamaha	Retirement	
Ret	(Netherlands) Cees Doorakkers	Doorakkers Racing	Harris Yamaha	Retirement	
Ret	(Italy) Lucio Pedercini	Team Pedercini	ROC Yamaha	Retirement	
Ret	(Spain) Àlex Crivillé	Marlboro Honda Pons	Honda	Retirement	
Ret	(Italy) Corrado Catalano	Team ROC	ROC Yamaha	Retirement	

== 250cc classification ==
Pos	Rider	Manufacturer	Time/Retired	Points
1	(Italy) Doriano Romboni	Honda	35:48.648	25
2	(Italy) Loris Capirossi	Honda	+0.050	20
3	(Germany) Helmut Bradl	Honda	+0.407	16
4	(Italy) Loris Reggiani	Aprilia	+14.888	13
5	(Italy) Max Biaggi	Honda	+15.051	11
6	(Japan) Tetsuya Harada	Yamaha	+15.105	10
7	(United States) John Kocinski	Suzuki	+26.254	9
8	(Italy) Pierfrancesco Chili	Yamaha	+26.320	8
9	(Spain) Alberto Puig	Honda	+31.846	7
10	(Austria) Andreas Preining	Aprilia	+32.287	6
11	(Switzerland) Eskil Suter	Aprilia	+47.428	5
12	(Spain) Luis d'Antin	Honda	+1:01.330	4
13	(Switzerland) Adrian Bosshard	Honda	+1:01.439	3
14	(Germany) Jochen Schmid	Yamaha	+1:01.692	2
15	(Netherlands) Patrick vd Goorbergh	Aprilia	+1:01.815	1
16	(Spain) Luis Maurel	Aprilia	+1 Lap	
17	(France) Jean-Michel Bayle	Aprilia	+1 Lap	
18	(Italy) Alessandro Gramigni	Gilera	+1 Lap	
19	(France) Jean-Pierre Jeandat	Aprilia	+1 Lap	
20	(Netherlands) Jurgen vd Goorbergh	Aprilia	+1 Lap	
21	(Italy) Massimo Pennacchioli	Honda	+1 Lap	
22	(Italy) Gabriele Debbia	Honda	+1 Lap	
Ret	(France) Jean-Philippe Ruggia	Aprilia	Retirement	
Ret	(Germany) Bernd Kassner	Aprilia	Retirement	
Ret	(Japan) Nobuatsu Aoki	Honda	Retirement	
Ret	(Italy) Paolo Casoli	Gilera	Retirement	
Ret	(Japan) Tadayuki Okada	Honda	Retirement	
Ret	(Germany) Volker Bähr	Honda	Retirement	
Ret	(Austria) Hannes Maxwald	Aprilia	Retirement	
Ret	(Switzerland) Bernard Haenggeli	Aprilia	Retirement	
Ret	(Spain) Juan Borja	Honda	Retirement	
Ret	(France) Frédéric Protat	Aprilia	Retirement	
Ret	(Netherlands) Wilco Zeelenberg	Aprilia	Retirement	
DNS	(Austria) Alexander Witting	Aprilia	Did not start	

Previous race: 1993 Spanish Grand Prix	FIM Grand Prix World Championship; 1993 season	Next race: 1993 German Grand Prix
Previous race: 1991 Austrian Grand Prix	Austrian Grand Prix	Next race: 1994 Austrian Grand Prix
