= 1993 European motorcycle Grand Prix =

(Europe) 1993 European Grand Prix
Race details
- Race 8 of 14 races in the 1993 Grand Prix motorcycle racing season
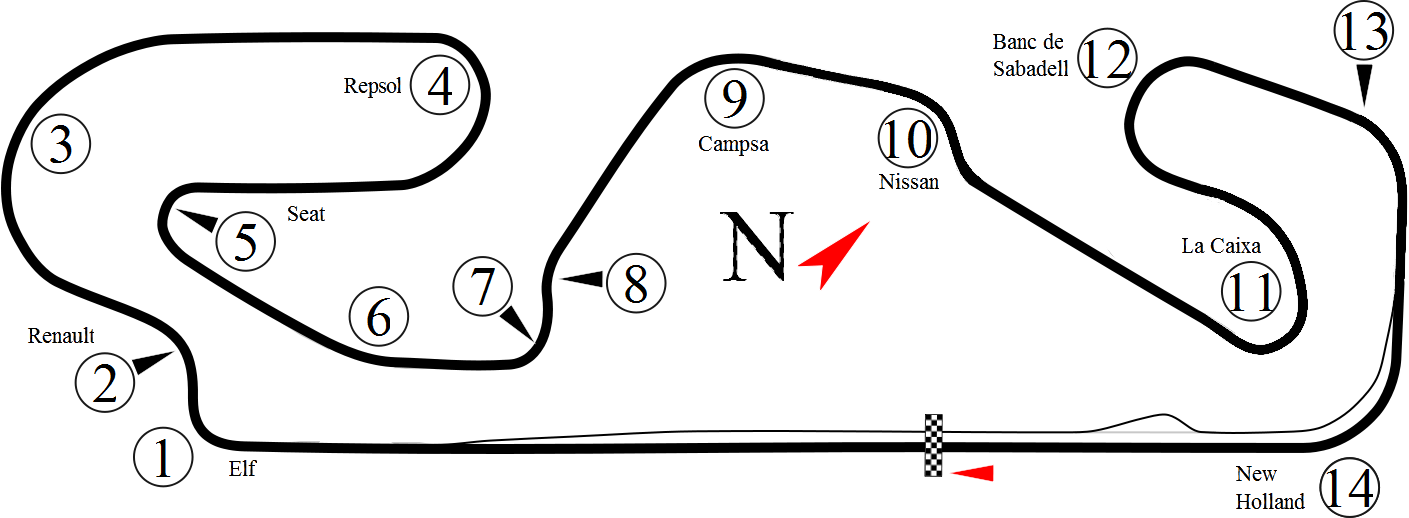
- Date: 4 July 1993
- Official name: Gran Premi Pepsi d'Europa
- Location: Circuit de Catalunya
- Course: Permanent racing facility; 4.747 km (2.950 mi)

500cc
Pole position
- Rider: (Australia) Mick Doohan
- Time: 1:48.947
Fastest lap
- Rider: (United States) Wayne Rainey
- Time: 1:49.340
Podium
- First: (United States) Wayne Rainey
- Second: (Australia) Mick Doohan
- Third: (United States) Kevin Schwantz

250cc
Pole position
- Rider: (Italy) Max Biaggi
- Time: 1:50.701
Fastest lap
- Rider: (Italy) Max Biaggi
- Time: 1:51.661
Podium
- First: (Italy) Max Biaggi
- Second: (Japan) Tadayuki Okada
- Third: (Spain) Alberto Puig

125cc
Pole position
- Rider: (Japan) Takeshi Tsujimura
- Time: 1:56.699
Fastest lap
- Rider: (Germany) Ralf Waldmann
- Time: 1:57.230
Podium
- First: (Japan) Noboru Ueda
- Second: (Germany) Ralf Waldmann
- Third: (Japan) Akira Saito

The 1993 European motorcycle Grand Prix was the eighth round of the 1993 Grand Prix motorcycle racing season. It took place on the 4 July 1993, at the Circuit de Catalunya. This was the 500th race to contribute to the Grand Prix motorcycle racing championship.

== 500 cc race report ==
Yamaha allows Wayne Rainey to use a chassis from the ROC team.

Mick Doohan on pole. Rainey gets the start from Doohan and Kevin Schwantz.

Àlex Crivillé crashes out of 4th. Shinichi Itoh touches Doug Chandler’s back tire and crashes out, taking Chandler with him.

Rainey gets a gap to Doohan, then a gap to Schwantz. Rainey credits the wind more than the new frame: “The tailwind down the straight helped the Yamaha’s speed, but coming the other way I was able to use the wind to help get the bike to turn in.”

== 500 cc classification ==
Pos.	Rider	Team	Manufacturer	Time/Retired	Points
1	(United States) Wayne Rainey	Marlboro Team Roberts	Yamaha	45:58.314	25
2	(Australia) Mick Doohan	Rothmans Honda Team	Honda	+3.898	20
3	(United States) Kevin Schwantz	Lucky Strike Suzuki	Suzuki	+18.992	16
4	(Australia) Daryl Beattie	Rothmans Honda Team	Honda	+46.625	13
5	(Brazil) Alex Barros	Lucky Strike Suzuki	Suzuki	+55.799	11
6	(United Kingdom) Niall Mackenzie	Valvoline Team WCM	ROC Yamaha	+55.806	10
7	(Spain) Juan Lopez Mella	Lopez Mella Racing Team	ROC Yamaha	+1:05.880	9
8	(France) José Kuhn	Euromoto	ROC Yamaha	+1:05.962	8
9	(Spain) Juan Garriga	Cagiva Corse	Cagiva	+1:36.568	7
10	(Italy) Renato Colleoni	Team Elit	ROC Yamaha	+1:46.964	6
11	(United Kingdom) Jeremy McWilliams	Millar Racing	Yamaha	+1:49.221	5
12	(United Kingdom) Sean Emmett	Shell Team Harris	Harris Yamaha	+1 Lap	4
13	(Austria) Andreas Meklau	Austrian Racing Company	ROC Yamaha	+1 Lap	3
14	(Netherlands) Cees Doorakkers	Doorakkers Racing	Harris Yamaha	+1 Lap	2
15	(Italy) Luca Cadalora	Marlboro Team Roberts	Yamaha	+1 Lap	1
16	(New Zealand) Andrew Stroud	Team Harris	Harris Yamaha	+1 Lap	
17	(Germany) Michael Rudroff	Rallye Sport	Harris Yamaha	+1 Lap	
Ret	(France) Bernard Garcia	Yamaha Motor France	Yamaha	Retirement	
Ret	(Switzerland) Serge David	Team ROC	ROC Yamaha	Retirement	
Ret	(Japan) Tsutomu Udagawa	Team Udagawa	ROC Yamaha	Retirement	
Ret	(Belgium) Laurent Naveau	Euro Team	ROC Yamaha	Retirement	
Ret	(France) Thierry Crine	Ville de Paris	ROC Yamaha	Retirement	
Ret	(Italy) Lucio Pedercini	Team Pedercini	ROC Yamaha	Retirement	
Ret	(United Kingdom) Kevin Mitchell	MBM Racing	Harris Yamaha	Retirement	
Ret	(France) Bruno Bonhuil	MTD Objectif 500	ROC Yamaha	Retirement	
Ret	(Italy) Marco Papa	Librenti Corse	Librenti	Retirement	
Ret	(United States) Doug Chandler	Cagiva Team Agostini	Cagiva	Retirement	
Ret	(Japan) Shinichi Itoh	HRC Rothmans Honda	Honda	Retirement	
Ret	(New Zealand) Simon Crafar	Peter Graves Racing Team	Harris Yamaha	Retirement	
Ret	(Spain) Àlex Crivillé	Marlboro Honda Pons	Honda	Retirement	
DNS	(United Kingdom) John Reynolds	Padgett's Motorcycles	Harris Yamaha	Did not start	

== 250 cc classification ==
Pos	Rider	Manufacturer	Time/Retired	Points
1	(Italy) Max Biaggi	Honda	43:09.388	25
2	(Japan) Tadayuki Okada	Honda	+2.601	20
3	(Spain) Alberto Puig	Honda	+3.458	16
4	(Japan) Nobuatsu Aoki	Honda	+3.655	13
5	(France) Jean-Philippe Ruggia	Aprilia	+3.814	11
6	(Spain) Carlos Cardús	Honda	+6.489	10
7	(Spain) Luis d'Antin	Honda	+14.734	9
8	(Netherlands) Wilco Zeelenberg	Aprilia	+30.893	8
9	(Austria) Andreas Preining	Aprilia	+32.577	7
10	(New Zealand) Simon Crafar	Suzuki	+37.442	6
11	(Germany) Helmut Bradl	Honda	+42.873	5
12	(Germany) Jochen Schmid	Yamaha	+44.854	4
13	(Netherlands) Patrick van den Goorbergh	Aprilia	+50.262	3
14	(Germany) Bernd Kassner	Aprilia	+53.657	2
15	(France) Jean-Pierre Jeandat	Aprilia	+53.960	1
16	(Switzerland) Bernard Haenggeli	Aprilia	+54.089	
17	(Spain) Pere Riba	Honda	+57.620	
18	(France) Jean-Michel Bayle	Aprilia	+1:14.164	
19	(Germany) Volker Bähr	Honda	+1:35.478	
20	(Spain) Óscar Sainz	Yamaha	+2:23.918	
21	(Spain) Luis Maurel	Aprilia	+1 Lap	
22	(Italy) Massimo Pennacchioli	Honda	+1 Lap	
23	(Netherlands) Loek Bodelier	Honda	+1 Lap	
Ret	(Switzerland) Eskil Suter	Aprilia	Retirement	
Ret	(Italy) Alessandro Gramigni	Gilera	Retirement	
Ret	(Switzerland) Adrian Bosshard	Honda	Retirement	
Ret	(France) Frédéric Protat	Aprilia	Retirement	
Ret	(Spain) Alex Sirera	Yamaha	Retirement	
Ret	(Netherlands) Jurgen van den Goorbergh	Aprilia	Retirement	
Ret	(Italy) Loris Capirossi	Honda	Retirement	
Ret	(Italy) Loris Reggiani	Aprilia	Retirement	
Ret	(Italy) Pierfrancesco Chili	Yamaha	Retirement	
Ret	(Japan) Tetsuya Harada	Yamaha	Retirement	

Previous race: 1993 Dutch TT	FIM Grand Prix World Championship; 1993 season	Next race: 1993 San Marino Grand Prix
Previous race: 1992 European Grand Prix	European Grand Prix	Next race: 1994 European Grand Prix
