= Loris Capirossi =

Italian motorcycle racer

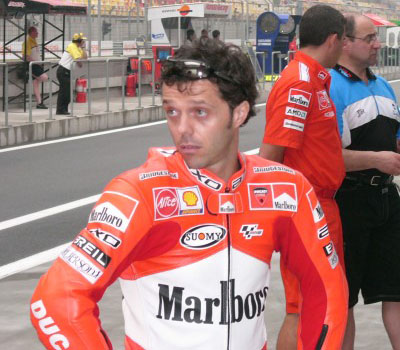
- Capirossi in 2005
- Nationality: Italian
- Born: 4 April 1973 (age 53); Castel San Pietro Terme, Italy
Motorcycle racing career statistics
MotoGP World Championship
Active years	1995–1996, 2000–2011
Manufacturers	Honda (1995, 2000–2002); Yamaha (1996); Ducati (2003–2007, 2011); Suzuki (2008–2010)
Championships	0
2011 championship position	17th (43 pts)
Starts / Wins / Podiums / Poles / F. laps / Points; 217 / 9 / 42 / 13 / 10 / 1840
250cc World Championship
Active years	1992–1994, 1997–1999
Manufacturers	Honda (1992–1994, 1999); Aprilia (1997–1998)
Championships	1 (1998)
1999 championship position	3rd (209 pts)
Starts / Wins / Podiums / Poles / F. laps / Points; 84 / 12 / 37 / 23 / 18 / 968
125cc World Championship
Active years	1990–1991
Manufacturers	Honda
Championships	2 (1990, 1991)
1991 championship position	1st (200 pts)
Starts / Wins / Podiums / Poles / F. laps / Points; 27 / 8 / 20 / 5 / 4 / 382
Grand Prix motorcycle racing
Active years	1990–2011
First race	1990 125cc Japanese Grand Prix
Last race	2011 MotoGP Valencian Grand Prix
First win	1990 125cc British Grand Prix
Last win	2007 MotoGP Japanese Grand Prix
Championships	3; 125cc: 1990, 1991; 250cc: 1998
Starts / Wins / Podiums / Poles / F. laps / Points; 328 / 29 / 99 / 41 / 32 / 3190

Loris Capirossi (born 4 April 1973) is an Italian former Grand Prix motorcycle road racer, currently serving as Safety Advisor to Dorna Sports, the commercial rights holder of Grand Prix motorcycle racing.

Capirossi is a nine-time Premier Class race winner, competing between 1990 and 2011. He was the first Grand Prix rider to start at least 300 races, having made his 300th start at the 2010 season-opener Qatar Grand Prix. Capirossi is the 1990 and 1991 125cc World Champion, the 1998 250cc World Champion, while also holding the honor of Youngest World Champion in motorcycle racing, winning the 1990 125cc title at 17 years and 165 days old.

== Career ==
=== 125cc World Championship ===
Capirossi made his World Championship debut at 125 cc level in 1990 with the Polini Honda team operated by former world champion Paolo Pileri. He finished in the top six on ten occasions, eight of them on the podium, and took wins in Britain, Hungary and Australia. The massed Italian contingent helped him out by boxing in and thwarting his closest rival Hans Spaan of the Netherlands in the final round, to end a controversial season. In his first full season of Grand Prix racing, Capirossi took his first world championship aged only seventeen years, 5 months and 13 days.

Capirossi's second season (1991) was even better, and saw him defend the 125cc title comfortably. He was only once off the front row of the grid, and had five pole positions, as well as four fastest laps. From thirteen rounds, he was on the podium for twelve, and finished sixth in Austria. He came second five times, and was a winner in Australia, Malaysia, and three European venues. His 225 points, 200 of them counted, were enough to help him move up to the 250cc class. During this second season, Capirosssi and his team were sponsored by AGV Helmets and AGV Sport leathers.

=== 250cc World Championship ===
Capirossi moved up to 250 cc class for the 1992 season on a year-old bike. In 1993 Capirossi made his first win at Netherlands and added another two in San Marino and United States, but finished second and only four points behind Harada. It was the same in 1994, this time with one more win. He finished third at the end of the season behind Max Biaggi and Tadayuki Okada.

=== 500cc World Championship ===
The 1995 season was Capirossi's first season in the top-level 500 cc championship. He was aboard a Pileri Honda, and although he often qualified better than he raced, he still took sixth in the championship. In 1996, Capirossi retired from five of the first seven races, but thereafter he was often in the points and won the final race in Australia riding for Wayne Rainey's Yamaha team.

=== Return to 250cc ===
Capirossi returned to the 250 cc championship for 1997. While he finished in sixth in his first year with the team, he was much more competitive in the 1998 season. He battled his Aprilia teammate, Tetsuya Harada, for the championship down to the Argentine Grand Prix when the two riders were involved in a controversial incident in Argentina. Harada was leading his teammate for second place behind Valentino Rossi into the final corner of the final lap when Harada's bike was rammed from behind by Capirossi's machine, sending the Japanese rider off the track. Rossi took the victory whilst Capirossi recovered to claim second place and the world championship (following an appeal). Aprilia would release him during the off-season.

Capirossi moved to Honda for the 1999 season, taking third in the championship with three victories. He was involved in further controversy in the 1999 season, being black flagged at Mugello for dangerous riding after being involved in an incident with Marcellino Lucchi at the start of the race, as well as passing under yellow flags.

=== Return to 500cc & MotoGP World Championship ===
Capirossi returned to the 500 cc championship for 2000, and remained there through its evolution to the 990 cc and eventually, 800 cc four-stroke MotoGP era. He won at his home race and finished 7th overall, one point behind Carlos Checa. The 2001 season was better than the year before, although without a win during the year. It was also the last season for the 500 cc class, but for the 2002 season, Capirossi found that he would ride inferior bikes from 2001. It was a less competitive year, hampered by a wrist injury in the seventh race of the season when he missed the chicane and turned from the track. As he was not given access to Honda's four-stroke machine in late 2002 when teammate Alex Barros was, he was the highest-ranking rider in the 2002 season standings to use a two-stroke machine all year.

In 2003, Capirossi joined Ducati, taking their first win at Barcelona and fourth overall in the championship, before a slightly disappointing 2004 season on a bike with huge straight line speed but a lack of grip. He stayed in the team for the 2005 season, which saw him become competitive by the end of the year, taking two victories in Japan and Malaysia, aided by improving Bridgestone tyres.

Capirossi and Ducati started the 2006 season with a striking victory at Jerez, and he placed second in both the French and Italian Grands Prix, tying for first in the Moto GP standings with American Nicky Hayden. However, he was caught up in a multiple bike collision at the start in Barcelona, missing the restart and losing championship ground to Hayden. Though he was knocked out in this horrendous looking accident, he did not suffer serious injuries beyond significant bruising. He returned for the next round, but a run of less competitive results saw him slip to fifth in the standings before the race at Brno. He started second, took the lead at the start, and pulled away from the field for an easy victory. He attributed this to a late setup change that the team believed could be applied to the bike at all circuits. He moved up in the championship standings to finish third overall, after taking second at the final race behind stand-in teammate Troy Bayliss.

2007 was not as strong a season for Capirossi. Immediately following the conclusion of the United States Grand Prix at Mazda Raceway Laguna Seca, Ducati announced the signing of Marco Melandri and the extension of Casey Stoner's contract for the 2008 and 2009 seasons. This left Capirossi without a firm position on the Marlboro Ducati team; the possibilities were mooted to be a third position on the factory team, or an option to manage a satellite team. Capirossi was not informed of the decision before the story was released to the press, much to his displeasure.

On 16 August 2007, Capirossi announced that he would ride with the Suzuki factory team in the 2008 and 2009 seasons, alongside Australian Chris Vermeulen.

2008 was a less competitive season due to many weak results during the season. The only podium Capirossi had was in Czech Republic at Brno. In Spain, Capirossi was injured and missed two races. He finished the season in tenth place, his lowest position since 1996. In 2009, his season started with a crash in Qatar when he was in second place. In Italy, Capirossi fought with Stoner for first place but fell to fifth due to his slower Suzuki on the main straight. He finished the season in ninth place without a podium for the first time since 1992. On 11 April 2010, Capirossi became the first rider in the history of the sport to start 300 races, when he finished ninth in the season-opening Qatar Grand Prix. The rest of his campaign was plagued by retirements and injury. For 2011 Capirossi announced that he would ride for the Ducati Pramac Team.

On 11 June 2010, Capirossi rode a Suzuki around the Snaefell Mountain Course on the Isle of Man as part of Suzuki's 50th anniversary at the Isle of Man TT. On completion of his lap, Capirossi described the experience as 'amazing'.

On 1 September 2011, Capirossi announced that he would retire from MotoGP racing, at the end of the 2011 season.

After his retirement, Capirossi's race number, the #65, is unofficially retired from the MotoGP class. On 7 November 2016, during the weeks leading to the 2016 Valencia GP, it was announced that his number had been retired from all classes of Grand Prix motorcycle racing. However, it may be an official retirement of the #65 in the MotoGP class only, as two days later, during the release of the entry list of the 2017 Moto3 season, Moto3 rider Philipp Öttl was listed still using the #65, a number that Öttl had used for his entire career so far.

== Personal life ==
Capirossi married Ingrid Tence in August of 2002 and currently the couple resides in Monaco. Their first child, Riccardo Capirossi, was born on 2 April 2007.

In August 2007, the Italian taxation authority announced that Capirossi was under investigation for suspected tax evasion in relation to alleged undeclared earnings of €1.3 million (US$1.77 million) in 2002. The authority also investigated London resident Valentino Rossi. Capirossi's manager Carlo Pernat told the press: "It's absolutely absurd. Loris really lives in Monte Carlo. I don't understand what they can hold against him. He doesn't own anything in Italy."

Capirossi is a member of the 'Champions for Peace' club, a group of more than 90 athletes created by Peace and Sport, a Monaco-based international organization placed under the High Patronage of H.S.H Prince Albert II. The group's stated aim is to make sport a tool for dialogue and social cohesion.

== Books and movies ==
Capirossi's biography was published in 2017 by the publisher company Sperling & Kupfer under the title "65 – la mia vita senza paura (65 – my life without fear)". The book was written with the Italian writer Simone Sarasso and was published in Italy only.

Several key moments of Capirossi's career are also described in the book "Belìn che paddock" by MotoGP manager Carlo Pernat, who managed Capirossi for several years.

Capirossi's first year in the 125 GP Italian championship is told by himself and his former mechanic Guido Mancini in the first part of the documentary film Mancini, the Motorcycle Wizard, by director Jeffrey Zani. Capirossi was also interviewed for the MotoGP documentary Faster by Mark Neale.

== Career statistics ==
=== Grand Prix motorcycle racing ===
==== By season ====
Season	Class	Motorcycle	Team	Number	Race	Win	Podium	Pole	FLap	Pts	Plcd	WCh
1990	125cc	Honda RS125	Polini Honda	65	14	3	8	0	0	182	**1st**	1
1991	125cc	Honda RS125	Polini Honda	1	13	5	12	5	4	200	**1st**	1
1992	250cc	Honda NSR250	Marlboro Honda	6	13	0	0	0	0	27	12th	–
1993	250cc	Honda NSR250	Marlboro Honda	65	14	3	7	7	5	193	**2nd**	–
1994	250cc	Honda NSR250	Marlboro Honda	2	14	4	9	5	5	199	**3rd**	–
1995	500cc	Honda NSR500	Team Pileri	65	12	0	1	0	0	108	6th	–
1996	500cc	Yamaha YZR500	Rainey-Yamaha	65	15	1	2	0	0	98	10th	–
1997	250cc	Aprilia RS250	Aprilia Racing Team	65	14	0	3	1	2	116	6th	–
1998	250cc	Aprilia RS250	Aprilia Racing Team	65	14	2	9	8	3	224	**1st**	1
1999	250cc	Honda NSR250	Elf Axo Honda Gresini	1	15	3	9	2	3	209	**3rd**	–
2000	500cc	Honda NSR500	Emerson Honda Pons	65	16	1	4	1	1	154	7th	–
2001	500cc	Honda NSR500	West Honda Pons	65	16	0	9	4	1	210	**3rd**	–
2002	MotoGP	Honda NSR500	West Honda Pons	65	14	0	2	0	0	109	8th	–
2003	MotoGP	Ducati GP3	Ducati Marlboro Team	65	16	1	6	3	1	177	4th	–
2004	MotoGP	Ducati GP4	Ducati Marlboro Team	65	16	0	1	0	1	117	9th	–
2005	MotoGP	Ducati GP5	Ducati Marlboro Team	65	15	2	4	3	1	157	6th	–
2006	MotoGP	Ducati GP6	Ducati Marlboro Team	65	17	3	8	2	5	229	**3rd**	–
2007	MotoGP	Ducati GP7	Ducati Marlboro Team	65	18	1	4	0	0	166	7th	–
2008	MotoGP	Suzuki GSV-R	Rizla Suzuki MotoGP	65	16	0	1	0	0	118	10th	–
2009	MotoGP	Suzuki GSV-R	Rizla Suzuki MotoGP	65	17	0	0	0	0	110	9th	–
2010	MotoGP	Suzuki GSV-R	Rizla Suzuki MotoGP	65	16	0	0	0	0	44	16th	–
2011	MotoGP	Ducati GP11	Pramac Racing Team	65, 58	13	0	0	0	0	43	17th	–
Total					**328**	**29**	**99**	**41**	**32**	**3190**		**3**

==== By class ====
Class	Seasons	1st GP	1st Pod	1st Win	Race	Win	Podiums	Pole	FLap	Pts	WChmp
125cc	1990–1991	1990 Japan	1990 Nations	1990 Great Britain	27	8	20	5	4	382	2
250cc	1992–1994, 1997–1999	1992 Japan	1993 Austria	1993 Netherlands	84	12	37	23	18	968	1
500cc	1995–1996, 2000–2001	1995 Australia	1995 Catalunya	1996 Australia	59	2	16	5	2	570	0
MotoGP	2002–2011	2002 Japan	2002 South Africa	2003 Catalunya	158	7	26	8	8	1270	0
Total	1990–2011				**328**	**29**	**99**	**41**	**32**	**3190**	**3**

==== Races by year ====
(key) (Races in bold indicate pole position, races in italics indicate fastest lap)

Year	Class	Bike	1	2	3	4	5	6	7	8	9	10	11	12	13	14	15	16	17	18	Pos.	Pts
1990	125cc	Honda	JPN; 6	SPA; 7	NAT; 3	GER; 3	AUT; 2	YUG; 2	NED; Ret	BEL; 2	FRA; 4	GBR; 1	SWE; 7	CZE; Ret	HUN; 1	AUS; 1					**1st**	**182**
1991	125cc	Honda	JPN; 3	**AUS**; 1	SPA; 3	ITA; 2	**GER**; 2	AUT; 6	EUR; 1	**NED**; 2	FRA; 1	**GBR**; 1	RSM; 2	**CZE**; 2	MAL; 1						**1st**	**200**
1992	250cc	Honda	JPN; 9	AUS; Ret	MAL; 9	SPA; 11	ITA; 9	EUR; Ret	GER; 9	NED; 8	HUN; Ret	FRA; Ret	GBR; 7	BRA; 7	RSA; 5						12th	27
1993	250cc	Honda	**AUS**; Ret	**MAL**; 12	JPN; 10	SPA; 10	AUT; 2	GER; 2	**NED**; 1	EUR; Ret	RSM; 1	**GBR**; 2	**CZE**; 5	ITA; 2	**USA**; 1	**FIM**; 5					**2nd**	**193**
1994	250cc	Honda	**AUS**; 3	MAL; 3	JPN; 2	**SPA**; Ret	AUT; 1	**GER**; 1	NED; Ret	ITA; 3	FRA; 1	**GBR**; 1	CZE; Ret	USA; Ret	**ARG**; 5	EUR; 2					**3rd**	**199**
1995	500cc	Honda	AUS; 8	MAL; Ret	JPN; Ret	SPA; 6	GER; 6	ITA; 9	NED; 4	FRA; DNS	GBR; 4	CZE; 4	BRA; 9	ARG; 5	EUR; 3						6th	108
1996	500cc	Yamaha	MAL; Ret	INA; 3	JPN; Ret	SPA; 4	ITA; Ret	FRA; Ret	NED; Ret	GER; 12	GBR; 6	AUT; 8	CZE; 5	IMO; Ret	CAT; 9	BRA; 12	AUS; 1				10th	98
1997	250cc	Aprilia	MAL; Ret	JPN; 11	SPA; Ret	ITA; 3	AUT; 4	FRA; 4	NED; 3	IMO; Ret	GER; 5	BRA; 4	**GBR**; 3	CZE; Ret	CAT; 5	INA; 14	AUS; DNS				6th	116
1998	250cc	Aprilia	JPN; 9	MAL; 5	**SPA**; 1	ITA; 4	FRA; 3	**MAD**; 3	**NED**; Ret	**GBR**; 1	GER; 4	**CZE**; 2	IMO; 2	**CAT**; 3	**AUS**; 2	**ARG**; 2					**1st**	**224**
1999	250cc	Honda	MAL; 1	JPN; 3	SPA; 3	FRA; Ret	ITA; DSQ	CAT	NED; 1	**GBR**; 2	GER; 2	CZE; 7	IMO; 1	VAL; 3	AUS; 6	**RSA**; 5	BRA; 3	ARG; Ret			**3rd**	**209**
2000	500cc	Honda	RSA; 3	MAL; Ret	JPN; 12	SPA; 6	FRA; 8	ITA; 1	CAT; 6	**NED**; 3	GBR; 4	GER; 6	CZE; 5	POR; 13	VAL; Ret	BRA; Ret	PAC; 8	AUS; 2			7th	154
2001	500cc	Honda	**JPN**; 8	RSA; 2	SPA; 8	FRA; 7	ITA; 2	CAT; 3	**NED**; 3	GBR; 10	GER; 8	CZE; 3	POR; 2	VAL; Ret	**PAC**; 3	AUS; 3	**MAL**; 2	BRA; 5			**3rd**	**210**
2002	MotoGP	Honda	JPN; 9	RSA; 3	SPA; 4	FRA; 7	ITA; 6	CAT; 6	NED; Ret	GBR	GER	CZE; 6	POR; Ret	BRA; 5	PAC; 3	MAL; 9	AUS; Ret	VAL; Ret			8th	109
2003	MotoGP	Ducati	JPN; 3	RSA; Ret	**SPA**; Ret	FRA; Ret	ITA; 2	CAT; 1	**NED**; 6	GBR; 4	GER; 4	CZE; Ret	**POR**; 3	BRA; 6	PAC; 8	MAL; 6	AUS; 2	VAL; 3			4th	177
2004	MotoGP	Ducati	RSA; 6	SPA; 12	FRA; 10	ITA; 8	CAT; 10	NED; 8	BRA; 4	GER; Ret	GBR; 7	CZE; 5	POR; 7	JPN; Ret	QAT; Ret	MAL; 6	AUS; 3	VAL; 9			9th	117
2005	MotoGP	Ducati	SPA; 13	POR; 9	CHN; 12	FRA; 7	ITA; 3	CAT; 12	NED; 10	USA; 10	GBR; 6	GER; 9	CZE; 2	**JPN**; 1	**MAL**; 1	**QAT**; 10	AUS	TUR	VAL; 7		6th	157
2006	MotoGP	Ducati	**SPA**; 1	QAT; 3	TUR; 6	CHN; 8	FRA; 2	ITA; 2	CAT; Ret	NED; 15	GBR; 9	GER; 5	USA; 8	CZE; 1	MAL; 2	AUS; 7	**JPN**; 1	POR; 12	VAL; 2		**3rd**	**229**
2007	MotoGP	Ducati	QAT; Ret	SPA; 12	TUR; 3	CHN; 6	FRA; 8	ITA; 7	CAT; 6	GBR; Ret	NED; Ret	GER; 2	USA; Ret	CZE; 6	RSM; 5	POR; 9	JPN; 1	AUS; 2	MAL; 11	VAL; 5	7th	166
2008	MotoGP	Suzuki	QAT; 8	SPA; 5	POR; 9	CHN; 9	FRA; 7	ITA; 7	CAT; Ret	GBR	NED; WD	GER; 7	USA; 15	CZE; 3	RSM; 7	INP; 16	JPN; 6	AUS; 10	MAL; 7	VAL; 9	10th	118
2009	MotoGP	Suzuki	QAT; Ret	JPN; 7	SPA; 6	FRA; 8	ITA; 5	CAT; 5	NED; 9	USA; Ret	GER; 11	GBR; 11	CZE; 5	INP; 7	RSM; 5	POR; Ret	AUS; 12	MAL; 9	VAL; 14		9th	110
2010	MotoGP	Suzuki	QAT; 9	SPA; Ret	FRA; Ret	ITA; 10	GBR; Ret	NED; 13	CAT; 7	GER; 11	USA; 10	CZE; Ret	INP; 11	RSM; Ret	ARA	JPN; Ret	MAL; Ret	AUS; DNS	POR; 13	VAL; Ret	16th	44
2011	MotoGP	Ducati	QAT; Ret	SPA; 11	POR; 12	FRA; Ret	CAT; 9	GBR; 10	NED; DNS	ITA	GER	USA; 12	CZE; 13	INP; Ret	RSM; Ret	ARA; Ret	JPN	AUS; 9	MAL; C	VAL; 9	17th	43
