= Ducati Desmosedici =

Racing motorcycle

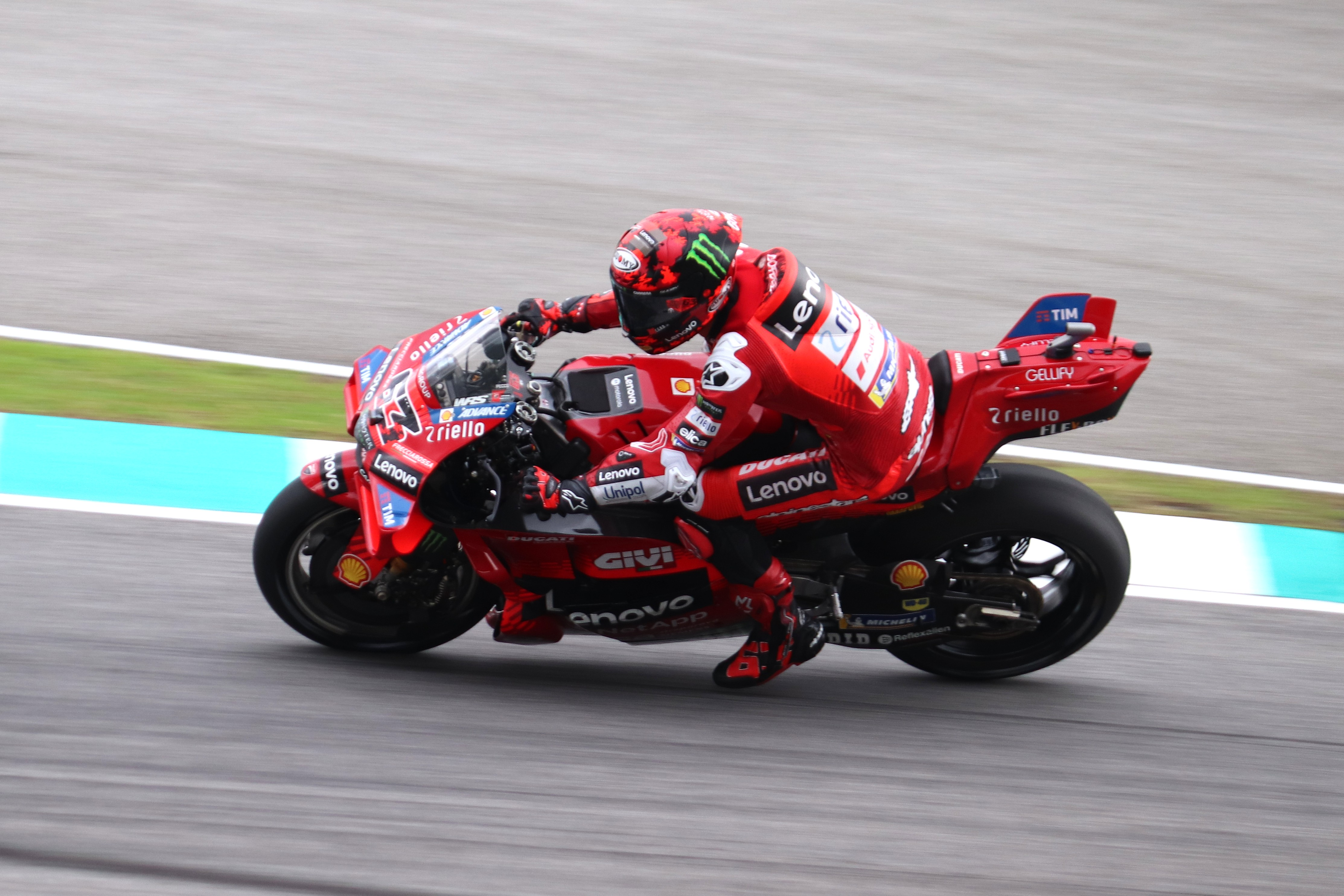
- Francesco Bagnaia, riding a Ducati Desmosedici, at Sepang (2025)
- Manufacturer: Ducati
- Also called: Ducati D16
- Production: Since 2003
- Class: MotoGP racing
- Engine: 1,000 cc (61 cu in) four-stroke 90° V4
- Transmission: 6-speed, chain
- Fuel capacity: 22 L (4.8 imp gal; 5.8 US gal)

The Ducati Desmosedici is a four-stroke V4 engine racing motorcycle made by Ducati for MotoGP racing. The series nomenclature is GP with the two-digit year appended, such as Desmosedici GP10 for 2010. In 2006 Ducati made a short production run of 1,500 street-legal variants, the Desmosedici RR.

== Background ==
Ducati abandoned the Grand Prix racing scene at the start of the 1970s. For many years, the 500 class was essentially a class for two-stroke motorcycles, an engineering technology that was far removed from the four-stroke road-going machines sold by Ducati. Technical rules changed in 2002, giving priority to four-stroke machinery and turning the 500 class of World Road Racing into the MotoGP Championship. This convinced Ducati to make a much-awaited return to the track in the new MotoGP class.

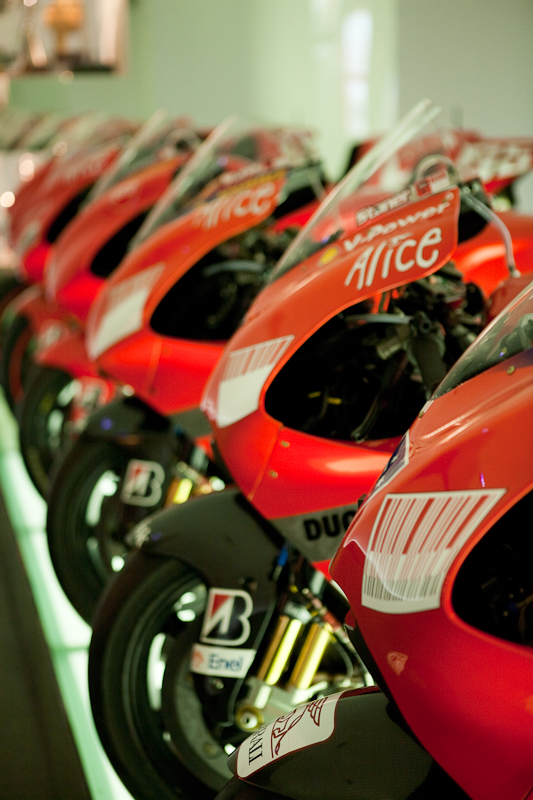
Desmosedici chronology at the Ducati Museum

Ducati history is classically based on 90° V-twin (or L-twin) engines, using desmodromic valve technology. Initially, Ducati considered the possibility of creating a MotoGP 'super-twin', taking advantage of the MotoGP regulations that give twin-cylinder machines a considerable weight reduction over four, five, or six-cylinder bikes. However, the analysis indicated that a twin-cylinder engine would not have been able to produce the required power without excessively increasing the revs. A twin would have had to rev at over 17,000 rpm, but this would require a very short stroke and a very large bore, as a result producing possible combustion problems.

The basis of the Desmosedici engine design is a V4 configuration: essentially two classic V-twins mounted side by side, with two-cylinder stroking at the same time (also called Twin Pulse). With four valves per cylinder, the total number of valves is sixteen – Desmosedici means desmodromic distribution with sixteen valves shortened in Italian.

Design work started in 2001, and the bike was unveiled at the 2002 Italian GP at Mugello for use in the following seasons of the MotoGP World Championship. Vittoriano Guareschi, the Ducati Corse test-rider, followed every phase of the Desmosedici's development process from early testing to track debut and the project's evolution. In 2007, Ducati's pilot Casey Stoner, riding a Desmosedici, obtained Ducati's first MotoGP World Championship title.

In early 2021, Ducati rider Johann Zarco set the highest trap speed record in competition practice on the Desmosedici.

=== GP3 ===
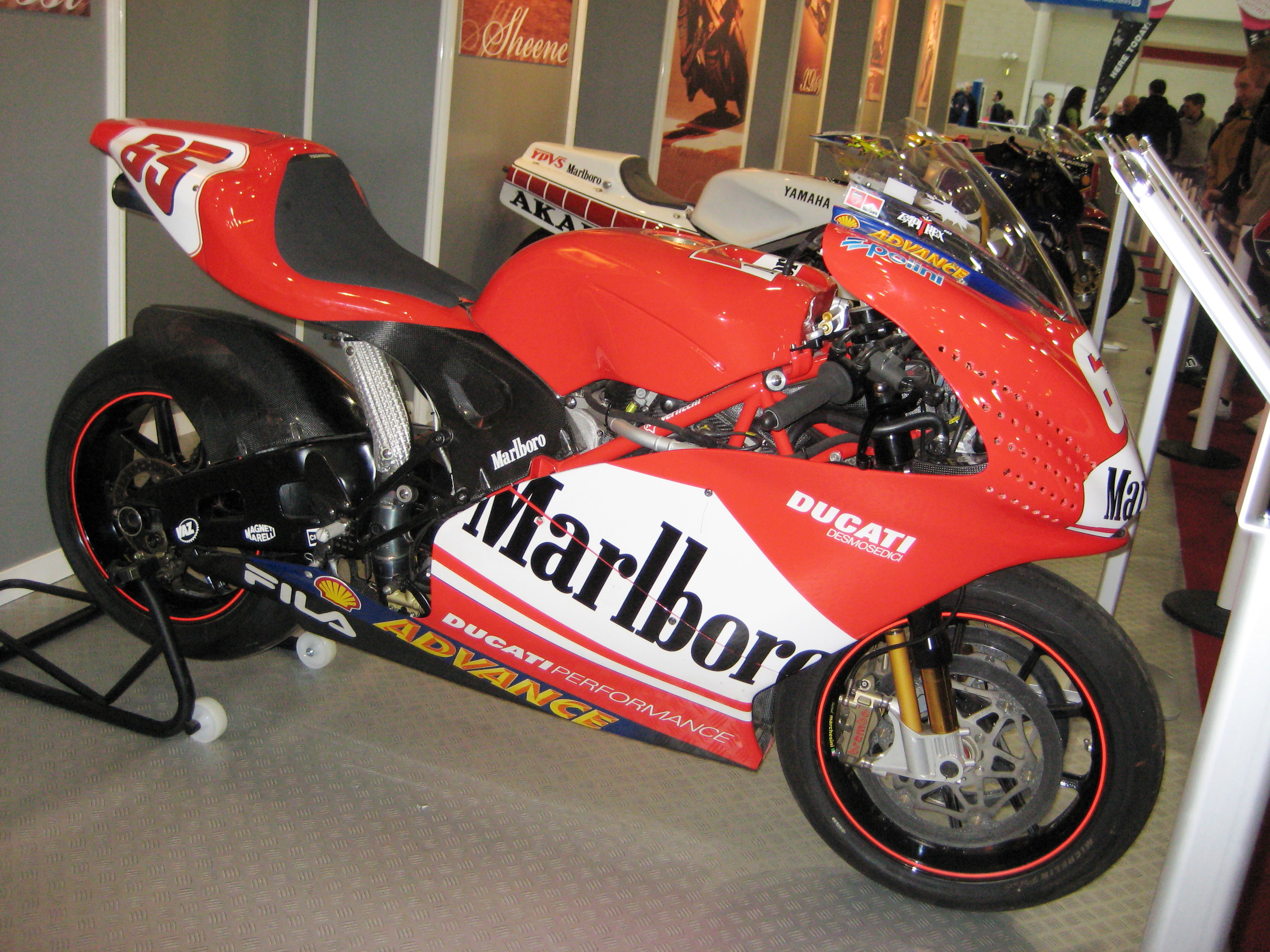
Ducati Desmosedici GP3

While still fully committed to Superbike racing, the Ducati Marlboro Team of Loris Capirossi and Troy Bayliss would compete in all rounds of the 2003 MotoGP championship. The Desmosedici GP3 quickly scored a series of results with Loris Capirossi, who stepped onto the podium in the opening round of the championship in Japan and won the GP Catalunya in Barcelona. Riders Capirossi finished fourth in the final championship standings and Bayliss sixth, while Ducati finished second overall in the Manufacturers' standings.

=== GP4 ===
In 2004, the Desmosedici GP4, again in the hands of Capirossi and Bayliss, underwent a series of major modifications. A large part of the season passed before the bike became competitive, but the season ended with both riders on the podium.

=== GP5 ===
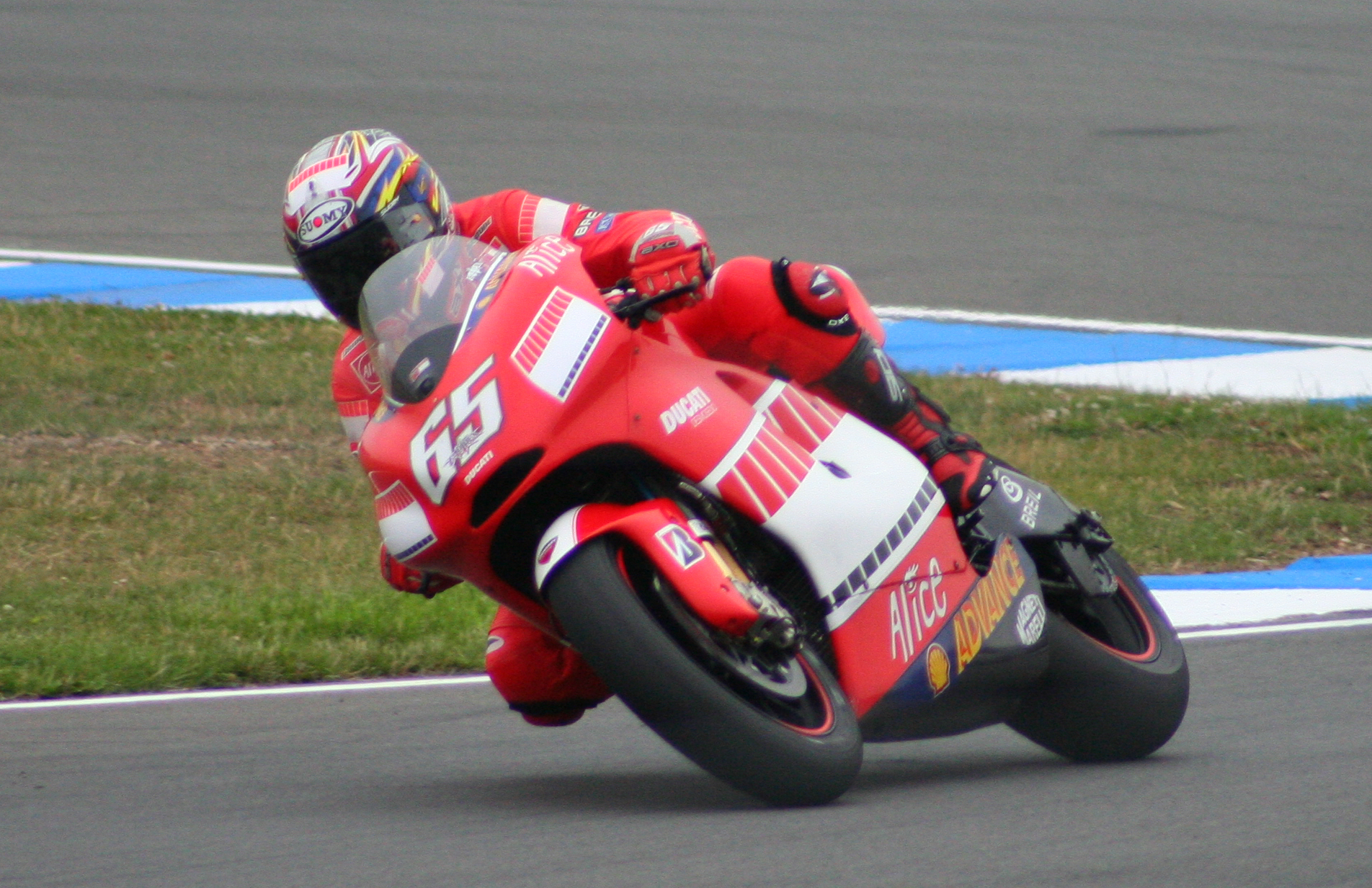
Loris Capirossi riding the GP5

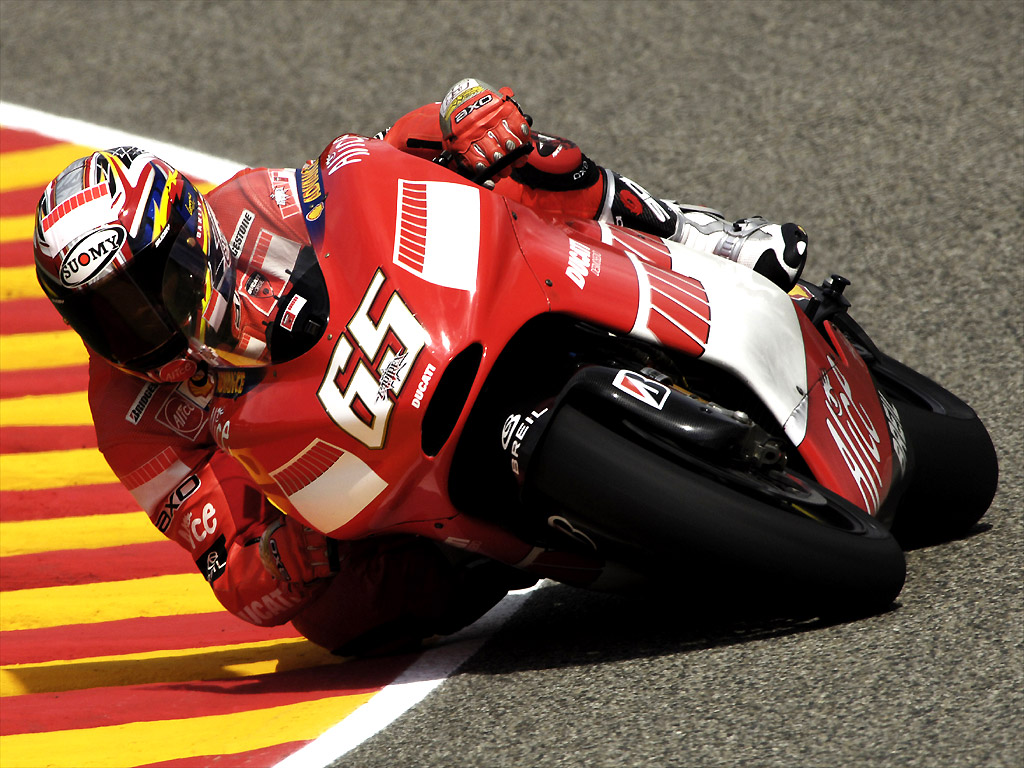
Loris Capirossi riding the GP6

The GP5 version lined up for Ducati's third season in MotoGP, with Bayliss replaced by the Spanish rider Carlos Checa. Thanks to a collaboration agreement with Bridgestone, Ducati could finally contribute to the development of new tyres and by the end of the season the Desmosedici became a competitive machine. Bridgestone found that hard tyres suited the bike more than softer tyres to create grip, allowing it to spin the rear wheel gave better control. Capirossi took two wins in the Grand Prix of Japan at Motegi and in the Malaysian GP at Sepang, while Checa scored a brace of podium finishes.

=== GP6 ===
Launched at the Italian skiing resort of Madonna di Campiglio, the GP6 is a lighter and more powerful version of the GP5. Involving better aerodynamics and a better fuel tank position, most importantly, although more powerful, the engine delivery was smoothened to make the bike more rideable. This made the bike slower on top speed, but quicker into, around and out of corners.

The new rider with Capirossi was Spanish rider Sete Gibernau. After encouraging winter tests, the Desmosedici GP6 took its first win of 2006 in the opening GP at Jerez de la Frontera, Spain, followed by a podium in Qatar. Capirossi led the championship for a short while, but at the start of the Grand prix de Catalunya at Barcelona, Gibernau's bike collided with Capirossi's after Gibernau braked too late and compressed his brake lever further after impacting it on the back of Capirossi's bike. Both riders ended up injured and in the hospital, with Gibernau sustaining a broken collar bone, and both missed the Dutch Grand Prix at Assen. Capirossi returned at the British Grand Prix, while Gibernau was replaced by German Alex Hofmann for the Dutch Grand Prix, the British Grand Prix, and also the Czech Grand Prix after undergoing additional surgery. With Gibernau sidelined for the final round of the season at Valencia following a collision with Casey Stoner, Ducati recalled Bayliss, who was recently crowned World Superbike champion. The race was won by Bayliss, his first MotoGP victory, with Capirossi taking second place for the first Ducati 1–2 finish.

=== GP7 ===
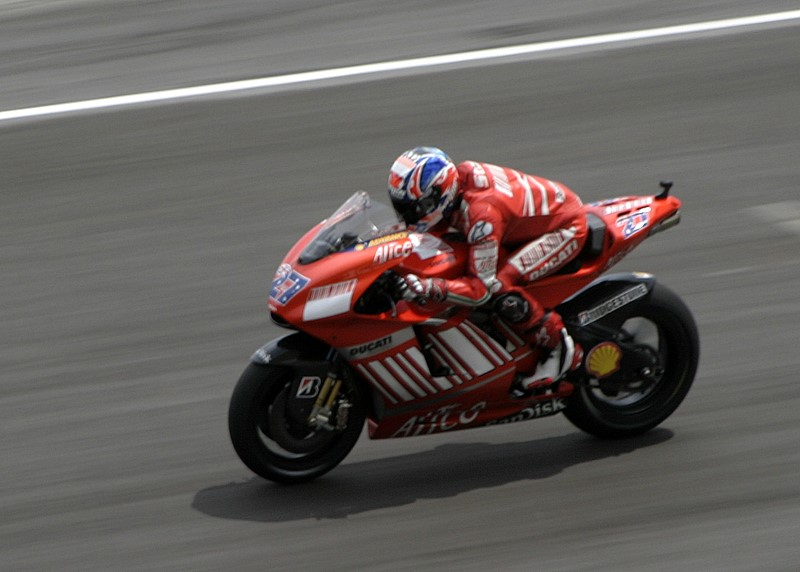
Casey Stoner's Ducati Desmosedici GP7

For 2007, MotoGP rules were changed to cap motors to a maximum displacement of 800 cc. In response, Ducati built the GP7. Its specifications were: 800 cc bike, double L-Twin motor (4 Cylinder Twin Pulse).

Ducati started its project to build an 800 cc MotoGP bike extremely early and according to Ducati's racing chief Filippo Preziosi, by August 2006 Ducati had already built twenty 800 cc engines with various specifications. In addition, an early version of the bike was track tested for the first time during early May 2006. Public testing with the bike began at the Brno Track, where Loris Capirossi had won the day before riding the GP6, on the 21st of August. Capirossi's lap times on the prototype GP7 were only 1.4 seconds off his track record time set on the 990 cc GP6.

Further testing of the GP7 in Motegi, Japan, revealed that the 800 cc machine could run faster laps than the higher-displacement 990 cc bikes, and held nearly a second advantage over the next fastest 800 cc bike, a Honda ridden by Dani Pedrosa.

MotoGP's 800 cc era officially began with the first race of the 2007 MotoGP season, at the Losail International Circuit in Qatar. Casey Stoner won the race on the new GP7. The bike had a clear top speed advantage over the rest of the grid, due to its higher output motor. A new track record was set on the GP7. Second place contender and five time World champion, Yamaha's Valentino Rossi, realised that "unfortunately, there was too much difference between (our) bikes in the straight" and "Our Yamaha will never go as quick on a straight as the Ducati." These words turned out to be true, as the GP7 enjoyed a top speed advantage throughout the season, although the other manufacturers (Yamaha, Honda, Kawasaki, and Suzuki) closed the gap significantly by the end of the year. Stoner and his Bridgestone-shod Ducati proved to be the top combination in MotoGP and he won the world championship at Motegi, Japan, on September 23, 2007, four races before the end of the season.

=== GP8 ===
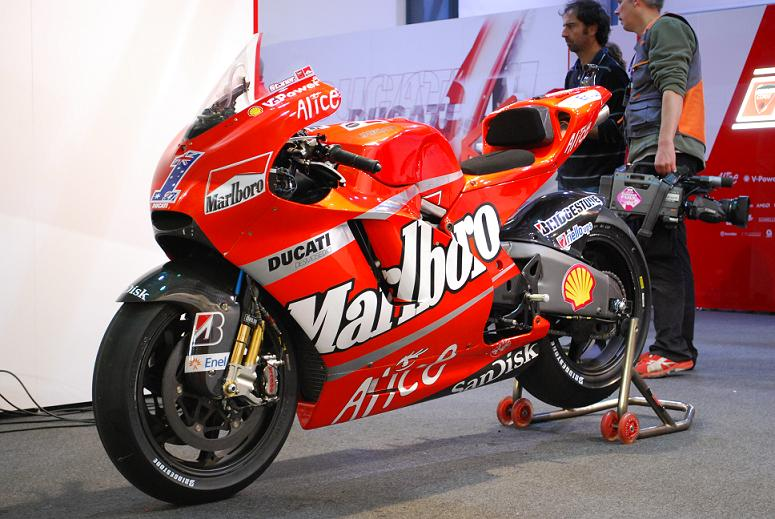
Casey Stoner's Ducati Desmosedici GP8

An update of the GP7 design, Ducati's entry for the 2008 MotoGP World Championship was tested first in February 2007.

For purposes of avoiding chatter which was encountered on some occasions with GP7, the rigidity of the GP8's frame was altered, although further details of relevant modifications are not disclosed. In addition, in an attempt to reduce an effect described as "pumping", some modifications to the bike's suspension geometry were made.

As with its predecessor the GP8 contains a four-cylinder 800 cc engine with desmodromic actuation of its 16 valves. The engine has improved mid-range response and top-end power compared to that of the GP7.

Throughout 2007, Ducati tested a special fuel-saving clutch arrangement which disengaged the clutch during braking and reduced fuel consumption, however the arrangement was not incorporated in the GP8 as various advanced lubricants and fuels used with the GP8 are believed to provide comparable fuel savings, while decreasing internal engine friction and increasing maximum power.

In race trim, the bike recorded an official top speed of 343.2 km/h (213.3 mph) at the 2008 Chinese motorcycle Grand Prix.

=== GP9 ===
The GP9 was Ducati's entry for the 2009 MotoGP World Championship. Ducati began testing it on track prior to May 2008. On 9 June 2008, Ducati publicly rolled out the Desmosedici GP9 for testing at Circuit de Catalunya.

A distinctive feature of GP9 is its carbon fibre chassis, representing a departure from Ducati's traditional steel trellis chassis. Although carbon fibre chassis were tried in mid 1980s, currently no other MotoGP racing team uses them.

=== GP10 ===
On January 15, 2010, Ducati introduced the GP10 for the 2010 MotoGP season. Development concentrated on improving engine longevity, to keep within new engine restrictions, and rideability. Most notably, the GP10 makes use of a big-bang firing order for the first time since the Desmosedici changed from the 990 cc to the 800 cc engine capacity. Ducati also redesigned the fairing, first seen at the 2009 Estoril round.

=== GP11 ===
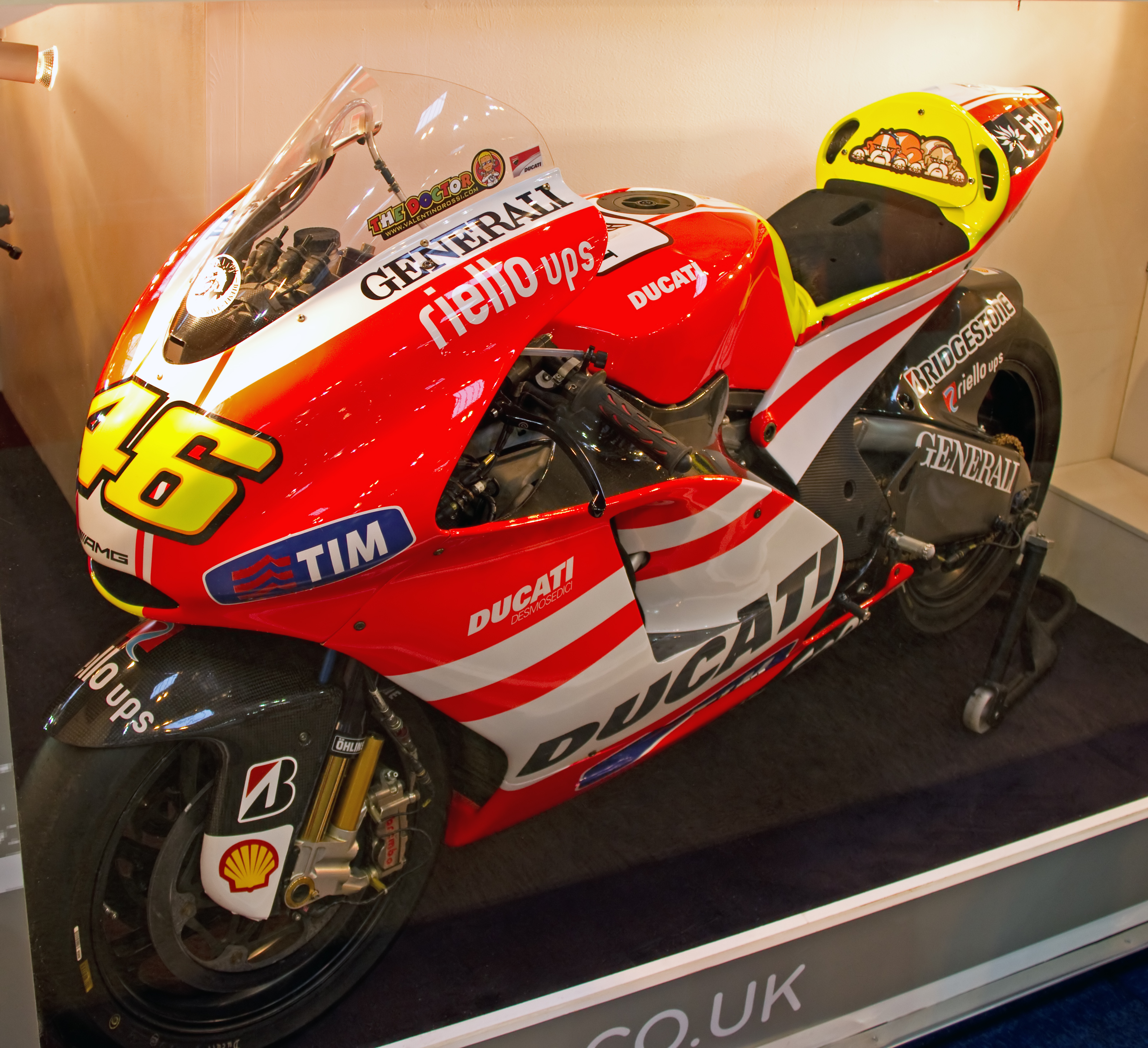
Valentino Rossi's Ducati Desmosedici GP11

On January 12, 2011, Ducati introduced the GP11 for the 2011 MotoGP season. The bike was raced by Valentino Rossi and Nicky Hayden.

Ducati Desmosedici GP11 Specifications
Engine
Engine type:	Liquid-cooled, 90-degree, V4 4-stroke with 16-valve, Desmodromic DOHC
Displacement:	800 cc
Bore x stroke	81mm x 38.7mm
Ignition:	Magneti Marelli
Carburation	Indirect Magneti Marelli electronic injection, four throttle bodies with injectors above butterfly valves. Throttles operated by EVO TCF (Throttle control & Feedback) system
Maximum power:	>200 hp
Maximum speed:	
Exhaust	Termignoni
Transmission
Type:	6-speed cassette-type gearbox, with alternative gear ratios available
Primary drive:	Gear
Clutch:	Dry multi-plate slipper clutch
Final drive:	Regina Chain
Chassis and running gear
Frame type:	Carbon fiber chassis
Front suspension:	Öhlins inverted 48 mm front forks
Rear suspension:	Öhlins rear shock absorber, adjuster for pre-load, compression and rebound damping
Front/rear wheels:	16.5 inch front and rear
Front/rear tyres:	Bridgestone
Front brake:	Brembo, two 320 mm carbon front discs with four-piston calipers
Rear Brake:	Brembo, single stainless steel rear disc with two-piston calipers
Dry Weight:	150 kg (330 lb.)
Fuel capacity:	21 L (4.6 imp gal; 5.5 US gal)

=== GP12 ===
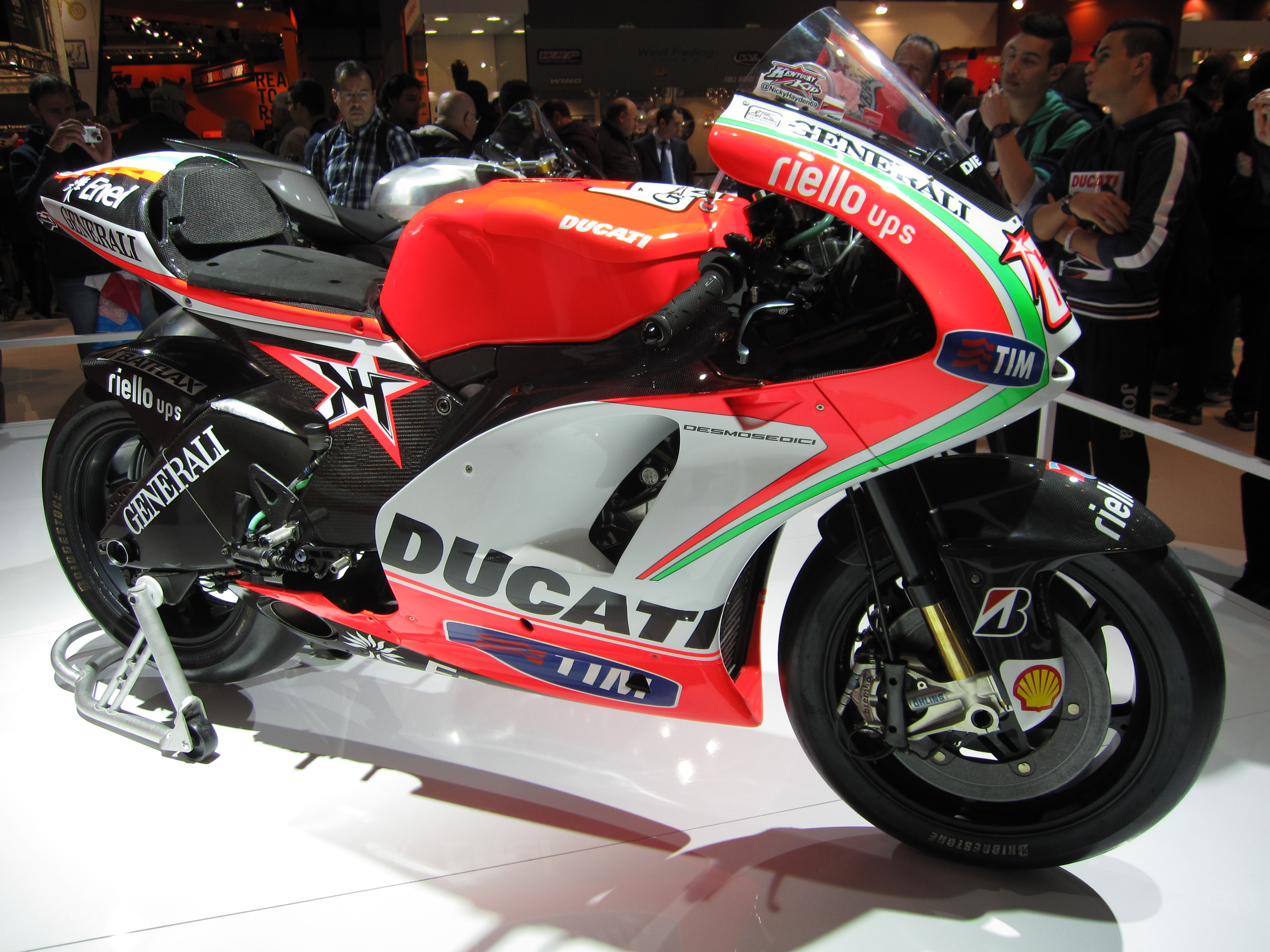
Nicky Hayden's Ducati Desmosedici GP12

On March 19, 2012, Ducati unveiled the GP12 for the 2012 MotoGP World Championship which incorporated new displacement standards of up to 1,000 cc in capacity. The bike was raced by Valentino Rossi and Nicky Hayden.

Ducati Desmosedici GP12 Specifications
Engine
Engine type:	Liquid-cooled, 90-degree, V4 4-stroke with 16-valve, Desmodromic DOHC
Displacement:	1,000 cc
Bore x stroke	81mm x 48.4mm
Ignition:	Magneti Marelli
Carburation	Indirect Magneti Marelli electronic injection, four throttle bodies with injectors above butterfly valves. Throttles operated by EVO TCF (Throttle control & Feedback) system
Maximum power:	>230 hp (2012) >250 hp (2022)
Maximum speed:	
Exhaust	Termignoni
Transmission
Type:	Ducati Seamless Transmission (DST); 6-speed cassette-type gearbox, with alternative gear ratios available
Primary drive:	Gear
Clutch:	Dry multi-plate slipper clutch
Final drive:	D.I.D. Chain
Chassis and running gear
Frame type:	Aluminum chassis
Front suspension:	Öhlins inverted 48 mm front forks
Rear suspension:	Öhlins rear shock absorber, adjuster for pre-load, compression and rebound damping
Front/rear wheels:	Marchesini Magnesium 16.5 inch front and rear
Front/rear tyres:	Bridgestone
Front brake:	Brembo, two 320 mm carbon front discs with four-piston calipers
Rear Brake:	Brembo, single stainless steel rear disc with two-piston calipers
Dry Weight:	157 kg (346 lb.)
Fuel Capacity:	21 L (4.6 imp gal; 5.5 US gal)

=== GP16 ===
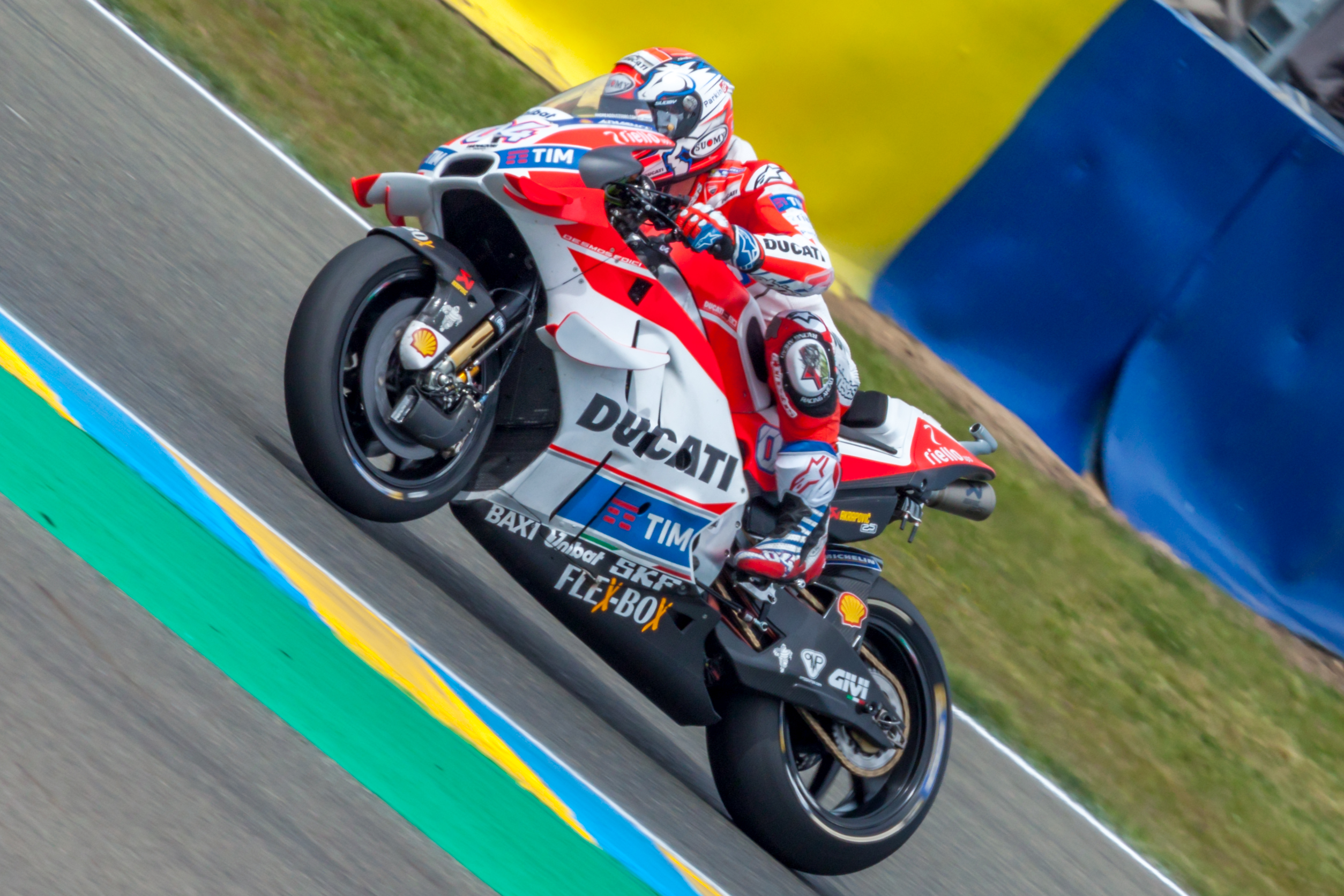
Andrea Dovizioso's Ducati Desmosedici GP16

The Desmosedici GP16 was unveiled in February 2016. It ran the first two pre-season tests with race riders Andrea Dovizioso and Andrea Iannone without a livery. Ducati's MotoGP boss Gigi Dall'Igna describes the 2016 Desmosedici as an "evolution" of its recent challengers. The GP16 was still the fastest bike in a straight line with its extra power. The winglets remained from the previous year, albeit now coloured to match the predominantly white and red Desmosedici.

In the 10th round of the season in Austria, Ducati dominated all sessions. Andrea Iannone and Andrea Dovizioso qualified 1st and 3rd respectively. In the race, Ducati used their lack of wheelies and extra power to stretch out a gap to Jorge Lorenzo after some laps. The two bikes stayed together, with Dovizioso in first for most of the race. But Iannone out-braked him and took the lead into the penultimate corner of the last lap. The win was the first for Iannone in MotoGP and his first since Moto2 Italy 2012. The win was the first for Ducati (and any other manufacturer than Honda or Yamaha) since Casey Stoner won for the team in 2010 Australian Grand Prix. Dovizioso finished in 2nd place to mark the first Ducati 1–2 finish since the 2007 Australian Grand Prix.

In the 17th round of the season at the newly resurfaced Sepang International Circuit in Malaysia, Dovizioso took his second pole of the year in wet conditions. At the start, he fell back to 4th while Iannone, who had qualified in 6th place, led briefly before falling to 2nd place. He stayed there till he crashed at Turn 9. That left Valentino Rossi with Dovizioso at the front and Jorge Lorenzo in a distant 3rd place. Rossi ran wide at turn 1 some laps later and fell back by around 1+ seconds per lap. 'DesmoDovi' held on for his first win with Ducati and his first win since his victory at Donington Park with the Repsol Honda Team in 2009.

== Desmosedici RR ==
The Desmosedici RR is a road-legal version of the Desmosedici, first delivered in early 2008.

== Complete MotoGP results ==
=== Motorcycle summary ===
These results are accurate up to the 2026 Qatar Grand Prix.

==== World Championship titles ====
===== Riders =====
Rider	Nationality	Years
Casey Stoner	Australia	2007
Francesco Bagnaia	Italy	2022, 2023
Jorge Martín	Spain	2024
Marc Márquez	Spain	2025

===== Constructors =====
Constructor	Years
Ducati	2007, 2020, 2021, 2022, 2023, 2024, 2025

===== Teams =====
Team name	Year	Notes
Ducati Marlboro Team	2007	Factory team
Ducati Lenovo Team	2021, 2022, 2024, 2025	Factory team
Prima Pramac Racing	2023	Independent team

===== Race wins =====
Season	Rider 1	Number of races won	Rider 2	Number of races won	Rider 3	Number of races won	Rider 4	Number of races won	Rider 5	Number of races won	Rider 6	Number of races won	Total races won of the season
2003	(Italy) Capirossi	1	N/A										1
2005	(Italy) Capirossi	2	N/A										2
2006	(Italy) Capirossi	3	(Australia) Bayliss	1	N/A								4
2007	(Australia) Stoner	10	(Italy) Capirossi	1	N/A								11
2008	(Australia) Stoner	6	N/A										6
2009	(Australia) Stoner	4	N/A										4
2010	(Australia) Stoner	3	N/A										3
2016	(Italy) Iannone	1	(Italy) Dovizioso	1	N/A								2
2017	(Italy) Dovizioso	6	N/A										6
2018	(Italy) Dovizioso	4	(Spain) Lorenzo	3	N/A								7
2019	(Italy) Dovizioso	2	(Italy) Petrucci	1	N/A								3
2020	(Italy) Dovizioso	1	(Italy) Petrucci	1	N/A								2
2021	(Italy) Bagnaia	4	(Australia) Miller	2	(Spain) Martín	1	N/A						7
2022	(Italy) Bagnaia	7	(Italy) Bastianini	4	(Australia) Miller	1	N/A						12
2023 Races	(Italy) Bagnaia	7	(Spain) Martín	4	(Italy) Bezzecchi	3	(France) Zarco	1	(Italy) Bastianini	1	(Italy) Di Giannantonio	1	17
2023 Sprints	(Spain) Martín	9	(Italy) Bagnaia	4	(Spain) Á. Marquez	2	(Italy) Bezzecchi	1	N/A				16
2024 Races	(Italy) Bagnaia	11	(Spain) Martín	3	(Spain) M. Márquez	3	(Italy) Bastianini	2	N/A				19
2024 Sprints	(Italy) Bagnaia	7	(Spain) Martín	7	(Italy) Bastianini	2	(Spain) M. Márquez	1	N/A				17
2025 Races	(Spain) M. Márquez	11	(Spain) Á. Marquez	3	(Italy) Bagnaia	2	(Spain) F. Aldeguer	1	N/A				17
2025 Sprints	(Spain) M. Márquez	14	(Spain) Á. Marquez	3	(Italy) Bagnaia	2	-		N/A				19
2026 Races	(Spain) M. Márquez	7	(Spain) Á. Marquez	1	(Italy) Di Giannantonio	1	N/A						9
2026 Sprints	(Spain) M. Márquez	10	(Spain) Á. Marquez	1	(Italy) Bagnaia	1	N/A						12

===== Pole statistics =====
Season	Rider 1	Number of poles	Rider 2	Number of poles	Rider 3	Number of poles	Rider 4	Number of poles	Rider 5	Number of poles	Rider 6	Number of poles	Rider 7	Number of poles	Total poles of the season
2003	(Italy) Capirossi	3	N/A												3
2005	(Italy) Capirossi	3	N/A												3
2006	(Italy) Capirossi	2	(Spain) Gibernau	1	N/A										3
2007	(Australia) Stoner	5	N/A												5
2008	(Australia) Stoner	9	N/A												9
2009	(Australia) Stoner	3	N/A												3
2010	(Australia) Stoner	4	N/A												4
2014	(Italy) Dovizioso	1	N/A												1
2015	(Italy) Dovizioso	1	(Italy) Iannone	1	N/A										2
2016	(Italy) Dovizioso	2	(Italy) Iannone	1	N/A										3
2018	(Spain) Lorenzo	4	(Italy) Dovizioso	2	(Australia) Miller	1	N/A								7
2020	(France) Zarco	1	N/A												1
2021	(Italy) Bagnaia	6	(Spain) Martín	4	(France) Zarco	1	N/A								11
2022	(Italy) Bagnaia	5	(Spain) Martín	5	(France) Zarco	2	(Italy) Di Giannantonio	1	(Italy) Bastianini	1	(Australia) Miller	1	(Italy) Bezzecchi	1	16
2023	(Italy) Bagnaia	7	(Spain) Martín	4	(Italy) Bezzecchi	3	(Italy) Marini	2	(Spain) Á. Marquez	1	N/A				17
2024	(Spain) Martín	7	(Italy) Bagnaia	6	(Spain) M. Márquez	2	(Italy) Bastianini	1	N/A						16
2025	(Spain) M. Márquez	8	(Italy) Bagnaia	3	(Spain) Á. Marquez	1	N/A								12
2026	(Spain) M. Márquez	4	(Italy) Di Giannantonio	2	(Italy) Bagnaia	1	(Spain) Á. Marquez	1	N/A						8

=== Ducati Desmosedici results ===
(key) (results in bold indicate pole position; results in italics indicate fastest lap)

Year	Tyres	Motorcycle	Team	No.	Rider	1	2	3	4	5	6	7	8	9	10	11	12	13	14	15	16	17	18	19	20	21	22	Points	RC	Points	TC	Points	MC
2003	M					JPN	RSA	ESP	FRA	ITA	CAT	NED	GBR	GER	CZE	POR	RIO	PAC	MAL	AUS	VAL												
2003	M	Ducati Desmosedici GP3	(Italy) Ducati Marlboro Team	65	(Italy) Loris Capirossi	3	Ret	**Ret**	Ret	2	1	**6**	4	4	Ret	**3**	6	8	6	2	3							177	4th	305	3rd	225	2nd
2003	M	Ducati Desmosedici GP3	(Italy) Ducati Marlboro Team	12	(Australia) Troy Bayliss	5	4	3	Ret	Ret	10	9	5	3	3	6	10	Ret	9	Ret	7							128	6th	305	3rd	225	2nd
2004	M					RSA	ESP	FRA	ITA	CAT	NED	RIO	GER	GBR	CZE	POR	JPN	QAT	MAL	AUS	VAL												
2004	M	Ducati Desmosedici GP3	(Spain) D'Antin MotoGP	11	(Spain) Rubén Xaus	Ret	Ret	14	5	6	7	12	11	11	Ret	Ret	9	3	13	11	Ret							77	11th	115	8th	169	3rd
2004	M	Ducati Desmosedici GP3	(Spain) D'Antin MotoGP	50	(United Kingdom) Neil Hodgson	Ret	Ret	Ret	11	12	10	16	13	10	11	Ret	8	Ret	Ret	18	15							38	17th	115	8th	169	3rd
2004	M	Ducati Desmosedici GP4	(Italy) Ducati Marlboro Team	65	(Italy) Loris Capirossi	6	12	10	8	10	8	4	Ret	7	5	7	Ret	Ret	6	3	9							117	9th	188	5th	169	3rd
2004	M	Ducati Desmosedici GP4	(Italy) Ducati Marlboro Team	12	(Australia) Troy Bayliss	14	Ret	8	4	Ret	Ret	Ret	Ret	5	Ret	8	Ret	Ret	10	9	3							71	14th	188	5th	169	3rd
2005	B					ESP	POR	CHN	FRA	ITA	CAT	NED	USA	GBR	GER	CZE	JPN	MAL	QAT	AUS	TUR	VAL											
2005	B	Ducati Desmosedici GP5	(Italy) Ducati Marlboro Team	65	(Italy) Loris Capirossi	13	9	12	7	3	12	10	10	6	9	2	**1**	**1**	**10**			7						157	6th	295	4th	202	3rd
2005	B	Ducati Desmosedici GP5	(Italy) Ducati Marlboro Team	7	(Spain) Carlos Checa	10	5	Ret	Ret	5	11	9	Ret	5	Ret	8	4	3	6	3	5	4						138	9th	295	4th	202	3rd
2005	B	Ducati Desmosedici GP5	(Italy) Ducati Marlboro Team	23	(Japan) Shinichi Itoh																DSQ							0	NC	295	4th	202	3rd
2005	D	Ducati Desmosedici GP4	(Spain) D'Antin MotoGP - Pramac (Spain) Team d’Antin Pramac	44	(Italy) Roberto Rolfo	15	13	16	15	17	14	18	Ret	10	14	17	Ret	13	12	13	16	Ret						25	18th	25	10th	202	3rd
2006	B					ESP	QAT	TUR	CHN	FRA	ITA	CAT	NED	GBR	GER	USA	CZE	MAL	AUS	JPN	POR	VAL											
2006	B	Ducati Desmosedici GP6	(Italy) Ducati Marlboro Team	65	(Italy) Loris Capirossi	**1**	3	6	8	2	2	DNS	15	9	5	8	1	2	7	**1**	12	2						229	3rd	356	3rd	248	3rd
2006	B	Ducati Desmosedici GP6	(Italy) Ducati Marlboro Team	15	(Spain) Sete Gibernau	Ret	4	11	9	8	**5**	DNS			8	10		5	4	4	Ret							95	13th	356	3rd	248	3rd
2006	B	Ducati Desmosedici GP6	(Italy) Ducati Marlboro Team	66	(Germany) Alex Hofmann								12	13			16											7 (30) (Note: Non-bracketed number refers to the number accumulated with the motorcycle, with number in brackets referring to the total accumulated for the season.)	17th	356	3rd	248	3rd
2006	B	Ducati Desmosedici GP6	(Italy) Ducati Marlboro Team	12	(Australia) Troy Bayliss																	1						25	19th	356	3rd	248	3rd
2006	D	Ducati Desmosedici GP5	(Italy) Pramac d'Antin MotoGP	66	(Germany) Alex Hofmann	15	15	16	15	13	Ret	10			Ret	14		15	13	16	11	Ret						23 (30)	17th	33	11th	248	3rd
2006	D	Ducati Desmosedici GP5	(Italy) Pramac d'Antin MotoGP	30	(Spain) José Luis Cardoso	Ret	16	Ret	17	Ret	17	11	17	15	14	16	Ret	17	17	Ret	14	Ret						10	20th	33	11th	248	3rd
2006	D	Ducati Desmosedici GP5	(Italy) Pramac d'Antin MotoGP	22	(Spain) Iván Silva								16	Ret			18											0	NC	33	11th	248	3rd
2007	B					QAT	ESP	TUR	CHN	FRA	ITA	CAT	GBR	NED	GER	USA	CZE	RSM	POR	JPN	AUS	MAL	VAL										
2007	B	Ducati Desmosedici GP7	(Italy) Pramac d'Antin	4	(Brazil) Alex Barros	9	11	4	14	Ret	3	8	7	7	Ret	9	9	Ret	Ret	8	5	12	7					115	10th	181	6th	394	1st
2007	B	Ducati Desmosedici GP7	(Italy) Pramac d'Antin	66	(Germany) Alex Hofmann	11	DSQ	9	9	5	11	13	9	8	9	WD		11	Ret									65	13th	181	6th	394	1st
2007	B	Ducati Desmosedici GP7	(Italy) Pramac d'Antin	72	(Japan) Shinichi Itoh															15								1	26th	181	6th	394	1st
2007	B	Ducati Desmosedici GP7	(Italy) Pramac d'Antin	57	(United Kingdom) Chaz Davies											16					Ret	17	DNS					0	NC	181	6th	394	1st
2007	B	Ducati Desmosedici GP7	(Italy) Pramac d'Antin	22	(Spain) Iván Silva												16											0	NC	181	6th	394	1st
2007	B	Ducati Desmosedici GP7	(Italy) Ducati Marlboro Team	27	(Australia) **Casey Stoner**	1	5	1	1	3	**4**	1	1	2	**5**	**1**	**1**	**1**	3	6	1	1	2					367	1st	533	1st	394	1st
2007	B	Ducati Desmosedici GP7	(Italy) Ducati Marlboro Team	65	(Italy) Loris Capirossi	Ret	12	3	6	8	7	6	Ret	Ret	2	Ret	6	5	9	1	2	11	5					166	7th	533	1st	394	1st
2008	B					QAT	ESP	POR	CHN	FRA	ITA	CAT	GBR	NED	GER	USA	CZE	RSM	IND	JPN	AUS	MAL	VAL										
2008	B	Ducati Desmosedici GP8	(Italy) Ducati Marlboro Team	1	(Australia) Casey Stoner	1	11	6	3	16	2	**3**	**1**	**1**	**1**	**2**	**Ret**	**Ret**	4	2	**1**	6	**1**					280	2nd	331	3rd	321	2nd
2008	B	Ducati Desmosedici GP8	(Italy) Ducati Marlboro Team	33	(Italy) Marco Melandri	11	12	13	5	15	Ret	11	16	13	Ret	16	7	9	19	13	16	16	16					51	17th	331	3rd	321	2nd
2008	B	Ducati Desmosedici GP8	(Italy) Alice Team	24	(Spain) Toni Elías	14	15	12	8	11	12	DSQ	11	12	12	7	2	3	12	16	11	15	18					92	12th	159	8th	321	2nd
2008	B	Ducati Desmosedici GP8	(Italy) Alice Team	50	(France) Sylvain Guintoli	15	16	14	15	13	11	13	13	10	6	12	12	11	7	14	14	13	12					67	13th	159	8th	321	2nd
2009	B					QAT	JPN	ESP	FRA	ITA	CAT	NED	USA	GER	GBR	CZE	IND	RSM	POR	AUS	MAL	VAL											
2009	B	Ducati Desmosedici GP9	(Italy) Ducati Marlboro Team	27	(Australia) Casey Stoner	**1**	4	3	5	1	3	3	4	4	14				2	**1**	1	**DNS**						220	4th	341	3rd	272	3rd
2009	B	Ducati Desmosedici GP9	(Italy) Ducati Marlboro Team	69	(United States) Nicky Hayden	12	Ret	15	12	12	10	8	5	8	15	6	3	Ret	8	15	5	5						104	13th	341	3rd	272	3rd
2009	B	Ducati Desmosedici GP9	(Italy) Ducati Marlboro Team	36	(Finland) Mika Kallio											Ret	8	7										17 (71)	15th	341	3rd	272	3rd
2009	B	Ducati Desmosedici GP9	(Italy) Pramac Racing	36	(Finland) Mika Kallio	8	8	Ret	Ret	13	9	Ret		14	10				Ret	9	10	9						54 (71)	15th	108	8th	272	3rd
2009	B	Ducati Desmosedici GP9	(Italy) Pramac Racing	88	(Italy) Niccolò Canepa	17	14	16	15	9	16	14	12	12	8	12	Ret	13	13	DNS								38	16th	108	8th	272	3rd
2009	B	Ducati Desmosedici GP9	(Italy) Pramac Racing	44	(Spain) Aleix Espargaró												13	11			11	13						16	18th	108	8th	272	3rd
2009	B	Ducati Desmosedici GP9	(Italy) Pramac Racing	84	(Italy) Michel Fabrizio											Ret												0	NC	108	8th	272	3rd
2009	B	Ducati Desmosedici GP9	(Spain) Grupo Francisco Hernando Ducati Team	59	(Spain) Sete Gibernau	13	Ret	11			15	13	Ret															12	19th	12	11th	272	3rd
Year	Tyres	Motorcycle	Team	No.	Rider	1	2	3	4	5	6	7	8	9	10	11	12	13	14	15	16	17	18	19	20	21	22	Points	RC	Points	TC	Points	MC
2010	B					QAT	SPA	FRA	ITA	GBR	NED	CAT	GER	USA	CZE	IND	RSM	ARA	JPN	MAL	AUS	POR	VAL										
2010	B	Ducati Desmosedici GP10	(Italy) Ducati Marlboro Team (Italy) Ducati Team	27	(Australia) Casey Stoner	**Ret**	5	Ret	4	5	3	3	3	2	3	Ret	5	**1**	1	Ret	**1**	Ret	**2**					225	4th	388	3rd	286	3rd
2010	B	Ducati Desmosedici GP10	(Italy) Ducati Marlboro Team (Italy) Ducati Team	69	(United States) Nicky Hayden	4	4	4	Ret	4	7	8	7	5	6	6	Ret	3	12	6	4	5	Ret					163	7th	388	3rd	286	3rd
2010	B	Ducati Desmosedici GP10	(Italy) Pramac Racing Team	41	(Spain) Aleix Espargaró	Ret	15	9	8	10	10	Ret	Ret	Ret	12	9	11	10	14	Ret	8	Ret	11					65	14th	109	8th	286	3rd
2010	B	Ducati Desmosedici GP10	(Italy) Pramac Racing Team	36	(Finland) Mika Kallio	Ret	7	13	Ret	13	11	12	Ret	9	Ret	Ret	Ret	14	15	12	11							43	17th	109	8th	286	3rd
2010	B	Ducati Desmosedici GP10	(Italy) Pramac Racing Team	71	(Spain) Carlos Checa																	Ret	15					1	21st	109	8th	286	3rd
2010	B	Ducati Desmosedici GP10	(Spain) Páginas Amarillas Aspar Racing Team	40	(Spain) Héctor Barberá	12	13	8	12	11	12	10	9	Ret	9	10	9	11	13	11	14	10	8					90	12th	90	9th	286	3rd
2011	B					QAT	SPA	POR	FRA	CAT	GBR	NED	GER	ITA	USA	CZE	IND	RSM	ARA	JPN	AUS	MAL	VAL										
2011	B	Ducati Desmosedici GP11	(Spain) Mapfre Aspar Team MotoGP	8	(Spain) Héctor Barberá	12	6	Ret	9	11	11	12	7	11	9	10	Ret	9	8	Ret		C	11					82	11th	82	7th	180	3rd
2011	B	Ducati Desmosedici GP11	(Spain) Mapfre Aspar Team MotoGP	2	(Australia) Damian Cudlin																DNS							0	NC	82	7th	180	3rd
2011	B	Ducati Desmosedici GP11	(Italy) Pramac Racing Team	14	(France) Randy de Puniet	Ret	Ret	10	Ret	Ret	12	Ret	14	13	DNS	12	8	14	12	10	6	C	Ret					49	16th	92	6th	180	3rd
2011	B	Ducati Desmosedici GP11	(Italy) Pramac Racing Team	65; 58^{1}	(Italy) Loris Capirossi	Ret	11	12	Ret	9	10	DNS			12	13	Ret	Ret	Ret		9	C	9					43	17th	92	6th	180	3rd
2011	B	Ducati Desmosedici GP11	(Italy) Pramac Racing Team	50	(France) Sylvain Guintoli									17														0	NC	92	6th	180	3rd
2011	B	Ducati Desmosedici GP11	(Italy) Pramac Racing Team	2	(Australia) Damian Cudlin															Ret								0	NC	92	6th	180	3rd
2011	B	Ducati Desmosedici GP11	(Czech Republic) Cardion AB Motoracing	17	(Czech Republic) Karel Abraham	13	7	Ret	10	10	7	Ret	12	12	11	Ret	Ret	12	Ret	DNS	10	C	8					64	14th	64	9th	180	3rd
2011	B	Ducati Desmosedici GP11	(Italy) Ducati Team	46	(Italy) Valentino Rossi	7	5	5	3	5	6	4	6	9	6	6	10	7	10	Ret	Ret	C	Ret					139	7th	271	3rd	180	3rd
2011	B	Ducati Desmosedici GP11	(Italy) Ducati Team	69	(United States) Nicky Hayden	9	3	9	7	8	4	5	10	8	7	7	14	Ret	7	7	7	C	Ret					132	8th	271	3rd	180	3rd
2012	B					QAT	SPA	POR	FRA	CAT	GBR	NED	GER	ITA	USA	IND	CZE	RSM	ARA	JPN	MAL	AUS	VAL										
2012	B	Ducati Desmosedici GP12	(Czech Republic) Cardion AB Motoracing	17	(Czech Republic) Karel Abraham	Ret	17	Ret	Ret	12	DNS	WD			10	8	9	Ret	9	11	10	9	7					59	14th	59	9th	192	3rd
2012	B	Ducati Desmosedici GP12	(Czech Republic) Cardion AB Motoracing	2	(Italy) Franco Battaini								16															0	NC	59	9th	192	3rd
2012	B	Ducati Desmosedici GP12	(Italy) Pramac Racing Team	8	(Spain) Héctor Barberá	9	10	10	9	11	10	7	9	9		WD		Ret	12	10	7	12	Ret					83	11th	93	8th	192	3rd
2012	B	Ducati Desmosedici GP12	(Italy) Pramac Racing Team	24	(Spain) Toni Elías										Ret	11	11											10	24th	93	8th	192	3rd
2012	B	Ducati Desmosedici GP12	(Italy) Ducati Team	46	(Italy) Valentino Rossi	10	9	7	2	7	9	13	6	5	Ret	7	7	2	8	7	5	7	10					163	6th	285	4th	192	3rd
2012	B	Ducati Desmosedici GP12	(Italy) Ducati Team	69	(United States) Nicky Hayden	6	8	11	6	9	7	6	10	7	6	DNS		7	Ret	8	4	8	Ret					122	9th	285	4th	192	3rd
2013	B					QAT	AME	SPA	FRA	ITA	CAT	NED	GER	USA	IND	CZE	GBR	RSM	ARA	MAL	AUS	JPN	VAL										
2013	B	Ducati Desmosedici GP13	(Italy) Ducati Team	04	(Italy) Andrea Dovizioso	7	7	8	4	5	7	10	7	9	10	7	Ret	8	8	8	9	10	9					140	8th	266	4th	155	3rd
2013	B	Ducati Desmosedici GP13	(Italy) Ducati Team	69	(United States) Nicky Hayden	8	9	7	5	6	Ret	11	9	8	9	8	8	9	9	Ret	7	9	8					126	9th	266	4th	155	3rd
2013	B	Ducati Desmosedici GP13	(Italy) Ignite Pramac Racing (Italy) Energy T.I. Pramac Racing	29	(Italy) Andrea Iannone	9	10	Ret	11	13	Ret	13	DNS		11	9	11	Ret	10	Ret	8	14	Ret					57	12th	121	8th	155	3rd
2013	B	Ducati Desmosedici GP13	(Italy) Ignite Pramac Racing (Italy) Energy T.I. Pramac Racing	51	(Italy) Michele Pirro				8		10	14	10			12	12	10										36 (56)	13th	121	8th	155	3rd
2013	B	Ducati Desmosedici GP13	(Italy) Ignite Pramac Racing (Italy) Energy T.I. Pramac Racing	68	(Colombia) Yonny Hernández														12	10	13	15	Ret					14 (21)	18th	121	8th	155	3rd
2013	B	Ducati Desmosedici GP13	(Italy) Ignite Pramac Racing (Italy) Energy T.I. Pramac Racing	11	(United States) Ben Spies	10	13			DNS					DNS													9	21st	121	8th	155	3rd
2013	B	Ducati Desmosedici GP13	(Italy) Ignite Pramac Racing (Italy) Energy T.I. Pramac Racing	15	(San Marino) Alex de Angelis									11														5	23rd	121	8th	155	3rd
2013	B	Ducati Desmosedici GP13	(Italy) Ducati Test Team	51	(Italy) Michele Pirro			11		7													10					20 (56)	13th	—N/a		155	3rd
2014	B					QAT	AME	ARG	SPA	FRA	ITA	CAT	NED	GER	IND	CZE	GBR	RSM	ARA	JPN	AUS	MAL	VAL										
2014	B	Ducati Desmosedici GP14	(Italy) Ducati Team	04	(Italy) Andrea Dovizioso	5	3	9	5	8	6	8	2	8	7	6	5	4	Ret	**5**	4	8	4					187	5th	261	3rd	211	3rd
2014	B	Ducati Desmosedici GP14	(Italy) Ducati Team	35	(United Kingdom) Cal Crutchlow	6	Ret		Ret	11	Ret	Ret	9	10	8	Ret	12	9	3	Ret	Ret	Ret	5					74	13th	261	3rd	211	3rd
2014	B	Ducati Desmosedici GP14	(Italy) Ducati Test Team	51	(Italy) Michele Pirro			17	Ret		11	14				12							9					18	19th	—N/a		211	3rd
2014	B	Ducati Desmosedici GP14	(Spain) Avintia Racing	8	(Spain) Héctor Barberá														19	15	5	9	11					24 (26)	18th	24 (35)	10th	211	3rd
2014	B	Ducati Desmosedici GP14	(Italy) Pramac Racing	29	(Italy) Andrea Iannone	10	7	6	Ret	Ret	7	9	6	5	Ret	5	8	5	Ret	6	Ret	DNS	22					102	10th	155	6th	211	3rd
2014	B	Ducati Desmosedici GP13	(Italy) Energy T.I. Pramac Racing	68	(Colombia) Yonny Hernández	12	13	12	14	13	10	11	19	17	Ret	Ret	11	10	15	Ret	11	7	Ret					53	15th	155	6th	211	3rd
2015	B					QAT	AME	ARG	SPA	FRA	ITA	CAT	NED	GER	IND	CZE	GBR	RSM	ARA	JPN	AUS	MAL	VAL										
2015	B	Ducati Desmosedici GP15	(Italy) Ducati Team	29	(Italy) Andrea Iannone	3	5	4	6	5	**2**	4	4	5	5	4	8	7	4	Ret	3	Ret	Ret					188	5th	350	3rd	256	3rd
2015	B	Ducati Desmosedici GP15	(Italy) Ducati Team	04	(Italy) Andrea Dovizioso	**2**	2	2	9	3	Ret	Ret	12	Ret	9	6	3	8	5	5	13	Ret	7					162	7th	350	3rd	256	3rd
2015	B	Ducati Desmosedici GP15	(Italy) Ducati Test Team	51	(Italy) Michele Pirro						8							Ret					12					12	21st	—N/a		256	3rd
2015	B	Ducati Desmosedici GP14	(Spain) Avintia Racing	8	(Spain) Héctor Barberá	15	12	13	14	13	13	16	Ret	13	15	16	13	18	16	9	16	13	16					33	15th	41	9th	256	3rd
2015	B	Ducati Desmosedici GP14	(Spain) Avintia Racing	63	(France) Mike Di Meglio	19	Ret	18	22	Ret	16	14	18	Ret	17	18	14	13	20	15	20	18	Ret					8	24th	41	9th	256	3rd
2015	B	Ducati Desmosedici GP14	(Italy) Pramac Racing (Italy) Octo Pramac Racing	9	(Italy) Danilo Petrucci	12	10	11	12	10	9	9	11	9	10	10	2	6	Ret	Ret	12	6	10					113	10th	169	6th	256	3rd
2015	B	Ducati Desmosedici GP14	(Italy) Pramac Racing (Italy) Octo Pramac Racing	68	(Colombia) Yonny Hernández	10	Ret	Ret	10	8	10	Ret	14	12	12	11	Ret	Ret	10	14	17	12	13					56	14th	169	6th	256	3rd
2016	M					QAT	ARG	AME	SPA	FRA	ITA	CAT	NED	GER	GBR	AUT	CZE	RSM	ARA	MAL	JPN	AUS	VAL										
2016	M	Ducati Desmosedici GP16	(Italy) Ducati Team	04	(Italy) Andrea Dovizioso	2	13	Ret	Ret	Ret	5	7	**Ret**	3	2	Ret	6	6	11	2	4	**1**	7					171	5th	296	3rd	261	3rd
2016	M	Ducati Desmosedici GP16	(Italy) Ducati Team	29	(Italy) Andrea Iannone	Ret	Ret	3	7	Ret	3	Ret	5	5	1	8	Ret					Ret	3					112	9th	296	3rd	261	3rd
2016	M	Ducati Desmosedici GP16	(Italy) Ducati Team	8	(Spain) Héctor Barberá														17	Ret								0 (102)	10th	296	3rd	261	3rd
2016	M	Ducati Desmosedici GP16	(Italy) Ducati Team	51	(Italy) Michele Pirro													7	12									13 (36)	19th	296	3rd	261	3rd
2016	M	Ducati Desmosedici GP16	(Italy) Ducati Test Team	51	(Italy) Michele Pirro						10				12													10 (36)	19th	—N/a		261	3rd
2016	M	Ducati Desmosedici GP15	(Italy) Octo Pramac Yakhnich	9	(Italy) Danilo Petrucci	DNS				7	8	9	Ret	Ret	11	7	9	11	17	8	9	10	12					75	14th	161	6th	261	3rd
2016	M	Ducati Desmosedici GP15	(Italy) Octo Pramac Yakhnich	45	(United Kingdom) Scott Redding	10	Ret	6	19	Ret	Ret	16	3	4	8	15	17	15	19	9	7	15	14					74	15th	161	6th	261	3rd
2016	M	Ducati Desmosedici GP15	(Italy) Octo Pramac Yakhnich	51	(Italy) Michele Pirro		12	8	16																			12 (36)	19th	161	6th	261	3rd
2016	M	Ducati Desmosedici GP14	(Spain) Avintia Racing	8	(Spain) Héctor Barberá	9	5	9	10	8	12	11	6	9	DSQ	5	14	13	13			4	11					102	10th	139	9th	261	3rd
2016	M	Ducati Desmosedici GP14	(Spain) Avintia Racing	51	(Italy) Michele Pirro							15	Ret															1 (36)	19th	139	9th	261	3rd
2016	M	Ducati Desmosedici GP14	(Spain) Avintia Racing	76	(France) Loris Baz	Ret	Ret	15	13	12	Ret			17	13	14	DNS		18	16	Ret	13	18					35	20th	139	9th	261	3rd
2016	M	Ducati Desmosedici GP14	(Spain) Avintia Racing	7	(Australia) Mike Jones															16	15							1	27th	139	9th	261	3rd
2016	M	Ducati Desmosedici GP14	(Spain) Avintia Racing	12	(Spain) Javier Forés													Ret										0	NC	139	9th	261	3rd
2016	M	Ducati Desmosedici GP14	(Spain) Aspar MotoGP Team	50	(Republic of Ireland) Eugene Laverty	12	4	12	9	11	13	13	7	11	18	6	12	14	14	Ret	14	12	16					77	13th	97	10th	261	3rd
2016	M	Ducati Desmosedici GP14	(Spain) Aspar MotoGP Team	68	(Colombia) Yonny Hernández	Ret	Ret	14	15	Ret	16	17	Ret	18	17	11	11	16	16	12	13	Ret	Ret					20	22nd	97	10th	261	3rd
2017	M					QAT	ARG	AME	SPA	FRA	ITA	CAT	NED	GER	CZE	AUT	GBR	RSM	ARA	JPN	AUS	MAL	VAL										
2017	M	Ducati Desmosedici GP17	(Italy) Ducati Team	04	(Italy) Andrea Dovizioso	2	Ret	6	5	4	1	1	5	8	6	1	1	3	7	1	13	1	Ret					261	2nd	398	3rd	310	3rd
2017	M	Ducati Desmosedici GP17	(Italy) Ducati Team	99	(Spain) Jorge Lorenzo	11	Ret	9	3	6	8	4	15	11	15	4	5	Ret	3	6	15	2	Ret					137	7th	398	3rd	310	3rd
2017	M	Ducati Desmosedici GP17	(Italy) Ducati Test Team	51	(Italy) Michele Pirro						9							5					9					25	23rd	—N/a		310	3rd
2017	M	Ducati Desmosedici GP17	(Italy) Octo Pramac Racing	9	(Italy) Danilo Petrucci	Ret	7	8	7	Ret	3	Ret	2	12	7	Ret	Ret	2	20	3	21	6	13					124	8th	188	5th	310	3rd
2017	M	Ducati Desmosedici GP16	(Italy) Octo Pramac Racing	45	(United Kingdom) Scott Redding	7	8	12	11	Ret	12	13	Ret	20	16	12	8	7	14	16	11	13	Ret					64	14th	188	5th	310	3rd
2017	M	Ducati Desmosedici GP16	(Spain) Reale Avintia Racing	8	(Spain) Héctor Barberá	13	13	14	12	Ret	14	9	16	DSQ	20	17	14	Ret	18	14	20	14	15					28	22nd	73	11th	310	3rd
2017	M	Ducati Desmosedici GP15	(Spain) Reale Avintia Racing	15	(France) Loris Baz	12	11	Ret	13	9	18	12	8	19	Ret	9	15	16	21	10	18	Ret	16					45	18th	73	11th	310	3rd
2017	M	Ducati Desmosedici GP15	(Spain) Pull&Bear Aspar Team	17	(Czech Republic) Karel Abraham	14	10	Ret	15	Ret	16	14	7	17	13	14	13	17	Ret	Ret	14	Ret	14					32	20th	107	9th	310	3rd
2017	M	Ducati Desmosedici GP16	(Spain) Pull&Bear Aspar Team	19	(Spain) Álvaro Bautista	Ret	4	15	Ret	Ret	5	7	Ret	6	Ret	8	10	12	8	Ret	17	11	Ret					75	12th	107	9th	310	3rd
2018	M					QAT	ARG	AME	SPA	FRA	ITA	CAT	NED	GER	CZE	AUT	GBR	RSM	ARA	THA	JPN	AUS	MAL	VAL									
2018	M	Ducati Desmosedici GP18	(Italy) Ducati Test Team	51	(Italy) Michele Pirro						DNS							15						4				14	22nd	—N/a		335	2nd
2018	M	Ducati Desmosedici GP18	(Italy) Ducati Team	04	(Italy) Andrea Dovizioso	1	6	5	Ret	Ret	2	Ret	4	7	**1**	3	C	1	2	2	**18**	3	6	1				245	2nd	392	2nd	335	2nd
2018	M	Ducati Desmosedici GP18	(Italy) Ducati Team	99	(Spain) Jorge Lorenzo	Ret	15	11	Ret	6	1	**1**	7	6	2	1	**C**	**18**	**Ret**	DNS	DNS		WD	12				134	9th	392	2nd	335	2nd
2018	M	Ducati Desmosedici GP18	(Italy) Ducati Team	51	(Italy) Michele Pirro																		Ret					0 (14)	22nd	392	2nd	335	2nd
2018	M	Ducati Desmosedici GP18	(Italy) Ducati Team	19	(Spain) Álvaro Bautista																	4						13 (105)	12th	392	2nd	335	2nd
2018	M	Ducati Desmosedici GP17	(Spain) Ángel Nieto Team	19	(Spain) Álvaro Bautista	13	16	15	8	Ret	9	9	9	5	9	10	C	9	Ret	8	5		7	Ret				92 (105)	12th	104	8th	335	2nd
2018	M	Ducati Desmosedici GP17	(Spain) Ángel Nieto Team	17	(Czech Republic) Karel Abraham																	11						12	23rd	104	8th	335	2nd
2018	M	Ducati Desmosedici GP16	(Spain) Ángel Nieto Team	17	(Czech Republic) Karel Abraham	15	20	Ret	18	17	Ret	13	Ret	18	18	21	C	20	15	17	Ret		Ret	14				12	23rd	104	8th	335	2nd
2018	M	Ducati Desmosedici GP16	(Spain) Ángel Nieto Team	7	(Australia) Mike Jones																	18						0	NC	104	8th	335	2nd
2018	M	Ducati Desmosedici GP16	(Spain) Reale Avintia Racing	81	(Spain) Jordi Torres														20	19	17	17	DNS	15				1	28th	37	12th	335	2nd
2018	M	Ducati Desmosedici GP16	(Spain) Reale Avintia Racing	23	(France) Christophe Ponsson													23										0	NC	37	12th	335	2nd
2018	M	Ducati Desmosedici GP16	(Spain) Reale Avintia Racing	10	(Belgium) Xavier Siméon	21	21	20	17	18	17	Ret	Ret	19	20	Ret	C											1	27th	37	12th	335	2nd
2018	M	Ducati Desmosedici GP17	(Spain) Reale Avintia Racing	10	(Belgium) Xavier Siméon													Ret	19	18	16	15	17	DNS				1	27th	37	12th	335	2nd
2018	M	Ducati Desmosedici GP17	(Spain) Reale Avintia Racing	53	(Spain) Tito Rabat	11	7	8	14	Ret	13	Ret	16	13	Ret	11	C											35	19th	37	12th	335	2nd
2018	M	Ducati Desmosedici GP17	(Italy) Alma Pramac Racing	43	(Australia) Jack Miller	10	**4**	9	6	4	Ret	Ret	10	14	12	18	C	18	9	10	Ret	7	8	Ret				91	13th	235	5th	335	2nd
2018	M	Ducati Desmosedici GP18	(Italy) Alma Pramac Racing	9	(Italy) Danilo Petrucci	5	10	12	4	2	7	8	Ret	4	6	5	C	11	7	9	9	12	9	Ret				144	8th	235	5th	335	2nd
2019	M					QAT	ARG	AME	SPA	FRA	ITA	CAT	NED	GER	CZE	AUT	GBR	RSM	ARA	THA	JPN	AUS	MAL	VAL									
2019	M	Ducati Desmosedici GP19	(Italy) Mission Winnow Ducati (Italy) Ducati Team	04	(Italy) Andrea Dovizioso	1	3	4	4	2	3	Ret	4	5	2	1	Ret	6	2	4	3	7	3	4				269	2nd	445	2nd	318	3rd
2019	M	Ducati Desmosedici GP19	(Italy) Mission Winnow Ducati (Italy) Ducati Team	9	(Italy) Danilo Petrucci	6	6	6	5	3	1	3	6	4	8	9	7	10	12	9	9	Ret	9	Ret				176	6th	445	2nd	318	3rd
2019	M	Ducati Desmosedici GP19	(Italy) Ducati Test Team	51	(Italy) Michele Pirro						7							Ret						Ret				9	22nd	—N/a		318	3rd
2019	M	Ducati Desmosedici GP19	(Italy) Alma Pramac Racing (Italy) Pramac Racing	43	(Australia) Jack Miller	Ret	4	3	Ret	4	Ret	5	9	6	3	Ret	8	9	3	14	10	3	8	3				165	8th	219	6th	318	3rd
2019	M	Ducati Desmosedici GP18	(Italy) Alma Pramac Racing (Italy) Pramac Racing	63	(Italy) Francesco Bagnaia	Ret	14	9	Ret	Ret	Ret	Ret	14	17	12	7	11	Ret	16	11	13	4	12	DNS				54	15th	219	6th	318	3rd
2019	M	Ducati Desmosedici GP18	(Spain) Reale Avintia Racing	53	(Spain) Tito Rabat	19	Ret	15	15	Ret	Ret	9	16	11	16	Ret	16	13	15	17	DNS	Ret		11				23	20th	32	11th	318	3rd
2019	M	Ducati Desmosedici GP18	(Spain) Reale Avintia Racing	17	(Czech Republic) Karel Abraham	18	Ret	16	16	DSQ	14	Ret	17	15	19	15	15	17	18	19	18	14	17	14				9	24th	32	11th	318	3rd
Year	Tyres	Motorcycle	Team	No.	Rider	1	2	3	4	5	6	7	8	9	10	11	12	13	14	15	16	17	18	19	20	21	22	Points	RC	Points	TC	Points	MC
2020	M					SPA	ANC	CZE	AUT	STY	RSM	EMI	CAT	FRA	ARA	TER	EUR	VAL	POR														
2020	M	Ducati Desmosedici GP20	(Italy) Ducati Team	04	(Italy) Andrea Dovizioso	3	6	11	1	5	7	8	Ret	4	7	13	8	8	6									135	4th	213	4th	221	1st
2020	M	Ducati Desmosedici GP20	(Italy) Ducati Team	9	(Italy) Danilo Petrucci	9	Ret	12	7	11	16	10	8	1	15	10	10	15	16									78	12th	213	4th	221	1st
2020	M	Ducati Desmosedici GP20	(Italy) Pramac Racing	43	(Australia) Jack Miller	4	Ret	9	3	2	8	Ret	5	Ret	9	Ret	6	2	2									132	7th	183	5th	221	1st
2020	M	Ducati Desmosedici GP20	(Italy) Pramac Racing	63	(Italy) Francesco Bagnaia	7	Ret	DNS			2	Ret	6	13	Ret	Ret	Ret	11	Ret									47	16th	183	5th	221	1st
2020	M	Ducati Desmosedici GP20	(Italy) Pramac Racing	51	(Italy) Michele Pirro				12	20																		4	23rd	183	5th	221	1st
2020	M	Ducati Desmosedici GP19	(Spain) Reale Avintia Racing (Spain) Hublot Reale Avintia (Spain) Esponsorama Racing	5	(France) Johann Zarco	11	9	**3**	Ret	14	15	11	Ret	5	10	5	9	Ret	10									77	13th	87	10th	221	1st
2020	M	Ducati Desmosedici GP19	(Spain) Reale Avintia Racing (Spain) Hublot Reale Avintia (Spain) Esponsorama Racing	53	(Spain) Tito Rabat	14	11	16	16	21	Ret	Ret	15	Ret	20	14	Ret	17	18									10	22nd	87	10th	221	1st
2021	M					QAT	DOH	POR	SPA	FRA	ITA	CAT	GER	NED	STY	AUT	GBR	ARA	RSM	AME	EMI	ALR	VAL										
2021	M	Ducati Desmosedici GP21	(Italy) Ducati Lenovo Team	63	(Italy) Francesco Bagnaia	**3**	6	2	2	4	Ret	7	5	6	11	2	14	**1**	**1**	**3**	**Ret**	**1**	1					252	2nd	433	1st	357	1st
2021	M	Ducati Desmosedici GP21	(Italy) Ducati Lenovo Team	43	(Australia) Jack Miller	9	9	Ret	1	1	6	3	6	Ret	Ret	11	4	5	5	7	Ret	3	3					181	4th	433	1st	357	1st
2021	M	Ducati Desmosedici GP21	(Italy) Ducati Test Team	51	(Italy) Michele Pirro														11		12							9 (12)	23rd	—N/a		357	1st
2021	M	Ducati Desmosedici GP21	(Italy) Pramac Racing	5	(France) Johann Zarco	2	2	Ret	8	2	4	2	**8**	4	6	Ret	11	17	12	Ret	5	5	6					173	5th	288	4th	357	1st
2021	M	Ducati Desmosedici GP21	(Italy) Pramac Racing	89	(Spain) Jorge Martín	15	**3**	DNS				14	12	Ret	**1**	**3**	Ret	9	Ret	5	Ret	7	**2**					111	9th	288	4th	357	1st
2021	M	Ducati Desmosedici GP21	(Italy) Pramac Racing	51	(Italy) Michele Pirro						13																	3 (12)	23rd	288	4th	357	1st
2021	M	Ducati Desmosedici GP21	(Italy) Pramac Racing	53	(Spain) Tito Rabat				18	15																		1	27th	288	4th	357	1st
2021	M	Ducati Desmosedici GP19	(Spain) Esponsorama Racing	23	(Italy) Enea Bastianini	10	11	9	Ret	14	Ret	10	16	15	12	Ret	12	6	3	6	3	9	8					102	11th	143	8th	357	1st
2021	M	Ducati Desmosedici GP19	(Spain) Esponsorama Racing	10	(Italy) Luca Marini	16	18	12	15	12	17	12	15	18	14	5	15	20	19	14	9	12	17					41	19th	143	8th	357	1st
2022	M					QAT	INA	ARG	AME	POR	SPA	FRA	ITA	CAT	GER	NED	GBR	AUT	RSM	ARA	JPN	THA	AUS	MAL	VAL								
2022	M	Ducati Desmosedici GP22	(Italy) Ducati Lenovo Team	63	(Italy) **Francesco Bagnaia**	Ret	15	5	5	8	**1**	**Ret**	1	Ret	**Ret**	**1**	1	1	1	**2**	Ret	3	3	1	9			265	1st	454	1st	448	1st
2022	M	Ducati Desmosedici GP22	(Italy) Ducati Lenovo Team	43	(Australia) Jack Miller	Ret	4	14	3	Ret	5	2	15	14	3	6	3	3	**18**	5	1	2	Ret	6	Ret			189	5th	454	1st	448	1st
2022	M	Ducati Desmosedici GP22	(Italy) Aruba.it Racing	51	(Italy) Michele Pirro								18	16					Ret									0	27th	—N/a		448	1st
2022	M	Ducati Desmosedici GP22	(Italy) Pramac Racing (Italy) Prima Pramac Racing	5	(France) Johann Zarco	8	3	Ret	9	**2**	Ret	5	4	3	2	13	**Ret**	5	Ret	8	11	4	8	9	Ret			166	8th	318	4th	448	1st
2022	M	Ducati Desmosedici GP22	(Italy) Pramac Racing (Italy) Prima Pramac Racing	89	(Spain) Jorge Martín	**Ret**	Ret	2	**8**	Ret	22	Ret	13	2	6	7	5	10	9	6	3	9	**7**	**Ret**	**3**			152	9th	318	4th	448	1st
2022	M	Ducati Desmosedici GP22	(Italy) Mooney VR46 Racing Team	10	(Italy) Luca Marini	13	14	11	17	12	16	9	6	6	5	17	12	4	4	7	6	23	6	Ret	7			120	12th	231	8th	448	1st
2022	M	Ducati Desmosedici GP21	(Italy) Mooney VR46 Racing Team	72	(Italy) Marco Bezzecchi	Ret	20	9	Ret	15	9	12	5	Ret	11	2	10	9	17	10	10	**16**	4	4	11			111	14th	231	8th	448	1st
2022	M	Ducati Desmosedici GP21	(Italy) Gresini Racing MotoGP	23	(Italy) Enea Bastianini	1	11	10	1	Ret	8	1	Ret	Ret	10	11	4	**Ret**	2	1	9	6	5	2	8			219	3rd	243	7th	448	1st
2022	M	Ducati Desmosedici GP21	(Italy) Gresini Racing MotoGP	49	(Italy) Fabio Di Giannantonio	17	18	Ret	21	Ret	18	13	**11**	Ret	8	14	22	11	20	19	17	18	20	Ret	15			24	20th	243	7th	448	1st
2023	M					POR	ARG	AME	SPA	FRA	ITA	GER	NED	GBR	AUT	CAT	RSM	IND	JPN	INA	AUS	THA	MAL	QAT	VAL								
2023	M	Ducati Desmosedici GP23	(Italy) Ducati Lenovo Team	1	(Italy) **Francesco Bagnaia**	1^{1}	16^{6}	**Ret**^{1}	1^{2}	**Ret**^{3}	**1**^{1}	**2**^{2}	1^{2}	2	**1**^{1}	**DNS**^{2}	3^{3}	Ret^{2}	2^{3}	1^{8}	2	2^{7}	**3**^{3}	2^{5}	1^{5}			467	1st	561	2nd	700	1st
2023	M	Ducati Desmosedici GP23	(Italy) Ducati Lenovo Team	23	(Italy) Enea Bastianini	DNS			DNS		9^{9}	8	Ret^{8}	Ret	10	DNS^{9}				8^{7}	10	13	1^{4}	8	Ret			84	15th	561	2nd	700	1st
2023	M	Ducati Desmosedici GP23	(Italy) Ducati Lenovo Team	9	(Italy) Danilo Petrucci					11																		5	28th	561	2nd	700	1st
2023	M	Ducati Desmosedici GP23	(Italy) Ducati Lenovo Team	51	(Italy) Michele Pirro			11										16	16									5 (5)	27th	561	2nd	700	1st
2023	M	Ducati Desmosedici GP23	(Italy) Aruba.it Racing	51	(Italy) Michele Pirro						16						Ret											0 (5)	27th	—N/a		700	1st
2023	M	Ducati Desmosedici GP23	(Italy) Aruba.it Racing	19	(Spain) Álvaro Bautista																		17					0	31st	—N/a		700	1st
2023	M	Ducati Desmosedici GP23	(Italy) Prima Pramac Racing	89	(Spain) Jorge Martín	Ret^{2}	5^{8}	Ret^{3}	4^{4}	2^{1}	2^{3}	1^{1}	5^{6}	6^{6}	7^{3}	3^{5}	**1**^{1}	2^{1}	**1**^{1}	Ret^{1}	**5**	**1**^{1}	4^{2}	10^{1}	Ret^{1}			428	2nd	653	1st	700	1st
2023	M	Ducati Desmosedici GP23	(Italy) Prima Pramac Racing	5	(France) Johann Zarco	4^{8}	2	7	Ret^{8}	3^{6}	3^{4}	3^{5}	Ret	9^{4}	13	4^{7}	10	6	NC^{5}	Ret	1	10^{9}	12^{8}	12	2^{9}			225	5th	653	1st	700	1st
2023	M	Ducati Desmosedici GP22	(Italy) Gresini Racing MotoGP	73	(Spain) Álex Márquez	5^{9}	**3**^{5}	Ret	8	Ret	Ret	7^{8}	6^{9}	Ret^{1}	5^{4}	6	11^{9}	DNS		DNS	9	Ret^{8}	2^{1}	6^{4}	6^{8}			177	9th	328	6th	700	1st
2023	M	Ducati Desmosedici GP22	(Italy) Gresini Racing MotoGP	49	(Italy) Fabio Di Giannantonio	Ret	10	9	12	8	14	9	Ret	13	17	10	17	Ret	8^{8}	4^{6}	3	9	9	1^{2}	4^{6}			151	12th	328	6th	700	1st
2023	M	Ducati Desmosedici GP22	(Italy) Mooney VR46 Racing Team	72	(Italy) Marco Bezzecchi	3	1^{2}	6^{6}	Ret^{9}	1^{7}	8^{2}	4^{7}	**2**^{1}	**Ret**^{2}	3	12^{8}	2^{2}	**1**^{5}	4^{6}	5^{3}	6	4^{6}	6^{7}	13	Ret^{7}			329	3rd	530	3rd	700	1st
2023	M	Ducati Desmosedici GP22	(Italy) Mooney VR46 Racing Team	10	(Italy) Luca Marini	Ret	8^{3}	2^{7}	6	Ret^{4}	4^{5}	5^{4}	7	7	4	11	9^{7}	DNS		**Ret**^{2}	12	7^{3}	10^{9}	**3**^{3}	9			201	8th	530	3rd	700	1st
2024	M					QAT	POR	AME	SPA	FRA	CAT	ITA	NED	GER	GBR	AUT	ARA	RSM	EMI	INA	JPN	AUS	THA	MAL	SLD								
2024	M	Ducati Desmosedici GP24	(Italy) Ducati Lenovo Team	1	(Italy) Francesco Bagnaia	1^{4}	Ret^{4}	5^{8}	1	3	1	1^{1}	**1**^{1}	1^{3}	3	1^{1}	Ret^{9}	**2**^{2}	**Ret**^{1}	3^{1}	1^{1}	3^{4}	**1**^{3}	**1**	**1**^{1}			498	2nd	884	1st	722	1st
2024	M	Ducati Desmosedici GP24	(Italy) Ducati Lenovo Team	23	(Italy) Enea Bastianini	5^{6}	**2**^{6}	3^{6}	5	4^{4}	18^{5}	2	3^{4}	4^{4}	1^{1}	3^{4}	5^{7}	3^{4}	1^{3}	Ret^{2}	4^{2}	5^{3}	14^{1}	3^{3}	7^{2}			386	4th	884	1st	722	1st
2024	M	Ducati Desmosedici GP24	(Italy) Prima Pramac Racing	89	(Spain) **Jorge Martín**	**3**^{1}	1^{3}	4^{3}	Ret^{1}	**1**^{1}	2^{4}	**3**	2^{2}	**Ret**^{1}	2^{2}	**2**^{2}	2^{2}	15^{1}	2^{2}	**1**	2^{4}	**2**^{1}	2^{2}	2^{1}	3^{3}			508	1st	681	2nd	722	1st
2024	M	Ducati Desmosedici GP24	(Italy) Prima Pramac Racing	21	(Italy) Franco Morbidelli	18	18	Ret	Ret^{4}	7	Ret	6^{4}	9^{9}	5^{5}	10	8^{6}	6	Ret^{3}	5^{9}	4^{5}	5^{5}	6^{5}	Ret^{6}	14^{6}	8^{6}			173	9th	681	2nd	722	1st
2024	M	Ducati Desmosedici GP23	(Italy) Gresini Racing MotoGP	93	(Spain) Marc Márquez	4^{5}	16^{2}	Ret^{2}	**2**^{6}	2^{2}	3^{2}	4^{2}	10	2^{6}	4	4	**1**^{1}	1^{5}	3^{4}	Ret^{3}	3^{3}	1^{2}	11^{4}	12^{2}	2^{7}			392	3rd	565	3rd	722	1st
2024	M	Ducati Desmosedici GP23	(Italy) Gresini Racing MotoGP	73	(Spain) Álex Márquez	6^{7}	Ret	15	4	10	7	9^{8}	7^{8}	3^{9}	7^{6}	10	Ret^{4}	6	9	Ret	Ret^{7}	15	10^{5}	4^{4}	4^{5}			173	8th	565	3rd	722	1st
2024	M	Ducati Desmosedici GP23	(Italy) Pertamina Enduro VR46 Racing Team	49	(Italy) Fabio Di Giannantonio	7	10	6	7	6^{7}	5^{6}	7^{7}	4^{5}	Ret	5^{9}	DNS	8	9	14	Ret^{9}	8^{6}	4^{7}	4^{8}					165	10th	318	5th	722	1st
2024	M	Ducati Desmosedici GP23	(Italy) Pertamina Enduro VR46 Racing Team	72	(Italy) Marco Bezzecchi	14	6	8	3	Ret	11^{9}	13	Ret	8	8	6^{8}	7	5	4^{8}	5^{4}	7	19	Ret^{7}	9	9^{8}			153	12th	318	5th	722	1st
2024	M	Ducati Desmosedici GP23	(Italy) Pertamina Enduro VR46 Racing Team	29	(Italy) Andrea Iannone																			17				0	27th	318	5th	722	1st
2024	M	Ducati Desmosedici GP23	(Italy) Pertamina Enduro VR46 Racing Team	51	(Italy) Michele Pirro																				20			0	29th	318	5th	722	1st
2025	M					THA	ARG	AME	QAT	SPA	FRA	GBR	ARA	ITA	NED	GER	CZE	AUT	HUN	CAT	RSM	JPN	INA	AUS	MAL	POR	VAL						
2025	M	Ducati Desmosedici GP25	(Italy) Ducati Lenovo Team	93	(Spain) **Marc Márquez**	**1**^{1}	**1**^{1}	**Ret**^{1}	**1**^{1}	12^{1}	2^{1}	3^{2}	**1**^{1}	**1**^{1}	1^{1}	**1**^{1}	1^{1}	1^{1}	**1**^{1}	2^{1}	1	2^{2}	Ret^{6}					545	1st	835	1st	768	1st
2025	M	Ducati Desmosedici GP25	(Italy) Ducati Lenovo Team	63	(Italy) Francesco Bagnaia	3^{3}	4^{3}	1^{3}	2^{8}	3^{3}	16	Ret^{6}	3	4^{3}	3^{5}	3	**4**^{7}	8	9	7	Ret	**1**^{1}	Ret	Ret	**Ret**^{1}	Ret^{8}	Ret	288	5th	835	1st	768	1st
2025	M	Ducati Desmosedici GP25	(Italy) Ducati Lenovo Team	11	(Italy) Nicolò Bulega																					15	15	2	27th	835	1st	768	1st
2025	M	Ducati Desmosedici GP25	(Italy) Ducati Lenovo Team	51	(Italy) Michele Pirro																			18	17			0	29th	835	1st	768	1st
2025	M	Ducati Desmosedici GP25	(Italy) Pertamina Enduro VR46 Racing Team	49	(Italy) Fabio Di Giannantonio	10	5^{5}	3^{4}	16^{6}	5^{6}	8^{7}	9^{3}	9^{6}	3^{5}	6^{4}	Ret^{4}	16	Ret^{8}	15^{2}	Ret^{3}	5^{3}	13	9^{8}	2^{5}	6	8^{5}	3^{3}	262	6th	493	3rd	768	1st
2025	M	Ducati Desmosedici GP24	(Italy) Pertamina Enduro VR46 Racing Team	21	(Italy) Franco Morbidelli	4^{5}	3^{7}	4^{5}	3^{3}	Ret^{4}	15	4	5^{4}	6^{7}	7^{8}	DNS		11	6^{3}	Ret	4^{4}	5^{5}	8^{7}	15	4^{4}	Ret	Ret^{6}	231	7th	493	3rd	768	1st
2025	M	Ducati Desmosedici GP24	(Italy) BK8 Gresini Racing MotoGP	73	(Spain) Álex Márquez	2^{2}	2^{2}	2^{2}	6^{2}	1^{2}	Ret^{2}	5^{1}	2^{2}	2^{2}	Ret^{2}	2^{8}	Ret	10^{2}	14^{8}	**1**	3^{2}	6	3^{4}	4^{6}	1^{2}	2^{1}	6^{1}	467	2nd	681	2nd	768	1st
2025	M	Ducati Desmosedici GP24	(Italy) BK8 Gresini Racing MotoGP	54	(Spain) Fermín Aldeguer	13	16	Ret	5^{4}	Ret^{5}	3^{3}	8	6^{3}	12^{9}	Ret^{7}	5	11	2^{6}	16^{5}	15	6^{6}	10	1^{2}	14	Ret^{7}	4^{6}	5	214	8th	681	2nd	768	1st
2026	M					THA	BRA	USA	SPA	FRA	CAT	ITA	HUN	CZE	NED	GER	GBR	ARA	RSM	AUT	JPN	INA	AUS	MAL	QAT	POR	VAL						
2026	M	Ducati Desmosedici GP26	(Italy) Ducati Lenovo Team	93	(Spain) Marc Márquez	Ret^{2}	4^{1}	5	**Ret**^{1}	DNS		7^{5}	**1**^{1}	1^{3}	7^{6}	**1**^{1}	7^{9}	1^{1}	1^{1}	5^{2}	1^{1}	6^{1}	**C**^{1}	1^{2}	2^{1}			431*	1st*	604*	2nd*	569*	1st*
2026	M	Ducati Desmosedici GP26	(Italy) Ducati Lenovo Team	63	(Italy) Francesco Bagnaia	9^{9}	Ret^{8}	10^{2}	Ret^{2}	**Ret**^{2}	3^{6}	3^{7}	3^{9}	3^{1}	Ret^{7}	6^{7}	Ret	Ret	Ret	7^{6}	8	Ret^{8}	C	13^{6}	DNS			173*	9th*	604*	2nd*	569*	1st*
2026	M	Ducati Desmosedici GP26	(Italy) Ducati Lenovo Team	27	(Spain) Iker Lecuona																							0 (18)*	21st*	604*	2nd*	569*	1st*
2026	M	Ducati Desmosedici GP26	(Italy) BK8 Gresini Racing MotoGP	73	(Spain) Álex Márquez	Ret	6^{7}	7^{4}	1	Ret^{8}	Ret^{1}			DNS	5	Ret^{2}	4^{4}	4^{2}	2^{5}	Ret^{5}	Ret	7^{5}	C^{2}	**3**				197*	8th*	344*	6th*	569*	1st*
2026	M	Ducati Desmosedici GP26	(Italy) BK8 Gresini Racing MotoGP	27	(Spain) Iker Lecuona								7												10^{9}			16 (18)*	21st*	344*	6th*	569*	1st*
2026	M	Ducati Desmosedici GP26	(Italy) BK8 Gresini Racing MotoGP	51	(Italy) Michele Pirro							19																0*	32nd*	344*	6th*	569*	1st*
2026	M	Ducati Desmosedici GP25	(Italy) BK8 Gresini Racing MotoGP	54	(Spain) Fermín Aldeguer		8	11	9	9	2	8^{6}	Ret^{5}	6^{8}	DNS			6^{6}	4^{8}	8^{8}	9	Ret^{7}			12			129*	11th*	344*	6th*	569*	1st*
2026	M	Ducati Desmosedici GP25	(Italy) BK8 Gresini Racing MotoGP	27	(Spain) Iker Lecuona												Ret						C^{9}	15				2 (18)*	21st*	344*	6th*	569*	1st*
2026	M	Ducati Desmosedici GP25	(Italy) BK8 Gresini Racing MotoGP	51	(Italy) Michele Pirro	19																						0*	32nd*	344*	6th*	569*	1st*
2026	M	Ducati Desmosedici GP26	(Italy) Pertamina Enduro VR46 Racing Team	49	(Italy) Fabio Di Giannantonio	6^{8}	**3**^{2}	**4**	3^{5}	4	1^{3}	5^{3}	12	4^{4}	4^{3}	Ret^{3}	6^{5}	7	7^{4}	9	18	8^{3}	C^{3}	8^{5}	8^{2}			282*	6th*	352*	5th*	569*	1st*
2026	M	Ducati Desmosedici GP25	(Italy) Pertamina Enduro VR46 Racing Team	21	(Italy) Franco Morbidelli	8	12	14	12^{3}	14	10^{7}	14	14	13	Ret	13	11^{8}	Ret	13	18	15	14	C	10	11			70*	16th*	352*	5th*	569*	1st*

* Season still in progress.

Notes

^{1} Being his final MotoGP race, Capirossi switched numbers for Valencia as a memorial to his fallen countryman Marco Simoncelli, killed at Sepang, by racing with No. 58 that Simoncelli used, instead of his normal No. 65. He was still shown as No. 65 in official timing documentation.

== See also ==
- KTM RC16
- Aprilia RS-GP
- Honda RC213V
- Suzuki GSX-RR
- Yamaha YZR-M1
