= AGV Sports Group =

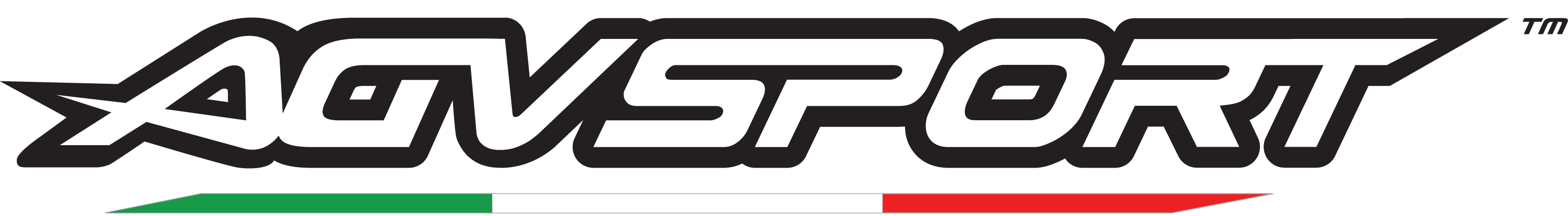
- Company type: Private
- Industry: Motorsport apparel Extreme sports apparel Casual apparel
- Founded: 1985; 41 years ago
- Founder: Michael Parrotte
- Headquarters: Frederick, Maryland, United States
- Website: www.agvsport.com

AGV Sports Group, Inc., based in Frederick, Maryland, designs and develops safety apparel for motorcycle road racing and sport use as well as snowmobile and bicycling apparel.

== History ==
In 1947 Gino Amisano created AGV SpA. (Amisano Gino Valenza), a helmet manufacturer in Italy. In 1977 Michael Parrotte formed AGV USA after being granted the exclusive rights to distribute AGV helmets in the U.S. market by Gino Amisano, the founder of AGV. In 1985 AGV licensed AGV Sport to design and produce apparel and other products, excluding helmets, bearing the AGV name and trademark. The unique model of licensing the brand in different countries was the direct result of the original licensing agreement between AGV SpA and AGV Sports Group. By the early 1990s the AGVSPORT logo had replaced the AGV logo on most apparel for aesthetics reasons due to the different graphic requirements of apparel from helmets. From 1992 until 1995 AGV SpA in Italy owned a 51% stake in AGV Sports Group, Inc.

From 1985 to 1999, AGV Sports Group and AGV Helmets US office operated with the same management, offices, and warehouses. In 2001, the AGVSPORT brand name became a fully independent brand belonging to AGV Sports Group, Inc., a privately held US corporation.

The AGVSPORT brand is distributed internationally through exclusive licensing contracts with current agreements with companies in Canada, Russia, Ukraine, Spain, Italy, Malaysia, Korea, Mexico, India, Australia, Thailand, Brazil, Argentina, Panama and Chile.

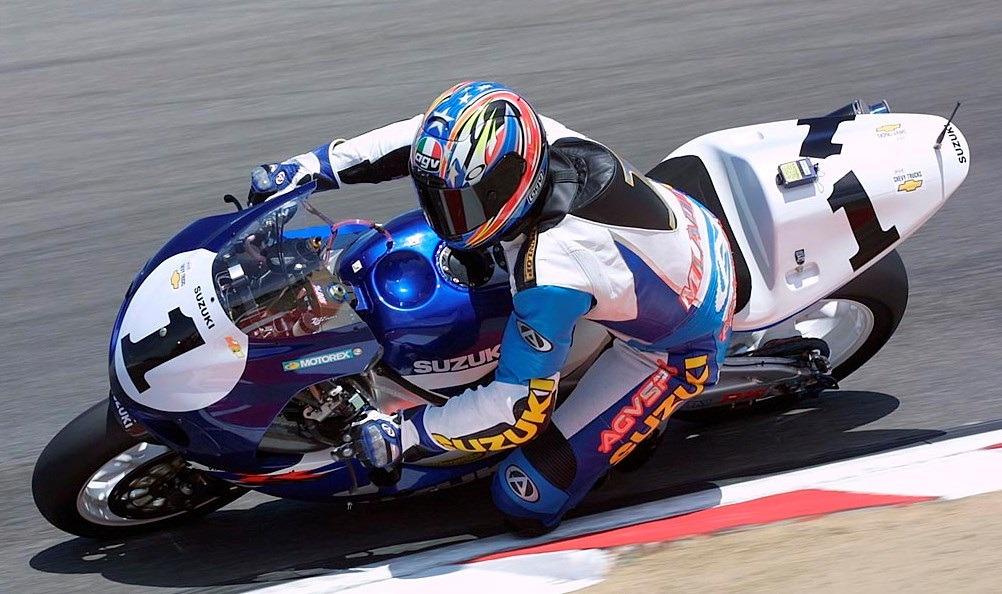
Mat Mladin - Seven time AMA Superbike champion

== Sponsorship ==
AGVSPORT has been the official leather manufacturer of Keith Code's California Superbike School since 1989. For more than 25 years the school have relied on the AGVSPORT suits to protect the hundreds of riders who pass through their school each season.

== AGV Sports Group sponsored racers ==
AGV Sports Group has sponsored riders including road racers

- (Australia) Troy Bayliss
- (United States) Randy Mamola
- (Italy) Loris Capirossi
- (United States) Kurtis Roberts
- (United States) Ben Bostrom
- (United States) Eric Bostrom
- (United States) Roland Sands
- (Canada) Miguel Duhamel
- (Australia) Mat Mladin.
