= Asia Cross Country Rally =

Annual FIA-certified cross-country rally held in Southeast Asia

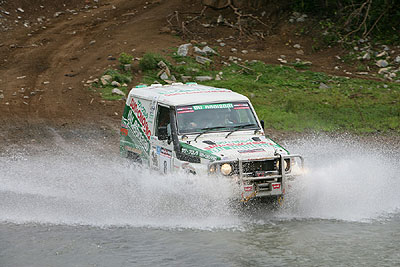
AXCR 2008 tests the endurance as well as the toughness of the 4WD Vehicle

The Asia Cross Country Rally (also known as AXCR), is an FIA certified Cross-country rally competition held annually in Southeast Asia since 1996.

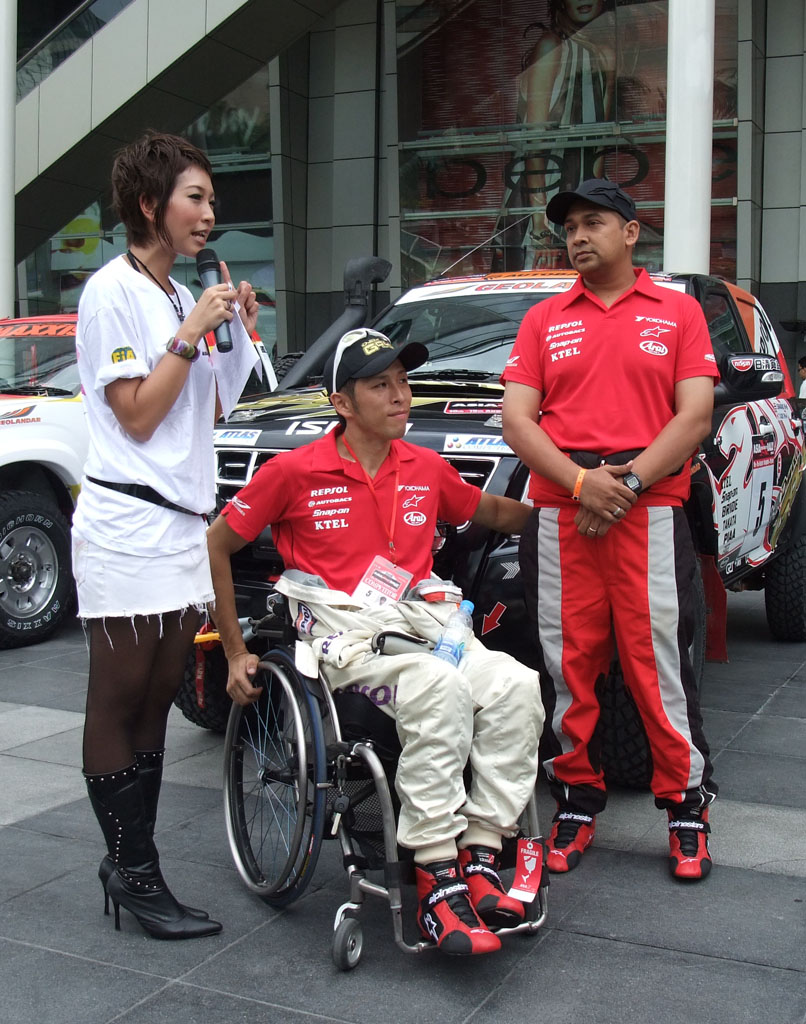
Takuma Aoki, one of the participants of AXCR 2008

This annual rally is organized by R1 Asia, a group of companies formerly known as ORTEV International.

The Asia Cross Country Rally route is designed to cover diverse terrains such as jungles, swamps, river-crossings, and even deserts. Over the years, it has included almost every kind of challenge that nature has to offer in this part of the world.

Designed as a test of driving, navigation, endurance, and teamwork, as well as the durability of 4-wheel drive vehicles, the Asia Cross Country Rally has gained a strong following among 4-wheel enthusiasts throughout many parts of Asia.

Each year, the Asia Cross Country Rally provides participants with a variety of terrain challenges spread over 6 to 9 days, covering 2,000 km to 4,200 km, across diverse terrains. In addition to this, it provides young people the opportunity to meet and make friends with others from different countries in the region.

== History ==
Year	Date	Distance	Routing
1996	Aug 25–31	2,000 km	Malaysia Kuala Lumpur ... Penang ... Kota Bharu ... Kuantan ... Kuala Rompin ... Singapore ... Malaysia Malacca ... Kuala Lumpur
1997	Aug 9–16	3,000 km	Malaysia Kuala Lumpur ... Ipoh ... Kuala Terengganu ... Alor Setar ... Thailand ... Phuket ... Prachuap Khirikhan ... Phetchaburi ... Kanchanaburi ... Bangkok
1998	Aug 8–15	3,200 km	Malaysia Kuala Lumpur ... Cameron Highlands ... Penang ... Thailand ... Surat Thani ... Hua Hin ... Ayutthaya ... Sukhothai ... Mae Hong Son ... Chiang Mai
1999	Aug 7–14	3,500 km	Malaysia Kuala Lumpur ... Bukit Kayu Hitam ... Thailand ... Krabi ... Chumphon ... Kanchanaburi ... Bangkok ... Phetchabun ... Nongkhai ... Laos Viangchan
2000	Aug 5–13	4,200 km	Malaysia Kuala Lumpur ... Sungai Petani ... Thailand ... Surat Thani ... Cha Am ... Ayutthaya ... Phrae ... Chiang Rai ... Myanmar Kyaing Tong ... China Jing Hong
2001	Aug 11–17	3,000 km	Thailand Bangkok ... Pattaya ... Chanthaburi ... Pak Chong ... Khon Kaen ... Sakon Nakon ... Savannakhet ... Vietnam Hue
2002	Aug 3–9	3,000 km	Thailand Bangkok ... Kanchanaburi ... Nakhon Sawan ... Khon Kaen ... Khorat ... Sa Kaeo ... Cambodia Angkor Wat
2003	Aug 8–14	3,000 km	Thailand Bangkok ... Kanchanaburi ... Cha Am ... Chumphon ... Surat Thani ... Hat Yai ... Malaysia Sungai Petani ... Kuala Lumpur
2004	Aug 7–13	2,900 km	Thailand Bangkok ... Phetchabun ... Laos Viangchan ... Thailand Nongkhai ... Khon Kaen ... Pak Chong ... Bangkok
2005	Aug 6–12	3,400 km	Thailand Bangkok ... Ayutthaya ... Mae Sot ... Mae Hong Son ... Chiang Rai ... Sukhothai ... Nakhon Ratchasima ... Pattaya
2006	Aug 6–12	2,513 km	Thailand Bangkok ... Prachinburi ... Aranyaprathet ... Nakhon Ratchasima ... Mukdahan ... Laos Savannakhet ... Pakxe ... Thailand Ubonrachathani
2007	Aug 5–10	2,250 km	Thailand Petchaburi ... Kanchanaburi ... Ayutthaya ... Petchabun ... Nakhon Ratchasima ... Chon Buri
2008	Aug 10–15	2,200 km	Thailand Bangkok ... Kanchanaburi ... Hua Hin ... Chumphon ... Surat Thani ... Trang ... Phuket

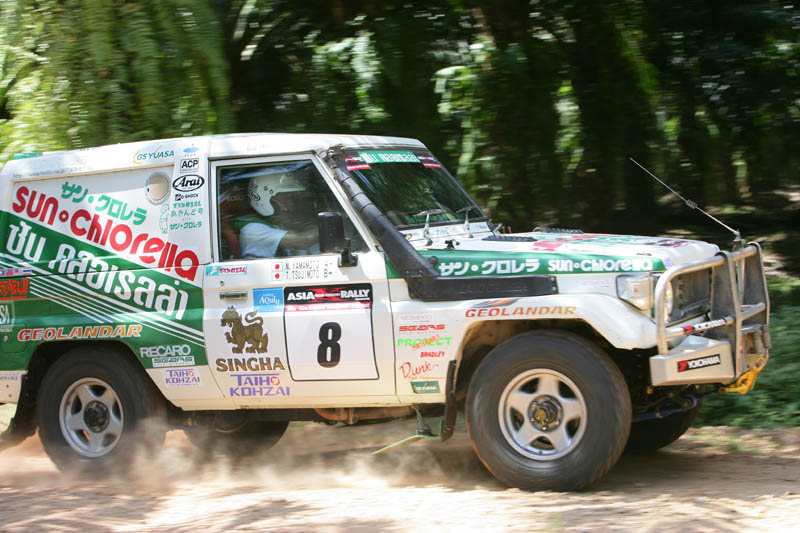
Norihiro Yamamoto, a long time participant of AXCR. This car has endured more than 11 years of AXCR!

== 2008 results ==
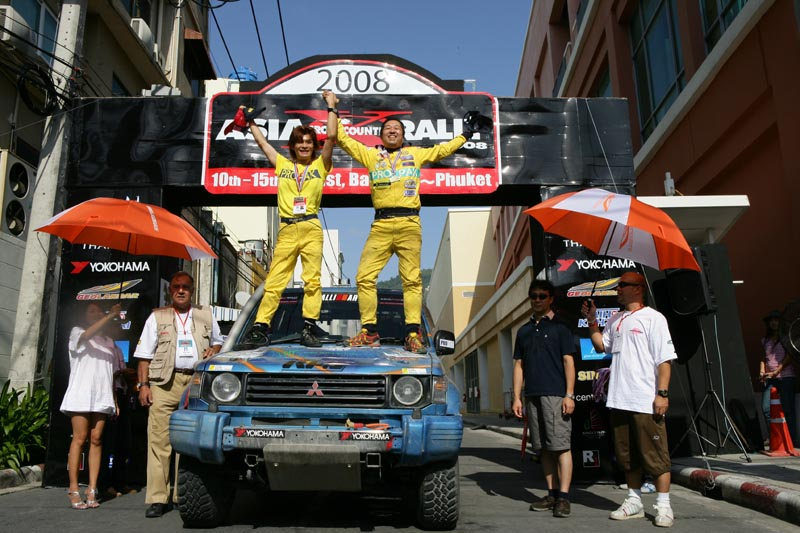
Winner of the AXCR 2008

#	Driver		Co-Driver		Car Make & Model	Team	Total Time
1	Noppadol SUDKAEO	(Thailand)	Thathchai MEENIL	(Thailand)	ISUZU D-MAX	Isuzu N Motor Sport	12:56:30
2	Chamnarn ONSRI	(Thailand)	Chonlanat POPIPAT/Sakon KLARHARN	(Thailand)	MITSUBISHI TRITON	Hankook Motorsports Team	13:04:02
3	Nattapon ANGRITTHANON	(Thailand)	Jumpol DOUNGTIP	(Thailand)	TOYOTA VIGO	Toyota Vigo Cross Country Team Thailand	13:24:58
4	Rachan TRAIRAT	(Thailand)	Pornthep SUKAHUTA	(Thailand)	MITSUBISHI TRITON	Hankook Motorsports Team	13:49:30
5	Vichai WATTANAVISUTH	(Thailand)	Bhisanu PHUSITANONTAKUL	(Thailand)	ISUZU D-MAX	Isuzu N Motor Sport	14:00:01
6	Puttiwat ANGKANAWIN	(Thailand)	Ukrit KHUNTHONG	(Thailand)	TOYOTA VIGO	Goodyear Racing Team Thailand	14:04:09
7	Chai PALAWAT	(Thailand)	Amnuay KOSITAPORN	(Thailand)	MITSUBISHI TRITON	Hankook Motorsports Team	14:07:58
8	Worawat YINGSAKUL	(Thailand)	Athikij SRIMONGKOL/Kitisak KLINCHAN	(Thailand)	TOYOTA VIGO	VRV Bangchak Coca-Cola Banrie Maxxis Team Thailand	14:12:08
9	Vivat AEOLEK	(Thailand)	Chaisin NARKBAN	(Thailand)	ISUZU D-MAX	Isuzu N Motor Sport	14:18:27
10	Thawee NAENNA	(Thailand)	Peerapong SOMBATWONG	(Thailand)	TOYOTA VIGO	VRV Bangchak Coca-Cola Banrie Maxxis Team Thailand	14:18:51
11	Attakorn TANAWONGKUL	(Thailand)	Bunpot AMPORNMAHA	(Thailand)	TOYOTA VIGO	Goodyear Racing Team Thailand	14:30:44
12	Krisda U-YASATIEN	(Thailand)	Amornvit KUAN-U	(Thailand)	MITSUBISHI STRADA	Hankook Motorsports Team	15:11:10
13	Vorapoj BUNCHUAYLUEA	(Thailand)	Chupong CHAIWAN	(Thailand)	TOYOTA VIGO	BRIDGESTONE PURE THAI N BRAKE	21:47:57
14	Parithas THASNASARIT	(Thailand)	Jatuporn BURAKIJPACHAI	(Thailand)	MITSUBISHI TRITON	Hankook Motorsports Team	22:17:30
15	Chusak TASANAWIRIYAKUL	(Thailand)	Somkiat NOICHARD	(Thailand)	TOYOTA VIGO	Toyota Vigo Cross Country Team Thailand	22:25:24
16	Michihiro ASAI	(Japan)	Hideki SASAKI	(Japan)	MITSUBISHI PAJERO	MICHIHIRO ASAI	22:31:30
17	Norihiro YAMAMOTO	(Japan)	Takashi TSUJIMOTO	(Japan)	TOYOTA LAND CRUISER	NORIHIRO YAMAMOTO	22:46:32
18	Tan Chin LONG	(Malaysia)	Ng Hao HAN	(Malaysia)	MITSUBISHI PAJERO	TAN CHIN LONG	23:31:54
19	Takuma AOKI	(Japan)	Ittipon SIMARAKS	(Thailand)	ISUZU D-MAX	Club Super Special Stage	30:03:38
20	Takeshi TSUKADA	(Japan)	Takashi YAMAMOTO/Nobuaki IJIRI	(Japan)	MITSUBISHI PAJERO	TAKESHI TSUKADA	30:36:06
21	Chung Min CHAO	(China)	Deng Min HUA	(China)	ISUZU RODEO	CHUNG MIN CHAO	34:38:07
22	Takashi SASAKI	(Japan)	Kyohei SATO	(Japan)	ISUZU D-MAX	Club Super Special Stage	36:13:57
23	Bundit PANTHITA	(Thailand)	Thanawat BANLUKIT	(Thailand)	SUZUKI VITARA	Hankook Motorsports Team	39:06:09
24	Tadamitsu NIIHORI	(Japan)	Pisit TONGBOONTERM	(Thailand)	TOYOTA VIGO	Toyota Vigo Cross Country Team Thailand	DNF*
25	Kinya MORIKAWA	(Japan)	Masayuki FUKANO	(Japan)	TOYOTA LAND CRUISER	KINYA MORIKAWA	DNF*
26	Niphon NIMYEESOON	(Thailand)	Pradit KU-AMORNWATTANA	(Thailand)	TOYOTA VIGO	VRV Bangchak Coca-Cola Banrie Maxxis Team Thailand	DNF*
27	Takatsugu AOKI	(Japan)	Chakaphan TAPBAMROONG	(Thailand)	ISUZU D-MAX	Club Super Special Stage	DNF*

* Did Not Finish
